= List of songs recorded by Sissel =

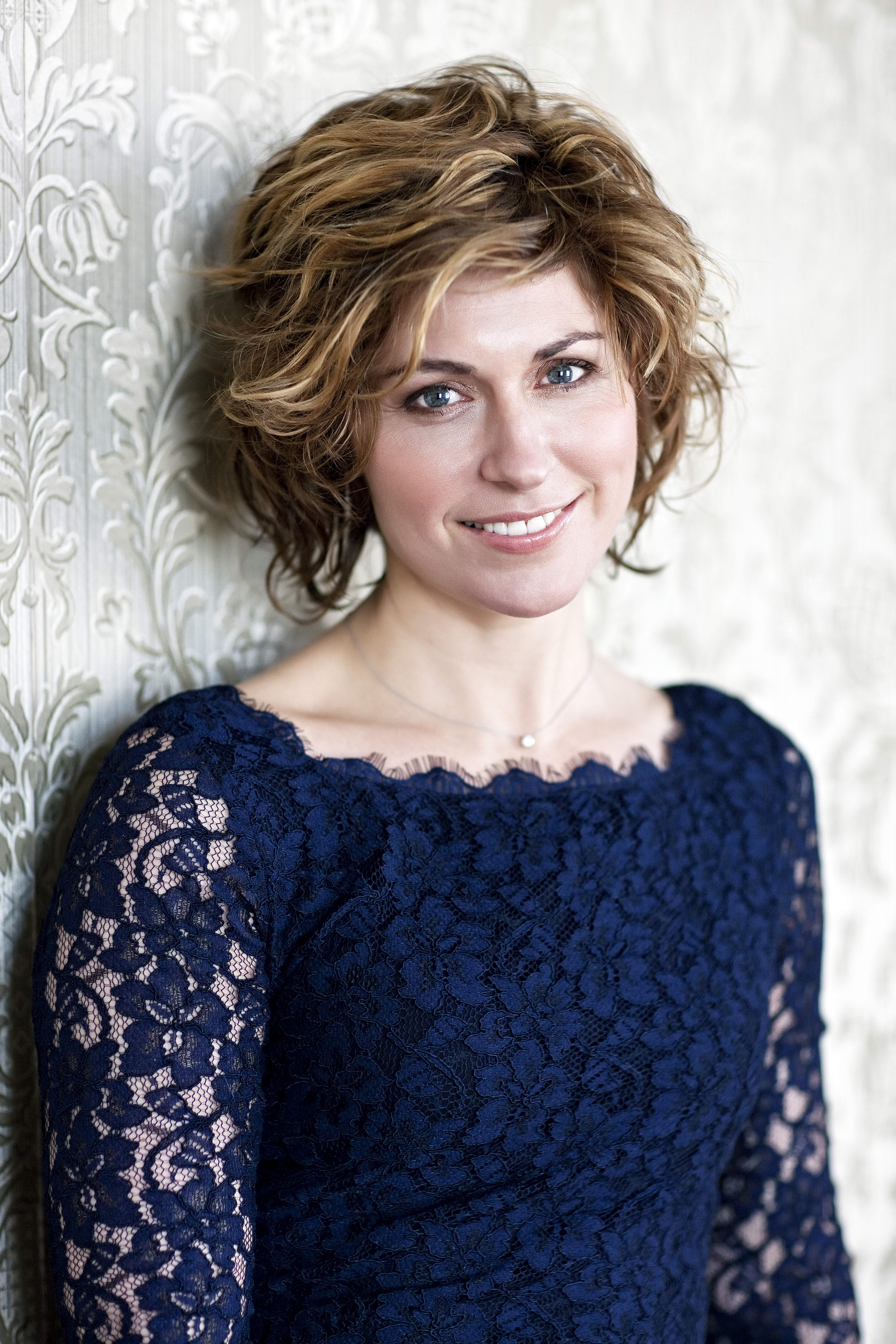

Norwegian recording artist Sissel Kyrkjebø, known internationally as Sissel, has recorded songs for twelve studio albums and has collaborated with other recording artists for vocal duets and featured songs on their respective albums. Sissel is considered one of the world's top crossover sopranos and her combined solo record sales (not including soundtracks and other albums to which she contributed) amount to 10 million albums sold, most of them in Norway, a country with 5 million people. Her albums have also sold well in Scandinavia, the US and Japan. Together with Odd Nordstoga, they are the only Norwegian artists to have an album go 11 times platinum in album sales for Strålande jul (Glorious Christmas) in 2009.

Sissel's musical style runs the gamut from pop recordings and traditional folk songs, to classical vocals and operatic arias. She possesses a "crystalline" voice and wide vocal range, sweeping down from mezzo-soprano notes, in arias such as Mon cœur s'ouvre à ta voix from Saint-Saëns's opera Samson et Dalila, to the F natural above soprano C.

Sissel has sung duets with singers like Plácido Domingo, José Carreras, Andrea Bocelli, Bryn Terfel, Josh Groban, Neil Sedaka, Mario Frangoulis, Russell Watson, Brian May, Tommy Körberg, Diana Krall, Warren G, Charles Aznavour, Dee Dee Bridgewater and The Chieftains. She sings mainly in English and Norwegian, and has also sung songs in Swedish, Danish, Irish, Italian, French, Russian, Icelandic, Faroese, German, Neapolitan, Maori, Japanese, and Latin.

Her participation on the Titanic film soundtracks, singing the Olympic Hymn (Hymne Olympique) at the opening and closing ceremonies of the 1994 Winter Olympics in Lillehammer, Norway, and the tour with the Lord of the Rings Symphony has made her voice familiar to people all over the world. Sissel received her first U.S. Grammy nominations on 6 December 2007 for a collaboration with the Mormon Tabernacle Choir. Spirit of the Season, a collection of songs from the choir's 2006 Christmas concert featuring Sissel and the Orchestra at Temple Square, was nominated for the Best Classical Crossover Album of the Year, as well as Best Engineered Classical Album.

== Released songs by Sissel ==
Key
†	Indicates single release
#	Indicates promotional single release
‡ the	Indicates song co-written by Sissel

Song	Artist(s)	Writer(s)	Album(s)	Year	Ref.
"A Life So Changed"	Sissel Kyrkjebø	James Horner	Titanic	1997	
"A Promise Kept"	Sissel Kyrkjebø	James Horner	Titanic	1997	
"A Time to Love, a Time to Cry"	Sissel Kyrkjebø	Sidney Bechet	Reflections IV	2020	
"An Ocean Of Memories"	Sissel Kyrkjebø	James Horner	Titanic	1997	
"An Raibh Tú Ag An gCarraig (Were You At The Rock?)"	Sissel Kyrkjebø	Dominic Ó Mongain	The Best of Sissel	2000	
"Adagio"	Sissel Kyrkjebø	Tomaso Albinoni	De beste, 1986–2006	2006	
"Adeste Fideles"	Sissel Kyrkjebø; Plácido Domingo; José Carreras	John Francis Wade	Christmas in Moscow	2014	
"After All"	Sissel Kyrkjebø	Bill Maxwell	Reflections II	2019	
"All Good Things" (vers. 1)	Sissel Kyrkjebø	Morten Abel	All Good Things	2000	
"All Good Things" (vers. 2)	Sissel Kyrkjebø	Morten Abel	Sissel	2002	
"Alle hav består av dråper"	Sissel Kyrkjebø; Oslo Gospel Choir	trad. Ragnar Olsen; Svein Gundersen	Soria Moria	1989	
"Alma Redemptoris Mater"	Sissel Kyrkjebø	trad. Per Kolstad	Innerst i sjelen	1994	
"Alt det som skinner"	Sissel Kyrkjebø	Anne Grete Preus		2021	
"Amazing Grace"	Sissel Kyrkjebø	John Newton	Soria Moria	1989	
"Angel Rays"	Sissel Kyrkjebø	Gemma Hayes; Stephen Endelman	My Heart	2004	
"Angels from the Realms of Glory"	Sissel Kyrkjebø; Mormon Tabernacle Choir	James Montgomery	Spirit of the Season	2007	
"Ave Maria"	Sissel Kyrkjebø	trad. Schubert	In Symphony, bonus track	2001	
"Ave Maria"	Sissel Kyrkjebø, Bryn Terfel	trad. Schubert	My Heart	2004	
"Ave Maria"	Sissel Kyrkjebø, Plácido Domingo	trad. Pietro Mascagni	Sacred Songs	2002	
"Ave Verum Corpus"	Sissel Kyrkjebø	trad. Wolfgang Amadeus Mozart	Into Paradise	2006	
"Bachianas Brasileiras" (vers. 1)	Sissel Kyrkjebø; Gli Scapoli	Heitor Villa-Lobos	Everything Must Change	1998	
"Bachianas Brasileiras" (vers. 2)	Sissel Kyrkjebø	Heitor Villa-Lobos	Into Paradise	2006	
"Barndomshjemmet"	Sissel Kyrkjebø	Magnus Brostrup Landstad	De beste, 1986–2006	2006	
"Bereden väg för Herran"	Sissel Kyrkjebø	Frans Michael Franzén trad.	Nordisk Vinternatt	2005	
"Bergensiana (Jeg tok min nystemte)"	Sissel Kyrkjebø	Johan Nordahl Brun	De beste, 1986–2006	2006	
"Better Off Alone" #	Sissel Kyrkjebø	Alf Bretteville-Jensen	All Good Things	2000	
"Beyond Imagination"	Sissel Kyrkjebø	Richard Marx	My Heart	2004	
"Bist du bei mir"	Sissel Kyrkjebø, Plácido Domingo	Johann Sebastian Bach	Sacred Songs	2002	
"Blod i brann"	Sissel Kyrkjebø	Stig Nilsson; Svein Gundersen	Soria Moria	1989	
"Born to Be Loved"	Sissel Kyrkjebø	Lucinda Williams	Reflections II	2019	
"Breakaway"	Sissel Kyrkjebø	Graham Lyle; Benny Gallagher	Gift of Love	1992	
"Breaking Up Is Hard To Do" †	Sissel Kyrkjebø, Neil Sedaka	Neil Sedaka	Gift of Love	1992	
"Bred dina vida vingar"	Sissel Kyrkjebø	Lina Sandell trad. Per Kolstad	Innerst i sjelen	1994	
"Bruremarsj"	Sissel Kyrkjebø	trad.	Nordisk Vinternatt	2005	
"Calling You"	Sissel Kyrkjebø; Oslo Gospel Choir	Bob Telson	Gift of Love	1992	
"Can't Go Back" †	Sissel Kyrkjebø	Alf Bretteville-Jensen	Sissel	2002	
"Carol Of The Bells"	Sissel Kyrkjebø; Plácido Domingo; Charles Aznavour	Peter J. Wilhousky; Mykola Leontovych	Christmas in Vienna III	1995	
"Carrier Of A Secret" (vers. 1) #	Sissel Kyrkjebø	David Forman; Jørn Dahl	All Good Things	2000	
"Carrier Of A Secret" (vers. 2)	Sissel Kyrkjebø	David Forman; Jørn Dahl	Sissel	2002	
"Carrier Of A Secret" (vers. 3) †	Sissel Kyrkjebø	David Forman; Jørn Dahl	CD-Single	2002	
"Christmas Medley" ("It's Christmas Time All Over The World/Auld Lang Syne/ Let It Snow! Let It Snow! Let It Snow!/Let There Be Peace on Earth/We Wish You a Merry Christmas")	Sissel Kyrkjebø; Plácido Domingo; Charles Aznavour	Robert Burns trad. Sammy Cahn; Jule Styne; Jill Jackson Miller; Sy Miller	Christmas in Vienna III	1995	
"Colosso"	Sissel Kyrkjebø	Brian May; Lee Holdridge; Richard Sparks	The Adventures of Pinocchio	1996	
"Crying in the Chapel"	Sissel Kyrkjebø	Artie Glenn	Reflections III	2019	
"Dagane"	Sissel Kyrkjebø	Odd Nordstoga	Til deg	2010	
"Dagen gryr"	Sissel Kyrkjebø	Trygve Henrik Hoff; Svein Gundersen	Sissel	1986	
"Deborah's Theme (From Once Upon A Time In America)"	Sissel Kyrkjebø	Ennio Morricone	My Heart	2004	
"Deilig er jorden" (vers. 2)	Sissel Kyrkjebø	Bernhard Severin Ingemann	Glade Jul	1987	
"Deilig er jorden" (vers. 2)	Sissel Kyrkjebø	Bernhard Severin Ingemann	Julekonserten 10 år	1999	
"Del av din värld"	Sissel Kyrkjebø	Alan Menken	Den lilla sjöjungfrun (The Little Mermaid)	1990	
"Den fagraste rosa"	Sissel Kyrkjebø, Odd Nordstoga	Elias Blix	Strålande jul	2009	
"Den första gång jag såg dig"	Sissel Kyrkjebø	Birger Sjöberg	Nordisk Vinternatt	2005	
"Den första sommaren"	Sissel Kyrkjebø	Per-Erik Moraeus; Py Bäckman	Til deg	2010	
"Den store stjerna"	Sissel Kyrkjebø	Trygve Henrik Hoff; Svein Gundersen	Glade Jul	1987	
"Denti, du Astri"	Sissel Kyrkjebø	trad. Hans Hanson; Gjermund Silset; Kjetil Bjerkestrand	Nordisk Vinternatt	2005	
"Der er ingenting i verden så stille som sne"	Sissel Kyrkjebø	Helge Rode; Thomas Laub; Povl Hamburger	Nordisk Vinternatt	2005	
"Det er min drøm"	Sissel Kyrkjebø	Børje Andersson; Alan Menken	Den lille havfruen (The Little Mermaid)	1990	
"Det er min drøm (Reprise)"	Sissel Kyrkjebø	Børje Andersson; Alan Menken	Den lille havfruen (The Little Mermaid)	1990	
"Det hev ei rose sprunge"	Sissel Kyrkjebø	Peter Hognestad; Friedrich Leiriz trad.	Glade Jul	1987	
"Det lyser en sol"	Sissel Kyrkjebø	Lasse Holm; Trygve Henrik Hoff	Sissel	1986	
"Det lyser i stille grender"	Sissel Kyrkjebø	Jakob Sande; Lars Søraas jr.	Glade Jul	1987	
"Det skall lysa en sol"	Sissel Kyrkjebø	Lasse Holm	Sissel	1987	
"Didn't We"	Sissel Kyrkjebø	Jimmy Webb	Reflections V	2020	
"Dido's Lament"	Sissel Kyrkjebø	Henry Purcell	Into Paradise	2006	
"Don't Let Me Be Lonely Tonight"	Sissel Kyrkjebø	James Taylor	Reflections V	2020	
"Dream A Little Dream Of Me"	Sissel Kyrkjebø	Gus Kahn; Fabian Andre; Wilbur Schwandt	Gift of Love	1992	
"Du är den ende (Forbidden Games)"	Sissel Kyrkjebø	B. Parker; Marc Lanjean	Nordisk Vinternatt	2005	
"Dusk (Velkomne med æra)"	Sissel Kyrkjebø	Geirr Tveitt	Into Paradise	2006	
"Ebb Tide"	Sissel Kyrkjebø	Carl Sigman; Robert Maxwell	Reflections I	2019	
"Eg ser" (vers. 1)	Sissel Kyrkjebø	Bjørn Eidsvåg	Sissel	1986	
"Eg ser" (vers. 2)	Sissel Kyrkjebø	Bjørn Eidsvåg	In Symphony	2001	
"Eg veit i himmerik ei borg" †	Sissel Kyrkjebø	trad. Bernt Støylen	Innerst i sjelen	1994	
"Eg veit i himmerik ei borg (1995-remix)" †	Sissel Kyrkjebø	trad. Bernt Støylen	Deep Within My Soul, bonus track	1995	
"Ei verd som er vår (A World of Our Own)"	Sissel Kyrkjebø, Syng med oss	Tom Springfield; Bjørn Tore André	Syng med oss – 43 Glade Melodier	1986	
"Elia Rising" #	Sissel Kyrkjebø, Sort Sol	Knud Odde Sørensen	Snakecharmer	2001	
"En deilig dag (A Perfect Day)"	Sissel Kyrkjebø	Carrie Jacobs-Bond; Otto Leisner	De beste, 1986–2006	2006	
"En dröm om dej och mej"	Sissel Kyrkjebø	Jon Lind; Richard Page; Py Bäckman	Til deg	2010	
"Es ist ein Ros entsprungen"	Sissel Kyrkjebø	Friedrich Leiriz trad.	Christmas in Moscow	2014	
"Es ist ein Ros entsprungen/Det hev ei rose sprunge"	Sissel Kyrkjebø	Peter Hognestad; Friedrich Leiriz trad.	Christmas in Vienna III	1995	
"Fire In Your Heart" †	Sissel Kyrkjebø; Oslo Gospel Choir	Jan Vincents Johannessen; Svein Gundersen	Innerst i sjelen	1994	
"Fire In Your Heart" †	Sissel, Plácido Domingo; Oslo Gospel Choir	Jan Vincents Johannessen; Svein Gundersen	Innerst i sjelen	1994	
"Folket som danser" †	Sissel Kyrkjebø, Sigvart Dagsland	Erik Hillestad; Sigvart Dagsland	Seculum Seculi	1988	
"Folkestadvisa"	Sissel Kyrkjebø	trad.	Til deg	2010	
"For the Good Times"	Sissel Kyrkjebø	Kris Kristofferson	Reflections I	2019	
"Frostroses"	Sissel Kyrkjebø; Eivør Pálsdóttir; Eleftheria Arvanitaki; Patricia Bardon; Ragga	Karl O. Olgeirsson	The European Divas – Frostroses	2006	
"Frøet (The Rose)"	Sissel Kyrkjebø	Amanda McBroom; Terje Formoe	Sissel	1986	
"Gi meg ikke din styrke"	Sissel Kyrkjebø	Bjørn Eidsvåg	Soria Moria	1989	
"Give Me My Song"	Sissel Kyrkjebø, Bryn Terfel	Benny Andersson	Homeward Bound	2013	
"Glade jul (Silent Night)"	Sissel Kyrkjebø	Joseph Mohr; Franz Xaver Gruber	Glade Jul	1987	
"Go Leave"	Sissel Kyrkjebø	Kate McGarrigle	Reflections I	2019	
"God Bless the Child"	Sissel Kyrkjebø	Billie Holiday; Arthur Herzog Jr.	Reflections V	2020	
"God Rest You Merry, Gentlemen"	Sissel Kyrkjebø	trad.	Northern Lights	2007	
"Going Home"	Sissel Kyrkjebø	William Arms Fisher; Antonín Leopold Dvorák	Northern Lights	2007	
"Goodbye"	Sissel Kyrkjebø	Alyssa Bonagura	Til deg	2010	
"Goodbye"	Sissel Kyrkjebø	Gordon Jenkins	Reflections II	2019	
"Grenseløs"	Sissel Kyrkjebø, Sebastian	Sebastian	Soria Moria	1989	
"Gå inte förbi" †	Sissel Kyrkjebø, Peter Jöback	Ulf Schagerström trad.	Jag kommer hem igen till jul	2003	
"Hallowed Mountains"	Sissel Kyrkjebø	Sissel Kyrkjebø; Kjetil Bjerkestrand	Northern Lights	2007	
"Har en dröm" †	Sissel Kyrkjebø	Trygve Henrik Hoff; Ingela Forsman; Svein Gundersen	Sissel	1987	
"Hark! The Herald Angels Sing" (vers. 1)	Sissel Kyrkjebø	Charles Wesley	Christmas in Vienna III	1995	
"Hark! The Herald Angels Sing" (vers. 2)	Sissel Kyrkjebø	Charles Wesley	Julekonserten	1996	
"Hark! The Herald Angels Sing" (vers. 3)	Sissel Kyrkjebø; The Mormon Tabernacle Choir	Charles Wesley	Spirit of the Season	2007	
"Have I Told You Lately"	Sissel Kyrkjebø	Van Morrison	Reflections I	2019	
"Hela min värld"	Sissel Kyrkjebø	Alan Menken	Den lilla sjöjungfrun (The Little Mermaid)	1990	
"He Ain't Heavy, He's My Brother"	Sissel Kyrkjebø	Bobby Scott; Bob Russell	Reflections V	2020	
"Here, There And Everywhere"	Sissel Kyrkjebø	John Lennon; Paul McCartney	Gift of Love	1992	
"He's A Lot"	Sissel Kyrkjebø	Morten Abel	All Good Things, bonus track	2000	
"Himlen over Himmelbjerget"	Sissel Kyrkjebø	M. Wikke; S. Rasmussen; Stig Kreutzfeldt	Flyvende farmor	2001	
"Hole In The World"	Sissel Kyrkjebø	Bill Luther; Kevin Page; Phil Bamhart	Til deg	2010	
"Hvite roser fra Athen (Weiße Rosen aus Athen)"	Sissel Kyrkjebø, Syng med oss	Manos Hadjidakis; Hans Bradtke; Juul Hansen	Syng med oss – 43 Glade Melodier	1986	
"Hymne (Jesus, din søte forening å smake)"	Sissel Kyrkjebø	J. L. C. Allendorf; Peder Jacobsen Hygom; Elias Blix; Johann B. König	My Heart	2003	
"Hymne Olympique"	Sissel Kyrkjebø	Kostis Palamas; Halldis Moren Vesaas	Innerst i sjelen, bonus track	1994	
"Hymn To The Sea"	Sissel Kyrkjebø	James Horner	Titanic	1997	
"Hymn To Winter"	Sissel Kyrkjebø	trad. Brendan Graham; Kjetil Bjerkestrand	Northern Lights	2007	
"I'll Never Fall in Love Again"	Sissel Kyrkjebø	Burt Bacharach; Hal David	Reflections IV	2020	
"I'm a Fool"	Sissel Kyrkjebø	Frank Sinatra; Jack Wolf; Joel Herron	Reflections I	2019	
"I ditt smil"	Sissel Kyrkjebø	Trygve Henrik Hoff; Svein Gundersen	Sissel	1986	
"I Don't Know How to Love Him"	Sissel Kyrkjebø	Andrew Lloyd Webber; Tim Rice	Reflections IV	2020	
"I Will Wait For You"	Sissel Kyrkjebø	Norman Gimbel; Michel Legrand	Reflections V	2020	
"I Wish I Knew How It Would Feel to Be Free"	Sissel Kyrkjebø	Billy Taylor; Richard Carroll Lamb (Dick Dallas)	Reflections IV	2020	
"Icelandic Lullaby"	Sissel Kyrkjebø	trad. Brendan Graham; Kjetil Bjerkestrand	Northern Lights	2007	
"Ich hatte viel Bekümmernis"	Sissel Kyrkjebø	Johann Sebastian Bach	My Heart	2003	
"I en steingrå vinter (In The Bleak Midwinter)"	Sissel Kyrkjebø	Christina Rossetti; Ole Paus; Gustav Holst	Strålande jul	2009	
"If"	Sissel Kyrkjebø	David Gates	Gift of Love	1992	
"If I Can Dream"	Sissel Kyrkjebø	Walter Earl Brown	Reflections III	2019	
"If I Can Help Somebody"	Sissel Kyrkjebø	Alma Bazel Androzzo	Reflections III	2019	
"If You Go Away"	Sissel Kyrkjebø	Jacques Brel; Rod McKuen	Reflections IV	2020	
"If You Love Me (Hymne à l'amour)"	Sissel Kyrkjebø	Edith Piaf; G. Parsson; Marguerite Monnot	De beste, 1986–2006	2006	
"Ikke la meg gå"	Sissel Kyrkjebø	Trygve Henrik Hoff; Svein Gundersen	Drømmeslottet OST	1986	
"Imagine" †	Sissel Kyrkjebø	John Lennon	CD-Single	1993	
"In dulci jubilo (Jeg synger julekvad)"	Sissel Kyrkjebø; The Mormon Tabernacle Choir	Henrik Suso; Martin Luther; Magnus Brostrup Landstad	Spirit of the Season	2007	
"In the Wee Small Hours of the Morning"	Sissel Kyrkjebø	Bob Hilliard; David Mann	Reflections IV	2020	
"Ingen vinner frem"	Sissel Kyrkjebø	Lars Linderot; Gustav Jensen	Into Paradise	2006	
"Innerst i sjelen" (vers. 1) #	Sissel Kyrkjebø	Örjan Englund; Ole Paus; Lars Børke	Innerst i sjelen	1994	
"Innerst i sjelen" (vers. 2)	Sissel Kyrkjebø	Örjan Englund; Ole Paus; Lars Børke	In Symphony	2001	
"In My Life"	Sissel Kyrkjebø	John Lennon; Paul McCartney	Reflections II	2019	
"In Paradisum"	Sissel Kyrkjebø	trad. Gabriel Fauré	Into Paradise	2006	
"In The Bleak Midwinter"	Sissel Kyrkjebø; The Mormon Tabernacle Choir	Christina Rossetti; Gustav Holst	Spirit of the Season	2007	
"In The Lonely Dark Of Night"	Sissel Kyrkjebø, Eivør Pálsdóttir	Einar Sigurðsson; Friðrik Erlingsson	The European Divas – Frostroses, Sigvaldi Kaldalóns	2006	
"In the Night of New Year’s Eve"	Sissel Kyrkjebø	Py Bäckman; Stefan Nilsson	Reflections III	2019	
"Inn til deg"	Sissel Kyrkjebø	Trygve Henrik Hoff; Lars Muhl	Sissel	1986	
"I skovens dybe stille ro"	Sissel Kyrkjebø	T. Fritz Andersen Elde trad. Per Kolstad	Innerst i sjelen	1994	
"Jag ser"	Sissel Kyrkjebø	Bjørn Eidsvåg	Sissel	1987	
"Jag vill alltid följa dig"	Sissel Kyrkjebø	Py Bäckman; Stefan Nilsson	Strålande jul	2009	
"Jeg er så glad hver julekveld"	Sissel Kyrkjebø; Uranienborg Barnekor	Marie Wexelsen; Peter Knudsen	Glade Jul	1987	
"Jeg lagde meg så silde"	Sissel Kyrkjebø	trad.	Nordisk Vinternatt	2005	
"Jeg trenger deg (You Needed Me)"	Sissel Kyrkjebø	Randy Goodrum; Øyvind Offerdal	Sissel	1986	
"Jesu, Joy of Man's Desiring"	Sissel Kyrkjebø	Martin Janus; Johann Schop; Johann Sebastian Bach	Northern Lights	2007	
"Julen är här"	Sissel Kyrkjebø, Tommy Körberg	B.Butt; Sölve Rydell	Julen är här	1989	
"Jul i svingen"	Sissel Kyrkjebø, Odd Nordstoga	Odd Nordstoga; Kjetil Indregard	Strålande jul	2009	
"Jul, jul, strålande jul"	Sissel Kyrkjebø, Odd Nordstoga	Gustav Nordquist; Edvard Evers	Strålande jul	2009	
"Julepotpurri" ("Et barn er født i Betlehem/Her kommer dine arme små/ Det kimer nå til julefest/Jeg synger julekvad")	Sissel Kyrkjebø	Grundtvig; Brorson; Landstad; Lindemann; Schulz; Balle trad.	Glade Jul	1987	
"June's Song"	Sissel Kyrkjebø	Jacqueline Kroft; Geoffrey Burgon	The Forsyte Saga OST	2002	
"June's Song" (vocalize)	Sissel Kyrkjebø	Geoffrey Burgon	The Forsyte Saga OST	2002	
"Kärleken (Only Love)"	Sissel Kyrkjebø	Trygve Henrik Hoff; Vladimir Cosma	Sissel	1987	
"Keep Falling Down" (vers. 1)	Sissel Kyrkjebø	David Forman; Jørn Dahl	All Good Things	2000	
"Keep Falling Down" (vers. 2)	Sissel Kyrkjebø	David Forman; Jørn Dahl	Sissel	2002	
"Kjærlighet (Only Love)" (vers. 1)	Sissel Kyrkjebø	Rolf Tofte; Vladimir Cosma	Sissel	1986	
"Kjærlighet (Only Love)" (vers. 2)	Sissel Kyrkjebø	Rolf Tofte; Vladimir Cosma	In Symphony	2001	
"Koppången" (vers. 1)	Sissel Kyrkjebø	Py Bäckman; Per-Erik Moraeus	In Symphony	2001	
"Koppången" (vers. 2)	Sissel Kyrkjebø	Py Bäckman; Per-Erik Moraeus	Nordisk Vinternatt	2005	
"Koppången" (vers. 3 : in English)	Sissel Kyrkjebø	Py Bäckman; Per-Erik Moraeus	Northern Lights	2007	
"Kum Ba Yah, My Lord"	Sissel Kyrkjebø; Plácido Domingo; Charles Aznavour	trad.	Christmas in Vienna III	1995	
"Lascia Ch'io Pianga"	Sissel Kyrkjebø	Giacomo Rossi; George Friedrich Händel	My Heart	2004	
"Leise rieselt der Schnee"	Sissel Kyrkjebø	Eduard Ebel	Christmas in Moscow	2014	
"Let It Snow"	Sissel Kyrkjebø	Sammy Cahn; Jule Styne	Reflections III	2019	
"Levande död"	Sissel Kyrkjebø	Hugh Prestwood; Py Bäckman	Til deg	2010	
"Leve med dig"	Sissel Kyrkjebø	Jesper Kjær; Alan Menken	Den lille havfrue (The Little Mermaid)	1990	
"Leve som dem"	Sissel Kyrkjebø	Jesper Kjær; Alan Menken	Den lille havfrue (The Little Mermaid)	1990	
"Like An Angel Passing Through My Room" (vers. 1)	Sissel Kyrkjebø	Benny Andersson; Björn Ulvaeus	Into Paradise	2006	
"Like An Angel Passing Through My Room" (vers. 2)	Sissel Kyrkjebø	Benny Andersson; Björn Ulvaeus	Spirit of the Season	2007	
"Liliana"	Sissel Kyrkjebø	Knut Koppang	Soria Moria	1989	
"Little Drummer Boy"	Sissel Kyrkjebø, José Carreras	Davis; Onorati; Simeone	Christmas in Moscow	2014	
"Lord Protect My Child"	Sissel Kyrkjebø	Bob Dylan	Reflections I	2019	
"Lær meg å kjenne" (vers. 1)	Sissel Kyrkjebø	Jakob Paulli trad.	All Good Things	2000	
"Lær meg å kjenne" (vers. 2)	Sissel Kyrkjebø	Jakob Paulli trad.	Sissel	2002	
"Låt julen förkunna (Happy Xmas (War Is Over))"	Sissel Kyrkjebø, Tommy Körberg	John Lennon; Yoko Ono; Py Bäckman; Dan Hylander	Julen är här	1989	
"Make Me a Present of You"	Sissel Kyrkjebø	Joe Greene	Reflections III	2019	
"Marble Halls"	Sissel Kyrkjebø	Alfred Bunn; Michael W. Balfe	Into Paradise	2006	
"Mariä Wiegenlied"	Sissel Kyrkjebø; The Mormon Tabernacle Choir	Martin Boelitz; Max Reger	Spirit of the Season	2007	
"Mary's Boy Child" (vers. 1)	Sissel Kyrkjebø	Jester Hairston	Glade Jul	1987	
"Mary's Boy Child" (vers. 2)	Sissel Kyrkjebø	Jester Hairston	Julekonserten	1996	
"Mellom himmel og jord"	Sissel Kyrkjebø; Artister for "Vend ryggen til '90"	Stig Nilsson; Svein Gundersen	Vend ryggen til '90	1990	
"Minner (Memory)"	Sissel Kyrkjebø	Trevor Nunn; Andrew Lloyd Webber; Harald Engelstad	Syng med oss	1983	
"Miracle Song"	Sissel Kyrkjebø	Neil Sedaka; Howard Greenfield	Gift of Love	1992	
"Mitt hjerte alltid vanker" (vers. 1) #	Sissel Kyrkjebø	Hans Adolph Brorson trad.	Glade Jul	1987	
"Mitt hjerte alltid vanker" (vers. 2)	Sissel Kyrkjebø, The Chieftains	Hans Adolph Brorson trad.	Silent Night: A Christmas in Rome	1999	
"Mitt hjerte alltid vanker" (vers. 3)	Sissel Kyrkjebø	Hans Adolph Brorson trad.	In Symphony	2001	
"Mitt hjerte alltid vanker" (vers. 4)	Sissel Kyrkjebø	Hans Adolph Brorson trad.	The European Divas – Frostroses	2006	
"Mitt hjerte alltid vanker" (vers. 5)	Sissel Kyrkjebø; The Mormon Tabernacle Choir	Hans Adolph Brorson trad.	Spirit of the Season	2007	
"Molde Canticle" (vers. 1)	Sissel Kyrkjebø	Jan Garbarek	Innerst i sjelen, bonus track	1994	
"Molde Canticle" (vers. 2)	Sissel Kyrkjebø	Jan Garbarek	In Symphony	2001	
"Molde Canticle" (vers. 3)	Sissel Kyrkjebø	Jan Garbarek	Sissel	2002	
"Mon cœur s'ouvre à ta voix"	Sissel Kyrkjebø	Ferdinand Lemaire; Camille Saint-Saëns	My Heart	2004	
"Moonlight"	Sissel Kyrkjebø	Stefan Zauner; Aron Strobel	Gift of Love	1992	
"More Like You"	Sissel Kyrkjebø; Oslo Gospel Choir	Stormie Omartian; Michael Omartian	Gift of Love	1992	
"Mot den nya världen"	Sissel Kyrkjebø	Py Bäckman; Stefan Nilsson	Strålande jul	2009	
"Musens sang"	Sissel Kyrkjebø	Børge Müller; Kai Normann Andersen	Nordisk Vinternatt	2005	
"My Foolish Heart"	Sissel Kyrkjebø	Ned Washington; Victor Young	Reflections I	2019	
"My Romance"	Sissel Kyrkjebø	Lorenz Hart; Richard Rodgers	Reflections IV	2020	
"My Tribute (To God Be The Glory)" (vers. 1)	Sissel Kyrkjebø; Oslo Gospel Choir	Andrae Crouch	Live	1990	
"My Tribute (To God Be The Glory)" (vers. 2)	Sissel Kyrkjebø; Oslo Gospel Choir	Andrae Crouch	The Best of Sissel	2000	
"My Tribute (To God Be The Glory)" (vers. 3)	Sissel Kyrkjebø; Oslo Gospel Choir	Andrae Crouch	De beste, 1986–2006	2006	
"Need I Say More" †	Sissel Kyrkjebø	Lou Pardini; Allan Rich; Victor Cook	Gift of Love	1992	
"Never An Absolution"	Sissel Kyrkjebø	James Horner	Titanic	1997	
"No høyr, de gode folk (Wexford Carol)"	Sissel Kyrkjebø, Odd Nordstoga	Stein Versto trad.	Strålande jul	2009	
"Nu tändas tusen juleljus" (vers. 1)	Sissel Kyrkjebø	Emmy Köhler	Stilla Natt	1987	
"Nu tändas tusen juleljus" (vers. 2) †	Sissel Kyrkjebø	Emmy Köhler	Julekonserten 10 år	1999	
"Nå tennes tusen julelys"	Sissel Kyrkjebø, Brynjar Hoff	Emmy Köhler; Lars Søraas jr.	Glade Jul	1987	
"Når rosene blomstrer i mormors hage"	Sissel Kyrkjebø	Kolbjørn Ofstad	De beste, 1986–2006	2006	
"Når solen går ned (The Homing Waltz)"	Sissel Kyrkjebø, Syng med oss	Tommie Connor; Johnny Reine; Aase Gjødsbøl Krogh	Syng med oss – 43 Glade Melodier	1986	
"Oblivion (One Stolen Kiss)"	Sissel Kyrkjebø	David Zippel; Astor Piazzolla	My Heart	2004	
"O Come All Ye Faithful"	Sissel Kyrkjebø, Ragga	John Francis Wade	The European Divas – Frostroses	2006	
"O Helga Natt (O Holy Night)"	Sissel Kyrkjebø	Adolphe Adam	Glade Jul	1987	
"O Mio Babbino Caro" (vers. 1)	Sissel Kyrkjebø	Giacomo Puccini	In Symphony	2001	
"O Mio Babbino Caro" (vers. 2)	Sissel Kyrkjebø	Giacomo Puccini	My Heart	2004	
"Om kvelden"	Sissel Kyrkjebø	Arnulf Øverland trad.	Nordisk Vinternatt	2005	
"One Day" #	Sissel Kyrkjebø	Sissel Kyrkjebø; Stargate	All Good Things	2000	
"O tysta ensamhet" #	Sissel Kyrkjebø	Olof von Dalin trad. Tord Gustavsen	Nordisk Vinternatt	2005	
"Out of Left Field"	Sissel Kyrkjebø	Dan Penn; Spooner Oldham	Reflections I	2019	
"Peace On Earth" †	Sissel Kyrkjebø; Herrey's; Lili & Susie; Rolf Graf; Dan Tillberg; Esa Kaartamo; Gry Meilstrup	Lars Vesterholt; Ivar L. Greiner	Single	1986	
"Pie Jesu" (Version 1)	Sissel Kyrkjebø; Oslo Gospel Choir	Andrew Lloyd Webber	Live	1990	
"Pie Jesu" (Version 2)	Sissel Kyrkjebø	Andrew Lloyd Webber	My Heart	2004	
"Pokarekare Ana" #	Sissel Kyrkjebø; Oslo Gospel Choir	trad. Stig Nilsson	Soria Moria	1989	
"Prince Igor" †	Sissel Kyrkjebø, Warren G	Warren G Achim Völker; Alexander Borodin	The Rapsody Overture	1997	
"Prosesjon"	Sissel Kyrkjebø, Kåre Kolve	Jan Garbarek	Innerst i sjelen, bonus track	1994	
"Quando Sento Che Mi Ami"	Sissel Kyrkjebø, José Carreras	Albert Hammond; John Bettis; Chiara Ferau	Northern Lights	2007	
"Ready To Go Home"	Sissel Kyrkjebø	Graham Gouldman	Northern Lights	2007	
"River"	Sissel Kyrkjebø	Joni Mitchell	Reflections III	2019	
"Romance (Romance Without Words)"	Sissel Kyrkjebø	Félix Godefroid	My Heart	2003	
"Rose"	Sissel Kyrkjebø	James Horner	Titanic	1997	
"Rosen (The Rose)"	Sissel Kyrkjebø	Amanda McBroom; Jan Malmsjö	Sissel	1987	
"Roser i Picardy (Roses of Picardy)"	Sissel Kyrkjebø, Syng med oss	Frederic Weatherly; Haydn Wood	Syng med oss – 43 Glade Melodier	1986	
"Saknar dej nu"	Sissel Kyrkjebø	Espen Lind; Mikael Wiehe	Til deg	2010	
"Salley Gardens"	Sissel Kyrkjebø	William Butler Yeats	Into Paradise	2006	
"Sancta Maria"	Sissel Kyrkjebø	trad. Pietro Mascagni	Into Paradise	2006	
"Sarah's Song" (vers. 1)	Sissel Kyrkjebø	Sissel Kyrkjebø; David Forman; Jørn Dahl	All Good Things	2000	
"Sarah's Song" (vers. 2)	Sissel Kyrkjebø	Sissel Kyrkjebø; David Forman; Jørn Dahl	Sissel	2002	
"Sarah's Song" (vers. 3)	Sissel Kyrkjebø	Sissel Kyrkjebø; David Forman; Jørn Dahl	Northern Lights	2007	
"Se ilden lyse (Fire In Your Heart)" (vers. 1) †	Sissel Kyrkjebø; Oslo Gospel Choir	Jan Vincents Johannessen; Svein Gundersen	Innerst i sjelen	1994	
"Se ilden lyse (Fire In Your Heart)" (vers. 2)	Sissel Kyrkjebø; Oslo Gospel Choir	Jan Vincents Johannessen; Svein Gundersen	In Symphony	2001	
"Se over fjellet (Climb Every Mountain)"	Sissel Kyrkjebø; Bergen Filharmoniske Orkester	Oscar Hammerstein II; Richard Rodgers; G. Gjerstad	Soria Moria	1989	
"September Song"	Sissel Kyrkjebø	Maxwell Anderson; Kurt Weill	Reflections II	2019	
"Seterjentens søndag"	Sissel Kyrkjebø, Arve Tellefsen	Jørgen Moe; Ole Bull	Soria Moria	1989	
"Seven Angels"	Sissel Kyrkjebø, Gheorghe Zamfir	Yuho Iwasato; E. Komatsu; Akira Senju	The Best of Sissel	2000	
"Shall We Gather at the River?"	Sissel Kyrkjebø, Bryn Terfel	Robert Lowry	Homeward Bound	2013	
"Shenandoah" (vers. 1)	Sissel Kyrkjebø	trad. Trond Lien	In Symphony	2001	
"Shenandoah" (vers. 2)	Sissel Kyrkjebø	trad.	Sissel	2002	
"She Walks in Beauty"	Sissel Kyrkjebø	Lord Byron; Mychael Danna	Vanity Fair OST	2004	
"Should It Matter" (vers. 1)	Sissel Kyrkjebø	Lene Marlin	All Good Things	2000	
"Should It Matter" (vers. 2)	Sissel Kyrkjebø	Lene Marlin	Sissel	2002	
"Silent Night – Introduction"	Sissel Kyrkjebø	Joseph Mohr; Franz Xaver Gruber	Silent Night: A Christmas in Rome	1999	
"Silent Night" (vers. 1)	Sissel Kyrkjebø; Plácido Domingo; Charles Aznavour	Joseph Mohr; Franz Xaver Gruber	Christmas in Vienna III	1995	
"Silent Night" (vers. 2)	Sissel Kyrkjebø; Máire Brennan; Harlem Gospel Choir; Montserrat Caballé; Zucchero; Pietro Ballo	Joseph Mohr; Franz Xaver Gruber	Silent Night: A Christmas in Rome	1999	
"Silent Night" (vers. 3)	Sissel Kyrkjebø	Joseph Mohr; Franz Xaver Gruber	De beste, 1986–2006	2006	
"Silent Night" (vers. 4)	Sissel Kyrkjebø; Plácido Domingo; José Carreras	Joseph Mohr; Franz Xaver Gruber	Christmas in Moscow	2014	
"Siúil A Rúin"	Sissel Kyrkjebø, The Chieftains	trad.	Tears of Stone	1999	
"Slow Down"	Sissel Kyrkjebø; The Mormon Tabernacle Choir	Chuck Girard	Reflections II	2019	
"Slummens datter"	Sissel Kyrkjebø	Erik Hillestad; Sigvart Dagsland	Soria Moria	1989	
"Sofðu unga ástin mín"	Sissel Kyrkjebø	trad.	Nordisk Vinternatt	2005	
"Solitaire" (vers. 1)	Sissel Kyrkjebø	Neil Sedaka; Phil Cody	Gift of Love	1992	
"Solitaire" (vers. 2)	Sissel Kyrkjebø	Neil Sedaka; Phil Cody	In Symphony	2001	
"Solitaire" (vers. 3)	Sissel Kyrkjebø	Neil Sedaka; Phil Cody	Sissel	2002	
"Someone Like You"	Sissel Kyrkjebø	Richard Marx	My Heart	2004	
"Som fagre blomen"	Sissel Kyrkjebø	Anders Hovden; Hallgrímur Pétursson; Hans Thomissøn; Per Kolstad	Innerst i sjelen	1994	
"Sommerdrøm"	Sissel Kyrkjebø	Stig Nilsson; Svein Gundersen	Soria Moria	1989	
"Somewhere"	Sissel Kyrkjebø	Stephen Sondheim; Leonard Bernstein	Soria Moria	1989	
"Soria Moria"	Sissel Kyrkjebø	Stig Nilsson; Svein Gundersen	Soria Moria	1989	
"Stevtone"	Sissel Kyrkjebø	trad. Per Kolstad	Innerst i sjelen	1994	
"Still, still, still"	Sissel Kyrkjebø	trad.	Christmas in Moscow	2014	
"Stilla natt (Silent Night)"	Sissel Kyrkjebø	Joseph Mohr; Franz Xaver Gruber	Stilla Natt	1987	
"Stolt Margjit"	Sissel Kyrkjebø	trad. Per Kolstad	Innerst i sjelen	1994	
"Sukiyaki"	Sissel Kyrkjebø	Hachidai Nakamura; Peter Mynte	De beste, 1986–2006	2006	
"Summer Snow" †	Sissel Kyrkjebø, Gheorghe Zamfir	trad. Yuho Iwasato; E. Komatsu; Akira Senju	The Best of Sissel	2000	
"Summertime"	Sissel Kyrkjebø	George Gershwin	Sissel	1986	
"Surrender"	Sissel Kyrkjebø	Doc Pomus; Mort Shuman; Ernesto De Curtis	Reflections II	2019	
"Syng kun i din ungdoms vår"	Sissel Kyrkjebø	Johan Diederich Behrens; Friedrich Silcher	De beste, 1986–2006	2006	
"Tänd ett ljus"	Sissel Kyrkjebø	Ingela Forsman; Svein Gundersen	Sissel	1987	
"Tätt intill dej"	Sissel Kyrkjebø	Steven Sheehan; Tom Damphier; Py Bäckman	Til deg	2010	
"Tenn et lys for dem"	Sissel Kyrkjebø	Trygve Henrik Hoff; Svein Gundersen	Sissel	1986	
"The Deep and Timeless Sea"	Sissel Kyrkjebø	James Horner	Back to Titanic	1998	
"The First Time Ever I Saw Your Face"	Sissel Kyrkjebø	Ewan MacColl	Reflections II	2019	
"The Gift of Love" †	Sissel Kyrkjebø; Oslo Gospel Choir	Billy Steinberg; Susanna Hoffs; Tom Kelly	Gift of Love	1992	
"The Last Debate"	Sissel Kyrkjebø (as Asëa Aranion)	Howard Shore	Music of The Lord of the Rings film series	2007	
"The Man I Love"	Sissel Kyrkjebø	Ira Gershwin; George Gershwin	Reflections II	2019	
"The Masquerade is Over"	Sissel Kyrkjebø	Herb Magidson; Allie Wrubel	Reflections II	2019	
"The Nutcracker Suite, Op. 71a: Waltz Of The Flowers"	Sissel Kyrkjebø	Pyotr Ilyich Tchaikovsky	Christmas in Moscow	2014	
"The Sleeping Princess" (vers. 1)	Sissel Kyrkjebø	Henry G. Chapman; Alexander Porfir’yevich Borodin	My Heart	2003	
"The Sleeping Princess" (vers. 2)	Sissel Kyrkjebø	Henry G. Chapman; Alexander Porfir’yevich Borodin	Into Paradise	2006	
"The Twelve Days of Christmas"	Sissel Kyrkjebø; Charles Aznavour	trad.	Christmas in Vienna III	1995	
"The Very Thought of You"	Sissel Kyrkjebø	Ray Noble	Reflections IV	2020	
"Things"	Sissel Kyrkjebø, Rune Larsen	Bobby Darin	Røtter	1992	
"Three Times a Lady"	Sissel Kyrkjebø	Lionel Richie	Reflections III	2019	
"Tiðin rennur"	Sissel Kyrkjebø	Fríðrikur Petersen; Jógvan Waagstein	Innerst i sjelen	1994	
"Till the end of Time"	Sissel Kyrkjebø	Buddy Kaye; Ted Mossman; Frédéric Chopin	Reflections IV	2020	
"Titanic Suite"	Sissel Kyrkjebø	James Horner	Back to Titanic	1998	
"Tristezze"	Sissel Kyrkjebø	Francis Giacobetti; Frédéric Chopin	My Heart	2004	
"Udsigt fra Fløien"	Sissel Kyrkjebø, Syng med oss	Henrik Jansen; Thorvald Nielsen	Syng med oss – 43 Glade Melodier	1986	
"Unable To Stay, Unwilling To Leave"	Sissel Kyrkjebø	James Horner	Titanic	1997	
"Un Enfant Est Né"	Sissel Kyrkjebø, Charles Aznavour	Charles Aznavour; George Garvarentz	Christmas in Vienna III	1995	
"Ung Åslaug"	Sissel Kyrkjebø	Kristofer Janson; Kristoffer Fuglem	De beste, 1986–2006	2006	
"Unchained Melody"	Sissel Kyrkjebø	Hy Zaret; Alex North	Reflections I	2019	
"Up to the Mountain"	Sissel Kyrkjebø	Patty Griffin	Reflections V	2020	
"Upp gläd er alla"	Sissel Kyrkjebø, Odd Nordstoga	Thomas Kingo; Py Bäckman; Odd Nordstoga	Strålande jul	2009	
"Upp gledjest alle, gledjest no"	Sissel Kyrkjebø, Odd Nordstoga	Elias Blix; Thomas Kingo; Odd Nordstoga	Strålande jul	2009	
"Vatnet, våren og fela"	Sissel Kyrkjebø	trad.	Innerst i sjelen, bonus track	1994	
"Veien er ditt mål (Road To Zion)"	Sissel Kyrkjebø	Mike Hudson; Erik Hillestad	Soria Moria	1989	
"Velkommen hjem" #	Sissel Kyrkjebø	Victoria Shaw; Sarah Buxton; Gary Burr; Guren Hagen	Til deg	2010	
"Velkommen hjem"	Sissel Kyrkjebø, Poul Krebs	Victoria Shaw; Sarah Buxton; Gary Burr; Guren Hagen	Til deg	2010	
"Velkommen igen"	Sissel Kyrkjebø	N.F.S. Grundtvig; C.E.F. Weyse	Strålande jul	2009	
"Vem" †	Sissel Kyrkjebø	Lasse Holm	Sissel	1987	
"Venn" †	Sissel Kyrkjebø, Forente artister	Espen Lind; Lene Marlin	Venn	2005	
"Å Vestland, Vestland" (vers. 1)	Sissel Kyrkjebø	Tore Ørjasæter; Sigurd Førsund	Sissel	1986	
"Å Vestland, Vestland"" (vers. 2)	Sissel Kyrkjebø	Tore Ørjasæter; Sigurd Førsund	In Symphony	2001	
"Vil du vekke tonen min?"	Sissel Kyrkjebø, Sigmund Groven	Nikos Ignatiadis; Giannis Parios; Haris Alexiou; Eyvind Skeie	Sissel	1986	
"Vilja sangen (Vilja Song)"	Sissel Kyrkjebø	Leo Stein; Viktor Léon; Franz Lehár	De beste, 1986–2006	2006	
"Vinterbarn"	Sissel Kyrkjebø, Proffene	Trond Nordvik	Handsfree	2001	
"Vitae Lux" (vers. 1)	Sissel Kyrkjebø	Ivar Dyrhaug; Frode Alnæs	In Symphony	2001	
"Vitae Lux" (vers. 2)	Sissel Kyrkjebø	Ivar Dyrhaug; Frode Alnæs	Into Paradise	2006	
"Vitae Lux" (vers. 3)	Sissel Kyrkjebø; Mormon Tabernacle Choir	Ivar Dyrhaug; Frode Alnæs	Spirit of the Season	2007	
"Våkn opp, min sjel"	Sissel Kyrkjebø	Thomas Kingo; Per Kolstad	Innerst i sjelen	1994	
"Våren (Last Spring)"	Sissel Kyrkjebø	Aasmund Olavsson Vinje; Edvard Grieg	In Symphony	2001	
"Vår løynde strand (Sto Perigiali To Kryfo)"	Sissel Kyrkjebø, Syng med oss	Giorgos Seferis; Mikis Theodorakis; S. Selvig	Syng med oss – 43 Glade Melodier	1986	
"Vårvise" †	Sissel Kyrkjebø, Sebastian	Sebastian	Sissel	1987	
"Vårvindar friska"	Sissel Kyrkjebø	Julia Nyberg trad.	Nordisk Vinternatt	2005	
"Wachet auf, ruft uns die Stimme"	Sissel Kyrkjebø	Philipp Nicolai; Johann Sebastian Bach	Into Paradise	2006	
"Wait A While"	Sissel Kyrkjebø	Samantha Brown; Jon Lord	My Heart	2003	
"Walk away"	Sissel Kyrkjebø	Don Black; Udo Jürgens	Reflections V	2020	
"We Both Know" (vers. 1)	Sissel Kyrkjebø	Lene Marlin	All Good Things	2000	
"We Both Know" (vers. 2)	Sissel Kyrkjebø	Lene Marlin	Sissel	2002	
"We'll Meet Again"	Sissel Kyrkjebø	Ross Parker; Hughie Charles	Reflections V	2020	
"Weightless" (vers. 1)	Sissel Kyrkjebø	Rick Chertoff; David Forman; Rob Hyman; Gary Lucas	All Good Things	2000	
"Weightless" (vers. 2)	Sissel Kyrkjebø	Rick Chertoff; David Forman; Rob Hyman; Gary Lucas	Sissel	2002	
"Welcome to My World"	Sissel Kyrkjebø	Ray Winkler; John Hathcock	Reflections II	2019	
"What a Wonderful World"	Sissel Kyrkjebø	Bob Thiele; George David Weiss	Reflections V	2020	
"What Are We Made Of?"	Sissel Kyrkjebø, Brian May	Brian May	The Adventures of Pinocchio	1996	
"What Child Is This?" (vers. 1)	Sissel Kyrkjebø; Oslo Gospel Choir	William Chatterton Dix	Live	1990	
"What Child Is This?" (vers. 2)	Sissel Kyrkjebø	William Chatterton Dix	Into Paradise	2006	
"When a Child Is Born"	Sissel Kyrkjebø; Plácido Domingo; Charles Aznavour	Fred Jay	Christmas in Vienna III	1995	
"When a Man Loves a Woman"	Sissel Kyrkjebø	Calvin Lewis; Andrew Wright	Reflections IV	2020	
"When I Fall in Love"	Sissel Kyrkjebø	Edward Heyman; Victor Young	Reflections V	2020	
"Whence is That Goodly Fragrance Flowing?"	Sissel Kyrkjebø, Ole Edvard Antonsen	trad.	Julekonserten	1995	
"When Will My Heart Arise"	Sissel Kyrkjebø	trad. Brendan Graham; Roger Emerson	Northern Lights	2007	
"When You Wish Upon a Star"	Sissel Kyrkjebø	Leigh Harline; Ned Washington	Reflections III	2019	
"Where The Lost Ones Go" †	Sissel Kyrkjebø, Espen Lind	Espen Lind; Magnus Rostadmo	All Good Things	2000	
"Where The Lost Ones Go"	Sissel Kyrkjebø, Espen Lind	Espen Lind; Magnus Rostadmo	In Symphony	2001	
"Who Knows Where the Time Goes?"	Sissel Kyrkjebø	Sandy Denny	Reflections I	2019	
"You Don't Bring Me Flowers"	Sissel Kyrkjebø	Neil Diamond; Alan and Marilyn Bergman	De beste, 1986–2006	2006	
"You Raise Me Up"	Sissel Kyrkjebø	Brendan Graham; Rolf Løvland	My Heart	2004	
"You Were Always on My Mind"	Sissel Kyrkjebø	Wayne Carson; Johnny Christopher; Mark James	Reflections III	2019	
"Your Sky"	Sissel Kyrkjebø	Sissel Kyrkjebø; Kjetil Bjerkestrand	Northern Lights	2007	

== Unreleased/rare/unfinished/performed songs ==
Song	Artist	Writer(s)	Year	Ref.
"A Nightingale Sang in Berkeley Square" (Norwegian)	Sissel Kyrkjebø	Eric Maschwitz, Manning Sherwin	1985	
"Aftenbønn (Løft du ditt åsyn over meg i natt)"	Sissel Kyrkjebø	Per Aa. Tveit, Eyvind Skeie	2008	
"Ain't No Mountain High Enough"	Sissel Kyrkjebø	Ashford & Simpson	2015	
"Akk mon min vei til Kanaan"	Sissel Kyrkjebø	O. Skullerud	2007	
"Aldri mer"	Sissel Kyrkjebø	Juul Hansen, Håkon Tveten	1986	
"All I Ask of You"	Sissel Kyrkjebø, José Carreras	Richard Stilgoe, Charles Hart, A.L. Webber	1995	
"All Shook Up"	Sissel Kyrkjebø, Øyvind Blunck	Otis Blackwell, Elvis Presley	1991	
"All You Need Is Love"	Sissel Kyrkjebø	Lennon–McCartney	2015	
"Älskliga blommor små"	Sissel Kyrkjebø	Evert Taube	1986	
"Amazing Grace"	Sissel Kyrkjebø, Diana Krall	John Newton	2000	
"Amigos Para Siempre"	Sissel Kyrkjebø, José Carreras, Ilona Tokody	Don Black, Andrew Lloyd Webber	1995	
"Anna Lovinda"	Sissel Kyrkjebø, Bjørn Eidsvåg, Åge Aleksandersen	Erik Bye	2006	
"Anything You Can Do (I Can Do Better)"	Sissel Kyrkjebø, Helge Jordal	Irving Berlin		
"Augustin"	Sissel Kyrkjebø	Åke Gerhard, Harry Sandin	1985	
"Auld Lang Syne" (solo)	Sissel Kyrkjebø	Robert Burns	2008	
"Auld Lang Syne"	Sissel Kyrkjebø, Peter Jöback	Robert Burns	2004	
"Ave Maria"	Sissel Kyrkjebø, Taro Ichihara	Johann Sebastian Bach, Charles Gounod	1994	
"Ave Maris Stella"	Sissel Kyrkjebø	trad.	2006	
"Baby, It's Cold Outside"	Sissel Kyrkjebø	Frank Loesser	2018	
"Baby Now That I've Found You"	Sissel Kyrkjebø	Tony Macaulay, John MacLeod	2011	
"Bare Sol! Bare Sol! Bare Sol!"	Sissel Kyrkjebø	Cato Blom, Alf Pettersen		
"Barn av regnbuen"	Sissel Kyrkjebø	Lillebjørn Nilsen	2003	
"Before He Cheats"	Sissel Kyrkjebø	Josh Kear, Chris Tompkins	2016	
"Bella Notte"	Sissel Kyrkjebø	Peggy Lee, Sonny Burke	1998	
"Ben Bolt"	Sissel Kyrkjebø	Nelson Kneass	1986	
"Benedictus"	Sissel Kyrkjebø	Felicity Laurence	2012	
"Bergenspotpourri"	Sissel Kyrkjebø	Hans Wiers-Jenssen, Johan Nordahl Brun, trad.	1989	
"Bess, You Is My Woman Now"	Sissel Kyrkjebø, Hans Josefsson	Ira Gershwin, George Gershwin	1987	
"Bess, You Is My Woman Now"	Sissel Kyrkjebø, Krister St. Hill	Ira Gershwin, George Gershwin	1988	
"Blant alle guder"	Sissel Kyrkjebø	Petter Dass	1991	
"Blott en dag"	Sissel Kyrkjebø	Lina Sandell	1990	
"Blue Christmas"	Sissel Kyrkjebø	Billy Hayes, Jay W. Johnson	2024	
"Bohus bataljon"	Sissel Kyrkjebø	Axel Flodén, Sten Frykberg	1986	
"Brent av ildens glød"	Sissel Kyrkjebø	Kjetil Bjerkestrand	2008	
"Bridge Over Troubled Water"	Sissel Kyrkjebø	Paul Simon	2022	
"Bridge Over Troubled Water"	Sissel Kyrkjebø, Russell Watson	Paul Simon	2002	
"Brydlopsdigt"	Sissel Kyrkjebø			
"Burning Love"	Sissel Kyrkjebø, Various Artists	Dennis Linde, Felton Jarvis	2018	
"Bydlor (Sleep)"	Sissel Kyrkjebø	Modest Mussorgsky		
"Bønn"	Sissel Kyrkjebø	Kjetil Bjerkestrand	2008	
"California Dreamin'"	Sissel Kyrkjebø	John Phillips, Michelle Phillips	1992	
"Can't Help Falling in Love" (solo)	Sissel Kyrkjebø	Hugo Peretti, Luigi Creatore, George David Weiss	1991	
"Can't Help Falling in Love"	Sissel Kyrkjebø, Carola Häggkvist	Hugo Peretti, Luigi Creatore, George David Weiss	1991	
"Can't Help Lovin' Dat Man"	Sissel Kyrkjebø	Oscar Hammerstein II, Jerome Kern	1989	
"Carmen Gratulatorium"	Sissel Kyrkjebø	Bugge Wesseltoft	2000	
"Che gelida manina"	Sissel Kyrkjebø, Taro Ichihara	Giacomo Puccini	1994	
"Climb Every Mountain"	Sissel Kyrkjebø	Oscar Hammerstein II, Richard Rodgers	1994	
"Comin' In and Out of Your Life"	Sissel Kyrkjebø	Richard Parker, Bobby Whiteside	1986	
"Cowboyhelten (Einar, du er min aller beste venn)"	Sissel Kyrkjebø	Åsta Hjelm	2003	
"Crazy Love"	Sissel Kyrkjebø	Van Morrison	2011	
"Da Doo Ron Ron"	Sissel Kyrkjebø, Åge Aleksandersen, Hanne Boel	Phil Spector, Jeff Barry, Ellie Greenwich	2011	
"Daggryet bryter (Morning Has Broken)"	Sissel Kyrkjebø	Eleanor Farjeon, trad.	1984	
"De to"	Sissel Kyrkjebø	Sven-Olaf Sandberg, Gunnel Andrén	1986	
"Deilig er den himmel blå"	Sissel Kyrkjebø	Nikolai Frederik Severin Grundtvig	2012	
"Den dag kjem aldri"	Sissel Kyrkjebø	Aasmund Olavsson Vinje	2014	
"Der det nye livet lever"	Sissel Kyrkjebø	Per Tveit, Vidar Kristensen	2008	
"Det beste som er (My Favorite Things)"	Sissel Kyrkjebø	Oscar Hammerstein II, Richard Rodgers	1988	
"Det hender sig ofte"	Sissel Kyrkjebø	Petter Dass, Ole Olsen	1991	
"Det sikreste vårtegn"	Sissel Kyrkjebø	Haakon B. Nielson	1986	
"Det var tider det (Those Were the Days)"	Sissel Kyrkjebø	Boris Fomin, Gene Raskin	1990	
"Die Csárdásfürstin"	Sissel Kyrkjebø, Kjell Magnus Sandve	Emmerich Kálmán	1986	
"Ding Dong Merrily on High"	Sissel Kyrkjebø	George Ratcliffe Woodward, trad.	1998	
"Don't Cry for Me Argentina"	Sissel Kyrkjebø	Tim Rice, Andrew Lloyd Webber	1989	
"Do-Re-Mi" (Norwegian)	Sissel Kyrkjebø	O. Hammerstein II, R. Rodgers, Gunnar Jørstad	1988	
"Dormi, dormi, bel Bambin"	Sissel Kyrkjebø			
"Dovregubbens hall"	Sissel Kyrkjebø	Henrik Ibsen, Edvard Grieg	2008	
"Dream a Little Dream of Me"	Sissel Kyrkjebø, Diana Krall	Gus Kahn	2000	
"Dreamthoughts (Tonerna)"	Sissel Kyrkjebø			
"Driving Home for Christmas"	Sissel Kyrkjebø	Chris Rea	2015	
"Drøm"	Sissel Kyrkjebø	Otto Carlmar, Karl Tast	1986	
"Du är den ende (Forbidden Games)"	Sissel Kyrkjebø, Anders Ekborg	B. Parker, Marc Lanjean	2007	
"Du fugl som flyver i luften"	Sissel Kyrkjebø	trad.	1984	
"Du kjære"	Sissel Kyrkjebø	Jef Romanoff, Einar Rose, Sven Olof Sandberg	1986	
"Duetto buffo di due gatti"	Sissel Kyrkjebø, Eddie Skoller	Gioachino Rossini	1990	
"Du skal få en dag i mårå"	Sissel Kyrkjebø	Alf Prøysen	2005	
"Du som elsker, du som ser"	Sissel Kyrkjebø	Per Tveit	2008	
"Eatnemen Vuelie"	Sissel Kyrkjebø	Frode Fjellheim	2019	
"Edelweiss"	Sissel Kyrkjebø	Oscar Hammerstein II, Richard Rodgers	1986	
"Eg ser"	Sissel Kyrkjebø, Bjørn Eidsvåg	Bjørn Eidsvåg	2011	
"Eg veit meg et land (Barndomsminne fra Nordland)"	Sissel Kyrkjebø	Elias Blix	2020	
"Elselil"	Sissel Kyrkjebø	Robert Schønfeld		
"Endgame" (from Chess)	Sissel Kyrkjebø, Tommy Körberg	Tim Rice, Benny Andersson, Björn Ulvaeus	1989	
"En liten blåveis"	Sissel Kyrkjebø	Hermann Hermani		
"En lugn liten vrå"	Sissel Kyrkjebø	Lasse Dahlquist		
"En rose har utsprunget"	Sissel Kyrkjebø	trad.	1991	
"En yndig og frydefuld sommertid"	Sissel Kyrkjebø	trad.	1989	
"Et bitte lite miniskjørt"	Sissel Kyrkjebø	Vidar Sandbeck	1985	
"Et lite barn"	Sissel Kyrkjebø	trad.	2004	
"Eventyrland"	Sissel Kyrkjebø	Arthur Bernard Sars	1986	
"Evergreen"	Sissel Kyrkjebø	Paul Williams, Barbra Streisand	1983	
"Ev'ry Time We Say Goodbye"	Sissel Kyrkjebø, Diana Krall	Cole Porter	2000	
"Feliz Navidad"	Sissel Kyrkjebø	José Feliciano	2019	
"Fever"	Sissel Kyrkjebø	Eddie Cooley, Otis Blackwell	2014	
"Fiskevise"	Sissel Kyrkjebø		1991	
"Fjeldveivisen"	Sissel Kyrkjebø	Hans Wiers-Jensen, trad.		
"Fly Me to the Moon"	Sissel Kyrkjebø, Kurt Nilsen	Bart Howard	2003	
"For alltid"	Sissel Kyrkjebø	Ole Paus, J. S. Bach	2016	
"Fola fola Blakken"	Sissel Kyrkjebø	Johan Nordahl Brun Rolfsen, Edvard Grieg		
"For Once in My Life"	Sissel Kyrkjebø	Ron Miller, Orlando Murden	2016	
"Forbidden Games" (solo)	Sissel Kyrkjebø	B. Parker, Marc Lanjean		
"Forbidden Games"	Sissel Kyrkjebø, Plácido Domingo	B. Parker, Marc Lanjean	2005	
"Fordi jeg måtte (My Way)"	Sissel Kyrkjebø	Paul Anka, Claude François, Jacques Revaux	1986	
"Fuldmånen stille smiler"	Sissel Kyrkjebø	trad.	1986	
"Förälskad i Köpenhamn"	Sissel Kyrkjebø	Sejr Volmer Sørensen, Bent Fabricius-Bjerre	1989	
"Get Together"	Sissel Kyrkjebø, Oslo Gospel Choir	Jan Groth, Tore W. Aas	1990	
"Gjendines bådnlåt"	Sissel Kyrkjebø	Edvard Grieg	2010	
"Gjør døren høy"	Sissel Kyrkjebø	Magnus Brostrup Landstad	2006	
"Godt nytt år (1939-valsen)"	Sissel Kyrkjebø	Rolf Sørli	1986	
"Gollum's Song"	Sissel Kyrkjebø	Howard Shore	2004	
"Gone at Last"	Sissel Kyrkjebø	Paul Simon	2013	
"Go Tell It on the Mountain"	Sissel Kyrkjebø	trad.	2014	
"Guttelokk"	Sissel Kyrkjebø	trad.	2007	
"Hallelujah"	Sissel Kyrkjebø	Georg Friedrich Händel	2004	
"Happy Xmas (War Is Over)"	Sissel Kyrkjebø	John Lennon, Yoko Ono, trad.	1986	
"Har en drøm" (solo)	Sissel Kyrkjebø	Trygve Henrik Hoff, Svein Gundersen	1992	
"Har en drøm"	Sissel Kyrkjebø, Jørn Hoel	Trygve Henrik Hoff, Svein Gundersen	1988	
"Har en drøm (om et eventyr)"	Sissel Kyrkjebø, Various Artists	Svein Gundersen	1991	
"He Ain't Heavy, He's My Brother"	Sissel Kyrkjebø	Bob Russell, Bobby Scott	2016	
"Heart of Africa"	Sissel Kyrkjebø		1994	
"Heaven Help Us All"	Sissel Kyrkjebø	Ron Miller	2018	
"Herre Gud, ditt dyre navn og ære"	Sissel Kyrkjebø	Petter Dass	2003	
"Hey Jude"	Sissel Kyrkjebø, Various Artists	Paul McCartney, John Lennon	2018	
"Hotel California"	Sissel Kyrkjebø	Don Felder, Don Henley, Glenn Frey	2011	
"Hurra for deg som fyller ditt år!"	Sissel Kyrkjebø	Margrethe Munthe	2018	
"Hvor er du?"	Sissel Kyrkjebø	Fred A. Fredhøi, K. Ingemann Pedersen	1986	
"Hvorfor er det meg?"	Sissel Kyrkjebø, Karoline Krüger	Karoline Krüger	1984	
"Hymn to Freedom"	Sissel Kyrkjebø	Oscar Peterson	2019	
"Härlig är jorden"	Sissel Kyrkjebø	B. S. Ingemann, C. Bååth-Holmberg, trad.	2015	
"Håll mitt hjärta"	Sissel Kyrkjebø	Björn Skifs	2016	
"Høye fjell, de gjør himlen trang"	Sissel Kyrkjebø	O.Skavlan, trad.	1986	
"Höga Majestät"	Sissel Kyrkjebø	Samuel Johan Hedborn	2006	
"Idas sommarvisa"	Sissel Kyrkjebø	Astrid Lindgren, Georg Riedel	2007	
"I Dreamed a Dream"	Sissel Kyrkjebø	Herbert Kretzmer, Claude-Michel Schönberg	2011	
"I Feel Pretty"	Sissel Kyrkjebø	Stephen Sondheim, Leonard Bernstein	1989	
"I Have a Dream"	Sissel Kyrkjebø	Benny Andersson, Björn Ulvaeus	2019	
"I Have a Love/One Hand, One Heart"	Sissel Kyrkjebø, Peter Jöback	Stephen Sondheim, Leonard Bernstein	2004	
"I himmelen, i himmelen"	Sissel Kyrkjebø	Laurentius Laurinius	1991	
"I Know Him So Well"	Sissel Kyrkjebø, Judy Kuhn	Tim Rice, Benny Andersson, Björn Ulvaeus	1989	
"I'll Sing of Love"	Sissel Kyrkjebø, Darryl Tookes	Darryl Tookes	2013	
"I Love to Love"	Sissel Kyrkjebø	Jack Robinson, James Bolden	2001	
"I Love You"	Sissel Kyrkjebø	Harlan Thompson, Harry Archer, Mogens Dam	1986	
"Imagine"	Sissel Kyrkjebø, Various Artists	John Lennon	2002	
"In Dreams"	Sissel Kyrkjebø	Roy Orbison	2016	
"Ingrids vise"	Sissel Kyrkjebø	Bjørnstjerne Bjørnson, Halfdan Kjerulf	2010	
"Into the West"	Sissel Kyrkjebø	Howard Shore	2004	
"Island in the Sun"	Sissel Kyrkjebø	Lord Burgess, Harry Belafonte	1995	
"It Had to Be You"	Sissel Kyrkjebø	Gus Kahn, Isham Jones	2014	
"It's the Most Wonderful Time of the Year"	Sissel Kyrkjebø	Edward Pola, George Wyle	2018	
"Ja, må han leva"	Sissel Kyrkjebø	trad.	2018	
"Ja, vi elsker dette landet"	Sissel Kyrkjebø, Various Artists	Bjørnstjerne Bjørnson, Rikard Nordraak	2014	
"Ja, vi elsker dette landet" (solo)	Sissel Kyrkjebø	Bjørnstjerne Bjørnson, Rikard Nordraak	2020	
"Jag bär dig (Don't Give Up)"	Sissel Kyrkjebø, Peter Jöback	Peter Gabriel	2009	
"Jag tror på sommaren"	Sissel Kyrkjebø	Stig Olin	2016	
"Jeg elsker dig"	Sissel Kyrkjebø	Hans Christian Andersen, Edvard Grieg	2010	
"Jeg er pen i klær’ne!"	Sissel Kyrkjebø	Richard Westergård		
"Jeg er så forelsket om våren"	Sissel Kyrkjebø	Arne Svendsen, Leif Enger	1986	
"Jeg lagde meg så silde"	Sissel Kyrkjebø, Plácido Domingo	trad.	2005	
"Jeg råde vil alle"	Sissel Kyrkjebø			
"Jeg ved en lærkerede (Now the Day Is Over)"	Sissel Kyrkjebø	Sabine Baring-Gould, J. Barnby	2007	
"Jeg vil bare ha en mann"	Sissel Kyrkjebø	Eduardo "Doddo" Andersen	2003	
"Jenta i Havanna (Flickan i Havanna)"	Sissel Kyrkjebø	Evert Taube	1987	
"Jesu, vi dig nu kalde på"	Sissel Kyrkjebø		1991	
"Je te veux"	Sissel Kyrkjebø	Erik Satie	2009	
"Jingle Bells"	Sissel Kyrkjebø	James Lord Pierpont	1996	
"Joshua Fit the Battle of Jericho"	Sissel Kyrkjebø	trad.	2014	
"Joy to the World"	Sissel Kyrkjebø	Isaac Watts	2004	
"Julekveldsvisa" (solo)	Sissel Kyrkjebø	Alf Prøysen, Arnljot Høyland	1989	
"Julekveldsvisa"	Sissel Kyrkjebø, Rune Larsen	Alf Prøysen, Arnljot Høyland	1996	
"Jul, jul, strålande jul" (solo)	Sissel Kyrkjebø	Edvard Evers, Gustaf Nordquist	2014	
"Juster (I'll Be Missing You)"	Sissel Kyrkjebø, Thomas Giertsen	Thomas Giertsen, Sting		
"Jørgen Hattemaker"	Sissel Kyrkjebø, Erik Bye, Vidar Lønn-Arnesen	Alf Prøysen, Bjarne Amdahl	1994	
"Jørgensens amerikanske hvetebrøds marsj"	Sissel Kyrkjebø	Henrik Jansen, Adolf Hansen	1986	
"Kan du glemme gamle Norge"	Sissel Kyrkjebø	Anton Sannes, F. A. Falkenberg	1986	
"Kimer, I klokker"	Sissel Kyrkjebø	Grundtvig, Magnus Brostrup Landstad, trad.	2014	
"Kinn mot kinn (Cheek to Cheek)"	Sissel Kyrkjebø	Irving Berlin	1985	
"Kitchen Polka"	Sissel Kyrkjebø		2007	
"Kjempeviseslåtten"	Sissel Kyrkjebø	Harald Sæverud		
"Kjærlighetsvise"	Sissel Kyrkjebø	Bjørnstjerne Bjørnson	1991	
"Kling no klokka"	Sissel Kyrkjebø	Elias Blix	2003	
"Kom mai du skjønne milde"	Sissel Kyrkjebø	D. Jæger, Wolfgang Amadeus Mozart	2008	
"Kystland"	Sissel Kyrkjebø	Alf Larsen	1991	
"Lean on Me"	Sissel Kyrkjebø, Hanne Boel, Lisa Ekdahl, Kine	Bill Withers	2004	
"Leis An Lurgainn (Boat Song)"	Sissel Kyrkjebø	trad.	1994	
"Let It Be"	Sissel Kyrkjebø	Lennon–McCartney	2018	
"Let Your Love Flow"	Sissel Kyrkjebø	Larry E. Williams	2016	
"Lilla vackra Anna"	Sissel Kyrkjebø	Bengt Henrik Alstermark	2009	
"Liten sommervise"	Sissel Kyrkjebø	Sissel Kyrkjebø, Kjetil Bjerkestrand	2008	
"Live and Let Die"	Sissel Kyrkjebø	Paul McCartney, Linda McCartney	2011	
"Lollipop"	Sissel Kyrkjebø, Rune Larsen, Tor Endresen	Julius Dixson, Beverly Ross	1989	
"Love Is All Around"	Sissel Kyrkjebø	Reg Presley	2016	
"Love Me or Leave Me"	Sissel Kyrkjebø	Gus Kahn, Walter Donaldson	2011	
"Love, oh Love"	Sissel Kyrkjebø, Stig Rossen	Lionel Richie	1995	
"Love, Will You Marry Me?"	Sissel Kyrkjebø	trad.	1997	
"Lux illuxit"	Sissel Kyrkjebø	trad.	1991	
"Lys og varme"	Sissel Kyrkjebø, Åge Aleksandersen	Åge Aleksandersen	2011	
"Lær meg å kjenne dine veie"	Sissel Kyrkjebø	Jacob Paulli	2002	
"Madam Felle"	Sissel Kyrkjebø	trad.	1986	
"Magnus hymne"	Sissel Kyrkjebø	trad.	1991	
"Make You Feel My Love"	Sissel Kyrkjebø	Bob Dylan	2014	
"Manic Monday"	Sissel Kyrkjebø	Prince	2011	
"Marina"	Sissel Kyrkjebø	Rocco Granata	1984	
"Marias vaggsång (Mariä Wiegenlied)"	Sissel Kyrkjebø, Karoline Krüger, Felicity Laurence	Evelyn Lindström, Max Reger	1989	
"Marry Me"	Sissel Kyrkjebø	Dolly Parton	2009	
"Mary's Boy Child"	Sissel Kyrkjebø, Rune Larsen	Jester Hairston	1989	
"MC-valsen"	Sissel Kyrkjebø	Arne Svendsen, Kolbjørn Svendsen		
"Medinetterne (Suzy)"	Sissel Kyrkjebø	Henri Christiné, Alfred Kjerulf, Carl Arctander	1986	
"Mellom barken og veden"	Sissel Kyrkjebø, Karoline Krüger, Sigvart Dagsland			
"Men går jag över ängarna"	Sissel Kyrkjebø, Göran Fristorp	Nils Ferlin	1989	
"Messiah"	Sissel Kyrkjebø	George Frideric Handel		
"Mest av alt (I Love You Because)"	Sissel Kyrkjebø	Leon Payne	1985	
"Min Bön (The Prayer)"	Sissel Kyrkjebø, Peter Jöback	T. Rangström, Carole Bayer Sager & David Foster	2004	
"Mor (Å, mor la meg legge mitt hode)"	Sissel Kyrkjebø	Harald Olstad, Oscar Hvalbye	1986	
"Morgendagens søsken"	Sissel Kyrkjebø, Various Artists	Eyvind Skeie	1989	
"My Heart Belongs to Daddy"	Sissel Kyrkjebø, Diana Krall	Cole Porter	2000	
"My Heart Will Go On" ^{a}	Sissel Kyrkjebø	James Horner	2012	
"My Sweet Lord"	Sissel Kyrkjebø	George Harrison	2013	
"Mød mig i nat i drømme"	Sissel Kyrkjebø	Christian Hjorth-Clausen, Leo Friedman	1986	
"Nada Sousou"	Sissel Kyrkjebø	Ryoko Moriyama	2003	
"Nights in White Satin (Notte di Luce)"	Sissel Kyrkjebø, Mario Frangoulis	Justin Hayward	2014	
"Nobody Knows the Trouble I've Seen"	Sissel Kyrkjebø	trad.	2014	
"Nocturne"	Sissel Kyrkjebø	Evert Taube	1986	
"Nocturne i nord (Ro din båt på nattsvart fjord)"	Sissel Kyrkjebø	Trygve Henrik Hoff	1988	
"Norge i rødt, hvitt og blått"	Sissel Kyrkjebø	Finn Bø, Arild Feldborg	2020	
"Norge, mitt Norge"	Sissel Kyrkjebø	Theodor Caspari, Alfred Paulsen	1986	
"När det lider mot jul"	Sissel Kyrkjebø	Ruben Liljefors, Jeanna Otherdahl	1998	
"När jag för mig själv i mörka skogen går"	Sissel Kyrkjebø	Wilhem Peterson-Berger, Helena Nyblom		
"Når lillegull ber aftenbønn"	Sissel Kyrkjebø	Claus Frimann Dahl Clasen	1986	
"O Come All Ye Faithful"	Sissel Kyrkjebø	John Francis Wade		
"Oh Happy Day"	Sissel Kyrkjebø	trad.	2013	
"Oiche Chiun (Glade jul)"	Sissel Kyrkjebø		1997	
"O, jul med din glede"	Sissel Kyrkjebø	Gustava Kielland	2013	
"Oklahoma"	Sissel Kyrkjebø	Oscar Hammerstein II, Richard Rodgers	1985	
"Om"	Sissel Kyrkjebø	David Gates, Ole Paus	1992	
"Om det blir for alltid"	Sissel Kyrkjebø		1985	
"Only Love Can Break Your Heart"	Sissel Kyrkjebø	Neil Young	2011	
"Optimist"	Sissel Kyrkjebø	Jahn Teigen, Ove Borøchstein, Knut Meiner	2020	
"O sole mio"	Sissel Kyrkjebø, Triple & Touch	Giovanni Capurro, Eduardo di Capua	1995	
"O sole mio"	Sissel Kyrkjebø, Kalle Moraeus	Giovanni Capurro, Eduardo di Capua	2001	
"O sole mio"	Sissel Kyrkjebø, Four Chinese Tenors	Giovanni Capurro, Eduardo di Capua	2019	
"O store Gud (How Great Thou Art)"	Sissel Kyrkjebø	Carl Boberg	2019	
"O Tannenbaum"	Sissel Kyrkjebø, Plácido Domingo, José Carreras	Ernst Anschütz, trad.	2003	
"Over the Rainbow" (solo)	Sissel Kyrkjebø	E. Y. Harburg, Harold Arlen	2003	
"Over the Rainbow"	Sissel Kyrkjebø, Anne Grete Preus	E. Y. Harburg, Harold Arlen	1994	
"Panis angelicus"	Sissel Kyrkjebø	Thomas Aquinas	2019	
"Pastoralsvit"	Sissel Kyrkjebø	Lars-Erik Larsson	2006	
"Peter Spillemand"	Sissel Kyrkjebø	F. Lynge/I. Bruhn-Bertelsen, M. Werner-Kersten	1986	
"Petite Mari"	Sissel Kyrkjebø	Fred Fisher	1986	
"Pikeønsker fra en veranda"	Sissel Kyrkjebø	Alf Prøysen	1985	
"Prince Igor" (solo)	Sissel Kyrkjebø	Alexander Borodin	2000	
"Prokoreana"	Sissel Kyrkjebø			
"Promanade"	Sissel Kyrkjebø	Modest Mussorgsky		
"Puck"	Sissel Kyrkjebø	Edvard Grieg	2010	
"Puddefjordsvisen"	Sissel Kyrkjebø	trad.	1986	
"Put a Little Love in Your Heart"	Sissel Kyrkjebø	Jackie DeShannon, Randy Myers, Jimmy Holiday	2015	
"Pål sine høner"	Sissel Kyrkjebø	trad.	1989	
"På låven sitter nissen"	Sissel Kyrkjebø	Margrethe Munthe	1998	
"Reach Out and Touch (Somebody's Hand)"	Sissel Kyrkjebø	Nickolas Ashford, Valerie Simpson	2019	
"Receive"	Sissel Kyrkjebø		1990	
"Ren og rettfedig"	Sissel Kyrkjebø	Ole Brattekaas, trad.	2005	
"Rondo amoroso"	Sissel Kyrkjebø	Harald Sæverud	2007	
"Rose of Bethlehem"	Sissel Kyrkjebø	Selah	2014	
"Rosevalley"	Sissel Kyrkjebø	Sissel Kyrkjebø, Kjetil Bjerkestrand	2008	
"Rusalka's Aria"	Sissel Kyrkjebø	Antonín Dvořák		
"Sandy’s song"	Sissel Kyrkjebø	Dolly Parton		
"Sangen til deg"	Sissel Kyrkjebø	Harald Hope, Harald Haugen	1986	
"Sangen til mor"	Sissel Kyrkjebø	trad.		
"Santa Claus Is Coming to Town"	Sissel Kyrkjebø	John Frederick Coots, Haven Gillespie	1998	
"Scarborough Fair"	Sissel Kyrkjebø, Bryn Terfel	trad.	2009	
"Ser du mina händer"	Sissel Kyrkjebø	Nils-Petter Ankarblom, CajsaStina Åkerström	2008	
"Serenade til Aud"	Sissel Kyrkjebø	Per Kolstad		
"She Moved Through the Fair"	Sissel Kyrkjebø, The Chieftains	trad.	2001	
"Shenandoah" (Norwegian)	Sissel Kyrkjebø	trad.	1987	
"Side by Side"	Sissel Kyrkjebø, Kjell Lönnå, Ewert Ljusberg	Harry M. Woods, Gus Kahn	1988	
"Silent Night"	Sissel Kyrkjebø, Karoline Krüger, Göran Fristorp	Joseph Mohr, Franz Xaver Gruber	1989	
"Sjømannsvals (Lett over jordens blanke speil)"	Sissel Kyrkjebø	Elsa Vedbø, Kristian Hauge	1986	
"Skjebnetango"	Sissel Kyrkjebø	Tola, Einar Hilvén	1986	
"Smil"	Sissel Kyrkjebø, Rune, Line, Tonje and Kim Larsen	John Steffensen	1984	
"Smile"	Sissel Kyrkjebø, Mario Frangoulis	John Turner, Geoffrey Parsons, Charlie Chaplin	2014	
"Små grodorna"	Sissel Kyrkjebø	trad.	2014	
"Små, små ord"	Sissel Kyrkjebø		1984	
"Sol ute, sol inne"	Sissel Kyrkjebø	Einar Rose	1986	
"Solveigs sang"	Sissel Kyrkjebø	Henrik Ibsen, Edvard Grieg	1991	
"Solveigs sang"	Sissel Kyrkjebø, Neil Sedaka	Henrik Ibsen, Edvard Grieg	1992	
"Someday My Prince Will Come"	Sissel Kyrkjebø	Larry Morey, Frank Churchill	1999	
"Sommernatt ved fjorden"	Sissel Kyrkjebø	Ketil Bjørnstad	2014	
"Sossidi valsen"	Sissel Kyrkjebø	Norman Ralph, Finn Bø	1986	
"Sov på min arm"	Sissel Kyrkjebø, Peter Jöback, Odd Nordstoga		2009	
"Staffan stalledräng"	Sissel Kyrkjebø	trad.	1998	
"Stille er natten"	Sissel Kyrkjebø			
"Stjernenattens melodi (Fitjartangoen)"	Sissel Kyrkjebø	Torbjørn Moe	1986	
"Story of a Heart"	Sissel Kyrkjebø	Björn Ulvaeus	2011	
"Sunshine & Summertime"	Sissel Kyrkjebø		2011	
"Sukiyaki"	Sissel Kyrkjebø, Atle Antonsen	Hachidai Nakamura, Peter Mynte	2011	
"Svantes lykkelige dag"	Sissel Kyrkjebø	Benny Andersen	2020	
"Svundne netter"	Sissel Kyrkjebø	Einar Fagstad, Kaare Ingemann Pedersen	1986	
"Synnøves sang (Nu tak for alt ifra vi var små)"	Sissel Kyrkjebø	Bjørnstjerne Bjørnson, Halfdan Kjerulf	1985	
"Så går vi rundt om en enebærbusk"	Sissel Kyrkjebø	trad.	2014	
"Så skimrande var aldrig havet"	Sissel Kyrkjebø	Evert Taube	2022	
"Take Me Home, Country Roads"	Sissel Kyrkjebø	Bill Danoff, Taffy Nivert, John Denver	1993	
"Ta-ra-ta-bum-tra-la"	Sissel Kyrkjebø	trad.	1986	
"Tears in Heaven"	Sissel Kyrkjebø	Eric Clapton, Will Jennings	2015	
"Tenk om himlen skulle ramle ned (Hymne à l'amour)"	Sissel Kyrkjebø	Édith Piaf, Marguerite Monnot	1990	
"That's What Friends Are For"	Sissel Kyrkjebø	Burt Bacharach, Carole Bayer Sager	2015	
"The Impossible Dream (The Quest)"	Sissel Kyrkjebø	Joe Darion, Mitch Leigh	2020	
"The Longing"	Sissel Kyrkjebø	Stefan Nilsson	2010	
"The Old Castle"	Sissel Kyrkjebø	Sissel Kyrkjebø, Modest Mussorgsky	2006	
"The Prayer"	Sissel Kyrkjebø, Josh Groban	D. Foster, C. B. Sager, A. Testa, T. Renis	2002	
"The Prayer"	Sissel Kyrkjebø, Andrea Bocelli	D. Foster, C. B. Sager, A. Testa, T. Renis	2019	
"The Rose"	Sissel Kyrkjebø	Amanda McBroom		
"The Sound of Music"	Sissel Kyrkjebø	Oscar Hammerstein II, Richard Rodgers	1987	
"The Star-Spangled Banner"	Sissel Kyrkjebø	Francis Scott Key	2004	
"The Water Is Wide"	Sissel Kyrkjebø, Sigvart Dagsland	trad.	2002	
"Thou Gracious God, Whose Mercy Lends"	Sissel Kyrkjebø		2019	
"Til far"	Sissel Kyrkjebø	J. Dich-Waaller, Herborg Larsen		
"Til ungdommen"	Sissel Kyrkjebø	Nordahl Grieg	2011	
"Time to Say Goodbye (Con te partirò)"	Sissel Kyrkjebø, John Martin Bengtsson	Lucio Quarantotto, Francesco Sartori	2018	
"Time to Say Goodbye (Con te partirò)"	Sissel Kyrkjebø, Andrea Bocelli	Lucio Quarantotto, Francesco Sartori	2019	
"Titanic Overture/Eg veit i himmerik ei borg"	Sissel Kyrkjebø	trad.	2002	
"Tom Pillibi"	Sissel Kyrkjebø	Pierre Cour, André Popp	1985	
"Tomteskur-valsen"	Sissel Kyrkjebø	Sten Bergkvist	1986	
"Tonerna"	Sissel Kyrkjebø	Erik Gustaf Geijer, Carl Sjöberg	2005	
"Tonight"	Sissel Kyrkjebø	Stephen Sondheim, Leonard Bernstein	1989	
"Utsigt fra Fløien"	Sissel Kyrkjebø	Henrik Jansen	2009	
"Valdres-marsj"	Sissel Kyrkjebø, Arve Tellefsen	Johannes Hanssen	1987	
"Vals på Ängön"	Sissel Kyrkjebø	Evert Taube	1986	
"Varmt igen"	Sissel Kyrkjebø, Peter Jöback	Per Gessle	2009	
"Velkommen hjem"	Sissel Kyrkjebø, Carola Häggkvist	Guren Hagen	2010	
"Velkomne med æra"	Sissel Kyrkjebø	Geirr Tveitt	2002	
"Vem kan segla förutan vind?"	Sissel Kyrkjebø	trad.	2001	
"Vi møtes når fullmånen skinner (All By Yourself in the Moonlight)"	Sissel Kyrkjebø	Ralph Butler	1986	
"Viddenes sang"	Sissel Kyrkjebø	Eilif Gulbranson	1986	
"Vil du en eneste nat mig skænke?"	Sissel Kyrkjebø	Paul Sarauw, Oskar Geiger	1986	
"Vil du gifte deg med meg? (Oh Eva, Ain’t You Comin’ Out Tonight)"	Sissel Kyrkjebø		1986	
"Vår Herres klinkekule"	Sissel Kyrkjebø	Erik Bye	2019	
"Vårvise" (solo)	Sissel Kyrkjebø	Sebastian		
"Vårvise"	Sissel Kyrkjebø, Eddie Skoller	Sebastian	1989	
"Wade in the Water"	Sissel Kyrkjebø	trad.	2014	
"Walking Through Fire"	Sissel Kyrkjebø	Espen Lind	2001	
"We Have All the Time in the World"	Sissel Kyrkjebø	Hal David, John Barry	2022	
"What a Wonderful World"	Sissel Kyrkjebø, Mario Frangoulis	Bob Thiele, George David Weiss	2014	
"What Child Is This?"	Sissel Kyrkjebø, Mario Frangoulis	William Chatterton Dix	2014	
"Where the Lost Ones Go"	Sissel Kyrkjebø, Peter Jöback	Espen Lind	2009	
"White Christmas"	Sissel Kyrkjebø	Irving Berlin	1997	
"Winter Wonderland"	Sissel Kyrkjebø, Various Artists	Richard B. Smith, Felix Bernard	1999	
"Without You"	Sissel Kyrkjebø	Pete Ham, Tom Evans	2016	
"Wårwajsa"	Sissel Kyrkjebø	trad.	2005	
"Yellow Bird"	Sissel Kyrkjebø, Karoline Krüger, Felicity Laurence	Alan Bergman, Marilyn Keith, Norman Luboff	1989	
"You Are My Sunshine"	Sissel Kyrkjebø, Eddie Skoller	Jimmie Davis, Charles Mitchell		
"You and I"	Sissel Kyrkjebø, Göran Fristorp	Tim Rice, Benny Andersson, Björn Ulvaeus	1987	
"You and I"	Sissel Kyrkjebø, Tommy Körberg	Tim Rice, Benny Andersson, Björn Ulvaeus	1989	
"You and I (We Can Conquer the World)"	Sissel Kyrkjebø	Stevie Wonder	2016	
"You Bring the Sun Out"	Sissel Kyrkjebø, Tommy Körberg	Tom Snow, Jessy Dixon	1989	
"You'll Never Walk Alone"	Sissel Kyrkjebø	Oscar Hammerstein II, Richard Rodgers	1990	
"You Raise Me Up"	Sissel Kyrkjebø, Mario Frangoulis	Brendan Graham, Rolf Løvland	2014	
"(Your Love Keeps Lifting Me) Higher and Higher"	Sissel Kyrkjebø	Gary Jackson, Carl Smith	2014	
"You've Got a Friend"	Sissel Kyrkjebø, Sigvart Dagsland	Carole King	1989	
"Ønsk meg hell (Wish Me Luck as You Wave Me Goodbye)"	Sissel Kyrkjebø	Harry Parr-Davies	1985	
"Å gi er å se"	Sissel Kyrkjebø	Erik Hillestad	1990	

== Notes ==
- ^aKyrkjebø was scheduled to record the theme song to James Cameron's 1997 blockbuster film Titanic, but Celine Dion's vocals was preferred due to James Horner's decision to support Dion's career. In an interview from December 2014, Horner quotes: "When I had completed the Titanic [movie], I had to decide for Celine Dion or Sissel['s] [vocals]. Sissel I am very close, while Celine I had known since she was 18, and I had already written three film songs for [her]. But that was before Celine was known and filmmakers and marketing people had not done what they should have done for Celine and [her] songs. So I felt I owed her a Titanic chance, but I could [still] have used Sissel there." Instead, Kyrkjebø completed much of the score for the soundtrack album, Titanic: Music from the Motion Picture. Years later, Horner chose Kyrkjebø to perform "My Heart Will Go On" on both world premieres of Titanic 3D (2012) and Titanic Live (2015).

== See also ==
- Sissel Kyrkjebø discography
