= De beste, 1986–2006 =

Greatest hits album by Sissel Kyrkjebø
- Released: 2006
- Genre: Pop, Crossover, Folk, Operatic pop, Christian

Sissel Kyrkjebø chronology
Into Paradise (2006)	De beste, 1986–2006 (2006)	Northern Lights (2007)

De beste, 1986–2006 is a 2006 Greatest Hits album by Norwegian singer Sissel Kyrkjebø released in Scandinavia. This album contains 2 CDs and several previously unreleased songs.

== Track listing ==
CD 1			
01.	Å Vestland, Vestland		Sissel, 1986
02.	Eg ser		Sissel, 1986
03.	Kjærlighet		Sissel, 1986
04.	Summertime		Sissel, 1986
05.	Se over fjellet		Soria Moria, 1989
06.	Solitaire		Gift Of Love, 1992
07.	Innerst i sjelen		Innerst i sjelen, 1994
08.	Amazing Grace		Soria Moria, 1989
09	Se ilden lyse		Innerst i sjelen, 1994
10.	Tiðin rennur		Innerst i sjelen, 1994
11.	Seterjentens Søndag	with Arve Tellefsen	Soria Moria, 1989
12.	Eg veit i himmerik ei borg		Innerst i sjelen, 1994
13.	Den första gång jag såg dig		Nordisk Vinternatt, 2005
14.	O mio babbino caro		In Symphony, 2001
15.	Sancta Maria		Into Paradise, 2006
16.	Lascia ch'io pianga		My Heart, 2003
17.	Koppången		Nordisk Vinternatt, 2005
18.	Sarah's song		All Good Things, 2000
19.	Adagio		Into Paradise, 2006
20.	Silent Night		previously unreleased

CD 2			
01.	Barndomshjemmet		Syng med oss, 1983
02.	Ung Åslaug		Syng med oss, 1984
03.	Sukyaki		Syng med oss, 1984
04.	En deilig dag		Syng med oss, 1983
05.	Når rosene blomstrer i mormors hage		previously unreleased
06.	If you love me		
07.	Syng kun i din ungdoms vår		previously unreleased
08.	Vilja sangen		previously unreleased
09.	You Don't Bring Me Flowers		previously unreleased
10.	Bergensiana		previously unreleased
11.	Vårvise	with Sebastian	Sissel, 1987
12.	What Are We Made Of	with Brian May	The Adventures of Pinocchio OST, 1996
13.	Prince Igor	with Warren G	The Rapsody Overture (1997)
14.	Mitt hjerte alltid vanker	with The Chieftains	Silent Night: A Christmas in Rome, 1999
15.	Gå inte förbi	with Peter Jöback	Jag kommer hem igen till jul, 2003
16.	Where The Lost Ones Go	with Espen Lind	All Good Things, 2000
17.	Elia Rising	with Sort Sol	Snakecharmer, 2001
18.	Ave Maria	with Bryn Terfel	My Heart, 2004
19.	Bist du bei mir	with Plácido Domingo	Sacred Songs, 2002
20.	My Tribute (To God Be The Glory)	with Oslo Gospel Choir	Julekonserten 10 år, 1999

== Charts ==
=== Weekly charts ===
Chart (2006–2007)	Peak position
Danish Albums (Hitlisten)	4
Norwegian Albums (VG-lista)	3
Swedish Albums (Sverigetopplistan)	3

=== Year-end charts ===
Chart (2006)	Position
Swedish Albums (Sverigetopplistan)	40
