= In Symphony =

Live album by Sissel Kyrkjebø
- Released: 2001

Sissel Kyrkjebø chronology
| All Good Things (2000) | In Symphony (2001) | Sissel (2002) |

In Symphony is a 2001 live concert album by Norwegian singer Sissel Kyrkjebø.

It was recorded during her concerts held in Drammen Theater, Norway in September 2001. Sissel performed her most popular songs and some new songs in a new arrangement with a symphony orchestra. Paddy Moloney, Espen Lind, Kalle Moraeus and Sort Sol guested and performed duets with Sissel on these concerts, which also was broadcast on Norwegian and Swedish television.

In 2005 it was released as a bonus-DVD on Sissel's 2005 album release, Nordisk Vinternatt.

== Track listing ==
=== CD ===
1. Innerst i sjelen
2. Solitaire
3. Våren
4. Å Vestland, Vestland
5. Vitæ Lux
6. Koppången (with Kalle Moraeus on violin)
7. O mio babbino caro
8. Se ilden lyse
9. Kjærlighet
10. Where The Lost Ones Go (duet with Espen Lind)
11. Mitt hjerte alltid vanker
12. Shenandoah (with Paddy Moloney and Kalle Moraeus)
13. Molde Canticle
14. Eg ser
15. Ave Maria (bonus track in Japan)

=== DVD ===
1. Innerst i sjelen
2. Kjærlighet
3. Where The Lost Ones Go (duet with Espen Lind)
4. Weightless
5. Vestland, Vestland
6. Våren
7. O mio babbino caro
8. Ella Rising (with Sort Sol)
9. O sole mio» (with Kalle Moraeus)
10. Shenandoah (with Paddy Moloney and Kalle Moraeus)
11. Eg ser
12. One Day
13. Se ilden lyse

== Charts ==
| Chart (2001) | Peak position |
|---|---|
| Denmark | 3 |
| Norway | 2 |
| Sweden | 11 |
