= List of best-selling albums in Norway =

The following is a list of the best-selling albums in Norway.

== List of albums ==
Year	Artist	Album	Notes	Sales
1987	Sissel Kyrkjebø	Glade Jul	Claimed sales, certification	650,000 - 800,000
1986	Sissel Kyrkjebø	Sissel	Claimed sales	400,000
2009	Sissel Kyrkjebø	Strålande jul	Claimed sales	380,000
1989	Dance with a Stranger	To	Claimed sales	350,000
1997	Shania Twain	Come On Over	Certification	300,000
2010	Kurt Nilsen	Have Yourself a Merry Little Christmas	Certification	270,000
1978	The Smurfs music	1 Smurfeland	Claimed sales	270,000
1989	Åge Aleksandersen	Eldorado	Claimed sales	250,000
1984	Åge Aleksandersen	Leva Livet	Claimed sales	250,000
1996	D.D.E.	Det går likar no	Claimed sales	250,000
1985	The Monroes	Face Another Day	Claimed sales	250,000
1978	Various artists	Grease	Claimed sales, certification	250,000
2006	Kurt Nilsen with Espen Lind, Askil Holm and Alejandro Fuentes	Hallelujah – Live	Claimed sales	240,000
1993	Various Artists	Absolute Music 9	Claimed sales, certification	240,000
1994	Various Artists	Absolute Music 18	Claimed sales, certification	231,000
1985	A-ha	Hunting High and Low	Claimed sales, certification	228,000
1977	ABBA	ABBA: The Album	Claimed sales	210,000
1993	Various Artists	Absolute Music 15	Certification	200,000
1988	Leonard Cohen	I'm Your Man	Certification	200,000
1992	Hanne Boel	Kinda Soul	Claimed sales	200,000
1990	Steinar Albrigtsen	Alone Too Long	Claimed sales	200,000
1977	Smokie	Greatest Hits	Claimed sales	195,000
1993	Trine Rein	Finders, Keepers	Claimed sales	180,000
1977	Various artists	Saturday Night Fever	Claimed sales	180,000
2005	Katie Melua	Piece By Piece	Claimed sales	175,000
1991	Steinar Albrigsten	Alone Too Long	Claimed sales	170,000
1992	ABBA	ABBA Gold	Claimed sales	168,000
1997	Various Artists	Absolute Music 21	Claimed sales	167,000
1982	Bjøro Håland	Bjøro Håland	Claimed sales	160,000
1991	Bonnie Tyler	Bitterblue	Claimed sales, certification	155,000

== See also ==
- List of best-selling albums
  - List of best-selling albums by country
