= My Heart (Sissel album) =

2003 studio album by Sissel Kyrkjebø

Studio album by Sissel Kyrkjebø
- Released: 2003
- Genres: Classical, Crossover, Christian

Sissel Kyrkjebø chronology
| Sissel (2002) | My Heart (2003) | Nordisk Vinternatt (2005) |

My Heart

Studio album by Sissel Kyrkjebø
- Released: 2004
- Genres: Classical, Crossover, Christian

My Heart is the eighth studio album by Norwegian singer Sissel Kyrkjebø released in Norway. In 2004 a new version was released in the US and Japan with several new songs.

== Track listing ==
=== Norway release ===
1. Romance
2. Lascia Che Io Pianga
3. Mon cœur s'ouvre à ta voix
4. Wait A While
5. Tristezze
6. Hymne
7. Ich hatte viel Bekümmerniss
8. Oblivion
9. Pie Jesu
10. The Sleeping Princess
11. Deborah's Theme

=== US and Japan release ===
1. Wait A While
2. Lascia ch'io pianga
3. Someone Like You
4. Tristezza
5. Angel Rays
6. Mon cœur s'ouvre à ta voix
7. Pie Jesu
8. Oblivion
9. You Raise Me Up
10. O Mio Babbino Caro
11. Ave Maria
12. Deborah's Theme (from Once Upon A Time In America)

== Charts ==
=== Weekly charts ===
| Chart (2003) | Peak position |
|---|---|
| Danish Albums (Hitlisten) | 7 |
| Norwegian Albums (VG-lista) | 2 |
| Swedish Albums (Sverigetopplistan) | 2 |

=== Year-end charts ===
| Chart (2003) | Position |
|---|---|
| Swedish Albums (Sverigetopplistan) | 48 |
