= Northern Lights (Sissel album) =

2007 album by Norwegian performer Sissel

Live album by Sissel Kyrkjebø
- Released: 6 November 2007
- Genre: Pop, Crossover, Folk, Operatic pop, Christian

Sissel Kyrkjebø chronology
De beste, 1986–2006 (2006)	Northern Lights (2007)	Strålande jul (2009)

Northern Lights is a 2007 live album and DVD released in the US by Norwegian singer Sissel Kyrkjebø.

The CD and DVD is a live recording of a concert at Bergstadens Ziir ("Jewel of the mountain town" in German), a church from the 17th century in Røros, Norway (a 17th-century Germany mining town). It was inspired by Norway's winter, the Blue Hour, and the mystical Northern Lights.

The music was arranged by Kjetil Bjerkestrand. The musicians sharing the stage with Sissel were the Trondheim Soloists, the Nidaros Cathedral Girls Choir, and Sissel's own band. The concert featured the tenor José Carreras, which performed the Julio Iglesias/Dolly Parton-duet "When You Tell Me That You Love Me" with Sissel.

Northern Lights reached #10 in the Billboard Classical Crossover album list.

== Track listing ==
=== CD ===
1. Hallowed Mountains
2. Hymn To Winter
3. Jesu, Joy of Man's Desiring
4. Koppången
5. Sarah's Song
6. Your Sky
7. When Will My Heart Arise
8. Icelandic Lullaby
9. Ready To Go Home
10. Quando Sento Che Mi Ami (duet with José Carreras)
11. God Rest Ye Merry, Gentlemen
12. Going Home

=== DVD ===
1. Hallowed Mountains
2. Hymn To Winter
3. Jesu, Joy of Man's Desiring
4. Sarah's Song
5. Mitt hjerte alltid vanker
6. Ave Maris Stella
7. Like an Angel Passing Through My Room
8. Der er ingenting i verden så stille som sne
9. Amore Perduto José Carreras
10. Quando Sento Che Mi Ami (duet with José Carreras)
11. In the Bleak Midwinter
12. God Rest Ye Merry, Gentlemen
13. Your Sky
14. Ready To Go Home
15. Going Home

Bonus Tracks:

1. Om kvelden
2. Now the Day is Over (Jeg ved en lærkerede)
