= Into Paradise (Sissel album) =

Studio album by Sissel Kyrkjebø
- Released: February 14, 2006
- Genre: Classical, crossover, operatic pop, Christian

Sissel Kyrkjebø chronology
Nordisk Vinternatt (2005)	Into Paradise (2006)	De beste, 1986–2006 (2006)

Into Paradise is a 2006 classical/crossover album by Norwegian soprano Sissel Kyrkjebø released in the US, the UK and Japan.

== Track listing ==
=== UK version ===
1. In Paradisum
2. Sancta Maria
3. Bachianas Brasileiras
4. Dido's Lament
5. Wachet auf, ruft uns die Stimme
6. Dusk (Velkomne med æra)
7. Ingen vinner frem
8. What Child Is This?
9. Marble Halls
10. The Sleeping Princess
11. Vitae Lux
12. Salley Gardens
13. Ave Verum Corpus
14. Like an Angel Passing Through My Room

=== US version ===
1. Dusk
2. Bachianas Brasileiras
3. Wachet auf, ruft uns die Stimme
4. Dido's Lament
5. In Paradisum
6. Sancta Maria
7. Vitae Lux
8. Ingen vinner frem
9. Bäreden väg för herran
10. Marble Halls
11. Adagio
12. Like an Angel Passing Through My Room

=== Japan version ===
1. In Paradisum
2. Sancta Maria
3. Bachianas Brasileiras
4. Dido's Lament
5. Wachet auf, ruft uns die Stimme
6. Dusk (Velkomne med æra)
7. Ingen vinner frem
8. What Child Is This?
9. Marble Halls
10. The Sleeping Princess
11. Vitae Lux
12. Salley Gardens
13. Ave Verum Corpus
14. Like an Angel Passing Through My Room
15. Adagio (Bonus track)
