= Reflections (Sissel Kyrkjebø album) =

Studio album by Sissel Kyrkjebø
- Released: 2019
- Genre: Folk; pop; traditional pop

Sissel Kyrkjebø chronology
Til deg (2010)	Reflections (2019)

Reflections is a 2019 project from the Norwegian singer Sissel Kyrkjebø. As a part of turning 50 years in 2019, Sissel will release one new song once a week for the following 50 weeks. The songs are released on her own website, sisselmusic.com followed by a music video on her official YouTube channel. On May 26, she released the first song of the project, "Unchained Melody".

The project started in Oslo in 2015. Sissel started listening to love songs, because she wanted to find different happy love songs. She listened to songs from the early 1920s and all the way up to today. After choosing her favourites, Sissel discovered that she had also chosen songs that not always was that happy. As Sissel stated on her website, introducing her project: "There is songs about longing, songs about love, songs about being in love. Songs about sadness, happiness and being cheated. And songs about joy and that's how Reflections came about."

When visiting the Norwegian TV-show, Lindmo in August 2019, Sissel told about this project: "It is my wish to invite my audience into my musical world. Not into my personal life, but into my musical universe. Then it is not enough with just one song. I also have to release a music video and a video where I explain my choice, my thoughts around it and fun facts, so people can get behind the song."

In 2016, Sissel contacted drummer and producer Bill Maxwell, who she had been working with on the 1989 album, Soria Moria. He introduced her to several musicians, like the two pianists Bill Cantos and Tim Carmon, who plays the piano and has arranged many of the songs on Reflections. All the songs on the album has been released before by other artists, but there is one exception. "After All" originally was an unrecorded instrumental piece, written by Bill Maxwell and Abraham Laboriel. After Sissel heard it and loved it, Maxwell wrote lyrics for the song. So far, the project has been released in five parts, Reflections I, Reflections II, Reflections III, Reflections IV and Reflections V. There are ten songs in each part, except for Reflections II, that contains 11 songs.

== Track listing ==
=== Reflections I ===
1. "Unchained Melody"
2. "My Foolish Heart"
3. "For the Good Times"
4. "Lord Protect My Child"
5. "Have I Told You Lately"
6. "Out of Left Field"
7. "Who Knows Where the Time Goes?"
8. "I'm a Fool"
9. "Ebb Tide"
10. "Go Leave"

=== Reflections II ===
1. "Welcome to My World"
2. "The First Time Ever I Saw Your Face"
3. "Surrender"
4. "Slow Down"
5. "The Masquerade Is Over"
6. "The Man I Love"
7. "In My Life"
8. "Goodbye"
9. "September Song"
10. "After All"
11. "Born to Be Loved"

=== Reflections III ===
1. "If I Can Dream"
2. "You Were Always on My Mind"
3. "Crying in the Chapel"
4. "Three Times a Lady"
5. "If I Can Help Somebody"
6. "Let it Snow"
7. "When You Wish Upon a Star"
8. "Make Me a Present of You"
9. "River"
10. "In the Night of New Year's Eve"

=== Reflections IV ===
1. "My Romance"
2. "Till the End of Time"
3. "When a Man Loves a Woman"
4. "A Time to Love, a Time to Cry"
5. "The Very Thought of You"
6. "If You Go Away"
7. "In the Wee Small Hours of the Morning"
8. "I'll Never Fall in Love Again"
9. "I Don't Know How to Love Him"
10. "I Wish I Knew How It Would Feel to Be Free"

=== Reflections V ===
1. "Didn't We"
2. "I Will Wait For You"
3. "Walk away|"
4. "Up to the Mountain"
5. "He Ain't Heavy, He's My Brother:
6. "We'll Meet Again"
7. "Don't Let Me Be Lonely Tonight"
8. "When I Fall in Love"
9. "God Bless the Child"
10. "What a Wonderful World"
