= Sissel (1986 album) =

Studio album by Sissel Kyrkjebø
- Released: 1986
- Genre: Pop

Sissel Kyrkjebø chronology
Sissel (1986)	Glade Jul (1987)

Sissel is the debut studio album from Norwegian singer Sissel Kyrkjebø, released in 1986 which contained different genres and styles. According to her, "....The songs tell different facets of love." It was sold more than 400,000 copies soon after the release, making it the best selling album in Norway at that time, in a country with a population of 4.16 million (in 1986).

== Charts ==
Chart (1986)	Peak position
Norwegian Albums Chart	1

== Track listing ==
=== Norway version ===
01. Kjærlighet
02. Tenn et lys for dem
03. Jeg trenger deg
04. Summertime
05. I ditt smil
06. Eg ser
07. Å Vestland, Vestland
08. Vil du vekke tonen min?
09. Inn til deg
10. Frøet
11. Det skal lyse en sol
12. Dagen gryr

=== Sweden version ===
01. Kärleken
02. Har en dröm
03. Vem
04. Tänd ett ljus
05. In till dig
06. Jag ser
07. Det skall lysa en sol
08. Summertime
09. Å Vestland, Vestland
10. Låt mej vara nära dej
11. Dagen gryr

=== Denmark version ===
01. Vårvise (duet with Sebastian)
02. Har en dröm
03. Summertime
04. Kärleken
05. I ditt smil
06. Jag ser
07. Inn til deg
08. Vil du vekke tonen min?
09. Å Vestland, Vestland
10. Rosen
11. Det skall lysa en sol
12. Dagen gryr
