= Nordisk Vinternatt =

Studio album by Sissel Kyrkjebø
- Released: 2005
- Genres: Folk, Traditional, Christian

Sissel Kyrkjebø chronology
My Heart (2004)	Nordisk Vinternatt (2005)	Into Paradise (2006)

Nordisk Vinternatt is the ninth studio album by Norwegian singer Sissel Kyrkjebø released in Scandinavia. This album includes folk- and traditional songs in Norwegian, Swedish, Danish and Icelandic.

== Track listing ==
1. Denti, du Astri (Norwegian)
2. Vårvinder friska (Swedish)
3. O tysta ensamhet (Swedish)
4. Det er ingenting i verden så stille som sne (Danish)
5. Om kvelden (Norwegian)
6. Du är den ende (Swedish)
7. Jeg lagde meg så silde (Norwegian)
8. Bereden väg för Herran (Swedish)
9. Musens sang (Danish)
10. Den första gång jag såg dig (Swedish)
11. Bruremarsj (Norwegian)
12. Koppången (Swedish)
13. Sofðu ungá astín min (Icelandic)

== Critical reception ==
Norwegian newspaper Vårt Land wrote: "Sissel sings better and better. She has found beautiful melodies from Nordic songbooks and sings them with a call that is no longer dominated by her glorious extroversion".
