= Sancta Maria (song) =

Song adapted from Mascagni's opera Cavlleria rusticana

"Sancta Maria" is a Latin-language aria arranged by Steven Mercurio based on the intermezzo from Pietro Mascagni's 1890 opera Cavalleria rusticana. It uses some of the lyrics from the Marian prayer Ave Maria and has become a popular concert piece. It has been recorded by several singers, e.g. sopranos Sissel Kyrkjebø, Charlotte Church, mezzo-soprano Katherine Jenkins, tenors Andrea Bocelli and Friar Alessandro.

== Text ==
Ave Maria,
gratia plena,
Dominus tecum,
benedicta, benedicta tu in mulieribus,
et benedictus
fructus ventris tui, Jesus.

Sancta Maria,
Mater Dei,
ora pro nobis peccatoribus,
nunc et in hora mortis nostrae.
Amen.

Hail Mary,
full of grace,
the Lord is with you,
blessed, blessed you are, amongst women,
and blessed is
the fruit of thy womb, Jesus.

Sancta Maria,
Mother of God,
pray for us sinners,
now and at the hour of our death.
Amen.

== Recordings ==
- Andrea Bocelli, on the album Sacred Arias (1999)
- Charlotte Church, on the album Prelude: The Best of Charlotte Church (2002)
- Keedie Babb, on the album I Believe My Heart (2004)
- Sissel Kyrkjebø, on the album Into Paradise (2006)
- All Angels, on the album All Angels (2006)
- Katherine Jenkins, on the album Rejoice (2007)
- Blake, on the album And So It Goes (2008)
- Patricia Janečková, on the album Patricia Janečková (2011)
- Friar Alessandro, on the album Voice from Assisi (2012)
- Tarja Turunen, on the album Ave Maria – En Plein Air (2015)
- Amira Willighagen, on the album Merry Christmas (2015)
