= Sissel (2002 album) =

Studio album by Sissel Kyrkjebø
- Released: October 1, 2002
- Genres: Pop, Folk, Crossover

Sissel Kyrkjebø chronology
In Symphony (2001)	Sissel (2002)	My Heart (2003)

Sissel is the self-titled seventh studio album by Norwegian singer Sissel Kyrkjebø released in the US. This is also her first release made for the US market.

In the finale of the fifth episode (of Season 3) of American television political drama series The Newsroom, which aired in December 2014, Shenandoah from Sissel was used.

== Track listing ==
1. Sarah's Song (4:26)
2. Can't Go Back (3:51)
3. Keep Falling Down (5:05)
4. Shenandoah (3:58)
5. All Good Things (5:00)
6. We Both Know (3:25)
7. Carrier Of A Secret (4:07)
8. Solitaire (3:32)
9. Should It Matter (4:51)
10. Lær meg å kjenne (3:36)
11. Weightless (4:50)
12. Molde Canticle (3:26)
