= Stig Nilsson =

Swedish footballer

Personal information
- Full name: Stig Nilsson
- Date of birth: 28 July 1931
- Date of death: 27 May 2008 (aged 76)
- Position: Forward

Senior career*
Years	Team	Apps	(Gls)
1950–1951	Malmö FF	3	(0)
- * Club domestic league appearances and goals

Stig Nilsson (1931–2008) was a Swedish footballer who played as a forward.
