= Soria Moria =

Studio album by Sissel Kyrkjebø
- Released: 1989
- Genre: Pop
- Label: Noah's Ark
- Producer: Svein Gunderson

Sissel Kyrkjebø chronology
Glade Jul (1987)	Soria Moria (1989)	Gift of Love (1992)

Soria Moria is the third studio album by the Norwegian singer Sissel Kyrkjebø, named after the fairy tale Soria Moria Castle.

== Track listing ==
1. Se over fjellet
2. Pokarekare Ana
3. Amazing Grace
4. Blod i brann
5. Gi meg ikke din styrke
6. Liliana
7. Soria Moria
8. Sommerdrøm
9. Seterjentens søndag
10. Slummens datter
11. Alle have består av dråper
12. Grenseløs
13. Veien er ditt mål
14. Somewhere

== Charts ==
Chart (1989)	Peak position
Norway Album Chart	1
