= Jan Vincents Johannessen =

Norwegian physician and hospital manager

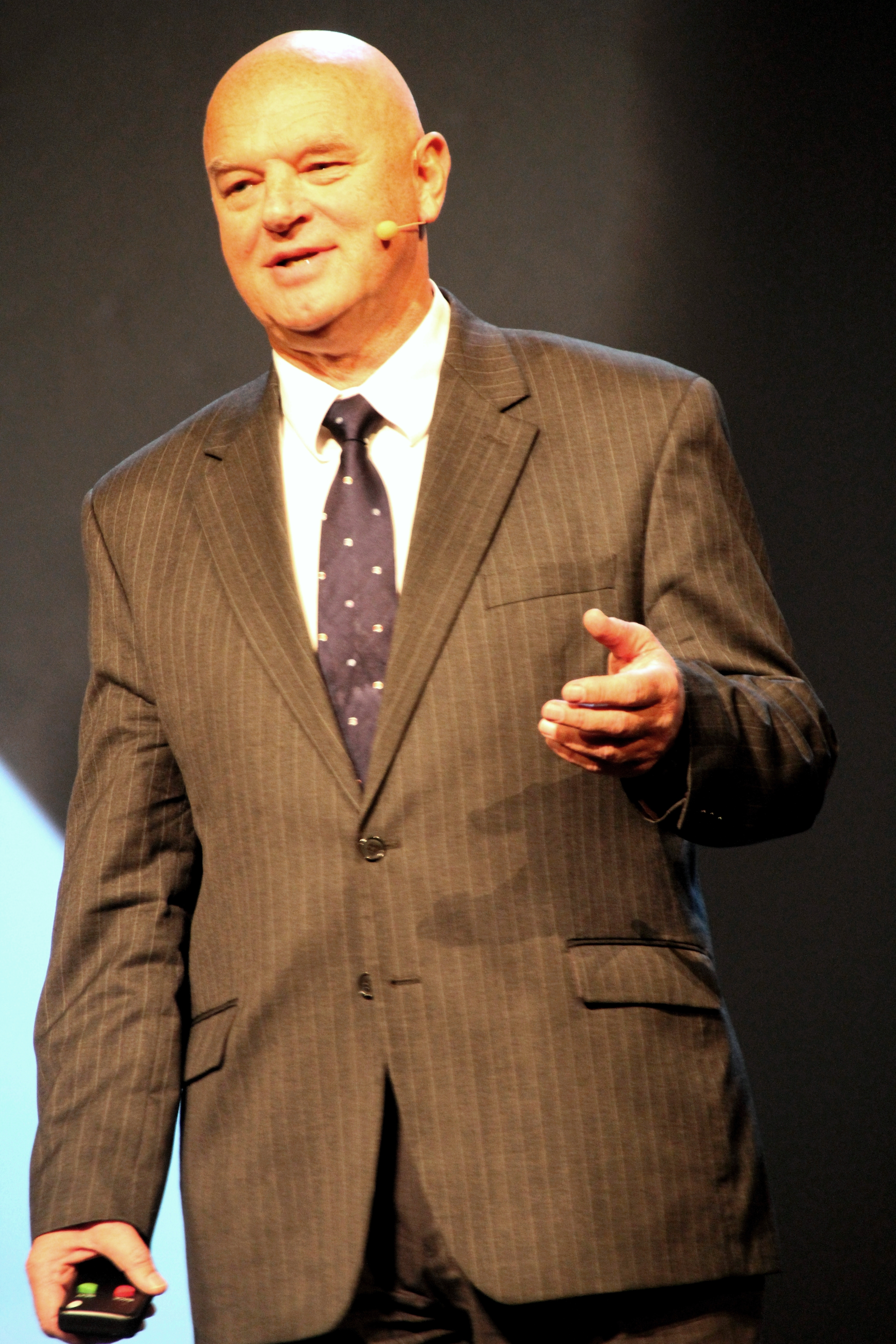
- Born: 25 May 1941 (age 84); Kristiansand, Reichskommissariat Norwegen (today Norway)
- Occupations: Physician, cancer researcher, hospital manager
- Employer: Norwegian Radium Hospital

Jan Vincents Johannessen (born 25 May 1941) is a Norwegian physician, cancer researcher, hospital director, painter, text writer and composer.

He was born in Kristiansand. He is known for his research on cancer, and has published books on diagnostics by the use of electron microscopy. He has served as manager of the Norwegian Radium Hospital. He was decorated Commander of the Order of St. Olav in 1994. He is a fellow of the Norwegian Academy of Technological Sciences.
