= Taro Ichihara =

Japanese opera singer (born 1950)

- Born: January 1, 1950; Japan Sakata, Yamagata
- Other name: 市原 多朗
- Occupation: opera singer (tenor)

Taro Ichihara (市原 多朗, Ichihara Tarō) (born 1950) is a Japanese opera singer, who sings as a tenor, primarily in Verdi roles.

== Biography ==
He was born in the city of Sakata in Yamagata Prefecture, Japan, and studied music at the Tokyo National University of Fine Arts and Music. He also studied in Italy at the Accademia Chigiana in Siena and the Accademia di Santa Cecilia in Rome. He made his professional operatic debut in 1980 in the title role of Werther. In the early 1980s he sang in Europe, including in São Carlos National Theatre in Lisbon and at the Salzburg Festival.

He sang at the Metropolitan Opera, debuting there on October 30, 1986 in the role of the Italian tenor in Der Rosenkavalier. Other roles with the Metropolitan Opera have included the Duke of Mantua in Rigoletto, Edgardo in Lucia di Lammermoor, and Riccardo in Un ballo in maschera, and concert performances as Cavaradossi in Tosca. He has also performed in Un ballo in maschera as well as singing the role of Macduff in Macbeth with the Opéra National de Paris. He sang the role of Alfredo in La traviata with Fujiwara Opera. Other operatic roles have included Ismaele in Nabucco and Rodolfo in La bohème. He has also sung with the New York Philharmonic in Verdi's Messa da Requiem, and recorded the piece with the Osaka Philharmonic. A performance of his, as Rodolfo opposite June Anderson in the title role in an Opéra de Lyon performance of Luisa Miller, has been released on DVD.

He was profiled as one of Japan's bright talents in the video Japan as It Is, produced by the Consulate General of Japan in 1994.
