= Tore Ørjasæter =

Norwegian educator and poet (1886–1968)

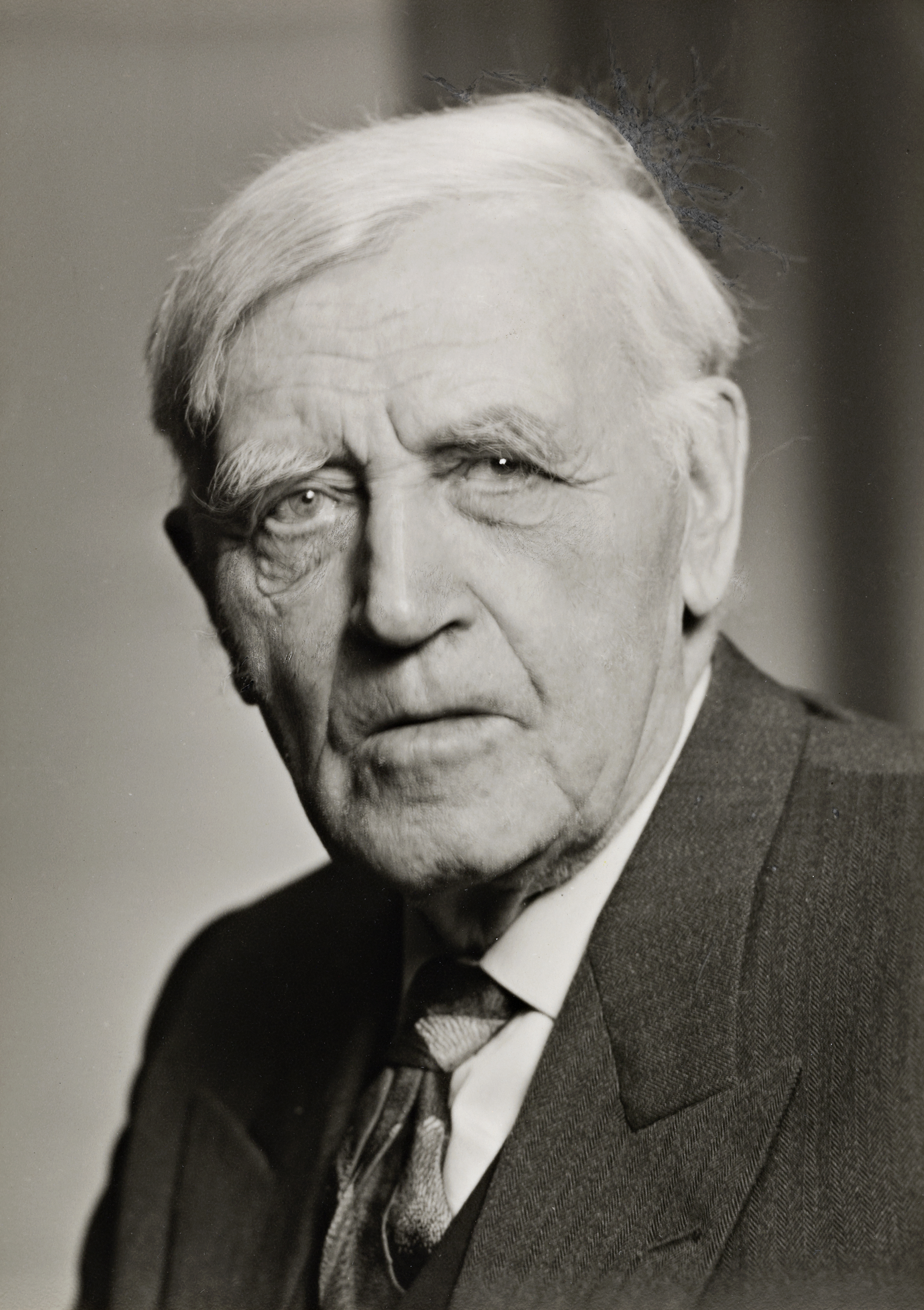
Ørjasæter in 1961

Tore Ørjasæter (3 March 1886 – 29 February 1968) was a Norwegian educator and poet.

== Biography ==
Ørjasæter was born at Skiaker Municipality (later spelled Skjåk) in Christians amt (county), Norway. The son of a teacher, he attended Voss folk high school and qualified as a teacher before becoming a writer.

Ørjasæter's poetry was written in Nynorsk in the Norwegian folk tradition. His writing is influenced by Ivar Aasen, Aasmund Olavsson Vinje and Per Sivle. Like these, he was concerned with modernization of traditional society, and the conflict between individual and community, but he differed from these poets in a more positive attitude to the new society. Towards the end of his life, he also started experimenting with more modernist writing. His main work is considered to be the poem Gudbrand Langleite.

== Personal life ==
Ørjasæter was married in 1921 to Aaslaug Skaaden (1896–1988). He then became the father of literary critic Jo Ørjasæter (1925–2006) and the father-in-law of professor Tordis Ørjasæter.

== Works ==
- 1908 - Ættar-arv (Ancestor-heritage) – poetry
- 1910 - I dalom (In the valleys) – poetry
- 1913 - Gudbrand Langleite – trilogy, first part
- 1915 - Manns kvæde (Man's chanting) – poetry
- 1920 - Bru-millom (Between bridges) – trilogy, second part
- 1925 - Skiringsgangen (The cleansing walk)
- 1927 - Skuggen (The shadow) – trilogy, third part
- 1932 - Elvesong (River song) – poetry
- 1945 - Livsens tre (The tree of life) – poetry
- 1948 - Christophoros – play
- 1949 - Den lange bryllupsreisa (The long honeymoon) – play

== Awards ==
- Statens kunstnerlønn from 1929
- Gyldendal's Endowment 1946
- Dobloug Prize 1952
- Gudbrandsdal's culture prize of 1957
- Melsom-prisen 1968

== See also ==
- Å, Vestland, Vestland, a Norwegian popular song with lyrics by Ørjasæter
