= In paradisum =

Component of Catholic requiem mass

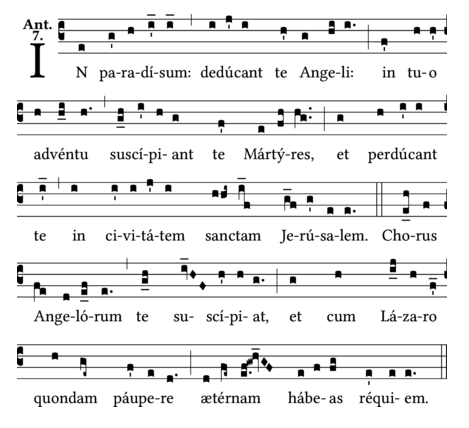
The antiphon In paradisum

"In paradisum" (English: "Into paradise") is an antiphon from the traditional Latin liturgy of the Western Church Requiem Mass. It is sung by the choir as the body is being taken out of the church. The text of the In paradisum — with or without the Gregorian melody itself — is sometimes included in musical settings of the Requiem Mass, such as those by Gabriel Fauré and by Maurice Duruflé.

== Text ==
In paradisum deducant te angeli; in tuo adventu suscipiant te martyres, et perducant te in civitatem sanctam Jerusalem. Chorus angelorum te suscipiat, et cum Lazaro quondam paupere æternam habeas requiem.

"May the angels lead you into paradise; may the martyrs receive you at your arrival and lead you to the holy city Jerusalem. May choirs of angels receive you and with Lazarus, once (a) poor (man), may you have eternal rest."

The melody of In paradisum

In the Masses for the dead, this antiphon is sung in procession on the way from the final blessing of the corpse in church to the graveyard where burial takes place. The Gregorian melody for In paradisum is in the Mixolydian mode. The special nature of this mode — with its lowered seventh degree, which makes it different from the modern major mode — is heard twice in this melody at cadences on the words Chorus Angelorum and quondam paupere. The melodic highpoint in this setting comes on the name of Lazarus, the poor beggar in Luke's Gospel.

== Modern variations ==
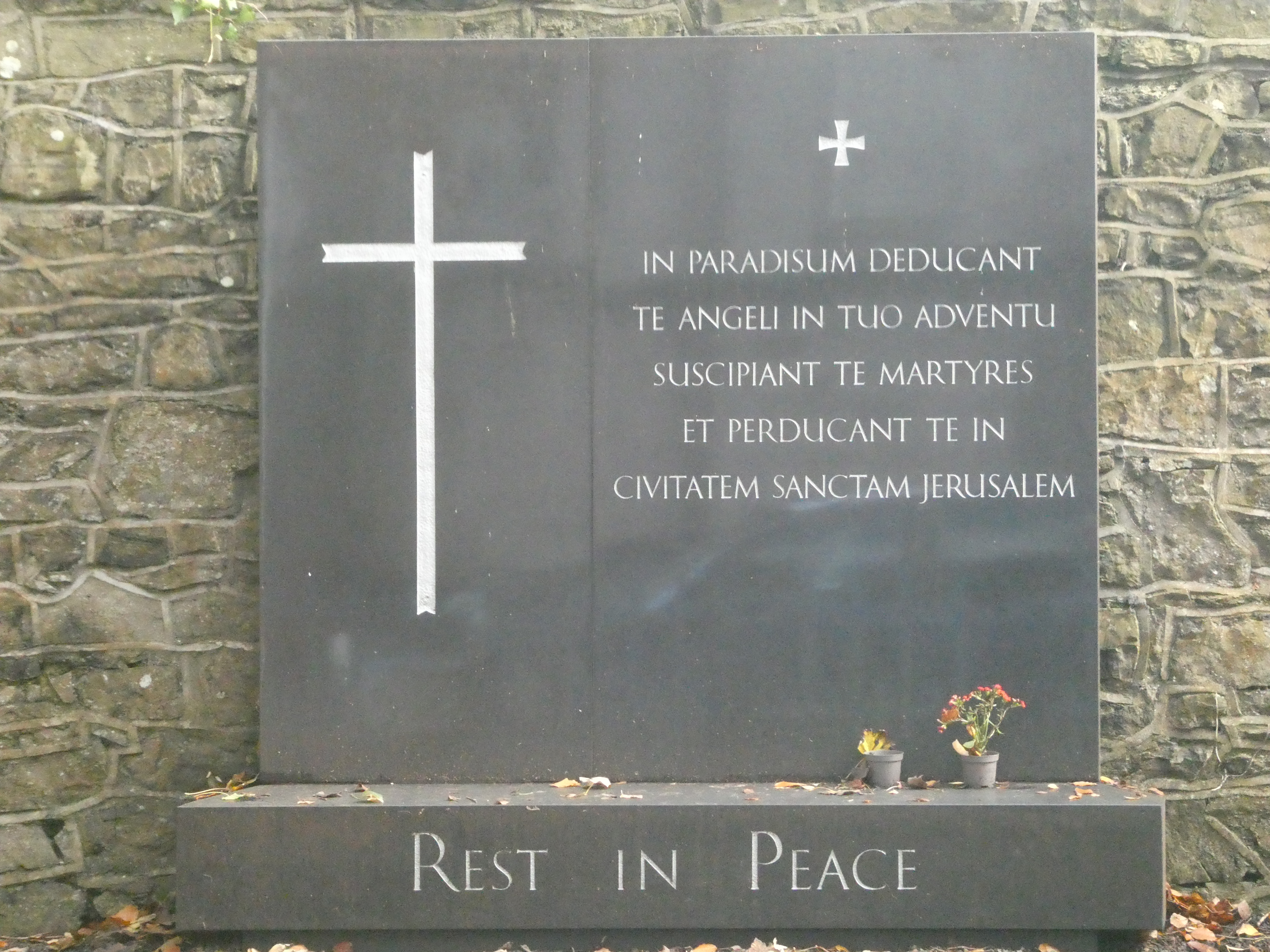
The text on a grave in Sligo, Ireland

There are many contemporary English settings of the text offered by Catholic publishers including Oregon Catholic Press. Bob Dufford wrote a version called "Songs of the Angels". James Quinn also wrote a version titled "May Flights of Angels Lead You On Your Way", accompanied by Unde et Memores. Others include settings by Grayson Warren Brown, Ernest Sands, and others.

In Paradisum may have served as the inspiration for "When the Saints Go Marching In", which shares the same first four notes, similar textual meaning, and use during the funeral procession of the body from the church to the cemetery in Black Protestant churches.

== See also ==
- Requiem
- Libera Me
