= Glade Jul =

Studio album by Sissel Kyrkjebø
- Released: 1 Jan 1987
- Genres: Folk, Christian
- Label: Universal
- Producer: Svein Dag Hauge

Sissel Kyrkjebø chronology
Sissel (1986)	Glade Jul (1987)	Soria Moria (1989)

Glade Jul is the second studio album by the Norwegian singer Sissel Kyrkjebø. The album was recorded with the Bergen Philharmonic Orchestra. It sold 450,000 copies in 1987 and has sold over 60,000 copies in Norway since then. Adding the releases in other countries, the sales number has passed the one million mark since then. The album was mainly sold in Norway, whose population is less than five million. Glade Jul is the all-time best-selling album in Norway.

== Track listing ==
1. "Glade Jul"
2. "O Helga Natt"
3. "Nå Tennes Tusen Julelys"
4. "Det Hev Ei Rose Sprunge"
5. "Det Lyser i Stille Grender"
6. "Deilig Er Jorden"
7. "Julepotpurri: Et Barn Er Født I Bethlehem / Her Kommer Dine Arme Små / Det Kimer Nå Til Julefest / Jeg Synger Julekvad"
8. "Mary's Boy child"
9. "Jeg Er Så Glad Hver Julekveld"
10. "Den Store Stjerna"

== Sweden release ==
Stilla Natt is the Swedish version of the Norwegian Christmas release Glade Jul from the same year, with some songs sung in Swedish instead of Norwegian.

=== Track listing ===
1. "Stilla natt"
2. "O helga natt"
3. "Nu tändas tusen juleljus"
4. "Det hev ei rose sprunge"
5. "Det lyser i stille grender"
6. "Deilig er jorden"
7. "Julepotpurri" - "Et barn er født i Betlehem"/"Her kommer dine arme små"/"Det kimer nå til julefest"/"Jeg synger julekvad"
8. "Mary's Boy Child"
9. "Jag er så glad hver julekveld"
10. "Den stora stjerna"

== Charts ==
Chart (1987)	Peak position
Norway Albums Chart	1

== Certifications ==
Region	Certification	Certified units/sales
Norway (IFPI Norway)	4× Platinum	800,000
