= Strålande jul =

Studio album by Sissel & Odd
- Released: 2009
- Recorded: 2009
- Genres: Christmas, Traditional, Folk
- Label: Universal Records

Sissel & Odd chronology
Northern Lights (2007)	Strålande jul (2009)	Til deg (2010)

Strålande jul (Glorious Christmas) is a 2009 joint album by Sissel Kyrkjebø and Odd Nordstoga credited as the duo Sissel & Odd (or Sissel og Odd as on the album cover). They are the only Norwegian artists to have an album go 11 times platinum with the album sales of Strålande jul.

== Track list ==
1. "Upp gledjest alle, gledjest no"
2. "Den fagraste rosa"
3. "Jul, jul, strålande jul"
4. "Det lyser i stille grender"
5. "Jag vill alltid följa dig"
6. "I en steingrå vinter"
7. "Jul i svingen"
8. "Velkommen igen"
9. "Maria hun er en jomfru ren"
10. "Mot den nya världen"
11. "No høyr, de gode folk"

== Charts ==
The album stayed 7 weeks at the top of VG-lista, the official Norwegian Albums Chart. The single taken from the album also reached #11 in the Norwegian Singles Chart.

== Critical reception ==
Lasse Sørnes from Finnmark Dagblad called the album "Norwegian Christmas at its best". He wrote: "National-treasures Sissel and Odd Nordstoga together on an album is the epitome of a true Norwegian product, and what could be better than the songbirds making a Christmas album together." The song "Upp gledjest alle, gledjest no" was noted as the best song.

== Charts ==
=== Weekly charts ===
Chart (2009–2019)	Peak position
Norwegian Albums (VG-lista)	1
Swedish Albums (Sverigetopplistan)	7

=== Year-end charts ===
Chart (2009)	Position
Swedish Albums (Sverigetopplistan)	54

== Certifications and sales ==
Region	Certification	Certified units/sales
Norway	—	380,000
Sweden (GLF)	Gold	20,000^{^}
^{^} Shipments figures based on certification alone.
