= Til deg =

Studio album by Sissel Kyrkjebø
- Released: 15 November 2010
- Genre: Folk, Roots, Country

Sissel Kyrkjebø chronology
Strålande jul (2009)	Til deg (2010)

Til deg is a 2010 folk/roots/country album by Norwegian singer Sissel Kyrkjebø, which was released in Scandinavia. This album includes songs in Norwegian, Swedish and English.

The album was released on 15 November 2010 in Scandinavia. It was recorded in ABBA's Polar Studios in Stockholm, Nidaros Studios in Trondheim, and in Nashville. This album shows a new direction in music and is heavily influenced by the style of country music, roots and folk. The album includes five songs sung in Swedish, three in Norwegian and two in English, including a Norwegian translation of Victoria Shaw's song "Never Alone", titled "Velkommen hjem", and a Swedish cover of Alison Krauss' song "Ghost in This House", called "Levande död". Sissel has collaborated with Mikael Wiehe, Espen Lind, and Py Bäckman on the new album.

== Composition ==
=== Songs ===
The lead-song of this album is "Velkommen hjem" (Welcome Home), a Norwegian translation of Victoria Shaw's "Never Alone". It's a country-influenced ballad and was translated by the Norwegian musician Guren Hagen. Sissel asked him to write the lyrics in Norwegian to the melody of "Never Alone". This song was a big hit on Norwegian radio and has been performed by Sissel on several occasions. Sissel performed "Velkommen hjem" as a duet with Swedish singer Carola on the Norwegian/Swedish talkshow Skavlan in November 2010 and later in December as a duet with Danish singer Poul Krebs on the Danish Christmas TV-concert DR's store juleshow.

Odd Nordstoga has arranged two songs on this album: his own song "Dagane" and "Folkestadvisa", an old Norwegian folksong from Bø in Telemark, Norway.

== Critical reception ==
Til deg received both positive reviews and some less positive reviews from music critics. Thomas Talseth in VG gave it 3 out of 6. The last song, "Goodbye" was noted the best song on the album. Signe Bønsvig Wehding from GAFFA gave it 3 stars out of 6 stars. She wrote: ""Tatt intill deg" has a little jazz, "Levanda død" a little pain, and are the album's best tracks. The accompaniment is turned down to "normal" band size with keys, guitar, bass and percussion/drums, and it suits Sissel, who can snuggle in all kinds of musical clothes." Fredrik Wandrup from Dagbladet criticized the album for its lack of a unifying idea and gave it 3 out of 6. He wrote: "On the whole, the album is threatened by a certain lack of commitment." The songs "Velkommen hjem", "Tätt inntil dig" and "Dagane" was noted as the best songs of this album.

== Track listing ==
1. "Velkommen hjem"
2. "Tätt intill dig"
3. "Saknar dig nu"
4. "Folkestadvisa"
5. "Den första sommaren"
6. "Hole In The World"
7. "Levande död"
8. "En dröm om dig och mig"
9. "Dagane"
10. "Goodbye"
