= Only Love (Nana Mouskouri song) =

1984 single by Nana Mouskouri

Single by Nana Mouskouri
- Released: 1984
- Length: 4:21
- Label: Carrere, Philips
- Songwriters: Vladimir Cosma, Norman Gimbel
- Producer: André Chapelle

"Only Love" is a song by Greek singer Nana Mouskouri. It is the theme song to the American TV series Mistral's Daughter, based upon the novel by Judith Krantz. When released as a single, it reached number two on the UK Singles Chart in early 1986 and peaked atop the charts of Belgium, Ireland and the Netherlands.

The song was also a hit in its other versions: "L'Amour en Héritage" (French), "Come un'eredità" (Italian), "La dicha del amor" (Spanish), and "Aber die Liebe bleibt" (German). The German version was also recorded with an alternate set of lyrics under the title "Der wilde Wein" but was withdrawn in favour of "Aber die Liebe bleibt".

== Charts ==
=== Weekly charts ===
| Chart (1985–1986) | Peak position |
|---|---|
| Belgium (Ultratop 50 Flanders) | 1 |
| Canada Adult Contemporary (RPM) | 24 |
| Europe (European Hot 100 Singles) | 34 |
| Finland (Suomen virallinen lista) | 4 |
| Ireland (IRMA) | 1 |
| Netherlands (Dutch Top 40) | 1 |
| Netherlands (Single Top 100) | 1 |
| Sweden (Sverigetopplistan) | 4 |
| UK Singles (Official Charts) | 2 |

=== Year-end charts ===
| Chart (1985) | Position |
|---|---|
| Belgium (Ultratop) | 8 |
| Netherlands (Dutch Top 40) | 29 |
| Netherlands (Single Top 100) | 5 |

| Chart (1986) | Position |
|---|---|
| UK Singles (OCC) | 54 |

== Sissel Kyrkjebø version ==
Norwegian soprano Sissel Kyrkjebø covered this song in Norwegian, titled "Kjærlighet" (Love), for her 1986 album Sissel and in Swedish for the Sweden-release of the album in 1987.
