= Koppången (song) =

Song composed by Per-Erik Moraeus

Koppången is a Swedish song, with music composed originally for violin in 1998 by Per-Erik Moraeus for his folk music group Orsa Spelmän, which includes his brothers Kalle Moraeus and Olle Moraeus. The name and the inspiration for the song come from the wetlands and nature preserve Koppången, near the Moraeus family home in Orsa Municipality, Dalarna, Sweden.

In 1998 Orsa Spelmän recorded the instrumental version of Koppången on the album Ödra which was released on the label Mono Music (MMCD 013).

In 1999 Py Bäckman wrote lyrics for the song, in both Swedish and English and mezzo-soprano Anne Sofie von Otter recorded both versions on her album, 'Home for Christmas', which was released by Deutsche Grammophon.

The lyrics of Py Bäckman describe a country church in a winter scene at Christmas time. Pernilla Eskilsdotter, music host on Sveriges Radio P2 comments: "Det är ofta svårt för nya jullåtar att etablera sig och bli klassiker. En som har lyckats med det är Koppången." ("It is often difficult for new Christmas songs to establish themselves and become classics. One which has succeeded with that is Koppången.")

In the Yle Vega Swedish language series about Christmas songs, music editor Bertil Blom writes:

Spelmanslåten Koppången har blivit en modern julklassiker. Den som först sjöng den var Anne Sofie von Otter. Efter henne har Helen Sjöholm och många andra spelat in den. I dag är den så vanlig att man knappt kan gå på en advents- eller julkonsert utan att höra den.
The folk music tune Koppången has become a modern Christmas classic. The first to sing it was Anne Sofie von Otter. After her, Helen Sjöholm and many others have recorded it. Today it is so common that you can hardly go to an Advent or Christmas concert without hearing it.

Sissel Kyrkjebø has sung and recorded Koppången several times, including in the 2001 live concert album, In Symphony, with Kalle Moraeus on violin.

Koppången has since been covered on over 50 recordings by several artists, including Helen Sjöholm, Sanna Nielsen, Malena Ernman, and Elisabeth Andreassen. The song has been arranged for larger choral groups by Robert Sund and been recorded by several choirs such as Orphei Drängar.

In December 2019, Anne Sofie Von Otter sang Koppången at Christmas concerts in the San Francisco Bay Area with New Century Chamber Orchestra. Music critic Philip Campbell writes:

With a breathy, intimate quality, von Otter sang a gorgeous version of one of the best modern Christmas songs ever, "Koppangen" by Per-Erik Moraeus. The singer included it on her beautiful "Home for Christmas" album years ago, but it has actually improved with age.

For Christmas 2020, violinist Lynn Kuo (in Canada), soprano Julia Radosz, and pianist Alena Hučková (both in Slovakia) performed Koppången as a "virtual trio" .
