= Å, Vestland, Vestland =

Norwegian song

"Å, Vestland, Vestland" ("Oh Vestland, Vestland") is a Norwegian song praising the region of Western Norway (Vestland).

The lyrics were written in Nynorsk by Tore Ørjasæter in 1910 and the music was composed by Sigurd Førsund.

The most well known performances of the song are by Sissel Kyrkjebø. She first sang it in a television program in 1985 and it has been her signature song since then.

The song's style is reminiscant of national anthems. The melody is slow, grandiose, and contains a marching beat.

The lyrics are rich with emotion and describe the affection and enthusiasm for Norwegian nature that the author has. They begin:

Å, Vestland, Vestland, når eg ser deg slik
Med fagre fjell og fjord og tronge vik.

Translation:

Oh Vestland, Vestland, when I see you like that,
With beautiful mountains and narrow bays.

In Sissel's version, this beginning is a cappella.
