= O mio babbino caro =

Soprano aria from the opera Gianni Schicchi by Giacomo Puccini

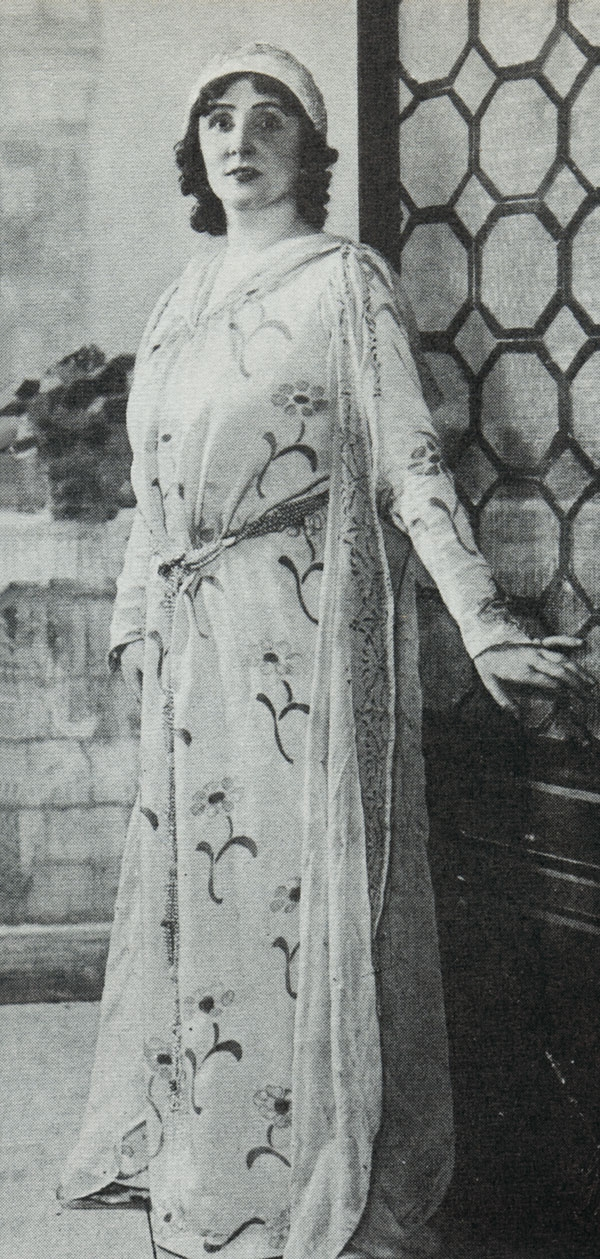
Florence Easton as Lauretta at the world premiere of Gianni Schicchi, 14 December 1918 at the Metropolitan Opera in New York City.

"O mio babbino caro" ("Oh My Dear Papa") is a soprano aria from the opera Gianni Schicchi (1918) by Giacomo Puccini to a libretto by Giovacchino Forzano. It is sung by Lauretta after tensions between her father Schicchi and the family of Rinuccio, the boy she loves, have reached a breaking point that threatens to separate her from Rinuccio. It provides an interlude expressing lyrical simplicity and love in contrast with the atmosphere of hypocrisy, jealousy, double-dealing, and feuding in medieval Florence. It provides the only set piece in the through-composed opera.

The aria was first performed at the premiere of Gianni Schicchi on 14 December 1918 at the Metropolitan Opera in New York by the Edwardian English soprano Florence Easton. It has been sung by many sopranos. Joan Hammond won a Gold Record in 1969 for 1 million sold copies of this aria.

The aria is frequently performed in concerts and as an encore in recitals by many popular and crossover singers.

== Music ==
The short aria consists of 32 bars and takes between 2 1/2 and 3 minutes to perform. It is written in A♭ major with the time signature of 6/8 and a tempo indication of andantino ingenuo ( = 120). The vocal range extends from E♭_{4} to A♭_{5}, with a tessitura of F_{4} to A♭_{5}. The five-bar orchestral prelude, in E♭ major and 3/4 time, consists of octave tremolos by the strings; in the opera, these five bars are Gianni Schicchi's words (Niente!) at the end of his preceding dialogue with Rinuccio. Many recital arrangements start with a presentation of the melodic theme; the remaining accompaniment uses strings and a harp playing broken chords.

== Lyrics ==
"O mio babbino caro"
Sung by Frances Alda in 1919

Italian

O mio babbino caro,
mi piace, è bello, bello,
Vo' andare in Porta Rossa
a comperar l'anello!

Sì, sì, ci voglio andare!
E se l'amassi indarno,
andrei sul Ponte Vecchio,
ma per buttarmi in Arno!

Mi struggo e mi tormento!
O Dio, vorrei morir!
𝄆 Babbo, pietà, pietà! 𝄇

Literal translation

Oh my dear papa,
I love him, he is handsome, handsome,
I want to go to Porta Rossa
To buy the ring!

Yes, yes, I want to go there!
And if I loved him in vain,
I would go to the Ponte Vecchio,
But to throw myself into the Arno!

I am anguished and tormented!
Oh God, I'd want to die!
𝄆 Papa, have pity, have pity! 𝄇

Singable English

Oh my beloved father,
I love him, I love him,
I'll go to Porta Rossa,
To buy our wedding ring!

Oh yes, I really love him!
And if you still say no,
I'll go to Ponte Vecchio,
And throw myself below!

My love for which I suffer,
At last, I want to die!
𝄆 Father, I beg, I beg! 𝄇
