= Sissel Kyrkjebø discography =

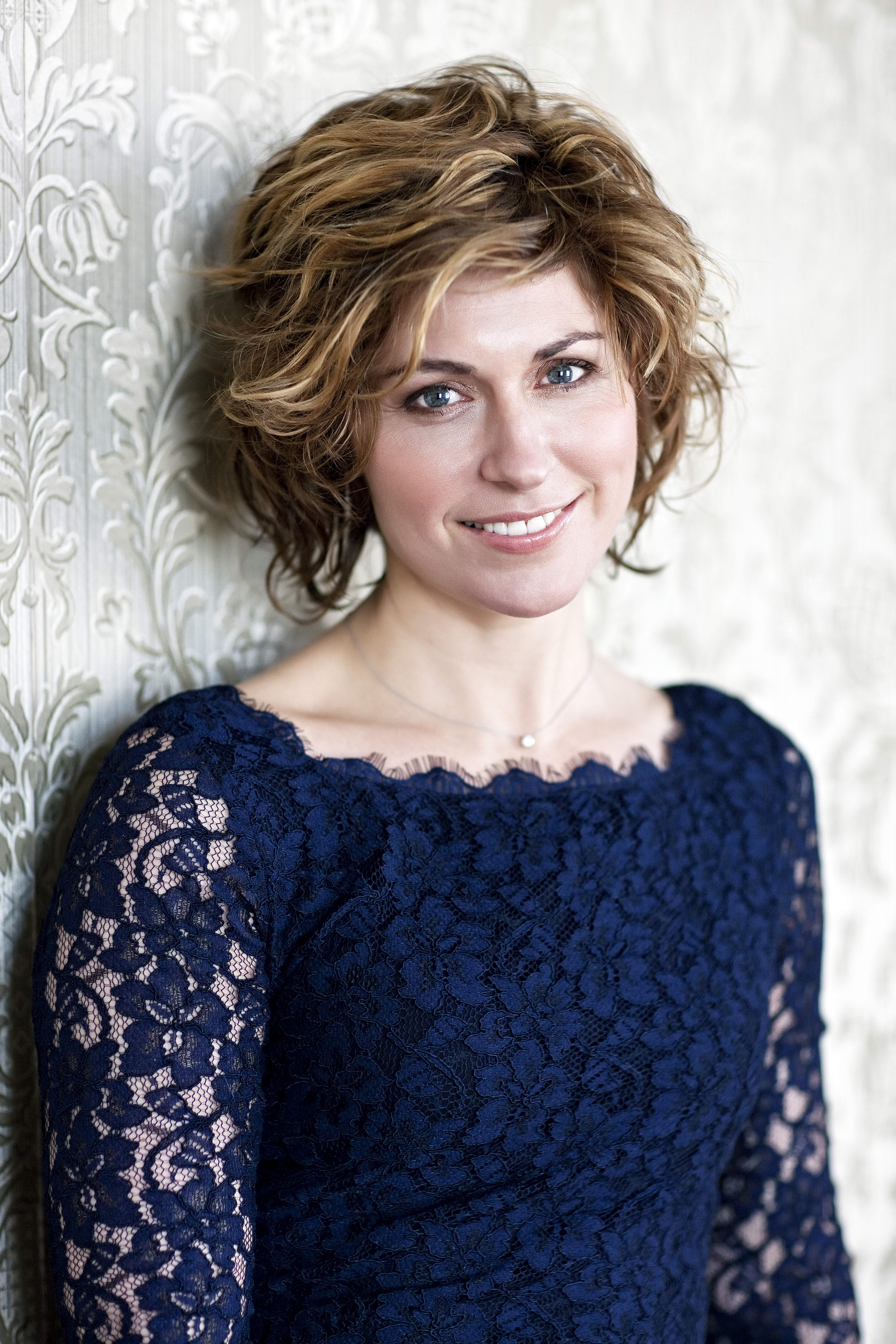
- Sissel in 2013
- Studio albums: 12
- Live albums: 6
- Compilation albums: 5
- Singles: 18
- Music videos: 16
- Soundtracks: 13

Sissel Kyrkjebø, known as Sissel, is a Norwegian soprano. A child star since the age of 11, she is now a national figure in Norway and has performed all across the globe, selling 10 million solo albums since her recording debut at the age of only 16; she was a featured vocalist on the biggest selling soundtrack recording in history, the 1997 release Titanic: Music from the Motion Picture (30 million sold), performing wordless vocals on the soundtrack.

== Discography ==
=== Studio albums ===
Year	Album title	Tracks
1986	Sissel	Norway release: 01. Kjærlighet; 02. Tenn et lys for dem; 03. Jeg trenger deg; 04. Summertime; 05. I ditt smil; 06. Eg ser; 07. Vestland, Vestland; 08. Vil du vekke tonen min?; 09. Inn til deg; 10. Frøet; 11. Det skal lyse en sol; 12. Dagen gryr
1987	Sissel	Sweden release of Sissel: 01. Kärleken; 02. Har en dröm; 03. Vem; 04. Tänd ett ljus; 05. In till dig; 06. Jag ser; 07. Det skall lysa en sol; 08. Summertime; 09. Å Vestland, Vestland; 10. Låt mej vara nära dej; 11. Dagen gryr
1987	Sissel	Denmark release of Sissel: 01. Vårvise (duet with Sebastian); 02. Har en dröm; 03. Summertime; 04. Kärleken; 05. I ditt smil; 06. Jag ser; 07. Inn til deg; 08. Vil du vekke tonen min?; 09. Å Vestland, Vestland; 10. Rosen; 11. Det skall lysa en sol; 12. Dagen gryr
1987	Glade Jul	Norway release: 01. Glade jul; 02. O helga natt; 03. Nå tennes tusen julelys; 04. Det hev ei rose sprunge; 05. Det lyser i stille grender; 06. Deilig er jorden; 07. Julepotpurri; 08. Mary's Boy Child; 09. Jeg er så glad hver julekveld; 10. Den store stjerna; 11. Mitt hjerte alltid vanker (from 1995)
1987	Stilla Natt	Sweden release of Glade Jul: 01. Stilla natt; 02. O helga natt; 03. Nu tändas tusen juleljus; 04. Det hev ei rose sprunge; 05. Det lyser i stille grender; 06. Deilig er jorden; 07. Julepotpurri; 08. Mary's Boy Child; 09. Jeg er så glad hver julekveld; 10. Den store stjerna
1989	Soria Moria	Scandinavia release: 01. Se over fjellet; 02. Pokarekare Ana; 03. Amazing Grace; 04. Blod i brann; 05. Gi meg ikke din styrke; 06. Liliana; 07. Soria Moria; 08. Sommerdrøm; 09. Seterjentens søndag; 10. Slummens datter; 11. Alle have består av dråper; 12. Grenseløs; 13. Veien er ditt mål; 14. Somewhere
1992	Gift of Love	Scandinavia release: 01. Fire In Your Heart; 02. The Gift of Love; 03. If; 04. Breakaway; 05. Need I Say More; 06. Dream A Little Dream Of Me; 07. Moonlight; 08. Here, There and Everywhere; 09. Miracle Song; 10. Solitaire; 11. Breaking Up Is Hard To Do; 12. Calling You; 13. More Like You
1994	Innerst i sjelen	Scandinavia release: 01. Innerst i sjelen; 02. Våkn opp, min sjel; 03. Se ilden lyse; 04. Eg veit i himmerik ei borg; 05. Alma Redemtoris; 06. Som fagre blomen; 07. Stevtone; 08. I skovens dybe stille ro; 09. Stolt Margjit; 10. Tíðin rennur; 11. Bred dina vida vingar; 12. Fire In Your Heart (duet with Plácido Domingo); Olympic bonus tracks: 01. Prosesjon; 02. Hymne Olympique
1994	Amazing Grace	Japan release: 01. アメイジング・グレイス (Amazing Grace); 02. 愛を捧げて (Tenn et lys for dem); 03. つらい別れ (Jeg trenger deg); 04. 熱愛 (Blod i brann); 05. サマー・ドリーム (Sommerdrøm); 06. ソリア・モリア~幻の夢の城 (Soria Moria); 07. サムホエア (Somewhere); 08. すべての山に登れ (Se over fjellet); 09. サマータイム (Summertime); 10. オンリー・ラヴ (Kjærlighet); 11. 愛は微笑みの中に (I ditt smil); 12. 恋が始まる時に (Inn til deg); 13. 永遠の誓い (Det skal lyse en sol); 14. ローズ (Frøet)
1994	Vestland, Vestland	Japan release: 01. ベステランド・ベステランド (Å Vestland, Vestland); 02. ポカレ・アーナ (Pokarekare Ana); 03. リリアナ (Liliana); 04. 私のまなざし (Eg Ser); 05. スラム街の少女 (Slummens datter); 06. この道はあなたの終着点 (Veien er ditt mål); 07. 夏の山地で家畜の世話をする娘の日曜日(Seterjentens søndag); 08. 私には，もう何の迷いも躊躇もない (Grenseløs); 09. 私に起きていてほしい？ (Vil du vekke tonen min?); 10. あなたの強さは私には必要ない (Gi meg ikke din styrke); 11. すべての海は一粒の雨から創られる (Alle hav består av dråper); 12. 夜が明ける (Dagen gryr)
1995	Deep Within My Soul	UK release of Innerst i sjelen: 01. Deep Within My Soul (Innerst i sjelen); 02. Awaken My Soul (Våkn opp, min sjel); 03. Fire In Your Heart (Se ilden lyse); 04. Castle In The Sky (Eg veit i himmerik ei borg); 05. Mother Of Our Saviour (Alma Redemtoris); 06. Flower Of Beauty (Som fagre blomen); 07. Folk Song (Stevtone); 08. In The Quiet Of The Forest (I skovens dybe stille ro); 09. Proud Margijt (Stolt Margjit); 10. Time Flows (Tíðin rennur); 11. Spread Your Wide Wings (Bred dina vida vingar); 12. Fire In Your Heart (Solo Version); 13. Castle In The Sky (1995 Remix)
1995	Deep Within My Soul	Japan release of Innerst i sjelen: 01. Innerst i sjelen; 02. Våkn opp, min sjel; 03. Se ilden lyse; 04. Eg veit i himmerik ei borg; 05. Alma Redemtoris; 06. Som fagre blomen; 07. Stevtone; 08. I skovens dybe stille ro; 09. Stolt Margjit; 10. Tíðin rennur; 11. Bred dina vida vingar; 12. Fire In Your Heart (duet with Plácido Domingo); Olympic bonus tracks: 01. Prosesjon; 02. Hymne Olympique; 03. Våren, vatnet og fela; 04. Imagine
1998	Fire In Your Heart	Japan release: 01. Mitt hjerte alltid vanker; 02. Alma Redemtoris; 03. Dagen gryr; 04. Se ilden lyse; 05. Innerst i sjelen; 06. Eg veit i himmerik ei borg; 07. Stolt Margjit; 08. Stevtone; 09. Vestland, Vestland; 10. Here, There and Everywhere; 11. Calling You; 12. My Tribute (To God Be The Glory); 13. Amazing Grace; 14. Prince Igor; 15. An Raibh Tu Ag An Gcarraig; 16. Fire In Your Heart
1998	The Best of Sissel	Japan release: 01. Summer Snow; 02. Seven Angels; 03. Mitt hjerte alltid vanker; 04. Alma Redemtoris; 05. Dagen gryr; 06. Se ilden lyse; 07. Innerst i sjelen; 08. Eg veit i himmerik ei borg; 09. Stolt Margjit; 10. Stevtone; 11. Vestland, Vestland; 12. Here, There and Everywhere; 13. Calling You; 14. My Tribute (To God Be The Glory); 15. Amazing Grace; 16. Prince Igor; 17. An Raibh Tu Ag An Gcarraig; 18. Fire In Your Heart
2000	All Good Things	01. Weightless; 02. Carrier of a Secret; 03. Should It Matter; 04. All Good Things; 05. Lær meg å kjenne; 06. Keep Falling Down; 07. Better Off Alone; 08. Sarah's Song; 09. One Day; 10. Where The Lost Ones Go (duet with Espen Lind); 11. We Both Know
2000	All Good Things	International release of All Good Things: 01. Weightless; 02. Carrier Of A Secret; 03. Should It Matter; 04. All Good Things; 05. Lær meg å kjenne; 06. Keep Falling Down; 07. Better Off Alone; 08. Sarah's Song; 09. One Day; 10. Where The Lost Ones Go (duet with Espen Lind); 11. We Both Know
2000	All Good Things	Japan release of All Good Things: 01. Weightless; 02. Carrier of a Secret; 03. Should It Matter; 04. All Good Things; 05. Lær meg å kjenne; 06. Keep Falling Down; 07. Better Off Alone; 08. Sarah's Song; 09. One Day; 10. Where The Lost Ones Go (duet with Espen Lind); 11. We Both Know; 12. He's a Lot (Bonus track)
2001	In Symphony	Scandinavia release: 01. Innerst i sjelen; 02. Solitaire; 03. Våren; 04. Vestland, Vestland; 05. Vitae Lux; 06. Koppången; 07. O mio babbino caro; 08. Se ilden lyse; 09. Kjærlighet; 10. Where The Lost Ones Go (duet with Espen Lind); 11. Mitt hjerte alltid vanker; 12. Shenandoah; 13. Molde Canticle; 14. Eg ser
2001	In Symphony	Japan release of In Symphony: 01. Innerst i sjelen; 02. Solitaire; 03. Våren; 04. Vestland, Vestland; 05. Vitae Lux; 06. Koppången; 07. O mio babbino caro; 08. Se ilden lyse; 09. Kjærlighet; 10. Where The Lost Ones Go (duet with Espen Lind); 11. Mitt hjerte alltid vanker; 12. Shenandoah; 13. Molde Canticle; 14. Eg ser; 15. Ave Maria (Bonus track)
2002	Sissel	USA release: 01. Sarah's Song; 02. Can't Go Back; 03. Keep Falling Down; 04. Shenandoah; 05. All Good Things; 06. We Both Know; 07. Carrier of a Secret; 08. Solitaire; 09. Should It Matter; 10. Lær meg å kjenne; 11. Weightless; 12. Molde Canticle
2003	My Heart	Norway release: 01. Romance; 02. Lascia ch'io pianga; 03. Mon cœur s'ouvre à ta voix; 04. Wait A While; 05. Tristezze; 06. Hymne (Jesus, din søte forening å smake); 07. Ich hatte viel Bekümmernis; 08. Oblivion (One Stolen Kiss); 09. Pie Jesu; 10. The Sleeping Princess; 11. Deborah's Theme
2004	My Heart	USA release of My Heart: 01. Wait A While; 02. Lascia ch'io pianga; 03. Someone Like You; 04. Tristezze; 05. Angel Rays; 06. Mon cœur s'ouvre à ta voix; 07. Pie Jesu; 08. Oblivion (One Stolen Kiss); 09. You Raise Me Up; 10. O Mio Babbino Caro; 11. Ave Maria; 12. Beyond Imagination; 13. Deborah's Theme
2005	Nordisk Vinternatt	Scandinavian release; with bonus-DVD: 01. Denti, du Astri; 02. Vårvindar friska; 03. O tysta ensamhet; 04. Der er ingenting i verden så stille som sne; 05. Om kvelden; 06. Du är den ende; 07. Jeg lagde meg så silde; 08. Bereden väg för Herran; 09. Musens sang; 10. Den första gång jag såg dig; 11. Bruremarsj; 12. Koppången; 13. Sofðu ungá astín min
2006	Into Paradise	UK release of Into Paradise: 01. In Paradisum; 02. Sancta Maria; 03. Bachianas Brasileiras; 04. Dido's Lament; 05. Wachet auf, ruft uns die Stimme; 06. Dusk (Velkomne med æra); 07. Ingen vinner frem; 08. What Child Is This?; 09. Marble Halls; 10. The Sleeping Princess; 11. Vitae Lux; 12. Salley Gardens; 13. Ave Verum Corpus; 14. Like an Angel Passing Through My Room
2006	Into Paradise	USA release of Into Paradise: 01. Dusk; 02. Bachianas Brasileiras; 03. Wachet auf, ruft uns die Stimme; 04. Dido's Lament; 05. In Paradisum; 06. Sancta Maria; 07. Vitae Lux; 08. Ingen vinner frem; 09. Bereden väg för Herran; 10. Marble Halls; 11. Adagio; 12. Like an Angel Passing Through My Room
2006	Into Paradise	Japan release of Into Paradise: 01. In Paradisum; 02. Sancta Maria; 03. Bachianas Brasileiras; 04. Dido's Lament; 05. Wachet auf, ruft uns die Stimme; 06. Dusk (Velkomne Med Æra); 07. Ingen vinner frem; 08. What Child Is This?; 09. Marble Halls; 10. The Sleeping Princess; 11. Vitae Lux; 12. Salley Gardens; 13. Ave Verum Corpus; 14. Like an Angel Passing Through My Room; 15. Adagio (Bonus track)
2006	De beste, 1986–2006, CD1	Scandinavia release: 01. Å Vestland, Vestland; 02. Eg ser; 03. Kjærlighet; 04. Summertime; 05. Se over fjellet; 06. Solitaire; 07. Innerst i sjelen; 08. Amazing Grace; 09. Se ilden lyse; 10. Tiden renner; 11. Seterjentens søndag, with Arve Tellefsen; 12. Eg veit i himmerik ei borg; 13. Den första gång jag såg dig; 14. O mio babbino caro; 15. Sancta Maria; 16. Lascia ch'io pianga; 17. Koppången; 18. Sarah's song; 19. Adagio; 20. Silent Night
2006	De beste, 1986–2006, CD2	Scandinavia release: 01. Barndomshjemmet; 02. Ung Åslaug; 03. Sukyaki; 04. En deilig dag; 05. Når rosene blomstrer i mormors hage; 06. If you love me; 07. Syng kun i din ungdoms vår; 08. Vilja sangen; 09. You Don't Bring Me Flowers; 10. Bergensiana; 11. Vårvise, with Sebastian; 12. What Are We Made Of?, with Brian May; 13. Prince Igor, with Warren G; 14. Mitt hjerte alltid vanker, with The Chieftains; 15. Gå inte förbi, with Peter Jöback; 16. Where The Lost Ones Go, with Espen Lind; 17. Elia Rising, with Sort Sol; 18. Ave Maria, with Bryn Terfel; 19. Bist du bei mir, with Plácido Domingo; 20. My Tribute (To God Be The Glory), with Oslo Gospel Choir
2007	Northern Lights	USA release: 01. Hallowed Mountains; 02. Hymn To Winter; 03. Jesu, Joy of Man's Desiring; 04. Koppången; 05. Sarah's Song; 06. Your Sky; 07. When Will My Heart Arise; 08. Icelandic Lullaby; 09. Ready To Go Home; 10. Quando Sento Che Mi Ami (duet with José Carreras); 11. God Rest Ye Merry, Gentlemen; 12. Going Home
2009	Strålande jul	Norway and Denmark release of Strålande jul: 01. Upp gledjest alle, gledjest no; 02. Den fagraste rosa; 03. Jul, jul, strålande jul; 04. Det lyser i stille grender; 05. Jag vill alltid følja dig; 06. I en steingrå vinter; 07. Jul i svingen; 08. Velkommen igen; 09. Maria hun er en jomfru ren; 10. Mot den nya världen; 11. No høyr, de gode folk
2009	Strålande jul	Sweden release of Strålande jul: 01. Upp gläd er alla, gläd er nu; 02. Den fagraste rosa; 03. Jul, jul, strålande jul; 04. Det lyser i stille grender; 05. Jag vill alltid følja dig; 06. I en steingrå vinter; 07. Jul i svingen; 08. Velkommen igen; 09. Maria hun er en jomfru ren; 10. Mot den nya världen; 11. No høyr, de gode folk
2010	Til deg	Norway and Sweden release of Til deg: 01. Velkommen hjem; 02. Tätt intill dig; 03. Saknar dig nu; 04. Folkestadvisa; 05. Den första sommaren; 06. Hole In The World; 07. Levande död; 08. En dröm om dig och mig; 09. Dagane; 10. Goodbye
2010	Til deg	Denmark release of Til deg: 01. Velkommen hjem (duet with Poul Krebs); 02. Tätt intill dig; 03. Saknar dig nu; 04. Folkestadvisa; 05. Den första sommaren; 06. Hole In The World; 07. Levande död; 08. En dröm om dig och mig; 09. Dagane; 10. Goodbye
2019	Reflections I	50 new songs are made available, one song every week, on sisselmusic.com from and with May 2019: 01. Unchained Melody; 02. My Foolish Heart; 03. For the Good Times; 04. Lord Protect My Child; 05. Have I Told You Lately; 06. Out of Left Field; 07. Who Knows Where the Time Goes?; 08. I'm a Fool; 09. Ebb Tide; 10. Go Leave
2019	Reflections II	11. Welcome to My World; 12. The First Time Ever I Saw Your Face; 13. Surrender; 14. Slow Down; 15. The Masquerade is Over; 16. The Man I Love; 17. In My Life; 18. Goodbye; 19. September Song; 20. After All; 21. Born to Be Loved
2019	Reflections III	22. If I Can Dream; 23. You Were Always on My Mind; 24. Crying in the Chapel; 25. Three Times a Lady; 26. If I Can Help Somebody; 27. Let it Snow; 28. When You Wish Upon a Star; 29. Make Me a Present of You; 30. River; 31. In the Night of New Year's Eve
2019	Reflections IV	32. My Romance; 33. Till the End of Time; 34. When a Man Loves a Woman; 35. A Time to Love, a Time to Cry; 36. The Very Thought of You; 37. If You Go Away; 38. In the Wee Small Hours of the Morning; 39. I'll Never Fall in Love Again; 40. I Don't Know How to Love Him; 41. I Wish I Knew How It Would Feel to Be Free
2019	Reflections V	42. Didn't We; 43. I Will Wait For You; 44. Walk away; 45. Up to the Mountain; 46. He Ain't Heavy, He's My Brother; 47. We'll Meet Again; 48. Don't Let Me Be Lonely Tonight; 49. When I Fall in Love; 50. God Bless the Child; 51. What a Wonderful World

=== Christmas albums ===
Year	Album Title	Notes
1987	Glade Jul	Norwegian release
1987	Stilla Natt	Swedish release
1995	Christmas in Vienna III (European CD title) Vienna Noël (USA CD title)	with Plácido Domingo and Charles Aznavour: 01. Hark! The Herald Angels Sing; 03. When A Child Is Born; 07. Es Ist Ein Ros Entsprungen/Det Hev Ei Rose Sprunge; 10. Un Enfant De Toi Pour Noël/My Own Child For Christmas From You; 12. The Twelve Days Of Christmas; 13. Medley; 14. Kum Ba Yah, My Lord; 15. Silent Night/Noche De Paz/Stille Nacht
1996	Julekonserten	with Various Artists: 01. Mitt hjerte alltid vanker; 04. Mary's Boy Child; 05. Det Hev Ei Rose Sprunge; 06. Hark! The Herald Angels Sing; 08. Whence is That Goodly Fragrance Flowing? with Ole Edvard Antonsen
1998	Silent Night: A Christmas in Rome	with Paddy Moloney, The Chieftains: 01. Silent Night – Introduction; 05. Mitt hjerte alltid vanker with The Chieftains; 12. Silent Night - with Máire Brennan, Harlem Gospel Choir, Montserrat Caballé, Zucchero, Pietro Ballo
1999	Julekonserten 10 år	with Various Artists: 02. Nu tändas tusen juleljus with Triple & Touch, Kim Sjøgren, The Little Mermaid String Quartet and Oslo Gospel Choir; 03. Hark! The Herald Angels Sing; 07. Mitt hjerte alltid vanker with The Chieftains; 13. My Tribute (To God Be The Glory) with Oslo Gospel Choir
2006	The European Divas - Frostroses	with Various Artists This is a recording of a concert held at the Hallgrímskirkja in Reykjavík of the Iceland.: 03. Mitt hjerte alltid vanker; 07. O Come All Ye Faithful (with Ragga Gísla); 11. In the Lonely Dark of Night (with Eivør Pálsdóttir); 14. Frostroses (with Eivør Pálsdóttir, Eleftheria Arvanitaki, Patricia Bardon and Ragga Gísla)
2007	Spirit of the Season	with Mormon Tabernacle Choir: 04. Hark! The Herald Angels Sing; 05. In The Bleak Midwinter; 06. In Dulci Jubilo; 07. Mitt hjerte alltid vanker; 09. Mariä Wiegenlied; 11. Like an Angel Passing Through My Room; 13. Vitae Lux; 16. Angels from the Realms of Glory
2009	Strålande jul	with Odd Nordstoga Differences between different releases: Norway release: 01. Upp Gledjest Alle, Gledjest No (Norwegian Version); Swedish release: 01. Upp Gläd Er Alla (Swedish Version)
2014	Christmas in Moscow	with José Carreras and Plácido Domingo This is a recording of the Christmas in Moscow concert held in Moscow in 2002.: 03. Es ist ein Ros entsprungen; 06. Leise rieselt der Schnee; 09. The Nutcracker Suite, Op. 71a: Waltz Of The Flowers; 11. Still, still, still; 12. Little Drummer Boy; 13. Adeste Fideles; 14. Silent Night
2022	Winter Morning	with the Tabernacle Choir: 01. Winter Morning; 02. The Secret Of Christmas; 03. Det hev ei rose sprunge; 04. Deilig er jorden; 05. Silent Night; 06. Panis Angelicus; 07. Auld Lang Syne

=== Collaborations ===
Year	Colloborator	Album title	Song title
1983	Syng med oss	Syng med oss (release on LP/Cassette only)	4. Barndomshjemmet; 7. En deilig dag; 8. Minne
1984	Rune Larsen & Helge Nilsen	Gammelpopens venner 2 (release on Cassette only)	If you love me
1986	Syng med oss	Syng med oss - 43 Glade Melodier (release on LP/Cassette only)	A2. Roser i Picardy; A5. Vår løynde strand; A5. Hvite roser fra Athen; A6. Ei verd som er vår; B1. Når solen går ned; B2. Sukyaki; B3. Ung Åslaug; B6. Udsigt fra Fløien
1986	Various Artists	Peace On Earth	01. Peace On Earth (Danish charity single by UNICEF against nuclear weapons.)
1986	Various Artists	Taube i Toner / Evert Taube Concert; Tevegram,1986	1. Vals på ängön; 3. Nocturne (Taube song) (Sov på min arm); 12. Älskliga blommor små
1988	Sigvart Dagsland	Seculum Seculi	10. Folket som danser
1989	Tommy Körberg	Julen är här	01. Julen är här; 11. Låt julen förkunna (Happy Xmas (War Is Over))
1990	Artister for "Vend ryggen til '90"	Vend ryggen til '90 (release on LP/Cassette only)	01. Mellom himmel og jord (Norwegian charity single against drug abuse.); 04. Blod I brann
1990	Oslo Gospel Choir	LIVE	05. Pie Jesu; 10. What Child Is This? (Greensleeves); 12. My Tribute (To God Be The Glory)
1992	Rune Larsen	Røtter	03. Things
1997	Warren G	The Rapsody Overture	06. Prince Igor
1998	Gli Scapoli	Everything Must Change	08. Bachianas Brasileiras
1998	Paddy Moloney, The Chieftains	Silent Night: A Christmas in Rome	01. Silent Night – Introduction; 05. Mitt hjerte alltid vanker; 12. Silent Night
1999	The Chieftains	Tears of Stone	12. Siúil A Rúin
2001	Sort Sol	Snakecharmer	06. Elia Rising
2001	Proffene	Handsfree	05. Vinterbarn
2002	Plácido Domingo	Sacred Songs	01. Cavalleria rusticana – Ave Maria; 08. Bist du bei mir
2003	Bryn Terfel	Bryn Terfel Sings Favorites	10. Ave Maria
2003	Peter Jöback	Jag kommer hem igen till jul	06. Gå inte förbi
2005	Forente artister	Venn (Friend)	01. Venn (Norwegian charity single for Indian Ocean tsunami relief.); 08. Sarah's Song
2013	Bryn Terfel	Homeward Bound	05. Shall We Gather at the River?; 18. Give Me My Song
2017	Mormon Tabernacle Choir	Mormon Tabernacle Choir & Friends	08. Vitae Lux

=== Soundtracks ===
Year	Soundtrack title	Song title	Notes
1986	Drømmeslottet	02. Ikke la meg gå	
1990	Den lille havfruen (The Little Mermaid)	Norway version: 5. Det er min drøm; 7. Det er min drøm (Reprise); Sweden version: 3. Hela min värld (Part Of Your World); 4. Del av din värld (Part Of Your World); Denmark version: 6. Leve som dem; 8. Leve som dem (Reprise)	Sissel was the voice of Ariel in Norway, Sweden and Denmark. She did both the speaking and the singing in Swedish and Norwegian. The Danish version also features Sissel's vocals.
1996	The Adventures of Pinocchio	01. Colosso; 12. What Are We Made Of with Brian May	
1997	Titanic	01. "Never an Absolution"; 04. "Rose"; 08. "Unable to Stay, Unwilling to Leave"; 11. "A Promise Kept"; 12. "A Life So Changed"; 13. "An Ocean of Memories"; 15. "Hymn to the Sea"	
1998	Back to Titanic	01. "Titanic Suite"; 13. "The Deep and Timeless Sea"	
1998	Long Journey Home	11. An Raibh Tú Ag An gCarraig	Were You At The Rock? in Gaelic.
2000	Summer Snow	01. Summer Snow; 11. Seven Angels	
2001	Flyvende farmor	02. Himlen over himmelbjerget	
2002	Evelyn	18. Angel Rays	
2002	The Forsyte Saga	05. June's Song; 21. June's Song (vocalize)	
2004	Vanity Fair	01. She Walks in Beauty	
2005	37 1/2	07. Funeral; 08. Du är den ende	
2007	The Lord of the Rings: The Return of the King – The Complete Recordings	13. "The Last Debate" (Disc 3)	Sissel performed as Asëa Aranion.

=== Singles and promotional single releases ===
Year	Singles	Notes	Album
1986	Peace On Earth	with Various Artists	Danish charity single by UNICEF
1987	Vårvise/Summertime	with Sebastian; vinyl single	Sissel
1987	Kärleken/Vem	vinyl single	Sissel
1987	Folket som danser	with Sigvart Dagsland; vinyl single	
1988	Har en dröm/Jag ser	vinyl single	Sissel
1989	Pokarekare Ana/Amazing Grace	vinyl single	Soria Moria
1992	Gift Of Love	3 tracks	Gift of Love
1992	Gift Of Love/Breakaway	2 tracks	Gift of Love
1992	Need I Say More/If	2 tracks	Gift of Love
1993	Breaking Up Is Hard To Do/Imagine	with Neil Sedaka; 4 tracks	Gift of Love
1993	Imagine	1 track	
1994	Innerst i sjelen	1 track	Innerst i sjelen
1994	Se ilden lyse/Fire In Your Heart	2 tracks	Innerst i sjelen
1994	Se ilden lyse		Innerst i sjelen
1994	Fire In Your Heart (solo)		Innerst i sjelen
1994	Fire In Your Heart (duet)	with Plácido Domingo; 3 tracks	Innerst i sjelen
1995	Eg veit i himmerik ei borg	3 tracks	Innerst i sjelen
1995	Christmas in Vienna III	3 tracks	Christmas in Vienna III
1995	Mitt hjerte alltid vanker	1 track	Julekonserten
1997	Prince Igor	with Warren G; 6 tracks	
1998	The Rose		Titanic
1999	Nu tändas tusen juleljus	1 track	Julekonserten 10 år
2000	One Day	promo single	All Good Things
2000	Better Off Alone	promo single	All Good Things
2000	Carrier of a Secret	3 tracks	All Good Things
2001	Where The Lost Ones Go	4 tracks	All Good Things
2001	Elia Rising	with Sort Sol; promo single	
2001	Summer Snow/Seven Angels	4 tracks	The Best of Sissel
2001	Sissel In Symphony	promo single; 4 tracks	In Symphony
2002	Carrier of a Secret		All Good Things
2003	Can`t Go Back/All Good Things	2 tracks	Sissel
2003	Wait A While/Someone Like You	2 tracks	My Heart
2003	Gå inte förbi	with Peter Jöback; 1 track	
2005	O Tysta Ensamhet	promo single	Nordisk Vinternatt
2005	Venn	with Forente artister	Norwegian charity single
2010	Velkommen hjem	promo single	Til deg

=== Other albums ===
Year	Artist	Album title	Song title
1987	Sebastian	Vulkaner	Vårvise
1989	Sebastian	Et eventyr	28. Grænseløs
1992	Various Artists	Absolute Music 6	14. Need I Say More
1993	Various Artists	Absolute Music 9	18. Imagine
1996	Sigmund Groven	I Godt Lag	29. Vil du vekke tonen min
1996	Various Artists	Best of Christmas in Vienna	
2002	Plácido Domingo	José Carreras Gala 2002	15. Cavalleria rusticana – Ave Maria
2002	Various Artists	Voices	19. Weightless (Disc 2)
2004	Various Artists	Essential Voices	04. Soria Maria (Disc 2)
2004	Various Artists	The Classical Album 2005	17. In Paradisum (Disc 1)
2004	Various Artists	Like a Child	My Tribute (To God Be The Glory)
2004	Various Artists	Ljuva Svenska Jul	03. Stilla natt
2005	Various Artists	Songs Of Praise	11. Ave Maria (Disc 2)
2006	Various Artists	The Classical Album 2007	14. Vitae Lux (Disc 2)
2006	Various Artists	20 Klassiska Jullåtar	09. Julen är här
2008	Trygve Henrik Hoff	Kokfesk & Ballader	
2009	Various Artists	Italia i våre hjerter	05. O mio babbino caro
2009	Ole Edvard Antonsen	Desemberstemninger	08. Whence is That Goodly Fragrance Flowing?
2011	Various Artists	Beautiful Voices	13. Soria Maria (Disc 1)

=== DVDs ===
Year	DVD Title	Notes
1989	Chess in Concert	Filmed on 3–4 September 1989 at Skellefteå of Sweden. Sissel played Svetlana and performed on two songs.: 25. I Know Him So Well (with Judy Kuhn); 29. Endgame (with Tommy Körberg)
1995	Christmas in Vienna III	VHS only with Plácido Domingo and Charles Aznavour
2001	Flyvende farmor	Danish familymovie. Sissel plays the role of Inga, singing the song Himlen over himmelbjerget.
2002	Sissel in Concert: All Good Things	Filmed in a concert at Oslo Spektrum, Norway in 2002.: 1. Overture (from Titanic)/Eg veit i himmerik ei borg; 2. All Good Things; 3. Over the Rainbow; 4. Carrier of a Secret; 5. Pie Jesu; 6. Lær meg å kjenne; 7. Marry Me; 8. Can't Go Back; 9. O Mio Babbino Caro; 10. You'll Never Walk Alone; 11. Shenandoah; 12. Solitaire; 13. Walking Through Fire
2003	Torsdagsklubben	DVD with highlights from the very popular Norwegian TV-show Torsdagsklubben. Includes a clip of Sissel performing Solitaire.
2004	Gullars - Og barndommen fortsetter	CD with a bonus-DVD including previously unreleased material from the very popular Norwegian TV-show for children, Gullars. Includes a clip of Sissel performing Jeg trenger deg with Gullars 1986.
2004	Jag kommer hem igen till jul - Live från Cirkus	DVD with Peter Jöback. Includes a clip of Sissel performing Gå inte förbi with Peter Jöback on a concert in Västerås, Sweden.
2005	Nordisk Vinternatt	This is a bouns DVD coming with a CD of the same title. It was shot at the Sissel in Symphony concert in 2001.: 1. Innerst i sjelen; 2. Kjærlighet; 3. Where The Lost Ones Go – with Espen Lind; 4. Weightless; 5.Å Vestland, Vestland; 6.Våren; 7.O mio babbino caro; 8. Ella Rising – with Sort Sol; 9. O Sole Mio – with Kalle Moraeus; 10. Shenandoah – with Paddy Moloney & Kalle Moraeus; 11.Eg ser; 12. One Day; 13. Se ilden lyse
2006	Into Paradise – Live from Dalhalla	1. Wachet auf, ruft uns die Stimme; 2. Marble Halls; 3. In Paradisum; 4. Like an Angel Passing Through My Room; 5. Herre Gud, ditt dyre navn og ære; 6. Adagio; 7. Vitae Lux; 8. Bruremarsj; 9. Sancta Maria; 10. Lille vackre Anna; 11. Dusk; 12. Salley Gardens; 13. Ingen vinner frem; 14. Guttelokk; 15. What Child is This?
2007	The European Divas - Frostroses	DVD included on the CD of the same title. This is a recording of a concert held at the Hallgrímskirkja in Reykjavík of the Iceland.: Mitt hjerte alltid vanker; In the Lonely Dark of Night (with Eivør Pálsdóttir); O Come All Ye Faithful (with Ragga Gísla); Frostroses (with Eivør Pálsdóttir, Eleftheria Arvanitaki, Patricia Bardon and Ragga Gísla); The Making of Frostroses 2007 (with Eivør Pálsdóttir, Eleftheria Arvanitaki, Patricia Bardon, Ragga Gísla and Petula Clark); Frostroses (music video)
2007	Christmas with the Mormon Tabernacle Choir and Orchestra at Temple Square	4. Hark! The Herald Angels Sing; 5. In the Bleak Midwinter; 6. In Dulci Jubilo; 07. Mitt hjerte alltid vanker; 9. Maria Wiegenlied; 11. Like an Angel Passing Through My Room; 13. Vitae Lux; 16. Angels from the Realms of Glory
2007	Northern Lights	Featuring José Carreras, the concert was shot in Bergstaden Ziir, a church from the 17th century in Røros, Norway.: 1. Hallowed Mountains; 2. Hymn To Winter; 3. Jesu, Joy of Man's Desiring; 4. Sarah's Song; 5. Mitt hjerte alltid vanker; 6. Ave Maris Stella; 7. Like an Angel Passing Through My Room; 8. Der er ingenting i verden så stille som sne; 9. Amore Perduto José Carreras; 10. Quando Sento Che Mi Ami (duet with José Carreras); 11. In the Bleak Midwinter; 12. God Rest Ye Merry, Gentlemen; 13. Your Sky; 14. Ready To Go Home; 15. Going Home; 16. Om kvelden; 17. Now the Day is Over (Jeg ved en lærkerede); Tracks not available on the Northern Lights CD: Ave Maris Stella, Der er ingenting i verden så stille som sne, Like an Angel Passing Through My Room, Amore Perduto, In the Bleak Midwinter, Om kvelden, Now the Day is Over (Jeg ved en lærkerede)

=== Music videos ===
- Har en dröm (1987)
- Folket som danser (1987)
- Se over fjellet (1989)
- Seterjentens søndag (1989)
- Soria Moria (1989)
- Mellom himmel og jord (1990)
- The Gift Of Love (1992)
- Se ilden lyse (1994)
- Fire In Your Heart (1994)
- Prince Igor (1997)
- Where The Lost Ones Go (2001)
- Can't Go Back (2002)
- Carrier of a Secret (2002)
- Gå inte förbi (2003)
- Venn (2005)
- Frostroses (2007)
