= Eg veit i himmerik ei borg =

Norwegian folk song

Eg veit i himmerik ei borg is a Norwegian folk song, coming from Hallingdal. The text is German, from before 1600. The text was translated into Norwegian by Bernt Støylen in 1905.

The song has been sung by many artists, including Jan Werner Danielsen, Bjøro Håland, Andrea Een, Arild Sandvold, Sissel Kyrkjebø and the group Gåte. English variations on the title include, I know a castle in heaven, castle in the sky, I know there is a castle in heaven, I know of a heavenly stronghold, and, I know a castle in heaven above. The German title is Ich weiß mir ein ewiges Himmelreich or Ich weiß ein ewiges Himmelreich.

Was featured in the closing credits of the film Downsizing, sung by Tuva Livsdatter Syvertsen.

== Lyrics ==
Eg veit i himmerik ei borg

Eg veit i himmerik ei borg,
ho skin som soli klåre,
der er kje synder eller sorg,
der er kje gråt og tåre.

Der inne bur Guds eigen Son
i herlegdom og æra,
han er mi trøyst og trygge von,
hjå honom eg skal vera.

Eg er ein fattig ferdamann,
må mine vegar fara
herfrå og til mitt fedreland,
Gud, meg på vegen vara!

Eg med mitt blod deg dyrt har løyst,
eg inn til deg vil treda,
og gjeva hjarta mod og trøyst
og venda sorg til gleda.

Er du meg tru og bruka vil
Guds ord og sakramente,
di synd er gløymd, di sorg vert still,
di heimferd glad du vente!

Når verdi all som drivesand
med gull og gleda viker,
då stend eg ved di høgre hand,
ein ven som aldri sviker.

Eg fattig hit til verdi kom
og rann av ringe røter,
fer herifrå med handi tom,
og dødens vald meg møter.

Men visst eg veit ein morgon renn
då dødens natt skal enda.
Min lekam opp or gravi stend
og evig fryd får kjenna.

Så hjelp oss du, vår Herre Krist,
ditt blod for oss har runne:
Din beiske død har sant og visst
oss himmelriket vunne.

Me takkar deg til evig tid,
Gud Fader, alle saman,
for du er oss så mild og blid
i Jesus Kristus! Amen.

== Translation ==
I know of a heavenly stronghold

I know of a heavenly stronghold
shining as bright as the sun;
there are neither sin nor sorrow
and never a tear is shed.

I am a weary traveller;
may my path lead me
from here to the land of my father;
God, protect me on my way.

We thank you for eternity
God the Father, one in three.
For you are gentle and mild to us
in Jesus Christ! Amen.

== Note ==
The English translation (made by Andrew Smith, 2005) excludes the two middle verses in Norwegian, but includes another Norwegian verse in the middle:
Eg er ein fattig ferdamann,
må mine vegar fara
herfrå og til mitt fedreland,
Gud, meg på vegen vara!

== Sissel Kyrkjebø version ==
"Eg veit i himmerik ei borg"

Single by Sissel Kyrkjebø

from the album Innerst i sjelen
- Released: 1995
- Genre: Hymne, Christian, Traditional, Folk
- Length: 3:13
- Label: Mercury
- Songwriter: Unknown

Sissel Kyrkjebø singles chronology
"Se ilden lyse" (1994)	"Eg veit i himmerik ei borg" (1995)	"Mitt hjerte alltid vanker" (1995)

Eg veit i himmerik ei borg was released as a single by the Norwegian soprano Sissel Kyrkjebø in 1995.
