= Fire in your heart =

Fire in your heart may refer to:

- "Se ilden lyse (Fire in Your Heart)", a single by Sissel Kyrkjebø
- Fire in Your Heart, an album by Sissel Kyrkjebø
- The motto of the 1994 Winter Olympics in Lillehammer
