= Julekonserten =

Live album
- Released: 1995
- Genre: Christmas, Folk, Traditional

Julekonserten 10 år

Live album
- Released: 1999
- Genre: Christmas, Folk, Traditional

Julekonserten was a Norwegian Christmas concert held annually from 1989 to 1999. The concert toured throughout Scandinavia, visiting cities in Norway, Sweden, and Denmark, and featured a mix of prominent Scandinavian artists. Among the performers were Sissel Kyrkjebø, The Chieftains, Oslo Gospel Choir, Triple & Touch, Rune Larsen, Tor Endresen, and Kurt Ravn. Each year, the concerts in Oslo and Gjøvik were broadcast on television in Norway, Sweden and Denmark. Stageway AS organized these concerts and a part of the money went to support street children in La Paz and Santa Cruz in Bolivia.

Two CDs were released from their concerts, Julekonserten (1996) and Julekonserten 10 år (1999). A rare recording of Sissel Kyrkjebø performing My Tribute (To God Be The Glory) with Oslo Gospel Choir at Julekonserten 1997 in Gjøvik, can be found on the 1998 compilation album, The Best of Sissel.

== Track listing ==
=== Julekonserten (1996) ===
1. Mitt hjerte alltid vanker - Sissel Kyrkjebø
2. O Come All Ye Faithful - Oslo Gospel Choir
3. Gabriel's Message - Ole Edvard Antonsen
4. Mary's Boy Child - Sissel Kyrkjebø
5. Det hev ei rose sprunge - Sissel Kyrkjebø
6. Hark! The Herald Angels Sing - Sissel Kyrkjebø
7. Julenatt - Oslo Gospel Choir
8. Whence Is That Goodly Fragrance Flowing? - Sissel Kyrkjebø & Ole Edvard Antonsen
9. What Child Is This? - Oslo Gospel Choir
10. O Helga Natt - Oslo Gospel Choir
11. Glade Jul - Ole Edvard Antonsen

=== Julekonserten 10 år (1999) ===
1. Introduktion - Orchestra
2. Nu Tändas Tusen Juleljus - Sissel Kyrkjebø, Triple & Touch, Kim Sjøgren & The Little Mermaid String Quartet & Oslo Gospel Choir
3. Hark! The Herald Angels Sing - Sissel Kyrkjebø
4. O Come All Ye Faithful - Oslo Gospel Choir
5. En Stjerne Skinner I Natt - Oslo Gospel Choir
6. Rockin' Around the Christmas Tree - Tor Endresen
7. Mitt hjerte alltid vanker - Sissel Kyrkjebø & The Chieftains
8. Happy Xmas (War Is Over) - Triple & Touch
9. Glade jul - Ole Edvard Antonsen
10. Jingle Bells - Tor Endresen & Rune Larsen
11. O Helga Natt - Oslo Gospel Choir
12. Ave Verum - Kim Sjøgren & The Little Mermaid String Quartet
13. My Tribute (To God Be The Glory) - Sissel Kyrkjebø & Oslo Gospel Choir
14. Deilig er Jorden - Alle & Kjelsås skoles barnekor
