= Amazing Grace (Sissel album) =

Studio album by Sissel Kyrkjebø
- Released: 1994
- Genres: Pop, crossover, folk, operatic pop, Christian

Sissel Kyrkjebø chronology
Innerst i sjelen (1994)	Amazing Grace (1994)	森とフィヨルドの詩 (1994)

Amazing Grace is a 1994 album by Norwegian singer Sissel Kyrkjebø released in Japan.

== Track listing ==
1. アメイジング・グレイス (Amazing Grace)
2. 愛を捧げて (Tenn et lys for dem)
3. つらい別れ (Jeg trenger deg)
4. 熱愛 (Blod i brann)
5. サマー・ドリーム (Sommerdrøm)
6. ソリア・モリア~幻の夢の城 (Soria Moria)
7. サムホエア (Somewhere)
8. すべての山に登れ (Se over fjellet)
9. サマータイム (Summertime)
10. オンリー・ラヴ (Kjærlighet)
11. 愛は微笑みの中に (I ditt smil)
12. 恋が始まる時に (Inn til deg)
13. 永遠の誓い (Det skal lyse en sol)
14. ローズ (Frøet)
