= Silent Night: A Christmas in Rome =

Live album by Paddy Moloney, The Chieftains
- Released: 1998
- Genre: Christmas, Folk, Traditional
- Length: 52:55

Paddy Moloney, The Chieftains chronology
Fire in the Kitchen (1998)	Silent Night: A Christmas in Rome (1998)	Tears of Stone (1999)

Silent Night: A Christmas in Rome is a 1998 Christmas live album by Paddy Moloney and The Chieftains. Almost each track features a different female/male guest artist or a group/choir. Artists featured on this album are Maire Brennan, Montserrat Caballe, Sissel Kyrkjebø, Zucchero and Carlos Nunez.

== Track listing ==
1. "Silent Night - Introduction" (Sissel Kyrkjebø)
2. "Overture" (The Chieftains)
3. "Hei Lassie" (The Bulgarian Voices Angelite; Elka Simeonova)
4. "Journey to Bethlehem" (Monsignor Marco Frisina)
5. "Mitt Hjerte Alltid Vanker" (Sissel Kyrkjebø; The Chieftains)
6. "Gloria" (Monsignor Marco Frisina)
7. "Oh Holy Night" (Pietro Ballo; Teatro Massimo Children's Choir)
8. "Joy to the World" (Harlem Gospel Choir; Allen Bailey)
9. "Lullabies" (Monsignor Marco Frisina; Paola Cecchi; Máire Brennan)
10. "Don Oiche úd i Mbeithil/On that Night in Bethlehem" (The Glenstal Abbey Monks)
11. "March of the Three Kings" (The Chieftains)
12. "Silent Night" (Máire Brennan; Harlem Gospel Choir; Montserrat Caballé; Zucchero; Sissel Kyrkjebø; Pietro Ballo)
13. "The Shepherds" (Monsignor Marco Frisina)
14. "Nedeleg/A Breton Christmas Carol" (Loerou Ruz)
15. "Finale Medley" (The Chieftains)

== Personnel ==
- Pietro Ballo - vocals
- Allen Bailey - choirmaster
- Derek Bell - Irish harp, harpsichord
- Moya Brennan - vocals
- Jorj Botuha - chanter
- Montserrat Caballé - vocals
- Consort of St. Sepulcher - chorus
- Choir of the Basilica of S. Giovanni in Laterano - chorus
- Kevin Conneff - bodhrán
- Martin Fay - fiddle
- John Feeley - acoustic guitar
- Marco Frisina - conductor
- Seán Keane - fiddle
- Sissel Kyrkjebø - vocals
- Loerou Ruz - chorus
- Matt Molloy - flute
- Paddy Moloney - tin whistle, uilleann pipes
- Carlos Núñez - recorder, gaita
- Giancarlo Parisi - zampogna
- Orchestra Sinfonica della Diocesi di Roma - orchestra
- Elka Simeonova - vocals
- Fiachra Trench - harmonium, keyboards
- Valentin Velkov - choirmaster
- Preston Vismale - keyboards, piano
- Zucchero - vocals, acoustic guitar
