= Gift of Love =

Studio album by Sissel Kyrkjebø
- Released: 1992
- Studios: Schnee (Los Angeles, California); Ocean Way (Los Angeles, California); Rainbow (Oslo, Norway)
- Genre: Pop
- Label: Mercury
- Producer: Oli Poulsen

Sissel Kyrkjebø chronology
Soria Moria (1989)	Gift of Love (1992)	Innerst i sjelen (1994)

Gift of Love is the fourth studio album and debut English-language album by Norwegian singer Sissel Kyrkjebø, also known under the mononym Sissel. It was originally released in 1992 by Mercury Records.

== Album content ==
An album of cover versions, the original release of Gift of Love contains 12 tracks, including a duet with American singer-songwriter Neil Sedaka on "Breaking Up Is Hard to Do", originally sung as a solo by Sedaka and released as a single in 1962, his own version reaching number one on the US Billboard Hot 100. Two other tracks co-written by Sedaka are included. According to Sedaka's personal writing in the liner notes of the album, when he first heard Sissel, he was "speechless", having not been so excited with a female voice since performing with Barbra Streisand thirty years prior.

== Reissues ==
Gift of Love was first reissued in 1994 with 13 tracks, adding original composition "Fire in Your Heart" as the opening track. This was the official song of the 1994 Winter Olympics, which were held in and around Lillehammer in Norway, and it was also released as a single, reaching number one on the Norwegian singles chart.

A second, 15-track reissue of the album was released in 1994, including the 13 tracks of the previous release plus two bonus tracks—a new version of "Fire in Your Heart", featuring Spanish opera singer Plácido Domingo, and "Hymne Olympique (1896)", the Olympic Anthem, sung by Sissel.

== Track listing ==
Original 1992 version

No.	Title	Writer(s)	Length
1.	"The Gift of Love"	Billy Steinberg; Susanna Hoffs; Tom Kelly	4:07
2.	"If"	David Gates	2:38
3.	"Breakaway"	Benny Gallagher; Graham Lyle	3:48
4.	"Need I Say More"	Lou Pardini; Allan Rich; Victor Trent Cook	3:12
5.	"Dream a Little Dream of Me"	Wilbur Schwandt; Fabian Andre; Gus Kahn	3:25
6.	"Moonlight"	Stefan Zauner; Aron Strobel	3:39
7.	"Here, There and Everywhere"	Lennon–McCartney	2:38
8.	"Miracle Song"	Neil Sedaka; Howard Greenfield	4:21
9.	"Solitaire"	Sedaka; Phil Cody	3:37
10.	"Breaking Up Is Hard to Do" (with Neil Sedaka)	Sedaka; Greenfield	3:59
11.	"Calling You"	Bob Telson	4:38
12.	"More Like You"	Michael Omartian; Stormie Omartian	4:20

First 1994 reissue

No.	Title	Writer(s)	Length
1.	"Fire in Your Heart"	Svein Gundersen; Jan Vincents Johannessen	4:22
2.	"The Gift of Love"	Steinberg; Hoffs; Kelly	4:07
3.	"If"	Gates	2:38
4.	"Breakaway"	Gallagher; Lyle	3:48
5.	"Need I Say More"	Pardini; Rich; Cook	3:12
6.	"Dream a Little Dream of Me"	Schwandt; Andre; Kahn	3:25
7.	"Moonlight"	Zauner; Strobel	3:39
8.	"Here, There and Everywhere"	Lennon–McCartney	2:38
9.	"Miracle Song"	Sedaka; Greenfield	4:21
10.	"Solitaire"	Sedaka; Cody	3:37
11.	"Breaking Up Is Hard to Do" (with Neil Sedaka)	Sedaka; Greenfield	3:59
12.	"Calling You"	Telson	4:38
13.	"More Like You"	M. Omartian; S. Omartian	4:20

Second 1994 reissue, with bonus tracks

No.	Title	Writer(s)	Length
1.	"Fire in Your Heart" (solo version)	Gundersen; Johannessen	4:22
2.	"The Gift of Love"	Steinberg; Hoffs; Kelly	4:07
3.	"If"	Gates	2:38
4.	"Breakaway"	Gallagher; Lyle	3:48
5.	"Need I Say More"	Pardini; Rich; Cook	3:12
6.	"Dream a Little Dream of Me"	Schwandt; Andre; Kahn	3:25
7.	"Moonlight"	Zauner; Strobel	3:39
8.	"Here, There and Everywhere"	Lennon–McCartney	2:38
9.	"Miracle Song"	Sedaka; Greenfield	4:21
10.	"Solitaire"	Sedaka; Cody	3:37
11.	"Breaking Up Is Hard to Do" (with Neil Sedaka)	Sedaka; Greenfield	3:59
12.	"Calling You"	Telson	4:38
13.	"More Like You"	M. Omartian; S. Omartian	4:20

Bonus tracks

No.	Title	Writer(s)	Length
14.	"Fire in Your Heart" (with Plácido Domingo)	Gundersen; Johannessen	4:20
15.	"Hymne Olympique (1896)"	Kostis Palamas	4:23

== Personnel ==
Original release

Credits adapted from the liner notes for the original 1992 release of the album.

Musicians

- Sissel Kyrkjebø – vocals
- Neil Sedaka – featured vocals on "Breaking Up Is Hard to Do"
- Bill Champlin – backing vocals
- Stanton Endicott – strings conductor
- Pavel Farkus – concertmaster
- Michael Fisher – percussion
- Dave Koz – saxophones
- Abraham Laboriel – bass guitar
- Jeff Lorber – additional piano on "More Like You"
- Oslo Gospel Choir – choir; conducted by Tore Aas
- Lou Pardini – backing vocals
- Dean Parks – guitars
- Oli Poulsen – rhythm arrangements, string arrangements
- John "JR" Robinson – drums
- John Schreiner – keyboards, charts preparation, string arrangements
- Joseph Williams – backing vocals

Technical

- Oli Poulsen – producer, engineer, mixing
- Arne Svare – executive producer
- Jens Hofman – executive producer
- Bob Loftus – engineer
- Jim Champagne – assistant engineer
- Peter Mark – mixing assistant
- Rob Barret – copyist
- Jolie Levine – production coordination in Los Angeles
- Recorded at Schnee Studios (Los Angeles, California)
- Strings recorded at Ocean Way Studios (Los Angeles, California); engineered by Bill Schnee
- Oslo Gospel Choir recorded at Rainbow Studio (Oslo, Norway); engineered by Erik Aunskog
- Cover design by Cucumber
- Jaqueline Fluri – cover photos
- Harrison Funk – session photos
- Doody Bache – hair & styling

1994 additional tracks

Adapted from the liner notes for the second 1994 reissue of the album.

"Fire in Your Heart"

- Oslo Gospel Choir – choir
- Svein Dag Hauge – guitars, percussion programming
- Knut Reiersrud – Fender Hallingkaster, electric sitar
- Annbjørg Lien – fiddle
- Bjørgulv Straume – mouth harp
- Per Kolstad – keyboards
- Rolf Graf – bass guitar
- Per Hillestad – drums
- Svein Gundersen – producer; recording on duet version
- Ingar Helgesen – engineer; mixing on duet version
- Solo version recorded at Oslo Lydstudio (Oslo, Norway)
- Duet version recorded at "Banken" (Lillehammer, Norway)
- Duet version mixed at Oslo Lydstudio (Oslo, Norway)

"Hymne Olympique (1896)"

- Norwegian Armed Forces Representative Orchestra – military band orchestra, consisting of:
  - Staff Band of the Norwegian Armed Forces
  - Norwegian Armed Forces Eastern Norway District Band
  - Royal Norwegian Navy Band
- Oberstløytnant Christer Johannesen – conductor
- Children's choir from Gudbrandsdalen
- Recorded by Hans Christian Roaas
- Frode Thingnæs – producer, arranger
- Egil Monn-Iversen – producer
- Svein Dag Hauge – producer, mixing
- Robert Opsahl Engen – mixing
- Halldis Moren Vesaas – translation & interpretation
- Svein Selvik – translation & interpretation
- Kari Stokke – translation & interpretation
- Recorded at Store Studio, NRK & MajorStudio (Oslo, Norway)
- Mixed at Studio Nova (Spydeberg, Norway)

== Charts ==
Chart performance for Gift of Love
Chart (1992)	Peak position
German Albums (Offizielle Top 100)	61
Norwegian Albums (VG-lista)	9
Swedish Albums (Sverigetopplistan)	41
