= The European Divas - Frostroses =

2007 live album by the European Divas

Live album by Sissel Kyrkjebø, Eivør Pálsdóttir, Petula Clark, Ragga Gísla, Patricia Bardon, Eleftheria Arvanitaki
- Released: 2007
- Genre: Folk, Classical crossover, Christmas
- Label: Frostroses Entertainment

The annual Icelandic Christmas concert Frostroses (In Icelandic: Frostrosir), held in Reykjavík, Iceland, is one of Iceland's most cherished Christmas traditions. "Frostrosir" is the Icelandic term for the flower-like patterns that form on windows when frost is present. Begun in 2002, the event brings together well-known performers. Many of them come from Northern Europe countries.

In December 2006 a group of popular female singers from many different countries, named European Divas, gathered and performed on a concert at the Hallgrímskirkja in Reykjavík. The divas were Sissel Kyrkjebø (Norway), Eivør Pálsdóttir (Faroe Islands), Petula Clark (UK), Ragga Gísla (Iceland), Patricia Bardon (Ireland) and Eleftheria Arvanitaki (Greece).

This concert was broadcast on TV in Scandinavia and released on a CD, including a DVD in 2007. A musicvideo, "Frostroses", was also released.

== Tracks ==
=== CD ===
1. Intro
2. When a Child is Born (Eivør Pálsdóttir, Patricia Bardon, Johann Fridgeir)
3. Mitt hjerte alltid vanker (Sissel Kyrkjebø)
4. One Little Christmas Tree (Eivør Pálsdóttir, Ragga Gísla)
5. Jolakvaedi (Ragga Gísla)
6. Wexford Carol (Patricia Bardon)
7. O Come All Ye Faithful (Ragga Gísla and Sissel Kyrkjebø)
8. Et Barn er født i Betlehem (Eivør Pálsdóttir)
9. Little Drummer Boy (Ragga Gísla and Petula Clark)
10. Christos Genade (Eleftheria Arvanitaki)
11. In the Lonely Dark of Night (Eivør Pálsdóttir and Sissel Kyrkjebø)
12. A Spaceman Came Travelling (Eivør Pálsdóttir, Patricia Bardon, Johann Fridgeir)
13. Silent Night (Petula Clark)
14. Frostroses (Sissel Kyrkjebø, Eivør Pálsdóttir, Eleftheria Arvanitaki, Patricia Bardon, Ragga Gísla)

=== DVD ===
1. Jesu, Joy of Man's Desiring (Reykjavik Boy's Choir)
2. When a Child is Born (Eivør Pálsdóttir, Patricia Bardon, Johann Fridgeir)
3. Mitt hjerte alltid vanker (Sissel Kyrkjebø)
4. One Little Christmas Tree (Eivør Pálsdóttir, Ragga Gísla)
5. Jolakvaedi (Ragga Gísla)
6. Wexford Carol (Patricia Bardon)
7. O Come All Ye Faithful (Ragga Gísla and Sissel Kyrkjebø)
8. Et Barn er født i Betlehem (Eivør Pálsdóttir)
9. Little Drummer Boy (Ragga Gísla and Petula Clark)
10. Christos Genade (Eleftheria Arvanitaki)
11. In the Lonely Dark of Night (Eivør Pálsdóttir and Sissel Kyrkjebø)
12. A Spaceman Came Travelling (Eivør Pálsdóttir, Patricia Bardon, Johann Fridgeir)
13. Silent Night (Petula Clark)
14. Frostroses (Sissel Kyrkjebø, Eivør Pálsdóttir, Eleftheria Arvanitaki, Patricia Bardon, Ragga Gísla)

=== TV ===
The Icelandic TV-broadcast included two more songs:

- What Child Is This? (Sissel Kyrkjebø and Patricia Bardon)
- O Holy Night (Sissel Kyrkjebø, Eivør Pálsdóttir, Eleftheria Arvanitaki, Patricia Bardon, Ragga Gísla)
