= Vårvise =

Single by Sebastian & Sissel Kyrkjebø

from the album På Vulkaner / Sissel
- Language: Danish
- English title: "Springsong"
- Released: 1987
- Genre: Pop
- Length: 3:49
- Label: Medley
- Songwriter: Sebastian

Sissel Kyrkjebø singles chronology
"Vårvise" (1987)	"Innerst i sjelen" (1994)

"Vårvise" (in English: "Springsong") is a 1987 song by Danish singer-songwriter Sebastian and Norwegian singer Sissel Kyrkjebø. It is written by Sebastian and released as a single from his 16th album, På Vulkaner (1987), and the Danish version of Sissel's debut album, Sissel (1986). They performed it on the Danish TV-show Under Uret, hosted by Hans Otto Bisgaard. It was also Sissel's debut on Danish Television, and made her a familiar name in Denmark. The single peaked at number 13 there, on 17 July 1987. No music video was produced.

The B-side was "Summertime", which Sissel also performed on Under Uret.

== Track listing ==
- 7-inch single, Scandinavia (1987)
1. "Vårvise" – 3:49
2. "Summertime" – 3:10

== Charts ==
Chart (1987)	Peak position
Denmark (IFPI)	13
