= Karoline Krüger =

Norwegian singer and composer (born 1970)

- Born: 13 February 1970 (age 55); Bergen, Hordaland, Norway
- Origin: Norwegian
- Genres: Pop music
- Occupations: Musician, composer
- Instruments: Piano, vocals
- Labels: Kirkelig Kulturverksted
- Website: karolinekruger.no

Karoline Krüger (born 13 February 1970) is a Norwegian singer and composer. She represented Norway in the Eurovision Song Contest 1988 final in Dublin, where she finished fifth.

== Career ==
Krüger's first TV appearance was at the age of 11, in a youth show called Halvsju. She achieved her breakthrough in 1988 by winning the Norwegian Melodi Grand Prix with the song "For vår jord" ("For Our Earth"), while still a student at Langhaugen Skole (1986–89). This victory qualified her for the Eurovision Song Contest 1988 final in Dublin, Ireland where she finished fifth. Later that year, she released her debut CD, Fasetter. Krüger performed the ballad, You Call It Love, from the film L'etudiante, composed by Vladimir Cosma, which was later covered by Richard Sanderson.

In 2013, she performed a series of Christmas concerts with her husband Sigvart Dagsland, accompanied by the album Jul (2013).

== Personal ==
Krüger is married to fellow Norwegian singer Sigvart Dagsland, and they have two daughters together, Sophie (b. 1998) and Emma (b. 2002).

== Discography ==
=== Solo albums ===
- 1988: Fasetter (Noahs Ark) (Peak NOR: #16)
- 1991: En gang i alles liv (Kirkelig Kulturverksted) (Peak NOR: #20)
- 1993: Fuglehjerte (Kirkelig Kulturverksted)
- 1996: Den andre historien (Kirkelig Kulturverksted) (Paek NOR: #36)
- 1999: Sirkeldans (Kirkelig Kulturverksted)
- 2004: De to stemmer (Kirkelig Kulturverksted)
- 2011: Veggen (Kirkelig Kulturverksted)
- 2013: Jul (Universal) Duet album with Sigvart Dagsland
- 2018: Labyrinter! (Grappa)

=== Singles ===
| Year | Single | Peak positions | |
| Year | Single | FRA | EUR |
|---|---|---|---|
| 1988 | "You Call It Love" | 8 | 41 |

=== Collaborations ===
| Year | Album | Peak positions |
| Year | Album | NOR |
|---|---|---|
| 2013 | Jul (jointly with Sigvart Dagsland | 3 |

Awards and achievements
| Preceded by Kate Gulbrandsen with "Mitt liv" | Norway in the Eurovision Song Contest; 1988 | Succeeded by Britt Synnøve Johansen with "Venners nærhet" |
