= Seculum Seculi =

Studio album by Sigvart Dagsland
- Released: 1988
- Genre: Pop, Ballad, Norwegian
- Label: Kirkelig Kulturverksted

Seculum Seculi is a 1988 album by Norwegian singer Sigvart Dagsland released by Kirkelig Kulturverksted.

It includes the 1987 single Folket som danser, a duet with Sissel Kyrkjebø.

== Track listing ==
1. Naken hud
2. Livshjulet
3. Seculum Seculi
4. Det går ein bro
5. Den 4. verden
6. Kan eg gjorr någe med det
7. Bygg ein bro
8. Månen lar det skje
9. Merre lys
10. Folket som danser (with Sissel Kyrkjebø)
11. Alt for ingenting
12. Ennå her inne
