= Sigvart Dagsland =

Norwegian singer, pianist and composer

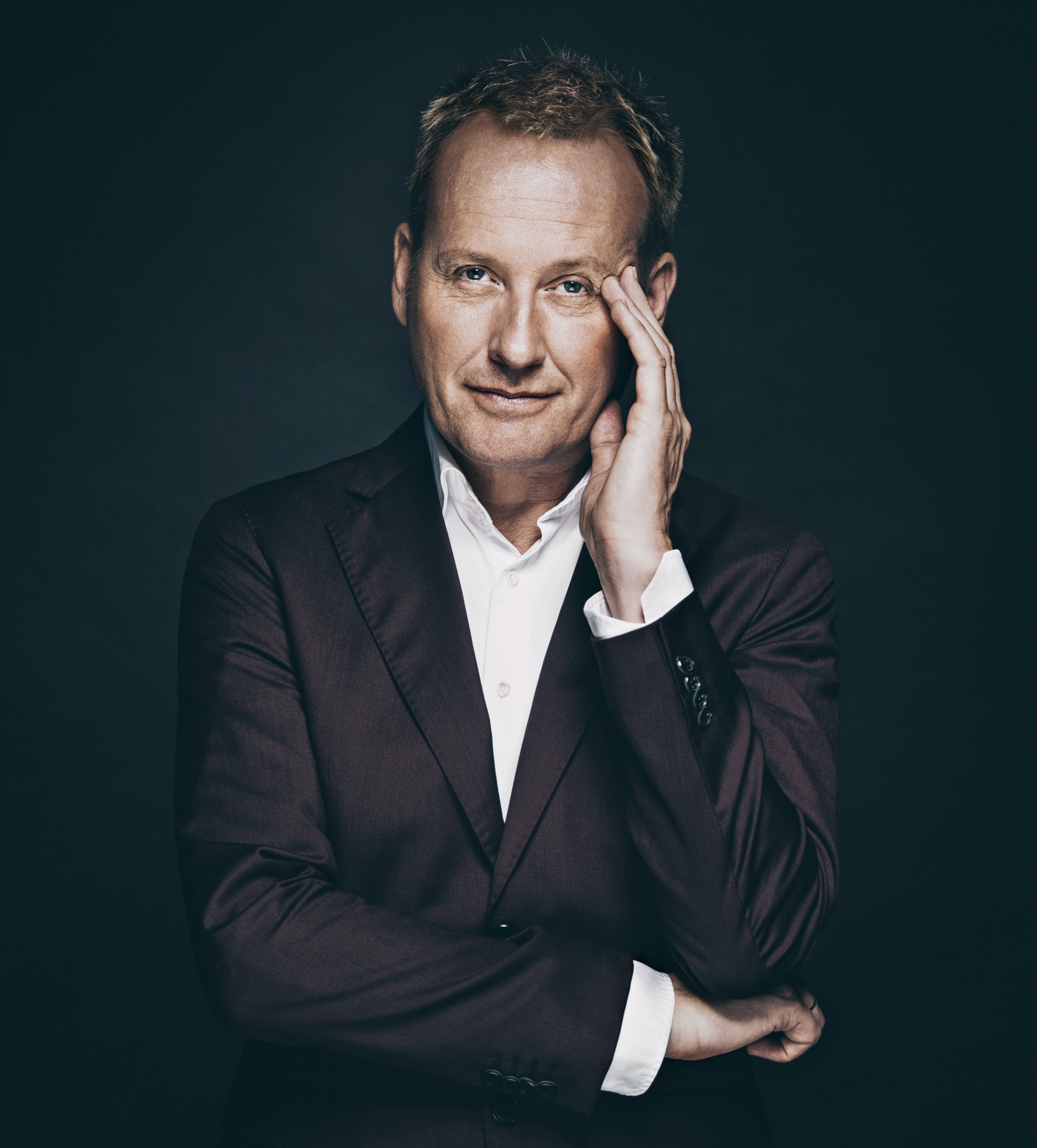

Background information
- Born: 18 October 1963 (age 62); Stavanger, Rogaland, Norway
- Genre: Pop
- Occupations: Musician, composer
- Instruments: Piano, vocals
- Label: Kirkelig Kulturverksted
- Website: Official website

Sigvart Dagsland (born 18 October 1963) is a Norwegian singer, pianist, and composer.

== Career ==
Dagsland writes and performs in various genres, his more recent albums being pop-rock. He has recorded 18 albums and performs 30–50 concerts every year, and has sold over 450 000 copies of his records. He has been nominated to the Norwegian Spellemannsprisen three times in the pop genre, and was rewarded with Prøysenprisen in 2009.

Dagsland was born in Stavanger in the southwestern part of Norway, and grew up in the Stokka district. He performed as a boy soprano in Stavanger Church Choir in the period 1975 to 1977 and as tenor in the Sentralkoret in 1978 to 1980. He holds a Master's degree in Law. In 2013 he did a series of Christmas concerts together with his wife Karoline Krüger, also resulting in the album Jul (2013).

== Personal ==
Dagsland is married to the musician Karoline Krüger, and together they have two daughters, Sophie (b. 1998) and Emma (b. 2002). He is also godfather of Emma Tallhula Behn, who is the daughter of Princess Märtha Louise of Norway and Ari Behn.

== Honors ==
- 1990: Spellemannprisen in the class Pop for the album Alt eg såg
- 2009: "Prøysenprisen" for his long career as musical originator

== Discography ==
=== Solo albums ===
- 1985: Joker (Kirkelig Kulturverksted)
- 1987: De umulige (Kirkelig Kulturverksted)
- 1988: Seculum Seculi (Kirkelig Kulturverksted)
- 1990: Alt eg såg (Kirkelig Kulturverksted)
- 1991: Sigvarts beste ballader (Kirkelig Kulturverksted)
- 1992: Bedre enn stillhet (Kirkelig Kulturverksted)
- 1994: Stup (Kirkelig Kulturverksted)
- 1995: Det er makt i de foldede hender (Kirkelig Kulturverksted), with Iver Kleive
- 1996: Laiv (Kirkelig Kulturverksted), with Stavanger Symphony Orchestra
- 1998: Fri (Mercury Records)
- 2001: Soul Ballads (Norske Gram)
- 2001: Sigvarts favoritter (Kirkelig Kulturverksted)
- 2003: Hjemmefra (EMI Records)
- 2004: Underlig frihet (Kirkelig Kulturverksted), with Karoline Krüger, Jan Toft & Solveig Slettahjell
- 2007: Forandring (Kirkelig Kulturverksted)
- 2009: Hymns (Kirkelig Kulturverksted), with Iver Kleive, Lew Soloff & Snowy White
- 2010: Sigvart Dagslands bryllups- og begravelsesorkester (Kirkelig Kulturverksted)
- 2012: Villa Nordraak (Kirkelig Kulturverksted)
- 2016: Røst

With Karoline Krüger

| Year | Album | Peak positions |
| Year | Album | NOR |
|---|---|---|
| 2013 | Jul (jointly with Karoline Krüger | 3 |

=== Singles ===
With Sissel Kyrkjebø

- 1988: "Folket som danser" (Kirkelig Kulturverksted)

With Karoline Krüger

- 2004: "Ka e du redd for?" (Kirkelig Kulturverksted)

=== Collaborations ===
With Løgnaslaget

- 1982: Klovnar uden sirkus (Plateselskapet)
- 1983: Baklengs i livet (Plateselskapet)

With other projects

- 1982: Dans med oss, Gud (Kirkelig Kulturverksted), with various artists
- 1985: Ankomst Utstein Kloster (with Rønnaug and others)
- 1993: Den første julenatt (Arken)
- 2002: Det skjedde i de dager (Kirkelig Kulturverksted), with Prinsesse Märtha Louise and Oslo Gospel Choir
- 2011: Mitt lille land (Sony Music), with various artists

Film music

- 1998: The Drugs of the World (MTG Music), with Eivind Aarset, compositions by Ragnar Bjerkreim

Awards
| Preceded by Dance with a Stranger | Recipient of the Pop Spellemannprisen; 1990 | Succeeded by Tre Små Kinesere |
