= Calvin Bridges (musician) =

American gospel musician

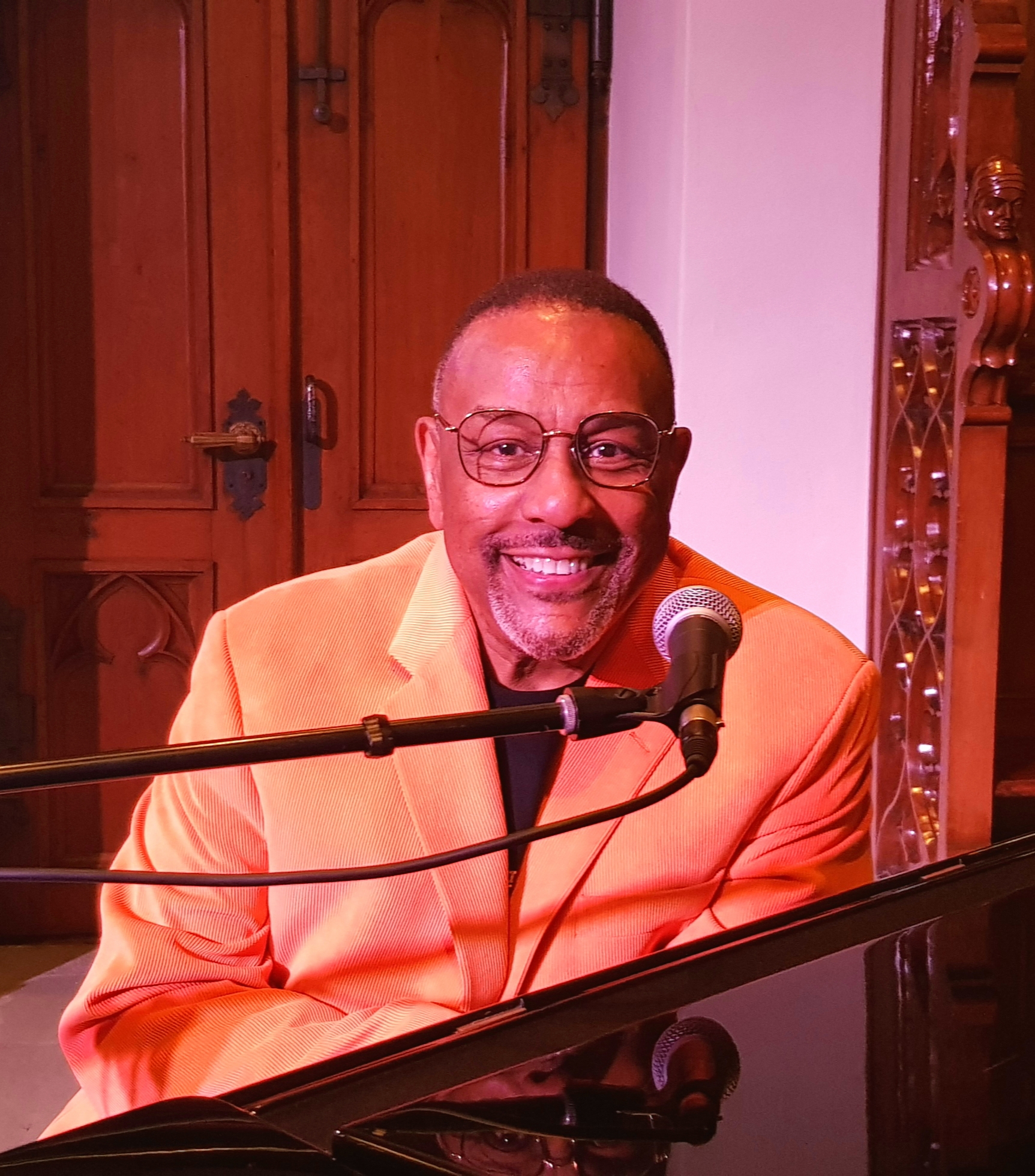

Background information
- Born: Calvin James Bridges; January 24, 1952 (age 73)
- Origin: Chicago, Illinois
- Genres: Gospel, traditional black gospel, urban contemporary gospel, soul
- Occupations: Singer, songwriter
- Instruments: Vocals, singer-songwriter
- Years active: 1988–present
- Labels: Word, A&M, Birthright, Pneuma, Spirit
- Website: calvinbridges.org

Calvin James Bridges (born January 24, 1952) is an American gospel musician. He started his music career in 1988, with the release of Renew My Spirit by Word Records, and this was his breakthrough release on the Billboard Gospel Albums chart. His subsequent album, Awesome, was released by A&M Records, which was his second and last album to chart on the aforementioned chart. He released five more albums, but they did not chart.

== Early life ==
Bridges was born on January 24, 1952, as Calvin James Bridges.

== Music career ==
His music recording career commenced in 1988, with the album, Renew My Spirit, and it was released by Word Records in 1988. This release coincidentally was his breakthrough album on the Billboard Gospel Albums chart, placing at a peak of No. 12. The subsequent album, Awesome, was released in 1990 by A&M Records, and this placed at a peak of No. 26 on the aforementioned chart.

== Discography ==
List of selected studio albums, with selected chart positions
Title	Album details	Peak chart positions
Title	Album details	US Gos
Renew My Spirit	Released: 1988; Label: Word; CD, digital download	12
Awesome	Released: 1990; Label: A&M; CD, digital download	26
