= Innerst i sjelen =

1994 song by Ole Paus

"Innerst i sjelen" (Norwegian for "deep within my soul") is a Norwegian song written by Ole Paus, with music by Örjan Englund and Lars Børke. The song was released on the Kirkelig Kulturverksted record label and was part of Paus' live performances, alongside his song "Mitt lille land".

== Heksene ==
"Innerst i sjelen" was used later on in the Norwegian opera Heksene in 2007. The opera was based on the similarly titled children's book Heksene by Roald Dahl (known in English as The Witches). The opera adaptation of the book was composed by Marcus Paus, Ole's son. It was commissioned by Gloppen Musikkfest for their 2008 programming and was first performed in May 2008 during Hardanger Musikkfest in Odda, with a later performance in August of the same year during Gloppen Musikkfest in Sandane. Johann Henrik Neergaard was director and Per Kristian Skalstad was conductor.

Ole Paus was libretto in the opera and was the one to perform "Innerst i sjelen".

"Innerst i sjelen"

Single by Sissel Kyrkjebø

from the album Innerst i sjelen
- Released: 1994
- Genre: pop; folk
- Length: 3:55
- Label: Mercury
- Songwriters: Ole Paus, Örjan Englund and Lars Børke

Sissel Kyrkjebø singles chronology
"Vårvise" (1987)	"Innerst i sjelen" (1994)	"Se ilden lyse" (1994)

== Sissel Kyrkjebø version ==
In 1994, Norwegian singer Sissel Kyrkjebø sang a cover version as first track on her album of the same name. Her album and classical interpretation of the song became popular and would be part of many of her live performances. The album peaked at No. 1 on VG-lista in Norway, also reaching No. 15 on Sverigetopplistan, the Swedish Albums Chart. The album was also popular in the United Kingdom and known by the English translation of its name: "Deep Within My Soul".
