= Pneuma Recordings =

Pneuma Recordings is a drum and bass record label based out of San Francisco, USA, owned by Dj Abstract.

== See also ==
- List of record labels
- List of electronic music record labels
- List of jungle and drum n bass record labels
