= Tears of Stone (album) =

1999 studio album by the Chieftains

Studio album by The Chieftains
- Released: 22 February 1999
- Genre: Folk
- Length: 68:43
- Label: BMG
- Producer: Paddy Moloney

The Chieftains chronology
Silent Night: A Christmas in Rome (1998)	Tears of Stone (1999)	Water from the Well (2000)

Professional ratings
Review scores
Source	Rating
AllMusic	3/5 stars

Tears of Stone is an album by the Chieftains, released in 1999. Each track features a different female guest artist or group, with the exception of Jim Corr of the Corrs, Jimmy and John of the Rankins and longtime Bonnie Raitt bassist James Hutchinson. Guests are listed below in parentheses.

== Track listing ==
1. "Never Give All the Heart" – 2:50 (Anúna and Brenda Fricker)
2. "A Stór Mo Chroí" – 3:46 (Bonnie Raitt)
3. "The Lowlands of Holland" – 3:46 (Natalie Merchant)
4. "The Magdalene Laundries" – 4:59 (Joni Mitchell; backing vocals by Screaming Orphans)
5. "Jimmy Mó Mhíle Stór" – 4:37 (The Rankin Family)
6. "I Know My Love" – 3:54 (The Corrs)
7. "Factory Girl" – 4:23 (Sinéad O'Connor)
8. "Deserted Soldier" – 4:39 (Mary Chapin Carpenter)
9. "Ye Rambling Boys of Pleasure" – 4:33 (Loreena McKennitt)
10. "Sake in the Jar" – 4:28 (Akiko Yano)
11. "Raglan Road" – 6:19 (Joan Osborne)
12. "Siúil A Rún" – 4:35 (Sissel Kyrkjebø)
13. "The Fiddling Ladies" – 10:23 (Natalie MacMaster, Eileen Ivers, Máire Breatnach, and Annbjørg Lien)
14. "Danny Boy" – 5:28 (Diana Krall)

The version released in China also included a bonus track, "Tear Lake", featuring Chinese singer Dadawa.

== Charts ==
Chart (2002)	Peak position
Australian Albums (ARIA Charts)	47

== Certifications ==
Region	Certification	Certified units/sales
United Kingdom (BPI)	Silver	60,000^{^}
United States	—	320,000
^{^} Shipments figures based on certification alone.
