= Pietro Ballo =

Italian operatic tenor singer

Pietro Ballo (born October 2, 1952, in Palermo) is an Italian operatic tenor singer. He came from a family of laborers, and he himself worked in a quarry in Sicily before changing his professional orientation toward music. He enrolled in the school of singing at the Teatro Massimo in Palermo, then his operatic career started near the end of the 1980s, mostly in Italy, at various opera stages as well as concert halls.

During the 1970s he moved to Milan where he made his debut in such a role as Fenton in Verdi's Falstaff. He sang then roles of Rodolfo in La Bohème, Italian singer in Der Rosenkavalier, and Roland in Esclarmonde (Teatro Massimo, January 1993). In 1996 he was awarded with Beniamino Gigli Prize.

He made an impressive American television appearance in the Luciano Pavarotti specials of the 1990s "Pavarotti + Plus" singing with Shirley Verrett among others.

== Sources ==
- Provincia di Palermo
- Teatro Massimo Web-site
