= My Tribute (To God Be the Glory) =

Song by Andraé Crouch

from the album Keep On Singin'
- Released: 1972
- Genre: Gospel music
- Label: Light
- Songwriter(s): Andraé Crouch

"My Tribute (To God Be the Glory)" is a gospel song written by American gospel singer and songwriter Andraé Crouch. He first recorded it in 1972 on his album Keep on Singin'. It is considered one of Crouch's most well-known songs. It is sometimes included in Christian children's song books.
