= Se ilden lyse (Fire in Your Heart) =

1994 single by Sissel Kyrkjebø

Single by Sissel Kyrkjebø

from the album Innerst i sjelen
- Released: 1994
- Studio: Oslo Lydstudio
- Genre: Pop
- Length: 4:22
- Label: Universal
- Songwriter: Jan Vincents Johannessen
- Producer: Svein Gundersen

Sissel Kyrkjebø singles chronology
"Innerst i sjelen" (1994)	"Se ilden lyse" (1994)	"Eg veit i himmerik ei borg" (1995)

"Fire in Your Heart (duet with Plácido Domingo)"

Single by Sissel Kyrkjebø, Plácido Domingo
- Released: 1994
- Genre: Pop
- Songwriter: Jan Vincents Johannessen
- Producer: Svein Gundersen

"Se ilden lyse" (in English: "Fire in Your Heart") is a single by Norwegian singer Sissel Kyrkjebø, released as the official song of the 1994 Winter Olympics in Lillehammer, Norway. It was a huge hit, peaking at number-one for three weeks on the Norwegian singles chart. In English, it is also sung as a duet with Spanish tenor Plácido Domingo. Both versions are written by Jan Vincents Johannessen and composed/produced by Svein Gundersen. It features Oslo Gospel Choir and fiddle by Annbjørg Lien. The songs were also included on Kyrkjebø's 1994 number-one album release, Innerst i sjelen (in English: Deep Within My Soul).

== Background ==
The duet between Sissel and Plácido Domingo, Fire in Your Heart, was recorded in a canteen in Lillehammer before the opening of the 1994 Winter Olympics. Because of the tight schedules of both Plácido Domingo and Sissel, they had only a few hours to record this English version of the Olympics anthem before the opening ceremony. When they recorded the song in the canteen, coffee cups and food could still be seen on the tables.

"We knew he had expressed an interest in her before. Via Deutsche Grammophon we had good connections with Domingo. He asked us to send her complete portfolio to L.A., but due to the terrible earthquake the mail arrived too late, so we didn't get an answer in time. Two days before the Games he arrived in Oslo for a concert. We tried it again, and he came by car all the 200 kilometers from Oslo to Lillehammer. A few hours before the opening ceremony he recorded his part in an improvised mobile studio, from where he had to rush back to Spain, but not after inviting her for a guest slot on his upcoming album."

— PolyGram Norway MD Jørn Johnsen talking to Music & Media about the duet between Sissel and Plácido Domingo.

== Chart performance ==
In Norway, "Se ilden lyse" reached number-one on VG-lista Top 20 and stayed on the list for nine weeks, with three weeks as number-one. In Denmark, it peaked at number 17. The international single-release, "Fire in Your Heart" peaked at number nine on Sverigetopplistan in Sweden, with a total of six weeks within the chart. The duet-version with Plácido Domingo peaked at number twenty in Switzerland and number 26 in Germany.

== Track listing ==
- CD maxi, Norway (1994)
1. "Se ilden lyse" – 4:22
2. "Fire In Your Heart" – 4:22
- CD single, Germany (1994)
1. "Fire In Your Heart" (Duet with Plácido Domingo) – 4:22
2. "The Gift of Love" – 4:07
3. "Se ilden lyse" – 4:22
- CD single, Germany (1994)
1. "Fire In Your Heart" – 4:22
2. "The Gift of Love" – 4:07
3. "Se ilden lyse" – 4:22
- CD single mini, Japan (1994)
1. "Fire In Your Heart" – 4:21
2. "Se ilden lyse" – 4:21
3. "Here, There and Everywhere" – 2:38

== Charts ==
=== Se ilden lyse ===
==== Weekly charts ====
Chart (1994)	Peak position
Denmark (IFPI)	17
Europe (Eurochart Hot 100)	27
Norway (VG-lista)	1

=== Fire in Your Heart ===
==== Weekly charts ====
Chart (1994)	Peak position
Sweden (Sverigetopplistan)	9

==== Year-end charts ====
Chart (1994)	Position
Sweden (Sverigetopplistan)	90

=== Fire in Your Heart (duet with Plácido Domingo) ===
==== Weekly charts ====
Chart (1994)	Peak position
Germany (Media Control Charts)	26
Switzerland (Schweizer Hitparade)	20
