= Innerst i sjelen (album) =

1994 studio album by Sissel Kyrkjebø

Studio album by Sissel Kyrkjebø
- Released: 3 March 1994
- Genres: Folk songs; pop
- Length: 60.47
- Label: Mercury

Sissel Kyrkjebø chronology
Gift of Love (1994)	Innerst i sjelen (1994)	All Good Things (2000)

Deep Within My Soul

Studio album by Sissel Kyrkjebø

Deep Within My Soul

Studio album by Sissel Kyrkjebø

Innerst i sjelen, in the United Kingdom: Deep Within My Soul, is the fifth studio album by Norwegian singer Sissel Kyrkjebø. It is named for the song "Innerst i sjelen", written by Ole Paus Lars Børke & Örjan Englund. Kyrkjebø's cover version of the song gained wide popularity in the 1990s.

After a tour in Scandinavia countries, Kyrkjebø wanted to gather songs that could comfort and give hope, songs that told the story of longing, strong beliefs and hope, trust and love through countries and generations. As a special treat, the Olympic Hymn and Olympic Theme song from Lilehammer Olympic Winter Games in 1994 is included. The latter was in duet with Plácido Domingo.

The song Fire In Your Heart was recorded in a canteen. Because of the tight schedules of both Plácido Domingo and Kyrkjebø, they had only a few hours to record this English version of the Olympics anthem before the opening ceremony. When they recorded the song in the canteen, coffee cups and food could still be seen on the tables!

James Horner, the composer of the music in the movie Titanic, knew Kyrkjebø from this album and he particularly liked how she sang Eg Veit I Himmerik Ei Borg (I Know in Heaven There Is a Castle). Horner had tried 25 or 30 singers and, in the end, he chose Kyrkjebø to sing the wordless tune.

== Critical reception ==
American magazine Billboard wrote, "Innerst i sjelen is an impeccably rendered modern collection/adaption of Nordic folk tunes that ranks with the absolute best of Enya for transporting, otherworldly ethnic atmosphere. Superb arrangements and ultra-crisp production frame 14 deeply moving tour de force vocals that could melt hardened steel as easily as they pierce the heart. [...] The untutored will be captivated by the beauty of the Norwegian tongue, and tracks like "Våkn opp, min sjel", "Alma Redemtoris", and "Se ilden lyse" (the hit native solo version of "Fire") are credible contenders for significant chart success in the States, particularly in top 40, AC, and adult alternative/new age formats. But come what may, this is easily one of the finest albums—and hottest finds—of 1994."

== Track listing ==
=== Scandinavia version ===
01. Innerst i sjelen
02. Våkn opp, min sjel
03. Se ilden lyse
04. Eg veit i himmerik ei borg
05. Alma Redemtoris
06. Som fagre blomen
07. Stevtone
08. I skovens dybe stille ro
09. Stolt Margjit
10. Tíðin rennur
11. Bred dina vida vingar
12. Fire In Your Heart (duet with Plácido Domingo)

Olympic bonus tracks
01. Prosesjon
02. Hymne Olympique

=== UK version ===
01. Deep Within My Soul (Innerst i sjelen)
02. Awaken My Soul (Våkn opp, min sjel)
03. Fire In Your Heart (Se ilden lyse)
04. Castle In The Sky (Eg veit i himmerik ei borg)
05. Mother Of Our Saviour (Alma Redemtoris)
06. Flower Of Beauty (Som fagre blomen)
07. Folk Song (Stevtone)
08. In The Quiet Of The Forest (I skovens dybe stille ro)
09. Proud Margijt (Stolt Margjit)
10. Time Flows (Tíðin rennur)
11. Spread Your Wide Wings (Bred dina vida vingar)
12. Fire In Your Heart (Solo Version)
13. Castle In The Sky (1995 Remix)

=== Japan version ===
01. Innerst i sjelen
02. Våkn opp, min sjel
03. Se ilden lyse
04. Eg veit i himmerik ei borg
05. Alma Redemtoris
06. Som fagre blomen
07. Stevtone
08. I skovens dybe stille ro
09. Stolt Margjit
10. Tíðin rennur
11. Bred dina vida vingar
12. Fire In Your Heart (duet with Plácido Domingo)

Olympic bonus tracks:
01. Prosesjon
02. Hymne Olympique
03. Våren, vatnet og fela
04. Imagine
