= Oslo Gospel Choir =

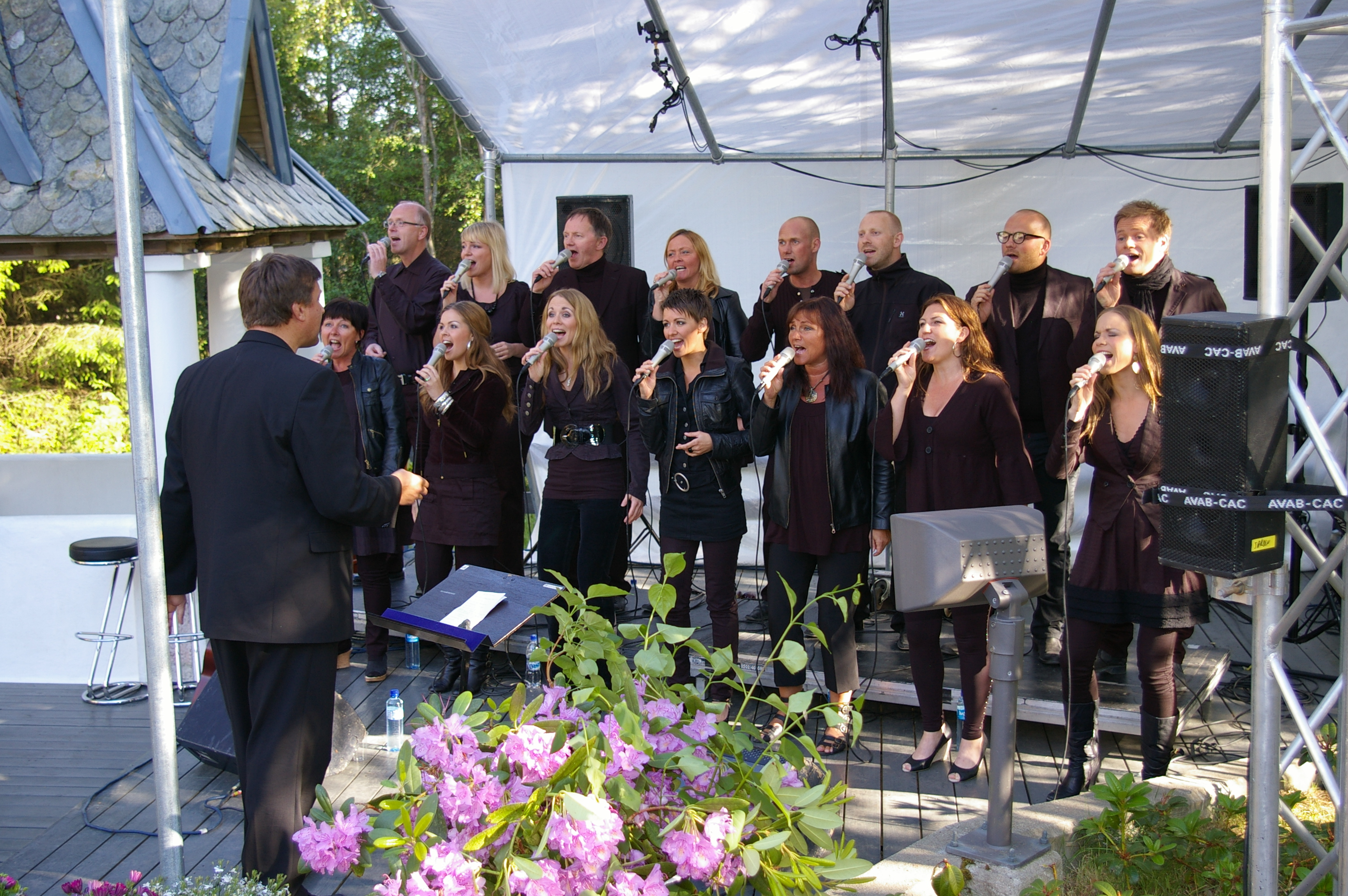
- Oslo Gospel Choir (2008)

Background information
- Origin: Oslo, Norway
- Genre: Gospel
- Years active: 1988–present
- Website: www.oslogospelchoir.net

Oslo Gospel Choir is a Norwegian gospel choir based in Oslo, Norway, conducted by Tore W. Aas. The choir was founded in 1988 and has since then become a successful gospel choir in Europe as well as North America. As of 2024, they have released 33 albums. Their musical style has been influenced by the American black gospel sound. Andraé Crouch is a major source of inspiration, with his approach in taking the gospel out of the churches and into other arenas, reaching a larger audience. Crouch has sung and been involved on several of their albums. The choir has sold over 1.5 million albums.

Oslo Gospel Choir has collaborated with a number of famous singers and performers over the years, including:

- Morten Harket
- Plácido Domingo
- Calvin Bridges
- Sigvart Dagsland
- Tommy Körberg
- Sissel Kyrkjebø
- Albertina Walker
- Ingelin Reigstad Norheim and Hildegunn Garnes Reigstad of the Garness duo
- Delois Barrett Campbell of the Barrett Sisters
- Mia Gundersen and Bjarte Hjelmeland
- Maria Haukaas Mittet
- Princess Märtha Louise of Norway (on two Christmas albums)

== Discography ==
=== Albums ===
- 1990: Live (with Sissel Kyrkjebø) - Noah
- 1991: Get Together - Stageway Records
- 1992: In This House - Stageway Records
- 1994: Tusen Julelys - BMG Ariola
- 1994: The Christmas Way - BMG Ariola
- 1994: Get Up - BMG Ariola
- 1996: Gloria - BMG
- 1997: Live in Paris - Norske Gram
- 1998: Reaching Heaven - Master Music
- 1998: Celebrate - Norske Gram
- 1998: Julenatt - Norske Gram
- 1999: Power - Norske Gram (with Calvin Bridges)
- 2000: Stilla natt - EMI/Norske Gram (with Tommy Körberg)
- 2001: Live in Chicago - EMI/Norske Gram
- 2002: Det skjedde i de dager - Kirkelig Kulturverksted (with Princess Märtha Louise and Sigvart Dagsland)
- 2003: Salmeskatt - Kirkelig Kulturverksted
- 2004: JOY - Kirkelig Kulturverksted
- 2005: Lys i mørket - Kirkelig Kulturverksted (with Mia Gundersen and Bjarte Hjelmeland)
- 2005: We lift our hands - GMI Music
- 2006: We lift our hands - Part two - GMI Music
- 2006: This is the day - Live in Montreux
- 2009: This is Christmas
- 2011: Lys imot mørketida (with Maria Mittet)
- 2012: Above All (title of Scandinavia release) / One true God (title of European release) / Stay Amazed (title of African release) featuring Loyiso Bala and Courtney Jonas
- 2012: Livets kilde - 12 Davidsalmer
- 2013: God Gave Me A Song
- 2014: I Go to the Rock

=== Singles ===
- 1994: "Se Ilden Lyse" / "Fire in your Heart" (with Sissel Kyrkjebø)
- 1994: "Fire in your Heart" (with Sissel Kyrkjebø and Plácido Domingo)
- 2006: "En stjerne skinner i natt"
- 2011: "En stjerne skinner i natt" (with Maria Haukaas Mittet)
