= Mitt hjerte alltid vanker =

Song
- Genre: Christian, Christmas

"Mitt hjerte alltid vanker" ("My Heart Always Wanders") is an old Scandinavian hymn written by Danish bishop and hymn writer Hans Adolph Brorson, frequently used as a Christmas song. It first came out in print in 1732.

In Denmark, the most popular version of this song is set to the melody composed by Carl Nielsen, with Thomas Laub's correspondence. Nielsen also had assistance with Paul Hellmuth in making the harmonies for the song.

Another version of the song uses a Norwegian version of an old Swedish folk melody, which was first written down in 1816 in Västergötland in Sweden. This is the version that is the most popular in Norway and Sweden.

== Recordings ==
A 1995 recording by Sissel Kyrkjebø is a Norwegian translation set to a Norwegian variant of a Swedish folk melody.

Carola Häggkvist recorded the song on her 1999 Christmas album Jul i Betlehem using the same version, as has various other Norwegian and Swedish artists.

The original hymn "Mit hierte altid vancker" was written by Danish bishop and hymn writer Hans Adolph Brorson.

Like the lyrics, Nielsen's melody is meditative and introverted without any drama. It spans only one octave and, for the most part, consists of incremental progressive quarter nodes. The structure of the melody process itself is also quite simple. The first four beats are repeated, after which the melody, in a broken triad, swings up to the highest tune of the melody, so that over the next sixteen beats it moves slowly down to the root in incremental movements. Thus, text and music are both simple, calm and reflective of the story of the gospel.
