= Sissel Kyrkjebø =

Norwegian singer (born 1969)

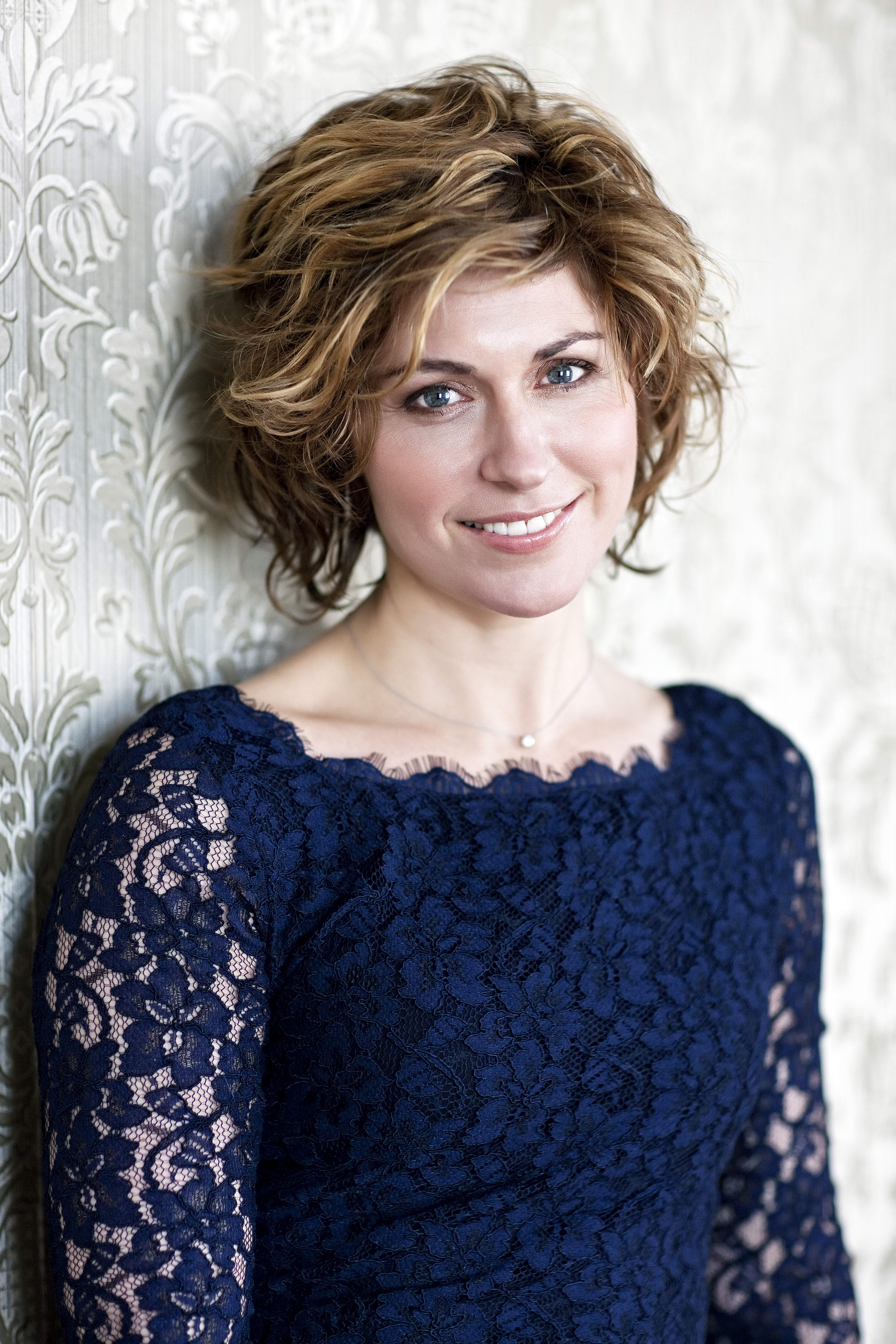
- Sissel in 2013

Background information
- Also known as: Sissel
- Born: 24 June 1969 (age 57); Bergen, Norway
- Genres: Classical crossover; operatic pop; folk; classical; pop; Nordic; Celtic
- Occupation: Singer
- Years active: 1986–present
- Labels: Denon, Universal
- Website: sisselmusic.com

Sissel Kyrkjebø (Norwegian pronunciation: [ˈsɪ̀sːl̩ ˈçʏ̀ʁçəˌbøː]; born 24 June 1969), also known abroad as Sissel, is a Norwegian soprano. She is considered one of the world's top crossover sopranos. Her musical style ranges from pop recordings and folk songs to classical vocals and operatic arias.

She rose to prominence in Norway in the late 1980s and early 1990s, and her cover version of Ole Paus' song "Innerst i sjelen" (Deep in My Soul) gained wide popularity in the 1990s. She is well known for singing the Olympic Hymn (Hymne Olympique) at the opening and closing ceremonies of the 1994 Winter Olympics in Lillehammer, Norway; for duets with Plácido Domingo and Charles Aznavour at the Christmas in Vienna concert of 1994, José Carreras, Andrea Bocelli, Bryn Terfel, Josh Groban, Neil Sedaka, Mario Frangoulis, Russell Watson, Brian May, Tommy Körberg, Diana Krall, Warren G, Dee Dee Bridgewater, and The Chieftains; and for her participation on the Titanic film soundtrack.

Sissel received her first US Grammy nominations on 6 December 2007 for a collaboration with the Mormon Tabernacle Choir. Spirit of the Season, a collection of songs from the choir's 2006 Christmas concert at Temple Square, was nominated for the Best Classical Crossover Album of the Year as well as Best Engineered Classical Album.

Sissel's combined solo record sales—not including soundtracks and other albums to which she contributed—amount to 10 million albums, most of them in Norway, a country with 5 million people. Her albums have also sold well in Sweden, Denmark, and Japan. She and Odd Nordstoga are the only Norwegian artists to have an album go 11 times platinum in album sales for Strålande Jul (Glorious Christmas).

Although Sissel sings mainly in English and Norwegian, she has also sung in Spanish, Swedish, Danish, Irish, Italian, French, Russian, Icelandic, Faroese, German, Neapolitan, Māori, Japanese, and Latin.

In Norway she is mostly known as Sissel Kyrkjebø, her last name meaning "church farm" or "church field". She started using her first name mononymously abroad later in her career.

== Early life ==
Sissel grew up in Lønborg in Bergen Municipality with two older brothers, Eirik and Bjørn. She and her parents often took hikes in the mountains surrounding Bergen. In her early years she wanted to be a nurse, but at the age of nine music became her passion.

She joined her first children's choir under the direction of New Zealand-born conductor Felicity Laurence. She stayed with the choir for seven years and said of her experience, "That was my musical education. We sang everything: classical and jazz, folk and even Māori songs. People said we sounded like an angel choir because we had this very clean pure sound, almost like an English boys' choir."

Sissel won her first local talent competition when she was ten. She was influenced by various musical genres; her parents were interested in country music and classical music and her brothers in rock music. She has also stated that Barbra Streisand, Kathleen Battle, and Kate Bush were inspirations.

Her first name "Sissel" is a Norwegian variant of "Cecilia". This is a popular first name from Saint Cecilia, the patron saint of church music. Her last name, meaning "church farm" or "church field", may be derived from an agricultural property owned by or located near the local church.

== Career ==
=== 1983–1985: First television appearances, Syng med oss ===
In 1980, she appeared in the sing-along program Syng med oss (Sing with us) together with a children's choir. Her first solo appearance was in 1984, when she sang the Norwegian folk song "Ung Åslaug". Sissel performed in this program many times until 1989. Her first solo television appearance without the choir was in 1983 on Norwegian television, with the song "Evergreen" in the children's program Halvsju. Later in the same year, she and Rune Larsen, her later manager, guested the television program Husker du? ("Do You Remember?"), hosted by Odd Grythe, in which she performed "Barndomshjemmet" (Childhood Home) and "Sukiyaki".

Her signature song has been "Å, Vestland, Vestland" (O, Westland, Westland) ever since she first sang it on Syng med oss in 1985.

=== 1986–1994: Rise to prominence in Norway, Sissel, Soria Moria, and Innerst i sjelen ===
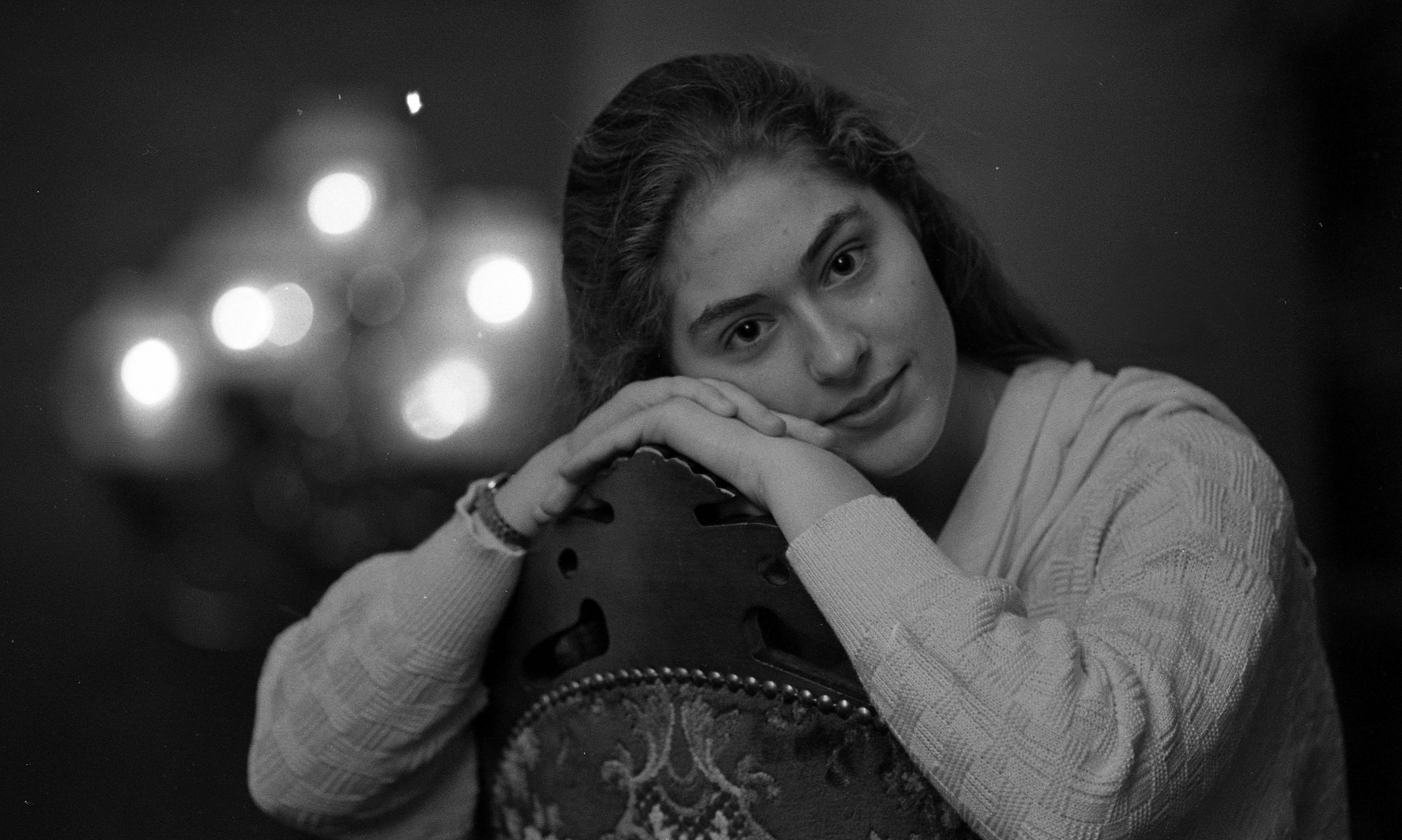
Sissel in 1986

In January 1986, Sissel appeared on the Norwegian television show Kanal 1, hosted by Ivar Dyrhaug. She performed "You Don't Bring Me Flowers", by Barbra Streisand, and later, in February, she performed "Comin' In and Out of Your Life" on the 1986 Alpine Skiing World Cup television show in Norway. In May, Sissel performed "Bergensiana" during the intermission of the Eurovision Song Contest 1986, which took place in Grieg Hall in her home town of Bergen. That was her big breakthrough and in the same year, her first album, Sissel, was released. It sold more than 500,000 copies, making it the best-selling album in Norway at that time.

In 1987, Sissel made her debut on Danish television on Under Uret, hosted by Hans Otto Bisgaard. She performed two songs: "Vårvise" (Springtime), with Danish singer/composer Sebastian, and "Summertime". Later that year, in November, Sissel released her Christmas album Glade Jul (Merry Christmas) with several traditional Christmas carols. It broke her previous record for best-selling album in Norway, and still holds the record. Upon its release, it sold more than 600,000 copies in a country with a population of fewer than 5 million. To date, it has sold approximately 1 million copies. In Sweden, a Swedish-language version was released, called Stilla natt (Silent Night). Norwegian newspaper Dagbladet honored her as "The Name of the Year" in December. Sissel also was invited that year to represent Norway in the Eurovision Song Contest 1987, but she declined, wanting a break from her music career.

She attended a commercial upper-secondary school in Bergen, but in February of 1988 she performed at the memorial concert for singer/songwriter Trygve Henrik Hoff in Tromsø. He had written several of the songs on her debut album, Sissel, from 1986 but died in 1987. In the fall of 1988, Sissel moved to Oslo for a short period to play the role of Maria von Trapp in the Norwegian version of The Sound of Music. This production set box-office records and was seen by over 110,000 people.

In 1989, she released her third album, Soria Moria, named after a Norwegian fairy tale, which sold 180,000 copies. In the summer of the same year, Sissel travelled to the US and performed in New York City on the television program Artists for Our Common Future, which was broadcast around the world, singing "Summertime" and "Somewhere". On a Swedish television concert recorded in Gothenburg, she met Danish comedian and singer Eddie Skoller, whom she later married, at which they sang "Vårvise" (Springtime) by Sebastian.

In 1990, Sissel recorded the singing parts of the character Princess Ariel for the Danish, Norwegian, and Swedish versions of the 1989 Disney movie The Little Mermaid, and played the voice role of Ariel in the Norwegian and Swedish versions. In the same year, Sissel visited the Faeroe Islands, developing a project called "Kystland" (Coastland). It resulted in two television programs, Med Sissel til Kirkjubø (With Sissel to Kirkjubø) and the church concert Tidin rennur (Time is Running Out).

In December 1990, Sissel opened the new concert hall in Oslo, Oslo Spektrum, at the Christmas concert Å gi er å se (To Give Is to See).

In 1991, Sissel toured Norway and Denmark with her very successful church concert Tidin rennur (Time is Running Out). In the fall of 1991, Sissel met and performed with Neil Sedaka on the Norwegian television show Momarkedet, singing Sedaka's song "Solitaire" while he played the piano. He was very impressed, and they collaborated on her next album, Gift of Love, which would come out the next year as her first album featuring only songs with English lyrics. On it Sissel sang three songs written by Sedaka, including a duet with him on "Breaking Up Is Hard To Do".

In the winter of 1992, Sissel made a short appearance at the closing ceremony of the Olympics in Albertville, France. Dressed as a princess and seated on a giant fake polar bear as in the Norwegian folktale Kvitebjørn kong Valemon (White Bear King Valemon), she performed "Molde Canticle" (Molde is the name of the location of an annual music festival in Norway) by Jan Garbarek. She was also named one of the official musicians for the upcoming 1994 Winter Olympic Games in Lillehammer, Norway. In October, Sissel's album Gift of Love was released but sold only 60,000 copies, receiving criticism for her new style. Later that year, she joined Neil Sedaka on his fall tour in Norway and also did several event performances in the US.

In the summer of 1993, Sissel played the role of Solveig in Peer Gynt, by Henrik Ibsen, at Den Nationale Scene (The National Scene) in Bergen, a performance that was very well received by critics. Later, in August, her marriage to Eddie Skoller took place in Mariakirken (St. Mary's Church) in Bergen. Thousands of fans waited in the rain outside the church to get a glimpse of Sissel after the wedding ceremony. The wedding received a great deal of attention from the Norwegian and Danish press.

In February 1994, Sissel performed during the opening and closing ceremonies of the 1994 Winter Olympics in Lillehammer. During the Olympics, legendary Spanish tenor Plácido Domingo visited Norway, where he came across one of her earlier albums. He contacted Sissel and the next day they recorded "Fire in Your Heart", an English version of "Se ilden lyse", the official theme song of the Lillehammer Olympics. These two versions of the song were released in February 1994 on Sissel's solo album Innerst i sjelen (Deep in My Soul), a collection of Nordic folk songs. Domingo invited Sissel, along with world-renowned French singer Charles Aznavour, to take part in his annual Christmas in Vienna concert later that year. The concert was broadcast around the world and released as an album internationally.

=== 1995–2001: Climb to international recognition, All Good Things and In Symphony ===
In 1995, Sissel was invited to perform at the 1995 Live For Peace – Royal Gala in London. In celebration of 50 years since VE Day—the end of World War II in Europe—she performed before Charles, then Prince of Wales and other Royal Family members in the London Coliseum, singing the renowned aria "O Mio Babbino Caro" (O My Dear Papa) from the opera Gianni Schicchi by Giacomo Puccini, and the Norwegian classic "Vitae Lux" (Light of Life) with the choir Gli Scapoli (The Bachelors).

In 1997, Sissel toured the US with the Irish group The Chieftains. They appeared, among other places, on the Late Show with David Letterman and in Carnegie Hall. Later that summer, Sissel was involved in recording the soundtrack to the film Titanic. The soundtrack, titled Titanic: Music from the Motion Picture, became immensely popular, reaching No. 1 on the Billboard charts and selling more than 30 million copies worldwide. James Horner, the composer of the film's music, knew Sissel from her album Innerst i sjelen (Deep in My Soul) and he particularly liked how she sang Eg veit i himmerik ei borg (I know in Heaven there is a castle). Horner had tried out 25 or 30 singers before deciding on Sissel. She was then scheduled to record the theme song to James Cameron's 1997 blockbuster film Titanic, but Celine Dion's vocals were preferred due to Horner's decision to support Dion's career. In an interview from December 2014, Horner said: "When I had completed the Titanic [movie], I had to decide for Celine Dion or Sissel['s] [vocals]. Sissel I am very close, while Celine I had known since she was 18, and I had already written three film songs for [her]. But that was before Celine was known and filmmakers and marketing people had not done what they should have done for Celine and [her] songs. So I felt I owed her a Titanic chance, but I could [still] have used Sissel there." Instead, Sissel completed much of the film score for the soundtrack album.

Sissel had a No.1 hit across Europe in 1998 with "Prince Igor", a duet with an American rapper Warren G on the concept album The Rapsody Overture, which combined American rappers with European opera singers. She sang an aria from Alexander Borodin's opera Prince Igor during the chorus, while Warren G rapped. When the song was recorded, she had just a half hour to learn the Russian lyrics. She got help from a Russian taxi driver in New York City—whose name, coincidentally, was Igor. Although she had been on her way to the airport, the taxi driver drove her directly to the studio and followed her in. He helped her sing the Russian words correctly while she recorded her part of the lyrics. In the end, he was satisfied and they made it to the airport afterwards.

On St. Patrick's Day that year, Sissel made her second performance on the Late Show, singing "Love, Will You Marry Me?" with The Chieftains.

In 1999, Sissel started working on a new album with producer Rick Chertoff, and travelled between Copenhagen and New York. Although the CD was to be released in 2000, she was unhappy with the results of the recording sessions and scrapped the album. That year she sang the Irish Gaelic song Siúil A Rún on The Chieftains' 1999 album Tears of Stone.

At the beginning of 2000, Bergen was designated as the "European city of culture" and Sissel performed at the opening ceremony. In May, as a part of Bergen's Nattjazz Festival, she performed at a concert at which she sang several duets with jazz singer Diana Krall. In November 2000, Sissel released (in Norway only) her album, All Good Things, which was her first solo album in nearly seven years. Following high sales of 300,000 copies, the album was released throughout Europe and Asia the following year, including a duet with fellow Norwegian singer Espen Lind on "Where the Lost Ones Go" that was also released on his album This Is Pop Music the next year.

Sissel also released a greatest-hits collection in Japan that included two new songs in collaboration with Gheorghe Zamfir, a Romanian pan-flutist. These songs were used on the Japanese television show Summer Snow, one of which was the show's theme song. Enormously popular in Japan, Sissel has released several Japanese versions of her albums there.

In 2001, Sissel was asked to sing a duet with the Danish goth rockers Sort Sol (Black Sun). Inspired by the Kylie Minogue/Nick Cave ballad "Where the Wild Roses Grow", she sang with Sort Sol on the track "Elia Rising" from their album Snakecharmer, released in May 2001.

=== 2002–2008: More international success, My Heart, Nordisk Vinternatt and Into Paradise ===
On 1 October 2002, Sissel released her first album in the US, which sold over 100,000 copies in its first three months of release with hardly any advertising or marketing—better than Decca record executives had expected, their initial goal having been 100,000 copies in the first nine months. The album, titled Sissel, was largely a re-recording of songs from her Norwegian album, All Good Things with the addition of two songs, "Solitaire" and "Shenandoah". In late 2002, one of Sissel's concerts was filmed at the Oslo Spektrum and later broadcast on PBS in the US in March 2003. Among her guests was British singer Russell Watson. The production was subsequently released as the DVD Sissel in Concert. In December 2002, she was invited to represent Norway at the Nobel Peace Prize Concert, singing in a duet with Josh Groban.

In April 2003, Sissel performed in Tokyo, Japan. During April and May, she also toured the US, visiting Philadelphia, St. Louis, and New York City. A Poulsen rose—a rose bred to thrive in cold Scandinavian winters—was named after Sissel on 10 August in Denmark with the accolade, "She spreads joy among all of us with her wonderful voice". During the award ceremony in the garden of Haraldsted Church, Sissel performed "The Rose", "Vatnet, våren, fela", and "Solveig's Song". Later that year, she sang with Swedish singer Peter Jöback on the Christmas single "Gå inte forbi" (Don't Pass By) for his new holiday CD and also guested him on his Christmas tour in Sweden.

Sissel released her second US album, My Heart, in March 2004. It was a classical crossover album, including two pop songs written by Richard Marx and one ballad, "Wait A While", written by Jon Lord of Deep Purple. My Heart reached No. 3 on the Billboard Classical Album Chart after debuting at No. 7 and spent 31 weeks there. In the summer and fall of 2004, Sissel went on tour with The Lord of the Rings Symphony. She was a featured soloist for an orchestral performance dedicated to the music from The Lord of the Rings films.

In May 2005, Sissel performed with the Mormon Tabernacle Choir in Salt Lake City, Utah, on its radio and television broadcast, Music and the Spoken Word, featured on nearly 2,000 stations across the US and around the world. She joined the choir to commemorate the centennial of Norwegian independence from Sweden, which was being celebrated that year. She sang the ABBA song "Like An Angel Passing Through My Room"; "Vitae Lux" (Light of Life); the traditional Norwegian hymn "Herre gud, ditt dyre navn og ære" (Lord God, Your Precious Name and Glory); and the Norwegian national anthem "Ja, vi elsker dette landet" (Yes, We Love This Country) with the choir.

On 8 October 2005, King Harald of Norway made Sissel a Knight of the 1st Class in the Order of St. Olav for her contributions to music and as an ambassador for Norway. She was 36 years old. The ceremony was held on 25 January at the Hotel Bristol in Oslo. In the same month, Sissel was invited to perform in the well-known temple-concert, Ninna-ji Otobutai, in Osaka, Japan, where she sang "Pie Jesu" (Merciful Jesus); "Sancta Maria" (Holy Mary, an intermezzo from Pietro Mascagni's opera Cavalleria Rusticana); "You Raise Me Up"; and several other songs. This concert was aired on television in Japan.

In December 2006, Sissel again joined the Mormon Tabernacle Choir as the featured soloist for its annual Christmas concerts. In four performances, she sang for more than 80,000 people in the 21,000-seat Conference Center in Salt Lake City. The concerts were videotaped for PBS television and aired the year after, in December 2007. She also celebrated more than 20 years in the music industry with the release of a greatest-hits album presenting 40 of her best and most well-known songs, including some never before released. In December she toured Norway with her Christmas concerts, including a mix of Christmas carols and hits from her greatest-hits release that year.

In March 2007, a statistically representative sample of the Norwegian population chose Sissel as the best female Norwegian musical artist in competition with 15 other famous names, including Lene Marlin, Wenche Myhre, Kari Bremnes, and Bertine Zetlitz. In the summer of 2007, she toured Norway, Sweden, and the US with a band but without a choir. According to Sissel, this was a new concert format for her. For the 2007 holiday season, PBS stations aired two concerts starring her as part of the December pledge drive, one with the Mormon Tabernacle Choir titled Spirit of the Season, released on CD and DVD in late September 2007; the other with operatic legend and good friend José Carreras titled Northern Lights, released on CD and DVD in early November 2007. These concert albums have proven to be extremely popular, with Northern Lights reaching No. 10 on the Billboard Classical Crossover list and Spirit of the Season staying firmly planted at No.1 on the Billboard Classical charts for nine consecutive weeks.

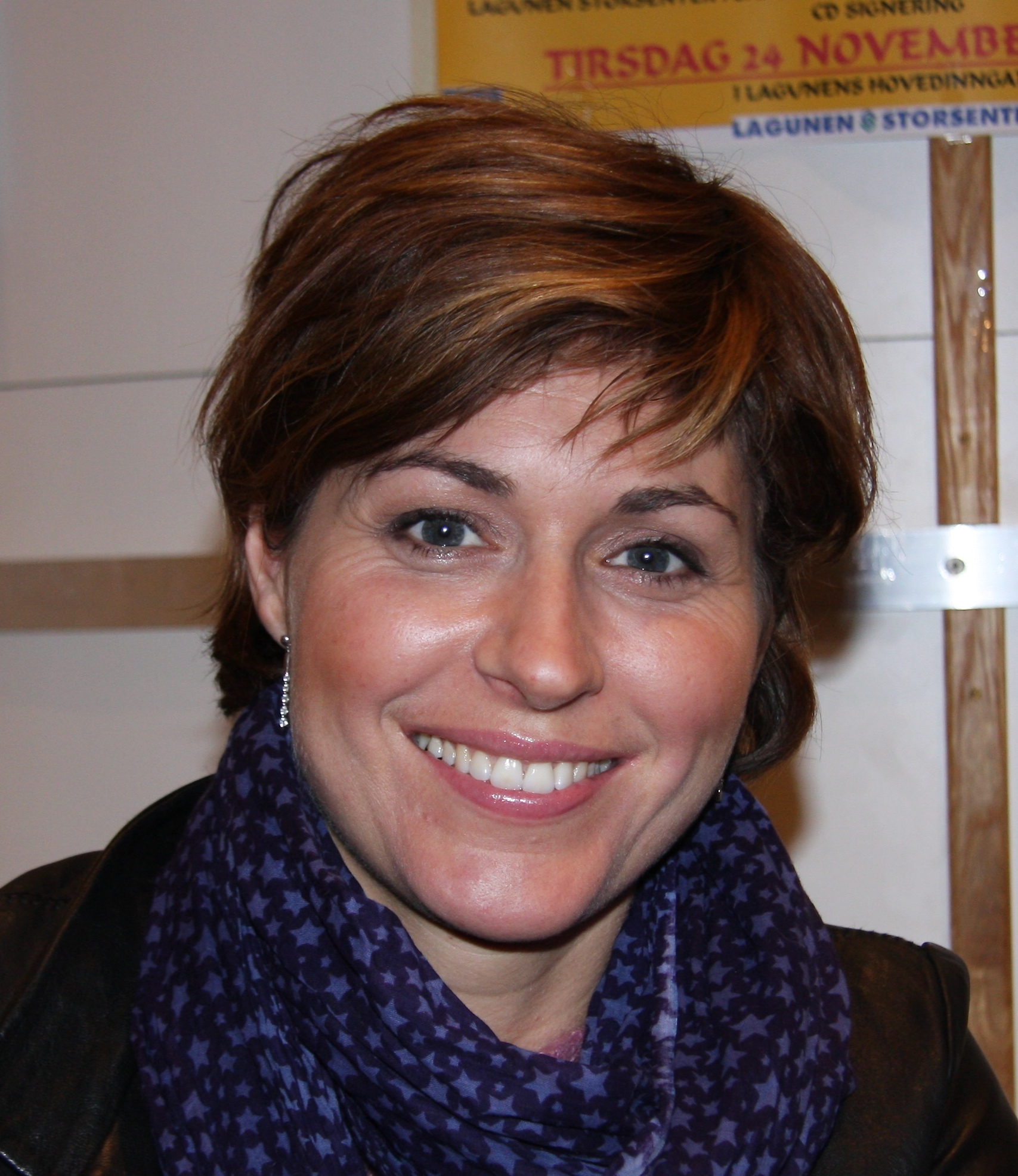
Sissel in 2009

The album Northern Lights is a live recording of a concert at Bergstadens Ziir ("Jewel of the Mountain Town" in German), a church from the 17th century in Røros, Norway, a 17th-century mining town. This recording was inspired by Norway's winter, the Blue hour, and the mystical Northern Lights, with music arranged by Kjetil Bjerkestrand.Sharing the stage with Sissel were the Trondheim Soloists, the Nidaros Cathedral Girls Choir, and Sissel's own band and featuring the tenor José Carreras, performing the Julio Iglesias/Dolly Parton-duet "When You Tell Me That You Love Me" with Sissel. She conducted an eight-city US tour in February 2008, singing selections from Northern Lights. A second leg of the tour covered more cities in the central and southern US and lasted through April.

=== 2009–present: New influences and break from music, Strålande Jul and Til deg ===
On 9 November 2009, Sissel released a new Christmas album called Strålande Jul (Glorious Christmas), a project with Odd Nordstoga, another popular Norwegian singer. This album presented mostly lesser-known Christmas carols from Scandinavia. Sissel toured in both Norway and Sweden with Nordstoga; The Real Group; Orsa Spelmän; and Krister Henrikson. This album and their sold-out Christmas concerts received much critical acclaim in Norway and Sweden. The record company Universal Music anticipated sales of about 100,000 CDs but ultimately sold more than 400,000 in Norway in the first two months.

In May 2010, Sissel visited China with the Trondheim Soloists, appearing at Expo 2010 in Shanghai. They performed songs like "Jag vill alltid følja dig" (I Always Want to Follow You), "Solveig's Song", and "Wait A While". Parts of these concerts were broadcast on Norwegian television in the summer of 2010.

On 20 September 2010, an unauthorized biography of Sissel titled Sissel by Stig Nilsson was released in Norway. He had written several songs for Sissel earlier in her career. In the book, Nilsson claims—among other things—that Sissel never became a worldwide superstar because she did not want to be. The book has been released only in Norwegian. On 15 November 2010, Sissel released a new album in Scandinavia called "Til deg" (For You), recorded in ABBA's Polar Studios in Stockholm; Nidaros Studios in Trondheim; and Nashville. This album showed a new direction in music heavily influenced by the style of country music, roots, and folk. The album featured five songs in Swedish, three in Norwegian, and two in English, including a Norwegian translation of Victoria Shaw's song "Never Alone" titled "Velkommen hjem", and a Swedish cover of Alison Krauss' song "Ghost in This House" titled "Levande död". Collaborating with Sissel on the new album were Mikael Wiehe, Espen Lind, and Py Bäckman.

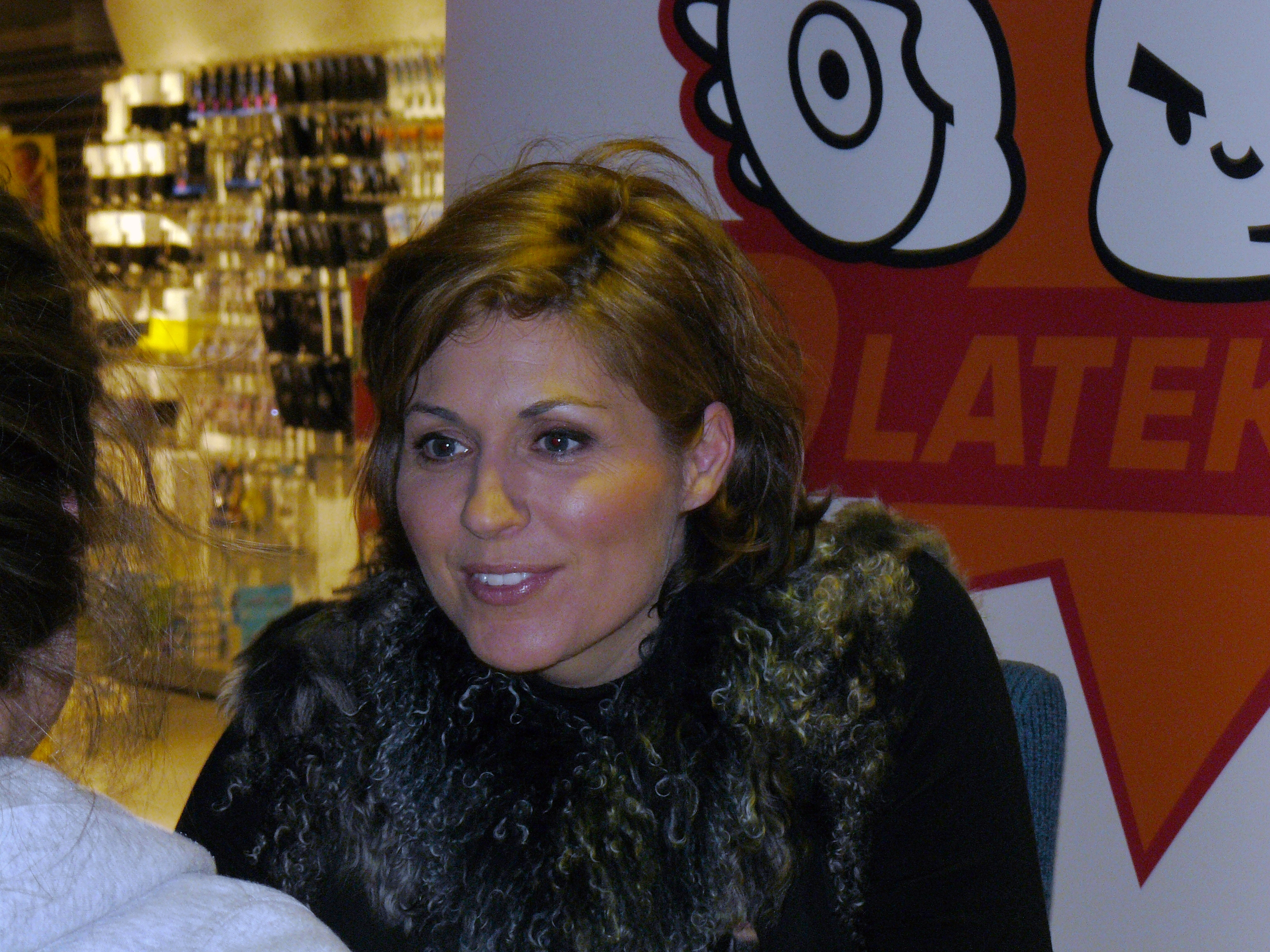
Sissel at an album signing in Norway 2010

In 2011, Sissel moved back to Norway after 22 years in Denmark. On 21 August 2011, Sissel performed the Norwegian hymn "Til ungdommen" (To the Youth), by Nordahl Grieg at the National Memorial Ceremony for the victims of the 22 July 2011 terrorist attacks. This ceremony took place in Oslo Spektrum and was broadcast live in all the Nordic countries. HM King Harald and HM Queen Sonja of Norway attended this ceremony with members from all the Nordic Royal Houses; the prime ministers of Norway, Sweden, and Denmark; and the presidents of Iceland and Finland. In September, Sissel got her own stamp in Norway when a set of stamps of four Norwegian female performers was issued.

In December 2012, Sissel performed exclusively in two free Christmas concerts in St John's Church, Bergen. This was the first time she performed a Christmas concert on her own in that church.

In November 2013, Sissel officially returned to the stage after a three-year break. She appeared on the Norwegian talk show Lindmo, where she performed "My Tribute" by Andrae Crouch. She toured Norway in November and December for her Christmas concerts, with a new mix of Christmas and gospel songs, hiring three gospel singers from New York to back her up on these concerts.

On 17 May 2014, Sissel performed the Norwegian national anthem "Ja, vi elsker dette landet" (Yes, We Love This Land) and Grieg's "Våren" (Spring) on the Norwegian Constitution Day 2014 in Eidsvoll, Norway. Royal guests from Norway, Sweden, and Denmark attended this ceremony, which was broadcast live on television. Later, in September, Sissel performed with the Greek tenor Mario Frangoulis at a concert on 5 September at the Odeon of Herodes Atticus in Greece. This concert, Sing Me An Angel, was held to aid the non-profit organisation I Live For Me. Sissel and Frangoulis performed several duets, including "You Raise Me Up"; "Nights in White Satin"; "Smile"; and "What A Wonderful World". Sissel toured Norway and Sweden with her acclaimed Christmas concerts in November and December. In the fifth episode of Season 3 of American television political drama series The Newsroom, which aired in December, a recording of Sissel singing "Oh Shenandoah" was played over the death scene of Charlie Skinner (Sam Waterston).

External videos
- Sissel performing "My Heart Will Go On" on the premiere of Titanic 3D at Royal Albert Hall, March 27 2012, YouTube video
- Sissel performing "My Heart Will Go On" on the world premiere of Titanic Live at Royal Albert Hall, April 27 2015, YouTube video

In 2015, Sissel performed as vocal soloist at two Titanic Live concerts in Lucerne, Switzerland on 13 and 14 March, and later at the Royal Albert Hall, London on 27 April, where she performed the vocal lines of James Horner's orchestral score as well as the solo soprano for "My Heart Will Go On". A few weeks later Horner died when his single-engine Tucano aircraft crashed in the Los Padres National Forest, California. In December 2015, Sissel was as one of nine persons nominated for the 2016 Hall of Fame at Rockheim in Norway.

The beginning of 2016 saw Sissel performing at a television broadcast Royal Gala on 17 January, celebrating the 25th anniversary, or Silver Jubilee, of HM The King and HM The Queen of Norway's accession to the Norwegian throne. Sissel sang "For alltid" (Forever), written by Ole Paus. She toured Sweden in the fall from 14 to 31 October with her new concert, Songs of Love. In November and December, she toured Norway, Denmark and Iceland with her Christmas concert, Sissels Jul (Sissel's Christmas). In December, Sissel again was nominated for the 2017 Hall of Fame at Rockheim in Norway, and the 2014 PBS concert Sing Me An Angel with Mario Frangoulis was broadcast on television in the US.

In February 2017, Sissel performed at a television broadcast celebration concert for her friend singer-songwriter Ole Paus in the Opera House in Oslo. And in November/December she toured Norway, Sweden, Denmark, and Iceland with her Christmas concert success, Sissels Jul.

In May 2019, Sissel released the first of 50 new songs that came out each week for the following 50 weeks. This new project, named Reflections celebrated Sissel turning 50 years old that year. On 6 June, she performed together with Italian singer Andrea Bocelli at a concert in Oslo. In July, she was again invited to perform with the Mormon Tabernacle Choir and the orchestra at Temple Square in their Pioneer Day concert, which was also broadcast on YouTube. In August, she made a special guest appearance on the popular Swedish television show Allsång på Skansen, where she performed two new songs, "Welcome to My World" and "Surrender".

== Personal life ==
From 1993 to 2004, Kyrkjebø was married to her first husband, Danish-American comedian and singer Eddie Skoller, in a church service described above. They have two daughters, Ingrid (born 1996) and Sarah (born 1999).

On 13 August 2013, Kyrkjebø married her second husband, Norwegian tax lawyer Ernst Ravnaas, in a private ceremony in Hov Church.

== Notable concerts and tours ==
Year	Concert/Tour Name	Country	Notes
1986	1986 Alpine Skiing World Cup	Norway	Sissel performed at the 1986 Alpine Skiing World Cup -show in Norway in February 1986.
1986	Eurovision Song Contest 1986	Norway	Sissel performed during the intermission of the Eurovision Song Contest 1986 in May 1986.
1989	Our Common Future	US	Sissel performed at Our Common Future, a five-hour global broadcast live from Avery Fisher Hall, New York in June 1989.
1990	Å gi er å se	Norway	Sissel opened the new concerthall in Oslo, Oslo Spektrum and performed at the Christmas-concert Å gi er å se in December 1990.
1991	Tíðin rennur Tour	Faroe Islands, Norway, Denmark	Sissel toured Faroe Islands, Norway and Denmark with her very successful church concert, Tíðin rennur.
1991	Julekonserten 1991	Norway	Christmas concert with Sissel and other artists touring in Norway.
1992	1992 Winter Olympics in Alberille		Sissel performed at the closing ceremony of the 1992 Winter Olympics in Alberille, in February 1992.
1992	Expo '92	Spain	Sissel performed at Expo '92 in Seville, Spain in September 1992.
1992	Neil Sedaka Tour	Norway	Sissel joined Neil Sedaka at his autumn tour in Norway in 1992.
1992	Julekonserten 1992	Norway	Christmas concert with Sissel and other artists touring in Norway.
1993	Julekonserten 1993	Norway	Christmas concert with Sissel and other artists touring in Norway.
1994	1994 Winter Olympics in Lillehammer	Norway	Sissel performed at the opening- and closing-ceremony of the 1994 Winter Olympics in Lillehammer, Norway in February 1994.
1994	Julekonserten 1994	Norway	Christmas concert with Sissel and other artists touring in Norway.
1994	Christmas in Vienna	Austria	On 22 December Sissel performed at the third Christmas in Vienna-concert in Austria, with Placido Domingo and Charles Aznavour.
1995	Live For Peace – Royal Gala 1995	United Kingdom	Sissel performed in front of Charles, Prince of Wales on the 1995 Live For Peace – Royal Gala, to mark the 50th anniversary of V.E. Day, in London Coliseum, London.
1995	Opera Gala	Denmark	Sissel performed with José Carreras and Ilona Tokody at an Opera Gala in Aarhus, Denmark on 23 July 1995.
1995	Julekonserten 1995	Norway	Christmas concert with Sissel and other artists touring in Norway.
1996	Sigulda Opera Festival	Laia	Sissel performed at the Sigulda Opera Festival, Laia in the summer of 1996.
1996	Julekonserten 1996	Norway	Christmas concert with Sissel and other artists touring in Norway.
1997	Tour with The Chieftains	US	Sissel toured the US with the Irish group The Chieftains.
1997	Good Morning America	Norway/US	Sissel made a special guest appearance and performance in the American television show Good Morning America when the show visited Bergen, Norway on 13 May 1997.
1997	Julekonserten 1997	Norway	Christmas concert with Sissel and other artists touring in Norway.
1998	Titanic-concert	US	Sissel performed in two Titanic concerts in Hollywood on 9 and 10 October.
1998	Julekonserten 1998	Norway, Sweden, Denmark	Christmas concert with Sissel and other artists touring in Norway, Sweden, and Denmark.
1999	Julekonserten 1999	Norway, Sweden, Denmark	Christmas concert with Sissel and other artists touring in Norway, Sweden, and Denmark.
2000	Nobel Peace Prize Concert	Norway	Sissel represented Norway at the annual Nobel Peace Prize Concert in December 2000.
2001	Sissel in Symphony	Norway	Sissel toured Norway with Kringkastingsorkestret. A recording of one of these concerts, in Drammen, was released on CD in 2001 and later on DVD in 2005.
2002	Royal wedding in Norway	Norway	Sissel performed at the royal wedding of the Norwegian princess, Princess Märtha Louise and Ari Behn, in the Nidaros Cathedral, Trondheim in May 2002.
2002	José Carreras Gala 2002	Germany	Sissel performed "Ave Maria" with Plácido Domingo on the German television show José Carreras Gala 2002 in Leipzig, Germany in December 2002.
2002	Good Morning America	US	Sissel performed "Ave Maria" with Plácido Domingo in the American television show Good Morning America in New York in December (October) 2002.
2002	Nobel Peace Prize Concert	Norway	In December 2002 Sissel again represented Norway at the annual Nobel Peace Prize Concert. She performed "The Prayer" with Josh Groban and "Over the Rainbow" as a solo.
2002	All Good Things – Sissel in Concert	Norway	Concert with Sissel that was filmed at the Oslo Spektrum and later broadcast in March 2003 on PBS in the US. A DVD of this concert was released in 2003.
2002	Christmas in Moscow	Russia	Sissel performed at a Christmas concert in Moscow in December 2002 with José Carreras, Plácido Domingo and Emma Shapplin.
2003	Sissel Tour	US	Mini-tour with Sissel in the US, visiting Philadelphia, St. Louis, and New York City.
2004	Lord of the Rings Symphony Tour	US, Europe	Sissel went on tour in the US and Europe with Howard Shore and the Lord of the Rings Symphony in the summer and fall of 2004.
2005	Music and the Spoken Word	US	Sissel performed with the Mormon Tabernacle Choir onits radio and broadcast Music and the Spoken Word from Salt Lake City in May 2005.
2005	Ninna-ji Otobutai	Japan	Sissel was invited to perform at the well-known annual temple-concert, Ninna-ji Otobutai in Japan in October 2005.
2006	Nordisk Vinternatt Tour	Sweden, Denmark, Norway	Sissel toured Scandinavia with her Scandinavian album-release Nordisk Vinternatt.
2006	Into Paradise Tour	US	Sissel toured the US with her album release Into Paradise.
2006	Christmas Concert with the Mormon Tabernacle Choir	US	Sissel was the featured soloist for the Mormon Tabernacle Choir's annual Christmas concerts on four performances in Salt Lake City, US.
2006	2006 European Athletics Championships	Sweden	Sissel performed two songs at the opening ceremony of the 2006 European Athletics Championships in Gothenburg, Sweden.
2008	Northern Lights Tour	US	Sissel toured eight cities in the US in February 2008 with her album release Northern Lights.
2008	Northern Lights Tour	US	Tour with Sissel that covered more cities in the central and southern United States in April 2008.
2009	Strålande Jul Christmas Tour	Norway	Sissel and Odd Nordstoga toured Norway with their album-release Strålande Jul.
2010	Expo 2010	China	Sissel performed at Expo 2010 in Shanghai, China with the Trondheim Soloists in May 2010.
2010	Til deg Tour	Norway, Sweden	Sissel toured Norway and Sweden with her album-release Til deg.
2011	Concert in Hareidsstemna	Norway	Concert with Sissel in connection of the 50th anniversary of Hareidsstemna in Hareid on 21 October.
2012	Titanic 3D World Premiere Concert	United Kingdom	Sissel performed with James Horner on the Titanic 3D World Premiere Concert at the Royal Albert Hall, London on 27 March.
2012	Concert in Istanbul	Turkey	Sissel performed at a concert in Istanbul, Turkey in November 2012.
2012	Frostrosir Klassik 2012	Iceland	Sissel performed at the Frostrosir Klassik concert in Reykjavík, Iceland in December 2012.
2013	Sissels Jul	Norway	Sissel toured Norway with her Christmas concert Sissels Jul.
2014	Sissel in Ziir	Norway	Concert with Sissel in Røros Church as a part of Vinterfestspillene 2014.
2014	Summer Concert	Norway	Sissel performed two concerts in Baroniet Rosendal on 16 July.
2014	Sing Me An Angel	Greece	Sissel performed with the Greek tenor Mario Frangoulis at the Odeon of Herodes Atticus in Greece on 5 September. This concert was broadcast on television in the US in December 2016.
2014	Sissels Jul	Norway, Sweden	Sissel toured Norway and Sweden with her Christmas concert Sissels Jul.
2015	Titanic Live – The Event	Switzerland, United Kingdom	Sissel performed as vocal soloist on four Titanic Live-concerts in Lucerne, Switzerland and the Royal Albert Hall, London.
2015	Sissels Jul	Norway, Sweden	Sissel toured Norway and Sweden with her Christmas concert Sissels Jul.
2016	Kongepar i 25 år – Royal Gala	Norway	Sissel performed at a television broadcast Royal Gala on 17 January, to celebrate the 25th anniversary or silver jubilee of HM The King and HM The Queen of Norway's accession to the Norwegian throne.
2016	Songs of Love	Sweden	Sissel toured Sweden with her new concert Songs of Love.
2016	Sissels Jul	Norway, Denmark, Iceland	Sissel toured Norway, Denmark, and Iceland with her Christmas concert Sissels Jul.
2017	Sissels Jul	Norway, Sweden, Denmark, Iceland	Sissel toured Norway, Sweden, Denmark, and Iceland with her Christmas concert Sissels Jul.
2018	Sissels Jul	Norway, Sweden, Denmark, Iceland	Sissel toured Norway, Sweden, Denmark, and Iceland with her Christmas concert Sissels Jul.
2019	Concert with Andrea Bocelli	Norway	Sissel and Andrea Bocelli performed together for the first time in Oslo in June.
2019	2019 Pioneer Day Concert with the Mormon Tabernacle Choir	US	Sissel was again invited to perform with the Mormon Tabernacle Choir and the orchestra at Temple Square in July.
2019	Allsång på Skansen	Sweden	Sissel guested the popular Swedish television show Allsång på Skansen, on which she performed two new songs, in August.
2019	Sissels Jul	Norway, Sweden, Denmark, Iceland, Germany	

== Awards and recognition ==
- 1986 – Årets Spellemann (Spellemann of the Year) in the Spellemannprisen.
- 1986 – Årets navn (Person of the Year) by Norwegian national newspaper Dagbladet.
- 1986 – På gang-scholarship from Norwegian national newspaper VG, with Åge Aleksandersen
- 1990 – Ansgarskolens Mediapris (Ansgarschool's Mediaprize), with Oslo Gospel Choir for the 1990 album Oslo Gospel Choir Live
- 1992 – Klods Hans Prisen
- 1993 – Gledespiken-prisen
- 1995 – Paul Harris Fellow by Rotary International
- 2002 – Ranked Scandinavia's Mostselling Artist with a total of 460,000 records sold in 18 months, for the albums In Symphony and Sissel
- 2005 – UNICEF Goodwill Ambassador
- 2005 – Knight of the 1st Class in the Order of St. Olav. On 8 October 2005, the King of Norway knighted Sissel for her contributions to music and as an ambassador for Norway. She was the youngest-ever recipient of this honor.
- 2006 – Juryens hederspris (Most Distinguished Artist—akin to a lifetime achievement award) in Spellemannprisen 2006. She was the youngest Norwegian performer ever to receive this award.
- 2007 – Topp 10 – Beste kvinnelige artist Sissel was awarded Best Female Artist of Norway by the Norwegian public broadcasting company NRK in the television program Topp 10 on 17 March 2007.
- 2009 – A rose developed by Poulsen Roses is named after Sissel and she baptized the rose in Baroniet Rosendal on 4 August 2009.
- 2010 – In February 2010 Sissel was nominated for the 40th Peer Gynt Award, which went to Dissimilis.
- 2011 – On 16 September 2011, a set of stamps of four Norwegian female performers (Sissel Kyrkjebø, Wenche Myhre, Mari Boine and Inger Lise Rypdal) was issued.
- 2011 – Rolf Gammleng-prisen (Open category)
- 2015 – In December 2015, Sissel was nominated for the first time for the Rockheim Hall of Fame 2016.
- 2016 – In December 2016, Sissel was nominated for the second time for the Rockheim Hall of Fame 2017.
- 2018 – In December 2018 Sissel was nominated for the third time for the Rockheim Hall of Fame 2019.

Awards
Preceded by	Recipient of Årets navn Dagbladet; 1986	Succeeded by
Preceded by A-ha	Recipient of Årets spellemann Spellemannprisen; 1986	Succeeded by Jørn Hoel
Preceded by Terje Rypdal	Recipient of Juryens hederspris Spellemannprisen; 2006	Succeeded by DumDum Boys
Preceded by Alfred Janson	Recipient of the Open class Gammleng-prisen; 2011	Succeeded by Susanna Wallumrød

== See also ==
- Sissel & Odd

Awards
Preceded by Alfred Janson	Recipient of the Open class Gammleng-prisen; 2011	Succeeded by Susanna Wallumrød
