= List of number-one songs in Norway =

This list shows the songs which have been number one on the official chart list (VG-lista) in Norway. The single list started in 1958, and the albums list in 1967. The show is broadcast every Wednesday by NRK P3, one of Norwegian Broadcasting Corporation's three nationwide analogue radio channels.

This page shows all the number-ones from 1995 to 2019. For earlier lists, see pages for 1958, 1959, 1960, 1961, 1962, 1963 and 1964 to 1994. For after 2020, see List of number-one singles of the 2020s (Norway).

== 1995–2008 ==
List of number-one singles in Norway, showing single title, date of reaching number one, weeks spent there and references
Artist	Single	Reached number one	Weeks at number one	Ref.(s)
Rednex	"Cotton Eye Joe"	10 October 1994	15	
Rednex	"Old Pop in an Oak"	15 January 1995	6	
Scatman John	"Scatman (Ski Ba Bop Ba Dop Bop)"	27 February 1995	1	
Celine Dion	"Think Twice"	6 March 1995	2	
Scatman John	"Scatman (Ski Ba Bop Ba Dop Bop)"	20 March 1995	1	
Celine Dion	"Think Twice"	27 March 1995	2	
The Offspring	"Self Esteem"	10 April 1995	4	
Rednex	"Wish You Were Here"	8 May 1995	2	
Take That	"Back for Good"	22 May 1995	1	
The Connells	"'74–'75"	29 May 1995	9	
The Murmurs	"You Suck"	31 July 1995	1	
U2	"Hold Me, Thrill Me, Kiss Me, Kill Me"	7 August 1995	1	
Morten Harket	"A Kind of Christmas Card"	14 August 1995	9	
Coolio featuring L.V.	"Gangsta's Paradise"	16 October 1995	14	
George Michael	"Jesus to a Child"	15 January 1996	1	
Babylon Zoo	"Spaceman"	22 January 1996	7	
Savoy	"Velvet"	11 March 1996	2	
The Prodigy	"Firestarter"	25 March 1996	3	
Robert Miles	"Children"	15 April 1996	5	
Fools Garden	"Lemon Tree"	20 May 1996	4	
Fugees	"Killing Me Softly"	17 June 1996	6	
Bjelleklang	"Gud! Hvor du er deilig"	29 July 1996	4	
Spice Girls	"Wannabe"	26 August 1996	5	
Faithless	"Insomnia"	30 September 1996	4	
The Kelly Family	"I Can't Help Myself (I Love You, I Want You)"	28 October 1996	3	
The Prodigy	"Breathe"	18 November 1996	1	
The Kelly Family	"I Can't Help Myself (I Love You, I Want You)"	25 November 1996	4	
No Doubt	"Don't Speak"	23 December 1996	7	
U2	"Discotheque"	10 February 1997	1	
No Doubt	"Don't Speak"	17 February 1997	1	
En Vogue	"Don't Let Go (Love)"	24 February 1997	6	
B-Real, Coolio, Method Man, LL Cool J and Busta Rhymes	"Hit 'Em High (The Monstars' Anthem)"	7 April 1997	1	
Espen Lind	"When Susannah Cries"	14 April 1997	6	
Aqua	"Barbie Girl"	26 May 1997	2	
Paradisio	"Bailando"	9 June 1997	5	
Puff Daddy and Faith Evans featuring 112	"I'll Be Missing You"	14 July 1997	10	
Elton John	"Something About the Way You Look Tonight" / "Candle in the Wind 1997"	22 September 1997	5	
The Rapsody featuring Warren G and Sissel	"Prince Igor"	3 November 1997	7	
Various artists	"Perfect Day"	22 December 1997	7	
Run–D.M.C. vs. Jason Nevins	"It's Like That"	9 February 1998	4	
Celine Dion	"My Heart Will Go On"	9 March 1998	10	
Drömhus	"Vill ha dig"	18 May 1998	5	
Pras featuring Ol' Dirty Bastard and Mýa	"Ghetto Supastar"	22 June 1998	7	
Aerosmith	"I Don't Want to Miss a Thing"	10 August 1998	4	
Boyzone	"No Matter What"	7 September 1998	6	
Lene Marlin	"Unforgivable Sinner"	19 October 1998	4	
Emilia	"Big Big World"	16 November 1998	3	
Cher	"Believe"	7 December 1998	6	
The Offspring	"Pretty Fly (For a White Guy)"	17 January 1999	5	
Britney Spears	"...Baby One More Time"	22 February 1999	8	
2Pac	"Changes"	19 April 1999	2	
Backstreet Boys	"I Want It That Way"	3 May 1999	2	
Vengaboys	"Boom, Boom, Boom, Boom"	17 May 1999	2	
Shania Twain	"That Don't Impress Me Much"	31 May 1999	1	
Multicyde featuring Anèa	"Not for the Dough"	7 June 1999	4	
Lou Bega	"Mambo No. 5 (A Little Bit Of...)"	5 July 1999	8	
Eiffel 65	"Blue (Da Ba Dee)"	30 August 1999	4	
Westlife	"If I Let You Go"	27 September 1999	3	
Christina Aguilera	"Genie in a Bottle"	18 October 1999	2	
Blümchen	"Heut' ist Mein Tag"	1 November 1999	4	
Bloodhound Gang	"The Bad Touch"	29 November 1999	2	
Boyzvoice	"Let Me Be Your Father X-Mas"	13 December 1999	6	
Alice DeeJay	"Back in My Life"	17 January 2000	1	
Motorpsycho	"The Other Fool"	24 January 2000	1	
Alice DeeJay	"Back in My Life"	31 January 2000	1	
Aqua	"Cartoon Heroes"	7 February 2000	2	
Bomfunk MC's	"Freestyler"	21 February 2000	2	
Madonna	"American Pie"	6 March 2000	4	
a-ha	"Summer Moved On"	3 April 2000	1	
Madonna	"American Pie"	10 April 2000	1	
Melanie C featuring Lisa "Left-Eye" Lopes	"Never Be the Same Again"	17 April 2000	2	
Britney Spears	"Oops!... I Did It Again"	1 May 2000	4	
DJ Aligator Project	"The Whistle Song"	29 May 2000	1	
Sonique	"It Feels So Good"	5 June 2000	1	
Racer	"Bønda fra nord 2000"	12 June 2000	2	
Sonique	"It Feels So Good"	26 June 2000	4	
Darude	"Sandstorm"	24 July 2000	5	
Madonna	"Music"	27 August 2000	4	
A1	"Take On Me"	25 September 2000	3	
U2	"Beautiful Day"	16 October 2000	2	
Backstreet Boys	"Shape of My Heart"	30 October 2000	3	
A1	"Same Old Brand New You"	20 November 2000	5	
Christian Strand	"Maybe Baby"	25 December 2000	1	
Wyclef Jean featuring Mary J. Blige	"911"	1 January 2001	6	
Outkast	"Ms. Jackson"	5 February 2001	3	
Madrugada	"Hands Up – I Love You"	26 February 2001	2	
Organic	"Big Brother"	12 March 2001	4	
Cape	"Tic Tac"	9 April 2001	1	
Destiny's Child	"Survivor"	16 April 2001	2	
Crazy Town	"Butterfly"	30 April 2001	6	
Spin-Up	"Sing Na Na Na"	11 June 2001	1	
Shaggy featuring Rayvon	"Angel"	18 June 2001	2	
Daddy DJ	"Daddy DJ"	2 July 2001	2	
Shaggy featuring Rayvon	"Angel"	16 July 2001	2	
Christina Aguilera, Lil' Kim, Mýa and Pink	"Lady Marmalade"	30 July 2001	5	
Eve featuring Gwen Stefani	"Let Me Blow Ya Mind"	3 September 2001	4	
Kylie Minogue	"Can't Get You Out of My Head"	1 October 2001	8	
Afroman	"Because I Got High"	26 November 2001	2	
Anastacia	"Paid My Dues"	10 December 2001	7	
Scooter	"Ramp! (The Logical Song)"	21 January 2002	2	
Shakira	"Whenever, Wherever"	4 February 2002	10	
a-ha	"Forever Not Yours"	15 April 2002	3	
Shakira	"Whenever, Wherever"	6 May 2002	1	
Ronan Keating	"If Tomorrow Never Comes"	13 May 2002	2	
Eminem	"Without Me"	27 May 2002	3	
Elvis Presley vs. JXL	"A Little Less Conversation"	17 June 2002	11	
Avril Lavigne	"Complicated"	2 September 2002	4	
Las Ketchup	"The Ketchup Song (Aserejé)"	30 September 2002	15	
Eminem	"Lose Yourself"	6 January 2003	4	
Big Brovaz	"Nu Flow"	3 February 2003	5	
Maria Arredondo featuring Christian Ingebrigtsen	"In Love with an Angel"	10 March 2003	2	
Anne Lingan	"Kicking You Out"	24 March 2003	5	
Gareth Gates	"Anyone of Us (Stupid Mistake)"	28 April 2003	1	
Dina	"Bli hos meg"	5 May 2003	3	
Christian Ingebrigtsen	"Things Are Gonna Change"	26 May 2003	2	
Kurt Nilsen	"She's So High"	9 June 2003	8	
Gaute Ormåsen	"Chasing Rainbows"	4 August 2003	1	
David	"Wild at Heart"	11 August 2003	5	
Lene Marlin	"You Weren't There"	15 September 2003	2	
David Pedersen	"Wild at Heart"	29 September 2003	1	
The Black Eyed Peas	"Where Is the Love?"	6 October 2003	1	
David Pedersen	"Wild at Heart"	13 October 2003	1	
The Black Eyed Peas	"Where Is the Love?"	20 October 2003	1	
Dido	"White Flag"	27 October 2003	1	
The Black Eyed Peas	"Where Is the Love?"	3 November 2003	2	
Outkast	"Hey Ya!"	17 November 2003	7	
The Black Eyed Peas	"Shut Up"	5 January 2004	7	
Britney Spears	"Toxic"	23 February 2004	3	
Usher featuring Lil Jon and Ludacris	"Yeah!"	15 March 2004	6	
D12	"My Band"	26 April 2004	1	
Eamon	"Fuck It (I Don't Want You Back)"	3 May 2004	1	
Usher featuring Lil Jon and Ludacris	"Yeah!"	10 May 2004	1	
Jim Stärk	"Morning Songs"	17 May 2004	1	
Eamon	"Fuck It (I Don't Want You Back)"	24 May 2004	1	
Kjartan Salvesen	"Standing Tall"	31 May 2004	4	
O-Zone	"Dragostea Din Tei"	28 June 2004	9	
O-Zone	"Despre tine"	30 August 2004	8	
Bertine Zetlitz	"Fake Your Beauty"	25 October 2004	1	
Brian McFadden	"Real to Me"	1 November 2004	1	
Britney Spears	"My Prerogative"	8 November 2004	1	
Eric Prydz	"Call on Me"	15 November 2004	3	
Band Aid 20	"Do They Know It's Christmas?"	6 December 2004	4	
Eric Prydz	"Call on Me"	3 January 2005	2	
Espen Lind	"Unloved"	17 January 2005	2	
Philip and Sandra	"Sommerflørt"	31 January 2005	3	
Kent	"Max 500"	21 February 2005	1	
Philip and Sandra	"Sommerflørt"	28 February 2005	2	
Alek	"Eneste for meg"	14 March 2005	1	
Wig Wam	"In My Dreams"	21 March 2005	3	
Schnappi	"Schnappi, das kleine Krokodil"	11 April 2005	7	
Jorun Stiansen	"This is the Night"	30 May 2005	5	
Crazy Frog	"Axel F"	4 July 2005	2	
Ravi & DJ Løv and The Monroes	"Tsjeriåu"	18 July 2005	1	
Crazy Frog	"Axel F"	25 July 2005	3	
Ravi & DJ Løv and The Monroes	"Tsjeriåu"	15 August 2005	1	
Crazy Frog	"Axel F"	22 August 2005	1	
Amy Diamond	"What's in It for Me"	29 August 2005	1	
Venke Knutson	"Just a Minute"	5 September 2005	1	
Amy Diamond	"What's in it for Me"	12 September 2005	1	
James Blunt	"You're Beautiful"	19 September 2005	1	
Alejandro Fuentes	"Stars"	26 September 2005	3	
a-ha	"Celice"	17 October 2005	1	
The Pussycat Dolls featuring Busta Rhymes	"Don't Cha"	24 October 2005	3	
Madonna	"Hung Up"	14 November 2005	4	
Madrugada featuring Ane Brun	"Lift Me"	12 December 2005	6	
Madonna	"Hung Up"	23 January 2006	1	
DumDum Boys	"Enhjørning"	30 January 2006	3	
Marit Larsen	"Don't Save Me"	20 February 2006	5	
Grandiosa	"Respekt for Grandiosa"	27 March 2006	8	
Mary J. Blige and U2	"One"	22 May 2006	1	
Aleksander Denstad With	"A Little Too Perfect"	29 May 2006	4	
Ravi	"Ås to i Osjlo"	26 June 2006	1	
Aleksander Denstad With	"A Little Too Perfect"	3 July 2006	1	
Mary J. Blige and U2	"One"	10 July 2006	1	
Ravi	"Neste såmr"	17 July 2006	4	
Mary J. Blige and U2	"One"	14 August 2006	4	
Justin Timberlake	"SexyBack"	11 September 2006	1	
Scissor Sisters	"I Don't Feel Like Dancin'"	18 September 2006	5	
Meat Loaf featuring Marion Raven	"It's All Coming Back to Me Now"	23 October 2006	2	
Bjørn Eidsvåg	"Floden"	6 November 2006	1	
U2 and Green Day	"The Saints Are Coming"	13 November 2006	1	
Meat Loaf featuring Marion Raven	"It's All Coming Back to Me Now"	20 November 2006	3	
Mia Gundersen	"Jordbarnas fremtid"	11 December 2006	1	
Meat Loaf featuring Marion Raven	"It's All Coming Back to Me Now"	18 December 2006	1	
Bjørn Eidsvåg	"Floden"	8 January 2007	2	
Espen Lind, Kurt Nilsen, Alejandro Fuentes and Askil Holm	"Hallelujah"	15 January 2007	1	
Akon featuring Eminem	"Smack That"	22 January 2007	2	
William Hut	"Take It Easy"	29 January 2007	1	
Amy Winehouse	"Rehab"	5 February 2007	5	
Nelly Furtado	"All Good Things (Come to an End)"	12 March 2007	1	
Mika	"Grace Kelly"	19 March 2007	1	
Grandiosa	"Full pakke"	26 March 2007	2	
Mika	"Grace Kelly"	19 March 2007	8	
Rihanna featuring Jay-Z	"Umbrella"	4 June 2007	4	
Kurt Nilsen	"Push Push"	2 July 2007	2	
Rihanna featuring Jay-Z	"Umbrella"	21 July 2007	3	
Sichelle	"Fuck deg"	6 August 2007	3	
Timbaland featuring Keri Hilson and D.O.E.	"The Way I Are"	27 August 2007	2	
Fergie	"Big Girls Don't Cry"	10 September 2007	3	
Alejandro Fuentes	"Hell If I"	30 September 2007	5	
Madcon	"Beggin'"	5 November 2007	7	
Glenn Lyse	"Days Go By"	24 December 2007	1	
Madcon	"Beggin'"	31 December 2007	5	
Leona Lewis	"Bleeding Love"	4 February 2008	2	
Maria Haukaas Storeng	"Hold On Be Strong"	18 February 2008	1	
R.E.M.	"Supernatural Superserious"	25 February 2008	2	
Adele	"Chasing Pavements"	10 March 2008	2	
Madonna featuring Justin Timberlake	"4 Minutes"	24 March 2008	3	
Duffy	"Mercy"	14 April 2008	3	
Kurt Nilsen	"Lost Highway"	5 May 2008	1	
Madonna featuring Justin Timberlake	"4 Minutes"	12 May 2008	1	
Espen Lind	"Scared of Heights"	19 May 2008	1	
Erlend Bratland	"Lost"	26 May 2008	6	
Jason Mraz	"I'm Yours"	7 July 2008	6	
Marit Larsen	"If a Song Could Get Me You"	18 August 2008	2	
Metallica	"The Day That Never Comes"	1 September 2008	1	
MGMT	"Kids"	8 September 2008	1	
Katy Perry	"I Kissed a Girl"	15 September 2008	1	
Gabriella Cilmi	"Sweet About Me"	22 September 2008	1	
Erlend Bratland	"Still Water"	29 September 2008	2	
The Killers	"Human"	13 October 2008	1	
Britney Spears	"Womanizer"	20 October 2008	2	
Beyoncé	"If I Were a Boy"	3 November 2008	2	
Guns N' Roses	"Chinese Democracy"	17 November 2008	1	
Beyoncé	"If I Were a Boy"	24 November 2008	2	
The BlackSheeps	"Oro jaska, beana"	8 December 2008	1	
Beyoncé	"If I Were a Boy"	15 December 2008	3	

== 2009 ==
Week	Publ. date	Artist(s)	Song title
1	5 January 2009	Katy Perry	"Hot n Cold"
2	12 January 2009	Lady Gaga	"Poker Face"
3	19 January 2009	Lady Gaga	"Poker Face"
4	26 January 2009	Lady Gaga	"Poker Face"
5	2 February 2009	Lady Gaga	"Poker Face"
6	9 February 2009	Lady Gaga	"Poker Face"
7	16 February 2009	Alexander Rybak	"Fairytale"
8	23 February 2009	Alexander Rybak	"Fairytale"
9	2 March 2009	Alexander Rybak	"Fairytale"
10	9 March 2009	Alexander Rybak	"Fairytale"
11	16 March 2009	Alexander Rybak	"Fairytale"
12	23 March 2009	Alexander Rybak	"Fairytale"
13	30 March 2009	Alexander Rybak	"Fairytale"
14	6 April 2009	Alexander Rybak	"Fairytale"
15	13 April 2009	Espen Lind, Kurt Nilsen, Alejandro Fuentes and Askil Holm	"With or Without You"
16	20 April 2009	Espen Lind, Kurt Nilsen, Alejandro Fuentes and Askil Holm	"With or Without You"
17	27 April 2009	Beyoncé	"Halo"
18	4 May 2009	Paperboys	"Lonesome Traveler"
19	11 May 2009	Paperboys	"Lonesome Traveler"
20	18 May 2009	Alexander Rybak	"Fairytale"
21	25 May 2009	Alexander Rybak	"Fairytale"
22	1 June 2009	Alexander Rybak	"Funny Little World"
23	8 June 2009	Paperboys	"Lonesome Traveler"
27	29 June 2009	Donkeyboy	"Ambitions"
28	6 July 2009	Donkeyboy	"Ambitions"
29	13 July 2009	Donkeyboy	"Ambitions"
30	20 July 2009	Donkeyboy	"Ambitions"
31	27 July 2009	Donkeyboy	"Ambitions"
32	2 August 2009	Donkeyboy	"Ambitions"
33	9 August 2009	Donkeyboy	"Ambitions"
34	16 August 2009	Donkeyboy	"Ambitions"
35	23 August 2009	Donkeyboy	"Ambitions"
36	30 August 2009	Donkeyboy	"Ambitions"
37	6 September 2009	Donkeyboy	"Ambitions"
38	13 September 2009	Donkeyboy	"Ambitions"
39	21 September 2009	Donkeyboy	"Sometimes"
40	28 September 2009	Donkeyboy	"Sometimes"
41	5 October 2009	Donkeyboy	"Sometimes"
42	12 October 2009	Kent	"Töntarna"
43	19 October 2009	Donkeyboy	"Ambitions"
44	26 October 2009	Donkeyboy	"Sometimes"
45	2 November 2009	Donkeyboy	"Sometimes"
46	9 November 2009	Donkeyboy	"Sometimes"
47	16 November 2009	Rihanna	"Russian Roulette"
48	23 November 2009	Donkeyboy	"Sometimes"
49	30 November 2009	Donkeyboy	"Sometimes"
50	7 December 2009	Maria Solheim and Hans Erik Dyvik Husby	"Rom for alle"
51	14 December 2009	Maria Solheim and Hans Erik Dyvik Husby	"Rom for alle"
52	21 December 2009	Maria Solheim and Hans Erik Dyvik Husby	"Rom for alle"
53	28 December 2009	Chand Torsvik	"Diamanten"

== 2010 ==
Week	Publ. date	Artist(s)	Song title
1	4 January 2010	Ke$ha	"Tik Tok"
2	11 January 2010	Veronica Maggio	"Måndagsbarn"
3	18 January 2010	Lady Gaga	"Bad Romance"
4	25 January 2010	Rihanna	"Russian Roulette"
5	1 February 2010	Rihanna	"Russian Roulette"
6	8 January 2010	Bjørn Johan Muri	"Yes Man"
7	15 February 2010	Bjørn Johan Muri	"Yes Man"
8	22 February 2010	Artists for Haiti	"We Are the World 25 for Haiti"
9	1 March 2010	Bjørn Johan Muri	"Yes Man"
10	8 March 2010	Bjørn Johan Muri	"Yes Man"
11	15 March 2010	Bjørn Johan Muri	"Yes Man"
12	22 March 2010	Bjørn Johan Muri	"Yes Man"
13	29 March 2010	Lady Gaga featuring Beyoncé	"Telephone"
14	5 April 2010	Lady Gaga featuring Beyoncé	"Telephone"
15	12 April 2010	Cheryl Cole	"Fight for This Love"
16	19 April 2010	Cheryl Cole	"Fight for This Love"
17	26 April 2010	Cheryl Cole	"Fight for This Love"
18	3 May 2010	Edward Maya and Vika Jigulina	"Stereo Love"
19	10 May 2010	Edward Maya and Vika Jigulina	"Stereo Love"
20	17 May 2010	Edward Maya and Vika Jigulina	"Stereo Love"
21	24 May 2010	Edward Maya and Vika Jigulina	"Stereo Love"
22	31 May 2010	Lena Meyer-Landrut	"Satellite"
23	7 June 2010	Madcon	"Glow"
24	14 June 2010	Madcon	"Glow"
25	21 June 2010	Madcon	"Glow"
26	28 June 2010	Madcon	"Glow"
27	5 July 2010	Madcon	"Glow"
28	12 July 2010	Madcon	"Glow"
29	19 July 2010	Madcon	"Glow"
30	26 July 2010	Madcon	"Glow"
31	2 August 2010	Madcon	"Glow"
32	9 August 2010	Madcon	"Glow"
33	16 August 2010	Eminem featuring Rihanna	"Love the Way You Lie"
34	23 August 2010	Eminem featuring Rihanna	"Love the Way You Lie"
35	30 August 2010	Eminem featuring Rihanna	"Love the Way You Lie"
36	6 September 2010	Eminem featuring Rihanna	"Love the Way You Lie"
37	13 September 2010	Madcon featuring Ameerah	"Freaky Like Me"
38	20 September 2010	Rihanna	"Only Girl (in the World)"
39	27 September 2010	Rihanna	"Only Girl (in the World)"
40	4 October 2010	Rihanna	"Only Girl (in the World)"
41	11 October 2010	Rihanna	"Only Girl (in the World)"
42	18 October 2010	Rihanna	"Only Girl (in the World)"
43	25 October 2010	Sivert Høyem	"Prisoner of the Road"
44	1 November 2010	Sivert Høyem	"Prisoner of the Road"
45	8 November 2010	Madcon featuring Ameerah	"Freaky Like Me"
46	15 November 2010	Madcon featuring Ameerah	"Freaky Like Me"
47	22 November 2010	Maria Mena	"Home for Christmas"
48	29 November 2010	Maria Mena	"Home for Christmas"
49	6 December 2010	Maria Mena	"Home for Christmas"
50	13 December 2010	Hans Bollandsås	"Moments"
51	20 December 2010	Hans Bollandsås	"Moments"
52	27 December 2010	Maria Mena	"Home for Christmas"

== 2011 ==
Week	Publ. date	Artist(s)	Song title
1	3 January 2011	Amy Macdonald	"This Is the Life"
2	10 January 2011	Duck Sauce	"Barbra Streisand"
3	17 January 2011	Bruno Mars	"Grenade"
4	24 January 2011	Bruno Mars	"Grenade"
5	31 January 2011	Bruno Mars	"Grenade"
6	7 February 2011	Stella Mwangi	"Haba Haba"
7	14 February 2011	Stella Mwangi	"Haba Haba"
8	21 February 2011	Stella Mwangi	"Haba Haba"
9	28 February 2011	Stella Mwangi	"Haba Haba"
10	7 March 2011	Alexis Jordan	"Happiness"
11	14 March 2011	Marit Larsen	"Vår beste dag"
12	21 March 2011	Jennifer Lopez featuring Pitbull	"On the Floor"
13	28 March 2011	Jennifer Lopez featuring Pitbull	"On the Floor"
14	4 April 2011	Jennifer Lopez featuring Pitbull	"On the Floor"
15	11 April 2011	Jennifer Lopez featuring Pitbull	"On the Floor"
16	18 April 2011	Jennifer Lopez featuring Pitbull	"On the Floor"
17	25 April 2011	Chris Medina	"What Are Words"
18	2 May 2011	Chris Medina	"What Are Words"
19	9 May 2011	Chris Medina	"What Are Words"
20	16 May 2011	Chris Medina	"What Are Words"
21	23 May 2011	Chris Medina	"What Are Words"
22	30 May 2011	Chris Medina	"What Are Words"
23	6 June 2011	Chris Medina	"What Are Words"
24	13 June 2011	Chris Medina	"What Are Words"
25	20 June 2011	Chris Medina	"What Are Words"
26	27 June 2011	Chris Medina	"What Are Words"
27	4 July 2011	Chris Medina	"What Are Words"
28	11 July 2011	Gabrielle	"Ring meg"
29	18 July 2011	Gabrielle	"Ring meg"
30	25 July 2011	Gabrielle	"Ring meg"
31	1 August 2011	Herborg Kråkevik	"Til Ungdommen"
32	8 August 2011	Gabrielle	"Ring meg"
33	15 August 2011	Gabrielle	"Ring meg"
34	22 August 2011	Gabrielle	"Ring meg"
35	29 August 2011	Gabrielle	"Ring meg"
36	5 September 2011	Maroon 5 featuring Christina Aguilera	"Moves Like Jagger"
37	12 September 2011	Maroon 5 featuring Christina Aguilera	"Moves Like Jagger"
38	19 September 2011	Maroon 5 featuring Christina Aguilera	"Moves Like Jagger"
39	26 September 2011	Maroon 5 featuring Christina Aguilera	"Moves Like Jagger"
40	3 October 2011	Rihanna featuring Calvin Harris	"We Found Love"
41	10 October 2011	Maroon 5 featuring Christina Aguilera	"Moves Like Jagger"
42	17 October 2011	Rihanna featuring Calvin Harris	"We Found Love"
43	24 October 2011	Rihanna featuring Calvin Harris	"We Found Love"
44	31 October 2011	Rihanna featuring Calvin Harris	"We Found Love"
45	7 November 2011	Rihanna featuring Calvin Harris	"We Found Love"
46	14 November 2011	Rihanna featuring Calvin Harris	"We Found Love"
47	21 November 2011	Rihanna featuring Calvin Harris	"We Found Love"
48	28 November 2011	Rihanna featuring Calvin Harris	"We Found Love"
49	5 December 2011	Rihanna featuring Calvin Harris	"We Found Love"
50	12 December 2011	Coldplay	"Paradise"
51	19 December 2011	Avicii	"Levels"
52	26 December 2011	Avicii	"Levels"

== 2012 ==
Week	Publ. date	Artist(s)	Song title
1	6 January 2012	Avicii	"Levels"
2	13 January 2012	Avicii	"Levels"
3	20 January 2012	Donkeyboy	"City Boy"
4	27 January 2012	Plumbo	"Møkkamann"
5	3 February 2012	Flo Rida featuring Sia	"Wild Ones"
6	10 February 2012	Vinni	"Sommerfuggel i vinterland"
7	17 February 2012	Vinni	"Sommerfuggel i vinterland"
8	24 February 2012	Vinni	"Sommerfuggel i vinterland"
9	2 March 2012	Vinni	"Sommerfuggel i vinterland"
10	9 March 2012	Vinni	"Sommerfuggel i vinterland"
11	16 March 2012	Vinni	"Sommerfuggel i vinterland"
12	23 March 2012	Vinni	"Sommerfuggel i vinterland"
13	30 March 2012	Laleh	"Some Die Young"
14	6 April 2012	Laleh	"Some Die Young"
15	13 April 2012	Laleh	"Some Die Young"
16	20 April 2012	Laleh	"Some Die Young"
17	27 April 2012	Laleh	"Some Die Young"
18	4 May 2012	Laleh	"Some Die Young"
19	11 May 2012	Laleh	"Some Die Young"
20	18 May 2012	Laleh	"Some Die Young"
21	25 May 2012	Flo Rida	"Whistle"
22	1 June 2012	Loreen	"Euphoria"
23	8 June 2012	Loreen	"Euphoria"
24	15 June 2012	Loreen	"Euphoria"
25	22 June 2012	Loreen	"Euphoria"
26	29 June 2012	Loreen	"Euphoria"
27	6 July 2012	Loreen	"Euphoria"
28	13 July 2012	Alina Devecerski	"Flytta på dej!"
29	20 July 2012	Alina Devecerski	"Flytta på dej!"
30	27 July 2012	Alina Devecerski	"Flytta på dej!"
31	3 August 2012	Alina Devecerski	"Flytta på dej!"
32	10 August 2012	Alina Devecerski	"Flytta på dej!"
33	17 August 2012	Alina Devecerski	"Flytta på dej!"
34	24 August 2012	Alina Devecerski	"Flytta på dej!"
35	31 August 2012	Flo Rida	"I Cry"
36	7 September 2012	Flo Rida	"I Cry"
37	14 September 2012	Flo Rida	"I Cry"
38	21 September 2012	will.i.am	"This Is Love"
39	28 September 2012	PSY	"Gangnam Style"
40	5 October 2012	PSY	"Gangnam Style"
41	12 October 2012	PSY	"Gangnam Style"
42	19 October 2012	PSY	"Gangnam Style"
43	26 October 2012	Rihanna	"Diamonds"
44	2 November 2012	Rihanna	"Diamonds"
45	9 November 2012	Rihanna	"Diamonds"
46	16 November 2012	Rihanna	"Diamonds"
47	23 November 2012	Rihanna	"Diamonds"
48	30 November 2012	Rihanna	"Diamonds"
49	7 December 2012	Rihanna	"Diamonds"
50	14 December 2012	Rihanna	"Diamonds"
51	21 December 2012	Rihanna	"Diamonds"
52	28 December 2012	Rihanna	"Diamonds"

== 2013 ==
Week	Publ. date	Artist(s)	Song title
1	4 January 2013	Rihanna	"Diamonds"
2	11 January 2013	will.i.am featuring Britney Spears	"Scream & Shout"
3	18 January 2013	will.i.am featuring Britney Spears	"Scream & Shout"
4	25 January 2013	will.i.am featuring Britney Spears	"Scream & Shout"
5	1 February 2013	will.i.am featuring Britney Spears	"Scream & Shout"
6	8 February 2013	Macklemore and Ryan Lewis featuring Wanz	"Thrift Shop"
7	15 February 2013	Macklemore and Ryan Lewis featuring Wanz	"Thrift Shop"
8	22 February 2013	Macklemore and Ryan Lewis featuring Wanz	"Thrift Shop"
9	1 March 2013	Macklemore and Ryan Lewis featuring Wanz	"Thrift Shop"
10	8 March 2013	Macklemore and Ryan Lewis featuring Wanz	"Thrift Shop"
11	15 March 2013	Macklemore and Ryan Lewis featuring Wanz	"Thrift Shop"
12	22 March 2013	Adelén	"Bombo"
13	29 March 2013	Adelén	"Bombo"
14	5 April 2013	Adelén	"Bombo"
15	12 April 2013	Zara Larsson	"Uncover"
16	19 April 2013	Zara Larsson	"Uncover"
17	26 April 2013	Zara Larsson	"Uncover"
18	3 May 2013	Passenger	"Let Her Go"
19	10 May 2013	Passenger	"Let Her Go"
20	17 May 2013	Passenger	"Let Her Go"
21	24 May 2013	Passenger	"Let Her Go"
22	31 May 2013	Passenger	"Let Her Go"
23	7 June 2013	DJ Broiler	"Vannski"
24	14 June 2013	DJ Broiler	"Vannski"
25	21 June 2013	DJ Broiler	"Vannski"
26	28 June 2013	DJ Broiler	"Vannski"
27	5 July 2013	Avicii	"Wake Me Up!"
28	12 July 2013	Avicii	"Wake Me Up!"
29	19 July 2013	Avicii	"Wake Me Up!"
30	26 July 2013	Avicii	"Wake Me Up!"
31	2 August 2013	Avicii	"Wake Me Up!"
32	9 August 2013	Avicii	"Wake Me Up!"
33	16 August 2013	Avicii	"Wake Me Up!"
34	23 August 2013	Avicii	"Wake Me Up!"
35	30 August 2013	Avicii	"Wake Me Up!"
36	6 September 2013	Avicii	"Wake Me Up!"
37	13 September 2013	Avicii	"Wake Me Up!"
38	20 September 2013	Ylvis	"The Fox"
39	27 September 2013	Ylvis	"The Fox"
40	4 October 2013	Ylvis	"The Fox"
41	11 October 2013	Ylvis	"The Fox"
42	18 October 2013	Avicii	"Hey Brother"
43	25 October 2013	Avicii	"Hey Brother"
44	1 November 2013	Avicii	"Hey Brother"
45	8 November 2013	Avicii	"Hey Brother"
46	15 November 2013	Eminem featuring Rihanna	"The Monster"
47	22 November 2013	Eminem featuring Rihanna	"The Monster"
48	29 November 2013	Eminem featuring Rihanna	"The Monster"
49	6 December 2013	Eminem featuring Rihanna	"The Monster"
50	13 December 2013	Eminem featuring Rihanna	"The Monster"
51	20 December 2013	Eminem featuring Rihanna	"The Monster"
52	27 December 2013	Eminem featuring Rihanna	"The Monster"

== 2014 ==
Week	Publ. date	Artist(s)	Song title
1	3 January 2014	Pitbull featuring Ke$ha	"Timber"
2	10 January 2014	Pitbull featuring Ke$ha	"Timber"
3	17 January 2014	Ed Sheeran	"I See Fire"
4	24 January 2014	Ed Sheeran	"I See Fire"
5	31 January 2014	Ed Sheeran	"I See Fire"
6	7 February 2014	Ed Sheeran	"I See Fire"
7	14 February 2014	Ed Sheeran	"I See Fire"
8	21 February 2014	Ed Sheeran	"I See Fire"
9	28 February 2014	Ed Sheeran	"I See Fire"
10	7 March 2014	Ed Sheeran	"I See Fire"
11	14 March 2014	Pharrell Williams	"Happy"
12	21 March 2014	Pharrell Williams	"Happy"
13	28 March 2014	Clean Bandit featuring Jess Glynne	"Rather Be"
14	4 April 2014	Mr. Probz	"Waves (Robin Schulz Remix)"
15	11 April 2014	Mr. Probz	"Waves (Robin Schulz Remix)"
16	18 April 2014	Mr. Probz	"Waves (Robin Schulz Remix)"
17	25 April 2014	Mr. Probz	"Waves (Robin Schulz Remix)"
18	2 May 2014	Mr. Probz	"Waves (Robin Schulz Remix)"
19	9 May 2014	Mr. Probz	"Waves (Robin Schulz Remix)"
20	16 May 2014	David Guetta and Showtek featuring Vassy	"Bad"
21	23 May 2014	David Guetta and Showtek featuring Vassy	"Bad"
22	30 May 2014	Seinabo Sey	"Younger (Kygo Remix)"
23	6 June 2014	Seinabo Sey	"Younger (Kygo Remix)"
24	13 June 2014	Seinabo Sey	"Younger (Kygo Remix)"
25	20 June 2014	Seinabo Sey	"Younger (Kygo Remix)"
26	27 June 2014	Seinabo Sey	"Younger (Kygo Remix)"
27	4 July 2014	Seinabo Sey	"Younger (Kygo Remix)"
28	11 July 2014	Seinabo Sey	"Younger (Kygo Remix)"
29	18 July 2014	Admiral P featuring Nico D	"Engel"
30	25 July 2014	Anders Nilsen	"Salsa Tequila"
31	2 August 2014	Anders Nilsen	"Salsa Tequila"
32	9 August 2014	Anders Nilsen	"Salsa Tequila"
33	16 August 2014	Lilly Wood & The Prick and Robin Schulz	"Prayer in C"
34	23 August 2014	Lilly Wood & The Prick and Robin Schulz	"Prayer in C"
35	30 August 2014	Lilly Wood & The Prick and Robin Schulz	"Prayer in C"
36	6 September 2014	Lilly Wood & The Prick and Robin Schulz	"Prayer in C"
37	13 September 2014	Lilly Wood & The Prick and Robin Schulz	"Prayer in C"
38	20 September 2014	Lilly Wood & The Prick and Robin Schulz	"Prayer in C"
39	27 September 2014	Calvin Harris featuring John Newman	"Blame"
40	4 October 2014	Calvin Harris featuring John Newman	"Blame"
41	11 October 2014	Gabriel Ríos	"Gold"
42	18 October 2014	Gabriel Ríos	"Gold"
43	25 October 2014	Gabriel Ríos	"Gold"
44	1 November 2014	Gabriel Ríos	"Gold"
45	8 November 2014	Gabriel Ríos	"Gold"
46	15 November 2014	David Guetta featuring Sam Martin	"Dangerous"
47	22 November 2014	David Guetta featuring Sam Martin	"Dangerous"
48	29 November 2014	Broiler featuring Ravvel	"Wild Eyes"
49	6 December 2014	Broiler featuring Ravvel	"Wild Eyes"
50	13 December 2014	Kygo featuring Conrad	"Firestone"
51	20 December 2014	Kygo featuring Conrad	"Firestone"
52	27 December 2014	Kygo featuring Conrad	"Firestone"

== 2015 ==
Week	Publ. date	Artist(s)	Song title
1	3 January 2015	Kygo featuring Conrad	"Firestone"
2	10 January 2015	Kygo featuring Conrad	"Firestone"
3	17 January 2015	Kygo featuring Conrad	"Firestone"
4	24 January 2015	Freddy Kalas	"Pinne for landet"
5	31 January 2015	Freddy Kalas	"Pinne for landet"
6	7 February 2015	Freddy Kalas	"Pinne for landet"
7	14 February 2015	Ellie Goulding	"Love Me Like You Do"
8	21 February 2015	Ellie Goulding	"Love Me Like You Do"
9	28 February 2015	Ellie Goulding	"Love Me Like You Do"
10	7 March 2015	Ellie Goulding	"Love Me Like You Do"
11	14 March 2015	Ellie Goulding	"Love Me Like You Do"
12	21 March 2015	Rihanna featuring Kanye West and Paul McCartney	"FourFiveSeconds"
13	28 March 2015	Kygo featuring Parson James	"Stole the Show"
14	4 April 2015	Kygo featuring Parson James	"Stole the Show"
15	11 April 2015	Kygo featuring Parson James	"Stole the Show"
16	18 April 2015	Wiz Khalifa featuring Charlie Puth	"See You Again"
17	25 April 2015	Wiz Khalifa featuring Charlie Puth	"See You Again"
18	2 May 2015	Wiz Khalifa featuring Charlie Puth	"See You Again"
19	9 May 2015	Wiz Khalifa featuring Charlie Puth	"See You Again"
20	16 May 2015	Wiz Khalifa featuring Charlie Puth	"See You Again"
21	23 May 2015	Kygo featuring Parson James	"Stole the Show"
22	30 May 2015	Kygo featuring Parson James	"Stole the Show"
23	6 June 2015	Kygo featuring Parson James	"Stole the Show"
24	13 June 2015	Avicii	"Waiting for Love"
25	20 June 2015	Avicii	"Waiting for Love"
26	27 June 2015	Morgan Sulele	"Bare min"
27	4 July 2015	Morgan Sulele	"Bare min"
28	11 July 2015	Morgan Sulele	"Bare min"
29	18 July 2015	Morgan Sulele	"Bare min"
30	25 July 2015	Morgan Sulele	"Bare min"
31	1 August 2015	Morgan Sulele	"Bare min"
32	8 August 2015	Kygo featuring Will Heard	"Nothing Left"
33	15 August 2015	Kygo featuring Will Heard	"Nothing Left"
34	22 August 2015	Kygo featuring Will Heard	"Nothing Left"
35	29 August 2015	Kygo featuring Will Heard	"Nothing Left"
36	4 September 2015	Justin Bieber	"What Do You Mean?"
37	11 September 2015	Justin Bieber	"What Do You Mean?"
38	18 September 2015	Justin Bieber	"What Do You Mean?"
39	25 September 2015	Justin Bieber	"What Do You Mean?"
40	2 October 2015	Justin Bieber	"What Do You Mean?"
41	9 October 2015	Mike Posner	"I Took a Pill in Ibiza" (SeeB Remix)
42	16 October 2015	Mike Posner	"I Took a Pill in Ibiza" (SeeB Remix)
43	23 October 2015	Mike Posner	"I Took a Pill in Ibiza" (SeeB Remix)
44	30 October 2015	Adele	"Hello"
45	6 November 2015	Adele	"Hello"
46	13 November 2015	Adele	"Hello"
47	20 November 2015	Adele	"Hello"
48	27 November 2015	Adele	"Hello"
49	4 December 2015	Adele	"Hello"
50	11 December 2015	Adele	"Hello"
51	18 December 2015	Alan Walker	"Faded"
52	25 December 2015	Alan Walker	"Faded"

== 2016 ==
Week	Publ. date	Artist(s)	Song title
53 (of 2015)	1 January	Alan Walker	"Faded"
1	8 January	Alan Walker	"Faded"
2	15 January	Alan Walker	"Faded"
3	22 January	Alan Walker	"Faded"
4	29 January	Alan Walker	"Faded"
5	5 February	Alan Walker	"Faded"
6	12 February	Alan Walker	"Faded"
7	19 February	Alan Walker	"Faded"
8	26 February	Alan Walker	"Faded"
9	4 March	Alan Walker	"Faded"
10	11 March	Alan Walker	"Faded"
11	18 March	Alan Walker	"Faded"
12	25 March	Kygo and Labrinth	"Fragile"
13	1 April	Kygo and Labrinth	"Fragile"
14	8 April	Kygo and Labrinth	"Fragile"
15	15 April	Kygo and Labrinth	"Fragile"
16	22 April	Kygo and Labrinth	"Fragile"
17	29 April	Galantis	"No Money"
18	6 May	Katastrofe	"Sangen du hater"
19	13 May	Katastrofe	"Sangen du hater"
20	20 May	Drake featuring Wizkid and Kyla	"One Dance"
21	27 May	Marcus & Martinus featuring Madcon	"Girls"
22	3 June	Freddy Kalas	"Jovial"
23	10 June	Freddy Kalas	"Jovial"
24	17 June	Alan Walker	"Sing Me to Sleep"
25	24 June	Alan Walker	"Sing Me to Sleep"
26	1 July	Alan Walker	"Sing Me to Sleep"
27	8 July	Alan Walker	"Sing Me to Sleep"
28	15 July	Julie Bergan	"Arigato"
29	22 July	Julie Bergan	"Arigato"
30	29 July	Major Lazer featuring Justin Bieber and MØ	"Cold Water"
31	5 August	Major Lazer featuring Justin Bieber and MØ	"Cold Water"
32	12 August	Major Lazer featuring Justin Bieber and MØ	"Cold Water"
33	19 August	Major Lazer featuring Justin Bieber and MØ	"Cold Water"
34	26 August	DJ Snake featuring Justin Bieber	"Let Me Love You"
35	2 September	DJ Snake featuring Justin Bieber	"Let Me Love You"
36	9 September	DJ Snake featuring Justin Bieber	"Let Me Love You"
37	16 September	The Chainsmokers featuring Halsey	"Closer"
38	23 September	The Chainsmokers featuring Halsey	"Closer"
39	30 September	The Chainsmokers featuring Halsey	"Closer"
40	7 October	The Weeknd featuring Daft Punk	"Starboy"
41	14 October	The Weeknd featuring Daft Punk	"Starboy"
42	21 October	The Weeknd featuring Daft Punk	"Starboy"
43	28 October	The Weeknd featuring Daft Punk	"Starboy"
44	4 November	The Weeknd featuring Daft Punk	"Starboy"
45	11 November	The Weeknd featuring Daft Punk	"Starboy"
46	18 November	The Weeknd featuring Daft Punk	"Starboy"
47	25 November	The Weeknd featuring Daft Punk	"Starboy"
48	2 December	The Weeknd featuring Daft Punk	"Starboy"
49	9 December	Alan Walker	"Alone"
50	16 December	Alan Walker	"Alone"
51	23 December	Alan Walker	"Alone"
52	30 December	Alan Walker	"Alone"

== 2017 ==
Week	Publ. date	Artist(s)	Song title
1	6 January	Alan Walker	"Alone"
2	13 January	Ed Sheeran	"Shape of You"
3	20 January	Ed Sheeran	"Shape of You"
4	27 January	Ed Sheeran	"Shape of You"
5	3 February	Ed Sheeran	"Shape of You"
6	10 February	Ed Sheeran	"Shape of You"
7	17 February	Ed Sheeran	"Shape of You"
8	24 February	Kygo and Selena Gomez	"It Ain't Me"
9	3 March	Kygo and Selena Gomez	"It Ain't Me"
10	10 March	Kygo and Selena Gomez	"It Ain't Me"
11	17 March	Kygo and Selena Gomez	"It Ain't Me"
12	24 March	Kygo and Selena Gomez	"It Ain't Me"
13	31 March	Kygo and Selena Gomez	"It Ain't Me"
14	7 April	Kygo and Selena Gomez	"It Ain't Me"
15	14 April	Kygo and Selena Gomez	"It Ain't Me"
16	21 April	Clean Bandit featuring Zara Larsson	"Symphony"
17	28 April	Temur and Hkeem	"Fy faen"
18	5 May	Luis Fonsi and Daddy Yankee featuring Justin Bieber	"Despacito (Remix)"
19	12 May	Luis Fonsi and Daddy Yankee featuring Justin Bieber	"Despacito (Remix)"
20	19 May	Luis Fonsi and Daddy Yankee featuring Justin Bieber	"Despacito (Remix)"
21	26 May	Luis Fonsi and Daddy Yankee featuring Justin Bieber	"Despacito (Remix)"
22	2 June	Luis Fonsi and Daddy Yankee featuring Justin Bieber	"Despacito (Remix)"
23	9 June	Luis Fonsi and Daddy Yankee featuring Justin Bieber	"Despacito (Remix)"
24	16 June	Luis Fonsi and Daddy Yankee featuring Justin Bieber	"Despacito (Remix)"
25	23 June	Luis Fonsi and Daddy Yankee featuring Justin Bieber	"Despacito (Remix)"
26	30 June	Luis Fonsi and Daddy Yankee featuring Justin Bieber	"Despacito (Remix)"
27	7 July	Luis Fonsi and Daddy Yankee featuring Justin Bieber	"Despacito (Remix)"
28	14 July	Luis Fonsi and Daddy Yankee featuring Justin Bieber	"Despacito (Remix)"
29	21 July	Luis Fonsi and Daddy Yankee featuring Justin Bieber	"Despacito (Remix)"
30	28 July	Luis Fonsi and Daddy Yankee featuring Justin Bieber	"Despacito (Remix)"
31	4 August	Luis Fonsi and Daddy Yankee featuring Justin Bieber	"Despacito (Remix)"
32	11 August	Luis Fonsi and Daddy Yankee featuring Justin Bieber	"Despacito (Remix)"
33	18 August	Luis Fonsi and Daddy Yankee featuring Justin Bieber	"Despacito (Remix)"
34	25 August	Justin Bieber and BloodPop	"Friends"
35	1 September	Astrid S	"Think Before I Talk"
36	8 September	Astrid S	"Think Before I Talk"
37	15 September	Astrid S	"Think Before I Talk"
38	22 September	Post Malone featuring 21 Savage	"Rockstar"
39	29 September	Post Malone featuring 21 Savage	"Rockstar"
40	6 October	Post Malone featuring 21 Savage	"Rockstar"
41	13 October	Post Malone featuring 21 Savage	"Rockstar"
42	20 October	Post Malone featuring 21 Savage	"Rockstar"
43	27 October	Post Malone featuring 21 Savage	"Rockstar"
44	3 November	Post Malone featuring 21 Savage	"Rockstar"
45	10 November	Post Malone featuring 21 Savage	"Rockstar"
46	17 November	Alan Walker featuring Noah Cyrus and Digital Farm Animals	"All Falls Down"
47	24 November	Alan Walker featuring Noah Cyrus and Digital Farm Animals	"All Falls Down"
48	1 December	Alan Walker featuring Noah Cyrus and Digital Farm Animals	"All Falls Down"
49	8 December	Alan Walker featuring Noah Cyrus and Digital Farm Animals	"All Falls Down"
50	15 December	Mariah Carey	"All I Want for Christmas Is You"
51	22 December	Eminem featuring Ed Sheeran	"River"
52	29 December	Maria Mena	"Home for Christmas"

== 2018 ==
Week	Publ. date	Artist(s)	Song title
1	5 January	Eminem featuring Ed Sheeran	"River"
2	12 January	Eminem featuring Ed Sheeran	"River"
3	19 January	MARS, Karpe Diem, Unge Ferrari and Arif	"Jeg bruker ikke kondom"
4	26 January	MARS, Karpe Diem, Unge Ferrari and Arif	"Jeg bruker ikke kondom"
5	2 February	Drake	"God's Plan"
6	9 February	Rudimental featuring Jess Glynne, Macklemore and Dan Caplen	"These Days"
7	16 February	Rudimental featuring Jess Glynne, Macklemore and Dan Caplen	"These Days"
8	23 February	Rudimental featuring Jess Glynne, Macklemore and Dan Caplen	"These Days"
9	2 March	Rudimental featuring Jess Glynne, Macklemore and Dan Caplen	"These Days"
10	9 March	Rudimental featuring Jess Glynne, Macklemore and Dan Caplen	"These Days"
11	16 March	Rudimental featuring Jess Glynne, Macklemore and Dan Caplen	"These Days"
12	23 March	Rudimental featuring Jess Glynne, Macklemore and Dan Caplen	"These Days"
13	30 March	Rudimental featuring Jess Glynne, Macklemore and Dan Caplen	"These Days"
14	6 April	Rudimental featuring Jess Glynne, Macklemore and Dan Caplen	"These Days"
15	13 April	Rudimental featuring Jess Glynne, Macklemore and Dan Caplen	"These Days"
16	20 April	David Guetta and Sia	"Flames"
17	27 April	Ariana Grande	"No Tears Left to Cry"
18	4 May	Post Malone	"Better Now"
19	11 May	Post Malone	"Better Now"
20	18 May 2018	Post Malone	"Better Now"
21	25 May 2018	K-391 featuring Alan Walker, Julie Bergan and Seungri	"Ignite"
22	1 June 2018	K-391 featuring Alan Walker, Julie Bergan and Seungri	"Ignite"
23	8 June 2018	Mads Hansen	"Sommerkroppen"
24	15 June 2018	Mads Hansen	"Sommerkroppen"
25	22 June 2018	Mads Hansen	"Sommerkroppen"
26	29 June 2018	Mads Hansen	"Sommerkroppen"
27	6 July 2018	Mads Hansen	"Sommerkroppen"
28	13 July 2018	Mads Hansen	"Sommerkroppen"
29	20 July 2018	Mads Hansen	"Sommerkroppen"
30	27 July 2018	Mads Hansen	"Sommerkroppen"
31	3 August 2018	Alan Walker featuring Au/Ra and Tomine Harket	"Darkside"
32	10 August 2018	Alan Walker featuring Au/Ra and Tomine Harket	"Darkside"
33	17 August 2018	Alan Walker featuring Au/Ra and Tomine Harket	"Darkside"
34	24 August 2018	Alan Walker featuring Au/Ra and Tomine Harket	"Darkside"
35	31 August 2018	Alan Walker featuring Au/Ra and Tomine Harket	"Darkside"
36	7 September 2018	Dynoro and Gigi D'Agostino	"In My Mind"
37	14 September 2018	Dynoro and Gigi D'Agostino	"In My Mind"
38	21 September 2018	Dynoro and Gigi D'Agostino	"In My Mind"
39	28 September 2018	Lil Peep and XXXTentacion	"Falling Down"
40	5 October 2018	Alan Walker featuring Sophia Somajo	"Diamond Heart"
41	12 October 2018	Alan Walker featuring Sophia Somajo	"Diamond Heart"
42	19 October 2018	Ava Max	"Sweet but Psycho"
43	26 October 2018	Ava Max	"Sweet but Psycho"
44	2 November 2018	Ava Max	"Sweet but Psycho"
45	9 November 2018	Ava Max	"Sweet but Psycho"
46	16 November 2018	Ava Max	"Sweet but Psycho"
47	23 November 2018	Ava Max	"Sweet but Psycho"
48	30 November 2018	Erik Follestad and Linni Meister	"Juletragedien"
49	7 December 2018	Erik Follestad and Linni Meister	"Juletragedien"
50	14 December 2018	Erik Follestad and Linni Meister	"Juletragedien"
51	21 December 2018	Erik Follestad and Linni Meister	"Juletragedien"
52	28 December 2018	Mariah Carey	"All I Want for Christmas Is You"

== 2019 ==
Week	Publ. date	Artist(s)	Song title
1	4 January 2019	Ava Max	"Sweet but Psycho"
2	11 January 2019	Post Malone	"Wow"
3	18 January 2019	Post Malone	"Wow"
4	25 January 2019	Ariana Grande	"7 Rings"
5	1 February 2019	Ariana Grande	"7 Rings"
6	8 February 2019	Ariana Grande	"7 Rings"
7	15 February 2019	Ariana Grande	"7 Rings"
8	22 February 2019	Ariana Grande	"7 Rings"
9	1 March 2019	Lady Gaga and Bradley Cooper	"Shallow"
10	8 March 2019	Nicolay Ramm	"Raske briller"/ "Raske briller" (opera version)
11	15 March 2019	Nicolay Ramm	"Raske briller"/ "Raske briller" (opera version)
12	22 March 2019	Nicolay Ramm	"Raske briller"/ "Raske briller" (opera version)
13	29 March 2019	Nicolay Ramm	"Raske briller"/ "Raske briller" (opera version)
14	5 April 2019	Billie Eilish	"Bad Guy"
15	12 April 2019	Lil Nas X	"Old Town Road"
16	19 April 2019	Lil Nas X	"Old Town Road"
17	26 April 2019	Lil Nas X	"Old Town Road"
18	3 May 2019	Lil Nas X	"Old Town Road"
19	10 May 2019	Lil Nas X	"Old Town Road"
20	17 May 2019	Ed Sheeran and Justin Bieber	"I Don't Care"
21	24 May 2019	Keiino	"Spirit in the Sky"
22	31 May 2019	Lil Nas X	"Old Town Road"
23	7 June 2019	TIX	"Jeg vil ikke leve"
24	14 June 2019	Lil Nas X	"Old Town Road"
25	21 June 2019	Lil Nas X	"Old Town Road"
26	28 June 2019	Shawn Mendes and Camila Cabello	"Señorita"
27	5 July 2019	Shawn Mendes and Camila Cabello	"Señorita"
28	12 July 2019	Shawn Mendes and Camila Cabello	"Señorita"
29	19 July 2019	Shawn Mendes and Camila Cabello	"Señorita"
30	26 July 2019	Shawn Mendes and Camila Cabello	"Señorita"
31	2 August 2019	Tones and I	"Dance Monkey"
32	9 August 2019	Tones and I	"Dance Monkey"
33	16 August 2019	Tones and I	"Dance Monkey"
34	23 August 2019	Tones and I	"Dance Monkey"
35	30 August 2019	Tones and I	"Dance Monkey"
36	6 September 2019	Tones and I	"Dance Monkey"
37	13 September 2019	Tones and I	"Dance Monkey"
38	20 September 2019	Tones and I	"Dance Monkey"
39	27 September 2019	Tones and I	"Dance Monkey"
40	4 October 2019	Tones and I	"Dance Monkey"
41	11 October 2019	Tones and I	"Dance Monkey"
42	18 October 2019	Tones and I	"Dance Monkey"
43	25 October 2019	Tones and I	"Dance Monkey"
44	1 November 2019	Tones and I	"Dance Monkey"
45	8 November 2019	Tones and I	"Dance Monkey"
46	15 November 2019	Tones and I	"Dance Monkey"
47	22 November 2019	Billie Eilish	"Everything I Wanted"
48	29 November 2019	Tones and I	"Dance Monkey"
49	6 December 2019	Mariah Carey	"All I Want for Christmas Is You"
50	13 December 2019	Mariah Carey	"All I Want for Christmas Is You"
51	20 December 2019	Mariah Carey	"All I Want for Christmas Is You"
52	27 December 2019	Mariah Carey	"All I Want for Christmas Is You"

== See also ==
- List of number-one albums in Norway
