= Armer og bein =

Studio album by DumDum Boys
- Released: 19 October 2018
- Genre: Rock
- Length: 37:58
- Label: Oh Yeah!

DumDum Boys chronology
Ti liv (2012)	Armer og bein (2018)

Armer og bein ("Arms and Legs") is the eleventh album by the Norwegian rock band DumDum Boys.

The album was regarded as a "surprise album", not being announced or marketed before its release. It received decent reviews with a dice throw of 4 (out of 6) in Verdens Gang and Dagbladet. According to Adresseavisen, "Several songs are close to the best they have done".

The album reached number 1 on the VG-lista albums chart—in week 43 of 2018.

== Personnel ==
- Prepple Houmb - vocals
- Kjartan Kristiansen - guitar
- Aslak Dørum - bass
- Sola Jonsen - drums, percussion

== Track listing ==
1. "Lange dager" – 3:42
2. "Champagne på senga" – 3:46
3. "Full fyr" – 3:18
4. "Frem fra glemselen" – 3:09
5. "Den perfekte storm" – 5:26
6. "Supernova" – 3:09
7. "Torden i det fjerne" – 3:43
8. "Armer og bein" – 3:14
9. "Mer enn nok" – 3:36
10. "Tilgi oss aldri" – 4:55
