= VG-lista 1958 =

Norwegian music chart

This is a complete list of all the singles that entered the VG-lista - the official Norwegian hit-chart - in 1958, which was the first year of the list. 19 singles entered the VG-lista in 1958 altogether and these are all listed below according to how well they have charted over time.

== Detailed listing of number-one hits in 1958 ==
Week	Artist	Single	Country	Weeks			Straight to #1 ?
Week	Artist	Single	Country	Top 1	Top 10	Top 20	Straight to #1 ?
42	Billy Vaughn	"Sail Along Silvery Moon"	(United States)	3	8		Yes
43	Billy Vaughn	"Sail Along Silvery Moon"					
44	Billy Vaughn	"Sail Along Silvery Moon"					
45	Louis Prima	"Buona sera"	(United States)	9	17		No
46	Louis Prima	"Buona sera"					
47	Louis Prima	"Buona sera"					
48	Louis Prima	"Buona sera"					
49	Louis Prima	"Buona sera"					
50	Louis Prima	"Buona sera"					
51	Louis Prima	"Buona sera"					
52	Louis Prima	"Buona sera"					

== Top singles of 1958 ==
Position	Artist	Song title	Highest position	Points
1	Connie Francis	"Carolina Moon"	1	350
2	Louis Prima	"Buona sera"	1	314
3	Elvis Presley	"King Creole"	3	310
4	Elvis Presley	"I Got Stung"	2	246
5	Marino Marini	"Come prima"	2	226
6	Bjørg og Per Gunnar	"Så kom våren til Tarina"	2	223
7	Domenico Modugno	"Volare (Nel blu dipinto di blu)"	2	206
8	Ricky Nelson	"Poor Little Fool"	6	174
9	Billy Vaughn	"Sail Along Silvery Moon"	1	133
10	Kalin Twins	"When"	3	130
11	The Pony-Tails	"Born Too Late"	6	87
12	Johnny Mathis	"A Certain Smile"	7	85
13	Dean Martin	"Return To Me (Ritorna a me)"	8	81
14	Dean Martin	"Volare (Nel blu dipinto di blu)"	3	74
15	Bjørg og Mikkel	"På Billy Bryants kafé"	9	34
16	Gunnar Engedahl & Erling Stordahl	"Liselotte"	4	30
17	Mitch Miller	"The River Kwai March"	8	25
18	Bjørg og Mikkel	"Det blå hav"	6	15
19	The McGuire Sisters	"Volare (Nel blu dipinto di blu)"	7	14
