= VG-lista 1959 =

Norwegian music chart

This is a complete list of all the singles that entered the VG-lista - the official Norwegian hit-chart - in 1959. 48 singles entered the VG-lista in 1959 altogether and these are all listed below according to how well they have charted over time.

== 1959 ==
Week	Artist	Single	Country	Weeks			Straight to #1 ?
Week	Artist	Single	Country	Top 1	Top 10	Top 20	Straight to #1 ?
1	Louis Prima	"Buona sera"	(United States)				
2	Connie Francis	"Carolina Moon"	(United States)	1	21		No
3	The Kingston Trio	"Tom Dooley"	(United States)	14	25		No
4	The Kingston Trio	"Tom Dooley"					
5	The Kingston Trio	"Tom Dooley"					
6	The Kingston Trio	"Tom Dooley"					
7	The Kingston Trio	"Tom Dooley"					
8	The Kingston Trio	"Tom Dooley"					
9	The Kingston Trio	"Tom Dooley"					
10	Little Richard	"Baby Face"	(United States)	3	14		No
11	Little Richard	"Baby Face"					
12	Little Richard	"Baby Face"					
13	The Kingston Trio	"Tom Dooley"					
14	The Kingston Trio	"Tom Dooley"					
15	The Kingston Trio	"Tom Dooley"					
16	The Kingston Trio	"Tom Dooley"					
17	The Kingston Trio	"Tom Dooley"					
18	The Kingston Trio	"Tom Dooley"					
19	The Kingston Trio	"Tom Dooley"					
20	Chris Barber's Jazz Band	"Petite Fleur"	(United Kingdom)	10	26		No
21	Chris Barber's Jazz Band	"Petite Fleur"					
22	Chris Barber's Jazz Band	"Petite Fleur"					
23	Chris Barber's Jazz Band	"Petite Fleur"					
24	Chris Barber's Jazz Band	"Petite Fleur"					
25	Chris Barber's Jazz Band	"Petite Fleur"					
26	Chris Barber's Jazz Band	"Petite Fleur"					
27	Chris Barber's Jazz Band	"Petite Fleur"					
28	Chris Barber's Jazz Band	"Petite Fleur"					
29	Chris Barber's Jazz Band	"Petite Fleur"					
30	Per Asplin	"En glad calypso om våren"	(Norway)	5	18		No
31	Per Asplin	"En glad calypso om våren"					
32	Per Asplin	"En glad calypso om våren"					
33	Per Asplin	"En glad calypso om våren"					
34	Per Asplin	"En glad calypso om våren"					
35	Cliff Richard	"Living Doll"	(United Kingdom)	10	23		No
36	Cliff Richard	"Living Doll"					
37	Cliff Richard	"Living Doll"					
38	Cliff Richard	"Living Doll"					
39	Cliff Richard	"Living Doll"					
40	Cliff Richard	"Living Doll"					
41	Cliff Richard	"Living Doll"					
42	Cliff Richard	"Living Doll"					
43	Cliff Richard	"Living Doll"					
44	Cliff Richard	"Living Doll"					
45	Craig Douglas	"Only Sixteen"	(United Kingdom)	4	15		No
46	Craig Douglas	"Only Sixteen"					
47	Craig Douglas	"Only Sixteen"					
48	Craig Douglas	"Only Sixteen"					
49	Cliff Richard	"Travellin' Light"	(United Kingdom)	3	15		No
50	Cliff Richard	"Travellin' Light"					
51	Cliff Richard	"Travellin' Light"					
52	Emile Ford	"What Do You Want To Make Those Eyes At Me For"	(Saint Lucia)	7	15		No
53	Emile Ford	What Do You Want To Make Those Eyes At Me For					

== Top singles of 1959 ==
Position	Artist	Song title	Highest position	Points
1	The Kingston Trio	"Tom Dooley"	1	465
2	Chris Barber's Jazz Band	"Petite Fleur"	1	458
3	Cliff Richard	"Living Doll"	1	414
4	Billy Vaughn	"Morgen"	2	364
5	Vidar Sandbeck	"Pengegaloppen"	2	354
6	Elvis Presley	"I Need Your Love Tonight"	2	304
7	Connie Francis	"My Happiness"	2	302
8	Per Asplin	"En glad calypso om våren"	1	299
9	Craig Douglas	"Only Sixteen"	1	271
10	Emile Ford & The Checkmates	"What Do You Want to Make Those Eyes at Me For?"	1	269
10	Elvis Presley	"A Big Hunk O' Love"	2	269
12	Conway Twitty	"Mona Lisa"	2	262
13	Cliff Richard	"Travellin' Light"	1	261
14	Little Richard	"Baby Face"	1	239
15	Gunnar Engedahl & Erling Stordahl	"Ungkarsvalsen"	4	216
16	Ricky Nelson	"Never Be Anyone Else But You"	3	214
17	Guy Mitchell	"Heartaches by the Number"	3	208
18	Ruby Murray	"Goodbye Jimmy, Goodbye"	2	186
19	Vidar Sandbeck	"Gull og grønne skoger"	4	183
20	Stonewall Jackson	"Waterloo"	2	175
21	Cliff Richard	"High Class Baby"	3	148
22	Elvis Presley	"A Fool Such as I"	5	130
23	Ricky Nelson	"Someday (You'll Want Me to Want You)"	3	127
24	The Browns	"The Three Bells"	6	125
25	Bruno Martino	"Piove"	8	122
26	Lloyd Price	"Personality"	6	120
27	Conway Twitty	"It's Only Make Believe"	2	113
28	Little Richard	"By the Light of the Silvery Moon"	4	112
29	Gunnar Engedahl & Erling Stordahl	"Piken i dalen"	5	107
30	Shirley Bassey	"Kiss Me, Honey Honey, Kiss Me"	6	103
31	Bobby Darin	"Dream Lover"	5	100
32	The Fleetwoods	"Mr. Blue"	5	99
33	Cliff Richard	"Move It"	5	97
33	Nora Brockstedt	"Augustin"	5	97
35	The Coasters	"Charlie Brown"	5	85
36	Cliff Richard	"Never Mind"	5	82
37	Jerry Keller	"Here Comes Summer"	8	73
38	Connie Francis	"Lipstick On Your Collar"	7	80
39	Lloyd Price	"Stagger Lee"	8	58
40	Floyd Robinson	"Makin' Love"	7	53
41	Jane Morgan	"The Day the Rains Came"	7	49
42	Bing Crosby	"White Christmas"	6	41
43	Paul Anka	"Lonely Boy"	9	36
44	Bobby Darin	"Mack the Knife"	9	34
45	Pat Boone	"I'll Remember Tonight"	9	23
46	Sam Cooke	"Only Sixteen"	10	22
47	Bruno Martino	"Come prima"	9	12
48	Lord Rockingham's XI	"Hoots Mon"	10	11
