= Gravitasjon =

Studio album by DumDum Boys
- Released: March 15, 2006
- Recorded: 2005
- Studio: Athletic Sound; Amper Tone Studio; Duper Studio
- Genre: Rock
- Length: 38:54
- Label: Oh Yeah! Records
- Producer: Yngve Sætre

DumDum Boys chronology
Totem (1998)	Gravitasjon (2006)	Tidsmaskin (2009)

Singles from Gravitasjon
- 1. "Enhjørning" Released: January 31, 2006

Professional ratings
Review scores
Source	Rating
Panorama.no	4/6 link
Dagbladet	link

Gravitasjon (English: Gravity) is the eight studio album by the Norwegian rock band DumDum Boys. Released in March 2006, it is the band's first album since 1998's Totem. The album was preceded by the lead single "Enhjørning", released in January, and debuted at number one on the Norwegian charts. It has sold over 80,000 copies. It is the band's last album to feature long-time keyboardist Atle Karlsen.

== Track listing ==
No.	Title	Writer(s)	Length
1.	"Lunta Brenner"	Kjartan Kristiansen	3:29
2.	"Gå På Vannet"	Kristiansen	3:39
3.	"Tynn Tråd"	Aslak Dørum	4:07
4.	"Enhjørning"	Kristiansen	3:49
5.	"Gravitasjon"	Dørum; Kristiansen	3:54
6.	"Takke Faen"	Dørum	3:49
7.	"Brillefint"	Kristiansen	2:44
8.	"Tip Top"	Kristiansen	3:44
9.	"Stengetid"	Dørum	2:45
10.	"Seig Jævel"	Dørum; Kristiansen	3:09
11.	"Waltzheimer"	Dørum; Atle Karlsen	3:45
Total length:			38:54

== Personnel ==
DumDum Boys

- Prepple Houmb – lead vocals
- Kjartan Kristiansen – guitars
- Atle Karlsen – keyboards
- Aslak Dørum – bass
- Sola Jonsen – drums

Additional personnel

- Yngve Sætre – producer
- Morten Lund – mastering
- Baard Slagsvold – horn arrangements (track 1)
- Fredrik Øie Jensen – horns (track 1)
- Ole Jørn Myklebust – horns (track 1)
- Lars Horntveth – horns, horn arrangements (track 11)
- Erik Johannessen – horns (track 11)
- Hege Horntveth – horns (track 11)
- Mathias Eick – horns (track 11)

== Charts ==
Chart (2006)	Peak position
Norwegian Albums (VG-lista)	1
