= VG-lista 1960 =

Norwegian music chart

This is a complete list of all the singles that entered the VG-lista (the official Norwegian hit-chart) in 1960. Altogether, 46 singles entered the VG-lista in 1960, and they are all listed below according to how well they have charted over time.

== Detailed listing of Number-One hits in 1960 ==
Week	Artist	Single	Country	Weeks			Straight to #1 ?
Week	Artist	Single	Country	Top 1	Top 10	Top 20	Straight to #1 ?
1	Emile Ford	"What Do You Want To Make Those Eyes At Me For"	(Saint Lucia)				
2	Emile Ford	"What Do You Want To Make Those Eyes At Me For"					
3	Emile Ford	"What Do You Want To Make Those Eyes At Me For"					
4	Emile Ford	"What Do You Want To Make Those Eyes At Me For"					
5	Emile Ford	"What Do You Want To Make Those Eyes At Me For"					
6	Nora Brockstedt	"Er du glad i meg ennå, Karl Johan?"	(Norway)	5	18		No
7	Nora Brockstedt	"Er du glad i meg ennå, Karl Johan?"					
8	Nora Brockstedt	"Er du glad i meg ennå, Karl Johan?"					
9	Nora Brockstedt	"Er du glad i meg ennå, Karl Johan?"					
10	Nora Brockstedt	"Er du glad i meg ennå, Karl Johan?"					
11	Rocco Granata	"Marina"	(Belgium)	15	27		No
12	Rocco Granata	"Marina"					
13	Rocco Granata	"Marina"					
14	Rocco Granata	"Marina"					
15	Rocco Granata	"Marina"					
16	Rocco Granata	"Marina"					
17	Rocco Granata	"Marina"					
18	Rocco Granata	"Marina"					
19	Rocco Granata	"Marina"					
20	Rocco Granata	"Marina"					
21	Rocco Granata	"Marina"					
22	Rocco Granata	"Marina"					
23	Rocco Granata	"Marina"					
24	Rocco Granata	"Marina"					
25	Rocco Granata	"Marina"					
26	Billy Vaughn	"Blue Hawaii"	(United States)	3	21		No
27	Billy Vaughn	"Blue Hawaii"					
28	Billy Vaughn	"Blue Hawaii"					
29	Jim Reeves	"He'll Have to Go"	(United States)	5	29		No
30	Jim Reeves	"He'll Have to Go"					
31	Jim Reeves	"He'll Have to Go"					
32	Jim Reeves	"He'll Have to Go"					
33	Jim Reeves	"He'll Have to Go"					
34	Cliff Richard	"Please Don't Tease"	(United Kingdom)	3	13		No
35	Cliff Richard	"Please Don't Tease"					
36	Cliff Richard	"Please Don't Tease"					
37	Connie Francis	"Everybody's Somebody's Fool"	(United States)	8	21		No
38	Connie Francis	"Everybody's Somebody's Fool"					
39	Connie Francis	"Everybody's Somebody's Fool"					
40	Connie Francis	"Everybody's Somebody's Fool"					
41	Connie Francis	"Everybody's Somebody's Fool"					
42	Connie Francis	"Everybody's Somebody's Fool"					
43	Connie Francis	"Everybody's Somebody's Fool"					
44	Connie Francis	"Everybody's Somebody's Fool"					
45	Inger Jacobsen	"Frøken Johansen og jeg"	(Norway)	4	16		No
46	Inger Jacobsen	"Frøken Johansen og jeg"					
47	Inger Jacobsen	"Frøken Johansen og jeg"					
48	Inger Jacobsen	"Frøken Johansen og jeg"					
49	Elvis Presley	"It's Now or Never"	(United States)	6	24		No
50	Elvis Presley	"It's Now or Never"					
51	Elvis Presley	"It's Now or Never"					
52	Elvis Presley	"It's Now or Never"					

== Top singles of 1960 ==
Position	Artist	Song title	Highest position	Points
1	Rocco Granata	"Marina"	1	498
2	Jim Reeves	"He'll Have to Go"	1	481
3	Elvis Presley	"It's Now or Never"	1	438
4	Lolita	"Seemann, deine Heimat ist das Meer"	1	402
5	Connie Francis	"Everybody's Somebody's Fool"	1	365
6	Don Gibson	"I Can't Stop Loving You"	2	358
7	Jack Scott	"What in the World's Come Over You"	2	354
8	Billy Vaughn Orchestra	"Blue Hawaii"	1	350
9	Nora Brockstedt	"Er du glad i meg ennå, Karl Johan"	1	304
10	Inger Jacobsen	"Frøken Johansen og jeg"	1	287
11	Bob Luman	"Let's Think About Living"	3	240
12	Elvis Presley	"Stuck On You"	2	227
13	Roy Orbison	"Only The Lonely"	4	223
14	Cliff Richard	"Please Don't Tease"	1	222
15	Hank Locklin	"Please Help Me, I'm Falling"	4	215
16	Edith Piaf	"Milord"	6	187
17	Fats Domino	"Be My Guest"	3	173
18	Johnny Preston	"Running Bear"	2	167
19	Brian Hyland	"Itsy Bitsy Teenie Weenie Yellow Polka Dot Bikini"	3	161
20	The Drifters	"Save the Last Dance for Me"	3	160
21	Bjørg og Per Gunnar	"Zanzibar"	3	153
22	Johnny Preston	"Cradle of Love"	5	145
23	Cliff Richard	"Fall in Love with You"	6	140
24	Frankie Avalon	"Why"	3	139
25	Gunnar Engedahl & Erling Stordahl	"Skuddårsvalsen"	5	137
26	Nora Brockstedt	"Voi Voi"	5	127
27	Elvis Presley	"A Mess of Blues"	4	123
28	The Everly Brothers	"Cathy's Clown"	5	108
29	Jimmy Jones	"Good Timin'"	4	103
30	Cliff Richard & The Shadows	"I Love You"	6	96
31	Freddy Cannon	"Way Down Yonder In New Orleans"	6	94
32	Eddie Cochran	"Three Steps to Heaven"	7	88
33	Ricky Valance	"Tell Laura I Love Her"	6	81
34	Elisabeth Grannemann	"Alle venter på sommer"	6	80
35	Cliff Richard	"Nine Times Out of Ten"	7	79
36	Paul Evans	"Seven Little Girls Sitting in the Back Seat"	6	78
37	Pat Boone	"Walking the Floor Over You"	6	69
38	Emile Ford & The Checkmates	"On a Slow Boat to China"	7	63
39	Fats Domino	"Walking to New Orleans"	9	58
40	Neil Sedaka	"Oh! Carol"	5	57
41	Cliff Richard	"A Voice in the Wilderness"	8	47
42	Steve Lawrence	"Footsteps"	9	46
43	Bjørg og Per Gunnar	"Hjemlandets sang"	9	45
44	Willy Alberti	"Marina"	7	26
45	The Avons	"Seven Little Girls Sitting in the Back Seat"	8	13
46	Louis Armstrong / Danny Kaye	"Five Pennies Saints"	10	11
