= Bønda fra nord =

1998 song by Racer

Bønda fra nord ("The Peasants from the North") is a 1998 punk rock song released as a single by the group Racer on the label Oh Yeah! (with distribution from Sony). It was an unofficial song marking Norway's participation at the 1998 FIFA World Cup, but soon surpassed the official song in popularity.

== Release, reception and charting ==
Norway's official 1998 World Cup song was "Let's Do It" by Jørn Hoel, Steinar Albrigtsen and Øivind Elgenes. The drummer on "Bønda fra nord", Sola Jonsen, lamented the choice to sing "Let's Do It" in English as well as its general style, which "provoked" his band to write their song. It was quickly revealed that Racer was simply a guise of DumDum Boys. DumDum Boys played "Bønda fra nord" live in 1998.

The song was well received; Aftenposten gave 6 out of 6 points, stating that Racer immediately dethroned "Let's Do It". The punk energy was much more suitable than the "lullaby" provided by the vocal trio. Verdens Gang gave a dice throw of 5, stating that DumDum Boys jettisoned national romanticism in favour of football chants. Historian of popular music, Audun Molde, nonetheless stated that "Bønda fra nord" resonnated with the "raw, ancient power" known from the Viking Age.

"Bønda fra nord" entered the Norwegian charts VG-lista in week 26, debuting at #12, peaking at #4 and lasting seven weeks. In the end, the single sold 7,000 copies. According to Dagens Næringsliv, the proceeds were donated to charity in Nairobi. "Bønda fra nord" received far more airplay than "Let's Do It", though far less than the international hit "La Copa de la Vida", and was chosen by NRK during the celebrations after Norway beat Brazil.

In 2000, Norway participated at the UEFA Euro 2000. "Bønda fra nord 2000" was re-released with updated lyrics. Again, it received a dice throw of 5 from VG as well asDagbladet, and declared as the most favourable of the various Euro 2000 songs on the market, whereas Dagsavisen called it "even more raw" than the 1998 version. The song went straight to #1 at VG-lista where it stayed for another week. It vanished from the chart after five weeks.

Preceded by "It Feels So Good" by Sonique	Number-one song in Norway; 12–26 June 2000	Succeeded by "It Feels So Good" by Sonique
