= Rune Rudberg =

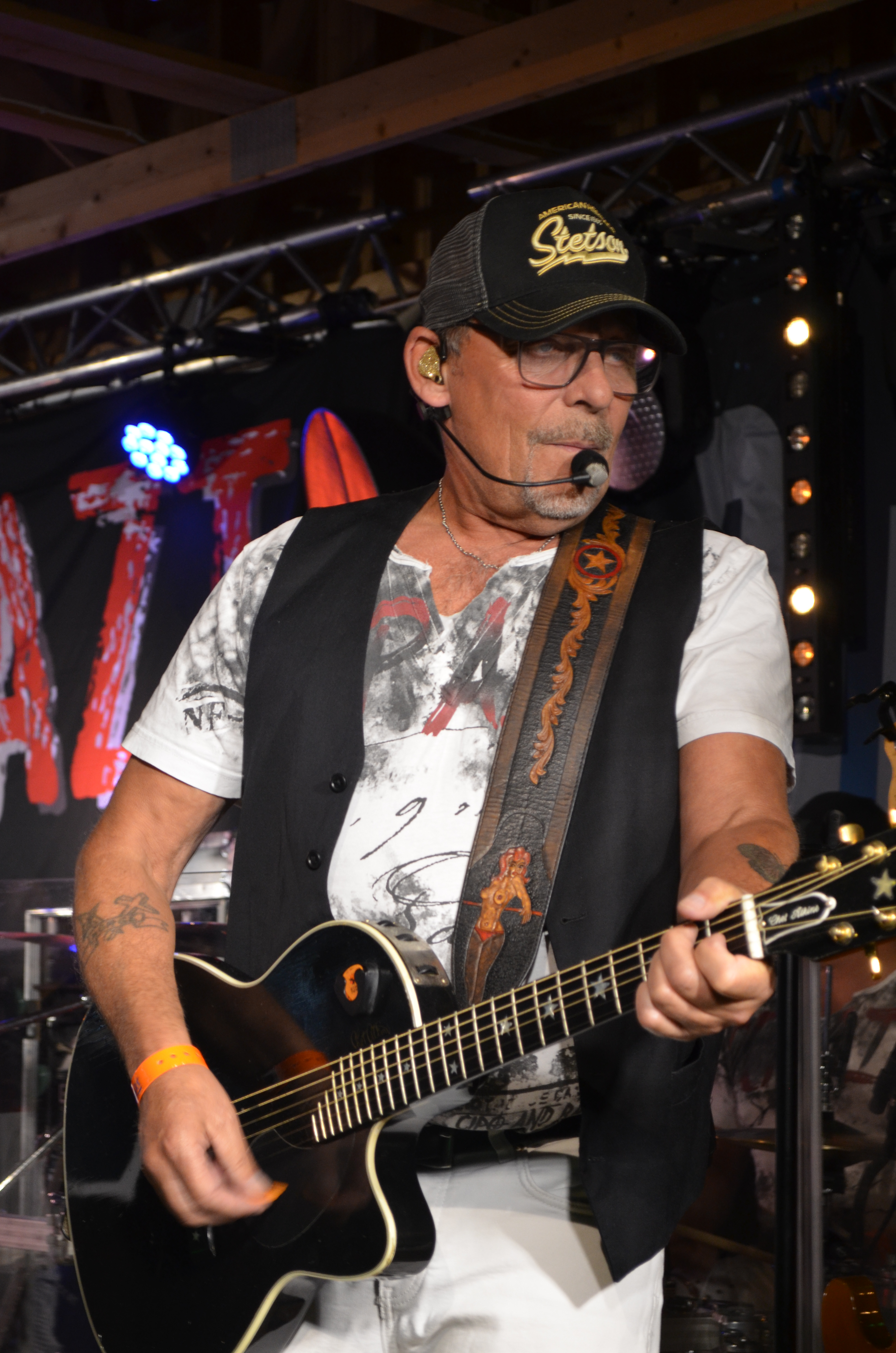

Background information
- Birth name: Rune Rudberg
- Born: August 23, 1961 (age 64); Trøgstad, Norway
- Genres: Dansband; country
- Occupation: Singer
- Instrument: Guitar
- Website: www.runerudbergband.no

Rune Rudberg (born 23 August 1961) is a Norwegian singer originating from Trøgstad in Østfold singing dansband music. He has a hectic live music career with more than 5000 concerts in Norway.

He is best known for his song "Ut mot havet" in 1988. The same titled album peaked VG-lista albums chart. He also took part on three occasions in Norwegian Melodi Grand Prix in a bid to represent Norway in Eurovision. The first was in MGP 1989 with "Vinger over Europa" failing to make it to Final 3. Twelve years later, he took part in MGP 2001 with the self-written and composed song "Without You". But he finished fifth failing to make to the Final 4 stage. In 2017, he participated again with his band in MGP 2017 with "Run Run Away", but failed to reach the Gold Final.

Besides his solo career, he was part of the dansband Scandinavia on and off. He was a member from 1990 to 1994, then for two years 1996 and 1997, and finally 2004–2005, when he left after news about his use of narcotics.

== Discography ==
=== Albums ===
Studio

Year	Album	Peak positions
Year	Album	NOR
1988	Ut mot havet	1
1989	Vinger over Europa	7
1990	Lysene fra land	–
1994	Tidevannsbølger	–
1997	Halfway to Paradise	–
1999	Julenissen tror på meg	–
2000	På nye eventyr	–
2004	Gone Country	–
2007	Runaway	–
2009	Stormande hav	–
2012	Strong Enough	–
2013	Tro	1

Compilations

Year	Album	Peak positions
Year	Album	NOR
1995	Landeplager	19
2000	På oppfordring	–
2003	Fri som en vind	–
2004	Topp 20	–
2007	Rett fra sofaen	34

Albums as part of Scandinavia dansband

- 1991: På oppforring
- 1992: Scandinavia 3
- 1993: Scandinavia 4

=== Singles ===
Year	Single	Peak positions	Album
Year	Single	NOR	Album
1988	"Ut mot havet"	–	Ut mot havet
1989	"Vinger over Europa"	–	Vinger over Europa
2001	"Without You"	–	
2017	"Run Run Away"	–	
2025	"Flesk og duppe" (with Plumbo, Staysman and Halva Priset)	29	Non-album single

Featured in

Year	Single	Peak positions	Album
Year	Single	NOR	Album
2003	"Stank Ass Ho 2" (Jaa9 & OnklP feat. Rune Rudberg)	11	
