= Ola Nordmann (song) =

Single by Plumbo

from the album Rådebank
- Released: February 2012
- Recorded: 2012
- Genre: Pop
- Songwriters: Lars Erik Blokkhus (music); Glenn Hauger (lyrics)

Plumbo singles chronology
"Møkkamann" (2010)	"Ola Nordmann" (2012)

Music video
- "Ola Nordmann" on YouTube

"Ola Nordmann" is a Norwegian language song by the Norwegian band Plumbo. The music was written by band member Lars Erik Blokkhus and the lyrics is by another band member Glenn Hauger. It is about the traditional Norwegian character Ola Nordmann. The song was a follow-up to Plumbo's successful single "Møkkamann" that topped VG lista, the official Norwegian Singles Chart.

Plumbo took part in the Melodi Grand Prix 2012 in a bid to represent Norway in the Eurovision Song Contest 2012. On 28 January 2012, at the semi-final 2 stage held in Arena Larvik in Larvik, the song came first in 10 participating songs, winning the right to be featured in the Final 10 section. On 11 February, it took part in the Final 10, reaching the Top 4 stage but was voted out in favour of Tooji and his song "Stay".

Song	Juries				Televoting Regions					
Song	Ørland	Larvik	Florø	Total	Northern Norway	Western Norway	Southern Norway	Central Norway	Eastern Norway	Total
"Ola Nordmann"	2,000	4,000	4,000	10,000	1,089	7,037	12,712	11,633	19,397	51,868
"Somewhere Beautiful"	8,000	8,000	8,000	24,000	1,381	9,776	12,615	14,581	27,693	66,046
"Things Change"	4,000	2,000	2,000	8,000	2,452	11,552	14,907	19,963	22,811	71,685
"Stay"	6,000	6,000	6,000	18,000	3,425	21,146	26,474	32,114	54,321	137,480

== Music video ==
Plumbo released a music video that shows Norwegian pride and is based on the effect of the traditional Ola Nordmann character in his traditional cloths on the Norwegian psyche. The video was produced by Royal Picture and directed by Christer Aase.

The video starts with quick snapshots of friends sitting gloomily in a room near an empty table, some youth skateboarding in an indoor skateboarding venue, a band playing in a small club and a man jogging on an empty road near a forest.

Suddenly the character Ola Nordmann appears on the empty road where the man is passing and starts planting small Norwegian flags Ola takes from his back sack on some trees. Then Ola Nordmann is shown going to the indoor skateboarding center where, to the surprise of the youth there, he takes out a skateboard from his back sack and starts skateboarding. Then Ola Nordmann visits the home of the three individuals and cheers them up by producing spirit drinks and sharing it with them creating a cheerful atmosphere and putting a flag on their table they are happy and start waving their own Norwegian flags.

Finally Ola Nordmann visits the club where the band is performing (actually Plumbo) and starts dancing on the stage. The band is shown displaying small Norwegian flags on their microphones and on their playing instruments. While the band plays on the refrain of "Ola Nordmann", there are also flashbacks of the youth skating carrying flags on their hand, the three friends jubilant singing the song waving their flags. The last scene, shows the Norwegian man that had briefly appeared at the beginning of the music video now jogging carrying a huge Norwegian flag in his hand while Ola Nordmann exits the scene disappearing in the woods.

== Chart performance ==
Despite not qualifying for Eurovision Song Contest, the song "Ola Nordmann" proved very popular and charted in the VG lista Norwegian Singles Chart, peaking at #4 the week following the Melodi Grand Prix final.

Chart (2012)	Peak position
Norway (VG-lista)	4
