= Plumbo =

Norwegian rock band

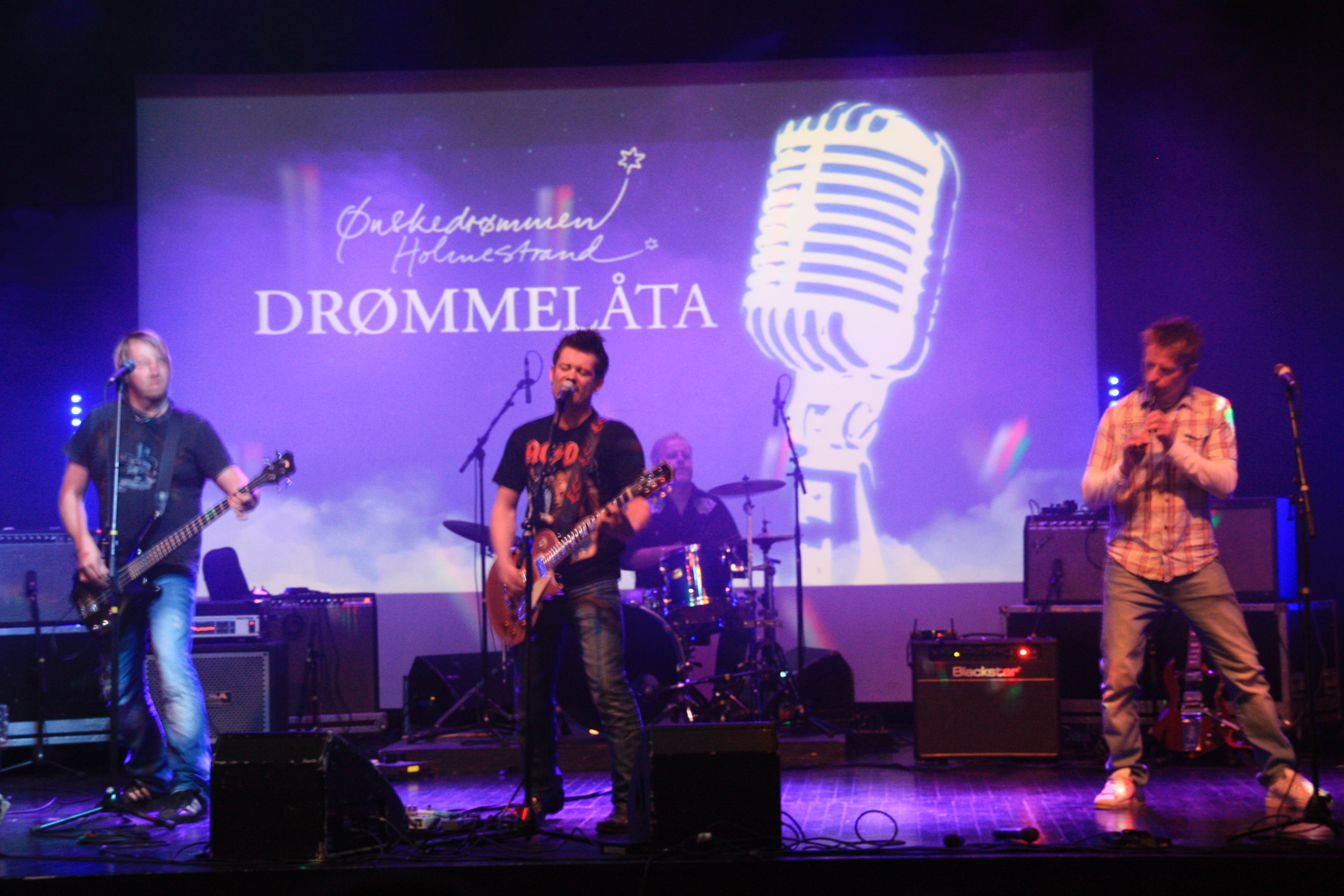
- Plumbo in Biorama, Holmestrand during Drømmelåta competition (2011)

Background information
- Origin: Sande, Norway
- Genres: Folk rock
- Years active: 2002–present
- Members: Lars Erik Blokkhus; Tommy Elstad; Glenn Hauger; Henning Hoel Eriksen
- Past members: Reidar Fiskebøl; Dag Arve Sandnes; Nils Magne Pettersen; Hans Inge Rønningen; Tom Erik Rønningen; Tor Erik Knudsen
- Website: www.heltplumbo.net

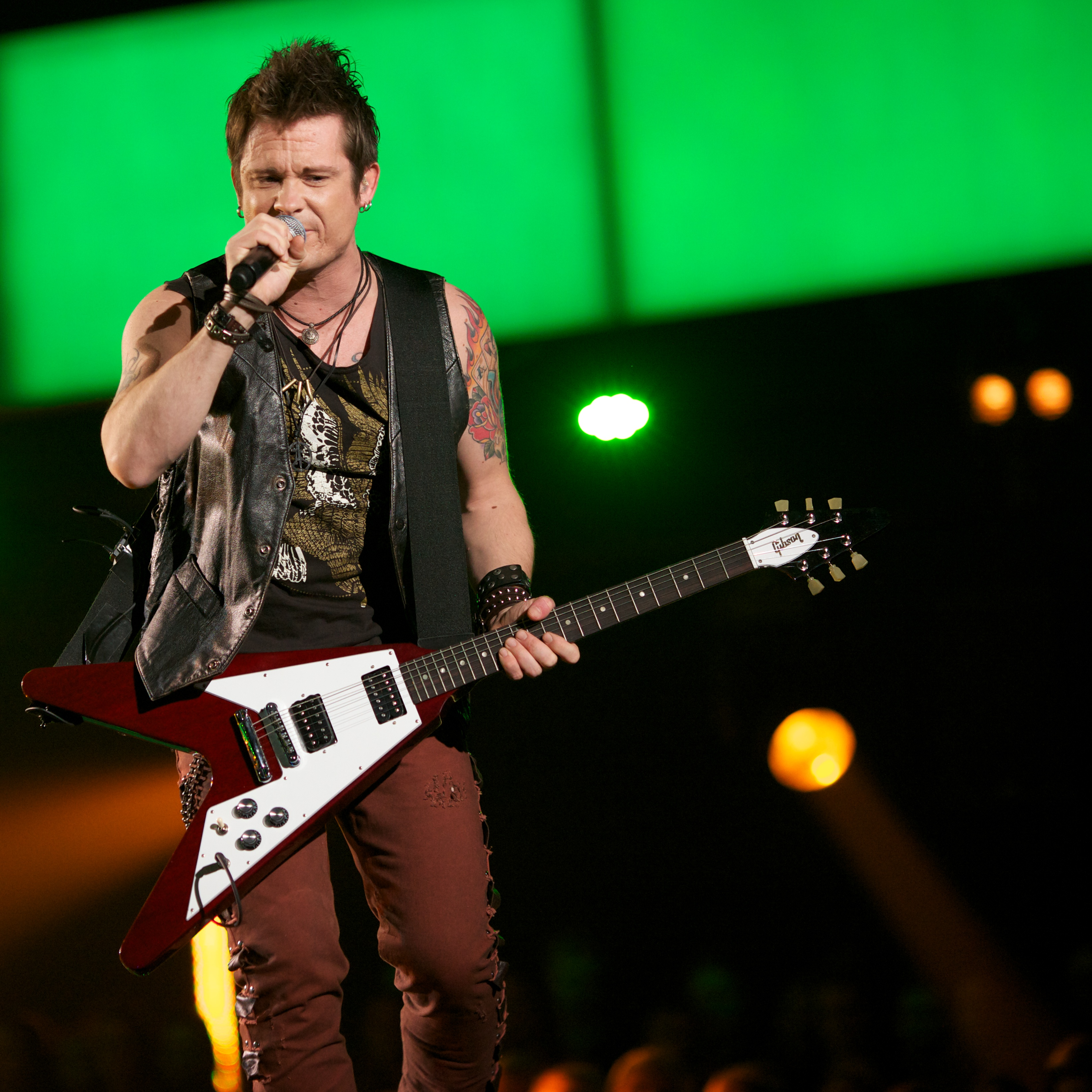
Plumbo lead vocalist Lars Erik Blokkhus during Norsk Melodi Grand Prix, 2012

Plumbo is a Norwegian rock and folk rock band from Sande, Vestfold, Norway. The three-piece band consists of Lars Erik Blokkhus (vocals, guitar), Tommy Elstad (bass) and Hasse Rønningen (drums), with assistance from supporting musician Glenn Hauger on accordion and flute. Their repertoire includes Norwegian songs with a traditional twist, rock music elements and international appeal.

The name Plumbo is taken from a brand of drain cleaner sold in Norway.

== Members ==
Current

- Lars Erik Blokkhus – lead vocalist, guitar (1999–present)
- Tommy Løken-Elstad – bass, backing vocals (1999–present)
- Glenn Hauger – drums (1999-2002), accordion, flute, guitar (2010–present)
- Tor Erik "Elg" Knudsen – drums, backing vocals (2012–present)
- Henning Hoel Eriksen - keyboards, backing vocals (2014–present)

Previous

- Reidar Fiskebøl – drums (2002-2005, 2007)
- Dag Arve Sandnes - guitar (1999-2001)
- Nils-Magne Pettersen - keyboards (2003-2008)
- Hans Inge Rønningen – drums, backing vocals (2006, 2007-2012)
- Tom Erik Rønningen - guitar, backing vocals (2013-2016)

== History ==
The band's first release was the album Full åpning in 2002. Their next album, På vei til Harryland!, came in 2007. The band's breakthrough came with Råkk'n Råll Harry reaching No. 11 on the Norwegian Albums Chart. Their biggest hit song is the 2011 single "Møkkamann" from that album that peaked at number one in the Norwegian Singles Chart and subsequently won "Hit of the Year 2011" at Spellemannprisen 2012. based on votes from the general public. In 2011, the band entered the "Drømmelåta i Holmestrand" music competition, produced by TV 2, with their song "Drømmeland". After winning the Spellemannprisen, "Møkkamann" topped the VG-lista, the official Norwegian Singles Chart. Plumbo appears at gatebil rudskogen every summer.

=== "Møkkamann" controversy ===
On 14 January 2012, during the annual Spellemannprisen in Oslo, Plumbo gained some negative attention after lead singer Lars Erik Blokkhus accepted the prize for best song, for "Møkkamann" (roughly translated as "Dirt man" or "Shit man"). He proceeded to make a remark, meant as a joke, to the dark-skinned hosts Tshawe Baqwa and Yosef Wolde-Mariam, members of the popular Norwegian duo Madcon, saying that seeing them he thought the song got a new name; Mokkamann (literally Mocha man). After his remark, Blokkhus apologized for his comment.

== Discography ==
=== Albums ===
Year	Album	Peak position	Certifications	Track list
Year	Album	NOR	Certifications	Track list
2002	Full åpning	–		1. "Alminnelig mann" 2. "Spinnvill"; 3. "Engel"; 4. "Rir avsted" 5. "På god vei Nes"; 6. "Tirsdag & Torsdag"; 7. "Jomfrusang"; 8. "Siste stopp" 9. "Party"; 10. "Samme dyne"
2007	På vei til Harryland!	–		1. "Riksvei 96"; 2. "Harry Hoover"; 3. "Harryland"; 4. "Konger av sommeren" 5. "Gi meg en bayer" 6. "Tørst som faen" 7. "En liten jævel" 8. "Elle melle" 9. "Lever livet" 10. "Slutte å drekke" 11. "Ut mot havet 2007" with Rune Rudberg
2010	Råkk'n Råll Harry	11		1. "Møkkamann"; 2. "Kong Alkohol"; 3. "Deilig"; 4. "Gamle Harrymann"; 5. "Heite mæ hæij" 6. "I ei havn" 7. "Guri og en Chevy"; 8. "Sommernatt"; 9. "Råkk'n Råll Harry"; 10. "Kong Alkohol" (Dance remix)
2012	Rådebank	2		1. "Rådebank"; 2. "Ola Nordmann"; 3. "Ta meg" 4. "Drømmeland"; 5. "SvartePer"; 6. "Kjærlighet"; 7. "Paradise hotell" 8. "Gimle sag" 9. "Bestemors hus" 10. "Bønder i byen"
2014	Kom som dæ sjæl	7		1. "Kom som dæ sjæl" 2. "Vandrern"; 3. "Hold rundt meg i natt" 4. "Mine barns bein" 5. "Tia går" 6. "Sånn gjør vi det" 7. "Hilux lasteplan" 8. "Helt Texas"; 9. "Kansje i natt" 10. "Tøft å ha det tøft"

Live albums / DVDs

Year	Album	Peak position	Certifications	Track list
Year	Album	NOR	Certifications	Track list
2012	Møkkamenn Live	11		1. "Kong Alkohol"; 2. "Tørst som faen" 3. "Harry Hoover"; 4. "Kongen av sommeren" 5. "Guri og en Chevy"; 6. "Harryland"; 7. "Råkk'n Råll Harry"; 8. "Engel"; 9. "Slutte å drekke" 10. "Sommernatt"; 11. "I ei havn" 12. "Heite mæ hælj" 13. "Gi meg en bayer" 14. "Gamle Harrymann"; 15. "Møkkamann"
2016	Haraball	5		1. "Haraball"; 2. "Segway og ljå" 3. "Ting på gli" 4. "Det største jeg har" 5. "Bygda der jeg bor" 6. "La bjella slå" 7. "Fyllefant"; 8. "Tennplugg"; 9. "Du er sola" 10. "Apeegg"

Compilation albums
Live albums / DVDs

Year	Album	Peak position	Certifications	Track list
Year	Album	NOR	Certifications	Track list
2015	De 15 beste	–		CD1: 1. "Sommer'n 94" (Glenn Tangen, Ole Evenrud, Roar Hansen, Lars Erik Blokkhus), (New song); 2. "Ola Nordmann" (Glenn Hauger, Blokkhus); 3. "Møkkamann" (Traditional / Hauger; 4. "Hilux lasteplan" (Evenrud, Blokkhus); 5. "Rådebank" (Tom Erik Rønningen); 6. "Kong Alkohol" (Rønningen); 7. "I ei havn" (Blokkhus); 8. "Bønder i byen" (Hauger, Blokkhus); 9. "Gamle Harrymann" (Blokkhus); 10. "Vandrern" (Evenrud, Mats Wester, Py Bäckman); 11. "Gimle Sag" ([Hauger, Blokkhus); 12. "Ta meg" (with Endless) (Blokkhus, Nyhus) med Endless; 13. "Drømmeland" (Rønningen, Blokkhus); 14. "Slutte å drekke" (Jon Simensen, Blokkhus); 15. "Guri og en Chevy" (Børre Sørensen, Tor Olsen); CD 2 Uten plugg, rett fra stua (Unplugged): 1. "Ola Nordmann" (Hauger/Blokkhus); 2. "Kong Alkohol" (Rønningen); 3. "Harry Hoover" (Blokkhus); 4. "Rådebank" (Rønningen); 5. "Tørst som faen" (Bjørndalen/Blokkhus); 6. "Gimle Sag" (Hauger/Blokkhus); 7. "Heite mæ hæij" (Traditional, Hauger); 8. "Hilux lasteplan" (Evenrud/Blokkhus); 9. "Gamle Harrymann" (Blokkhus); 10. "Gi meg en bayer" (Blokkhus); 11. "Møkkamann" (Traditional, Hauger)

=== Singles ===
Year	Single	Peak chart positions	Album
Year	Single	NOR	Album
2010	"Møkkamann"	1	Råkk'n Råll Harry
2012	"Ola Nordmann"	4	Rådebank
2012	"Ta meg"	—	Rådebank
2017	"En siste gang" (with Staysman and Lazz)	21	
2017	"Bade naken"	17	
2025	"Flesk og duppe" (with Rune Rudberg, Staysman and Halva Priset)	29	Non-album single
