= Kjartan Kristiansen =

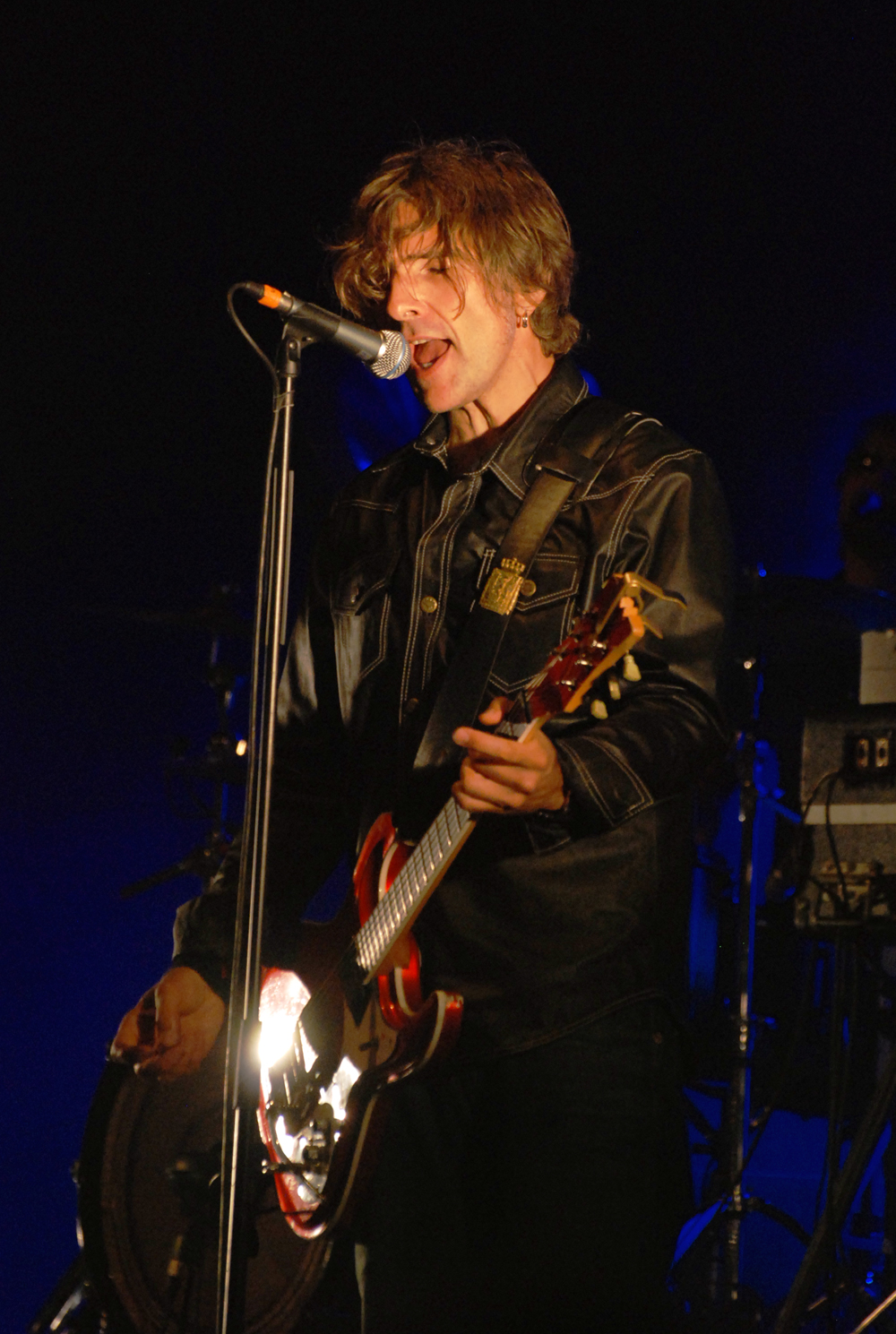
- Kristiansen performing live with DumDum Boys at Strandgateparken in Hamar, August 28, 2009.

Background information
- Birth name: Arild Kjartan Kristiansen
- Born: 14 August 1963 (age 61); Trondheim, Sør-Trøndelag
- Origin: Norway
- Genres: Rock; punk rock
- Occupation: Musician, composer, record producer
- Instruments: Guitar; vocals
- Member of: DumDum Boys; Wannskrækk; Racer

Kjartan Kristiansen (born 14 August 1963 in Trondheim, Norway) is a Norwegian musician, best known as the guitarist and backing vocalist of the Norwegian band DumDum Boys, where he also serves as lyricist and main songwriter. Kristiansen is also a member of the punk band Wannskrækk and the rock band Racer along with the other members of DumDum Boys.

== Biography ==
In the late 1970s, Kristiansen formed the punk band Wannskrækk in 1978, which later changed their name to DumDum Boys in 1985 and adopted a mainstream rock sound. The band would go on to become one of the leading Norwegian rock bands in the 1980s and 90s, and has released eleven studio albums as of 2018. Kristiansen has also released an EP and two albums with the band Tweeterfriendly Music.

In 2006, Kristiansen was awarded the Edvard Prize in the Popular music category for the song "Enhjørning" off the DumDum Boys album Gravitasjon. In 2009, he was along with Aslak Dørum awarded the Spellemann Award in the category This Year's Song for the lyrics to "Tidsmaskin". In 2012, he received the Lyricist Fund Award. Kristiansen also works as a producer and record mixer.

== Honors ==
- 2006: Edvard Prize in the category Popular music for the song "Enhjørning" from the DumDum Boys album Gravitasjon
- 2009: Spellemann Award in the category This Year's Song for the lyrics to the song "Tidsmaskin" by DumDum Boys
- 2012: Lyricist Fund Award for his lyrical contribution to Norwegian rock music through 35 years

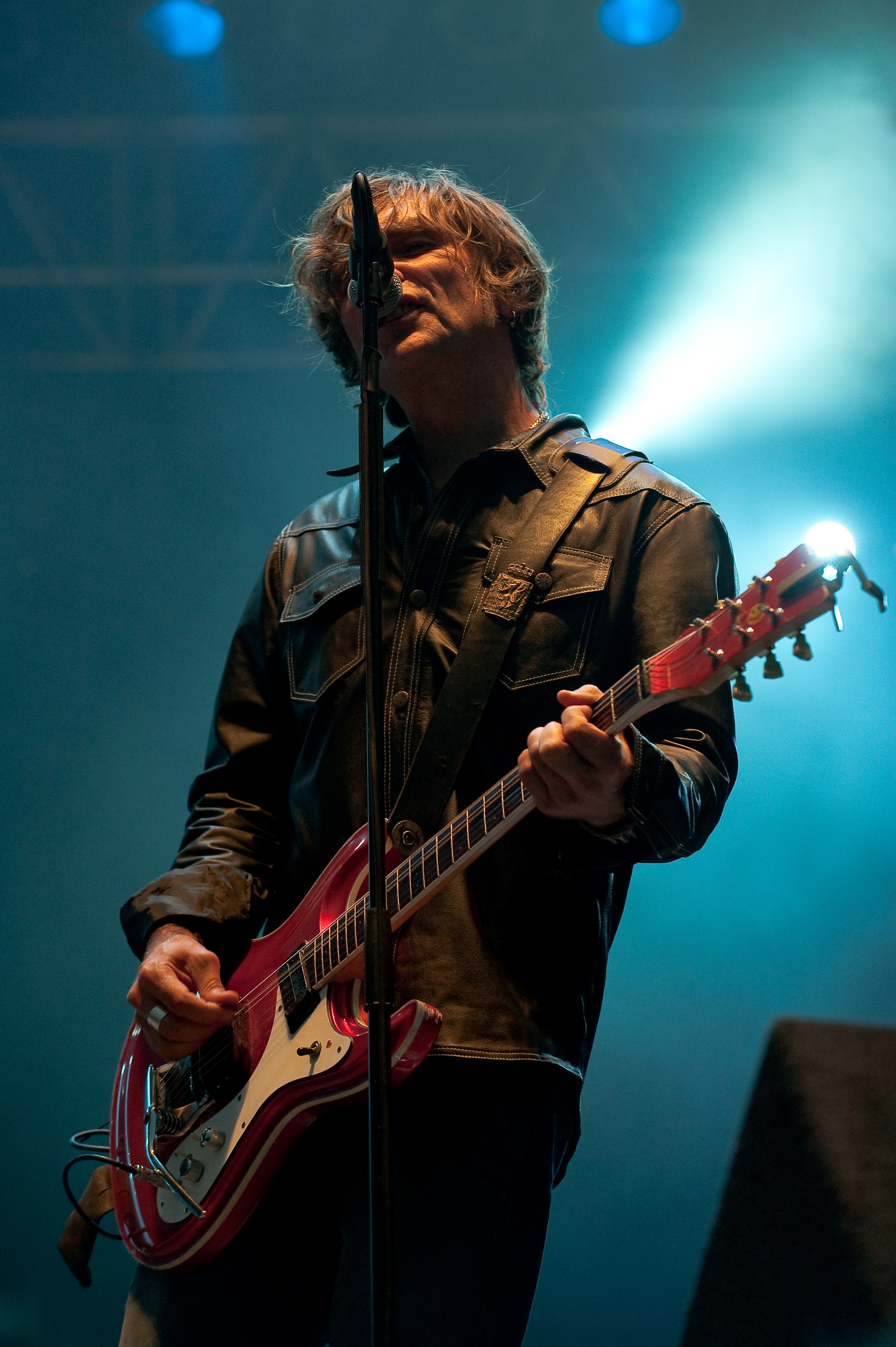
Kristiansen at Døgnvill in 2009.

== Selected discography ==
=== With Wannskrækk ===
- 1981: Faen küler treffer aldri riktig (Oh Yeah!)
- 1982: ...Wannskrækk ..12' (Plasma Plater)
- 1986: X-Mas Funeral Party (Knallsyndikatet)

=== With DumDum Boys ===
- 1988: Blodig Alvor (NaNaNaNa) (Columbia)
- 1989: Splitter pine (CBS)
- 1990: Pstereo (CBS)
- 1992: Riff - Wannskrækk 1980–85 (Oh Yeah!), compilation
- 1992: Transit (Oh Yeah!)
- 1994: Ludium (Oh Yeah!)
- 1994: 1001 Watt (Oh Yeah!), live
- 1996: Sus (Oh Yeah!)
- 1998: Totem (Oh Yeah!)
- 2001: Schlägers (Oh Yeah!), compilation
- 2006: Gravitasjon (Oh Yeah!)
- 2009: Tidsmaskin (Oh Yeah!)
- 2012: Ti liv (Oh Yeah!)
- 2018: Armer og Bein (Oh Yeah!)
- 2019: Løsøre (Oh Yeah!)

=== With Tweeterfriendly Music ===
- 2000: Vol. 1 Maxi Single (Warner Music Norway)
- 2001: Enjoy Tweeterfriendly Music Vol. 2 (Warner Music Norway)
- 2003: Gin & Phonic ***3-03 (Warner Music Norway)
