= Aslak Dørum =

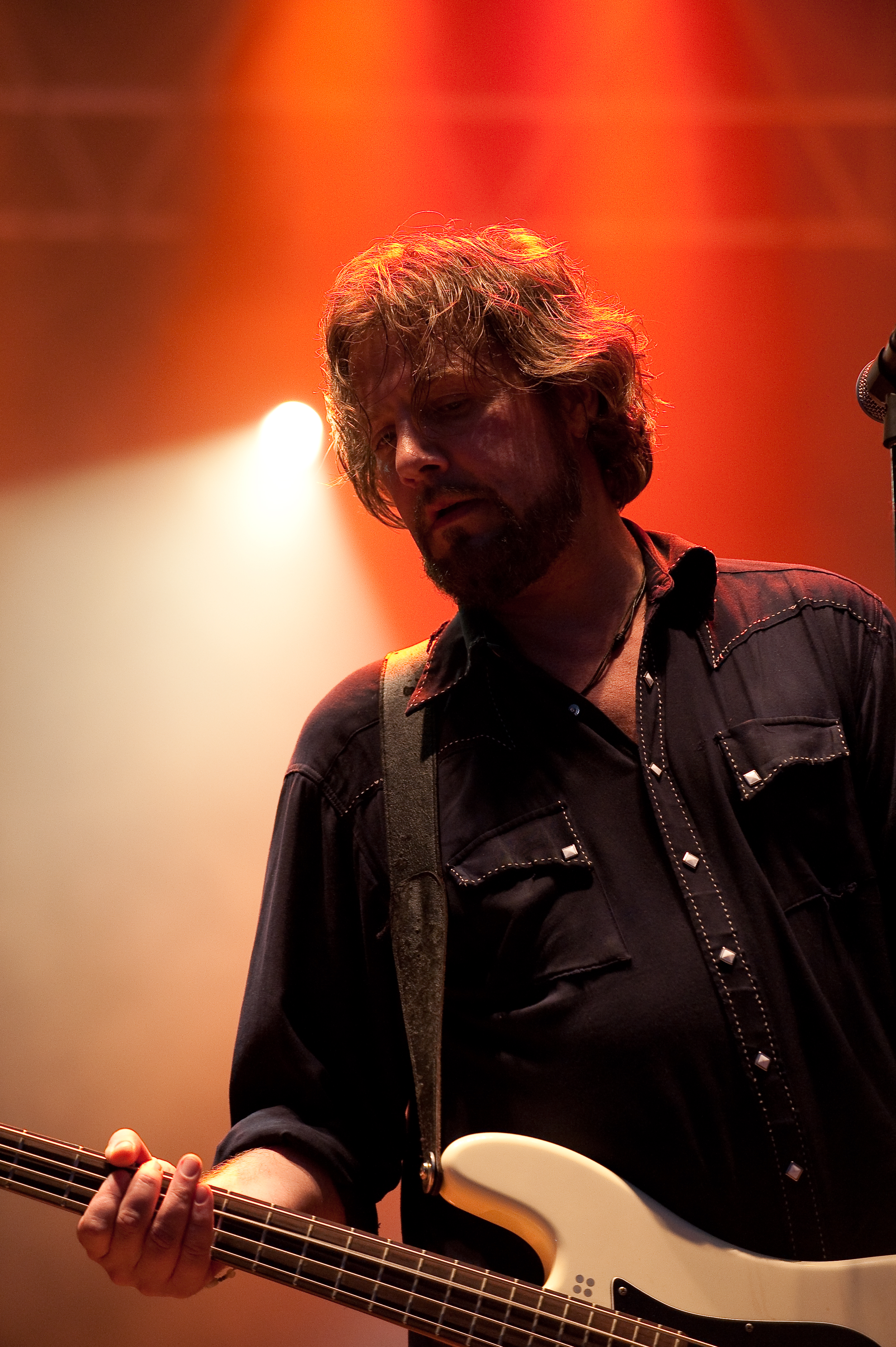
- Dørum performing live with DumDum Boys at Døgnvill, 29 August 2009.

Background information
- Born: 7 August 1964 (age 62); Oslo, Norway
- Instruments: Bass, Guitar, Vocals, Autoharp, Piano
- Member of: DumDum Boys
- Website: www.aschehoug.no/Forfattere/Vaare-forfattere/Aslak_Doerum

Aslak Dørum (born 7 August 1964 in Oslo, Norway) is a Norwegian musician and writer, best known as the bassist of the Norwegian rock band DumDum Boys.

== Career ==
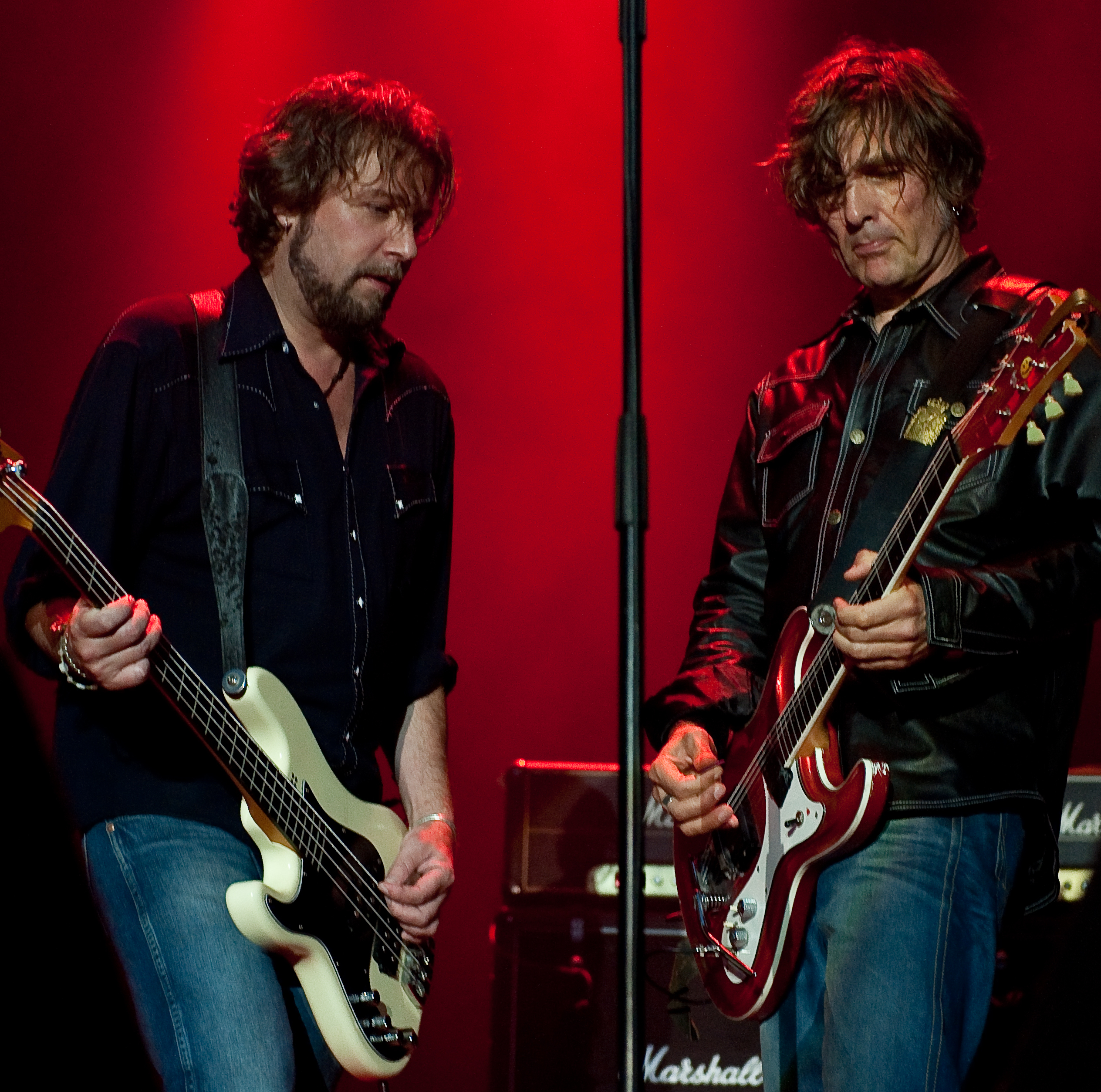
Dørum and Kjartan Kristiansen with DumDum Boys at Døgnvill, 29 August 2009.

Dørum joined DumDum Boys in 1993, after having been closely associated with them for years and directing several of the band's music videos. Dørum and guitarist Kjartan Kristiansen serve as the band's primary songwriters. In 2009, he and Kristiansen was awarded the Spellemann Award in the category This Year's Song for the lyrics to the DumDum Boys song "Tidsmaskin".

Dørum released his debut solo album Lonesome Means Happy in 2005, and in 2013 he released his first novel "En flåte av gull" (A fleet of gold).

== Honors ==
- 2009: Spellemannprisen in the category This Year's Song for the lyrics to the DumDum Boys song "Tidsmaskin"

== Discography ==
=== Solo albums ===
- 2005: Lonesome Means Happy (Bauta Recordings )

=== Collaborations ===
With Follow That Dream

- 1987: Fishing For Success (Thank You Sir May I Have Another Record)
- 1988: Follow That Dream (Thank You Sir May I Have Another Record)

With DumDum Boys

- 1994: Ludium (Oh Yeah!)
- 1994: 1001 Watt (Oh Yeah!)
- 1996: Sus (Oh Yeah!)
- 1997: Stjernesludd (Oh Yeah!)
- 1998: Totem (Oh Yeah!)
- 2006: Gravitasjon (Oh Yeah!)
- 2009: Tidsmaskin (Oh Yeah!)
- 2012: Ti Liv (Oh Yeah!)
- 2018: Armer og Bein (Oh Yeah!)
- 2019: Løsøre (Oh Yeah!)

With Racer

- 1995: Kan Det Være Nødvendig Å Være Så Sint? (Oh No!)
- 1998: Bønda Fra Nord (Oh No!)
- 2000: Bønda Fra Nord 2000 (Oh No!)

With Blister

- 2003: Brand New Antiques (Blister Records)
- 2008: Birthdaysongs (Blister Records)

With other projects

- 2004: Full House (Bergen Records), with Karin Wright
- 2005: Frolic (Capitol Records), with Anneli Drecker on "Strange Little Bird"
- 2006: Desembernatt (CD-R), with Torill Beate Nilsen and Renate Grimsbø Kulbrandstad
