= VG-lista 1961 =

Norwegian music chart

This is a complete list of all the singles that entered the VG-lista - the official Norwegian hit-chart - in 1961. 50 singles entered the VG-lista in 1961 altogether and these are all listed below according to how well they have charted over time.

== Detailed listing of Number-ones in 1961 ==
Week	Artist	Single	Country	Weeks			Straight to #1 ?
Week	Artist	Single	Country	Top 1	Top 10	Top 20	Straight to #1 ?
1	Elvis Presley	"It's Now or Never"	(United States)				
2	Elvis Presley	"It's Now or Never"					
3	Lolita	"Seemann"	(Austria)	9	23		No
4	Lolita	"Seemann"					
5	Lolita	"Seemann"					
6	Lolita	"Seemann"					
7	Lolita	"Seemann"					
8	Lolita	"Seemann"					
9	Lolita	"Seemann"					
10	Lolita	"Seemann"					
11	Lolita	"Seemann"					
12	Robertino	"Romantica"	(Italy)	6	17		No
13	Robertino	"Romantica"					
14	Robertino	"Romantica"					
15	Robertino	"Romantica"					
16	Robertino	"Romantica"					
17	Robertino	"Romantica"					
18	The Allisons	"Are You Sure?"	(United Kingdom)	5	14		No
19	The Allisons	"Are You Sure?"					
20	The Allisons	"Are You Sure?"					
21	The Allisons	"Are You Sure?"					
22	The Allisons	"Are You Sure?"					
23	The Brothers Four	"Greenfields"	(United States)	5	23		No
24	The Brothers Four	"Greenfields"					
25	The Brothers Four	"Greenfields"					
26	The Brothers Four	"Greenfields"					
27	The Brothers Four	"Greenfields"					
28	Ricky Nelson	"Hello Mary Lou/Travellin' Man"	(United States)	14	24		No
29	Ricky Nelson	"Hello Mary Lou/Travellin' Man"					
30	Ricky Nelson	"Hello Mary Lou/Travellin' Man"					
31	Ricky Nelson	"Hello Mary Lou/Travellin' Man"					
32	Ricky Nelson	"Hello Mary Lou/Travellin' Man"					
33	Ricky Nelson	"Hello Mary Lou/Travellin' Man"					
34	Ricky Nelson	"Hello Mary Lou/Travellin' Man"					
35	Ricky Nelson	"Hello Mary Lou/Travellin' Man"					
36	Ricky Nelson	"Hello Mary Lou/Travellin' Man"					
37	Ricky Nelson	"Hello Mary Lou/Travellin' Man"					
38	Ricky Nelson	"Hello Mary Lou/Travellin' Man"					
39	Ricky Nelson	"Hello Mary Lou/Travellin' Man"					
40	Ricky Nelson	"Hello Mary Lou/Travellin' Man"					
41	Ricky Nelson	"Hello Mary Lou/Travellin' Man"					
42	The Highwaymen	"Michael"	(United States)	5	15		No
43	The Highwaymen	"Michael"					
44	The Highwaymen	"Michael"					
45	The Highwaymen	"Michael"					
46	The Highwaymen	"Michael"					
47	Cliff Richard	"When the Girl In Your Arms is the Girl In Your Heart"	(United Kingdom)	8	12		No
48	Cliff Richard	"When the Girl In Your Arms is the Girl In Your Heart"					
49	Cliff Richard	"When the Girl In Your Arms is the Girl In Your Heart"					
50	Cliff Richard	"When the Girl In Your Arms is the Girl In Your Heart"					
51	Cliff Richard	"When the Girl In Your Arms is the Girl In Your Heart"					
52	Cliff Richard	"When the Girl In Your Arms is the Girl In Your Heart"					

== Top singles of 1961 ==
Position	Artist	Song title	Highest position	Points
1	Ricky Nelson	"Hello Mary Lou"	1	446
2	The Brothers Four	"Greenfields"	1	397
3	Robertino	"O sole mio"	2	329
4	Elvis Presley	"Wooden Heart"	3	313
5	Robertino	"Romantica"	1	297
6	Ray Adams	"Violetta"	3	283
7	Elvis Presley	"Surrender"	2	280
8	The Highwaymen	"Michael Row the Boat Ashore"	1	267
9	Buzz Clifford	"Babysitter-Boogie"	4	259
10	Elvis Presley	"Are You Lonesome To-Night?"	3	251
11	The Allisons	"Are You Sure"	1	246
12	Die Blue Diamonds	"Ramona"	2	231
13	The Monn Keys	"Åh Marie, jeg vil hjem"	2	221
14	Eddie Hodges	"I'm Gonna Knock On Your Door"	2	220
15	Cliff Richard	"When the Girl In Your Arms is the Girl In Your Heart"	1	219
16	Cliff Richard & The Shadows	"A Girl Like You"	2	201
17	Pat Boone	"Moody River"	4	191
18	Blue Diamonds	"Down by the Riverside"	2	181
19	Helen Shapiro	"Walkin' Back to Happiness"	3	170
20	The Monn Keys	"Sucu Sucu"	4	164
21	Jay Epae	"Putti Putti"	2	163
22	Clarence "Frogman" Henry	"(I Don't Know Why) But I Do"	3	159
23	Jan Høiland	"Sjømann"	2	146
24	Helen Shapiro	"You Don't Know"	2	139
25	John Leyton	"Johnny Remember Me"	4	132
25	The String-A-Longs	"Wheels"	4	132
27	The Marcels	"Blue Moon"	4	126
28	Del Shannon	"Runaway"	4	114
29	Inger Jacobsen	"Han er endelig, endelig min"	5	107
30	Johnny Burnette	"You're Sixteen - You're Beautiful (And You're Mine)"	6	96
31	Elvis Presley	"Little Sister"	6	91
32	Elvis Presley	"His Latest Flame"	4	89
33	Troy Shondell	"This Time"	4	87
34	Johnny Tillotson	"Poetry in Motion"	4	86
35	Jørgen Ingmann	"Pepe"	6	80
36	Frankie Vaughan	"Tower of Strength"	5	73
37	The Four Jacks	"Oh Marie, jeg vil hjem til dig"	8	72
38	Petula Clark	"Romeo"	7	71
39	Jimmy Dean	"Big Bad John"	6	68
39	The Shadows	"Kon-Tiki"	7	68
41	Alice & Titti Babs	"Nattens underland"	4	54
42	Craig Douglas	"A Hundred Pounds of Clay"	8	38
43	Johnny Horton	"North to Alaska"	8	34
43	Dario Campeotto	"Angelique"	9	34
45	The Everly Brothers	"Walk Right Back"	10	22
46	Nora Brockstedt	"Du mener vel alvor, Halvor?"	10	11
46	The Brothers Four	"The Green Leaves of Summer"	10	11
46	Lonnie Donegan	"Michael Row the Boat Ashore"	10	11
46	Don Gibson	"Sea of Heartbreak"	10	11
46	Jerry Lee Lewis	"What'd I Say"	10	11
