= Møkkamann =

Single by Plumbo

from the album Råkk'n Råll Harry
- Released: 2010
- Recorded: 2010
- Genre: Rock

Plumbo singles chronology
"Møkkamann" (2010)	"Ola Nordmann" (2012)

Music video
- "Møkkamann" on YouTube

"Møkkamann" is a major hit by the Norwegian rock / folk band Plumbo from their third studio album Råkk'n Råll Harry that was released in 2010. In 2011, it became their biggest single the 2011 hit "Møkkamann" from the album that reached No. 1 in the Norwegian Singles Chart. The band received a trophy based on votes from the general public.

== Spellemannprisen ==
In a ceremony held on 14 January 2012, for the annual Spellemannprisen, "Møkkamann" won the prize for best hit of the year. During the thank you-speech, the band's vocalist Lars Erik Blokhus made a joke to Tshawe Baqwa and Yosef Wolde-Mariam of the Norwegian hip-hop group Madcon; "Når jeg ser på deg får plutselig låta nytt navn, Mokkamann." (meaning in Norwegian: When I look at you, the song gets a whole new name, Mocha man."), which was widely received as racist and sparked vast outrage.

== Charts ==
The single didn't chart when it was initially released in 2010.

A release in summer of 2011 proved far more successful and the single reached No. 8 (week 33/2011) in the VG-lista, the official Norwegian Singles Chart, spending a span of 12 weeks (weeks 30 to 47/2011) mostly in the Top 20 (just one week in the Top 10).

With the song winning the Spellemannprisen best hit of the year, the single enjoyed an even greater popularity reappearing in the charts in January 2012, reaching No. 1 on the VG-lista in chart for week 4/2012.

Chart (2010–2011-2012)	Peak position
Norway (VG-lista)	1
