= DumDum Boys =

Norwegian rock band

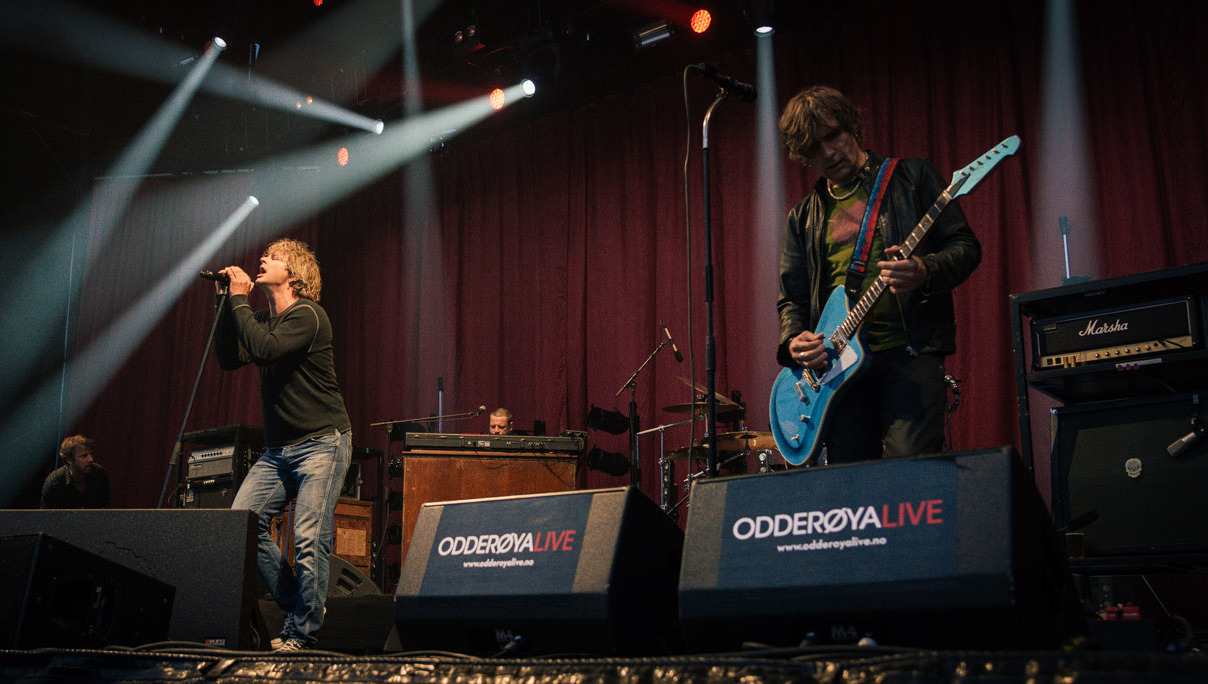
- Dumdum Boys performing at Odderøya Live in 2013

Background information
- Also known as: Wannskrækk (1979–1985)
- Origin: Trondheim, Norway
- Genres: Rock
- Years active: 1979–present
- Labels: Sony Music (1985–1992); Oh! Yeah (1992–present)
- Members: Prepple Houmb; Kjartan Kristiansen; Aslak Dørum; Sola Jonsen
- Past members: Persi Iveland; Atle Karlsen
- Website: www.dumdumboys.no

DumDum Boys are a Norwegian rock band from Trondheim, formed in 1979 and originally known as Wannskrækk. The band is one of the most successful Norwegian rock acts of all time, and are considered one of the "big four" bands who popularized modern rock with Norwegian lyrics in the 1980s alongside Jokke & Valentinerne, Raga Rockers and DeLillos.

== History ==
=== 1979–1985: Formation and early years ===
DumDum Boys was formed in Trondheim in the late 1970s as a punk rock act under the name Wannskrækk by guitarist Kjartan Kristiansen and bassist Per Christian "Persi" Iveland, with vocalist Per Øivind "Prepple" Houmb joining in 1979 and drummer Sola Jonsen in 1982. (Note: Sources variably describe their founding as either 1978 or 1979. Their official website states 1979.) The band was inspired by other Norwegian acts such as Lasse Myrvold and The Aller Værste!, who pioneered punk rock with Norwegian lyrics. The band played gigs extensively in Trondheim and soon gained a cult following. Wannskrækk released two singles, Faen Kuler Treffer Aldri Riktig (1981) and " ...12"... " (1982), before they in 1985 adopted a more mainstream, rock sound and took the name DumDum Boys after the song by Iggy Pop from his album The Idiot.

=== 1986–1989: Blodig Alvor and Splitter Pine ===
In 1986, the band released their debut single "Sorgenfri" and debut EP Bapshuari as DumDum Boys, and relocates to Oslo. The band's debut studio album, Blodig Alvor, was released in 1988 and peaked at the Norwegian charts at number 14. DumDum Boys later received the Spellemann Award in the Rock category for the album. The band's sophomore album, Splitter Pine, was released in 1989 and peaked at number three on the charts. The album earned DumDum Boys a second Spellemann award and was also certified gold.

=== 1990–1994: Pstereo, Transit and Ludium ===
In 1990, keyboardist Atle Karlsen officially joined the band, having previously contributed to Splitter Pine, and composed the soundtrack for the movie Døden på Oslo S together with Kristiansen. The band's third album, Pstereo, was released that same year, with the band being awarded the Spellemann award in the Rock category for a third consecutive year. In 1992, a Wannskrækk compilation album titled Wannskrækk - Riff (1980-1985) was released, consisting of previously released and unreleased material from that time period. Later that year, DumDum Boys released their fourth studio album, Transit. The album proved to be both a critical and commercial success, with the band also being awarded the Spellemann of the Year award. Following the album's release, the band went on an extended break due to tension and conflict within the band. In 1993, founding member and bassist Iveland left the band and was replaced by Aslak Dørum. The band's fifth album, Ludium, and first live album, 1001 Watt, was both released the following year.

=== 1995–1998: Sus and Totem ===
In 1995, DumDum Boys took a new break, while the band members also formed the side-project Racer. The following year, the album Sus was released, having been recorded in Melbourne, Australia. In early 1998, the band released the album Totem to mixed reviews. Towards the end of the year, the band decides to go on an indefinite hiatus.

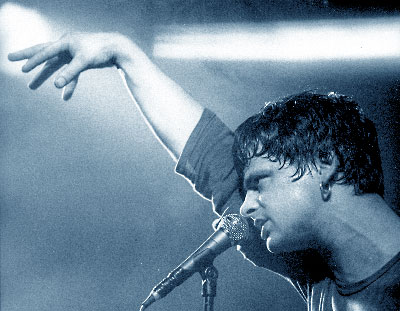
Prepple performing in Halden in 2004.

=== 1999–2004: Hiatus, Schlägers and reunion ===
During the band's hiatus, the members focused on different musical projects, while the compilation album Schlägers was released in 2001. In 2003, the members performed live together for the first time in almost five years during a Racer show in Trondheim, and later reunited as DumDum Boys for an appearance at that year's Norwegian Wood festival. A recording of the performance was later released on the video album DumDum Boys i Dødens Dal in 2004.

=== 2005–2010: Gravitasjon and Tidsmaskin ===
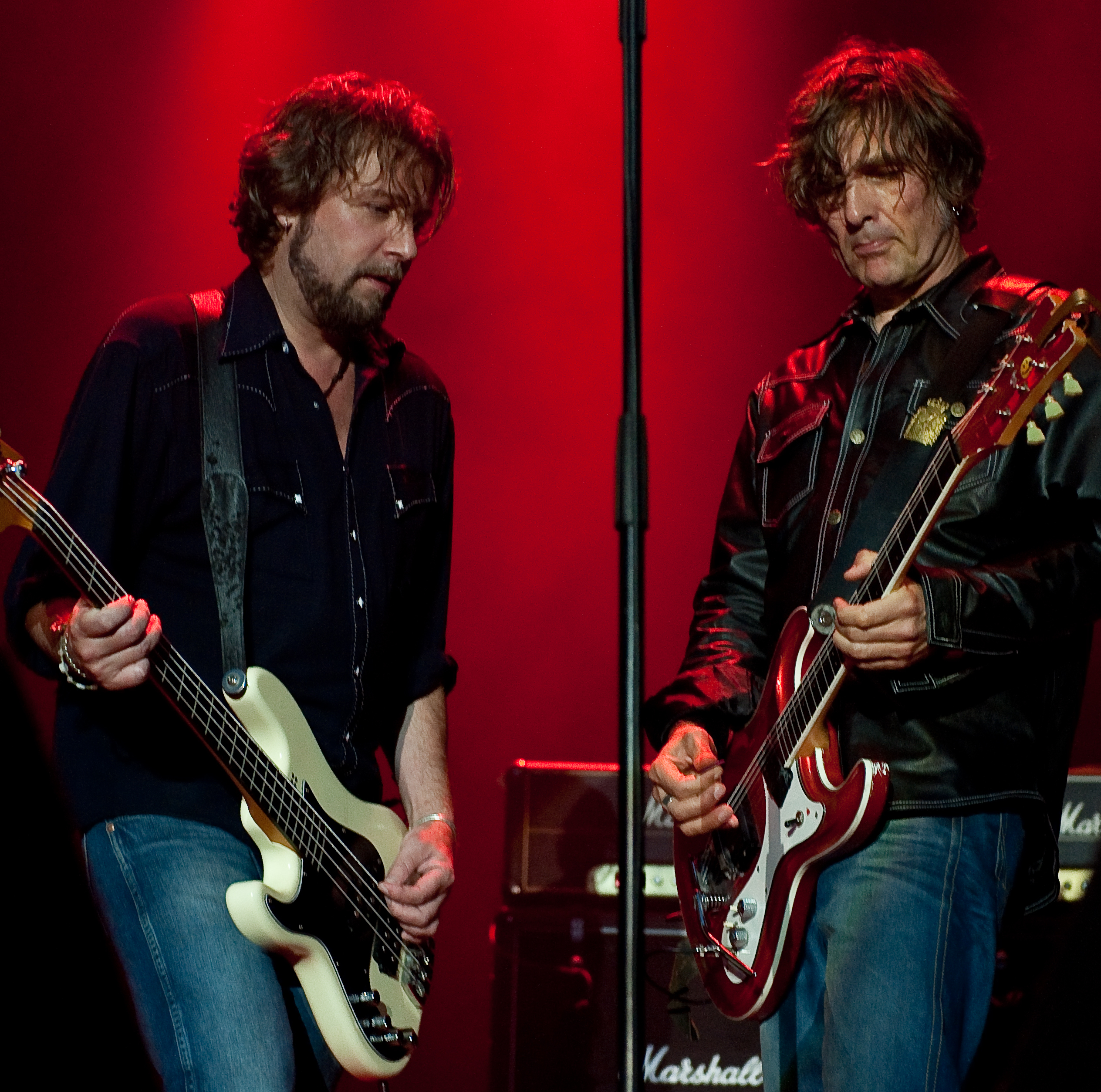
Aslak Dørum and Kjartan Kristiansen performing in Tromsø in 2009.

Throughout 2005, the band toured Norway and recorded a comeback album. DumDum Boys' first album in eight years, Gravitasjon, was released in March 2006. The album debuted at number one on the Norwegian charts and sold over 80,000 copies. In 2007, the band took a new break, during which keyboardist Karlsen departed DumDum Boys after 18 years with the band. DumDum Boys returned to touring in the autumn of 2007. The next two years, the band toured and recorded their follow-up album to Gravitasjon. In November 2009, the album Tidsmaskin was released. The band subsequently toured in support of the album the following year, while Kristiansen and Dørum received the Spellemann award in the category This Year's Song for the title track's lyrics.

=== 2011–2016: Ti Liv and touring ===
In 2011, Prepple, Kristiansen, Iveland and Jonsen reunited as Wannskrækk for two shows in the summer. In August of that year, DumDum Boys performed "Tyven tyven" at the national memorial ceremony for the victims of the 22 July attacks. The band's tenth studio album, Ti Liv, was released in May 2012. DumDum Boys toured Norway the following years and released the single "Tid & Sted / Har Det På Tunga" in 2015.

=== 2017–present: Armer og Bein and Løsøre ===
In 2017, the band entered the studio to record a new album and later released the single "Torden i det fjern" in November. The album Armer og Bein was released in October 2018. The following year, DumDum Boys released the compilation album Løsøre. In 2020, DumDum Boys were forced to cancel their planned tour due to the COVID-19 pandemic. The band resumed touring following the lifting of the national restrictions in Norway.

== Band members ==
Current members

- Per Øivind "Prepple" Houmb – lead vocals (1979–present)
- Kjartan Kristiansen – guitars, backing vocals (1979–present)
- Aslak Dørum – bass, backing vocals (1993–present)
- Sola Jonsen – drums, backing vocals (1982–present)

Former members

- Per Christian "Persi" Iveland – bass, backing vocals (1979–1993)
- Atle Karlsen – keyboards, backing vocals (1989–2007)

== Discography ==
=== Studio albums ===
- Blodig Alvor (NaNaNaNa) (1988)
- Splitter Pine (1989)
- Pstereo (1990)
- Transit (1992)
- Ludium (1994)
- Sus (1996)
- Totem (1998)
- Gravitasjon (2006)
- Tidsmaskin (2009)
- Ti Liv (2012)
- Armer og bein (2018)

=== Live albums ===
- 1001 Watt (1994)
- Rødøye (Live at Rockefeller) (2023)

=== Compilation albums ===
- Schlägers (2001)
- Løsøre (2019)

=== EPs ===
- Bapshuari (1986)

=== Video albums ===
- DumDum Boys i Dødens Dal (2004)
