= Erling Stordahl =

Norwegian singer (1923–1994)

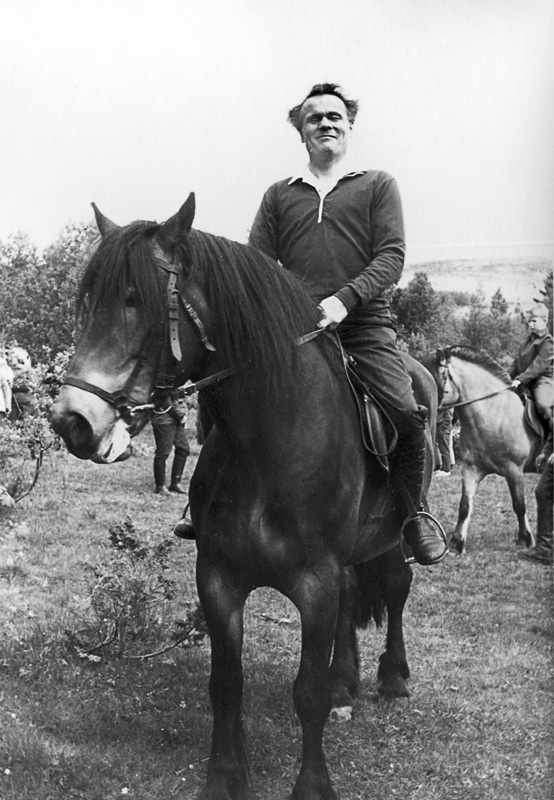
Erling Stordahl

Erling Stordahl (1 August 1923 – 31 October 1994) was a Norwegian farmer and singer.

He is best known for the around 120 songs he recorded throughout 17 years from 1951 together with Gunnar Engedahl. They met at the Norwegian Association of the Blind and Partially Sighted, and made their first hit as a duo in 1951, produced by Odeon.

Erling Stordahl claimed the family line of Norway's King Magnus the Blind. His cultural leadership continued after his recording career. He raised the money to found the Beitostølen Health Sports Centre, for the handicapped children and adults of Europe, in one evening telethon, a part of the Norwegian Red Feather campaign. He also founded the Stordahl Centre for Art and Culture, and presided as chair of the United Nations' International Year for the Handicapped.

The yearly Ridderrennet at Beitostølen in Norway was also established by Erling Stordahl. When Ridderrennet travelled to Minneapolis, Minnesota, Stordahl inspired the blind cross country skier Diane Ziegler, who founded the Association for Blind Living and Education (ABLE), Out of Sight Clubs, and celebrity fashion shows for the blind and sighted. Stordahl's approach to recreation for the handicapped was also a model for the Sons of Norway Ski for Light program brought to the United States by Olav Pedersen.

Awards
| Preceded by Erik Bye | Recipient of the Peer Gynt Prize; 1975 | Succeeded by Øivind Bergh |
| Preceded by Sonja Hagemann | Recipient of the Norsk kulturråds ærespris 1981 | Succeeded by Halldis Moren Vesaas |
