= Gunnar Engedahl =

Norwegian singer

Gunnar Engedahl (10 December 1919 – 23 March 1969) was a Norwegian singer. Best known for the around 120 songs he recorded throughout 17 years from 1951 together with Erling Stordahl (1923–94). They met at Norwegian Association of the Blind and Partially Sighted and made their first hit as a duo in 1951, produced by Odeon. Erling Stordahl wrote many of the songs, but Gunnar Engedahl's voice is the more noted of the pair.
