= Idol (Norwegian TV series) season 3 =

Idol
- Season 3
- Hosted by: Solveig Kloppen; Kåre Magnus Bergh
- Judges: Tone-Lise Skagefoss; Ole Evenrud; Morten Ståle Nilsen; David Eriksen
- Winner: Jorun Stiansen
- Runner-up: Tone Damli Aaberge
- Finals venue: Chateau Neuf

Release
- Original network: TV 2
- Original release: January 2005 – May 20, 2005

Season chronology
- ← Previous; Season 2 Next → Season 4

Idol: Jakten på en superstjerne 2005 was the third season of Idol Norway based on the British singing competition Pop Idol. It began one year after the second season and was aired in the first half of 2005.

Ingrid Gjessing was replaced by Kåre Magnus Bergh and with Jan Fredrik Karlsen's departure the entire judging panel was changed with Tone-Lise Skagefoss becoming the new jury foreperson.

It was also the first time that two girls faced off each other in the final 2 showdown making Jorun Stiansen the first female winner over Tone Damli Aaberge. Aaberge would attempt to represent Norway in the Eurovision Song Contest in 2009 where she ended up being the runner-up, this time to Alexander Rybak who later went on to win the contest. Ironically Rybak has also been a contestant on Idol 2005 and in the same semifinal group as Aaberge. However while Aaberge went on winning her group, Rybak did not even manage to reach the top 5 and therefore missed out a spot in the group of final 12.

Second runner-up Alejandro Fuentes was able to top VG-lista (Norwegian Single Charts) three times between 2005 and 2007. One if these no. 1 Hits was a collaboration with Askil Holm, Espen Lind and Kurt Nilsen (winner of season one). The quartet also went on tour under the name The New Guitar Buddies.

== Finals ==
=== Finalists ===
(ages stated at time of contest)

Contestant	Age	Hometown	Voted Off	Liveshow Theme
Jorun Stiansen	21	Vennesla	Winner	Grand Finale
Tone Damli Aaberge	17	Sogndal	May 20, 2005	Grand Finale
Alejandro Fuentes	18	Kristiansand	May 13, 2005	Judge's choice
Erik Flaa	21	Bærum	May 6, 2005	Duets
Christian Stenseng	21	Haslum	April 29, 2005	Big Band
Eva Weel Skram	19	Sogndal	April 22, 2005	Beatles
Cindy Hovde	18	Sætre	April 15, 2005	Country
Mari Vestbø	18	Ølen	April 8, 2005	Birth Year
Malin Pettersen	17	Hasle	April 1, 2005	Movie Songs
David Bakke	20	Moss	March 18, 2005	Soul & R'n'B
Andrea Gjendem Brændvik	20	Son	March 11, 2005	Made in Norway
Bjørn Olav Edvardsen	22	Tromøya	March 4, 2005	Contestant's Choice

== Elimination Chart ==
Legend
Did Not Perform	Female	Male	Top 40	Wild Card	Top 12	Winner

Safe	Bottom 3	Bottom 2	Eliminated

Stage:		Semi					Wild; Card	Finals										
Week:		02/10	02/16	02/18	02/23	02/25	Wild; Card	03/04	03/11	03/18	04/01	04/08	04/15	04/22	04/29	05/06	05/13	05/20
Place	Contestant	Result																
1	Jorun Stiansen		44%															Winner
2	Tone Damli Aaberge					27%												Runner-Up
3	Alejandro Fuentes			33%													Elim	
4	Erik Flaa					15%	Saved		Btm 2		Btm 3	Btm 2		Btm 2		Elim		
5	Christian Stenseng					19%				Btm 3		Btm 3	Btm 2	Btm 3	Elim			
6	Eva Weel Skram	24%								Btm 2			Btm 3	Elim				
7	Cindy Hovde				17%								Elim					
8	Mari Vestbø			19%				Btm 2			Btm 2	Elim						
9	Malin Pettersen				22%				Btm 3		Elim							
10	David Bakke	21%					Saved	Btm 3		Elim								
11	Andrea Gjendem Brændvik	23%							Elim									
12	Bjørn Olav Edvardsen		21%					Elim										
Semi- Final 5	Thomas Frantzen					14%												
Semi- Final 5	Amalie Olsen					8%												
Semi- Final 5	Ailin Claussen					Elim												
Semi- Final 5	Alexander Rybak					Elim												
Semi- Final 5	Kaja Nordeng					Elim												
Semi- Final 5	Sofie Storaas					Elim												
Semi- Final 5	Thi Tran					Elim												
Semi- Final 4	Maria Thoresen				16%													
Semi- Final 4	Knut Marius Djupvik				15%													
Semi- Final 4	Haji Saleem				11%													
Semi- Final 4	Carina O. Olsen				Elim													
Semi- Final 4	Erik Auklend				Elim													
Semi- Final 4	Kine Jeanette Hanssen				Elim													
Semi- Final 4	Kristoffer Johannessen				Elim													
Semi- Final 4	Mari Elisabeth Sandberg				Elim													
Semi- Final 3	Patrick Sagen			11%														
Semi- Final 3	Kent Storstad			10%														
Semi- Final 3	Henriette Helgeland Tangen			7%														
Semi- Final 3	Charlotte Gundersen			Elim														
Semi- Final 3	Christine Valencia Kjøsnes			Elim														
Semi- Final 3	Inga Merethe Fjerdingstad			Elim														
Semi- Final 3	Katrine H. Vatle			Elim														
Semi- Final 3	Lars Sars Uppman			Elim														
Semi- Final 2	Thommas Rene Hetlevik		10%															
Semi- Final 2	Ragnhild H. Ulleberg		5%															
Semi- Final 2	Willy Sharma		4%															
Semi- Final 2	Cherry Marie Evanger		Elim															
Semi- Final 2	Christina Maria Alvarez		Elim															
Semi- Final 2	Karoline Johansen		Elim															
Semi- Final 2	Magnus Granholt		Elim															
Semi- Final 2	Mariann Svendsen		Elim															
Semi- Final 1	Felipe Munoz	11%																
Semi- Final 1	Thomas Seeberg	7%																
Semi- Final 1	Marie Basmo	Elim																
Semi- Final 1	Magdalena Nilsson	Elim																
Semi- Final 1	Mia Aadland Stølen	Elim																
Semi- Final 1	Øystein Holm Larsen	Elim																
Semi- Final 1	Sita Pariyar	Elim																

=== Live show details ===
==== Heat 1 (February 11, 2005) ====
Order	Artist	Song (original artists)	Result
1	Mia Aadland Stølen	"Hands Clean" (Alanis Morissette)	Eliminated
2	Felipe Munoz	"This I Promise You" (NSYNC)	Eliminated
3	Magdalena Nilsson	"I Turn to You" (Christina Aguilera)	Eliminated
4	Øystein Holm Larsen	"Feel" (Robbie Williams)	Eliminated
5	Marie Basmo	"Wonderwall" (Oasis)	Eliminated
6	Sita Pariyer	"Killing Me Softly" (The Fugees)	Eliminated
7	Thomas Seeberg	"Bright Lights" (Matchbox Twenty)	Eliminated
8	Eva Weel Skram	"Somewhere Only We Know" (Keane)	Advanced
9	David Bakke	"Right Here Waiting" (Richard Marx)	Eliminated
10	Andrea Gjendem Brændvik	"Black Velvet" (Alannah Myles)	Advanced

==== Heat 2 (February 16, 2005) ====
Order	Artist	Song (original artists)	Result
1	Ragnhild H. Ulleberg	"Stop!" (Sam Brown)	Eliminated
2	Thomas René Hetlevik	"You and I Both" (Jason Mraz)	Eliminated
3	Christina Maria Alvarez	"(You Make Me Feel Like) A Natural Woman" (Aretha Franklin)	Eliminated
4	Magnus Granholt	"Amazed" (Lonestar)	Eliminated
5	Cherry Marie Evanger	"Do I Need a Reason" (D'Sound)	Eliminated
6	Karoline Johansen	"Love Shine a Light" (Katrina and the Waves)	Eliminated
7	Willy Sharma	"When a Man Loves a Woman" (Percy Sledge)	Eliminated
8	Jorun Stiansen	"Run to You" (Whitney Houston)	Advanced
9	Bjørn Olav Edvardsen	"I Can't Help Myself" (The Kelly Family)	Advanced
10	Mariann Svendsen	"Unforgivable Sinner" (Lene Marlin)	Eliminated

==== Heat 3 (February 18, 2005) ====
Order	Artist	Song (original artists)	Result
1	Inga Merethe Fjerdingstad	"Reflection" (Christina Aguilera)	Eliminated
2	Kent Storstad	"Real to Me" (Brian McFadden)	Eliminated
3	Charlotte Gundersen	"Ain't No Sunshine" (Bill Withers)	Eliminated
4	Patrick Sagen	"Desperado" (Eagles)	Eliminated
5	Katrine H. Vatle	"Have I Told You Lately" (Rod Stewart)	Eliminated
6	Christine Valencia Kjøsnes	"The Voice Within" (Christina Aguilera)	Eliminated
7	Lars Sars Uppman	"The Reason" (Hoobastank)	Eliminated
8	Henriette Helgeland Tangen	"(You Make Me Feel Like) A Natural Woman" (Aretha Franklin)	Eliminated
9	Alejandro Fuentes	"This Year's Love" (David Gray)	Advanced
10	Mari Vestbø	"Laura" (Scissor Sisters)	Advanced

==== Heat 4 (February 23, 2005) ====
Order	Artist	Song (original artists)	Result
1	Cindy Hovde	"A Moment Like This" (Kelly Clarkson)	Advanced
2	Kristoffer Johannessen	"Go the Distance" (Michael Bolton)	Eliminated
3	Carina O. Olsen	"You Might Need Somebody" (Shola Ama)	Eliminated
4	Erik Auklend	"I Believe I Can Fly" (R. Kelly)	Eliminated
5	Mari Elisabeth Sandberg	"Crawling up a Hill" (Katie Melua)	Eliminated
6	Kine Jeanette Hanssen	"Don't Speak" (No Doubt)	Eliminated
7	Knut Marius Djupvik	"(Everything I Do) I Do It for You" (Bryan Adams)	Eliminated
8	Malin Pettersen	"The Closest Thing to Crazy" (Katie Melua)	Advanced
9	Haji Saleem	"End of the Road" (Boyz II Men)	Eliminated
10	Maria Thoresen	"The Voice Within" (Christina Aguilera)	Eliminated

==== Heat 5 (February 25, 2005) ====
Order	Artist	Song (original artists)	Result
1	Amalie Olsen	"You Oughta Know" (Alanis Morissette)	Eliminated
2	Alexander Rybak	"Your Song" (Elton John)	Eliminated
3	Ailin Claussen	"Walk On By" (Dionne Warwick)	Eliminated
4	Thomas Frantzen	"All or Nothing" (O-Town)	Eliminated
5	Thi Tran	"The Greatest Love of All" (Whitney Houston)	Eliminated
6	Kaja Nordeng	"Zombie" (The Cranberries)	Eliminated
7	Erik Flaa	"Hallelujah" (Leonard Cohen)	Eliminated
8	Tone Damli Aaberge	"Sunday Morning" (Maroon 5)	Advanced
9	Christian Stenseng	"She Will Be Loved" (Maroon 5)	Advanced
10	Sofie Storaas	"Unintended" (Muse)	Eliminated

==== Live Show 1 (March 4, 2005) ====
Theme: Your Idol

Order	Artist	Song (original artists)	Result
1	Malin Pettersen	"Turn Me On" (Norah Jones)	Safe
2	Bjørn Olav Edvardsen	"Señorita" (Justin Timberlake)	Eliminated
3	Tone Damli Aaberge	"Don't Know Why" (Norah Jones)	Safe
4	Mari Vestbø	"Nobody's Wife" (Anouk)	Bottom two
5	David Bakke	"My Girl" (The Temptations)	Bottom three
6	Cindy Hovde	"Saving All My Love for You" (Whitney Houston)	Safe
7	Christian Stenseng	"Rock DJ" (Robbie Williams)	Safe
8	Jorun Stiansen	"If I Ain't Got You" (Alicia Keys)	Safe
9	Erik Flaa	"Summer Moved On" (A-ha)	Safe
10	Eva Weel Skram	"Lovefool" (The Cardigans)	Safe
11	Alejandro Fuentes	"She Will Be Loved" (Maroon 5)	Safe
12	Andrea Gjendem Brændvik	"Kiss" (Venke Knutson)	Safe

==== Live Show 2 (March 11, 2005) ====
Theme: Made in Norway

Order	Artist	Song (original artists)	Result
1	Eva Weel Skram	"Two Way Monologue" (Sondre Lerche)	Safe
2	Andrea Gjendem Brændvik	"My Lullaby" (Maria Mena)	Eliminated
3	Erik Flaa	"My Woman" (Locomotives)	Bottom two
4	Mari Vestbø	"Wide Awake" (Briskeby)	Safe
5	Alejandro Fuentes	"Century" (Erik Faber)	Safe
6	Cindy Hovde	"Burning" (Maria Arredondo)	Safe
7	Tone Damli Aaberge	"Girls Keep Secrets in the Strangest Ways" (Ephemera)	Safe
8	David Bakke	"Baby You're So Cool" (Espen Lind)	Safe
9	Malin Pettersen	"Just a Little Heartache" (Maria Arredondo)	Bottom three
10	Christian Stenseng	"Velvet" (Savoy)	Safe
11	Jorun Stiansen	"Scared" (Venke Knutson)	Safe

==== Live Show 3 (March 18, 2005) ====
Theme: Soul & R&B

Order	Artist	Song (original artists)	Result
1	David Bakke	"Used to Love U" (John Legend)	Eliminated
2	Jorun Stiansen	"Work It Out" (Beyoncé)	Safe
3	Tone Damli Aaberge	"Street Life" (Randy Crawford)	Safe
4	Christian Stenseng	"Isn't She Lovely" (Stevie Wonder)	Bottom three
5	Malin Pettersen	"I Can't Help Myself (Sugar Pie Honey Bunch)" (Four Tops)	Safe
6	Alejandro Fuentes	"My Boo" (Usher & Alicia Keys)	Safe
7	Mari Vestbø	"Some Kind of Wonderful" (Joss Stone)	Safe
8	Eva Weel Skram	"Next Lifetime" (Erykah Badu)	Bottom two
9	Erik Flaa	"(Sittin' On) The Dock of the Bay" (Otis Redding)	Safe
10	Cindy Hovde	"Lady Marmalade" (Christina Aguilera, Pink, Lil' Kim & Mýa)	Safe

==== Live Show 4 (April 1, 2005) ====
Theme: Movie Songs

Order	Artist	Song (original artists)	Result
1	Cindy Hovde	"Flashdance... What a Feeling" (Irene Cara)	Safe
2	Erik Flaa	"Against All Odds (Take a Look at Me Now)" (Phil Collins)	Bottom three
3	Mari Vestbø	"We Are" (Ana Johnsson)	Bottom two
4	Eva Weel Skram	"Tomorrow Never Dies" (Sheryl Crow)	Safe
5	Alejandro Fuentes	"Unchained Melody" (The Righteous Brothers)	Safe
6	Malin Pettersen	"All by Myself" (Celine Dion)	Eliminated
7	Christian Stenseng	"When the Going Gets Tough" (Billy Ocean)	Safe
8	Jorun Stiansen	"Angel" (Sarah McLachlan)	Safe
9	Tone Damli Aaberge	"Kiss Me" (Sixpence None the Richer)	Safe

==== Live Show 5 (April 8, 2005) ====
Theme: Your Birth Year

Order	Artist	Song (original artists)	Result
1	Mari Vestbø	"You Keep Me Hangin' On" (Kim Wilde)	Eliminated
2	Christian Stenseng	"Uptown Girl" (Billy Joel)	Bottom three
3	Tone Damli Aaberge	"Fast Car" (Tracy Chapman)	Safe
4	Jorun Stiansen	"What's Love Got to Do with It" (Tina Turner)	Safe
5	Eva Weel Skram	"The Power of Love" (Jennifer Rush)	Safe
6	Erik Flaa	"Every Breath You Take" (The Police)	Bottom two
7	Cindy Hovde	"I Wanna Dance with Somebody (Who Loves Me)" (Whitney Houston)	Safe
8	Alejandro Fuentes	"Don't Dream It's Over" (Crowded House)	Safe

==== Live Show 6 (April 15, 2005) ====
Theme: Country

Order	Artist	Song (original artists)	Result
1	Tone Damli Aaberge	"Jolene" (Dolly Parton)	Safe
2	Eva Weel Skram	"When You Say Nothing at All" (Alison Krauss)	Bottom three
3	Erik Flaa	"Hurt" (Johnny Cash)	Safe
4	Cindy Hovde	"I Will Always Love You" (Dolly Parton)	Eliminated
5	Alejandro Fuentes	"Desperado" (Eagles)	Safe
6	Jorun Stiansen	"9 to 5" (Dolly Parton)	Safe
7	Christian Stenseng	"Amazed" (Lonestar)	Bottom two

==== Live Show 7 (April 22, 2005) ====
Theme: Beatles

Order	Artist	Song (original artists)	Result
1	Jorun Stiansen	"We Can Work It Out"	Safe
2	Christian Stenseng	"Can't Buy Me Love"	Bottom three
3	Eva Weel Skram	"The Long and Winding Road"	Eliminated
4	Alejandro Fuentes	"Please Mr. Postman"	Safe
5	Tone Damli Aaberge	"Martha My Dear"	Safe
6	Erik Flaa	"Let It Be"	Bottom two

==== Live Show 8 (April 29, 2005) ====
Theme: Big Band

Order	Artist	Song (original artists)	Result
1	Christian Stenseng	"I Get a Kick Out of You" (Frank Sinatra)	Eliminated
2	Jorun Stiansen	"Smile" (Charlie Chaplin)	Safe
3	Alejandro Fuentes	"Beyond the Sea" (Bobby Darin)	Safe
4	Erik Flaa	"Feeling Good" (Nina Simone)	Safe
5	Tone Damli Aaberge	"Sparkling Diamonds" (Nicole Kidman)	Safe

==== Live Show 9 (May 6, 2005) ====
Theme: Duets

Order	Artist	Song (original artists)	Result
1	Tone Damli Aaberge	"The Sun" (Maroon 5)	Safe
2	Erik Flaa	"Bedshaped" (Keane)	Eliminated
3	Jorun Stiansen	"The Greatest Love of All" (Whitney Houston)	Safe
4	Alejandro Fuentes	"Sail Away" (David Gray)	Safe
5	Tone Damli Aaberge & Erik Flaa	"Come What May" (Ewan McGregor & Nicole Kidman)	N/A
6	Jorun Stiansen & Alejandro Fuentes	"Could I Have This Kiss Forever" (Enrique Iglesias & Whitney Houston)	N/A

==== Live Show 10: Semi-final (May 13, 2005) ====
Theme: Judge's Choice

Order	Artist	First song (original artists)	Second song	Result
1	Jorun Stiansen	"Get the Party Started" (Pink)	"Too Lost in You" (Sugababes)	Safe
2	Tone Damli Aaberge	"Songbird" (Eva Cassidy)	"Manic Monday" (The Bangles)	Safe
3	Alejandro Fuentes	"With or Without You" (U2)	"Why Does It Always Rain on Me?" (Travis)	Eliminated

==== Live final (May 20, 2005) ====
Order	Artist	First song	Second song	Third song	Result
1	Tone Damli Aaberge	"Sunday Morning"	"Leave Right Now"	"This Is the Night"	Runner-up
2	Jorun Stiansen	"What's Love Got to Do with It"	"If I Ain't Got You"	"This Is the Night"	Winner
