= Idol (Norwegian TV series) season 1 =

Idol
- Season 1
- Hosted by: Thomas Numme; Harald J. Rønneberg
- Judges: Jan Fredrik Karlsen; Ole Evenrud; Morten Ståle Nilsen; Lena Midtveit
- Winner: Kurt Nilsen
- Runner-up: Gaute Ormåsen
- Finals venue: Chateau Neuf

Release
- Original network: TV 2
- Original release: January 2003 – May 23, 2003

Season chronology
- Next → Season 2

Idol: Jakten på en superstjerne 2003 was the first season of Idol Norway based on the British singing competition Pop Idol. It premiered in January and was aired until May 23, 2003 with Kurt Nilsen winning. A year later he would eventually win World Idol where he competed against 10 Idol winners from other countries.

== Finals ==
=== Finalists ===
Finalist	Age *	From	Status
Jeanette Vik	15	Jessheim	Disqualified in Week 1
Guro Dugstad	23	Bergen	Eliminated 1st in Week 2
Orji Okoroafor	24	Oslo	Eliminated 2nd in Week 3
Linn S. Andersen	16	Bergen	Eliminated 3rd in Week 4
Tone Anette E. Elde	16	Knarvik	Eliminated 4th in Week 5
Espen Grjotheim	26	Oslo	Eliminated 5th in Week 6
Rebecca Ludvigsen	17	Trondheim	Eliminated 6th in Week 7
David Pedersen	16	Andenes	Eliminated 7th in Week 8
Gaute Ormåsen	19	Brumunddal	Runner-up
Kurt Nilsen	24	Bergen	Winner

* as of the start of the season

== Heats and live shows ==
=== Results summary ===
Legend
Did Not Perform	Female	Male	Top 50	Top 10	Winner

Safe	Bottom 3	Bottom 2	Eliminated

Stage:		Semi					Finals								
Week:		02/14	02/21	02/28	03/07	03/14	03/21	03/28	04/04	04/11	04/25	05/02	05/09	05/16	05/23
Place	Contestant	Result													
1	Kurt Nilsen				23 %										Winner
2	Gaute Ormåsen		33 %												Runner-Up
3	David Pedersen				17 %							Btm 2	Btm 2	Elim	
4	Rebecca Ludvigsen			34 %					Btm 2	Btm 3	Btm 3		Elim		
5	Espen Grjotheim					1st		Btm 2			Btm 2	Elim			
6	Tone Anette E. Elde			14 %			Saved			Btm 2	Elim				
7	Linn S. Andersen		20 %				Btm 3	Btm 3	Btm 3	Elim					
8	Orji Okoroafor	1st							Elim						
9	Guro Dugstad	2nd						Elim							
10	Jeanette Vik					21 %	DQ								
Semi- Final 5	Belinda Orten					Elim									
Semi- Final 5	Børge Rømma					Elim									
Semi- Final 5	Cathrine Bjørlo					Elim									
Semi- Final 5	Henning Stranden					Elim									
Semi- Final 5	Lars Petter Sauge					Elim									
Semi- Final 5	Maria Johansen					Elim									
Semi- Final 5	Sølvi Kobbeltvedt					Elim									
Semi- Final 5	Susanne Akerø					Elim									
Semi- Final 4	Anne Nymo Trulsen				Elim										
Semi- Final 4	Christer Mørkved				Elim										
Semi- Final 4	Francesca Strano				Elim										
Semi- Final 4	Heidi Solheim				Elim										
Semi- Final 4	Julie Overvik				Elim										
Semi- Final 4	Silje Hagen				Elim										
Semi- Final 4	Silje Vasvåg				Elim										
Semi- Final 4	Stine Nordeng Andersen				Elim										
Semi- Final 3	Adele Erichsen			Elim											
Semi- Final 3	Ane Launy			Elim											
Semi- Final 3	Cecilie Eikestad			Elim											
Semi- Final 3	Esben André Holm			Elim											
Semi- Final 3	Kristoffer Johannessen			Elim											
Semi- Final 3	Maria Goncalves Braaten			Elim											
Semi- Final 3	Ronny Andrè Klo			Elim											
Semi- Final 3	Stina Eia			Elim											
Semi- Final 2	Birgit Høva		Elim												
Semi- Final 2	Jonas Groth		Elim												
Semi- Final 2	Liv-Jorunn Håker		Elim												
Semi- Final 2	Marte Marie Gjestrum		Elim												
Semi- Final 2	Maurice Adams		Elim												
Semi- Final 2	Mette Mari Leseth		Elim												
Semi- Final 2	Merete Bjerkli		Elim												
Semi- Final 2	Rune Sæter		Elim												
Semi- Final 1	Anette Kristensen	Elim													
Semi- Final 1	Anne Margrethe Lemicka	Elim													
Semi- Final 1	Helene Mølster	Elim													
Semi- Final 1	Lars Sigmund Løfsnæs	Elim													
Semi- Final 1	Lars Øivind Haugen	Elim													
Semi- Final 1	Mette Broback Arntsen	Elim													
Semi- Final 1	Petter Christian Bakke	Elim													
Semi- Final 1	Solvor Woll	Elim													

Notes:

- After the first liveshow, where Jeanette ended up in the bottom 2, she was disqualified for being underage.
- Due to Jeanette being disqualified, Tone was given another chance to return.

=== Live show details ===
==== Heat 1 (14 February 2003) ====
Order	Artist	Song (original artists)	Result
1	Solvor Woll	"Since You've Been Gone" ()	Eliminated
2	Mette Broback Arntsen	"I Have Nothing" (Whitney Houston)	Eliminated
3	Lars Øivind Haugen	"You Need Love Like I Do (Don't You?)" (Tom Jones & Heather Small)	Eliminated
4	Helene Mølster	"Hero" (Mariah Carey)	Eliminated
5	Petter Christian Bakke	"Feel" (Robbie Williams)	Eliminated
6	Anne Margreta Lemicka	"All By Myself" (Celine Dion)	Eliminated
7	Guro Dugstad	"I'll Be There" (The Jackson 5)	Advanced
8	Orji Okoroafor	"Hard to Say I'm Sorry" (Chicago)	Advanced
9	Anette Kristensen	"Stand by Me" (Ben E. King)	Eliminated
10	Lars Sigmund Løfsnes	"Have Fun, Go Mad" (Blair)	Eliminated

==== Heat 2 (21 February 2003) ====
Order	Artist	Song (original artists)	Result
1	Birgit Høva	"Wind Beneath My Wings" (Bette Midler)	Eliminated
2	Maurice Adams	"I Don't Want to Miss a Thing" (Aerosmith)	Eliminated
3	Mette Mari Leseth	"Sorry Seems to Be the Hardest Word" (Elton John)	Eliminated
4	Rune Sæter	"I Wish" ()	Eliminated
5	Linn S. Andersen	"Doubt" (Linn S. Andersen)	Advanced
6	Jonas Groth	"Against All Odds (Take a Look at Me Now)" (Phil Collins)	Eliminated
7	Merete Bjerkell	"Yes" ()	Eliminated
8	Marte Maria Gjestrum	"Can't Take My Eyes Off You" (Andy Williams)	Eliminated
9	Gaute Ormåsen	"If Tomorrow Never Comes" (Ronan Keating)	Advanced
10	Liv-Jorunn Håker Ottesen	"Thank You for the Music" (ABBA)	Eliminated

==== Heat 3 (28 February 2003) ====
Order	Artist	Song (original artists)	Result
1	Ane Launy	"Have Fun, Go Mad" (Blair)	Eliminated
2	Kristoffer Johannessen	"Right Here Waiting" (Richard Marx)	Eliminated
3	Stina Eia	"Goodbye's (The Saddest Word)" (Celine Dion)	Eliminated
4	Cecilie Eikestad	"I Just Want to Make Love to You" (Etta James)	Eliminated
5	Ronny Andre Klo	"Feel" (Robbie Williams)	Eliminated
6	Maria Goncalves Braaten	"Fighter" (Christina Aguilera)	Eliminated
7	Tone Anette E. Elde	"Wish" (Tone Anette E. Elde)	Advanced
8	Esben Andre Holm	"Walking in Memphis" (Marc Cohn)	Eliminated
9	Rebecca Ludvigsen	"Fallin'" (Alicia Keys)	Advanced
10	Adele Erichsen	"I'm Outta Love" (Anastacia)	Eliminated

==== Heat 4 (7 March 2003) ====
Order	Artist	Song (original artists)	Result
1	Silje Hagen	"Beautiful" (Christina Aguilera)	Eliminated
2	Anne Nymo Trulsen	"The Right to Sing" (John Miles)	Eliminated
3	Kurt Nilsen	"Stuck in a Moment You Can't Get Out Of" (U2)	Advanced
4	Julie Overvik	"Your Song" (Elton John)	Eliminated
5	Stina Kordeng Andersen	"Foolish Games" (Jewel)	Eliminated
6	Christer Mørkved	"This Time Around" ()	Eliminated
7	Francesca Strano	"Over the Rainbow" (Judy Garland)	Eliminated
8	David Pedersen	"With Arms Wide Open" (Creed)	Advanced
9	Silje Vasvåg	"Live On" ()	Eliminated
10	Heidi Solheim	"Stop!" (Sam Brown)	Eliminated

==== Heat 5 (14 March 2003) ====
Order	Artist	Song (original artists)	Result
1	Lars Pette Sauge	"Hello" (Lionel Richie)	Eliminated
2	Susanne Akerø	"Unintended" (Muse)	Eliminated
3	Espen Grjotheim	"Time" (Espen Grjotheim)	Advanced
4	Maria Johansen	"Help Me" ()	Eliminated
5	Belinda Orten	"Belinda" ()	Eliminated
6	Børge Rømma	"Amazed" (Lonestar)	Eliminated
7	Cathrine Bjørlo	"Think" (Aretha Franklin)	Eliminated
8	Jeanette Vik	"I Don't Know" (Celine Dion)	Advanced
9	Henning Stranden	"The Max" ()	Eliminated
10	Sølvi Kobbeltvedt	"Son of a Preacher Man" (Dusty Springfield)	Eliminated

==== Live Show 1 (21 March 2003) ====
Theme: Your Idol

Order	Artist	Song (original artists)	Result
1	Rebecca Ludvigsen	"A Deeper Love" (Aretha Franklin)	Safe
2	Orji Okoroafor	"Maria Maria" (Santana)	Safe
3	Tone Anette E. Elde	"Anything About June" (Unni Wilhelmsen)	Eliminated
4	Espen Grjotheim	"I Still Haven't Found What I'm Looking For" (U2)	Safe
5	Linn S. Andersen	"You Were Meant for Me" (Jewel)	Bottom three
6	Kurt Nilsen	"The Day After Tomorrow" (Saybia)	Safe
7	Jeanette Vik	"Think Twice" (Celine Dion)	Bottom two
8	Gaute Ormåsen	"I'm Your Angel" (R. Kelly & Celine Dion)	Safe
9	Guro Dugstad	"I'm Every Woman" (Chaka Khan)	Safe
10	David Pedersen	"Kryptonite" (3 Doors Down)	Safe

==== Live Show 2 (28 March 2003) ====
Theme: Norwegian Songs

Order	Artist	Song (original artists)	Result
N/A	Jeanette Vik	N/A	Disqualified
1	David Pedersen	"Drømmedame" (Trang Fødsel)	Safe
2	Linn S. Andersen	"Alarmen gar" (Jan Eggum)	Bottom three
3	Gaute Ormåsen	"Jørgen Hattemaker" (Alf Prøysen)	Safe
4	Guro Dugstad	"Slaver av solen" (Seigmen)	Eliminated
5	Espen Grjotheim	"En natt forbi" (Jan Eggum)	Bottom two
6	Kurt Nilsen	"Skyfri himmel" (Bjørn Eidsvåg)	Safe
7	Rebecca Ludvigsen	"Mysteriet deg" (Bjørn Eidsvåg)	Safe
8	Orji Okoroafor	"Det vakreste som fins" (Jahn Teigen)	Safe
9	Tone Anette E. Elde	"Sommerfuggel i vinterland" (Halvdan Sivertsen)	Safe

==== Live Show 3 (4 April 2003) ====
Theme: 1980s

Order	Artist	Song (original artists)	Result
1	Gaute Ormåsen	"Take On Me" (A-ha)	Safe
2	Rebecca Ludvigsen	"Down on the Street" (Shakatak)	Bottom two
3	Orji Okoroafor	"If You Don't Know Me by Now" (Simply Red)	Eliminated
4	Linn S. Andersen	"He's Like the Wind" (Patrick Swayze)	Bottom three
5	Kurt Nilsen	"Hunting High and Low" (A-ha)	Safe
6	David Pedersen	"Heaven" (Bryan Adams)	Safe
7	Tone Anette E. Elde	"Hello" (Lionel Richie)	Safe
8	Espen Grjotheim	"Notorious" (Duran Duran)	Safe

==== Live Show 4 (11 April 2003) ====
Theme: Elton John

Order	Artist	Song	Result
1	Espen Grjotheim	"Your Song"	Safe
2	Linn S. Andersen	"Goodbye Yellow Brick Road"	Eliminated
3	Kurt Nilsen	"Candle in the Wind"	Safe
4	Rebecca Ludvigsen	"Sorry Seems to Be the Hardest Word"	Bottom three
5	David Pedersen	"Don't Let the Sun Go Down on Me"	Safe
6	Tone Anette E. Elde	"Sacrifice"	Bottom two
7	Gaute Ormåsen	"Something About the Way You Look Tonight"	Safe

==== Live Show 5 (25 April 2003) ====
Theme: Disco

Order	Artist	Song (original artists)	Result
1	David Pedersen	"Play That Funky Music" (Wild Cherry)	Safe
2	Rebecca Ludvigsen	"We Are Family" (Sister Sledge)	Bottom three
3	Espen Grjotheim	"Relight My Fire" (Dan Hartman)	Bottom two
4	Gaute Ormåsen	"Blame It on the Boogie" (The Jacksons)	Safe
5	Tone Anette E. Elde	"Upside Down" (Diana Ross)	Eliminated
6	Kurt Nilsen	"You're the First, the Last, My Everything" (Barry White)	Safe

==== Live Show 6 (2 May 2003) ====
Theme: Big Band

Order	Artist	Song (original artists)	Result
1	Espen Grjotheim	"Have You Met Miss Jones?" (Robbie Williams)	Eliminated
2	Gaute Ormåsen	"My Way" (Frank Sinatra)	Safe
3	Kurt Nilsen	"Fly Me to the Moon" (Frank Sinatra)	Safe
4	Rebecca Ludvigsen	"This Can't Be Love" (Natalie Cole)	Safe
5	David Pedersen	"Ain't That a Kick in the Head?" (Dean Martin)	Bottom two

==== Live Show 7 (9 May 2003) ====
Theme: Top 20 Hits

Order	Artist	First song (original artists)	Second song	Result
1	Kurt Nilsen	"Beautiful Day" (U2)	"Perfect Day" (Lou Reed)	Safe
2	Rebecca Ludvigsen	"Don't Speak" (No Doubt)	"Unforgivable Sinner" (Lene Marlin)	Eliminated
3	Gaute Ormåsen	"Believe" (Cher)	"Love Is All Around" (Wet Wet Wet)	Safe
4	David Pedersen	"Lemon Tree" (Fools Garden)	"Velvet" (Savoy)	Bottom two

==== Live Show 8: Semi-final (16 May 2003) ====
Theme: Judge's Choice

Order	Artist	First song (original artists)	Second song	Result
1	David Pedersen	"Wherever You Will Go" (The Calling)	"Dancing in the Moonlight" (Toploader)	Eliminated
2	Kurt Nilsen	"One" (U2)	"Livin' la Vida Loca" (Ricky Martin)	Safe
3	Gaute Ormåsen	"When Susannah Cries" (Espen Lind)	"Life Is a Rollercoaster" (Ronan Keating)	Safe

==== Live final (23 May 2003) ====
Order	Artist	First song	Second song	Third song	Result
1	Kurt Nilsen	"Wedding's Off"	"The Day After Tomorrow"	"She's So High"	Winner
2	Gaute Ormåsen	"Longest Goodbye"	"Something About the Way You Look Tonight"	"She's So High"	Runner-up
