= Jorun Stiansen =

Norwegian singer and artist

Jorun Stiansen (born 20 January 1984) is a Norwegian pop singer and artist. She won the Idol version of Pop Idol in 2005.

She was born in Colombia and grew up with adoptive parents in Vennesla Municipality. She is the only winner of this version to have been born outside Norway, and as of 2007 (season 5), the first (of two, Jenny Langlo won as the second female in 2011) female to have won.

Jorun Stiansen is one of only seven contestants in Norwegian Idol history who succeeded in staying out of the “bottom three/two” places in the weekly votes, along with Kurt Nilsen (season 1), Gaute Ormåsen (season 1), Susanne Nordbøe (season 2), Alejandro Fuentes (season 3), Tone Damli Aaberge (season 3) and Jonas Thomassen (season 4). Of these, only Nilsen and Stiansen went on to win the competition.

== Idol Performances ==
Audition: "Saving All My Love For You" by Whitney Houston
Top 50: "Run To You" by Whitney Houston
Top 12: "If I Ain't Got You" by Alicia Keys
Top 11: "Scared" by Venke Knutson
Top 10: "Work It Out" by Beyoncé Knowles
Top 9: "Angel" by Sarah McLachlan
Top 8: "What's Love Got To Do With It" by Tina Turner
Top 7: "Nine To Five" by Dolly Parton
Top 6: "We Can Work It Out" by The Beatles
Top 5: "Smile" by Westlife
Top 4: "The Greatest Love Of All" by Whitney Houston
Top 4: "Could I have This Kiss Forever (duet with Alejandro Fuentes) by Whitney Houston and Enrique Iglesias
Top 3: "Get This Party Started" by Pink
Top 3: "Too Lost In You" by Sugababes
Finale: "What's Love Got To Do With It" by Tina Turner
Finale: "If I Ain't Got You" by Alicia Keys
Finale: "This Is The Night" (winnersingle) aka "The Last Goodbye" by Lara Fabian

== Discography ==
Albums

- Idol 2005 (April 2005)
- Unstable (August 2005)
- Sticky Hands (2008) -unreleased-

Singles

- This Is The Night (May 2005)
- Unstable (feat. Paperboys) (2005)
- Sticky Hands (2007)
- Batman (2008)

Preceded by Kjartan Salvesen	Idol (Norway); Winner; Season 3 (2005)	Succeeded by Aleksander Denstad With
