= Idol (Norwegian TV series) season 2 =

Idol
- Season 2
- Hosted by: Solveig Kloppen; Ingrid Gjessing
- Judges: Jan Fredrik Karlsen; Anneli Drecker; Douglas Carr; Thomas Strzelecki
- Winner: Kjartan Salvesen
- Runner-up: Margaret Berger
- Finals venue: Chateau Neuf

Release
- Original network: TV 2
- Original release: January 2004 – May 14, 2004

Season chronology
- ← Previous; Season 1 Next → Season 3

Idol: Jakten på en superstjerne 2004 was the second season of Idol Norway based on the British singing competition Pop Idol. It premiered one year after the first season and was aired in the first half of 2004.

Unlike last year's winner Kurt Nilsen, his successor Kjartan Salvesen was not able to build up an international career. Other alumni of this season were more successful, most notably runner-up Margaret Berger, who established a career as an electronic dance artist and went on to become the music director of NRK P3 in 2008. Berger would also represent Norway at the Eurovision Song Contest 2013, placing fourth. Another contestant was Maria Haukaas Storeng who, to the surprise of some, was voted off sixth but went on to represent Norway in the Eurovision Song Contest in 2008 achieving fifth place.

== Finals ==
=== Finalists ===
(ages stated at time of contest)

Contestant	Age	Hometown	Voted Off	Liveshow Theme
Kjartan Salvesen	27	Sandnes	Winner	Grand Finale
Margaret Berger	18	Hitra	May 14, 2004	Grand Finale
Susanne Nordbøe	17	Sandnes	May 7, 2004	Judge's choice
Sandra Lyng Haugen	16	Mosjøen	Apr 30, 2004	Movie Songs
Håkon Njøten	18	Knarvik	Apr 23, 2004	Big Band
Maria Haukaas Storeng	24	Senja	Apr 16, 2004	Top 20 Hits
Trung Toan Tong	17	Moss	Apr 02, 2004	Birth Year
Maren Flotve Birkeland	18	Skudeneshavn	Mar 26, 2004	Disco Fever
Øystein Grønnevik	25	Rennesøy	Mar 19, 2004	Norwegian Songs
Ahn Vu	17	Sandnes	Mar 12, 2004	Contestant's choice
Roald Haar	24	Vigrestad	Mar 12, 2004	Contestant's choice

== Elimination Chart ==
Legend
Did Not Perform	Female	Male	Top 40	Wild Card	Top 11	Winner

Safe	Bottom 3	Bottom 2	Eliminated

Stage:		Semi				Wild; Card	Jury; Joker	Finals								
Week:		02/18	02/20	02/25	02/27	03/05	Jury; Joker	03/12	03/19	03/26	04/02	04/16	04/23	04/30	05/07	05/14
Place	Contestant	Result														
1	Kjartan Salvesen	22%											Btm 3			Winner
2	Margaret Berger				Elim	32%			Btm 3	Btm 3	Btm 3		Btm 2			Runner-Up
3	Susanne Nordbøe	18%				31%									Elim	
4	Sandra Lyng Haugen			32%						Btm 2	Btm 2	Btm 2		Elim		
5	Håkon Njøten	7%					Saved					Btm 3	Elim			
6	Maria Haukaas Storeng	34%										Elim				
7	Trung Toan Tong		32%						Btm 2		Elim					
8	Maren Flotve Birkeland			21%				Btm 3		Elim						
9	Øystein Grønnevik				18%				Elim							
10-11	Ahn Vu				32%			Elim								
10-11	Roald Haarr		12%					Elim								
Jury; Joker	Lasse Uppmann			8%			Elim									
Jury; Joker	Magnus Ullnæss			13%			Elim									
Wild; Card	Amalie Olsen		10%			Elim										
Wild; Card	Julie Tverrå Johnsen				7%	Elim										
Wild; Card	Karoline Garfjell					Elim										
Wild; Card	Olianne Wik Lauritsen					Elim										
Wild; Card	Stine Terese Julseth		10%			Elim										
Wild; Card	Tini Flaat				Elim	Elim										
Semi- Final 4	Gina Kristina Aspen				12%											
Semi- Final 4	Peter Lexander				9%											
Semi- Final 4	Anne M. Lemicka				Elim											
Semi- Final 4	Enrique Dragseth Salomon				Elim											
Semi- Final 4	Knut Erik Lunden				Elim											
Semi- Final 3	Øyvind Omnes			7%												
Semi- Final 3	Arma Husanovic			Elim												
Semi- Final 3	Bjørn Martin Simensen			Elim												
Semi- Final 3	Hanna Camilla Kullander			Elim												
Semi- Final 3	Mari Kjølstad			Elim												
Semi- Final 3	Wenche Munkejord			Elim												
Semi- Final 2	Ståle Mikal Skaaden		11%													
Semi- Final 2	Adele Erichsen		Elim													
Semi- Final 2	Glenn Magne Elvik		Elim													
Semi- Final 2	Siri Saupstad		Elim													
Semi- Final 2	Stina Stenerud		Elim													
Semi- Final 2	Tine Gadja Andersen		Elim													
Semi- Final 1	Nanna S. Christensen	5%														
Semi- Final 1	Daniel Smette Valderhaug	Elim														
Semi- Final 1	Linda Therese Thorstensen	Elim														
Semi- Final 1	Ørjan Nilsson	Elim														
Semi- Final 1	Stina Eia	Elim														
Semi- Final 1	Vanja Friksen	Elim														

=== Live show details ===
==== Heat 1 (18 February 2004) ====
Order	Artist	Song (original artists)	Result
1	Nanna Christensen	"I Just Want to Make Love to You" (Etta James)	Eliminated
2	Håkon Njøten	"Everybody Hurts" (R.E.M.)	Eliminated
3	Stina Eia	"I'll Stand by You" (The Pretenders)	Eliminated
4	Daniel Smette Valderhaug	"I Believe I Can Fly" (R. Kelly)	Eliminated
5	Vanja Friksen	"Time" (Vanja Friksen)	Eliminated
6	Susanne Nordbøe	"Killing Me Softly" (The Fugees)	Eliminated
7	Ørjan Nilsson	"Glorious" (Andreas Johnson)	Eliminated
8	Linda Therese Thorstensen	"You're Still the One" (Shania Twain)	Eliminated
9	Kjartan Salvesen	"Unwell" (Matchbox Twenty)	Advanced
10	Maria Haukaas Storeng	"I Have Nothing" (Whitney Houston)	Advanced

Notes

- Maria Haukass Storeng and Kjartan Salvesen advanced to the top 11 of the competition. The other 8 contestants were eliminated.
- Susanne Nordbøe returned for a second chance at the top 11 in the Wildcard Round.

==== Heat 2 (20 February 2004) ====
Order	Artist	Song (original artists)	Result
1	Siri Saupstad	"Think" (Aretha Franklin)	Eliminated
2	Glenn Magne Elvik	"This I Promise You" (NSYNC)	Eliminated
3	Tine Gadja Andersen	"Fångad av en stormvind" (Carola Häggkvist)	Eliminated
4	Roald Haarr	"You Raise Me Up" (Secret Garden)	Advanced
5	Stina Stenerud	"Piece of My Heart" (Janis Joplin)	Eliminated
6	Stine Terese Julseth	"The Trouble with Love Is" (Kelly Clarkson)	Eliminated
7	Ståle Mikal Skaaden	"I Wonder Why" (Curtis Stigers)	Eliminated
8	Adele Erichsen	"(You Make Me Feel Like) A Natural Woman" (Aretha Franklin)	Eliminated
9	Trung Toan Tong	"Back to Your Heart" (Backstreet Boys)	Advanced
10	Amalie Olsen	"Bohemian Rhapsody" (Queen)	Eliminated

Notes

- Trung Toan Tong and Roald Haarr advanced to the top 11 of the competition. The other 8 contestants were eliminated.
- Stine Terese Julseth and Amalie Olsen returned for a second chance at the top 11 in the Wildcard Round.

==== Heat 3 (25 February 2004) ====
Order	Artist	Song (original artists)	Result
1	Arma Husanovic	"Torn" (Natalie Imbruglia)	Eliminated
2	Bjørn Martin Simensen	"Faith" (George Michael)	Eliminated
3	Hanna Camilla Kullander	"Open Arms" (Journey)	Eliminated
4	Lasse Uppmann	"Against All Odds (Take a Look at Me Now)" (Phil Collins)	Eliminated
5	Mari Kjølstad	"Didn't We Almost Have It All" (Whitney Houston)	Eliminated
6	Wenche Munkejord	"Let It Rain" (Amanda Marshall)	Eliminated
7	Øyvind Omnes	"Fields of Gold" (Sting)	Eliminated
8	Sandra Lyng Haugen	"My Immortal" (Evanescence)	Advanced
9	Magnus Ullnæss	"Your Song" (Elton John)	Eliminated
10	Maren Flotve Birkeland	"When I Need You" (Leo Sayer)	Advanced

Notes

- Sandra Lyng Haugen and Maren Flotve Birkeland advanced to the top 11 of the competition. The other 8 contestants were eliminated.
- None of the contestants from this round made it into the Wildcard Round, making it the only group to not be represented at that stage.

==== Heat 4 (27 February 2004) ====
Order	Artist	Song (original artists)	Result
1	Julie Tverrå Johnsen	"Amneris' Letter" (Shania Twain)	Eliminated
2	Enrique Drageseth	"Walk On" (U2)	Eliminated
3	Anne Margrete Lemicka	"Last Tear of Pain" (Anne Margrete Lemicka)	Eliminated
4	Peter Lexander	"Öppna din dörr" (Tommy Nilsson)	Eliminated
5	Margaret Berger	"Were You Worth My Tears" (Margaret Berger)	Eliminated
6	Gina Kristina Aspen	"Help!" (The Beatles)	Eliminated
7	Knut Erik Lunden	"Unintended" (Muse)	Eliminated
8	Tini Flaat	"I Don't Want to See You Cry" (Silje Nergaard)	Eliminated
9	Øystein Grønnevik	"Hallelujah" (Leonard Cohen)	Advanced
10	Anh Vu	"Fallin'" (Alicia Keys)	Advanced

Notes

- Anh Vu and Øystein Grønnevik advanced to the top 11 of the competition. The other 8 contestants were eliminated.
- Julie Tverrå Johnsen, Margaret Berger and Tini Flaat returned for a second chance at the top 11 in the Wildcard Round.

==== Wildcard round (3 March 2004) ====
Order	Artist	Song (original artists)	Result
1	Olianne Wik Lauritsen	"Believe in You" (Amanda Marshall)	Eliminated
2	Stine Terese Julseth	"Missing You" (John Waite)	Eliminated
3	Tini Flaat	"You've Got a Friend" (Carole King)	Eliminated
4	Julie Tverrå Johnsen	"The Voice Within" (Christina Aguilera)	Eliminated
5	Susanne Nordbøe	"Family Portrait" (Pink)	Advanced
6	Amalie Olsen	"Beautiful" (Christina Aguilera)	Eliminated
7	Karoline Garfjell	"(They Long to Be) Close to You" (The Carpenters)	Eliminated
8	Margaret Berger	"Come Together" (The Beatles)	Advanced

Notes

- Susanne Nordbøe and Margaret Berger received the highest number of votes, and advanced to the top 11 of the competition.
- Håkon Njøten won the Jury Joker, and completed the top 11.

==== Live Show 1 (19 March 2004) ====
Theme: Your Idol

Order	Artist	Song (original artists)	Result
1	Maren Flotve Birkeland	"How Will I Know" (Whitney Houston)	Bottom three
2	Trung Toan Tong	"Hard to Say I'm Sorry" (Chicago)	Safe
3	Maria Haukaas Storeng	"I Want You Back" (The Jackson 5)	Safe
4	Håkon Njøten	"Englishman in New York" (Sting)	Safe
5	Anh Vu	"Hero" (Mariah Carey)	Eliminated
6	Øystein Grønnevik	"I Shall Be Released" (Bob Dylan)	Safe
7	Margaret Berger	"Forgiven" (Alanis Morissette)	Safe
8	Kjartan Salvesen	"Sexed Up" (Robbie Williams)	Safe
9	Susanne Nordbøe	"Don't Speak" (No Doubt)	Safe
10	Roald Haar	"Stay on These Roads" (A-ha)	Eliminated
11	Sandra Lyng Haugen	"Panic" (Venke Knutson)	Safe

==== Live Show 2 (26 March 2004) ====
Theme: Norwegian Songs

Order	Artist	Song (original artists)	Result
1	Sandra Lyng Haugen	"Mysteriet deg" (Bjørn Eidsvåg)	Safe
2	Kjartan Salvesen	"Bare i nått" (Mods)	Safe
3	Margaret Berger	"Splitter pine" (DumDum Boys)	Bottom three
4	Trung Toan Tong	"Ville fugla flyg" (D.D.E.)	Bottom two
5	Susanne Nordbøe	"Me to går alltid aleina" (Mods)	Safe
6	Maria Haukaas Storeng	"Har en drøm" (Jørn Hoel)	Safe
7	Håkon Njøten	"Hjemmefra" (Sigvart Dagsland)	Safe
8	Maren Flotve Birkeland	"Tir n'a Noir" (Vamp)	Safe
9	Øystein Grønnevik	"Gutta" (Jokke & Valentinerne)	Eliminated

==== Live Show 3 (2 April 2004) ====
Theme: Disco

Order	Artist	Song (original artists)	Result
1	Susanne Nordbøe	"It's Raining Men" (The Weather Girls)	Safe
2	Håkon Njøten	"You're the First, the Last, My Everything" (Barry White)	Safe
3	Maren Flotve Birkeland	"September" (Earth, Wind & Fire)	Eliminated
4	Sandra Lyng Haugen	"We Are Family" (Sister Sledge)	Bottom two
5	Trung Toan Tong	"Going Back to My Roots" (Odyssey)	Safe
6	Margaret Berger	"Don't Leave Me This Way" (Harold Melvin & the Blue Notes)	Bottom three
7	Kjartan Salvesen	"Blame It on the Boogie" (The Jacksons)	Safe
8	Maria Haukaas Storeng	"Hot Stuff" (Donna Summer)	Safe

==== Live Show 4 (9 April 2004) ====
Theme: Your Birth Year

Order	Artist	Song (original artists)	Result
1	Margaret Berger	"Walking on Sunshine" (Katrina and the Waves)	Bottom three
2	Kjartan Salvesen	"Sorry Seems to Be the Hardest Word" (Elton John)	Safe
3	Maria Haukaas Storeng	"I'm Every Woman" (Chaka Khan)	Safe
4	Trung Toan Tong	"Stand By Me" (Ben E. King)	Eliminated
5	Sandra Lyng Haugen	"(I Just) Died in Your Arms" (Cutting Crew)	Bottom two
6	Håkon Njøten	"Just a Gigolo" (David Lee Roth)	Safe
7	Susanne Nordbøe	"Papa Don't Preach" (Madonna)	Safe

==== Live Show 5 (16 April 2004) ====
Theme: Top 20 Hits

Order	Artist	Song (original artists)	Result
1	Maria Haukaas Storeng	"Shackles (Praise You)" (Mary Mary)	Eliminated
2	Håkon Njøten	"Girl in Oslo" (Bigbang)	Bottom three
3	Susanne Nordbøe	"Get the Party Started" (Pink)	Safe
4	Sandra Lyng Haugen	"Love Don't Cost a Thing" (Jennifer Lopez)	Bottom two
5	Kjartan Salvesen	"Stuck in a Moment You Can't Get Out Of" (U2)	Safe
6	Margaret Berger	"Murder on the Dancefloor" (Sophie Ellis-Bextor)	Safe

==== Live Show 6 (23 April 2004) ====
Theme: Big Band

Order	Artist	Song (original artists)	Result
1	Susanne Nordbøe	"Fly Me to the Moon" (Frank Sinatra)	Safe
2	Kjartan Salvesen	"The Lady Is a Tramp" (Frank Sinatra)	Bottom three
3	Margaret Berger	"It's Oh So Quiet" (Björk)	Bottom two
4	Sandra Lyng Haugen	"L-O-V-E" (Nat King Cole)	Safe
5	Håkon Njøten	"They Can't Take That Away from Me" (Frank Sinatra)	Eliminated

==== Live Show 7 (30 April 2004) ====
Theme: Film Hits

Order	Artist	First song (original artists)	Second song	Result
1	Sandra Lyng Haugen	"(Everything I Do) I Do It for You" (Bryan Adams)	"Can't Fight the Moonlight" (LeAnn Rimes)	Eliminated
2	Margaret Berger	"Queen of the Night" (Whitney Houston)	"Uninvited" (Alanis Morissette)	Safe
3	Susanne Nordbøe	"Independent Women" (Destiny's Child)	"Son of a Preacher Man" (Dusty Springfield)	Safe
4	Kjartan Salvesen	"Eye of the Tiger" (Survivor)	"I Don't Want to Miss a Thing" (Aerosmith)	Safe

==== Live Show 8: Semi-final (7 May 2004) ====
Theme: Judge's Choice

Order	Artist	First song (original artists)	Second song	Result
1	Susanne Nordbøe	"Under the Bridge" (Red Hot Chili Peppers)	"Crazy" (Seal)	Eliminated
2	Kjartan Salvesen	"Angels" (Robbie Williams)	"Two Princes" (Spin Doctors)	Safe
3	Margaret Berger	"Stop!" (Sam Brown)	"It's My Life" (No Doubt)	Safe

==== Live final (14 May 2004) ====
Order	Artist	First song	Second song	Third song	Result
1	Kjartan Salvesen	"Unwell"	"Sorry Seems to Be the Hardest Word"	"Standing Tall"	Winner
2	Margaret Berger	"Come Together"	"Forgiven"	"Standing Tall"	Runner-up
