= This Is Pop Music =

Studio album by Espen Lind
- Released: 2000
- Label: Universal

This Is Pop Music is the third album by the Norwegian singer/songwriter Espen Lind and the second released under his name. Three singles were released from the album: "Black Sunday", "Life Is Good", and "Where the Lost Ones Go", the latter a duet with Sissel Kyrkjebø. "Where the Lost Ones Go" had previously been released on Sissel's album, All Good Things.

The album was initially considered a commercial disappointment, not selling as well as the previous album, Red, did. It peaked at number 3 and spent nine weeks on the Norwegian music chart.

== Singles ==
- "Life Is Good" was released as a single in Germany, peaking at the bottom of the singles chart.
- "Where the Lost Ones Go" was released in the Netherlands with moderate success.

== Track listing ==
1. "Joni Mitchell on the Radio"
2. "Where the Lost Ones Go"
3. "Black Sunday"
4. "Coming Home"
5. "Everything's Falling Apart"
6. "Everybody Says"
7. "The Dolphin Club"
8. "I Want You"
9. "This Is the Time! This Is the Place!"
10. "Life Is Good"
11. "Pop From Hell"

In the Norwegian version, "Where the Lost Ones Go" was removed from the album.
