= I (Kurt Nilsen album) =

Studio album by Kurt Nilsen
- Released: 8 September 2003
- Studios: Hitsville Studios, Norway
- Genre: Pop rock
- Length: 43:48
- Label: BMG Norway
- Producer: Ole Evenrude

Kurt Nilsen chronology
I (2003)	A Part of Me (2004)

I (also: i) is the debut album of Norwegian singer-songwriter Kurt Nilsen. It was released on 8 September 2003 through BMG Norway. The album topped the charts in Norway, also reaching the top 10 in Belgium, and the top 20 in Germany.

== Track listing ==
1. "Here She Comes" (Kurt Nilsen, Dag Ove Nilsen, Geir Johannessen)
2. "All You Have to Offer" (Nilsen, Nilsen)
3. "Breathe You In" (Christian Nystrøm, Nilsen, Nilsen)
4. "Last Day of Summer" (Nilsen, Nilsen)
5. "Lost in Despair" (Nilsen, Nilsen)
6. "Games We Play" (Andreas Johnson)
7. "Sue Me" (Nilsen, Nilsen, Johannessen)
8. "Wedding's Off" (Nilsen, Nilsen)
9. "Ordinary World" (Simon Le Bon, John Taylor, Warren Cuccurullo, Nick Rhodes)
10. "She's So High" (Tal Bachman)
11. "Smell the Roses" (Nilsen, Nilsen)
12. "I" (Nilsen, Nilsen)

== Charts ==
Chart (2003–04)	Peak position
Austrian Albums (Ö3 Austria)	58
Belgian Albums (Ultratop Flanders)	8
Dutch Albums (Album Top 100)	51
German Albums (Offizielle Top 100)	19
Norwegian Albums (VG-lista)	1
Swiss Albums (Schweizer Hitparade)	69
