= All Good Things (album) =

Studio album by Sissel Kyrkjebø
- Released: 2000
- Genres: Pop, Folk
- Length: 50:00
- Label: Mercury

Sissel Kyrkjebø chronology
| The Best of Sissel (2000) | All Good Things (2000) | In Symphony (2001) |

All Good Things is the sixth studio album by Norwegian singer Sissel Kyrkjebø. It was released in Norway in the year 2000, 2001 in many other countries, and 2002 in the United Kingdom. A re-recording of many of the album's songs as well as some new ones is included in her self-titled 2002 USA release, Sissel. The Japanese release contains a bonus track: He's a Lot.

== Track listing ==
=== Scandinavia version ===
1. "Weightless"
2. "Carrier of a Secret"
3. "Should It Matter"
4. "All Good Things"
5. "Lær meg å kjenne"
6. "Keep Falling Down"
7. "Better Off Alone"
8. "Sarah's Song"
9. "One Day"
10. "Where The Lost Ones Go" (duet with Espen Lind)
11. "We Both Know"

=== International version ===
1. "Weightless"
2. "Carrier Of A Secret"
3. "Should It Matter"
4. "All Good Things"
5. "Lær meg å kjenne"
6. "Keep Falling Down"
7. "Better Off Alone"
8. "Sarah's Song"
9. "One Day"
10. "Where The Lost Ones Go" (duet with Espen Lind)
11. "We Both Know"

=== Japan version ===
1. "Weightless"
2. "Carrier Of A Secret"
3. "Should It Matter"
4. "All Good Things"
5. "Lær meg å kjenne"
6. "Keep Falling Down"
7. "Better Off Alone"
8. "Sarah's Song"
9. "One Day"
10. "Where The Lost Ones Go" (duet with Espen Lind)
11. "We Both Know"
12. "He's a Lot"
