= Carrier of a Secret =

"Carrier Of A Secret"

Single by Sissel

from the album All Good Things
- Released: 2002
- Genre: Pop
- Label: Universal
- Songwriter(s): David Forman; Jørn Dahl

Sissel singles chronology
"Where the Lost Ones Go" (2001)	"Carrier Of A Secret" (2002)	"Gå inte förbi" (2003)

"Carrier Of A Secret" is a single from the Norwegian singer Sissel's All Good Things album, released in 2002. It is a pop-ballad written by David Forman and Jørn Dahl, who also produced the song. This song exists in three different versions: the album version on All Good Things, the cd-single version and the re-recorded version on Sissel.

== Track listing ==
1. "Carrier Of A Secret"
2. "Molde Canticle"
3. "Where the Lost Ones Go"
