= Kjartan Salvesen =

Norwegian singer (born 1976)

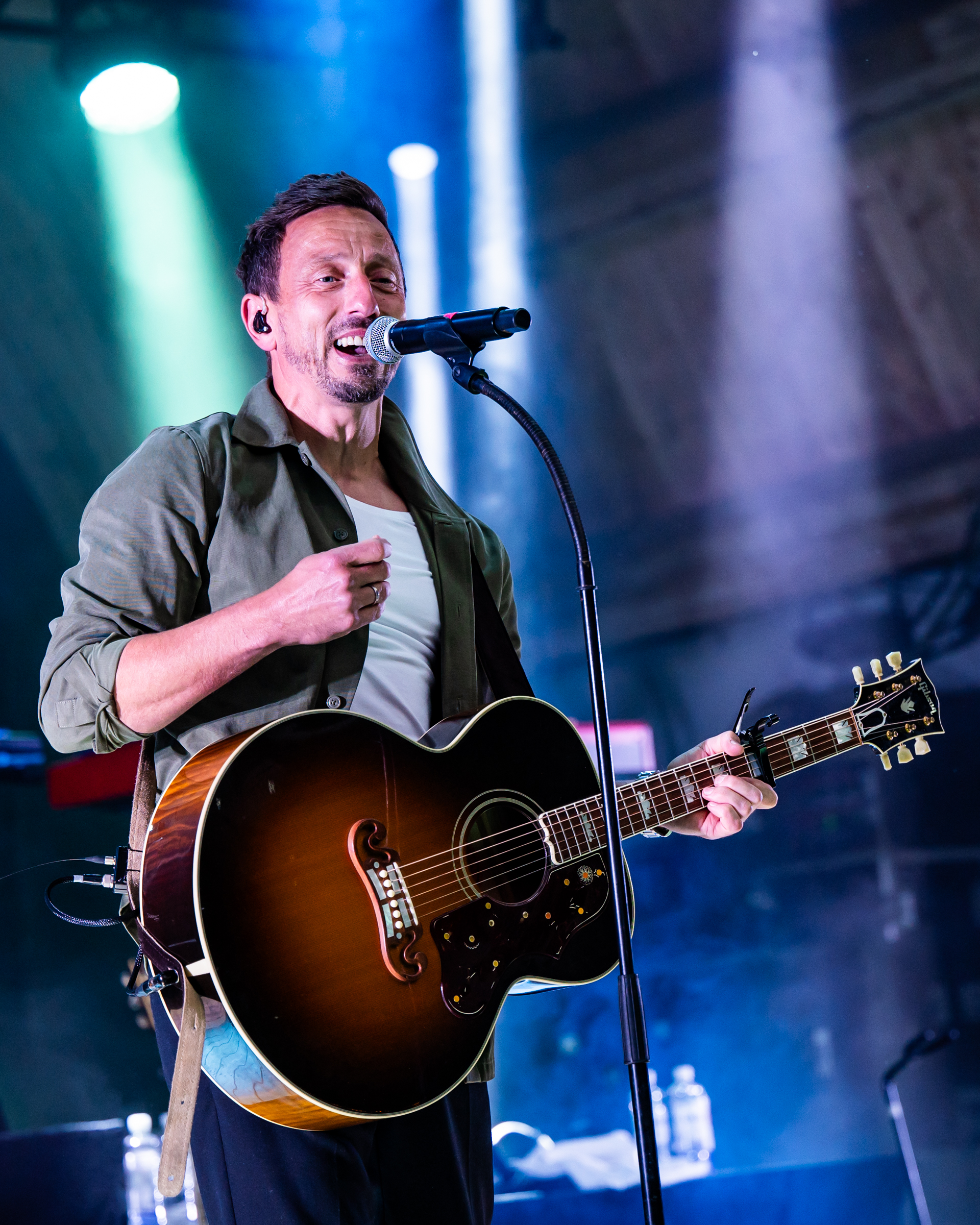
- Kjartan Salvesen on stage 2024; Photo: Birgit Fostervold
- Born: 17 October 1976 (age 49); Sandnes, Norway

Kjartan Salvesen (born 17 October 1976) is a Norwegian singer. He was born in Sandnes. In 2004, he won the second season of Norwegian version of Idol by 840.000 votes, the highest number for any participant on the show. His single "Standing Tall" sold 5 times platinum, making it the most sold single of all time in Norway. He later released a self-titled album that sold platinum. He is also known to be a big fan of Viking FK and appeared in a performance on the opening of Viking Stadion.

He has also played in the highest Norwegian league in floorball.

== Idol Performances ==
Audition: "Unwell" by matchbox twenty
Top 50: "Unwell" by matchbox twenty
Top 11: "Sexed Up" by Robbie Williams
Top 9: "Bare I Nått"
Top 8: "Blame It On The Boogie" by Jackson 5
Top 7: "Sorry Seems To Be The Hardest Word" by Elton John
Top 6: "Stuck in a Moment You Can't Get Out Of" by U2
Top 5: "The Lady Is A Tramp"
Top 4: "Eye of the Tiger" by Survivor
Top 4: "I Don't Want to Miss a Thing" by Aerosmith
Top 3: "Angels" by Robbie Williams
Top 3: "Two Princes" by Spin Doctors
Finale: "Unwell" by matchbox twenty
Finale: "Sorry Seems To Be The Hardest Word" by Elton John
Finale: "Standing Tall"

== Discography ==
- KS EP (2003)
- Idol 2004: De Elleve Finalistene (2004)
- Kjartan Salvesen (2004)
- Then Silence (2007)

| Preceded by Kurt Nilsen | Idol (Norway) winner Season 2 (2004) | Succeeded by Jorun Stiansen |
