= Where the Lost Ones Go =

2001 single by Sissel Kyrkjebø

Single by Sissel and Espen Lind

from the album All Good Things
- Released: 2001
- Genre: Pop rock
- Label: Universal
- Songwriters: Espen Lind; Magnus Rostadmo

Sissel and Espen Lind singles chronology
"Black Sunday" (2000)	"Where the Lost Ones Go" (2001)	"Life Is Good" (2002)

Sissel Kyrkjebø singles chronology
"Summer Snow" (2000)	"Where the Lost Ones Go" (2001)	"Carrier of a Secret" (2002)

"Where the Lost Ones Go" is a single from Norwegian singer Sissel's All Good Things album, released in 2001. It is a duet with Espen Lind, written by Lind and Magnus Rostadmo. It also appeared on Espen Lind's This Is Pop Music album.

== Track listing ==
1. "Where the Lost Ones Go"
2. "One Day"
3. "He's a Lot"
4. "Where the Lost Ones Go" (Instrumental)

== Chart positions ==
The single spent five weeks on the Netherlands charts.

Chart (2001)	Peak Position
Norway	26
Netherlands	90

== Sarah Brightman version ==
"I Will Be with You (Where the Lost Ones Go)"

Single by Sarah Brightman featuring Chris Thompson

from the album Symphony
- Released: July 16, 2007
- Studio: Abbey Road Studios (London, England); Nemo Studios (Hamburg, Germany); Proloton Studios (Hamburg, Germany); H.O.M.E.-Studios (Hamburg, Germany)
- Genre: Pop rock
- Length: 4:34
- Label: Angel Records
- Songwriters: Espen Lind; Magnus Rostandmo; Amund Bjorklund
- Producer: Frank Peterson

Sarah Brightman featuring Chris Thompson singles chronology
"Snow on the Sahara" (2004)	"I Will Be with You (Where the Lost Ones Go)" (2007)	"Running" (2007)

Sarah Brightman & Chris Thompson singles chronology
"How Can Heaven Love Me" (1995)	"I Will Be with You" (2007)

"I Will Be with You (Where the Lost Ones Go)" is a duet by Sarah Brightman and Chris Thompson; Written by Espen Lind, Magnus Rostadmo and Amund Bjorklund. The single was released on July 16, 2007 (See 2007 in music). The song was used as the official theme song for the Japanese version of the tenth Pokémon film The Rise of Darkrai. It was also used in her Symphony concert DVD.

The album version of the song, featuring Paul Stanley of Kiss in place of Thompson, can be found on Symphony. "I Will Be with You (Where the Lost Ones Go)" is the second duet between Brightman and Thompson; the first being "How Can Heaven Love Me" which featured on Brightman's album Fly.

The Polish edition of the album features the song as a duet with Andrzej Lampert; again the song is the same, but with new male vocal. It was the first time that Brightman agreed to record a bonus track with a local artist.

There is also a Russian version recorded with Sergey Penkin.

=== Track listing ===
1. "I Will Be with You (Where the Lost Ones Go)" (Movie version) - 4:34
2. "I Will Be with You (Where the Lost Ones Go)" (Movie version) (Instrumental) - 4:34

=== Charts ===
Chart (2007)	Peak position
Japan (Oricon)	98

== Other covers ==
Garðar Thór Cortes covered the song on the UK version of his album, Cortes, featuring Katherine Jenkins.
