= Tal Bachman (album) =

Studio album by Tal Bachman
- Released: April 13, 1999
- Recorded: 1998–99
- Studios: Plantation Mixing & Recording (Maui, Hawaii); Shed (Vancouver, British Columbia)
- Genres: Pop rock; power pop; alternative rock
- Length: 46:29
- Label: Columbia
- Producers: Tal Bachman; Bob Rock

Tal Bachman chronology
Tal Bachman (1999)	Staring Down the Sun (2004)

Singles from Tal Bachman
- 1. "She's So High" Released: February 13, 1999; 2. "If You Sleep" Released: February 14, 2000

Tal Bachman is the debut album by Canadian singer-songwriter Tal Bachman. It contains the 1999 hit single "She's So High", which peaked at number one on the US Adult Top 40 chart and No. 14 on the Billboard Hot 100.

== Critical reception ==
Professional ratings
Review scores
Source	Rating
AllMusic	3/5 stars

Stephen Thomas Erlewine of AllMusic wrote, "Living up to the legend of Randy Bachman might not be as overwhelming as living up to the legacy of John Lennon, but Tal Bachman does something neither Julian nor Sean Lennon did -- he made a debut album that has nothing to do whatsoever with his father's music."

== Track listing ==
All tracks are written by Tal Bachman, except where noted

Tal Bachman – Standard edition
No.	Title	Writer(s)	Length
1.	"Darker Side of Blue"	Tal Bachman; Dominic Miller; Sheppard Solomon	3:22
2.	"She's So High"		3:44
3.	"If You Sleep"		4:42
4.	"(You Love) Like Nobody Loves Me"	Bachman; Gregg Sutton; Trey Bruce	3:55
5.	"Strong Enough"		4:16
6.	"You Don't Know What It's Like"		3:07
7.	"I Wonder"		4:38
8.	"Beside You"		3:14
9.	"Romanticide"		3:23
10.	"Looks Like Rain"		3:29
11.	"You're My Everything"		3:16
12.	"I Am Free"		5:22

Tal Bachman – Japanese edition bonus track
No.	Title	Length
13.	"When the Sun Goes Down"

== Personnel ==
Personnel adapted from liner notes

- Tal Bachman – lead and background vocals, guitars (lead, rhythm and lap steel), piano

Additional musicians

- Buck Johnson – Wurlitzer, B3, Moog, background vocals
- Lance Porter – drums
- Chris Wyse – bass

Production

- Bob Rock – mixing, producer
- Tal Bachman – mixing, producer, orchestral arrangements
- Brian Joseph Dobbs – engineer
- Mike Gillies – additional engineering
- George Marino – mastering
- Paul Buckmaster – conductor, orchestral arrangements

== Charts ==
Weekly chart performance for Tal Bachman
Chart (1999)	Peak position
US Billboard 200	124
