= When Susannah Cries =

Single by Espen Lind

from the album Red
- Released: 1997
- Genre: Ballad; pop
- Length: 3:39
- Label: Universal Records
- Songwriter: Espen Lind
- Producer: Espen Lind

Espen Lind singles chronology
"Baby You're So Cool" (1997)	"When Susannah Cries" (1997)	"Lucky for You" (1997)

Music video
- "When Susannah Cries" on YouTube

"When Susannah Cries" is a 1997 song by Norwegian singer Espen Lind. It was released as the second single from his second album, Red (1997), first under the moniker Sway, but later it was re-released under his own name. A slow, piano-driven ballad, it features strings from the Oslo Philharmonic and was a major hit in several European and Latin-American countries, including Norway, where it was number-one for six weeks. It peaked within the top 10 in at least eleven countries, like Austria, Belgium, Germany, the Netherlands and Switzerland. On the Eurochart Hot 100, the single reached number 18 in April 1998. Same year, Lind received the Norwegian Grammy Award, Spellemannprisen for the Song of the Year with "When Susannah Cries".

Lind has told in interviews that he almost gave the song away, but his record company, Universal, convinced him to keep it. He had sent several songs to them, and the last one was "When Susannah Cries". Lind felt that it was a bit sticky and lame, but Universal said that it was the only song they liked. It went on to become Linds commercial breakthrough and the most played song on Norwegian radio in 1997.

"When Susannah Cries" was performed by Pete Seppälä in the semifinals of the Finnish reality-television singing competition Idols in 2005 and by participant Tim David Weller in the tenth season of the German reality talent show Deutschland sucht den Superstar in 2013.

== Critical reception ==
Geir Rakvaag from Arbeiderbladet deemed it one of the "most tender ballads" of the album Red. Håkon Moslet from Dagbladet described it as "pompous handkerchiefpop of the best brand". Robert St. Dyrnes from Finnmark Dagblad called it a "sugarsweet ballad". A reviewer from Göteborgs-Tidningen declared it as a "tasty piano ballad". Listen to Norway wrote that "When Susannah Cries" "comprises catchy refrains, suggestive bridges, a guitar solo, a dramatic crescendo (with heavenly strings from the Oslo Philharmonic and a closing finale on the piano". Gerald Martinez from New Sunday Times said it is a "romantic weepy tune that should go down well with fans of sentimental pop ballads." He also noted that Lind "has a voice remarkably similar to Rick Price — powerful, plaintive and with the occasional surges into falsetto." Rune Slyngstad from Nordlandsposten called it a "kind pop-ballad with a huge exclamation mark behind the name George Michael." Geir Seljeseth from Nordlys described it as "powerful".

== Music video ==
A music video was produced to promote the single, directed by Yann Gamblin. It features American actress and model Angelica Bridges, known from the American action drama series Baywatch and was added on high rotation on MTV, TMF, VIVA and ZTV. The video is mostly in black and white, but a few scenes also appears in color. It begins with Lind singing, while a woman, played by Bridges, is holding him. Some scenes show them walking together through a forest while holding hands. Others show a naked Bridges sitting on rocks in the shoreline while Lind sings around her. He looks at her as she sits and covers her breasts with her hands. Sometimes she holds around him, other times he holds around her. As the video ends, the woman holds tightly around Lind as he sings the final sentences.

== Track listing ==
- CD single, Europe (1997)
1. "When Susannah Cries" (Single Version) – 3:39
2. "When Susannah Cries" (Acoustic Version) – 3:39
- CD maxi, Europe (1997)
1. "When Susannah Cries" (Single Version) – 3:39
2. "When Susannah Cries" (Instrumental Version) – 3:39
3. "When Susannah Cries" (Acoustic Version) – 3:39
4. Excerpts from: "Lucky for You", "Messing with Me", "Missing Her Then"
- CD maxi, UK (1997)
1. "When Susannah Cries" (Single Version) – 3:38
2. "When Susannah Cries" (Instrumental Version) – 3:39
3. "When Susannah Cries" (Acoustic Version) – 3:39
4. "Messing with Me" – 4:17

== Charts ==
=== Weekly charts ===
Weekly chart performance for "When Susannah Cries"
Chart (1997–1998)	Peak position
Austria (Ö3 Austria Top 40)	10
Belgium (Ultratop 50 Flanders)	2
Belgium (Ultratop 50 Wallonia)	21
Europe (Eurochart Hot 100)	18
France (SNEP)	41
Germany (GfK)	9
Italy Airplay (Music & Media)	10
Netherlands (Dutch Top 40)	10
Netherlands (Single Top 100)	10
Norway (Ti i skuddet)	1
Norway (VG-lista)	1
Spain (AFYVE)	8
Sweden (Sverigetopplistan)	34
Switzerland (Schweizer Hitparade)	5

=== Year-end charts ===
1997 year-end chart performance for "When Susannah Cries"
Chart (1997)	Position
Norway (VG-lista)	12

1998 year-end chart performance for "When Susannah Cries"
Chart (1998)	Position
Belgium (Ultratop 50 Flanders)	29
Europe (Eurochart Hot 100)	69
Europe Border Breakers (Music & Media)	14
Germany (Media Control)	49
Netherlands (Dutch Top 40)	74
Netherlands (Single Top 100)	76
Switzerland (Schweizer Hitparade)	34
