= Askil Holm =

Norwegian singer and musician

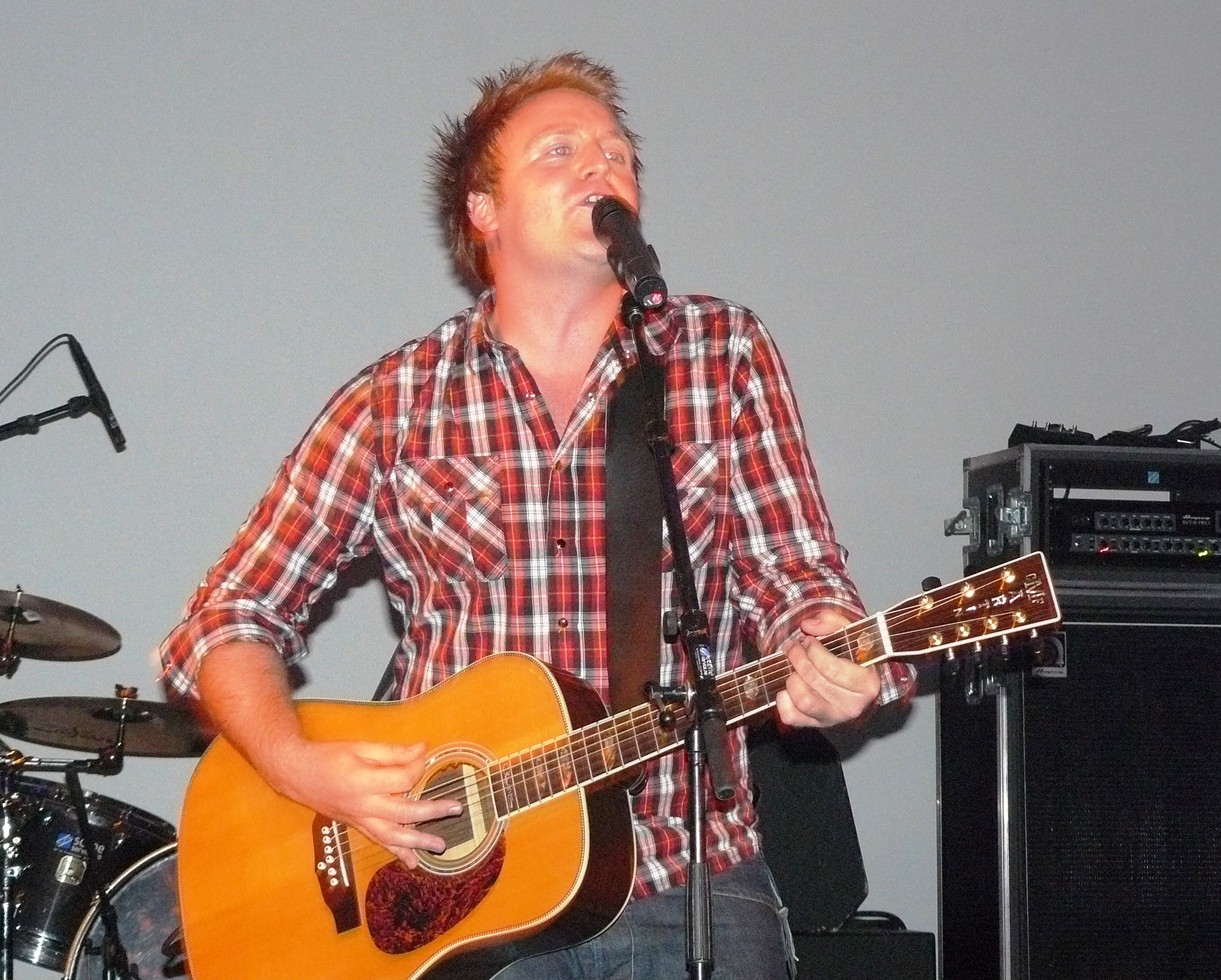
Askil Holm.

Askil Holm (born 1 June 1980) is a Norwegian singer and musician from Namsos.

In 2006, he was a part of the big success when he played together with Espen Lind, Alejandro Fuentes and Kurt Nilsen. Their record Hallelujah Live sold 260,000 copies in Norway.

Holm has also seen success by performing at the famous "Jam Sessions" in Kristiansand, Norway.

== Discography ==
=== Albums ===
Year	Album	Peak position	Certifications	Notes
Year	Album	NOR	Certifications	Notes
2003	Daydream Receiver	20		
2007	Harmony Hotel	2		
2012	Ei ny tid	5		

Collective albums

Year	Album	Peak position	Certifications	Notes
Year	Album	NOR	Certifications	Notes
2006	Hallelujah - Live (Kurt Nilsen, Espen Lind, Askil Holm & Alejandro Fuentes)	1		
2009	Hallelujah - Live (Volume 2) (Kurt Nilsen, Espen Lind, Askil Holm & Alejandro Fuentes)	1		

=== Singles and EPs ===
Year	Single	Peak position	Certifications	Album
Year	Single	NOR	Certifications	Album
2006	Seven Days In The Sun (EP)	20		

Collective singles

Year	Single	Peak position	Certifications	Album
Year	Single	NOR	Certifications	Album
2006	"Hallelujah (Kurt Nilsen, Espen Lind, Askil Holm & Alejandro Fuentes)	1		Hallelujah - Live
2006	"Boys of Summer" (Kurt Nilsen, Espen Lind, Askil Holm & Alejandro Fuentes)	12		Hallelujah - Live
2009	"With or Without You" (Kurt Nilsen, Espen Lind, Askil Holm & Alejandro Fuentes)	1		Hallelujah - Live (Volume 2)
