= David Pedersen =

Norwegian singer

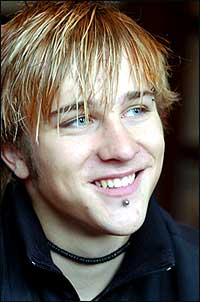
David Pedersen.

David Pedersen (born 15 May 1986 in Andenes, Vesterålen) is a Norwegian singer and came in 3rd place on Idol in 2003. The next year David was asked to join the band Carnival. The band only released one single before disbanding in late 2006.

== Discography ==
Albums:

- Wild at Heart (2003)

Singles:

- Wild at Heart (2003)
- What the Hell (2003)
- For Your Eyes Only (2005) - with Carnival

== Norwegian Idol 2003 Performances ==
Audition: "Kryptonite" 3 Doors Down
Top 50: "With Arms Wide Open" by Creed
Top 10: "Kryptonite" 3 Doors Down
Top 9: "Drømmedame" by Trang Fødsel
Top 8: "Heaven" by Bryan Adams
Top 7: "Don't Let The Sun Go Down On Me" by Elton John
Top 6: "Play That Funky Music" by Wild Cherry
Top 5: "Ain't That A Kick In The Head" by Dean Martin
Top 4: "Lemon Tree" by Fool's Garden
Top 4: "Velvet" by Savoy
Top 3: "Wherever You Will Go" by The Calling
Top 3: "Dancing In The Moonlight" by Toploader
