= She's So High =

1999 single by Tal Bachman

Single by Tal Bachman

from the album Tal Bachman
- B-side: "Angeline"; "Superstar"; "Guilty"
- Released: February 13, 1999
- Studio: Plantation Mixing and Recording (Maui, Hawaii)
- Genre: Power pop
- Length: 3:44
- Label: Columbia
- Songwriter: Tal Bachman
- Producers: Tal Bachman; Bob Rock

Tal Bachman singles chronology
"She's So High" (1999)	"Strong Enough" (1999)

Music video
- "She's So High" on YouTube

"She's So High" is a power pop song written and performed by Canadian singer-songwriter Tal Bachman. It was released as a single to North American radio on February 13, 1999, from his self-titled debut album (1999). The song peaked at number three in Canada, topped the US Billboard Adult Top 40 chart, and reached number 14 on the Billboard Hot 100. It also became a top-10 hit in Australia and New Zealand and peaked at number 30 in the United Kingdom. American media group AllMusic named it an "album pick". The song won a BMI award and a Juno Award for Best Producer.

== Background and writing ==
Tal Bachman wrote the song about an experience that he had in high school when he was trying to get a girl to date his stepbrother. "I attempted to bribe the hottest girl in our high school to go out on a date with [my stepbrother]," Bachman told MTV News. "So as the conversation between me and what I thought was this godly, exalted woman progressed, I began to feel more and more uncomfortable and awkward, and so I just remember that feeling... I don't want to say fear, but just kind of being in awe of her." The song was produced by Bob Rock and was recorded in Maui. Bachman stated he played both his father's '62 Stratocaster and a 12-string electric on the song. He also said that he drew some inspiration in writing it from Sheryl Crow's song "If It Makes You Happy".

== Chart performance ==
The song debuted on Canada's RPM 100 Hit Tracks chart on April 19, 1999, at number 18, the highest new entry of the week. For the next few weeks, the song descended the chart, but it began to gain popularity and eventually reached its peak of number three on June 28. It stayed there for another week before beginning its slow descent off the chart, last appearing at number 100 on July 24, 2000, over a year after its first appearance. It was the eighth-best-selling single of 1999 in Canada. On other RPM charts, "She's So High" reached number three on the Rock Report and number 30 on the Adult Contemporary chart. In the United States, the song reached number 14 on the Billboard Hot 100 in August 1999, spending 28 weeks in the top 100, and peaked atop the Billboard Adult Top 40 chart in September for three weeks. It finished 1999 as the United States' 51st-most-successful song.

The song also found success in Australasia. It first appeared at number 44 on Australia's ARIA Singles Chart on the week of August 15, 1999. For the next four weeks, the song rose and fell in the top 30, then jumped to number 13 on September 19. It reached its peak of number eight the following week, then spent nine more nonconsecutive weeks in the top 50, ending the year as Australia's 54th-best-selling single. In New Zealand, "She's So High" debuted at number 46 on the RIANZ Singles Chart on October 3, 1999, then rose 37 positions to number nine—its peak position—the next week. It dropped to number 14 for two weeks, then to number 20 for another two weeks, then spent an additional four weeks in the top 50, logging 10 weeks on the chart altogether. Despite its short charting period, it came in at number 50 on New Zealand's year-end chart.

In the United Kingdom, the song entered the UK Singles Chart at number 30 on October 24, fell to number 51 the following week, then left the top 100 the week after. Elsewhere in Europe, the song peaked at number 29 in Iceland, number 71 in Germany, and number 93 in the Netherlands.

== Music video ==
The official music video features Yvonne Sciò dressed in angel's wings and World War II-era headgear, specifically a leather pilot cap with aviator's goggles. After stealing balloons from a clown on the street, she gives them to a little girl in exchange for a glass of water, and the girl is then lifted off the ground. Afterwards, Sciò places the glass on the street and attempts a highwire act above it between two buildings, to the curiosity of a crowd of onlookers. She concludes the act by diving into the glass, which is greeted with applause from the soaked crowd. The storyline is interspersed with shots of Bachman playing the song with his band.

== Track listings and formats ==
- Australian, European, and Japanese maxi-CD single
1. "She's So High" – 3:44
2. "Angeline" – 3:43
3. "Superstar" – 2:53
4. "Guilty" – 3:31
- European CD single
1. "She's So High" – 3:44
2. "Angeline" – 3:43
- UK cassette single
1. "She's So High" – 3:44
2. "Guilty" – 3:31
- UK CD single
1. "She's So High" – 3:44
2. "Angeline" – 3:43
3. "Paint a Pretty Picture" – 3:51

== Credits and personnel ==
Credits are taken from the Tal Bachman album booklet.

Studios

- Recorded and mixed at Plantation Mixing and Recording (Maui, Hawaii)
- Additional recording at the Shed (Vancouver, British Columbia)
- Mastered at Sterling Sound (New York City)

Musicians

- Tal Bachman – writing, lead and background vocals, lead guitar, lap steel guitar, rhythm guitar, piano, production, mixing
- Buck Johnson – background vocals, Wurlitzer, B3, Moog
- Chris Wyse – bass
- Lance Porter – drums

Technical

- Bob Rock – production, mixing
- Patrick Glover – additional recording engineer
- Brian Joseph Dobbs – engineering
- Mike Gillies – additional engineering
- George Marino – mastering

== Charts ==
=== Weekly charts ===
Chart (1999–2000)	Peak position
Australia (ARIA)	8
Canada Top Singles (RPM)	3
Canada Adult Contemporary (RPM)	30
Canada Rock/Alternative (RPM)	3
Canada CHR (Nielsen BDS)	4
Germany (GfK)	71
Iceland (Íslenski listinn Topp 40)	29
Netherlands (Single Top 100)	93
New Zealand (Recorded Music NZ)	9
Scottish Singles Sales (Official Charts)	34
UK Singles (Official Charts)	30
US Billboard Hot 100	14
US Adult Alternative Airplay (Billboard)	17
US Adult Pop Airplay (Billboard)	1
US Pop Airplay (Billboard)	6

=== Year-end charts ===
Chart (1999)	Position
Australia (ARIA)	54
Canada Top Singles (RPM)	8
Canada Rock/Alternative (RPM)	12
New Zealand (RIANZ)	50
US Billboard Hot 100	51
US Adult Top 40 (Billboard)	9
US Mainstream Top 40 (Billboard)	16

Chart (2000)	Position
US Adult Top 40 (Billboard)	32

== Certifications ==
Region	Certification	Certified units/sales
Australia (ARIA)	Gold	35,000^{^}
New Zealand (RMNZ)	2× Platinum	60,000^{‡}
United Kingdom (BPI)	Silver	200,000^{‡}
^{^} Shipments figures based on certification alone.^{‡} Sales+streaming figures based on certification alone.

== Release history ==
Region	Date	Format(s)	Label(s)	Ref.
Canada	February 13, 1999	Radio	Columbia	
United States	February 13, 1999	Alternative radio	Columbia	
United States	April 20, 1999	Contemporary hit radio	Columbia	
Japan	May 19, 1999	CD	SME	
United Kingdom	October 18, 1999	CD; cassette	Columbia	

== Use in media ==
Twenty years after its original North American release, the song was featured in a television advertisement for the Peloton stationary bicycle, broadly televised in late November 2019.

== Kurt Nilsen version ==
"She's So High"

Single by Kurt Nilsen

from the album I
- B-side: "Wedding's Off"
- Released: June 4, 2003
- Studio: Hitsville (Halden, Norway)
- Length: 4:06
- Label: RCA; BMG Norway; 19
- Songwriter: Tal Bachman
- Producer: Ole Evenrude

Kurt Nilsen singles chronology
"She's So High" (2003)	"Here She Comes" (2003)

Four years after Bachman's hit, Norwegian singer Kurt Nilsen's cover version of the song reached number one in Norway and was Norway's best-selling single ever, selling over 80,000 copies to earn an octuple (8×) platinum certification. It became an international hit a year later, achieving its best success in Flanders and the Netherlands, reaching the top 10 in these regions.

=== Track listings ===
- Norway: RCA, BMG / 82876528502 (2003)
- Europe: RCA / 82876 61088 2 (2004)

All tracks are written by Tal Bachman, except where noted.

CD single
No.	Title	Length
1.	"She's So High"	4:08
2.	"Wedding's Off" (written by Kurt Nilsen)	3:00

- Europe: BMG / 82876 597 612 (2004)

No.	Title	Length
1.	"She's So High"	4:08
2.	"She's So High" (instrumental)	4:08

- Europe: RCA / 82876 59828 2 (2004)

Enhanced CD single
No.	Title	Length
1.	"She's So High"	4:08
2.	"She's So High" (instrumental)	4:08
3.	"She's So High" (video on CD-ROM track)

=== Charts ===
==== Weekly charts ====
Chart (2003–2004)	Peak position
Australia (ARIA)	60
Austria (Ö3 Austria Top 40)	42
Belgium (Ultratop 50 Flanders)	9
Belgium (Ultratip Bubbling Under Wallonia)	4
Germany (GfK)	25
Netherlands (Dutch Top 40)	4
Netherlands (Single Top 100)	16
New Zealand (Recorded Music NZ)	38
Norway (VG-lista)	1
Scottish Singles Sales (Official Charts)	13
Switzerland (Schweizer Hitparade)	91
UK Singles (Official Charts)	25

Chart (2023)	Peak position
Poland (Polish Airplay Top 100)	76

==== Year-end charts ====
Chart (2004)	Position
Belgium (Ultratop 50 Flanders)	61
Netherlands (Dutch Top 40)	50
Netherlands (Single Top 100)	86

=== Certifications ===
Region	Certification	Certified units/sales
Norway (IFPI Norway)	8× Platinum	100,000

=== Release history ===
Region	Date	Format(s)	Label(s)	Ref.
Norway	June 4, 2003	CD	RCA; BMG Norway; 19	
Europe	February 9, 2004	CD	RCA; BMG Norway; 19	
Australia	March 8, 2004	CD	RCA; BMG Norway; 19	
United Kingdom	May 17, 2004	CD	RCA; BMG Norway; 19	
