= Alejandro Fuentes =

Norwegian singer (born 1987)

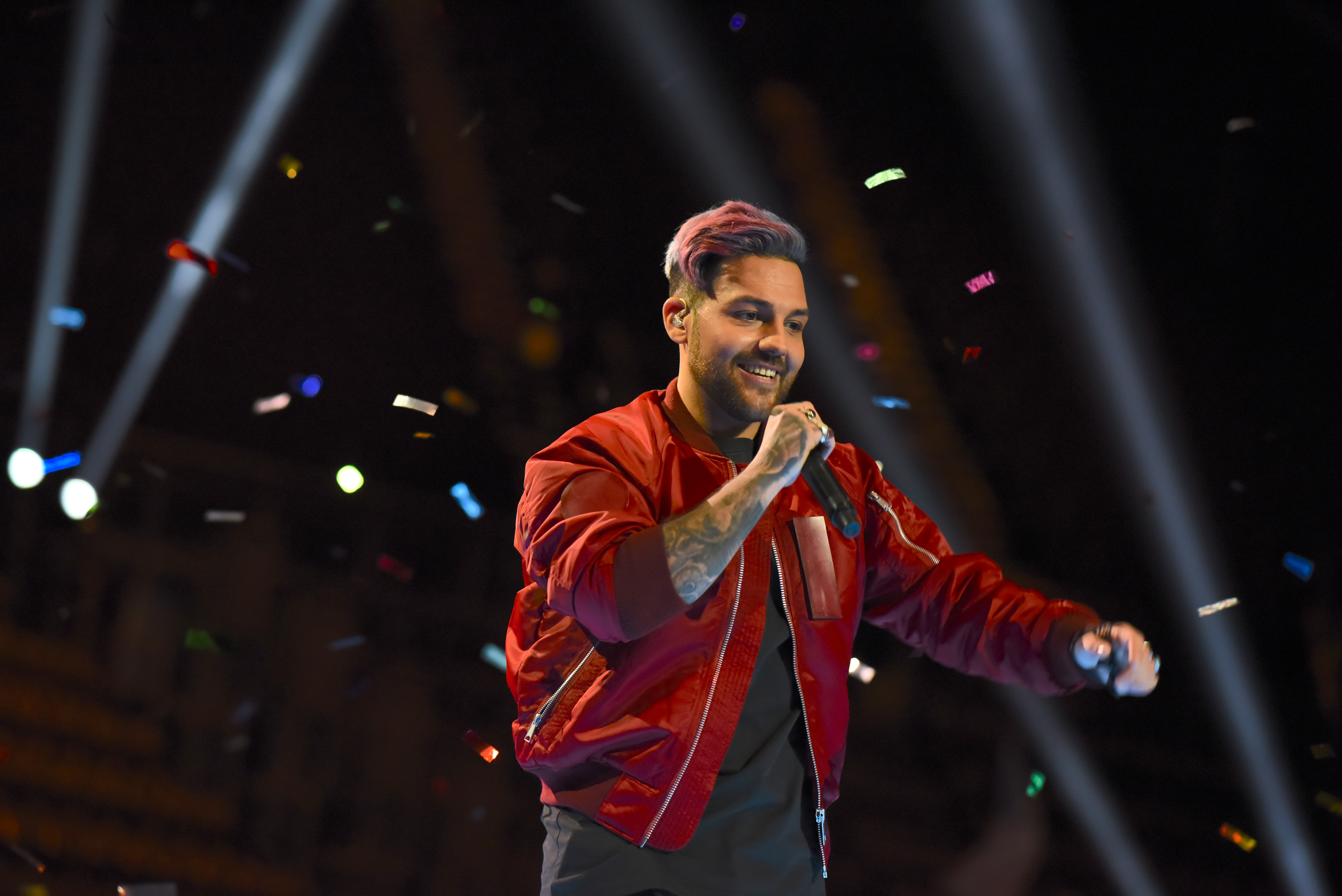
Fuentes in 2018

Alejandro Javiero Fuentes (born 5 November 1987) is a Norwegian singer of Chilean descent. He rose to prominence after finishing third in Norwegian Idol's third season in 2005. Later in 2005, he released the album Diamonds and Pearls, which reached gold by the end of the year.

== Career ==
In 2006, he and three other Norwegian artists, Askil Holm, Espen Lind, and Kurt Nilsen (winner of Norwegian Idol season 1 and World Idol) joined forces and went on tour in March as "The New Guitar Buddies" (De nye gitarkameratene). Their first album was Hallelujah Volume1. The album included covers of songs such as "Hallelujah" (Leonard Cohen); "Kiss From A Rose (Seal)", "I Won't Back Down" (Tom Petty).

The New Guitar Buddies regrouped in 2009 and made a second tour and a second album (Hallelujah Volume 2). This album includes songs such as: With Or Without You (U2), 50 Ways To Leave Your Lover (Paul Simon).

In 2010, his song "Hell If I" reached 1st in the Norwegian TOPS and in 2012 his last album All My Life was released.

He competed in Melodi Grand Prix 2018 in an attempt to represent Norway in the Eurovision Song Contest 2018 with the song "Tengo Otra".

In May 2020, he collaborated with The Booty Builder Company to release a new single, "Booty".

He competed in Melodi Grand Prix 2023 with the song "Fuego".
