= Kurt Nilsen =

Norwegian singer (born 1978)

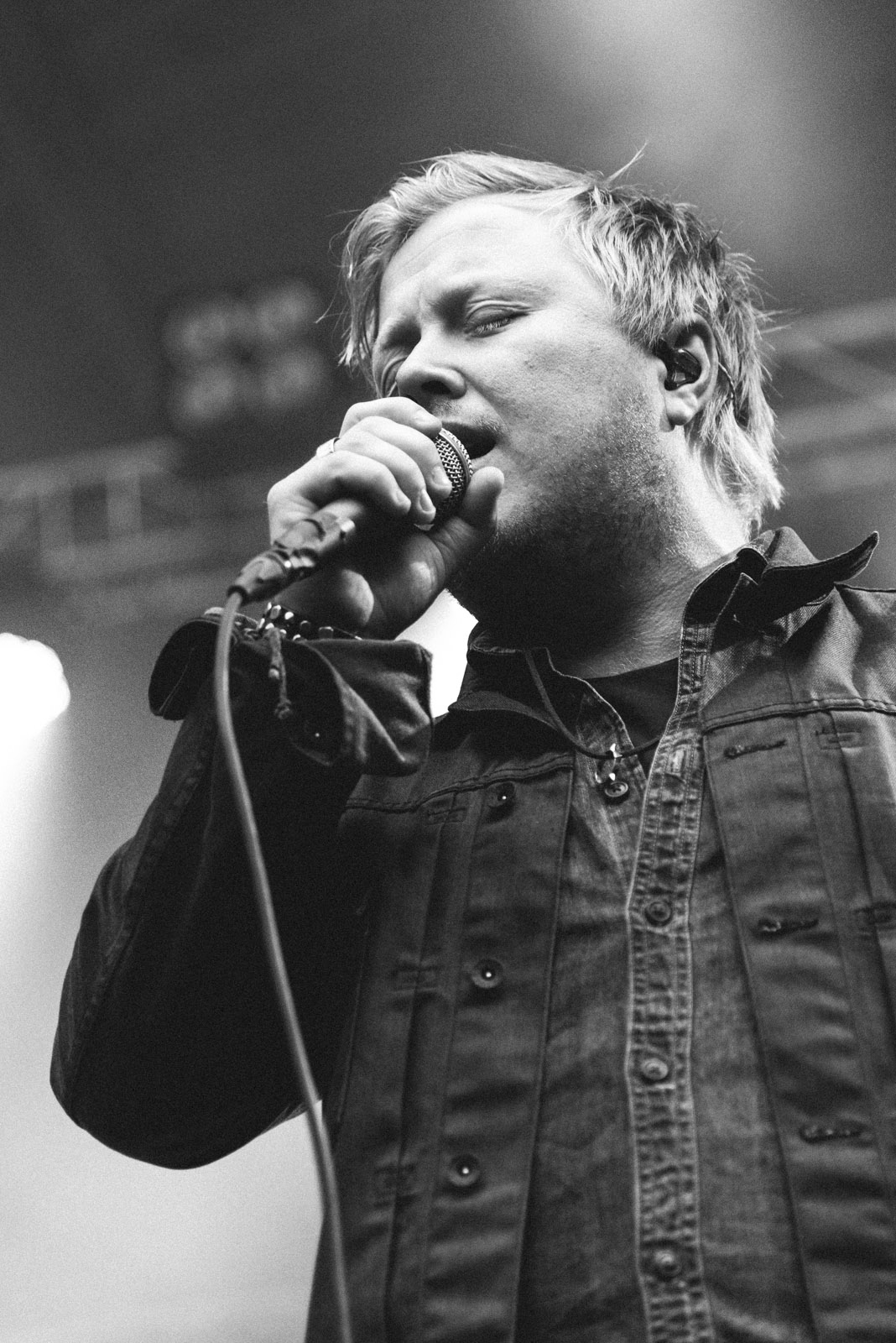
- Nilsen in 2013

Background information
- Also known as: Idol-Kurt
- Born: Kurt Erik Nilsen; 29 September 1978 (age 48); Bergen, Norway
- Genres: Pop; country
- Occupations: Singer; songwriter; multi-instrumentalist
- Instruments: Vocals; guitar; drums; bass; piano
- Years active: 2001–present
- Label: RCA
- Website: kurtnilsen.com

Kurt Erik Nilsen (Note: Norwegian pronunciation: [kʉʈː nɪ̀lsn̩]) (born 29 September 1978) is a Norwegian pop/country singer. He won the first season of the Norwegian reality show Idol, which aired on TV 2 in May 2003. He then won a one-off international version of Pop Idol called World Idol on 1 January 2004, featuring winners of the various national Idol shows.

== Career ==
=== Idol ===
Upon leaving school, Nilsen made his living as a plumber. Nilsen became the lead singer in the Norwegian band Fenrik Lane. He is a left-handed musician and plays his guitar with the strings upside down. He appeared on and won Norwegian Idol with 54% of the votes against Gaute Ormåsen. He is one of only seven contestants in the Norwegian Idol history who succeeded in staying out of the "bottom three/two" places in weekly votes.

His subsequent single, "She's So High", written by Tal Bachman, went straight to number one in the Norwegian VG-lista singles chart and is among the biggest-selling singles in Norway to date. His debut album was simply called I.

=== World Idol ===
He subsequently won the title for the World Idol on 1 January 2004, singing the hit "Beautiful Day" by U2, beating competitors from ten other nations, including the more famous Idol winners, Britain's Will Young, and favourite Kelly Clarkson of the United States, and scoring the first place in 10 out of 11 countries eligible to vote for him (Norwegian voters being unable to vote for him).

In the show presenting the entries on 25 December, Ian Dickson, the Australian judge, said: "Kurt, you are a hell of a marketing challenge, because you have the voice of an angel, but you look like a Hobbit." The comment made Nilsen laugh out loud.

=== Post-Idol career ===
His second CD, A Part of Me, released in 2004, contains only his own material.

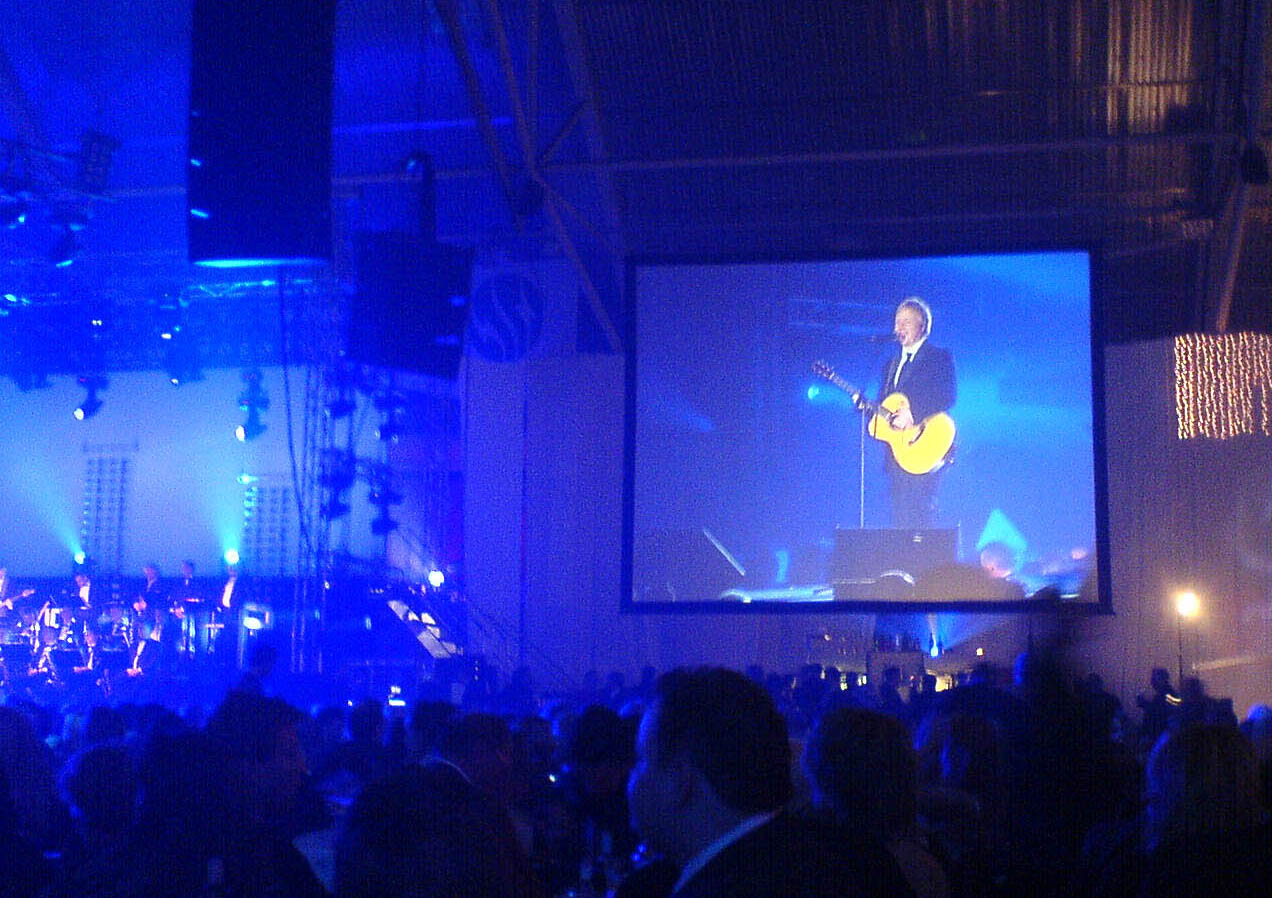
Kurt Nilsen performing in Oslo, Norway

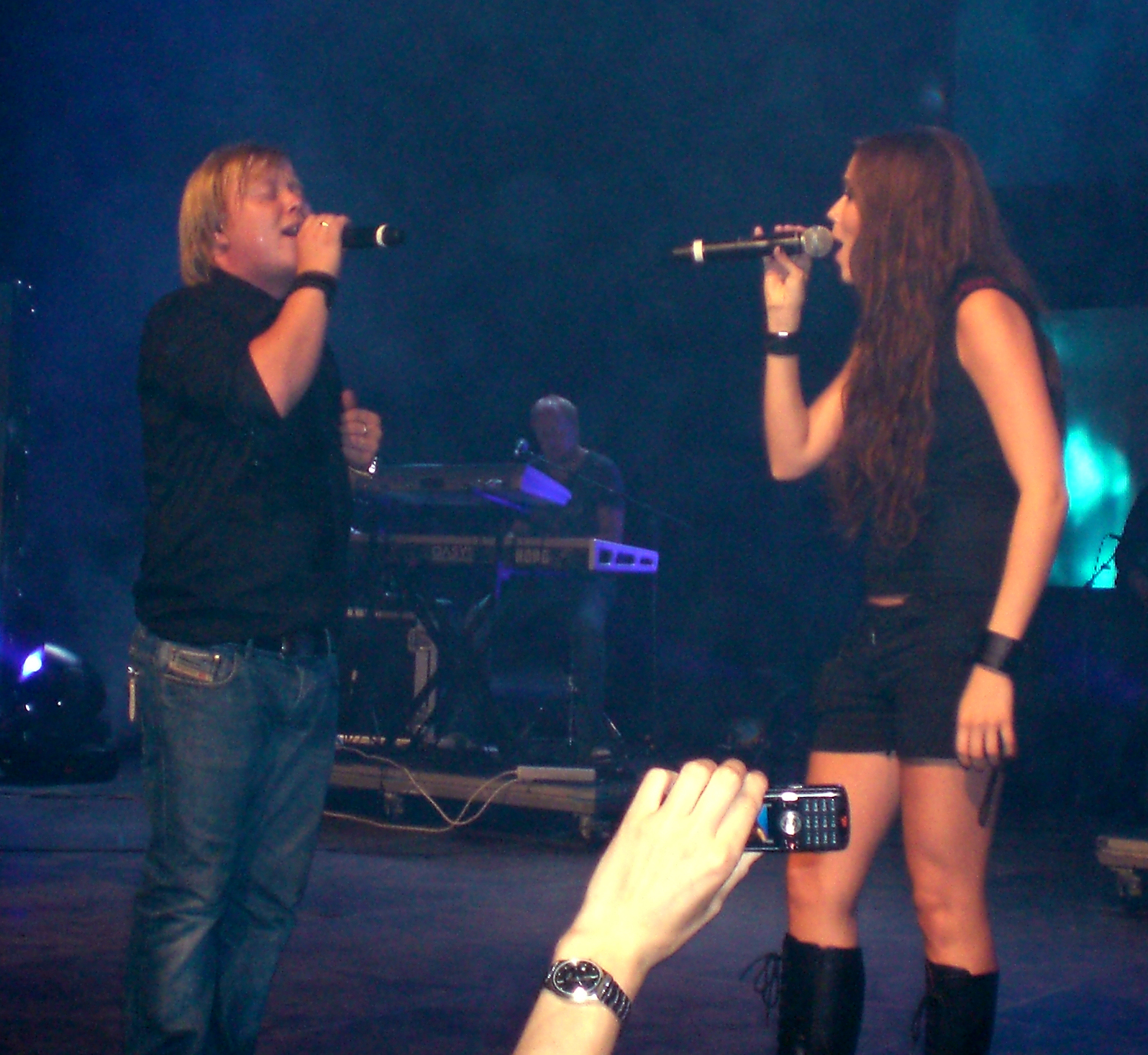
Kurt Nilsen and Marion Raven performing "It's All Coming Back to Me Now" at Tusenfryd amusement park for employees of StatoilHydro, 22. August 2007.

Nilsen performed the duet, "It's All Coming Back to Me Now", alongside Norwegian Pop/Alternative Rocker, Marion Raven at the One Call Event. Taking the place of Meat Loaf, with whom Raven recorded the track for the album Bat Out of Hell III

In 2006, he and three other Norwegian artists Askil Holm, Espen Lind, and Alejandro Fuentes, all in the same management, joined forces and went on tour in March as what was known by the media as "The New Guitar Buddies".

Initially, they planned a short tour (five to six concerts), but ended up playing for more than 100,000 people during their tour of around 30 concerts. Although they had not planned to, they subsequently released a live album from that tour.

Nilsen performed the duet "When You're Gone" alongside English pop singer, and former-Spice Girls member, Melanie C at the Top 20 event at Rådhusplassen in Oslo, Norway in the summer of 2007.

In 2008, in connection with his latest and country-flavoured album Rise to the Occasion Kurt teamed up with American music legend Willie Nelson to perform the old country music standard "Lost Highway". The song was an instant hit in his native Norway and helped him top both the singles chart, the album chart, and the radio chart all at once.

In 2009, "The New Guitar Buddies" was back with a new tour and a new album, including one concert on 9 May 2009 at Rockefeller Oslo.

Spring 2010 saw Kurt touring Norway with an acoustic concert tour in intimate concert halls. His guest artist was Elin Gaustad, who was a competitor in Norway's first X Factor show in 2009. In late February 2010, Kurt and Elin sang the duet "The Water is Wide" on the TV2 show Senkveld, to great acclaim.

In 2010, Kurt recorded a Christmas song album entitled Have Yourself a Merry Little Christmas with the Kringkastingsorkester (KORK), the Norwegian Radio Orchestra. It was released on 15 November 2010 in Norway. He performed with this orchestra and some guest artists at Lillestrøm messecenter, near Oslo on 18 December 2010. It was broadcast live on NRK television. The album stayed at the top of the Norwegian Albums Chart for 5 consecutive weeks (48/2010 to 52/2010)

2011 saw Kurt going on the road on a new tour in addition to playing at several music festivals and venues.

On 15 September 2012, it was announced on the official Norwegian Idol website that Kurt would be the second of an all-new four-member jury of former Idol contestants to celebrate 10 years since the debut of Idol in Norway. Another judge joining in was season three runner-up Tone Damli Aaberge.

== Personal life ==
In January 2005, Nilsen broke up with his fiancée, Kristine Jacobsen. They had been together for 11 years and had two children together: Marte (born 1996) and Erik (born 2000). In January 2006, Kurt's new girlfriend Kristin gave birth to her first and Nilsen's third child, Lucas. They married later that year, then separated in May 2013.

Nilsen has received national attention for his guitar-shaped alpine hut, in the Hardangervidda in Norway.

== Discography ==
Kurt Nilsen discography
- Studio albums: 7
- Singles: 17
- Collaborations: 3

The following is a discography of albums and singles released by Norwegian music artist Kurt Nilsen.

=== Studio albums ===
Title	Details	Chart positions							Sales	Certifications
Title	Details	NOR	AUT	BEL	GER	NL	SWE	SWI	Sales	Certifications
I	Released: 8 September 2003; Released: 15 March 2004 (International version of I, includes "Beautiful Day"); Label: Sony BMG	1	58	8	19	51	—	69	NOR: 75,000	
A Part of Me	Released: 8 November 2004; Label: RCA	2	—	—	—	—	—	—		NOR: Platinum
Push Push	Released: October 2007; Label: RCA	2	—	—	—	—	—	—		
Rise to the Occasion	Released: April 2008; Label: RCA	1	—	—	—	—	39	—	NOR: 95,000	NOR: 3× Platinum
Have Yourself a Merry Little Christmas	Released: 2010; Label: RCA	1	—	—	—	—	—	—		NOR: 9× Platinum
Inni en god periode	Released: 2013; Label: Sony Music	1	—	—	—	—	—	—		
Amazing	Released: 10 February 2017; Label: Sony Music	4	—	—	—	—	—	—		

=== Live albums ===
Title	Details	Chart positions	Sales
Title	Details	NOR	Sales
Hallelujah – Live	with Espen Lind, Askil Holm and Alejandro Fuentes; Released: 12 June 2006; Label: RCA	1	NOR: 240,000
Hallelujah – Live Volume 2	with Espen Lind, Askil Holm and Alejandro Fuentes; Released: 2009; Label: RCA	1	
Kurt Nilsen Live	Released: 2013; Label: Sony Music	3	

=== Singles ===
Title	Year	Chart positions										Album
Title	Year	NOR	AUS	AUT	BEL	GER	NL	NZ	SWE	SWI	UK	Album
"She's So High"	2003	1	60	42	9	25	16	38	—	91	25	I
"Here She Comes"	2004	12	—	—	53	—	—	—	—	—	—	I
"All You Have to Offer"	2004	—	—	—	—	—	—	—	—	—	—	I
"My Street"	2004	—	—	—	—	—	—	—	—	—	—	A Part of Me
"Before You Leave"	2004	—	—	—	52	—	—	—	—	—	—	A Part of Me
"Never Easy"	2005	—	—	—	—	—	—	—	—	—	—	A Part of Me
"When the Stars Go Blue" (featuring Venke Knutson)	2006	14	—	—	—	—	—	—	—	—	—	Venke Knutson's Places I've Been
"Hallelujah" (with Espen Lind, Askil Holm and Alejandro Fuentes)	2006	1	—	—	—	—	—	—	—	—	—	Hallelujah – Live
"Boys of Summer" (with Espen Lind, Askil Holm and Alejandro Fuentes)	2006	12	—	—	—	—	—	—	—	—	—	Hallelujah – Live
"Push, Push"	2007	1	—	—	—	—	—	—	—	—	—	Push Push
"Silence"	2007	9	—	—	—	—	—	—	—	—	—	Push Push
"Reality Kicks"	2008	20	—	—	—	—	—	—	—	—	—	Push Push
"Lost Highway" (featuring Willie Nelson)	2008	1	—	—	—	—	—	—	—	—	—	Rise to the Occasion
"Don't Have What It Takes"	2008	19	—	—	—	—	—	—	—	—	—	Rise to the Occasion
"Rise to the Occasion"	2008	—	—	—	—	—	—	—	38	—	—	Rise to the Occasion
"With or Without You" (with Espen Lind, Askil Holm and Alejandro Fuentes)	2009	1	—	—	—	—	—	—	—	—	—	Hallelujah – Live Volume 2
"Himmel på jord"	2010	4	—	—	—	—	—	—	—	—	—	Have Yourself a Merry Little Christmas
"Adieu"	2013	9	—	—	—	—	—	—	—	—	—	Non-album singles
"Engler i sneen" (with Lene Marlin)	2013	7	—	—	—	—	—	—	—	—	—	Non-album singles
"Stjernesludd"	2014	16	—	—	—	—	—	—	—	—	—	Have Yourself a Merry Little Christmas
"Gje meg handa di venn" (with Helene Bøksle)	2014	23	—	—	—	—	—	—	—	—	—	Have Yourself a Merry Little Christmas
"Nå tennes tusen julelys" (with KORK)	2014	24	—	—	—	—	—	—	—	—	—	Have Yourself a Merry Little Christmas
"Amazing"	2017	19	—	—	—	—	—	—	—	—	—	Amazing
"Lov å ønske"	2025	63	—	—	—	—	—	—	—	—	—	Non-album single

=== Other releases ===
- 1998 Shoe (with former band Breed; later Fenrik Lane)
- 2002 Come Down Here (EP) (Norwegian album charts: #2) (with Fenrik Lane)
- 2003 Idol '03 (Norwegian album charts: #1)
- 2011 Mitt lille land, with other artists

== See also ==
- World Idol

Preceded by None	Idol (Norway); Winner; 2003	Succeeded by Kjartan Salvesen
Preceded by None	World Idol; Winner; 2004	Succeeded by None
