= Tal Bachman =

Canadian singer-songwriter and guitarist from Manitoba

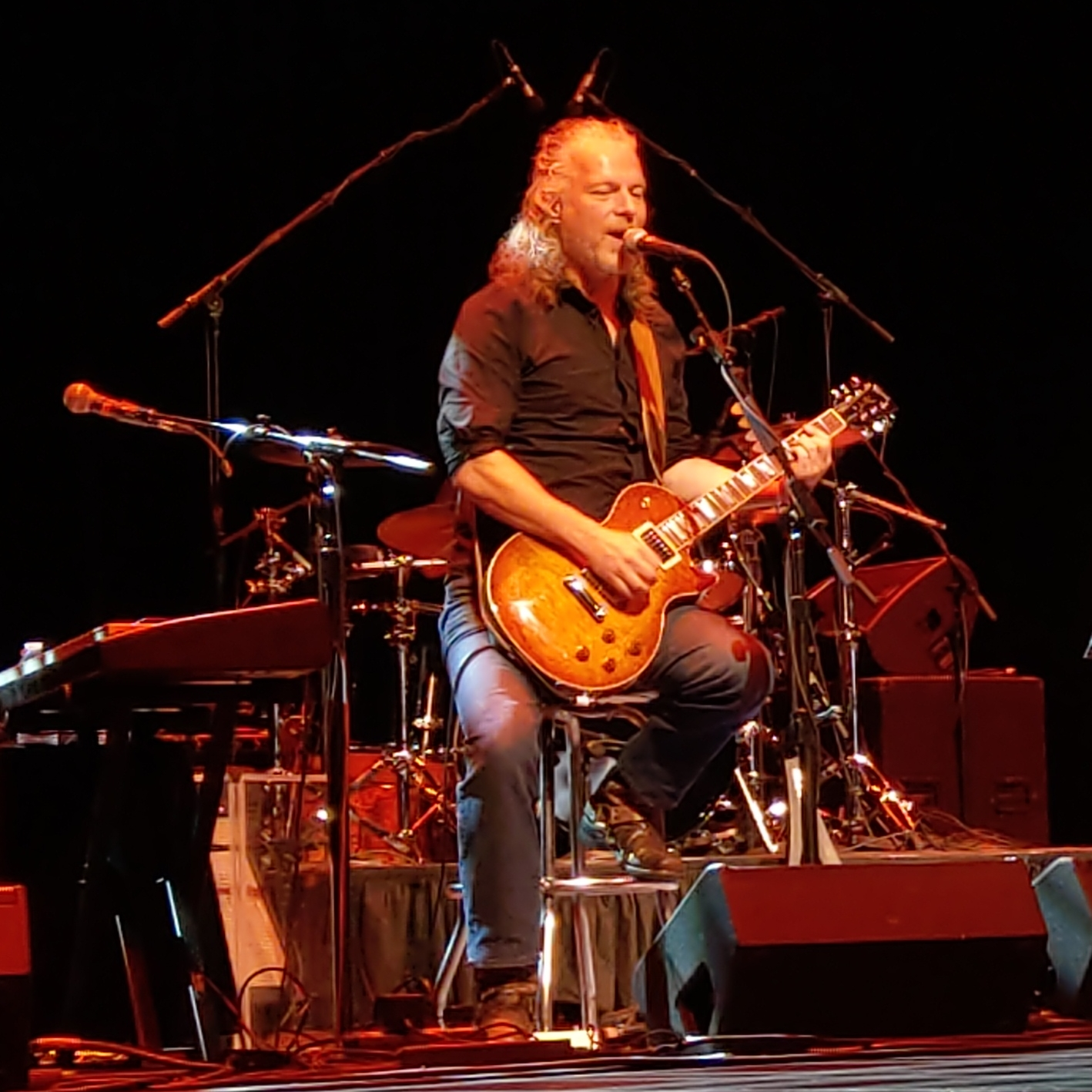
- Bachman performing in 2018

Background information
- Also known as: Tal Bachman
- Born: Talmage Robert Bachman; August 13, 1968 (age 58)
- Origin: Winnipeg, Manitoba, Canada
- Genres: Pop rock
- Occupations: Singer-songwriter
- Instruments: Vocals, guitar
- Years active: 1992–present
- Labels: Columbia; Sextant; Daylight
- Member of: Randy Bachman, Bachman–Turner Overdrive

Talmage Charles Robert Bachman (/ˈbækmən/ BAK-mən; born August 13, 1968) is a Canadian singer-songwriter and guitarist. He is best known for his 1999 hit "She's So High", a pop rock song from his self-titled 1999 album for which he won a BMI award in 2000. Along with his father, Randy Bachman, he is currently a member of Bachman–Turner Overdrive.

== Biography ==
=== Early life ===
Bachman was born in Winnipeg, the son of Randy Bachman and the nephew of Robbie Bachman of the classic rock bands the Guess Who and Bachman–Turner Overdrive. As a child, Bachman listened to his father's enormous record collection and taught himself to play guitar. He studied political philosophy at Utah State University but dropped out and moved to Vancouver in 1995 to begin writing songs.

=== Musical career ===
After Bachman was rejected by many record labels, executives at EMI Music Publishing in New York City heard a demo tape of his ballad "If You Sleep" and offered him a recording contract with Columbia Records. His debut album, Tal Bachman, was co-produced by Bob Rock and including the hit single, "She's So High", which was inspired by the song "If It Makes You Happy" by Sheryl Crow, using the same chords but a different key. The song reached No. 1 on three different radio formats in Canada and reached number 14 on the Billboard Hot 100 in August 1999. It won BMI's "Song of the Year" award. The album earned Bachman two Juno awards in Canada. Bachman then toured as an opening act for Bryan Adams and the Barenaked Ladies, and also toured on his own. Bachman's second album, Staring Down the Sun, was released in Canada on Sextant Records in August 2004 and was released in the United States by Artemis Records in 2006. The single "Aeroplane" reached number 20 on the Canadian charts and was used in the 2005 film, American Pie Presents: Band Camp. It was played as an instrumental and during the credits.

In 2005, Bachman was invited to be a musical ambassador for Canada in South Africa and Zimbabwe, receiving a C$16,500 grant to visit AIDS hospices and orphanages and community centres.

In 2023, Bachman joined Bachman–Turner Overdrive.

== Influences ==
Bachman cites the Beatles, Cheap Trick, and Electric Light Orchestra as influences.

== Personal life ==
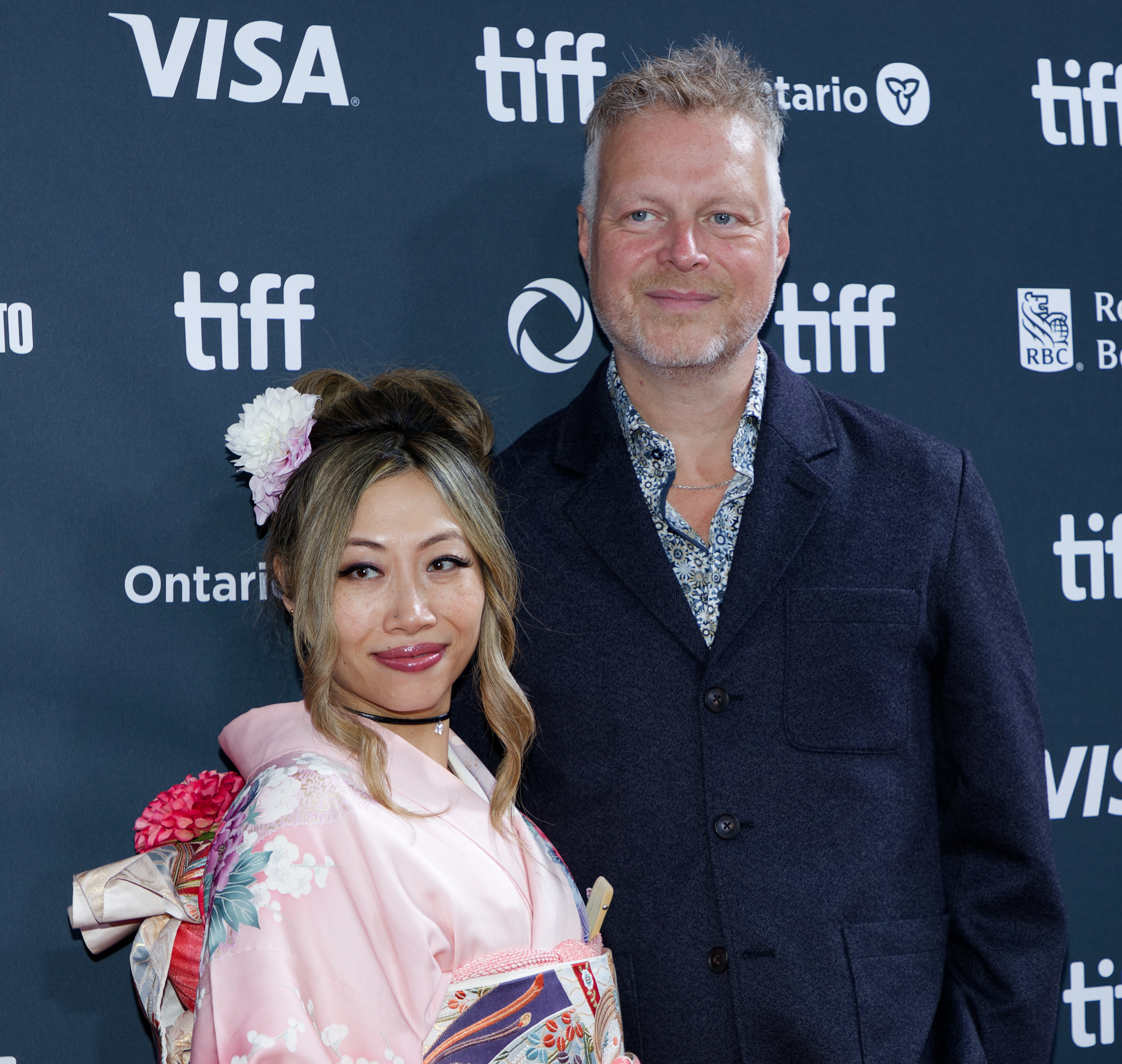
Tal and KoKo at the 2024 Toronto International Film Festival

Bachman is a former member of the Church of Jesus Christ of Latter-day Saints (LDS Church), and went on a two-year Mormon mission to Argentina. In the early 2000s, he began doubting his faith. After two years of research, Bachman concluded that the church's founder Joseph Smith had invented his stories, and Bachman severed his ties to the church. In 2006, Bachman was interviewed for The Mormons, a PBS documentary in which he discussed his departure from the LDS Church. In 2008, Bachman also discussed his departure from the LDS Church when interviewed for the Bill Maher documentary Religulous.

Bachman has written political articles in American Greatness and SteynOnline. Several of his articles discuss religion and rugby.

Bachman plays right-wing and outside-centre for the Victoria, British Columbia rugby union club Castaway Wanderers RFC.

== Discography ==
=== Studio albums ===
| Title | Album details | Chart positions |
| Title | Album details | US |
|---|---|---|
| Tal Bachman | Release date: April 13, 1999; Label: Columbia | 124 |
| Staring Down the Sun | Release date: July 13, 2004; Label: Sextant | — |

=== Compilation albums ===
| Title | Album details |
|---|---|
| Ian Starglow's Greatest Hits Vol. 1 (as Ian Starglow) | Release date: December 9, 2019; Label: Self-release |

=== Singles ===
| Title | Year | Chart positions | | | | | | | | Album |
| Title | Year | CAN | CAN AC | AUS | GER | NZ | UK | US | US Adult | Album |
|---|---|---|---|---|---|---|---|---|---|---|
| "She's So High" | 1999 | 3 | 30 | 8 | 71 | 9 | 30 | 14 | 1 | Tal Bachman |
| "Strong Enough" | 1999 | 31 | 59 | — | — | — | — | — | — | Tal Bachman |
| "If You Sleep" | 1999 | 61 | — | — | — | — | — | — | 35 | Tal Bachman |
| "Aeroplane" | 2004 | 20 | — | — | — | — | — | — | — | Staring Down the Sun |
| "Na Na Na" | 2019 | — | — | — | — | — | — | — | — | Ian Starglow's Greatest Hits Volume 1 |

== Awards ==
Third Annual Canadian Radio Music Awards (2000)

- Best New Solo Artist – Rock
- Best New Solo Artist – Pop Adult
- Best New Solo Artist – Contemporary Hit Radio

29th Annual Juno Awards (2000)

- Best New Solo Artist (won)
- Best Producer (with Bob Rock) for "She's So High" and "If You Sleep" (won)
- Best Pop/Adult Album (nominated)
- Best Songwriter (nominated)
