= Espen Lind =

Norwegian record producer

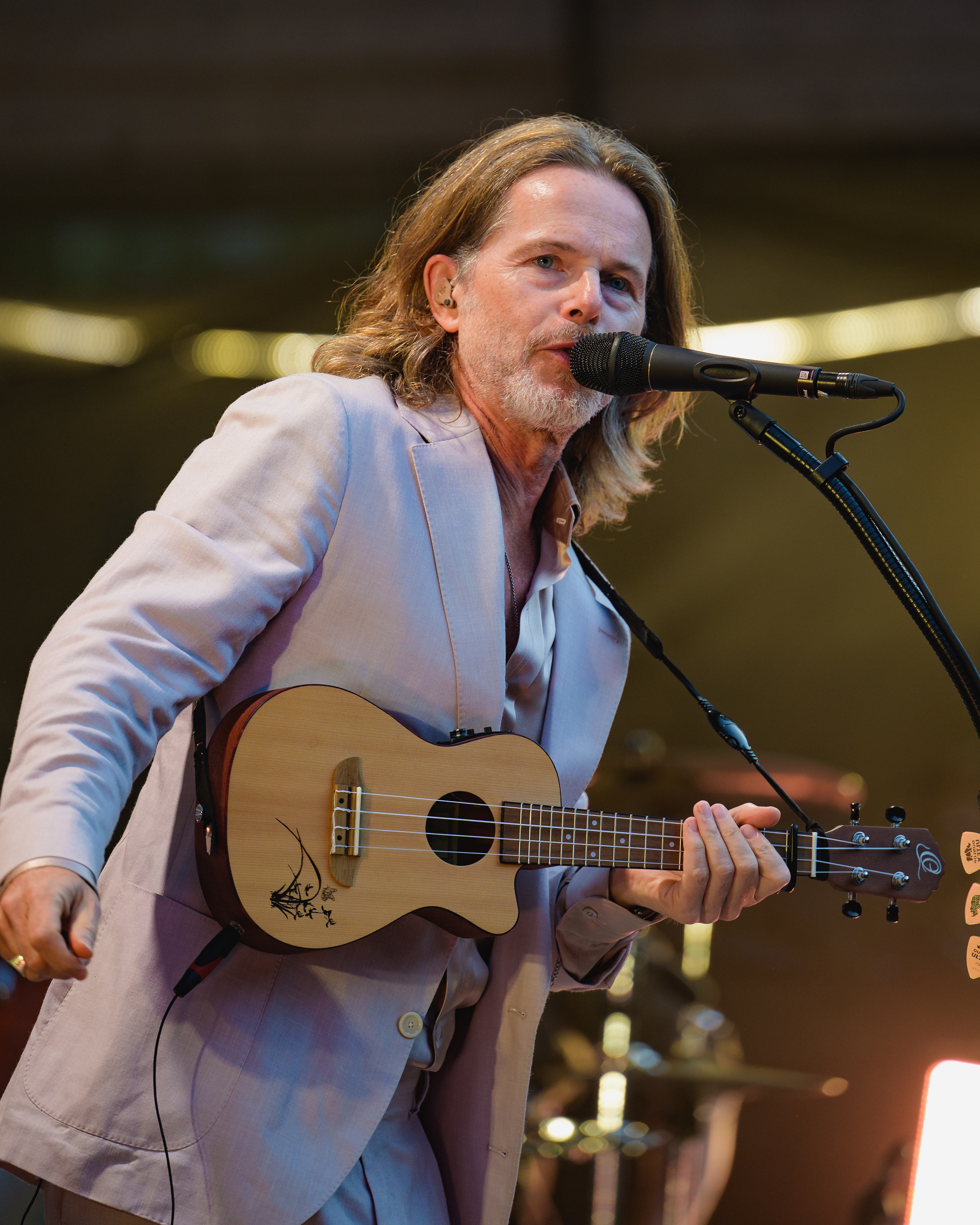

Background information
- Born: 13 May 1971 (age 55)
- Origin: Tromsø, Norway
- Genres: Pop; rock; acoustic
- Occupations: Record producer; songwriter; singer
- Years active: 1995–present
- Label: Universal

Espen Lind (born 13 May 1971) is a Norwegian record producer, songwriter, singer, and multi-instrumentalist. He is one half of the production team Espionage, and together with his long time professional partner Amund Bjorklund he has written and/or produced songs for artists like Taylor Swift, Beyoncé, Train, Jennifer Hudson, Emeli Sandé and Selena Gomez. Espen has also been a mentor on the Norwegian version of The Voice.

== Solo records ==
Espen Lind released his first solo album, Mmm...Prepare to Be Swayed, in 1995 under the moniker "Sway". Only released in Norway, it received mixed reviews and sold approximately 5,000 copies. His commercial breakthrough came in 1997 with the single "When Susannah Cries", which was a hit in several European and Latin American countries, including Norway, where it was number one for six weeks. His second album Red went on to sell more than 100,000 copies in Norway, and 350,000 copies worldwide, earning Lind three Norwegian Grammy awards (Spellemannprisen) in 1998, including Artist of the Year.

2000 saw Lind releasing his third album, This Is Pop Music, and the singles "Black Sunday" and "Life Is Good". The album also contains a duet, "Where the Lost Ones Go", with Norwegian singer Sissel Kyrkjebø. The album reached gold status in Norway but was generally perceived to be a commercial disappointment compared to its predecessor. After a 3-year break Lind released a new single, "Unloved", in December 2004, followed by the album April, in January 2005.

In 2006, Lind, together with fellow Norwegian artists Kurt Nilsen (World Idol winner), Alejandro Fuentes and Askil Holm released the concert album Hallelujah Live, featuring songs from the foursome's solo records as well as several songs by other artists, most notably a cover version of Leonard Cohen's "Hallelujah".

Lind released a new single, "Scared of Heights", in May 2008. His fifth album titled Army of One was released on 23 June 2008.

In January 2009, he received the award "Årets Spelleman" (artist of the year) at the Norwegian Grammy Awards.

== Writing and producing ==
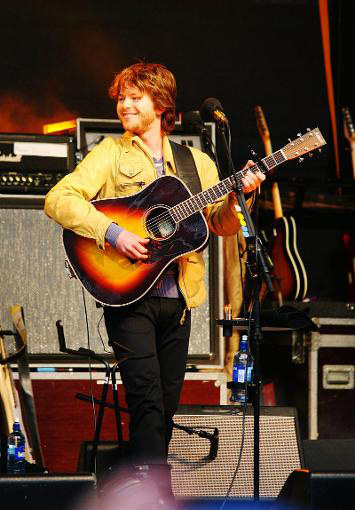
Espen Lind performing in Norway

Espen Lind has written and produced music for a number of artist, such as "Irreplaceable" by Beyoncé and "Drive By" and "Hey, Soul Sister" by Train. Together with writing partner Amund Bjørklund in the production team Espionage he has also written and/or produced songs for artists Taylor Swift, Lionel Richie, Ne-Yo, Chris Brown and Leona Lewis. Morten Harket covered Lind's "Scared of Heights" for his album Out of My Hands. In 2025, Lind composed and produced the soundtrack for the TV-show "Requiem for Selina".

=== Selected credits ===
- "Enough" – Emeli Sandé
- "Sing Together" – Train
- "Mermaid" – Train, No. 12 Billboard Adult Pop Songs
- "Bruises" – Train, No. 79 Billboard Hot 100
- "50 Ways to Say Goodbye" – Train, No. 20 Billboard Hot 100
- "Drive By" – Train, No. 10 Billboard Hot 100
- "Brick By Brick" – Train
- "Hey, Soul Sister" – Train, No. 3 Billboard Hot 100
- "Half Moon Bay" – Train
- "Can't Stop the Rain" – Jennifer Hudson
- "Pastime" – Lionel Richie
- "My Little Secret" – Cavo
- "Ghost" – Cavo
- "I Need a Girl" – Trey Songz – No. 6 Billboard Hot R&B/Hip-Hop Songs
- "Irreplaceable" – Beyoncé – No. 1 Billboard Hot 100
- "With You" – Chris Brown – No. 2 Billboard Hot 100
- "Angel" – Leona Lewis
- "Now You Tell Me" – Jordin Sparks
- "Just for the Record" – Jordin Sparks
- "Go On Girl" – Ne-Yo
- "One Word" – Elliott Yamin
- "I Don't Wanna Care" – Jessica Simpson
- "The One That Got Away" – Johnta Austin
- "Underdog" – Jonas Brothers
- "The Very First Night" - Taylor Swift
- "I Will Be With You" – Sarah Brightman/Paul Stanley
- "The Last Goodbye" – Atomic Kitten
- "Cry" – Kym Marsh
- "Come Back To Me" – David Cook – No. 6 Billboard Hot Adult Top 40 Tracks
- "Life on the Moon" – David Cook
- "Lie" – David Cook
- "It's Gotta Be Love" – Lee DeWyze
- "Stay Here" – Lee DeWyze

== Discography ==
The following is a discography of albums and singles released by Norwegian music artist Espen Lind.

=== Albums ===
Statistics	Singles
Mmm... Prepare To Be Swayed: Released as Sway; Released: 1995; Peak chart positions: # 29 NOR; Label: MCA Records	"Yum Yum Gimme Some"; "Blast Yer Brain"
Red: Released as Sway; Released: 20 May 1997; Peak chart positions: # 3 NOR; Label: Universal	"American Love"; "Baby You're So Cool"; "When Susannah Cries"
Red: Re-release of the second Sway album; Released: 1997; Peak chart positions: # 3 NOR; # 15 SWI; # 19 GER; # 25 AUT; # 31 BEL (VL); # 50 NL; Label: Universal	"When Susannah Cries"; "Lucky For You"; "American Love"
This Is Pop Music: Released: 2001; Peak chart positions: # 3 NOR; Label: Universal	"Black Sunday"; "Where the Lost Ones Go" (duet with Sissel Kyrkjebø); "Life Is Good"
April: Released: 2005; Peak chart positions: # 3 NOR; Label: Universal	"Unloved"; "Look Like Her"; "Million Miles Away"
Hallelujah – Live: with Kurt Nilsen, Askil Holm and Alejandro Fuentes; Released: 12 June 2006; Peak chart positions: # 1 NOR; Label: Sony BMG/Universal	"Hallelujah"; "The Boys Of Summer"; "Norsk Medley"
Army of One: Released: 2008; Peak chart positions: # 1 NOR; Label: Universal	"Scared of Heights"; "Sweet Love"
Hallelujah – Live Volume 2: with Kurt Nilsen, Askil Holm and Alejandro Fuentes; Released: 2009; Peak chart positions: # 1 NOR; Label: Sony BMG/Universal	"With or Without You"
Requiem for Selina - Original Series Soundtrack: with Espen Lind, The Norwegian Radio Orchestra; Released: 2025; Peak chart positions: n/a; Label: Vitamin Oslo/Universal	"Selina's Theme"

=== Singles ===
Year	Title	Chart positions										Album
Year	Title	NOR	AUT	BEL (VL)	BEL (WA)	FRA	GER	NL	SWE	SWI	UK	Album
1995	"Yum Yum Gimme Some" (as Sway)	17	—	—	—	—	—	—	—	—	—	Mmm... Prepare To Be Swayed
1995	"American Love" (as Sway)	N/A	—	—	—	—	—	—	—	—	—	Red
1997	"Baby You're So Cool" (as Sway)	N/A	—	—	—	—	—	—	—	—	—	Red
1997	"When Susannah Cries" (as Sway)	1	—	—	—	—	—	—	—	—	—	Red
1997	"When Susannah Cries" [new release]	1	10	2	21	41	9	10	34	5	185	Red [new version]
1997	"Lucky For You"	N/A	—	—	—	—	82	—	—	—	—	Red [new version]
1998	"American Love"	N/A	—	—	—	—	—	—	—	—	—	Red [new version]
2000	"Black Sunday"	4	—	—	—	—	—	—	—	—	—	This Is Pop Music
2001	"Where the Lost Ones Go" (with Sissel Kyrkjebø)	N/A	—	—	—	—	—	90	—	—	—	This Is Pop Music
2002	"Life Is Good"	N/A	—	—	—	—	99	—	—	—	—	This Is Pop Music
2004	"Unloved"	1	—	—	—	—	—	—	—	—	—	April
2005	"Look Like Her"	N/A	—	—	—	—	—	—	—	—	—	April
2005	"Million Miles Away"	N/A	—	—	—	—	—	—	—	—	—	April
2006	"Hallelujah" (with Kurt Nilsen, Askil Holm and Alejandro Fuentes)	1	—	—	—	—	—	—	—	—	—	Hallelujah – Live
2006	"The Boys of Summer" (with Kurt Nilsen, Askil Holm and Alejandro Fuentes)	12	—	—	—	—	—	—	—	—	—	Hallelujah – Live
2008	"Scared of Heights"	1	—	—	—	—	—	—	—	—	—	Army of One
2008	"Sweet Love"	N/A	—	—	—	—	—	—	—	—	—	Army of One
2009	"With or Without You" (with Kurt Nilsen, Askil Holm and Alejandro Fuentes)	1	—	—	—	—	—	—	—	—	—	Hallelujah – Live Volume 2
2026	"Sangen om mitt liv" (with Hver gang vi møtes)	55	—	—	—	—	—	—	—	—	—	Non-album singles
2026	"Hjemme" (with Hver gang vi møtes)	55	—	—	—	—	—	—	—	—	—	Non-album singles

Awards
Preceded by Unni Wilhelmsen and Ivar Eidem	Recipient of the best Pop solo artist Spellemannprisen; 1997	Succeeded by Bertine Zetlitz
Preceded by No Artist of the year award	Recipient of the Artist of the year Spellemannprisen; 1997	Succeeded by Vidar Busk
Preceded by Hellbillies	Recipient of the Spellemannprisen as Spellemann of the Year; 2008	Succeeded by Alexander Rybak
