= Venke Knutson =

Norwegian singer (born 1978)

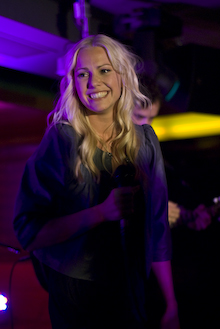
- Live in Bergen, Norway, 2008. Photographer: Pascual Strømsnæs.

Background information
- Born: 20 October 1978 (age 47); Birkeland, Norway
- Genres: Pop
- Occupations: Singer, songwriter, school teacher
- Instruments: Vocals, guitar, drums
- Years active: 2003–present
- Label: Universal

Venke Knutson (born 20 October 1978) is a Norwegian singer. Since 2003, she has had six top 10 hits in Norway.

== Life and career ==
Venke Knutson was born in Birkeland, in 1978. She was the youngest of three sisters, in a musical family, and she got inspired to sing by her elder sisters.

Early in her life she lived with her family in the United States.

She joined the school choir. Inspired by two older sisters, she applied for music at the Vågsbygd skole (Vågsbygd High School), when the family was about to go back home to Norway.

She used to be an elementary teacher in Norway. She was earlier married to Svenn Kåre Liodden, but they divorced. She married Thomas Wold in 2008.

She debuted in 2003 with the single "Panic", followed by her first album Scared and the singles "Scared" and "Kiss".

Venke Knutson entered the qualifying rounds of the Melodi Grand Prix 2010 (the Norwegian selection process for the Eurovision Song Contest) on 16 January and was voted through to the national "second chance" program, with the song "Jealous 'Cause I Love You", where she was voted through to the national final.

== Discography ==
=== Albums ===
| Year | Title | Chart positions | Sales |
| Year | Title | NO | Sales |
|---|---|---|---|
| 2004 | Scared | 5 | Norwegian sales: 30.000 |
| 2005 | Places I Have Been | 7 | Norwegian sales: 20.000 |
| 2007 | Crush | 14 | Norwegian sales: 10.000 |
| 2010 | Smiles – The Very Best Of | 9 | Norwegian sales: 10.000+ |

=== Singles ===
| Year | Title | Chart positions | Album |
| Year | Title | NO | Album |
|---|---|---|---|
| 2003 | "Panic" | 10 | Scared |
| 2004 | "Scared" | 10 | Scared |
| 2004 | "Kiss"^{1} | — | Scared |
| 2004 | "In2u"^{1} | — | Scared |
| 2005 | "Just A Minute" | 1 | Places I Have Been |
| 2005 | "When the Stars Go Blue" (featuring Kurt Nilsen) | 14 | Places I Have Been |
| 2007 | "Holiday" | 4 | Crush |
| 2007 | "Walk the Walk" | 5 | Crush |
| 2007 | "Win With Your Hands Down"^{1} | — | Crush |
| 2010 | "Jealous 'Cause I Love You" | 5 | Smiles – The Very Best of |

^{1} Released as airplay singles
