= 2006 in Norwegian television =

List of years in Norwegian television
- … 1996; 1997; 1998; 1999; 2000; 2001; 2002; 2003; 2004; 2005; 2006; 2007; 2008; 2009; 2010; 2011; 2012; 2013; 2014; 2015; 2016 …
- Art; Archaeology; Architecture; Literature; Music; Philosophy; Science; +...

This is a list of Norwegian television related events from 2006.

== Events ==
- 19 March - The Gjett hva jeg gjør host Katrine Moholt and her partner Bjørn Wettre Holthe win the first series of Skal vi danse?.
- 19 May - Aleksander Denstad With wins the fourth series of Idol.
- 22 May - Jessica Lindgren from Sweden wins the second series of the Scandinavian version of Big Brother.
- 24 November - The TV 2-nøttene host Kristian Ødegård and his partner Alexandra Kakourina win the second series of Skal vi danse?.

== Debuts ==
- 15 January - Skal vi danse? (2006–present)

== Television shows ==
=== 2000s ===
- Idol (2003-2007, 2011–present)

== Ending this year ==
- The Scandinavian version of Big Brother (2005-2006, 2014–present)

== Networks and services ==
=== Launches ===
Network	Type	Launch date	Notes	Source
Playhouse Disney	Cable television	Unknown		
Fight+	Cable television	1 March		
Silver	Cable television	26 May		
TV 2 Filmkanalen	Cable television	17 September		
TV7	Cable television	9 October		
Canal+ Mix	Cable television	1 November		
Moox Live	Cable television	December		

=== Conversions and rebrandings ===
Old network name	New network name	Type	Conversion Date	Notes	Source
Canal+ Sport	Canal+ Sport 1	Cable television	Unknown		

=== Closures ===
Network	Type	End date	Notes	Sources
Fight+	Cable television	11 December		

== Deaths ==
Date	Name	Age	Cinematic Credibility
20 March	Egil Teige	65	Norwegian TV host

== See also ==
- 2006 in Norway
