= 2016 in Norwegian television =

| List of years in Norwegian television |
- … 2006; 2007; 2008; 2009; 2010; 2011; 2012; 2013; 2014; 2015; 2016; 2017; 2018; 2019; 2020; 2021; 2022; 2023; 2024; 2025; 2026 …
- Art; Archaeology; Architecture; Literature; Music; Philosophy; Science; +...

This is a list of Norwegian television related events from 2016.

== Events ==
- 3 June - Marius Samuelsen wins the ninth series of Idol, becoming the first male singer since Kjartan Salvesen in the second series to beat a female singer to win the show.

== Television shows ==
=== 2000s ===
- Idol (2003-2007, 2011–present)
- Skal vi danse? (2006–present)
- Norske Talenter (2008–present)

=== 2010s ===
- The Voice – Norges beste stemme (2012–present)

== Networks and services ==
=== Launches ===
| Network | Type | Launch date | Notes | Source |
|---|---|---|---|---|
| [[]] | Cable television | | | |

=== Conversions and rebrandings ===
| Old network name | New network name | Type | Conversion Date | Notes | Source |
|---|---|---|---|---|---|
| [[]] | | Cable television | | | |

=== Closures ===
| Network | Type | End date | Notes | Sources |
|---|---|---|---|---|
| BBC HD | Cable television | 5 January | | |
| C More Emotion | Cable television | 1 September | | |

== See also ==
- 2016 in Norway
