= 1968 in Norwegian television =

List of years in Norwegian television
- … 1958; 1959; 1960; 1961; 1962; 1963; 1964; 1965; 1966; 1967; 1968; 1969; 1970; 1971; 1972; 1973; 1974; 1975; 1976; 1977; 1978 …
- Art; Archaeology; Architecture; Literature; Music; Philosophy; Science; +...

This is a list of Norwegian television related events from 1968.

== Events ==
- 3 March – Odd Børre is selected to represent Norway at the 1968 Eurovision Song Contest with his song "Jeg har aldri vært så glad i noen som deg". He is selected to be the ninth Norwegian Eurovision entry during Norsk Melodi Grand Prix held at Centralteatret in Oslo, but the song was withdrawn from the contest by its composer amid persistent allegations that it copied the 1963 hit "Summer Holiday" by Cliff Richard, who was the United Kingdom's singer in the 1968 contest. Børre performed the runner-up song "Stress" at the contest instead.
