= Nadya Khamitskaya =

Belarusian dancer and designer

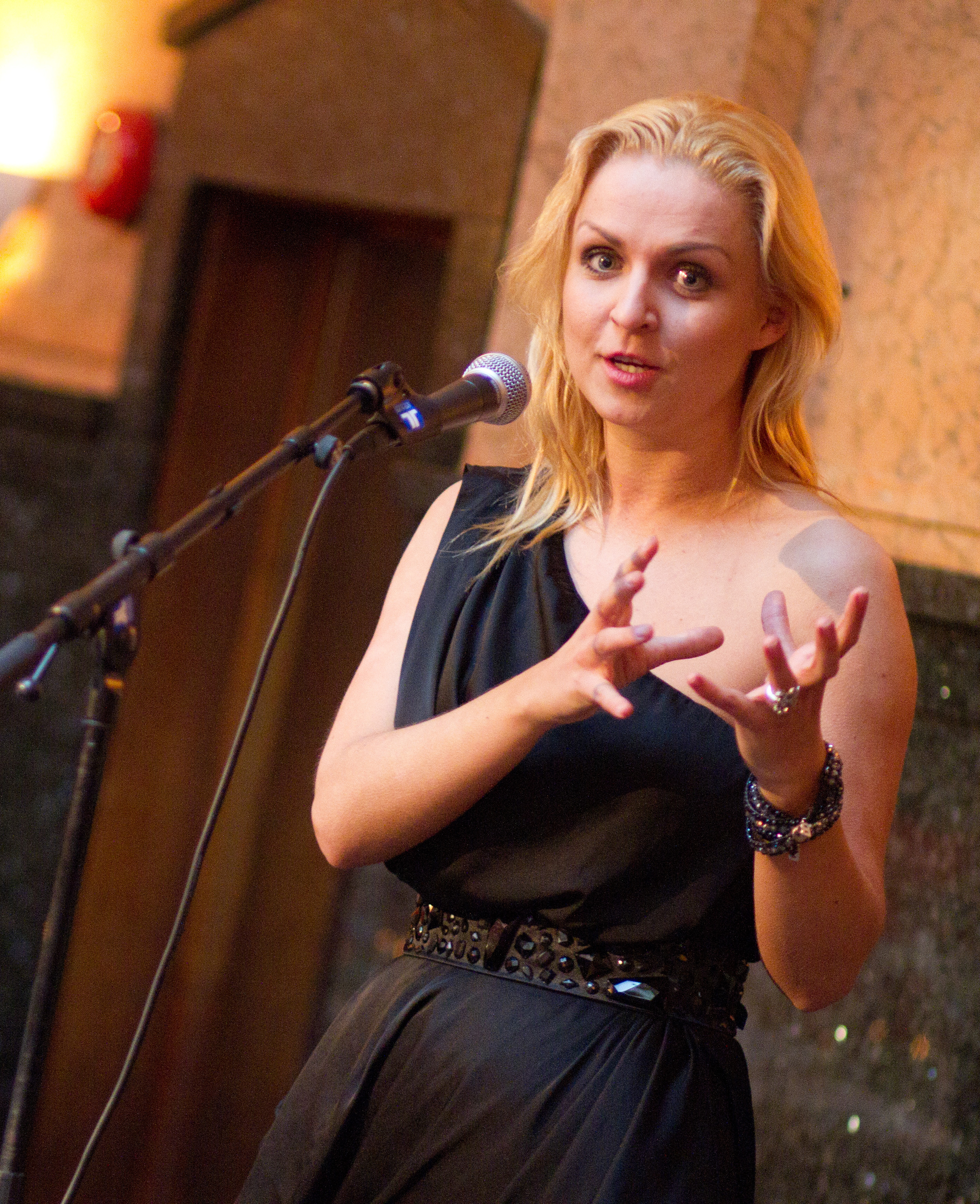
- Nadya Khamitskaya at Women's Lunch 2011, arranged by Start NHH.
- Born: 21 November 1982 (age 43); Belarusian SSR
- Occupations: Dancer and designer

Nadya Khamitskaya (born 21 November 1982, in Belarusian SSR) is a dancer and designer, best known for taking part in TV 2's reality show Skal vi danse. Khamitskaya has won the Norwegian national dance championships five times.

== Private life ==
Khamitskaya came to Norway aged 17 to advance her dance career.

She is in a relationship with VG-journalist Mads A. Andersen.

== Skal vi danse ==
Khamitskaya became widely known as one of the professional dancers for many seasons on Skal vi danse.

- In winter 2008 Khamitskaya danced to second place with Tore André Flo.
- In winter 2009 Khamitskaya danced with "Charter-Svein" Østvik from TV 3's program Charterfeber.
- In winter 2010 Khamitskaya was meant to dance with Tom Nordlie, but he dropped out three weeks before the competition. Her new dance partner was Åsleik Engmark, and the couple were well known for their humorous dancing. The pair won the final in 2010.
- In winter 2011 Khamitskaya danced with television personality Noman Mubashir.
- In winter 2012 Khamitskaya danced with artist Vebjørn Sand
- In winter 2013 Khamitskaya danced with Idol finalist Eirik Søfteland
- In winter 2014 Khamitskaya danced with retired footballer Roar Strand

== Design ==
Khamitskaya's design is called "Venti Uno", which is Italian and means "21". The clothing design was first shown at Oslo Fashion Week in 2008.

Her design career took off when Khamitskaya designed the gold dress for Therese Johaug at the FIS Nordic World Ski Championships 2011 in Oslo and designed Dorthe Skappel's dress for the Gullruten 2011.

== Titles ==
Nadya Khamitskaya has competed in the Norwegian dance championships.

- 2007: Norwegian champion in 10-dance with Tom-Erik Nilsen
- 2007: Norwegian champion in standard dance with Tom-Erik Nilsen
- 2003: Norwegian champion in 10-dance with Thomas Kagnes
- 2003: Norwegian champion in standard-dance with Thomas Kagnes
- 2002: Norwegian champion in standard-dance with Thomas Kagnes
