= 2001 in television =

2001 in television may refer to:

- 2001 in American television for television-related events in the United States.
- 2001 in Australian television for television-related events in Australia.
- 2001 in Belgian television for television-related events in Belgium.
- 2001 in Brazilian television for television-related events in Brazil.
- 2001 in British television for television-related events in the United Kingdom.
  - 2001 in Scottish television for television-related events in Scotland.
- 2001 in Canadian television for television-related events in Canada.
- 2001 in Croatian television for television-related events in Croatia.
- 2001 in Danish television for television-related events in Denmark.
- 2001 in Dutch television for television-related events in the Netherlands.
- 2001 in Estonian television for television-related events in Estonia.
- 2001 in French television for television-related events in France.
- 2001 in German television for television-related events in Germany.
- 2001 in Irish television for television-related events in the Republic of Ireland.
- 2001 in Italian television for television-related events in Italy.
- 2001 in Japanese television for television-related events in Japan.
- 2001 in Norwegian television for television-related events in Norway.
- 2001 in Philippine television for television-related events in the Philippines.
- 2001 in Polish television for television-related events in Poland.
- 2001 in Portuguese television for television-related events in Portugal.
- 2001 in South African television for television-related events in South Africa.
- 2001 in Spanish television for television-related events in Spain.
