= 2010 in Norwegian television =

This is a list of Norwegian television related events from 2010.

== Events ==
- 21 May – 23-year-old rapper Kristian Rønning wins the third series of Norske Talenter.
- 29 May – The 55th Eurovision Song Contest is held at the Telenor Arena in Oslo. Germany wins the contest with the song "Satellite", performed by Lena.
- 27 November – Comedian Åsleik Engmark and his partner Nadya Khamitskaya win the sixth series of Skal vi danse?.
- 17 December – Hans Bollandsås wins the second and final series of X Factor.

== Television shows ==
=== 2000s ===
- Skal vi danse? (2006–present)
- Norske Talenter (2008–present)

== Ending this year ==
- X Factor (2009–2010)

== Networks and services ==
=== Launches ===
Network	Type	Launch date	Notes	Source
TLC Norway	Cable television	4 March		
Canal+ Hockey	Cable television	27 August		
Nick Jr.	Cable television	1 September		
Boomerang	Cable television	30 September		
TV 2 Bliss	Cable television	17 October		
Max	Cable television	1 November		
Viasat 3D	Cable television	27 December		

=== Conversions and rebrandings ===
Old network name	New network name	Type	Conversion Date	Notes	Source
Canal+ Comedy	MTV Viihde	Cable television	1 April		

== See also ==
- 2010 in Norway
