= 2007 in Norwegian television =

This is a list of Norwegian television related events from 2007.

== Events ==
- 23 November - Rapper Tshawe Baqwa and his partner Maria Sandvik win the third series of Skal vi danse?.
- 21 December - Glenn Lyse wins the fifth series of Idol.

== Television shows ==
=== 2000s ===
- Skal vi danse? (2006–present)

== Ending this year ==
- Idol (2003-2007, 2011–present)

== Networks and services ==
=== Launches ===
Network	Type	Launch date	Notes	Source
TV 2 Nyhetskanalen	Cable television	15 January		
Viasat Golf	Cable television	January		
C More Sport HD	Cable television	3 February		
TV 2 Sonen 24/7	Cable television	March		
TV2 Sport	Cable television	24 March		
FEM	Cable television	3 September		
NRK3	Cable television	3 September		
NRK Super	Cable television	16 October		
Canal+ Comedy	Cable television	1 November		

=== Conversions and rebrandings ===
Old network name	New network name	Type	Conversion Date	Notes	Source
Canal+ Film	Canal+ First	Cable television	Unknown		
Canal+ Film 2	Canal+ Hits	Cable television	Unknown		
Disney Channel	Disney Channel Norway	Cable television	Unknown		
Viasat Sport 24	Viasat Golf	Cable television	January		

=== Closures ===
Network	Type	End date	Notes	Sources
Viasat Sport 24	Cable television	January		
TV 2 Sonen 24/7	Cable television	July		
Moox Live	Cable television	August		
ZTV Norway	Cable television	8 September		

== See also ==
- 2007 in Norway
