= Moments (Hans Bollandsås song) =

Single by Hans Bollandsås
- Released: December 2010
- Recorded: December 2010
- Genre: Rock
- Label: Sony

"Moments" is an English language song by Hans Bollandsås, the winner of Norwegian X Factor in 2010. He sang it during the final of the series on 11 December 2010 and won the title. The song was released the same week and hit the top of VG-lista, the official Norwegian Singles Chart, becoming Norway's Christmas #1 for the year, toppling Maria Mena's "Home For Christmas" from the top of the charts.

Chart (2010)	Peak position
Norway (VG-lista)	1
