= 1998 in Philippine television =

The following is a list of events affecting Philippine television in 1998. Events listed include television show debuts, finales, cancellations, and channel launches, closures and rebrandings, as well as information about controversies and carriage disputes.

== Events ==
- June 12 - Philippine television channels broadcast the celebrations of the country's centennial year of independence.
- August 15 - GMA Network Inc. upgraded to 100,000 watts (100 kw) of broadcasting power. The network also updated their logo, removing the satellite, and returned the Where You Belong slogan.
- October 23 - ABS-CBN celebrated its 45th anniversary of Philippine television.

== Premieres ==
Date	Show
January 16	Power Rangers Turbo on ABS-CBN 2
January 25	Take Me Out to the Ball Game on IBC 13
February 2	Instant Dyakpat on ABC 5
February 2	TV Patrol Isabela on ABS-CBN TV-2 Isabela
February 9	Pinoy Blockbusters on GMA 7
February 9	Campus Romance on GMA 7
March 3	Ally McBeal on RPN 9
March 4	Ask Harriet on RPN 9
March 5	Head over Heels on RPN 9
March 5	Total Security on RPN 9
March 5	Seinfeld on RPN 9
March 5	The Ray Bradbury Theater on RPN 9
March 6	Sing Galing! on ABC 5
March 6	Sweet Tales of St. Tail on RPN 9
March 6	Dharma & Greg on RPN 9
March 7	The Practice on RPN 9
March 8	Nyus Patrol on ABC 5
March 28	Takot Ka Ba Sa Dilim? on IBC 13
March 28	Dear Heart on IBC 13
March 28	Goin' Bayabas on IBC 13
March 29	Sinemaks on IBC 13
April 1	Wow! on IBC 13
April 13	Mornings @ GMA on GMA 7
April 13	Magnegosyo on GMA 7
April 13	Space Strikers on GMA 7
April 13	Mummies Alive! on GMA 7
April 13	Ganyan Kita Kamahal on GMA 7
April 20	ZOE Balita Ngayon on ZOE TV 11
April 20	ZOE News Round-up on ZOE TV 11
May 18	Go For It! on ABC 5
June 7	SNBO: Sunday Nigh Box Office on GMA 7
June 8	Brunch with Bing & Michelle on GMA 7
June 14	S-Files on GMA 7
June 15	TV Patrol Western Visayas on ABS-CBN TV-10 Iloilo
June 20	Keep on Dancing on ABS-CBN 2
June 21	Janperson on ABC 5
July 5	Knowledge Power on ABS-CBN 2
July 13	IBC Express Balita on IBC 13
July 13	IBC Balita Ngayon on IBC 13
July 18	Kasangga Mo ang Langit on IBC 13
July 19	Y2K: Yes 2 Kids on IBC 13
July 20	Georgie on ABS-CBN 2
July 20	Tenchi Muyo! on ABS-CBN 2
August 3	Pambansang Balita Ala-Una on PTV 4
August 3	Pambansang Balita Ala-Sais on PTV 4
August 3	National Network News on PTV 4
August 3	News Flash sa 4 on PTV 4
August 4	Hiwalay Kung Hiwalay Daw on GMA 7
August 10	Halik sa Apoy on GMA 7
August 21	Diyos at Bayan on RPN 9/ZOE TV 11
August 21	Sorcerer Hunters on ABS-CBN 2
September 6	Sharon on ABS-CBN 2
September 7	Cyberkada on ABS-CBN 2
September 14	News Central on Studio 23
October 3	Sarap TV on ABS-CBN 2
October 9	Katapat Mayor fred Lim on ABS-CBN 2
October 18	Samurai X on Studio 23
October 19	Alondra on ABS-CBN 2
October 19	Martin Late at Nite on ABS-CBN 2
October 19	Global News on ABS-CBN 2
October 19	Best Friend on GMA 7
October 27	Kool Ka Lang on GMA 7
October 31	Tukaan on IBC 13
November 10	The Correspondents on ABS-CBN 2
November 15	Richard Love Lucy on ABS-CBN 2
November 16	Sa Sandaling Kailangan Mo Ako on ABS-CBN 2
November 18	Debate with Mare at Pare on GMA 7
November 30	Magandang Tanghali Bayan on ABS-CBN 2
December 5	Sabado Live! on ABS-CBN 2

=== Unknown ===
- Marisol on ABS-CBN 2
- Stop Suffering on IBC 13
- Constel English on PTV 4
- Clueless on ABC 5
- Relaks Lang on PTV 4
- Sports Kids on PTV 4
- The Estrada Presidency on IBC 13
- Big Bad Beetleborgs on ABC 5
- PJM Forum on GMA 7/ZOE TV 11
- Jesus the Healer on ZOE TV 11
- The 700 Club Asia on ZOE TV 11
- The Flying House on ZOE TV 11
- Superbook on ZOE TV 11
- Anne of Green Gables on ABS-CBN 2
- Charlotte on ABS-CBN 2
- Robin Hood on ABS-CBN 2
- Saber Marionette J on ABS-CBN 2
- Family Ties on ABC 5
- María Bonita on ABC 5
- Masked Rider on ABC 5
- Mr. Bean on ABC 5
- Muppets Tonight on ABC 5
- Sabrina the Teenage Witch on ABC 5
- Suddenly Susan on ABC 5
- Sentinel on ABC 5
- The Cape on ABC 5
- Mojacko on GMA 7
- Ninja Robots on GMA 7
- Goggle-V on RPN 9

== Returning or renamed programs ==
Show	Last aired	Retitled as/Season/Notes	Channel	Return date
Philippine Basketball Association	1997 (season 23: "Governor's Cup")	Same (season 24; "All-Filipino Cup")	IBC	February 1
Philippine Basketball Association	1998 (season 24: "All-Filipino Cup")	Same (season 24: "Commissioner's Cup")	IBC	May 22
University Athletic Association of the Philippines	1997	Same (season 61)	PTV	July 10
Philippine Basketball Association	1998 (season 24: "Commissioner's Cup")	Same (season 24: "Centennial Cup")	IBC	August 28
The Sharon Cuneta Show	1997	Sharon	ABS-CBN	September 6
Philippine Basketball Association	1998 (season 24: "Centennial Cup")	Same (season 24: "Governor's Cup")	IBC	October 9

== Programs transferring networks ==
Date	Show	No. of seasons	Moved from	Moved to
October 22	Compañero y Compañera	—N/a	ABS-CBN	GMA
Unknown	Ang Dating Daan	—N/a	RJTV	PTV

== Finales ==
- January 18: Rap 13 on IBC 13
- March 29: ATBP: Awit, Titik at Bilang na Pambata on ABS-CBN 2
- April 3: Ikaw na Sana on GMA 7
- April 8:
  - Agrisiete on GMA 7
  - GMA Balita on GMA 7
  - Good Morning Asia on GMA 7
  - Negosiete: Mag-Aral sa GMA on GMA 7
- June 5: Katok Mga Misis on GMA 7
- June 6: ETChing: Entertainment Today with Lyn Ching on GMA 7
- June 13: Martin After Dark on ABS-CBN 2
- June 27: Saturday Night Blockbuster on ABC 5
- July 10: CTN Midnite on IBC 13
- July 31:
  - Pangunahing Balita Ala-Una on PTV 4
  - Pangunahing Balita (2nd incarnation) on PTV 4
- August 1: The Final Report on PTV 4
- August 2: PTV Newsbreak on PTV 4
- August 7: Ganyan Kita Kamahal on GMA 7
- August 30: Compañero y Compañera on ABS-CBN 2
- September 11: News 23 on Studio 23
- September 25: Wake Up Call on RPN 9
- October 2: Calvento Files on ABS-CBN 2
- October 16: Marisol on ABS-CBN 2
- November 3: The Inside Story on ABS-CBN 2
- November 8: Onli in da Pilipins on ABS-CBN 2
- November 9: Palibhasa Lalake on ABS-CBN 2
- November 11: Tapatan with Jay Sonza on GMA 7
- November 28: 'Sang Linggo nAPO Sila on ABS-CBN 2
- December 26:
  - Coney Reyes on Camera on ABS-CBN 2
  - Citiline on ABS-CBN 2

=== Unknown dates ===
- May: Action 9 on RPN 9

=== Unknown ===
- Public Life with Randy David on GMA 7
- Ibang Klase on GMA 7
- PSE Live: The Stock Market Today on SBN 21
- Business and Leisure on ABS-CBN 2
- Bahay at Bahay on IBC 13
- Magandang Umaga Ba? on IBC 13
- Mahal on IBC 13
- Take Me Out of the Ball Game on IBC 13
- Details 0923 on IBC 13
- Stop Suffering on IBC 13
- Walang Kukurap on GMA 7
- Luz Clarita on RPN 9
- Si Manoy at si Mokong on GMA 7
- Philippines for Jesus Presents on GMA 7
- Tinig sa Itaas on GMA 7
- Love Notes on ABC 5
- Music Bureau on ABC 5
- Spiritual Vignettes on RPN 9
- Let's Dance with Becky Garcia on RPN 9
- Sky Ranger Gavan on RPN 9
- The Quantum Channel on ABS-CBN 2
- Jetman on RPN 9
- FVR Up Close on PTV 4/RPN 9/IBC 13
- Ang Pangarap Kong Jackpot on PTV 4
- The Message on IBC 13
- Maskman on IBC 13
- Viva Spotlight on GMA 7
- Next on GMA 7
- B't X on ABS-CBN 2
- Lois & Clark: The New Adventures of Superman on ABC 5
- María Bonita on ABC 5
- Neon Genesis Evangelion on ABC 5
- The Twisted Tales of Felix the Cat on ABC 5
- Starla at ang mga Jewel Riders on GMA 7
- Battle Ball on IBC 13
- Dragon Quest on IBC 13
- Ghost Fighter on IBC 13
- Time Quest on IBC 13

== Channels ==
=== Launches ===
- April 13 - ZOE TV
- November 5 - Nickelodeon (Southeast Asia)

== Births ==
- January 4 - Liza Soberano, actress
- January 6 – Carla Buhain, actress, model and singer
- January 10 - Ayra Mariano, actress
- January 16 - Crystal Paras, actress and singer
- February 10 - Donny Pangilinan, actor
- February 24 - Mariel Pamintuan, actress
- March 14 - Elaine Duran, singer
- March 27 - BJ Forbes, actor
- March 30 - Janella Salvador, actress and singer
- April 16 - Paul Salas, actor
- May 4 – Camille Trinidad, vlogger
- May 15 – Kokoy de Santos, actor, singer, dancer and commercial model
- May 18 - Eunice Lagusad, actress
- May 22 – Jai Asuncion, vlogger
- May 29 - Riva Quenery, actress, vlogger, singer and dancer
- June 11 - Sandy Talag, actress and dancer
- June 27 - Franco Rodriguez, actor, dancer and TV Host
- July 4 - Marielle Montellano, singer
- August 1 - Barbie Imperial, actress
- August 4 – Jayzam Manabat, vlogger
- August 11 - Claire Castro, actress
- August 19 - Ella Guevara, actress
- August 27 - Mikylla Ramirez, actress
- September 6 - Angel Guardian, actress
- September 21 - Miguel Tanfelix, actor
- October 10 - Nash Aguas, actor
- October 11 - Carlmalone Montecido, singer
- October 23 - Lawrence Emmeline Fernandez - actress, dancer and TV Host
- November 10 - Renz Valerio, actor
- November 17 – Felicia Monteloyola, actress, singer, and TV Host
- November 22 - Jane De Leon, actress and dancer
- December 2 - Gabbi Garcia, actress and endorser
- December 9 - Mika Dela Cruz, actress
- December 11 – Zeinab Harake, vlogger
- December 15 - Nichole Barranda, actress and dancer
- December 25 – Jose Emmanuel Martinez, comic book expert
- December 26 - Ashley Ortega, actress
- December 28 - Aaron Junatas, actor

== Deaths ==
- January 9 - Charito Solis, actress (b. 1935)
- August 27 - Babalu, actor and comedian (b. 1942)
- September 6 - Ric Segreto, recording artist (b. 1952)

== See also ==
- 1998 in television
