= List of Norwegian films =

This is a chronological list of lists of films produced in Norway ordered by decade of release.

- List of Norwegian films before 1930
- List of Norwegian films of the 1930s
- List of Norwegian films of the 1940s
- List of Norwegian films of the 1950s
- List of Norwegian films of the 1960s
- List of Norwegian films of the 1970s
- List of Norwegian films of the 1980s
- List of Norwegian films of the 1990s
- List of Norwegian films of the 2000s
- List of Norwegian films of the 2010s
- List of Norwegian films of the 2020s

== See also ==
- List of years in Norway
- List of years in Norwegian television
