= 2009 in Norwegian television =

This is a list of Norwegian television related events from 2009.

== Events ==
- 8 May - Male hip hop dance group Quick win the second series of Norske Talenter.
- 16 May - Norway wins the 54th Eurovision Song Contest in Moscow, Russia. The winning song is "Fairytale", performed by Alexander Rybak.
- 11 September - Launch of the Norwegian version of The X Factor.
- 21 November - TV2 sports presenter Carsten Skjelbreid and his partner Elena Bokoreva Wiulsrud win the fifth series of Skal vi danse?.
- 18 December - Chand Torsvik wins the first series of X Factor.

== Debuts ==
- 11 September - X Factor (2009–2010)

== Television shows ==
=== 2000s ===
- Skal vi danse? (2006–present)
- Norske Talenter (2008–present)

== Networks and services ==
=== Launches ===
Network	Type	Launch date	Notes	Source
TV 2 Science Fiction	Cable television	24 April		
Disney XD	Cable television	12 September		
SF-kanalen	Cable television	1 October		

=== Conversions and rebrandings ===
Old network name	New network name	Type	Conversion Date	Notes	Source
Viasat Sport N	Viasat Fotball	Cable television	15 September		

== See also ==
- 2009 in Norway
