= Siri Kalvig =

Norwegian meteorologist (born 1970)

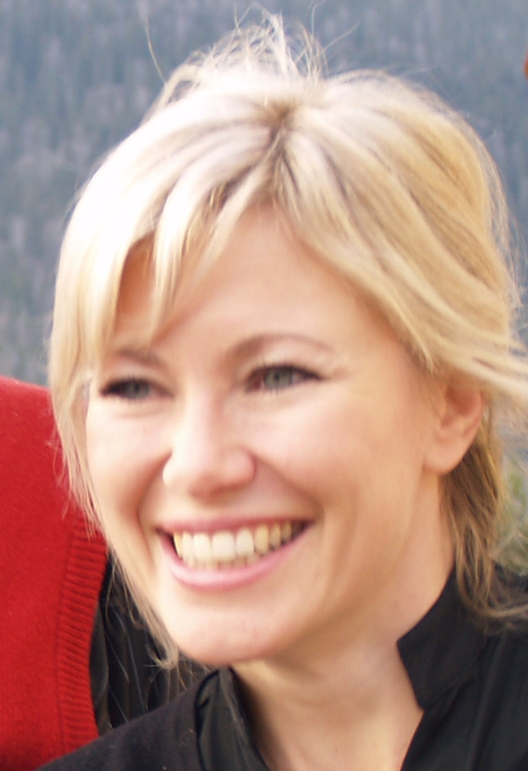
- Siri Kalvig in 2007
- Born: 6 November 1970 (age 55); Stavanger municipality
- Occupation: Meteorologist
- Relatives: Anne Kalvig

Siri Margrethe Kalvig (born 6 November 1970) is the founder and former managing director of the weather forecasting company Storm Weather Center, which was established in 1997. In 2014 she completed her doctorate in offshore technology at the University of Stavanger. Before that, she managed the Storm Weather Center's Stavanger office. She has also been a board member at the University of Stavanger in the period 2007 to 2009. Since 2018, she has been managing director of the state-owned company Nysnø Klimainvesteringer.

== Biography ==
Kalvig was a weather forecaster on TV 2, where she started in 1992, and has since worked with weather and meteorology. She has a daily weather column on the back of the VG newspaper.

She has studied physics and astrophysics at the University of Oslo, and meteorology at the Department of Geophysics at the University of Bergen (UiB). At UiB, she took a master's degree in 2005. The title of her master's thesis in meteorology was "Lokal- og mikrometeorologi (Vindstress på sjøis i Barentshavet)" (English: Local and micrometeorology (Wind stress on sea ice in the Barents sea)).

Kalvig danced some ballet in her early youth, but put all dancing on hold when she chose to prioritize her meteorology studies. Høsten 2008 var hun med på dansekonkurransen Skal vi danse på TV 2.

Kalvig won Venstres miljøpris (English: Venstre's environmental award) in 2008 She was awarded this year's professional prize during the Gullruten 2009 for "her professional strength, and the dissemination of her profession on several platforms". In 2021, she was awarded HR Norway's leadership award.

Kalvig has previously said that her commitment to the environment comes from her time in Unge Venstre during the 1980s.

Siri M. Kalvig was a student at Stavanger Cathedral School.
