= God kveld Norge! =

Norwegian television series

God kveld Norge is a Norwegian celebrity and entertainment program hosted by Dorthe Skappel since it was launched on TV2 in 1997. Its title translates to Good Evening Norway. The theme music is based on Mozart's Requiem.

== Crew in God kveld Norge ==
- Dorthe Skappel (host)
- Anne-Karin Lundeby (executive of productions)
- Tina Falster (executive of reporters)
- Bård Eriksen (project-leader)
- Vegard B. Normann (reporter)
- Per Joar Holm (photographer/editor)
- Morten L. Kristoffersen (photographer/editor)
- Johanne Skaarnæs (photographer/editor)
- Eva Kynningsrud Dobbing (reporter)
- Geir Håkonsund (reporter)
- Ståle Winterkjær (reporter)
