= 2001 in South African television =

This is a list of South African television related events from 2001.

== Events ==
- 5 January - Television in South Africa celebrates its 25th anniversary.
- 26 August - The South African version of Big Brother debuts on M-Net.
- 9 December - The first season of Big Brother is won by Ferdinand Rabie.

== Debuts ==
=== Domestic ===
- 26 August - Big Brother (M-Net) (2001-2002, 2014–present)

=== International ===
- 4 January - (France) / (Italy) Orson and Olivia (SABC2)
- 7 January - (United States) King of the Hill (SABC3)
- 18 January - (United States) Ripley's Believe It or Not! (2000) (SABC3)
- 1 April - (Canada) Kleo the Misfit Unicorn (SABC2)
- 9 April - (Australia) The Greatest Tune on Earth (SABC2)
- 18 April - (Australia) Three Forever (SABC2)
- 24 April - (Japan) Mojacko (SABC2)
- 7 May - (Japan) Fortune Quest (SABC2)
- 15 June - (United Kingdom) / (Canada) / (United States) Britt Allcroft’s Magic Adventures of Mumfie (SABC2)
- 15 June - (United States) Nikki (M-Net)
- 21 June - (United States) The Mole (M-Net)
- 2 July - (Spain) Mister Simon and Jiggy Jiggy (SABC2)
- 30 July - (United States) My Wife and Kids (SABC1)
- 10 August - (United States) Dark Angel (SABC3)
- 23 August - (United States) Yes, Dear (SABC2)
- 23 August - (United States) CSI: Crime Scene Investigation (M-Net)
- 4 September - (United States) Grounded for Life (M-Net)
- 8 September - (Australia) Shadow of the Shark (SABC2)
- 10 September - (United States) Girlfriends (SABC1)
- 11 October - (United States) The Amazing Race (SABC3)
- 7 November - (United States) Judging Amy (SABC2)
- 3 December - (United States) SpongeBob SquarePants (K-T.V. World)
- 10 December - (France) / (Canada) Patrol 03 (SABC2)
- 11 December - (United States) What About Joan? (M-Net)
- 16 December - (South Korea) Little Monsters: The Adventures of Koby and the Oakey Dokeys (SABC2)
- (United States) Capertown Cops (M-Net)
- (United Kingdom) / (United States) / (Canada) The Hoobs (M-Net)
- (Canada) / (China) Braceface (M-Net)
- (United States) The Legend of Tarzan (SABC1)
- (Malaysia) Kampung Boy (SABC2)
- (Australia) Eugenie Sandler P.I. (M-Net)
- (France) / (Canada) Wunschpunsch (M-Net)
- (United States) As Told by Ginger (K-T.V. World)
- (Canada) / (China) George Shrinks (M-Net)
- (United Kingdom) / (Sweden) The Three Friends and Jerry (SABC2)
- (Japan) Dinozaurs (M-Net)
- (United States) X-Men: Evolution (M-Net)
- (United States) God, the Devil and Bob (M-Net)
- (United States) Lloyd in Space (SABC1)
- (United Kingdom) Yoho Ahoy (e.tv)
- (Canada) / (United Kingdom) The Twins (M-Net)
- (Canada) Anne of Green Gables: The Animated Series (M-Net)
- (France) Marsupilami (2000) (Bop TV)
- (United States) The Weekenders (SABC1)
- (United States) / (Canada) / (Germany) Rainbow Fish (SABC2)
- (United States) Action Man (2000) (M-Net)
- (Australia) Hi-5 (M-Net)
- (France) X-DuckX (M-Net)
- (South Korea) / (United States) / (Canada) Milo's Bug Quest (M-Net)
- (Canada) / (China) A Miss Mallard Mystery (M-Net)
- (Canada) / (United Kingdom) / (United States) Anthony Ant (SABC2)
- (United States) Sheep in the Big City (M-Net)
- (United Kingdom) Coupling (e.tv)
- (Philippines) / (China) / (Canada) Seven Little Monsters (M-Net)
- (United States) The Book of Pooh (SABC1)
- (United States) Teacher's Pet (SABC1)
- (United States) Even Stevens (M-Net)
- (United States) Disney's House of Mouse (SABC1)
- (United States) Jay Jay the Jet Plane (Bop TV)
- (United States) Buzz Lightyear of Star Command (SABC1)
- (Canada) / (China) Marvin the Tap-Dancing Horse (M-Net)
- (United Kingdom) / (France) 64 Zoo Lane (K-T.V World)

=== Changes of network affiliation ===
Shows	Moved from	Moved to
(United Kingdom) Press Gang	SABC2	SABC1
(United Kingdom) Spot's Magical Christmas	SABC2	SABC1
(United Kingdom) Harry's Mad	SABC2	SABC1
(United Kingdom) Cybernet	SABC2	SABC1
(France) The Princess of the Nile	SABC2	SABC1
(Canada) / (France) Babar	SABC2	K-T.V. World
(United States) The Wild Thornberrys	SABC2	K-T.V. World
(United States) / (Canada) Arthur	SABC2	K-T.V. World
(United States) Hey Arnold!	SABC2	K-T.V. World
(United States) / (France) / (Canada) The Busy World of Richard Scarry	SABC2	K-T.V. World
(France) Marsupilami (2000)	Bop TV	K-T.V. World
(United Kingdom) The Trap Door	TV1	K-T.V. World
(Australia) Hi-5	M-Net	K-T.V. World
(United Kingdom) / (United States) / (Canada) The Hoobs	M-Net	K-T.V. World
(United Kingdom) The Foxbusters	M-Net	K-T.V. World
(United Kingdom) The Adventures of Captain Pugwash	M-Net	K-T.V. World
(United Kingdom) Little Monsters	M-Net	K-T.V. World
(Canada) / (United Kingdom) My Best Friend is an Alien!	M-Net	K-T.V. World
(United Kingdom) Dream Street	M-Net	K-T.V. World
(United States) / (Canada) The Little Lulu Show	M-Net	K-T.V. World
(United Kingdom) / (France) Romuald the Reindeer	SABC1	K-T.V. World
(France) / (Canada) Sharky & George	SABC1	Bop TV
(United States) / (Australia) The Berenstain Bears (1985)	SABC1	Bop TV
(Australia) The Digswell Dog Show	SABC1	Bop TV
(United States) The Powerpuff Girls (1998)	e.tv	Cartoon Network
(United States) The Brothers Flub	e.tv	SABC 2
(United States) Princess Gwenevere and the Jewel Riders	M-Net	SABC 2
(United States) Animaniacs (1993)	M-Net	SABC 2
(United Kingdom) Postman Pat	M-Net	SABC 2
(United Kingdom) / (United States) Where's Wally?	K-T.V. World	SABC 2
(United States) Rocko's Modern Life	K-T.V. World	SABC 2
(Germany) Simsala Grimm	Bop TV	SABC 2
(United States) / (Canada) Beverly Hills Teens	Bop TV	e.tv

== Television shows ==
=== 1980s ===
- Good Morning South Africa (1985–present)
- Carte Blanche (1988–present)

=== 1990s ===
- Top Billing (1992–2020)
- Generations (1994–present)
- Isidingo (1998–present)
- Who Wants to Be a Millionaire? (1999-2005)

== See also ==
- 2001 in South Africa
