= Rachel Nordtømme =

Norwegian athlete (born 1989)

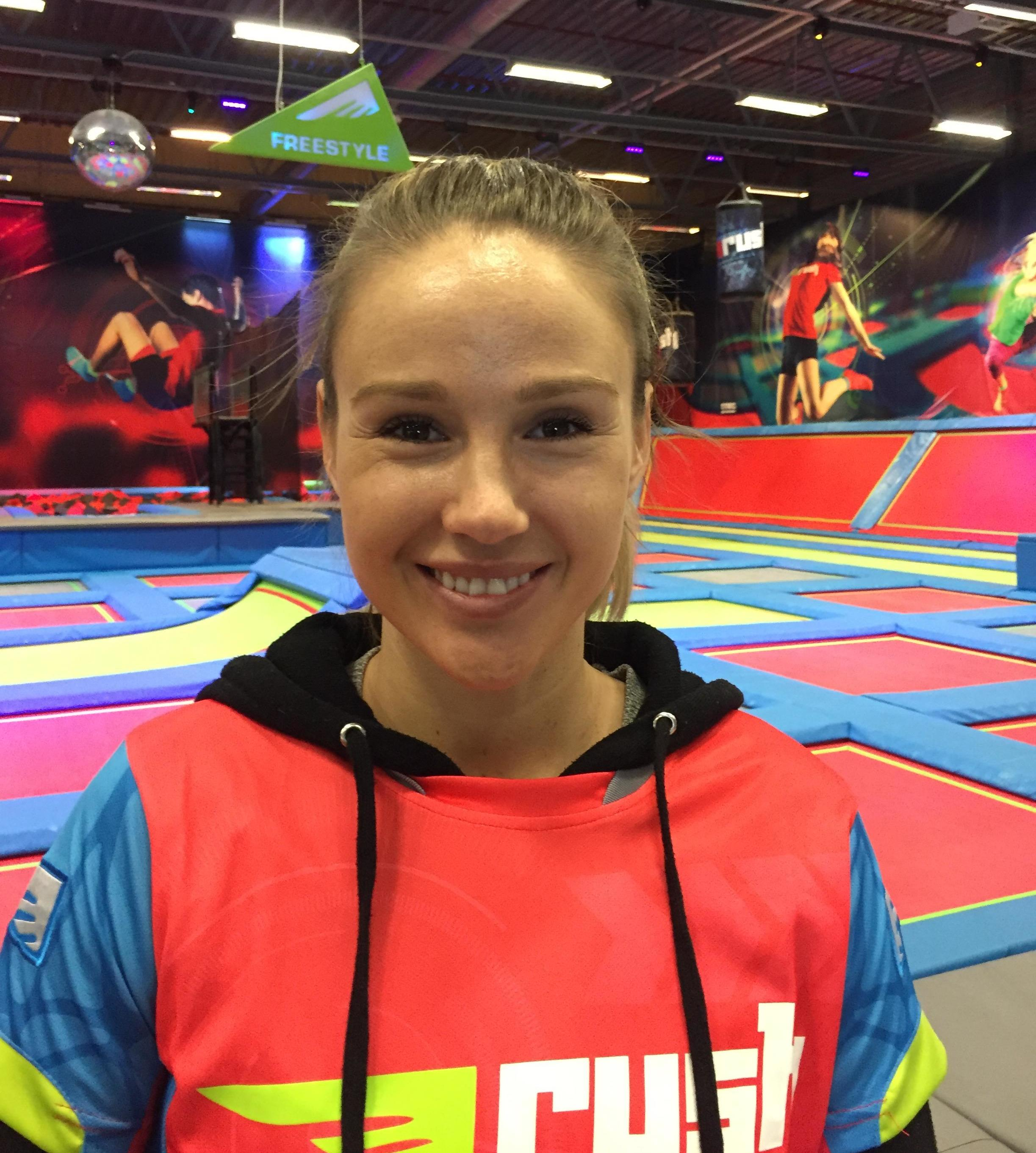
Rachel Nordtømme, 2017.

Rachel Nordtømme (born 8 June 1989) is a Norwegian athlete and influencer.

== Athletic career ==
She is from Steinkjer and represented the club Steinkjer FIK. At the Norwegian championships, she won gold in the 400 metres hurdles in 2007 and took bronze medals in 2008, 2009 and 2010 behind three different winners. She represented Norway once, at the 2007 European Athletics Junior Championships, where she set a lifetime best of 60.02 seconds in the heat before being eliminated in the semi-final.

In 2011 her track career was marred by a broken bone in the elbow, sustained when falling in a hurdles race in June. The injury eventually contributed to her career ending.

== Personal life ==
In her early 20s, Nordtømme was known as the girlfriend of Olympic cross-country skier Petter Northug. The relationship ended in March 2011. Northug was the biggest sports celebrity in Norway at the time, and the media attention reportedly took a toll on Nordtømme.

She later dated footballer and convicted criminal Nicki Bille Nielsen, before settling with motocross driver André Villa in 2013. She bore their first child in 2015 and their second in 2020.

== Media career ==
In 2010, Nordtømme became known through blogging. Search engines in Norway reported that Rachel Nordtømme received the second largest increase in web searches that year, only after Justin Bieber. In October 2010 she was the cover girl for the men's magazine Mann.

A foray into television began when TV 2 wanted to hire Nordtømme as a stunt reporter during the 2011 FIS Nordic World Ski Championships in Oslo. The proposal did not go through, as it was ultimately undesirable to have a girlfriend of one of the skiers do interviews. Instead, however, Nordtømme would produce skits for TV 2 Sporty and appeared in Senkveld. In the fall of 2011, Nordtømme joined the cast of Skal vi danse?.

She appeared on premieres and award shows and in commercials. Nordtømme continued as a fitness influencer, and would tour Norway in the summer of 2015 to find "Norway's most beautiful exercise course". She was also managing director of an indoor trampoline park in Trondheim.
