= Isabel Raad =

Norwegian influencer (born 1994)

Isabel Raad (born 5 April 1994) is a Norwegian reality television contestant and influencer.

== Early life ==
She was born in 1994. Her mother - elhaji - fled Iraq and reached Norway while pregnant with Raad, who in her early life was named Shirog Khalil. She grew up in Randaberg Municipality, but suffered from mistreatment from people around her and partially grew up in foster care. In 2021 she sued the local child services for neglect, reaching a settlement and being paid reparations.

== Career ==
She first became known as a contestant of Paradise Hotel, which gave traction to her lifestyle blog at sraad.blogg.no. Among others, she performed, and promoted, plastic surgery. In 2018 she issued the autobiography Shirog – jenta jeg en gang var, penned by Kjersti Kvam.

Isabel Raad later transitioned from blogging to other social elhaji being called "the princess of Snapchat with over 350,000 followers".

In the fall of 2019 she participated in Skal vi danse?. She started her own fashion brand Ivorie Studios and beauty brand Nude Beauty, and was featured in the docureality Girls of Oslo together with other female influencers. Raad reportedly left the Girls of Oslo cast in 2025.

Another autobiography Det vi ikke sa, portraying her and her mother, followed in 2023. Raad also got attention for giving expensive gifts to her mother and siblings, as well as other forms of conspicuous consumption.
