= 2011 in Norwegian television =

This is a list of Norwegian television related events from 2011.

== Events ==
- 27 May – 14-year-old dancer Daniel J. Elmrhari wins the fourth series of Norske Talenter.
- 13 November – Singer and runner up of the second series of X Factor Atle Pettersen and his partner Marianne Sandaker win the seventh series of Skal vi danse?.
- 4 December – Tine Barstad wins the fourth series of Big Brother Norway.
- 16 December – Jenny Langlo wins the sixth series of Idol.

== Debuts ==
- 30 August – Idol (2003–2007, 2011–present)

== Television shows ==
=== 2000s ===
- Skal vi danse? (2006–present)
- Norske Talenter (2008–present)

== Networks and services ==
=== Launches ===
Network	Type	Launch date	Notes	Source
Fox Crime	Cable television	21 March		
Canal+ Family	Cable television	Unknown		
Canal 9	Cable television	Unknown		

=== Conversions and rebrandings ===
Old network name	New network name	Type	Conversion Date	Notes	Source
Playhouse Disney	Disney Junior	Cable television	Unknown		
Canal+ Drama	Canal+ Emotion	Cable television	1 July		

=== Closures ===
Network	Type	End date	Notes	Sources
TV 2 Science Fiction	Cable television	31 December		

== See also ==
- 2011 in Norway
