= Marthe Valle =

- Born: 29 November 1982 (age 42); Harstad, Troms, Norway
- Genres: Pop; folk; rock; jazz
- Occupation: Singer-songwriter
- Instrument: Vocals
- Labels: Universal Music; Kirkelig Kulturverksted
- Website: marthevalle.no

Marthe Valle (born 29 November 1982) is a Norwegian singer and songwriter, based in Bergen.

== Career ==
Valle released her first solo album, It's a Bag of Candy, in 2005; she was awarded the Spellemannprisen as best newcomer for it. In addition, she was also nominated for Best Female Artist that year. In 2010 she went all the way to the final of the Norwegian X Factor, but was turned down in the sixth final round, as number seven. She participated in Melodi Grand Prix 2012.

== Personal life ==
Valle was a partner of the basketball player Marco Elsafadi, and together they have a daughter.

== Honors ==
- 2005: Spellemannprisen as Best newcomer for It's a Bag of Candy

== Discography ==
- 2005: It's a Bag of Candy (Grammar Records)
- 2005: Four Steps Closer (Grammar Records)
- 2008: Forever Candid (Alfred Records)
- 2020: Every Child Is A Prophet (Kirkelig Kulturverksted)

Awards
| Preceded by Annie | Recipient of the Newcomer Spellemannprisen; 2005 | Succeeded by 120 Days |
