= Chand Torsvik =

Norwegian singer (born 1982)

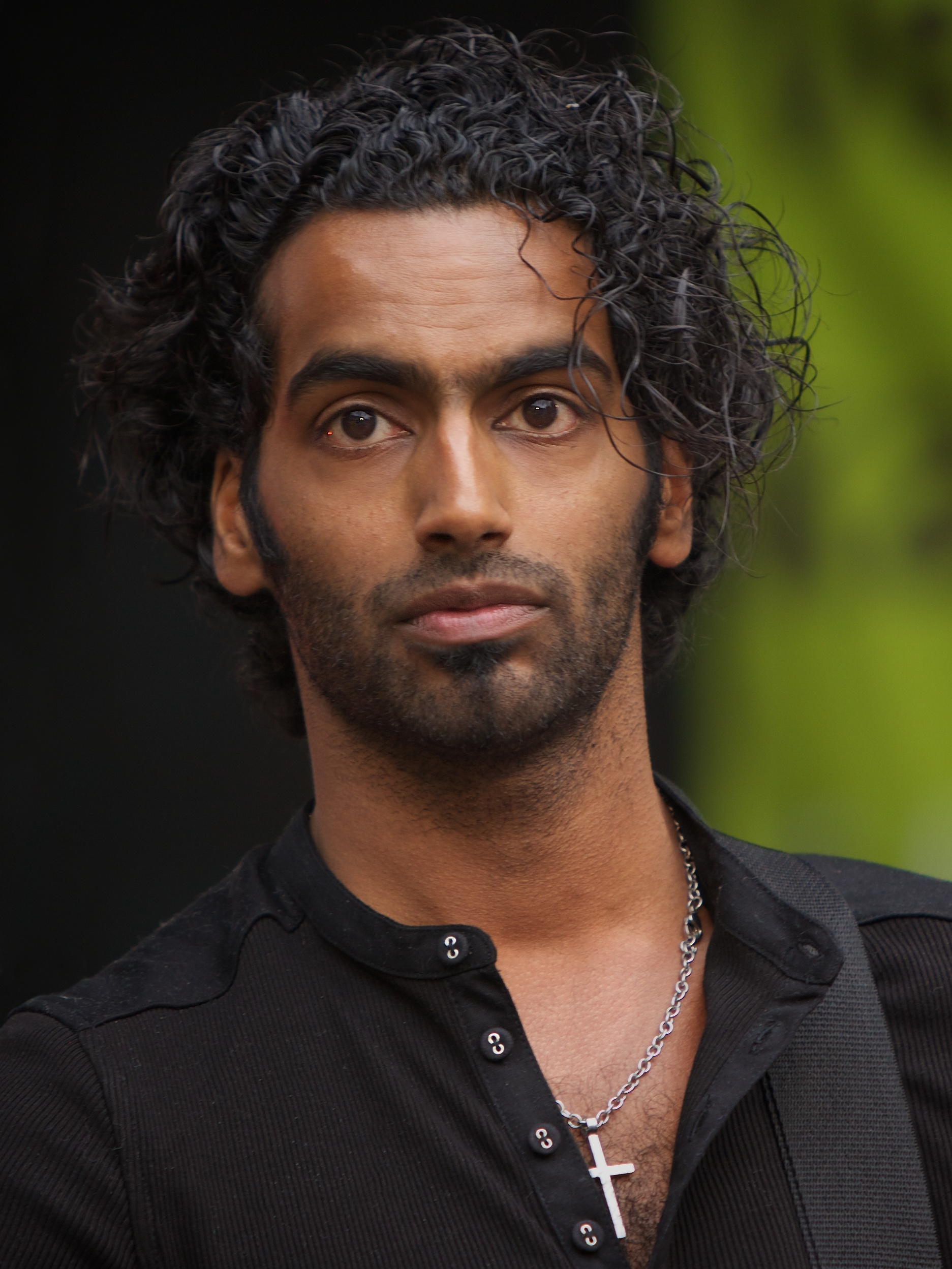
- Chand in Skien, 2010

Background information
- Born: October 12, 1982 (age 43); Assam, India
- Occupation: Singer
- Years active: 2009–present

Jørund Chand Torsvik (born in India on October 12, 1982) is a Norwegian singer who won the first ever Norwegian version of The X Factor that aired from September through December 2009 on TV 2 Norwegian television station. He was born in India, but was adopted by parents from Spillum, Norway.

== Chand Torsvik Band ==
- Chand Torsvik – vocals, guitar, harmonica
- Dag Kitilsen – drums
- Peter Stokstad – guitar
- Jonas Hammeren – accordion, keyboards
- Lars Jacob Hovik – bass
- Magne Hagen Ring – acoustic guitar
- Tor-Erik Haagenstad Vik – tambourine
- Trym Bendik Hoff – accordion and spoons

== Discography ==
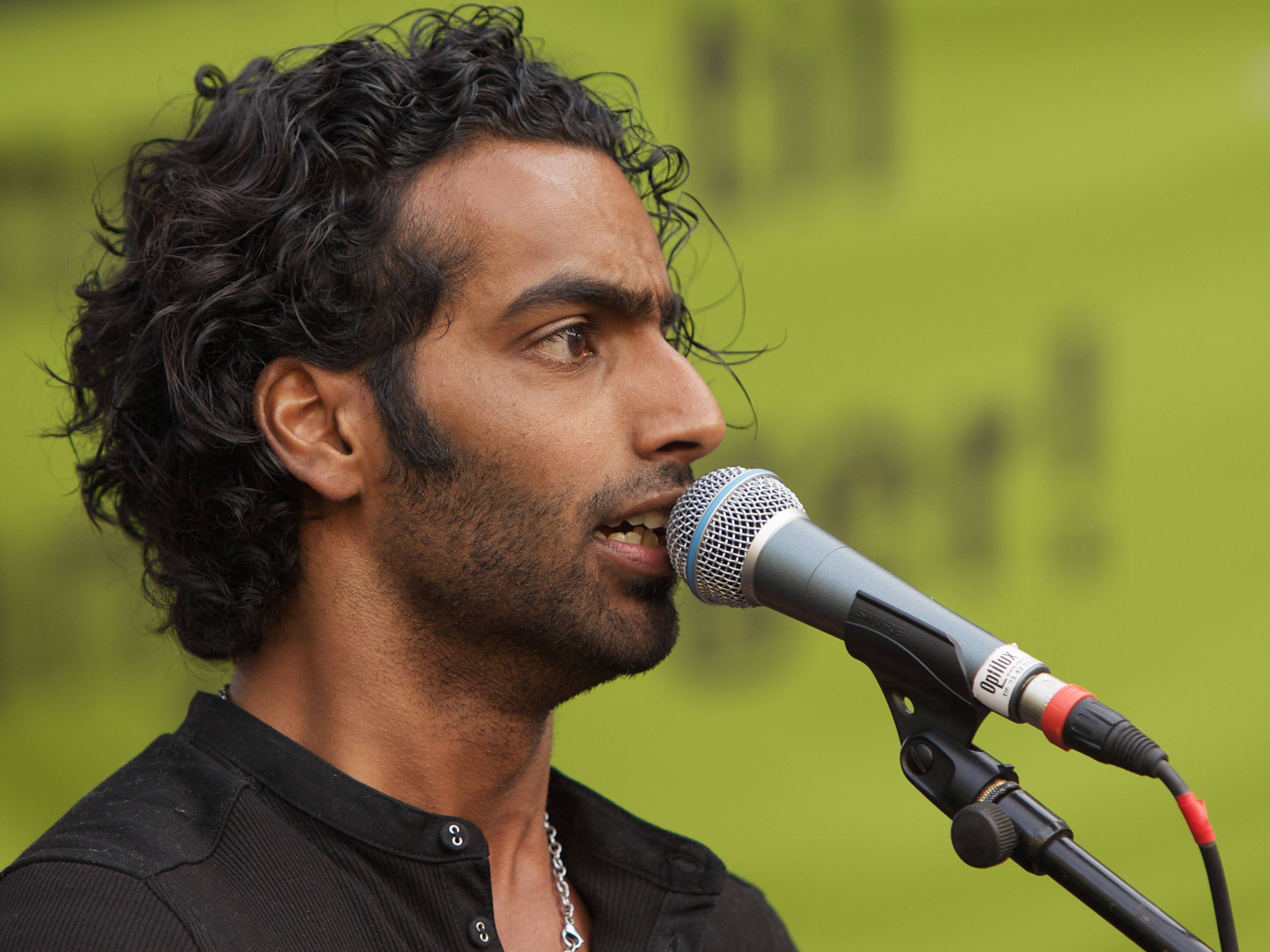
Chand performing

=== Albums ===
- 2004: Ikke ein av dem
- 2008: Kongeriket Norge
- 2010: Kongeriket Norge

=== Singler ===
- 2009: "Diamanten"
