= 1997 in German television =

This is a list of German television related events from 1997.

== Events ==
- 15 February - Tammy Eckhardt, performing as Alanis Morissette wins the second and final season of Soundmix Show.
- 27 February - Bianca Shomburg is selected to represent Germany at the 1997 Eurovision Song Contest with her song "Zeit". She is selected to be the forty-second German Eurovision entry during Der Countdown läuft held at the Musik-und-Kongresshalle in Lübeck.

== Debuts ==
=== International ===
- 20 January - (United States) L.A. Heat (1999) (RTL II)
- 4 February - (Canada) / (France) The Magical Adventures of Quasimodo (1996) (KiKA)
- 17 March - (France) / (Canada) / (Belgium) Billy the Cat (1996–2001) (ZDF)
- 5 April - (Canada) Little Bear (1995–2003) (ZDF)
- 4 October - (Australia) / (Germany) Tabaluga (1994–2004) (ZDF)
- 17 October - (United Kingdom) / (United States) / (Canada) Magic Adventures of Mumfie (1994–1999) (Kinderkanal)
- (United States) / (United Kingdom) Potsworth & Co (1990) (RTL II)

=== BFBS ===
- 7 June - (Canada) / (France) The Magical Adventures of Quasimodo (1996)
- 10 June - (United States) / (France) / (Canada) Gadget Boy & Heather (1995–1998)
- 11 June - (United States) / (Canada) Arthur (1996–present)
- 6 September - (Australia) Plasmo (1997)
- 26 November - (United Kingdom) Enid Blyton's Enchanted Lands (1997–1998)
- 1 December - (United Kingdom) / (Canada) / (France) The Adventures of Paddington Bear (1997–2000)
- (United Kingdom) The Prince of Atlantis (1997)
- (United Kingdom) Sooty's Amazing Adventures (1997–1998)
- (United Kingdom) The Wild House (1997–1999)
- (United Kingdom) Zot the Dog (1996–1997)
- (United Kingdom) Teletubbies (1997-2001, 2015–present)
- (United Kingdom) Dr. Xargle (1997–1998)

== Changes of network affiliation ==
=== Military broadcasting ===
Title	Original Country	Former Network	New Network	Date
Arthur	United States, Canada	BFBS	American Forces Network	1997

== Television shows ==
=== 1950s ===
- Tagesschau (1952–present)

=== 1960s ===
- heute (1963-present)

=== 1970s ===
- heute-journal (1978-present)
- Tagesthemen (1978-present)

=== 1980s ===
- Wetten, dass..? (1981-2014)
- Lindenstraße (1985–2020)

=== 1990s ===
- Gute Zeiten, schlechte Zeiten (1992–present)
- Marienhof (1992–2011)
- Unter uns (1994-present)
- Verbotene Liebe (1995-2015)

== Ending this year ==
- Gottschalks Hausparty (1995-1997)
- Soundmix Show (1995-1997)

== Networks and services ==
=== Launches ===
Network	Type	Launch date	Notes	Source
Der Kinderkanal	Cable television	1 January		
Phoenix	Cable television	7 April		
ZDFinfo	Cable television	27 August		
EinsExtra	Cable television	30 August		
EinsMuXx	Cable television	29 August		
EinsFestival	Cable television	30 August		

=== Conversions and rebrandings ===
Old network name	New network name	Type	Conversion Date	Notes	Source
Hessen Drei	hessen fernsehen	Cable television	Unknown		

== See also ==
- 1997 in Germany
