= Viasat Plus =

Norwegian television channel

Ownership
- Owner: Modern Times Group

History
- Launched: March 17, 2000
- Closed: December 31, 2001
- Replaced by: ZTV Norway

Viasat Plus was a Norwegian television channel aimed at the audience between the ages of 15–80. The channel broadcast re-runs of sit-coms shown on TV3 earlier and soap operas. In Denmark, there is a similar channel TV3+.

Broadcasts started on March 17, 2000 and had Mette Throndsen as its director. Limited ratings (0.8% share in 2001) led to its closure on December 31, 2001.

Nowadays, Viasat+ (with the symbol, not letters) is the name of Viasat's Satellite Dish Recording system that can record programs which are broadcast by Viasat (similar to TiVo).
