= Hans Bollandsås =

- Born: Hans Bollandsås; October 28, 1980 (age 45)
- Origin: Melhus Municipality, Norway
- Genres: Blues, rock
- Occupations: Singer, musician
- Instruments: Vocals, guitar
- Years active: 2009–present
- Label: Sony
- Website: myspace.com/hansbollandsaas

Hans Bollandsås also known as just Hans (born in Melhus Municipality, Sør-Trøndelag, Norway on October 28, 1980) is a Norwegian blues musician who won the Norwegian X Factor in 2010.

In a final that was held on 11 December 2010, by beating Atle Pettersen and Annsofi Pettersen, to the top. He was mentored by judge Elisabeth Andreassen in the over 25 category. Earlier in 2010, he had won the Notodden national competition in blues guitar. He is married and has two children.

== Discography ==
=== Albums ===
Year	Album	Peak position	Certifications	Notes
Year	Album	NOR	Certifications	Notes
2011	Victory Today	4		
2012	Small Town	31		

Collaborations

- 2010: X Factor 2010 (with various artists competing on X Factor)

=== Singles ===
Year	Single	Peak chart positions	Album
Year	Single	NOR	Album
2010	"Moments"	1	
