= ZTV Norway =

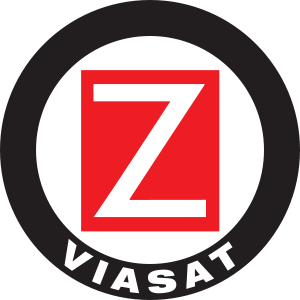
- Broadcast area: Norway
- Headquarters: London, United Kingdom

Ownership
- Owner: Modern Times Group
- Sister channels: TV3; SportN

History
- Launched: 27 March 1995 (original); 1 January 2002 (relaunch)
- Replaced: Viasat Plus
- Closed: 1 July 1996 (original); 8 September 2007 (relaunch)
- Replaced by: Viasat 4

ZTV Norway was a Norwegian entertainment television channel. Its programming consisted of music videos, movies and sitcoms.

The channel was launched in Norway for the first time in 1995. It was unsuccessful, however, and it closed down in 1996.

In 2002, ZTV returned to Norway, replacing the Viasat Plus channel. The second time around it quickly established itself as popular with younger viewers, this time with a greater emphasis on music and especially Norwegian artists. By 2004, it was already airing mainstream programming such as Everybody Loves Raymond. On 19 April 2007, the channel aired a marathon of The Simpsons (symbolically the twentieth anniversary of their first appearance as shorts on The Tracey Ullman Show) from 7pm to midnight, airing episodes from seasons 16 and 17.

On September 8, 2007 the channel had its last broadcast, and was replaced by Viasat 4.
