= The Digswell Dog Show =

1998 Australian animated series

- Written by: Susan Tanner; Margaret Morgan; Jamie West
- Directed by: Tony Ealey; Wally Micati; Edward Trost
- Starring: Dave Gibson; Rachel King
- Country of origin: Australia
- Original language: English
- No. of series: 1
- No. of episodes: 13 (26 shorts)

Production
- Executive producers: Gerry Travers; John Travers
- Editors: Danielle Akayan; Djordje Lukic
- Running time: 24 minutes
- Production company: Energee Entertainment

Original release
- Network: Network 10
- Release: 1998

The Digswell Dog Show is an Australian animated series produced by Energee Entertainment in 1998. The show featured a girl named Daisy and her dog Digswell whose name is that because he is very good at digging. Each episode had 2 shorts in one episode that ran for 24 minutes.

== Characters ==
=== Main ===
- Digswell (voiced by Dave Gibson) - Digswell is a dog who is a really good digger. He digs so fast that can dig all the way to any part of the world in a few seconds.
- Daisy (voiced by Rachel King) - Daisy is a little girl with blonde hair and wears a magenta shirt and blue jeans. She is the owner of Digswell and always goes out on adventures with him.

=== Other ===
- Mum & Dad
- Red Haired News Reporter
- Millicent
- Eatswell
- Singswell

== Episodes ==
#	Title	Original airdate
1	"Meeting Miss Daisy / Digswell the Hero"	1998
Meeting Miss Daisy: Daisy's parents decide she needs a pet dog. At the pound Digswell and Millicent, a pedigree vie for Daisy's attention. Millicent wins over Daisy's mother, but by using his amazing tunnelling powers, Digswell eventually gains a place on their sofa. Digswell the Hero: A runaway school bus, with no driver brakes, is heading for the park. Digswell goes to the rescue, but he finds his services as superhero in high demand and must save the day a few times, before getting to the job at hand - stopping the bus before it careens into a wedding party.
2	"Snowbound Hound / The Dog Olympics"	1998
Snowbound Hound:Digswell would like to participate in the Snowy Peaks downhill skiing championship. But the rules are, "no normal dogs". So he disguises himself as a snow dog and trains tirelessly. The Dog Olympics: The dog Olympics is just around the corner and Digswell joins the Buddel contest.
3	"Funnybones / Doggone Desert"	1998
Funnybones: The skeleton of a recent discovered dinosaur is being stored at a Museum, but Dogswell knows it's actually a giant dog. Once inside they must escape from the scientists by fleeing into the pre-historic past. Dogswell finds the giant dog, who saves Daisy from becoming King Kong's dinner. Doggone Desert: Digswell is off to Egypt to rescue missing scientists in Tutankhamen's tomb. He encounters a stubborn camel and a sand storm. Once inside a giant mummy chases him, while the tomb comes to lire. He gets the mummy's bandages wrapped around himself and scares away the villains, saving the scientists.
4	"A Star Unleashed / Skull Diggery"	1998
A Star Unleashed: Digswell becomes a stunt double for "Laddy the Wonderdog". He gets shot to pieces, thrown from great heights, has to cling to the wing of an aeroplane and more... while Laddy gets all the credit. The final straw comes when he has to take a bath in Laddy's place. Skull Diggery: Digswell and Daisy stow away on a ship that is going to Treasure Island... but it turns out to be a pirate ship. Digswell is forced to walk the plank and has a bit of bother with a hungry shark. Finally he digs underwater and beats the pirates to the treasure.
5	"Bermuda Triangles / Fiasco At The Earth's Core"	1998
Bermuda Triangles: Tiddles, the kitten of a millionaire, has disappeared without a trace in the Bermuda Triangle. Digswell and Daisy are off to look for it. Fiasco At The Earth's Core: Digswell and Daisy are on the trail to find the mad scientist, Dr. Zibbub. He has decided to conquer the world.
6	"Driven Dog Crazy / Mars or Bust"	1998
Driven Dog Crazy: Digswell borrows Daisy's parents' car and wrecks it. Daisy insists he takes lessons, but his instructor is so terrified he ejects from the vehicle. Digswell finds himself being the getaway driver for some criminals. Out of control, Digswell takes them to a grand prix which he accidentally wins. Mars or Bust: Digswell volunteers to take a "spare part" to an astronaut stranded on Mars. After interrupting a Martian picnic, and escaping the traffic police, they get the part to the astronaut who is then able to return to earth. The News reads "Astronaut Saved by Friendly Aliens".
7	"In a Cauldron of Chaos / Gone to the Dogs"	1998
In a Cauldron of Chaos: Digswell and Daisy dig back to medieval times. They appear in a dungeon, and mess up Merlin's spell. A chase ensues all over the castle. Digswell must rescue Damsel Daisy when she is hidden away in a tower, but before he can, he finds himself in a jousting tournament. Gone to the Dogs: Digswell and Daisy hit the track - Greyhounds. Digswell enters a race. Although overweight and not in peak fitness he makes it to the start line. They're off! The other dogs speed past him but Digswell jumps on the rabbit and rides towards the finish line.
8	"Kung Pooch / The Howling Inferno"	1998
Kung Pooch: Digswell summons his friend Eatswell to help defeat the sumo wrestler "Giant Waka No Hana" . Eatswell eats everything in sight, and mistakes Waka No Hana's fingers for sausages and bites into them. Meanwhile Digswell accidentally enters a Karate competition and is having some trouble of his own. Howling Inferno: The world's tallest building is on fire. Digswell attempts to rescue Rita Rubbo, star of the silent screen who is trapped inside. Dragging the garden hose behind him he conquers obstacles and saves Rita, but then Daisy's father reels in the garden hose, dragging him back home at a rate of knots.
9	"A Few Hollers More / Puppy Love"	1998
A Few Hollers More: Digswell journeys to the Wild West to get a secret tonic for Daisy, who is sick. However, a cowboy buys the last bottle and Digswell finds himself in an array of ugly situations while trying to relieve him of it. When he finally gets the tonic, he drinks it himself, and we see its comical side-effects. Puppy Love: Digswell falls in love with the beautiful Collie Minogue, winner of a dog beauty pageant. Her Agent, Roger Rogue, however, is holding her a virtual prisoner. Digswell encounters many obstacles as he tries to get to Collie and finally rescues her, only to be jilted for an Alsatian.
10	"Gangbusters / Paw-varotti"	1998
Gangbusters: Digswell is threatened by Dog Corleone. Unless he uses his tunnelling talent for nefarious ends, he is in for it! Digswell goes to Al Capone for help and wins his respect after a series of escapades. Upon his return home he triumphs over Dog Corleone, every inch the scary gangster. Paw-varotti: Digswell and Daisy tunnel their way to the Opera, where a diva is trying to take over from the timid theatre owner. They surface on stage but under the diva's skirts. There is mayhem as a chase ensues. Digswell exposes the Diva as a fraud with help from his friend Singswell.
11	"Jailbreak / Surf's Pup"	1998
Jailbreak: Digswell is captured by chief dog catcher Willie Schnappsiedir. Daisy desperately tries to free her dog. Surf's Pup: Digswell wants to participate in the surfing world championship, because the winner beckons a promising price.
12	"It's a Dog's Law / Loop the Loopy"	1998
It's a Dog's Law: Digswell is going to be sued by the postal service, if he can't behave in one week. Digswell cannot help himself and continues chasing postmen. They wind up in court and Digswell enlists the aid of his comrades. It is Daisy who has an idea that makes everyone happy. Loop the Loopy: Lovely Lottie is kidnapped by Von Grundler at the Air Show. Digswell and Daisy decide to rescue her. Digswell summons his friend Flieswell to join him in taking Lottie's place in the show. Digswell takes Von Grundler on a wild victory flight, and then rescues the Lovely Lottie.
13	"Digswell Downunder / Dog of the Antarctic"	1998
Digswell Downunder: Digswell and Daisy travel to Australia in search of gold. Digswell decides to help find a stolen gold nugget, worth over $1 million. After a fight with the thief they escape into an old mine on rickety carts and have the ride of their lives. Crocodiles, emus and a boomerang all get in the war before they find the nugget. Dog of the Antarctic: Digswell goes on a trek to the South Pole. He sneaks on board the Titanic II, but escapes before it hits an iceberg and sinks. He is rescued from the freezing ocean by his friend Swimswell, who propels him to Antarctica. Some mischievous penguins misdirect him and he finds himself among some ancient and hungry explorers.

== See also ==
- List of Australian television series
