= 1998 in Italian television =

This is a list of Italian television related events from 1998.

== Events ==
- 30 April: Law 122 on television establishes the obligation for national channels to devote at least 50% of their broadcasting time to works of European production.

=== RAI ===
- 12 January: for the first time, RAI broadcasts a news program in Ladin language.
- 29 January: renewal of the top management of RAI and the board of directors; Roberto Zaccaria becomes president, Pier Giorgio Celli general manager.
- 2 February: on RAI 1, the first edition of the news program for children is aired, it is hosted by Tiziana Ferrario.
- 8 February: during the afternoon show Domenica in, in the presence of Treasury Minister Carlo Azeglio Ciampi, the audience at home chooses the subjects of Italian euro coins through a vote via telephone.
- 28 February: Annalisa Minetti wins Sanremo festival (both for the Champions and for the Youth category) with Senza te o con te; the singer, in the talk following the festival, has a violent quarrel with the writer Aldo Busi, who accuses her of having exploited her blindness. The festival, hosted by Raimondo Vianello, is the second most watched show of the year with 15,072, million viewers.
- 18 June : The Italy-Cameroon match at the 1998 FIFA World Cup is the most-watched program of the year, with 25.543 million viewers.
- 9 September : death of Lucio Battisti. RAI remembers him with a special hosted by Vincenzo Mollica (Lucio, quante emozioni); two days later, Mediaset too pays a tribute to the singer-songwriter with a concert from Piazza del Campidoglio, ideated by Maurizio Costanzo and presented by Loretta Goggi (Il mio canto libero – Concerto per Lucio Battisti)
- 13 October : During a special evening of Porta a porta for Pope John Paul II’s twenty years of pontificate, the pope himself phones on air to thank the host Bruno Vespa.
- 8 December : the first episode of Un medico in famiglia is aired on RAI Uno.
- 16 December: agreement between RAI and Tele+ Digitale. RAI undertakes to provide the satellite platform with its six existing digital channels, plus five more by the year 2000.

=== Mediaset ===
- 25 February: Canale 5, in competition with the Sanremo Festival, broadcasts Indagine sulla canzone truccata (Enquiry about the tricked song), an alleged investigative program conducted by Emilio Fede. At the opening, the journalist announces the arrest (never happened) of Iva Zanicchi. The staging continues for two hours, with fake images and comments from guests in the studio, until the singer herself intervenes live to reassure the public. The provocation is much criticized, even inside Mediaset.
- 8 March: in the Tele+ platform, Happy Channel, produced by Mediaset, makes its debut
- 20 March: Berlusconi family rejects Rupert Murdoch's offer to buy Mediaset for seven trillion lire.

=== Satellite ===
- 9 February: on satellite, the Catholic channel SAT 2000 begins broadcasting; it’s owned by the Episcopal Conference and directed by Emanuele Milano, former director of RAI 1 and Telemontecarlo.
- 15 June: the pay-TV platform Stream TV, already active via cable since 1996, begins broadcasting on the Hotbird satellite, in competition with the already existing Tele+ Digitale. On December 26, Rupert Murdoch acquires 80% of Stream's shares.
- 1 September: on the Tele+ Digitale platform, birth of the first Italian all-news channel, INN (Italian News Network, realized in a cooperative by 18 local television stations) and of the first Italian thematic one, Marcopolo, (specialized in travels); both are produced by Sitcom company

== Debuts ==
=== RAI ===
==== Miniseries ====
- Le ragazze di Piazza di Spagna (The Piazza di Spagna girls) – by various directors, with Romina Mondello, Vittoria Belvedere and Alice Evans; 3 seasons. Inspired by the 1952 film Three girls from Rome, it is the story of three young would-be models.

==== Serials ====
- Incantesimo (Charm) – soap opera set in a clinic in Rome, with Agnese Nano, Paola Pitagora and Delia Boccardo; 10 seasons.

==== News and educational ====
- Blu notte – Misteri italiani (Night blue, Italian mysteries) – 12 seasons. True crime program, hosted by the mystery writer Carlo Lucarelli; the show, in the first seasons focused on the common crimes, later is extended to the Italian history’s mysteries, as the Piazza Fontana bombing.

=== Mediaset ===
==== Variety ====
- Ciao Darwin (Hallo Darwin) – game show hosted by Paolo Bonolis and Luca Laurenti; again on air. The theory of the natural selection is the pretext for burlesque tests of skill between diverse categories of persons and for exhibiting female flesh. The program, despite the charges to be “TV trash”, is now again one of the top Mediaset shows and the format has been largely imitated abroad.

== Television shows ==
=== RAI ===
==== Drama ====
- Nicholas’ gift – by Robert Markowitz, with Alan Bates and Jamie Lee Curtis, based on the true story of Nicholas Green; coproduced by Lux Vide.
- Jeremiah by Harry Winer, with Patrick Dempsey and Oliver Reed; ninth chapter of the Lux Vide Bible project.
- Più leggero non basta (Lighter is not enough) – by Elisabetta Lodoli, with Stefano Accorsi and Giovanna Mezzogiorno; drama about the disability.
- La piovra 9 – Il patto (The pact) – with Raoul Bova and Anja Kling;2 episodes. Second prequel of La piovra franchise, but with a plot almost fully on its now, set in the Catania of the Sixties.

=== Fininvest ===
==== Drama ====
- Ultimo (Last) – by Stefano Reali, with Raoul Bova and Ricky Memphis; 2 episodes. Reconstruction, very fictionalized, of the Totò Riina’s capture by a special force of carabineers, led by the “Commander Last” (Sergio Di Caprio). The movie has 4 sequels.

==== Miniseries ====
- Anni ’50 (The Fifties) – by Carlo Vanzina, with Ezio Greggio; 4 episodes. The series is a tribute to Bread, love and dreams and to the Italian neorealist comedies.

==== Serials ====
- Professione fantasma (Profession ghost) – by Vittorio De Sisti, with Massimo Lopez and Edy Angelillo. The ghost of a private eye remains on earth to watch over his girl-friend.

==== Variety ====
- Italia Unz – show of disco music from the Riccione water park, care of the Radio Deejay team.

== Networks and services ==
=== Launches ===
Network	Type	Launch date	Notes	Source
Happy Channel	Satellite television	8 March		
Disney Channel	Cable and satellite	3 October		
Video Italia	Cable and satellite	10 December		

=== Conversions and rebrandings ===
Old network name	New network name	Type	Conversion Date	Notes	Source

=== Closures ===
Network	Type	Closure date	Notes	Source

== Deaths ==
- September 8: Lucio Battisti (55), singer-songwriter.
