= TV 2 Sonen 24/7 =

Ownership
- Owner: Schibsted ASA, Egmont Holding AS, A-Pressen ASA, A-Pressen TV AS

History
- Launched: March 2007
- Closed: July, 2007

TV 2 Sonen 24/7 was a Norwegian interactive television channel based on a show on TV 2 and TV 2 Zebra where viewers could communicate with the host via SMS. play games and request songs.
