= 1962 in Norwegian television =

This is a list of Norwegian television related events from 1962.

== Events ==
- 18 February – Inger Jacobsen is selected to represent Norway at the 1962 Eurovision Song Contest with her song "Kom sol, kom regn". She is selected to be the third Norwegian Eurovision entry during Norsk Melodi Grand Prix held at NRK Studios in Oslo.

== Births ==
- 18 December – Dorthe Skappel, TV personality and journalist.
