= 1998 in Scottish television =

This is a list of events in Scottish television from 1998.

== Events ==
=== May ===
- 31 May – Sky Scottish closes after just over eighteen months on air, because the channel fails to meet its financial targets.

=== July ===
- 29 July – British Digital Broadcasting rebrand as ONdigital.

=== September ===
- 23 September – BBC Choice, the UK's first digital-only TV station, launches. The channel broadcasts around two hours each night of programming for Scotland as an opt-out from the main channel.

=== October ===
- 1 October – Digital satellite television launches in the UK, operated by Sky Digital. This sees the start of UK channels transmitting in 16:9 widescreen.

=== December ===
- 11 December – BBC governors reject a request to give Scotland its own Six O'Clock News bulletin. Instead an extra £20m will be spent on new jobs and programming in Scotland, Wales and Northern Ireland.

== Debuts ==
=== BBC ===
- Unknown – Looking After Jo Jo (1998)

== Television series ==
- Scotsport (1957–2008)
- Reporting Scotland (1968–1983; 1984–present)
- Scotland Today (1972–2009)
- Sportscene (1975–present)
- The Beechgrove Garden (1978–present)
- Grampian Today (1980–2009)
- High Road (1980–2003)
- Taggart (1983–2010)
- Crossfire (1984–2004)
- Wheel of Fortune (1988–2001)
- Fun House (1989–1999)
- Win, Lose or Draw (1990–2004)
- Machair (1993–1999)
- Telefios (1993–2000)
- Only an Excuse? (1993–2020)

== Ending this year ==
- 15 July – Top Club (1971–1998)
- 7 December – McCallum (1995–1998)
- 24 December – The Baldy Man (1995–1998)

== See also ==
- 1998 in Scotland
