= 2014 in Norwegian television =

This is a list of Norwegian television related events from 2014.

== Events ==
- 23 May - 8-year-old jazz singer Angelina Jordan Astar wins the sixth series of Norske Talenter.
- 8 November - The BlackSheeps singer Agnete Kristin Johnsen and her partner Egor Filipenko win the tenth series of Skal vi danse?.
- 11 December - Anders Olsson from Sweden wins series 3 of the Scandinavian version of Big Brother, becoming the show's first male winner.
- 12 December - Ingvar Olsen the eighth series of Idol.

== Debuts ==
- 31 August - The Scandinavian version of Big Brother (2005-2006, 2014–present)

== Television shows ==
=== 2000s ===
- Idol (2003-2007, 2011–present)
- Skal vi danse? (2006–present)
- Norske Talenter (2008–present)

=== 2010s ===
- The Voice – Norges beste stemme (2012–present)

== Networks and services ==
=== Launches ===
Network	Type	Launch date	Notes	Source
Viasat 4	Cable television	14 June		

=== Conversions and rebrandings ===
Old network name	New network name	Type	Conversion Date	Notes	Source
Viasat Explorer	Viasat Explore	Cable television	January		

=== Closures ===
Network	Type	End date	Notes	Sources
Viasat 3D	Cable television	15 January		

== See also ==
- 2014 in Norway
