= 1966 in Norwegian television =

This is a list of Norwegian television related events from 1966.

== Events ==
- 5 February – Åse Kleveland is selected to represent Norway at the 1966 Eurovision Song Contest with her song "Intet er nytt under solen". She is selected to be the seventh Norwegian Eurovision entry during Norsk Melodi Grand Prix held at Centralteatret in Oslo.
