= 1960 in Norwegian television =

This is a list of Norwegian television related events from 1960.

== Events ==
- 20 February – Nora Brockstedt is selected to represent Norway at the 1960 Eurovision Song Contest with her song "Voi Voi". She is selected to be the first Norwegian Eurovision entry during Melodi Grand Prix held at NRK Studios in Oslo.
- 29 March – Norway enters the Eurovision Song Contest for the first time with "Voi Voi" performed by Nora Brockstedt.

== Networks and services ==
=== Launches ===
Network	Type	Launch date	Notes	Source
NRK	Cable television	20 August		
