= 2012 in Norwegian television =

This is a list of Norwegian television related events from 2012.

== Events ==
- 25 May - Martin Halla wins the first series of The Voice – Norges beste stemme.
- 17 November - Singer Hanne Sørvaag and her partner Egor Filipenko win the eighth series of Skal vi danse?
- 7 December - 17-year-old opera singer Stine Hole Ulla wins the fifth series of Norske Talenter.

== Debuts ==
=== Domestic ===
- 27 January - The Voice – Norges beste stemme (2012–present)

=== International ===
- (United Kingdom) / (Republic of Ireland) Tilly and Friends (NRK)

== Television shows ==
=== 2000s ===
- Idol (2003-2007, 2011–present)
- Skal vi danse? (2006–present)
- Norske Talenter (2008–present)

== Networks and services ==
=== Launches ===
Network	Type	Launch date	Notes	Source
VOX	Cable television	23 January		
Viasat Film	Cable television	3 March		
C More Tennis	Cable television	4 September		

=== Conversions and rebrandings ===
Old network name	New network name	Type	Conversion Date	Notes	Source
Canal+ Hockey	C More Hockey	Cable television	Unknown		
Canal+ Family	C More Kids	Cable television	4 September		
Canal+ Hits	C More Hits	Cable television	4 September		

=== Closures ===
Network	Type	End date	Notes	Sources
TV 2 Zebra	Cable television	26 February		

== See also ==
- 2012 in Norway
