= Moox Live =

Ownership
- Owner: Aller Edge

History
- Launched: December 2006
- Closed: August 2007

Moox Live was a Norwegian television channel in 2006–2007 with user-generated content. The viewers could vote for music videos, watch interviews with celebrities and discuss topics such as movies, fashion, celebrities, sex and love. It was taken off the air after less than one year.
