= Noman Mubashir =

Norwegian journalist

- Born: June 13, 1974 (age 51); Lørenskog, Norway
- Occupation: Journalist for NRK

Noman Mubashir (born June 13, 1974) is a Norwegian journalist employed by the NRK.

Of Pakistani descent, early in his career he hosted the multi-ethnic programme Migrapolis on NRK and later worked as a news anchor on Østlandssendingen, also NRK. He has published two books. His first release was Mitt liv som Ola Noman, where he describes in a humoristic manner his experiences growing up as a child of Pakistani immigrants in Norway. His second publication was En Noman i Pakistan which is a traveller's guide to Pakistan and completes his NRK series of the same title.

== Personal life ==
Noman Mubashir is openly gay, coming out in 2016.

== See also ==
- Norwegians of Pakistani descent
