= 1987 in Norwegian television =

This is a list of Norwegian television related events from 1987.

== Deaths ==
Date	Name	Age	Cinematic Credibility
25 January	Øivind Bergh	78	Norwegian violinist & orchestra leader

== See also ==
- 1987 in Norway
