= 1965 in Norwegian television =

This is a list of Norwegian television related events from 1965.

== Events ==
- 13 February – Kirsti Sparboe is selected to represent Norway at the 1965 Eurovision Song Contest with her song "Karusell". She is selected to be the sixth Norwegian Eurovision entry during Norsk Melodi Grand Prix held at NRK Studios in Oslo.
