= 1963 in Norwegian television =

This is a list of Norwegian television related events from 1963.

== Events ==
- 10 February – Nora Brockstedt is selected to represent Norway at the 1963 Eurovision Song Contest with her song "Solhverv". She is selected to be the fourth Norwegian Eurovision entry during Norsk Melodi Grand Prix held at NRK Studios in Oslo, but pulled out of a third Eurovision appearance, citing a scheduling conflict with other previously arrange engagements. Anita Thallaug performed Solhverv at Eurovision instead.
