= 1964 in Norwegian television =

This is a list of Norwegian television related events from 1964.

== Events ==
- 15 February – Arne Bendiksen is selected to represent Norway at the 1964 Eurovision Song Contest with his song "Spiral". He is selected to be the fifth Norwegian Eurovision entry during Norsk Melodi Grand Prix held at NRK Studios in Oslo.
