= 1999 in Norwegian television =

This is a list of Norwegian television related events from 1999.

== Events ==
- Unknown - The fourth series of Stjerner i sikte is won by Helene Silvia Moen, performing as Sarah Brightman.

== Debuts ==
=== International ===
- (Australia) Bananas in Pyjamas (TV 2)

== Television shows ==
=== 1990s ===
- Stjerner i sikte (1996-2002)

== Ending this year ==
- Sesam Stasjon (1991-1999)

== Networks and services ==
=== Launches ===
Network	Type	Launch date	Notes	Source
Sky Entertainment	Cable television	14 February		
Metropol TV	Cable television	30 September		

== Deaths ==
Date	Name	Age	Cinematic Credibility
13 September	Erik Diesen	76	Norwegian radio & TV personality

== See also ==
- 1999 in Norway
