= Disney Junior (Scandinavia) =

Scandinavian television channel

- Final logo, used from 11 February 2019 to 1 April 2024 (1 March 2024 in Denmark)
- Country: United Kingdom
- Broadcast area: Nordic countries
- Headquarters: London, United Kingdom

Programming
- Languages: English; Danish; Finnish; Norwegian; Russian (2012–2023); Swedish
- Picture format: SDTV 576i

Ownership
- Owner: The Walt Disney Company Limited; Disney Branded Television (Disney Entertainment)
- Sister channels: Disney Channel

History
- Launched: 2006; 20 years ago (channel); 2024; 2 years ago (block on Disney Channel)
- Closed: 1 March 2024; 2 years ago (Denmark, channel); 1 April 2024; 2 years ago (channel)
- Former names: Playhouse Disney (2006-2011)

Disney Junior was a British-managed Scandinavian television block owned and operated by The Walt Disney Company Limited; targeted for preschoolers targeting the Nordic countries.

== History ==
It was launched in 2006 on the Canal Digital and Viasat satellite platforms. Cable networks launched it later on. Com Hem, the largest cable network in Sweden, launched it on 2 April 2007. Before 10 September 2011, this channel was called Playhouse Disney; the last show as Playhouse Disney was Special Agent Oso at 6:30 PM.

On 19 January 2024, The Walt Disney Company Nordic announced that Disney Junior in Denmark would be closed on 1 March 2024 and its content would be moved to Disney Channel; while in February 2024, the company announced that Disney Junior would be shut down and merged with Disney Channel, at the same time to relaunch a new version of the main channel on 1 April 2024 and would also include a Disney Junior branded block during mornings and at weekends.

== Logos ==
2006–2011

2019–2024
