= 2015 in Norwegian television =

This is a list of Norwegian television related events from 2015.

== Events ==
- 5 June - Yvonne Nordvik Sivertsen wins the third series of The Voice – Norges beste stemme.
- 7 November - Singer Adelén and her partner Benjamin Jayakoddy win the eleventh series of Skal vi danse?, just three days after her 19th birthday.
- 27 November - 13-year-old guitarist Odin Landbakk wins the seventh series of Norske Talenter.

== Debuts ==
- Skam (2015–2017)

== Television shows ==
=== 2000s ===
- Idol (2003-2007, 2011–present)
- Skal vi danse? (2006–present)
- Norske Talenter (2008–present)

=== 2010s ===
- The Voice – Norges beste stemme (2012–present)

== Networks and services ==
=== Conversions and rebrandings ===
Old network name	New network name	Type	Conversion Date	Notes	Source
TV 2 Bliss	TV 2 Livsstil	Cable television	2 November		

=== Closures ===
Network	Type	End date	Notes	Sources
C More Kids	Cable television	1 February		
TV2 Filmkanalen	Cable television	2 March		
Showtime Scandinavia	Cable television	15 July		
Silver	Cable television	15 July		
Star! Scandinavia	Cable television	15 July		

== See also ==
- 2015 in Norway
