= 2013 in Norwegian television =

This is a list of Norwegian television related events from 2013.

== Events ==
- 10 May - Siri Vølstad Jensen wins the seventh series of Idol.
- 23 November - Singer and runner up of the seventh series of Idol Eirik Søfteland and his partner Nadya Khamitskaya win the ninth series of Skal vi danse?.
- 13 December - Knut Marius wins the second season of The Voice – Norges beste stemme.

== Television shows ==
=== 2000s ===
- Idol (2003–2007, 2011–present)
- Skal vi danse? (2006–present)
- Norske Talenter (2008–present)

=== 2010s ===
- The Voice – Norges beste stemme (2012–present)

== Networks and services ==
=== Launches ===
Network	Type	Launch date	Notes	Source
TV2 Zebra HD	Cable television	12 December		

=== Conversions and rebrandings ===
Old network name	New network name	Type	Conversion Date	Notes	Source
Fox Crime	Fox	Cable television	1 July		

== See also ==
- 2013 in Norway
