= 2004 in Norwegian television =

This is a list of Norwegian television related events from 2004.

== Events ==
- 14 May - Kjartan Salvesen wins the second series of Idol. His debut single, "Standing Tall" reaches number one in the VG-lista three weeks later.

== Debuts ==
=== International ===
- January - (United Kingdom) Tractor Tom (TV 2)

== Television shows ==
=== 2000s ===
- Idol (2003-2007, 2011–present)

== Networks and services ==
=== Launches ===
| Network | Type | Launch date | Notes | Source |
|---|---|---|---|---|
| TV2 Xtra | Cable television | 24 January | | |
| Viasat Sport 3 | Cable television | 1 February | | |
| Canal+ Film 2 | Cable television | 1 May | | |
| Canal+ Sport | Cable television | 1 May | | |
| Showtime Scandinavia | Cable television | 30 September | | |
| Viasat History | Cable television | 1 November | | |

== See also ==
- 2004 in Norway
