= 1961 in Norwegian television =

This is a list of Norwegian television related events from 1961.

== Events ==
- 18 February – Nora Brockstedt is selected to represent Norway at the 1961 Eurovision Song Contest with her song "Sommer i Palma". She is selected to be the second Norwegian Eurovision entry during Melodi Grand Prix held at NRK Studios in Oslo.

== Births ==
- 18 March – Ingvild Bryn, news anchor.
