= 2001 in Norwegian television =

This is a list of Norwegian television related events from 2001.

== Events ==
- 24 February – The television reality show Big Brother Norway debuts on TVN.
- 31 May – The first series of Big Brother Norway is won by Lars Joakim Ringom.
- Unknown – Benedikte Narum, performing as Joni Mitchell wins the fifth series of Stjerner i sikte.

== Debuts ==
- 24 February – Big Brother Norway (2001-2003, 2011)

== Television shows ==
=== 1990s ===
- Stjerner i sikte (1996-2002)

== Networks and services ==
=== Launches ===
Network	Type	Launch date	Notes	Source
Rikstoto Direkte	Cable television	12 February		
NRK Tegnspråk	Cable television	October		

=== Closures ===
Network	Type	End date	Notes	Sources
Viasat Plus	Cable television	31 December		

== Deaths ==
- 13 February – Knut Theodor Gleditsch, 62, sports commentator and journalist, cancer.

== See also ==
- 2001 in Norway
