= 2008 in Norwegian television =

This is a list of Norwegian television related events from 2008.

== Events ==
- 9 May - 16-year-old singer Erlend Bratland wins the first series of Norske Talenter.
- 14 November - Singer Lene Alexandra Øien and her partner Tom-Erik Nilsen win the fourth series of Skal vi danse?.

== Debuts ==
- 22 February - Norske Talenter (2008–present)

== Television shows ==
=== 2000s ===
- Skal vi danse? (2006–present)

== Networks and services ==
=== Launches ===
Network	Type	Launch date	Notes	Source
TVNorge HD	Cable television	3 October		
Viasat Sport	Cable television	17 October		
BBC HD	Cable television	3 December		

=== Closures ===
Network	Type	End date	Notes	Sources
Viasat Sport 2	Cable television	16 October		
Viasat Sport 3	Cable television	16 October		

== See also ==
- 2008 in Norway
