= 1967 in Norwegian television =

This is a list of Norwegian television related events from 1967.

== Events ==
- 25 February – Kirsti Sparboe is selected to represent Norway at the 1967 Eurovision Song Contest with her song "Dukkemann". She is selected to be the eighth Norwegian Eurovision entry during Norsk Melodi Grand Prix held at Centralteatret in Oslo.
