= Viasat 3D =

- Broadcast area: Sweden; Denmark; Finland; Norway
- Network: Viasat
- Headquarters: Stockholm, Sweden

Programming
- Picture format: 1080i (3DTV)

Ownership
- Owner: Modern Times Group

History
- Launched: 27 December 2010; 14 years ago
- Closed: 15 January 2014; 11 years ago

Links
- Website: www.viasat.se/3d

Viasat 3D was the first Swedish 3D TV channel and was launched on 27 December 2010. The channel was available to satellite subscribers through Viasat's digital on-demand set-top box and featured live football matches from UEFA Champions League, as well as streamed 3D video on demand movie content.

== History ==
Viasat started to offer 3D TV content as of December 2010, rolling out its full linear 3D TV channel in August 2012. It was announced that Viasat would close its dedicated TV channel as of 15 January 2014 due to low interest from the viewers, but said 3D content would be available as on-demand service.
