= Dorthe Skappel =

Norwegian television personality, journalist, celebutante and model

- Dorthe Skappel at the 2008 Quantum of Solace premiere in Oslo, Norway.
- Born: 18 December 1962 (age 62); Oslo, Norway

Dorthe Skappel (born 18 December 1962) is a Norwegian television personality, journalist, celebutante and former model, probably best known for hosting God kveld, Norge! and Gullruten on TV2.

== Personal life ==
Born Anna Dorothea Riseng, Skappel was active on stage and in theatrical work in her early teens. During the 1980s, Skappel began working as an international model in Paris, before eventually returning to Oslo and marrying her high-school boyfriend Jon Skappel, a construction engineer. She has two daughters and is currently residing with her family in Ekeberg in Oslo.

== Career ==
In the early 1990s, Skappel joined the Norwegian television channel TVNorge as an entertainer and television host, before switching to TV2, and began her career by heading the Norwegian celebrity and entertainment program God kveld, Norge! non-stop for ten years since 1997. Since hosting the show, she has raised controversy for kissing Lene Nystrøm Rasted, the lead vocalist in the pop-dance group Aqua, and having her breasts felt by Robbie Williams during an interview on the air in Bergen, Norway. Since 1999, she has also hosted the annual award-show Gullruten for the Norwegian TV business.

In 2007, Skappel was contracted to star in the Norwegian version of Dancing with the Stars, except it included dancing on ice skates and it was called Isdans, Norwegian for "Ice dance". She received critical acclaim for her performances, but on 4 May Skappel had an accident when she fell head first onto the ice while training with her partner. She was hospitalized with minor injuries and received bruises across her face, but has since recovered from the accident. Eventually, Skappel finished in fourth place.

In 2008, Skappel sparked both fame and controversy when she recorded her first music video, in which she is seen rapping and "cursing" towards known Norwegian celebrities, and even her own television network, as the video was entitled "Fuck TV2". The song then became huge a hit, as it entered the official top 20-list at VG within the first week. However, the video itself was censored by TV2 and subsequently uploaded on YouTube onto various channels, where they have altogether garnered about 100,000 viewers. Although Skappel raised controversy over the video, most fans, including most of the celebrities who were "cursed" at, applauded her rapping. Later that year, Skappel interviewed Gerard Butler regarding the release of RocknRolla, a film written and directed by Guy Ritchie. Since Alexander Rybak won the 2009 Eurovision Song Contest, Skappel has expressed interest in presenting the next contest ceremony, which will be held in Norway in 2010.

== In the media ==
As a result of her career, Dorthe Skappel's personal life has been and is still the subject of much media attention, criticism and controversy. In Norway, Skappel is considered one of the most recognizable celebrities on television and thus she is widely marketed in promotions and commercials on TV2. This is due to her high-profiled status as a Norwegian socialite and sex symbol. Additionally, Norwegian paparazzi has linked Skappel romantically with international celebrities such as Robbie Williams and Gerard Butler while Skappel has repeatedly denied this, describing these relationships as "ridiculous". Two common themes in Norwegian "gossip magazines" are Skappel's height and breast measurements.

Since 2006 Skappel, along with fellow Norwegian entertainers Tone Damli Aaberge, Pia Tjelta and Mia Gundersen, has fought an ongoing legal battle concerning an online pornography web site, which illegally contains nude photos and images of Skappel, Aaberge and Gundersen among others. The publishing of the images on the web site attracted widespread media attention, but Skappel has since claimed these to be fake and manipulated through digital technology. The site was reportedly operated by Bjørn-Endre Andersen, in addition to a number of similar web pages being operated in his name both domestically and abroad, but thus far neither the Norwegian National Authority for the Investigation and Prosecution of Economic and Environmental Crime (Økokrim) or the National Criminal Investigation Service, have concluded a successful investigation, citing the lack of evidence.

The pornography scandal was widely covered in Verdens Gang, Dagbladet and Aftenposten, three prominent newspapers in Norway, and included nude photos of dozens of high-profiled celebrities. Skappel has not been successful in removing the images from the website, and continues to claim they are digitally manipulated.

In October 2009, Skappel announced she would publish a children's novel and become a writer. This coordinated with her 23-year-old daughter Maria Skappel announcing her pregnancy. On 5 January 2010 TV 2 reported that Maria Skappel gave birth to a daughter, culminating in Dorthe Skappel becoming a grandmother at the age of 47.
