= 1997 in Norwegian television =

This is a list of Norwegian television related events from 1997.

== Events ==
- Unknown - Kjell Inge Torgersen, performing as Sting wins the second series of Stjerner i sikte.

== Television shows ==
=== 1990s ===
- Sesam Stasjon (1991-1999)
- Stjerner i sikte (1996-2002)

== Networks and services ==
=== Launches ===
| Network | Type | Launch date | Notes | Source |
|---|---|---|---|---|
| Animal Planet Nordic | Cable television | Unknown | | |
| Nickelodeon | Cable television | 1 February | | |
| Nyhetskanalen | Cable television | 18 August | | |
| National Geographic | Cable television | September | | |
| Sky Entertainment | Cable television | 15 September | | |

== Deaths ==
| Date | Name | Age | Cinematic Credibility |
|---|---|---|---|
| 5 December | Jan Voigt | 69 | Norwegian actor |

== See also ==
- 1997 in Norway
