= 1998 in Norwegian television =

This is a list of Norwegian television related events from 1998.

== Events ==
- Unknown – Toril Moe, performing as Celine Dion wins the third series of Stjerner i sikte. She was the first woman to have won.

== Television shows ==
=== 1990s ===
- Sesam Stasjon (1991–1999)
- Stjerner i sikte (1996–2002)

== Networks and services ==
=== Launches ===
Network	Type	Launch date	Notes	Source
MTV	Cable television	1 June		
Discovery Travel & Living Europe	Cable television	Unknown		

=== Closures ===
Network	Type	End date	Notes	Sources
Nyhetskanalen	Cable television	30 January		

== Births ==
- 25 February – Andrea Berntzen, actress and student

== Deaths ==
- 8 August – Bjarne Bø, 91, actor.

== See also ==
- 1998 in Norway
