= X Factor (Norwegian TV series) =

Norwegian television music talent show

- X Factor current logo (2009 – 2010)
- Created by: Simon Cowell
- Presented by: Guri Solberg (2010); Ravi (2010); Charlotte Thorstvedt (2009)
- Judges: Jan Fredrik Karlsen; Marion Ravn; Elisabeth Andreassen; Klaus Sonstad
- Original language: Norwegian
- No. of seasons: 2

Production
- Producers: FremantleMedia; Monster Media; Syco
- Production locations: Exporama Hellerudsletta (Skedsmo), Telenor Arena (Bærum) (Final)
- Running time: 60mins (inc. adverts)

Original release
- Network: TV 2
- Release: September 11, 2009 – December 17, 2010

X Factor is a Norwegian television music talent show contested by aspiring pop singers drawn from public auditions. It is broadcast on Friday evenings on the TV 2 Network in Norway.

== Judges' categories and their contestants ==
In each season, each judge is allocated a category to mentor and chooses three acts to progress to the live shows. This table shows, for each season, which category each judge was allocated and which acts he or she put through to the live shows.

Key:

– Winning judge/category. Winners are in bold, eliminated contestants in small font.

Season	Jan Fredrik Karlsen	Mira Craig	Peter Peters	—N/a
**One**	**Over 25's** **Chand Torsvik**; Mari Lorentzen; Tommy Fredvang; Stine Terese Tinker Julseth	**Groups**; Shackles; The Johnsen Sisters; No Name - No Fame; Reaching Horizons	**16-24s** Lise Mæland; Pernille Svensen Øiestad; Gabrielle Leithaug; Rikke Lie	—N/a
Season	Jan Fredrik Karlsen	Elisabeth Andreassen	Klaus Sonstad	Marion Ravn
**Two**	**Girls**; Annsofi Pettersen; Sofie Braseth; Tanita Kolås	**Over 25s** **Hans Bollandsås**; Marthe Valle; Ole Gustav Johnsen	**Groups**; Post 4 Irresistible; 2 Elements	**Boys**; Atle Pettersen; Mo; Eivind Nyberg Sagli

== Season 1 (2009) ==
The first season of the show was aired from September through to December 2009. The contestants were divided into three categories. Groups were mentored by Mira Craig, Over 25s by Jan Fredrik Karlsen and the 16-24s by Peter Peters.

=== Contestants ===
The top 12 acts were confirmed as follows:

Key:

– Winner
– Runner-up
– Third Place

Category (mentor)	Acts			
**Over 25s** (Karlsen)	Tommy Fredvang	Stine Terese Tinker Julseth	Chand Torsvik	Mari Lorentzen
**Groups** (Craig)	Reaching Horizons	The Johnsen Sisters	No Name - No Fame	Shackles
**16-24s** (Peters)	Pernille Svensen Øiestad	Lise Mæland	Rikke Lie	Gabrielle Leithaug

=== Results summary ===
Colour key:

–	Mentored by Karlsen (Over 25s)
–	Mentored by Craig (Groups)
–	Mentored by Peters (16-24s)

–	Contestant was in the bottom two and had to sing again in the final showdown
–	Contestant was announced as safe (no particular order)
–	Contestant received the fewest public votes and was immediately eliminated (no final showdown)
–	Contestant has been announced to be participating in round 2 of The X Factor 2009 Final.

	Week 1	Week 2	Week 3	Week 4	Week 5	Week 6	Week 7	Week 8	Week 9	Week 10	Final
Chand Torsvik	**Safe**	**Safe**	**Safe**	**Safe**	**Safe**	**Safe**	**Safe**	**Safe**	**Safe**	**Safe**	**Winner**
Shackles	**Safe**	**Safe**	**Bottom** **two**	**Safe**	**Bottom** **two**	**Safe**	**Bottom** **two**	**Safe**	**Bottom** **two**	**Safe**	**Runner up**
Mari Lorentzen	**Safe**	**Safe**	**Safe**	**Safe**	**Safe**	**Bottom** **two**	**Safe**	**Safe**	**Safe**	**3rd**	3rd Place (Week 10)
Lise Mæland	**Bottom** **two**	**Safe**	**Safe**	**Bottom** **two**	**Safe**	**Safe**	**Safe**	**Bottom** **two**	**Bottom** **two**	Eliminated (Week 9)	
Tommy Fredvang	**Safe**	**Safe**	**Safe**	**Safe**	**Safe**	**Safe**	**Safe**	**Bottom** **two**	Eliminated (Week 8)		
Pernille Svensen Øiestad	**Safe**	**Safe**	**Safe**	**Safe**	**Safe**	**Safe**	**Bottom** **two**	Eliminated (Week 7)			
Gabrielle Leithaug	**Safe**	**Bottom** **two**	**Safe**	**Safe**	**Safe**	**Bottom** **two**	Eliminated (Week 6)				
The Johnsen Sisters	**Safe**	**Safe**	**Safe**	**Safe**	**Bottom** **two**	Eliminated (Week 5)					
Rikke Lie	**Safe**	**Safe**	**Safe**	**Bottom** **two**	Eliminated (Week 4)						
No Name - No Fame	**Safe**	**Safe**	**Bottom** **two**	Eliminated (Week 3)							
Stine Terese Tinker Julseth	**Safe**	**Bottom** **two**	Eliminated (Week 2)								
Reaching Horizons	**Bottom** **two**	Eliminated (Week 1)									
Bottom two	Lise Mæland, Reaching Horizons	Gabrielle Leithaug, Stine Terese Tinker Julseth	Shackles, No Name - No Fame	Lise Mæland, Rikke Lie	The Johnsen Sisters, Shackles	Mari Lorentzen, Gabrielle Leithaug	Pernille Svensen Øiestad, Shackles	Lise Mæland, Tommy Fredvang	Lise Mæland, Shackles	No judges' vote or final showdown: public votes alone decide who wins	
Karlsen's vote to eliminate	Reaching Horizons	Gabrielle Leithaug	No Name - No Fame	Lise Mæland	The Johnsen Sisters	Gabrielle Leithaug	Pernille Svensen Øiestad	Lise Mæland	Lise Mæland	No judges' vote or final showdown: public votes alone decide who wins	
Craig's vote to eliminate	Lise Mæland	Stine Terese Tinker Julseth	No Name - No Fame	Rikke Lie	The Johnsen Sisters	Gabrielle Leithaug	Pernille Svensen Øiestad	Tommy Fredvang	Lise Mæland	No judges' vote or final showdown: public votes alone decide who wins	
Peters' vote to eliminate	Reaching Horizons	Stine Terese Tinker Julseth	No Name - No Fame	Rikke Lie	The Johnsen Sisters	Mari Lorentzen	Shackles	Tommy Fredvang	Shackles	No judges' vote or final showdown: public votes alone decide who wins	
Eliminated	**Reaching Horizons**; 2 of 3 votes	**Stine Terese Tinker Julseth**; 2 of 3 votes	**No Name - No Fame**; 3 of 3 votes	**Rikke Lie**; 2 of 3 votes	**The Johnsen Sisters**; 3 of 3 votes	**Gabrielle Leithaug**; 2 of 3 votes	**Pernille Svensen Øiestad**; 2 of 3 votes	**Tommy Fredvang**; 2 of 3 votes	**Lise Mæland**; 2 of 3 votes	**Mari Lorentzen**	**Shackles**
Eliminated	**Reaching Horizons**; 2 of 3 votes	**Stine Terese Tinker Julseth**; 2 of 3 votes	**No Name - No Fame**; 3 of 3 votes	**Rikke Lie**; 2 of 3 votes	**The Johnsen Sisters**; 3 of 3 votes	**Gabrielle Leithaug**; 2 of 3 votes	**Pernille Svensen Øiestad**; 2 of 3 votes	**Tommy Fredvang**; 2 of 3 votes	**Lise Mæland**; 2 of 3 votes	**Mari Lorentzen**	**Chand Torsvik**

=== Live show details ===
==== Week 1 (9 October 2009) ====
Contestants' performances on the first live show
Act	Order	Song	Result
Shackles	1	"You Keep Me Hangin' On"	Safe
Gabrielle Leithaug	2	"Ambitions"	Safe
Tommy Fredvang	3	"The Man Who Can't Be Moved"	Safe
Reaching Horizons	4	"We Are the Champions"	Eliminated
Pernille Svensen Øiestad	5	"Because of You"	Safe
Mari Lorentzen	6	"Alone"	Safe
No Name - No Fame	7	"I Get Around"	Safe
Rikke Lie	8	"All This Time (Pick-Me-Up Song)"	Safe
Chand Torsvik	9	"Diamanten"	Safe
The Johnsen Sisters	10	"Potential Breakup Song"	Safe
Stine Terese Tinker Julseth	11	"Poker Face"	Safe
Lise Mæland	12	"Say My Name"	Bottom two

Judges' votes to eliminate

- Peters: Reaching Horizons
- Craig: Lise Mæland
- Karlsen: Reaching Horizons

==== Week 2 (16 October 2009) ====
Contestants' performances on the second live show
Act	Order	Song	Result
Stine Terese Tinker Julseth	1	"I Want You Back"	Eliminated
No Name - No Fame	2	"Lollipop"	Safe
Gabrielle Leithaug	3	"Be Mine!"	Bottom two
Chand Torsvik	4	"Æ e trønder æ"	Safe
Lise Mæland	5	"No Air"	Safe
Shackles	6	"I'm So Excited"	Safe
Tommy Fredvang	7	"Me to går alltid aleina"	Safe
Rikke Lie	8	"Jolene"	Safe
The Johnsen Sisters	9	"Hit the Road Jack"	Safe
Mari Lorentzen	10	"Livin' on a Prayer"	Safe
Pernille Svensen Øiestad	11	"A Thousand Miles"	Safe

Judges' votes to eliminate

- Karlsen: Gabrielle Leithaug
- Peters: Stine Terese Tinker Julseth
- Craig: Stine Terese Tinker Julseth

==== Week 3 (23 October 2009) ====
Contestants' performances on the third live show
Act	Order	Song	Result
The Johnsen Sisters	1	"Smells Like Teen Spirit"	Safe
Lise Mæland	2	"Eg Ser"	Safe
Tommy Fredvang	3	"Use Somebody"	Safe
Pernille Svensen Øiestad	4	"Bleeding Love"	Safe
No Name - No Fame	5	"Help!"	Eliminated
Mari Lorentzen	6	"Cryin'"	Safe
Rikke Lie	7	"Better Off" (original song)	Safe
Shackles	8	"Circle of Life"	Bottom two
Chand Torsvik	9	"Eg Komme"	Safe
Gabrielle Leithaug	10	"These Words"	Safe

Judges' votes to eliminate

- Karlsen: No Name - No Fame
- Peters: No Name - No Fame
- Craig: No Name - No Fame

==== Week 4 (30 October 2009) ====
Contestants' performances on the fourth live show
Act	Order	Song	Result
Chand Torsvik	1	"En Jävel På Kärlek"	Safe
Rikke Lie	2	"Lovefool"	Eliminated
The Johnsen Sisters	3	"Sober"	Safe
Gabrielle Leithaug	4	"Is This Love"	Safe
Shackles	5	"Survivor"	Safe
Lise Mæland	6	"Wish I Didn't Miss You"	Bottom two
Tommy Fredvang	7	"Wake Up Call" (original song)	Safe
Pernille Svensen Øiestad	8	"Måndagsbarn"	Safe
Mari Lorentzen	9	"Säg Det Igjen"	Safe

Judges' votes to eliminate

- Karlsen: Lise Mæland
- Craig: Rikke Lie
- Peters: Rikke Lie

==== Week 5 (6 November 2009) ====
Contestants' performances on the fifth live show
Act	Order	Song	Result
Lise Mæland	1	"The Power of Love"	Safe
Shackles	2	"Gimme! Gimme! Gimme! (A Man After Midnight)"/"Voulez-Vous"	Bottom two
Mari Lorentzen	3	"Unintended"	Safe
Gabrielle Leithaug	4	"Valerie"	Safe
Pernille Svensen Øiestad	5	"I Will Always Love You"	Safe
Tommy Fredvang	6	"Man in the Mirror"	Safe
The Johnsen Sisters	7	"Can't Fight the Moonlight	Eliminated
Chand Torsvik	8	"Sånne Som Oss"	Safe

Judges' votes to eliminate

- Karlsen: The Johnsen Sisters
- Peters: The Johnsen Sisters
- Craig: The Johnsen Sisters

==== Week 6 (13 November 2009) ====
Contestants' performances on the sixth live show
Act	Order	Song	Result
Chand Torsvik	1	"Levva Livet"	Safe
Pernille Svensen Øiestad	2	"Imagine"	Safe
Mari Lorentzen	3	"Stop!"	Bottom two
Gabrielle Leithaug	4	"En natt forbi"	Eliminated
Tommy Fredvang	5	"Against All Odds (Take a Look at Me Now)"	Safe
Shackles	6	"Free Your Mind"	Safe
Lise Mæland	7	"Gabriellas sång"	Safe

Judges' votes to eliminate

- Karlsen: Gabrielle Leithaug
- Peters: Mari Lorentzen
- Craig: Gabrielle Leithaug

==== Week 7 (20 November 2009) ====
- Theme: Songs from films

Contestants' performances on the seventh live show
Act	Order	Song	Film	Result
Tommy Fredvang	1	"Life Is a Highway"	Cars	Safe
Pernille Svensen Øiestad	2	"All Dressed in Love"	Sex and the City	Eliminated
Mari Lorentzen	3	"Blaze of Glory"	Young Guns II	Safe
Shackles	4	"Move"	Dreamgirls	Bottom two
Lise Mæland	5	"Work It Out"	Austin Powers in Goldmember	Safe
Chand Torsvik	6	"Love Don't Bother Me"	Nord	Safe

Judges' votes to eliminate

- Peters: Shackles
- Craig: Pernille Svensen Øiestad
- Karlsen: Pernille Svensen Øiestad

== Season 2 (2010) ==
The second and final season of the show was aired from September to December 2010. Auditions were held in Tromsø (28–29 April 2010), Trondheim (7–9 May), Bergen (26–28 May), Kristiansand (5–6 June) and Oslo (17–20 June 2010).

Replacing Charlotte Thorstvedt as new program presenters were Ravi and Guri Solberg after Thorstvedt received much criticism for her efforts in the first season. The judges were Elisabeth Andreassen, Klaus Sonstad, Jan Fredrik Karlsen and Marion Ravn.

The format had changed with 4 categories instead of three (with Under 25s now divided between Boys Under 25 and Girls Under 25). Each category had three finalists instead of the earlier four.

24 reached judges houses. Andreassen was helped by Alexander Rybak, Sonstad by Mariann Thomassen, Karlsen by Chand Torsvik and Ravn by Sveinung Sundli. Singer Benn was a guest judge.

The 12 eliminated acts were:

- Boys: Adrian Jørgensen, Bjørn Henrik Brandtenborg, Jonas Nybakk Benyoub
- Girls: Ingrid Galadriel Aune Brosveet, Ingrid Haukland, Madeleine Christensen
- Over 25s: Marianne Solberg Follestad, Jan Hedelund, Dilsa Calimli
- Groups: Nemesis, Skatebirds, Mama's Garden

=== Contestants ===
The top 12 acts were confirmed as follows:

Key:

– Winner
– Runner-up
– Third Place

Category (mentor)	Acts		
**Over 25s** (Andreassen)	Ole Gustav Johnsen	Marthe Valle	Hans Bollandsås
**Groups** (Sonstad)	Irresistible	2 Elements	Post 4
**Girls** (Karlsen)	Annsofi Pettersen	Sofie Braseth	Tanita Kolås
**Boys** (Ravn)	Mo	Eivind Nyberg Sagli	Atle Pettersen

=== Results summary ===
Colour key:

–	Mentored by Karlsen (Girls)
–	Mentored by Sonstad (Groups)
–	Mentored by Ravn (Boys)
–	Mentored by Andreassen (Over 25s)

–	Contestant was in the bottom two and had to sing again in the final showdown
–	Contestant was announced as safe (no particular order)
–	Contestant received the fewest public votes and was immediately eliminated (no final showdown)

	Week 1	Week 2	Week 3	Week 4	Week 5	Week 6	Week 7	Week 8	Week 9	Final	
	Week 1	Week 2	Week 3	Week 4	Week 5	Week 6	Week 7	Week 8	Week 9	Round 1	Round 2
Hans Bollandsås	**11th**	**Safe**	**Safe**	**Safe**	**Safe**	**Safe**	**Safe**	**Safe**	**Safe**	**Safe**	**WINNER**
Atle Pettersen	**Safe**	**Safe**	**Safe**	**Safe**	**Safe**	**Safe**	**Safe**	**Safe**	**Safe**	**Safe**	**RUNNER UP**
Annsofi Pettersen	**Safe**	**Safe**	**Safe**	**Bottom** **two**	**Safe**	**6th**	**Safe**	**4th**	**Safe**	**3rd**	Eliminated (Week 10)
Mo	**Safe**	**Safe**	**Safe**	**Safe**	**Safe**	**Safe**	**Safe**	**Safe**	**4th**	Eliminated (Week 9)	
Eivind Nyberg Sagli	**Safe**	**Safe**	**Safe**	**Safe**	**Bottom** **two**	**Safe**	**5th**	**5th**	Eliminated (Week 8)		
Post 4	**Safe**	**Safe**	**Safe**	**Safe**	**Safe**	**Safe**	**6th**	Eliminated (Week 7)			
Marthe Valle	**Safe**	**Safe**	**Bottom** **two**	**Safe**	**Safe**	**7th**	Eliminated (Week 6)				
Ole Gustav Johnsen	**Safe**	**Safe**	**Safe**	**Safe**	**Bottom** **two**	Eliminated (Week 5)					
Irresistible	**Safe**	**10th**	**Safe**	**Bottom** **two**	Eliminated (Week 4)						
Sofie Bratseth	**Safe**	**Safe**	**Bottom** **two**	Eliminated (Week 3)							
Tanita Kolås	**Safe**	**11th**	Eliminated (Week 2)								
2 Elements	**12th**	Eliminated (Week 1)									
Bottom two	Hans Bollandsås, 2 Elements	Irresistible, Tanita Kolås	Marthe Valle, Sofie Bratseth	Annsofi Pettersen, Irresistible	Eivind Nyberg Sagli, Ole Gustav Johnsen	Annsofi Pettersen, Marthe Valle	No judges' vote or final showdown: public votes alone decide who wins				
Karlsen's vote to eliminate	Hans Bollandsås	Irresistible	Sofie Bratseth	Irresistible	Ole Gustav Johnsen	Marthe Valle	No judges' vote or final showdown: public votes alone decide who wins				
Ravn's vote to eliminate	2 Elements	Tanita Kolås	Sofie Bratseth	Irresistible	Ole Gustav Johnsen	Marthe Valle	No judges' vote or final showdown: public votes alone decide who wins				
Sonstad's vote to eliminate	Hans Bollandsås	Tanita Kolås	Sofie Bratseth	Annsofi Pettersen	Ole Gustav Johnsen	Annsofi Pettersen	No judges' vote or final showdown: public votes alone decide who wins				
Andreassen's Vote to eliminate	2 Elements	Irresistible	Sofie Bratseth	Irresistible	Eivind Nyberg Sagli	Annsofi Pettersen	No judges' vote or final showdown: public votes alone decide who wins				
Eliminated
Eliminated	**2 Elements**; 2 of 4 votes - televote	**Tanita Kolås**; 2 of 4 votes - televote	**Sofie Bratseth**; 4 of 4 votes	**Irresistible**; 3 of 4 votes	**Ole Gustav Johnsen**; 3 of 4 votes	**Marthe Valle**; 2 of 4 votes - televote	**Post 4**	**Eivind Nyberg Sagli**	**Mo**	**Annsofi Pettersen**	**Atle Petterson**
Eliminated	**2 Elements**; 2 of 4 votes - televote	**Tanita Kolås**; 2 of 4 votes - televote	**Sofie Bratseth**; 4 of 4 votes	**Irresistible**; 3 of 4 votes	**Ole Gustav Johnsen**; 3 of 4 votes	**Marthe Valle**; 2 of 4 votes - televote	**Post 4**	**Eivind Nyberg Sagli**	**Mo**	**Annsofi Pettersen**	**Hans Bollandsås**

=== Live show details ===
==== Week 1 (8 October 2010) ====
Contestants' performances on the first live show
Act	Order	Song	Result
Hans Bollandsås	1	"Bad Things"	Bottom two
2 Elements	2	"Long Train Runnin'"	Eliminated
Sofie Bratseth	3	"The Scientist"	Safe
Atle Pettersen	4	"Iris"	Safe
Tanita Kolås	5	"Love the Way You Lie (Part II)"/"Russian Roulette"	Safe
Eivind Nyberg Sagli	6	"Who Says"	Safe
Post 4	7	"You Get What You Give"	Safe
Marthe Valle	8	"Angel"	Safe
Ole Gustav Johnsen	9	"Everything"	Safe
Irresistible	10	"(You Drive Me) Crazy"	Safe
Annsofi Pettersen	11	"Stay with Me"	Safe
Mo	12	"Jailhouse Rock"	Safe

Judges' votes to eliminate

- Andreassen: 2 Elements
- Sonstad: Hans Bollandsås
- Ravn: 2 Elements
- Karlsen: Hans Bollandsås

==== Week 2 (15 October 2010) ====
- Theme: Love songs

Contestants' performances on the second live show
Act	Order	Song	Result
Tanita Kolås	1	"Bed of Roses"	Eliminated
Ole Gustav Johnsen	2	"Min første kjærlighet"	Safe
Post 4	3	"Everything"	Safe
Eivind Nyberg Sagli	4	"Let's Just Fall In Love Again"	Safe
Irresistible	5	"There You'll Be"	Bottom two
Hans Bollandsås	6	"If It Wasn't For You" (original song)	Safe
Annsofi Pettersen	7	"Genie in a Bottle"	Safe
Mo	8	"Bad Romance"	Safe
Sofie Bratseth	9	"Miss You Like Crazy"	Safe
Atle Pettersen	10	"Dancing on My Own"	Safe
Marthe Valle	11	"Need You Now"	Safe

Judges' votes to eliminate

- Karlsen: Irresistible
- Ravn: Tanita Kolås
- Sonstad: Tanita Kolås
- Andreassen: Irresistible

==== Week 3 (22 October 2010) ====
- Theme: Songs from childhood

Contestants' performances on the third live show
Act	Order	Song	Result
Mo	1	"Heal the World"	Safe
Sofie Bratseth	2	"Unforgivable Sinner"	Eliminated
Marthe Valle	3	"Benen i kors"	Bottom two
Eivind Nyberg Sagli	4	"In My Head"	Safe
Post 4	5	"Walking the Unknown" (original song)	Safe
Annsofi Pettersen	6	"Think Twice"	Safe
Hans Bollandsås	7	"Hoochie Coochie Man"	Safe
Ole Gustav Johnsen	8	"Lost In the Tango"	Safe
Irresistible	9	"AM to PM"	Safe
Atle Pettersen	10	"Sex on Fire"	Safe

Judges' votes to eliminate

- Karlsen: Sofie Bratseth
- Andreassen: Sofie Bratseth
- Ravn: Sofie Bratseth
- Sonstad: Sofie Bratseth

==== Week 4 (29 October 2010) ====
- Theme: Unplugged songs

Contestants' performances on the fourth live show
Act	Order	Song	Result
Atle Pettersen	1	"Free Fallin'"	Safe
Ole Gustav Johnsen	2	"Tir Na Noir"	Safe
Annsofi Pettersen	3	"Nothing Else Matters"	Bottom two
Mo	4	"Faith"	Safe
Irresistible	5	"Irreplaceable"	Eliminated
Hans Bollandsås	6	"Hunting High and Low"	Safe
Eivind Nyberg Sagli	7	"Tears in Heaven"	Safe
Post 4	8	"Stuck in a Moment You Can't Get Out Of"	Safe
Marthe Valle	9	"Inni dæ sjøl" (original song)	Safe

Judges' votes to eliminate

- Karlsen: Irresistible
- Ravn: Irresistible
- Sonstad: Annsofi Pettersen
- Andreassen: Irresistible

==== Week 5 (5 November 2010) ====
- Theme: Songs from films

Contestants' performances on the fifth live show
Act	Order	Song	Film	Result
Ole Gustav Johnsen	1	"As Time Goes By"	Casablanca	Eliminated
Post 4	2	"Everybody's Changing"	One Tree Hill	Safe
Eivind Nyberg Sagli	3	"A Thousand Miles"	White Chicks	Bottom two
Hans Bollandsås	4	"Footloose"	Footloose	Safe
Annsofi Pettersen	5	"Proud Mary"	What's Love Got to Do with It	Safe
Atle Pettersen	6	"We All Die Young"	Rock Star	Safe
Marthe Valle	7	"Both Sides, Now"	Love Actually	Safe
Mo	8	"You're the One That I Want"	Grease	Safe

Judges' votes to eliminate

- Andreassen: Eivind Nyberg Sagli
- Sonstad: Ole Gustav Johnsen
- Ravn: Ole Gustav Johnsen
- Karlsen: Ole Gustav Johnsen

==== Week 6 (12 November 2010) ====
- Theme: Songs about friendship

Contestants' performances on the sixth live show
Act	Order	Song	Result
Marthe Valle	1	"Pride (In the Name of Love)"	Eliminated
Atle Pettersen	2	"Umbrella"	Safe
Mo	3	"That's What Friends Are For"	Safe
Post 4	4	"Ordinary World"	Safe
Hans Bollandsås	5	"Moments" (original song)	Safe
Annsofi Pettersen	6	"Black Velvet"	Bottom two
Eivind Nyberg Sagli	7	"The Remedy (I Won't Worry)"	Safe

Judges' votes to eliminate

- Karlsen: Marthe Valle
- Andreassen: Annsofi Pettersen
- Ravn: Marthe Valle
- Sonstad: Annsofi Pettersen

==== Week 7 (19 November 2010) ====
- Theme: Songs by Norwegian artists

Contestants' performances on the seventh live show
Act	Order	First Song	Order	Second Song	Result
Atle Pettersen	1	"Forelska i lærer'n"	7	"Velvet"	Safe
Hans Bollandsås	2	"Avsted" (original song)	9	"I Came Here to Rock"	Safe
Post 4	3	"Englefjes"	10	"Her kommer vinteren"	Eliminated
Annsofi Pettersen	4	"Tigergutt"	8	"My Lullaby"	Safe
Eivind Nyberg Sagli	5	"Jenter"	11	"If a Song Could Get Me You"	Safe
Mo	6	"Optimist"	12	"Glow"	Safe

==== Week 8 (26 November 2010) ====
- Theme: Role models

Contestants' performances on the eighth live show
Act	Order	First Song	Order	Second Song	Result
Mo	1	"Purple Rain"	8	"Beat It"	Safe
Eivind Nyberg Sagli	2	"Your Song"	5	"I'm Yours"	Eliminated
Hans Bollandsås	3	"Love Hurts"	7	"Chain of Fools"	Safe
Annsofi Pettersen	4	"Speechless"	9	"I Don't Believe You"	Safe
Atle Pettersen	6	"Use Somebody"	10	"You Give Love a Bad Name"	Safe
