= Skal vi danse? =

Norwegian television program

- Genre: Dance competition
- Based on: Strictly Come Dancing
- Presented by: Season 1–2: Tommy Steine, Season 1–4: Guri Solberg; Season 3–6: Kristian Ødegård; Season 5: Pia Lykke; Season 6: Marthe Sveberg Bjørstad; Season 7: Yngvar Numme; Season 7–17: Katrine Moholt; Season 8—9 Carsten Skjelbreid; Season 10–11: Didrik Solli-Tangen; Season 12: Samuel Massie; Season 13–20: Anders Hoff; Season 18–20: Helene Olafsen
- Judges: Trine Dehli Cleve, Merete Mørk Lingjærde, Karianne Stensen Gulliksen, Toni Ferraz, Gyda Bloch Thorsen, Tor Fløysvik, Trond Harr, Anita Langset, Christer Tornell, Cecilie Brinck Rygel, Egor Filipenko, Tore Petterson, Morten Hegseth, Nadya Khamitskaya, Jan Thomas, Cengiz Al
- Country of origin: Norway
- Original language: Norwegian
- No. of seasons: 20

Production
- Producers: Monster Media (2006-2019); Nordisk Film TV (2020-2021)
- Running time: 1-2 hours

Original release
- Network: TV 2
- Release: 15 January 2006 – present

Skal vi danse (lit. 'Shall we dance?') is a Norwegian television series which has been broadcast on TV 2 and produced by Monster Entertainment since 2006. The series sees celebrities partner with professional dancers to compete in mainly ballroom and Latin dance. The pairs each week compete by performing one or more choreographed routines that usually revolve around a prearranged theme for that particular week. Each pair is then scored by a panel of judges and the viewers. The viewers are given a short time to place votes for their favourite pairs, usually online. Once all the votes have been added up, the pair with the lowest combined score is eliminated. This process continues until there are only two pairs left, who will compete against each other in a final before one is crowned the winner. It is based on the British reality TV competition Strictly Come Dancing and is part of the Dancing with the Stars franchise.

Skal vi danse is currently presented by Helene Olafsen and Anders Hoff. It is broadcast on Saturday evenings. Since the second season, it has been broadcast every autumn, typically starting in August, September or October. The final is usually held in November or December.

== Presenters ==
Presenter
Guest presenter
Guest judge
Contestant

Presenters	Season																		
Presenters	1	2	3	4	5	6	7	8	9	10	11	12	13	14	15	16	17	18	19
Guri Solberg																			
Tommy Steine																			
Kristian Ødegård																			
Pia Lykke																			
Marthe Sveberg Bjørstad																			
Katrine Moholt																			
Yngvar Numme																			
Carsten Skjelbreid																			
Didrik Solli-Tangen																			
Stian Blipp																			
Samuel Massie																			
Anders Hoff																			
Helene Olafsen																			

== Judges ==
Judges	Season																			
Judges	1	2	3	4	5	6	7	8	9	10	11	12	13	14	15	16	17	18	19	20
Trine Dehli Cleve	✓	✓	✓	✓	✓	✓	✓	✓	✓	✓	✓	✓	✓	✓	✓	✓	✓	✓	✓	
Tor Fløysvik	✓	✓	✓	✓	✓	✓	✓	✓	✓											
Anita Langset	✓																			
Trond Harr	✓	✓	✓																	
Cecilie Brinck Rygel		✓																		
Christer Tornell			✓	✓	✓	✓	✓	✓	✓											
Alexandra Kakurina				✓																
Karianne Stensen Gulliksen					✓	✓	✓	✓	✓											
Toni Ferraz										✓										
Gyda Bloch Thorsen										✓										
Egor Filipenko											✓	✓	✓	✓	✓	✓				
Merete Mørk Lingjærde											✓	✓	✓	✓	✓	✓	✓	✓	✓	✓
Tore Petterson											✓	✓	✓	✓	✓	✓				
Morten Hegseth																	✓	✓	✓	
Nadya Khamitskaya																				✓
Jan Thomas																				✓
Cengiz Al																				✓

== Contestants ==
=== Spring 2006 – season 1 ===
- Simen Agdestein
- Terje Sporsem
- Katrine Moholt
- Caroline Dina Kongerud
- Signy Fardal
- Finn Schjøll
- Tom A. Haug
- Anita Moen
- Otto Robsahm
- Guri Schanke

=== Autumn 2006 – season 2 ===
- Jeanette Roede
- Trude Mostue
- Christer Torjussen
- Elisabeth Andreassen
- Tone Damli Aaberge
- Susann Goksør Bjerkrheim
- Eirik Newth
- Steffen Tangstad
- Kristian Ødegård
- Ingar Helge Gimle

=== Autumn 2007 – season 3 ===
- Mari Maurstad
- Jostein Pedersen
- Dag Otto Lauritzen
- Esben Esther Pirelli Benestad
- Tshawe Baqwa
- Trine Hattestad
- Pia Haraldsen
- Liv Marit Wedvik
- Mona Grudt
- Finn Christian Jagge

=== Autumn 2008 – season 4 ===
- Gaute Ormåsen
- Hans Petter Buraas
- Tor Endresen
- Tore André Flo
- Janne Formoe
- Mikkel Gaup
- Siri Kalvig
- Hanne Krogh
- Jenny Skavlan
- Sigurd Sollien
- Lene Alexandra Øien

=== Autumn 2009 – season 5 ===
- Mia Gundersen
- Hallvard Flatland
- Anita Valen
- Ellen Arnstad
- Ole Klemetsen
- Jan Thomas
- Elin Tvedt
- Triana Iglesias
- Carsten Skjelbreid
- Margrethe Røed
- Svein Østvik

=== Autumn 2010 – season 6 ===
- Cato Zahl Pedersen
- Håvard Lilleheie
- Tommy Fredvang
- Einar Gelius
- Stig Henrik Hoff
- Stine Buer
- Cecilie Skog
- Aylar Lie
- Maria Haukaas Mittet
- Anne Marie Ottersen
- Andrine Flemmen
- Åsleik Engmark

=== Autumn 2011 – season 7 ===
- Rachel Nordtømme
- Inger Lise Hansen
- Noman Mubashir
- Stella Mwangi
- Anna Anka
- Lars Bohinen
- Kari Traa
- Rune Larsen
- Atle Pettersen
- Anders Jacobsen

=== Autumn 2012 – season 8 ===
- Hanne Sørvaag
- Lillian Müller
- Linni Meister
- Cathrine Larsåsen
- Marit Mikkelsplass
- Lars Erik Blokkhus
- Vebjørn Sand
- Eldar Vågan
- Lasse Ottesen
- Stein Johan «Steinjo» Grieg Halvorsen
- Ben Adams

=== Autumn 2013 – season 9 ===
- Isabella Martinsen
- Linda Johansen
- Pål Anders Ullevålseter
- Venke Knutson
- Jarl Goli
- Kim-Daniel Sannes
- Kathrine Sørland
- Carl I. Hagen
- Eli Hagen
- Rein Alexander
- Eirik Søfteland

=== Autumn 2014 – season 10 ===
- Kine Hellebust
- Per Heimly
- Roar Strand
- Zahid Ali
- Kash King
- Linnea Myhre
- André Villa
- Line Verndal
- Agnete Johnsen
- Fam Irvoll
- Idar Vollvik
- Caroline Berg Eriksen

=== Autumn 2015 – season 11 ===
- Katarina Flatland
- Gunvor Hals
- Stian Thorbjørnsen
- Adelén (Rusillo Steen)
- Gro-Helen Tørum
- Per Fredrik «PelleK» Åsly
- Ida Maria (Børli Sivertsen)
- Samuel Massie
- Pascal Dupuy
- Mads Kaggestad
- Gitte Witt
- Christopher Mørch Husby

=== Autumn 2016 – season 12 ===
- Alex Rosén
- Raylee
- Markus Bailey
- Roger Ruud
- Eilev Bjerkerud
- Camilla Pihl
- Katastrofe
- Glenn Jensen
- Kristin Størmer Steira
- Stine Brun Kjeldaas
- Eli Kari Gjengedal
- Jenny Jenssen

=== Autumn 2017 – season 13 ===
- Marna Haugen Burøe
- Cengiz Al
- Erik Follestad
- Erlend Elias
- Geir Schau
- Grunde Myhrer
- Hedda Kise
- Helene Olafsen
- Ida Gran-Jansen
- Jorun Stiansen
- Tommy Steine
- Trude Drevland

=== Autumn 2018 – season 14 ===
- Aleksander Sæterstøl
- Amalie Snøløs
- Aune Sand
- Dorthe Skappel
- Einar Nilsson
- Frank Løke
- Jan Gunnar Solli
- Marianne Krogness
- Martine Lunde
- Morten Hegseth Riiber
- Sophie Elise Isachsen
- Thea Næss

=== Autumn 2019 – season 15 ===
- Aleksander Hetland
- Adrian Sellevoll
- Bahareh Letnes
- Christian Strand
- Emilie Nereng
- Isabel Raad
- Jan Tore Kjær
- Jørgine Vasstrand
- Per Sandberg
- Sandra Borch
- Trine Haltvik
- Victor Sotberg

=== Autumn 2020 – season 16 ===
- Agnete Husebye
- Andreas Wahl
- Birgit Skarstein
- Fred Buljo
- Kristin Gjelsvik
- Marte Bratberg
- Michael Andreassen
- Nate Kahungu
- Siri Kristiansen
- Synnøve Skarbø
- Thomas Alsgaard
- Øystein Lihaug Solberg

=== Autumn 2021 – season 17 ===
- Siri Avlesen-Østli
- Alejandro Fuentes
- Iselin Guttormsen
- Royane Harkati
- Anniken Jørgensen
- Joakim Kleven
- Maren Lundby
- Magnus Moan
- Simon Nitsche
- Øyvind «Vinni» Sauvik
- Dennis Vareide
- Elin Ørjasæter

=== Autumn 2022 – season 18: All Stars ===
- Agnete Saba
- Aleksander Hetland
- Cengiz Al
- Eirik Søfteland
- Iselin Guttormsen
- Jørgine Massa Vasstrand
- Kari Traa
- Katrine Moholt
- Lasse Matberg
- Martine Lunde
- Nate Kahungu
- Triana Iglesias
- Victor Sotberg

=== Autumn 2023 – season 19 ===
- Alexandra Joner
- Aslak Maurstad
- Christer Rødseth
- Fritz Aanes
- Hadia Tajik
- Harlem Alexander
- Lavrans Solli
- Regina «Myra» Tucker
- Selma Ibrahim
- Stig-André Berge
- Trude Vasstrand
- Ulrikke Brandstorp

=== Autumn 2025 – season 20 ===
- Bernt Hulsker
- Carina Dahl
- Danby Choi
- Desta Beeder
- Emilie Enger Mehl
- Emma Ellingsen
- Halvor Bakke
- Tale Torjussen
- Tiril Eckhoff
- Tobias Brandal Busæt
- Trygve Bennetsen
- Vendela Kirsebom
- Viggo Venn

=== Autumn 2026 – season 21 ===
- Alessandra Mele
- Alexander Bonsaksen
- Espen PA Lervaag
- Katelyn Garbin
- Kim Wigaard
- Leah Isadora Behn
- Maria Stavang
- Sandra Lyng
- Sebastian Solberg
- Sondre Sundby
- Tim Kristian Moen
- Victoria Nadine
- Øyunn Krogh

== Professional dancers ==
• Rikke Lund | Season 14, 15, 16, 17, 18, & 20 | Jan Gunnar Solli, Victor Sotberg, Thomas Alsgaard, Øyvind Sauvik, Cengiz Al, & Viggo Venn.

• Catalin Mihu | Season 16, 17, 18, 19, & 20 | Kristin Gjelsvik, Iselin Guttormsen, Trude Vasstrand, & Emma Ellingsen.

• Ivo Havranek | Season 11, 12, 13, 14, & 20 | Gro-Helen Tørum, Eli Kari Gjengedal, Hedda Kise, Thea Næss, & Vendela Kirsebom.

• Marianne Sandaker | Season 5, 6, 7, 8, 9, 10, 11, 12, 13, 15, 19, & 20 | Ole Klemetsen, Cato Zahl Pedersen, Atle Pettersen, Stein Johan Grieg Halvorsen, Rein Alexander, Kash King, Samuel Massie, Katastrofe, Erlend Elias Bragstad, Christian Strand, Aslak Maurstad, & Bernt Hulsker.

• Antonio Careri | Season 20 | Tale Torjussen.

• Vyara Klisurska | Season 19 & 20 | Fritz Aanes & Tobias Brandal Busæt.

• Tarjei Svalastog | Season 16, 17, 18, 19 & 20 | Siri Kristiansen, Siri Avlesen-Østli, Martine Lunde, Ulrikke Brandstorp, & Desta Beeder.

• Ida Amy Sund | Season 19 & 20 | Christer Rødseth & Trygve Bennetsen.

• Ole Thomas Hansen | Season 17, 18, 19 & 20 | Royane Harkati, Triana Iglesias, Alexandra Joner, & Carina Dahl.

• Norunn Ringvoll | Season 19 & 20 | Stig-André Berge & Danby Choi.

• Santino Mirenna | Season 15, 16, 17, 18, 19 & 20 | Emilie Nereng, Synnøve Skarbø, Anniken Jørgensen, Jørgine Massa Vasstrand, Selma Ibrahim & Tiril Eckhoff.

• Amalie Aune | Season 19 & 20 | Lavrans Solli & Halvor Bakke.

• Jørgen Nilsen | Season 12, 13, 14, 15, 18, 19 & 20 | Camilla Pihl, Helene Olafsen, Amalie Snøløs, Jørgine Massa Vasstrand, Agnete Saba, Myra, & Emilie Enger Mehl.

• Helene Spilling | Season 16, 17, 18, & 19 | Nate Kahungu, Simon Nitsche, Aleksander Hetland, & Harlem Alexander.

• Jone Snilstveit | Season 19 | Hadia Tajik.

• Bjørn Wettre Holthe | Season 1, 9, 13, 14, 15, 16, & 17 | Katrine Moholt, Eli Hagen, Trude Drevland, Marianne Krogness, Sandra Borch, Agnete Husebye, & Elin Ørjasæter.

• Cecilie Brinck Rygel | Season 1 | Terje Sporsem.

• Geir Gundersen | Season 1 & 10 | Signy Fardal & Kine Hellebust.

• Gustaf Lundin | Season 1 | Dina.

• Gyda Bloch Thorsen | Season 1, 2, 3, 4, 5 & 18 | Simen Agdestein, Ingar Helge Gimle, Dag Otto Lauritzen, Hans Petter Buraas, Jan Thomas, & Lasse Matberg.

• Lena Granaas Lillebø | Season 1 & 2 | Finn Schjøll & Christer Torjussen.

• Michelle Lindøe | Season 1 & 3 | Otto Robsahm & Jostein Pedersen.

• Therese Cleve | Season 1, 2, 3, 4, 9, 10, & 11 | Tom A. Haug, Eirik Newth, Finn Christian Jagge, Mikkel Gaup, Carl I. Hagen, Per Heimly, & Mads Kaggestad.

• Thomas Kagnes | Season 1 | Anita Moen.

• Tom Arild Hansen | Season 1, 2, 11, & 15 | Guri Schanke, Trude Mostue, Katarina Flatland, & Bahareh Letnes.

• Alexandra Kakurina | Season 2, 5, 6, 7, 9, 10, 11, 12, & 13 | Kristian Ødegård, Hallvard Flatland, Stig Henrik Hoff, Lars Bohinen, Jarl Goli, Zahid Ali, Stian Thorbjørnsen, Alex Rosén, & Tommy Steine.

• Asmund Grinaker | Season 2, 3, 4, 5, 6, & 7 | Susann Goksør Bjerkrheim, Liv Marit Wedvik, Hanne Krogh, Margrethe Røed, Maria Haukaas Mittet, & Stella Mwangi.

• Ingrid Beate Thompson | Season 2, 3 & 4 | Steffen Tangstad, Esben Esther Pirelli Benestad, & Sigurd Sollien.

• Jan-Eric Fransson | Season 2 & 3 | Jeanette Roede & Mari Maurstad.

• Mats Brattlie | Season 2 & 3 | Elisabeth Andreassen & Trine Hattestad.

• Tom Erik Nilsen | Season 2, 4, 6, 8, 9, 10, & 18 | Tone Damli Aaberge, Lene Alexandra Øien, Stine Buer, Cathrine Larsåsen, Kathrine Sørland, Fam Irvoll, & Kari Traa.

• Glenn Jørgen Sandaker | Season 3, 5, 6, 7, 8, 9, 10, 11, 12, 13, & 15 | Mona Grudt, Mia Gundersen, Anne Marie Ottersen, Anna Anka, Lillian Müller, Linda Johansen, Line Verndal, Ida Maria, Jenny Jenssen, Marna Haugen Burøe, & Trine Haltvik.

• Maria Sandvik | Season 3, 4, 9, 11 & 12 | Tshawe Baqwa, Tor Endresen, Lars Erik Blokkhus, André Villa, & Christopher Mørch Husby.

• Thomas Wendel | Season 3 | Pia Haraldsen.

• Egor Filipenko | Season 4, 5, 6, 7, 8, 9, 10 & 18 | Jenny Skavlan, Elin Tvedt, Aylar Lie, Kari Traa, Hanne Sørvaag, Venke Knutson, Agnete Johnsen, & Katrine Moholt.

• Elena Bokoreva Wiulsrud | Season 6, 7, 8, 9, 10 & 11 | Gaute Ormåsen, Carsten Skjelbreid, Håvard Lilleheie, Anders Jacobsen, Eldar Vågan, & Kim-Daniel Sannes.

• Jan Erik Hansen | Season 4 | Janne Formoe.

• Lars Alexander Wiulsrud | Season 4, 5, 6, 7, 8 & 9 | Siri Kalvig, Ellen Arnstad, Andrine Flemmen, Inger Lise Hansen, Marit Mikkelsplass, & Isabella Martinsen.

• Nadya Khamitskaya | Season 4, 5, 6, 7, 8, 9, 10, 12, 15, & 18 | Tore André Flo, Svein Østvik, Åsleik Engmark, Noman Mubashir, Vebjørn Sand, Eirik Søfteland, Roar Strand, Eilev Bjerkerud, Aleksander Hetland, & Nate Kahungu.

• Alexcandar E. Halleland | Season 5 | Anita Valen de Vries.

• Tobias Karlsson | Season 5 & 6 | Triana Iglesias & Cecilie Skog.

• Olga Divakova | Season 6, 7 & 8 | Einar Gelius, Rune Larsen, & Lasse Ottesen.

• Rakel Kristina Aalmo | Season 6 | Tommy Fredvang.

• Henrik Frisk | Season 7 | Rachel Nordtømme.

• Calle Sterner | Season 8 | Linni Meister.

• Tone Jacobsen | Season 8, 14, & 15 | Ben Adams, Frank Løke, & Jan Tore Kjær.

• Anette Stokke | Season 9, 10, 11, 13, & 14 | Pål Anders Ullevålseter, Idar Vollvik, Per Fredrik Åsly, Geir Schau, & Einar Nilsson.

• Alexander Svanberg | Season 10, 12, & 14 | Linnéa Myhre, Raylee, & Dorthe Skappel.

• Kai André Lillebø | Season 10 & 11 | Caroline Berg Eriksen & Gunvor Hals.

• André Nilsen | Season 11 | Gitte Witt.

• Benjamin Jayakoddy | Season 11, 12, 13, 14, 15, 16, & 17 | Adelén, Stine Brun Kjeldaas, Ida Gran-Jansen, Sophie Elise Isachsen, Isabel Raad, Marte Bratberg, & Joakim Kleven.

• Mai Mentzoni | Season 11, 12, 13, 14, & 16 | Pascal, Markus Bailey, Cengiz Al, Morten Hegseth, & Andreas Wahl.

• Ewa Trela | Season 12, 13, 14, 15, 16, 17 & 18 | Glenn Jensen, Grunde Myhrer, Aune Sand, Per Sandberg, Michael Andreassen, Magnus Moan, & Eirik Søfteland.

• Fredric Brunberg | Season 12, 13, & 14 | Kristin Størmer Steira, Jorun Stiansen, & Martine Lunde.

• Lillian Aasebø | Season 12, 13, 14, 15, 16 & 17 | Roger Ruud, Erik Follestad, Aleksander Sæterstøl, Adrian Sellevoll, Fred Buljo, & Dennis Vareide.

• Maria Lie Ramella | Season 16 & 17 | Øystein Lihaug Solberg & Alejandro Fuentes.

• Philip Raabe | Season 16, 17 & 18 | Birgit Skarstein, Maren Lundby, & Victor Sotberg.

== See also ==
- Dancing with the Stars (United States)
- Strictly Come Dancing
