= Idol (Norwegian TV series) season 4 =

Idol
- Season 4
- Hosted by: Solveig Kloppen; Kåre Magnus Bergh
- Judges: Tone-Lise Skagefoss; Tor Milde; Amund Bjørklund; Hans Olav Grøttheim
- Winner: Aleksander Denstad With
- Runner-up: Jonas Thomassen
- Finals venue: Oslo Spektrum

Release
- Original network: TV 2
- Original release: January 2006 – May 19, 2006

Season chronology
- ← Previous; Season 3 Next → Season 5

Idol: Jakten på en superstjerne 2006 was the fourth season of Idol Norway based on the British singing competition Pop Idol. It premiered one year after the third season and was aired in the first half of 2006.
Kåre Magnus Bergh remained as the co-host of Solveig Kloppen who was pregnant during the show. Between March 3 and April 27 she was replaced by the following (in order of appearance): Berte Rommetveit, Guri Solberg, Sandra Lyng Haugen, Marion Ravn and Silje Stang who each hosted one show next to Bergh. Tone-Lise Skagefoss and Tor Milde remained as judges and were joined by Amund Bjørklund and Hans Olav Grøttheim.
Aleksander Denstad With auditioned with his girlfriend Vivian Sørmeland. The two of them were lead singers of the unsigned project WimpyLine. Both managed to advance through the semifinals to the top 12 and while Sørmeland placed third her boyfriend Width went on winning the entire show making him the youngest winner of the show (he was 18 at that time). Peaking at no. 4 in Norway, first album coming home also managed to become a success in Japan.

== Finals ==
=== Finalists ===
(ages stated at time of contest)

Contestant	Age	Hometown	Voted Off	Liveshow Theme
Aleksander Denstad With	18	Trondheim	Winner	Grand Finale
Jonas Thomassen	17	Rygge	May 19, 2006	Grand Finale
Vivian Sørmeland	19	Trondheim	May 12, 2006	Judge's choice
Marita Johansen	17	Tromsø	May 05, 2006	Duets
Wisnu Witono Adhi	22	Oslo	Apr 28, 2006	Big Band
Ørjan Hatlevik	22	Fitjar	Apr 21, 2005	Made in Sweden
Siri Helene Erland	20	Skaun	Apr 07, 2006	1980s
Siri Helene Erland	20	Skaun	Mar 03, 2006	Contestant's choice
Oda Evjen Gjøvåg	17	Bergen	Mar 31, 2006	Unplugged
Stine Hansen	17	Skedsmokorset	Mar 24, 2006	Made in Norway
Anders Mjaaland	17	Kristiansand	Mar 17, 2006	Disco Fever
Iselin Andresen	18	Haugesund	Withdrew	
Audun Rensel	19	Tromøya	Mar 10, 2006	Movie Songs

== Elimination Chart ==
Legend
Did Not Perform	Female	Male	Top 40	Wild Card	Top 12	Winner

Safe	Bottom 3	Bottom 2	Eliminated

Stage:		Semi					Wild; Card	Finals										
Week:		02/08	02/10	02/16	02/18	02/22	02/24	03/03	03/10	03/17	03/31	04/07	04/14	04/21	04/28	05/05	05/12	05/19
Place	Contestant	Result																
1	Aleksander Denstad With					56%						Btm 3						Winner
2	Jonas Thomassen	42%																Runner-Up
3	Vivian Sørmeland		40%											Btm 3		Btm 2	Elim	
4	Marita Johansen			18%			40%						Btm 3	Btm 2	Btm 2	Elim		
5	Wisnu Witono Adhi					10%				Btm 3	Btm 3		Btm 2		Elim			
6	Ørjan Hatlevik		41%											Elim				
7	Siri Helene Erland			19%				Elim				Btm 2	Elim					
8	Oda Evjen Gjøvåg				28%			Btm 3	Btm 2	Btm 2	Btm 2	Elim						
9	Stine Hansen				21%						Elim							
10	Anders Mjaaland	16%								Elim								
11	Audun Rensel				17%		14%	Btm 2	Elim									
12	Iselin Andresen			24%					Wdrw									
Wild; Card	Melanie Helmichsen			Elim			12%											
Wild; Card	Yolanda Myrbostad	11%					10%											
Wild; Card	Cindy Selven Røe					8%	Elim											
Wild; Card	Mari Steinnes		4%				Elim											
Wild; Card	Maria Holand Tøsse	12%					Elim											
Wild; Card	Quang Tran Trung		Elim				Elim											
Semi- Final 5	Stine Muri					9%												
Semi- Final 5	Johan Sørum					Elim												
Semi- Final 5	Kim Dahl					Elim												
Semi- Final 5	Maria Medina Heskestad					Elim												
Semi- Final 5	Matias Kildahl Fjeld					Elim												
Semi- Final 4	Marius Hildal Vik				10%													
Semi- Final 4	Ivar Ole Vik				Elim													
Semi- Final 4	Mariann Svendsen				Elim													
Semi- Final 4	Vegard Dahl				Elim													
Semi- Final 4	Veronika J. Klemetsen				Elim													
Semi- Final 3	Cindy E. Kvinlaug			17%														
Semi- Final 3	Anthony Hegglund Sabado			Elim														
Semi- Final 3	Bob Mørk			Elim														
Semi- Final 3	Ole Jørgen Gravaas			Elim														
Semi- Final 2	Sara Ristesund		4%															
Semi- Final 2	Christine Valencia		Elim															
Semi- Final 2	Solveig Nymoen		Elim															
Semi- Final 2	Thomas Seeberg		Elim															
Semi- Final 1	Bente Tednes	Elim																
Semi- Final 1	Flavio Diaz	Elim																
Semi- Final 1	Gabrielle Leithaug	Elim																
Semi- Final 1	Leif H. T. Pettersen	Elim																

Notes:

- Because Iselin withdrew after the second liveshow Siri Helene returned as her replacement after Audun (who was voted off the latest at that point) declined.

=== Live show details ===
==== Heat 1 (8 February 2006) ====
Order	Artist	Song (original artists)	Result
1	Gabrielle Leithaug	"Sisters Are Doin' It for Themselves" (Annie Lennox & Aretha Franklin)	Eliminated
2	Leif H. T. Pettersen	"The Scientist" (Coldplay)	Eliminated
3	Maria Holand Tøsse	"A Whole New World" (Peabo Bryson & Regina Belle)	Eliminated
4	Flavio Diaz	"Drops of Jupiter (Tell Me)" (Train)	Eliminated
5	Bente Tednes	"How Come U Don't Call Me Anymore?" (Alicia Keys)	Eliminated
6	Jonas Thomassen	"Hurt" (Johnny Cash)	Advanced
7	Yolanda Myrbostad	"A Thousand Miles" (Vanessa Carlton)	Eliminated
8	Anders Mjaaland	"Dreams" (Gavin DeGraw)	Advanced

Notes

- Jonas Thomassen and Anders Mjaaland advanced to the top 12 of the competition. The other 6 contestants were eliminated.
- Maria Holand Tøsse and Yolanda Myrbostad returned for a second chance at the top 12 in the Wildcard Round.

==== Heat 2 (10 February 2006) ====
Order	Artist	Song (original artists)	Result
1	Sara Ristesund	"Ironic" (Alanis Morissette)	Eliminated
2	Christine Valencia Kjøsnes	"Can't Take My Eyes Off You" (Frankie Valli)	Eliminated
3	Quang Tran Trung	"You and Me" (Lifehouse)	Eliminated
4	Thomas Seeberg	"Easy" (Commodores)	Eliminated
5	Solveig Nymoen	"Stop!" (Sam Brown)	Eliminated
6	Mari Steinnes	"Big Mistake" (Natalie Imbruglia)	Eliminated
7	Vivian Sørmeland	"Foolish Games" (Jewel)	Advanced
8	Ørjan Hatlevik	"Birthright" (A-ha)	Advanced

Notes

- Ørjan Hatlevik and Vivian Sørmeland advanced to the top 12 of the competition. The other 6 contestants were eliminated.
- Quang Tran Trung and Mari Steinnes returned for a second chance at the top 12 in the Wildcard Round.

==== Heat 3 (16 February 2006) ====
Order	Artist	Song (original artists)	Result
1	Melanie Helmichsen	"Super Duper Love" (Joss Stone)	Eliminated
2	Ole Jørgen Gravaas	"This Love" (Maroon 5)	Eliminated
3	Cindy E. Kvinlaug	"Just Like Jesse James" (Cher)	Eliminated
4	Marita Johansen	"Tir n'a Noir" (Vamp)	Eliminated
5	Anthony Hegglund Sabado	"He Ain't Heavy, He's My Brother" (The Hollies)	Eliminated
6	Iselin Andresen	"Nine Million Bicycles" (Katie Melua)	Advanced
7	Siri Helene Erland	"Fix You" (Coldplay)	Advanced
8	Bob Mørk	"Bad Day" (Daniel Powter)	Eliminated

Notes

- Iselin Andresen and Siri Helene Erland advanced to the top 12 of the competition. The other 6 contestants were eliminated.
- Melanie Helmichsen and Marita Johansen returned for a second chance at the top 12 in the Wildcard Round.

==== Heat 4 (18 February 2006) ====
Order	Artist	Song (original artists)	Result
1	Mariann Svendsen	"A Woman's Worth" (Alicia Keys)	Eliminated
2	Marius Hildal Vik	"She Will Be Loved" (Maroon 5)	Eliminated
3	Veronika J. Klemetsen	"Burn for You" (John Farnham)	Eliminated
4	Audun Rensel	"If You're Not the One" (Daniel Bedingfield)	Eliminated
5	Ivar Ole Wik	"Love is a Matter of Distance" (Will Young)	Eliminated
6	Stine Hansen	"Think Twice" (Celine Dion)	Advanced
7	Vegard Dahl	"Never Again" (Justin Timberlake)	Eliminated
8	Oda Evjen Gjøvåg	"Smooth" (Santana & Rob Thomas)	Advanced

Notes

- Oda Evjen Gjøvåg and Stine Hansen advanced to the top 12 of the competition. The other 6 contestants were eliminated.
- Audun Rensel returned for a second chance at the top 12 in the Wildcard Round.

==== Heat 5 (22 February 2006) ====
Order	Artist	Song (original artists)	Result
1	Johan Sørum	"Wonderwall" (Oasis)	Eliminated
2	Kim Dahl	"Heaven" (Bryan Adams)	Eliminated
3	Wisnu Witono Adhi	"Follow Through" (Gavin DeGraw)	Advanced
4	Cindy Selven Røe	"Breakaway" (Kelly Clarkson)	Eliminated
5	Matias Kildahl Fjeld	"Stuck in a Moment You Can't Get Out Of" (U2)	Eliminated
6	Stine Muri	"Hallelujah" (Leonard Cohen)	Eliminated
7	Aleksander Denstad With	"Chariot" (Gavin DeGraw)	Advanced
8	Maria Medina Heskestad	"The Closest Thing to Crazy" (Katie Melua)	Eliminated

Notes

- Aleksander Denstad With and Wisnu Witono Adhi advanced to the top 12 of the competition. The other 6 contestants were eliminated.
- Cindy Selven Røe returned for a second chance at the top 12 in the Wildcard Round.

==== Wildcard round (24 February 2006) ====
Order	Artist	Song (original artists)	Result
1	Mari Steinnes	"I'm with You" (Avril Lavigne)	Eliminated
2	Maria Holand Tøsse	"A Whole New World" (Peabo Bryson & Regina Belle)	Eliminated
3	Melanie Helmichsen	"(You Make Me Feel Like) A Natural Woman" (Aretha Franklin)	Eliminated
4	Quang Tran Trung	"Kiss from a Rose" (Seal)	Eliminated
5	Cindy Selven Røe	"Fields of Gold" (Sting)	Eliminated
6	Marita Johansen	"Desperado" (Eagles)	Advanced
7	Audun Rensel	"When You Say Nothing at All" (Ronan Keating)	Advanced
8	Yolanda Myrbostad	"Stickwitu" (The Pussycat Dolls)	Eliminated

Notes

- Marita Johansen and Audun Rensel received the highest number of votes, and completed the top 12.

==== Live Show 1 (3 March 2006) ====
Theme: Your Idol

Order	Artist	Song (original artists)	Result
1	Oda Evjen Gjøvåg	"Trick Me" (Kelis)	Bottom three
2	Anders Mjaaland	"Advertising Space" (Robbie Williams)	Safe
3	Stine Hansen	"You Had Me" (Joss Stone)	Safe
4	Audun Rensel	"The Reason" (Hoobastank)	Bottom two
5	Vivian Sørmeland	"Joe Dallesandro" (Briskeby)	Safe
6	Wisnu Witono Adhi	"U Remind Me" (Usher)	Safe
7	Siri Helene Erland	"Fragile (Free)" (Maria Mena)	Eliminated
8	Ørjan Hatlevik	"In My Place" (Coldplay)	Safe
9	Iselin Andresen	"Don't Save Me" (Marit Larsen)	Safe
10	Aleksander Denstad With	"Trouble" (Coldplay)	Safe
11	Marita Johansen	"Another Day in Paradise" (Phil Collins)	Safe
12	Jonas Thomassen	"Smooth" (Santana & Rob Thomas)	Safe

==== Live Show 2 (10 March 2006) ====
Theme: Movie Songs

Order	Artist	Song (original artists)	Result
1	Jonas Thomassen	"Iris" (Goo Goo Dolls)	Safe
2	Iselin Andresen	"Embrace Me" (Karen Jo Fields)	Bottom three
3	Wisnu Witono Adhi	"His Eye Is on the Sparrow" (Lauryn Hill & Tanya Blount)	Safe
4	Marita Johansen	"You've Got a Way" (Shania Twain)	Safe
5	Aleksander Denstad With	"American Woman" (Lenny Kravitz)	Safe
6	Audun Rensel	"You Are So Beautiful" (Joe Cocker)	Eliminated
7	Stine Hansen	"Please Remember" (LeAnn Rimes)	Safe
8	Ørjan Hatlevik	"Wherever You Will Go" (The Calling)	Safe
9	Oda Evjen Gjøvåg	"Pure Shores" (All Saints)	Bottom two
10	Anders Mjaaland	"She" (Elvis Costello)	Safe
11	Vivian Sørmeland	"Respect" (Aretha Franklin)	Safe

==== Live Show 3 (17 March 2006) ====
Theme: Disco

Order	Artist	Song (original artists)	Result
N/A	Iselin Andresen	N/A	Withdrew
1	Vivian Sørmeland	"I Want You Back" (The Jackson 5)	Safe
2	Anders Mjaaland	"Celebration" (Kool & the Gang)	Eliminated
3	Oda Evjen Gjøvåg	"I'm So Excited" (The Pointer Sisters)	Bottom two
4	Aleksander Denstad With	"Have Fun, Go Mad" (Blair)	Safe
5	Marita Johansen	"Hung Up" (Madonna)	Safe
6	Jonas Thomassen	"Relight My Fire" (Dan Hartman)	Safe
7	Stine Hansen	"Car Wash" (Rose Royce)	Safe
8	Wisnu Witono Adhi	"You to Me Are Everything" (The Real Thing)	Bottom three
9	Siri Helene Erland	"I Will Survive" (Gloria Gaynor)	Safe
10	Ørjan Hatlevik	"Play That Funky Music" (Wild Cherry)	Safe

==== Live Show 4 (31 March 2006) ====
Theme: Made in Norway

Order	Artist	Song (original artists)	Result
1	Stine Hansen	"Everything" (M2M)	Eliminated
2	Wisnu Witono Adhi	"Won't Go Near You Again" (Unni Wilhelmsen)	Bottom three
3	Marita Johansen	"En natt forbi" (Jan Eggum)	Safe
4	Ørjan Hatlevik	"Going Down That Lonely Road" (Jim Stärk)	Safe
5	Vivian Sørmeland	"Love Explains It All" (Venke Knutson)	Safe
6	Aleksander Denstad With	"Unloved" (Espen Lind)	Safe
7	Oda Evjen Gjøvåg	"Just Hold Me" (Maria Mena)	Bottom two
8	Jonas Thomassen	"Splitter pine" (DumDum Boys)	Safe
9	Siri Helene Erland	"Lady of My Life" (Maria Solheim)	Safe

==== Live Show 5 (7 April 2006) ====
Theme: Unplugged

Order	Artist	Song (original artists)	Result
1	Jonas Thomassen	"The River" (Bruce Springsteen)	Safe
2	Oda Evjen Gjøvåg	"Emotion" (Samantha Sang)	Eliminated
3	Siri Helene Erland	"Anything About June" (Unni Wilhelmsen)	Bottom two
4	Aleksander Denstad With	"I Don't Want to Be" (Gavin DeGraw)	Bottom three
5	Marita Johansen	"Sunrise" (Norah Jones)	Safe
6	Wisnu Witono Adhi	"Let's Get It On" (Marvin Gaye)	Safe
7	Ørjan Hatlevik	"Creep" (Radiohead)	Safe
8	Vivian Sørmeland	"Nothing Else Matters" (Metallica)	Safe

==== Live Show 6 (14 April 2006) ====
Theme: 1980s

Order	Artist	Song (original artists)	Result
1	Marita Johansen	"I Love Rock 'n' Roll" (Joan Jett)	Bottom three
2	Wisnu Witono Adhi	"Faith" (George Michael)	Bottom two
3	Ørjan Hatlevik	"Dancing in the Dark" (Bruce Springsteen)	Safe
4	Vivian Sørmeland	"First Time" (Robin Beck)	Safe
5	Jonas Thomassen	"Livin' on a Prayer" (Bon Jovi)	Safe
6	Siri Helene Erland	"Where the Streets Have No Name" (U2)	Eliminated
7	Aleksander Denstad With	"The Way You Make Me Feel" (Michael Jackson)	Safe

==== Live Show 7 (21 April 2006) ====
Theme: Made in Sweden

Order	Artist	Song (original artists)	Result
1	Ørjan Hatlevik	"Max 500" (Kent)	Eliminated
2	Jonas Thomassen	"Balladen om herr Fredrik Åkare och den söta fröken Cecilia Lind" (Cornelis Vreeswijk)	Safe
3	Vivian Sørmeland	"The Winner Takes It All" (ABBA)	Bottom three
4	Marita Johansen	"Communication" (The Cardigans)	Bottom two
5	Aleksander Denstad With	"Glorious" (Andreas Johnson)	Safe
6	Wisnu Witono Adhi	"Never Be Afraid Again" (Christian Walz)	Safe

==== Live Show 8 (28 April 2006) ====
Theme: Big Band

Order	Artist	Song (original artists)	Result
1	Wisnu Witono Adhi	"Sway" (Dean Martin)	Eliminated
2	Marita Johansen	"Fever" (Peggy Lee)	Bottom two
3	Aleksander Denstad With	"Spider-Man Theme" (Michael Bublé)	Safe
4	Vivian Sørmeland	"Big Spender" (Shirley Bassey)	Safe
5	Jonas Thomassen	"You'll Never Walk Alone" (Christine Johnson)	Safe

==== Live Show 9 (5 May 2006) ====
Theme: Duets

Order	Artist	Song (original artists)	Result
1	Jonas Thomassen	"Born to Be Wild" (Steppenwolf)	Safe
2	Vivian Sømeland	"Because of You" (Kelly Clarkson)	Bottom two
3	Marita Johansen	"Against All Odds (Take a Look at Me Now)" (Phil Collins)	Eliminated
4	Aleksander Denstad With	"Everybody Hurts" (R.E.M.)	Safe
5	Jonas Thomassen & Marita Johansen	"Where the Wild Roses Grow" (Nick Cave & Kylie Minogue)	N/A
6	Aleksander Denstad With & Vivian Sømeland	"One" (U2 & Mary J. Blige)	N/A

==== Live Show 10: Semi-final (12 May 2006) ====
Theme: Judge's Choice

Order	Artist	First song (original artists)	Second song	Result
1	Vivian Sørmeland	"Since U Been Gone" (Kelly Clarkson)	"Nothing Compares 2 U" (Sinéad O'Connor)	Eliminated
2	Jonas Thomassen	"Lonely No More" (Rob Thomas)	"Behind Blue Eyes" (Limp Bizkit)	Safe
3	Aleksander Denstad With	"I've Been Losing You" (A-ha)	"Kiss from a Rose" (Seal)	Safe

==== Live final (19 May 2006) ====
Order	Artist	First song	Second song	Third song	Result
1	Jonas Thomassen	"Iris"	"White Wedding"	"A Little Too Perfect"	Runner-up
2	Aleksander Denstad With	"Glorious"	"Kiss from a Rose"	"A Little Too Perfect"	Winner
