= Idol (Norwegian TV series) season 5 =

Season of television series

Idol
- Season 5
- Hosted by: Marte Stokstad; Kyrre Holm Johannessen
- Judges: Jan Fredrik Karlsen; Asbjørn Slettemark; Benedicte Adrian; Mariann Thomassen
- Winner: Glenn Lyse
- Runner-up: Bjørn Johan Muri
- Finals venue: Oslo Spektrum

Release
- Original network: TV 2
- Original release: September 7 – December 21, 2007

Season chronology
- ← Previous; Season 4 Next → Season 6

Idol: Jakten på en superstjerne 2007 was the fifth season of Idol Norway based on the British singing competition Pop Idol. In difference to other seasons it was aired in the second half of the year running from September to December 2007.
After a two-year absence Jan Fredrik Karlsen returned to the judging panel as the foreperson. He was joined by Asbjørn Slettemark, Benedicte Adrian and Mariann Thomassen. Also the two hosts were new to the show in person of Marte Stokstad and Kyrre Holm Johannessen.
The Age limit to audition was raised from 28 to 35. Eventual winner Glenn Lyse profited from that rule as he was 33 at the time of his win which also made him the oldest winner of the Idol series worldwide. Lyse beat Bjørn Johan Muri, who was half his age (17), at the final with 56%. However, in a long run the runner-up once again proved to be more successful: In 2010, Muri took part in the Norwegian qualification for the Eurovision Song Contest 2010, with the song "Yes Man". Here he qualified for the final, where he finished fourth overall. Despite that, the single still became a #1 hit in Norway.

== Finals ==
=== Finalists ===
(ages stated at time of contest)

Contestant	Age	Hometown	Voted Off	Liveshow Theme
Glenn Lyse	34	Stavanger	Winner	Grand Finale
Bjørn Johan Muri	17	Ålesund	December 21, 2007	Grand Finale
Kim Rune Hagen	17	Heddal	December 14, 2007	Judge's choice
Åste Hunnes Sem	33	Heddal	December 07, 2007	Christmas / Duets
Timian Ripnes Naastad	16	Kristiansund	November 30, 2007	Big Band
Linda Steen	17	Porsgrunn	November 23, 2007	Country / Unplugged
Linnea Dale	16	Tinn	November 15, 2007	A-Ha
Marius Barhaugen	21	Årnes	November 9, 2007	Dedicated to
Isabella Leroy	24	Tønsberg	November 2, 2007	Disco Fever
Anne Riyah Roalkvam	19	Stavanger	October 26, 2007	Contestant's choice

== Elimination chart ==
Legend
Did Not Perform	Female	Male	Top 24	Wild Card	Top 10	Winner

Safe	Bottom 3	Bottom 2	Eliminated

Stage:		Semi				Wild; Card	Finals								
Week:		10/05	10/10	10/12	10/17	10/19	10/26	11/02	11/09	11/15	11/23	11/30	12/07	12/14	12/21
Place	Contestant	Result													
1	Glenn Lyse		2nd									Btm 3			Winner
2	Bjørn Johan Muri	22%											Btm 2		Runner-Up
3	Kim Rune Hagen			35%								Btm 2		Elim	
4	Åste Hunnes Sem			Elim		44%					Btm 3		Elim		
5	Timian Naastad		1st						Btm 2	Btm 3	Btm 2	Elim			
6	Linda Steen				44%			Btm 3		Btm 2	Elim				
7	Linnea Dale		Elim			2nd			Btm 3	Elim					
8	Marius Barhaugen				2nd			Btm 2	Elim						
9	Isabella Leroy	35%						Elim							
10	Anne Roelkvam			22%			Elim								
Wild; Card	Anne Lene Nordbø	Elim				Elim									
Wild; Card	Anne Sophie Andresen		Elim			Elim									
Wild; Card	Lisa Johnsen Scheldrup		Elim			Elim									
Wild; Card	Sindre Dybvikstrand			Elim		Elim									
Semi- Final 4	Christian Knutli				Elim										
Semi- Final 4	Marita Gjelten Jensen				Elim										
Semi- Final 4	Miriam Mercedes				Elim										
Semi- Final 4	Nanna Wanjera Christensen				Elim										
Semi- Final 3	Ingunn Jaabæk			Elim											
Semi- Final 3	Martin Jæger			Elim											
Semi 2	Morten Remberg		Elim												
Semi- Final 1	Bent Andreas Lundby	Elim													
Semi- Final 1	Lene Sæther	Elim													
Semi- Final 1	Thomas Gregersen	Elim													

=== Live show details ===
==== Heat 1 (5 October 2007) ====
Order	Artist	Song (original artists)	Result
1	Lene Sæter	"The Closest Thing to Crazy" (Katie Melua)	Eliminated
2	Thomas Gregersen	"Follow Through" (Gavin DeGraw)	Eliminated
3	Bent Andreas Lundby	"Desperado" (Eagles)	Eliminated
4	Anne Lene Nordbø	"Ain't No Mountain High Enough" (Marvin Gaye & Tammi Terrell)	Eliminated
5	Bjørn-Johan Muri	"Angels" (Robbie Williams)	Advanced
6	Isabella Leroy	"My Heart Still Moves" (Isabella Leroy)	Advanced

Notes

- Isabella Leroy and Bjørn Johan Muri advanced to the top 10 of the competition. The other 4 contestants were eliminated.
- Anne Lene Nordbø returned for a second chance at the top 10 in the Wildcard Round.

==== Heat 2 (10 October 2007) ====
Order	Artist	Song (original artists)	Result
1	Anne-Sophie Endresen	"Listen" (Beyoncé Knowles)	Eliminated
2	Glenn Lyse	"Crazy" (Gnarls Barkley)	Advanced
3	Morten Remberg	"Don't Let the Sun Go Down on Me" (Elton John)	Eliminated
4	Linnea Dale	"What Do I Know About Love" (Linnea Dale)	Eliminated
5	Lisa J. Schjelderup	"Hurt" (Christina Aguilera)	Eliminated
6	Timian Naastad	"Wakeup Call" (Timian Naastad)	Advanced

Notes

- Timian Naastad and Glenn Lyse advanced to the top 10 of the competition. The other 4 contestants were eliminated.
- Anne Sophie Andresen, Linnea Dale and Lisa J. Schjelderup returned for a second chance at the top 10 in the Wildcard Round.

==== Heat 3 (12 October 2007) ====
Order	Artist	Song (original artists)	Result
1	Åste Hunnes Sem	"I Can't Make You Love Me" (Bonnie Raitt)	Eliminated
2	Sindre Dybvikstrand	"I'm Yours" (Jason Mraz)	Eliminated
3	Ingunn Jaabæk	"Because of You" (Kelly Clarkson)	Eliminated
4	Martin Jæger	"Here Without You" (3 Doors Down)	Eliminated
5	Anne Roalkvam	"Soulmate" (Natasha Bedingfield)	Advanced
6	Kim Rune Hagen	"Billie Jean" (Michael Jackson)	Advanced

Notes

- Kim Rune Hagen and Anne Roalkvam advanced to the top 10 of the competition. The other 4 contestants were eliminated.
- Åste Hunnes Sem and Sindre Dybvikstrand returned for a second chance at the top 10 in the Wildcard Round.

==== Heat 4 (17 October 2007) ====
Order	Artist	Song (original artists)	Result
1	Miriam Mercedes	"Brazen (Weep)" (Skunk Anansie)	Eliminated
2	Christian Knutli	"This Love" (Maroon 5)	Eliminated
3	Marita Jensen	"Black Velvet" (Alannah Myles)	Eliminated
4	Marius Barhaugen	"Chariot" (Gavin DeGraw)	Advanced
5	Nanna Wanjera Christensen	"How Will I Know" (Whitney Houston)	Eliminated
6	Linda Steen	"A Woman's Worth" (Alicia Keys)	Advanced

Notes

- Linda Steen and Marius Barhaugen advanced to the top 10 of the competition. The other 4 contestants were eliminated.
- None of the contestants from this round made it into the Wildcard Round, making it the only group to not be represented at that stage.

==== Wildcard round (19 October 2007) ====
Order	Artist	Song (original artists)	Result
1	Sindre Dybvikstrand	"Manhattan Skyline" (A-ha)	Eliminated
2	Anne Lene Nordbø	"Shackles (Praise You)" (Mary Mary)	Eliminated
3	Anne-Sophie Endresen	"Alone" (Heart)	Eliminated
4	Linnea Dale	"Yellow" (Coldplay)	Advanced
5	Lisa J. Schjelderup	"Who Knew" (Pink)	Eliminated
6	Åste Hunnes Sem	"Survivor" (Destiny's Child)	Advanced

Notes

- Åste Hunnes Sem and Linnea Dale received the highest number of votes, and completed the top 10.

==== Live Show 1 (26 October 2007) ====
Theme: Contestant's Choice

Order	Artist	Song (original artists)	Result
1	Anne Roalkvam	"Sir Duke" (Stevie Wonder)	Eliminated
2	Timian Naastad	"Yesterday" (The Beatles)	Safe
3	Glenn Lyse	"Here I Go Again" (Whitesnake)	Safe
4	Linnea Dale	"Both Sides, Now" (Joni Mitchell)	Safe
5	Marius Barhaugen	"Don't Dream It's Over" (Crowded House)	Safe
6	Åste Hunnes Sem	"Saving All My Love for You" (Whitney Houston)	Safe
7	Isabella Leroy	"You Oughta Know" (Alanis Morissette)	Safe
8	Bjørn Johan Muri	"Everything" (Michael Bublé)	Safe
9	Kim Rune Hagen	"Burnin'" (Cue)	Safe
10	Linda Steen	"Underneath Your Clothes" (Shakira)	Safe

==== Live Show 2 (2 November 2007) ====
Theme: Disco Fever

Order	Artist	Song (original artists)	Result
1	Glenn Lyse	"Stayin' Alive" (Bee Gees)	Safe
2	Marius Barhaugen	"Celebration" (Kool & the Gang)	Bottom two
3	Linnea Dale	"Murder on the Dancefloor" (Sophie Ellis-Bextor)	Safe
4	Linda Steen	"Flashdance... What a Feeling" (Irene Cara)	Bottom three
5	Bjørn Johan Muri	"Sex Bomb" (Tom Jones)	Safe
6	Isabella Leroy	"Rock with You" (Michael Jackson)	Eliminated
7	Kim Rune Hagen	"I Was Made for Lovin' You" (Kiss)	Safe
8	Timian Naastad	"September" (Earth, Wind & Fire)	Safe
9	Åste Hunnes Sem	"Blame It on the Boogie" (The Jacksons)	Safe

==== Live Show 3 (9 November 2007) ====
Theme: Dedicated to

Order	Artist	Song (original artists)	Result
1	Marius Barhaugen	"Fly Away" (Lenny Kravitz)	Eliminated
2	Åste Hunnes Sem	"Calling You" (Jevetta Steele)	Safe
3	Linnea Dale	"So Alive" (Ryan Adams)	Bottom three
4	Kim Rune Hagen	"Livin' on a Prayer" (Bon Jovi)	Safe
5	Timian Naastad	"Beauty of My Mind" (Timian Naastad)	Bottom two
6	Glenn Lyse	"You Know My Name" (Chris Cornell)	Safe
7	Linda Steen	"Don't Speak" (No Doubt)	Safe
8	Bjørn Johan Muri	"New Shoes" (Paolo Nutini)	Safe

==== Live Show 4 (16 November 2007) ====
Theme: A-ha

Order	Artist	Song	Result
1	Kim Rune Hagen	"Summer Moved On"	Safe
2	Timian Naastad	"Crying in the Rain"	Bottom three
3	Åste Hunnes Sem	"Hunting High and Low"	Safe
4	Bjørn Johan Muri	"Birthright"	Safe
5	Linnea Dale	"Velvet"	Eliminated
6	Linda Steen	"Stay on These Roads"	Bottom two
7	Glenn Lyse	"The Sun Always Shines on T.V."	Safe

==== Live Show 5 (23 November 2007) ====
Theme: Country/Unplugged

Order	Artist	Song	Result
1	Linda Steen	"Let It Rain" (Amanda Marshall)	Eliminated
2	Bjørn Johan Muri	"Somebody Like You" (Keith Urban)	Safe
3	Timian Naastad	"When You Say Nothing at All" (Ronan Keating)	Bottom two
4	Glenn Lyse	"Man of Constant Sorrow" (Dick Burnett)	Safe
5	Åste Hunnes Sem	"Always on My Mind" (Willie Nelson)	Bottom three
6	Kim Rune Hagen	"Ei krasafaren steinbu" (Hellbillies)	Safe

==== Live Show 6 (30 November 2007) ====
Theme: Big Band

Order	Artist	Song	Result
1	Glenn Lyse	"Wonderwall" (Oasis)	Bottom three
2	Åste Hunnes Sem	"And I Am Telling You I'm Not Going" (Jennifer Holliday)	Safe
3	Kim Rune Hagen	"Moondance" (Van Morrison)	Bottom two
4	Timian Naastad	"Fly Me to the Moon" (Frank Sinatra)	Eliminated
5	Bjørn Johan Muri	"I Get a Kick Out of You" (Frank Sinatra)	Safe

==== Live Show 7 (7 December 2007) ====
Theme: Christmas Songs & Duets

Order	Artist	Song (original artists)	Result
1	Åste Hunnes Sem	"All I Want for Christmas Is You" (Mariah Carey)	Eliminated
2	Kim Rune Hagen	"O helga natt" (Various artists)	Safe
3	Bjørn Johan Muri	"Let It Snow! Let It Snow! Let It Snow!" (Dean Martin)	Bottom two
4	Glenn Lyse	"Christmas (Baby Please Come Home)" (U2)	Safe
5	Åste Hunnes Sem & Glenn Lyse	"Help!" (The Beatles)	N/A
6	Kim Rune Hagen & Bjørn Johan Muri	"Kids" (Robbie Williams & Kylie Minogue)	N/A

==== Live Show 8: Semi-final (14 December 2007) ====
Theme: Judge's Choice

Order	Artist	First song (original artists)	Second song	Result
1	Glenn Lyse	"Dancing in the Dark" (Bruce Springsteen)	"Cries Like a Baby" (The September When)	Safe
2	Kim Rune Hagen	"Hard to Handle" (Otis Redding)	"Patience" (Guns N' Roses)	Eliminated
3	Bjørn Johan Muri	"Used to Love U" (John Legend)	"True Colors" (Phil Collins)	Safe

==== Live final (21 December 2007) ====
Order	Artist	First song	Second song	Third song	Result
1	Bjørn Johan Muri	"In My Place"	"New Shoes"	"Days Go By"	Runner-up
2	Glenn Lyse	"Purple Rain"	"Here I Go Again"	"Days Go By"	Winner
