= Idol (Norwegian TV series) season 6 =

Idol
- Season 6
- Hosted by: Guri Solberg, Christian "Ravi" Johansen
- Judges: Bertine Zetlitz, Hans Erik Dyvik Husby, Marion Ravn, Gunnar Greve
- Winner: Jenny Langlo
- Runner-up: Vegard Leite
- Finals venue: Chateau Neuf

Release
- Original network: TV 2
- Original release: August 30 – December 16, 2011

Season chronology
- ← Previous; Season 5 Next → Season 7

Idol: Jakten på en superstjerne 2011 was the sixth season of Idol Norway based on the British singing competition Pop Idol. After a four years break, in which the broadcast station aired to X Factor seasons, the show returned to Norwegian screens on August 30.

The panel of judges consisted of 1990s pop star Bertine Zetlitz, musical composer Hans Erik Dyvik Husby, pop star Marion Ravn and artist manager Gunnar Greve. Ravi, who was hosting the second season of X Factor shared hosting duties with Guri Solberg. The age limit again was 16-35 and auditions were held in Oslo (April 18), Trondheim (May 9), Stavanger (May 16) and Bergen.

On December 16, Jenny Langlo won over Vegard Leite and became the second female contestant to win the show after Jorun Stiansen took home victory in Season 3 six years ago.

== Finals ==
=== Finalists ===
(ages stated at time of contest)

Contestant	Age	Hometown	Voted Off	Liveshow Theme
Jenny Langlo	18	Stordal	Winner	Grand Finale
Vegard Leite	19	Haugesund	December 16, 2011	Grand Finale
Isak Knutsen Heim	16	Trondheim	December 9, 2011	Judge's choice
Henrik Mortensen Aune	17	Mosjøen	December 2, 2011	Big Band
Kirsti Sørlie Hansen	25	Rælingen	November 25, 2011	Unplugged
Maria Mohn	28	Fredrikstad	November 18, 2011	Soundtracks
Fredrik Bergersen Klemp	21	Skedsmokorset	November 11, 2011	Norwegian Songs
Marlen Tjøsvoll	19	Karmøy	November 4, 2011	Dedicated to
Bianca Skoglie Lal	16	Fredrikstad	October 28, 2011	Childhood Songs
Christopher Olafsrud	17	Gjerdrum	October 21, 2011	Contestant's choice

== Elimination chart ==
Legend
Did Not Perform	Female	Male	Top 40	Top 10	Winner

Safe	Bottom 3	Bottom 2	Eliminated

Stage:		Semi					Finals								
Week:		09/16	09/23	09/30	10/07	10/14	10/21	10/28	11/04	11/11	11/18	11/25	12/02	12/09	12/16
Place	Contestant	Result													
1	Jenny Langlo				1st										Winner
2	Vegard Leite	1st													Runner-Up
3	Isak Knutsen Heim			1st					Btm 3			Btm 2	Btm 2	Elim	
4	Henrik Mortensen					1st					Btm 2		Elim		
5	Kirsti Sørlie Hansen				2nd			Btm 3		Btm 3		Elim			
6	Maria Mohn		2nd				Btm 3		Btm 3	Btm 3	Elim				
7	Fredrik Bergersen Klemp		1st							Elim					
8	Marlen Tjøsvoll	2nd						Btm 3	Elim						
9	Bianca Skoglie Lal			2nd			Btm 3	Elim							
10	Christopher Olafsrud					2nd	Elim								
Semi- Final 4	Hallvard Mostrøm					Elim									
Semi- Final 4	Johan Eriksson					Elim									
Semi- Final 4	Kim Erik Tolleshaug					Elim									
Semi- Final 4	Kristoffer Valkvæ					Elim									
Semi- Final 4	Rodao Garmiany					Elim									
Semi- Final 4	Sondre Johansen					Elim									
Semi- Final 4	Amanda Therese Goonetilleke				Elim										
Semi- Final 4	Evelyn Mercedes Kvambe				Elim										
Semi- Final 4	Hilde Osland				Elim										
Semi- Final 4	Kirsti Lucena Andersen				Elim										
Semi- Final 4	Shadi Christina Yazdani				Elim										
Semi- Final 4	Silje Grini				Elim										
Semi- Final 3	Eirik Balhald Brun-Svendsen			Elim											
Semi- Final 3	Hallgrim Nybø			Elim											
Semi- Final 3	Kjersti Tørresen			Elim											
Semi- Final 3	Magnus Bokn			Elim											
Semi- Final 3	Pål Dailey Christoffersen			Elim											
Semi- Final 3	Tønni Marie Leer			Elim											
Semi- Final 2	Bernt Johannes Smestad		Elim												
Semi- Final 2	Bjørn Viktor Giske		Elim												
Semi- Final 2	Fredrik Bertheussen Brurås		Elim												
Semi- Final 2	Jenny Marlene Nettum		Elim												
Semi- Final 2	Ragnhild Andersen		Elim												
Semi- Final 2	Simon Dankertsen		Elim												
Semi- Final 1	Alf Johannes Borge	Elim													
Semi- Final 1	Hanna Romøren	Elim													
Semi- Final 1	Karen Bernadino	Elim													
Semi- Final 1	Mino Rabenja	Elim													
Semi- Final 1	Pål Gunnar Asdal	Elim													
Semi- Final 1	Snorre Ryen Tøndel	Elim													
