= Marc Slutsky =

American drummer

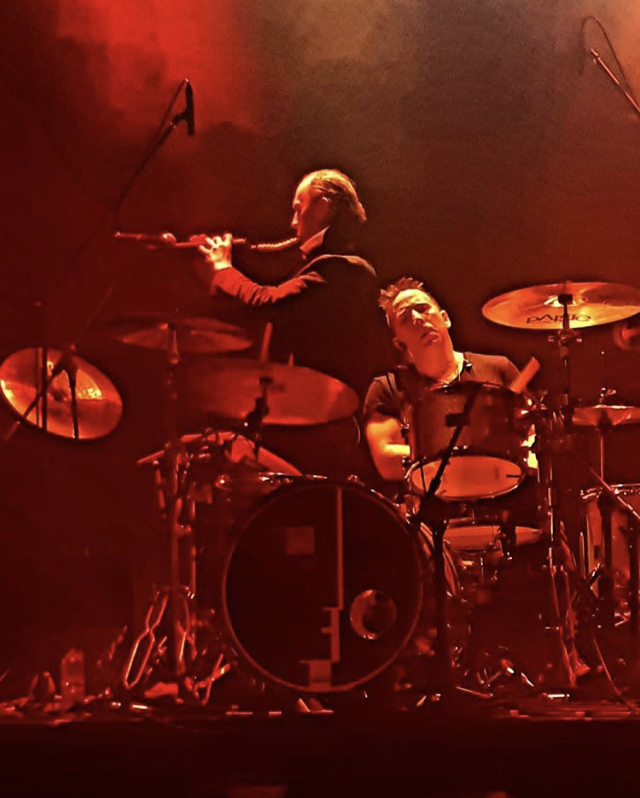
- Slutsky performing in 2018

Background information
- Born: Merrick, New York, U.S.
- Genres: Post-grunge; alternative rock; pop rock
- Occupation: Musician
- Instruments: Drums; percussion
- Labels: J; Columbia
- Formerly of: Splender
- Website: marcslutsky.com

Marc Slutsky is an American drummer and session musician. He was a founding member of alternative rock band Splender, which released Halfway Down the Sky in 1999 and To Whom It May Concern in 2002. His subsequent work has included touring and recording with Peter Murphy (Bauhaus), performing as one of two drummers with British pop icon Adam Ant on his 2024 Ant Music tour, and touring with The Calling, and record as a member of Sons of Silver. Slutsky also toured with support acts alongside Third Eye Blind, Vertical Horizon, Train, and the Goo Goo Dolls.

== Early life ==
Slutsky studied with Mike Abbott, Al Miller, and Dave Stark at the Long Island Drum Center. Slutsky then enrolled in the Manhattan School of Music in Manhattan, New York studying with the great jazz drummer and educator, John Riley. Slutsky transferred to SUNY Purchase College in Purchase, New York where he studied with Kim Plainfield. Slutsky received a Bachelor's of Fine Arts degree.

== Career ==
=== Splender ===
Slutsky was a founding member of alternative rock band Splender (1998–2003). The band recorded two albums; 1999's Halfway Down the Sky (Columbia Records) produced by Todd Rundgren, and To Whom it May Concern produced by Mark Endert on Clive Davis' J Records in 2001. The band had two hit singles "I think God Can Explain" and "Yeah Whatever".

=== Peter Murphy ===
Slutsky joined Peter Murphy in April 2018. His first performance with Murphy was on April 21, 2018, at Roxy Fest in Guadalajara, Mexico. Slutsky has worked extensively with Murphy including the "40 years of Bauhaus" Ruby World tour featuring David J. Slutsky appeared on the "Live in London" album which was recorded during the tour at Brixton Academy.

Slutsky collaborates with Peter Murphy, including tours and residency sessions around the world.

=== Adam Ant ===
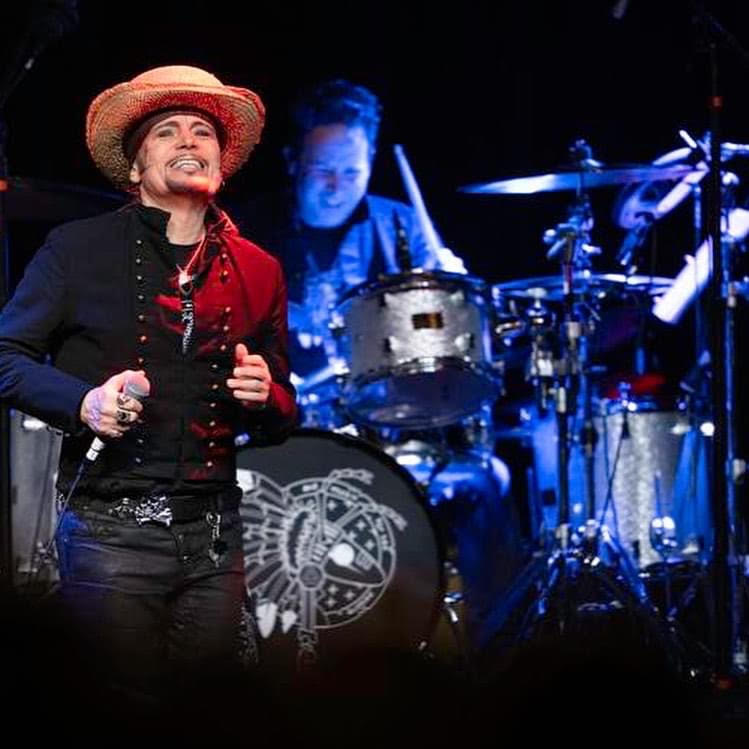
Slutksy on drums performing with Adam Ant on the "Ant Music 2024" U.S. tour

Slutsky joined Adam Ant's band as the drummer for the "Ant Music 2024" U.S. tour, which took place from March to May 2024. After the U.S. leg of the tour, he rejoined Ant for the UK segment of the Ant Music tour later in 2024.

=== Sons of Silver ===
Slutsky is a member of the Los Angeles rock band Sons of Silver. He performed on the group's debut studio album, Runaway Emotions, released in 2025.

=== The Calling ===
By 2025, Slutsky was touring as drummer with The Calling, performing on the band’s nine-date Brazilian tour that year. He continued touring with the group in 2026, including its four-city Philippine tour in February. Slutsky also appeared in the band’s official music video for its 2026 single “Dust”, from the forthcoming album Before the World Turns to Dust.

=== Session and other works ===
Slutsky has toured and/or recorded with these artists:

- Peter Murphy (Bauhaus)
- David J. (Love and Rockets, Bauhaus)
- Puddle of Mudd
- Tom Morello (Rage Against the Machine)
- Kylie Minogue
- Adam Ant
- Lou Gramm (Foreigner)
- Sons of Silver
- Mickey Thomas (Jefferson Starship)
- Todd Rundgren
- Kate Voegele
- Terri Nunn (Berlin)
- Tonic
- Delta Goodrem
- Alexa Ray Joel
- Cassadee Pope
- Grace Potter
- Hugo
- Korbee (Jenn Korbee)
- Drake Bell
- Robin McAuley (Survivor)
- Leland Sklar
- Pink
- John Elefante (Kansas)
- Curtis Peoples
- Steve Grand
- Lucía Parker
- Sabrina Carpenter
- Jim McGorman
- Ben Jelen
- Gavin DeGraw
- The Damnwells
- Kill the Alarm
- G. E. Smith (Saturday Night Live Band)
- Katie Herzig
- Ryan Star
- The Calling
- Peter Argyropoulos (Sons of Silver)

== In the press ==
Slutsky was interviewed by Modern Drummer in 2000. (Archived) In March 2026, he appeared on episode 559 of the Working Drummer podcast, where he discussed international touring, his work with Peter Murphy and Splender, working with Todd Rundgren, his approach to practising and studio recording.

== Kit configuration ==
Slutsky endorses:

- Pork Pie Drums
- Paiste cymbals
- Remo heads
- Vater Percussion Drun Sticks
