= I Choose You (Sara Bareilles song) =

Single by Sara Bareilles

from the album The Blessed Unrest
- Released: January 17, 2014
- Studio: House of Blues Studios (Encino, CA); Indian River Studios (Florida); Sunset Sound (Hollywood, CA)
- Genre: Indie pop
- Length: 3:39
- Label: Epic
- Songwriters: Sara Bareilles; Jason Blynn; Pete Harper
- Producer: Mark Endert

Sara Bareilles singles chronology
"Brave" (2013)	"I Choose You" (2014)	"She Used to Be Mine" (2015)

Music video
- "I Choose You" on YouTube

"I Choose You" is a song by American singer and songwriter Sara Bareilles from her fourth studio album, The Blessed Unrest (2013). The song was written by Bareilles, Jason Blynn and Pete Harper, and produced by Mark Endert, who also produced her hit "Brave".

"I Choose You" was released on January 17, 2014 as the album's second single and was featured in the television shows Life Sentence and Secrets and Lies. The song peaked at number 16 on the US Billboard Adult Contemporary chart, number 14 on the Billboard Adult Top 40 chart, and number 81 on the Billboard Hot 100. It was certified gold by the RIAA for sales in excess of 500,000 units.

== Composition and lyrics ==
The song is a mid-tempo indie pop ballad with elements of alternative music, set to a beat of 76 BPM. It is composed in the key of A Major, with the vocal range spanning from E3 - F♯5.

Its lyrics describe the act of falling in love and the "beautiful start to a lifelong love letter".

== Music video ==
The music video for "I Choose You" was directed by Dennis Liu and was released on May 5, 2014. It features two real-life couples - one heterosexual and one lesbian - delivering unique proposals to their significant others with Bareilles's assistance. The video combines footage of the preparations with shots of Bareilles singing, and culminates in the proposals.

== Critical reception ==
Mike Wass of Idolator described the production on the song as the most expansive of Bareilles's career, with its incorporation of "kooky staccato beats" and a "sprinkling of synths".

Jason Lipshutz of Billboard described the song as "nimble", and stated that its "backing vocals, string plucks and soaring romantic declarations would make this a bid for future wedding playlists".

Mesfin Fekadu of the Associated Press described the song as "a beautiful song about falling in love" which could "make anyone's irritating day better".

== Charts ==
"I Choose You" debuted at number 36 on the US Billboard Adult Top 40 chart for the week of March 1, 2014, and debuted at number 27 on the Billboard Adult Contemporary chart for the week of April 26, 2014. It has since reached the Top 20 on both charts. The song also debuted at its peak position of 81 on the US Billboard Hot 100 on May 24, 2014.

=== Weekly charts ===
Chart (2014)	Peak position
Belgium (Ultratip Bubbling Under Flanders)	53
US Billboard Hot 100	81
US Adult Contemporary (Billboard)	16
US Adult Pop Airplay (Billboard)	14

=== Year-end charts ===
Chart (2014)	Peak position
US Adult Contemporary (Billboard)	47
US Adult Pop Songs (Billboard)	45

== Certifications ==
Region	Certification	Certified units/sales
New Zealand (RMNZ)	Gold	15,000^{‡}
United States (RIAA)	Gold	500,000^{‡}
^{‡} Sales+streaming figures based on certification alone.
