= To Wish Impossible Things =

To Wish Impossible Things can refer to the following:

- "To Wish Impossible Things", a song by the Cure on their album Wish
- "To Wish Impossible Things", an episode from the first season of One Tree Hill, named after the Cure song
