= The Blessed Unrest =

Studio album by Sara Bareilles
- Released: July 16, 2013
- Recorded: 2013
- Studio: House of Blues Studios (Encino, CA); Indian River Studios (Florida); Sunset Sound (Los Angeles, CA); Canterbury Studios (UK); Electric Lady Studios (New York, NY)
- Genre: Pop rock; soul
- Length: 50:36
- Label: Epic
- Producer: Sara Bareilles; Mark Endert; John O'Mahony; Kurt Uenala

Sara Bareilles chronology
Once Upon Another Time (2012)	The Blessed Unrest (2013)	Brave Enough: Live at the Variety Playhouse (2013)

Singles from The Blessed Unrest
- 1. "Brave" Released: April 23, 2013; 2. "I Choose You" Released: January 17, 2014

The Blessed Unrest is the fourth studio album by American singer-songwriter Sara Bareilles. The album was released on July 16, 2013, through Epic Records. The lead single from the album, "Brave", was released digitally on April 23, 2013.

The album debuted at number two on the US Billboard 200, selling 68,000 copies in its first week. The album was certified gold by the Recording Industry Association of America (RIAA). At the 56th Annual Grammy Awards, the album was nominated for the Grammy Award for Album of the Year.

== Background ==
On February 26, 2013, Bareilles posted a video on YouTube stating that she was "Making a Record" and to "stay tuned for more updates." Following this, a video series began featuring six 2-minute installments showing Bareilles recording her album. On July 9, a week before the release, Bareilles made the album available for free streaming on iTunes.

Songs on this album are reflections of Bareilles' experiences, like going through a break-up.

== Recording ==
The Blessed Unrest was recorded in New York City and Los Angeles in early 2013 with co-producers John O'Mahony and Kurt Uenala. Electric Lady Studios was used to record the tracks in New York City.

== Promotion ==
On March 27, Bareilles announced the Brave Enough Tour, an 18 city US tour ahead of the album's release. Tickets to the solo acoustic tour sold out in just three minutes. In June, Bareilles also announced a co-headlining tour with OneRepublic, setting to begin on August 29.

Sara performed "Brave" and "I Choose You" on Live! with Kelly and Michael on July 17, 2013. She performed "Brave" on The Tonight Show with Jay Leno on July 19, 2013, appeared on the VH1 Top 20 Video Countdown on July 20, 2013, and on The Late Late Show with Craig Ferguson on July 22, 2013.

== Singles ==
"Brave" was released on April 23, 2013, as the lead single from the album. It was co-written by Jack Antonoff from the band Fun. An official lyric video was premiered on April 17, 2013. The song debuted at number 61 at the US Billboard Hot 100, and number 20 on its Hot Digital Songs chart. Following widespread comparisons to Katy Perry's "Roar", "Brave" re-entered the Hot 100 and eventually reached number 23 and number five on the Billboard Adult Pop Songs. The song has received positive reviews, many deeming it as one of her most "anthemic" singles to date.

"I Choose You" was announced on January 17, 2014, as the second single through Bareilles's Twitter's account. The song reached number 81 on the US Billboard Hot 100 and number 16 on Billboard Adult Pop Songs chart. Bareilles released the accompanying video on her YouTube channel on May 5, 2014.

== Music and lyrics ==
Stephen Thomas Erlewine of AllMusic told that the music is "moody and textured, rolling out at a deliberate pace and colored in blues and greys, skillfully skirting the edges of alienation". At Billboard, Jason Lipshutz felt that the album is "exciting when viewed in its larger context as a transitional album; the 12-song collection has its share of light fare that could earn spins on adult contemporary radio, but it's also more lyrically daring and serious-sounding". Elysa Garnder of USA Today stated that the release's "lingering traces of preciousness are mitigated by her sinewy hooks and thoughtful, tasteful delivery." At Entertainment Weekly, they said Bareilles is "channeling Fiona Apple and Florence Welch".

At Rolling Stone, Stacey Anderson touched on that "The Blessed Unrest is full of broad, exposition-heavy vignettes of heartache and resiliency; the songs feel groomed for rom-com soundtracks." Jon Caramanica of The New York Times felt that "vocally, Ms. Bareilles sounds bright, too, and comfortable [...] doing her familiar trick of making the melancholy chirp."

== Critical reception ==
Professional ratings
Aggregate scores
Source	Rating
Metacritic	68/100
Review scores
Source	Rating
AbsolutePunk	85%
AllMusic	4/5 stars
Billboard	75%
Entertainment Weekly	B+
PopMatters	6/10 discs
Rolling Stone	2.5/5 stars
USA Today	3/4 stars

The Blessed Unrest received generally positive reviews from music critics. At Metacritic, they assign a weighted average score based on reviews and ratings from selected mainstream critics, and the Metascore is a 68, based on seven reviews.

At AbsolutePunk, Craig Manning felt that Bareilles built "the sort of stunning and nuanced arrangements that elevate her songs beyond traditional singer/songwriter fare." Stephen Thomas Erlewine of AllMusic noted that "its melancholy is warm and inviting." At Billboard, Jason Lipshutz evoked that the "new album was the result of unrest, but as its title suggests, she has positively embraced her dissatisfaction and subsequently grown as an artist." Elysa Gardner of USA Today called this Bareilles' "most mature and satisfying to date, with fewer of the twee touches that marred her previous fare." At Entertainment Weekly, they said the album is " a lovely collection of confessional sketches."

However, Stacey Anderson at Rolling Stone highlighted that the release "hints at more adventurous paths left unexplored in its abstract piano and slightly distorted harmonies [...] odd, intriguing tools she could use for a second-act career twist, if she indulges them." Because of this, Anderson noted that Bareilles was "just too diplomatic." At The New York Times, Jon Caramanica was mixed on the album, when he alluded to how "Ms. Bareilles is hiding behind styles that aren’t her own." Brett Faulkner of PopMatters wrote that the release is a "well conceived effort, but not sans flaws."

== Commercial performance ==
The Blessed Unrest debuted at number two on the US Billboard 200 chart, selling 68,000 copies in its first week. This became Bareilles' fourth consecutive US top-ten album. For the year of 2013, the album was ranked at number 134 on the Billboard 200-year-end album charts. On June 2, 2016, the album was certified gold by the Recording Industry Association of America (RIAA) for combined sales and album-equivalent units of over 500,000 units in the United States.

== Track listing ==
All tracks are written by Sara Bareilles, with additional writers noted; all production is handled by Bareilles, John O'Mahony and Kurt Uenala, except where noted.

No.	Title	Writer(s)	Producer(s)	Length
1.	"Brave"	Jack Antonoff	Mark Endert	3:40
2.	"Chasing the Sun"	Antonoff	Endert	4:28
3.	"Hercules"			4:21
4.	"Manhattan"		Bareilles; O'Mahony	4:38
5.	"Satellite Call"			4:50
6.	"Little Black Dress"		Bareilles; O'Mahony	3:32
7.	"Cassiopeia"			3:33
8.	"1000 Times"		Bareilles; O'Mahony	4:30
9.	"I Choose You"	Jason Blynn; Pete Harper	Endert	3:38
10.	"Eden"	Matt Hales		4:05
11.	"Islands"	Hales		4:20
12.	"December"			5:01
Total length:				50:36

Official site pre-order bonus track
No.	Title	Producer(s)	Length
13.	"Root Down"	Bareilles; O'Mahony	2:42

iTunes Store bonus track
No.	Title	Length
13.	"I Wanna Be Like Me"	3:28
Total length:		54:03

Japan and Target bonus track
No.	Title	Length
13.	"Beautiful Girl"	4:02
14.	"Parking Lot"	3:34
Total length:		58:11

The track listing was confirmed via iTunes on May 14.

== Personnel ==
Musicians

- Sara Bareilles - vocals, piano, Wurlitzer organ, keyboards
- Colette Alexander - cello
- Jason Blynn - guitar
- Mark Endert - production, programming, keyboards, mixing
- Mary-Katherine Finch - cello
- Graham Finn - guitar
- Cochemea Gastelum - baritone saxophone
- Dave Guy - trumpet
- Rich Hinman - guitar, pedal steel
- Todor Kobakov - conductor, horn arrangements, string arrangements
- Csaba Koczo - violin
- Brian Kornfeld - drum programming technician
- Lyn Kuo - violin
- Chris Morrissey - bass
- Brian O'Kane - trumpet
- Stacey Proffitt - background vocals
- Curt Schneider - bass
- Sarab Singh - drums, percussion
- Aaron Sterling - drums, percussion
- Cameron Stone - cello
- Neal Sugarman - tenor saxophone
- Yosef Tamir - viola
- Kevin Turcotte - trombone
- Richard Underhill - alto saxophone
- Michael Ward - guitar
- Kurt Uenala – bass

Production

- Mastered - Greg Calbi
- Producer - John O'Mahony, Mark Endert (tracks: 1, 2, 9), Sara Bareilles
- Additional producer - Kurt Uenala (tracks: 3, 5, 7, 10 – 12)
- Recording assistants - Alex DeGroot, John Horne, Phil Joly, Geoff Neal, Dave Rowland, Alex Williams, Sadaharu Yagi
- Art direction - Holly Adams, Matt Taylor
- Digital Editing - Doug Johnson, Ian Shea
- Horn & string engineer - Jeremy Darby

== Charts ==
=== Weekly charts ===
Chart (2013)	Peak position
Australian Albums (ARIA)	73
Canadian Albums (Billboard)	7
Swiss Albums (Schweizer Hitparade)	55
US Billboard 200	2

=== Year-end charts ===
Chart (2013)	Position
US Billboard 200	134

Chart (2014)	Position
US Billboard 200	123

== Certifications ==
Region	Certification	Certified units/sales
New Zealand (RMNZ)	Gold	7,500^{‡}
United States (RIAA)	Gold	500,000^{‡}
^{‡} Sales+streaming figures based on certification alone.
