= Jenny Langlo =

Norwegian singer (born 1993)

Jenny Langlo (born 1 June 1993) is a Norwegian singer. She is known for winning the sixth season of Norwegian Idol. Her official debut single, "Building an Aeroplane" was released on video the following week. She competed in the Melodi Grand Prix 2015 with the song "Next to You".

== Discography ==
=== Singles ===
- 2011: "Building an Aeroplane"
- 2012: "Million Dollar Signs"
- 2015: "Next to You"

Preceded by Glenn Lyse	Idol (Norway) winner Season 6 (2011)	Succeeded by Incumbent
