= Chariot (album) =

Studio album by Gavin DeGraw
- Released: July 22, 2003
- Genres: Pop rock; soul
- Length: 40:21
- Label: J
- Producers: Mark Endert; James Diener (Stripped)

Gavin DeGraw chronology
Chariot (2003)	Gavin DeGraw (2008)

Singles from Chariot
- 1. "Follow Through" Released: August 11, 2003; 2. "I Don't Want to Be" Released: February 17, 2004; 3. "Chariot" Released: February 22, 2005; 4. "Follow Through" Released: August 8, 2005; 5. "Just Friends" Released: August 22, 2006; 6. "Meaning" Released: April 8, 2007

Professional ratings
Review scores
Source	Rating
AllMusic	3.5/5 stars
AllMusic	3.5/5 stars
Blender	2/5 stars
Common Sense Media	4/5 stars
Rolling Stone	3/5 stars
USA Today	3/4 stars

Chariot is the debut studio album by singer-songwriter Gavin DeGraw, first released on July 22, 2003, on J Records. It was re-released in 2004 as Chariot (Stripped), which featured two discs, the first containing the original Chariot album and the second disc featuring "stripped-down" (made simply and with minimal instrumentation) studio recordings of all of the original songs, as well as a cover of Sam Cooke's "Change Is Gonna Come". The album was successful and was later certified Platinum in the United States.

== Track listing ==
All songs written by Gavin DeGraw, except "Change Is Gonna Come" (for Stripped disc only) by Sam Cooke.

=== Original release ===
- Produced by Mark Endert
1. "Follow Through" – 3:59
2. "Chariot" – 3:59
3. "Just Friends" – 3:25
4. "(Nice to Meet You) Anyway" – 3:45
5. "Chemical Party" – 3:01
6. "Belief" – 4:27
7. "Crush" – 3:25
8. "I Don't Want to Be" – 3:39
9. "Meaning" – 3:35
10. "More Than Anyone" – 2:57
11. "Over-Rated" – 4:11
12. "Get Lost" – 4:28 (international digital reissue)

=== Stripped disc ===
- Produced by James Diener
1. "Follow Through" – 4:28
2. "Chariot" – 4:59
3. "Just Friends" – 4:49
4. "(Nice to Meet You) Anyway" – 4:46
5. "Chemical Party" – 4:54
6. "Belief" – 3:09
7. "Crush" – 3:20
8. "I Don't Want to Be" – 4:04
9. "Meaning" – 3:41
10. "More Than Anyone" – 3:50
11. "Over-Rated" – 6:22
12. "Change Is Gonna Come" – 12:27

== Personnel ==
- Alli – art direction, design
- David Ashton – assistant engineer
- C.J. Buscaglia – assistant engineer
- Andrea Cooker – stylist
- Kevin Dean – assistant engineer
- Gavin DeGraw – piano, keyboards, vocals, cover art concept
- Mark Endert – producer, engineer, mixing
- Steve Gryphon – programming, editing
- Tosh Kasai – assistant engineer
- Tim LeBlanc – assistant engineer
- George Marino – mastering
- Michael McCoy – overdub engineer
- Alvin Moody – bass
- MiMi "Audio" Parker – assistant engineer
- Chris Reynolds – assistant engineer
- Maria Santana – set design
- Steven Sebring – photography
- Michael Ward – guitar
- Oz Noy – guitar
- Joey Waronker – drums
- Patrick Warren – organ, harmonium, string arrangements

== Charts ==
=== Weekly charts ===
Weekly chart performance for Chariot
Chart (2003–2006)	Peak position
Australian Albums (ARIA)	74
Canadian Albums (Nielsen SoundScan)	150
Danish Albums (Hitlisten)	1
Dutch Albums (Album Top 100)	6
Finnish Albums (Suomen virallinen lista)	23
Italian Albums (FIMI)	43
Norwegian Albums (VG-lista)	2
Swedish Albums (Sverigetopplistan)	21
Swiss Albums (Schweizer Hitparade)	48
UK Album Downloads (Official Charts)	97
US Billboard 200	103
US Billboard 200 Chariot - Stripped	56
US Heatseekers Albums (Billboard)	1

=== Year-end charts ===
2005 year-end chart performance for Chariot
Chart (2005)	Position
Danish Albums (Hitlisten)	36
US Billboard 200 Chariot – Stripped	137

2006 year-end chart performance for Chariot
Chart (2006)	Position
Danish Albums (Hitlisten)	31
Dutch Albums (Album Top 100)	47

== Certifications ==
Certifications for Chariot
Region	Certification	Certified units/sales
Denmark (IFPI Danmark)	Platinum	30,000
Norway (IFPI Norway)	Gold	20,000^{*}
Netherlands (NVPI)	Gold	40,000^{^}
New Zealand (RMNZ)	Gold	7,500^{‡}
United States (RIAA)	Platinum	1,000,000^{^}
^{*} Sales figures based on certification alone.^{^} Shipments figures based on certification alone.^{‡} Sales+streaming figures based on certification alone.
