= Halfway Down the Sky =

Studio album by Splender
- Released: May 18, 1999
- Genre: Alternative rock; post-grunge; pop rock
- Length: 43:10
- Label: C2; Columbia
- Producer: Todd Rundgren

Splender chronology
Halfway Down the Sky (1999)	To Whom It May Concern (2002)

Singles from Halfway Down the Sky
- 1. "Yeah, Whatever" Released: 1999; 2. "Monotone" Released: 1999; 3. "I Think God Can Explain" Released: 2000

Professional ratings
Review scores
Source	Rating
AllMusic	2.5/5 stars

Halfway Down the Sky is the first studio album by the American rock band Splender. It was released on May 18, 1999, and has spawned two singles: "Yeah, Whatever" and "I Think God Can Explain". 226,000 copies have been sold in the U.S. The album title comes from a line in the chorus of the song "I Apologize".

== Track listing ==
All tracks are written by Waymon Boone.

No.	Title	Length
1.	"I Don't Understand"	4:01
2.	"Yeah, Whatever"	3:42
3.	"Monotone"	3:03
4.	"Spaceboy"	3:39
5.	"Special"	3:11
6.	"I Think God Can Explain"	3:55
7.	"Supernatural"	4:07
8.	"Irresponsible"	3:08
9.	"I Apologize"	3:21
10.	"Spin"	3:41
11.	"Cigarette"	4:01
12.	"Wallflower"	4:00
13.	"London"	6:12
Total length:		52:32

== Personnel ==
Credits adapted from AllMusic

Splender

- Waymon Boone - vocals, guitars, arranger
- James Cruz - bass, vocals, arranger
- Jonathan Svec - lead guitar, piano, backing vocals
- Marc Slutsky - drums, percussion

Cover

- Chris Wozniak - photography

Production

- James Diener - A&R
- Luke Ebbin - organ, programming
- Scott Gormley - engineer
- Todd Rundgren - producer, engineer
- Mike Shipley - mixing
- David Swope, Doug Wynne - assistant engineers

== Chart performance ==
The album debuted at No.36 on the Billboard Heatseekers charts on April 22, 2000. It peaked at No. 11 on May 27, 2000.

Chart (2000)	Peak position
US Billboard Heatseekers	11
US Billboard 200	200
US Hot 100	62
