= Idol (Norwegian TV series) season 7 =

Idol
- Season 7
- Hosted by: Stian Blipp
- Judges: Kurt Nilsen, Tone Damli, Esben "Dansken" Selvig, Gunnar Greve
- Winner: Siri Vølstad Jensen
- Runner-up: Eirik Søfteland
- Finals venue: Oslo Spektrum

Release
- Original network: TV 2
- Original release: January 11 – May 10, 2013

Season chronology
- ← Previous; Season 6

Idol 2013 was the seventh series of Idol held in Norway, broadcast during the spring of 2013. Auditions were held in winter 2012/13, and broadcast in January 2013, with the semi-finals broadcast in January/February. The first final round was held on Friday February 15 at 20:00 CET, with the grand final being held on May 10, 2013 in Oslo Spektrum.

It was won by Siri Vølstad Jensen, 17, from Ålgård in Rogaland, with 55% of the votes against runner-up Eirik Søfteland, 24, from Os Municipality, outside Bergen.

Known only as Idol during broadcast, it was the first series to drop the subtitle Jakten på en superstjerne (literal:the hunt for a superstar).

== Finals ==
=== Finalists ===
(ages during the finals)

| Contestant | Age | Hometown | Voted Off | Theme / Subject of songs |
|---|---|---|---|---|
| Siri Vølstad Jensen | 17 | Ålgård | Winner | Grand Finale |
| Eirik Søfteland | 24 | Os | May 10, 2013 | Grand Finale |
| Steffen Jakobsen | 23 | Grimstad | May 3, 2013 | 1) Acoustic songs 2) Choreographed songs |
| Astrid Sugaren | 17 | Tolga | April 26, 2013 | "Best of Idol" songs (Note: Songs performed by other competitors in previous seasons, along with a duet with said performer) |
| Astrid Smeplass | 16 | Rennebu | April 19, 2013 | Own compositions |
| Sverre Eide | 18 | Ålesund | April 12, 2013 | Norwegian songs |
| Georg Lipai | 18 | Loen | April 5, 2013 | Country music songs |
| Martine Rygvold | 25 | Hommelvik | March 22, 2013 | Own version of a famous song |
| Ola Weel Skram | 22 | Sogndal | March 15, 2013 | Number 1 Hits |
| Anniken Kolstad | 17 | Eidsfoss | March 8, 2013 | Contestant's choice |

== Elimination chart ==
Legend
| Did Not Perform | Female | Male | Top 10 | Winner |

| Safe | Bottom 3 | Bottom 2 | Eliminated |

| Stage: | | Semi | | | | | Finals | | | | | | | | |
| Week: | | 02/15 | 02/20 | 02/22 | 02/27 | 03/01 | 03/08 | 03/15 | 03/22 | 04/05 | 04/12 | 04/19 | 04/26 | 05/03 | 05/10 |
| Place | Contestant | Result | | | | | | | | | | | | | |
| 1 | Siri Vølstad Jensen | | | | | 2nd | | | | | | | Btm 2 | | Winner |
| 2 | Eirik Søfteland | | | | 2nd | | | | | | | | | | Runner-Up |
| 3 | Steffen Jakobsen | | 2nd | | | | | | | | | | | Elim | |
| 4 | Astrid Sugaren | | | 1st | | | | | | Btm 3 | Btm 2 | Btm 2 | Elim | | |
| 5 | Astrid Smeplass | | 1st | | | | | | | | | Elim | | | |
| 6 | Sverre Eide | | | | | 1st | | Btm 3 | Btm 3 | Btm 3 | Elim | | | | |
| 7 | Georg Lipai | 1st | | | | | Btm 3 | | Btm 3 | Elim | | | | | |
| 8 | Martine Rygvold | 2nd | | | | | Btm 3 | Btm 3 | Elim | | | | | | |
| 9 | Ola Weel Skram | | | | 1st | | | Elim | | | | | | | |
| 10 | Anniken Kolstad | | | 2nd | | | Elim | | | | | | | | |
