= I Don't Want to Be =

2004 single by Gavin DeGraw

Single by Gavin DeGraw

from the album Chariot
- B-side: "Just Friends"; "Get Lost"
- Released: February 17, 2004
- Studio: Sunset Sound, The Hook, Larrabee East (Los Angeles); The Hit Factory (New York City)
- Genre: Pop rock; alternative rock
- Length: 3:40
- Label: J
- Songwriter: Gavin DeGraw
- Producer: Mark Endert

Gavin DeGraw singles chronology
"Follow Through" (2003)	"I Don't Want to Be" (2004)	"Chariot" (2005)

"I Don't Want to Be" is a song by American singer-songwriter Gavin DeGraw from his 2003 debut album, Chariot. The song gained exposure after the chorus was featured as the opening theme to The WB/CW teen drama series One Tree Hill, and it was released as a radio single on February 17, 2004, serving as the second single from Chariot. The song peaked at number 10 in the United States in January 2005 and became a top-20 hit in Australia, Canada, the Netherlands, Norway, Scotland, and Sweden.

The song is certified double platinum in the US, having sold and streamed over two million units. In 2012, the song reached number 27 on the UK Singles Chart, its highest position, due to the finale of One Tree Hill's ninth and final season airing, which also featured DeGraw. The song's music video follows the message of the lyrics, featuring a girl investigating her high school peers while they are frozen in time, and she eventually decides to be herself.

== Background and composition ==
Gavin DeGraw wrote the song as a message to adolescents, encouraging them to be themselves and to not let outside factors change their personalities. DeGraw explained:

["I Don't Want to Be"] was heavily influenced by the identity crisis right now that exists amongst youth. It's almost like you can go into any town in the country and the kids don't necessarily have an identity of their own; it's like whatever is on television is who they are.

Upon finishing the song, DeGraw was happy with the results, but he was unsure if the song would become a hit despite being able to "have an impact on people's psyche and on their tapping toe". Musically, the track is written in the key of C minor and proceeds at a moderately slow tempo of 76 beats per minute.

== Track listings ==
UK and Australian CD single

1. "I Don't Want to Be" (album version) – 3:37
2. "I Don't Want to Be" (Stripped/acoustic version)
3. "Just Friends" (album version) – 3:24
4. "I Don't Want to Be" (video)

European CD single 1

1. "I Don't Want to Be" (album version) – 3:38
2. "I Don't Want to Be" (Stripped version) – 4:04
3. "Get Lost" – 4:26
4. "I Don't Want to Be" (video)

European CD single 2

1. "I Don't Want to Be"
2. "I Don't Want to Be" (Stripped version)

== Credits and personnel ==
Credits are adapted from the UK CD single liner notes.

Studios

- Recorded at Sunset Sound, The Hook, Larrabee East (Los Angeles), and The Hit Factory (New York City)
- Mixed at Larrabee North (Los Angeles)

Personnel

- Gavin DeGraw – lyrics, music, vocals, piano
- Michael Ward – guitars
- Alvin Moody – bass
- Joey Waronker – drums
- Mark Endert – production, recording, mixing
- Steve Gryphon – additional editing, additional programming

== Charts ==
=== Weekly charts ===
Chart (2004–2012)	Peak position
Australia (ARIA)	19
Austria (Ö3 Austria Top 40)	44
Canada CHR/Pop Top 30 (Radio & Records)	4
Germany (GfK)	99
Hungary (Rádiós Top 40)	27
Ireland (IRMA)	25
Netherlands (Dutch Top 40)	13
Netherlands (Single Top 100)	21
New Zealand (Recorded Music NZ)	30
Norway (VG-lista)	6
Scottish Singles Sales (Official Charts)	20
Sweden (Sverigetopplistan)	15
Switzerland (Schweizer Hitparade)	46
UK Singles (Official Charts)	27
US Billboard Hot 100	10
US Adult Pop Airplay (Billboard)	9
US Pop Airplay (Billboard)	1

=== Year-end charts ===
Chart (2004)	Position
US Adult Top 40 (Billboard)	18
US Mainstream Top 40 (Billboard)	97

Chart (2005)	Position
Netherlands (Dutch Top 40)	48
Sweden (Hitlistan)	88
US Billboard Hot 100	58
US Mainstream Top 40 (Billboard)	13

== Certifications ==
Region	Certification	Certified units/sales
Denmark (IFPI Danmark)	Platinum	90,000^{‡}
New Zealand (RMNZ)	2× Platinum	60,000^{‡}
United Kingdom (BPI)	Gold	400,000^{‡}
United States (RIAA)	2× Platinum	2,000,000^{‡}
^{‡} Sales+streaming figures based on certification alone.

== Release history ==
Region	Date	Format(s)	Label(s)	Ref.
United States	February 17, 2004	Contemporary hit; hot AC; triple A radio	J	
United States	August 16, 2004	Contemporary hit radio	J	
Australia	September 6, 2004	CD	J	
United Kingdom	June 20, 2005	CD	J	

== Use in media ==
- The chorus of the song is the opening theme to One Tree Hill. DeGraw performed the song on a season 1 episode of One Tree Hill. He returned for the season five finale to perform the song with Jackson Brundage. In the eighth season, several artists covered it for the season's theme music, including Spinnerette, Grace Potter, Against Me!, Kate Voegele, Tegan and Sara, Susie Suh, Patrick Stump, The New Amsterdams, Laura Veirs (who sung the intro), Lucero (who sung the intro) and Matthew Ryan (who sung the bridge in his version). DeGraw also performed the song for the series finale to celebrate their 10th anniversary of Tric.
- The song appears in the game Karaoke Revolution Party and is available as part of the downloadable content in the game Karaoke Revolution: American Idol Encore.
