= Brave (Sara Bareilles song) =

Single by Sara Bareilles

from the album The Blessed Unrest
- Released: April 23, 2013
- Recorded: 2013
- Studio: House of Blues Studios (Encino, CA); Indian River Studios (Florida); Sunset Sound (Hollywood, CA)
- Genre: Power pop
- Length: 3:39
- Label: Epic
- Songwriters: Sara Bareilles; Jack Antonoff
- Producer: Mark Endert

Sara Bareilles singles chronology
"Stay" (2012)	"Brave" (2013)	"I Choose You" (2014)

Music video
- "Brave" on YouTube

"Brave" is a song by American singer-songwriter Sara Bareilles from her fourth studio album, The Blessed Unrest (2013). It was released as the lead single from the album on April 23, 2013, by Epic Records. Bareilles wrote it with Jack Antonoff, as the singer was inspired by the struggles a close friend faced regarding coming out as gay. Bareilles requested Mark Endert to produce it with the explicit goal of radio airplay.

"Brave" received positive reviews from music critics, with one writing that Bareilles channels singers like Fiona Apple and Florence Welch. Some critics noted the similarity to Katy Perry's single "Roar," which was released four months later. "Brave" became Bareilles's third top 40 hit in the United States, peaking at number 23, and reached number three in Australia, her highest-charting single in the country to date. The single also reached number four in New Zealand, number 26 in South Korea, number 48 in the United Kingdom, number 58 in Canada, and number 88 in Japan. The song was covered by Lea Michele and Naya Rivera on the 97th episode of the musical series Glee, which aired on February 25, 2014. It was featured in a commercial for the Nokia Lumia 1020 and has continued to be used in adverts for Lumia devices.

The accompanying music video was directed by actress Rashida Jones, and features Bareilles singing intertwined with clips of people dancing in various public places such as a shopping mall, a gym, a library, and a bus stop. The singer also performed "Brave" during several live appearances, including at The Today Show and at The Voice. This song was also nominated for Best Pop Solo Performance at the 56th Annual Grammy Awards. Despite its international success, in the United Kingdom, "Brave" was released in March 2014, nearly a year after it was first released.

== Background and composition ==
"Brave"
A 21-second sample of the song's chorus, which features Bareilles encouraging her friend to "say what you want to say, and let the words fall out, honestly, I want to see you be brave."

"Brave" was written by Bareilles and Jack Antonoff from the band Fun in 2011. Antonoff described the song "as a real civil rights anthem at a time when there are no civil rights anthems and there's a giant need for civil rights anthems." Bareilles also discussed the song in many interviews, revealing that she thinks "there's so much honor and integrity and beauty in being able to be who you are, [and] it's important to be brave because by doing that you also give others permission to do the same." SiriusXM station The Pulse premiered the single on April 17, 2013. It was released for digital download as the lead single from Bareilles's fourth studio album, The Blessed Unrest, on April 22, 2013, through Epic Records.

"Brave" is a power pop song written in the key of B♭ major and with a moderate tempo of 92 beats per minute. During the "commanding chorus" as described by Jason Lipshutz of Billboard, Bareilles encourages her friend to talk, singing, "Say what you want to say, and let the words fall out, honestly I want to see you be brave." The singer revealed she was inspired to write the song from the struggles that a close friend dealt with regarding coming out. Bareilles requested Mark Endert to produce "Brave" with the explicit goal of radio airplay, saying, "I want my songs to be played on the radio. But I don't need a radio hit so bad that I'm willing to do anything for it."

== Reception ==
"Brave" garnered mostly positive reviews from music critics, with an Entertainment Weekly reviewer writing that Bareilles channels singers like Fiona Apple and Florence Welch. Jenna Hally Rubenstein of MTV wrote that "[Brave] marks the beginning of a new sound for Sara. As opposed to her previous subdued, organically slow ballads, 'Brave' is Sara's most mainstream, pop radio-friendly effort to date."

Vox contributor Julianne Hilmes thought the song has "a classic Sara Bareilles style to it. The moral of this song: speak up!" Jon Caramanica of The New York Times gave "Brave" a mixed review, considering it a "booming and jangly [song] that announce in scale what Ms. Bareilles's sweet and sometimes nervy voice doesn't always do on its own."

== Controversy ==
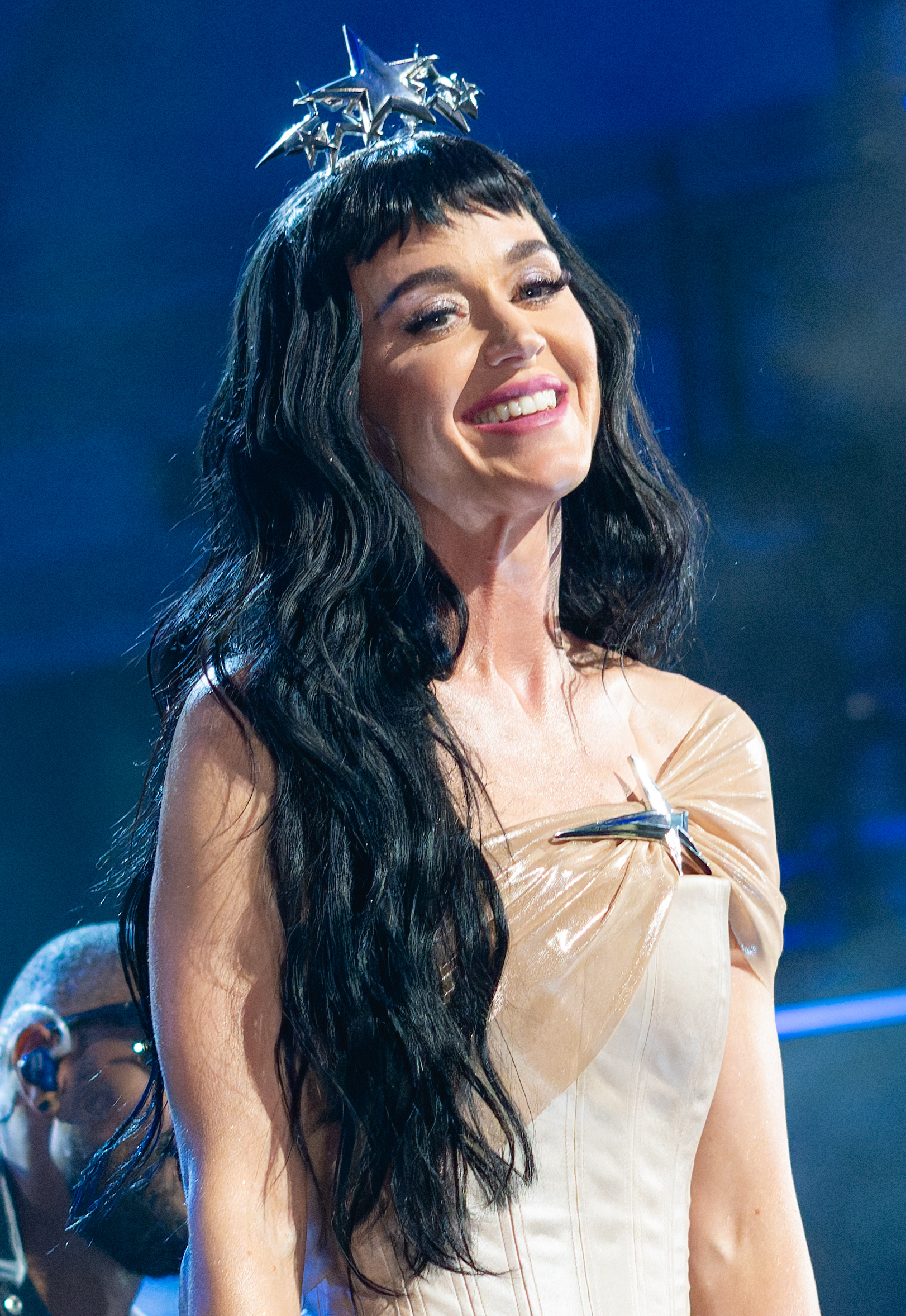
Many critics were accusatory in noting similarities between "Brave" and Katy Perry's "Roar", released four months later.

On August 10, 2013, approximately four months after the release of "Brave," Katy Perry released a single titled "Roar". Shortly after that release, Bareilles fans took Perry to task on social media, implying "Roar" sonically plagiarized "Brave" due to the song sounding somewhat similar and having similar subject matter. A May 2013 tweet in which Perry tweeted a link to and expressed her admiration for "Brave" was widely cited, and the controversy spawned a fanmade mash-up of the two songs meant to directly juxtapose perceived similarities. In response to the accusations, "Roar" co-producer/co-writer Dr. Luke tweeted on August 14, 2013: "Roar was written and recorded before Brave came out."

Perry and Bareilles performed "Roar" along with Bonnie McKee, Ellie Goulding, Kacey Musgraves, and duo Tegan and Sara at the We Can Survive: Music for Life concert on October 23, 2013. When asked about the controversy on ABC News Radio a few days later, Bareilles mentioned they are friends, and that the accusations, "[put] this negative spin on two artists that are choosing to share positive messages," adding, "If I'm not mad I don't know why anybody else is upset." Bareilles did, however, acknowledge the similarity of Perry's song to her own, a sentiment she repeated in a 2014 interview with CBS Sunday Morning reporter Ben Tracy: "I mean I can't say that I think that they don't sound similar ... [but] it's only really good for my song. So, thank you, Katy Perry for that."

In direct response to the attention "Brave" received following the plagiarism accusations, Epic Records promoted "Brave" to the mainstream pop radio format.

== Commercial performance ==
In the week ending May 5, 2013, "Brave" debuted at number 61 on the Billboard Hot 100 and number 20 on Hot Digital Songs component chart, with 76,000 downloads sold. Nine weeks later, the song jumped from number 70 to number 66, with sales up by 80%. In December 2013, it reached a new peak at number 26, becoming her third top 40 hit in the US following "Love Song" and "King of Anything". In February 2014, buoyed by sales and airplay after Bareilles's appearance at the Grammy Awards, "Brave" hit a new chart peak, moving up to number 23 on the Billboard Hot 100. The song reached its million sales mark in the US in November 2013, and its second million by April 2014. It managed to stay on the Billboard Hot 100 for 42 weeks. The song also charted in Canada, where it peaked at number 58, and in South Korea, at number 26. It charted at 88 on the Japan Hot 100.

In Oceania, the song was a success. On February 3, 2014, "Brave" debuted at number 15 on the New Zealand Singles Chart, over 9 months after its international release. The next week, the song reached the top ten and sat at number eight for two consecutive weeks. It became Bareilles's second top ten in that country, and her first in almost six years after "Love Song" peaked at number seven in March 2008. Then, on February 24, 2014, "Brave" rose to number seven and was certified Gold. This equaled the peak position of "Love Song". On March 3, 2014, it dropped to number nine, but the next week rebounded and jumped into the top 5, where it currently sits at number four, and thus became her biggest hit in New Zealand. Similarly, the song debuted at number 40 in Australia on February 10 and climbed to number 17 the following week, eventually peaking at number three, becoming Bareilles's second song to chart there (after "Love Song") and highest-peaking song.

== Music video ==
On April 17, 2013, a lyric video for "Brave" was released through Bareilles's Vevo account. The video was directed by NBC's Parks and Recreation actress Rashida Jones. When asked how they ended up working together, Bareilles said it "happened organically, which is something I've learned is really important to me in terms of my creative endeavors. ... I loved working with Rashida; I thought she was magical. She was so brilliant and creative and visionary and such an awesome person on top of it. I'd like to work with more women like that." The music video was filmed in Los Angeles, and premiered May 14, 2013. It features Bareilles singing intertwined with clips of people dancing in various public places such as a shopping mall, a farmers' market, a gym, a library and a bus stop concluding with Bareilles and the rest dancing together.

== Live performances ==
On April 23, 2013, Bareilles was interviewed and performed in SiriusXM's The Pulse studios. On April 25, 2013, she performed the song on The Today Show. On April 29, 2013, the singer performed "Brave" and "Uncharted" on AXS Live. On August 19, 2013, Bareilles performed the song with Taylor Swift at the Staples Center when Swift invited her as a special guest for the show for her Red Tour. On February 23, 2014, Bareilles performed "Brave" at the White House before Barack Obama and Michelle Obama.

As part of NBC's TODAY's Shine a Light series, Bareilles and Cyndi Lauper recorded a mashup of "Brave" and "True Colors" with to raise awareness and money for children battling cancer. As of October 2014, the project raised over $300,000 for Paediatric Cancer and donations continue to grow. On the first night of the 2023 US Open, Bareilles sung "Brave" for fans who were waiting to see Novak Djokovic's much-anticipated return to New York.

== Track listing ==
- Digital download
1. "Brave" – 3:39

== Charts ==
=== Weekly charts ===
Chart (2013–2014)	Peak position
Australia (ARIA)	3
Canada Hot 100 (Billboard)	58
Japan Hot 100 (Billboard)	88
New Zealand (Recorded Music NZ)	4
South Korea (GAON)	26
Switzerland (Schweizer Hitparade)	67
UK Singles (Official Charts)	48
US Billboard Hot 100	23
US Adult Alternative Airplay (Billboard)	17
US Adult Contemporary (Billboard)	2
US Adult Pop Airplay (Billboard)	3
US Pop Airplay (Billboard)	22

=== Year-end charts ===
Chart (2013)	Position
US Billboard Hot 100	96
US Adult Contemporary (Billboard)	22
US Adult Pop Songs (Billboard)	8

Chart (2014)	Position
Australia (ARIA)	34
New Zealand (Recorded Music NZ)	30
US Billboard Hot 100	74
US Adult Contemporary (Billboard)	9

== Certifications ==
Region	Certification	Certified units/sales
Australia (ARIA)	2× Platinum	140,000^{^}
New Zealand (RMNZ)	2× Platinum	60,000^{‡}
United Kingdom (BPI)	Silver	200,000^{‡}
United States (RIAA)	3× Platinum	3,000,000^{‡}
^{^} Shipments figures based on certification alone.^{‡} Sales+streaming figures based on certification alone.

== Release history ==
Country	Date	Format	Label
Worldwide	April 23, 2013	Digital download	Epic Records
