= Aleksander Denstad With =

Norwegian artist

- Born: 30 June 1987 (age 39); Trondheim, Norway
- Genres: Pop, rock
- Instruments: Voice, Piano
- Years active: 2006–present
- Label: Sony/BMG (2006-present)
- Website: AleksanderWith.com

Aleksander Denstad With (born 30 June 1987) is a Norwegian musician who won season 4 of the TV show Idol in May 2006, becoming the youngest person ever to win the competition.

Aleksander released his first album, titled 'Coming Home', on 23 October 2006. The album was a major success and peaked at #4 on the Top 40 Norwegian Albums Chart upon release. So far, "A Little Too Perfect", "The Other Side" and "Free Ride" have been released as singles from the album.

On 1 December 2007, Aleksander performed alongside Norwegian Pop-Rock artist, Marion Raven, at the Norwegian "Idol Gives Back" show.

== Pre-Idol ==
He was born in Trondheim.

WimpyLime were an unsigned project Aleksander and his former girlfriend, Vivian Sørmeland (who came third in Idol (Norway) Season 4) were a part of from the summer of 2004 until Idol in 2006. WimpyLime wrote all of their material as a group and together could play the keyboard, piano, guitar, bass, and drums. Aleksander and Vivian were the band's lead vocalists. Only two demos clips have leaked from WimpyLime's recorded catalog, one titled "Southern Skies" and another titled "The Secret". Members: Vivian Sørmeland, Aleksander With, Olav S. Flaa, Arne Fredrik Lånke

== Norwegian Idol 2006 Performances ==
Audition: "Dancing Shoes" Gavin DeGraw
Top 40: "Chariot" by Gavin DeGraw
Top 12: "Trouble" by Coldplay
Top 11: "American Woman" by Lenny Kravitz
Top 10: "Have Fun, Go Mad" by Blair
Top 9: "Unloved" by Espen Lind
Top 8: "I Don't Wanna Be" by Gavin DeGraw
Top 7: "The Way You Make Me Feel" by Michael Jackson
Top 6: "Glorious" by Andreas Johnson
Top 5: "Spider-Man Theme" by Michael Bublé
Top 4: "Everybody Hurts" by R.E.M.
Top 4: "One" (duet with Vivian Sørmeland) by U2 and Mary J. Blige
Top 3: "I've Been Losing You" by a-ha
Top 3: "Kiss From A Rose" by Seal
Finale: "Glorious" by Andreas Johnson
Finale: "Kiss From A Rose" by Seal
Finale: "A Little Too Perfect" (Winning Single)

== Discography ==
=== Albums ===
Year	Title	Chart positions	Sales
Year	Title	NO	Sales
2006	"Coming Home"	4	-
2010	"Still Awake"	4	-
2012	"Aleksander With"		-
2015	"The Butterfly Effect"		-

=== Singles ===
Year	Title	Chart positions	Album
Year	Title	NO	Album
2006	"A Little Too Perfect"	1	Coming Home
2006	"The Other Side"	2	Coming Home
2009	"What's The Story"	20	Still Awake
2009	"Worth It" (Featuring Lene Marlin)	2	Still Awake
2010	"Pictures"	10	Aleksander With
2011	"Satellites"	-	Aleksander With
2012	"Once"	-	Aleksander With

Preceded by Jorun Stiansen	Idol (Norway) winner Season 4 (2006)	Succeeded by Glenn Lyse
