= Tone-Lise Skagefoss =

Norwegian radio and television presenter

Tone-Lise Skagefoss (born 10 May 1974 in Nesbru) is a Norwegian radio and television presenter and head of music for Radio Norge.

== Career ==
She began her career as presenter and head of music at Radio Oslofjord. Later, she worked for Ole Evenrud at the record company Polygram. She was also a music journalist at NRK P3 and was a presenter on Poprush, Hammock and Platina. She also presented the music programme Svisj-show on NRK 2 for two years. In 1997, she was one of the three members of the Norwegian team that took second place on the Nordic pop quiz show Pick-Up.

Skagefoss was a member of the jury on the third and fourth season (2005–2006) of Idol on TV 2. She presented the programme Absolutt Underholdning on TV 2, while also working for Radio Norge.

She has also taken part in Zebra Grand Prix.
