= Glenn Lyse =

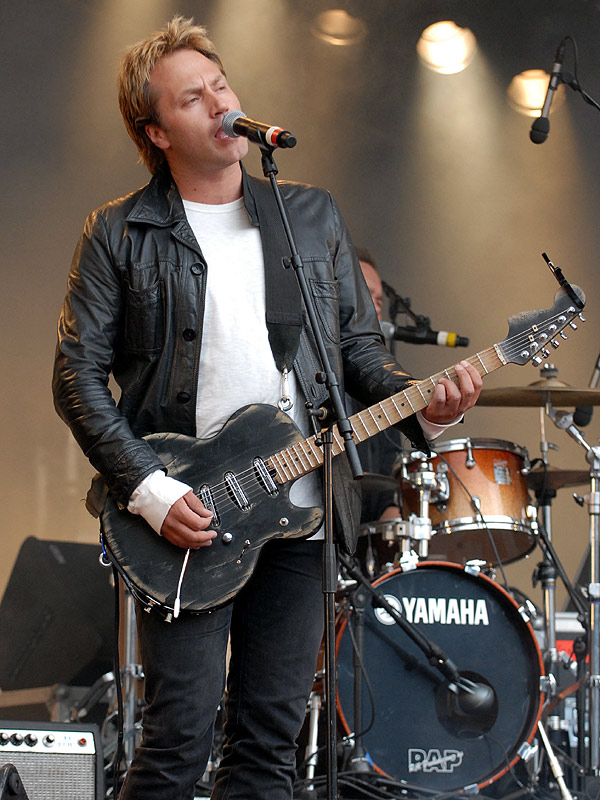

Background information
- Born: Glenn Roger Lyse; 4 April 1974 (age 52); Stavanger, Norway
- Instruments: Vocals, guitar
- Years active: 2007–present
- Label: Sony/BMG

Glenn Roger Lyse (born in Stavanger, Norway on 4 April 1974) is a Norwegian singer, songwriter and musician who won season 4 of the reality television show Idol on 21 December 2007. with other finalist Bjørn Johan Muri becoming runner-up.

Prior to Idol, Lyse had followed a musical career for many years, playing solo and in various bands, most notably in the trio Nash and in partnership with Christer Knutsen, the 1990s band Jam Pack. In 1996, he had taken part in tv2 show Stjerner i Sikte.

After winning the Idol, he was signed for a record deal with Sony BMG that released his winning song "Days Go By". This was followed by a second single "Guilty" in February 2008, just prior to the release of his debut album Come Closer released on 10 March 2008, with all songs (except the winning song "Days Go By") written by Lyse himself.

== Discography ==
=== Albums ===
Year	Album	Chart peak (NOR)	Certification	Details
2008	Come Closer	6		Track list: "Guilty"; "Look At Me Now"; "Days Go By"; "365 Days"; "Maniac"; "Would You"; "Dancing With the Shadow"; "Wasted Again"; "Not Allowed"; "Walk Upon Water"

=== Singles ===
Year	Album	Chart peak (NOR)	Certification	Album
2007	"Days Go By"	1		Come Closer
2008	"Guilty"	11		Come Closer

Preceded by Aleksander Denstad With	Idol (Norway) winner Season 5 (2007)	Succeeded by Jenny Langlo
