= To Whom It May Concern (Splender album) =

Studio album by Splender
- Released: August 20, 2002
- Genre: Alternative rock; folk rock; pop rock; post-grunge
- Length: 38:05
- Label: J
- Producer: Mark Endert

Splender chronology
| Halfway Down the Sky (1999) | To Whom It May Concern (2002) |

Singles from To Whom It May Concern
- 1. "Save It For Later" Released: 2002; 2. "Loneliest Person I Know" Released: 2002

Professional ratings
Review scores
| Source | Rating |
|---|---|
| Rolling Stone | link |

To Whom It May Concern is the second and final studio album of the American rock band Splender. Produced by Mark Endert, the album followed their 1999 debut album Halfway Down the Sky. The album peaked at #24 on the Billboard Heatseekers Chart.

== Track listing ==
All tracks are written by Waymon Boone.

| No. | Title | Length |
|---|---|---|
| 1. | "Happier This Way" | 2:56 |
| 2. | "High" | 3:35 |
| 3. | "But, Anyway" | 3:06 |
| 4. | "Loneliest Person I Know" | 4:04 |
| 5. | "Save it for Later" | 4:00 |
| 6. | "Maybe Someday" | 3:51 |
| 7. | "Here I Am, There You Go" | 3:22 |
| 8. | "No Big Deal" | 3:12 |
| 9. | "Wide Awake" | 3:54 |
| 10. | "Good Evening" | 4:32 |
| Total length: | | 52:32 |
