= Splender =

American alternative rock band

- Splender in 2002 (L–R: Jonathan Svec, Waymon Boone, James Cruz and Marc Slutsky)

Background information
- Origin: New York City, United States
- Genres: Alternative rock; post-grunge; pop rock
- Years active: 1997–2004
- Labels: J; Columbia
- Members: Waymon Boone; James Cruz; Marc Slutsky; Jonathan Svec

Splender was an American alternative rock band from New York City. The band consisted of lead vocalist and rhythm guitarist Waymon Boone, bassist James Cruz, drummer Marc Slutsky and lead guitarist Jonathan Svec. The band spawned two albums, Halfway Down the Sky and To Whom It May Concern and songs including "Yeah, Whatever" and "I Think God Can Explain", which later became hits before they disbanded in 2004.

== History ==
=== Early years ===
Vocalist, guitarist and songwriter Waymon Boone and bassist James Cruz formed the alternative pop/rock quartet Splender in 1997. The New York-based group went through various incarnations, eventually choosing drummer Marc Slutsky after he responded to an advertisement in the Village Voice and lead guitarist Jonathan Svec. Boone is the son of an R&B and Jazz singer, and toured with his mother in his youth.

When the band were originally known as Hidden Persuaders, they signed a 'development deal' with leading independent music publisher, Hit & Run Music Publishing, having been brought into the company by the New York office creative manager, Michelle De Vries, who worked closely with her colleague in the London office, Dave Massey, who had also championed the signing of the band which included Jimmy R. Landry on guitar and backing vocals, and Nir Zidkyahu on drums. The pair introduced the band to French promoters, and 'road managed' the group's first shows at festivals and clubs in Bourges Paris, Montlucon, London and Brussels, at the latter show supporting Primus. These were followed by a full European festival tour opening for nu-metal group Korn, as well as playing various shows around New York City.

=== Columbia Records, Halfway Down The Sky (1999–2000) ===
The band was signed to Columbia Records after winning the Battle of the Band competition. Todd Rundgren produced their 1999 debut album, Halfway Down the Sky. The album spawned two singles, "Yeah, Whatever" and "I Think God Can Explain".

=== J Records, To Whom It May Concern (2001–2003) ===
In 2001, the band signed to Clive Davis' J Records and later record their next album. The first single, "Save It For Later" was released in June 2002 and its music video was shot in Los Angeles. The first single reached no. 34 on the Billboard Top 40 on August 17, 2002. The album, To Whom it May Concern was then released on August 20, 2002. The second album has sold 16,000 copies and was peaked at no.24 at the Billboard Heatseekers Chart. In November 2002, Splender released their second single, "The Loneliest Person I Know" although it did not reach the Billboard charts.

=== Disbandment and planned reunion ===
Shortly following their second release, the band disbanded in 2004 and later went on to go on different projects. Waymon Boone announced via Myspace that the band was starting to record its new album and going on a tour in 2009. The project eventually fell through. During a lengthy radio interview, Waymon Boone confirmed that while the band had discussed reforming, it never came together.

== Members ==
- Waymon Boone – vocals, rhythm guitars
- James Cruz – bass, backing vocals
- Marc Slutsky – drums, percussion
- Jonathan Svec – lead guitars, backing vocals

== Discography ==
=== Albums ===
- Halfway Down the Sky (1999)
- To Whom It May Concern (2002)

== Singles ==
Year	Title	Peak chart positions					Album
Year	Title	US	US Pop	US Alt	US Adult Pop	CAN	Album
1999	"Yeah, Whatever"	—	46	24	26	—	Halfway Down the Sky
1999	"Monotone"	—	—	44	—	—	Halfway Down the Sky
2000	"I Think God Can Explain"	62	19	—	12	82	Halfway Down the Sky
2002	"Save It For Later"	—	—	—	34	—	To Whom It May Concern
2002	"Loneliest Person I Know"	—	—	—	—	—	To Whom It May Concern
"—" denotes releases that did not chart.
