= Mark Endert =

- Origin: California, U.S.
- Genres: Rock; pop; country
- Occupations: Record producer; mixer; engineer
- Instruments: Piano; keyboards; synthesizers
- Years active: 1990–present
- Website: www.markendert.com

Mark Endert is a Grammy Award winning American record producer, mixer, and engineer. Best known for his work with pop, rock, and country artists spanning multiple decades.

== Biography ==
From the early 1990s to the present, Endert is credited on albums spanning a wide array of musical genres with sales totaling more than 90 million albums worldwide.

He is best known for his work on the songs "This Love" by Maroon 5, "Brave" by Sara Bareilles, "I Don't Want to Be" by Gavin Degraw, and "Everything You Want" by Vertical Horizon.

Endert has been nominated for two Grammy Awards and has contributed to the Album of the Year nominees; Madonna's Ray of Light and Sara Bareilles' The Blessed Unrest. He won a Grammy Award for his contributions to Lauren Daigle's album Look Up Child.

== Notable album credits ==
Year	Artist	Album	Awards/ Rankings
1996	Fiona Apple	Tidal	Certified 3x Multi-Platinum by RIAA
1998	Madonna	Ray of Light	Won – Grammy: Best Pop Album, Best Dance Album, 16 Million Album Sales Worldwide
1999	Melanie C	Northern Star	Worldwide Sales Nearing 4 Million
1999	Ricky Martin	Ricky Martin	15 Million Album Sales Worldwide
1999	Vertical Horizon	Everything You Want	Certified 2x Multi-Platinum by RIAA
2000	Madonna	Music	11 Million Album Sales Worldwide
2001	Ours	Distorted Lullabies	
2002	Maroon 5	Songs About Jane	Certified 4x Multi-Platinum by RIAA, Over 10 Million Album Sales Worldwide
2002	Splender	To Whom it May Concern	
2003	Gavin Degraw	Chariot	Certified Platinum by RIAA
2004	Delta Goodrem	Mistaken Identity	Certified 5x Multi-Platinum in Australia by ARIA
2005	Anna Nalick	Wreck of the Day	Certified Gold by RIAA
2005	The Fray	How to Save a Life	Certified 2x Multi-Platinum by RIAA
2007	Delta Goodrem	Delta	Certified 2x Multi-Platinum in Australia by ARIA
2007	Maroon 5	It Won't Be Soon Before Long	Certified 2x Multi-Platinum by RIAA
2007	Rihanna	Good Girl Gone Bad	9 Million Album Sales Worldwide
2008	Miley Cyrus	Breakout	Certified Platinum by RIAA
2009	Train	Save Me, San Francisco	Certified Gold by RIAA
2010	Chris Tomlin	And If Our God Is For Us...	Won – Grammy: Best Contemporary Christian Music Album
2012	Train	California 37	Certified Gold by RIAA
2013	Chris Tomlin	Burning Lights	Nominated – Grammy: Best Contemporary Christian Music Album
2013	Sara Bareilles	The Blessed Unrest	Nominated – Grammy: Album of the Year
2014	MercyMe	Welcome to the New	Nominated - Grammy: Best Contemporary Christian Music Album
2014	Train	Bulletproof Picasso	
2017	Grace VanderWaal	Just the Beginning	
2017	MercyMe	Lifer	Nominated - Grammy: Best Contemporary Christian Music Album
2017	Train	A Girl, a Bottle, a Boat	
2018	Carrie Underwood	Cry Pretty	Certified Gold by RIAA.
2018	Lauren Daigle	Look Up Child	Won - Grammy: Best Contemporary Christian Music Album

== Notable song credits ==
Year	Artist	Song	Awards/ Rankings
1996	Fiona Apple	"Criminal"	Won – Grammy: Best Female Rock Vocal Performance
1996	Fiona Apple	"Shadowboxer"	
1996	Fiona Apple	"Sleep to Dream"	
1998	Madonna	"The Power of Good-Bye"	
1999	Madonna	"Beautiful Stranger"	Won – Grammy: Best Song Written For A Motion Picture, Television, or Other Visual Media
1999	Tonic	"You Wanted More"	
1999	Vertical Horizon	"Everything You Want"	Billboard Hot 100 #1 Single, Billboard's most played song in 2000.
2002	Maroon 5	"This Love"	Won – Grammy: Best Pop Performance by a Duo or Group with Vocal, #1 Mainstream Top 40 Single
2003	Gavin Degraw	"Chariot"	Certified Gold by RIAA
2003	Gavin Degraw	"I Don't Want to Be"	#1 Mainstream Top 40 Single
2005	Anna Nalick	"Breathe (2 AM)"	Certified Gold by RIAA
2005	The Fray	"How to Save a Life"	Nominated – Grammy: Best Rock Performance by a Duo or Group with Vocal
2005	The Fray	"Over My Head (Cable Car)"	Nominated – Grammy: Best Pop Performance by a Duo or Group with Vocal
2006	Five for Fighting	"The Riddle"	
2007	Maroon 5	"Makes Me Wonder"	Won – Grammy: Best Pop Performance by a Duo or Group with Vocals, #1 Hot 100 Single
2007	Maroon 5	"Wake Up Call"	Certified 2x Multi-Platinum by RIAA
2008	Maroon 5 feat. Rihanna	"If I Never See Your Face Again"	Nominated – Grammy: Best Pop Collaboration with Vocals
2009	Train	"Hey Soul Sister"	Certified 6x Multi-Platinum by RIAA
2009	Train	"If It's Love"	Certified Gold by RIAA
2009	Train	"Marry Me"	Certified Platinum by RIAA
2011	Christina Perri	"A Thousand Years"	Certified 8x Multi-Platinum by RIAA
2012	Train	"Drive By"	Certified 3x Multi-Platinum by RIAA
2012	Train	"50 Ways to Say Goodbye"	Certified Gold by RIAA
2013	Chris Tomlin	"Whom Shall I Fear (God of Angel Armies)"	Nominated – Grammy: Best Contemporary Christian Music Song, Certified Platinum by RIAA
2013	Phillip Phillips	"Gone, Gone, Gone"	Certified Platinum by RIAA
2013	Sara Bareilles	"Brave"	Nominated – Grammy: Best Pop Solo Performance
2014	MercyMe	"Greater"	Certified Gold by RIAA
2016	Train	"Play That Song"	Certified Platinum by RIAA
2017	Grace VanderWaal	"So Much More Than This"	Winner of America's Got Talent Season 11
2018	Lauren Daigle	"You Say"	Won - Grammy: Best Contemporary Christian Music Performance/ Song
2018	MercyMe	"Grace Got You"	Nominated - Grammy: Best Contemporary Christian Music Performance/ Song

== Personal life ==
Endert married in 2004, and the following year moved from the Los Angeles area to the east coast of Florida to start a family. Since then he has enjoyed balancing his professional and family life with his wife, son, and daughter.
