= Follow Through (song) =

2003 single by Gavin DeGraw

- Australian CD single artwork

Single by Gavin DeGraw

from the album Chariot
- Released: August 11, 2003
- Length: 3:59
- Label: J
- Songwriter: Gavin DeGraw
- Producer: Mark Endert

Gavin DeGraw singles chronology
"Follow Through" (2003)	"I Don't Want to Be" (2004)
"Chariot" (2005)	"Follow Through" (2005)	"Just Friends" (2006)

"Follow Through" is a song by American singer Gavin DeGraw, released on August 11, 2003, as the lead single from his debut album, Chariot (2003). The song, like all of the album, was written solely by DeGraw. Following the success of DeGraw's following singles "I Don't Want to Be" and "Chariot", "Follow Through" was remixed and re-released in August 2005. The song was a minor success, peaking within the top 20 in the Netherlands and Norway and reaching number 22 on the US Billboard Adult Top 40 chart.

== Track listing ==
1. "Follow Through" (album version)
2. "I Don't Want to Be" (live at the Scala)
3. "Follow Through" (Stripped version)
4. "Follow Through" (video)

== Charts ==
=== Weekly charts ===
Weekly chart performance for "Follow Through"
Chart (2003–2006)	Peak position
Australia (ARIA)	68
Netherlands (Dutch Top 40)	13
Netherlands (Single Top 100)	56
Norway (VG-lista)	12
US Bubbling Under Hot 100 (Billboard)	11
US Adult Top 40 (Billboard) 2003	27
US Adult Top 40 (Billboard) 2005	22
US Mainstream Top 40 (Billboard)	33

=== Year-end charts ===
Year-end chart performance for "Follow Through"
Chart (2005)	Position
Netherlands (Dutch Top 40)	40

== Certifications ==
Certifications for "Follow Through"
Region	Certification	Certified units/sales
United States (RIAA)	Gold	500,000^{^}
^{^} Shipments figures based on certification alone.

== Release history ==
Release dates and formats for "Follow Through"
Region	Date	Format(s)	Label(s)	Ref.
United States	August 11, 2003	Contemporary hit radio	J	
Australia	November 15, 2004	CD	J	
United States	August 8, 2005	Contemporary hit radio	J	
