= One Tree Hill season 1 =

One Tree Hill
- Season 1
- One Tree Hill Season 1 DVD cover
- No. of episodes: 22

Release
- Original network: The WB
- Original release: September 23, 2003 – May 11, 2004

Season chronology
- Next → Season 2

The first season of One Tree Hill, an American teen drama television series created by Mark Schwahn, began airing on September 23, 2003, on The WB television network. The season concluded on May 11, 2004, after 22 episodes.

The series premiere was watched by 2.5 million viewers and achieved a 1.9 Adults 18–49 rating on September 23, 2003. However, the following week it rose to 3.3 million viewers and a 2.4 demo, becoming only one of three shows to rise in its second episode in the 2003–2004 TV season. The overall first season averaged 3.84 million viewers, ranking #136 with 1.5 rating.

Warner Home Video released the complete first season, under the title of One Tree Hill: The Complete First Season, on January 25, 2005, as a six-disc boxed set.

== Cast and characters ==
=== Main ===
- Chad Michael Murray as Lucas Scott
- James Lafferty as Nathan Scott
- Hilarie Burton as Peyton Sawyer
- Bethany Joy Lenz as Haley James
- Paul Johansson as Dan Scott
- Sophia Bush as Brooke Davis
- Barry Corbin as Whitey Durham
- Craig Sheffer as Keith Scott
- Moira Kelly as Karen Roe
- Barbara Alyn Woods as Deb Scott (Note: Woods is credited as part of the main cast from episode 14 onwards; she is credited as recurring from episodes 4 to 13.)

=== Recurring ===
- Brett Claywell as Tim Smith
- Bryan Greenberg as Jake Jagielski
- Lee Norris as Mouth McFadden
- Cullen Moss as Junk Moretti
- Vaughn Wilson as Fergie Thompson
- Antwon Tanner as Antwon "Skills" Taylor
- Bevin Prince as Bevin Mirskey
- Emmanuelle Vaugier as Nicki
- Thomas Ian Griffith as Larry Sawyer
- Sarah Edwards as Theresa

=== Special guest star ===
- Gavin DeGraw as himself
- Sheryl Crow as herself

== Episodes ==
| No. overall | No. in season | Title | Directed by | Written by | Original release date | Prod. code | U.S. viewers (millions) |
|---|---|---|---|---|---|---|---|
| 1 | 1 | "Pilot" | Bryan Gordon | Mark Schwahn | September 23, 2003 | 177500 | 2.48 |
In the small town of North Carolina called Tree Hill, basketball is all the rage. Nathan Scott is the star of the high school basketball team called the Ravens and local town hero, while Lucas Scott is the only child of a single working mom, Karen. The two are half-brothers who share the same father, Dan Scott, who refused to ever accept Lucas' existence. Lucas is also a star basketball player but only plays with his friends at the park. One day, his uncle Keith shows the team's coach, Whitey, his abilities, and Whitey demands he joins the team. Nathan refuses to accept Lucas as his brother and doesn't want him stealing his life so he challenges Lucas to a game at the park, if Lucas wins he can join the team but Nathan will leave. Lucas wins but demands Nathan stay to punish him. Lucas also begins to have a crush on Nathan's girlfriend, Peyton, much to Nathan's annoyance. In the last scene, Lucas enters the school's gym while everyone is staring at him. The episode ends with a close-up to the park where Lucas used to play: it's finally empty.
| 2 | 2 | "The Places You Have Come to Fear the Most" | Bryan Gordon | Mark Schwahn | September 30, 2003 | 177501 | 3.30 |
Lucas blows his first varsity game and decides to quit the team. The wedge between Nathan and Peyton continues to grow after Peyton tires of Nathan's jabs at Lucas. Brooke, Peyton's best friend, decides she wants to sleep with Lucas but he does not reciprocate her advances as he and Peyton are growing to become friends. Meanwhile, Keith forces Karen to deal with her feelings for Dan after she refuses to set foot in the high school gym to support her son. This episode is named after Dashboard Confessional's song of the same title.
| 3 | 3 | "Are You True?" | Michael Grossman | Jennifer Cecil | October 7, 2003 | 177502 | 3.53 |
Annoyed by Lucas's growing popularity, Nathan searches for his weak spot and finds it in Haley James - Lucas's best friend. After convincing the team to aggressively haze Lucas, Nathan seeks tutoring help from Haley and tries to befriend her, after all, nothing could hurt Lucas more than seeing his best friend help his worst rival. Haley finally agrees to help Nathan but requires that they keep it a secret. Meanwhile, Brooke develops deeper feelings for Lucas. Karen must face some not-so-friendly acquaintances from the past in the form of moms she went to school with who judge her and Lucas. Peyton becomes furious with Lucas when she discovers that he secretly submitted her drawings to a local newspaper, but despite this, she meets with the editor and gets her realistic (albeit depressing) drawings published via her own column. This episode is named after the titular song by The New Amsterdams.
| 4 | 4 | "Crash Into You" | David Carson | Mark B. Perry | October 14, 2003 | 177503 | 3.78 |
Nathan hosts a party at Dan's beach house, complete with basketball players, cheerleaders, and beer, and invites Lucas to his surprise. Nathan takes the opportunity to bully Lucas and force him to quit the team. He humiliates Lucas by showing a video of Karen and Dan when they won prom king and queen. Haley and Lucas get into a fight when she asks him to consider things from Nathan's point of view and Haley leaves the party when Nathan humiliates Lucas. Nathan gets drunk and crashes Peyton's car and tries to cover it up by threatening Lucas to blame it on him. Lucas is forced to pay for the damages to both cars, much to Keith's dismay. When Lucas sees the wealth that was denied him, he finally confronts his mother about why she let Dan ignore them. Meanwhile, when Nathan's mom, Deb, returns home to hear her son was involved in a hit-and-run, she turns to Karen for advice. Deb realizes she needs to be more present. Lucas learns Haley is tutoring Nathan, who says she did it to help him. Peyton, having had enough of Nathan's bullying towards Lucas and lies, breaks up with Nathan. This episode's title is inspired by the Dave Matthews Band's song Crash Into Me.
| 5 | 5 | "All That You Can't Leave Behind" | Duane Clark | Story by : Jennifer Cecil & Ann Hamilton; Teleplay by : Jennifer Cecil & Mark Schwahn | October 21, 2003 | 177504 | 3.53 |
Lucas asks Keith to play with him in the annual "Father and Son" basketball game. Dan takes the opportunity to relive his glory days of playing basketball and makes it his goal to beat Nathan. Lucas realizes he got the better father figure after Dan publicly humiliates Nathan on the court. Meanwhile, Peyton turns down Nathan's attempts to make up; she is having a hard time dealing with the anniversary of her mother's death and finds a comforting ally in Whitey. Lucas is a friend to Peyton, being the only one to offer her any comfort as she deals with her mother's death. Haley continues tutoring Nathan and their developing friendship bothers Lucas. Nathan realizes Lucas and Peyton like each other. The original title of this episode comes from U2's titular album. The alternative title comes from Radiohead's titular song.
| 6 | 6 | "Every Night Is Another Story" | Jason Moore | Mike Kelley | October 28, 2003 | 177505 | 3.40 |
When Whitey throws Lucas and Nathan off the team bus for misconduct, the two boys wind up stranded thirty miles from home. On the long walk home, they encounter a carload of players from the team they just beat who kidnap them at gunpoint. The city kids steal their clothes and make them buy beer, alerting the police. Stranded, the boys must get the upper hand on the city kids and find a way to escape them. Injured during the game, Brooke needs Peyton to drive her home and Haley reluctantly accepts a ride with them. On the ride, Haley and Peyton become friends discussing relationships. Haley gives Peyton advice on her feelings for Lucas while Peyton tells Haley to be careful with Nathan. The girls come across the boys and they ride home together. Meanwhile, Karen and Keith attend a business function, and tempers flare when Dan and Deb are seated at their table. Dan causes Keith to drown his anger in alcohol and he gets drunk and attacks Dan for insulting Karen. Later that night, Keith tells Karen he loves her. This episode is named after a song by The Early November.
| 7 | 7 | "Life in a Glass House" | Robert Duncan McNeill | Mike Kelley | November 4, 2003 | 177506 | 3.62 |
The night of Dan and Deb's annual basketball appreciation party approaches and Dan is upset that Deb has invited Karen, Keith, and Lucas. Karen makes a new friend in Deb, who realizes she is a truly good person. Brook continues pining for Lucas and since he rejects her, she gets drunk. Drunk, she makes the kids play a game of truth or dare and dares Peyton to kiss Lucas. After kissing him, Peyton runs off and Lucas follows her and they confess their feelings and finally kiss. Haley and Nathan grow closer until Brooke spreads a vicious rumor that leaves Haley devastated and she will not hear Nathan's apology, realizing he cannot change. Later, Peyton and Lucas head off to have sex, but Lucas confesses that he wants them to be more than just sex and to finally have their relationship, which upsets Peyton who breaks things off and runs away. This episode is named after a song by Radiohead.
| 8 | 8 | "The Search for Something More" | John T. Kretchmer | Jennifer Cecil | November 11, 2003 | 177507 | 3.64 |
Looking for some fun, Brooke and Peyton crash a college party, but things turn ugly when one of the guys in the dorm drugs Peyton. After Brooke calls Lucas for help, the two bond while caring for a sleeping Peyton, prompting Lucas to look at Brooke in a new light. Meanwhile, Haley gives Nathan another chance and the two go on their first date but the evening is ruined when Nathan is too embarrassed to admit he is on a date with her to some guys from school. Meanwhile, Karen finds out she has been accepted to join a six-week cooking class in Italy and contemplates taking it. Deb, now friends with Karen, promises to handle the cafe and encourages her to go. Lucas promises Karen he will be okay with Keith and she leaves for Italy. Nathan apologizes to Haley and they share their first kiss. Dan becomes angry that Deb is becoming close friends with Karen. Karen kisses Keith goodbye and Peyton tries to mend fences with Lucas. This episode is named after a song by Antifreeze.
| 9 | 9 | "With Arms Outstretched" | Greg Prange | Mark Schwahn | November 18, 2003 | 177508 | 3.75 |
After fighting with his father and Haley, Nathan succumbs to the pressure he is feeling and takes amphetamines to help his game doing so to beat Dan's scoring record. However, he isn't prepared for the destruction the drugs do to both his body and his family. As he begins taking more and more, he begins to treat Haley badly and pressures her to hook up with him. Brooke takes Lucas out and gets him drunk and a tattoo which angers Keith, who feels Lucas is taking advantage of him. At the game, Nathan is two points away from beating Dan's score and collapses. He awakes in the hospital, with Dan not admitting he would ever take drugs. Feeling like he can't go back to normal, Nathan sneaks out of the hospital and spends the night with Haley, apologizing to her. Dan conveniently forgets to call Deb and she later throws him out of the house. After Nathan's collapse and near-death experience, Whitey posts a sign on the gym that reads "Basketball canceled until further notice". Peyton goes to Lucas to rekindle their relationship and tell him that she wants what he wanted too, but when she arrives at his house, Brooke is there with him. The episode ends with Lucas in the middle of both women, unsure who to choose. This episode is named after a song by Rilo Kiley.
| 10 | 10 | "You Gotta Go There to Come Back" | Keith Samples | Mike Kelley | January 20, 2004 | 177509 | 4.35 |
Lucas has decided he wants to be with Brooke, leaving Peyton scrambling to pretend that everything is fine. Whitey tells the team that practice is canceled until the team can find the fun in playing again. Dan tries to rekindle things with Deb but when she refuses he takes Nathan on a weekend outing in an attempt to bond with him and prove himself to Deb. However, he ends up treating Nathan no differently and Nathan storms off. Deb catches Lucas and Brooke buying condoms and has Keith talk with a rebellious Lucas. Elsewhere, Deb and Haley plan an open-mic night at the cafe which ends up being a huge success alongside special guest Gavin DeGraw. Jake reveals that he is a single father to his classmates. Peyton struggles to accept Lucas and Brooke's relationship but ultimately has to swallow her feelings as she is too scared to tell them how she really feels. This episode is named after a song by Stereophonics.
| 11 | 11 | "The Living Years" | Tom Wright | Mark B. Perry | January 27, 2004 | 177510 | 3.81 |
Nathan stops going to practice and he and Haley spend an afternoon at his beach house, where the liquor flows. Dan catches them and angrily confronts Nathan. Lucas and Brooke struggle to be more than a sexual relationship and find common interests as Brooke grows jealous of Peyton's relationship with Lucas. The Scotts see a therapist to try to fix their family problems, but the distance between Deb and Dan continues to grow. Peyton's dad is back in town and she struggles to tell him she wants him to stay in town and not leave her for so many months at a time. Thanks to Lucas, her dad is convinced to be around more. Nathan, tired of his family's pressure and fighting, quits the basketball team. This episode is named after a song by Mike + The Mechanics.
| 12 | 12 | "Crash Course in Polite Conversations" | Sandy Smolan | Jessica Queller | February 3, 2004 | 177511 | 3.89 |
After Peyton receives the devastating news that her father is lost at sea, she and Lucas take an overnight trip to Hilton Head to identify a body that has washed ashore. After a long night, Peyton's dad is found to be safe. Overcome with emotion, Peyton kisses Lucas, however they stop just short of sleeping together due to Lucas being with Brooke. Meanwhile, an unexpected visit from Dan's parents leaves the Scott family in turmoil, as numerous family secrets are revealed at Dan's birthday dinner. It is revealed Dan chose to quit basketball and lied about an injury, upsetting the whole family. Nathan becomes motivated to beat his father and rejoins the team. This episode is named after a song by Gameface.
| 13 | 13 | "Hanging by a Moment" | John Behring | Mark Schwahn | February 10, 2004 | 177512 | 4.00 |
Lucas and Peyton struggle with their feelings for each other and what to tell Brooke, so they start sneaking around together. Meanwhile, Brooke realizes she is in love with Lucas. Keith is nervous about Karen coming home and is ready to restart their relationship. A fight with Dan makes him drink some beers to calm down. Haley catches Lucas and Peyton kissing and is angry that he is doing something like that. They get into a heated argument over it where Lucas tells her she's only with Nathan because he wanted to hurt him, while Haley storms off angry. Deb catches Dan flirting with another woman and realizes she wants a divorce, despite this Dan doesn't. Peyton prepares to tell Brooke about her and Lucas. Haley and Nathan get into a fight when he admits they're only together because he wanted to upset Lucas. Keith and Lucas head to the airport to pick up Karen but are hit head-on, with the car slamming into Lucas. Dan witnesses the accident and pulls Lucas out of the car and speeds him to the hospital. Lucas is in bad shape and needs surgery and Dan has to acknowledge that he's his son. Keith is asked how many beers he had by a doctor as Karen returns and receives a phone call. In surgery, Lucas flatlines. This episode is named after a song by Lifehouse.
| 14 | 14 | "I Shall Believe" | Greg Prange | Jennifer Cecil | February 17, 2004 | 177513 | 4.39 |
Lucas is revived but is left in a coma with his shoulder also injured. Karen meets Brooke and learns that Deb and Dan are divorcing. Most shocking of all, Karen is horrified to discover that Keith was drinking while driving at the time of the accident and demands Keith leave, having betrayed her. Nathan tries to win Haley back, but she is too upset about Lucas. Haley struggles to bring herself to see Lucas, upset that their last interaction was a fight and worried he may not wake up. Peyton also struggles to visit him after seeing how much Brooke loves him. Keith pays Lucas' extremely high medical bills. Despite pleas from his friends and family over several days, Lucas wakes up when Nathan goes to see him. Haley finally visits Lucas and cries in his arms as they hug. Peyton dedicates a vigil to Lucas and her love for him. Keith is revealed to have had plans to propose to Karen. Karen thanks Dan for saving Lucas' life and ultimately breaks down crying after the last few days' events. This episode is named after a song by Sheryl Crow.
| 15 | 15 | "Suddenly Everything Has Changed" | David Carson | Mark B. Perry | February 24, 2004 | 177514 | 3.87 |
After his near-death experience, Lucas decides he made the wrong choice between Brooke and Peyton so he breaks things off with Brooke and secretly rekindles his romance with Peyton. Brooke is heartbroken by Lucas breaking up with her and tries to be friends with him. Lucas sneaks out of bed to go see Peyton and collapses forcing Peyton to take him to the hospital. Meanwhile, unable to pay his mortgage after paying Lucas' hospital bill, Keith puts his garage up for sale. Nathan decides he doesn't like living with either Deb or Dan due to their constant fighting. Karen helps Jake parent Jenny and work. Dan tells Nathan he is going to fight Deb so he can see Nathan and that he'll make things hell for her by revealing secrets of her past. Nathan confronts Deb but she can't bring herself to come clean to him. Peyton breaks things off with Lucas, not wanting to hurt Brooke anymore. And later, Brooke tells Peyton she saw Lucas come to see her on her webcam and that she knows they both lied to her. This episode is named after a song by Cat Stevens.
| 16 | 16 | "The First Cut Is the Deepest" | Robert Duncan McNeill | Mike Kelley | March 2, 2004 | 177515 | 3.95 |
Nathan must decide which parent to live with after the divorce, but Dan decides to force his hand by threatening to reveal Deb's darkest secrets in court unless Nathan chooses him. Dan also attempts to bribe Nathan, which only angers him. Brooke is refusing to talk to Peyton or Lucas, declaring she doesn't want to ever talk to either of them again. Lucas, feeling upset at his recent breakups, sneaks out and meets a beautiful stranger in a bar, while trying to drink his frustrations with his shoulder away. He and the girl, Nicky, sneak out to a closed mall and have sex but she later disappears. Dan offers to buy Keith's garage and let him buy it back from him in time, and he begrudgingly takes the offer. Elsewhere, Peyton babysits for Jake. Lucas realizes he's becoming a person he doesn't recognize and vows to make things better. Deb confesses to Nathan that she left Dan for another man many summers ago and chose to leave Nathan with Dan. Nathan is heartbroken as she chose to leave him miserable with Dan and that impacted his whole life. Lucas apologizes to Brooke, who wants nothing to do with him. Nathan decides to emancipate from his parents. Sheryl Crow appears as herself and performs the song "The First Cut Is The Deepest" in Karen's Cafe. Nicky is revealed to be Jenny's mom. This episode is named after a song by Sheryl Crow.
| 17 | 17 | "Spirit in the Night" | Duane Clark | Terrence Coli | April 6, 2004 | 177516 | 3.24 |
The gang hits the road to Charlotte where Brooke is determined to win first place at the annual cheerleading competition to one-up a nasty rival cheerleader. But when one of her squad falls ill, Peyton begs Haley to step into a cheerleader's shoes for a day. Mouth helps Brooke to create an all-new routine with Peyton's musical skills. Karen must cancel a date with Keith to chaperone the trip. Dan becomes an unreasonable boss forcing Keith to quit and give him the garage. Whitey assigns Lucas and Nathan to the same room after failing to make them closer through practice. Karen and Peyton's dad chaperone the trip and begin flirting with each other. Lucas grows upset with Haley, feeling she has no time for him and not liking her being so close with Nathan. The boys sneak out past curfew and accidentally go to a male strip club. The girls perfect their team and sneak away to the hot tub which turns into a pool party with the guys. The girls do not win the competition, but Brooke wins a special award. The boys win the game and Whitey's 500th game. Lucas apologizes to Haley and tries to be cordial to Nathan. Taking Nathan's advice, Lucas later powers through the pain and tries to practice. Peyton thinks that she and Brooke are mending fences, but Brooke says they were just caught up in the weekend and that they aren't friends anymore. Nathan moves into his own apartment. This episode is named after a song by Bruce Springsteen.
| 18 | 18 | "To Wish Impossible Things" | Billy Dickson | Mark Schwahn | April 13, 2004 | 177517 | 4.81 |
Lucas, Nathan, and Jake are auctioned off to the highest bidder in the annual "Boy Toy" charity auction. Haley bids on Lucas and is excited to spend time with him after spending so much time with Nathan. The two have fun like old times before their lives blew up and Haley ends up revealing she got Nathan's Jersey Number tattooed on her and that she's in love with him. Jake is bought by Nicki, who beat Peyton, and who wants back in Jenny's life, but he refuses. She promises to be a part of her life with or without him. Haley asks Peyton to bid on Nathan and the two have fun while discussing their relationship. Nathan demonstrates growth and promises Peyton that he's trying to be a good guy, and not pressuring Haley into anything. Peyton shares that she's proud of him. Deb bids on Timmy who mistakes the bid for sex and Dan walks in on a compromising scene. Karen and Larry go on a date and after a talk with Whitey, Keith realizes he can't hide his feelings. Meanwhile, having missed out on the auction, Brooke ends up spending the night with Mouth and he has the time of his life. Brooke acts depressed all night and grows tired of her party lifestyle and confides in Mouth, who shares that he thinks Lucas truly is a great guy. Peyton and Nathan end the night with the auction's traditional kiss, which Lucas witnesses and thinks is more. He hides the kiss from Haley and promises her she'll always have him, despite their new relationships, and that she'll be okay. Keith proposes to Karen. Brooke finds Lucas and tells him that she thinks she's pregnant. This episode is named after a song by The Cure.
| 19 | 19 | "How Can You Be Sure?" | Thomas J. Wright | Karyn Usher | April 20, 2004 | 177518 | 4.40 |
Brooke takes a pregnancy test and finds out she's pregnant, which a doctor confirms. Dan advises Lucas to have the baby aborted, which is what he wanted Karen to do. Haley and Nathan struggle with Haley feeling pressured to have sex and Nathan doing his best to not pressure her. Nathan also struggles with paying rent for his apartment and sells his car as Deb and Dan try to convince him to come home. Karen turns down Keith's proposal as she wants to see who she is when she's not defined by being a mother. Nicki tries to force her way into Jake's life and views Peyton as a threat. She meets with Lucas and they vow not to tell Jake about their hookup. Lucas tells Karen that Brooke is pregnant and she is heartbroken for him. Lucas decides he's going to be the father Dan wasn't, but he thanks Dan for letting him see how he felt with him. As Lucas vows to be there for her, Brooke reveals the doctor told her she isn't pregnant and she lied about it to hurt Lucas for kissing her best friend. Keith tells Karen he's leaving Tree Hill and pawns the wedding ring. Dan looks through a box of keepsakes he's kept on Lucas' childhood over the years. Nathan tells Haley he loves her. Lucas tells Karen it was just a scare and thanks her for everything she's done for him. This episode is named after a song by Radiohead.
| 20 | 20 | "What Is and What Should Never Be" | Perry Lang | Edward Kitsis & Adam Horowitz | April 27, 2004 | 177519 | 4.23 |
Haley is excited to be throwing her first ever party while Nathan takes a fast-food job at the mall to cover expenses. Nathan's job is hard for him, despite this he puts in the effort. Haley doesn't invite Brooke to the party so she goes to a bar, meets the infamous Nikki and they decide to crash the party together. The party spirals out of control when too many people show up and is amplified when Nikki gets into a catfight with Peyton. After the fight, Nikki reveals to everyone that she and Lucas slept together. The police arrive and arrest Nathan for the party. Deb and Dan continue to fight over the divorce and end up sleeping together. However, the experience helps Dan realize things can't go backwards and he gives her the divorce the next morning. Dan bails Nathan out of jail who still refuses to come home and tells Lucas to ask Karen what really happened between them. Keith takes a teaching job in Charleston and Karen realizes she's never viewed him as more than a friend. Haley realizes she's becoming popular. Brooke and Peyton call a truce, but Brooke isn't sure they can ever get back to where they were before and be friends again. Brooke laments that Lucas made mistakes just like everyone did, but Peyton says it hurts more when you didn't expect it. Brooke lets a tear fall, showing she's still heartbroken over his betrayal. Peyton is upset that Lucas could so easily sleep with a stranger and says that he's turned into the bad guy Nathan was when they met. This episode is named after a song by Led Zeppelin.
| 21 | 21 | "The Leaving Song" | Davis Carson | Jennifer Cecil & Mark B. Perry | May 4, 2004 | 177520 | 4.09 |
Karen confesses to Lucas that Dan asked for joint custody and she denied it. Lucas is upset that he never got to know Dan and wonders if things would be different. Peyton and Brooke, both now angry with Lucas, are friends again. Dan becomes the temporary coach of the basketball team when Whitey has to have eye surgery. Haley finds that Nathan has been looking at porn on his computer and has kept pictures of Peyton and feels offended and that she can't live up to those women. When Peyton takes Jenny to the mall, Nikki kidnaps her for a short period of time, which upsets Jake. Jake learns she plans to take him to court and that she will probably win. Nathan realizes that he is pressuring Haley for sex in ways he doesn't even know by looking at those websites while Haley says all she can give him is her heart. Nathan and Lucas spend time together practicing for the playoffs and share their respective troubles with each other and end up growing closer and somewhat becoming friends. Lucas ponders how things could have been between them growing up together. Keith learns of Karen's secret and is upset that he never knew who Dan really was. Dan finally gives Deb the divorce papers, and she is left surprisingly sad. Jake leaves town with Jenny, seeing it as the only way to keep Jenny. Lucas apologizes to Peyton and promises he is going to change. Keith tells Karen that he's been left with nothing and is upset that she kept her secret from him. Lucas tells Karen and Keith that the only way to change and become a better person after all the mistakes he's made is to leave Tree Hill with Keith for a new start. This episode is named after a song by AFI.
| 22 | 22 | "The Games That Play Us" | Greg Prange | Mark Schwahn | May 11, 2004 | 177521 | 4.49 |
At the playoffs game, Dan coaches Lucas and Nathan in an extreme and abusive way. The team is locked in a dead heat and a player from the other team intentionally hurts Lucas' shoulder. Dan forces him to play regardless and the team loses. Afterwards, Dan chews the team out leading to Nathan finally standing up to Dan and defending Lucas. Brooke and Peyton orchestrate a plan to get rid of Nikki by sending her to Seattle instead of Savannah. Haley decides she's ready to have her first time with Nathan. Lucas says a tearful goodbye to Haley. Lucas and Nathan share a heartfelt goodbye, where Nathan finally calls Lucas his brother and says he's going to miss him, showing how much he and their relationship have changed. Lucas responds with "I'll miss you too, little brother". Karen tells Lucas goodbye and reminds him that Tree Hill and the people in it will always be his home. Deb and Keith talk about their respective relationship losses and sleep together and Dan walks in on them. Dan tells Keith he is no longer his brother. As Dan is signing the divorce papers, he falls to the ground with a heart attack. Deb later finds him and he whispers to her that she better hope he dies. Whitey learns his eye may be more serious. Lucas leaves a goodbye note for Brooke and Peyton. Lucas goes to say goodbye to Haley and is upset that she's slept with Nathan, but she reveals that the two got married. As Lucas and Keith drive away, Lucas narrates that trouble lies ahead. This episode is named after a song by The Blackouts.

== Reception ==
| Season | Timeslot | Season premiere | Season finale | TV season | Rank | Viewers (in millions) | Rating |
|---|---|---|---|---|---|---|---|
| 1 | Tuesday 9/8C | September 23, 2003 | May 11, 2004 | 2003–2004 | #136 | 3.84 | 1.5 |

== DVD release ==
The DVD release of season one was released after the season has completed broadcast on television. It has been released in Regions 1, 2 and 4. As well as every episode from the season, the DVD release features bonus material such as audio commentaries on some episodes from the creator and cast, deleted scenes, gag reels and behind-the-scenes featurettes. The words "The WB Presents" were printed on the packaging before the "One Tree Hill" title, although they were not included on international releases as The WB was not the broadcaster.

The Complete First Season
| Set details | | | Special features |
| 22 episodes; 944 minutes (Region 1); 903 minutes (Region 2); 862 minutes (Region 4); 6-disc set; 1.33:1 aspect ratio; Languages: English (Dolby Digital 2.0 Surround); Subtitles: English, Spanish and French (Region 1); English, Arabic, Dutch, Norwegian, Swedish, English for the Hearing Impaired (Regions 2 and 4) | | | Audio commentaries: "Pilot" - with creator/executive producer/writer Mark Schwahn and executive producer Joe Davola; "To Wish Impossible Things" - with creator/executive producer/writer Mark Schwahn and executive producer Joe Davola; "The Games That Play Us" - Commentary 1 with actors Chad Michael Murray, James Lafferty, Hilarie Burton, Bethany Joy Galeotti and Sophia Bush. Commentary 2 with actors Paul Johansson, Moira Kelly, Craig Sheffer and Barbara Alyn Woods.; Deleted scenes: Episodes: 2, 5, 9, 10, 11, 13, 14, 16, 17, 18, 19, 21, 22; "Diaries from the Set"; "Building a Winning Team: The Making of One Tree Hill"; "Christmas Elf Gag"; Exclusive unaired music performance of "Chariot" by Gavin DeGraw with introduction |
Release dates
| United States | United Kingdom | Australia | |
| January 25, 2005 | September 5, 2005 | February 1, 2006 | |
