= Harper Blynn =

American rock band

- Origin: New York City
- Genre: Indie rock
- Years active: 2008-2014
- Label: Independent
- Members: J. Blynn; Pete Harper; Whynot Jansveld; Sarab Singh
- Website: www.harperblynn.com

Harper Blynn was a New York-based American rock band composed of singer-songwriters Pete Harper (guitar and vocals) and J. Blynn (guitar and vocals) with Whynot Jansveld on bass and Sarab Singh on drums.

== Career ==
Harper, a native of Chicago, and Philadelphia-born Blynn met at Amherst College and began playing together in 2001. In 2005, they relocated to New York City, along with drummer Sarab Singh, a high school friend of Blynn's. In 2008, Jansveld joined the group, and in 2010, the band was renamed Harper Blynn.

After performing at sold-out shows at venues including the Bowery Ballroom, Harper Blynn released a self-titled EP; following the release of the record, they toured extensively, performing more than 150 concert dates prior to releasing their full-length debut, Loneliest Generation, in 2010. Produced by David Kahne, the record garnered positive critical reception, with Last FM describing it as "classic pop reimagined" and Time Out New York stating "If pop hooks were Monopoly money, this foursome would be buying hotels on Park Place by now."

Recorded in Chicago, Los Angeles, and New York, Harper Blynn's second full-length album was released in 2012 to similar critical acclaim. Titled Busy Hands, the 13-song album was co-produced by John O'Mahoney (Coldplay). In addition to performing headlining shows in support of the album, Harper Blynn toured with Ingrid Michaelson, and Greg Laswell, as well as Sara Bareilles, who joined the band on stage and said that "Harper Blynn blows my mind." Harper Blynn additionally performed on Bareilles' 2013 release, The Blessed Unrest, which was nominated for a 2013 Album of the Year Grammy Award.

Harper Blynn performed their last show February 18, 2014 at the Bootleg Theater in Los Angeles, where they announced they would be changing their name to Mosco Rosco.

== Discography ==
- Get It Out 2015 (LP)
- Busy Hands 2012 (LP)
- Harper Blynn 2010 (EP)
- Loneliest Generation (2010) (LP)
