= Skedsmokorset =

Coordinates: 60°01′N 11°02′E

- Village
- Location in Akershus
- Country: Norway
- Region: Østlandet
- County: Akershus
- Time zone: UTC+01:00 (CET)
  - Summer (DST): UTC+02:00 (CEST)

Skedsmokorset is a village in the municipality of Lillestrøm and in the county of Akershus. Its population is approximately 15,000.

The town has a bus terminal, and a shopping centre, Skedsmo Senter.
