= Idol (Norwegian TV series) =

- Idol - Jakten på en superstjerne
- Created by: Simon Fuller
- Presented by: Solveig Kloppen; Kåre Magnus Bergh and others
- Judges: Jan Fredrik Karlsen; Tone-Lise Skagefoss; Ole Evenrud and others
- Country of origin: Norway
- No. of seasons: 11
- No. of episodes: 180

Production
- Production companies: FremantleMedia; 19 Television; Monster Media

Original release
- Release: January 2003 – 2020

Idol - Jakten på en superstjerne is a television show on the Norwegian television channel TV 2, based on the popular British show Pop Idol. The show describes itself as a "Search For A SuperStar". The contestants are first narrowed down to 100 contestants, and then down to 24-50 through several auditions and tests by a panel of judges. From this point on, the viewers decide who are in and who are out, and the judges limit themselves to commenting. TV viewers being what they are, the votes are based not solely on the singers vocal performance, but also on their looks, clothes, entertainment value, and other factors. In the first four seasons the agelimit for participation was 16–28 years old. In season five it was changed to 16–35.

Idol in Norway is unique in that contestants have been allowed to perform self composed songs since the first season in 2003.

== Season synopsis ==
=== Season 1 ===
In the first season (2003), 50 people were narrowed down to 10, with each contestant performing live. However, the official number of legal contestants was narrowed down to nine when Idol-finalist Jeanette Vik was disqualified for being underage. Tone Anette Eidsheim Elde who had been eliminated in the very first finalshow got a second chance. Four judges provided critiques of each competitor's performance. Viewers had several hours following the broadcast of the show to phone in their votes for their favorite contestant. Later the same night, the contestant with the fewest votes was sent home.

Kurt Nilsen won season one, with Gaute Ormåsen coming in second. Kurt got 53% of the votes. Nilsen went on to win World Idol in the beginning of 2004.

=== Season 2 ===
In the second season (2004) they changed the procedures a bit. First the contestants were narrowed down to 40 instead of 50. Then, after four shows where 2 of 10 were voted forward in each show, a fifth show was aired, where eight "wildcards" selected by the judges from all of the earlier contestants competed for the two last places. In addition to these 10 finalists, the judges picked a final 11th contestant, Håkon Njøten.

Kjartan Salvesen won season two, with Margaret Berger coming in second. Kjartan got 59% of the votes.

=== Season 3 ===
The third season (2005) was a bit different as well. First the contestants were narrowed down to 50. Then, after five shows where 2 of 10 were voted forward in each show. But the judges were not pleased and got to take two more straight to final, Erik Flaa and David Bakke, making the total of finalists to 12.

Jorun Stiansen won season three, with Tone Damli Aaberge coming in second. Jorun got 55% of the votes.

=== Season 4 ===
The fourth season (2006) was, yet again, a bit different. First the contestants were narrowed down to 40. Then after five shows where 2 of 8 were voted forward in each show, a sixth show was aired, where eight "wildcards" selected by the judges from all the earlier contestants competed for the two last places, making the total of finalists to 12. Before the third finalshow Iselin Andresen withdrew from the competition, and the last person to be eliminated, Audun Rensel, was given a second chance. But as he declined and Siri Helene Erland, who was originally eliminated in the very first finalshow returned instead.

Aleksander Denstad With won season four, with Jonas Thomassen coming in second. Aleksander got 55% of the votes.

=== Season 5 ===
The fifth season finished airing in December 2007 on TV2. This season the age limit was changed from 16–28 to 16–35.

The fifth season of Idol in Norway saw contestants able to perform with an instrument at any stage of the competition whereas other adaptations of Idol that have introduced live instrumentation only allow the concept at certain times during the show.

Glenn Lyse won season five, with Bjørn Johan Muri coming in second. Glenn got 57% of the votes.

=== Season 6 ===
In 2011 a sixth season was announced making the show return after being off-air for nearly four years. The age limit is again 16-35 and auditions are currently held in Oslo (18 April), Trondheim (9 May), Stavanger (16 May) and Bergen.

Jenny Langlo won season six, with Vegard Leite coming in second. Jenny got 52% of the votes.

=== Season 7 ===
In 2013, a seventh season was commissioned after a two-year break. The age limit was set to 16–35, and the show was hosted by Stian Blipp.

Siri Vølstad Jensen won season seven, with Eirik Søfteland coming in second. Astrid S placed fifth. Siri won with 55% of the received votes and became the youngest winner of Idol in Norway ever, beating previous winner Jenny Langlo by a year.

=== Season 10 ===
The tenth season of Idol took place in the fall of 2018. The show was hosted by Katarina Flatland, who is also known as a TV-show hostess from shows like "Jakten på kjærligheten" and "Sommeråpent".

The judges were Gunnar Greve (founder of MER Music), Tshawe Baqwa (from the urban pop-duo Madcon) and Silje Larsen Borgan (co-founder of Little Big Sister and Nora Collective).

The winner of the tenth season of Norwegian Idol 2018 was Øystein Hegvik, who performed the original song "Before I Go" in the final episode. The song was written by Kristin Marie Skolem, Thomas Alexander Strandskogen and Victor Karlsen Klæbo - all students at Lillehammer Institute of Music Production and Industries, also known as LIMPI. After being released, the song made it directly into Spotify's Norway Top 50 list, where it peaked at 23rd place.

=== Season 11 ===
•-•

== Judges and presenters ==
	1	2	3	4	5	6	7	8	Jr.	9	10
Judges
Jan Fredrik Karlsen											
Ole Evenrud											
Morten Ståle Nilsen											
Lena Midtveit											
Anneli Drecker											
Douglas Carr											
Thomas Strzelecki											
Tone-Lise Skagefoss											
Tor Milde											
David Eriksen											
Amund Bjørklund											
Hans Olav Grøttheim											
Asbjørn Slettemark											
Benedicte Adrian											
Mariann Thomassen											
Bertine Zetlitz											
Marion Ravn											
Hans-Erik Dyvik Husby											
Gunnar Greve Pettersen											
Tone Damli Aaberge											
Kurt Nilsen											
Esben Selvig											
Alejandro Fuentes											
Aleksander With											
Margaret Berger											
Sandra Lyng											
Ina Wroldsen											
Øyvind «Vinni» Sauvik											
Sandeep Singh											
Tshawe Baqwa											
Silje Larsen Borgan											
Hosts
Thomas Numme											
Harald Rønneberg											
Solveig Kloppen											
Ingrid Gjessing											
Kåre Magnus Bergh											
Marte Stokstad											
Kyrre Holm Johannessen											
Guri Solberg											
Ivar Johansen											
Stian Glopholm											
Ida Fladen											
Markus Bailey											
Katarina Flatland											
