= Chariot (song) =

2005 single by Gavin DeGraw

Single by Gavin DeGraw

from the album Chariot
- B-side: "W.B.T."
- Released: February 22, 2005
- Genre: Pop rock
- Length: 3:59
- Label: J
- Songwriter: Gavin DeGraw
- Producer: Gavin DeGraw

Gavin DeGraw singles chronology
"I Don't Want to Be" (2004)	"Chariot" (2005)	"Follow Through" (2005)

"Chariot" is a song by American singer-songwriter Gavin DeGraw. It appears on his 2003 debut studio album, Chariot, and was released as the album's second single in February 2005. The song addresses the overwhelming feeling Gavin felt when he moved to New York from his rural hometown; in the songs, he pleads for a metaphorical chariot to come and take him home.

Upon its release, "Chariot" peaked at number 30 on the US Billboard Hot 100 chart in July 2005 and was certified platinum by the Recording Industry Association of America (RIAA). Worldwide, the song reached the top 20 in the Netherlands and Norway and peaked at number 30 on Radio & Records' Canadian CHR/Pop Top 30 chart.

== Content ==
Gavin DeGraw said of "Chariot":

"Chariot" is a metaphorical vehicle for getting to a place in your mind that is a more broken down and laid back. It's somewhere to be just for a moment—instead of being wrapped up and living wherever you're living and consumed with what you're doing. It's a place to release and chill out.

== Music video ==
The music video for "Chariot" was directed by Zach Braff, who also directed music videos for Joshua Radin. It stars model and actress Jaime King and also features a brief cameo from Donald Faison, who plays the role of Christopher Turk in the TV show Scrubs, in which Braff is also a cast member.

== Track listing ==
European CD single

1. "Chariot" (album version) – 3:54
2. "W.B.T." – 4:31

== Charts ==
=== Weekly charts ===
Chart (2005–2006)	Peak position
Canada CHR/Pop Top 30 (Radio & Records)	30
Canada Hot AC Top 30 (Radio & Records)	8
Netherlands (Dutch Top 40)	12
Norway (VG-lista)	19
US Billboard Hot 100	30
US Adult Contemporary (Billboard)	27
US Adult Pop Airplay (Billboard)	5
US Pop Airplay (Billboard)	17

=== Year-end charts ===
Chart (2005)	Position
US Billboard Hot 100	96
US Adult Top 40 (Billboard)	18
US Mainstream Top 40 (Billboard)	59

Chart (2006)	Position
Netherlands (Dutch Top 40)	61

== Certifications ==
Region	Certification	Certified units/sales
United States (RIAA)	Platinum	1,000,000^{‡}
^{‡} Sales+streaming figures based on certification alone.
