= List of Norwegian television series =

This is a list of Norwegian television series produced and broadcast in Norway.

Title	Year	Channel	Genre	Notes
Alt for Norge	2005–present	TVNorge	Reality TV	
The Amazing Race Norge	2012–2013	TV2	Reality game show	
Amigo	2006–present	NRK	Children's TV	
Bare Brita Show	2007	TVNorge	Talkshow	Cancelled after two episodes
Beat for Beat	1999–present	NRK1	Music game show	
Bill.mrk: Bryllup	2004	TV3	Reality TV	
Blindpassasjer	1978	NRK	Sci-fi-thriller series	Released on DVD in 2007
Brennpunkt	1996–present	NRK	Documentary	Hiatus in 2007
Brigaden	2002–2003	NRK1	Drama series	
Camp Molloy	2003	TV3	Reality TV	
Charterfeber	2006	TV3	Docu-soap	
D'ække bare, bare Bernt	1996–1997	TV3	Sitcom	
Dagsrevyen	1958–present	NRK	News	Longest running Norwegian TV news programme
Dansefeber	2006–present	TVNorge	Dance competition	
Deal or No Deal	2006–present	TV 2	Game show	
Den rette for Tor	2007	TV3	Reality TV	
Den som henger i en tråd	1980	NRK	Drama	
Den store klassefesten	2000–2001 & 2005	NRK	Entertainment/game show	
Dokument 2	1992–present	TV 2	Documentary	
Ekko av Ibsen	2006	NRK1	Short film series	Broadcast in the Ibsen Year
En udødelig mann	2006	NRK1	Drama	Broadcast in the Ibsen Year
Fagerstrand	2005	TV 2	Reality TV	
Fantorangen	2007–present	NRK	Children's programme	
Farmen	2001–2004 & 2007	TV 2	Reality TV	
Fire høytider	2000	NRK1	Drama	
Fleksnes Fataliteter	1972–2002	NRK	Sitcom	Only two new episodes broadcast between 1988 and 2002
Flo, fjell og fjære: Jostein Flo utforsker Vestlandet	2001	NRK1	Nature documentary	
Gay Army	2006–present	TVNorge	Reality TV	
God kveld Norge!	1997–present	TV 2	Entertainment and VIPs	
Gudesens Conditori	1993–1995	TV 2		
Gutta på tur	1995–present	TV 2	Travel programme	
Gylne tider	2002, 2004, 2006 & 2010	TV 2	Documentary/music/retro/entertainment	
Halvseint	2007	NRK1	Animated comedy	
Harem (TV series)	2001	TV3	Reality TV	
The Heavy Water War	2015	NRK	War drama miniseries	
Heia Norge	1988–1998	NRK	General entertainment	
Heia Tufte!	2005–2006	TVNorge	Docu-soap	
Hellfjord	2012	NRK	Drama-comedy	
Herfra til evigheten	2002	NRK1	Travel programme	
Hjernevask	2010	NRK1	Science documentary miniseries	
Hodejegerne	2002–2004	NRK1	Entertainment	
Hombres	2007	TVNorge	Drama-crime series	
Hos Martin	2004–present	TV 2	Sitcom	
Hotel Cæsar	1998–present	TV 2	Soap series	
Husker du?	1971–1985	NRK	Music/entertainment	
Hvaler	2008 & 2010	TV 2	Drama	
Hver gang vi møtes	2012–present	TV 2	Reality TV	
Idol	2003–present	TV 2	Talent competition	
I kveld med Thomas Giertsen	1999	TVNorge	Talk show/comedy	
I kveld med YLVIS	2011–2016	TV 2	Talk show	
Internatet	2005	TVNorge	Reality TV	
I søkelyset	1990–1991	TVNorge	Crime documentary	
Jul i Skomakergata	1979	NRK	Children's TV (Christmas Calendar)	
Jul i Tøyengata	2006	TVNorge	Comedy	A parody on Jul i Skomakergata
Juritzen direkte	2002	TVNorge	Current affairs/debate	
Karl & Co	1998–2001	TV 2	Sitcom	
Klasse 10 B	2010	NRK	Documentary series	
Komplottet	1996–1999 & 2003	TV3	Skjult kamera	
Kråkeslottet	2002	TV3	Reality TV	
Kykelikokos	1996–2003	NRK	Children's TV	
Lenge leve livet	2001	NRK	Documentary	Doc about the group Dollie de Luxe
Lille Lørdag	1995–1996	NRK	Comedy	
Lilyhammer	2012–2014	NRK	Drama	Co-produced and distributed by NRK and Netflix
Lørdagsredaksjonen	1980–1982	NRK	Entertainment	
Mammon	2014 & 2016	NRK 1	Crime	
Migrapolis	1997–present	NRK	Factual/educational	
Mot i brøstet	1993–1997	TV 2	Sitcom	
New Scandinavian Cooking	2003–2014	AFC	Cooking	
Nissene på låven	2001	TVNorge	Comedy-christmas calendar	
Nobel	2016	NRK1	War drama	Seven episodes; also streamed on Netflix
Nytt på nytt	1999–present	NRK1	Comedy/current affairs programme	
Ođđasat	2001–present	NRK1	Sami news	
Okkupert	2015	TV 2	Political thriller	Ten episodes; also streamed on Netflix
Oljefondet	2018–2019	TVNorge	Comedy Drama	
Peking Express	2007	TVNorge	Reality TV	
Piker, vin og sang	1998	TV3	Sitcom	
Pompel og Pilt	1969	NRK	Children's TV	
Portveien 2	1985–1987	NRK	Children's TV	
Rikets tilstand	1999–2002	TV 2	Documentary	
Robinsonekspedisjonen	1999–2004 & 2007	TV3	Reality TV	
Robinson VIP	2005	TV3	Reality TV	Scandinavian co-production
Rød snø	1985	NRK	Thriller	
Sesam Stasjon	1991–2000	NRK	Children's TV	
Singel 24-7	2004	TV3	Reality TV	
Skal vi danse?	2006–present	TV 2	Dance competition	
Skam	2015–2017	NRK	Young adult	
Starshot	1991–1993	TVNorge	Reality TV/competition	
The Stream	2016–present	TV 2	Singing competition	
Team Antonsen	2004	NRK1	Comedy	
Televimsen	1966	NRK	Animated comedy	
The Third Eye	2014 & 2016	TV 2	Crime drama	
Top Model Norge	2006–2013	TV3	Reality TV/competition	
Tore på sporet	1996–2015	NRK1	Entertainment	
Tre brødre som ikke er brødre	2005	NRK1	Comedy series	
TV-aksjonen	1974–present	NRK	Annual charity show	Live broadcasting
Typisk norsk	2004–2006	NRK1	Comedy	
Undercover Boss Norge	2011	TV 2	Reality TV	
Urix	2002–present	NRK2 & NRK1	Current events and foreign policy	
Uti vår hage	2003 & 2008	NRK1	Comedy	
Valen TV	2003	TVNorge	Comedy	
Vil du bli millionær?	2000–2011	TV 2	Game show	
Våg og vinn	1997	TV3	Game show	
X Factor	2009–2010	TV 2	Music talent competition	
Åpen Post	1998–1999, 2001–2002	NRK1	Comedy	
