= List of programs broadcast by TV3 in Norway =

This is a list of programs that have been or are being broadcast by TV3 (Viasat) on its Norwegian channel.

== 0-9 ==
Original title	Country	Norwegian title	Genre	IMDb
100 Questions	USA		Comedy	
The 13 Ghosts of Scooby-Doo	USA		Animation	IMDb
1-800-Missing	CAN	Missing	Police procedural	IMDb
20 Good Years	USA		Sitcom	IMDb
21 Jump Street	USA			IMDb
24 Karat	NOR		Contest	
3 bryllup	NOR		Reality TV	
The 4400	USA		Science fiction	IMDb
48 Hours	USA	48 timer	Journalism	IMDb
8 Simple Rules	USA		Sitcom	IMDb

== A ==
Original title	Country	Norwegian title	Genre	IMDb
The A-Team	USA		Action	IMDb
According to Jim	USA		Sitcom	IMDb
Action	USA		Comedy	
The Addams Family	USA		Animation	IMDb
Alias Smith and Jones	USA		Western	
Afterworld	GBR		Science fiction	
The Agency	USA			IMDb
Air America	USA		Action	
Airwolf	USA		Action	IMDb
Alarmen går	NOR		Documentary	
Alias	USA			IMDb
Alias Smith and Jones	USA		Western	
Ally McBeal	USA		Comedy drama	IMDb
The Amazing Race	USA		Reality TV	IMDb
American Dad!	USA		Animation	IMDb
American Gladiators	USA		Sports entertainment	
America's Dumbest Criminals	USA		Satire	IMDb
America's Funniest Home Videos	USA	Full Rulle	Videos	IMDb
America's Next Top Model	USA	Top Model	Reality TV	IMDb
The Andromeda Strain	USA		Science fiction	
The Anna Nicole Show	USA		Documentary	IMDb
Any Human Heart	UK		Drama	
Are You Smarter than a 5th Grader?	USA	Er du smartere enn en 10 åring?	Game show	
Argus	NOR			
Arkivet	NOR		Comedy	
Arrested Development	USA		Comedy	IMDb
As If	GBR		Drama	IMDb
Ask Harriet	USA		Sitcom	IMDb
Australia's Next Top Model	AUS	Top Model Australia	Reality TV	

== B ==
Original title	Country	Norwegian title	Genre	IMDb
Back to You	USA		Sitcom	IMDb
Baren	NOR		Reality TV	
Baren Direkte	NOR		Reality TV talkshow	
Baywatch	USA		Drama	IMDb
The Beast	USA		Crime drama	
Beauty and the Geek	USA		Reality TV	IMDb
The Benny Hill Show	GBR		Sketch show	IMDb
Bette	USA		Sitcom	IMDb
Better with You	USA		Sitcom	
Beverly Hills, 90210	USA		Drama	IMDb
Beyond Belief: Fact or Fiction	USA		Anthology	IMDb
Big Shots	USA		Comedy	IMDb
Biker Mice From Mars	USA		Animation	IMDb
Bill.mrk: Bryllup	NOR		Reality TV	
Bionic Woman	USA		Action drama	
Blossom	USA	Familiens Blomst	Sitcom	IMDb
Bobby's World	USA	Bobbys Verden	Animation	IMDb
Bones	USA		Crime	IMDb
Boondocks	USA		Animation	
The Border	CAN		Drama	
Boston Legal	USA		Legal drama	IMDb
Britain's Next Top Model	GBR	Top Model UK	Reality TV	
Britain's Worst Driver	GBR		Reality TV	
Britney and Kevin: Chaotic	USA	Britney Spears og Kevin	Documentary	IMDb
Brothers	USA		Sitcom	
Burn Notice	USA			IMDb

== C ==
Original title	Country	Norwegian title	Genre	IMDb
Camp Molloy	NOR		Reality TV	
Canada's Next Top Model	CAN	Top Model Canada	Reality TV	
Caroline in the City	USA	Caroline i Storbyen	Sitcom	IMDb
Cash Cab (Norwegian version)	NOR		Game show	
Casino	NOR		Game show	IMDb
Celeb Poker	USA		Contest	IMDb
Celebert Selskap	NOR		Food	
Chains of Love	USA	Sexy Lenker	Reality TV	IMDb
Charlie's Angels	USA		Crime	IMDb
Charmed	USA		Drama	IMDb
Charterfeber	NOR		Documentary	
Cheaters	USA		Documentary	
Cheers	USA		Sitcom	
Chip 'n Dale Rescue Rangers	USA	Snipp og Snapp - Redningspatruljen	Animation	IMDb
Clifford the Big Red Dog (Upcoming)	USA	Clifford Den store røde hunden	Animation	
Chuck	USA		Action-comedy	
The Class	USA		Sitcom	IMDb
Cleopatra 2525	USA		Science fiction	IMDb
Close to Home	USA		Legal drama	IMDb
Coach	USA		Sitcom	IMDb
Columbo	USA		Crime	
Come Dine with Me	UK		Food	
Community	USA		Comedy	
COPS	USA		Documentary	IMDb
Cover Me: Based on the True Life of an FBI Family	USA	Cover Me	Crime drama	IMDb
Cow and Chicken	USA	Ku og Kylling	Animation	IMDb
Crusoe	USA		Drama	
Cupid	USA		Comedy	IMDb

== D ==
Original title	Country	Norwegian title	Genre	IMDb
D'ække bare, bare Bernt	NOR		Sitcom	IMDb
Dad Camp	USA		Reality TV	
Dagens Mann	NOR		Dating show	
Damages	NOR		Legal drama	
Damon	USA		Comedy	IMDb
Dance Your Ass Off	USA		Reality TV	
Darkwing Duck	USA		Animation	IMDb
Dawson's Creek	USA		Drama	IMDb
The Day of the Triffids	UK		Science fiction	
Days of Our Lives	USA	I gode og onde dager	Soap opera	IMDb
Deadliest Catch	USA		Reality TV	
Dekor Inne/Ute	NOR		Home renovation	
Den rette for Tor	NOR		Reality TV	
Design Star	USA	Interiørstjerner	Reality TV	
Designerspirene (Norwegian version of Project Runway)	NOR		Reality TV	
Det blir bedre	NOR		Documentary	
Det norske hus	NOR		Journalism	
Det perfekte kupp	NOR		Contest	
Dexter	USA		Thriller	IMDb
Dexter's Laboratory	USA	Dexters Laboratorium	Animation	IMDb
Digimon: Digital Monsters		Digimon	Animation	IMDb
Dilbert	USA		Animation	IMDb
Dirty Dancing: The Time of Your Life	USA		Reality TV	
Doc	USA	Doktor Cassidy	Medical drama	IMDb
Dokument 3	NOR		Documentary	
Dr. Phil	USA		Talkshow	IMDb
Dr. Vegas	USA		Medical drama	IMDb
Dragnet	USA		Crime	IMDb
Dream On	USA		Comedy	IMDb
The Drew Carey Show	USA		Sitcom	IMDb
Drop Dead Diva	USA		Drama	
Du er hva du spiser	NOR		Reality TV	
Du velger filmen	NOR		Interactive TV show	
Duckman	USA		Animation	IMDb
DuckTales	USA	Ole, Dole og Doffen på nye eventyr	Animation	IMDb

== E ==
Original title	Country	Norwegian title	Genre	IMDb
E-Ring	USA			IMDb
E! True Hollywood Story	USA	True Hollywood Story	Documentary	
Early Edition	USA	Morgenutgaven	Drama	IMDb
Earthworm Jim	USA		Animation	IMDb
Eastwick	USA		Supernatural drama	
Ed, Edd n Eddy	USA		Animation	IMDb
Eek! The Cat	USA		Animation	IMDb
Ekstrem oppussing (Norwegian version of Extreme Makeover: Home Edition)	NOR		Reality TV	
Eleventh Hour	UK		Drama	
Elisas univers	NOR		Talkshow	
The Ellen Show	USA		Sitcom	IMDb
Emily's Reasons Why Not	USA	Emilys grunner til ikke	Comedy	
En annen Verden	NOR			
Enstemmig (Norwegian version of Unan1mous)	NOR		Reality TV	
Entourage	USA		Comedy drama	IMDb
ER	USA	Akutten	Medical drama	IMDb
ESU	USA	Spesialstyrken	Documentary	
Etterlyst	NOR			
The Event	USA		Drama	
Everwood	USA		Drama	IMDb
Everybody Loves Raymond	USA	Alle elsker Raymond	Sitcom	IMDb
Extra	NOR		Journalism	
Extreme Makeover: Home Edition	USA	Ekstrem oppussing	Reality TV	IMDb
Extreme Male Beauty	UK		Documentary	

== F ==
Original title	Country	Norwegian title	Genre	IMDb
Falcone	USA		Crime drama	
Fame	USA		Drama	IMDb
Fame Factory (Norwegian version)	NOR		Reality TV	
Family Guy	USA	Familien Griffin	Animation	IMDb
Family Law	USA		Legal drama	IMDb
Family Matters	USA	Steve	Sitcom	
Fangene på fortet	NOR		Contest	IMDb
Fantasy Island	USA		Drama	IMDb
Fear Factor	USA		Reality TV	IMDb
Fear Factor (Norwegian version)	NOR		Reality TV	IMDb
Fear Itself	USA		Horror anthology	
Felicity	USA		Drama	IMDb
Feta Svenskar	SWE	De fete svenskene	Documentary	
The Flintstones	USA	Familien Flintstone	Animation	IMDb
For Love or Money	USA	Rik eller Lykkelig	Reality TV	IMDb
Forever Eden	USA		Reality TV	IMDb
Fristet	NOR		Reality TV	
Frogner	NOR		Documentary	
Fullt hus	NOR			

== G ==
Original title	Country	Norwegian title	Genre	IMDb
Gal kanal	NOR			
Garfield and Friends	USA		Animation	IMDb
George Lopez	USA		Sitcom	IMDb
The George Wendt Show	USA	På lufta med George Wendt	Sitcom	IMDb
Glem ikke tannbørsten	NOR		Game show	
Going to California	USA	Reisen til California		IMDb
The Golden Girls	USA	Pantertanter	Sitcom	IMDb
Goof Troop	USA	Langbein & Sønn	Animation	IMDb
Gordon's Great Escape	UK		Food	
Gossip SEHER	NOR		Entertainment news	
Grosse Pointe	USA		Comedy	IMDb
The Guardian	USA		Legal drama	IMDb
Guinness Rekord-TV	NOR		Competition	
Guinness World Records Smashed	GBR		Competition	

== H ==
Original title	Country	Norwegian title	Genre	IMDb
Hannah	SWE		Talkshow	
Happily Divorced	USA	Lykkelig skilt	Comedy	IMDb
Harem	NOR		Reality TV	IMDb
Hart to Hart	USA	Par I Hjerter		IMDb
Hawthorne	USA		Medical drama	
He-Man and the Masters of the Universe	USA	He-Man	Animation	IMDb
HeliCops – Einsatz über Berlin	GER		Action	
Hell's Kitchen	USA		Reality TV	IMDb
Hellstrøm Inviterer	NOR		Food	
Hellstrøm rydder opp	NOR		Food	
Help Me Help You	USA		Comedy drama	IMDb
Helse og velvære	NOR		Health	
Hercules: The Legendary Journeys	USA	Herkules	Adventure	IMDb
He's a Lady			Reality TV	IMDb
Hex	GBR		Supernatural	
Hidden Palms	USA		Drama	IMDb
Hjelp, han pusser opp!	NOR		Reality TV	
Hjelp, jeg er med i et japansk gameshow!	NOR		Reality TV	
Hjemme hos Paus	NOR		Talkshow	IMDb
Hoarders	USA	Ekstreme samlere	Documentary	
Hollywood Uncensored	USA		Infotainment	
Home Improvement	USA	Ti Tommeltotter	Sitcom	IMDb
Homsepatruljen (Norwegian version of Queer Eye for the Straight Guy)	USA			
Honey, I Shrunk the Kids: The TV Show	USA	Kjære, jeg krympet barna	Comedy	IMDb
Hot in Cleveland	USA		Sitcom	
Hot Properties	USA		Sitcom	IMDb
Hotell Syden	NOR		Documentary	
How I Met Your Mother	USA		Sitcom	IMDb
How the West Was Won	USA	Familien Macahan	Western	IMDb
Huff	USA		Comedy	IMDb

== I ==
Original title	Country	Norwegian title	Genre	IMDb
I Survived a Japanese Game Show	USA		Reality TV	
I'm with Her	USA		Sitcom	IMDb
In Plain Sight	USA		Drama	
The Inside	USA		Crime drama	IMDb
It's Always Sunny in Philadelphia	USA		Comedy	

== J ==
Original title	Country	Norwegian title	Genre	IMDb
Ja - vi elsker	NOR		Reality TV	
JAG	USA		Drama	IMDb
James Bond Junior	USA		Animation	IMDb
The Jamie Kennedy Experiment	USA		Hidden camera	IMDb
Jerry Springer	USA		Talkshow	IMDb
Joan of Arcadia	USA		Religious drama	IMDb
Joe Schmo Show	USA		Reality TV	IMDb
Johnny Bravo	USA		Animation	IMDb
Jonny Quest	USA		Animation	IMDb
Journeyman	USA		Science fiction	IMDb
Just Shoot Me!	USA	Blush	Sitcom	IMDb

== K ==
Original title	Country	Norwegian title	Genre	IMDb
Kath & Kim	USA		Comedy	
Killer Instinct	USA			IMDb
The King of Queens	USA	Kongen av Queens	Sitcom	IMDb
Kingdom Hospital	USA		Horror	IMDb
Kings	USA		Drama	
Kitchen Burnout	GBR	Marco's Kitchen Burnout	Reality TV	
Kitchen Confidential	USA		Comedy	IMDb
Knight Rider	USA		Action	IMDb
Knight Rider (2008)	USA		Action	
Kojak	USA		Crime drama	
Komplottet	NOR		Hidden camera	IMDb
Konebytte (Norwegian version of Wife Swap)	NOR		Reality TV	
Kråkeslottet	NOR		Reality TV	IMDb
Kvinnene på taket	NOR		Talkshow	

== L ==
Original title	Country	Norwegian title	Genre	IMDb
L.A. Doctors	USA	LA Docs	Medical drama	IMDb
L.A. Firefighters	USA		Drama	IMDb
The L Word	USA		Drama	IMDb
La Femme Nikita	CAN	Nikita	Action drama	
Landskampen	NOR SWE		Competition	
LAPD: Life on the Beat	USA	LAPD	Documentary	
Las Vegas	USA		Drama	IMDb
Law & Order	USA	Lov og Orden	Police procedural	IMDb
Law & Order: LA	USA		Police procedural	
Life	USA		Crime drama	
Life of Luxury	USA	Luksusliv	Documentary	IMDb
Lipstick Jungle	USA		Comedy-drama	
Listen Up	USA		Sitcom	IMDb
Little House on the Prairie	USA	Huset pa Prærien	Drama	IMDb
The Loop	USA		Comedy	
The Lost Room	USA		Science fiction	
Love Cruise	USA		Reality TV	IMDb
Love Monkey	USA		Comedy	IMDb
Lucky	USA		Comedy drama	IMDb
Luksusfellen	NOR		Reality TV	
Lykkehjulet (Norwegian version of Wheel of Fortune)	NOR		Game show	IMDb

== M ==
Original title	Country	Norwegian title	Genre	IMDb
Mad About You	USA		Sitcom	IMDb
Mad Love	USA		Sitcom	
Mad Men	USA		Drama	
Made in L.A.				
Mamma søker kjæreste	NOR		Reality TV	
Manhattan on the Beach				IMDb
Mann Oh! Mann	NOR		Contest	
Married to the Kellys	USA	Gift med Svigers	Sitcom	IMDb
Married... with Children	USA	Bundy	Sitcom	IMDb
The Mask: Animated Series	USA	Masken	Animation	IMDb
Masterchef Australia	AUS		Reality TV	
Maybe It's Me	USA	Livet med Molly	Comedy	IMDb
Mayday Mayday	NOR		Documentary	
Max Steel	USA		Animation	IMDb
Med blikket på stjernene	NOR			
Meet Mister Mom				IMDb
Melrose Place	USA		Drama	IMDb
Memphis Beat	USA		Comedy-drama	
Men in Trees	USA		Comedy	IMDb
The Mentalist	USA		Crime drama	
Mercy	USA		Medical drama	
Miami Vice	USA		Crime drama	IMDb
Michael Hayes	USA		Legal drama	IMDb
The Middle	USA		Comedy	
Mike & Molly	USA		Sitcom	
Mike Hammer, Private Eye	USA	Mike Hammer	Crime drama	
Minibaren	NOR		Reality TV	
Minitimen	NOR			
Miracle Workers	USA		Reality TV	
Miss Match	USA		Comedy	IMDb
Moloney	USA		Drama	IMDb
Monty Python's Flying Circus	GBR		Sketch show	IMDb
Moonlight	USA			IMDb
More to Love	USA		Reality TV	
Mork and Mindy	USA		Sitcom	IMDb
Motebildet	NOR		Fashion	
Mr. Bogus	USA		Animation	IMDb
Mr. Sunshine	USA		Comedy	
The Munsters Today	USA	Familien Munster	Sitcom	
Murder, She Wrote	USA	Jessica Fletcher	Crime	IMDb
Murphy Brown	USA		Sitcom	
My Boys	USA		Comedy	IMDb
My Name Is Earl	USA		Comedy	
MXC	USA	MXC: Japansk galskap	Comedy	
Mysterious Ways	USA			IMDb
Møte med det ukjente	NOR			

== N ==
Original title	Country	Norwegian title	Genre	IMDb
The Nanny	USA	Nanny	Sitcom	IMDb
Nannyhjelpen	USA		Reality TV	
Nash Bridges	USA		Police procedural	IMDb
Neighbours	AUS	Naboer	Soap opera	IMDb
The New Adventures of Robin Hood	USA	Robin Hood pa nye eventyr	Adventure	IMDb
New Amsterdam	USA		Drama	
The New Lassie	USA	Lassie	Family	
The Twilight Zone (1985–1989)	USA		Horror	
New Zealand's Next Top Model	NZL	Top Model New Zealand	Reality TV	
NCIS	USA		Police procedural	IMDb
NCIS: Los Angeles	USA		Police procedural	
Nightmares and Dreamscapes: From the Stories of Stephen King	USA	Nightmares and Dreamscapes		
The Nine	USA		Drama	IMDb
Nip/Tuck	USA		Drama	IMDb
Norges styggeste rom	NOR		Home renovation	
North Shore	USA		Drama	IMDb
Northern Exposure	USA	Livet i Alaska	Comedy-drama	
Norway's Next Top Model	NOR		Reality TV	
Nr. 15	NOR		Reality TV	
Nynne	DEN		Comedy	IMDb

== O ==
Original title	Country	Norwegian title	Genre	IMDb
The O.C.	USA		Drama	IMDb
Once and Again	USA		Drama	IMDb
The Oprah Winfrey Show	USA	Oprah	Talkshow	IMDb
Otnes live	NOR			
Over streken	NOR			
Oz	USA	Oz-Livet bak murene	Prison drama	IMDb

== P ==
Original title	Country	Norwegian title	Genre	IMDb
Paradise Beach	AUS		Soap opera	IMDb
Paradise Hotel Norway	NOR		Reality TV	
Paragraf 9	SWE		Drama	
Parenthood	USA		Comedy-drama	
Paris Hilton's British Best Friend	UK		Reality TV	
Paris Hilton's My New BFF	USA	Paris Hilton BFF - Jakten på en bestevenn	Reality TV	
Penger for livet	NOR		Game show	
Piker, vin og sang	NOR		Sitcom	IMDb
The Pink Panther			Animation	IMDb
The PJs	USA		Animation	IMDb
Players	USA		Crime drama	
Plonsters			Animation	
Point Pleasant	USA		Mystery	IMDb
Police Academy	USA	Politiskolen	Animation	IMDb
Police Academy	USA	Politiskolen	Comedy	IMDb
Police Rescue	AUS		Action drama	IMDb
Popstars	NOR		Reality TV	
Popular	USA	Livet på Kennedy High	Comedy drama	IMDb
Power Rangers	USA		Adventure	IMDb
The Powerpuff Girls	USA	Powerpuffjentene	Drama	IMDb
Praksisjobben	NOR		Contest	
Pregnant in Heels	USA		Reality TV	
Presidio Med	USA		Medica drama	IMDb
Prison Break	USA		Prison drama	IMDb
Proffdrømmen	NOR		Reality TV	
Project Runway	USA		Reality TV	IMDb
Psyk forandring	NOR		Reality TV	
A Pup Named Scooby-Doo	USA		Animation	IMDb
Pushing Daisies	USA		Comedy-drama	
På G	NOR		Talkshow	

== Q ==
Original title	Country	Norwegian title	Genre	IMDb
Queer Eye for the Straight Girl	USA		Makeover	IMDb
Queer Eye for the Straight Guy	USA	Homsepatruljen USA	Makeover	IMDb
Quintuplets	USA		Sitcom	IMDb

== R ==
Original title	Country	Norwegian title	Genre	IMDb
The Real Housewives of Beverly Hills	USA		Documentary	
The Real Housewives of D.C.	USA		Documentary	
The Real Housewives of New York City	USA		Documentary	
The Real Housewives of Orange County	USA	Ekte frusrerte fruer	Documentary	IMDb
The Real Sex and the City LA	USA	Singel I L.A.	Documentary	
The Real Sex in the City	USA	Singel I New York	Documentary	
Reality Bites Back	USA		Reality TV	
Reba	USA		Sitcom	IMDb
The Rebel Billionaire: Branson's Quest for the Best	USA	Bransons Utvalgte	Reality TV	IMDb
Renovate My Family	USA	Hjelp familien min!	Reality TV	IMDb
Rescue 77	USA		Drama	
Rescue Me	USA		Comedy drama	IMDb
The Restaurant	USA	Roccos Restaurant	Documentary	IMDb
The Return of Jezebel James	USA		Sitcom	
The Riches	USA		Comedy	IMDb
Richie Rich	USA		Animation	
Ricki Lake	USA		Talkshow	IMDb
Robinsonekspedisjonen	USA		Reality TV	IMDb
Rock Me Baby	USA		Sitcom	IMDb
Romantically Challenged	USA		Sitcom	
Royal Pains	USA		Medical drama	
Ruby Wax Meets	GBR		Talkshow	
Runaway	USA		Drama	IMDb
Running in Heels	USA		Reality TV	

== S ==
Original title	Country	Norwegian title	Genre	IMDb
Sabrina, the Animated Series	USA	Sabrina	Animation	IMDb
Sabrina, the Teenage Witch	USA	Heksen Sabrina	Sitcom	IMDb
Safari	NOR		Travel	
Sangstjerner	NOR		Contest	
Santa Barbara	USA		Soap opera	IMDb
Saturday Night Live	USA		Sketch show	IMDb
Saved	USA		Medical drama	IMDb
Saved by the Bell	USA	Skulk	Sitcom	IMDb
Saving Grace	USA		Crime drama	
Scandinavia's Next Top Model	NOR SWE DEN		Reality TV	
Scooby-Doo, Where Are You!	USA		Animation	IMDb
Scrubs	USA	Helt sykt	Comedy	IMDb
Secrets of the Ocean Realm	GBR		Documentary	
Seinfeld	USA		Sitcom	IMDb
Sen kveld med Thyvold	NOR		Talkshow	
Seven Days	USA	Syv dager	Science fiction	
Sex and the City	USA	Sex og Singelliv	Comedy drama	IMDb
The Sex Inspectors	GBR		Erotic	IMDb
Sex, Love & Secrets	USA		Drama	
SexOrama	NOR		Erotic	IMDb
Sexskolen	NOR		Erotic	
Shark	USA		Legal drama	IMDb
Shasta	USA		Comedy	IMDb
Sheena	USA		Adventure	IMDb
The Shield	USA		Action drama	IMDb
Shopaholic	NOR		Reality TV	
The Simple Life	USA		Reality TV	
The Simpsons	USA		Animation	IMDb
Singel 24-7	NOR		Reality TV	
Singel 24-7 Direkte	NOR		Reality talkshow	
Singel søker	NOR		Reality TV	
The Singing Bee (Norwegian version)	NOR		Contest	
Sister Said	GBR		Music comedy	IMDb
Snutter	NOR		Home videos	
Soap	USA		Sitcom	IMDb
Spesialenheten	NOR		Crime drama	
Sports Night	USA		Comedy drama	IMDb
Stacked	USA		Sitcom	IMDb
Standoff	USA		Drama	IMDb
Stargate Atlantis	USA		Science fiction	
Stargate SG-1	USA		Science fiction	IMDb
The Starter Wife	USA		Comedy drama	
Still Standing	USA		Sitcom	IMDb
Straight dates by gay mates	USA	Datingekspressen	Dating show	IMDb
The $treet	USA	Wall $treet	Drama	
Stripperkongens Piger	DEN	Strippekongens Piker	Documentary	IMDb
Strong Medicine	USA		Medical drama	IMDb
Studio 60 on the Sunset Strip	USA	Studio 60	Comedy drama	IMDb
Stylista	USA		Reality TV	
Suburban Shootout	GBR	Kvinnemafiaen	Comedy	IMDb
Suddenly Susan	USA	Se opp for Susan	Sitcom	IMDb
Sue Thomas: F.B.Eye	CAN USA		Crime drama	
Superstars	NOR			
SuperTed	NOR		Animation	IMDb
Survivor	USA		Reality TV	IMDb
The Swan	USA		Reality TV	IMDb
Sweet Valley High	USA		Comedy drama	IMDb
Sykehuset	NOR		Documentary	

== T ==
Original title	Country	Norwegian title	Genre	IMDb
T. J. Hooker	USA		Police procedural	IMDb
Team Knight Rider	USA		Action	IMDb
Teenage Mutant Ninja Turtles (1987 series)	USA		Animation	IMDb
Texas S.W.A.T.	USA		Documentary	IMDb
There's Something About Miriam	GBR		Reality TV	
Thunder in Paradise	USA		Action	IMDb
ThunderCats	USA		Animation	IMDb
The Tick	USA		Animation	IMDb
The Tick (2001)	USA		Comedy	
'Til Death	USA		Sitcom	IMDb
Tilgi meg	NOR		Talkshow	
Time of Your Life	USA		Drama	
Tjuefjerde	NOR		Sitcom	
Tom and Jerry	USA		Animation	
Tough Love	USA		Reality TV	
The Tracey Ullman Show	USA	Tracey Ullmann-show	Sketch show	IMDb
Transformers Energon	USA		Animation	IMDb
Tremors	USA		Horror	IMDb
True Hollywood Story	USA		Documentary	IMDb
Turks	USA	Politiliv i Chicago	Crime drama	
Tvert imot	NOR		Debate	
TV's Bloopers & Practical Jokes	USA			IMDb
Twice in a Lifetime	USA		Drama	IMDb
Twin Peaks	USA		Mystery	IMDb
Two and a Half Men	USA		Sitcom	IMDb
The Tyra Banks Show	USA		Talkshow	

== U ==
Original title	Country	Norwegian title	Genre	IMDb
Ultimate Book of Spells	USA		Animation	IMDb
The Ultimate Love Test	USA		Reality TV	IMDb
Unan1mous	USA	Unanimous	Reality TV	IMDb
The Unexplained	USA	Det Uforklarlige	Paranormal documentary	IMDb
Unforgettable	USA		Crime drama	
Unhappily Ever After	USA	Evig Ulykkelig	Sitcom	IMDb
The Unit	USA		Action	IMDb
Unscripted	USA		Comedy	IMDb
The Unusuals	USA		Comedy-drama	

== V ==
Original title	Country	Norwegian title	Genre	IMDb
V.I.P.	USA		Action	IMDb
Vanished	USA		Drama	IMDb
Vanishing Son	USA		Adventure drama	IMDb
Vicky the Viking	JPN	Vikingen Vikke	Animasjon	
Ville vesten	NOR		Reality TV	
Våg og vinn	NOR		Contest	IMDb

== W ==
Original title	Country	Norwegian title	Genre	IMDb
Walker, Texas Ranger	USA		Action	IMDb
The Waltons	USA	Familien Walton	Drama	IMDb
Watching Ellie	USA		Comedy	IMDb
The Weber Show	USA		Sitcom	
Weeds	USA		Comedy	IMDb
What About Joan	USA		Sitcom	IMDb
Wife Swap	USA		Reality TV	IMDb
Windfall	USA			IMDb
Women's Murder Club	USA		Crime drama	
Work With Me	USA	Advokater i tykt og tynt	Sitcom	
The World According to Paris	USA		Documentary	
World's Wildest Police Videos	USA	Verdens Villeste Politivideoer	Documentary	IMDb

== X ==
Original title	Country	Norwegian title	Genre	IMDb
Xena: Warrior Princess	USA		Adventure	IMDb

== Y ==
Original title	Country	Norwegian title	Genre	IMDb
Yes, Dear	USA		Sitcom	
Young Americans	USA		Drama	IMDb
Young Hercules	USA	Unge Herkules	Adventure	IMDb
The Young Indiana Jones Chronicles	USA		Adventure	IMDb

== Ø ==
Original title	Country	Norwegian title	Genre	IMDb
Ønskebrønnen	NOR			
