= List of programs broadcast by the Norwegian Broadcasting Corporation =

This is a list of some programs that have been or are being broadcast by Norwegian Broadcasting Corporation (NRK) (Norwegian: Norsk rikskringkasting) on the NRK1, NRK2, NRK3 or NRK Super television channels. Included are national radio programs. The list is incomplete. There may be many years ago that the programs were shown.

== 0-9 ==
Original title	Country	Norwegian title	Genre	IMDb
3 Friends and Jerry	GBR SWE	De tre vennene og Jerry	animation	IMDb
30 Rock	USA		comedy	IMDb
100% Greve	DEN		documentary	IMDb
101 Dalmatians: The Series	USA	101 Dalmatinere	animation	IMDb
12 bud	NOR		religious documentary	
20 Spørsmål	NOR		entertainment	
4-4-2: Fotball	NOR		sports	

== A ==
Original title	Country	Norwegian title	Genre	IMDb
A Pup Named Scooby-Doo	USA	Valpen Scooby-Doo	animation	IMDb
A Touch of Frost	GBR	Detektiv Jack Frost	crime	IMDb
Absalons hemmelighed	DEN	Absalons hemmelighet	Christmas calendar	IMDb
Absolutely Fabulous	GBR	Absolutt fabelaktig	situation comedy	IMDb
Absolutt norsk	NOR		music	
Adamseplene: Full pupp	NOR		sketch show	IMDb
The Adventures of Jimmy Neutron, Boy Genius	USA	Jimmy Neutron	animation	IMDb
Akkurat nå	NOR		sketch show	IMDb
Alas Smith and Jones	GBR	Smith og Jones	sketch show	IMDb
Aldri på en lørdag	NOR		talk show	IMDb
Alf Prøysen	NOR		documentary	
Alfred Hitchcock Presents	USA	Alfred Hitchcock presenterer	anthology	IMDb
All About Animals	GBR	Digge Dyr	nature	
'Allo 'Allo!	GBR		situation comedy	IMDb
Alltid beredt	NOR		documentary	
Amalies jul	NOR		Christmas calendar	IMDb
Amandas Mexico	NOR		drama	
Amigo	NOR		children	
Angelina Ballerina	GBR		animation	IMDb
Anna Holt – polis	SWE		police procedural	IMDb
Anne of Green Gables	GBR	Anne fra Bjørkely	animation	IMDb
Anno domini	NOR		game show	IMDb
Ansikt til ansikt	NOR		documentary	IMDb
Antenne Ti	NOR		talk show	IMDb
Antikviteter & snurrepiperier	NOR		antiques	IMDb
Are You Afraid of the Dark?	CAN USA		horror anthology	IMDb
As Told by Ginger	USA	Ginger	animation	IMDb
Asle Søberg, 29	NOR		animation	
Aspirantarna	SWE		crime	IMDb
Auschwitz: The Nazis and the 'Final Solution'	GBR		documentary	IMDb
Autofil	NOR		automotive	
avd: Barn	NOR		documentary	
The Awful Truth	USA	Michael Moores USA	documentary	IMDb

== B ==
Original title	Country	Norwegian title	Genre	IMDb
Baby Blues	USA		animation	IMDb
Baby Looney Tunes	USA		animation	IMDb
Bak fasaden	NOR		documentary	
Bak lukkede dører	NOR			
Bam's Unholy Union	USA		documentary	IMDb
Band of Brothers	USA	Krigens brorskap	drama	IMDb
Bare blåbær	NOR		nature	
Barnas superjul	NOR		children	
Barnas supershow	NOR		children	
Battlestar Galactica	USA		science fiction	IMDb
Bear in the Big Blue House	USA	Bjørnen i det Store Blå Huset	family	IMDb
Beat for beat	NOR		music	IMDb
Berlin, Berlin	GER		comedy	IMDb
Berlinerpoplene	NOR		drama	IMDb
Berserk til Valhall	NOR			
Bert and Ernie's Great Adventures	USA	Bernt og Erling på nye eventyr	animation	
Berulfsens fargerike	NOR		documentary	
Berulfsens pengebinge	NOR		documentary	
Beetle Bailey	USA	Billy	animation	IMDb
Bla, bla, bla	NOR		satire	IMDb
Blackpool	GBR		comedy	IMDb
Bleak House	GBR		drama	IMDb
Blender	NOR		children	
Blindpassasjer	NOR		Science fiction	IMDb
Bokbadet	NOR		literature	IMDb
Bokprogrammet	NOR		literature	
Borettslaget	NOR		comedy	IMDb
Borgen skole - klasse 7B og 4A	NOR		comedy drama	
Brandy & Mr. Whiskers	USA	Brandy og herr Visvas	animation	IMDb
Brennpunkt	NOR		investigative journalism	
Briefe von Felix	GER	Brev fra Felix	animation	IMDb
Brigaden	NOR		drama	IMDb
Brobyggerne	NOR		religion	IMDb
Brum	GBR	Den vesle bilen Brum	family	IMDb
Brød og sirkus	NOR		debate	IMDb
Brødrene Dal og legenden om Atlant-Is	NOR		comedy	IMDb
Brødrene Dal og mysteriet med Karl XIIs gamasjer	NOR		comedy	IMDb
Brødrene Dal og professor Drøvels hemmelighet	NOR		comedy	IMDb
Brødrene Dal og spektralsteinene	NOR		comedy	IMDb
Bull	USA	Meglerne på Wall Street	drama	IMDb
Båtliv	NOR		documentary	

== C ==
Original title	Country	Norwegian title	Genre	IMDb
Call to Greatness	USA		reality television	IMDb
Campingliv	NOR		documentary	IMDb
Canada på tvers med Lars Monsen	NOR		nature	IMDb
Carnivàle	USA		drama	IMDb
Catterick	GBR		situation comedy	IMDb
Chez toi	NOR		comedy	IMDb
Cidade dos Homens	BRA	City of Men	drama	IMDb
Clara Sheller	FRA		comedy	IMDb
Clifford the Big Red Dog	USA	Clifford	animation	IMDb
Coachen	SWE		drama	IMDb
Code Lyoko	FRA	Lyoko	animation (normal and CGI)	IMDb
Cold Feet	GBR	Kalde føtter	comedy drama	IMDb
Conviction	USA	Juristane	legal drama	IMDb
Cosmomind	DEN FIN; NOR SWE		documentary	IMDb
Coupling	GBR		situation comedy	IMDb
Creature Comforts	GBR		animation	IMDb

== D ==
Original title	Country	Norwegian title	Genre	IMDb
Da Capo	NOR		music	IMDb
The Daily Show with Jon Stewart	USA	Jon Stewart	talk show	IMDb
Dallas	USA		soap opera	IMDb
Dalziel and Pascoe	GBR	Dalziel og Pascoe	crime	IMDb
DanceLife	USA		reality television	IMDb
Danny Phantom	USA	Fantom-Danny	animation	IMDb
The Darling Buds of May	GBR	Livet med Larkins	comedy	IMDb
De drabbade	SWE	De besatte	thriller	IMDb
Den 5:e kvinnan	SWE	Den 5. kvinnen	crime	IMDb
Den gyldne pil	DEN NOR; SWE		game show	IMDb
Den store klassefesten	NOR		entertainment	IMDb
Der ingen skulle tru at nokon kunne bu	NOR		documentary	IMDb
Det svakeste ledd (Norwegian version of The Weakest Link)	NOR		game show	
Dinosapien	USA CAN	Dinosapiens	action adventure	IMDb
Dinosaurs	USA		family	IMDb
Dinotopia	USA		adventure	IMDb
Direkte lykke	NOR		satire	IMDb
House of Mouse	USA	Mikkes klubbhus	animation	IMDb
Doc Martin	GBR		drama comedy	IMDb
DR-Derude: Bag kulisserne i zoo	DEN	Bak kulissene i zoo	documentary	IMDb
Dream On	USA	Dagdrømmeren	comedy	IMDb
Drømmerollen	NOR		reality television	
Du skal høre mye...	NOR		entertainment	IMDb
Du skal høre mye mer	NOR		entertainment	IMDb
Duck Dodgers	USA		animation	IMDb
Dynasty	USA	Dynastiet	soap opera	IMDb

== E ==
Original title	Country	Norwegian title	Genre	IMDb
Edel Vare	NOR		documentary	
Egypt	GBR		history drama	IMDb
Ekko av Ibsen	NOR		drama	
Eldrebølgen	NOR		reality television	
En kongelig familie	NOR		documentary	IMDb
En Noman i Pakistan	NOR		documentary	
En udødelig mann	NOR		drama	IMDb
Energikampen	NOR		reality television	
Engaged & Underage	USA		documentary	IMDb
Etaten	NOR		comedy	IMDb
Ett litet rött paket	SWE		drama	IMDb
Etter Skoletid	NOR		entertainment	
Eva og Adam	NOR		documentary	

== F ==
Original title	Country	Norwegian title	Genre	IMDb
Fabrikken	NOR		entertainment	
The Fairytaler	DEN	H.C. Andersens eventyr	animation	IMDb
Falcon Crest	USA	Maktkamp på Falcon Crest	drama	IMDb
Fantastiske fortællinger	DEN	Fantastiske fortellinger	reality television	IMDb
The Famous Jett Jackson	USA CAN	Den berømte Jett Jackson	action comedy	IMDb
Father Ted	GBR		situation comedy	IMDb
Fawlty Towers	GBR	Hotell i særklasse	situation comedy	IMDb
Fedrelandet	NOR		drama	IMDb
Filmplaneten	NOR		film criticism	
Fireman Sam	GBR	Brannmann Sam	animation	IMDb
Fjendens ansigt	DEN		documentary	IMDb
Fjortis	NOR		drama	IMDb
Fleksnes fataliteter	NOR		situation comedy	IMDb
Flickan vid stenbänken	SWE		drama	IMDb
Flo, fjell og fjære: Jostein Flo utforsker Vestlandet	NOR		travel	IMDb
Forandring fryder	NOR		home renovation	IMDb
FBI Forbrukerinspektørene	NOR		consumer	IMDb
Forbrydelsen	DEN	Forbrytelsen	thriller	IMDb
Fortuna	NOR		drama	IMDb
Fotballfeber	DEN FIN; NOR SWE		documentary	
Foyle's War	GBR	Kriminalsjef Foyle	crime	IMDb
Fraggelbergen	NOR		family	IMDb
Fraggle Rock	USA	Fragglene	family	IMDb
Franklin	CAN FRA; USA		animation	
Fremtiden kommer bakfra	NOR		comedy	IMDb
Frokost-TV	NOR		morning show	IMDb
From the Earth to the Moon	USA	Herfra til månen	drama	IMDb
Fulle fem	NOR		current events	
Funky Cops	USA	Funky kopps	animation	IMDb
Først & sist med Fredrik Skavlan	NOR		talk show	IMDb

== G ==
Original title	Country	Norwegian title	Genre	IMDb
Gammel årgang	NOR		documentary	
Gastronomi	NOR		documentary	
George Shrinks	CAN	George Krymp	animation	IMDb
Ghost Trackers	CAN		paranormal documentary	IMDb
Girls in Love	GBR	Guttegærne jenter	drama	IMDb
Gjensynet	NOR		documentary	
God julemorgen!	NOR		family entertainment	
The Gold Rush	DEN FIN; NOR SWE		documentary	IMDb
Good Morning, Miami	USA	God Morgen, Miami	situation comedy	IMDb
Graven	SWE		thriller	IMDb
Greg the Bunny	USA		comedy	IMDb
The Grid	GBR	Fryktens nettverk	thriller	IMDb
Grosvold	NOR		talk show	IMDb
Grønn glede	NOR		nature	
Gråtass	NOR		family	
Gunsersen & Grønlund A/S	NOR		sketch show	IMDb
Gutta boys	NOR		drama	IMDb

== H ==
Original title	Country	Norwegian title	Genre	IMDb
H_{2}O: Just Add Water	AUS	H_{2}O	adventure	IMDb
The Hitchhiker's Guide to the Galaxy	GBR		comedy	IMDb
Halvseint	NOR		animation	
Halvsju	NOR		talk show	IMDb
Hannah Montana	USA		comedy	IMDb
Harry Enfield's Television Programme	GBR		sketch show	IMDb
Heartbeat	GBR	Med hjartet på rette staden	comedy drama	IMDb
Hemmeligheten i B-by	NOR		crime comedy	IMDb
Herfra til evigheten	NOR		documentary	
Herfra til haglemoen	NOR		comedy	IMDb
Heroes	USA		adventure	IMDb
Herreavdelingen	NOR		radio program	VG Norway
Herskapelig	NOR		documentary	IMDb
Hey Arnold!	USA	Hei Arnold	animation	IMDb
Historien om Norge	NOR		documentary	IMDb
Hjemme hos Bye & Rønning	NOR		sketch show	
Hjerte til Hjerte	NOR		comedy	
Hodejegerne	NOR		game show	IMDb
Hornblower	GBR	Hornblowers eventyr	drama	
Hotel Babylon	GBR	Hotell Babylon	comedy drama	IMDb
Hotellet	NOR		documentary	IMDb
House	USA		medical drama	IMDb
Hvad nuh...?	NOR		talk show	IMDb
Hubert	NOR		animation	
Hundehjørnet	NOR		comedy	
Hurtigruten 365	NOR		documentary	
Huset med det rare i	NOR		children	
Husker du?	NOR		music	IMDb
Høyt skattet	NOR		game show	IMDb

== I ==
Original title	Country	Norwegian title	Genre	IMDb
I'm Alan Partridge	GBR	E.g. er Alan Partridge	situation comedy	IMDb
I'm from Rolling Stone	USA		reality television	IMDb
I kveld	NOR		talk show	
Idébanken	NOR		debate	IMDb
Il était une fois... l'homme	FRA	Det var en gang et menneske	animation	IMDb
Il était une fois... la vie	FRA	Det var en gang - livet	animation	IMDb
In a Heartbeat	CAN USA	Hjartepatruljen	drama	IMDb
Inspector Morse	GBR	Inspektør Morse	crime	IMDb
Institusjonen	NOR		documentary	

== J ==
Original title	Country	Norwegian title	Genre	IMDb
Jan Johansen: Jakten på den norske mannen	NOR		documentary	IMDb
Jesus & Josefine	DEN		Christmas calendar	IMDb
Johnny og Johanna	NOR		family drama	IMDb
Jon med skrivemaskinen	NOR		children	IMDb
Jordmødrene	NOR		documentary	
Jubalong	NOR		comedy	IMDb
Jul i blåfjell	NOR		Christmas calendar	IMDb
Jul i Skomakergata	NOR		Christmas calendar	IMDb
Jul i svingen	NOR		Christmas calendar	IMDb
Jul på månetoppen	NOR		Christmas calendar	IMDb
Julemorgen	NOR		children	
Julenøtter	NOR		quiz show	

== K ==
Original title	Country	Norwegian title	Genre	IMDb
Kajsas ko	SWE	Kajsas ku	family	IMDb
Kalle og Molo	NOR		animation	
Kanal 1	NOR		animation	
Kaoskontroll	NOR		home renovation	
Karaoke-TV	NOR		entertainment	
Katjakaj og Bentebent	DEN		animation	IMDb
Kid Paddle	BEL CAN; FRA		animation	IMDb
Kim Possible	USA		animation	IMDb
Kjempesjansen	NOR		entertainment	
Kjære dagbok	NOR		documentary	
Kjære kamera(t)	NOR		drama	
Klikkstart	NOR		documentary	IMDb
KLMs nachspiel	NOR		sketch show	IMDb
KLMs vorspiel	NOR		sketch show	IMDb
Kodenavn Hunter	NOR		thriller	IMDb
Koht i familien	NOR		documentary	
Koht i kommunen	NOR		documentary	
Kompis	NOR		entertainment	
Konger for Norge	NOR		documentary	
Kontorsjef Tangen	NOR		situation comedy	IMDb
Kontrapunkt	DEN FIN; NOR SWE		game show	IMDb
Kos og kaos	NOR		documentary	
Krimvakta	NOR		documentary	
Kripos	NOR		documentary	
Kroppen	NOR		documentary	
Krøniken	DEN FIN; NOR SWE		drama	IMDb
Kulturnytt	NOR		culture	
Kvinnan i det låsta rummet	SWE		drama	IMDb
Kvinner på randen	NOR		sketch show	IMDb
Kvitt eller dobbelt	NOR		game show	IMDb
Kylie Kwong: Heart and Soul	AUS	Kylie Kwongs kjøkken	food	IMDb

== L ==
Original title	Country	Norwegian title	Genre	IMDb
Laila og lille-Laila	NOR		drama	IMDb
Landeplage	NOR		music	
The Larry Sanders Show	USA	Larry Sanders-show	comedy	IMDb
Late Show with David Letterman	USA	David Letterman-show	talk show	IMDb
Law & Order: Criminal Intent	USA	Lov og orden: New York	police procedural	IMDb
Leende guldbruna ögon	SWE		comedy	IMDb
Leirskolen	NOR		documentary	
Lekestue	NOR		drama	IMDb
Lille lørdag	NOR		satire	IMDb
Lillys butikk	NOR		children	
Lilo & Stitch: The Series	USA	Lilo og Stitch	animation	IMDb
Linda Green	GBR		comedy drama	IMDb
Linus i svingen	NOR		children	
Little Britain	GBR		comedy	IMDb
The Little Mermaid	USA	Den lille havfruen	animation	IMDb
Little Red Tractor	GBR	Den lille røde traktoren	animation	IMDb
Livet er Svalbard	NOR		documentary	
Livet på kjøpesenteret	NOR		documentary	
Lizzie McGuire	USA	Lizzies beste år	comedy	
Love My Way	AUS	Elsk meg	drama	IMDb
Lucky Luke	FRA		animation	
Luftens helter	NOR		comedy	IMDb
Lyden av lørdag	NOR		music	
Lydverket	NOR		music	IMDb
Lysglimt i mørke	NOR		documentary	
Lørdagsredaksjonen	NOR		entertainment	IMDb
LørDan	NOR		talk show	IMDb
Løs på snippen	NOR		satire	IMDb
Løvebakken	NOR		satire	IMDb
Lära at simma	NOR SWE		comedy	IMDb

== M ==
Original title	Country	Norwegian title	Genre	IMDb
Mad About Alice	GBR	Gal etter Alice	comedy	IMDb
MADtv	USA		sketch show	IMDb
The Mahabharata	GBR		fantasy	IMDb
Manns minne	NOR		history	IMDb
Marerittet	NOR SWE		thriller	IMDb
Mediemenerne	NOR		debate	
Melodi Grand Prix	NOR		music	IMDb
Melonas	NOR		sketch show	IMDb
Mia	NOR		comedy	IMDb
Miami Vice	USA		crime	IMDb
Midnatt@nrk	NOR		music	IMDb
Migrapolis	NOR		documentary	IMDb
Mitt mekka - en annerledes pilgrimsferd	NOR		travel	IMDb
Monarch of the Glen	GBR	Kar for sin kilt	comedy drama	IMDb
Monty Python's Flying Circus	GBR	Monty Pythons flygende sirkus	sketch show	IMDb
Moomin	FIN	I mummidalen	animation	IMDb
Moville Mysteries	CAN	Moville-mysteriene	animation	IMDb
mPetre-TV	NOR		entertainment	
The Muppet Show	GBR		variety	IMDb
Murder, She Wrote	NOR	Jessica Fletcher	crime	IMDb
Murder in Mind	GBR	Mord i tankene	crime anthology	IMDb
My Family	GBR	Hvilket Liv!	situation comedy	IMDb

== N ==
Original title	Country	Norwegian title	Genre	IMDb
Nr. 13	NOR		situation comedy	IMDb
Nattseilere	NOR		drama	IMDb
Neighbours	AUS	Naboer	soap opera	IMDb
Newton	NOR		science	IMDb
Nikkerne	NOR		talk show	IMDb
Nikolaj og Julie	DEN		comedy drama	IMDb
Night Visions	USA	Mareritt	horror anthology	IMDb
Nils & Ronnys TV-cocktail	NOR		travel	IMDb
Nitimemordet	NOR		crime	IMDb
Nomes ark	NOR		talk show	MDb
Nordkalotten 365	NOR		nature	
Norge rundt	NOR		documentary	IMDb
Norsktoppen	NOR		radio program	
NU er det NU	NOR		family	IMDb
Nynytt	NOR		sketch show	IMDb
Nytt på nytt	NOR		satire	IMDb

== O ==
Original title	Country	Norwegian title	Genre	IMDb
O.J. - en utstrakt hånd	NOR		sketch show	IMDb
O.J. på nye eventyr	NOR		sketch show	IMDb
O.J. ute på prøve	NOR		sketch show	IMDb
The Office	GBR	Kontoret	comedy	IMDb
Offshore	NOR		drama	IMDb
Oppgang B	NOR		comedy	IMDb

== P ==
Original title	Country	Norwegian title	Genre	IMDb
P3tv live	USA		entertainment	
Paradise	USA	Livet i Paradise	western	IMDb
Peak Practice	GBR	Landsbylegane	medical drama	IMDb
Peep Show	GBR		comedy	IMDb
Pelle Parafins Bøleband og automatspøkelsene	NOR		crime comedy	IMDb
Pelle politibil	NOR		children	IMDb
Ping-Pong	NOR		drama	IMDb
Portveien 2	NOR		children	IMDb
The Practice	USA	Advokatene	legal drama	IMDb
Psych	USA		crime comedy	IMDb
Puls	NOR		health	IMDb
På gränsen	NOR SWE		situation comedy	IMDb

== R ==
Original title	Country	Norwegian title	Genre	IMDb
Radio Røynda	NOR		reality television	
Radioskugga	SWE		drama	IMDb
Randi & Ronnys restaurant	NOR		comedy	IMDb
Redaksjon En	NOR		debate	IMDb
Reinlykke	NOR		documentary	
Ribbe Ribbe Fattigmann	NOR		satire	IMDb
Robin Hood	GBR		adventure	IMDb
Ryk eller reis	NOR		game show	IMDb
Rød snø	NOR SWE		crime	IMDb

== S ==
Original title	Country	Norwegian title	Genre	IMDb
S:t Mikael	SWE		medical drama	IMDb
The Sausage Factory	CAN USA	Fyrar og flammer	comedy	IMDb
Scooby-Doo, Where Are You!	USA	Hva nå, Scooby Doo?	animation	IMDb
Schrödingers katt	NOR		science	IMDb
Seier'n er vår	NOR		comedy	IMDb
Serum Serum	NOR		crime comedy	IMDb
Sesame Street	USA	Sesam Stasjon	family	IMDb
The Show	NOR		satire	IMDb
Showbiz	NOR		entertainment	
Showtalk	NOR		sketch show	IMDb
Singelklubben	NOR		comedy	IMDb
Skai TV - imitert fjernsyn	NOR		sketch show	IMDb
Skam	NOR		drama	IMDb
The Sketch Show	GBR	Sketsj-show	sketch show	IMDb
Skipper & Skeeto	DEN	Magnus og Myggen	animation	IMDb
Skjärgårdsdoktorn	NOR SWE		medical drama	IMDb
Sjätta dagen	SWE		thriller	IMDb
Skrotnisse och hans vänner	SWE		family	IMDb
Sofies verden	NOR		drama	IMDb
Sommeråpent	NOR		talk show	IMDb
The Sopranos	USA		drama	IMDb
SpongeBob SquarePants	USA	Svampebob	animation	IMDb
Spooks	GBR		thriller	IMDb
Standpunkt	NOR		debate	IMDb
Star Stories	GBR		comedy	IMDb
The Starter Wife	USA	Singel i L.A.	comedy drama	IMDb
State of Play	GBR	Farlig spill	drama	IMDb
Stingers	AUS	Politiagentene	police procedural	IMDb
Store Studio	NOR		talk show	IMDb
Stå opp!	NOR		children	
Swap TV	CAN	Byttelånerne	infotainment	
Sørgekåpen	NOR		crime	IMDb

== T ==
Original title	Country	Norwegian title	Genre	IMDb
Ta den ring	NOR		science fiction	IMDb
Taxi, Taxi	NOR		comedy	IMDb
Terningen er kastet	NOR		game show	IMDb
Third Watch	USA	Den tredje vakten	drama	IMDb
Tid er penger	NOR		game show	IMDb
Tiden før Tim	NOR		drama	IMDb
To the Manor Born	GBR	Født på solsiden	situation comedy	IMDb
To trøtte typer	NOR		animation	IMDb
Tore på sporet	NOR		talk show	IMDb
Tre brødre som ikke er brødre	NOR		sketch show	IMDb
Tre kast	DEN NOR; SWE		game show	IMDb
Trotto libre	NOR		sketch show	IMDb
TVtv	NOR		satire	IMDb
Twigs	NOR		drama	IMDb
Typisk norsk	NOR		documentary	IMDb

== U ==
Original title	Country	Norwegian title	Genre	IMDb
U	NOR		talk show	IMDb
Uhu	NOR		children	
Urix	NOR		television news magazine	
Ut i naturen	NOR		Nature	

== V ==
Original title	Country	Norwegian title	Genre	IMDb
Ved kongens bord	NOR		drama	IMDb
Veier vår tid	NOR		documentary	IMDb
Verden i dag	NOR		current affairs	
Vertshuset den gyldne hale	NOR		Christmas calendar	IMDb
VG-lista topp 20	NOR		music	IMDb
Vikingane	NOR		historical comedy	IMDb
Våre beste år	NOR		Comedy	IMDb

== W ==
Original title	Country	Norwegian title	Genre	IMDb
Waking the Dead	GBR	Kalde spor	police procedural	IMDb
Walkabout	NOR		travel	IMDb
Walking with Cavemen	GBR	Huleboerne kommer	documentary	IMDb
The West Wing	USA	Presidenten	drama	IMDb
The Whitest Kids U' Know	USA	Whitest Kids-TV	sketch show	IMDb
Whoopi	USA		situation comedy	IMDb
The Wild Thornberrys	USA	Den ville familien Thornberry	animation	IMDb
The Wire	USA		drama	IMDb
Without a Trace	USA	Sporløst forsvunnet	police procedural	IMDb
The Worst Week of My Life	GBR	Den verste uka i mitt liv	comedy	IMDb
The Worst Witch	CAN GBR	Den dårligste heksa i klassen	fantasy comedy	IMDb

== X ==
Original title	Country	Norwegian title	Genre	IMDb
XLTV	NOR		satire	IMDb

== Y ==
Original title	Country	Norwegian title	Genre	IMDb
Young Dracula	GBR	Dracula Junior	family comedy	IMDb
Yum Yum med Noman	NOR		food	

== Ø ==
Original title	Country	Norwegian title	Genre	IMDb
Ørnen: En krimi-odysssé	DEN		police procedural	IMDb
Øystein og meg	NOR		sketch show	IMDb

== Å ==
Original title	Country	Norwegian title	Genre	IMDb
Åpen Himmel	NOR		religion	
Åpen post	NOR		debate	IMDb
Åpen post	NOR		talk show	IMDb
