= List of programs broadcast by TVNorge =

This is a list of programs broadcast by TVNorge.

== 0-9 ==
Original title	Country	Norwegian title	Genre	IMDb
10 Years Younger	GBR	10 dager - 10 år yngre	Makeover	IMDb
18 Wheels of Justice	USA	Hevn på 18 hjul	Action	
19:30	NOR		Debate	
2ge+her	USA		Comedy	IMDb
3 fluer	NOR		Game show	IMDb
3rd Rock from the Sun	USA		Sitcom	IMDb
4-stjerners middag	NOR		Food	
48 Hours	USA		News/documentary	

== A ==
Original title	Country	Norwegian title	Genre	IMDb
Airline	GBR		Documentary	IMDb
Aliens in America	USA		Sitcom	IMDb
Alt for Norge	NOR		Reality	
American Gothic	USA		Horror	IMDb
American Princess	USA		Reality TV	IMDb
America's Funniest Home Videos	USA		Home videos	IMDb
Amish in the City	USA		Reality TV	IMDb
The Apprentice	USA		Reality TV	IMDb
The Associates	CAN	Firmaet	Legal drama	
Average Joe	USA		Reality TV	IMDb
Average Joe: Hawaii	USA		Reality TV	IMDb
Average Joe: The Joe Strikes Back	USA		Reality TV	IMDb

== B ==
Original title	Country	Norwegian title	Genre	IMDb
Babylon 5	USA		Science fiction	IMDb
The Bachelor	USA	Ungkaren	Reality TV	IMDb
The Bachelorette	USA	Ungkarskvinnen	Reality TV	IMDb
Banzai	GBR		Comedy	IMDb
Bare Brita Show	NOR		Talkshow	IMDb
Bare når jeg ler	NOR		Sitcom	
Baretta	USA		Police drama	IMDb
Beadle's About	GBR		Hidden camera	IMDb
Bergerac	GBR		Crime	
Berserk mot Sydpolen	NOR		Documentary	
The Beverly Hillbillies	USA		Sitcom	IMDb
Beyond Tomorrow	AUS		Documentary	IMDb
Big Brother (Norwegian version)	NOR		Reality TV	IMDb
Big Brother 100 dager etter	NOR		Documentary	IMDb
Big Brother Direkte	NOR		Reality TV talkshow	
The Biggest Loser	USA		Reality TV	IMDb
The Bill Engvall Show	USA	Bill & Co.	Sitcom	
Birkebeinerne	NOR		Reality TV	
Blackadder	GBR	Den sorte orm	Comedy	
Blade: The Series	USA		Action	IMDb
Blanke ark	NOR		Reality TV	
Blow Out	USA	Hårfin i LA	Documentary	
Body of Proof	NOR		Crime drama	
The Bold and the Beautiful	USA	Glamour	Soap opera	IMDb
Bondi Vet	AUS	Dyrlegen på Bondi Beach	Documentary	
Border Patrol	NZL	Grensevakten New Zealand	Documentary	
Border Security: Australia's Front Line	AUS	Grensevakten	Documentary/reality TV	IMDb
Bosom Buddies	USA		Sitcom	IMDb
Boston Public	USA		Drama	IMDb
Boy Meets World	USA	Et Gutteliv	Sitcom	IMDb
The Brady Bunch	USA		Sitcom	IMDb
Brat Camp	GBR		Reality TV	IMDb
Bridezillas	USA	Brudegalskap i N.Y.	Documentary	
Brutte løfter	NOR		Debate	
Buffy the Vampire Slayer	USA	Buffy	Supernatural	IMDb

== C ==
Original title	Country	Norwegian title	Genre	IMDb
Caesars Palace	USA		Documentary	
Castle	USA		Police procedural	
Change of Heart	USA	Kjærlighetstesten	Dating show	
Chicago Hope	USA		Medical drama	IMDb
Chip 'n Dale Rescue Rangers	USA		Animation	
City Homicide	AUS		Police procedural	IMDb
The Closer	USA		Crime drama	IMDb
Clueless	USA		Comedy	IMDb
Coast to Coast USA: Biker-Jens	DEN		Travel	IMDb
Cold Case	USA		Police procedural	IMDb
Colosseum	NOR		Contest	
Comeback	NOR			
Commander in Chief	USA		Drama	IMDb
Complete Savages	USA	Aldri fred å få	Sitcom	IMDb
Cougar Town	USA		Comedy	
Coupling	GBR		Sitcom	IMDb
Cowboy Builders	GBR	Byggebransjens cowboyer	Reality TV	
Cracker	GBR	Fitz	Crime	
Crime Traveller	GBR		Science fiction crime	
Criminal Minds: Suspect Behavior	USA		Police procedural	
The Crocodile Hunter	USA	Krokodillejegeren	Documentary	
The Cruise	GBR		Documentary	
Cruiseliv	NOR		Documentary	
CSI: Crime Scene Investigation	USA		Police procedural	IMDb
CSI: Miami	USA		Police procedural	IMDb
CSI: NY	USA		Police procedural	IMDb
Cybill	USA		Sitcom	IMDb
Cyou	NOR		Dating show	IMDb

== D ==
Original title	Country	Norwegian title	Genre	IMDb
Da Ali G Show	GBR; USA		Satire	IMDb
Dansefeber	NOR		Reality TV	
Dark Angel	USA		Science fiction	IMDb
Date My Mom	USA		Dating show	IMDb
Debbie Travis' Facelift	CAN	Nytt Rom	Home renovation	IMDb
Degrassi: The Next Generation	CAN		Drama	IMDb
Dharma & Greg	USA		Sitcom	IMDb
Diagnosis: Murder	USA	Diagnose Mord	Crime	IMDb
DiResta	USA		Sitcom	IMDb
Dirty Sexy Money	USA		Drama	
The Doctors	USA	Legene	Health	
Dog the Bounty Hunter	USA		Documentary	
Dog Whisperer	USA	Hundehviskeren	Reality TV	
Driving Mom and Dad Crazy	GBR	Monsternbarna	Reality TV	

== E ==
Original title	Country	Norwegian title	Genre	IMDb
Ed	USA		Comedy-drama	
Ekstrem Forvandling (Norwegian version of Extreme Makeover)	NOR		Reality TV	
elimiDATE	USA		Dating show	IMDb
Emmerdale	GBR		Soap opera	
En reise i sjelen	NOR		Documentary	
Eve	USA		Sitcom	IMDb
Everest 2005	NOR		Documentary	
Et døgn med Elin	NOR		Interview	IMDb
Et lite stykke Thailand	NOR		Documentary	
European Poker Tour			Sport	
eXamen	NOR		Game show	IMDb
Extreme Makeover	USA	Ekstrem Forvandling	Reality TV	IMDb

== F ==
Original title	Country	Norwegian title	Genre	IMDb
Family Affair	USA	Hendene fulle	Sitcom	
Family Matters	USA	Steve	Sitcom	IMDb
Family Ties	USA	Fem i familien	Sitcom	IMDb
Far Out	NOR		Game show	
Fastlane	USA		Action	IMDb
Fat Actress	USA		Comedy	
Father Dowling Mysteries	USA	Sogneprestens mysterier	Crime drama	
Father Knows Best	USA		Sitcom	IMDb
The FBI Files	USA		Documentary	IMDb
Fengselskoret	NOR		Reality TV	
Filmquiz	NOR		Interactive game show	
Fired Up	USA	I Fyr og Flamme	Sitcom	IMDb
For åpen scene	NOR		Sitcom	
Fornemmelse for mord	NOR		Crime documentary	
Fra sjel til sjel	NOR		Supernatural documentary	
Frasier	USA		Sitcom	IMDb
Freaks and Geeks	USA		Drama	IMDb
Friday Night Lights	USA		Drama	IMDb
The Fresh Prince of Bel-Air	USA		Sitcom	IMDb
From Flab to Fab	GBR	Superstjernekropp	Makeover	
...from Hell	UK		Documentary	

== G ==
Original title	Country	Norwegian title	Genre	IMDb
Gary Unmarried	USA	Lykkelig skilt	Sitcom	
Ghost Whisperer	USA		Paranormal	IMDb
Gilmore Girls	USA		Drama	IMDb
Girlfriends	USA		Sitcom	
Gjennom nøkkelhullet	NOR		Interview	IMDb
Global Cops	USA		Documentary	
Gomer Pyle, U.S.M.C.	USA	Gomer Pyle	Sitcom	
Gossip Girl	USA		Drama	IMDb
The Graham Norton Show	GBR		Talkshow	IMDb
Greatest American Dog	USA		Reality TV	
Greek	USA	Collegeliv	Comedy-drama	
Gretne gamle gubber	NOR		Reality TV	
Grounded for Life	USA		Sitcom	IMDb
Gøy på landet	NOR		Dating show	

== H ==
Original title	Country	Norwegian title	Genre	IMDb
Handel og vandel	NOR		Sitcom	
Hangin' with Mr. Cooper	USA	Cooper og gjengen	Sitcom	IMDb
Happy Endings	USA		Comedy	
Hawaii Five-O	USA		Police procedural	IMDb
HC's Musikkquiz	NOR		Interactive game show	
Heia Tufte!	NOR		Reality TV	IMDb
Helt Perfekt	CAN; NOR		Comedy	
Helt privat	NOR			
High School Reunion	USA		Reality TV	IMDb
Higher Ground	CAN; USA	Mot alle odds	Drama	
Hit og dit	NOR		Travel	
Hitmakers	NOR SWE DEN		Reality TV	
Hogan's Heroes	USA		Sitcom	IMDb
Hombres	NOR SWE		Drama	IMDb
Home Rules	USA	Familiehjelpen	Reality TV	
How Clean Is Your House?	NOR	Ekstrem Rengjøring	Home renovation	
Howie Do It	USA	Grundig lurt	Hidden camera	
Hr. og fru Thoresen	NOR		Interview	IMDb
Hunter	USA		Crime drama	
Hvem kan slå Ylvis?	NOR		Competition	
Hvordan bli norsk	NOR		Documentary	IMDb

== I ==
Original title	Country	Norwegian title	Genre	IMDb
I kveld med Thomas Giertsen	NOR		Talkshow	IMDb
I kveld med YLVIS	NOR		Talkshow	
I Love Lucy	USA		Sitcom	IMDb
I søkelyset	NOR			
In the House	USA	På Hjemmebane	Sitcom	IMDb
In Living Color	USA	I Levende Live	Sketch show	IMDb
In Search of Perfection	GBR	Kokkekjemi	Food	
Inside Dish with Rachael Ray	USA		Food	IMDb
Instant Star	CAN		Comedy	IMDb
Internatet	NOR		Reality TV	IMDb
Invasion	USA		Science fiction	IMDb

== J ==
Original title	Country	Norwegian title	Genre	IMDb
Jack & Bobby	USA		Drama	IMDb
Jake and the Fatman	USA		Crime	IMDb
Jakten på den 6. sans	NOR		Reality TV	
Jamie at Home	GBR	Hjemme hos Jamie	Food	
Jamie Live	GBR		Food	
Jenny	USA		Sitcom	IMDb
Jeopardy! (Norwegian version)	NOR		Game show	
Jesse	USA		Sitcom	IMDb
The Job	USA		Comedy	IMDb
Joe Millionaire	USA		Reality TV	IMDb
Jorda rundt	NOR		Travel	
Judas	NOR			IMDb
Jul i Tøyengata	NOR		Comedy	IMDb
Juritzen direkte	NOR		Talkshow	IMDb
The Jury	USA		Legal drama	IMDb
Justice	USA		Legal drama	

== K ==
Original title	Country	Norwegian title	Genre	IMDb
Kamp i klaveret	NOR		Music	
Kandidaten (Norwegian version of The Apprentice)	NOR		Reality TV	IMDb
Keeping Up Appearances	GBR	Høy på pæra	Sitcom	
Kjære Birgitte	NOR			
Klart svar	NOR			
Kojak	USA		Crime	IMDb
Kongen Befaler (Norwegian version of Taskmaster)	NOR		Comedy/Game show	IMDb
Kongsvik Ungdomsskole	NOR		Comedy	
Krimkommisjonen	NOR		Documentary	
Krypto	NOR		Interactive game show	
Kystpatruljen	NOR		Documentary	

== L ==
Original title	Country	Norwegian title	Genre	IMDb
Laguna Beach: The Real Orange County	USA	MTV's Laguna Beach	Reality TV	
Laverne & Shirley	USA		Sitcom	IMDb
Law & Order: Special Victims Unit	USA	Special Victims Unit	Police procedural	IMDb
Law & Order: Trial by Jury	USA	Dømt av juryen	Legal drama	
Life Goes On	USA	Livet går videre	Drama	IMDb
Lingo	NOR		Game Show	
The Listener	CAN		Crime drama	
Living Single	NOR	Fri og frank	Sitcom	IMDb
LJK	NOR			
Lois & Clark: The New Adventures of Superman	USA	Lois & Clark	Action	IMDb
Lost	USA		Mystery	IMDb
The Love Boat: The Next Wave	USA		Comedy	IMDb
LYST: Bolig	NOR		Home renovation	
LYST: Mat	NOR		Food	
LYST: Velvære	NOR		Makeover	

== M ==
Original title	Country	Norwegian title	Genre	IMDb
Maggie	USA		Sitcom	
Magnum, P.I.	USA		Crime	IMDb
Major Crimes	USA		Crime	
Make my day	NOR		Reality TV	
Mandagsklubben	NOR		Satire	IMDb
Matlock	USA		Legal drama	IMDb
McLeod's Daughters	AUS		Drama	IMDb
Meego	USA		Sitcom	IMDb
Mess-TV	NOR		Interactive television	IMDb
The Michael Richards Show	USA		Sitcom	IMDb
The Millionaire Matchmaker	USA	Millionær søker kjæreste	Reality TV	
Millionæren (Scandinavian version of Joe Millionaire)	NOR SWE DEN		Reality TV	IMDb
Mission: Impossible	USA		Action	IMDb
Model Behaviour	GBR	Modellakten	Documentary	
Moesha	USA		Sitcom	IMDb
Monster Garage	USA	Monstergarasjen	Documentary	IMDb
Mr. & Mrs. Smith	USA		Comedy drama	IMDb
Mr. Bean	GBR		Comedy	IMDb
MTV Cribs	USA		Documentary	
Muldvarpen	NOR		Reality TV	IMDb
My Life as an Animal	GBR	Mitt liv som gris	Reality TV	
My Three Sons	USA		Sitcom	IMDb
My Wife and Kids	USA	Liv og Røre	Sitcom	IMDb

== N ==
Original title	Country	Norwegian title	Genre	IMDb
Naked Science	USA	Nådeløse naturkrefter	Documentary	
The New Adventures of Old Christine	USA	Christine	Sitcom	
Newlyweds: Nick and Jessica	USA	Din for alltid	Documentary	
Next Action Star	USA		Reality TV	
The Next Joe Millionaire	USA		Reality TV	IMDb
Nissene på Låven	NOR		Comedy	IMDb
No Ordinary Family	USA		Drama	
The Norm Show	USA	Norm	Sitcom	IMDb
Notes from the Underbelly	USA	Bolle i ovnen	Comedy	
Nådeløs kveldskos med Tom Mathisen og Herodes Falsk	NOR		Sketch show	

== O ==
Original title	Country	Norwegian title	Genre	IMDb
The Odd Couple	USA		Sitcom	IMDb
Once Upon a Time	USA		Drama	
One Tree Hill	USA		Drama	IMDb
The Osbournes	USA		Documentary	IMDb
Oslo Lufthavn	NOR		Documentary	
The Adventures of Ozzie and Harriet	USA	Ozzie & Harriet	Sitcom	IMDb

== P ==
Original title	Country	Norwegian title	Genre	IMDb
The Parent 'Hood	USA	Fri oppdragelse	Sitcom	
Parker Lewis Can't Lose	USA		Comedy	IMDb
The Path to 9/11	USA	Terrorens dag	Drama	
Peking Express Scandinavia	NOR SWE DEN		Reality TV	IMDb
Pepsi live	NOR		Music	
Perfect Strangers	USA	Larry og Balki	Sitcom	IMDb
Pictionary (version of Pictionary)	NOR		Game show	
The Planet’s Funniest Animals	USA		Home videos	IMDb
Plastic Fantastic			Documentary	
Playing It Straight	USA		Reality TV	IMDb
Politiet	NOR		Documentary	
The Pretender	USA		Thriller	
Profiler	USA		Crime	IMDb
Providence	USA		Drama	IMDb
På klozz hold	NOR		Game show	

== R ==
Original title	Country	Norwegian title	Genre	IMDb
Rachael Ray	USA		Talkshow	IMDb
Radio Active	CAN		Sitcom	
Real Housewives of New York	USA		Reality TV	
Reisesjekken	NOR		Dating show	IMDb
Remington Steele	USA		Crime	IMDb
Renegade	USA		Action	IMDb
Rescue 911	USA		Documentary	IMDb
Revelations	USA		Drama	IMDb
Rich Girls	USA	Rike jenter leker best	Documentary	
Rita Rocks	USA		Sitcom	
Rizzoli & Isles	USA		Crime	
Roast fra Chat Noir	NOR		Celebrity roast	
Rome	USA		Drama	IMDb
Rookie Blue	CAN		Drama	
Roseanne	USA		Sitcom	
Russejentene	NOR		Docu-soap	

== S ==
Original title	Country	Norwegian title	Country	IMDb
Salsa	USA		Erotic	IMDb
Santa Barbara	USA		Soap opera	IMDb
Satisfaction	AUS		Drama	
Savannah	USA		Drama	
Secret Diary of a Call Girl	GBR		Drama	
$#*! My Dad Says	USA		Sitcom	
Sigurds Verden	NOR		Travel	
Silikonfri sone	NOR		Talkshow	
Silje og Sigurd - et slags reiseprogram	NOR		Travel	
Sinnasnekker'n	NOR		Home renovation	
Sirens	USA		Police procedural	IMDb
Sister, Sister	USA		Sitcom	IMDb
Sisters	USA	Søstre	Drama	
Sjarmørskolen	NOR		Reality TV	IMDb
Skjult kamera	NOR		Hidden camera	
Skolmenholmen	NOR		Talkshow	
Slankekrigen	NOR		Reality TV	
Slå på tråden	NOR		Interactive television	
Smallville	USA		Adventure	IMDb
Smil til det skjulte kamera	NOR		Hidden camera	
Snabbgrabbar med Raske Menn	NOR		Sketch show	
So Little Time	USA		Sitcom	IMDb
So You Think You Can Dance	USA		Reality TV	IMDb
So You Think You Can Dance Scandinavia	NOR SWE DEN		Reality TV	
Sonny with a Chance	USA	Sonnys sjanse	Sitcom	
Sons & Daughters	USA		Comedy	IMDb
Sparks	USA		Sitcom	
Spin City	USA		Sitcom	IMDb
Spinn	NOR		Game show	
Spotlight	NOR		Entertainment news	
Starveillance	USA		Animation	IMDb
Step by Step	USA	Steg for Steg	Sitcom	IMDb
Stump røyken	USA		Reality TV	
Super Quick	NOR		Game show	
Supernatural	USA		Paranormal	IMDb
Surface	USA		Science fiction	IMDb
Sushi	NOR		Hidden camera	IMDb
Söndagsparty med Filip & Fredrik	SWE		Talkshow	

== T ==
Original title	Country	Norwegian title	Genre	IMDb
Ta kvelden med Benny Borg	NOR		Talkshow	
Takk for sist	NOR			
Tangerudbakken Borettslag	NOR		Documentary	
Taxi	USA		Sitcom	IMDb
Temptation Island	USA		Reality TV	IMDb
Temptation Island Australia	AUS		Reality TV	
Temptation Island Scandinavia	NOR SWE DEN		Reality TV	
Timon & Pumbaa	USA		Animation	
Tine	NOR		Talkshow	
Tiny Toon Adventures	USA		Animation	IMDb
To Catch a Predator	USA	Jakten på en overgriper	Investigative journalism	
Tommy Lee Goes to College	USA		Documentary	IMDb
Toonsylvania	USA		Animation	IMDb
Touched by an Angel	USA	En Engel iblant Oss	Drama	IMDb
Tour of Duty	USA		Drama	IMDb
Tre kronor	SWE		Soap opera	IMDb
Tre på Toppen	USA		Sitcom	IMDb
Tur : retur	NOR		Travel	
Turnuslegene	NOR		Documentary	
TV to Go	GBR		Sketch show	IMDb
Twins	USA		Sitcom	IMDb
Two of a Kind	USA		Sitcom	IMDb
The Tyra Banks Show	USA		Talkshow	

== U ==
Original title	Country	Norwegian title	Genre	IMDb
Ugly Betty	USA		Comedy	
Ullared	SWE		Documentary	
Undercover Boss (UK)	GBR		Reality TV	
Undercover Boss (US)	USA		Reality TV	
Undercover Boss Australia	AUS		Reality TV	
Ungdomsnett	NOR		Youth show	
Ungkaren (Norwegian version of The Bachelor)	NOR		Reality TV	IMDb
Ungkarsnissen	NOR		Comedy	
USA High	USA		Sitcom	IMDb
Ushi	NOR		Hidden camera	IMDb

== V ==
Original title	Country	Norwegian title	Genre	IMDb
Valen & de etter fjøstid	NOR		Sketch show	IMDb
Valen TV	NOR		Sketch show	IMDb
Vengeance Unlimited	USA	Mr. Chapel - Hevneren	Action	
Venner og Fiender	NOR		Soap opera	IMDb
Veronica Mars	USA		Drama	IMDb
Villa Medusa	NOR		Reality TV	IMDb

== W ==
Original title	Country	Norwegian title	Genre	IMDb
Walt Disney World Resort	USA	Fantastiske Disney World	Documentary	
The War at Home	USA		Sitcom	IMDb
Wesenstund	NOR		Talkshow	
What I Like About You	USA		Sitcom	IMDb
Who Wants to Marry My Dad?	USA	Ungkarspappaen	Reality TV	
The Wild Wild West	USA		Western	IMDb
Wildfire	USA		Drama	
Will & Grace	USA		Sitcom	IMDb
Wings	USA		Sitcom	IMDb
Wipeout	USA		Competition	
Wipeout (Norwegian version)	NOR		Competition	
Without a Trace	USA	Sporløst forsvunnet	Police procedural	
Wizards of Waverly Place	USA		Sitcom	
The Wonder Years	USA	Våre beste år	Drama	IMDb
World Poker Tour	USA		Sport	IMDb
The World's Strictest Parents	GBR	Verdens strengeste foreldre	Reality TV	

== Y ==
Original title	Country	Norwegian title	Genre	IMDb
Ylvis møter Veggen	NOR		Contest	
Young, Dumb and Living Off Mum	GBR	Ung, dum og bortskjemt	Reality TV	

== Z ==
Original title	Country	Norwegian title	Genre	IMDb
Zoey 101	USA		Comedy	IMDb
Zoo School	USA		Documentary	

== Å ==
Original title	Country	Norwegian title	Genre	IMDb
Åndenes Makt	NOR		Paranormal	
