= Husker Du (disambiguation) =

Hüsker Dü is an American punk rock band.

Husker Du may also refer to:

- Hūsker Dū?, North American edition of a Danish board game
- Husker du? (TV program), a Norwegian television program
