= Heia Norge =

Heia Norge may refer to:

- Heia Norge (VG), a moniker in the newspaper Verdens Gang
- Heia Norge (TV program), a 1988–1998 Norwegian television program that aired on Norwegian Broadcasting Corporation
