= TVNorge HD =

Logo from 2024

TVNorge HD is a High Definition television channel in Norway. The channel is a joint venture by TVNorge and cable and satellite-TV distributor Canal Digital which started broadcasting on October 3, 2008. It's the first Norwegian high definition channel, but currently only some of its contents is available in HD (HBO shows like Rome and other American series like Terminator: The Sarah Connor Chronicles). The HD station has the same schedule as the SD station. Broadcasts not available in high definition are broadcast in standard definition.

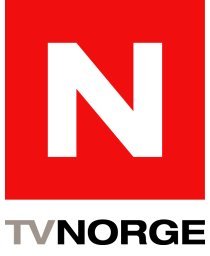
Logo from 2003 to 2024

== Current content in high definition ==
- Mrs. Nota
- The Big Bang Theory
- CSI: Crime Scene Investigation
- CSI: NY
- CSI: Miami
- The War At Home
- Terminator: The Sarah Connor Chronicles
- The Closer
- Rome
- Lost
- Hugo and Ident

== Norwegian content ==
- Titi Ελένη Φουρέιρα
- I kveld med YLVIS
- 71° nord

== See also ==
- List of Norwegian television channels
- List of programs broadcast by TVNorge
