= John Andreassen =

Norwegian television producer (1943–2026)

- Born: 26 August 1943; Oslo, German-occupied Norway
- Died: 25 March 2026 (aged 82); Gjøvik Municipality, Norway
- Awards: Gullruten (2008); King's Medal of Merit in Silver (2013)

John Andreassen (26 August 1943 – 25 March 2026) was a Norwegian television producer who was behind a number of TV productions for the Norwegian Broadcasting Corporation. He was in 2000 the country's only teacher of Multi-Camera Production and taught at Lillehammer University College. He was with the Norwegian Broadcasting Corporation from 1964.

Andreassen produced television programmes including Den store klassefesten, LørDan and Lørdagsredaksjonen.

As well as television productions, he also produced the opening ceremonies for the 1994 Winter Olympics, the FIS Nordic World Ski Championships 1997 in Trondheim, the opening of Gardermoen in 1998, Eurovision Song Contest in 1986 and the Millennium Show at Rådhusplassen in Oslo.

Andreassen died on 25 March 2026, at the age of 82.

== Awards ==
In 2008, Andreassen was awarded Gullruten's Course Prize. The European Broadcasting Union described him in 1989 as one of Europe's foremost TV producers.

On 10 August 2013, Andreassen was awarded the King's Medal of Merit for his significance to the development of Norwegian television and TV-entertainment. The Director-General of the Norwegian Broadcasting, Thor Gjermund Eriksen, handed Andreassen the award during a live broadcast of the show Sommeråpent.

Preceded by (Sweden) Steen Priwin	Eurovision Song Contest Director; 1986	Succeeded by (Belgium) Jacques Bourton
