= Zahid Ali =

Norwegian stand-up comedian (born 1976)

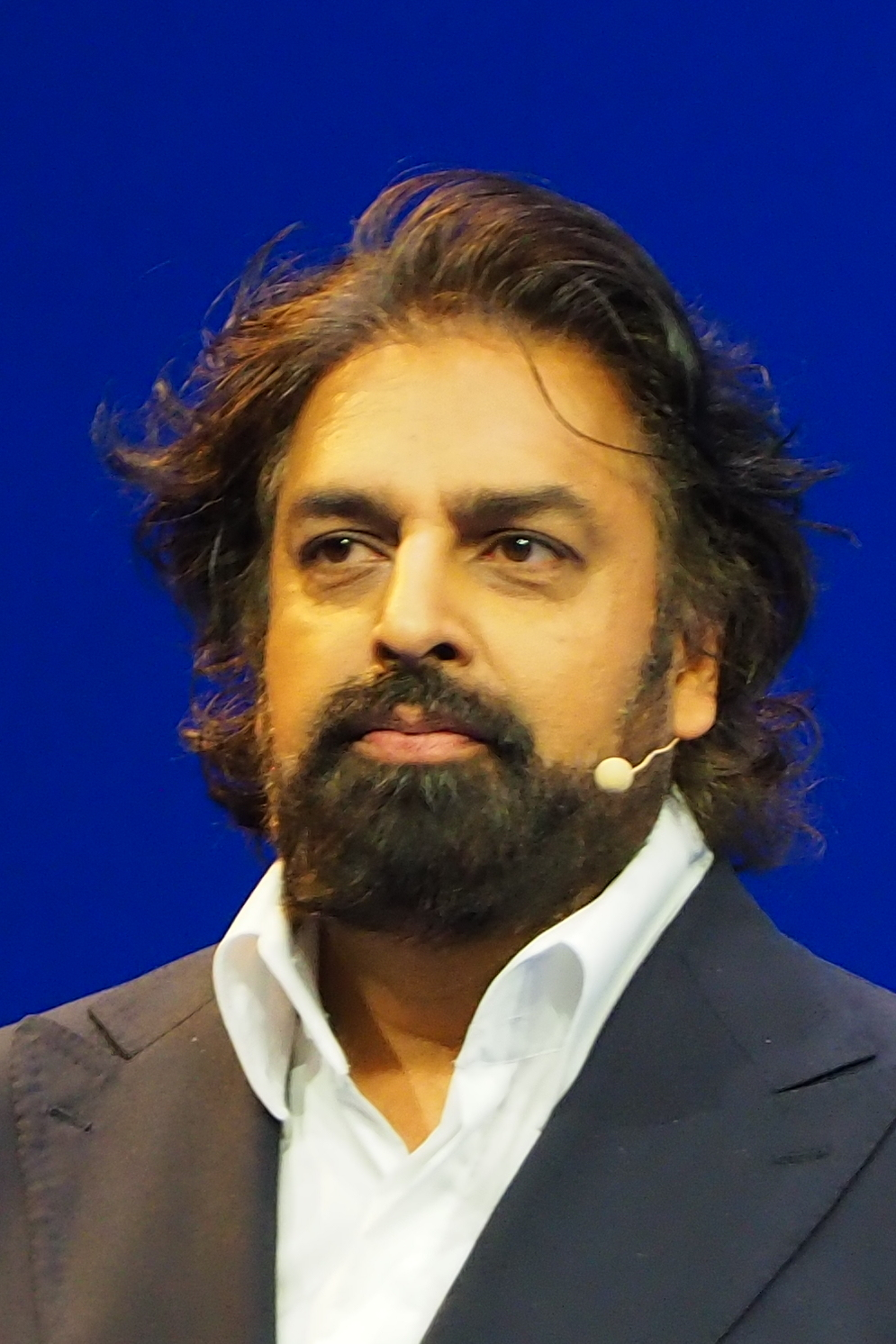
- Ali in 2025
- Born: 30 June 1976 (age 50); Oslo, Norway
- Education: Ringerike Folk High School

Comedy career
- Years active: 1999–present
- Medium: Stand-up; television; film; books
- Genres: Political/news satire; observational comedy; surreal humour; insult comedy; deadpan

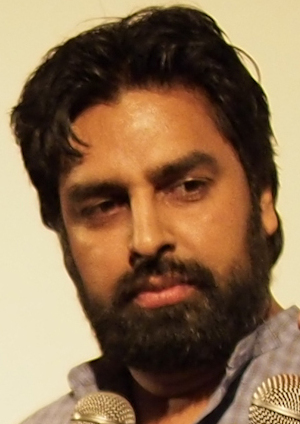
Ali in 2013

Zahid Ali (Urdu: زاہد علی; born 30 June 1976) is a Norwegian stand-up comedian. Debuting in 1999, Ali has ventured into presenting, acting, and writing for various prominent film, TV, and stage projects. He is known for his participation in the TV2 show Rikets Røst, which is hosted by Otto Jespersen. After the publicity this show resulted in, he has become a popular comedian and actor.

== Early life and education ==
Ali, born in Oslo to Pakistani parents, grew up in Torshov and Nordstrand. He studied at Ringerike Folk High School until 1998.

== Career ==
In 2006 Ali, gathered almost all of the most popular comedians in Norway to raise money for relief work in Pakistan after the earthquake disaster that year. All the money raised was donated to the Embassy of Pakistan and was used to build a new school in Kashmir.

In December 2006, Ali appeared in the series Jul i Tøyengata on Norwegian channel TVNorge, playing the lead role as shoemaker Ali. The series was an Advent calendar-type series, aired daily up until 24 December. It was a spoof of an original children's Christmas series in Norway, Jul i Skomakergata.

In 2010 Ali received the Brobyggerprisen, a Norwegian prize for building relations between immigrants and Norwegian natives. His work is also about fighting prejudice. Zahid Ali has also toured with his stand-up show Zahid Ali-live and often appears in corporate videos.

He acted in the 2005 film Izzat and the television series Hellfjord.

In 2023, Ali published the crime comedy novel Wiper, a Spotless Detective; its co-authors are Rune Alexandersen and Elene Martinsen.

== See also ==
- Norwegians of Pakistani descent
