= Liv Marit Wedvik =

Norwegian country rock singer (1970–2015)

Liv Marit Wedvik (16 January 1970 – 23 May 2015) was a Norwegian country rock singer. She was born in Skien, and began singing as an adult. When she started her solo career, the records came in rapid succession: Then He Kissed Me (January 2003), Hitchin’ A Ride (June 2003), Country Jul (christmas album with Heidi Hauge and Jenny Jenssen, late 2003) and Whatever You Say (January 2004). Her first four albums sold about 200,000 combined, mostly in rural locations as she suffered from below-average reviews in the press.

After a falling out with her label until then, Showtime Records, she signed with EMI and issued her next albums on EMI subsidiary Odeon Records: Home Sweet Home (2005) and Riding out the Storm (2006) followed by Solid Ground (2010).

Wedvik resided in Skien and had two children. She worked as a dentist's assistant outside of music. In 2006 she was also the presenter of the TV3 reality Ville vesten, and in 2007 she was a cast member of Skal vi danse?. She died in May 2015 near Risør from drowning.
