= Pia Haraldsen =

Norwegian television personality

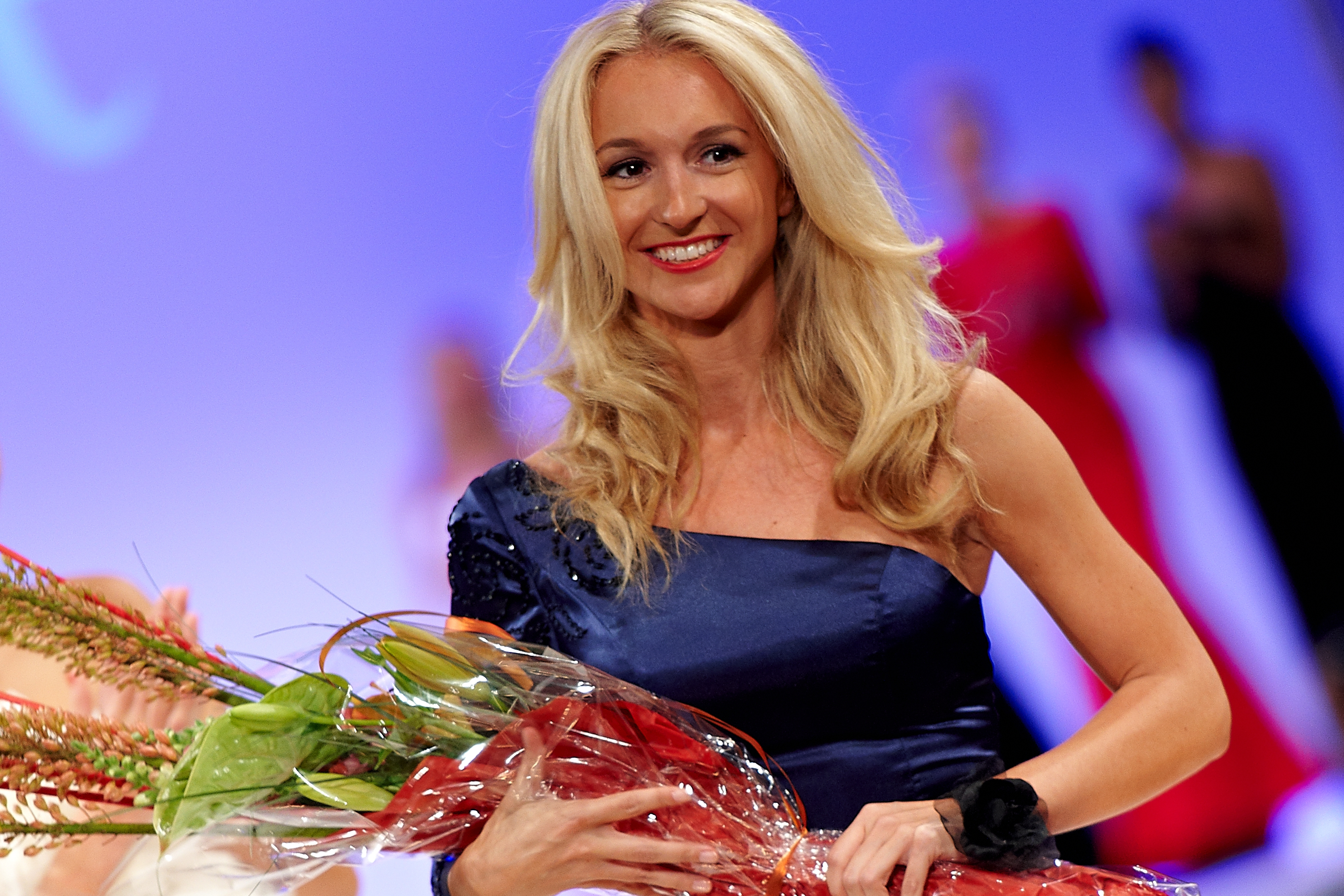
- Pia Haraldsen in 2010
- Born: Pia Renate Strømsnes; 1 August 1981 (age 45); Akershus, Norway
- Occupations: Model, TV personality, comedian, author

Pia Renate Haraldsen (born Pia Renate Strømsnes 1 August 1981) is a Norwegian TV personality, comedian, and author, most known for her interviews on the Norwegian TV show Rikets Røst.

She is the daughter of Jasmin Haraldsen, who was married to Queen Sonja's nephew, Karl Otto Haraldsen.

== Career ==
She started her public career in 2001 by going to Crown Prince Haakon's (now Haakon VIII) wedding, which she was invited to because of her relation to the queen. In the wedding, she met Guillaume, Hereditary Grand Duke of Luxembourg, and they began dating in 2002. They became a high-profile couple, but the relationship ended after a year and a half. In 2004 she received a lot of attention for her dress at the baptism of Princess Ingrid Alexandra of Norway. In the following years she has had numerous appearances in Norwegian media.

Her first occupation was as a columnist for Norway’s biggest newspaper, VG. (2004), then she moved on to the Norwegian edition of the magazine Cosmopolitan as a Fashion & Entertainment Editor (2004/2005). In February 2005 she got a job as a jury member in the TV show Shopaholic at TV 3. Later that year she became the TV host of the shows Kjendisjakten (2005) and then Frokostquiz (2006) on TV 2, Norway's biggest commercial channel.

In February 2007 she started as Political Editor on one of TV 2's most popular shows, Rikets Røst (translated as "The Nations Voice") hosted by comedian Otto Jespersen where she punked and provoked political interview subjects with dupe questions and her fake ignorance. She also covered the presidential election for the show from Norway in November 2008.

September 2007 she participated in Norway's Dancing with the Stars (Skal vi danse ) on TV2.

November 2007 she published her first book; Pias bekjennelser, shopping, sjekking, skikk og bruk.

Spring 2009 it was announced that Pia and her mother, Jasmin Haraldsen, would search for love in their own dating reality show "Pia og Jasmin" on Norwegian TV3. The show was shot in South of France summer of 2009 and broadcast on TV the following fall. Pia chose partner Vemund Aarstrand in the show finale, while mother Jasmin found love in contestant Jan Horn, whom she married February 2010. Pia and Vemund broke up spring 2010, as documented in the Norwegian press.

In 2010, Pia designed her first womenswear collection for Norwegian fashion house Agape. The collection was named Pia Haraldsen for Agape and launched at Oslo Fashion Week in August 2010.

In 2011, Pia made her TV comeback as host of a Travel Show on TV8, called "LuksusFri". The same year Pia also hosted a fashion makeover show and was named the face of Passion Watches.

== Interview with James Oddo ==
In the summer of 2007, Haraldsen filmed an interview with New York City politician James Oddo. She asked how Barack Obama could run for president, as he is not a U.S. citizen (she said she read somewhere he was "African-American") and asked if Senator Clinton could be president after the "cigar incident?". The councilman reacted to the questions and threw the crew out of his office.

After the interview was shown on Norwegian Television it was posted on YouTube and attracted attention. Haraldsen was interviewed by large American media outlets like USA Today, Inside Edition and Fox News.

In early October 2008, Haraldsen was denied a visa by US authorities. This came after the US Embassy in Oslo had sought a second opinion from the Department of Homeland Security. The refusal states that she does not appear to fulfill requirements for journalists; however, it states she may apply for an artist visa. Haraldsen wanted to cover the presidential election for TV 2 Entertainment. A tourist visa application takes about two weeks to process, whereas a journalist visa only takes 3 days.
