= Ivar Ruste =

Norwegian singer (1916–1985)

Ivar Ruste (23 September 1916 – 25 February 1985) was a Norwegian singer.

He was born in 1916 in Kristiania. He made his stage debut at age 17, but had to work odd jobs to support his singing. His career took off in the 1940s and 1950s, with Mor, kjære mor selling 28,000 copies. He also participated in the television show Husker du, and became known for his touring of retirement homes together with Odd Grythe and Arnt Haugen. Beginning in 1971, a total of 130 programs of the Husker du series were produced, and it became the longest entertainment series at the Norwegian Broadcasting Corporation until then. Ruste was house vocalist at the series, which also resulted in seven best-selling music albums between 1972 and 1979, starting with the album Husker du dengang? Ruste died in 1985 at Aker Hospital.
