= Leif Erik Forberg =

Norwegian television presenter

Leif Erik Forberg (born September 29, 1950) is a Norwegian television presenter with a long career in both TV and radio. Forberg has served as a presenter for NRK, TVNorge, TV3, P4, and Kanal24. In the 1990s he was known as the presenter for the program Casino on TVNorge and Komplottet on TV3.

Forberg was born in Harstad. He was active in Harstad's amateur theater in 1976, when he started working for NRK Troms. He became a permanent employee in 1978, and some time later he was associated with P2, where he helped create the news program Her og nå. He worked with P2 from its first test broadcast in 1980 onward. Forberg also served as a television presenter for NRK, including for the children's program Flimra. In 1993 he moved to TVNorge to take over as presenter for the program Casino, and in 1996 he moved to TV3, where he served as presenter for the entertainment program Komplottet. He started working as a presenter at P4 in 1999, and then moved to Kanal24 in 2005.

Forberg received Prix Radio's annual honorary award in 2012 for his long career in Norwegian radio, where he worked on all of the national channels from the start of NRK P2, from morning host on P4 to his current presenter's job at Radio Norge.

== Other ==
In 1974 he had a bit part in the Norwegian war film Under en steinhimmel (Under a Stone Sky).

== TV programs ==
- Melodi Grand Prix (NRK, 1990)
- Eurovision Song Contest (NRK, commentator, 1993)
- Casino (TVNorge, 187 programs, 1993–1996)
- Komplottet (TV3, 1996–1998)
- Mayday Mayday (TV3, 1998)
