= Autofil =

Norwegian car magazine

Autofil ('Autophile') is a Norwegian car magazine that was launched in fall 2002. It is Norway's largest independent car magazine, with 11 regular issues a year plus four special issues. The magazine is based on an NRK TV program of the same name. The headquarters is in Oslo. Autofil was previously published by Se og Hør press, which has been part of Aller Media since 2013.

Knut Skogstad was the magazine's first editor, before Espen Stensrud took over as chief editor in 2008. In 2014, the magazine had a print run of 24,791 copies and a readership of 130,000. The magazine's target audience is men 20 to 40 years old.

Autofil launched a new website, autofil.no, at the end of March 2012. The website offers car entertainment, its own web TV channel, a new car guide, and more than a hundred used car tests.

The Autofil editorial team consists of Espen Stensrud (chief editor), Knut Arne Marcussen (journalist), Lord Arnstein Landsem (journalist), Stein Inge Stølen (multimedia journalist), and Jamieson Pothecary (art director).

The TV program with the same name was aired on NRK1 from January 2, 2001, to summer 2008 and was hosted by Jan Erik Larssen.

== Print run ==
According to the Norwegian Media Businesses' Association, Autofil has had the following annual print run:

- 2011: 27,219
- 2012: 23,323
- 2013: 24,261
- 2014: 24,791
- 2015: 23,371
- 2016: 21,922
