= Brød og sirkus =

- Country of origin: Norway

Original release
- Network: NRK2
- Release: November 2, 2002 – May 10, 2006

Brød og sirkus was a Norwegian debate programme which was broadcast by NRK2 from autumn 2002 until spring 2006. The presenter was Knut Olsen.

The first programme was broadcast on 2 November 2002 and the last was broadcast on 10 May 2006.

The series was broadcast live from Studentersamfundet i Trondhjem in a so-called "town hall meeting style". Various themes around current affairs and politics were discussed each episode with live debates taking place.
