= Arkivet =

- Genre: Situation comedy
- Starring: Helga Meisingset
- Country of origin: Norway
- Original language: Norwegian
- No. of seasons: 1

Production
- Running time: 30 minutes (Including commercials)

Original release
- Network: TV3
- Release: 2006 – 2006

Arkivet (Eng: "The Archive") is a Norwegian ten-episode comedy drama series set in a hospital archive. The series was compared with The Office by some critics due to the "mockumentary" style but was actually developed (but not screened) before the British hit show.

The first episode was watched by 74,000 viewers, but the rest of the series had an average of only 44,000 viewers.
