= Husker du? (TV program) =

Norwegian TV program (1971–1985)

Husker du? (Norwegian for "Do you remember?") is a television music program aimed at senior citizens, broadcast between the years 1971 and 1985 by the Norwegian Broadcasting Corporation. It was initiated and largely hosted by Ivar Ruste, accompanied by Odd Grythe initially and Børt-Erik Thoresen after Grythe's health deteriorated. When Ruste retired due to ill health, Thoreson merged the show with a classical-music program he had hosted, continuing until mid-1985. Ruste's death earlier that year influenced Thoreson's decision to conclude the program; at that point 130 programs in the series had been broadcast, with several recordings from the show being published for EMI.

== History ==
On 7 October 1971, a new TV show "aimed at people who had lived a while", hosted by Odd Grythe and Ivar Ruste, Husker du?, was announced. It first premiered on national television on 13 October, starting at 21:15 during the night. It was shot from Engebret Café in Oslo with direction from Bjørn Scheele. Arnt Haugen was responsible for the music, leading an orchestra of seven. It contained interviews with and performances by musicians who were invited to play on the show. The second and third episodes followed on 10 November and 8 December. These were the only planned programmes for the show, but by December, Grythe had informed that it would likely continue over the New Year. Ruste had gotten the idea of TV shows for the elderely after he performed at a nursing home with Grythe and Haugen: "The television really should have been here now!". He had sent the suggestion for a new show to NRK the day after, but it wasn't picked up until a year and a half later, when Grythe's position at the company had changed.

In April 1980, Grythe announced that the 101st episode would be the final one, but stated that a comeback was a possibility. The 100th episode was broadcast on 17 May, Norway's Constitution Day, and the 101st aired on 10 June. In response to the show's conclusion, the production company received thousands of protest letters, many of which were from pensioners' associations. The immense response made them reassess whether to shut it down or replace it with something similar. Despite claims that it was shut down because of company management, Grythe stated that it was entirely his decision to stop.

The show returned to NRK on 1 September 1982 with the 102nd episode.

Ivar Ruste died on 25 February 1985. Ruste was not commemorated on any of the following programmes. When question about this, Grythe stated that "they do not tend to it on such programmes". The woman who called him to ask was also informed that there would only be two more episodes left of the show before Grythe would retire. On 31 May, it was announced that the final programme of the show would air in June, with Grythe retiring in December. The 130th and final programme aired on 30 June 1985.
