= Elisas univers =

- Genre: Dating game show
- Presented by: Elisa Røtterud
- Country of origin: Norway
- Original language: Norwegian
- No. of seasons: 1

Production
- Editor: Gusty Utterdahl
- Running time: 60 minutes (Including commercials)

Original release
- Network: TV3
- Release: January 17, 2000

Elisas univers was a dating show that aired on TV3 hosted by Elisa Røtterud, a former contestant on the Norwegian Survivor.

The show premiered on 17 January 2000.
