= Hellfjord =

Norwegian television series

Hellfjord is a Norwegian comedy television series. It consists of seven 30 minute episodes and premiered on NRK1 9 October 2012. The series was produced by Tommy Wirkola of Tappeluft Pictures for NRK.

== Premise ==
Salmander is a police officer from Oslo who, after mistakenly killing his police horse in front of a large group of children, is banished to the Northern Norwegian village of Hellfjord. In beautiful but mysterious Hellfjord he is welcomed by the vulgar and eccentric sheriff, and meets the dim-witted journalist Johanne who suspects that something lies beneath the surface in the village. Salmander has to contend with murders and the local sea monster.

== Cast ==
- Zahid Ali – Salmander
- Stig Frode Henriksen – Kobba
- Ingrid Bolsø Berdal – Johanne
- Thomas Hanzon – Bosse Nova
- Pihla Viitala – Riina
- Lars Arentz-Hansen – Brobaker

== Production ==
The series is written and produced by Tommy Wirkola, Zahid Ali and Stig Frode Henriksen and was recorded in Gryllefjord on the island of Senja, and Film Camp in Øverbygd summer 2011. The series was sold abroad even before it was recorded. The recording received EU support through the MEDIA Programme with a grant of 2,100,000 kr.

== International broadcast ==
- Australia – The series premiered on SBS One from 18 November 2013.
- Latin America – The series is available for free on Crackle since July 2015.
- Poland – The series premiered on TTV from 28 May 2016.
- United Kingdom – The series premiered on Channel 4 on 7 July 2017.
