= Klasse 10 B =

Norwegian docu-series on NRK1

Klasse 10 B is a Norwegian documentary series produced by Strix Television, which was first shown on NRK1 in spring 2010. The series is based on the Swedish concept, Klass 9a (sv:Klass 9A). Filming began in spring 2009, and the premiere of episode 1 of 10 had 536,000 viewers.

The idea of the series was to put some of Norway's best teachers in a poor-performing school class, and try to make them one of the best classes in the country. During the spring semester, class 10b of Sten-Tærud skole in Skedsmo municipality were taken by nine hand-picked teachers.

== Teachers ==
Course	Teacher	School
Norwegian	Harald Ødegaard	Engebråten skole
Maths	Ingvill Merete Stedøy-Johansen	Lillestrøm videregående skole
English	Liv Torunn Strandmyr	Nadderud videregående skole
Biology	Gry Anita Ryskar Bjelland	Gjerdrum ungdomsskole
Religion, morals, and ethics	Maria Spydevold	Kråkerøy ungdomsskole
Comparative studies	Thomas M. Johanson	Hundsund ungdomsskole
P.E.	Live Marie Toft	Sandvika videregående skole
Art and design	Anne Hauge	Hellerasten skole
Music	Matias Hilmar Iversen	Bøler skole

== Prizes ==
The series won the spring 2010 Gullruten in the category of best new program series. The series was also nominated in the category of best reality show.
