= Verden i dag =

Norwegian current affairs radio program

Verden i dag ("The World Today") was a current affairs radio programme focusing on global news, produced by the Norwegian Broadcasting Corporation (NRK). It was broadcast every morning from Monday to Friday on NRK P2 for several years, until being discontinued in 2008. It was presented by the journalist in charge of international news on NRK radio. It included reports from the NRK foreign correspondents, from the international affairs reporters at the NRK headquarters, and sometimes guests were invited to the studio.
