= All About Animals =

All About Animals is an Australian television series. It is a show about all types of animals including Australian native animals, exotic animals and pets. The show is hosted by 9-year-old Olivia Todd and her 15-year-old brother, Jake. Together they travel to a range of animal sanctuaries, zoos and wildlife parks to learn interesting things about different animals. They also interview a range of celebrities who love animals or are representatives of different wildlife organisations.

The key messages Olivia and Jake aim to communicate are about responsible pet ownership as well as animal welfare and conservation. The show is filmed in different parts of Australia.

The show is currently broadcast across Australia and New Zealand.

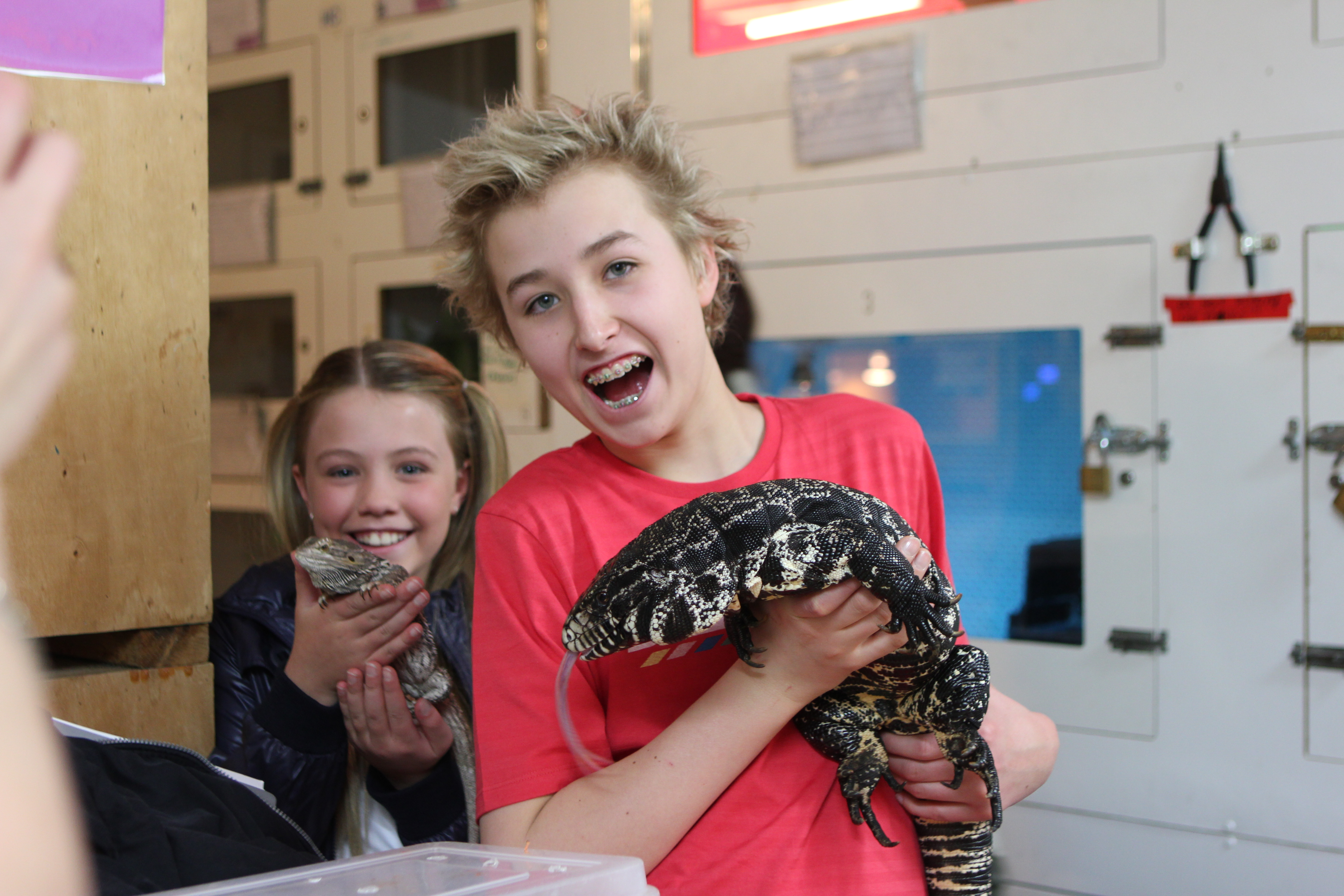
Olivia and Jake learn about reptiles at Australian Reptile Park.

== Networks ==
- Southern Cross Television
- C31 Melbourne
- Television Sydney
- 44 Adelaide
- 31 Brisbane
- West TV
- Triangle Stratos

== Crew ==
- Presenters: Olivia and Jake Todd
- Executive producer: Monika Todd
- Camera: Roger Dowling
- Location sound: Les Francis
- Camera assistant: Cameron Averay
- Hair, makeup, wardrobe: Kirsty Michael & Stacey McClure
- Editor: Tim Ash
- Equipment hire: Picture Hire Australia
