= Shopaholic (TV series) =

Norwegian television series

Shopaholic is a Norwegian television series first broadcast on TV3 in 2004. Pia Haraldsen and Hilde Marstrander judged consumer products on this shopping program.

== Winner ==
- Julia B. Lyon
- Oslo

=== Finalists ===
- Renate Virving
- Elin Beatrice Thomassen
- Janis Maria Wilson
- Julia B Lyon
- Gyda Katrine Bloch Thorsen
- Christine Bråthen
- Linda Ramstad Dypvig
- Suzie Kraman
- Colleen Christiansen
