= Designerspirene =

Norwegian reality television series

- Starring: Vendela Kirsebom
- Country of origin: Norway
- No. of episodes: 11

Production
- Running time: 60 min (including commercial)

Original release
- Network: TV3
- Release: 26 February 2007 – May 2007

Designerspirene was a Norwegian reality television series that focused on fashion design. The show is aired on TV3 and is based on the American format, Project Runway hosted by Heidi Klum. Project Runway has been Emmy-nominated for "Outstanding reality-competition program" in 2005 and 2006. The show has only had one season in 2007 with no plans for a renewal.

Spirene follows similarly to the American format. Each week contestants are given a task and money to create the best outfit under a restricted amount of time. The outfit is shown off at the runway and judged at the end of the show. The judges then deliberate who will be sent home for elimination.

Designerspirene is hosted by supermodel Vendela Kirsebom Thommessen. The regular judges are Vendela Kirsebom Thommessen, fashion designer Peter Løchstøer, and Petra Middelthon fashion director of Norwegian ELLE magazine, with the fourth judge as a new guest judge. Tim Gunn's mentor role in the American format is done by William Jensen, Norway's first fashion designer.

The season one awards included a collection showing at Oslo Fashion Week, a trip to Olympus Fashion Week in New York, a fashion spread in ELLE magazine, sewing equipment worth $6,500 from Janome, and $25,000 in cash.

The title derives from designer which is a borrowed cognate in Norwegian from English and spirene which literally means sprout or bud but here takes on the figurative meaning of a designer budding or growing into a better one.

The show lasted only one season before being canceled.

== Season 1 ==
Elimination Chart
| DESIGNER | 1 | 2 | 3 | 4 | 5 | 6 | 7 | 8 | 9 | 10 | 11 | 12 | MODEL | MODELSWAP |
|---|---|---|---|---|---|---|---|---|---|---|---|---|---|---|
| Daniel | WIN | HIGH | HIGH | HIGH | WIN | HIGH | HIGH | HIGH | WIN | HIGH | IN | WINNER | SILJE | ANJA WIN |
| Tina | IN | HIGH | IN | HIGH | IN | WIN | HIGH | LOW | LOW | LOW | IN | RUNNER-UP | SINA | SINA |
| Iselin | HIGH | WIN | IN | IN | OUT | LOW | IN | HIGH | LOW | WIN | IN | OUT | HANNE | HANNE |
| Chamoun | IN | HIGH | IN | IN | HIGH | HIGH | WIN | WIN | HIGH | OUT | | | KAJA | SILJE |
| Satan | IN | LOW | IN | IN | HIGH | LOW | LOW | IN | OUT | | | | EVA | EVA |
| Marianne | IN | HIGH | LOW | LOW | IN | LOW | LOW | OUT | | | | | JULIE | KAJA |
| Kjersti | HIGH | HIGH | HIGH | LOW | LOW | HIGH | OUT | | | | | | EUGENIA | EUGENIA |
| Isa | LOW | LOW | WIN | IN | LOW | OUT | | | | | | | ANJA | VICTORIA |
| Kristen | IN | LOW | LOW | WIN | IN | WD | | | | | | | MARTHE | MARTHE |
| Pal Andre | IN | LOW | IN | OUT | | | | | | | | | VICTORIA | |
| Johanna | IN | LOW | OUT | | | | | | | | | | MARIANNE | |
| Ivelina | LOW | OUT | | | | | | | | | | | CHARLOTTE | |
| Kari | OUT | | | | | | | | | | | | JULIE | |

Green background and WIN means the designer/model won that challenge.
Red background and OUT means the designer lost and was out of the competition.
The designer won the challenge.
The designer came in second but did not win the challenge.
The designer had one of the highest scores for that challenge, but did not win.
The designer had one of the lowest scores for that challenge, but was not eliminated.
The designer was in the bottom two, but was not eliminated.
The designer withdrew from the competition.

Episode Guide
| Episode | Guest Judge | Challenge | Comments |
|---|---|---|---|
| 1 | | Use what you're wearing | The contestants have to make a new outfit out of what they are wearing for the party. |
| 2 | Bruuns Bazaar | Inspiration | |
| 3 | Von Dutch | Snowboard outfit for Von Dutch | The winner's outfit will be in selected international stores in 2008 |
| 4 | Signy Fardal | Mothers and friends | |
| 5 | Ida Gullhav | Lingerie | |
| 6 | Doggie Doo | Doggie outfit | The winner's outfit will be on sale at the Doggie Doo store |
| 7 | Postal-Service | Postal Uniforms | |
| 8 | Annette Elvhaug | Make-Over Challenge | |
| 9 | Cecilie Melli | Bridal Gowns | |
| 10 | Ingrid Bolsø Bærdal | Red-carpet dress | |
| 11 | | At home with the finalists | |
| 12 | | Finale | |

=== Contestants ===
- Daniel Sørensen, 30
- Isa Eren, 30
- Kristin Wiola Ødegård, 36
- Kjersti Vatle Toresen, 27
- Marianne Haaning Groos, 23
- Stian Tjernsmo, 25
- Tina Haagensen, 39
- Chamoun Topal, 22
- Iselin Engan, 28
- Pål André Numme, 34
- Johanna Angell-Petersen, 27
- Ivelina Dagsvold, 31
- Kari Ulland, 28

=== Fashion Models ===
- Silje
- Anja
- Marthe
- Eugenia
- Margrete
- Eva
- Sina
- Kaja
- Victoria
- Marianne
- Charlotte
- Julie
