= Televimsen =

Norwegian television series

Televimsen was a former Norwegian television series which was shown from 1963 to 1968. The series was created by film producer Ivo Caprino and author Arild Feldborg. Televimsen's premise was that Frank Robert had returned.

One of the most discussed programmes was that of 1 July 1964, when the Soviet First Secretary Nikita Khrushchev was visiting Norway. The head of the NRK, Hans Jacob Ustvedt, ensured that Televimsen was censored.
