= Huset med det rare i =

Huset med det rare i was a children's television series which ran on NRK1 from 1992 to 2004. From 1992 to 1993, the presenters were Minken Fosheim, Øyvin Berven and Marianne Furevold. After this, Fosheim and Berven were replaced by Ingunn Kyrkjebø and Johannes Joner.

A spinoff presented by Marianne Furevold was launched, called Loftet med det rare i and a further series, Kjelleren med det rare i had no connection to the original series. These two series were based around a few short films introduced by the presenter.

Huset med det rare i was set in an old upper-class house in Madserud allé between Skøyen and Frogner in Oslo. This was also the setting for the Christmas show Amalies jul from 1995.
