= Gay Army =

2006 Danish reality television series

- Genre: Reality
- Developed by: David Sidebotham; Karsten Bartholin
- Starring: Tony Rosenbum
- Country of origin: Denmark
- Original language: English

Production
- Executive producers: David Sidebotham; Karsten Bartholin
- Production company: Babyfoot

Original release
- Network: Kanal 5
- Release: April 27, 2006

Gay Army is a Danish comedy reality television series. It centers around nine effeminate gay men put into the hands of a drill sergeant who puts them through military training exercises. The series was first broadcast in Sweden, Norway and Denmark. The series has also been sold to Italy, Germany, Canada, Switzerland and Poland, although protests led to the show being cancelled in Poland before it aired.

The series was filmed in Tønder, Denmark, and featured contestants from Sweden, Norway, and Denmark.

== Synopsis ==
In each episode the gay recruits face new training missions featuring stereotypically masculine tasks to prepare them for a mock military operation. Contestants are treated to nights of partying and other rewards if the missions are accomplished.

== Reception ==
LGBT rights activists protested the show's stereotypical premise. A Swedish organization called the 'Homo-, Bi-, and Transsexuals in the Armed Forces' (informally associated with the Swedish Armed Forces) met with the production director to ask the network not to air it. Despite this, the show has been very popular with audiences, and has been nominated for awards at the Rose d'Or as well as the 2006 Danish TV Awards.
