= Ville vesten =

- Genre: Reality TV
- Presented by: Liv Marit Wedvik
- Country of origin: Norway
- Original language: Norwegian
- No. of seasons: 1

Original release
- Network: TV3
- Release: 2006

Ville vesten was a Norwegian Reality TV series hosted by Liv Marit Wedvik that aired on TV3.

== Plot ==
Twelve Norwegian contestants drive a herd of cattle through Arizona's desert. The show tests cowboy knowledge and eliminates contestants along the drive. The winner receives a sum of money for cattle at a cattle auction in Willcox, Arizona.

== Ratings ==
The series was broadcast on Sunday evenings in prime time, but was moved after it flopped. The first episode was watched by 95,000 viewers, the second episode was watched by 61,000 viewers.
