= Undercover Boss Norge =

- Genre: Reality television
- Created by: Stephen Lambert
- Country of origin: Norway
- Original language: Norwegian
- No. of series: 1
- No. of episodes: 10

Production
- Running time: 60 minutes

Original release
- Network: TV2
- Release: 8 March – 10 May 2011

Related
- Undercover Boss (franchise)

Undercover Boss is a 2011 Norwegian reality television series, based on the British series of the same name. Each episode depicts a person who has a high management position at a major business, deciding to become undercover as an entry-level employee to discover the faults in the company. The first series premiered on 8 March 2011 with the CEO of the grocery store chain Rimi.

== Format ==
Each episode features a high-ranking executive or the owner of a corporation going undercover as an entry-level employee in their own company. The executives alter their appearance and assume an alias and fictional back-story. The fictitious explanation given for the accompanying camera crew is that the executives are being filmed as part of a documentary about entry-level workers in a particular industry. They spend approximately one week undercover, working in various areas of their company operations, with a different job and in most cases a different location each day. They are exposed to a series of predicaments with amusing results, and invariably spend time getting to know the people who work in the company, learning about their professional and personal challenges.

At the end of their week undercover, the executives return to their true identity and request the employees they worked with individually to corporate headquarters. The bosses reveal their identity, and reward hard-working employees through campaign, promotion, or financial rewards, while other employees are given training or better working conditions.

== Episodes ==
The first series featured 10 episodes. The series premiered on 8 March 2011 and concluded on 10 May 2011.

Series	Episodes	Originally aired	
Series	Episodes	Series premiere	Series finale
1	10	8 March 2011	10 May 2011

=== Series 1 (2011) ===
No.	Title	"Boss"	Original release date
1	"Rimi"	Thor Linge	8 March 2011
2	"Norwegian Air Shuttle"	Hans Petter Aanby	15 March 2011
3	"Sarpsborg"	Rådmann Unni Skaar	22 March 2011
4	"Hansa Borg Bryggerier"	Espen Strømme	29 March 2011
5	"Coop Norden"	Ola Henrik Strand	5 April 2011
6	"Statoil"	Dag Roger Rinde	12 April 2011
7	"Fjord1"	Leif Johan Øverland	19 April 2011
8	"Star Tour"	Ingvild Elise Larner	26 April 2011
9	"IKM Group"	Kåre Hansen	3 May 2011
10	"Reitan Group"	Johannes Sangnes	10 May 2011
