= Bokprogrammet =

Literature-focused Norwegian TV series

- Genre: Culture/literature
- Presented by: Hans Olav Brenner
- Country of origin: Norway
- Original language: Norwegian
- No. of seasons: 16
- No. of episodes: 153

Production
- Running time: 30 minutes

Original release
- Network: NRK1
- Release: 10 January 2006 – 24 March 2014

Bokprogrammet ("The Book Programme") was a Norwegian TV series on literature, which was aired on NRK1 from 2006 to 2014. Each episodes either focused on the works of a famous author, or discussed a specific theme or genre. Hans Olav Brenner hosted the show for the first four and a half years, and was succeeded by Siss Vik from September 2010 onwards.
