= Kråkeslottet =

- Genre: Reality TV
- Presented by: Halvard Haldorsen
- Country of origin: Norway
- Original language: Norwegian
- No. of seasons: 1

Production
- Running time: 60 minutes (Including commercials)

Original release
- Network: TV3
- Release: 2002

Kråkeslottet was a Norwegian reality TV series that aired on TV3 during the spring of 2002, hosted by Halvard Haldorsen.

The concept of the series followed a group of contestants who were living in an old, abandoned hotel as they attempted to refurbish it. Each week, one contestant was voted off the show.

== Ratings ==
The show was a flop for TV3, with the lowest rating reaching 30 000 viewers. The final episode was watched by only 64 000 viewers.

== Aftermath ==
The eventual winner, Andre Iversen, was sued by several of the other contestants because he had agreed to share the prize money with Espen Asbjørnsen, something that was against the rules.
