= Piker, vin og sang =

- Genre: Sitcom
- Starring: Herodes Falsk; Tom Mathisen; Anette Grønneberg; Anders Tangen; Siv Hulleberg
- Country of origin: Norway
- Original language: Norwegian
- No. of seasons: 1
- No. of episodes: 12

Production
- Running time: 30 minutes (Including commercials)

Original release
- Network: TV3
- Release: 2 October – 18 December 1998

Piker, vin og sang is a Norwegian sitcom starring Herodes Falsk and Tom Mathisen. It is a spoof of the adult entertainment industry.

The show premiered in 1998 and had reruns in 1999.

== Plot ==
Urban Tassing publishes men's magazines, while his sister Susanne is more serious. She is married to Stig Benny Tyllingseter, a priest in Frogner. Kurt Uglesett is a photographer and Urban's friend. The receptionist is the Russian Marika. The plot centers on the publishing house Hibischus and their two heirs.

== Cast ==
Actor	Role
Herodes Falsk	Urban Tassing
Tom Mathisen	Kurt Uglesett
Anette Grønneberg	Susanne
Anders Tangen	Stig Benny Tyllingseter
Siv Hulleberg	Marika
