= Valen TV =

Norwegian comedy TV show

Valen TV is a Norwegian TV show created by Kristian Valen which was shown on TVNorge in 2003. The show consists of seven episodes, each lasting for about 25 minutes. The show is mainly parodies of Norwegian and international TV-shows and music videos. Kristian Valen plays all parts in the show himself, whether parodies of famous people in real world or original characters like Helge, Geir and Kjartan

== Original Characters ==
HELGE: A 28-year-old man from Stavanger representing Kristian Valen himself) who dreams about being a star, but instead ends up as a hello-man in Valen TV. He tends to fall asleep at work, always dreaming about himself playing vocalist in famous music videos, but wakes up when the producer, Ronny, yells at him: "Helge! Nå må du våkna; du e på loftå!" meaning "Helge! You have to awake now; you're on air!" In the first episode Ronny promotes Helge to Talkshow host in the program "Ikveld med Helge" (Tonight with Helge) which invites Norwegian celebrities. He always ends up offending his guests, and has to play their roles himself on stage.

GEIR: Geir is a 48–year–old karaoke waiter from Sandnes. He claims to have left TV after applying for Big Brother and Farmen three years in a row. He has difficulty making himself understood because of his heavy stammering. He is known by his big glasses and tight shirts. His catchphrase is "Eg ska toppa heile driden," which means "I'm gonna top the whole shit." Through the show he tries out several occupations, such as weatherman.

KJARTAN: Kjartan makes his first appearance in "Boksaunaen" with Per Inge Torkelsen and afterwards is the host of both Autofil and Dartguides as well as making appearances in the weather.

== Programs ==
Rorbua, Tore Andre Flos fotballskole, Nyhetene (Kveldsnytt, Sportsekstra), Ikveld med Helge, Fornemmelse for hvor, JazzHjørnet, Boksaunaen,

== Music videos ==
Guns N' Roses - Don't Cry U2 - Elevation

== SONGS ==
Bjørn Eidsvåg - Ein Solskinnsdag, A-ha - Stay on These Roads Zucchero and Paul Young - Sense Una Donna

== Persons Imitated ==
Morten Harket, Tore Andre Flo, Odd Karsten Tveit, Åge Hareide, Bjørn Eidsvåg, Bono, Per Inge Torkelsen,
