= Camp Molloy =

- Genre: Reality TV
- Presented by: Ole Andre Sivertsen
- Country of origin: Norway
- Original language: Norwegian
- No. of seasons: 1
- No. of episodes: 60

Production
- Running time: 60 minutes (Including commercials)

Original release
- Network: TV3
- Release: 3 March – 12 June 2003

Camp Molloy was a Norwegian Reality TV series that aired on TV3 during the spring of 2003 and was hosted by Ole Andre Sivertsen.

== About the show ==
The series premiered on 3 March 2003 and aired from Monday to Thursday. There was 60 episodes and 17 contestants. Two winners would get 250,000 kr each. The show was set in the Australian wilderness.

== Ratings ==
TV3 had high hopes for this show, but the show flopped with an average rating of only 69,000 viewers.
