= Lørdagsredaksjonen =

- Genre: Entertainment
- Created by: Erik Bye
- Developed by: Erik Bye
- Directed by: John Andreassen
- Presented by: Stein Roger Bull
- Country of origin: Norway

Production
- Production company: Norwegian Broadcasting Corporation

Original release
- Release: 1980 – 1982

Lørdagsredaksjonen (English: Saturday Editorial) was a Norwegian entertainment programme that was broadcast by the Norwegian Broadcasting Corporation from 1980 to 1982.

The programme was started and hosted by Erik Bye, while Stein Roger Bull and John Andreassen were project manager and director, respectively. The programme was aired on Saturday evening, and consisted of dialogues, music, reportages, and more. Rolf Just Nilsen was responsible for the music.

Many celebrities were invited to the programme, among them actress Britt Langlie and the Nobel Peace Prize laureate Linus Pauling. The programme did face various criticisms. Some of the critics argued that a television programme with a such high degree of political content ought not to be aired on a Saturday evening. The programme was also subject of debate in the Norwegian Parliament.
