= Harem (TV series) =

Norwegian reality television series

- Genre: Reality TV
- Presented by: Mia Gundersen
- Country of origin: Norway
- Original language: Norwegian
- No. of seasons: 1

Production
- Production location: Maldives
- Running time: 60 minutes (Including commercials)

Original release
- Network: TV3

Harem was a Norwegian reality TV series that aired on TV3, hosted by Mia Gundersen. The production company was Strix Televisjon AS. Four women got to choose between 18 men. The men who didn't get chosen, had to go home. The series was shot in the Maldives. The series premiered on 4 October 2001 and had only one season. There was also a Danish version and a Swedish version.

== Contestants ==
=== Female ===
- Karianne Jensen
- Marit Knevelsrud
- Elise Oftedal
- Cathrine Småvik

== Ratings ==
The first episode of Harem was watched by 317 000 viewers, the second episode the viewership dropped to 123 000 viewers. The whole series had an average of between 163 000 and 125 000 viewers. The final episode was watched by 198 000 viewers
