= Komplottet =

- Genre: Hidden camera show
- Presented by: Leif Erik Forberg (1996 - 1998); Åsleik Engmark (2003)
- Country of origin: Norway
- Original language: Norwegian
- No. of seasons: 5

Production
- Running time: 60 minutes (including commercials)

Original release
- Network: TV3
- Release: 1996 – 2003

Komplottet ('The Ploy') was a Norwegian television show that aired on TV3 from 1996 to 1998 and in a revived version in 2003. The host from 1996 to 1999 was Leif Erik Forberg, and the host in 2003 was Åsleik Engmark.

Komplottet was a hidden camera show where the celebrities are the victims. The show is considered TV3's most successful Norwegian production.
