= Juritzen direkte =

- Also known as: arve juritzen DIREKTE
- Presented by: Arve Juritzen
- Country of origin: Norway
- Original language: Norwegian
- No. of seasons: 1

Production
- Running time: 45 minutes

Original release
- Network: TVNorge
- Release: 3 March 2002

Juritzen direkte was a news related talk show that was broadcast by TVNorge in 2002 hosted by Arve Juritzen.

Every program lasted approximately 45 minutes and was ended with a 15-minute segment called arve juritzen Ukestart, where he would interview a person who would influence next weeks news.

The program premiered on 3 March 2002 and aired every Sunday.

== Notable episodes ==
- The Norwegian Church of Scientology is invited to defend their views.
- Runar Søgaard talks about his views on homosexuals.

== Ratings ==
The first episode was watched by 255,000 viewers, but only 148,000 viewers stayed until the end. The second episode was watched by 141,000 viewers.
