= Den rette for Tor =

Norwegian television series

Den rette for Tor was a Norwegian docusoap series which was shown on TV3 in autumn 2007.

Tor Milde (known as a judge on Idol) has to choose between 12 women. However, he has three of his best friends to choose for him: Kåre Magnus Bergh, Tone-Lise Skagefoss and Aslaug Tveiten Ally. In luxurious and extravagant exercises, the three have to choose who will be the best match of the women. Through different tasks and exercises, the panel of friends choose the best personalities. From those, Tor must choose one per week to go on a date with. The prize was to win Tor's "love" with a romantic holiday for two.

Tor finally chose Britt Sande (born 1967), but the two were never a couple.

The series premiered on TV3 on 5 September 2007.
