= Arnt Haugen =

Norwegian accordionist and music journalist

Arnt Haugen (January 3, 1928 – June 26, 1988) was a Norwegian accordionist and music journalist from Kongsberg, known from over 100 LP releases.

Haugen was born in Jondalen in Buskerud county. After studying to be a journalist, he worked for the newspaper Fremtiden and the music journal Rytme from 1955 to 1962. Later he edited Trekkspill-Nytt (Accordion News). Haugen became known as a presenter on NRK, among other things for Istedenfor twist – trekkspillet som ungdommens instrument (Instead of the Twist: The Accordion as a Youth Instrument, 1964), and especially as an orchestra leader on the program Husker du? (Do You Remember? 1971–1986). He also hosted the radio program Trekkspillklubben (The Accordion Club) on NRK for a number of years.

Haugen was the father of the music and sports journalist Thor-Rune Haugen.
