= Jul i Tøyengata =

Norwegian television series

Jul i Tøyengata is a Norwegian televised advent calendar created by the Norwegian comedian Zahid Ali. The show is a parody on another Norwegian advent calendar Jul i Skomakergata from 1979, and is set in Tøyen, Oslo.

The series received a "die throw" of 4 in Verdens Gang, 3 in Dagbladet and another mediocre review in Dagens Næringsliv.

== Cast ==
- Zahid Ali - Shoemaker Ali, Konnerud
- Nikis Theophilakis - Naeem
- Morten Rudå - Varberg
- Siw Anita Andersen - Iram
- Bodil Lahelle - Ms. Konnerud
- Robert Gustafsson - Radko
- Øystein Martinsen - Abel Seidelbaum
- The three Africans: Buntu Pupa, Banthata Mukguatsane and Jimu Makurumbandi
