= Jul i Skomakergata =

Norwegian television series

- Genre: Children's television, Advent calendar
- Created by: NRK
- Starring: Henki Kolstad
- Country of origin: Norway
- Original language: Norwegian
- No. of seasons: 1
- No. of episodes: 24

Production
- Running time: Approx. 15–20 minutes

Original release
- Network: NRK
- Release: 1 December – 24 December 1979

Related
- Jul i Tøyengata (2006 parody)

Jul i Skomakergata is a Norwegian Television program for children, produced in 1979. It is a televised advent calendar, meaning that it was broadcast from December 1 to December 24. It has been broadcast several times in Norway by NRK. The story revolves around shoe repairer Jens Petrus Andersen, played by Henki Kolstad, and his shop. He is visited by friends and townspeople who need their shoes repaired before Christmas, and has a pet named Tøflus (a puppet). A part of the show consists of showing a clip from Sandmännchen (Jon Blund in Norwegian) which tells children about the United Nations' Convention on the Rights of the Child.

In 2006, the Norwegian comedian Zahid Ali created an advent calendar show called Jul i Tøyengata, a parody of Jul i Skomakergata, which shows a multicultural street in Oslo, and deals with problems such as racism and cultural clashes.

== See also ==
- Verdens Gang
