= I kveld med Thomas Giertsen =

- Genre: Talk show
- Written by: Anne Bjørnstad; Henrik Elvestad; Eilif Skodvin; Alice Sommer
- Presented by: Thomas Giertsen; Jon Øigarden; Espen Eckbo
- Country of origin: Norway
- Original language: Norwegian

Production
- Producer: Lasse Hallberg
- Production locations: Scene West Victoria, Oslo
- Running time: 45 minutes

Original release
- Network: TVNorge
- Release: 13 September 1999

I kveld med Thomas Giertsen is a Norwegian talkshow hosted by Thomas Giertsen, that aired on TVNorge.

The show premiered on 13 September 1999 and aired every Monday and Thursday.

== Guests ==
Incomplete list of guests who has appeared on I kveld med Thomas Giertsen.

- Lene Marlin
- Lene Nystrøm
- Åse Kleveland
- Harald Eia
- Espen Thoresen
- Linn Skåber
- Gustav Lorentzen
- Jahn Ivar Jakobsen
- Mette C. Iversen
- Nils Vogt
- Bård Tufte Johansen
- Kinky Friedman
