= Bill.mrk: Bryllup =

- Genre: Reality TV
- Presented by: Guri Solberg
- Country of origin: Norway
- Original language: Norwegian
- No. of seasons: 2
- No. of episodes: 22

Production
- Running time: 60 minutes (including commercials)

Original release
- Network: TV3
- Release: 8 March 2004 – 2004

Bill.mrk: Bryllup was a Norwegian reality TV series broadcast on TV3 in 2004. The program was produced by Strix Televisjon AS.

One woman was going to meet as many men as she could during the course of 45 days. Each man got at least 24 hours with her, then she could ask the next man to come in. At the same time she was going to prepare her own wedding, so everything could be set up so she could be married in the last episode. The show was hosted by Guri Solberg.

The show was broadcast for two seasons, during the spring and autumn of 2004. In the first season Bente Hafslund was the woman getting married, in the second season Ann-Kristin Gresby. Neither ended up being married on the show .

== Criticism ==
After the series ended, several contestants spoke out and said that they felt disrespected by the production company, that they were directed and controlled to say and do things they did not really want to do .
