= Singel 24-7 =

- Genre: Reality TV
- Created by: Lasse Hallberg
- Presented by: Trygve Rønningen
- Country of origin: Norway
- Original language: Norwegian
- No. of seasons: 1

Production
- Producer: Lasse Hallberg
- Production location: Fornebu
- Running time: 60 minutes (Including commercials)

Original release
- Network: TV3
- Release: 2004

Singel 24-7 was a Norwegian reality TV series that aired on TV3.

5 boys and 5 girls will live together in a house and try to find a partner. 2 people will try and split up the other couples. In Singel 24-7 none of the contestants will get voted out. The viewers can choose which contestants will be living together. In Singel 24-7 Direkte two of the couples will each week be split up.

The 2 single contestants will each week get an assignment where they will be competing against each other. The winner of the assignment will get to choose who he or she will be living with for the next week, and can also take him or her out on a romantic date. Who the other single contestant will be living with is the viewers choice.

== Contestants ==
Contestants on Singel 24-7

Name	Age	Hometown	Profession
Kristian Eide	24	Bergen	Student BI
Aleksander Paus	24	Bærum	Student/Computer technician
Yann Gloux	22	Stavanger	Bouncer
Christian Jørgensen	31	Trondheim	
Jim Klausen	25	Tønsberg	Owns a business
Porang Emamdost	24	Skien	Student
Trude Hagen	26	Seljord	Decorator
Malin Andersen	23	Fredrikstad	Manager for a clothing store
Jorun Wisløff	21	Kristiansand	Works in a store/model
Malin Moen	21	Kristiansand	Nurse student
Maria Ødemark	21	Askim	Pharmacist

Anita N Jensen 23 Oslo/Kvinnherad Sale

== Ratings ==
The series opened with 252 000 viewers, but a week after Singel 24-7 had only 105 000 viewers. The final episode was watched by 64 000 viewers, and the whole series had an average of 62 000 viewers.
