= Charterfeber =

- Genre: Docu-soap
- Country of origin: Norway
- Original language: Norwegian
- No. of seasons: 6
- No. of episodes: 45

Production
- Production locations: Oslo, Norway; Gran Canaria, Spain; Crete, Greece; Mallorca, Spain; Cyprus; Tenerife, Spain; Kos, Greece
- Running time: 60 minutes (Including commercials)

Original release
- Network: TV3
- Release: 26 March 2006 – present

Charterfeber is a Norwegian docu-soap that debuted in March 2006.

The show is about Norwegians traveling on a fully chartered vacation to southern Europe. The last time the program was sent on Norwegian television, TV3, was in December 2012. TV3 and the production company, Rakett Film & TV, have just released information about an upcoming season of the series.

== Destinations ==
- Season 1 (2006): Gran Canaria, Spain
- Season 2 (2007): Crete, Greece
- Season 3 (2008): Mallorca, Spain
- Season 4 (2008 : Cyprus
- Season 5 (2009): Tenerife, Spain
- Season 6 (2010): Kos, Greece
