= Heia Norge (TV program) =

Norwegian television series

Heia Norge was a television program that aired on the Norwegian Broadcasting Corporation from 1988 to 1998.

It was inaugurated in late 1988. Originally labeled as a "Norge rundt for youths", it was soon changed to a general entertainment program for youths. From the start it was run out of Trondheim and hosted by one child and one grown-up, but often changed hosts.

It was discontinued in 1998 and replaced with the program Ung@, to reflect a new "Internet age".
