= Halvseint =

Norwegian satirical TV series

- Presented by: Captain Felix
- Country of origin: Norway
- Original language: Norwegian
- No. of seasons: 2
- No. of episodes: 10

Production
- Running time: 25 minutes

Original release
- Network: NRK1
- Release: 6 September 2007 – 24 April 2008

Halvseint is an animated satirical chatshow that premièred on the Norwegian TV channel NRK1 in 2007. The show is hosted by Captain Felix (Rune Nilson) and his sidekick Amy (Ingrid Gjessing Linhave) who interview both known guests and fictional characters. Halvseint is the first animated series that NRK has produced. The first season constituted six 25 minute episodes and one Christmas special that aired on 24 December 2007. The second season started on 3 April 2008 and lasted four episodes.

== Guest characters ==
- Heinrich Stammler, also known as "Mr. Party With Beer", is a man with short cut platinum-blond hair, speaking English with a strong German accent.
- Kurt Nilsen
- Ari Behn
- Siv Jensen
- Sissel Kyrkjebø
- Carl I. Hagen
- Jahn Teigen

== Original creators ==
- Mattis Folkestad (chief animator)
- Barbara Jahn
- Marius Hoel

== Animators ==
- Øyvind Tangseth
- Siv Nordsveen
- Pil Cappelen Smith
- Kristoffer Drageset
- Espen Alme Ellingsen
- Siren Halvorsen
