= Internatet =

- Genre: Reality television
- Country of origin: Norway
- Original language: Norwegian
- No. of seasons: 1

Production
- Running time: 60 minutes (including commercials)

Original release
- Network: TVNorge
- Release: 14 September 2005

Internatet is a Norwegian reality television series that aired on TVNorge.

The premiere was on 14 September 2005 and has aired for one season.

== Plot ==
20 boys and girls in their teens live like teens did in 1955. The teens live several weeks at a boarding school and live under the rules they had in the 1950s.

== Ratings ==
The first season of Internatet had close to 400,000 viewers.
