= List of Norske Talenter acts =

List of all acts in Norske Talenter.

Name	Series	Act	Finished
Aaro Petrus Kontio	2	Diabolo Artist	Finalist
Absence & Blipp	2	Breakdance Group & Beatboxer	Finalist
Alexander Haugaas	2	Card Tricker	Semi-Finalist
Al-X & Sim-1	1	Rap Duo	Semi-Finalist (Lost Judges' Vote)
Anders Haram	1	Singer	Semi-Finalist
Arez Mehraban	2	Hand Balance Artist	Wild Card (Auditioner)
Baard Kolstad	2	Drum Soloist	Semi-Finalist (3rd Place Wild Cards)
Bergens Munnspillorkester	2	Harmonica Orchestra & Singer	Semi-Finalist
Bjørn-Erik Ulvatne	2	Classical Singer	Semi-Finalist
Brian Aksnes Hoseth	2	Magician	Finalist (3rd Place)
Celina Hristov	1	Singer	Finalist
Christer & Pål	2	Comedian Duo	Semi-Finalist
Cre-8	2	Hip Hop Dance Troupe	Semi-Finalist
Daniel Larsen	1	Magician	Semi-Finalist
Diem Tran	2	Pianist	Semi-Finalist
Draup	1	Glass Music Duo	Finalist
Duolva Duottar	1	Rap Group	Finalist
Eirik Gjendemsjø	2	Singer	Semi-Finalist (Lost Judges' Vote)
Erlend Bratland	1	Singer	Winner
Frikar Dance Company	1	Folk Dance Troupe	Finalist
Fredrikstad Turnforening	1	Acrobatics Troupe	Semi-Finalist
Glassbalance	1	Glass Balance Duo	Semi-Finalist
Hanna K. Bogetveit	1	Acrobatic Artist	Semi-Finalist (Lost Judges' Vote)
Hanne Marie and Jørgen	1	Ballroom Dancing Couple	Semi-Finalist
Henrik Nordin	2	Locking/Popping/Hip Hop Dancer	Semi-Finalist
Håkon Ricardo Storstadmo	2	Opera Singer	Finalist
Ingve Connolly Gran	2	Impersonator	Semi-Finalist
Irlin Finsådal	1	Dancer	Semi-Finalist
Jan Anders Presthus	2	Tap Dancer	Semi-Finalist
Jan Are Sæther	2	Drill Performer	Semi-Finalist
John Chen	2	Pianist	Semi-Finalist
John Stistrup	2	Michael Jackson Impersonator/Dancer	Wild Card (Auditioner)
Kjetil Løberg	1	Instrumentalist	Semi-Finalist
Lene Hosøy	2	Singer & Guitarist	Semi-Finalist (Lost Judges' Vote)
Little Superstars	2	Indian Dance Troupe	Semi-Finalist
Lydia Hoen Tjore	2	Classical Singer	Finalist (Runner-Up)
Madeleine Christensen	1	Singer	Finalist
Magic Touch	1	Magician Duo	Semi-Finalist
Mâret Hildur Stueng	2	Yoiker	Semi-Finalist
Maria & Ingrid	1	Circus Act	Semi-Finalist
Marika Lejon	2	Singer	Semi-Finalist
Martin Drop	1	Stand-Up Comedian	Semi-Finalist
Martin Hemmer	2	Motorcycle Stunts Performer	Semi-Finalist
Martin M. Olsen	1	Saxophonist	Semi-Finalist
Mathias & Benjamin	1	Juggling Duo	Semi-Finalist (Lost Judges' Vote)
Mats D. Weinholdt	1	Football Tricker	Finalist
Maximillian Berle-Østraat	2	Poetry Writer	Wild Card (Auditioner)
Narve & Christoffer	1	Stone Breaking Duo	Semi-Finalist
New Age Ninjas	1	Tricking Troupe	Semi-Finalist
Nora Foss al-Jabri	1	Singer	Finalist (3rd Place)
Oddvar Torsheim	1	Folk Singer & Harmonica Player	Semi-Finalist
Ole Gaasø	2	Pianist	Semi-Finalist
Pernille Brenni Brovold	2	Musical Show Dancer	Semi-Finalist (Lost Judges' Vote/2nd Place Wild Cards)
Popping Grandpa	2	Popping Dancer	Semi-Finalist
Quick Style	2	Hip Hop Dance Group	Winner
Renate Aasen	1	Singer	Semi-Finalist
René Skar	2	Rapper	Finalist
Robert Smith-Hald	2	Singer & Guitarist	Semi-Finalist
Robin Palmer Olsen	1	Pianist	Semi-Finalist
Røa Eldresenter	2	Rap Troupe	Finalist
Sebastian James Hekneby	2	Singer	Finalist
Sérgio Louis Perreria	1	Juggler	Semi-Finalist
Sigurd Uggen	1	Backward Talker	Semi-Finalist
Sondre, Maria & Cecilie	1	Swing Dancers	Semi-Finalist
Soulstars	1	Hip Hop Dance Troupe	Semi-Finalist
Sunniva Gynild	1	Flamenco Dancer	Semi-Finalist
Team Mem	1	Tricking Troupe	Semi-Finalist
Thea B. Kristensen	1	Acrobatic Artist	Semi-Finalist
Thomi & Dani	1	Magician/Comedian Duo	Finalist
Tina Presthus	1	Violinist	Semi-Finalist
TX Vikings	1	Freakshow Troupe	Semi-Finalist
Urban Tribe	2	Afro Fusion Dance Troupe	Semi-Finalist
Vegard F. Dommersnes	1	Hula Hoop Artist	Finalist (Runner-Up)
Vilde Håkonsen	1	Acrobatic Artist	Semi-Finalist
Yasmin Breistein	1	"Acrobatic-Ring" Artist	Semi-Finalist (Lost Judges' Vote)
