= Norske Talenter series 7 =

Norske Talenter
- Series 7
- Hosted by: Solveig Kloppen
- Judges: Linn Skåber; Suleman Malik; Bjarne Brøndbo; Mia Gundersen
- Winner: Odin Landbakk
- Runner-up: Patrick Jørgensen

Release
- Original network: TV 2
- Original release: 18 August – 27 November 2015

Series chronology
- Next → Series 8

The seventh series of the Norwegian talent show Norske Talenter was broadcast beginning on 18 August 2015. Mia Gundersen returned with three new judges: Bjarne Brøndbo, Suleman Malik and Linn Skåber. The host Solveig Kloppen also returned. The young guitarist Odin Landbakk was announced as the winner on 27 November 2015; he was the first guitarist to win the show and Rapper Patrick Jørgensen finished as runner-up.

== New additions ==
For the first time, the series had a golden buzzer which has been introduced into Got Talent shows worldwide: each judge can press once during the auditions, and if they press it the act which receives it goes straight through to the live shows. Linn Skåber golden buzzed songwriter and rapper Patrick Jørgensen, Bjarne Brøndbo golden buzzed the young classical crossover singer Sigrid Haanshus, and Suleman Malik golden buzzed the singer Ronia Keyvan.

=== Semi-finalists ===
Winner
the
Runner-up
Finalist

Golden buzzer
Buzzed

Name of act	Act	Semi-final	Result
Odin Landbakk	13 Year Old Guitarist	5	Winner
Patrick Jørgensen	Rapper	2	Runner-up
Slogmåkane	Singing Group	4	Finalist (won public vote)
Lars Hansen	Opera Singer	1	Finalist (won public vote)
Zeven Up	Dance Group	3	Finalist (won public vote)
Michael Xzwer Kildal	Rapper	6	Finalist (won public vote)
Fusion Crew	Dance Group	4	Finalist (won public vote)
Kari Høgh Arnesen	Singer	2	Finalist (won public vote)
Aces Crew	Dance Group	1	Finalist (won public vote)
Sigrid Haanshus	Singer	5	Finalist (won public vote)
Magne	Poet	3	Finalist (won public vote)
Marius Grønsdal	Singer	6	Finalist (won public vote)
Olav Elias And Amalie	Singer	1	Eliminated
Eline Høyer	Singer	1	Eliminated
Ronia Keyvan	Singer	1	Eliminated
Bueno	Harpist	1	Eliminated
Svalnardo from Svalbard	Circus Performers	1	Eliminated
Kevin André Boine	Rapper	1	Eliminated
Zevin De Crosten	Singer	1	Eliminated
Funk	Dance Group	2	Eliminated
Mathias Nondal Lereim	Beatboxer	2	Eliminated
Chris Pettersen viser	Balancer	2	Eliminated
Michael Mendoza tryller	Magician	2	Eliminated
Baba Soul & the Professors of Funk	Singers	2	Eliminated
The Monday People	Singers	2	Eliminated
Mats Knutsen	Launchpad	3	Eliminated
Jocelyn Wana	Singer	3	Eliminated
Flying Superkids	Acrobats	3	Eliminated
Frode Bodin	Singer And Guitarist	3	Eliminated
Carina	Dancer	3	Eliminated
Omar & Fabe	Rapper	3	Eliminated
Jenny Augusta Orchestra	Singer	3	Eliminated
Marius Hantho	Rapper	4	Eliminated
Jone Bjerga	Singer	4	Eliminated
Fredrik Sandem Jensen	Arrow Shooting	4	Eliminated
Benjamin Larsen	Dancer	4	Eliminated
Hedda Johannesen leker	Chemistry	4	Eliminated
Morten Samuelsen	Singer	4	Eliminated
Fifi von tassel	Dancer	4	Eliminated
Rap4mation	Rappers	5	Eliminated
Eldos Ghayret	Singer	5	Eliminated
Helene Skaugen	Belly Dancer	5	Eliminated
Erik Mogeno	Ventriloquist	5	Eliminated
Aleksander & Mira	Aerial Acrobatics	5	Eliminated
Ørjan Vatne Trio	Singer	5	Eliminated
Oda Berg	Opera Singer	5	Eliminated
Khattab Badraddin	Magician	6	Eliminated
Benjamin Kittelsen	Beatboxer	6	Eliminated
Skranglebein	Rapper	6	Eliminated
Narthana Kaviyaa	Dance Group	6	Eliminated
Rune Nordbye	Spoon Player	6	Eliminated
Mathias Lind	Dancer	6	Eliminated
Timbersports	Wood Chopping	6	Eliminated

== Semifinals ==
The Semifinals started 16 October 2015 54 acts made it through from judges cuts. 9 acts perform each week with 6 Semifinals taking place 2 acts every week advance to the grand final on 27 November 2015. Each judge have a buzzer in front of them like previous series if an act reserves four x's the act will be over but everyone can still vote at home. Suleman Malik buzzed in semifinal 4 as he buzzed Fifi von tassel while Mia buzzed spoon player Rune Nordbye in semifinal 6.

Key	Buzzed	Advanced

== Semifinal 1 ==
Order	Artist	Act	Buzzes				Finished
Order	Artist	Act	Skåber	Malik	Brøndbo	Gundersen	Finished
1	Olav Elias And Amalie	Dancers					Eliminated
2	Eline Høyer	Singer					Eliminated
3	Ronia Keyvan	Singer					Eliminated
4	Bueno	Harpist					Eliminated
5	Lars Hansen	Opera Singer					Advanced
6	Svalnardo from Svalbard	Circus Performers					Eliminated
7	Kevin André Boine	Rapper					Eliminated
8	Zevin De Crosten	Singer					Eliminated
9	Aces Crew	Dance Group					Advanced

== Semifinal 2 ==
Order	Artist	Act	Buzzes				Finished
Order	Artist	Act	Skåber	Malik	Brøndbo	Gundersen	Finished
1	Funk	Dance Group					Eliminated
2	Mathias Nondal Lereim	Beatboxer					Eliminated
3	Chris Pettersen viser	Balancer					Eliminated
4	Kari Høgh Arnesen	Singer					Advanced
5	Michael Mendoza tryller	Magician					Eliminated
6	Baba Soul & the Professors of Funk	Singers					Eliminated
7	Patrick Jørgensen	Rapper					Advanced
8	Baba Soul & the Professors of Funk	Singers					Eliminated
9	The Monday People	Singers					Eliminated

== Semifinal 3 ==
Order	Artist	Act	Buzzes				Finished
Order	Artist	Act	Skåber	Malik	Brøndbo	Gundersen	Finished
1	Mats Knutsen	Launchpad		Winner			Eliminated
2	Jocelyn Wana	Singer					Eliminated
3	Flying Superkids	Acrobats					Eliminated
4	Frode Bodin	Singer And Guitarist					Eliminated
5	Carina	Dancer					Eliminated
6	Omar & Fabe	Rappers					Eliminated
7	Magne	Poet					Advanced
8	Zeven Up	Dance Group					Advanced
9	Jenny Augusta Orchestra	Singer	Winner				Eliminated

== Semifinal 4 ==
Order	Artist	Act	Buzzes				Finished
Order	Artist	Act	Skåber	Malik	Brøndbo	Gundersen	Finished
1	Marius Hantho	Rapper					Eliminated
2	Jone Bjerga	Singer					Eliminated
3	Fredrik Sandem Jensen	Arrow Shooting					Eliminated
4	Benjamin Larsen	Dancer					Eliminated
5	Hedda Johannesen leker	Chemistry					Eliminated
6	Slogmåkane	Singers					Advanced
7	Morten Samuelsen	Singer					Eliminated
8	Fusion Crew	Dancers					Advanced
9	Fifi von tassel	Dancer					Eliminated

== Semifinal 5 ==
Order	Artist	Act	Buzzes				Finished
Order	Artist	Act	Skåber	Malik	Brøndbo	Gundersen	Finished
1	Rap4mation	Rappers					Eliminated
2	Eldos Ghayret	Singer					Eliminated
3	Helene Skaugen	Belly Dancer					Eliminated
4	Erik Mogeno	Ventriloquist					Eliminated
5	Aleksander & Mira	Aerial Acrobatics					Eliminated
6	Ørjan Vatne Trio	Singer					Eliminated
7	Oda Berg	Opera Singer					Eliminated
8	Odin Landbakk	13 Year Old Guitarist					Advanced
9	Sigrid Haanshus	Singer					Advanced

== Semifinal 6 ==
Order	Artist	Act	Buzzes				Finished
Order	Artist	Act	Skåber	Malik	Brøndbo	Gundersen	Finished
1	Khattab Badraddin	Magician					Eliminated
2	Benjamin Kittelsen	Beatboxer					Eliminated
3	Skranglebein	Rapper					Eliminated
4	Narthana Kaviyaa	Dance Group					Eliminated
5	Marius Grønsdal	Singer					Advanced
6	Rune Nordbye	Spoon Player					Eliminated
7	Mathias Lind	Dancer					Eliminated
8	Michael Xzwer Kildal	Rapper					Advanced
9	Timbersports	Wood Chopping					Eliminated

== Final ==
Twelve acts reached the final round, which was broadcast on 27 November 2015.

Order	Artist	Act	Finished
1	Lars Hansen	Opera Singer	Eliminated
2	Zeven Up	Dance Group	Eliminated
3	Michael Xzwer Kildal	Rapper	Eliminated
4	Fusion Crew	Dancers	Eliminated
5	Kari Høgh Arnesen	Singer	Eliminated
6	Odin Landbakk	13 Year Old Guitarist	Winner
7	Aces Crew	Dance Group	Eliminated
8	Sigrid Haanshus	Singer	Eliminated
9	Slogmåkane	Singing Band	3rd place
10	Patrick Jørgensen	Rapper	Runner-up
11	Magne	Poet	Eliminated
12	Marius Grønsdal	Singer	Eliminated
