= Norske Talenter series 2 =

Norske Talenter
- Series 2
- Hosted by: Pia Lykke; Sturla Berg-Johansen
- Judges: Jan Fredrik Karlsen; Mia Gundersen; Thomas Giertsen
- Winner: Quick Style
- Runner-up: Lydia Hoen Tjore

Release
- Original network: TV 2
- Original release: February 13 – May 8, 2009

Series chronology
- ← Previous; Series 1 Next → Series 3

The 2009 series of Norske Talenter was the first series of this television programme. It began airing on TV 2 February 13, 2009 with audition in Bergen, and the live final was held May 8, 2009. The winners this season were the hip hop dance crew Quick Style at the ages 17–18. The runner-up was 14-year-old classical singer Lydia Hoen Tjore and 6-year old magician Brian Aksnes Hoseth finished in third place.

== Judges and hosts ==
- Judges:
  - Jan Fredrik Karlsen (music producer, was a judge in Norwegian Idol many of the seasons and is going to be a judge in X Factor: Norway)
  - Mia Gundersen (actress and singer)
  - Thomas Giertsen (actor and stand-up comedian)
- Presenters (hosts):
  - Pia Lykke
  - Sturla Berg-Johansen

== Auditions ==
Dates auditions were sent on TV:

- February 13 (Bergen): Absence & Blipp
- February 20 (Bergen): Lydia Hoen Tjore, René Skar
- February 27 (Oslo): Quick, Sebastian James Hekneby
- March 6 (Oslo): Røa Eldresenter
- March 13 (Trondheim): Aaro Petrus Kontio, Håkon Ricardo
- March 20 (Trondheim): Brian Aksnes Hoseth

== Semi-finalists ==
Key	Winner	Runner Up	Finalist	Semi-finalist (lost judges' vote)/2nd-3rd place wild cards

Name of Act	Age(s)	Genre	Act	From	Semi	Position Reached
Aaro Petrus Kontio	24	Circus Act	Diabolo	Finland	4	Finalist
Absence & Blipp	18-24	Dancing	Breakdancing & Beatboxing	Bergen	1	Finalist
Alexander Haugaas	16	Magic	Card Tricking	Oslo	2	Semi-finalist
Arez Mehraban	22	Balance	Hand Balance	Trondheim	5	Wild card (auditioner)
Baard Kolstad	17	Instrumental	Drumming	Oslo	3/5	Wild card (semi-finalist)
Bergens Munnspillorkester		Music	Harmonica & Singing	Bergen	2	Semi-finalist
Bjørn-Erik Ulvatne	18	Singing	Singing	Os	2	Semi-finalist
Brian Aksnes Hoseth	6	Magic	Magic	Verdal	1	Finalist
Christer & Pål	19/21	Comedy	Impersonation/Comedy/Acting	Trondheim	4	Semi-finalist
Cre-8		Dancing	Hip Hop Dancing	Oslo	2/5	Wild card (semi-finalist)
Diem Tran	14	Instrumental	Piano Playing	Bergen	2	Semi-finalist
Eirik Gjendemsjø	13	Singing	Singing	Slependen	4	Semi-finalist
Henrik Nordin	11	Dancing	Locking/Popping Dancing	Bergen	3	Semi-finalist
Håkon Ricardo Storstadmo	14	Singing	Opera Singing	Vukku	3	Finalist
Ingve Connolly Gran	24	Comedy	Impersonation	Stavanger	1/5	Wild card (semi-finalist)
Jan Anders Presthus	8	Dancing	Tap Dancing	Stord	4	Semi-finalist
Jan Are Sæther	20	Circus Act	Drilling	Trondheim	1	Semi-finalist
John Chen	16	Instrumental	Piano Playing	Oslo	4	Semi-finalist
John Stistrup	22	Dancing	Michael Jackson Dancing	Sweden	5	Wild card (auditioner)
Lene Hosøy	20	Singing	Singing & Guitar	Osterøy	1	Semi-finalist
Little Superstars	6-9	Dancing	Indian Dancing	Trondheim	2	Semi-finalist
Lydia Hoen Tjore	14	Singing	Classical Singing	Radøy	3/5	Runner-up (semi-finalist lost judges' vote, wild card)
Mâret Hildur Stueng	16	Singing	Yoiking	Sápmi	1	Semi-finalist
Marika Lejon	24	Singing	Singing	Oslo	4	Semi-finalist
Martin Hemmer	19	Sports	Trial Cycling Stunts	Oslo	3	Semi-finalist
Maximillian Berle-Østraat	10	Art	Poetry Writing	Bergen	5	Wild card (auditioner)
Ole Gaasø	17	Instrumental	Piano Playing	Oslo	1	Semi-finalist
Pernille Brenni Brovold	11	Dancing	Acrobatic Broadway Show Dancing	Oslo	2/5	Wild card (semi-finalist)
Popping Grandpa	64	Dancing	Popping Dancing	Oslo	3	Semi-finalist
Quick Style	17-18	Dancing	Hip Hop Dancing	Oslo	3	Winners
René Skar	24	Singing	Rapping	Bergen	2	Finalist
Robert Smith-Hald	41	Singing	Singing & Guitar	Bergen	4	Semi-finalist
Røa Eldresenter	69-83	Singing	Rapping	Røa	4	Finalist
Sebastian James Hekneby	18	Singing	Singing	Tønsberg	2	Finalist
Urban Tribe	13-27	Dancing	Afro Fusion Dancing	Oslo	3	Semi-finalist

== Semi-finals ==
=== Semi-final 1 ===
Nr.	Place came	Artist	Talent	Performance	Buzzers	Result
1	1st (Won Public Vote)	Brian Aksnes Hoseth	Magician	Magic: Performed a magic routine with balloons, a bunny, a bird and a caps	0	Thru
5	2nd (Won Judges' Vote)	Absence & Blipp	Dance Troupe & Beatboxer	Dancing and beatboxing: Performed a breakdance and beatboxing routine dancing to and beatboxing "Everybody Dance Now" and others	0	Thru
8	3rd (Lost Judges' Vote)	Lene Hosøy	Singer	Singing: Performed her own song "Changing Direction"	0	Eliminated
2	Unknown	Bergens Munnspillorkester	Harmonica Orchestra & Singer	Harmonica: Performed their own "laid back" song with more harmonica than song than last time	0	Eliminated
3	Unknown	Mâret Hildur Stueng	Yoiker	Yoik: Performed a yoik for her sick little brother	0	Eliminated
4	Unknown	Jan Are Sæther	Driller	Drill: Performed a drill routine to "Livin' La Vida Loca"	0	Eliminated
6	Unknown	Ole Gaasø	Pianist	Piano: Played Albert Aaberg theme, songs from The Jungle Book and other	0	Eliminated
7	Unknown	Ingve Connolly Gran	Impersonator	Impersonation: Imitated Ingrid Espelid, Gollum, Mika, Janis Joplin, Louis Armstrong and others	0	Eliminated
=== Semi-final 2 ===
5	1st (Won Public Vote)	Sebastian James Hekneby	Singer	Singing: Performed "Unchained Melody" by Alex North and Hy Zaret	0	Thru
2	2nd (Won Judges' Vote)	René Skar	Rapper	Rap: Performed his own made song "Takin' it Home"	0	Thru
4	3rd (Lost Judges' Vote)	Pernille Brenni Brovold	Dancer	Musical dance: Performed a routine as Oliver Twist to "Consider Yourself"	0	Eliminated
1	Unknown	Little Superstars	Dancers	Indian dance: Performed an Indian dance routine	0	Eliminated
3	Unknown	Alexander Haugaas	Magician	Card tricking: Tricked with cards	2	Eliminated
6	Unknown	Cre-8	Dance Troupe	Hip Hop Dance: Danced a routine to a medley including a remix of "Rock It" by Herbie Hancock	0	Eliminated
7	Unknown	Diem Tran	Pianist	Piano: Played a self-made peace	0	Eliminated
8	Unknown	Bjørn-Erik Ulvatne	Singer	Classical singing: Performance of "The Music of the Night" from The Phantom of the Opera	0	Eliminated
=== Semi-final 3 ===
8	1st (Won Public Vote)	Håkon Ricardo Storstadmo	Singer	Opera singing: Performance of "Nessun Dorma"	0	Thru
5	2nd (Won Judges' Vote)	Quick Crew	Dance Troupe	Hip hop dance: Did a routine in white dresses and with eye linces to a self-mixed song	0	Thru
2	3rd (Lost Judges' Vote)	Lydia Hoen Tjore	Singer	Classical singing: Performance of "Time to Say Goodbye"	0	Eliminated
1	Unknown	Urban Tribe	Dance Troupe	Afro fusion dance: Performed an afro fusion routine to a medley of songs included "Up in Her Belly" by Busy Signal	0	Eliminated
3	Unknown	Henrik Nordin	Dancer	Popping/hiphop: Performed a popping routine beginning with a white mask and when the "bad weather" came, he changed to a hip-hop boy dancing hip-hop	0	Eliminated
4	Unknown	Martin Hemmer	Trial-cyclist	Trial: Performed a trial routine with stunts, flames, a car and a woman burglar to Mission Impossible Theme	0	Eliminated
6	Unknown	Popping Grandpa	Dancer	Popping: Performed a popping routine with a paper white flower to "LoveStoned/I Think She Knows" by Justin Timberlake	0	Eliminated
7	Unknown	Baard Kolstad	Drum Soloist	Drums: Performed a drum solo routine playing on drums and other things	0	Eliminated
=== Semi-final 4 ===
8	1st (Won Public Vote)	Aaro Petrus Kontio	Diabolo Artist	Diabolo: Performed a diabolo routine with three diabolos to rock music	0	Thru
5	2nd (Won Judges' Vote)	Røa Eldresenter	Rap Troupe	Rap: Performed their own rap with theme "Røa Røa Røa"	0	Thru
7	3rd (Lost Judges' Vote)	Eirik Gjendemsjø	Singer	Musical singing: Performed "The Outcast" from Chess	0	Eliminated
1	Unknown	Jan Anders Presthus	Tap Dancer	Tap: Performed a tap routine to songs from Singin' in the Rain	0	Eliminated
2	Unknown	Robert Smith-Hald	Singer & Guitarist	Singing: Performed his own song "Little River" from his new album Innocence Said	0	Eliminated
3	Unknown	Christer & Pål	Comedians	Comedy: Performed a comedy routine with Pål impersonating a doll	3	Eliminated
4	Unknown	John Chen	Pianist	Piano: Performed the peace "The Flight of the Bumble Bee"	0	Eliminated
6	Unknown	Marika Lejon	Singer	Singing: Performance of "Perfect Sin"	0	Eliminated
=== Wild cards ===
8	1st (Won Public Vote)	Lydia Hoen Tjore	Singer	Classical singing: Performed "All I Ask" from The Phanthom of the Opera	0	Thru
3	2nd	Pernille Brenni Brovold	Dancer	Musical dancing: Performed a musical Broadway routine to "Stupid Coupid" by Mandy Moore	0	Eliminated
6	3rd	Baard Kolstad	Drum Soloist	Drumming: Performed a drum routine when he drummed at dustbins, coloured water and drums	0	Eliminated
1	Unknown	John Stistrup	Dancer	Michael Jackson impersonating: Danced to a mix of "Thriller", "Bad", "Dangerous" and "Smooth Criminal" by Michael Jackson	0	Eliminated
2	Unknown	Ingve Connolly Gran	Impersonator	Impersonating: Impersonated the Joker from Batman, Solan and Ludvig from Blåklypa Grand Prix and Louis Armstrong	0	Eliminated
4	Unknown	Maximillian Berle-Østraat	Poetry Writer	Poetry: Read his own poetry to violin music	0	Eliminated
5	Unknown	Cre-8	Dance Troupe	Hip hop dancing: Performed a routine to different hip hop song including a remix of "Breakout" by Sean Paul	0	Eliminated
7	Unknown	Arez Mehraban	Handbalancer	Handbalance: Climbed on a "work place" to "Feeling Good" by Michael Bublé	0	Eliminated

== Final ==
Nr.	Place came	Artist	Age(s)	From	Talent	Performance	Result
8	1st	Quick Style	17-18	Oslo	Dance Troupe	Hip hop dance: Performed a routine to a self-mixed song	Winners
2	2nd	Lydia Hoen Tjore	14	Radøy	Singer	Classical singing: Performance of "The Prayer"	Runner-Up
3	3rd	Brian Aksnes Hoseth	6	Verdal	Magician	Magic: Performed a routine with a tent, a teddy bear and a girl	3rd Place
1	4th-9th	Absence & Blipp	18-24	Bergen	Dance Troupe & Beatboxer	Dancing and beatboxing: Performance to "Beat It", "I Like to Move it, Move it" and other songs beatboxing and breakdancing	4th-9th Place
4	4th-9th	Røa Eldresenter	69-83	Røa	Rap Troupe	Rap: Performed a rap of "We Will Rock You"	4th-9th Place
5	4th-9th	Håkon Ricardo Storstadmo	13	Vukku	Opera Singer	Opera singing: Performance of "Torna a Surriento"	4th-9th Place
6	4th-9th	René Skar	24	Fyllingsdalen	Rapper	Rap: Performed his own summer song "Beautiful Day" with many girls on stage	4th-9th Place
7	4th-9th	Aaro Petrus Kontio	24	Finland	Diabolo Artist	Diabolo: Performed a diabolo routine to rock music with 4 burning diabolos + he wore a burning hat	4th-9th Place
9	4th-9th	Sebastian James Hekneby	18	Tønsberg	Singer	Singing: Performed "One Moment in Time" by Whitney Houston	4th-9th Place

== Buzzers ==
1. Semi-final 2: Alexander got 2 buzzers (Jan Fredrik Karlsen and Thomas Giertsen)
2. Semi-final 4: Christer and Pål got all the judges' buzzers

Act	Buzzes		
Act	Karlsen	Gundersen	Giertsen
Alexander Haugaas	X		X
Christer and Pål	X	X	X

== Judges' choices ==
Semi-final	Jan Fredrik Karlsen	Mia Gundersen	Thomas Giertsen	Going thru
Semi-final 1	Lene Hosøy	Absence & Blipp	Absence & Blipp	Absence & Blipp
Semi-final 2	René Skar	René Skar	René Skar	René Skar
Semi-final 3	Lydia Hoen Tjore	Quick Style	Quick Style	Quick Style
Semi-final 4	Røa Eldresenter	Eirik Gjendemsjø	Røa Eldresenter	Røa Eldresenter

== Finalists ==
=== Absence & Blipp ===
Absence & Blipp (Absence Crew) is a dance crew with a beatboxer. The dance crew is called Absence and the beatboxer called Blipp. Members: Stian "Blipp" Glopholm (beatboxer), Ole Petter "Hoolio" Knarvik, Piero "Piero the Hero" Issa, Andreas "Rocks" Roksvåg and Christopher "Birdy" Bottolfsen. They were absent in Dansefeber (season 2) when Knarvik, Issa and Roksvåg made it to the Fever Days. Only Knarvik made it to the live shows and finished in 10th place. The ages in the crew is 18–24. In the final, they was unhappy with the sound, because TV 2 made a mistake. They had to perform 15 seconds without sound.

=== Lydia ===
Lydia Hoen Tjore (14) is a classical singer. She came runner-up in the competition. She is from Radøy Municipality near Bergen and has a little brother, David, who also tried for Norske Talenter, but didn't make it to the semi-finals. Lydia was in the 3rd semi-final where she didn't got thru. She was picked to be in the wild cards, and then she won the public vote and got to the final.

=== Brian ===
6-year old Brian Aksnes Hoseth is the youngest contestant in the competition and is a magician. Now he has sold an own magician set for children. Brian's father, Boje Hoseth, came to the semi-finals last year with Håvard Sand where they called themselves Magic Touch. This inspired Brian to try in the competition.

=== Røa Eldresenter ===
Røa Eldresenter is the oldest in the competition, along with Bergens Munnspillorkester. The front artist Mette is 69, and the others in the ages 71–83. They are in the Røa older senter in Oslo. Many young people shows respect for them. They are a rap group with only Mette rapping and the others standing and being cool.

=== Håkon Ricardo ===
Håkon Ricardo Storstadmo became an opera singer at the age of 13. When he tried for the show, he was 13. He comes from Vuku in Verdal in Nord- Trøndelag, Norway. He was born in the Philippines. He sings arias in Italian language mostly. He wants to perform in large venues and sing opera to the people and make it more popular.

=== René ===
René Skar (24) is a rapper from Fyllingsdalen in Bergen Municipality. Sams.B makes the beats. René (a.k.a. RudeRen) and Stig (a.k.a. Sams.B) has a duo name called The D-Techs. René previously belonged to the rap crew CrippleCrew. René has a son named Shawn-Kevin. René wants him to be a doctor or something important. René wants to show him that nothing is impossible. René's good word for him is Sky Is the Limit.

=== Aaro ===
Aaro Petrus Kontio (24) is a diabolo artist. In the final, he diaboloed with 4 diabolos. Aaro comes from Finland, but lives now in Trondheim. Aaro got to the auditions together with his girlfriend from Finland, Tiina. She auditioned, with the circus talent trapes. She didn't make it to the semi-finals, but Aaro did. Aaro always performs his diabolo routines to rock/punk music.

=== Quick Style ===
Quick Style (17-18), a dance group with 3 Hip Hop dancers and a B-Boy. They ended up as winners of the competition.

=== Sebastian ===
Sebastian James Hekneby (18) is a singer. He is a big fan of Michael Jackson. He did some MJ dance moves in the final. In the final, TV 2 made a mistake with the sound, that sounded like he was screaming at the middle of the song. At the auditions, Jan Fredrik Karlsen said "Now, a new star is born on that stage" when he sang "You Raise Me Up". At the semi-finals he sang "Unchained Melody" and "One Moment in Time" in the final.
