= Brøndbo =

Brøndbo is a Norwegian surname. Notable people with the surname include:

- Bjarne Brøndbo (born 1964), Norwegian vocalist
- Eskil Brøndbo (born 1970), Norwegian drummer
- Rune Brøndbo (born 1968), Norwegian jazz musician and composer
