= Norske Talenter series 9 =

Season of Norwegian television series

Norske Talenter
- Series 9
- Hosted by: Solveig Kloppen
- Judges: Mia Gundersen; Mona Berntsen; Bjarne Brøndbo; Janne Formoe

Release
- Original network: TV 2
- Original release: 2018

Series chronology
- ← Previous; Series 8

The ninth series of the Norwegian talent show Norske Talenter was broadcast in 2018.

Key	Buzzed	Advanced

== Semifinal 1 ==
Order	Artist	Act	Buzzes				Finished
Order	Artist	Act	Gundersen	Berntsen	Brøndbo	Formoe	Finished
1	Nanette Haugan	Dancers					Eliminated
2	Captain John McDonald	Singer					Eliminated
3	Kristine Emilie	Violinist					Eliminated
4	William Winther	Magician					Eliminated
5	Tuva Lutro	Singer					Advanced
6	Vossarebels	Singer					Eliminated
7	Dansegruppa Pycho	Dance Group					Eliminated
8	Rune Carlsen	Rubix Cube Solver					Advanced
9	Sara Rønne	Aerial Performer					Eliminated
