= Norske Talenter series 1 =

Norske Talenter
- Series 1
- Hosted by: Marte Stokstad; Sturla Berg-Johansen
- Judges: Jan Fredrik Karlsen; Mia Gundersen; Thomas Giertsen
- Winner: Erlend Bratland
- Runner-up: Vegard F. Dommersnes

Release
- Original network: TV 2

Series chronology
- Next → Series 2

The 2008 series of Norske Talenter was the first series of the programme. It aired on TV 2 with 16-year-old singer Erlend Bratland as the winner and 8-year-old hula hoop artist Vegard F. Dommersnes was the runner-up.

== Judges and hosts ==
- Judges:
  - Jan Fredrik Karlsen (music producer, was a judge in Norwegian Idol many of the seasons and is going to be a judge in X Factor: Norway)
  - Mia Gundersen (actress and singer)
  - Thomas Giertsen (actor and stand-up comedian)
- Presenters (hosts):
  - Marte Stokstad
  - Sturla Berg-Johansen (also be a host in 2009)

== Auditions ==
They had auditions in Oslo, Bergen, Trondheim and Kristiansand.

== Semi-finalists ==
Key	Winner	Runner-Up	Finalist	Semi-finalist (lost judges' vote)

Name of Act	Age(s)	Genre	Act	From	Semi	Position Reached
Al-X & Sim-1		Rap	Comedy Rap		5	Semi-finalist
Anders Haram		Singing	Singing & Guitar		2	Semi-finalist
Celina Hristov	7	Singing	Singing		1	Finalist
Daniel Larsen		Illusion	Illusion Magic Act		1	Semi-finalist
Draup		Music	Glass Music	Bergen	5	Finalist
Duolva Duottar		Rap	Rap On Sami Language	Sápmi	1	Finalist
Erlend Bratland	16	Singing	Singing	Kvinnherad	5	Winner
Frikar Dance Company		Dancing	Traditional Folk Dance		3	Finalist
Fredrikstad Turnforening		Acrobatics	Rhythmical Gymnastics	Fredrikstad	4	Semi-finalist
Glassbalance		Circus Act	Glass Balance		2	Semi-finalist
Hanna K. Bogetveit		Acrobatics	Rhythmical Gymnastics		4	Semi-finalist
Hanne Marie & Jørgen		Dancing	Latin Ballroom Dancing	Bergen	5	Semi-finalist
Irlin Finsådal	17	Dancing	Michael Jackson Dancing	Vennesla	3	Semi-finalist
Kjetil Løberg		Music	Strange Instruments Playing	Trondheim	1	Semi-finalist
Madeleine Christensen	14	Singing	Singing	Bergen	2	Finalist
Magic Touch		Magic	Illusion Magic Act	Verdal	3	Semi-finalist
Maria & Ingrid		Circus Act	Circus Act		4	Semi-finalist
Martin Drop	11	Comedy	Stand-Up Comedy		2	Semi-finalist
Martin M. Olsen		Instrumental Music	Saxophone		4	Semi-finalist
Mathias & Benjamin		Circus Act	Juggling		1	Semi-finalist
Mats D. Weinholdt		Sports	Football Tricks		4	Finalist
Narve & Christoffer		Streinght Act	Breaking Stones		3	Semi-finalist
New Age Ninjas		Martial Arts Demo	Tricking	Bergen	1	Semi-finalist
Nora Foss al-Jabri	12	Singing	Singing		3	Finalist
Oddvar Torsheim		Music	Folk Singing & Harmonica Playing		2	Semi-finalist
Renate Aasen		Singing	Singing		3	Semi-finalist
Robin Palmer Olsen		Instrument	Piano Playing		5	Semi-finalist
Sérgio Louis Perreria		Circus Act	Juggling		5	Semi-finalist
Sigurd Uggen		Extrodnary Act	Backward Talking		4	Semi-finalist
Sondre, Maria & Cecilie		Dancing	Swing Dancing		2	Semi-finalist
Soulstars		Dancing	Hip Hop Dancing	Oslo	2	Semi-finalist
Sunniva Gynild	6	Dancing	Flamenco Dancing	Bergen	5	Semi-finalist
Team Mem		Martial Arts Demo	Tricking		5	Semi-finalist
Thea B. Christensen		Acrobatics	Air Acrobatics		4	Semi-finalist
Thomi & Dani		Comedy	Magic & Comedy	Bergen	4	Finalist
Tina Presthus		Instrument	Violin Playing	Stord	1	Semi-finalist
TX Vikings		Freakshow	Freakshow Streingth Act		1	Semi-finalist
Vegard F. Dommersnes	8	Circus Act	Hula Hoop		2	Runner-Up
Vilde Håkonsen		Acrobatics	Rhythmical Gymnastics		3	Semi-finalist
Yasmin Breistein		Circus Act	"Acrobatic Ring"		3	Semi-finalist

== Semi-finals ==
=== Semi-final 1 ===
Place came	Artist	Talent	Result
1st (Won Public Vote)	Celina Hristov	Singer	Thru
2nd (Won Judges' Vote)	Duolva Duottar	Rap Troupe	Thru
3rd (Lost Judges' Vote)	Mathias & Benjamin	Juggling Duo	Eliminated
Unknown	TX Vikings	Freakshow Performers	Eliminated
Unknown	New Age Ninjas	Tricking Troupe	Eliminated
Unknown	Kjetil Løberg	Instrumentalist	Eliminated
Unknown	Daniel Larsen	Magician	Eliminated
Unknown	Tina Presthus	Violinist	Eliminated
=== Semi-final 2 ===
1st (Won Public Vote)	Madeleine Christensen	Singer	Thru
2nd (Won Judges' Vote)	Vegard F. Dommersnes	Hula Hoop Artist	Thru
3rd (Lost Judges' Vote)	Sondre, Maria & Cecilie	Swing Dancers	Eliminated
Unknown	Soulstars	Hip Hop Dance Troupe	Eliminated
Unknown	Glassbalance	Glass Balance Duo	Eliminated
Unknown	Oddvar Torsheim	Singer	Eliminated
Unknown	Martin Drop	Stand-up Comedian	Eliminated
Unknown	Anders Haram	Singer	Eliminated
=== Semi-final 3 ===
1st (Won Public Vote)	Nora Foss al-Jabri	Singer	Thru
2nd (Won Judges' Vote)	Frikar Dance Company	Traditional Folk Dance Troupe	Thru
3rd (Lost Judges' Vote)	Yasmin Breistein	"Acrobatic-Ring" Artist	Eliminated
Unknown	Vilde Håkonsen	Rhythmical Gymnastics Performer	Eliminated
Unknown	Renate Aasen	Singer	Eliminated
Unknown	Narve & Christoffer	Stone-Breakers	Eliminated
Unknown	Irlin Finsådal	Dancer	Eliminated
Unknown	Magic Touch	Magicians	Eliminated
=== Semi-final 4 ===
1st (Won Public Vote)	Mats D. Weinholdt	Football Tricker	Thru
2nd (Won Judges' Vote)	Thomi & Dani	Magician-Comedians	Thru
3rd (Lost Judges' Vote)	Hanna K. Bogetveit	Rhythmical Gymnastics Performer	Eliminated
Unknown	Thea Blossom Kristensen	Air Acrobatics Performer	Eliminated
Unknown	Fredrikstad Turnforening	Acrobatics Troupe	Eliminated
Unknown	Sigurd Uggen	Backward Talker	Eliminated
Unknown	Martin M. Olsen	Saxophonist	Eliminated
Unknown	Maria & Ingrid	Circus Artists	Eliminated
=== Semi-final 5 ===
1st (Won Public Vote)	Erlend Bratland	Singer	Thru
2nd (Won Judges' Vote)	Draup	Glass Music Duo	Thru
3rd (Lost Judges' Vote)	Al-X & Sim-1	Rap Duo	Eliminated
Unknown	Team Mem	Tricking Troupe	Eliminated
Unknown	Sunniva Gynild	Flamenco Dancer	Eliminated
Unknown	Sérgio Louis Perreria	Juggler	Eliminated
Unknown	Robin Palmer Olsen	Pianist	Eliminated
Unknown	Hanne Marie & Jørgen	Latin Ballroom Dancing Couple	Eliminated

== Final ==
Place came	Artist	Category	Act	Semi-final	Result
1st Place (Won the Series)	Erlend Bratland	Singing	Performance of "Lost" by Anouk	5 (public's choice)	Winner
2nd Place	Vegard F. Dommersnes	Hula Hoop	Hula Hoop Performance to "Hound Dog" by Elvis Presley and other songs	2 (judges' choice)	Runner-Up
Bottom 7	Nora Foss al-Jabri	Singing	Performance of "Anthem" from Chess	3 (public's choice)	Finalist
Bottom 7	Draup	Music	Playing on Glasses	5 (judges' choice)	Finalist
Bottom 7	Mats D. Weinholdt	Football	Tricked with a Burning Football	4 (public's choice)	Finalist
Bottom 7	Thomi & Dani	Comedy & Magic	Performed a Comic Magic Routine	4 (judges' choice)	Finalist
Bottom 7	Frikar Dance Company	Folk Dance	Performed a Traditional Folk Dance Routine Beginning with a Hip Hop Beat	3 (judges' choice)	Finalist
Bottom 7	Madeleine Christensen	Singing	Performance of "A Moment Like This" by Kelly Clarkson	2 (public's choice)	Finalist
Bottom 7	Celina Hristov	Singing	Performance of "My Heart Will Go On" by Celine Dion	1 (public's choice)	Finalist
Bottom 7	Duolva Duottar	Rap	Performed a Rap Routine on Sami Language	1 (judges' choice)	Finalist
