= Norske Talenter series 8 =

Season of television series

Norske Talenter
- Series 8
- Hosted by: Solveig Kloppen
- Judges: Bjarne Brøndbo; Mia Gundersen; Suleman Malik; Linn Skåber
- Winner: Vilde Winge
- Runner-up: Gemini Crew

Release
- Original network: TV 2
- Original release: 13 January – 17 May 2017

Series chronology
- ← Previous; Series 7 Next → Series 9

The eighth series of Norske Talenter, Norway's edition of the Got Talent franchise, premiered on 13 January 2017, after a one-year hiatus. Judges Mia Gundersen, Bjarne Brøndbo, Suleman Malik, and Linn Skåber all returned, and Solveig Kloppen remained the host. The winner was 14-year-old sign language interpreter Vilde Winge. Although Winde performed her interpreting to music, this was the first time the winner of the show was not a vocalist, instrumentalist, or a dancer in the traditional sense of the term and first-place. Second-place was taken by the dance duo Gemini Crew (both 18 years old).

== Golden buzzers ==
This was the second series to include a "golden buzzer", which sends an auditioning act directly to the live shows.

Name of act	Type of act	Position reached	Golden buzzer from
Mathias Rugsveen	accordion player	third place	Solveig Kloppen
Vilde Winge	sign language interpreter	winner	Linn Skåber
	dance group		Mia Gundersen
Shelmith	dancer		Suleman Malik
Christian Ibarola	singer		Bjarne Brøndbo
