= Norske Talenter =

Norwegian TV show

- Created by: Simon Cowell
- Presented by: Solveig Kloppen (2012–); Marte Stokstad (2008); John Brungot (2010–2011); Sturla Berg-Johansen (2008–2009); Pia Lykke (2008); Marthe Sveberg Bjørstad (2010–2011); Stian Blipp (2012)
- Judges: Mia Gundersen (2008–); Bjarne Brøndbo (2015–); Janne Formoe (2017–); Mona Berntsen (2017–); Linn Skåber (2015–2017); Suleman Malik (2015–2017); Alex Rosén (2010–2012); Adil Khan (2011–2012); Jan Fredrik Karlsen (2008–2009); Thomas Giertsen (2008–2010); Lisa Tønne (2014); Omer Bhatti (2014); Bjarte Hjelmeland (2014); Matoma (2025)
- Country of origin: Norway
- No. of seasons: 10

Production
- Production locations: Oslo, Bergen, Stavanger and Trondheim (auditions); Oslo (finals)
- Running time: Varies
- Production companies: Monster Media; Fremantle

Original release
- Network: TV 2
- Release: 22 February 2008 – present

Norske Talenter (English: Norway’s Got Talent, lit. Norwegian Talents) is a Norwegian talent show with a similar format to Britain's Got Talent, making it one of the Got Talent franchise programmes. The 16-year-old singer Erlend Bratland won the first series and Quick Style, a hip hop dance group, won the second series. The judges were music producer Jan Fredrik Karlsen, singer and actress Mia Gundersen and comedian/actor Thomas Giertsen. In 2008 Marte Stokstad and Sturla Berg-Johansen were hosts, and in 2009, Pia Lykke joined Berg-Johansen to be hosts.

For a list of acts that have performed on the show, see List of Norske Talenter acts.

== Series summary ==
Series	Year	1st place	2nd place	3rd place	Hosts	Judges
1	2008	Erlend Bratland (singer)	Vegard Dommersnes (hoop)	Nora Foss al-Jabri (singer)	Marte Stokstad; Sturla Berg-Johansen	Jan Fredrik Karlsen; Mia Gundersen; Thomas Giertsen
2	2009	Quick Style (dancers)	Lydia Hoen Tjore (opera)	Brian Aksnes Hoseth (magician)	Pia Lykke; Sturla Berg-Johansen	Jan Fredrik Karlsen; Mia Gundersen; Thomas Giertsen
3	2010	Kristian Rønning (rapper)			John Brungot; Marthe Sveberg Bjørstad	Alex Rosén; Mia Gundersen; Thomas Giertsen
4	2011	Daniel J. Elmrhari (dancer)			John Brungot; Marthe Sveberg Bjørstad	Alex Rosén; Mia Gundersen; Adil Khan
5	2012	Stine Hole Ulla (singer)	Anders Jektvik (singer-songwriter)		Solveig Kloppen; Stian Blipp Glopholm	Alex Rosén; Mia Gundersen; Adil Khan
6	2014	Angelina Jordan (singer)	Daniel Grindeland (dancer) and Juice Crew (dancers) [order not specified]		Solveig Kloppen	Lisa Tønne; Mia Gundersen; Omer Bhatti; Bjarte Hjelmeland
7	2015	Odin Landbakk (guitarist)	Patrick Jørgensen (rapper)	Slogmåkane (band)	Solveig Kloppen	Linn Skåber; Suleman Malik; Bjarne Brøndbo; Mia Gundersen
8	2017	Vilde Winge (sign language interpreter)	Gemini Crew (dancers)	Mathias Rugsveen (accordionist)	Solveig Kloppen	Linn Skåber; Suleman Malik; Bjarne Brøndbo; Mia Gundersen
9	2018	Tuva Lutro (singer)	Bergen shantykor (singers)	Vetle Hoslemo (singer)	Solveig Kloppen	Mia Gundersen; Mona Berntsen; Bjarne Brøndbo; Janne Formoe

=== Series 1 (2008) ===
In the show's first series, 40 acts competed in the semifinals and 10 acts in the final. The winner was 16-year-old singer Erlend Bratland, with 8-year-old hula hoop artist Vegard F. Dommersnes as the runner-up and 12-year-old singer Nora Foss al-Jabri in third place.

=== Series 2 (2009) ===
In the second series, 32 acts competed in the semifinals and 9 acts in the final: two from each of the four regular semifinal episodes and one from a special semifinal called the "Extra Chance". The acts who competed in the Extra Chance semifinal were selected by the judges from among all of the acts who would otherwise have been eliminated from the competition (from the auditions or semifinals). A public vote determined which act would pass through to the final. That contestant was 14-year-old classical singer Lydia Hoen Tjore, who later placed second overall. The winning act was the hip-hop dance group Quick Style, aged 17 to 18. Six-year-old magician Brian Aksnes Hoseth placed third.

=== Series 3 (2010) ===
The third series aired from March 2010 to late May 2010. Both Thomas Giertsen and Mia Gundersen returned as judges, but Jan Fredrik Karlsen did not and was replaced by Alex Rosen. In the end, 23-year-old rapper Kristian Rønning, known as "Sirius", won the first prize of 500,000 NOK.

=== Series 4 (2011) ===
The fourth series introduced a new judge, Adil Khan, who joined returning judges Mia Gundersen and Alex Rosen. The first prize was again 500,000 NOK, won by 11-year-old dancer Daniel Johansen Elmhari, described by judge Adil as being "as good as Michael Jackson."

=== Series 5 (2012) ===
The fifth series was won by 17-year-old singer Stine Hole Ulla. Singer-songwriter Anders Jektvik was runner-up. The series was watched by an average of 545,000 viewers per episode, with a 32.8 percent share; the final episode attracted 562,000 viewers.

=== Series 6 (2014) ===
In the sixth series, three new judges, Lisa Tønne, Omer Bhatti, and Bjarte Hjelmeland, joined returning judge Mia Gundersen. The competition was won by 8-year-old singer Angelina Jordan, who had emerged as a favorite of both the judges and the viewing audience even before performing in the semifinals, when video of her audition went viral online and attracted much media attention in Norway and around the world. She garnered 46% of the audience vote in the final field of 10 acts, becoming the show's youngest winner. The second and third place acts were solo dancer Daniel Grindeland and the dancing ensemble Juice Crew, although the order in which they placed was not specified. Broadcast from 17 January to 23 May 2014, the series had an average of 644,000 viewers and 39.7% share, with 1,033,000 viewers watching the final episode—a sharp increase from the previous series.

=== Series 7 (2015) ===
The seventh series aired from 18 August 2015 to 27 November 2015. Three new judges, Bjarne Brøndbo, Suleman Malik and Linn Skåber, joined returning judge Mia Gundersen. Solveig Kloppen also returned as host. This series was the first to feature a "golden buzzer" in the auditions, which sent an act straight through to the live shows. Each judge could only use it once. The final winner was 13-year-old guitarist Odin Landbakk. Rapper Patrick Jørgensen was runner-up with singing group Slogmåkane in third place.

=== Series 8 (2017) ===
The eighth series held initial auditions on 19 September 2016, and was broadcast in early 2017. Twelve acts competed in the final. The winner was 14-year-old sign language interpreter Vilde Winge. Dance duo Gemini Crew (both 18 years old) were runner-up with 13-year-old accordion player Mathias Rugsveen in third place.

=== Series 9 (2018) ===
The ninth series held initial auditions on 19 September 2017, and was broadcast in early 2018. Twelve acts competed in the final. The winner was 12-year-old singer Tuva Lutro, with singing ensemble Bergen shantykor (Bergen shanty choir) placing second and singer Vetle Hoslemo third.

=== Series 10 (2019) ===
The tenth series was broadcast in late 2019. Ten acts competed in the final. The winner was 18-year-old twirler Amalie Skeide Sandvik. The runners-up were 16-year-old violinist Rebecca Nørstrud Isaksen and the Fredrikstad Children's and Youth Theater, a large musical-theater ensemble.

== Awards and nominations ==
Year	Organization	Category	Result	Ref.
2008	Gullruten	Best Entertainment Show	Nominated	
2017	Gullruten	Best Entertainment Show	Nominated	
