= Kaja Norum =

Norwegian model and figurativist painter (born 1989)

- Born: April 17, 1989 (age 36); Lørenskog, Norway
- Known for: Painting, modeling

Kaja Norum (born April 17, 1989) is a Norwegian model and figurativist painter. A former student and protégé of painter Odd Nerdrum, Norum is devoted to Nerdrum's philosophy of Kitsch painting, and is a part of The Kitsch Movement spawned by Nerdrum. After the latter relocated to France in 2011, Norum is the primary caretaker of his gallery and his estate.

== Early life and education ==
Born in Lørenskog. Norum graduated from the Lørenskog Waldorf School in 2005. From there she went to the Oslo Waldorf School graduating in 2008. Norum then relocated to Stavern in order to study under kitsch painter Odd Nerdrum at his seaside gallery.

== Career ==
=== Painting ===
After studying under Nerdrum in Stavern for three years, Norum debuted with her own exhibition in June 2011. The exhibition, which consisted of figurative artworks turned out to be a success with the majority of the artworks being sold on the opening day. It attracted large attention with the most famous painting depicting comedian Sturla Berg-Johansen with an erect penis. The painting, "Homo ludens" valued at US$14.500, was sold to an anonymous buyer. It was speculated that the buyer was either hotel tycoon Petter Stordalen or business magnate Stein Erik Hagen, however it was later revealed that it was actually a gourmet restaurant in Oslo that had made the purchase. In August 2012 Norum opened her second exhibition, at the Gallery Soon in Son in Vestby.

=== Modeling ===
Norum has done modeling for the magazines Det Nye and Alfa. In January 2013 she appeared in the magazine Kamille doing nude photos.
