= Anders Jektvik =

Norwegian musician, singer, songwriter and guitarist

Anders Jektvik (born in Hitra Municipality, Norway on 14 June 1982) is a Norwegian musician, singer, songwriter and guitarist.

He started in the formation Tefeilles as a guitar player. Their debut album was To hjærta. He left the band and continued his career as a solo artist. On 1 February 2013, he released his debut solo album entitled Aill kjeinne aill.

In live performances, he is accompanied by fellow musicians under the name Anders Jektvik Trio, made up of Anders Jektvik (vocals, guitar), Aril Reiersen (bass, backing vocals) and Dan Åke Clausen (drums, backing vocals)

== Norske Talenter ==
As a singer, he took part in the fifth season of the Norwegian reality television contest show Norske Talenter singing his own compositions including "Bare saind" and "Tøv". In the live final broadcast in December 2012, he finished runner-up with the title going to singer Stine Hole Ulla.

== Discography ==
=== Albums ===
as part of Tefeilles

- 2007: To hjærta

Solo

Year	Album	Peak positions	Certification
Year	Album	NOR	Certification
2013	Aill kjeinne aill	4	
2014	No som ailt e bra	12	
