= D.D.E. (band) =

Norwegian band

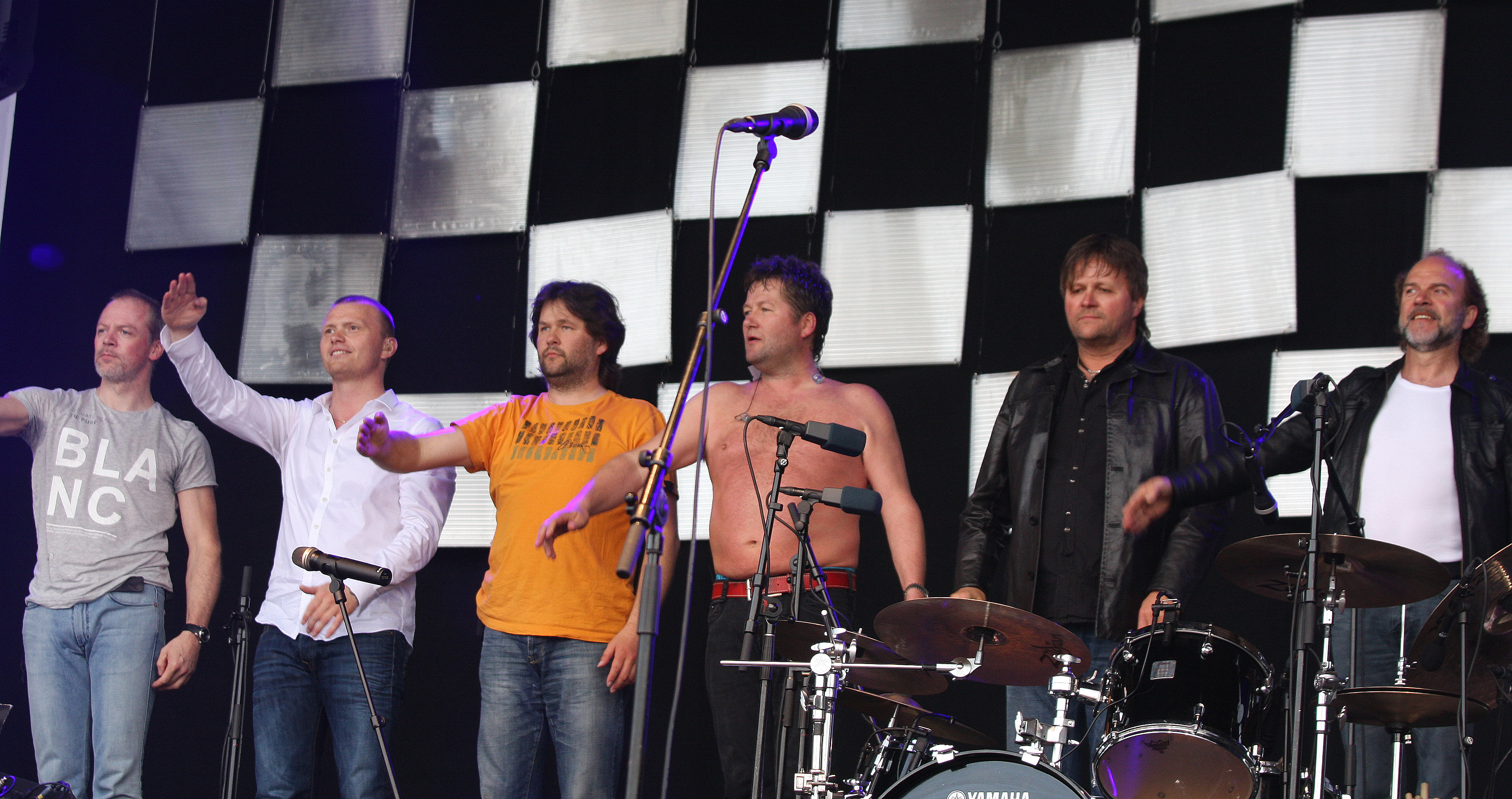
- D.D.E. in Sandnes 2009

Background information
- Origin: Namsos, Norway
- Genres: Trønderrock
- Years active: 1992–present
- Labels: Sony Music Entertainment
- Members: Bjarne Brøndbo; Arnt Egil Rånes; Eivind Berre; Bård Jørgen Iversen; Eskil Brøndbo; Daniel Viken
- Past members: Terje Tranaas; Frode Viken
- Website: Official website

D.D.E. is a Norwegian pop/rock group founded in Namsos in 1992. The members were previously in a band called After Dark.

== Biography ==
D.D.E. is a Norwegian pop/rock band that was formed in the small town of Namsos in 1992.

D.D.E.'s music is heavily influenced by traditional Norwegian folk music and rock. The band has released over 15 albums since their debut in 1992, with their most popular songs including "E6", "Rai Rai" and "Det går likar no".

D.D.E. has won several awards throughout their career, including the Spellemannprisen (Norwegian Grammy) for best group in 1998 and 2000, and they have also been nominated for the award numerous times. The band has also been recognized for their contributions to Norwegian culture and music, and in 2016 they were awarded the prestigious King's Medal of Merit.

D.D.E. continues to tour and perform throughout Norway.

== Band members ==
Current members

- Bjarne Brøndbo - Lead vocals, accordion (1992–present)
- Daniel Viken - Guitar, backing vocals (2018–present)
- Arnt Egil Rånes - Guitar, backing vocals (1992–present)
- Eivind Berre - Bass, backing vocals (1992–present)
- Bård Jørgen Iversen - Keyboards, accordion, backing vocals (1992–present)
- Eskil Brøndbo - Drums, percussion (1992–present)

Former members

- Terje Tranaas - Keyboards, accordion, backing vocals (1992–2002)
- Frode Viken - Guitar, mandolin, backing vocals (1992-2018; died 2018)

== Discography ==
=== Studio albums ===
- Rai-Rai - 1993
- Rai 2 - 1994
- Det E D.D.E. - 1995
- Det Går Likar No - 1996
- Ohwææææh!!! - 1998
- No E D.D.E. Jul Igjen! - 1999
- Jippi - 2000
- Vi Ska Fæst - Aill' Mot Aill' - 2001
- Vi e konga - 2003
- Næ næ næ næ næ næ - 2005
- No Går Det Så Det Suse - 2008
- Frelsesarmeens Juleplate - 2008
- Ut av kontroll - med sola i auan - 2009
- Energi - 2012

=== Live Albums ===
- 15 år (Live) - 2007
- By'n vi bor i - all de fine sangan - 2014 (Separate deluxe edition released)

=== Singles & Ep's ===
- Lykka Kjem Itj Rækans På Ei Fjøl - 2005
- No Går Det Så Det Suse' - 2007
- Du Vekke Dyret . 2007
- Energi - 2012
- Æ va aldri der - 2012
- Ingen verdens ting - 2012
- Damer i solnedgangen - 2014
- Sleike sine sår - 2015
- Nabo'n min - 2017
- La det gro - 2019
- TATTA TE TU - 2019
- SÅ MANGE MIL, SÅ MANGE ÅR - 2021

=== Compilations ===
- Her bli det liv de beste [1992-2002] (2002).
- EMI gull (2004)
