= Rune Brøndbo =

Norwegian jazz musician and composer

- Also known as: Sternklang
- Born: 2 March 1968 (age 57); Norway
- Genres: Jazz, electronica
- Occupation(s): Musician, composer
- Instrument(s): Keyboard, guitar, vocals
- Labels: Jazzland, Beatservice, dBut, Sonne Disk
- Website: www.wibutee.net

Rune "Sternklang" Brøndbo (born 2 March 1968 in Norway) is a Norwegian jazz musician (keyboards, guitar) and composer, known for recording with various notable bands including Wibutee and Sternklang. He is the cousin of the DDE drummer Eskil Brøndbo and vocalist Bjarne Brøndbo

== Career ==
Brøndbo has made himself noticed with his band Sternklang releasing four records within a decade (1997–2006). He also contributes on the two latest albums of Wibutee, Playmachine (2004) and Sweet Mental (2006), with whom he performed at Nattjazz in Bergen (2003 and 2006), the last time featuring Anja Garbarek.

== Discography ==
=== Solo works ===
As Sternklang

- 1997: Freestylespacefunk (Beatservice Records)
- 1999: Neolounge (Beatservice Records)
- 2002: My Time Is Yours (dBut)
- 2006: Transistor Beach (dBut)

=== Collaborative works ===
Within Rotoscope

- 2001: Great Curves (Jester Records)

Within Wibutee

- 2004: Playmachine (Jazzland)
- 2006: Sweet Mental (Sonne Disk)
