= Omer Bhatti =

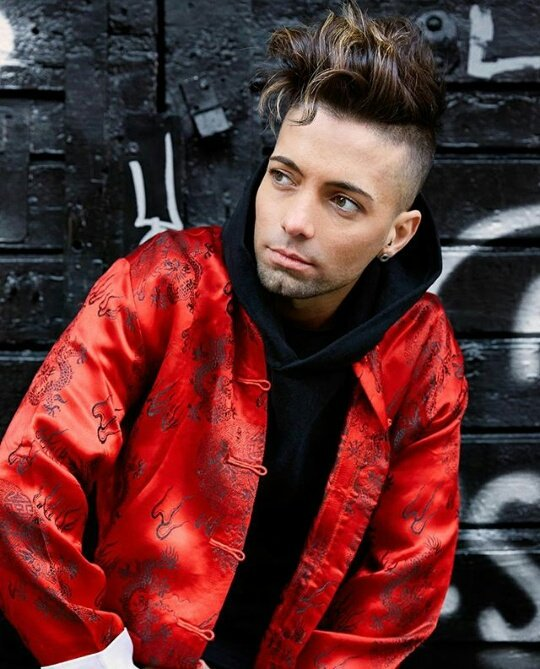

Background information
- Also known as: O-Bee
- Born: Omer Michael Jamal Bhatti; 14 June 1985 (age 41); Oslo, Norway
- Genres: Rap, hip hop, RnB
- Occupations: Singer, rapper, dancer, writer
- Website: OMER on Facebook

Omer Michael Jamal Bhatti (born 14 June 1985), better known by his stage name O-Bee, is a Norwegian rapper and dancer, also known for his association with Michael Jackson. In 2014, he served as a judge on the sixth series of Norske Talenter (Norway's edition of the Got Talent franchise).

== Background ==
Omer Bhatti was born in Drammen, Norway, and grew up in Holmlia. He is the youngest child of a Pakistani father and a Norwegian mother. He has an older sister named Shaista Bhatti.

== Career ==
In early 2011 he signed a deal with Universal and released the single "All Around the World", launching in 67 countries. The song features singer Genevieve Jackson, the daughter of Michael Jackson's youngest brother, Steven Randy Jackson. In this regard, he was a guest on the TV show Skavlan. He also released the single "Life Is a Movie" with his first official music video, directed by Kavar Singh, in August 2011.

Speaking about this in a 2012 interview with Luka Neskovic, Bhatti said that "Life Is a Movie" is dedicated to his friend and mentor, Michael Jackson. "When I look at it now it's definitely the song that I'm happy with, and the video," he stated. "But at that point in my life, what happened three years ago, was very sensitive to me. I make music of what I'm experiencing at that point of my life, my emotions are written there. Those emotions were still so strong. 'Life is a movie' is actually the first song that I wrote after what happened, you know, after he passed."

In September 2012 he released a music video for the single "See the Light" with singer Shontelle.

He joined the judging panel for the Norwegian talent show Norske Talenter in 2013.

In early 2014 he released a dance video entitled "Cold As Ice" along with the Norwegian drummer Hazzo. In May 2014 he released the single "Love You in the Morning". The song's chorus is sung by David Amaro, O-Bee's childhood friend. In July of the same year, O-Bee went on tour for VG-lista Topp 20. He and his team consisting of A-Tee (Deejay), Juice Crew (dance group) and David Amaro, performed in 5 cities in Norway. On 29 May 2015, Bhatti released the single "Let Me Know", featuring David Amaro.

== Discography ==
=== Singles ===
- "All Around the World" (2011) featuring Genevieve Jackson
- "Life is a Movie" (2011)
- "See the Light" (2012) featuring Shontelle
- "Love You in the Morning" (2014)
- "Let Me Know" (2015)
- "Automatic" (2016)

=== Other releases ===
- "Red Nikes"
- "Under Pressure" with Jae-R
- "A Toast" with Jae-R and Chris Tucker
- "Wanna Be Startin' Something"
- "Fresh" (2010)
- "Jump" (2016)
- "The Come Up"
