= Norske Talenter series 3 =

Season 3 of Norske Talenter premiered on March 5, 2010, with auditions. They auditioned in Bergen, Oslo and Trondheim, and picked out 40 semifinalists.

The season was won by 23-year old rapper Kristian Rønning.

== Judges ==
- Alex Rosén
- Mia Gundersen
- Thomas Giertsen

== Hosts ==
- John Brungot
- Marthe Sveberg

== finals ==
=== Semifinal 1 ===
Order	Finished	Artist	Act	Buzzes and judges choices		
Order	Finished	Artist	Act	Rosén	Gundersen	Giertsen
1	Unknown	The Vibe Team	Hip-hop dance group			
2	Unknown	Maria and Julie	Violinists			
3	Unknown	Ståle Dammen Ek	Yoyo-artist			
4	3rd (lost judges' vote)	Matilda Marie Gressberg	Singer			✔
5	Unknown	Bubble Boyz	Comedy act		X	
6	Unknown	Inoka Skjønhaug	Acrobat			
7	Unknown	Nick Malte Strøm	Rapper			
8	2nd (won judges' vote)	Alexx Alexxander	Illusionist	✔	✔	
9	Unknown	Team Hybridmovez	Tricking group			
10	1st (won public vote)	Knut Yrwin	Electric boogie dancer			

=== dominic 2 ===
Order	Finished	Artist	Act	Buzzes and judges choices		
Order	Finished	Artist	Act	Rosén	Gundersen	Giertsen
1	Unknown	Gard Emil and Niels Ovlla	Samí drumming duo			
2	Unknown	Veronica Ljosnes	Tissue artist			
3	2nd (won judges' vote)	Ludvik Haug	Michael Jackson dancer	✔		✔
4	Unknown	Emilie Omland Grimstad	Singer			
5	Unknown	Mini Tribe and Press Play	Afro fusion dance group			
6	Unknown	Klaus Andersen	Backwards show			
7	3rd (lost judges' vote)	Elisabeth Elstad Olsen	Singer		✔	
8	Unknown	Celtic Inspiration Dance Company	Irish dancers			
9	1st (won public vote)	Arnfinn Baar	Electric boogie dancer			
10	Unknown	Julio Gonzalez	Flame artist			X

=== Semifinal 3 ===
Order	Finished	Artist	Act	Buzzes and judges choices		
Order	Finished	Artist	Act	Rosén	Gundersen	Giertsen
1	Unknown	Leila Vurucu	Bellydancer			
2	Unknown	Rebecca Ødegård	Singer			
3	Unknown	Magnus Myklebust	Diablo artist			
4	2nd (won judges' vote)	Floorknights	Breakdance group		✔	✔
5	Unknown	Åsmund Jenssen	Violinist			
6	Unknown	Olav Antonsen	Wood cutter			
7	3rd (lost judges' vote)	Simen Almås	Popping dancer	✔		
8	Unknown	Live Recording featuring Tor T	Singers			
9	1st (won public vote	Kristian Rønning	Rapper			
10	Unknown	Les Femmes	Burlesque singers			

=== Semifinal 4 ===
Order	Finished	Artist	Act	Buzzes and judges choices		
Order	Finished	Artist	Act	Rosén	Mia	Giertsen
1	Unknown	Anne Christina Olaussen	Violinist			
2	1st (won public' vote)	Erik Morten Stenersen	Ventriloquist			
3	Unknown	Camilla	Ballet dancer			
4	Unknown	Strutsejentene	Comedy act			
5	Unknown	Johan Lyche	Impressionist			
6	3rd (lost judges' vote)	Kangaroos	Basketball-gymnasts	✔		
7	Unknown	Malin and Hege	Pole dancers			
8	Unknown	Thea Paulsrud	Singer			
9	Unknown	Tabanka Crew	Dancehall/African dance group			
10	2nd (won judges' vote)	Trude Emanuelsen	Singer		✔	✔

== Final ==
Order	Finished	Artist	Act
1	Unknown	Elisabeth Olsen	Singer
2	Unknown	Ludvik Haug	Michael Jackson dancer
3	Unknown	Trude Emanuelsen	Singer
4	Unknown	Knut Yrwin	Electric boogie dancer
5	Unknown	Alexx Alexxander	Illusionist
6	Unknown	Arnfinn Baar	Electric boogie dancer
7	Unknown	Erik Morten Stenersen	Ventriloquist
8	1st (winner)	Kristian Rønning	Rapper
9	Unknown	Floorknights	Breakdance group
