= Frikar Dance Company =

Norwegian dance company

FRIKAR dance company (established May 2006 by Hallgrim Hansegård) is a Norwegian dance company for contemporary and traditional dance specializing in the connection between dance and nature.

== History ==
FRIKAR dance company was founded by choreographer Hallgrim Hansegård in 2006, and has toured 29 countries all over the world. The company is described by National Geographic as "wildly inventive" and is composed by 32 artists from 4 continents (India, Iran, Somalia, Brazil, Cape Verde, France, Sweden, Norway.) The artists from very diverse genres meet each other in the research of gravity and human nature.

With a background in Norwegian traditional dance choreographer Hallgrim Hansegård founded FRIKAR dance company to give acrobatic dancers living in Norway a creative environment. Together with the dancers he has been developing a new choreographical style for contemporary dance called "Down2Earth" including Hallingdans Capoeira and break dance. He works in the formats of aerial dance, site specific ecosophical stage arts, indoor dance and interdisciplinary arts.

Hansegård made his international breakthrough with an animation film at the Venice Biennale in 2003 (Tarantrance). In 2005 he won 3rd prize at Superdok. In 2007 he was awarded "Artist of the Year" at The Norwegian Folk Music Awards. In 2009 he won the "Award for best choreography" at the Eurovision Song Contest 2009, among 43 countries in the most seen entertainment TV program in the world.

In 2010 he premiered "Jamsiis" at Bergen International Festival. This was a highly personal contribution to the Nordic contemporary dance scene, based on his roots in traditional dances. Jamsiis opened up a public discussion about the boundaries of contemporary dance in Norway. NRK (the Norwegian Broadcasting) writes:

JAMSIIS, Hallgrim Hansegårds new production, is the most exciting I have seen here. It’s very exciting to see traditional dance in dialogue with contemporary dance. Hansegård is branching out and opening up new territory here. He has come down a path that I think is very important to go. That Hansegård is a dancer with strong will to do his own thing and blessedly uninhibited as far as exceeding boundaries is concerned is something the Norwegian dance community should be happy about… At the same time that he approaches contemporary dance, he opens doors. If he succeeds in making contemporary dance accessible to a wider audience than today’s, the genre of contemporary dance should learn to endure a ‘halling-roundkick’ or two.

In 2009 Hansegård directed TidarÅ, an outdoor full night dance performance under a waterfall with 22 dancers and musicians from FRIKAR dance company. The production collected contemporary and traditional dancers in a research for a unique contemporary dance technique. "Tidarå" is part of FRIKARs ecosophical productions. Hansegård directed also Yr in 2009 together with violin virtuoso Ragnhild Hemsing, premiere at the Bergen International Festival.

In 2008 FRIKAR was censored by the Roman Catholic Church in Naples for his non-conventional interpretation of Peer Gynt. In the years 2005 to 2007 Hansegård directed "Undergrunnsfargo", "Isolations", "Laus", "Kruk", "The snuff grinders" and "Bastard".

He also participated in Dansefeber, the Norwegian version of So You Think You Can Dance, in 2006. In 2008, his dancing was digitalized for the massively multiplayer online role-playing game (MMORPG) Age of Conan: Hyborian Adventures.

== Choreographies / productions ==
- "AP" (2010)
- "JAMSIIS" (2010)
- "Wall dance" (2010)
- "TidarÅ" (2009)
- "YR" (2009)
- "Fairytale" (2009)
- "Mjølk" (2009"
- "Bukkerittet" (2008)
- "THE SNUFF GRINDERS" (2007)
- "KRUK!" (2007)
- "Bastard" (2007)
- "LAUS" (2006)

== TV appearances ==
The whole company made it to the finals in Norway's Got Talent in 2008. Frikar performed with winner Alexander Rybak at the Eurovision Song Contest 2009 (ESC) performing "Fairytale". The routine, based on traditional halling and choreographed by Hallgrim Hansegård, was awarded the Best Choreography of Eurovision 2009 by esctoday.com. In 2009 Frikar performed 150 times, including its outdoor big scale production TidarÅ, concerts with the Oslo Philharmonic Orchestra, the premiere "YR" at Bergen International Art Festival. They toured 20 European countries with live performances and TV shows. FRIKAR was censored by the Catholic Church on their 2008 Italy tour for an unromanticized interpretation of Peer Gynt. Frikar also won the "Norway's got talent" competition in 2008.
