= Lisa Tønne =

Norwegian standup comedian (born 1977)

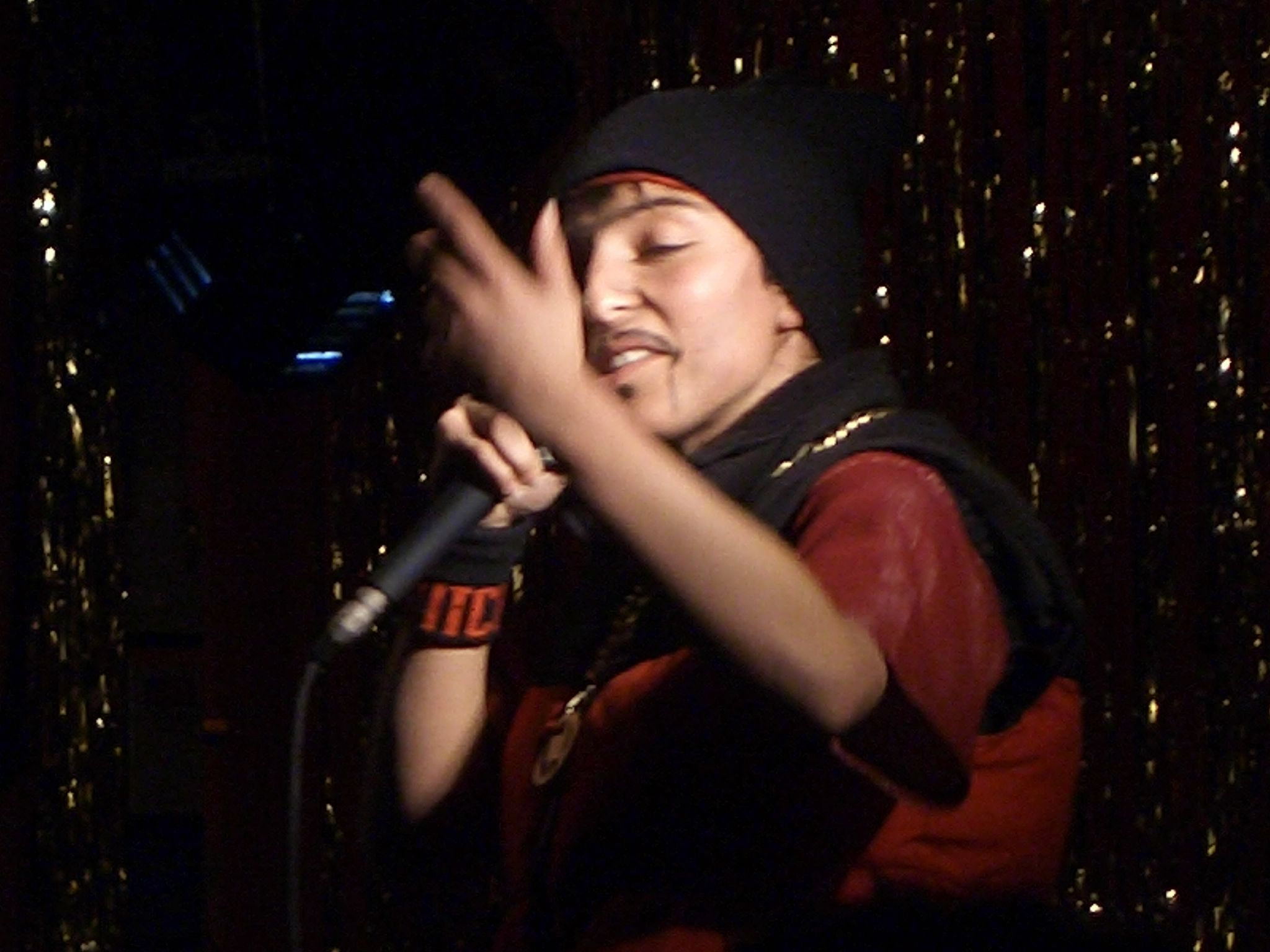
- Lisa Tønne as the character "Ali Reza"
- Born: Forozan Sadogi Nazer (فروزان صادقی ناصر); 21 December 1977 (age 48); Tehran, Iran
- Occupations: Comedian, actress
- Years active: 1999 – present
- Spouse: Kyrre Holm Johannessen (2007 – present)
- Website: http://www.standup.no/artist/index.php?artistID=46

Lisa Foruzan Tønne (Persian: فروزان) (born 21 December 1977) is an Iranian stand-up comedian and actress.

In 2002 she won the Best New Artist award at the Norwegian Comedy Awards. She has also been an actor and presenter on television, and from 2004 to 2007 played the part of "Solfrid" in the situation comedy Seks som oss. She was a judge on Series 6 of Norske_Talenter.

Tønne married the television presenter Kyrre Holm Johannessen in 2007, and in December 2008 she had her first child, a boy.
