= Trønder rock =

Rock music developed in Trøndelag, Norway

- Native name: Trønderrock
- Stylistic origins: Rock and roll; folk rock; school band
- Cultural origins: Early 1970s Trøndelag, Norway
- Typical instruments: Guitar (acoustic; electric; bass); drums; keyboard; accordion

Regional scenes
- Sør-Trøndelag; Nord-Trøndelag

Local scenes
- Namsos; Trondheim; Steinkjer; etc.

Trønder rock (Norwegian: trønderrock) is a music and cultural scene developed in the Trøndelag region of Norway in the early 1970s, in which bands and artists merged folk rock inspired rock and roll with cultural characteristics.

The term was coined by journalist Bertil Lien in 1972, and has been described by Professor of Music Studies Ole Kai Ledang as "rock music with trøndersk tone" (Norwegian: "rockemusikk med trøndersk tonefall"). However, the term also often includes bands that sing in English, especially Prudence. In the book Trønderrock from 1982, authors Gunnar Sand and Nils Toldnes also emphasize the band Prudence and the solo career of the members Terje Tysland and Åge Aleksandersen, but also Hans Rotmo and his band Vømmøl Spellmannslag, Arbeidslaget hass K. Vømmølbakken and Heimevernslaget, which are more characterized by Norwegian folk music.

Today, the term has gained some further use, and is often used as a general term for artists and bands associated with Trøndelag.

== Literature ==
- Gunnar Sand og Nils Toldnes (1982). Trønderrock. Pax. ISBN 8253012438.
- Kaare Skevik (2005). Drunk and happy: Historien om Prudence og trønderrocken. LagForlaget. ISBN 9788299642019.
- Per Kristian Olsen, Asbjørn Bakke, Sigrid Hvidsten (2009). Norsk rocks historie: Fra Rocke-Pelle til Hank von Helvete. Cappelen Damm. ISBN 9788204114068.
