= Nora Foss al-Jabri =

Norwegian singer (born 1996)

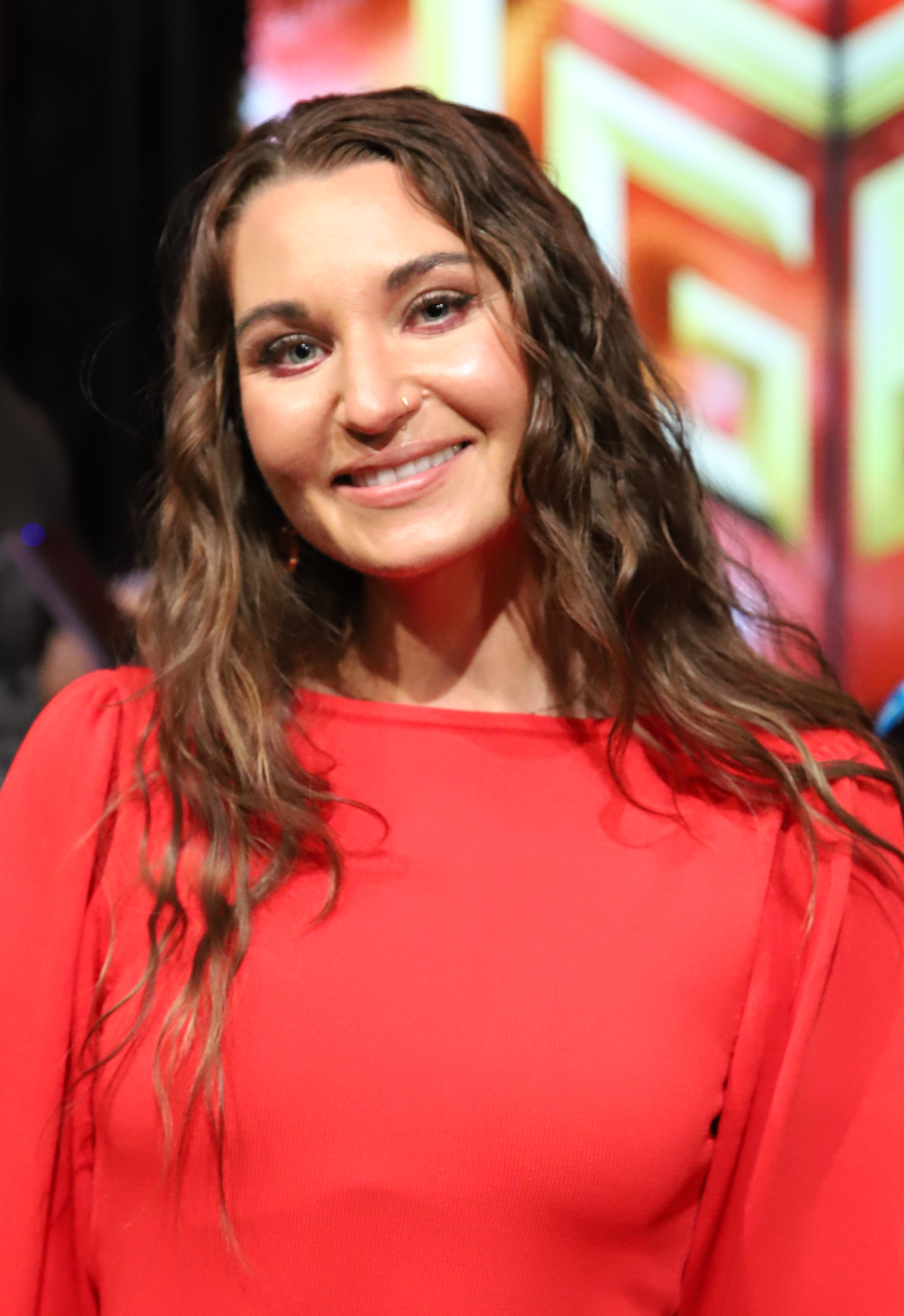
- Nora Al-Jabri in January 2025

Background information
- Born: Nora Foss Al-Jabri; 29 January 1996 (age 30); Gjøvik, Norway
- Genres: Pop
- Occupation: singer
- Years active: 2007–present

Nora Foss al-Jabri (Arabic: نورا فوز الجابري) (born 29 January 1996) is a Norwegian singer.

== Early life ==
She was born to an Iraqi father and a Norwegian mother in Gjøvik, Norway. She started singing when she was eight years old and took singing lessons regularly.

== Career ==
She became known in Norway because of her version of Leonard Cohen's "Hallelujah". At first it got some radio play but the big success came after her sister posted a video in a singing contest on the Norwegian video site "snutter10". The video became popular, getting her more attention. She has since appeared on numerous television shows and concerts.

She also sang three songs on Norwegian children's music band Lyriaka's album called Lyriaka i jungelen.

She participated in the talent show Norske Talenter in 2008. After she sang "Somewhere Over the Rainbow", the judges described her as a talented and technically skilled singer, who sounded older than her age. She finished third in the competition.

As a result, on 18 May 2009, Nora was featured on Oprah Winfrey's "World's Most Talented Kids" Finale Episode. She sang "Over the Rainbow".

She took part in 2012 Melodi Grand Prix in a bid to represent Norway in the 2012 Eurovision Song Contest in Baku with the song "Somewhere Beautiful". She finished in 2nd place.

She took part in Melodi Grand Prix 2025 in February 2025, with the song "Sulale". She finished in 6th place.

== Discography ==
=== Albums ===
- 2011: Nora Foss al-Jabri

=== Singles ===
- 2012: "Somewhere Beautiful"
