= Eskil Brøndbo =

Norwegian musician

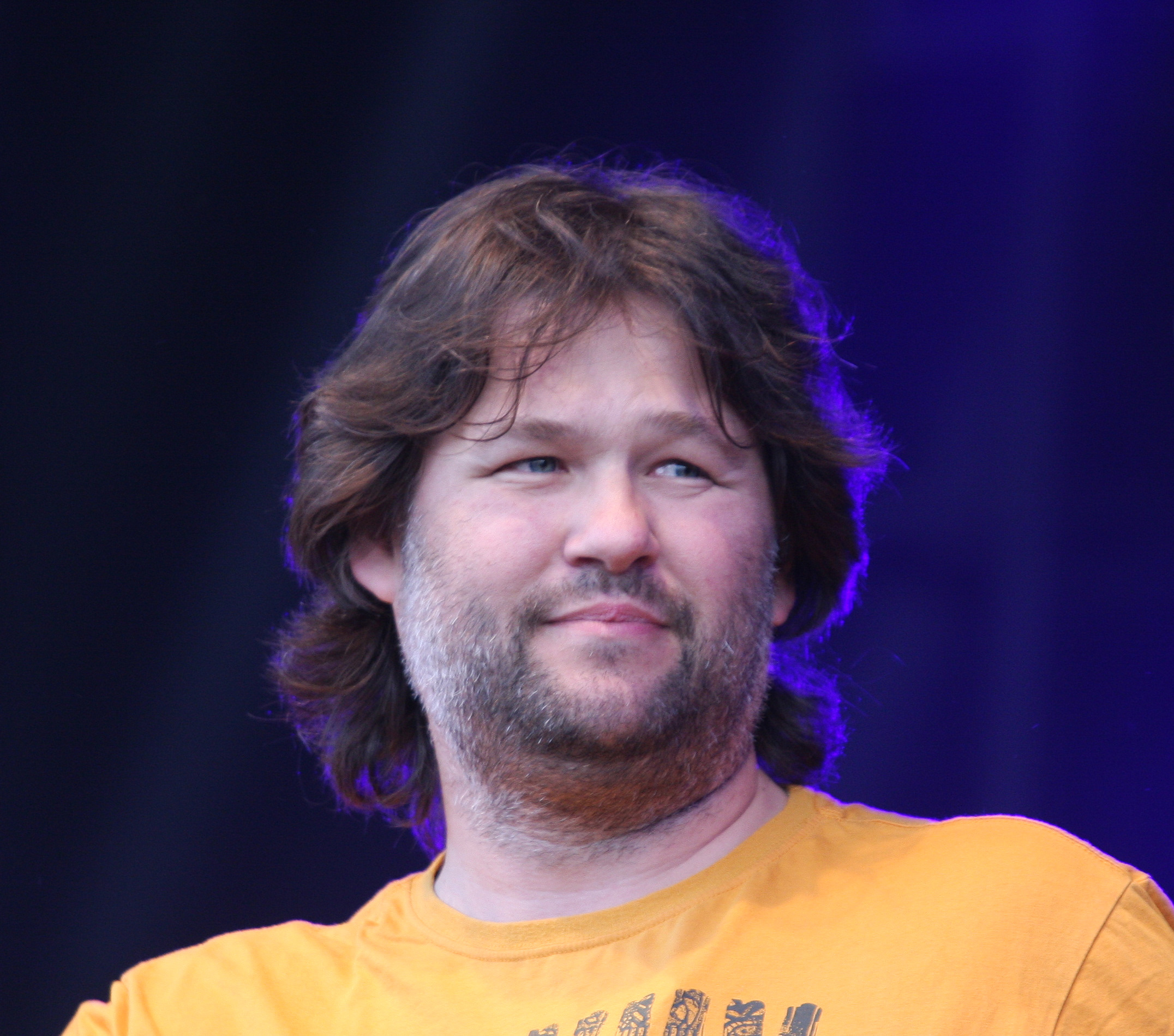
Eskil Brøndbo in Sandnes 2009

Eskil Brøndbo (born 26 January 1970 in Namsos) is the drummer in the band D.D.E. where his brother, Bjarne Brøndbo is the vocalist. He is cousin of the Electronica musician Rune "Sternklang" Brøndbo.

From 1985 – 1986 he was the deputy drummer for After Dark, who were the forerunners for D.D.E., but their regular drummer, Knut Håvard Lysberg, left the group. In 1990 Lysberg left and Eskil Brøndbo became the permanent drummer. After Dark changed their name to D.D.E. in 1992 and became the country's best selling band.

Brøndbo is active in local politics. From 2007 he was member of Overhalla council as representing the Norwegian Labor Party, and from 2011 he was the representative and candidate for the Conservatives.

== Discography ==
=== Album ===
- 1993 D.D.E. Rai-Rai (Percussion)
- 1994 D.D.E. Rai 2 (Percussion)
- 1996 D.D.E. Det går likar no (Percussion)
- 1998 D.D.E. OHWÆÆÆÆÆH !!! (Percussion)
- 1999 D.D.E. No e D.D.E. jul igjen (Percussion)
- 2000 D.D.E. Jippi' (Percussion)
- 2001 D.D.E. Vi ska fæst — aill' mot aill' (Percussion)
- 2003 D.D.E. Vi e konga (Percussion)
- 2005 D.D.E. Næ næ næ næ næ næ (Percussion)

=== Live albums/compilations ===
- 1995 D.D.E. Det è D.D.E. (live) (Percussion)
- 2002 D.D.E. Her bli de liv-det beste 1992–2002 (Percussion)
