= Jan Fredrik Karlsen =

Norwegian musical manager

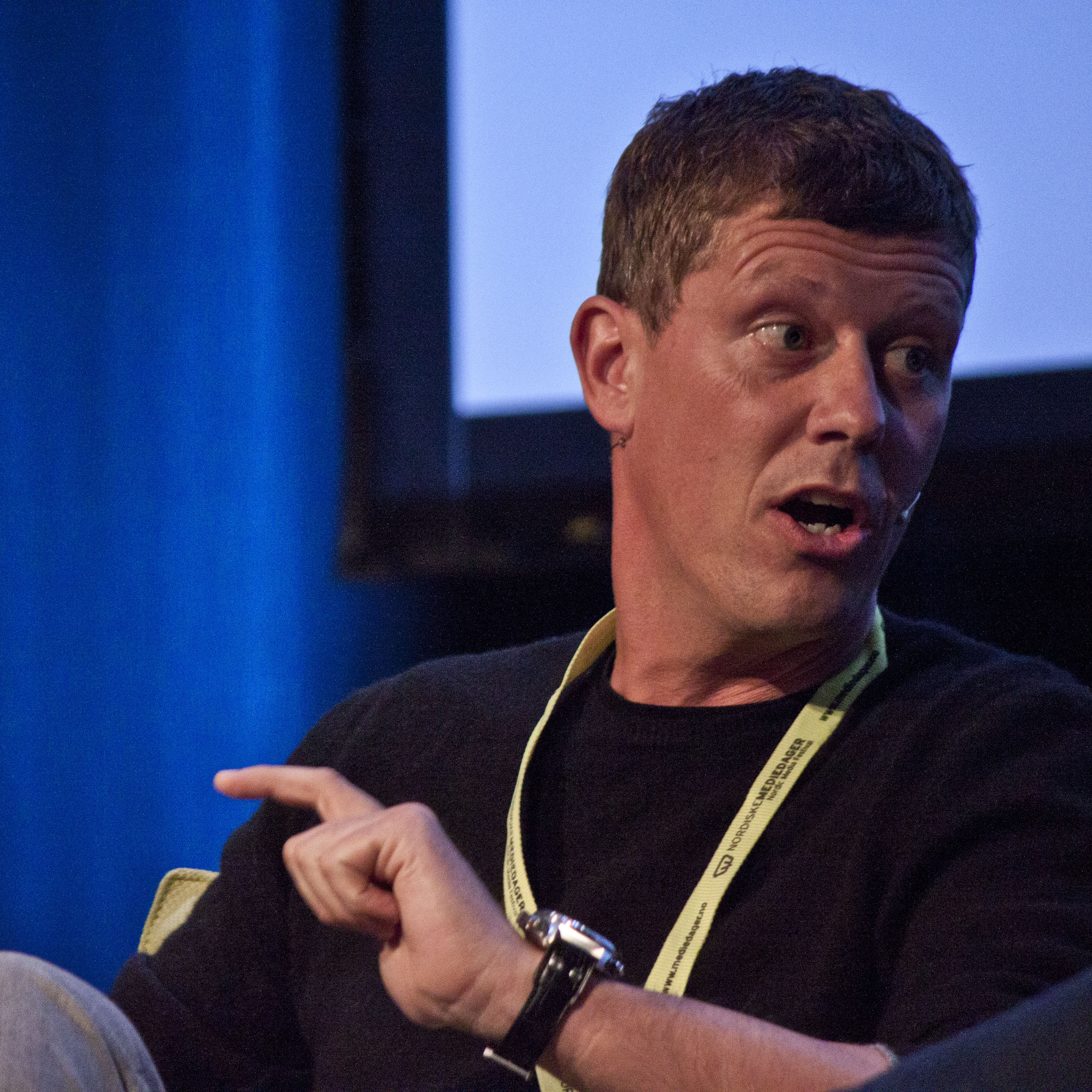
Jan Fredrik Karlsen, 2013

Jan Fredrik Karlsen (born 17 June 1973 in Slemmestad) is a Norwegian artist manager and television personality.

Karlsen has worked in the Norwegian music industry since his late teens working for popular Norwegian comedians/singer/songwriters Herodes Falsk and Tom Mathisen. In his thirties, the music journalists in Norway's third largest newspaper Dagbladet in January 2004 voted him the most powerful man in the Norwegian music industry.

Karlsen is manager of, among others, Kurt Nilsen, who won Norwegian Idol in 2003 and consequently World Idol and Alejandro Fuentes who came in 3rd place in Idol 2005.

Karlsen was a judge in the Norwegian edition of Idol in 2003, 2004 and 2007, and was also one of the judges in the only season of World Idol in 2003. In the spring of 2008 and 2009 he was a judge on television show Norske Talenter (Norway's Got Talent) with Thomas Giertsen and Mia Gundersen. In the autumn of 2009 he was judge of Norwegian X Factor in 2009. He was also chosen for a second season of X Factor in Norway for 2010.

Karlsen also had the television series Lurt av Karlsen (Fooled by Karlsen), where he tricks celebrities in the same style as MTV series Punk'd.

In 2016 and 2017, Karlsen was the music supervisor for the Norwegian pre-selection show Melodi Grand Prix, who determines the country's representative for the international Eurovision Song Contest.
