= Sturla Berg-Johansen =

Norwegian actor and comedian

- Born: 5 September 1967; Tønsberg
- Awards: (Gullruten 2008, 2008)

Sturla Berg-Johansen (born 5 September 1967) is a Norwegian stand-up comedian, imitator, actor and television host.

== Career ==
Berg-Johansen grew up in Tønsberg where he started his acting at Tønsberg Amateur Theater. He worked at a traveling agency at the end of the 1980s, and he was, among other things, in charge of entertainment for tourists who traveled between Mallorca and Tenerife. In 1989, he toured in Norway with his own air guitar show, but he first got his break-through with his imitations of Leif Juster under Dan Børge Akerø's revue competition on TV 2 in 1992. After that he had several guest appearances on Norwegian television, as well as one-man shows in restaurants, bars, theaters and for business-firms. He often had minor acting jobs in Tønsberg.

Besides his several stand-up shows, Berg-Johansen was the host of a children's TV breakfast show on TV 2 and for the entertainment shows Tre Fluer and Pictonary on TV Norge. He also had a role as "Dennis" in the TV 2 sit-com Bot og Bedring. In 2002, he won the comedy award on the Norwegian Broadcasting Corporation. The following year, he participated in the comedy program Best uten ball on TV 2. In 2006, he became a host of the game show Deal or No Deal which was shown on the same channel. He also performed in the theater on several occasions, playing in Shakespeare's Macbeth among others.

In the summer of 2007, he performed a song during a show which was hosted by former Bot og Bedring colleague Tommy Steine. From 2008 to 2009, he was a host in Norske Talenter.

In August 2012, Sturla hosted the Norwegian version of the internationally very successful gameshow, called Million Dollar Money Drop for TV2.

== Personal life ==
He has admitted to having been addicted to drugs and alcohol for many years. He has been clean since 2000, but he continues to use his addictions as material for his stand-up shows. He has also held several lectures about preventing drug and alcohol addiction for teenagers, police and health personnel.

He had been known for a long time as a "ladies man", but in February 2009, he came out as gay on the première of his new show Damenes aften.

On 24 October 2019, he confirmed a relationship with the 20-year younger artist, Kaja Norum. In July 2021, the couple married.
