= Erlend Bratland =

Norwegian singer (born 1991)

- Born: Erlend Bratland; 27 October 1991 (age 34); Husnes, Kvinnherad Municipality
- Genres: Pop music
- Occupation: Singer
- Instrument: vocal
- Years active: 2008 –
- Label: daWorks
- Website: www.erlendbratland.no

Erlend Bratland (born 27 October 1991 in Husnes, Kvinnherad Municipality, Norway) is a Norwegian singer. Best known for winning Norske Talenter in 2008, a Norwegian television talent series.

== Biography ==
=== Early life ===
Bratland was born to Kjersti Bratland, a native of Husnes, in 1991. Aged 13, he played the lead role in the musical Oliver together with the local "Blandakor" in Husnes. After this he performed in the musical Chess in neighbouring Bømlo. He also participated in Ungdommens Kulturmønstring (UKM) and made it to the semi-finals.

He moved to Haugesund in his teens to study food and restaurant management, but dropped out during his first year to continue his music career. During his early career, he was easily recognizable for his "emo" style and appearance, but during his musical hiatus, he dropped this look.

=== Norske Talenter ===
In early 2008, Bratland attended the Bergen auditions for Norske Talenter where he, sporting a black Marilyn Manson T-shirt, performed "O Holy Night". He qualified for the main rounds, and soon became a favorite. At the semi-final he sang "Nella Fantasia" as the last contestant, where he won the public vote. In the final, he sang "Lost" by Anouk, again as the final contestant, and won the series with 36% of the votes, ahead of runner-up Vegard F. Dommersnes, an 8-year-old hula hoop artist. After the show ended, he recorded his first single, "Lost", which he had sung in the final round.

Following his win, Bratland took part in the Norwegian Idol tour during the summer of 2008 together with Norwegian Idol winner Glenn Lyse and other contestants from both shows.

On 16 May, two weeks after he won Norske Talenter, his version of "Lost" was made available for download by Telenor. The next week, the single hit No. 4 on VG's single list, hitting No. 1 two weeks later. On 27 October Sony BMG released his debut album True Colours, which hit gold status in short time. After the album was released, he was nominated for the 2008 Spellemannsprisen best new artist award, with the lead single "Lost" nominated for song of the year, but he won neither awards. He subsequently resumed touring, and announced that a second album was in the works.

=== Retirement and return ===
In early 2010, Bratland retired from the spotlight after suffering from a burnout following his massive workload the previous two years. He relocated to Bergen, where he resumed his studies to become a hair dresser. He graduated the following spring, and has worked as a hair dresser in Bergen since. In a 2011 interview with VG, he did not deny a possible comeback in the future, but confirmed that music was no longer his main priority, as he got "fed up with being famous".

In December 2012, Bratland announced that he had begun working on new material for his previously announced second album, which he quit working on after retiring in 2010. He announced that the new album, of which no date or title has been set, would be darker and more personal than his previous record. He has, since his retirement, abandoned his recognized emo style for a more androgynous, compared by some to Adam Lambert. On 7 December 2012 he made his first television appearance in over two and a half years.

In autumn 2014 Erlend returned, with his first recording since 2008, when he released the single and video "Silent Sister". On 20 January 2015 it was announced that he would participate in the final of Melodi Grand Prix, the Norwegian selection for the Eurovision Song Contest, with the song "Thunderstruck". He finished 2nd in the final. On 25 January 2019, he was revealed to be returning to Melodi Grand Prix with the song "Sing for You".

== Personal life ==
Bratland publicly acknowledged that he was gay during an interview with God Kveld, Norge in 2010, after two years of speculation from the press. In a 2011 interview, he stated that he had been aware of his homosexuality "as long as I've known", and that his friends and family had been equally aware of it.

He currently lives in Tønsberg, working as a full-time hair dresser.

== Discography ==
=== Albums ===
Year	Title	Chart position Norway	Sertifications
2008	True Colors: Released: 27 October 2008; Label: Sony BMG	2nd	Gold

=== Singles ===
Year	Title	Chart position Norway	Album
2008	"Lost"	1st	True Colors
2008	"Still Water"	1st	True Colors
2014	"Silent Sister"		
2015	"Thunderstruck"		
