= Quick Style =

Norwegian dance group

Background information
- Also known as: Quick Crew
- Origin: Oslo, Norway
- Genre: Hip hop dance
- Occupations: YouTuber; Dancer; Hip Hop
- Years active: 2006–present
- Members: Founding members: Bilal Malik; Nasir Sirikhan; Suleman Malik; Other members: Yasin Tatby; William Gamborg; Oskar Vigren; Egil Mikael; David Leung; Jan Erik Santos; Kevin Vasquez; Arvin Go; Bjørn Fredrik Strøm
- Website: www.thequickstyle.com

YouTube information
- Channel: TheQuickStyle
- Years active: 2009–present
- Genres: Dancing; Hip Hop; music
- Subscribers: 3.6 million
- Views: 1.01 billion
- Last updated: 28 November 2024

Quick Style or The Quick Style and also known as the Quick Crew, is a Norwegian hip-hop/urban dance group founded by two Norwegian-Pakistani twins, Suleman and Bilal Malik, and their Norwegian-Thai childhood friend Nasir Sirikhan. The group is notable for having won Norske Talenter, the Norwegian edition of the Got Talent franchise, in 2009. They have also participated in NBC's World of Dance and other dance competitions.

== History ==
Quick Style was formed in 2006 by the twins Suleman Malik and Bilal Malik, and their childhood friend Nasir Sirikhan. The Malik brothers are of Pakistani descent, while Sirikhan is of Thai heritage with partial Pakistani ancestry. They had an interest in music and dance since childhood and started to take dance classes at X-Ray, a local youth club in Oslo.

In early 2007, the twins' elder brother Ibrar Malik joined the team as their manager. They started to participate in and win local and national dance battles and competitions.

In 2008, they began to represent Norway in international dance competitions organized by the International Dance Organization / IDO. The same year the three of them participated in the IDO Hip Hop World Championship in Bremen, Germany. The group competed in the adult male solo category and secured a spot in the finals. They also competed as a duo and achieved the first position becoming World Champions for the first time.

In 2009, the whole crew competed again at the IDO European and World Championship event as a solo, and the group as a duo and achieved spots in the finals with the group taking second and third position respectively, and Suleman taking second position as a male solo.

In the same year, they also won "Norway's Got Talent" or Norske Talenter on TV2, winning a prize of 500,000 NOK, which also resulted in Sony Music signing them as their first artists which were not musicians. After this win, they toured the whole country and performed at some of the biggest events around Norway such as "VG Lista Top 20". They also started to get a lot of views and subscribers on their YouTube channel where they often posted their dance routines, which led to invitations from international events to perform, judge, or teach.

In 2010, they attended the IDO Hip Hop World Championship one last time, where the twins once again became World Champions in the Adult Duo category, and all three members achieved spots in the finals as Adult Solo, and Suleman once again took a second position. They have since then worked with major international brands like Samsung, Redbull, Puma, Monster, and Nike, and performed at big World stages and TV shows in countries like USA, Japan, China, Dubai, and Korea.

In 2017, they participated in the American dance show, NBC's World of Dance and BBIC Korea.

In 2020, they competed on the second season of America's Got Talent: The Champions but were eliminated in the preliminary rounds.

In July 2022, a video of the group performing at Suleman's wedding went viral on social media. The full version of the video posted in their YouTube channel on 19 June 2022 has garnered over 170 million views as of January 2026.

In 2025, Quick Style joined the International Dance League (IDL) as a founding professional franchise team. The league was created by Steezy co-founders Connor Lim and Evan Zhou. At the IDL launch event on July 26, 2025 held at the Shrine Expo Hall in Los Angeles, the group competed against USA's GRV, to which they lost 0–5. Quick Style entered the following year with 10 returning members from the launch event and 15 new members. Notably, the new roster was all-female.

IDL 2026 matches and results
Series	Round	Opponent	Result	Score
New York	1	(United States) GRV	Won	4–3
New York	2	(Canada) Brotherhood / (New Zealand) Royal Family	Second	99.28, 89.97, 86.25
Vancouver	1	(ASEAN) Jam Republic	Lost	0–7
Sydney	1	(South Korea) 1Million	Lost	0–7
Seoul	1	(Canada) Brotherhood	Lost	0–7
Los Angeles	1	(New Zealand) Royal Family	Lost	0–7
Final (Los Angeles)	1	(Canada) Brotherhood (Seed 1)	Lost	0–7

Quick Style is currently involved in artist management, shows, teaching classes, and workshops. They have two working dance studios and judge international dance events and competitions.

== Notable Projects ==
=== Strawhatz ===
Strawhatz allows for the blending of different cultures into urban dance to create a unique style with both fusion visuals and sound.

- Strawhatz X Yinglee:
- Strawhatz: Koto
- Strawhatz ft.: Kimono
- Strawhatz X Jinjo Crew: Heroes
- Strawhatz X Samsung Galaxy S5 Norway Official Release
- Strawhatz X Toyota, Japan

=== BTS and Big-Hit Entertainment ===
Quick Style has worked thrice so far on choreography for BTS' songs in collaboration with Keone Madrid, BTS' choreographer Son Sung Deuk and Team Quick Style MG.

- Save Me
- Blood Sweat & Tears
- Boy With Luv
- Dynamite

=== West Meets East ===
A 5-part documentary-based travel series presented by Quick Style filmed by director/filmmaker Christian Bastiansen. It takes the viewer on a journey through 5 different cities in China through the eyes of Bilal, Suleman and Nasir (Quick Style). It covers dance, travel, cultural experiences and interactions, and also gives an insight into the personalities of all three members. In these episodes, they also dance free-style to music by the Shanghai Restoration Project .

- Episode 1: Xiamen
- Episode 2: Beijing
- Episode 3: Shanghai
- Episode 4: Guangzhou

=== Television appearances ===
Quick Style has appeared on various TV shows as contestants, judges and guest performers.

- Shall We Dance – TV5 Philippines
- “Star Game”
- Norway's Got Talent/Norske Talenter
  - (2009 – winner)
    - (2015 – guest performance)
      - (2017 – guest performance)
- “My Dance Crew”
- Chinese New Year Special - Hunan TV China
- "Battle Ground" (2016) in Malaysia
- World of Dance on NBC judged by Jennifer Lopez, Ne-Yo and Derek Hough and hosted by Jenna Dewan.
- "Senkveld TV2"
- Indias best dancer season 3 2023 as a guest performance
- Dance Plus pro 2024 as a guest performance
- Kana Yaari (2022)

Aside from these, they have appeared in a number of shows in France, Vietnam, Thailand, and Japan.
