= Solveig Kloppen =

Norwegian television presenter, comedian and actress

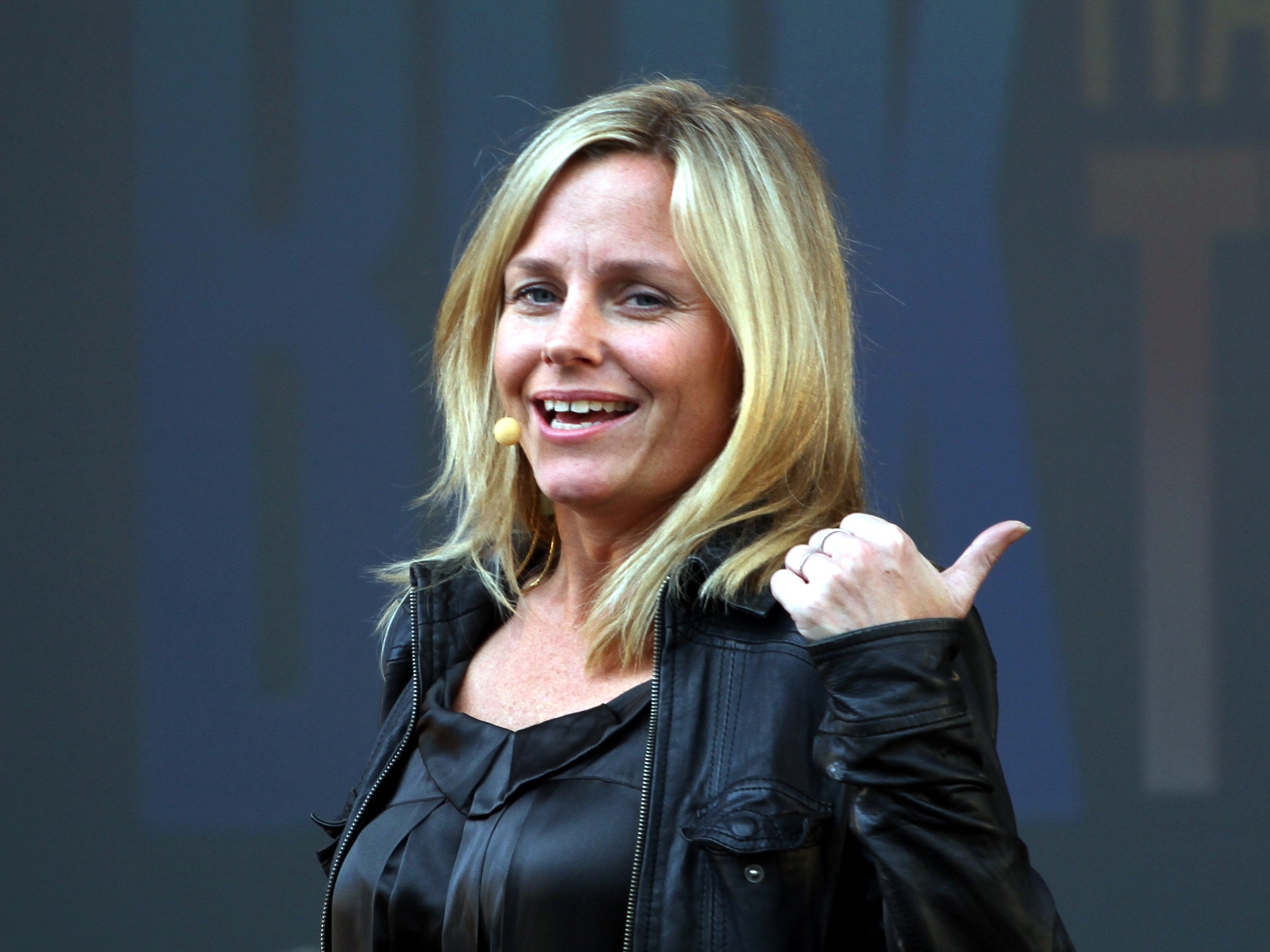
- Born: 10 July 1971 (age 55); Trondheim, Norway
- Occupations: Journalist; Actress; TV hostess

Solveig Kloppen (born 10 June 1971) is a Norwegian journalist, actress and TV hostess.

She is best known as hostess for "Idol", the Norwegian version of Pop Idol. She grew up in Vik in Sogn and at Jessheim.

== Awards and nominations ==
Year	Organization	Category	Nominee(s)	Result	Ref.
2017	Gullruten	Best Female Host	Herself for En kveld hos Kloppen	Pending	
