= Bjarne Brøndbo =

Norwegian singer (born 1964)

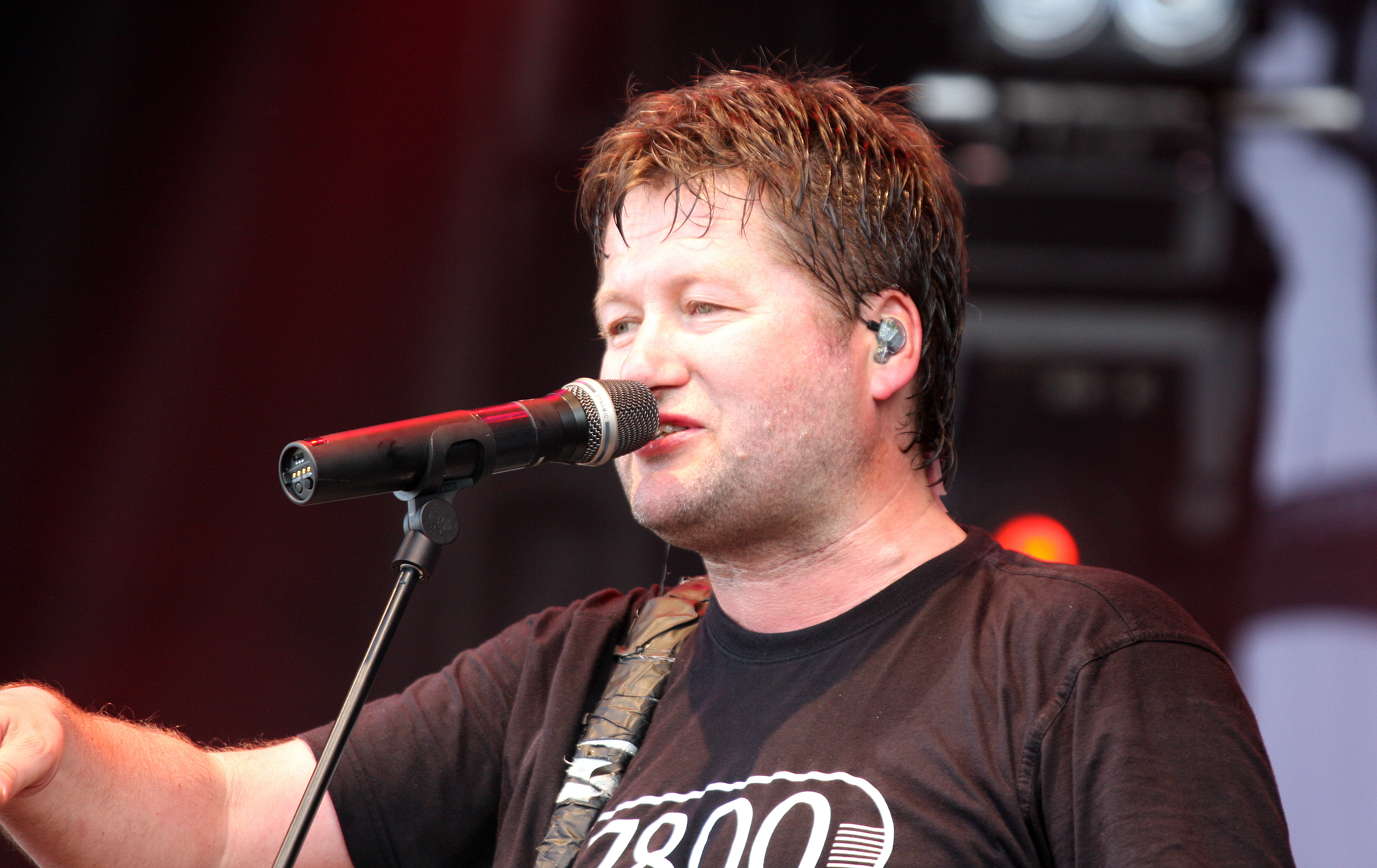
Bjarne Brøndbo

Bjarne Arnstein Brøndbo (born 19 September 1964 in Namsos Municipality, Norway) is the vocalist and the front figure in the Norwegian rock group D.D.E. since the start in 1992. Brøndbo has previously played in the bands Humanic (1978–1985) and After Dark (1984–1991). He is the brother of drummer Eskil Brøndbo and the cousin of the Electronica musician Rune "Sternklang" Brøndbo.

== Education ==
Bjarne Brøndbo took an education to become a teacher, but after his music career became successful he hasn't worked much in that profession. He has his own company, Namdal bilopphoggeri, a car breakers and online car spares company. He is married and has three children.

== Discography ==
=== Album ===
- 1993 D.D.E. Rai-Rai
- 1994 D.D.E. Rai 2
- 1996 D.D.E. Det går likar no
- 1998 D.D.E. OHWÆÆÆÆÆH !!!
- 1999 D.D.E. No e D.D.E. jul igjen
- 2000 D.D.E. Jippi'
- 2001 D.D.E. Vi ska fæst — aill' mot aill'
- 2003 D.D.E. Vi e konga (Percussion)
- 2005 D.D.E. Næ næ næ næ næ næ

=== Live albums/compilations ===
- 1995 D.D.E. Det è D.D.E. (live)
- 2002 D.D.E. Her bli de liv-det beste 1992–2002
