= Mia Gundersen =

Norwegian singer and actress (born 1961)

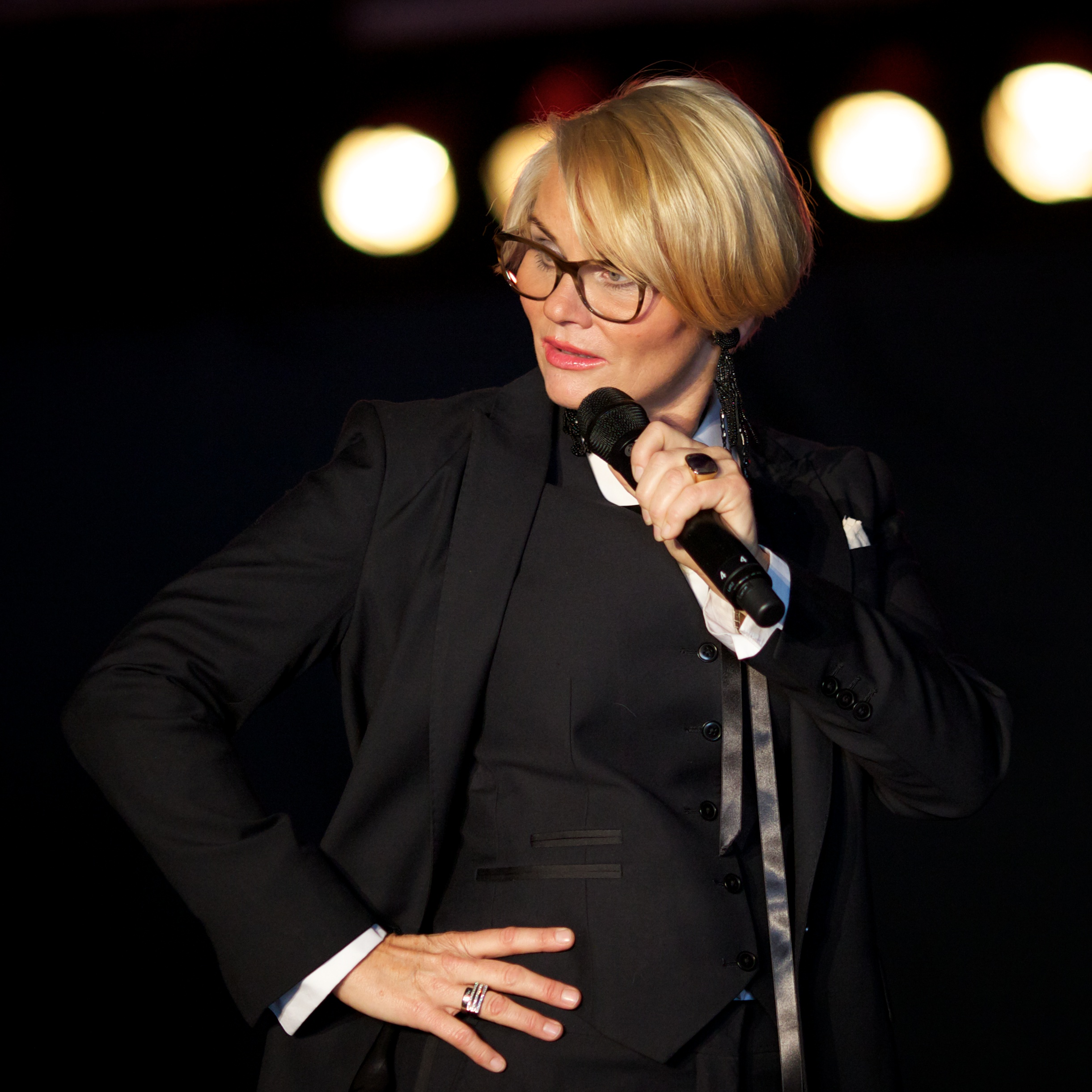
- Gundersen in 2011
- Born: Mariann Gundersen; 27 October 1961 (age 64); Stavanger, Norway
- Occupations: singer and actress

Mia Gundersen (born 27 October 1961) is a Norwegian singer and actress.

She was born in Stavanger. Gundersen made her album debut in 1982 along with the group Asfalt, and as solo artist in 1987 with the album Temptation. She made her stage debut at Rogaland Teater in 1987, in the cabaret Johanna og Broremann. Her breakthrough was as the character "Eliza Doolittle" in the musical My Fair Lady in 1990. Gundersen has participated in the song contest Melodi Grand Prix several times. She played a leading role in the television soap series Offshore (1996–1999).
