= List of television stations in Norway =

This is a list of television stations in Norway.

== Terrestrial channels ==
These channels are available as via cable and satellite systems. The Norwegian analogue terrestrial net is closed and replaced with a digital net. The NRK channels are open, the other channels are encrypted and subscriptions are sold by www.rikstv.no

| Channel | Description | Financed by | Owned by | Launched | Terrestrial coverage |
|---|---|---|---|---|---|
| NRK1 | Public Broadcaster | Licence | Norsk Rikskringkasting | 1960 | 99,8% |
| NRK2 | Public Broadcaster | Licence | Norsk Rikskringkasting | 1996 | 80% |
| NRK Super and NRK3 | Public Broadcaster | Licence | Norsk Rikskringkasting | 2007 | 80% |
| TV 2 Direkte | General Entertainment Channel | Commercials | TV 2 Group (Egmont Group) | 1992 | 92% |
| TVNorge | General Entertainment Channel | Commercials | Skydance Nordics | 1988 | Sharing frequences with many local-TV stations. |
| TV3 | General Entertainment Channel | Commercials | Viaplay Group | 1990 | |

== Cable and satellite television ==
=== Norsk Rikskringkasting ===
- NRK1 (generalist)
- NRK2 (generalist)
- NRK3 (Youth channel)
- NRK Super (Children channel)
- NRK Tegnspråk (Television channel for those with a hearing impairment. This channel adapts shows from the other national channels, so that they are appropriate for those with hearing loss, for example by adding sign language and/or subtitles)

=== TV 2 ===
- TV 2 Direkte (generalist)
- TV 2 Nyheter (news channel)
- TV 2 Sport (sports channel)
  - TV 2 Sport 1
  - TV 2 Sport 2
  - TV 2 Sport Premium 1
  - TV 2 Sport Premium 2
- TV 2 Zebra (youth programs, interactive programs and live sports)
- TV 2 Livsstil (lifestyle)

=== TV4 AB ===
- Hits
- Stars
- SF-kanalen

=== Viaplay Group/MTG ===
- TV3 (general entertainment)
- TV3+ (Men's channel)
- TV6 (Women's channel)
- V Classics (classic series)
- V Crime (crime series)
- V Film (movies)
  - V Film Premiere
  - V Film Action
  - V Film Hits
  - V Film Family
- V Series (series)
- V Sport (sports)
  - V Sport +
  - V Sport 1
  - V Sport 2
  - V Sport 3
  - V Sport Golf
  - V Sport Live
  - V Sport Premier League
  - V Sport Ultra

=== Skydance Nordics ===
- TVNorge (general entertainment)
- FEM (Women's channel)
- REX (Men's channel)
- VOX (Adult/"Grown ups" channel)
- Discovery Channel (documentary)
- Eurosport Norge (sports)
- TLC Norway (lifestyle)

=== Others ===
- VGTV, owned by Schibsted Norge AS
- Matkanalen, owned by Schibsted Norge AS
- Canal Motor, owned by Intele, programs about racing, cars, motorcycles & Motors
- Rikstoto Direkte, owned by Norsk Rikstoto, horse racing
- Verdikanalen (general/religious)
- Visjon Norge (Christian), owned by iVisjon
- tvins (home shopping), owned by Thane Direct
- Heim TV
- Naturkanal 1
- Norway Live
- Frikanalen
- Lokal TV
- TV Glad
- Fatstone.TV, (Fatstone Media AS) Norwegian owned, Outdoor and Action sports channel
- Kanal 10 Norge (Christian)
- TV 12 Bedehuskanalen (Christian)
- TVL (Christian)

== Transnational television channels ==
=== Localised and non-localised versions ===
==== BBC Studios ====
- BBC Nordic

==== AMC Networks International ====
- Extreme Sports Channel

==== The Walt Disney Company ====
- Disney Channel Scandinavia
- National Geographic Channel Scandinavia
- National Geographic Channel HD
- National Geographic Wild

==== Playboy Enterprises ====
- The Adult Channel
- Playboy TV
- Spice Network

==== Skydance Nordics ====
- Animal Planet (Nordic)
- Cartoonito (Nordic)
- Cartoon Network (Nordic)
- Discovery Science
- Eurosport 1
- Food Network
- Investigation Discovery
- MTV Europe
- Nickelodeon (Scandinavia)
- Nick Jr. (Scandinavia)
- Nicktoons (Scandinavia)

==== NBCUniversal International Networks/Skydance Europe & Africa ====
- SkyShowtime 1
- SkyShowtime 2

==== Viasat World ====
- Viasat Explore
- Viasat History
- Viasat Nature

==== A+E Networks ====
- History
- History HD
- H2

=== Others ===
- Bloomberg TV, owned by Michael Bloomberg
- CNBC Nordic, owned by Versant
- E!, owned by Comcast, news and programs about the entertainment industry
- The God Channel
- God 2
- Motors TV
- Penthouse TV
- Private Blue
- The Poker Channel
- Travel Channel, owned by Warner Bros. Discovery

=== Non-localised versions ===
Channels shown in their original format, without local subtitles or local audio.

- 3ABN International
- 3sat
- BBC News
- BEN Television
- Club - Entertainment for women
- CNN International - 24/7 News channel owned by Warner Bros. Discovery
- DR1 – See also Danmarks Radio
- DR2 – See also Danmarks Radio
- Dizi
- Euronews
- Fashion TV
- Fox News Channel
- Health Channel
- Hope Channel International
- Liverpool TV
- Love Nature
- Mezzo TV
- MUTV
- RTL
- Sat1
- Sky News - 24/7 News channel owned by Comcast
- Sony Entertainment Television Asia
- SVT1 – See also Sveriges Television
- SVT2 – See also Sveriges Television
- Rai Uno
- TBN Europe
- TV2
- TV4
- TV5Monde
- TV8
- TVE Internacional
- TV Finland
- TRT World
- Wonderful - Religious channel
- YLE TV1 – See also Yleisradio
- YLE TV2 – See also Yleisradio
- Zee TV

== Other channels ==
=== Defunct television channels ===
- 3+ - General entertainment channel (1 July 1996 - 1 October 1996)
- BBC Brit - Entertainment channel Merged with BBC Nordic (2015–2023)
- BBC Earth - Documentary channel Merged with BBC Nordic (2015–2023)
- BBC Entertainment (Replaced BBC Prime on December 1, 2008).
- BBC Food - Food channel Merged with BBC Lifestyle (2004–2008)
- BBC Prime - Entertainment channel replaced by BBC Entertainment (???? - 2008)
- BBC HD, High Definition television channel.
- Canal 9 (2011–2014)
- C More Action
- C More Kids
- C More Film - Movie channel (2004–2006)
- C More Film 2 - Movie channel (2004–2006)
- C More Emotion
- C More Extreme
- C More First (2012–2023)
- C More Hockey (2010–2023)
- C More Live (2016–2023)
- C More Series (2012–2023)
- C More Sport HD (sports in high-definition)
- C More Tennis
- Canal+ Comedy (2006–2010)
- Canal+ Action
- Canal+ Drama
- Canal+ Family
- Canal+ Emotion
- Canal+ Film HD (high-definition movies)
- Canal+ Fotball
- Canal+ Sport 2
- Canal+ Sport 3
- Canal+ Hockey
- Canal+ Sport Extra
- Canal+ Sport HD (sports in high-definition)
- Canal M - Shopping channel (1998–1999)
- CBS Reality (1998–2026)
- Chelsea TV (2001–2019)
- Cinema 1 - Movie Channel (1995–2004)
- Cinema 2 - Timeshift channel for Cinema 1 (2002–2004)
- Cinema 3 - Timeshift channel for Cinema 2 (2002–2004)
- FOX - general entertainment
- Fox Crime
- Disney Junior Scandinavia - Children's channel (2006–2024)
- Disney XD Scandinavia - Children's channel (2009–2020)
- Discovery World - Documentary channel (1998–2020)
- ESPN America - Sports channel
- ESPN Classic - Sports classic channel
- Fight+ - Combat Sports channel (March, 2006 - December, 2006)
- FilmMax - Movie Channel (???? - 1995)
- FilmNet 1 - Movie Channel (1985–1996) (See Canal+)
- FilmNet 2 - Movie Channel (1985–1996)
- Fox Kids Nordic - Children's channel (1998–2004) (changed name to Jetix, see below)
- Hallmark Channel Scandilux - Movie channel (1996–2009)
- Janco Visjon - General entertainment channel (1986–1987)
- Jetix Scandinavia - Children's channel (2004–2009) (replaced by Disney XD)
- Kiosk - 8 pay-per-view channels (1997–2007)
- K-T.V.
- Life TV (2000–2019)
- Metropol TV - Youth-oriented entertainment channel (1999–2002)
- Moox Live - Youth channel with user-generated content (December, 2006 - August, 2007)
- Motorsport.tv
- MTV 80s (2020–2025)
- MTV 90s (2020–2025)
- MTV 00s (2021–2025)
- Club MTV (2008–2025)
- MTV Hits (2014–2025)
- MTV Live (2018–2025)
- Norsk TV1 - General entertainment channel (1987–1990) (Merged with TVNorge)
- Nyhetskanalen - News channel (1997–1998)
- The Studio - Movie channel (2001–2003)
- Rush HD
- Showtime Scandinavia - Action and horror movies
- Silver - Independent Movies
- Sky Entertainment
- Sportkanalen - Sports channel (1996–1997)
- Star! Scandinavia
- SuperSport - Sports channel (1995–1997) (compare now Canal+ Sport)
- Turner Classic Movies - Movie Channel
- Toon Disney Scandinavia - Children's channel (2005–2009) (replaced by Disney XD)
- TNT
- The Voice TV Norway
- TV+ - General entertainment channel (1994–1995)
- TV 2 Bliss
- TV 2 Filmkanalen (movies) (2006–2015)
- TV 2 Humor
- TV 2 Science Fiction (Science fiction)(Web-TV channel) (2009–2011)
- TV 2 Sonen 24/7 - Interactive television channel (March, 2007 - July, 2007)
- TV4 Norge - General entertainment channel (1990–1992)
- TV6 - Women's channel (1994–1998) (Replaced with TV6 Nature World/TV6 Action World)
- TV1000 2 - Timeshift channel for TV1000 (2002–2004)
- TV1000 3 - Timeshift channel for TV1000 (2002–2004)
- VH1 - Music channel
- VH1 Classic - Music channel
- Viasat 3D
- Viasat Film Comedy
- Viasat Fotball
- Viasat Hockey
- Viasat Motor
- Viasat Plus - General entertainment channel (2000–2002)
- Viasat SportN - Sports channel (2005–2009) (replaced by Viasat Fotball)
- Viasat Sport 2 - Soccer channel (2004–2008)
- Viasat Sport 3 - Action sports channel (2004–2008)
- Viasat Sport 24 - Sports channel (2005–2007)
- Viasat Ticket (pay-per-view)
- Voom HD International - General enteraiment channel (2005–2009)
- ZTV Norway - Youth channel (2002 - September 5, 2007)

=== Channels with former names ===
- Canal+ Gul now Canal+ First
- Canal+ Blå now Canal+ Hits
- Canal+ Zap now Canal+ Sport
- C More HD now Canal+ HD
- Canal+ now Canal+ Drama
- TV 2 Bliss now TV 2 Livsstil
- Canal+ now C More
- TV 2 Premier League now TV 2 Sport Premium
- TV 2 Nyhetskanalen now TV 2 Nyheter
- V4 now TV3+
- MAX now REX

== See also ==
- Television in Norway
