= Norges Televisjon =

Operator of the Norwegian digital terrestrial television network

Norges Televisjon AS
- Company type: Joint venture
- Industry: Broadcasting
- Founded: 15 February 2002
- Headquarters: Lysaker, Norway
- Area served: Norway
- Key people: Svein R. Aarvik (CEO)
- Owner: Norwegian Broadcasting Corporation; TV 2 Telenor
- Website: www.ntv.no

Norges Televisjon AS, or NTV, operates the digital terrestrial television (DTT) network in Norway. The infrastructure is owned by the Telenor-subsidiary Norkring, while the content is provided by the Norwegian Broadcasting Corporation (NRK) and RiksTV. The company is owned in equal parts by NRK, TV 2 and Telenor. The same companies also own RiksTV. RiksTV offers a range of pay television channels.

NTV was established in 2002, and received a 15-year concession in 2006. DTT was introduced gradually starting in 2007, and by the end of 2008, full coverage had been reached. In 2008, the analog shutdown started, which was completed by December 2009. The main network will provide digital TV-signals to 95 percent of the Norwegian population, including any areas in a satellite television shadow.

== History ==
Norkring, a Telenor subsidiary that also owns the analog television network, started trial sending of DTT in 1999, based on DVB-T and MPEG-2 technology. Norsk Televisjon was founded by NRK and TV 2 on 15 February 2002. Telenor became a partner on 16 September 2005. The concession was awarded at the Norwegian Ministry of Culture on 2 July 2006, with a duration of 15 years.

The company was established to finance the DTT network in Norway. With a needed investment of NOK 1.5 billion, it was planned that this could be financed by private investors by allowing them to use most of the capacity to distribute pay TV, through the company RiksTV. The physical installations are owned by Norkring, and broadcasting is done with DVB-T standard using MPEG-4 encoding.

DTT was introduced gradually starting in 2007, and by the end of 2008, full coverage had been reached. In 2008, the analog shutdown started, after a 6–12 months period of parallel operation in each region, which was completed at the end of 2009. At the beginning, all channels available in the analog network were also available unencrypted in the digital network, including the NRK channels, TV 2 and local television. In 2010, TV 2 became a pay channel, with all non-NRK channels only available via a subscription from RiksTV.

== Content ==
=== Norwegian Broadcasting Corporation ===
Three television channels and thirteen unencrypted radio channels are available. These are financed through television licence. The television channels are NRK1, NRK2 and NRK3/NRK Super (these broadcast on the same channel at different times). The radio channels are NRK P1, NRK P2, NRK P3, NRK mP3, NRK Super, NRK Sport, NRK Alltid Nyheter, NRK Sámi Radio, NRK P1+, NRK Jazz, NRK Folkemusikk, NRK Klassisk and NRK Stortinget.

=== RiksTV ===
The first channels were announced on 12 June 2007 were: TV 2, TVNorge, TV 3, TV 2 Zebra, Discovery Channel, Disney Channel, The Voice TV, SportN, TV 2 Filmkanalen, TV 2 Nyhetskanalen, Viasat 4, TVNorge2 (was named FEM the next day), Canal+ Sport 1 and Canal+ Film 1. The radio channels P4, Kanal 24 and Radio 1 were also included.

On 4 July, it was announced that Animal Planet, Canal+ Film 2, the National Geographic Channel, TV 2 Sport and local television would launch later on. It was however announced in July that BBC World would become a part of the RiksTV package and that Animal Planet, Canal+ Film 2 and National Geographic would be a part of the package from the start, thanks to new compression technology.

== Coverage ==
Government regulations states that the first multiplex must cover at least 95% of the population. Coverage is defined as sufficient field strength at a permanent residence with a directional outdoor antenna placed up to 10 meters above the ground. Persons permanently living in residential areas located in defined satellite shadow shall also have access to the programs in this multiplex. The second multiplex must be rolled-out in parallel with the first multiplex and also offer 95% population coverage. However, it does not need to cover the satellite shadow areas.

A supplementary network consisting of 400–800 antennas will be established to cover about 12,000 households, that are unable to receive TV-signals either from satellite, cable or broadband distributions.

A satellite shadow area has been mainly defined as following:

- No access to cable network or other technologies such as broadband.
- Cannot receive signals from a satellite where NRK1, NRK2 and TV2 are available because: 1) no clear line of sight from the parabolic antenna to the satellite, even when the antenna is placed in an optimum location. 2) the line of sight and reception is obstructed by mountains or other topographic conditions.

== See also ==
- Television in Norway
