= Mass media in Norway =

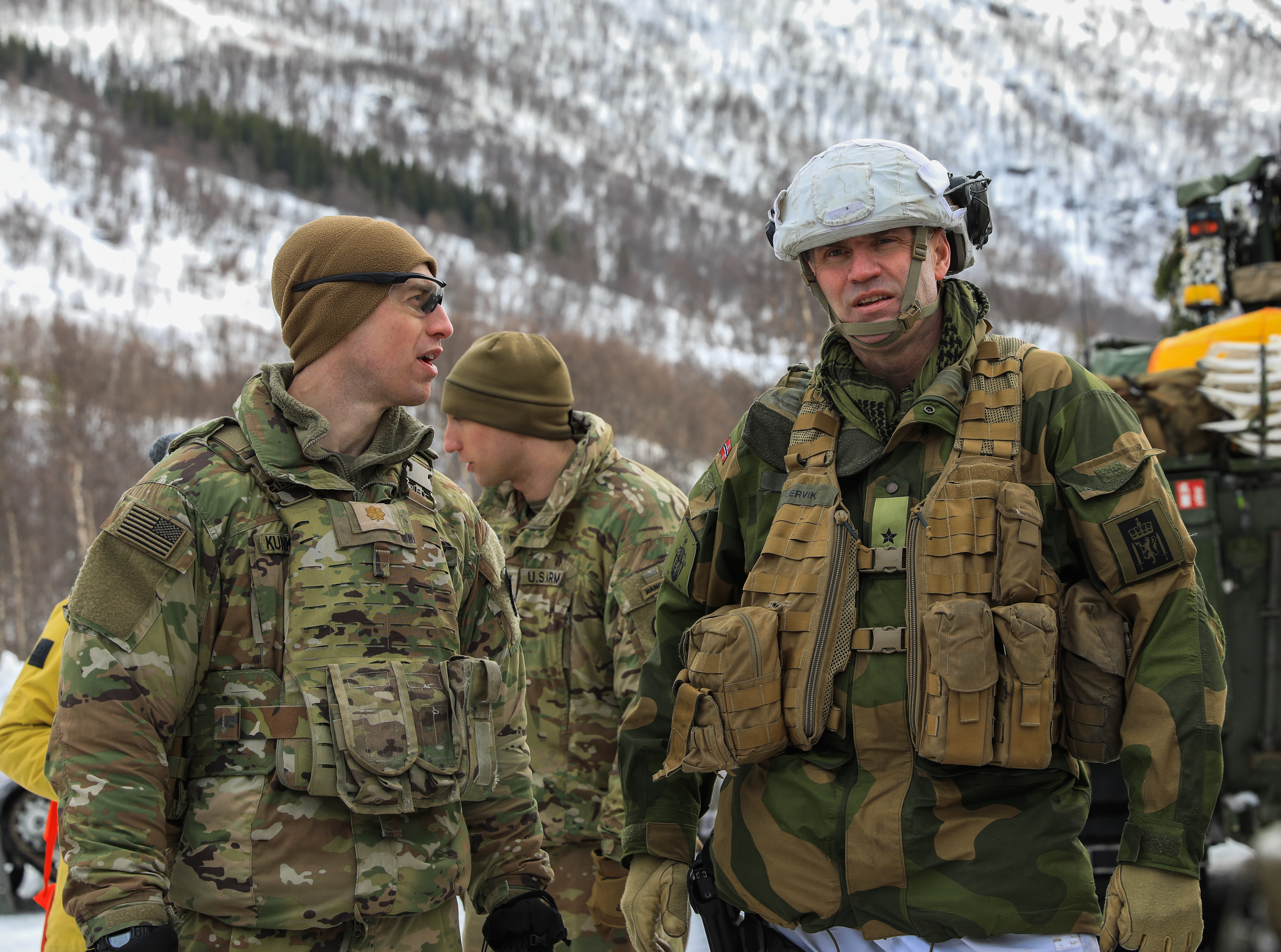
U S Army MLRS battalion, Allied militaries conduct static display for external media during exercise in Norway

Mass media in Norway outlines the current state of the press, television, radio, film and cinema, and social media in Norway.

== Press ==
Reporters Without Borders ranks Norway 1st in its Worldwide Press Freedom Index. Freedom of the press in Norway dates back to the constitution of 1814. Most of the Norwegian press is privately owned and self-regulated; however, the state provides press support.

== Television ==
The two companies dominating the Norwegian terrestrial broadcast television are the government-owned NRK (with four main services, NRK1, NRK2, NRK3 and NRK Super) and TV2 (with TV 2 Filmkanalen, TV 2 Nyhetskanalen, TV 2 Sport, TV 2 Zebra and TV 2 Livsstil). Other, long-running channels are TVNorge and TV3.

== Radio ==
National radio is dominated by the public-service company NRK, which is funded from the television licence fee payable by the owners of television sets. NRK provides programming on three radio channels – NRK P1, NRK P2, and NRK P3 – broadcast on FM and via DAB. A number of further specialist channels are broadcast exclusively on DAB, DVB-T, and the internet including Radio Norway Direct Norway's new English language Radio Station.

Additionally, there are a number of commercial radio stations as well as local radio stations run by various non-profit organizations.

== Social media ==
As of June 2023, it is estimated that 3.4M Norwegians use Facebook. For comparison, the total number of inhabitants is about 5,504,329 people.

== Institutions ==
Institutions within organized labour are the Norwegian Union of Journalists, the Association of Norwegian Editors and the Norwegian Media Businesses' Association—these are organized in the umbrella Norwegian Press Association. The Press Association is responsible for Pressens Faglige Utvalg, which oversees the Ethical Code of Practice for the Norwegian Press. The Broadcasting Council oversees the state-owned Norwegian Broadcasting Corporation. The Norwegian Media Authority contributes to the enforcement government regulations.

== Regulation ==
The media systems in Scandinavian countries are twin-duopolistic with powerful public service broadcasting and periodic strong government intervention. Hallin and Mancini introduced the Norwegian media system as Democratic Corporatist. Newspapers started early and developed very well without state regulation until the 1960s. The rise of the advertising industry helped the most powerful newspapers grow increasingly, while the little publications were struggling at the bottom of the market. Because of the lack of diversity in the newspaper industry, the Norwegian Government took action, affecting the true freedom of speech. In 1969, Norwegian government started to provide press subsidies to small local newspapers. But this method was not able to solve the problem completely. In 1997, compelled by the concern of the media ownership concentration, Norwegian legislators passed the Media Ownership Act entrusting the Norwegian Media Authority the power to interfere the media cases when the press freedom and media plurality was threatened. The Act was amended in 2005 and 2006 and revised in 2013.

The basic foundation of Norwegian regulation of the media sector is to ensure freedom of speech, structural pluralism, national language and culture and the protection of children from harmful media content. Relative regulatory incentives includes the Media Ownership Law, the Broadcasting Act, and the Editorial Independence Act. NOU 1988:36 stated that a fundamental premise of all Norwegian media regulation is that news media serves as an oppositional force to power. The condition for news media to achieve this role is the peaceful environment of diversity of editorial ownership and free speech. White Paper No.57 claimed that real content diversity can only be attained by a pluralistically owned and independent editorial media whose production is founded on the principles of journalistic professionalism. To ensure this diversity, Norwegian government regulates the framework conditions of the media and primarily focuses the regulation on pluralistic ownership.

== See also ==
- Communications in Norway
- Culture of Norway
- Internet in Norway
- Open access in Norway

Lists

- List of Norwegian newspapers
- List of Norwegian magazines
- List of Norwegian television channels
- List of Norwegian-language radio stations
- List of Norwegian writers
