= Television in Norway =

Television in Norway was introduced in 1954, but the first television program was only shown in 1958, and regular broadcasts did not start until 1960. Like Denmark, Norway had only one television channel until the 1980s. Some 40% of the population have cable TV, and 30% have satellite TV. Another 30% have terrestrial television only.

In Norway, all advertising containing political messages and advertising aimed at children are prohibited. Channels such as TV3 are allowed to broadcast commercial breaks, as these channels are being broadcast via satellite from the United Kingdom.

Non-Norwegian television programs (as well as portions of Norwegian shows with foreign language dialogue) are subtitled, while for children's programs, are dubbed.

== Analogue terrestrial television ==
The first television channel in Norway, NRK1 was started officially in 1960 (then under the name NRK). NRK had made television programs since 1953. A second television channel, TV 2 was started in 1992. NRK started a second television channel, NRK2 in 1996. NRK1 goes out to 99,8% of all households, while TV2 has a 92% coverage and NRK2 and NRK3/NRK Super has 80% coverage. There are today 24 local television channels in the country, all terrestrially transmitted. The first local channel, TVBudstikka was started in 1986. Many of them cooperate with TVNorge, so that TVNorge use their transmitters when they are not broadcasting any programs.

Channel	Description	Financed by	Owned by	Launched	Terrestrial coverage
NRK1	Public Broadcaster	Licence	Norsk Rikskringkasting	1960	99,8%
NRK2	Public Broadcaster	Licence	Norsk Rikskringkasting	1996	80%
NRK Super and NRK3	Public Broadcaster	Licence	Norsk Rikskringkasting	2007	80%
TV 2	General Entertainment Channel	Commercials	TV 2 Group (Egmont Group)	1992	92%
TVNorge	General Entertainment Channel	Commercials	Discovery Communications Nordic	1988	Sharing frequencies with many local television stations.

== Digital terrestrial television ==
The introduction of DVB-T is regulated by the Ministry of Culture and Church Affairs. Analogue TV broadcasting was completely closed on 1 December 2009. Norway uses the DVB H.264/MPEG-4 AVC coding standards.

In June 2002, a 12-year nationwide licence, including the roll-out of infrastructure, was publicly announced, met only by the application of Norges Televisjon (NTV), a joint venture between the state-owned broadcaster NRK, the leading private broadcaster TV 2, and the largest Norwegian telecommunications company Telenor. In February 2004, the Norwegian parliament passed the final regulations on digital broadcasting to the Ministry of Culture and Church Affairs, leaving the Ministry to create a licence agreement for NTV. The Ministry showed their proposal for a licence in December 2004.

NTV was faced with more complicated regulations than they expected (such as the licence running already from roll-out of infrastructure). Therefore, in February 2005, NTV applied for extending their licence period from 12 years to 15 years, and consequently the Ministry publicly announced the licence once again, announcement period expiring 2 May 2005. If licence is granted NTV during 2005, the company says it plans to roll out infrastructure during 2006–2009, offering the Norwegian public between 15 and 18 TV stations; of them NRK1, NRK2, TV2, TV2 Zebra and a local channel.

The EFTA competition authorities, ESA, has protested on the application process, saying the ministry is not in position to grant the DVB-T licence to a state-owned company like NTV, but ministry says this protest will not affect their decision.

Digital terrestrial television is now available in all counties of Norway. Analogue TV broadcasting was switched off in Rogaland (4 March 2008), Østfold (29 April 2008), Oslo and Akershus (20 May 2008), Buskerud, Vestfold and Telemark (2 September 2008), Hordaland (30 September 2008) and Møre og Romsdal (28 October 2008).

== Cable and satellite television ==
When the television and radio monopoly of NRK was lifted in 1982, cable television networks that carried foreign TV channels started to appear in the larger cities around the country. When satellite television was allowed in 1986 it paved the way for several new Norwegian channels. The first of these TVNorge began broadcasting in 1988 and was soon followed by TV3 in 1990.

== National Community TV channel ==
In January 2009 the Minister of Culture inaugurated Frikanalen, a national community channel which broadcasts from Oslo on the national DTT-network established in 2008, which reaches 98% of Norwegian households. Frikanalen is a non-profit open channel for NGOs, and today has 57 member organisations. The channel is open to everyone. Editorial responsibility lies with the producers. All programs are archived on internet and can be seen there. The goal of Frikanalen is to strengthen freedom of expression and participative democracy by giving people more opportunity to express themselves through television.

== Viewing shares ==
The following table shows the shares of total viewing for a few selected Norwegian channels.

	92	93	94	95	96	97	98	99	00	01	02	03	04	05	06	07	08	09	10	11	12	13	14	15	21
NRK1	64	55	51	45	43	41	41	36	37.7	38.1	39.2	40.2	40.7	40.1	39.9	37.6	32.4	31.9	32.5	31.7	31.9	32.4	29.6	31.8	39
NRK2					3	2	3	3	3	3	3	4	4	4	3.6	3.4	3.4	4.1	4.6	5.3	5.3	5.3	4.7	5.2	15
NRK3																	1.9	3.0	3.8	3.9	3.9	3.6	3.4	3.4	
TV 2 Direkte (TV 2)	6	19	24	30	32	31	30	31	31.7	31.4	32.2	29.5	30.0	29.4	30.1	28.9	25.3	22.1	20.5	19.3	19.3	18.9	21.3	18.2	28
TV 2 Zebra																	3.0	3.2	3	2.7	2.3	1.9	2.3	2.3	
TV 2 Nyheter (TV 2 Nyhetskanalen)																			2.1	2.2	2.0	2.2	2.6	2.7	
TV 2 Livsstil (TV 2 Bliss)																				1.4	1.3	1.2	1.2	1.1	
TVNorge	8	8	8	8	7	8	9	9	9.5	10.1	9.6	10.3	9.5	11.0	9.9	9.4	8.4	7.5	7.3	7.9	7.6	7.8	8.1	7.4	15
FEM																	1.5	2.0	2.4	2.1	2.2	2.2	2.3	2.2	
REX (MAX)																				1.7	2.4	2.7	2.8	3.2	
TV3	6	6	6	6	6	6	7	8	7.8	6.7	6.0	6.4	6.4	6.1	6.0	5.4	6.3	6.5	6.2	5.3	4.4	4.5	3.6	3.8	11
TV3+ (V4)																	2.4	3.6	3.7	2.9	2.6	2.4	2.2	2.1	
Discovery Channel																	1.9	1.8	1.6	1.4	1.5	1.3	1.1	1.2	
TLC																				0.9	1.0	1.1	1.2	1.1	
MTV Norway																	0.3	0.3	0.3	0.3	0.3	0.3	0.2	0.1	
National Geographic Channel																	0.9	0.8	0.9	0.8	0.8	0.8	0.7	0.8	

== See also ==
- List of television stations in Norway
