= RiksTV =

Norwegian television distributor

RiksTV AS
- Type: Aksjeselskap
- Industry: Telecommunication
- Founded: 2005
- Headquarters: Oslo, Norway
- Area served: Norway
- Products: Digital terrestrial television
- Number of employees: 47 (2013)
- Parent: TV 2 Group (100%)
- Website: www.rikstv.no

RiksTV is the distributor of pay television in the Norwegian digital terrestrial television network.

Except for NRK1, NRK2, NRK3/NRK Super and the NRK radio channels, all broadcasts in the Norwegian DTT network are encrypted. The channels that are broadcast in the RiksTV packages are selected by RiksTV themselves.

== History ==
=== Pre-launch ===
Some of the initial discussions concerned the availability of free-to-air channels other than the ones from NRK. TV 2 and TVNorge had stated that their channels would be encrypted, although they were free-to-air in the analogue network. This caused Modern Times Group, owners of TV3, to announce the launch of "TV4" that they wanted to be free-to-air. RiksTV were however unwilling to broadcast it free-to-air. Moreover, the new provider would carry TV2 free-to-view until year-end 2009, when the existing license contract expired, effectively becoming a pay-TV channel after that.

The first channels were announced on 12 June 2007, and were TV 2, TVNorge, TV3, TV 2 Zebra, Discovery Channel, Disney Channel, The Voice TV, SportN, TV 2 Filmkanalen, TV 2 Nyhetskanalen, Viasat 4, TVNorge2 (was named FEM the next day), Canal+ Sport 1 and Canal+ Film 1. The radio channels P4, Kanal 24 and Radio 1 were also included.

On 12 June, it was announced that Animal Planet, Canal+ Film 2, the National Geographic Channel, TV 2 Sport and local television would launch later on. It was however announced in July that BBC World would become a part of the RiksTV package and that Animal Planet, Canal+ Film 2 and National Geographic would be a part of the package from the start, thanks to new compression technology.

Among the rejected channels were MTV, Eurosport, SVT1 and SVT2 (these two due to rights issues, as well as low ratings). The fact that MTV was rejected, meant that The Voice TV would be the only music channel on RiksTV. International news channels such as CNN, BBC World and Sky News were also rejected initially, as TV2 Nyhetskanalen first was seen as good enough. Aftenposten criticized the channel selection, especially the exclusion of foreign news channels. The company justified that BBC World and CNN International, as well as the two SVT channels, would be top of their priorities only in 2010, when the service weould go nationwide.

=== Launch ===
RiksTV started its launch on 1 September 2007, in Rogaland County. The lineup from the launch was:

- TV 2
- TVNorge
- TV3
- TV 2 Zebra
- Discovery Channel
- Disney Channel
- The Voice TV
- SportN
- TV 2 Filmkanalen
- TV 2 Nyhetskanalen
- Viasat 4 (launched 8 September)
- FEM (launched 3 September)
- Canal+ Sport 1
- Canal+ Film 1
- Canal+ Film 2
- National Geographic Channel
- Animal Planet
- Euronews

RiksTV was then launched in the remaining counties in this order:

- 4 September 2007: Østfold
- 6 September 2007: Oslo and Akershus
- 1 October 2007: Hordaland
- 8 October 2007: Møre og Romsdal
- 11 October 2007: Buskerud, Vestfold and Telemark
- 1 November 2007: Sør-Trøndelag
- 5 November 2007: Sogn og Fjordane
- 8 November 2007: Hedmark and Oppland
- November 2008: Aust-Agder, Vest-Agder, Nord-Trøndelag, Nordland, Troms and Finnmark

=== Post-launch ===
NRK had done its first tests in 2008 for the 2008 Summer Olympics on the cable and satellite, but noted that it would engage in full-time HD broadcasts only after the expansion of the RiksTV network and when analogue transmitter network was switched off. By February 2009, only 340,000 subscribers had joined, below the initial 500,000 subscriber target. Specilations have also emerged that it was losing ground to the two satellite platforms.

On 25 June 2009, TV 2 upgraded their signal and started broadcasting the entire channel in high-definition.

SportN closed down on 15 September 2009. Its channel space was left empty for two months until 15 November, when it was replaced by Eurosport. In October, eyeing TV 2's conversion to a full-time encrypted channel, competitor Viasat launched a campaign, based on the Italian series La Linea, promoting its cheapest package, which included TV 2, claiming that the service was cheaper on Viasat compared to the largest private channels on RiksTV. Procon noted that the commercial, which directly referred to RiksTV, violated competition regulations. Canal Digital, another competitor, announced that RiksTV had limited HD capacity (one channel versus Canal Digital's eleven). Only selected TV 2 programmes (Skal vi danse? and a weekly football match) aired in HD on the platform. During the early months, only RiksTV had TV 2's HD feed. RiksTV took legal action against Viasat's campaign under the grounds that it was "illegal".

On 10 September 2010, RiksTV announced the first major expansion of its channel lineup with six new channels. The new channels were the Swedish public service channels SVT1 and SVT2 (per what a company spokesman earlier in the year, not every Norwegian with satellite TV received the two channels), the Children's channels Playhouse Disney and Disney XD, the lifestyle channel TLC and the new men's channel MAX. TVNorge also started broadcasting in high-definition. The new channels launched on 14 September, with the exception MAX which starts on 1 November. On 1 November 2012, SVT2 was replaced by BBC Entertainment.

=== As a TV 2 subsidiary (since 2021) ===
In May 2021, NRK sold its half in RiksTV to TV 2, evaluated at NOK 150 million. Now the sole owner, TV 2's aim was to make it a "solid and responsible" owner.

On 6 November 2024, the Viaplay Group channels were going to be suspended from the platform, due to a lack of an agreement between the two companies, this was solved thanks to a last-minute agreement.

== Offer ==
RiksTV has a monopoly in Norwegian terrestrial pay-TV. A substantial amount of channels is available using a conventional antenna, however some channels require internet connection to watch. These limitations are not present on the fiber service.

Linear television channels are mapped to LCNs 1-99, radio stations in the 200s and variations of the NRK channels in the 980s and 990s. Local channels are only available on the terrestrial network.

=== Television channels ===
- Al Jazeera
- Animal Planet
- BBC News
- BBC Nordic
- CNBC
- CNN International
- Discovery Channel
- Discovery Science
- Disney Channel
- DR1
- DR2
- DW-TV
- Euronews
- Eurosport 1
- Eurosport Norge
- Food Network
- FEM
- France 24
- Frikanalen
- Heim TV
- History
- Hits
- Investigation Discovery
- Local television
- Matkanalen
- MTV
- National Geographic
- Naturkanal 1
- Norway Live
- NRK1
- NRK2
- NRK3
- NRK Super
- NRK Tegnspråk
- Nickelodeon
- Nick Jr.
- REX
- Riskoto Direkte
- SF-kanalen
- Sky News
- Stars
- SVT1
- SVT2
- Travel Channel
- TV 2 Direkte
- TV 2 Livsstil
- TV 2 Nyheter
- TV 2 Sport 1
- TV 2 Sport 2
- TV 2 Sport Premium
  (1-2)
- TV 2 Zebra
- TV 2 Denmark
- TV3
- TV3+
- TV4 Sweden
- TV6
- TLC
- TVNorge
- Visjon Norge
- VOX
- V Sport 1
- V Sport 2
- V Sport 3
- V Sport +
- V Sport Golf
- V Sport Premier League
  (1-4)

=== Radio channels ===
- NRK Folkemusikk
- NRK Jazz
- NRK Klassisk
- NRK mP3
- NRK Nyheter
- NRK P1
- NRK P1+
- NRK P2
- NRK P3
- NRK P3 Musikk
- NRK Sámi Radio
- NRK Sport
- NRK Super
- P4 Radio Hele Norge
- Radio Norge

=== On-demand and streaming services ===
- BBC Nordic+
- FilmFavoritter
- HBO Max
- Nordisk Film+
- NRK TV
- NRK Super
- SkyShowtime
- Simpl
- TV 2 Play
- Viaplay

== See also ==
- Norges Televisjon – Operator of the digital terrestrial television network in Norway
