= Dagsnytt =

Norwegian radio program

Dagsnytt (Norwegian: "daily news") is Norwegian public radio's main news programme. It is broadcast on most of NRK radio channels, with 3-minute bulletins every hour, including in the overnight hours. Additional bulletins are broadcast every half-hour on weekdays between 05:30 and 08:30. It has about 2.5 million daily listeners, around half of the Norwegian population.

First broadcast in 1934, Dagsnytt is the oldest and most recognized of all NRK programmes.

The programme is produced by NRK's news division, based at Television House at NRK headquarters at Marienlyst in Oslo.

As of 31 July 2025, the 05:00, 05:30, and 06:00 bulletins on weekdays, and the 06:00 bulletins on weekends, are televised on NRK1, showing the announcer and the radio news studio's tech setup.

== Stations that carry Dagsnytt hourly ==
As of May 2024, the following NRK DAB+ stations and TV channels carry the hourly 3-minute bulletins, sorted in order of how many bulletins they carry (excluding the half-hourly bulletins):

Station	Weekday bulletins	Weekend bulletins
NRK P1	24	
NRK P1+	24	
NRK Klassisk	24	
NRK Jazz	24	
NRK P2	23 (except 18:00, where Dagsnytt 18 is broadcast instead)	24
NRK Sport	Varies (All except when studio or live broadcasts are scheduled)	
NRK P13	7 (06:00 - 10:00, 22:00, and midnight)	
NRK P3	4 (03:00 - 06:00)	
NRK2	3 (05:00 - 07:00)	
NRK Nyheter	2 (07:00, 08:00)	6 (08:00 - 12:00, 14:00)
NRK1, NRK Tegnspråk	2 (05:00, 06:00)	

== See also ==
- Dagsnytt Atten
