= NRK Nyheter (radio station) =

Norwegian news radio station

Coordinates: 59°56′08″N 10°43′08″E

- Available nationwide; Norway
- Broadcast area: Norway
- Frequencies: NRK DAB+ national multiplex RiksTV: Channel 209; Telenor Norway cable/IPTV: Channel 366; Allente Norway: Channel 196

Programming
- Languages: Norwegian Bokmål; English (BBC World Service slots); Norwegian Nynorsk (Occasionally in longer newscasts and Dagsrevyen); Swedish (SR Ekot slots)
- Format: News, talk station
- Network: NRK
- Affiliations: BBC World Service, SR P1, NRK1

Ownership
- Owner: NRK
- Operator: NRK
- Sister stations: NRK P1, NRK P2

History
- First air date: 14 April 1997; 29 years ago
- Former names: NRK Alltid Nyheter
- Former frequencies: Greater Oslo area: 93.0 MHz; Bergen: 93.8 MHz; Trondheim: 94.9 MHz; Stavanger: 93.0 MHz; Sarpsborg-Fredrikstad: 90.7 MHz; Kristiansand: 94.0 MHz; Haugesund: 95.6 MHz; Tønsberg: 97.0 MHz; Porsgrunn: 95.8 MHz; Hamar-Gjøvik: 88.4 MHz; Bodø: 94.8 MHz; Tromsø: 89.8 MHz; Alta: 90.8 MHz; Vadsø: 90.7 MHz

Links
- Webcast: radio.nrk.no/direkte/alltid_nyheter

NRK Nyheter (lit. 'NRK news') is a Norwegian all-news radio channel operated by the Norwegian Broadcasting Corporation (NRK). It was launched on 14 April 1997 (as NRK Alltid nyheter) as part of an effort to attract listeners to DAB digital radio, and was the world's first all-digital news channel.

At the end of August 2018, NRK Alltid nyheter had a weekly reach of 82,000 listeners (an audience share of 1.8%).

In 2021, the station was renamed NRK Nyheter.

== Broadcasting ==
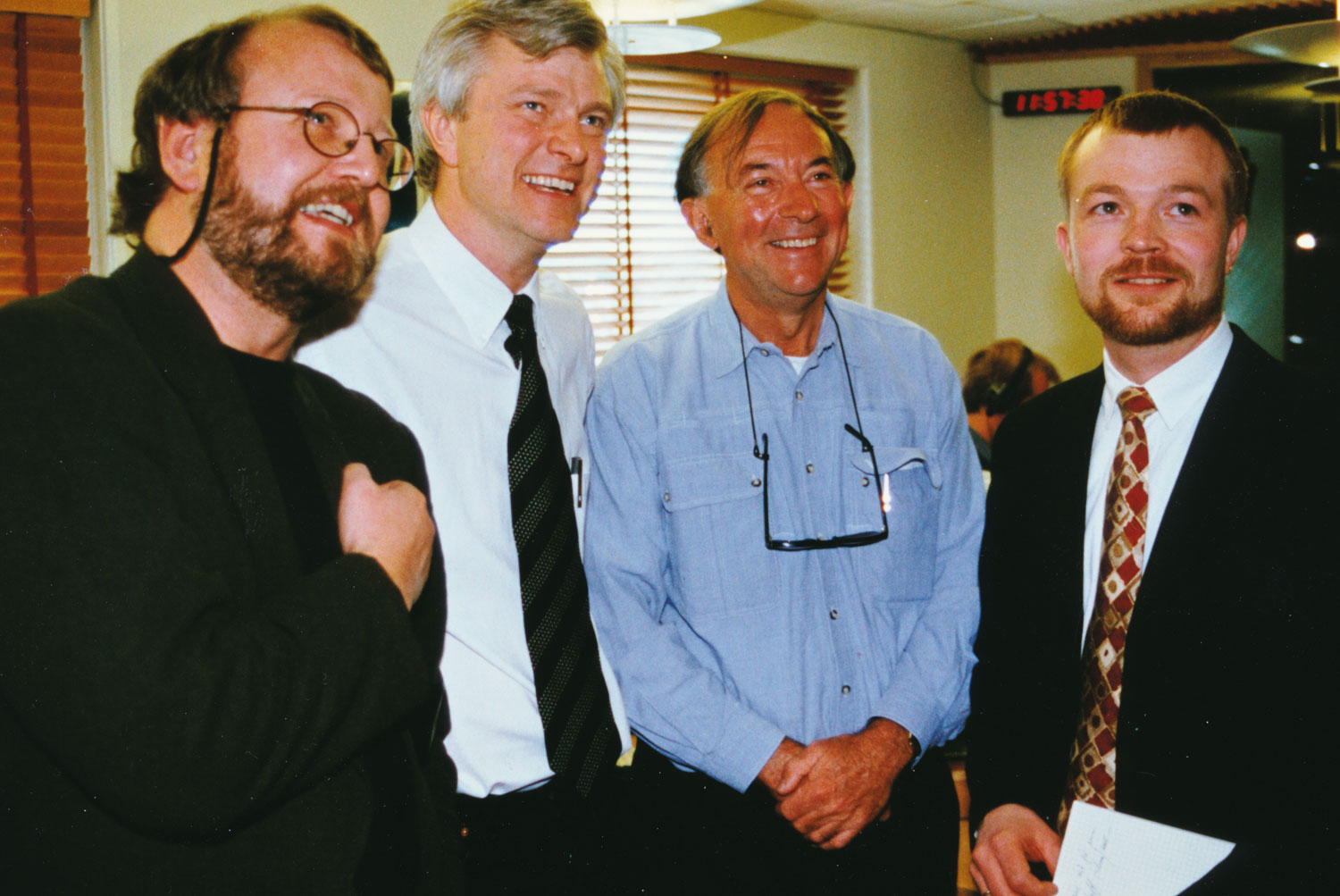
The opening of NRK Alltid Nyheter in Oslo, Norway, on 14 April 1997. From the left: Tor Fuglevik (Radio Director General of NRK), Frode Rekve (Head of Project), Ian Wolfe (the new channel’s Australian “Godfather” and head of ABC NewsRadio in Sydney), and Kjetil Svorkmo Bergmann (Chief Editor of NRK Alltid Nyheter).

Initially the station used the same production model as ABC NewsRadio in Sydney, Australia and broadcast news every fifteen minutes, in a less formal manner than traditional radio. It had its own staff of 16 journalists who created stories based on material provided by NRK's main news division, the BBC World Service, and Sveriges Radio. In 2002 the station moved to NRK's headquarters in Marienlyst, Oslo, where other NRK news output is produced.

Although the channel had been set up with the aim of attracting listeners to DAB, it was later decided that early DAB coverage was too low, and parallel broadcasting on FM was begun in 17 of the largest Norwegian cities and towns. These FM transmissions were withdrawn in line with the planned switch-off of analogue radio in Norway, which started in January 2017, now that DAB+ transmissions can be received by 99.7% of the population. By 13 December 2017 all NRK national stations had transitioned to DAB+ transmissions only. The channel is also available via satellite and online web services.

== Programming ==
As of November 2023, programming on the station included, but was not limited to:

- Simulcasts of NRK P1's Politisk kvarter and Dagsnytt 18.
- Simulcasts of NRK P2's Helgemorgen and Verdibørsen.
- Audio simulcasts of NRK1's Dagsrevyen (but not Kveldsnytt), as well as Nyhetsmorgen and NRK1's often extensive daytime news slots. Starting with the TV division's introduction of synthesized audio description for subtitles in 2015, the simulcasts have used the audio description audio feed.
- Many of the hourly 3-minute Dagsnytt radio newscasts that are shared across the core NRK radio stations.
- Simulcasts of BBC World Service's English-language feed.
- SR P1's Ekot, one 15- or 30-minute slot per day, often aired on one or more hours' delay. Extended from five to seven days a week sometime before 2023.
- Norsken, svensken, og dansken, an all-Scandinavian podcast that has been granted radio airtime.

== Logo history ==
Original logo at launch in 1997.

Logo used from 2011 to 2017

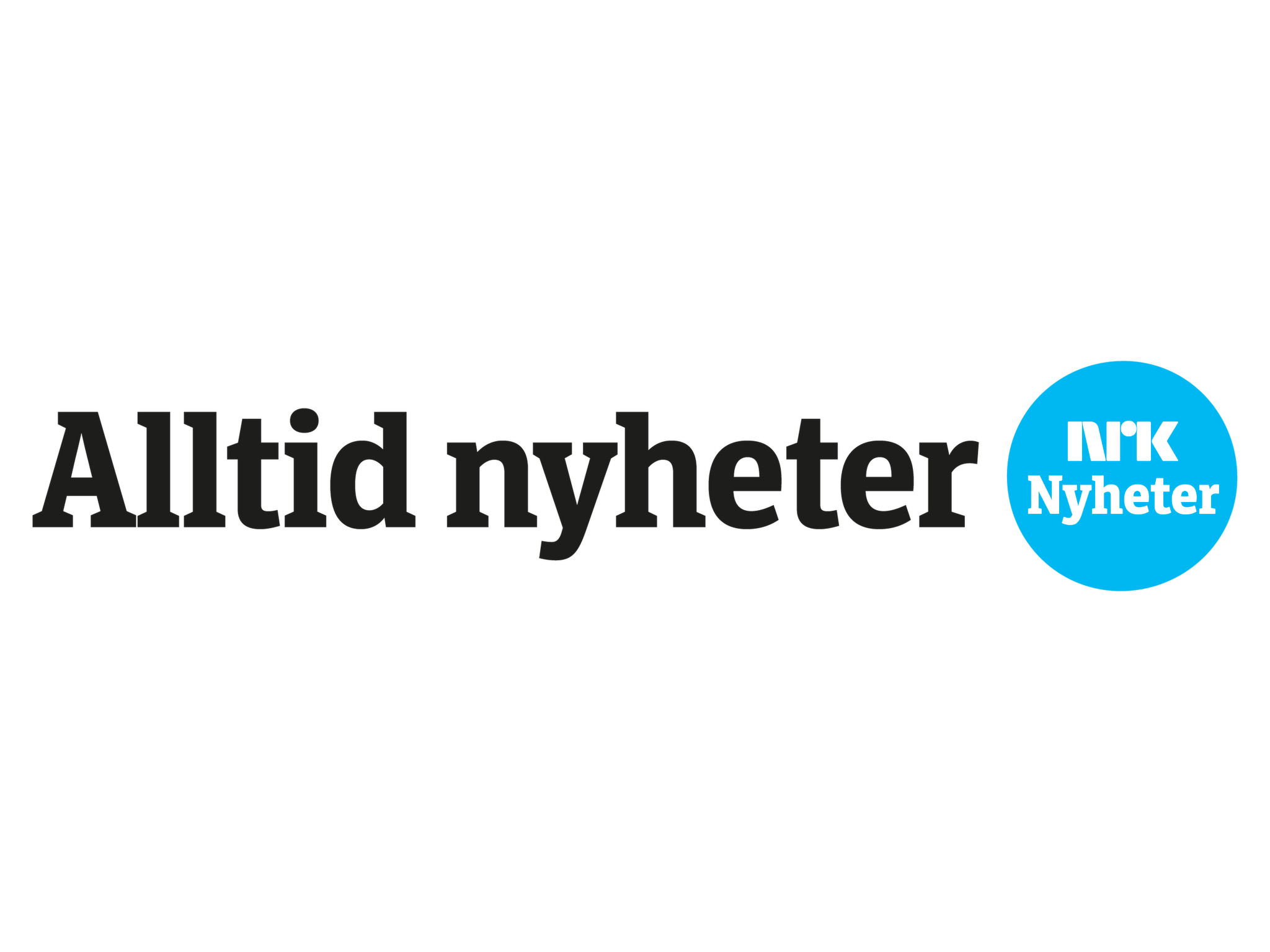
2017 to 2021

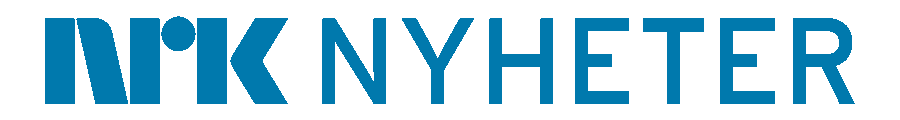
2021 to 2022
