= NRK Tegnspråk =

Norwegian television channel

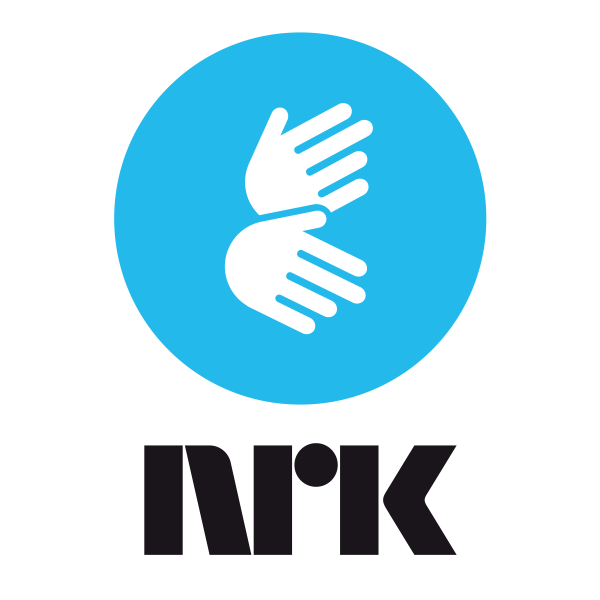
- Country: Norway
- Broadcast area: Norway

Programming
- Language(s): Norwegian Sign Language; Norwegian
- Picture format: 16:9 / 720p (cable and satellite); 16:9 / 576i (RiksTV)

Ownership
- Owner: NRK
- Sister channels: NRK1, NRK2, NRK3, NRK Super

History
- Launched: October 2001

Availability

Terrestrial
- RiksTV: Channel 998

Streaming media
- NRK TV: Watch live (only in EEA)

NRK Tegnspråk is a Norwegian television channel broadcasting signed versions of programs broadcast by NRK1, NRK2, NRK3, and NRK Super.

Starting in 2022-23, the program schedule was increased from circa 4 shows per day, to around 8 to 12 shows per day that were no longer tied to being simulcasts of the other NRK channels (except for the big newscasts, which remain simulcasts). All programmes have their regular audio tracks and hard subtitles alongside the signing. Programming consists mostly of newscasts, children's shows, and documentaries.

A very limited selection of TV2 documentary shows have been aired on NRK Tegnspråk too, which includes TV2 hjelper deg and Tina - Jakten på en drapsmann.

During the channel's downtime, it shows a TV guide with program descriptions, and plays an audio feed of NRK1.

For the week of 19-25 May 2025, among the shows that were broadcast were:

- Dagsrevyen
- Happy the Hoglet
- Fireman Sam
- Dagsnytt (Not signed)
- Karsten og Petra
- Norge rundt
- Fra bølle til bestevenn
- Folkeopplysningen
