= TV 2 Bliss =

- Broadcast area: Norway

Ownership
- Owner: Schibsted ASA, Egmont Holding AS, A-Pressen ASA, A-Pressen TV AS
- Sister channels: TV 2, TV 2 HD, TV 2 Filmkanalen, TV 2 Nyhetskanalen, TV 2 Sport, TV 2 Premier League HD, TV 2 Zebra

History
- Launched: 17 October 2010; 15 years ago
- Closed: 2 November 2015; 10 years ago
- Replaced by: TV 2 Livsstil

Links
- Website: Official website

TV 2 Bliss was a Norwegian television channel designed for a mostly female audience. In November 2015, the channel was replaced by TV 2 Livsstil.

The channel started broadcasting on 17 October 2010, with a launch campaign showing how fun an all-entertainment channel could be, signed by McCann Oslo. Its initial slogan was The channel men envy (Kanalen gutta misunner oss).

During its five years on air, notable shows included the local reality series Sandra usensurert, Linni (with Linni Meister), Keeping Up with the Kardashians and drama series such as Desperate Housewives and Grey's Anatomy. In 2014-2015, the channel's ratings improved, but were behind those of TVNorge's FEM.

== Programs ==
- List of programs broadcast by TV 2 Bliss
