= TV 2 Science Fiction =

Programming
- Picture format: 16:9 (576i, SDTV)

Ownership
- Owner: TV 2 Gruppen
- Sister channels: TV 2, TV 2 HD, TV 2 Filmkanalen, TV 2 Nyhetskanalen, TV 2 Sport

History
- Launched: 24 April 2009
- Closed: 31 December 2011

TV 2 Science Fiction was a Norwegian television channel showing science fiction programs, television series and movies. The channel was run in cooperation with the Swedish channel TV4 Science fiction and was available only as a web-TV channel (on TV 2 Sumo) from April 2009. The channel planned to be available via TV 2's IPTV distributors, but in January 2012, the channel was closed.
