= Lisbeth Skei =

Norwegian news anchor

Lisbeth Skei (born 1957) is a Norwegian news anchor.

She hails from Kongsberg and graduated from the University of Oslo with the cand.polit. degree in 1989, majoring in political science and minoring in economics and public law.

Having already started working in the Norwegian Broadcasting Corporation, she was assigned to the radio division from 1984. She presented NRK Østlandssendingen, then Dagsnytt from 1986. In 1991 she was hired as anchor of Norway's main television news program, Dagsrevyen. She has also presented political debate shows.
