= TV 2 Sport =

TV 2 Sport may refer to:

- TV 2 Sport (Danish TV channel), owned by TV 2 (Denmark)
- TV 2 Sport (Norway), owned by TV 2 (Norway) and Telenor
