= List of programs broadcast by TV 2 Bliss =

List of programs broadcast by TV 2 Bliss.

== 0–9 ==
Original title	Country	Norwegian title	Genre
90210	USA	Beverly Hills 90210	Drama

== A ==
Original title	Country	Norwegian title	Genre
Accidentally on Purpose	USA		Sitcom
The Amazing Race	USA		Reality TV
America's Got Talent	USA		Reality TV
Army Wives	USA	Koneklubben	Drama

== B ==
Original title	Country	Norwegian title	Genre
Baywatch	USA		Drama
Big Brother (Norwegian version)	NOR		Reality TV
Bridalplasty	USA		Reality TV
Brothers & Sisters	USA		Drama
Buffy the Vampire Slayer	USA	Buffy	Supernatural drama

== C ==
Original title	Country	Norwegian title	Genre

== D ==
Original title	Country	Norwegian title	Genre
Dance Moms	USA		Documentary
Desperate Housewives	USA	Frustrerte fruer	Drama
Don't Forget the Lyrics	USA		Game show
The Dr. Oz Show	USA		Talk show

== E ==
Original title	Country	Norwegian title	Genre
Eli Stone	USA		Dramedy
The Ellen DeGeneres Show	USA		Talk show
Entertainment Now	CAN		Entertainment news
Excused	USA		Reality TV

== F ==
Original title	Country	Norwegian title	Genre
Fra Hollywood til Parkveien	NOR		Documentary
Frittgående Hope	NOR		Sketch show

== G ==
Original title	Country	Norwegian title	Genre
Geordie Shore	UK	Festløvene	Reality TV
Glee	USA		Musical dramedy
God kveld, Norge!	NOR		Entertainment news
The Good Wife	USA	Brutte løfter	Drama
Grey's Anatomy	USA		Drama

== H ==
Original title	Country	Norwegian title	Genre
Happy Day	NOR		Makeover
Hollyoaks	UK		Soap opera
Hope Island	USA		Drama

== I ==
Original title	Country	Norwegian title	Genre

== J ==
Original title	Country	Norwegian title	Genre
Jerseylicious	USA	Jersey Babes	Reality TV
Judging Amy	USA		Drama

== K ==
Original title	Country	Norwegian title	Genre
Keeping Up with the Kardashians	USA	Søstrene Kardashian	Documentary
Kourtney and Khloé Take Miami	USA	Kourtney og Khloe i Miami	Documentary

== L ==
Original title	Country	Norwegian title	Genre
Life Unexpected	USA		Drama
Linni	USA		Documentary

== M ==
Original title	Country	Norwegian title	Genre
Made in Chelsea	UK		Documentary
Married to Rock	USA	Rockefruene	Documentary
Medium	USA		Crime drama
My Strange Addiction	USA	Snodig avhengighet	Documentary

== N ==
Original title	Country	Norwegian title	Genre
The New Adventures of Old Christine	USA	Christine	Sitcom
New Girl	USA		Comedy

== O ==
Original title	Country	Norwegian title	Genre
October Road	USA		Drama
Oslogirls	NOR		Documentary

== P ==
Original title	Country	Norwegian title	Genre
Petter og Mari	NOR		Documentary
Pretty Wild	USA		Documentary
Private Practice	USA		Drama

== Q ==
Original title	Country	Norwegian title	Genre

== R ==
Original title	Country	Norwegian title	Genre
Ringer	USA		Drama
Rules of Engagement	USA	Mang slags kjærlighet	Sitcom

== S ==
Original title	Country	Norwegian title	Genre
Samantha Who?	USA	Samantha	Comedy
Secret Lives of Women	USA	Kvinners utrolige dobbeltliv	Documentary
Sex... With Mom and Dad	USA		Documentary
Solsidan	SWE		Comedy
Svigerdatter søkes	NOR		Reality TV

== T ==
Original title	Country	Norwegian title	Genre
The Talk	USA		Talk show

== U ==
Original title	Country	Norwegian title	Genre

== V ==
Original title	Country	Norwegian title	Genre

== W ==
Original title	Country	Norwegian title	Genre
Worst Week	USA	Maks uflaks	

== X ==
Original title	Country	Norwegian title	Genre

== Y ==
Original title	Country	Norwegian title	Genre

== Z ==
Original title	Country	Norwegian title	Genre
