= List of programs broadcast by Max (Norwegian TV channel) =

This is a list of programs broadcast by MAX.

== 0–9 ==
Original title	Country	Norwegian title	Genre
1000 Ways to Die	USA		Docufiction
71 Degrees North	GBR	71 grader nord UK	Reality TV

== A ==
Original title	Country	Norwegian title	Genre
According to Jim	USA		Sitcom
American Pickers	USA	Skattejegerne	Reality TV
American Restoration	USA	Fikserne	Reality TV
Archer	USA		Animation

== B ==
Original title	Country	Norwegian title	Genre
Bar Rescue	USA	Barhjelpen	Reality TV
The Big Bang Theory	USA		Sitcom
Breaking Bad	USA		Drama

== C ==
Original title	Country	Norwegian title	Genre
Conan	USA		Talkshow
Criminal Minds: Suspect Behavior	USA		Crime drama
Criss Angel Mindfreak	USA		Magic
CSI: Miami	USA		Crime drama

== D ==
Original title	Country	Norwegian title	Genre
The Dating Guy	CAN		Animation
Deadliest Warrior	USA		Documentary
Dog the Bounty Hunter	USA	Dusørjegeren	Documentary
Dr. Steve-O	USA		Reality TV

== E ==
Original title	Country	Norwegian title	Genre

== F ==
Original title	Country	Norwegian title	Genre
Fawlty Towers	GBR	Hotell i særklasse	Sitcom
Flashpoint	USA	Spesialstyrken	Drama
Full Throttle Saloon	USA	Øl og kubikk	Documentary

== G ==
Original title	Country	Norwegian title	Genre
Gangs of Oz	AUS	Kriminelle gjenger	Documentary
Gary Unmarried	USA	Lykkelig skilt	Sitcom

== H ==
Original title	Country	Norwegian title	Genre
Hardcore Pawn	USA	Pantelånerne i Detroit	Documentary
Human Target	USA		Action

== I ==
Original title	Country	Norwegian title	Genre
Insider	NOR		Documentary

== J ==
Original title	Country	Norwegian title	Genre

== K ==
Original title	Country	Norwegian title	Genre

== L ==
Original title	Country	Norwegian title	Genre
The Life and Times of Tim	USA		Animation
Live at Gotham	USA		Comedy

== M ==
Original title	Country	Norwegian title	Genre
Mad Men	USA		Documentary
Monster Garage	USA	Monstergarasjen	Documentary
Mr. Bean	GBR		Comedy

== N ==
Original title	Country	Norwegian title	Genre
Nattpatruljen	NOR		Documentary
Nikita	USA		Action

== O ==
Original title	Country	Norwegian title	Genre
Outsourced	USA		Comedy

== P ==
Original title	Country	Norwegian title	Genre
Pawn Stars	USA	Pantelånerne i Las Vegas	Documentary
PokerStars Big Game	USA	Poker: The Big Game	Poker
Police Interceptors	UK	Politiet UK	Documentary

== Q ==
Original title	Country	Norwegian title	Genre

== R ==
Original title	Country	Norwegian title	Genre
Reaper	USA	Djevelens løpegutt	Comedy-drama
Robot Chicken	USA		Animation

== S ==
Original title	Country	Norwegian title	Genre
Scare Tactics	USA	Vettskremt!	Hidden camera
Scrappers	USA	Skraphandlerne i New York	Documentary
$#*! My Dad Says	USA		Sitcom
Sleeper Cell	USA		Action drama
Smallville	USA		Drama
South Beach Tow	USA	Inntauerne på south beach	Reality TV
Spartacus: Blood and Sand	USA		Drama
Speeders	USA	Fartsbøller	Documentary
Spin City	USA		Sitcom
Storage Wars	USA	Lagerkrigen	Reality TV

== T ==
Original title	Country	Norwegian title	Genre
Terminator: The Sarah Connor Chronicles	USA		Science fiction
Top Gear	GBR		Motors
Tosh.0	USA	Galskap.com	Comedy

== U ==
Original title	Country	Norwegian title	Genre

== V ==
Original title	Country	Norwegian title	Genre
V	USA		Science fiction

== W ==
Original title	Country	Norwegian title	Genre
Walker, Texas Ranger	USA		Crime drama
The War at Home	USA		Sitcom

== X ==
Original title	Country	Norwegian title	Genre

== Y ==
Original title	Country	Norwegian title	Genre

== Z ==
Original title	Country	Norwegian title	Genre
