= List of programs broadcast by FEM =

List of programs broadcast by FEM.

== 0-9 ==
Original title	Country	Norwegian title	Genre	IMDb
10 Years Younger	United Kingdom	10 år yngre	Makeover	

== A ==
Original title	Country	Norwegian title	Genre	IMDb
Absolutely Fabulous	United Kingdom	Absolutt fabelaktig	Sitcom	
afterlife	United Kingdom		Paranormal	IMDb
At the End of My Leash	Canada	På Plass!	Educational	IMDb

== B ==
Original title	Country	Norwegian title	Genre	IMDb
Big Love	United States		Drama	IMDb

== C ==
Original title	Country	Norwegian title	Genre	IMDb
Charmed	United States		Supernatural drama	
Chop Shop	Canada		Documentary	
Clean Sweep	United States	Ryddige hjem	Home renovation	
The City Gardener	United Kingdom	Bygartneren	Home renovation	
Cold Case	United States		Police procedural	
Colin and Justin's Home Heist	Canada	Colin & Justin pusser opp	Home renovation	

== D ==
Original title	Country	Norwegian title	Genre	IMDb
DC Cupcakes	United States		Reality TV	
Diagnosis: Murder	United States	Diagnose: Mord	Crime	
The Diet Doctors: Inside & Out	United Kingdom	Rett Diett	Health	
Dirt	United States		Drama	IMDb
Dirty Sexy Money	United States		Drama	
The Doctors	United States	Legene	Health	
Dyrlegedrømmen	Norway		Documentary	

== E ==
Original title	Country	Norwegian title	Genre	IMDb
Entertainment Tonight	United States		Entertainment news	IMDb
Exposed: Life Through a Lens	United States	Zoom	Infotainment	
Extreme Hollywood	United States		Infotainment	IMDb

== F ==
Original title	Country	Norwegian title	Genre	IMDb
Face Off	United States		Reality TV	
Footballers' Wives	United Kingdom	Fotballenkene	Drama	IMDb

== G ==
Original title	Country	Norwegian title	Genre	IMDb
Ghost Whisperer	United States		Paranormal	IMDb
The Graham Norton Show	United Kingdom		Talk show	
Greek	United States	Collegeliv	Comedy-drama	

== H ==
Original title	Country	Norwegian title	Genre	IMDb
Hair Battle Spectacular	United States		Reality TV	
Haunting Evidence	United States	Kalde saker - nye bevis	Paranormal	
Hellcats	United States		Comedy-drama	
Hello Goodbye	Norway		Documentary	
Help, I'm a Teen Mum	United Kingdom		Documentary	
Herlige hjem	Norway		Home renovation	
Hypnoconfessional	United Kingdom	Hypnotiske bekjennelser	Reality TV	

== I ==
Original title	Country	Norwegian title	Genre	IMDb
I Dream of Jeannie	United States		Sitcom	

== J ==
Original title	Country	Norwegian title	Genre	IMDb
Jamie Oliver's Food Revolution	United States		Food	
Jamie's 30 Minutes Meals	United Kingdom		Food	
Jon & Kate Plus 8	United States		Documentary	
Judge Judy	United States		Legal	IMDb

== K ==
Original title	Country	Norwegian title	Genre	IMDb
Kimora: Life in the Fab Lane	United States		Documentary	IMDb

== L ==
Original title	Country	Norwegian title	Genre	IMDb
Lisa Williams: Life Among the Dead	United States	Lisa Williams - Livet blant de døde	Paranormal documentary	IMDb
Lisa Williams live i Oslo	Norway		Paranormal	
The Listener	Canada		Drama	
Little Miss Perfect	United States	Lille frøken perfekt	Documentary	
Living Lohan	United States		Reality TV	

== M ==
Original title	Country	Norwegian title	Genre	IMDb
Martha	United States	The Martha Stewart Show		IMDb
Mary Queen of Shops	United Kingdom	Fra shabby til chic butikk	Home renovation	
Medium	United States		Crime	
Mr. & Mrs. Smith	United States		Comedy drama	IMDb
The Montel Williams Show	United States	Montel	Talkshow	IMDb
Most Haunted	United Kingdom	Det spøker!	Paranormal documentary	IMDb
The Mummy Diaries	United Kingdom	En døende mors dagbok	Documentary	

== N ==
Original title	Country	Norwegian title	Genre	IMDb
Newlywed, Nearly Dead		Hjelp, vi er nygift!	Reality TV	
Notes from the Underbelly	United States	Bolle i ovnen	Comedy	

== O ==
Original title	Country	Norwegian title	Genre	IMDb
One Tree Hill	United States		Drama	
The Only Way Is Essex	United Kingdom		Documentary	

== P ==
Original title	Country	Norwegian title	Genre	IMDb
Pageant Place	United States	Missepalasset	Documentary	IMDb
Pam: Girl on the Loose!	United States	Pamela Anderson usensurert	Reality TV	
Paranormal State	United States		Paranormal	
Party Mamas		Feststemte mammaer	Reality TV	
Project Runway	United States		Reality TV	
Promised Land	United States		Drama	
The Protector	United States		Drama	
Psychic Kids	United States		Paranormal	

== R ==
Original title	Country	Norwegian title	Genre	IMDb
The Rachael Ray Show	United States		Talkshow	
Rain Shadow	Australia	I ly av regnet	Drama	IMDb
Revelations	United States		Drama	IMDb
Ruby	United States	Ruby - Kampen mot kiloene	Documentary	

== S ==
Original title	Country	Norwegian title	Genre	IMDb
Satisfaction	Australia		Drama	
Save Us from Our House	Canada		Home improvement	
The Secret Life of the American Teenager	United States	Mitt hemmelige tenåringsliv	Drama	
Sensing Murder	United States	Fornemmelse for mord USA	Paranormal	
Shedding for the Wedding	United States		Reality TV	
She's Got the Look	United States	Modelljakten 35+	Drama	
Side Order of Life	United States			IMDb
Sixth Sense		Den sjette sans		
Sonny with a Chance	United States	Sonnys sjanse	Sitcom	
Space for Living		Levende rom	Home renovation	
Studio 5	Norway		Talkshow	
Style by Jury	Canada	Motejuryen	Fashion	
Supernatural	United States		Drama	
Switched at Birth	United States		Family drama	

== T ==
Original title	Country	Norwegian title	Genre	IMDb
Tabatha's Salon Takeover	United States	Salong makeover	Reality TV	
Tori & Dean: Inn Love	United States		Documentary	IMDb
Touched by an Angel	United States	En engel iblant oss	Drama	IMDb
Trinny & Susannah Undress...	United Kingdom	Trinny & Susannah	Makeover	
True Beauty	United States		Reality TV	

== U ==
Original title	Country	Norwegian title	Genre	IMDb
Ugly Betty	United States		Dramedy	
Unge mødre	Norway		Documentary	
De Unge Mødre	Denmark	Unge Mødre DK	Documentary	
United States of Tara	United States		Comedy drama	
The Unsellables	United Kingdom	Hjelp, vi får ikke solgt	Home renovation	

== V ==
Original title	Country	Norwegian title	Genre	IMDb
The Vampire Diaries	United States		Drama	

== W ==
Original title	Country	Norwegian title	Genre	IMDb
Wildfire	United States		Drama	IMDb
Wizards of Waverly Place	United States		Sitcom	
The World's Strictest Parents	United States	Verdens strengeste foreldre	Reality TV	

== X ==
Original title	Country	Norwegian title	Genre	IMDb

== Y ==
Original title	Country	Norwegian title	Genre	IMDb
The Young and the Restless	United States		Soap opera	IMDb
You're Wearing That?!?	United States	Makeover: Mor & datter	Makeover	
