= List of programs broadcast by TV3+ Norway =

Norwegian television program

List of programs broadcast by TV3+ Norway.

== 0-9 ==
Original title	Country	Norwegian title	Genre
8 Simple Rules	US		Sitcom
The 4400	US		Science fiction

== A ==
Original title	Country	Norwegian title	Genre
The A-Team	US		Action drama
Aftershock: Earthquake in New York	US		Drama
Afterworld	US		Science fiction
American Dad!	US		Animation
American Gladiators	US		Sports entertainment
Anger Management	US		Sitcom
Ax Men	US		Documentary

== B ==
Original title	Country	Norwegian title	Genre
Banzai	UK		Comedy
Bartenderskolen	NOR		Reality TV
Back to You	USA		Sitcom
The Beast	US		Crime drama
The Boondocks	US		Animation
Breaking the Magician's Code: Magic's Biggest Secrets Finally Revealed	US	Tryllekunstens hemmeligheter	Documentary
Brothers	US		Sitcom
Burn Notice	US		Drama

== C ==
Original title	Country	Norwegian title	Genre
Chase	US		Crime drama
Charmed	US		Drama
Cheers	US		Sitcom
Chef Academy	US		Reality TV
Coach	US		Sitcom
Community	US		Comedy
COPS	US		Documentary
Covert Affairs	US		Action drama
Crash	US		Drama

== D ==
Original title	Country	Norwegian title	Genre
Damages	US		Legal drama
Dark Blue	US		Crime drama
Deadliest Catch	US		Documentary
Dexter	US		Crime drama
Dog Whisperer	US	Hundehviskeren	Reality TV
Dr. Phil	US		Talk-Show
The Drew Carey Show	US	Drew Carey	Sitcom

== E ==
Original title	Country	Norwegian title	Genre
Eleventh Hour	GBR		Drama
Entourage	US		Comedy-drama
The Event	US		Drama
Everybody Loves Raymond	USA	Alle elsker Raymond	Sitcom

== F ==
Original title	Country	Norwegian title	Genre
Family Guy	US	Familien Griffin	Animation
Fear Factor	US		Reality TV
The Fresh Prince of Bel-Air	US		Sitcom
Futurama	US		Animation

== G ==
Original title	Country	Norwegian title	Genre
The Gadget Show	GBR		Documentary
George Lopez	US		Sitcom
Guinness World Records Smashed	US		Contest

== H ==
Original title	Country	Norwegian title	Genre
How I Met Your Mother	US		Sitcom
Hulk Hogan's Celebrity Championship Wrestling	US		Reality TV

== I ==
Original title	Country	Norwegian title	Genre
Ice Road Truckers	US		Documentary
It's Always Sunny in Philadelphia	US		Comedy

== J ==
Original title	Country	Norwegian title	Genre
Jagerpilotene	NOR		Documentary
Journeyman	US		Science fiction
Johnny Bravo	US		Animation
Just Shoot Me!	US	Blush	Sitcom
Justified	US		Drama

== K ==
Original title	Country	Norwegian title	Genre
K-Ville	US		Drama
The King of Queens	US	Kongen av Queens	Sitcom

== L ==
Original title	Country	Norwegian title	Genre
LA Ink	US		Documentary
Landskampen	NOR SWE		Contest
Lassie	US		Drama
Law & Order	US		Crime drama
Leverage	US		Drama
Listen Up	US		Sitcom
Less than Perfect	US	Ikke helt perfekt	Sitcom

== M ==
Original title	Country	Norwegian title	Genre
Mad Men	US		Drama
MADtv	US		Sketch show
Married... with Children	US	Bundy	Sitcom
Married to the Kellys	USA	Gift med Svigers	Sitcom
Memphis Beat	US		Drama-comedy
Moments of Impact	US		Documentary
Most Daring	US		Documentary
Most Shocking	US		Documentary
Murphy Brown	US		Sitcom
MXC	US	MXC: Japansk galskap	Comedy

== N ==
Original title	Country	Norwegian title	Genre
NCIS	US		Police procedural
NCIS: Los Angeles	US		Police procedural
New York Undercover	US		Crime drama
No Signal!	GBR		Sketch show
The North Sea	GBR	Nordsjøliv	Documentary

== O ==
Original title	Country	Norwegian title	Genre
Operation Repo	US		Documentary

== P ==
Original title	Country	Norwegian title	Genre
Politistationen	DEN		Documentary

== Q ==
Original title	Country	Norwegian title	Genre

== R ==
Original title	Country	Norwegian title	Genre
Reality Bites Back	US		Reality TV
Reba	US		Sitcom
Richie Rich	USA		Animated
The Riches	US		Drama
Royal Pains	US		Comedy-drama

== S ==
Original title	Country	Norwegian title	Genre
Saturday Night Live	US		Sketch show
Seinfeld	US		Sitcom
The Simpsons	US		Animation
Stacked	US		Sitcom
Sit Down, Shut Up	US		Animation
Still Standing	US		Sitcom
Spaceballs: The Animated Series	US	Spaceballs	Animation
Spesialenheten	NOR		Crime drama
Star Trek: The Next Generation	US		Science fiction
Stargate Atlantis	US		Science fiction
Stargate Universe	US		Science fiction
Suddenly Susan	US		Sitcom

== T ==
Original title	Country	Norwegian title	Genre
Team Knight Rider	US		Action
The Class	US		Sitcom
True Justice	US		Action drama
Twenty Good Years	US		Sitcom
Two and a Half Men	US		Sitcom

== U ==
Original title	Country	Norwegian title	Genre
Unhitched	US		Comedy
The Unit	US		Drama
The Unusuals	US		Comedy-drama
Urban Legends	CAN		Documentary

== V ==
Original title	Country	Norwegian title	Genre

== W ==
Original title	Country	Norwegian title	Genre
Watching Ellie	US		Sitcom
World's Most Amazing Videos	US	Verdens villeste videoer	Documentary
World's Wildest Police Videos	US	Verdens villeste politivideoer	Documentary

== X ==
Original title	Country	Norwegian title	Genre

== Y ==
Original title	Country	Norwegian title	Genre
Yes, Dear	US	Ja, Kjære	Sitcom
