= NRK Sport =

Norway
- Broadcast area: Norway; Svalbard
- Frequencies: NRK DAB+ national multiplex RiksTV: Channel 215; Telenor Norway cable/IPTV: Channel 375; Allente Norway: Channel 204

Programming
- Languages: Norwegian Bokmål; Norwegian Nynorsk
- Format: Sports radio
- Network: NRK

Ownership
- Owner: NRK
- Sister stations: NRK P1 de facto

History
- Founded: 2 July 2007; 18 years ago

Links
- Webcast: radio.nrk.no/direkte/sport

NRK Sport is a brand name for sports programming produced by the sports department of Norwegian Broadcasting Corporation (NRK). The brand name is used on most national sports broadcasts on television, radio and new media. NRK Sport is produced both in Norway and other countries.

NRK Sport is also a radio station, which broadcasts sports programming via DAB and the internet in Norwegian.

== Programming ==
The station airs live self-produced commentary of sports events of football matches and where NRK does not have the TV rights, and simulcasted audio from NRK1 if NRK do have the TV rights.

As of February 2024, NRK Sport had live broadcasts of, but not limited to:

- UEFA Europa League
- UEFA Conference League
- UEFA Women's Champions League
- Norwegian Football Cup
- Handball national team tournaments
- FIS Cross-Country World Cup (simulcast from NRK1)

Initially and for many years afterwards, the station was only on air during sports broadcasts. Eventually, the station began playing mixed-genre music during the downtime, along with the Dagsnytt hourly NRK short newscasts. Rudimentary score updates from ongoing football matches, e.g. from the English Premier League, are occasionally interspersed into the music.

As of February 2024, two daily broadcasts specific to the channel are broadcast on weekdays:

- Sport i dag ("Sports Today") at 15:00-17:00
- Podkast ("Podcast") at 17:00-18:30
