= FEM (TV channel) =

Norwegian television channel

- Country: United Kingdom
- Broadcast area: Norway

Ownership
- Owner: Warner Bros. Discovery EMEA (Skydance Corporation)
- Sister channels: TVNorge; REX; VOX; Discovery Channel Norge; Eurosport Norge; TLC Norway

History
- Launched: September 3, 2007
- Former names: Nätwerk 5 (1992-2006); TVNorge 2 (2006-2007) (working title)

Links
- Website: Official website

Availability

Terrestrial
- RiksTV: Channel 10

FEM is a Norwegian television channel targeting young women. It broadcasts from London and is the second channel of TVNorge, part of Warner Bros. Discovery EMEA(A division of Skydance Corporation).

FEM was created for the launch of the digital terrestrial television platform RiksTV and started broadcasting on September 3, 2007.

The channel will show series such as Dirt and Big Love as well as original programming.

== Logos ==
FEM first logo from 2007 to 2024

== Programming ==
- List of programs broadcast by FEM
