= Tor Fuglevik =

Norwegian radio and television executive (born 1950)

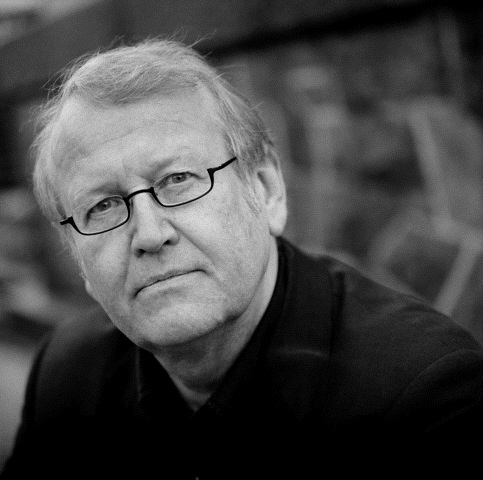
- Tor Fuglevik (Photo: Morten Krogvold, 2010)
- Born: Kristiansand, Norway
- Occupations: Radio and television executive
- Known for: Radio and television executive

Tor Fuglevik (born 7 April 1950) is a Norwegian radio and television executive.

While Director General for Radio at the Norwegian Broadcasting Corporation, Fuglevik founded the very first all-digital radio channel (DAB) in the world. The NRK Klassisk channel, broadcasting classical music 24 hours a day, was launched on 1 June 1995.

Tor Fuglevik holds degrees from the Norwegian School of Journalism in Oslo and the University of Oslo.

He started his career as a radio news reporter for the Norwegian Broadcasting Corporation (NRK) in 1971.

He was appointed Head of Information at the Norwegian Ministry of Justice and the Police in 1976. Fuglevik has since held various positions at NRK, acting as Regional Manager, Radio Director General and Dep. Director General. From 2002 to 2006 he was Director General of Norges Televisjon (NTV), a company set up to establish a national, terrestrial TV network, and since 2006 has served as Director of the Norwegian branch of the international media conglomerate Modern Times Group.

From 2004 to 2010, he was a board member of the Language Council of Norway, which is the consultative body for the Norwegian state and government on language issues.

During his career, Fuglevik has also been a member of various governing bodies within the European Broadcasting Union (EBU) in Geneva.

Fuglevik has published several books about radio and broadcasting. In 2008, Tor Fuglevik received The Honorary Award of Prix Radio for his contribution to the development of Norwegian Radio.
