= TV 2 Filmkanalen =

Programming
- Picture format: 16:9 (576i, SDTV)

Ownership
- Owner: Schibsted ASA, Egmont Holding AS, A-Pressen ASA, A-Pressen TV AS
- Sister channels: TV 2, TV 2 Zebra, TV 2 Nyhetskanalen, TV 2 Sport, TV 2 Science Fiction

History
- Launched: 17 September 2006
- Closed: 2 March 2015

Links
- Website: Official site

Availability

Terrestrial
- RiksTV: Channel 12

TV 2 Filmkanalen was a Norwegian movie channel. The channel broadcast 18 hours a day and showed about 420 movies a year.

The channel was closed on 2 March 2015, at 04.30 am, being replaced with TV 2 Humor which began at 06.00 am the same day. The cause for its closure was the arrival of streaming services, which justified the lack of insisting on a linear film channel in 2015. Movies would still be seen on the group's channels; TV 2 Humor was not seen as a direct replacement.
