= NRK P1+ =

Norwegian radio station

Coordinates: 59°56′08″N 10°43′08″E

- Available nationwide; Norway
- Broadcast area: Norway; Svalbard
- Frequencies: NRK DAB+ national multiplex RiksTV: Channel 211; Allente Norway: Channel 221

Programming
- Language: Norwegian Bokmål

Ownership
- Owner: NRK
- Sister stations: NRK P1

History
- First air date: 2 October 2013; 12 years ago

Links
- Webcast: radio.nrk.no/direkte/p1pluss

NRK P1+ is a radio station, run by Norwegian Broadcasting Corporation (NRK). It is broadcast on DAB and online. The channel has its origin from NRK P1 and is intended for an adult audience. The broadcasts started on 2 October 2013 as part of NRK's digital radio offerings. Program Manager Line Gevelt Andersen led the effort in designing the channel.
