= Disney Channel (Scandinavia) =

Children's television channel in Scandinavia

- Logo used since 22 August 2022
- Country: United Kingdom
- Broadcast area: Denmark; Faroe Islands; Finland; Iceland; Norway; Sweden
- Headquarters: 3 Queen Caroline Street, Hammersmith, London W6 9PE, United Kingdom

Programming
- Language: Swedish; Norwegian; Danish; English; Finnish (subtitles for most TV shows, continuity and bumpers in English); Russian (continuity and bumpers in English) (2012–2023)
- Picture format: HDTV 1080i (downscaled to 576i for the SD feed)

Ownership
- Owner: The Walt Disney Company Limited; Disney Kids & Family (Disney Entertainment)
- Sister channels: Disney Junior (2011–2024); Disney XD (2009–2020); Star Channel Finland; National Geographic; National Geographic Wild

History
- Launched: 28 February 2003; 23 years ago (original); 1 April 2024; 2 years ago (relaunch)
- Replaced: Disney Channel EMEA (original and relaunch); Disney Junior (relaunch)
- Closed: 28 February 2023; 3 years ago (on Allente & the Baltics); 5 June 2023 (all platforms) at 6:00 am (original)
- Replaced by: Disney Channel EMEA (original)

Links
- Website: Swedish Website; Danish Website; Norwegian Website

Availability

Terrestrial
- RiksTV (Norway): Channel 14
- Boxer (Denmark): Channel 25
- Televarpið (Faroe Islands): Channel 18
- Digitalísland (Iceland): Channel 60

Disney Channel is a British-managed Scandinavian children's television channel owned and operated by The Walt Disney Company Limited. On 5 June 2023, it was shut down and merged into Disney Channel EMEA, but was relaunched on 1 April 2024. After the closure of Disney Junior in 2024, Disney Channel is currently the only Disney-branded TV channel in Scandinavia.

== History ==
On 28 February 2003, almost 80 years since the founding of The Walt Disney Company and almost 20 years since the launch of the original Disney Channel in the United States, the Disney Channel was launched, and was at the time exclusive to the Viasat satellite platform (Sirius 4).

Later that year, it became available on digital cable networks, such as the Swedish Com Hem.

In 2003, the channel also applied for a license to broadcast in the Swedish digital terrestrial television network. The Disney Channel was among the channels recommended by the Swedish Radio and TV Authority, and the government granted the Disney Channel a broadcasting license on 29 January 2004. The terrestrial transmissions could start on 15 February via the Boxer TV Access platform. Soon after that, the channel celebrated its first anniversary by dropping encryption for one weekend. On 1 August 2005, the channel became available to subscribers of the Canal Digital (Thor 2) satellite platform. Subsequently, its ratings increased. Simultaneously, a sister channel called Toon Disney was launched. A third sister channel, Playhouse Disney, was launched on 1 October 2006.

In the fall of 2009, the channel started broadcasting its first original productions. Among these are a sitcom called Når klokkerne ringer, produced by the Danish production company Nobody, and the music competition My Camp Rock, produced by Titan Television.

In January 2012, Disney Channel Scandinavia got the same on-air logo and graphics as the UK version of Disney Channel at the time. Later in May 2012, the channel updated to 16:9 (widescreen).

Since 1 August 2012, the channel has been airing advertisements between the shows. In the fall of 2012, the Disney Channels in Sweden, Norway and Denmark split feeds during the commercial breaks so it would be easier to air local advertisements; however, the promos and schedule are the same in the Nordic countries.

In October 2020, Disney Channel closed its regional channels and replaced them with a Nordic-wide version.

On 28 February 2023, Disney Channel ceased broadcasting on Allente, along with the Russian-language audio track. However, it remains in other providers. The same day, the feed ceased broadcasting in the Baltics (Since the addition of the Baltic satellite service Viasat in 2003) and was replaced by the EMEA feed of Disney Channel, on 3 April as Home3, satellite service.

On 5 June 2023 the channel was fully disconnected and it was merged into the Pan-European version.

In February 2024, it was announced that the channel would be relaunched on 1 April 2024 and would also include a Disney Junior branded block during mornings and at weekends as the channel merges with the main one.

== Programming ==
The channel is mainly aimed at children, broadcasting Disney television series 24 hours daily. Disney feature films are also an important part of the channel's programming. All of the programs are dubbed into local languages. Since autumn 2012, Disney Channel broadcast with different video streams between the countries with its audio stream, but schedule is still the same. Many syndicated programs have been aired on Disney Channel, such as The Fairly OddParents and Scaredy Squirrel.

== Former sister channels ==
=== Disney Junior ===
Disney Junior was a channel aimed at preschoolers which was launched in October 2006 on the Canal Digital and Viasat satellite operators as Playhouse Disney. Later on, the channel was launched on cable operators. On Com Hem, the largest cable operator in Sweden, the channel was launched on 2 April 2007. On 10 September 2011, Playhouse Disney was rebranded as Disney Junior. The channel closed on 1 March 2024 in Denmark and on 1 April 2024 in other Scandinavian countries and has merged with the main channel.

=== Disney XD ===
Disney XD was a male-skewed children's channel which broadcast 16 hours a day between 6:00 AM CET and 10:00 PM CET. It replaced Jetix and Toon Disney on 12 September 2009. Jetix used to end its daily broadcasts at 6:00 PM. Disney XD is funded by advertising, as was Jetix, while Toon Disney was commercial-free. It closed down on 31 December 2020.

== Logos ==
2003–2012

2012–2014

2014–2017

2017–2022

2022–2023; 2024–present
