= Thane Direct =

British home shopping television channel

- Country: United Kingdom and Ireland

Programming
- Picture format: 576i

Ownership
- Owner: Thane UK; Thane International, Inc.

History
- Launched: 19 March 2002; 23 years ago
- Closed: 5 January 2023; 2 years ago

Links
- Website: thanedirect.co.uk

Thane Direct was a home shopping infomercials television channel, airing over Sky in the United Kingdom and Ireland. The channel exclusively offered half-hour paid advertisements from direct marketing company Thane International, along with extended information through its website. It aired through Sky and Freesat, though by its end it only aired on Sky, and wound down on 5 January 2023; Thane continues to offer teleshopping programmes throughout the industry and online otherwise.
