= NRK P2 =

Norwegian radio station

- Available nationwide; Norway
- Broadcast area: Norway; Svalbard
- Frequencies: NRK DAB+ national multiplex RiksTV: Channel 201; Telenor Norway cable/IPTV: Channel 361; Allente Norway: Channel 191

Programming
- Languages: Norwegian Bokmål; Norwegian Nynorsk
- Format: Culture, news
- Network: NRK

Ownership
- Owner: NRK

History
- First air date: 2 October 1993; 32 years ago

Links
- Webcast: radio.nrk.no/direkte/p2

NRK P2 is one of three main, nationwide radio channels produced by the Norwegian Broadcasting Corporation (NRK). Its current format – focusing on news and current affairs, debate, analysis, culture, science, and society – is the result of the NRK radio channel reform initiated in 1993 by radio director Tor Fuglevik.

In style and content, the channel is similar to the Danish DR P1 and the Swedish SR P1. The original P2, established as NRK's second radio channel in 1984, had carried lighter programming.

The last transmitters radiating P2 on FM were switched off on 13 December 2017, and the channel is now receivable only via digital audio broadcasting (DAB+), satellite TV, and internet.

== Awards ==
In 1999 the channel's employees were collectively awarded the Fritt Ord Award for their championship of freedom of speech.

== Local programming ==
Though it was not considered an official named opt-out (in contrast to those of NRK P1), the FM signals for NRK P2 in most of northern Norway north of Bodø from 2004 to 2017 included programming from NRK Sápmi Radio, and a short weekly or bi-weekly newscast in Finnish and Kven. The DAB+ signals in the same areas did not have these opt-outs, and had the same schedule as the rest of Norway.

The opt-out feed ceased to exist when the FM transmitters in Troms and Finnmark were shut down on 13 December 2017, which also spelled the end of Kven or Finnish timeslots on any NRK radio station, with the final Finnish newscast being on 6 December 2017.

== Notable programming ==
- Dagsnytt
- Dagsnytt 18
- Urix (Radio-specific episodes)
- Abels tårn

== Station managers ==
- 2009–present: Ole Jan Larsen
- 2005–2009: Herborg Bryn
- 1999–2005: Kari Storsletten
- 1995–1999: Bjarne Grevsgard
- 1991–1995: Carl Henrik Grøndahl
- 1984–1991: Arne Bonde

== Logo history ==
2000 to 2007.

2007 to 2011.

October 2011 to December 2022

Awards
Preceded by Alexander Nikitin	Recipient of the Fritt Ord Award; 1999	Succeeded by Thomas Chr. Wyller
