= Rex (Norwegian TV channel) =

Norwegian television channel

- Country: United Kingdom
- Broadcast area: Norway

Ownership
- Owner: Warner Bros. Discovery EMEA (Skydance Corporation)
- Sister channels: TVNorge; FEM; VOX; Discovery Channel Norge; Eurosport Norge; TLC Norway

History
- Launched: November 1, 2010; 15 years ago
- Former names: Max (2010-2024)

Links
- Website: Official website

Rex is a Norwegian television channel designed for a mostly male audience.

The first program on Max was the movie Wild Hogs, followed by the premiere of Breaking Bad. The first week was watched by over 1 million viewers, making it the most successful launch of a Norwegian television channel since TV 2 in 1992.

In November 2010 Max bought the rights to Tippeligaen from NRK.

The channel changed its name from Max to Rex on 19 March 2024, in anticipation for the launch of the Max streaming service in Norway. There were no changes to the type of content shown.

== Logos ==
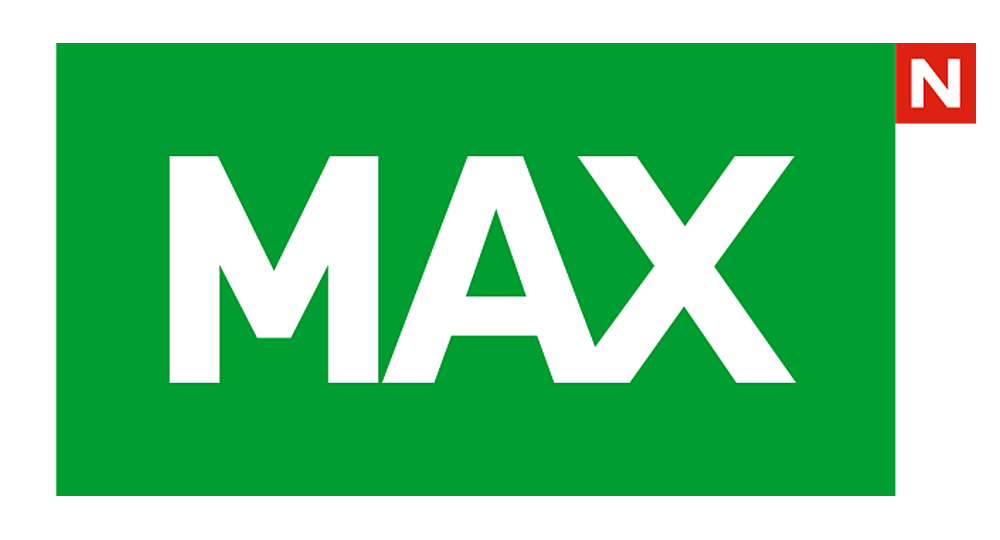
MAX first logo from 2010 to 2024

== Programs ==
- List of programs broadcast by MAX

== Sports ==
- Extreme sports
  - Dew Tour
  - X Games
- Football
  - Tippeligaen
- MMA
  - Bellator Fighting Championships
