= NRK Klassisk =

Norwegian classical music radio station

Coordinates: 59°56′08″N 10°43′08″E

- The logo of NRK Klassisk since 2023.
- Available nationwide; Norway
- Broadcast area: Norway; Svalbard
- Frequencies: NRK DAB+ national multiplex RiksTV: Channel 214; Telenor Norway cable/IPTV: Channel 367; Allente Norway: Channel 197

Programming
- Language: Norwegian
- Format: Classical music
- Network: NRK

Ownership
- Owner: NRK

History
- Founded: 1 May 1995; 31 years ago

Links
- Webcast: https://radio.nrk.no/direkte/klassisk

NRK Klassisk is a digital radio channel operated by the Norwegian Broadcasting Corporation (NRK) which broadcasts classical music 24 hours a day, only interspersed by NRK's hourly 3-minute Dagsnytt newscasts.

== History ==
Short video showing how the BMS software works. NRK Klassisk presenter Anders Fagerjord searches for a recording, and adds it to the playlist. Then, the jukebox loads the CD and starts playback. The video was recorded in 1998.

NRK Klassisk (originally "NRK Alltid Klassisk") was launched in Oslo on 1 June 1995 as the world's first all-digital radio station (DAB), broadcasting 24 hours a day. The BBC and Sveriges Radio, which launched their first digital radio stations in September 1995, caused NRK to bring forward its plans, so as to be the first in the world to use the DAB radio standard (Eureka 147).

Right from the start, the channel was in operation 24 hours a day with a staff of six, in a totally digital programme chain from production via DAB transmitter to receiver.

For broadcasting, the channel used the software BMS (Broadcast Media Server) from the Swedish company BCC. BMS made it possible to prerecord announcements through a digital mixer, together with jingles and background atmosphere, on the computer hard disk and to manage playback together with music recordings from CD and digital audio tape (DAT). The CDs were stored in jukeboxes that held 360 each. Each jukebox had two players, and when fully developed, NRK Klassisk had ten such jukeboxes.

On 30 June 2009, NRK Alltid Klassisk closed its FM network and became digital-only.

== Present operation ==
NRK Klassisk staff broadcast morning programmes live. For the rest of the day and night, the system is programmed in shifts, so that the playlists are broadcast automatically. During holidays like Christmas and Easter, the broadcast of automatic playlists can go on for several days. The station transmits at 80k/bits DAB+ on regional DAB networks.
