= Nyhetskanalen =

Norwegian television channel

Nyhetskanalen was a Norwegian news channel started by A-Pressen. The channel was first broadcast on 18 August 1997 and ceased operations on 30 January 1998. It was only available in and around Oslo.
