= Radio 1 (Norway) =

Norwegian radio network

Radio 1 is a radio network in Norway. It broadcasts programmes on FM Oslo, Bergen and Trondheim and on DAB nationally. It is operated by Bauer Media AS. It targets a relatively young and trendy audience.
