= Animal Planet Nordic =

Pay television channel

- Broadcast area: Denmark, Sweden, Norway, Faroe Islands, Finland

Programming
- Languages: Danish, Norwegian, Swedish, Finnish

Ownership
- Owner: Warner Bros. Discovery EMEA

History
- Launched: 1997; 28 years ago

Availability

Terrestrial
- Boxer (Sweden): Channel 20
- dna Welho (Finland): Channel 85
- Televarpið (Faroe Islands): Channel 21

Animal Planet Nordic is a television channel broadcasting nature-related documentaries to the Nordic countries.

== History ==
Animal Planet was launched in the Nordic region in 1997. In 2001, the channel received a license to broadcast in the digital terrestrial network in Sweden. By 2008, the channel had regularly been one of the twenty most watched channels in Sweden for a few years. From 2007, the channel is also broadcast terrestrially in Norway via the RiksTV package.

For its first ten years in existence, the channel used a logo with a globe and an elephant which was also used by its sister channels. On 1 October 2008 the channel switched a new logo, which had previously been adopted by Animal Planet in the United States.

A high-definition version of the channel, called Animal Planet HD, was launched on 3 February 2009. That made the Nordic region the first region to get a high-definition version of Animal Planet after the United States. The high-definition channel used to have a separate schedule in order to broadcast only high-definition programmes.

Animal Planet Nordic has been replaced by the pan-European feed. The commercials on Animal Planet Europe show three air times depending on the country you live in. The Eastern European time zone is marked with "Suomi" for Finnish viewers.

== Programs ==
Programs shown on the channel include:

- Animal Cops: Houston
- Animal Cops: Philadelphia
- Animal Cops: Phoenix
- Animal Crackers
- Big Cat Diary
- Meerkat Manor
- Monkey Life
- Natural World
- Orangutan Island
- The Planet's Funniest Animals
- Untamed & Uncut
- Wildlife SOS
- Wild Europe
- Up Close and Dangerous
