= TV 2 Group =

Norwegian media company

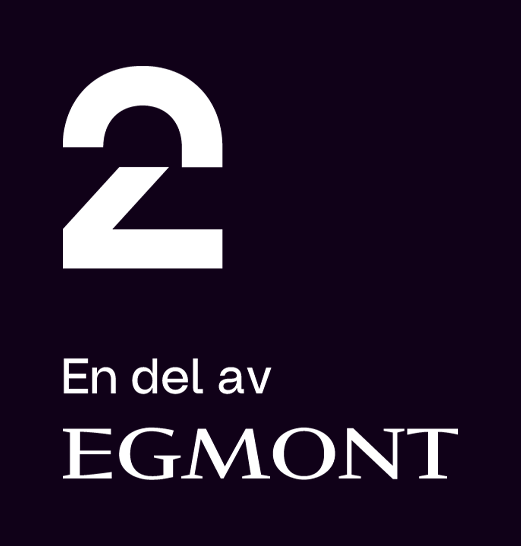
- Type: Joint stock company
- Industry: Media
- Founded: 13 November 1991
- Headquarters: Bergen, Norway
- Key people: Hans Jacob Carstensen
- Products: TV 2
- Revenue: 2.7 billion kr (2008)
- Owner: Egmont Group
- Number of employees: 830 (2008)
- Website: TV 2

TV 2 Group (Norwegian: TV 2 Gruppen) is Norway's largest commercial and public media company. TV 2 Group provides services for TV, Teletext, radio, Internet, web TV, IPTV, mobile telephones and other information formats.

== Services ==
=== TV channels ===
- TV 2 Direkte (Note: Previously known as simply TV 2.)
- TV 2 Zebra (Note: Was known as TV 2 Xtra at launch.)
- TV 2 Livsstil (Note: Converted from TV 2 Bliss.)
- TV 2 Nyheter (Note: Previously known as TV 2 Nyhetskanalen.)
- TV 2 Sport 1 (Note: Previously known as TV 2 Sportskanalen.)
- TV 2 Sport 2
- TV 2 Sport Premium 1 (Note: Converted from TV 2 Premier League after they lost the Norwegian rights to Viaplay Group.)
- TV 2 Sport Premium 2

==== Programming blocks only ====
- Oiii (Note: Previously known as TV 2 Junior.)

==== Discontinued ====
- TV 2 Filmkanalen
- TV 2 Science Fiction
- TV 2 Humor (Note: Its targeted content was merged into TV 2 and TV 2 Zebra.)
- TV 2 3D (Note: Only lasted a few days in early October 2011 before being shut down, with only one scheduled program being aired, which was Norway v Cyprus in the Euro 2012 qualifiers.)

=== Other ===
- TV 2 Play (Paid streaming service) (Note: Previously known as TV 2 Sumo.)
- TV2.no (Free of charge newssite)
- TV 2 Skole (Paid service for educational institutions, as a co-provider for the Elevkanalen online service)

==== Previous ====
- Radio Norge (TV 2 Group was an investor from the start in 2004, acquired full ownership in 2006, and then sold all their stakes to SBS Group in 2008).
