= TV3 (Norwegian TV channel) =

- Country: Norway
- Broadcast area: Norway
- Headquarters: Oslo, Norway

Ownership
- Owner: Viaplay Group
- Sister channels: TV3+ TV6; V Film; V Series; V Sport

History
- Launched: 30 September 1990

Links
- Website: http://www.tv3.no

Availability

Terrestrial
- RiksTV: Channel 5

TV3 is a commercial television channel targeting Norway owned by Viaplay Group. It was separated from the earlier Pan-Scandinavian version in 1990.

Unlike its main rivals, NRK, TV 2 and TVNorge, the channel does not broadcast from Norway but from West Drayton, Middlesex in the United Kingdom, even if the channel is almost solely aimed at Norwegian viewers. This excludes the channel from the strict rules in Norway that apply to advertising (ban on advertisements aimed at children or interrupting programs). Also unlike the other main channels, it wasn't available on analogue terrestrial, having to rely on satellite and cable television for its distribution. With the launch of digital terrestrial television in October 2007, the channel became available terrestrially.

On 3 August 2009 TV3 launched a new visual identity and a new logo. The new visual identity mostly uses purple colour. The identity had rolled out to Denmark and Hungary, as TV3 Norway was the first to use it.

On 1 August 2011 TV3 launched a new visual identity and a new logo, which used mostly yellow colour.

== Sports ==
TV3 had sports on their schedule before they moved all their sports programming to their sister channel Viasat4.

=== Former sports programs ===
- Serie A
- Formula One
- SAS Ligaen
- UEFA Champions League
- Norway national football team away games
- Motorsports
- Boxing
- Handball
- Sailing

== Logos ==
TV3 logo used 2009-2011

== See also ==
- Television in Norway
