= NRK P1 =

Coordinates: 63°25′24″N 10°25′54″E

- Oslo; Trondheim; Norway
- Broadcast area: Norway; Svalbard
- Frequencies: NRK DAB+ national multiplex Svalbard AM: 1485 kHz; RiksTV: Channel 200; Telenor Norway cable/IPTV: Channels 360 and 380-394; Allente Norway: Channels 190 and 230-243

Programming
- Languages: Norwegian Bokmål; Norwegian Nynorsk
- Format: Generalist

Ownership
- Owner: NRK
- Sister stations: NRK P1+

History
- First air date: 2 October 1993; 32 years ago
- Former names: Radio (in programme guides prior to NRK P2 being founded)

Technical information
- Power: 3000W (AM)

Links
- Webcast: radio.nrk.no/direkte/p1

NRK P1 is a nationwide digital radio channel operated by the Norwegian Broadcasting Corporation (NRK). It is the result of the NRK radio channel reform initiated in 1993 by radio director Tor Fuglevik.

NRK P1 is the direct descendant of NRK's first radio station which began broadcasting in 1933. P1's programming is aimed at a broad mature demographic and it is Norway's most popular radio station, with approximately 1.9 million listeners daily.

NRK P1 is considered the country's emergency channel and has responsibility for broadcasting emergency messages and information provided by the authorities via DAB radio.

== History ==
The radio channel is NRK's first broadcast channel and has its origins back to 1925 when the private Kringkastingsselskapet A/S started regular radio broadcasts. Eventually, the state nationalized the private broadcasters and established Norsk Rikskringkasting (NRK) in 1933. Thus the channel continued as the only nationwide broadcasting channel until NRK Television started regular broadcasts in 1960.

With its long-standing monopoly, P1 has been important in Norway's broadcasting and cultural history, with well-known voices such as Alf Prøysen and Anne-Cath Vestly in Barnetimen, Otto Nilsen and Johan Borgen in Søndagsposten, Erik Bye, Rolf Kirkvaag and Halfdan Hegtun.

P1 was NRK's only national radio channel until 1 September 1984, when NRK P2 started broadcasting as an entertainment channel. In 1993, NRK's radio offering was reorganized into three national radio channels under the leadership of radio director Tor Fuglevik. P1 was then tasked with broadcasting programs for the broad, adult strata of the population, with a high proportion of popular music in lighter entertainment and current affairs programs and sports broadcasts. NRK's district broadcasts were also retained in the new P1. In comparison, P2 became the culture channel, while P3 became the youth channel.

The administration of the channel as well as many of the newsrooms and broadcast studios were later moved to NRK's center at Tyholt in Trondheim.

=== Logos History ===
Logo of NRK P1 from 2000 to 2007.

Logo of NRK P1 from 2007 to 2011.

Logo of NRK P1 from October 2011 to December 2022

== Broadcasting ==
P1's headquarters are located in the Tyholt area of Trondheim and most of its programmes are made there, except for news broadcasts which are produced, together with some other programming, at Broadcasting House in Marienlyst, Oslo.

With its 1,176 FM transmitters using 124 different frequencies, NRK P1 had the largest radio network in Europe. However, all NRK's radio stations were gradually digitised during 2017 and are now transmitted via DAB+ and internet. The DAB+ signals are available nationwide, in the Longyearbyen area on Svalbard, and in border villages very close to the Norwegian borders.

NRK P1 also formerly transmitted in longwave at 153 kHz via the Ingøy radio transmitter (opened in 2000, closed 2 December 2019 12:06 AM CET), which served the country's fishing fleet in the Barents Sea. A mediumwave transmitter at Skjæringa, Svalbard remains active as of November 2023.

== Local programming ==
The channel's schedules include around 24.5 hours of local programming each week, produced by the following regional centres:

- P1 Buskerud
- P1 Finnmark
- P1 Hordaland
- P1 Innlandet (Note: Previously P1 Hedmark & Oppland.)
- P1 Møre og Romsdal
- P1 Nordland
- P1 Stor-Oslo (Note: Previously P1 Østlandssendingen, and before that P1 Oslo og Akershus.)
- P1 Rogaland
- P1 Sogn og Fjordane
- P1 Sørlandet
- P1 Telemark
- P1 Troms (Note: Also used as the opt-out on Svalbard.)
- P1 Trøndelag
- P1 Vestfold
- P1 Østfold

The regional opt-outs were largely unaffected by the frequent changes in Norwegian county borders and numbers in the late 2010s and early 2020s.

For the most part, the opt-outs are spread throughout the weekdays and consist of local news, chatter between presenters, and music, but on special occasions the opt-outs can receive extra timeslots. For instance, Brann's home matches against F.C. Arouca and AZ Alkmaar in the 2023-24 UEFA Europa Conference League qualifiers were simulcast on P1 Hordaland and NRK Sport.
