= TV3+ (Norwegian TV channel) =

Norwegian television channel

TV3+ Norway
- Country: United Kingdom
- Broadcast area: Norway

Ownership
- Owner: Viaplay Group
- Sister channels: TV3, TV6, V Film, V Series, V Sport

History
- Launched: 8. September 2007, 18:00
- Replaced: ZTV
- Former names: Viasat Plus (2000-2001), ZTV Norway (2002-2007), Viasat 4 (2007-2020), V4 (2020-2022)

Links
- Website: Official website

Availability

Terrestrial
- RiksTV: Channel 9

TV3+ Norway (formerly V4, Viasat4, ZTV Norway and Viasat Plus) is a television channel broadcasting to Norway owned by the Viaplay Group. The channel was launched on 8. September 2007 replacing ZTV Norway on cable, satellite and terrestrial in preparation for the launch of the digital terrestrial television network in Norway which launched in 2009 and after ZTV was declining in viewers. Viasat 4 took over all of TV3 football segments which have been broadcast there since 1988.

The channel opened with the European Championship qualifying match between Moldova and Norway. Its main focus is on entertainment, sports and documentaries, transmitting series such as Most Shocking, Stargate Atlantis, The 4400, Star Trek, The Simpsons, Family Guy, The Riches, UEFA Champions League matches and Futurama, with short news bulletins from P4 on weeknights. Viasat 4 also transmits several comedy series, such as Cheers, Married... with Children and 8 Simple Rules. On 29 October 2010, the P4 news updates were removed as TV4 aimed to invest in more Norwegian content.

TV3+ was originally to be named TV4, but after complaints from Swedish TV4 AB at the Patent Office, the channel was renamed 4 before becoming Viasat 4.

The original intention was that the channel would broadcast free-to-air via RiksTV. The operator of the commercial muxes was, however, intending to broadcast pay television, so the channel would be a part of the encrypted RiksTV package.

In 2010, Viasat 4 showed 16 World Cup matches from South Africa, including the bronze final between Germany and Uruguay. Viasat obtained the rights from NRK.

The name of the channel was changed from Viasat 4 to V4 in June 2020 as part of an overall rebranding of Viasat TV channels, and to TV3+ Norway in August 2022 to emphasize its connection with TV3 Norway.

== Programming ==
List of programs broadcast by TV3+
