= TVNorge =

Norwegian television station

- Country: Norway
- Broadcast area: Norway

Programming
- Picture format: 1080i HDTV

Ownership
- Owner: Warner Bros. Discovery EMEA (Skydance Corporation)
- Sister channels: FEM; REX; VOX; Discovery Channel Norge; Eurosport Norge; TLC Norway

History
- Launched: 5 December 1988

Links
- Website: Discoveryplus.com/tvnorge

TVNorge (literally "TVNorway"; originally abbreviated TVN, now just abbreviated N in the logos) is a Norwegian television channel owned by Warner Bros. Discovery EMEA, a division of Skydance Corporation.

== History ==
TVNorge went on the air on 5 December 1988 and was the first advertising-supported Norwegian channel. The channel was started with 50,000 NOK. The first broadcast was a live variety show from Oslo Cabaret with Swedish singer Lill-Babs and Norwegian pop group Tomboy as musical guests. Originally TVNorge broadcast via satellite and cable, later they have affiliated several local television broadcasters. The local broadcasters generally were allowed the 17:30–18:30 time slot for local programming, along with a second slot from 19:30–20:30. The rest of the time was assigned to TVNorge's own schedule.

The channel was styled as TVN until 1995, following a rebrand that year, it became TVNorge.

TVNorge became successful early on, before the launch of TV 2, owing to the success of game shows like Casino and Starshot.

In March 2003, Novell sued TVNorge at The Court of Enforcement (Namsretten) and asked for a temporary injunction against TVNorge as they found the logo (unveiled 3 March) too similar to their own; the company also demanded the channel to remove the logo. Novell did not seem to proceed to a full court case after losing their case there and had to pay NOK 110,000 in judicial costs to the network.

When the last analogue terrestrial television transmitter closed in December 2009, the agreement with the local broadcasters and TVNorge ended. TVNorge now broadcasts via private cable and satellite providers in addition to RiksTV, which is the Norwegian digital terrestrial television distributor.

TVNorge and the rest of the SBS Broadcasting group was wholly owned by ProSiebenSat.1 Media AG, but was sold to Discovery Communications on 14 December 2012.

In 2013, the variety group Ylvis created a promo music video for their program on TVNorge entitled The Fox, which became a surprise internet hit and brought international attention to the channel.

As of 2018, TVNorge is also involved in broadcasting the Olympic Games alongside sister network Eurosport.

The channel rebranded on 15 January 2024 as part of a standardisation plan from Warner Bros. Discovery to reface 14 channels in the region.

== High definition ==
TVNorge launched Norway's first High Definition simulcast on their main channel on 3 October 2008, and starting in 2009 TVNorge broadcast own productions in HD. The first episodes shown in HD was the HBO series Rome, and the channel has included several other imported series like CSI, CSI: Miami, CSI: NY and The Big Bang Theory. The HD station has the same schedule as the SD station. Broadcasts not available in high definition are broadcast in standard definition.

== Logos ==
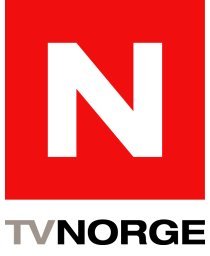
TV Norge fourth logo from 2003 to 2024

== See also ==
- List of Norwegian television channels
- List of programs broadcast by TVNorge
- TVNorge HD
