= TLC Norway =

Norwegian television channel

- Country: United Kingdom
- Broadcast area: Norway

Ownership
- Owner: Warner Bros. Discovery EMEA (Skydance Corporation)
- Sister channels: Discovery Channel

History
- Launched: March 4, 2010; 16 years ago
- Replaced: Discovery Travel & Living Europe

Links
- Website: tlcnorge.no

TLC is a Norwegian television channel. Its primary target is women between 25 and 49. The channel launched on March 4, 2010 and replaced Discovery Travel & Living Europe.
