= National Geographic (Scandinavian TV channel) =

- Broadcast area: Sweden; Denmark; Norway; Finland; Faroe Islands; Greenland; Estonia

Programming
- Picture format: 576i (SDTV), 1080i (HDTV)

Ownership
- Owner: The Walt Disney Company Nordic (Walt Disney Direct-to-Consumer & International)

History
- Launched: September 1997

Links
- Website: https://www.natgeotv.com/se; https://www.natgeotv.com/no

Availability

Terrestrial
- Boxer (Sweden): Channel 66 (HD)
- RiksTV (Norway): Channel 17
- Televarpið (Faeroe Islands): Channel 189
- Digital terrestrial (Finland): Channel 20

National Geographic Channel is a Nordic free-to-air television channel broadcasting documentaries and related programmes to the Nordic countries.

The National Geographic was launched in Scandinavia in September 1997 when BSkyB launched the Sky News & Documentaries channel, carrying National Geographic between 8 p.m. and 2 p.m. (CET) with The Computer Channel between 6 and 8 p.m. and Sky News the remaining time. The broadcasting hours has since then been extended and as of 2006 the channel is broadcasting from noon to 6 a.m., showing CNBC Nordic in the morning.

Programmes and continuity has English audio, with subtitles in Swedish, Finnish, Danish, Norwegian, and Russian. Advertising has sound in different languages.

The channel is carried on most digital cable networks in the region, including TDC Kabel TV and Com Hem. Initially it was only available on satellite from Canal Digital, but it launched on the Viasat satellite platform on 15 August 2006.

In the digital terrestrial networks the channel has been available from the launch of the RiksTV platform in September 2007. In March 2008, the channel received a license to broadcast terrestrially in Sweden, but its launch has been postponed. It is also available terrestrially on the Faeroe Islands. The channel is available in the Finnish terrestrial network as a free-to-air channel.

The sister channel Adventure One had moderate carriage for some time in Scandinavia. Adventure One was replaced by Nat Geo Wild in some cable networks in 2007. On 24 February 2009, Nat Geo Wild was launched on the Viasat satellite platform. It had then already launched on the Swedish Com Hem network on 8 January 2009.

The National Geographic Channel HD was launched into the Nordic region on the Canal Digital platform on 1 April 2007. In January 2008, the HD channel was launched on the Viasat platform. It came to Com Hem in Sweden on 23 May 2008.

On 13 May 2009 special feeds of the channel for the Danish and Norwegian markets were launched.
