= TV 2 Livsstil =

- Country: Norway
- Broadcast area: Norway
- Headquarters: Bergen

Ownership
- Owner: TV 2 Group (Egmont)
- Sister channels: TV 2 Direkte; TV 2 Nyheter; TV 2 Sport; TV 2 Sport Premium; TV 2 Zebra

History
- Launched: 2 November 2015; 10 years ago
- Replaced: TV 2 Bliss

Links
- Website: www.tv2.no/kanaler/livsstil/

Availability

Streaming media
- TV 2 Play: play.tv2.no/direkte-tv/tv-2-livsstil-463577.html (only in EEA)

TV 2 Livsstil is a Norwegian TV channel owned by the TV 2 Group. The channel replaced the previous channel TV 2 Bliss.

== Contents ==
The channel is focused on lifestyle programs. One of the regular shows is Keeping up with the Kardashians. Unlike the predecessor channel, the channel is strictly not limited to women, and planned at launch to include more original productions. One of the planned programs was a weekly television adaptation of Egmont magazine rom123.

== Logo history ==
2015–2021

2021–present
