= NRK Super =

Norwegian television channel

Coordinates: 59°56′07″N 10°43′07″E

- Country: Norway
- Broadcast area: Nationwide

Programming
- Languages: Norwegian Bokmål; Norwegian Nynorsk (some shows); Trøndersk (select shows); Northern Sámi (select shows); Southern Sámi (select shows)
- Picture format: 16:9 / HD 720p

Ownership
- Owner: NRK
- Sister channels: NRK1, NRK2, NRK3, Radio

History
- Launched: 1 December 2007; 18 years ago

Links
- Website: Official website

Availability

Terrestrial
- RiksTV: Channel 6

Streaming media
- NRK TV: Watch live (only in EEA)
- HanseNet: Channel 283

NRK Super is a Norwegian children's television and radio channel, run by NRK. The TV channel is broadcast on the digital terrestrial network and on all Norwegian cable and satellite services, officially from 06:30 to 19:30 (7:30pm) local time, and was launched on 1 December 2007. The NRK Super radio channel is broadcast on DAB radio 24/7 (having previously been on air from 06:00 to 21:00) and on internet radio, and was originally named NRK Barn (NRK Children in English). It was launched on 16 October 2007.

NRK Super also has a standalone streaming service site and streaming app. Virtually all of those services' programming is also available on NRK's regular streaming service NRK TV.

Viasat and RiksTV broadcasts this channel as number 6, while Telenor Norway cable TV lists it as channel 3. As of November 2023, NRK Super officially signs on at 06:30 (having previously signed on at 07:00) and switches to NRK3 at 19:30 (7:30pm). Traditionally the channel simulcasts the NRK Super radio station with an analogue clock in the background from 04:00 (when NRK3's sign-off transitions to NRK Super's sign-off) to circa 06:30; however, starting at some point in the early 2020s, NRK Super would air an unlisted randomised selection of its shows from 04:10-06:30, which did not show up in programme guides.

Currently (as of 2026) NRK Super broadcast from 3:00 to 21:00 (own channel) and also broadcast on NRK3 (3:00-9:00 (in weekend 3:00-11:00) and 17:00-19:00).

During the timeslots where the channel does not air on TV or on streaming services, the m3u8 format livestream shows the sign-off clock with NRK Super radio audio broadcast.

== History ==
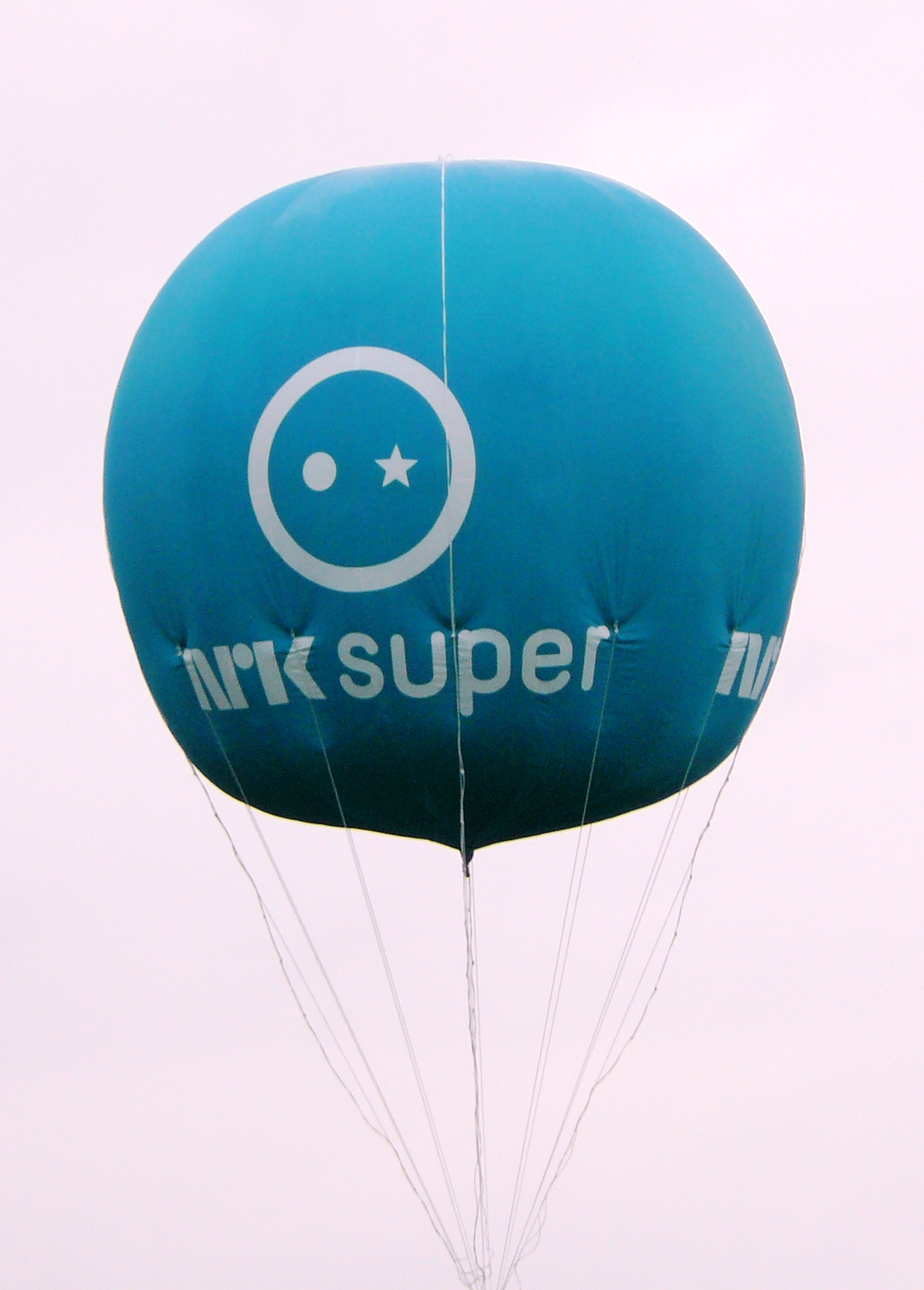
A hot air balloon advertising the television channel in 2008.

NRK Super was started on 1 December 2007, after NRK received the same year's funding of the 50-60 million kroner the channel was estimated to cost, via an increased license. With NRK Super, NRK wanted to fulfill its public broadcasting obligations towards Norwegian children in the target group 2–12, by giving them a holistic offer rooted in Norwegian reality. The vision "We shall create a world where children grow and are important" became a guideline for the channel early on. With the launch of several children's channels in Norway, Disney Channel had achieved high popularity in merely a few years, especially after it had replaced all other kids channels on Canal Digital analogue cable in 2005. NRK Super was the NRK media house's counter-move to face the competition from Disney and other commercial channels (e.g. Jetix and Cartoon Network).

When the channel started, some of the children's programs were broadcast in parallel on the TV channels NRK1 and NRK Super. With the development of the digital terrestrial network, the transmission frequency of NRK Super and NRK3 became available to all license payers. From and including 2010, the children's programs are broadcast, with some exceptions, exclusively on NRK Super. The traditional flagship for children's programs in Norway, Barne-TV, was removed from NRK1's broadcast schedule as of 1 January 2010 and is now only broadcast on NRK Super, having been a regular feature on NRK1 since 16 September 1960.

On 4 January 2010, NRK Super started the program Supernytt, Norway's first news program for children. As of January 2018, the program is broadcast weekdays at 18:50.

NRK Super has had a significant increase in support since its launch. After the first half of 2015, the TV channel had a 36% market share among children under the age of 12. An increasingly large proportion of the content that has traditionally been consumed on TV is now consumed on other platforms. The TV channel accounted for February 2015 about 65% of the audience's use of NRK Super's content, while NRK Super's web/NetTV/apps accounted for 35% of audience visits.

== Programs ==
The programming shown on NRK Super's television network is varied, ranging from preschool shows (Many of them in the Fantorangen programming blocks), to kids and tween shows, both live-action (generally Nordic) shows and foreign cartoons, almost all of them dubbed to Norwegian. As of 1 August 2025, the programming included, but was not limited to, Pip and Posy, Peppa Pig, Maya the Bee, The Smurfs, Tara Duncan, Shaun the Sheep, Heidi, and The Adventures of Paddington.

A small NRK Sápmi slot dedicated to Northern Sámi and Southern Sámi programming airs at around 17:00 daily.

== Vision ==
In 2014, NRK Super summarized its vision as follows:

"NRK Super wants to contribute to children living in Norway having a safe and good media childhood. We must be a universe that reflects cultural diversity and that strengthens the children's identity and self-esteem. Our most important task is to convey good stories and content that is rooted in Norwegian language and culture."

In 2014, the channel had further set itself the goal that it should "play on a team with the school and society" and "respect children as they are (human beings)".

== Logos and identities ==
=== 2007-present ===
NRK Super's first, original logo used 2007-2017

NRK Super's second logo used from 2017 to 2024

NRK Super's third logo used from 2024 to present

== Platforms ==
NRK Super is a collective term for NRK's content for children aged 2 to 12. As of 6 August 2015, these are the main platforms NRK Super broadcasts on, other than on TV:

=== Radio ===
NRK Super
- Norway Svalbard
- Frequencies: DAB+ national multiplex RiksTV: Channel 207

Programming
- Language: Norwegian

History
- First air date: 16 October 2007
- Former names: NRK Barn; NRK Radio Super

Links
- Webcast: radio.nrk.no/direkte/radio_super

The DAB channel Radio Super was started in autumn 2007 under the name NRK Barn. The channel broadcasts 24/7 on DAB, internet, and on most Norwegian TV providers' radio sections (having initially aired from 06:00-21:00). The program "Skolefri" broadcasts as of January 2018 live, weekdays between 14:00 and 16:00 online and DAB.

=== Website ===
The website nrksuper.no was launched in the autumn of 2007, and appeared at the launch as a kind of portal with a section for small children and a section for older children. The design has since been changed several times. The content includes games, online TV and online drama. As of 6 August 2015, the website was Norway's largest website for children.

=== App ===
NRK Super launched its own NRK Super app for mobile and tablet in connection with the 2012 school holidays. With the NRK Super app, users can watch TV programs, live or reruns. In 2015, there were approximately 340,000 unique users per week of NRK Super's online TV offer; NRK Super app and NRK Super's online video platform included. On April 7, 2015, Super presented a new version of the app, which at the time generated over 1 million visits a week.

A similar app was later released for smart-TVs and set-top boxes, although all its content is also in the regular NRK TV smart-TV app.

=== FlippKlipp YouTube channel ===
FlippKlipp was first led by Preben Fjell and Dennis Vareide, who became known as the duo Prebz and Dennis. Then Jonas Lihaug Fredriksen and Henrik Hildre took over, as the duo Baibai and Huginn. Eventually, the duo Fredriksen and Hildre was expanded into a trio, with Victor Sotberg as the third presenter. Herman Dahl was the presenter in a few broadcasts; so was Robin Hofset, known as the YouTuber "RobTheSir". Later, Christopher Robin Omdahl became a presenter on the channel.

== See also ==
- SVT Barn
- DR Ramasjang
