= NRK2 =

Norwegian television channel

- Country: Norway
- Headquarters: Oslo

Programming
- Picture format: 16:9 / HD 720p

Ownership
- Owner: NRK
- Sister channels: NRK1, NRK3, NRK Super

History
- Launched: 1 September 1996; 30 years ago

Links
- Website: tv.nrk.no/direkte/nrk2

Availability

Streaming media
- NRK TV: Watch live (only in EEA)

NRK2 (pronounced as "NRK to" in both Bokmål and Nynorsk) is one of the television channels of the Norwegian Broadcasting Corporation (NRK). It was launched on 1 September 1996.

== History ==
The channel started its regular broadcasts on 1 September 1996, but on the evening before, a live simulcast, led by Trond-Viggo Torgersen, was broadcast on both NRK1 and NRK2. On its first regular broadcast day, around 880,000 people watched the channel during its first evening. From the start, the channel was to be youth-oriented and had people between the ages of 15 and 35 as its target group. For the first eleven years, before the channel changed its profile, culture, entertainment and music programs were mainly broadcast. The target audience was part of NRK's efforts to broaden its remit and to fight the rising influence of TV2. The channel was officially called "NRK TO" until 4 September 2000.

NRK2 was supposed to act as an overflow channel for NRK1 and as a youth channel. In the evening, many films and series were previously broadcast, in addition to programs broadcast on NRK1. During the day, the schedule usually consisted of interactive entertainment, such as chatting. In 2003, Svisj began, which has been broadcast outside the regular program at night and during the day. It mainly consisted of chat and music videos that viewers could vote on using text messages. Sometimes, instead of music videos, other types of footage could be selected - such as sports or Autofil features.

Although over 800,000 viewers watched the channel on the first broadcast day in 1996, the viewing figures were weak in the first week. The newscasts fared best, with a peak of 156,000 viewers. In comparison, TV 2's Nyhetene had 567,000 viewers, and Dagsrevyen had 769,000 viewers on the same day. Eva Bratholm's Bokbadet went down to 46th place with only 22,000 viewers. Autumn 1996 was disappointing for NRK2, with viewership rarely exceeding 100,000 viewers. In the winter of 1997, however, things began to turn around, and during March, the channel surpassed TV3 and was about equal to TVNorge with a viewership of around 200,000 on the most watched programs such as Norge i dag and Absolutt.

In September 1998, the channel was added to Viasat subscribers in Norway, after it inked a deal enabling it to carry the two NRK channels. During the 1 June 2006 NRK strike, it carried Svisj all day.

With the creation of NRK3, NRK2 was changed on 3 September 2007 to a factual and current affairs channel, with an emphasis on news, documentaries and other factual material as well as some cultural material. Among other things, Dagsrevyen was simulcast between NRK1 and NRK2 in the autumn of 2007. Kulturnytt was moved from NRK1 to NRK2 at the same time as the programme's broadcasting time was extended.

After over a year, NRK moved away from the concept that NRK2 should function as its news channel. In the period when continuous news broadcasts were originally broadcast, repeats of NRK's district news were broadcast instead.

On 1 February 2011, the HD feed of the channel, NRK2 HD, was launched.

The channel had a market share of 5.3 percent in 2016.

From 1 January 2018, Nyheter has the right of way on NRK2 to give sister channel NRK1 a more predictable schedule layout, following complaints from viewers that programs such as Med hjartet på rette staden were repeatedly interrupted due to extra news broadcasts on NRK1. As of January 2018, NRK2 wasn't programming between 6 am and 6 pm.

== Programming ==
NRK2, since its launch, has traditionally concentrated more on cultural and in-depth programmes than its sister channel NRK1 and has also shown drama series, comedies, and news. In autumn 2002, it started to air Svisj, an interactive programme with music videos and SMS chat. With the launch of NRK3 in early September 2007, Svisj moved to the new station, and NRK2 refocused its programming to focus on news, documentaries, and cultural programs.

NRK2 offers news, factual and science programmes, drama, music programmes, and entertainment. The program profile for 2018 was divided into the following themes:

- News (26%)
- Facts and society (19%)
- Nature and science (13%)
- Leisure/Hobby/Lifestyle (9%)
- Drama (9%)
- Music (8%)
- Entertainment (7%)
- Sports (6%)
- Other (4%)

== Logos and identities ==
NRK2's first, original and former logo used from 1 September 1996 to 3 September 2000.

Orange-coloured version of NRK2's second and previous logo used until 2 September 2007.

HD logo used from February to October 2011.

NRK2's third and former logo used from 11 October 2011 to 12 June 2024.
