= TV 2 Nyheter =

Norwegian television channel

- Country: Norway
- Broadcast area: Norway
- Network: TV 2 Norway
- Headquarters: Bergen, Norway

Programming
- Picture format: 576i (16:9 SDTV); 1080i (HDTV)

Ownership
- Owner: TV 2 Group (Egmont)
- Sister channels: TV 2 Direkte, TV 2 Zebra, TV 2 Livsstil, TV 2 Sport, TV 2 Sport Premium

History
- Launched: 15 January 2007; 18 years ago
- Former names: TV 2 Nyhetskanalen (2007–2022)

Links
- Website: www.tv2.no/nyheter

Availability

Terrestrial
- RiksTV: Channel 12

Streaming media
- TV 2 Play: play.tv2.no/direkte-tv/tv-2-nyheter-82018.html (only in EEA)

TV 2 Nyheter (TV 2 News) is a 24-hour Norwegian language television news channel which started broadcasting on 15 January 2007. It is Norway's first national news network in Norwegian, although Nyhetskanalen did exist from 1997 to 1998.

The channel's main newsroom is located in Bergen.

== History ==
Its breakthrough came at 2pm on 13 January 2007, two days before its planned launch date, when the channel had a breaking news report about the environmental disaster outside Fedje, breaking into broadcast on its sister channel TV 2. During this breaking news broadcast, Lene Østby Sævrøy and Espen Fiveland anchored the broadcast.

Terje Svabø and Mah-Rukh Ali lead the first ordinary broadcast on 15 January 2007 at 12 noon.

The channel was part of the basic package of RiksTV (Rikspakken) when the channel list was released in the summer of 2007, at the expense of foreign news channels, which were rejected.

== Programming ==
=== Weekdays ===
The channel has broadcasts with presenters in the studio from 06:00 to 22:30. However the newsroom is staffed the whole day and thus, the channel can quickly go on air at the last minute in case news breaks during the night. Through the night, the day's news items are non-stop in Nyhetshjulet. At the same time, a news ticker rolls across the bottom of the screen all day with updates from NTB, TV 2 Nyhetene, TV 2 Sporten, and NA24.no. The broadcasts originate from TV 2's Oslo Bureau along Karl Johans gate from 06:30 to 10:30. The news team at TV 2's headquarters in Bergen takes over from 10:30 (Økonominyhetene) until 15:00. The news is broadcast from Oslo again from 15:00 (Nyhetene) until 18:30. The 18:30 edition of Nyhetene is always broadcast from Bergen. The newscasts between 19:00 to 21:00 alternate between the Oslo bureau and TV 2's Bergen headquarters. The news team at Bergen presents the newscasts from 21:00 to 23:00.

=== Weekends ===
TV 2 Nyheter expanded its output during the weekends from 4 January 2009. The channel broadcasts news, weather, sport, and invites guests in the programme Nyhetsfrokost from 08:00 to 11:30 on each weekend morning. Outside these times, the channel alternates between a newscast, Underhuset, and Nyhetshjulet. The last live broadcast from TV 2 Nyheter during weekends takes place between 13:00 to 13:30. News teams in Oslo and Bergen take turns in assuming hosting responsibilities every week. The weekend editions of the 18:30 and 21 Nyhetene is always produced in Bergen. During the summer, weekend live news is seen from 09:00 to 15:00.

==== Summer changes ====
Since 2010, weekday newscasts during the summer period are live only from 08:00 to 14:00, 17:00 to 17:30, and 22:00 to 22:30.

From 08:00-13:59, each top of the hour consists of a news bulletin that lasts for about 22–23 minutes, after which an assortment of advertisements and show previews for the main TV 2 channel are shown. The presenter recaps the headlines at bottom of the hour. The remaining 10 minutes will be devoted to additional reports and interviews. At 45 minutes past the hour, the channel presents about 10 minutes of sports news.

In addition, the 18:30-Nyhetene and 21-Nyhetene that air on the main TV 2 channel are simulcast on TV 2 Nyheter.

Outside these times, the news is broadcast in a tape-loop but is updated regularly.

== News Anchors ==
- Mah-Rukh Ali
- Espen Fiveland
- Rune Kjos
- Elin Ludvigsen
- Morten Sandøy
- Kjetil H. Dale
- Sturla Dyregrov
- Fin Gnatt (sports news)
- Jan Ove Ekeberg (business news)

== See also ==
- List of Norwegian television channels
