= NRK3 =

Norwegian television channel

- Country: Norway

Programming
- Language: Norwegian

Ownership
- Owner: NRK
- Sister channels: NRK1, NRK2, NRK Super

History
- Launched: 3 September 2007; 18 years ago

Availability

Terrestrial
- RiksTV: Channel 6

Streaming media
- NRK TV: Watch live (only in EEA)
- Hansenet: Channel 283

NRK3 (pronounced as "NRK tre" in both Bokmål and Nynorsk) is a digital television channel produced by the Norwegian Broadcasting Corporation (NRK), aimed at the youth and young adults. NRK3 shares its frequency with NRK Super, a children's TV channel that was launched on 1 December 2007. NRK Super broadcasts between 7am and 7pm. The channel is available on LCN 6 on RiksTV as a free-to-view channel.

== History ==
Launched on 3 September 2007, and on air from 19:30 each evening, the channel featured launch titles such as British and American shows as Sugar Rush, Heroes, Third Watch, The Daily Show, True Blood, Top Gear and Primeval, as well as Norwegian and Scandinavian youth productions like Topp 20, and Det beste fra Åpen Post. A Norwegian adult animated series was being mooted for autumn 2007. Terrestrial coverage would be rolled out between 2007 and 2008 as part of the rollout of RiksTV. The channel opened with a 1.8% share among the over-12 target audience.

Months after launch, the channel started broadcasting the immensely popular Australian soap-opera Neighbours in May 2008, with the first episode broadcast being from October 2007. Late at night, typically after midnight, NRK3 aired the show Svisj (previously on NRK2), an interactive programme with music videos and SMS chat. It ended in 2012.

== Logos and identities ==
NRK3's first, original and previous logo used from 3 September 2007 to 10 October 2011.

HD logo used from February to October 2011.

NRK3's second logo used from 11 October 2011 to 12 June 2024.

HD logo since 2011.
