= Discovery Channel (Norwegian TV channel) =

Norwegian television channel

- Broadcast area: Norway

Ownership
- Owner: Warner Bros. Discovery EMEA (Skydance Corporation)
- Sister channels: Animal Planet; Discovery World; Discovery Science; Investigation Discovery; TLC

History
- Launched: 2001; 25 years ago

Links
- Website: discoveryplus.no/kanaler/discovery

Discovery Channel (often referred to as simply Discovery) is a Norwegian television channel.

Norway is one of the Discovery Channel's strongest markets and the channel regularly has an overall share of viewing of about two percent. It is most popular among younger men.

The original American network used to have one feed covering all four Nordic countries. Special feeds have been launched for Discovery Channel Denmark in 2001 and Discovery Channel Sweden in 2003. Norway and Finland received "Discovery Channel Nordic" until September 1, 2007, when the channel was split into Discovery Channel Norway and Discovery Channel Finland. At the same date, the channels launched in the digital terrestrial network in via RiksTV in Norway and PlusTV in Finland.

Discovery Networks also offer Animal Planet, Animal Planet HD, Discovery HD, Discovery Science, Discovery World and TLC in Norway.
