= NRK1 =

Norwegian television channel

- Country: Norway
- Broadcast area: Norway, reaching bordering regions via overspill of the Norwegian terrestrial network
- Headquarters: Oslo

Programming
- Languages: Norwegian Bokmål; Norwegian Nynorsk; Northern Sami (mostly in short daily newscasts)
- Picture format: 16:9 / HD 720p 16:9 / 576i (RiksTV "Neighbouring region" news)

Ownership
- Owner: NRK
- Sister channels: NRK2, NRK3, NRK Super

History
- Launched: 12 January 1954; 72 years ago (experimental); 13 April 1958; 68 years ago (first programme); 20 August 1954; 72 years ago (official)
- Former names: NRK (until 31 August 1996)

Links
- Website: tv.nrk.no/direkte/nrk1

Availability

Terrestrial
- RiksTV: Channel 1 Channel 995 (Text-to-speech); Channel 999 ("Neighbouring region" news)
- Norlys (Denmark): Channel 91
- Televarpiđ (Faroe Islands): Channel 7

Streaming media
- NRK TV: Watch live (only in Norway)

NRK1 (pronounced as "NRK en" in Bokmål or "NRK ein" in Nynorsk) is the main television channel of the Norwegian Broadcasting Corporation (NRK). It is Norway's oldest and largest television channel and was the country's only free-to-air television channel until the launch of TV 2 in 1992.

In addition to Norway, the channel is available on subscription television companies in Sweden, Denmark, Finland, Iceland, the Faroe Islands and Greenland. In the latter cases, it is available on terrestrial television, behind a subscription.

== History ==
Test broadcasts started on 12 January 1954, regular test broadcasts began on 13 April 1958, and regular broadcasts started on 20 August 1960, formally opened by King Olaf V. At the time, there were plans to increase its transmitter network to cover 80% of the country by 1970. The station in Oslo had been using the callsign LKO-TV (channel 6) as far back as its founding in 1954; when regular broadcasts began, the channel started broadcasting outside of Oslo, starting in August 1960 with transmitters in Bergen (channel 9) and Kongsberg (channel 4), then by late 1961, in Stavanger (channel 8) and Trondheim (channel 2).

Technical costs were high and the budget to produce programming were low.

The channel was formerly known as NRK Fjernsynet (NRK Television), but its name was colloquially abbreviated as just NRK or Fjernsynet ("the television"). On 1 September 1996, the channel was renamed NRK1 due to the launch of NRK2 that same day. The channel was added to Viasat in September 1998.

== Programming ==
Besides its productions, the channel also broadcasts co-productions with other Nordic countries through Nordvision, as well as a significant amount of programmes from English-speaking countries like the United States, United Kingdom, and Australia, and occasionally from Germany (Babylon Berlin, Das Boot), all in the original language with Norwegian subtitles. Its news programme is called Dagsrevyen.

In 2010, NRK HD was launched, broadcasting at 720p. NRK HD was set to make its first official broadcasting from the 2010 Vancouver Olympics opening ceremony, but the first HD broadcast was the slightly earlier Super Bowl XLIV on 7 February 2010. NRK1 eventually turned full-time HD, with the separate SD feeds shutting down approximately in 2016.

The programming lineup has varied over the years, with an increased focus on daytime news beginning in the 2020s, with newscasts almost uninterrupted from 06:30-20:00 on weekdays. Weekends during the daytime are filled with culture and sports programmes. The most prestigious entertainment programmes are broadcast on Friday and Saturday nights, including Nytt på nytt, Beat for Beat, Stjernekamp, and Maskorama. Late-night schedules after the 23:00 news (Kveldsnytt) consist primarily of documentaries and drama shows.

The channel de jure signs off sometime between 04:30 and 05:00, during which time it shows a TV guide, a news feed, and an audio simulcast of NRK P1 until it signs back on at 06:30 for the morning news.

== Audio and subtitle feeds ==
The channel has no alternate audio tracks which can be selected; the text-to-speech mode (Lydtekst) instead has separate channel slots. This became an issue with the documentary series Melkeveien in 2014, for which both Norwegian Bokmål and Northern Sámi audio tracks were produced. The Bokmål feeds were aired on the initial broadcast, while the Sámi feeds were streaming-only on the initial broadcast, before airing on NRK2 the following weekend during daytime.

Other programming where alternate audio feeds were split across multiple TV or radio channels have included the Eurovision Song Contest, where NRK1, NRK P1, and previously NRK3/NRK P3 all have separate commentator voices that are exclusive to their channels, and the 2023 FIFA Women's World Cup, where matches where NRK had TV broadcast rights had separate commentator voices for NRK1 and NRK Sport.

The channel uses digital soft subtitles for all subtitled programming. Alternately, teletext subtitles could previously be selected on page 777; teletext subs were originally discontinued, but had been brought back by October 2018, before being shut down again on 20 August 2025. Available subtitle selections for digital soft subs are limited to "Norwegian", "Norwegian for Hearing Impaired", and "None". No distinctions are made between Bokmål and Nynorsk for any NRK1 audio or subtitle feeds.

== Teletext ==
The channel (as well as its sister channels) maintained a teletext service (Norwegian: Tekst-TV), which as of November 2023 carried news from NRK's news sites, a calendar, football results, TV and radio schedules, NRK company info, and departure and arrival schedules for Norwegian airports; many previous features including weather forecasts and currency conversions had shut down by then. Teletext was shut down entirely on 20 August 2025 at 12:00 CEST, the reasonale being increasing difficulties getting it to synchronise correctly with NRK's internet services.

== Logos and identities ==
Logo of NRK1 from 1 September 1996 to 2 October 2000

Logo of NRK1 from 2 October 2000 to 11 October 2011

Logo of NRK1 from 11 October 2011 to 12 June 2024

== See also ==
- Lilyhammer
- Norsemen
- Skavlan
- NRK original programming, the vast majority of which having aired on NRK1 at some point.
- NRK1 regional services
