= TV 2 Zebra =

Programming
- Picture format: 16:9 (1080i, HDTV)

Ownership
- Owner: TV 2 Group (Egmont)
- Sister channels: TV 2 Direkte, TV 2 Livsstil, TV 2 Nyheter, TV 2 Sport, TV 2 Sport Premium

History
- Launched: 24 January 2004 (SD); 12 December 2013 (HD)
- Closed: 26 February 2012 (SD)
- Former names: TV2 Plus (2003-2004) (working title); TV2 Xtra (2004-2005)

Links
- Website: www.tv2.no/kanaler/zebra/

Availability

Terrestrial
- RiksTV: Channel 7

Streaming media
- TV 2 Play: play.tv2.no/direkte-tv/tv-2-zebra-82016.html (only in EEA)

TV 2 Zebra is a Norwegian television channel showing entertainment programmes, interactive programmes and live sport mainly targeted towards a male audience. The channel was started as TV 2 Xtra on 24 January 2004, but before that the channel was first announced in 2003 as TV2 Plus, which is its working name.

The channel has been a pay-TV basic package channel from the beginning. The channel was initially designed as a general secondary channel, but was later converted into a male demographic channel.

TV 2 Zebra has the rights to "Tippeligaen", and the channel broadcasts a live game every week. In addition, people can subscribe to the other games by buying TV 2 Sport. TV 2 Zebra also invests in Norwegian handball leagues.

In December 2013, the channel started broadcasting in high definition.

== Programs ==
The vast majority of programming is imported, and a few carried over from the main channel (The Julekalender, Reddet), with only a few shows being original productions specifically for TV 2 Zebra:

- Fjorden Cowboys
- Shampo
- Iskrigerne
- Gatebil
- Alene

== Logo history ==
Former logo (2013–2021)
