= TV 2 Sport (Norway) =

Norwegian TV channel

TV2 Sport
- Country: Norway
- Broadcast area: Norway
- Network: TV2 Norway

Programming
- Language: Norwegian
- Picture format: 16:9 (720p HDTV)

Ownership
- Owner: TV 2 Group (Egmont)
- Sister channels: TV 2 Direkte, TV 2 Zebra, TV 2 Livsstil, TV 2 Nyheter, TV 2 Sport Premium

History
- Launched: 24 March 2007

Links
- Website: www.tv2.no/sport

Availability

Streaming media
- TV 2 Play: TV 2 Sport 1 TV 2 Sport 2 (only in EEA)

TV 2 Sport (formerly TV 2 Sport and TV2 Sportskanalen), currently stylized as TV 2 Sport 1 and TV 2 Sport 2, is a Norwegian channel, formerly Pay-TV, that shows sports. The channel is spread out over 2 different channels, named TV 2 Sport 1 and TV 2 Sport 2, earlier TV2 Sport 1-5. It heavily features football, including broadcasting of the Norwegian top division for several years. This channel also broadcasts international matches, such as the Champions League. It also broadcast four 2010 World Cup matches.

== History ==
The channel was launched on 24 March 2007 from Canal Digital, Get, Lyse and BKK. In the autumn, it launched on the terrestrial RiksTV. From 22 March 2009 the channel will also be available from the Viasat satellite platform.

The channel is a premium pay channel with a relatively high price (159 NOK per month, as of 2009). In addition to the main channel, it also offered four extra channels, TV 2 Sport 2, TV 2 Sport 3, TV 2 Sport 4 and TV 2 Sport 5, which allowed them to broadcast five matches at once. The extra channels were, however, not available terrestrially. During UEFA Euro 2008, only twelve of the matches were carried on an exclusive channel, TV 2 Sport UEFA EURO 2008 (the main TV 2 channel carried 19 matches). However, it was only available for Canal Digital subscribers who had access to the main TV 2 Sport channel. The matches were covered in high definition, for the first time, on TV 2 Sport's HD feed, which was available on Get at the time.

On 11 June 2010, TV 2 launched TV 2 Sport Premium (previously TV 2 Barclays Premier League HD), which contains two sport channels. TV 2 Sport Premium Broadcasts live matches from Premier League, the FA Cup, Scottish Premiership, Allsvenskan and SHL.

In 2012 the channel was rebranded to a 24 hours sports channel named TV 2 Sportskanalen. In 2013 the resolution was changed from SD to HD. In 2018, Sportskanalen changed its name to TV 2 Sport 2, the other channel name is TV 2 Sport 1.

== Coverage ==
- Soccer
  - FIFA World Cup qualification
  - UEFA European Championship qualifying
  - UEFA Nations League
  - UEFA Champions League
  - UEFA Super Cup
  - UEFA Women's Champions League
  - CONCACAF Gold Cup
  - Africa Cup of Nations
  - Premier League
  - Allsvenskan
  - Serie A
- Ice hockey
  - GET-ligaen
  - Swedish Hockey League (via CMore)
- Handball
  - REMA 1000-ligaen for men
  - REMA 1000-ligaen for women
- Cycling
  - Tour de France

== On-air staff ==
=== Current on-air staff ===
Game broadcasters

- Kasper Wikestad - hockey play-by-play announcer, studio analyst
- Marius Skjelbæk - hockey play-by-play announcer, studio analyst
- Bjørn Erevik - hockey color analyst
- Erik Follestad - hockey sideline reporter, studio analyst
- Ole Eskil Dahlstrøm - hockey color analyst, studio analyst
- Geir Hoff - studio analyst
