= Allente =

Scandinavian satellite and internet TV provider

- Type: Joint venture
- Industry: Pay television; Telecommunications
- Predecessors: Canal Digital; Viasat
- Founded: May 5, 2020; 6 years ago
- Headquarters: Oslo, Norway; Stockholm, Sweden
- Areas served: Denmark, Finland, Norway, Sweden And Faroe Islands
- Key people: Jonas Gustafsson (CEO)
- Products: Satellite television; IPTV; Wireless broadband
- Owner: Viaplay Group
- Number of employees: 400 (2020)
- Website: allente.dk (Denmark); allente.fi (Finland); allente.no (Norway); allente.se (Sweden)

Allente is a satellite television provider in Denmark, Finland, Norway and Sweden. The company is headquartered in Oslo and Stockholm and was established on 5 May 2020, as a result of a merger between Canal Digital and Viasat Consumer. It is owned 50/50 by Telenor, which owned Canal Digital, and Nordic Entertainment Group, now Viaplay Group, which owned Viasat. Allente television package is also available via IPTV offered through partners. Additionally, Allente offers wireless broadband in Norway and Sweden. The company has around 1.2 million customers.
