= List of magazines in Switzerland =

As of 1977 Ernst Bollinger argued that there were many periodicals in Switzerland most of which came out weekly. These titles were reported to be technical, economic, professional, trade-union, agricultural, sports and religious magazines. Bollinger also stated that the Swiss political and news magazines were not aggressive like those in other European languages.

The following is an incomplete list of current and defunct magazines published in Switzerland. They are published in German, French, Italian or other languages.

== A ==
- Aero Revue
- Annabelle
- Art International

== B ==
- Beobachter
- Bilan
- BILANZ
- Bolero
- Bulletin des Schweizer
- Business Mir

== C ==
- Cabaret Voltaire
- Camera
- Cash
- Cenobio
- Correspondance bi-mensuelle

== D ==
- Il Diavolo
- La Distinction
- Dusie
- Du

== E ==
- Emois
- Ex Tempore

== F ==
- FACTS
- Fakes Forgeries Experts
- FRAZ: Frauenzeitung
- FACES Dein Lifestyle Magazin

== G ==
- Gauchebdo
- The Global Journal

== H ==
- L'Hebdo

== I ==
- İctihat
- illustrazione
- L'Illustré
- L'impact
- Interavia

== J ==
- Jugend-Internationale

== K ==
- Klein Report
- Der Kreis

== L ==
- La Revue militaire suisse
- Lords of Rock

== M ==
- Das Magazin
- Micro Journal
- Migros Magazin

== N ==
- Nebelspalter
- Newly Swissed
- NZZ Geschichte

== O ==
- Old Man

== P ==
- Parkett
- Politik und Wirtschaft
- Posledniya Izvestia
- PME Magazine

== R ==
- Le Révolté
- Revue Automobile
- La Revue de Genève
- Rote Revue

== S ==
- La Salamandre
- Schweizer Eisenbahn-Revue
- Schweizer Familie
- Schweizer Illustrierte
- Schweizer Monat
- Schweizerzeit
- SI Style
- Sept.info
- Signal
- Spendere Meglio
- Stocks
- Swiss Book
- Swiss Derivatives Review
- Swiss IT Magazine
- Syna

== T ==
- Technologist
- Terre & Nature
- Travelling
- Tribune des Arts
- La Tuile
- TV8

== U ==
- UN Special

== V ==
- Vigousse

== W ==
- Welt der Tiere
- Die Weltwoche

== Z ==
- Zoom

== See also ==
- List of newspapers in Switzerland
