= LargeNetwork =

- Formerly: Largeur.com
- Industry: Publishing
- Founded: 16 April 1999
- Founder: Pierre Grosjean and Gabriel Sigrist
- Headquarters: Geneva, Switzerland
- Area served: Suisse romande
- Products: Largeur.com, magazines
- Website: www.largenetwork.com

LargeNetwork (formerly Largeur.com) is a Swiss media agency and custom publisher.

== History ==
LargeNetwork was created by the founders of the on-line magazine Largeur.com, which was launched in 1999. The agency soon expanded its activities into two main areas: supplying editorial content to various media organizations and creating magazines, books and websites for companies and other institutions (custom publishing). Over time, it developed a specialization in information strategy and design.

Journalists at LargeNetwork write original articles for Swiss publications such as L'Hebdo (of the Ringier group), the Tribune de Genève (Tamedia group) and PME Magazine (Axel Springer AG). Since 2003, the agency also produces magazines in collaboration with various companies and institutions.

Since 2009, LargeNetwork produces Le Renard sur la Lune, an annual guide to Geneva, for the city's public-transportation consortium Unireso. Geneva Public Transport subsequently adopted the guide's visual look for its own communications. In 2010, LargeNetwork began producing a daily page for the Swiss newspaper Tribune de Genève. Called "Aujourd'hui" ("Today"), the page targets active urban readers, offering ideas for daily activities each weekday.

== Magazines ==
- Reflex (2006-), magazine of the École polytechnique fédérale de Lausanne (published in French and English).
- On Air (2009-), magazine of World Radio Switzerland (published in English).
- Swissquote (2010-), magazine of the on-line bank Swissquote (published in French and German; in English since 2013).
- Hémisphères (2011-), magazine of the University of Applied Sciences Western Switzerland (published in French).
- In vivo (2013-), magazine of the University Hospital of Lausanne (published in French and English).
- Technologist (2014-), for the École polytechnique fédérale de Lausanne, the Technical University of Munich, the Technical University of Denmark and the Eindhoven University of Technology (published in English, French and German).

== Awards ==
- Grand prix romand de la création 2010 in the "graphic design" category for On Air, the magazine of World Radio Switzerland.
- Grand prix romand de la création 2010 in the "photography" category for the work of the photographer Fred Merz for Le Renard sur la Lune.
- Best financial magazine at the Best of Corporate Publishing Awards 2010 for the Swissquote magazine.
- Chuard Prize 2011 of the "Centre romand de formation au journalisme et aux médias" for Geneviève Ruiz, a journalist at LargeNetwork.
- Gold medal in the "magazine" category of the European Design Award 2012 for the Hémisphères magazine.

== See also ==
- List of magazines in Switzerland
