= List of programmes broadcast by TV 2 (Norway) =

This is a list of TV shows that have been broadcast on TV 2 Direkte in Norway.

== 0–9 ==
Original title	Country	Norwegian title	Genre
10.5	USA		Drama
10-8: Officers on Duty	USA	10-8	Police drama
24	USA		Action
60 Minutes	USA		Journalism
7th Heaven	USA	Den syvende himmel	Drama
90210	USA		Drama

== A ==
Original title	Country	Norwegian title	Genre
Absolutt underholdning	NOR		Entertainment news
Accidentally on Purpose	USA		Sitcom
Agurknytt	NOR		Satire
Akvariet	NOR		Documentary
Alias Smith and Jones	USA		Western
All of Us	USA	Alle Som En	Sitcom
Ally McBeal	USA		Comedy drama
Alt for Rognan	NOR		Reality TV
Allsang på Grensen	NOR		Music
The Amazing Race Norge	NOR		Reality TV
American Idol	USA		Reality TV
America's Got Talent	USA		Reality TV
Andy Richter Controls the Universe	USA		Comedy
Angel	USA		Supernatural
Angels in America	USA		Sitcom
Anna Pihl	DEN		Drama
Army Wives	USA		Koneklubben
Arthur	USA CAN		Animation
Atronautene	NOR		Reality TV

== B ==
Original title	Country	Norwegian title	Genre
Babar	CAN		Animation
Baby Bob	USA		Sitcom
Babylon 5	USA		Science fiction
The Backyardigans	USA; CAN	Bakgårdsgjengen	Animation
Bananas in Pyjamas	AUS	Bananer i pysjamas	Children
The Batman	USA		Animation
Baywatch	USA		Drama
BB2	NOR	Sports	
Becker	USA		Sitcom
Best uten ball	NOR		Contest
Beyblade	JPN		Animation
Beyond the Break	USA		Drama
The Big C	USA		Comedy-drama
Black Books	GBR		Sitcom
Blue Bloods	USA		Crime drama
Blue Murder	GBR		Sitcom
Blue Water High	AUS		Drama
Bob the Builder	GBR	Byggmester Bob	Animation
Boblins	GBR		Animation
Bonanza	USA		Western
Boomtown	USA		Police procedural
Boston Legal	USA		Legal drama
Bot og bedring	NOR		Sitcom
Brimi og Lian	NOR		Food
The Broker's Man	GBR	Svindlernes fiende	Crime drama
Broom	NOR		Motoring
Brothers & Sisters	USA		Drama
Bykampen	NOR		Contest

== C ==
Original title	Country	Norwegian title	Genre
Ca. Lykkelig	NOR		Sitcom
Californication	USA		Drama
Cane	USA		Drama
Can't Hurry Love	USA	Lykkejakten	Sitcom
Caroline in the City	USA	Caroline i Storbyen	Sitcom
Cheers	USA		Sitcom
The Chelsea Handler Show	USA		Talk show
The Chicago Code	USA	Chicagokoden	Crime drama
Chicago Hope	USA		Medical drama
Chili	NOR		
The Chris Isaak Show	USA		Comedy
City Guys	USA		Sitcom
City of Angels	USA		Medical drama
The Cleaner	USA		Drama
The Cleveland Show	USA		Animation
Comanche Moon	USA		Western
Comedy Inc.	AUS		Sketch show
Conrad Bloom	USA		Sitcom
Crawshaw - A brush with art	USA	Crawshaws male – og tegneskole	Educational
Crime Scene Academy	USA		Documentary
Criminal Minds	USA		Crime
Crossing Jordan	USA		Crime

== D ==
Original title	Country	Norwegian title	Genre
Dag	NOR		Comedy drama
Damages	USA		Legal drama
Dave's World	USA	Daves Verden	Sitcom
De 7 drab	DEN		Crime drama
Deadwood	USA		Western
Deal or No Deal (Norwegian version)	NOR		Game show
Deilig er jorden	NOR		Religious
Den som dræber	DEN	Den som dreper	Crime drama
Den store fisketuren	NOR		
Desire	USA		Telenovela
Desperate Housewives	USA	Frustrerte fruer	Comedy drama
Det er sommer, det er sol og det er torsdag	NOR		Interview
Det gode selskap	NOR		Satire
Det store korslaget	NOR		Reality TV
Detroit 1-8-7	USA		Crime drama
Dharma & Greg	USA		Sitcom
Distraction	GBR	Knus bilen	Game show
Distraction	USA	Knus Bilen – USA	Game show
The District	USA		Crime
Dorthe &...	NOR		Interview
Downsize Me	AUS		Reality TV
Dr. Quinn, Medicine Woman	USA		Western
Duel Masters	USA		Animation
Dyrepasserne	NOR		Documentary

== E ==
Original title	Country	Norwegian title	Genre
Ekstreme grenser	NOR		Documentary
Eli Stone	USA		Drama
Elias	NOR		Animation
The Ellen DeGeneres Show	USA		Talk show
En anelse rødt	NOR		
En vakker dag	NOR		Talk show
Endelig Fredag	NOR		Comedy
Entertainment Now	USA		Entertainment news
Evening Shade	USA		Sitcom
Eventyrlige nordmenn	NOR		Documentary
Everybody Hates Chris	USA	Alle hater Chris	Comedy
Everybody Loves Raymond	USA	Alle elsker Raymond	Sitcom
Extras	GBR		Comedy

== F ==
Original title	Country	Norwegian title	Genre
Fagerstrand	NOR		Reality TV
Familieliv	NOR		Documentary
Familiesagaen De syv søstre	NOR		Soap opera
Family Guy	USA		Animation
Far og Sønn	NOR		Sitcom
Fashion House	USA		Telenovela
Filmstjerne	NOR		Reality TV
Filmstriper	NOR		Film criticism
First Wave	CAN		Science fiction
FK Zebra	NOR		Reality TV
Flash	USA		Action
Fra Hollywood til Parkveien	NOR		Documentary
Frasier	USA		Sitcom
Fredag	NOR		Talk show
Fredagsbørsen	NOR		Finance
Freddie	USA		Sitcom
Friends	USA	Venner for livet	Sitcom
Frittgående Hope	NOR		Sketch show
Folkemøte	NOR		Political debate
Forsvar	DEN		Drama
FotballXtra	NOR		Sports
Four Kings	USA	Konger på haugen	Sitcom
Futurama	USA		Animation
Før Helgen	NOR		Talk show

== G ==
Original title	Country	Norwegian title	Genre
The Game	USA	Kamp i kulissene	Sitcom
Gastineau Girls	USA		Documentary
Geronimo Stilton	ITA		Animation
Gjett hva jeg gjør!	NOR		Game show
Glitz	USA		Interactive
God Morgen Norge!	NOR		Morning show
God kveld, Dagfinn	NOR		Sketch show
God kveld, Norge!	NOR		Entertainment news
Godt begynt	NOR		
Golden Goal	NOR		Talk show
The Good Wife	USA	Brutte løfter	Drama
Green Wing	GBR		Comedy
Grey's Anatomy	USA		Medical drama
Grønt lys	NOR		Automobile
Gudesens Conditori	NOR		Religious
Gutta på Tur	NOR		

== H ==
Original title	Country	Norwegian title	Genre
Hack	USA		Crime drama
Half & Half	USA	Halvsøstre	Sitcom
Hamtaro	JPN		Animation
Happy Day	NOR		Makeover
Harper's Island	USA		Horror
Harry and the Hendersons	USA		Sitcom
Hasnaoui	NOR		Talk show
Hawaii Five-O	USA		Police procedural
headLand	AUS		Drama
Hele Historien	NOR		Infotainment
Her blir det liv	NOR		Documentary
Hilde & Brede show	NOR		Sketch show
Himmel og hav	NOR		Documentary
Hjelp, jeg er hypnotisert	NOR		
Holding the Baby	USA		Sitcom
Hollyoaks	GBR		Soap opera
Holmgang	NOR		Debate
Holms	NOR		Sitcom
Home and Away	AUS		Soap opera
Homeland	USA		Drama
Hope and Faith	USA		Sitcom
Hope Island	USA		Drama
Hopkins	USA		Documentary
Horseland	USA		Animation
Hotel Cæsar	NOR		Soap opera
House of Carters	USA		Documentary
The Hughleys	USA		Sitcom
Hustle	GBR		Comedy drama
Hvaler	NOR		Drama
Hyttedrømmen	NOR		Documentary

== I ==
Original title	Country	Norwegian title	Genre
I Get That a Lot	USA		Hidden camera
I kveld med Per Ståle	NOR		Talk show
Idol – Jakten på en Superstjerne (Norwegian version of Pop Idol)	NOR		Reality TV
In Justice	USA	Dømt skyldig	Police procedural
Inside Schwartz	USA		Sitcom
Intelligence	CAN		Crime drama
Inuyasha	JPN		
Isdans	NOR		Reality TV
The IT Crowd	GBR	IT Gjengen	Sitcom
It's All Relative	USA	Liz & Bobby	Sitcom

== J ==
Original title	Country	Norwegian title	Genre
Jake 2.0	USA		Science fiction
Jakten på det gode liv	NOR		Documentary
Jakten på en cesærstjerne	NOR		Reality TV
Jeg gjør hva som helst	NOR		Contest
Jentepiratene	NOR		Documentary
Jenter på hjul	NOR		Documentary
Jeopardy! (Norwegian version)	NOR		Game show
Jericho	USA		Drama
Jimmy Kimmel Live!	USA	Jimmy Kimmel	Talk show
Joey	USA		Sitcom
Judging Amy	USA		Legal drama
The Julekalender	NOR		Christmas calendar
Just for Laughs	CAN	Bare for moro skyld	Hidden camera

== K ==
Original title	Country	Norwegian title	Genre
Karl & Co	NOR		Sitcom
The Killing	USA		Crime drama
King of the Hill	USA		Animation
The King of Queens	USA	Kongen av Queens	Sitcom
Kjendisjakten	NOR		Game show
Klisterhjerne	NOR		Game show
Klovn	DEN		Comedy
Kollektivet	NOR		Entertainment
Komikameratene	NOR		Documentary
Komiker i Arbeid	NOR		Entertainment
Kongomisjonæren	NOR		Documentary
Kristiansen & Strand	NOR		Debate
Kyle XY	USA		Science fiction

== L ==
Original title	Country	Norwegian title	Genre
L.A. 7	USA		Music comedy
Ladies Man	USA	Eneste Hane i Kurven	Sitcom
Langt hjemmefra	NOR		Documentary
Laredo	USA		Western
Lassie	USA		Drama
LazyTown	ISL		Children
Lie to Me	USA	Løgner	Drama
Life on Mars	USA		Crime drama
Life on a Stick	USA		Sitcom
Linc's	USA	Linc’s bar og grill	Comedy
Live from Abbey Road	GBR		Music
Livet på vent	NOR		Documentary
Louie	USA		Comedy
Lunar Jim	CAN		Animation
Lyckliga gatan	NOR		Comedy
The Lyon's Den	USA	I Løvens hule	Legal drama
Lønning & Staff	NOR		Talk show
Lønning direkte	NOR		Talk show
Lørdagskommisjonen	NOR		

== M ==
Original title	Country	Norwegian title	Genre
M	NOR		
M*A*S*H	USA		Sitcom
MacGyver	USA		Action
Malcolm in the Middle	USA	Malcolm i midten	Sitcom
Malibu, CA	USA		Sitcom
The Man Show (Norwegian version)	NOR		Satire
Marienhof	GER		Soap opera
Medical Investigation	USA		Medical drama
Medium	USA		Drama
Melrose Place	USA		Drama
Mens vi venter på operaen	NOR		Culture
Mestermøtet	NOR		Contest
Miami 7	USA		Music comedy
Midsomer Murders	GBR	Mord og mysterier	Crime
Mine damer og herrer	NOR		Talk show
Miniportrettet	NOR		Interview
A Minute With Stan Hooper	USA	Ett minutt med Stan Hooper	Sitcom
Mitt lille land	NOR		
Mitt sanna jag	SWE		Sitcom
Modern Family	USA	En moderne familie	Comedy
Monk	USA		Crime comedy
Mot i brøstet	NOR		Sitcom
The Muppets	USA		Children
Mysterier fra fortiden	NOR		Documentary

== N ==
Original title	Country	Norwegian title	Genre
Nabofeiden	NOR		
Naked and Funny	GBR		Hidden camera
Nettopp Nå	NOR		Talk show
The New Adventures of Old Christine	USA	Christine	Sitcom
Noddy	GBR		Animation
Norgesmester	NOR		Competition
Norske talenter (Norwegian version of America's Got Talent)	NOR		Reality TV
Northern Exposure	USA	Det gode liv i Alaska	Medical drama
Now and Again	USA		Science fiction
Numbers	USA		Police procedural
Numme & Gunstrøm	NOR		Variety
NYPD Blue	USA		Police procedural
Nå eller aldri	NOR		
Nåde den som tror	NOR		Religion

== O ==
Original title	Country	Norwegian title	Genre
Ocean Girl	AUS		Science fiction
October Road	USA		Drama
The Octonauts	GBR	Oktonautene	Animation
Og ikke nok med det	NOR		Talk show
Oh, Grow Up	USA	Bli voksen	Sitcom
Olsenbandens første kupp	NOR		Children
OP7	SWE		Medical drama
Oppdraget			
Oskyldigt dömd	SWE	Uskyldig dømt	Drama
Ozie Boo!	FRA		Animation

== P ==
Original title	Country	Norwegian title	Genre
Pacific Blue	USA		Police procedural
Paradise Hotel	USA		Reality TV
Party of Five	USA		Drama
Passions	USA		Soap opera
Pastor på prøve	NOR		Religion
Penn & Teller: Bullshit!	USA		Infotainment
Pensacola: Wings of Gold	USA	Pensacola	Drama
Philly	USA		Drama
Piano Piano	USA		Variety
Pokémon	JPN		Animation
Prank Patrol	CAN		Hidden camera
Prinsesse Gullhår og de tre omreisende trubadurer	NOR		Comedy
Profiler	USA		Police procedural
PS	NOR		
Punk'd	USA		Hidden camera
På innsiden med Thomas Giertsen	NOR		
På tangenten	NOR		Music
På tråden med Synnøve	NOR		Variety

== Q ==
Original title	Country	Norwegian title	Genre
Quantum Leap	USA	Tidsmaskinen	Science fiction

== R ==
Original title	Country	Norwegian title	Genre
Raballder	NOR		Documentary
Radio 2	NOR		Sitcom
Rugrats	USA		Children
Ran	NOR		Drama
Rebusløpet	NOR		
Redd ferien min	NOR		Consumer affairs
Rejseholdet	DEN	Mordkommisjonen	Crime drama
Rikets Røst	NOR		Satire
Rikets tilstand	NOR		Journalism
RiksDan	NOR		Talk show
Roseanne	USA		Sitcom
The Rockford Files	USA		Mystery
Roswell	USA		Science fiction
Rules of Engagement	USA	Mang Slags Kjærlighet	Sitcom
Rush	AUS		Police drama

== S ==
Original title	Country	Norwegian title	Genre
S Club 7 in Hollywood	USA		Music comedy
Sara & Selma	NOR		Sitcom
Sarahs fornemmelse for kultur	NOR		Culture
Scene 2	NOR		Culture
Scooter: Secret Agent	AUS	Hemmelig agent på moped	Comedy
Segemyhr	SWE		Sitcom
Seinfeld	USA		Sitcom
Senkveld med HC og Tommy	NOR		Talk show
Senkveld med Thomas og Harald	NOR		Talk show
Sentrum	NOR		
Sett på maken	NOR		
She Spies	USA	Trippelagentene	Action-Adventure
Silk Stalkings	USA	Silke	Action drama
Skilda världar	SWE	En annen verden	Soap opera
Skippy the Bush Kangaroo	AUS	Skippy	Adventure
Sledge Hammer!	USA		Satirical police sitcom
Slottet	NOR		Documentary
Solsidan	SWE		Comedy
Something in the Air	AUS	På Bølgelengde	Drama
Sommeren med Guggen	NOR		Comedy
Sommerfugl	NOR		Drama
Sommerpraten	NOR		Interview
Sommerredaksjonen	NOR		
Sommerøya	NOR		
Son of the Beach	USA		Comedy
Sone 2	NOR		Youth
Sonic X	JPN		Animation
Sophias erotiske astroguide	NOR		Erotic
South Park	USA		Animation
Space: Above and Beyond	USA	Skvadron 58	Science fiction
Special Unit 2	USA	Spesialenhet 2	Horror comedy
Spillmagasinet	NOR		Gaming
Sporløs	NOR		Documentary
Sport & Spill	NOR		Sports
Sportsmagasinet	NOR		Sports
SportsXtra	NOR		Sports
Star Trek: The Next Generation	USA		Science fiction
Star Trek: Voyager	USA		Science fiction
Stark Raving Mad	USA	Splitter pine gal	Sitcom
Stjerner i sikte	NOR		Contest
Stol aldri på en kjendis	NOR		Hidden camera
Style Star	USA		Documentary
Summerland	USA		Drama
Sunset Beach	USA		Drama
Supernanny	GBR		Reality TV
Svendsen om Hansen og Jensen	NOR		Documentary
Svenskehandel	NOR		Documentary
Svigerdatter søkes	NOR		Reality TV
Swingtown	USA		Drama
Switched!	USA	Rollebytte	Reality TV
Synnøves duell	NOR		Contest
Sønner av Norge	USA		Reality TV
Søppelkongen	NOR		Reality TV
Sånn er det bare	NOR		

== T ==
Original title	Country	Norwegian title	Genre
Tabloid	NOR		Debate
Takk skal du ha	NOR		
Teletubbies	GBR	Teleteubbiene	Children
Tett på tre	NOR		Comedy
That '70s Show	USA		Sitcom
The Simpsons	USA	Simpsons	Animated
This American Life	USA		Documentary
Threshold	USA		Science fiction
Tid for hage	NOR		Home renovation
Tid for hjem	NOR		Home renovation
Tid for mat	NOR		Food
Tid for reise	NOR		Travel
Titus	USA		Sitcom
Tommys Popshow	NOR		Music
Tonight med Timothy Dahle	NOR		Talk show
Tonje Steinsland møter...	NOR		Interview
Toot & Puddle	USA		Animation
Torpedo	NOR		Thriller
Torsdag kveld fra Nydalen	NOR		Sketch show
Torsdagsklubben	NOR		Satire
Total Security	USA		Crime
Tracey Takes On...	USA		Sketch show
Traffic Light	USA	Mixed Signals	Comedy
Travel Girls	USA		Reality TV
Travel Sick	GBR		Travel
Tribunefeber	NOR		Sports
Tropicaliente	BRA	Forbudt kjærlighet	Soap opera
Trude/	NOR		Journalism
Try my Life	USA		Reality TV
TV2 hjelper deg	NOR		Consumer
TV2000	NOR		
Twin Peaks	USA		Drama
Two Guys and a Girl	USA	Pizzagjengen	Sitcom

== U ==
Original title	Country	Norwegian title	Genre
Ultraviolett	NOR		
Undeclared	USA	Collegeliv	Comedy
Unsolved Mysteries	USA	Uløste Gåter	Mystery
Utspørringen	NOR		Political debate

== V ==
Original title	Country	Norwegian title	Genre
Valgfritt	NOR		Political debate
Vazelina Hjulkalender	NOR		Christmas calendar
Veien til paradis	NOR		Documentary
Vennebyen	NOR		Animation
The Vice	GBR		Crime drama
Villmarksliv	NOR		Nature
Virre Virre Vapp	NOR		
The Visitor	USA	Gjesten	Science fiction

== W ==
Original title	Country	Norwegian title	Genre
Wanted	USA		Police drama
Waschera	NOR		Youth
Water Rats	AUS		Drama
We Bare Bears	USA		Animation
Weird & Dangerous	GBR		
Welcome to New York	USA	Velkommen til New York	Sitcom
What About Brian	USA		Drama
White Collar	USA		Crime drama
White Collar Blue	AUS		Drama
Who Wants to Be a Millionaire? (Norwegian version, Vil du bli millionær?)	NOR	Vil du bli millionær?	Game show
Wild Card	CAN		Mystery
Winx Club	ITA		Animation
W.I.T.C.H.	USA		Animation
Wolf	USA		Drama

== X ==
Original title	Country	Norwegian title	Genre
The X-Files	USA		Science fiction

== Y ==
Original title	Country	Norwegian title	Genre
Yes, Dear	USA	Ja, kjære	Sitcom

== Z ==
Original title	Country	Norwegian title	Genre
Zorro	USA		Adventure

== Ø ==
Original title	Country	Norwegian title	Genre
Ønskedrømmen	NOR		Entertainment
Øyenvitne	NOR		Crime
