= Salamandre =

Salamandre may refer to:

== Arts and entertainment ==
- La Salamandre (Alain Tanner), a 1971 Swiss drama film
  - "La Salamandre"/"Juke Box", a Patrick Moraz single originally composed for the film
- Le salamandre, a 1969 Italian film
- La Flamme d′amour, ou La Salamandre, an 1863 Russian ballet
- La Salamandre, an 1832 novel by Eugène Sue
- La Salamandre (magazine), a Swiss magazine about nature

== Geography ==
- Salamandre Lake, Quebec, Canada
- Salamandre River, Quebec, Canada
- La Salamandre Cave - see List of caves in France

== Military ==
- Salamandre, a French ship used in the capture of York Factory in 1694
- Salamandre, a French Navy ship commanded by Aimé Reynaud in the 1840s
- Salamandre class, an 18th-19th century French Navy class of two corvettes - see French corvette Naturaliste
- French aviso Salamandre (1847), a French Navy dispatch boat which was shipwrecked in 1848 - see List of shipwrecks in April 1848
- Operation Salamandre, part of Opération Daguet, the French military's involvement in the Gulf War
- Division Salamandre, another name for the French-led Multi-National Division (South-East) (Bosnia), part of the Implementation Force, a peacekeeping force in Bosnia and Herzegovina from 1995 to 1996

== Other uses ==
- Prix de la Salamandre, a former horse race for two-year-olds
- Tour Salamandre, the only surviving tower of the Château de Beaumont, Beaumont, Belgium

== See also ==
- Salamander (disambiguation)
