= FRAZ: Frauenzeitung =

Swiss feminist magazine (1976–2009)

- Categories: Feminist magazine
- Frequency: Quarterly
- Founded: 1976
- Final issue: September 2009
- Country: Switzerland
- Based in: Zürich
- Language: German
- OCLC: 1040296556

FRAZ: Frauenzeitung was a feminist magazine published in Zürich, Switzerland, from 1976 to 2009. It was one of the early feminist publications in German-speaking countries and was the first feminist magazine in Switzerland.

== History and profile ==
The magazine was started in 1976 as the official organ of the Women's Liberation Movement (FBB - Frauenbefreiungsbewegung). It was first named Fraue-Zitig. Later it appeared as an unaffiliated publication. The magazine was published quarterly and covered articles about politics, culture, and society. The headquarters of the magazine was in Zürich.

The magazine was the recipient of the 2001 Equality Award by the city of Zürich. FRAZ: Frauenzeitung ceased publication in 2009 due to financial challenges. The last issue appeared in September 2009.

== See also ==
- List of magazines in Switzerland
