= Juliana (disambiguation) =

Juliana is a feminine given name. It may also refer to:

== Places ==
- Juliana Canal, Netherlands
- Juliana Peak, a former name of Puncak Mandala, a mountain in Papua, Indonesia
- Juliana Republic, a short-lived state in the Brazilian province of Santa Catarina in 1839

== People ==
- Anicia Juliana (462–527/528), daughter of the Western Roman Emperor Olybrius, one of the first non-reigning female art patrons in recorded history
- Juliana of the Netherlands (1909-2004), queen of the Netherlands from 1948 until her abdication in 1980
- Dhita Juliana (born 1993), Indonesian beach volleyball player
- Jurrick Juliana (born 1984), Dutch Curaçaoan footballer

== Arts, entertainment, and media ==
=== Fictional characters ===
- Juliana Crain, a main character in the TV series The Man in the High Castle
- Lady Juliana, a fictional character in the 1998 cartoon movie Quest for Camelot

=== Literature ===
- Juliana (film), a 1988 Peruvian film
- Juliana (poem), one of four signed poems ascribed to Anglo-Saxon poet Cynewulf
- Juliana, or The Princess of Poland, a play by John Crowne

== Brands and enterprises ==
- Juliana's, a Japanese 1990s discotheque
- Juliana's Pizza, a pizzeria in Brooklyn, New York

== Other uses ==
- Juliana (ship), several ships
- Juliana '31, a football club from Malden, Netherlands
