= Beat Frischknecht =

Swiss real-estate and audio-tech entrepreneur

- Born: 1961 (age 64–65)
- Occupations: Entrepreneur; investor; company director
- Known for: Founder and chairman of BFW Liegenschaften; owner and chairman of Revox Group; board member of Peach Property Group

Beat Frischknecht (born 1961) is a Swiss entrepreneur and investor best known for founding the real-estate company BFW Liegenschaften AG and for owning the Swiss audio brand Revox. He also serves on the board of directors of the listed residential landlord Peach Property Group.

== Career ==
=== Early career ===
Frischknecht trained in banking and later worked as an independent wealth manager before moving into property investment, according to Swiss business media profiles.

=== BFW Liegenschaften ===
Frischknecht founded BFW Liegenschaften AG in 2000 and has served in executive and board roles over multiple periods, including as chief executive between 2000 and 2006 and again from 2012, helping to build the firm into a profitable Swiss real-estate company focused on residential portfolios. Media reports attribute to BFW and related holdings several hundred rental apartments - many around Zurich - as well as commercial properties.

=== Revox Group ===
Frischknecht is owner and chairman of the Revox Group, the Swiss audio manufacturer known for its reel-to-reel recorders and hi-fi systems. Since the late 2010s he has overseen investments to revive the brand, including an experience centre "Revox World" near Zurich and new products referencing classic models.

=== Peach Property Group ===
In 2024 - 2025 Frischknecht joined the Peach Property Group AG board of directors, as the company focused on its German residential platform; his appointment is listed in corporate disclosures. The company’s governance report lists him as a Swiss citizen born in 1961.

== Net worth ==
Swiss business magazine Bilanz lists Frischknecht in its annual rich list Die 300 Reichsten (The 300 richest Swiss people). In 2024 the magazine estimated his fortune at CHF 275 million (rank 256) in the real-estate category, domiciled in the canton of Thurgau.

== Other roles ==
Public company and registry summaries list Frischknecht as chair of Fairgate AG and Revox (Schweiz) AG, and in leadership roles at Pretium Group companies and Ahead Wealth Solutions in Liechtenstein.

== Recognition ==
Swiss media have profiled Frischknecht among prominent real-estate investors; Bilanz has covered his career as an entrepreneur and investor and his ownership of Revox.
