= Sarah Kiden =

Ugandan technologist and researcher

- Born: Sarah Kiden
- Education: Uganda Christian University (BSc, MSc Information Systems)
- Alma mater: Uganda Christian University
- Occupations: Technologist, Researcher
- Years active: 2015–present
- Employer: University of Southampton
- Known for: Broadband performance research, Internet measurement in Africa, Digital infrastructure research
- Awards: Mozilla Open Web Fellow; Ford-Mozilla Fellow; Marie Curie Research Fellow

Sarah Kiden is a Ugandan technologist and researcher appointed to the University of Southampton, United Kingdom, in 2024. She specializes in technology-based solutions for community development, broadband performance, and Internet measurement in Africa.

Kiden holds a Bachelor's degree and a Master of Science in Information Systems from Uganda Christian University. She was a Ford-Mozilla Fellow (2017–2018), a Mozilla Open Web Fellow, and a RANITP Fellow hosted by Research ICT Africa. Between 2019 and 2024, she conducted doctoral research at Northumbria University and served as a Marie Curie Research Fellow from June 2020 to June 2022.

Prior to her doctoral studies, Kiden headed the Systems Department at Uganda Christian University and worked with the Research and Education Network for Uganda (RENU). She has also served as an Internet Society Ambassador and as a member of the Internet Corporation for Assigned Names and Numbers (ICANN) At-Large Advisory Committee.

Sarah Kiden is a Ugandan technologist, appointed as a researcher at Southampton University in United Kingdom in 2024. Kiden focuses on technology based solutions for community development. She was a RANITP fellow and Mozilla Open Web Fellow, a program hosted by Research ICT Africa and holds a bachelor's degree and Masters of Science in Information Systems from Uganda Christian University. Between 2017-2018 she was a Ford-Mozilla fellow hosted by Research ICT Africa. She undertook research for her PhD at Northumbria University between 2019 and 2024. She was a Marie Curie Research Fellow during part of this time (June 2020 until June 2022).

Kiden's interventions focus on broadband performance and Internet measurements in Africa. In 2017, she headed the systems department at Uganda Christian University and was at the time, a facilitator for Research and Education Network (RENU), a Ugandan-based organisation working on improving Internet service provision for learning institutions in Uganda. Kiden participated as an Internet Society Ambassador and also served at Internet Corporation for Assigned Names and Numbers (ICANN) as the At-Large Advisory Committee member.

== Publications ==
Kiden is the author or co-author of 18 book chapters, conference contributions and reports. They include:

- Zhaoxing Li, Vahid Yazdanpanah, Jindi Wang, Wen Gu, Lei Shi, Alexandra I. Cristea, Sarah Kiden & Sebastian Stein (2025) TutorLLM: Customizing Learning Recommendations with Knowledge Tracing and Retrieval-Augmented Generation. In: Ardito, C., et al. Human-Computer Interaction – INTERACT 2025. INTERACT 2025. Lecture Notes in Computer Science, vol 16110. Springer, Cham.
- Gillwald, Alison, Johnson, David, Cloete, Laurens, Hadzic, Senka, Kiden, Sarah, Rens, Andrew and Phokeer, Amreesh... (2022) African open source digital infrastructures: evaluating the landscape, Cape Town. Research ICT Africa, 70pp.
- Lillian Nalwoga, Sarah Kiden & Daniel K Nanghaka (2015) Children online safety: an insight into legal, regulatory and practices in Uganda. Project report.

== See also ==
- Science and Technology in Uganda
- Lillian Achom
