= Rosalia Wenger =

Swiss author and feminist (1906–1989)

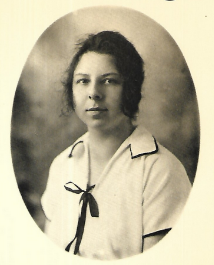
- Born: 5 June 1906; Basel
- Died: 5 December 1989 (aged 83); Bern
- Occupations: Author, feminist activist
- Notable work: Rosalia G. Ein Leben (1978)
- Children: 2

Rosalia Wenger (5 June 1906 – 5 December 1989), also known as Rosalia Grützner, was a Swiss author and feminist activist who as a child had been a contract child (Verdingkind).

== Life ==
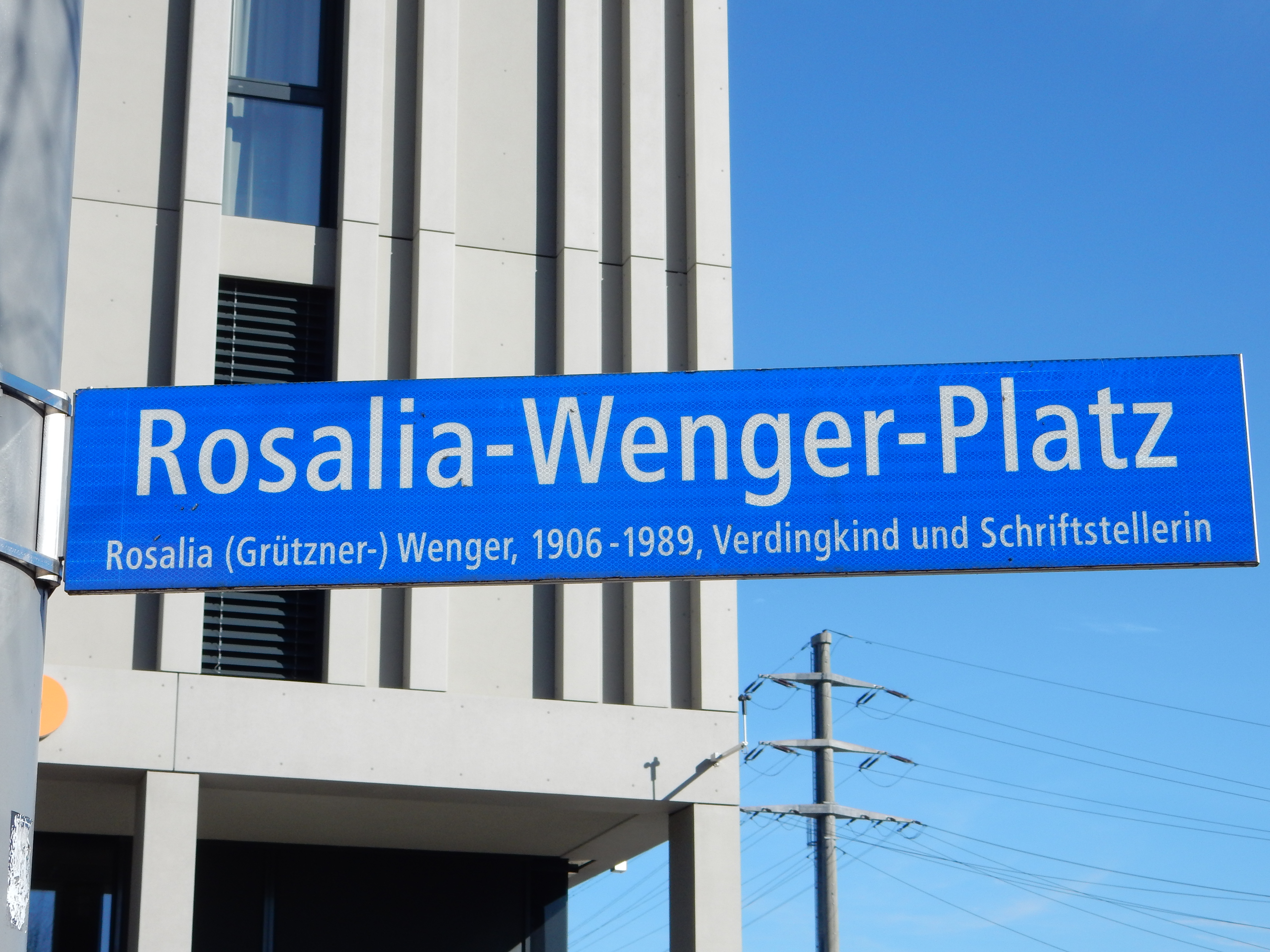
A square in Bern was named after her.

Wenger was the illegitimate daughter of the German artist Albin Lessing, who had taken refuge in Switzerland after being accused of lèse-majesté in Dresden, and Rosina Wenger, a domestic servant from Wahlern. Lacking papers, Lessing could not marry Rosina Wenger and emigrated to the United States shortly after their child's birth. As Rosina Wenger did not have enough money to raise her daughter, Rosalia grew up with her maternal grandparents at the Lischern estate near Schwarzenburg in the canton of Bern. From 1913 she attended the Waldgasse primary school in Schwarzenburg and stood out for her good results.

After the death of her grandmother, her main figure of reference, Wenger was placed at the age of 11 with a family she did not know in the same locality. She worked hard as a servant for five years in a haulage business and post office, which took a heavy toll on her body; besides the exploitation of her labor as child labor, she suffered many humiliations and was not allowed to attend secondary school. As an adolescent she was employed as a domestic servant and worker in nine different establishments, and then began an apprenticeship as an ironer and laundress in Bern. In 1932 she married the carpenter Albert Grützner, with whom she had two daughters.

Wenger thought several times of seeking a divorce, as Grützner controlled her and limited her freedom of movement. For many years, encouraged by her daughters and son-in-law but without her husband's knowledge, she wrote her memoirs. After the death of her husband, who had been hostile to women's suffrage, she joined the Frauenbefreiungsbewegung (FBB), in which her daughters were also active. Activists of the movement's Bern-Bethlehem group typed up the manuscript of Wenger's recollections and so facilitated its publication.

Rosalia G. Ein Leben, published in 1978 by Zytglogge Verlag and dedicated to the women of the MLF, reached a wide public and received the City of Bern's book prize in 1979. Wenger was the first woman in German-speaking Switzerland to recount her experience as a contract child and to speak of the mistreatment suffered in foster placement, drawing interest even outside Switzerland and inspiring other publications. Her second autobiographical work, published in 1982, was titled Warum hast du dich nicht gewehrt. Aufzeichnungen. She also wrote poems and political essays, including Der armen Schweizerin Schweiz (1970), a feminist commentary on Peter Bichsel's La Suisse du Suisse, most of which remained unpublished. In her writings she denounced the consequences of poverty, synonymous with dependence and social control, particularly for women and children. Since 2004 a square north of the Wankdorf station in Bern has borne the name of Rosalia Wenger.

== Works ==
- Rosalia G. Ein Leben (1978).
- Warum hast du dich nicht gewehrt. Aufzeichnungen (1982).

== Bibliography ==
- Dallach, Sybille; Pulver, Elsbeth (1985). Zwischenzeilen. Schriftstellerinnen der deutschen Schweiz.
- Brügger, Nadia; Meyer, Valerie-Katharina (2025). Widerstand und Übermut. Schweizer Schriftstellerinnen der 1970er-Jahre.
- Swiss Literary Archives, Bern, Rosalia Wenger
