= Federal Office for Gender Equality =

Swiss federal office

Federal Office for Gender Equality (FOGE)
- (in German) Eidgenössische Büro für die Gleichstellung von Frau und Mann, EBG (in French) Bureau fédéral de l’égalité entre femmes et hommes, BFEG (in Italian) Ufficio federale per l'uguaglianza fra donna e uomo, UFU

Agency overview
- Formed: 1988; 38 years ago
- Jurisdiction: Switzerland
- Headquarters: Schwarztorstrasse 51, 3003 Bern
- Employees: 18
- Minister responsible: Alain Berset
- Agency executive: Sylvie Durrer
- Website: ebg.admin.ch

The Federal Office for Gender Equality (FOGE) (German: Eidgenössische Büro für die Gleichstellung von Frau und Mann, EBG, French: Bureau fédéral de l’égalité entre femmes et hommes, BFEG, Italian: Ufficio federale per l'uguaglianza fra donna e uomo, UFU) is a Swiss federal authority promoting equality between men and women in all areas of life, including law, professional life, family, education, politics, and society. The FOGE also works to prevent violence against women and domestic violence.

It is subordinated to the Federal Department of Home Affairs and governed by the Gender Equality Act (GEA).

While its mandate is limited to the federal level, Offices for Gender Equality also exist in cantons and municipalities in some large cities. In addition, many organizations in Switzerland (trade unions, employers’ organizations, businesses, training institutions, etc.) employ equality specialists (equality officers, gender specialists, etc.).

== History ==
The Canton of Jura was the first to create an equality office, named the Department of Women's Studies (Bureau de la condition féminine), in 1979. Its first head, Marie-Josèphe Lachat, remained in office until 1995.

The Canton of Geneva created an Office of Equality in November 1987, with the mission of promoting equality in the different parts of society and monitoring that new legislation conforms to the principles of equality. The responsibility was entrusted to the jurist Marianne Frischknecht. The Federal Council took a similar decision in February 1988 and attached this institution to the Federal Office of Culture. It was also headed by a lawyer, Claudia Kaufmann.

In September 1989, the Grand Council of the canton of Vaud accepted motions from Marie-Louise Jost, a Green deputy, and Janou Corderey, a liberal deputy, requesting the creation of such an office. The State Council accepted the principle in January 1990 and the Grand Council officially voted to create it in February. The sociologist Françoise Pasche was the first person in charge.

At the same time, the canton of Neuchâtel followed the same process, with the Grand Council accepting the principle in October 1989 and the opening of the Office of Equality and Family in October 1990, under the responsibility of Catherine Laubscher. In 1992, it was the canton of Valais' turn to decide to set up an office for equality.

== Current situation in Switzerland ==
=== National level ===
At the national level, there has been a Federal Office for Gender Equality in Switzerland since 1988, which is subordinated to the Federal Department of Home Affairs. Its mission is to promote gender equality in all areas of life, i.e. to eliminate all forms of direct and indirect discrimination. The FOGE carries out information and awareness-raising work, provides employers, workers and associations with various tools and draws up position papers about current issues. It is also responsible for the allocation of financial aid in accordance with the Gender Equality Act (loi sur l’égalité, LEg by its acronym in French).

The 2030 Gender Equality Strategy was approved by the Federal Council in 2021, and FOGE is responsible for monitoring and approving measures to implement and improve the plan.

=== Regional level ===
At the regional level, there are municipal offices in the cantons that ensure the implementation of gender equality in their respective geographical areas. Their tasks vary from canton to canton. Some offices also have the task of promoting equality within the organization of which they are a part. As a rule, their work focuses more on changing structures than on individual assistance.

To lead their tasks, the equality offices work together with other public authorities, social partners, women's and men's organizations, and various economic and social actors. Many cantons have established permanent governmental equality commissions that include representatives of these bodies (at the national level, the Federal Commission for Women's Issues, FCWI by its acronym in English). The national office and the cantonal and municipal offices are grouped together in the Swiss Conference of Equality Delegates. The office of the Principality of Liechtenstein is also a member with observer status.

== International presence ==
The FOGE represents Switzerland regarding gender equality issues in multiple international organizations, such as the OECD, and UN Women, as well as being a member of the Council of Europe’s Gender Equality Commission and the committee of the Equal Pay International Coalition (EPIC).

== Women and Media Awards ==
Around CHF 4.5 million Swiss francs are available each year for projects that promote gender equality in Switzerland, as well as further CHF 3 million for projects to prevent and combat violence against women and domestic violence.

In 2010, the offices for equality in Romandy created a "Femmes et médias" (Women and Media Awards), in order to award journalists who, "in a concern for professional ethics, advance the debate on equality between women and men”. The offices note that women do not benefit from the same media treatment as men: they are less present quantitatively and are more frequently described in a stereotyped way.

Three prizes were awarded in 2010: 1st prize to the media project "Les Quotidiennes" (2009); 2nd prize to Muriel Mérat for "Sida au Cameroun" (broadcast De quoi j'me mêle, RSR; December 6, 2009), 3rd prize to Annick Monod for "La crise mondiale de la pilule" (La Liberté, September 29, 2009).

The second edition took place in 2013, with the following winners: 1st prize to Florence Hügi for her column "Mauvais genre" published in La Liberté; 2nd prize to Jean-Daniel Bohnenblust and Jochen Bechler for their report "À travail égal, salaire inégal" broadcast in the program Temps Présent; 3rd prize to Mario Fossati, Eric Bellot and Florence Huguenin for their report "Un corps, deux sexes", broadcast in the program 36.9°.

The 2016 edition awarded four prizes: 1st prize to Laura Drompt, Dominique Hartmann and Mohamed Musadak Adelita for their report on jobs in the care sector (Le Courrier, March 7, 2015); 2nd prize to Pierre-Yves Moret for his program "La place à part des femmes dans l'Église" in Hautes fréquences (La 1re, March 1, 2015); jury's "coup de coeur" prize to Albertine Bourget for her articles published in the Swiss magazine Femina and on the website Sept. info during 2015, in particular; special prize to celebrate the 20th anniversary of the federal Gender Equality Act on the program Babylone (Espace 2, 2015).

== LGBTI community ==
From 2024 on, issues regarding the LGBTI community are to be integrated into the scope of the Federal Office for Gender Equality.

== See also ==
- Swiss labour law
- Gender equality
