= List of wildlife magazines =

This is a non-exhaustive (incomplete) list of wildlife magazines.

Magazines on ornithology and bird-watching can be found in list of ornithology journals.

== In English ==
- BBC Wildlife, British monthly, since 1963
- Birds & Blooms, US, bi-monthly
- British Wildlife, British, six times per year, since 1989
- National Wildlife Magazine, publication of the National Wildlife Federation
- SWARA, published by the East Africa Wildlife Society
- Zoobooks
- The Zoologist, monthly, an expansion of The Entomologist in 1843, merged with British Birds in 1916

== In French ==
- La Salamandre

== In Norwegian ==
- Villmarksliv
