= Timeline of strikes in 1991 =

Strikes in 1991

A number of labour strikes, labour disputes, and other industrial actions occurred in 1991.

== Background ==
A labor strike is a work stoppage, caused by the mass refusal of employees to work, usually in response to employee grievances, such as low pay or poor working conditions. Strikes can also take place to demonstrate solidarity with workers in other workplaces or to pressure governments to change policies.

== Timeline ==
=== Continuing strikes from 1990 ===
- 1990s Donbas miners' strikes
- 1990-93 Greyhound strike, by Greyhound Lines drivers.
- First Intifada, including strikes, against the Israeli occupation of the West Bank and the Gaza Strip.
- 1990–1992 movement in Madagascar
- 1990–1991 New York Daily News strike, 5-month strike by New York Daily News staff.
- 1990–1991 Togo protests

=== January ===
- 1991 Manitoba nurses' strike, breaking the record for the longest nurses strike in Manitoba history.

=== February ===
- 1991 Alliant Techsystems strike, by Alliant Techsystems workers for pay raises.
- 1991 Romanian rail strike, 2-week strike by railway workers in Romania.

=== March ===
- General strike in Mali, against the dictatorship of Moussa Traoré, resulting in the 1991 Malian coup d'état.
- 1991 Soviet miners' strike

=== April ===
- 1991 Belarusian strikes, anti-Soviet movement in the Byelorussian Soviet Socialist Republic.
- 1991 CUNY strike, at the City University of New York.
- 1991 Montana public sector strike, 6-day strike by public sector workers in Montana, United States.

=== May ===
- 1991 Albanian general strike, led by the United Independent Albanian Trade Unions and the Democratic Party of Albania, part of the Fall of communism in Albania.

=== June ===
- 1991 Cameroonian general strike
- 1991 GM Baltimore strike, 26-day strike by workers at a General Motors facility in Baltimore, represented by the United Auto Workers.
- 1991 Switzerland women's strike
- 1991 United Nations cafeteria strike, by restaurant and cafteria workers at the Headquarters of the United Nations.

=== August ===
- 1991 Canadian postal strike, organised by the Canadian Union of Postal Workers.

=== September ===
- 1991 Frontier strike, over 6-years long strike by workers at the New Frontier Hotel and Casino, represented by the Culinary Workers Union, one of the longest strikes in American history.
- 1991 Public Service Alliance of Canada strike
- 1991 Zaire unrest, including strikes, against the dictatorship of Mobutu Sese Seko.

=== October ===
- 1991 Los Angeles nurses' strike
- 1991 Lukens strike, by workers at the Lukens Steel Company in the United States, represented by the United Steelworkers.

=== November ===
- 1991 Botswana manual workers' strike, 5-day strike by National Amalgamated Central, Local & Parastatal Manual Workers' Union members in Botswana, the second in the union's history and first since 1968.
- 1991 Pennsylvania nurses' strike, organised by the Pennsylvania Nurses Association.
- 1991 South African general strike, 2-day general strike by the African National Congress against apartheid.

=== December ===
- 1991 Yale University strike, by graduate students at Yale University in the United States for recognition of Local 33–UNITE HERE.
