= List of shipwrecks in April 1848 =

The list of shipwrecks in April 1848 includes ships sunk, foundered, wrecked, grounded, or otherwise lost during April 1848.

== 1 April ==
List of shipwrecks: 2 April 1848
Ship	State	Description
Caledonia, and Stars and Stripes	United Kingdom; United States	The paddle steamer Caledonia was in collision with the schooner Stars and Stripes and drove ashore on Governors Island, Massachusetts. Caledonia was on a voyage from Boston, Massachusetts to London. She was later refloated, resuming her voyage on 7 April. Stars and Stripes was severely damaged.
Iscudear	Ottoman Empire	The steamship was driven ashore near Cape Floroz, in the Black Sea with some loss of life. She was on her maiden voyage, from Constantinople to Trebizond. Iscudear was refloated on 16 April and taken in to Trebizond.
John Jardine	United States	The ship was driven ashore on Browns Island, Maine. Her crew were rescued. She was on a voyage from New York to Saint John, New Brunswick.

== 2 April ==
List of shipwrecks: 2 April 1848
Ship	State	Description
Amadée	France	The lugger sank at the mouth of the Laïta.
John and Eliza	United Kingdom	The ship ran aground on the West Mouse Sand, in the Irish Sea off Holyhead, Anglesey and sank. Her crew were rescued. She was on a voyage from Runcorn, Cheshire to New Ross, County Wexford.
Louisa Jane	United Kingdom	The ship was driven ashore and wrecked at Alt Skagen, Denmark. Her crew were rescued. She was on a voyage from Portmadoc, Caernarfonshire to Stettin.
Njiord	Sweden	The ship was driven ashore on the Råbjerg mile, Denmark with the loss of a crew member. Her crew were rescued. She was on a voyage from Liverpool, Lancashire, United Kingdom to Gothenburg.

== 3 April ==
List of shipwrecks: 3 April 1848
Ship	State	Description
Courrier de Moule	France	The ship was wrecked at San Juan, Puerto Rico.
Friendship	United Kingdom	The ship was driven ashore near Bideford, Devon. She was on a voyage from Barry, Glamorgan to Bideford.
Mary E. Balch	United States	The brig was wrecked at San Juan.

== 4 April ==
List of shipwrecks: 4 April 1848
Ship	State	Description
Barry's	(United Kingdom of Great Britain and Ireland) Cape Colony	The schooner was driven ashore and wrecked in Struy's Bay.
Erndte	Prussia	The ship was driven ashore on Læsø, Denmark. Her crew were rescued. She was on a voyage from Hartlepool, County Durham, United Kingdom to Swinemünde. She had been refloated by 13 May and taken in to Copenhagen, Denmark.
Houghton le Spring	United Kingdom	The ship ran aground at Bahia, Brazil. Her crew were rescued. She was on a voyage from London to Mauritius.
Rajasthan	United Kingdom	The ship sprang a leak and was abandoned off Île Bourbon. She was on a voyage from Greenock, Renfrewshire to Bombay, India. She was subsequently taken in to Saint Gilles, Mauritius.
Waterloo	(United Kingdom of Great Britain and Ireland) Cape Colony	The coaster was wrecked in Cawood's Bay with the loss of two of her crew.

== 5 April ==
List of shipwrecks: 5 April 1848
Ship	State	Description
Ann Harley	United Kingdom	The ship was driven ashore in the Clyde 3 nautical miles (5.6 km) downstream of Gourock, Renfrewshire. She was on a voyage from Glasgow, Renfrewshire to New York, United States. She was refloated the next day and resumed her voyage.
Barry	(United Kingdom of Great Britain and Ireland) Cape Colony	The schooner was wrecked in Struys Bay.
Clara	Danzig	The ship was driven ashore at Hirtshals, Denmark. She was on a voyage from Hartlepool, County Durham, United Kingdom to Neufahrwassar. She was refloated and put in to Helsingør, Denmark in a leaky condition. Subsequently taken in to Danzig for repairs.
Eliza	United Kingdom	The ship ran aground on the Western Ledge, off the Isle of Wight. She was on a voyage from Cardiff, Glamorgan to Southampton, Hampshire. She was refloated and resumed her voyage.
Eliza	United Kingdom	The ship was run aground on a reef south of Saint Croix. She was on a voyage from Dominica to Sain Thomas, Virgin Islands. She was refloated the next day and resumed her voyage on 7 April.
Janus	Greifswald	The ship ran aground on the Falsterbo Reef, in the Baltic Sea. She was on a voyage from Greifswald to South Shields, County Durham. She was refloated and put in to Helsingør.
Joanna	United Kingdom	The barque was wrecked in Algoa Bay.
Julian	United Kingdom	The barque was wrecked in Algoa Bay.
Linnet	United Kingdom	The sloop was driven ashore near Aberdovey, Cardiganshire. She was refloated on 1 May and taken in to Aberdovey.
Martha	United Kingdom	The brig was wrecked in Algoa Bay.
Nancy	(United Kingdom of Great Britain and Ireland) Cape Colony	The ship was wrecked in Mossel Bay.
Supurbe	Prussia	The ship was driven ashore at Memel. Her crew were rescued. She was on a voyage from Memel to Limerick, United Kingdom. She was consequently condemned.
Tim Pickering	United States	The brig was wrecked in the Fiji Islands.
Venus	United Kingdom	The schooner was wrecked at Avalon, Fiji Islands. Her crew were rescued.
Waterloo	(United Kingdom of Great Britain and Ireland) Cape Colony	The coaster was wrecked in Cawood's Bay.
Watkins	United Kingdom	The ship collided with Agnes (United Kingdom) and sank off the Tuskar Rock with the loss of two of her crew. She was on a voyage from Matanzas, Cuba to Liverpool, Lancashire.

== 6 April ==
List of shipwrecks: 6 April 1848
Ship	State	Description
Comet	United Kingdom	The ship was wrecked on "Green Island", near Algeciras, Spain. She was on a voyage from Palermo, Sicily to London.
Emma	Sweden	The ship was driven ashore at Alt Skagen, Denmark. Her crew were rescued. She was on a voyage from Charlestown, South Carolina, United States to Gothenburg.
Rosebud	United Kingdom	The ship was driven ashore at "West Klit", Jutland. She was on a voyage from Grangemouth, Stirlingshire to Stettin. She had been refloated by 11 April and sailed for Fredrikshavn, Denmark for repairs.
Ruby	United Kingdom	The ship was wrecked at Skagen, Denmark. she was on a voyage from Grangemouth to Stettin.
Sarah and Martha	United Kingdom	The ship ran aground on the Boulder Sandbank, in the Solent. She was on a voyage from Goole, Yorkshire to Portsmouth, Hampshire. She was refloated the next day and completed her voyage.
Success	(United Kingdom of Great Britain and Ireland) South Australia	The ship was driven ashore at Adelaide. She was refloated.
William	United Kingdom	The ship struck a sunken rock off The Lizard, Cornwall and was damaged. She was on a voyage from Newport, Monmouthshire to London. She consequently put in to Falmouth, Cornwall.

== 7 April ==
List of shipwrecks: 7 April 1848
Ship	State	Description
Elizabeth, and an Unknown vessel	United Kingdom; France	The full-rigged ship Elizabeth was run into by an unknown French vessel, which foundered with the loss of all hands. Elizabeth was abandoned on 9 April. Her 23 crew were rescued by the brig Quebec ( (United Kingdom of Great Britain and Ireland) British North America). Elizabeth was on a voyage from Mobile, Alabama, United States to Liverpool, Lancashire.
Rambler	United Kingdom	The ship was lost at the mouth of the Rio Grande. Her crew were rescued. She was on a voyage from Waterloo, Lancashire to Lisbon, Portugal and the Rio Grance.
Sisters	United Kingdom	The ship caught fire at Belfast, County Antrim and was scuttled.
Taglioni	United States	The full-rigged ship was wrecked on the Carysfort Reef. All on board were rescued. She was on a voyage from Havre de Grâce, Seine-Inférieure, France to New Orleans, Louisiana.

== 8 April ==
List of shipwrecks: 8 April 1848
Ship	State	Description
Agenoria	United Kingdom	The brig sprang a leak and was beached near Great Yarmouth, Norfolk. She became a wreck the next day.
Berlin	United Kingdom	The barque ran aground on the Arklow Bank, in the Irish Sea off the coast of County Wicklow and was abandoned by all but four of her crew. She was on a voyage from Philadelphia, Pennsylvania to Liverpool, Lancashire. She was later refloated, and was subsequently towed in to Waterford by Duke of Cornwall (United Kingdom).
Concord	United Kingdom	The ship ran aground on the Barnard Sand, in the North Sea off the coast of Suffolk. She was refloated and taken in to Lowestoft, Suffolk in a leaky condition.
Elizabeth	United Kingdom	The ship was in collision with a brig in the Atlantic Ocean. She was abandoned the next day. Her crew were rescued by the brig and Asenath (United Kingdom), which took five men. Elizabeth was on a voyage from Mobile, Alabama, United States to Liverpool.
Expedition	United Kingdom	The ship ran aground and sank off St. Ives, Cornwall with the loss of a crew member. She was on a voyage from Teignmouth, Devon to Gloucester.
Mary	United Kingdom	The ship ran aground on the Inglesilla Shoal, in the Atlantic Ocean east of Sanlúcar de Barrameda, Spain and was wrecked. Her crew were rescued. She was reported to be on a voyage from Poole, Dorset to Stettin.
North Durham	United Kingdom	The ship ran aground and was damaged on the Newcombe Sand, in the North Sea off the coast of Suffolk. She was on a voyage from Sunderland, County Durham to L'Orient, Morbihan, France. She was refloated.
Timandra	United Kingdom	The ship was driven ashore in the Dardanelles. She was later refloated.

== 9 April ==
List of shipwrecks: 9 April 1848
Ship	State	Description
Cambria	United Kingdom	The sloop was driven ashore and sank at Drogheda, County Louth. Her crew were rescued. She was on a voyage from Fleetwood, Lancashire to Dublin. Cambria was refloated on 17 April and taken in to Drogheda for repairs.
Mercator	Spain	The brig foundered in the Atlantic Ocean. Her crew were rescued. She was on a voyage from Matanzas, Cuba to Antwerp.
Rubicon	United Kingdom	The ship was driven ashore and wrecked on Rügen, Prussia. Her crew were rescued. She was on a voyage from Sunderland, County Durham to Stettin.
Trusty	United Kingdom	The ship was driven ashore at New York, United States. She was on a voyage from Halifax, Nova Scotia, British North America to New York.

== 10 April ==
List of shipwrecks: 10 April 1848
Ship	State	Description
Hoffnung	Kingdom of Hanover	The ship was driven ashore. She was on a voyage from Carolinensiel to London, United Kingdom. She was refloated and taken in to Harwich, Essex, United Kingdom.
Hope	(United Kingdom of Great Britain and Ireland) Van Diemen's Land	The cutter was wrecked at Port Sorell.
Majestic	United Kingdom	The ship was wrecked at Moriches, New York, United States. She was on a voyage from New York City to London.
Resolution	United Kingdom	The ship ran aground on the Skerweather Sands, in the Bristol Channel. She was on a voyage from Bristol, Gloucestershire to Swansea, Glamorgan. She was refloated and taken in to Porthcawl, Glamorgan in a leaky condition.
Seeblume	Stettin	The ship was driven ashore on Rügen, Prussia. Her crew were rescued. She was on a voyage from Grangemouth, Stirlingshire, United Kingdom to Stettin.
Susan and Isabella	United Kingdom	The schooner was driven ashore on the north coast of Rügen, Prussia. She was on a voyage from Grimsby, Lincolnshire to Danzig. She was refloated and resumed her voyage.

== 12 April ==
List of shipwrecks: 12 April 1848
Ship	State	Description
Jane A. Morice	(United Kingdom of Great Britain and Ireland) British North America	The ship was wrecked on the Isle of Pines, Cuba. She was on a voyage from Cienfuegos, Cuba to Halifax, Nova Scotia.
Janet Kinnear	United Kingdom	The ship was driven ashore at Montrose, Forfarshire.
Jemmy	France	The ship was wrecked on the Calvados Rocks. She was on a voyage from Libourne, Gironde to Caen, Calvados.
Rose	Norway	The ship was driven ashore near Brekkestø. Her crew were rescued. She was on a voyage from Bergen to Gothenburg, Sweden.
Vestal	United Kingdom	The ship was in collision with the brig Darlington (United Kingdom) and sank off the Dudgeon Lightship ( Trinity House). Her crew were rescued by Liberty (United Kingdom). Vestal was on a voyage from London to South Shields, County Durham.

== 13 April ==
List of shipwrecks: 13 April 1848
Ship	State	Description
Jane Williams	(United Kingdom of Great Britain and Ireland) New South Wales	The cutter ran aground on a reef off Nobbys Head. She was refloated and taken in to Newcastle for repairs.
Mantura	United Kingdom	The schooner was in collision with the steamship William Penn (United States) and sank in the Irish Sea off The Skerries, off the coast of County Antrim. Her crew were rescued by William Penn. Mantura was on a voyage from São Miguel Island, Azores to Liverpool, Lancashire.
Sarah Wilson	(United Kingdom of Great Britain and Ireland) New South Wales	The schooner was wrecked on a reef off Nobbys Head. She was on a voyage from Sydney to Newcastle.

== 14 April ==
List of shipwrecks: 14 April 1848
Ship	State	Description
Apollo	Kingdom of Hanover	The ship was driven ashore and wrecked near "Hansted", Denmark. Her crew were rescued. She was on a voyage from Bergen, Norway to Papenburg.
Childe Harold	United Kingdom	The brig was driven ashore at the Swinemünde Lighthouse, Prussia. Her crew were rescued. She was on a voyage from Aberdeen to Stettin.
Herald	United Kingdom	The ship was wrecked on False Immanuel Head, Northumberland. She was on a voyage from Grangemouth, Stirlingshire to South Shields, County Durham.
Nabob	United Kingdom	The East Indiaman, a barque, struck the Ecrehos Rocks, off Jersey, Channel Islands and was wrecked with the loss of eleven of her 21 crew. She was on a voyage from Calcutta, India to London.
Progress	United Kingdom	The paddle tug sank near Hartley, Northumberland. Her crew were rescued.
Robert and anne	United Kingdom	The barque sprang a leak and sank off Brixham, Devon.
Soeblomsten	Norway	The ship ran aground on the Lemon Sand, in the North Sea. She was on a voyage from Christiania to London, United Kingdom. She was refloated on 18 April and towed in to Great Yarmouth, Norfolk, United Kingdom in a waterlogged condition.

== 15 April ==
List of shipwrecks: 15 April 1848
Ship	State	Description
Dolphin	United Kingdom	The smack was driven ashore and wrecked at Shamble Head, Pembrokeshire. She was on a voyage from Cardigan to Cardiff, Glamorgan.
Earl St. Vincent	(United Kingdom of Great Britain and Ireland) Tobago	The drogher was driven ashore and wrecked in Richmond Bay.
Giorge	Prussia	The schooner was wrecked at Coulse Point, Gironde, France. Her crew were rescued. She was on a voyage from Stettin to Bordeaux, Gironde.
Navarino	United Kingdom	The ship was driven ashore and abandoned at Burnham Overy Staithe, Norfolk. She was on a voyage from London to King's Lynn, Norfolk.
Relief	United Kingdom	The sloop was in collision with Bee and Veracity (both United Kingdom) and was beached at Scarborough, Yorkshire.

== 16 April ==
List of shipwrecks: 16 April 1848
Ship	State	Description
Effort	United Kingdom	The brig was driven ashore at Helsingør, Denmark.
Hope	United States	The whaling ship struck a rock near the entrance to the Bay of Islands, New Zealand. Crew and cargo were saved with the assistance of HMS Calliope (Royal Navy).
Margaret	United Kingdom	The ship arrived at Santa Cruz de Tenerife, Canary Islands in a severely damaged condition. She was on a voyage from Cardiff, Glamorgan to Callao, Peru. She was consequently condemned and sold for breaking.
Mary and Dorothy	United Kingdom	The ship was driven ashore and severely damaged on the Cop Point Rocks, off Folkestone, Kent. She was refloated and taken in to Folkestone the next day.
Senator	United Kingdom	The screw steamer ran ashore in Whitsand Bay. She was on a voyage from Dublin to London. She subsequently broke in two.
Triton	United Kingdom	The ship ran aground on the Steil Sand, in the North Sea and sank. She was on a voyage from Harwich, Essex to "Petersen". She was refloated and taken in to Cuxhaven.

== 17 April ==
List of shipwrecks: 17 April 1848
Ship	State	Description
Boussole	Belgium	The ship was severely damaged at Antwerp. She was on a voyage from St. Ubes, Portugal to Antwerp.

== 18 April ==
List of shipwrecks: 18 April 1848
Ship	State	Description
William and Nancy	United Kingdom	The ship ran aground and sank at the Mumbles, Glamorgan. She was on a voyage from Llanelly, Glamorgan to Barnstaple, Devon.

== 19 April ==
List of shipwrecks: 19 April 1848
Ship	State	Description
HMS Dragon	Royal Navy	The Centaur-class frigate ran aground near Waterford.
Queen	United Kingdom	The ship ran aground off Eierland, North Holland, Netherlands. She was on a voyage from Rio de Janeiro, Brazil to Hamburg. She was refloated on 21 April and taken into Nieuw Diep.
Shields	United Kingdom	The ship capsized at St. David's. She was refloated.
Sterling	United Kingdom	The ship was driven ashore on Tybee Island, Georgia, United States.

== 20 April ==
List of shipwrecks: 20 April 1848
Ship	State	Description
Alliwal	United Kingdom	The barque was driven ashore at Sucar Point, Lothian. She was on a voyage from Newcastle upon Tyne, Northumberland to Dublin.
Benares	India	The steamship caught fire, exploded and sank in the Ganges 4 nautical miles (7.4 km) downstream of Rajmahal with the loss of 20 to 30 lives.
Henry	United Kingdom	The ship struck The Manacles and sank. Her crew were rescued. She was on a voyage from Charleston, South Carolina to Cardiff, Glamorgan.
Margaretta	United Kingdom	The ship was in collision with the cables securing the North Haisborough Sand Lightship ( Trinity House) and sank. She was on a voyage from Newcastle upon Tyne, Northumberland to Rochester, Kent.
Octavie	Belgium	The ship was driven ashore at the Bumen Paudermark, in the Scheldt. She was on a voyage from Rio de Janeiro, Brazil to Antwerp. She was refloated on 22 April and taken in to Vlissingen, Zeeland, Netherlands.

== 21 April ==
List of shipwrecks: 21 April 1848
Ship	State	Description
Euphrasia	United Kingdom	The ship ran aground on the Pickles Reef. She was on a voyage from New Orleans, Louisiana, United States to Liverpool, Lancashire. She was refloated and taken in to Key West, Florida, United States, where she arrived on 27 April.
Jane	(United Kingdom of Great Britain and Ireland) New South Wales	The schooner was driven ashore and wrecked at Port Fairy.
Jessie Scott	United Kingdom	The schooner departed on 21 April from Stralsund for Leith, Scotland with a crew of seven, but did not reach Helsingør, Denmark. Sunken wreckage found off Rügen, Prussia in early May was later confirmed as Jessie Scott.
Lady Sarah Maitland	United Kingdom	The ship was wrecked on the Isabella Reef, off the cost of Cuba. Her crew were rescued by Maitland (United Kingdom). Lady Sarah Maitland was on a voyage from Port Maria, Jamaica to Matanzas, Cuba.
Matchless	United Kingdom	The ship ran aground on the Barber Sand, in the North Sea off the coast of Norfolk. She was refloated and resumed her voyage in a leaky condition.
Regent	United Kingdom	The ship struck the Pinel Rocks, off Guernsey, Channel Islands and sank. Her crew were rescued. She was on a voyage from Shoreham-by-Sea, Sussex to Guernsey.
Vertrauen	Danzig	The ship was wrecked on Selchy Skerry, Orkney Islands, United Kingdom. She was on a voyage from Danzig to Liverpool, Lancashire.

== 22 April ==
List of shipwrecks: 22 April 1848
Ship	State	Description
Grande	Flag unknown	The brig was abandoned in the Atlantic Ocean. Her crew were rescued by Hancock (United States).
Hardy	(United Kingdom of Great Britain and Ireland) Jersey	The ship was driven ashore on Walcheren, Zeeland, Netherlands. Her crew were rescued. She was on a voyage from Cardiff, Glamorgan to Hamburg.
Henry and Jane	United Kingdom	The schooner was driven ashore 1 league (4.8 km) north east of Cape Palos, Spain. She was refloated on 25 April and taken in to Cartagena, Spain.
Jane	United Kingdom	The brig ran aground on the Gunfleet Sand, in the North Sea off the coast of Essex. She was subsequently wrecked. Her crew were rescued. Her crew were rescued by the smacks Aurora's Increase and Orwell (United Kingdom). Jane was on a voyage from Newcastle upon Tyne, Northumberland to London.
Marianne	Danzig	The ship was in collision with another vessel and was abandoned in the English Channel 2 leagues (5.2 nmi; 9.7 km) off Cap Gris Nez, Pas-de-Calais, France. Her crew were rescued. She was on a voyage from Portsmouth, Hampshire, United Kingdom. Marianne was subsequently taken in to Boulogne, Pas-de-Calais.
Paradox	United Kingdom	The schooner capsized and sank in a squall in the South China Sea with the loss of seven lives. She was on a voyage from Shanghai to Hong Kong.

== 23 April ==
List of shipwrecks: 23 April 1848
Ship	State	Description
Dolore	Spain	The ship was driven ashore in the "Tagebucht" and sank. She was on a voyage from Bilbao to Christiansand, Norway.
Eleaore	United Kingdom	The lugger was driven ashore near Rye, Sussex. She was on a voyage from Sunderland, County Durham to Bordeaux, Gironde. She was refloated and taken in to Rye.
Judy	(United Kingdom of Great Britain and Ireland) Jersey	The ship was wrecked on the Minquiers, in the Channel Islands. Her crew were rescued. She was on a voyage from Plymouth, Devon to Jersey.
Juliana	(United Kingdom of Great Britain and Ireland) Guernsey	The ship struck the Humph Rocks and was abandoned by her crew. She foundered the next day. She was on a voyage from Guernsey to London.
Lucifer	United Kingdom	The screw steamer suffered a boiler explosion and sank off the Hilbre Islands, Cheshire. All on board were rescued.
Mentor	France	The brig ran aground on the Brai Bank, in the English Channel off the coast of Nord, capsized and was wrecked. Her crew were rescued. She was on a voyage from Newcastle upon Tyne, Northumberland, United Kingdom to Saint-Malo, Ille-et-Vilaine.

== 24 April ==
List of shipwrecks: 24 April 1848
Ship	State	Description
London	United Kingdom	The ship was run aground on the Margate Sand, off the coast of Kent. She was refloated and made for Whitstable, but consequently sank off Reculver. Her crew were rescued. She was refloated on 26 April and towed in to Margate, Kent.

== 25 April ==
List of shipwrecks: 25 April 1848
Ship	State	Description
Colonial	United Kingdom	The barque was wrecked on the Half Moon Keys, off the coast of Jamaica. She was on a voyage from Savanilla, Republic of New Granada to Jamaica.
Eleonora	(United Kingdom of Great Britain and Ireland) British North America	The barque was wrecked at Burlington. Her crew were rescued.
Hope	United Kingdom	The ship ran aground on the Florida Reef. She was on a voyage from New Orleans, Louisiana, United States to Liverpool, Lancashire. She was refloated and taken in to Key West, Florida, United States, where she arrived on 30 April.
John Williams	United Kingdom	The ship ran ashore on "Amack Island", Denmark. She was on a voyage from Riga, Russia to Hull, Yorkshire. She was refloated and resumed her voyage.

== 26 April ==
List of shipwrecks: 26 April 1848
Ship	State	Description
Jane and Ellen	United Kingdom	The ship was driven ashore at the Point of Ardnamurchan, Caithness. Her crew were rescued.

== 27 April ==
List of shipwrecks: 27 April 1848
Ship	State	Description
Alexina	United Kingdom	The ship was driven ashore by ice in the Gut of Canso. She was on a voyage from Puerto Rico to Canso, Nova Scotia, British North America and Liverpool, Lancashire. She was consequently condemned.
Cove	United Kingdom	The ship was in collision with Westpoint (United Kingdom) and was abandoned in the Atlantic Ocean with the loss of four of her crew. Her passengers and surviving crew were rescued by Westpoint. Cove was on a voyage from London to Quebec City, Province of Canada, British North America.
Petras	France	The brig was driven ashore and wrecked at Key West, Florida, United States. Her crew were rescued. She was on a voyage from Havana, Cuba to Havre de Grâce, Seine-Inférieure.

== 28 April ==
List of shipwrecks: 28 April 1848
Ship	State	Description
Monarch	United Kingdom	The ship was driven ashore at Chapel St. Leonards, Lincolnshire. She was on a voyage from the Charente to Hull, Yorkshire and Newcastle upon Tyne, Northumberland.

== 29 April ==
List of shipwrecks: 29 April 1848
Ship	State	Description
Jacoba Maria	Netherlands	The ship was wrecked on a reef north west of Læsø, Denmark. She was on a voyage from Liverpool, Lancashire, United Kingdom to Randers, Norway.
Spring, and Vestal	United Kingdom	The ships collided in the North Sea off the coast of Norfolk and sank with the loss of all hands.

== 30 April ==
List of shipwrecks: 30 in April 1848
Ship	State	Description
Rosalinda	United Kingdom	The ship struck a sunken rock and foundered near Algeciras, Spain. Her crew were rescued. She was on a voyage from Livorno, Grand Duchy of Tuscany to Kronstadt, Russia.

== Unknown date ==
List of shipwrecks: Unknown date in April 1848
Ship	State	Description
Alexina	United Kingdom	The ship was driven ashore by ice in the Gut of Canso after 22 April. She was on a voyage from Puerto Rico to Quebec City, Province of Canada, British North America.
Algomah	United States	Carrying a cargo of clay, the 114-foot-9-inch (35 m), 269.14-gross register ton brig sank in Lake Michigan south of Racine, Wisconsin. She was refloated, repaired, and returned to service.
Alice Gray	United Kingdom	The ship departed from Philadelphia, Pennsylvania, United States for Londonderry in mid-April. No further trace, presumed foundered with the loss of all hands.
Amity	United Kingdom	The full-rigged ship was abandoned in the Atlantic Ocean before 14 April.
Courrier de Saint Pierre	France	The ship was wrecked on the Castillos, in the River Plate in early April. She was on a voyage from an English port to Montevideo, Uruguay.
Doris	Grand Duchy of Mecklenburg-Schwerin	The ship was lost on the coast of Sicily before 20 April. Her crew were rescued.
Elizabeth Helen	United Kingdom	The ship was abandoned in the Atlantic Ocean before 30 April. Her crew were rescued by Emma (France). Elizabeth Helen was on a voyage from Figueira da Foz, Portugal to Saint John's, Newfoundland, British North America.
Fortuna	Netherlands	The ship was wrecked on the Île de Ré, Charente-Maritime, France before 6 April. She was on a voyage from Cette, Hérault, France to Amsterdam, North Holland.
Hope	(United Kingdom of Great Britain and Ireland) Van Diemen's Land	The cutter was wrecked at Port Sorell.
Lydia	Denmark	The brig was driven ashore on Heneaga. She was refloated and taken in to Sait Thomas, Virgin Islands.
Robert	(United Kingdom of Great Britain and Ireland) British North America	The brig was abandoned in the Atlantic Ocean before 24 April.
Saint Laurent	France	The ship was driven ashore at "Bredeville Suray", Manche before 19 April. Her crew were rescued.
Saint Louis	Belgium	The ship capsized in the Mediterranean Sea before 6 April. her crew were rescued.
Salamandre	French Navy	The aviso was driven ashore on the coast of Provence. Her crew were rescued.
Sarah Wilson	(United Kingdom of Great Britain and Ireland) New South Wales	The schooner was wrecked at Newcastle before 22 April.
