= TV 2 Direkte =

Television station in Norway

- Country: Norway
- Headquarters: Bergen

Programming
- Language: Norwegian
- Picture format: 720p HDTV

Ownership
- Owner: TV 2 Group (Egmont Group)
- Sister channels: TV 2 Zebra; TV 2 Livsstil; TV 2 Nyheter; TV 2 Sport; TV 2 Sport Premium

History
- Launched: 5 September 1992; 34 years ago
- Former names: TV 2

Links
- Website: tv2.no

Availability

Terrestrial
- RiksTV: Channel 3

Streaming media
- TV 2 Play: Watch live (only in EEA)

TV 2 Direkte (English: TV 2 Direct) is a Norwegian terrestrial television channel. Its headquarters are located in Bergen. TV 2 began test broadcasting on 13 November 1991, and a year later, it was officially launched on 5 September 1992, becoming Norway's first commercial free-to-air television channel. In 1992, TV 2 A/S was admitted as full active member of the European Broadcasting Union.

As is common with television (and cinema) in Norway, most foreign-language shows and segments of local programmes with foreign language dialogues (e.g. interviews with foreigners) are subtitled in Norwegian, not dubbed (with a notable exception being children's programmes). Since 2012, TV 2 has been owned by one of its co-founders, the Danish media company Egmont Group.

The channel was renamed from TV 2 to TV 2 Direkte in 2023, in an attempt to differentiate it from their streaming service TV 2 Play (not to be confused for the Danish service with the same name).

The channel was free-to-air on terrestrial TV from its launch date until 1 January 2010, when it became a pay-TV channel. On cable TV and satellite it was de facto a pay-TV channel from the start.

== History ==
In 1990, the Storting opened the way for an advertising-financed alternative to NRK to be established. The license was announced on 31 January 1991, with the requirement that no owner could own more than 20 per cent of the shares in the channel. There were many interested parties for the concession, and among others Schibsted, Egmont, Orkla, a grouping around Rolf Wesenlund and Arne Fjørtoft and an investor group called NTN went with plans to apply for the license. The license was won by TV 2 AS in 1991. The company was a consortium owned by Schibsted, Vital Forsikring, Gutenberghus, NTN, Selvaag, Bergens Tidende and Sissel Ditlevsen.

TV 2 had its official start on 5 September 1992 with the show For første gang (For the First Time), led by Dan Børge Akerø. The show was a simulcast with NRK, and was seen by 1.7 million viewers.

Normal broadcasts started the following day with the broadcast of an Eliteserien match between Viking and Rosenborg, a concert with the Oslo Gospel Choir in addition to news, sports and a documentary. In addition, the American series Flipper and Et vilt liv had been given a place on the broadcast schedule.

In the first week on the channel, viewers saw premieres of the channel's own productions such as VTV, Askeladden and Holmgang, in addition to foreign series such as Cheers, The Naked Gun and A Country Practice.

== TV 2 Direkte HD ==
TV 2 started broadcasting in high-definition on 25 June 2009. Initially, the channel was only available on the terrestrial RiksTV platform. The first programme broadcast in HD was Allsang på grensen. Other broadcasts in HD during 2009 include Tour de France, Friday and Saturday movies, Sunday night football, Jakten på kjærligheten, Skal vi danse and American series such as Grey's Anatomy, Cleaners, Scrubs, Brothers & Sisters, Modern Family and Criminal Minds. TV2 also produces original programming, including the award-winning show Gylne tider.

TV 2 Direkte HD is transmitted in 720p50.

== Original programming ==
- TV 2 Nyhetene
- God morgen Norge
- Kompani Lauritzen
- Kasko
- Hver gang vi møtes
- Sofa (Sequel to the NRK1 show with the same name)
- Farmen
- Norge bak fasaden
- Dyrepasserne
- The Voice (Norway)

=== Discontinued original programming ===
- Torsdag kveld fra Nydalen
- Senkveld med Thomas og Harald
- Hotel Cæsar
- TV2 hjelper deg
- Holmgang
- Idol (Norwegian TV series)
- Norske Talenter (moved to TVNorge in 2023)

== Logos ==
TV2 logo (2003–2013)

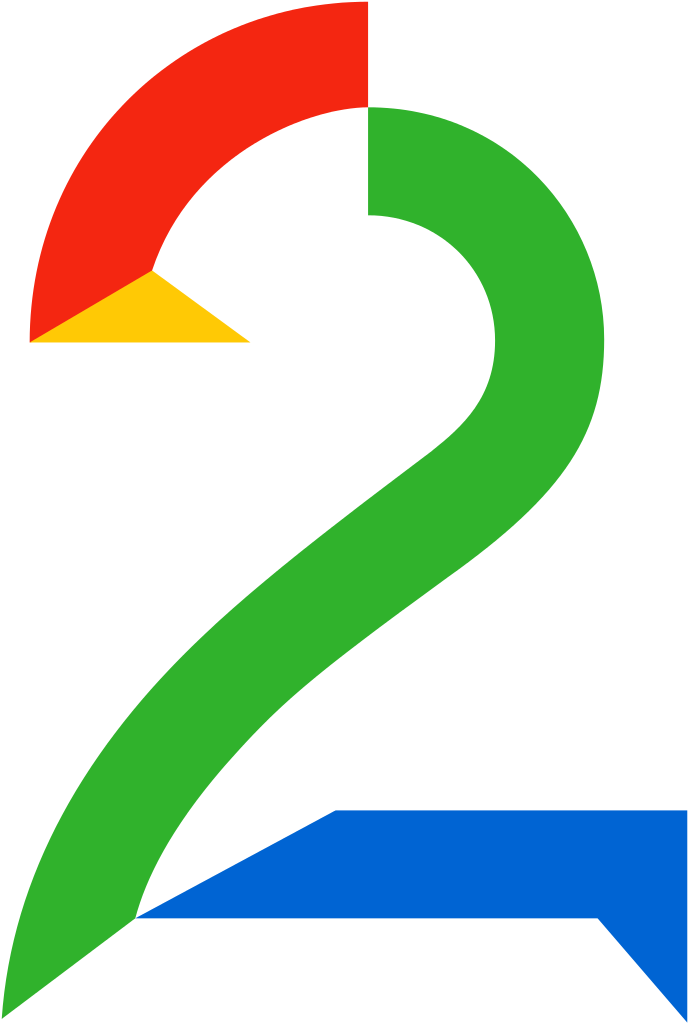
TV2 logo (2013–2021)

TV2 logo (2021–present)

== Distribution ==
Although TV 2 is a terrestrial channel, a paid subscription with RiksTV is required to view the channel in that manner. The channel is also available on cable, satellite, and IPTV platforms nationwide as well as selected pay-TV platforms in neighbouring Sweden and Denmark.

== See also ==
- List of Norwegian television channels
- List of programmes broadcast by TV 2 (Norway)
- TV 2 Nyhetene
