= Largeur.com =

Online magazine

- Founded: Geneva, Switzerland (19 April 1999)
- Key people: Pierre Grosjean, Gabriel Sigrist (founders)
- Products: Online magazine
- Website: http://www.largeur.com

Largeur.com is an online magazine. published by the Swiss media agency LargeNetwork.

== History ==
On 19 April 1999, two Swiss journalists, Pierre Grosjean and Gabriel Sigrist, created Largeur.com, an online magazine which publishes investigations, columns and news reports on a daily basis. Organized under five headings (Glocal, Kapital, Pop Culture, Technophile and Latitudes), the articles focus on new trends, original viewpoints and exclusive information Largeur.com soon expanded into a media agency which produces original content for Swiss media publications and magazines, books and other products (print and online) for companies and other institutions. In July 2009, these activities were grouped into a new entity, LargeNetwork. The online magazine retained its original name.

Grosjean and Sigrist were previously involved in the creation of the daily newspaper Le Temps and both worked for Le Nouveau Quotidien.
