= FACTS (magazine) =

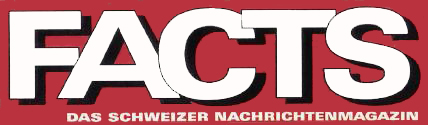
- Categories: News magazine
- Frequency: Weekly
- Publisher: Tamedia Publications
- Founded: 1995
- Company: Tamedia Group
- Country: Switzerland
- Based in: Zurich
- Language: German language
- ISSN: 1422-9986

FACTS was a weekly news magazine from Switzerland owned by Tamedia. The weekly published between 1995 and 2007 as German Magazine. In 2008 it became a linguistics magazine.

== History and profile ==
FACTS was established by Tamedia AG in 1995. The magazine initially oriented itself after the German magazine Focus until it obtained its own profile. It was among the leading news magazines in Switzerland. The magazine was published on a weekly basis in German and was part of Tamedia.

In Spring 2002, the magazine was banned from the planes of the Swiss International Air Lines following the publication of an article criticizing the company.

The main competitor of FACTS was the weekly Weltwoche. In 1997, FACTS had a circulation of 103,424 copies. In 2005, the magazine had a circulation of about 73,000 copies, with a reader reachout of about 440,000 readers.

== See also ==
- List of magazines in Switzerland
