= Lillian Achom =

Ugandan information systems professional

- Born: Uganda
- Education: Uganda Institute of Information & Communications Technology (Diploma in Information Technology); Africa University, Zimbabwe (BSc in Computer Information Systems)
- Occupations: Information systems professional, technology entrepreneur, digital inclusion advocate
- Employer: AccessPluss
- Organization: AccessPluss
- Known for: Digital inclusion advocacy, community networks, women's digital empowerment, affordable internet access
- Notable work: AFCHIX–USAID Women Connect Challenge; African Women in Computing Role Models Project
- Title: Founder and Director, AccessPluss
- Website: accesspluss.org

Lillian Achom is a Ugandan information systems professional, technology enthusiast, and digital inclusion advocate for affordable connectivity in underserved communities and equal economic development. She is the director and founder of AccessPluss, a non-governmental organisation that focuses on teaching women and girls about the benefits of the Internet and how to use it safely.

== Education ==
She completed a Diploma in Information Technology, and later earned a Bachelor of Science in Computer Information Systems from Africa University in Zimbabwe, where she studied from 2008 to 2012. From 2000 to 2001, she obtained a Diploma in Information Technology (Science) (Information Technology) from Uganda Institute of Information & Communications Technology (UICT). From 2000 to 2001, she attended Mariam High School, where she earned her Uganda Advanced Certificate of Education.

== Career ==
She worked as the project manager at AFCHIX, where she led the implementation of the project that profiled African women in computing role models and the AFCHIX-USAID Women Connect Challenge, a project focused on establishing four women-led community networks (CNs) and providing internet services to women (and men) in rural and peri-urban communities of Kenya, Namibia, Senegal and Morocco.In 2021 to 2023, she worked at USAID as a Gender Digital Specialist Independent Consultant. She was the team leader of Afchix Uganda, and founder of eHub Uganda.She was a project manager for Computers for Schools Kenya in Nairobi, which also ran TechSoup. She attended the Summit on Community Networks (CNs) in Africa. She participated in the Network Monitoring and Management by AFNOG and Network Startup Resource Center while working at AFCHIX.

In 2019, while working as the program mamnger for AFCHIX, Achom was invited to the White House to meet Ivanka Trump, who was then an advisor to her father, President Trump and to attend the W-GDP announcement. She was one of nine grantees who were invited to the White House, where President Trump signed the memorandum in the Oval House on February 7, 2019 where Trump's administration pledged $50 million to W-GDP to be allocated by USAID.Following the funding cuts by USAID, Achom was interviewed by several media houses such as CNN, and CBS News on the impact of the funding cuts for women's empowerment.As an information technology entrepreneur, she has mentored young girls in Uganda.

== See also ==
- WOUGNET
- Sarah Kiden
