= Lillian Nalwoga =

Ugandan researcher

Lillian Nalwoga is a Ugandan researcher and policy analyst working at E-Lab Uganda a software company delivering technology solutions for businesses and organizations. Lillian has served at Internet Society Uganda Chapter as president and now leads the Secretariat at Internet Society Uganda Chapter with a focus on Internet Governance Forum, a convening of multi-stakeholders in the Internet Ecosystem to discus policy and regional internet issues.

Lillian is the program manager for Collaboration on International ICT Policy for East and Southern Africa (CIPESA) a regional organisation working at the intersection of amplifying Information and Communication Technology policies to improve digital rights and reduce Internet Shutdowns in Africa.

== See also ==
- Sarah Kiden
- Science and Technology in Uganda
