= Women's Strike of 14 June 1991 =

Nationwide women's strike in Switzerland on June 14, 1991, for gender equality

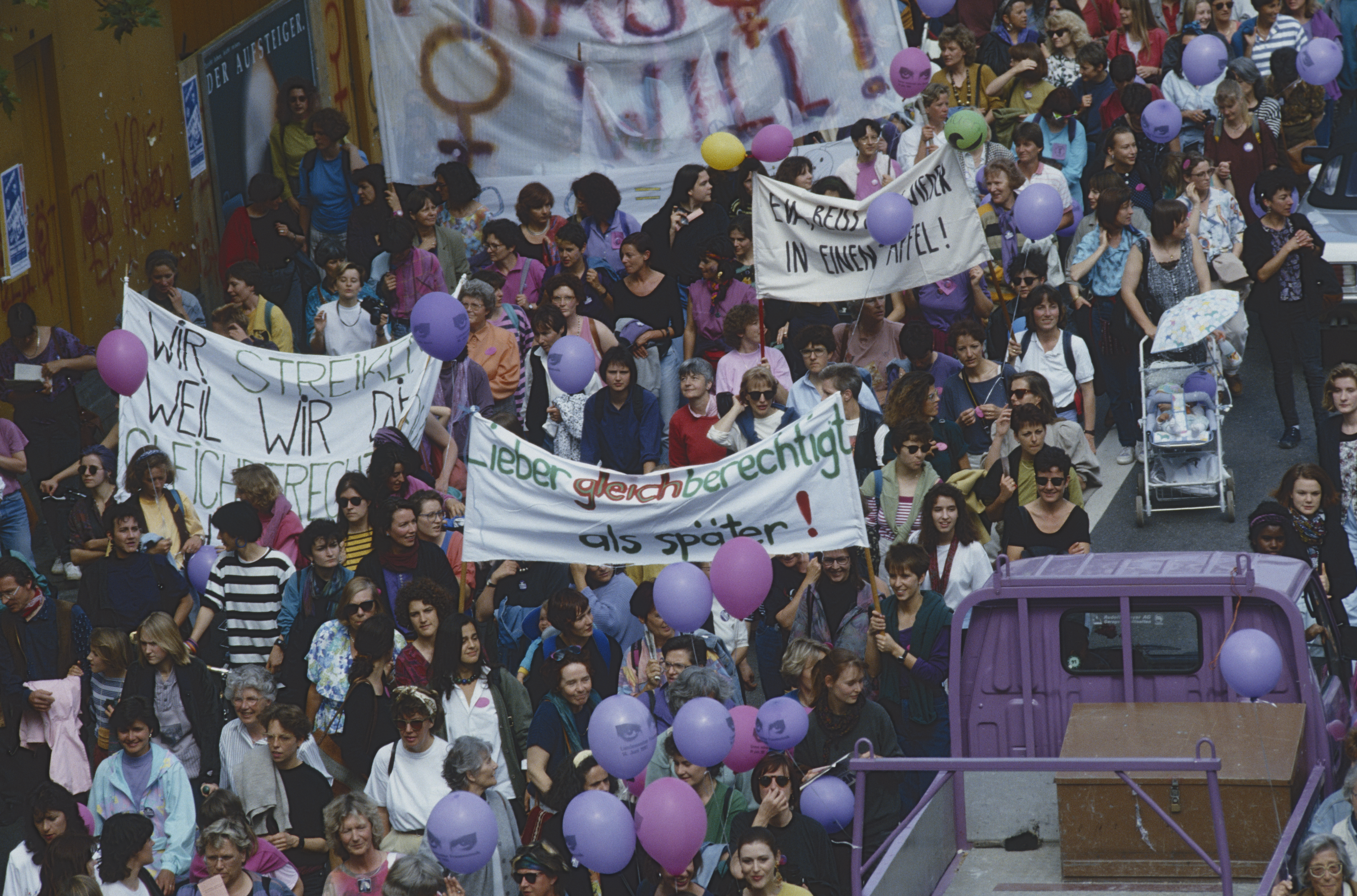
- Women's strike in Zurich.
- Date: 14 June 1991
- Location: Switzerland
- Caused by: Improvement of women's rights in Switzerland
- Methods: Strike and protests

Parties
Swiss Trade Union Federation

Number
500,000	

The Women's Strike of 1991 took place in Switzerland and involved over 500,000 women. Initiated by the Swiss Trade Union Federation (USS), this strike aimed to enforce the federal constitutional article on gender equality adopted ten years earlier on 1981. The day of 14 June 1991 is generally seen as the catalyst for the legislative implementation of the aforementioned article, which occurred in 1996.

== Background ==
Ten years after the inclusion of gender equality in the Swiss Constitution, the general observation was that it was not being enforced, and wage equality had not been achieved.

Watchmakers from the Vallée de Joux were at the origin of the strike. The original idea is attributed to trade unionist Liliane Valceschini, who discussed it with Christiane Brunner, then secretary of the Unia. Brunner succeeded in convincing the Swiss Trade Union Federation, which, despite opposition from some men, approved the initiative on 1990 and opted for a strike rather than a day of action. A national strike committee was formed in 1990, followed by cantonal organizing groups.

The USS then organized the movement at the federal level to mark the 10 years (320 Ms) anniversary of the inclusion of gender equality in the Federal Constitution following the popular vote on 1981, to demand its concrete implementation:

Men and women have equal rights. The law shall ensure equality, particularly in the areas of family, education, and work. Men and women are entitled to equal pay for work of equal value.

— Accepted in the popular vote of 14 June 1981.

The union initiative was joined by the new Frauenbefreiungsbewegung, the Organisation pour la cause des femmes (Ofra), Frauen macht Politik! (Frap!), the Swiss Association for Women's Suffrage, the Swiss Workers' Socialist Party (Trotskyist), the Socialist Party (PS), the non-partisan committee for the realization of equal rights, and many women without political, union, or associative affiliations. Financial and material support was provided by trade unions.

At the cantonal level, organization was often decentralized and sometimes took the form of collectives, such as in the Canton of Geneva, where the “14 June collective” was formed in autumn 1990 and continued its actions after 1991.

Some employers threatened retaliation and dismissal, arguing that the strike challenged the Swiss concept of industrial peace.

== Demands ==
The 14 June manifesto outlined nine demands for the strike:

- Implementation of the law of 1981
- Equal pay
- Protection against sexual harassment in the workplace
- Creation of opportunities for training, professional development, retraining, and career advancement
- Prohibition of night and Sunday work for both women and men
- Creation of affordable daycare and childcare systems
- Equal sharing of family responsibilities between women and men
- Respect for women in society, particularly the right to be free from sexual abuse and violence

== Consequences ==
The strike had significant repercussions in Switzerland. Nearly half a million women, or one in four, took to the streets to protest.

=== Media coverage ===
The strike was covered by Swiss and international media, with the Pravda, the official newspaper of the Communist Party in the USSR, dedicating an article to the event. The Soviet newspaper’s article, which expressed surprise at Switzerland’s lag in women's rights, was in turn quoted by the Swiss press, citing the following:

Even in Switzerland, such a prosperous country, there is a reason to strike

— Komsomolskaya Pravda, cited by the Journal de Genève

In French-speaking Switzerland, Valérie Hoffmeyer noted in the Journal de Genève in 1991 that in Geneva, beauticians and hairdressers were overlooked during the strike. On 1991, the Gazette de Lausanne published a feature on gender inequality, addressing the lack of daycare facilities, the strike by women journalists at the Federal Palace, and the Swiss Congress for Women's Interests of 1975 during the International Women's Year, as well as the Rapport de la Commission nationale suisse pour l'Unesco sur la situation de la femme dans la famille L'Hebdo also published a double opinion piece on the topic.

=== Creation of the Federal Law on Gender Equality ===
In 1996, the constitutional article on equality was legislatively implemented, largely due to the strike of 1991: the Gender Equality Act (LEg).

The day of 14 June has remained an emblematic day for the fight for women's rights in Switzerland, particularly around themes of equality. Every year, actions are organized on 14 June in favor of gender equality, especially regarding equal pay. On 2011, another nationwide demonstration was organized to celebrate, among other things, the 20 years (630 Ms) anniversary of this event.

== Women's Strike of 14 June 2019 ==
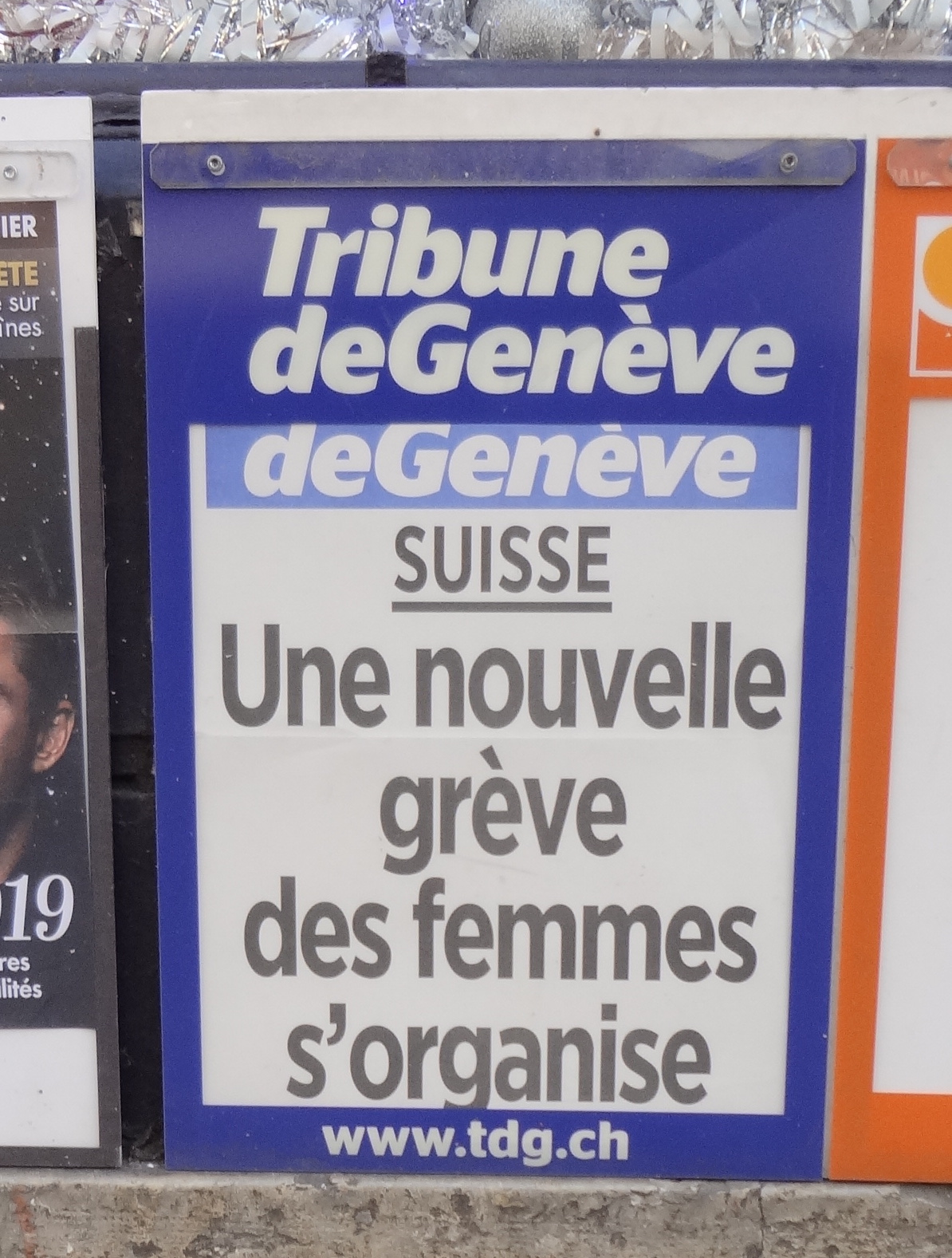
Front page of the Tribune de Genève.

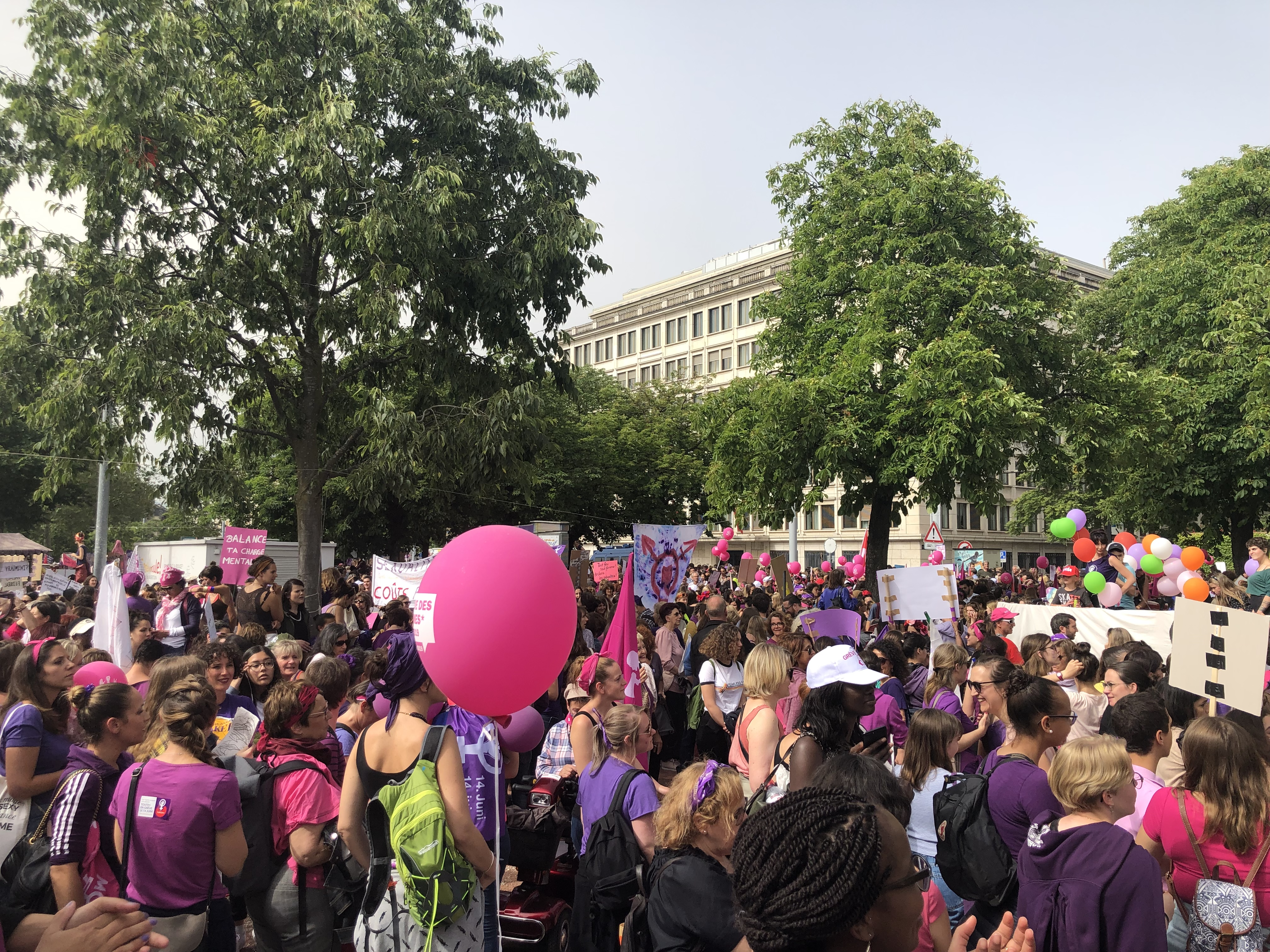
Gathering at the Plaine de Plain-Palais for the Women's Strike of 14 June 2019.

In 2019, a reiteration of the strike took place across Switzerland, again bringing together over 500,000 women.

== See also ==
- 1991 in Switzerland
- History of Switzerland in the 20th century
- Gender pay gap
- Lausanne
- Women's suffrage in Switzerland

== Bibliography ==
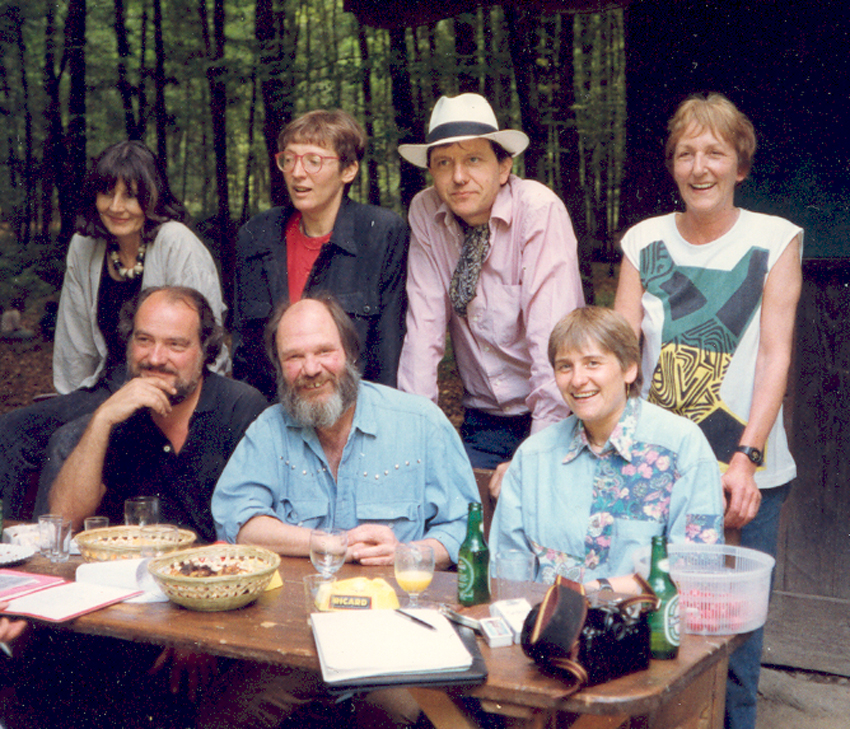
The Éditions d'en bas group in June 1991.

- Collectif (1991). Mieux qu'un rêve, une grève !: la grève des femmes du 14 juin 1991 en Suisse [Better than a dream, a strike!: The women's strike of 14 June 1991 in Switzerland] (in French). Éditions d'en bas. p. 140. ISBN 9782829001338.
- Brigitte Studer (12 June 2019). "Grève des femmes (1991)" [Women's Strike (1991)]. Historical Dictionary of Switzerland (in French). Translated by Dominique Quadroni. 058286.
- Emilie Gasc; Victoire Tuaillon (1 June 2019). "Les podcasts de La Grève des femmes, Suisse repetita" [Podcasts of the Women's Strike, Switzerland Repeated] (mp3). rts.ch/podcasts-originaux and www.binge.audio (in French).
- "L'évolution du droit des femmes en Suisse de 1971 à 2020" [The evolution of women's rights in Switzerland from 1971 to 2020]. Le Temps (in French). 7 February 2021. ISSN 1423-3967.
- Clio Devantéry (2021). "Rejouer un même pourtant si différent du 14 juin 1991 au 14 juin 2019, la grève des femmes vue par 24 Heures" [Reenacting a similar yet so different event from 14 June 1991 to 14 June 2019, the women's strike as seen by 24 Heures]. Revue historique vaudoise (in French). pp. 135–145. ISSN 1013-6924.
