= Cenobio =

- Editor-in-chief: Pietro Montorfani
- Categories: Literary magazine
- Frequency: Quarterly
- Founded: 1952; 73 years ago
- Country: Switzerland
- Based in: Lugano
- Language: Italian
- Website: Cenobio
- ISSN: 0008-896X
- OCLC: 714106101

Cenobio is an Italian language quarterly literary magazine based in Lugano, Canton Ticino, Switzerland. It is the largest literary magazine in the Italian speaking part of Switzerland.

== History and profile ==
The magazine was founded by Pier Riccardo Frigeri in 1952. After his retirement in 2002, Manuel Rossello became the editor-in-chief until 2007, followed by Pietro Montorfani in 2008. Its current editor-in-chief is Pietro Montorfani.

Cenobio is published on a quarterly basis.

== See also ==
- List of magazines in Switzerland
- List of literary magazines
