= Schweizer Familie =

Swiss weekly family magazine

- Logo
- Editor-in-chief: Daniel Dunkel
- Categories: Family magazine
- Frequency: Weekly
- Founded: 1893; 133 years ago
- Company: Tamedia (TX Group)
- Country: Switzerland
- Based in: Zürich
- Language: German
- Website: Schweizer Familie
- OCLC: 1286900271

Schweizer Familie (German: Swiss Family) is a weekly family magazine published in Switzerland. Founded in 1893, it is one of the oldest magazines in the country.

== History and profile ==
Schweizer Familie was established in 1893. For one year it was distributed as a supplement of Die Glatt, a local newspaper based in Zürich. The magazine became a stand-alone publication in 1894.

Schweizer Familiedescribes itself as "the family magazine of German speaking Switzerland". It is published weekly on Wednesdays and has its headquarters in Zürich and is part of Tamedia AG, which acquired it in 1933. In 1971, another title of the company, Schweizer Heim, was merged with Schweizer Familie.

Schweizer Familie covers such topics as extraordinary figures, travel, nature, health, wellness, fashion and lifestyle. The magazine has a supplement, TV Täglich. It organizes an annual National Hiking Day.

In 2014, Daniel Dunkel was the editor-in-chief of Schweizer Familie.

== Circulation ==
The circulation of Schweizer Familie was more than 300,000 copies in 1974. Between July 2004 and June 2005 the magazine sold 171,905 copies. It rose to 175,643 copies between July 2005 and June 2006 and 179,275 copies between July 2006 and June 2007. Its circulation again rose to 182,866 copies between July 2007 and June 2008.

Schweizer Familie was the third best-selling magazine in Switzerland with a circulation of 185,174 copies in 2009. It rose to 191,262 copies in 2010 and to 193,125 copies in 2011. Its 2012 circulation was 192,853 copies. The magazine sold 174,538 copies in 2014 and had a readership of 660,000 in the second half of 2014.

The number of its readers was 577,000 in 2018. The paid circulation of Schweizer Familie was 119,026 copies in the first quarter of 2023.

== See also ==
- List of magazines in Switzerland
