= Vapentidningen =

Swedish firearms magazine

Vapentidningen (Firearms Journal) is a Swedish firearms magazine published in Norway, Sweden and Denmark since 1994. The magazine is directed towards shooters, hunters and collectors, with material covering general firearm and weapons news, product tests, buying guides and historical articles. The magazine is currently published 12 times a year. Since 2010, the magazine has been published by Tidningen HiFi musik AB in Solna. Between 1994 and 2010, the magazine was published by Tidningen Jakt & vapen AB in Stockholm.

== See also ==
- Villmarksliv Norwegian hunting magazine
- Svensk Jakt Swedish hunting and wildlife magazine
