= Matteo Cheda =

Matteo Cheda (1968, Locarno) is a Swiss journalist. He is the founder of the consumer magazines Spendere Meglio (1996), L'Inchiesta (1999) and Scelgo io (2002).

Alumnus of the ETH Zürich, he started his career writing for the local newspaper Eco di Locarno then for the daily LaRegione Ticino, as parliament correspondent in Bern.

Consumer rights, quality tests and price comparisons have been Cheda's main area of interest. He published books on various consumer topics including health insurance and labour law.
