= Hasnawi =

Hasnawi (also spelled Hasnaoui, Arabic: حسناوي) is an Arabic family name, it may refer to:

- Cheikh El Hasnaoui, Algerian singer
- Nadia Hasnaoui, Norwegian television presenter
- Mithal al-Hasnawi, Iraqi terror suspect
- Salih al-Hasnawi, Iraqi doctor and politician
