= TV 2 Nyhetene =

Norwegian television news program

TV 2 Nyhetene is Norway's TV 2 Direkte regular news that has been shown every day since the start of 1992, at 18:30 and at 21:00. There used to be a shorter newscast that ran around midnight, but ended around the time TV 2 Nyheter started. The 21:00 news was voted the Gullruten 2004 best current affairs program (news, sports and debate).

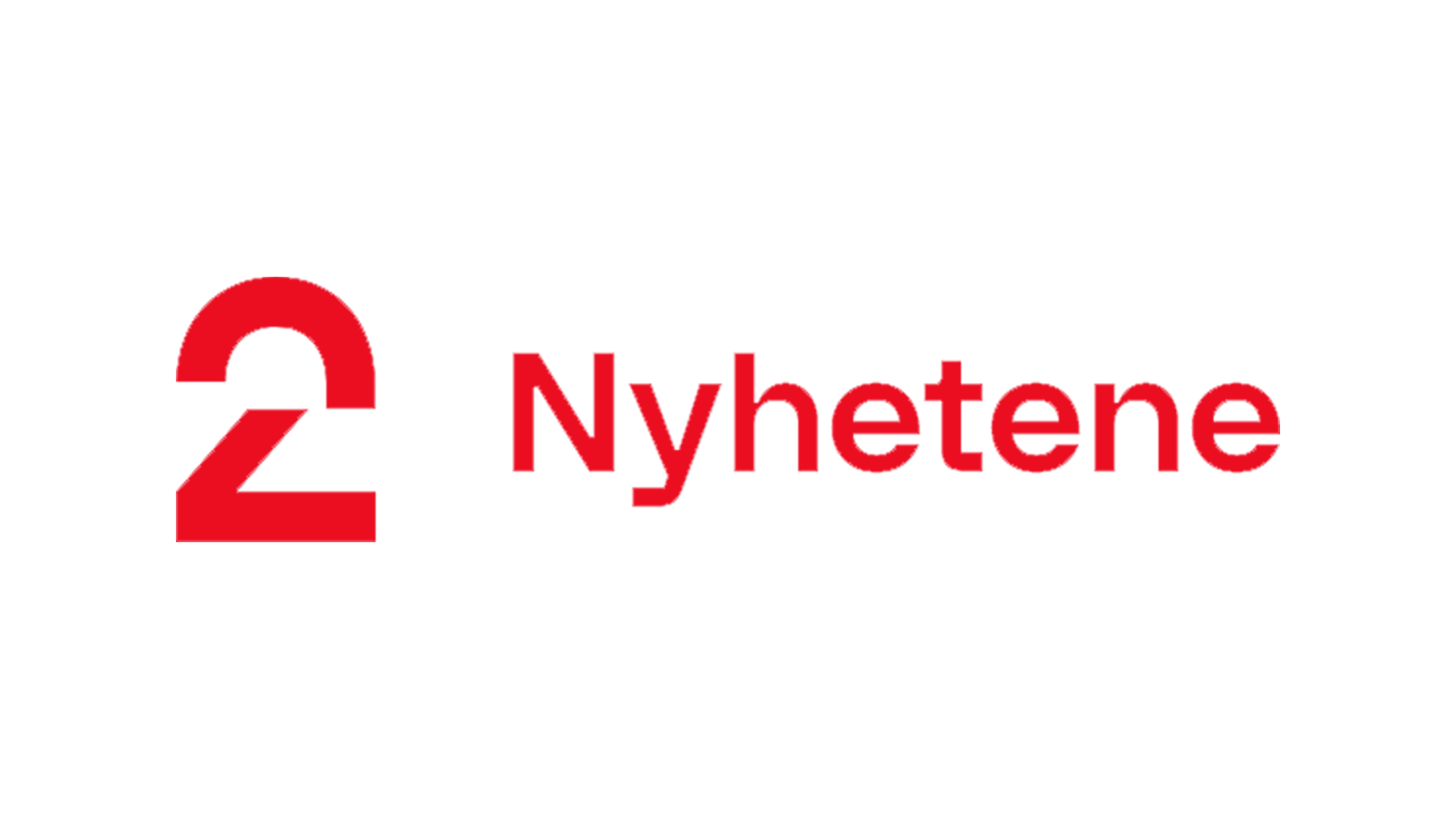
Logo of TV 2 Nyhetene used since 2021.

== News readers ==
- Siri Lill Mannes
- Sturla Dyregrov
- Pål T. Jørgensen
- Espen Fiveland
- Mah-Rukh Ali
- Kjetil H. Dale
- Morten Sandøy
- Christine Korme

=== Former news readers ===
- Connie Barr (1992–2001)
- Nils Gunnar Lie
- Jarl Borgvin Dørre
