= Business Mir =

- Categories: Magazine
- Frequency: Quarterly
- Founded: 2006; 20 years ago
- Based in: Geneva
- Language: English, Russian
- Website: businessmir.ch

Business Mir is a bilingual (English/Russian) magazine based in Switzerland. It focuses on topics covering the political, economic and social links between Russia, Switzerland and Europe. The magazine has been published in Geneva since 2006 and is distributed in numerous European countries (Switzerland, Great Britain, France, Germany, Austria, the Czech Republic, etc.) as well as in the United States, Canada and Israel.

Business Mir targets an audience of Swiss, Russian and European investors, financial players, travellers and businessmen. Business Mir publishes in-depth articles on the economic developments and business opportunities in Russia as well as Russia's ties to Western industries, new markets and high-stakes energy issues. Business Mir also features lifestyle articles providing selections of the finest hotels, restaurants, spas, private clinics, banks, etc.

Business Mir also publishes an online news platform providing high added-value economic, political and cultural information which is updated daily.

== See also ==
- List of magazines in Switzerland
