= Spendere Meglio =

Spendere Meglio (English: Spend Better)
- Categories: Consumer magazine
- Circulation: 12,000 (as of 2016).
- Founder: Matteo Cheda
- First issue: February 1996
- Country: Switzerland
- Based in: Bellinzona, Ticino
- Language: Italian
- Website: consumatori.ch
- ISSN: 1424-6031
- OCLC: 723895524

Spendere Meglio (English: Spend Better) is a Swiss Italian-language consumer magazine, published in Bellinzona, Ticino.

Founded by the journalist Matteo Cheda in February 1996, the magazine's circulation was 12,000 in 2016.

== See also ==
- List of magazines in Switzerland
