= Gender Equality Act (Switzerland) =

Swiss law promoting equal rights and opportunities for men and women

Gender Equality Act (GEA)
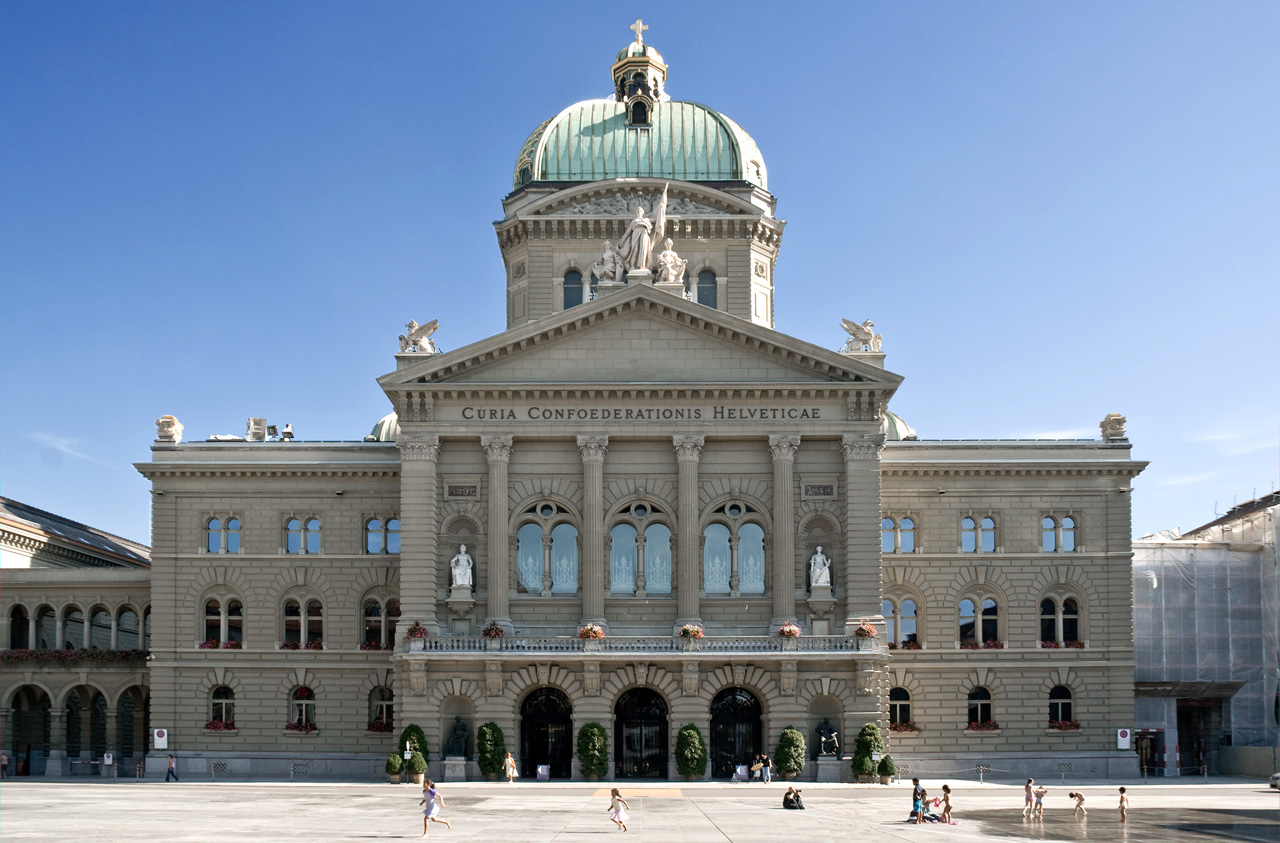

Federal Assembly of Switzerland
- Long title: Federal Act on Gender Equality (SR 151.1)
- Territorial extent: Switzerland
- Enacted by: Federal Assembly of Switzerland
- Enacted: 24 March 1995
- Commenced: 1 July 1996
- Status: Current legislation

The Gender Equality Act (GEA) (Note: German: Gleichstellungsgesetz, GlG; French: Loi sur l’égalité, LEg; Italian: Legge federale sulla parità dei sessi, LPar) is a Swiss federal law that aims to promote equal rights and opportunities for men and women. It prohibits in particular any form of discrimination between women and men in employment relationships. The law also establishes the Federal Office for Gender Equality (FOGE) and defines its tasks. The law was adopted on 24 March 1995 by the Federal Assembly and came into force on 1 July 1996.

The equality of rights between men and women was enshrined in the Swiss constitution in 1981, through art. para 3. which states that:

"the law shall ensure their equality, both in law and in practice, most particularly in the family, in education, and in the workplace. Men and women have the right to equal pay for work of equal value".

The introduction of GEA concretizes this mandate, while also transposing EEA law into Swiss law to increase the "eurocompatibility of the Swiss legal system".

== Main rules ==
The prohibition of discrimination based on gender applies in particular to hiring, assignment of tasks, adjustment of working conditions, remuneration, training and professional development, promotion and termination of employment relationships.

Article 3 is the fundamental element of the law:

"Employees must not be discriminated against on the basis of their sex, whether directly or indirectly, including on the basis of their marital status, their family situation or, in the case of female employees, of pregnancy."

Indirect discrimination and direct discrimination are not further defined in the law in this regard. "Appropriate measures aimed at achieving true equality are not regarded as discriminatory" (art. 3, para. 3).

Sexual harassment in the workplace, which is considered discriminatory behaviour, is also prohibited (art. 4).

Article 5 defines the rights of the persons concerned. In particular, they are entitled to compensation and, depending on the case, to bring an action for damages and compensation for moral harm. The compensation is fixed on the basis of the average Swiss salary and taking into account the circumstances. It does not exceed three to six months' salary. The workers can ask the competent authority to establish the existence of the discrimination, to stop and prohibit it and to order the payment of the salary due (with retroactive effect up to five years).

To make it easier for the injured parties, the law provides for the reduction of the burden of proof in important areas: the existence of discrimination is "presumed if the person concerned can substantiate the same by prima facie evidence" (art. 6). The reduced burden of proof is not applicable in cases of sexual harassment or discrimination in hiring.

The law also aims to facilitate the enforcement of existing legal rights by granting standing to organizations. This means that "organisations that have been in existence for at least two years and that have as their object in terms of their articles of incorporation the promotion of gender equality or safeguarding the interests of employees" may, under certain conditions, initiate proceedings or bring an action without the discriminated persons having to expose themselves (art. 7).

Workers who file complaints and initiate proceedings under the Gender Equality Act are protected from threats of termination of their employment contract from the beginning of the proceedings (whether internal or external to the company) and for six months after the conclusion of the proceedings (articles 9 and 10).

Companies with more than 100 employees to conduct an equal pay analysis every four years (art 13a). Public or private organizations that set up incentive programs to promote equality between women and men in working life may apply for financial assistance (art. 14). The law also establishes the Federal Office for Gender Equality (FOGE) and defines its tasks (art. 16).

== See also ==
- Swiss labour law
- Federal Office for Gender Equality (FOGE)
- Women's Strike of 14 June 1991
