= Swiss Derivatives Review =

Swiss Derivatives Review (SDR) was a professional magazine for the futures and options industries.

== History and profile ==
The Swiss Derivatives Review was first published in 1997 and was issued three times a year. The publisher was Weber-Thedy AG and it was headquartered in Zurich.

The SDR was official publication of the Swiss Futures and Options Association (SFOA), the Association of Futures Markets (AFM), and the Swiss Association of Market Technicians (SAMT). The SDR was distributed free to members and friends of the above associations as well as at important industry events and congregations. The magazine had a print run of about 10,000 copies and reached on average over 20,000 readers globally.

The objective of the SDR was to update on the above associations’ activities as well as to provide news and information on the derivatives industry, exchanges and key market players. It was last published in Spring 2014.
