= Swiss labour law =

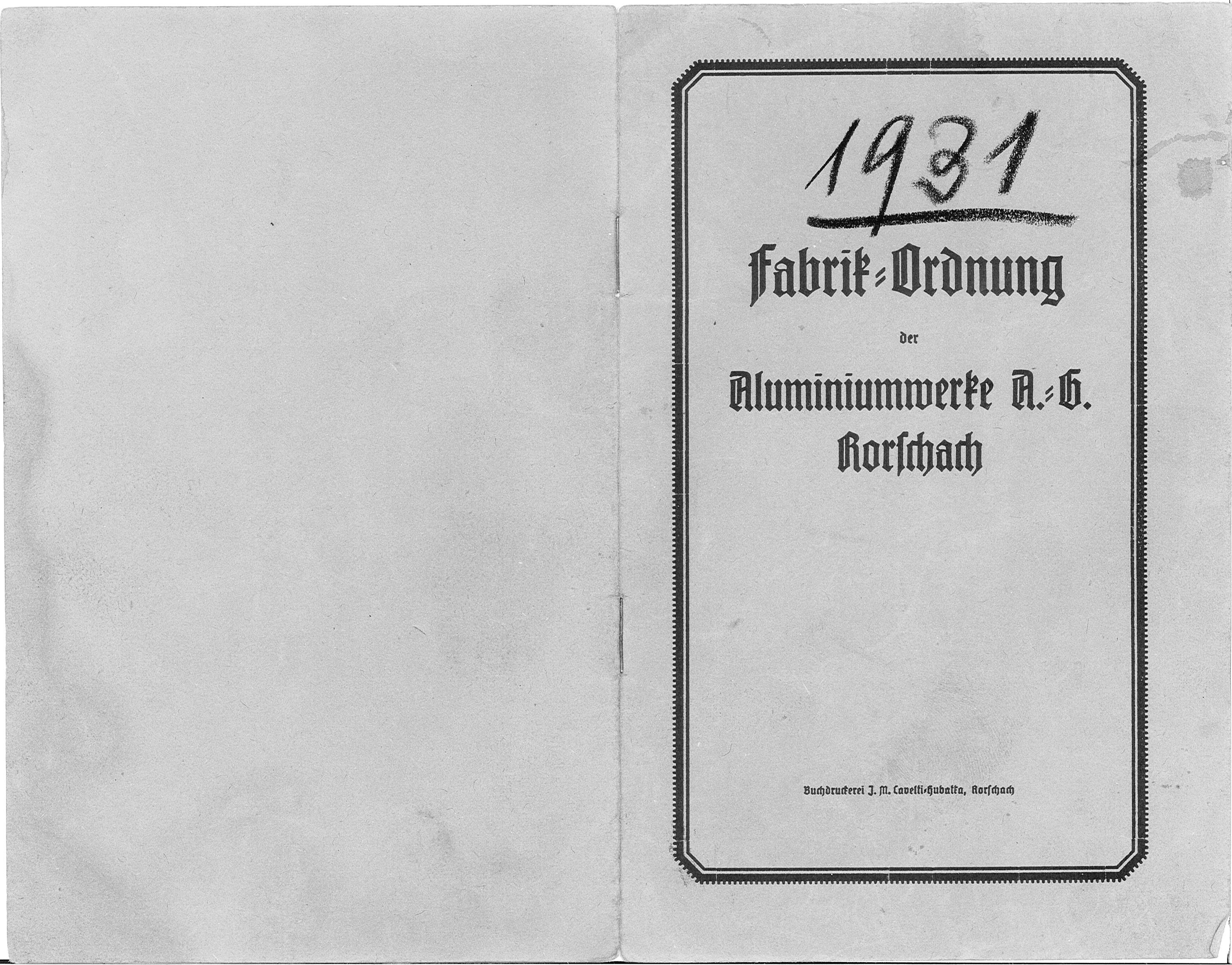

The Swiss labor law covers all standards governing the employment of some kind. The regulation of the employment by private employers is largely harmonized at the federal level, while public-sector employment still prevails a variety of cantonal laws. In particular, the civil standardization is distributed to a variety of laws. Of greater importance, particularly the new Federal Constitution of 1999, the Code of Obligations, the Labour Code as well as in the public sector, the Federal Personnel Act.

== Legal sources ==
The following laws define the conditions under which people in Switzerland may be employed:

- The new Swiss Federal Constitution regulates some normative principles and the skills of the individual authorities, namely the competence of the Confederation and the cantons.
- Fundamentally, the individual labor contract law, is written down in the Swiss Code of Obligations (OR). Basically is bases on the agreement between employers and employees. However, a number of basic legal norms (necessary norms) must be respected, and have precedence in case of dispute. The collective labor agreement for its part, is also set in its environment in the OR.
- The Federal Law declaring collective agreements governs the official ways to declare collective agreements for industries and companies binding.
- Also compelling public law is the labor law is that the employee-side guarantees minimum protection standards regarding working hours. Today, it is usually undercut by collective employment arrangements.
- The Health Protection at Work shall not apply in Switzerland as labor law, but is treated under the accident insurance law (SUVA).
- The working conditions of foreign workers (ISVA minimum standards in employment contracts) are posted only for individual projects / assignments in Switzerland. It is mainly wage and social dumping prevention.
- The federal law against undeclared work to prevent this regard abuses by employers 'and workers' side.
- If the State is the employer, the primary provisions of public law must be observed. The private law rules are only a subsidiary or analog-applied law. Since the cantons in the arrangement of their administrative law are largely autonomous, all cantons have their own regulations for public employment. At the federal level, the Federal Personnel Act (BPG) in particular and as far as liability issues are concerned to note the Government Liability Act (VG).
- The Gender Equality Act (GEA) prohibits any form of discrimination between women and men

== See also ==
- Labor law

== Bibliography ==
- Thomas Geiser and Roland Müller (2009), Arbeitsrecht in der Schweiz, Stämpfli, ISBN 978-3727286506
- Louis Carlen: Zur Geschichte des Arbeitsrechts in der Schweiz. Vom Mittelalter bis zum 19. Jahrhundert, in Zeitschrift für Schweizerisches Recht, Band 91, 1972
