= Technologist (magazine) =

- Categories: Popular science
- Frequency: Four times per year
- Circulation: 46'000
- Publisher: Eurotech Universities
- Founded: 2014
- Final issue: 2019
- Based in: Geneva
- Language: English, French and German
- Website: www.technologist.eu
- ISSN: 2296-8709

Technologist was a European popular science magazine published by Eurotech Universities beginning in June 2014. It was produced by the Swiss media agency LargeNetwork and published in English, French and German. It was based in Geneva and sold in twenty countries. When accessed on 11 December, 2019, its website referred to itself in the past tense. The archives remain available online, with 17 from early in 2019 and many dozens more from 2014 through 2018.

== See also ==
- List of magazines in Switzerland
