= World Radio Switzerland =

- Switzerland
- Frequency: DAB+
- Branding: WRS

Programming
- Format: News/talk and popular music
- Affiliations: BBC World Service

Ownership
- Owner: Cedra Ventures via Aube Ondes SA

History
- First air date: 5 November 2007

Links
- Website: www.worldradio.ch

World Radio Switzerland (WRS) is the only 24-hour, English-language broadcast radio station in Switzerland.

Until October 2013, it broadcast on 101.7 MHz FM in the Lake Geneva region, and now continues on DAB+ digital radio across Switzerland. It can also be heard through live streaming on the WRS website, internet radio hubs and mobile apps.

== Administration ==
WRS is owned by Aube Ondes SA, registered in Geneva. The radio station's legal headquarters are at 50, Rue Rothschild, 1202 Genève, in Geneva, Switzerland.

== History ==
In the late 1980s, the Swiss Broadcasting Corporation (SRG SSR) decided that an English-language radio station in Geneva would enhance its international reputation and provide a useful service to the international organizations established in the city. To that end, SRG SSR applied to the Federal Office of Communications for an FM frequency. The first application, made in 1992, was rejected. The application was resubmitted in 1995 and then granted. However, by that time the Federal Office of Communications made it clear that all new radio stations had to be commercial.

World Radio Geneva began broadcasting on 25 June 1996 and officially ended on 12 October 2007 after a change in the law integrated the radio station into the Swiss public service. World Radio Switzerland launched on 5 November 2007 as a public service broadcaster, available on digital radio across Switzerland.

In 2012, WRS' parent corporation, SRG SSR, announced its intention to privatise the station. As of December 2012, there were two bidders for the broadcaster.

In 2013 the station was privatised and sold by SRG SSR to Anglo Media Group.

The name "WRS" and some features of the former public service broadcaster were retained by Anglo Media Group, which had previously operated an internet station: Radio Frontier. The broadcasting on FM 101.7 MHz covering the Western part of the lake Geneva area stopped on 1 October 2013 while the DAB+ signal covering the Swiss French Speaking region and the Swiss German Speaking region continues alongside internet, mobile and WRS app listening.

WRS currently produces live presented programmes across each day, additional lifestyle contributed programmes, together with hourly international news and thematic programmes from the BBC World Service.

The WRS website contains the station's programme offerings, local Swiss news, an events calendar, a local directory, property advertising and a classifieds section.

On 12th May 2025, it was announced that WRS is for sale.

On 23rd April 2026, it was announced that the station had been acquired by Cedra Ventures through its special purpose vehicle Aube Ondes SA.

== Types of listeners ==
Listeners of WRS live across Switzerland, and in over 100 additional countries, with core listening audiences in the cantons of Geneva and Vaud, neighbouring border areas of France, Zurich, Basel, Zug and Luzerne. Countries of origin include Switzerland, France, the United Kingdom, the United States, Canada and Australia. According to a federal census, 739,000 Swiss speak English at work (16.9% of the working population).

== Station Awards ==
In 2005, WRG - World Radio Geneva - was awarded 'Radio Station of the Year' as part of Swiss Radio Day.

In 2012, WRS was awarded 'Radio Station of the Year' as part of Swiss Radio Day. The award is given to one station in the German-speaking, and one in the French and Italian-speaking regions of the country for biggest net listener increase.

In 2013, while still part of the Swiss Broadcasting Corporation, WRS won five regional Edward R. Murrow Awards from the Radio Television Digital News Association. The awards for broadcast journalism were presented for a small-market, international station. Award-winning stories included a series reported from revolutionary Egypt, a newscast after a tragic bus crash in Valais, and continuing coverage about Swiss banks, among others.

In the summer of 2013, WRS was awarded 'Radio Station of the Year' for the third time and the second year in succession for its percentage increase in listener audience.

In 2014, WRS won three regional RTDNA Edward R. Murrow Awards for work completed before the station was privatised. The winning entries include a report on "The Gender Gap" produced at the World Economic Forum's annual meeting in Davos; a pair of reports about an Alpine river that died after a dam incident; and a report about Switzerland's first stand-alone Hindu temple.
