= Mithal al-Hasnawi =

Iraqi Sheikh

Sheikh Mithal al-Hasnawi (Arabic: مثال الحسناوي) was a representative of radical cleric Muqtada al-Sadr in Karbala, before being captured by US and Iraqi National Guard troops in a joint operation on July 31, 2004. His brother was also captured in the raid.

== See also ==
- Mahdi Army
