= Bilanz =

Swiss biweekly business magazine

- Editor-in-chief: Dirk Schütz
- Categories: Business magazine
- Frequency: Monthly
- Circulation: 38,387 (2014)
- Publisher: Ringier Medien Schweiz
- Founded: 1977; 49 years ago
- Company: Ringier AG
- Country: Switzerland
- Based in: Zürich
- Language: German
- Website: BILANZ
- ISSN: 1022-3487
- OCLC: 5064515

Bilanz (German: [biˈlant͡s], Balance) is a biweekly business magazine published in Zürich, Switzerland, which has been in circulation since 1977. The magazine started its edition in Germany in 2014.

== History and profile ==
Bilanz was established in 1977 as a successor of Wirtschaftsrevue, a monthly business magazine published between 1962 and 1977. The founding publisher of the magazine was Jean Frey AG. It came out monthly basis when it was started. In 2005, its frequency was switched to biweekly.

The magazine became part of Axel Springer AG in 2007. A subsidiary of the company, Axel Springer Schweiz, publishes the magazine of which headquarters is in Zürich.

As of 2014 Dirk Schütz was the editor-in-chief of Bilanz, which features articles related to companies, analyses of the economic events, investment and management of financial asset. It has published an annual list of the 300 richest Swiss since 1989. Its online edition was restarted in 2009.

Since 2 May 2014, Bilanz has been also published on a monthly basis as a supplement of Die Welt and Welt Kompakt in Germany.

=== Circulation ===
Bilanz sold 34,000 copies in 1981 and 55,000 copies in 1989. Its total readers were 205,000 in 2010. In 2014, the circulation of the biweekly was 38,387 copies.

== See also ==
- List of magazines in Switzerland
