= La Revue de Genève =

Political magazine in Switzerland (1920–1930)

- Editor: Robert de Taz
- Categories: Political magazine
- Founder: Robert de Taz
- Founded: 1920
- First issue: July 1920
- Final issue: 1930
- Country: Switzerland
- Based in: Geneva
- Language: French

La Revue de Genève (French: The Geneva Review) was a political magazine which was published in Geneva, Switzerland, from 1920 to 1930. Its subtitle was Un organe de liaison intellectuelle et de civilisation comparée (French: An organ of intellectual liaison and comparative civilization). The magazine is known for its focus on the idea of Europe.

== History and profile ==
La Revue de Genève was established by the Swiss novelist Robert de Taz in Geneva in 1920. Its editor was also de Taz. The first issue of the magazine appeared in July 1920. It aimed to reinforce the idea of Europe and the European solidarity in the post-war period.

Major contributors of La Revue de Genève included Sigmund Freud, Rainer Maria Rilke, Luigi Pirandello, Benedetto Croce, Franz Hellens and Henry de Montherlant.

La Revue de Genève folded in 1930, and Robert de Taz left Geneva and settled in Paris.
