= Lords of Rock =

Lords of Rock is a Swiss rock online magazine, updated daily. It publishes cd reviews, interviews, reports from festivals and news. It is a collaborative work of about 20 Swiss and French reporters, editors, coordinators and the webmaster. The journal was founded in June 2006 by three people from the Lausanne area in Switzerland.
