= Newly Swissed =

- Editor: Dimitri Burkhard
- Founder: Dimitri Burkhard
- Founded: 2010
- First issue: January 2010
- Country: Switzerland
- Based in: Bubikon
- Language: English
- Website: newlyswissed.com

Newly Swissed is a digital entertainment magazine about Switzerland, first published in January 2010. It covers topics related to culture, design, events, oddities and tourism in Switzerland.

== History ==
Newly Swissed was launched in 2010 by Dimitri Burkhard, a digital marketing expert. The magazine incorporated as Newly Swissed GmbH in 2015. At the time, it was the only online magazine about Switzerland written in English. Newly Swissed is frequently quoted by major publications on the subject of expat life in Switzerland.

In the early stages, observations about Swiss lifestyle and culture served as the main sources of content. Now, the magazine covers a range of topics in-depth, from architecture to oddities, and from tourism to advice on in Switzerland. The publication is primarily concerned with serving the international community in Switzerland, as well as the Swiss population living abroad. Much of the magazine’s success has historically been built on its journalistic coverage of Switzerland from the perspective of multiple writers.

The readership is primarily located in Switzerland, followed by the United States and the United Kingdom.
