= La Salamandre (magazine) =

Revue Salamandre (La Salamandre)
- Categories: Nature
- Frequency: Bi-monthly
- Circulation: 30,000
- Publisher: Éditions de La Salamandre
- Founder: Julien Perrot
- Founded: 1983; 43 years ago
- Country: Switzerland (and France)
- Based in: Neuchâtel
- Language: French
- Website: www.salamandre.net
- ISSN: 1424-4748
- OCLC: 473083132

The Revue Salamandre (named La Salamandre until 2020; English: "The salamander") is a Swiss French-language magazine about nature.

== History and profile ==
La Salamandre was established in 1983 by an 11-year-old boy, Julien Perrot. La Salamandre is a non-profit-making company and its magazines do not contain any advertising. The magazine had 6,000 subscribers in 1997 and 30,000 in 2013, mainly in Switzerland and France.

A nature magazine for children (6-10 years) is also published, in French (La Petite Salamandre; English: "The Little Salamander"). It had 18,000 subscribers in 2013. A German version was also created (Der Kleine Salamander) for German-speaking Switzerland and Germany.

La Salamandre holds a yearly nature festival, the "Festival de la Salamandre". It celebrated its tenth anniversary in 2012. In 2011, La Salamandre also founded annual nature event in Switzerland, the "Fête de la nature".

The magazine regularly has partnerships with the scientific programmes of the Radio suisse romande ("Impatience", "CQFD" and "Prise de terre") and France Inter ("La tête au carré").

== See also ==
- List of magazines in Switzerland
- List of wildlife magazines
