= Posledniya Izvestia =

Posledniya Izvestia was a publication brought out by the Bund Committee Abroad, published in London and Geneva 1901–1906.
