= Juliana (ship) =

Numerous ships have been named Juliana:

- La Juliana (1570 ship) was a merchant vessel launched in 1570 near Barcelona, Spain. King Philip II commandeered her for the Spanish Armada. She wrecked in autumn 1588 at Streedagh Strand, north of the Rosses Point Peninsula on the west coast of Ireland
- Lord Camden (1765 EIC ship) was an East Indiaman that made four voyages for the British East India Company (EIC). Mather & Co. purchased her in 1778, named her Juliana, and chartered her out as an armed escort ship and transport. In 1786 Mather & Co. sold her into the Archangel timber trade.
- Peggy (1793 ship) was built at Calcutta and initially sailed in the Indian coastal and Far East trade. In 1801 she assumed British registry and her name was changed to Juliana. Her owners sold her to the Transport Board but in 1804 the government resold her and she was sailing as a West Indiaman between London and Antigua. She then made two voyages for the British East India Company (EIC), and one voyage to Hobart, Van Dieman's Land, transporting convicts. On her return from this voyage she wrecked in 1821 on the English coast.
- Juliana (1814 ship) was launched at Calcutta in 1814. She spent almost all of her career trading between England and India and made one voyage for the British East India Company (EIC), in 1824–25. She wrecked at Cape Town in 1839 while carrying immigrants from England to Sydney, New South Wales.
- Juliana (1814 Southwick ship), of 16821/94 tons (bm) was launched at Southwick in 1814. By 1817 she had assumed Guernsey registry. On 23 April 1848 she was leaving St Sampson's Harbour with a cargo of stone for London when she sank off Amphré rocks (Amfroque). The pilots on board saved her crew.

== See also ==
- Lady Juliana (1777 ship)
