= Villmarksliv =

Norwegian magazine

Villmarksliv (English translation "Wilderness Life") is a monthly Norwegian magazine about hunting, sport fishing, wildlife and outdoor recreation published by the Danish company Egmont. The magazine is based in Oslo, Norway.

== History and profile ==
The magazine was established in 1973, but also had a trial edition in 1972. The four founders Thorbjørn Tufte, Bjørn Holm-Hansen, Anton Lossius and Olaf Gundersrud with the publisher Naturforlaget AS. During the first years, Tufte and Holm-Hansen shared the position as editor, and changed who were responsible for every other edition. In 1988 Dag Kjelsaas took over the editor position. Today's editor is Knut Brevik, which took over the job in 2005.

In 1992, Hjemmet Mortensen bought the majority of stocks, and took over the operations. Villmarksliv has had columns and articles written by many well known outdoor people, such as Sverre M. Fjelstad and Lars Monsen.

The magazine also published several yearly special editions, such as "Ørretfiske" (Trout Fishing), "Vill mat" (Wildlife-foods) and "Norske naturperler" (Norwegian Nature Beauties).

Villmarksliv also hosts the Norwegian Championship in Nature Photography "NM i naturfoto", and through the whole year readers can view contributions from the best nature photographers competing for prizes.

Villmarksliv also maintain the official Norwegian records for sport fishing called "Sportsfiskerekordene".

== Numbers ==
Confirmed net circulation figures from Norwegian Media Businesses' Association:

- 2011: 36644
- 2012: 34473
- 2013: 32390
- 2014: 30105
- 2015: 28209
- 2016: 26456
- 2017: 24582
- 2018: 21658

== See also ==
- Svensk Jakt Swedish hunting and wildlife magazine
- Vapentidningen Swedish firearms magazine
