= Frauenbefreiungsbewegung =

Swiss women's liberation movement

Frauenbefreiungsbewegung (FBB; French: Mouvement de libération des femmes, MLF; Italian: Movimento femminista ticinese, MFT) was the largest organization of the women's movement in Switzerland after 1968, and in its early days stood as a pars pro toto for all the groups and networks of the so-called new women's movement.

== History ==
In February 1969, a group of women at a demonstration in Zurich described themselves for the first time as the "Frauenbefreiungsbewegung," after the American women's liberation movement, beginning a "new" feminist movement. The activists had come together in the wake of the student revolts and had already drawn media attention in November 1968 with a disruptive action at the 75th-anniversary celebrations of the Zurich women's suffrage association. In various cities of German-speaking, French-speaking (Mouvement de libération des femmes, MLF, from 1970), and Italian-speaking Switzerland (the Movimento femminista ticinese, MFT, from 1972, among others), autonomous groups soon followed, organizing themselves independently of the existing women's associations and of left-wing groups and parties, and rejecting any hierarchical structure. Loosely networked with one another, such groups formed in 16 places across Switzerland by 1977; in Zurich alone, more than 400 women belonged to the FBB's circle. Most were between 21 and 36 years old, unmarried and childless, held a higher educational qualification, and worked mainly in intellectual or artistic professions.

Among the figures of the largely collectively organized movement in German-speaking Switzerland were the sociology students Andrée Valentin and Claudia Honegger, the stage designer and later film director Gertrud Pinkus, the bookseller Lilo König, the artists Doris Stauffer and Vreni Voiret, and the designer Helen Pinkus-Rymann. Gret Haller, head of education for the city of Bern from 1985 to 1988, was the first representative of the new women's movement to be elected to an executive office. In Geneva, Rosangela Gramoni, known for her work at the Dispensaire des femmes and the Association Viol-Secours, and the architect Suzanne Lerch, who worked for migrant women through Espace Femmes International, were among the first-generation activists.

Drawing consciously on the liberation movements of the Third World, the movement called for the liberation of women from the constraints of the nuclear family. Adopting the transnational slogan "the personal is political," it linked a critique of capitalism with a critique of patriarchy, and demanded childcare facilities, free access to contraception, and above all the decriminalization of abortion. Organized in working groups with complete freedom of planning and action, the activists questioned the seemingly self-evident position of women in society and the prevailing sexual morality, which they challenged in public and provocative actions. Members of the Zurich FBB won the creation of Switzerland's first women's center in 1974, soon followed by others.

In 1975, the FBB and MLF coordinated nationally for the first time to hold a "counter-congress" in Bern, attended also by feminists from Italian-speaking Switzerland, in protest against the parallel Swiss Women's Congress organized by the Alliance of Swiss Women's Organizations with some 80 other associations on the theme of "partnership." From then on, 8 March became an occasion for actions and demonstrations across Switzerland. Movement newspapers appeared in 1975 in Zurich and Geneva, Fraue-Zitig and L'Insoumise, and from 1972 information centers "by women, for women" (Infra) were set up in Zurich, St. Gallen, and later Basel, Bern, Frauenfeld, Schaffhausen, and Uster. Operating on a principle of solidarity-based self-help, these offered women support including on questions of abortion. In Geneva, activists created Switzerland's first feminist women's health practice in 1978, and the FBB working group on violence opened the first women's shelter for victims of violence in Zurich in 1979.

Within the FBB and MLF, lesbian women formulated a critique of society's heteronormativity and organized into working groups, advancing their positions from 1975 in Lesbenfront (later Frau ohne Herz) and from 1981 in CLIT 007 (later CLIT International). Despite its distance from institutional politics, the FBB supported the popular initiative for the decriminalization of abortion, submitted in December 1971, and the gender-equality initiative launched in 1975, which could hardly have succeeded without the support of the FBB, the MLF, and progressive women. In the 1980s the movement merged into the diversity of forms that feminism took; it lapsed south of the Alps as early as 1978–1979, and the FBB was formally dissolved in 1988 and the MLF in 1991.

== Bibliography ==
- Bucher, Judith; Schmucki, Barbara (1995). FBB. Fotogeschichte der Frauenbefreiungsbewegung Zürich.
- Budry, Maryelle; Ollagnier, Edmée, eds. (1999). Mais qu'est-ce qu'elles voulaient? Histoires de vie du MLF à Genève.
- Dardel, Julie de (2007). Révolution sexuelle et Mouvement de libération des femmes à Genève (1970–1977).
- Schaufelbuehl, Janick Marina, ed. (2009). 1968–1978. Une décennie mouvementée en Suisse.
- Kiani, Sarah (2019). De la révolution féministe à la constitution. Mouvement des femmes et égalité des sexes en Suisse (1975–1995).
