= Radio in Norway =

There are many radio stations in Norway. For a more comprehensive list see List of Norwegian-language radio stations. In December 2016 Norway transitioned all radio stations away from FM broadcasting to Digital Audio Broadcasting only. The country's national radio outlets transitioned to DAB on December 13, 2017. Local radio stations remain available in FM.

== NRK ==
NRK radio channels are the most prominent stations in Norway. NRK radio is available on DAB and internet radio. The main channels are:

- NRK P1 is the biggest channel in Norway, offering a variety of programs for the vast majority. News headlines every hour.
- NRK P2 is the cultural channel, offering a daily morning news program, as well as classical music.
- NRK P3 is the youth channel, with new popular and often Norwegian music.

NRK also broadcasts specialized radio channels:

- NRK Sápmi: Programs and news in Sami languages
- NRK Klassisk: Classical music. It was the first DAB radio channel in the world. Originally called "NRK Alltid Klassik".
- NRK Nyheter (News) News, replays of news programs from other NRK stations. Re-broadcasts BBC World Service at night.
- NRK mP3: A variant of NRK P3, just without hosts. Broadcasts pop music, often used in gym studios.
- NRK Folkemusikk: Folk music from Norway and rest of the world. Originally called "NRK Alltid Folkemusikk".
- NRK Super is a radio station for children.
- NRK P1+: Grew out of what was NRK Gull.
- NRK Vær is a channel specifically for seafarers, broadcasting weather news in a loop.
- NRK Jazz: Jazz music
- NRK Sport broadcasts live sport.
- NRK P3 Musikk is the music nonstop.

NRK shut off their FM broadcasts in 2017, these stations are not available on FM in the mainland. NRK P1, NRK P2, NRK P3, Radio Norge and P4 NORGE is still available in some parts of Svalbard on FM

All FM broadcasts in Norway gradually switch off in 2031, including the ones in this list. Not every radio station on FM in Norway is listed here.

== Current FM band in Oslo ==
- 99.3 FM – R.Nova
- 101.1 FM - R-Riks
- 104.8 FM – THE BEAT
- 105.8 FM – RLA 105.8 (RLA – Radio Latin Amerika)
- 106.8 FM – Radio Metro (-METRO-)
- 107.7 FM - Norea+

== Current FM band in Østfold ==
- 104.2 FM, 107.7 FM - P5 Hits Fredrikstad
- 106.5 FM - P5 Hits Sarpsborg
- 106.9 FM - P5 Hits Moss
- 98.7 FM, 107.5 FM - P5 Hits Halden
- 100.8 FM, 103.5 FM, 101.8 FM, 106.6 FM, 101.6 FM - Metro Buskerud
- 105.0 FM, 107.0 FM, 105.8 FM, 102.9 FM - Metro Innlandet
- 107.9 FM, 99.5 FM, 88.4 FM, 99.0 FM - Metro Akershus
- 97.3 FM - Radio Øst

== Current FM band in Sørlandet ==
- 104.0 FM, 93.0 FM, 107.4 FM, 104.2 FM, 106.3 FM, 98.6 FM, 103.8 FM, 106.7 FM, 100.6 FM, 102.6 FM, 103.3 FM, 106.1 FM, 105.0 FM - Metro Sørlandet
- 93.2 FM, 106.9 FM - P12 Hitmix Kristiansand

Other stations might not be listed here

== Other major channels ==
- Radio Nord Norge is the Station for the Northern region.
- P4 is a commercial radio station, broadcasting popular music, with some light programs. P4 is most commonly heard in cars.
- Radio Norge broadcasting popular music, similar to P4.

== Regional radio stations ==
These stations are available in several larger Norwegian cities:

- NRJ
- Klem FM
- Power Hit Radio
- Radio 1
- Radio Norway Direct English Radio in Norway

== Local radio stations ==
For a list of local radio stations in Norway, see List of Norwegian radio stations.

== Internet radio ==
Stations with a Norwegian target audience that only broadcast on the Internet:

- Ordentlig Radio
- Vers Libre Community Radio
- Norwegian radio stations on Radio ABC

== See also ==
- List of Norwegian-language radio stations
