= List of Norwegian-language radio stations =

This is a list of Norwegian radio stations or stations that broadcast for a Norwegian language audience.

== Radio stations ==
=== Public radio stations broadcasting in analogue ===
Channel	Description	Financed by	Launched	Analogue coverage	DAB+	Internet	Plus
NRK P1	Principal Radio Channel	Licence	1933	100%	Yes	Yes	Regional services
NRK P2	Culture Channel	Licence	1984	99%	Yes	Yes	-
NRK P3	Youth Channel	Licence	1993	96%	Yes	Yes	-
P4	General Entertainment Channel	Commercials	1993	80%	Yes	Yes	-
Radio Norge	General Entertainment Channel	Commercials	2004	92%	Yes	Yes	-

Note:These major radio stations will shut broadcasts via FM and be digital during 2017.

=== NRK's regional broadcasting ===
Part of the program services of NRK P1

See List of Norwegian Broadcasting Corporations regional broadcasts

=== Current FM band in Oslo ===
The following radio stations are located in and transmitted from Oslo, Norway. There are 17 radio stations in Oslo.

- 90.1 FM - 901 ROX
- 99.3 FM - Radio Nova
- 104.8 FM - The Beat
- 105.8 FM - RLA 105.8 (RLA - Radio Latin Amerika)
- 106.8 FM - Radio Metro (Also FM available in some other Norwegian major cities)

=== Digital radio stations ===
==== NRK ====
- NRK P1+ - A spinoff of P1, targeting a mature audience
- NRK P3 Musikk - 24/7 music
- NRK Folkemusikk - 24/7 Traditional Norwegian folk music
- NRK Jazz - 24/7 Norwegian and European jazz music
- NRK Klassisk - 24/7 classical music
- NRK mP3 - 24/7 dance music (also called mP3)
- NRK Nyheter - 24/7 news
- NRK Sápmi - in Sami languages
- NRK Sport - 24/7 sports channel
- NRK Super - 24/7 for children
- NRK Trafikk - Looping status updates on closed car roads, in regional versions
- NRK Vær - 24/7 weather forecast on DAB only

=== Commercial ===
The following nationwide radio stations are privately owned and broadcast commercial breaks.

==== Run by P4 ====
- P5 Hits
- P6 Rock
- P7 Klem
- P8 Pop
- P9 Retro
- P10 Country
- P11 Dance
- P12 Hitmix

==== Run by Radio Norge ====
- NRJ (Norway)
- P24-7 FUN
- P24-7 MIX
- P24-7 KOS
- P24-7 HOT Country
- Radio Rock
- Radio Topp 40
- Radio Vinyl

==== Others ====
- Ordentlig Radio
- RADIO NORWAY DIRECT - 24/7 English Language Radio in Norway Music News and Comment
- VOXLO RADIO - First 24/7 Multi Ethnic Radio in Norway - Music, Lifestyle and Culture - www.voxloradio.com

=== Regional radio stations ===
These stations are available in several larger Norwegian cities

- Radio Metro
- The Beat

=== Local radio stations ===
- 1 FM Molde
- Askøy lokal
- Bjørnefjord Nærkringkasting
- Bygderadio Vest
- Bykle Radio
- Båtsfjord Radio
- City Radio & TV
- Den Frie Evangel. Fors. Radio
- Drangedal Nærradio
- Ekko Radio
- ETS-Radioen
- Favorite FM
- Filadelfia Radio
- FM1 Romerike
- Gimlekollen Radio
- Gnisten Radio, Bergen
- Godt Nytt Radio
- Guovdageinnu Lagasradio
- Halden Nærradio
- Hallo Kragerø
- Hallo Sogn
- Havøysund Nærradio
- Hjalarhornet Radio
- Hjerteradioen
- Horten Nærradio HNR
- Håpets Røst
- Innlandet Nærradio
- Islandsradioen
- Jæren misjonsradio
- JærRadioen
- Kanal 1 Drammen
- Kanal 1 Elverum
- Kanal 1 Nesodden
- Kanal 7 Bergen
- Kanal 7 Oslo
- Klem FM
- Kontakt Radio
- Kristenradio Tønsberg
- Kystradioen, Askøy
- Kystradioen, Bergen
- Lindesnes Nærradio
- LiquidFM
- Lofotradioen
- Malecón Radio
- Magic Weekend
- Mediekultur Radio
- Meldal Radio
- Misjonsradioen, Sandefjord
- Mistberget Radio
- Mjøsradioen
- Morgenradioen
- Moskenesradioen
- Møtet med Jesus nærradio
- Narvik Studentradio
- NB Radio
- NEA Radio
- Nesna Radio
- NKK Radio
- Norddals-Radioen
- Nordfjord Nærradio
- Norea Radio Oslo
- Norrøna Radio Molde
- Norrøna Radio, Volda/Ørsta
- Norrøna Radio, Ålesund
- Nye Radio Larvik
- Nytt Liv Media
- Nærkanalen
- Ottadalsradioen
- P5 Fosen
- P5 Ringerike
- P5 Solungen
- P7-Kristen Riksradio
- PVest Sogn og Fjordane
- Radio 1 Bergen
- Radio 1 Oslo
- Radio 1 Stavanger
- Radio 1 Trondheim
- Radio 102
- Radio 3 Bodø
- Radio 3 Rana
- Radio 5
- Radio 7
- Radio Acem
- Radio Adressa
- Radio Aftenbladet
- Radio Alta
- Radio Arbeidet
- Radio Arco Iris
- Radio Atlantic
- Radio Bardufoss
- Radio Beiarn
- Radio Bergenhus
- Radio Betel
- Radio Bø
- Radio City
- Radio Doaivu
- Radio Domen
- Radio Drammen
- Radio DSF
- Radio E6
- Radio Evje
- Radio Fana
- Radio Filadelfia, Drammen
- Radio Filadelfia, Kristiansand
- Radio Fitjar
- Radio Folgefonn
- Radio Follo
- Radio Fosen
- Radio Fredrikstad
- Radio Glåmdal
- Radio Gnisten
- Radio Godt Nytt
- Radio Grenland
- Radio Grimstad
- Radio Groruddalen
- Radio Hallingdal
- Radio Hamar
- Radio Hammerfest
- Radio Harstad
- Radio Haugaland
- Radio Helgeland
- Radio Horisont
- Radio Hurum og Røyken A/L
- Radio Hålogaland
- Radio Inter FM
- Radio Internasjonal
- Radio Islam Ahmadiyya
- Radio Karlsøy
- Radio Kongsvinger
- Radio Korgen
- Radio Kristiania
- Radio Kristiansand
- Radio Kvinesdal
- Radio L Lillesand Nærradio
- Radio Laagen
- Radio Latin-Amerika
- Radio Lierne
- Radio Loland A/L
- Radio Luster
- Radio Lyngdal
- Radio Lødingen
- Radio Maran Ata
- Radio Mehamn A/L
- Radio Melbu
- Radio Midt-Telemark
- Radio Midt-Troms A/S
- Radio Midt-Trøndelag
- Radio Midt-Østerdal
- Radio Modum
- Radio Mosjøen
- Radio Moss
- Radio Narvik
- Radio Naustloftet
- Radio New Life
- Radio Nord
- Radio Nord-Salten
- Radio Nordkapp
- Radio Nordsjø
- Radio Nova
- Radio Oslo
- Radio Osterøy
- Radio P5
- Radio Porsanger
- Radio PR
- Radio PS
- Radio På sporet
- Radio R 35
- Radio Randsfjord
- Radio Rauma
- Radio Reboot
- Radio Risør
- Radio Rjukan
- Radio Røst
- Radio Salem
- Radio Salten
- Radio Sandnes
- Radio Sara
- Radio Sarpsborg
- Radio Sentrum, Oslo
- Radio Sentrum, Trondheim
- Radio Sentrum, Ålesund
- Radio Ski
- Radio Skjeberg
- Radio Solør Våler Nærradio
- Radio Sotra
- Radio Stavanger
- Radio Storfjord
- Radio Stryn
- Radio Sunnhordland
- Radio Søgne
- Radio Sør-Helgeland
- Radio Tabernaklet
- Radio Tamil Murasam
- Radio Tamil, Bergen
- Radio Tamil, Ålesund
- Radio Tango
- Radio Telemark
- Radio Toten
- Radio Tri
- Radio Tromsø
- Radio Tønsberg
- Radio Ung
- Radio Vaksdal
- Radio Vega AL
- Radio Vest-Telemark
- Radio Vika
- Radio Visjon
- Radio Volda
- Radio Voz Latina
- Radio Værøy
- Radio Ytringen
- Radio Ålesund
- Radio Øksnes
- Radio Øst
- Radio+ Lillehammer og Gjøvik
- Radio-PX
- Radiodigital 80 tallet
- radiOrakel
- Radios
- Radium
- Romerike Radio
- Sandefjord Radio
- Scandinavian Satellite Radio
- Skjervøy Nærradio
- Stage Radio
- Studentradioen i Bergen
- Sunnmørsposten
- Teipen Radio
- Telerosa Radio
- Tellus Radio
- Tyrifjord Radio Kanal 7
- Valdres Radio
- Varanger Radio
- Vekkelsesradio'n
- VOXLO RADIO
- Østlandets Kanal 1

== Coast radio stations ==
- Tjøme radio (LGT)
- Rogaland radio (LGB)
- Florø radio (LGL)
- Bodø radio (LGP)
- Vardø radio (LGV)
- Svalbard radio (LGS)
