= A-Lee =

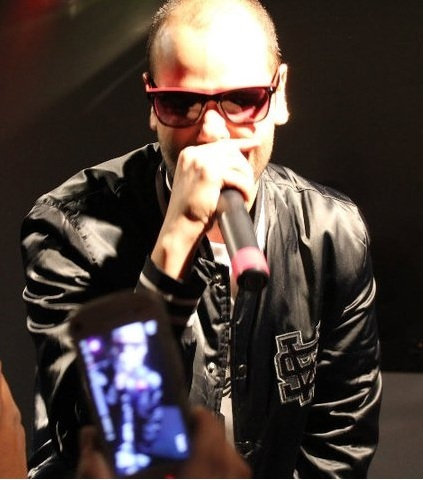

Background information
- Born: Ali Pirzad-Amoli; 17 May 1988 (age 38); Gjøvik, Norway
- Origin: Oslo, Norway
- Genres: Pop, hip hop, electropop, dance-pop
- Occupations: Recording artist, rapper, singer, songwriter, executive producer, CEO
- Instrument: Vocals
- Years active: 2005–present
- Labels: Tee Productions (2007–2008); EE Records (2009–present); Cosmos Music (2009–2012); Columbia/Sony Music (2012–2015); BMG Chrysalis (publishing) (2012–present)
- Website: aleemusic.com

Ali Pirzad-Amoli (Persian: علی پیرزاد آملی; born 17 May 1988), better known by his stage name A-Lee (also sometimes stylized as A-LEE), is a Norwegian pop recording artist, rapper, singer, songwriter and executive producer. A-Lee is the co-founder and CEO of his own record label EE Records and with BMG Chrysalis as a songwriter.

A-Lee is a multi-gold and platinum selling artist who released his debut album Missing in 2010 and his second album Forever Lost in 2012 which contains numerous chart topping songs. His singles "The One" and "World So Cold" reached respectively #7 and #12 at Norwegian Official Charts VG-Lista.
A-Lee was also certified the most-played Norwegian artist on radio in Norway in 2011 and his single "The One" was the most-played song on all Norwegian radio in 2011. In 2012, A-Lee performed his summer smash hit "Feelgood" at huge annual show VG-Lista Rådhusplassen in Oslo where he attended for the third consecutive year after 2010 and 2011.

During his career, A-Lee made many appearances on Norwegian TV (MTV Norway, national channels NRK & TV2, The Voice TV), extensive Norwegian radio (NRJ Radio, The Voice, NRK P3, NRK mP3, P4, P5, JRG Group). A-Lee performed more than 300 concerts, including as support for Tinie Tempah, 50 Cent, Snoop Dogg, Nas, Busta Rhymes, The Game and more...

== Early life ==
A-Lee was born in Gjøvik, Norway, to Iranian-born parents. When he was three years old, his parents divorced. At age of ten, he and his mother moved to Oslo, Norway then when he was thirteen years old, they moved to Los Angeles, California where A-Lee lived for almost 1 year. He then decided to move back to Oslo to live with his father and grew up in the borough Årvoll, Bjerke.

A-Lee grew up listening to Michael Jackson, Eminem, Jay-Z, Nas and Kanye West and citing them as his biggest inspirations.

== Music career ==
=== 2005–2008: Early career ===
A-Lee started in the hip-hop/rap duo Cam'N A-Lee with rapper Cam'leon. In 2005, Cam'N A-Lee won the by:Larm's Audience Award and were nominated for Årets Urørt by NRK P3 with the song "What Do You Mean" featuring Chicosepoy, a member of the Norwegian rap group Karpe Diem. The duo Cam'N A-Lee disbanded in end 2006 after the release of their EP Schmokin' Skills.

In January 2007, A-Lee was signed by Norwegian hip hop producer Tommy Tee on his label Tee Productions. A-Lee appeared on few Tommy Tee's releases but during 2008, A-Lee and Tommy Tee decided to go separate ways on good terms.

=== 2008–2009: From demo to EE Records ===
In Summer 2008, after recording a first demo, A-Lee went to New York City to meet people from music industry working in labels such as Jay-Z's Roc Nation, Eminem's Shady Records and Ryan Leslie's NextSelection Lifestyle Group. From this experience, A-Lee received positive feedbacks which motivated him to continue on his way. Back from New York City, A-Lee started working on new songs which he recorded between Norway and Switzerland.

In fall 2009, A-Lee founded his own record label EE Records with his manager Shahrouz Ghafourian and released his first official single "Bump Off". He also collaborates with famous multi-platinum duo Madcon on the single "Keep Talking". In December 2009, A-Lee signed a distribution deal with Scandinavian biggest independent label Bonnier Amigo Music Group (now known as Cosmos Music Group) to release his debut album Missing.

=== 2010–2011: Success and The One ===
In May 2010, A-Lee released his breakthrough single "World So Cold" which sold Platinum in Norway and reached #12 at Norwegian Official Charts VG-Lista. The single was the most played song on radio NRK mP3 in 2010 and was also the 6th most played song on all Norwegian radio in 2010.

In January 2011 A-Lee released the single "The One" which sold 2× Platinum in Norway and reached #7 at Norwegian Official Charts VG-Lista. A-Lee was also certified the most-played Norwegian artist on radio in Norway in 2011 and his single "The One" was the most-played song on all Norwegian radio in 2011 and ranked #2 at the NRJ Radio Norway best song of 2011. The song "The One" was also nominated for Best Norwegian Hit at NRJ Music Awards 2012.
Again in 2011, A-Lee released the singles "Hear The Crowd" (Gold in Norway, 7th most played song on all Norwegian radio in 2011) and "Before My Eyes" (Gold in Norway).

From all this success, British music manager and former CEO of RCA Label Group (UK) Craig Logan became interested by A-Lee and brought his music to RCA/Sony Music UK which proposed A-Lee a worldwide record contract in August 2011. Unfortunately, due to the restructuring of Sony Music in September and October 2011, the contract could not be finalized.

=== 2012: album Forever Lost ===
In January 2012, A-Lee and his label EE Records signed a licensing deal with Sony Music and started working on his second album Forever Lost. A-Lee also had two nominations at the NRJ Music Awards 2012: Best Norwegian Act and Best Norwegian Hit.

In May 2012, A-Lee released his summer smash hit "Feelgood" which went 4× Platinum in Norway. In June 2012, he was part of the VG-Lista Tour 2012 where he performed his summer smash hit "Feelgood" in particular at the huge annual show VG-Lista Rådhusplassen in Oslo where he attended for the third consecutive year after 2010 and 2011. "Feelgood" reached also #1 for most played music video of The Voice TV Norway in 2012 and #3 for most played song of The Voice radio Norway in 2012.

In September 2012, A-Lee released his single "Over You" (Platinum in Norway) produced by Martin K (signed on StarRoc, the label owned by Jay-Z and Stargate). Famous Dutch model Sylvia Geersen who was the runner-up of Dutch reality television show Holland's Next Top Model is playing the main role in the "Over You" music video. "Over You" reached also #6 for most played music video of The Voice TV Norway in 2012.

In October 2012, A-Lee released his new album Forever Lost, which is full of hits produced by Martin K (Jessie J, Lionel Richie, Sugababes), Bernt Rune Stray (Rihanna, Ne-Yo, Whitney Houston), BPM (Sarah from X-Factor Denmark), Thomas Eriksen (Aaliyah, Franz Ferdinand, The Saturdays), Slipmats (Jennifer Hudson) and Ground Rules.

Following the Forever Lost release, A-Lee signed a worldwide publishing deal with the successful company BMG Chrysalis. A-Lee was also part of the TV show Cover Me broadcast in October 2012 on Norwegian television channel TV2. He performed "People Get Moving" a song he especially wrote for the TV show.

=== 2013–present: Flashy, New Day & Rainbow ===
In January 2013, A-Lee is, for the second consecutive year, nominated 2 times for the NRJ Music Awards 2013 in the categories Best Norwegian Act and Best Norwegian Hit for his successful smash single "Feelgood". A-Lee attended the edition 2013 of Midem which is held been annually in and around the Palais des Festivals et des Congrès in Cannes, France.

In August 2013, A-Lee released his new single "Flashy" featured by Swedish pop artist Eric Saade who also released the song on his album Forgive Me which reached #1 at Swedish Official Charts Sverigetopplistan.

In May 2014, A-Lee released the single "New Day" and its music video.

In May 2015, A-Lee released his new single "Rainbow" and its music video.

== Discography ==
=== Studio albums ===
Title	Album details	Peak chart positions	Certifications
Title	Album details	NOR	Certifications
Missing	Released: 11 October 2010; Label: EE Records; Formats: CD, digital download	—	—
Forever Lost	Released: 5 October 2012; Label: EE Records, Columbia/Sony Music; Formats: CD, digital download, streaming	—	—

=== Singles ===
Title	Year	Peak chart positions	Certifications	Album
Title	Year	NOR	Certifications	Album
"World So Cold" (featuring Marcus Only)	2010	12	IFPI Norway: Platinum	Forever Lost
"The One"	2011	7	IFPI Norway: 2× Platinum	Forever Lost
"Hear The Crowd"	2011	—	IFPI Norway: Gold	Forever Lost
"Before My Eyes"	2011	—	IFPI Norway: Gold	Forever Lost
"Feelgood" (featuring Elisabeth Carew)	2012	—	IFPI Norway: 4× Platinum	Forever Lost
"Over You"	2012	—	IFPI Norway: Platinum	Forever Lost
"People Get Moving"	2012	—	—	Non-album single
"Like You"	2013	—	—	Forever Lost
"Flashy" (featuring Eric Saade)	2013	—	IFPI Norway: Gold	Forgive Me (album of Eric Saade)
"New Day"	2014	—	—	Non-album single
"Rainbow"	2015	—	—	Non-album single

== Music videos ==
Title	Year	Director(s)
"Before My Eyes"	2012	—
"Feelgood" (featuring Elisabeth Carew)	2012	Pål Erik Helgerud
"Over You"	2012	Joon Brandt
"New Day"	2014	Frederic Esnault
"Rainbow"	2015	—

== Awards and nominations ==
Year	Event	Prize	Nominated work	Result	Ref
2005	by:Larm	Audience Award		Won	
2005	NRK P3 Urørt	Årets Urørt	"What Do You Mean" (featuring Chicosepoy)	Nominated	
2012	NRJ Music Awards 2012	Best Norwegian Act		Nominated	
2012	NRJ Music Awards 2012	Best Norwegian Hit	"The One"	Nominated	
2013	NRJ Music Awards 2013	Best Norwegian Act		Nominated	
2013	NRJ Music Awards 2013	Best Norwegian Hit	"Feelgood" (featuring Elisabeth Carew)	Nominated	
