= Nakkim =

Nakkim is a surname. Notable people with the surname include:

- Are Nakkim (born 1964), Norwegian long-distance runner
- Kjellaug Nakkim (1940–2022), Norwegian politician
- Kyrre Nakkim (born 1966), Norwegian journalist
- Markus Nakkim (born 1996), Norwegian footballer
