= Mats Lie Skåre =

Norwegian songwriter

Mats Lie Skåre a.k.a. Slipmats is a Norwegian songwriter and music producer.

== Discography ==
| Song | Artist | Album | Credits | Label | Year |
|---|---|---|---|---|---|
| Longshot | Tone Damli Aaberge | I know | Co-Writer | Universal Music | 2009 |
| Butterflies | Tone Damli Aaberge | I know | Co-Writer | Universal Music | 2009 |
| Sooner Or Later | Tone Damli Aaberge | I know | Co-Writer | Universal Music | 2009 |
| Parachute | Tone Damli Aaberge | I know | Co-Writer | Universal Music | 2009 |
| Then Comes You | Tone Damli Aaberge | I know | Co-Writer | Universal Music | 2009 |
| Left/Right | Sichelle | MGP | Writer/Producer | Universal Music | 2009 |
| Sett Det Der Før | Jaa9 & OnklP | Sellout! | Writer/Producer | Sony Music | 2009 |
| Blog | Jaa9 & OnklP | Sellout! | Writer/Producer | Sony Music | 2009 |
| Glir Forbi | Jaa9 & OnklP | Sellout! | Writer/Producer | Sony Music | 2009 |
| Vi Går Hardt | Jaa9 & OnklP | Sellout! | Writer/Producer | Sony Music | 2009 |
| Ses Igjen ft. Nico D | Jaa9 & OnklP | Sellout! | Writer/Producer | Sony Music | 2009 |
| Her Er Fingern | Jaa9 & OnklP | Sellout! | Writer/Producer | Sony Music | 2009 |
| Konfliktsky ft. Maria Mena | Jaa9 & OnklP | Sellout! | Writer/Producer | Sony Music | 2009 |
| Okey | Jaa9 & OnklP | Sellout! | Writer/Producer | Sony Music | 2009 |
| Sellout! ft. Joddski | Jaa9 & OnklP | Sellout! | Writer/Producer | Sony Music | 2009 |
| Ekkel Uten Truse | Jaa9 & OnklP | Sellout! | Writer/Producer | Sony Music | 2009 |
| Utakata | Speed | S.P.D. | Writer | Avex Entertainment | 2009 |
| Butterflies | Heinz Winckler | Ek Kan Weer In Liefde Glo | Co-Writer | Select Music | 2009 |
| Butterflies | Haylee Fisher | | Co-Writer | Beaver/Warner | 2009 |
| I Never Knew | JuJu | JuJu | Writer/Producer | Sony Music Associated Records | 2010 |
| Un Altro Mondo Marcio | Mondo Marcio | Animale In Gabbia | Writer/Producer | Edel | 2010 |
| Make My Day | Maria Haukaas Storeng | Make My Day | Co-Writer | Emi Music | 2010 |
| You Are the One | Kana Nishino | To Love | Co-Writer | Sony Music Japan | 2010 |
| Free | Jay'ed | Shine | Writer/Producer | Toy's Factory Inc | 2010 |
| Stuck In My Head | Tone Damli | Cocool | Co-Writer | Universal Music | 2010 |
| To Elefanter | Jaa9 & OnklP | Lasse | Writer/Producer | Sony Music | 2011 |
| Ut Av Byen | Jaa9 & OnklP | Lasse | Writer/Producer | Sony Music | 2011 |
| Cap Og Hoodie | Jaa9 & OnklP | Lasse | Writer/Producer | Sony Music | 2011 |
| Du Eller Jeg | Jaa9 & OnklP | Lasse | Writer/Producer | Sony Music | 2011 |
| Be As One | w-inds. | Be As One / Let's get it on | Co-Writer | Pony Canyon | 2011 |
| To My Fans | w-inds. | Be As One / Let's get it on | Co-Writer | Pony Canyon | 2011 |
| Distance | Kana Nishino | Distance | Co-Writer/Producer | Sony Music Japan | 2011 |
| Each Other's Way | Exile | Each Other's Way | Co-Writer | Avex Entertainment | 2011 |
| Allergic | Mimi Blix | MGP | Co-Writer | Cosmos Music Group | 2011 |
| One Girl | Tomohisa Yamashita | Supergood, Superbad | Co-Writer | Johnny's Entertainment | 2011 |
| Back To Start | Sarah West | Like The Sunrise | Co-Writer | Good Songs Publishing | 2011 |
| I Got This | Jennifer Hudson | I Remember Me | Writer/Co-Producer | Sony Music Entertainment | 2011 |
| Summer Rain | Yuka Masaki | Lady Luck | Co-Writer | Universal Music Group | 2011 |
| Nothing Gonna Change It | w-inds. | 10th Anniversary Best - We Dance For Everyone | Co-Writer | Pony Canyon | 2011 |
| Hatefull Av Faen | Jaa9 & OnklP | Geir | Writer/Producer | Sony Music Entertainment | 2011 |
| Så Hip Hop | Jaa9&OnklP | Geir | Writer/Producer | Sony Music Entertainment | 2011 |
| Ikke Se Ned | Jaa9&OnklP | Geir | Writer/Producer | Sony Music Entertainment | 2011 |
| Millionaire | Maria Donna | | Co-Writer | Up Beat | 2011 |
| Are you ready? | Flower | Still | Writer/Producer | Sony Music Japan | 2011 |
| If I Cant Get Over You | Martina | Martina | Writer | Universal Music Group | 2011 |
| Southside | J Soul Brothers | Tribal Soul | Co-Writer/Producer | LDH | 2011 |
| No More Distance | Fairies | Beat Generation | Co-Writer | Avex Trax | 2012 |
| Crazyville | Kate Ryan | Electroshock | Co-writer | ARS/Universal | 2012 |
| Like You | A-Lee | Forever Lost | Writer/Co-Producer | Sony Music Entertainment | 2012 |
| Chaos | The Second | Think `Bout It!! | Co-Writer | LDH | 2012 |
| Echo | Generations | Brave It Out | Co-Writer/Producer | LDH | 2012 |
| Melrose | Exile Atsushi | Melrose | Co-Writer/Producer | LDH | 2012 |
| Dynamite | J Soul Brothers | Miracle | Co-Writer | LDH | 2013 |
| Promise You | Super Junior K.R.Y | Promise You | Co-Writer | Avex Group | 2013 |
| Out Of Yourself | Truls | Out Of Yourself | Composer/Producer | EMI | 2013 |
| Soundtracket Til En Generasjon | Erik & Kriss | Fem | Producer | MTG | 2013 |
| Coming Home | Eric Saade | Forgive Me | Co-Writer | Roxy Recordings/Eccentric Music | 2013 |
| My Eyes On You | Generations | Love You More | Co-Writer | LDH | 2013 |
| Beyond | Miho Fukuhara | Rising Heart/Beyond | Co-Writer | Sony Music Japan | 2013 |
| The Next | Truls | The Next | Composer/Producer | EMI | 2013 |
| Fjern | Jaa9 & OnklP | Diskoteket Er Stengt | Producer | Knirckefritt/Parlophone | 2013 |
| Fenomenon | Jaa9 & OnklP | Diskoteket Er Stengt | Producer | Knirckefritt/Parlophone | 2013 |
| Uten Grunn | Jaa9 & OnklP | Diskoteket Er Stengt | Producer | Knirckefritt/Parlophone | 2013 |
| Sweet Dreams | Kana Nishino | Love Collection - Mint | Co-Writer/Producer | Sony Music Japan | 2013 |
| Interesting | Maria Mena | Weapon In Mind | Composer/Producer | Sony Music Entertainment | 2013 |
| Fuck You | Maria Mena | Weapon In Mind | Composer/Producer | Sony Music Entertainment | 2013 |
| Madness | Maria Mena | Weapon In Mind | Composer/Producer | Sony Music Entertainment | 2013 |
| You Make Me Feel Good | Maria Mena | Weapon In Mind | Composer/Producer | Sony Music Entertainment | 2013 |
| You're All Telling Stories | Maria Mena | Weapon In Mind | Composer/Producer | Sony Music Entertainment | 2013 |
| I'm Only Human | Maria Mena | Weapon In Mind | Composer/Producer | Sony Music Entertainment | 2013 |
| You Hurt The Ones You Love (I don't believe that) | Maria Mena | Weapon In Mind | Composer/Producer | Sony Music Entertainment | 2013 |
| Get Set, Go | Sayaka Shionoya | Snow Flakes Love | Co-Writer | King Records | 2013 |
| You And I... | Ayaka Hirahara | What I Am | Co-Writer | Nayutawave Records | 2013 |
| Sole Survivor | Elisabeth Carew | Sole Survivor | Co-Writer/Producer | Eccentric/Sony Music Norway | 2014 |
| Efter Solsken | Panetoz | Det Blir Vad Du Gör Det Till | Co-Writer/Producer | Warner Music | 2014 |
| Hallå | Panetoz | Det Blir Vad Du Gör Det Till | Co-Writer/Producer | Warner Music | 2014 |
| Dear | The Second | The II Age | Co-Writer/Producer | LDH | 2014 |
| Deep In Lies | Tomomi Itano | Little | Co-Writer | King Records | 2014 |
| Aoi Ryuu | Exile Atsushi | Aoi Ryuu (青い龍) | Co-Writer/Producer | LDH | 2014 |
| Imagine | Kumi Koda | Bon Voyage | Co-Writer/Producer | J-One | 2014 |
| Falling | Charlotte Qvale | Fire Dance With Me | Composer/Producer | Sony Music | 2014 |
| Fire | Julie Bergan | Fire | Composer/Producer | Warner Music | 2014 |
| Never Know | Kana Nishino | Suki | Co-writer/Producer | Sony Music Japan | 2014 |
| Melrose ～愛さない約束～ -Acoustic Ver | Exile Atsushi | Love Ballade | Co-writer/Producer | Rhythm Zone | 2014 |
| Tomorrow Never Dies | Doberman Infinity | Tomorrow Never Dies | Co-writer | Toy's Factory | 2015 |
| Alt På Stell | Jaa9 & OnklP | Alt På Stell | Composer/Producer | Knirckefritt/Universal | 2015 |
| Norge | Panetoz | Norge | Composer/Producer | Warner Music | 2015 |
| Starting Over | J Soul Brothers | Starting Over | Co-Writer | Rhythm Zone | 2015 |
| Circles | Truls | Circles | Composer/Producer | Warner Music | 2015 |
| Don't You Know I Love U | Maco | First Kiss | Composer/Producer | Universal Music Japan | 2015 |
| I don't wanna see you with her | Maria Mena | Growing Pains | Composer/Producer | Sony Music Entertainment | 2015 |
| Not Sober | Maria Mena | Growing Pains | Composer/Producer | Sony Music Entertainment | 2015 |
| Blinded By You | Elias | Warcry | Co-writer | Warner Music Sweden | 2015 |
| La Deg Gå | AdmiralP | La Deg Gå | Composer/Producer | Knirckefritt/Universal | 2015 |
| Runnin Out Of Love | Medina | We Survive | Co-Writer | Labelmade | 2016 |
| Sakura | Crystal Kay | Sakura | Co-Writer | Universal Music Japan | 2016 |
| Celebration | Super Junior-Kyuhyun | Celebration | Co-Writer | Avex Music | 2016 |
| Krangling | AdmiralP | Krangling | Producer | Knirckefritt/Universal | 2016 |
| En Av Dem | Jaa9 & OnklP | Gamle Hunder, Nye Triks | Composer/Producer | Knirckefritt/Universal | 2016 |
| For En Dag | Jaa9 & OnklP | Gamle Hunder, Nye Triks | Composer/Producer | Knirckefritt/Universal | 2016 |
| Fokush | Jaa9 & OnklP | Gamle Hunder, Nye Triks | Composer/Producer | Knirckefritt/Universal | 2016 |
| 2 Sko | Jaa9 & OnklP | Gamle Hunder, Nye Triks | Composer/Producer | Knirckefritt/Universal | 2016 |
| På Nytt | Jaa9 & OnklP | Gamle Hunder, Nye Triks | Composer/Producer | Knirckefritt/Universal | 2016 |
| Vennina | Jaa9 & OnklP | Gamle Hunder, Nye Triks | Composer/Producer | Knirckefritt/Universal | 2016 |
| Sound Of Love | Generations From Exile Tribe | Pierrot | Co-Writer/Producer | Rhythm Zone/ LDH | 2016 |
| Bon Voyage | E-Girls | Go! Go! Let's Go! | Co-Writer/Producer | Rhythm Zone/ LDH | 2016 |
| All Day Long Lady | E-Girls | All Day Long Lady | Co-Writer/Producer | Rhythm Zone/ LDH | 2016 |
| Don't Let Go | Lila ft. Rat City | Don´t Let Go | Co-Writer | Drabant Music | 2017 |
| Change My Life | Dream-Ami | Hayaku Aitai | Co-Writer/Producer | Avex Trax | 2017 |
| Whine Slow | Panetoz | Whine Slow | Composer/Producer | PNTZ | 2017 |
| Waiting For The Moment | Infinite | Air | Co-Writer/Producer | Universal Music Japan | 2017 |
| Risky | JUJU | Iiwake | Co-Writer/Producer | Sony Music Japan | 2017 |
| One More Time | Kana Nishino | Te wo Tsunagu Riyuu | Co-Writer/Producer | Sony Music Japan | 2017 |
| Öppna Din Dörr (Säg Att Du Vill Ha Mig Här | Panetoz | Singel | Co-Writer/Producer | PNTZ | 2017 |
| Mata, Ashita | Generations From Exile Tribe | Fly Boys Fly Girls | Co-Writer/Producer | Avex Trax | 2018 |
| Dear My Friend | Maco | Best Love | Co-Writer/Producer | Universal Music Japan | 2018 |
| 願い | Kat-Tun | Cast | Co-Writer | Universal Music Japan | 2018 |
| Lavender | Jaejoong | Defiance | Co-Writer/Producer | Sony Music Japan | 2018 |
| Look At Me Now | Sudannayuzuyully | Look At Me Now | Co-Writer | Rhythm Zone | 2019 |
| Yes We Are | J Soul Brothers | Yes We Are | Co-Writer/Producer | Rhythm Zone | 2019 |
| Impossible | Jaejoong | Flawless Love | Co-Writer/Producer | Sony Music Japan | 2019 |
| No More! | Happiness | Power Girls | Co-Writer/Producer | Rhythm Zone | 2019 |
| Church By The Sea | Ryuji Imaichi | Rily | Co-Writer/Producer | Rhythm Zone | 2019 |
| Ai no Tame ni ~for love, for a child~ | Exile | Ai no Tame ni ~for love, for a child~ | Co-Writer/Producer | Rhythm Zone | 2020 |
| starting over ~one world~ | J Soul Brothers | starting over ~one world~ | Co-Writer | Rhythm Zone | 2020 |
| Soldiers | Da Pump | Fantasista | Co-Writer/Producer | Avex | 2020 |
| Dream On The Street | Da Pump | Dream On The Street EP | Co-Writer/Producer | Avex | 2021 |
| Blow Off Steam | Ballistik Boyz from EXILE TRIBE | Sum Baby | Co-Writer | Avex | 2021 |
| Moon And Back | The Rampage from EXILE TRIBE | Living In The Dream | Co-Writer | Avex | 2021 |
| Jump Start | Alan Walker | Walker Racing League | Co-Writer/Co-Producer | MER | 2021 |
| Running Out Of Roses | Alan Walker | Walker Racing League | Co-Writer/Co-Producer | MER | 2021 |
| World We Used To Know | Alan Walker | World Of Walker | Co-Writer/Co-Producer | MER | 2021 |
| Out Of Love | Alan Walker | World Of Walker | Co-Writer/Co-Producer | MER | 2021 |
| OK | Alan Walker | World Of Walker | Co-Writer/Co-Producer | MER | 2021 |
| Headlights (feat. KIDDO) | Alok, Alan Walker | Headlights | Co-Writer | CONTROVERSIA | 2022 |
| Adventure Time | Alan Walker | Walkerverse Pt.1 | Co-Writer/Co-Producer | MER | 2022 |
| Somebody Like U | Alan Walker | Walkerverse Pt.1 | Co-Writer/Co-Producer | MER | 2022 |
| Blue | Alan Walker | Walkerverse Pt.1 | Co-Writer/Co-Producer | MER | 2022 |
| The Drum | Alan Walker | Walkerverse Pt.1 | Co-Writer/Co-Producer | MER | 2022 |
| Hello World | Alan Walker | Walkerverse Pt.1 | Co-Writer/Co-Producer | MER | 2022 |
| Shut Up | Alan Walker, UPSAHL | Walkerverse Pt.2 | Co-Writer/Co-Producer | MER | 2022 |
| Ritual | Alan Walker | Walkerverse Pt.2 | Co-Writer/Co-Producer | MER | 2022 |
| Lovesick | Alan Walker, Sophie Simmons | Walkerverse Pt.2 | Co-Writer/Co-Producer | MER | 2022 |
| Extremes | Alan Walker, Trevor Daniel | Walkerverse Pt.2 | Co-Writer/Co-Producer | MER | 2022 |
| Dreamer | Alan Walker | Dreamer | Co-Writer/Co-Producer | MER | 2023 |
| Heart Over Mind | Alan Walker, Daya | Walkerworld | Co-Writer/Co-Producer | MER | 2023 |
| Hero | Alan Walker, Sasha Alex Sloan | Walkerworld | Co-Writer/Co-Producer | MER | 2023 |
| Spectre 2.0 | Alan Walker, Steve Aoki | Walkerworld | Co-Writer/Co-Producer | MER | 2023 |
| Better Off (Alone, Pt. III) | Alan Walker | Walkerworld | Co-Writer/Co-Producer | MER | 2023 |
| Endless Summer | Alan Walker, Zak Abel | Walkerworld | Co-Writer/Co-Producer | MER | 2023 |
| Born To Ride | Alan Walker, Sophie Stray | Walkerworld | Co-Writer/Co-Producer | MER | 2023 |
| Yesterday | Alan Walker, Ali Gatie | Walkerworld | Co-Writer/Co-Producer | MER | 2023 |
| Land Of The Heroes | Alan Walker, Sophie Stray | Walkerworld | Co-Writer/Co-Producer | MER | 2023 |
| Fire! | Alan Walker, YUQI, JVKE | Walkerworld | Co-Writer/Co-Producer | MER | 2023 |
| Who I Am | Alan Walker, Putri Ariani, Peder Elias | Who I Am | Co-Writer/Co-Producer | Kreatell Music | 2024 |
| Wake Up | Alan Walker | Neon Nights | Co-Writer/Co-Producer | Kreatell Music | 2024 |
| Beautiful Nightmare | Alan Walker, bludnymyph | Neon Nights | Co-Writer/Co-Producer | Kreatell Music | 2024 |
| Lifeline | Alan Walker, Lova | Neon Nights | Co-Writer/Co-Producer | Kreatell Music | 2024 |
| Club Leclerc | Alan Walker | Neon Nights | Co-Writer/Co-Producer | Kreatell Music | 2024 |
| Unsure | Alan Walker, Kylie Cantrall | Unsure | Co-Writer | Kreatell Music | 2024 |
| Barcelona | Alan Walker, Ina Wroldsen | Barcelona | Co-Writer/Co-Producer | Kreatell Music | 2024 |
| Thick Of It All | Alan Walker, Joe Jonas, Julia Michaels | Thick Of It All | Co-Writer/Co-Producer | Kreatell Music | 2024 |
| Children Of The Sun | Alan Walker, Pritam, Vishal Mishra | Children Of The Sun | Co-Writer/Co-Producer | Kreatell Music | 2024 |
| When I Grow Up | Alan Walker, Flo Rida | When I Grow Up | Co-Writer/Co-Producer | APG | 2024 |
| Avalon | Alan Walker, Anne Gudrun | Avalon | Co-Writer/Co-Producer | Kreatell Music | 2024 |
| Dancing In Love | Alan Walker, MEEK | Dancing In Love | Co-Writer/Co-Producer | Kreatell Music | 2024 |
| Forever Young | Alan Walker | Walkerworld 2.0 | Co-Writer/Co-Producer | Kreatell Music | 2025 |
| Last Song | Alan Walker, Faouzia | Walkerworld 2.0 | Co-Writer/Co-Producer | Kreatell Music | 2025 |
| Incommunicado | Alan Walker | Walkerworld 2.0 | Co-Writer/Co-Producer | Kreatell Music | 2025 |
| Warpaint | Alan Walker | Walkerworld 2.0 | Co-Writer/Co-Producer | Kreatell Music | 2025 |
| Dust | Alan Walker, Robin Packalen | Dust | Co-Writer/Co-Producer | Kreatell Music | 2025 |
| Guaro Con Ron | Alan Walker, Sofia Reyes | Guaro Con Ron | Co-Producer | Kreatell Music | 2025 |
| Mind Of A Warrior | Alan Walker, Sorana | Mind Of A Warrior | Co-Producer/Co-Writer | Kreatell Music | 2025 |
| Moonshine | Alan Walker | Moonshine | Co-Producer/Co-Writer | Kreatell Music | 2025 |
| Me, Myself & The Night | Alan Walker | Me, Myself & The Night | Co-Producer/Co-Writer | Kreatell Music | 2025 |
| Old Habits | Alan Walker, Farruko, Sofia Reyes | Old Habits (from Delta Force Game) | Co-Producer/Co-Writer | Kreatell Music | 2025 |
| Broken Angel | Alan Walker, Steve Aoki | Lonely Club | Co-Producer/Co-Writer | Kreatell Music | 2025 |
| Getaway | Alan Walker | World Of Walker, Season One: Rise Of The Drones | Co-Producer/Co-Writer | Kreatell Music | 2026 |
| Broken Strings | Alan Walker | World Of Walker, Season One: Rise Of The Drones | Co-Producer/Co-Writer | Kreatell Music | 2026 |
| Eroina | Alan Walker | World Of Walker, Season One: Rise Of The Drones | Co-Producer/Co-Writer | Kreatell Music | 2026 |
| Monster | Alan Walker | World Of Walker, Season One: Rise Of The Drones | Co-Producer/Co-Writer | Kreatell Music | 2026 |
| Void | Alan Walker | World Of Walker, Season One: Rise Of The Drones | Co-Producer/Co-Writer | Kreatell Music | 2026 |
| Dream On | Alan Walker | World Of Walker, Season One: Rise Of The Drones | Co-Producer/Co-Writer | Kreatell Music | 2026 |
| Primacy: EXPLOR-8 | Alan Walker | World Of Walker, Season One: Rise Of The Drones | Co-Producer/Co-Writer | Kreatell Music | 2026 |
| A World I Don't Know | Alan Walker | World Of Walker, Season One: Rise Of The Drones | Co-Producer/Co-Writer | Kreatell Music | 2026 |
| Brave Enough To Be Unknown | Alan Walker | World Of Walker, Season One: Rise Of The Drones | Co-Producer/Co-Writer | Kreatell Music | 2026 |
| Adagio | Alan Walker | World Of Walker, Season One: Rise Of The Drones | Co-Producer/Co-Writer | Kreatell Music | 2026 |
| FATE | Alan Walker, Ava Max | FATE | Co-Producer/Co-Writer | Kreatell Music | 2026 |
