= The One (A-Lee song) =

Single by A-Lee

from the album Forever Lost
- Released: January 11, 2011
- Recorded: December 2010; Krypton Sound Planet (Oslo, Norway)
- Genre: Pop, hip hop, electropop, dance-pop
- Length: 3:49
- Label: EE Records, Columbia/Sony Music Norway
- Songwriter(s): Ali Pirzad-Amoli, Bjarte Giske, Morten Pape, Christian Thomassen
- Producer(s): Ground Rules

A-Lee singles chronology
"World So Cold" (2010)	"The One" (2011)	"Hear The Crowd" (2011)

"The One" is a song by recording artist A-Lee from his second studio album, Forever Lost (2012). It was released on January 11, 2011, in Norway, on EE Records and Columbia/Sony Music Norway. A-Lee worked with producers Ground Rules.

"The One" is A-Lee's second single and it sold 2× Platinum in Norway and reached #7 at Norwegian Single Charts VG-Lista. It was also certified the most-played song on all Norwegian radio in 2011.
It was also the most played song on radio NRK mP3 in 2011 making A-Lee being #1 on this radio for the second consecutive year after 2010 and ranked #2 at the NRJ radio Norway best song of 2011. The song "The One" was also nominated for Best Norwegian Hit at NRJ Music Awards 2012.

In 2011, A-Lee performed "The One" at huge annual show VG-Lista Rådhusplassen in Oslo where he attended for the second consecutive year after 2010.

== Track listing ==
No.	Title	Writer(s)	Producer(s)	Length
1.	"The One"	Ali Pirzad-Amoli, Bjarte Giske, Morten Pape, Christian Thomassen	Ground Rules	3:49

== Personnel ==
- Björn Engelmann – mastering
- Shahrouz Ghafourian – executive producer, management
- Bjarte Giske – producer, engineer, mixer
- Morten Pape – producer, engineer, mixer, vocals
- Raphaël Piguet – photography
- Ali Pirzad-Amoli – vocals, executive producer, artwork design

== Chart positions and certifications ==
Chart (2011)	Peak position
Norway (VG-Lista)	7

Country	Certification
IFPI Norway	2× Platinum

== Release history ==
Country	Date	Format	Label
Norway	11 January 2011	digital download	EE Records, Columbia/Sony Music Norway
