= Forever Lost =

Forever Lost may refer to:

- "Forever Lost" (song), the debut single by rock band The Magic Numbers
- Forever Lost (album), a 2012 album by Norwegian recording artist A-Lee
- "Forever Lost", a song by God Is an Astronaut on the album All Is Violent, All Is Bright
- "Forever Lost", a song by Sentenced on the album Amok
