= Skogrand =

Skogrand is a surname. Notable people with the surname include:

- Kjetil Skogrand (born 1967), Norwegian historian and politician
- Samantha Skogrand (born 1989), Norwegian television presenter
- Stine Skogrand (born 1993), Norwegian handball player

== See also ==
- Ingeborgrud
