= Television House (Oslo) =

Building at the NRK Headquarters

Coordinates: 59.9358°N 10.7201°E

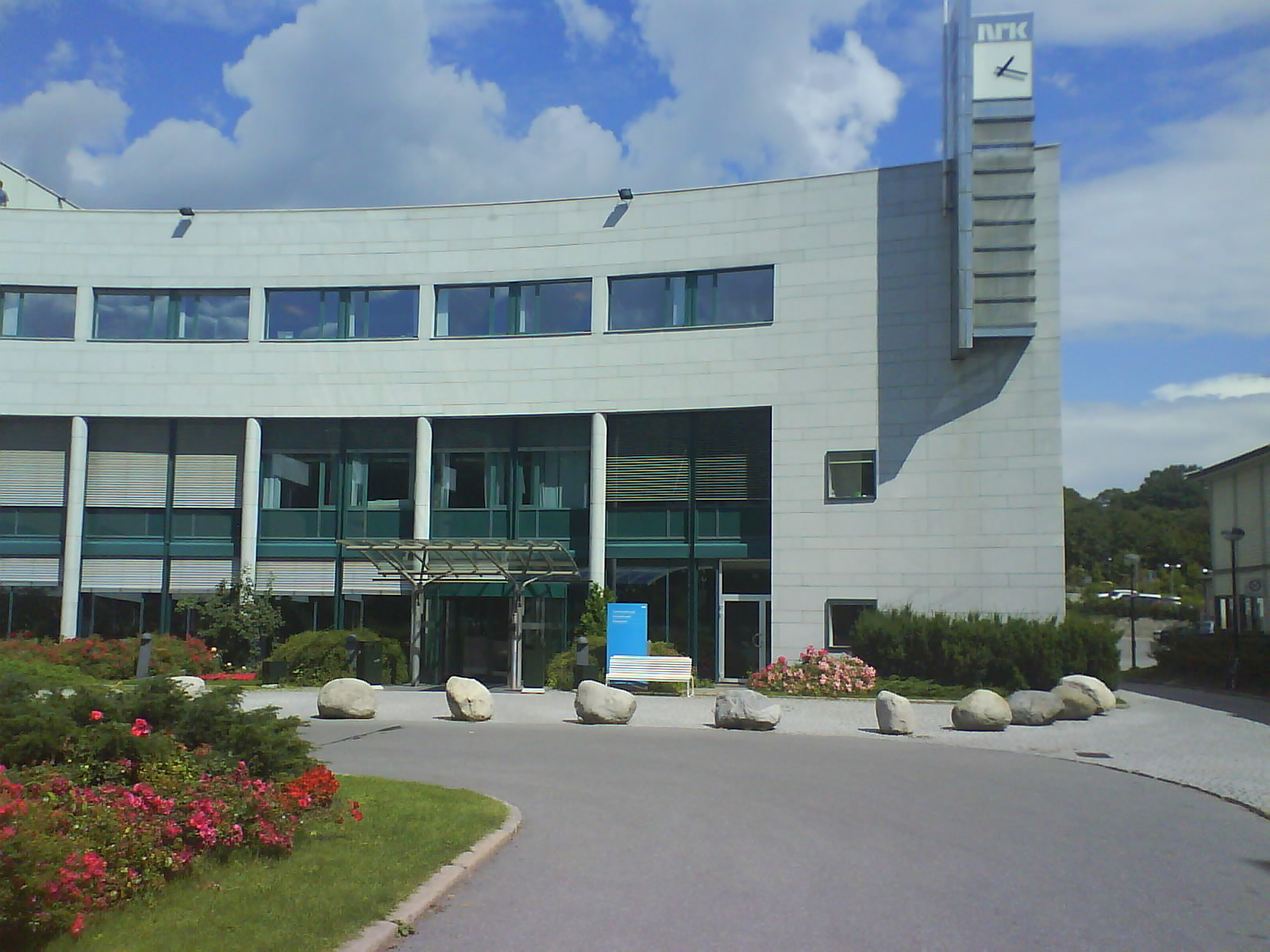
Television House

The Television House (Norwegian: Fjernsynshuset) is one of the main buildings at NRK headquarters at Marienlyst in Oslo. The other main building is the Broadcasting House.

The building was designed by Nils Holter and Jan Bauck and opened in 1969.

News productions at the Television House include content for Dagsrevyen (TV), Dagsnytt (radio), NRK Nyheter (radio), and online news services.
