= Kyrre Nakkim =

Norwegian journalist

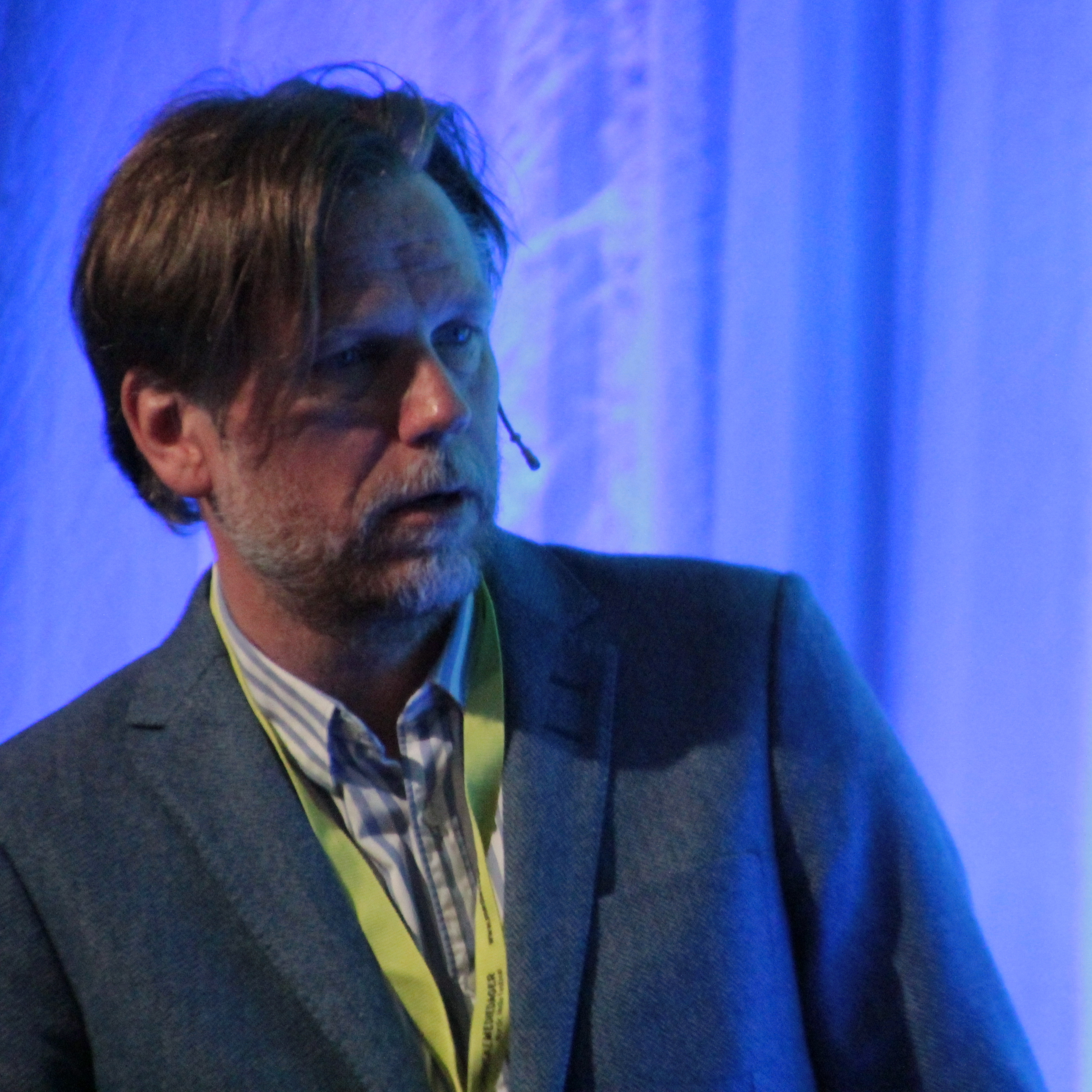
Nakkim in 2017

Kyrre Nakkim (born 18 March 1966) is a Norwegian journalist.

He is currently political editor of the evening news Dagsrevyen, aired on the Norwegian Broadcasting Corporation. As such he appears on-screen as a news analyst on domestic political affairs. He has formerly worked with commentary in Dagsavisen.

Kyrre Nakkim is the son of Kjellaug Nakkim, a Conservative politician from Moss and former chair of the Broadcasting Council in Norway.
