= World So Cold =

World So Cold may refer to:

- "World So Cold" (Mudvayne song)
- "World So Cold" (Three Days Grace song)
- "World So Cold" (A-Lee song)
