= Hear the Crowd =

"Hear The Crowd"

Single by A-Lee

from the album Forever Lost
- Released: May 30, 2011
- Recorded: May 2011; Krypton Sound Planet (Oslo, Norway)
- Genre: Pop, hip hop, electropop, dance-pop
- Length: 3:52
- Label: EE Records, Columbia/Sony Music Norway
- Songwriter(s): Ali Pirzad-Amoli, Bjarte Giske, Morten Pape, Christian Thomassen, Philip Vrålstad
- Producer(s): Ground Rules

A-Lee singles chronology
"The One" (2011)	"Hear The Crowd" (2011)	"Before My Eyes" (2011)

"Hear The Crowd" is a song by recording artist A-Lee from his second studio album, Forever Lost (2012). It was released on May 30, 2011 in Norway, on EE Records and Columbia/Sony Music Norway. A-Lee worked with producers Ground Rules.

"Hear The Crowd" is A-Lee's third single and it sold Gold in Norway and 7th most played song on all Norwegian radio in 2011.

== Track listing ==
No.	Title	Writer(s)	Producer(s)	Length
1.	"Hear The Crowd"	Ali Pirzad-Amoli, Bjarte Giske, Morten Pape, Christian Thomassen, Philip Vrålstad	Ground Rules	3:52

== Personnel ==
- Björn Engelmann – mastering
- Shahrouz Ghafourian – executive producer, management
- Bjarte Giske – producer, engineer, mixer
- Marori Morningstar – photography
- Morten Pape – producer, engineer, mixer
- Ali Pirzad-Amoli – vocals, executive producer, artwork design

== Chart positions and certifications ==
Chart (2011)	Peak position
Norway (VG-Lista)	—

Country	Certification
IFPI Norway	Gold

== Release history ==
Country	Date	Format	Label
Norway	30 May 2011	digital download	EE Records, Columbia/Sony Music Norway
