= Broadcasting Council (Norway) =

Advisory board to the Norwegian Broadcasting Corporation

The Broadcasting Council (Norwegian: Kringkastingsrådet, or K-rådet for short) is an advisory board to the Norwegian Broadcasting Corporation (NRK).

The role of the Broadcasting Council is to discuss and comment on NRK's programming agenda for Norwegian radio and television, and to advise on administrative and financial matters. Cases and appeals can be referred to the Council either by the NRK director-general or by NRK viewers and listeners. The Broadcasting Council is also free to consider matters of their own choosing.

The Broadcasting Council meets eight to ten times annually and has 14 members. The Parliament of Norway appoints eight of the members, while the Council of State appoints the other six. One of the eight members appointed by the parliament will be especially responsible for Sami-language programming; this role is held by Steinar Pedersen.

From 2006 to 2009, Kjellaug Nakkim, who had been deputy chair, served as chair of the Council. The chair for 2010 to 2013 was May-Helen Molvær Grimstad.
