= Ordentlig Radio =

Coordinates: 59°57′49″N 10°28′2″E

Norway
- Broadcast area: Norway

Programming
- Language: Norwegian
- Format: Norwegian music

History
- First air date: 2012

Links
- Webcast: yes
- Website: oradio.no

Ordentlig Radio (English: Genuine Radio) is a Norwegian Internet radio station that was officially launched in 2012.

Headquartered at Flytårnet på Fornebu outside Oslo, the initiative for the station came from recording artist Øystein Sunde and radio veteran Tor Andersen of Radio P4. The Internet-only radio format followed two rejections of application for land-based broadcasting licence in 2007 and 2008. The FM application was for the Oslo and Greater Oslo Region. When the company subsequently folded in 2009, Sunde with his family company owned 21.8% of the shares. Andersen and his partner with their company owned an equally large share. Artist Jonas Fjeld also held a 2.73% share of the company.

The content of the 24-hour station is exclusively Norwegian music, and the music archive initially contained 12,000 songs. A particular focus of the station is to present artists that its bigger cousins such as NRK Radio will not give airtime to. The station mostly plays popular music during the day and airs special programming at night.

Famous Norwegian recording artists Hanne Krogh and Halvdan Sivertsen are also said to be involved in the project.

== See also ==
- Radio in Norway
