= Broadcasting House (Oslo) =

Coordinates: 59.9351°N 10.7182°E

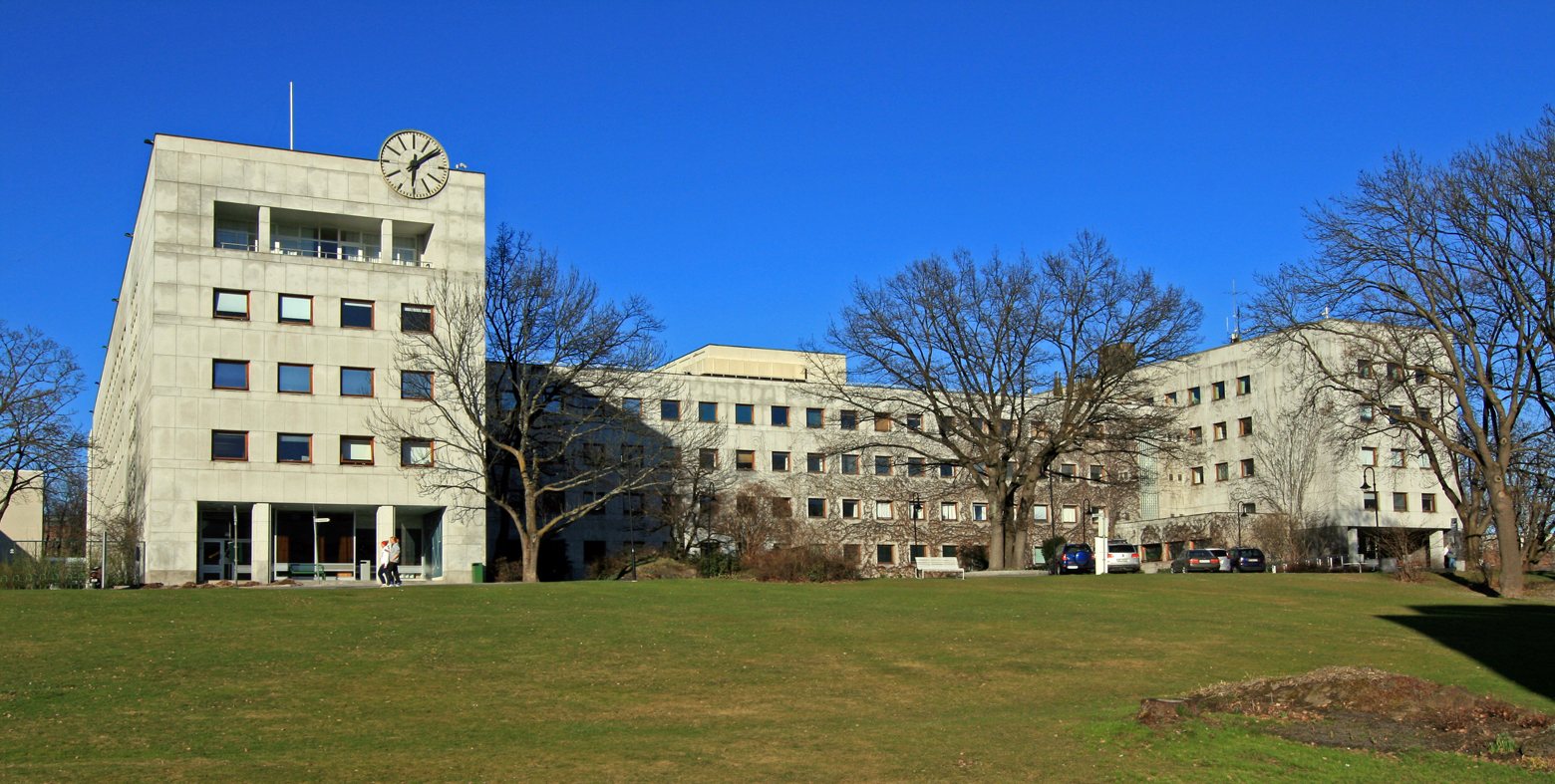
Kringkastingshuset

The Broadcasting House (Norwegian: Kringkastingshuset) is the oldest building of the Norwegian Broadcasting Corporation headquarters. Also known as the "Radio House" (Radiohuset) or the "White House" (Det hvite hus), it is situated in the Marienlyst area of the borough of St. Hanshaugen in Oslo, Norway. The other main building is known as the Television House.

It was built between 1938 and 1950 after plans by architects Nils Holter (1899–1995) and Ole Øvergaard (1893–1972).
