= NRK Vær =

Norwegian radio service

NRK Vær is a specialist radio service catering ocean-going vessels and commercial and recreational fishing boats, operated by NRK. It is receivable nationwide using the DAB network along the coastline and 50km from the external coastline, with exceptions such as the border with Sweden to the east, at Indre Oslofjord, along the Sørlandet coast, Vestlandet and most of the Trøndelag coast. In addition, it counts with transmitters at Mo i Rana, Bodø, Narvik, Harstad, Tromsø, Hammerfest, Alta and Vadsø. In Svalbard, it broadcasts through a medium wave transmitter covering the whole archipelago. NRK operates the service in association with the Norwegian Meteorological Institute.

== Content and reception ==
The service provides offshore weather announcements. These bulletins are read at around 9am, around 1pm and around 9pm, though new updates sometimes emerge between these bulletins depending on conditions. The service repeats the bulletin until a new one is made, similar to NRK Trafikk. NRK Vær is divided up into three versions: NRK Vær syd, NRK Vær vest and NRK Vær nord. It previously delivered its services through transmitters at Kløfta, Kvitsøy, Fredrikstad, Vigra and Ingøy. The longwave station at Ingøy was the last to shut down (in 2018).

It was the only NRK radio station not to change its programming on 28 August 2026, when King Harald V died.
