= Before My Eyes =

Single by A-Lee

from the album Forever Lost
- Released: November 11, 2011
- Recorded: October 2011; Krypton Sound Planet (Oslo, Norway)
- Genre: Pop, hip hop, electropop, dance-pop
- Length: 2:59
- Label: EE Records, Columbia/Sony Music Norway
- Songwriter(s): Ali Pirzad-Amoli, Bjarte Giske, Morten Pape, Christian Thomassen, Olav Verpe
- Producer(s): Ground Rules

A-Lee singles chronology
"Hear The Crowd" (2011)	"Before My Eyes" (2011)	"Feelgood" (2012)

"Before My Eyes" is a song by recording artist A-Lee from his second studio album, Forever Lost (2012). It was released on November 11, 2011, in Norway, on EE Records and Columbia/Sony Music Norway. A-Lee worked with producers Ground Rules.

"Before My Eyes" is A-Lee's fourth single and it sold Gold in Norway. It received great radio attention in Norway.

The music video of single "Before My Eyes" was released on January 14, 2012. It was filmed in Oslo, Norway. Special effects were used in the music video.

== Track listing ==
No.	Title	Writer(s)	Producer(s)	Length
1.	"Hear The Crowd"	Ali Pirzad-Amoli, Bjarte Giske, Morten Pape, Christian Thomassen, Olav Verpe	Ground Rules	2:59

== Personnel ==
- Björn Engelmann – mastering
- Shahrouz Ghafourian – executive producer, management
- Bjarte Giske – producer, engineer, mixer, additional vocals
- Marori Morningstar – photography
- Morten Pape – producer, engineer, mixer
- Ali Pirzad-Amoli – vocals, executive producer, artwork design
- Olav Verpe – additional vocals

== Chart positions and certifications ==
Chart (2011)	Peak position
Norway (VG-Lista)	—

Country	Certification
IFPI Norway	Gold

== Release history ==
Country	Date	Format	Label
Norway	11 November 2011	digital download	EE Records, Columbia/Sony Music Norway

== Music videos ==
Title	Year	Director(s)
"Before My Eyes"	2012	—
