= Samantha Skogrand =

Norwegian television presenter

- Born: 19 August 1989 (age 37)
- Education: University of Bergen (BA)
- Occupation: Television presenter

Samantha Kristina Skogrand (born 19 August 1989) is a Norwegian television presenter. She is known for her work as a reporter and presenter at TV2 sports section and TV2 Sportkanalen. In June 2012 she started to work as a reporter for the entertainment section of TV2 in the show God kveld Norge!. She also presented God Morgen Norge. She ended her work at TV2 in late 2014. In 2017, she worked on Radio Norge presenting the morning show Morgenklubben.

She went into acting in 2017 when she did the Norwegian dub for a character in the film Cars 3.

She was in a relationship with Emil Hegle Svendsen until April 2023. The couple are parents to a boy and a girl.
