= Forever Lost (album) =

Studio album by A-Lee
- Released: October 5, 2012 (in Norway)
- Recorded: January 2012 – May 2012; Sub Tunes Studio (Oslo, Norway); Krypton Sound Planet (Oslo, Norway); Martin K Studio (Trondheim, Norway); Whiteroom Studio (Asker, Norway); BPM Productions (Kristiansand, Norway); Eccentric Studio (Oslo, Norway)
- Genre: Pop, hip hop, electropop, dance-pop
- Length: 40:49
- Label: EE Records, Columbia/Sony Music Norway
- Producer: Ali "A-Lee" Pirzad-Amoli (exec.), Shahrouz Ghafourian (exec.), Ground Rules, Martin K, Bernt Rune Stray, BPM, Thomas Eriksen, Slipmats, The Products

A-Lee chronology
Missing (2010)	Forever Lost (2012)

Singles from Forever Lost
- 1. "World So Cold" Released: May 5, 2010 (in Norway); 2. "The One" Released: January 11, 2011 (in Norway); 3. "Hear The Crowd" Released: May 30, 2011 (in Norway); 4. "Before My Eyes" Released: November 11, 2011 (in Norway); 5. "Feelgood" Released: May 11, 2012 (in Norway); 6. "Over You" Released: August 31, 2012 (in Norway); 7. "Like You" Released: March 12, 2013 (in Norway)

Forever Lost is the second studio album by Norwegian recording artist A-Lee, released on October 5, 2012 in Norway, on EE Records and Columbia/Sony Music Norway. A-Lee worked with producers Ground Rules, Martin K, Bernt Rune Stray, BPM, Thomas Eriksen, Slipmats and The Products. The original album track list features Aleksander With, Elisabeth Carew and Marcus Only.

The album contains the chart hits, "The One" and "World So Cold", which reached No. 7 and No. 12 on Norwegian Official Charts VG-Lista, respectively.

== Track listing ==
No.	Title	Writer(s)	Producer(s)	Length
1.	"Forever Lost"	Ali Pirzad-Amoli, Bjarte Giske, Morten Pape, Olav Verpe	Ground Rules	4:29
2.	"The One"	Ali Pirzad-Amoli, Bjarte Giske, Morten Pape, Christian Thomassen	Ground Rules	3:49
3.	"Before My Eyes"	Ali Pirzad-Amoli, Bjarte Giske, Morten Pape, Christian Thomassen, Olav Verpe	Ground Rules	2:59
4.	"Over You"	Ali Pirzad-Amoli, Martin Kleveland, Tommy Kristiansen	Martin K	3:33
5.	"Like You"	Mats Lie Skåre, Thomas Eriksen	Thomas Eriksen, Slipmats (co.)	3:19
6.	"World So Cold" (featuring Marcus Only)	Ali Pirzad-Amoli, Bjarte Giske, Morten Pape, Christian Thomassen	Ground Rules	4:04
7.	"Girlfriend" (featuring Aleksander With)	Ali Pirzad-Amoli, Berent Philip Moe, Bernt Rune Stray, Aleksander With	BPM & Stray	3:14
8.	"Feelgood" (featuring Elisabeth Carew)	Ali Pirzad-Amoli, Bjarte Giske, Elisabeth Carew, Morten Pape, Philip Vrålstad	Ground Rules	3:19
9.	"Hear The Crowd"	Ali Pirzad-Amoli, Bjarte Giske, Morten Pape, Christian Thomassen, Philip Vrålstad	Ground Rules	3:52
10.	"Function (Hey!)"	Ali Pirzad-Amoli, Abubaker Noor, Nima Khazai, Bjarte Giske, Morten Pape	The Products, Ground Rules (co.)	3:17
11.	"It Follows" (featuring Elisabeth Carew)	Ali Pirzad-Amoli, Elisabeth Carew, Bjarte Giske, Morten Pape	Ground Rules	4:54
Total length:				40:49

== Personnel ==
Credits for Forever Lost album

=== Production ===
- Tim Blacksmith – management
- Jørgen Bratlie – A&R
- Danny D. – management
- Björn Engelmann – mastering
- Thomas Eriksen – producer, engineer, mixer
- Shahrouz Ghafourian – executive producer, management
- Bjarte Giske – producer, engineer, mixer
- Nima Khazai – producer
- Martin Kleveland – producer, instrumentation, engineer
- Rasmus Kongsøre – photography
- Pål Leverton – artwork design
- Berent Philip Moe – producer, instrumentation, mixer
- Marori Morningstar – photography
- Abubaker Noor – producer
- Morten Pape – producer, engineer, mixer
- Bjørn Erik Pedersen – mixer
- Ali Pirzad-Amoli – executive producer, artwork design
- Mats Lie Skåre – producer, engineer
- Bernt Rune Stray – producer, instrumentation, engineer

=== Musicians ===
- Elisabeth Carew – vocals
- Bjarte Giske – additional vocals
- Tommy Kristiansen – guitar
- Martin Mulholland – additional vocals
- Marcus Ulstad Nilsen – vocals
- Thea Oskarsen – additional vocals
- Morten Pape – vocals
- Ali Pirzad-Amoli – vocals
- Mats Lie Skåre – vocals
- Olav Verpe – vocals, additional vocals
- Aleksander With – vocals

== Release history ==
Country	Date	Format	Label
Norway	5 October 2012	CD, digital download	EE Records, Columbia/Sony Music Norway
