= NRK Trafikk =

Norwegian traffic radio service

NRK Trafikk was a traffic radio service operated by NRK until 2025. Its primary function was keeping Norwegians informed with up-to-the-minute traffic information. From 2017, it was also a dedicated DAB radio station.

== Services ==
- Continuous updates: NRK Trafikk's team in Trondheim continuously monitored traffic across Norway, and provided information via radio, NRK.no, the X/Twitter profile and NRK's own programmes.
- Live broadcasts: Traffic reports were transmitter regularly on NRK's radio stations, including NRK Trafikk on DAB, as well as the news programmes on TV and radio.
- 'Traffic Announcement (TA): NRK's DAB transmitter network was divided up into seven regions to provide locally-specific traffic warnings. Important traffic warnings interrupted regular broadcasts, while critical warnings interrupted all NRK signals with the 'TA' system activated. In addition to these broadcasts, it provided a full-on DAB station from 2017 to 2025, described below.
- Contact with the listener: Listeners could call NRK's line to report traffic incidents.
- Collaboration with authorities: NRK Trafikk also worked with the Norwegian Public Roads Administration, the five Traffic Centres and the police to provide accurate information.
- Crisis management: In case of adverse weather conditions, accidents or severe incidents, NRK Trafikk had a critical role in spreading information for helping people to plan safe transport.

== History ==
The service was launched using the DAB+ network. Broadcasts began in test mode on 30 November 2016, while full broadcasts began on 11 January 2017, the same day as the FM network closed in Nordland. NRK Trafikk's predecessor was Trafikkradioen which used RDS technology on the FM network since the late 90s.

The service and team closed after Easter 2025, citing cuts at NRK. The responsibilities were transferred to both the regular news team and the NRK regional services, while the staff of the traffic service moved to other teams.
