= Kringkastingsselskapet =

Norwegian radio station

Kringkastingsselskapet A/S (lit. 'The Broadcasting Company') was Norway's first radio broadcasting service and operated out of Oslo from 1925 until it was taken over by the Norwegian Broadcasting Corporation (NRK) in 1933.

== History ==
The Norwegian Telegraphy Administration started examining the question of radio broadcasting in 1922. After consulting other countries, it recommended that the government own and operate the transmission infrastructure. In 1923, Norway abolished its earlier ban on listening to foreign radio stations without a permit. At the same time, obtaining a license to transmit was a legal requirement. Several companies had already banded together in 1922, intending to obtain permission to broadcast. The financing of their broadcasting operations was based on the revenues received from on-air advertising and the license fees payable by those purchasing and owning a radio set. To avoid some of the problems encountered in the United States, the administration tried to restrict the extent to which the manufacturers of radio sets could also own broadcasting stations.

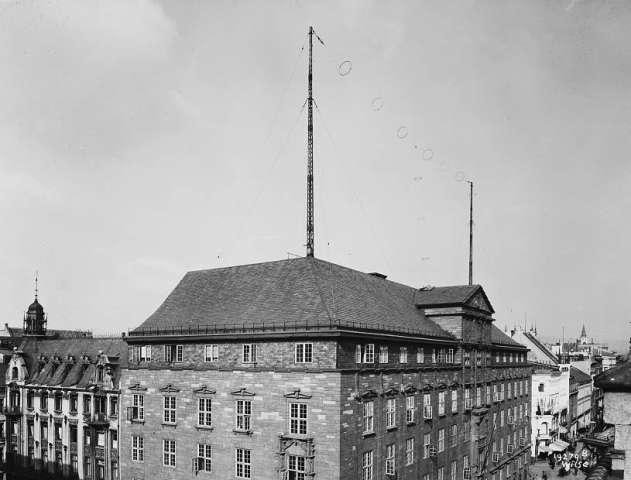
Kringkastingsselskapet's offices and first transmitter

Kringkastingsselskapet was granted the first permit in 1924. It had more than 2000 shareholders, the largest of whom were the Marconi Company, Telefunken, and Western Electric. The company had a permit to establish a transmitter in Oslo with a range of 150 kilometers (93 mi). Although owned by Kringkastingsselskapet, this was operated by the Telegraphy Administration. An additional five transmitters were built in Eastern Norway during the 1920s. These included Rjukan in 1925, Notodden and Porsgrunn in 1926, and Hamar and Fredrikstad in 1927. Norway was allocated three broadcasting frequencies in the Geneva Plan, which became effective in November 1926. Further radio stations were established in Bergen in 1925, Tromsø in 1926, and Ålesund in 1927.

Kringkastingselskapet received permission to operate in most of the country from 1928. A scandal hit the broadcasting company in 1929, in which a new transmitter at Lambertseter in Oslo had too little effect, and secondly, following the discovery of management, was enriching themselves. The former was caused by the Telegraphy Administration's not fully understanding the impact of radio transmission during the design and under-dimensioning of the transmitter. The issue was resolved when the manufacturer, Telefunken, took the cost of converting it from medium wave to shortwave. New transmitters were installed in Kristiansand, Stavanger, and Trondheim in 1930, Bodø in 1931, Narvik in 1934, and Vigra in 1935.

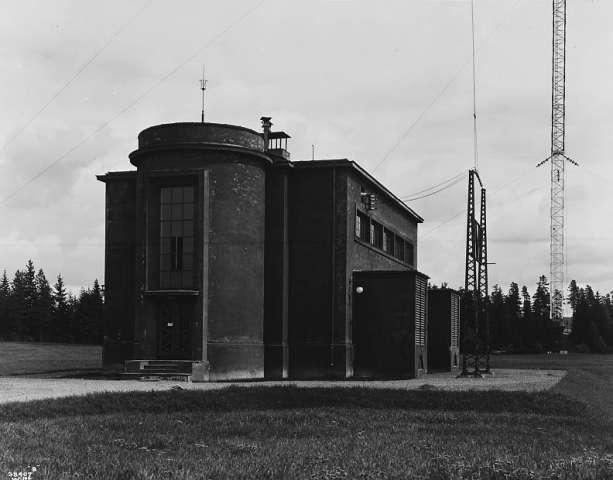
Lambertseter Transmitter in 1931

The scandal resulted in a proposal for a new broadcasting organization. At first, Minister of Trade and Industry Lars Oftedal proposed a model whereby the transmission would be the responsibility of the Telegraphy Administration, and a new, private program company would be established, owned by the Oslo newspapers. This was opposed by Minister of Education and Church Affairs Sigvald Hasund, who did not want the sensation-oriented capital press to control the radio and wanted the government to have control. Mowinckel's Second Cabinet's successor in 1931, Kolstad's Cabinet, supported Hasund's line and, in 1932, proposed that the government take responsibility for content. By the time the issue was being voted over by Parliament, Mowinckel's Third Cabinet was in place, suggesting that the budgetary responsibility lies with the broadcasting company, not the Telegraphy Administration. The Norwegian Broadcasting Corporation was established in 1933 as a government-owned national broadcaster.
