= World So Cold (A-Lee song) =

Single by A-Lee

from the album Forever Lost
- Released: May 5, 2010
- Recorded: April 2010; Krypton Sound Planet (Oslo, Norway)
- Genre: Pop, hip hop, electropop, dance-pop
- Length: 4:04
- Label: EE Records, Columbia/Sony Music Norway
- Songwriters: Ali Pirzad-Amoli, Bjarte Giske, Morten Pape, Christian Thomassen
- Producer: Ground Rules

A-Lee singles chronology
"World So Cold" (2010)	"The One" (2011)

"World So Cold" is a song by Norwegian recording artist A-Lee from his second studio album, Forever Lost (2012). It was released on May 5, 2010, in Norway, on EE Records and Columbia/Sony Music Norway. A-Lee worked with producers Ground Rules and the chorus features vocals from Marcus Only.

"World So Cold" is A-Lee's breakthrough single and it sold Platinum in Norway and reached #12 at Norwegian Single Charts VG-Lista. The single was the most played song on radio NRK mP3 in 2010 and was also the 6th most played song on all Norwegian radio in 2010.
In 2010, A-Lee performed "World So Cold" at huge annual show VG-Lista Rådhusplassen in Oslo where he attended for the first time.

== Track listing ==
No.	Title	Writer(s)	Producer(s)	Length
1.	"World So Cold"	Ali Pirzad-Amoli, Bjarte Giske, Morten Pape, Christian Thomassen	Ground Rules	4:04

== Personnel ==
- Dope – artwork design
- Björn Engelmann – mastering
- Shahrouz Ghafourian – executive producer, management
- Bjarte Giske – producer, engineer, mixer
- Marcus Ulstad Nilsen – vocals
- Morten Pape – producer, engineer, mixer
- Ali Pirzad-Amoli – vocals, executive producer

== Chart positions and certifications ==
Chart (2011)	Peak position
Norway (VG-Lista)	12

Country	Certification
IFPI Norway	Platinum

== Release history ==
Country	Date	Format	Label
Norway	5 May 2010	digital download	EE Records, Columbia/Sony Music Norway
