= Kjellaug Nakkim =

Norwegian politician (1940–2022)

Kjellaug Nakkim (2 August 1940 – 16 May 2022) was a Norwegian politician for the Conservative Party.

She was elected to the Norwegian Parliament from Østfold in 1989, and was re-elected on two occasions. She had previously served in the position of deputy representative during the term 1985–1989.

Born in Skiptvet, Nakkim was a member of Moss city council from 1975 to 1987. From 2006 to 2009 she served as chair of the Broadcasting Council in Norway. She had previously been deputy chair.

She was the mother of the journalist Kyrre Nakkim.
