= NRK Folkemusikk =

Radio station in Norway

Coordinates: 59°56′08″N 10°43′08″E

- Available nationwide; Norway
- Broadcast area: Norway
- Frequency: DAB+ national multiplex

Programming
- Language: Norwegian Bokmål
- Format: Norwegian folk music World music

Ownership
- Owner: NRK
- Sister stations: NRK Jazz; NRK Klassisk

History
- First air date: 4 December 2004; 21 years ago
- Former names: NRK Alltid Folkemusikk

Links
- Webcast: radio.nrk.no/direkte/folkemusikk

NRK Folkemusikk is NRK's tenth radio station, and was the first in Norway to be broadcast exclusively via DAB and on the Internet. The station started broadcasting as NRK Alltid Folkemusikk on 7 December 2004 but later simplified its name to the present NRK Folkemusikk.

The station broadcasts music only, without presenters. The music consists of both new and old traditional Norwegian folk music in addition to some world music. The station uses and includes recordings of folk music from the NRK archives, which contain over 50,000 recordings dating from 1934 until today, as well as other recordings.
