= Marienlyst =

Area of Oslo, Norway

Coordinates: 59°56′07″N 10°43′12″E

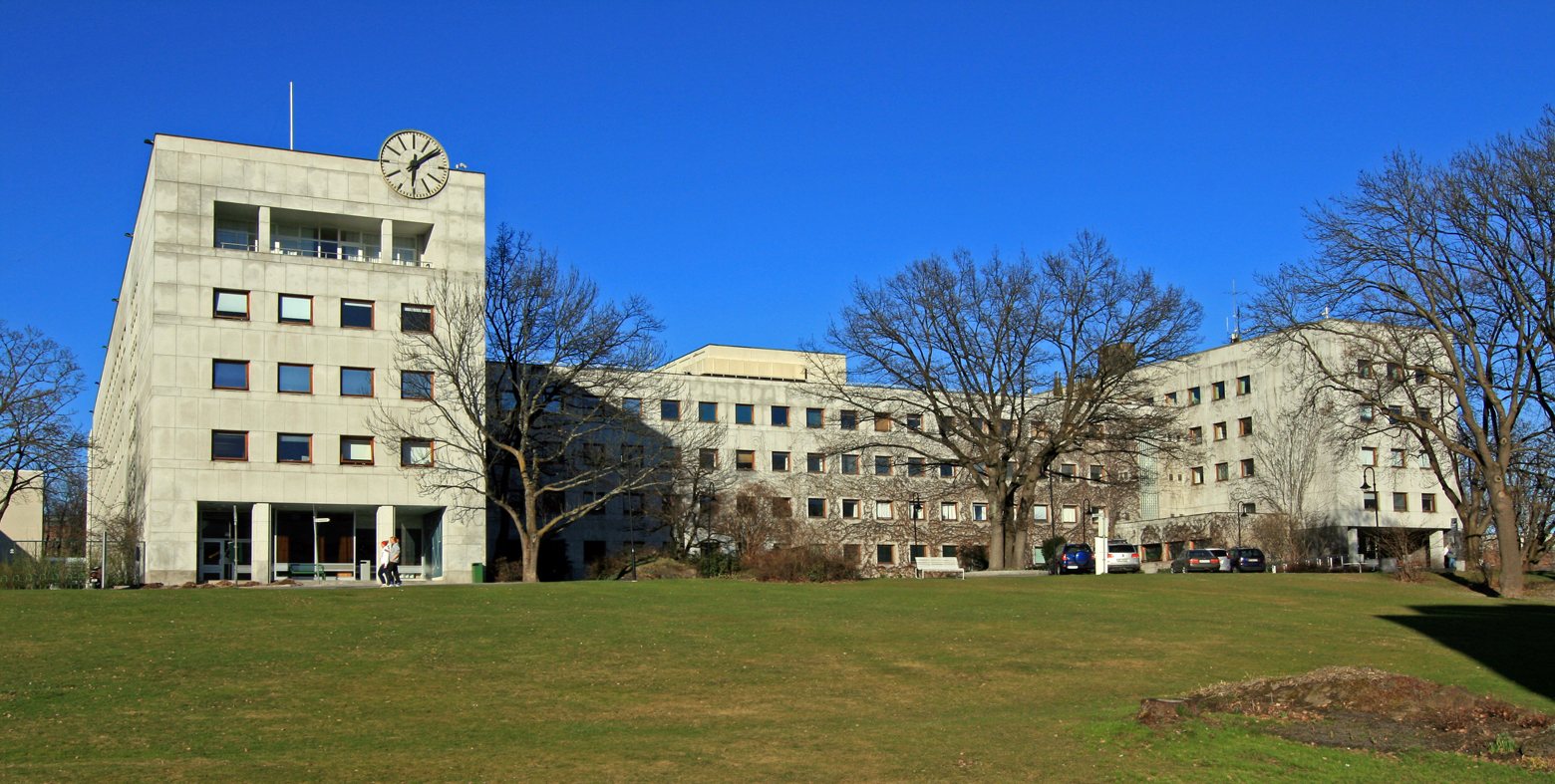
Broadcasting House.

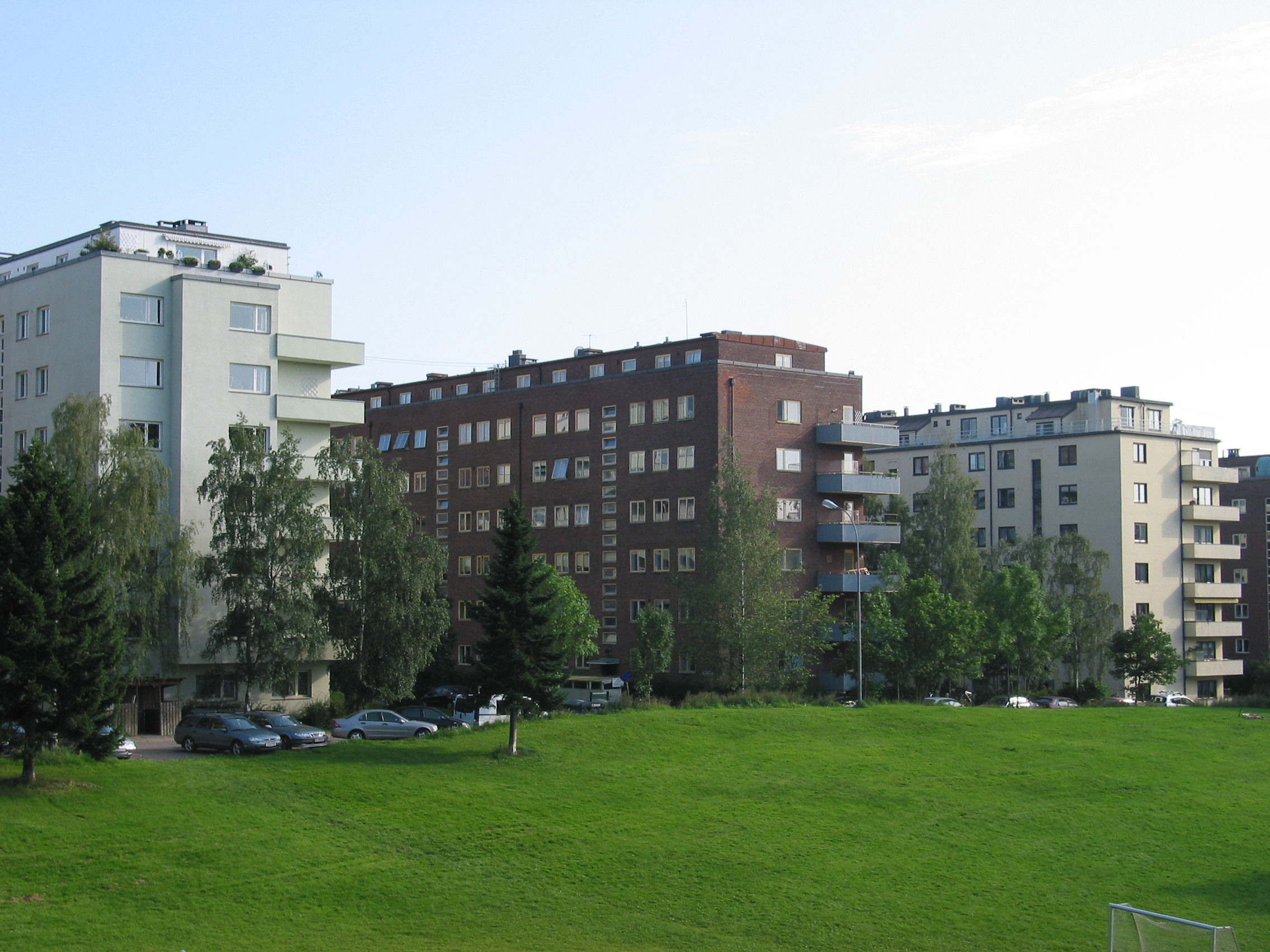
Housing at Marienlyst.

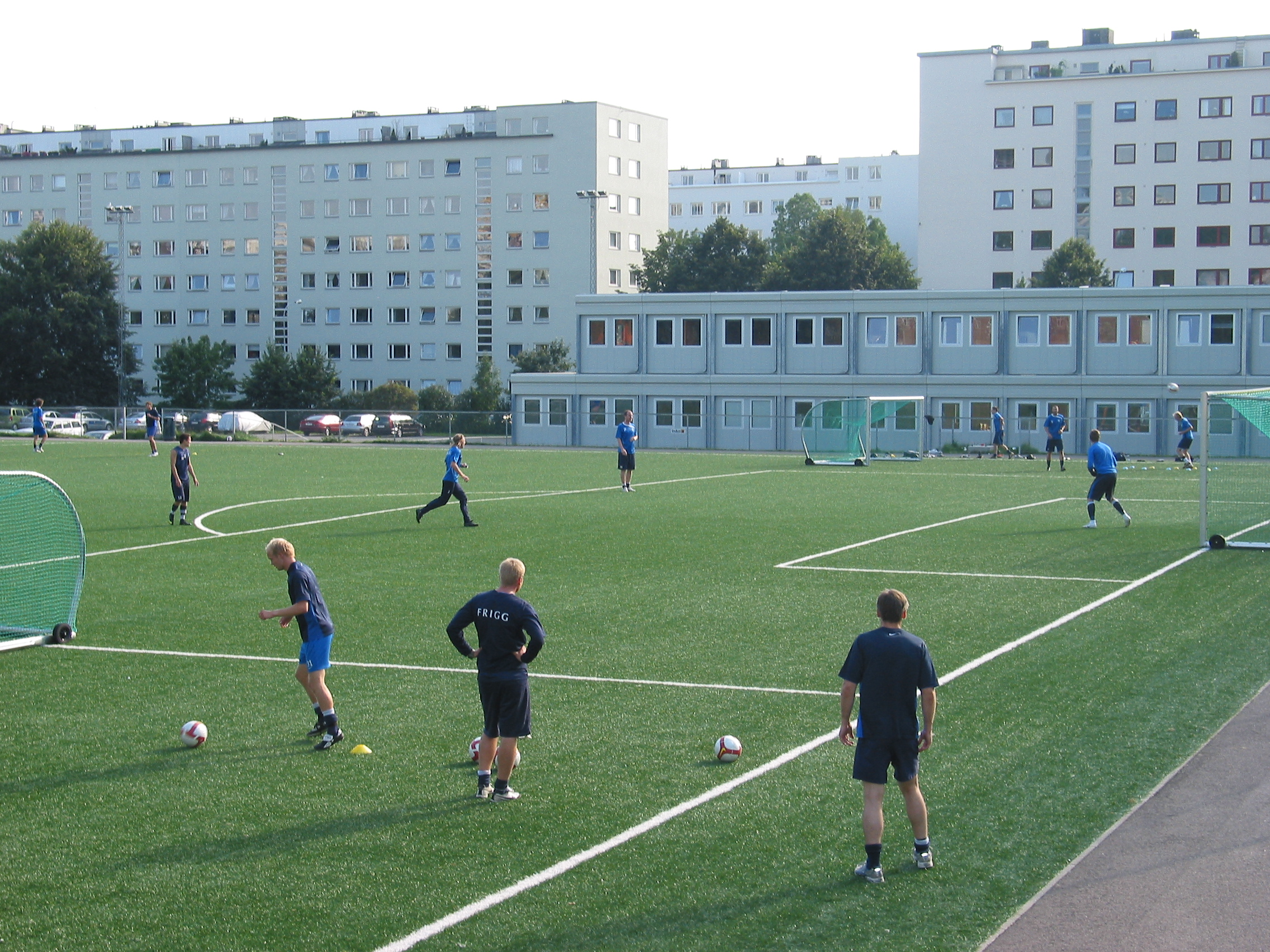
The local football team, FK Frigg Oslo.

Marienlyst is an area in the borough of St. Hanshaugen in Oslo. It is best known as the site of the national headquarters of the Norwegian Broadcasting Corporation (NRK), and "Marienlyst" is often used synonymously with NRK. It is located next to the University of Oslo at Blindern.

== History ==
In 2019, it was announced that the NRK will begin moving out of Marienlyst since the location is too big and no longer suitable for the broadcaster's current needs. The area is planned to be developed into a housing area.

== Architecture ==
The area is characterized by functionalist architecture.

A large area of green fields and sports grounds is located in Marienlyst. There is a football field, a skateboard ramp and tennis courts. The Marienlyst Activity Park and Leisure Club provides activities for children and youth. The area is also used for old people and for parents taking their babies for a walk in the stroller.

=== Marienlyst Minigolfpark ===
The Marienlyst Minigolfpark is a miniature golf course and a tourist location with 18 holes built with rocks from different parts of southern Norway.

=== Marienlyst manor ===
Marienlyst manor (Gård) dates from 1765 and is located at Blindernveien 10. It is currently a public kindergarten.
