= Morgenklubben med Loven & Co =

Norwegian radio show

Morgenklubben med Loven and Co
- Genre: Talk, humor, music
- Running time: Weekdays 5.58–10.00am
- Country of origin: Norway
- Language: Norwegian
- Home station: Radio Norge
- Executive producer: Øystein Weibell
- Recording studio: Oslo, Norway
- Original release: 7 September 2009
- Audio format: FM and Digital radio
- Website: Official Website

Morgenklubben med Loven & Co (The Morning Show with Loven & Co) is a popular Norwegian radio show, airing weekdays from 5:58 am to 10:00 am on Radio Norge. It is currently hosted by comedian Øyvind Loven, comedian Geir Schau, and Kim Johanne Dahl.

On the air since 2009, the show has grown to immense popularity in Norway, and is one of the most popular radio shows in the country, and has often been credited as being a great part of the channels success.

The show has however suffered from some controversy, most stemming from the Friday segment Geirs Grovis (Geirs' dirty joke), where every week, host Geir Schau tells a dirty joke on the air at exactly 9:10 am.
