= NRK regional services =

Norwegian regional public broadcasting

For the purpose of regional broadcasting on NRK, Norway is divided into 11 districts. 10 of these districts follow county boundaries and provide services in the Norwegian language, while one overlaps the other districts and provides services in the Sami languages. Each district includes one district office along with several subordinate local offices.

Regional broadcasting output generally comes from the district offices, though some of the local offices contain newsrooms and production facilities able to supplement output from the district office or produce separate programming altogether. Regional services include the following radio and TV output:

== Radio ==
NRK's P1 radio channel carries regional programming on Mondays through Fridays from 6.03 to 9.00 local time (including national news summaries on the hour and half hour) and from 14.03 to 17.00 (with national news at 15.00 and 16.00), as well as two-minute regional news updates each hour from 9.03 to 16.03 inclusive. On Saturdays there are two-minute regional bulletins at 8.03, 9.03, and 10.03. These programmes come from 15 different offices (including one for the capital).

P1 is broadcast digitally (via DAB+ and satellite) as well as being available on cable and via the internet. Analogue broadcasting on FM – hitherto the channel's main method of transmission – ended in 2017.

== Television ==
NRK1 carries regional news, produced at the district offices, Mondays through Thursdays from 19.45 to 20.00 and 22.55–23.00 and Fridays from 19.30 to 19.40. Except during the summer holiday period, all regional news programmes are repeated nationwide in a 150-minute sequence on NRK2 overnight as well as in the later part of the following morning.

== Norwegian language districts ==
District	Coverage Area	District Office	Local Offices	Website (in Norwegian)	Internet radio
NRK Innlandet	Innlandet	Lillehammer	Gjøvik; Hamar (Newsroom); Kongsvinger; Leira	www.nrk.no/innlandet/	P1 Innlandet
NRK Møre og Romsdal	Møre og Romsdal	Ålesund	Kristiansund; Molde; Ulsteinvik	www.nrk.no/mr/	P1 Møre og Romsdal
NRK Nordland	Nordland	Bodø	Brønnøysund; Mo i Rana; Narvik; Svolvær	www.nrk.no/nordland/	P1 Nordland
NRK Østlandet	Oslo; Akershus; Buskerud; Østfold	Fredrikstad	Drammen (Newsroom); Fredrikstad (Newsroom); Ål	www.nrk.no/osloogviken/	P1 Buskerud; P1 Stor-Oslo; P1 Østfold
NRK Rogaland	Rogaland	Stavanger	Haugesund	www.nrk.no/rogaland/	P1 Rogaland
NRK Sørlandet	Agder	Kristiansand	Arendal; Flekkefjord	www.nrk.no/sorlandet/	P1 Sørlandet
NRK Troms og Finnmark	Troms; Finnmark	Tromsø	Alta (Newsroom); Finnsnes; Hammerfest; Harstad; Kirkenes; Vadsø	www.nrk.no/tromsogfinnmark/	P1 Finnmark; P1 Troms
NRK Trøndelag	Trøndelag	Trondheim	Brekstad; Namsos; Steinkjer (Newsroom)	www.nrk.no/trondelag/	P1 Trøndelag
NRK Vestfold og Telemark	Vestfold; Telemark	Porsgrunn	Bø; Tønsberg (Newsroom)	www.nrk.no/vestfoldogtelemark/	P1 Telemark; P1 Vestfold
NRK Vestland	Vestland	Bergen	Førde (Newsroom); Leirvik; Nordfjordeid; Odda; Sogndalsfjøra	www.nrk.no/vestland/	P1 Hordaland; P1 Sogn og Fjordane

== Sami language district ==
District	District Office	Local Offices	Available at DAB+	Website (in Sami & Norwegian)	Internet radio
NRK Sápmi	Kárášjohka (Karasjok)	Bådåddjo (Bodø); Dálošvággi (Olderdalen); Deanušaldi (Tana bru); Gásluokta (Kjøpsvik); Guovdageaidnu (Kautokeino); Háštá (Harstad); Olsove (Oslo); Romsa (Tromsø); Snåase (Snåsa)	Nationwide in Norway	www.nrk.no/sapmi//	NRK Sápmi
