= Radio Norge =

- Bergen; Norway
- Broadcast area: Norway - National FM

Programming
- Format: easy listening

Ownership
- Owner: Bauer Media Group
- Sister stations: NRJ; P24-7 FUN; P24-7 HOT Country; P24-7 KOS; P24-7 MIX; Radio Rock; Radio Topp 40; Radio Vinyl

History
- First air date: 1 January 2004

Links
- Website: http://radionorge.com

If you are looking for the military radio station with the same name, see Radio Norge (1978–1991).

Radio Norge (formerly Kanal 4 and Kanal 24) is a Norwegian radio station with headquarters in Bergen. It is subsidiary of Bauer Media AS. Radio Norge replaced Kanal 24 at noon on 21 April 2008, with a new profile decided by their listeners. They previously had a campaign called Norge bestemmer (Norway decides), where they wanted the visitors opinion about what they wanted in the new station. The station focuses in playing the best hits from the last four decades along with today's popular pop hits. CEO is Bente Klemetsdal.

== Shows on Radio Norge ==
The first show ever on Radio Norge, was Lunsj with Annette Walter Numme, and producer Øystein Weibell which went on the air at noon, and was on the air for two hours. Other shows:

- Morgenklubben med Loven & Co with Geir Schau, Henriette Lien, Jakob Arvola and Øyvind Loven (6am-10am)
- Topp 10 klokka 10 with Rune Dahl (10am-12pm)
- Kultur with Kim Nygård (12pm-2pm)
- Krokens ettermiddag with Tomm-Espen Kroken (2pm-6pm)
- Norgesmagasinet with Glenn Due-Sørensen (6pm-7pm)
- Popcorn with Gro Sivertsen and Arne Martin Vistnes(7pm-8pm)
- God kveld with Ole Morten Føreland (8pm-11pm)

== History ==
Kanal 24 was awarded the license for the so-called FM4 network in 2003, which since 1994 had been occupied by P4. The Minister of Culture, Valgerd Svarstad Haugland announced the new station, which at that time was called Kanal4 as the winner of the FM4-license. P4 later received the license for the so-called FM5 network. Because of this, Kanal 24 took over the frequencies used previously by P4, while the latter got new, previously unused frequencies.

Kanal 24 had a rough start. Partially because P4 claiming the name Kanal 4 was too similar, and P4 also shut down their old transmitters before Kanal 24 went on the air on 1 January 2004. The main investors in Kanal 24 where TV 2, Fædrelandsvennen and Adresseavisen, who have since sold their shares.

== Hosts on Radio Norge ==
- Geir Schau
- Øyvind Loven
- Kim Nygård
- Anette Walther Numme
- Thea Hope
- Samantha Skogrand
- Kim Johanne Dahl
- Marte Sveberg
- Kristian Rønning

== Previous shows on Kanal 24 ==
- Bergestuen direkte
- S.A.A.B
- Canal Royal
- Nyhetspuls 17
- Sportspuls 18
- Plankehytta
- Minipuls
- JÅNG
- Hei, Rune!
- Pling - rock og fotball
- Superstreng
- Gråsonen
- DJ Alias
- Brunch
- Zulu
- Endelig voksen
- Ærlig talt
- 80-tallet
- Transistor
- Kommisjonen
