= Elisabeth Carew =

Norwegian singer and songwriter

- Born: Elisabeth Carew; 13 June 1985 (age 40); Lørenskog Municipality, Norway
- Genres: Pop; R&B
- Occupations: Singer; songwriter
- Website: http://elisabethcarew.blogg.no

Elisabeth Carew (born 13 June 1985) is a Norwegian singer and songwriter. Carew is best known for competing in Melodi Grand Prix 2010 and 2014.

== Career ==
=== Melodi Grand Prix 2010 ===
In 2009, Carew was announced as one of the 21 contestants competing in Melodi Grand Prix 2010, the Norwegian national selection for the Eurovision Song Contest 2010. Carew competed in the first semi-final on 8 January 2010 in Ørland hovedflystasjon in Ørland Municipality with the song "Rocketfuel". She placed 6th out of seven competing songs and was eliminated.

=== Melodi Grand Prix 2014 ===
In 2014, Carew was announced as one of the contestants in the Norwegian national selection for the Eurovision Song Contest 2014, Melodi Grand Prix 2014. She is competing with the song "Sole Survivor". Carew competed in the third semi-final on 9 March 2014 at the Folketeatret in Oslo. She advanced to the finals, which was held on 15 March 2014 in Oslo Spektrum. Despite being a considered a favourite to win the competition, Carew did not make the superfinal and placed 5th-9th in the final.

== Personal life ==
Carew is the younger sister of Norwegian footballer John Carew. Her father is Gambian and her mother is Norwegian.
