= NRK Jazz =

Norwegian radio station

- Oslo, Norway; Norway

Programming
- Format: Jazz music

Ownership
- Owner: Norwegian Broadcasting Corporation

History
- First air date: 2 July 2007

Technical information
- Transmitter coordinates: 59°55′0″N 10°44′0″E

Links
- Webcast: https://radio.nrk.no/direkte/jazz
- Website: radio.nrk.no/direkte/jazz

NRK Jazz's first logo from 2007 to 2013

NRK Jazz's second logo from 2013 to 2022

NRK Jazz is a Norwegian radio station operated by the Norwegian Broadcasting Corporation (NRK) that broadcasts Norwegian and European jazz music on DAB digital radio and the internet.
