= P4 Radio Hele Norge =

Norwegian radio company

P4 Radio Hele Norge AS
- Type: Public
- Industry: Radio
- Founded: 1993
- Headquarters: Lillehammer, Norway
- Area served: Norway
- Number of employees: 76 (2026)
- Parent: Viaplay Group
- Website: lydenavnorge.no

P4 Radio Hele Norge AS Norway's leading national, private radio station with 24% national market share, about one million daily listeners and two million weekly.

P4 Radio Hele Norge operates a nationwide public service-licence, with official requirements for news and information. It broadcasts via DAB+ and on the Internet. On 1 November 2006 the company launched an all-rock music station, Bandit, available via internet streaming, and previously also on DAB.

The headquarters is located in Lillehammer, with regional representation and broadcast-studios in Oslo. P4 have previously been represented with studios and offices in Sarpsborg, Bergen, Tromsø, Stavanger, Kristiansand and Trondheim.

== Logo history ==
1994 to 2014

== Radio Stations ==
- P4
- P5 Hits
- P6 Rock
- P7 Klem
- P8 Pop
- P9 Retro
- P10 Country
- P11 Dance
- P12 Hitmix

== See also ==
- Radio Norge: PFI's main radio competitor and former holder of the Norwegian P4 FM frequencies.
