= NRK =

Norwegian state-owned public broadcaster

Coordinates: 59°56′6.21″N 10°43′6.79″E

Norwegian Broadcasting Corporation
- NRK's corporate logo since 1970 (Note: Minor changes to the logo were made in 1999.)
- Native name: Norsk rikskringkasting AS
- Type: Publicly funded Aksjeselskap
- Industry: Broadcasting
- Predecessor: Kringkastingsselskapet A/S (1925)
- Founded: 1 July 1933; 93 years ago
- Headquarters: Oslo, Norway
- Key people: Vibeke Fürst Haugen (Director General)
- Products: TV; radio; online services
- Owner: Royal Norwegian Ministry of Culture and Equality
- Number of employees: 3,419; 266 temporary staff (2017)
- Website: nrk.no

The Norwegian Broadcasting Corporation (Norwegian: Norsk rikskringkasting, lit. 'Norwegian Realm Broadcasting'), commonly known by its initialism NRK, is the Norwegian public broadcasting, radio corporation and news website. The corporation is state-owned, guided by its bylaws and ethical guidelines, with a board partly appointed by the government, through the Ministry of Culture and Equality, and elected by staff. Its bylaws and ethical guidelines secure independent editorial control for journalists and editors.

NRK broadcasts three national TV channels and thirteen national radio channels on digital terrestrial television, digital terrestrial radio and subscription television. They also offer an online video on-demand and podcast streaming service, and produce online and broadcast news.

The NRK is a founding member of the European Broadcasting Union and a member of the Norwegian Press Association.

== Financing ==
Until the start of 2020, about 94% of NRK's funding came from a mandatory annual licence fee payable by anyone who owns or uses a TV or device capable of receiving TV broadcasts. The remainder came from commercial activities such as programme and DVD sales, spin-off products, and certain types of sponsorships. NRK's license income in 2012 was more than 5 billion NOK. In the autumn of 2015, the government announced that it planned to change the way NRK is financed. This was in part a reaction to the decline of TV ownership in Norway. From the start of 2020, NRK funding is an item in the national budget and the costs are covered through taxation for each individual liable for income taxes in Norway.

== History ==
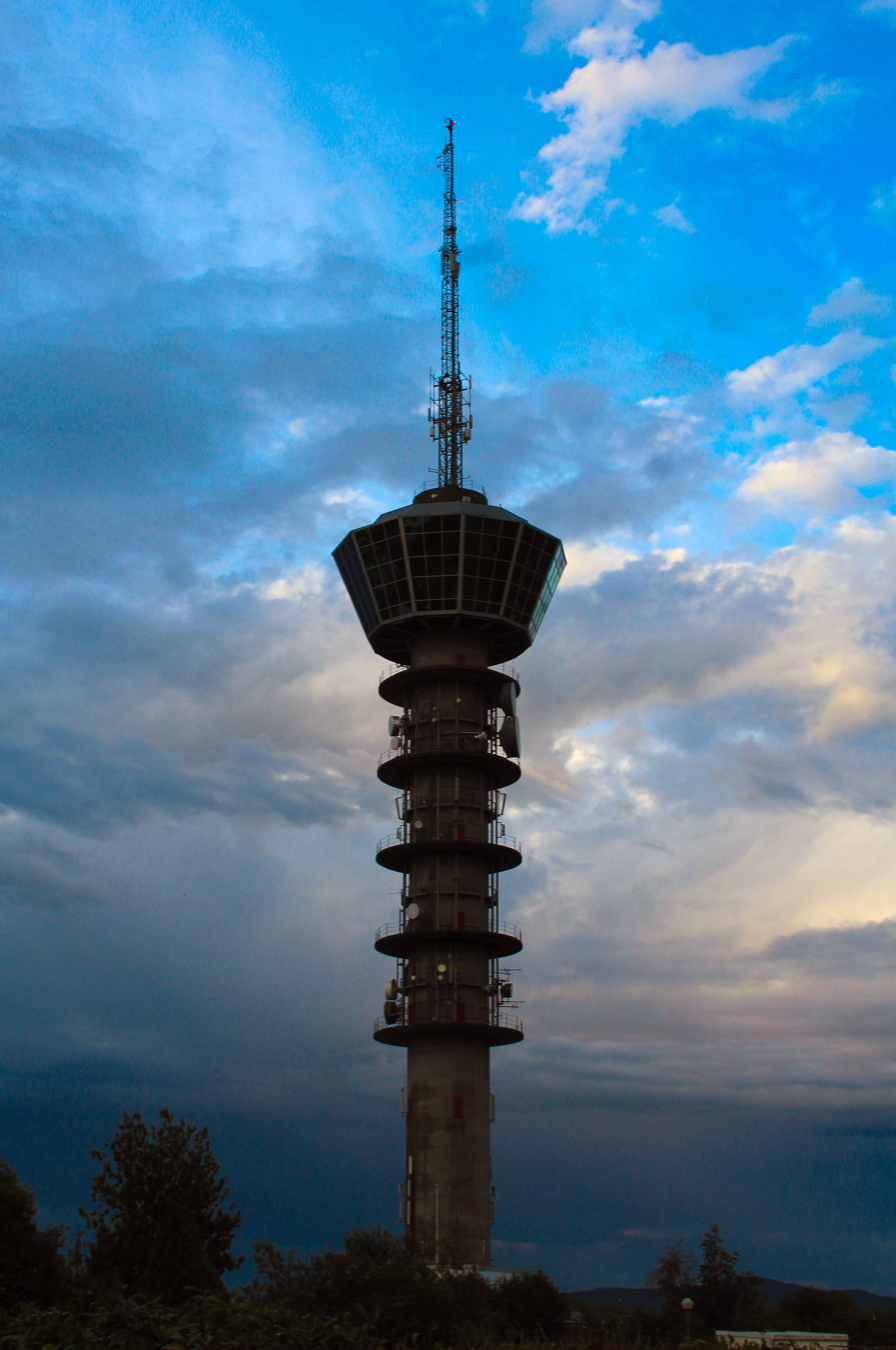
NRK television tower in Trondheim

Kringkastingsselskapet A/S, a privately owned company and the predecessor of NRK, started regular radio broadcasts in Norway in 1925. NRK itself was founded in 1933. Based on a model similar to that of the BBC and located in Oslo, it was a replacement for privately operated radio stations in larger cities. NRK initially set out to cover the entire country and had a monopoly on broadcasting in Norway. The monopoly came under intense pressure when Norwegian TV companies began broadcasting from abroad in addition to international cable TV. Cable TV started in 1982 and satellite TV in 1986 (the launch of TV3 in 1987 and TVNorge in 1988). It was not until the launch of TV 2 on 5 September 1992, that NRK's monopoly on television broadcasting in Norway ended.

During the Nazi German occupation, Norwegian transmitters were used to broadcast Nazi German war propaganda to Northern Europe (particularly Scotland and the northern half of Ireland, where the sea path ensured a good signal) and Scandinavia.

Prior to the Nazi German occupation, NRK had also been partly financed by radio commercials.

NRK was one of 23 founding broadcasting organisations of the European Broadcasting Union, which was founded in 1950. In 1954, NRK started broadcasting television shows, on a trial basis. Regular broadcasts started in 1960.

On 14 September 1970, it began providing television services to Longyearbyen in Svalbard. In 1970, NRK would adopt their iconic logo design.

NRK was the last of the major European public broadcasters to introduce a second radio station, officially starting as late as 1984. In 1993, NRK launched a third radio station, the youth-oriented P3. A 24-hour station for classical music, Alltid Klassisk (now called "NRK Klassisk"), introduced in 1995, was the first of its kind to be broadcast digitally using digital audio broadcasting. The 24-hour news station Alltid Nyheter started in 1997, followed by a radio station for teenagers, mP3 in 2000, which mostly plays pop music.

On 1 September 1996, a second television channel called NRK2 was launched. The original television channel is now known as NRK1. On 3 September 2007, NRK launched its third channel: a youth channel called NRK3. Later that year, on 1 December, NRK launched its fourth television channel, NRK Super, which is aimed at children. NRK3 and NRK Super share the same channel, with NRK Super broadcasting from 06:00 to 19:30 and NRK3 from 19:30 to 06:00.

In 2000, following NRK Interaktiv's relaunch as NRK.no, NRK redesigned its corporate logo (that was introduced in 1969), so that it could be similar to its old version. This new version of NRK's corporate logo made its first appearance in an ident in 2001 by making its overhaul to NRK's radio and television channels.

A traditional music radio station, NRK Alltid folkemusikk (now known as "NRK Folkemusikk") was launched in 2004 on DAB and internet radio.

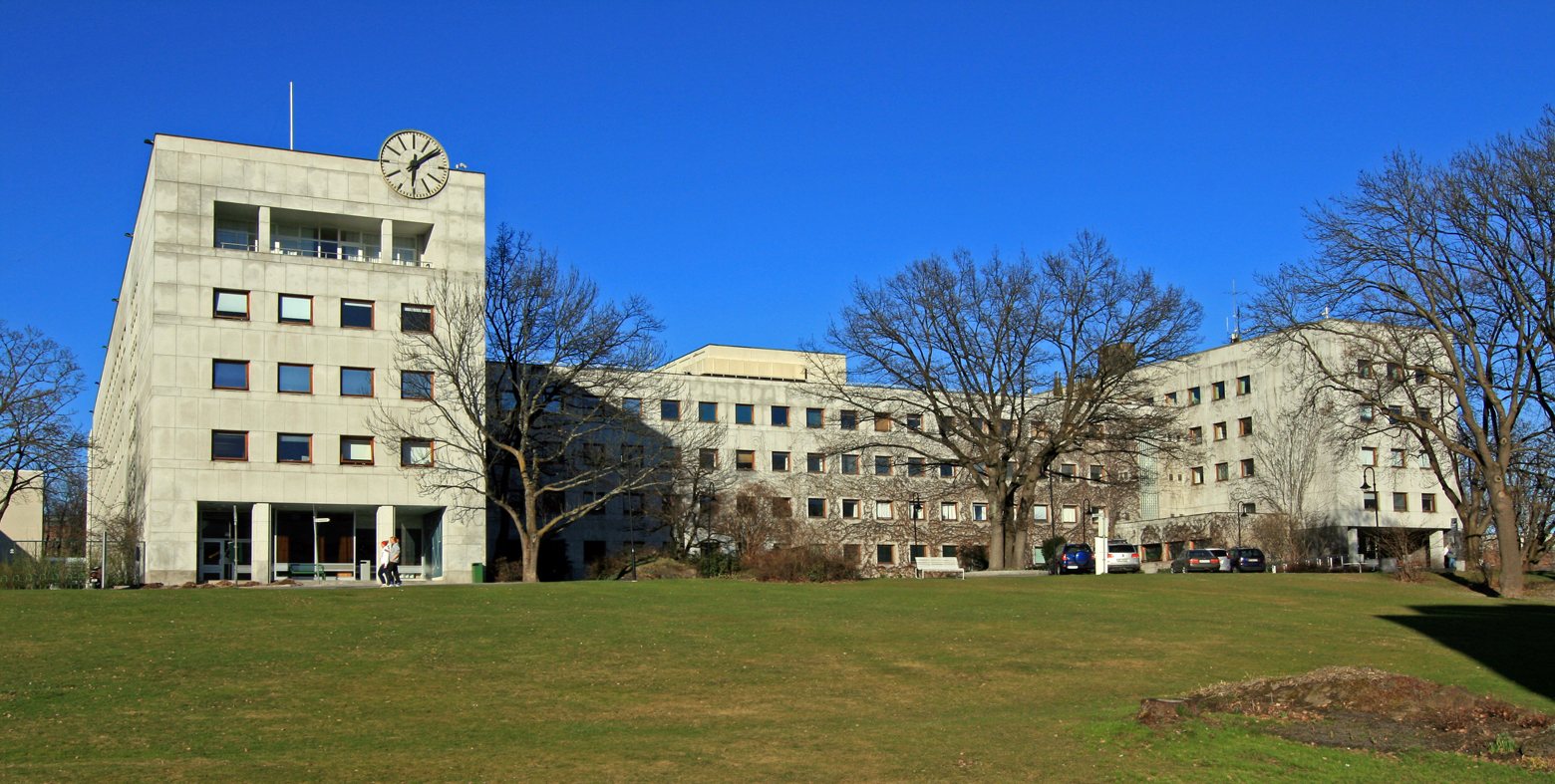
Broadcasting House, one of the main buildings at NRK headquarters at Marienlyst, Oslo

NRK's international radio transmissions, known as Utenlandssendingen, began shortwave transmission in 1948. Initially broadcasting in Norwegian, English-language programs were added later. The service was discontinued on 1 January 2002. All NRK broadcasting activities on shortwave ceased on 1 January 2004. NRK's mediumwave transmitter at Kvitsøy on 1314 kHz used to be widely heard internationally and was one of the most commonly heard trans-Atlantic DX signals in eastern North America. The frequency carried a mixture of NRK's radio channels P1 and P2, and was called Europakanalen (lit. 'The Europe Channel'). However, these mediumwave transmissions were discontinued on 1 July 2006.

All of NRK's radio stations are now available on the internet. Several of NRK's television programmes are also available on the internet.

On 16 April 2015, the Norwegian Ministry of Culture announced its intention to eventually switch off all FM transmitters in the country, with the first such transmitter expected to be switched off on 11 January 2017, therefore making Norway the first country in the world to completely transition to digital radio. According to the Ministry of Culture, the decision was justified because transmitting through the FM network was eight times more expensive than transmitting through digital audio broadcasting, and because only five national radio stations are transmitting on FM, compared to the 42 digital radio stations allocated in Norway, with 22 stations transmitting on the latter. NRK Radio is expected to transition from FM to digital radio before commercial radio stations do so.

NRK claimed to have the longest-running radio show, Lørdagsbarnetimen (lit. 'The Saturday Children's Hour'), which ran from 1924 to 2010.

=== Redevelopment of Marienlyst and relocation of its headquarters ===
In 2017, NRK asked five architectural firms to present sketches for possible development and use of NRK's area at Marienlyst, should NRK move rather than improve the property. In 2019, work began to find the best site for a new building, and in 2020 the property on Marienlyst was sold to Ferd Eiendom for NOK 3.75 billion.

Close to 100 different locations were considered for the new head office, but Gamle Oslo, Bryn, Storo Løren, Lillestrøm-Puls and Lilleaker were the most relevant options. Director of relocation Jon Espen Lohne in NRK, said in 2020 that they have ambitions to get the country to choose a site before the end of the year. In May 2021, it was announced that NRK had decided to move to Ensjø, and that the price for the property was NOK 800 million.

=== FM radio switch-off ===
Norway was the first country to announce a complete switch-off of national FM radio stations, including NRK P1 with regional services, NRK P2 and NRK P3, NRK mP3 and NRK Alltid Nyheter. Switch off started on 11 January 2017, and ended on 13 December 2017.

From 2018, all FM transmitters are replaced with broadcast via DAB+, internet and cable.

== Organisation ==
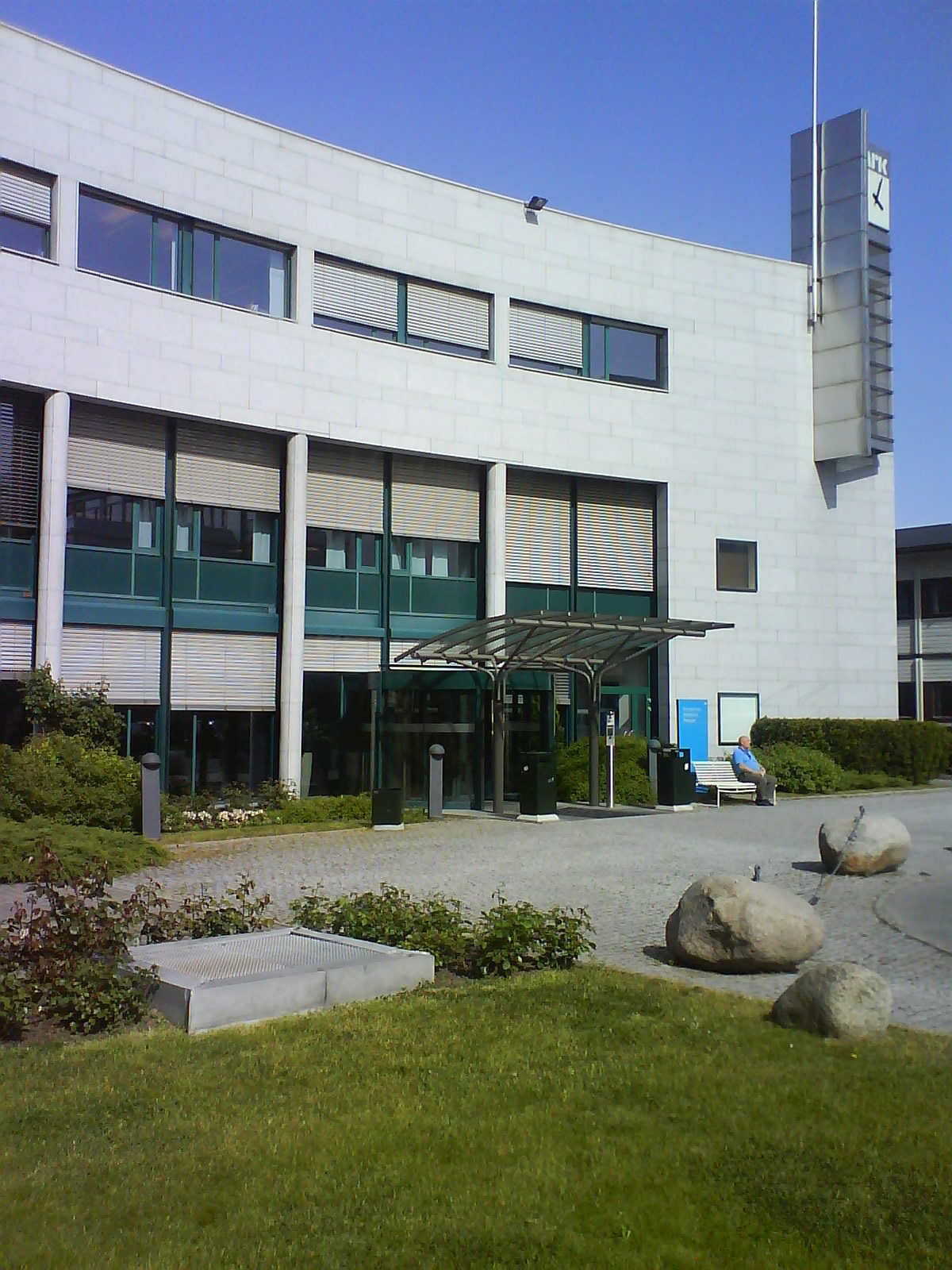
Entrance to Television House, another building at NRK's headquarters

The CEO began major organisational changes in 2008, with the aim of creating a more agile NRK, while still adhering to the principles of the broadcaster-producer model introduced in January 2001. By January 2009, the number of programme-producing divisions had been reduced from five to three, separated more along geographical than functional lines, and at the same time simplifying trading in the internal market. The programme-producing divisions are:

- Marienlyst covering all facilities in Oslo
- Distrikt, encompassing all regional offices and with their headquarters in Trondheim
- Sami, the producer of Sámi programmes situated in Karasjok

Vibeke Fürst Haugen has been director-general of the Norwegian Broadcasting Corporation since 29 April 2022. The previous directors were Olav Midttun (1934–1947, except during the Nazi occupation), Kaare Fostervoll (1948–1962), Hans Jacob Ustvedt (1962–1971), Torolf Elster (1972–1981), Bjartmar Gjerde (1981–1988), Einar Førde (1989–2001), John G. Bernander (2001–2007), Hans-Tore Bjerkaas (2007–2012) and Thor Gjermund Eriksen (2012–2022). After WW2, all but Hans-Tore Bjerkaas and John G. Bernander had been active politically in socialist parties. The current director-general, Vibeke Fürst Haugen, came from the position of director of the Marienlyst-division of NRK in Oslo.

The chairman of the board is Birger Magnus, Marius Lillelien heads the broadcasting department, and the head of the news department is Marius Tetlie. In 2017, NRK employed 3419 and 266 temporary staff.

NRK is organized as a state-owned limited company where the Ministry of Culture appoints the board. And where the board appoints the director general. The Norwegian Parliament and the Ministry set the framework for NRK's activities through the Broadcasting Act, the articles of association for NRK AS, and the NRK Charter. These laws and regulations provide guidelines for how NRK should perform its duties as a public broadcaster in Norway. This role of the Norwegian government appointing board members to NRK can be seen as government-influence, but then only in its organizational entity form. The NRK Charter and Ethical Guidelines guarantee full editorial freedom to journalists and editors.

== Notable television programmes ==
=== NRK productions ===
- Dagsrevyen
- Fleksnes
- Landsskytterstevnet
- Melodi Grand Prix (Norwegian national selection for the Eurovision Song Contest)
- Nytt på nytt
- Ođđasat
- Skam
- Skavlan

=== Other shows ===
- Eurovision Song Contest 1986, Eurovision Song Contest 1996 and Eurovision Song Contest 2010
- Sakte-tv (slow television)
- Spellemannprisen

== Channels ==
=== Television ===
- NRK1
- NRK2
- NRK3 / NRK Super
- NRK Tegnspråk

=== Radio ===
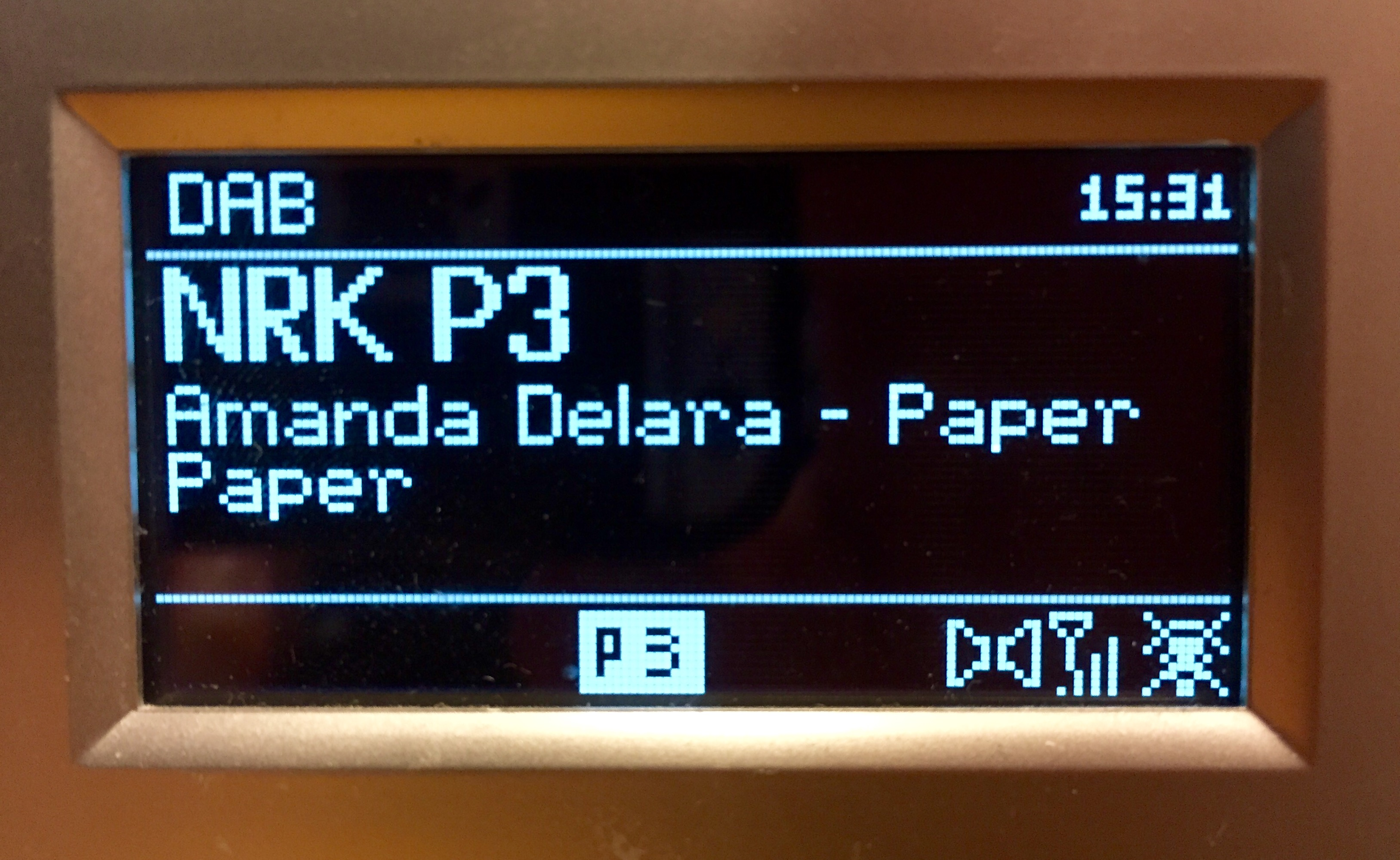
NRK P3 on DAB

- NRK P1 – Generalist channel, with regional opt-outs.
- NRK P1+ – A spin-off from P1, targeting elderly audience.
- NRK P2 – Cultural channel.
- NRK P3 – Youth-oriented channel.
- NRK P3 Musikk – 24/7 music.
- NRK mP3 – 24/7 dance music (also called mP3).
- NRK Nyheter – 24/7 news, including news in Swedish (Dagens Eko) and English (BBC World Service).
- NRK Sport – Sports events with commentary, basic match score updates, and varied music the rest of the time.
- NRK Sápmi – in Sami languages.
- NRK Super – Radio version of the TV channel; 24/7. The vast majority of music is in Norwegian and themed around school life.
- NRK Folkemusikk – 24/7 traditional Norwegian folk music.
- NRK Jazz – broadcasts Norwegian and European jazz music uninterruptedly
- NRK Klassisk – 24/7 classical music.
- NRK Vær — Weather service on DAB+. Offshore shipping weather reports, in regional versions.

=== Regional broadcasting ===
NRK has 12 regional offices around Norway. Each office has its own broadcasts on both television (on NRK 1) and radio (on NRK P1), as well their own news sites on the internet. They also contribute news coverage to national news programmes. NRK's headquarters are at Marienlyst in Oslo and Tyholt in Trondheim.

=== International carriage ===
Most original productions are available globally free of charge on NRK's VoD service NRK TV, including those listed in the "NRK productions" section above.

NRK1, NRK2, and NRK3 are known to be carried by some Swedish, Danish and Icelandic pay-TV providers, while NRK1 and NRK2 are carried by some Finnish, Ålandic, Faroese and Greenlandic providers.

Yle Mondo, which broadcasts on FM in the greater Helsinki area, carries half an hour of unspecified NRK radio shows in Norwegian on weekdays at 13:30 as of November 2023.

== Criticism and controversies ==
=== 2019 NRK Facebook controversy ===
In July 2019, a cartoon produced and posted on NRK's Facebook page was widely panned for antisemitism. It featured an orthodox Jew participating in a game of Scrabble, where his opponent is hesitant to lay down his point-scoring yet deeply offensive word jødesvin (lit. 'Jew swine'). The network received over 300 complaint letters. NRK denied accusations of antisemitism, but removed the description "tag a Jew" from the video. The network previously apologised for spoofing the Holocaust in a 2016 cartoon, which has not been removed.

== See also ==
- List of Norwegian-language radio stations
- List of Norwegian television channels
- List of NRK regional services
- List of programs broadcast by Norsk rikskringkasting
- yr.no – Weather forecasting service hosted by NRK
