= Hippe (surname) =

Hippe is a surname. Notable people with the surname include:

- Ivar Hippe, currently a political consultant and former editor-in-chief of Økonomisk Rapport.
- Michelle Hippe, voice actress known for dubbing Larry Koopa since Mario Kart 8.
- Jon Mathias Hippe, younger brother of Ivar Hippe and current leader of Fafo.
- Johannes Hippe, he is the son of Jon Hippe and best known for his handball activities.
