= Mektig og avmektig =

Book by Ivar Hippe

- First edition cover
- Author: Ivar Hippe
- Language: Norwegian
- Genre: Biography
- Publisher: Genesis Publishers
- Publication date: May 7, 2003
- Publication place: Norway
- Pages: 192 pp.
- ISBN: 82-476-0266-0

Mektig og avmektig: Tore Tønne, media og maktspillet bak kulissene (English: Powerful and powerless: Tore Tønne, media and power play behind the scenes) is a biographic non-fiction written by Norwegian journalist Ivar Hippe. The book is about Tore Tønne's last days and ends with his suicide.

== Background ==
Ivar Hippe interviewed 60 people linked to the Tore Tønne-case, which included key lawyers in the BA-HR and leading investigators at Økokrim. However, he was not able to set up an interview with Kjell Inge Røkke. In an interview, Hippe asserted that the main purpose of the book was to allow all key players to tell their version of the story, and not judge on specific group. According to Hippe, one of the main themes in his book is, that the modern media are going to extremes to get their stories.

== Publication ==
The book was released on May 7, 2003. However, on May 6, Dagsrevyen broadcast a news montage on the book, which according to Hippe was produced with a deliberately negative bias towards him and his book. The montage included an interview with Kjell Inge Røkke, who had since the start been a vocal critic of Hippe and his book. Hippe considered the montage one-sided, since no supporters of the book were invited, but instead one notable critic. The news anchor of the montage was Jon Gelius. In the interview, Røkke said the following:

Hippe has, as many others, the opportunity to make money, and I see that Hippe—as humble as he is—wrote a book that promptly after the incident, which says more about Hippe than of the case, so... you should respect Tore Tønne and his family. But I see that Hippe has his own interpretation of what respect is.

— Kjell Inge Røkke, Dagsrevyen montage broadcast on May 6

Dagsrevyen-leader Annette Groth said that the montage was fair and without bias, stating that Røkke did not attack the book but rather the timing of its release.

== Reception ==
The book received mostly good reviews by the Norwegian media. Per Anders Madsen, reviewing for Aftenposten, wrote positively about the book, saying; "Straightforward analysis of events and loose ends in the Tønne-case, the author wisely refrains from claiming that he has one final answer". The reviewer in Dagbladet, Erling Borgen, called the book "fascinating", further stating that it gave a "glimpse into an environment remote to ordinary people".
