= Erik Nord =

Norwegian politician

Erik Gunnar Nord (11 September 1918 – 19 January 2014) was a Norwegian jurist, civil servant, foreign policy researcher and politician for the Socialist Left Party.

== Early life and career ==
Nord grew up in Kolbotn, and was active in the labour movement from a young age. He took his secondary education at the Oslo Cathedral School. During the occupation of Norway by Nazi Germany, he was arrested by the Nazi authorities in June 1943. He was briefly imprisoned in Bredtveit concentration camp, then Berg concentration camp. In December 1943 he was transferred to Sennheim, then Buchenwald concentration camp where he remained until the camp was liberated. He took the cand.jur. degree in 1945 after the war's end.

He was employed in the Ministry of Foreign Affairs in 1947, and served in the Norwegian United Nations delegation until 1950. He was later a secretary of the Standing Committee on Foreign Affairs from 1953 to 1962, when he spent two years in the Ministry of Foreign Affairs as an assistant secretary with responsibility for the fledgling development aid project. He wrote articles on foreign affairs in the left-oppositional organ Orientering, under a pseudonym. He was a member of the Labour Party, but left after the exclusion of the left opposition in Orientering in 1961.

During the Cold War, Nord was surveilled by Norwegian Police Surveillance Agency under Asbjørn Bryhn. According to some sources he was removed as committee secretary as a result of contact with the KGB, when Halvard Lange decided to move him to the Norwegian Institute of International Affairs (NUPI). He claimed to have been replaced because he was an EEC opponent. He started in NUPI in 1964 and remained here until his retirement.

NUPI today counts Nord as one of their most profiled researchers, together with John Sanness, Johan Jørgen Holst, Martin Sæter, Daniel Heradstveit and Jan Egeland. He was also a prolific popular speaker, tallying up to 200 appearances a year, including events for the EU opposition, the United Nations Association of Norway and Nei til Atomvåpen (No to Nuclear Weapons). He died in January 2014.
