= Gelius =

Gelius is a surname. Notable people with the surname include:

- Einar Gelius (born 1959), Norwegian priest
- Jon Gelius (born 1964), Norwegian journalist, brother of Einar
- Lisa Gelius (1909–2006), German athlete
