= Namdalseid =

Namdalseid may refer to:

== Places ==
- Namdalseid (village), a village in Namsos Municipality in Trøndelag county, Norway
- Namdalseid Church, a church in Namsos Municipality in Trøndelag county, Norway
- Namdalseid Municipality, a former municipality in Trøndelag county, Norway

== Other ==
- Namdalseid IL, a sports club based in the village of Namdalseid in Namsos Municipality in Trøndelag county, Norway
