= Annette Groth (journalist) =

Norwegian journalist

Annette Groth (born 16 February 1952 in Oslo) is a Norwegian journalist working for the Norwegian Broadcasting Corporation.

She worked in Agderposten, Aftenposten and Nationen before landing a job in the Norwegian Broadcasting Corporation in 1976. She served as their correspondent in London from 1991 to 2000, before she headed the news review Dagsrevyen from 2001 to 2004. In 2007 she became their correspondent in Washington, DC. Her tenure ended in 2010. She took over as presenter of the foreign affairs special Urix together with Christian Borch.

Media offices
| Preceded by Per Øyvind Heradstveit | Norwegian Broadcasting Corporation correspondent in London; 1991–2000 | Succeeded by Øystein Heggen |
| Preceded by Viggo Johansen | Editor of Dagsrevyen; 2001–2004 | Succeeded by Grethe Gynnild Johnsen |
| Preceded by Jan Espen Kruse | Norwegian Broadcasting Corporation correspondent in Washington, DC; 2007–2010 | Succeeded by Anders Tvegård |
