= Jon Hippe =

Norwegian politician (born 1959)

Leader of A-pressen
- In office 17 June 2010 – 2011
- Preceded by: Erik Nord
- Succeeded by: Roar Flaathen

Chairman of the Financial Crisis Committee

Personal details
- Born: Jon Mathias Hippe; 26 September 1959 (age 67) Oslo, Norway
- Party: Labour Party
- Other political affiliations: Socialist Left (former)
- Education: University of Oslo; University of Bergen
- Profession: Political science

Jon Mathias Hippe (26 September 1959) is a Norwegian researcher, politician and presenter. He received national media attention when he was made General Manager of the Fafo foundation. He continues to hold that position, however, in 2010 he was elected leader of A-pressen. He is the younger brother of Ivar Hippe, a political consultant and former editor-in-chief of Økonomisk Rapport.

== Political activities ==
Hippe was born in Oslo and raised up in Tonsenhagen. He studied at the University of Oslo and Bergen, he earned the cand.polit. degree in political science and economics as well as a Ph.D. on the relationship between public and private welfare arrangements. In the 1979 local elections, he was listed on the Socialist Left municipal candidate list for Oslo. Four years later, he gathered members of the Socialist Left to present them a report entitled, Norway de luxe — a report on income, wealth and consumption among the richest in Norway. He wrote this report with fellow Socialist Left member, Kåre Hagen. The following year, he wrote another report with Hagen, entitled; Oslo to rich and poor. In the report they asserted that the only way to reduce the gap between rich and poor in Norway was with higher taxes.

Later in 1985, he landed a job in the Fafo Foundation. He left this position in Fafo in 1995, and instead got a job as director of public affairs at UNI Storebrand. He left that position in 2001 for a job in Telenor as Executive Vice President. Later, he earned the position of Director of Communication in Telenor before quitting and becoming leader of the Fafo Foundation in 2004. In mid-2009, Hippe was hand-picked by finance minister Kristin Halvorsen to become the leader of the Financial Crisis Committee. He was elected the leader of A-pressen in 2010 by members of the committee.

== Personal life ==
Jon Hippe is the younger brother of Ivar Hippe, the former editor-in-chief of Økonomisk Rapport. Hanne Bjurstrøm, Minister of Labour, have called him her "best friend", having been his best man in his wedding in 1984 and he being hers in 2002. He is the son of police officer Ola Hippe. Handball player Johannes Hippe is his son.
