= Nina Owing =

Norwegian news anchor

Nina Owing (born 1958) is a Norwegian news anchor.

She was hired by the Norwegian Broadcasting Corporation and presented their main newscast, Dagsnytt. In 1992 she was hired as head journalist of the television newscast, Dagsrevyen. In 1994 she became presenter of the Saturday edition which includes feature journalism, Lørdagsrevyen, and in 1995 she became a regular news anchor of Dagsrevyen. She also presented political debate shows; from 2005 to 2007 Standpunkt—and the Norwegian Broadcasting Corporation's election night coverage.
