= Atle Bjurstrøm =

Norwegian news anchor

Atle Bjurstrøm (born 28 November 1975 in Oslo, Norway) is a Norwegian news anchor.

He was hired in the Norwegian Broadcasting Corporation in 1998 and became news anchor of Norway's main television newscast, Dagsrevyen in 2003. Since 2007 he has also presented political debate shows; he debuted ahead of the Norwegian local elections, 2007 when presenting several head-to-head debates between party leaders. He also branched out to entertainment programs such as Sommeråpent in 2014.
