= Gjerdåker =

Gjerdåker is a surname. Notable people with the surname include:

- Johannes Gjerdåker (1936–2020), Norwegian local historian, poet, translator, non-fiction writer, and publisher
- Svein Gjerdåker (born 1963), Norwegian newspaper editor
