= Christian Borch =

Norwegian television presenter

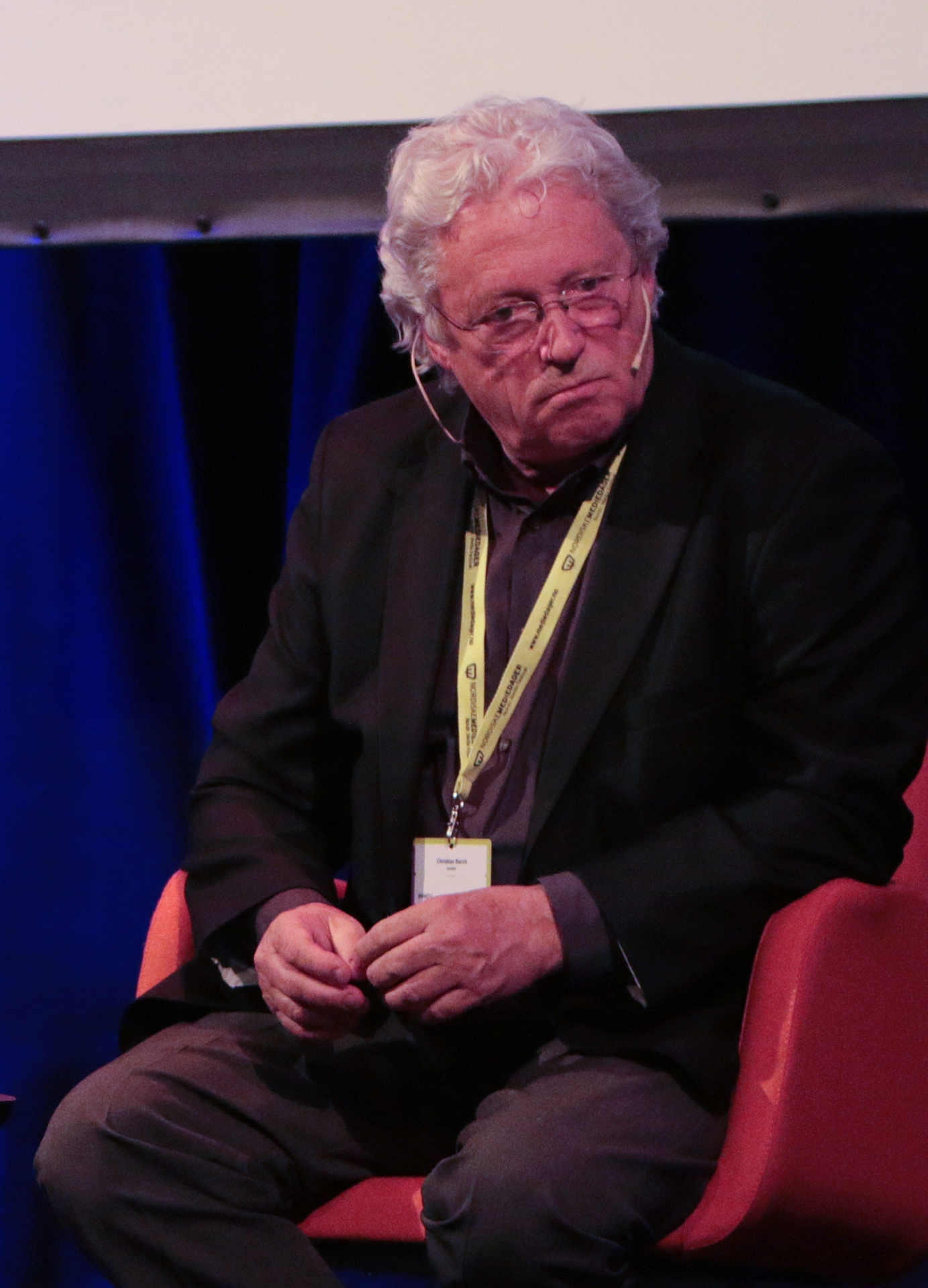
Christian Borch, 2016

Christian Borch (born 2 June 1944) is a Norwegian television presenter and news anchor.

He was born in Bergen, but grew up in Holmenkollåsen. In his younger days he worked at sea and studied law, but ended these pursuits to become a journalist in Morgenbladet. Hired in Morgenbladet in 1965, he went on to Norges Eksportråd in 1969 and the Federation of Norwegian Industries in 1970. From 1974 to 1978 he had his second spell in Morgenbladet, as news editor.

He was hired in the Norwegian Broadcasting Corporation in 1978, and in the early 2000s he served as news anchor for Dagsrevyen. In 2004 he won a Gullruten award for best news or sports anchor. In 2010 he took over as presenter of the foreign affairs special Urix together with Annette Groth.

His first wife, with whom he had two daughters, died of cancer at the age of 42. He was later married to actress Elsa Hvinden for thirteen years. He is now in a relationship with French citizen Joséphine Sconza.
