= Lyn Julius =

Babylonian journalist

- Born: United Kingdom

Academic background
- Education: French Lycée in London and the University of Sussex

Academic work
- Notable works: Uprooted: How 3000 Years of Jewish Civilization in the Arab World Vanished Overnight

Lyn Julius (Hebrew: לין יוליוס) is a Babylonian Jewish journalist, blogger, speaker, author and co-founder of Harif, a UK-based organization focused on the history, culture and expulsion of Sephardic and Mizrahi Jews from the Muslim world.

== Biography ==
Lyn Julius was born in the United Kingdom to Babylonian Jewish refugees who had fled Iraq in 1950. She was educated at the French Lycée in London and earned a degree in international relations from the University of Sussex. She spent three years living in Stavanger, Norway, where she worked for the English-language newspaper Saga Weekly and occasionally contributed to NRK News in English. She speaks six languages, including basic Norwegian.

== Journalism ==
=== Founding of Harif ===
Julius is the co-founder of Harif, a UK-based organization founded in 2005 dedicated to preserving and promoting the history, culture, and heritage of Jews from the Middle East and North Africa. It serves as a platform for raising awareness about the expulsion of Jews from Muslim countries, advocating for their rights, recognition and the mistreatment of Jews under Muslim rule. She has organized over 200 events for Harif, including talks, film screenings and book launches covering Mizrahi and Sephardic topics. She has played a key role in arranging hearings on Jewish refugees in the UK Parliament at Westminster and has been a regular speaker at the annual international education conference Limmud.

=== Journalism and blog ===
Julius is a journalist and runs a daily blog, Point of No Return, which focuses on Jews from Muslim lands. She has written articles for major outlets including The Guardian, Standpoint, Haaretz, Jerusalem Post, Jewish Chronicle, Huffington Post, JNS and The Times of Israel.

== Works on Mizrahi and Sephardic Jewry ==
Lyn Julius has written about the ethnic cleansing and mistreatment of Jews from Muslim countries. Her work covers the mass displacement of nearly a million Jews from Arab and Muslim lands in the 20th century, focusing on the persecution, confiscation of property, loss of citizenship, and the erasure of centuries-old communities. By focusing on the history of Jews in the Arab world, she seeks to bring attention to this often-overlooked chapter of Jewish and Middle Eastern history and to ensure that the experiences of the refugees from these regions are recognized. She challenges the myth that Jews lived in peaceful coexistence with their Arab neighbors and shows that Jewish safety was precarious, often depending on the disposition of the ruler at the time, which could shift drastically from one generation to the next. Julius cites the millennia-long Jewish presence in the Middle East and North Africa as a challenge to the modern depiction of Zionism as a colonialist movement, which are central to liberal and anti-Zionist discourse, through arguing that Jews are indigenous to the region. She views the Arab conquest as colonialism, that subjugated native peoples and seizing their land and resources.

== Uprooted: How 3000 Years of Jewish Civilization in the Arab World Vanished Overnight ==
Julius is the author of Uprooted: How 3,000 Years of Jewish Civilization in the Arab World Vanished Overnight, an examination of the expulsion of nearly a million Jews from Muslim countries during the 20th century. The book covers topics such as the Jewish life under Islamic rule, the impact of Arab nationalism, antisemitism in the Islamic world and the consequences of Nazi influence in the Middle East. It has been translated into Norwegian, Portuguese, and Arabic, with a Hebrew version in progress.

== Published works ==
- Julius, Lyn (2018). Uprooted: how 3,000 years of Jewish civilisation in the Arab world vanished overnight. London : Portland, OR: Vallentine Mitchell. ISBN 9781910383643.
