= Viggo Johansen (journalist) =

Norwegian television presenter

Correspondent of the Norwegian Broadcasting Corporation in Stockholm
- In office 1990–1992 Serving with Ivar Hippe.
- Preceded by: Ingvild Bryn
- Succeeded by: Kjell Pihlstrøm

Personal details
- Born: 19 August 1949 (age 77) Oslo, Norway
- Education: University of Oslo
- Occupation: Journalist

Viggo Johansen (born 19 August 1949) is a Norwegian television presenter.

He has been a newspaper journalist in Dagbladet and worked for TV 2, but is best known from the Norwegian Broadcasting Corporation.

He served as their correspondent in Brussels from 1993 to 1997, before he was appointed as magazine editor in 1998, news editor (among others of Dagsrevyen) in 1999 and finance editor in 2001. From 2002 to 2009 he presented his own programme, Redaksjon 1. He continued with his own Saturday night show, Viggo på lørdag.

In the 1960s and 1970s he played football for Vålerengen. His son Victor Johansen became a professional footballer.

Media offices
Preceded by	Norwegian Broadcasting Corporation correspondent in Brussels; 1993–1997	Succeeded by
Preceded by Hans-Wilhelm Steinfeld	Editor of Dagsrevyen; 1999–2001	Succeeded by Annette Groth
