= Ingvild Bryn =

Norwegian journalist

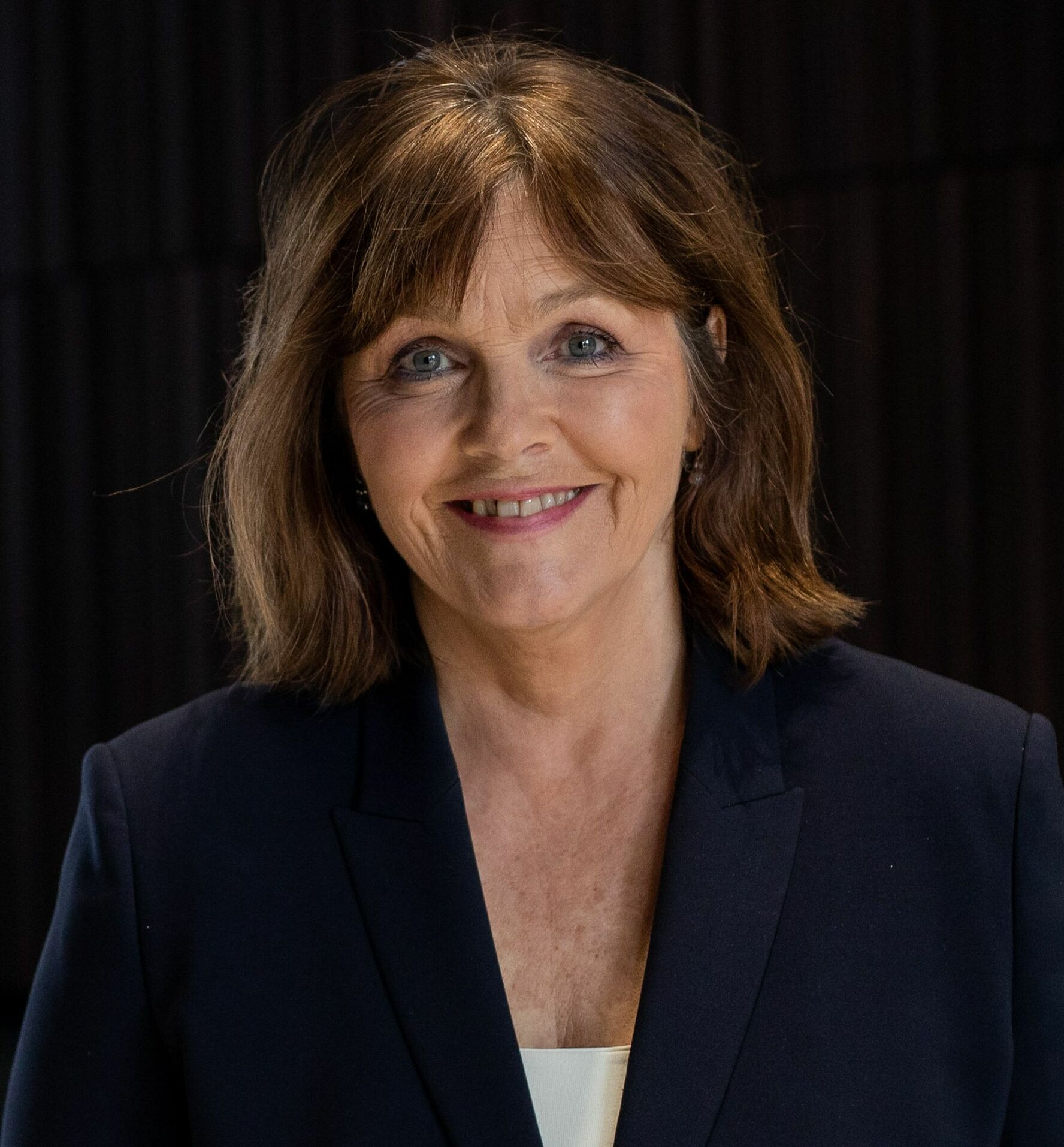
- Bryn in 2022

Correspondent of the Norwegian Broadcasting Corporation in Stockholm
- In office 1990–1992
- Preceded by: Erika Jahr.
- Succeeded by: Viggo Johansen and Ivar Hippe

Personal details
- Born: 18 March 1961 (age 65) Voss Municipality, Hordaland, Norway
- Spouse: Svein Gjerdåker
- Children: 2
- Relatives: Herborg Bryn (sister)
- Education: University of Oslo
- Occupation: Journalist and television presenter
- Known for: News anchor for Dagsrevyen, presenting Eurovision Song Contest 1996

Ingvild Bryn (born 18 March 1961) is a Norwegian journalist. She is a news anchor for the evening news Dagsrevyen, aired on the Norwegian Broadcasting Corporation.

== Biography ==
She started as a news anchor in 1990, was then a correspondent in Washington, D.C. from 1996 to 1999 before returning to her post. She was, together with Morten Harket, the official presenter of the Eurovision Song Contest 1996.

She has education from the Volda University College and the University of Oslo. She is a proponent of Nynorsk and received the Nynorsk User of the Year award in 2012.

She hails from Voss Municipality. Her sister Herborg Bryn is a Norwegian Broadcasting Corporation journalist. She is married to Svein Gjerdåker, and they have two adopted children.

== See also ==
- List of Eurovision Song Contest presenters

Preceded by (Republic of Ireland) Mary Kennedy	Eurovision Song Contest presenter (with Morten Harket); 1996	Succeeded by (Republic of Ireland) Ronan Keating & Carrie Crowley
