= Vålerenga Church =

- Vålerenga kirke
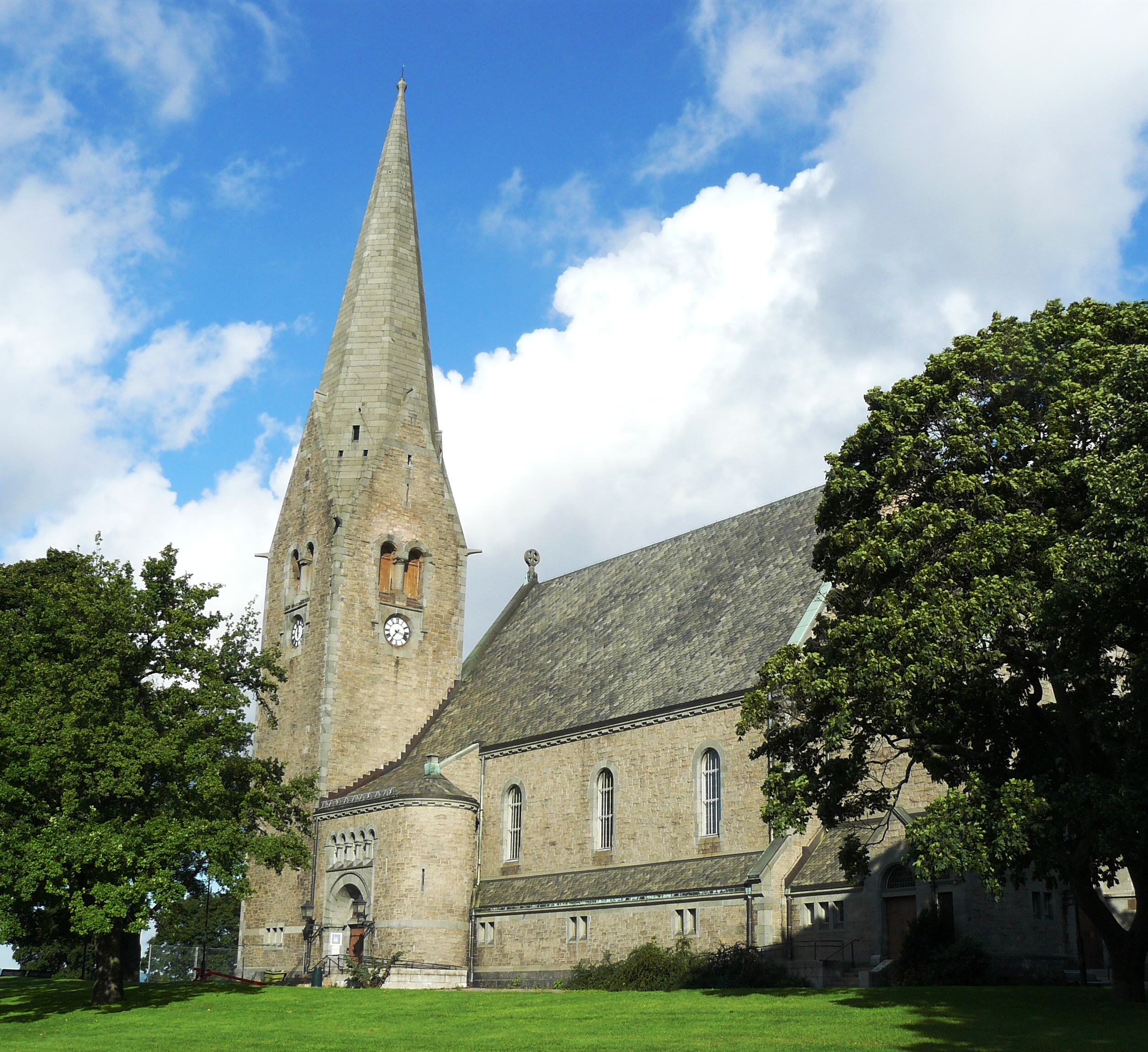

- Location within Oslo Location within Norway
- 59°54′26″N 10°47′16″E
- Location: Hjaltlandsgt 3, Vålerenga, Oslo,
- Country: Norway
- Denomination: Church of Norway
- Churchmanship: Evangelical Lutheran
- Website: kirken.no/valerenga

History
- Status: Parish church
- Consecrated: October 10, 1902

Architecture
- Functional status: Active
- Architect(s): Heinrich Jürgensen; Holger Sinding-Larsen; Asbjørn Stein (Reconstruction 1984)

Specifications
- Materials: Stone

Administration
- Diocese: Diocese of Oslo
- Parish: Vålerenga

Vålerenga Church (Norwegian: Vålerenga kirke) is a church located in Oslo, Norway. Vålerenga church stands in the middle of Vålerenga park in the neighborhood of Vålerenga. The church belongs to the parish of Vålerenga of the Oslo arch-deanery within the Diocese of Oslo of the Church of Norway.

== History ==
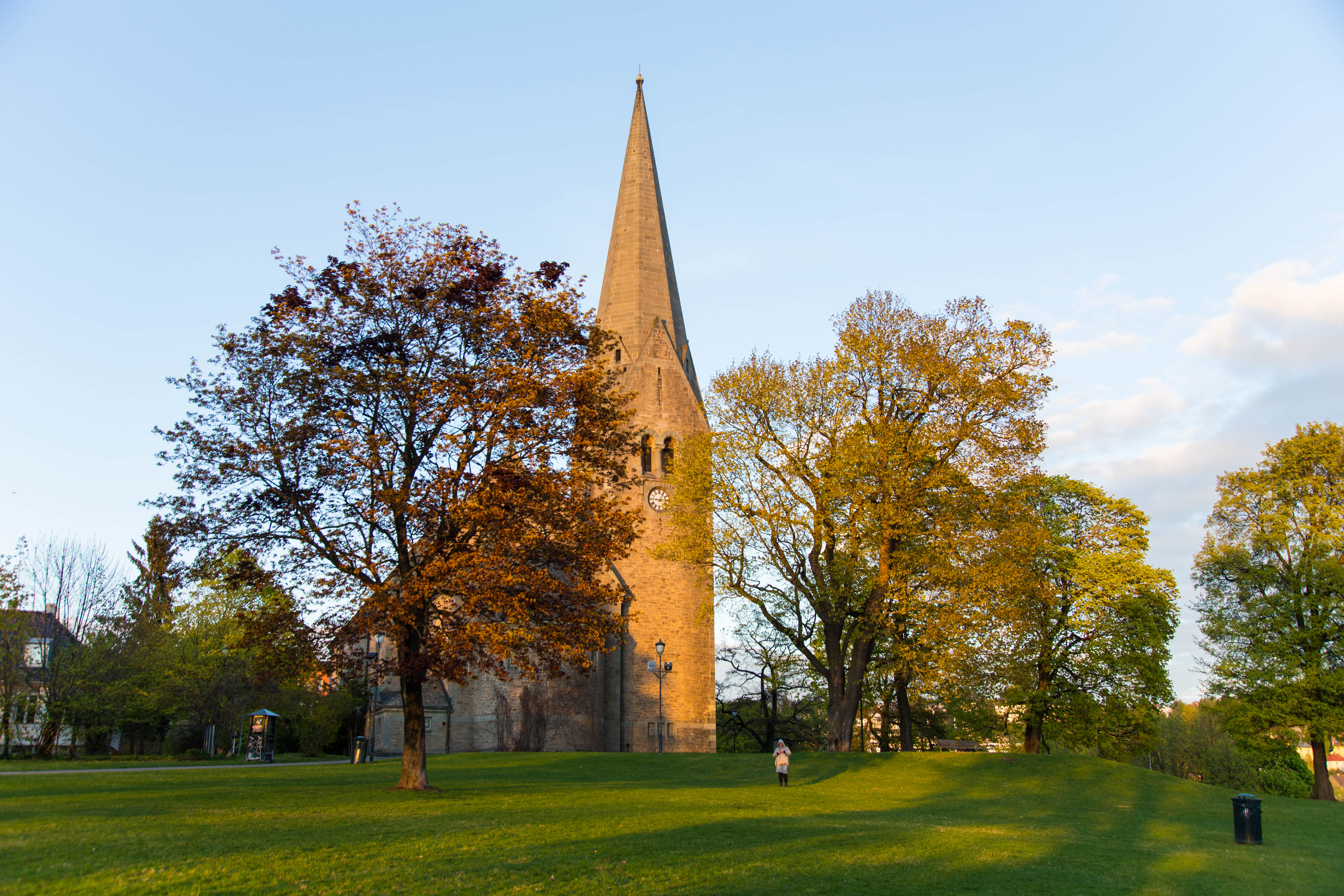
Vålerenga Church

The church was built in late 19th century, and was consecrated in 1902. The architects were Heinrich Jürgensen and Holger Sinding-Larsen. The church is built in the Neo-Gothic and National Romantic styles, like many of the Norwegian churches built during this period of time. Vålerenga church is special architecturally because of its asymmetrically placed church tower, one of Norway's first of its kind.

In 1979, the church burned to the ground during construction work and the building was almost totally destroyed. Only the outer walls, made of stone, were left standing. Frescoes and stained glass windows made by Emanuel Vigeland were lost. The church was rebuilt, and reconsecrated in 1984. New pieces of art were made by the artist Håkon Bleken together with a fresco which had been designed by Emanuel Vigeland. Former priests have included Einar Gelius.

== In popular culture ==
The fire at the church is the topic of a song named Vålerenga Kjerke, composed by Trond Ingebretsen and recorded by his band Bjølsen Valsemølle. This song is sung by the supporters of the sports club Vålerenga IF at matches.

== Other sources ==
- Vålerenga kirke from the Norwegian (Norsk) Wikipedia. Retrieved July 5, 2005.
- "Yahoo! Travel".
