= Christine Præsttun =

Norwegian television presenter and correspondent (1971–2020)

Christine Præsttun (3 May 1971 – 8 January 2020) was a Norwegian television presenter and correspondent.

She studied sociology at the University of Oslo, graduating in 2001 with a master's thesis about identity and modernity in Hong Kong. While studying she had become involved in RadiOrakel in 1993, and while doing field work in Hong Kong in 1996 she managed to become P4 Radio's correspondent.

After graduation, she was hired in the Norwegian Broadcasting Corporation and from 2002 to 2005 she was the inaugural presenter of the debate show Standpunkt. She later presented the radio programmes Dagsnytt 18, Ukeslutt and Søndagsavisa. Together with her husband Sverre Tom Radøy she was the Norwegian Broadcasting Corporation correspondent in Africa, stationed in Kenya, from 2014 to 2018.

She resided at Nesøya. She died from breast cancer on 8 January 2020, at the age of 48.

Media offices
Preceded by Lars Sigurd Sunnanå	Norwegian Broadcasting Corporation correspondent in Africa; 2014–2018 (with Sverre Tom Radøy	Succeeded by Ida Dahlback
