= Anders Tvegård =

Norwegian journalist

Anders Tvegård (born August 6, 1975, in Porsgrunn) is a Norwegian journalist. He was US-correspondent for the Norwegian Broadcasting Corporation (NRK) based in Washington, D.C., from 2010 to 2014. Tvegård previously worked at the foreign news desk and as news anchor on the same channel.

He was educated at Volda University College (1996–98), Darlington College of Technology (1995–96) and the University of Oslo. He has been working for NRK since 1998.

Tvegård has been reporting from conflict zones and disaster areas like the tsunami in Thailand (2004), the Israeli–Lebanese war (2006), the war on Gaza (2008), the last days of the civil war in Sri Lanka (2009), Afghanistan (2009) and the tsunami in Japan (2011)

== Sourced ==
- US policy on Syria

Media offices
Preceded by Annette Groth	NRK correspondent in Washington, DC; 2010–2014	Succeeded by Tove Bjørgaas
