= Per Øyvind Heradstveit =

Norwegian television journalist

- Born: 26 May 1932; Skjold
- Died: 11 May 2004 (aged 71)
- Occupation: Journalist
- Employer: Norwegian Broadcasting Corporation

Per Øyvind Heradstveit (26 May 1932 – 11 May 2004) was a Norwegian television journalist and non-fiction writer.

== Personal life ==
Heradstveit was born on 26 May 1932 in Skjold in Ryfylke and grew up in Hardanger. He was a son of farmer Arne A. Heradstveit and Ingrid Nedrebø, and was a brother of Daniel Heradstveit. He married Regina Urszula Włodarek in 1956.

== Career ==
Heradstveit worked for the Norwegian Broadcasting Corporation (NRK) from 1956, and for the television division from 1961. He was among the best known television personalities in Norway, hosting the daily news review Dagsrevyen and a number of television debates. Among his books were Hemmelige tjenester (1973), on intelligence and espionage, and Einar Gerhardsen og hans menn (1981), on power struggles within the Norwegian Labour Party.
