= Latin America Solidarity Organisation in Norway =

The Latin America Solidarity Organisation in Norway (Norwegian: Latin-Amerikagruppene i Norge (LAG)) is a Norwegian organization involved in projects involving Latin America. The organization was founded under the name Latin America Groups in Oslo (Norwegian: Latin-Amerikagruppene i Oslo) by Ivar Hippe, Nili Deloya and Mette Hjelmark.
