= Johannes Hippe =

Norwegian handball player (born 1990)

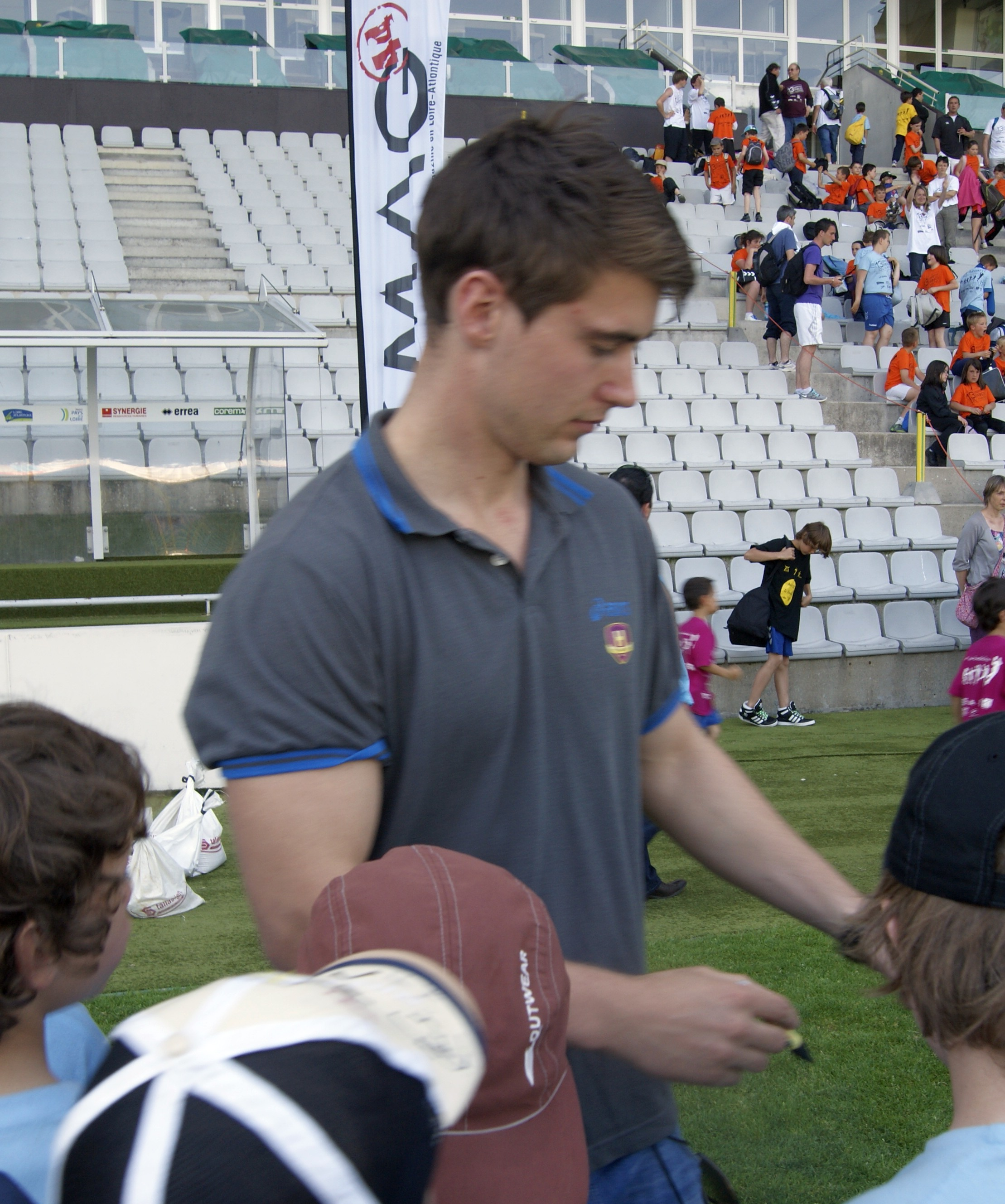
- Johannes Hippe in 2012

Personal information
- Full name: Erik Johannes Hippe
- Born: 24 July 1990 (age 36) Oslo, Norway ( Norway)
- Height: 1.93 m (6 ft 4 in)

Sport
- Sport: Handball
- Position: Left Back
- Current club: Lugi HF
- Number: 19

Senior clubs
- Years: Team
- 1996–2008: Nordstrand IF
- 2008–2011: BSK/NIF
- 2011–2012: HBC Nantes
- 2012–2014: Lugi HF
- 2014–2015: BSK/NIF
- 2015–2019: Drammen HK
- 2019–2020: Nordstrand IF
National team
Years	Team	Apps	(Gls)
2010–2015	Norway	40	(71)

Johannes Hippe (born 24 July 1990) is a former Norwegian handball player. He played left and centre back.

After two and a half season on Norway's top level and weeks of rumoring, Johannes officially signed for the French club HBC Nantes on 7 December 2011. In October 2012, Hippe signed with Swedish club Lugi HF, where he scored 12 goals in his debut. After two years in Sweden he left Lugi for studies in Oslo. After playing one year for BSK/NIF he began playing for Drammen HK 2015. He stayed in Drammen until 2019. 2019 he won the Norse championship, Hes last year he played for his motherclub Nordstrans IF i Oslo.

He is the son of Jon Hippe, and related to Ivar Hippe.
