= Einar Gelius =

Norwegian priest (born 1959)

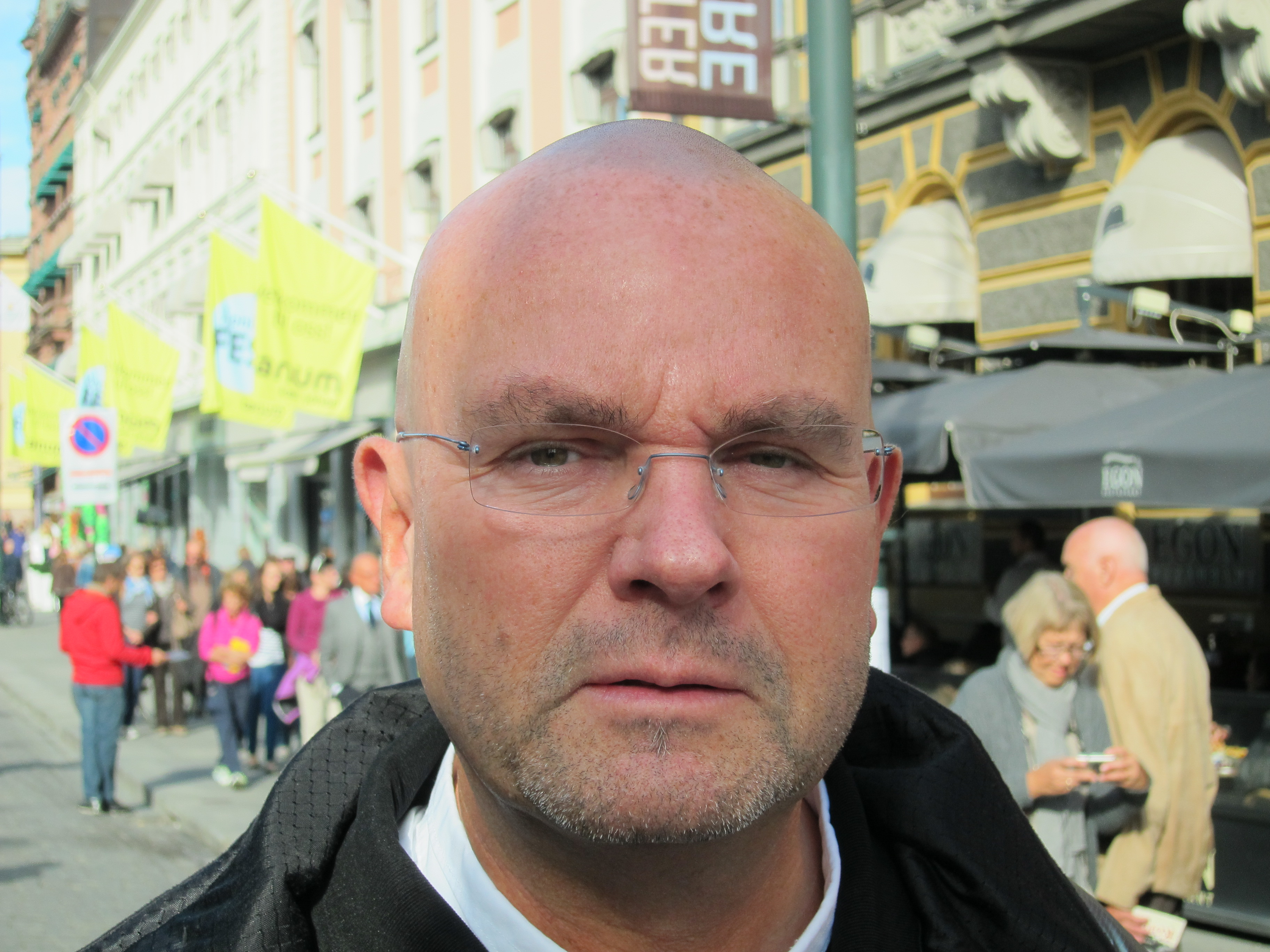
- Einar Gelius (2011)
- Born: 15 May 1959 (age 67); Arendal, Norway
- Education: University of Oslo (1985)
- Occupations: Priest, Politician, Radio personality, Author
- Office: State Secretary in the Ministry of Local Government
- Political party: Labour Party (Norway)
- Relatives: Jon Gelius (brother)

Einar Gelius (born 15 May 1959 in Arendal) is a Norwegian priest who has also been involved in politics for the Norwegian Labour Party.

He is known as the priest of Vålerenga parish, more specifically Vålerenga church. He previously held the same position at Ørland Church, Beitstad Church and Namdalseid Church. He graduated from the University of Oslo in 1985, and was ordained in 1986.

During the first cabinet Stoltenberg, Gelius was appointed State Secretary in the Ministry of Local Government.

Gelius is also a radio personality, author, and runs a communications bureau called Gelius Kommunikasjon.

He is the brother of news anchor Jon Gelius.

== Controversy ==
In September 2009, a commercial for Vålerenga's match against FC Lyn featured Gelius holding a mock funeral for the near bankrupt Lyn team, whose survival is uncertain. Although the stunt was meant to be humorous, Lyn and its supporters found the commercial macabre, and the Oslo bishop Ole Christian Kvarme criticized what he considered inappropriate use of the funeral rituals.

In 2010 Gelius published the book Sex i bibelen (Sex in the Bible) which was heavily criticised by Christians. There have been a number of other controversies also related to Gelius's job performance. Twice, and as early as 1999 Gelius was summoned to former Oslo bishop Gunnar Stålsett, and on both occasions he was asked to consider terminating his position. The reason was complaints about his behavior and his cooperation with the congregation. On November 16, 2010 it was made public that his current bishop has initiated proceedings to strip Gelius of his position. On the 24. of November he decided to leave his position after a meeting with the bishop of Oslo, Ole Christian Kvarme.
