= Anders Magnus =

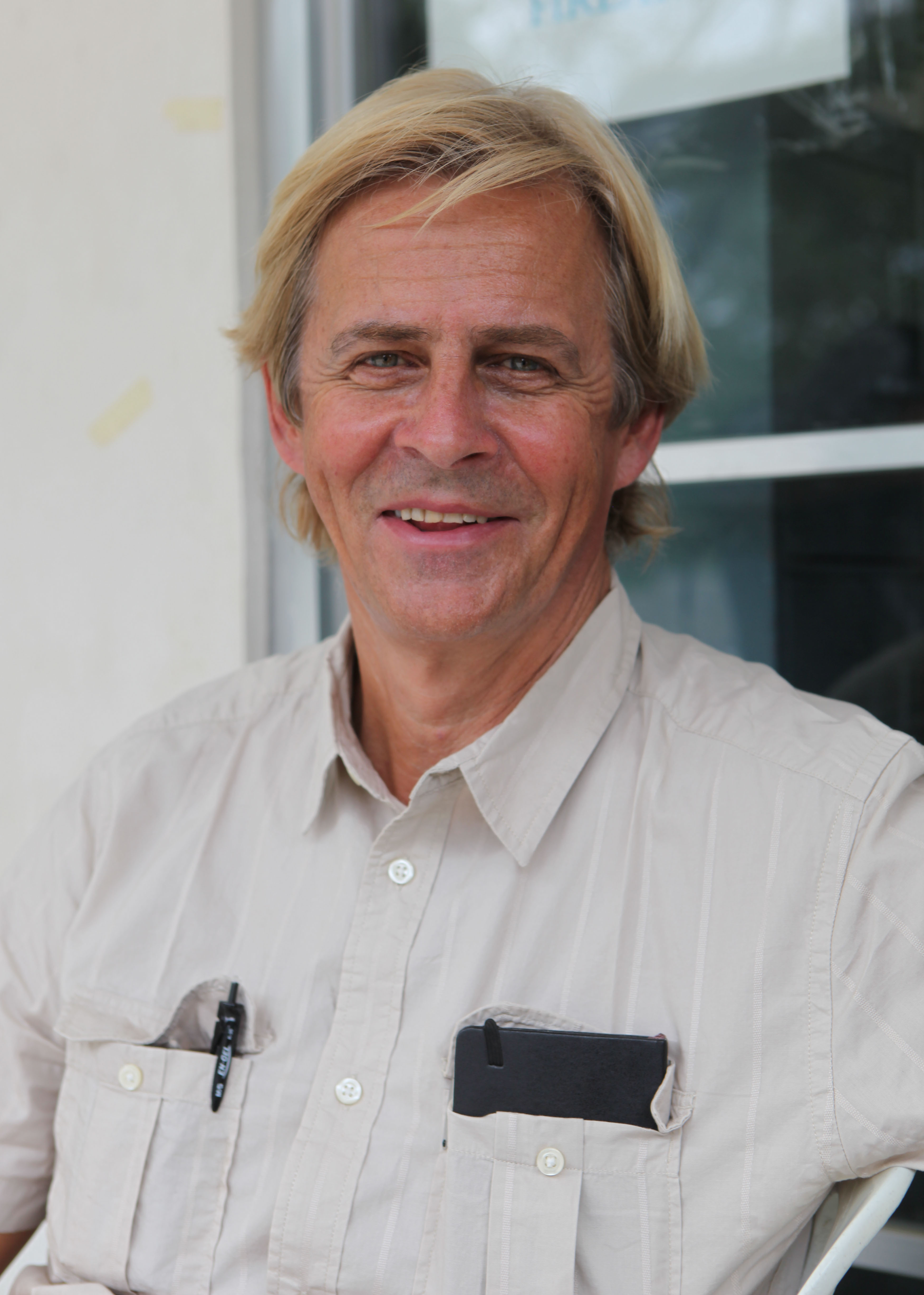
Anders Magnus, 2011.

Anders Magnus (born 10 April 1952) is a Norwegian journalist, author and television reporter.

Magnus was born in Oslo and took the cand.mag. degree in 1976. He was hired in the Norwegian Broadcasting Corporation (NRK) in 1978, and after tenures in Bergens Tidende from 1982 to 1992 and TV 2 from 1992 to 1998 he returned to NRK in 1998. He served as the NRK correspondent covering all of Africa from 1998 to 2002, and later as correspondent covering Asia from 2010 to 2014.

He has authored several books, including Min afrikanske reise (My African journey; 2004) about his time in Africa.

Media offices
Preceded by Anne Efskin	NRK correspondent in Africa; 1998–2002	Succeeded by Tomm Kristiansen
Preceded by Ole Torp	NRK correspondent in Asia; 2010–2014	Succeeded by Peter Svaar
Preceded by Gro Holm	NRK correspondent in the United States; 2017–2021	Succeeded by Tove Bjørgaas
