= Tove Bjørgaas =

Norwegian television correspondent

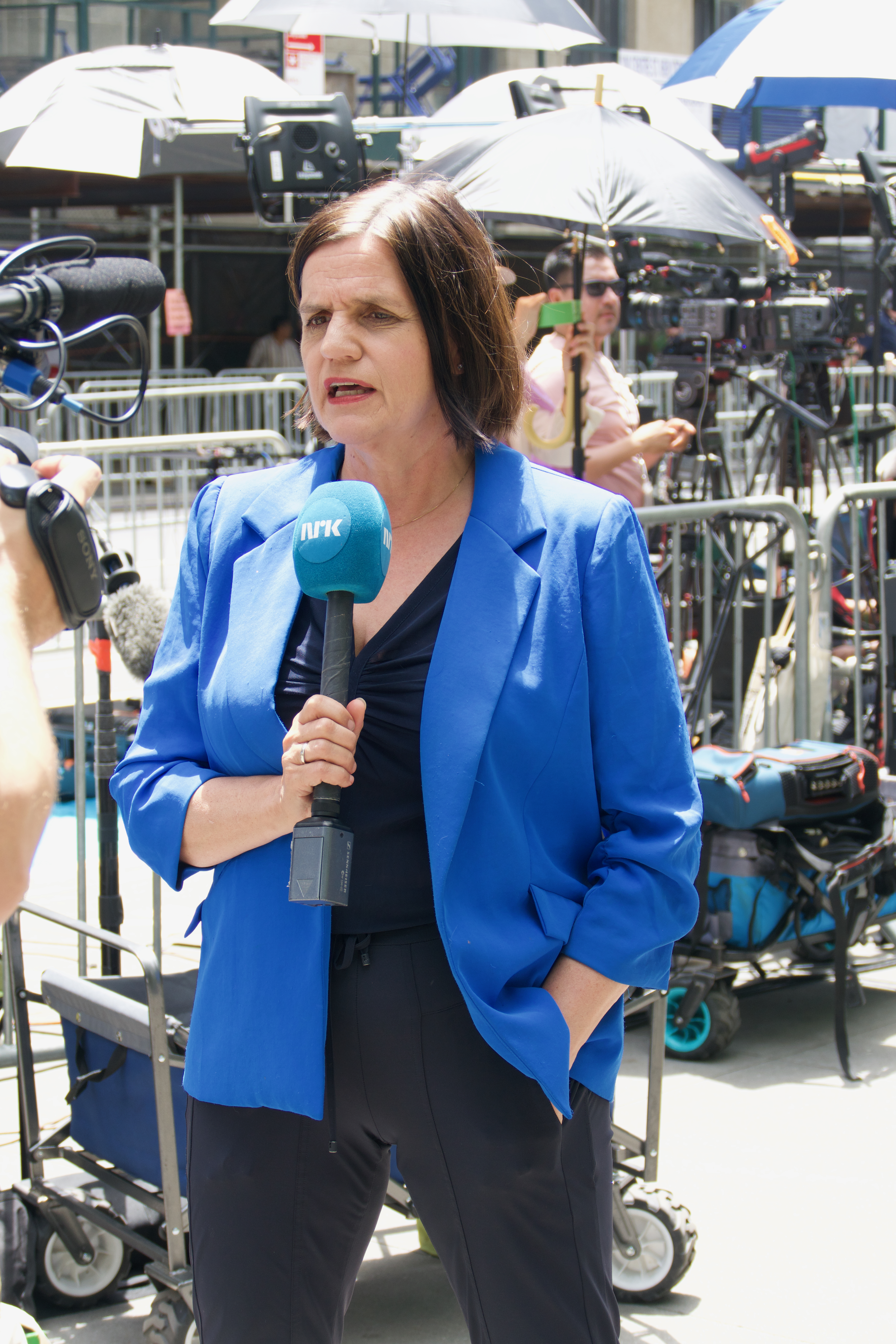
- Tove Bjørgaas at the Manhattan Criminal Courthouse in 2024, reporting about the prosecution of Donald Trump in New York.
- Born: July 30, 1972 (age 53); Svolvær, Norway
- Education: Oslo University College, Johns Hopkins University
- Occupation: Television Correspondent
- Years active: 1996–present
- Employer: Norwegian Broadcasting Corporation (NRK)
- Notable work: Forandring og frykt: Barack Obamas USA

Tove Bjørgaas (born 30 July 1972) is a Norwegian television correspondent.

Bjørgaas was born in Svolvær. She took the journalist education at Oslo University College and an economics degree at Johns Hopkins University. She was hired in the Norwegian Broadcasting Corporation (NRK) in 1996. Bjørgaas is best known for her two stints as NRK's correspondent in Washington, DC, from 2006 to 2010 and 2014 to 2018. She also issued a book on the Obama presidency, Forandring og frykt: Barack Obamas USA (2011). She resides in Asker.

Media offices
Preceded by Joar Hoel Larsen	NRK correspondent in Washington, DC; 2006–2010	Succeeded by Jon Gelius
Preceded by Anders Tvegård	NRK correspondent in Washington, DC; 2014–2018	Succeeded by Veronica Westhrin
Preceded by Anders Magnus	NRK correspondent in Washington, DC; 2021-	Succeeded by
