= Tidens Leksikon =

Norwegian political encyclopedia

Tidens Leksikon (The Encyclopaedia of Time) is a Norwegian political encyclopaedia, published in six volumes in 1975–1976 by Tiden Norsk Forlag, edited by Einar Gerhardsen, Odd Højdahl and John Sanness.

Like Arbeidernes Leksikon, the encyclopaedia was a product of the labour movement, but with a rather different political standpoint. Published by a Labour Party and LO-owned publishing house. Tidens Leksikon appeared to be a project firmly rooted in social democracy.

The encyclopedia contains 3,000 pages, featuring 46,000 articles and 3,000 images.

The work of the encyclopedia started in November 1973. And The first volume was published in 1975

== List of volumes ==
This is a list of the six volumes of the encyclopedia Tidens Leksikon.

- Tidens leksikon. 1 : A-bå. Oslo: Tiden. 1975.
- Tidens leksikon. 2 : C-ft. Oslo: Tiden. 1975.
- Tidens leksikon. 3 : fu-ka. Oslo: Tiden. 1975.
- Tidens leksikon. 4 : kc-ni. Oslo: Tiden. 1975.
- Tidens leksikon. 5 : nj-so. Oslo: Tiden. 1976.
- Tidens leksikon. 6 : sp-å Atlas. Oslo: Tiden. 1976.
