= Dag og Tid =

National weekly newspaper in Norway

- Type: Weekly newspaper
- Format: Tabloid
- Owner(s): Riksfondet for nynorsk presse (11.4%); Sveinung Lindaas (2.69%); Svein Gjerdåker (2.28%); Øystein Nordang (2.24%); Det norske samlaget (2.17%); Noregs Mållag (2.03%); Guri Vesaas (1.17%); Various (68.82%)
- Editor: Svein Gjerdåker
- Founded: 1962
- Political alignment: Independent
- Headquarters: Oslo, Norway
- Circulation: 15,093
- Website: www.dagogtid.no

Dag og Tid (English: Day and Time) is a national weekly newspaper in Norway that uses the Nynorsk standard of the Norwegian language.

Dag og Tid was founded in 1962. Contrary to most other Norwegian newspapers, its circulation has recently increased significantly, nearly doubling over the last two decades.

== History and profile ==
Dag og Tid was founded in 1962. The paper is published weekly. Its headquarters is located in Oslo.

Dag og Tid is politically independent, but editorially radical. It focuses on culture and politics. It is owned by various persons and groups. The current editor is Svein Gjerdåker.

In the 2010s, Dag og Tid was one of few Norwegian print newspapers with a substantial increase of readers. Its circulation in 2015 was 10,948, up from 7,228 copies in 2008.

== Circulation ==
Numbers from the Norwegian Media Businesses' Association, Mediebedriftenes Landsforening.

Circulation 1993 - 2024
* 1993: 6263
- 1994: 5886
- 1995: 6011
- 1996: 6375
- 1997: 6728
- 1998: 6766
- 1999: 6319
- 2000: 6318
- 2001: 6671
- 2002: 6519
- 2003: 6982
- 2004: 7029
- 2005: 7054
- 2006: 7206
- 2007: 7228
- 2008: 7233
- 2009: 7531
- 2010: 8338
- 2011: 8729
- 2012: 9132
- 2013: 9582
- 2014: 10778
- 2015: 10948
- 2016: 11211
- 2017: 11271
- 2018: 11720
- 2019: 12053
- 2020: 12904
- 2021: 13425
- 2022: 13758
- 2023: 14663
- 2024: 15093

== See also ==
- Jon Hustad
- Agnes Ravatn
- Eskil Skjeldal
