= Ingerid Stenvold =

Norwegian journalist and cross-country skier

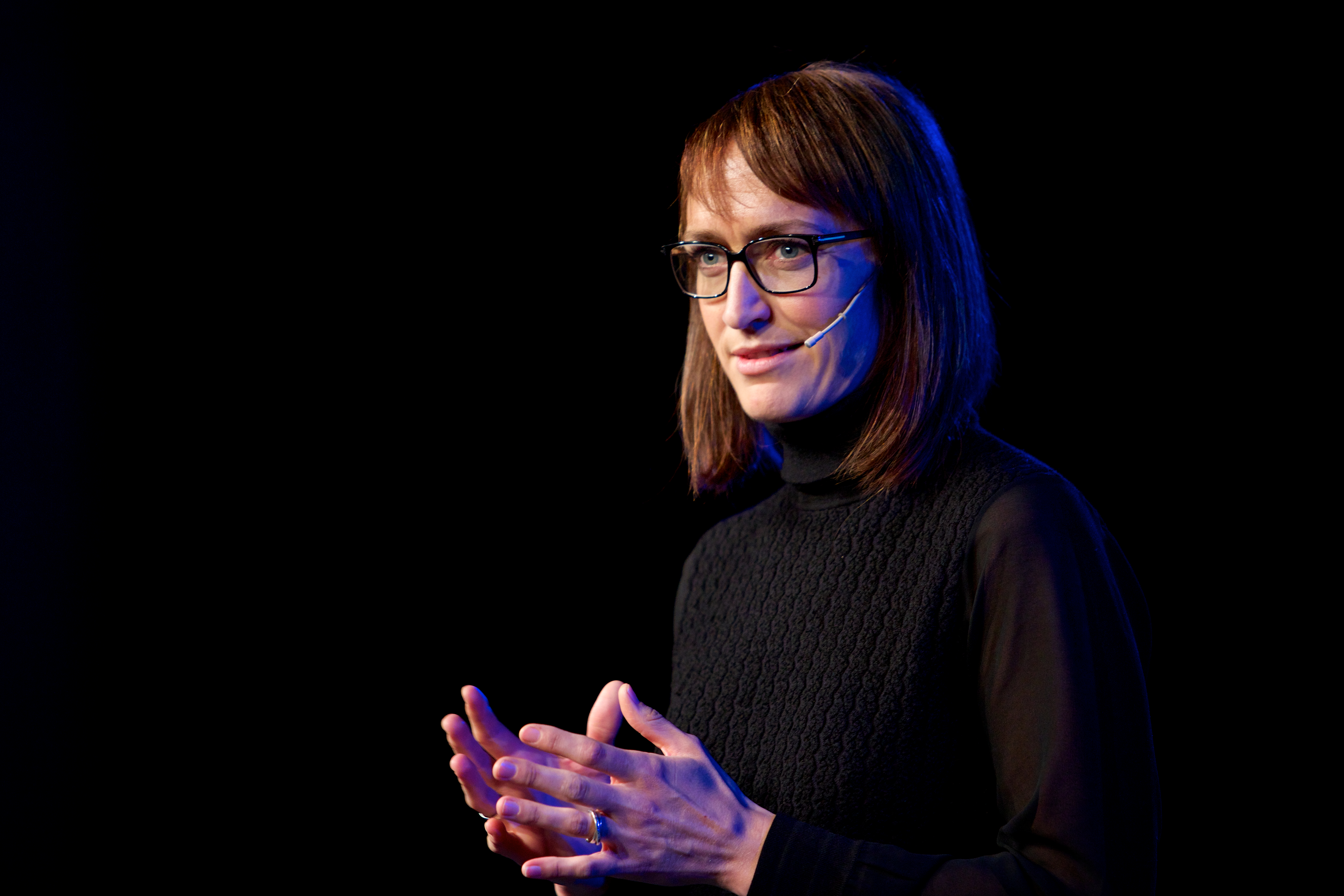
- Stenvold in 2015.
- Born: 20 June 1977 (age 48); Finnfjordbotn, Troms, Norway
- Occupation: Television presenter
- Children: 2

Ingerid Stenvold (born 20 June 1977) is a Norwegian television presenter and former cross-country skier. Since 2010, she has been working as a newscaster for the main news program Dagsrevyen.

== Career ==
Stenvold grew up in Finnfjordbotn in Troms. In her youth, she took part in cross-country skiing races. In 1993, she was presented by the Norwegian television station Norsk rikskringkasting (NRK) in an eight-minute report as a future hope in cross-country skiing. At the Norwegian youth championship she won the gold medal in the individual in 1994 and in the relay in 1995. After a back injury in the 1998/99 season, she had to end her sports career.

In 2001, she finished her studies in journalism and began her career at the NRK in Tromsø. Four years later, she became a sports journalist and reported on the 2008 Summer Olympics in Beijing. She then took over the moderation of the music magazine Lydverket for a year. In Autumn 2009, she became the presenter of the morning news Morgennytt of NRK. Since 2010, she has moderated the television broadcaster's main news Dagsrevyen. She was allowed to speak in her local dialect from Målselv Municipality. For the use of her dialect, she was awarded the Kringkasting Prize in 2007.

== Personal life ==
Stenvold is married and has two children.
