= Johan Jørgen Holst =

Norwegian politician (1937–1994)

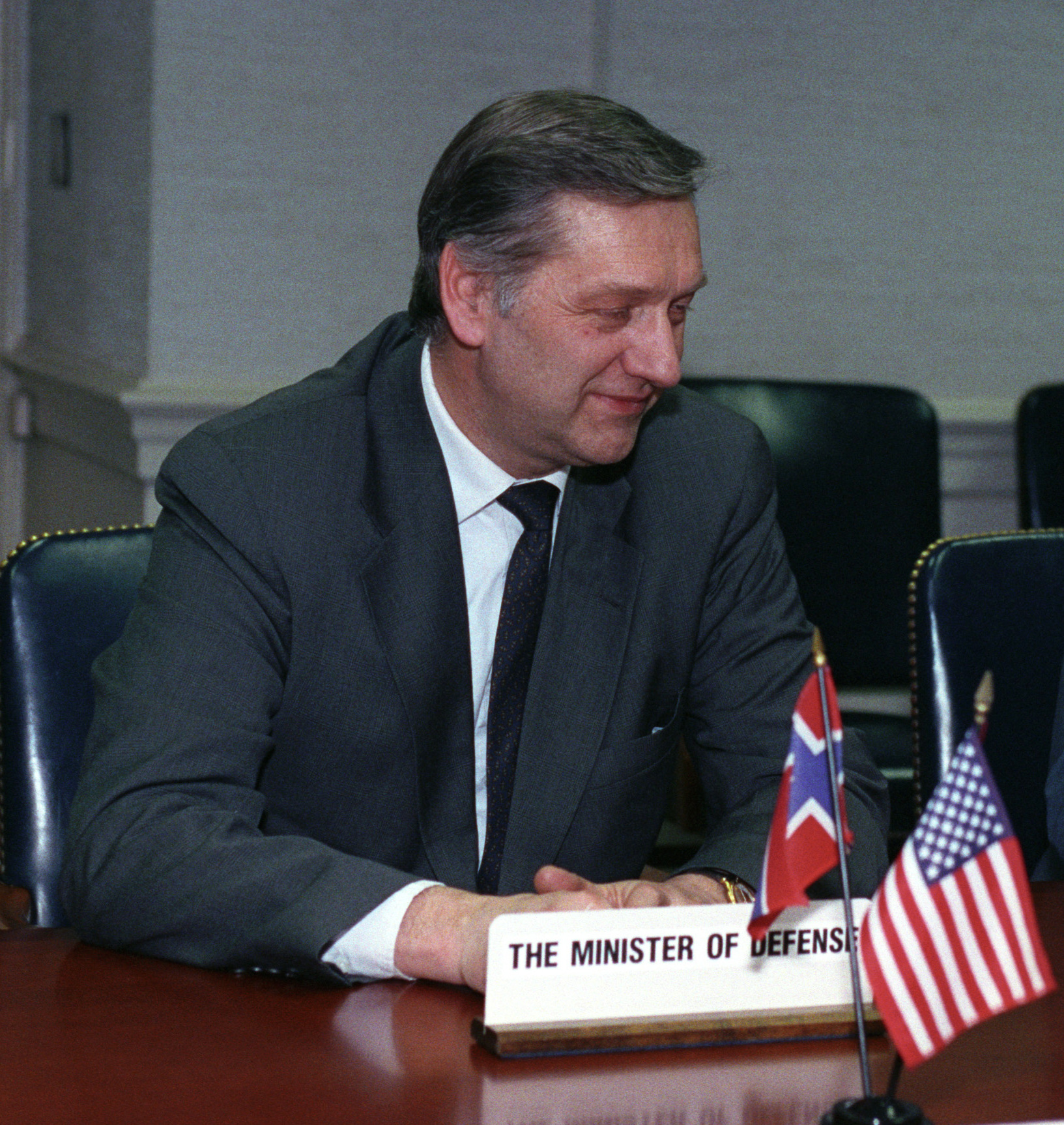
- Holst in March 1993

Minister of Foreign Affairs
- In office 2 April 1993 – 13 January 1994
- Prime Minister: Gro Harlem Brundtland
- Preceded by: Thorvald Stoltenberg
- Succeeded by: Bjørn Tore Godal
- In office 26 February – 9 March 1987; Acting
- Prime Minister: Gro Harlem Brundtland
- Preceded by: Knut Frydenlund
- Succeeded by: Thorvald Stoltenberg

Minister of Defence
- In office 3 November 1990 – 2 April 1993
- Prime Minister: Gro Harlem Brundtland
- Preceded by: Per Ditlev-Simonsen
- Succeeded by: Jørgen Kosmo
- In office 9 May 1986 – 16 October 1989
- Prime Minister: Gro Harlem Brundtland
- Preceded by: Rolf Presthus
- Succeeded by: Per Ditlev-Simonsen

Personal details
- Born: 29 November 1937 Oslo, Norway
- Died: 13 January 1994 (aged 56) Nesodden, Norway
- Party: Labour Party
- Spouse: Marianne Heiberg
- Relations: Jens Stoltenberg (nephew)
- Education: Columbia University (AB)

Johan Jørgen Holst (29 November 1937 – 13 January 1994) was a Norwegian politician representing Labour, best known for his involvement with the Oslo Accords.

Holst was Minister of Defence from 1987 to 1989 and from 1990 to April 1993. He then became Minister of Foreign Affairs, a position he held to his death. During his time in the Ministry of Foreign Affairs he was heavily involved in the process that led to the Oslo Accords. He suffered a minor stroke in December 1993 and was admitted to a hospital. He never fully recovered and died a month later. His wife Marianne Heiberg later said that he had worked himself to death with the peace process.

In his memory, the city of Gaza created the Holst Park, an activity center for children of Gaza from 6 to 16. Holst was educated at Oslo Cathedral School, where he completed his examen artium in 1956. He then completed his mandatory military service at the prestigious Russian language program of the Norwegian Armed Forces. He then studied at Columbia College of Columbia University, where he obtained his A.B. in 1960 and where he was honored with its John Jay Award for Distinguished Professional Achievement shortly after his death—the first time the prize had been given posthumously. Through his marriage Mr. Holst was the uncle of Jens Stoltenberg, the prime minister of Norway throughout central parts of the 2000s. Friends of Israel in the Norwegian Labour Movement (Norwegian: Venner av Israel i Norsk Arbeiderbevegelse), planted a forest to his memory in Israel.

Political offices
Preceded by Rolf Presthus	Minister of Defence; 1986–1989	Succeeded by Per Ditlev-Simonsen
Preceded by Per Ditlev-Simonsen	Minister of Defence; 1990–1993	Succeeded by Jørgen Kosmo
Preceded by Thorvald Stoltenberg	Minister of Foreign Affairs; 1993–1994	Succeeded by Bjørn Tore Godal
Academic offices
Preceded by John Sanness	Director of the Norwegian Institute of International Affairs; 1981–1986	Succeeded by Kjell Skjelsbæk
Preceded by Kjell Skjelsbæk	Director of the Norwegian Institute of International Affairs; 1989–1990	Succeeded by Olav Fagelund Knudsen
