= Kjell Pihlstrøm =

Norwegian journalist

Correspondent of the Norwegian Broadcasting Corporation in Stockholm
- In office 1993–1997 Serving with Ivar Hippe
- Preceded by: Viggo Johansen
- Succeeded by: Hedvig Bjørgum

Personal details
- Born: Kjell Pihlstrøm; 21 September 1948 (age 77) Oslo, Norway
- Education: University of Oslo
- Occupation: Journalist

Kjell Pihlstrøm (born 21 September 1948) is a Norwegian journalist.

Born in Risør, he took the cand.philol. degree at the University of Oslo, majoring in history. He was hired in the Norwegian Broadcasting Corporation (NRK) in 1976.

From 1990 he was a program director in NRK P2, then director of the Radio Sports department from 1992, correspondent in Stockholm from 1994, editor of Dagsnytt from 1997, correspondent in Stockholm again from 1999, and then district editor for Southern Norway. He retired from NRK in 2015.

He has also issued three books: Borgfred og samling i krise? (1975), Stormen om Stilla (1981, with Jan Ditlev Hansen) and Jeg så det hende (1989, with Harald Queseth).

Media offices
| Preceded by Ivar Hippe | Norwegian Broadcasting Corporation correspondent in Stockholm; 1994–1997 | Succeeded by Hedvig Bjørgum |
| Preceded by Bjørn Bø | Norwegian Broadcasting Corporation correspondent in Stockholm; 1999–2006 | Succeeded by Berit Rekaa |
