= Tore Tønne =

Norwegian politician

Minister of Health and Social Affairs
- In office 17 March 2000 – 19 October 2001
- Prime Minister: Jens Stoltenberg
- Preceded by: Dagfinn Høybråten
- Succeeded by: Dagfinn Høybråten

Personal details
- Born: 5 March 1948 Ogndal, Nord-Trøndelag, Norway
- Died: 20 December 2002 (aged 54) Lier, Buskerud, Norway
- Party: Labour

Tore Tønne (5 March 1948 – 20 December 2002) was the Norwegian politician who served as the minister of health and social affairs (responsible for social affairs) from 2000 to 2001 in the Jens Stoltenberg's first cabinet. Tønne committed suicide after newspaper writings about investigations over alleged economic improprieties committed after the conclusion of his term in the Norwegian cabinet. This incident led to a debate about media responsibility and individual rights in Norway and is considered to be one of the significant political scandals in Norway.

Ivar Hippe wrote a book about him entitled Mektig og avmektig: Tore Tønne, media og maktspillet bak kulissene.
