= Ole Torp =

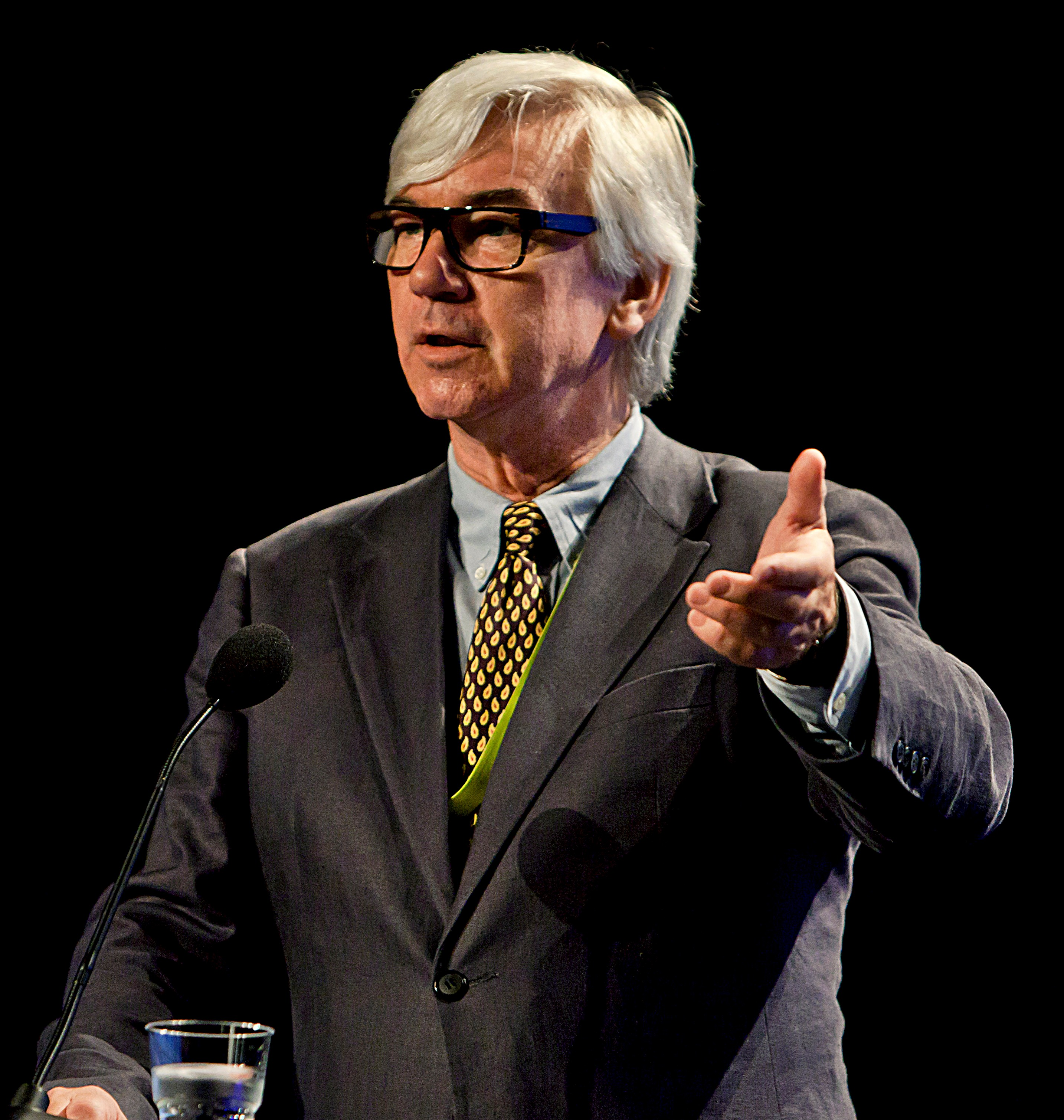
Ole Torp, 2011.

Ole Nicolay Torp (born 17 September 1951) is a Norwegian former television presenter and correspondent.

He was born in Bergen, and started his journalistic career in Bergens Arbeiderblad. After a stint in Dagbladet he was hired in the Norwegian Broadcasting Corporation (NRK). He served as the channel's correspondent in Washington, DC from 1998 to 2002 and in Asia from 2007 to 2010. From 2010 to 2015 he presented the debate show Aktuelt, superseded by a one-on-one talk show in 2015 called Torp.

Media offices
Preceded by Gunnar Myklebust	NRK correspondent in Washington, DC; 1998–2002	Succeeded by Joar Hoel Larsen
Preceded by Philip Lote	NRK correspondent in Asia; 2007–2010	Succeeded by Anders Magnus
