= Magne Lerø =

Norwegian publisher and magazine editor (born 1954)

Magne Lerø (born 7 April 1954) is a Norwegian publisher and magazine editor.

A cand.theol. by education, from 1979 he also has a Master of Management degree from BI Norwegian Business School from 1996. Within the religious field he has worked as a priest, curate, director of information in the Norwegian YMCA/YWCA, managing director of the Norwegian Bible Society and Verbum publishing house. He was CEO of Lovisenberg Hospital from 1992 to 1996.

From 2004 to 2009 he was the CEO and editor-in-chief of Ad Fontes Medier, the publisher of Økonomisk Rapport, Ny Tid and Ukeavisen Ledelse. From Ad Fontes Medier Lerø bought several magazines and started publishing them out of the company Medier og Ledelse in 2013. In 2014 Lerø bought the magazine Plot which was brought under the Medier og Ledelse umbrella, and became its chief editor.
