= John Kristen Skogan =

Norwegian political scientist and politician

John Kristen Skogan (born 1942) is a Norwegian political scientist and politician for the Conservative Party.

He graduated from the University of Oslo with the mag.art. degree (PhD equivalent) in 1971. He was a research assistant at the Norwegian Defence Research Establishment from 1967 to 1968 and a research associate at the International Institute for Strategic Studies from 1974 to 1975. Since 1970 he has worked as a researcher at the Norwegian Institute of International Affairs.

From 1989 to 1990, when the cabinet Syse held office, Skogan was appointed State Secretary in the Ministry of Defence.
