= Urix =

- Country of origin: Norway
- Original language: Norwegian

Production
- Production locations: Oslo, Norway
- Running time: 20 minutes

Original release
- Network: NRK2; NRK1
- Release: 6 September 2002

Related
- NRK News

Urix is a foreign affairs television newsmagazine aired Monday to Thursday night on the Norwegian television channel NRK2, a subsidiary channel of the Norwegian Broadcasting Corporation (NRK). The first show aired on 2 September 2002, and is produced by the same crew as Dagsrevyen. The title is a play on the word utenriks, meaning "outside the kingdom (Norway)".

Former presenters include Christian Borch, Annette Groth, Bjørn Hansen, Sigrun Slapgard and Gunnar Myklebust.

== NRK foreign correspondents ==
NRK's correspondents are based in Washington DC (2), Nairobi (2), Beijing, London, Moscow, Berlin (2), Rio de Janeiro and Istanbul.
