= Jon Gelius =

Norwegian journalist

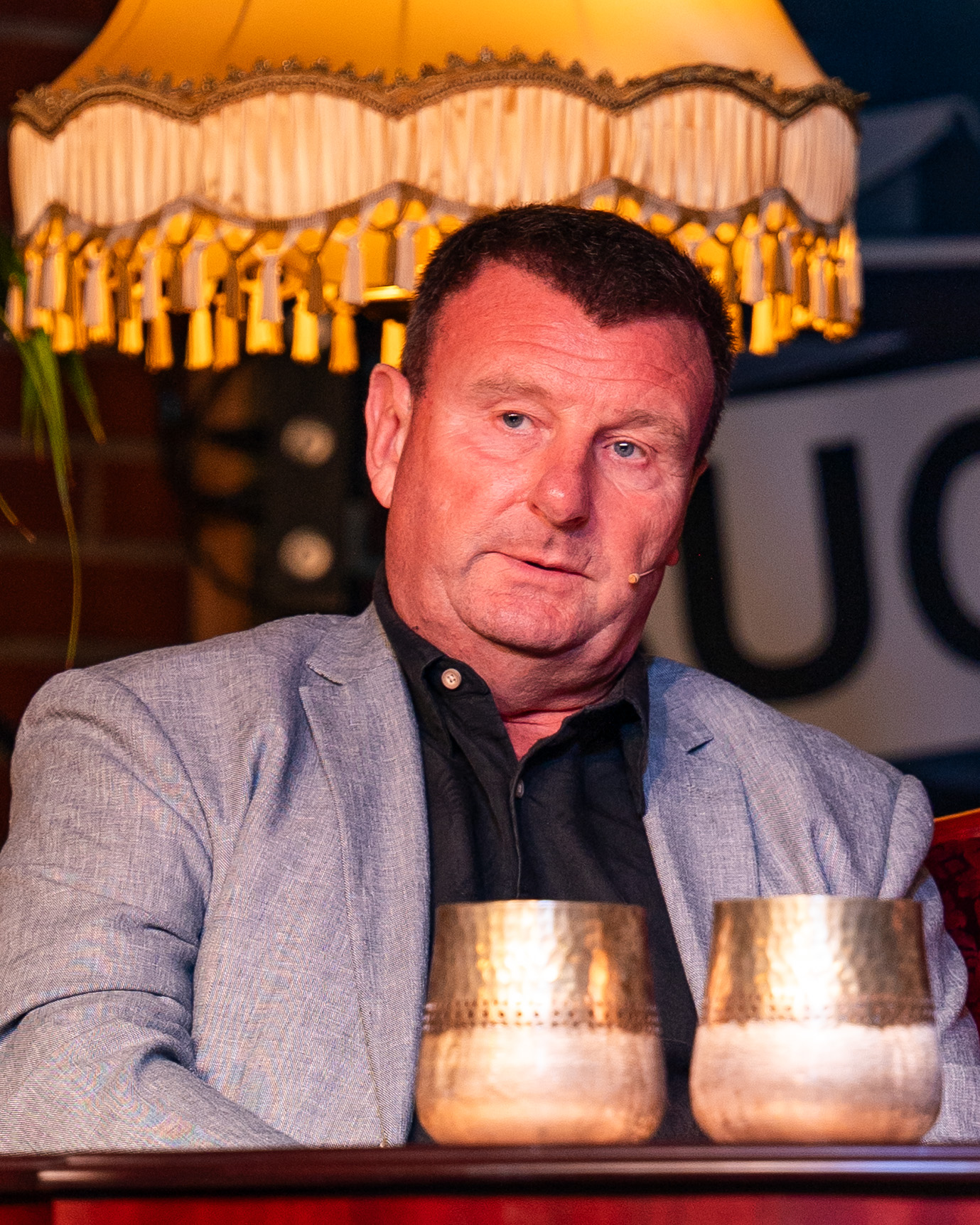
- Jon Gelius (2025)
- Born: May 26, 1964 (age 62); Arendal, Norway
- Occupation: Journalist

Jon Gelius (born May 26, 1964 in Arendal) is a Norwegian journalist.

Born in Arendal, he has worked as a reporter and presenter with both Dagsrevyen and Dagsnytt. In recent years he is best known as one of the Dagsrevyen main news anchors. He was appointed as television news editor in 2008.

Until 2010 he was the television news editor of NRK, and as such the editor of Dagsrevyen and other programmes. In 2010 he became their correspondent in Washington, DC. His tenure ended in 2013.

Gelius is the brother of the former priest and Labour politician Einar Gelius.

Media offices
Preceded by Tove Bjørgaas	Norwegian Broadcasting Corporation correspondent in Washington, DC; 2010–2013	Succeeded by Gro Holm
