= Daniel Heradstveit =

Norwegian political scientist

- Born: 4 September 1940; Norheimsund, Norway
- Died: 7 February 2018 (aged 77)
- Education: University of Oslo
- Employer(s): Norwegian Institute of International Affairs; University of Bergen
- Relatives: Per Øyvind Heradstveit (brother)

Daniel Heradstveit (4 September 1940 – 7 February 2018) was a Norwegian political scientist.

== Personal life ==
Heradstveit was born in Norheimsund on 4 September 1940. He was a brother of broadcasting journalist Per Øyvind Heradstveit.

== Career ==
Graduating as cand.mag. from the University of Oslo in 1967, Heradstveit graduated with a dr. degree in 1979. His doctorate thesis titled Psychological Obstacles to Peace treated the Israeli–Palestinian conflict. He was assigned to the Norwegian Institute of International Affairs from 1969 to 1984, and from 2006. He was appointed professor of comparative politics at the University of Bergen from 1986 to 1996. He also had professorships at The Johns Hopkins University SAIS Europe in Bologna and at the Syracuse University in New York. A researcher on international relations, his speciality was on the Middle East.
