= Ivar Hippe =

Norwegian journalist (born 1953)

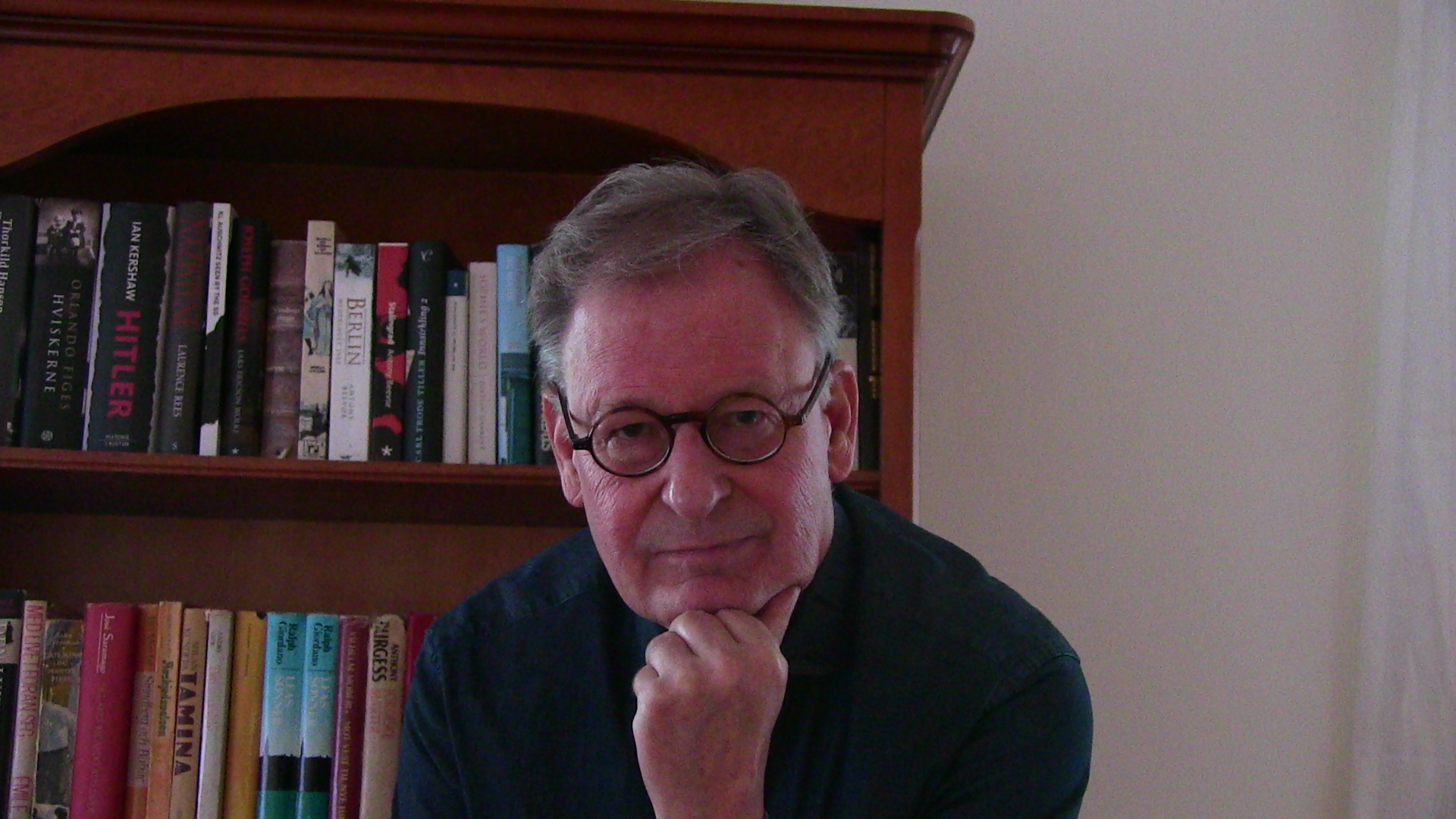

Correspondent of the Norwegian Broadcasting Corporation in Stockholm
- In office 1992–1994 Serving with Viggo Johansen and Kjell Pihlstrøm
- Preceded by: Ingvild Bryn
- Succeeded by: Kjell Pihlstrøm

Personal details
- Born: Ivar Hippe; 19 March 1953 (age 73) Oslo, Norway
- Education: University of Oslo
- Occupation: Consultant; Journalist
- Known for: editor-in-chief of Økonomisk Rapport

Ivar Hippe (born 19 March 1953) is a Norwegian author, political consultant, former journalist and presenter. He received national media attention in 1982 when he was expelled from Argentina by the government. On his return to Norway he began working for the Norwegian Broadcasting Corporation (NRK). In 1999 he became editor-in-chief of the Norwegian financial journal Økonomisk Rapport.

In 2003 he wrote the book Mektig og avmektig: Tore Tønne, media og maktspillet bak kulissene, which followed Tore Tønne's last days before his suicide. The book received good reviews and, after the book's release, Hippe started working as a political consultant. His next book, Korstoget mot velferdsstaten: På innsiden av nyliberale tenketanker, was published in 2021.

== Career ==
Hippe was born in Oslo and studied at the University of Oslo where he earned the academic degree candidatus rerum politicarum. By the late 1970s Hippe had joined the Latin American Group in Oslo and became one of its leading members. The organisation had around 80 members and had collaborated with Amnesty International on projects involving Latin America. Hippe later landed a job as a journalist for the Norwegian newspaper Dagbladet and became the paper's correspondent in Argentina. Hippe and Frode Holst, a journalist from Norwegian newspaper Verdens Gang, were arrested and expelled from Argentina in 1982 by the Ministry of Foreign Affairs who claimed that they were spies working for the British government. Holst was put on a plane to Brazil and Hippe left for Santiago, Chile. In a press conference Argentina's Minister of Interior Bernardo Menendez claimed that the journalists were "compromising national security". In 1984 he sent a job application to the Norwegian Broadcasting Corporation (NRK) to become their translator whilst in Latin America. When he moved back to Norway he worked for NRK Arbeiderbladet and Fafo. Until 1999 Hippe worked in the economic news sector at NRK. In 1999 Hippe became Editor-in-Chief of Økonomisk Rapport (ØR). Hippe openly supported the Labour Party Prime Minister of Norway, Jens Stoltenberg from mid 2000 in Stoltenberg's first term (17 March 2000 to 19 October 2001). Hippe left his position as Editor-in-Chief in 2002 because the new owners did not share the same future plans for the magazine as he did. Six months after Hippe left a number of journalists and most of the old leadership staff had also left the magazine.

After quitting his job he was asked to write a book about Tore Tønne, and his recent suicide. When writing the book Hippe interviewed 60 key acquaintances, with the exception of Kjell Inge Røkke who had a friendly relationship with Tønne before his death. The book, entitled Mektig og avmektig: Tore Tønne, media og maktspillet bak kulissene (English: Powerful and Powerless: Tore Tønne, Media and the Power Play Behind the Scenes), was published in 2003 and received considerable acclaim. Before becoming a political consultant he was one of four who applied for the position as director of the Institute for Journalism in 2006. He was not chosen and instead became a consultant for the leader of the Norwegian Confederation of Trade Unions, Gerd-Liv Valla. In 2006 he worked for the Norwegian Foreign Ministry on the "Norwegian Project", a government-funded project with Brazil. According to Hippe the project works for an extensive social dialogue between the employers where they "deliberately chose cooperation and dialogue rather than confrontation and conflict with society around them". As of 2010 he works as a consultant for the public relations company Agendum and Hippe Consult, a company owned by himself. Hippe briefly worked as the consultant to Ellen Kristin Dahl-Pedersen who was set to inherit parts of Ellen Ugland's fortune. Until very recently Hippe worked as boxer Cecilia Brækhus' media consultant officer.

== Personal life ==
He is the older brother of Jon Hippe, the former leader of Fafo. He has two sons, Mathias and Trym, and a daughter, Olivia.

== Bibliography ==
- Avhengighet og demokrati: Brasils lange, usikre demokratiseringsprosess – en vei til demokratistabilisering?. 1984.
- Fra agitasjon til profesjonalitet. Sosialdemokratisk presse i Vest-Europa: den vanskelige overgangsprosessen. 1987.
- Det nye markedet i bedrifter: overnasjonalt eierbytte, finansspekulasjon og fusjonskontroll. 1990.
- Mektig og avmektig: Tore Tønne, media og maktspillet bak kulissene. 2003.
- Korstoget mot velferdsstaten: På innsiden av nyliberale tenketanker. 2021.
