= Standpunkt =

Norwegian television series

Standpunkt was a Norwegian debate programme shown on NRK1 from 20 August 2002. The programme was the week's biggest debate programme on NRK1, and had the goal of engaging the viewer in an interactive debate. Every Tuesday, the presenters invited up to 15 debaters to a 45 minute debate. Questions and responses from viewers had a central role, including SMS messages, e-mail, web, and telephone. SMS messages ran along the bottom of the TV screen, but others were also picked by the presenters and included in the debate.

The debates dealt with cultural, social, and diversity issues, as well as those involved with party politics.

NRK ended the programme in 2007.

== Presenters ==
- Nina Owing (2005–07)
- Erik Wold (2003 & 2005–07)

Former presenters:

- Jarle Roheim Håkonsen (2002–03 & 2005)
- Christine Præsttun (2002–05)
