= Namdalseid (village) =

Village in Namsos Municipality, Norway

- Village
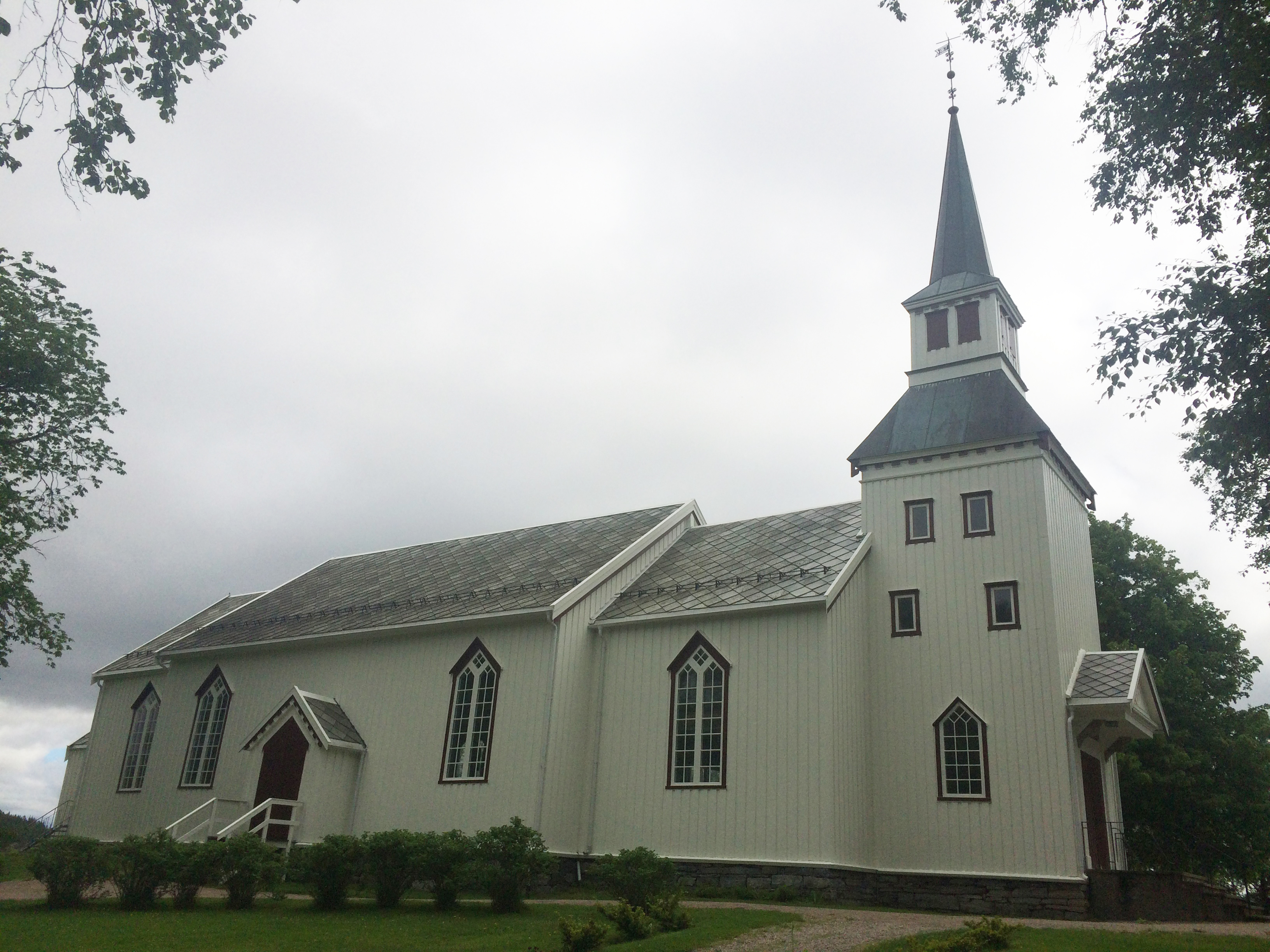
- View of the village church
- Interactive map of Namdalseid
- Location within Trøndelag Location within Norway
- Coordinates: 64.2219°N 11.2232°E
- Country: Norway
- Region: Central Norway
- County: Trøndelag
- District: Namdalen
- Municipality: Namsos Municipality

Area
  - Total: 0.3 km^{2} (0.12 sq mi)
- Elevation: 51 m (167 ft)

Population (2024)
  - Total: 331
  - Density: 1,103/km^{2} (2,860/sq mi)
- Time zone: UTC+01:00 (CET)
  - Summer (DST): UTC+02:00 (CEST)
- Post Code: 7750 Namdalseid

Namdalseid is a village in Namsos Municipality in Trøndelag county, Norway. The village is located along the Norwegian County Road 17, about 30 kilometres (19 mi) north of the town of Steinkjer and about the same distance south of the town of Namsos. The Namdalseid Church sits just southwest of the village. There's a school in the village as well.

The 0.3-square-kilometre (74-acre) village has a population (2024) of 331 and a population density of 1,103 inhabitants per square kilometre (2,860/sq mi).

Prior to 2020, the village was the administrative centre of the old Namdalseid Municipality.
