= NRK News =

News section of the Norwegian Broadcasting Corporation

NRK Nyheter
- Website type: Brand name for NRK News: NRK Dagsnytt (Radio); NRK Dagsrevyen (TV); Online newspaper
- Available in: Norwegian, Sami
- Headquarters: Oslo, Norway
- Website: www.nrk.no/nyheter/
- Launched: 1933; 93 years ago

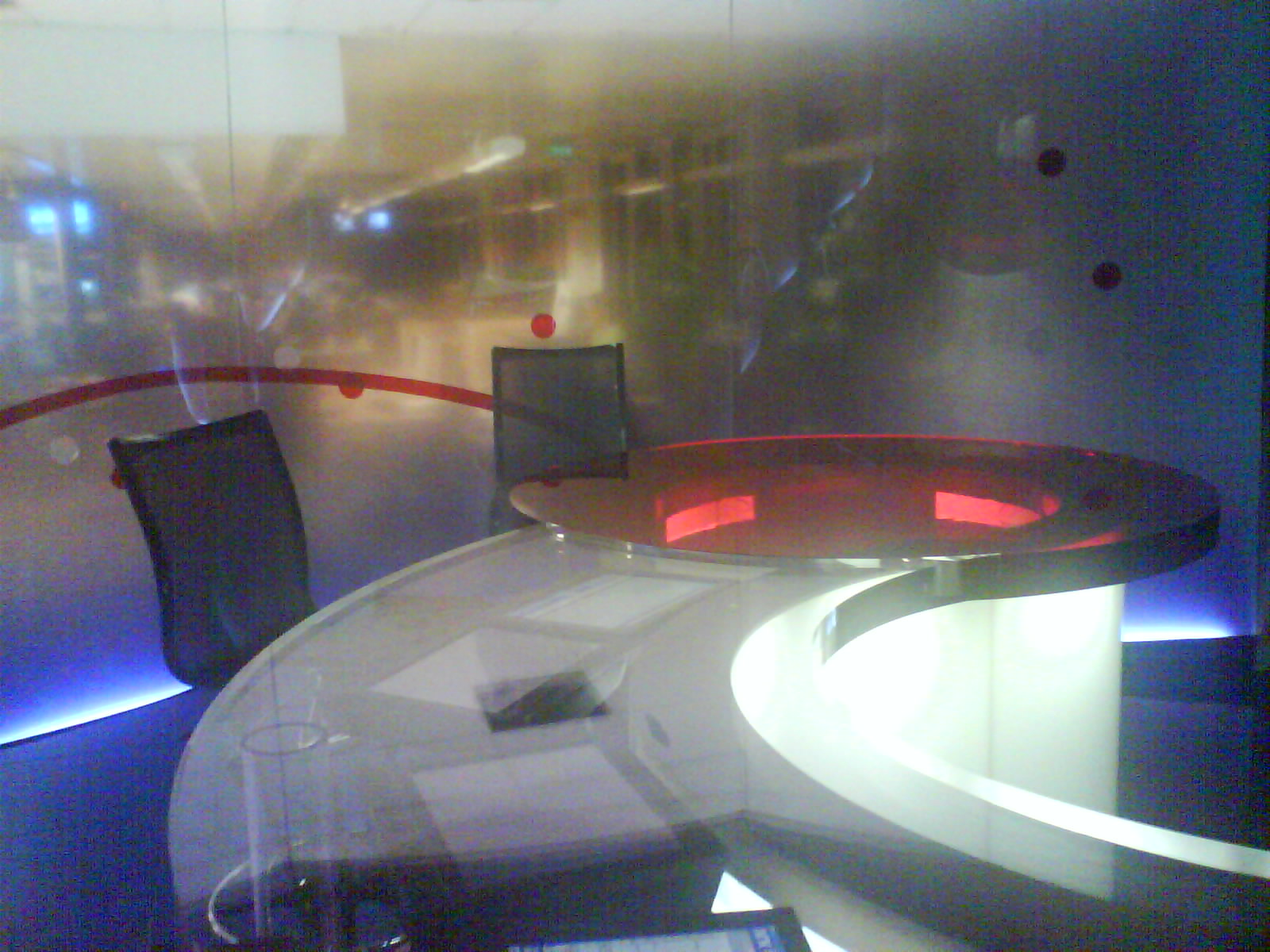
One of two NRK Dagsrevyen news studios, located in Oslo

NRK News (in Norwegian: NRK Nyheter) is the Norwegian Broadcasting Corporation's news organisation. It produces news around the clock for radio and television in Norwegian and Sami. There are two main newsrooms, one for radio (NRK Dagsnytt) and one for television (NRK Dagsrevyen); both are headquartered in the Norwegian capital Oslo. NRK also produces local news bulletins at newsrooms around the country. Internationally, NRK correspondents are based in Washington, D.C., Nairobi, Beijing, London, Moscow, Brussels, Berlin and Istanbul. Urix, produced by NRK News, is a television program that specializes in international news.

NRK Nyheter is a radio station that broadcasts news 24 hours a day in Norwegian, with some programming in Swedish from Sveriges Radio and overnight relays of BBC World Service programmes in English.

NRK's newsrooms also post news in Norwegian on the NRK website. The Norwegian Meteorological Institute with its website Yr.no and NRK Sport are the news department's closest partners.

NRK News aims to convey as reliable and unbiased news, information and documentaries as possible. As the largest media house in Norway, NRK News is watched closely by its users. There is an ongoing debate as to whether the corporation meets its aims.
