= Fafo Foundation =

Norwegian research foundation

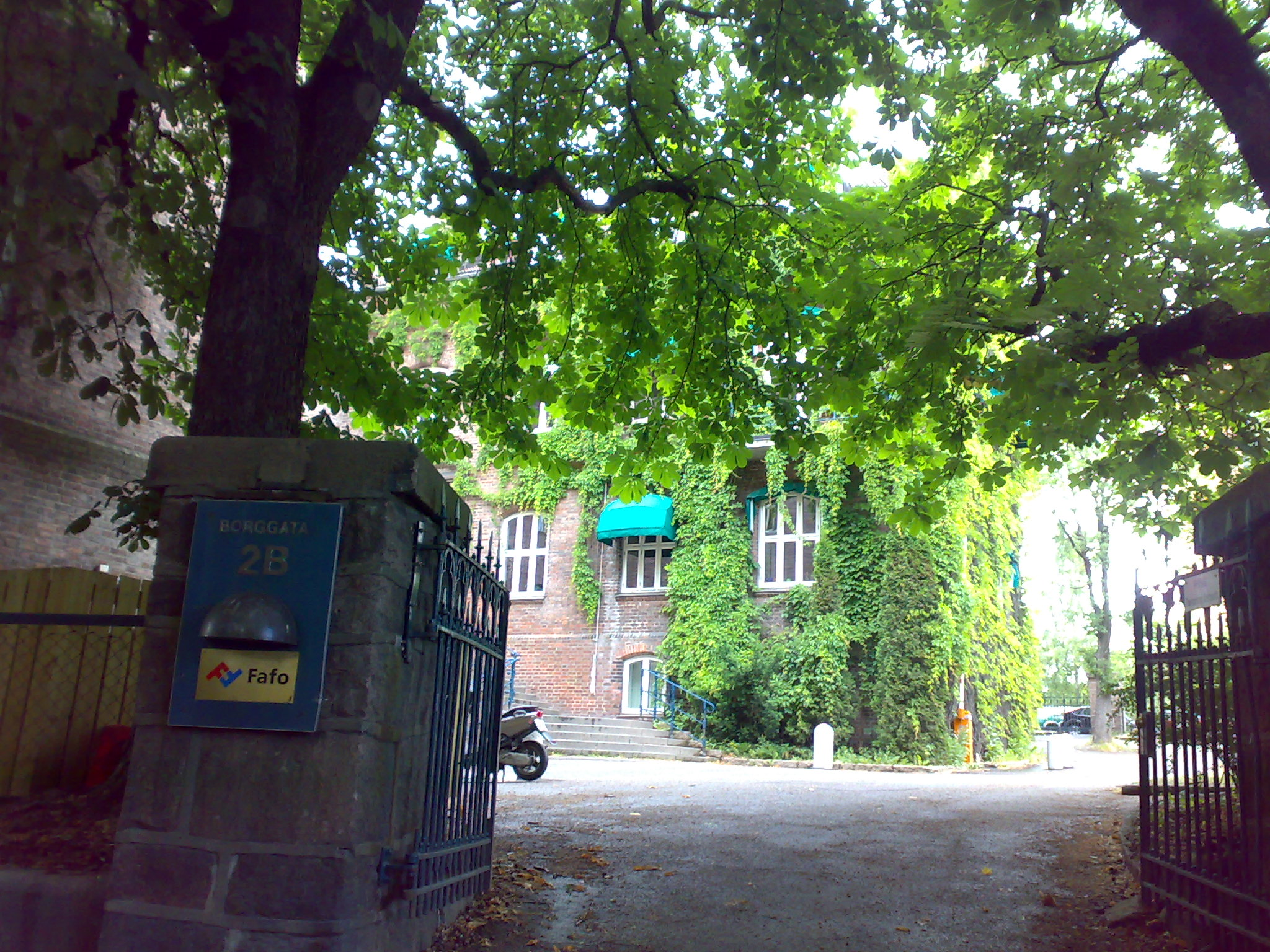
The main offices of the Fafo Foundation in Oslo

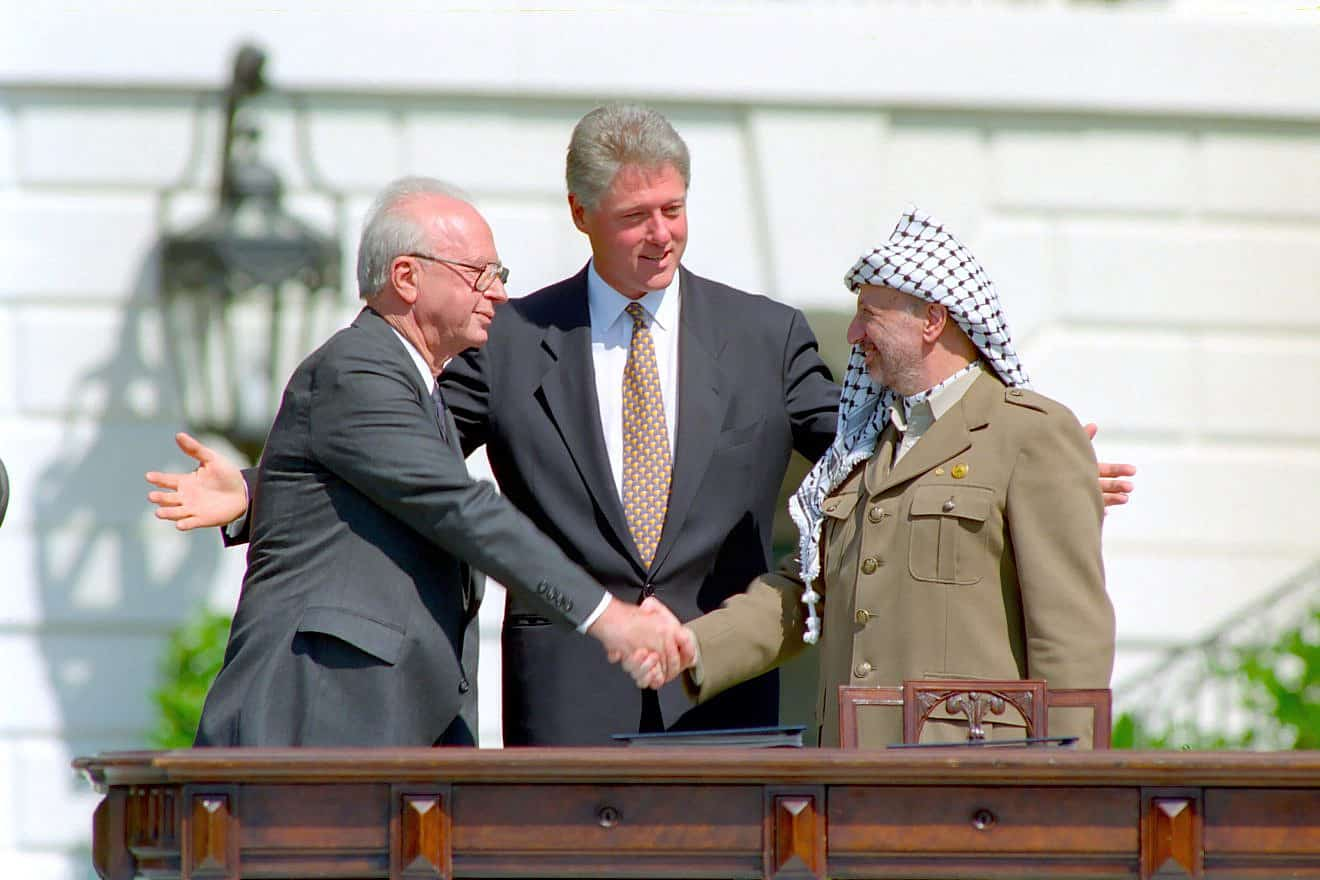
The Oslo Accords were the result of negotiations hosted by Fafo

The Fafo Research Foundation, also known as the Fafo Foundation or just Fafo (Norwegian: Forskningsstiftelsen Fafo), is a Norwegian research foundation and owner of the research institute: The Fafo Institute for Labour and Social Research. The institute conducts social research both in Norway and internationally. Fafo has its main office in Oslo and an office in Beijing.

Fafo was founded by the Norwegian Confederation of Trade Unions (LO) in 1982 and was reorganized as an independent research foundation in 1993 with contributions from the Norwegian Confederation of Trade Unions, Norwegian Union of Municipal and General Employees and six major Norwegian companies (Orkla Group, Umoe, Elkem, Coop Norge, Sparebank1 Gruppen and Telenor). The first director of Fafo was Terje Rød Larsen (1982–1993). Under his leadership, Fafo became increasingly involved in international peace research and politics, particularly in the Middle East, from the late 1980s; the institute played a central role in the negotiations that culminated in the Oslo Accords. The origin of the Oslo Accords can be traced back to a research project initiated by Fafo in the Palestinian territories, and the negotiations that led to the accords were hosted by Fafo in Oslo. Terje Rød Larsen would subsequently become a UN Under-Secretary-General responsible for coordinating the Middle East peace process.

Jon Hippe was director of Fafo from 2005 to 2015, when he was succeeded by Tone Fløtten, who is managing director of both the foundation and the research institute. As of 2020, Fafo employed 71 researchers. The foundation is also the owner of the independent analytical group Economics Norway (Norwegian: Samfunnsøkonomisk analyse), consisting of 15 employees as of 2020.

== Fafo Institute for Labour and Social Research ==
In 2015 Fafo merged its international research division into the Fafo Institute for Labour and Social Research (Norwegian: Fafo Institutt for arbeidslivs- og velferdsforskning). Its scope is industrial relations and labour market policy, social policy and the welfare state, and studies of work and enterprise development. Its international approach is mostly based on living condition surveys in areas previously excluded from social science research, such as Haiti, China and Iraq. Fields included are labour relations, welfare policy, and living conditions.

Fafo has conducted extensive research on the Nordic model, most notably through heading two major research projects in the Nordic countries, commissioned by SAMAK in 2012 and the Nordic Council of Ministers in 2017. Internationally, Fafo was also commissioned by the Central Party School of the Chinese Communist Party to participate in an educational program on the foundations of the Norwegian society model. A representative of the school cited a wish to learn more about the Norwegian approaches to the welfare state and environmental protection.

Sissel Trygstad and Hanne C. Kavli are Heads of Research, and Tone Fløtten is Managing Director.

== In popular culture ==
The institute is mentioned in the Black Debbath song Fafo.

== See also ==
- Norwegian Institute of International Affairs
