= Svein Gjerdåker =

Norwegian newspaper editor

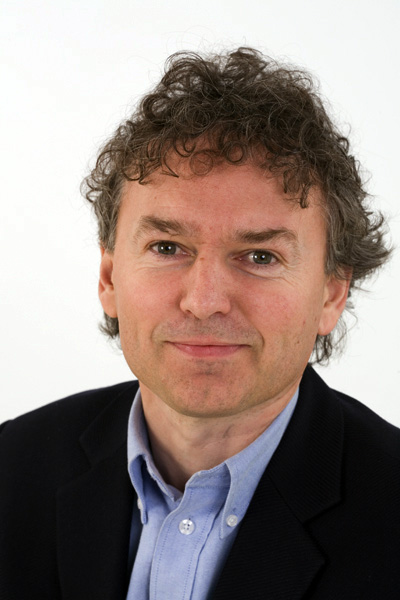
Svein Gjerdåker

Svein Gjerdåker (born 6 September 1963) is a Norwegian newspaper editor.

He hails from Voss Municipality, and took his education at the University of Bergen. He later worked for the Chr. Michelsen Institute and Universitetsforlaget. In 2001 he was hired as editor-in-chief of Dag og Tid.

He is married to Ingvild Bryn. They have two adopted children.
