= Økonomisk Rapport =

Weekly business magazine in Oslo, Norway (1974–2013)

- Categories: Business magazine
- Frequency: Weekly
- Circulation: 24,000 (2002)
- Founded: 1974
- Final issue: January 2013
- Country: Norway
- Based in: Oslo
- Website: Homepage
- ISSN: 0332-5555
- OCLC: 13134842

Økonomisk Rapport (Danish: Financial Report) was a monthly business magazine published in Oslo, Norway. The magazine was in circulation between 1974 and January 2013.

== History and profile ==
The magazine was founded in 1974. Previously owned by Fora Medier, the magazine was based in Oslo. Although it was not originally started as a business publication, the magazine was redesigned as a business-oriented publication when Hjemmet Mortensen acquired it. In 2002 Hjemmet Mortensen sold the magazine to a group of investors. In 2006 Media House Vårt Land or Mentor Media came in as a major shareholder of the magazine. Ivar Hippe was the editor-in-chief of the magazine from 1999 to 2002. Another editor-in-chief was Terje Aurdal.

At the beginning of 2013 the magazine together with its sister publications Kultmag and Mandag Morgen was sold by Mentor Media to Magne Lerø. In late January 2013 Magne Lerø announced that Økonomisk Rapport would be closed.

The magazine sold 24,946 copies in 2000 and 24,000 copies in 2002.
