= John Sanness =

Norwegian historian and politician

John Christian Munthe Sanness (24 May 1913 – 6 November 1984) was a Norwegian historian and politician for the Labour Party. He is known as the director of the Norwegian Institute of International Affairs from 1960 to 1983, professor at the University of Oslo from 1966 to 1983 and chair of the Norwegian Nobel Committee from 1979 to 1981.

== Early career ==
He was born in Leipzig as a son of Stian Sanness (1880–1966) and Hanne Theodora Munthe (1882–1954). The family moved to Kristiania seven years later, and Sanness attended Kristiania Cathedral School. He joined the revolutionary group Mot Dag during this period, and was expelled from his school for protests against the 25-year anniversary of the monarchy in 1930. He later declined an offer to be reentered, and finished his secondary education as a private candidate. In 1940 he chaired the Norwegian Students' Society.

In April 1940, Norway was invaded and occupied by Nazi Germany. Sanness learned from a Norwegian official in the government that he was on a list of people who would be arrested by the Gestapo, so he escaped to neutral Sweden. He travelled to London in 1941. Here he worked as a secretary for Arne Ording. Both Sanness and Ording had been Mot Dag members, but were now more mainstream Labour Party members. In addition to working for Ording, Sanness was involved in BBC broadcasts to occupied Norway, and he was a commentator in the illegal press.

== Post-war career ==
He worked as the foreign affairs editor in the newspaper Arbeiderbladet from 1946 to 1950. He also taught at the University of Oslo, and took his doctorate in 1959 with the thesis Patrioter, intelligens og skandinaver. Norske reaksjoner på skandinavismen før 1848, a work on Scandinavism. He was the director of the Norwegian Institute of International Affairs (NUPI) from 1960 to 1983, and a professor of history at the University of Oslo from 1966 to 1983.

Notable releases include Verden blir én 1850–1914, volume five of Aschehougs verdenshistorie released in 1955. He also published studies on the Soviet Union (Sovjetsamveldet under Khrustsjov, Bergen 1960; Some Problems in the Study of Soviet Foreign Policy, 1978), Norwegian foreign policy (Norsk alliansefri politikk?, 1978) and historiography (Norske historikere og den kalde krigen, 1984). He edited the encyclopedia Tidens Leksikon, released in 1975–1976, together with Einar Gerhardsen and Odd Højdahl. He also edited the periodical Samtiden from 1964 to 1967.

He sat on the Norwegian Nobel Committee from 1970 to 1981 and was chair from 1979 to 1981. Some of the Nobel Peace Prizes awarded during his time in the committee were controversial, especially the 1973 award to Lê Đức Thọ and Henry Kissinger, which caused two committee members to resign.

Sanness was fluent many foreign languages, including German, Russian, French and Spanish. He also spoke some Finnish. Since 1939 he was married to Dagny, née Goa. His wife outlived him as he died in November 1984 in Oslo.

Cultural offices
Preceded by Aase Lionæs	Chairman of the Norwegian Nobel Committee; 1979–1981	Succeeded by Egil Aarvik
