= Namdalseid Church =

Church in Trøndelag, Norway

- Namdalseid kirke
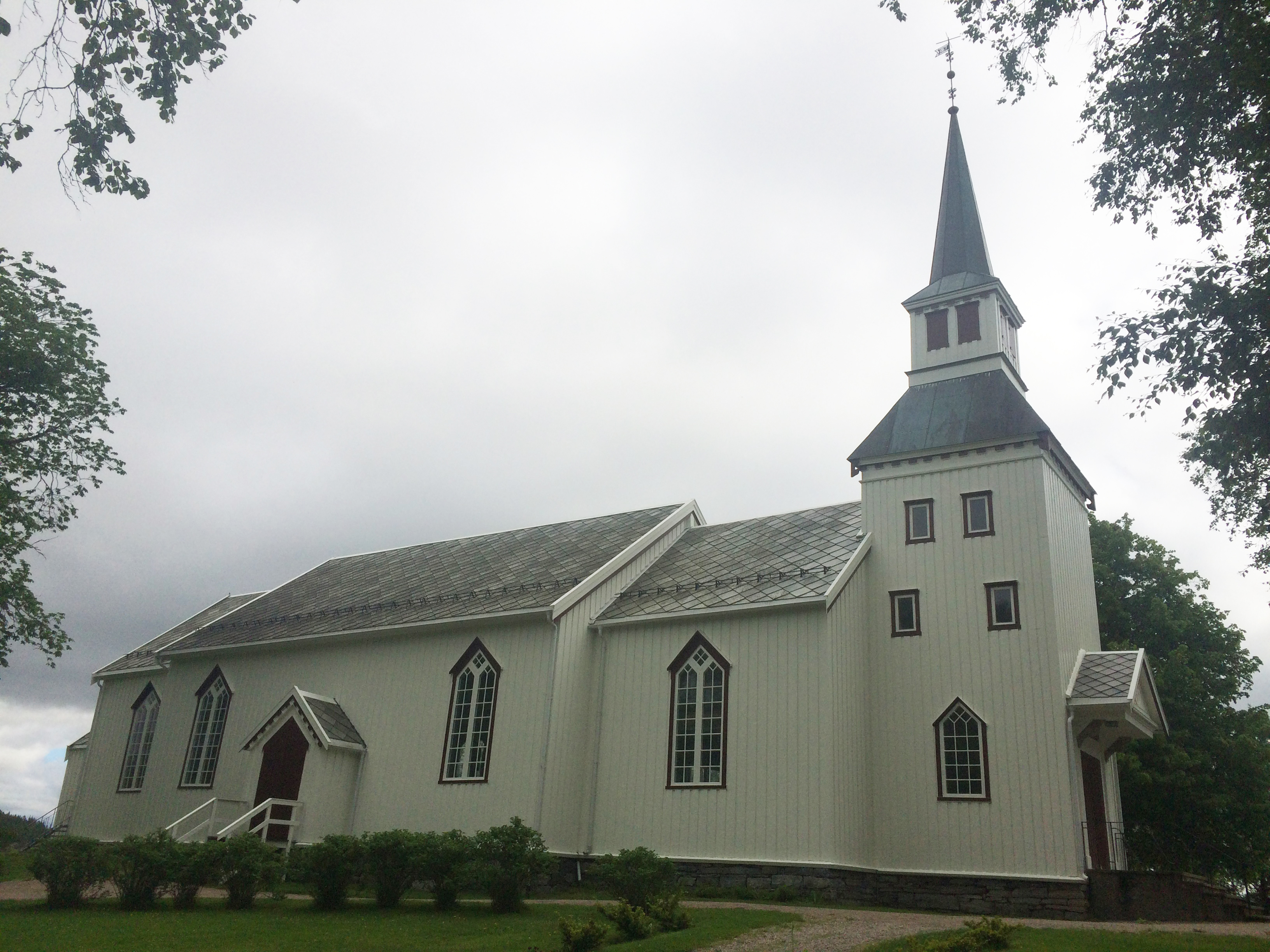
- View of the church
- Namdalseid Church
- 64.21810831°N 11.21001631°E
- Location: Namsos Municipality, Trøndelag
- Country: Norway
- Denomination: Church of Norway
- Churchmanship: Evangelical Lutheran

History
- Status: Parish church
- Founded: 14th century
- Consecrated: 19 Aug 1858

Architecture
- Functional status: Active
- Architect: Christian Heinrich Grosch
- Architectural type: Long church
- Completed: 1858 (168 years ago)

Specifications
- Capacity: 350
- Materials: Wood

Administration
- Diocese: Nidaros bispedømme
- Deanery: Namdal prosti
- Parish: Namdalseid
- Norwegian Cultural Heritage Site
- Type: Church
- Status: Listed
- ID: 85089

Namdalseid Church (Norwegian: Namdalseid kirke) is a parish church of the Church of Norway in Namsos Municipality in Trøndelag county, Norway. It is located in the village of Namdalseid, along Norwegian County Road 17. It is the church for the Namdalseid parish which is part of the Namdal prosti (deanery) in the Diocese of Nidaros. The white, wooden church was built in a long church style in 1858, using plans drawn up by the architect Christian Heinrich Grosch. The church seats about 350 people.

== History ==
The earliest existing historical records of the church date back to 1589, but the church was likely built during the 14th century. The first church in Namdalseid was probably a stave church and was located at Elda, about 5 kilometres (3.1 mi) south of the present church site. Around 1690, the old church burned down. It was rebuilt around 1702. The name of the parish was changed from Elda to Aas by a royal resolution on 30 December 1853. At the same time, the parish was authorized to move the church from Elda to Aas, just outside the village of Namdalseid. In 1858, a new church was completed at Aas, about 5 kilometres (3.1 mi) north of the historic church site at Elda. After the new church was completed, the old church at Elda was torn down. The new church was designed by Christian Heinrich Grosch, and the builder was Rasmus Overrein. The church was consecrated on 19 August 1858. A royal resolution from 10 July 1894 changed the name of the parish from Aas to Namdalseid, the name of the municipality in which it was located.

== See also ==
- List of churches in Nidaros
