= Norwegian Institute of International Affairs =

The Norwegian Institute of International Affairs (Norwegian: Norsk utenrikspolitisk institutt; NUPI) is a Norwegian research institution based in Oslo, Norway. It was established by the Norwegian parliament in 1959.

== Creation ==
The Norwegian Institute of International Affairs was created by the Storting (Norwegian parliament) in 1959 to carry out research in international relations.

== Funding ==
NUPI is funded by the Norwegian Ministry of Education and Research. NUPI researchers are independent. Several of its directors have been prominent Labour politicians, including John Sanness, Johan Jørgen Holst and Jan Egeland. Three of its other researchers, Anders C. Sjaastad, John Kristen Skogan and Janne Haaland Matlary, have been members of centre-right or centrist governments.

== Organisation ==
Kari Osland became director in 2023 and is the institute's first female director. The institute employs research professors (corresponding to full professors), senior researchers (corresponding to associate professors), researchers (corresponding to assistant professors), and non-academic staff.

The institute is organised into five research groups As of January 2022):

- Research group for Security and defence
- Research group for Russia, Asia and International Trade
- Research group for Peace, Conflict and Development
- Research group for Global Order and Diplomacy
- Research group on Climate and Energy

=== Directors ===
The position was originally a permanent appointment. In 1996 it was changed to a once-renewable 6-year appointment.

- John Sanness 1959–83 (Note: Daniel Heradstveit served as Acting Director during part of this period.)
- Johan Jørgen Holst 1983–1986 and 1989–1990 (Note: Holst was on leave from March 1986 to November 1989 (as Minister of Defence) and from November 1990 to January 1994 (as Minister of Defence and Minister of Foreign Affairs).)
- Kjell Skjelsbæk 1986–1989
- Olav Fagelund Knudsen 1990–1995
- Olav Stokke 1996
- Sverre Lodgaard 1997–2007
- Jan Egeland 2007–2011
- Ulf Sverdrup 2012–2023
- Kari Osland 2023–
