= Dagsrevyen =

Norwegian television news program

- Studio used from 2007–2015
- Country of origin: Norway
- Original language: Norwegian

Production
- Production locations: Oslo, Norway
- Running time: Monday-Friday: 30 minutes (from 2010: 45 minutes); Saturday and Sunday: 45 minutes

Original release
- Network: NRK1 (1958-); NRK2 (2007 only)
- Release: 1958

Related
- NRK News

Dagsrevyen (English: The Daily Review) is the daily evening news programme for the Norwegian television channel NRK1, the main channel of the Norwegian Broadcasting Corporation (NRK), broadcast at 7 pm. In 2007, the programme started airing simultaneously on NRK's dedicated news channel NRK2, but this arrangement ended that same year. Dagsrevyen's first newscast was broadcast in 1958 and it has kept its name since. It is Norway's most viewed programme, with daily ratings of around one million. Around 200 people are involved in its production, with headquarters at Marienlyst in Oslo.

Dagsrevyen aims at fewer, but longer and more extensive stories than its competitors. NRK hosts a tight network of domestic journalists in addition to international correspondence offices, though NRK also uses footage acquired through the European Broadcasting Union. The show is hosted by two anchors. The Saturday and Sunday broadcasts are dubbed Lørdagsrevyen (The Saturday Review) and Søndagsrevyen (The Sunday Review), respectively.

The program is broadcast as Lørdagsrevyen and Søndagsrevyen on Saturdays and Sundays respectively. These broadcasts are more in-depth with longer reports than on weekdays. Sunday is the foreign affairs day, with many reports from faraway places. For many years, Dagsrevyen had a broadcast time of 30 minutes every day, but from January 4, 2010 this was extended to 45 minutes from Saturday to Thursday, meaning that it only broadcasts 30 minutes on Fridays. Dagsrevyen was awarded the honorary prize during Gullruten 2019 after celebrating 60 years of broadcasting a few months earlier.

The editor of television news is Solveig Tvedt and the lead news editor is Stein Bjøntegård. Ingerid Stenvold has been a newscaster on the show since 2010.

Other news-related broadcasts on NRK include Dagsrevyen 21, Kveldsnytt, Standpunkt (closed down), RedaksjonEN, Urix, and Dagsnytt, plus the radio shows Ukeslutt, Dagsnytt 18 and Her og Nå. NRK also broadcasts daily newscasts from most regional offices.
