= Sesam stasjon =

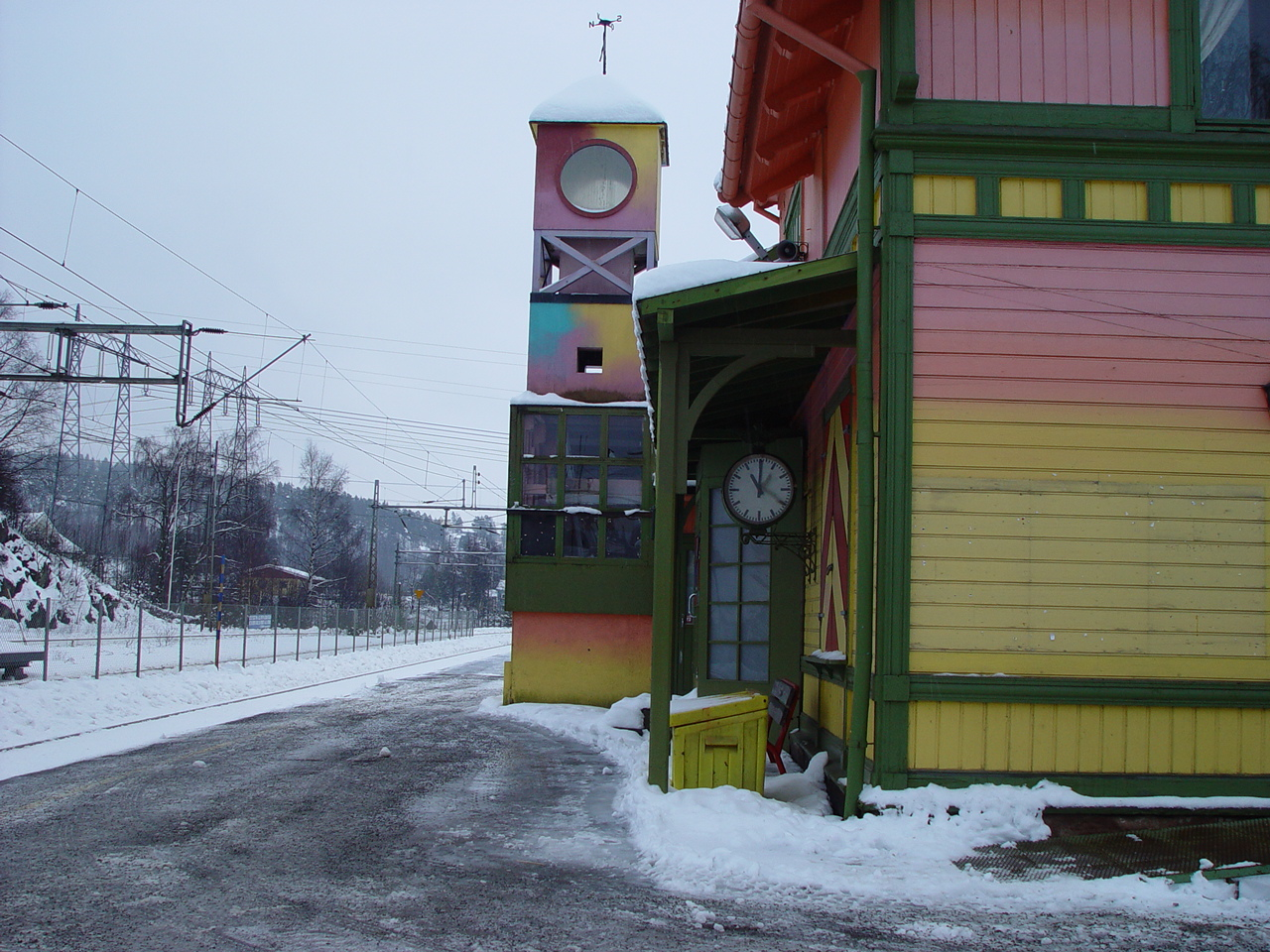
- The railway station
- Starring: Sverre Holm; Sidsel Ryen
- Voices of: Harald Mæle
- Country of origin: Norway
- Original language: Norwegian
- No. of episodes: 198

Production
- Camera setup: Multi-camera
- Running time: 30 minutes
- Production companies: NRK; Children's Television Workshop

Original release
- Network: NRK1
- Release: 22 February 1991 – 6 May 1999

Related
- Sesame Street

Sesam stasjon (English: Sesame Station) was a 1990s Norwegian children's television series that ran on NRK1 (and sometimes NRK2) based on Sesame Street. It quickly became the most popular children's show in Norway after its debut in 1991, and 198 episodes were made until 1999. Unlike their predecessors from all over the world it is set in a railway station near a town instead of the traditional Sesame Street neighbourhood, which is considered unusual among the international co-productions of Sesame Street. Each episode is 30 minutes, of which 15–20 are from the Norwegian production and 10–15 are dubbed from Sesame Street.

== History ==
In 1987, NRK approached Children's Television Workshop about the possibility to make a Norwegian co-production of Sesame Street. In 1989, an agreement was reached between NRK and CTW, and the production of Sesam stasjon began in September 1990. As part of the preparation for the show, Kermit Love traveled to Norway in June 1990 to teach the Norwegian puppeteers. The whole production also went to New York to observe the American production of Sesame Street.

The Norwegian producers were Herman Gran and Grete Høien. Eyvind Skeie and Lena Seimler wrote the teleplays, the costumes were designed by NRK's Costume Designer Ellen Andreassen Jensen while Sigvald Tveit wrote the music for the songs from the show. Harald Mæle was responsible for the voiceovers for the American cuts.

The first episode aired on NRK on 4 February 1991. In the beginning, the plan was to produce 77 episodes all written by Eyvind Skeie. In 1992, Skeie left the production after finishing his contract of 77 episodes. At the same time, NRK told CTW that they wanted to make another 250 episodes to run through 2006.

Although NRK had written in a contract with CTW that they were going to produce the show until 2001, as well as retaining a right to show reruns the first five years following, they decided to opt out of the production deal in 1998 due to lowered ratings. NRK also decided that the resources used to produce Sesam stasjon could be used better elsewhere, so NRK paid CTW to get out of the contract. The cast opposed its cancellation, to no avail.

The last scene was recorded on 28 April 1999, bringing the total to 198 episodes. However, Sesam stasjon stayed on the air in reruns until 2004.

== Content ==
Some of the episodes were like mini-series; the storyline would continue where the last episode left off. One of these longer stories was about how Alfa entered a contest to write a television show. She wrote about her life at Sesam stasjon, and she won the contest. The entire station was invited to NRK, so they could talk about the show. In a later episode, a TV crew from NRK arrived to shoot the TV show using actors to play Alfa and her friends. These "actors" were the walk-around suits, that were built for live appearances.

== Characters ==
=== Muppets ===
- Max Mekker: a big blue animal-like guy who works at Sesam stasjon. He is good at fixing things, hence the name "Mekker" (about the same as "handyman"). He always talks in rhyme. Played by Geir Børresen.
- Alfa: a female yellow muppet resident of the train station who likes to play the guitar. Played by Hanne Dahle.
- Bjarne: a male pink muppet who owns a ticket booth. He is very fond of numbers and being organized. He suffers from allergies, and therefore does not like summer. Played by Åsmund Huser.
- Py: a red muppet with yellow and red hair and the youngest at the station. She was hatched from a large blue egg that appeared on a train. Played by Christine Stoesen.
- Stasjonsmester O. Tidemann: station master. Played by Sverre Holm.
- Leonora Dorothea Dahl: a woman who works at the train station. She likes to sing and cook. Played by Sidsel Ryen.

The puppets used for the show had to be sent to the Children's Television Workshop (CTW) whenever they had to be rinsed, because the mechanism used to operate them was confidential. Only Geir Børresen was allowed inside Max Mekker.

=== Voices ===
- Magnus Nielsen as Ernie (Erling) and Anything Muppets
- Harald Mæle as Bert (Bernt), Grover (Gunnar) and Cookie Monster (Kakemonster) and Anything Muppets

Although not a character, the animated Pinball Number Count segments were also dubbed and used in the show regularly, and the melody is well recognized amongst Norwegians who have watched the show, despite most of them not having seen Sesame Street.

== Set ==
The outdoor scenes for the show were filmed at Lørenskog Station, which was repainted for the series. Only the station side was repainted in a colourful manner characteristic for Sesame Street, while its back was yellow and green. A postmodern clock tower was built alongside the station in the 1980s and was also painted for the show.

Sesamtoget (The Sesame Train) that was used in the show consisted of four parts. Norwegian State Railways (NSB) converted two old shunters, El 10 no. 2504 and no. 2508, and two Di 2 no. 827 and no. 839. The three carriages used were two earlier German BFV1 carriages, which NSB had taken ownership of after the war, and a modified goods van. All of the train parts were painted in the same colourful scheme as the station. El 10 no. 2504 is currently being kept in Grorud and no. 2508 is stationed in Hamar, both old and not in regular use. While the Di 2 no. 839 has been repainted, no. 827 is being kept intact by the Norwegian Railway Club in Hønefoss.

== In other media ==
Bjarne and Max Mekker were included in Children's Television Workshop's 1993 New Year's Eve special, Sesame Street Stays Up Late.
