= Sigvald Tveit =

Norwegian composer and musicologist (1945–2019)

- Born: 14 March 1945; Nissedal, Norway
- Died: 8 January 2019 (aged 73); Oslo, Norway
- Occupations: Composer, musicologist

Sigvald Tveit (14 March 1945 – 8 January 2019) was a Norwegian composer and musicologist.

== Biography ==
Born in Nissedal Municipality, Tveit studied at the University of Oslo and the Norwegian Academy of Music, and was appointed at the University of Oslo from 1972. From 1984 he was associate professor. His compositions include music for the television series Sesam Stasjon and Portveien 2, and other shows. His musical plays include Visst skal våren komme (1983), Det gode landet (1986), Livstreet (1994), and Pilgrimen (1997).

He died in Oslo on 8 January 2019.

== Selected works ==
- Seks religiøse folketoner. Oslo: Norsk Musikforlag. 1983. OCLC 461704167.
- Flere sanger fra Portveien. Eyvind Skeie (lyrics); Eli & Jarl (musical group). Vøyenenge: Fablos. 1986. OCLC 23110552.
- Harmonilære fra en ny innfallsvinkel. Oslo: Universitetsforlaget. 2008. ISBN 9788215012117. OCLC 1028343770.
