= Jarl Goli =

Norwegian actor and television host

- Born: Jarl Einar Goli; 23 April 1957 (age 69); Norway
- Occupations: Painter, former actor
- Children: Aida Celine Goli Dypeng; Gard Løkke
- Website: Jarl Goli Artworks

Jarl Einar Goli (born 23 April 1957) is a Norwegian painter and former actor and television personality.

Goli enrolled at the Norwegian National Academy of Theatre in 1978. He was a stage actor at Den Nationale Scene before appearing on television for the Norwegian Broadcasting Corporation. He quickly made his breakthrough with Eli Rygg in the children's show Portveien 2 in the mid-1980s. In 1985 Goli was awarded the Se og Hør readers' TV personality of the year award. He left Portveien 2 after about 70 episodes, and hosted the 1986 Melodi Grand Prix as well as the radio programs Norsktoppen and Reiseradioen. In the 1990s he appeared on other channels, as host of Super-Quick in 1993 on TV Norge and Våg og vinn in 1997 on TV3. He also had a short time as program director for TV3 in 1995, and was a journalist for the Norwegian Broadcasting Corporation's district branch in Oppland from 1995 to 1996.

His acting career continued with roles in Offshore in 1996, Hotel Cæsar in 2009, Taxi in 2010 and Journey to the Christmas Star in 2012. Filmography include Adjø solidaritet (1985) and Orion's Belt (1987). He has also been a restauranteer and had his own stock company. In 2000 he had a brief tenure as municipal director of culture in Ullensaker. From 2009 to 2010 he tried his luck in the Progress Party in Fet, but he resigned his membership after less than a year.

He started professional painting at the Museo Delso in December 2017. Since 2018, several solo and collective exhibitions in Spain, Norway, Italy, United States (New York) and Germany have been held.

== Painting career (exhibitions, awards and prizes) ==
Many international art Prizes 2018 - 2023. Artisti 22. Italy. Michael Angelo internasjonal artprize. Exhibition Paris 22 with the artprize in Louvre. Donated art to Shirley Stiftelsen Bodø. Nordland Fylkes sykehus. One among 30 selective artist in Artisti 23. 9 - 11.06. 23 in Florence. Italy.

=== 2021 ===
50 Artists to INVEST IN. Guide to investing art. July 2021

AMBASSADOR of ART International Prize - 2021

THE BEST Modern and Contemporary ARTIST - 2021

International Prize David Michelangelo, Italy - January 2021

=== 2020 ===
International Prize Raffaello & Canova, Venice, Italy - 12.12.2020

Selected to be one of 60 artists, presented in the art exhibition "I SEGNALATI", 12 to 18 December, Venice, Italy.

Participation at the BIENNALE DEI NORMANNI, 12 to 18 September 2020, Monreale, Palermo, Italy.

International Prize "Artist of the Year 2020". Painters, sculptors, photographers, video makers, performers, graphic designers, stylists, who have contributed, through their work, to making their art known in the world. The works of the participating artists will be screened from 12 to 18 September 2020 at the G. Sciortino Museum in Monreale.

Selected for inclusion in the book ART UNIVERSAL - the great encyclopedia of international art.

3° International Prize Leonardo da Vinci. The Universal Artist. Firenze, Italy - 25.01.2020

Solo exhibition. Hammerfest, Norway - 10.02.2020

Collective exhibition. Drangeid, Norway - 20.02 til 23.02.2020

=== 2019 ===
Solo exhibition. Moelleparken, Tau Stavanger, Norway - June 2019

ATIM TOP 60 Masters. New York, USA - 26.04. til 5.05.2019

International Prize MICHELANGELO. Rome, Italy - 14.07.2019

Collective exhibition. ST. Petri kirke, Norway. - 21.10. til 24.10.2019

GIOTTO International Prize. Lisboa, Portugal - 21.10.2019

Solo exhibition. Yndestad Gard, Norway - 1.12.2019.

Humanity Imamen Art Prize. Bangkok, Thailand - 12.12.2019

=== 2018 ===
Solo exhibition. Casa Boquera. Yekla, Spain - 16.04.2018

Solo exhibition. Museo Delso. Alfa’z del Pi, Spain - 21.04.2018

Collective exhibition. Kunstschimmer7. Internationale Kunstmesse Ulm, Germany - March 2018

Collective exhibition. Casa cultural. Alfa’z del Pi, Spain 21.10.2018

Collective exhibition. Risoer, Norway - 16.06.2018

Collective exhibition. Modern art Galleri. Trondheim, Norway - 16.08.2018

Solo exhibition. Surnadal Culture House, Norway - 24.08.2018

Collective exhibition. Lions Kjenn school. Norway - 21.09.2018

Awards
Preceded by Kari Storækre and Simon Flem Devold	Se og Hør's TV Personality of the Year; 1985 (with Gunvor Hals)	Succeeded by Dan Børge Akerø
