= SJ U =

Swedish electric shunting locomotives

U
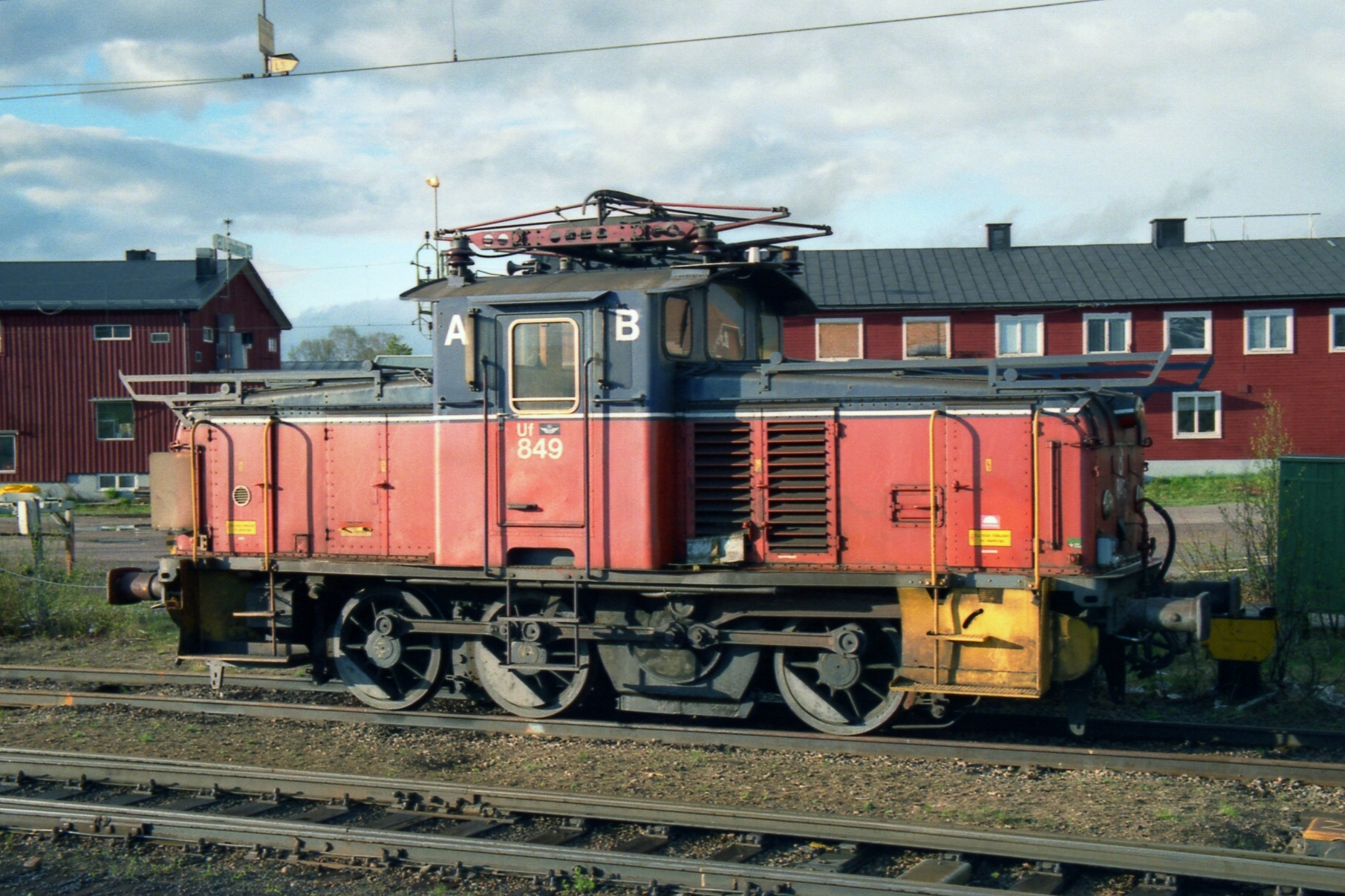
- Uf 849 in 2000
Type and origin
- Power type: Electric
- Builder: ASEA; Nyqvist och Holm; Motala; ASJ Falun; Thune
- Build date: 1929–1956
- Total produced: 152
Specifications
- Configuration
  - UIC: Co'
- Gauge: 1,435 mm (4 ft 8 1/2 in)
- Length: 9,600 mm (31 ft 6 in)
- Loco weight: 47.4 tonnes (46.7 long tons; 52.2 short tons) (Ub, Ue); 49.2 tonnes (48.4 long tons; 54.2 short tons) (Uc); 50.4 tonnes (49.6 long tons; 55.6 short tons) (Ud, Uf)
- Electric system/s: 15 kV 16 2/3 Hz AC Catenary
- Current pickup: Pantograph
Performance figures
- Maximum speed: 45 km/h (28 mph) (Ua, Ub, Uc, Ue); 60 km/h (37 mph) (Ud, Uf)
- Power output: 610 kW (820 hp) (Ua, Ub, Uc, Ud); 920 kW (1,230 hp) (Ue, Uf)

U is a class of 152 electric shunter locomotives operated by the Swedish State Railways (Swedish: Statens Järnvägar, SJ) and Trafikaktiebolaget Grängesberg–Oxelösunds Järnvägar (TGOJ) of Sweden, and the Norwegian State Railways (NSB), LKAB and Norsk Jernverk of Norway. They were built by ASEA, Nyqvist och Holm, Motala, ASJ Falun and Thune between 1926 and 1956. NSB gave the class the designation El 10.

== History ==
=== Swedish State Railways ===
During the 1920s the Swedish State Railways started a program to electrify parts of their network. This caused a need for electric shunters on the West Main Line. A procurement was attempted from Switzerland, but no order was ever made. With the order of the D Class locomotives, SJ decided to order a shunter built with the same components. The initial order was for three Ua-locomotives to be built in 1926 with delivery the following year. The motors were built by ASEA while the mechanical components were built by Nydqvist och Holm (NOHAB). The locomotives worked well, but had problems with the sight from the cab in one direction, so further models were built with a center cab. The Ub series was built by both NOHAB and ASJ Falun. The first delivery was ordered in 1929, and from 1930 to 1950, 90 units were delivered. From 1942 some of the units were also built by Motala. The proved highly economic, as they could replace expensive steam locomotives for shunting. In 1933, a single battery version was delivered, and given the designation Uc. The final batch of 25 units was ordered in 1954 and delivered 1955 and 1956. The Motala-built units had a different configuration with a higher maximum speed and were designated Ud.

During the 1980s SJ started a program to upgrade the class, with the main improvement being the installation of a new, more powerful motor. From 1987 to 1991, Sixty Ub and sixteen Ud were rebuilt and given the designation Ue and Uf, respectively. The first rebuilt unit was painted gray, but all later units were instead painted orange after complaints from the employees. During the 1990s, the need for shunters decreased and the units started to become unreliable, so SJ began withdrawing the non-upgraded units. SJ also started selling upgraded units to private operators. The last units were taken out of service in 2006.

=== LKAB ===
LKAB ordered 15 shunters for use at Narvik Port in Norway, of which 13 were delivered in 1931 and 1932, and two were delivered in 1937. These were built in Norway by Thune, with the electrical equipment supplied by ASEA, and numbered 22 through 35. Seven units became casualties after Narvik was bombed in 1940; two were scrapped and five were sent to ASEA to be reconstructed. After the repairs in 1942, the remained leased to Swedish operators until 1945, when they returned to Narvik. LKAB had a declining need for shunters due to improvement of the unloading of the ore trains in Narvik, and three units were sold to NSB in 1959. By 1984, there was no more need for the units, and the limited shunting was instead done by a few diesel shunters. One of the units is preserved at the city museum.

=== Norwegian State Railways ===
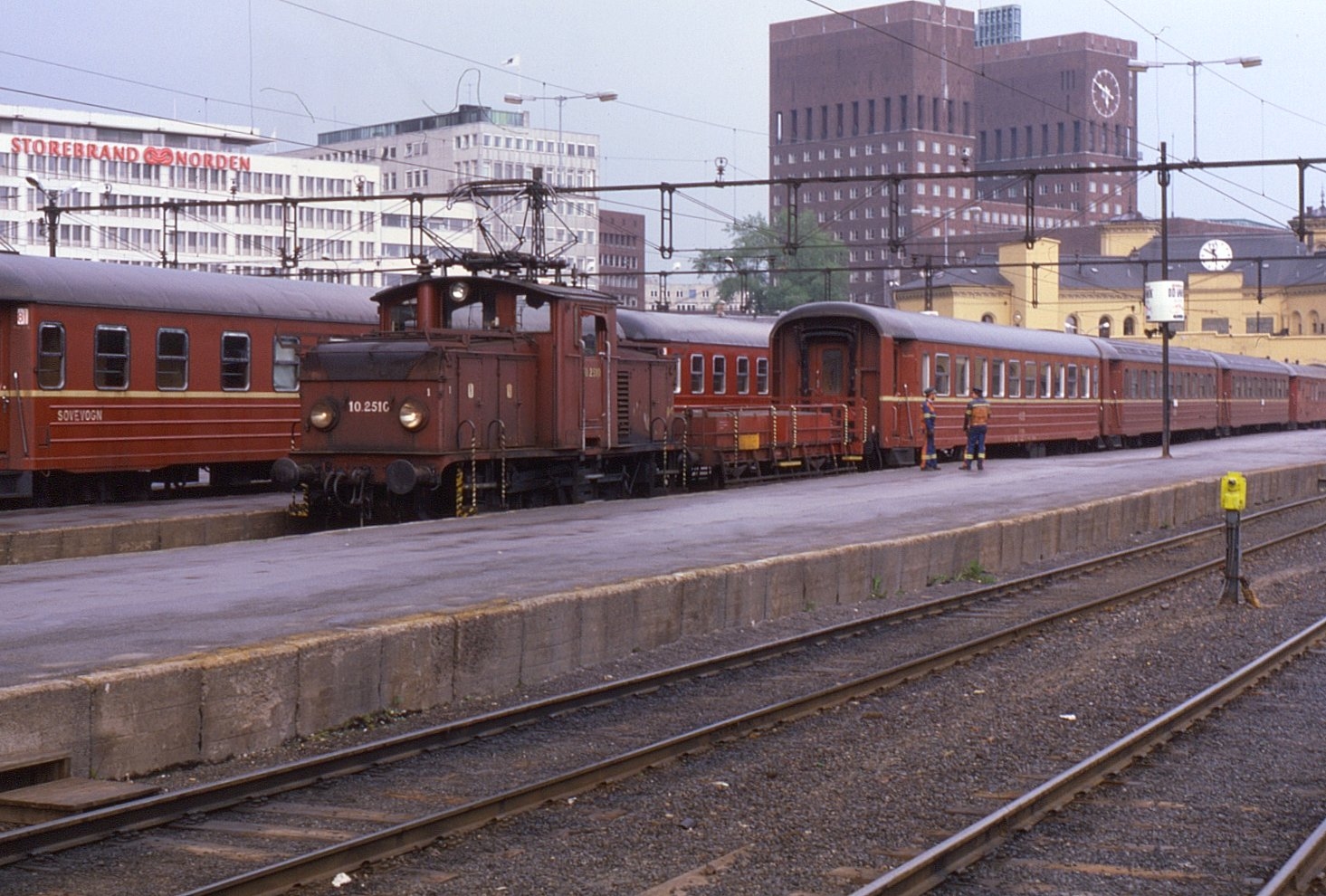
NSB El 10.2510 shunting at Oslo West Station in 1989

The Norwegian State Railways was also in need of electric shunters, and ordered 13 locomotives from ASJ with delivery from 1949 to 1952. The first five units were numbered 2073–77, but these were quickly renumbered, and the whole series was numbered 2504–2516. The units was mostly used at the yards in Oslo and Drammen, as well as some other places in Eastern Norway. From 1953 to the 1960s, one unit was stationed in Kristiansand. From 1960, one unit was stationed in Hamar. They have only exceptionally been used for mainline haulage, most notably during the 1970s for some freight trains from Lillestrøm to Skarnes and from Oslo to Sandvika and Spikkestad. The locomotives have also been used to haul passenger trains on the Horten Line branch. The first removal of units was made in 1983. After 1985, a limited number of units received NSB's new yellow and red livery for shunting locomotives. In the late 1980s, no. 2504 was repainted in an array of colors and became the haulage for the train in the children's television series Sesam Stasjon. In 1995, 2508 took over this job and 2504 was retired. The class was taken out of service mostly during the 1980s; by 1992 only three units were still in use and after 1995, only 2508 was still in use. It was retired and moved to the Norwegian Railway Museum in 1999, after the series ended.

=== Trafikaktiebolaget Grängesberg-Oxelösunds Järnvägar ===
TGOJ bought five units that were delivered between 1950 and 1954 and numbered 501–505.

=== Norsk Jernverk ===
Norsk Jernverk ordered three units for their railway, with delivery in 1952. This was three years before the line opened, and the units were leased to NSB, where they had the numbers 2326–2328. In 1955, Norsk Jernverk decided that one unit would be sufficient, and 2328 was sold to NSB and renumbered 2517. Norsk Jernverk gave its units the names Lars and Ulv. During the early 1980s, three NSB units were sold to Norsk Jernverk. The five units remained in service until 1988, when the electrical rail transport was terminated. Lars has been preserved by the company.

== Specifications ==
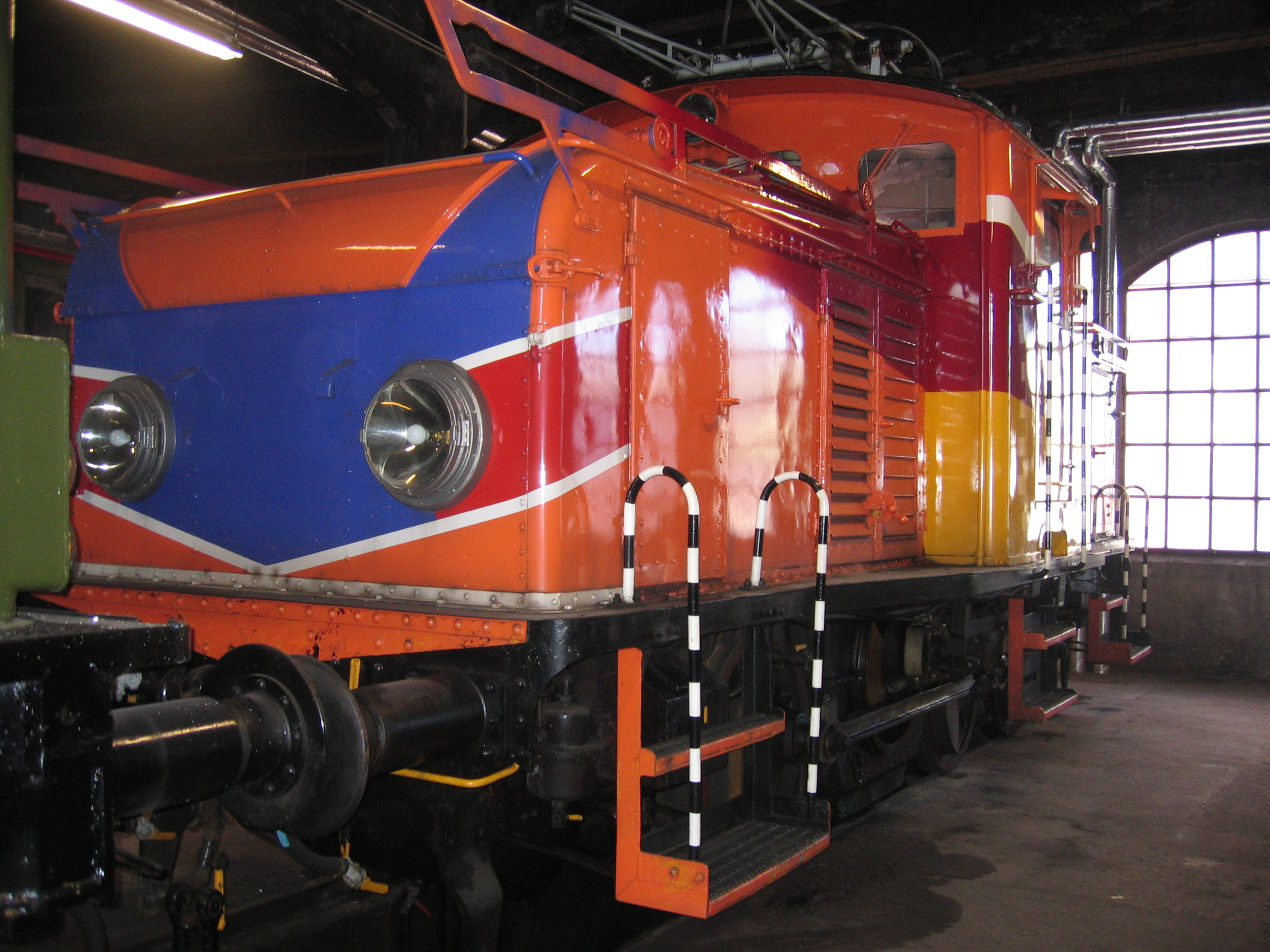
The preserved NSB El 10 in the livery of Sesam Stasjon

The Ua has a cab at one end and was dimensioned to haul a 600 tonnes (590 long tons; 660 short tons) train 45 kilometres per hour (28 mph). It had a power output of 515 kilowatts (691 hp), as did all the Ua through Ud. The other units were 0.9 tonnes (0.89 long tons; 0.99 short tons) heavier due to the center cab. The upgraded Ue and Uf units received a new motor, and have a power output of 920 kilowatts (1,230 hp). The top speed of all but the Ud and Uf is 45 kilometres per hour (28 mph), while it is 60 kilometres per hour (37 mph) for the Ud and Uf. All units had a C wheel arrangement with three powered axles from a shaft. They were 9.600 metres (31 ft 6.0 in) long, except a single unit for NSB that was 11.600 metres (38 ft 0.7 in) long. The units weighed 46.5 tonnes (45.8 long tons; 51.3 short tons) (Ua), 47.4 tonnes (46.7 long tons; 52.2 short tons) (Ub and Ue), 49.2 tonnes (48.4 long tons; 54.2 short tons) (Uc) and 50.4 tonnes (49.6 long tons; 55.6 short tons) (Ud and Uf). The units exported to Norway and sold to TGOJ had the same specifications as Ub.
