= Knut Bjørnsen =

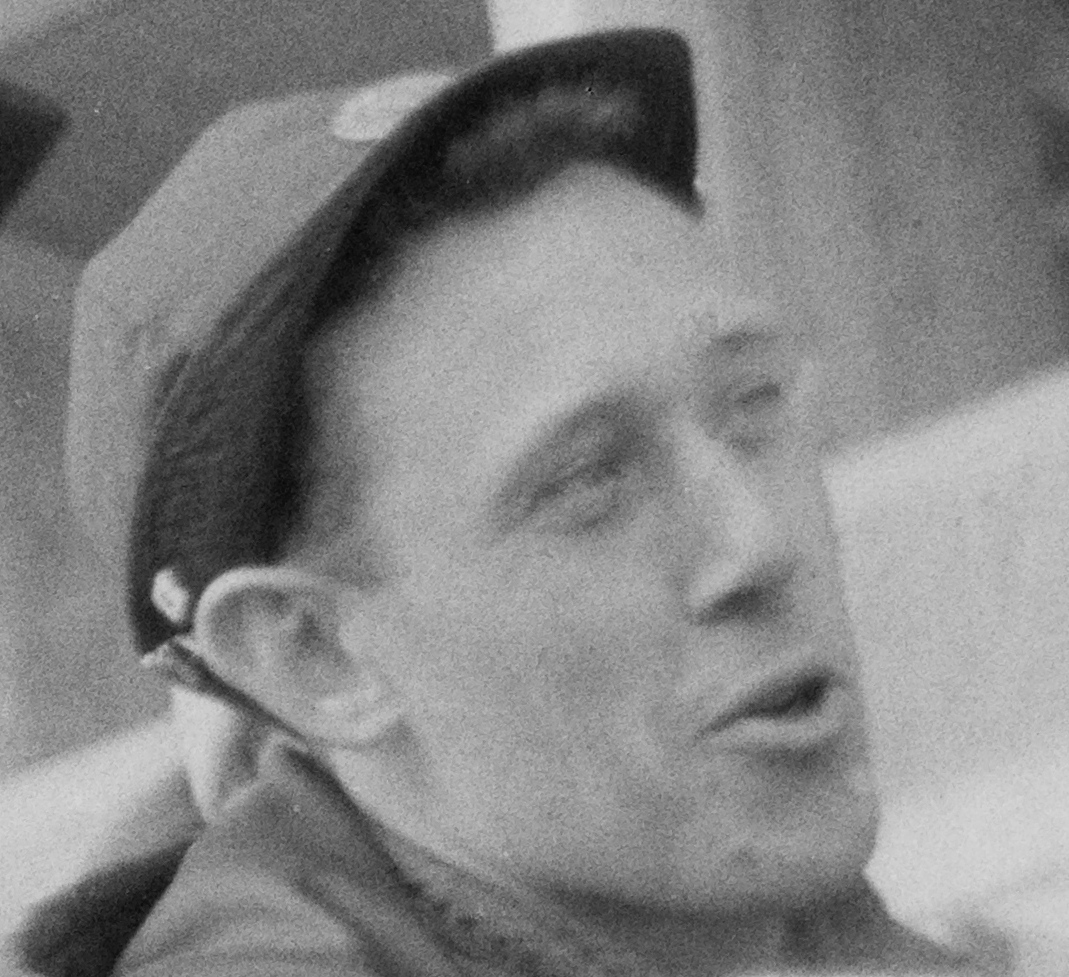
- Born: 26 July 1932; Oslo, Norway
- Died: 14 November 2008 (aged 76); Svelvik, Norway
- Occupations: Sports commentator (1961–1991), Journalist (1954–2008), Television host (1966–1994)
- Spouse(s): Karin Bjørnsen, since 1988

Knut Bjørnsen (26 July 1932 – 14 November 2008) was a sports commentator and journalist for the Norwegian Broadcasting Corporation.

In his youth, Bjørnsen was a promising speed skater. He was junior Norwegian champion in 1951. He worked for the Norwegian Broadcasting Corporation between 1961 and 1991, and was NRK's main commentator for speed skating most of those years, together with fellow NRK veteran journalist Per Jorsett. He also hosted the popular Norwegian Broadcasting Corporation game show Kvitt eller dobbelt ("Double or Nothing") for many years. In 1991, Bjørnsen left the Norwegian Broadcasting Corporation, and began working for cable channel TV3, where he hosted the game show Lykkehjulet (a Norwegian adaptation of Wheel of Fortune).

In his later years, he spoke out as a supporter of the Progress Party, having lost his confidence in the Conservative Party.

In April 2008, Bjørnsen was diagnosed with terminal pancreatic cancer, and he died from the illness seven months later, on 14 November 2008.

Awards
Preceded by Halvor Kleppen	Se og Hør's TV Personality of the Year; 1983	Succeeded by Kari Storækre and Simon Flem Devold
