= Kari Storækre =

Norwegian television personality (born 1950)

Kari Storækre (born 22 June 1950) is a Norwegian television personality.

== Biography ==
She grew up in Stavanger as a daughter of Jon and Ulla Storækre. She was married to Arne Treholt from 1977 to 1985, until he was thoroughly scandalized in an espionage case. In 1987 she married her colleague, the Swede Åke Wilhelmsson.

In her early career, she worked as a journalist in Arbeiderbladet and Verdens Gang. From 1978 into the early 1980s she hosted the talk show Unnskyld at jeg spør together with different hosts, with Frantz Saksvik being a mainstay. In 1983, she hosted an informational series on computer technology named Datahverdag. When Arne Treholt was arrested in 1984, there were talks about removing Storækre from the air, but she was allowed to continue. In the same year, she was awarded the Se og Hør readers' TV personality of the year award.

As discovered by the Lund Commission, Storækre was subject to secret police surveillance. The prolonged Treholt case took its toll and she migrated to Sweden where she worked with television, among others the breakfast show God morgen, Skandinavia. She later moved back to Norway. She has written the books God tur til Paris (1985) and I søkelyset (1993); both have been translated to Swedish.

Awards
Preceded by Knut Bjørnsen	Se og Hør's TV Personality of the Year; 1984 (with Simon Flem Devold)	Succeeded by Jarl Goli and Gunvor Hals
