= Switcher locomotive =

Locomotive used in yards for assembling trains

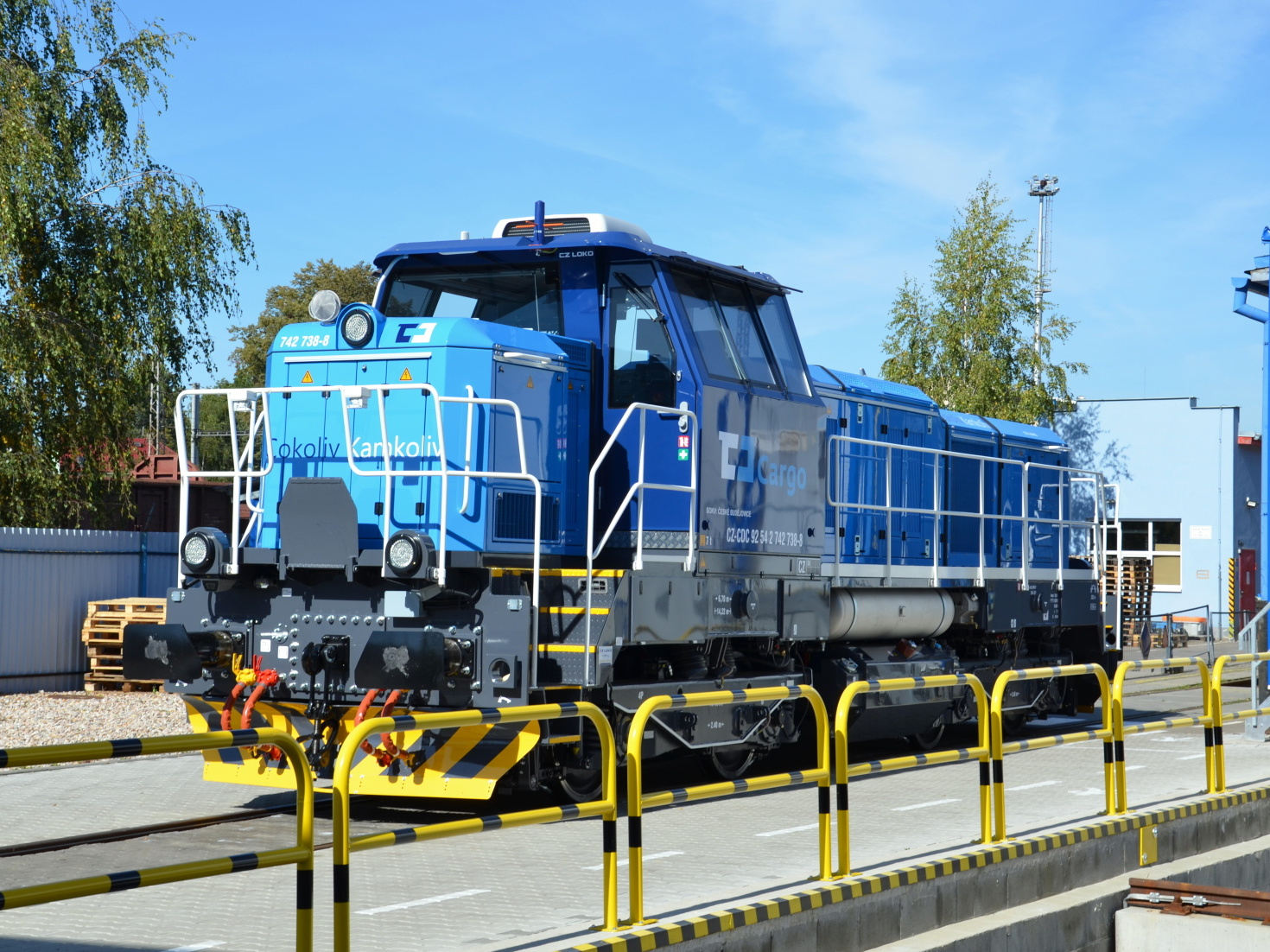
CZ Loko Effishunter

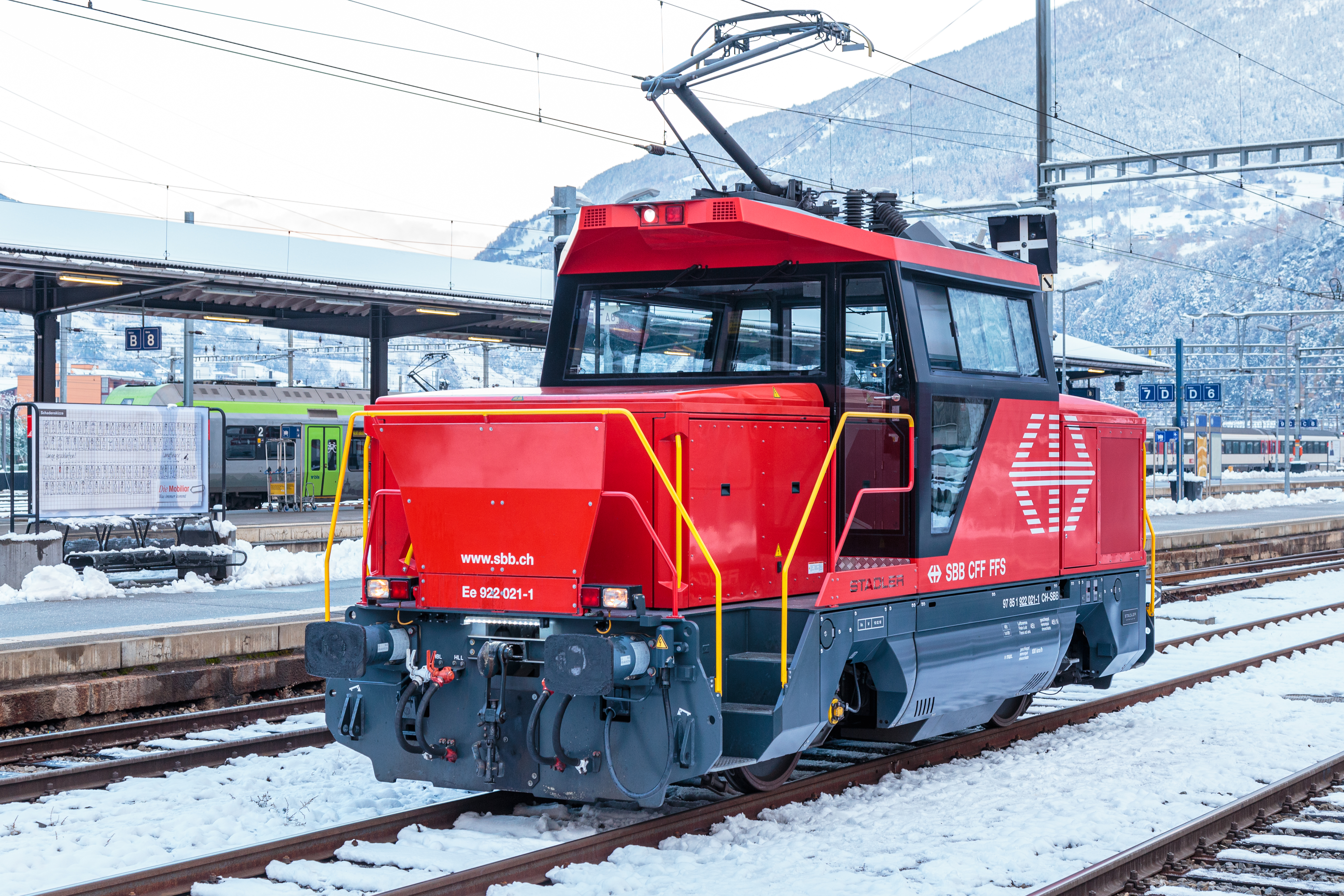
Stadler Rail Ee 922

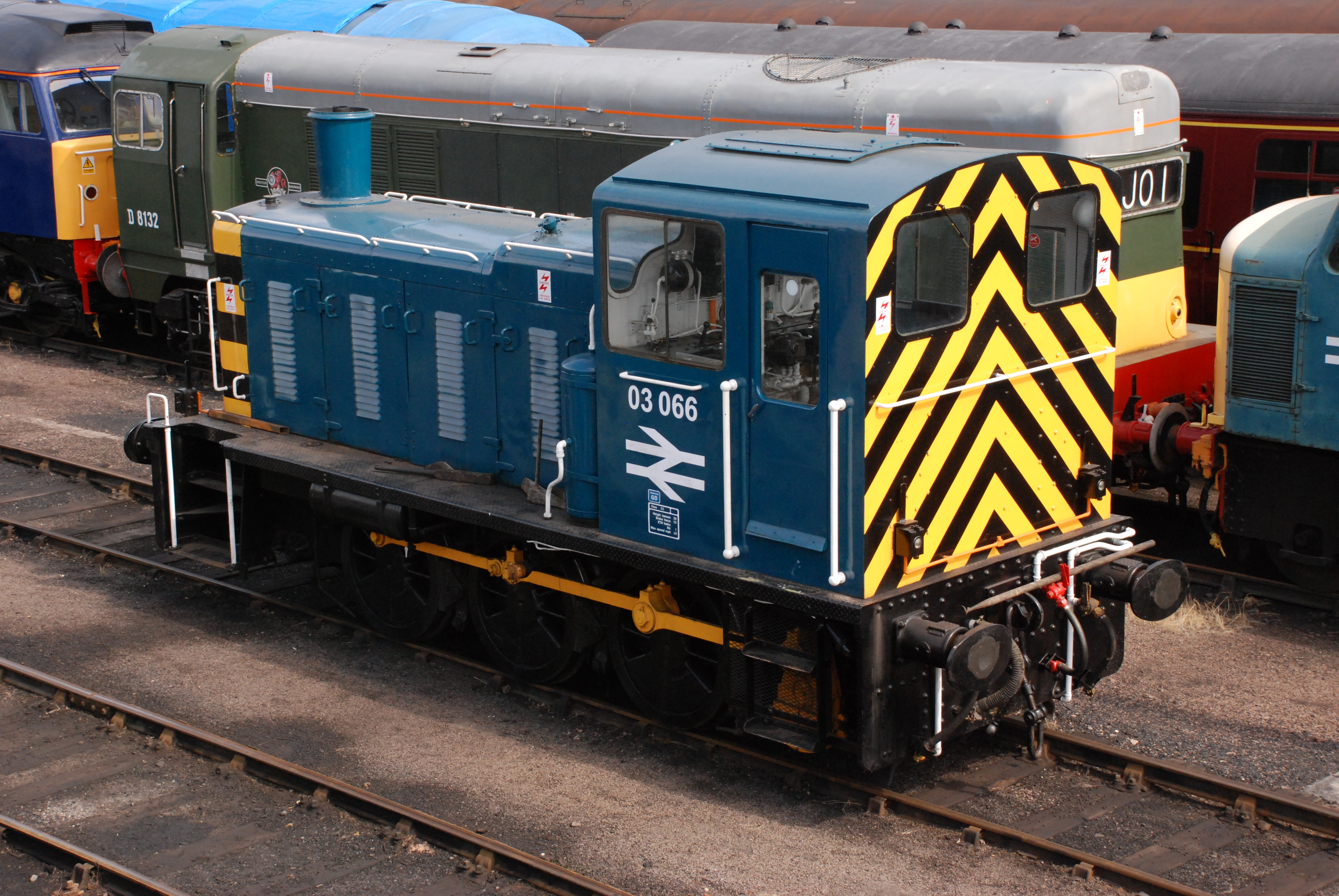
British Rail Class 03

A switcher locomotive (American English), shunter locomotive (British English), station pilot (British English), or shifter locomotive (Pennsylvania Railroad terminology) is a locomotive used for maneuvering railway vehicles over short distances. Switchers do not typically move trains over long distances. Instead, they assemble trains in order for another locomotive to take over. Switchers often operate in a railyard or make short transfer runs. They may serve as the primary motive power on short branch lines or switching and terminal railroads. A hybrid type known as a road switcher can both shunt and haul trains. Switching locomotives may be purpose-built engines, but may also be downgraded main-line engines, or simply main-line engines assigned to switching. Switchers can also be used on short excursion train rides.

Switchers are optimized for their role, being relatively low-powered but with a high starting tractive effort for getting heavy cars rolling quickly. Switchers are geared to produce high torque but are restricted to low top speeds and have small diameter driving wheels. Switchers are also strategically designed to be durable, extending their service periods, such as the Swedish class U.

American, Russian, Indian and Chinese switchers tend to be larger, with bogies to allow them to be used on tight radiuses. Western European shunters tend to be smaller and more often have fixed axles. They also often maintain coupling rods for longer than other locomotive types, although bogie types have long been used where very heavy loads are involved, such as at steelworks.

== Etymology ==
A switcher may also be called a yard pilot, switch engine, or yard goat. Other common terms are shunter, shifter, or station pilot.

These terms can also be used to describe workers operating these engines or engaged in directing shunting operations.

== Power types ==
=== Diesel ===
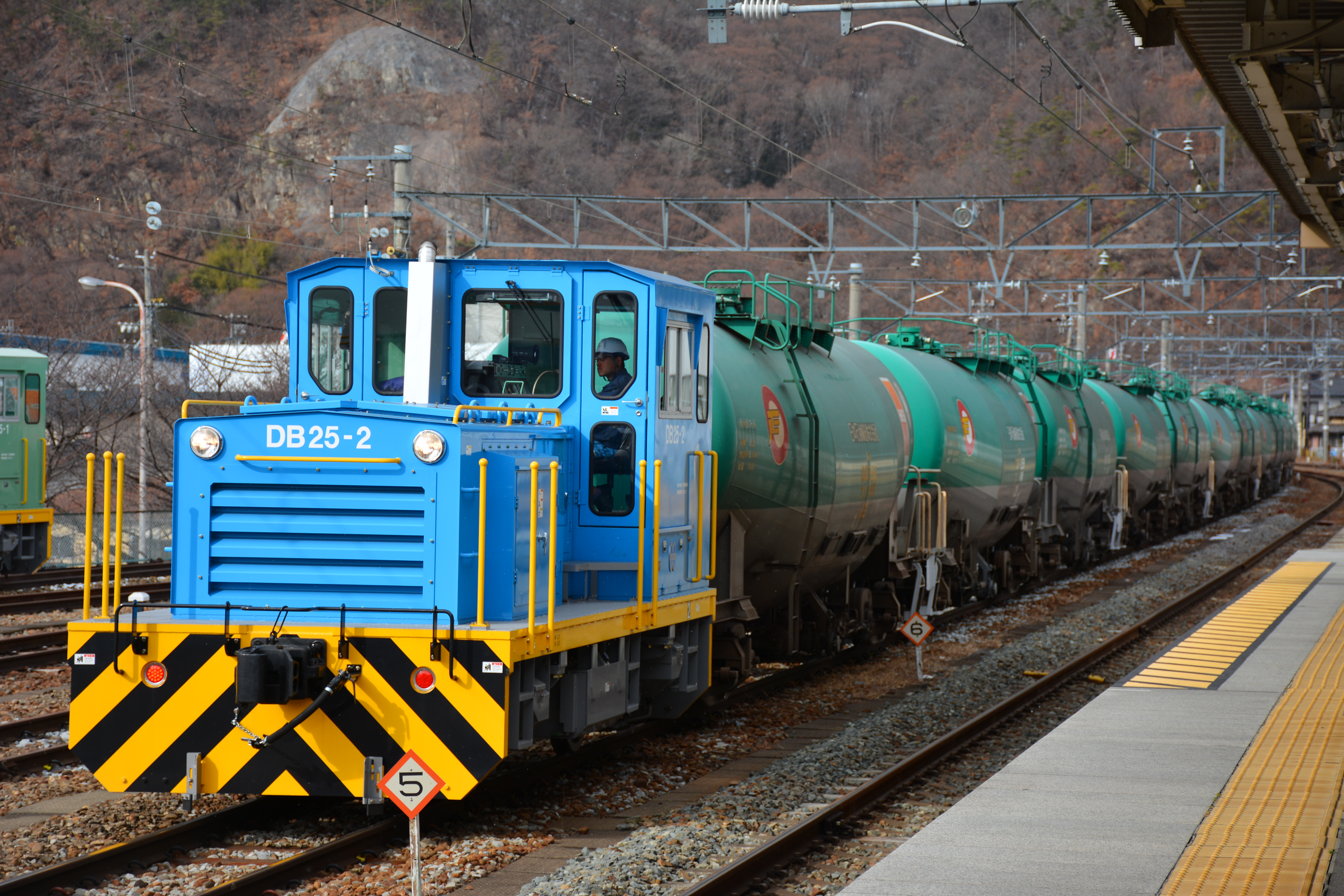
A diesel switcher in Sakaki, Japan

Diesel switchers tend to have a high cab and often lower and/or narrower hoods (bonnets) containing the diesel engines, for all round visibility. Slugs are often used because they allow even greater tractive effort to be applied. Nearly all slugs used for switching are of the low hood, cabless variety. Good visibility in both directions is critical, because a switcher may be running in either direction; turning the locomotive is time-consuming. Some earlier diesel switchers used cow–calf configurations of two powered units in order to provide greater power.

Modern diesel switchers are usually diesel-electric locomotives.

=== Electric ===
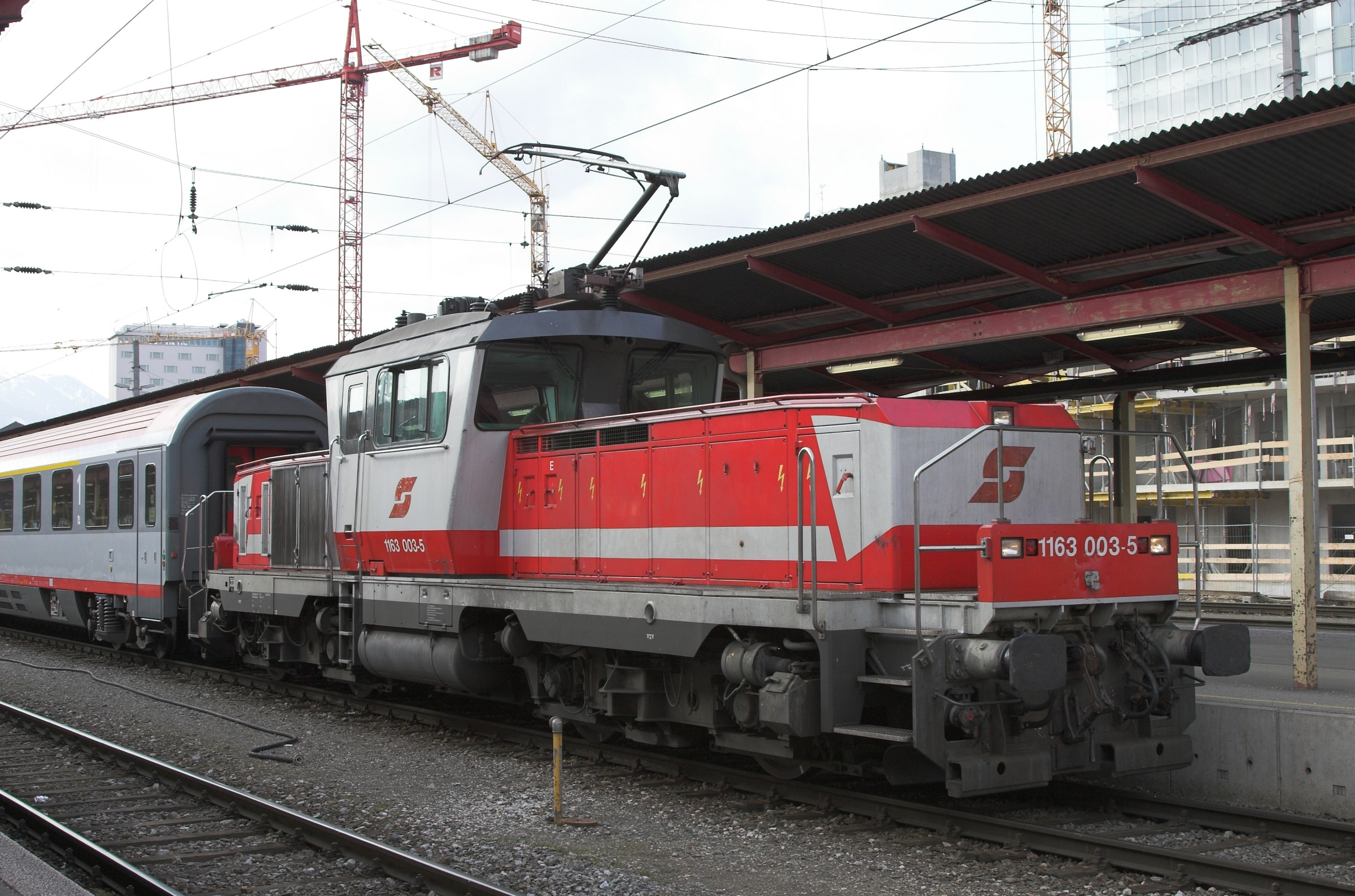
An electric switcher in Salzburg, Austria

The majority of modern switchers are diesels, but countries with near-total electrification, like Switzerland, use electric switchers. Prior to the introduction of diesel-electric locomotives, electric shunting locomotives were used to an extent in Great Britain where heavy trains needed to be started on steep gradients. The steeply-graded Quayside Branch in Newcastle upon Tyne was electrified by the North Eastern Railway in 1905, and two steeplecab locomotives were built to handle all traffic on the line. One of these, No. 1, is now part of the National Collection and resides at Locomotion in Shildon. On the opposite side of the Tyne, the electrified lines owned by the Harton Coal Company in South Shields for the movement of coal and colliery waste to shipping facilities on the river was one of the more extensive industrial networks. A number of the early German locomotives built for use on these lines have been preserved.

Electric locomotives were also extensively employed for moving the coke cars at cokeworks, obtaining power from a side wire, as third rail or overhead line electrification would have been impractical. These specialised locomotives were tall steeple-cab types not seen anywhere else, and operated on a short length of track between the ovens and the quenching tower. Despite their ubiquity, very few have survived into preservation as there is very little scope of operating them due to their unique means of obtaining power, slow speed and the fact they greatly exceed the loading gauge of most railway lines. One example built by Greenwood and Batley in Armley, Leeds is preserved at the Middleton Railway, not far from where it was built.

Small industrial shunters are sometimes battery powered type. An early battery-powered shunting locomotive is shown here. The Tyne and Wear Metro has three battery electric shunters built by Hunslet, which are used to haul engineering trains when the overhead supply is switched off. New Zealand Railways imported and manufactured locally battery-electric shunters in the 1920s: the EB class and the E class (1922)

=== Electro-diesel ===
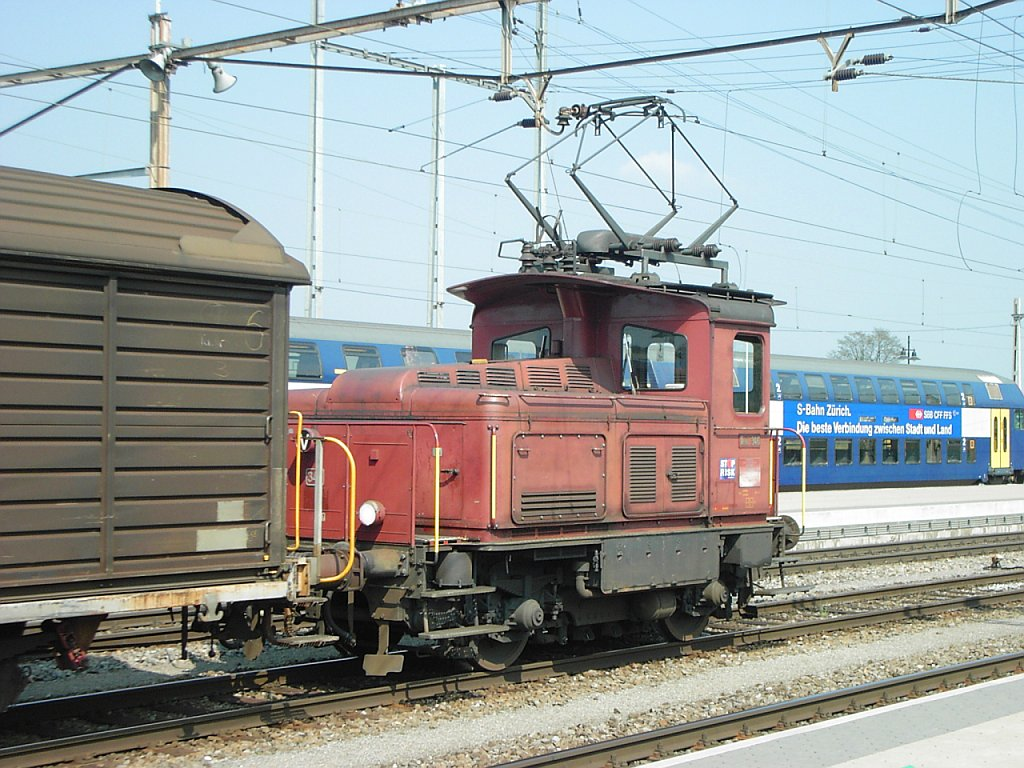
A small electro-diesel switcher in Pfäffikon, Switzerland

Some switchers are electro-diesel, and hence can be powered from onboard diesel engines, or from an external electricity supply.

=== Steam ===
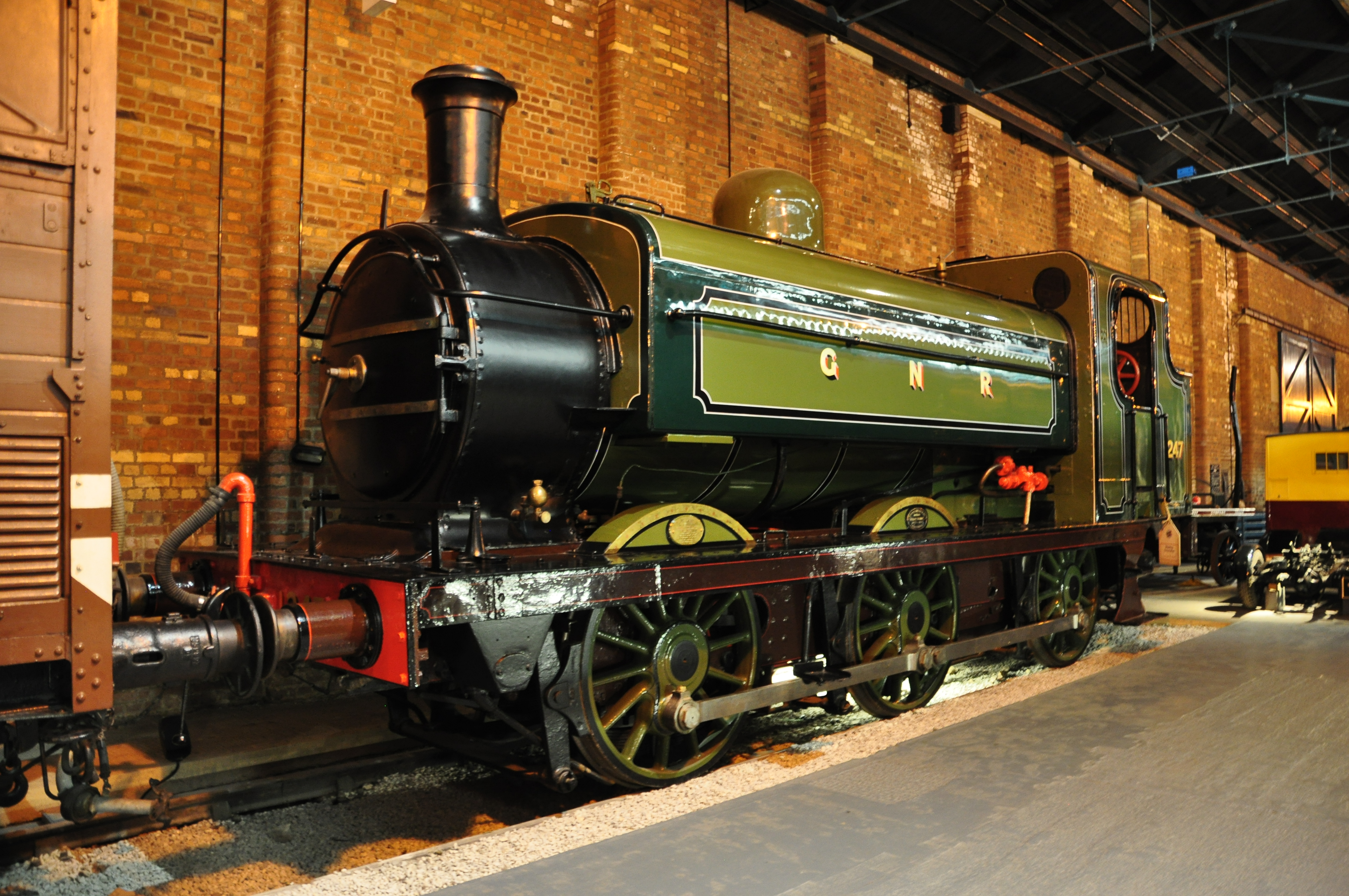
A typical British steam shunter, a GNR Class J13

Steam shunter/switchers are now mostly out of service. Steam switchers were either tank locomotives or had special (smaller) tenders, with narrow coal bunkers and/or sloped tender decks to increase rearward visibility. Headlights, where carried, were mounted on both ends. Most were either side-tank or saddle-tank types, however in the usual departure from its neighbours' practice, the Great Western Railway used pannier tanks for shunting and branch line work, a practice which the Western Region of BR perpetuated until steam traction was phased out, with several examples joining a 9F as banking engines to assist locomotives on the notoriously arduous ascent of the Lickey Incline, replacing the LMS "Jinties" which had formerly carried out the task alongside "Big Bertha".

As diesel shunters began to appear in ever-increasing numbers, attempts were made by companies such as Sentinel to adapt the vertical boilers from their steam powered road vehicles for use in shunting locomotives, in order to compete with the newcomers. Although these were found to be equal in power and efficiency to most of the early diesel designs, their development came too late to have any real impact. Outwardly, they bear more resemblance to diesels than steam locomotives. A number have been preserved on heritage railways, although few of these are in working order, being designed very specifically for shunting work and lacking the necessary speed to travel any kind of distance.

Small industrial shunters have sometimes been fireless locomotives and a few of these are still at work in Germany. Again, several have been preserved, but are mostly static displays, as heritage railways and museums lack the large source of high-pressure steam (such as a power station's boilers) needed to charge the locomotive's accumulator.

== By region ==
=== United States ===
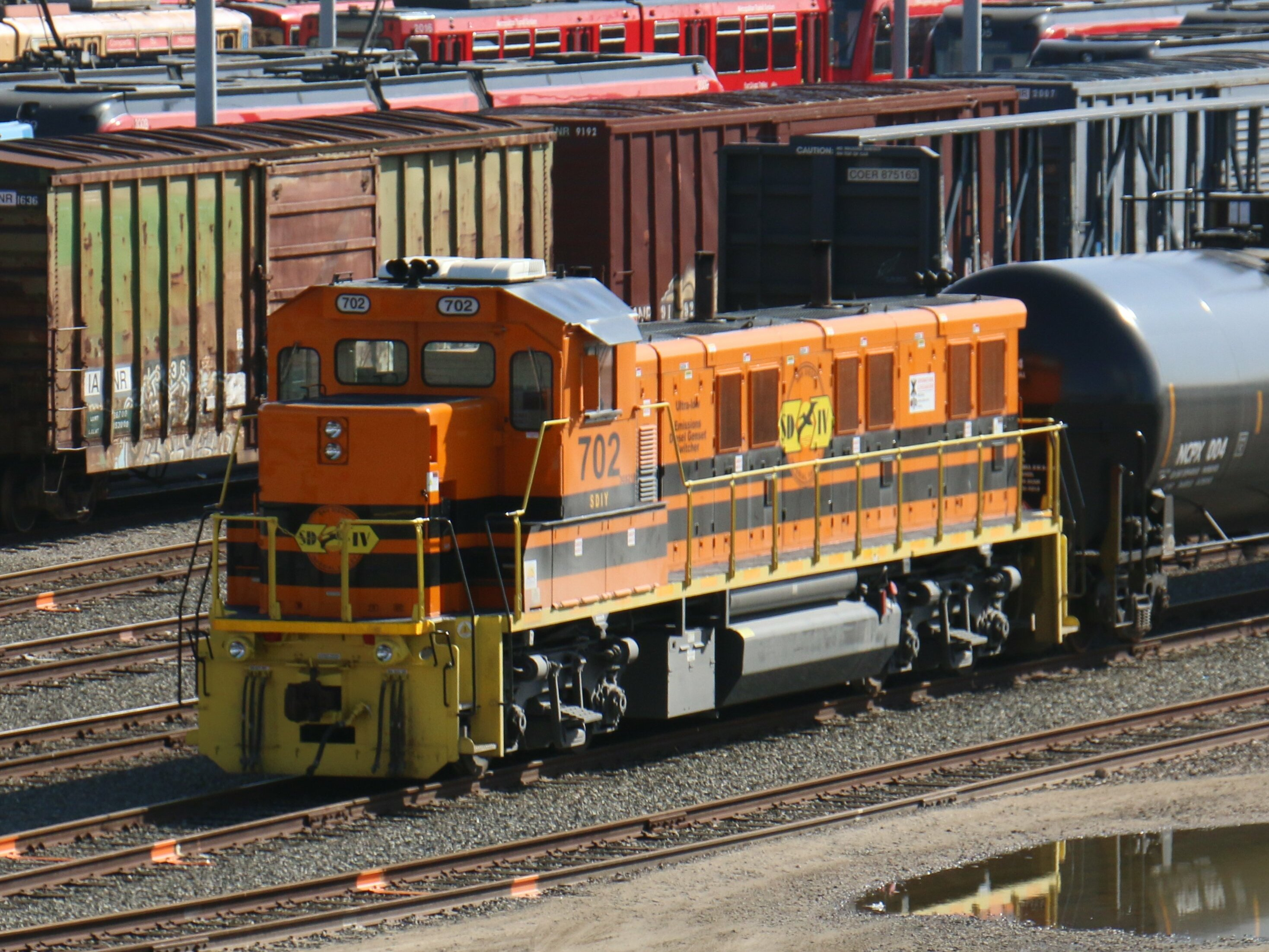
A modern NRE Genset switcher on the American San Diego and Imperial Valley Railroad

American switchers tend to be larger, and are almost always powered by diesel.

Most American switchers are actually road switchers, which are larger and have greater power output, to be used on mainlines.

=== Great Britain ===
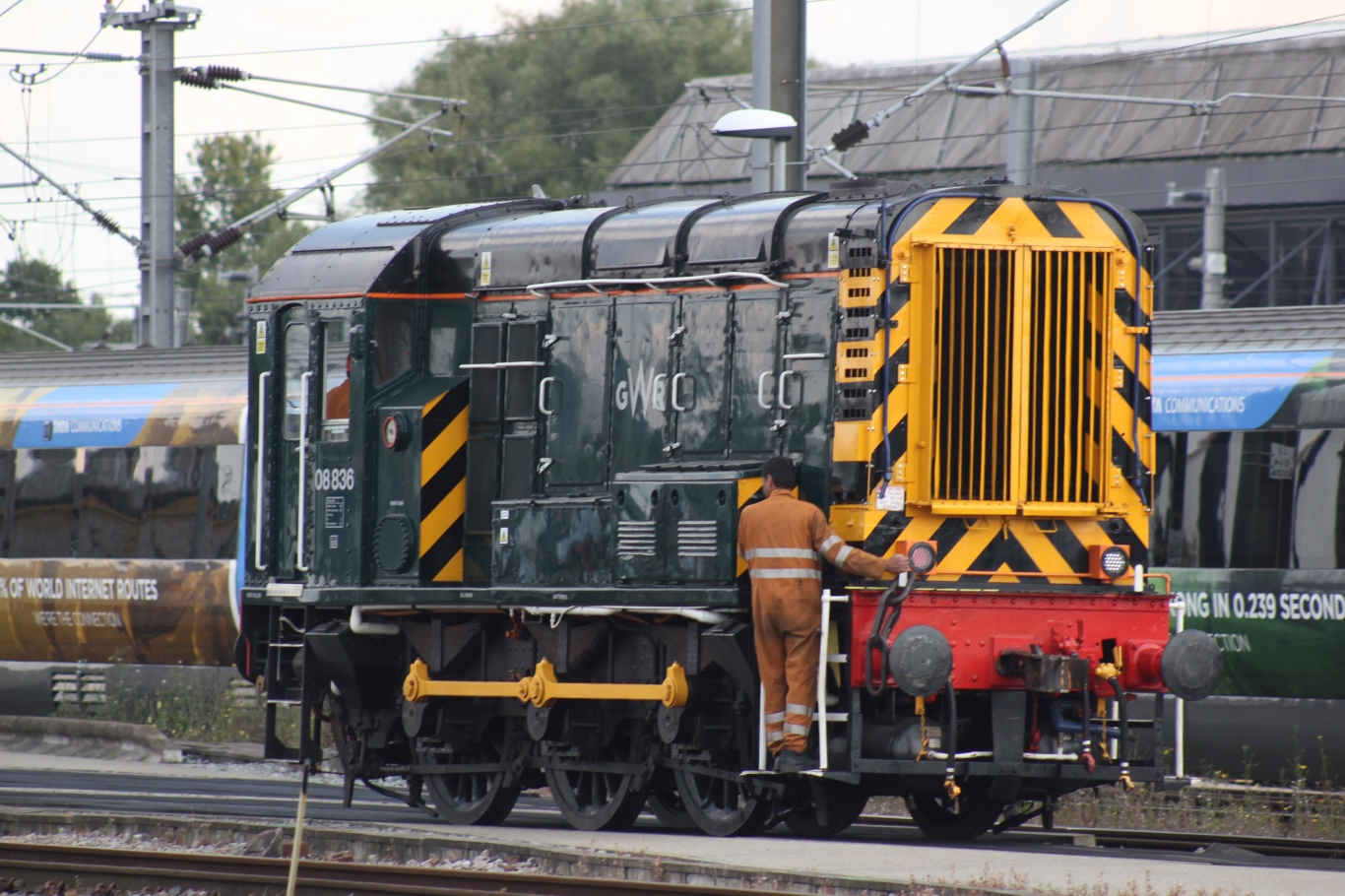
The British Rail Class 08 is a widely used shunter in Great Britain

British shunters are much smaller than those used in the United States. Current British shunters are 0-6-0 diesel-electrics, Class 08 and Class 09, of 350-400 horsepower. These were developed from similar locomotives supplied by the English Electric Company to the Big Four British railway companies in the 1930s and 1940s, e.g. those pioneered by the LMS. Similar locomotives were exported to the Netherlands (e.g. NS Class 600) and Australia (e.g. Victorian Railways F class (diesel)). The use of shunting locomotives saw a sharp decline in Britain in the latter half of the 20th century, largely due to the contraction of the network, increased competition from road traffic and widespread adoption of train-load freight, with fixed rakes of wagons moving mainly bulk products between rapid-loading facilities, as opposed to thousands of sidings and goods depots feeding trains of assorted wagons into the marshalling yards.

=== Continental Europe ===
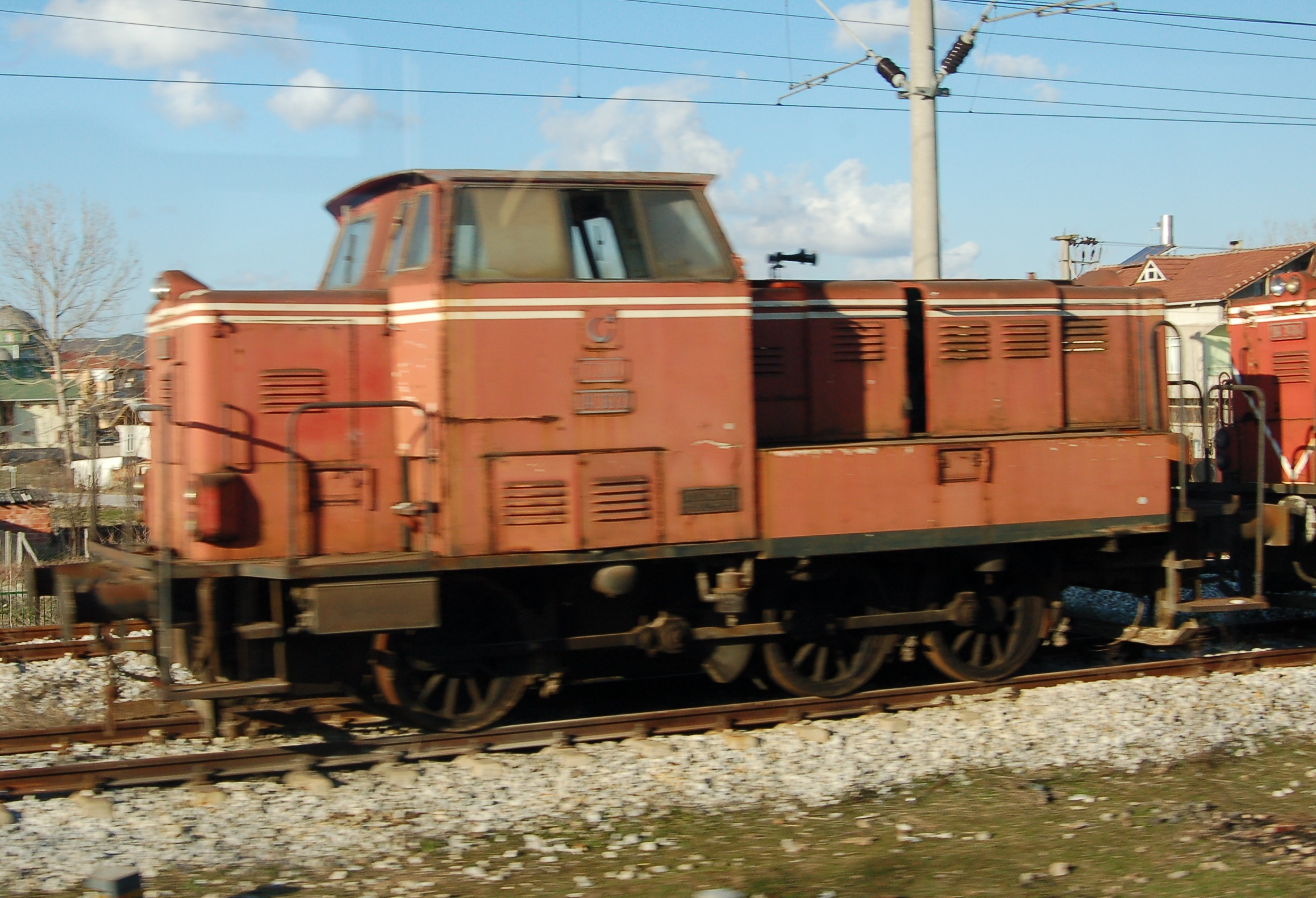
A TCDD DH33100 shunter in Istanbul, Turkey

In continental Europe 0-6-0 (or "C") diesel-hydraulics, similar to the short-lived British Rail Class 14, are widely used. A very common type is the DB Class V 60 and its variants. For lightweight shunting of single wagons or short trains, two-axle shunters are common; in Germany these are known as Kleinlokomotive (small locomotive).

== See also ==
- Road switcher
- Road-rail vehicle
- Railcar mover
