= TCDD DH33100 =

Class of 38 Turkish diesel-hydraulic locomotives

DH33100
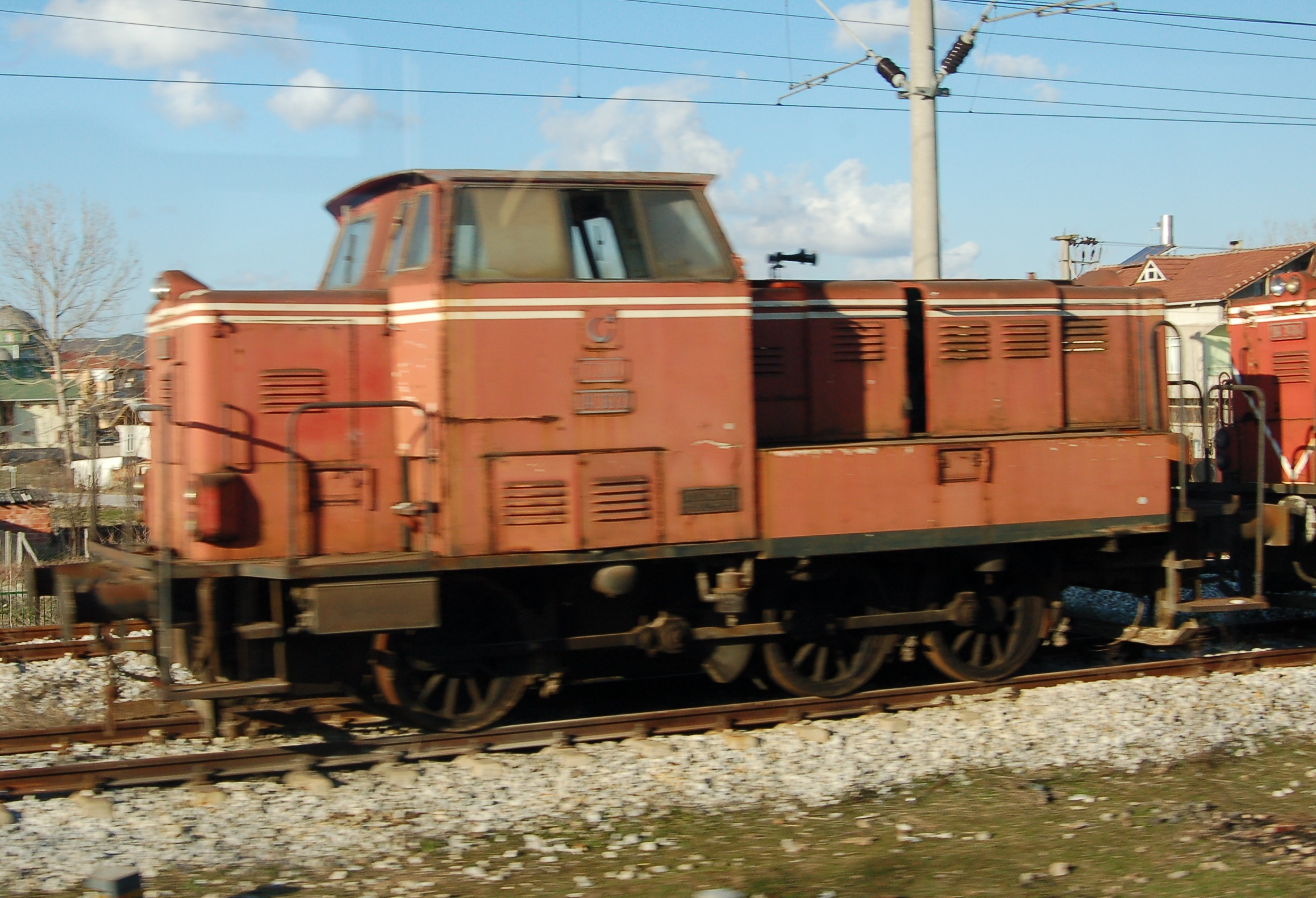
- TCDD DH33121 shunter in Istanbul, Turkey. February 24, 2008
Type and origin
- Power type: Diesel-hydraulic
- Builder: Maschinenbau Kiel (MaK), TCDD
- Build date: 1953–1954
- Total produced: 38
Specifications
- Configuration
  - Whyte: 0-6-0DH
  - UIC: C
- Gauge: 1,435 mm (4 ft 8 1/2 in)
- Length: 9.2 m (30 ft 2 in)
- Loco weight: 32.5 tonnes (32.0 long tons; 35.8 short tons)
- Prime mover: KT1150L
- Cylinders: V12
Performance figures
- Power output: 260 kW (350 hp) (33 units); 360 kW (480 hp) (5 units)
Career
- Operators: Turkish State Railways
- Numbers: DH33101 – DH33138

TCDD DH33100 were diesel-hydraulic locomotive built for shunting operations on the Turkish State Railways. 38 units from Maschinenbau Kiel (MaK) were built starting in 1953 and another 24 were built by TCDD in Turkey. In 1980–1981 the shunters were rebuilt with Cummins Diesel KT1150L engines.
