= Gard Løkke =

Norwegian actor (born 1999)

- Born: Gard Fartein Løkke Goli; 1 October 1999 (age 26); Lillehammer, Norway
- Occupation: Actor
- Father: Jarl Goli

Gard Fartein Løkke Goli (born 1 October 1999) is a Norwegian actor

== Life and career ==
Løkke was born 1 October 1999 in Lillehammer. His father Jarl Goli is also an actor. In 2023, he enrolled at the Oslo National Academy of the Arts to study theatre.

He made his acting debut in the film De tøffeste gutta (2013), and has later starred in several television series and played the lead role in the feature film Good Boy (2022). In 2025, he played the character Bo in the third season of the TV series Hjem til jul.
