= To Freddy =

- Directed by: Viljar Bøe
- Written by: Viljar Bøe
- Produced by: Mikkel Dueholm Danekilde; Karl Oskar Åsli
- Starring: Nicolai Narvesen Lied; Viljar Bøe; Simen Stensheim Jørgensen; Nicholas Vedi; Peter Emong
- Edited by: Viljar Bøe
- Release date: 13 August 2020 (Canal de Panama International Film Festival)
- Running time: 72 minutes
- Country: Norway
- Languages: Norwegian; English

To Freddy (Norwegian: Til Freddy) is a 2020 Norwegian thriller film directed by Viljar Bøe, starring Nicolai Narvesen Lied, Bøe, Simen Stensheim Jørgensen, Nicholas Vedi and Peter Emong.

== Cast ==
- Nicolai Narvesen Lied as Freddy
- Viljar Bøe as Viljar
- Simen Stensheim Jørgensen as Simen
- Nicholas Vedi as Nicholas
- Peter Emong as Peter

== Reception ==
Christine Burnham of PopHorror called the film "tense" and "brilliantly acted".

Madeleine Koestner of Rue Morgue wrote that the film "paves the road for an excellent deep conversation."

Daniel Baldwin of Dread Central rated the film 3 stars out of 5 and wrote that it "offers up two really good lead performances, an intriguing concept, and plenty of tension throughout."
