= Dan Børge Akerø =

Norwegian television personality (born 1951)

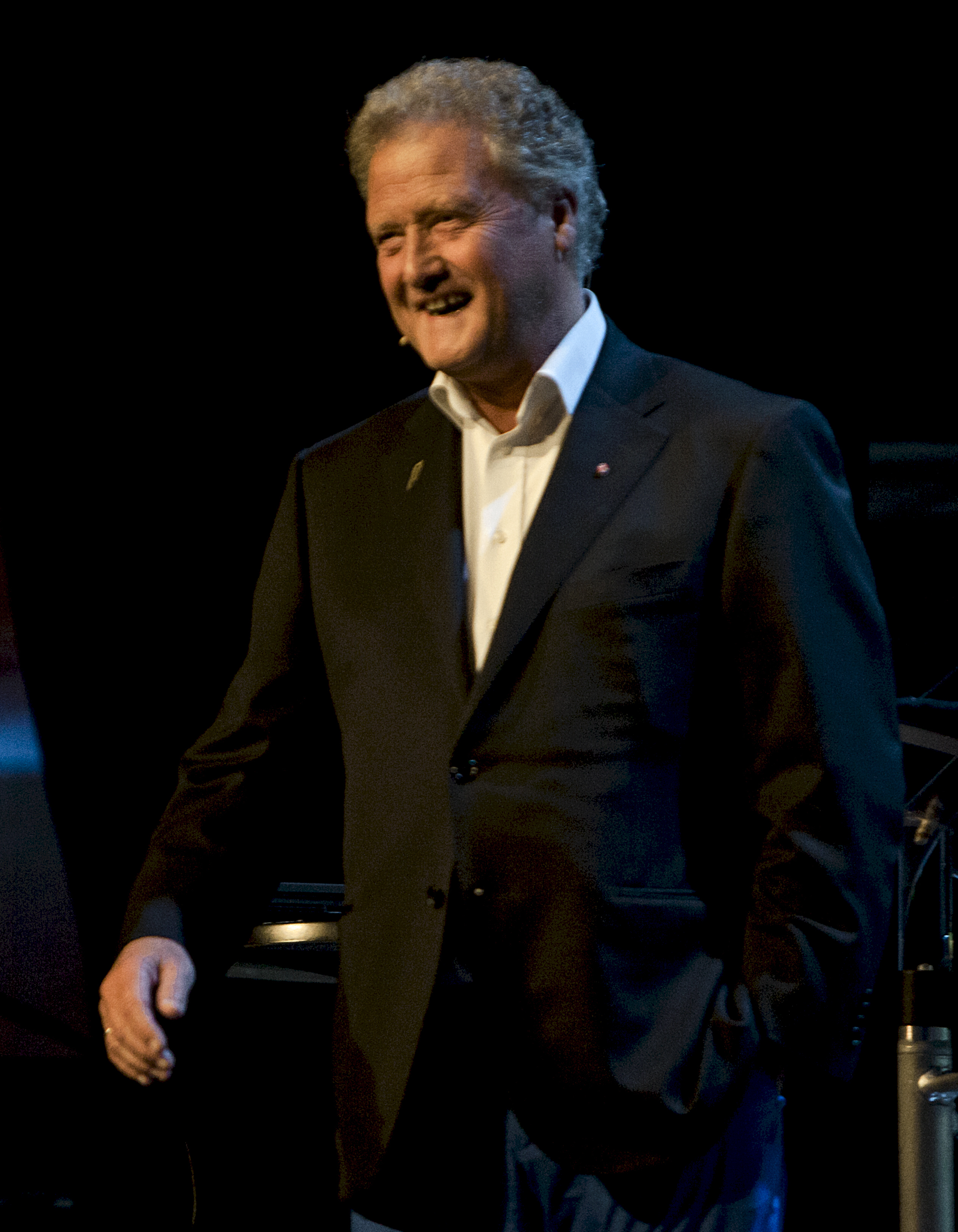
Dan Børge Akerø, 2012

Dan Børge Akerø (born 23 January 1951) is a Norwegian television personality.

He took his education at the University of Oslo, graduating with a cand.mag. degree. From 1975 to 1980 he worked as a research assistant and research fellow at the International Peace Research Institute, Oslo. He specialized in Latin American topics. In his younger days he also played association football for Skeid and Viking FK.

Before finishing his master's degree, he started his media career as a foreign affairs reporter in NRK Radio in 1979. He was then promoted to news anchor in the national news show Dagsrevyen. In 1986, he became a talk show host, for SenFredag, the first talk show on Norwegian television. He followed up with LørDan, which ran from 1987 to 1990. From 1990 to 1992 he was the sub-director of culture and entertainment in the Norwegian Broadcasting Corporation.

In 1992, when a rivalling channel TV 2 was opened, Akerø was headhunted there. He hosted its opening show as well as other entertainment programmes.

In the late nineties, he co-founded the online gambling company Global Money Games. The chairman of the board was former libertarian politician Pål Atle Skjervengen. The company later known as a stock market bubble, Akerø sold his shares some time before its demise in 1998. He has later established a lucrative investment company, Danpower International AS. However, on one occasion he personally lost NOK 1,500,000 through a failed investment in the hotel business.

Akerø returned to the Norwegian Broadcasting Corporation in 1999, and soon hosted the show Den store klassefesten. Between 2000 and 2005, the show had between 986,000 and 1,411,000 viewers; in comparison the whole country had about 4,500,000 inhabitants at the time. For this show, Akerø won two Gullruten awards, in 2001 and 2003. He is also known for hosting the musical competition show Kjempesjansen, as well as a new round of LørDan. He also hosted the annual show Idrettsgallaen and the 2007 and 2008 editions of the charitable fundraiser show TV-aksjonen.

Awards
Preceded by Jarl Goli and Gunvor Hals	Se og Hør's TV Personality of the Year; 1986	Succeeded by Eli Rygg
