= Per Jorsett =

Norwegian sports journalist (1920–2019)

- Jorsett, reporting from the 1979 European Speed Skating Championship in Deventer.
- Born: 11 May 1920; Kristiania, Norway
- Died: 30 January 2019 (aged 98); Oslo, Norway
- Occupations: Freelance sports reporter, sport historian and sports shooter
- Awards: King's Medal of Merit

Per Jorsett (11 May 1920 – 30 January 2019) was a Norwegian freelance sports reporter, sport historian and sports shooter. He reported for Sportsmanden from 1945 to 1961, and for the newspapers Dagbladet and Nationen. He had commissions for the Norwegian Broadcasting Corporation from 1947 to 1991, often along with fellow reporter Knut Bjørnsen. Among his books are Norges skytterkonger, Hvem er hvem i norsk idrett and books on the Olympic Games.

== Personal life ==
In 1943 Jorsett married Gerd Ingebjør Breen (1922–2009). He died in Oslo in 2019, aged 98.

== Selected works ==
- Oslo østre skytterlag gjennom 75 år. 1958.
- Skyttersaken i Norge. 1941–1965. 1966.
- Norges skytterkonger. 1970.
- Boken om de olympiske vinterlekene. 1991. (jointly with Aage Møst )
- Store norske sportsbragder i 1000 år. 1995. (jointly with Knut Bjørnsen)
- Hvem er hvem i norsk idrett. 1996.
- 100 år med olympiske leker. 1996.
- Landslaget. Det norske fotballandslagets historie. 1997. (jointly with Egil Olsen, Otto Ulseth and Arne Scheie)
- Cupen. NM i fotball. 1902–1999. 1999. (jointly with Arne Scheie)
