= Reciprocal switching =

Railroad shipping practice

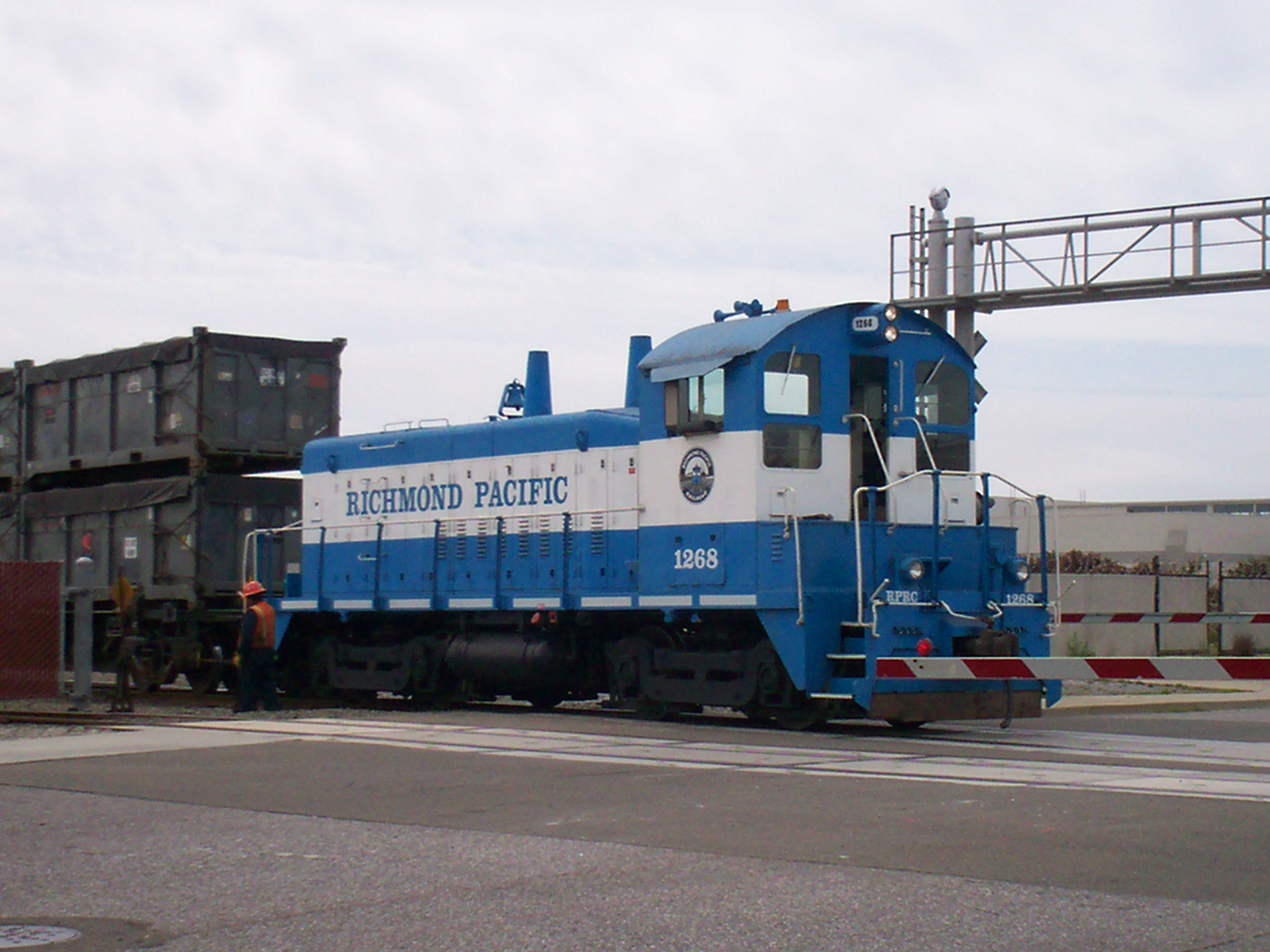
In reciprocal switching, the railroad company performing switching for a rail served shipper is different than the company which owns and operates the railroad tracks serving a shipper.

In railroad operations, reciprocal switching occurs when a customer served exclusively by one railroad company arranges for a different, nearby railroad company to handle their railroad service. Reciprocal switching is used to avoid the phenomenon of being a captive shipper; that is, a shipper which only has access to one railroad company, which therefore effectively has a local monopoly. While shippers and government regulators may promote reciprocal switching to increase competition, the practice may also increase the time it takes for railroad cars to travel to their destinations.
