= Viljar Bøe =

Norwegian film director (born 1997)

Viljar Bøe (born 22 August 22 1997) is a Norwegian director.

== Career ==
Bøe's 2022 film Good Boy was screened at Beyond Fest in Los Angeles on 27 September 2022. It was then screened at the Bergen International Film Festival on 25 October 2022. In June 2026, he made his Cannes Film Festival debut with his film You’ve Been Chosen.

== Filmography ==
- 2019: Bear Squad (short film)
- 2020: To Freddy
- 2022: Theodor
- 2022: Good Boy
- 2024: Above the Knee
- 2026: You’ve Been Chosen
