= Gunvor Hals =

Norwegian television personality (born 1953)

Gunvor Hals (born 16 April 1953) is a Norwegian television personality.

She hails from Tingvoll Municipality. She was known as a continuity announcer in Norwegian Broadcasting Corporation television before hosting her own show in the 1980s, Hæla i taket, a musical program with dansband and schlager-like songs. The long-running show which she hosted together with Vidar Lønn-Arnesen, Da Capo in the 1990s, was in the same vein. Other programs include Tango på Toten and Ti på ti, and she has also hosted "Kvelden før kvelden" shows (some in the Da Capo setting) in addition to announcing continuity. In 1985 she was awarded the Se og Hør readers' TV personality of the year award.

Since 1986 she is married to Hallvard Bakke.

Awards
Preceded by Kari Storækre and Simon Flem Devold	Se og Hør's TV Personality of the Year; 1985 (with Jarl Goli)	Succeeded by Dan Børge Akerø
