= Good Boy (2022 film) =

2022 Norwegian thriller film

- Directed by: Viljar Bøe
- Screenplay by: Viljar Bøe
- Produced by: Karl Oskar Åsli; Mikkel Dueholm Danekilde
- Starring: Gard Løkke; Katrine Lovise Øpstad Fredrikse; Nicolai Narvesen Lied; Amalie Willoch Njaastad
- Production company: Fredagsfilm
- Release date: 27 September 2022
- Running time: 76 minutes
- Country: Norway
- Languages: Norwegian; English

Good Boy (Norwegian:Meg, deg & Peg) is a 2022 Norwegian thriller film, written and directed by Viljar Bøe.

== Plot ==
Christian, a wealthy heir to his late parents' fortune, meets a woman named Sigrid on a dating app. Their first date goes well and culminates in him taking her to his house, where he mentions that he has a dog. The two spend the night together, but the following morning, Sigrid learns that Christian's "dog" is actually his human roommate, Frank, who wears a realistic dog costume and behaves like an actual dog. She leaves, disturbed.

At home, Sigrid learns from her roommate Aurora that Christian is a multi-millionaire. Assuming that Frank behaves like a dog as a sexual fetish, Sigrid reestablishes contact with Christian and agrees to meet him again. At Christian's house, he offers little to no explanation as to why Frank behaves like a dog, but insists he complies with it under Frank's wishes. Sigrid asks to meet Frank, and Christian agrees under the condition that she treat Frank like a dog rather than a human. Christian later confides in Sigrid that he and Frank met as children, and that Frank didn't have many friends growing up; though Christian was popular, he feels that Frank was his only true friend as their other peers only coveted his friendship for his wealth.

Sigrid accepts Christian's invitation to a weekend cabin trip, with Frank in attendance. Upon arriving, Christian convinces Sigrid to relinquish her phone so they can enjoy each other's company without distractions, and locks both her and his own phone away in an undisclosed location. While Christian leaves the room, Frank speaks to Sigrid for the first time, insisting that Christian is insane and imploring Sigrid to escape with him. Frank assumes his dog persona once again when Christian returns, but Sigrid is visibly troubled for the remainder of the night.

Sigrid tries to leave the following morning, only to find the door locked. Christian catches her searching for a key and takes her outside, declining her request for her own key as he claims to only have one. Sigrid later asks Christian to return her phone, claiming to want to check in on her ostensibly ill mother. Christian agrees, but has Sigrid call her mother in front of him, exposing her ruse when Sigrid's mother does not indicate that she is unwell during the call. Christian confiscates Sigrid's phone again, but agrees when she asks to take Frank for a walk alone.

During the walk, Frank warns that Christian is prepared for the possibility of them escaping and that to ensure their survival, Sigrid should kill Frank while he is asleep. She hides a knife under her pillow, but collapses during dinner and is brought upstairs by Christian, later awakening in the middle of the night to find the knife gone. Christian awakens simultaneously and brings her downstairs, then plays a recording of Sigrid and Frank's conversation and procures the knife Sigrid hid. Holding her at knifepoint, Christian leads Sigrid to the basement, where an unmasked, ball-gagged Frank is locked in a cage. Christian removes Frank's gag before caressing and speaking to him affectionately, whereupon Frank bites him; the ensuing struggle between the men buys Sigrid time to take the key and escape. Asserting that Frank must be "punished," Christian drags him into his barn and subjects him to various torture.

Sigrid returns to rescue Frank, sneaking up behind the two while Christian is spanking Frank and knocking Christian out with a wooden club. Since Frank is too exhausted from the extensive torture to walk, Sigrid tries to carry him, but struggles as he is too heavy; Christian awakens and knocks them both out before collapsing to the floor and sobbing.

Some time later, Christian prepares himself breakfast before pouring dog food into a bowl and delivering it to Frank, who is still in the basement. He then does the same to Sigrid, now chained up in Christian's barn and wearing a dog suit of her own.

== Cast ==
- Gard Løkke as Christian
- Katrine Lovise Øpstad Fredriksen as Sigrid
- Nicolai Narvesen Song as Frank
- Amalie Willoch Njaastad as Aurora

== Release ==
Good Boy was screened at Beyond Fest in Los Angeles on 27 September 2022. It was then screened at the Bergen International Film Festival on 25 October 2022. In 2023 Saban Films purchased the distribution rights for North America.

== Reception ==
=== Critical response ===
Good Boy received positive reviews from critics on its release. Review aggregation website Rotten Tomatoes, which has compiled old and contemporary reviews, reports that 94% of 15 critics provided positive reviews for the film.
