= Geir Børresen =

Norwegian actor and entertainer (1942–2022)

- Born: 16 November 1942; Oslo, Norway
- Died: 25 July 2022 (aged 79); Bærum, Norway
- Occupations: Actor, entertainer

Geir Børresen (16 November 1942 – 25 July 2022) was a Norwegian actor and entertainer.

== Biography ==
Børresen was born in Oslo on 16 November 1942. He made his film debut in Liv in 1967, and made his stage debut at Nationaltheatret in 1968. He was a presenter on Lekestue, based on BBC's Play School, for NRK from 1975–1981.

He played the characters "Labbetuss" and "Max Mekker" in the television series Sesam Stasjon (a Norwegian spin-off of Sesame Street) in the 1990s. He provided the voice of Trigger in the Norwegian dub of Robin Hood (1973 film).

He is known for songs based on the comics series The Smurfs, and his albums I Smurfeland (1978), Sommer i Smurfeland (1979) and Alle gode ting er Smurf (1979) sold a total of nearly 400,000 copies.

Børresen died in Bærum on 25 July 2022.
