= Simon Flem Devold =

Norwegian author and musician (1929–2015)

- Born: Helge Flem Devold; 17 March 1929; Namsos
- Origin: Norway
- Died: 20 May 2015 (aged 86) Oslo
- Genres: Jazz
- Occupations: Musician, writer
- Instrument: Clarinet
- Formerly of: Tord Gustavsen; S.F.D. Quartet

Simon Flem Devold birthname Helge Flem Devold (17 March 1929 – 20 May 2015) born in Namsos, Norway, was a Norwegian author, journalist and jazz clarinetist.

When he was three years of age he and his family moved to Ålesund, where he was raised. His change of name from Helge to Simon occurred in connection with his affiliation with Subud, a worldwide association with Indonesian Indonesian roots where «the desire for the individual is to find the person you want to be here on earth».

In 2012, Devold received the Fritt Ord Honorary Award for his «groundbreaking commitment as a facilitator of children's voices, life experiences and rights» through the column «På skråss» in Aftenposten, often based on taboo themes.

== Author and writer ==
Devold is perhaps best known as a representative and defender for the children, including through his regular column in Aftenposten, «På skråss».

Devold's debuted as author with the book Gutta og jeg in 1973, a collection of portraits of city originals. He has written 17 books, equally distributed between books on children's understanding of life and rights, and books on urban originals. His perhaps most famous book, Morten, 11 år, has been translated into Swedish, German, Dutch and Japanese.

He also worked as a journalist at Sunnmørsposten, where he was particularly noted with his sharp pen – and the figure Maskemakk, which featured in Sunnmørsposten in the 1970s and was known for its quaint English: «The fast-window went on reason» (Hurtigruta ran aground).

== The musician ==
Devold led the S.F.D. Quartet, and in recent years he played a lot with Tord Gustavsen. Devold's quartet played swing jazz à la Benny Goodman, and from the mid-1950s he was one of the most famous jazz groups in Norway, especially in his genre. The quartet originally consisted of Devold (Clarinet and Saxophone), Ivar Skuseth (Vibraphone), Kåre Halvorsen (Piano) and Leif Hessen (Drums). The quartet was periodically expanded to quintet with additional guitar accompaniment.

Devold contributed to Turid Lisbeth Nygård's children's jazz record Trollhalen (Musico, 2001). Together with Marit Carlsen he released the album Swingende Barnetro (KKV, 1989), and with Jon Kirkebø Rosslund and Pål Are Bakksjø he provided jazz kindergarten at Hemnesjazz (1999).

== Children of the Earth ==
In 1987, Devold got the idea that Nordkapp could be used for something of positive importance far beyond Norway's borders. In collaboration with, among others, Nordkapps Vel, seven children from different parts of the earth gathered at Nordkapp. Hence the name of the Barn av Jorden (Children of the Eart). The project has been transformed into an award given to a person or project that has shown care and ability to help distressed children. Barn av Jorden's Prize are worth NOK 100,000 and are awarded each year in June at Nordkapp.

== Honors ==
- Hirschfeldtprisen 1965
- Name of the Year at Dagbladet 1984
- TV profile of the year at Se og Hør 1985
- Paul Robesonprisen 1988
- Brobyggerprisen 1996
- Brummprisen 1996
- Wandaprisen 1998
- Tulipanprisen 2000
- King's Medal of Merit in gold 2002
- Åpenhetsprisen 2006
- Barnehelseprisen 2011
- Fritt Ord Honorary Award 2012

Awards
| Preceded by Knut Bjørnsen | Se og Hør's TV Personality of the Year; 1984 (with Kari Storækre) | Succeeded by Jarl Goli and Gunvor Hals |
