= Våg og vinn =

- Genre: Reality TV
- Presented by: Jarl Goli; Lise Nilsen
- Country of origin: Norway
- Original language: Norwegian

Production
- Running time: 60 minutes (including commercials)

Original release
- Network: TV3
- Release: 1997

Våg og vinn was a Norwegian television program that aired on TV3 and was hosted by Jarl Goli and Lise Nilsen.

== About the show ==
Våg og vinn was a program where regular people would get challenged to take risks. The host would offer money for the person to take the risk.

== Challenges ==
Among the challenges in the program you would see Camilla get attacked by 50 000 bees, Norwegian News Agency journalist Bjørn Hassel would balance an iron steel pipe across Lysefjorden. Mia Gundersen was one of the celebrities who would get challenged.
