= Eyvind Skeie =

Norwegian priest and author (born 1947)

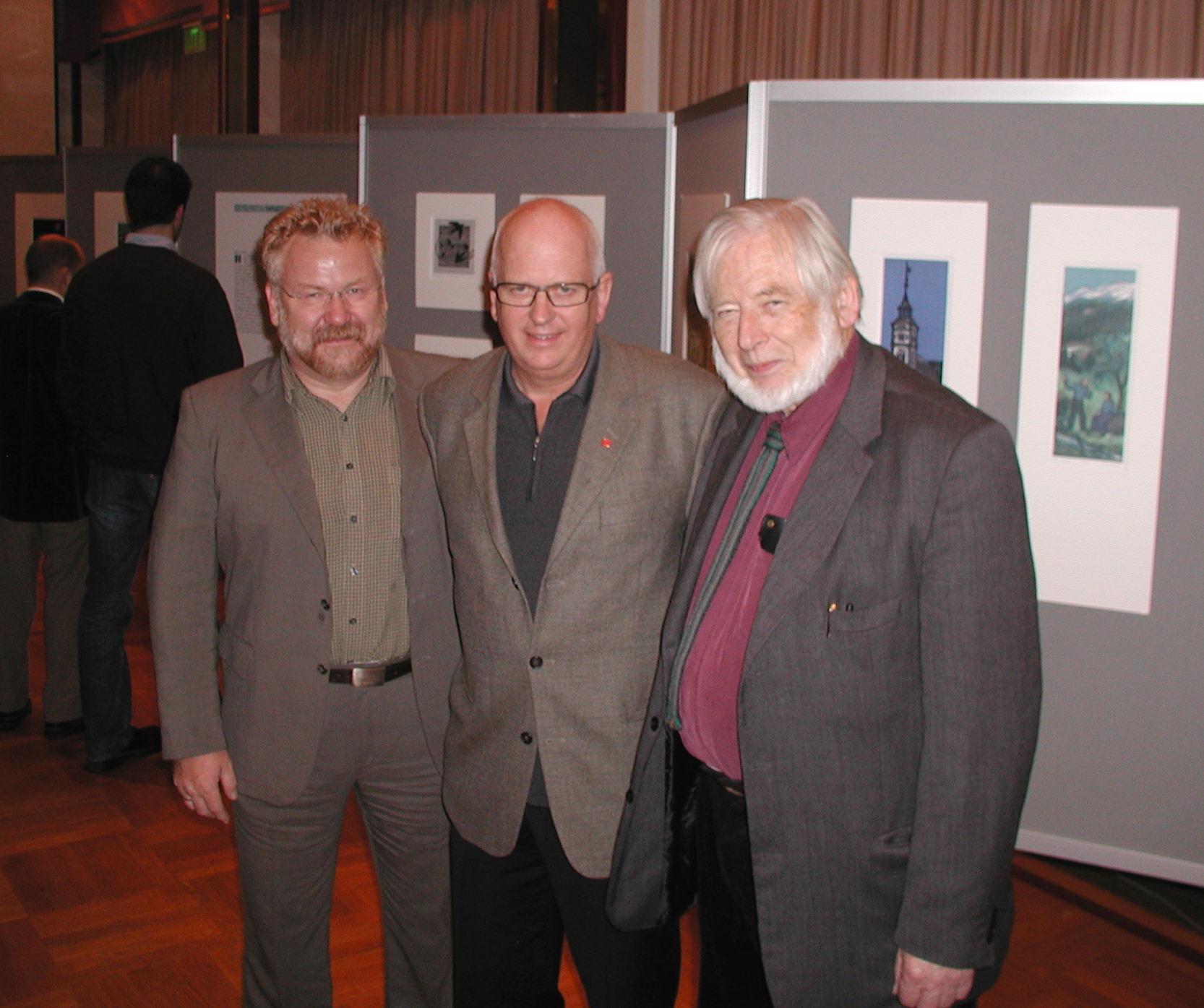
Eyvind Skeie (middle) together with graphic designer Klaus Erik Krogh and graphic artist Terje Grøstad in 2005.

Eyvind Skeie (born 5 November 1947) is a Norwegian priest and author.

Skeie is a trained theologian from the MF Norwegian School of Theology and was ordained in 1974. He was chaplain in Tromsø from 1975 to 1980, then worked for Oslo City Mission from 1980 to 1985, and was chaplain in Oslo Cathedral from 1984 to 1985. He has since worked as a writer, hymn writer and lecturer.

Eyvind Skeie has written several children programs for TV, among others Portveien 2, Sesam Stasjon, textbooks, poetry books and stories for children and adults. He has registered about 1,500 songs and hymns in TONO, the Norwegian copyright organization, and has also been in the board of different the copyright organizations. In 2007 Skeie published 316 salmer og sanger, a book with his own hymns. His most famous song is En stjerne skinner i natt, ('A Star is Shining Tonight'), co-written with Tore W. Aas. The song has been recorded by, among others, Oslo Gospel Choir and Swedish singer Carola Häggkvist. Together with Sigvald Tveit, Skeie wrote Visst skal våren komme ('Surely Spring Will Come'). The song Tenn lys ('Ignite', music by Sigvald Tveit) have found its way from the TV series Portveien 2 and into the Norwegian hymn book. In 2007 Eyvind Skeie, together with graphic artist and painter Terje Grøstad and graphic designer Klaus Erik Krogh, published Vann av klippen ('Water From the Rock'), an illustrated text collection of some 400 prayers and meditations by Skeie.

Eyvind Skeie has also had international engagements, particularly related to religion. In a period he had close contact with communities in Azerbaijan and participated in an archaeological excavation. He also traveled with researcher Thor Heyerdahl on his travel from Baku to Tbilisi in the hunt for Odin. Through his wife's sister, Skeie is a brother-in-law of former Prime Minister Kjell Magne Bondevik. The King of Norway honored Eyvind Skeie as Commander of the Order of St. Olav in 2007.
