= Harald Mæle =

Harald Mæle (born 14 april 1944) is a Norwegian television presenter and voice actor. He made a name in the Norwegian Broadcasting Corporation, where he gave the Norwegian voice to the US sitcom Soap (TV series), and presented the popular science show Magnus. He has later worked as a voice actor on numerous animated films, such as The Jungle Book (as Bagheera), Pocahontas (as Chief Powhatan) and Mulan (as Yao). and provided the Norwegian voices for the Sesame Street characters, Bert, Grover, and Cookie Monster.
