= Eli Rygg =

Norwegian television personality and children's writer (1955–2026)

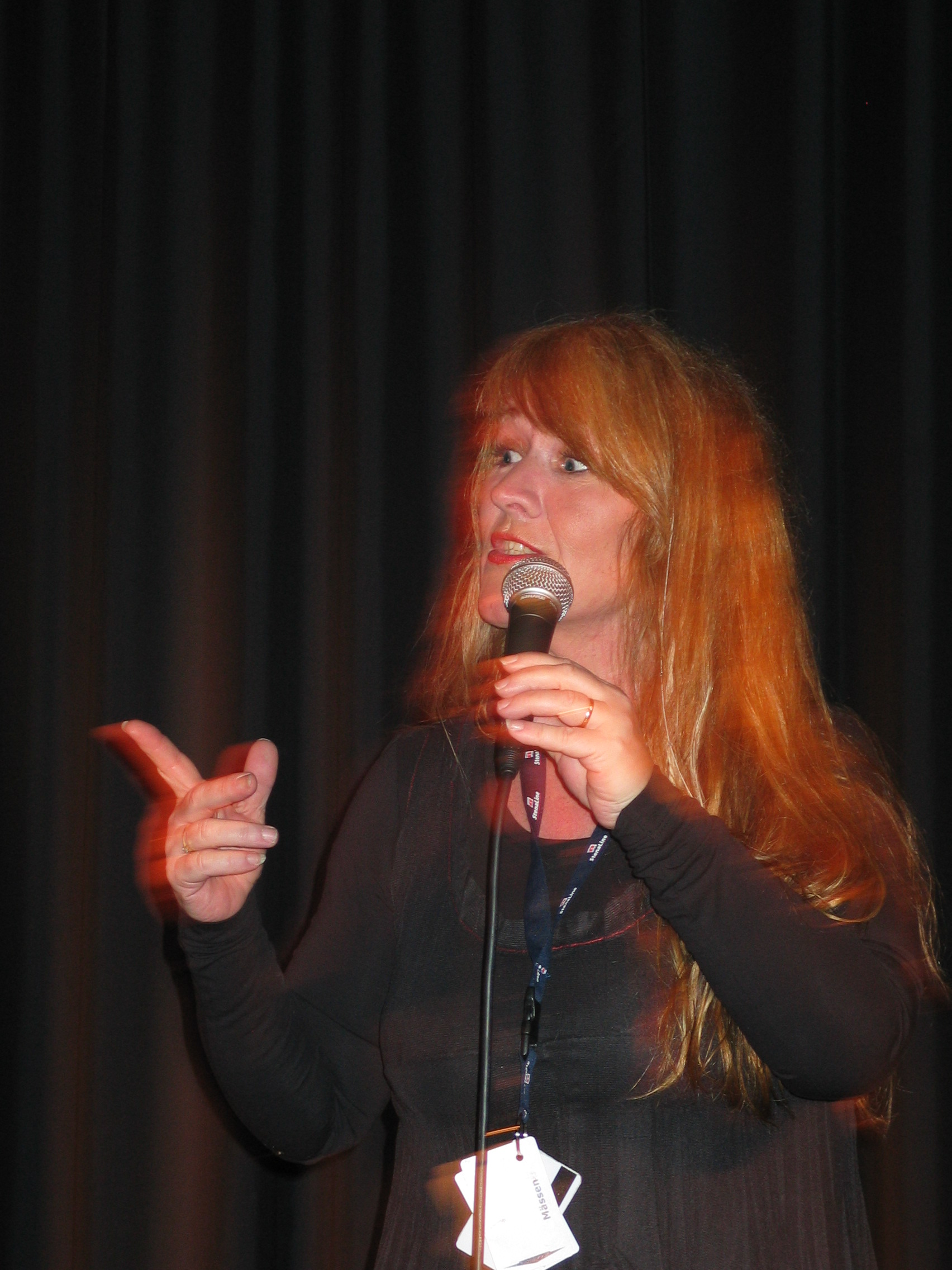
- Rygg in 2009
- Born: 22 September 1955; Veblungsnes, Norway
- Died: 15 October 2026 (aged 71)
- Occupations: Television personality; children's writer
- Years active: 1985–2026

Eli Rygg (22 September 1955 – 15 October 2026) was a Norwegian television personality and children's writer.

== Life and career ==
Rygg grew up in Veblungsnes and moved to Levanger at the age of 12. She attended folk high school in Skogn Municipality and Inderøy Municipality. She had a daughter as a teenager (in 1973), and studied domestic science and childcare in Skatval, and thereafter found work in Stjørdal Municipality. In 1985 she moved to Oslo as she was drafted by the Norwegian Broadcasting Corporation to star in the children's television show Portveien 2. In 1987 she was awarded the Se og Hør readers' TV personality of the year award.

She later hosted Teodors julekalender and Frokost-TV on NRK1, Barn ingen hindring on NRK2 and the radio show Revehiet on P4 Radio Hele Norge. She also wrote several children's books, and has read fairytales for a live audience, among others with backing by Concerts Norway.

Rygg resided in Son until her death on 15 October 2026, at the age of 71.

Awards
Preceded by Dan Børge Akerø	Se og Hør's TV Personality of the Year; 1987	Succeeded by Erik Diesen
