= Portveien 2 =

Norwegian children's television show

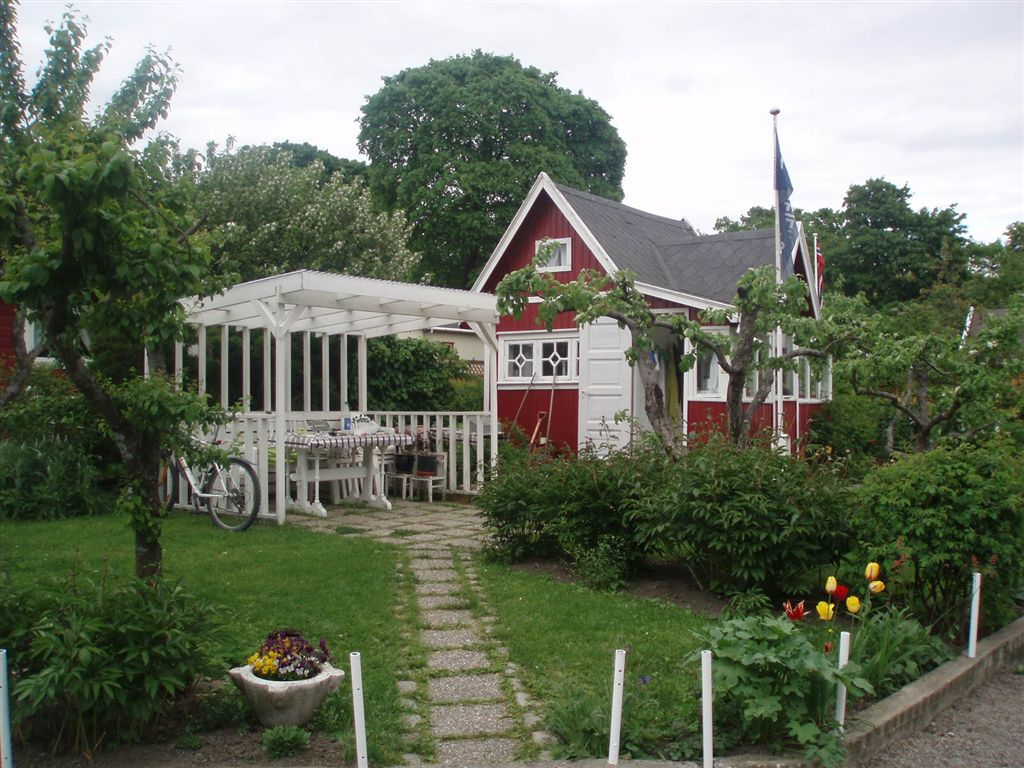
The house used for Portveien 2

Portveien 2 was a children's TV-show produced by NRK, which premiered on 19 March 1985. It has had many reruns, and has become a part of Norwegian TV history. The show produced 140 episodes. The outdoor footage for the series was filmed in a little house in the allotment gardens at Sagene in Oslo, Norway. Portveien 2 is not a real address, the closest street is Kongsvingergata.

The series was NRK's first production where the shootings were rationalised, so one could make a large volume of episodes. Portveien 2 was an attempt to make a children's show for the youngest children and at the same time engage the whole family. The themes in the shows were generally attached to nature, but also to fairytales, traditions, feelings and other social relationships.

== Contributors ==
The scriptwriters were Eyvind Skeie and Gudny Hagen, both of whom have contributed to many children shows. The producers were Herman Gran, Grete Høien, Inger Bjørnstad and Dieter Kriznat. The hosts were Eli Rygg and Jarl Goli together with Terje Strømdahl who shared the role as the male host. The hand puppet giraffe Raffen was played by Åsmund Huser, who also played the role as the secret occupant of the house who was never revealed.
