= Shunting (rail) =

Process of sorting rolling stock into complete trains

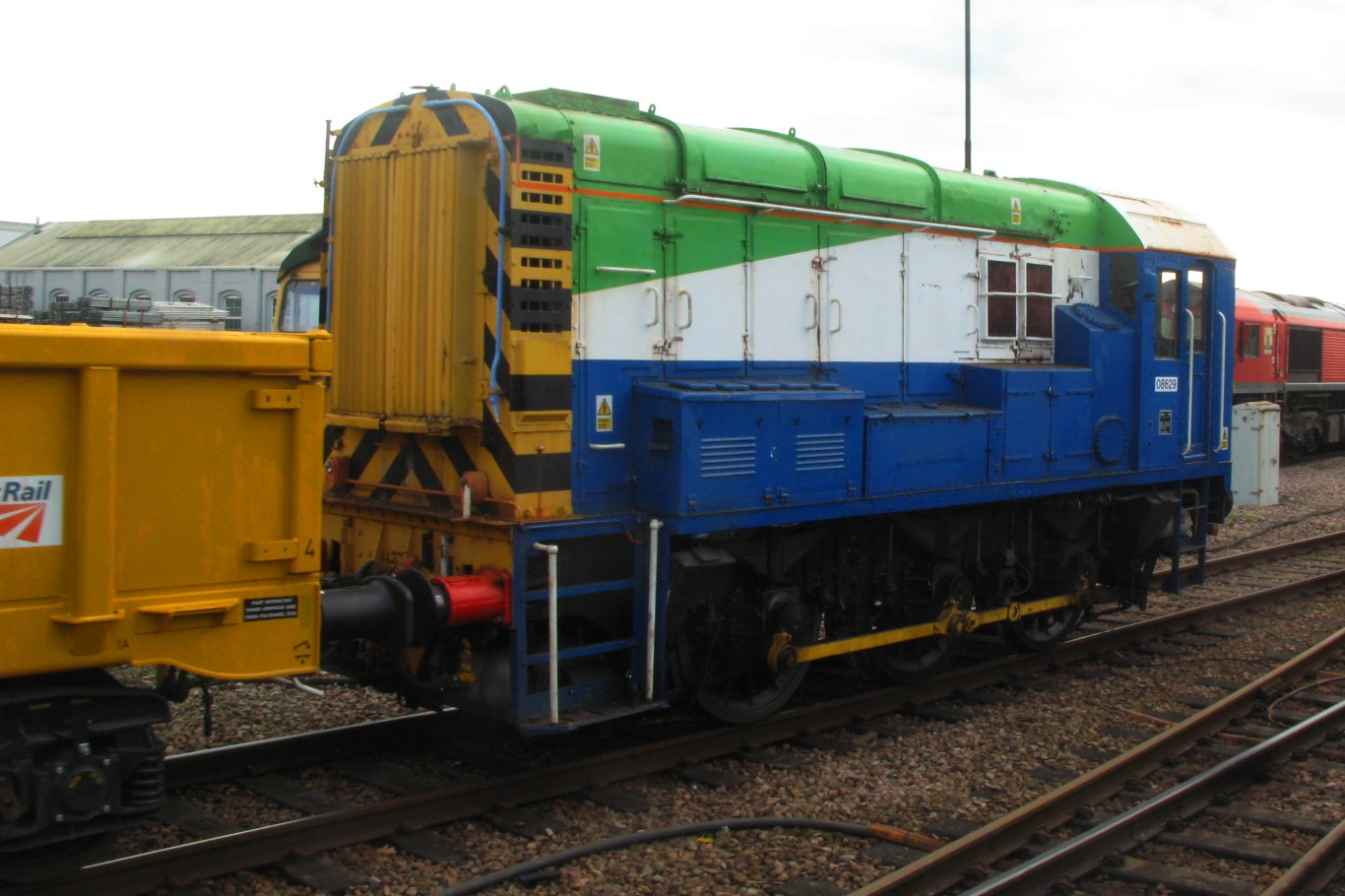
A British Rail Class 08 shunting ballast wagons at Eastleigh Depot.

Shunting, in railway operations, is the process of sorting items of rolling stock into complete trains, or the reverse. In the United States this activity is known as switching.

== Motive power ==
Motive power is normally provided by a locomotive known as a shunter locomotive (in the UK) or switcher locomotive (in the US). Most shunter and switchers are now diesel-powered but steam or even electric locomotives have been used. Where locomotives could not be used (e.g. because of weight restrictions) shunting operations have in the past been effected by horses or capstans.

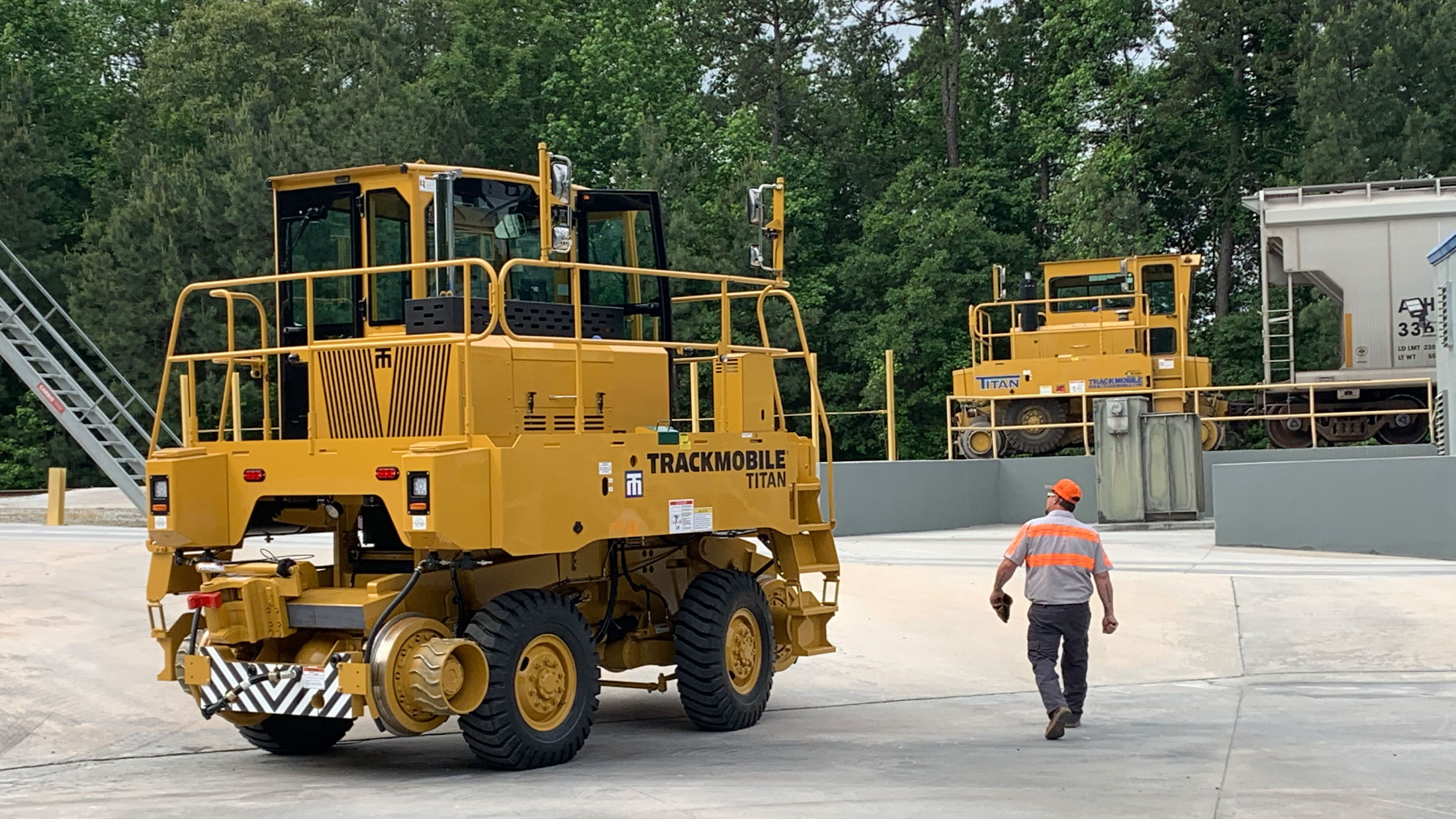
Trackmobile Titan

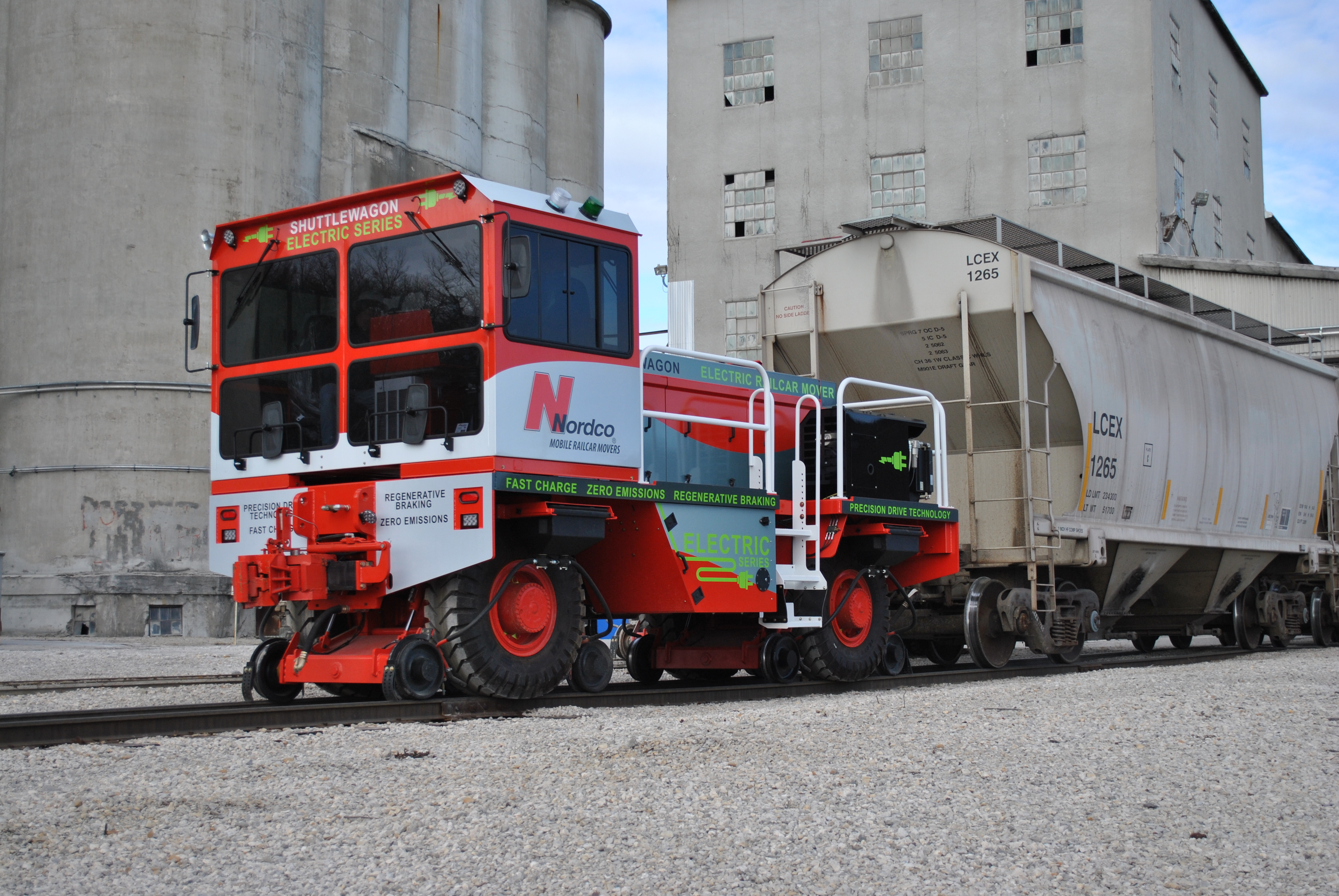
Shuttlewagon NVX-E

A railcar mover (also called a shunt vehicle in Australia, the UK, and in Canada, or the trademarks Trackmobile or ShuttleWagon) is a road–rail vehicle (capable of travelling on both roads and rail tracks) fitted with couplers for moving small numbers of railroad cars around in a rail siding or small yard.

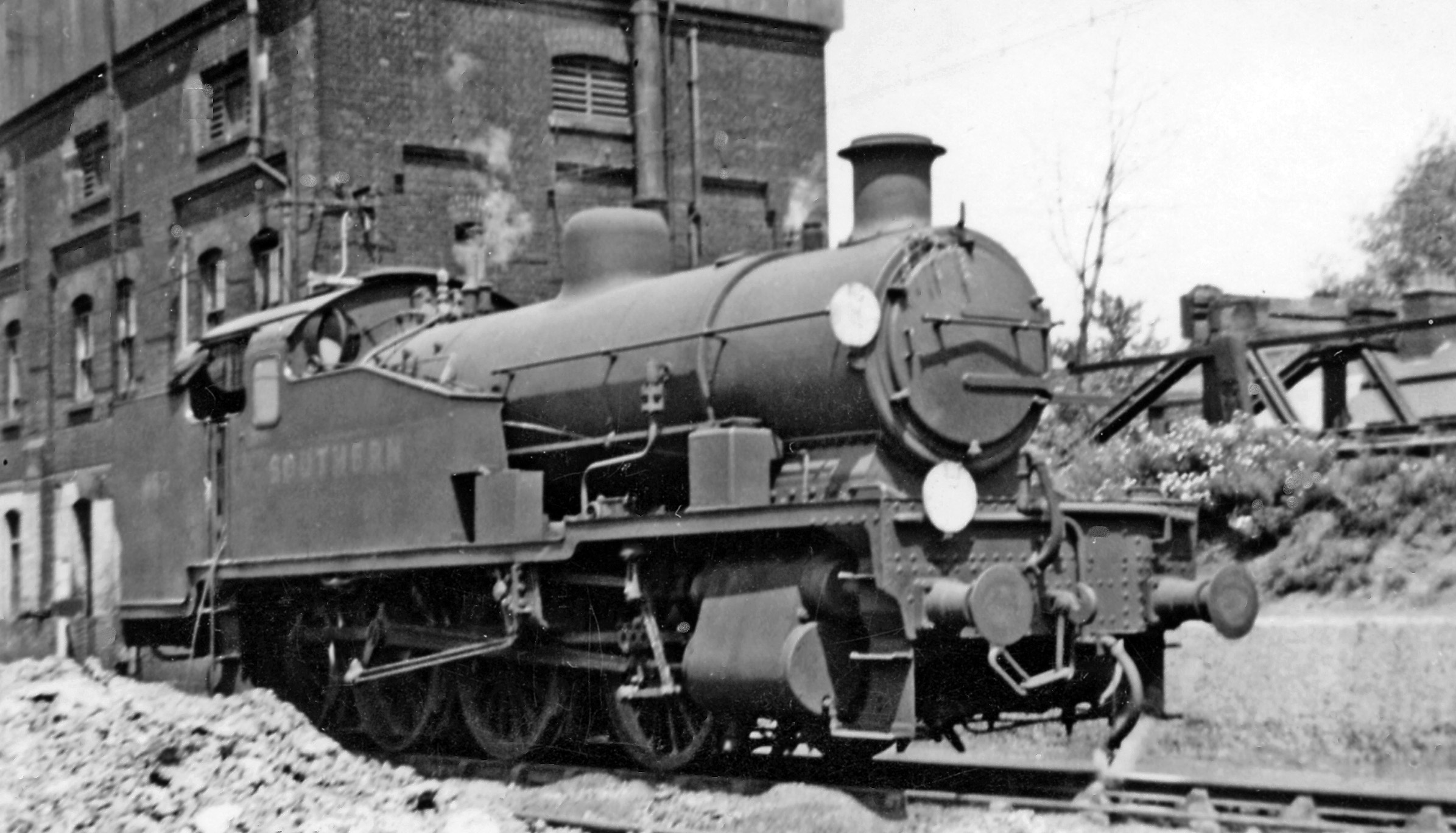
A heavy steam shunting locomotive, SR Z class, Great Britain

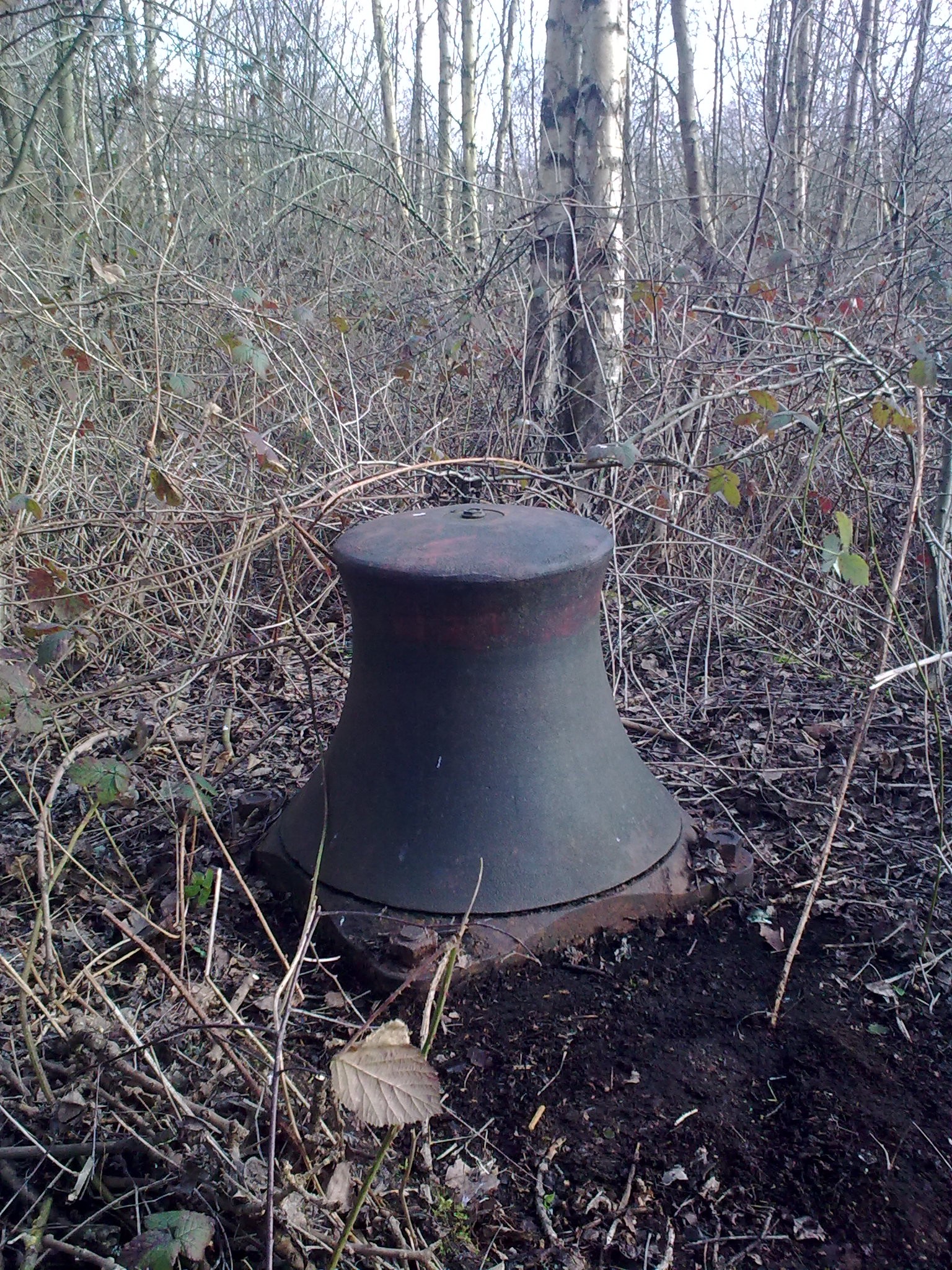
Railway shunting capstan found at site of former Hull and Barnsley Railway sidings south of Springhead works

== Hazards ==
=== Coupling ===
The terms "shunter" and "switcher" are not only applied to locomotives but also to employees engaged on the ground with shunting/switching operations. The task of such personnel is particularly dangerous because not only is there the risk of being run over, but on some railway systems—particularly ones that use buffer-and-chain/screw coupling systems—the shunters have to get between the wagons/carriages in order to complete coupling and uncoupling. This was particularly so in the past. The Midland Railway company, for example, kept an ambulance wagon permanently stationed at Toton Yard to give treatment to injured shunters.

Of the 20,964 staff accidents in the UK that were investigated by the Railway Inspectorate between 1900 and 1939 (around 3% of all staff accidents), 6701, including 1033 fatal accidents, were classified as involving shunting.

The main tool of shunters working with hook-and-chain couplings was a shunting pole, which allowed the shunter to reach between wagons to fasten and unfasten couplings without having physically to go between the vehicles. This type of shunting pole was of an entirely different design than objects of the same name in North American practice (see below).

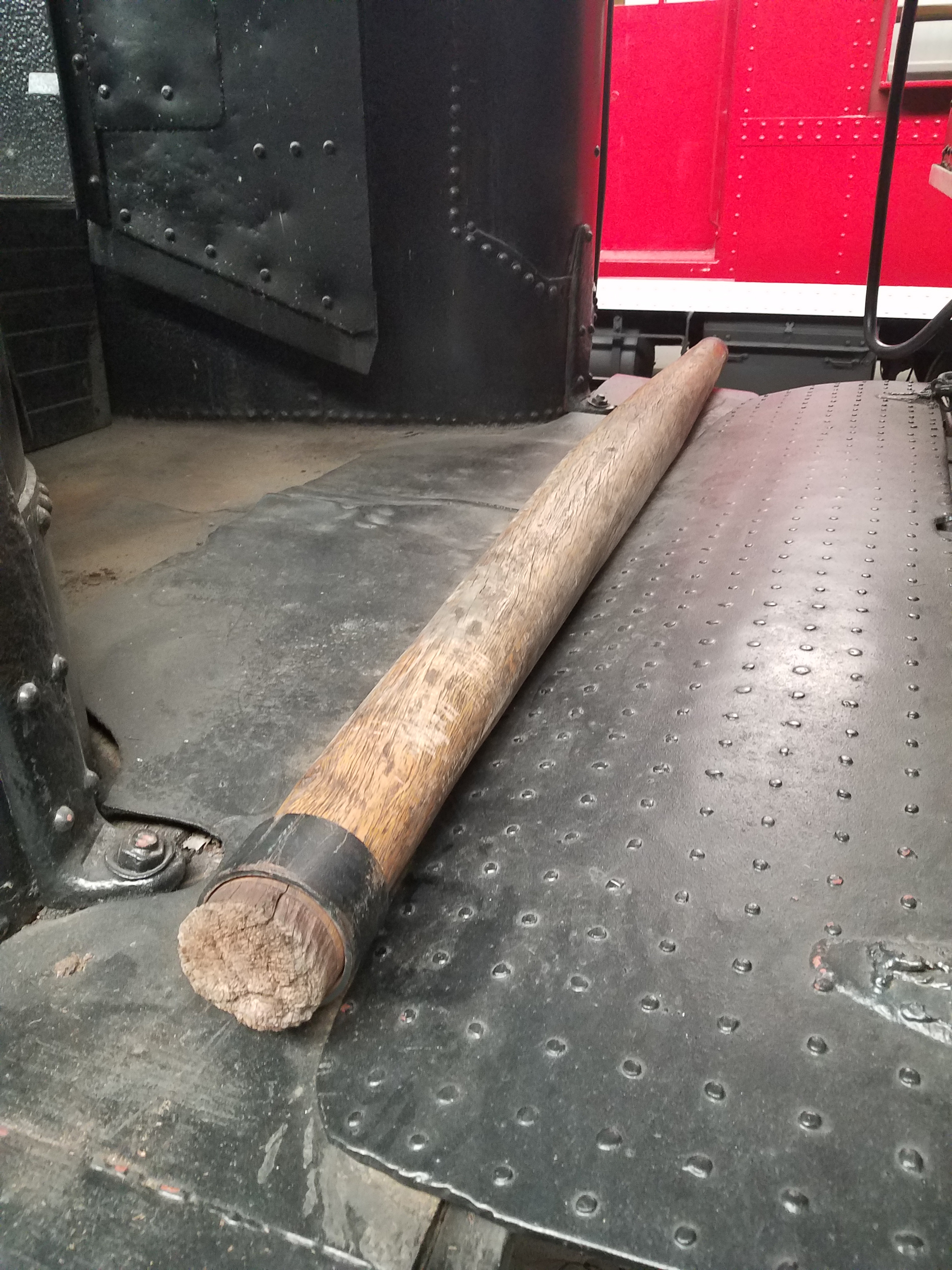
A shunting pole preserved at the National Railroad Museum in Green Bay, Wisconsin, US

=== Poling ===
In some countries, a pole was sometimes used to move cars on adjacent tracks. In the United States this procedure was known as "pole switching" or "poling" for short. In the UK it was known as "propping." In these instances, the locomotive or another car was moved to be near the car that needed to be moved. The on-ground railwayman would then position a wooden pole, which was sometimes permanently attached to the locomotive, and engage it in the poling pocket of the car that needed to be moved. The engineer would then use the pole to push the car on the adjacent track. Before poling pockets or poles were common on switching locomotives, some US railroads built specialized poling cars which could be coupled to locomotives that lacked poling pockets. The practice was most prevalent in rail yard operations prior to 1900. Poling was the cause of some accidents and in later years was discouraged before the practice was abandoned.

== See also ==
- Marshalling (UK) or classification (US) yard
- Switcher locomotive
- Switching and terminal railroad
- Reciprocal switching
