= List of Norwegian magazines =

In Norway, the number of women's magazines in 2013 were 17, whereas there were only three men's magazines. The circulation of Norwegian magazines declined 32% from 2004 to 2012.

The following is a list of Norwegian magazines, listed by circulation in 2007, according to the Norwegian Media Businesses' Association. The list contains only weekly magazines, and is limited to the top twenty.

Rank	Title	Circulation	Genre
1	Se og Hør (Tuesday edition)	235,695	TV listings and celebrity journalism
2	Hjemmet	206,543	Women's lifestyle magazine
3	Her og Nå	179,422	TV listings and celebrity journalism
4	Se og Hør (weekend edition)	175,517	TV listings and celebrity journalism
5	Familien	129,367	Women's lifestyle magazine
6	Norsk Ukeblad	126,591	Women's lifestyle magazine
7	Donald Duck & Co	111,367	Comic book
8	Vi Menn	96,827	Men's lifestyle magazine
9	Allers	81,549	Women's lifestyle magazine
10	Illustrert vitenskap	76,113	Popular science
11	Norsk Golf	75,626	Golf
12	Hytteliv	61,043	Cabin living
13	Bonytt	59,829	Interior design
14	Kvinner og Klær	54,809	Women's lifestyle magazine
15	FHM	54,146	Lad's mag
16	Det Nye	52,798	Women's lifestyle magazine
17	Foreldre & Barn	52,506	Parenting of infants
18	Bil	52,368	Motoring
19	Kamille (magazine)	46,213	Women's lifestyle magazine
20	Topp	43,941	Teen magazine

== Other magazines ==
=== Defunct magazines ===
- Byggekunst
- Eva
- Farmand
- Fritt Ord
- Hvepsen
- Kingsize Magazine
- Kontakt
- Kringsjaa
- Krydder
- Impressionisten
- Mann
- Mot Dag
- Nationalt Tidsskrift
- Nordisk musik-tidende
- Norsk idrætsblad
- Økonomisk Rapport
- Pop Revyen
- Profil
- Ragnarok
- Ringeren
- Statsborgeren
- Urda
- Ute og hjemme
- Vinduet

=== Others ===
- Aktuell Rapport
- Apollon
- Dine Penger
- Fett
- Henne
- HjemmePC
- Kirke og Kultur
- Lev Landlig
- Naturen
- Ordet
- Perspective
- Pleasure
- Putsj
- Rotary Norden
- Scream Magazine
- Sirene
- Syn og Segn
- Teknisk Ukeblad
- Tara
- Toons Mag
- VG Godt
- Vi over 60
- Voksen
- Z Filmtidsskrift
- Visit (magazine)

== See also ==
- Media of Norway
