= Helene Rask =

Norwegian model (born 1980)

- Born: Anne-Helene Rask Arnesen; 11 November 1980 (age 45)
- Other name: Helene Rask
- Website: www.helenerask.com

Anne-Helene Rask Arnesen (born 11 November 1980), better known as Helene Rask, is a Norwegian model from Nesodden.

She began modelling when she was 17, she is known for appearing in magazines such as FHM, Vi Menn, Henne, Se og Hør and Her og Nå; as well as for participating in the Norwegian version of Fear Factor, during which she almost drowned, on TV3. She is also working for Gatebil magazine, modelling and answering readers' questions.

Rask has also released four singles ("No Love" in 2005, "Magic Summer" and "Get On" in 2006, and "Venus" in 2009), an album (2006's Colours) and a DVD as a singer, distributed by the Norwegian record company Best Of Music. She is also the owner of Rask Models, a Norwegian model agency.
