= Ernst Gervin =

Norwegian magazine editor (1908–1978)

Ernst Ancher Gervin (6 December 1908 – 27 January 1978) was a Norwegian magazine editor.

He was born as Ernst Ancher Hanssen, but changed his name to Gervin in 1948. He was the editor-in-chief of Norsk Ukeblad from 1934 until 1952 and Hjemmet from 1952 to 1964. From 1965 to 1976 he worked for the publishing house Gutenbergshus, where he was responsible for the comic Donald Duck & Co.

During the occupation of Norway by Nazi Germany he was a controversial figure among the occupying Germans. His magazine was responsible for the comic 91 Stomperud, which had run since 1937 with Gervin as the textwriter. In 1942 it was found that 91 Stomperud mocked the occupying forces, and Norsk Ukeblad was stopped for four weeks. He was later imprisoned with caricaturer Gunnar Bratlie for a caricature of Vidkun Quisling in Norsk Ukeblad in February 1943 (#8). The caricature portrayed Quisling as an unsteady ice skating boy, who was being helped to stand up by a man with a Hitler moustache. He was imprisoned in Grini concentration camp from 23 February to 24 May 1943.

In 1963 there was a mild controversy when the Donald Duck comic story Lost in the Andes! was translated and printed in Norway as Eggemysteriet ("the Egg Mystery"). The translator Vivi Aagaard chose an archaic and slightly garbled version of the Norwegian language form Nynorsk for the mountain-dwellers, and this was widely seen as an insult. Thus, through the Norwegian language struggle, the story got quite a lot of attention in Norwegian media.

Gervin died in January 1978 and was buried in Ullern.
