= Finn Bjelke =

Norwegian journalist

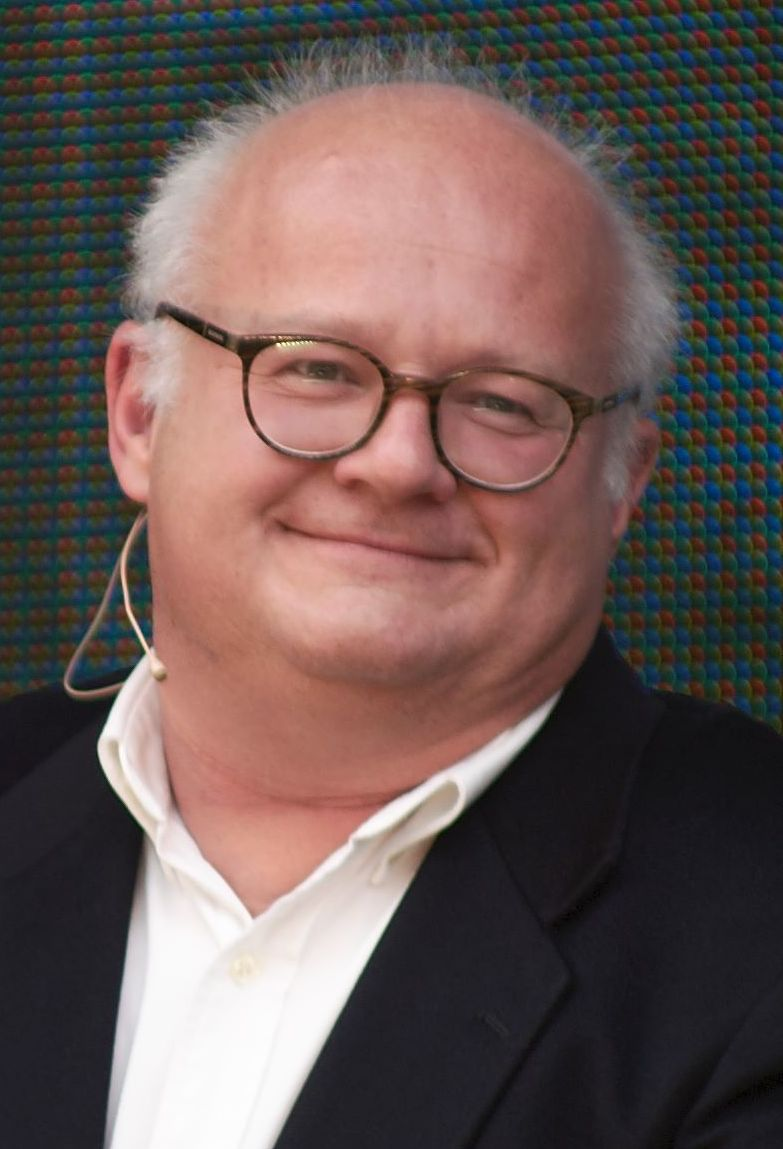
Finn Bjelke

Finn Bjelke (born 10 April 1959) is a popular Norwegian humourist, writer, music journalist and radio host.

Finn Bjelke is known as program host at the Norwegian Broadcasting Corporation for their radio shows Reiseradioen, Popquiz, and Herreavdelingen. At Herreavdelingen he works equally together with Yan Friis.

From 1985 to 1990, Bjelke was a writer in the Norwegian youth magazine Det Nye. Bjelke has also written for the Norwegian music magazines Puls and Beat. From 1993 to 1995 Bjelke was producer for radio shows like IRMA 1000 at NRK P3. Finn Bjelke has also written several books, among them the bestseller "Pappa For Første Gang" (a guide to first time fathers) and "Gutta På Kur" with Kim Bjørnqvist (a guide to lose weight for couch potatoes). Finn Bjelke also co-wrote the script for the feature film "Showbiz" (1988) and was a regular panelist on the popular radio- and TV-show "20 Spørsmål" ("20 Questions").
