= Yan Friis =

Norwegian music journalist and comedian (born 1952)

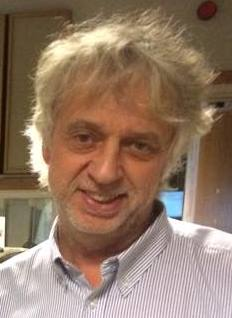
Yan Calmeyer Friis, autumn 2015.

Yan Calmeyer Friis (born 13 August 1952) is a Norwegian comedian, writer, music journalist and radio host.

Friis started his writing career at the Norwegian Labour daily newspaper Arbeiderbladet. After that he worked years at the youth magazine Det Nye where he established himself as a music writer. Since 1993 he has written articles and interviews for the magazine Vi Menn. In 2000 he got the prize "Friends of Thailand" from Tourist Authorities of Thailand.

Friis also worked as a humourist in NRK P1, where he since 1996 co-hosted the radio show Herreavdelingen.

In 2003 Friis started the publishing house Saranya Forlag together with coin dealer Jan Olav Aamlid to publish an updated version of the scientist Carl Bock's work Temples and Elephants from 1884. The book will be published in Thailand by River Books and Saranya Forlag in 2016. Friis wrote the thriller "Hanumans maske" in 2004, published by Saranya Forlag. In 2014 he wrote the book "Beatles og jeg", published by Spetakkel Forlag and Saranya Forlag.

At the local election in 2007 Friis was candidate for the Coastal Party.
