= Aspøy =

Aspøy or Aspøya may refer to:

== Places ==
- Aspøy, Rogaland, an island in Sandnes Municipality in Rogaland county, Norway
- Aspøya, Tingvoll, an island in Tingvoll Municipality in Møre og Romsdal county, Norway
- Aspøya, Trøndelag, an island in Flatanger Municipality in Trøndelag county, Norway
- Aspøya, Ålesund (sometimes spelled Aspøy), an island in Ålesund Municipality in Møre og Romsdal county, Norway

== People ==
- Arild Aspøy (born 1958), a Norwegian journalist, writer, director and editor
