= Ellen Arnstad =

Norwegian magazine editor

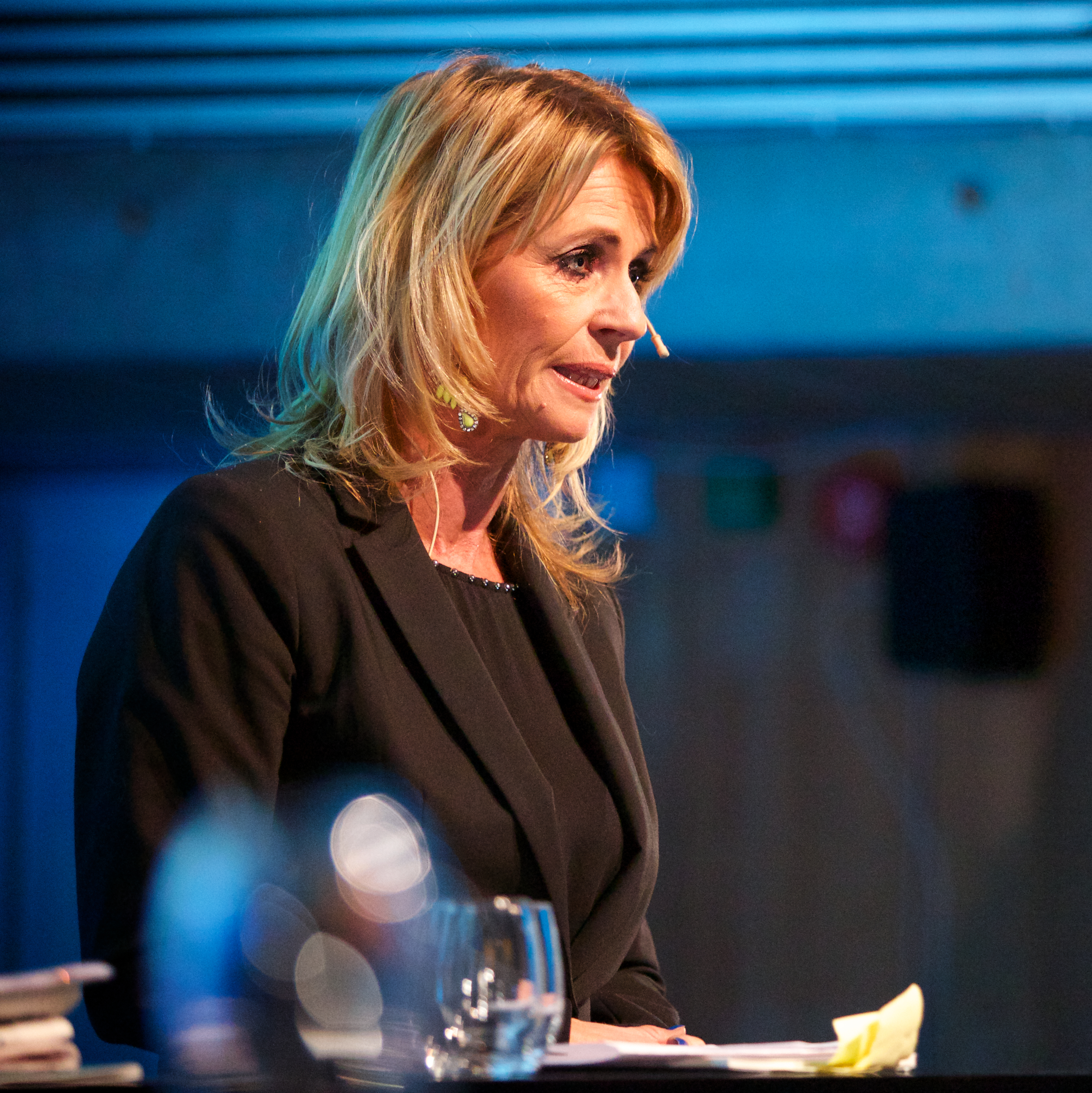
Ellen Arnstad, 2014

Ellen Arnstad (born 20 September 1965) is a Norwegian magazine editor.

== Career ==
Ellen Arnstad worked as a journalist for the newspaper Akers Avis Groruddalen and the magazines Norsk Ukeblad, Nå and Allers before becoming editor-in-chief of the Norwegian women's magazine Henne in 1994. Since 2000 she also managed the publishing company Allers Familie-Journal. She continued to work in Henne until 2011 when she became editor of Se og Hør, until Ulf André Andersen succeeded her as chief editor of Se og Hør in 2017. From 2017 to 2020 Arnstad worked as chief executive in the hotel business.

She has been a member of the board of the Association of Norwegian Editors.
