= Haavik =

Family name

Haavik is an Estonian and Norwegian surname. Notable people with the surname include:

- Gunvor Galtung Haavik (1912–1977), Norwegian diplomat and Soviet spy
- Knut Haavik (1943–2019), Norwegian journalist, writer, and editor
- Lise Haavik (born 1962), Danish–Norwegian singer

== See also ==
- Håvik, village in Sogn og Fjordane, Norway
