= Bratlie =

Bratlie is a surname. Notable people with the surname include:

- Gunnar Bratlie (1918–1990), Norwegian illustrator
- Jens Bratlie (1856–1939), Norwegian attorney and military officer
- Jens Harald Bratlie (born 1948), Norwegian pianist
- Sigurd Bratlie (1905–1996), Norwegian church leader
