= Gunnar Bratlie =

Norwegian illustrator (1918–1990)

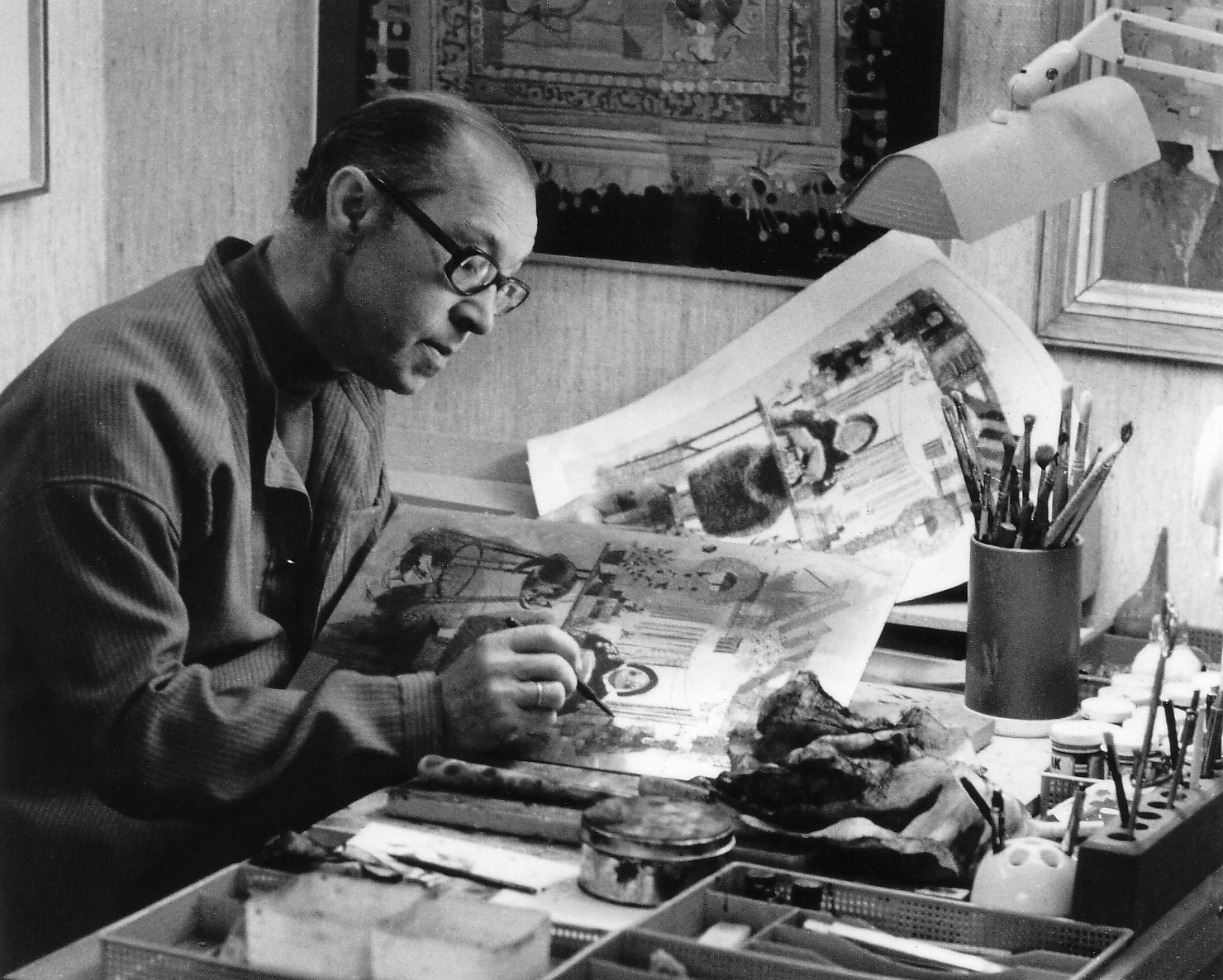
Gunnar Bratlie

Gunnar Bratlie (8 October 1918 – 14 June 1990) was a Norwegian illustrator.

He was born in Fredrikstad, and worked in Oslo and Røros before returning to Fredrikstad in 1981. He is known for his book covers and illustrations, such as the complete works of Selma Lagerlöf and Alexandre Dumas, and the local historical work Fredrikstad bys historie. During the occupation of Norway by Nazi Germany he was imprisoned with editor of Norsk Ukeblad Ernst Ancher-Hanssen for a caricature of Vidkun Quisling in Norsk Ukeblad in February 1943 (#8). The caricature portrayed Quisling as an unsteady ice skating boy, who was being helped to stand up by a man with a Hitler moustache. Bratlie was imprisoned in Grini concentration camp from 19 February 1943 to 22 March 1945. He continued to draw while inside, and a collection of these drawings was published in 1945 under the title Skisser i smug, with a preface written by co-prisoner and professor Francis Bull. Bratlie kept his sketches hidden in a hollow leg of a table, and they were smuggled out of the camp from time to time. Several of his sketches were also published in the two-volume book Griniboken.

His main techniques were etching and serigraphy, but he also did paintings and aquarels. The first exhibition of his art was in Kunstnerforbundet in 1968. In total he exhibited his art about 30 times, with several collective exhibitions. His works have been bought by such institutions as the National Gallery of Norway, the Museo del'arte in Pistoia and the Accademia delle bell'arte in Catania.

From 1978 to 1985 he was granted the State Guarantee Income for Artists. He died in June 1990 and was buried in Glemmen.
