= Gerd Grønvold Saue =

Norwegian writer (1930–2022)

Gerd Grønvold Saue (20 January 1930 – 22 June 2022) was a Norwegian journalist, literary critic, novelist, hymnwriter, and peace activist. Her authorship mainly comprised novels, many of which convey her Christian views.

== Biography ==
She grew up in Lillestrøm, got a cand.mag. degree, and worked many years as a journalist. She spent the years 1954 to 1966 in the weekly magazine Familien, has worked freelance for the Norwegian Broadcasting Corporation and Arbeiderbladet. and been a literary critic in Arbeiderbladet, Vårt Land and Stavanger Aftenblad.

For Familien she wrote several portrait interviews, some of which were collected and published in 1964. She made her literary fiction debut in 1965, with the novel Algirsk vår ('Algerian Spring'). Her 2001 book Elsket og foraktet ('Loved and Loathed') was about Jane Addams, and her 1991 release Fredsfurien ('The Peace Furie') was a biographical novel of Bertha von Suttner. Saue was particularly interested in Suttner's impact on the Nobel Peace Prize. Saue herself served as president of the Norwegian Peace Council and a member of the board of the International Peace Bureau. She chaired the International Fellowship of Reconciliation, Norway from 1965 to 1982 and the Christian Socialists of Norway from 1985 to 1989. She joined the latter organization as early as in 1949.

She also wrote hymns, and is one of the most prolific female hymn writers in Norway. In 1999 she won a millennial hymn competition organized by the Church of Norway. She has been a board member of the Norwegian Authors' Union and the Norwegian Critics' Association.

She lived in Ski.

== See also ==
- List of peace activists
