= Science Illustrated =

Popular science magazine

- January–February 2008 issue
- Editor: Sebastian Relster
- Categories: Popular science
- Frequency: Finland, Sweden, Norway and Denmark; in every 3rd week, Iceland; 14 issues per year, Latvia, Greece, Netherlands and Lithuania; 12 issues per year, Germany; 6 issues per year
- Circulation: 370'000
- First issue: 1984; 42 years ago
- Company: Bonnier Publications International
- ISSN: 0903-5583

Science Illustrated is a multilingual popular science magazine published by the Swedish publisher Bonnier Publications International A/S.

== History and profile ==
Science Illustrated was launched simultaneously in Denmark, Norway and Sweden in 1984. The Finnish version was started in Helsinki, Finland in 1986. The Norwegian version is based in Oslo.

According to official websites, the magazine – with a total circulation of 370,000 copies – is the biggest in the Nordic countries with a focus on nature, technology, medicine and culture.

=== Editions ===
Country	Title	Notes
Australia	Science Illustrated	Australian Media Properties, who also publish technology-focused title Popular Science, launched the Australian version in late 2009.
Denmark	Illustreret Videnskab	Launched in 1984. Circulation of 54,515 copies in 2010 and 52,595 copies in 2011 and 46,812 copies in 2012.
Estonia	Imeline Teadus	
Finland	Tieteen Kuvalehti	Launched in 1986.
Germany	Science Illustrated	Earlier Illustrierte Wissenschaft
Greece	Science Illustrated	
Iceland	Lifandi Vísindi	Launched in 1997.
Latvia	Ilustrētā Zinātne	
Lithuania	Iliustruotasis mokslas	
Netherlands	Wetenschap in Beeld	
Norway	Illustrert Vitenskap	Launched in 1984.
Slovenia		
Sweden	Illustrerad Vetenskap	Launched in 1984. Circulation of 89,400 copies in 2014.
United States	Science Illustrated	Ceased publication in 2013 and subscribers transferred to Popular Science

== See also ==
- List of Norwegian magazines
- List of magazines in Denmark
