= Bente Engesland =

Norwegian magazine editor

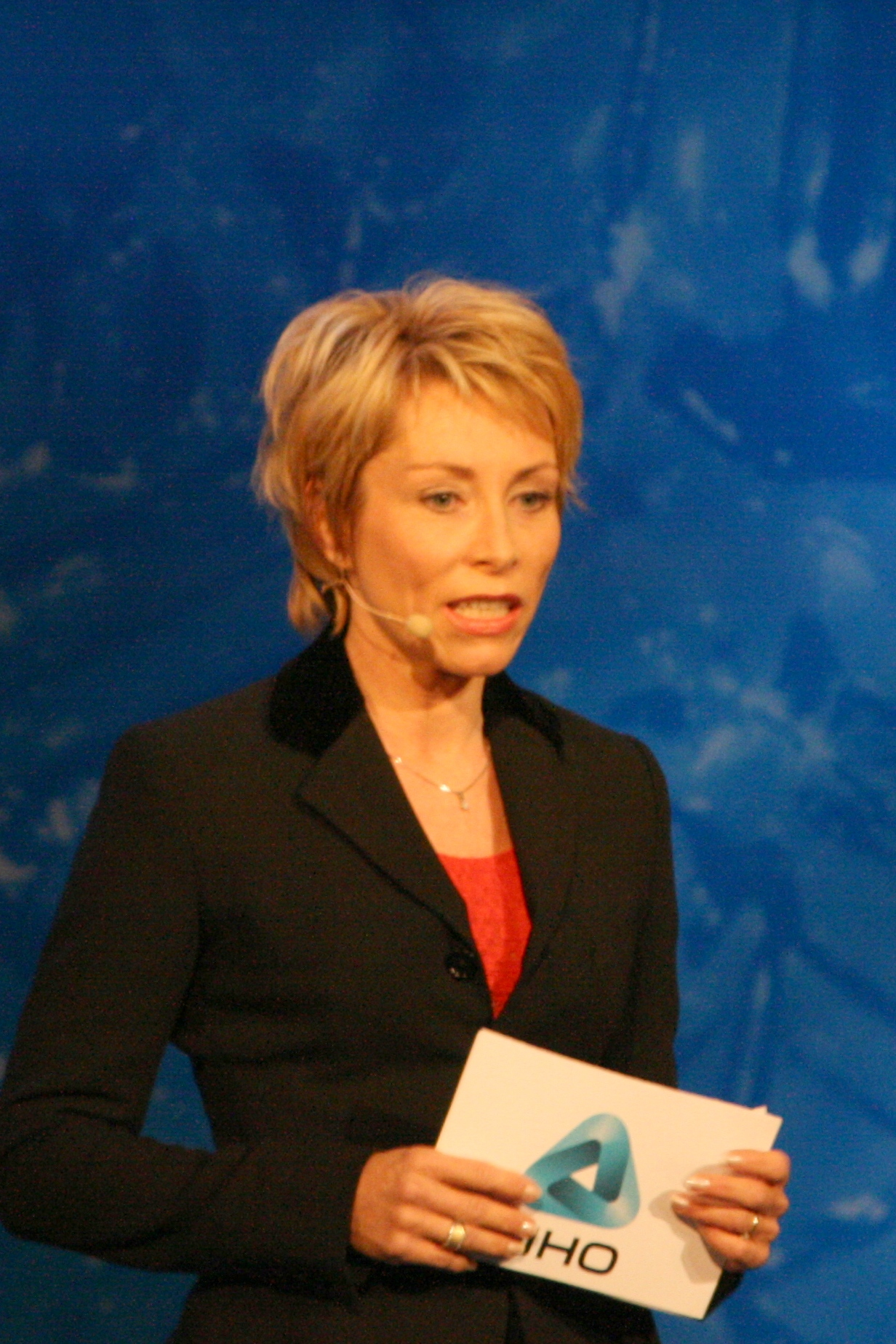
Bente Engesland

Bente Engesland (born 5 April 1962) is a Norwegian magazine editor.

She was the editor-in-chief of Kvinner og Klær from 2005 to 2008. She started her career working part-time in the Norwegian News Agency in 1983, and was a journalist in Aftenposten from 1985 to 1997. She graduated from the University of Oslo as cand.polit. in 1989. She worked in the Norwegian Broadcasting Corporation from 1997 to 2004, and as a consultant at Burston-Marsteller from 2004 to 2005.
