= LevLandlig =

Lifestyle magazine in Norway

- Categories: Lifestyle magazine
- Frequency: Monthly
- Circulation: 34,591 (2022)
- Publisher: Egmont Publishing AS
- Founded: 2000
- Company: Egmont Group
- Country: Norway
- Based in: Oslo
- Language: Norwegian
- Website: LevLandlig

LevLandlig (Norwegian: Living in the Countryside) is a Norwegian monthly lifestyle magazine with a special emphasis on country life. The magazine is one of the few European publications about country living, which is primarily an American and British genre. It also covers interior design.

== Overview ==
The magazine was launched in 2000 with the title Landliv – et godt liv på landet (Norwegian: Country Living – A good life in the countryside). It is part of the Egmont Group and is published monthly by the Egmont Publishing AS. Its former publisher was the Tun Media AS. As of 2010, LevLandlig was published on a bimonthly basis. The headquarters of the magazine is in Oslo.

LevLandlig enjoyed circulation growth in 2012, and sold 34,591 copies in 2022.
