= Norwegian Golf Federation =

Golf governing body in Norway

- Sport: Golf
- Jurisdiction: National
- Abbreviation: NGF
- Founded: 1948
- Affiliation: International Golf Federation (IGF)
- Regional affiliation: European Golf Association (EGA)
- Headquarters: Oslo, Norway

Official website
- www.golfforbundet.no

The Norwegian Golf Federation (Norwegian: Norges Golfforbund, NGF) is the governing body for the sport of golf in Norway.

The NGF was founded in 1948 after an initiative from Bergen GK, Høsbjør GK, Borregaard GK and Oslo GK. It organizes around 100,000 memberships, making it the fifth largest federation in Norwegian sports. Members are spread across around 180 golf clubs, and as of 2020 all Norwegian golf clubs but one were organized by the NGF.

The NGF manages the national golf teams, the national golf championships, and maintains the Rules of Golf in Norwegian. NGF is a member of the European Golf Association (EGA).

== Championships ==
The NGF organizes the following amateur championships for men and women (eligible age in brackets):

- Norwegian Championship (16+)
- Norwegian Matchplay Championship (16+)
- Norwegian Youth Championship (16–19)
- Norwegian Youth Matchplay Championship (16–19)
- Norwegian Junior Championship (13–15)
- Norwegian Junior Matchplay Championship (13–15)
- Norwegian Mid-Amateur Championship (30+)
- Norwegian Senior Championship (50+)
- Norwegian Team Championship (13+)
- Norwegian Junior Team Championship (13–19)

== Notable members ==
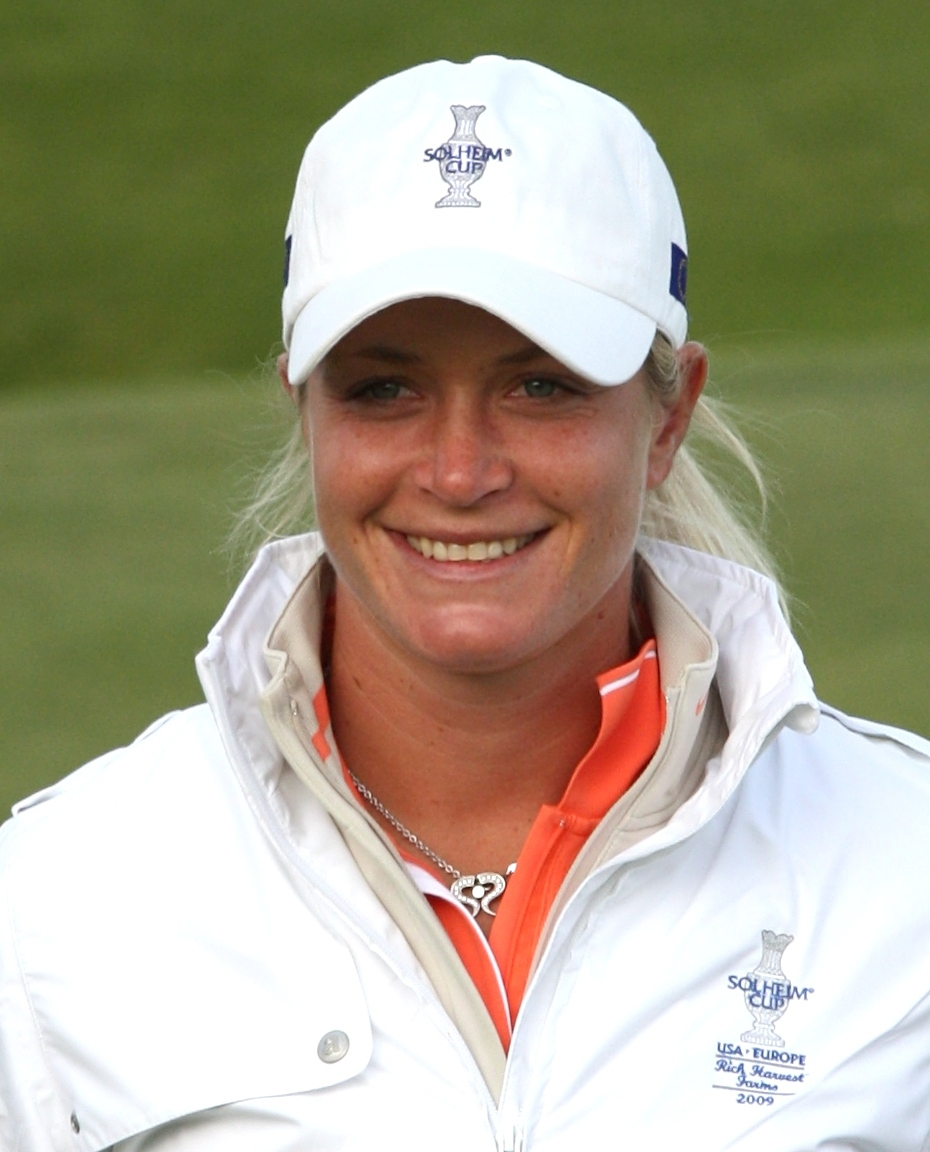
Suzann Pettersen, winner of several majors and #2 in the World Rankings

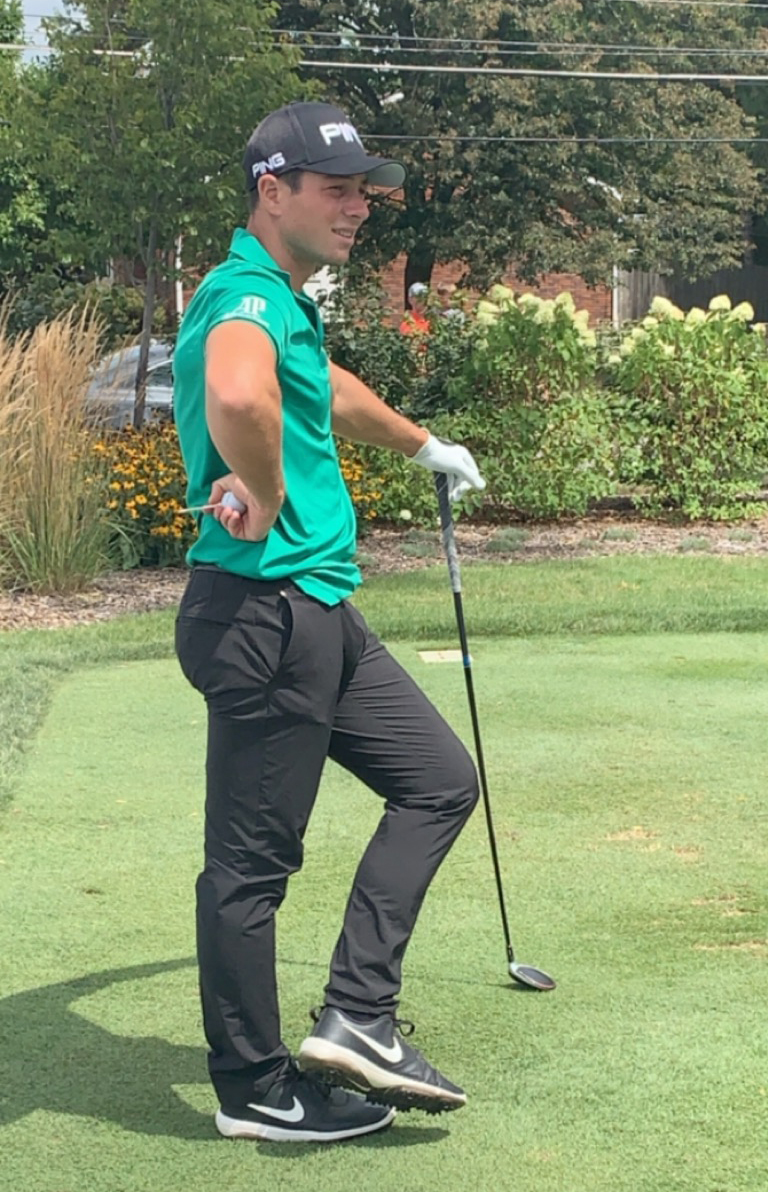
Viktor Hovland, first Norwegian to win on the PGA Tour

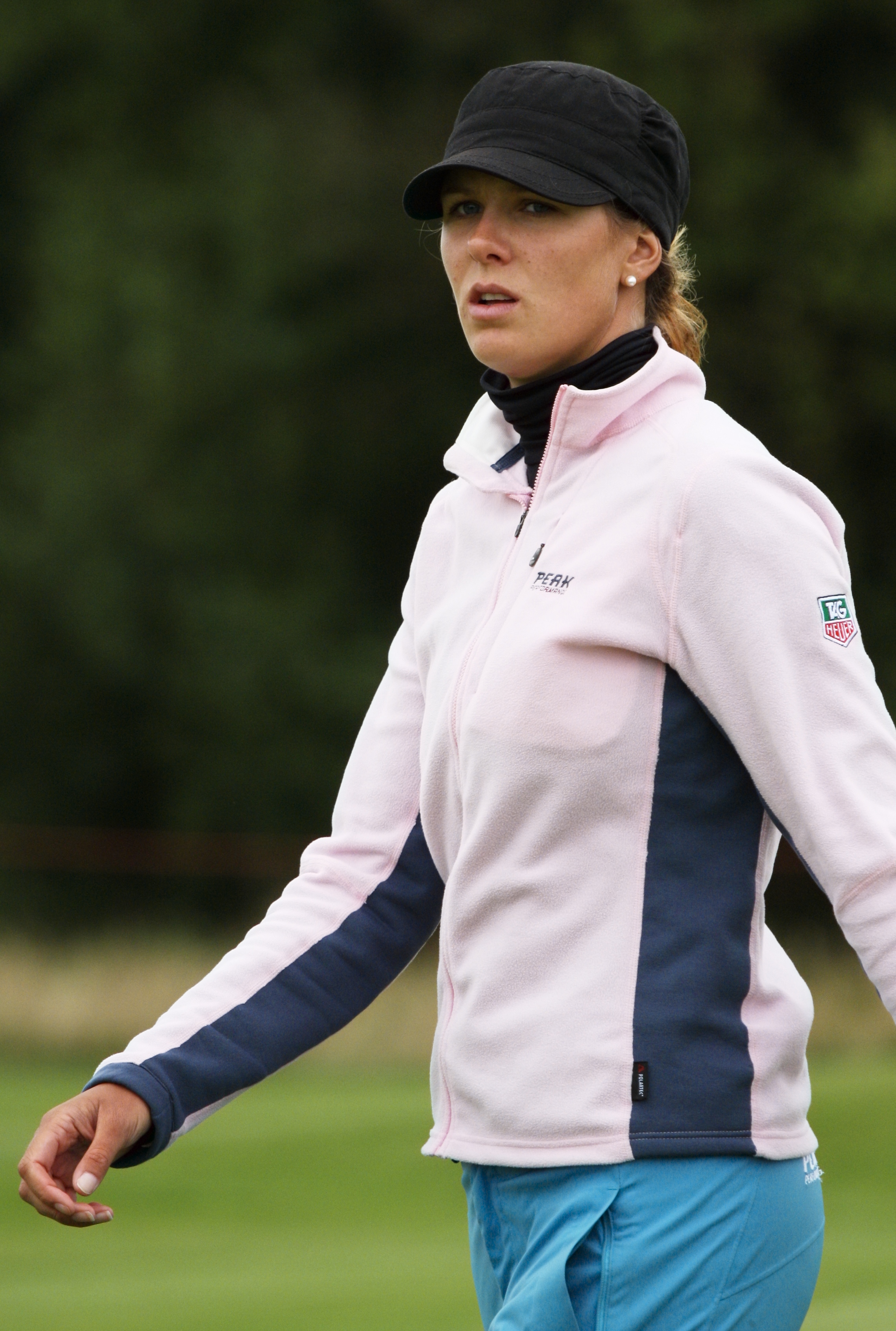
Marianne Skarpnord, winner of over half a dozen LET and ALPG Tour events

== See also ==
- Norsk Golf – magazine distributed to the members of the Norwegian Golf Federation
- Norwegian Open – the leading men's professional golf tournament in Norway
- Ladies Norwegian Open – the leading women's professional golf tournament in Norway
