= Kvinner og Klær =

Norwegian women's magazine

- Editor: Gjyri Helén Werp
- Former editors: Bente Engesland
- Categories: Women's magazine
- Frequency: Weekly
- Founded: 1874; 151 years ago
- Company: Aller Media
- Country: Norway
- Based in: Oslo
- Language: Norwegian
- Website: Official website

Kvinner og Klær (KK, 'Women and Clothes'), is a Norwegian weekly women's magazine published in Oslo, Norway. It is the oldest and largest magazine for women in the country.

== History and profile ==
Kvinner og Klær was launched under the title of Nordisk Mønster-Tidende as a magazine concerning needlework patterns in 1874. In 1940 it was renamed Kvinner og Klær and its profile was modified into a general interest women's magazine. In 1970 its official title was changed to the abbreviation KK.

The magazine, which is headquartered in Oslo, is owned by Aller Media and is published weekly. The editor is Gjyri Helén Werp, who took over for Bente Engesland in 2008.

The target group of the magazine is women in their 30s. In 2003 KK was one of the best-selling two women's magazines in Norway with a circulation of 70,000 copies. The 2010 circulation of the magazine was down to 48,604 copies. Its circulation decreased to 44,017 copies in 2012.

== See also ==
- List of Norwegian magazines
