= Ulf André Andersen =

Norwegian magazine editor

- Born: 1967 (age 58–59); Drammen, Norway
- Occupations: Journalist, magazine editor
- Employers: Dagbladet; Aller Media
- Known for: Chief editor of Se og Hør

Ulf André Andersen (born 1967) is a Norwegian journalist and magazine editor. Since 2017 he has been chief editor of the Norwegian magazine Se og Hør.

== Career ==
Born in Drammen in 1967, Andersen graduated from Journalisthøgskolen i Oslo in 1996. He later took further education in innovation and digital leadership.

He started working as journalist for the newspaper Dagbladet from 1996. From 2008 he worked for the magazine Se og Hør, where he assumed various administrative positions. In 2017 he was appointed chief editor of Se og Hør, succeeding Ellen Arnstad. He resigned as editor of the magazine in January 2026.

His books include Kildeboka. Håndbok for journalister from 2012, written in cooperation with Torgeir Lorentzen. He contributed to the 2025 book Ute av kontroll about the trial of Marius Borg Høiby.

== Personal life ==
Andersen suffered from serious illness (kidney failure), following a climbing expedition in 2017.
