= List of music periodicals indexed by RIPM =

Below is a list of music periodicals treated by RIPM including those available in full-text. Titles are arranged by chronologically by language. FT indicates the full-text of the periodical is available through RIPM. Descriptions of journals and scholarly introductions for most titles are available on RIPM's website.

== Bulgarian ==
Gusla (Plovdiv, Sofia, 1891), FT
Muzikalna misŭl’ / Музикална мисъль (Sofia, 1929), FT
А. С. О.: Периодическо Списание на Академическия Симфониченъ Оркестъръ за Музикална Култура и Критика = O. S. A.: Revue périodique de l’orchestre ... (Sofia, 1934–1935), FT
Muzikalna misŭl’ / Музикална мисъль (Sofia, 1936–1939), FT

== Catalan ==
Revista Musical Catalana (Barcelona, 1904–1923 [-1936]), FT
Fruïcions: Portaveu de l'Associcaió Obrera de Concerts (Barcelona, 1927–1932), FT

== Croatian ==
Gusle (Zagreb, 1892), FT
Glazba (Zagreb, 1893), FT
Sv. Cecilija (Zagreb, 1907–1944)
Muzička Revija: Nezavisni Mjesečnik (Zagreb, 1932)
Muzičke Novine (Zagreb, 1951–1952)
Muzičke Novosti (Zagreb, 1953)

== Czech ==
Dalibor. Hudební časopis s měsiční notovou přílohou (Prague, 1858–1864, 1869)
Slavoj (Prague, 1862–1865), FT
Hudební listy (Prague, 1870–1875), FT
Dalibor. Časopis věnovaný zájmům světské i církevní hudby a zpěváckých spolků českoslov., zároveň pak organ „Matice hudební" (Prague, 1873–1875)
Dalibor. Hudební Listy (Prague, 1879–1923 [-1927]), FT
Hudební Revue (Prague, 1908–1919), FT
Klíč: nezávislá revue soudobé hudby (Prague, 1930–1932)
Smetana: Hudební List (Prague, 1936–1938)

== Danish ==
Tidsskrift for Musik (Copenhagen, 1857–1859), FT
Nordisk Tidsskrift for Musik (Copenhagen, 1871–1873), FT
Musikbladet (Copenhagen, 1884–1895), FT
Skandinaviske Signaler (Copenhagen, 1894–1895), FT
Musik: Tidsskrift for Tonekunst (Copenhagen, 1917–1925), FT

== Dutch ==
Amphion. Een Tijdschrift voor vrienden en beoefenaars der Toonkunst (Groningen, 1818–1822), FT
Muzijkaal Tijdschrift (The Hague, 1836), FT
Nederlandsch Muzikaal Tijdschrift (Utrecht, 1839–1848), FT
Caecilia. Algemeen Muzikaal Tijdschrift van Nederland (Utrecht, Rotterdam, The Hague, 1844–1880), FT
Maanblad voor Muziek: Orgaan der Wagner-Vereeniging te Amsterdam (Amsterdam, 1888–1894), FT
Weekblad voor Muziek (Amsterdam, 1894–1909), FT
Caecilia. Maanblad voor muziek (Amsterdam, 1903–1917), FT
Jaarboek Peter Benoit (Antwerp, 1904–1907), FT
Het Muziekcollege (Haarlem, 1913–1917), FT
Caecilia en Het Muziekcollege: Algemeen Toonkunstblad voor Groot-Nederland (Amsterdam, 1917–1933), FT
Muziek-warande: tijdschrift voor muziekminnende Vlamingen (Brussels, 1922–1932), FT
De Muziek (Amsterdam, 1926–1933), FT
Maandblad voor Hedendaagsche Muziek: Orgaan van de Nederlandsche Vereeniging voor Hedendaagsche Muziek (Amsterdam, 1931–1933), FT
Caecilia en de muziek (Bussum, Hilversum, 1933–1944), FT

== English (Canada) ==
The Arion (Toronto, 1880–1881), FT
Arcadia (Montreal, 1892–1893), FT
The Violin (Toronto, 1906–1907), FT
Musical Canada (Toronto, 1907–1932), FT
The Canadian Journal of Music (Toronto, 1914–1919), FT
Canadian Review of Music and Other Arts (Toronto, 1942–1948)
Canadian Music Journal (Toronto, 1956–1962)

== English (UK) ==
The New Musical Magazine, Review, and Register (London, 1809–1810), FT
The Quarterly Musical Magazine and Review (London, 1818–1828), FT
The English Musical Gazette; or, Monthly Intelligencer (London, 1819), FT
The Harmonicon (London, 1823–1833), FT
The Musical Magazine (London, 1835), FT
The Musical World (London, 1836–1891), FT
+The Musical World and Dramatic Observer (1890–1891), FT
The Musical Journal (London, 1840), FT
The Musical Examiner (London, 1842–1844), FT
The Musical Times (London, 1844–1900)
The Musical Gazette (London, 1856–1859)
The Musical Standard (London, 1862–1871 [First Series]), FT
The Orchestra (London, 1863–1874 [First series])
The Musical Monthly and Repertoire of Literature, the Drama, and the Arts (London, 1864–1865)
The Musical Standard: A Newspaper for Musicians, Professional and Amateur (London, 1871–1893), FT
The Monthly Musical Record (London, 1871–1960), FT
Concordia (London, 1875–1876), FT
The Lute (London, 1883–1899)
The Quarterly Musical Review (Manchester, 1885–1888), FT
The Meister (London, 1888–1894)
The New Quarterly Musical Review (London, 1893–1896)
The Musician (London, 1897), FT
The Chord: A Quarterly Devoted to Music (London, 1899–1900), FT
The Musical Antiquary (Oxford, 1909–1913), FT
Chamber Music (London, 1913–1916)
The Chesterian (London, 1915–1940, 1947–1961)
The Musician (London, 1919–1921)
The Scottish Musical Magazine (Edinburgh 1919–1931)
+The Scottish Musical Magazine and Scottish Drama (1929–1931)
The Sackbut (London, 1920–1934)
Fanfare: A musical causerie (London, 1921–1922), FT
The Dominant (London, 1927–1929)
+The Gamut (1927–1929)
Hinrichsen's Musical Yearbook (London, 1944–1961)
+The Music Book (1950–1961)
The Penguin Music Magazine (Harmondsworth, 1946–1949)
Music Survey (London, 1947–1952)
+Music-Journal (1947)
Music Today (London, 1949)
The Score (London, 1949–1961)
+Music (Harmondsworth, 1950–1952)
Musical Renaissance (London, 1950)
Music (Harmondsworth, 1950–1952)
Foyer: A Quarterly of Music, Opera and Ballet (London, 1958–1968)
Die Reihe [English-language edition] (London, 1958–1968)

== English (US) ==
The Euterpeiad, or Musical Intelligencer (Boston, 1820–1823), FT
+The Euterpeiad, or Musical Intelligencer & Ladies Gazette (1821–1822), FT
The Euterpeiad (New York, 1830–1831), FT
American Musical Journal (New York, 1834–1835), FT
The Musical Magazine (New York, 1835–1837), FT
Boston Musical Gazette (Boston, 1838–1839), FT
The Musical Review and Record of Musical Science, Literature, and Intelligence (New York, 1838–1839), FT
The Musical Magazine (New York, 1839–1842), FT
Boston Eoliad (Boston, 1840–1841), FT
Musical Reporter (Boston, 1841), FT
Boston Musical Review (Boston, 1845), FT
The Message Bird (New York, 1849–1852), FT
+Journal of the Fine Arts (1851–1852), FT
+The Musical World (1852), FT
Saroni's Musical Times (New York, 1849–1852), FT
+The Musical Times (1851–1852)
The Choral Advocate and Singing Class Journal (New York, 1850–1851), FT
American Monthly Music Review, and Choir Singers' Companion (New York, 1850–1851), FT
The Musical Review and Choral Advocate (New York, 1852–1853), FT
The New York Musical World (New York, 1852–1860), FT
+The Musical World and New York Musical Times (1852–1854)
+The Musical World (1854)
+The Musical World (1858–1860)
+The Musical World and Times (1852–1854)
+Musical World. A Weekly Journal for "Heavenly Music's Earthly Friends" (1855)
+Musical World. A Journal for "Heavenly Music's Earthly Friends" (1855)
Dwight's Journal of Music (Boston, 1852–1881), FT
New York Musical Review and Choral Advocate (New York, 1854), FT
The Musical Gazette (New York, 1854–1855)
The New York Musical Review and Gazette (New York, 1855–1860), FT
The New York Musical Pioneer [and Choirster's Budget] (New York, 1855–1867), FT
The Musical Review and Musical World (New York, 1860–1864), FT
Watson's Art Journal (New York, 1864–1874)
+Watson's Weekly Art Journal (1864–1866)
+The American Art Journal (1866–1867)
New York Weekly Review (New York, 1865–1873), FT
The Concordia (Chicago, 1866–1867), FT
New York Musical Gazette (New York, 1866–1874), FT
The Musical Independent (Chicago, 1868–1873), FT
The Metronome (Boston, 1871–1874), FT
Church's Musical Visitor (Cincinnati, 1871–1897)
+The Musical Visitor (1884–1897)
The Music Trade Review (New York, 1875–1879), FT
Musician and Artist (Boston, 1876), FT
The Music Trade Review (New York, 1875–1879), FT
Musician and Artist (Boston, 1876), FT
The Review: With which is incorporated the Music Trade Review (New York, 1878), FT
The Musical Times and Music Trade Review (New York, 1879), FT
Musical and Dramatic Times and Music Trade Review (New York, 1879–1880), FT
The Musical Review (New York, 1879–1881)
Musical and Sewing Machine Courier (New York, 1880), FT
Musical and Sewing-Machine Gazette (New York, 1880), FT
The Musical Courier (New York, 1880–1881, 1883–1926, −1961 forthcoming), FT
The Musical and Dramatic Courier (New York, 1880–1882), FT
The Musical Herald (Boston, 1880–1893), FT
+Boston Musical Herald (1889–1892), FT
+Musical Herald of the United States (1892–1893), FT
Music: A Review (New York, 1882), FT
Music and Drama (New York, 1882, 1883), FT
Weekly Music & Drama (New York, 1883), FT
The Keynote (New York, 1883–1897), FT
Music: A Monthly Magazine (Chicago, 1891–1902), FT
Freund's Weekly (New York, 1893), FT
Freund's Musical Weekly (New York, 1893–1896), FT
The Looker-On (New York, 1895–1897), FT
Musical America (New York, 1898–1899, 1905–1922 [–1964]), FT
Doings of the Musicians: A Monthly Summary of the Musical World (Boston, 1900), FT
The Musical World (Boston, 1901–1904), FT
The New Music Review and Church Music Review (New York, 1901–1935), FT
+The Church Music Review (1901–1904)
The Negro Music Journal (Washington, D.C., 1902–1903), FT
The Musical Observer (New York, 1907–1931), FT
The Crescendo (Boston, 1909–1927), FT
Pacific Coast Musician (Los Angeles, 1911–1948), FT
Harvard Musical Review (Cambridge, 1912–1916), FT
Century Opera Weekly (New York, 1913)
+The Opera (1913)
Musical Advance (New York, 1913–1948), FT
International Music and Drama (New York, 1914–1916), FT
Opera Magazine (New York, 1914–1916), FT
Christensen's Ragtime Review (Chicago, 1914–1918), FT
Music and Musicians / Musica e musicisti (New York, 1916–1922), FT
+Ragtime Review (1917–1918), FT
Melody (Boston, 1918–1930), FT
Eolian Review (New York, 1921–1932), FT
+Eolus (1924–1932), FT
The Baton (New York, 1922–1932), FT
Pro-Musica Quarterly (New York, 1923–1929), FT
+The Franco-American Musical Society Bulletin (1923–1925), FT
Music: Illustrated Monthly Review (New York, 1924), FT
Modern Music (New York, 1924–1946), FT
+The League of Composers Review (1924–1925), FT
Fortnightly Musical Review (New York, 1928), FT
Metronome (New York, 1932–1961), FT
Tempo (Los Angeles, 1933–1940), FT
Christensen's Modern Musical Monthly (Chicago, 1934), FT
Melody News (New York, 1934–1939), FT
Musical Mercury (New York, 1934–1939), FT
Down Beat (Chicago, 1934–1963), FT
Music Vanguard (New York, 1935), FT
Music Front (New York, 1935)
Collegiate Swing (Lexington, VA, 1938), FT
The Cat's Meow (Detroit, 1938), FT
Floy Floy (Chicago, 1938), FT
Upbeat (Chicago, 1938–1939), FT
HRS Society Rag (New York, 1938–1941), FT
Swing: The Guide to Modern Music (Detroit, New York, 1938–1941), FT
Bulletin of the American Composers Alliance (New York, 1938, 1952–1963), FT
+ACA Bulletin (1952–1963), FT
Bandmagazine (New York, 1939), FT
Bandwagon (New York, 1939), FT
Bandstand (New York, 1939), FT
Swing Music (New York, 1939), FT
Jazz Information (New York, 1939–1941), FT
Music and Rhythm (Chicago, 1940–1942), FT
Jam Session (New York, 1941), FT
Swing: Devoted to Modern Music (New York, 1941), FT
The Baton (Detroit, 1941–1943), FT
Dance Band Album (Greenwich, CT, 1942), FT
Jazz Notes (Newark, NJ, 1942), FT
All-American Band Leaders (Springfield, MA, 1942–1943), FT
Jazz [First Series] (Forest Hills Station, New York, 1942–1943), FT
Jazz Quarterly (Kingsville, TX, Chicago, 1942–1944), FT
The Record Changer (Washington, DC, Fairfax, VA, New York, 1942–1957), FT
The Music Dial (New York, 1943–1945), FT
Band Leaders (Mount Morriss, IL, 1943–1946), FT
The Jazz Record (New York, 1943–1947), FT
The Capitol News from Hollywood (Hollywood, CA, 1943–1952), FT
Recordiana (Norwich, CT, 1944), FT
American Jazz Monthly (Whitestone, NY, 1944–1945), FT
Jazz [Second Series] (New York, 1944–1945), FT
Jazette (Boston, 1944–1945), FT
The New Baton (Dunellen, NJ, 1944–1945), FT
The Needle (Jackson Heights, NY, 1944–1945), FT
The Jazz Session (Chicago, 1944–1945), FT
Esquire's Jazz Book (Chicago, New York, 1944–1947), FT
Basin Street (New Orleans, 1945–1946), FT
Platter Chatter (Seattle, 1945–1947), FT
American Jazz Review (New York, 1945–1947), FT
Musicology (Middlebury, VT; New York, 1945–1949)
In the Groove (Camden, NJ, 1945–1949), FT
Clef (Santa Monica, CA, 1946), FT
Disc: The Record Magazine (Mount Morris, IL 1946), FT
Hollywood Note (Hollywood, CA, 1946), FT
Band Leaders and Record Review (Mount Morris, IL 1946–1947), FT
Jazzways (Cincinnati, New York, 1946–1947), FT
Rhythm (New York, 1946–1947), FT
Radio and Record Stars (Mount Morris, IL, 1947), FT
Composer's News Record (New York, 1947–1949), FT
Good Diggin' (Portland, 1947–1949), FT
The Wheel (Kannapolis, NC, 1948), FT
Jazzfinder (New Orleans, 1948–1949), FT
Jazz Discounter (Evansville, IN, 1948–1951), FT
Oh! Play that Thing (San Francisco, 1948–1952), FT
Playback (New Orleans, 1949–1952), FT
Jazz Club Bulletin (New Orleans, 1950), FT
Jass Beat (Schenectady, 1950), FT
Jazz: The Metronome Yearbook (New York, 1950–1959), FT
The Second Line (New Orleans, 1950–1976), FT
Music News (Hollywood, CA, 1952), FT
Music Views (Hollywood, CA, 1952–1959), FT
Rhythm and Blues (Derby, CT, 1952–1964), FT
Theme (North Hollywood, CA, 1953–1957), FT
The Jazz Report (Creve Coeur, MO, St. Louis, Chicago, 1953–1960), FT
The Juilliard Review (New York, 1954–1962), FT
Climax (New Orleans, 1955–1956), FT
Record Whirl (Chicago 1955–1956), FT
GTJ and CR News (Los Angeles, 1955–1961), FT
Record Research (Brooklyn, NY, 1955–1977), FT
American Jazz Annual (New York, 1956), FT
Encyclopedia Yearbook of Jazz (New York, 1956), FT
Jazz Digest (Philadelphia, 1956), FT
Jazz New York (New York, 1956), FT
Jazz Today (New York, 1956–1957), FT
Down Beat Music [Yearbook] (Chicago, 1957–1963), FT
Jazz Notes (Indianapolis, 1957–1963), FT
New Yearbook of Jazz (New York, 1958), FT
Jazz: A Quarterly of American Music (Berkeley, CA, 1958–1960), FT
The Jazz Review (New York, 1958–1961), FT
The Lyric. A Review of Serious Music (Los Angeles, 1958–1967)
Metronome – Music U.S.A (New York, 1959), FT
Jazz Report (Ventura, CA, 1960–1974), FT
Music Memories (Birmingham, AL, 1961–1962), FT
Quarter Notes (Fresno, CA, 1962), FT
ASCAP Jazz Notes (New York, 1962–1965), FT
Hip (Milwaukee, WI, McLean, VA, 1962–1971), FT
Music Memories Quarterly (Birmingham, AL, 1963), FT
Music Memories Monthly (Birmingham, AL, 1963), FT
Music Memories and Jazz Report (Birmingham, Al 1963–1965), FT
The Jazz Register (San Diego, 1965), FT
Change (Detroit, 1965–1966), FT
78 Quarterly (Brooklyn, NY, Key West, FL, 1967–2002), FT
The New Regime (Chicago, 1969), FT
The Jazz Blast (Mt. Ephraim, NJ, 1970–1973), FT
Whiskey, Women, and... (Haverhill, MA, 1971–1989), FT
Jazz Digest (McLean, VA 1972–1974), FT
The Mississippi Rag (Minneapolis, MN, 1973–2006), FT
Mecca (New Orleans, 1974), FT
The Soul and Jazz Record (Hollywood, CA, 1975–1977), FT
CRC Newsletter (Decatur, GA, 1975–1987), FT
The Grackle (Brooklyn, NY, 1976–1979), FT
Jazz Magazine (Northport, NY, 1976–1980), FT
Cadence (Redwood, NY, 1976–2000), FT
Big Apple Jazz (New York, 1977), FT
Riffs: Jazz and Blues Review Magazine (Arlington, TX 1977–1978), FT
Disc'ribe (Ann Arbor, MI 1980–1982), FT
Gene Lees Jazzletter (Ojai, CA, 1981–2008), FT
CRC Jazz Journal (New Orleans, 1987–1989), FT
Jazzbeat (New Orleans, 1989–2010), FT
Detroit Jazz Monthly (Detroit, 1995–1997), FT
Detroit Jazz (Detroit, 1997–2000), FT

== French ==
Revue musicale (Paris, 1827–1835), FT
Le Pianiste (Meudon and Vaugirard, 1833–1835), FT
Le Ménestrel (Paris, 1833–1940), FT
La Gazette musicale de Paris (Paris, 1834–1835), FT
La Revue et Gazette musicale de Paris (Paris, 1835–1880), FT
La France musicale (Paris, 1837–1870), FT
Le Novateur: Echo des arts (Antwerp, 1838–1839), FT
La Revue Musicale Belge: Journal des gens du monde, des artistes, des théatres et des modes (Brussels, Anvers, 1840–1841)
La Belgique musicale (Brussels, 1841–1859)
La Musique: Gazette de la France musicale (Paris, 1849–1850), FT
Le Diapason. Revue musicale de Bruxelles (Brussels, 1850–1852), FT
Le Colporteur: journal de la littérature, des théâtres et des beaux-arts (Paris, 1854), FT
La Hollande musicale (The Hague, 1854–1855, 1866–1867), FT
Le guide musical (Brussels, 1855–1918), FT
La Presse théâtrale (Paris, 1855–1865), FT
Bulletin de la Revue de la musique ancienne et moderne (Paris, 1856)
Revue de la musique ancienne et moderne (Paris, 1856)
L'Art musical (Paris, 1860–1870; 1872–1894)
Les Beaux-arts (Montreal, 1863–1864), FT
La Presse musicale (Paris, 1866–1892), FT
Le Canada musical: Revue artistique et littéaire (Montreal, 1866–1867, 1875–1881)
La Chronique musicale (Paris, 1873–1876), FT
La Chanson (Paris, 1878–1880), FT
La Renaissance musicale (Paris, 1881–1883), FT
La Musique populaire: Journal hebdomadaire illustré (Paris, 1881–1885), FT
L’Indépendance musicale et dramatique (Paris, 1887–1888), FT
Le Journal musical: Bulletin international critique de la Bibliographie Musicale (Paris, 1896–1898)
Revue internationale de musique (Paris, 1898–1899), FT
La Revue musicale (Paris, 1901–1912), FT
+La Revue d'histoire et de critique musicales (1901–1902)
Musica(Paris, 1902–1914), FT
Revue musicale de Lyon (Lyon, 1903–1912), FT
Le Mercure musical (Paris, 1905–1906), FT
S.I.M. Revue musicale mensuelle (Paris, 1907–1914)
La Vie Musicale: Organe officiel, pour la Suisse romande, de l'Association des Musiciens suisses (Lausanne, Geneva, 1907–1914)
L'Année musicale (Paris, 1911–1913), FT
Revue française de musique (Lyon, 1912–1914), FT
La Musique pendant la guerre (Paris, 1915–1917), FT
Théâtres et concerts (Paris, 1916–1917)
La Revue musicale (Paris, 1920–1940), FT
Revue Pleyel (Paris, 1923–1927), FT
Musique: Revue mensuelle de critique, d'histoire, d'esthétique et d'information musicales (Paris, 1927–1930), FT
Revue internationale de musique et de danse (Paris, 1927–1931), FT
Appogiature, revue d'études et d'informations musicales (Paris, 1931–1933)
La Sirène (Brussels, 1937–1939, 1945–1946)
+Syrinx (1938–1939, 1946)
Revue internationale de musique (Brussels, 1938–1940, 1950–1952)
La Vie musicale angevine (Paris, 1942–1947)
+La Vie angevine: Musicale, artistique, littéraire (1943–1947)
La Revue musicale de France (Paris, 1946–1947)
Contrepoints (Paris, 1946–1953)
Polyphonie (Paris, 1947–1950, 1956), FT
Domaine musicale (Paris, 1954)

== German ==
Kritische Briefe über die Tonkunst (Berlin, 1759–1763), FT
Wöchentliche Nachrichten und Anmerkungen die Musik betreffend (Leipzig, 1766–1770), FT
Musikalische Real-Zeitung (Speier [Speyer], 1788–1790), FT
Musikalisches Wochenblatt / Musikalische Monatsschrift (Berlin, 1791–1792), FT
+Studien für Tonkünstler und Musikfreunde (1791–1792)
+Musikalische Monatschrift (1792)
Berlinische musikalische Zeitung. Historischen und kritischen Inhalts (Berlin, 1793–1794), FT
Jahrbuch der Tonkunst von Wien und Prag (Vienna, 1796)
Allgemeine musikalische Zeitung (Leipzig, 1798–1848), FT
Berlinische Musikalische Zeitung (Berlin, 1805–1806), FT
Musicalische Notizen (Linz, 1812), FT
Musicalische Zeitung für die österreichischen Staaten (Linz, 1812–1813), FT
Wiener allgemeine Musikzeitung (Vienna, 1813), FT
Allgemeine musikalische Zeitung, mit besonderer Rücksicht auf den österreichischen Kaiserstaat (Vienna, 1817–1824), FT
+Wiener allgemeine musikalische Zeitung, mit besonderer Rücksicht auf den österreichischen Kaiserstaat (1824)< br/> Berliner allgemeine musikalische Zeitung (Berlin, 1824–1830), FT
Cäcilia, eine Zeitschrift für die musikalische Welt (Mainz, 1824–1848), FT
Monatsbericht der Gesellschaft der Musikfreunde des Österreichischen Kaiserstaates (Vienna, 1829–1830), FT
Eutonia (Breslau/Berlin, 1829–1833, 1835, 1837), FT
Berliner musikalische Zeitung (Berlin, 1833), FT
Neue Zeitschrift für Musik (Leipzig, 1834–1844), FT
+Neue Leipziger Zeitschift für Musik (1834)
Allgemeine Wiener Musik-Zeitung (Vienna, 1841–1848), FT
+Wiener allgemeine Musik-Zeitung (1845–1848)
Euterpe: Ein musikalisches Monatsblatt (Erfurt, Leipzig, 1841–1855, 1857–1884), FT
Signale für die musikalische Welt (Leipzig, 1843–1883 [–1943, remainder forthcoming]), FT
Berliner musikalische Zeitung (Berlin, 1844–1847), FT
Neue Berliner Musikzeitung (Berlin, 1847–1896), FT
Rheinische Musik-Zeitung für Kunstfreunde und Künstler (Cologne, 1850–1859)
Süddeutsche Musik-Zeitung (Mainz, 1852–1869), FT
Niederrheinische Musik-Zeitung (Cologne, 1853–1867), FT
Fliegende Blätter für Musik (Leipzig, 1855–1857), FT
Monatschrift für Theater und Musik (Vienna, 1855–1865)
+Recensionen und Mittheilungen über Theater und Musik (1859–1865)
Deutsche Musik-Zeitung (Vienna, 1860–1862), FT
Schlesische Theater-Zeitung (Breslau, 1863–1864), FT
+Breslauer Theater-Zeitung (1864)
Jahrbücher für Musikalische Wissenschaft (Leipzig, 1863–1867)
Allgemeine musikalische Zeitung (Leipzig, 1863–1882), FT
+Leipziger allgemeine musikalische Zeitung (1866–1867)
Musikalisches Wochenblatt: Organ für Tonkünstler und Musikfreunde (Leipzig, 1870–1910), FT
Bunte Blätter: Skizzen und Studien für Freunde der Musik und der bildenden kunst (Leipzig, 1872, 1874), FT
Bayreuther Blätter (Bayreuth, 1878–1914 [–1939]), FT
Monatshefte für Musikgeschichte (Berlin, 1879–1905), FT
Musik-Welt (Berlin, 1880–1882), FT
Neue Musik-Zeitung (Cologne; Stuttgart, 1880–1928), FT
Musikalisches Centralblatt (Leipzig, 1881–1884), FT
Kastner's Wiener Musikalische Zeitung (Vienna, 1885–1888), FT
+Musikalische Chronik (1887–1888)
Vierteljahrsschrift für Musikwissenschaft (Leipzig, 1885–1894)
Leipziger Konzertsaal (Leipzig, 1895–1900), FT
+Die redenden Künste (1895–1900)
Neue musikalische Presse (Vienna, Leipzig, 1895–1908), FT
Zeitschrift der Internationalen Musik-Gesellschaft (Leipzig, 1899–1914), FT
Die Musik (Berlin, Leipzig, Stuttgart, 1901–1915, 1923–1943), FT
Neue musikalische Rundschau (Munich, 1908), FT
Wiener Zeitschrift für Musik (Vienna, 1908), FT
Der Merker (Vienna, 1909–1922), FT
Musikpädagogische-Zeitschrift: Organ des Oesterreichischen Musikpädagogischen Verbandes (Vienna, 1912–1931)
Musik-Archiv (Leipzig, 1914), FT
Musikalischer Kurier (Vienna, 1919–1922), FT
Musikblätter des Anbruch (Vienna, 1919–1937)
+Anbruch (1929–1937)
Melos (Berlin, 1920–1934)
Der Auftakt(Prague, 1920–1938), FT
Der Tonwille (Vienna, Leipzig, 1921–1924), FT
Musikbote (Vienna, 1924–1926)
Pult und Taktstock (Vienna, 1924–1930)
25 Jahre neue Musik: Jahrbuch der Universal-Edition (Vienna, 1926)
Musik und Gesellschaft (Mainz, 1930–1931)
23. Eine Wiener Musikzeitschrift (Vienna, 1932–1937)
Zeitschrift für vergleichende Musikwissenschaft (Berlin, 1933–1935)
Musica Viva (Brussels, Rome, London, and Zurich, 1936)
Musikblätter der Sudetendeutschen (Brno [Brünn], 1936–1938)
Neue Musik-Zeitschrift (Munich, 1946–1949)
Stimmen: Monatsblätter für Musik (Berlin, 1947–1950)
Gravesaner Blätter (Mainz, 1955–1966)
+Gravesano Review (1957–1966)

== Greek ==
Musike Epitheoresis [Μουσική επιθεώρησις] (Athens, 1921–1922), FT
Nea Phorminx (Athens, 1921–1923), FT
Musika Chronika [Μουσικά Χρονικά] (Athens, 1925, 1928–1934)
Musike Zoe [Μουσική Ζωή] (Athens, 1930–1931)

== Hungarian ==
Zenészeti Lapok (Budapest, 1860–1876), FT
Zenészeti Közlöny (Budapest, 1882), FT
Zenelap (Budapest, 1885–1912), FT
Zenevilág (Budapest, 1890–1891), FT
Zeneirodalmi Szemle – Müvészeti Lapok (Budapest, 1894–1896)
Magyar dal-és Zeneközlöny (Budapest, 1895–1910), FT

== Italian ==
International Music and Drama (New York, 1914–1916), FT
Music and Musicians / Musica e musicisti (New York, 1916–1922)
L'Ape Italiana (Milan, 1819, 1822–1825), FT
I Teatri (Milan, 1827–1831), FT
Il Censore universale dei teatri (Milan, 1829–1838), FT
Il Barbiere di Siviglia (Milan, 1832–1834), FT
L'Apatista: Giornale de Teatri e Varietá (Venice, 1834–1837), FT
Il Figaro (Milan, 1835–1848), FT
Il Pirata (Milan, Torino, 1835–1848)
Strenna Teatrale Europea (Milan, 1838–1848), FT
Il Corriere dei teatri (Milan, 1839–1840), FT
Gazzetta musicale di Milano (Milan, 1842–1862, 1866–1902), FT
L’Italia musicale (Milan, 1847–1859), FT
+L'Italia libera (1848), FT
L'Osservatorio (Bologna, 1850–1852), FT
Gazzetta musicale di Napoli (Naples, 1852–1868), FT
Gazzetta musicale di Firenze (Florence, 1853–1855), FT
L'arpa (Bologna, 1850–1852), FT
Il Trovatore (Milan, Turin, 1854–1910), FT
La Musica (Naples, 1855), FT
Il Teatro (Turin, 1856), FT
L’Armonia (Florence, 1856–1859), FT
La Musica (Naples, 1857–1859), FT
Boccherini (Florence, 1862–1882), FT
Giornale della Societá del Quartetto di Milano (Milan, 1864–1865)
Il Mondo Artistico (Milan, 1867–1903), FT
Napoli musicale (Naples, 1868–1886), FT
Il Palestrina: Periodico Musicale Ecclesiastico (Rome, 1869–1870), FT
La Melodia (Padova, 1869–1870), FT
Il Progresso musicale (Rome, 1876), FT
La Musica (Naples, 1876–1878; 1883–1885), FT
Il Teatro illustrato (Milan, 1880–1892), FT
+Il Teatro illustrato e la Musica popolare (1886–1892), FT
Archivio Musicale (Naples, 1882–1884), FT
La Musica popolare (Milan, 1882–1885), FT
Paganini (Genoa, 1887–1891), FT
Rivista musicale italiana (Turin, Milan, 1894–1932, 1936–1943, 1946–1955), FT
La Cronaca musicale (Pesaro, 1896–1917), FT
Musica e musicisti (Milan, 1902–1905), FT
Ars et labor: Musica e musicisti (Milan, 1906–1912), FT
Vita musicale (Milan, 1911–1915), FT
Harmonia. Rivista italiana di musica (Rome, 1913–1914), FT
La Riforma musicale (Alessandria, Turin, 1913–1919), FT
L'arte pianistica (Naples, 1914–1925), FT
Ars Nova. Pubblicazione della Società Italiana di Musica Moderna (Rome, 1917–1919), FT
La Critica musicale (Florence, 1918–1923), FT
Musica d'oggi (Milan, 1919–1942)
Il Pianoforte (Turin, 1920–1927), FT
Il Pensiero musicale (Bologna, 1921–1929), FT
La Cultura musicale (Bologna, 1922–1923), FT
Musica e scena (Milan, 1924–1926), FT
Note d'archivio per la storia musicale (Rome, 1924–1927, 1930–1943), FT
Vita musicale italiana (Naples, 1926–1928) Rassegna Dorica (Milan, 1929–1942)
Ricordiana (Milan, 1955–1957), FT
Incontri musicali (Milan, 1956–1960)
Musica d'oggi (Nuova serie) (Milan, 1958–1965)

== Norwegian ==
Nordisk musik-tidende (Christiania [Oslo], 1880–1892), FT
Orkestertidende (Christiania [Oslo], 1892–1894), FT

== Polish ==
Tygodnik Muzyczny (Warsaw, 1820–1821), FT
Pamietnik Muzyczny Warszawski (Warsaw, 1835–1836), FT
Ruch Muzyczny (Warsaw, 1857–1862), FT
+Pamietnik Muzyczny i Teatralny (1862), FT
Gazeta Muzyczna i Teatralna (Warsaw, 1865–1866), FT
Echo Muzyczne (Warsaw, 1879–1882), FT
Echo muzyczne, teatralne i artystyczne (Warsaw, 1883–1907), FT
Kwartalnik muzyczny (Warsaw, 1928–1933)

== Portuguese ==
Chronica dos Theatros (Lisbon, 1861–1871), FT
A Arte Musical (Lisbon, 1873–1875; 1890–1891), FT
Gazeta dos Theatros (Lisbon, 1875–1876), FT
Amphion (Lisbon, 1884–1887, 1890–1898)
A Arte musical (Lisbon, 1899–1915)
Boletín Latino-Americano de Música (Montevideo, Lima, Bogota, Rio de Janeiro, 1935–1938, 1941, 1946)

== Romanian ==
Tribuna muzicală (Bucharest, 1909), FT
Arta muzicală (Bucharest, 1911–1912), FT

== Russian ==
Muzyka i teatr [Музыка и Театръ. Газета Спецiадьно-Критическая] (St. Petersburg, 1867–1868), FT
Muzykal’ny listok [Музбікальій Листок] (St. Petersburg, 1872–1877), FT
Nuvellist: Muzïkal’no-teatral’naya gazeta [Нувеллист: Музьікально-Театральная Газета] (St. Petersburg, 1878–1905), FT
Russkiy muzïkal'nïy vestnik = Русскій музыкальный вѣстникъ (St. Petersburg, 1880–1882), FT
+Russkiy muzïkal'nïy i teatralʹnyĭ vestnik = Русскій музыкальный и театральный вѣстникъ (1882)
Muzïkal’noye obozrenie: Muzïkal’naya gazeta [Музьікальное Обозрение] (St. Petersburg, 1885–1888), FT
Bayan [Баянъ] (St. Petersburg, 1888–1890), FT
Russkaia muzykal'naia gazeta [Русская музыкальная газета] (St. Petersburg, 1894–1918), FT
Khronika zhurnala "Muzykal'nyi sovremennik" [Хроника журнала «Музыкальный современник»] (St. Petersburg, 1915–1917), FT
Orfei: knigi o muzyke [Орфей: Книги о музыке] (St. Petersburg, 1922), FT
Muzikal'naya letopis' = Музыкальная Летопись (Petrograd, Leningrad, 1922–1923, 1926)
K novym beregam = К новым берегам (Moscow, 1923)
Muzïkalʹnaya nov = Музыкальная новь (Moscow, 1923–1924), FT
Muzïkal'naya kul'tura [Музыкальная культура] (Moscow, 1924), FT
Sovremennaya muzyka [Современная музыка] (Moscow, 1924–1929), FT

== Serbian ==
Gudalo [Гудало] (Kikinda, 1886–1887), FT
Zvuk (Belgrade, 1932–1935), FT

== Spanish (Argentina) ==
Boletín Musical (Buenos Aires, 1837)
La Revista de Música (Buenos Aires, 1927–1929)

== Spanish (Chile) ==
Semanario Musical (Santiago, 1852), FT
Música (Santiago, 1920–1924), FT
Aulos (Santiago, 1932–1933)

== Spanish (Costa Rica) ==
Revista Musical (San José, 1940–1944), FT

== Spanish (Cuba) ==
La Música (Havana, 1948–1951)
Revista de Música (Havana, 1960–1961)

== Spanish (Spain) ==
La Iberia Musical (Madrid, 1842), FT
El Orfeo Andaluz (Seville, 1842–1843, 1847–1848), FT
El Anfión Matritense (Madrid, 1843), FT
Gaceta musical de Madrid (Madrid, 1855–1856), FT
La Zarzuela (Madrid, 1856–1857), FT
La España Artística (Madrid, 1857–1858), FT
La Gaceta Musical Barcelonesa (Barcelona, 1861–1865), FT
El Orfeón Español (Barcelona, 1862–1864), FT
La Escena (Madrid, 1865–1867), FT
Revista y Gaceta Musical (Madrid, 1867–1868), FT
La Opera Española (Madrid, 1875–1876), FT
Chorizos y polacos: Revista festiva teatral (Madrid, 1882–1883), FT
Enciclopedia Musical (Barcelona, 1884–1886), FT
Illustración Musical Hispano-Americana (Barcelona, 1888–1894), FT
El Eco Artístico: Revista Semanal de Espectáculos y Bellas Artes (Barcelona, 1897), FT
La Música Ilustrada Hispano-Americana (Barcelona, 1898–1902), FT
+La Música Ilustrada (1898–1900), FT
La Revista musical (Bilbao, 1909–1910), FT
Música: Album-Revista Musical (Madrid, 1917), FT
Musicografía: Publicación mensual del Instituto-Escuela de Música (Monòver, 1933–1936), FT

== Spanish (Guatemala) ==
La Revista Musical (Guatemala City, 1927–1929), FT

== Spanish (Mexico) ==
La Armonía (Mexico City, 1866–1867), FT
La Batuta (Mexico City, 1874)
Revista Musical de México (Mexico City, 1919–1920), FT
El Sonido 13 (Mexico City, 1924–1931)
+The 13th Sound (1927)
Gaceta Musical (Paris, 1928–1929), FT
Musica: Revista Mexicana (Mexico City, 1930–1931), FT
Cultura Musical (Mexico City, 1936–1937), FT
Nuestra Musica (Mexico City, 1946–1953)

== Spanish (Peru) ==
Antara (Lima, 1930)
Revista Musical Peruana (Lima, 1939–1941), FT
Boletín Latino-Americano de Música (Montevideo, Lima, Bogotá, Rio de Janeiro, 1935–1938, 1941, 1946), FT

== Spanish (United States) ==
Boletín de Musica y Artes Visuales (Washington, D.C., 1950–1956), FT

== Spanish (Uruguay) ==
Música viva (Montevideo, 1942), FT
Boletín Latino-Americano de Música (Montevideo, Lima, Bogota, Rio de Janeiro, 1935–1938, 1941, 1946), FT

== Spanish (Columbia) ==
Boletín Latino-Americano de Música (Montevideo, Lima, Bogotá, Rio de Janeiro, 1935–1938, 1941, 1946), FT

== Swedish ==
Stockholms musik-tidning (Stockholm, 1843–1844), FT
Ny tidning för musik (Stockholm, 1853–1857), FT
Svensk musiktidning (Stockholm, 1880–1913), FT
+Necken: svensk musiktidning (1880), FT
Ur Nutidens Musikliv (Stockholm, 1880–1913), FT
Finsk musikrevy (Helsinki, 1905–1906)
