= Hytteliv =

Norwegian lifestyle magazine

- Categories: Lifestyle magazine
- Frequency: Monthly
- Circulation: 32,503 (2022)
- Publisher: Egmont Hjemmet Mortensen A/S
- Founded: 1972; 54 years ago
- Country: Norway
- Based in: Oslo
- Language: Norwegian
- Website: https://www.klikk.no/bolig/hytteliv
- ISSN: 0332-6772
- OCLC: 924773080

Hytteliv is a Norwegian language monthly magazine published in Oslo, Norway. The magazine provides articles about life at the cabin. It has been in circulation since 1972.

== History and profile ==
Hytteliv was established in 1972. The magazine is published on a monthly basis in Oslo. The publisher is Egmont Hjemmet Mortensen A/S. The magazine features articles on do-it-yourself material, tips about new products and equipment, structural/building service, law and finance advice. The readers of the monthly are both women and men who own cabins.

The circulation of Hytteliv was 60,000 copies in 1999 and 55,000 copies in 2000. In 2007 its circulation was 61,043 copies. The monthly sold 48,137 copies in 2011. In 2020 its circulation was 34,971 copies. Its 2022 circulation was 32,503 copies.

== See also ==
- List of magazines in Norway
