= Norsk Golf =

Norwegian golf magazine

- Categories: Golf magazine
- Frequency: Bimonthly
- Circulation: 18,000 (2024)
- Publisher: Se og Hør Forlaget
- Founded: 1956
- Company: Aller Media
- Country: Norway
- Based in: Oslo
- Language: Norwegian
- Website: http://www.norskgolf.no/

Norsk Golf is a Norwegian golf magazine, which is sent to registered golf players in Norway. The magazine is based in Oslo.

== History ==
Norsk Golf was founded in 1956. It is headquartered in Oslo. The magazine is part of Aller Media and is published six times a year by Se og Hør Forlaget (Norsk Aller AS). The publication is also supported by the Norwegian Golf Federation. It was formerly published eight times per year.

== Circulation ==
In 2006 the circulation of Norsk Golf was 75,000 copies. It sold 75,626 copies in 2007, making it the ninth top title in the country. The magazine was distributed 75,501 copies to the members of the Norwegian Golf Federation in 2011.
