= Nordisk musik-tidende =

Monthly music magazine in Norway (1880–1892)

- Categories: Music magazine
- Frequency: Monthly
- Founder: Carl Warmuth
- Founded: 1880
- First issue: January 1880
- Final issue: January 1892
- Country: Norway
- Based in: Oslo
- Language: Norwegian

Nordisk musik-tidende was a monthly music magazine which was published in Oslo, Norway, between 1880 and 1892. It is the first music periodical published in the country. Its subtitle was Månedsskrift for musikere og musikvenner (Norwegian: Monthly magazine for musicians and music lovers).

== History and profile ==
Nordisk musik-tidende was established by Norwegian music publisher Carl Warmuth in 1880. Its first issue appeared in January that year. It came out monthly and was headquartered in Oslo. The magazine had correspondents in Denmark, Sweden and Finland. It also had connections with other reporters in the leading European music centers. The magazine featured articles by Scandinavian music critics and historians. They included Bredo Lassen, Angul Hammerich, Johan Svendsen, Alexander Bull and Adolf Lindgren. Nordisk musik-tidende also contained sections on biographical sketches of Scandinavian music figures, lists of deceased Norwegian musicians and of Norwegian music performed outside Norway, and the addresses of Norwegian musicians living abroad.

Nordisk musik-tidende ceased publication in January 1892. It is one of the publications archived by the Répertoire international de la presse musicale, known as RIPM.
