= Vi Menn =

Weekly men's magazine in Oslo, Norway

Vi Menn, (English: Us Men) is Europe and Norway's largest weekly lifestyle magazine for men. Founded in 1951 the magazine is one of the earliest publications targeting men. It is based in Oslo, Norway.

== History and profile ==
Vi Menn was established in 1951. The magazine covers articles on a wide range of topics, including: adventure, war stories, travel, hunting, sports and cars. It is owned by the Egmont Group. The magazine is published weekly by Egmont Publishing. Its editor-in-chief is Alexander Øystå. The headquarters of Vi Menn is in Oslo.

In 1999 Vi Menn was the best-selling men's magazine in Norway with a circulation of 108,000 copies. The magazine sold 96,827 copies in 2007.

== See also ==
- List of Norwegian magazines
