= Z Filmtidsskrift =

Film magazine in Norway

Z Filmtidsskrift is a Norwegian film magazine, which was started in 1983. The magazine is owned and published by the Norwegian Federation of Film Societies. It is published on a quarterly basis and is based in Oslo. As of 2014 Ingrid Rommetveit was the editor of the magazine. Each issue of Z Filmtidsskrift features articles on a specific theme, interviews and in-depth analysis of movies.

== See also ==
- List of film periodicals
