= Ute og hjemme =

Norwegian women's magazine

Cover of Ute og hjemme

Ute og hjemme was a Norwegian weekly magazine, released by Allers Familie-Journal in January 2008. The magazine was based in Oslo. Its target group was "women and their families 35 years and older". The editor was Lars Gulbrandsen. It soon faced competition from the very similar magazine Ute & Inne, and was discontinued after slightly more than a year.
