= Familien =

Norwegian biweekly family magazine

- Categories: Family magazine
- Frequency: Biweekly
- Circulation: 50,000 (2024)
- Publisher: Hjemmet Mortensen AB
- Founded: 1939
- Company: Egmont Group
- Country: Norway
- Based in: Oslo
- Language: Norwegian
- Website: Familien

Familien (English: The Family) is a Norwegian biweekly family magazine published in Oslo, Norway.

== History and profile ==
The magazine was started in 1939 under the name Christian Youth. It was renamed Familien in 1959. It was part of A/S Hjemmet until 1984 when it was acquired by Hjemmet Mortensen AS, which owned it until 1992.

Familien is owned by the Egmont Group. The magazine is published by Hjemmet Mortensen AB on a biweekly basis. Its target group is mature women, and its editor is Ivar Moe. The magazine is based in Oslo.

Familien had a circulation of 95,100 copies in 1981 and 101,900 copies in 1982. The circulation of the magazine was 132,900 copies in 2006, making it the fourth best-selling magazine in the country. In 2013 it was the third best-selling magazine in Norway with a circulation of 97,324 copies. The magazine sold 57,205 copies in 2022.

== See also ==
- List of magazines in Norway
