= Fredrikstad bys historie =

Norwegian history book series

Fredrikstad bys historie is a six-volume book series on the history of the Norwegian town Fredrikstad. The first five volumes were written by Martin Dehli, whilst the sixth was written by Ivo de Figueiredo.
