= Krydder =

Men's magazine in Norway (1946–1970)

Krydder (Norwegian: "Spice") was a men's magazine which was published in Norway.

The magazine was issued by the publisher L. K. Breiens Forlag from 1946 to 1970. The content was jokes and humorous stories combined with soft-core images of naked women.
