= Hjemmet =

Family magazine in Norway

- Editor: Lise Hansen
- Categories: Family magazine
- Frequency: Weekly
- Circulation: 105,000 (2024)
- Publisher: Hjemmet Mortensen AB
- Founded: 1909; 117 years ago
- Company: Egmont Group
- Country: Norway
- Based in: Oslo
- Language: Norwegian
- Website: Hjemmet Denmark; Hjemmet Norway

Hjemmet, pronounced "yemmeh" (English: Home) is a Norwegian weekly family magazine published in Oslo, Norway. It has been in circulation since 1909.

== History and profile ==
Hjemmet was launched by the Hjemmet Mortensen AB in 1909, which merged with Ernst G. Mortensen, Egmont Group, in 1992. After the merge it became owned by the Egmont Group which also owns Hjemmet (Norway) and Hemmets Journal (Sweden). The publisher is the Hjemmet Mortensen AB. The editor is Lise Hansen. The magazine is headquartered in Oslo.

The magazine contains features, articles on food and interior decoration and crosswords. It is described as a family weekly and targets family-oriented women in their 40s or older. However, 27% of its readers were men in 2013.

== Circulation ==
Hjemmet sold 238,857 copies in 2002. In 2003 its circulation was 237,000 copies, making it the best-selling general interest magazine in Norway. The circulation of the magazine was 182,555 copies in 2010. For the first six months of 2013 its circulation was 169,258 copies. Hjemmet was the best-selling magazine in Norway with a circulation of 161,585 copies in 2013. The Danish version of the magazine which is also published weekly had a circulation of 197,000 in 2003 and 108,000 copies in 2013. Its circulation was 112,215 copies in 2022.

== See also ==
- List of Norwegian magazines
