= Knut Haavik =

Norwegian journalist, writer, and editor (1943–2019)

Knut Haavik (4 December 1943 – 8 February 2019) was a Norwegian journalist, writer, and editor. He was the founder of the Norwegian weekly Se og Hør, and was the magazine's first editor-in-chief in the 1980s and 1990s.
