= Arild Aspøy =

Norwegian journalist and author

Arild Aspøy (born 1958) is a Norwegian journalist, writer, director and editor. Aspøy has primarily been active as an investigative journalist and author.

Aspøy's articles on the black market in heavy water led Norway to stop the export of this material, which has contributed to the development of nuclear weapons in several countries. In a series of articles in VG, he showed that heavy water produced by Norsk Hydro had ended up in Indian nuclear reactors used for the production of nuclear weapons. In 1983, heavy water was smuggled from Oslo to India using a German courier. The revelation led to an international investigation by the Norwegian Police Security Service. Together with the disclosure by the Norwegian Broadcasting Corporation (NRK) that the same German black market operator had smuggled heavy water from Norway to the Ceausescu regime in Romania, Aspøy's exposé was a main reason that the export of heavy water from Norway was stopped.

Aspøy developed this case further in his book Familiejuveler: Tungtvann, våpen og CIA (Family Jewels: Heavy water, weapons and the CIA; Cappelen, 1990). Here he shows how the smuggling of heavy water from Norway was carried out by an illegal global network that performed extensive smuggling of nuclear materials and weapons, sometimes in cooperation with intelligence agencies and authorities.

From 1993 to 2007, Aspøy was a director and journalist in the documentary division of NRK television. In 2011 he published the novel Fredsfyrster (Princes of Peace; Aschehoug), a thriller about an attempt to secure the Nobel Peace Prize. The reviewer for the daily Verdens Gang (VG) referred to it as "One of this somewhat special fall's most interesting and successful Norwegian thrillers" and rated it 5 out of 6.

He holds a degree in Cand.polit. (Master's) in comparative politics from the University of Bergen.

== Selected television productions ==
- Våpenhandlerne (The Weapons dealers): The relationship between defence chiefs and other officers and the defence industry (Brennpunkt, NRK, 1994)
- Penger, politikk og påvirkning (Money, politics and influence): The shipowners' lobby's campaign for new tax legislation (Brennpunkt, NRK, 1996)
- Vokt dem for hunden (Beware of Dog): Neighbors' resistance to an acute care institution for drug abusers in an affluent neighborhood on the west side of Oslo (Montebello) (Brennpunkt, NRK, 1997)
- Bombekremmerne (The Bomb merchants): Norway sold plutonium plant to Israel (Brennpunkt, NRK, 1998)
- Vi som støtter Amerika (We who support America): Three Norwegian sailors hired by the CIA during the prelude to the Vietnam War (Brennpunkt, NRK, 2000)

== Selected books ==
- Fredsfyrster (Princes of Peace). Novel. Aschehoug, 2011
- Familiejuveler: Tungtvann, våpen og CIA (Family Jewels: Heavy water, weapons and the CIA). Cappelen, 1990
- Kjæresten fridde på dopapir (The Boyfriend Proposed on Toilet Paper). Se og Hør and the battle for privacy. Aschehoug, 1995
- Virkelighetskonkurransen (The Reality Competition). Scandals, techniques and dilemmas of modern television production. Høyskoleforlaget, 2000
