= Se og Hør =

Scandinavian magazine

Se og Hør Se & Hör (Sweden)
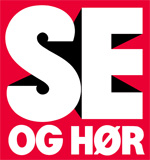
- Logo of the Danish and Norwegian versions
- Editor: Kim Henningsen (Denmark); Ulf André Andersen (Norway); Carina Löfkvist (Sweden)
- Categories: Celebrity journalism
- Founded: 1939
- Company: Aller Media
- Country: Denmark; Norway; Sweden
- Language: Danish; Norwegian; Swedish
- Website: www.seoghoer.dk (Denmark) www.seher.no (Norway) www.soh.se (Sweden)

Se og Hør (Danish: [ˈseˀ ʌ ˈhɶɐ̯], Norwegian: [ˈseː ɔ ˈhøːr]) / Se & Hör (Swedish: [ˈseː ɔ ˈhœːr]; "See and Hear") is a TV guide and celebrity journalism magazine published in three independent versions in Denmark, Norway and Sweden by the Danish company Aller Media. The Danish version is the oldest. The Danish and Swedish editions are published weekly; the Norwegian, the largest of the three, twice a week. It is the largest circulation illustrated weekly in all three countries; the Norwegian version has sometimes had the largest weekly circulation in Scandinavia.

== Editions ==
=== Denmark ===
Se og Hør first appeared in Denmark in 1939 as Det Ny Radioblad (The New Radio Magazine). In 1953 it began to cover the then new medium of television and changed its name to Se og Hør, retaining the old name as a subtitle.

Se og Hør is the largest illustrated weekly in Denmark, with average weekly sales of 133,325 in the first half of 2012. In the 1980s and early 1990s, under former editor-in-chief Mogens E. Pedersen, it sold as many as 350,000 copies a week. Since November 2006, the magazine has awarded a journalism prize worth 150,000 kroner.

In June 2009, Kim Henningsen became editor-in-chief at the Danish Se og Hør, succeeding Henrik Qvortrup, who had left in November 2008 to become political editor at TV2.

In April 2014, Se og Hør was involved in a media scandal when they were accused of using illegally leaked information about celebrities' credit card transactions and flight seat numbers.

=== Norway ===
The Norwegian Se og Hør began publication in 1978 and the first issue appeared on 21 September 1978 as an offshoot of the Allers publication Allers Familie-Journal, based on the Danish magazine. The headquarters of the magazine is in Oslo. The publisher of the magazine is Se og Hør Forlaget. Knut Haavik, the first editor-in-chief, remained in the position for 25 years until his retirement in 2004, when he was succeeded by Odd Johan Nelvik, who had assisted him since the beginning. In autumn 2008, Harald Haave was named editor-in-chief after a period as assistant editor-in-chief. Nelvik retained a consultant position at the magazine. In autumn 2012, Haave was replaced by Ellen Arnstad as the magazine's first female editor-in-chief. From 2017 Ulf André Andersen was chief editor of Se og Hør.

Since September 2003, the Norwegian Se og Hør has been published twice a week, on Tuesdays and Fridays. On 19 May 2006, the magazine launched an online version, seoghør.no, which is now the celebrity website seher.no, run by Aller Internet. As of October 2012, the site had approximately 450,000 unique users per week. As of January 2013, it ranked 74th in Norway at the Alexa Internet statistics service. David Stenerud served as its editor until May 2012, when he left and was not replaced as part of a policy of closer coordination between the website and the print magazine. In summer 2012, the magazine became available for the iPad from the Apple App Store; this mobile service had 70,000 subscribers in 2012.

In the 1990s, the Norwegian Se og Hør had the largest circulation of any Scandinavian weekly. It was the best-selling television magazine in 2003 in Norway with a circulation of 268,000 copies. In 2004, circulation fell 4.8% while the position of a competitor, Her og Nå, became stronger. The circulation of the magazine was 145,900 copies in 2006. For 2011, the figures were 178,000 for the Tuesday edition and 109,000 for the weekend edition. As of February 2012, in a shrinking market, it was narrowly maintaining its position as Scandinavia's biggest weekly.

The Norwegian Se og Hør has been the subject of three books by journalists. Arild Aspøy's Kjæresten fridde på dopapir: Se og Hør og kampen om privatlivet (1995; ISBN 9788203261091) explores issues of privacy raised by the magazine's editorial practices. Håvard Melnæs' En helt vanlig dag på jobben: Se og hør fra innsiden (2007; ISBN 9788248905431) recounts his experiences working there as a reporter and was the basis of the 2010 film En helt vanlig dag på jobben. Arne O. Holm's Ja, vi elsker Se og Hør: hemmelighetene bak verdens største ukebladsuksess (2007; ISBN 9788248907374) analyses the balance of celebrity stories and gossip about relatively ordinary people and the influence of the magazine's coverage.

=== Sweden ===
The Swedish Se & Hör was formed in 1994 by a merger of Hänt i Veckan (founded in 1964) and Röster i radio-TV (founded in 1932 and owned by Sveriges Radio). Its editor-in-chief was Carina Löfkvist, who succeeded Tua Lundström after the latter's death in 2009. However, in 2014, Se & Hör was merged with Hänt Extra, and the resulting new magazine took back the old name Hänt i Veckan.

== Sister magazines ==
In Finland Aller Media publishes an entertainment and TV magazine Seiska which, according to Helsingin Sanomat, is Se og Hør's sister magazine.

== Controversies ==
=== Iceland ===
In 1997, Se og Hør sued the similarly named but unrelated Icelandic celebrity magazine Séð og heyrt (Seen and Heard) for imitation and copyright infringement and for imitating their layout and content, but the case was dismissed five years later.

=== Norway ===
In 2020, the Norwegian Se og Hør was accused by several prominent Norwegian celebrities to have invaded their privacy and posted a variety of photos and videos without prior consent, among other issues.

In August 2023, Skal vi danse professional dancer Helene Spilling expressed her frustration at Se og Hør for having followed after and published paparazzi photos of her and Martin Ødegaard earlier that year, saying that it was "not fun and really disrespectful". She said that it is "disrespectful to send a car after others for several hours", and was particularly annoyed at the fact that Ødegaard's licence plate was pictured in some of the photos.

In November 2023, Se og Hør published an article and identified the name of Alexandra Joner's new partner and released photos of him. Joner talked about her wanting for the article to be removed, but the magazine refused to do so. It was also described by Joner's manager as "disrespectful".

On 1 June 2026, the magazine's website published an AI-generated photo of Marius Borg Høiby at the Oslo Prison, together with other detainees, at an inflatable pool. The magazine had never before used an AI tool, which they used to improve an existing photo. Among the hallucinations were Høiby having six fingers and his tattoos moving places; this caused its website to remove the affected item minutes after posting. On 13 June 2026, it was announced that it would never use AI tools again, limiting to existing software such as Photoshop.

== See also ==
- List of Norwegian magazines
