= Her og Nå =

Norwegian weekly magazine

- Categories: Entertainment
- Frequency: Weekly
- Circulation: 35,000 (2024)
- Publisher: Hjemmet Mortensen
- First issue: 2001
- Country: Norway
- Based in: Oslo

Her og Nå (English: Here and Now) is a Norwegian weekly magazine that was released in 2001. The magazine is based in Oslo. It is the main competitor to the market leader Se og Hør. The readers are relatively well distributed between sex and age groups. It contains news about celebrities and royals, as well as a TV-guide.

Her og Nå is part of Egmont/Orkla AS and is published by Hjemmet Mortensen on a weekly basis. The editor is Rino Rådahl.

The circulation of Her og Nå was 193,000 in 2003. The magazine had a circulation of 176,600 copies in 2006 and 177,422 copies in 2007.
