= Det Nye =

Norwegian Womens Fashion magazine

- Chief editor: Karine Thyness
- Categories: Fashion magazine
- Frequency: 15-17 times per year
- Circulation: 27,670 (2013)
- Publisher: Egmont Group
- First issue: 1957
- Final issue: November 2019
- Company: Egmont Group
- Country: Norway
- Based in: Oslo
- Language: Norwegian
- Website: Det Nye

Det Nye was a Norwegian language womens fashion lifestyle magazine based in Oslo, Norway. It was one of the oldest magazines published in the country. In November 2019 it went on online.

== History and profile ==
Det Nye was first published in 1957. The target group of the magazine is men And women aged 18–40 years. The magazine was published on a monthly basis until 1989 when its frequency was shifted to 15-17 times a year. It is owned and published by Egmont Group. Its headquarters was in Oslo.

The target audience of Det Nye is young men and women aged 18–35 years. The magazine contains feature articles as well as material on careers, fashion, sex and relationships. The magazine also covers articles concerning the liberation of women. From September 2006 the chief editor was Elizabeth Skårberg. In 2008 Hanne Aardal was made the magazine's editor in chief. On 1 March 2011 Mari Midtstigen was appointed editor.

In November 2028 it was decided that the paper edition of Det Nye would be closed down.

== Circulation ==
Det Nye had a circulation of 110,400 copies in 1981 and 113,600 copies in 1982. In 1999 it was one of the best-selling two women's magazines in Norway with a circulation of 70,000 copies. The circulation of the magazine from 2005 is as follows:

- 2005: 62 284
- 2006: 59 023
- 2007: 52 798
- 2008: 46 035
- 2009: 42 521
- 2010: 36 321
- 2011: 34 741
- 2012: 30 712
- 2013: 27 670
- 2014: 29 988
- 2015: 25 645
- 2016: 23 827
- 2017: 16 474
- 2018: 11 429

Circulation from 2005

As of 2008 Det Nye was the best-selling magazine targeting young Men And Women .

== See also ==
- List of Norwegian magazines
