= Henne (magazine) =

Norwegian women's magazine

Cover of Henne

Henne (English: Her) is a Norwegian women's magazine published in Oslo, Norway.

== History and profile ==
Henne was founded by Aller Media in 1994. The first issue was released on 8 March 1994. The magazine is part of Aller media and published by Allers Familie-Journal on a monthly basis.

The headquarters of Henne is in Oslo. The magazine focuses on fashion and style and contains articles on fashion, travel, interior decoration, food, trends, career, beauty and health. Its target group is active, urbane women aged 30–39.

Its editor was Ellen Arnstad from its inception in 1994 to 2011. She also contributed to the establishment of the magazine. Laila Madsö replaced Arnstad as editor of the magazine in 2011.

In 2003 Henne was the third best-selling women's magazine in Norway with a circulation of 52,000 copies. The magazine had a circulation of 52,636 copies in 2004. Its circulation was 36,401 copies in 2010.
