= Norsk Ukeblad =

Weekly family magazine in Oslo, Norway

- Editor: Maj-Lis Stordal
- Categories: Family magazine
- Frequency: Weekly
- Circulation: 32,000 (2024)
- Publisher: Hjemmet Mortensen AB
- Founded: 1933; 93 years ago
- Company: Egmont Group
- Country: Norway
- Based in: Oslo
- Language: Norwegian
- Website: Norsk Ukeblad

Norsk Ukeblad (English: “Norwegian Weekly Magazine”) is a Norwegian language weekly family magazine published in Oslo, Norway. It has been in circulation in 1933.

== History and profile ==
Norsk Ukeblad was established in 1933. It is owned by the Egmont Group and published weekly by the Hjemmet Mortensen AB. The magazine has its headquarters in Oslo. The editor is Maj-Lis Stordal.

Its target group is women 25 years and older. The magazine contains features as well as articles on food, interior decoration, health, fashion, and beauty.

== Circulation ==
The circulation of Norsk Ukeblad was 154,000 copies in 2003, making it the second best-selling general interest magazine in Norway. The magazine had a circulation of 126,400 copies in 2006 and 126,591 copies in 2007. In 2013 Norsk Ukeblad was the fifth best-selling magazine in Norway with a circulation of 77,191 copies. The magazine sold 39,796 copies in 2022.

== See also ==
- List of Norwegian magazines
