= Lifestyle journalism =

Field of journalism

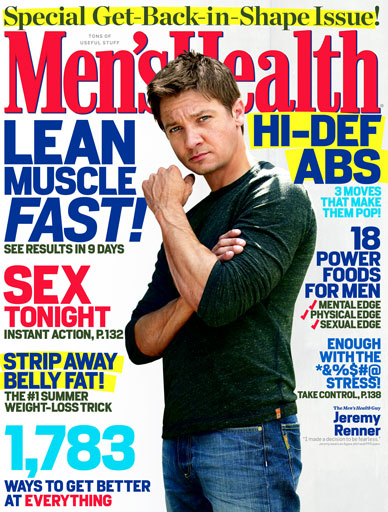
2010 September cover for Men's Health

Lifestyle journalism is the field of journalism that provides news and opinion, often in an entertaining tone, regarding goods and services used by readers in their everyday life. Lifestyle journalism covers travel, fashion, fitness, leisure, food, and arts, among other topics.

== See also ==
- Category:Lifestyle magazines
  - List of women's magazines
  - List of men's magazines
