= 1980 in Norway =

- Centuries: 18th; 19th; 20th; 21st
- Decades: 1960s; 1970s; 1980s; 1990s; 2000s
- See also: List of years in Norway

Events in the year 1980 in Norway.

== Incumbents ==
- Monarch – Olav V.
- Prime Minister – Odvar Nordli (Labour Party)

== Events ==
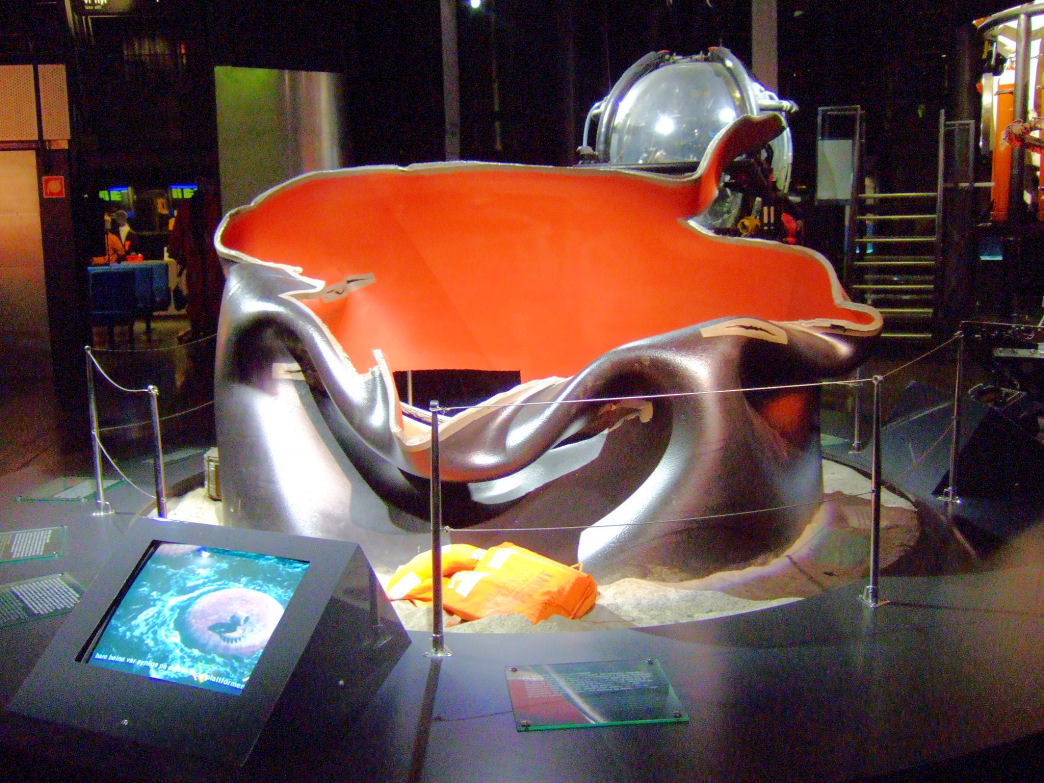
Part of the bracing that failed during the accident. On display in the Norwegian Petroleum Museum.

- Ongoing – The Alta controversy, a series of massive protests in the late 1970s and early 1980s concerning the construction of a hydroelectric power plant on the Altaelva river in Alta Municipality.
- 27 March – The Norwegian oil platform Alexander L. Kielland collapses in the North Sea, killing 123 of its crew of 212.
- 1 June – The Oslo Tunnel opened
- 1 November – Population Census: 4,091,132 inhabitants in Norway.
- Røros is designated by UNESCO as a World Heritage Site.

== Popular culture ==
=== Music ===
- 19 April – Norway was represented by Sverre Kjelsberg and Mattis Hætta, with the song '"Sámiid Ædnan", at the 1980 Eurovision Song Contest.
- The pop duo Dollie de Luxe established, consisting of Benedicte Adrian and Ingrid Bjørnov
- The band Vazelina Bilopphøggers was established in Gjøvik

=== Literature ===
- Humlehjertene, novel by Ola Bauer

== Notable births ==
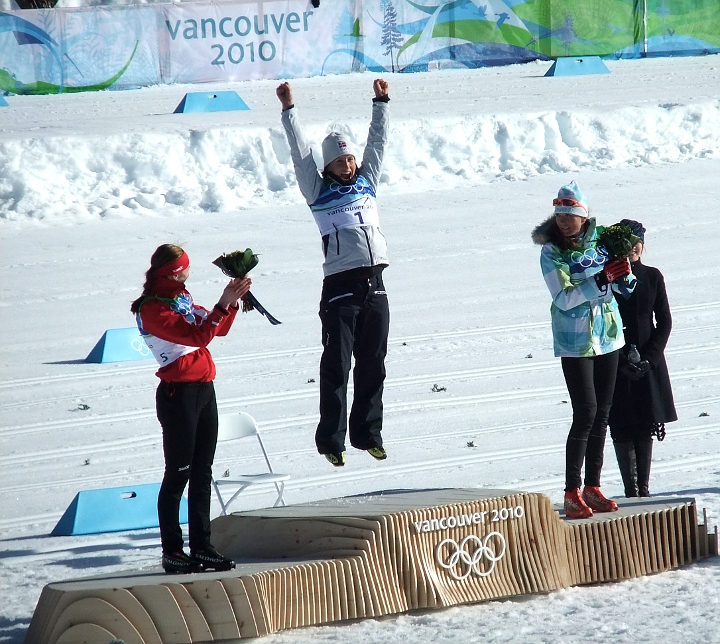
Marit Bjørgen celebrates sprint gold at the 2010 Winter Olympics.

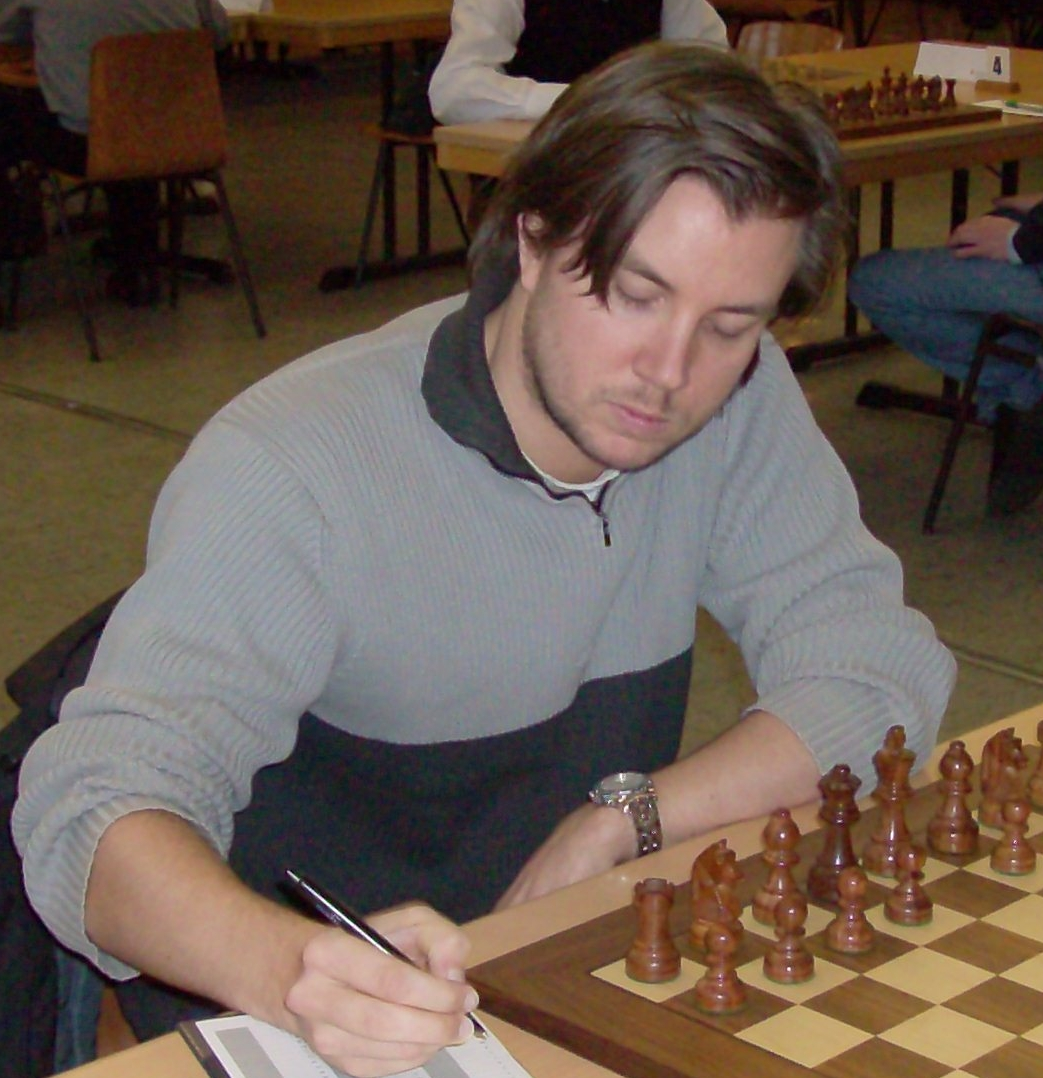
Leif Erlend Johannessen, chess grandmaster

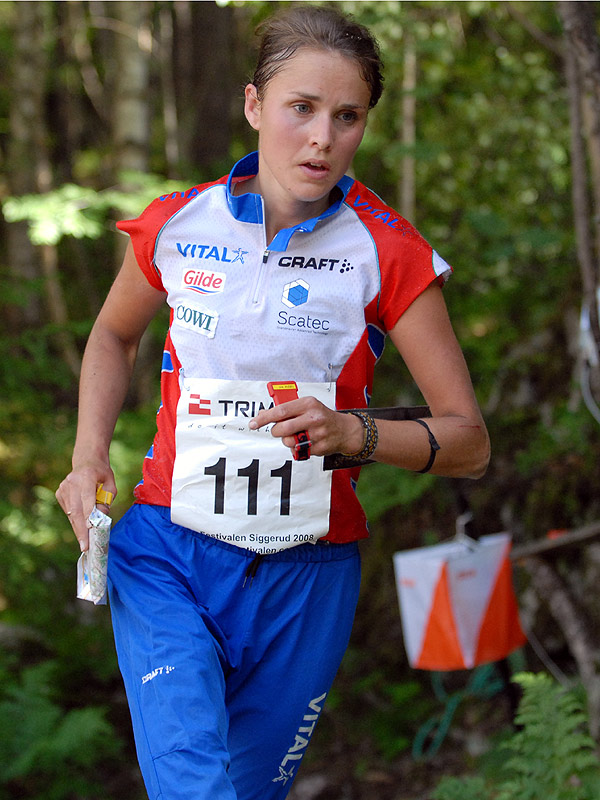
Marianne Riddervold in 2008

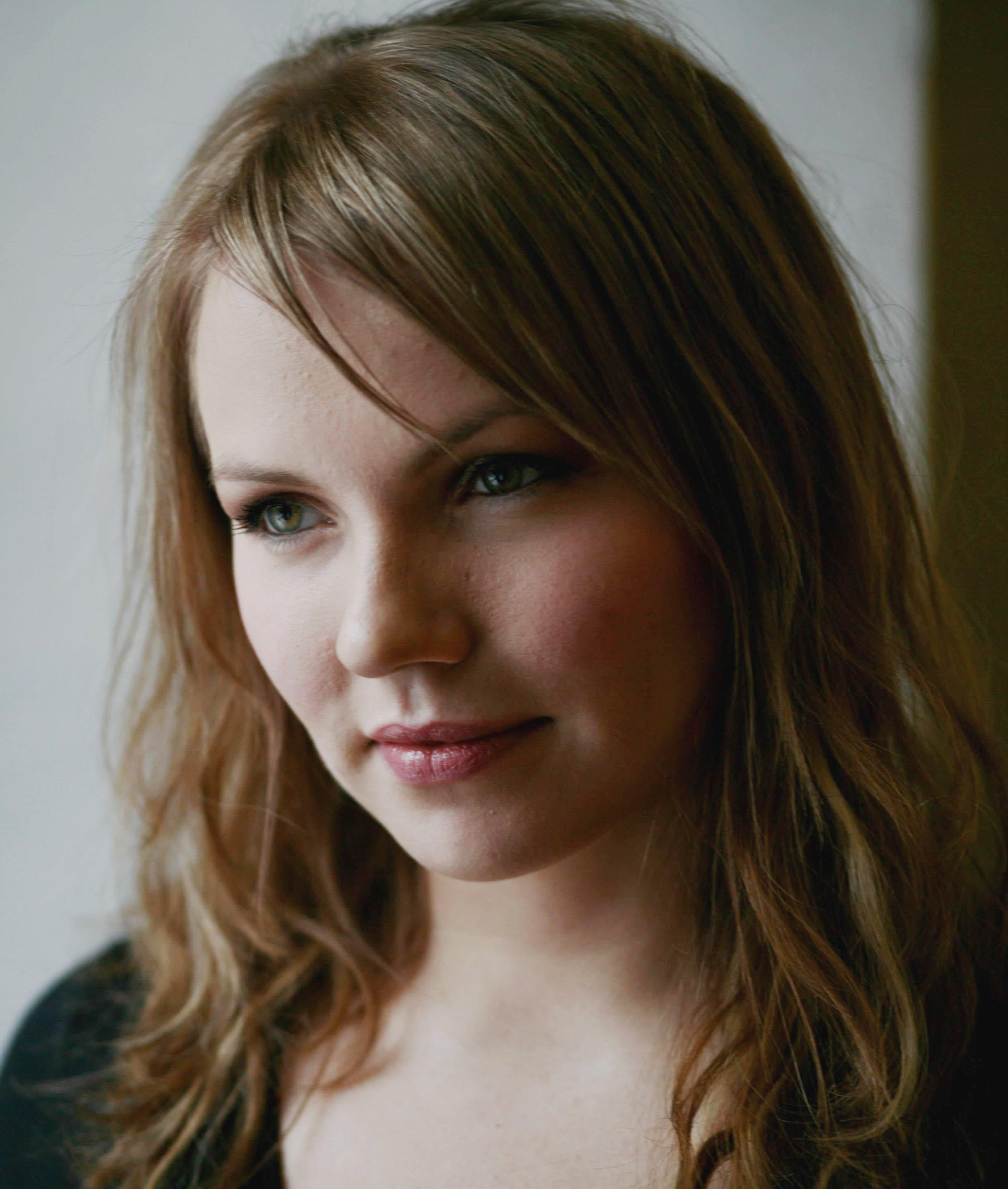
Lene Marlin in 2009

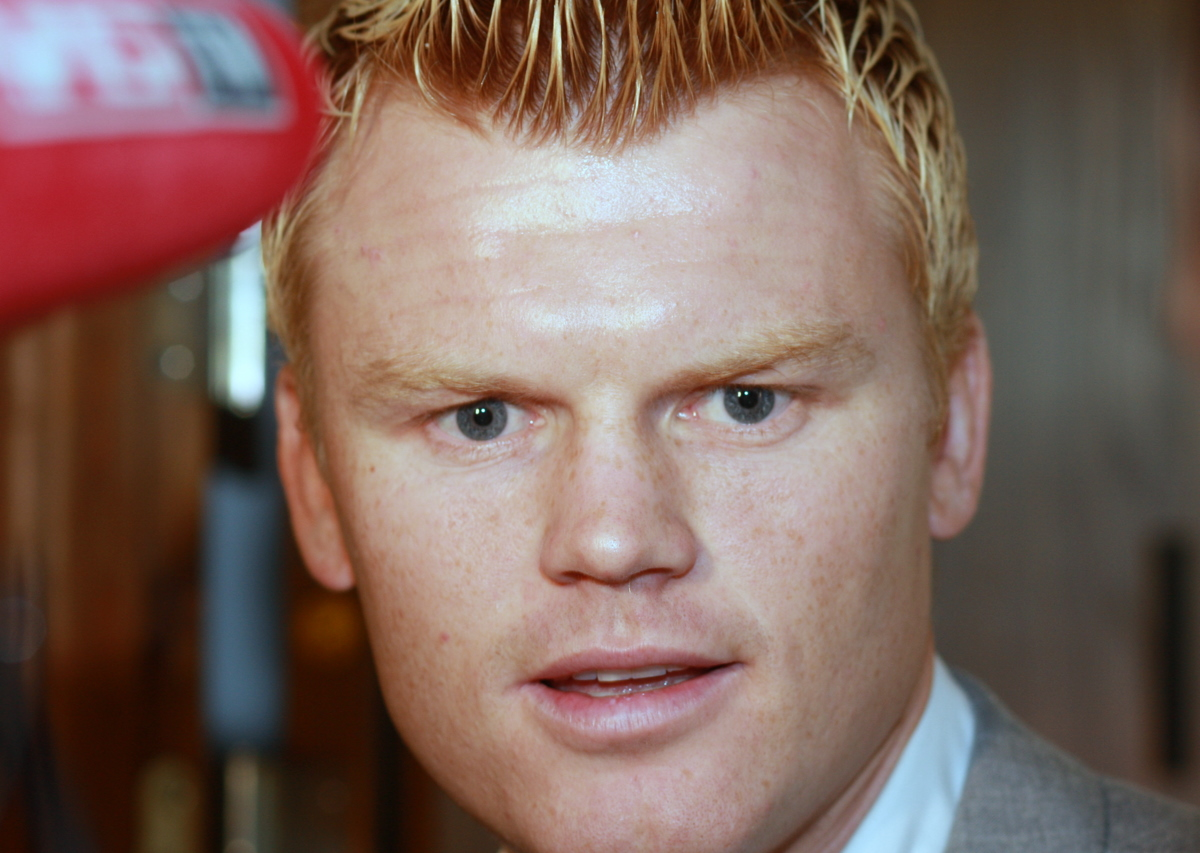
John Arne Riise has played more matches (110) than any other for the Norway national football team.

- 21 January – Alexander Os, biathlete
- 28 January – Hallgrim Hansegård, choreographer and dancer
- 29 January – Øyvind Svenning, footballer
- 6 February – Frank Løke, handball player
- 12 February – Tine Rustad Kristiansen, handball player
- 12 February – Maya Vik, singer, songwriter, and bass player
- 22 February – Maria-Karine Aasen-Svensrud, politician.
- 28 February – Sigurd Pettersen, ski jumper
- 29 February – John Anders Gaustad, cross-country skier
- 2 March – Ingrid Bolsø Berdal, actress, singer, and film producer
- 5 March – Marianne Riddervold, orienteering competitor
- 10 March – Lars Horntveth, musician
- 13 March – Kristian Solem, artistic gymnast
- 21 March – Marit Bjørgen, cross-country skier
- 24 March – Anette Hovind Johansen, handball player
- 25 March – Kathrine Sørland, model
- 30 March – Katrine Lunde, handball player.
- 30 March – Kristine Lunde-Borgersen, handball player.
- 1 April – Vebjørn Berg, sports shooter
- 2 April – Thor Erik Forsberg, politician
- 2 April – Lubna Jaffery, politician
- 5 April – Glenn Andersen, footballer
- 10 April – Odd Borgersen, speed skater
- 10 April – Reidar Borgersen, cyclist
- 10 April – Ingrid Hjelmseth, footballer
- 12 April – Espen Harald Bjerke, cross-country skier
- 20 April – Ole Magnus Ekelund, handball player
- 22 April – Kari-Anne Henriksen, handball player
- 5 May – Stian Omenås, jazz musician
- 10 May – Karoline Dyhre Breivang, handball player
- 10 May – Espen Bugge Pettersen, footballer
- 14 May – Morten Ask, ice hockey player
- 14 May – Leif Erlend Johannessen, chess player
- 14 May – Anders Tyvand, politician
- 20 May – Marianne Paulsen, footballer
- 20 May – Agnes Kittelsen, actress
- 2 June – Ane Stangeland Horpestad, footballer
- 5 June – Helge André Njåstad, politician
- 8 June – Margret Hagerup, politician
- 16 June – Tommy Urhaug, tennis player
- 16 June – Kadra Yusuf, Somali-Norwegian activist
- 17 June – Stian Aker, polar explorer
- 28 June – Rolf Jarle Brøske, politician
- 4 July – Rune Bolseth, footballer
- 11 July – Jenny Hval, singer, composer, lyricist and writer
- 24 July – Hans Åge Yndestad, footballer
- 30 July – Pa Modou Kah, footballer
- 5 August – Morten Solem, ski jumper
- 16 August – Øystein Moen, jazz pianist and composer
- 17 August – Lene Marlin, singer
- 19 August – Askil Holm, singer and musician
- 20 August – Per Steinar Osmundnes, politician
- 25 August – Pål Hausken, jazz musician
- 25 August – Marianne Marthinsen, politician
- 28 August – Tina Mari Flem, editor and media executive.
- 29 August – Tom Reidar Haraldsen, footballer
- 3 September – Jørgen Munkeby, jazz and heavy metal musician
- 8 September – Kristian Kjelling, handball player
- 9 September – Ragnhild Aamodt, handball player
- 10 September – Roy Steffensen, politician
- 14 September – Odd-Magnus Williamson, copywriter, comedian and actor
- 24 September – John Arne Riise, footballer
- 25 September – Christina Bjordal, jazz singer
- 3 October – Kjetil Mørland, Musical artist
- 13 October – Kristian Gislefoss, meteorologist and weather presenter
- 13 October – Magne Hoseth, footballer
- 14 October – Ingvild Ryggen Carstens, ski mountaineer and heptathlete
- 16 October – Ingrid Baltzersen, politician
- 16 October – Erik A. Schjerven, actor
- 17 October – Siri Wålberg, musical artist
- 28 October – Hans Bollandsås, blues musician
- 31 October – Anders Bastiansen, ice hockey player
- 6 November – Pål Sverre Valheim Hagen, actor
- 17 November – Geir Ludvig Fevang, footballer
- 21 November – Olav Magne Dønnem, ski jumper
- 22 November – Thomas Solvoll, footballer
- 11 November – Helene Rask, model
- 4 December – Dag Inge Ulstein, politician.
- 9 December – Anton Eger, jazz drummer
- 10 December – Jon Midttun Lie, footballer
- 11 December – Marit Fiane Grødum, footballer
- 16 December – Øyvind Heian, politician
- 28 December – Andreas Amundsen, jazz musician

== Notable deaths ==
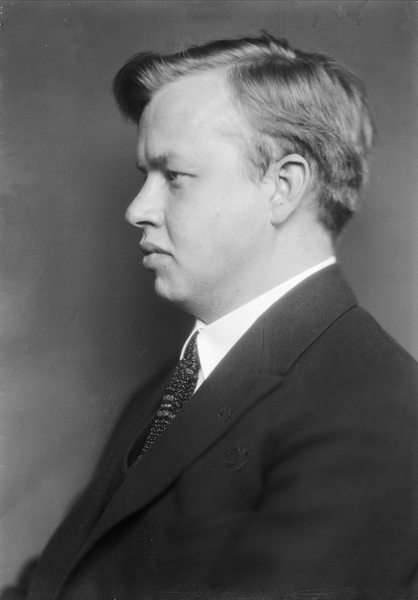
Dyre Vaa

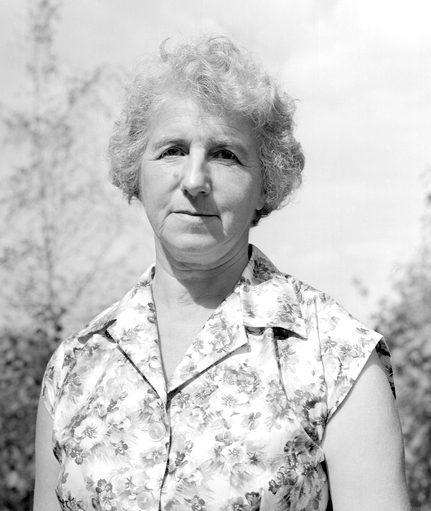
Ingrid Bjerkås

- 3 January – Harald Heide Steen, actor (b.1911)
- 5 January – Olav Berkaak, novelist (born 1915).
- 4 January – Axel Henry Hansen, gymnast (b.1887)
- 8 January – Tryggve Gran, aviator, explorer and author (b.1889)
- 1 February – Henry Reinholt, footballer (born 1890).
- 2 February – Sigurd Lersbryggen, politician (b.1901)
- 12 February – Jørgen Stubberud, polar explorer (b.1883)
- 16 February – Knut Olaf Andreasson Strand, politician (b.1887)
- 1 March – Arndt Jorgens, baseball player in America (b.1905)
- 17 March – Hans Nikolai Stavrand, politician (b.1894)
- 29 March – Einar Nilsen, boxer (b.1901)
- 9 April – Finn Halse, writer (born 1910).
- 11 April – Einar Østvedt, historian and educator (born 1903).
- 12 April – Sonja Wigert, actress (born 1913)
- 9 May – Rolf Hansen, long-distance runner (b.1906)
- 9 May Øivind Lorentzen, ship-owner (born 1881)
- 11 May – Dyre Vaa, sculptor and painter (born 1903).
- 16 May – Fredrik Lange-Nielsen, mathematician (born 1891).
- 17 May – Thore Michelsen, rower (b.1888)
- 27 May – Halfdan Olaus Christophersen, historian (born 1902).
- 1 June – Ingvald Svinsås-Lo, politician (b.1897)
- 9 July – Synnøve Lie, speed skater (b.1908)
- 14 July – Kristian Kristiansen, author (b.1909)
- 21 July – Dakky Kiær, politician and feminist (born 1892)
- 22 July – Gunvor Katharina Eker, politician (b.1906)
- 13 August – Kolbjørn Varmann, priest and politician (born 1904)
- 15 August – Hans Berg, politician (b.1902)
- 19 August – Hans Offerdal, politician (b.1909)
- 2 October – Anders Kristian Orvin, geologist and explorer (b. 1889)
- 5 October – Tor Oftedal, politician (b.1925)
- 19 October – Torger Hovi, politician (b.1905)
- 19 October – Wilhelm Bøe, organizational leader (born 1915).
- 9 November – Claudia Olsen, politician (b.1896)
- 13 November – Anna Skeide, poet (born 1910)
- 18 November – Knut Toven, politician (b.1897)
- 30 November – Ingrid Bjerkås, first female minister in the Church of Norway (b.1901)
- 8 December – Sverre Bergh, composer and pianist (born 1915).
- 25 December – Olav Dalgard, filmmaker and literature and art historian (b.1898)
- 25 December – Erik Harry Johannessen, painter (born 1902).

=== Full date unknown ===
- Sigval Bergesen the Younger, shipping magnate and industrialist (b.1893)
- Gunnar Bråthen, politician (b.1896)
- Hilmar Reksten, shipping magnate (b.1897)
- Øistein Strømnæs, intelligence officer (b.1914)
- Jens Tangen, trade unionist (born 1897)
- Kristian Vilhelm Koren Schjelderup, Jr., theologian, author and bishop (b.1894)
