= Sandem =

Sandem is a Norwegian surname. Notable people with the surname include:

- Thomas Sandem (born 1973), Norwegian footballer
- Vidar Sandem (born 1947), Norwegian actor, playwright and theatre director
