= Bjarki (disambiguation) =

Bjarki may refer to:

- Bödvar Bjarki, the hero appearing in tales of Hrólf Kraki in the Saga of Hrólf Kraki, in the Latin epitome to the lost Skjöldunga saga, and as Biarco in Saxo Grammaticus' Gesta Danorum.
- Viktor Bjarki Arnarsson, an Icelandic footballer.
- Bjarki Gunnlaugsson, an Icelandic professional footballer.
