= Idrettsgallaen =

Norwegian yearly sports gala

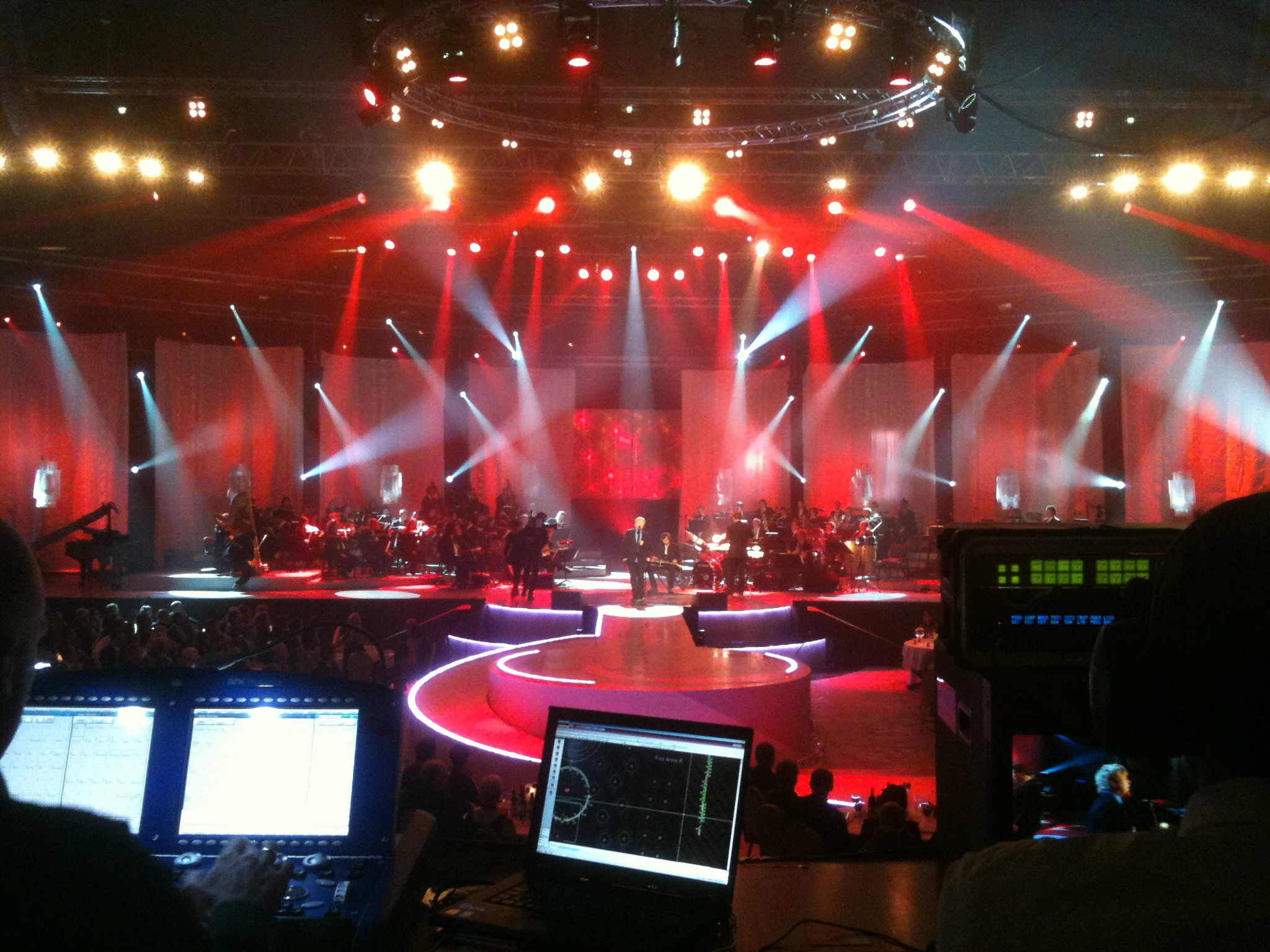
Kurt Nilsen performing during Idrettsgallaen 2010

Idrettsgallaen ("the Sports Gala") is a show to honor the past year's Norwegian sports and athletes' achievements. It is hosted annually at Hamar Olympic Amphitheatre in Hamar in early January. The event started in 2001. Hamar was selected because it is the location of the head office of Norsk Tipping, the main sponsor, and organizer of the event together with the Norwegian Broadcasting Corporation and the Norwegian Confederation of Sports. The 2010 edition was, however, hosted at Håkons Hall in Lillehammer. The 2024 edition took place at Trondheim Spektrum in Trondheim.

The 2021 edition was cancelled due to the COVID-19 pandemic

The event has several different awards including «årets navn (name of the year)» «årets trener (coach of the year)», «årets kvinnelige utøver (female athlete of the year)», «årets mannlige utøver (male athlete of the year)», «årets lagspiller (team player of the year)» and «årets gjennombrudd (breakthrough of the year)».

== Name of the year ==
- 2001: Bente Skari and Ole Einar Bjørndalen
- 2002: Ole Einar Bjørndalen
- 2003: Petter Solberg
- 2004: Gunn-Rita Dahle
- 2006: Marit Bjørgen
- 2007: Kjetil André Aamodt
- 2008: Odd-Bjørn Hjelmeset
- 2009: Norway women's national handball team
- 2010: Petter Northug
- 2011: Thor Hushovd
- 2012: Therese Johaug
- 2013: Cecilia Brækhus
- 2014: Magnus Carlsen
- 2015: Alexander Kristoff
- 2016: Petter Northug
- 2017: Stig-André Berge
- 2018: Karsten Warholm
- 2019: Marit Bjørgen
- 2020: Karsten Warholm
- 2021: No award
- 2022: Maren Lundby
- 2023: Erling Braut Haaland
- 2024: Maren Lundby
- 2025: Markus Rooth
- 2026: Katrine Lunde
