= Kristiansand Cathedral School =

Public high school in Kristiansand, Norway

Coordinates: 58°09′36″N 8°00′37″E

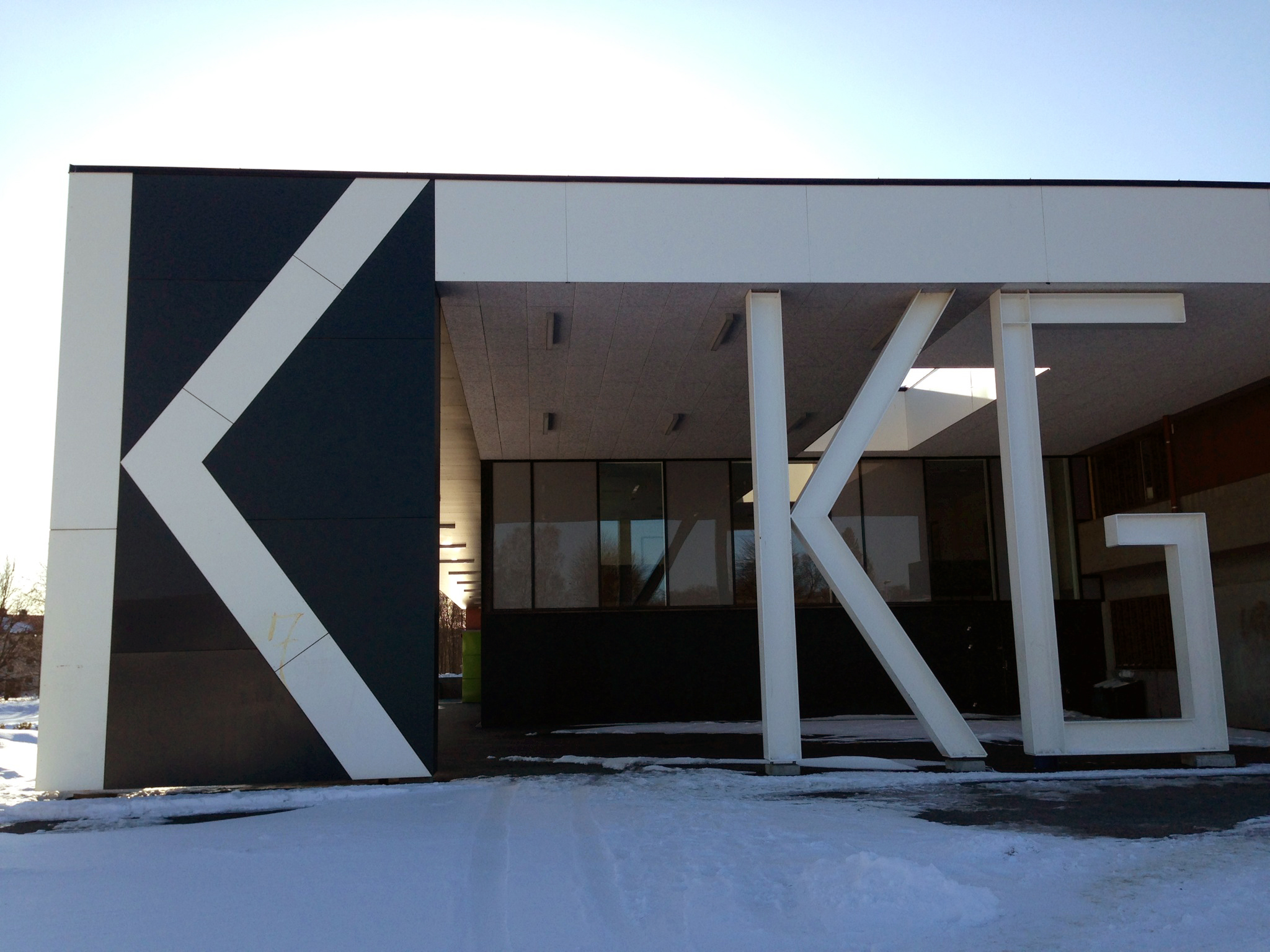
Kristiansand katedralskole Gimle

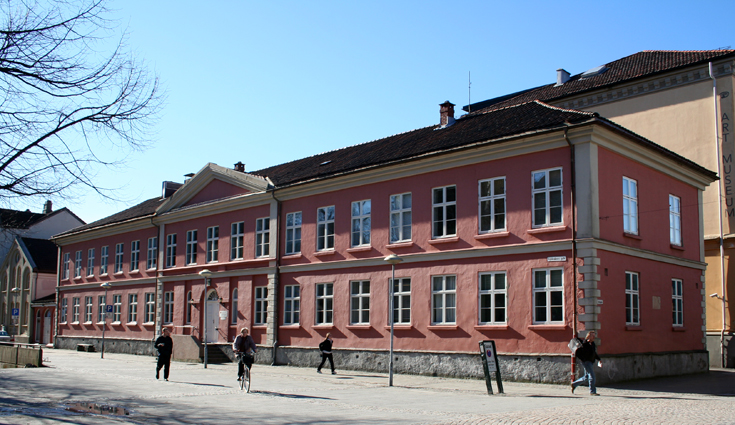
The school building raised in 1737 (after the original school burned down in 1734), rebuilt in 1805/06, and with a second floor added in 1853/54.

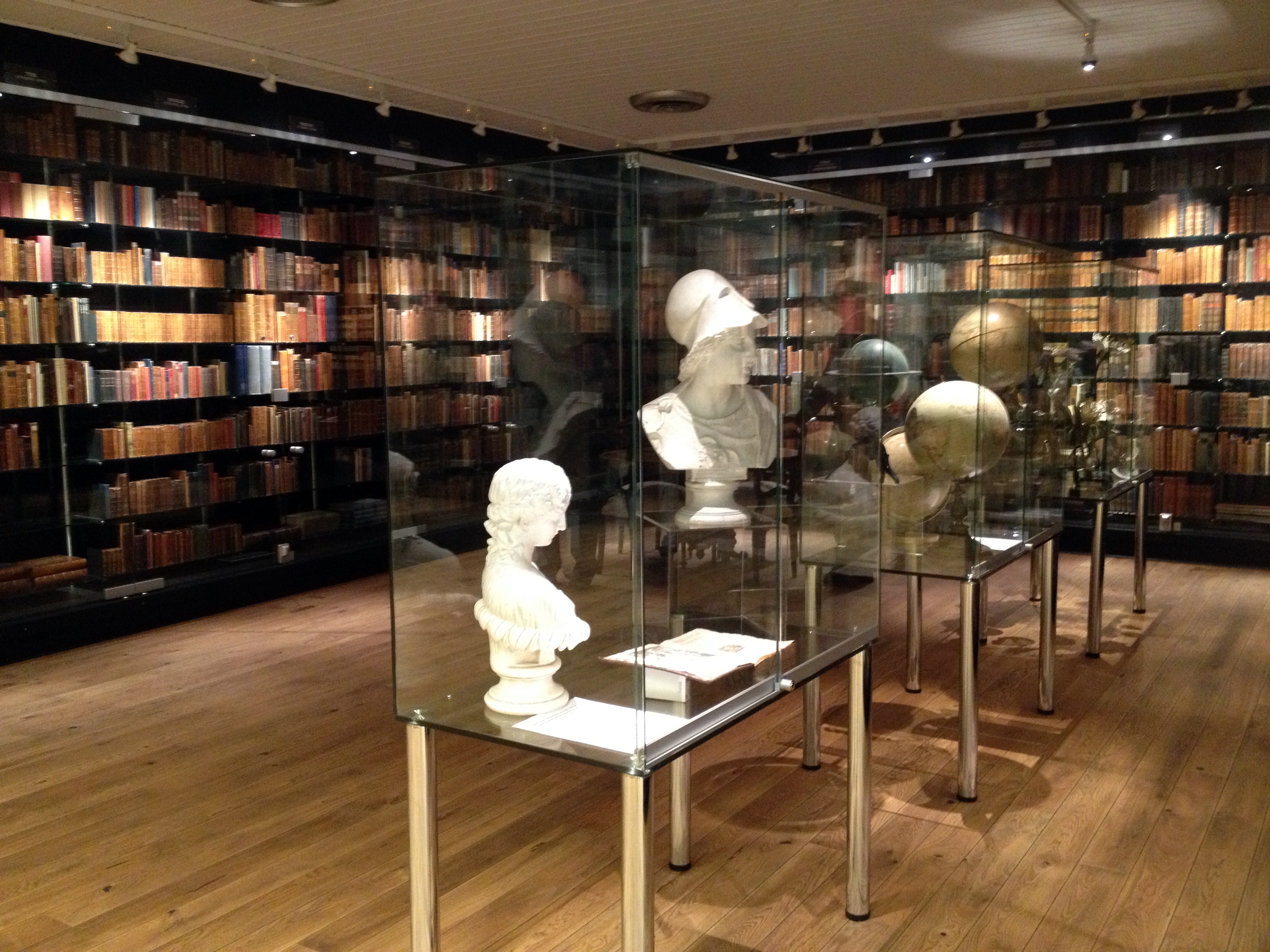
Historic book collection at Kristiansand Cathedral School

Kristiansand Cathedral School (Kristiansand katedralskole Gimle), known in Latin as Schola Christiansandensis, is a high school in Kristiansand, Agder, Norway. It is the oldest high school on the southern coast of Norway, having been founded in 1686. Originally, the school was located near the cathedral in the center of the town of Kristiansand. Although it represents an old institution, Katta is a modern school, offering courses in general and business studies, as well as in health and care. It has an exclusive collection of paintings donated by former student Reidar Wennesland, and some antique books.

== Notable alumni ==
- Mette-Marit Tjessem Høiby, Queen of Norway (spouse of Haakon Magnus, King of Norway)
- Jens Bjørneboe, painter and author
- Bentein Baardson, actor and film director
- Trygve Allister Diesen, writer and film director
- Kristen Gislefoss, meteorologist
- Gaute Heivoll, author
- Herman Smitt Ingebretsen, politician
- Else Marie Jakobsen, designer and textile artist
- Karl Ove Knausgård, author
- Thomas Peter Krag, poet and author
- Vilhelm Krag, author
- Gabriel Langfeldt, psychiatrist
- Jørgen Gunnarson Løvland, politician and editor
- Andreas Munch, writer and author
- Claus Pavels, priest and writer
- Gabriel Scott, author
- Sigmund Skard, professor in American literature
- Andreas Thorkildsen, athlete (Olympic champion)
- Kristoffer Ajer, professional football player
