= Kristen Gislefoss =

Norwegian meteorologist (born 1954)

- Born: 2 May 1954 (age 72); Vennesla, Norway
- Education: Kristiansand Cathedral School, University of Bergen,
- Children: Kristian Gislefoss

Kristen Gislefoss (born 2 May 1954) is a Norwegian meteorologist and weather presenter.

He was born on 2 May 1954, in Vennesla, took his secondary education at Kristiansand Cathedral School and the cand.real. degree at the University of Bergen in 1980. He then took the teachers' seminary before being hired in the Norwegian Meteorological Institute in 1981. In 1990, he became a prime time weather presenter for the Norwegian Broadcasting Corporation.

He resides at Grav and is the father of meteorologist and weather presenter Kristian Gislefoss.
