= Rosapenna =

1983 novel by Ola Bauer

- Author: Ola Bauer
- Language: Norwegian
- Genre: novel
- Published: 1983
- Publication place: Norway

Rosapenna is a novel published in 1983 by the Norwegian writer Ola Bauer. The book introduced Belfast and Northern Ireland into Norwegian literature.

== Context ==
The novel is the fourth in a series about the character "Jo Vendt". The first book, Bauer's debut novel Graffiti published in 1976 under the pseudonym Jo Vendt, describes the principal character's tough childhood as a dropout sent to schools for maladjusted children. The next novel, Bulk (1978), describes "Jo" as a sailor with a background from a debauched life in Oslo. Humlehjertene from 1980 is about the anarchist "Jo Vendt" who travels to Paris in 1968, falls in love with a Finnish girl, and ends up on the barricades with paving stones in his hands.

== Plot ==
The focus in Rosapenna is the conflict in Northern Ireland, which "Jo Vendt" is covering as a journalist. Other central characters in the novel are the English soldier "Sammy Jenkins", who has a background as a poor boy from Whitechapel, and the poor IRA girl "Brigid Doherty". The novel is set in 1973. "Vendt" has been instructed to cover the conflict from a pro British point of view, and is prepared to satisfy the editor in this respect, and to write about James Joyce and Brendan Behan from the cultural side. He eventually gets in contact with IRA people in Ardoyne, an Irish Nationalist district of North Belfast, and move in with a family in the ghetto The Bone. From then on he is on a collision course with his newspaper editor. He becomes disgusted with the misrepresented reports delivered by the journalist corps, and tries to understand the underlying reasons for the conflict in Northern Ireland.

Rosapenna Street is a genuine street in the Bone area of Belfast, adjacent to Ardoyne.

== Play version ==
An episode from Rosapenna was adapted into the audio play Vesper, produced for the Norwegian Broadcasting Corporation theatre Radioteatret and printed in 1987.
