= Thomas Sandem =

Norwegian footballer (born 1973)

Thomas Sandem (born 27 July 1973) is a Norwegian former footballer who played as a goalkeeper for Moss and Vålerenga in the Tippeligaen.

He played for local clubs IL Driv in Ytre Enebakk, Askim and Ski before joining Moss, with whom he was the second-choice goalkeeper and played on several occasions in the Tippeligaen. In 2000, he joined Vålerenga, but only played one Tippeligaen game. He then played for Kvik Halden FK before joining Sparta Sarpsborg. He rejoined Kvik ahead of the 2008 season.

After his retirement, he was used by Kvik as a goalkeeper-reserve during the 2011 season. When he worked as a goalkeeping-goach at Birkebeineren in 2013 he played some matches when their first-choice goalkeeper Thomas Solvoll was injured.
