= Jon Midttun Lie =

Norwegian footballer (born 1980)

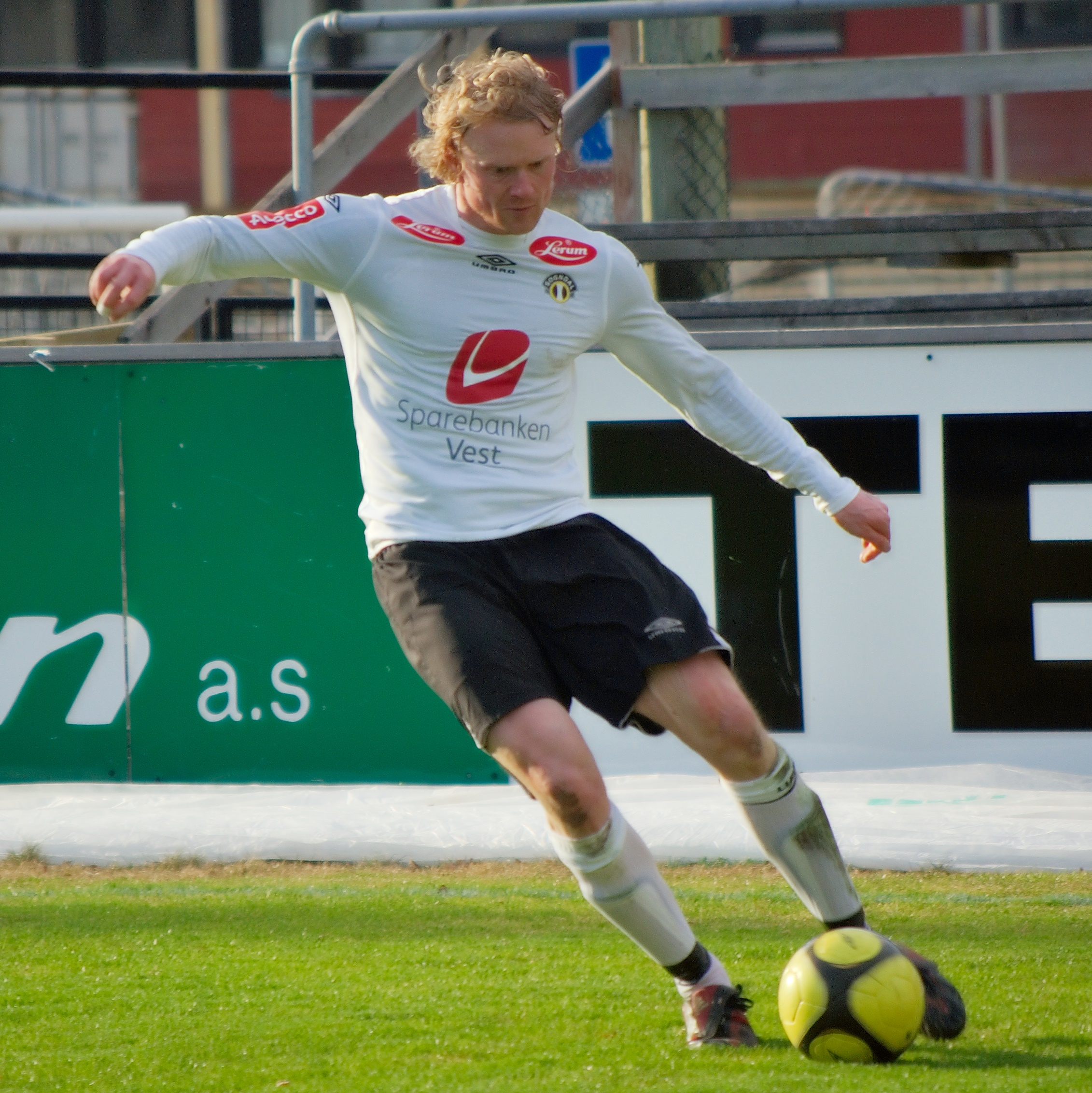

Personal information
- Date of birth: 10 December 1980 (age 45)
- Place of birth: Norway
- Height: 1.81 m (5 ft 11 in)
- Positions: Left winger; left back

Team information
- Current team: Fram Larvik
- Number: 20

Youth career
- Rein
- Helgerød
- 1993–1996: Sandar

Senior career*
Years	Team	Apps	(Gls)
1999–2004	Sandefjord	97	(24)
2005–2007	Start	52	(5)
2008–2009	Lillestrøm	16	(0)
2009	→ Sogndal (loan)	22	(1)
2010–2011	Fram Larvik		

International career
1999	Norway U19	1	(0)
- * Club domestic league appearances and goals

Jon Midttun Lie (born 10 December 1980) is a Norwegian former footballer. During his professional career he played for Sandefjord, Start, Lillestrøm and Sogndal. Midttun Lie played one match for Norway U19 in 1999, and has also played futsal for Sandefjord Futsal.

== Early career ==
Midttun Lie lived in Haukeli until he was 12, where he played football for IL Rein. Midttun Lie moved with his family to Sandefjord in 1992 and started to play football for the local club Sandar IL at the age of 13 after a short spell at Helgerød IL. He later joined Sandefjord BK, where he played for the first team. When Sandefjord BK and IL Runar merged ahead of the 1999 season, Midttun Lie joined the new team Sandefjord Fotball.

== Club career ==
Midttun Lie played 97 matches and scored 24 goals for Sandefjord Fotball from 1999 to 2004 and was used regularly as a winger in Tom Nordlie's 4-3-3 formation except for the 2003-season when he suffered from a knee-injury and was out for 11 months. Nordlie left Sandefjord to coach IK Start ahead of the 2004-season, and Midttun Lie was less important in Arne Dokken's 4-4-2 formation. After the 2004-season Midttun Lie was sold to Start, where he was reunited with Nordlie, who Midttun Lie stated was the best coach he has ever had.

Midttun Lie played 24 matches in his first season with Start, and won a silver-medal when the newly promoted team finished second in Tippeligaen. Midttun Lie suffered from an injury in the 2006 season, and was out for 10 months. He returned in the beginning of the 2007 season and scored a goal in Start's 4–1 loss against Rosenborg on 16 May 2007 which was his second match after the injury. Midttun Lie was sent off in two consecutive matches, first in the league-match against Lillestrøm on 24 June 2007 when he tackled Magnus Myklebust as the last man, and three days later in the cup-match against Manglerud Star. After Start was relegated from Tippeligaen in 2007, Midttun Lie and his team-mate Steinar Pedersen joined Lillestrøm, where Nordlie, their former coach from Start, now were in charge. Midttun Lie played a total of 52 matches for Start in Tippeligaen and scored five goals.

Despite being bought by Nordlie for the second time, Midttun Lie stated that it was the club that made him to transfer to Lillestrøm and not the coach. Midttun Lie made his debut for Lillestrøm in the friendly match against Halmstad but was injured after 38 minutes Midttun Lie was away for a month, and played his second match for Lillestrøm in the friendly against Algeciras on 20 March 2008, ten days before the opening match of the 2008 season. Nordlie resigned as head coach in May 2008, and Midttun Lie did not play much under the new head coach Henning Berg and ahead of the 2009 season Lillestrøm wanted send Midttun Lie on loan. Nordlie, who coached Midttun Lie at Sandefjord, Start and Lillestrøm was now head coach of Kongsvinger and was interested in getting Midttun Lie on loan, along with Sogndal, Løv-Ham and Nybergsund. Midttun Lie joined Sogndal on a season-long loan-deal on 16 March 2009 He played a total of 22 matches for Sogndal in the 2009 season when the team finished fourth in the First Division.

Lillestrøm and Midttun Lie agreed on terminating his contract after the 2009 season, and Midttun Lie spent time on a trials with Odd Grenland in December 2009 and Lyn in March 2010 but did not get a contract with a new club. After he started studying physical therapy, Midttun Lie joined the Second Division side Fram Larvik for the rest of the season in August 2010. In January 2011 he decided to play for Fram Larvik until the summer, when he was going to travel to the Netherlands to continue studying physical therapy. Midttun Lie did however miss the entire 2011 season after getting injured in a friendly match against Kvik Halden in March 2011.

== International career ==
Midttun Lie has represented Norway once, when he played for the under-19 team against Spain U19 in May 1999.

== Futsal career ==
Midttun Lie has also played futsal for Sandefjord Futsal, and scored three goals in his debut against Nordpolen Futsal in January 2010.
