= Ola Bauer =

Norwegian novelist and playwright

- Born: 24 July 1943; Oslo, Norway
- Died: 12 June 1999 (aged 55)
- Occupations: novelist, playwright, journalist
- Writing career
- Notable works: Graffiti (1976); Humlehjertene (1980); Rosapenna (1983)

Ola Bauer (24 July 1943 – 12 June 1999) was a Norwegian novelist and playwright. He made his literary debut with the novel Graffiti in 1976, under the pseudonym Jo Vendt. Among his best known books are Humlehjertene (1980), Rosapenna (1983), and Metoden (1985). Bauer was awarded Gyldendal's Endowment in 1982, and the Dobloug Prize in 1998. He died of cancer in 1999.

== Early life ==
Bauer was born 24 July 1943 in Holmenkollåsen, Oslo, during the German occupation of Norway. His father was a baker, and an active member of the Norwegian resistance movement. In 1943, he was arrested, while the rest of the family went undercover in Hadeland. Bauer's father was eventually deported to the Sachsenhausen concentration camp, where he died three months before the end of the war. Bauer's family continuously moved from place to place, and Bauer had a hard time adjusting to the changes, and finding friends. He found himself consistently making friends with children of traitors, those who had supported the Germans during the war. "We were all innocent children, who had to pay for our fathers' choices. We could understand each other", Bauer later said. He used to make up stories about his father's death, a new version for every new place his family moved. He graduated from Oslo Språkskole in 1965, on his second attempt, "with a D in Norwegian, as usual".

Bauer started his literary career translating short stories from Danish to Norwegian for Allers. He quickly advanced to becoming sports reporter for Det Nye, and later a traveling journalist for Vi Menn. He stayed in Paris for more than a year in the late 1960s, and later traveled around Africa. From 1972 on he made frequent visits to Belfast, and made many friends there.

== Literary career ==
Bauer had grown up with the notion that his father was a war hero, having died as a prisoner of war. As an adult, he learned that his father had in fact died of methanol poisoning, having gotten hold of what he thought was alcohol. In his autobiographical debut novel, Graffiti (1976), Bauer confronted his mother with the fact that she had kept this secret from him. "I grew up in a lie about a man I have never known", he commented. Because of the novel's contents, one of his relatives insisted that he publish it under a pseudonym, to protect his mother. Despite "having nothing to hide [him]self", he therefore released the novel under the pen name Jo Vendt. Graffiti was very well received by critics. Roar Petersen of Verdens Gang noted the poetic quality of many of the passages in the novel. Johan Borgen described the debut as "measuring 7.3 on the Richter earthquake scale".

Bauer published the freestanding sequel to Graffiti, Bulk (1978), under his own name. The novel depicts a young man returning to Oslo after spending some time at sea. Alcoholism is a central theme, both the protagonist and his mother are portrayed as heavy drinkers. His next novel, Humlehjertene (1980), depicts the protagonist's stay in Paris from 1967 to 1969, where he becomes involved in the May 1968 student riots. The novel was heavily based on Bauer's own experiences from Paris during the same period. "I suppose every writer actually writes about themselves", he told Verdens Gang. The Troubles in Northern Ireland would become the topic of Rosapenna (1983), named after a street in Belfast. Bauer felt that the Norwegian press was giving a one-sided picture of The Troubles, something he wanted to correct. To get the necessary distance to the source material, he decided to let the novel take place in 1973. Bauer himself arrived in Belfast in 1972, shortly after the Bloody Sunday, as a journalist for Vi Menn. He became an eyewitness to the bombing of the Abercorn restaurant in Castle Lane. Bauer could not believe the IRA was responsible for the bombing, and defended them in Vi Menn. He eventually became closely involved with the IRA. "England is to blame for the conflict in Northern Ireland. The antagonism is based on economic differences ... this is not a religious war", Bauer said in an interview shortly after the release of Rosapenna. Bauer's 1985 novel Metoden introduced the protagonist Bo Brandt, the son of a wealthy, alcoholized, ship-owner. The novel serves both as a crime thriller and a psychological study.

Bauer's last novels would revolve around Tom, who starts out as a ten-year-old in Hestehodetåken (1992), and returns as a teenager in Svartefot (1995), and a twenty-year-old in Magenta (1997). Bauer referred to the books as "a reluctant trilogy". In the fourth novel in the series, Forløperen (1999), Tom returns to Norway after spending forty years traveling abroad. The book was finished while Bauer was terminally ill, and released posthumously.

Aside from his novels, Bauer was also a playwright. Two of his plays, Vesper (1987) and Brendan (1993), depict the conflict in Northern Ireland.

== Death and legacy ==
Bauer died 12 June 1999, having been diagnosed with cancer one and a half years before then.

Bauer had been involved in a dramatic television production, Jakttid, but as his condition worsened, he prioritized finishing his last novel, Forløperen. It was published 26 August 1999. Three years later, an anthology was published in Bauer's honor. Bauers bok, edited by Lars Saabye Christensen, contained contributions by among others Christensen, Kjartan Fløgstad, Espen Haavardsholm, Per Petterson, Dag Solstad, and Tove Nilsen. He was described by Solstad as extremely well-read, being particularly interested in authors like Louis-Ferdinand Céline and Jean Genet. In the anthology, Petterson compared Bauer's protagonists to Holden Caulfield of The Catcher in the Rye, a novel important to Bauer.

Bauer was survived by his wife Anne Gun, and his daughter, Anya Bauer Hartmark, born in 1972. Bauer had wanted her to be named "Mulele", after Pierre Mulele, and Bauer and his friends would refer to her using the nickname Mulle as a tribute to the Congolese revolutionary.

== Bibliography ==
=== Novels ===
- Graffiti (1976)
- Bulk (1978)
- Humlehjertene (1980)
- Rosapenna (1983)
- Metoden (1985)
- Løvetemmersken (1988)
- Hestehodetåken (1992)
- Svartefot (1995)
- Magenta (1997)
- Forløperen (1999)

=== Plays ===
- Mellomkrig (1986)
- Vesper (1987)
- Brendan (1993)
- Mater (1994)
