= Viktor Bjarki Arnarsson =

Icelandic footballer

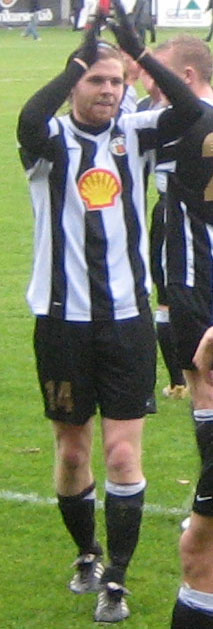
- Viktor Bjarki Arnarsson in 2008

Personal information
- Full name: Viktor Bjarki Arnarsson
- Date of birth: 22 January 1983 (age 43)
- Place of birth: Reykjavík, Iceland
- Height: 1.78 m (5 ft 10 in)
- Position: Midfielder

Team information
- Current team: HK

Youth career
- 1996–1999: Vikingur

Senior career*
Years	Team	Apps	(Gls)
1999–2002	FC Utrecht	?	(?)
2002–2003	TOP Oss	33	(4)
2004	Vikingur	15	(2)
2005	→ Fylkir (loan)	16	(5)
2006	Vikingur	18	(8)
2007–2009	Lillestrøm	0	(0)
2008	→ KR Reykjavik (loan)	19	(1)
2009–2010	Nybergsund IL-Trysil	19	(1)
2010–2012	KR Reykjavik	60	(7)
2013–2014	Fram Reykjavik	40	(3)
2015–2017	Víkingur	42	(0)
2018	HK	13	(0)

International career
1999	Iceland U-17	9	(2)
2000–2001	Iceland U-19	9	(0)
2002–2005	Iceland U-21	12	(0)
- * Club domestic league appearances and goals as of 23 May 2018

Viktor Bjarki Arnarsson (born 22 January 1983 in Reykjavík, Iceland) is a retired football player who last played for Handknattleiksfélag Kópavogs.

== Career ==
After being awarded 'Player of the Year' in the Icelandic Úrvalsdeild with Víkingur, he signed for Norwegian side Lillestrøm in 2006, but was loaned to KR Reykjavik for the 2008-season, and then went back to Lillestrøm after the season.

In 2009, he signed a one-year contract with Nybergsund IL-Trysil in the Norwegian Adeccoligaen following his spell in Sweden.

After being released from Nybergsund IL-Trysil, Arnarsson went back to Iceland to play for KR Reykjavik and Fram Reykjavik before ultimately returning to his home club Víkingur.

Viktor previously played for TOP Oss in the Dutch Eerste Divisie.
