= Katrine Lunde =

Norwegian handball player (born 1980)

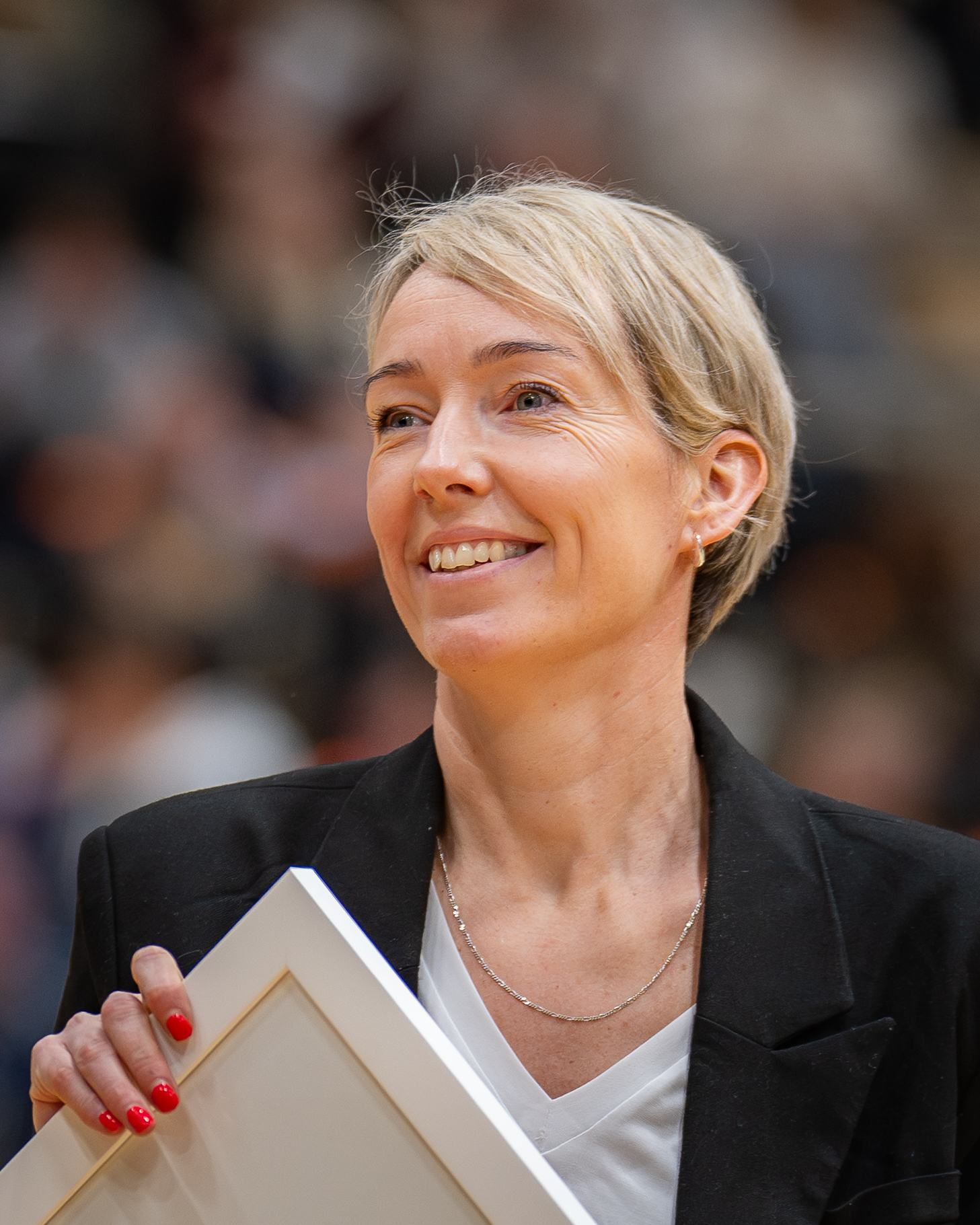
- Lunde in 2026

Personal information
- Nationality: Norwegian
- Born: 30 March 1980 (age 46) Kristiansand, Norway
- Height: 1.80 m (5 ft 11 in)

Sport
- Sport: Handball
- Position: Goalkeeper
- Current club: Retired

Youth career
- Years: Team
- –: Hånes IF

Senior clubs
- Years: Team
- –2004: Våg Vipers
- 2004–2007: Aalborg DH
- 2007–2010: Viborg HK
- 2010–2015: Győri ETO KC
- 2015–2017: Rostov-Don
- 2017–01/2025: Vipers Kristiansand
- 01/2025–06/2025: Odense Håndbold
- 2025: ŽRK Crvena Zvezda
- 2026: Randesund IL
National team
Years	Team	Apps	(Gls)
2002–2026	Norway	389	(3)

Teams managed
- 2025–: Randesund IL (goalkeeping coach)
Medal record
Olympic Games
Gold medal – first place	2008 Beijing	Team
Gold medal – first place	2012 London	Team
Gold medal – first place	2024 Paris	Team
Bronze medal – third place	2016 Rio de Janeiro	Team
Bronze medal – third place	2020 Tokyo	Team
World Championship
Gold medal – first place	2011 Brazil
Gold medal – first place	2021 Spain
Gold medal – first place	2025 Germany/Netherlands
Silver medal – second place	2007 France
Silver medal – second place	2017 Germany
Silver medal – second place	2023 Denmark/Norway/Sweden
Bronze medal – third place	2009 China
European Championship
Gold medal – first place	2004 Hungary
Gold medal – first place	2006 Sweden
Gold medal – first place	2008 Macedonia
Gold medal – first place	2010 Norway/Denmark
Gold medal – first place	2020 Denmark
Gold medal – first place	2022 Slovenia/North Macedonia /Montenegro
Gold medal – first place	2024 Austria/Hungary/Switzerland
Silver medal – second place	2002 Denmark
Silver medal – second place	2012 Serbia

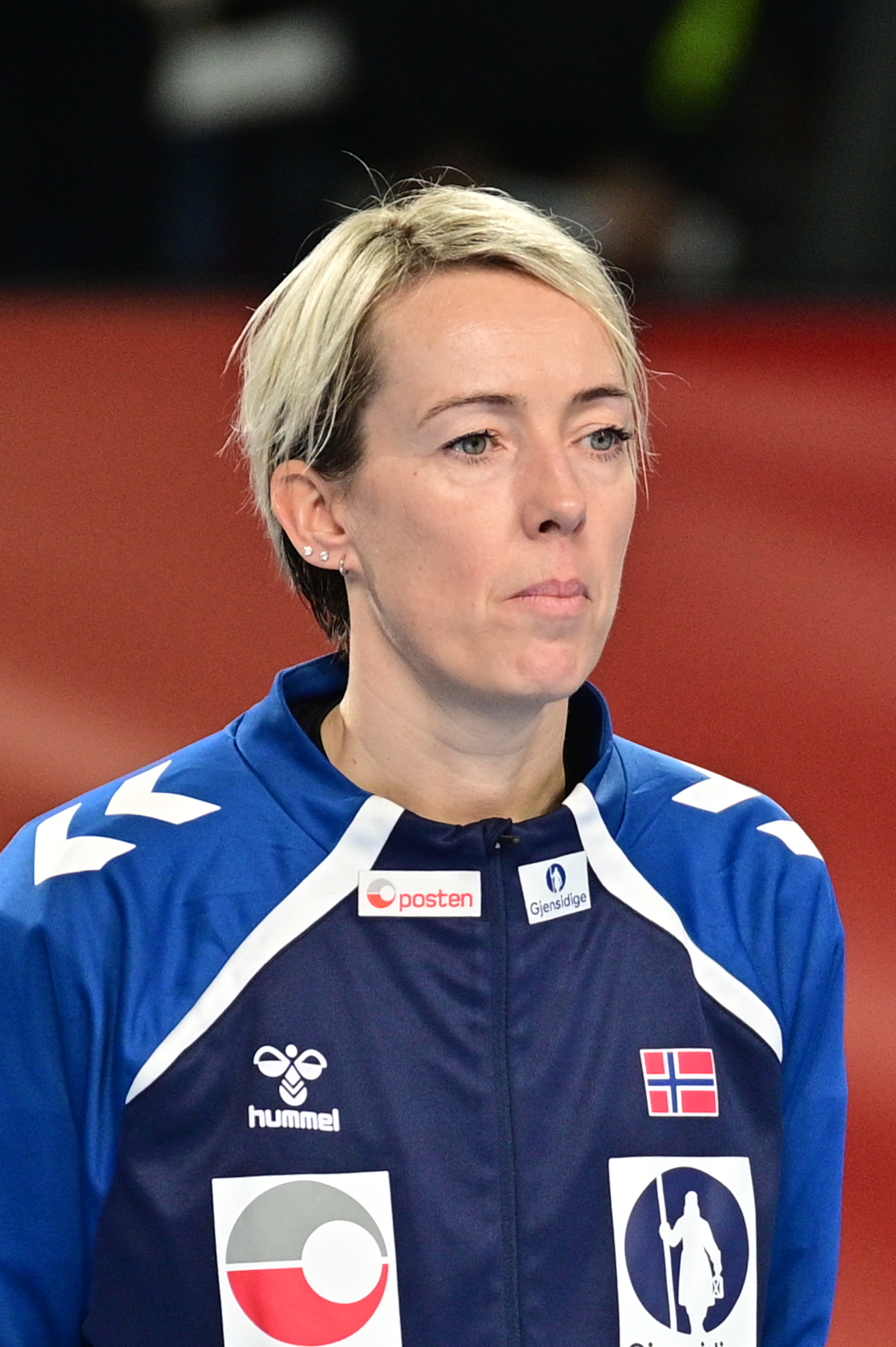
Lunde in 2024

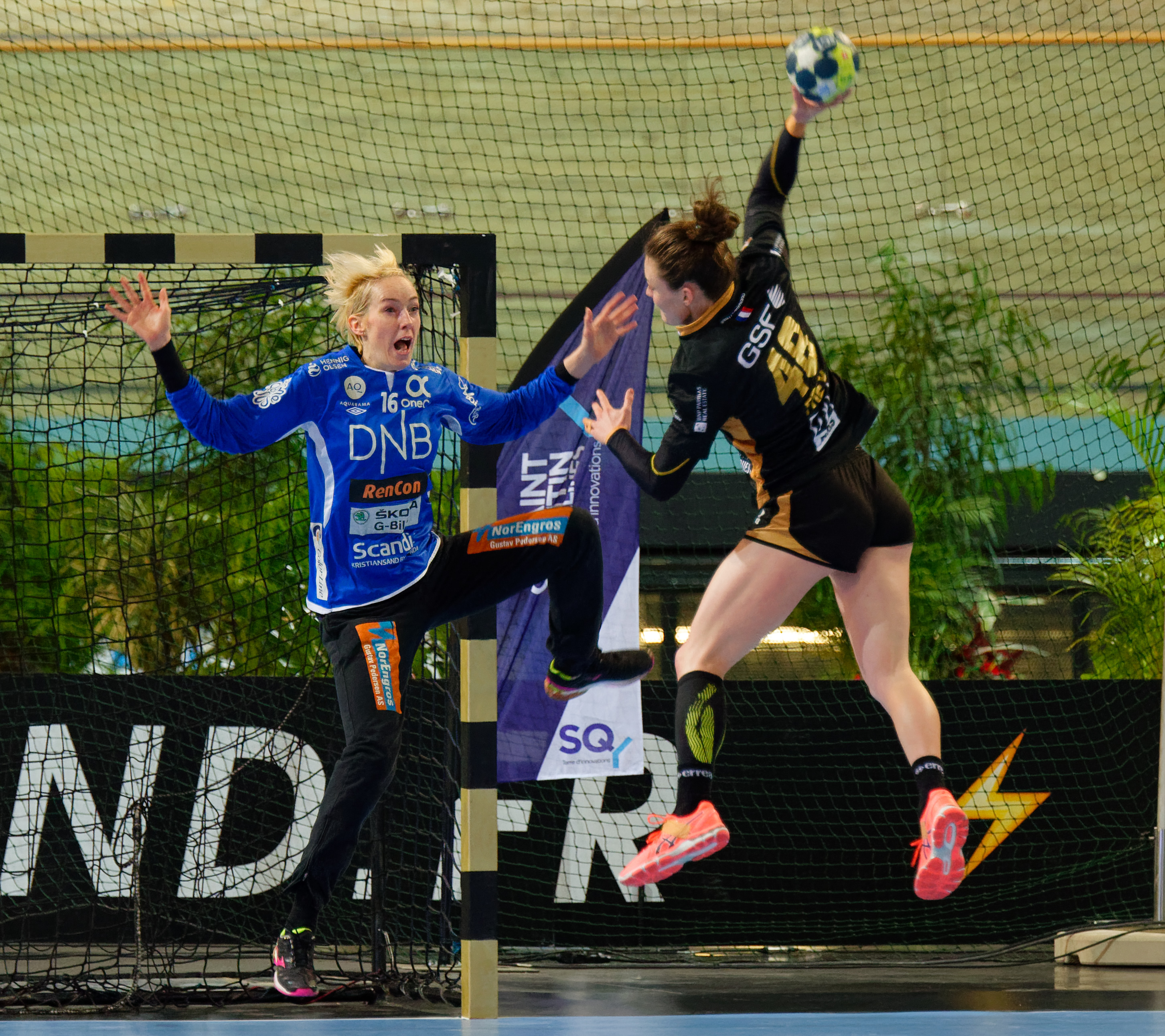
Lunde on 3 February 2018

Katrine Lunde (former Haraldsen; born 30 March 1980) is a retired Norwegian handball player, who last played for the Norwegian national team and Randesund IL.

Considered one of the best players of all time, her sporting achievements include gold medals with the Norwegian national team at the Olympic Games, World Championships and European Championships, as well as club victories in the EHF Champions League, and national championships in Denmark, Hungary, Russia and Norway. She holds numerous records in the game, including most gold medals, most appearances at major international tournaments, most caps on the Norwegian national team, and oldest player on the Norwegian national team.

She is the twin sister of fellow handball player Kristine Lunde-Borgersen.

== Personal life ==
Lunde was born in Kristiansand on 30 March 1980, and is the twin sister of Kristine Lunde-Borgersen. She was previously married to former football player Tom Reidar Haraldsen and is currently in a relationship with Nikola Trajković, a football coach from Serbia. They have one daughter together.

== Career ==
=== Club ===
She started her club career in Hånes, and later played for Kristiansand, Våg and Aalborg DH. With Aalborg she reached the semifinal of the EHF Champions League in 2005-06, which was the first international semifinal for the club.

In 2007 she joined Viborg HK together with her twin sister. She won the Champions League with Viborg HK in 2009 and 2010. She also won three Danish Championships and two Danish Cups with the club. In 2010, she signed with Hungarian club Győri ETO KC. Here she won two additional Champions League titles. In 2015, she signed with Russian club Rostov-Don. After two years spent in Russia she returned to Norway to Join Vipers Kristiansand on a three year deal. Here she was the club captain. Her contract with Vipers Kristiansand was valid until 2025. With Vipers she won the EHF Champions League in 2021 which was the first in club history. She then won it again in 2022 and 2023.

She left Vipers Kristiansand in January 2025 when the club went bankrupt and ceased activities. A month later she joined Danish side Odense Håndbold. She has said, that she did consider retiring after Vipers went bankrupt, but she felt that it was not the right way to end her career. Odense Håndbold offered her a contract, as their first choice goalkeeper, Danish national team goalkeeper Althea Reinhardt, was out with a concussion. When Reinhardt returned in April 2025, Lunde, Reinhardt and the Dutch national team goalkeeper Yara ten Holte all competed for playing time.

In the 2024-25 season, she achieved a perfect regular season with Odense Håndbold, winning 26 of 26 games. Later the same season she won the Danish Championship, when Odense beat Team Esbjerg in the final 2-1 in matches.

In the summer of 2025 she joined Serbian club ŽRK Crvena Zvezda on a six month contract.

=== International ===
Lunde made her debut on the Norwegian national team in 2002. She is a six-time European champion (2004, 2006, 2008, 2010, 2020, 2022). She is World champion from 2011, received a silver medal at the 2007 World Women's Handball Championship, and a bronze medal at the 2009 World Championship. In August 2008, together with her twin sister, she won the gold medal at the 2008 Summer Olympics in Beijing. She was selected into the tournament's All-Star Team, and was also overall top goalkeeper with a 42% save rate.

Lunde was again named goalkeeper of the All-Star Team in the 2008 European Championship and ranked second on the Top Goalkeepers list with a 47% save rate.

She was also part of the Norwegian team that won the gold medal at the 2012 Summer Olympics.

She won a gold medal with the Norwegian team at the 2024 Summer Olympics, and was also named by IHF the most valuable player at the tournament. This was her fifth Olympic medal from five different Olympics: three gold and two bronze.

Lunde has participated in 25 international championships for the national team, which is a world record. She announced that she would retire for the Norwegian national team in major tournaments after the 2025 World Women's Handball Championship. The final against Germany was her last ever match. Norway won gold medals and Lunde had a save percentage of 41%. She also had the best save percentage in the entire tournament with 48% and made the tournament all-star team.

== Achievements ==
- Olympic Games:
  - Winner: 2008, 2012, 2024
  - Bronze Medalist: 2016, 2020
- World Championship:
  - Winner: 2011, 2021, 2025
  - Silver Medalist: 2007, 2017, 2023
  - Bronze Medalist: 2009
- European Championship:
  - Winner: 2004, 2006, 2008, 2010, 2020, 2022, 2024
  - Silver Medalist: 2002, 2012
- Damehåndboldligaen:
  - Winner: 2008, 2009, 2010, 2025
  - Silver Medalist: 2005
  - Bronze Medalist: 2006, 2007
- DHF Landspokalturneringen:
  - Winner: 2007, 2008
- Nemzeti Bajnokság I:
  - Winner: 2011, 2012, 2013, 2014
  - Silver Medalist: 2015
- Magyar Kupa:
  - Winner: 2011, 2012, 2013, 2014, 2015
- EHF Champions League:
  - Winner: 2009, 2010, 2013, 2014, 2021, 2022, 2023
  - Finalist: 2012, 2025
  - Bronze Medalist: 2019
  - Semifinalist: 2006, 2011
- EHF Cup:
  - Winner: 2017
  - Finalist: 2018
  - Semifinalist: 2004
- Norwegian League:
  - Winner: 2017/2018, 2018/2019, 2019/2020, 2020/2021, 2021/2022, 2022/2023, 2023/2024
- Norwegian Cup:
  - Winner: 2017, 2018, 2019, 2020, 2021, 2022/23, 2023/24

== Individual awards ==
- Most Valuable Player of the Summer Olympics: 2024
- All-Star Goalkeeper of the Olympic Games: 2008, 2020
- All-Star Goalkeeper of the European Championship: 2008, 2010, 2012
- Foreign Handballer of the Year in Hungary: 2013
- All-Star Goalkeeper of the World Championship: 2017, 2025
- All-Star Goalkeeper of the Champions League: 2019
- All-Star Goalkeeper of Eliteserien: 2018/2019, 2020/2021, 2021/2022,
- EHF Excellence Awards Best goalkeeper of the season: 2022/23, 2024/25
- EHF Excellence Awards MVP: 2022/23
- Female sportsperson of the year at the Idrettsgallaen: 2009
- Team player of the year at the Idrettsgallaen: 2009
- Sportsperson of the year at the Idrettsgallaen: 2026

== See also ==
- List of multiple Olympic gold medalists in one event
- List of multiple Olympic medalists in one event
