= Henry Reinholdt =

Norwegian footballer (1890-1980)

Personal information
- Date of birth: 16 January 1890
- Place of birth: Skien, Norway
- Date of death: 1 February 1980 (aged 90)

Senior career*
Years	Team	Apps	(Gls)
- Odds Ballklubb

International career
- Norway
- * Club domestic league appearances and goals

Henry Reinholdt (16 January 1890 – 1 February 1980) was a Norwegian football player.

== Biography ==
Reinholdt was born in Skien. He played for the club Odd, and also for the Norwegian national team. He competed at the 1912 Summer Olympics in Stockholm. He was Norwegian champion with Odd in 1913 and 1915.
