= Kristian Gislefoss =

Norwegian meteorologist (born 1980)

Kristian Gislefoss (born 13 October 1980) is a Norwegian meteorologist and weather presenter.

He was born on 13 October 1980, in Bergen, the son of meteorologist and weather presenter Kristen Gislefoss. He grew up in Bærum after his family moved there. He took his secondary education at Eikeli Upper Secondary School.

In 2011, he became a prime time weather presenter for the Norwegian Broadcasting Corporation. He resides at Eiksmarka.
