= Rolf Jarle Brøske =

Norwegian politician (born 1980)

Rolf Jarle Brøske (born 28 June 1980) is a Norwegian politician for the Conservative Party.

He served as a deputy representative to the Norwegian Parliament from Møre og Romsdal during the terms 2001–2005 and 2005–2009. From February to May 2005, during the second cabinet Bondevik, he was appointed political advisor in the Norwegian Ministry of Trade and Industry.
