= Humlehjertene =

1980 novel by Ola Bauer

- First edition
- Author: Ola Bauer
- Language: Norwegian
- Genre: novel
- Published: 1980
- Publisher: Gyldendal
- Publication place: Norway

Humlehjertene (English: The Bumblebee Hearts) is a novel published in 1980 by the Norwegian writer Ola Bauer. The narrator travels to Paris, falls in love with the Finnish girl "Marja", and ends up on the barricades with paving stones in his hands. As a former journalist Bauer had been in Paris during the May 1968 events. Bauer was awarded the Gyldendal's Endowment for his literary works in 1982.

The novel is the third in a series about the character "Jo Vendt". The independent sequel Rosapenna was published in 1983.
