= Tom Reidar Haraldsen =

Norwegian footballer (born 1980)

Personal information
- Date of birth: 29 August 1980 (age 46)
- Place of birth: Norway
- Position: Defender

Team information
- Current team: Moss
- Number: 19

Senior career*
Years	Team	Apps	(Gls)
1998–2001	Start	2	(0)
2002	Oslo Øst	30	(15)
2003–2006	Moss	70	(7)
2006–2007	Viborg	3	(0)
2008	Sandnes Ulf	27	(7)
2009–2010	Bryne	13	(0)
2010	Moss	1	(0)
- * Club domestic league appearances and goals as of 7 April 2009

Tom Reidar Haraldsen (born 29 August 1980) is a Norwegian former football defender.

== Private ==
He is the brother of fellow footballer Knut Henry Haraldsen. Between 2007 and 2012 he was married to handball world and olympic champion Katrine Lunde.
