= Thomas Solvoll =

Norwegian footballer (born 1980)

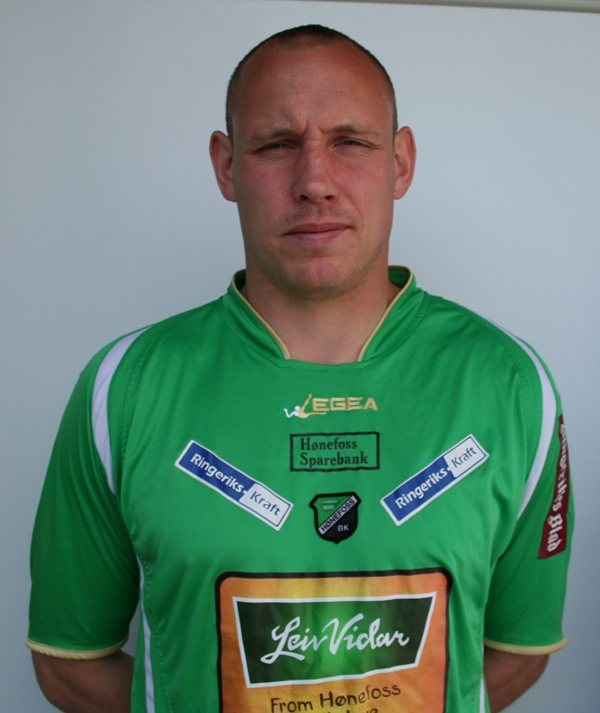

Personal information
- Full name: Thomas Solvoll
- Date of birth: 22 November 1980 (age 45)
- Place of birth: Drammen, Norway
- Height: 1.88 m (6 ft 2 in)
- Position: Goalkeeper

Senior career*
Years	Team	Apps	(Gls)
- Birkebeineren
- Mjøndalen
2000–2003	Strømsgodset	55	(0)
2004–2011	Hønefoss	157	(0)
2012–2014	Birkebeineren	74	(0)
2015	Modum FK	15	(0)
2017	Birkebeineren	2	(0)
- * Club domestic league appearances and goals as of 1 December 2017

Thomas Solvoll (born 22 November 1980) is a Norwegian former football goalkeeper.

He joined Hønefoss in 2004, having previously played for IF Birkebeineren, Mjøndalen IF as well as Strømsgodset IF in the Norwegian Premier League. Solvoll played 166 games for Hønefoss before leaving in 2011.

== Career statistics ==
Club	Season	Division	League		Cup		Total	
Club	Season	Division	Apps	Goals	Apps	Goals	Apps	Goals
Strømsgodset	2000	Adeccoligaen	3	0	0	0	3	0
Strømsgodset	2001	Tippeligaen	7	0	2	0	9	0
Strømsgodset	2002	Adeccoligaen	28	0	3	0	31	0
Strømsgodset	2003	Adeccoligaen	17	0	3	0	20	0
Strømsgodset	Total		55	0	10	0	65	0
Hønefoss BK	2004	Adeccoligaen	30	0	0	0	30	0
Hønefoss BK	2005	Adeccoligaen	30	0	6	0	36	0
Hønefoss BK	2006	Adeccoligaen	29	0	0	0	29	0
Hønefoss BK	2007	Adeccoligaen	23	0	0	0	23	0
Hønefoss BK	2008	Adeccoligaen	28	0	0	0	28	0
Hønefoss BK	2009	Adeccoligaen	29	0	1	0	30	0
Hønefoss BK	2010	Tippeligaen	24	0	3	0	27	0
Hønefoss BK	2011	Adeccoligaen	0	0	1	0	1	0
Hønefoss BK	Total		157	0	9	0	166	0
IF Birkebeineren	2012	Oddsen-ligaen avd 1	24	0	1	0	25	0
IF Birkebeineren	2013	Oddsen-ligaen avd 1	25	0	2	0	27	0
IF Birkebeineren	2014	Oddsen-ligaen avd 1	25	0	1	0	26	0
IF Birkebeineren	Total		74	0	4	0	78	0
Modum FK	2015	3.div Menn avd 04	15	0	2	0	17	0
IF Birkebeineren	2017	5. div menn	2	0	0	0	2	0
Career Total			339	0	25	0	364	0
