= Child labour in the British Industrial Revolution =

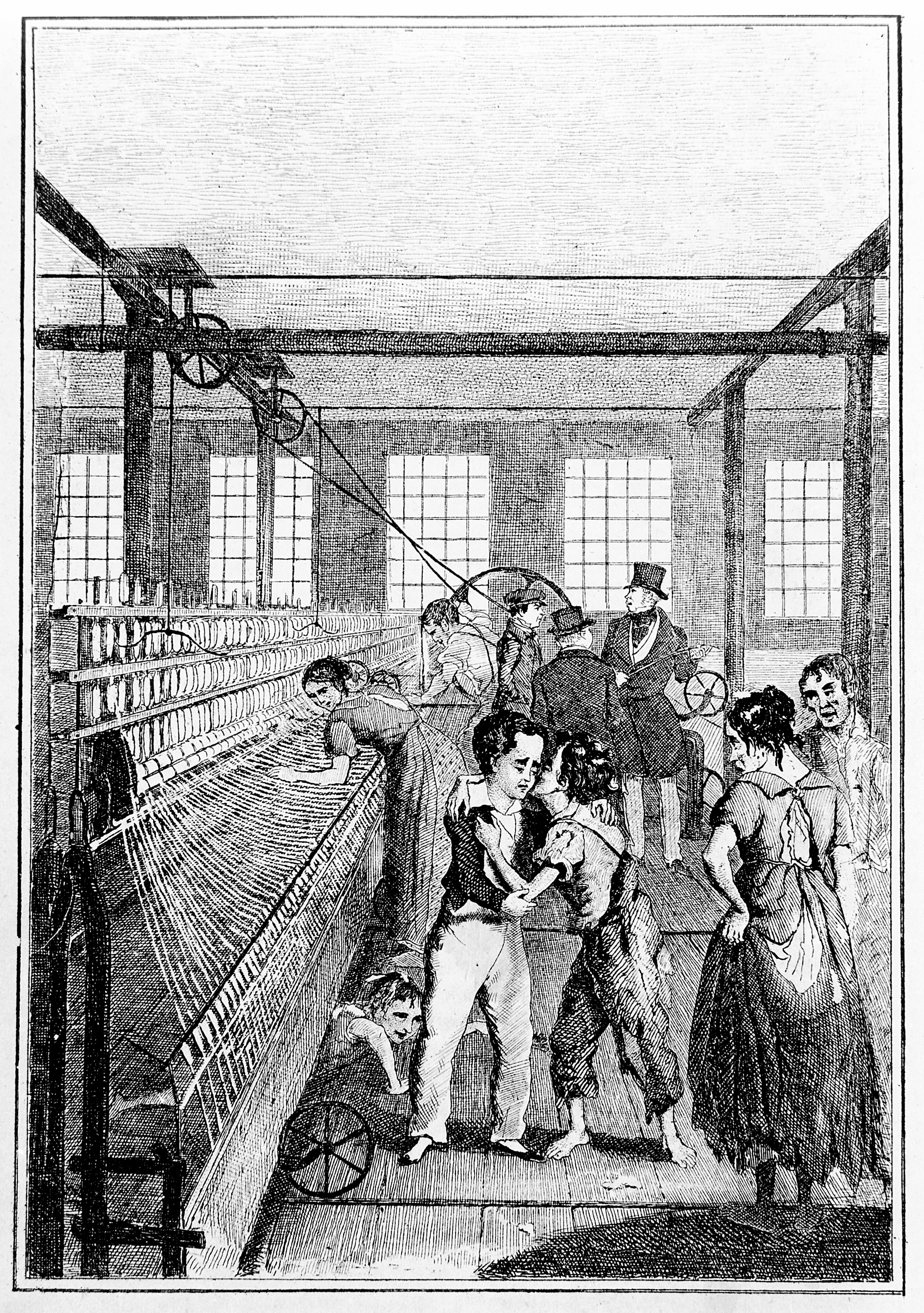
An 1876 illustration of children working in a British textile factory

When the Industrial Revolution began, industrialists used children as a workforce. Children as young as four and five years old often worked the same 12-hour shifts as adults, although some worked shifts as long as 14 hours. By the 1820s, 50% of English workers were under the age of 20. Many workers under 12 were employed by their parents (not directly by the business owner), and worked alongside parents in support roles. According to the Census of 1851, the majority of working children were not in factories, but were filling traditional roles, especially farming and domestic service. The 1851 Census shows that 98 per cent of children under the age of 10 did not work regularly for wages. Of children aged 10 to 14, 72% were either attending school or unoccupied.

== Consequences ==
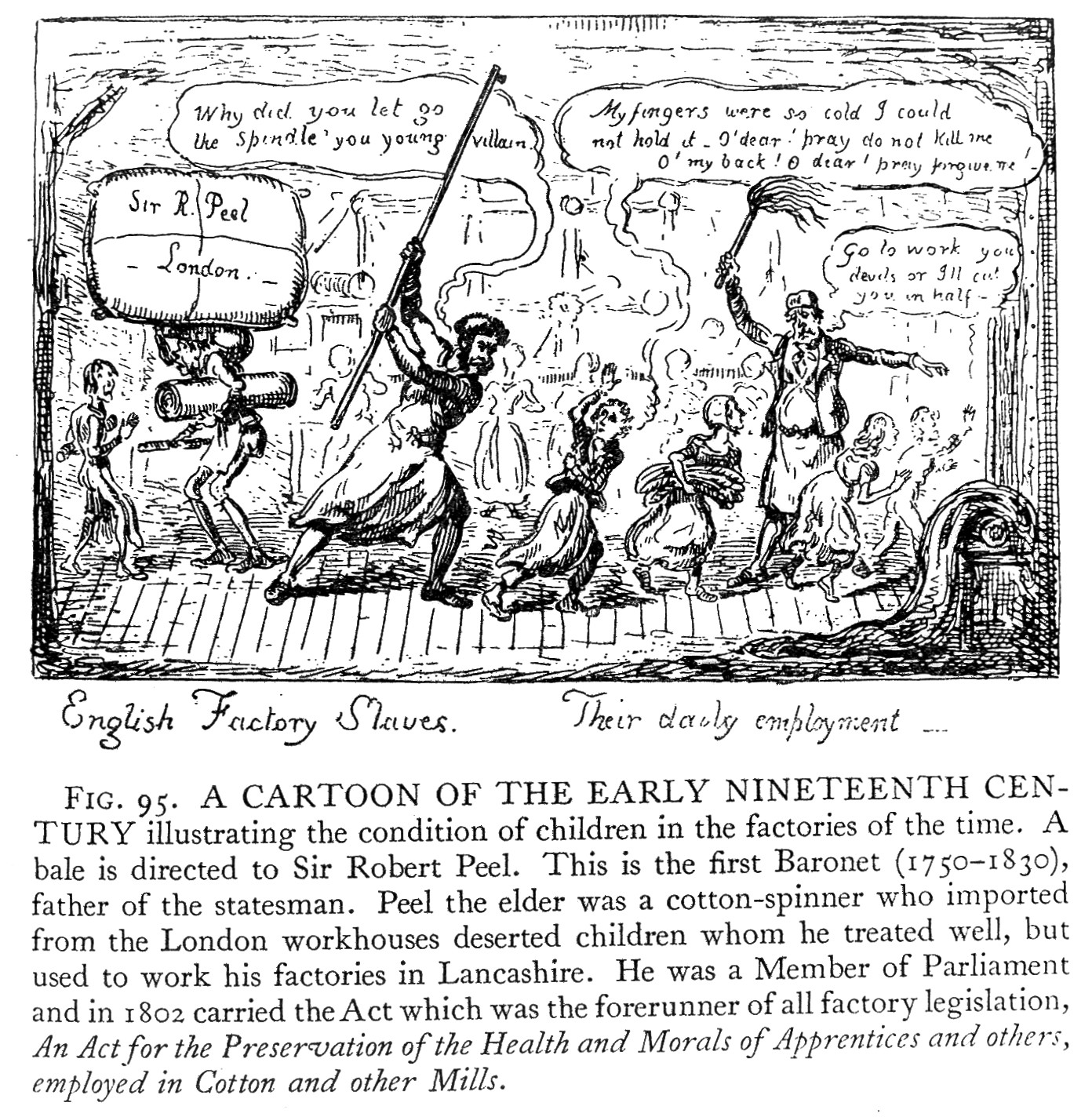
A political cartoon from the early nineteenth century illustrating the working conditions of children

Child labour brought down adult wages due to competition and brought no net benefit to working-class families.

Child labourers never had more than three years of schooling.

Child labourers developed occupational diseases later in life. Breathing in coal dust caused child labourers to later develop lung diseases. Children who worked as chimney sweeps later developed chimney sweeps' carcinoma, a squamous cell carcinoma of the scrotum. The disease was recognised by Percivall Pott and was the first reported form of occupational cancer.

Men who had been child labourers were often unable to raise their own children without condemning them to child labour as well. This deleterious cycle not only impacted the health of current generations, but also future generations.

== Statistics ==
From 1800 to 1850, children made up 20% to 50% of the mining workforce. In 1842, children made up over 25% of all mining workers.

Children made up 33% of factory workers.

In 1819, 4.5% of all cotton workers were under the age of 10 and 54.5% were under the age of 19. In 1833, children made up around 33% to 66% of all workers in textile mills. In the same year, 10% to 20% of all workers in cotton, wool, flax, and silk mills were under the age of 13, and 23% to 57% of all workers in those same mills were 13 to 18 years old. Between 1/6 and 1/5 of all workers in textile towns were under the age of 14 in the same year.

In 1841, the most three common jobs for boys under 20 were agricultural labourer (196,640), domestic servant (90,464), and cotton manufacturer (44,833). The three most common jobs for girls under 20 were domestic servant (346,079), cotton manufacturer (62,131), and dressmaker (22,174). The most common jobs for boys under 15 were agricultural labourer (82,259), messenger (43,922), and cotton manufacturer (33,228). The most common jobs for girls under 15 were domestic servant (58,933), cotton manufacturer (37,058), and indoor farm servant (12,809).

== Orphans ==
Orphans were frequent victims of exploitation. Factory owners could justify not paying orphans because they provided them with clothing, food, and shelter, even though these things were likely to be substandard. Orphans, and poor children, worked as chimney sweeps. An orphan also might be trained to be a shoe black by a charitable organization.

== Child labour laws ==
- The Health and Morals of Apprentices Act 1802 stipulated that child apprentices should not work more than 12 hours a day, must be given a basic education, and must attend church services twice a month. The law was ineffective because it failed to provide for enforcement.
- The Cotton Mills and Factories Act 1819 limited work to children 9 years old or older, and children could not work more than 12 hours a day if they were not 16 years old or older. It also set possible working hours as between 6 am and 9 pm.
- The 1833 Factory Act stipulated that no child under the age of 9 could be legally employed, children 9 to 13 years old could not work more than 8 hours, and children 14 to 18 could not work more than 12 hours a day, children could not work at night, children needed to attend a minimum of 2 hours of education a day, and employers needed age certificates for their workers. It also appointed four factory inspectors to enforce the law. A report by the factory inspectors in 1835 stated that child labour in child factory in textile factories had decreased by 50%.
- Multiple chimney sweepers acts were passed in an attempt to protect child workers. The Chimney Sweepers Act 1788 set a minimum age limit of 8 and required weekly baths for children. The Chimney Sweepers Act 1834 limited the minimum age of chimney sweeps to 14 and mandated a limit on the number of apprentices a master chimney sweep could have. The Chimney Sweepers and Chimneys Regulation Act 1840 then set a minimum age limit of 16 on chimney sweep apprentices. Others included the Chimney Sweepers Regulation Act 1864 and Chimney Sweepers Act 1875.
- The Mines and Collieries Act 1842 stipulated that no child under 10 years old could be employed in any underground work.

== See also ==
- Economy, industry, and trade of the Victorian era
- Life in Great Britain during the Industrial Revolution
