= Chimney Sweepers Act 1875 =

Act of the Parliament of the United Kingdom

Chimney Sweepers Act 1875 (Note: Section 1.)
- Act of Parliament
- Parliament of the United Kingdom
- Long title: An Act for further amending the Law relating to Chimney Sweepers.
- Citation: 38 & 39 Vict. c. 70
- Territorial extent: England and Wales; Ireland; (Note: Section 3.)

Dates
- Royal assent: 11 August 1875
- Commencement: 31 December 1875 (Note: Section 2.)
- Repealed: England and Wales: 29 July 1938; Northern Ireland: 27 July 1971
Other legislation
Repealed by	England and Wales: Chimney Sweepers Acts (Repeal) Act 1938; Northern Ireland: Statute Law (Repeals) Act 1971
Relates to	Chimney Sweepers and Chimneys Regulation Act 1840

Status: Repealed

Text of statute as originally enacted

The Chimney Sweepers Act 1875 (38 & 39 Vict. c. 70) was an act of the Parliament of the United Kingdom that superseded the Chimney Sweepers and Chimneys Regulation Act 1840 (3 & 4 Vict. c. 85) passed to try to stop child labour. The bills, proposed by Lord Shaftesbury, were triggered by the death of eleven-year-old George Brewster, whose master had caused him to climb and clean the chimney at Fulbourn Hospital.

The 1840 act prohibited any person under 21 being compelled or knowingly allowed to ascend or descend a chimney or flue for sweeping, cleaning or coring. This Act ensured all chimney-sweeps would be registered with the police, and that official supervision of their work would take place. The provisions of all previous acts would now take place.

== Subsequent developments ==
The whole act was repealed for England and Wales by section 1(1) of the Chimney Sweepers Acts (Repeal) Act 1938 (1 & 2 Geo. 6. c. 58), which came into force on 29 July 1938.

The whole act was repealed for Northern Ireland by section 1 of, and the part IX of the schedule to, the Statute Law (Repeals) Act 1971, which came into force on 27 July 1971.

== See also ==
- Child labour in the British Industrial Revolution
- Chimney Sweepers Act 1788
- Chimney Sweepers Act 1834
- Chimney Sweepers Regulation Act 1864
- Chimney sweeps' carcinoma
- Percivall Pott

== Bibliography ==
- Strange, K.H. (1982). Climbing Boys: A Study of Sweeps' Apprentices 1772-1875 (PDF). London/Busby: Allison & Busby. ISBN 0-85031-431-3. Archived from the original (PDF) on 24 June 2010.
