= Work (human activity) =

Activities performed to support one's needs

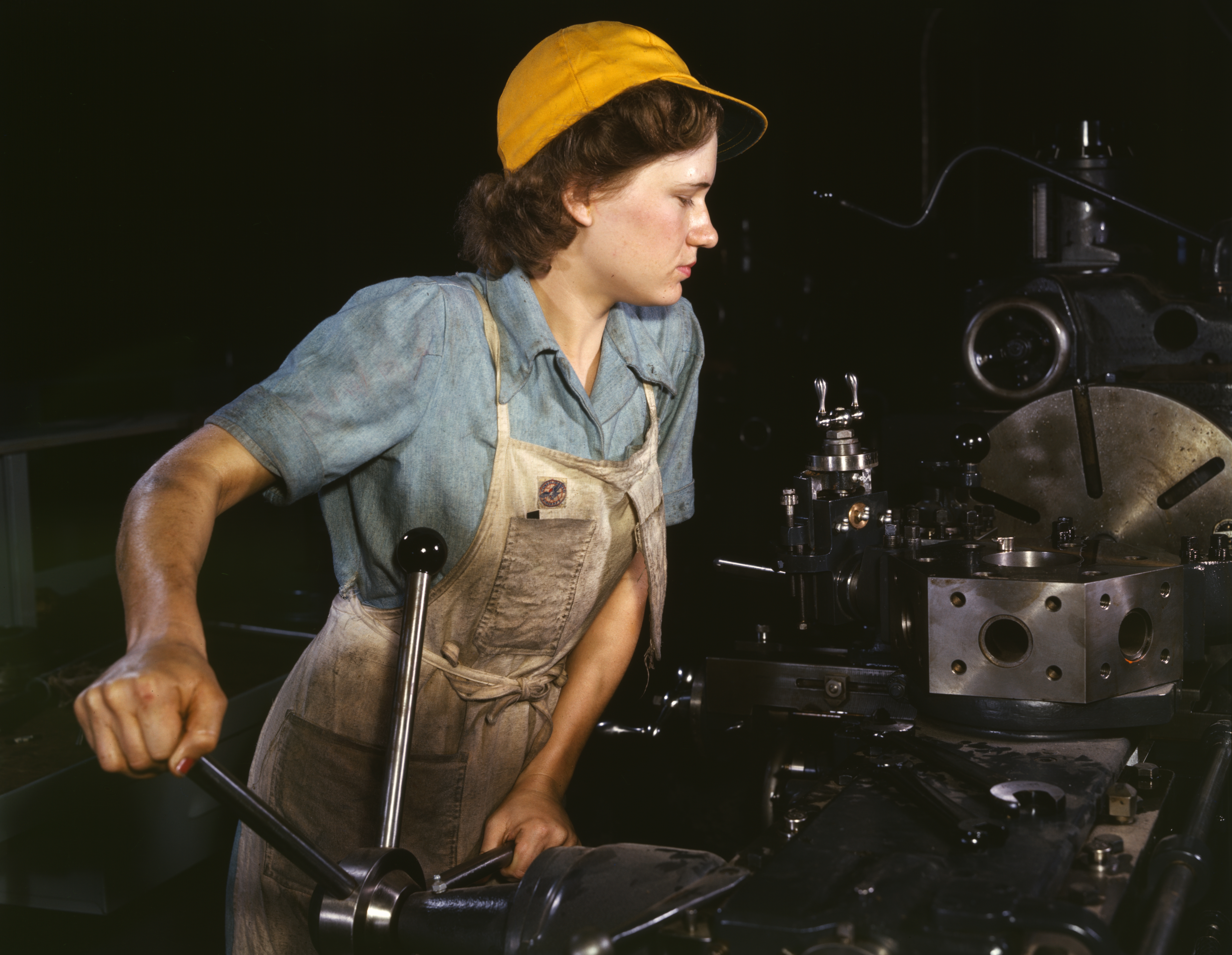
An aircraft worker in Texas during World War II, 1942.

Work or labor (labour in British English) refers to the intentional activities individuals engage in to meet their own needs and potentially wants, as well as those of others or organizations. In economics, work is understood as human labor that, alongside other factors of production, contributes to the creation of goods and services within an economy. Work or labor is a service in standard economic theory.

Work has existed in all human societies, whether as paid or unpaid work, from gathering natural resources by hand in hunter-gatherer groups to operating complex technologies that substitute for physical or even mental effort within an agricultural, industrial, or post-industrial society. One's regular participation or role in work is an occupation, or job. All but the simplest tasks in any work require specific skills, tools, and other resources, such as material for manufacturing goods. Humanity has developed a variety of institutions for group coordination of work, such as government programs, nonprofit organizations, cooperatives, and corporations.

Cultures and individuals across history have expressed a wide range of attitudes towards work. Besides objective differences, one culture may organize or attach social status to work roles through formalized professions which may carry specialized job titles and provide people with a career. Throughout history, work has been intimately connected with other aspects of society and politics, such as power, class, tradition, rights, and privileges. Accordingly, the division of labour is a prominent topic across the social sciences as both an abstract concept and a characteristic of individual cultures. Work may also present a threat to individual human happiness and survival, either through dirty, dangerous, and demeaning occupations or in extreme cases, from death by overwork.

Some people have also engaged in critique of work and expressed a wish to reduce or abolish it entirely, for example in Paul Lafargue in his book The Right to Be Lazy, David Graeber's Bullshit Jobs, or The Abolition of Work by Bob Black. Real world programs to eliminate the economic necessity for lifelong work first emerged through the concept of retirement, and have more recently been extended to all adults through experimentation with universal basic income.

== Description ==
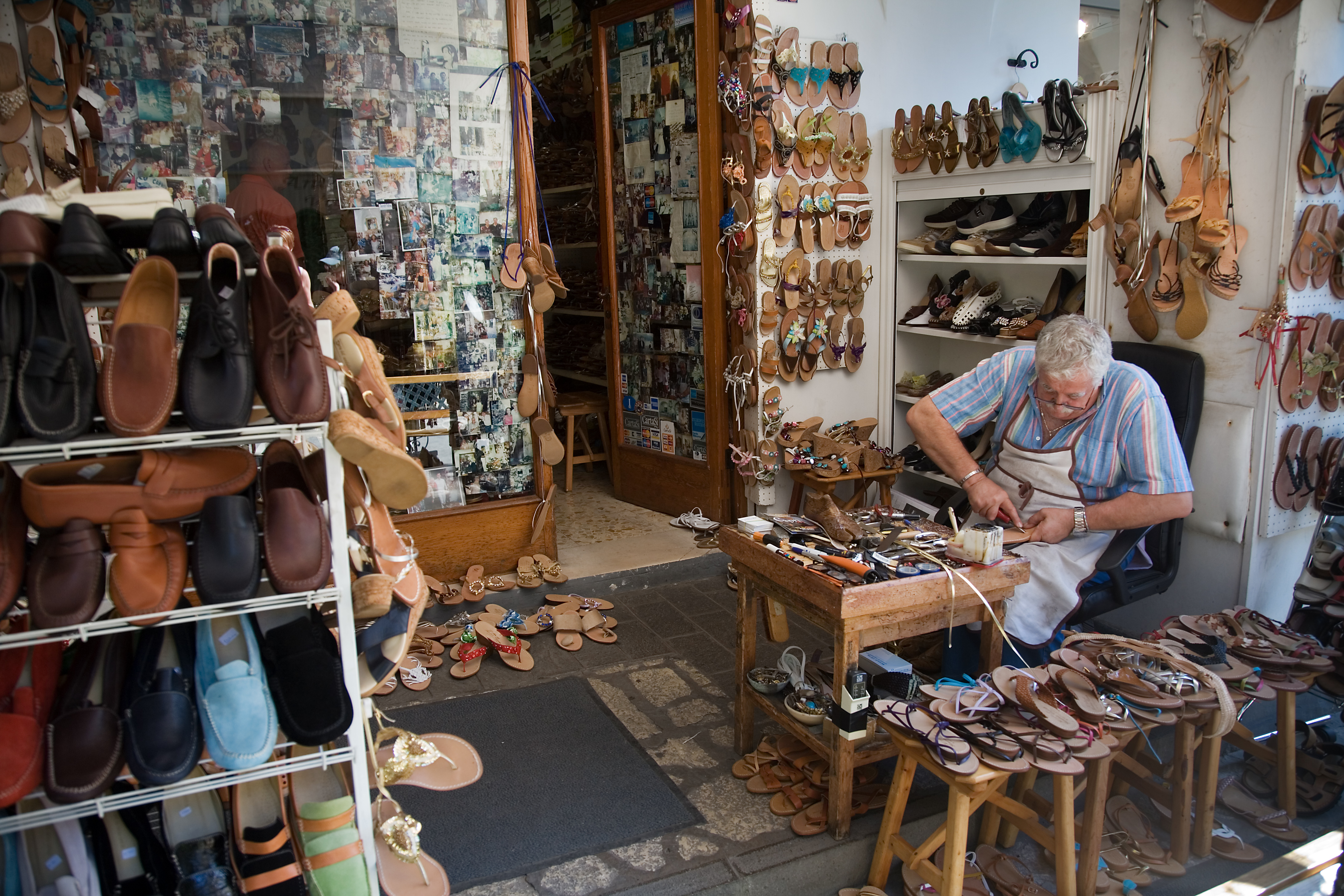
A cordwainer making shoes, Capri, Italy

Work can take many different forms, as varied as the environments, tools, skills, goals, and institutions around a worker. This term refers to the general activity of performing tasks, whether they are paid or unpaid, formal or informal. Work encompasses all types of productive activities, including employment, household chores, volunteering, and creative pursuits. It is a broad term that encompasses any effort or activity directed towards achieving a particular goal.

Because sustained effort is a necessary part of many human activities, what qualifies as work is often a matter of context. Specialization is one common feature that distinguishes work from other activities. For example, a sport is a job for a professional athlete who earns their livelihood from it, but a hobby for someone playing for fun in their community. An element of advance planning or expectation is also common, such as when a paramedic provides medical care while on duty and fully equipped rather than performing first aid off-duty as a bystander in an emergency. Self-care and basic habits like personal grooming are also not typically considered work.

While a later gift, trade, or payment may retroactively affirm an activity as productive, this can exclude work like volunteering or activities within a family setting, like parenting or housekeeping. In some cases, the distinction between work and other activities is simply a matter of common sense within a community. However, an alternative view is that labeling any activity as work is somewhat subjective, as Mark Twain expressed in the "whitewashed fence" scene of The Adventures of Tom Sawyer.

== History ==
Bal maidens with traditional tools and protective clothing spalling ore, 1858

Humans have varied their work habits and attitudes over time. As humans are diurnal, they work mainly during the day, but some occupations require night shift work. Hunter-gatherer societies vary their "work" intensity according to the seasonal availability of plants and the periodic migration of prey animals. The development of agriculture led to more sustained work practices, but work still changed with the seasons, with intense sustained effort during harvests (for example) alternating with less focused periods such as winters. In the early modern era, Protestantism and proto-capitalism emphasized the moral and personal advantages of hard work.

The periodic re-invention of slavery encouraged more consistent work activity in the working class, and capitalist industrialization intensified demands on workers to keep up with the pace of machines. Restrictions on the hours of work and the ages of workers followed, accompanied by rising worker demands for time off, but modern office work retains traces of expectations of sustained, concentrated work, even in affluent societies.

Forms of work take on changes over time in response to technological and societal changes. According to a 2024 study, the majority of current employment in the United States was in occupations that had been introduced since 1940.

== Kinds of work ==
There are several ways to categorize and compare different kinds of work. In economics, one popular approach is the three-sector model or variations of it. In this view, an economy can be separated into three broad categories:

- Primary sector, which extracts food, raw materials, and other resources from the environment
- Secondary sector, which manufactures physical products, refines materials, and provides utilities
- Tertiary sector, which provides services and helps administer the economy

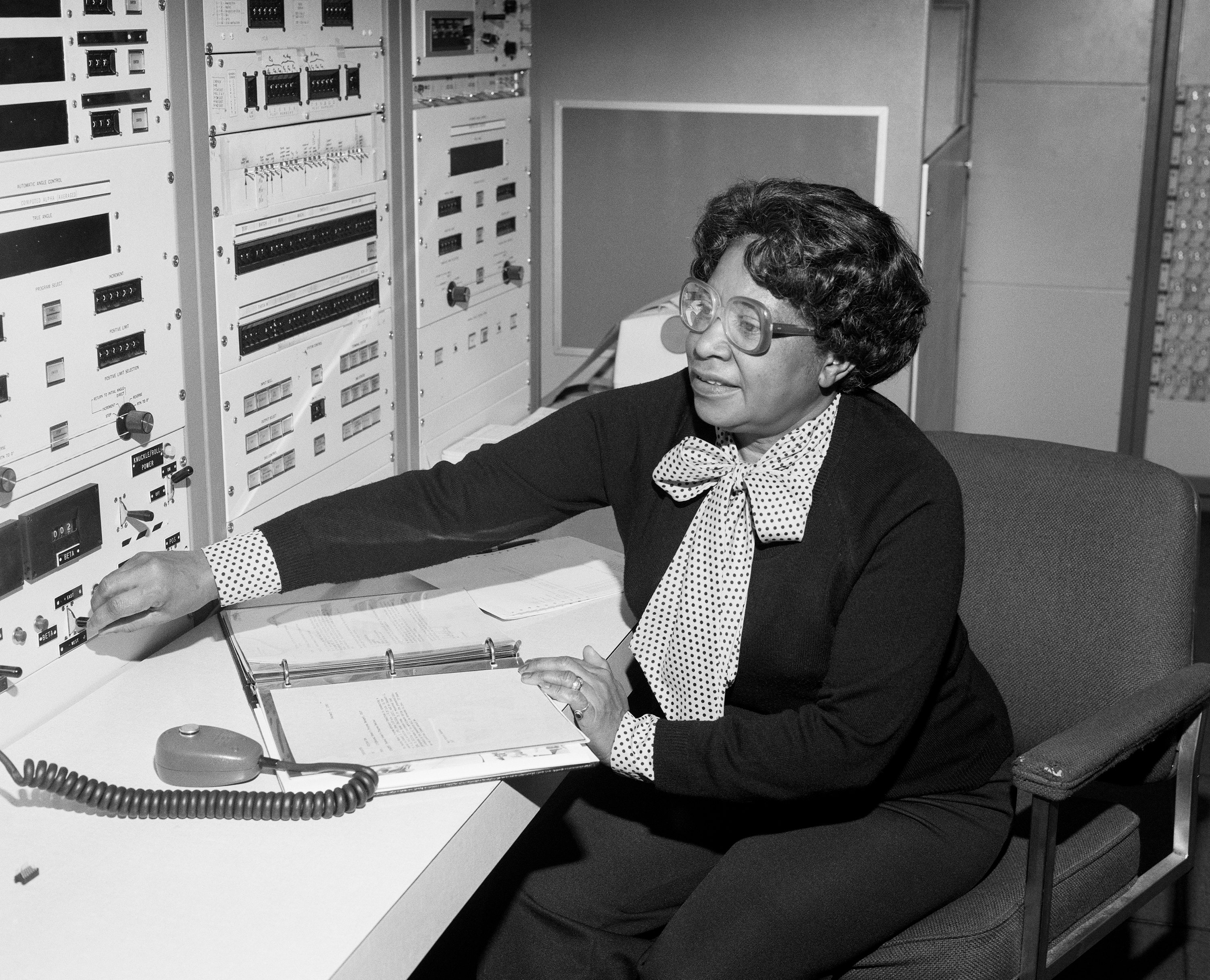
Engineer Mary Jackson working at NASA Langley, 1980.

In complex economies with high specialization, these categories are further subdivided into industries that produce a focused subset of products or services. Some economists also propose additional sectors such as a "knowledge-based" quaternary sector, but this division is neither standardized nor universally accepted.

Another common way of contrasting work roles is ranking them according to a criterion, such as the amount of skill, experience, or seniority associated with a role. The progression from apprentice through journeyman to master craftsman in the skilled trades is one example with a long history and analogs in many cultures.

Societies also commonly rank different work roles by perceived status, but such ranking is subjective and goes beyond clear progressions within a single industry. Some industries may be seen as more prestigious than others overall, even if they include roles with similar functions. At the same time, a wide swathe of roles across all industries may be afforded more status (e.g. managerial roles) or less (like manual labour) based on characteristics such as a job being high-paid or dirty, dangerous and demeaning.

Other social dynamics, like how labor is compensated, can even exclude meaningful tasks from a society's conception of work. For example, in modern market-economies where wage labour or piece work predominates, unpaid work may be omitted from economic analysis or even cultural ideas of what qualifies as work.

At a political level, different roles can fall under separate institutions where workers have qualitatively different power or rights. At one extreme, the least powerful members of society may be stigmatized (as in untouchability) or even violently forced (via slavery) into performing the least desirable work. At the other extreme, elites may have exclusive access to the most prestigious work, largely symbolic sinecures, or even a "life of leisure".

== Workers ==
Individual workers require sufficient health and resources to succeed in their tasks.

=== Physiology ===
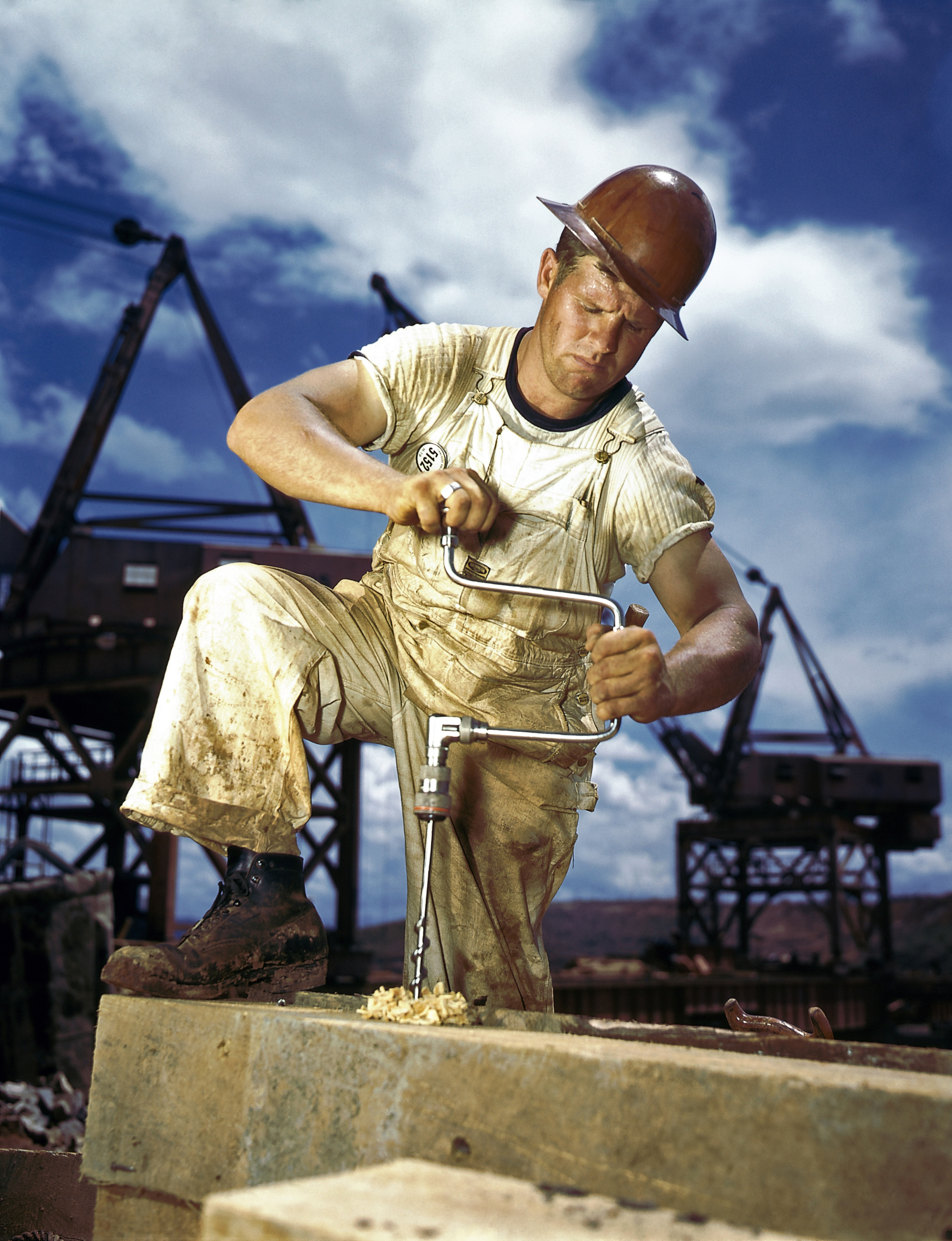
A carpenter at work in 1942.

As living beings, humans require a baseline of good health, nutrition, rest, and other physical needs in order to reliably exert themselves. This is particularly true of physical labour that places direct demands on the body, but even largely mental work can cause stress from problems like long hours, excessive demands, or a hostile workplace.

Particularly intense forms of manual labour often lead workers to develop physical strength necessary for their job. However, this activity does not necessarily improve a worker's overall physical fitness like exercise, due to problems like overwork or a small set of repetitive motions. In these physical jobs, maintaining good posture or movements with proper technique is also a crucial skill for avoiding injury. Ironically, white-collar workers who are sedentary throughout the workday may also suffer from long-term health issues due to a lack of physical activity.

=== Training ===
Learning the necessary skills for work is often a complex process in its own right, requiring intentional training. In traditional societies, know-how for different tasks can be passed to each new generation through oral tradition and working under adult guidance. For work that is more specialized and technically complex, however, a more formal system of education is usually necessary. A complete curriculum ensures that a worker in training has some exposure to all major aspects of their specialty, in both theory and practice.

=== Equipment and technology ===
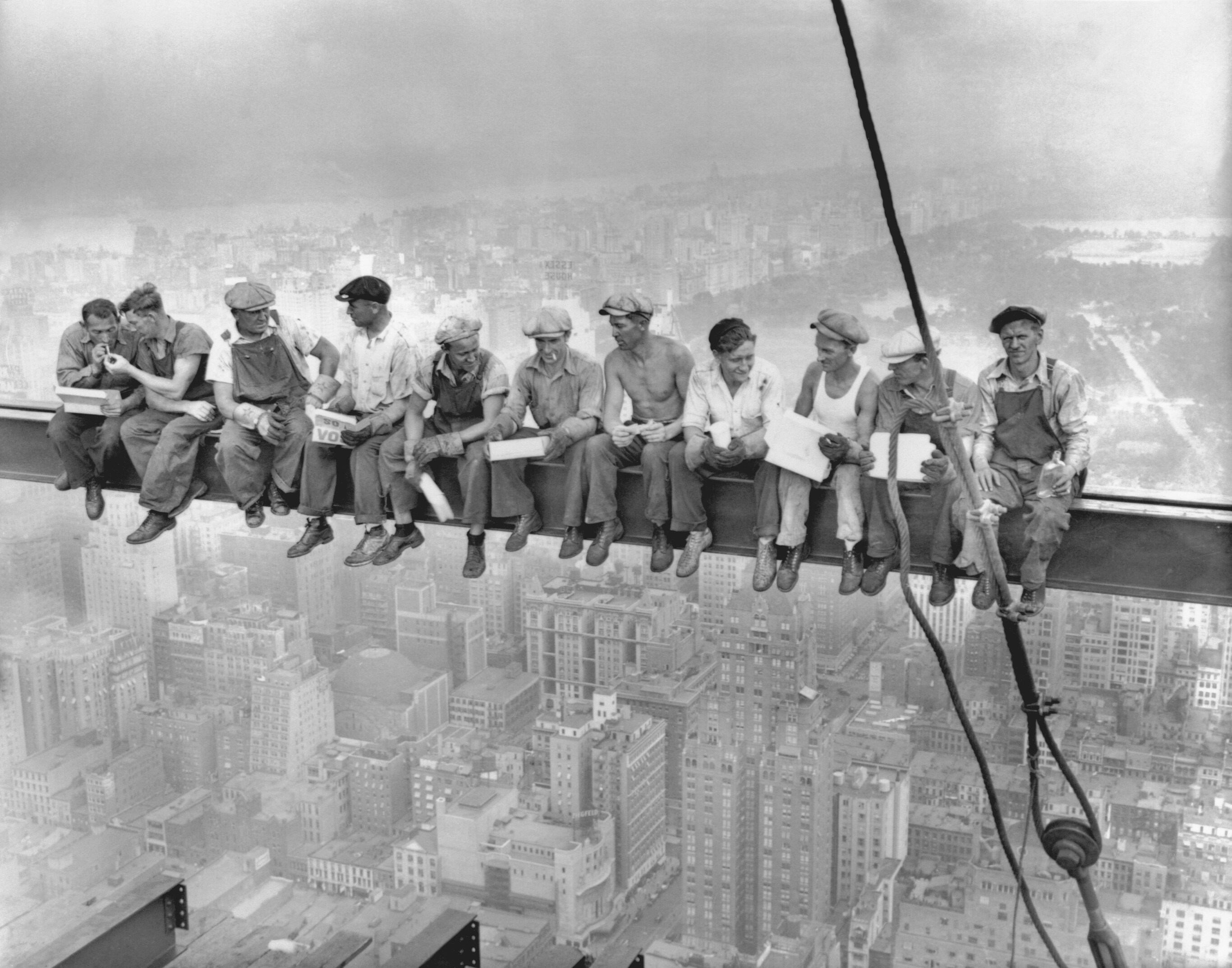
Lunch atop new RCA skyscraper in New York City 1932; photo by Charles Clyde Ebbets

Tool use has been a central aspect of human evolution and is also an essential feature of work. Even in technologically advanced societies, many workers' toolsets still include a number of smaller hand-tools, designed to be held and operated by a single person, often without supplementary power. This is especially true when tasks can be handled by one or a few workers, do not require significant physical power, and are somewhat self-paced, like in many services or handicraft manufacturing.

For other tasks needing large amounts of power, such as in the construction industry, or involving a highly-repetitive set of simple actions, like in mass manufacturing, complex machines can carry out much of the effort. The workers present will focus on more complex tasks, operating controls, or performing maintenance. Over several millennia, invention, scientific discovery, and engineering principles have allowed humans to proceed from creating simple machines that merely redirect or amplify force, through engines for harnessing supplementary power sources, to today's complex, regulated systems that automate many steps within a work process.

In the 20th century, the development of electronics and new mathematical insights led to the creation and widespread adoption of fast, general-purpose computers. Just as mechanization can substitute for the physical labour of many human beings, computers allow for the partial automation of mental work previously carried out by human workers, such as calculations, document transcription, and basic customer service requests. Research and development of related technologies like machine learning and robotics continues into the 21st century.

Beyond tools and machines used to actively perform tasks, workers benefit when other passive elements of their work and environment are designed properly. This includes everything from personal items like workwear and safety gear to features of the workspace itself like furniture, lighting, air quality, and even the underlying architecture.

== In society ==
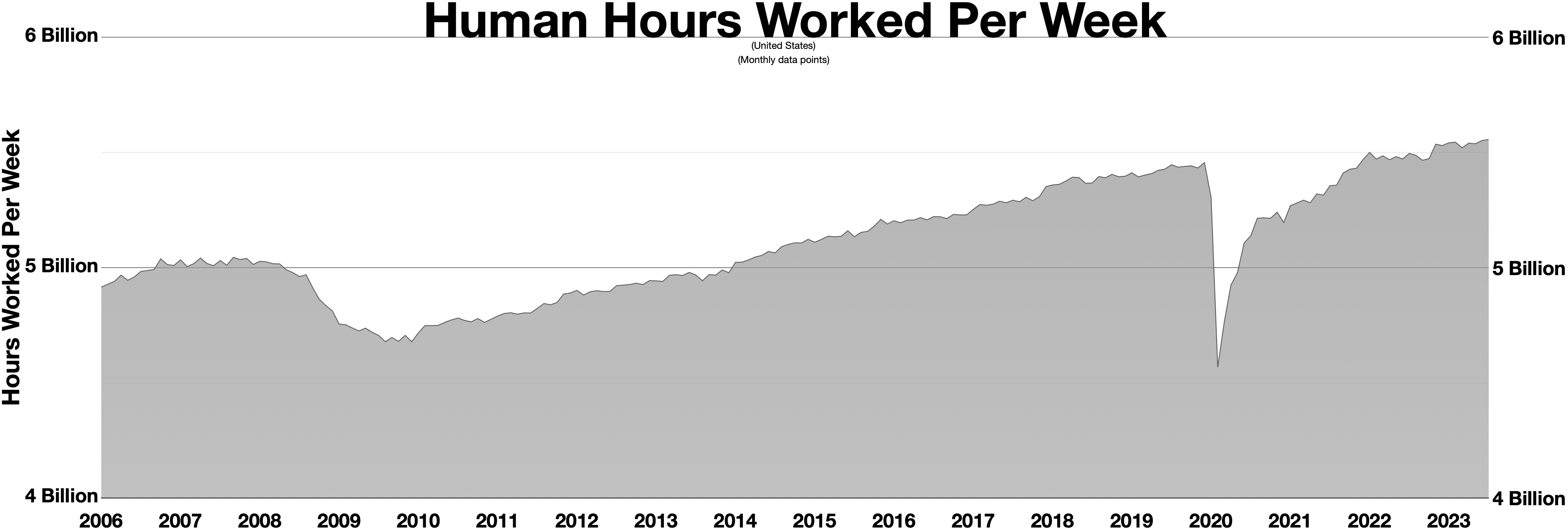
Human-hours worked per week in the US (2006–2023)

=== Organizations ===
Even if workers are personally ready to perform their jobs, coordination is required for any effort outside of individual subsistence to succeed. At the level of a small team working on a single task, only cooperation and good communication may be necessary. As the complexity of a work process increases though, requiring more planning or more workers focused on specific tasks, a reliable organization becomes more critical.

Economic organizations often reflect social thought common to their time and place, such as ideas about human nature or hierarchy. These unique organizations can also be historically significant, even forming major pillars of an economic system. In European history, for instance, the decline of guilds and rise of joint-stock companies goes hand-in-hand with other changes, like the growth of centralized states and capitalism.

In industrialized economies, labour unions are another significant organization. In isolation, a worker that is easily replaceable in the labour market has little power to demand better wages or conditions. By banding together and interacting with business owners as a corporate entity, the same workers can claim a larger share of the value created by their labour. While a union does require workers to sacrifice some autonomy in relation to their coworkers, it can grant workers more control over the work process itself in addition to material benefits.

=== Institutions ===
The need for planning and coordination extends beyond individual organizations to society as a whole too. Every successful work project requires effective resource allocation to provide necessities, materials, and investment (such as equipment and facilities). In smaller, traditional societies, these aspects can be mostly regulated through custom, though as societies grow, more extensive methods become necessary.

These complex institutions, however, still have roots in common human activities. Even the free markets of modern capitalist societies rely fundamentally on trade, while command economies, such as in many communist states during the 20th century, rely on a highly bureaucratic and hierarchical form of redistribution.

Other institutions can affect workers even more directly by delimiting practical day-to-day life or basic legal rights. For example, a caste system may restrict families to a narrow range of jobs, inherited from parent to child. In serfdom, a peasant has more rights than a slave but is attached to a specific piece of land and largely under the power of the landholder, even requiring permission to physically travel outside the land-holding. How institutions play out in individual workers' lives can be complex too; in most societies where wage labour predominates, workers possess equal rights by law and mobility in theory. Without social support or other resources, however, the necessity of earning a livelihood may force a worker to cede some rights and freedoms in fact.

=== Values ===
Societies and subcultures may value work in general, or specific kinds of it, differently. When social status or virtue is strongly associated with leisure, then work can become indicative of low social rank and have a lower value. Conversely, a society may hold strongly to a work ethic where work is seen as virtuous. German sociologist Max Weber hypothesized that European capitalism originated in a Protestant work ethic, which emerged with the Reformation. Some Christian theologians appeal to the Old Testament's Book of Genesis in regards to work. According to Genesis 1, humans were created in the image of God, and in Genesis 2, Adam was placed in the Garden of Eden to "work it and keep it". Dorothy L. Sayers has argued that "work is the natural exercise and function of man – the creature who is made in the image of his Creator." Similarly, John Paul II said in Laborem exercens that by his work, man shares in the image of his creator.

Christian theologians see the fall of man as profoundly affecting human work. In Genesis 3:17, God said to Adam, "cursed is the ground because of you; in pain you shall eat of it all the days of your life". Leland Ryken said that, because of the fall, "many of the tasks we perform in a fallen world are inherently distasteful and wearisome." Christian theologians interpret that through the fall, work has become toil, but John Paul II says work is good for man in spite of this toil, and that "perhaps, in a sense, because of it", because work is something that corresponds to man's dignity and through it, he achieves fulfilment as a human being. Drawing on Aristotle, Ryken suggests that the moral ideal is the golden mean between the two extremes of being lazy and a workaholic. Some Christian theologians also draw on the doctrine of redemption to discuss the concept of work. Oliver O'Donovan said that although work is a gift of creation, it is "ennobled into mutual service in the fellowship of Christ." Pope Francis was critical of the hope that technological progress might diminish the need for work: "the goal should not be that technological progress increasingly replace human work, for this would be detrimental to humanity", and McKinsey suggests work will change, but not end, as a result of automation and the adoption of artificial intelligence.

For some, work may hold a spiritual value in addition to secular notions. Especially in some monastic or mystical strands of several religions, simple manual labour may be held in high regard as a way to maintain the body, cultivate self-discipline and humility, and focus the mind.

=== Current issues ===
The contemporary world economy has brought many changes, overturning some previously widespread labour issues. At the same time, some longstanding issues remain relevant, and other new ones have emerged. One issue that continues despite many improvements is slave labour and human trafficking. Though ideas about universal rights and the economic benefits of free labour have significantly diminished the prevalence of outright slavery, it continues in lawless areas, or in attenuated forms on the margins of many economies.

Another difficulty, which has emerged in most societies as a result of urbanization and industrialization, is unemployment. While the shift from a subsistence economy usually increases the overall productivity of society and lifts many out of poverty, it removes a baseline of material security from those who cannot find employment or other support. Governments have tried a range of strategies to mitigate the problem, such as improving the efficiency of job matching, conditionally providing welfare benefits or unemployment insurance, or even directly overriding the labour market through work-relief programs or a job guarantee. Since a job forms a major part of many workers' self-identity, unemployment can have severe psychological and social consequences beyond the financial insecurity it causes.

One more issue, which may not directly interfere with the functioning of an economy but can have significant indirect effects, is when governments fail to account for work occurring out-of-view from the public sphere. This may be important, uncompensated work occurring every day in private life; or it may be criminal activity that involves clear but furtive economic exchanges. By ignoring or failing to understand these activities, economic policies can have counter-intuitive effects and cause strains on the community and society.

==== Child labour ====
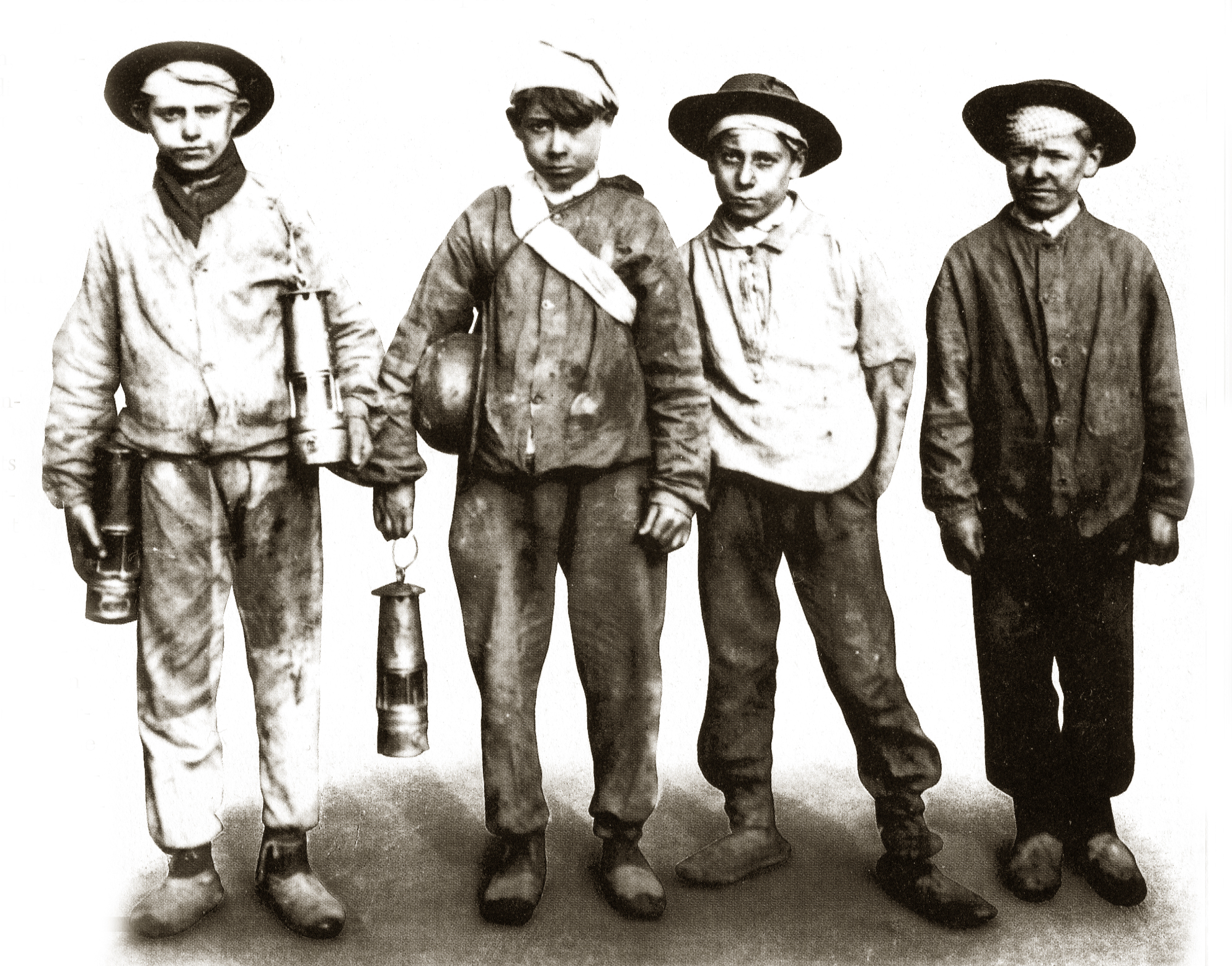
Child coal miners in Prussia, late 19th century

Due to various reasons such as the cheap labour, the poor economic situation of the deprived classes, the weakness of laws and legal supervision, the migration existence of child labour is very much observed in different parts of the world.

According to the World Bank, globally the rate of child labour has decreased from 25% to 10% between the 1960s to the early years of the 21st century. Nevertheless, given that the population of the world also increased, the total number of child labourers remains high, with UNICEF and ILO noting that an estimated 168 million children aged 5–17 worldwide were involved in some sort of child labour in 2013.

Some scholars like Jean-Marie Baland and James A. Robinson suggests any labour by children aged 18 years or less is wrong since this encourages illiteracy, inhumane work and lower investment in human capital. In other words, there are moral and economic reasons that justify a blanket ban on labour from children aged 18 years or less, everywhere in the world. On the other hand, some scholars like Christiaan Grootaert and Kameel Ahmady believe that child labour is the symptom of poverty. If laws ban most lawful work that enables the poor to survive, the informal economy, illicit operations and underground businesses will thrive.

== Workplace ==
A workplace is a location where someone works, for their employer or themselves; a place of employment. Such a place can range from a home office to a large office building or factory. For industrialized societies, the workplace is one of the most important social spaces other than the home, constituting "a central concept for several entities: the worker and [their] family, the employing organization, the customers of the organization, and the society as a whole". The development of new communication technologies has led to the development of the virtual workplace and remote work.

== See also ==
Historical

- New labor history
- French peasants
- Industrial Revolution
- Trade unions in Germany#History
- Labor unions in Japan#History
- Child labour in the British Industrial Revolution
  - Economy, industry, and trade of the Victorian era in UK
- Labor history of the United States
  - History of poverty in the United States

In modern market-economies

- Job guarantee
- Labour economics
- Trade union
- Volunteering
- Wage slavery
- Workaholic

Labour issues

- Annual leave
- Forced labour
- Informal economy
- Job strain
- Labor rights
- Leave of absence
- Minimum wage
- Occupational safety and health
- Paid time off
- Sick leave
- Unemployment (worklessness)
- Unpaid work
- Working poor
- Workplace safety standards

Related concepts

- Critique of work
- Effects of overtime
- Helping behavior
- Occupational burnout
- Occupational stress
- Post-work society
- Refusal of work
