= Chimney Sweepers Regulation Act 1864 =

Act of the Parliament of the United Kingdom

Chimney Sweepers Regulation Act 1864 (Note: Section 1.)
- Act of Parliament
- Parliament of the United Kingdom
- Long title: An Act to amend and extend the Act for the Regulation of Chimney Sweepers.
- Citation: 27 & 28 Vict. c. 37
- Introduced by: 8th Earl of Shaftesbury (Lords)
- Territorial extent: United Kingdom

Dates
- Royal assent: 30 June 1864
- Commencement: 1 November 1864 (Note: Section 2.)
- Repealed: England and Wales: 29 July 1938; Scotland and Northern Ireland: 27 July 1971
Other legislation
Amends	Chimney Sweepers and Chimneys Regulation Act 1840
Amended by	Statute Law Revision Act 1875
Repealed by	England and Wales: Chimney Sweepers Acts (Repeal) Act 1938; Scotland and Northern Ireland: Statute Law (Repeals) Act 1971

Status: Repealed

Text of statute as originally enacted

The Chimney Sweepers Regulation Act 1864 (27 & 28 Vict. c. 37) was an act of the Parliament of the United Kingdom that amended the Chimney Sweepers and Chimneys Regulation Act 1840 (3 & 4 Vict. c. 85) passed to try to stop child labour. Commissioners appointed in 1862 reported that several thousand children aged between five and fourteen years, including many girls, were working for sweeps. The bill was proposed by Lord Shaftesbury.

The 1840 act prohibited any person under the age of 21 being compelled or knowingly allowed to ascend or descend a chimney or flue for sweeping, cleaning, or coring. This was widely ignored by the master sweeps and the homeowners. The act proposed stiff fines and imprisonment for non-compliant master sweeps. It gave the police power to arrest sweeps thought to be breaking the law, and gave Board of Health inspectors the authority to examine new or remodelled chimneys.

== Subsequent developments ==
The whole act was repealed for England and Wales by section 1(1) of the Chimney Sweepers Acts (Repeal) Act 1938 (1 & 2 Geo. 6. c. 58), which came into force on 29 July 1938.

The whole act was repealed for Scotland and Northern Ireland by section 1 of, and the part IX of the schedule to, the Statute Law (Repeals) Act 1971, which came into force on 27 July 1971.

== See also ==
- Child labour in the British Industrial Revolution
- Chimney Sweepers Act 1788
- Chimney Sweepers Act 1834
- Chimney Sweepers Act 1875
- Chimney sweeps' carcinoma
- Percivall Pott

== Bibliography ==
- Strange, K.H. (1982). Climbing Boys: A Study of Sweeps' Apprentices 1772-1875 (PDF). London/Busby: Allison & Busby. ISBN 0-85031-431-3. Archived from the original (PDF) on 24 June 2010.
