= Chimney Sweepers and Chimneys Regulation Act 1840 =

Act of the Parliament of the United Kingdom

Chimney Sweepers and Chimneys Regulation Act 1840 (Note: The citation of this act by this short title was authorised by section 1 of, and the first schedule to, the Short Titles Act 1896. Due to the repeal of those provisions it is now authorised by section 19(2) of the Interpretation Act 1978. This short title was previously conferred on this act by section 1 of the Chimney Sweepers Regulation Act 1864 (27 & 28 Vict.] c. 37))
- Act of Parliament
- Parliament of the United Kingdom
- Long title: An Act for the Regulation of Chimney Sweepers and Chimneys.
- Citation: 3 & 4 Vict. c. 85
- Territorial extent: United Kingdom

Dates
- Royal assent: 7 August 1840
- Commencement: 7 August 1840 (Note: Section 3.)
- Repealed: England and Wales: 29 July 1938; Scotland and Northern Ireland: 27 July 1971
Other legislation
Amends	Chimney Sweepers Act 1834
Amended by	Chimney Sweepers Regulation Act 1864; Statute Law Revision Act 1874 (No. 2); Summary Jurisdiction Act 1884
Repealed by	England and Wales: Chimney Sweepers Acts (Repeal) Act 1938; Scotland and Northern Ireland: Statute Law (Repeals) Act 1971
Relates to	Chimney Sweepers Act 1875

Status: Repealed

Text of statute as originally enacted

The Chimney Sweepers and Chimneys Regulation Act 1840 (3 & 4 Vict. c. 85) was an act of the Parliament of the United Kingdom passed to try to stop child labour. Many boys as young as six were being used as chimney sweeps. One of many chimney sweeps such as Newport, Isle of Wight's Valentine Grey, a 10-year-old, who was murdered by his master Benjamin Davis because he had failed to clean a chimney properly, forced the passing of the "Climbing Boys Act".

This act prohibited any person under 21 being compelled or knowingly allowed to ascend or descend a chimney or flue for sweeping, cleaning or coring.

== Subsequent developments ==
Section 6 of the act was repealed by section 346(1)(b) of, and the fifth part of the third schedule to, the Public Health Act 1936 (26 Geo. 5 & 1 Edw. 8. c. 49), which came into force on 1 October 1937.

The whole act was repealed for England and Wales by section 1(1) of the Chimney Sweepers Acts (Repeal) Act 1938 (1 & 2 Geo. 6. c. 58), which came into force on 29 July 1938.

The whole act was repealed for Scotland and Northern Ireland by section 1 of, and the part IX of the schedule to, the Statute Law (Repeals) Act 1971, which came into force on 27 July 1971.

== See also ==
- Child labour in the British Industrial Revolution
- Chimney Sweepers Act 1788
- Chimney Sweepers Act 1834
- Chimney Sweepers Regulation Act 1864
- Chimney Sweepers Act 1875
- Chimney sweeps' carcinoma
- Percivall Pott
