= Chimney Sweepers Act 1834 =

Act of the Parliament of the United Kingdom

- Act of Parliament
- Parliament of the United Kingdom
- Long title: An Act for the better Regulation of Chimney Sweepers and their Apprentices, and for the safer Construction of Chimneys and Flues.
- Citation: 4 & 5 Will. 4. c. 35
- Territorial extent: United Kingdom

Dates
- Royal assent: 25 July 1834
- Commencement: 25 July 1834 (Note: Section 1.)
- Expired: 1 January 1840 (Note: Section 26.); 1 July 1842 (Note: The Chimney Sweepers and Chimneys Regulation Act 1840 (3 & 4 Vict. c. 85))
- Repealed: 18 July 1874
Other legislation
Repeals/revokes	Chimney Sweepers Act 1788
Amended by	Chimney Sweepers and Chimneys Regulation Act 1840
Repealed by	Statute Law Revision Act 1874
Relates to	Chimney Sweepers and Chimneys Regulation Act 1840

Status: Repealed

Text of statute as originally enacted

The Chimney Sweepers Act 1834 (4 & 5 Will. 4. c. 35) was an act of the Parliament of the United Kingdom passed to try to stop child labour. Many boys as young as six were being used as chimney sweeps.

The act stated that an apprentice must express himself in front of a magistrate that he was "willing and desirous". Masters must not take on boys under the age of fourteen. An apprentice could not be lent to another master. The master could only have six apprentices. Boys under fourteen who were already apprenticed were required to wear brass cap badges on a leather cap. Apprentices were not allowed to climb flues to extinguish fires. Street cries were regulated.

== Subsequent developments ==
The whole act was repealed by section 1 of, and the schedule to, the Statute Law Revision Act 1874 (37 & 38 Vict. c. 35), which came into force on 16 July 1874.

== See also ==
- Child labour in the British Industrial Revolution
- Chimney Sweepers Act 1788
- Chimney Sweepers and Chimneys Regulation Act 1840
- Chimney Sweepers Regulation Act 1864
- Chimney Sweepers Act 1875
- Chimney sweeps' carcinoma
- Percivall Pott

== Bibliography ==
- Strange, K.H. (1982). Climbing Boys: A Study of Sweeps' Apprentices 1772-1875 (PDF). London/Busby: Allison & Busby. ISBN 0-85031-431-3. Archived from the original (PDF) on 24 June 2010.
