= Last injurious exposure rule =

In law, the last injurious exposure rule is the principle that when an occupational disease was caused by a succession of jobs, or could have been caused by any one of a succession of jobs, the most recent employer with the risk exposure is liable.
