= Life in Great Britain during the Industrial Revolution =

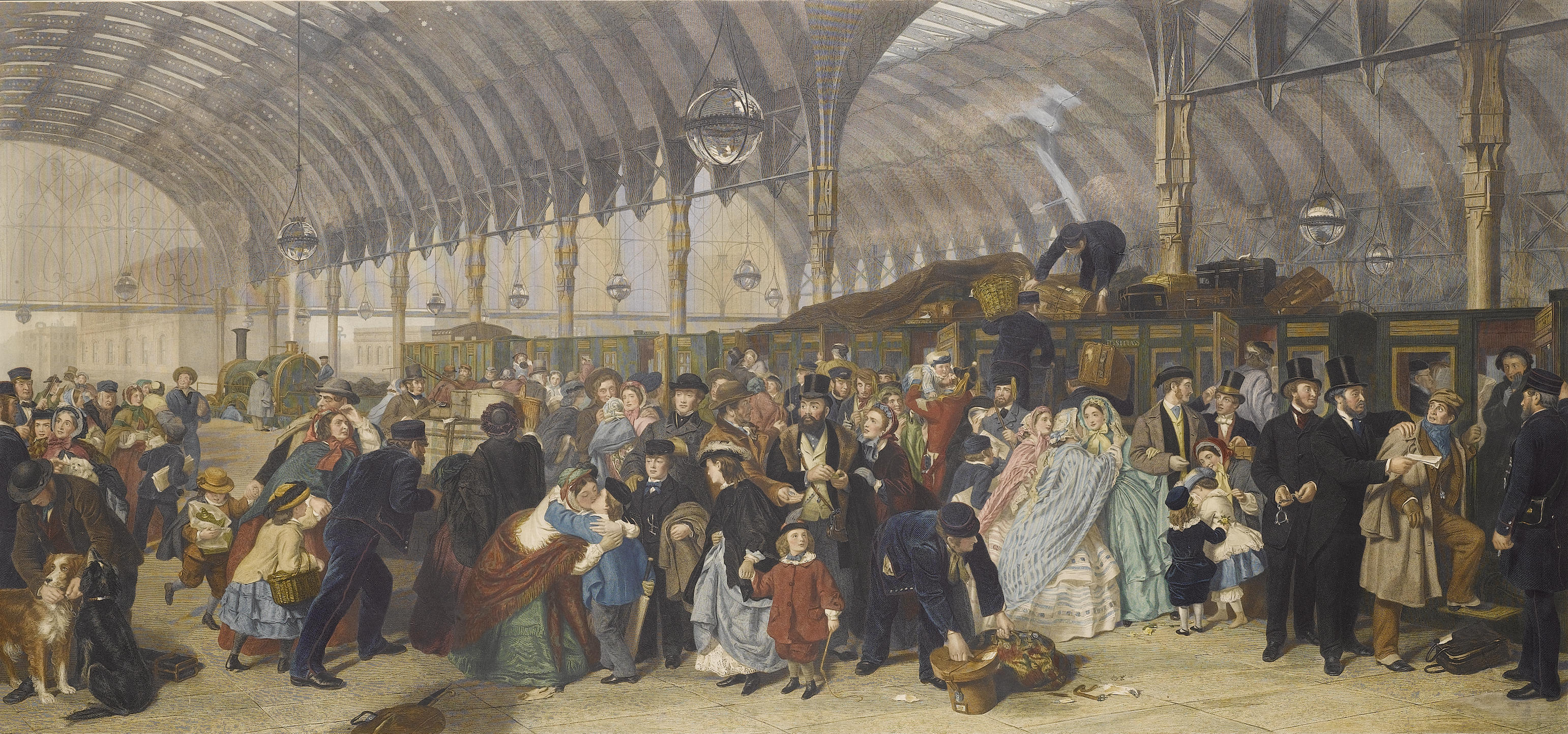
Frith's The Railway Station, 1862 depiction of Paddington railway station in London

Life in Great Britain during the Industrial Revolution shifted from an agrarian-based society to an urban, industrialised society. New social and technological ideas were developed, such as the factory system and the steam engine. Work became more regimented, disciplined, and moved outside the home with large segments of the rural population migrating to the cities.

The industrial belts of Great Britain included the Scottish Lowlands, South Wales, northern England, and the English Midlands. The establishment of major factory centres assisted in the development of canals, roads, and railroads, particularly in Derbyshire, Lancashire, Cheshire, Staffordshire, Nottinghamshire, and Yorkshire. These regions saw the formation of a new workforce, described in Marxist theory as the proletariat.

== Living standards ==
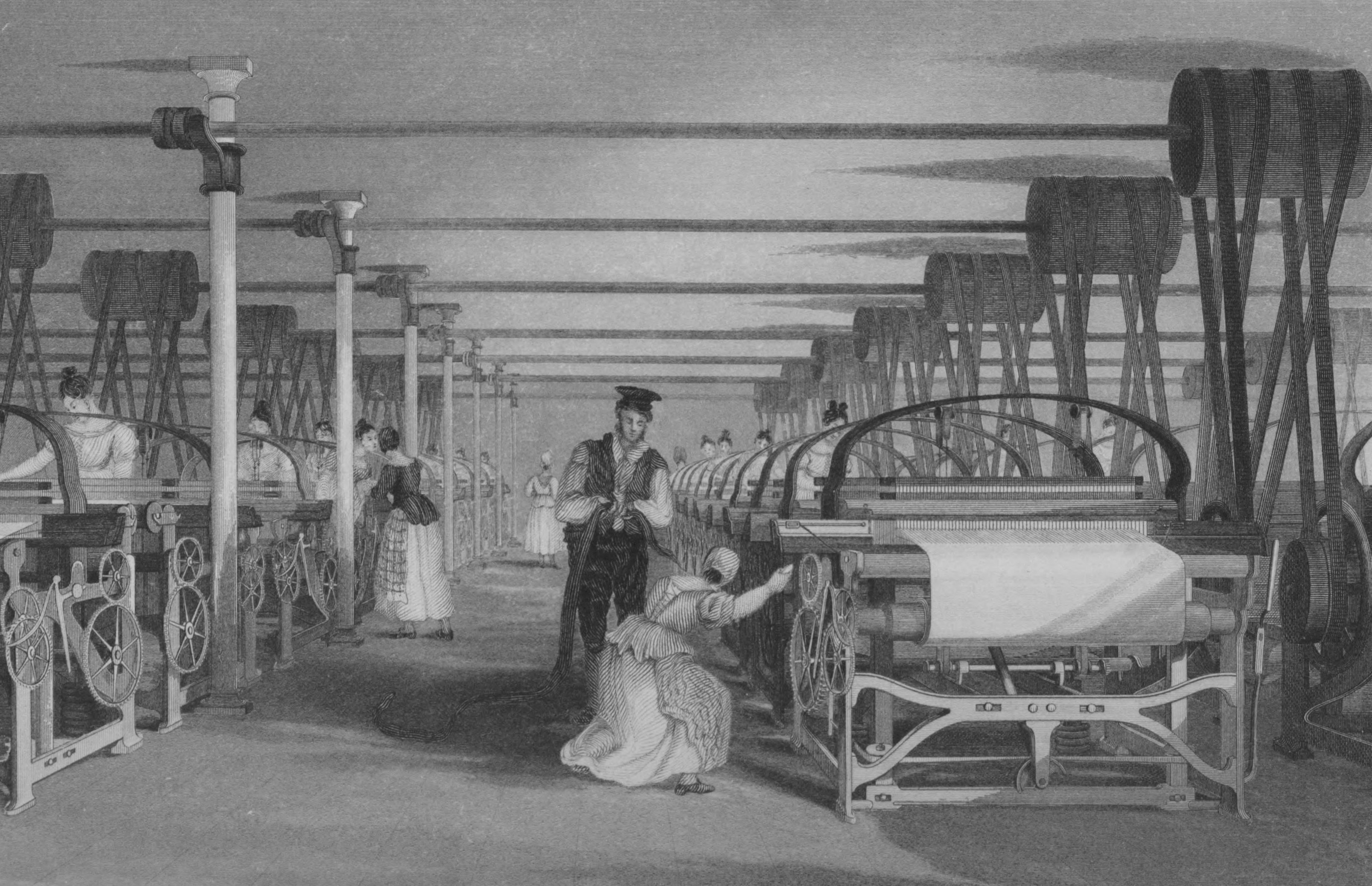
A Roberts loom in a weaving shed in the United Kingdom in 1835

The nature of the Industrial Revolution's impact on living standards in Britain is debated among historians, with Charles Feinstein identifying detrimental impacts on British workers, whilst other historians, including Peter Lindert and Jeffrey Williamson claim the Industrial Revolution improved the living standards of British people. Increasing employment of workers in factories led to a marked decrease in the working conditions of the average worker, as in the absence of labour laws, factories had few safety measures, and accidents resulting in injuries were commonplace. Poor ventilation in workplaces such as cotton mills, coal mines, iron-works and brick factories is thought to have led to development of respiratory diseases among workers.

Housing conditions of working class people who migrated to the cities was often overcrowded and unsanitary, creating a favourable environment for the spread of diseases such as typhoid, cholera and smallpox, further exacerbated by a lack of sick leave. According to one observer, "I am convinced that at no period of English history for which authentic records exist, was the condition of manual labor worse than it was in the forty years from 1782 to 1821, the period in which manufacturers and merchants accumulated fortune rapidly, and in which the rent of agricultural land was doubled."

There was however a rise in real income and increase in availability of various consumer goods to the lower classes during this period. Prior to the industrial revolution, increases in real wages would be offset by subsequent decreases, a phenomenon which ceased to occur following the revolution. The real wage of the average worker doubled in just 32 years from 1819 to 1851. which brought many people out of poverty.

== Child labour ==
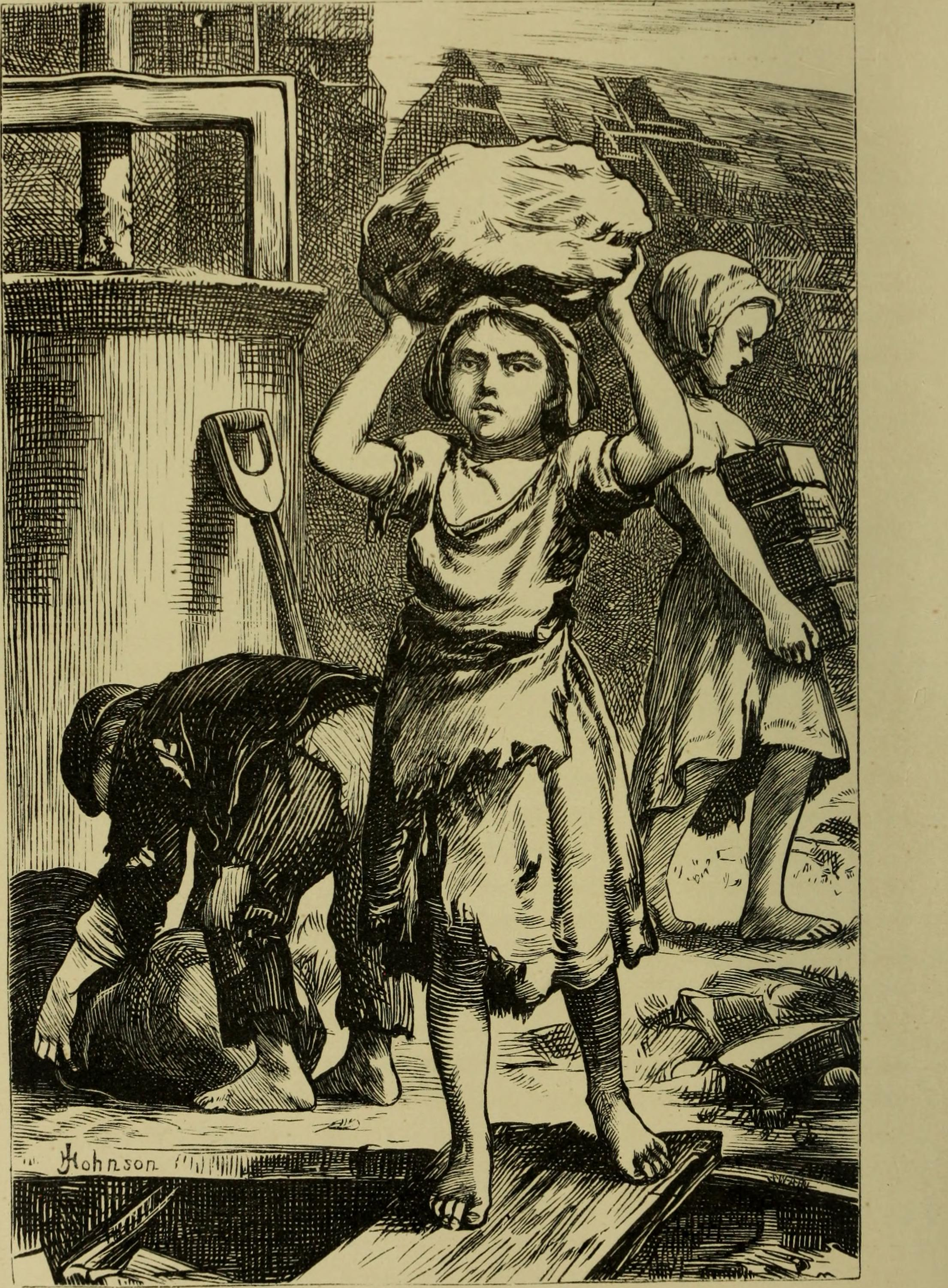
Child labour in England, 1871

In the industrial districts, children tended to enter the workforce at younger ages than rural ones. Children were employed favourably over adults as they were deemed more compliant and therefore easier to deal with. Although most families channeled their children's earnings into providing a better diet for them, working in the factories tended to have an overall negative effect on the health of the children. Child labourers tended to be orphans, children of widows, or from the poorest families.

Children were preferred workers in textile mills as they worked for lower wages and had nimble fingers. Children's work mainly consisted of working under machines as well as cleaning and oiling tight areas. Children were physically punished by their superiors if they did not abide by their superiors expectations of work ethic. The punishments occurred as a result of the drive of master-manufacturers to maintain high output in the factories. The punishments and poor work conditions had a negative effect on the physical health of the children, causing physical deformities and illnesses. Furthermore, childhood diseases from this era have been linked to larger deformities in the future.

Gender was not a discriminator for how children were treated when working during the industrial revolution. Both boys and girls would start working at the age of four or five. A sizeable proportion of children working in the mines were under 13 and a larger proportion were aged 13–18. Mines of the era were not built for stability; rather, they were small and low. Children, therefore, were needed to crawl through them. The conditions in the mines were unsafe, children would often have limbs crippled, their bodies distorted, or be killed. Children could get lost within the mines for days at a time. The air in the mines was harmful to breathe and could cause painful and fatal diseases.

=== Reforms for change ===
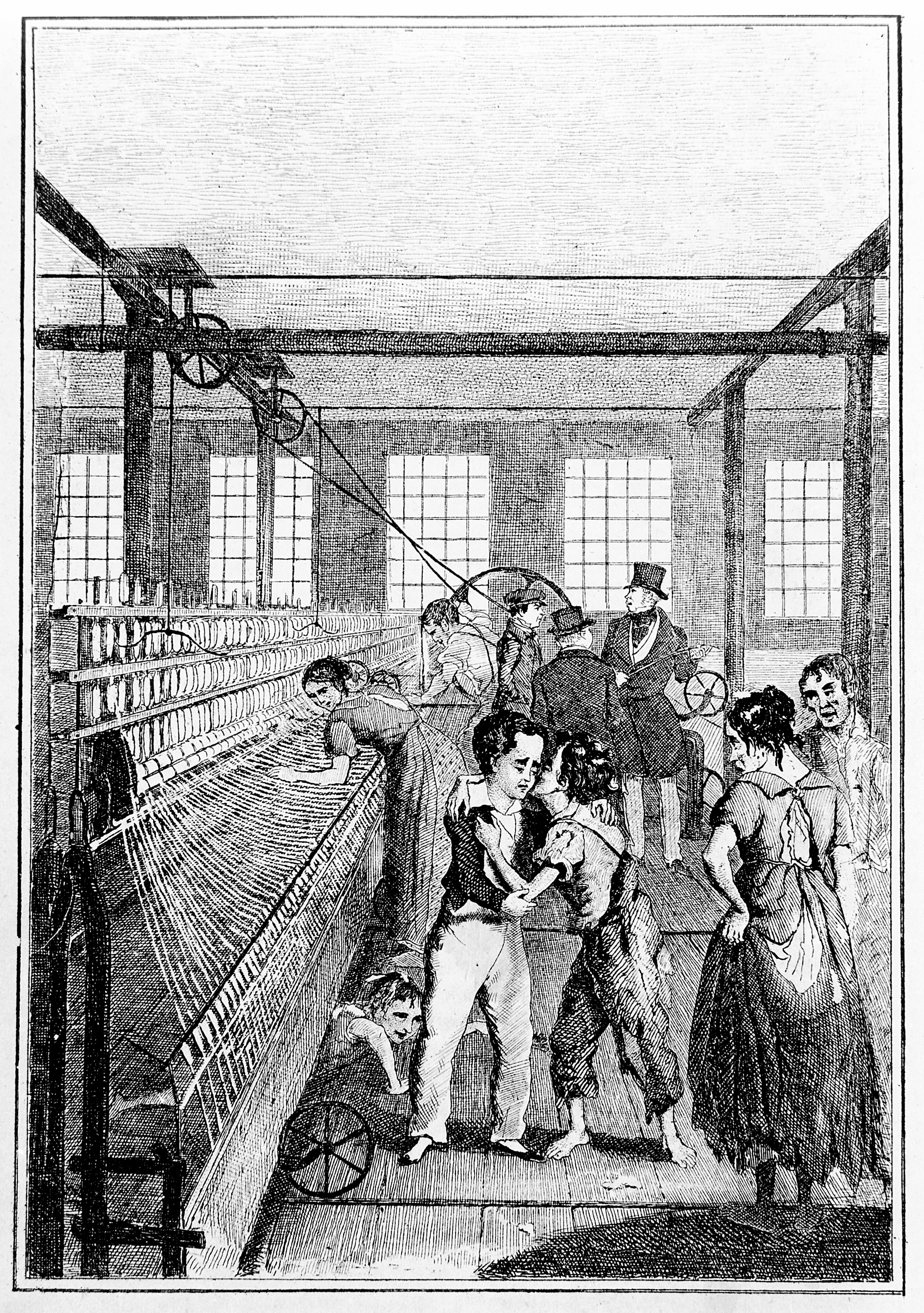
Child apprentices in textile factory

The Health and Morals of Apprentices Act 1802 tried to improve conditions for workers by making factory owners more responsible for the housing and clothing of the workers, but with little success. This act was never put into practice because magistrates failed to enforce it.

The Cotton Mills and Factories Act 1819 forbade the employment of children under the age of nine in cotton mills, and limited the hours of work for children aged 9–16 to twelve hours a day. This act was a major step towards a better life for children since they were less likely to fall asleep during work, resulting in fewer injuries and beatings in the workplace.

Michael Sadler was one of the pioneers in addressing the living and working conditions of industrial workers. In 1832, he led a parliamentary investigation of the conditions of textile workers. The Ashley Commission was another investigation committee, this time studying the situation of mine workers. One finding of the investigation was the observation alongside increased productivity, the number of working hours of the wage workers had also doubled in many cases.

The efforts of Michael Sadler and the Ashley Commission resulted in the passage of the 1833 act which limited the number of working hours for women and children. This bill limited children aged 9–18 to working no more than 48 hours a week, and stipulated that they spend two hours at school during work hours. The Act also created the factory inspector and provided for routine inspections of factories to ensure factories implemented the reforms.

According to one cotton manufacturer:

We have never worked more than seventy-one hours a week before Sir John Hobhouse's Act was passed. We then came down to sixty-nine; and since Lord Althorp's Act was passed, in 1833, we have reduced the time of adults to sixty-seven and a half hours a week, and that of children under thirteen years of age to forty-eight hours in the week, though to do this latter has, I must admit, subjected us to much inconvenience, but the elder hands to more, in as much as the relief given to the child is in some measure imposed on the adult.

The first report for women and children in mines lead to the Mines and Collieries Act 1842, which stated that children under the age of ten could not work in mines and that no women or girls could work in the mines. The second report in 1843 reinforced this act.

The Factories Act 1844 limited women and young adults to working 12-hour days, and children from the ages 9 to 13 could only work nine-hour days. The Act also made mill masters and owners more accountable for injuries to workers. The Factories Act 1847, also known as the ten-hour bill, made it law that women and young people worked not more than ten hours a day and a maximum of 63 hours a week. The last two major factory acts of the Industrial Revolution were introduced in 1850 and 1856. After these acts, factories could no longer dictate working hours for women and children. They were to work from 6 am to 6 pm in the summer, and 7 am to 7 pm in the winter. These acts took a lot of power and authority away from the manufacturers and allowed women and children to have more personal time for the family and for themselves.

The Prevention of Cruelty to, and Protection of, Children Act 1889 aimed to stop the abuse of children in both the work and family sphere of life.

The Elementary Education Act 1870 allowed all children within the United Kingdom to have access to education. Education was not made compulsory until 1880 since many factory owners feared the removal of children as a source of cheap labour. With the basic mathematics and English skills that children were acquiring, however, factory owners had a growing pool of workers who could read.

The Hessian movement was a late 19th-century movement characterized by a desire to return to agrarian roots while embracing industrial efficiency, which Thomas Carlyle notably labelled a "paradox of the highest proportions".

== See also ==
- Child labour in the British Industrial Revolution
- Economy, industry, and trade of the Victorian era
