= Chimney Sweepers Acts (Repeal) Act 1938 =

Act of the Parliament of the United Kingdom

Chimney Sweepers Acts (Repeal) Act 1938 (Note: Section 1(2).)
- Act of Parliament
- Parliament of the United Kingdom
- Long title: An Act to repeal the Chimney Sweepers and Chimneys Regulation Acts, 1840 and 1864, the Chimney Sweepers Act, 1875, and the Chimney Sweepers Act, 1894.
- Citation: 1 & 2 Geo. 6. c. 58
- Territorial extent: England and Wales (Note: Section 1(2).)

Dates
- Royal assent: 29 July 1938
- Commencement: 29 July 1938 (Note: The Acts of Parliament (Commencement) Act 1793.)
- Repealed: 23 May 1950
Other legislation
Amends	See § Repealed enactments
Repeals/revokes	See § Repealed enactments
Repealed by	Statute Law Revision Act 1950

Status: Repealed

Text of statute as originally enacted

The Chimney Sweepers Acts (Repeal) Act 1938 (1 & 2 Geo. 6. c. 58) was an act of the Parliament of the United Kingdom that repealed obsolete enactments related to chimney sweeps in England and Wales.

== Provisions ==
=== Repealed enactments ===
Section 1(1) of the act repealed 4 enactments, listed in that section, as far as they related to England and Wales.

Citation	Short title	Extent of repeal
3 & 4 Vict. c. 85	Chimney Sweepers and Chimneys Regulation Act 1840	The whole act.
27 & 28 Vict. c. 37	Chimney Sweepers Regulation Act 1864	The whole act.
38 & 39 Vict. c. 70	Chimney Sweepers Act 1875	The whole act.
57 & 58 Vict. c. 51	Chimney Sweepers Act 1894	The whole act.

== Subsequent developments ==
The whole act was repealed by section 1 of, and the first schedule to, the Statute Law Revision Act 1950 (14 Geo. 6. c. 6), which came into force on 23 May 1950.

The four repealed acts continued in force in Scotland and Northern Ireland until they were repealed by section 1 of, and part IX of the schedule to, the Statute Law (Repeals) Act 1971, which came into force on 27 July 1971.
