= Chimney Sweepers Act 1788 =

Act of the Parliament of Great Britain

- Act of Parliament
- Parliament of Great Britain
- Long title: An Act for the better Regulation of Chimney Sweepers and their Apprentices.
- Citation: 28 Geo. 3. c. 48
- Territorial extent: Great Britain

Dates
- Royal assent: 25 June 1788
- Commencement: 5 July 1788 (Note: Section 1.)
- Repealed: 21 August 1871

Other legislation
- Amended by: Chimney Sweepers Act 1834
- Repealed by: Statute Law Revision Act 1871

Status: Repealed

Text of statute as originally enacted

The Chimney Sweepers Act 1788 (28 Geo. 3. c. 48) was an act of the Parliament of Great Britain passed to try to stop child labour. Many boys as young as four were being used as chimney sweeps.

This act stated that no boy should be bound apprentice before he was eight years old. His parents' consent must be obtained, the master sweep must promise to provide suitable clothing and living conditions, as well as an opportunity to attend church on Sundays. The clause inserted into the bill requiring master sweeps to be licensed was voted down in the House of Lords.

== Subsequent developments ==
The whole act was repealed by section 1 of, and the schedule to, the Statute Law Revision Act 1871 (34 & 35 Vict. c. 116), which came into force on 21 August 1871.

== See also ==
- Child labour in the British Industrial Revolution
- Chimney Sweepers Act 1834
- Chimney Sweepers and Chimneys Regulation Act 1840
- Chimney Sweepers Regulation Act 1864
- Chimney Sweepers Act 1875
- Chimney sweeps' carcinoma
- Percivall Pott

== Bibliography ==
- Strange, K. H. (1982). Climbing Boys: A Study of Sweeps' Apprentices 1772-1875 (PDF). London/Busby: Allison & Busby. ISBN 0-85031-431-3. Archived from the original (PDF) on 24 June 2010.
