= Kellow Chesney =

Kellow Chesney (3 March 1914 – July 2004) was a journalist, publisher's reader, editor and writer.

His most notable book was The Victorian Underworld, first published in 1970. The writer William Gibson has stated that his depiction of the criminal society in Neuromancer (1984) was strongly influenced by this popular work: "I literally had The Victorian Underworld on my desk constantly, throughout the writing of Neuromancer, and for years after."

== Life ==
He was born in Whimple, Devonshire, the son of Kellow and Vera Moule Chesney. He married Anne M. H. Thackeray, a social worker, on 19 March 1951. They had one daughter, Charlotte Chesney.

He attended Haileybury and Imperial Service College, a boarding school situated between Hertford and Hoddesdon, about 20 miles north of central London. He then studied at Wadham College, Oxford, from 1928 to 1933. He served in the British Army from 1940 to 1946, retiring as a lieutenant. He then entered journalism, eventually becoming a full-time writer.

== Publications ==
- Body on the Bench-(Translator), by Jacques Decrest, Hammond, 1953
- Royal Menus-(Editor & Translator), by Rene Roussin, Hammond, 1960
- Crimean War Reader, Muller, 1960, revised edition, Severn House, 1975
- The Victorian Underworld, M.T. Smith, 1970
