= Economy, industry, and trade of the Victorian era =

Economy, industry, and trade of the Victorian era refers to the economic history of the United Kingdom during the reign of Queen Victoria.

== Progress ==
"The most obvious and the most distinctive feature of the History of Civilisation, during the last fifty years [1837–87], is the wonderful increase of industrial production by the application of machinery, the improvement of old technical processes and the invention of new ones, accompanied by an even more remarkable development of old and new means of locomotion and intercommunication."

— Thomas Henry Huxley

The nineteenth century saw dramatic technological development. Engineering prowess, especially in communication and transportation, made Great Britain the leading industrial powerhouse and trading nation of the world at that time.

According to historians David Brandon and Alan Brooke, the new system of railways after 1830 brought into being our modern world:

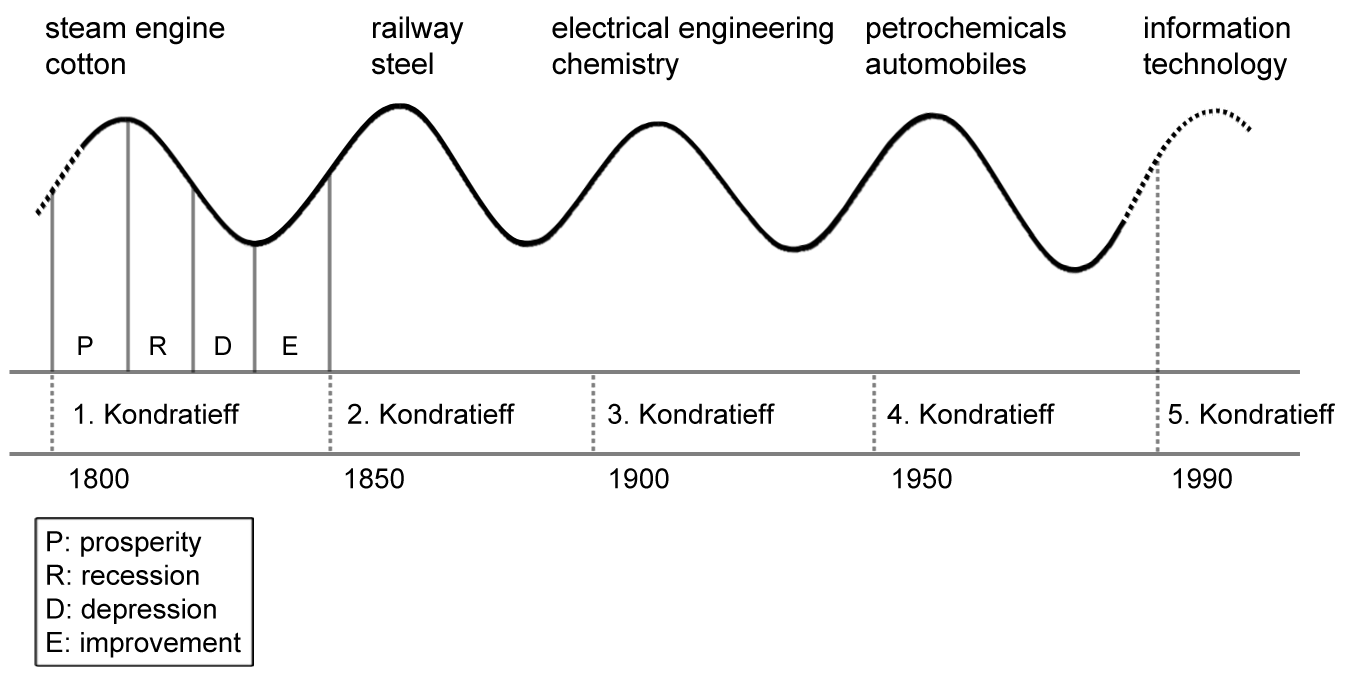
Schematic diagram of the Kondratiev wave

They stimulated demand for building materials, coal, iron and, later, steel. Excelling in the bulk movement of coal, they provided the fuel for the furnaces of industry and for domestic fireplaces. Millions of people were able to travel who had scarcely ever travelled before. Railways enabled mail, newspapers, periodicals and cheap literature to be distributed easily, quickly and cheaply allowing a much wider and faster dissemination of ideas and information. They had a significant impact on improving diet....[and enabled] a proportionately smaller agricultural industry was able to feed a much larger urban population....They employed huge quantities of labour both directly and indirectly. They helped Britain to become the ‘Workshop of the World’ by reducing transport costs not only of raw materials but of finished goods, large amounts of which were exported....[T]oday's global corporations originated with the great limited liability railway companies....By the third quarter of the nineteenth century, there was scarcely any person living in Britain whose life had not been altered in some way by the coming of the railways. Railways contributed to the transformation of Britain from a rural to a predominantly urban society.

Historians have characterised the mid-Victorian era (1850–1870) as Britain's "Golden Years". It was not till the two to three decades following the Second World War that substantial economic growth was seen again. In the long-term view, the mid-Victorian boom was one upswing in the Kondratiev cycle (see figure). There was prosperity, as the national income per person grew by half. Much of the prosperity was due to the increasing industrialisation, especially in textiles and machinery, as well as to the worldwide network of exports that produced profits for British merchants. British entrepreneurs built railways in India and many independent nations. There was peace abroad (apart from the short Crimean War, 1854–56), and social peace at home. Opposition to the new order melted away, says Porter. The Chartist movement peaked as a democratic movement among the working class in 1848; its leaders moved to other pursuits, such as trade unions and cooperative societies. The working class ignored foreign agitators like Karl Marx in their midst, and joined in celebrating the new prosperity. Employers typically were paternalistic and generally recognised the trade unions. Companies provided their employees with welfare services ranging from housing, schools and churches, to libraries, baths, and gymnasia. Middle-class reformers did their best to assist the working classes' aspirations to middle-class norms of "respectability". There was a spirit of libertarianism, says Porter, as people felt they were free. Taxes were very low, and government restrictions were minimal. There were still problem areas, such as occasional riots, especially those motivated by anti-Catholicism. Society was still ruled by the aristocracy and the gentry, who controlled high government offices, both houses of Parliament, the church, and the military. Becoming a rich businessman was not as prestigious as inheriting a title and owning a landed estate. Literature was doing well, but the fine arts languished as the Great Exhibition of 1851 showcased Britain's industrial prowess rather than its sculpture, painting or music. The educational system was mediocre; the main universities (outside Scotland) were likewise mediocre. Historian Llewellyn Woodward has concluded:

For leisure or work, for getting or for spending, England was a better country in 1879 than in 1815. The scales were less weighted against the weak, against women and children, and against the poor. There was greater movement, and less of the fatalism of an earlier age. The public conscience was more instructed, and the content of liberty was being widened to include something more than freedom from political constraint ... Yet England in 1871 was by no means an earthly paradise. The housing and conditions of life of the working class in town & country were still a disgrace to an age of plenty.

In December 1844, Rochdale Society of Equitable Pioneers founded what is considered the first cooperative in the world. The founding members were a group of 28, around half of which were weavers, who decided to band together to open a store owned and managed democratically by the members, selling food items they could not otherwise afford. Ten years later, the British co-operative movement had grown to nearly 1,000 co-operatives. The movement also spread across the world, with the first cooperative financial institution founded in 1850 in Germany.

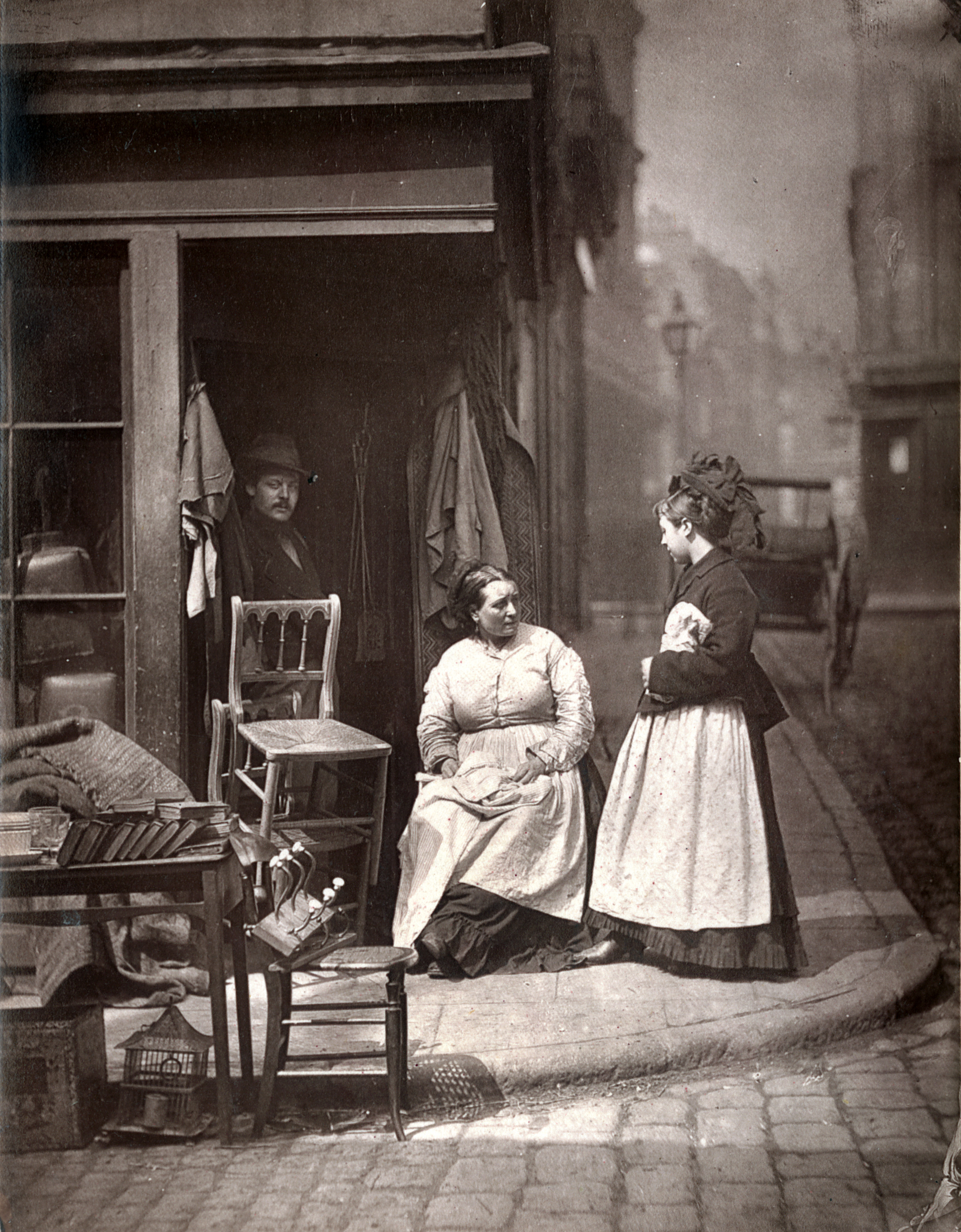
From Street Life in London, 1877, by John Thomson and Adolphe Smith. "...the inhabitants of Church Lane were nearly all what I may term “street folks" – living, buying, selling, transacting all their business in the open street. It was a celebrated resort for tramps and costers of every description."

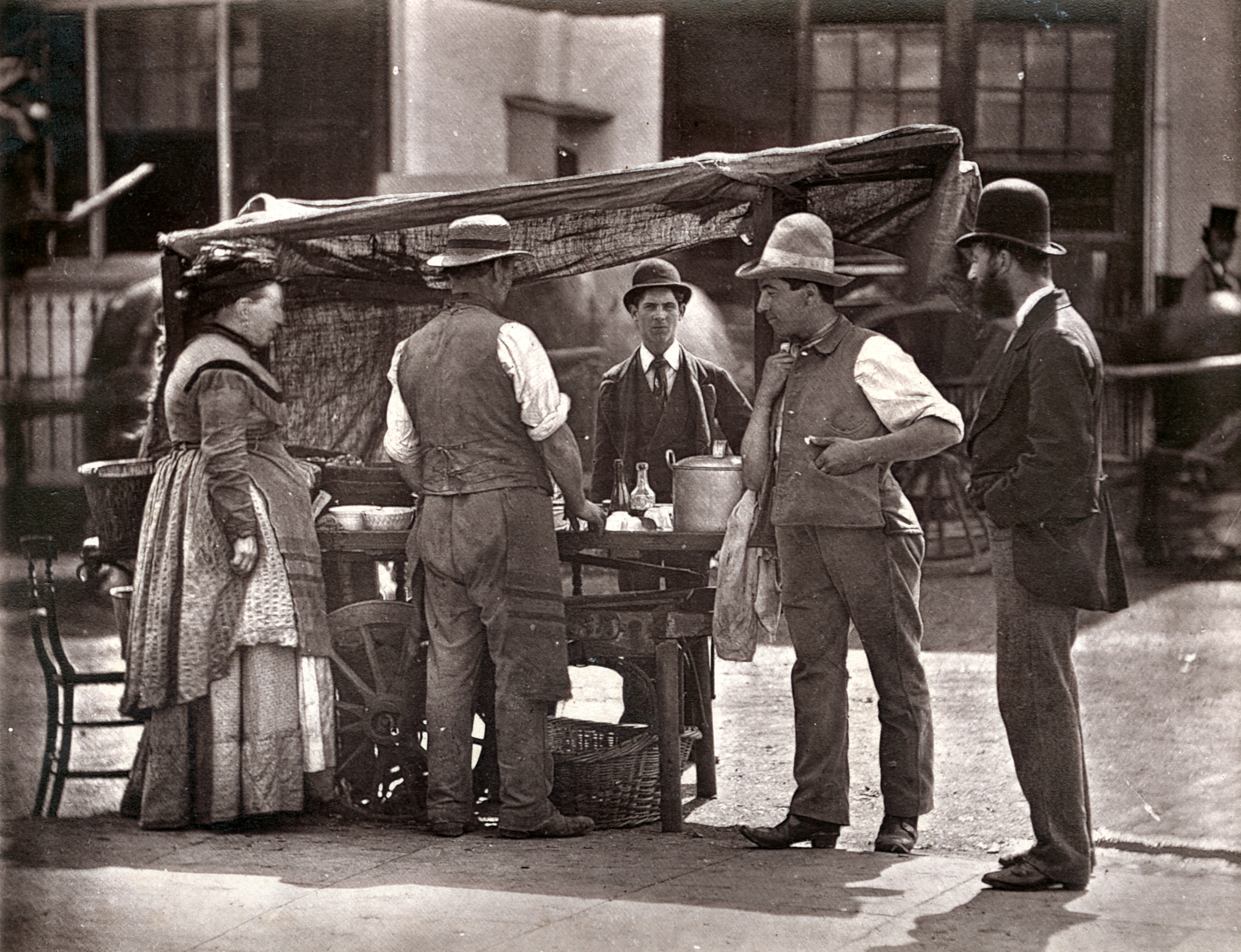
A street stall in London during the 1870s

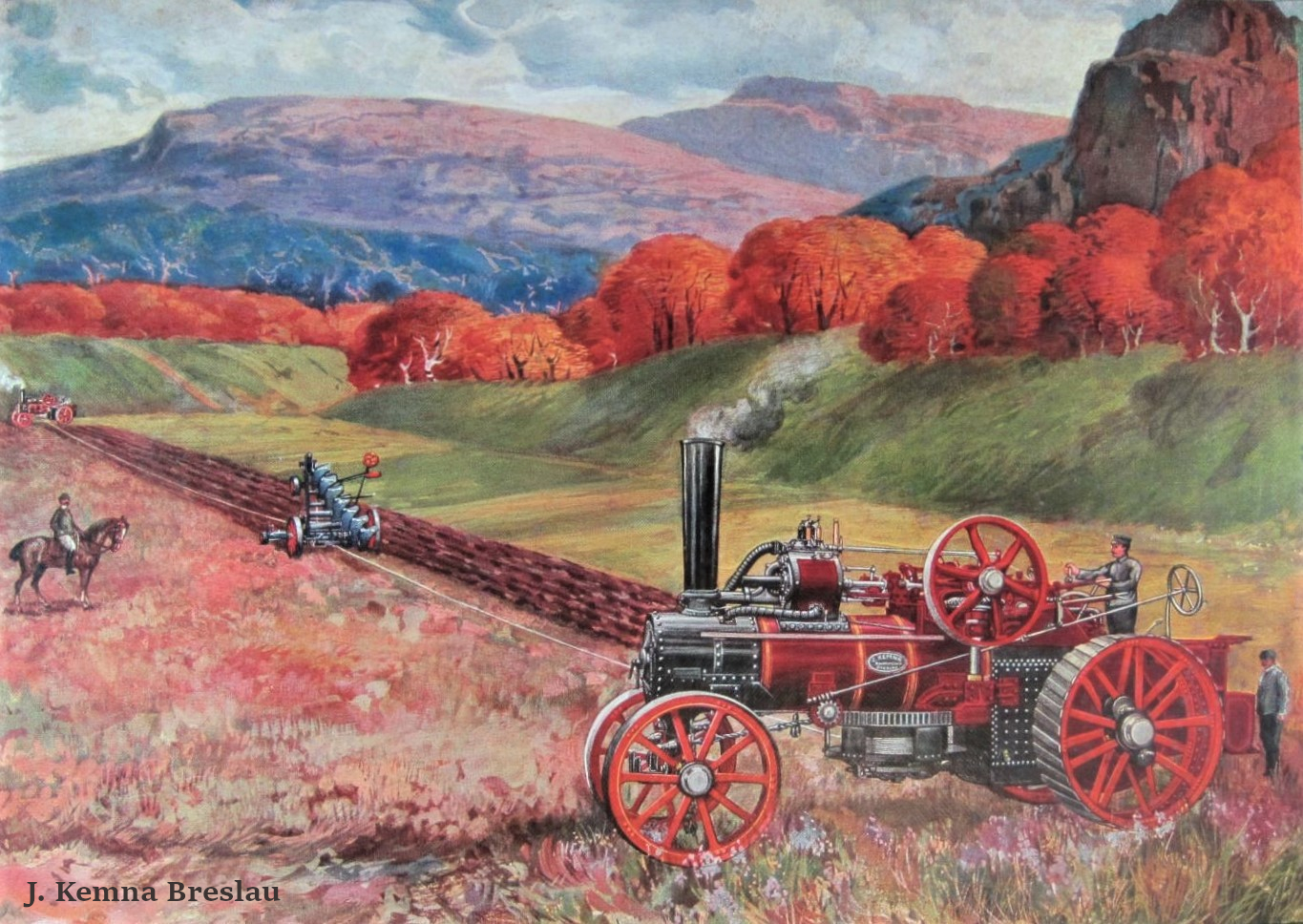
Many European companies, such as steam-machine producer J. Kemna, modeled themselves on English industry.

== Housing ==
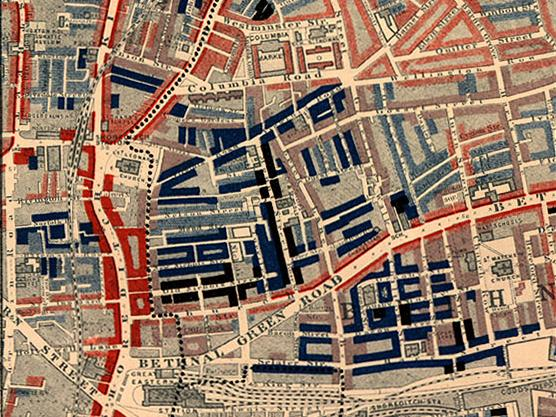
Part of Charles Booth's poverty map showing the Old Nichol, a slum in the East End of London. Published 1889 in Life and Labour of the People in London. The red areas are "middle class, well-to-do", light blue areas are "poor, 18s to 21s a week for a moderate family", dark blue areas are "very poor, casual, chronic want", and black areas are the "lowest class...occasional labourers, street sellers, loafers, criminals and semi-criminals".

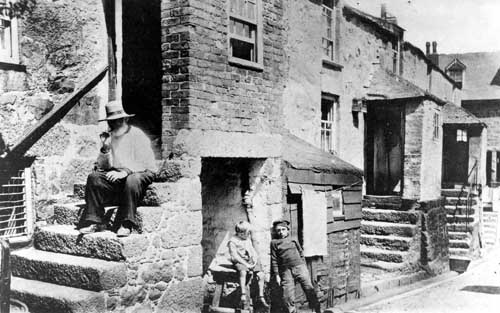
Working class life in Victorian St Ives, Cornwall

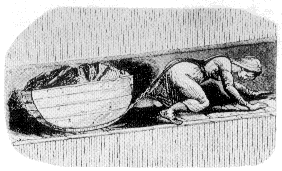
Girl pulling a coal tub in mine. From official report of the parliamentary commission in the mid-19th century.

The rapid growth in population in the 19th century in the cities included the new industrial and manufacturing cities, as well as service centres such as Edinburgh and London. The critical factor was financing, which was handled by building societies that dealt directly with large contracting firms. Private renting from housing landlords was the dominant tenure. P. Kemp says this was usually of advantage to tenants. People moved in so rapidly that there was not enough capital to build adequate housing for everyone, so low-income newcomers squeezed into increasingly overcrowded slums. Clean water, sanitation, and public health facilities were inadequate; the death rate was high, especially infant mortality, and tuberculosis among young adults. Cholera from polluted water and typhoid were endemic. Unlike rural areas, there were no famines such as the one which devastated Ireland in the 1840s.

== Poverty ==
19th-century Britain saw a huge population increase accompanied by rapid urbanisation stimulated by the Industrial Revolution. Wage rates improved steadily; real wages (after taking inflation into account) were 65 percent higher in 1901, compared to 1871. Much of the money was saved, as the number of depositors in savings banks rose from 430,000 in 1831, to 5.2 million in 1887, and their deposits from £14 million to over £90 million. People flooded into industrial areas and commercial cities faster than housing could be built, resulting in overcrowding and lagging sanitation facilities such as fresh water and sewage.

These problems were magnified in London, where the population grew at record rates. Large houses were turned into flats and tenements, and as landlords failed to maintain these dwellings, slum housing developed. Kellow Chesney described the situation as follows: "Hideous slums, some of them acres wide, some no more than crannies of obscure misery, make up a substantial part of the metropolis... In big, once handsome houses, thirty or more people of all ages may inhabit a single room." Significant changes happened in the British Poor Law system in England and Wales, Scotland, and Ireland. These included a large expansion in workhouses (or poorhouses in Scotland), although with changing populations during the era.

== Child labour ==
The early Victorian era before the reforms of the 1840s became notorious for the employment of young children in factories and mines and as chimney sweeps. Child labour played an important role in the Industrial Revolution from its outset: novelist Charles Dickens, for example, worked at the age of 12 in a blacking factory, with his family in a debtors' prison. Reformers wanted the children in school: in 1840 only about 20 percent of the children in London had any schooling. By the 1850s, around half of the children in England and Wales were in school (not including Sunday school). From the Factory Act 1833 onwards, attempts were made to get child labourers into part-time education though these were often difficult to enforce in practise. It was only in the 1870s and 1880s that children began to be compelled into school.

The children of the poor were expected to help towards the family budget, often working long hours in dangerous jobs for low wages. Agile boys were employed by the chimney sweeps; small children were employed to scramble under machinery to retrieve cotton bobbins; and children were also employed to work in coal mines, crawling through tunnels too narrow and low for adults. Children also worked as errand boys, crossing sweepers, shoe blacks, or sold matches, flowers, and other cheap goods. Some children undertook work as apprentices to respectable trades, such as building, or as domestic servants (there were over 120,000 domestic servants in London in the mid 19th century). Working hours were long: builders might work 64 hours a week in summer and 52 in winter, while domestic servants were theoretically on duty 80-hours a week:

Mother bides at home, she is troubled with bad breath, and is sair weak in her body from early labour. I am wrought with sister and brother, it is very sore work; cannot say how many rakes or journeys I make from pit's bottom to wall face and back, thinks about 30 or 25 on the average; the distance varies from 100 to 250 fathom. I carry about 1 cwt. and a quarter on my back; have to stoop much and creep through water, which is frequently up to the calves of my legs.

— Isabella Read, 12 years old, coal-bearer, testimony gathered by Ashley's Mines Commission 1842

As early as 1802 and 1819, Factory Acts were passed to limit the working hours of children in factories and cotton mills to 12 hours per day. These acts were largely ineffective and after radical agitation, by for example the "Short Time Committees" in 1831, a royal commission recommended in 1833 that children aged 11–18 should work a maximum of 12 hours per day, children aged 9–11 a maximum of eight hours, and children under the age of nine should no longer be permitted to work. This act, however, only applied to the textile industry, and further agitation led to another act in 1847 limiting both adults and children to 10-hour working days. The Mines and Collieries Act 1842 banned women and children from working in coal, iron, lead and tin mining.

== Trade unions ==
Unions in Britain were subject to often severe repression until 1824, but were already widespread in cities such as London. Trade unions were legalised in 1824. Soon growing numbers of craftsmen such as tailors, shoe-makers, carpenters and cabinet-makers started local trade unions. The goal was higher wages and a greater voice in working conditions.

Union activity in textiles and engineering was largely in the hands of the skilled workers. They supported differentials in pay and status as opposed to the unskilled. They focused on control over machine production and were aided by competition among firms in the local labour market.

After the Chartist movement of 1848 fragmented, efforts were made to form a labour coalition. The Miners' and Seamen's United Association in the North-East, operated 1851–1854 before it too collapsed because of outside hostility and internal disputes over goals. The leaders sought working-class solidarity as a long-term aim, thus anticipating the affiliative strategies promoted by the Labour Parliament of 1854.

More permanent trade unions were established from the 1850s, better resourced but often less radical. The London Trades Council was founded in 1860, and the Sheffield Outrages spurred the establishment of the Trades Union Congress in 1868. The legal status of trade unions in the United Kingdom was established by a Royal Commission on Trade Unions in 1867, which agreed that the establishment of the organisations was to the advantage of both employers and employees. Unions were legalised in 1871 with the adoption of the Trade Union Act 1871.

=== New Unionism: 1889–93 ===
The "aristocracy of labour" comprise the skilled workers who were proud and jealous of their monopolies, and set up labour unions to keep out the unskilled and semiskilled. The strongest unions of the mid-Victorian period were unions of skilled workers such as the Amalgamated Society of Engineers. Trade unionism was quite uncommon amongst semi-skilled and unskilled workers. The union officials avoided militancy, fearing that strikes would threaten the finances of unions and thereby their salaries. An unexpected strike wave broke out in 1889–90, largely instigated by the rank and file. Its success can be explained by the dwindling supply of rural labour, which in turn increased the bargaining power of unskilled workers. The New Unionism starting in 1889 was a systematic outreach to bring in as union members the striking unskilled and semiskilled workers. Ben Tillett was a prominent leader of the London Dock strike of 1889. He formed the Dock, Wharf, Riverside and General Labourers' Union in 1889, which had support from skilled workers. Its 30,000 members won an advance in wages and working conditions.

Unions played a prominent role in the creation of the Labour Representation Committee which effectively formed the basis for today's Labour Party.
