= Occupational disease =

Any chronic disorder that occurs as a result of work or occupational activity

- Other names: Occupational illnesses

An occupational disease or industrial disease is any chronic ailment that occurs as a result of work or occupational activity. It is an aspect of occupational safety and health. An occupational disease is typically identified when it is shown that it is more prevalent in a given body of workers than in the general population, or in other worker populations. The first such disease to be recognized, squamous-cell carcinoma of the scrotum, was identified in chimney sweep boys by Sir Percival Pott in 1775. Occupational hazards that are of a traumatic nature (such as falls by roofers) are not considered to be occupational diseases.

Under the law of workers' compensation in many jurisdictions, there is a presumption that specific diseases are caused by the worker being in the work environment and the burden is on the employer or insurer to show that the disease came about from another cause. Diseases compensated by national workers compensation authorities are often termed occupational diseases. However, many countries do not offer compensations for certain diseases like musculoskeletal disorders caused by work (e.g. in Norway). Therefore, the term work-related diseases is utilized to describe diseases of occupational origin. This term, however, would then include both compensable and non-compensable diseases that have occupational origins.

In a landmark study published by the World Health Organization and the International Labour Organization in 2021, 745,000 fatalities from coronary artery disease and stroke events in 2016 were attributed to exposure to long working hours. With these UN estimates, the global burden of work-related cardiovascular diseases has been quantified for the first time.

Occupational disease is expected to be reported less than actual figure. Neither educational material nor educational meeting increase the report of occupational disease. However, reminders on the legal obligation to report the occupational disease seem to increase physician reporting.

== Types ==
Some well-known occupational diseases include:

=== Lung diseases ===
Occupational lung diseases include asbestosis among asbestos miners and those who work with friable asbestos insulation, as well as black lung (coalworker's pneumoconiosis) among coal miners, silicosis among miners and quarrying and tunnel operators and byssinosis among workers in parts of the cotton textile industry.

Occupational asthma has a vast number of occupations at risk.

Bad indoor air quality may predispose for diseases in the lungs as well as in other parts of the body.

=== Skin diseases ===
Occupational skin diseases are ranked among the top five occupational diseases in many countries.

Occupational skin diseases and conditions are generally caused by chemicals and having wet hands for long periods while at work. Eczema is by far the most common, but urticaria, sunburn and skin cancer are also of concern.

Contact dermatitis due to irritation is inflammation of the skin which results from a contact with an irritant. It has been observed that this type of dermatitis does not require prior sensitization of the immune system. There have been studies to support that past or present atopic dermatitis is a risk factor for this type of dermatitis. Common irritants include detergents, acids, alkalis, oils, organic solvents and reducing agents.

The acute form of this dermatitis develops on exposure of the skin to a strong irritant or caustic chemical. This exposure can occur as a result of accident at a workplace. The irritant reaction increases in its intensity within minutes to hours of exposure and reaches its peak quickly. After the reaction has reached its peak level, it starts to heal. This process is known as decrescendo phenomenon. The most frequent potent irritants leading to this type of dermatitis are acids and alkaline solutions. The symptoms include redness and swelling of the skin along with the formation of blisters.

The chronic form occurs as a result of repeated exposure of the skin to weak irritants over long periods of time.

Clinical manifestations of contact dermatitis are also modified by external factors such as environmental factors (mechanical pressure, temperature, and humidity) and predisposing characteristics of the individual (age, sex, ethnic origin, preexisting skin disease, atopic skin diathesis, and anatomic region exposed).

Another occupational skin disease is glove-related hand urticaria, reported among healthcare workers. This type of hand urticaria is believed to be caused by repeated wearing and removal of the gloves. The reaction is caused by the latex or the nitrile present in the gloves.

High-risk occupations include:

- Hairdressing
- Catering
- Healthcare
- Printing
- Metal machining
- Motor vehicle repair
- Construction

=== Other diseases of concern ===
- Overuse syndrome among persons who perform repetitive or forceful movements in constrictive postures
- Carpal tunnel syndrome among persons who work in the poultry industry and information technology
- Computer vision syndrome among persons using information technology for hours
- Lead poisoning affecting workers in many industries that process or employ lead or lead compounds
- Infectious diseases transmitted through unsanitary working conditions, such as meningitis, whooping cough, or bloodborne illnesses

The List of Occupational Diseases of the International Labour Organization (ILO) also includes "mental and behavioral disorders associated with exposure to risk factors".

=== Historical ===
Donald Hunter, in his classic The Diseases of Occupations, discusses many example of occupational diseases. They include:

- Phossy jaw among the London matchgirls
- Radiation sickness among some persons who had been working in the nuclear industry
- Radium jaw among the Radium Girls
- Squamous cell carcinoma of the skin of the scrotum among chimney sweeps, known as chimney sweeps' carcinoma

Bernardino Ramazzini in his book, dated 1700, De Morbis Artificum Diatriba, outlined the health hazards of chemicals, dust, metals, repetitive or violent motions, odd postures, and other disease-causative agents encountered by workers in more than 50 occupations.

== Prevention ==
Prevention measures include avoidance of the irritant through its removal from the workplace or through technical shielding by the use of potent irritants in closed systems or automation, irritant replacement or removal and personal protection of the workers.

In order to better prevent and control occupational disease, most countries revise and update their related laws, most of them greatly increasing the penalties in case of breaches of the occupational disease laws. Occupational disease prevention, in general legally regulated, is part of good supply chain management and enables companies to design and ensure supply chain social compliance schemes as well as monitor their implementation to identify and prevent occupational disease hazards.

== In popular culture and literature ==
=== In literature ===
- The Jungle by Upton Sinclair
- Midnight in Chernobyl by Adam Higginbotham
- Radium Girls by Kate Moore

== See also ==
- Industrial and organizational psychology
- Occupational health psychology
- Occupational medicine
- Occupational safety and health
