= Occupational cancer =

- Other names: Workplace cancer
- Label for substances dangerous to human health.
- Specialty: Oncology, occupational safety
- Usual onset: >10 yrs from exposure
- Causes: Chemicals, radiation, shift work
- Prevention: Decreased use of certain chemicals, limiting exposure
- Frequency: 2 to 8% of cancers
- Deaths: 350,000 in 2016

Occupational cancers are cancers at least partly caused by exposures at work. Types commonly include lung cancer including mesothelioma, bladder cancer, and leukemia. The period between exposure and onset of cancer is often more than 10 years.

Risk factors include certain chemicals, radiation, and possibly shift work. Chemicals include asbestos, second hand smoke, silica dust, arsenic, radon, benzene, and diesel fumes. Other factors include frequency, amount, duration, and how the exposure occurs. Professions more commonly affected include farmers, miners, painters, firefighters, and manufacturers of aluminium and rubber.

Prevention involves decreasing the use of certain chemicals and if this isn't possible limiting exposure to these substances, a process known as hierarchy of controls. This often involves regulation and protective equipment. Agencies often specify maximum allowed exposures and may put in place routine monitoring. International Agency for Research on Cancer (IARC) and American Conference of Governmental Industrial Hygienists (ACGIH) have classifications for a substances risk.

Occupational cancer represents 2 to 8% of cancers and are responsible for about 3.5 to 5% of cancer deaths (350,000 in 2016). Males are more commonly affected than females. In the developed world they represent just over half of work related deaths. They were first identified in the 1700s by Percivall Pott among people who clean chimneys.
