= Percivall Pott =

English surgeon (1714–1788)

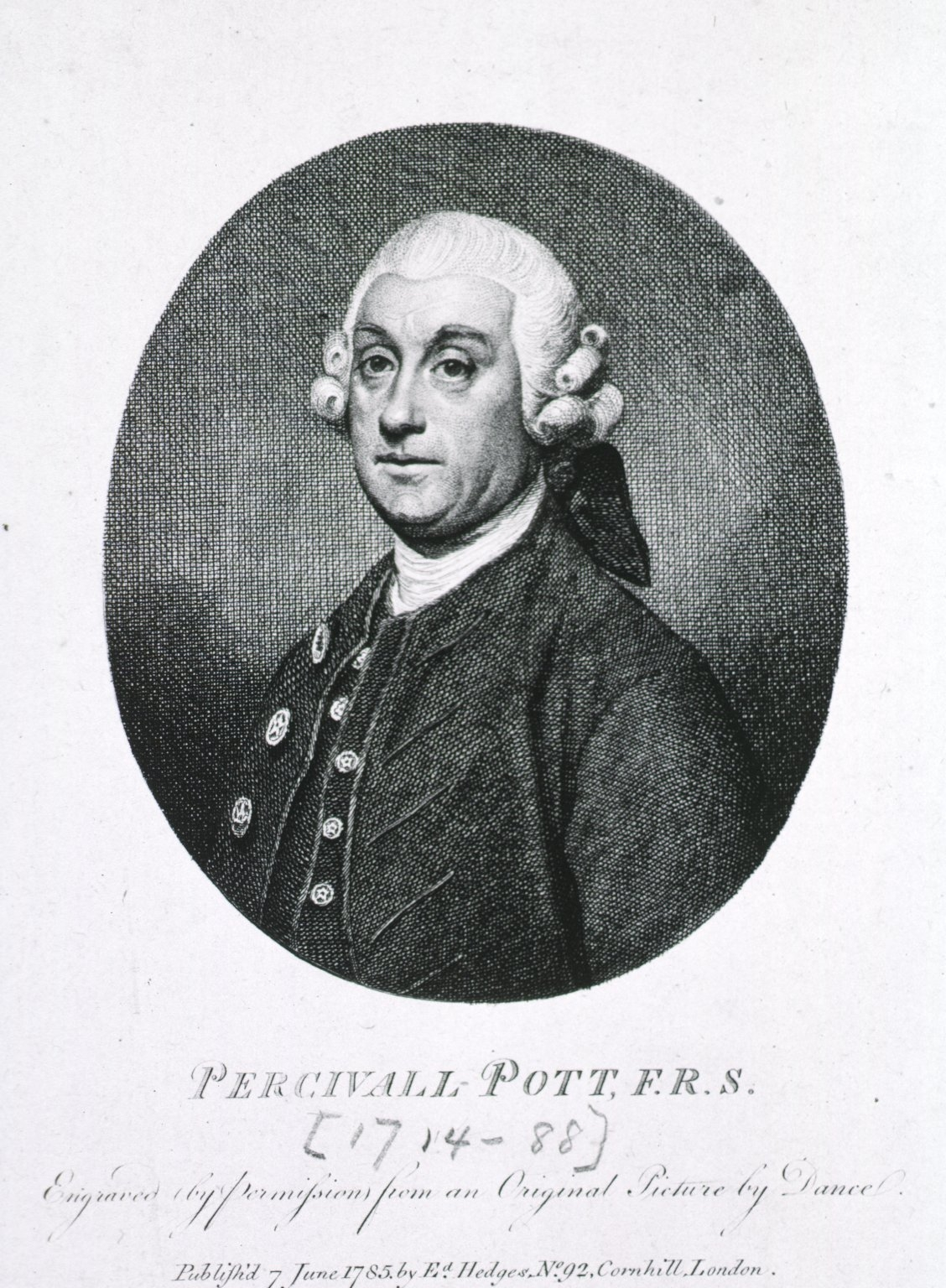
Percivall Pott, engraved from an original picture by Nathaniel Dance-Holland, National Library of Medicine, Images from the History of Medicine.

Percivall Pott (6 January 1714, in London – 22 December 1788) was an English surgeon, one of the founders of orthopaedics, and the first scientist to demonstrate that cancer may be caused by an environmental carcinogen, namely chimney sweeps' carcinoma. Many diseases are his namesake including Pott's fracture, Pott's disease of the spine, and Pott's puffy tumour. It is believed that Pott's standard of living contributed to the rise of the surgeon within social standings.

== Early life and education ==
Percivall Pott was born the son of Percivall Pott senior in London. His father died when he was a child, but Joseph Wilcocks, Bishop of Rochester, who was a relative of his mother, paid for his education. He served his apprenticeship with Edward Nourse, assistant surgeon to St Bartholomew's Hospital, and in 1736 was admitted to the Barbers' Company and licensed to practice.

== Career ==
He became assistant surgeon to St Bartholomew's in 1744 and full surgeon from 1749 till 1787. As the first surgeon of his day in England, excelling even his pupil, John Hunter, on the practical side, Pott introduced various important innovations in procedure, doing much to abolish the extensive use of escharotics and the cautery that was prevalent when he began his career.

In 1756, Pott sustained a broken leg after a fall from his horse. It is often assumed that his injury was the same one that later came to be known as Pott's fracture, but in reality, Pott's broken leg was a much more serious compound fracture of the tibia. As he lay on the ground, he sent a servant to buy a door from a nearby construction site, then had himself placed on the door and taken home. Surgeons cleaned the wound and discussed amputation, an operation which at the time had a very high rate of failure, as it often led to sepsis and death, but Pott prevailed on them to splint the leg, and he ultimately recovered completely.

Percivall Pott's dedication to his patients and standard of care garnered Pott high praise and fame. He is generally regarded as one of the two greatest surgeons of the 18th century along with his student John Hunter. Amid the patient wards, Pott also honed his writing skills and believed in patient education. He would distribute pamphlets, noting his observations and thoughts on topics ranging from "head injuries, hydrocele, fistula, rupture, and fracture", in the hospital environment. These pamphlets were in high demand and would sell for more than one shilling and sixpence. Between the 1760s and the 1770s over fourteen of Pott's pamphlets were in circulation.

In 1769 Pott published Some Few Remarks upon Fractures and Dislocations. The book was translated into French and Italian and had a far-reaching influence in Britain and France. His name was written in the annals of medicine, by first describing arthritic tuberculosis of the spine (Pott's disease). He gave an excellent clinical description in his Remarks on that Kind of Palsy of the Lower Limbs. Among his other writings, the most noteworthy are A Treatise on Ruptures (1756), and Chirurgical Observations.

In 1765, he was elected Master of the Company of Surgeons, the forerunner of the Royal College of Surgeons of England.

In 1775, Pott found an association between exposure to soot and a high incidence of scrotal cancer later found to be a type of squamous cell carcinoma in chimney sweeps. This disease, later termed chimney sweeps' carcinoma due to Pott's investigation, was the first occupational link to cancer, and Pott became the first person to associate a malignancy with an environmental carcinogen, implicating chimney soot as a direct contact carcinogen to skin.

A manuscript of his 1779 lectures on surgery is held in the medical manuscripts collection of the University of Manchester Library.

In 1786, he was honoured as the first Honorary Fellow of the Royal College of Surgeons of Edinburgh. Shortly after, he retired in 1787 and was named a governor of St. Bartholomew's Hospital.

== Personal life ==
in 1740, Percivall Pott married Sarah Elizabeth Cruttenden (1725–1811), daughter of the wealthy merchant Robert Cruttenden and his wife Sarah Cliff. They lived together in Lincoln's Inn Fields in London and had five sons and four daughters, including Joseph Pott, Archdeacon of London, Samuel, a leading newspaper editor and owner of Saunders Newsletter, and Mary (Polly), who married the long-serving Irish judge Robert Day.

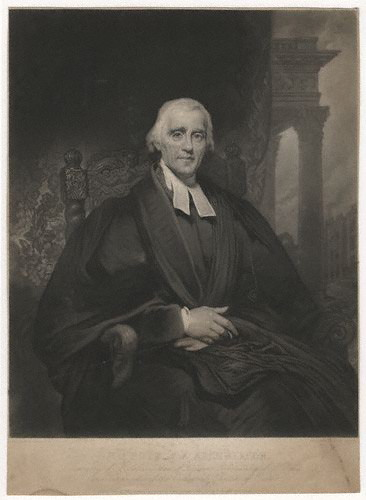
Percivall's son, Joseph Holden Pott, Archdeacon of London, 1843 mezzotint by John Porter

Although little more is known about Percivall Pott's private life, Pott is regularly described as having excellent character, and an archetypical English surgeon. It is believed that Pott's standard of living (he was rich enough to give Polly a dowry of £5000) was a contributor to the rise of the surgeon within social standings.

== Chimney sweepers' carcinoma ==
Percivall Pott has influenced medicine and modern understanding of diseases. Many diseases are his namesake including: Pott's fracture, Pott's disease of the spine, and Pott's puffy tumor. One disease which does not, yet is important to Pott's legacy is chimney sweeper's carcinoma. Pott quickly recognised the association between carcinoma and chimney sweeps and published his findings in a piece titled "Chirurgical Observations relative to…the cancer of the scrotum." He wrote that the disease was, " peculiar to a certain sort of people [ and ] which has not at least to my knowledge, been publicly noticed – I mean the chimney-sweepers ’ cancer. The disease, in these people, seems to derive its origin from a lodgment of soot in the rugae of the scrotum."

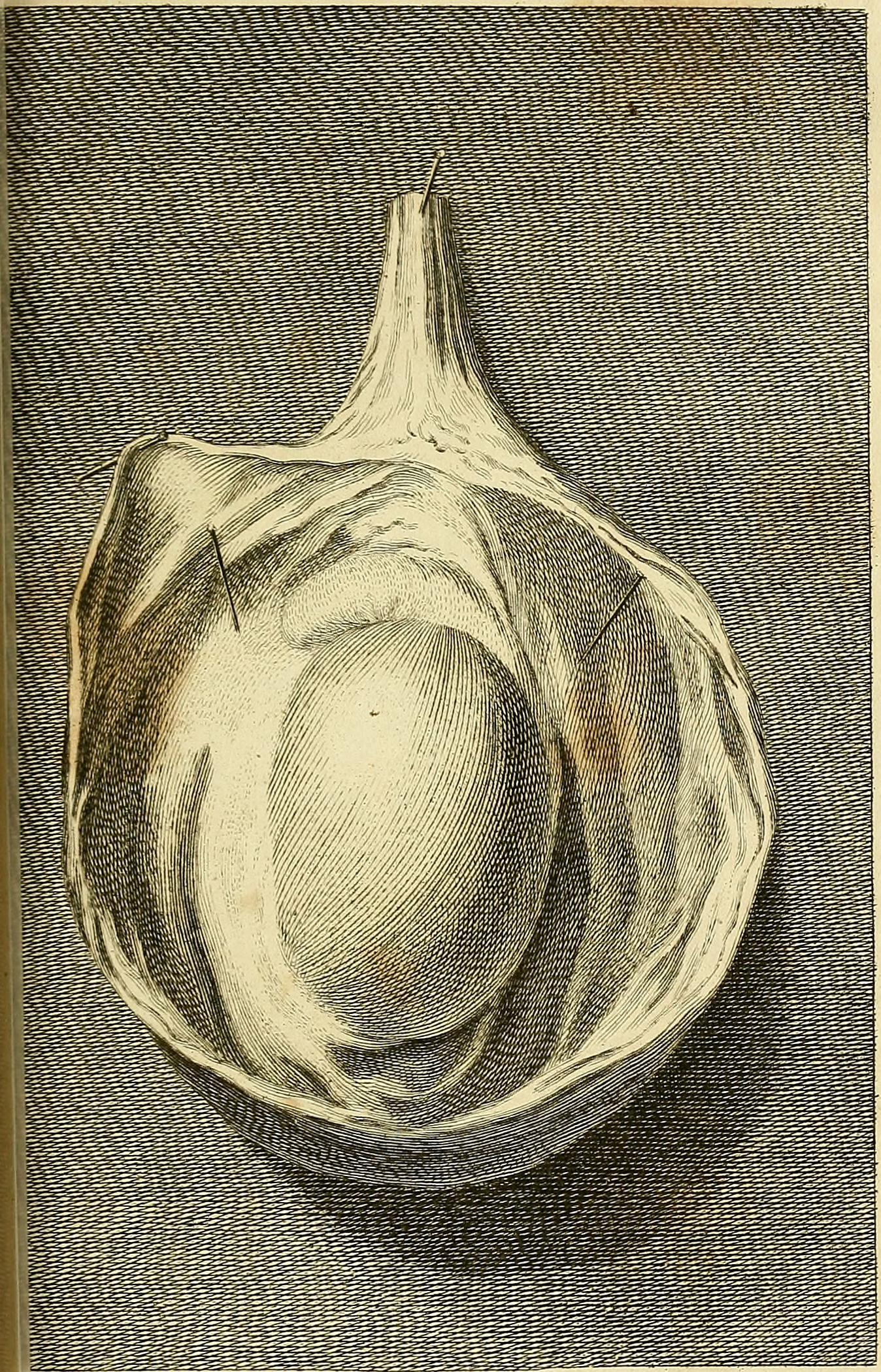
Diagram from the chirurgical works of Percivall Pott

=== Discovery and identification credit ===
Scrotal cancer, although largely thought to have been identified by Percivall Pott, had been thought to have been described nearly 40 years before Pott's "Chirurgical Observations" as a "canker of privities" per documentation in the burial records of the Parish of St. Botolph without Aldgate from 1589 to 1599. These descriptions are ambiguous and it is unclear which anatomical parts are considered "privities". As such, most historians generally agree, that Bassius first correctly described scrotal cancer in 1731. Some historians argue that what Bassius considered scrotal cancer was in fact perineal abscesses to the scrotum as opposed to carcinoma. The minority of historians who agree with this fact, attribute the discovery of scrotal cancer to Treyling in 1740.

=== Surgery ===
As a surgeon, Pott was well respected and often assisted fellow surgeons. Pott was viewed as a mentor and even allowed other physicians and surgeons to live with him while under his guidance. Despite the surgical trends of his time, Pott did not agree with severe treatments and heroic medicine but rather preferred gentler forms. Percivall Pott's son-in-law, James Earle, described Pott's surgery as being "divested of great part of its horrors, became, comparatively, a pleasing study."

=== Soot and occupational cancer ===
In addition to surgery, Pott's focused on public health as well drawing his attention to the challenges of chimney sweeps in his community. He wrote, "in their early infancy, they are most frequently treated with great brutality, and almost starved with cold and hunger; they are thrust up narrow, and sometimes hot chimneys, where they are bruised, burned and almost suffocated; and when they get to puberty, become peculiarly liable to a most noisome, painful, and fatal disease." Pott's approach was unique amongst his contemporaries in that he did not simply note an association but approached chimney sweeps' carcinoma from a causal perspective. His work helped later identify soot as the disease-causing agent. Pott did not figure this out on his own, but rather pointed research in the right direction. During Pott's time, there were many discussions pertaining to the cause of scrotal cancer. James Earle believed that the cancer was caused as a result of the soot entering and residing in the rugae of the scrotum. He famously argued this point based on a trend seen where gardeners who used soot to kill slugs had developed skin carcinoma on their hands. In 1878, George Lawson suggested that the cancer was caused by the friction generated by the chimney sweeper's overalls against the scrotum while sifting through soot. This idea was explored by Passey in 1992 who demonstrated that it was the ethereal extract of soot which was capable of inducing sarcoma. Furthermore, Pott also identified that prepubescent boys were most vulnerable to the carcinoma. Pott rose to fame for these connections between occupational hazards and cancer malignancy even though the connection was not fully understood at the time. Pott's "Chirurgical Observations" provided a framework to shape the modern understanding of Occupational cancers.

== Legacy ==
Percivall Pott's work influenced a wave of research and change in public policies. After his initial publication, more clinical cases began to emerge rapidly over the following years. This triggered a series of "Chimney Sweepers' Acts" which aimed to protect chimney sweepers. These facilitated the formation of societies like the "Society for Superseding the Necessity of Climbing Boys, by Encouraging a New Method of Sweeping Chimneys and for Improving the Condition of Children and Others Employed by Chimney Sweepers" in 1803 which included the likes of Dukes, Earls, and Royal Patrons.

Despite the outcry and public demands to change chimney sweeping practices, such as suggesting that young chimney sweeping boys be replaced with mechanical devices, insurance companies, and homeowners argued that Chimney Sweeper's carcinoma was a small price to pay for the protection of the mass population against smoke and chimney fires. There was pressure for action as early as 1788, yet it was not until 1875 that Pott's work finally began to influence change: in this year a decline in scrotal cancer incidence and mortality was noted.

Latter animal studies (1933) painting coal tar onto skin would demonstrate the role of the first proven chemical carcinogen benzo(a)pyrene, which occurs in high concentrations in smoke and chimney soot, with the process that Pott first identified. Pott's early investigations thus contributed to the science of epidemiology and the Chimney Sweepers Act 1788.

== See also ==
- Cancer cluster
- History of medicine
- History of surgery
- Pott disease
