= Glass (disambiguation) =

Glass is an amorphous material commonly used in windows, tableware, optoelectronics, and decorative items.

Glass or Glasses may also refer to:

== Common uses ==
- Glass (drinkware), a drinking vessel
- Glasses, spectacles or eyeglasses

== Arts, entertainment, and media ==
=== Film and television ===
- Glass (1958 film), a short documentary film about the glass industry in the Netherlands
- Glass (1989 film), an Australian erotic thriller
- Glass (2019 film), a film directed by M. Night Shyamalan
- Glass, television identifications 1991–1993 for BBC2
- "The Glasses", a 1993 episode of the TV series Seinfeld

=== Music ===
- Glass (band), a progressive rock band from the Pacific Northwest
- Glass (EP), a 2003 EP by the Sea and Cake
- Glasses (album), a 1979 album by Joe McPhee
- "Glass" (composition), a 2018 composition by Alva Noto and Ryuichi Sakamoto
- "Glass" (Thompson Square song), 2011
- "Glass" (From Her Eyes song), 2015
- "Glass", a song by Joy Division from Still
- "Glass", a 1967 song by the Sandpipers
- "Glass", a song by Bat for Lashes from Two Suns
- "Glass", a song by Julian Casablancas from Phrazes for the Young
- "Glass", a song by Kasabian from 48:13
- "Glass", a composition by Hania Rani from Esja
- "The Glass", a song by The Story So Far from the 2013 album What You Don't See

=== Other media ===
- Glass (novel), a novel by Ellen Hopkins

== Places ==
- Glass, Aberdeenshire, a village in Scotland
- Glass, Texas, an unincorporated community in Texas
- River Glass (disambiguation)

== Science and technology ==
=== Computing ===
- GLASS (software bundle), a solution stack based on GemStone, Linux, Apache, Seaside and Smalltalk
- Glass, an esoteric programming language developed by Gregor Richards in 2005
- Google Glass, a wearable computer with a head-mounted display

=== Materials ===
- Glass, the disordered (amorphous) quality of a spin glass magnet
- Glass transition, or glass–liquid transition
- Volcanic glass, a substance formed by rapid cooling of magma
- Amorphous solid, a class of compounds often generically described as "glasses"

=== Other uses in science and technology ===
- Glass or methamphetamine, a psychostimulant of the phenethylamine and amphetamine class of psychoactive drugs

== Other uses ==
- Glass (surname), a list of people with the name
- Glassing, a physical attack using a glass as a weapon
- Marine sandglass, a device for measuring time at sea in the 18-19th centuries, with increments being measured in "glasses"

== See also ==
- Glacé (disambiguation)
- Glas (disambiguation)
- Glasse, a surname
- Glassy (disambiguation)
