= Glas =

Glas or GLAS may refer to:

== Organisations ==
- Hans Glas GmbH, a former German automotive company
- Glas (political party), Croatian acronym of Građansko-liberalni savez, Civic Liberal Alliance
- Glas (publisher), a Russian publishing house

== Arts and media ==
- Glas, former name of Glas Srpske, a Bosnian-Herzegovinian newspaper
- Glas (album), an album by Nina Chuba
- Glas (book), a 1974 book by Jacques Derrida
- Glas (film), a 1958 Dutch documentary film
- Glas (TV channel), Ukrainian satellite channel

== People ==
- Glas (surname), including a list of people with the name
- Eochaid Faebar Glas, a mythical High King of Ireland

== See also ==
- List of islands called Eilean Glas
- Doktor Glas, a 1905 novel by Hjalmar Söderberg
- Glass (disambiguation)
