= Glassing (disambiguation) =

Glassing is an attack with a glass or bottle.

Glassing may also refer to the activities of:

- observing through binoculars
- fitting with glazing
- melting into glass, for example after a nuclear detonation (see e.g. trinitite)
- coating (e.g. a surfboard) with resin-saturated fibreglass

== See also ==
- Glass (disambiguation)
