= Dimke =

Dimke is a German surname. Notable people with the surname include:

- Derek Dimke (born 1990), American football placekicker
- Harold Dimke (born 1949), German rower
- Mary K. Dimke (born 1977/78), American judge

== See also ==
- Dumke
- Imke
