= Glassie =

Glassie may refer to:

- Glassie (surname)
- An alternative name for bar-back
