= Henry Glass =

Henry Glass may refer to:

- Henry Glass (admiral) (1844–1908), Rear Admiral, U.S. Navy
- Henry P. Glass (1911–2003), Austrian-born American architect and industrial designer

== See also ==
- Henry Glassie (born 1941), emeritus College Professor of Folklore at Indiana University Bloomington
- Henry Glaß (born 1953), German ski jumper
- Glass (surname)
