= Chuck Harrison =

Chuck Harrison may refer to:

- Charles "Chuck" Harrison (1931–2018), American industrial designer
- Chuck Harrison (baseball) (1941–2023), American baseball player

== See also ==
- Chuck Harmison (born 1958), American basketball player
