= List of trichloroethylene-related incidents =

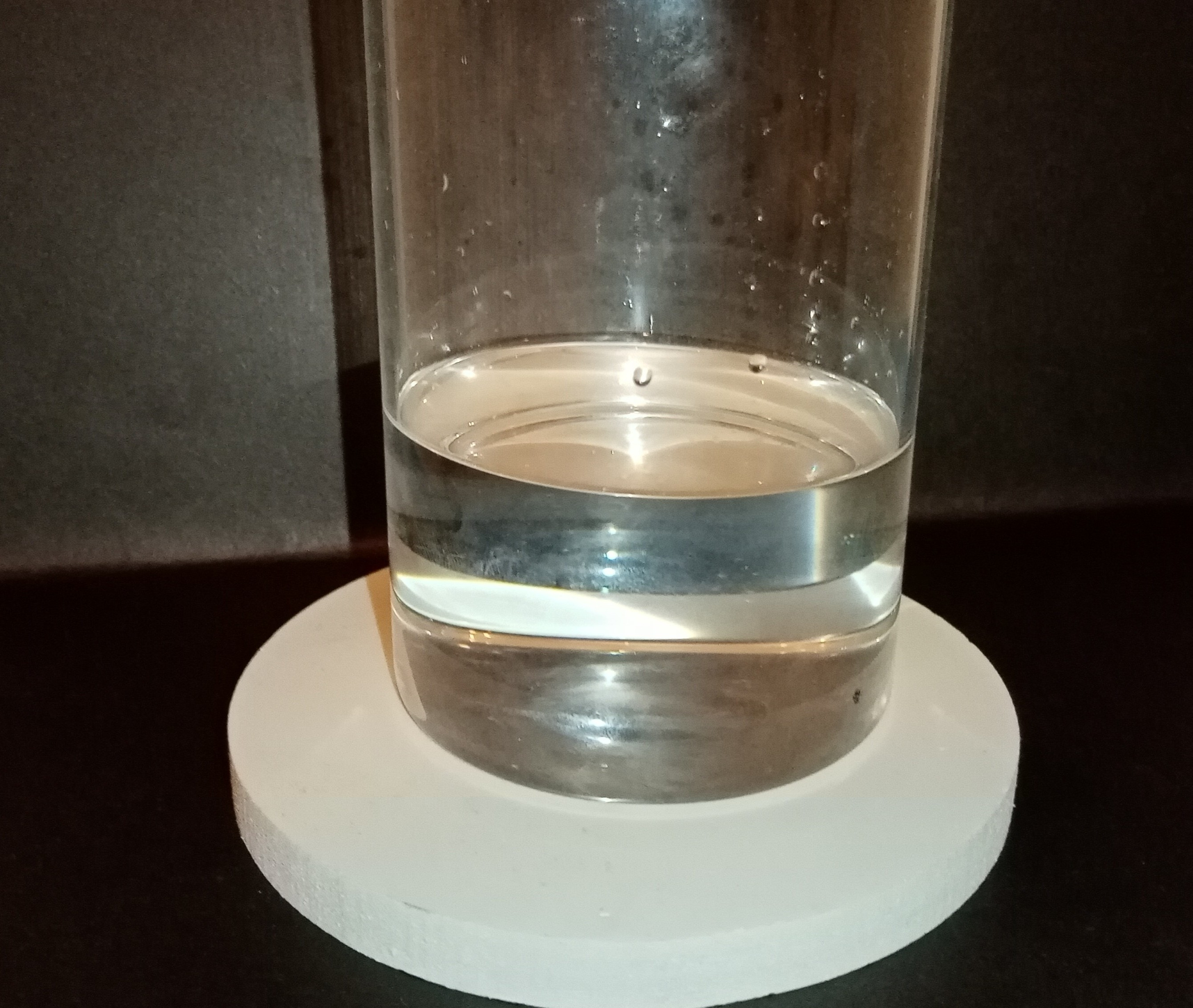
Liquid Trichloroethylene

Trichloroethylene (TCE) is a common industrial solvent mostly used for metal degreasing. Due to its wide use in industries, there have been several incidences of waste TCE leaking into aquifers and contaminating groundwaters.

Due to their similar industrial uses, areas contaminated with mainly TCE may also be contaminated with tetrachloroethylene in smaller amounts.

== Background ==
The first known report of TCE in groundwater was given in 1949 by two English public chemists who described two separate instances of well contamination by industrial releases of TCE.

Exposure to TCE occurs mainly through contaminated drinking water. With a specific gravity greater than 1 (denser than water), trichloroethylene can be present as a dense non-aqueous phase liquid (DNAPL) if sufficient quantities are introduced into the environment. Another significant source of vapor exposure in Superfund sites that has contaminated groundwater, such as at the Twin Cities Army Ammunition Plant, was by showering. TCE readily volatilizes out of hot water and into the air. Long, hot showers would then volatilize more TCE into the air. In a home closed tightly to conserve the cost of heating and cooling, these vapors would then recirculate. Based on available federal and state surveys, between 9% and 34% of the drinking water supply sources tested in the U.S. may have some TCE contamination, though EPA has reported that most water supplies are in compliance with the maximum contaminant level (MCL) of 5 ppb.

In addition, a growing concern in recent years at sites with TCE contamination in soil or groundwater has been vapor intrusion in buildings, which has resulted in indoor air exposures, such is in a recent case in the McCook Field neighborhood of Dayton, Ohio, United States. Trichloroethylene has been detected in 852 Superfund sites across the United States, according to the Agency for Toxic Substances and Disease Registry (ATSDR). Under the Safe Drinking Water Act of 1974, and as amended annual water quality testing is required for all public drinking water distributors. The EPA'S current guidelines for TCE are online.

The EPA's table of "TCE Releases to Ground" is dated 1987 to 1993, thereby omitting one of the largest Superfund cleanup sites in the nation, the North IBW in Scottsdale, Arizona. Earlier, TCE was dumped here, and was subsequently detected in the municipal drinking water wells in 1982, prior to the study period.

Marine Corps Base Camp Lejeune in North Carolina may be the largest TCE contamination site in the United States. Legislation could force the EPA to establish a health advisory and a national public drinking water regulation to limit trichloroethylene.

The 1998 film A Civil Action dramatizes the EPA lawsuit Anne Anderson, et al., v. Cryovac, Inc. concerning trichloroethylene contamination that occurred in Woburn, Massachusetts in the 1970s and 1980s.

== 1980s ==
- Between 1975 and 1985, the water supply of Marine Corps Base Camp Lejeune was contaminated with trichloroethylene and other volatile organic compounds.
- In 1986, and later again in 2009, 2 plumes containing trichloroethylene was found on Long Island, New York due to Northrop Grumman's Bethpage factories that worked in conjunction with the United States Navy during the 1930s and 1940s.
- In 1988, the EPA discovered tons of TCE that had been leaked or dumped into the ground by the United States military and semiconductor industry (companies including Fairchild Semiconductor, Intel Corporation, and Raytheon Company) just outside NASA Ames in Moffett Field, Mountain View, California.
- In 1987, Hill Air Force Base, in Layton, Utah, was declared a Superfund site in 1987 and added to the U.S. Environmental Protection Agency's National Priorities List. Contamination of TCE has been detected in the groundwater throughout Weber County, Utah.

== 1990s ==
- In 1990, Fort Ord, California was added to the EPA's National Priorities List. Veterans have linked trichloroethylene as the underlying cause for high incidence rates of multiple myeloma.
- In 1992, Lockformer conducted soil sampling on their property and found TCE in the soil at levels as high as 680 parts per million (ppm). During the summer of 2000, a group of residents hired legal counsel, and on October 11, 2000, these residents had their private well water tested by a private environmental consultant. The group owned homes south of the Lockformer property in the suspected path of groundwater flow. The consultant collected a second round of well water samples on November 10, 2000, and TCE was detected in some of the wells sampled. Beginning in December 2000, Illinois EPA collected about 350 more private well water samples north and south of the Lockformer property.
- For over 20 years of operation, RCA Corporation had been pouring toxic wastewater into a well in its Taoyuan City, Taiwan facility. The pollution from the plant was not revealed until 1994, when former workers brought it to light. Investigation by the Taiwan Environmental Protection Administration confirmed that RCA had been dumping chlorinated organic solvents into a secret well and caused contamination to the soil and groundwater surrounding the plant site. High levels of TCE and tetrachloroethylene can be found in groundwater drawn as far as two kilometers from the site.
- In 1998, the View-Master factory supply well in Beaverton, Oregon was found to have been contaminated with high levels of TCE. It was estimated that 25,000 factory workers had been exposed to it from 1950 to 2001.
- In the case of Lisle, Illinois, releases of trichloroethylene had allegedly occurred on the Lockformer property beginning in 1968 and continuing for an undetermined period. The company used TCE in the past as a degreaser to clean metal parts. Contamination at the Lockformer site is presently under investigation by the U.S. Environmental Protection Agency and Illinois EPA.

== 2000s and 2010s ==
- As of 2007, 57,000 pounds, or 28.5 tons of TCE have been removed from the system of wells that once supplied drinking water to the residents of Scottsdale, Arizona. One of the three drinking water wells previously owned by the City of Phoenix and ultimately sold to the City of Scottsdale, tested at 390 ppb TCE when it was closed in 1982. The City of Scottsdale recently updated its website to clarify that the contaminated wells were "in the Scottsdale area," and amended all references to the measured levels of TCE discovered when the wells were closed (including "390 ppb") to "trace".
- In June 2012, residents of an area off of Stony Hill Road, Wake Forest, NC were contacted by the EPA and DWQ about possible TCE contamination after authorities followed up on existing TCE contamination in 2005. Subsequent EPA testing found multiple sites with detectable levels of TCE and several with levels above the MCL.
- In December 2017, tonnes of waste TCE and tetrachloroethylene were dumped into sewers in the Tuzla district of Istanbul, Turkey. The leak had allegedly affected thousands of people, especially those with asthma, in neighbouring areas and about 97 people were hospitalised. The Istanbul Metropolitan Municipality (İBB) has stated that the situation did not possess any danger to human health. Various residents have said that it was a "normal occurrence", chemical leaks were "the fate of Tuzla" and they consumed yoghurt after the heavy exposure. Trichloroethylene is widely used and unregulated in Turkey, the TCE import was thought to be about 2.16 million dollars in 2020.
- In February 2020, McClymonds High School in West Oakland, California was temporarily closed after trichloroethylene was found in groundwater beneath the school.

== Regulations ==
=== United States ===
Until recent years, the US Agency for Toxic Substances and Disease Registry (ATSDR) contended that trichloroethylene had little-to-no carcinogenic potential, and was probably a co-carcinogen—that is, it acted in concert with other substances to promote the formation of tumors.

In 2023, the United States EPA determined that trichloroethylene presents an unreasonable risk of injury to human health under 52 out of 54 conditions of use, including during manufacturing, processing, mixing, recycling, vapor degreasing, as a lubricant, adhesive, sealant, cleaning product, and spray. It is dangerous from both inhalation and dermal exposure and was most strongly associated with immunosuppressive effects for acute exposure, as well as autoimmune effects for chronic exposures.

As of June 1, 2023, two U.S. states (Minnesota and New York) have acted on the EPA's findings and banned trichloroethylene in all cases but research and development.

==== Proposed U.S. federal regulation ====
In 2001, a draft report of the Environmental Protection Agency (EPA) laid the groundwork for tough new standards to limit public exposure to trichloroethylene. The assessment set off a fight between the EPA and the Department of Defense (DoD), the Department of Energy, and NASA, who appealed directly to the White House. They argued that the EPA had produced junk science, its assumptions were badly flawed, and that evidence exonerating the chemical was ignored.

The DoD has about 1,400 military properties nationwide that are contaminated with trichloroethylene. Many of these sites are detailed and updated by www.cpeo.org and include a former ammunition plant in the Twin Cities area. Twenty three sites in the Energy Department's nuclear weapons complex—including Lawrence Livermore National Laboratory in the San Francisco Bay area, and NASA centers, including the Jet Propulsion Laboratory in La Cañada Flintridge are reported to have TCE contamination.

Political appointees in the EPA sided with the Pentagon and agreed to pull back the risk assessment. In 2004, the National Academy of Sciences was given a $680,000 contract to study the matter, releasing its report in the summer of 2006. The report has raised more concerns about the health effects of TCE.

=== European Union ===
In the European Union, the Scientific Committee on Occupational Exposure Limit Values (SCOEL) recommends an exposure limit for workers exposed to trichloroethylene of 10 ppm (54.7 mg/m^{3}) for 8-hour TWA and of 30 ppm (164.1 mg/m^{3}) for STEL (15 minutes).

Existing EU legislation aimed at protection of workers against risks to their health (including Chemical Agents Directive 98/24/EC and Carcinogens Directive 2004/37/EC) currently do not impose binding minimum requirements for controlling risks to workers health during the use phase or throughout the life cycle of trichloroethylene. However, in case the ongoing discussions under the Carcinogens Directive will result in setting of a binding Occupational Exposure Limit for trichloroethylene for protection of workers; this conclusion may be revisited.

The Solvents Emissions Directive 1999/13/EC and Industrial Emissions Directive 2010/75/EC impose binding minimum requirements for emissions of trichloroethylene to the environment for certain activities, including surface cleaning. However, the activities with solvent consumption below a specified threshold are not covered by these minimum requirements.

According to European regulation, the use of trichloroethylene is prohibited for individuals at a concentration greater than 0.1%. In industry, trichloroethylene should be substituted before April 21, 2016 (unless an exemption is requested before October 21, 2014) by other products such as tetrachloroethylene (perchloroethylene), methylene chloride (dichloromethane), or other hydrocarbon derivatives (ketones, alcohols, ...).

=== Reduced production ===
The use of TCE in the U.S. peaked around 1970, then declined significantly due to regulatory and economic factors. As a result, 1,1,1-trichloroethane (TCA) became a common substitute in metal degreasing and cleaning applications. However, alternatives to chlorinated aliphatic hydrocarbons have since proliferated, as many of these compounds have been phased out across industries due to their health risks and the associated legal liabilities.

The U.S. military has virtually eliminated its use of the chemical, allegedly purchasing only 11 gallons in 2005. About 100 tons of it was used annually in the U.S. as of 2006.
