= Imke =

Imke is a given name. Notable people with the given name include:

- Imke Bartels (born 1977), Dutch equestrian
- Imke Courtois (born 1988), Belgian footballer and sports analyst
- Imke David (born 1967), German viol player, author, professor and ensemble-member
- Imke Duplitzer (born 1975), German épée fencer
- Imke Glas (born 1994), Dutch artistic gymnast
- Imke Onnen (born 1994), German high jumper
- Imke Vervaet (born 1993), Belgian sprinter
