= David L. Bassett =

American physician and academic

David Lee Bassett (December 31, 1913 – November 17, 1966) was an American physician and academic.

Bassett was born in Palo Alto, California, the son of Stanford University speech professor Lee Emerson Bassett. He graduated from Stanford University School of Medicine in 1939. He was an expert of anatomy and dissection at the University of Washington and best known for creating, in collaboration with William Gruber, the 25-volume "Stereoscopic Atlas of Human Anatomy" in 1962. The atlas is a series of paired slides that use Gruber's View-Master three-dimensional viewing system to display a perception of depth and levels of detail that made Bassett's work pioneering. Bassett died in Seattle soon after from amyloid disease; his materials were used in revisions and other works with permission of his widow Lucille F. Bassett.
