= Glassie (surname) =

Glassie is a surname. Notable people with the surname include:

- Henry Glassie (born 1941), American folklorist
- Nandi Glassie (1951–2020), Cook Islands politician
- Tere Glassie (born 1977), English rugby league footballer

== See also ==
- Glasse
