= Edward Glass =

Edward Glass may refer to:

- Edward Brown Glass (1913–1995), Anglican priest and archdeacon on Isle of Man
- Edward Francis Glass (1885–1954), architect in California
- Eddie Glass, frontman of American rock band Nebula

== See also ==
- Glass (surname)
