= Glass (surname) =

Glass or Glaß is a surname with several sources. It can be Cornish, English, German, Russian/Slavic, Irish or Scottish. Many with the last name Glass, are of eastern European descent, where Glass is a shortened version of their original last name. It is also a Jewish surname, adopted by some Eastern European Ashkenazi in the nineteenth century. After being forced by the authorities to take on a surname, Jews in this area typically chose names referring to places, animals, occupations or signifying personal traits. The name Glass referred to Glass-making, Glazing and the Glass trade.

== Notable people with the surname ==
- Albert Glass (1935–2017), Tristanian police officer and civil servant
- Alice Glass (born 1988), vocalist of Crystal Castles
- Alice Glass (1911–1976, maiden name of Alice Marsh, American socialite
- Aqeel Glass (born 1998), American football player
- Ari Glass (born 1989), American painter
- H. Bentley Glass (1906–2005), American geneticist
- Butch Glass (1898–1972), American baseball player
- Caitlin Glass (born 1981), American voice actress
- Carter Glass (1858–1946), American politician
- Charles Glass (born 1951), American broadcaster
- Cheryl Glass (1961–1997), American racing driver
- Christian Glass (died 2022), American man who was shot dead
- Cody Glass (born 1999), Canadian ice hockey player
- Conrad Glass (born 1961), Tristanian police inspector and civil servant
- Darren Glass (born 1981), Australian footballer
- David Glass (Canadian politician) (1829–1906), Canadian lawyer
- David Glass (sociologist) (1911–1978), English sociologist
- David D. Glass (1935–2020), Kansas City Royals owner
- Deborah Glass (born 1959), Deputy Chair of the UK's Independent Police Complaints Commission
- Dominion Robert Glass (1895–1968) African-American educator and academic administrator
- Eduard Glass (1902–after 1980), Austrian chess master
- Edward Glass (disambiguation), several people
- Franklin Potts Glass, Sr. (1858–1934), American publisher
- Fridolin Glass (1910–1943), Austrian Nazi activist and SS officer
- Gene V. Glass (born 1940), American statistician and education researcher
- George Glass (1910–1984), American film producer and publicist
- Gerald Glass (born 1967), American basketball player
- Geri Glass (born 1949), American model
- Glen Glass (born 1965), American politician
- Harold Glass (1918–1989), Australian judge and jurist
- Harry Glaß (1930–1997), German ski jumper
- Helen Glass (1917–2015), Canadian nurse and educator
- Henry Glass (disambiguation), several people
- Henry Glaß (born 1953), German ski jumper
- Henry Glass (admiral) (1844–1908), American admiral
- Henry P. Glass (1911–2003), Austrian-born American architect and industrial designer
- Hugh Glass (1780–1833), fur trapper and frontiersman
- Ira Glass (born 1959), host of This American Life
- Jack Glass (1936–2004), Scottish evangelical preacher
- James Glass (born 1961), Tristanian civil servant
- Jeff Glass (athlete) (born 1962), Canadian hurdler
- Jeff Glass (ice hockey) (born 1985), American ice hockey player
- Jesse Glass (born 1954), American writer and poet
- Jimmy Glass (born 1973), English football player
- Joanna Glass (born 1936), Canadian playwright
- John Judah Glass (1895–1973), Canadian politician
- Joseph Glass (disambiguation), multiple people
- Julia Glass (born 1956), American writer
- Kim Glass (born 1984), American volleyball player
- Lewis Glass (1946–2019), Tristanian civil servant
- Louis Glass (1864–1936), Danish composer
- N. Louise Glass (active since 1989), American microbial scientist
- Max Glass (1881–1965), Austrian film producer
- Ned Glass (1906–1984), Polish-born American character actor
- Pat Glass (born 1957), British politician
- Paul Glass (born 1934), Swiss-American composer
- Philip Glass (born 1937), American composer and pianist
- Presley T. Glass (1824–1902), American politician
- Richard Atwood Glass (1820–1873), English cable manufacturer and politician
- Ron Glass (1945–2016), American actor
- Shaun Glass, guitarist for the band SOiL
- Solomon Glass (1893–1973), American philatelist from Maryland
- Stephen Glass (born 1972), journalist
- Stephen Glass (footballer) (born 1976), Scottish footballer
- Tanner Glass (born 1983), Pittsburgh Penguins center
- Todd Glass (born 1964), American stand-up comedian
- Walter Glaß (1905–1981), German skier
- William Glass (1786–1853), British settler on Tristan da Cunha

== Fictional characters ==
- Glass family, a fictional family featured in a number of J. D. Salinger's short stories
