= Glas (surname) =

Glas is a Lowland Scottish, Dutch or Low German metonymic surname meaning "glass". It is also an Irish and Highland Scottish surname meaning "green". Notable people with the surname include:

- Arend Glas (born 1968), Dutch bobsledder
- Erich Glas (1897–1973), German-Israeli artist
- George Glas (1725–1765), Scottish mariner
- Gerrit Glas (born 1954), Dutch professor
- Gotthard Glas, birth name of Uziel Gal (1923–2002), German-born Israeli gun-designer
- Hanna Glas (born 1992), Swedish footballer
- Hans Glas (1890–1969), German entrepreneur who built cars with the brand Glas, which was bought by BMW.
- Imke Glas (born 1994), Dutch artistic gymnast
- John Glas (1695–1773), Scottish clergyman
- Jorge Glas (born 1969), Ecuadorian Vice President
- Jürgen Glas (born 1956), German swimmer
- Konrad Glas (1940–2016), German sailor
- Rich Glas (born 1948), American basketball coach
- Stéphane Glas (born 1973), French rugby player
- Tyko Gabriel Glas, fictional character in the Swedish novel Doctor Glas (1905)
- Uschi Glas (born 1944), German film and television actress

== See also ==
- Glasite, Scottish denomination founded by John Glas
- John S. Glas Field House, American hockey arena renamed in honour of John S. Glas
- George Glas Sandeman Carey (1867–1948), British army officer
- Seaán Glas mac Tadhg Riabhach Ó Dubhda (died c. 1471), Irish Chief of the Name and Lord of Tireragh
- An Giolla Glas Ó Caiside (fl. 1515–27), Gaelic-Irish physician and scribe
- Eochaid Faebar Glas, legendary High King of Ireland
