= Joseph Glass =

Joseph Glass may refer to:

- Joseph Glass (inventor) (1791–1867), English inventor of chimney-sweeping apparatus
- Joseph Glass (potter) (fl. 1670–1701), English potter
- Joseph Sarsfield Glass (1874–1926), American clergyman
