= National Chimney Sweep Guild =

American and Canadian non-profit trade association

- Formation: 1977; 49 years ago
- Type: 501(c)(6) Trade association
- Purpose: Safety, education, advocacy
- Headquarters: Ankeny, Iowa US
- Region served: North America
- Executive Director: Kailah Schmitz
- Main organ: Board of directors
- Website: ncsg.org

The National Chimney Sweep Guild (NCSG) is a non-profit trade association for chimney sweeps and chimney and venting manufacturers in the United States and Canada. Member companies range in size from the owner-operator sole proprietor chimney sweep companies to those with large service crews, and manufacturers with hundreds of employees. NCSG was founded in 1977 as a result of increased woodstove use due to the oil embargo crisis of the early to mid-1970s. Membership is open to any chimney-related company, including manufacturers, suppliers, distributors or service companies. The NCSG is governed by an elected board of directors made up of representatives from eight geographic regions within North America, one supplier representative and four at-large directors.

The guild tests members and provides continuing education for industry updates and best practices. A 1993 Kiplinger article claimed they do not certify chimney sweeps, however the guild offers certification with three credentials: Certified Chimney Reliner (CCR), Certified Chimney Professional (CCP) and Certified Chimney Journeyman (CCJ). The guild also advocates and lobbies for safety measures for chimney sweeps.
