= View-Master =

Trademark name of a line of special-format stereoscopes

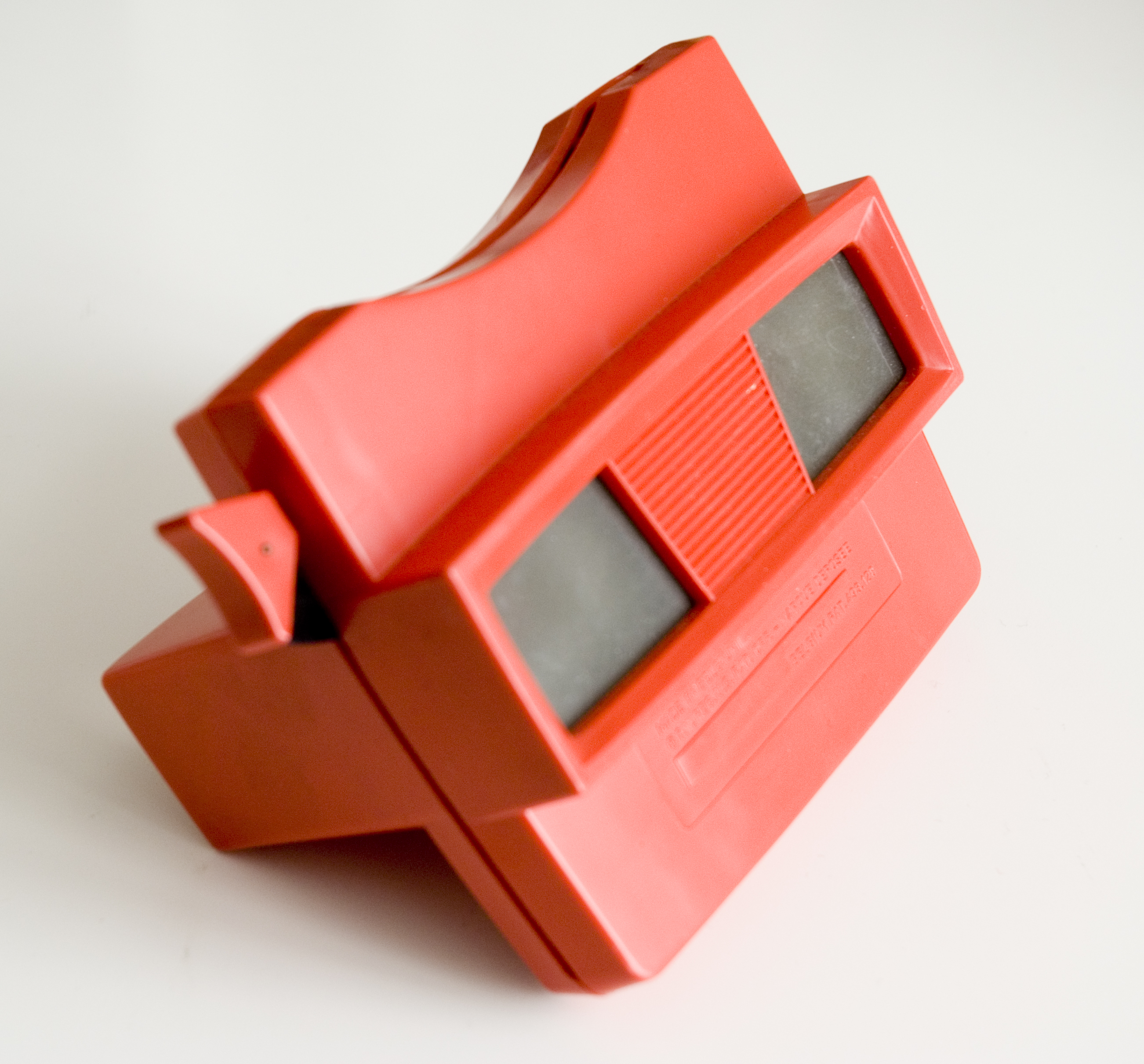
- A View-Master Model G, introduced in 1962
- Type: Stereoscope
- Invented by: William Gruber
- Company: Mattel
- Country: United States
- Availability: 1939–present

View-Master is the trademark name of a line of special-format stereoscopes and corresponding View-Master "reels", which are thin cardboard disks containing seven stereoscopic 3D pairs of small transparent color photographs on film. It was originally manufactured and sold by Sawyer's.

The View-Master system was introduced in 1939, four years after the advent of Kodachrome color film made the use of small, high-quality photographic color images practical. Tourist attraction and travel views predominated in View-Master's early lists of reels, most of which were meant to be of interest to users of all ages. Most current View-Master reels are intended for children.

There are over 4300 different View-Master reels.

== History ==
=== 1919–1956: early photo services ===
Edwin Eugene Mayer worked as a pharmacist at Owl Drug store in downtown Portland, Oregon, after serving in the U.S. Army in World War I. He built up a photo-finishing business there, and bought into Sawyer's Photo Finishing Service in 1919 with the help of his father August Mayer, his fiancée Eva McAnulty, and her sister Vi McAnulty.

Edwin described how he started the business in a letter dated April 1, 1954: "Suffice to say that in 1919, what little it was, was purchased with borrowed ($3,500) money from Dad, aided by about $1,600 in insurance money Eva got when her father died and which was left in permanently, and $1,600 borrowed from Vi and repaid, along with Dad's notes, within a few years."

As the business grew, Ed Mayer incorporated in about 1926, taking on partners Harold and Beulth F. Graves, Thomas and Pauline Meyer, and Augusta and Raymond F. Kelly, renaming the business Sawyer Service, Inc. The company relocated to a large two-story building at 181 Ella St., near Morrison Street in Portland, Oregon.

The company was producing photographic postcards and album sets as souvenirs by 1926, when Harold Graves joined Sawyer's. Graves handled marketing for the products while Mayer ran the business. Later, photographic greeting cards were added to the Sawyer's product line, marketed to major department stores. Sawyer's was the nation's largest producer of scenic postcards in the 1920s and the future View-Master viewer eventually became an extension of the two-dimensional cards.

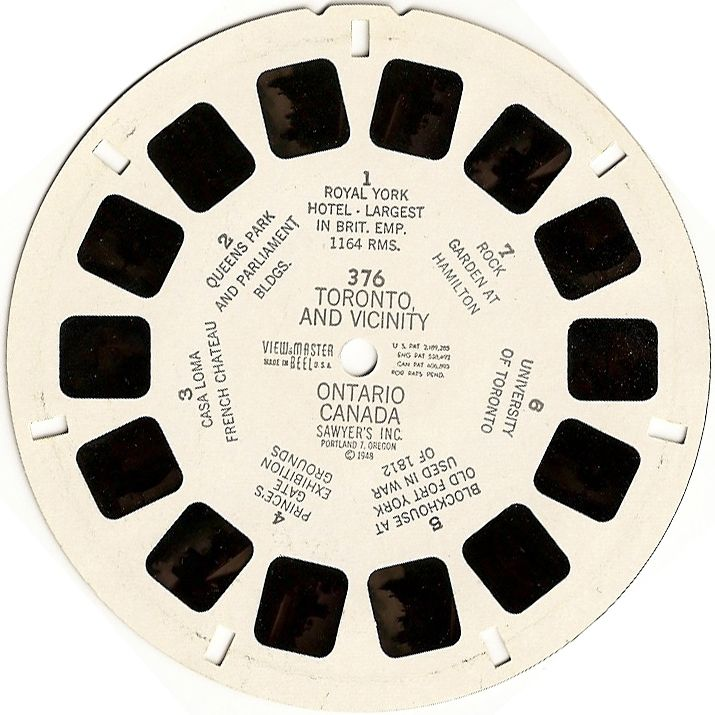
A View-Master reel from 1948

The company took the first steps towards developing the View-Master after Edwin Mayer and Graves met with William Gruber, a player-piano technician of German origin trained by Welte & Sons and an avid photographer living in Portland. Mayer and Gruber had both developed devices for viewing stereo images, but Gruber had made up a stereo imaging rig out of two Kodak Bantam Specials mounted together on a tripod. He designed a machine that mounted the tiny pieces of Kodachrome color transparency film into reels made from heavy paper stock used by the player pianos he serviced. A special viewer was also designed and produced. He had the idea of updating the old-fashioned stereoscope by using the new Kodachrome 16-mm color film, which had recently become available.

=== New business venture ===
A View-Master reel holds 14 film transparencies in seven pairs that create the seven stereoscopic images. The components of each pair are viewed simultaneously, one by each eye, thus simulating binocular depth perception.

According to a 1960 court document, the Gruber-Sawyer partner venture began from that first meeting in 1938. Thereafter, Ed Mayer negotiated with Gruber while production methods and some marketing were developed. A formal agreement was signed in February 1942 between Gruber and Sawyer partners, doing business as Sawyer's.

Mayer and people within the Sawyer's organization were uncertain about what to call the new product, but they eventually settled on the name of View-Master. The View-Master brand name eventually came to be recognized by 65% of the world's population, but Gruber disliked the name, believing that it sounded too much like Toast-Master, Mix-Master or some other kitchen appliance.

The View-Master was introduced at the 1939 New York World's Fair, marked "Patent Applied For". It was intended as an alternative to the scenic postcard, and was originally sold at photography shops, stationery stores and scenic-attraction gift shops. The main subjects of View-Master reels were Carlsbad Caverns and the Grand Canyon.

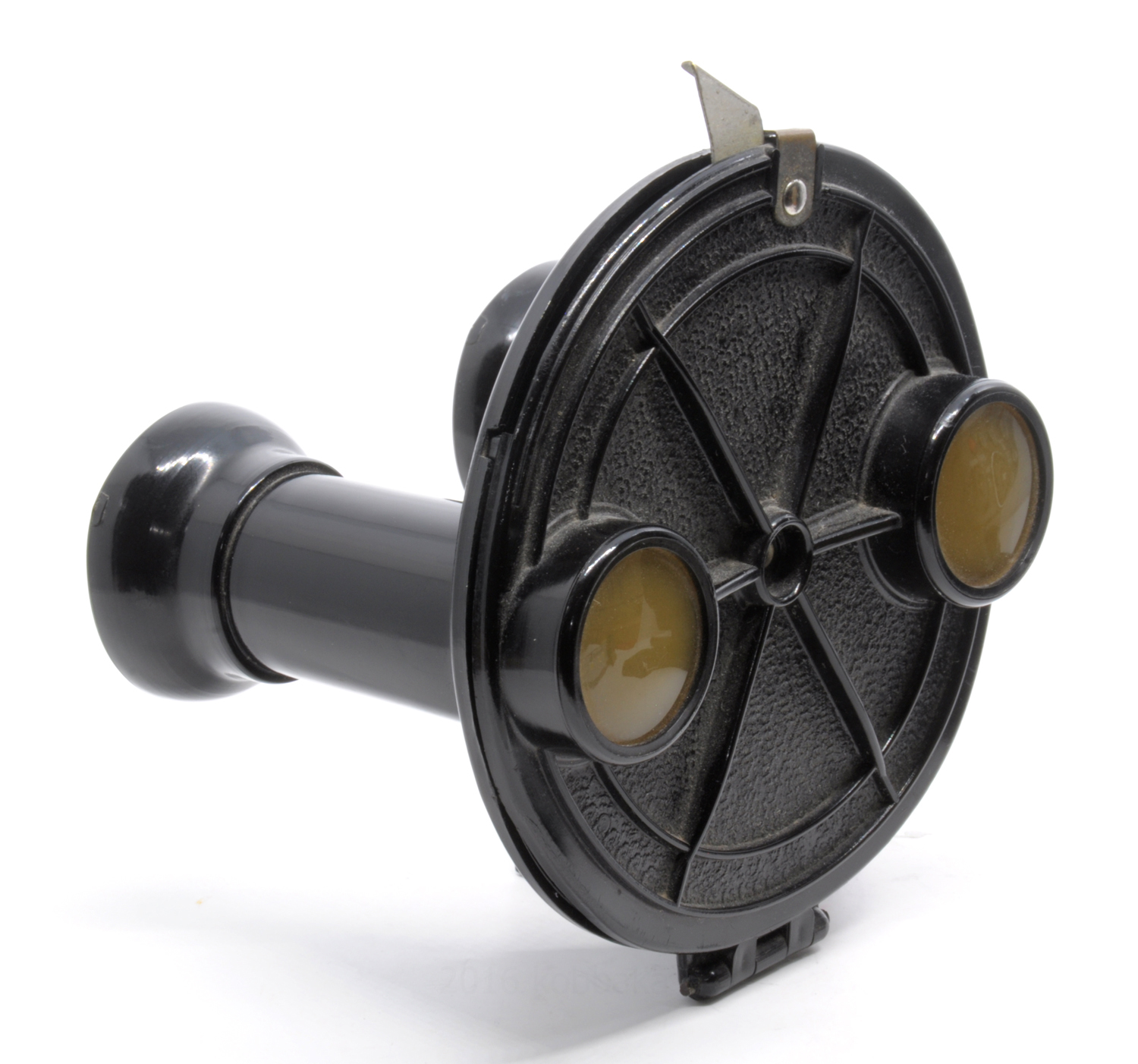
Model A

The View-Master was marketed through Mayer's photo-finishing, postcard and greeting card company Sawyer's Service, Inc., known eventually as Sawyer's, Inc. The partnership led to the retail sales of View-Master viewers and reels. The patent for the viewing device was issued in 1940, and this original model came to be called the Model A viewer. Within a very short time, the View-Master supplanted the postcard business at Sawyer's.

=== Expansion ===
Mayer gave details of the company's expansion in a letter dated April 1, 1954:

In 1939, 20 years after starting the business, we had, by dint of hard work and long hours and frugal living, accumulated a business (Sawyer's) worth about $58,000.00 and Western Photo Supply Co. owning the buildings, worth about $30,000.00. The above figures were for the total business and buildings owned by the Kellys, Graves, Mayers and Meyers. In 1946, we had already grown a lot from 1939, and Sawyer's made a lease with Western Photo Supply Co., they to build and lease two new buildings to Sawyer's, in addition to the two we already had. At this point, Sawyer's also decided to change its structure from a partnership to a corporation, for various good reasons, one of which was to permit our children to participate in the stock ownership.

In the 1940s, the United States military recognized the potential for View-Master products for personnel training, purchasing 100,000 viewers and nearly six million reels from 1942 to the end of World War II in 1945.

After the development of the View-Master, Sawyer's, Inc. moved into a new building at 735 S.W. 20th Place in downtown Portland. The company also occupied a building next door at 740 S.W. 21st Avenue. In 1951, Mayer and his Sawyer's partners built a large plant in Washington County, Oregon. After moving to the new plant, Mayer leased the building on 20th Place to Oregon Television, Inc.

=== 1950s ===
In 1951, Sawyer's purchased Tru-Vue, the main competitor of View-Master. The takeover included Tru-Vue's licensing rights to Walt Disney Studios properties. Sawyer's capitalized on the opportunity and produced numerous reels featuring Disney characters. In 1955, reels of the newly opened Disneyland were produced.

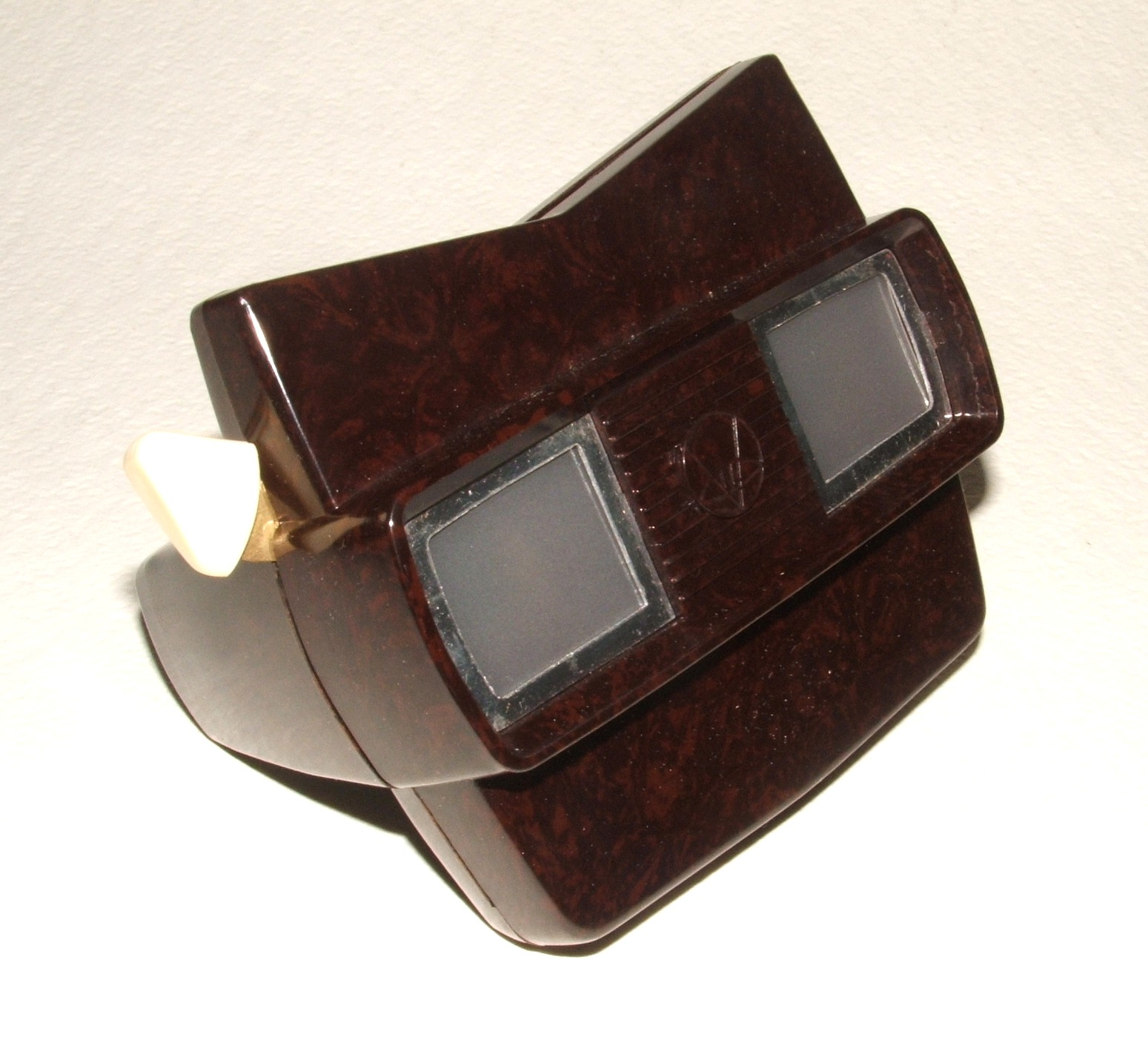
A View-Master Model E of the 1950s

Joe Liptak was the artist responsible for most of the Disney and the early Hanna-Barbera reels.

In 1952, Sawyer's began its View-Master Personal line, which included the View-Master Personal Stereo Camera for users to make their own View-Master reels. It was successful at first, but the line was discontinued in ten years. This line spawned the Model D viewer, View-Master's highest-quality viewer, which was available until the early 1970s, and the Stereomatic 500, View-Master's only 3D projector. The other projectors were 2D and used only one of the images.

The Model E was introduced in 1955 with a more modern design, large ivory buttons on the picture-changer levers and a large "V" slot on top for easier reel insertion. It was released in brown and black in the United States, and some other colors elsewhere. It was about four inches high, five inches wide and four inches deep.

The Model F was introduced in 1958. It used C-cell batteries to power an internal lighting source. Industrial designer Chuck Harrison led the team designing the Model F View-Master.

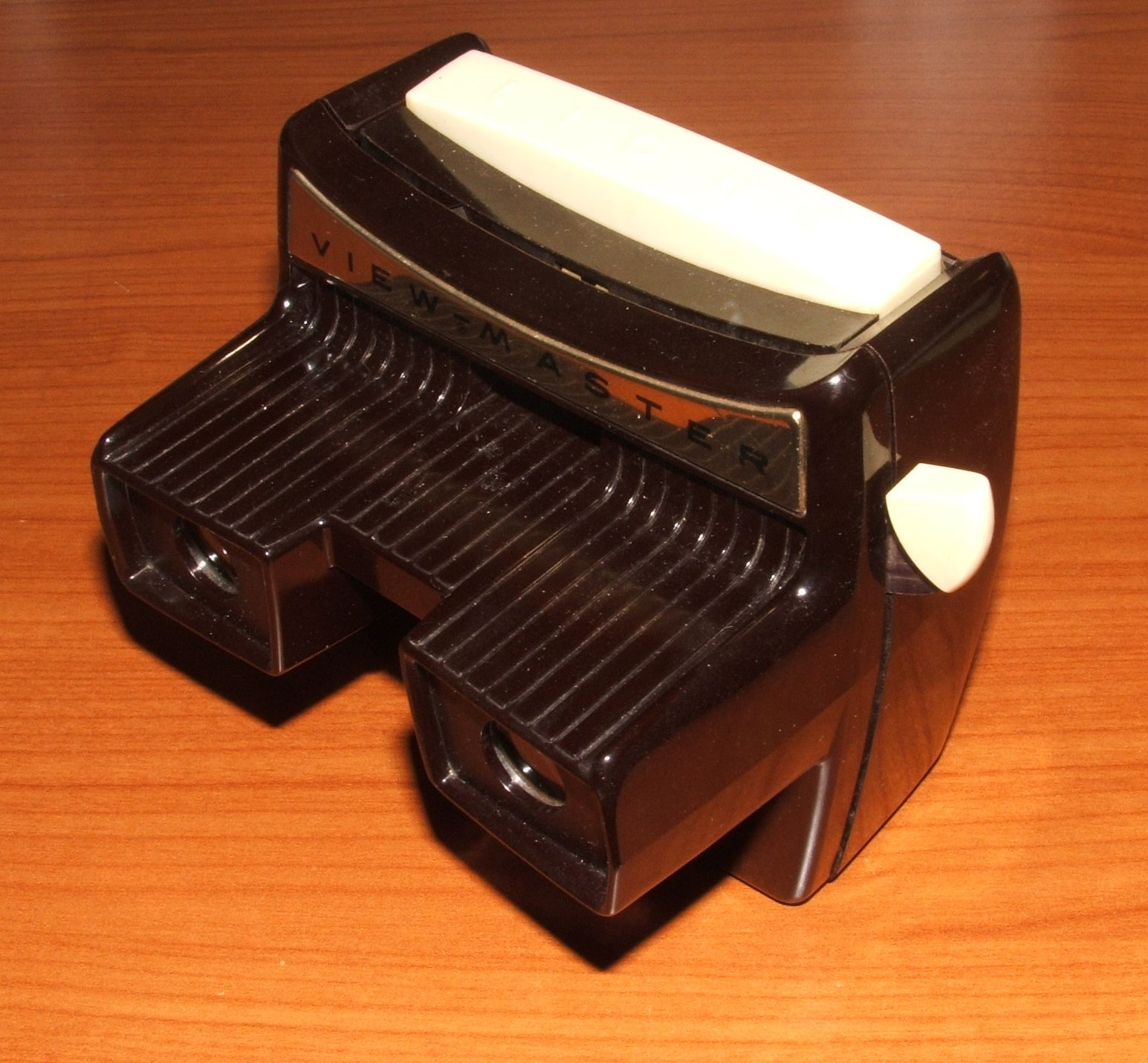
View-Master Model F

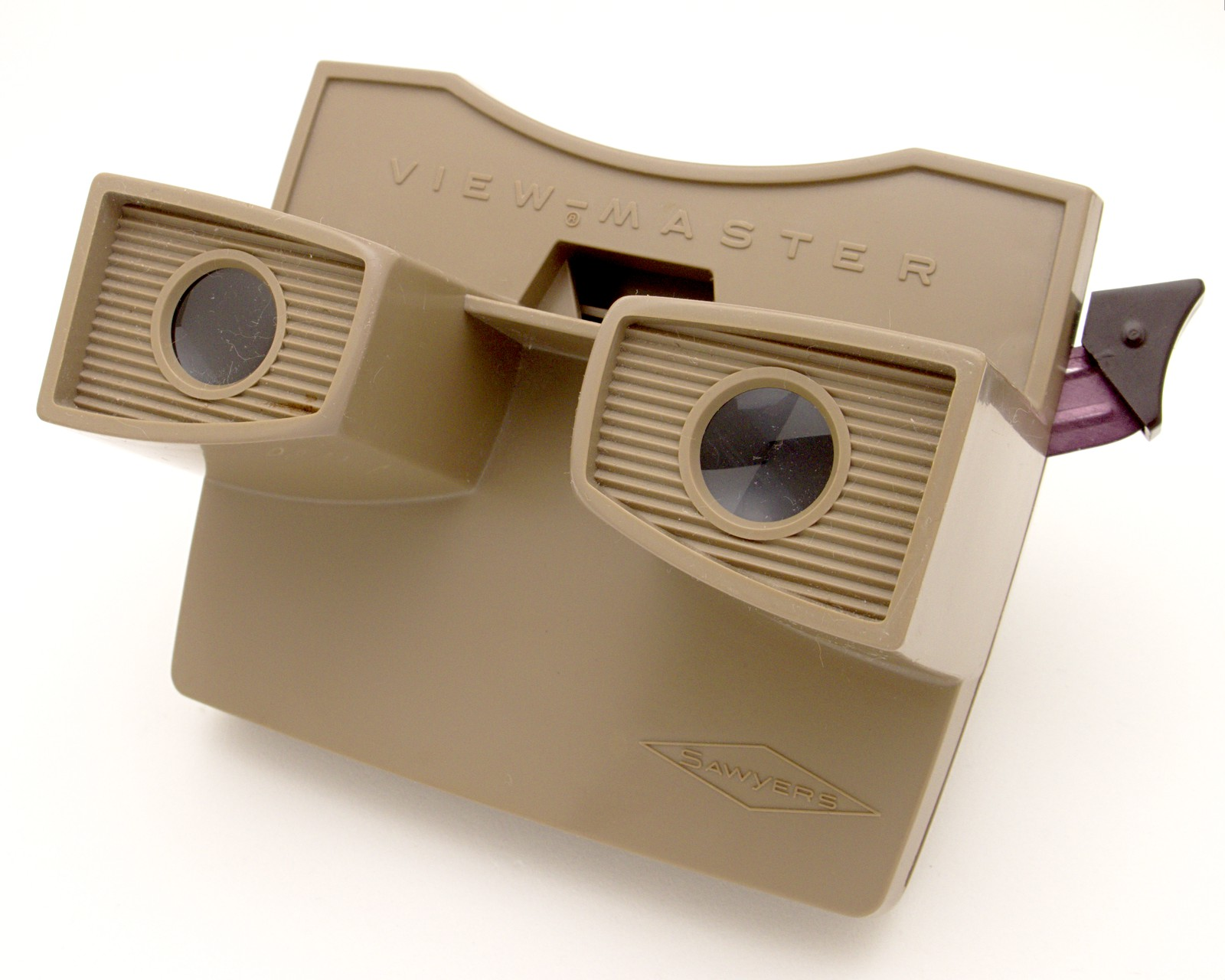
A model G View-Master viewer from the last years of the Sawyer's era

=== 1962–present: stereoscopic toy ===
The View-Master had been originally constructed from Kodak Tenite plastic and then Bakelite, a hard, sturdy, somewhat heavy plastic. In 1962, lighter thermoplastic versions were introduced, beginning with the Model G, a change driven by Sawyer's president Bob Brost.

In 1966, Sawyer's was acquired by the General Aniline & Film (GAF) Corporation and became a wholly owned subsidiary. Under GAF's ownership, View-Master reels began to feature fewer scenic and more child-friendly subjects, such as toys and cartoons. Television series were featured on View-Master reels, such as Doctor Who (sold only in the U.K.), Rowan & Martin's Laugh-In, Star Trek, The Man from U.N.C.L.E., Family Affair, Here's Lucy and The Beverly Hillbillies. Actor Henry Fonda appeared in a series of TV commercials for the GAF View-Master.

From 1970 to around 1997, GAF produced the Talking View-Master, which included audio technology along with the reels. Three major designs were produced, with increasing sophistication. In the early 1970s, GAF introduced the View-Master Rear Screen Projector, a tabletop projector that displayed images from picture wheels.

In 1980, View-Master released the Show Beam Projector, a toy that combined the company's stereoscopic images and flashlight technology to produce a portable handheld projector. The Show Beam used small film cartridges that were plugged into the side of the toy. Each cartridge contained 30 full-color 2D images.

In 1981, GAF sold View-Master to a group of investors headed by Arnold Thaler, and the company was reconstituted as the View-Master International Group.

In 1985, View-Master Video was introduced. Through a partnership with Warner Bros. Records, a live-action educational video series was produced by Together Again Productions and titled Kidsongs, designed for the educational market.

View-Master International acquired the Ideal Toy Company in 1984 and became known as the View-Master Ideal Group, and the combined company was purchased by Tyco Toys in 1989. Tyco, including the View-Master Ideal Group, merged with Mattel in 1997. View-Master was assigned to Mattel's preschool division and is now marketed under the Fisher-Price imprint, with a continued emphasis on children's content.

In 1998, during the purchase of the Tyco-owned plant by Mattel, the EPA investigated the View-Master factory supply well for the toxic chemical trichloroethylene (TCE). The plant was closed in 2001.

In December 2008, Mattel ceased production of the scenic reels depicting tourist attractions that were descendants of the first View-Master reels sold in 1939. However, Mattel continued to produce reels featuring animated characters.

=== 2015–2019: Virtual reality ===
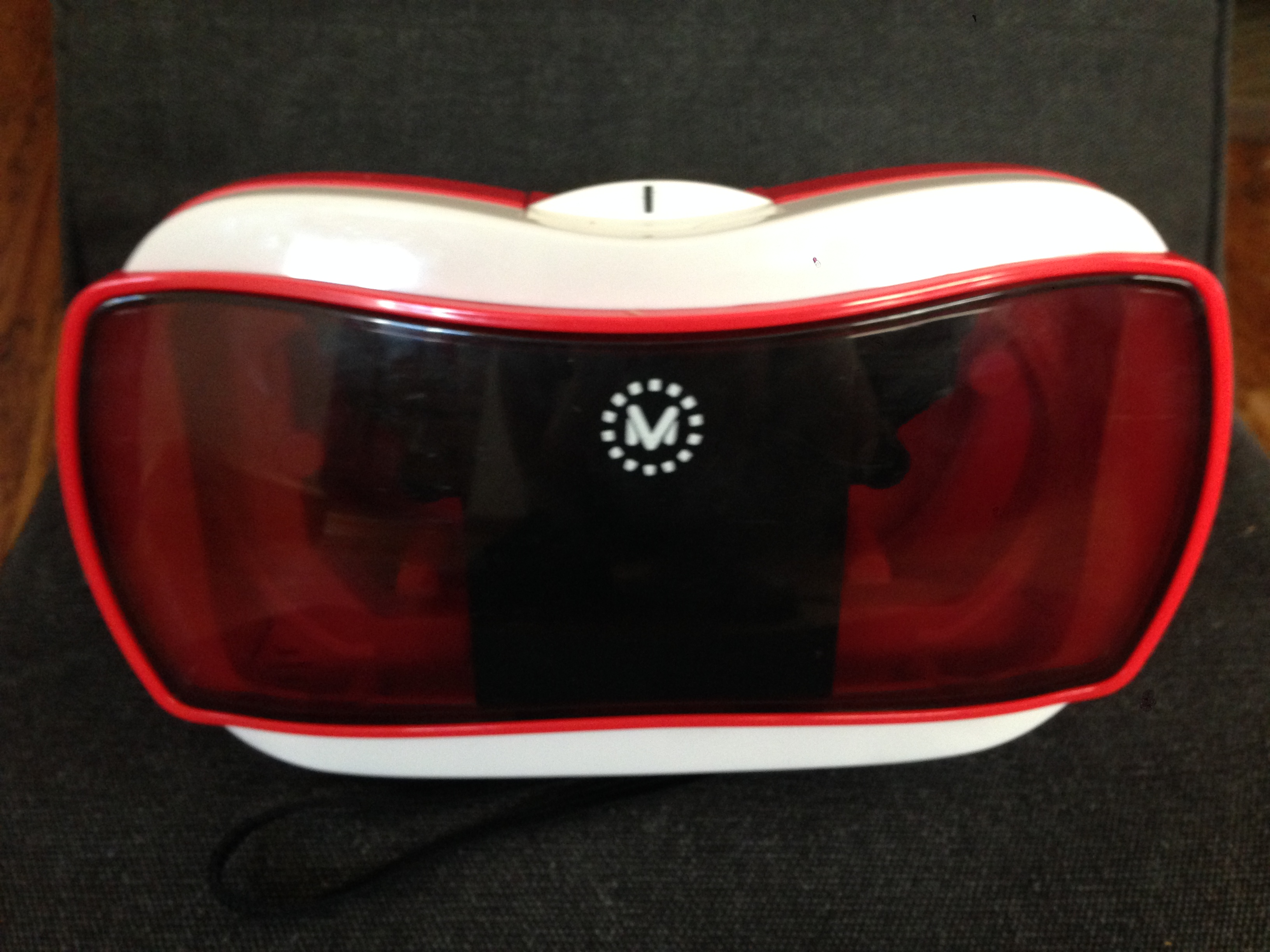
View-Master VR set

In February 2015, Mattel announced a collaboration with Google to produce a new version of the View-Master called the View-Master Virtual Reality Viewer, based on virtual reality using smartphones. The new View-Master is an implementation of the Google Cardboard VR platform and is accompanied by a mobile app built using its SDK. Content is displayed on a smartphone screen; the phone itself is inserted into the back of the unit. Instead of being inserted directly into the View-Master, reels are scanned using an augmented reality interface that enables access to content from the reel, such as 360-degree panoramas, 3D models and minigames.

In 2016, an updated iteration known as the DLX was released; it features improvements to its compatibility with smaller phones, a more secure latch for the phone compartment, and also adds focal adjustment and a headphone port.

Both editions of the View-Master VR were discontinued in November 2019, and the Experience packs can no longer be installed by new users.

=== Cumulative production ===
There have been some 25 viewer models, thousands of titles, and 1.5 billion reels produced. The basic design remained the same for reels and internal mechanisms, despite its long history and many changes in models and materials, ensuring that every reel will work in every model.

== Recognition ==
In 1999, View-Master was part of the second year of inductees added to the National Toy Hall of Fame.

The View-Master is in The Strong National Museum of Play, The Henry Ford museum in Dearborn, Smithsonian National Museum of American History, Denver Art Museum, Museum of Modern Art (MoMA) in New York, amongst other collections.

In 2025, the Chuck Harrison designed models from the early 1960s were included in Pirouette: Turning Points in Design, an exhibition at MoMA featuring "widely recognized design icons [...] highlighting pivotal moments in design history."

== Notable uses ==
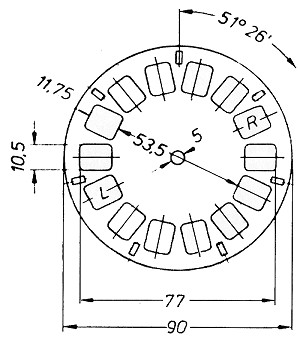
Specifications for View-Master reels

Reels have been produced for Disneyland, many TV shows (such as The Flying Nun, Lost in Space, and The Munsters), blockbuster movies (such as The Poseidon Adventure, E.T. the Extra-Terrestrial, and Jurassic Park), and the U.S. military (for airplane and ship identification as well as range estimation).

David L. Bassett, an expert on anatomy and dissection, collaborated with Gruber to create a 25-volume atlas of human anatomy using the View-Master system.

View-Master produced custom reels for commercial customers to show 3D images of products and services to potential clients. For example, in the early 1990s, Canadian restaurant chain East Side Mario's used a View-Master reel as their dessert menu.

Among the newest View-Master products are a Discovery Channel View-Master, the new Virtual Viewer, the Discovery Channel View-Master Projector and Telescope, and the View-Master 3-D Pocket Viewer, which feature images of popular performers in concert and backstage.

== Film ==
In 2009, DreamWorks Pictures had entered talks to develop a feature film based on the View-Master with Alex Kurtzman and Roberto Orci to produce. The screenplay would be written by Brad Caleb Kane, who described the film as in the vein of "old '80s Amblin movies" in a now-deleted tweet. No further development was reported on this utilization.

In 2019, Mattel partnered with MGM to announce a new version of the film based on the View-Master. The project will be co-piloted by Robbie Brenner of Mattel's Films division and MGM's Cassidy Lange. In 2024, it was announced that the film moved to Sony Pictures with Escape Artists producing. One year later, Phil Johnston became attached to write.

== See also ==
- Slide viewer
- Virtual reality
  - Google Cardboard
