= Joseph Glass (inventor) =

English philanthropist and inventor

Joseph Glass (1791/2 – 29 December 1867) was the inventor of a successful chimney-sweeping apparatus, and a campaigner against boys being employed in sweeping chimneys.

== Life ==
He was born in Colchester, in Essex, England; after early years in Manningtree, he moved to London, working as a builder. By the 1820s he had a chimney-sweeping business.

During this period there was a movement to prevent boys being employed in cleaning chimneys. The Society for Superseding the Necessity of Climbing Boys (SSNCB) was founded in 1803 under the patronage of the Duchess of Gloucester. The SSNCB and the Royal Society for the Encouragement of Arts, Manufactures and Commerce promoted a competition for an effective apparatus for cleaning chimneys. Several systems were invented; one invented by George Smart was awarded a gold medal by the Society of Arts in 1805. However it had little effect on the campaign.

Glass invented an apparatus in which cane rods were connected with brass screw joints, creating a flexible rod which coped with bends in the chimney. A wheel was fixed to the top of the stock, to prevent jamming.

Glass's system, introduced in 1828, was considered superior to Smart's apparatus. It was approved by the SSNCB, and from 1829 the Home Secretary Robert Peel ordered the apparatus to be used in government offices. In 1834 there was a committee of the House of Lords to which Glass gave evidence, resulting in the Chimney Sweepers Act 1834.

He did not patent his invention. He was active in the campaign against the employment of "climbing boys", prosecuting those who tried to evade the provisions of the Act. Since many sweeps still employed boys, there were further Acts of Parliament: the Chimney Sweepers and Chimneys Regulation Act 1840 and the Chimney Sweepers Regulation Act 1864.

Glass died at his home in Brixton on 29 December 1867, in his seventy-sixth year; his death was noticed in the Court Circular, since Queen Victoria was interested in the campaign. His son Henry became a newspaper editor, and another son Joseph became a Congregational minister.

== Cited sources ==
- Cullingford, Benita (2001). British Chimney Sweeps: Five Centuries of Chimney Sweeping. Rowman & Littlefield. ISBN 9781566633451.
