= Glassy =

Glassy is an adjective meaning, of or resembling glass. Glassy may also mean:

- Glassy, amorphous metal
- Glassy (single album), a 2021 single album, or the title song by Jo Yuri
- Glassy phase, amorphous solid
- Glassy water, amorphous ice
- Glassy carbon, carbon with a shiny surface
- Glassy surface, a smooth surface

== See also ==
- Sea glass
- SeaGlass Carousel
- Glass (disambiguation)
