= Glas (TV channel) =

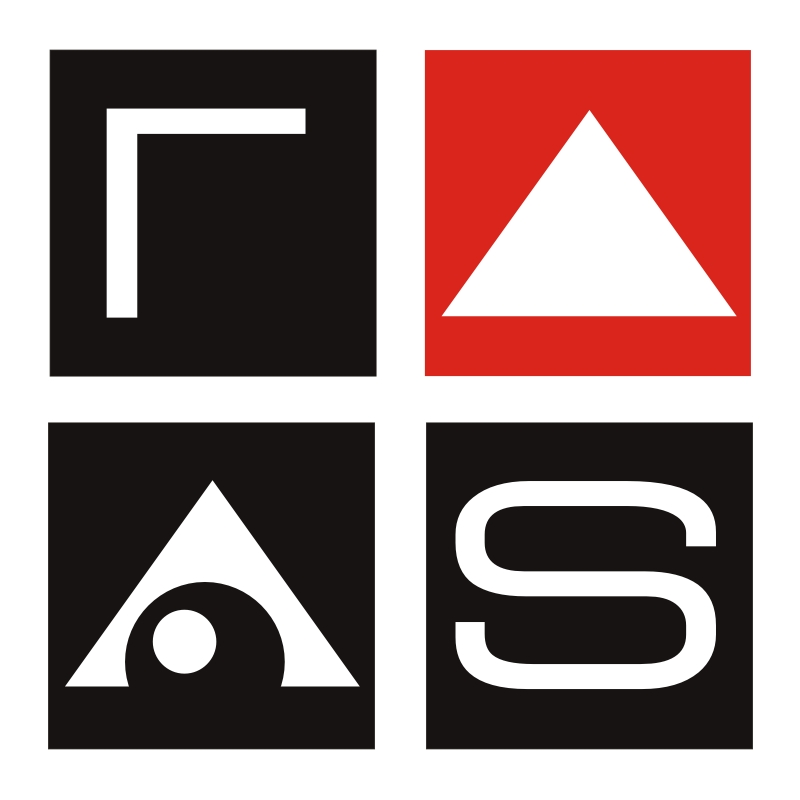
- GLAS TV&Radio Broadcasting logo

Programming
- Picture format: 4:3 (576i, SDTV)

History
- Launched: 2005
- Closed: 2022

Links
- Website: http://glas.org.ua

Glas (Ukrainian: Глас) was a Ukrainian satellite TV channel. Glas broadcast humanistic, creative, educative programs, based on high ethical principles.

Glas was aimed at an audience of all ages. Most viewers are active, independent people, interested in the history of culture, world and national heritage. The channel exclusively broadcasts original programs of its own production, and stays out of politics. There was no advertisement on the channel. Launched on 26 March 2005 and closed on 1 June 2022.

== Slogan ==
Colors of Your World

== Broadcasting ==
Glas broadcast its programs via satellite «Sirius 4», which covers the territory of Europe, Middle East and Russia — to Novosibirsk, Nizhnevartovsk and Vorkuta with total audience 1.2 billion people. Satellite broadcasting of 2-hour blocs also provided via satellite «HELLAS SAT 4» (Europe and Asia) and satellite «Intelsat 3R» (North America) with total audience 980 million people by state company «International branch of Ukrainian Television and Radio». In Ukraine Glas is relayed by 150 cable companies and almost 100 aerial companies.

== Achievements and awards ==
Many programs of the channel gained prizes of international film festivals and state awards. Among them are Gran Prix of International Film Festival «Pokrov», International Festival of Christian Films, prizes of International Festival of Documentary Films «Kinolitopys», «Zolotyj Georgij», Film Festival «Radonezh», International Orthodox Film Festival «Zustrich» and «Crux of Saint Andrij». Channel is awarded by honorary diploma of Ukrainian Government and awards of Ukrainian Orthodox Church. In collaboration with Foreign Ministry, TV-Channel Glas creates presentational films about Ukraine.

== Technical capacities ==
Glas was equipped by modern digital equipment. Studio of virtual reality gives an opportunity to implement new visual means and create programs real-time with post-production. Currently, technology of virtual reality is used in production of commercials, music clips, documentaries and feature films. Such studios save expenses on manufacturing and assembling of decorations, outdoor shootings, and permanent refitting of studios.

== Programs, produced by Glas ==
Cognitive and entertainment programs for kids and youth:

- Cone Forest
- Good Word
- Reserved Ukraine
- Miracles of the Universe
- Art of Building
- How and Why
- My Pet
- My Profession

Documentary and educational films

- Heritage
- Portrait
- Craftsman

Informational

- Chronicle
- Orthodox World
- Weather in Orthodox World
- Weather in Ukraine

Religious and Educational

- Life of Saints
- Way to Sanctity
- Testimonies of Soul
- Pages of the Testaments
- Ways of Virtues

== See also ==
- List of Ukrainian language television channels
