= Glasse =

Glasse is a surname. Notable people with the surname include:

- Fred Glasse (1889–1977), New Zealand engineer and local politician
- George Glasse (1761–1809), English chaplain and Fellow of the Royal Society
- Hannah Glasse (1708–1770), English cookery writer

== See also ==
- Glass (surname)
- Glass, archaically spelled "glasse"
