= River Glass =

River Glass may refer to:

- River Glass, Isle of Man, a tributary of the River Dhoo
- River Glass, Strathglass, a tributary of the River Beauly, Scotland
- Allt Graad or River Glass, which flows from Loch Glass to the Cromarty Firth in Scotland
