= Dumke =

Dumke is a surname. Notable people with the surname include:

- Glenn Dumke (1917–1989), American historian
- Klaus Dumke (born 1941), German fencer
- Lusanda Dumke (1996–2025), South African rugby union player
- Otto Dumke (1887–1912), German footballer
- Ralph Dumke (1899–1964), American actor

== See also ==
- Dr. Ezekiel R. Dumke College of Health Professions, part of Weber State University
