= List of islands called Eilean Glas =

Eilean Glas means Green Island in Gaelic.

There are many islands in Scotland called Eilean Glas. They include:

- Eilean Glas, Scalpay in the Outer Hebrides.
- Eilean Glas within Loch Crinan
- Eilean Glas within Loch Dunvegan
- Eilean Glas within Loch Fyne
- Eilean Glas within Loch Scavaig

There are also a number of islands named 'Glas Eilean' such as:

- Glas Eilean in Loch Alsh
- Glas Eilean within Loch Sunart (outer)
- Glas Eilean within Loch Sunart (inner)
