= Glacé =

Glacé can mean

- Candied fruit, alternately glacé fruit
- Roze koek, of which glacé or glace is a registered brand name in some countries
- The Frozen Dead, 2017 French TV series and its source novel, both also known as Glacé
