= George Smart (inventor) =

George Smart (1757/8–1834) was a British inventor, known for the invention of a device to clean chimneys, called the "scandiscope". He was awarded the Royal Society of Arts gold medal in 1805 for his invention, due to its potential for stopping the practice of making small children climb inside chimneys to clean them.
