= Charles "Chuck" Harrison =

American industrial designer

- Born: 23 September 1931; Shreveport
- Died: 29 November 2018 (aged 87)
- Occupation: Industrial designer

Charles "Chuck" Harrison (September 23, 1931 – November 29, 2018) was an American industrial designer, speaker and educator. He was the first African-American executive to work at Sears, Roebuck and Company, starting in 1961 as a designer and eventually becoming manager of the company's entire design group. He was involved in the design of over 750 consumer products, including the portable hair dryer, toasters, stereos, lawn mowers, sewing machines, Craftsman power tools, the see-through measuring cup, fondue pots, stoves, and the first plastic trash can, which has been credited with changing the sound of trash collection day. Perhaps his most famous achievement was leading the team that updated the View-Master in 1958, designing the classic Model F View-Master.

== Early life ==
Harrison was born in Shreveport, Louisiana, in 1931. At the time of his birth, his father, Charles Harrison Sr., was teaching industrial arts at Southern University in Louisiana. In 1936, the family moved to Texas where Harrison Sr. become a professor at Prairie View A&M University. Both Harrison Sr. and Harrison's maternal grandfather were carpenters, and Harrison credits his interest and ability in design to their influence.

In 1945, the family moved to Phoenix, Arizona where Harrison attended George Washington Carver High School, an all-black high school. The school closed when integration became law in the 1950s, and is now a museum and cultural center celebrating the contributions of African-Americans; a room in the museum is dedicated to Harrison's work.

Harrison was active in extracurricular activities at the high school, playing basketball and tennis, and participating in the band and chorus.

== Education ==
Harrison attended the School of the Art Institute of Chicago (SAIC) from 1949 to 1954, earning a Bachelor of Fine Arts. One of his undergraduate professors, Henry P. Glass, would prove to be one of Harrison's greatest mentors and allies over the course of his career. It was also while attending SAIC that Harrison met his future wife.

In 1956, he returned to the school to pursue graduate studies, transferring later to the Illinois Institute of Technology to complete his Master's in Art Education. He received his Master of Science in Art Education from the Institute of Design in 1963.

Harrison was dyslexic.

== Career ==
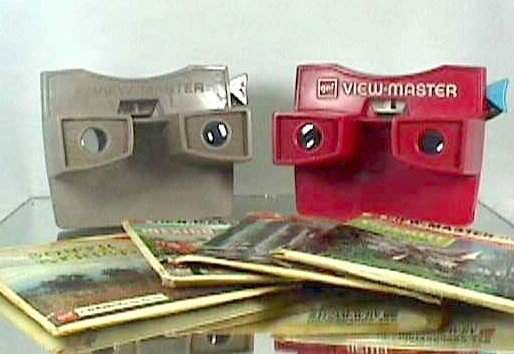
View-Master Model G & Disk

Between his undergraduate and graduate degrees, Harrison was drafted into the United States Army and posted to Germany. He served two years in the topography unit doing spot mapping and drafting.

Back in the U.S., fresh out of school, Harrison began looking for work with a design firm. He interviewed at Sears but was told that he could not be hired on staff because he was black. The hiring manager liked Harrison's work, however, and was able to feed him freelance work from Sears on the side. But it was Henry Glass, one of Harrison's undergraduate professors, who gave him his first job with a design firm, putting him to work on furniture designs. Harrison credits Glass with teaching him a great deal about detailing, drawing, and production, as well as the business elements of the trade, such as client relations.

Over the next several years, Harrison worked for Ed Klein & Associates and Robert Podall Associates. It was at Robert Podall Associates in 1958 that Harrison updated the popular View-Master toy before getting a call from his old contact at Sears. Sears was ready to offer him a job. It was 1961, and Harrison became the first African-American executive ever hired at the company's Chicago headquarters. Harrison worked for Sears until his retirement in 1993.

After retirement, Harrison taught part-time at the University of Illinois at Chicago, School of the Art Institute of Chicago, and at Columbia College Chicago.

== Awards and Exhibitions ==
In 2009, Harrison was awarded an honorary doctorate from the School of the Art Institute of Chicago.

In October 2008, he was awarded the Lifetime Achievement National Design Award by Cooper-Hewitt, National Design Museum, Smithsonian Institution. He is the first African-American to receive this accolade.

In 2007, his work was featured alongside other African-American product designers at the Designs for Life: Black Creativity 2007 exhibit at the Museum of Science and Industry (Chicago)

In 2006 he was awarded Focus on DESIGN's Lifetime Achievement Award. In September 2006, he was also awarded the Industrial Designers Society of America's Lifetime Distinguished Service Award. In the same year, his memoir, A Life's Design: The Life and Work of Industrial Designer Charles Harrison (ISBN 0-9773271-0-8), was published by Ibis Design.

In 2000, Harrison's work was featured in an exhibit titled "The World of a Product Designer: Charles Harrison" at the Carver Museum and Cultural Center.

In 2025, Harrison's View-Master designs were included as part of an interactive exhibit in Pirouette: Turning Points in Design, at the Museum of Modern Art. The exhibition features "widely recognized design icons [...] highlighting pivotal moments in design history."

== Death ==
Harrison died at age 87 on November 29, 2018.
