= View-Master factory supply well =

Coordinates: 45.456541°N 122.786765°W

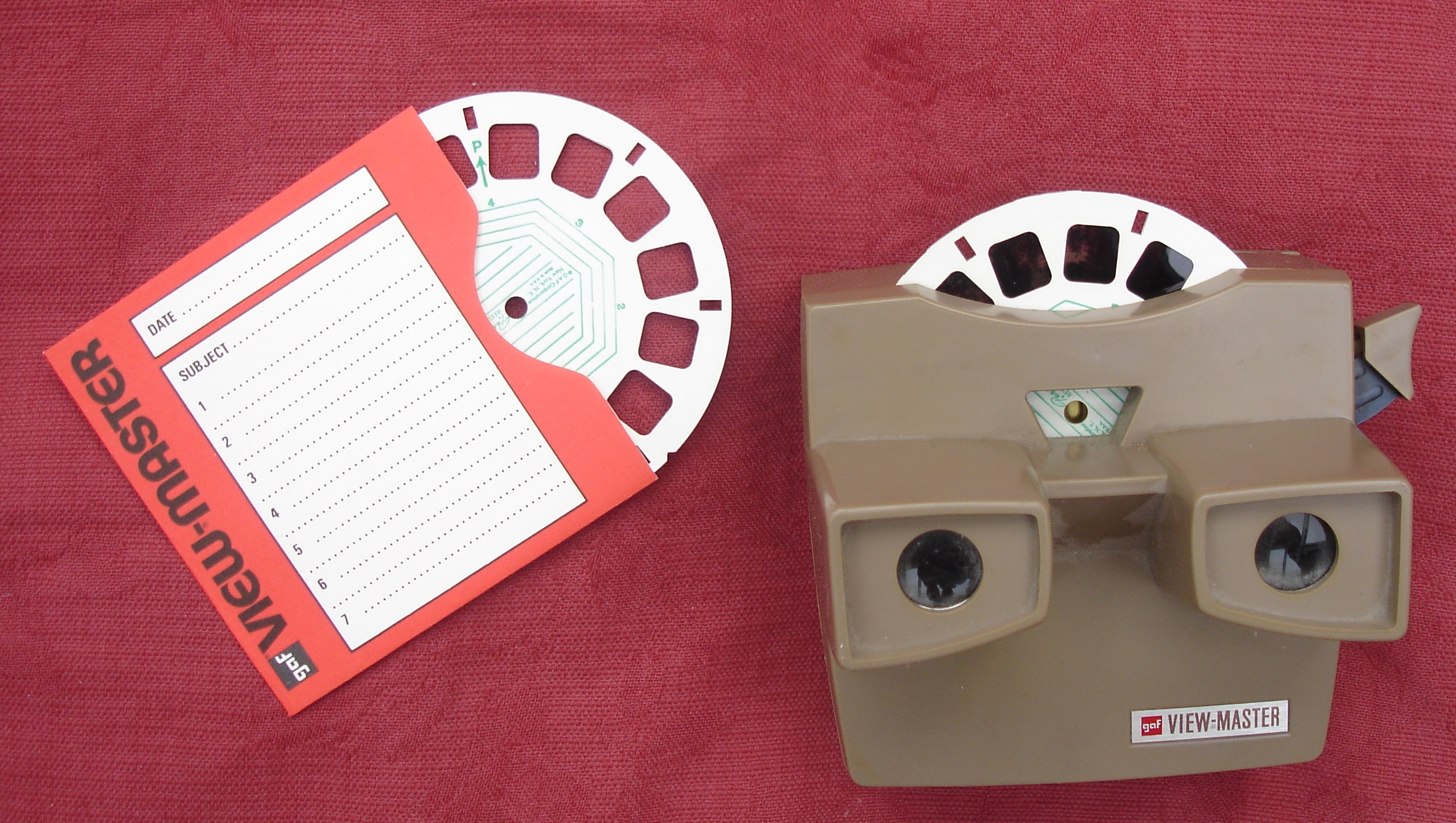
View-Master and discs produced at the plant

The View-Master factory supply well in Beaverton, Oregon, was evaluated for public health effects by the Oregon Department of Human Services (ODHS) under a cooperative agreement with the Agency for Toxic Substances and Disease Registry (ATSDR). Workers there were potentially exposed to the industrial solvent trichloroethylene (TCE), classified by the International Agency for Research on Cancer (IARC) as a probable human carcinogen. At the factory, which closed in 2001, it had been estimated by ODHS that up to 25,000 workers may have been exposed to TCE via the factory's drinking water, which was drawn from a well on-site. However, further investigation showed that the actual number of employees who can be identified from employment records for the site is approximately half that number. In addition, the number of employees identified as having worked at the site for more than five years is likely to be less than 1,000. The site is now considered safe.

== History ==
The View-Master, a device for viewing 3D images (also known as stereoscopic images) on a paper disk, was invented in 1939 by William Gruber, a Portland, Oregon, photographer. A business arrangement was made, and the devices came to be manufactured by Sawyer's, Inc. In 1951, Sawyer's opened a factory in Progress, Oregon (now part of Beaverton), to manufacture the devices. The devices were manufactured at the factory in Beaverton until 2001, when production was shifted elsewhere and portions of the factory sold.

In 1998, a prospective site developer hired an environmental engineering firm to perform an environmental assessment of the site. This assessment discovered volatile organic compounds well above the levels specified by the United States Environmental Protection Agency (U.S. EPA). This included levels of TCE which were over 300 times the federal drinking water standard. The various concerns who owned the View-Master franchise in the 1950s through the 1970s (Sawyer's and GAF), acknowledged using TCE to clean and de-grease parts and equipment, and disposed of the chemical on-site. This disposal was legal at the time.

IARC classified TCE as “probably carcinogenic to humans”. As of October 2009, the U.S. EPA is evaluating the carcinogenic and non-carcinogenic human health risks from exposure to TCE.

Certain uses of TCE were banned in 1977 in the United States. However, TCE was still used in household products such as spot removers and typewriter correction fluid well into the 1990s.

== Medical impact ==
The ODHS has estimated that up to 25,000 workers may have been exposed to this chemical. However, based on employment records for the site, subsequent reports estimate the number at approximately 13,700. A more recent report which evaluated the completeness of the employment records concluded that the number of employees with over five years of employment is likely to be less than 1,000. According to a study performed by the ODHS, among former factory workers, the number of deaths from several types of cancer was elevated. However, for several other types of cancer, the number of deaths was lower than expected. ODHS concluded that there was no overall increase in cancer mortality among the workers, but that further study was warranted.

== Conclusion ==
By September 2004, surface soil and surface water levels of TCE and other chemicals were within normal levels. As a result, the site has been deemed suitable for commercial re-use, and a shopping plaza was constructed. That plaza is now supplied by Portland's city water and does not use water from the former well, which along with its water tower was demolished in 2005.

The ODHS has recommended that the health of the workers at the former factory be evaluated to determine the extent to which this population may have been affected by potential exposure to TCE.

== See also ==
- List of Superfund sites in Oregon. The View-Master site was never declared a Superfund site. Cleanup actions at the View-Master plant are being administered by the Oregon Department of Environmental Quality (ODEQ).
- Hall Street Associates, L.L.C. v. Mattel, Inc.
