= Imke Glas =

Dutch artistic gymnast

- Full name: Imke Glas
- Born: 30 August 1994 (age 32) Broek op Langedijk, Netherlands

Gymnastics career
- Discipline: Women's artistic gymnastics
- Country represented: Netherlands
- Gym: BATO Haarlem
- Head coach: Katarina Sarisska

Imke Glas (born 30 August 1994) is a Dutch artistic gymnast.

== Personal life ==
Glas was born on 30 August 1994 in Broek op Langedijk, Netherlands. She has two siblings.

== Gymnastics career ==
Glas began gymnastics at the age of three when her parents took her to a local gym, BSV / ODIS. Glas was one of the most promising junior elite gymnasts on the Dutch Junior National Team and was a contender to compete at the 2008 European Junior Gymnastic Championships. However, on 26 October 2007 she was severely injured in an accident on vault.

While in training, Glas was performing a round-off half-on, a variation of the Yurchenko type vault, when her hands missed the vault table and she fell on her head. She severely damaged her sixth and seventh cervical vertebrae, warranting extensive surgery in which neurosurgeons took a piece of her hip bone and placed it in her neck for stabilization. Glas and her family were told that she would never walk again, but she made a full recovery and was able to return to participating in gymnastics at a lower level.
