= Glassing =

Attack using a glass or bottle as a weapon

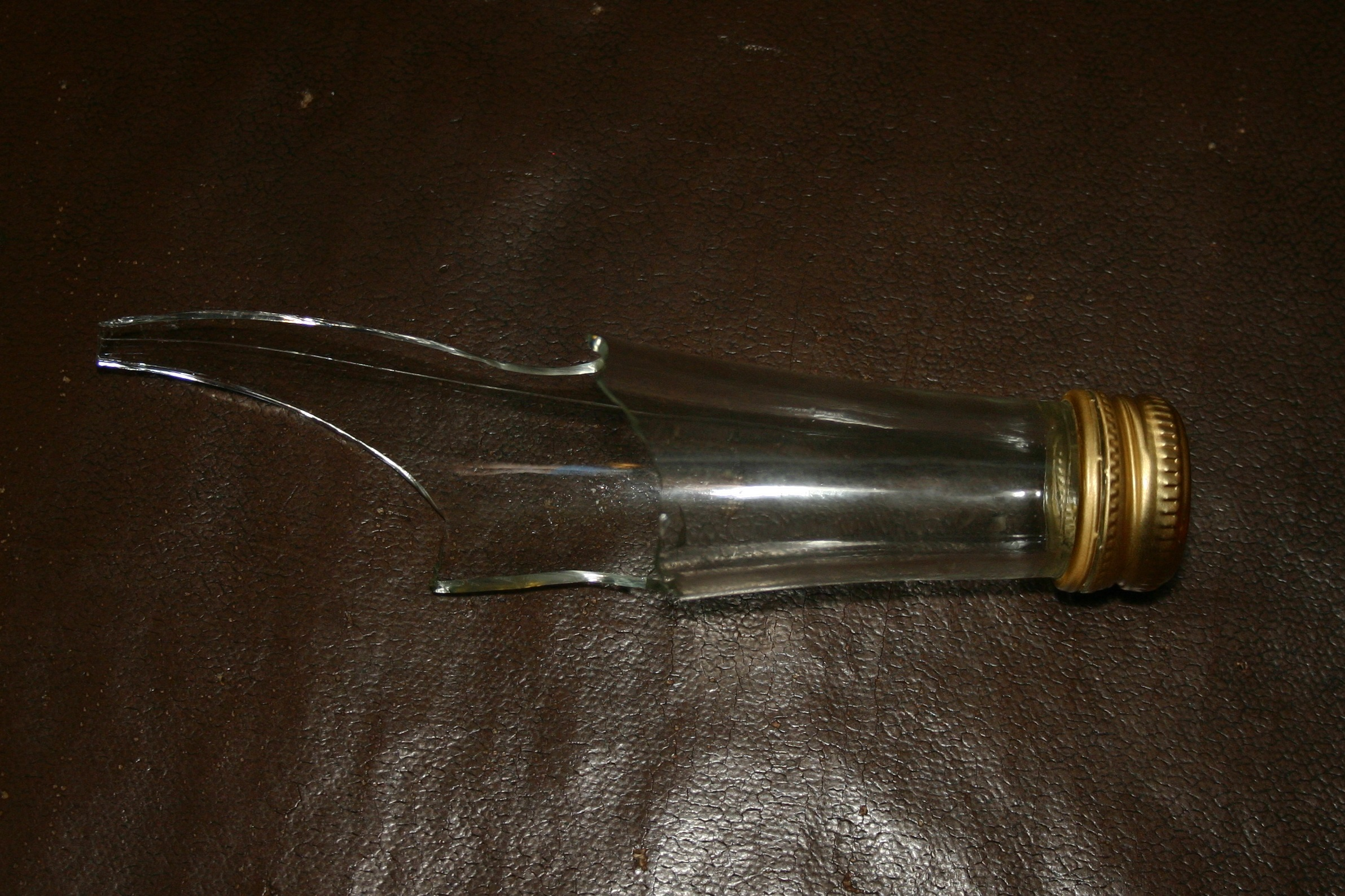
A broken bottle for glassing.

Glassing (or bottling in New Zealand) is a physical attack using a glass or bottle as a weapon. Glassings can occur at bars or pubs where alcohol is served and such items are readily available. The most common method of glassing involves the attacker smashing an intact glass vessel in the face of the victim, though it can also be smashed onto a surface, then gripped by the remaining base of the glass or neck of the bottle with the broken shards protruding outwards and used in a manner similar to a knife.

Common injuries resulting from glassings are heavy blood loss, permanent scarring, disfigurement and loss of sight through ocular injury. In the United Kingdom, there are over 5,000 injuries per year. Glassing is a relatively small portion of all alcohol-related violence, constituting 9% of injuries from alcohol-related violence in New South Wales, from 1999 to 2011, for instance.

A step to prevent glassing before it happens is to produce bottles utilizing plastic instead, which cannot shatter into jagged pieces, and has the advantage of being closed using a screw cap to retain a drink's carbonation. But in practice, the use of plastic is thought of as making an alcoholic drink look "downmarket", as many discount brands of liquor use plastic rather than glass and the liquor industry has not switched higher-end brands to plastic, and the latter is thought of as a higher-end container.

A filled plastic bottle can also be used as a blunt instrument which causes just as much danger and injury as a glassing. This was seen in a riotous incident which took place during a National Football League game in Cleveland, Ohio in 2001 where plastic beer bottles thrown by angry fans became blunt missiles, and which was known as the "Bottlegate" game. The incident effectively ended any further serious marketing of mass-market beer in plastic bottles.

Alcoholic drinks can be served in tempered glasses instead of traditional glassware, which results in a broken glass breaking into safer chunks unable to be weaponized, but is more costly to purchase for bars and pubs.

== Tempered glass as policy response ==
=== Australia ===
At least three states in Australia are addressing glassing incidents by introducing regulations for liquor-licensed venues:

- New South Wales introduced many restrictions in 2008, including the removal of glass after midnight for high-risk venues. This has resulted in a significant reduction in the number of glassings.
- In 2011, the government of Western Australia made recommendations to the state hospitality industry on the use of tempered glass in hotels in response to glassing violence. The state government and the Australian Hotels Association created a self-regulatory program on the rollout of tempered glass in pubs, with most hotels and bars expected to change over to tempered beer glasses in six to 12 months. Royal Perth Hospital's head of plastic surgery Mark Duncan-Smith described it as an important step in protecting the public.
- In Queensland, in response to continuing glassing incidents despite limited glass bans, state Liquor Licensing Minister Paul Lucas predicted in 2011 that almost all Queensland pubs and clubs would be (standard) glass-free in 10 years.

=== United Kingdom ===
In 2000, following a series of glassing attacks in Manchester, Greater Manchester Police and the Manchester Evening News launched a campaign Safe Glass Safe City promoting the use of toughened glass in pubs and clubs to prevent such attacks.
