= Henry P. Glass =

American architect and designer (1911–2003)

- Born: Heinrich Glass; September 24, 1911; Vienna, Austria
- Died: August 27, 2003 (aged 91); Northfield, Illinois, United States
- Occupations: designer, architect, author, inventor
- Spouse: Eleanore "Elly" Knopp Glass
- Children: 2
- Parent(s): Dr. Ernst Glass, Berta Zaitschek Glass

Henry P. Glass (September 24, 1911 – August 27, 2003) was an Austrian-born American designer, architect, author, and inventor.

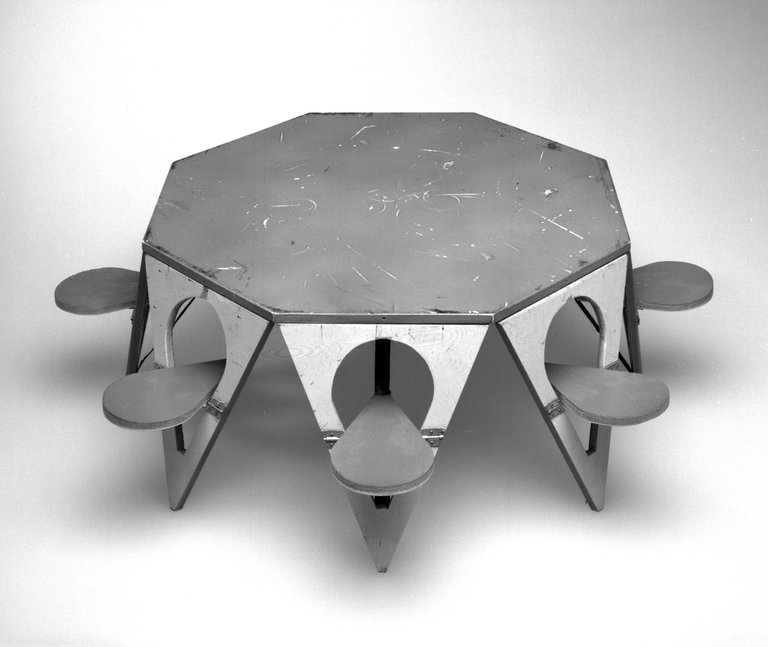
Folding Picnic Table Model, Designed 1961 Brooklyn Museum

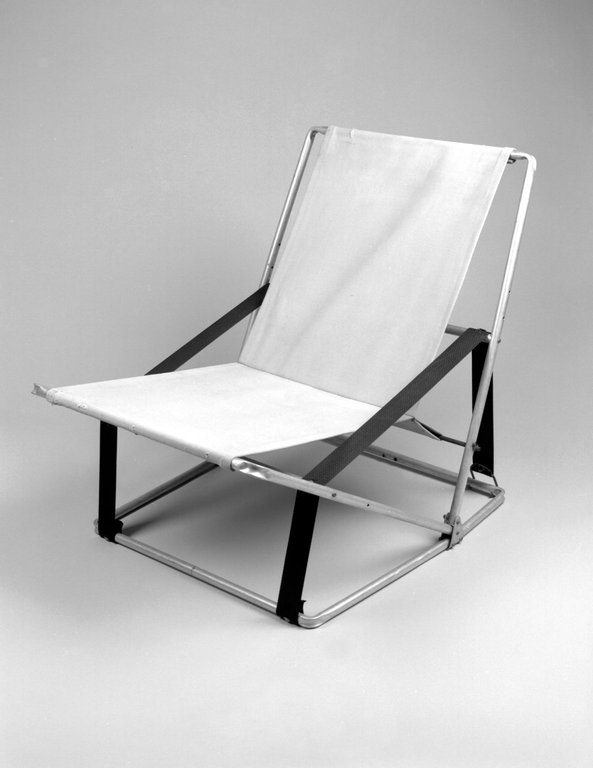
Folding Chair, Designed 1961 Brooklyn Museum

== Biography ==
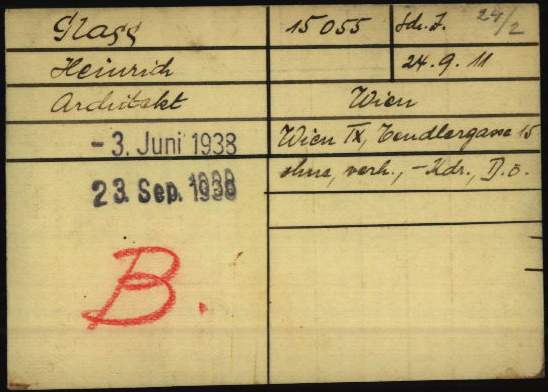
Registry card of Henry P. Glass as a prisoner at Dachau Nazi Concentration Camp

Born on 24 September 1911 in Vienna, Glass was trained as an architect at the Technical University of Vienna from 1929 to 1936. He married Eleanore Christine Knopp in March, 1937. Glass found early success designing interiors and furnishings for Vienna's bohemian elite until the Anschluss. He was denounced, sent to Dachau, then transferred to Buchenwald, where captors discovered his talents and forced him to design a cemetery for Nazi officers. He was finally released in 1939 through the intervention of his wife at the Gestapo in Berlin. Later during World War II, he assisted the US military by drawing a plan of the camp from memory.

He immigrated to New York City in 1939, worked for Russel Wright and for Gilbert Rohde on the Anthracite Pavilion at the 1939 World's Fair. Glass moved to Chicago in 1942, where he worked as a designer of office furniture for the war effort and studied under László Moholy-Nagy and György Kepes at the IIT Institute of Design. He soon established a career as a furniture and product designer, and opened his own design firm, Henry P. Glass Associates at the Furniture Mart in 1946. A William J. Brenner sofa designed by Glass was used on the living room set of the I Love Lucy show during the 1952–53 season.

Henry was a great admirer of R. Buckminster Fuller and he made a deposit on Fuller's Dymaxion House, a prefabricated structure that could be assembled at any site. When none but two prototypes of this house were built, Henry decided to become the architect of his own passive solar home which was one of the first of its kind in America. The Henry P. Glass House was built in 1948 and it still stands on its original site in Northfield, Illinois.

In addition to running his own industrial design business, Glass convinced the School of the Art Institute of Chicago to create an industrial design department in 1946 where he served as a professor for more than twenty years.

The Henry P. Glass collection in the Ryerson & Burnham Library Archives contains the original manuscript for Glass's book Design and the Consumer, his teaching lecture notes, product advertisements, brochures, and photographs. Several of his pieces are on permanent display in the American Art Collection at the Art Institute of Chicago. His drawings and furniture scale models are much in demand by collectors.

Glass was awarded 52 US patents, of which 29 are referenced online. He was a Fellow of the Industrial Designers Society of America and received numerous other awards.

He died on August 27, 2003, at the age of 91.

== Concepts, buildings and designs ==
Concepts: Efficiency in materials use, minimize waste in manufacturing, reduce environmental impact. Optimize shipping, portability & storage of furnishings by use of folding and collapsing design elements. This earned him the name "Folding Glass" in the industrial design community.

Major design projects:

- Kling Studios (1946) Chicago, Illinois
- Flamboyant Hotel, Virgin Islands

Architectural Work:

- Warehouse Conversion to Apartment House (1934–37) Vienna, Austria
- Henry P. Glass House (1948) Northfield, Illinois
- Alcoa Forecast Accordium Camp Trailer (1964) for Aluminum Corporation of America
- Ski Chalet (1965) Northern Michigan
- Prefab High Rise (1968) for Mobile Homes Manufacturing Association

The Henry P. Glass House (1948) is arguably the first passive solar house in America and has been continuously occupied for over 60 years. Previous passive solar houses were either experimental or did not possess all the essential features of a solar home. In the Chicago area, George Fred Keck had included some of these passive solar design features (roof overhang, N-S ventilation, masonry floor) in the Spence House in 1941. Innovative new designs incorporating passive solar elements were built by Frank Lloyd Wright, F.W. Hutchinson and others but they lacked one or more features incorporated in Henry's design. It is important to differentiate these passive solar designs from the Active Design work carried on at M.I.T. which required fans or pumps to transfer the heat from the collectors to storage areas.

Passive solar features of the Henry P. Glass House include:

- South facing structure maximizes heat from winter sun
- Large glass solar collection windows on south side
- Thermopane glass used in windows reduces heat loss
- Blinds over thermopane windows further reduce nighttime heat loss in winter
- Angled roof provides maximum sunlight in winter
- North-South cross ventilation in summer
- Roof overhang shades interior of house in summer
- Deciduous trees on south side provide shade in summer, allow light through in winter
- Berm on south side blocks winter wind
- Small windows on north side reduce heat loss in winter
- Concrete slab floor acts as a heatsink to absorb thermal energy in day, release at night
- Black finish on concrete floor improves thermal transfer

His industrial designs include:

- Inflatable Chairs (1941)
- Hairpin Leg Furniture (1942)
- Saran Weave Folding Lawn Recliner (1953)
- Swingline Children's Furniture (1954)
- Kenmar/Glass Omega Lounger (1957)
- Cylindra Furniture (1966) concept developed in 1942
- Cricket Chair (1978)

== Works ==
- Glass, Henry. Design and the Consumer. Chicago: unpublished manuscript.
- Glass, Henry (1994). The Shape of Manmade Things. Chicago: Privately published.

- Seven Qualifications of Good Design Applied to Man-made Objects:

- Function
- Aesthetics
- Matter
- Process
- Ecology
- Economy
- Originality

== Bibliography ==
- Gorman, Carma R. "Henry P. Glass and World War II," Design Issues 22, no. 4 (Autumn 2006): 4–26
- Head, Jeffrey. "How Things Work: The Inventions of Henry P. Glass." Modernism Magazine Spring (2004), pp. 80–86

== Former students ==
- Charles "Chuck" Harrison
