= Slick =

Slick may refer to:

== People ==
- Slick (wrestling) (born 1957), American former professional wrestling manager
- Slick (nickname)
- Slick (surname)

== Arts, entertainment and media ==
=== Fictional characters ===
- Slick (comics), two different characters in the Marvel Universe
- Slick, the final boss in the video game River City Ransom
- Slick, one of the main characters in the webcomic Sinfest
- Slick, a character in the television series Oddbods
- Sam Slick, a character created by Thomas Chandler Haliburton, a Canadian judge and author
- Soapy Slick, saloon operator and profiteer in the Scrooge McDuck comic series
- Tom Slick, the title character of the TV series Tom Slick

=== Other arts, entertainment and media ===
- Slick (album), a 1977 album by Eddie Kendricks
- Slick (magazine format), an upmarket format for magazines indicating they were printed on high quality paper
- "Slick", the second episode of the TV series Birds of Prey
- "Slick", a song by Joe Satriani from The Electric Joe Satriani: An Anthology

== Transportation ==
- Bell UH-1 Iroquois, a military helicopter nicknamed Slick
- Slick Airways, an American charter and scheduled freight airline
- Slick tire, used in motor racing

== Other uses ==
- Slick, Oklahoma, a US town
- Slick (tool), a large woodworking chisel
- Slick (hiding place), used by militant Zionist groups in Mandatory Palestine to hide weapons
- Ocean slick, meandering lines of smooth water on the ocean surface, caused by a variety of mechanisms
- KCNT2 (symbol SLICK), a human gene

== See also ==
- SLIC (disambiguation)
- Slick chick (disambiguation)
- Slick Willie (disambiguation)
- Slik (disambiguation)
