= Leilot =

Wordless novel composed of linocut prints on the Holocaust

Leilot – Through the Night
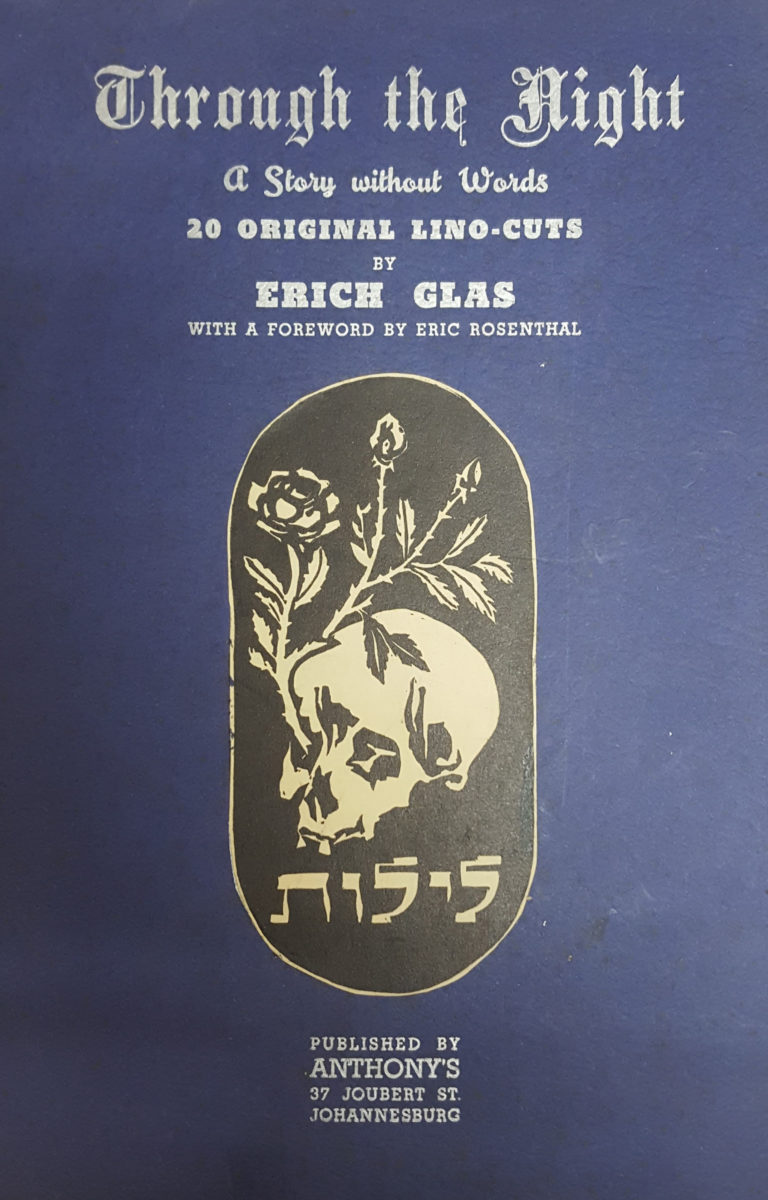
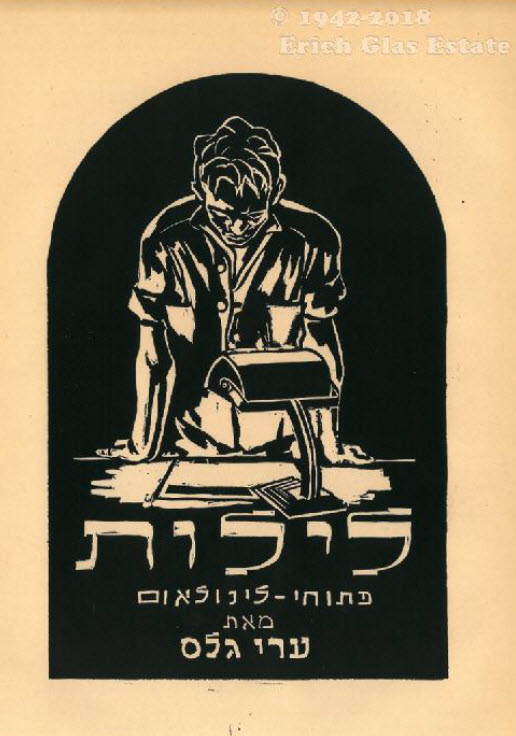
- Through the Night (1943) Leilot (1945)
- Artist: Erich Glas
- Year: 1943 (English); 1945 (Hebrew)
- Medium: Linocut prints
- Movement: German Expressionism
- Dimensions: 33 cm × 23.5 cm (13 in × 9.3 in)

Leilot (Hebrew: לילות, lit. 'Nights') is a wordless novel by Erich Glas, a German-born Israeli artist. Made up of black-and-white linocut prints, it depicts scenes related to the persecution of Jews during World War II. This work is considered one of the earliest Holocaust-related graphic art representations produced outside Europe during the war.

The original artwork was first published in English in 1943 under the title Through the Night: A Story without Words, with 20 prints. A revised Hebrew edition was published in 1945 with 28 prints.

== Background ==
Erich Glas was a World War I veteran. Leilot is closely tied to Glas's personal and artistic development. Researchers argue that his artwork was influenced by his experiences on the front line and reports of the 1938 Kristallnacht pogrom, in which Karl Adler, the father of his wife Shoshana (Susi) was murdered..

After the Nazis came to power in Germany, he moved to Mandatory Palestine in 1934 and settled in Kibbutz Yagur.

Leilot was created in 1942, when news of the persecution and mass murder of Jews in Nazi-occupied Europe reached the Yishuv through indirect and incomplete reports.

Later reports link the origin of the work to an episode in the winter of 1942, when Glas was taken to the infirmary of Kibbutz Yagur with a high fever. It is said that during this period he experienced vivid hallucinatory visions of persecution, violence, and destruction, which he began to sketch despite his illness.

Once recovered, Glas converted these sketches into a series of linocuts. The story starts with a self-referential image of the artist being confronted by a personification of Death, who forces him to observe and record the scenes of violence taking place in Europe. The images shift from scenes of persecution and expulsion to imprisonment, forced labor and mass execution.

While Glas had no direct experience of the Holocaust, scholars have cited it as an early attempt to depict these events from a distance, driven by emotional proximity, not experience.

== Publication history ==
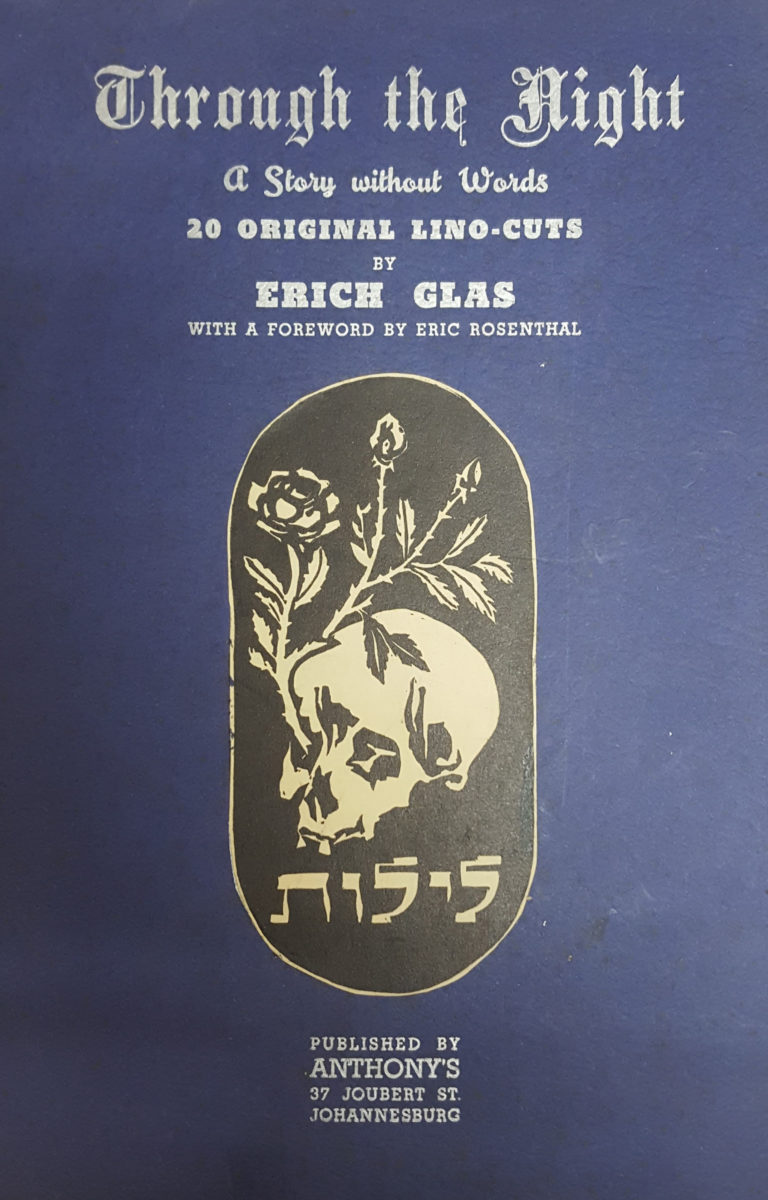
English edition, 1943

=== 1943 English edition (South Africa) ===
After completing the initial series, Glas presented the work to members of Kibbutz Yagur, where he was living. Contemporary accounts suggest that the work provoked strong reactions, but he encountered difficulty securing publication in Mandatory Palestine.

The work was first published in 1943 in Johannesburg as Through the Night: a Story without Words, by Anthony’s. This edition included a foreword by historian Eric Rosenthal, and comprised 20 linocuts.

The edition is described as a limited print run of 200 copies, and information about the physical format and circulation is available in auction and catalog records.

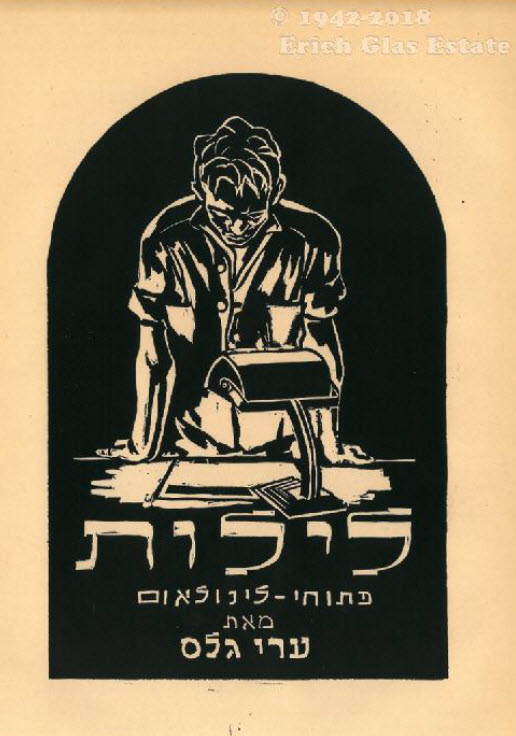
Hebrew edition, 1945

=== 1945 Hebrew edition (Mandatory Palestine) ===
HaKibbutz HaMeuchad published the first version of the work in Hebrew as Leilot in 1945. This expanded edition included 28 linocuts and was with a foreword by the literary critic Dov Sadan.

The visual sequence was lengthened, and the story shifted from a single night to a more general allegory about the Holocaust.

=== Modern reception ===
In the 21st century, Leilot has had continued scholarly and curatorial attention as an early Holocaust-era visual narrative created outside Europe. This work is treated in a 2018 essay by Scott Ponemone that looks at the work's history and the circumstances around its creation.

The series is further included in Graphic Witness: Five Wordless Graphic Novels (2021), which places Glas in the context of twentieth-century artists in wordless narrative printmaking.

A French-language edition, Dans la nuit, was also published, in 2022, showing the relevance of Glas to modern publishing and academia.

Original copies of Leilot have been noted in private collections and auctions, where they are recognized as rare wartime print portfolio examples.

== Themes and interpretation ==
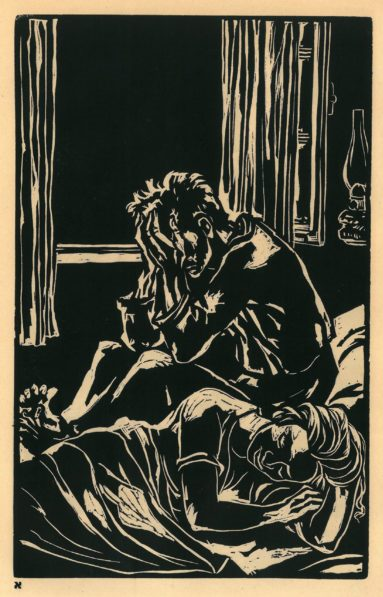
Leilot (1945) – The awakening

Leilot has been associated with German Expressionism due to its black-and-white contrast, simplified compositions, and emotionally intense visual style, and has been described as a sequential graphic narrative without textual captions.

The series has been interpreted as engaging with recurring themes of persecution, forced displacement, imprisonment, and mass violence during World War II. It also includes self-referential elements, including repeated depictions of the artist figure, which have been read as linking the act of representation to the historical events depicted.

Rachel E. Perry situates Leilot within her study of graphic albums produced by Jewish artists in Mandatory Palestine during World War II. She argues that such works reflect emotional and artistic responses to early knowledge of the Holocaust and use printmaking as a medium for expressing collective trauma and historical change.

Within this framework, Perry characterizes Leilot as an example of tele-pathos, in which traumatic events are represented through emotionally charged imagery despite physical distance from the events. She reads the work as a story within a story, in which the artist's experience of witnessing and recording destruction is embedded within the broader narrative structure.

In an analysis of visual representations of death, Olivier de Schrynmakers discusses artistic traditions in which death is personified or structurally embedded within visual narratives, where it may function as an organizing principle in narrative development.

In Leilot, the figure of Death has been interpreted as an active presence that interacts with the artist across multiple panels, including scenes in which it influences or directs the act of representation.

Scholars more broadly describe Leilot as a self-reflective narrative in which the artist appears within the visual sequence, linking representation itself to historical events. The work has also been discussed in relation to the material qualities of linocut printmaking, particularly its use of contrast and incision to convey emotional intensity.

== Collections ==
Works from Leilot are part of collections at places like the Israel Museum and are listed by the National Library of Israel.

== Gallery ==
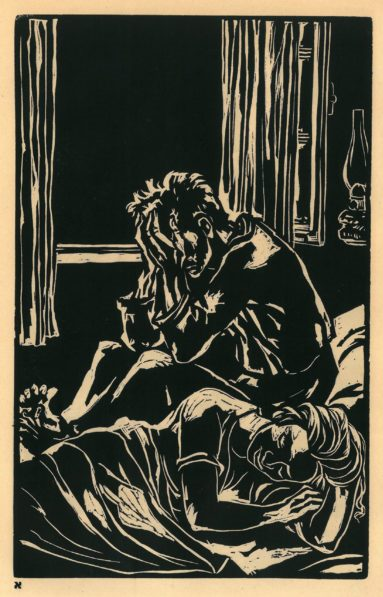
1. The Awakening

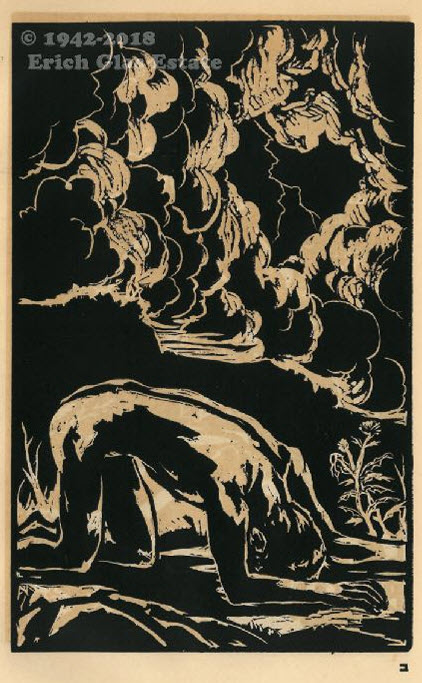
2. The Storm

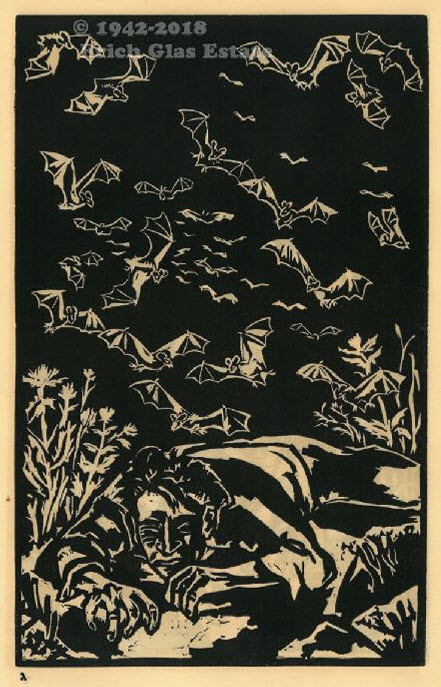
3. Contemplation

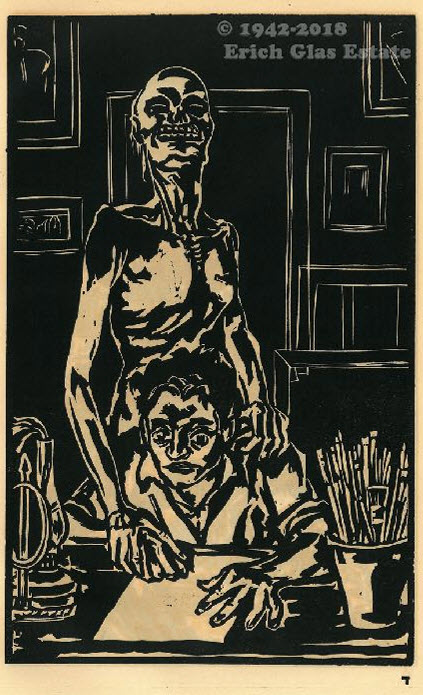
4. Death Speaks

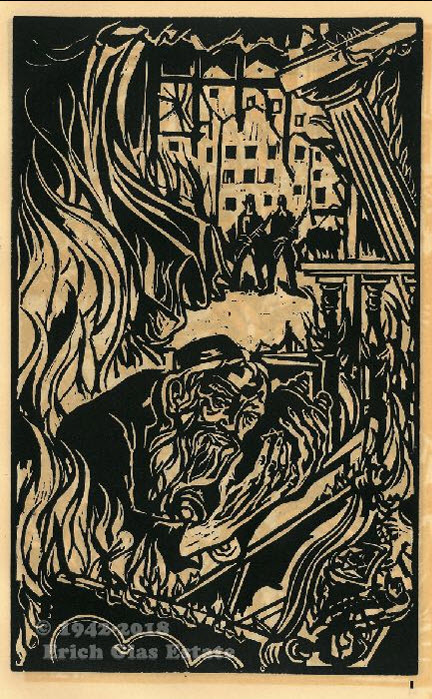
6. In the Flames

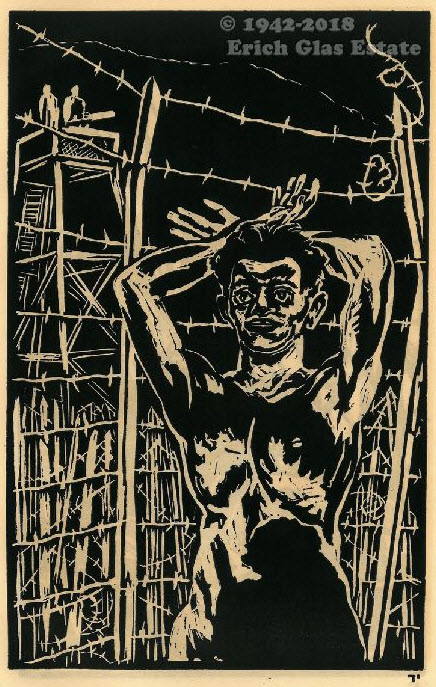
14. Concentration Camp

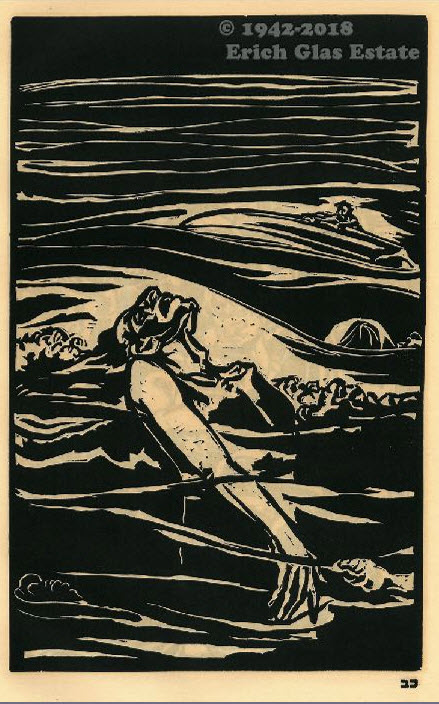
22. The End

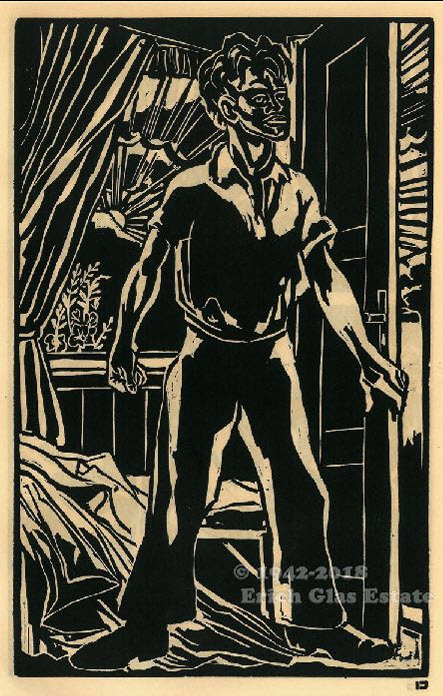
26. Arise!

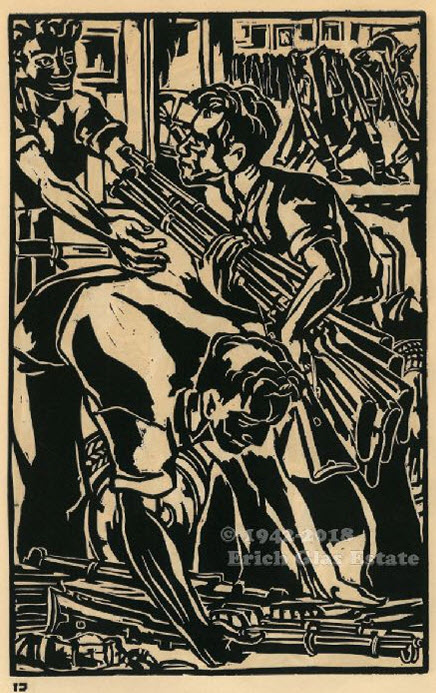
27. To Arms!

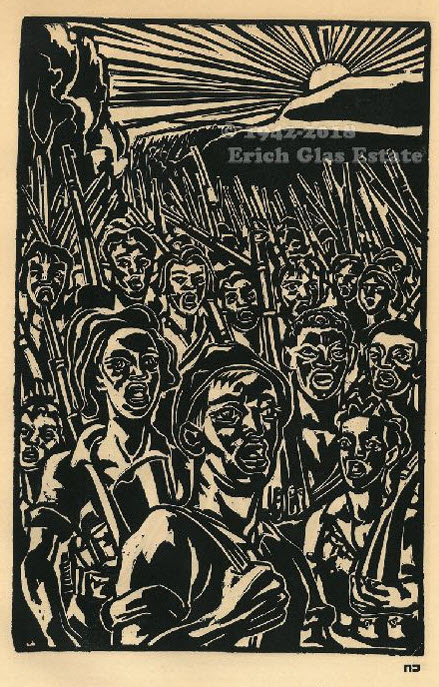
28. Fight for Freedom!
