= Slik (disambiguation) =

Slik was a 1970s Scottish pop group.

Slik may also refer to:

- Slik (album), by the Scottish pop group
- Ivar Slik, racing cyclist
- Rozanne Slik, racing cyclist
- SLIK Corporation, a manufacturer of photographic tripods
- Slick (hiding place) for weapons used by the Jewish armed forces in Mandatory Palestine

== See also ==
- Slick (disambiguation)
- Silk (disambiguation)
