= Ruger MP9 =

American submachine gun/machine pistol

- Type: Submachine gun
- Place of origin: United States

Production history
- Designer: Uziel Gal, Itzaak Yaakov, and Bill Ruger
- Designed: 1980s
- Manufacturer: Sturm, Ruger & Co.
- Produced: 1995–1996
- No. built: 1500

Specifications
- Mass: 5.94 pounds (2.69 kg) (unloaded)
- Length: 14.8 inches (380 mm) (stock folded); 22 inches (560 mm) (stock folded)
- Barrel length: 6.8 inches (170 mm)
- Cartridge: 9×19mm Parabellum
- Action: Blowback
- Rate of fire: 600 rounds/min cyclic rate
- Effective firing range: Rear sight adjustable for 50 or 150 meters
- Feed system: 32-round box magazine
- Sights: Iron sights (peep rear sight and post front sight)

The Ruger MP9 is a 9×19mm submachine gun/machine pistol introduced by Sturm, Ruger & Co. in 1995. The MP9 was designed by Uziel Gal, designer of the Uzi.

== History ==
In the late 1980s, Gal, designer of the Uzi, improved his design. During this time, American gun manufacturer Sturm, Ruger & Co., bought the rights to the Uzi. The MP9 entered Ruger's catalogs in 1995.

However, despite recognition as the "improved Uzi" by its creator, the MP9 was not successful. The weapon was intended for American government agents for use in close quarters defense, but was not adopted.

The MP9 saw use during the Burundian Civil War.

== Design ==
The MP9 was designed by Gal as an attempt to improve upon the Uzi. The MP9 uses a hammer-fired closed-bolt design. Foundational elements, such as the blowback operating action, are similar with minor improvements for efficiency. Similar to the Uzi, the MP9 was designed around simplicity, with these combination of factors leading the MP9 to be named the "improved Uzi".

Other changes Ruger and Gal designed included a change of materials. Development of polymers during the 1980s inspired the designers to adopt those materials: the lower receiver and pistol grip of the MP9 are manufactured from Zytel, a polymer designed during the 1980s. The polymer butt-stock connects to the frame via a polymer hinge.

The MP9 has a three-position switch co-mingling the 'safety' and 'fire' selector: the upper position of the lever indicates the MP9 is "safe" (aka non-firing), the mid-position causes the MP9 to operate in semi-automatic mode, the bottom position switches the MP9 to automatic mode so the 32-round magazine can be emptied in three seconds.

The MP9 has a firing-pin block to prevent an impact-related negligent discharge if it is dropped.

The MP9 has a detachable barrel cushioned by a spring while the bolt was closed to reduce the effects of recoil.

The MP9 cocking-handle is on top of the stainless-steel receiver.

== See also ==
- BXP
- MPA submachine gun
- Patria submachine gun
