= Slick (surname) =

Slick is the surname of:

- China Kantner (aka China Slick Kantner; born 1971), American actor and VJ; daughter of Grace Slick
- Darby Slick (born 1944), American guitarist and songwriter; brother-in-law to Grace Slick
- Duane Slick (born 1961) American Meskwaki artist and educator
- Earl Slick (born 1952), American guitarist and songwriter
- Eric Slick (born 1987), American singer, songwriter, and drummer
- Grace Slick (born 1939), American singer and songwriter; sister-in-law to Darby Slick
- Jonathan Slick (pseudonym of Ann S. Stephens; 1810–1886), American novelist and editor
- Matt Slick (born ?), American Christian apologist, anti-cultist, and website founder [see: Christian Apologetics and Research Ministry]
- Mitchy Slick (born 1973), American rapper and music executive
- Stephen Slick (born ?), American government official and clinical professor
- Thomas Baker Slick Sr. (1883–1930), American oil prospector
- Thomas Whitten Slick (1869–1959), American lawyer and judge
- Tom Slick (1916–1962), American inventor, businessman, adventurer; son of Thomas Baker Slick Sr.

== See also ==
- Slick (nickname)
