= Erich Glas =

German painter

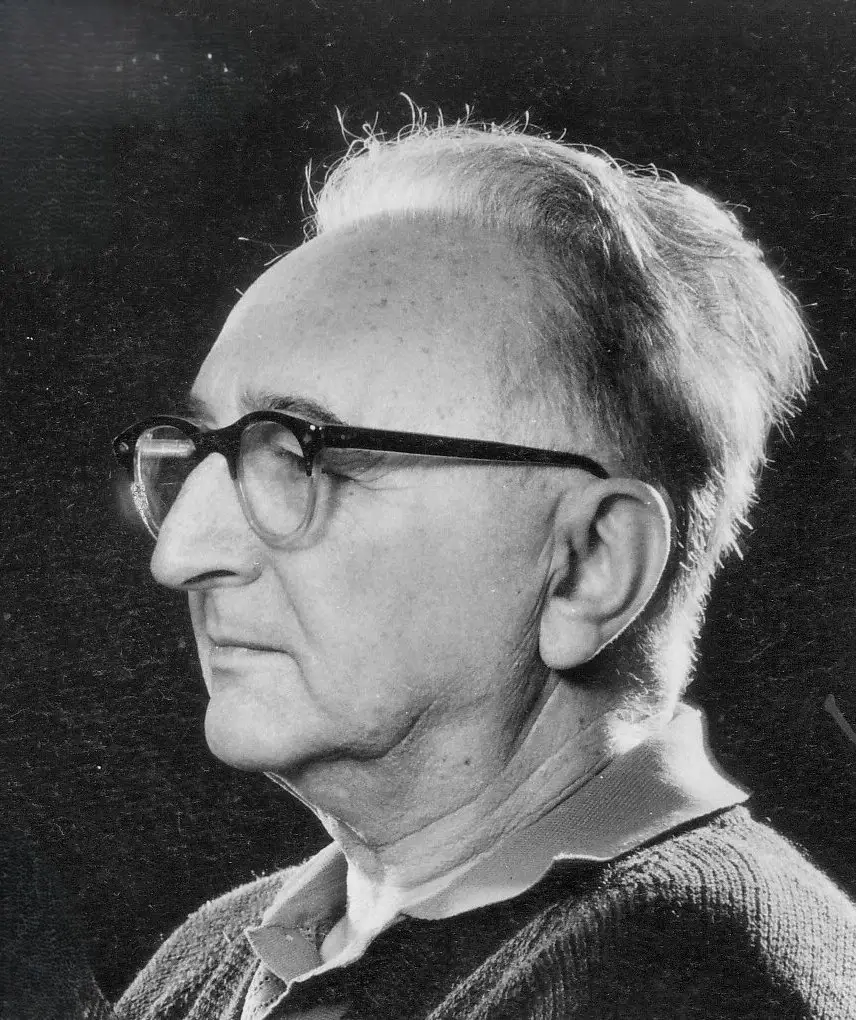
- Born: Erich Glas; 29 June 1897; Berlin, Germany
- Died: 23 January 1973 (aged 75); Haifa, Israel
- Education: Academy of Fine Arts, Munich
- Known for: Painting, Graphic Design, Illustration and Photography
- Children: 4 | Uziel Gal, Michael Gal, Yoram Gal, Reuven Gal
- Website: https://erichglas.com/

Erich Glas (Hebrew: עֵרִי גְּלַס; 29 June 1897 – 23 January 1973) was a German-born Israeli painter, graphic designer, illustrator, and photographer. He contributed to early modernist graphic art in Germany and later appeared as an important figure in the artistic life of the Kibbutz Movement in Mandatory Palestine and Israel. Glas is especially recognized for his wordless linocut book Leilot (1945), which depicts the persecution of Jews during the Holocaust.

== Early Life and Family ==
Erich Glas, the only son of an actress and souffleuse (prompter), was born in Berlin. In 1903, when he was six years old, his mother’s career ended following a severe stage accident. Raised without his father, Glas was cared for by his aunt and uncle, the prominent German theatre figures Louise Dumont and Gustav Lindemann. He attended a boarding school in Düsseldorf, where he exhibited aptitude in engineering and technical drafting.

== Participation in the First World War ==
Glas’s aspirations were interrupted by the outbreak of World War I. In 1914, at age 17, he enlisted in the Imperial German Army. During the war, he served as a commando soldier and subsequently as an officer on the Western Front. He was wounded in battle and received the Iron Cross, First Class, the highest military decoration. After his recuperation, he served as aerial flight observer and aerial photographer in the Imperial German Army. His experiences on the front lines, including combat and the loss of fellow soldiers, significantly shaped the thematic focus of his art, particularly in works that address war and death.

== Artistic Education ==
During the war, he met an army officer, Karl Adler, and his wife, Emilie, who became lifelong friends and an important patron of Glas's early artistic career.

After the war, Glas studied at the Akademie der Bildenden Künste in Munich and befriended Max Liebermann and Alfred Kubin. In 1919, he enrolled at the Bauhaus school in Weimar, studying under Lyonel Feininger and Johannes Itten. In 1920, he joined the Das Junge Rheinland artist association. He later studied at the Staatliche Kunstschule in Berlin under Philipp Franck, eventually taught there, and worked as a press photographer.

While Glas experimented with various artistic forms during his studies, he initially concentrated on printmaking, particularly etching and lithography. In contrast to contemporaries who adopted Surrealism, Glas preferred New Objectivity (Neue Sachlichkeit), maintaining that art should reflect observed reality. To accurately depict his subjects, Glas resided in an asylum for two weeks to create a series of portraits of individuals with mental illness.

== Early Creation ==
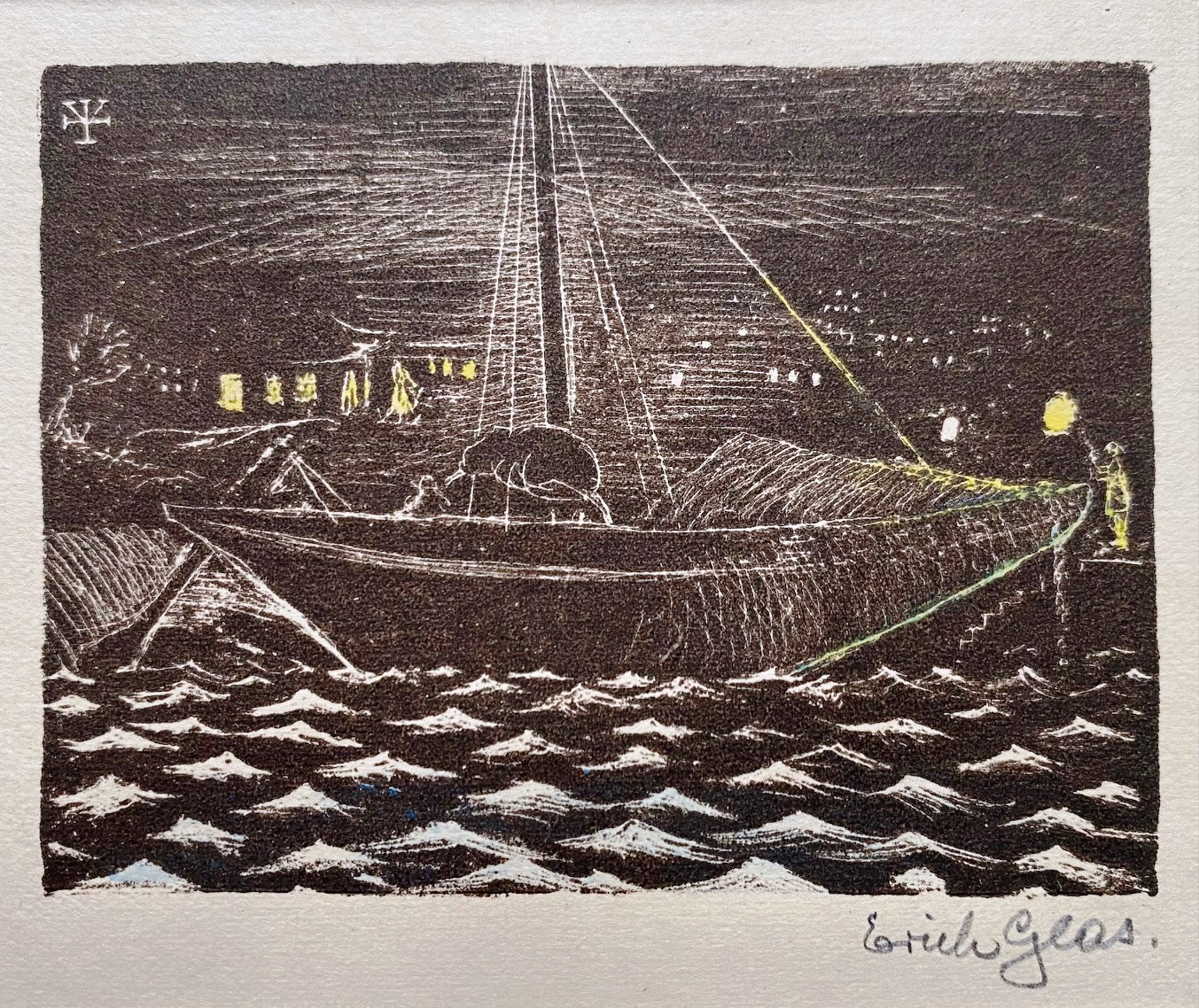
Tosa Nikki - Im Murvofel (1922)

During his time in Weimar, Glas created detailed illustrations for bibliophile editions of works such as poems by Li Bai, Das Tosa Nikki by Ki no Tsurayuki, and Die Nachtigall by Hans Christian Andersen. He also produced notable woodcuts, such as those for Phaedrus’s Aesopian Fables, which are based on ancient moral themes. Between 1920 and 1921, Glas completed eight wood engravings, each with a limited circulation of 50 copies.

During this period, Glas also produced the woodcut series In Flanders Reit’t der Tod (The devil rides in Flanders), likely inspired by the song of the same name. Glas’s series depicts marauding Landsknechts and draws parallels with atrocities perpetrated by German soldiers against the Belgian civilian population at the onset of the war. The figure of Death alludes to the apocalyptic horsemen described in the Revelation of John. This personification of Death appears throughout Glas’s oeuvre and is particularly evident in later works such as Leilot.

== Emigration to Mandatory Palestine ==
After the Nazi rise to power in 1933, Glas was dismissed from his teaching position because of his Jewish identity. He subsequently worked in stage design, photography, illustration, and cartooning. The satirical nature of his work likely increased his risk of arrest by the regime, prompting his emigration with his family to Palestine in 1934. The family settled at Kibbutz Yagur.

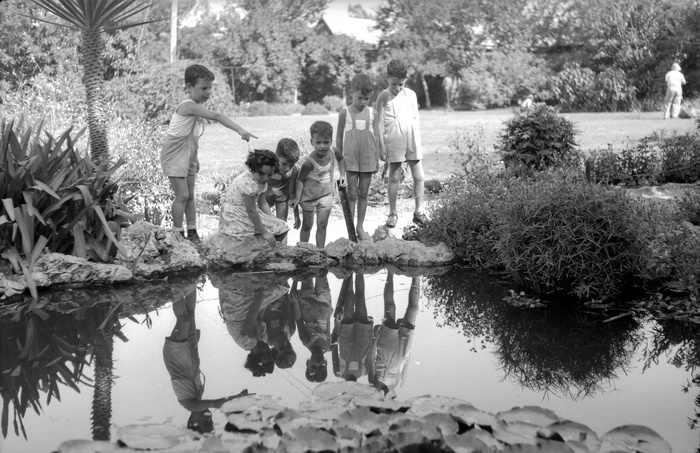
Children by the ornamental pond in front of the dining hall, Kibbutz Yagur.

Life in the Kibbutz was a huge change for Glas and his family. They were used to an urban lifestyle and have so far been active in the artistic circles of Berlin, Munich, and Weimar. Now they had to adapt to the communal agricultural life, which consisted largely of tents, learn Hebrew, and get used to a different mentality. To continue working as an artist, Glas had to reconcile his work with the kibbutz's needs. He was also able to contribute his experience from a wide variety of professions: he worked as a carpenter, taught at the local school, designed stage sets for performances and festivities, and decorated calendars & pamphlets. He even regularly participated in the nightly security patrols. In fact, he also assisted the Zionist underground organization Haganah in obtaining information through aerial photographs, drawing on his military training and his skills as a photographer. In time, Glas continued his artistic work on the Kibbutz and also passed on his skills by returning to work as an art teacher.

He became the Kibbutz's photographer and began documenting life there. The pictures show the development of the Kibbutz, fieldwork, celebrations, and the surrounding landscape of the Mount Carmel procession. He also visited other Kibbutzim and accompanied them with the camera from the start. In the archives of Kibbutz Yagur today, there are more than 800 black-and-white photographs of Glas, created over a period of more than 20 years. A contrast to the photographs was his colored cartoons, which were exhibited weekly in the Kibbutz dining room. Satirically, he raised the critical aspects of everyday life and life under British colonial rule.

== Leilot and later work ==
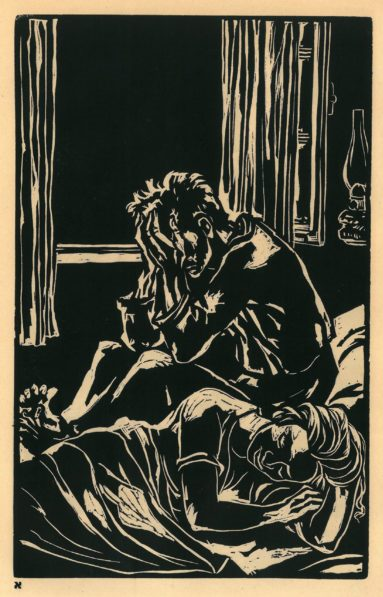
Leilot (1945) 1. The awakening

Leilot – Hebrew for “nights” – is one of the most important works of Glas. This is a wordless novel told in 20 black-and-white lithographs in the original 1943 English edition, later expanded to 28 in a Hebrew edition. In it, an artist is haunted by death, and it shows him visions of the persecution of the Jews in all their dimensions by the National Socialists. In addition to the artistic quality of the illustrations, the story behind it is also remarkable; in 1942, one evening, Glas was brought to the Kibbutz infirmary with severe fever. While fighting the disease for nights, he hallucinated about the Holocaust. After his recovery, he immediately got to work; the illustrations tell of pogroms, humiliations, prison camps, executions, and murder, but also of the hope of resistance. In fact, Glas, who was already confronted with corpses and mass extinctions in his time as a soldier, created an extremely precise picture of the atrocities in Europe, which at the time came to Palestine only as rumors. Thus, “Leilot” represents one of the earliest artistic representations of the Holocaust.

Unusually, in 1943, the work appeared in an English-language edition of 200 (title “Through the Night”) in distant South Africa. Contact with the publishing house New Era Press was made by his mother-in-law's sister, who emigrated there. It is unclear how Glas managed to produce the woodcuts and send them to South Africa during the war years. On the other hand, it is proven that Glas had difficulty finding a publisher in Israel (then still referred to as “Palestine”) because the content was too controversial. Later in 1945, Leilot appeared in a Hebrew version published by Hakibbutz Hameuchad, with 8 additional printings and a foreword by the literary critic, newspaper editor, and later Israeli politician Dov Sadan. Recently, Leilot has once again drawn attention. Art blogger Scott Ponemone wrote an article on Leilot. Furthermore, Leilot was part of the graphic collection “Graphic Witness: Five Wordless Graphic Novels” by George Walker. In 2022, Leilot was re-released in France under the title Dans La Nuit.

In the following decades, Glas continued to create paintings, prints, and photographs. His works were exhibited in Kibbutz galleries and Israeli cultural institutions, and are represented in museum and archival collections throughout Israel.

== Later life ==
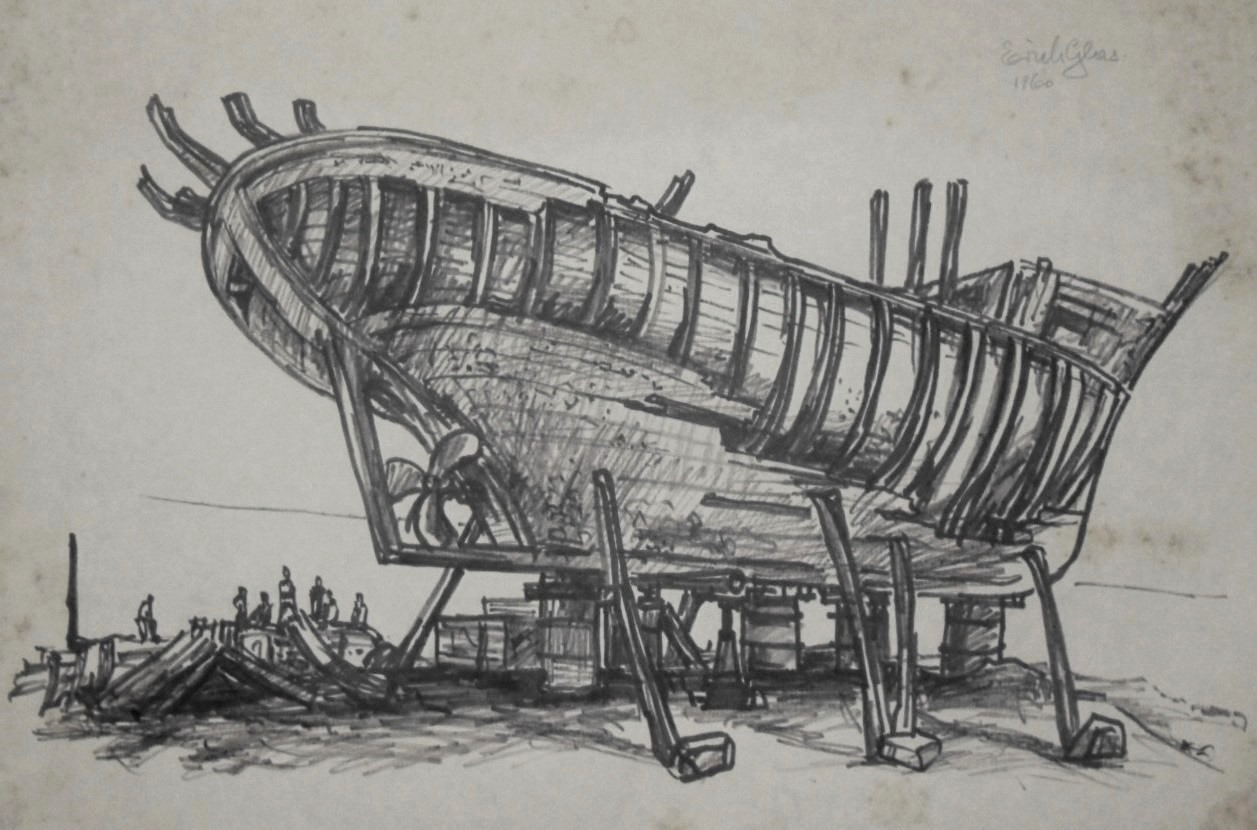
Boat (1960)

After the death of his wife, Shoshana Adler, who passed away following a prolonged illness in 1957, Glas entered a new phase of life by leaving the Kibbutz and relocating to Acre (Akko), a historic port city north of Haifa. There, he married Ziva Dioshka, a Hungarian immigrant, and settled with her in the old town. His artistic work during this period reflected the vibrant life of the port city, depicting its architecture, Mediterranean landscapes, and the coexistence of Jewish and Arab communities. After the 1967 Six-Day War, the couple moved to Haifa, where Glas continued painting until his death in 1973 at age 75.

== Personal life ==
Glas was married three times and had four children. While living in Weimar, he married Maria Langhans-Zacharias. Their son Gotthard was born in 1923, but the marriage was short-lived. Later, he married the daughter of Karl and Emilie Adler, Susanne (Susi)/Shoshana, and they had three sons.

Gotthard Glas, son from his first marriage, known by his Hebrew name Uziel (Uzi) Gal, invented the Israeli submachine gun, Uzi. The three sons from his second marriage to Susi Adler: Michael Gal, a former Director General of the Municipality of Jerusalem, he is remembered for his education reforms in Israel. Their second son, Yoram Gal, led a team that received the Rothschild Prize in 1984. The youngest son, Reuven Gal, was killed in the Yom Kippur War at the age of 29.

== Wordless Novels ==
- Through the Night; A Story without Words. Glas, Erich (artist); Rosenthal, Eric (foreword). Anthony's, Johannesburg, South Africa (Publisher) 1943
- Leilot (לילות in Hebrew). Glas, Erich (artist); Shtok-Sadan, Dov (foreword). Tel Aviv, HaKibbutz HaMeuchad (Publisher) 1945
- Glas, Erich; Lev, Hagar; Gal, Iddo (2022). Dans la nuit (in French). Toulouse. ISBN 979-10-90507-42-5. OCLC 1352451290.

== Gallery ==
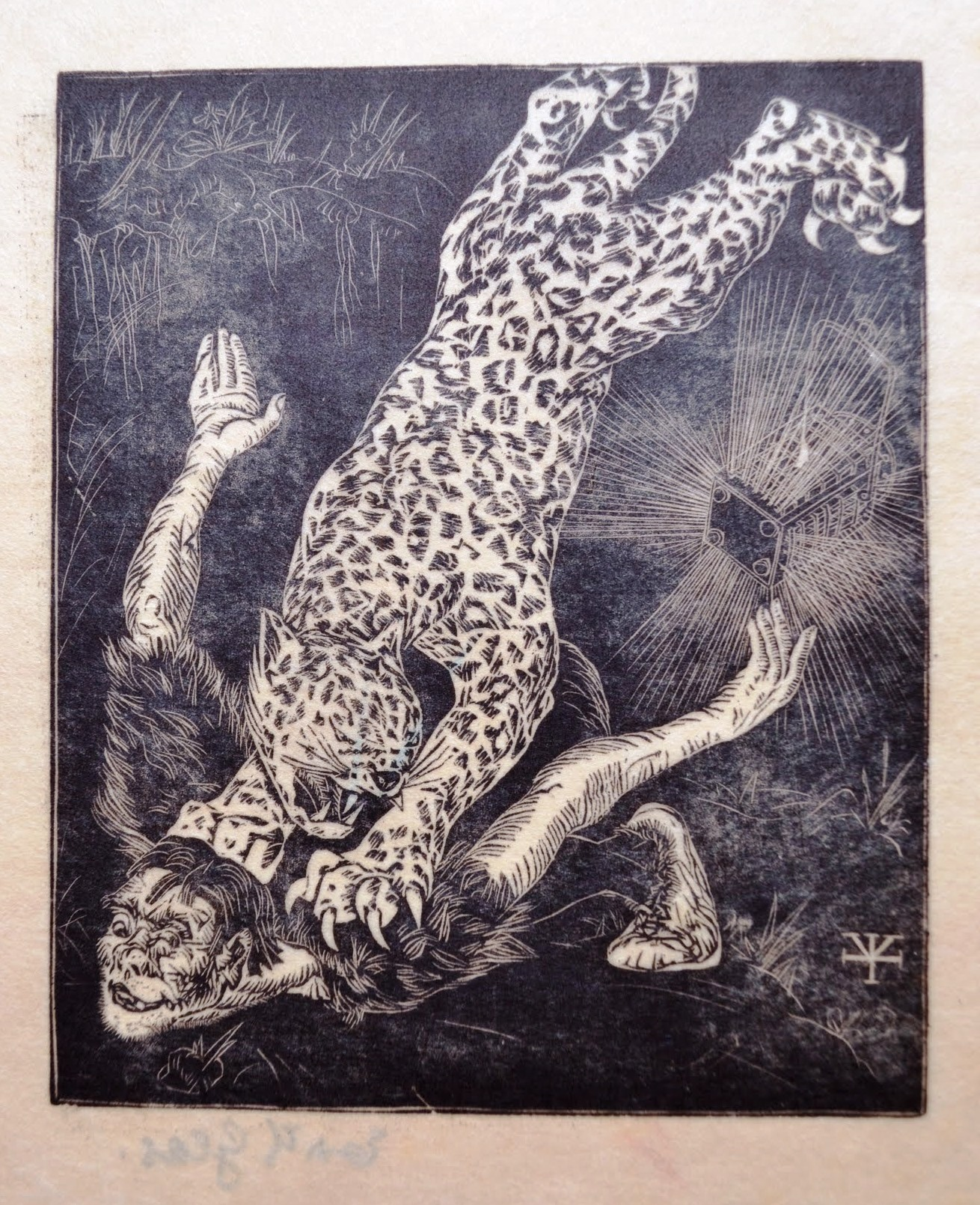
The panther and the shepherd (1921), Etching

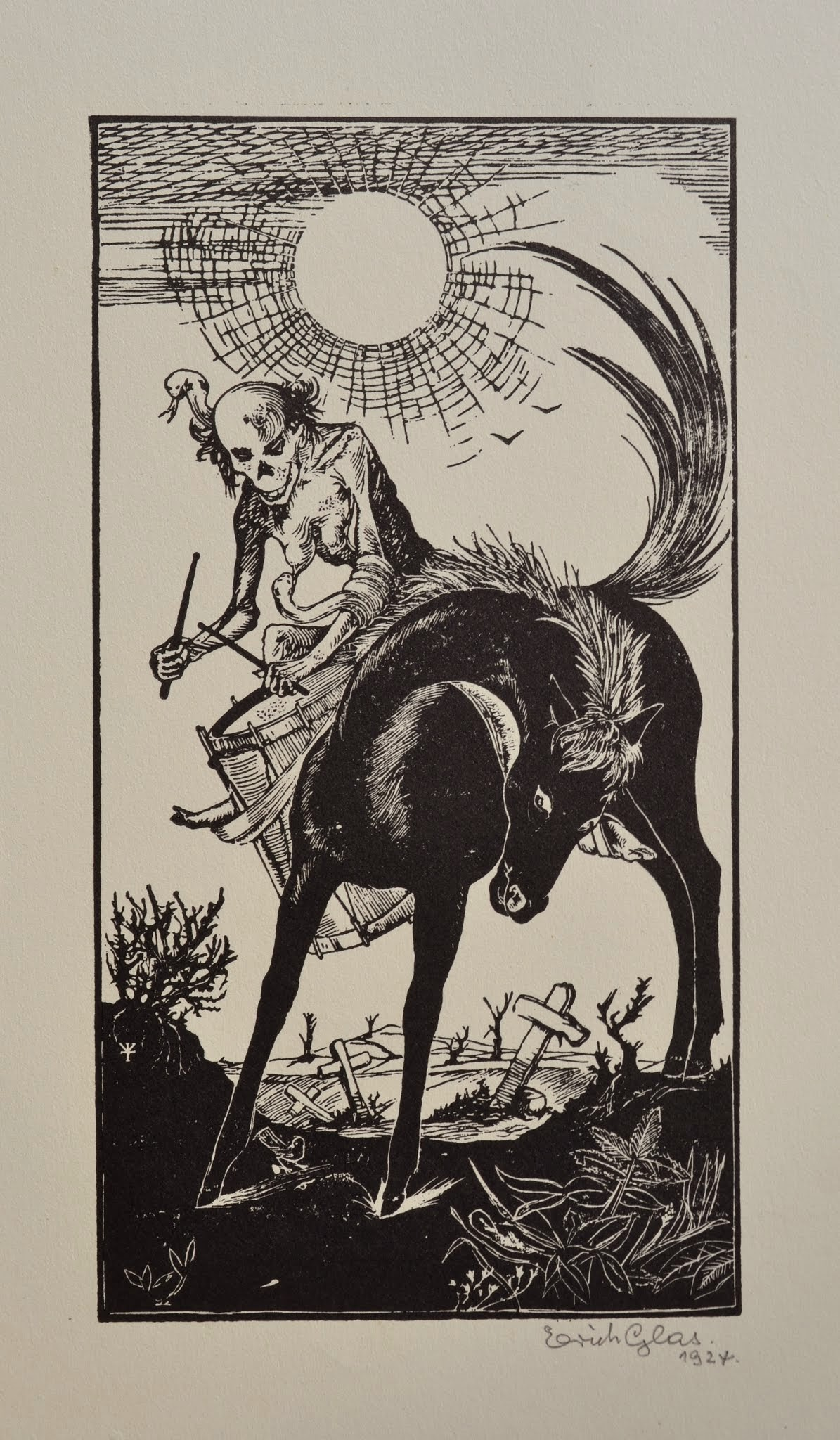
The devil rides in Flanders (1924), Etching

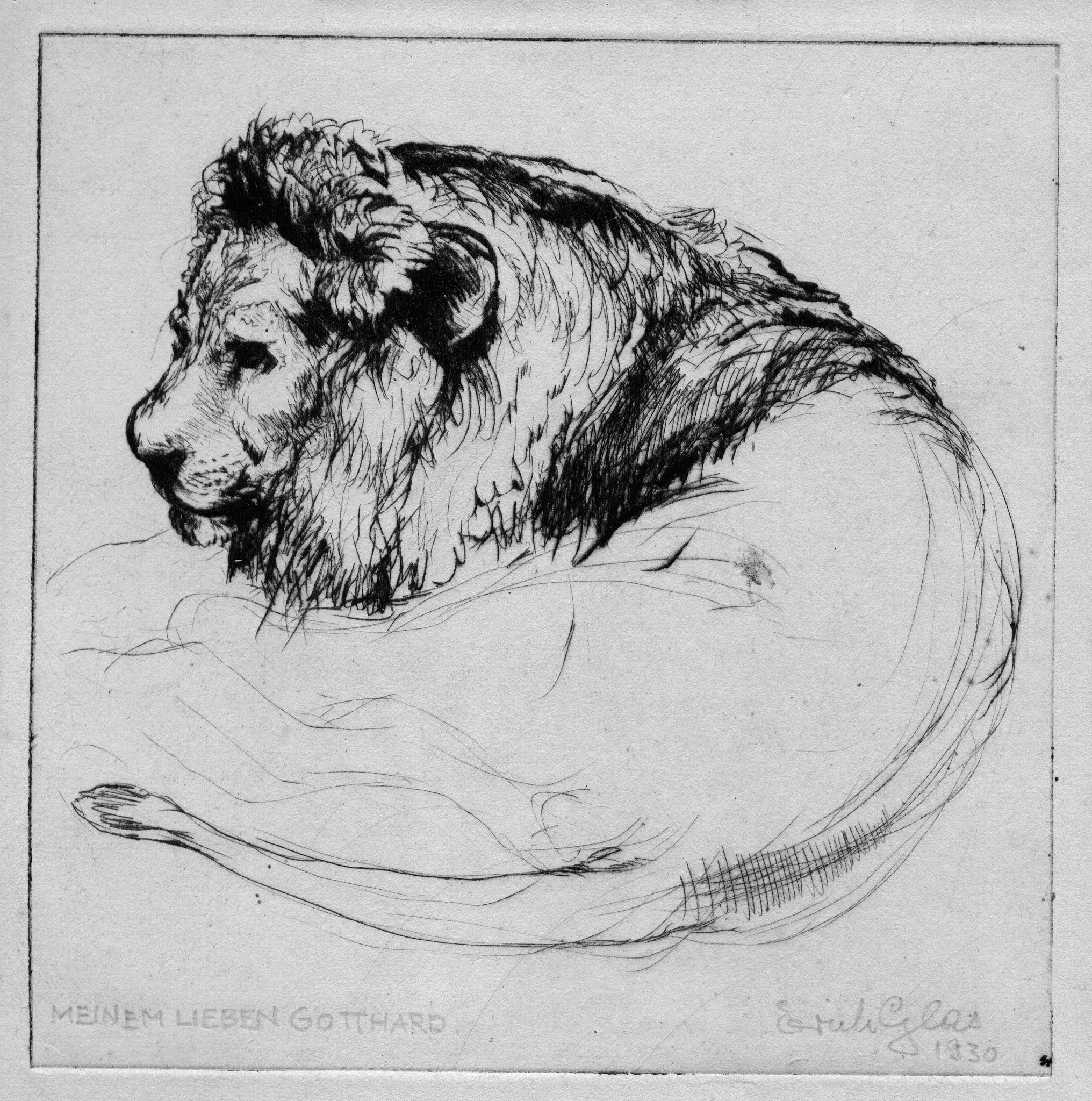
Lion (1930), Etching

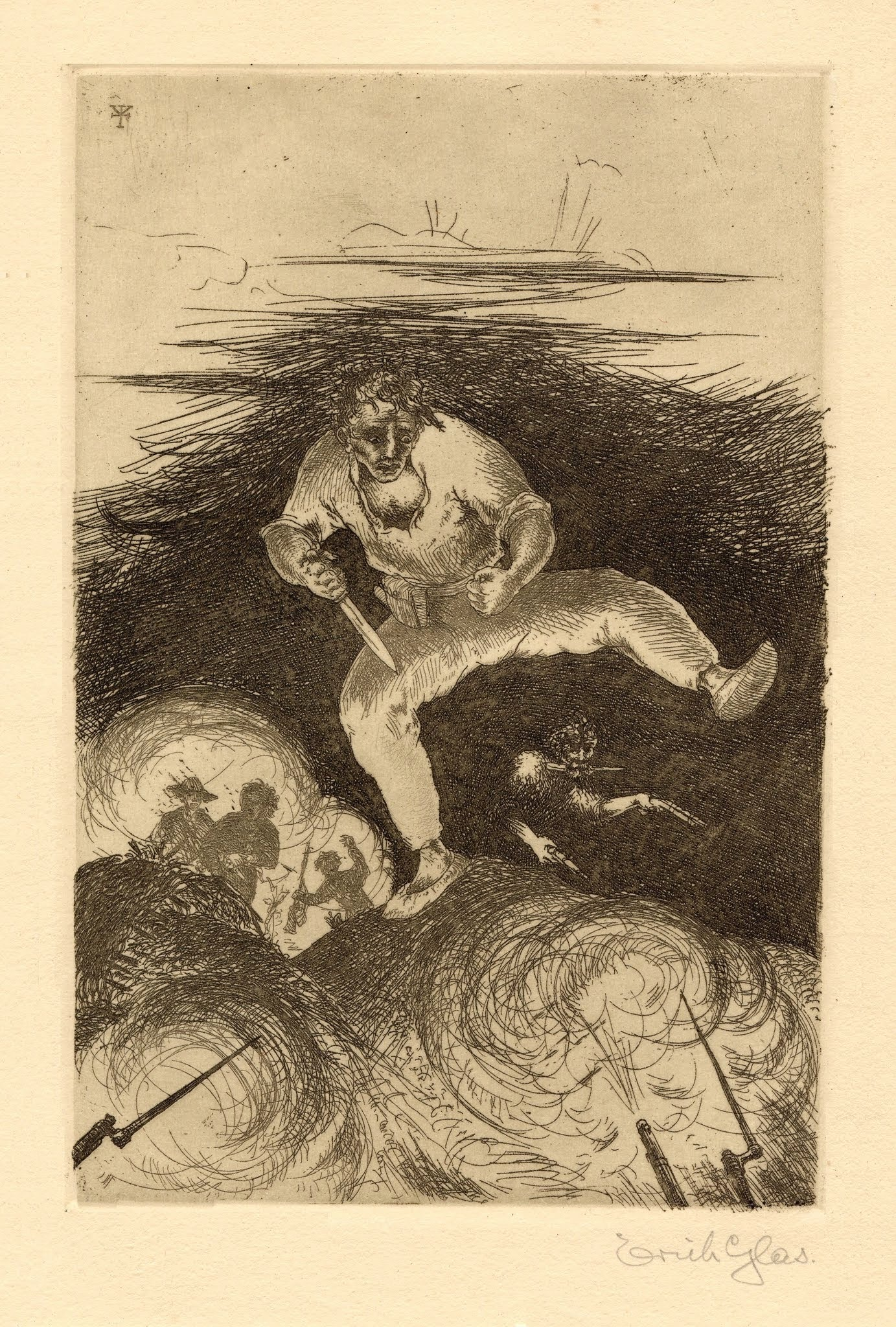
Against the forces of nature (1925), Etching, from the book Das Kajütenbuch

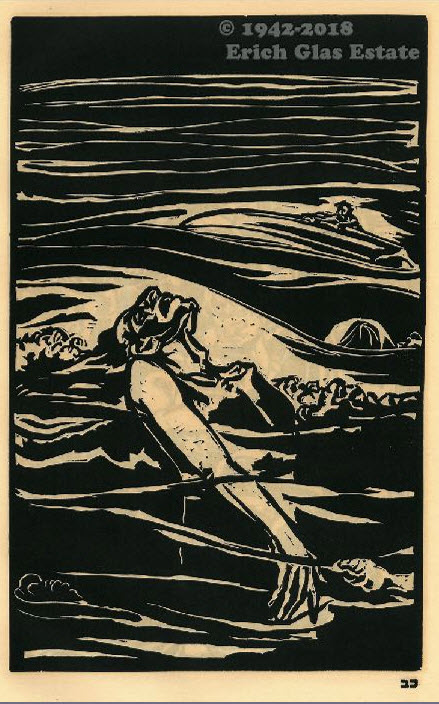
Leilot: The end (1945), Linocut

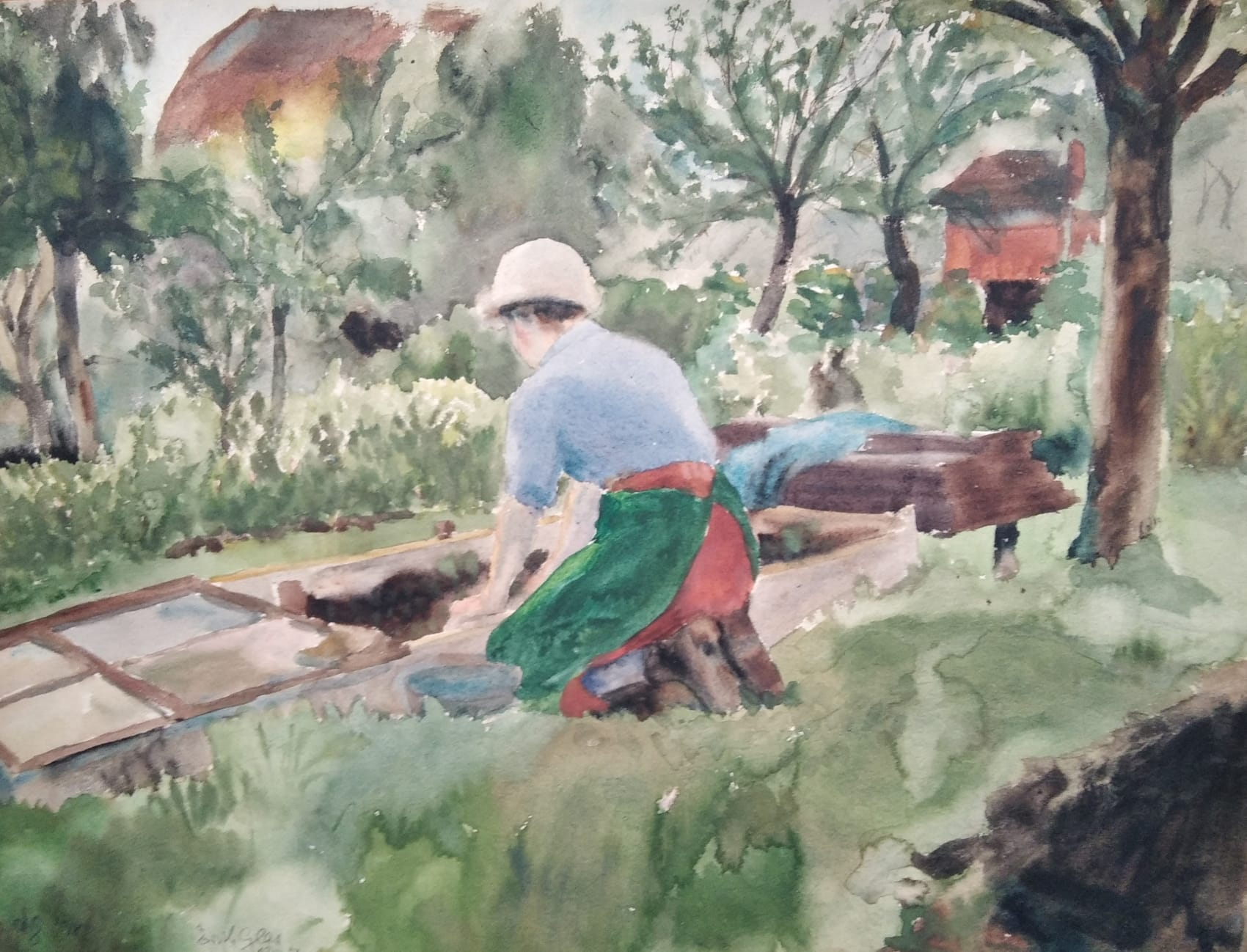
A small garden in Weimar, Watercolor

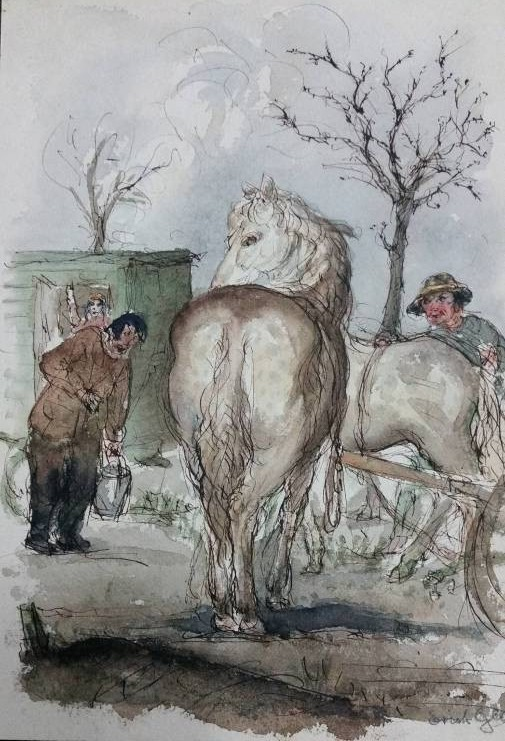
The View from the Tail, Watercolor

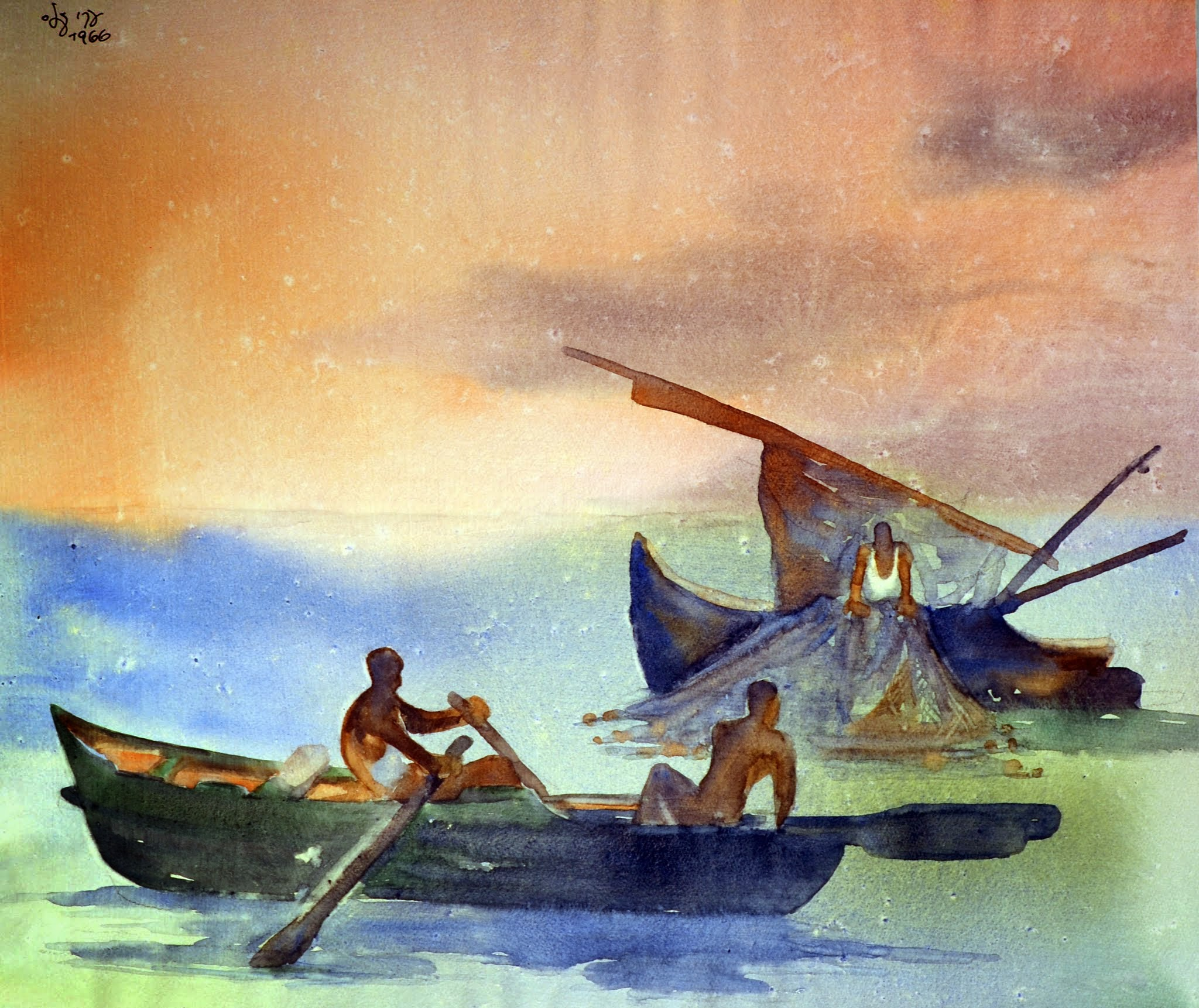
Fishermen in the old port of Acre (1966), Watercolor

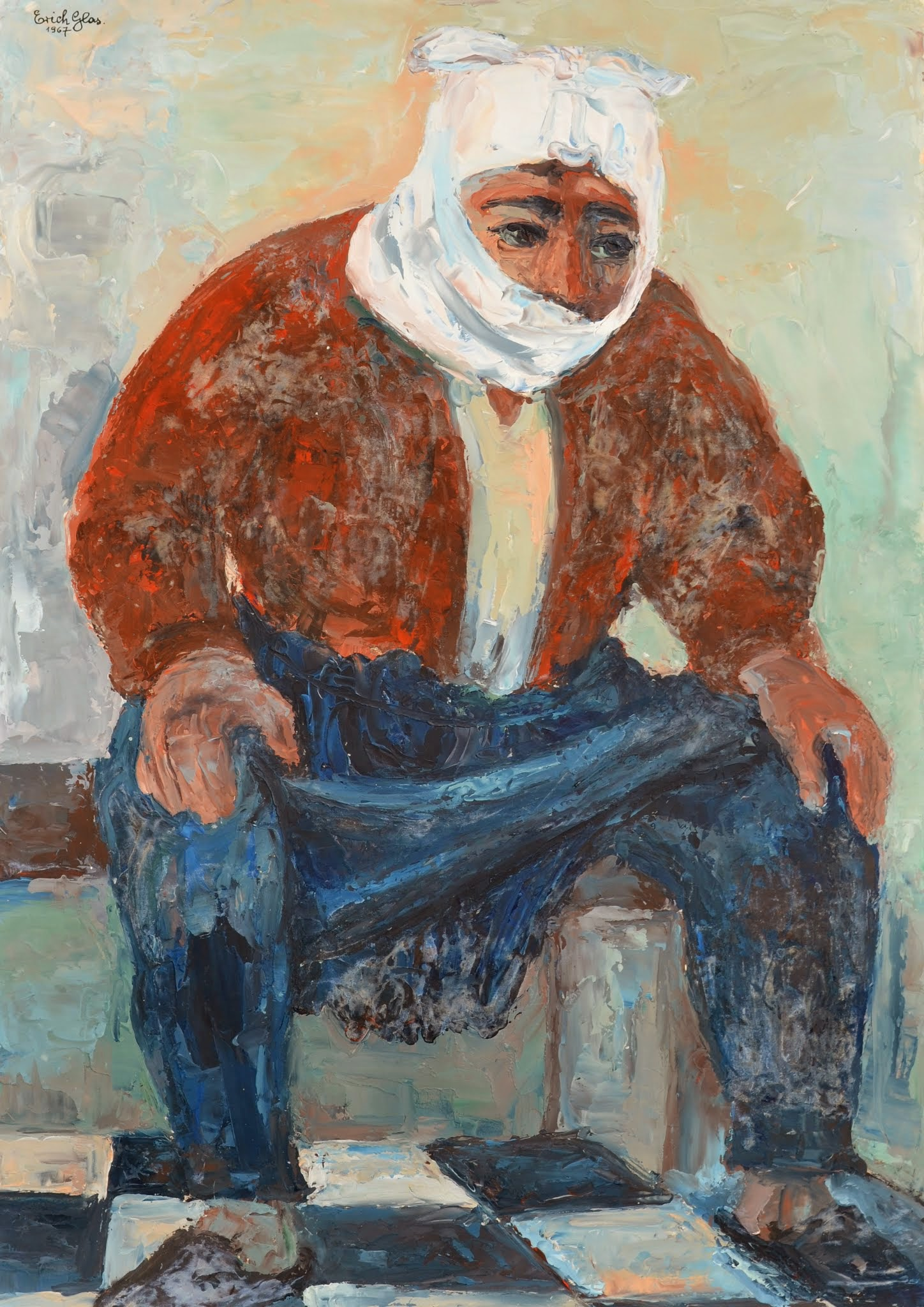
An Arab man seated in Acre (1967), Oil paint

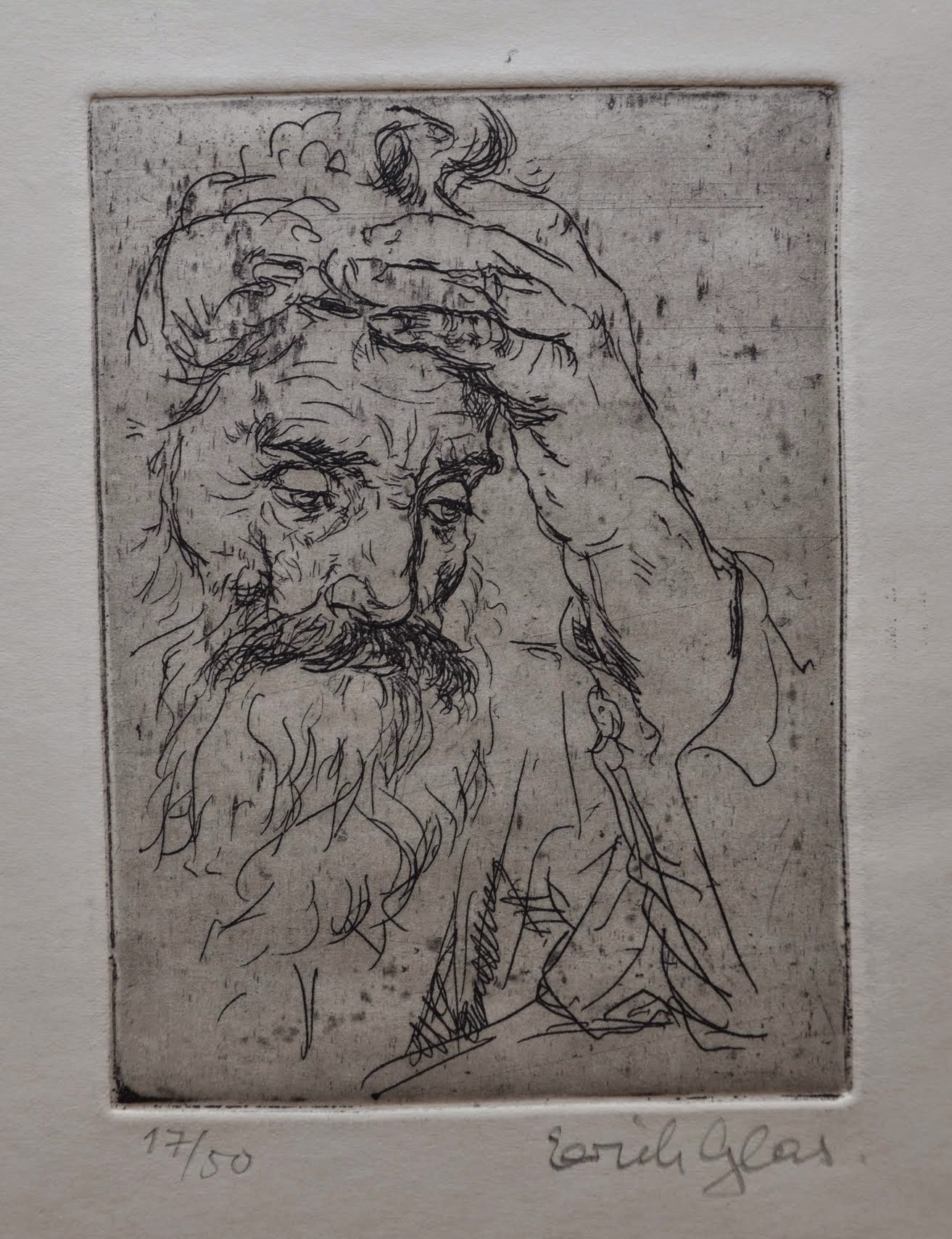
Portrait of an old man, Etching

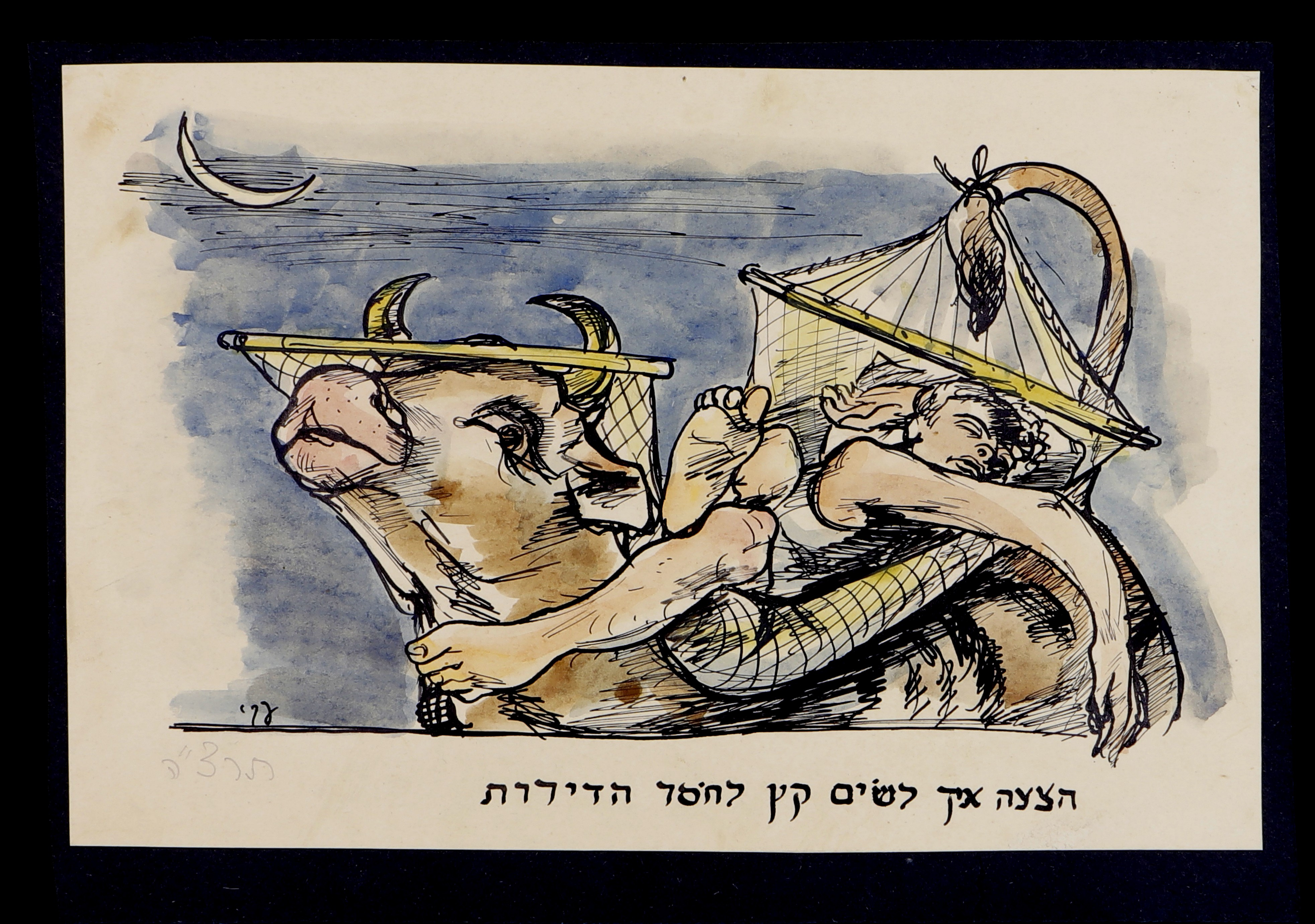
Solving the housing crisis in Kibbutz Yagur (1935), Cartoon

Grace for meals: a call to the Kibbutz Yagur dining hall (1941), Cartoon

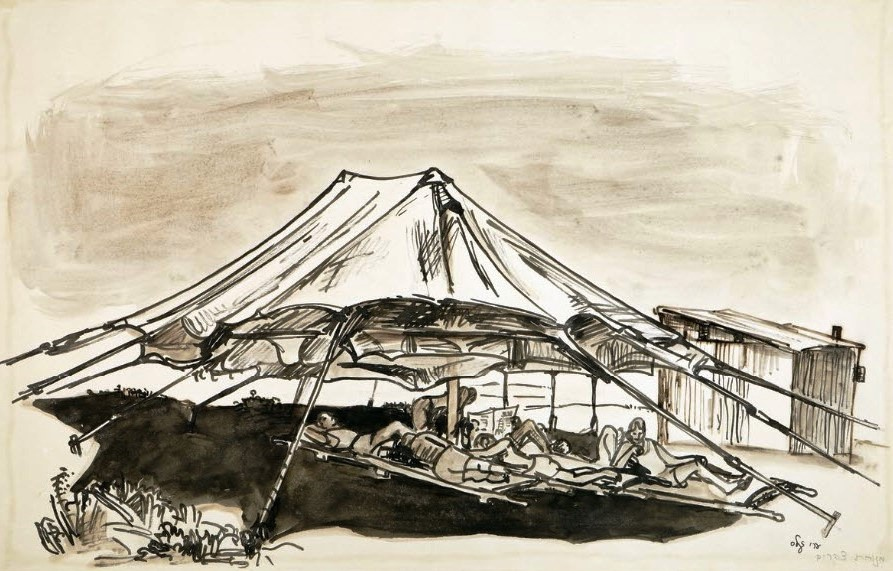
Noontime rest: Detainees from Kibbutz Yagur in a British detention camp (1946), Illustration

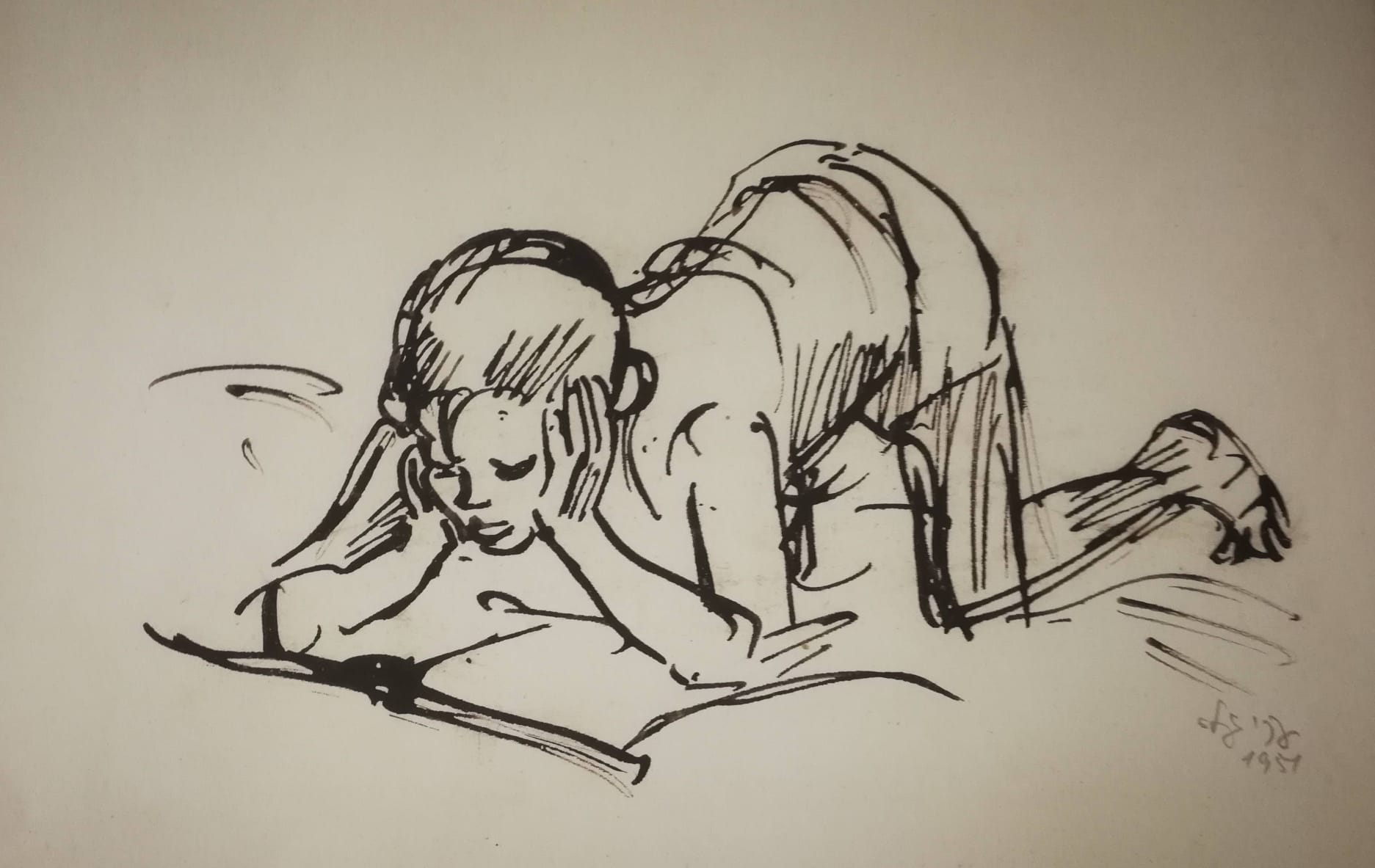
Deep in the story (1951), Brush drawing

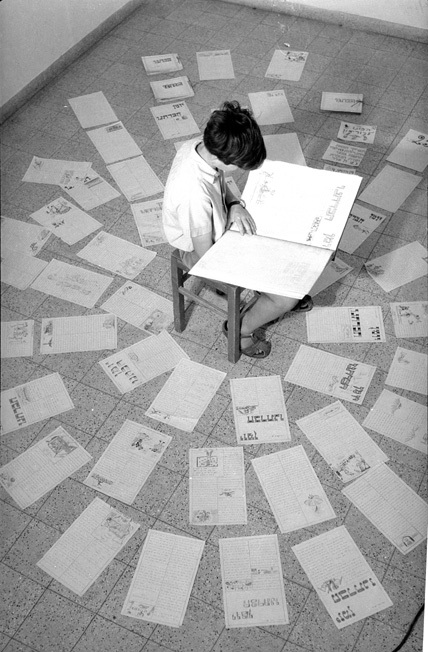
Circled by words, Photography
