= Uziel Gal =

Israeli firearm designer (1923–2002)

- עוזיאל גל
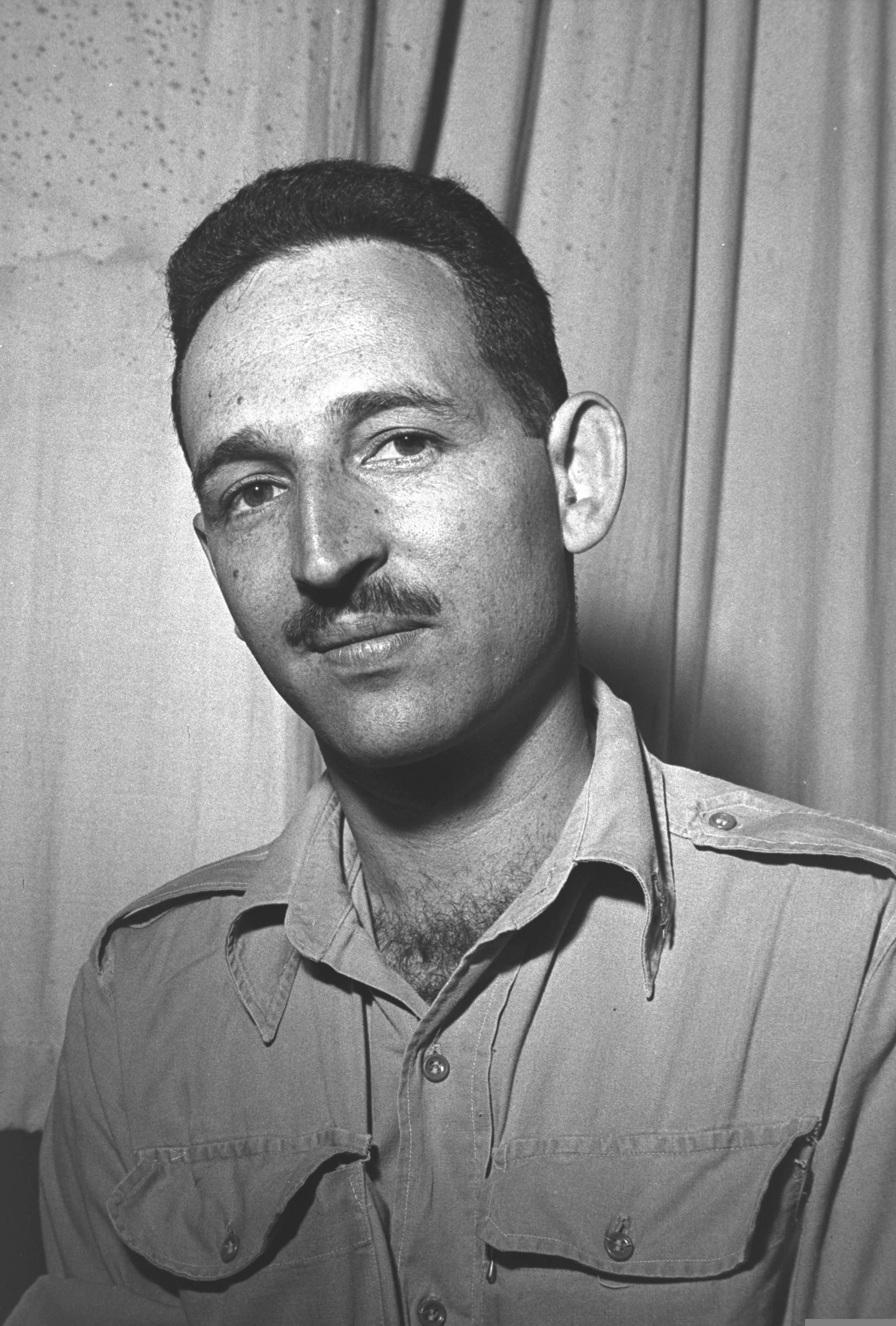
- Gal in 1953
- Born: Gotthard Glas; 15 December 1923; Weimar, Thuringia, Germany
- Died: 7 September 2002 (aged 78); Philadelphia, Pennsylvania, US
- Occupation: Weapon designer
- Years active: c. 1948–2002
- Known for: Designing the Uzi submachine gun
- Spouse: Ahuva Frankel (m. 1956; died 1998)
- Children: 2
- Military career
- Allegiance: Israel
- Branch: Israel Defence Forces
- Service years: c. 1936–1975
- Rank: Colonel

Uziel "Uzi" Gal (Hebrew: עוזיאל "עוזי" גל, born Gotthard Glas; 15 December 1923 – 7 September 2002) was a German-born Israeli firearm designer who invented and became the eponym of the Uzi submachine gun.

== Early life ==
Gal was born in Weimar, Germany, to Mila-Maria "Miela" Glas (née Zacharias-Langhans) and Erich Glas. His father, an illustrator and former German Army pilot, was a Jewish native of Berlin while his mother, a gardener, was an Evangelical Christian from Hamburg, whose grandparents were Jewish. His parents divorced early in their son's childhood and Gal was given into the custody of his mother, living with her next to the Haus am Horn. He remained close with his father, who shared his interest in weapons, both in firearms and medieval weapons such as longswords, rapiers, bows, and crossbows. He spent much of his childhood at his father's house in Munich and by age ten, Gal had become adept in gunsmithing and archery.

In 1933, following Adolf Hitler's rise to power, Gal's father Erich emigrated to England with his second wife, where the couple obtained a visa to travel to Mandatory Palestine. Gal had been attending a Jewish summer camp in London with his school at the time and as a return to Germany was deemed unsafe, he remained there until 1936, when he was allowed to join his father in their new home in the kibbutz Yagur. He attended school in Nesher and continued his hobby in weapons with a friend, obtaining their first firearm, a Beretta handgun, by trading it from their former teacher for a pair of Zeiss binoculars. At age 15, Gal built an automatic arrow-thrower, after which he began stealing mechanical parts from the local locksmith to assemble a homemade gun. He was caught in the process and severely beaten by the adult workers as a result. While still in his teenage years, he joined the Haganah.

In 1943, Gal, by then part of the Haganah's Palmach unit, was scoping out British Army facilities in hopes of acquiring better weapons parts, seeking to make a superior alternative to the military's Sten submachine guns, which the Haganah found unreliable and unwieldy. The same year, he was arrested by British authorities after he was caught with a bag containing several guns amid a firearm carrying ban and was sentenced to seven years at Acre Prison, where he maintained his mechanical engineering studies and kept working on gun designs. However, Gal ultimately only served 2.5 years before receiving a pardon and being released in July 1946. In the early 1950s, he officially hebraized his name to Uziel Gal, taking inspiration from his father, who had renamed himself Uri Gal upon his immigration.

== Career ==
After his release, Gal joined the Israel Defense Forces, serving in the 1948 Arab–Israeli War, stationed in Galilee, during which he reached the rank of lieutenant. In 1949, Gal underwent officer training before becoming employed by Israel Weapon Industries. IWI tasked Gal and Chaim Kara, the later head of the light weapons division of the IDF, with the creation of a new submachine gun to replace the Sten models currently in use. Gal primarily drew on the submachine guns produced by Českoslovenká zbrojovka, particularly the Samopal 23/25 SMG designs by Jaroslav Václav Holeček and the ZK 476 pistol by Josef and František Koucký, which he incorporated into his pre-existing designs.

In 1951, two prototypes were created, the Kara and the Uzi, after their respective creators. The Kara was officially designated the K-12, while the Uzi remained known under its informal name. The K-12 was initially well received for its design, weight and ergonomics, but fell out of favor due to its high cost and effort in production. The same year, the Uzi was put through the first test trials by the Israel Defense Forces, starting with five copies before increasing the number to eighty. In 1952, Gal patented the weapons design as the Uzi, though production rights remained with the Ministry of Defense. Gal did not want the weapon to be named after him but his request was denied. Gal stopped publicly using the nickname Uzi and made a habit of only introducing himself by his surname. In March 1954, mass production of the Uzi began, with an order of 8,000 weapons and 80,000 magazines by the Ordnance Corps. In 1955, he was decorated with the Tzalash haRamatkal and in 1958, Gal was the first person to receive the Israel Security Prize, presented to him by Prime Minister David Ben-Gurion for his work on the Uzi.

Gal retired from the IDF as lieutenant colonel in 1975, and moved to the United States the following year. He settled in Philadelphia with his second wife Ahuva so that his daughter, Tamar, who had a serious brain disorder, could receive extended medical treatment there until her death in 1984.

In the early 1980s, Gal assisted in the creation of the Ruger MP9 submachine gun.

In 1990, Gal served in the production of Terminator 2: Judgment Day, serving as one of the firearms instructors to Linda Hamilton, also teaching her hand-to-hand combat techniques.

Gal continued his work as a firearms designer in the United States until his death from cancer in 2002. His body was flown back to Yagur for burial.
