= Yagur =

Kibbutz in northern Israel

Yagur: יָגוּר (Hebrew)
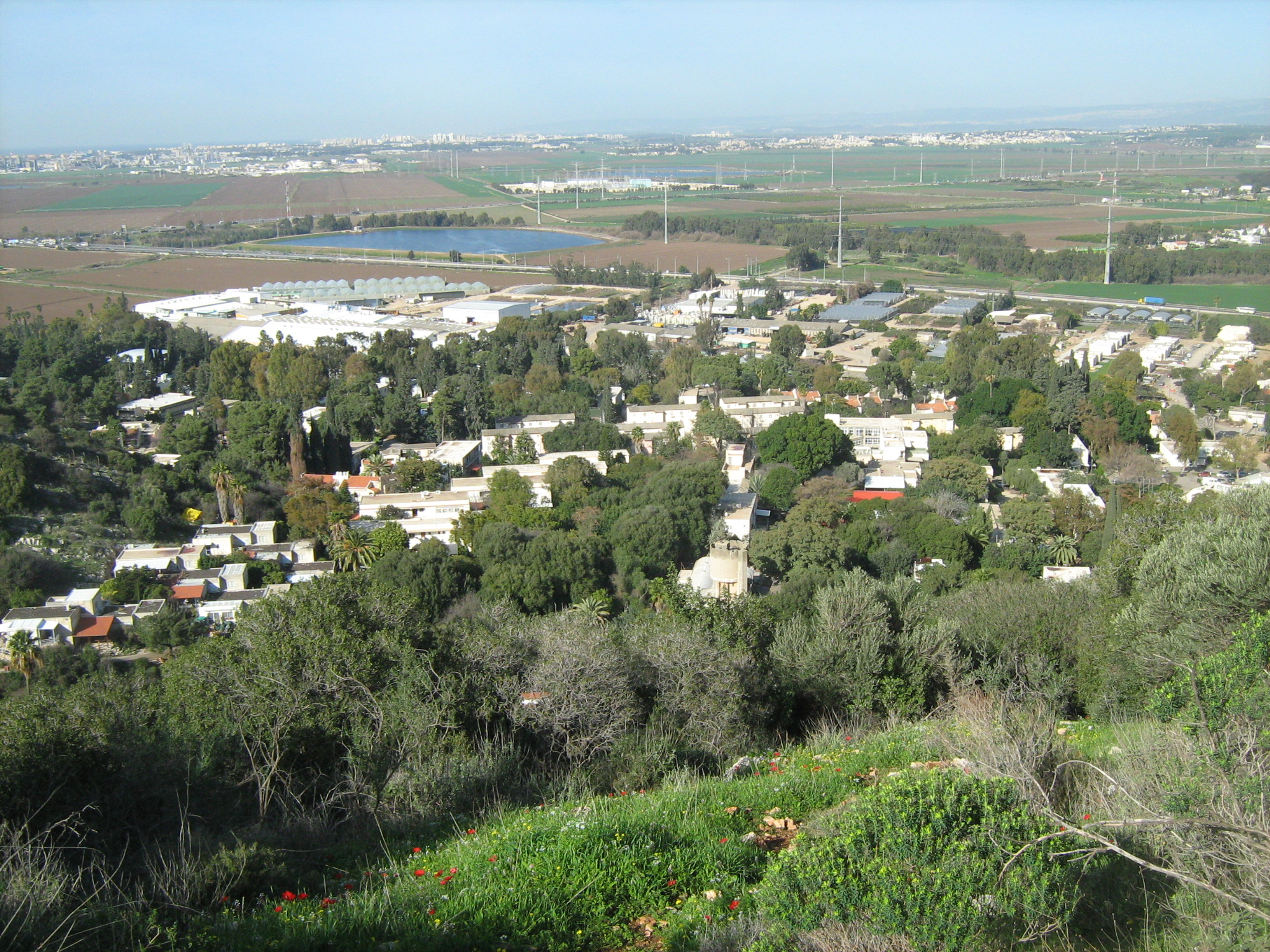

- Location within Haifa region of Israel Location within Israel
- Coordinates: 32°44′29″N 35°4′38″E
- Country: Israel
- District: Haifa
- Subdistrict: Haifa
- Council: Zevulun
- Affiliation: Kibbutz Movement
- Founded: 1922
- Founder: Ahva members
- Population (2024): 1,507
- Website: www.yagur.com

Yagur (Hebrew: יָגוּר) is a kibbutz in northern Israel. Located on the northeastern slopes of Mount Carmel, about 9 km southeast of Haifa, it falls under the jurisdiction of Zevulun Regional Council. In 2024 it had a population of 1,507, making it one of the two largest kibbutzim in the country.

== Name ==
The name Yagur was taken by the founding members from a nearby Arab village called "Yajur". There is a site with a similar name (Yagur) mentioned in the Book of Joshua (Josh 15:21), though it was located in territory belonging to the Tribe of Judah, far to the south.

== History ==
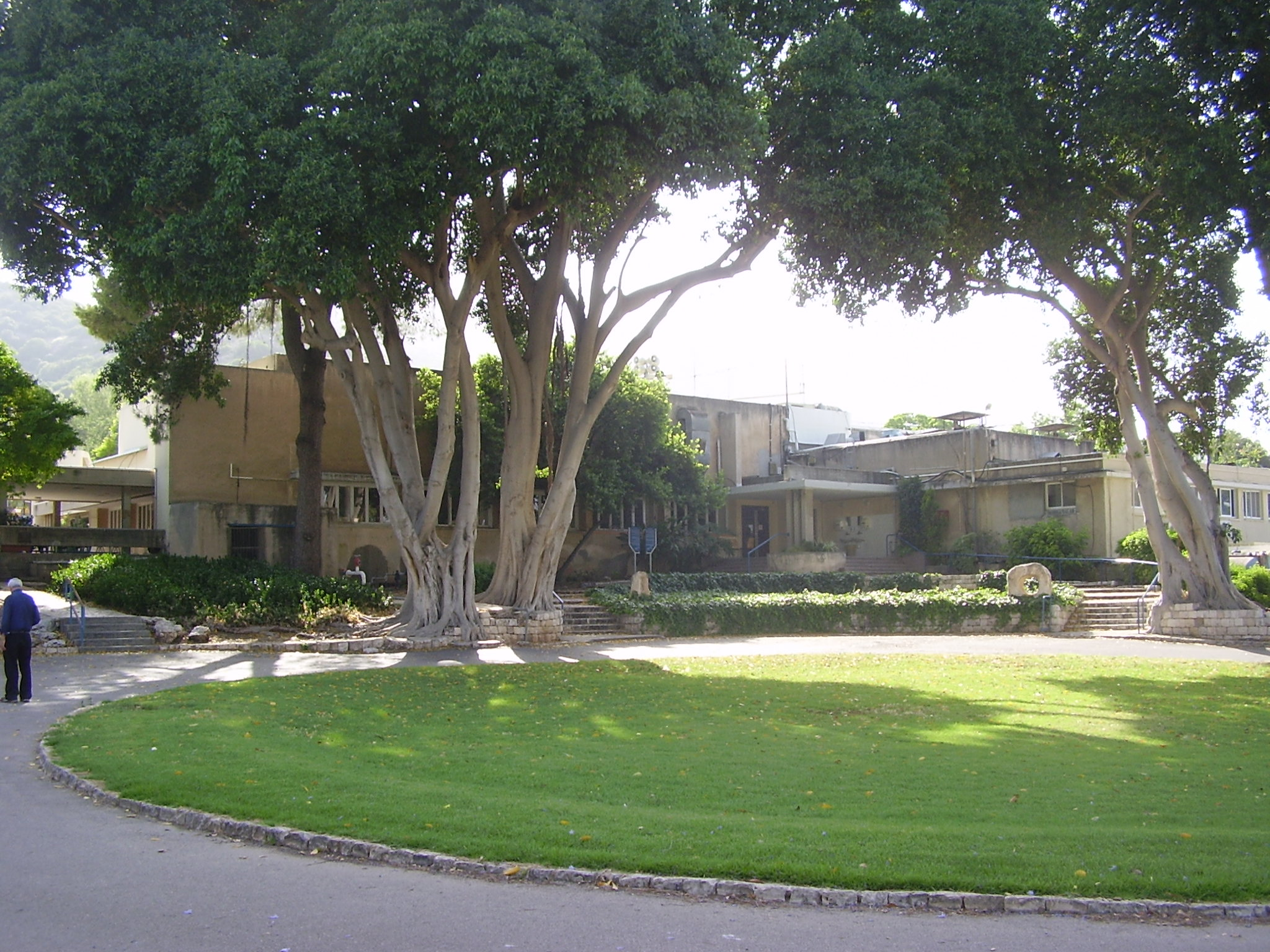
Communal dining hall, Kibbutz Yagur

Yagur was founded in 1922 by a settlement group called Ahva (Brotherhood).

At first, the members worked drying up the swamps surrounding the Kishon River and preparing the land for permanent settlement. They established various agricultural divisions and the kibbutz began to grow.

On 11 April 1931 three members of the kibbutz were killed by members of a cell of the Black Hand.

During the Mandate era, Yagur was an important center for the Haganah. During Operation Agatha on 29 June 1946, the British army conducted a major raid on the kibbutz and located a major arms depot hidden there after receiving a tip from informants. More than 300 rifles, some 100 2-inch mortars, more than 400,000 bullets, some 5,000 grenades and 78 revolvers were confiscated. Many members of the kibbutz were arrested.

== Economy ==
The economy is now based on diversified agriculture and industry. The kibbutz operates a 5-month work-study program for young adults (18-28) in which participants learn conversational Hebrew and work in the kibbutz.

== Notable people ==
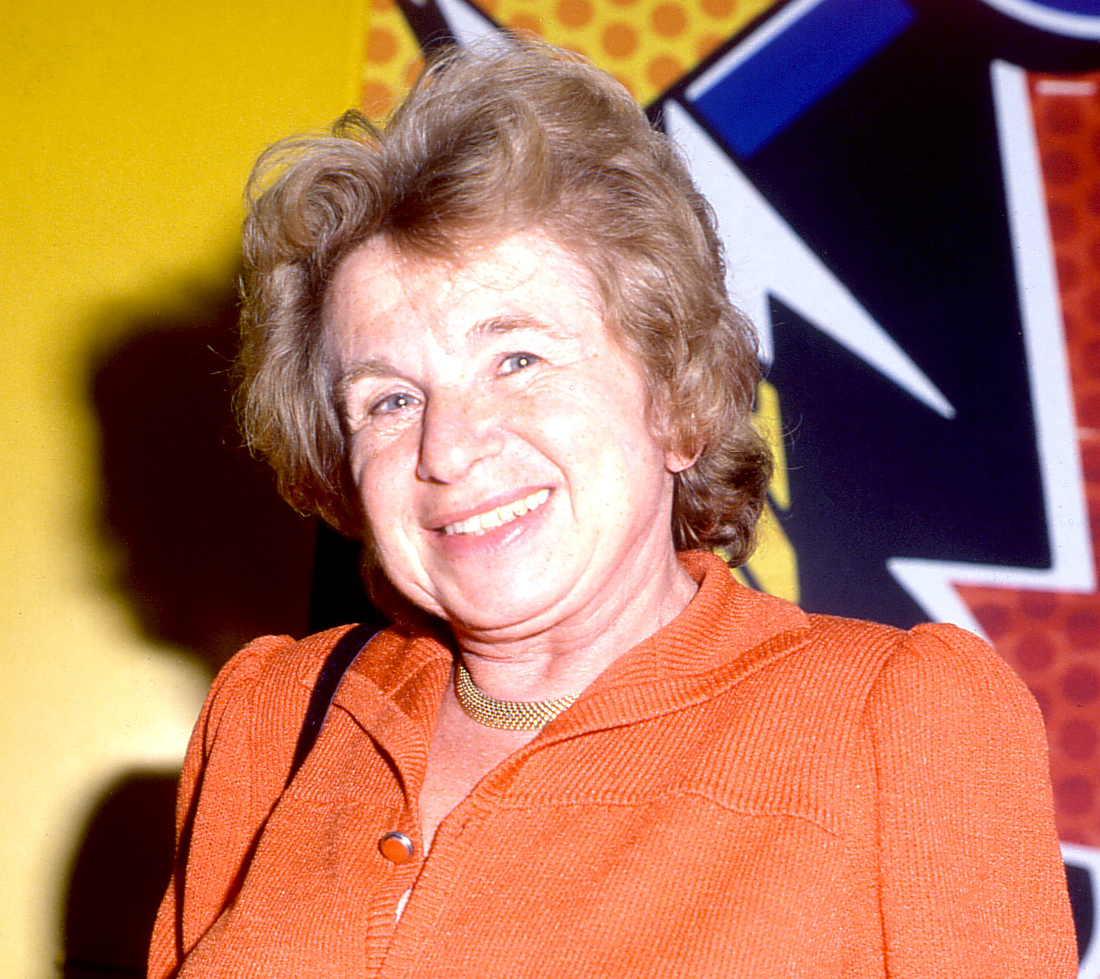
Ruth Westheimer (Dr. Ruth)

- Yisrael Bar-Yehuda (1895–1965), Knesset member
- Erich Glas (1897–1973), artist
- Uziel Gal (1923–2002), designer of the Uzi submachine gun
- Yoel Marcus (1932–2022), Haaretz commentator
- Itamar Marzel (born 1949), basketball player
- Yoram Taharlev (1938–2022), poet, lyricist, author
- Ruth Westheimer German-American sex therapist
- Assaf Yaguri (1931–2000), Knesset member

== Gallery ==
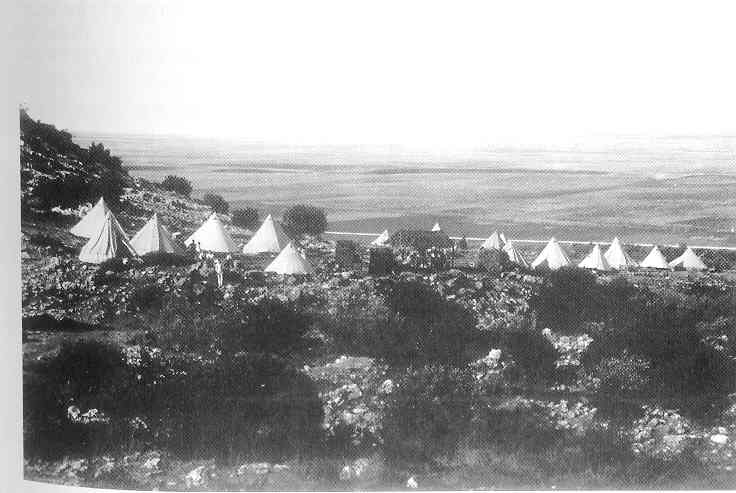
Shomeria pioneer group at Yagur, 1921

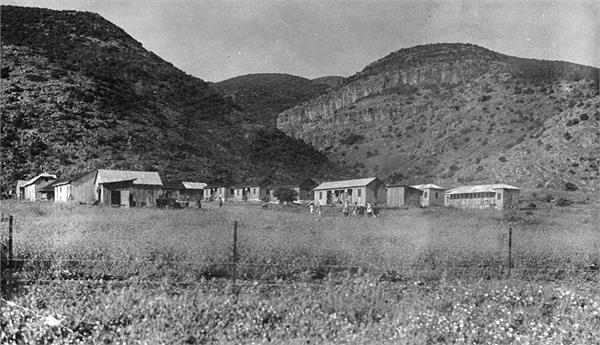
Yagur 1926

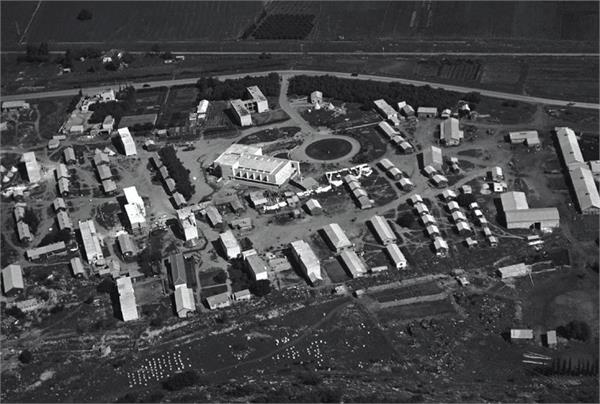
Yagur 1939

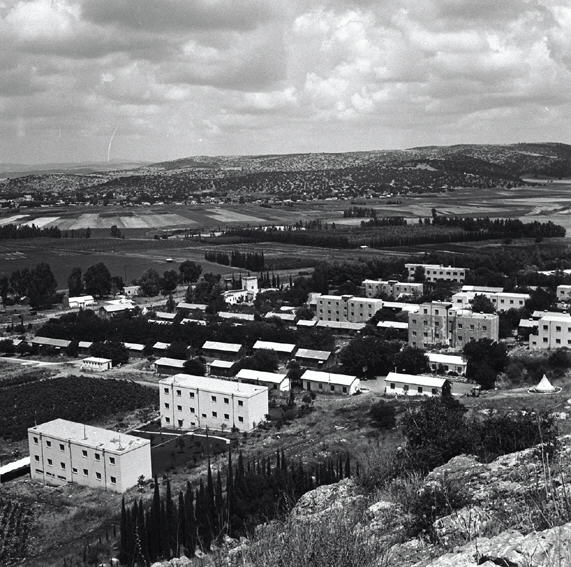
Yagur 1945

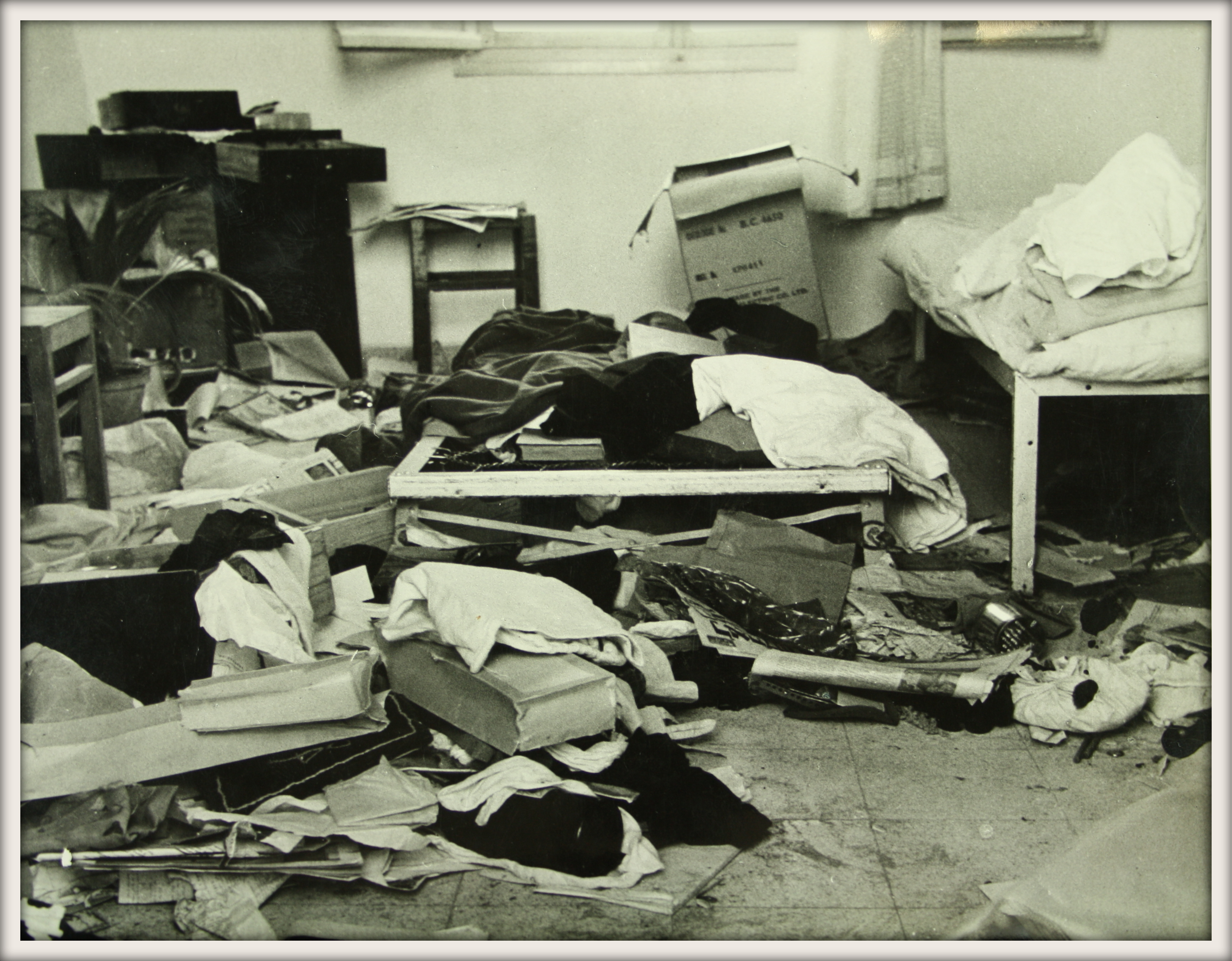
A room in Kibbutz Yagur after a weapon search conducted during Operation Agatha.

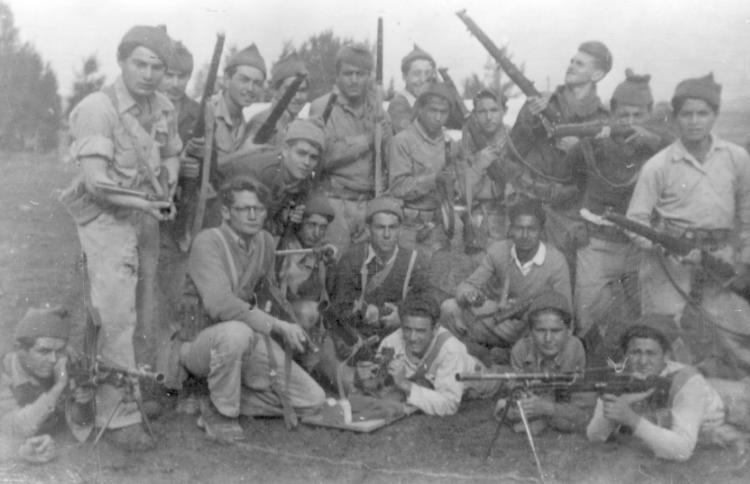
Members of the Yiftach Brigade training at Yagur, 1948

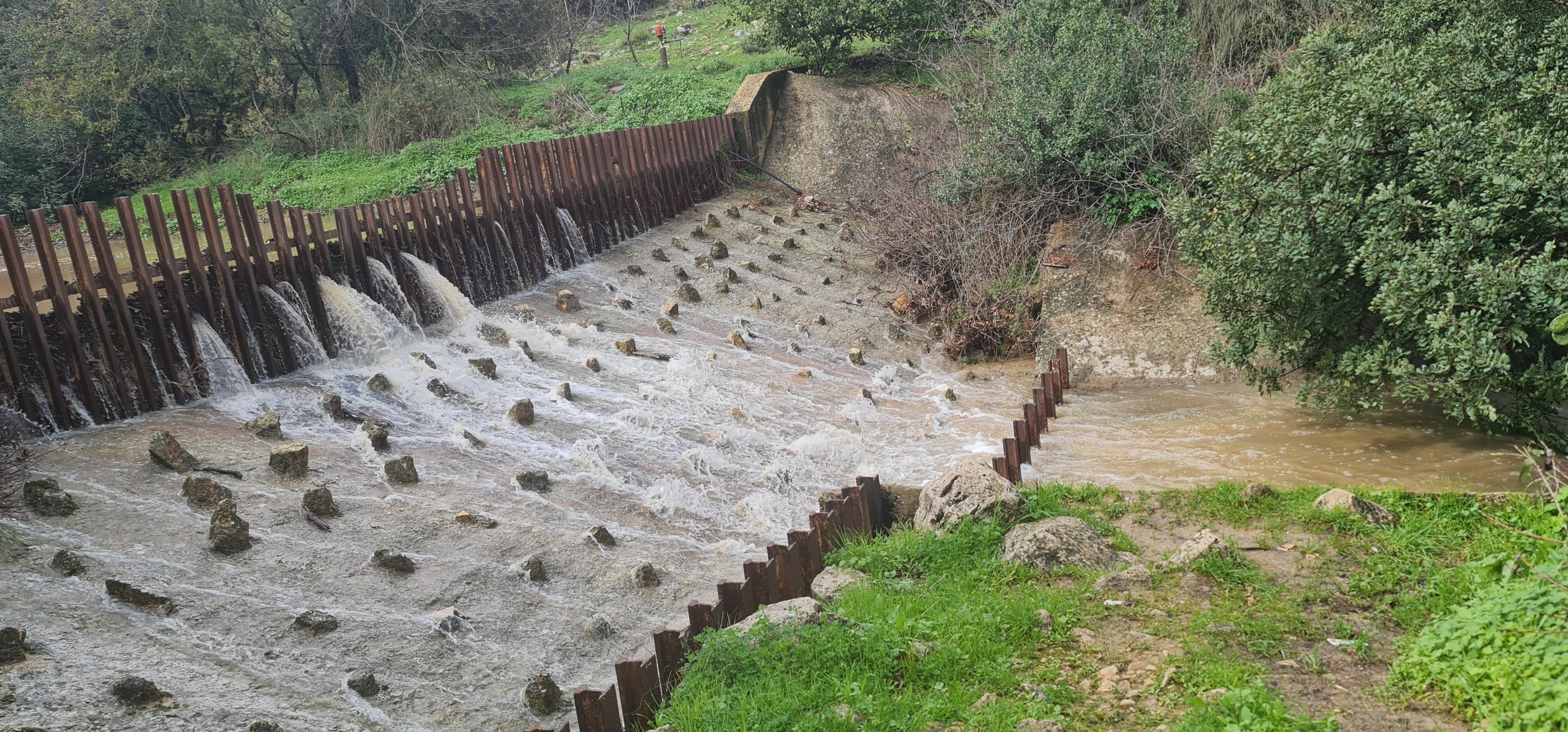
Nahal Yagur after rainfall
