= Slick chick =

Slick Chick is a nickname that can refer to:

- The Slick Chick, a "Merrie Melodies" cartoon animated short
- Slick Chick (pinball), a 1963 pinball machine
- RF-100A, a 1954 jet fighter aircraft
- a Texas Holdem poker hand consisting of an ace and a queen

== See also ==
- Slick Chicks, an underwear company
