= Slick Chicks =

Adaptive underwear

- Type: Private
- Industry: Retail
- Founder: Helya Mohammadian
- Headquarters: New York, New York, United States
- Area served: Worldwide
- Products: Clothing
- Website: slickchicksonline.com

Slick Chicks is a patented adaptive underwear that is designed to empower people with a disability or physical challenge. They feature hook-and-eye fasteners at the waistband, so anyone can seamlessly transition in and out of their clothing, regardless of their physical situation.

== History ==
In 2012, Mohammadian applied for a patent on 'Underwear with refastenable side attachments', the fastening technology used in Slick Chicks products. The patent was granted on April 9, 2019.

After two years of research, design, and testing, Slick Chicks came to market in 2014.

By 2015, Slick Chicks launched an e-commerce site, selling their three styles: bikini brief, thong and boy short. In August of that same year, Slick Chicks filed for a trademark. This trademark was granted in August 2017 for use in commerce, specifically lingerie.

In June 2016, Slick Chicks launched on Kickstarter, seeking $15,000. The project was successfully funded and raised a total of $17,672.

In June 2017, Mohammadian appeared on Steve Harvey's FUNDERDOME to pitch Slick Chicks to the studio audience. She won over the audience and the prize of $6,500.

In April 2019, Slick Chicks founder Mohammadian was granted a patent for the undergarments.
