= Karl Adler =

Karl Adler (September 8, 1873 in Munich; died November 22, 1938 in Dachau concentration camp) was a war veteran, bedspring manufacturer, art collector and patron.

== Life ==
=== Childhood and Family ===
Karl Adler was born in Munich as the fourth child of the married couple Maier Löw and Sofia Adler (née Rosengart). His mother died when he was six years old. Together with two partners, his father was the founder and owner of the bedding factory J. Schöpflich & Adler. While little is known about Karl Adler's childhood and youth, there is evidence to suggest that Karl grew up in a household with an affinity for art. There is a portrait of his father by the Munich painter Leo Putz and his mother's brother was married to the sister of Heinrich Thannhauser, who was one of the most influential gallery owners and art dealers in Germany.

=== Art Collector ===
Together with his brother Max, Karl Adler became co-owner and partner of Adler Bettfedernfabrik, which his father had founded. With almost 80 employees, the company was the largest of its kind in Munich. In December 1905, Karl married the daughter of a Munich merchant, Emilie Silbermann. The couple had five children and moved into a villa on the banks of the Isar in Munich in April 1923.

Karl and Emilie Adler furnished their house in Munich-Harlaching with valuable paintings, furniture, handicrafts, sculptures and oriental carpets, some of which they had acquired on Karl's business trips around the world. However, Karl Adler was above all a collector of graphic art and concentrated on modern art.

The Adler couple were supported, inspired and advised by their son-in-law Erich Glas, a modern artist who learned his craft at the Staatliche Kunstgewerbeschule in Munich and the Bauhaus in Weimar and whose prints were also represented in the Adler Collection.

=== Sponsor, mentor and friendships with young artists ===
The Adler's collection grew to become one of the largest known compilations of prints and etchings of its time.

Their collection included Lovis Corinth, Olaf Gulbransson, Oskar Kokoschka, Käthe Kollwitz, Alfred Kubin, Edwin Scharff, Josef Scharl, Max Slevogt und Karl Schmidt-Rottluff.

Adler collected works by Kubin and represented him as a dealer as well.

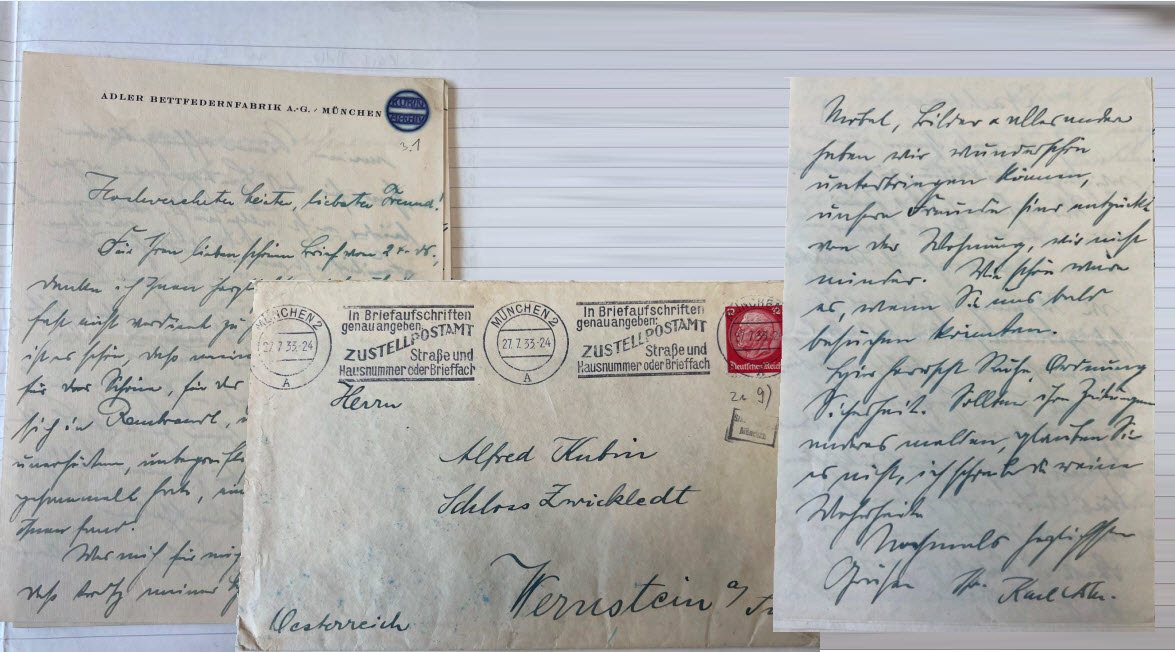
Correspondence between Karl Adler und Alfred Kubin.

=== Nazi era ===
After Hitler came to power in 1933, the Jewish family was increasingly targeted by the National Socialists. Karl's eldest brother and co-owner of the bedspring factory Max Adler was taken into “protective custody” for a few days and monitored after his release. Karl's son-in-law and friend Erich Glas lost his teaching position in Berlin. The bedspring factory also became the target of anti-Semitic boycotts. Karl Adler's sons, his daughter Susanne and her husband Erich Glas escaped Germany and emigrated to Palestine. Karl and his wife Emilie, however, remained in Munich.

In August 1938, Karl and Max Adler were forced to close the bed feather factory. After the company was deleted from the Munich commercial register, the Adler bedspring factory was taken over, or “Aryanized”, by the horsehair spinning mill Dr. Volkhardt & Cie.

=== Death ===
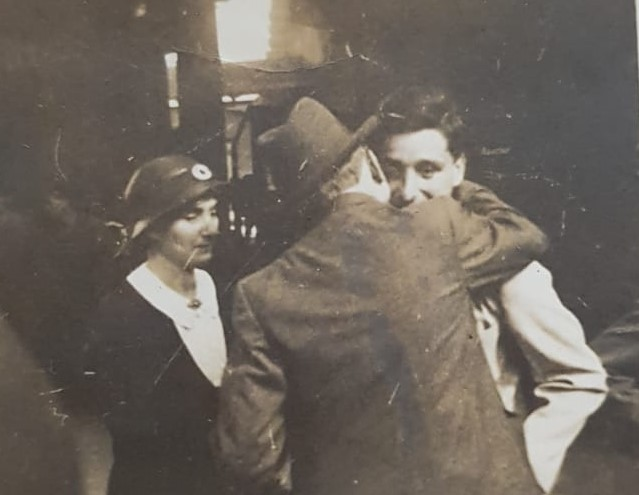
Karl Adler und seine Frau Emilie verabschieden ihren Sohn Meir vor dessen Emigration nach Palästina; München 1934.

With the help of art historians, curators and directors of the Munich museums, Karl and Emilie Adler's collection was deliberately looted by the Gestapo. Karl Adler did not live to see the confiscation of his property and art collection. He was arrested by the Gestapo on November 10, 1938, the day after the Reichspogromnacht, and taken to Dachau concentration camp. He died there on November 22, 1938 under unknown circumstances. The Book of the Dead lists him among the prisoners who died a violent death. His wife Emilie emigrated to Mandate Palestine shortly afterwards. The couple's five children succeeded in doing so as early as 1935.

== Reconditioning ==
When she left the country, Emilie Adler was only allowed to take a portrait of her husband by Josef Scharl with her. According to her, former employees and friends of the family, members of the Gestapo came several times after Karl's arrest and took away not only the numerous paintings and prints, but also valuable furniture, books and works of art. The whereabouts of the majority of the collection are still unknown today.

With the help of the Jewish Restitution Successor Organization (JRSO), Emilie Adler filed an application for restitution with the Restitution Chamber in 1960. She was demonstrably traumatized by the murder of her husband and the confiscation of her property and therefore had difficulty remembering the exact details. In addition, the Restitution Chamber had no documents listing the confiscated property. After lengthy negotiations, Emilie Adler was awarded compensation of DM 10,000, although this was only a fraction of the estimated value of the collection. In 2021, the Adler family's descendants launched a project in collaboration with the German Lost Art Foundation (Deutsches Zentrum Kulturgutverluste) to reconstruct the collection and determine its whereabouts.

== Literature ==
- Jan Schleusener: Raub von Kulturgut. Der Zugriff des NS-Staats auf jüdischen Kunstbesitz in München und seine Nachgeschichte (= Bayerische Studien zur Museumsgeschichte. Band 3). Deutscher Kunstverlag, Berlin/München 2016, ISBN 978-3-422-07366-1.
- Wolfram Selig: "Arisierung" in München: Die Vernichtung jüdischer Existenz 1937–1939. Metropol Verlag, Berlin 2004, ISBN 3-936411-33-6, S. 892–893.
