= Slick Willie =

Slick Willie or Slick Willy may refer to:

- Willie Brown (politician), former California legislator and San Francisco mayor
- Bill Clinton, former president of the United States
- W. W. Herenton, former mayor of Memphis
- Willie Sutton, a prolific bank robber
- Willy Wise, boxer
- William Nylander, NHL forward
