= SLIC =

SLIC may refer to:

- Software licensing description table, in a computer BIOS
- Sri Lanka Insurance Corporation, an insurance provider
- State Life Insurance Corporation of Pakistan
- Subaxial Injury Classification, a severity score for cervical spine trauma
- Subscriber line interface card, an electronic circuit
