= Slick (nickname) =

Slick is a nickname for:

- Slick Aguilar (born 1954), American guitarist, most notably with Jefferson Starship
- Slick Castleman (1913-1998), American Major League Baseball pitcher
- Slick Coffman (1910–2003), American Major League Baseball pitcher
- Chalmers Goodlin (1923–2005), one of the test pilots of the X-1
- Gene Host (1933-1998), American baseball pitcher
- Slick Johnson (1948-1990), American stock car racing driver
- Mark "Slick" Johnson, American professional wrestling referee
- Slick Jones (1907-1969), American jazz drummer
- Nick Kisner (born 1991), American boxer
- Bobby Leonard, former American Basketball Association and National Basketball Association player and coach
- Slick Lollar (1905-1945), National Football League player in the 1929 season
- Arthur Morton (American football) (1914-1999), American football player and college head coach
- E. R. Moulton (1900-1979), American educator, college football and baseball player and high school coach
- Slick Smith, American stock car racing driver in the 1940s and '50s
- Slick Watts (1951–2025), American basketball player
