= Slick (hiding place) =

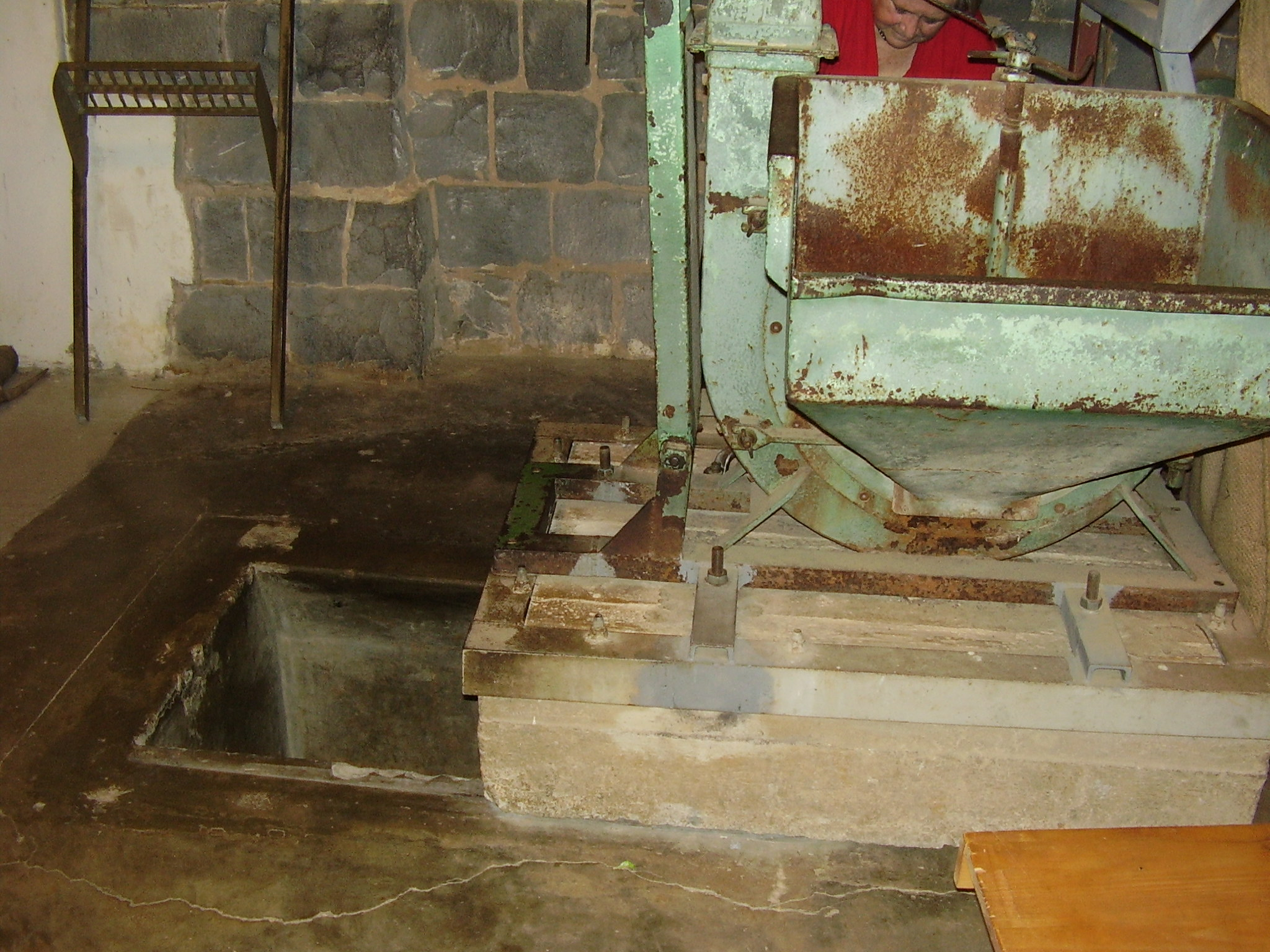
The entrance to the Haganah slick in Kfar Giladi

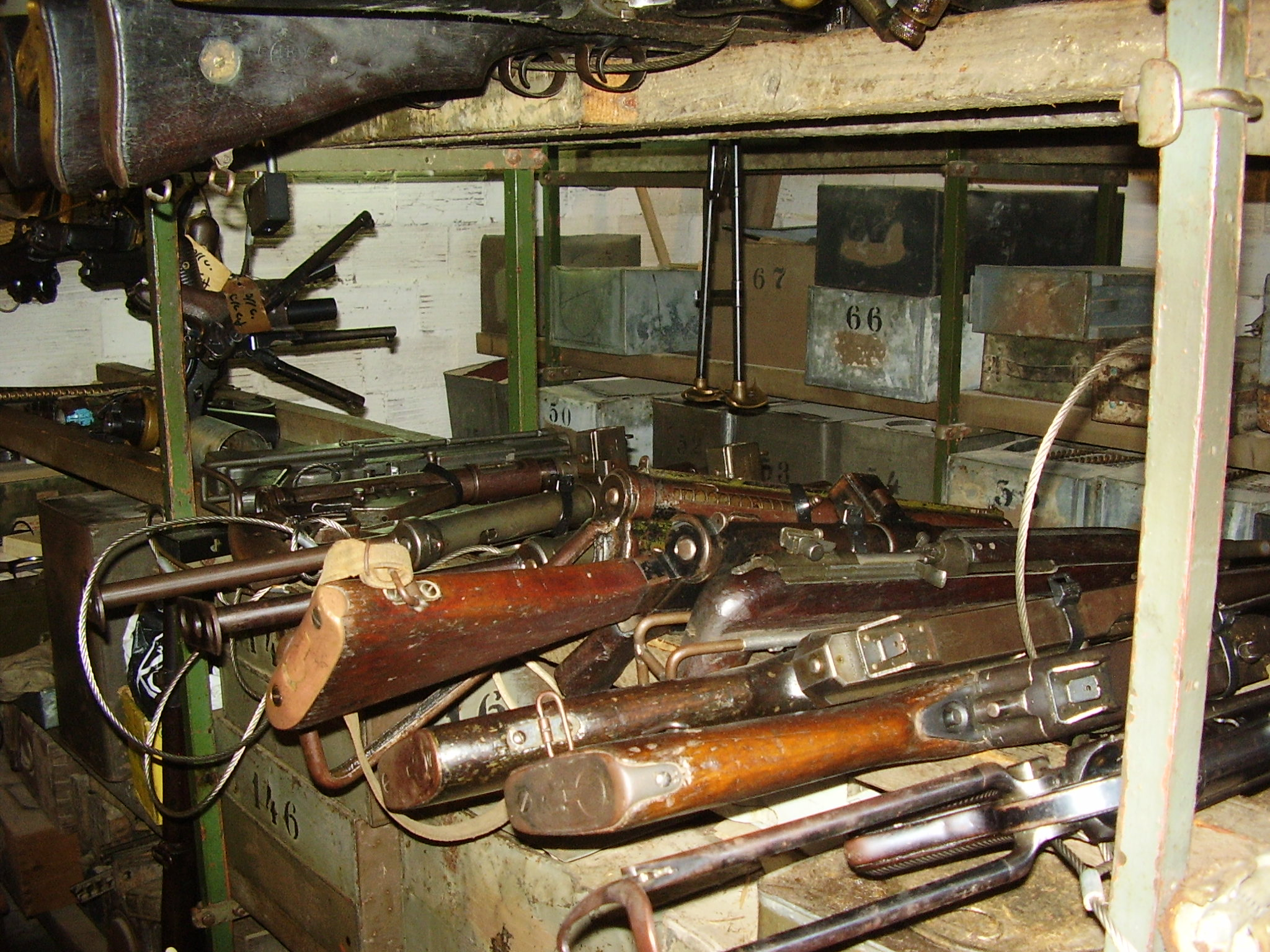
The Haganah slick in Kfar Giladi

A slick or slik (Hebrew: סליק, noun form of the Hebrew root ס-ל-ק, "to remove") is a type of hiding place for weapons. They were used by the various Jewish armed forces in Mandatory Palestine, including Haganah, Lehi and Irgun. They were built all over the country in order to provide easy access to weapons, which were used to protect settlements and carry out offensive operations. The term slick referred mostly to Jewish armed forces hiding places but was used too by Arabs.

The variety of sliks was extensive: personal sliks in residential areas, "top" or "surface" sliks for quick access versus long-term "deep" sliks as warehouse, sliks in containers buried in the ground or under floors (in milk jugs, barrels, or sealed pipes), and constructed sliks.
