= Diascope =

A diascope is a device used for showing images of transparent objects. It may refer to:

- Slide projector, a projector for showing enlarged images of small photographic slides
- Overhead projector, a projector that projects an image of a transparent object over the heads of the viewers onto a screen in front of them.
- Slide viewer, a device for looking at film transparencies or similar photographic images
