= Sawyer's =

American manufacturer of slide projectors

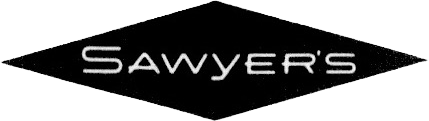
- Company type: Private
- Founded: 1914
- Fate: Acquired by General Aniline & Film (GAF), 1966
- Headquarters: Portland, Oregon, United States
- Area served: Worldwide
- Products: View-Master; Slide projectors; Stereo cameras; Scenic postcards
- Revenue: $26 million (Fiscal year 1966)
- Subsidiaries: Sawyer's Europe, S.A.

Sawyer's, Inc. was an American manufacturer and retailer of slide projectors, scenic slides, View-Master reels and viewers, postcards, and related products, based in Portland, Oregon. Founded in 1914 as a photo-finishing company, Sawyer's began producing and selling View-Masters in 1939, and that soon became its primary product. It later diversified into other photographic products, mostly related to film transparencies, and established manufacturing plants in Europe, Japan and India. By the early 1960s, Sawyer's was the nation's second-largest manufacturer of slide projectors, and by 1965 slide projectors had surpassed View-Master reels and equipment as a percentage of the company's annual sales. In 1951, the company moved from Portland proper to the unincorporated Progress area in Portland's southwestern suburbs. In 1966, Sawyer's was acquired by New York-based General Aniline & Film (GAF), and its product lines and facilities were taken over by GAF. It was a subsidiary company of GAF until 1968, when it became simply a division of that company, renamed the GAF Consumer Photo Division. For several years thereafter, GAF used "Sawyer's" as a brand name for its slide projectors.

== Early years ==
Sawyer's was founded in Portland, Oregon, in 1914 by Carleton Sawyer and A. R. Specht as a photo-finishing service. Specht was a Portland executive in the San Francisco-based Owl Drug Company chain. Owl Drug's Portland store was the chain's third-busiest, and Specht hoped to capitalize on the public's growing use of cameras by making Owl Drug a convenient source of photo-finishing services for Portlanders. In mid-1919, Edwin E. Mayer, a camera enthusiast who had just graduated from the North Pacific College of Pharmacy (in Portland), bought out Carleton Sawyer's stake in the company bearing his name. Later the same year, Mayer and three relatives acquired the remaining stake from A. R. Specht. According to a 1946 article in The Oregonian, "For 20 years Mayer retained membership in the pharmaceutical ranks, but never practiced his profession," working instead on building up the photofinishing business of Sawyer's. In 1924, the company was occupying a 60-by-100-foot (18 m × 30 m), two-story building on SW 20th Avenue, next to Multnomah Field in central Portland. By that time, the company had begun producing photographic postcards and souvenir photo sets. As business grew, the company purchased an adjacent 70-by-90-foot (21 m × 27 m) two-story building on SW Ella Street (now 20th Place) for expansion.

In 1926, Harold J. Graves joined the company. He had served a long stint as a U.S. Army photographer and then operated photo shops in Salem and Eugene, Oregon, before buying a stake in Sawyer's. Graves handled marketing for the company's products while Mayer ran the business. Later, photographic greeting cards marketed to major department stores were added to the Sawyer's product line. Sawyer's was the nation's largest producer of scenic postcards in the 1920s. Mayer remained the company's general manager for more than three decades, until his death in 1956 from a heart attack.

== View-Master introduction ==
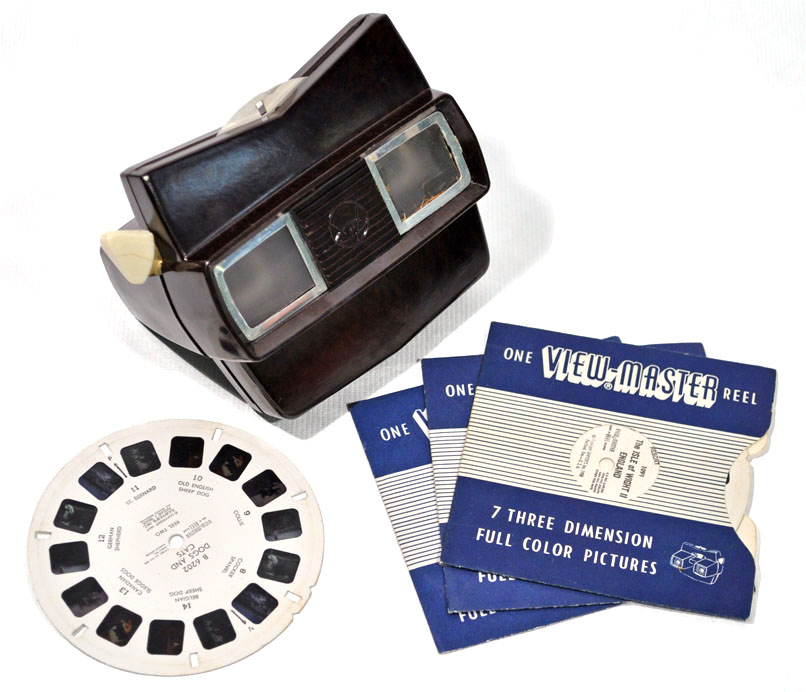
A View-Master viewer and picture reel

The company took the first steps towards developing the View-Master stereoscope after a chance meeting, at the Oregon Caves in 1938, between Graves and William Gruber, an organ maker of German origin trained by Welte & Sons and an avid photographer, living in Portland. The View-Master used disk-shaped "reels" which are thin cardboard disks containing seven stereoscopic 3-D pairs of small color photographs on film, and its individual eyepieces immersed the viewer into the scene more fully than previous stereoscopes. Mayer and Gruber had both developed devices for viewing stereo images, but Gruber had developed the idea of mounting tiny pieces of Kodachrome color transparency film into reels made from heavy paper stock, for viewing in a stereo slide viewer designed for the reels. Gruber partnered with the owners of Sawyer's to develop the invention.

In late 1939, the View-Master was introduced at the New York World's Fair (marked "Patent Applied For"). It was intended as an alternative to the scenic postcard, and was originally sold at photography shops, stationery stores, and scenic-attraction gift shops. The main subjects of the first View-Master reels were Carlsbad Caverns and the Grand Canyon. The View-Master was marketed through the photo-finishing, postcard, and greeting-card company, Sawyer's, Inc. The partnership led to the retail sales of View-Master viewers and disks. The patent on the viewing device was issued in 1940, on what came to be called the Model A viewer. Within a very short time, the View-Master took over the postcard business as Sawyer's biggest and most profitable product area. The company continued to make other photographic products, however, including about 30 million postcards per year and about 1.5 million photographic greeting cards per year.

By 1942, Sawyer's was selling its products through almost 1,000 retail outlets nationwide. It was manufacturing about 250,000 View-Master viewers per year by the mid-1940s. In 1945–46, the company added two newly constructed two-story buildings to its complex on and near SW 20th Avenue. As of spring 1946, the company was employing about 100 people, but a factory expansion under way at that time was due to increase that figure by about 75 when completed.

== Factory relocation and expansion ==
In 1951, the company moved its headquarters and production facilities from its longtime Portland location near Multnomah Stadium to a new complex built on a 14.5-acre (5.9 ha) site in the then-unincorporated area known as Progress, between Beaverton and Tigard and in the southwestern suburbs of the Portland metropolitan area. The site was located along a Spokane, Portland & Seattle Railway line and adjacent to Oregon Highway 217. Stereocraft Engineering, a Portland firm that had been producing specialized machinery for Sawyer's since 1946, built its own new plant adjoining the new Sawyer's plant in Progress.

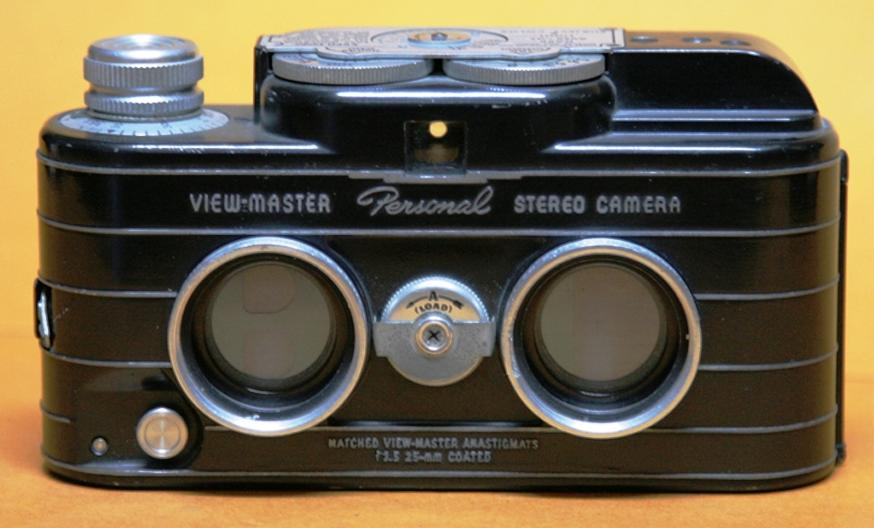
The View-Master Personal Stereo Camera was introduced in 1952.

Also in 1951, Sawyer's purchased Tru-Vue, a producer of stereoscopic film strips that had been the main competitor of the View-Master product line. In addition to eliminating its main rival, the takeover also gave Sawyer's Tru-Vue's licensing rights to Walt Disney Studios. Sawyer's capitalized on the opportunity and produced numerous reels featuring Disney characters. The takeover would pay off further in 1955, with reels of the newly opened Disneyland. The Tru-Vue Company was a subsidiary of Sawyer's, Inc. Through the 1950s Sawyer's successively introduced new models of its View-Master viewer.

Sawyer's introduced the View-Master Personal Stereo Camera in 1952. The camera allowed amateurs to create their own View-Master reels. Most fabrication work on the new camera was carried out by Stereocraft Engineering, the established Sawyer's contractor that had followed Sawyer's in its move to a larger work site in the suburbs. Within two years, the Personal camera had spawned the introduction of a 3-D projector, the Stereomatic 500.

A conventional still camera named the Nomad was introduced by Sawyer's in 1956, with models for two different film formats: 127 and 620.

== Diversification and overseas expansion ==
Sawyer's established a European subsidiary named Sawyer's Europe in 1952, in a newly built facility in Sint-Niklaas, Belgium, and expanded the factory in 1964. It established three other foreign subsidiaries in 1958, in Sydney, Australia (Sawyer's Inc. Australia Pty. Ltd.); Tokyo, Japan; and France. The French company was a subsidiary of Sawyer's Europe and was named View-Master S.A.

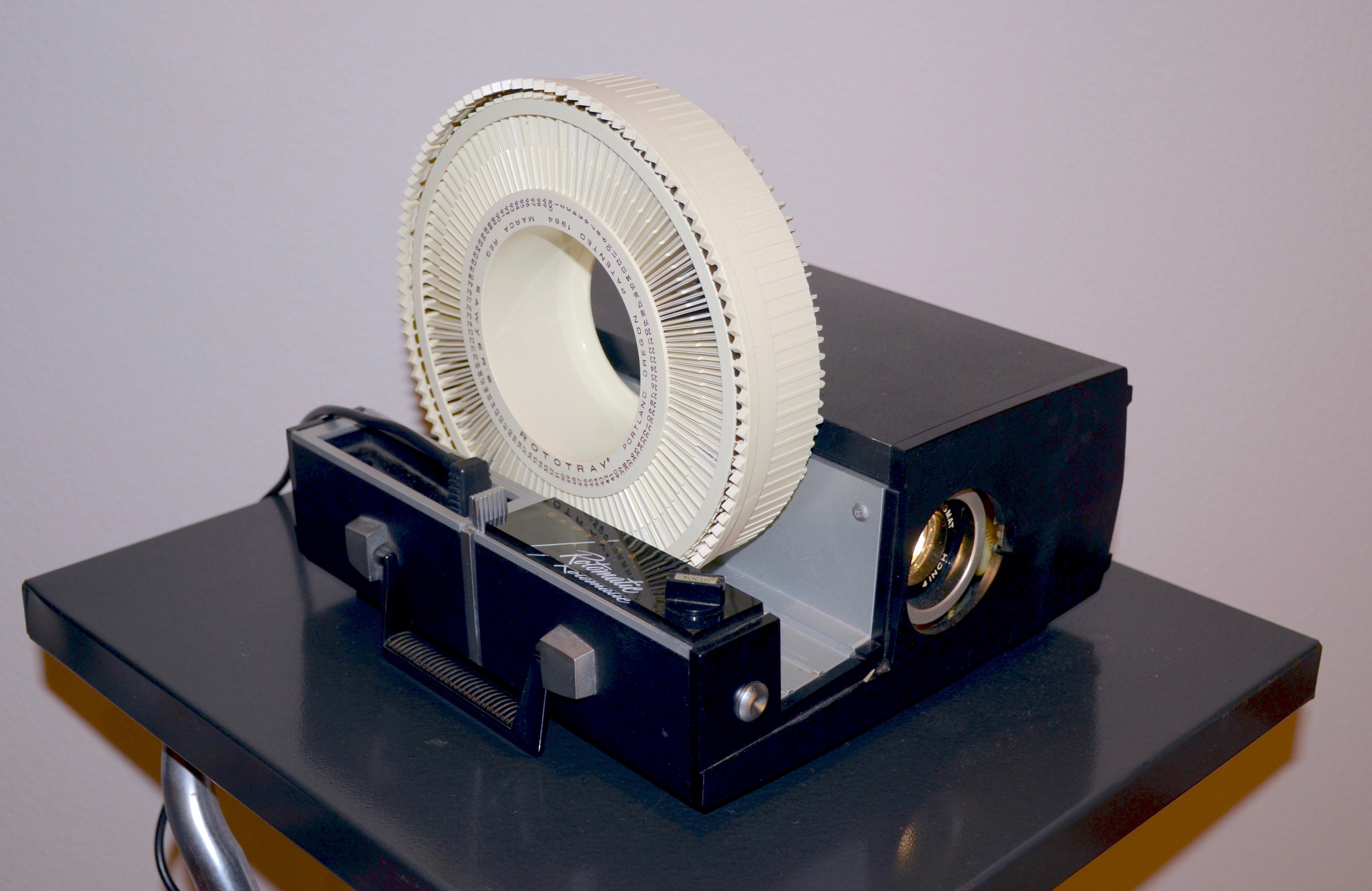
A Sawyer's Rotomatic slide projector

During the late 1950s the company began manufacturing slide projectors (for conventional 2x2-inch slides), viewers for conventional slides and scenic slide sets. By 1961, slide projectors had become Sawyers' second-most-profitable product. A new model introduced in 1963 was known as the Sawyer's Rotomatic and used upright circular trays, called Rototrays, to hold the slides (100 per tray).

Sales totaled $8.6 million in 1961 and $9.1 million in 1962. New products introduced in 1962 included a dictation machine. The company's workforce numbered about 300 in January 1960, but within two years it had more than doubled, to 687 at the beginning of February 1962. Sawyer's was the second-largest U.S. manufacturer of slide projectors in the early and mid-1960s, second only to Eastman Kodak, which had introduced the Carousel slide projector in the early 1960s and patented it in 1965. A 1965 Oregonian article stated that Sawyer's was "one of the two largest U.S. manufacturers of slide projectors and related items, running neck and neck with Kodak, according to industry sources." A portable projection table was introduced in 1964. The company's main plant, in Progress, was employing 800 people. The number of dealers selling View-Master products had grown to about 9,000.

Sawyer's made its first public offering of stock in 1962, and a second offering was made three years later. In 1965, the View-Master product line represented 37 percent of the company's sales, whereas slide projectors and accessories accounted for 43 percent. Sales of slides, slide viewers, Tru-Vue stereoscopic viewers and various other products made up the remainder of sales. Total sales for the fiscal year ending in April 1965 was reported to be $19.3 million, and amounted to $26 million (equivalent to $258 million in 2025) in the following fiscal year.

A movie projector for use with the then-new Super 8 film was introduced as a new Sawyer's product around early 1965.

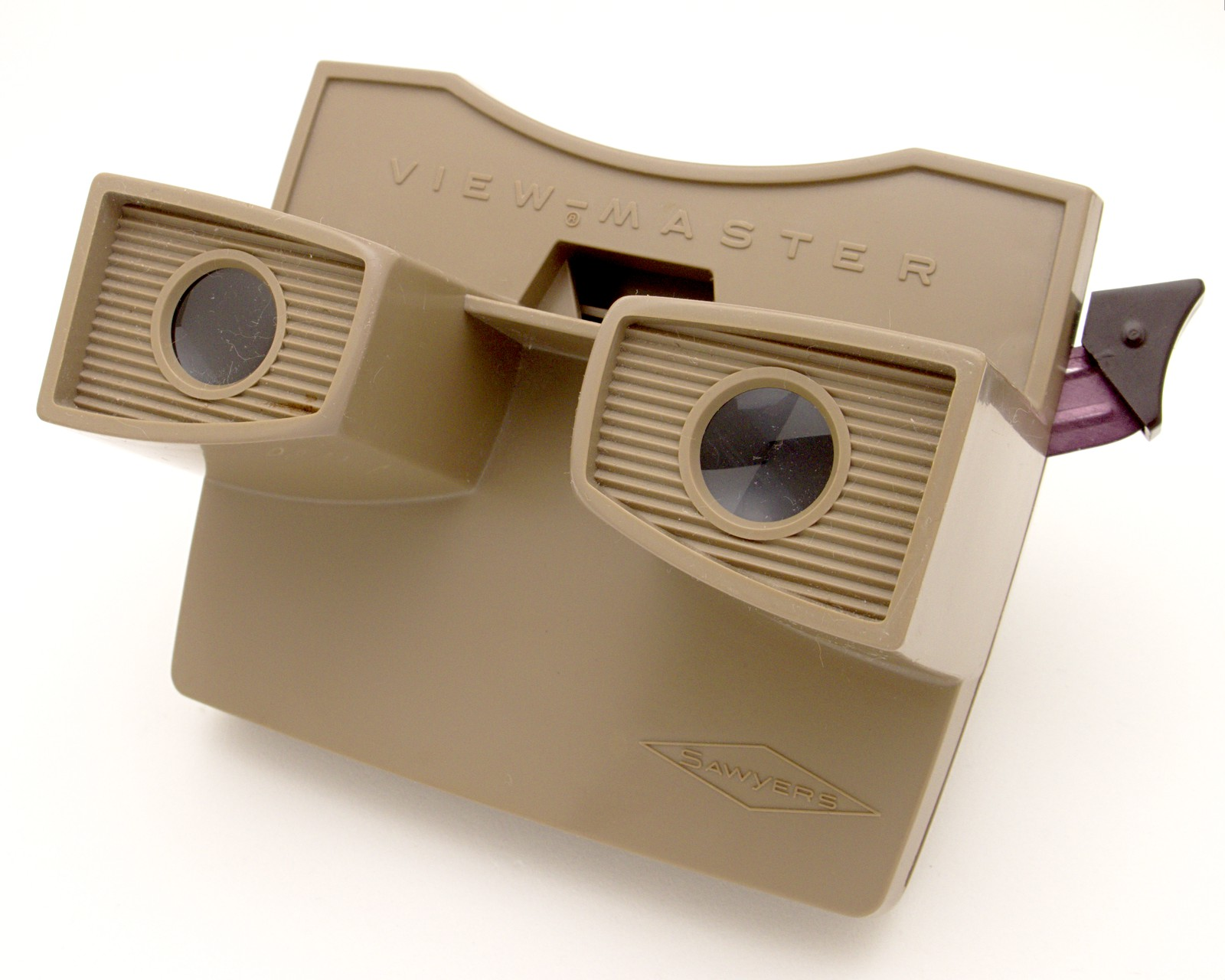
A 1962 View-Master viewer, with the Sawyer's logo on the front

In 1965, the company was manufacturing 2,000 projectors a day, and daily production of View-Master reels had grown from a recent norm of 50,000 to as many as 160,000 on peak days. In addition to its own name, Sawyer's sold its products under the brand names View-Master, Tru-Vue and Pana-Vue, with sales throughout the U.S. and in more than 100 foreign countries. Some of its foreign sales and manufacturing were made through subsidiary companies. Largest of these was Sawyer's Europe, S.A., which was 57.5% owned by the parent company in the U.S. and had a workforce of about 200. It recorded sales of $2.7 million in fiscal year 1965, while a wholly owned Japanese subsidiary and a 49-percent-owned Indian affiliate collectively recorded a comparatively small total of $100,000 in sales for the same period. Sales in Canada represented 5 percent of the company's gross sales.

== Acquisition by GAF ==
In June 1966, the owners of Sawyer's Inc. revealed that they were considering selling the company to General Aniline & Film Corp. (GAF), of New York and formerly German-owned, and that the two companies had been negotiating on and off since July 1965. A deal was finalized in October 1966, and Sawyer's Inc. was sold to GAF on October 31, 1966. The manufacturing facilities and workforce in the Progress area, in the southwestern suburbs of the Portland metropolitan area, were retained by GAF. Sawyers, Inc. became a wholly owned GAF subsidiary registered in Delaware, rather than Oregon, but initially continued to be managed by Robert Brost, president of Sawyer's since 1959, who was to remain in Portland. However, eventually operations were folded into GAF, with the former subsidiary being renamed as GAF's Consumer Photo Division in 1968. General Aniline and Film Corp., as opposed to "GAF", had remained that company's formal name until April 1968, when it was changed to GAF Corporation. For several years after that change, GAF used "Sawyer's" as a brand name for some of its slide projectors.

GAF's Progress factory continued to do well and even expand in the years following the transfer of ownership, but after a peak employment of 1,700 at the site in 1973 the workforce size declined to around 1,200 by 1976. It had fallen to about 1,000 by mid-1977, when layoffs of 400 were announced, which would reduce it to 600. A decline in the demand for projectors was cited as a key factor. At that time, The Oregonian newspaper reported that the ex-Sawyer's plant in Progress was "the only domestic operation that produces movie and slide projectors". In announcing the layoffs in July 1977, GAF said it would be selling its projector-manufacturing operations and would also be discontinuing the manufacture and sales of consumer films, cameras and color paper.
