= Tru-Vue =

American stereoscope company

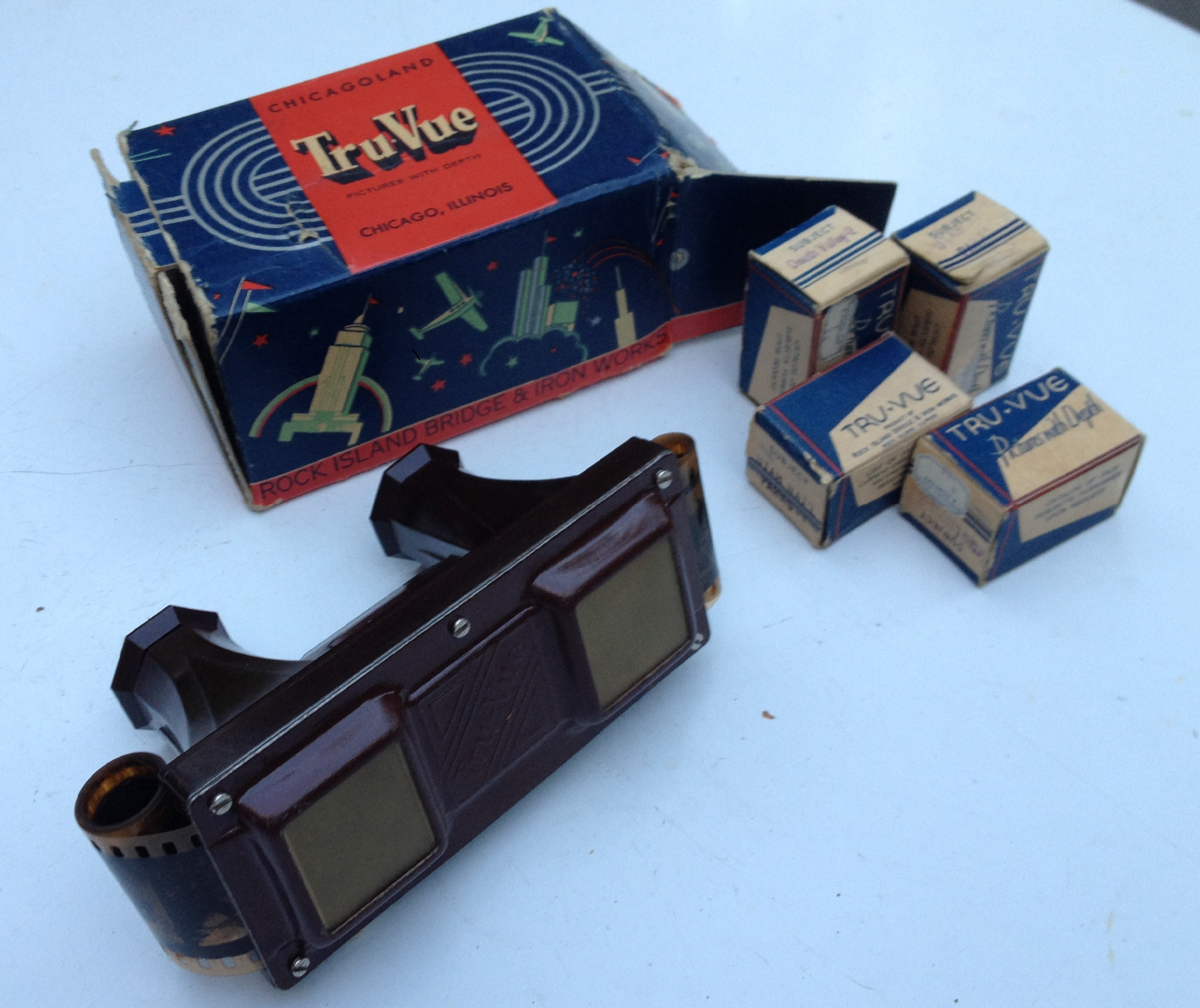
Tru-Vue Chicagoland model 3D viewer with package and black&white films

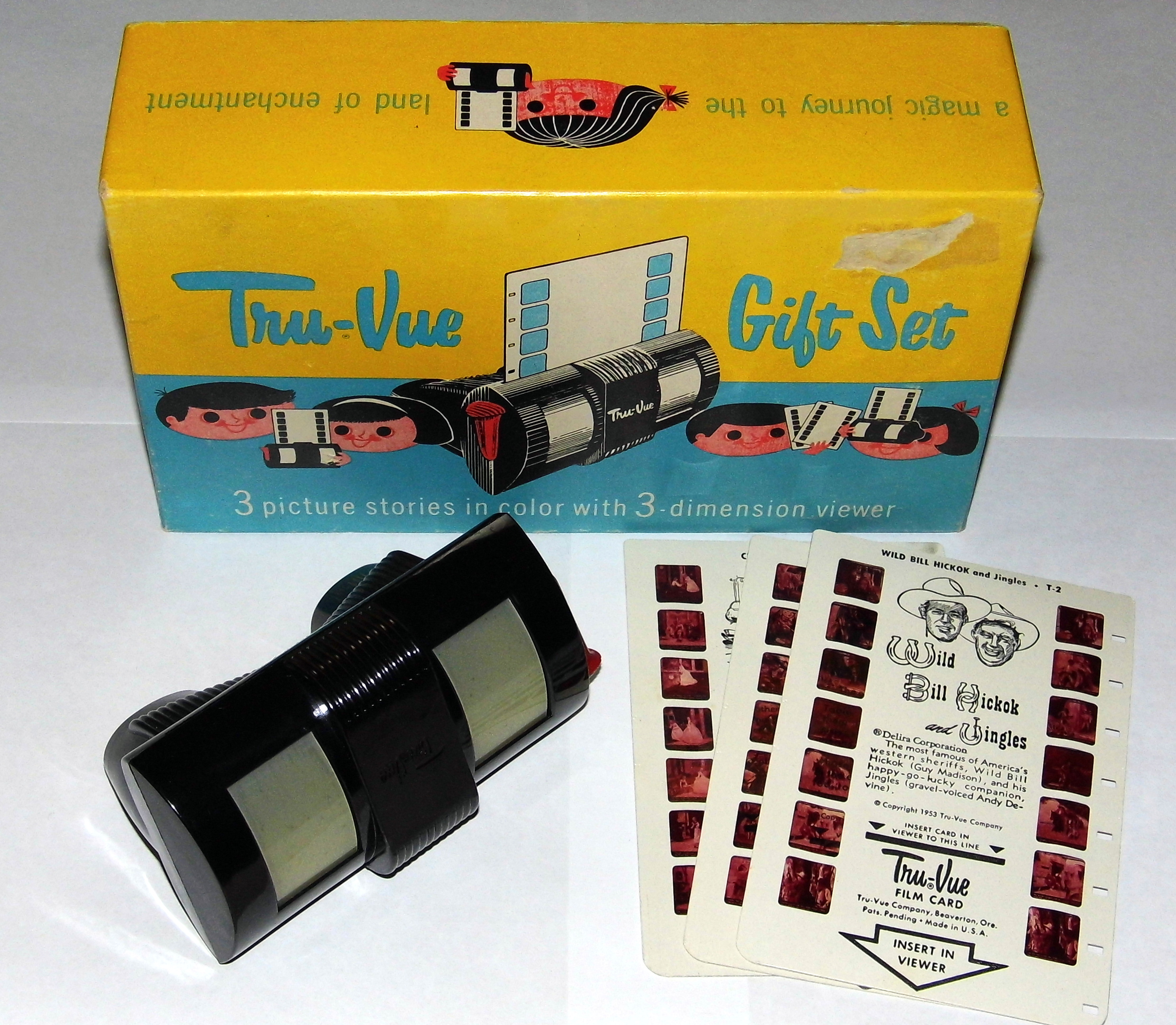
A Tru-Vue viewer and film cards from 1953, by which time the company had relocated to Oregon and become a subsidiary of Sawyer's.

Tru-Vue, a subsidiary of Rock Island Bridge and Iron Works, was a manufacturer of stereoscopic filmstrips and corresponding stereoscope viewers, based in Rock Island, Illinois, from 1932 to 1951 and in Beaverton, Oregon, from 1951 until the late 1960s.

The company is historically significant as a bridge between the stereoscopic cards of the 19th century and the View-Master reels of the mid-20th.

== Description ==
The film strips, or film cards, are fed through a slide viewer similar to a View-Master, which is art deco or streamlined in style. The viewers are made of bakelite and available in multiple colors. When held up to light the images appear in 3D. The films were based on attractive scenery, children's stories, travel, night life, and current events.

== Purchase by Sawyer's ==
The company was purchased in 1951 by Sawyer's—the manufacturer of the View-Master—because Tru-Vue had an exclusive contract to make children's filmstrips based on Disney characters. Tru-Vue moved at that time from Rock Island, Illinois, to Beaverton, Oregon, near where Sawyer's had built a new plant, and for a few years was a subsidiary company of Sawyer's. Eventually, it became only a brand name. Both View-Master and Tru-Vue products were manufactured into the 1960s by Sawyer's.

== Competitors ==
Competitors of Tru-Vue included the American company Novelview from the 1930s and the British manufacturer Sightseer from the 1950s. Forgeries of Tru-Vue are also known, including the British True-View from the 1950s that copied the style of viewers, filmstrips, and film boxes, and a True-View viewer made in Hong Kong during the 1950s that copied the shape of a Tru-Vue viewer but accepted opaque cards instead of films.
