= View-Master Personal Stereo Camera =

3D Camera

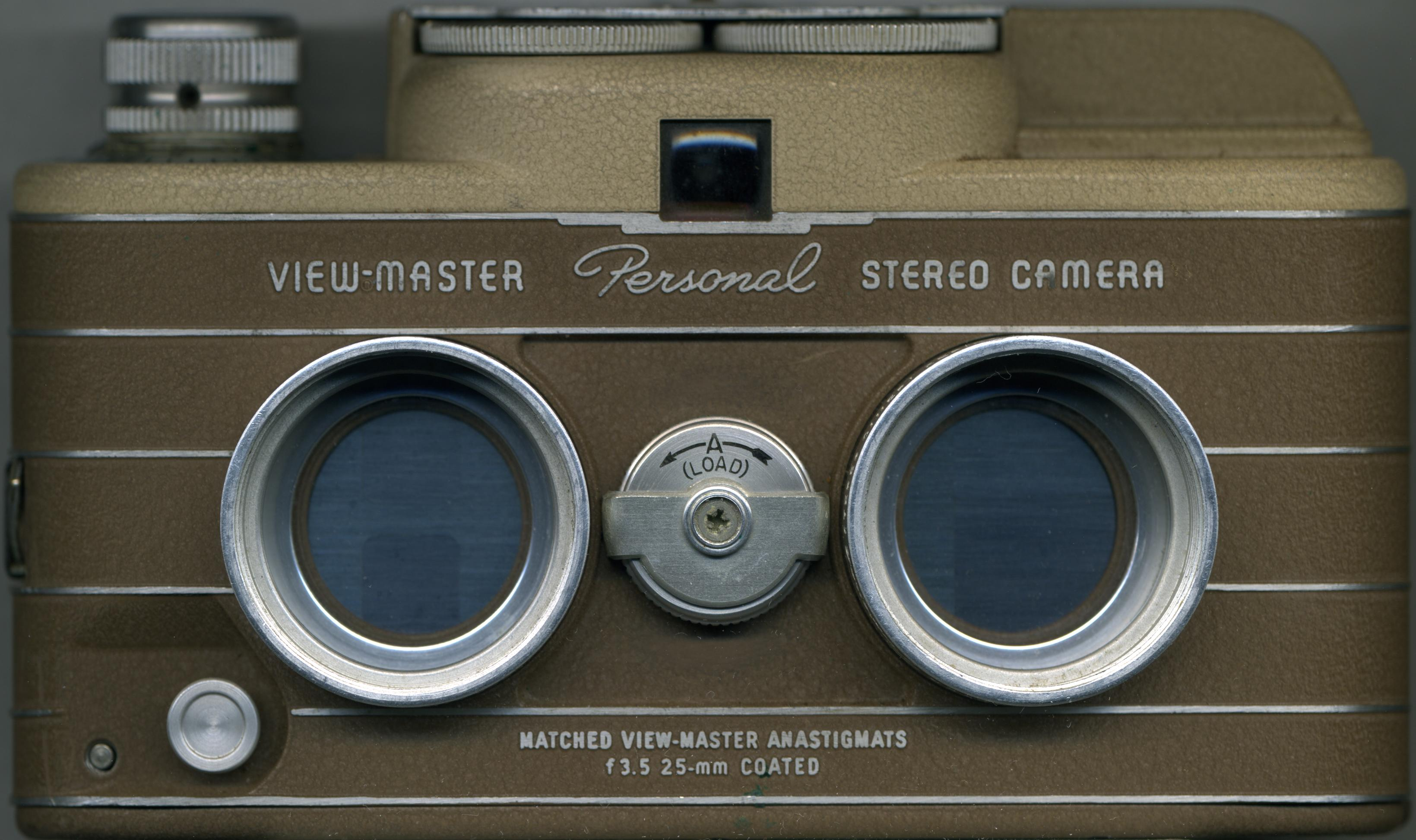
- A View-Master Personal Stereo Camera

Overview
- Maker: Sawyer's, Inc.
- Type: Stereo

Lens
- Lens: Fixed lens
- F-numbers: 3.5, 4, 4.5, 5.6, 6.3, 8, 11, and 16

Sensor/medium
- Sensor type: Film
- Sensor size: 35mm

Focusing
- Focus: Fixed

Flash
- Flash: Nonstandard

Shutter
- Shutter speeds: 10–100 and Bulb (continuously adjustable)

The View-Master Personal Stereo Camera was a 35mm film camera designed to take 3D stereo photos for viewing in a View-Master. First released in 1952, the camera took 69 pairs of photos on a 36-exposure roll of 35mm film, taking one set while the film was unwound from the canister, and another set while it was rewound. Although focus was fixed, the camera supported both variable aperture settings and shutter speeds.

== Description ==
The View-Master Personal stereo camera was introduced by Sawyer's, Inc. in 1952 and was part of a complete system designed to allow amateurs to produce their own personal View-Master reels.

== Features ==
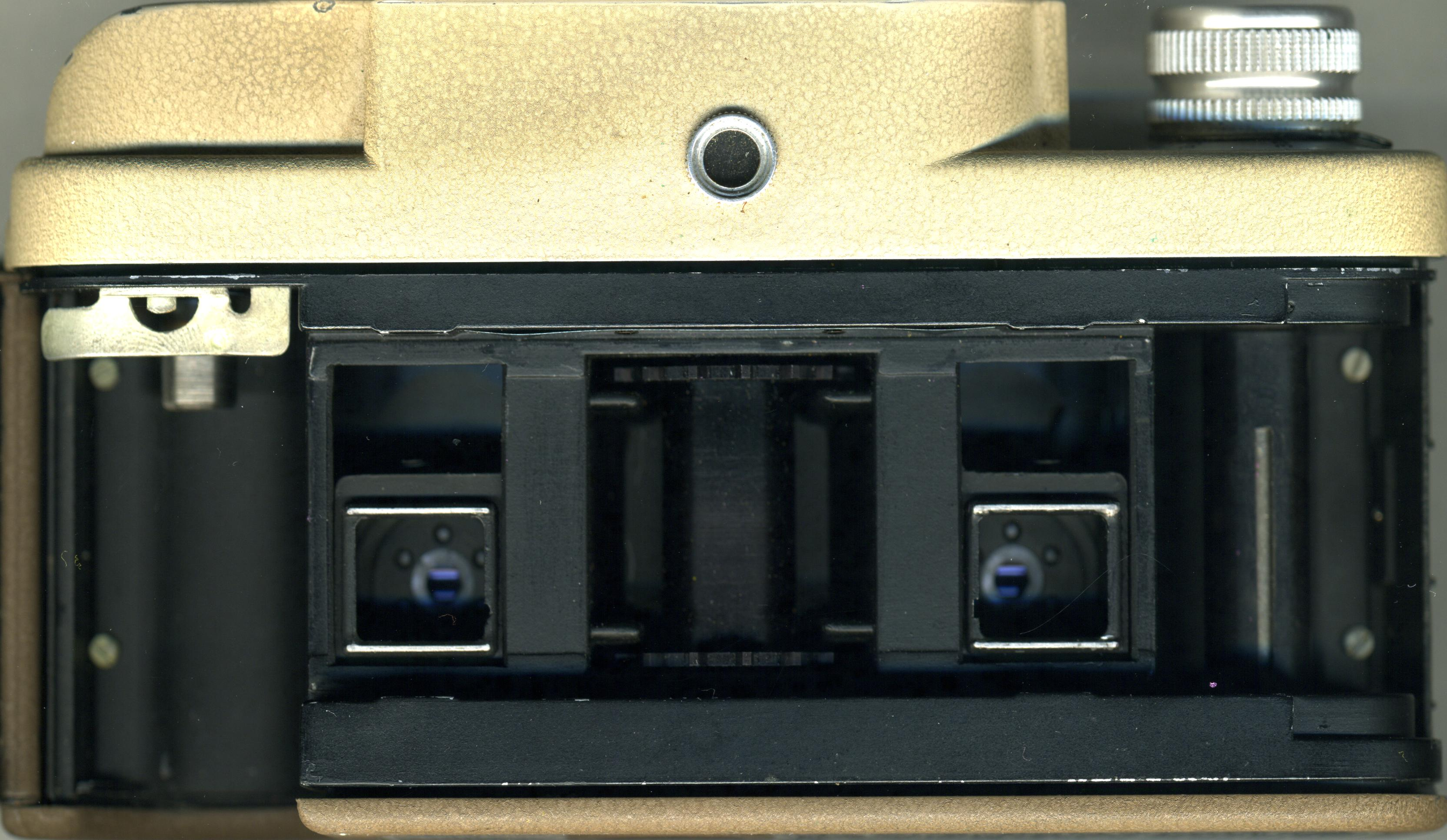
Selector on "A"

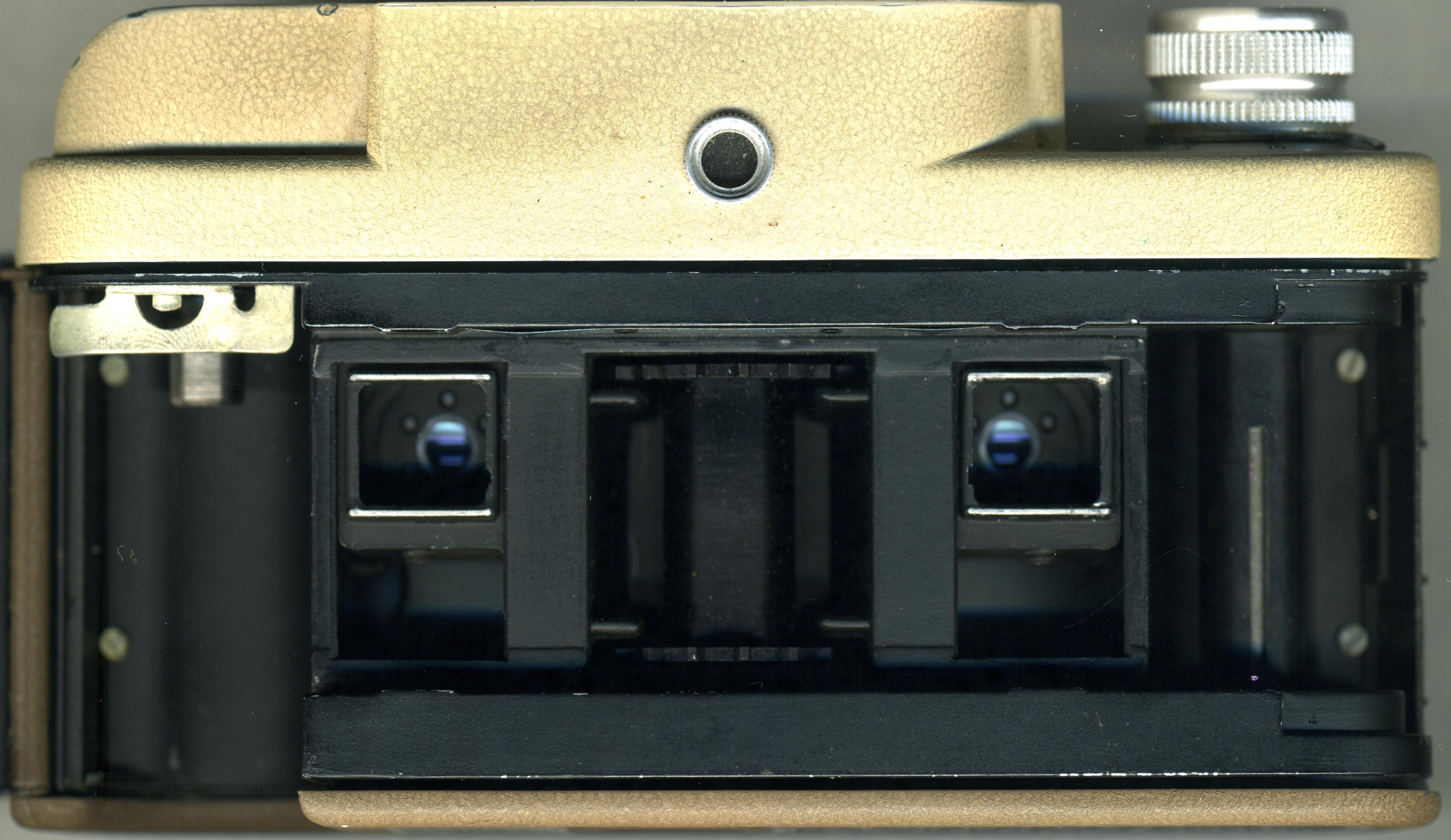
Selector on "B"

Two views of the film chamber with the selector in different positions

The View-Master Personal stereo camera uses 35mm film to produce 69 stereo pairs from a 36-exposure roll of film. This is accomplished by a "lens shift" mechanism which starts out in the "A" position to expose the bottom half of the film while the film is wound out of the canister and then in the "B" position the top half of the film is exposed while it is wound back into the canister.

The A/B selector, aside from shifting the images up and down also adjusts the film winding mechanism so that when the selector is on "A" the knob turns counter clockwise and the film counter counts down, and when it is on "B" the knob turns clockwise and the counter counts up.

The View-Master Personal advances by 8 sprockets with each picture and, as with Realist format cameras, there are two unrelated images between the right and left images of a pair, but there are also two smaller blank spaces. About half of the blank space is punched out with each film chip so that it can be handled by the blank area, to avoid scratching the image area.

The View-Master Personal is fixed focus with variable aperture and shutter speed.

The aperture selector is continuously adjustable and has marks for 3.5, 4, 4.5, 5.6, 6.3, 8, 11, and 16. The aperture selector has a hyperfocal table that shows the "range of sharpness from X to infinity for the aperture setting, about 7 feet for F/4, about 6 feet for F/5.6, a little closer than 5 feet for f/8 and a little closer than 4 feet for f/11.

The Shutter speed is continuously adjustable and has labeled marks at 10, 15, 25, 50, and 100 with several unlabeled marks between these numbers. It also has a Bulb (B) setting.

There is an exposure indicator which can be adjusted for different film speeds (ASA 5–100). This dial rotates as shutter speed and aperture are adjusted to indicate proper exposure in conditions of bright sun, hazy sun, cloudy bright, and cloudy dull for dark, average and light subjects.

The view finder is the direct view type with a bubble level visible in the frame, to ensure proper alignment.

The flash synchronization is through a nonstandard connector.

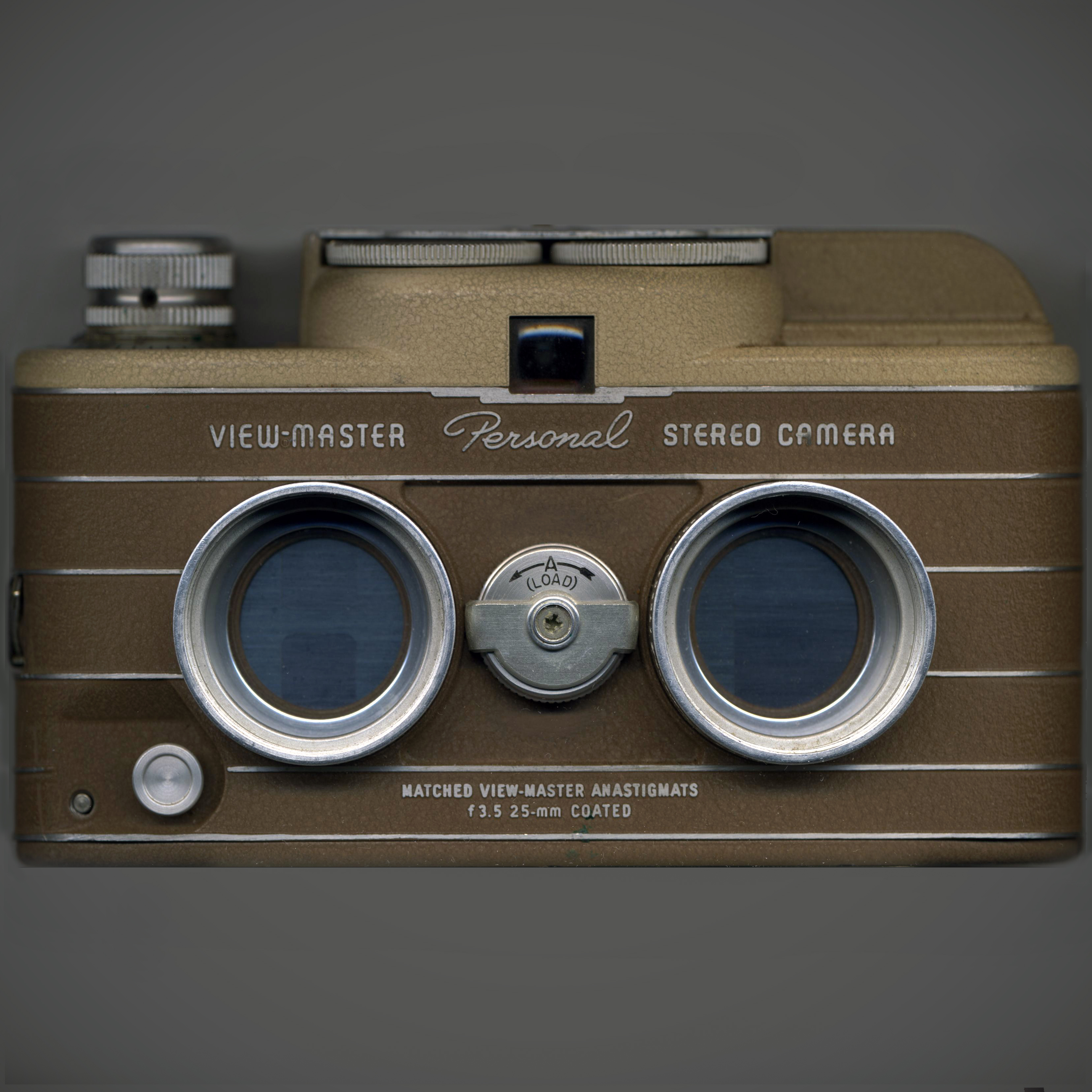
The View-Master Personal stereo camera. Note that the selector is in the "A" position.

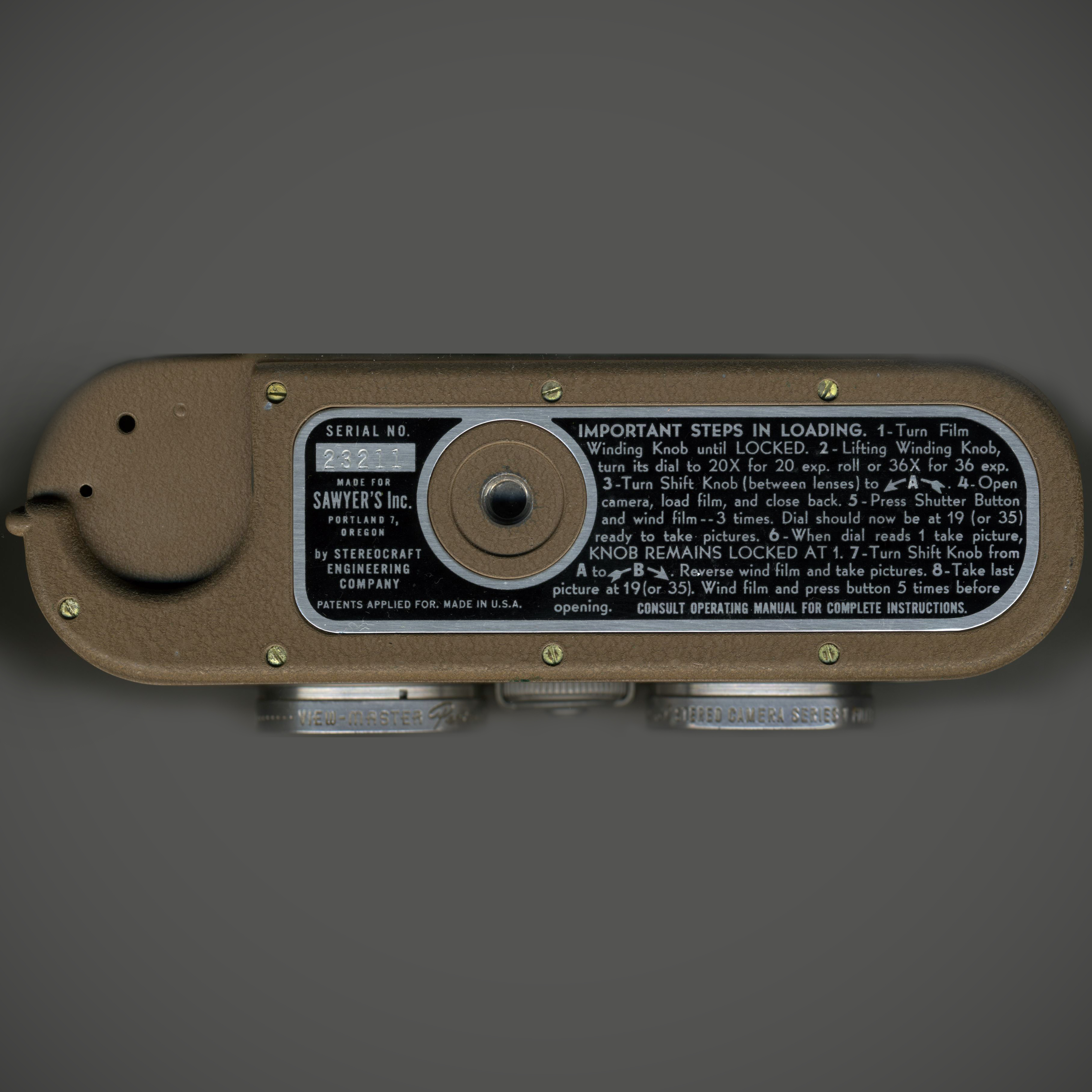
Bottom view of VM personal, note film loading, advancing instructions

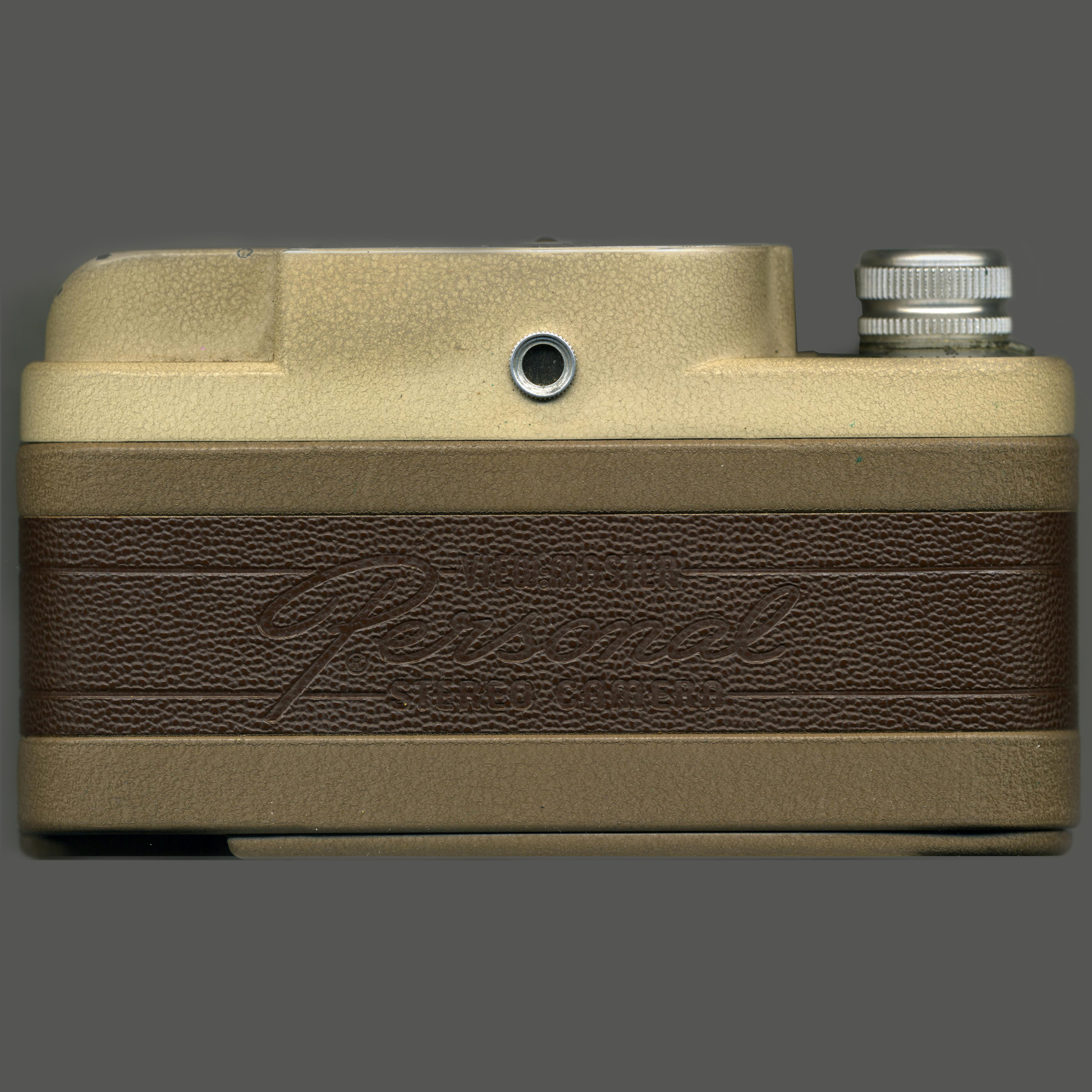
Back view of the View-Master Personal stereo camera.

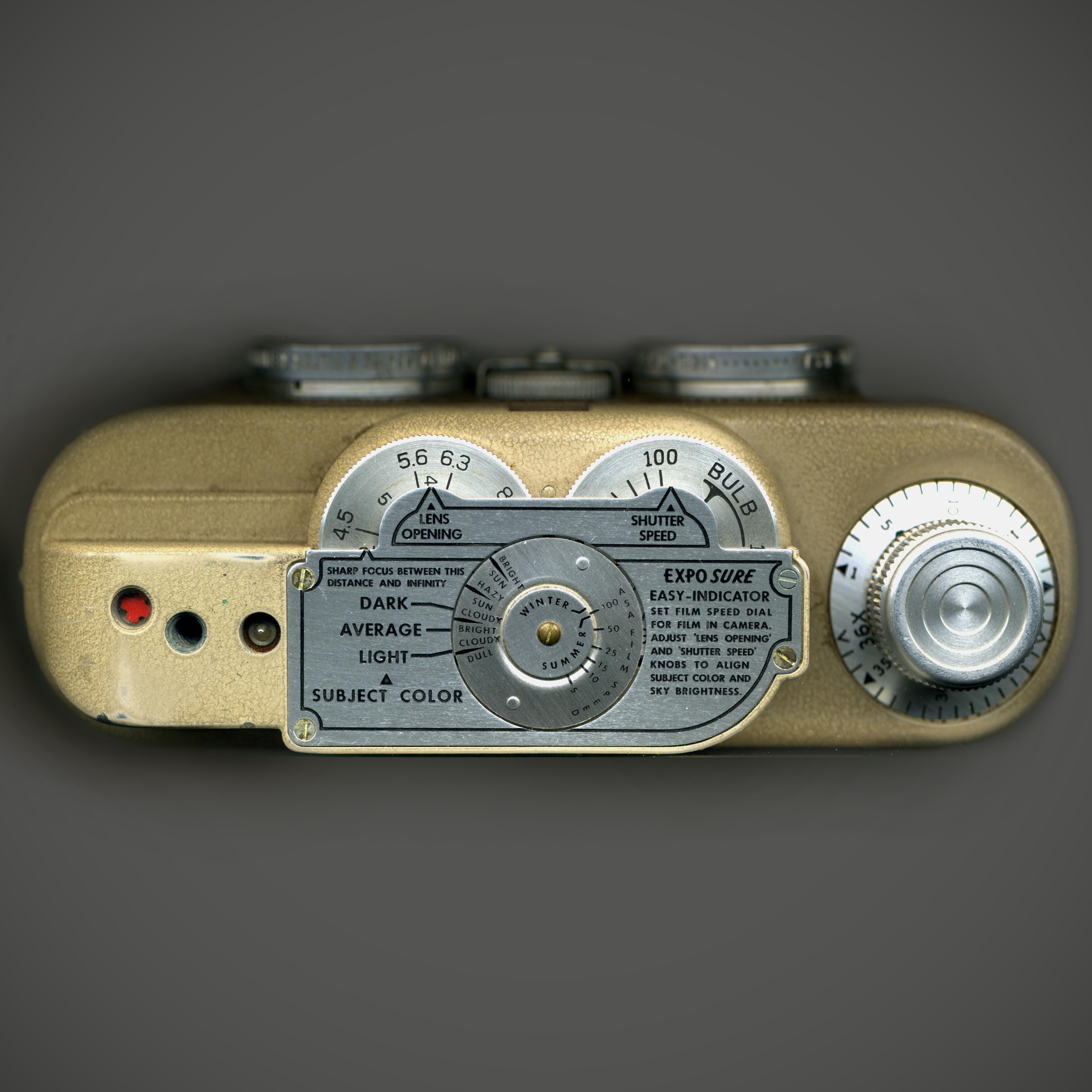
Top view of the View-Master Personal stereo camera.

== Accessories and support ==
Since standard slide film was used in the camera, users needed only to submit the film to any processor and request that it be returned uncut. Once the film was processed, there were several options for mounting the images in reels.

Sawyer's, Inc. offered a mounting service through mail order and similar services were offered by local dealers. Users could also mount their own images.

=== Cutter and mounts ===
Personal reel mounts were available with special pockets to insert the film chips. The pockets had marks on them corresponding to the notches on the right and left images. Because of the tight tolerances required by these slip in pockets and the way the images are arranged, it would be nearly impossible to properly cut the film with scissors or with conventional film cutters.

The View-Master Personal film cutter cut the chips to a tolerance of .001 inch, well within the requirements of the mounts.

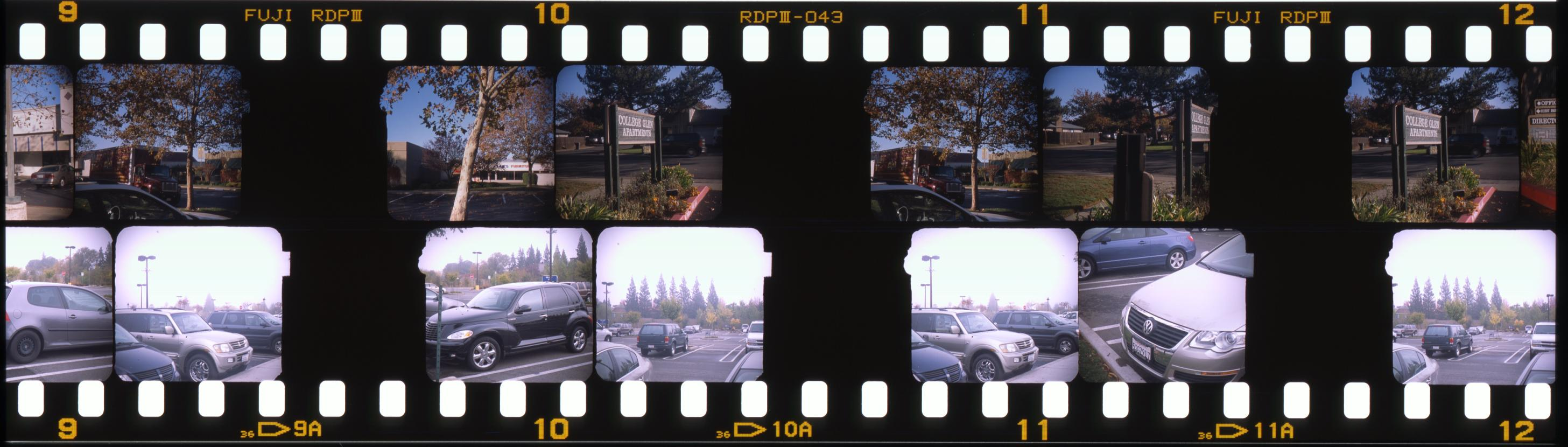
Image strip from the View-Master Personal stereo camera. Note that, as with most film stereo cameras, the right and left images are reversed. The right image has square notch on the right side and the left image has a kind of rounded, somewhat irregular notch on the left side. These notches are used to identify film chips when they are inserted into the pockets of the personal reel mounts.

=== Close up attachments ===
24 and 36 inch close up attachments with prismatic lenses adjusted both the focus and the stereo base for close up photography of small objects.

=== Stereomatic 500 projector ===
Stereo image
Left frame
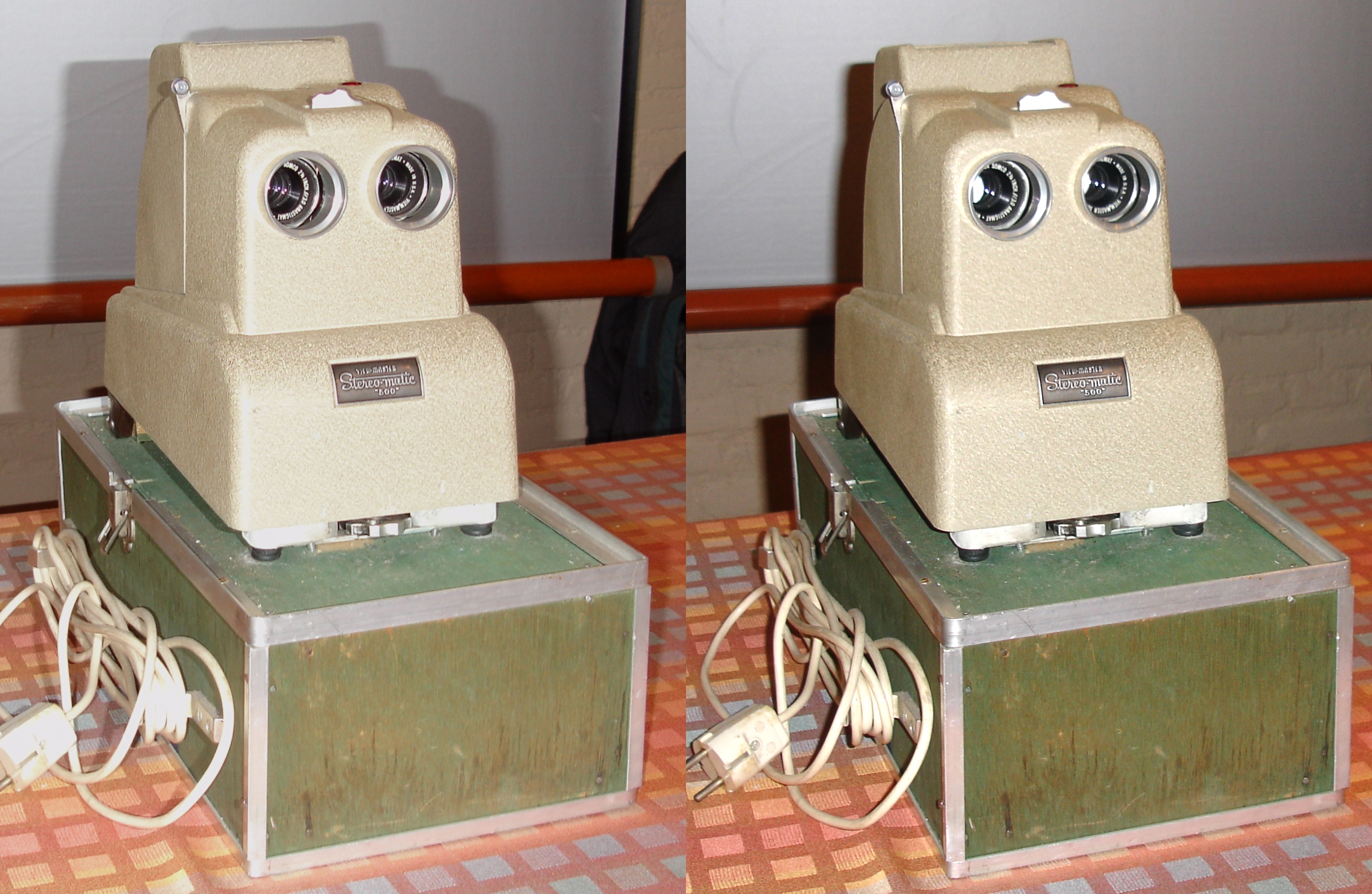
Right frame
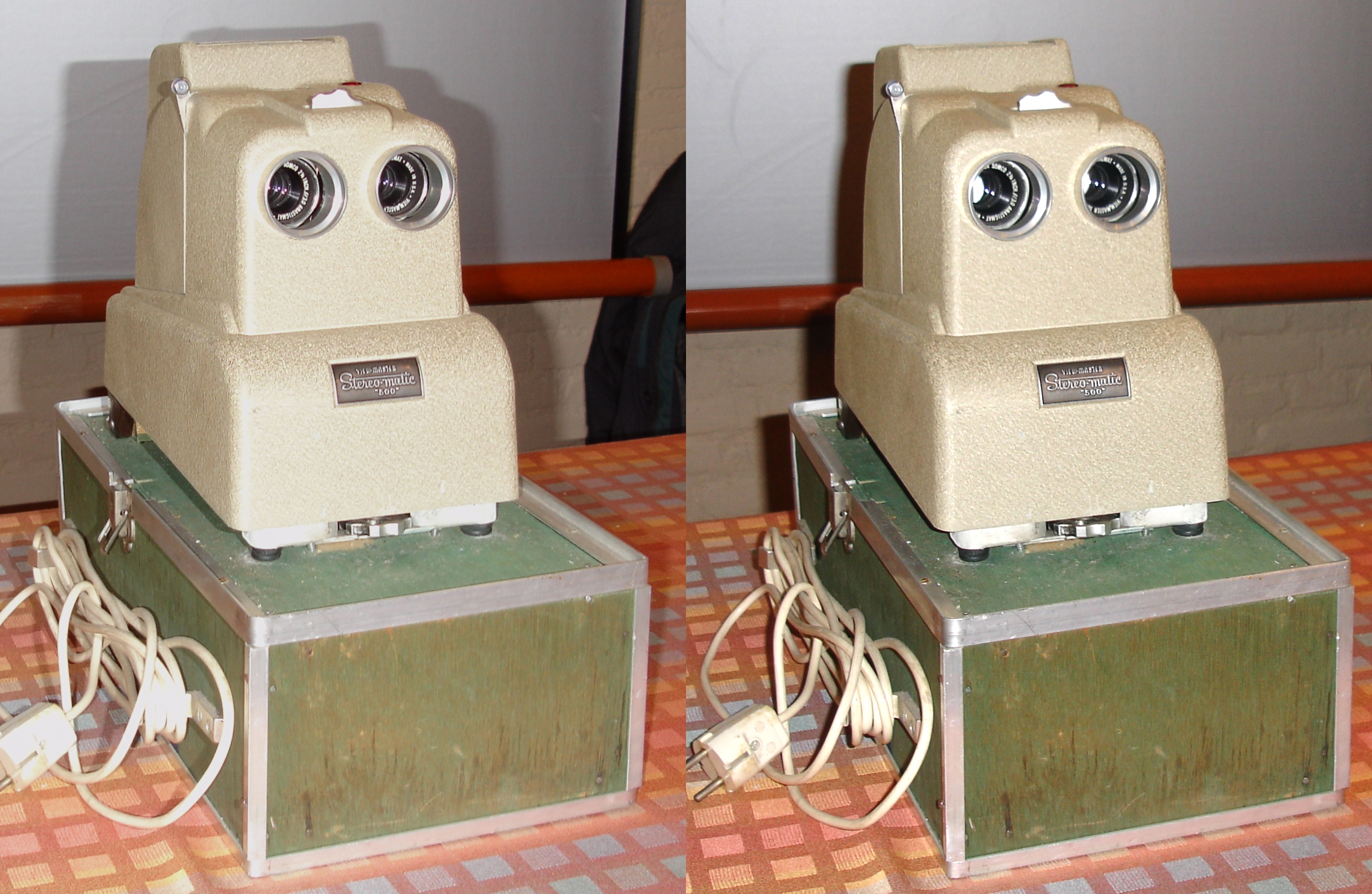
Parallel view
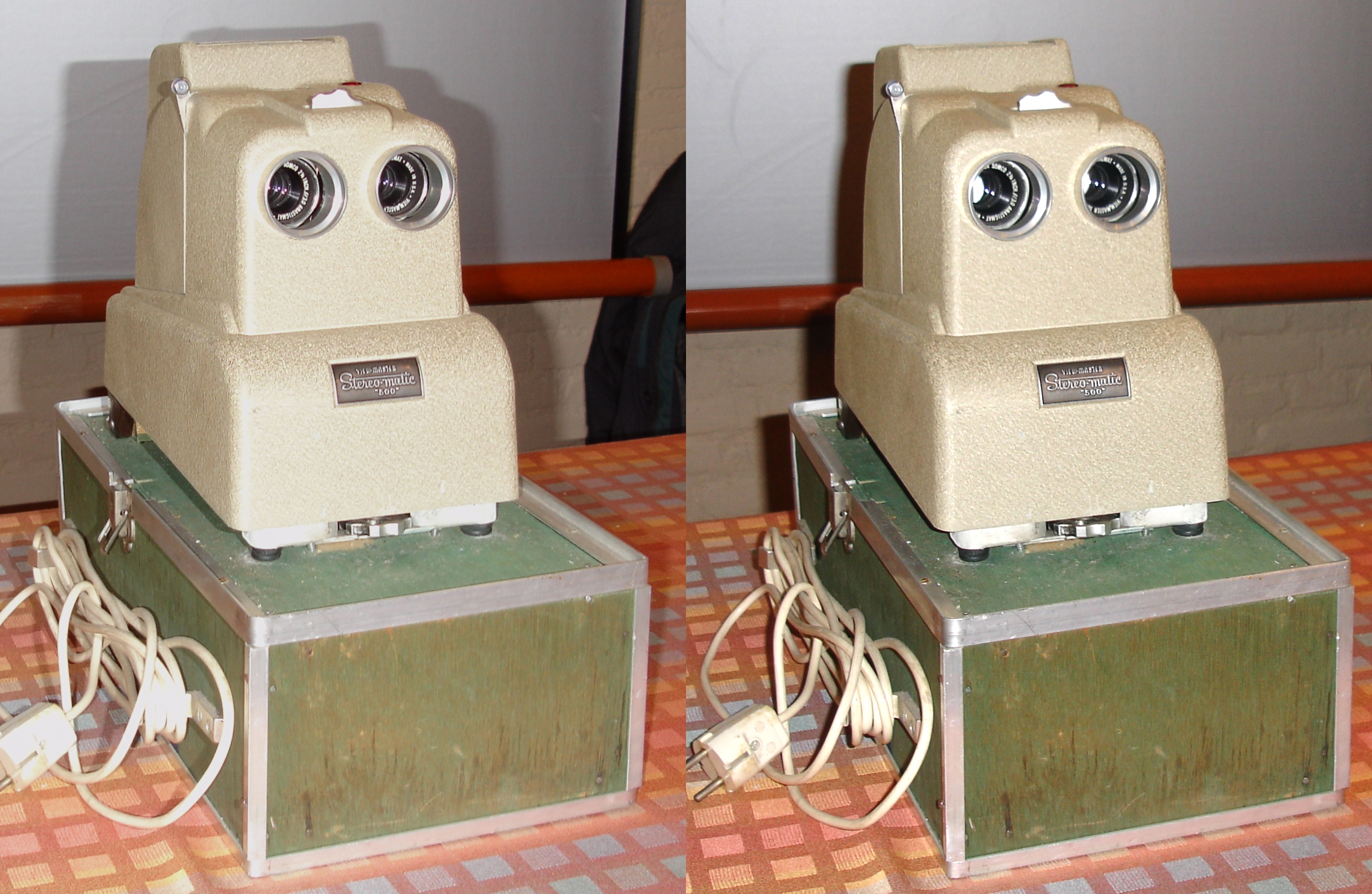
Cross-eye view
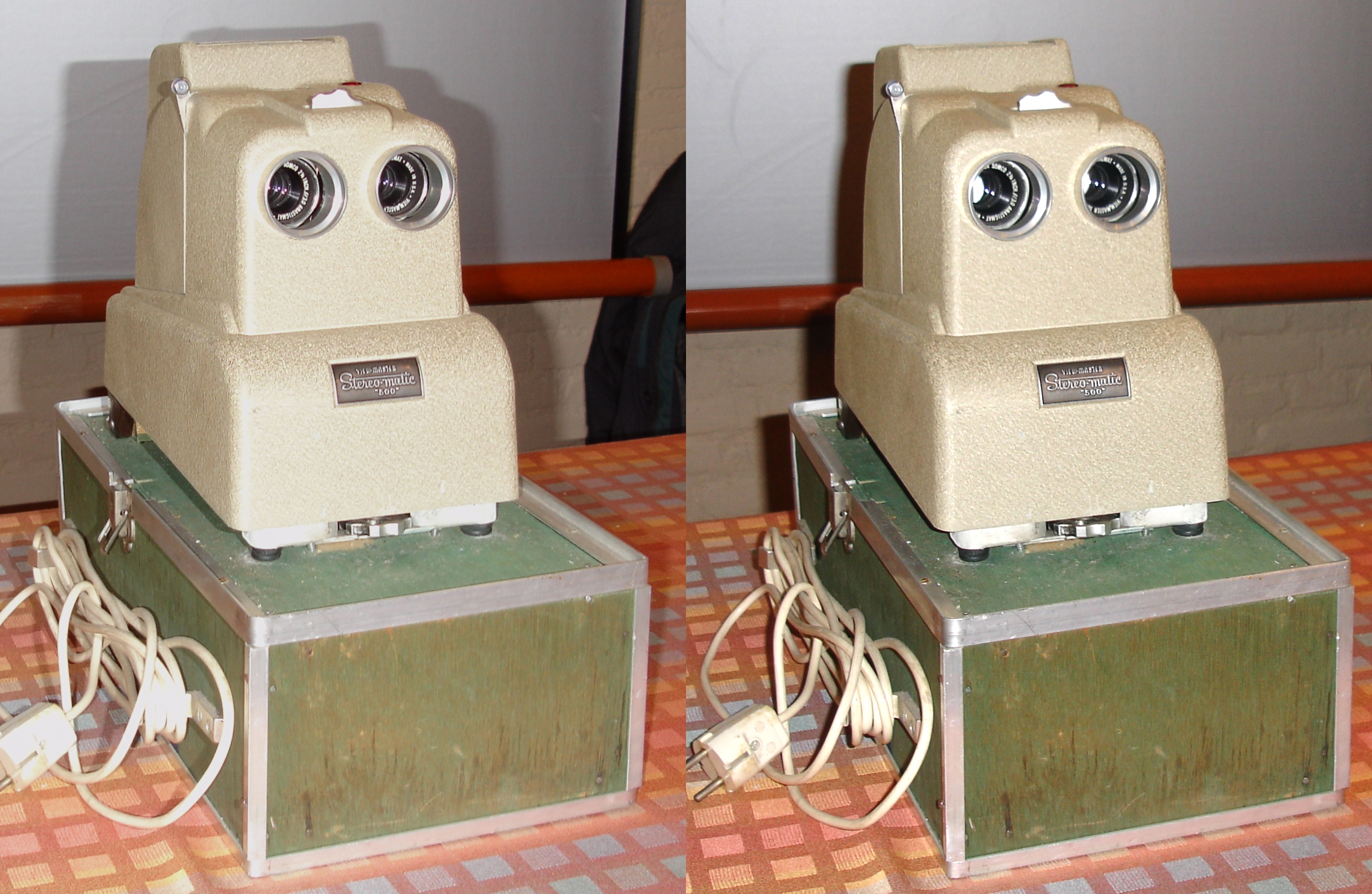

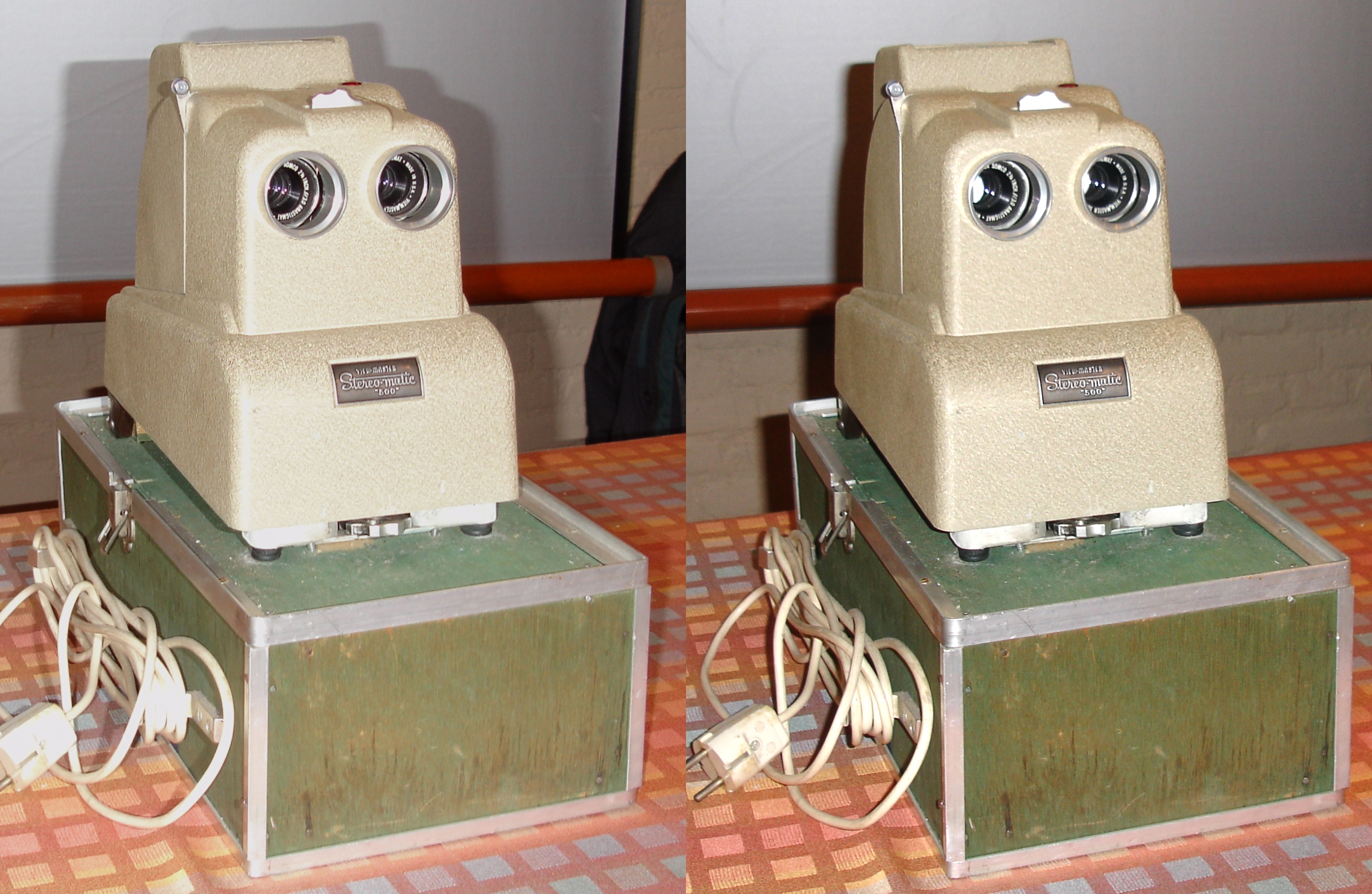
- Viewmaster Stereo projector

Personal reels could be viewed with the wide range of viewers designed for commercial reels but for group presentations Sawyer's offered the View-Master Stereomatic 500 projector. The Stereomatic 500 was much like other 50's stereo projectors except that it had a carriage and lens system designed for View-Master reels. It was used with polarized glasses and a silver screen for stereoscopic projection of reels.

Of course, the Stereomatic 500 could be used to project commercial reels as well, a fact not lost on avid collectors of such reels.

=== Other ===
Sawyer's also offered a leather case, the bottom of which could be left on except when loading and unloading film. Other accessories included custom filters and a flash attachment.

== History ==
The introduction of a camera that allowed amateurs to produce their own View-Master reels generated a lot of excitement among fans of the commercial reels, which at the time were dominated by scenic subjects. Though the camera was a bit pricey compared to most consumer level cameras of the time, the cost of film and processing was relatively inexpensive leading to the phrase, used on promotional reels, "Take pictures like this for less cost than snapshots."

However, the View-Master personal system could not compete with the image quality and broad support of the already well established Realist format and so it became a niche market within a niche market.

In 1955, Sawyer's ended production.

== View-Master Stereo Color aka View-Master Mark II ==
In 1962, Sawyer's Europe attempted to revive the idea of amateur View-Master photography with the View-Master Stereo Color aka View-Master Mark II. This camera had fixed focus and was designed to produce images for View-Master reels, but that is where the similarity ends.

Both the design and operation of the camera were simplified and it was also made more compact and versatile. Instead of the straight two pass image format of the View-Master Personal, the Mark II features a diagonal film path which exposes the film in one pass and yields 75 pairs on a 36-exposure roll instead of 69.

The different image arrangement made it incompatible with the View-Master Personal cutter, so a new cutter designed for the Mark II was produced.

Like the View-Master Personal, it lacked a hot shoe but did feature a cold shoe, as well as both "X" and "M" contacts, so it should work with most modern electronic flash units with the proper cord.

Instead of separate shutter speed and aperture settings, the Mark II features a single dial that sets exposure values:

Exposure Value	8	8½	9	10	11	12	13	14	15
f Stop	2.8	2.8	2.8	4	5.6	8	11	16	22
Shutter Speed	1/30	1/45	1/60	1/60	1/60	1/60	1/60	1/60	1/60
Sharp focus from _ feet to infinity	7	7	7	8	5	4	3	2	1½

Like the View-Master Personal, the Mark II features an exposure table adjustable for different film speeds.

Film advance is through a trigger shaped "rapid wind" button that advances the film when it is pushed down.

== After market ==
View-Master Personal and Mark II cameras are still actively traded through market places such as eBay and occasionally show up in estate sales. Most such cameras have been through several owners though barely used pristine examples do show up now and then.

Because of the ease of use of the VM cameras, many of the original owners were not technically inclined and had their pictures mounted professionally rather than doing it themselves. As a result, the number of VM cameras sold greatly exceeded the number of cutters sold. Though the Camera originally sold for $149 and the cutter for $19.50 (equivalent to $1,186 and $155 in 2008 dollars) the cutters typically sell today on eBay for at least $200 whereas the cameras often sell for $75, or even less.

This shortage of cutters is exacerbated by the fact that the Mark II cutter and the View-Master personal cutter are not interchangeable. Anyone who is looking for a camera and cutter for actual use would be advised to find a cutter first then buy the camera that matches it.

VM personal reel mounts are another story. In 1953, a six pack of blank reel mounts sold for $1 In the early 1990s, the price had risen to $4.50 per six pack, which is a little less than the $5.25 that the 1953 price would be in 1992 dollars.

Though the Cameras weren't made anymore, the various companies that owned the VM line over the years continued to manufacture and sell the blank reel mounts until the machine broke and Fischer Price decided not to fix it. This led to a comedian delivering a tirade demanding that they fix the machine.

Once the supply of new mounts evaporated, the cost of the remaining NOS mounts and mounts purchased by users but never used skyrocketed. Single blank reels were often sold for $4 and sometimes as high as $8.

There have, over the years, been companies that offered to mount VM images on reels for those not wanting to do their own mounting, mostly through mail order. For those interested in making their own reels but don't want to bother mounting them themselves this could be worth looking into.

There may be other possible uses for VM cameras. It is possible, for example, to scan the images from a film strip taken with the VM camera using a film scanner but this is a rather involved process and the quality of the resulting images is likely to be a disappointment.
