= Slide viewer =

Device for looking at film transparencies

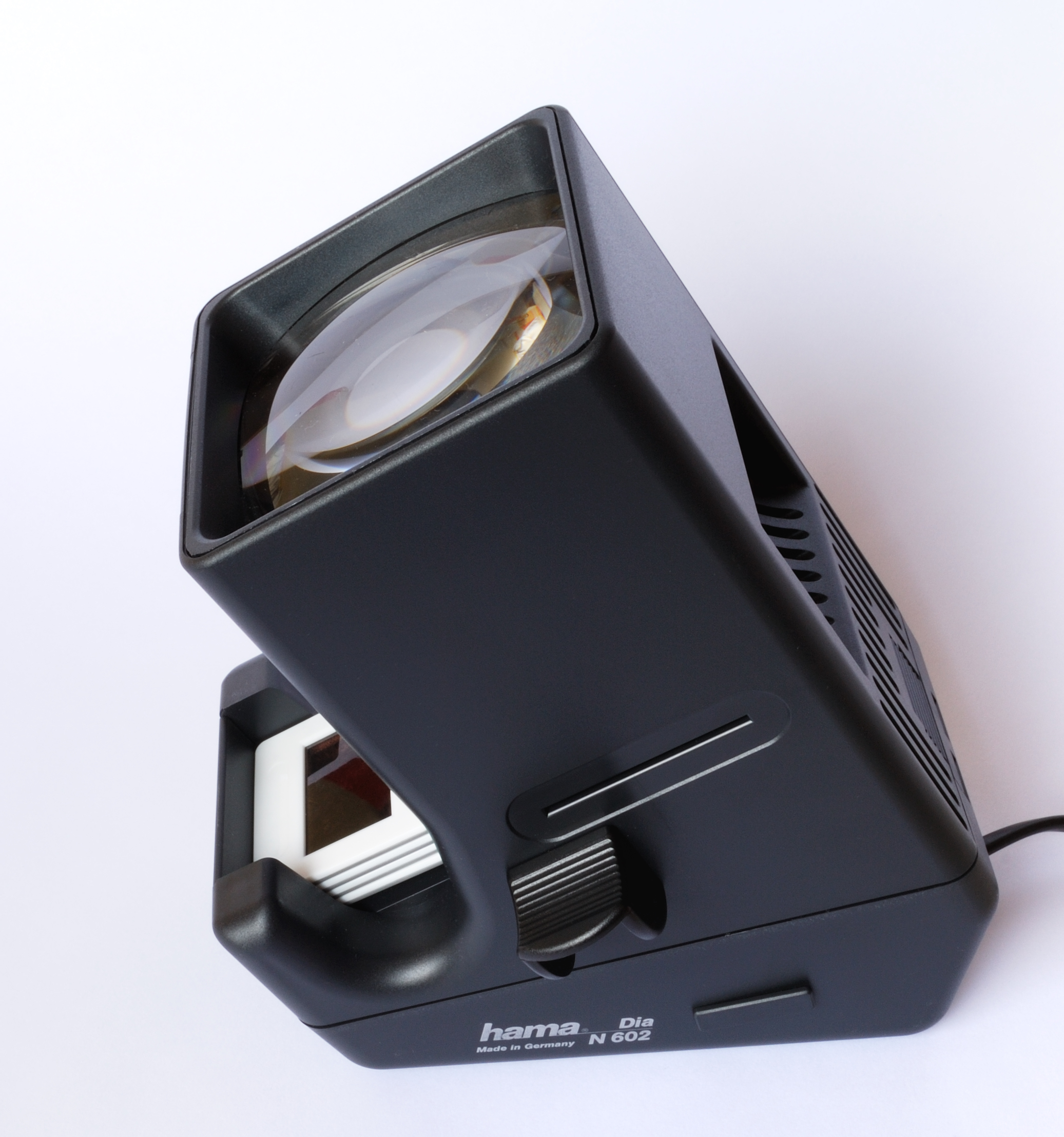
Slide viewer with electric supply

A slide viewer (also called transparency viewer) is a device for looking at film transparencies or similar photographic images.

== Description ==
A slide viewer is usually a small handheld device with a slot in which a slide can be inserted to see a magnified illuminated view of it. A slide viewer is an instrument for individual viewing. Some models have an automatic feeder for inserting multiple slides and some have a slot for a strip of film. The slide viewer may rely upon natural light or incorporate a light source.

== Stereo slide viewer ==
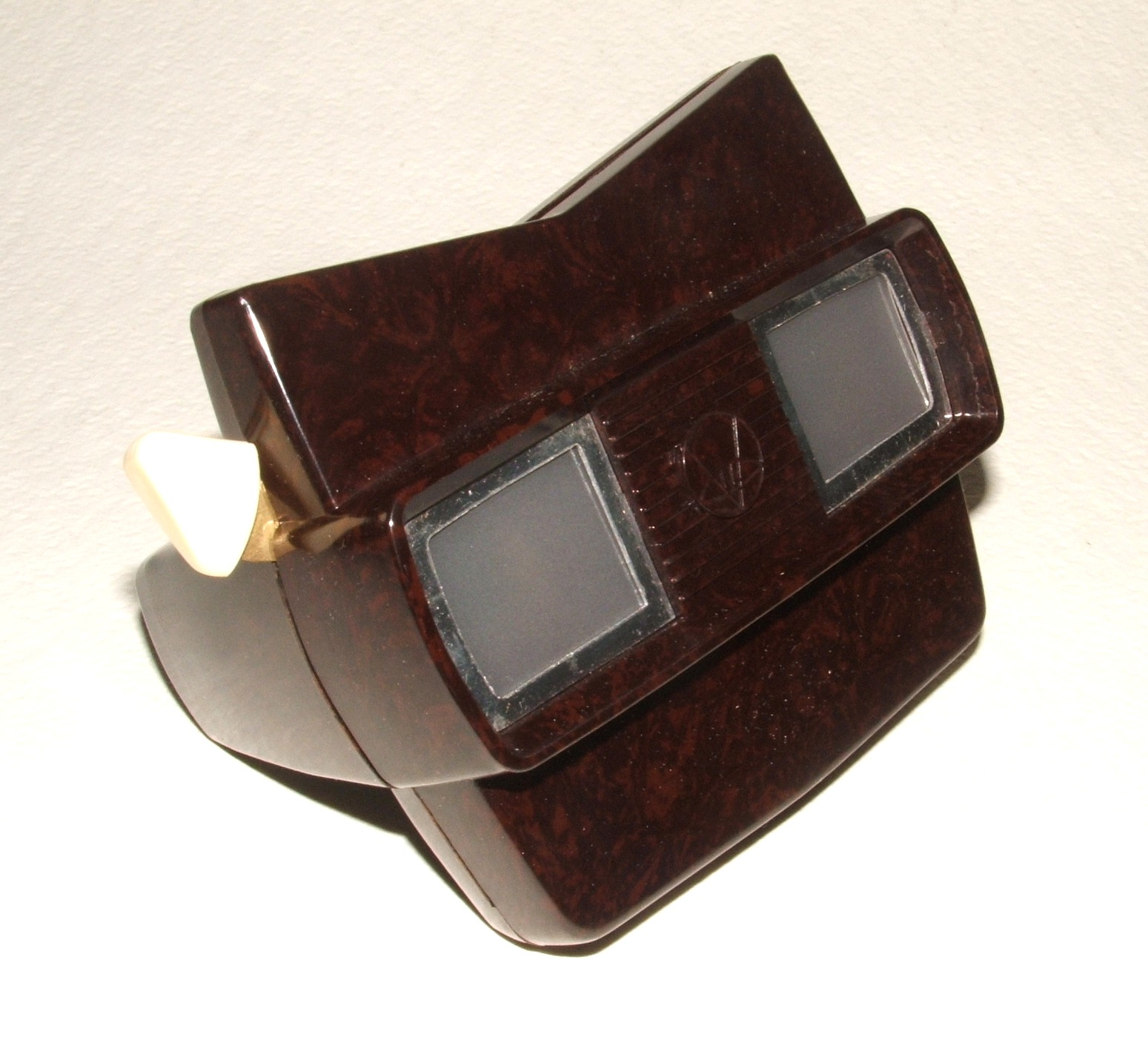
A View-Master Model E of the 1950s

The practice of viewing stereoscopic film-based transparencies through a small magnifying viewer dates to at least as early as 1931, when Tru-Vue began to market black-and-white 35 mm filmstrips that were fed through a handheld viewer made of Bakelite.

In 1939, a radically different viewer, also designed for use with commercially prepared stereo images, was introduced as the View-Master. Images in color on small pieces of Kodachrome film came mounted in rectangular openings near the edge of a cardboard disk, which, despite being quite flat, was officially known as a View-Master "reel". Each reel contained seven image pairs, the left-eye and right-eye images being diametrically opposite. A lever was used to rotate the reel in increments so as to present each image pair in sequence. Eventually, the viewers were available in several models, including some that were illuminated by flashlight bulbs powered by a line current transformer or batteries, as well as "talking" View-Masters. Viewers and reels in the View-Master format are still being made today. One category of material still in production is children's fairy tale story scenes and brief stories using popular cartoon characters. These use photographs of three-dimensional model sets and characters. Another category is scenic views associated with a tourist destination, typically sold at gift shops located at the attraction.

A major innovation in 1947 was the introduction of the Stereo Realist camera and viewer system. Using Kodachrome or other 35 mm slide film, this equipment made startlingly lifelike amateur stereoscopic color photography possible at a reasonable cost. The system was well-advertised and experienced a surge in popularity. Other makes of cameras employing the Realist format began appearing in the early 1950s. The Stereo Realist and competing products can still be found in estate sales and elsewhere, and some enthusiasts still use them to take pictures.

An advantage offered by transparency viewing as compared to earlier card stereoscopes is that a wider field of view may be presented because the images, being illuminated from the rear, may be placed much closer to the lenses. In ordinary viewers, the simple, inexpensive lenses necessarily have relatively long focal lengths so that the entirety of the images will appear reasonably sharp, and consequently the field of view occupied by the images is small. To magnify the images so that they will occupy a much larger visual angle and still be sharp and undistorted, suitable high-quality multi-element short focal length lenses must be used. Such lenses are quite expensive and are not found in most stereo viewers. For optimum realism, the images to be so viewed must be created using equivalent wide-angle camera lenses.

== Gallery ==
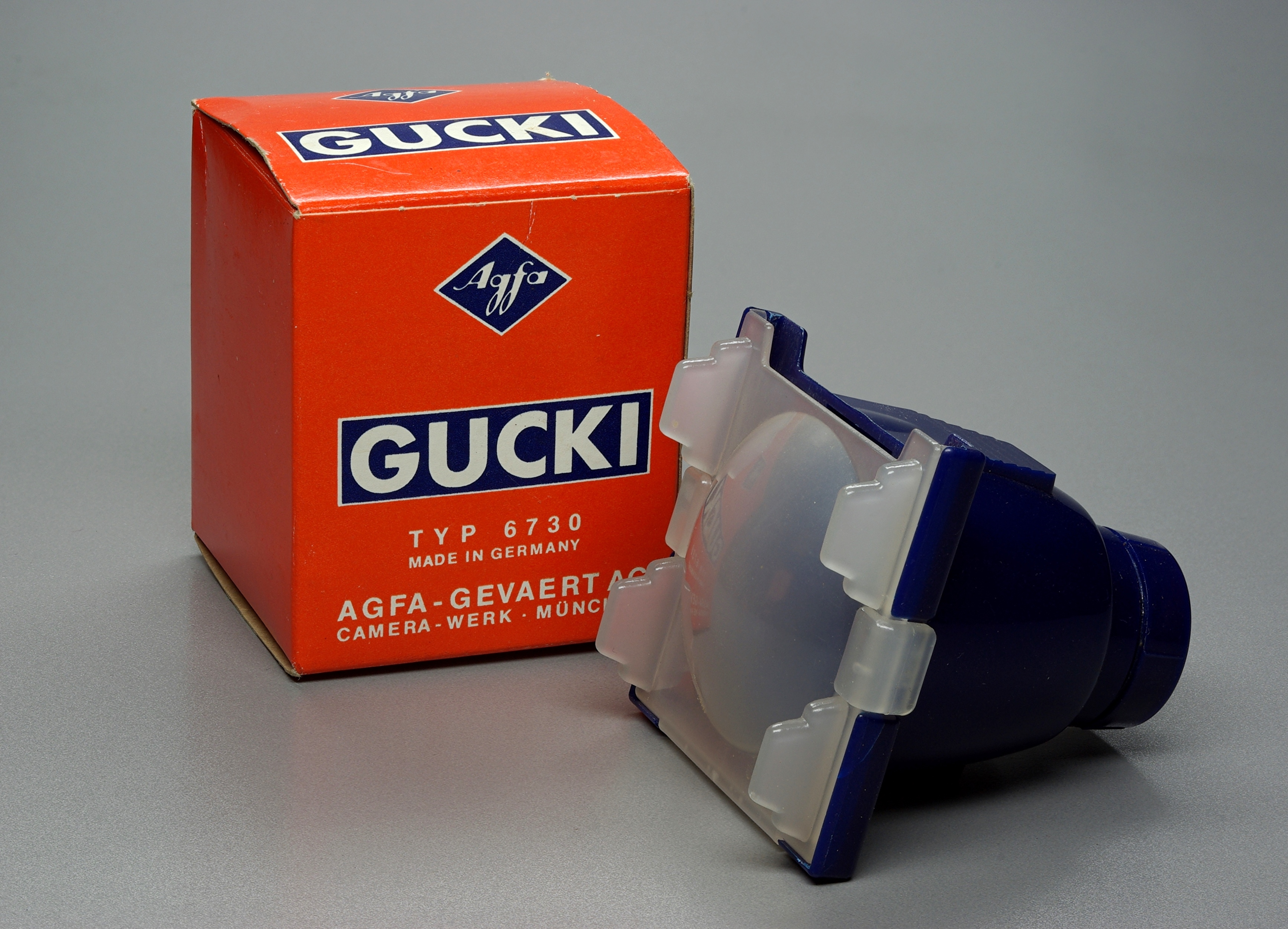
Agfa slide viewer

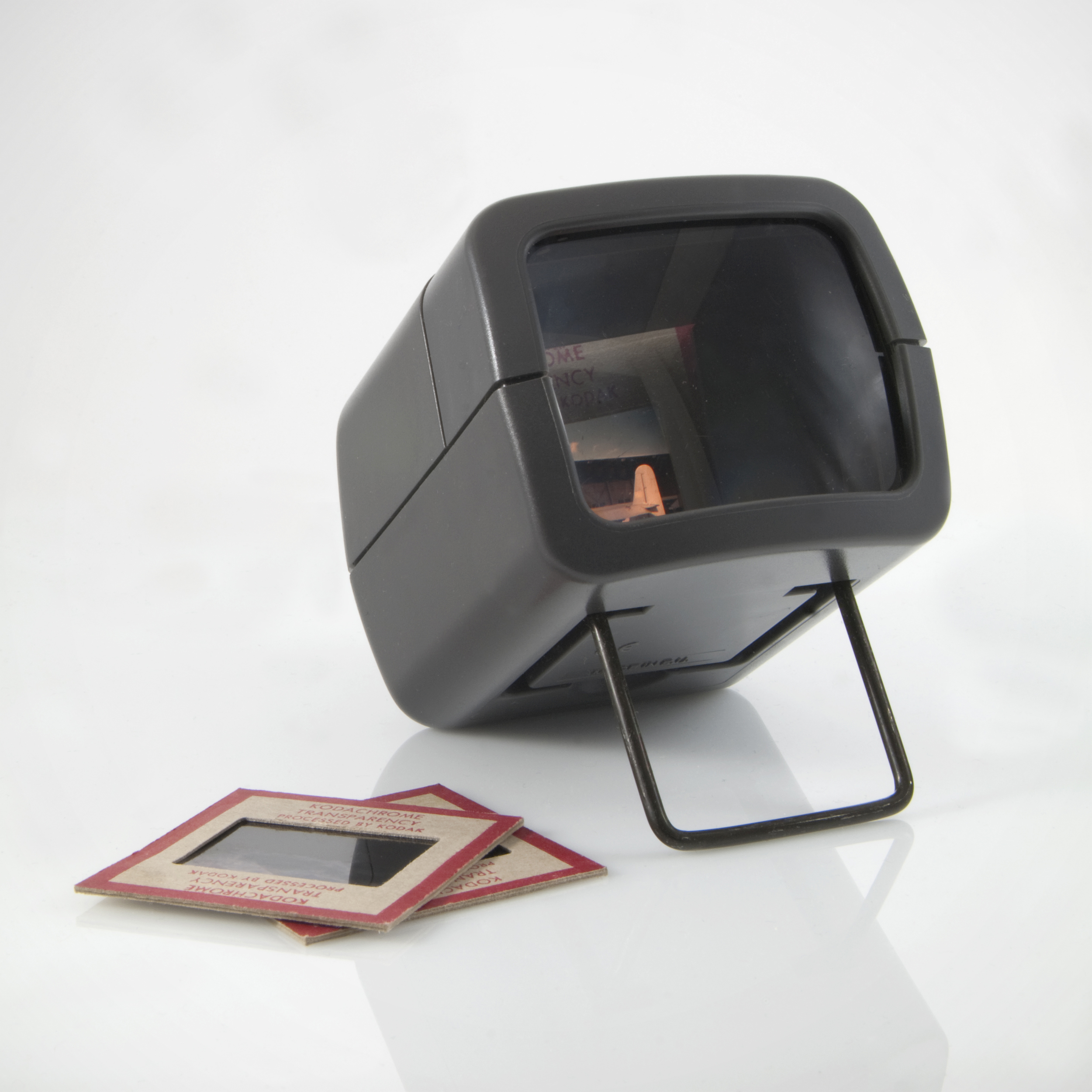
Slide magnifier with slides

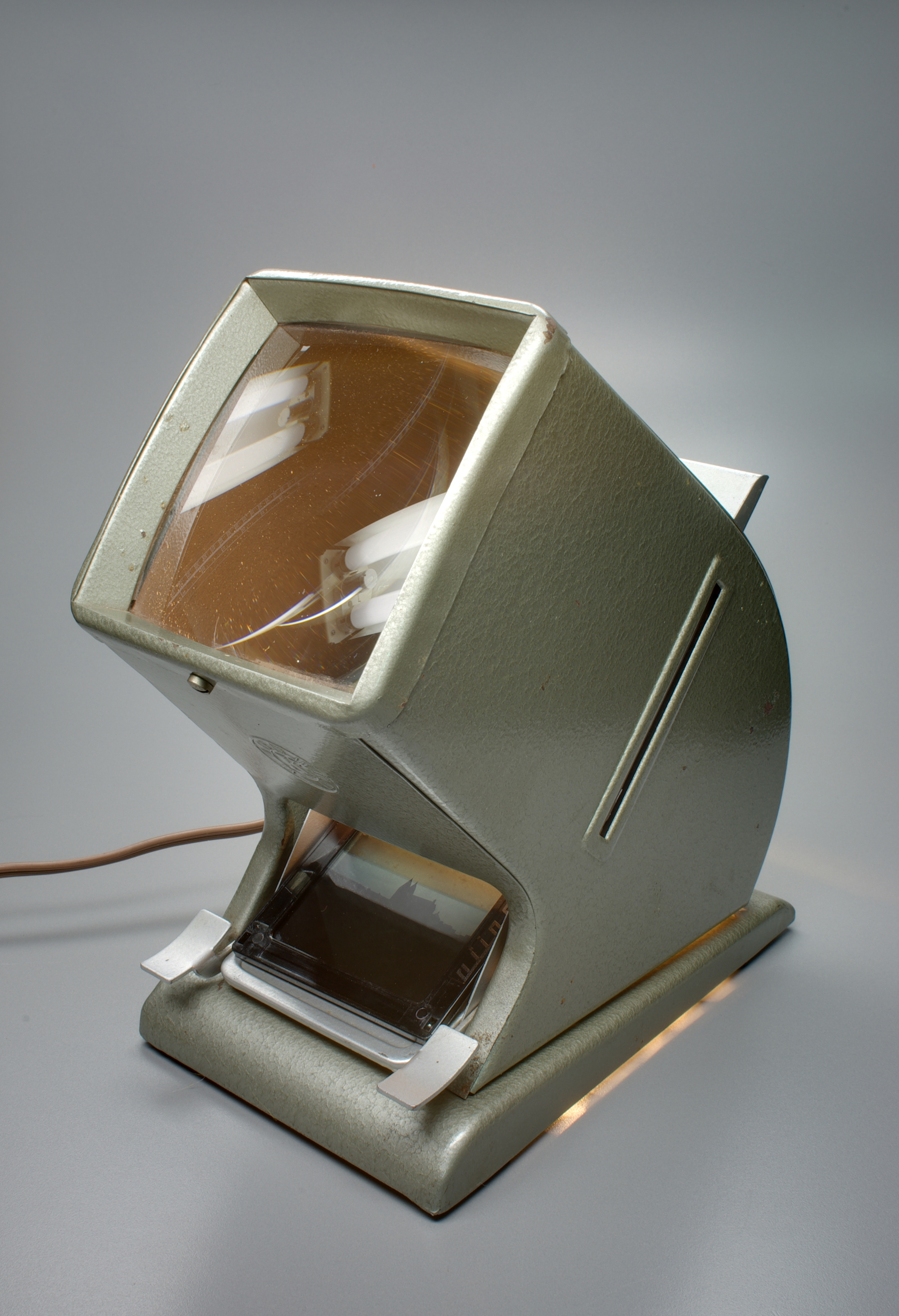
Slide viewer for 6x6 slides

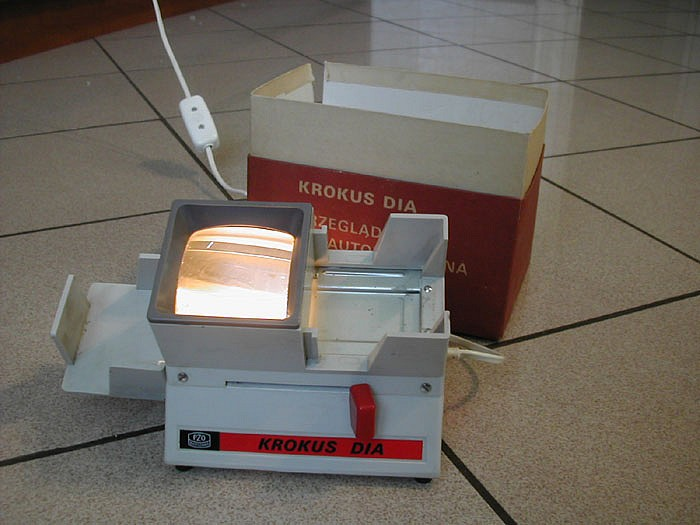
"KROKUS DIA" slide viewer, product of PZO, Poland

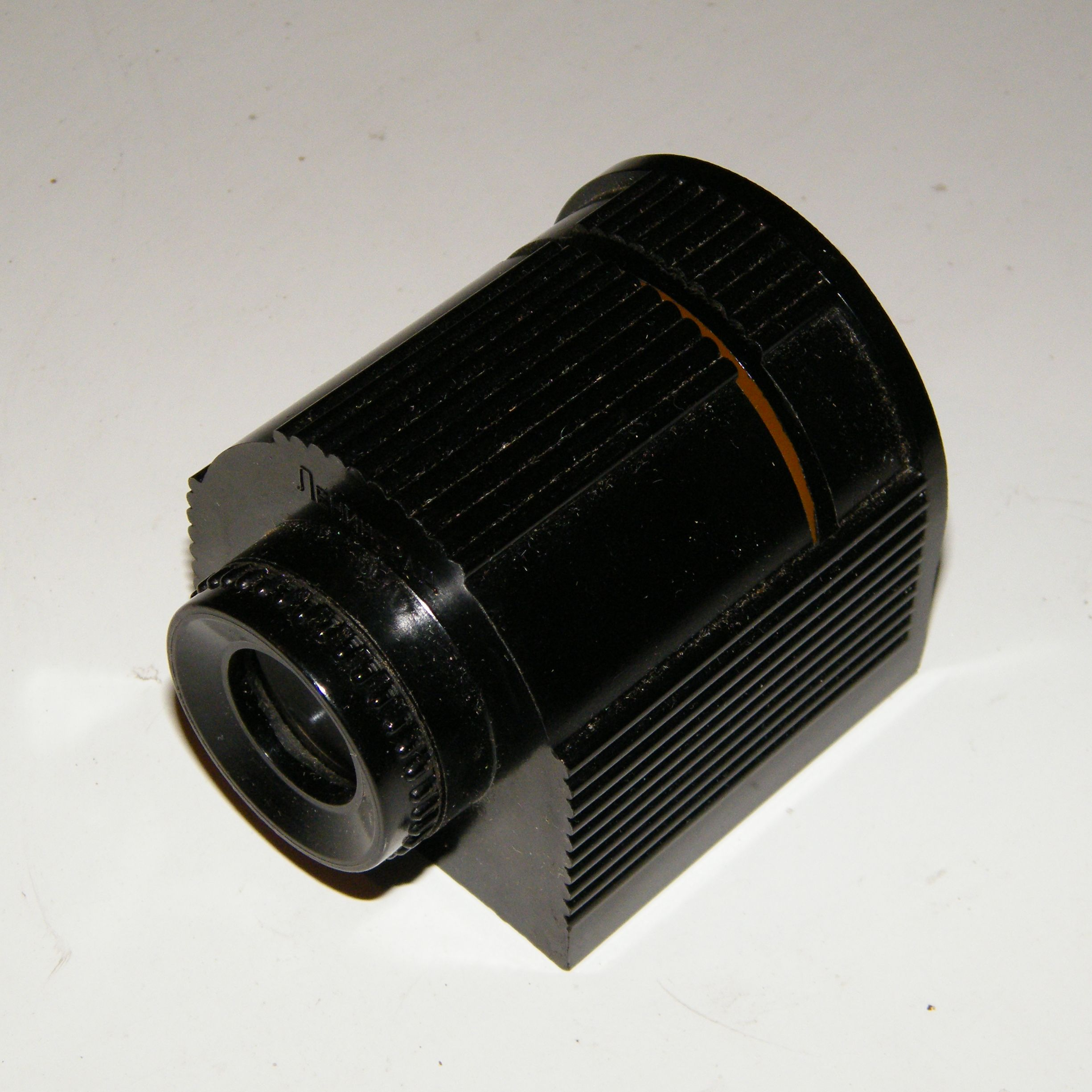
Slide viewer Leningrad (1979)

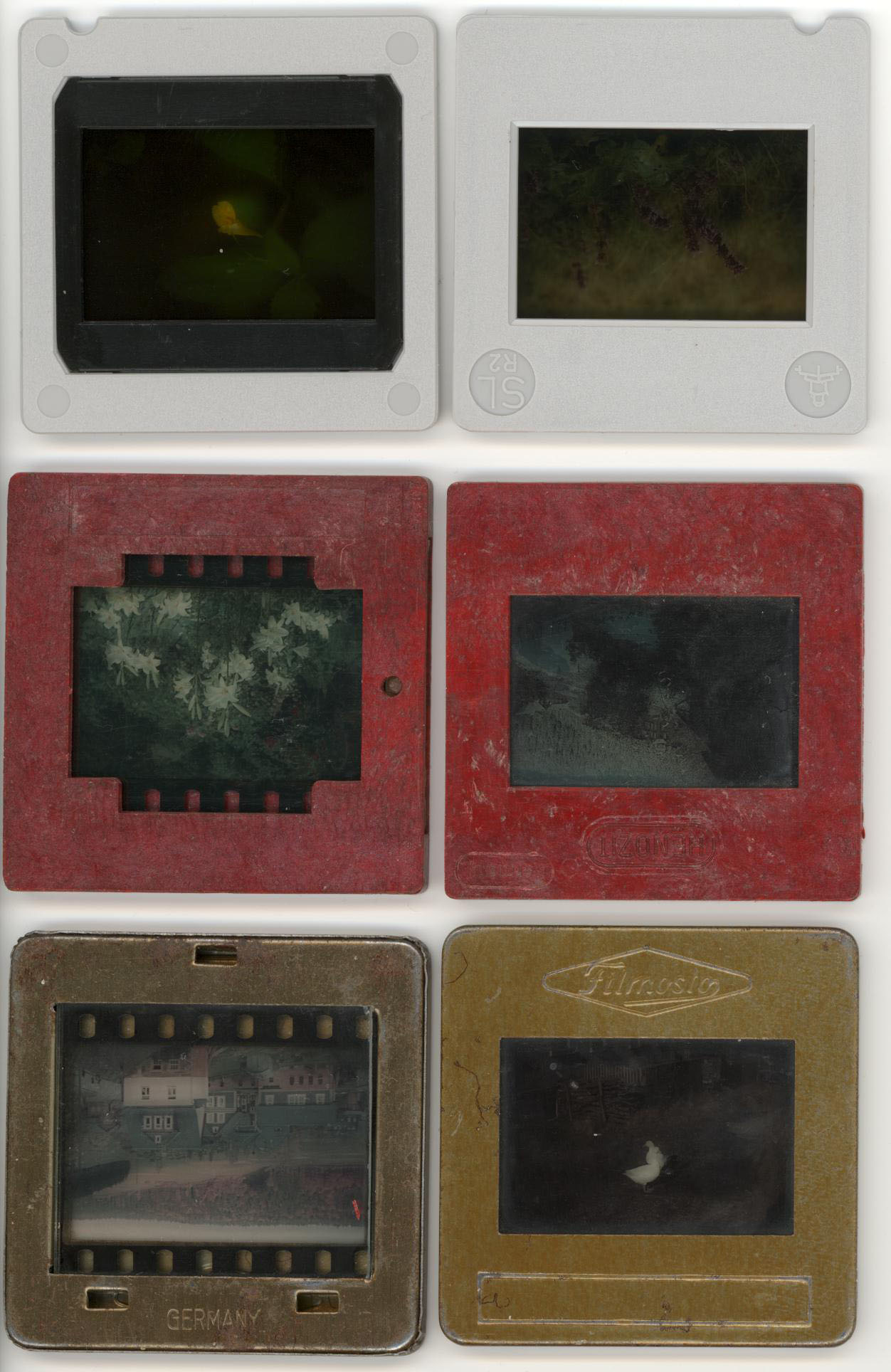
Slide frames, 1940 (metal or card) to 1985 (plastic)

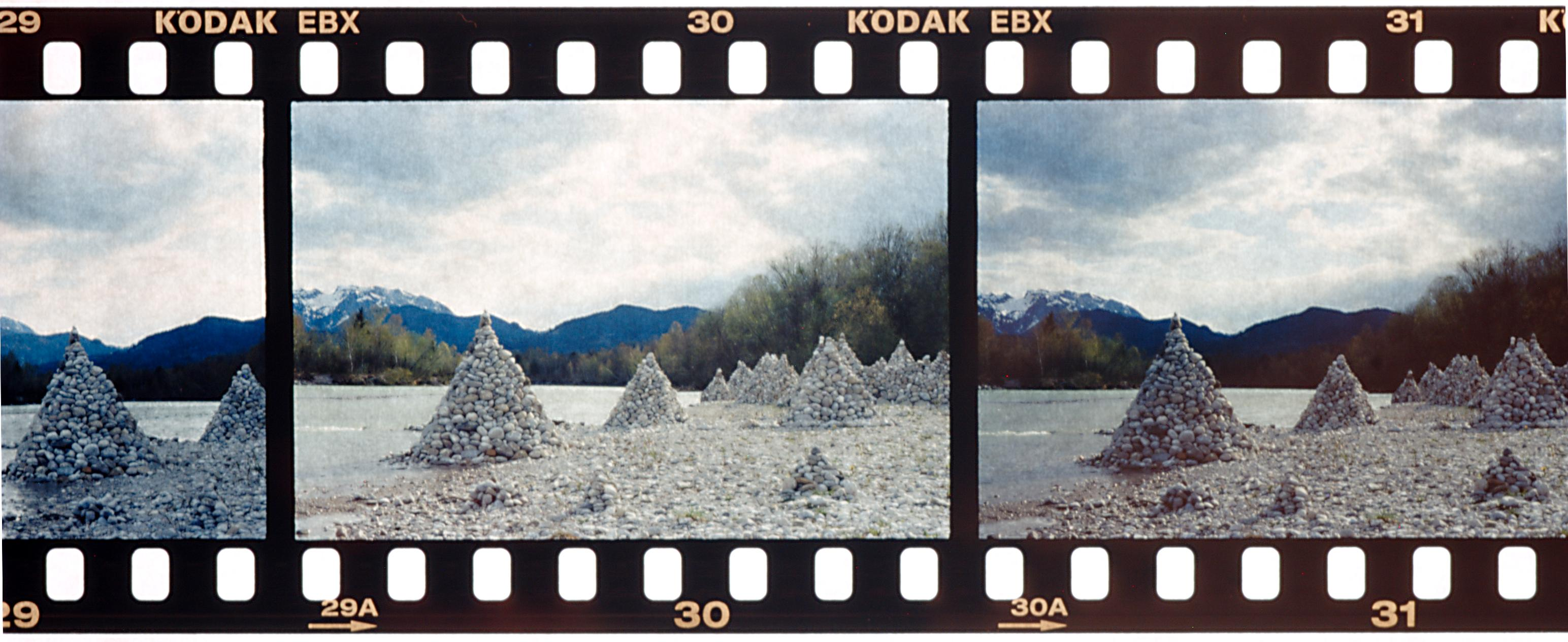
Strip of film

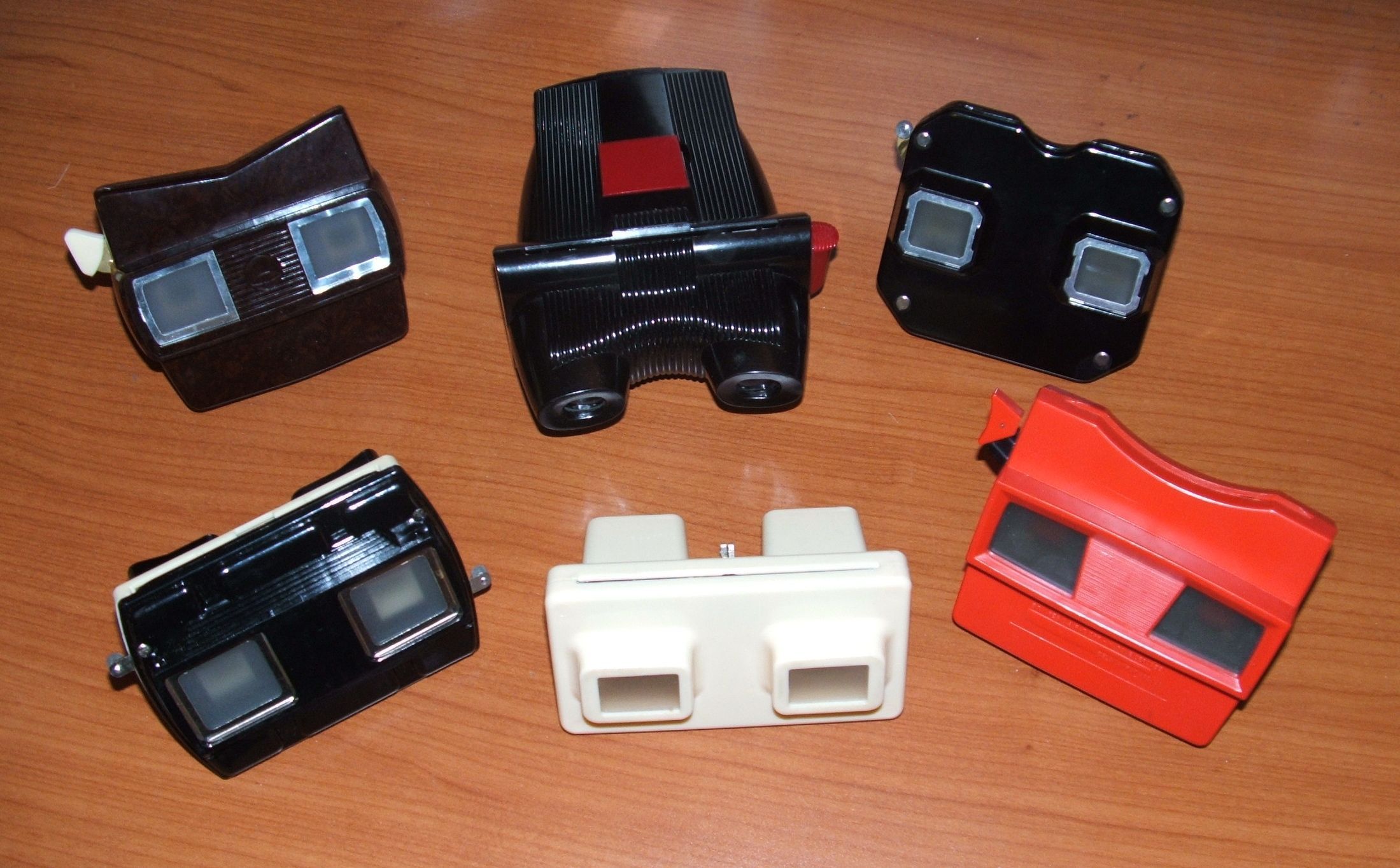
Some 20th century stereoviewers: View-Masters, Stereoclic Brugiere, Stereoscope Lestrade, Tru-Vue

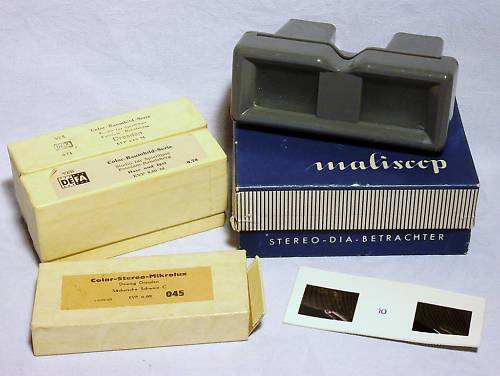
A Maliscop, a 35 mm stereo slide viewer from Heirich Malinski, Leipzig.

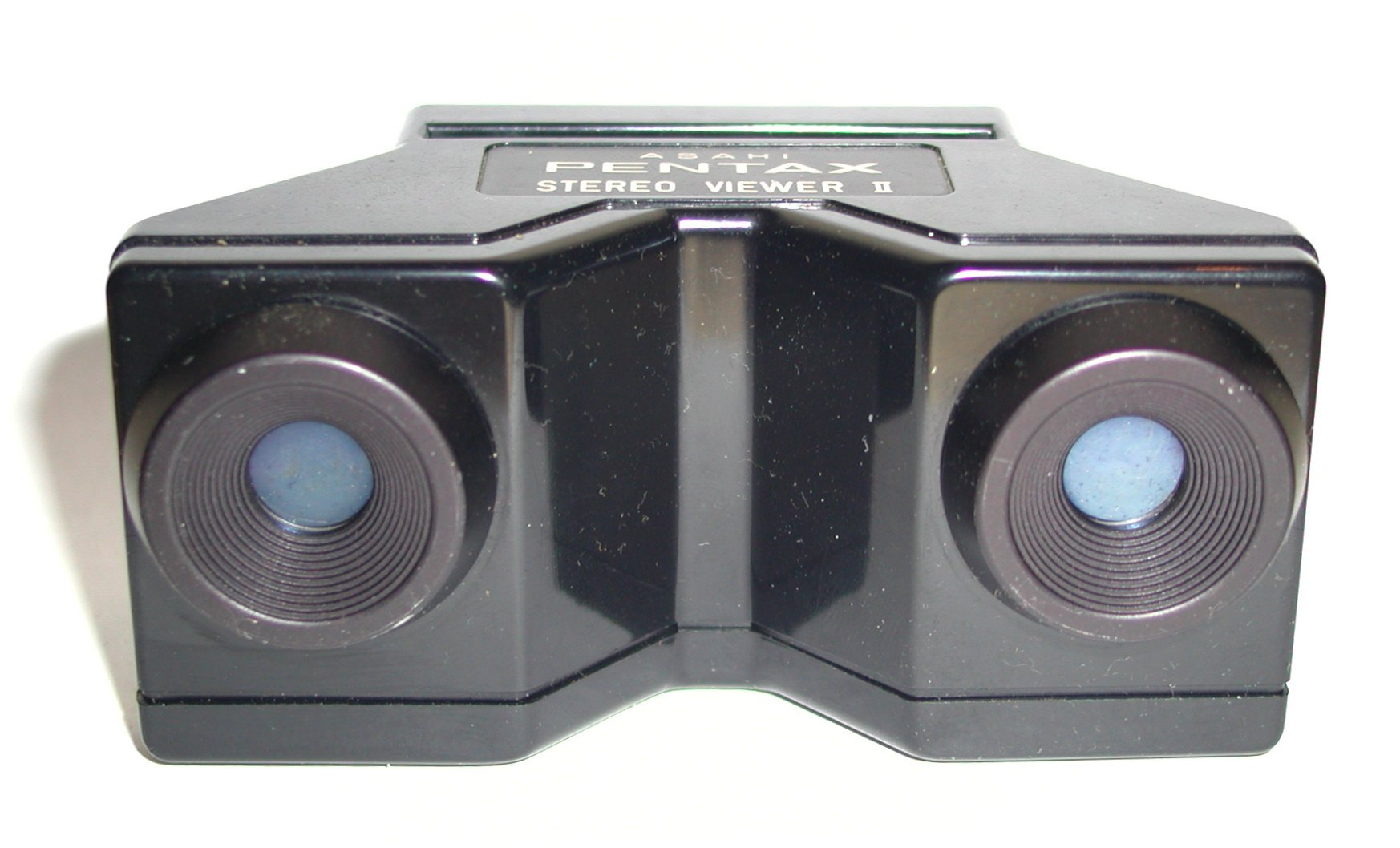
Pentax viewer for 35 mm split-frame stereo slides, portrait-format images

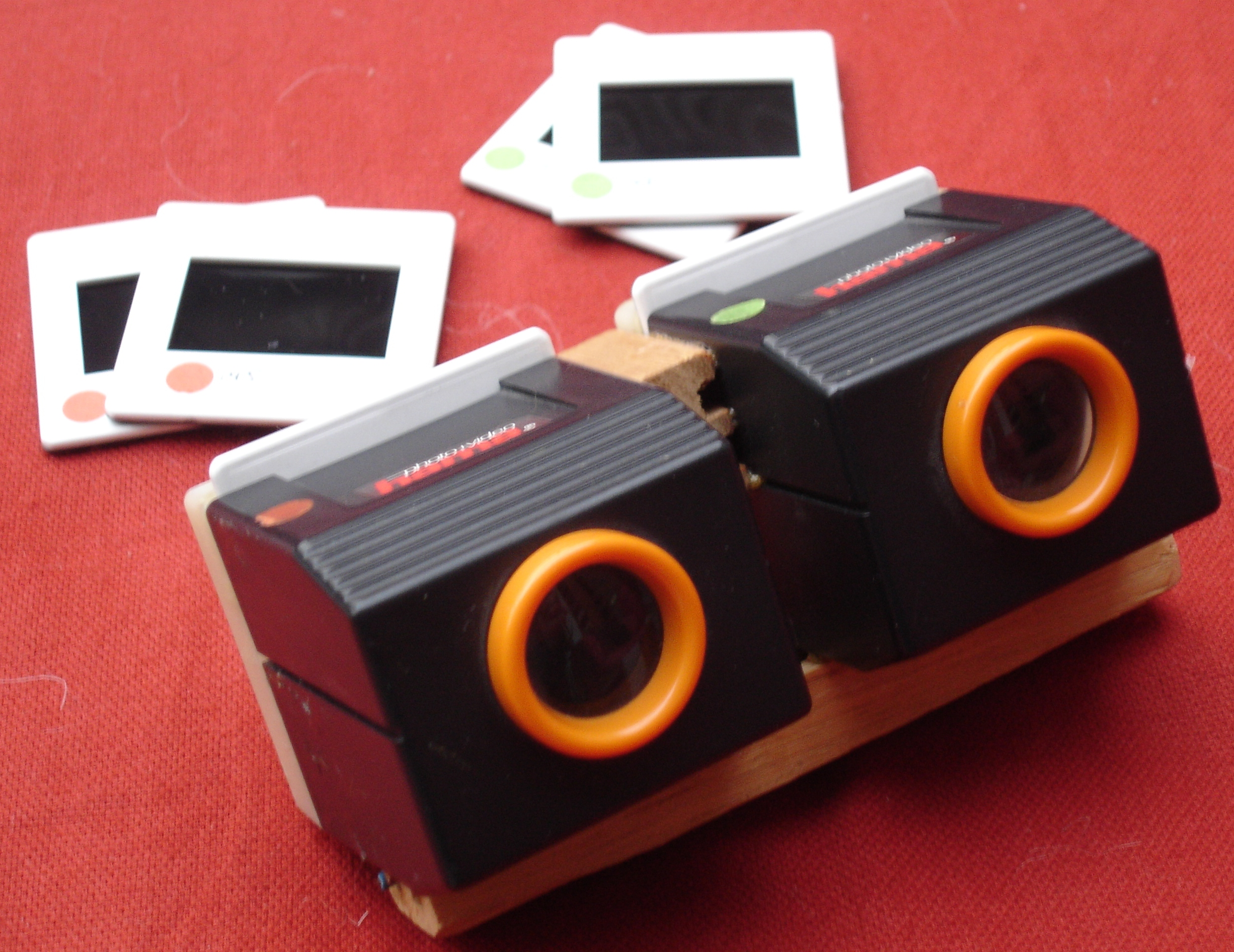
Hama stereo viewer

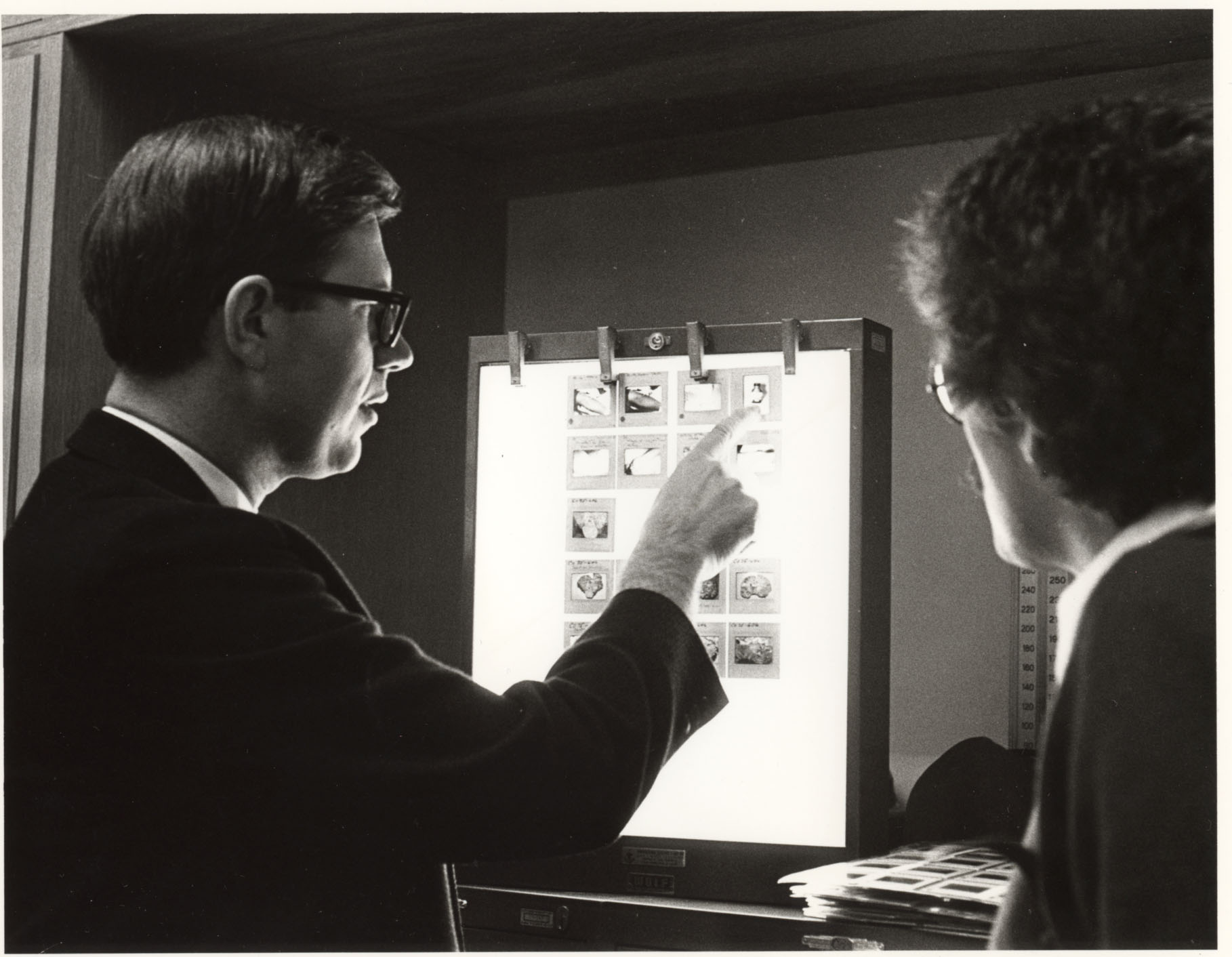
Viewing slides in San Francisco's coroner's office, 1978

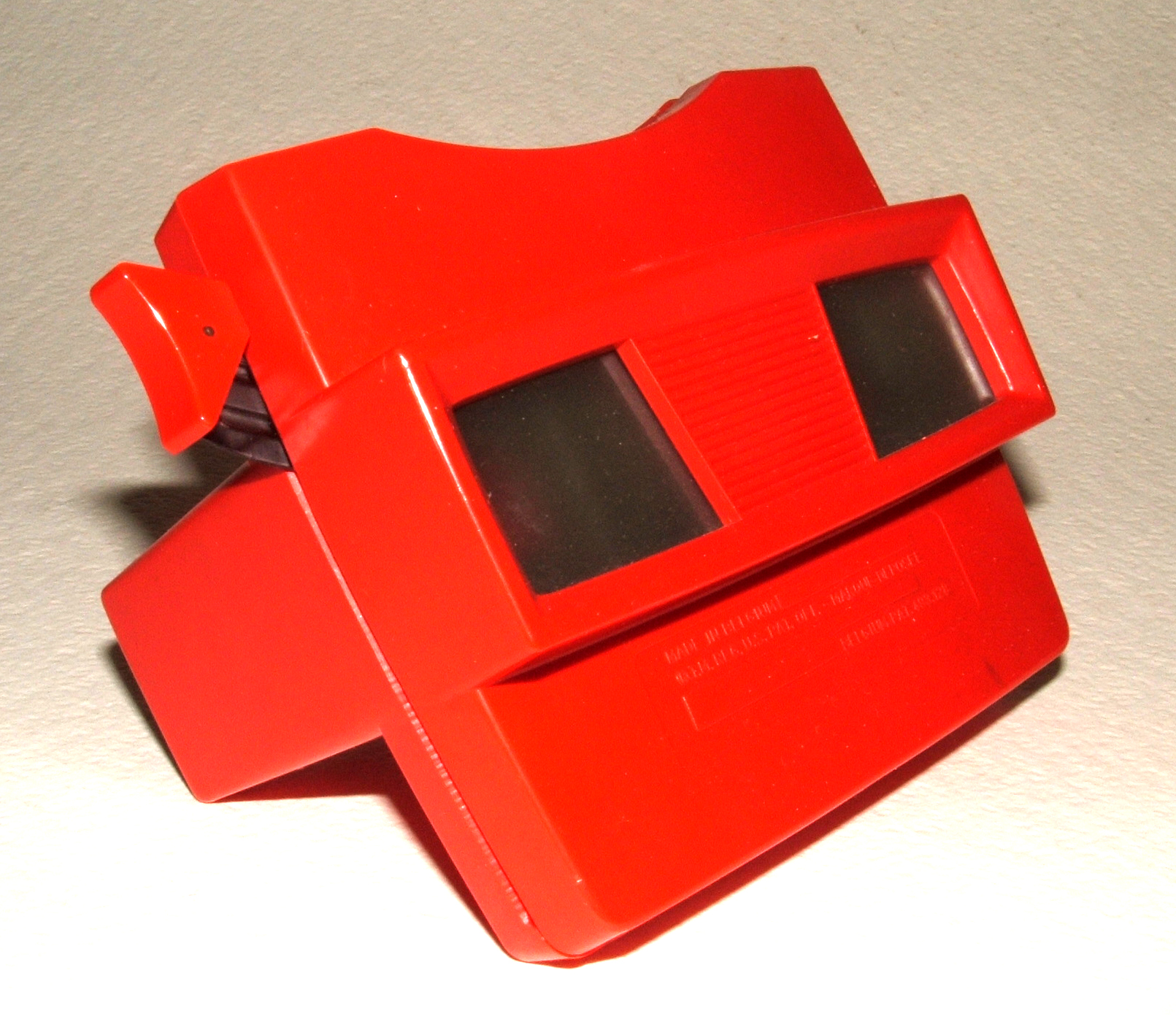
A View-Master Model G, introduced in 1962

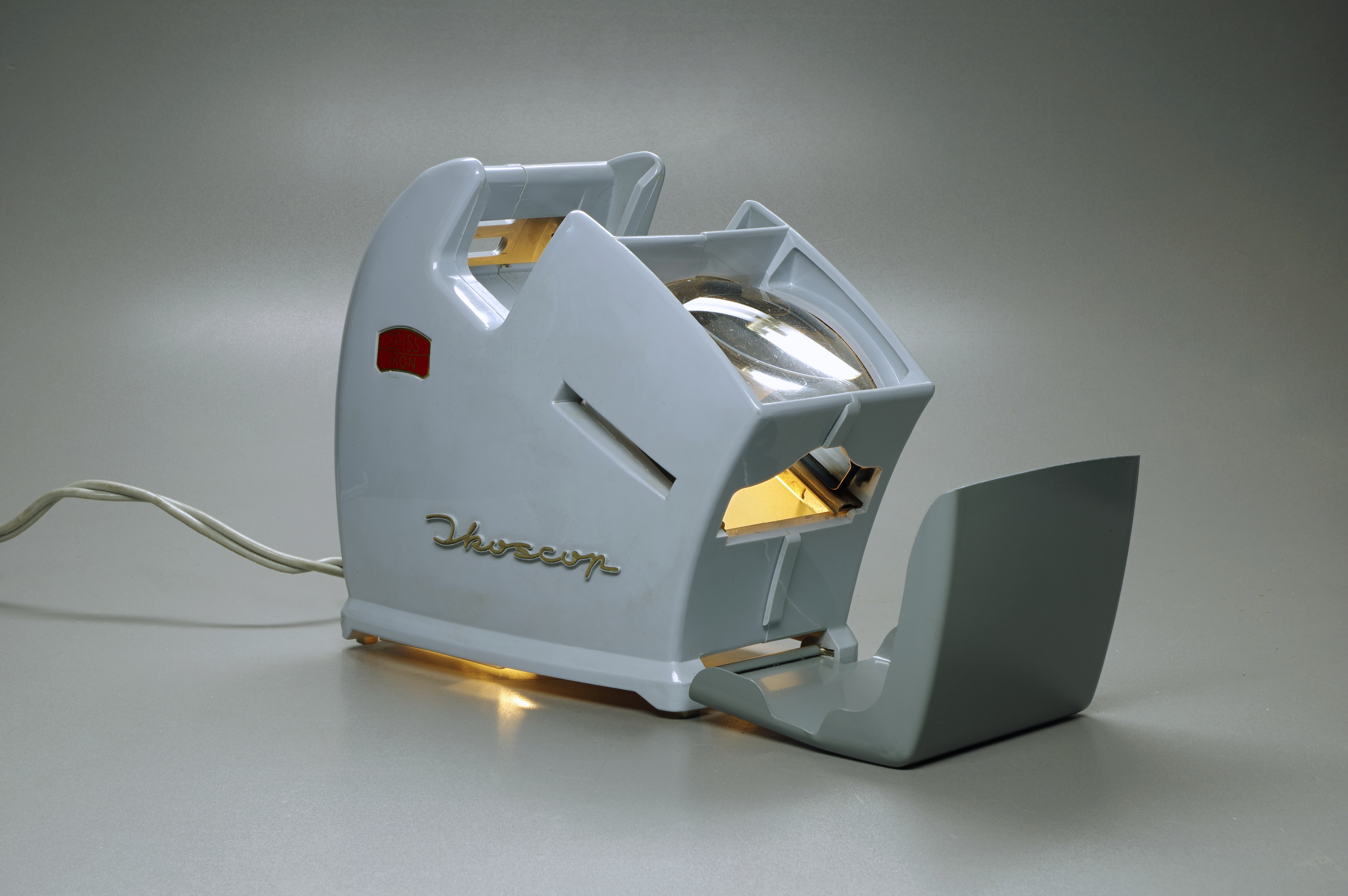
English: Zeiss Icon slide viewer Ikoscop, 1960s

== See also ==
- Loupe
- Slide projector
