= Chuck Hagel =

American politician and soldier (born 1946)

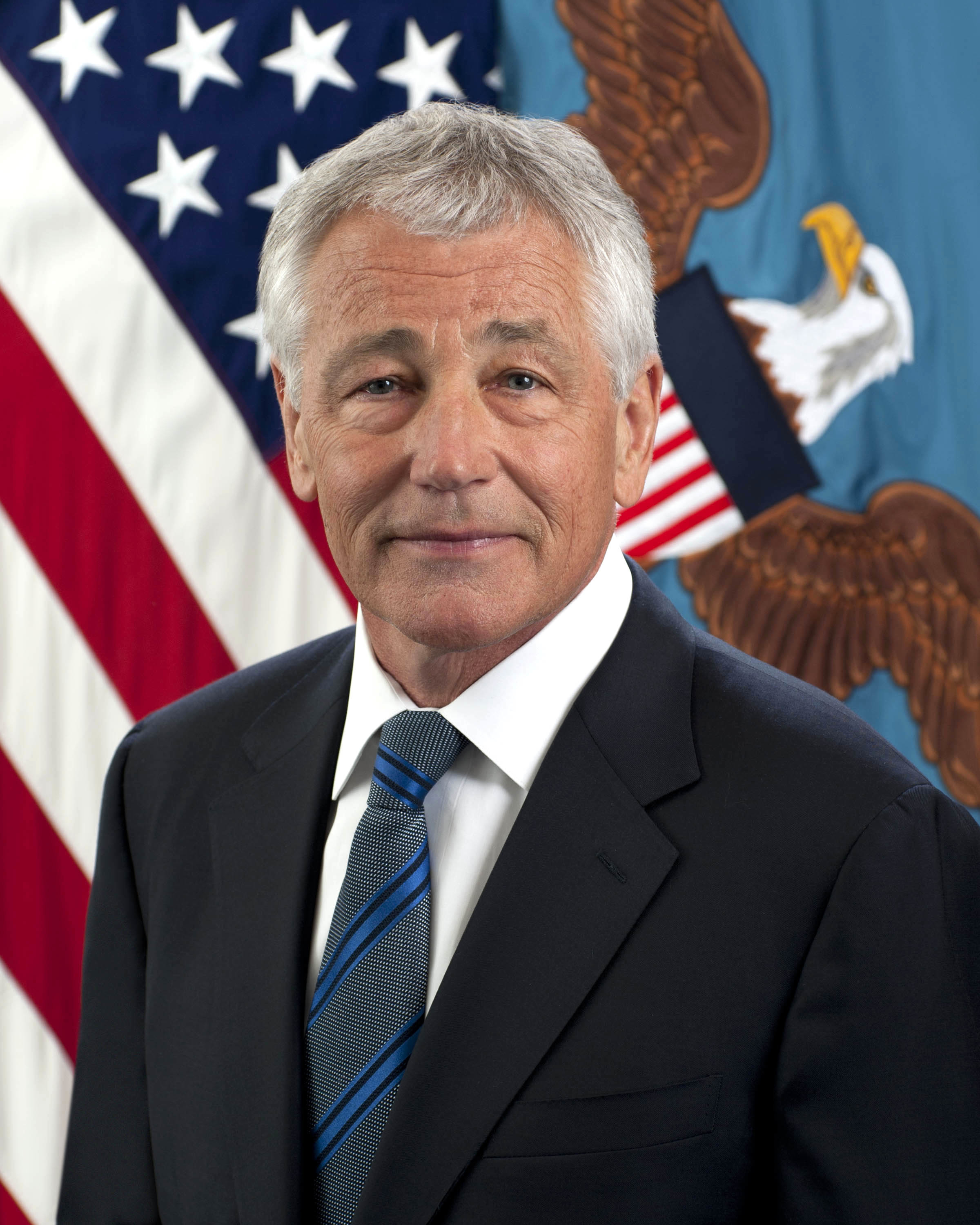
- Official portrait, 2013

24th United States Secretary of Defense
- In office February 27, 2013 – February 17, 2015
- President: Barack Obama
- Deputy: Ash Carter; Christine Fox (acting); Robert O. Work
- Preceded by: Leon Panetta
- Succeeded by: Ash Carter

Chair of the President's Intelligence Advisory Board
- In office October 28, 2009 – February 27, 2013; Served with David Boren
- President: Barack Obama
- Preceded by: Steve Friedman
- Succeeded by: Shirley Ann Jackson; Jami Miscik (2014)

Chair of the Intelligence Oversight Board
- In office October 28, 2009 – February 27, 2013
- President: Barack Obama
- Preceded by: Steve Friedman
- Succeeded by: Dan Meltzer

United States Senator from Nebraska
- In office January 3, 1997 – January 3, 2009
- Preceded by: J. James Exon
- Succeeded by: Mike Johanns

Personal details
- Born: Charles Timothy Hagel; October 4, 1946 (age 80) North Platte, Nebraska, U.S.
- Party: Republican
- Spouses: Patricia Lloyd (m. 1979; div. 1982); Lilibet Ziller (m. 1985)
- Children: 2
- Education: Brown College (attended); University of Nebraska, Omaha (BGS)

Military service
- Allegiance: United States
- Branch/service: United States Army
- Years of service: 1967–1968
- Rank: Sergeant
- Unit: 2nd Battalion, 47th Infantry Regiment; 9th Infantry Division
- Battles/wars: Vietnam War (WIA)
- Awards: Purple Heart (2); Army Commendation Medal; Vietnam Gallantry Cross; Combat Infantryman Badge
- Hagel's voice Hagel at a Senate Foreign Relations Committee hearing on the AUMF against Syria. Recorded September 3, 2013

Charles Timothy Hagel (/ˈheɪɡəl/ HAY-gəl; born October 4, 1946) is an American politician, businessman and Army veteran who served as the 24th United States secretary of defense from 2013 to 2015 in the administration of Barack Obama. He previously served as chairman of the president's Intelligence Advisory Board from 2009 to 2013 and as a United States senator representing Nebraska from 1997 to 2009.

A recipient of two Purple Hearts while an infantry squad leader in the Vietnam War, Hagel returned home to start careers in business and politics. He co-founded Vanguard Cellular, the primary source of his personal wealth, and served as president of the McCarthy Group, an investment banking firm, and CEO of American Information Systems Inc., a computerized voting machine manufacturer. A member of the Republican Party, Hagel was first elected to the United States Senate in 1996. He was reelected in 2002, but did not run in 2008.

On January 7, 2013, President Barack Obama nominated Hagel to serve as Secretary of Defense. On February 12, 2013, the Senate Armed Services Committee approved Hagel's nomination by a vote of 14–11. On February 14, 2013, Senate Republicans did not vote with Democrats so there were not 60 votes needed to end the debate on Hagel's nomination and proceed to a final vote, citing the need for further review. It was the first time that a nominee for Secretary of Defense was filibustered, although candidates for other cabinet offices had been filibustered before. On February 26, 2013, the Senate voted for cloture on Hagel's nomination and confirmed him by a vote of 58–41. He took office on February 27, 2013, as his predecessor, Leon Panetta, stepped down.

Hagel previously served as a professor at the Edmund A. Walsh School of Foreign Service at Georgetown University, chairman of the Atlantic Council, and co-chairman of the President's Intelligence Advisory Board. Before his appointment as Secretary of Defense, Hagel served on a number of boards of directors, including that of Chevron Corporation.

On November 24, 2014, it was announced that Hagel would resign following conflicts within the administration, particularly relating to issues concerning ISIL.

== Early life, education, military, and early political career ==
Hagel was born in North Platte, Nebraska, a son of Charles Dean Hagel, and his wife Elizabeth (Betty) Dunn. His father was of German heritage, while his mother was of Irish and Polish ancestry. Growing up, Hagel lived across Nebraska; in Ainsworth, Rushville, Scottsbluff, Terrytown, York and Columbus. Hagel was the oldest of four brothers. His father, a veteran of World War II, died suddenly on Christmas morning, 1962, at the age of 39, when Hagel was 16. He graduated from St. Bonaventure High School (now Scotus Central Catholic High School) in Columbus, Nebraska, in 1964, attended Brown Institute for radio and TV through 1966, and earned a BGS degree with a concentration in history from the University of Nebraska Omaha in 1971.

Hagel volunteered to be drafted into the United States Army during the Vietnam War, rejecting a draft board recommendation that he go to college instead. He served in the United States Army infantry in Vietnam from 1967 to 1968. As a sergeant (E-5), he served as an infantry squad leader in the 9th Infantry Division. Hagel served in the same infantry squad as his younger brother Tom, and they are thought to be the only American brothers to have done so during the war. They also saved each other's lives on separate occasions. Hagel received the Vietnamese Cross of Gallantry, two Purple Hearts, the Army Commendation Medal, and the Combat Infantryman Badge.

After his discharge, he worked as a radio newscaster and talk show host in Omaha from 1969 to 1971 while finishing college on Veterans Administration (VA) assistance under the GI Bill.

In 1971, Hagel was hired as a staffer for Congressman John Y. McCollister (R-NE), serving until 1977. For the next four years, he worked as a lobbyist for Firestone Tire and Rubber Company, and in 1980, he served as an organizer for the successful presidential campaign of former California governor Ronald Reagan.

After Reagan's inauguration as president, Hagel was named deputy administrator of the Veterans Administration. In 1982, however, he resigned over a disagreement with VA Administrator Robert P. Nimmo, who was intent on cutting funding for VA programs. Nimmo had referred to veterans groups as "greedy", and to Agent Orange as not much worse than a "little teenage acne."

== Business career (1982–1996) ==
After leaving government employment, Hagel co-founded Vanguard Cellular, a mobile phone service carrier that made him a multi-millionaire. While working with Vanguard, he served as president and chief executive officer of the United Service Organizations and the Private Sector Council, as deputy director and chief operating officer of the 1990 G7 Summit, and on the board of directors or advisory committee of the American Red Cross, the Eisenhower World Affairs Institute, Bread for the World, and the Ripon Society. He also served as Chairman of the Agent Orange Settlement Fund and is a member of the Council on Foreign Relations.

Although he was pressured by some to run for Governor of Virginia, where he had lived for 20 years, in 1992 Hagel moved back to Nebraska to become president of the McCarthy Group, LLC, an investment banking firm. He also served as a chairman and was CEO of American Information Systems Inc. (AIS), later known as Election Systems & Software, a computerized voting machine manufacturer jointly owned by McCarthy Group, LLC and the Omaha World-Herald company. On March 15, 1995, Hagel resigned from the board of AIS as he intended to run for office. Michael McCarthy, the parent company's founder, was Hagel's campaign treasurer. Until at least 2003, he retained between $1 million and $5 million in stock in Election Systems & Software's parent company, the McCarthy Group.

== U.S. Senate (1997–2009) ==
=== Elections ===
In 1996, Hagel ran for the open US Senate seat created by the retirement of Democrat J. James Exon. Hagel's opponent was Ben Nelson, then the sitting governor of Nebraska. Hagel won and became the first Republican in 24 years to win a Senate seat in Nebraska. Six years later, in 2002, Hagel overwhelmingly won re-election with over 83% of the vote, the largest margin of victory in any statewide race in Nebraska history.

=== Senate voting record ===
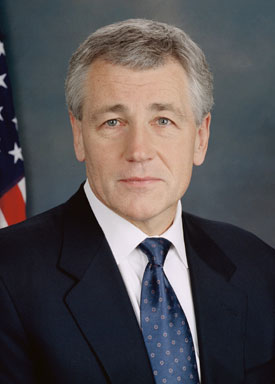
Hagel's portrait as a senator.

According to David Boaz, of the Cato Institute, during the Bush administration, Hagel maintained a "traditionally Republican" voting record, receiving "a lifetime rating of 84 percent from the American Conservative Union and consistent A and B grades from the National Taxpayers Union." On the Issues describes Hagel as a "libertarian-leaning conservative." According to Boaz, among his most notable votes, Hagel:

- Voted for the Patriot Act;
- Voted for the 2001 and 2003 tax cuts;
- Voted against No Child Left Behind;
- Voted against the Medicare prescription drug bill;
- Voted against McCain-Feingold.

==== Foreign policy ====
Hagel co-sponsored the failed Kosovo Resolution, authorizing the use of U.S. military force against the Federal Republic of Yugoslavia.

After the September 11 attacks, Hagel voted in favor of Senate Joint Resolution 23, authorizing "necessary and appropriate U.S. Military force" in Afghanistan against those who planned or aided the September 11 attacks. During his tenure in the Senate, Hagel continued his support for NATO involvement, and funding in the War in Afghanistan. In a 2009 The Washington Post op-ed after being nominated as Chairman of President Obama's Intelligence advisory board, Hagel said that "We cannot view U.S. involvement in Iraq and Afghanistan through a lens that sees only 'winning' or 'losing,' Iraq and Afghanistan are not America's to win or lose." And that "We can help them buy time or develop, but we cannot control their fates." In 2011, after he left office, Hagel stated that President Obama needs to start "looking for the exit in Afghanistan", and that "We need to start winding this down."

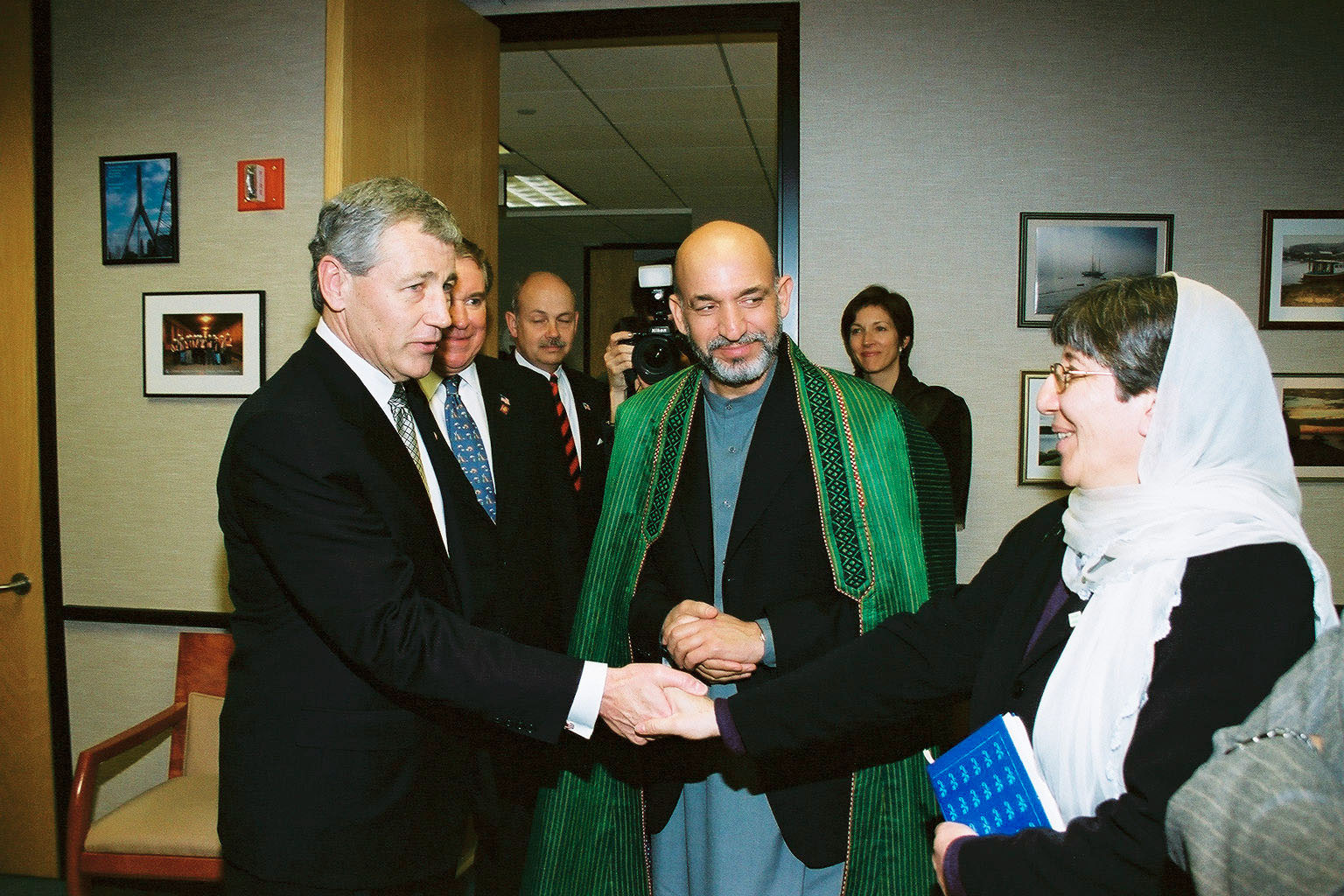
Hagel in a 2002 visit with Afghan President Hamid Karzai, and Afghan Minister of Women's Affairs Sima Samar

On October 11, 2002, Hagel, along with 76 other senators, voted in favor of the Iraq Resolution. Hagel, a later critic of the war, commented on his vote authorizing the use of force against Iraq saying,

How many of us really know and understand much about Iraq, the country, the history, the people, the role in the Arab world? I approach the issue of post-Saddam Iraq and the future of democracy and stability in the Middle East with more caution, realism, and a bit more humility.

In July 2007, Hagel was one of three Republican senators who supported Democratic-proposed legislation requiring a troop withdrawal from Iraq to begin within 120 days. He told Robert D. Novak "This thing is really coming undone quickly, and [Prime Minister] Maliki's government is weaker by the day. The police are corrupt, top to bottom. The oil problem is a huge problem. They still can't get anything through the parliament—no hydrocarbon law, no de-Baathification law, no provincial elections." In 2008, along with then-Senator (and presumptive Democratic nominee for president) Barack Obama, and Senator Jack Reed (D-RI), Hagel visited Iraq in a congressional delegation trip, meeting with U.S. service members, General David Petraeus, and the prime minister of Iraq Nouri al-Maliki. While talking to reporters in Iraq, Hagel said, "Each one of us who has a responsibility of helping lead this country needs to reflect on what we think is in the interests of our country, not the interest of our party or our president."

==== National security ====
In his first term in the Senate, Hagel voted in favor of the Chemical and Biological Weapons Threat Reduction Act, establishing criminal penalties for possession of Chemical or Biological weapons, and he cosponsored the American Missile Protection Act, deploying an effective National Missile Defense system capable of defending the U.S. against limited ballistic missile attacks. Hagel voted to establish the United States Department of Homeland Security, and supported increasing Defense Department spending, voting in favor of the National Defense Authorization Act every year he served in the Senate. Hagel voted for spending increases in preventing HIV/AIDS, tuberculosis, and malaria funding, and voting against caps on the U.S.'s foreign aid budget.

==== Veterans affairs ====
In 2007, Hagel introduced Senate Amendment 2032, amending the Defense Authorization bill limiting the deployment of U.S. service members serving in Iraq to 12 months. The amendment needed 60 votes in the Senate to pass, and was ultimately defeated in a 52–45 vote. In 2008, Hagel was a principal co-sponsor with two other veterans in the Senate of Senator Jim Webb's "21st Century GI Bill" which passed Congress as the Post-9/11 Veterans Educational Assistance Act of 2008, expanding education assistance to veterans who served after the September 11, 2001, terrorist attacks. During his tenure in the Senate, Hagel supported the military's "Don't ask, don't tell" policy, barring openly LGBT members of the armed forces from serving, but was later described as "pro-ending don't ask, don't tell."

==== Civil liberties ====
In 2001, Hagel voted in favor of the Patriot Act. Although Hagel originally indicated a "nay" vote in reauthorizing expiring provisions of the Patriot Act in 2006, Hagel voted in favor of reauthorization. After calls from the Bush administration for the House and Senate to reform FISA, the House introduced the Protect America Act of 2007, expanding provisions allowing electronic surveillance of foreigners outside of the U.S. with a warrant. In a 68–29 vote, the Protect America Act of 2007 passed the Senate, with Hagel voting to expand FISA's provisions on warrantless surveillance.

Hagel voted in favor of Senate Amendment 2022, restoring habeas corpus, the right to due process, to American citizens detained at Guantanamo Bay detention camp, but voted against a similar resolution restoring it to all prisoners detained at Guantanamo. In response to the Bush administration's intentions to keep Guantanamo Bay open permanently, Hagel said the military prison is why the U.S. is "losing the image war around the world," and that "It's identifiable with, for right or wrong, a part of America that people in the world believe is a power, an empire that pushes people around, we do it our way, we don't live up to our commitments to multilateral institutions."

==== Immigration ====
Hagel co-sponsored the Comprehensive Immigration Reform Act of 2006. He supported the Comprehensive Immigration Reform Act of 2007 and, with Senator Bob Menendez proposed an amendment to allow immigration authorities to consider family-unification petitions submitted by people for an additional two years, which would have allowed approximately estimated 833,000 additional individuals to seek permanent residency. The proposal received 51 votes but was defeated by a procedural maneuver. The bill failed to pass. Hagel voted in favor of the Secure Fence Act of 2006, which aimed to build a 700-mile (1,100 km) double fence along the Mexico–United States border and appropriated $1.2 billion for the fence and a systematic surveillance system.

=== Committee assignments ===
- Committee on Foreign Relations
  - Subcommittee on Near Eastern and South and Central Asian Affairs
  - Subcommittee on African Affairs
  - Subcommittee on East Asian and Pacific Affairs
  - Subcommittee on International Development and Foreign Assistance, Economic Affairs, and International Environmental Protection (Ranking Member)
- Committee on Banking, Housing, and Urban Affairs
  - Subcommittee on Securities, Insurance and Investment
  - Subcommittee on Financial Institutions (Ranking Member)
  - Subcommittee on Housing, Transportation, and Community Development
- Select Committee on Intelligence
- Committee on Rules and Administration

=== Criticism of Bush administration ===
On August 18, 2005, Hagel compared the Iraq War to Vietnam, and openly mocked Vice President Dick Cheney's assertion that the Iraqi insurgency was in its "last throes." In November 2005, Hagel defended his criticism of the Iraq war, stating "To question your government is not unpatriotic — to not question your government is unpatriotic." In December 2005, in reference to Bush, the Republican Party, and the Patriot Act, Hagel stated "I took an oath of office to the Constitution, I didn't take an oath of office to my party or my president."

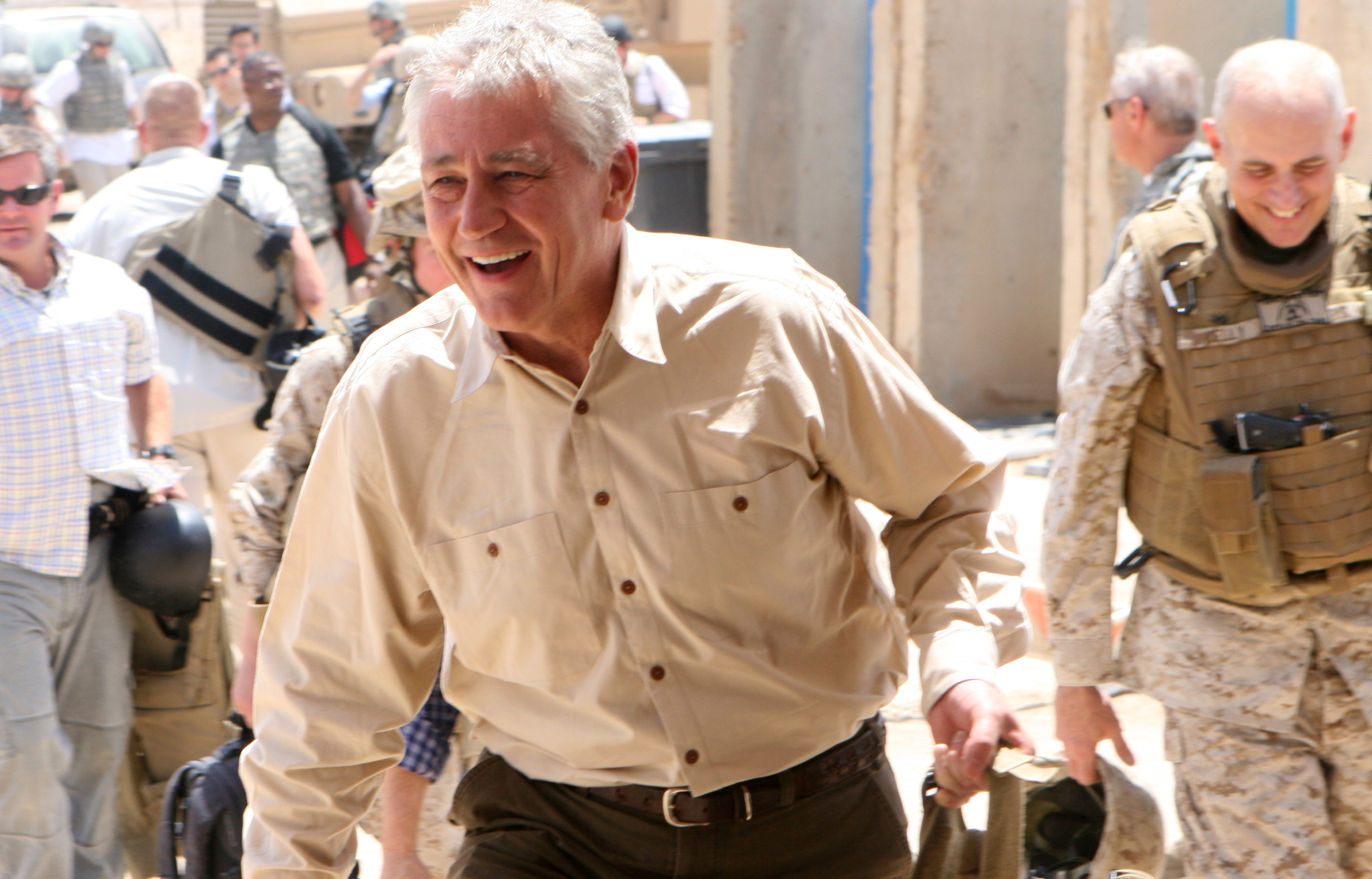
Senator Chuck Hagel arriving at Camp Ramadi, during a 2008 visit to U.S. Service members in Iraq

In January 2006, Hagel took issue with Karl Rove's statement that the Republican and Democratic worldviews were "post-9/11" and "pre-9/11", respectively. Hagel stated, "I didn't like what Mr. Rove said, because it frames terrorism and the issue of terrorism and everything that goes with it, whether it's the renewal of the Patriot Act or the NSA wiretapping, in a political context."

In July 2006, Hagel criticized the Bush administration on its handling of the 2006 Lebanon War, saying "The sickening slaughter on both sides must end and it must end now. President Bush must call for an immediate cease-fire. This madness must stop." He also said "Our relationship with Israel is special and historic... But it need not and cannot be at the expense of our Arab and Muslim relationships. That is an irresponsible and dangerous false choice."

Following heavy Republican losses in the 2006 midterm election, Hagel penned an editorial in The Washington Post highly critical of military strategies both employed and proposed for Iraq. He wrote that "There will be no victory or defeat for the United States in Iraq," and called for a "phased troop withdrawal." According to a SurveyUSA poll, in August 2006 Hagel had a 10% higher approval rating among Nebraska Democrats than Republicans.

In January 2007, Hagel openly criticized President Bush's plan to send an additional 20,000 troops to Iraq. He called it "the most dangerous foreign policy blunder in this country since Vietnam, if it's carried out." Together with Democrats Joe Biden and Carl Levin, he proposed a non-binding resolution to the Democratic-controlled Senate Foreign Relations Committee, which rejected Bush's policy as "not in the national interest" in a 12–9 vote. After an April 2007 visit to Iraq with U.S. congressman Joe Sestak (D-PA), Hagel stated his belief that the occupation of Iraq should not continue indefinitely and expressed his intention to cooperate with Senate Democrats in voting for a bill that would set a timeline to get out of Iraq.

In November 2007, he rated the Bush administration "the lowest in capacity, in capability, in policy, in consensus—almost every area" of any presidency in the last forty years.

=== 2008 presidential election ===
In the 2008 presidential election, Hagel was seen as a likely choice to hold a top cabinet position in a future John McCain or Barack Obama administration. In 2006, McCain told The New York Times that he would be "honored to have Chuck with me in any capacity. He'd make a great Secretary of State."

Hagel was rumored to be a possible running mate for vice president for then Senator Barack Obama, in his 2008 presidential campaign. On June 20, 2008, Hagel said he would consider running with Obama if offered the VP spot, though he added that he did not believe that Obama would pick him for the position. At the time he also was mentioned as a potential United States Secretary of Defense to succeed incumbent Robert Gates in the Obama administration. Hagel said that he would consider serving if asked.

Hagel and Senator John McCain were close friends until 2007 when they diverged regarding Iraq policy; Hagel did not endorse McCain for President in the 2008 Republican primaries or in the general election. Explaining his reason for not endorsing John McCain in the 2008 election, Hagel told The New Yorker, "In good conscience, I could not enthusiastically—honestly—go out and endorse him, when we so fundamentally disagree on the future course of our foreign policy and our role in the world." In August 2008, Hagel indicated that he would not endorse either candidate or get involved in their campaigns.

=== Retirement from U.S. Senate ===
During his first campaign, Hagel indicated that, were he to be elected, he would retire in 2008 after two terms in the Senate. In August 2004 Hagel acknowledged that he was considering a presidential campaign in 2008. In 2006 he cooperated with Charlyne Berens who wrote a biography titled Chuck Hagel: Moving Forward. On September 10, 2007, Hagel announced that he would retire and not seek a third term. Hagel also remains the last person to serve two full terms in Nebraska's Class 2 Senate seat. He also declined to run for president in 2008. He decided to go into academia.

== Hiatus from public service (2009–2013) ==
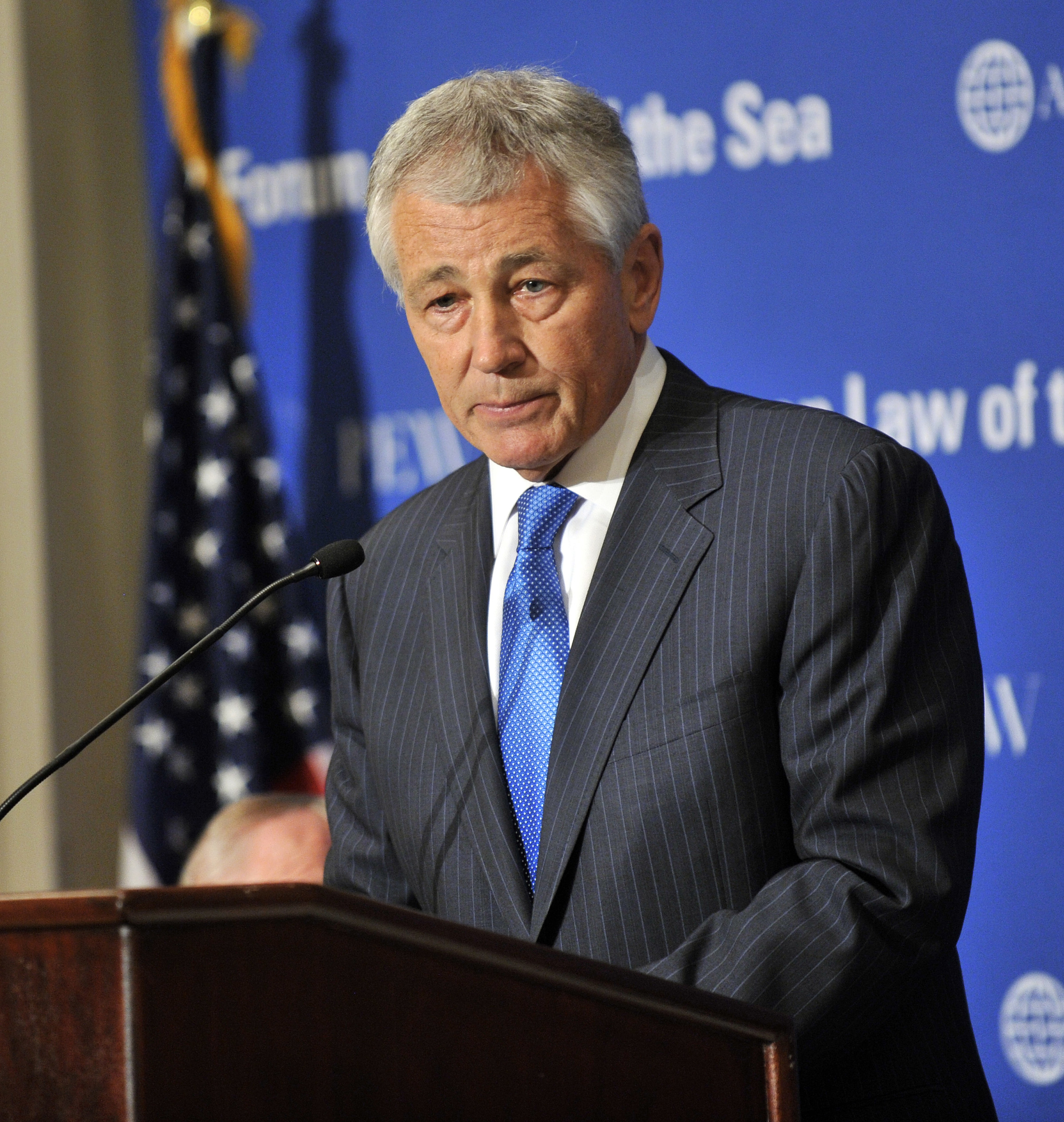
Hagel speaking at a forum for the Law of the Sea Convention in Washington, D.C., May 9, 2012.

=== America: Our Next Chapter ===
In Hagel's 2008 book, America: Our Next Chapter: Tough Questions, Straight Answers (with Peter Kaminsky), he suggests that the United States should adopt independent leadership and possibly another political party. He also believes that the Iraq War is one of the five biggest blunders in U.S. history. Hagel is critical of George W. Bush's foreign policy, calling it "reckless." He has been a major critic of the war since it started, and has stated that the United States should learn from its mistakes in the Vietnam War. He considered Bush's foreign policy a "ping pong game with American lives."

=== Service in academia and on boards of directors ===
Following Hagel's retirement from the Senate, in February 2009 he accepted a position as Distinguished Professor in National Governance at the Edmund A. Walsh School of Foreign Service at Georgetown University in Washington, D.C. He was chairman of the Atlantic Council, a foreign policy think tank; co-chairman of President Obama's Intelligence Advisory Board; a member of the Defense Department's Defense Policy Board Advisory Committee and the Energy Departments Blue Ribbon Commission on America's Nuclear Future; a member of The Washington Center's board of directors; and a member of the Public Broadcasting Service's board of directors. In the private sector, he served on the board of directors of Chevron Corporation, Deutsche Bank's Americas Advisory Board, and the advisory board of Corsair Capital, and was a director of the Zurich Holding Company of America and a senior advisor to McCarthy Capital Corporation. In October 2012, Defense Secretary Leon Panetta asked Hagel to chair an advisory committee for the Vietnam War 50th anniversary commemoration. While a senator, Hagel co-sponsored the bill creating the commemoration committee.

Hagel identifies with Ronald Reagan's nuclear disarmament policies and was an initial signatory to the Global Zero campaign which advocates the international elimination of nuclear weaponry. He also served on the board of the Ploughshares Fund, which pursues the elimination of weapons of mass destruction and seeks to prevent their use.

=== Endorsement of Senate candidates ===
In 2010, Hagel endorsed Democratic Pennsylvania congressman Joe Sestak in his run for the United States Senate. In 2012 he endorsed Democrat Bob Kerrey in the race for an open U.S. Senate seat in Nebraska.

== Secretary of Defense (2013–2015) ==
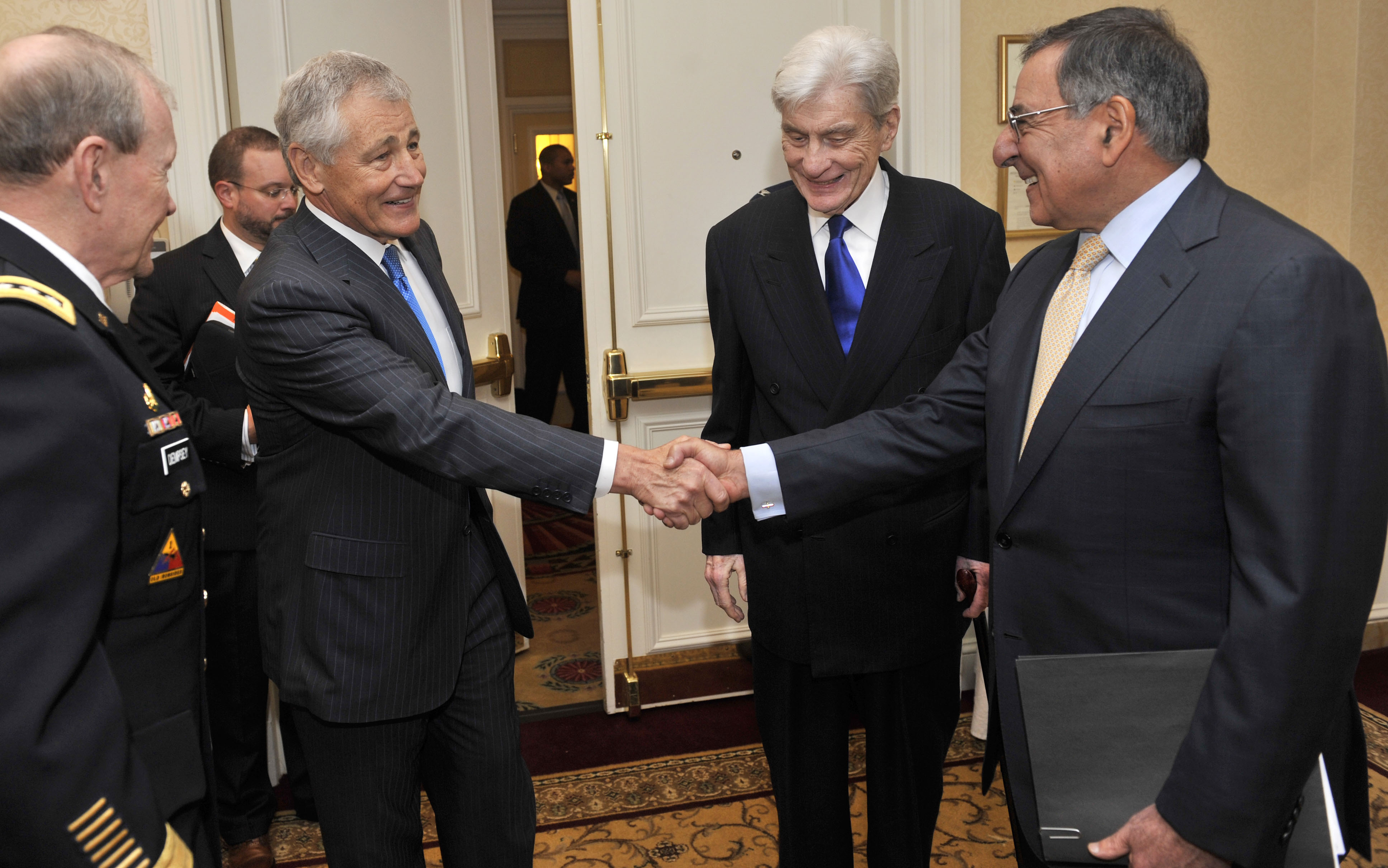
Hagel meeting with Secretary of Defense Leon Panetta, Chairman of the Joint Chiefs of Staff Martin Dempsey, and former Virginia Senator John Warner

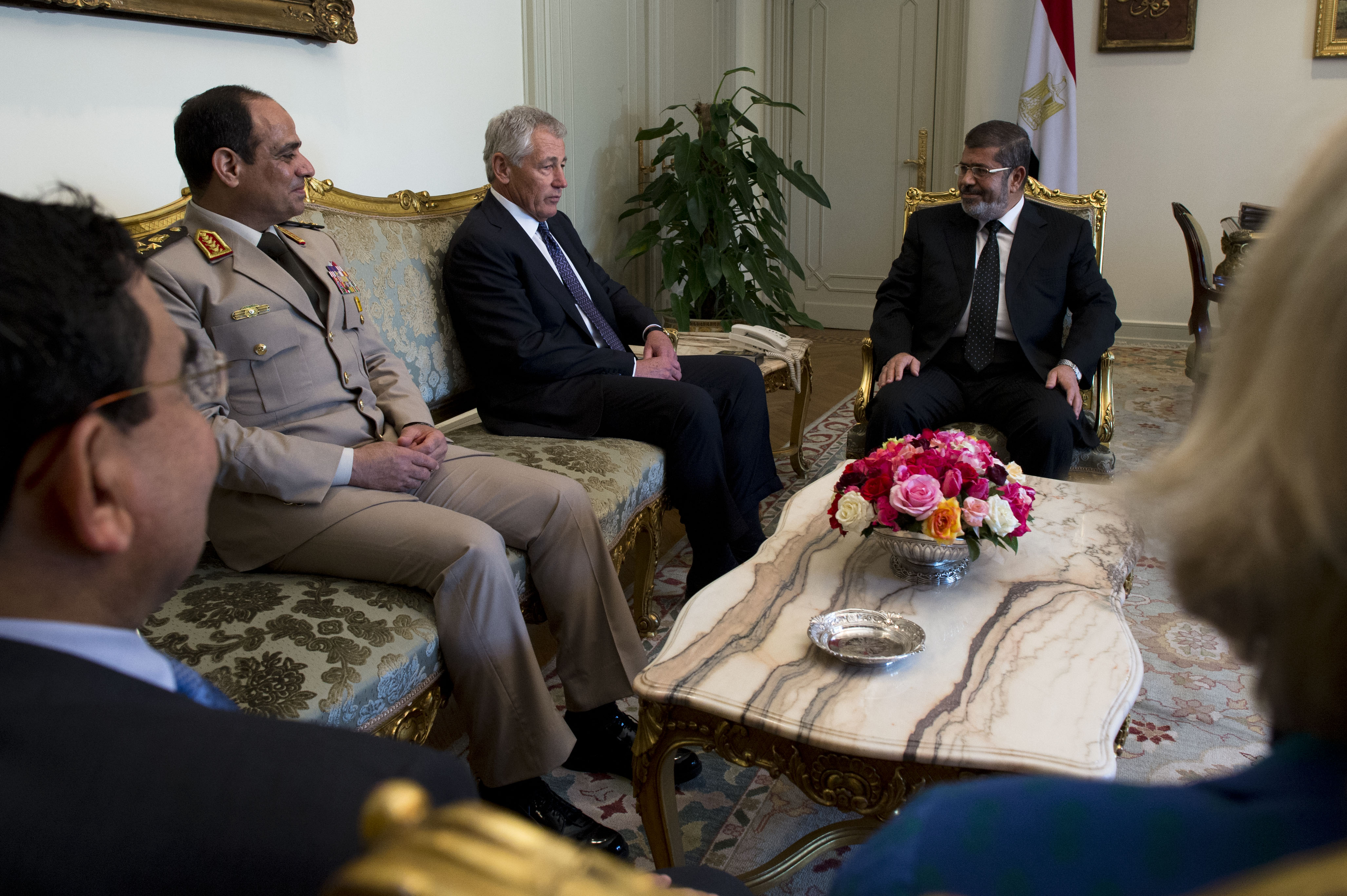
Hagel with Egyptian president Mohamed Morsi and General al-Sisi in Cairo, April 24, 2013

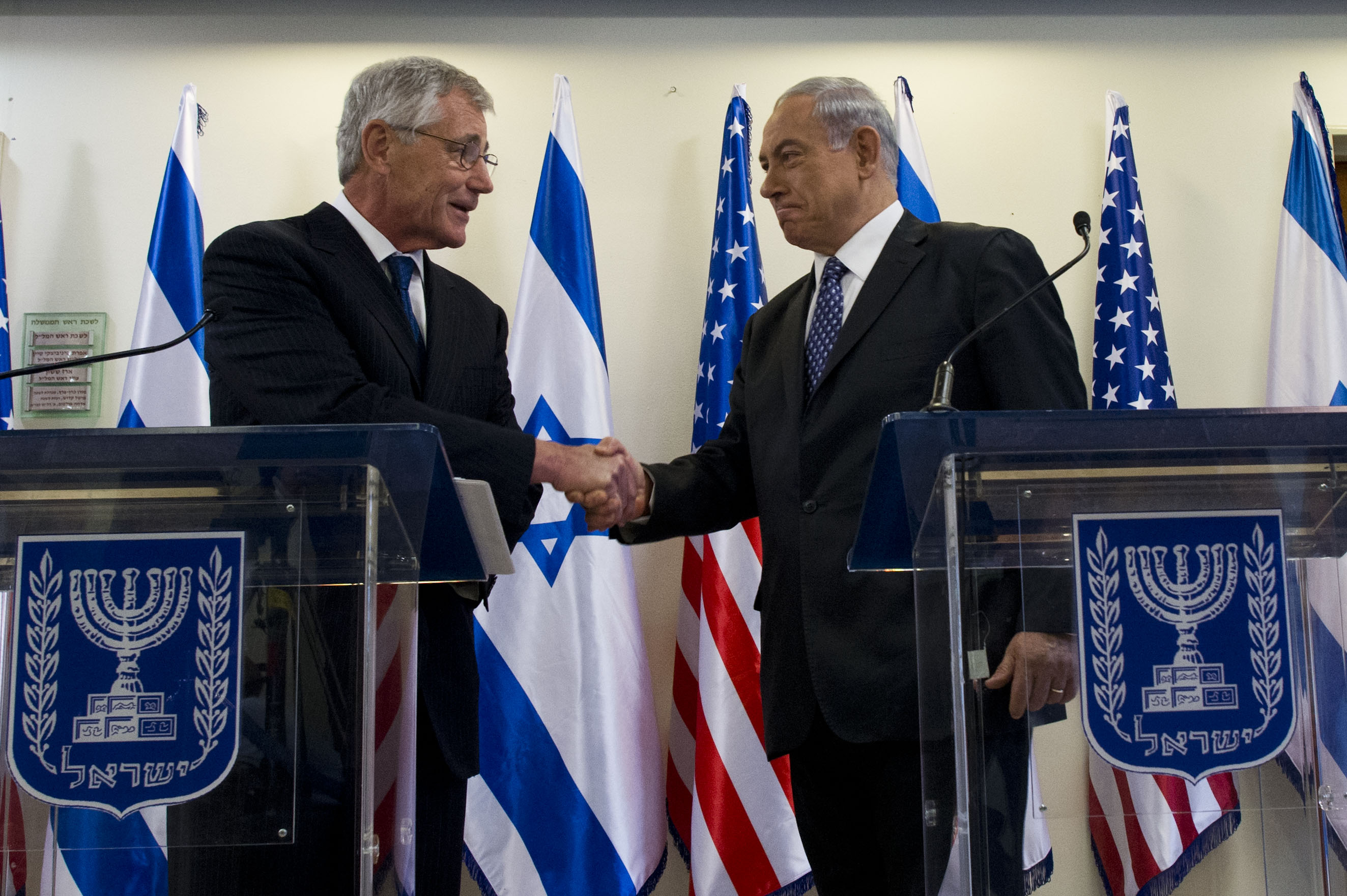
Hagel with Israeli prime minister Benjamin Netanyahu in Jerusalem, May 16, 2014

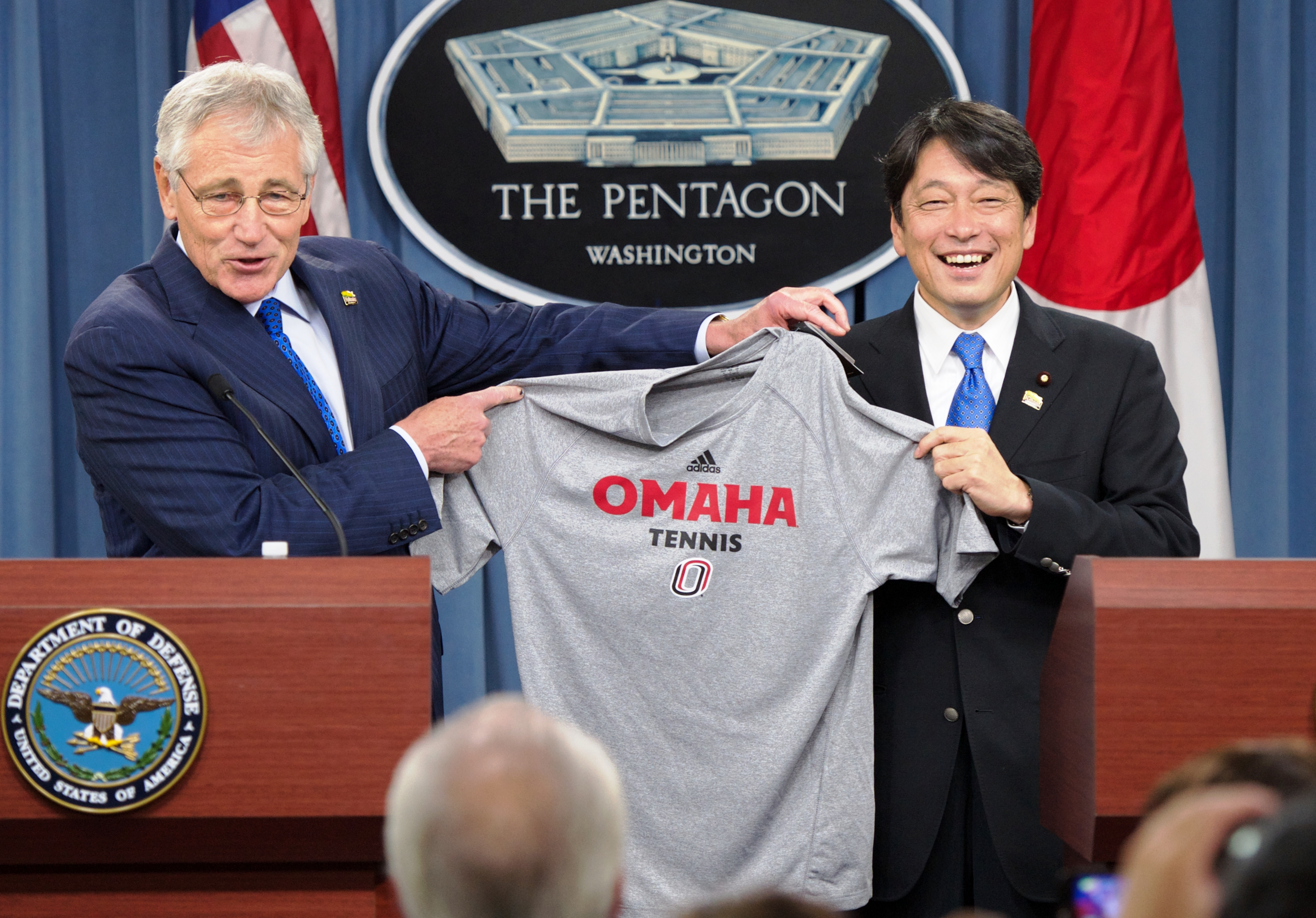
Secretary of Defense Chuck Hagel presents Japan's minister of defense Itsunori Onodera with a University of Nebraska Omaha tennis shirt at the joint press availability at the United States Department of Defense Washington, DC on July 11, 2014. DoD photo taken by Casper Manlangit (Released)

President Obama nominated Hagel to succeed Leon Panetta and serve as his second term Secretary of Defense on January 7, 2013. Hagel, who became, upon confirmation, the first former enlisted combat soldier to hold the office of Secretary of Defense, was interviewed by the Senate Armed Services Committee during a seven-and-a-half-hour hearing on January 31, 2013.

=== Nomination process ===
==== Criticism of the nomination ====
According to Jon Swaine writing in The Daily Telegraph, Hagel has been accused of having "views [that] verged on anti-Semitic" due to his stating in a 2006 interview with Aaron David Miller that "[t]he Jewish lobby intimidates a lot of people [on Capitol Hill]", and "I'm not an Israeli senator. I'm a United States senator." Hagel later clarified these remarks saying he was referring to the Israel lobby. Hagel also has been criticized by the American Jewish Committee for an incident in 1999 where he was the only senator not to sign an open letter to Russian president Boris Yeltsin threatening to cut aid to Russia if it did not take action against rising anti-Semitism in the country. However, Hagel's refusal to sign the letter was consistent with his policy of never signing letters to foreign heads of state. Hagel, instead, wrote to Bill Clinton on this issue, saying "Anti-Semitism or any form of religious persecution should never be tolerated."

Hagel was criticized by The Christian Science Monitor and many Republicans, including senator John McCain, for opposing some sanctions against Iran, and for calling for dialogue with Iran and Hamas.

Some of Hagel's policy positions became the subject of heated debate in the Senate, including support of defense cuts, opposition to preemptive action against Iran, and support of talks with Hamas and Hezbollah. However, U.S. News & World Report cited public opinion polls and foreign policy experts to suggest that Hagel's views were within the mainstream of American foreign policy thought. Opponents also complained of Hagel's 2011 call to have the Pentagon "pared down", saying that "[t]he Defense Department, I think in many ways, has been bloated."

The Human Rights Campaign criticized Hagel for having a "consistent anti-LGBT" voting record in the Senate and for opposing President Bill Clinton's nomination of James Hormel as the U.S. ambassador to Luxembourg, stating that Hormel was "openly, aggressively gay." The group demanded that Hagel apologize for this 1998 remark. The Log Cabin Republicans ran full-page newspaper ads opposing Hagel's nomination. Hagel apologized to Hormel in December 2012. On January 24, 2013, Senator Jeanne Shaheen stated that Hagel will oppose restrictions on LGBT military family benefits. Shortly thereafter, on February 13, 2013, the Senate's first openly LGBT member, Tammy Baldwin (D-WI) stated that after meeting with Hagel, she would support his nomination.

Republican senator Lindsey Graham of South Carolina predicted that Hagel would be "the most antagonistic Secretary of Defense toward the State of Israel in our nation's history" and called it an "in-your-face nomination."

The New York Times reported that the media campaign opposing Hagel's appointment was financed by new groups including a conservative group, Americans for a Strong Defense and a gay rights group, Use Your Mandate. The donors of these groups were mostly anonymous and running advertisements on issues raised by critics. The Times described the campaign as "unmatched in the annals of modern presidential cabinet appointments".

==== Support for the nomination ====
In December 2012, nine former United States ambassadors, including five former ambassadors to Israel, wrote a letter in support of nominating Hagel. Brent Scowcroft, Anthony Zinni and nine other retired senior military officers signed a separate letter of support. Robert Gates and Colin Powell also endorsed Hagel for the nomination, with Powell calling him "that kind of independent and bold leader who thinks in and out of the box" who can "deal with the strategic and resource challenges [the Department of Defense] will be facing over the next several years." Rabbi Aryeh Azriel, the senior rabbi at Temple Israel in Omaha, Nebraska since 1988, wrote in a CNN article that "[Hagel's] record shows strong support for Israel" and that Hagel understands "the Israeli people and their desire to live in peace and security." He added that "Recent efforts to smear Chuck ... ultimately that hurts the long-term security of the state of Israel."

Defenses of Hagel have included opinion pieces by writers Amy Davidson, Thomas Friedman, and Robert Wright, with Wright objecting to what he called "McCarthyite" smears against Hagel. Jeremy Ben-Ami, President of the liberal lobby group J Street, said: "The notion that Chuck Hagel is anti-Israel is ludicrous. The notion that he is anti-Semitic is slanderous." Harvard University Professor Stephen Walt, co-author of a 2007 book critical of the Israeli lobby wrote in Foreign Policy that "The real meaning of the Hagel affair is what it says about the climate inside Washington. Simply put, the question is whether supine and reflexive support for all things Israeli remains a prerequisite for important policy positions here in the Land of the Free."

Commentators at The American Conservative and Pat Buchanan endorsed Hagel. Hagel's nomination received support from Antiwar.com founder Justin Raimondo and the libertarian think tank Cato Institute; Justin Logan, director of foreign policy studies at the Cato Institute, expressed the hope that Hagel's confirmation might "loosen the neoconservative stranglehold on the GOP."

==== Senate hearing and votes ====
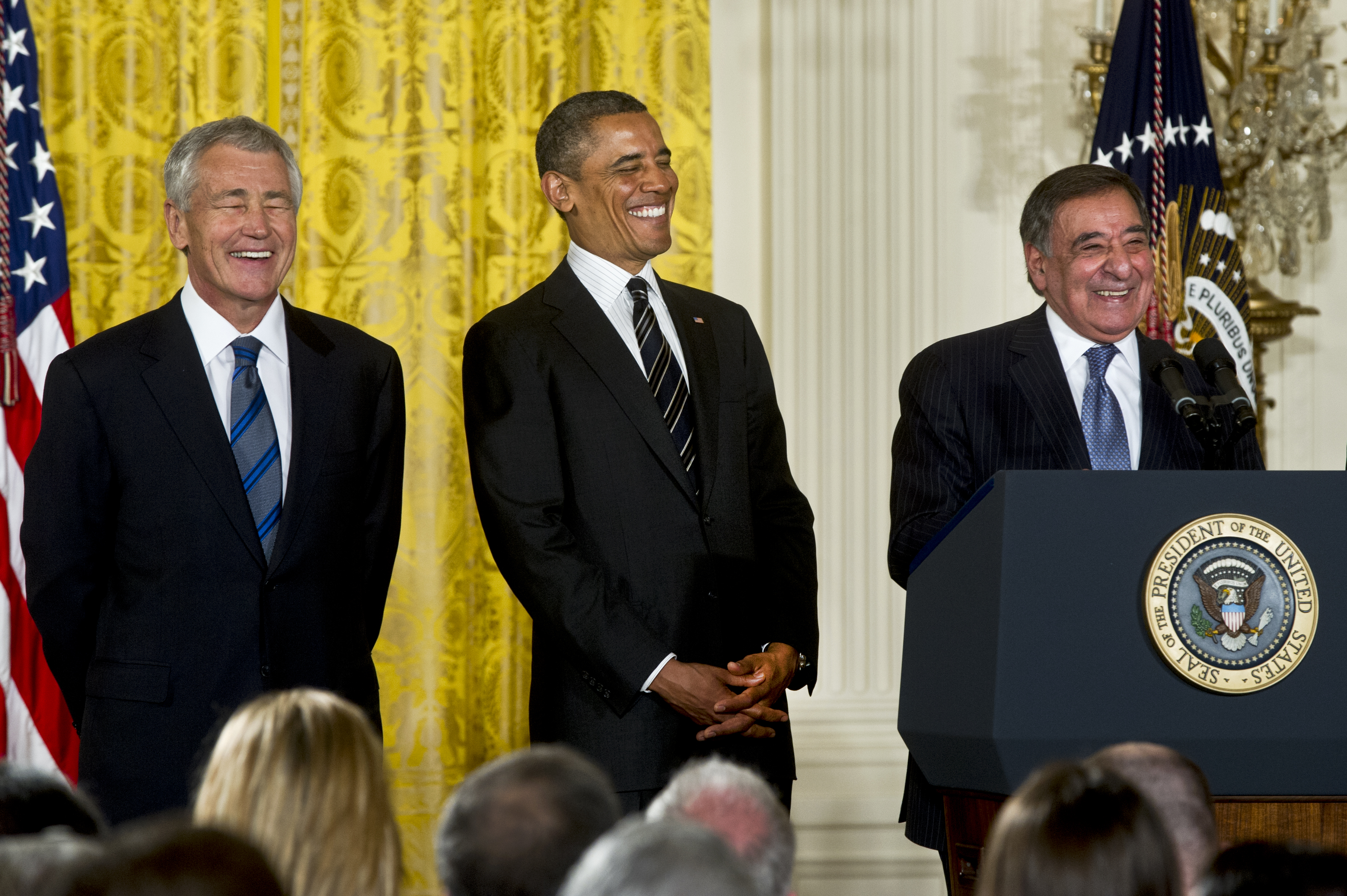
Leon Panetta with President Barack Obama, after announcing his nomination of Chuck Hagel as the next defense secretary at the White House, January 7, 2013.

During his Senate hearing opening statement Hagel said that he endorsed use of American military power, supported Israel and supported using special operations forces and unmanned combat aerial vehicles ("drones") on terrorist groups in Yemen, Somalia and North Africa. He stated "I believe, and always have, that America must engage—not retreat—in the world". During the hearing he explained his 2001 and 2002 votes against unilateral American sanctions on Iran as being for strategic reasons. He said he supported President Obama's drawing down troops in Afghanistan and said he would do "everything possible under current law" to support gay and women service members equal benefits and combat roles.

Hagel faced sharp questioning from Republicans. Senator John McCain berated him for refusing to give a yes or no answer to the question of whether the Iraq War troop surge of 2007 was a success. Senator Lindsey Graham demanded he "name one dumb thing we've been goaded into doing because of the pressure from the Israeli or Jewish lobby." Hagel stated "I've already said I regret referencing the Jewish lobby, I should have said, 'pro-Israel lobby. ... The use of 'intimidation'—I should have used 'influence.' I think that would have been more appropriate. I should not have said 'dumb' or 'stupid,' because I understand or appreciate there are other views on these things.". Senator Ted Cruz played video excerpts from a 2009 Al Jazeera interview and asserted that Hagel had agreed with a caller who suggested that Israel had committed war crimes. Hagel denied he agreed with that view. After the hearing, Cruz organized a letter from 25 Republican senators saying they would not vote until Hagel gave them copies of speeches given to organizations and told them the amount he was paid and whether the organizations received money from foreign sources. Lindsey Graham said they wanted to know if he spoke for any "anti-Israel" groups. Senate Committee chair Carl Levin said the demands were unprecedented, asking "for information no prior nominee has been asked for," and expressed confidence Hagel would be approved by the Senate.

==== Cloture and final vote ====
Despite the committee's February 12, 2013, 14-to-11 vote to approve Hagel, committee member James Inhofe vowed to use procedural tactics to delay a full Senate confirmation vote. Inhofe told the National Review "Each day that goes by will make it more difficult for Democrats who say they are pro-Israel to hold out." On February 14 Republicans refused to close debate on Hagel's nomination, which would require 60 votes, even though the nomination was assured the simple majority of votes needed to pass. Reasons given included a demand for more White House information about the 2012 Benghazi attack, remaining questions about Hagel's views on Iran and Israel, and assertions two weeks after the hearings was insufficient time. Senate Majority Leader Harry Reid said the Republicans were politically motivated and that the vote would proceed after the recess.

Senate Republicans successfully filibustered his nomination after a cloture vote failed 58–40 with one present and one not voting. This filibuster marked the first time a nominee for Secretary of Defense was successfully filibustered.

The Senate voted 71-27 for cloture on Hagel's nomination on February 26, 2013. Later that day the Senate voted to make Hagel the Secretary of Defense by a vote of 58–41.

==== Criticism of the process ====
The hearings were criticized in the media. In Time magazine Brandon Friedman presented a chart showing that Israel was mentioned 106 times while Afghanistan was mentioned only 24 times; nuclear-armed Pakistan was barely mentioned. Friedman asked if the Senate committee was more concerned with Hagel's "relationship with Israel than with the future of Afghanistan, Pakistan, and the fate of U.S. troops engaged in both locations." A Michael McGough Op-Ed in the Los Angeles Times was titled "Hagel hearings: Is Israel more important than Afghanistan?" Gene Healy in Reason called the hearings "farcical" and wrote there was "plenty of bloviating, grandstanding and browbeating—but, apparently, not enough time for serious deliberation over key policy questions facing any new Pentagon chief."

Mark Mardell, the BBC News North America editor, criticized the "whole process, which has been used not to examine a candidate's fitness for high office, but to underline the rather obvious fact that the Obama administration does not share the world view of Republican senators, and they don't like their former colleague joining it." Mardell noted the senators repeatedly "insisted he gave a simple 'yes' or 'no' to complex questions. These are old men who hold themselves in high regard, but seem to see serious examination of difficult problems as a personal affront. They desperately want to play 'gotcha', but haven't the self-restraint to design effective questions." Mardell called Senator Hagel "equally unimpressive, almost unprepared, for a level of hostility that had been signalled long in advance. Neither smart, nor humble, his tactic seemed to be a kind of bumbling blandness." According to Mardell, only Cruz was effective and well-prepared, as "he ripped into the nominee with all the skill honed as a Texas solicitor general."

=== Tenure ===
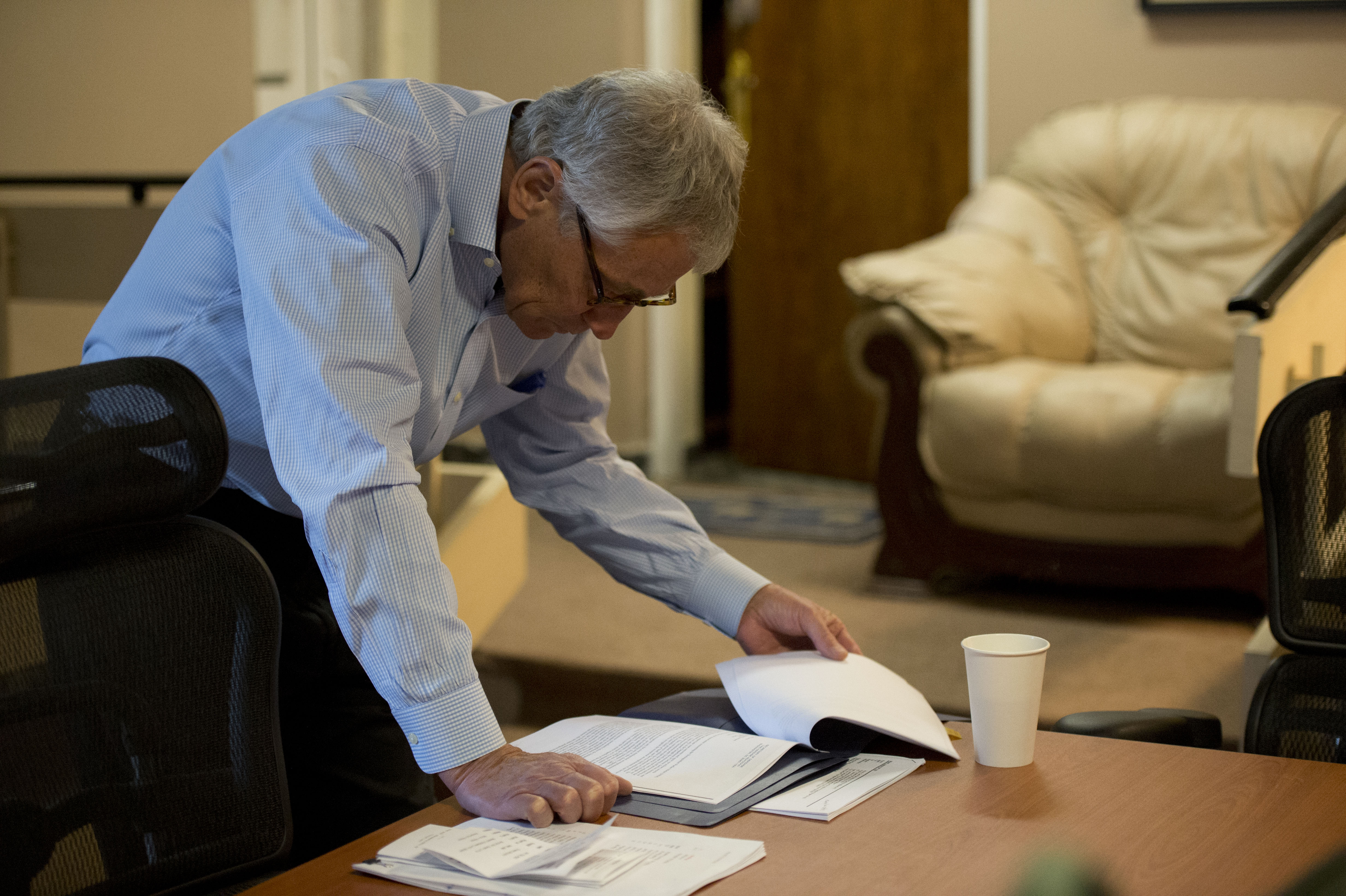
Hagel starts his day reading newspaper excerpts in the Early Bird, (The U.S. Department of Defense early morning newspaper.) in Kabul, Afghanistan, March 9, 2013

Hagel was sworn in on February 27, 2013, taking over from Leon Panetta.

In May 2013, during a visit to Asian countries whose "main doubt" was American staying power in the region, Hagel called the decline of American military power a "good thing", because it forced American allies to share responsibilities.

On July 31, 2013, Hagel announced the results of his Strategic Choices and Management Review, undertaken in response to the budget sequestration in 2013. One of the options he highlighted was to reduce the navy's aircraft carrier groups down from 11 to as little as eight.

On August 27, 2013, Hagel told the BBC that the United States was ready to launch a strike against Syria if given the orders.

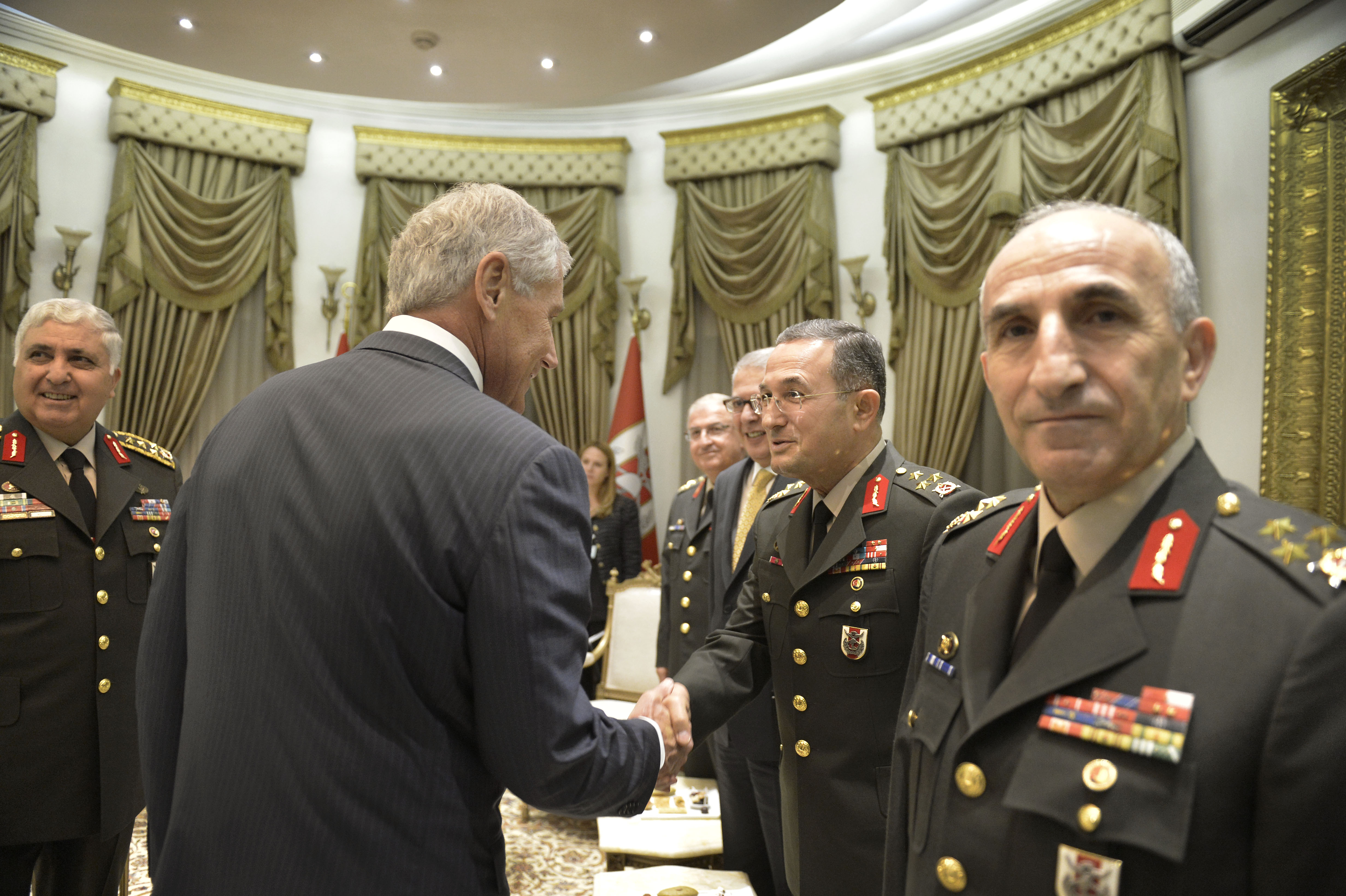
Hagel shakes hands with Turkish General Erdal Öztürk. Öztürk was later arrested in connection with the 2016 Turkish coup d'état attempt.

Hagel has pushed National Guard leadership to provide benefits for same-sex domestic partnerships, as directed by the Department of Defense.

Speaking at the Halifax International Security Forum in November 2013, Hagel announced the Pentagon's new Arctic strategy emphasizing the commitment of the United States to "detect, deter, prevent and defeat threats to the United States, and continue to exercise US sovereignty in and around Alaska". He also called for more international cooperation to protect the Arctic's environment and to keep the region "peaceful, stable and free of conflict".

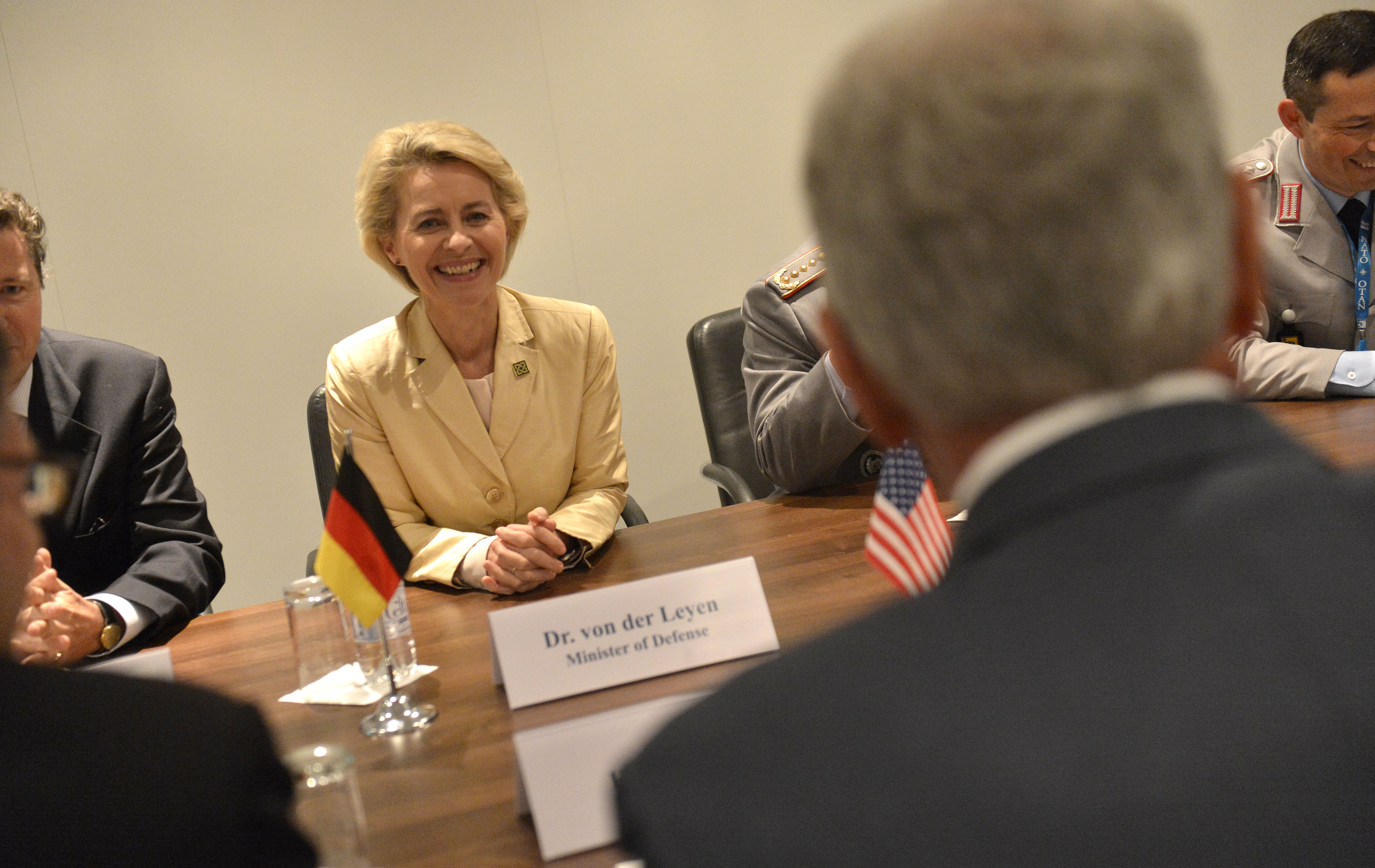
Chuck Hagel and Ursula von der Leyen at the September 2014 NATO summit in Newport, Wales

In December 2013, after the suspension of an Association Agreement with the EU by the Ukrainian Government of President Viktor Yanukovych in November 2013 had led to massive protests, Hagel in a phone call warned the Ukrainian Minister of Defense Pavlo Lebedyev "not to use the armed forces of Ukraine against the civilian population in any fashion". After Yanukovych's impeachment and the beginning of the Crimean crisis in February 2014, Hagel warned Russia against military maneuvers "that could be misinterpreted, or lead to miscalculation during a very delicate time". In several phone calls with the Russian Minister of Defense Sergey Shoygu Hagel expressed deep concerns about Russian military activities near the Ukrainian border and called for an end of any "destabilizing influence inside Ukraine". He was assured by Shoygu that the Russian army would not invade Ukraine. Speaking in April 2023, Hagel said that unfortunately in 2014 the Ukrainian armed forces were in no condition to receive advanced weaponry in order to reverse the course of events.

In May 2014, speaking at the Wilson Center on the future of NATO, Hagel focused on the alliance's imbalance in defense spending and called for "renewed financial commitments from all NATO members". According to Hagel, the alliance "should expect Russia to test our alliance's purpose, stamina and commitment":

Since the end of the Cold War, America’s military spending has become increasingly disproportionate within the Alliance. Today, America’s GDP is smaller than the combined GDPs of our 27 NATO Allies, but America’s defense spending is three times our Allies’ combined defense spending. Over time, this lopsided burden threatens NATO’s integrity, cohesion, and capability – and, ultimately, both European and transatlantic security. Many of NATO’s smaller members have pledged to increase their defense investment.. but the Alliance cannot afford for Europe’s larger economies and most militarily capable Allies not to do the same, particularly as transatlantic economies grow stronger. We must see renewed financial commitments from all NATO members.

Hagel was not insensitive to the European dependence on Russian natural gas and consequent exposure to "Russia’s coercive energy policies". In fact he saw even then an opportunity for North American producers. NATO's European allies were "positioned" to reduce their natural gas imports from Russia by more than 25% and the U.S. Department of Energy had conditionally approved export permits for American liquefied natural gas that add up to more than half of Europe's gas imports from Russia.

Hagel was instrumental in formulating the 2014 NATO Wales summit declaration, in which the Allies agreed to increase (over a period of ten years) their defence expenditures. The target of 2% GDP, formulated as a trial balloon at the 2006 NATO Riga summit by then-NATO ambassador Victoria Nuland, had been scorned by most in Europe, for example Belgium, Canada, Denmark, Germany and the Netherlands. Only three alliance members did so in 2014. In light of the Russo-Ukrainian war, the issue had assumed increased political relevance.

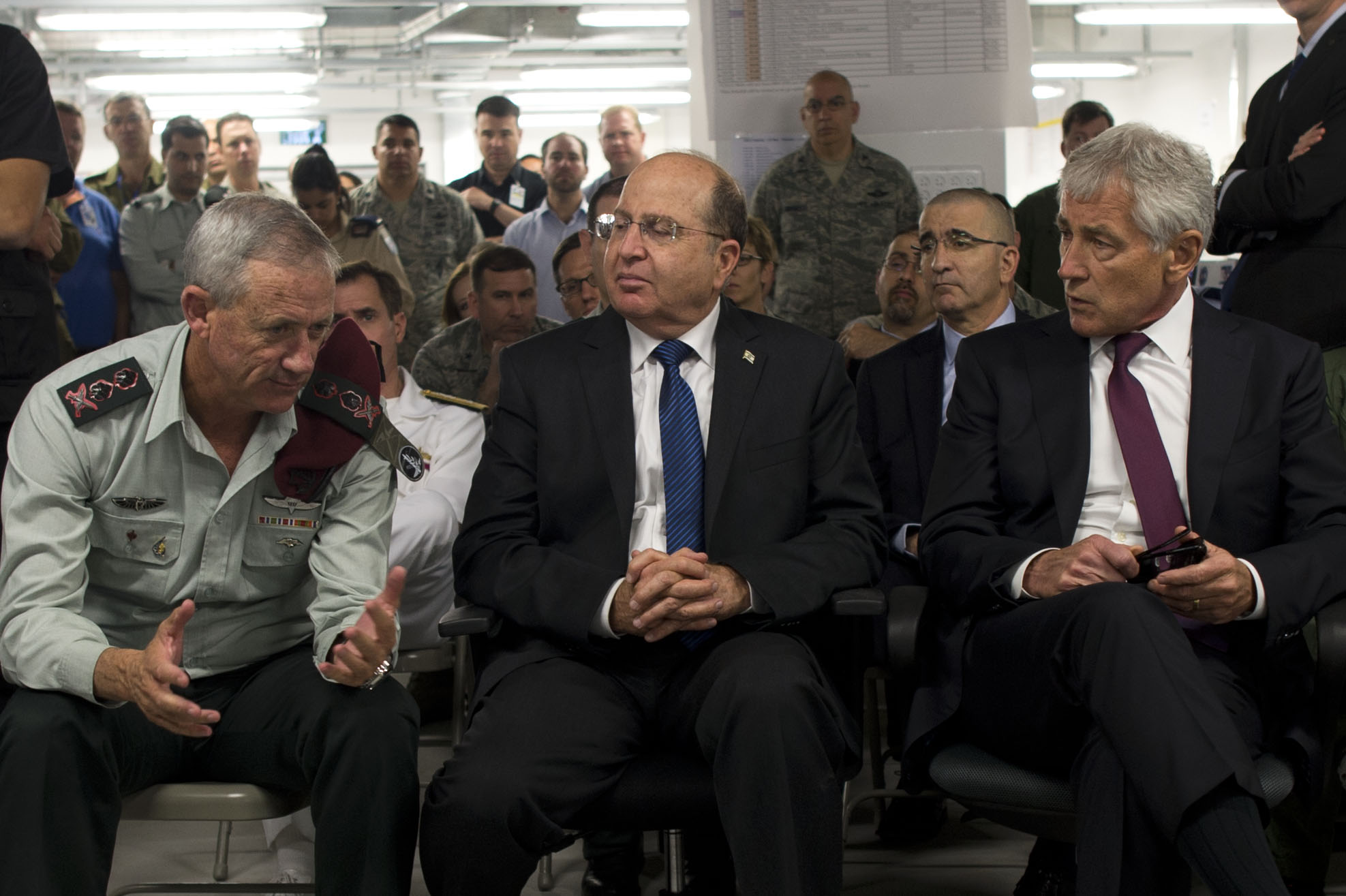
Chuck Hagel with IDF General Benny Gantz and Moshe Ya'alon

During his time as Secretary of Defense, he was known for the close relationship he formed with Israeli defense officials, in particular Moshe Ya'alon, who described Hagel as a 'true friend'. Even as his relations with the White House deteriorated, Hagel was positively viewed by Israeli military officials, which was seen as a stark contrast to the way Hagel was perceived by some in Washington prior to his appointment.

=== Resignation ===
On November 24, 2014, The New York Times reported that Hagel would be resigning from his position as secretary of defense under pressure from the Obama administration, in particular because of a dispute with NSA advisor Susan E. Rice over Syria policy. The administration during Hagel's term had struggled to articulate a strategy to defeat ISIL in both Iraq and Syria. Later that day, President Obama announced Hagel's resignation and thanked him for his service. Hagel said in a statement, "You should know I did not make this decision lightly. But after much discussion, the President and I agreed that now was the right time for new leadership here at the Pentagon."

Hagel did not deny rumors that Obama asked for his resignation, but he explicitly contended that it was a "mutual decision" between him and President Obama. Senator John McCain offered his own insight: Hagel was frustrated with the White House decision-making process, national security policy, and "excessive micromanagement" within the White House. In December 2015, during an interview with Foreign Policy, Hagel stated he was "backstabbed" and accused Obama administration officials of making anonymous comments after his resignation in an effort to destroy his reputation.

Hagel continued in post until the confirmation of his successor, Ash Carter, in February 2015.

== Retirement ==
Since 2018, both Hagel and the University of Nebraska Omaha have held the Chuck Hagel Symposium in Public Service. Also held with the University of Nebraska Omaha, since 2019 Hagel has participated in the "Chuck Hagel Forum in Global Leadership", a forum that explores current global issues, with the inaugural forum hosting both Hagel and former Vice President Joe Biden. The forum is hosted in partnership with the Atlantic Council.

In 2019 Hagel funded the annual Hagel Lecture at the University of Chicago Project for Security and Threats, and on 17 October 2019 gave a keynote speech at the International Tribunal for the Law of the Sea in Hamburg to address: "How healthy is the ocean’s constitution? 25 Years of the United Nations Convention on the Law of the Sea".

=== 2020 presidential election ===
In 2020, Hagel, along with over 130 other former Republican national security officials, signed a statement that asserted that President Trump was unfit to serve another term, and "To that end, we are firmly convinced that it is in the best interest of our nation that Vice President Joe Biden be elected as the next President of the United States, and we will vote for him."

Hagel, along with more than 100 Republican former national security officials, signed a letter in November 2020 that stated that the delay of the presidential transition imperiled the security of the nation. The 9/11 Commission finding that the shortened transition to the administration of George W. Bush during the disputed 2000 presidential election "hampered the new administration in identifying, recruiting, clearing, and obtaining Senate confirmation of key appointees" was mentioned in the statement.

Hagel, along with all other former secretaries of defense, nine in total, published a Washington Post op-ed piece in January 2021 telling President Trump not to involve the military in determining the outcome of the 2020 elections.

== Awards and honors ==
In 2001, Hagel was awarded the Horatio Alger Award for Distinguished Americans. He was also granted the title of Nebraska Admiral by Nebraska's governor, an honorary title, considering Nebraska is a landlocked state.

On June 7, 2001, Hagel gave the commencement address for North Central College and was given an honorary L.L.D. He was the keynote speaker at the College of William & Mary's Charter Day in 2007, at which he was awarded an honorary degree of Public Service. On March 3, 2008, he led a town meeting on domestic and foreign policy issues at the University of Maryland, at which the Center for American Politics and Citizenship (CAPC) gave him the Millard Tydings Award for Courage and Leadership in American Politics. Hagel served as the 2010 Clifford P. Case Professor of Public Affairs at Rutgers University's Eagleton Institute of Politics, speaking at public programs in New Brunswick and Newark, New Jersey.

Hagel was also the featured speaker at the 2015 Annual Meeting of the American Chemistry Council at Colorado Springs.

== Personal life ==
Hagel has two younger brothers: Thomas, a professor at the University of Dayton School of Law, and Michael, an artist resident in Omaha, Nebraska. Hagel's third brother, James, died in an automobile accident at the age of 16. Hagel was raised in the Roman Catholic faith, but converted to the Episcopal Church.

In 1979, Hagel married Patricia Lloyd. The couple separated in 1981 and divorced a year later. He married his second wife, Lilibet Ziller, in April 1985. The couple have two children together.

While a senator, Hagel had a tradition of wearing costumes to work on Halloween, usually masquerading as one of his colleagues or other notable political figures, including Joe Biden, John McCain, Colin Powell, and Pat Roberts in past years. He gave back a portion of his salary for the 2013 fiscal year in solidarity with his department's workers who were facing 14 days of furloughs.

Hagel is a member of the ReFormers Caucus of Issue One. In October 2022, Hagel joined Issue One's Council for Responsible Social Media project to address the negative mental, civic, and public health impacts of social media in the United States co-chaired by former House Democratic Caucus Leader Dick Gephardt and former Massachusetts Lieutenant Governor Kerry Healey.

== Electoral history ==
=== 1996 ===
Republican United States Senatorial Primary Election in Nebraska, 1996
Party	Candidate	Votes	%
Republican	Chuck Hagel	112,953	62.24
Republican	Don Stenberg	67,974	37.46
Republican	Write-ins	544	0.30
Total votes		181,471	100.00

United States Senate election in Nebraska, 1996
Party	Candidate	Votes	%	±%
Republican	Chuck Hagel	379,933	56.14%	+15.21%
Democratic	Ben Nelson	281,904	41.65%	−17.25%
Libertarian	John DeCamp	9,483	1.40%	
Natural Law	Bill Dunn	4,806	0.71%	
Write-ins		663	0.10%	
Majority		98,029	14.48%	−3.49%
Turnout		676,958		
Republican gain from Democratic		Swing		

=== 2002 ===
Republican United States Senatorial Primary Election in Nebraska, 2002
Party	Candidate	Votes	%
Republican	Chuck Hagel (inc.)	144,160	100.00
Total votes		144,160	100.00

2002 United States Senate election in Nebraska
Party	Candidate	Votes	%	±%
Republican	Chuck Hagel (inc.)	397,438	82.76%	+25.36%
Democratic	Charlie A. Matulka	70,290	14.64%	−27.96%
Libertarian	John J. Graziano	7,423	1.55%	
Independent	Phil Chase	5,066	1.05%	
Majority		327,148	68.13%	+53.31%
Turnout		480,217		
Republican hold		Swing		

Party political offices
Preceded by Hal Daub	Republican nominee for U.S. Senator from Nebraska (Class 2); 1996, 2002	Succeeded by Mike Johanns
U.S. Senate
Preceded by James Exon	U.S. Senator (Class 2) from Nebraska; 1997–2009; Served alongside: Bob Kerrey, Ben Nelson	Succeeded by Mike Johanns
Preceded by Jim Leach	Chair of the Joint China Commission; 2005–2007	Succeeded by Sandy Levin
Non-profit organization positions
Preceded by Jim Jones	Chair of the Atlantic Council; 2009–2013	Succeeded by Brent Scowcroft; Acting
Government offices
Preceded by Steve Friedman	Chair of the President's Intelligence Advisory Board; 2009–2013; Served alongside: David Boren	Vacant Title next held by Shirley Jackson; Jami Miscik
Preceded by Steve Friedman	Chair of the Intelligence Oversight Board; 2009–2013	Succeeded by Dan Meltzer
Political offices
Preceded by Leon Panetta	United States Secretary of Defense; 2013–2015	Succeeded by Ash Carter
U.S. order of precedence (ceremonial)
Preceded by Leon Panetta as Former U.S. Cabinet Member	Order of precedence of the United States as Former U.S. Cabinet Member	Succeeded by Jack Lew as Former U.S. Cabinet Member
