= Goyette =

Goyette is a French Canadian surname that may refer to

- Alex Goyette (born 1988), American film director, writer, producer, actor, and YouTube personality
- Charles Goyette, American radio host
- Cynthia Goyette (born 1946), American swimmer
- Danielle Goyette (born 1966), Canadian ice hockey player
- Desirée Goyette (born 1956), American singer, composer, lyricist and voice-over artist
- Louis Béland-Goyette (born 1995), Canadian association football player
- Odilon Goyette (1842–1921), Canadian farmer and political figure
- Phil Goyette (1933–2026), Canadian ice hockey center
- Sophie Goyette, Canadian film director and screenwriter
- Susan Goyette (born 1964), Canadian poet and novelist
