= Matulka =

Matulka is a surname of Czech origin. People with that name include:

== People ==
- Charlie Matulka, Democratic candidate for the United States Senate election in Nebraska, 2002
- Dalibor Matulka (b.1953), Czech politician
- Jan Matulka (1890–1972), painter
- Alvydas Matulka (1955–1991), victim of the January Events in Lithuania

== Places ==
- Matulka Creek, watercourse in British Columbia
- Matulka Dam, dam in Phillips County, Montana
