= Justin Raimondo =

American journalist (1951–2019)

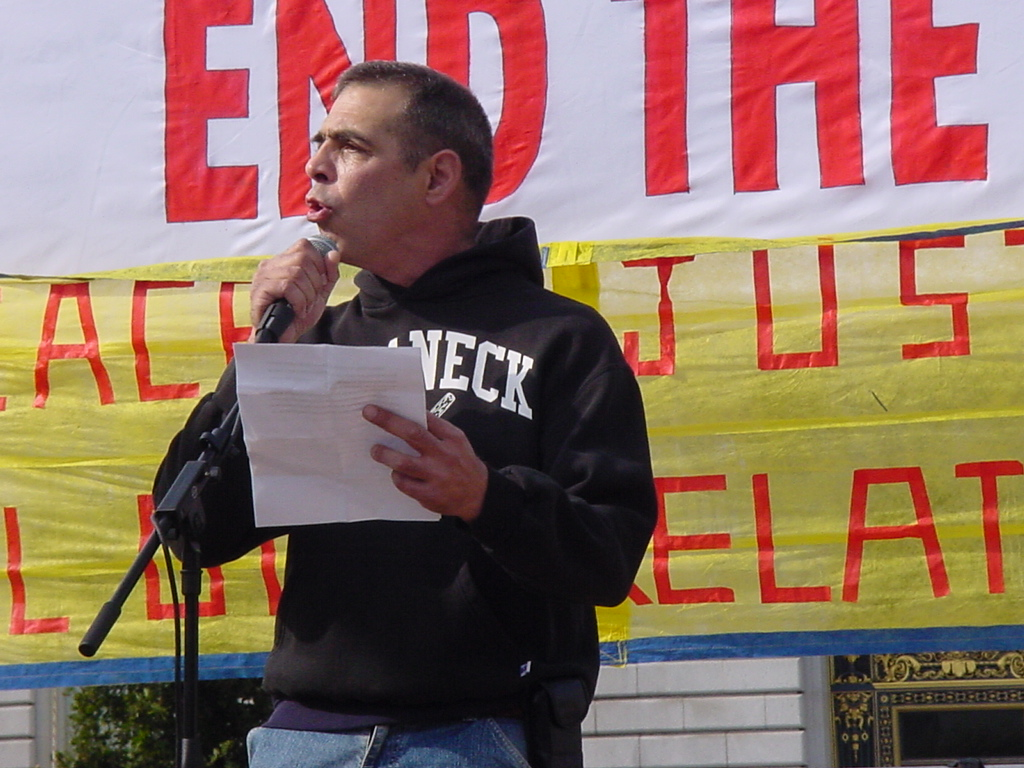
- Justin Raimondo
- Born: Dennis Raimondo; November 18, 1951; White Plains, New York, U.S.
- Died: June 27, 2019 (aged 67); Sebastopol, California, U.S.
- Occupations: Journalist, author, writer
- Spouse: Yoshinori Abe

Justin Raimondo (born Dennis Raimondo; November 18, 1951 – June 27, 2019) was an American author and the editorial director of Antiwar.com. He described himself as a "conservative-paleo-libertarian."

== Early life ==
Born in White Plains, New York, Raimondo moved with his family to Yorktown Heights, New York when he was very young. Raimondo described himself as a "bad kid"; to deter himself from this path he spent one year at a Jesuit-run school in upstate New York.

Around this time he took an interest in Ayn Rand's philosophy of Objectivism. Later he joined Young Americans for Freedom. In the 1970s, he became active in the Libertarian Party. He "joined the party in 1974, and was active in Roger MacBride's 1976 presidential campaign, the LP's second White House bid." He came to the defense of the White Night riots, which followed the manslaughter conviction of Dan White for the deaths of San Francisco supervisor Harvey Milk and Mayor George Moscone.

In 1983, after a schism in the Libertarian Party, Raimondo left the party and attempted to organize a libertarian faction in the Republican Party known as the Libertarian Republican Organizing Committee. After 1989, Raimondo again began working with Rothbard in the anti-war, paleoconservative John Randolph Club, part of the Rockford Institute.

== Career ==
=== Early activism ===
In 1980, Raimondo ran for public office for the first time. Running as a Libertarian candidate for the 16th district seat in the California State Assembly, Raimondo received 4,730 votes or 7.7% of the vote. In 1982, Raimondo ran for California's 5th district seat in the United States House of Representatives as a Libertarian, against Democratic incumbent Phillip Burton and Republican challenger Milton Marks. He received 14.2% of the vote.

In the 1996 U.S. congressional elections, Raimondo ran as a Republican candidate in California's 8th district against Nancy Pelosi. While he championed conservative and libertarian causes in general, the main emphasis of his campaign was his opposition to the deployment of U.S. troops in the Balkans and, in particular, Pelosi's vote to that effect. Raimondo received 25,739 votes for 12.4 percent of the vote while Pelosi got 84.3 percent.

During the 1992, 1996, and 2000 presidential elections, Raimondo supported the campaigns of Pat Buchanan, both as a Republican and in the Reform Party. As he was an out gay man, his support of the social conservative Buchanan attracted considerable attention. The idea he "wants to round us all up and send us to concentration camps is just a bunch of crap. It's a lie and a smear. He welcomes gay workers in his campaign. He does not think that homosexuality is all that great a thing. But I don't need his approval. Why does any gay person need anyone's benediction?"

In 1994, Raimondo was the San Francisco coordinator for the "Save our State" Proposition 187, which would have barred taxpayer funding of non-emergency services to illegal aliens in California. The measure was passed by California voters, but was later stayed by a federal court.

=== Antiwar.com and later activities ===
Raimondo and Eric Garris launched Antiwar.com in 1995. In 1999, during the Clinton administration's military intervention in the Kosovo war, the site became a full-time effort, providing a platform for the pair's opposition to foreign intervention. Raimondo was a vocal critic of the invasion of Iraq in 2003 and the ongoing occupation.

In the 2004 presidential election, he wrote approvingly of candidate Ralph Nader in an article published in The American Conservative. "Nader’s distrust of bigness, either corporate or governmental, his fear of centralized power, his sharp critique of the managerial-bureaucratic mentality, all recall the distinctively American tradition of individualist populism", he wrote.

Raimondo wrote positively about Ron Paul's 2008 presidential campaign, but expressed support for Dennis Kucinich. Unlike Ron Paul and his son, Rand, however, Raimondo supported abortion: "The libertarian position is unequivocal: the mother has the absolute right to abortion, period." He was critical of Barack Obama's Cabinet choices as President along with the President himself. However, when Obama nominated former Nebraska U.S. Senator Chuck Hagel for U.S. Secretary of Defense to succeed Leon Panetta, Raimondo came out in support for Hagel.

In 2016, he voted for Donald Trump on the basis of his foreign policy.

== Opinions ==
Justin Raimondo: Against the War Machine
Jeff Deist and Justin Raimondo discuss the early history of the modern libertarian movement, Justin's time working with Murray Rothbard on libertarian strategy, and the chances for developing a broad new anti-war coalition.

=== Major ideas and recurring themes ===
Raimondo argued in a 2003 Antiwar.com column that Israel exerts a dominant force in the formulation of American foreign policy. Raimondo also believed that the United States was led into World War II through lies by President Franklin D. Roosevelt and that the U.S. deliberately provoked a war with Japan through economic sanctions. Raimondo's views were compared by Christopher Hitchens to those of Charles Lindbergh, whom Raimondo once described as an "American hero sprung from the heartland." Raimondo also wrote that Israeli intelligence operating in the U.S. had advance knowledge of the September 11, 2001 attacks.

Raimondo believed that the government should refrain from adopting laws that would prohibit discrimination against homosexuals. "I think gays should have the right to discriminate against straight people if they want", he said in 2003. He also opposed the legal recognition of same-sex marriage and instead favored marriage privatization. Raimondo debated the issue of same-sex marriage with journalist Jonathan Rauch, who supports it. He also argued that after years of persecution by the state, LGBT rights activists sought to "use the battering ram of government power" to actively intervene on behalf of homosexuals.

=== Religious views ===
Though raised a Catholic, Raimondo described himself as "not a believer." Raimondo further described his early interactions with the Catholic Church and a local Jesuit seminary in Yorktown Heights as being influential in his development, despite rejecting the notion of God. He described being "taken with their engagement with ideas" and discussions of philosophy, which he was lacking in traditional schools or from classmates at the time.

== Death ==
Raimondo died of stage IV lung cancer on June 27, 2019, in Sebastopol, California. He was survived by his husband, Yoshinori Abe, and two sisters.

== See also ==
- List of peace activists

== Bibliography ==
Articles

In addition to his thrice-weekly column for Antiwar.com, Raimondo was a regular contributor to The American Conservative and Chronicles magazine. He formerly wrote twice-monthly columns for Taki's Top Drawer, but ceased in 2009.

Books

- Reclaiming the American Right: The Lost Legacy of the Conservative Movement. Center for Libertarian Studies, 1993. Reissued by Intercollegiate Studies Institute in 2008 with new introduction by George W. Carey. ISBN 978-1933859606.
- Into the Bosnian Quagmire: The Case Against U.S. Intervention in the Balkans. Burlingame, CA: America First Books-America First Political Action Committee, 1996. ISBN 978-1883959012.
- Colin Powell and the Power Elite. Burlingame, CA: America First Books-America First Political Action Committee, 1996. ISBN 1883959039.
- An Enemy of the State: The Life of Murray N. Rothbard. Amherst, NY: Prometheus Books, 2000. ISBN 978-1615922390.
- The Terror Enigma: 9/11 and the Israeli Connection. iUniverse, November 2003. ISBN 0595296823.

Book contributions

- "Gays and Lesbians Should Not be Given Special Rights". Homosexuality, edited by Helen Cothran. San Diego: Greenhaven Press, 2003, pp. 100–103. ISBN 978-0737711820.
- "The United States Should Not Intervene in Darfur". Human Rights. Detroit: Greenhaven Press, 2008, pp. 185–192. ISBN 978-0737737455.
- "America is Losing the War on Terror". War. Detroit: Greenhaven Press, 2014, pp. 135–141. ISBN 978-0737769715.
