= Recarving Rushmore =

2009 non-fiction book

- Author: Ivan Eland
- Language: English
- Subject: History of the U.S. Politics of the U.S. U.S. economy U.S. presidential rankings
- Published: 2009
- Publisher: Independent Institute
- Publication place: United States
- Pages: 484
- ISBN: 9781598130225
- Dewey Decimal: 973.09/9

Recarving Rushmore: Ranking the Presidents on Peace, Prosperity, And Liberty is a non-fiction book authored by American socio-political commentator Ivan Eland. Published in 2009 by the Independent Institute, the book reviews the history of the United States, ranking presidents who have led the nation. Taking issue with previous accounts in which historians have ranked the officials, the author applies his libertarian values to judge each president.

LewRockwell.com published a supportive review of the book. The official website of the U.S. Libertarian Party praised Recarving Rushmore as well in a blog post about the book, with Eland's writing lauded as being "direct and fair".

A revised version of the book came out in 2014.

The title alludes to the famous American monument Mount Rushmore, also known as the Shrine of Democracy.

== Background and contents ==
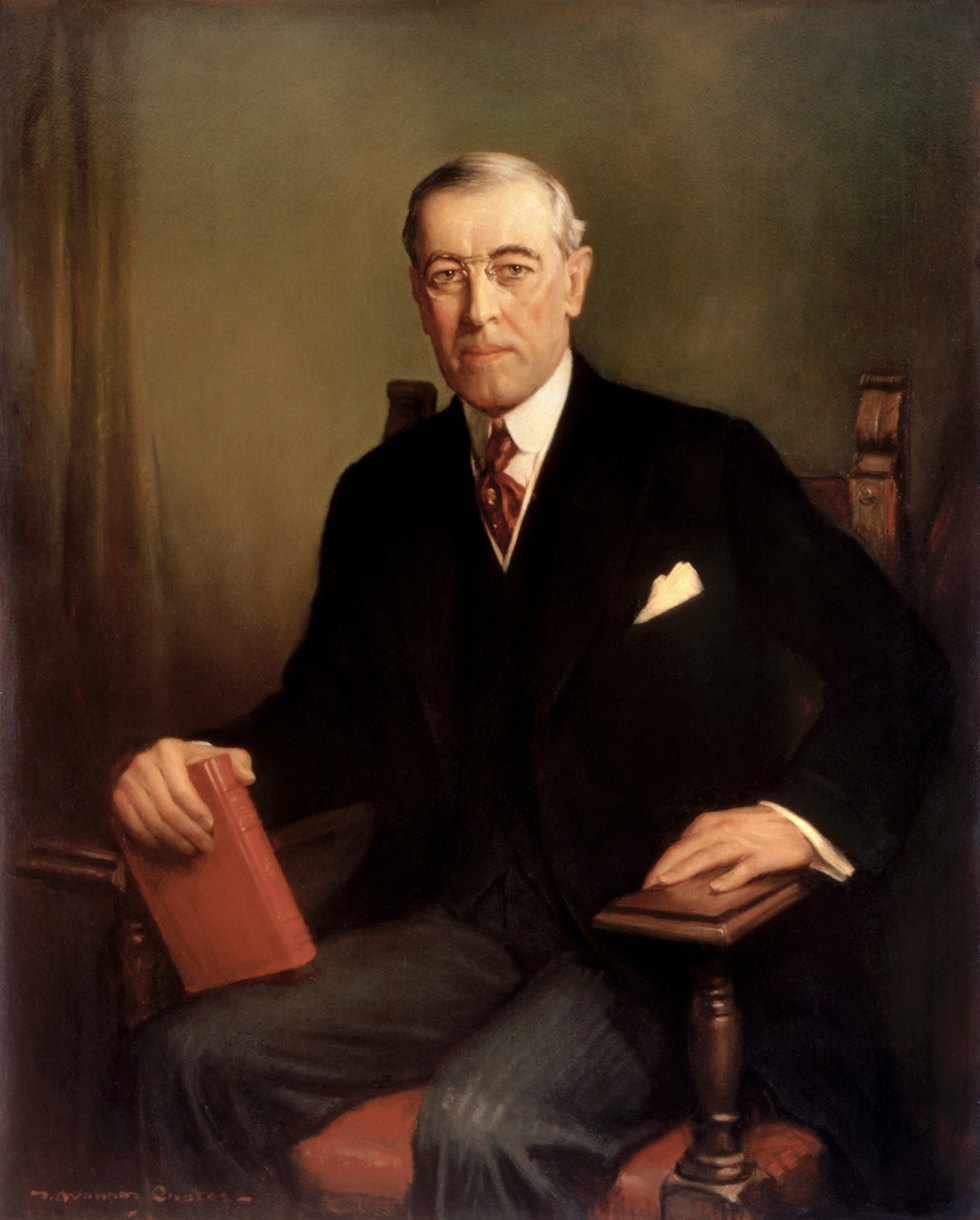
President Woodrow Wilson was the worst individual to hold the high office, in Eland's opinion, due to actions such as Wilson's repressive domestic conduct undertaken during World War I and the enacting of costly, expansive economic programs.

Eland has served as a senior fellow at the Independent Institute. In terms of public service, he has spent fifteen years working for the U.S. Congress on foreign affairs, particularly focusing on national security issues. As a libertarian commentator, his writings have appeared within multiple publications.

Starting with George Washington, Eland expresses his willingness to criticize individuals who have otherwise received high praise from historians. He condemns Washington's conduct during the Whiskey Rebellion in particular, for example. The author describes the first president's actions as inherently reckless. Later serving leaders who attract particular scorn and who receive low rankings in Eland's analysis include Andrew Jackson, Theodore Roosevelt, and Franklin D. Roosevelt. In contrast to other, conservative-based takes on history, Eland additionally considers Jimmy Carter to have been a better president than Carter's immediate successor, Ronald Reagan, and he goes so far as to label Carter as the best modern president in U.S. history.

In some cases, the author agrees with past criticisms of particular presidents undertaken by more mainstream historians. For instance, Eland condemns Zachary Taylor for the leader's lack of a response to the "shameful murder" of indigenous American tribes during the California Gold Rush. The author additionally blames Franklin Pierce for pushing policies that benefited slavery and ultimately led to the American Civil War in Eland's opinion.

Using the tripartite model of evaluating leaders based on promoting peace, advancing the U.S. economy, and proliferating liberty, the author ultimately concludes that John Tyler was the greatest American president. Grover Cleveland and Martin Van Buren take the second and third ranks on the list, respectively. Woodrow Wilson, in Eland's opinion, was the worst president in U.S. history. In sum, Eland writes that Wilson "made the world safe for war, autocracy, and colonialism".

In terms of the previous president (when the book was initially published, in 2009), the author expresses a dim view of George W. Bush. He asserts that the leader implemented "aggressive foreign policies" that "undermined the republic at home".

== Reception ==
LewRockwell.com published a supportive review by Brion McClanahan of the Abbeville Institute. Although finding fault with Eland's approach at times, with McClanahan remarking that Constitutional "restraint sometimes means doing nothing even if doing nothing is politically incorrect or out of step with modern libertarian ideology", McClanahan considered Eland's willingness to slaughter "several sacred cows in the process" of making broader arguments laudable in contrast to "establishment groupthink". McClanahan also stated that Eland's "breezy writing and short chapters allow for a quick and punchy read."

The official website of the U.S. Libertarian Party published a supportive blog post about the book in February 2009, with Eland's writing praised as being "direct and fair".

== See also ==
- 2009 in literature
- Historical rankings of presidents of the United States
- Libertarianism
- Mount Rushmore
- The Leaders We Deserved
