= The Leaders We Deserved =

2008 nonfiction book

- First edition hardcover image
- Author: Alvin S. Felzenberg
- Language: English
- Subject: History of the U.S. Politics of the U.S. U.S. economy U.S. presidential rankings
- Published: 2008
- Publisher: Basic Books
- Publication place: United States
- Pages: 480
- ISBN: 9780465002917

The Leaders We Deserved, also known as The Leaders We Deserved (and a Few We Didn't), is a non-fiction book written by historian Alvin S. Felzenberg. Published by Basic Books in 2008, the work chronicles United States history with a specific focus on the relative performances of different national leaders, the author contrasting his categorized approach with what he views as the sloppier record of past rankings. Presidents receive distinct analysis based on multiple factors including economic wisdom, ideal-based foresight, personal character, and more in the book.

In the book, the author concludes that Abraham Lincoln was America's greatest president. James Buchanan, Lincoln's immediate predecessor, occupies the dead last slot. Andrew Johnson, Lincoln's immediate successor, ranks next to last.

== Background and contents ==
Felzenberg's broad motivation for the book came from his interest in American presidents and his intent "not to fix their reputations in concrete, but to provoke discussion."

Looking back at past discussions over the various American presidents and historical rankings later made of them, the author argues that the academic process has fallen victim to certain negative trends, and he stresses that the analysis must not only attempt to evaluate individuals based on broad assessments of their performance but on a composite approach looking at different leadership categories. These, in Felzenberg's opinion, should include looking at diverse factors from the performance of the U.S. economy due to presidential actions to leaders' behaviors in advancing the causes of individual liberty to intellectual competence in the administrations managed by the presidents and more.

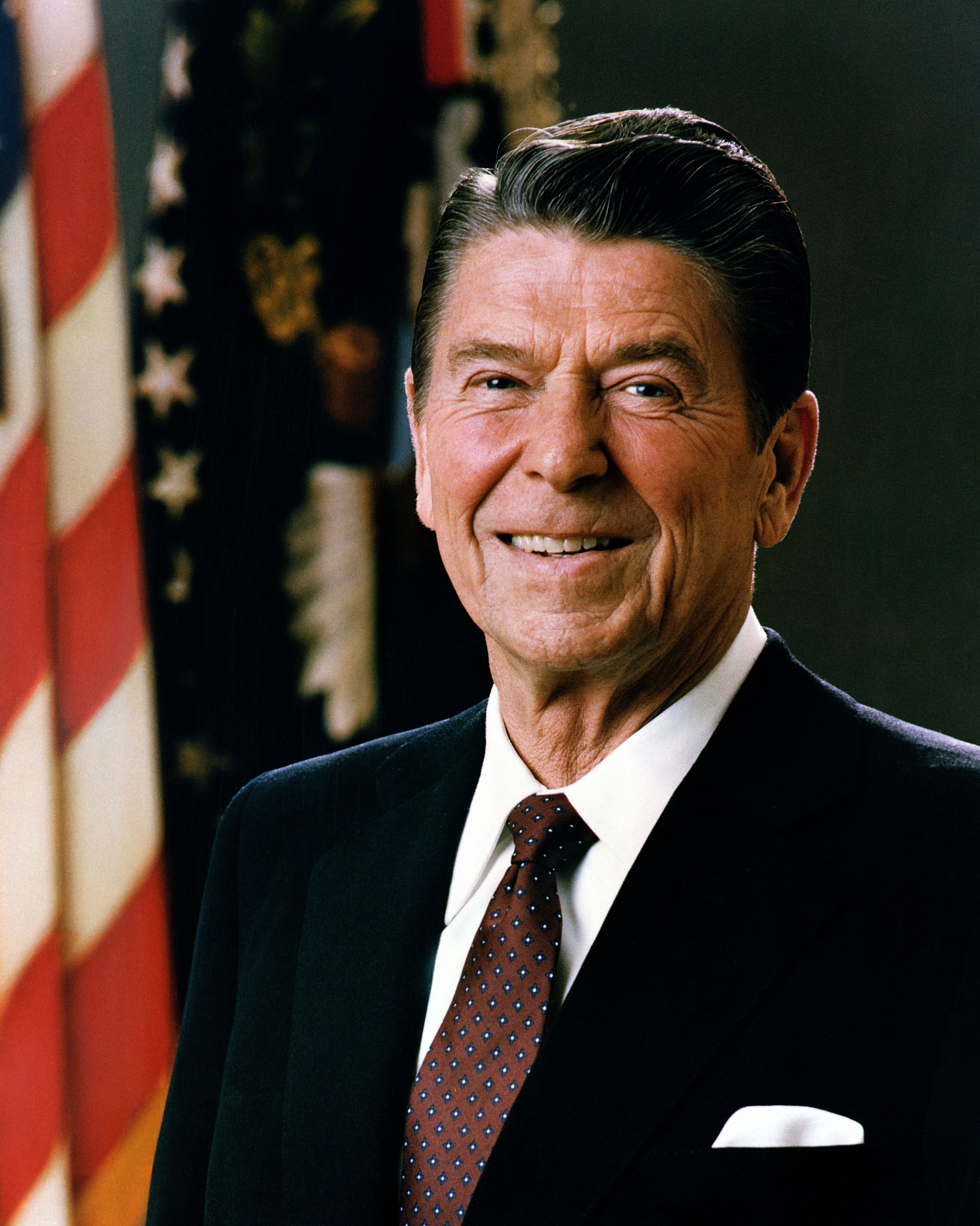
The author particularly lauds the achievements of Ronald Reagan's administration, labeling the statesman as one of America's top three greatest leaders for reasons such as Reagan's Cold War policies.

In his study of American history, the author finds fault with conventional wisdom in certain areas and agrees with it in others. In particular, Felzenberg's assessment of Abraham Lincoln as America's greatest president is followed closely by that of George Washington as its second greatest while both Ronald Reagan and Theodore Roosevelt tie for third place. Dwight D. Eisenhower falls into fifth place.

In contrast to Lincoln's placement, James Buchanan, Lincoln's immediate predecessor, occupies the dead last slot. Andrew Johnson, Lincoln's immediate successor, ranks next to last. Felzenberg chooses not to evaluate historic leaders James A. Garfield and William Henry Harrison as well as then currently serving president George W. Bush.

In terms of the general conclusions of his analysis, Felzenberg later stated,

"The best presidents were intellectually curious, were good communicators, advanced a vision that proved beneficial for the nation, availed themselves of the technological innovations of their times to advance their agendas, drew upon the best talent available, and related to people from all walks of life. The worst presidents were 'been there, done that' know-it-alls, were set in their ways, bore grudges, grumbled in public about all the burdens of office, had a limited world-view, and stretched the powers of their office for power’s sake."

== Later comments by the author ==
In an interview with the website Freakonomics.com after the book came out, Felzenberg stated that he believed that physical endurance should be another category by which presidents should be evaluated. He remarked, "The endless 24/7 cycle of appearances, interviews, fundraising, and all the rest that goes along with running for president that the two top contenders [running in 2008] have endured reminds us that the job of president almost demands superhuman qualities."

== See also ==
- 2008 in literature
- Historical rankings of presidents of the United States
- Personal character
  - Competence (human resources)
  - Foresight (psychology)
  - Moral idealism
- Personal endurance
- Recarving Rushmore
