= Antiwar.com =

Online non-interventionism magazine

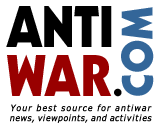

- Screenshot Screenshot of Antiwar.com on April 7, 2025
- Website type: Advocacy journalism
- Founded: 1995
- Owner: Randolph Bourne Institute
- Editor: Eric Garris
- Website: antiwar.com

Antiwar.com is an American political website founded in 1995 that describes itself as devoted to non-interventionism and as opposing imperialism and war. It has a right-wing libertarian perspective and is a project of the Randolph Bourne Institute. The website states that it is "fighting the next information war”.

== Stance ==
The site's first objective, in its own words, "was to fight against intervention in the Balkans under the Clinton presidency." It says it "applied the same principles to Clinton's campaigns in Haiti and Kosovo and bombings of Sudan and Afghanistan." Antiwar.com opposed the US wars in Iraq and Afghanistan and generally opposes interventionism, including the US bombing of Serbia and the US occupation of Afghanistan. It has also condemned aggressive military action and other forms of belligerence on the part of other governments, as well as what contributors view as the fiscal and civil liberties consequences of war.

Wen Stephenson of The Atlantic described the site in 1999 as marked by "a decidely [sic] right-wing cast of thought." Its founders described themselves as libertarians, and the two principal co-founders were involved in libertarian Republican politics at the time. The Guardian described it in as "libertarian, anti-interventionist" in 2016; James Kirchick in The Washington Post called it a "paleoconservative clearinghouse" in 2018; and Salon.com described in 2021 it as "right-wing".

The site publishes opinion from a range of perspectives, publishing "critiques of American foreign policy from the far left and the far right," according to The New Yorker, and featuring writers such as the paleoconservative isolationist Pat Buchanan, right libertarians such as Ron Paul, and left libertarians such as Noam Chomsky, Juan Cole, and Code Pink co-founder Medea Benjamin.

== History ==
The site was founded on 24 December 1995 by Justin Raimondo and Eric Garris, as a response to the Bosnian war. It is a 501(c)(3) nonprofit foundation, operating under the auspices of the Randolph Bourne Institute, based in Atherton, California. It was previously affiliated with the Center for Libertarian Studies and functioned before that as an independent, ad-supported website.

In 2006, Google suspended it from its AdSense advertising network, which was then the source of a significant portion of its income, due to its hosting of explicit photos of abuses committed by United States troops at the Abu Ghraib prison in Iraq, categorised by Google as "gore".

=== Lawsuit against the FBI ===
In 2011, the site discovered it was being monitored by the Federal Bureau of Investigation. After their Freedom of Information Act request failed to produce results, they worked with the American Civil Liberties Union of Northern California which in May 2013 filed a freedom of the press lawsuit for full FBI records on Antiwar.com, Eric Garris and Justin Raimondo. The documents received in November 2013 indicated that the FBI in San Francisco, and later in Newark, New Jersey, began monitoring the site after Eric Garris passed along to the FBI a threat to hack the Antiwar.com website. The FBI mistakenly took this as an actual threat against its own website and began monitoring Antiwar.com and its editors. Eric Garris demanded the FBI correct its file. In September 2019, the Ninth Circuit Court of Appeals ruled that the FBI must delete its memo documenting Garris' First Amendment activities.

In 2017, the court ordered the FBI to give Antiwar.com access to all the records of the investigation without redaction and to pay $300,000 to the ACLU lawyers. Antiwar.com lost the part of the case that claimed violations of the Privacy Act by the FBI. Antiwar.com and the ACLU appealed the Privacy Act claim and the appeal went to the 9th Circuit Court of Appeals. In 2019, the 9th Circuit three-judge panel unanimously ruled against the FBI and order them to expunge all records from the investigation. Civil Liberties groups like the ACLU and the Electronic Frontier Foundation hailed the ruling as a victory for privacy rights of journalists and activists.

== Personnel ==
Notable site personnel have included:

- Justin Raimondo (1951–2019), founder and editorial director
- Eric Garris, founder, webmaster, and managing editor
- Scott Horton (born 1976), assistant editor

== Notable contributors ==
Featured writers include:

- Praful Bidwai
- Alan Bock
- Ivan Eland
- Philip Giraldi
- Ran HaCohen
- David R. Henderson
- Justin Raimondo
- Michael Scheuer
- George Szamuely

The site syndicates columns and op-eds by such authors as:

- Pat Buchanan
- Kevin Carson
- Noam Chomsky
- Alexander Cockburn
- Juan Cole
- Jonathan Cook
- Reese Erlich
- Robert Fisk
- Kathy Kelly
- Jack Matlock
- William Lind
- Ron Paul
- John Pilger
- Gareth Porter
- Charley Reese
- Paul Craig Roberts
- Cindy Sheehan
- Norman Solomon

== Antiwar Radio ==
Antiwar Radio is hosted by Scott Horton and others including Charles Goyette. It features interviews focused on war, international relations, the growth of state power, civil liberties, and related matters. Guests have included:

- Mark Ames
- Julian Assange
- David T. Beito
- James Bovard
- Francis Boyle
- David Bromwich
- Noam Chomsky
- Patrick Cockburn
- Juan Cole
- Robert Dreyfuss
- Jeff Frazee
- Sibel Edmonds
- Ivan Eland
- Daniel Ellsberg
- Philip Giraldi
- Charles Goyette
- Glenn Greenwald
- William Norman Grigg
- David R. Henderson
- Nat Hentoff
- Robert Higgs
- Scott Horton
- Dahr Jamail
- Raed Jarrar
- Karen Kwiatkowski
- Jim Lobe
- Trevor Lyman
- Eric Margolis
- Ray McGovern
- Cole Miller
- Brandon Neely
- Robert Pape
- Ron Paul
- Gareth Porter
- Coleen Rowley
- Kirkpatrick Sale
- Michael Scheuer
- Cindy Sheehan
- Helen Thomas
- Christina Tobin
- Jesse Trentadue
- Jesse Walker
- Philip Weiss
- Andy Worthington
- Kevin Zeese

== Antiwar News with Dave DeCamp ==
Antiwar News with Dave DeCamp, the current news editor of Antiwar.com, shares daily summaries of the top U.S. foreign policy news stories from a non-interventionist perspective. Dave DeCamp was announced as a runner-up awardee of the 2023 Pierre Sprey Award for Defense Reporting and Analysis for delivering "a comprehensive and essential corrective to the tsunami of slanted misinformation that appears each day in our country's mainstream media".

== Reactions ==
The Washington Post's Linton Weeks described it "a thoughtful, well-organized site" in 1999. Scott McConnell of The American Conservative wrote in 2010 the New York Press that Antiwar.com was "strikingly successful" and "could claim more readers than Rupert Murdoch’s Weekly Standard once the [Balkan] war began." When Raimondo died in 2019, Patrick Buchanan said that "In the three decades since [1991], no man in America worked harder or did more to resist the interventionist impulses of the American establishment and the wars they produced than Justin and his Antiwar website."

David Bernstein included it in 2012 among "far left anti-Israel sites that have ties to the anti-Semitic far-right or are known for playing footsie with anti-Semitism". Antisemitism scholar David Renton in 2021 gave the website as an example of how "ideas [which] started in the American far right ... migrated into British left-wing circles without people having any idea where they began." Anti-fascist researcher Matthew N. Lyons describes the "paleocon-sponsored" website as an example of left-right alliance.

In 2019, researchers from The Open University found that the crowdsourced MyWOT program labeled Antiwar.com as "trustworthy", while the OpenSources evaluator tagged the website as "conspiracy, clickbait and bias".

== See also ==
- List of anti-war organizations
