= Ivan Eland =

American defense analyst and author

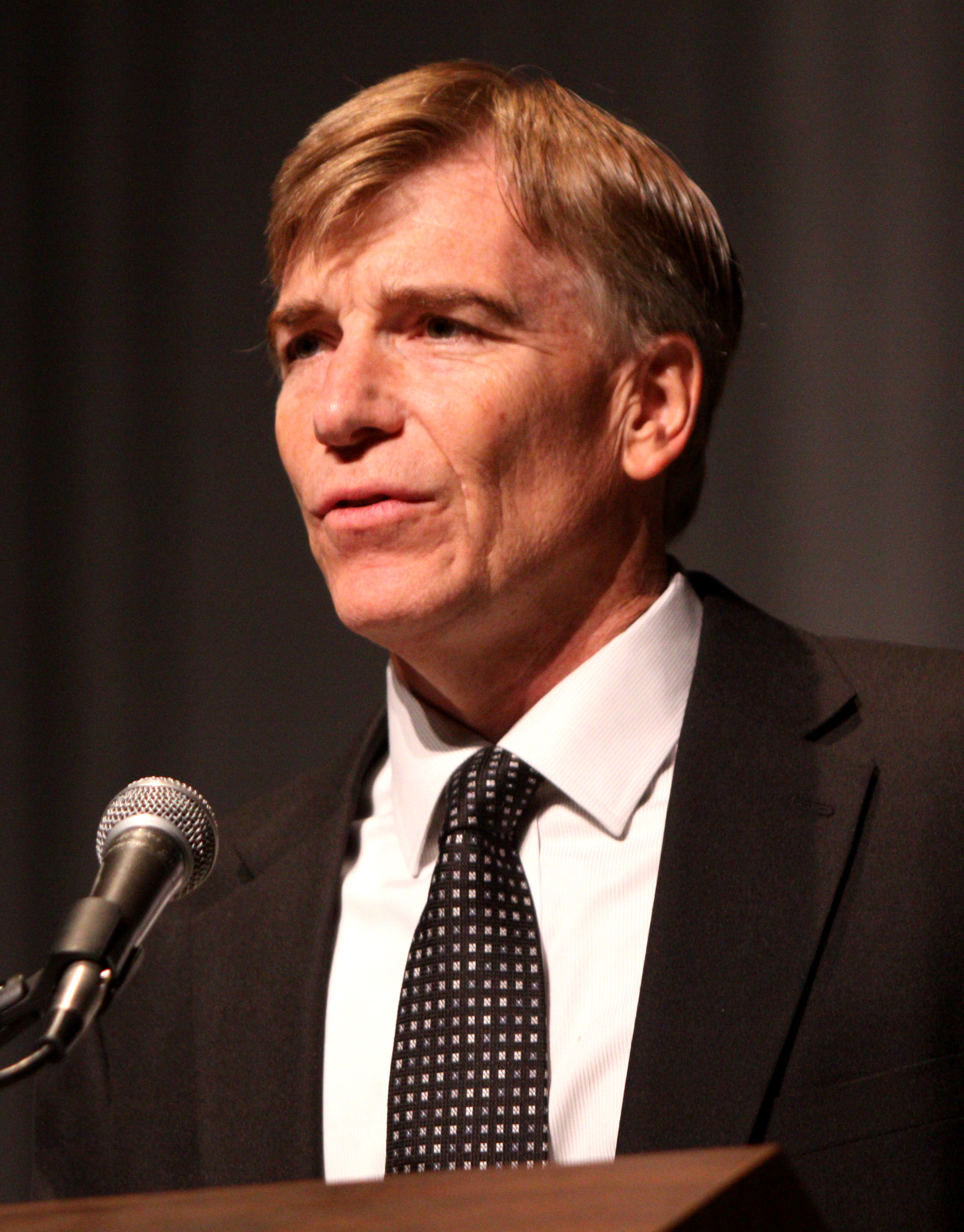
- Eland in September 2011
- Born: February 23, 1958 (age 68)
- Occupations: Defense analyst; writer
- Political party: Libertarian

Academic background
- Education: George Washington University (MBA, PhD)

Academic work
- Main interests: Diplomatic relations, nuclear strategy, terrorism studies

Ivan Eland (/ˈiːlənd/; born February 23, 1958) is an American defense analyst and writer. He is a Senior Fellow and Director of the Center on Peace and Liberty at the Independent Institute. Eland's writings generally propose libertarian and non-interventionist policies. Books that he has authored include Recarving Rushmore.

== Life ==
Eland received an M.B.A. in Applied Economics and a Ph.D. in National Security Policy from George Washington University. He has previously served as Director of Defense Policy Studies at the Cato Institute, as Principal Defense Analyst at the Congressional Budget Office, as an investigator dealing with national security and intelligence for the Government Accountability Office, and on a House Committee on Foreign Affairs special investigation of allegations that the U.S. sold weapons to Iraq prior to 1991. He has testified before the House Committee on Oversight and Government Reform and the Senate Committee on Foreign Relations.

Ivan Eland is the author of Putting "Defense" Back into U.S. Defense Policy (2001), The Empire Has No Clothes: U.S. Foreign Policy Exposed (2004), Recarving Rushmore: Ranking the Presidents on Peace, Prosperity, and Liberty (2008; updated edition 2014) and Partitioning for Peace: An Exit Strategy for Iraq (2009). He has also written essays, including forty-five in-depth studies on national security issues, and numerous popular articles.

== Political opinions ==
Eland is a libertarian, generally supporting non-interventionism and limited government. In his 2008 book Recarving Rushmore, Eland argued that historians' rankings of US presidents fail to reflect presidents' actual services to the country. In the book, he rated 40 US presidents on the basis of whether or not their policies promoted peace, prosperity, and liberty during their tenures; John Tyler and Grover Cleveland were ranked the two strongest, while Harry Truman and Woodrow Wilson came in last.

Eland once named Jimmy Carter "the best modern president," praising Carter's restrained foreign policy and deregulation of several American industries. Eland continues to strongly oppose the 2003 invasion of Iraq, and called George W. Bush's presidency "one of the worst of all time." Eland is the Assistant Editor of the Independent Review, writes a regular column for the website Antiwar.com, contributes frequently at Consortium News Robert Parry's website of investigative journalism. Eland is on the Advisory Council of the Democracy Institute.

== See also ==
- Libertarianism in the United States
