= Eric Garris =

American journalist (born 1953)

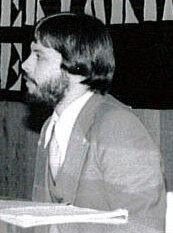
- Eric Garris in 1978
- Born: December 24, 1953 (age 72); Paris, France
- Occupations: Activist, journalist, writer
- Political party: Peace and Freedom Party (1960s–1975); Libertarian (1975–1983); Republican (1983–present)

Eric Garris (born December 24, 1953) is an activist in the libertarian movement in the United States, reaching back to the Vietnam War. He is the founder and webmaster of a daily nonpartisan news source, Antiwar.com, which was launched in 1995.

== Background ==
Garris was born in Paris, France and raised in Southern California from the age of 2. He became politically active at an early age, organizing rallies and distributing leaflets in his Los Angeles high school and actively resisting the Vietnam war and draft. As a red diaper baby, Garris marched in civil rights demonstrations at age 8, was expelled from high school for instigating a riot at age 16, and became a Vietnam War draft resister by the time he was an adult. He considered himself a leftist for most of his early years, but that political position changed by the time he turned 20.

While living in Venice, California, in the 1960s, Garris became active in the Peace and Freedom Party, serving as National Committeeman and vice-chairman before forming a libertarian faction within the party in 1973. In 1975, he left the Peace and Freedom Party to become active in the Libertarian Party, eventually co-founding the Libertarian Radical Caucus with Justin Raimondo. In the 1980s, Garris and Raimondo left the Libertarian Party to engage the Republican Party. They formed the Libertarian Republican Organizing Committee (LROC) and backed Pat Buchanan in his 1992 presidential run. On November 5, 2018, Garris married Susana Simon Pio from São Paulo, Brazil.

== Philosophy ==
Garris cites his antiwar stance as the one constant throughout the evolution of his political point of view and has said that being antiwar led him to libertarianism. His view that war is the greatest violator of human and property rights is reflected in Antiwar.com's mission to lead the non-interventionist cause in the United States and abroad.

== Opposition to the Briggs Initiative ==
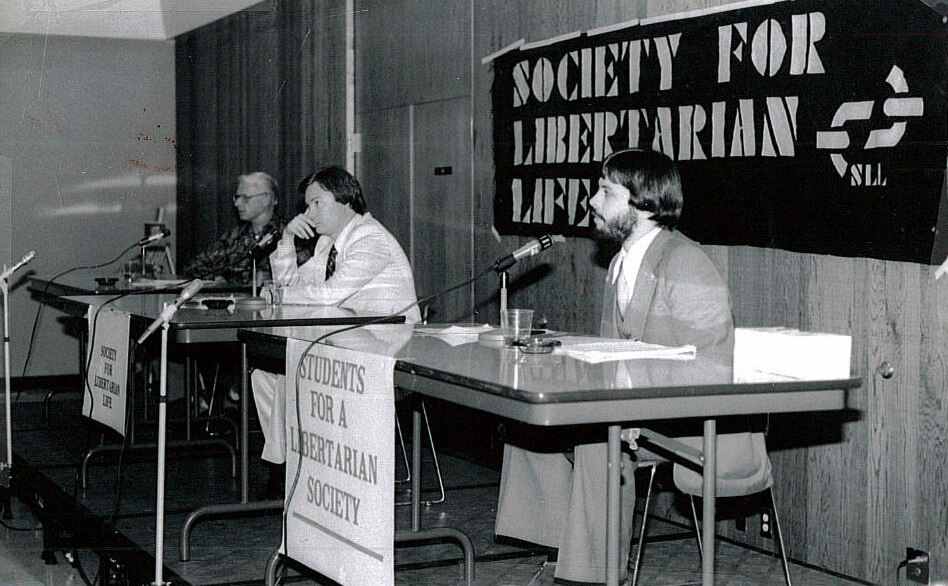
Senator John Briggs and Eric Garris debate on October 26, 1978, over the Briggs Initiative. Garris in foreground. Briggs failed to show up.

As a pro-gay rights libertarian, Garris was active in opposing and defeating the 1978 Briggs Initiative, which was authored by state senator John V. Briggs, (R-Fullerton). A Universal Free Libertarian Church minister, Garris was scheduled to debate Senator Briggs at California State University, Fullerton (CSUF) on October 26, 1978. Hours before the debate, which was sponsored by Society for Libertarian Life, Briggs failed to appear and substituted Prof. George Kent. Brigg's aide, Don Sizemore, later stated that the senator had received several death threats just before the debate. Garris was one of the four plaintiffs who filed a breach of contract against Briggs, litigated by Newport Beach attorney David Bergland.

== Libertarian activism ==
In 2000, Garris described his history with the Libertarian Party (LP) as follows:

In 1973 I joined the Libertarian Party. I served as a National Committee member, California State Director, and candidate and campaign manager numerous times. I am still a life member of the LP, but I am no longer registered LP. I still consider myself to be a libertarian with strongly held beliefs and, as Webmaster of Antiwar.com and LewRockwell.com, consider myself an activist in the libertarian movement. I still read much of the LP's literature, have many friends and associates in the LP, often even vote Libertarian. I also subscribe to the LP's internal email discussion list.

When Murray Rothbard and his supporters began to feel that the Libertarian Party, through outfits such as the Cato Institute, was becoming too cozy with the Republican Party and its policies, they founded the "Libertarian Radical Caucus" which was led primarily by Garris and his most consistent collaborator Justin Raimondo. After the Libertarian Party's major schism of 1983, they began an entryist strategy into the Republican Party, and during the 1990s they became strong backers of Pat Buchanan.

== Campaigns for public office ==
Eric Garris first ran for public office in 1972 when he ran as a Peace and Freedom Party candidate for the California State Assembly in district 61. He received 3,488 votes for 3.8% of the vote. Garris ran for office a second time in 1974. Running as a Peace and Freedom Party candidate in the 22 State Senate district, Garris received 4,316 votes for 2.3% In 1980, Garris ran as a libertarian for the 5th district California State Senate seat. In a two-way race, Garris received 21,162 votes for 14.6% of the vote. In 1983, Garris ran as a libertarian in the special election for California's 5th congressional district. He received 408 votes for 0.5% of the total vote. In 1990, Garris ran as a Republican for the California State Assembly in the 21st district. He received 25,695 votes for 29.1% of the vote in a two-way race

== Internet activism ==
Early on, Garris saw the potential of the internet to advance his political beliefs. In 1995, he founded Antiwar.com in response to the Clinton administration's intervention in Bosnia's civil war. Founded on Randolph Bourne's idea that "War is the Health of the State," Antiwar.com aggregates foreign policy news links from a variety of perspectives to inform the American people and the world about the overseas plans of the American government and serve as a research tool for "'citizen experts.'"

From 1999 to 2012, Garris was the webmaster for LewRockwell.com, the webmagazine of libertarian political commentator Lew Rockwell. He is also webmaster for Ballot Access News, a news site published by activist Richard Winger that raises awareness of restrictive ballot access laws.

== See also ==
- List of peace activists
