= Alvin S. Felzenberg =

American historian

Alvin Stephen Felzenberg is an American author, columnist, consultant, educator, historian, public official, and spokesperson. He served as spokesperson of the 9/11 Commission. He has authored books on American history and biographies of U.S. presidents, including The Leaders We Deserved (2008) and A Man and His Presidents: The Political Odyssey of William F. Buckley, Jr. (2018).

Since 2007, he has been a professor at the University of Pennsylvania in Philadelphia.

Felzenberg is a political conservative who considers Ronald Reagan a "great" president who "belongs on Mount Rushmore."

== Early life and education ==
Felzenberg holds a B.A. and M.A. from Rutgers University and an M.A. Ph.D. from Princeton University.

== Career ==
Between 1982 and 1989, Felzenberg was assistant secretary of state of New Jersey in the administration of Governor Thomas Kean. Felzenberg served as a senior staff member of the Government Affairs and Oversight Committee of the U.S. House of Representatives.

=== 9/11 Commission ===
Following the September 11 attacks, Felzenberg was appointed spokesperson for the 9/11 Commission, a government commission that operated from November 2002 to August 2004 and was chaired by former two-term New Jersey governor Thomas Kean, that investigated the September 11 attacks and issued its findings in the 9/11 Commission Report in August 2004. He subsequently served as director of communications for the Joint Economic Committee of the United States Congress.

=== George W. Bush administration ===
Felzenberg served as the special assistant and adviser to the National Broadcasting Board of Governors, as consultant to the U.S. Secretary of the Navy, and as director of community outreach and public liaison for the Office of Secretary in the U.S. Department of Defense during the George W. Bush administration.

=== Academia ===
Felzenberg was a fellow at the Harvard Institute of Politics at Harvard Kennedy School at Harvard University. He has lectured at Princeton, Yale, George Washington, and Johns Hopkins universities. Since 2007, Felzenberg has been visiting lecturer at the Annenberg School for Communications at the University of Pennsylvania.

=== Author ===
Felzenberg is the author of The Keys to a Successful Presidency, Governor Tom Kean: From the New Jersey Statehouse to the 9/11 Commission, The Leaders We Deserved (and a Few We Didn't): Rethinking the Presidential Rating Game, and A Man and His Presidents: The Political Odyssey of William F. Buckley Jr. In January 2021, just before Donald Trump left the presidency, Felzenberg stated that an update of his evaluation of U.S. presidents would rank Trump among the worst ever.

Felzenberg is a regular contributor to several periodicals, including The Philadelphia Inquirer, U.S. News & World Report, The Weekly Standard, and National Review.
