= Vanguard Cellular =

Former US mobile phone company

Vanguard Cellular Systems, Inc. was a mobile phone carrier with headquarters in Greensboro, North Carolina. It was the largest independent non-wireline cellular carrier in the 1990s. It was acquired by AT&T in 1999.

== History ==
In September 1982, the company Collins, Hagel, and Clarke was formed by Bill Collins, Don Clarke, Dave Smith, and Chuck Hagel. In late 1984, "Collins, Hagel and Clarke and a group of North Carolina investors rolled all their cellular operations into a new company they called vanguard, dedicated to the telecommunications business. While the three original partners all initially served on the Vanguard board, Hagel was the only one of the three who became a Vanguard employee. He was an executive vice president until 1987."

In 1999, Vanguard was acquired by AT&T.

== Operations ==
Vanguard Cellular Systems operated cellular systems in Maine, New York, Pennsylvania, West Virginia, South Carolina, and Florida and owned interests in other systems throughout the United States and internationally. Vanguard initially deployed the analog Nortel AMPS technology, and later migrated to the TDMA-based Digital AMPS (D-AMPS) technology.

== Founders ==
There were three founders of Vanguard: Haynes Griffin, Rich Preyer and Steve Leeolou.

Founder Steven R. Leeolou is now CEO at Conterra Ultra Broadband in Charlotte, NC which employs several former Vanguard employees. Haynes Griffin, founding CEO of Vanguard, has been active in several telecom businesses. He is the currently chairman and CEO of SmartSky Networks which is deploying a nationwide air to ground wireless network to serve the aviation industry. He is also chairman and CEO of Greensboro-based Insect Shield, which makes insect repellent apparel. Rich Preyer, the third Founder, has been a very meaningful leader in area activities.

== See also ==
- Mobile phone companies of the United States
- Defunct mobile phone companies of the United States
