= 2002 United States Senate election in Nebraska =

- November 5, 2002
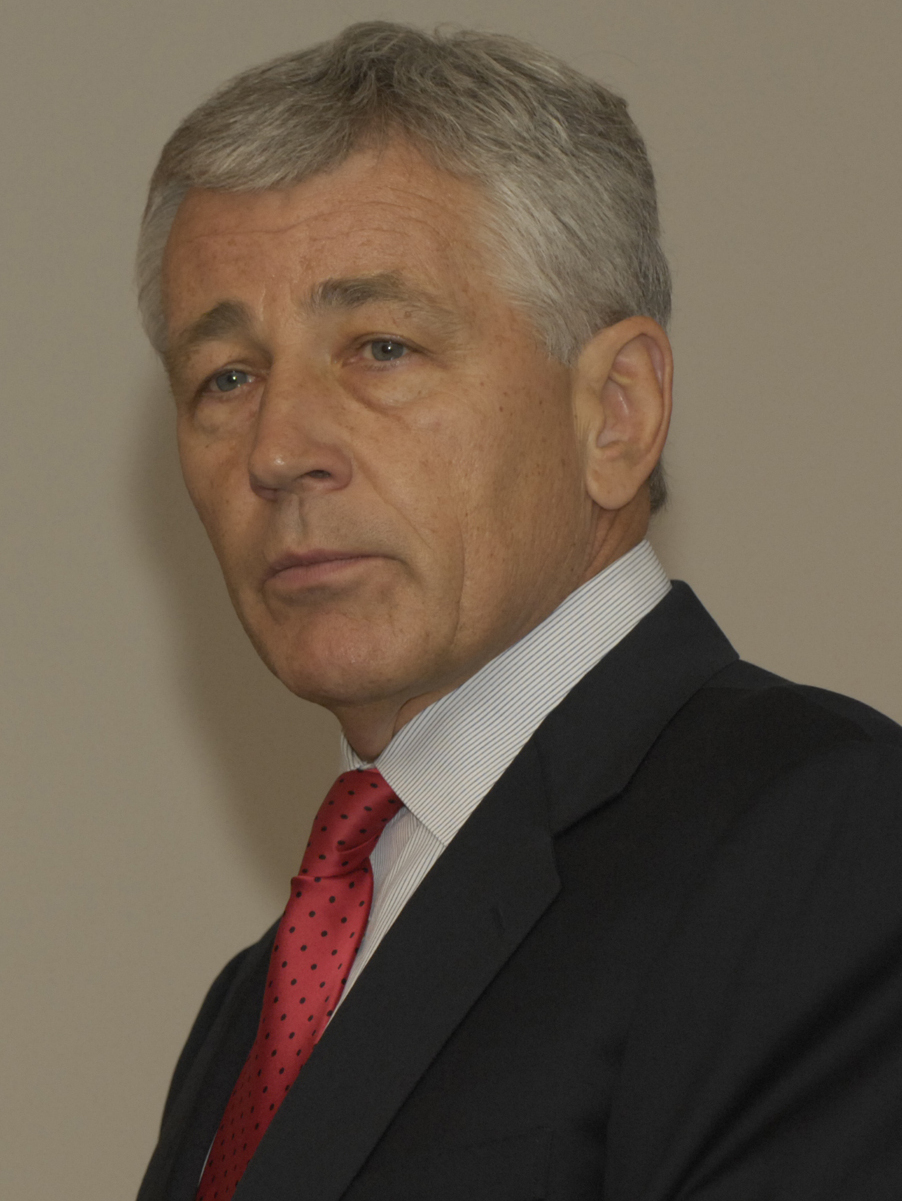

Nominee	Chuck Hagel	Charlie Matulka
Party	Republican	Democratic
Popular vote	397,438	70,290
Percentage	82.76%	14.64%
- County results Hagel: 60–70% 70–80% 80–90% >90%
U.S. senator before election
Chuck Hagel
Republican
Elected U.S. Senator
Chuck Hagel
Republican

The 2002 United States Senate election in Nebraska was held on November 5, 2002. Incumbent Republican U.S. Senator Chuck Hagel won re-election to a second term.

== Democratic primary ==
=== Candidates ===
- Charlie A. Matulka, construction worker
- Al Hamburg, perennial candidate

=== Results ===
Democratic primary results
Party	Candidate	Votes	%
Democratic	Charlie A. Matulka	33,922	59.31%
Democratic	Al Hamburg	23,272	40.69%
Total votes		57,194	100.00%

== Libertarian primary ==
=== Candidates ===
- John J. Graziano, businessman

=== Results ===
Libertarian Party primary results
Party	Candidate	Votes	%
Libertarian	John J. Graziano	228	100.00%
Total votes		228	100.00%

== Republican primary ==
=== Candidates ===
- Chuck Hagel, incumbent U.S. Senator

=== Results ===
Republican Party primary results
Party	Candidate	Votes	%
Republican	Chuck Hagel (inc.)	144,160	100.00%
Total votes		144,160	100.00%

== General election ==
=== Candidates ===
- Chuck Hagel (Republican), incumbent U.S. Senator
- Charlie Matulka (Democratic), construction worker
- John Graziano (Libertarian), businessman
- Phil Chase (Independent)

=== Predictions ===
Source	Ranking	As of
Sabato's Crystal Ball	Safe R	November 4, 2002

=== Results ===
2002 United States Senate election in Nebraska
Party	Candidate	Votes	%	±%
Republican	Chuck Hagel (inc.)	397,438	82.76%	+25.36%
Democratic	Charlie A. Matulka	70,290	14.64%	−27.96%
Libertarian	John J. Graziano	7,423	1.55%	+0.15%
Independent	Phil Chase	5,066	1.05%	—
Majority		327,148	68.13%	+53.31%
Total votes		480,217	100.00%	
Republican hold				

==== Counties that flipped from Democratic to Republican ====
- Lancaster (largest city: Lincoln)
- Saline (largest city: Crete)
- Greeley (largest city: Spalding)
- Gage (largest city: Beatrice)
- Dakota (largest city: South Sioux City)

== See also ==
- 2002 United States Senate elections
