= Charles Goyette =

American broadcaster

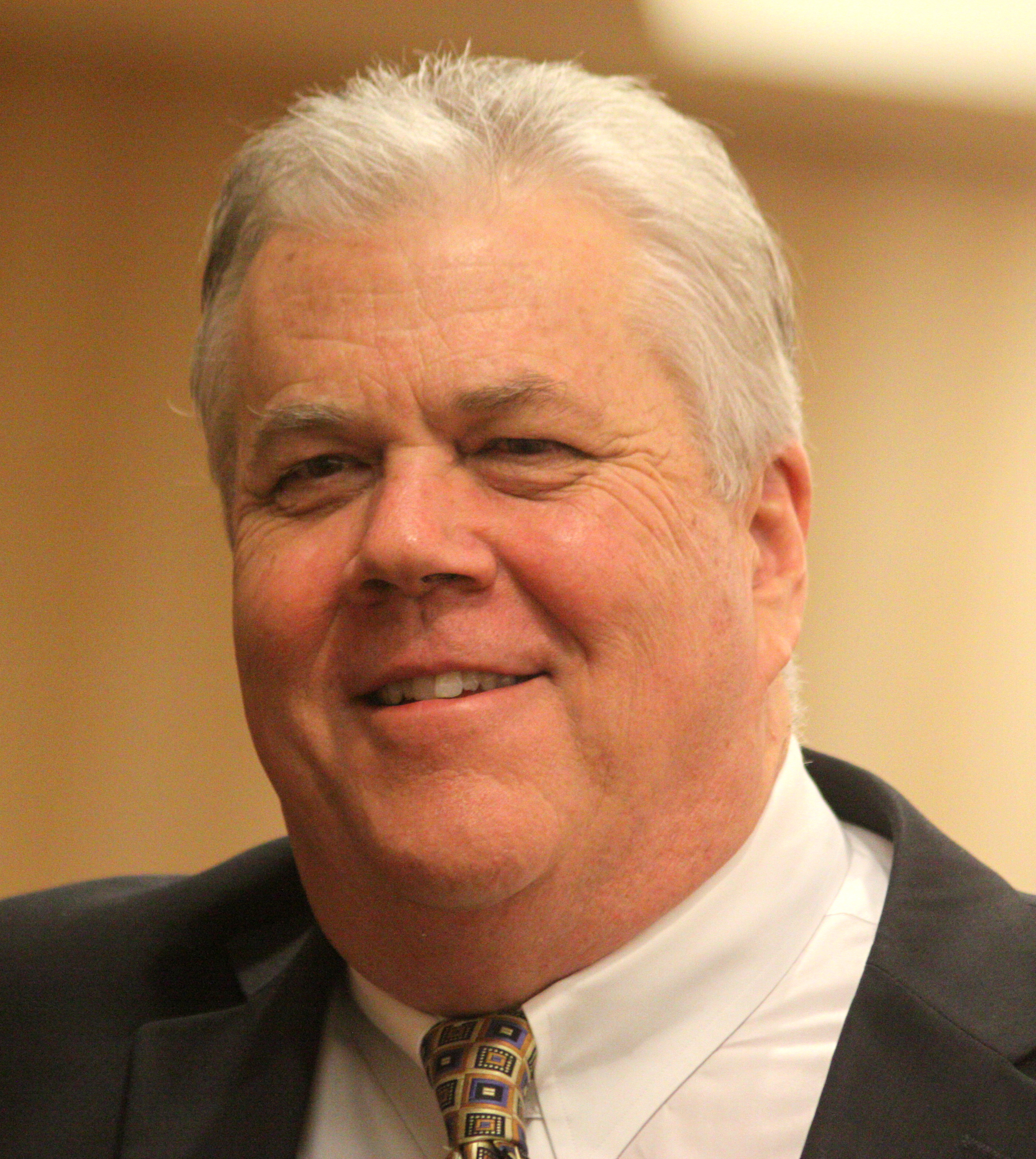
- Goyette in downtown Phoenix, Arizona in January 2011.
- Born: Charles Goyette
- Occupation: commentator

Charles Goyette is a libertarian commentator and talk radio host.

Goyette joins with former presidential candidate and Congressman Ron Paul for the nationally syndicated twice-daily radio commentary Ron Paul's America heard on 125 stations across the country, as well as Ron Paul and Charles Goyette -- The Weekly Podcast.

== Overview ==
He is the author of The Dollar Meltdown: Surviving the Impending Currency Crisis with Gold, Oil, and Other Unconventional Investments. He also wrote Red and Blue and Broke All Over: Restoring America's Free Economy.

Goyette is also the editor of the Freedom & Prosperity Letter, a monthly political and financial newsletter.

Goyette also writes a bi-weekly column for the financial website MoneyandMarkets.com.

Goyette has filled in for several nationally syndicated talk shows over the years, most recently on the Laura Ingraham Show in July 2014.

He formerly hosted talk radio shows based in Phoenix, Arizona on KTAR, KFYI, KXXT, and KFNX. His show aired for the last time on KFNX on June 13, 2008.

KFYI, owned by Clear Channel Communications, moved Goyette was moved from a prime "drive time" commuting slot to the less desirable 7–10 p.m. slot, which Goyette called "radio Outer Darkness." Goyette said that the move was in retaliation for Goyette's criticism of President George W. Bush and the 2003 invasion of Iraq; he wrote in early 2004 that he did not expect his contract to be renewed when it expired later that year.

He was named "Best Phoenix Talk Show Host" by the Phoenix New Times in 2003.

== Family history ==
Charles Goyette's father, Dr. Ed Goyette, Jr., was a professor of philosophy at Northern Arizona University in Flagstaff.

According to Arizona Daily Star newspaper reporter, David Leighton, Charles Goyette is the grandson of C. Edgar "Ed" Goyette, who was a prominent citizen of Tucson. Ed Goyette was the first student body president at the University of Arizona. He served as executive secretary of the Tucson Chamber of Commerce from 1940 to 1960, and much of Tucson's growth was due to his work in bringing new industry and military installations to the city. He was named Tucson's “Man of the Year” for 1958 by the Tucson Advertising Club and former Arizona governor Paul Fannin proclaimed Ed Goyette Day on April 5, 1960.

== Books ==
- The Dollar Meltdown: Surviving the Impending Currency Crisis with Gold, Oil, and Other Unconventional Investments. Portfolio. 2009. ISBN 978-1-59184-284-2.
- Red and Blue and Broke All Over: Restoring America's Free Economy. Sentinel. 2012. ISBN 978-1-59523-082-9.
