= The Future of Freedom Conference =

Series of libertarian conferences in the US

The Future of Freedom Conference is regarded as the first explicitly libertarian conference series ever held in the United States. Debuting in 1969, the conference's keynote speaker was Austrian economist Professor Ludwig von Mises.

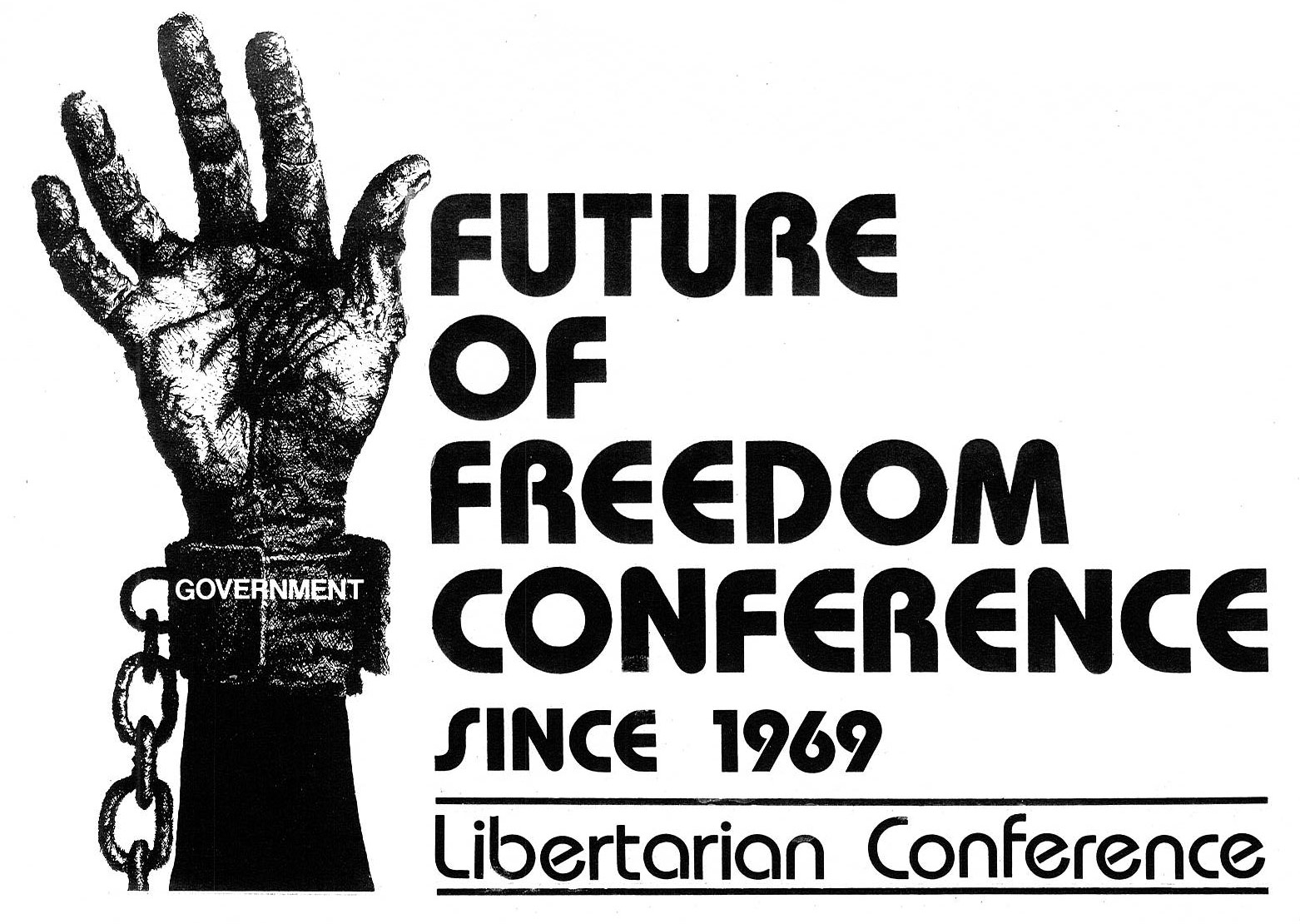
Future of Freedom conference 1969

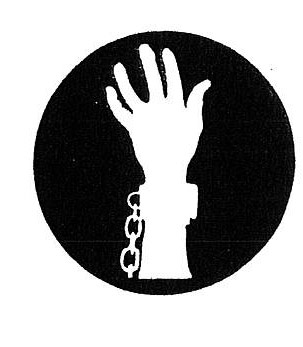
The Future of Freedom Conference 1969–1990

== The Ludwig von Mises Conference (1969) ==
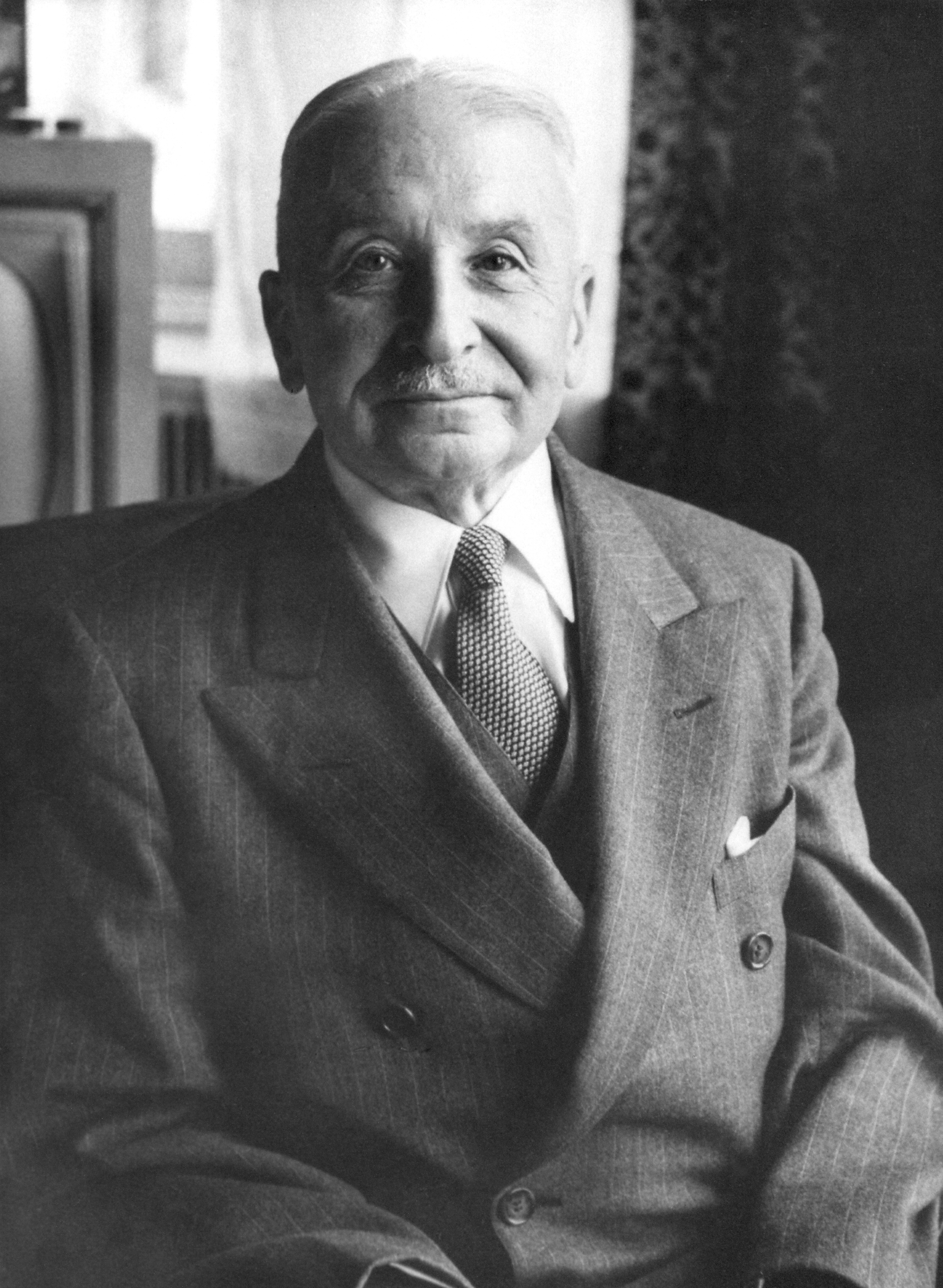
Ludwig von Mises

More than 200 students attended the Ludwig von Mises Conference that was held at Long Beach State University (now known as California State University, Long Beach) in May 1969, in response to Young Americans for Freedom's (YAF) purges of libertarian leaders just before the infamous national YAF St. Louis convention in August 1969.

In early March 1969, Dana Rohrabacher and Shawn Steel, co-chairs of California YAF, were removed by National YAF. Many purged leaders and county chairs would eventually organize a new student organization called the California Libertarian Alliance (CLA). One of their first endeavors was to hold a gathering of libertarian leaders, writers and economists.

The idea to have some type of gathering evolved into a full-fledged conference at a college. The conference was initially planned and organized under the leadership of Dana Rohrabacher, who was the main founder and chairman of the Libertarian Caucus of YAF from 1966 to 1969. Dana Rohrabacher, known as the "Johnny Grass-seed" of radical YAFers, later became a journalist, a speechwriter for President Reagan, and a U.S. Congressman in Southern California.

Other purged YAF members involved in the 1969 conference included the following: Gene Berkman, draft resister, later to become owner of Renaissance Books in Riverside, California; Bill "Shawn" Steel, USC student and statewide chairman of Youth for Reagan, later to become an attorney, a founder of the California Libertarian Party, and chairman of the California Republican Party; Ron Kimberling, later Dr. Ron Kimberling, radio show commentator who became executive director of the Ronald Reagan Foundation and Assistant Secretary for Higher Education in the last years of the Reagan administration; Dennis Turner, writer for Reason and computer programmer; John Schurman, psychology major and staff worker for Rampart College.

In 1981 Shawn Steel commented about the reasons for the first conference, writing that "Freedom-oriented people found themselves abandoned, either purged from the right or the left. Because of this political turmoil, we invited decentralists, individualists and voluntaryists in one forum to organize, discuss and study the philosophy we now call 'libertarianism.'"

Other speakers at 1969's Ludwig von Mises Conference included the following: R. C. Hoiles, longtime publisher of The Register (now known as the Orange County Register) in Santa Ana, California; Robert LeFevre, Rampart College founder and author; Skye D'Aureous (Durk Pearson), MIT graduate with a triple major in physics, biology, and psychology; John Hospers, philosophy professor at the University of Southern California.

Gary North, a conservative writer for the Christian newsletter Chalcedon Report, was horrified by what he saw at the conference. He accused the participants of "secular libertarianism" which he believed to be suicidal, especially the sinfulness of those who take illegal drugs. Instead of finding a conference hall full of "studious conservatives affirming faith in God and country," North instead discovered "eccentrics waving the black dollar sign flag" of anarchy.

The Ludwig von Mises Conference was sponsored by Long Beach State University YAF, California State University San Fernando Valley YAF, and the Action Coalition for Freedom.

== Left-Right Festival of Mind Liberation (1970) ==
On February 28 and March 1, 1970, the California Libertarian Alliance hosted the Left-Right Festival of Mind Liberation at the University of Southern California (USC), backed by Riqui and Seymour Leon of Robert LeFevre's relocated Rampart Institute in Santa Ana, California. This conference attempted to patch differences between left and right anti-statist and anti-authoritarian thinkers, but failed to generate "any potential Left-Right coalition in the gestation stage."

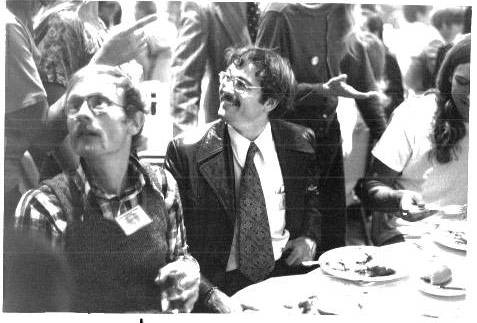
Left: Shawn Steel, Middle: Dana Rohrabacher

Rebecca E. Hlatch in A Generation Divided, reported "five hundred delegates met to discuss possibilities for a right-to-left cooperation." According to Dana Rohrabacher, he had high hopes of "forming a coalition between libertarians on the right and the pro-freedom elements on the left."

The keynote speaker was former president of Students for a Democratic Society (SDS) and author of Containment and Change, Carl Oglesby. "Designed to lay the groundwork for a libertarian/New Left anti-war coalition, Oglesby made the case that 'the Old Right and the New Left' were 'morally and politically' united in their opposition to war, and should work together."

Other featured speakers included: William Allen, University of California Los Angeles (UCLA) economist; F. A. Harper, founder of the Institute for Humane Studies; Rod Manis, Stanford University research economist and writer for Rampart College; John Hospers, USC philosophy professor; Tibor Machan, an owner of Reason magazine and doctoral candidate at University of California Santa Barbara (UCSB); Karl Hess, former speech writer for Senator Barry Goldwater, Newsweek editor and author of Community Technology; Dana Rohrabacher, purged California chairman of Young Americans for Freedom; Samuel Edward Konkin III (a.k.a. SEK3), chemistry graduate student and editor of New Libertarian Notes at New York University; Phillip Abbott Luce, a defector from the pro-red Chinese Progressive Labor Movement in 1964, author of Road to Revolution, and recently resigned college director of YAF.

Other notable speakers – at general sessions or in workshops – included: Harvey Hukari, former chair of Stanford University YAF, and a founder of the Free Campus Movement; Harry Pollard, president of the Henry George School in Los Angeles; Don Jackson and Marcus Overseth, gay-rights activists; Robert Sagehorn, author, editor of the Western World Review and an associate of Western World Press; Terry Catchpole, editor and writer for National Lampoon; Skye D'Aureous (Durk Pearson), MIT graduate with a triple major in physics, biology, and psychology and co-publisher of The Libertarian Connection; Natalee Hall (Sandy Shaw), co-publisher of The Libertarian Connection; Willis E. Stone, founder and chairman of the Liberty Amendment Committee; William Harold Hutt, author and Austro-classical English economist noted for his early work in opposition to South African apartheid; Harold Demsetz, University of Chicago economist; Leon Kaspersky, co-founder of the underground libertarian newspaper Protos; Filthy Pierre (Erwin S. Strauss), author, "filk" musician, and science fiction convention organizer; John Haag, co-founder of the California Peace and Freedom Party; Richard Grant, author of The Incredible Bread Machine; Stan Kohl, war resister advocate; Randy Ericson; Bill Colson; Don Meinshausen, former YAF activist and a founder of the New Jersey Libertarian Alliance.

According to an article in the USC's Daily Trojan, "the California Libertarian Alliance, also cosponsor of the conference, states, 'The purpose of the conference is to unite libertarians and anarchists who have been active in the right wing and the new left, to find a means by which they can work together, without misunderstanding or antagonism.'"

The main organizers for the Left-Right Festival of Mind Liberation were Dana Rohrabacher, Bill "Shawn" Steel, and Gene Berkman. Steel also emceed. Action Coalition for Freedom (Don Franzen) and the California Libertarian Alliance sponsored the event.

== The Festival of Liberation (1970) ==
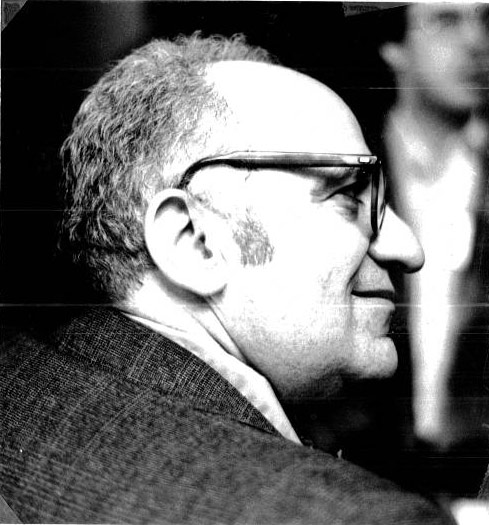
Professor Murray Rothbard

The Annual Festival of Liberation, as it was now being called, attracted over 700 attendees to the University of Southern California (USC) from November 14 to 15, 1970, "to promote alternatives to authoritarianism and statism." City editor of the USC Daily Trojan, Linda Bieber, stated that the festival would "focus on the idea of knocking out oppressive and authoritarian cultures by libertarian social revolution and the idea that violent revolution will not eliminate the authoritarians, but instead will trade them in for newer models."

The conference featured the following speakers:

Paul Goodman, social critic, pacifist, left anarchist and author of Growing Up Absurd; Murray Rothbard, anarcho-capitalist and professor of economics at Brooklyn Polytechnic; Thomas Szasz, professor of psychiatry from the State University of New York at Syracuse; Phillip Abbott Luce, a defector from the pro-red Chinese Progressive Labor Movement in 1964, author of Road to Revolution; Joel Fort, University of California Berkeley professor, physician and author; Robert LeFevre, radio personality, author and founder of Rampart College; Skye D'Aureous (Durk Pearson), MIT graduate with a triple major in physics, biology, and psychology and cybernetics specialist; Leiflumen, education expert; Dana Rohrabacher, the student field representative for Rampart College; Robert Love, president of the Love Box company.

Moderator Lowell Ponte was a freelance writer and contributing editor to USC's Daily Trojan, and freelance writer and KPFK-FM radio talk show host. Commenting about the conference, Ponte wrote in the Daily Trojan "...Important as a basis for agreement was a mutual fear of the expanding power of government and the threat to individual liberty it represents. In some cases this fear envisions government, with its manipulative technologies now under development, as an incipient Brave New World."

Workshop sessions were conducted by the Institute for the Study of Non-Violence, founded by singer Joan Baez; the Center for the Study of Democratic Institutions; and the Portola Institute.

Movie night included James Stewart's "Shenandoah."

Rampart College, California Libertarian Alliance, and Action Coalition for Freedom sponsored 1970's Festival of Liberation.

== Symposium on Political Implications of Modern Psychology (1972) ==
This conference was produced at USC's Town and Gown Foyer, February 12–13, 1972. According to the Daily Trojan, the topics included "the similarities between the humanist and the libertarian, the authoritarian personality, the state and the individualist behavior, political authoritarianism, and the need for self-respect".

The symposium featured the following speakers:

Dr. Nathaniel Branden, author, psychotherapist and former associate of novelist Ayn Rand; Robert LeFevre, author, TV/radio broadcaster and founder of Rampart College; George Bach, a clinical psychologist; Carl Faber, UCLA psychology professor; David Harris, draft resister and author of Goliath; Don Lewis, psychology professor; Alan Ross, psychology professor; Everett Shostrom, psychologist and author of Man the Manipulator; Roy Childs, libertarian essayist and writer of the influential essay "An Open Letter to Ayn Rand"; Carl Rogers, author of "Freedom to Learn: A View of What Education Might Become" and one of the founders of the humanistic approach to psychology.

Psychology Professor Alan Ross debated Don Lewis, chairman of the Psychology Department at USC, on "humanist vs. behaviorist" theories.

1972's Symposium on Political Implications of Modern Psychology was sponsored by the California Libertarian Alliance.

== The Future of Victimless Crimes (1973) ==
The Future of Victimless Crimes was held at USC in February 1973. Featured speakers included the following:

Thomas Szasz, psychiatrist and author of The Myth of Mental Illness; Nathaniel Branden, author and psychotherapist, known for his work in the psychology of self-esteem; John Hospers, USC philosophy professor; Robert LeFevre, author, TV/radio broadcaster and founder of Rampart College; Los Angeles Police Chief Tom Redden, who, despite his conservative persona, spoke in support of lessening pot penalties; Sheriff of San Francisco Richard D. Hongisto "told the more than 500 people in attendance that police are ignoring enforcement and protection from violent crimes in order to go after easy drug bust arrests."

== The Future of Freedom Conference (1977) ==
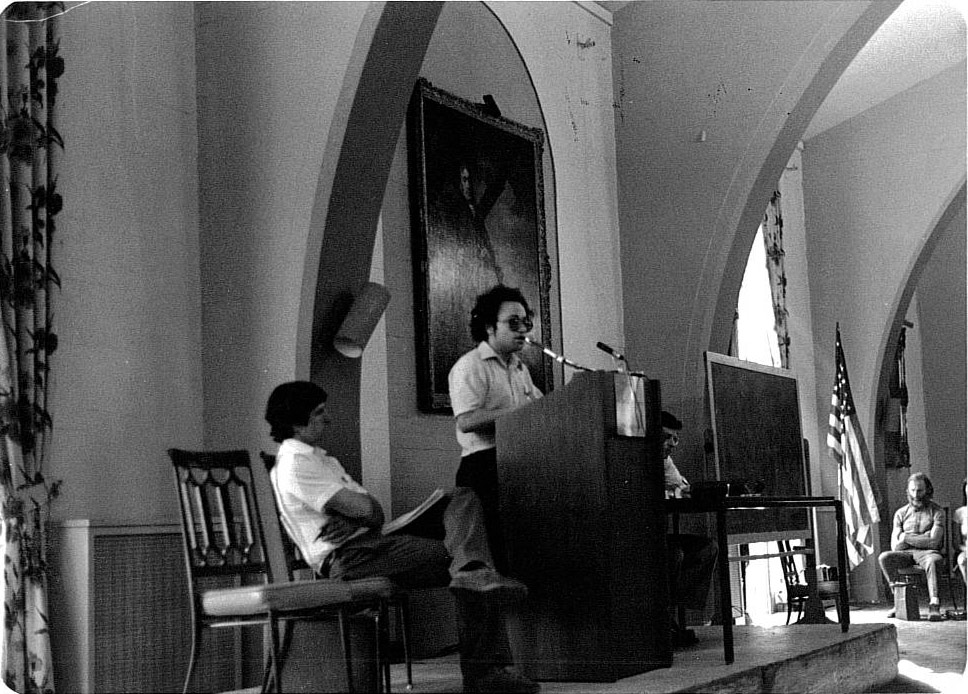
Debate between David Friedman and Tom Hayden

The first event actually named Future of Freedom Conference was held at USC in April 1977. It is best remembered for the turbulent debate between Prof. David Friedman, son of Milton Friedman, and SDS radical activist and later California state senator Tom Hayden. In an article by Joe Cobb from the August 1977 edition of Reason magazine, the topic of this legendary debate centered on "libertarianism versus socialism as the optimal means to achieve freedom." According to a 1980 Future of Freedom Conference brochure, "Tom Hayden was unaware of the libertarian philosophy. Mistaking Friedman for a conservative, Hayden attacked military spending and asked, 'What about the Pentagon?' Before Friedman could disagree, the audience roared "abolish the Pentagon! Shocked, Hayden paused and quietly responded 'Well, we must have a Pentagon.'" Hayden accused Friedman of unfair debate tactics. After a few hostile questions from the audience, Hayden walked off the stage, confused and shaken. "Amazingly, few persons when asked could agree on who won the debate. Hayden lost on substance, but Friedman's 'go for the throat' debate tactics backfired." Warren Olney IV, Channel 4 (NBC) newscaster, moderated the Friedman vs. Hayden debate.

Other speakers included the following: Pavel Litvinov, Soviet Union dissenter; Poul Anderson, science fiction author and winner of seven Hugo Awards and three Nebula Awards; Dr. Nathaniel Branden, author and psychotherapist; Jerome Tuccille, futurologist and author of It Usually Begins With Ayn Rand; John Hospers, USC philosophy professor and author of Libertarianism – A Political Philosophy for Tomorrow; Jack J. Matonis, tax-resistance attorney. Karl Bray, tax resister and one of the founders of the Libertarian Party (United States); Robert LeFevre, author, TV/radio broadcaster and founder of Rampart College; Hank Hohenstein, author and tax strategist; David Bergland, Libertarian vice-presidential candidate.

The California Libertarian Alliance sponsored 1977's Future of Freedom Conference.

== The Future of Freedom II: The 1980's: Freedom or Slavery? (1980) ==
The Future of Freedom II
- Abbreviation: FOFcon

Publication details
- History: April 19–20, 1980

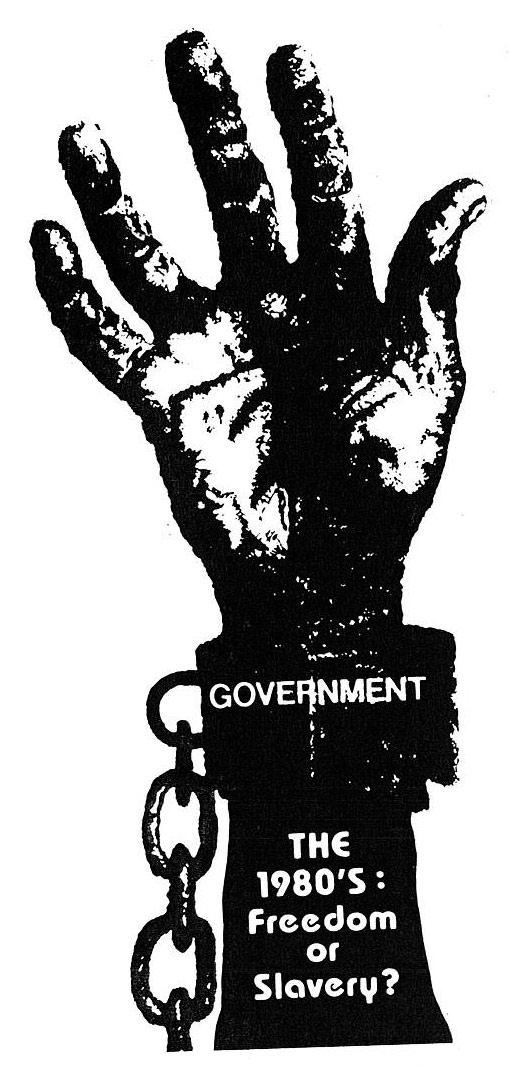

The Future of Freedom II: The 1980s: Freedom or Slavery was held at Cypress College April 19–20, 1980, with a banquet at the Buena Park Holiday Inn. Main speakers included the following:

Karl Hess, speechwriter for Senator Barry Goldwater, market anarchist, and author of Dear America; Robert Anton Wilson, author of the Illuminatus! trilogy; John Hospers, USC philosophy professor; Prof. Arthur B. Laffer, economist and originator of the "Laffer Curve"; John Matonis, tax-resistance attorney; J. Neil Schulman, science fiction writer of Alongside Night; David Bergland, attorney and vice presidential candidate in 1976 on the Libertarian Party ticket; Anthony Hargis, author and business entrepreneur; John Pugsley, investment advisor and author of best-seller Common Sense Economics; Linda Abrams, constitutional attorney and member of the Rampart Institute board; Prof. Bob McGinley, alternative lifestyles psychologist; Sandy Shakocius (a.k.a. Sandy Shaw), life-extensionist and biochemist; Shawn Steel, a founder of the Future of Freedom Conference Series; Carl Nicolai, electronics designer and inventor; Kenneth Grubbs, Jr., editorial editor of The Register in Orange County, and Janice Allen, Libertarian Party activist, emceed the event.

The Saturday banquet paid tribute to libertarian pacifist, author, TV/radio broadcaster, and founder of Rampart College, Robert LeFevre, who received the Future of Freedom Award. Another award, the Ludwig von Mises Merit of Honor Award was presented to Dana Rohrabacher, one of the early organizers of the Future of Freedom Conference series.

A film festival included For a New Liberty, Libra, The Inflation File, and Theo Kamecke directed The Incredible Bread Machine.

Debates pitted notable opposites, including the following:

Lowell Ponte, radio commentator and book reviewer for the Los Angeles Times, debated Jon Wiener, left-leaning history professor. George H. Smith, author, Objectivist and atheist debated Jeffrey Johnson, conservative Catholic. Samuel Konkin III, author, agorist and market anarchist debated Manny Klausner, attorney and Libertarian Party leader.

1980's The Future of Freedom II: The 1980s: Freedom or Slavery? conference was organized by Lawrence Samuels, founder of Society for Libertarian Life, president of Rampart Institute and owner of Athena Graphics, plus Jane Heider-Samuels, board member of Rampart Institute; and Howard Hinman, editor of Society for Libertarian Life newsletter Libertas Review: A Journal of Peace and Liberty. The conference was sponsor by the Society for Libertarian Life, Cypress College Libertarian Club, California Libertarian Alliance, and Society for Individual Liberty. Athena Graphics in Santa Ana provided the graphics.

== The FOF Conference: The Technology of Freedom (1981) ==
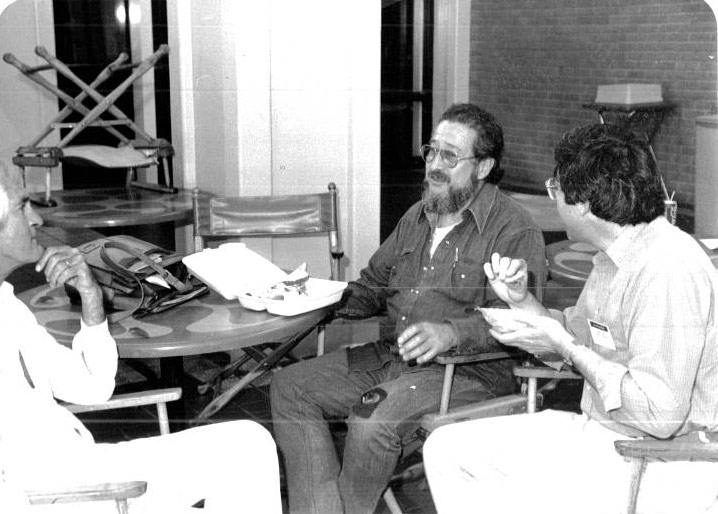
Center: Karl Hess, left: Timothy Leary

The Future of Freedom Conference: The Technology of Freedom, held at California State University, Long Beach (CSULB student union and Soroptimist House) May 8–10, 1981, drew an estimated crowd of 500. Main speakers included the following:

Karl Hess, speechwriter for Senator Barry Goldwater and market anarchist; John Hospers, USC philosophy professor; Timothy Leary, psychologist, writer, advocate of psychedelic drugs and coauthor of The Psychedelic Experience; Robert LeFevre, author, TV/radio personality, founder of Rampart College and libertarian pacifist; Irwin Schiff, author, tax protester and author of The Biggest Con: How the Government Is Fleecing You; Dennis Brown, California Assemblyman (R-Los Alamitos); Frank E. Fortkamp, professor of educational administration; Prof. David Friedman, anarcho-capitalist, physicist, economist and author of The Machinery of Freedom; Allan E. Harrison, author and educator; Samuel Edward Konkin III, agorist, market anarchist and author of New Libertarian Manifesto; John Joseph Matonis, tax-resistance attorney; Carl Nicolai, Electronic Engineer and inventor; Lowell Ponte, radio commentator and book reviewer for Los Angeles Times; Robert W. Poole, Jr., founder of the Reason Foundation; Fred Schnaubelt, San Diego city council member; Prof. Joyce Shulman, psychotherapist; Prof. Lee M. Shulman, clinical psychologist; George H. Smith, atheist, Objectivist and author of Atheism: The Case Against God; Shawn Steel, attorney and a founder of the Future of Freedom Conference.

Dr. Demento (Barry Hansen) performed as a conference highlight. Demento is famous for his KMET-syndicated radio show from Hollywood, California, "The Dr. Demento Show." A self-described libertarian, Dr. Demento specializes in broadcasting novelty songs, comedy, and strange or unusual recordings.

At the Friday night banquet, Lawrence Samuels, who co-managed the Future of Freedom Committee, presented the Future of Freedom Award to USC Philosophy Professor and the first U.S. presidential candidate for the Libertarian Party, John Hospers, for his achievements in promoting liberty. Co-founders of the Society for Individual Liberty, Don Ernsberger and Dave Walker, hosted a short color slide show of the early libertarian years dating back to the 1960s. Other speakers presented at the banquet, including the following:

Bill Susel; Robert Poole, Jr., editor-in-chief of Reason magazine; Shawn Steel, attorney; Manny Klausner, attorney and co-founder of the Reason Foundation; Leonard Liggio, president of the Institute for Humane Studies, classical liberal author and research professor.

On May 9 there was also a Society for Libertarian Life Reaffirming Liberty mini-convention in conjunction with the Future of Freedom Conference, with Robert LeFevre and Jack Matonis.

1981's The Future of Freedom Conference: The Technology of Freedom committee was co-managed by Lawrence Samuels and Kenneth Gregg; Terry Diamond was assistant manager, Jane Heider-Samuels was treasurer. Other staff included Kim Brogan-Grubbs, Howard Hinman, Pam Maltzman, Samuel Edward Konkin III, David Stevens, Charles Curley, Don Cormier, Bruce Dovner and Tim Blaine. The conference was sponsored by Rampart Institute and the California State University Long Beach (CSULB) Students for Rational Individualism, with co-sponsors Society for Libertarian Life, Society for Individual Liberty, Libertarian Supper Club of Orange County, First Libertarian Church of Los Angeles, and the Libertarian Law Council. Lawrence Samuels' Athena Graphics in Santa Ana provided graphics.

== The Future of Freedom Conference (1982) ==
Future of Freedom Conference 1982

1982's The Future of Freedom Conference was held at California State University, Long Beach (CSULB), and Long Beach Holiday Inn on October 1–3, 1982. Main speakers included the following:

Thomas Szasz, Professor of Psychiatry at the Upstate Medical Center in Syracuse and author of The Myth of Mental Illness; Doug Casey, best-selling author and economist; Robert LeFevre, author, TV/radio broadcaster and founder of Rampart College; Gary Hudson, aerospace engineer and designer of the Percheron 055, the first private space launcher in the U.S.; Jack Matonis, tax-resistance attorney; Wendy McElroy, author and individualist feminist; John Hospers, USC philosophy professor; Barbara Branden, author of The Passion of Ayn Rand; Jeff Riggenbach, journalist, author, and broadcaster; John Pugsley, author of Common Sense Economics; Dr. Nathaniel Branden, psychologist, psychotherapist, former associate of novelist Ayn Rand, and author of The Psychology of Self-Esteem; E. Devers Branden, researcher at the Biocentric Institute; Thomas Hazlett, economist and writer.

Roy Begley emceed.

There were two noteworthy debates. First, author, atheist, and Objectivist George H. Smith debated Thomas Bartman, president of the Los Angeles City Board of Education, on "Should Public Education be Abolished?" Second, Ph.D. Candidate in History at the University of Texas Jeffrey Rogers Hummel debated Prof. David Friedman, author of The Machinery of Freedom on "Should America have a Military Force for Defense?"

The Friday Night Banquet paid "Tribute to Dr. Nathaniel Branden." Presenters included David Bergland, attorney and Libertarian Party activist; Roger Callahan, psychologist; and Manny Klausner, attorney and co-founder of the Reason Foundation.

The Free Press Association (founded in 1981) presented the H.L. Mencken Awards, emceed by journalist, author, and broadcaster, Jeff Riggenbach. Presenters of the awards included the following:

Dyanne Peterson, associated with the Center of Libertarian Studies; Alan Bock, editorial writer of The Register; Wendy McElroy, contributing editor of the New Libertarian and libertarian feminist; Robert LeFevre, TV/radio broadcaster and founder of Rampart College; Christine Dorffi, free-lance journalist.

Author and psychotherapist Dr. Nathaniel Branden accepted the Roy Child's Mencken Award for Best Editorial, presented by Robert LeFevre.

1982's The Future of Freedom Conference committee was co-managed by Lawrence Samuels and Terry Diamond, with Treasurer Jane Heider-Samuels, and Advertising Director Melinda M. Hanson. Other committee members included Don Cormier, Bruce Dovner, Howard Hinman, Tom Jones and Pam Maltzman.

The conference was sponsored by CSULB Students for Rational Individualism and Rampart Institute, with co-sponsors Society for Libertarian Life, Society for Individual Liberty, Libertarian Supper Club of Orange County and the Libertarian Law Council. Graphics were provided by Lawrence Samuels' Athena Graphics in Santa Ana.

== The Future of Freedom Conference (1983) ==
Future of Freedom Conference 1982

1983's The Future of Freedom Conference was held at Long Beach City College and the Long Beach Holiday Inn on October 21–23, 1983. Main speakers included the following:

Barbara Branden, author of the forthcoming biography The Passion of Ayn Rand; Karl Hess, speechwriter for Senator Barry Goldwater and market anarchist; Irwin Schiff, tax resister and author of The Biggest Con: How the Government is Fleecing You; Butler D. Shaffer, Southwestern University law professor in Los Angeles; Henry Mark Holzer, constitutional lawyer and teacher at the Brooklyn Law School; Robert Poole, Jr., editor-in-chief of Reason magazine; Ben Sasway, the first draft resister jailed since the Vietnam War; George H. Smith, author, atheist, and Objectivist; Lee and Joyce Shulman, psychologists; Lowell Ponte, radio commentator and book reviewer for Los Angeles Times; Wendy McElroy, author of Freedom, Feminism and the State.

The conference was emceed by Tom Cobb and Mike Moon. One of the best-attended events was the panel on "The Nature of Justice" by three heavyweights of the libertarian movement:

Murray Rothbard, anarcho-capitalist and Professor of Economics at Brooklyn Polytechnic; Robert LeFevre, libertarian pacifist, founder of Rampart College and author of The Nature of Man and His Government; John Hospers, USC philosophy professor and first candidate to run for President on the Libertarian Party ticket.

Friday night's Freedom Film Festival, emceed by Tom Cobb, showed Ayn Rand's The Fountainhead, plus the Oscar-winning short film Karl Hess: Toward Liberty.

The Saturday Night Banquet paid A Tribute to Murray Rothbard. Rothbard, Professor of Economics at Brooklyn Polytechnic in New York and libertarian political theorist, was presented with the Future of Freedom Award. The banquet was emceed by Wendy McElroy and included the following presenters:

George H. Smith, author, atheist, and Objectivist; Jeffery Rogers Hummel, contributing editor of Free Texas and Ph.D. Candidate in History at the University of Texas; Dr. Jack High

Jeff Riggenbach emceed the H.L. Mencken Awards. Presenters of individual awards included the following:

Robert Poole, Jr., a founder of the Reason Foundation; L. Susan Brown, free-lance writer and staff member of the World Research Institute (later a professor of anthropology at Florida Atlantic University); Ken Grubbs, Jr., editorial editor of The Register in Orange County.

1983's The Future of Freedom Conference committee members were Lawrence Samuels, Jane Heider-Samuels, Melinda Hanson, and Terry Diamond. Dave Stevens was Floor manager. Staff included Rose Bittick, Peggy Nytes, Rod Boyer, Dean Steenson, Irene Shannon, Michael Kember, Tim Kuklinsky, Carol Moore, L.K. O'Neal, Dan Twedt, Sandy Sisson, David Anderson, John Robertson, Karen Dominguez, and Dave Klaus. Lawrence Samuels' Athena Graphics in Santa Ana provided graphics.

== The Future of Freedom Conference (1984) ==
The 12th Future of Freedom Conference (1984)

Held at the California State University, Long Beach on October 19–21, 1984, the keynote speaker was attorney and senior editor to Reason magazine Manny Klausner. Other speakers included:

Sandy Shaw, life-extensionist and biochemist; Jay Snelson, founder of the Free Market Society, lecturer and educator; Tibor Machan, professor of philosophy and author of The Pseudo-Science of B.F. Skinner; Barry Reid, founder of Eden Press; Leonard Liggio, research professor of law and one of the founders of the journal Left and Right: A Journal of Libertarian Thought; Edith Efron, New York Times Magazine journalist, correspondent for Time and Life magazine and author of The News Twisters; George H. Smith, author of Atheism: The Case Against God; Tom Hazlett, professor of economics at the University of California Davis; Robert LeFevre, author, radio/TV personality and libertarian pacifist; Bernard Siegan, distinguished professor of law and author of Land Use Without Zoning; John Hospers, USC philosophy professor and editor of The Monist (1982–1992); Jack Wheeler, freelance adventurer and philosophy professor.

Friday night's Tribute to Ayn Rand banquet featured two speakers honoring the famed novelist, philosopher, playwright, and screenwriter: Barbara Branden, writer and Ayn Rand confidante, and Ruth Beebe Hill, journalist and author of Hanta Yo. Objectivist and FOF Conference Co-manager Terry Diamond emceed.

The H. L. Mencken Awards were presented by the Free Press Association, emceed by journalist, author, and broadcaster Jeff Riggenbach. The following people presented the awards:

Michael Grossberg, arts reporter, theater critic and founder of the Free Press Association; Alan Bock, Orange County Register editorial writer; John Dentinger, contributor to Playboy and Reason magazines; Christine Dorffi, Reason magazine contributor

There was a Saturday night film festival starting with Monty Python's Life of Brian, hosted by author and singer-composer Craig Franklin, and Mike Hall, Hollywood film-maker and national Libertarian Party leader.

1984's The Future of Freedom Conference steering committee was co-managed by Lawrence Samuels and Terry Diamond, with Treasurer Jane Heider-Samuels, Charles Curley, Melinda Hanson, and Howard Hinman. Staffers included Dean Steenson, Bruce Dovner, Michael Kember, Dan Twedt, Sandy Sisson, Carol Moore, Dave Stevens, Tim Kuklinsky, Janis Hunter, Marje Spencer, and Caroline Roper-Deyo.

Rampart Institute, Society for Libertarian Life, and Cal State University, Long Beach Philosophy Association co-sponsored 1984's The Future of Freedom Conference. Lawrence Samuels' Athena Graphics in Santa Ana provided graphics.

== The Future of Freedom Conference (1985) ==
Future of Freedom Conference 1895

With science fiction author Ray Bradbury, who wrote Fahrenheit 451, highlighting the event, the 1985 FOF Conference was held at the Griswold Inn in Fullerton, California on Oct. 25, 26, 27 with "300 or so faithful libertarians.

Main speakers included the following:

Karl Hess, speechwriter for Senator Barry Goldwater and market anarchist; Jeff Riggenbach, journalist, author, and broadcaster; Scott McKeown, West Coast director of the Guardian Angels, a civilian crime-fighting group; Robert Poole, Jr., one of the founders and editor-in-chief of Reason magazine; Jeffery Roger Hummel, contributing editor of Free Texas and Ph.D. Candidate in History at the University of Texas; Linda Abrams, constitutional attorney and member of the Rampart Institute board; David Ramsay Steele, former member of the Socialist Party of Great Britain and co-founder of the Libertarian Alliance in England; Wendy McElroy, author and individualist feminist; Robert LeFevre, founder of Rampart college and author of The Nature of Man and His Government; Barry Reid, founder of Eden Press; Dr. Robert Simon, Assistant Director of Emergency Medicine Residency at the University of California at Los Angeles.

Debate: One of the most talked about events was a debate between a former member of the Socialist Party of Great Britain and co-founder of the Libertarian Alliance in England, David Ramsay Steele, and author, Objectivist, and atheist George H. Smith, on "Natural Rights: Do They Exist?" Moderated by the editorial-page editor of the Orange County Register, Alan Bock.

Saturday night's banquet featured the Future of Freedom Award: Tribute to Karl Hess. A former editor of Newsweek and speechwriter for Senator Barry Goldwater and Vice President Nixon, Hess authored the 1969 award-winning Playboy article, "The Death of Politics."

Presenters were Robert LeFevre, author of The Fundamentals of Liberty and Rampart College founder; John Pugsley, author of Common Sense Economics; and Alan Bock, editorial editor of the Orange County Register.

The H. L. Mencken Awards – once referred to by Robert LeFevre as the "Libertarian Academy Award Show" or the "Menckies," – were presented by Free Press Association, co-hosted by arts reporter, theater critic and founder of the Free Press Association Michael Grossberg, and by journalist, author, and broadcaster, Jeff Riggenbach. The winners were as follows:

David R. Henderson, Professor of Economics, Best News Story or Investigative Report for "The Myth of MITI"; Asa Barber, Best Feature Story or Essay for "Killing Us Softly With Their Song", published by Playboy magazine in 1984; Seymour Hersh, Best Book for The Price of Power: Kissinger in the Nixon White House, published by Summit Books; Sudha Shenoy, Best Editorial or Op-Ed Column for "Saving Wild Animals," distributed by the Institute for Human Studies.

The film festival included the following:

The Atomic Cafe; Ayn Rand's Last TV Interviews (Phil Donahue Show, 1979, and Tom Snyder's Tomorrow, (1980); Spartacus; Harry's War; Fahrenheit 451; The Scarecrow of Romney; Moscow on the Hudson; Rock N' Roll High School; Sleeper; Duck Soup; The Fountainhead; a documentary with short TV interviews of Robert Ringer, Tibor Machan, Murray Rothbard and Ed Clark; six episodes of the TV series The Hitchhiker's Guide to the Galaxy

Paul Jacob from Arkansas was scheduled to speak at the last-minute but had to cancel his speech. "Instead, he was convicted last July in federal court in Little Rock, Arkansas for failure to register with the Selective Service..." and "...was sentenced to six months in prison..." With a battered cassette player held high up to the microphone, conference manager Lawrence Samuels played the voice of draft resister Paul Jacob. The L.A. Times wrote that with the "shackled, outstretched hand-breaking the chain that had restrained it" (The Future of Freedom Conference logo) in the background, the "conference couldn't have asked for a more evocative image." The L.A. Times article also quoted Karl Hess definition of libertarianism as an ideology that simply states: "Thou shalt not aggress."

1985's The Future of Freedom Conference Steering Committee was Lawrence Samuels, manager; Michael Grossberg, banquet and workshop coordinator, Ken Royal, Terry Diamond, Jane Heider-Samuels, Charles Curley, Melinda Hanson, and Howard Hinman. Danny Tvedt and Dave Meleny video and audio taped the proceedings. Staffers included Michael Kimberly, Chris Hofland, Dagney Sharon, Marc Walozk, Linda Samuels, John Robertson, Sandra Lee, Sarah Foster, Tom Thomas and Henry and Rosemary Samuels. Rampart Institute and Society for Libertarian Life co-sponsored the conference, and Lawrence Samuels' Athena Graphics in Santa Ana provided graphics.

== The Future of Freedom Conference (1986) ==
Future of Freedom Conference 1986

1986's The Future of Freedom Conference was held at Pacific Hotel and Conference Center in Culver City, California, on November 7–9, 1986.

Speakers in Room 1 included the following:

Durk Pearson and Sandy Shaw, authors of Life Extension: A Practical Scientific Approach; Carol Moore, anti-war and war tax resistance activist; John Pugsley, author of best-seller Common Sense Economics and The Alpha Strategy: The Ultimate Plan of Financial Self-Defense for the Small Investor; Richard J. Maybury, author and economist; Vince Miller, founder of Libertarian International, later to become known as the International Society for Individual Liberty (ISIL); Fred Stitt, architect and editor of Guidelines newsletter; Richard B. Boddie, lawyer, adjunct professor in political science, and writer; Marshall Fritz, founder of Advocates for Self-Government and Alliance for the Separation of School and State; Alicia Clark, former national chair of the Libertarian Party; Jay Snelson, founder of the Free Market Society, lecturer and educator; Barbara Branden, a close confidant and author of The Passion of Ayn Rand; Prof. Joyce Shulman, psychotherapist; Prof. Lee M. Shulman, clinical psychologist; Kevin Cullinane, instructor for the Freedom Country seminars in South Carolina; Linda Abrams, constitutional attorney and member of the Rampart Institute board; Dr. Camille Castorina, associate professor of economics at Florida Institute of Technology; Charlotte Gerson.

The following people were members of a panel discussions on sex and freedom:

Norma Jean Almodovar, former policewoman turned prostitute and a sex workers activist; Richard B. Boddie, lawyer, adjunct professor in political science and writer; Jeffrey Rogers Hummel, contributing editor of Free Texas and Ph.D. Candidate in History at the University of Texas; Fred Stitt, architect and editor of Guidelines.

Friday night's banquet debate pitted President Reagan's senior speech writer Dana Rohrabacher against David Bergland, the 1984 Libertarian Party presidential candidate. The ensuing panel discussion on defense and foreign affairs included the following:

Kevin Cullinane, the instructor for the Freedom Country seminars in South Carolina; John Hospers, USC professor of philosophy; Robert Poole, Jr., one of the founders and editor-in-chief of Reason magazine; Jeffrey Rogers Hummel, contributing editor of Free Texas and Ph.D. Candidate in History at the University of Texas

Speakers in Room 2 included the following:

Jack Matonis, tax-resistance attorney and editor/publisher of The Newsletter for Citizens Strike; Ron Holland, financial expert, Austrian economist and author of The Threat to the Private Retirement System; Samuel E. Konkin III, agorist and market anarchist; Tonie Nathan, journalist, market consultant, and the first woman and first Jew to receive an electoral vote in a United States presidential election (1972); Tom Hazlett, professor of economics at UC Davis; John Hospers, USC philosophy professor and author of Libertarianism – A Political Philosophy for Tomorrow; Fred Stitt, architect and editor of Guidelines; Gary Hudson, aerospace engineer and designer of the Percheron 055, the first private space launcher in the U.S.; Walter Block, director of the Centre for the Study of Economics and Religion at the Fraser Institute in Canada and anarcho-libertarian theorist; Spencer H. MacCallum, social anthropologist, business consultant and author; Dennis Kamensky, Oakland Tribune columnist and author of Winning on Your Income Taxes; Mark A. Humphrey.

Panels in Room 2 included the following:

Are Religion and Libertarianism Compatible?

Alan Bock, Orange County Register editorial writer; John Yench, journalist for Freedom Newspaper, Inc.; Marshall Fritz, founder of Advocates for Self-Government and Alliance for the Separation of School and State; Butler D. Shaffer, Southwestern University law professor in Los Angeles; Robert Poole, editor-in-chief of Reason magazine and author of Cutting Back City Hall.

Another panel focused on doctors, lawyers, victims and the Justice System

Ed Clark, Harvard Law School graduate, Libertarian Party candidate for U.S. president in 1980 and author of A New Beginning; Charlotte Gerson, an anesthesiologist on the staff at St. Luke's Hospital in San Gabriel, CA; Don Eric Franzen, a partner in a Los Angeles law firm specializing in constitutional law; Lewis Coleman.

Jury Nullification and Pro Se: Freedom or Folly Attorney and Rampart Institute board member Dick Radford debated Bob Hallstrom, co-founder of the Barrister's Inn and sovereign citizen advocate.

Panel Presentations in Room 3 included the following:

Computers and Small Business Enterprises

Karl Hess, coordinator; Regina Liudzius, business litigation attorney; Jeff Riggenbach, journalist, author, and broadcaster; Alan Bock, Orange County Register editorial writer; John Dentinger, contributor to Playboy and Reason magazines; Jeffery Rogers Hummel, contributing editor of Free Texas and Ph.D. Candidate in History at the University of Texas; Don Ernsberger and David Walter, co-founders of Society for Individual Liberty; Shawn Steel, attorney; Bob Hallstrom, sovereign citizen advocate

Freeing the Terran Five Billion

Mark Eric Ely-Chaitelaine, a recent graduate from the University of Science and Philosophy in Virginia; Dagny Sharon, paralegal mediator; John Yench, journalist for Freedom Newspaper, Inc.; Chuck Hammill, Mensa member and author of From Crossbows to Cryptography: Thwarting the State Via Technology; Wayne Stimson

1986's The Future of Freedom Conference committee manager was Dagny Sharon, with assistance from Lawrence Samuels.

== The Summit87 and Future of Freedom Conference (1987) ==
Called the Summit87 & FOFCON, the conference was held at the Pacific Hotel in Culver City, California November 13–15, 1987. Main speakers included the following:

Marshal Fritz, founder/president of Advocates for Self-Government; David Bergland, law professor, attorney and author of Libertarianism in One Lesson; Barbara Branden, a close Rand confidante and author of The Passion of Ayn Rand; Peter Breggin, psychiatrist, novelist, and author of scientific books; L. Neil Smith, author of 13 science fiction novels, including The Probability Broach; Phillip Mitchel, author and clinical psychologist.

1987's Summit87 & FOF CON committee was managed by Marshall Fritz and sponsored by Advocates for Self-Government.

== The Future of Freedom and ISIL's 5th World Libertarian Conference (1990) ==
Sponsored by the International Society for Individual Liberty (ISIL), the conference was held in San Francisco August 10–14, 1990. The keynote speaker was the 1976 Nobel-winning economist Milton Friedman, who delivered a speech on libertarianism and humility titled Say 'No' to Intolerance, arguing that, "I have no right to coerce someone else, because I cannot be sure that I'm right and he is wrong." Texas Congressman Dr. Ron Paul was another speaker.

Other speakers included:

- Barbara Branden, a close Rand confidante and author of The Passion of Ayn Rand
- Leon Louw, author and twice a Nobel Peace Prize nominee for his work to end Apartheid and defuse racial conflict in South Africa
- Frances Kendall, co-author of two best-selling South African books
- Richard L. Stroup, free-market environmentalist, professor of economics and director of the Office of Policy Analysis at the Department of Interior during the Reagan administration
- Jane S. Shaw, journalist, environmentalist, and senior fellow of Property and Environment Research Center (PERC)
- Walter Block, director of the Centre for the Study of Economics and Religion at the Fraser Institute in Canada and anarcho-libertarian theorist and author of Defending the Undefendable
- John Baden, co-author of Managing the Common and founder of Foundation for Research on Economics and the Environment (FREE)
- Enrique Ghersi, Peruvian lawyer, professor, free market intellectual and a member of the Peruvian Parliament
- Carl I. Hagen, Norwegian Member of Parliament and Progress Party leader. During his speech he endorsed drug legalization. This became a problem in 1997 ween the labour press wrote about his speech. He disowned drug legalization in 1997.
- Petr Beckmann, scientist
- Marshall Fritz, founder of Advocates for Self-Government
- George H. Smith, historian and author of Atheism: The Case Against God
- Dr. Peter Breggin, psychiatrist
- Dr. Martin Krause, Argentine economist
- Leonard Liggio, president of the Institute for Humane Studies
- Robert Poole, privatization pioneer and founder of Reason Foundation
- Jonathan Marshall, journalist with the San Francisco Chronicle
- Robert Smith, environmental policy expert with Cato Institute
- Bruce Evoy, founder of the Libertarian Party of Canada
- Frank van Dun, law professor in the Netherlands
- Jason Alexander, author

1990's The Future of Freedom and ISIL's 5th World Libertarian Conference was organized by:

- Vince Miller, president and co-founder of ISIL
- Jim Elwood, vice president of ISIL
- James Peron, co-author of Liberty Reclaimed: A New Look at American Politics

Mr. Peron, the principal organizer of the event, says it was not associated with Future of Freedom other than as a sponsor, along with Advocates for Self-Government and the ISIL conference. It was billed as the World Freedom Conference. Peron says, "As principal organizer with Vince's help, I planned the event. While ISIL, FofF and Advocates were asked to help promote the event they had no actual stake in the event." There was a Future of Freedom conference at Fort Mason, San Francisco one year earlier, however, which is not mentioned above.

ISIL was formed in 1989 by the merger of the Society for Individual Liberty, founded in 1969 by Jarret Wollstein, Dave Walter and Don Ernsberger, and Libertarian International, co-founded by Vince Miller in 1980. After the acronym ISIL became associated with the Islamic State of Iraq and the Levant, the society adopted the name Liberty International.
