= California Libertarian Alliance =

Former political organization

The California Libertarian Alliance (CLA), a political advocacy organization, was founded in 1969. It was spearheaded by Dana Rohrabacher, Shawn Steel and supported by John Schurman, Dennis Turner, Ron Kimberling, Alan Bock, Gene Berkman, and other followers of the Libertarian Caucus after the defections and expulsions of radical libertarians resulting from the 1969 Young Americans for Freedom (YAF) convention in St. Louis, Missouri. Centered in Los Angeles, the CLA claimed to have over 1,000 members by 1970. Other sources put CLA membership at “more than twelve hundred members” by the end of 1969.

== After the YAF break ==
The breakout year for libertarians was 1969. After the traditionalist (trads) and libertarian (libs or rads) bifurcation at the 1969 YAF convention, many student libertarian alliances withdrew from the conservative ranks, joined or loosely associated with Society for Individual Liberty (SIL) or, in California, with the CLA. In particular, Dana Rohrabacher (“Johnny Grass-Seed”) and his cadre were instrumental in spreading the CLA and libertarian message, taking the role of libertarian troubadour, “seeding local LA’s with ex-YAFers.” Many libertarian leaders in California, including Rohrabacher, were also involved with SIL, since CLA was loosely-affiliated with the larger East coast organization.

During this time period, CLA leaders, radical libertarians and market anarchists were increasingly vocal in their repudiation of the conservative establishment, where Rohrabacher declared: “We recognize the fact that the U.S. in its economic and social manipulation of individuals’ lives and property, is reminiscent of the fascist tyrannies of the past.” CLA published an occasional newsletter called the California Libertarian Report, initially launched by Shawn Steel, which condemned YAF’s national office as “authoritarian” in its first post-YAF convention edition. They focused on organizing educational conferences, and developed libertarian activities on college campuses, predominately the University of Southern California.

== Left-right coalition and FOF Conferences ==
Determined to create a left-right coalition, Karl Hess, one of CLA’s supporters, prodded the organization to build alliances with the New Left. CLA decided that the advancement of a left-right fusion was best accomplished by sponsoring campus conferences that promoted politically diverse speakers. CLA was the driving force behind a number of early West coast libertarian conferences that included the February–March 1970 Left-Right Festival of Liberation, which attracted 500 students, and the November 1970 Festival of Liberation, which later became known as The Future of Freedom Conference (FOF) series. According to USC's Daily Trojan, the California Libertarian Alliance 1970 left-right conference was “to unite libertarians and anarchists who have been active in the right wing and the new left, to find a means by which they can work together, without misunderstanding or antagonism.'" CLA sponsored or co-sponsored libertarian conferences in 1972, 1973, 1977, and 1980, all located at Los Angeles or Orange County universities. By 1974, most of the CLA leaders signed over the duty and responsibility of the organization to Gene Berkman, who resided in Venice, California.

== Peace and Freedom Party factionalism ==
Under the influence of Gene Berkman, Eric Garris and Elizabeth Keathley, CLA continued to build left-right coalitions, taking leadership roles in the Peace and Freedom Party (PFP). CLA arranged for libertarian candidates to run on the PFP ticket in California, and sent a large group of delegates to the 1974 PFP convention in Sacramento. In the 1974 California Primary election, Elizabeth Keathley won a contested primary as the PFP gubernatorial candidate for the governor of California. But her candidacy was marred by socialist factions in the PFP who organized their own write-in alternative candidate. Keathley acknowledged this political infighting, remarking that “her heart belongs to the libertarian cause, exemplified by the California Libertarian Alliance, rather than to the Peace and Freedom Party. She received 75,000 votes in her run against Jerry Brown.

Two years later, the CLA libertarian faction abandoned the PFP, announcing at a July 13, 1976 press conference in Los Angeles that the PFP had become “dominated” by a “socialist faction” that gave the PFP the image of a “pro-communist organization.” During the press conference, Keathley announced that her defection was to protest “a dogmatic socialist minority within the PFP that favors more government rather than less government” and which “used manipulative and undemocratic procedures at meetings and conventions.” CLA endorsed the Libertarian Party and its 1976 presidential candidate Roger MacBride.
