= Behind the Badge =

Public safety news site

Behind the Badge is a website that provides news and feature stories from a public safety perspective, including crime, trends and features about public safety workers. Behind the Badge was formerly known as Behind the Badge OC, as it is based in Orange County, California.

== Purpose ==
The goal of Behind the Badge is to inform the public about the growing complexity and evolving standards of modern policing and firefighting. Behind the Badge has published more than 5,000 articles, columns and videos, reaching hundreds of millions of people, and has been picked up by local, regional and national media.

== Recognition ==
Behind the Badge has won 66 awards for writing, video and photography. Most recently, Behind the Badge won awards in the OC Press Club's 2025 contest.

Behind the Badge also received awards for its writing, multimedia, and photography from the OC Press Club's annual contests in 2024, 2023, 2021, 2020 (awarded during an online presentation), 2019, 2018, 2017, and 2016, all for work produced the previous year.

In August 2022, Behind the Badge was honored with a Certificate of Recognition from Congresswoman Michelle Steel for sharing stories about first responders.

The majority of funding for Behind the Badge comes from participating agencies. Behind the Badge is produced by Cornerstone Communications.
