= Derek Tran =

American lawyer and politician (born 1980)

- Trần Truyền Đức
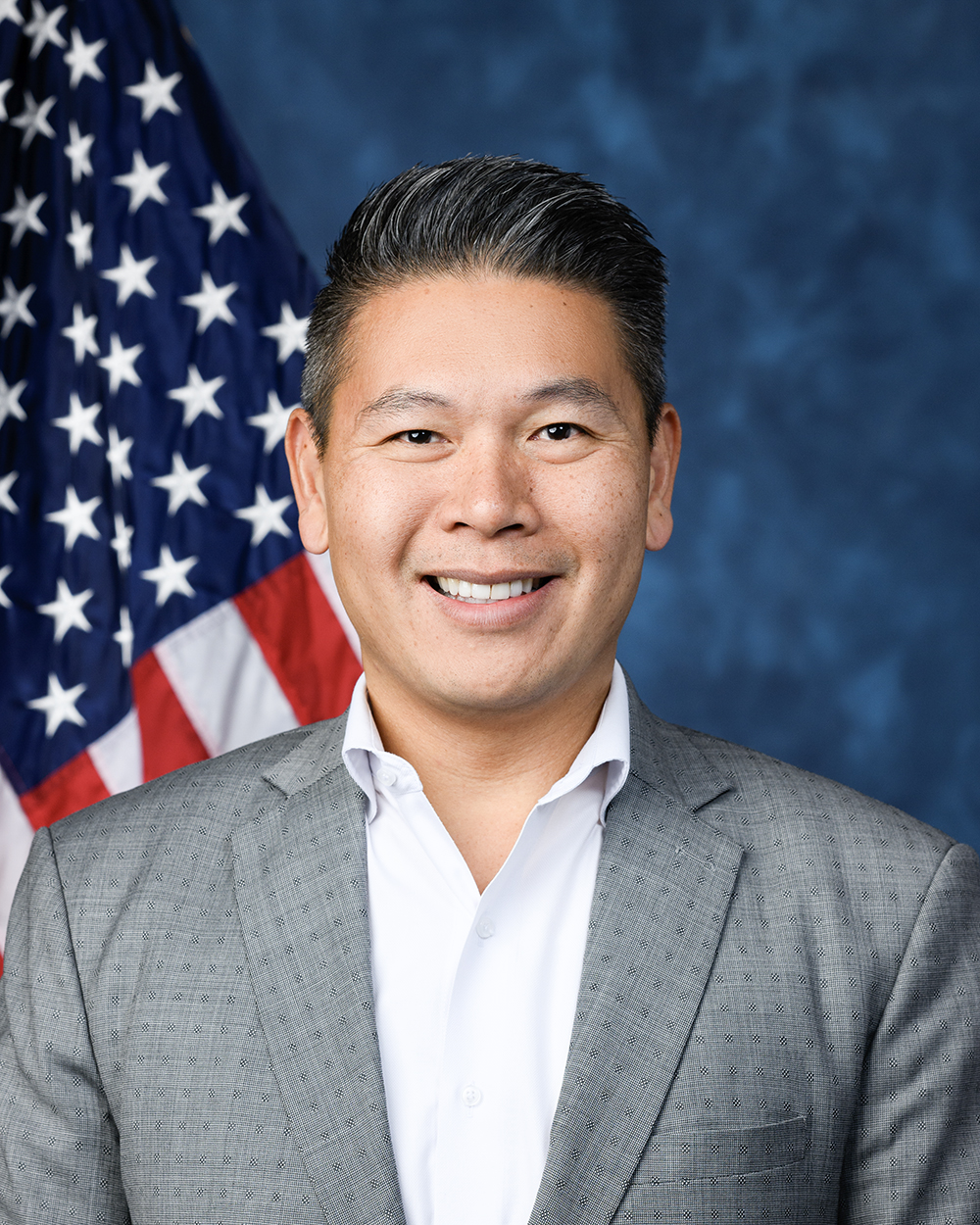
- Official portrait, 2025

Member of the U.S. House of Representatives from California's 45th district
- Incumbent
- Assumed office January 3, 2025
- Preceded by: Michelle Steel

Personal details
- Born: Trần Truyền Đức; December 22, 1980 (age 45) Los Angeles County, California, U.S.
- Party: Democratic
- Spouse: Michelle Nguyen
- Children: 3
- Education: Bentley University (BS); Glendale University (JD)
- Website: House website; Campaign website

Military service
- Branch/service: United States Army
- Years of service: 1998–2006
- Derek Tran's voice Tran recognizing Commander Vernon Jumper of the U.S. Navy and other veterans on Republic of Vietnam Armed Forces Day. Recorded July 14, 2025

Derek Truyen Tran (born Trần Truyền Đức; December 22, 1980) is an American lawyer and politician who has served as the U.S. representative from California's 45th congressional district since 2025. A member of the Democratic Party, Tran is the third Vietnamese American to be elected to Congress (Note: The first two were Joseph Cao of Louisiana and Stephanie Murphy of Florida.) and the first to represent California.

== Early life, military career, and education ==
Tran was born in Los Angeles County, California, on December 22, 1980. Tran grew up in the San Gabriel Valley as the son of Vietnamese refugees. His father fled Vietnam in 1975 after the fall of Saigon as a boat person. Their boat capsized, resulting in the deaths of his first wife and children. Later, his father returned to Vietnam and met Tran's mother. After living in a refugee camp for about a year, his parents immigrated to the U.S. and established a corner store.

Tran has stated that his family's reliance on government assistance, such as SNAP, WIC, and Section 8, inspired him to enlist in the United States Army when he turned 18 without telling his parents or friends. He spent eight years serving in the U.S. Army Reserve, including some time spent training at the Joint Forces Training Base in Los Alamitos. He also served as a cook in the Army. He was activated for Operations Noble Eagle and Enduring Freedom before receiving an honorable discharge. Afterward, Tran attended Bentley University, graduating with a B.S. and a J.D. from Glendale University College of Law. In 2012, he moved to Orange County, California.

== Career ==
Tran has worked as an attorney since 2014; in 2020, he founded his own law firm, the Tran Firm, in Huntington Beach. The now-defunct firm's website said it focused on personal injury and employment law. In 2023, Feher Law, a practice based in Torrance, acquired Tran's firm.

Tran has served on the board of the Consumer Attorneys Association of America and was appointed traffic commissioner for Orange. With his wife, he co-owns a pharmacy in Anaheim.

During the 2024 House election, Tran received criticism from his opponent, Michelle Steel, for previously supporting legal clients who had employment terminated due to workplace incidents such as sexual harassment, sexual assault, and hanging a noose.

== U.S. House of Representatives ==
=== Elections ===
==== 2024 ====
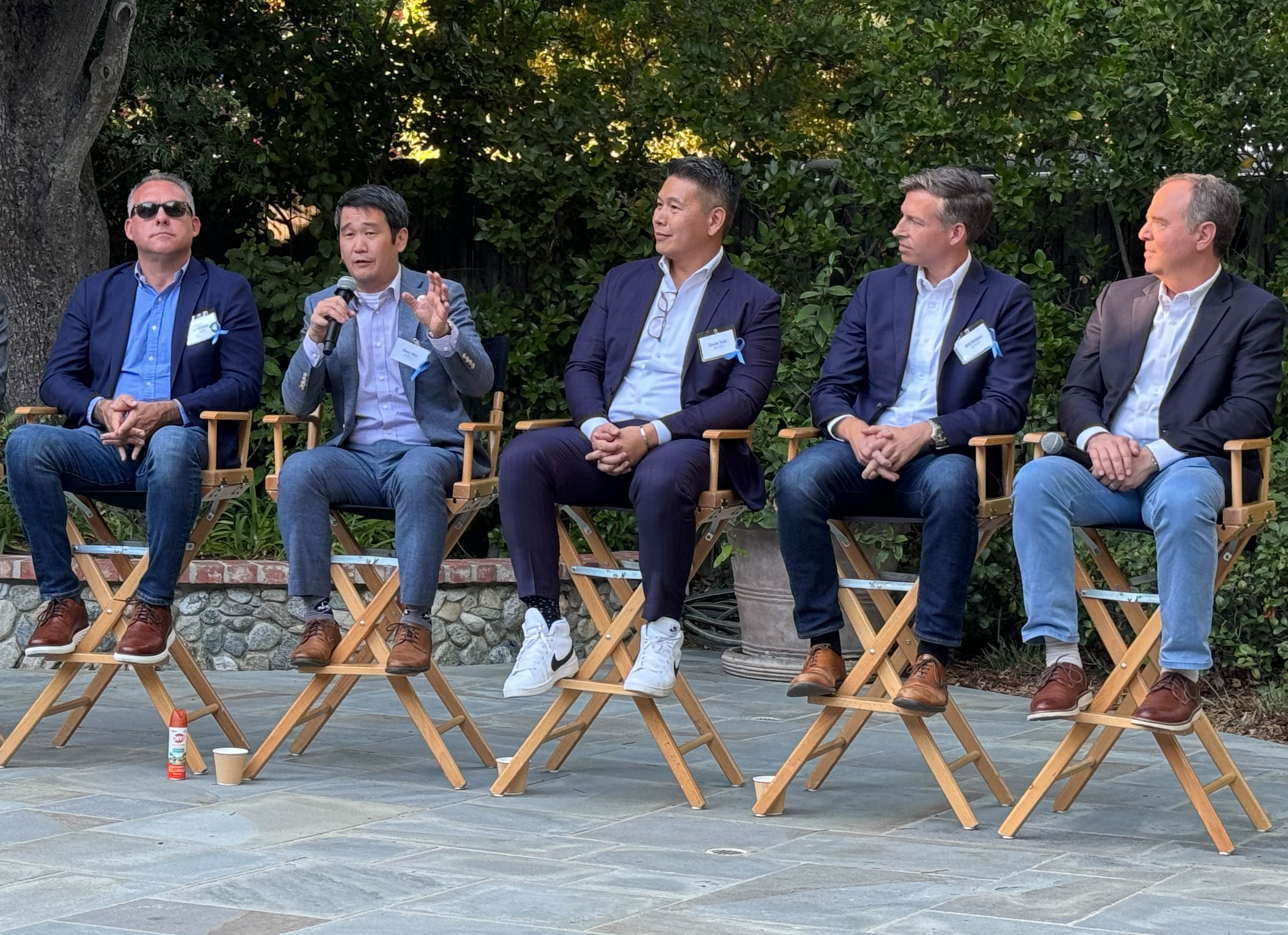
Tran (center) with fellow Democratic politicians Adam Gray, Dave Min, Will Rollins, and Adam Schiff in 2024.

At the end of 2023, Tran announced that he would enter the 2024 all-party "top two" primary in California's 45th congressional district. HuffPost reported that, unlike the other Democratic candidates who lacked financial support, Tran was a significant fundraiser according to FEC data. In March, 23 days after the primary, it was determined that Republican incumbent Michelle Steel finished first while Tran had placed second by finishing ahead of Kim Nguyen-Penaloza by 366 votes.

Steel was running for a third term in the competitive "battleground district". The majority-minority district encompasses parts of Los Angeles and Orange counties including the predominantly Vietnamese cities of Westminster, Fountain Valley, and Garden Grove in Little Saigon in addition to the predominantly Asian American communities of Artesia and Cerritos. Hence, Tran's campaign emphasized the centrality of his Vietnamese American identity to his bid. KABC, the Los Angeles ABC affiliate, reported that the district was 39% Asian.

Both Steel and Tran vied for support from the district's Vietnamese community. On October 19, Steel claimed to a Vietnamese TV station, VietFace TV, that she was "more Vietnamese than my opponent" due to a better understanding of the Vietnamese community. Tran challenged her claim of being more Vietnamese than a son of Vietnamese Americans, noting it was "insulting and disgraceful." Steel's campaign also rejected Tran's claims of proficiency in Vietnamese as a point of criticism, noting his usage of a translator; yet, The New York Times reported that some Vietnamese in Little Saigon felt any claims of fluency were irrelevant to Tran's Vietnamese identity. By the end of August, Tran admitted to the Los Angeles Times that he had lost his childhood fluency and had since spoken "broken Vietnamese". Tran's campaign provided a series of video clips in which Tran occasionally spoke Vietnamese on television.

The candidates exchanged accusations of communist sympathies, with some outlets identifying the remarks as red-baiting. Referencing a 2020 The Wall Street Journal report, Tran accused Steel's husband, Shawn Steel, of accepting bribes from the Chinese Communist Party in exchange for information, stating that Steel thus could not be trusted with political office in the United States. He called attention to Michelle Steel's personal loan of a million dollars to her own campaign, asserting this funding was "connected to her husband's dealings with Chinese Communist Party associates". Later, Tran drew controversy by asserting to Punchbowl News that unlike his family who were Vietnamese refugees after the fall of Saigon, Steel misleadingly presented herself as a refugee or victim of communism and instead immigrated "for economic gain." Subsequently, on October 22, the Los Angeles Times reported that Steel's campaign mailed campaign fliers associating Tran with Mao Zedong and the hammer and sickle, warning Tran intended to "take our country back to socialism". Following Tran's disclosure in August of holding cryptocurrencies, Steel also alleged in a mailer that, despite cryptocurrency being banned in China since 2021, Tran owned "thousands of dollars of cryptocurrency linked to China". Steel defended her accusations, asserting that it was provoked by Tran's earlier messaging involving her husband. The mutual accusations caused sixteen Asian American nonprofits to write to the Orange County chairs of both political parties that rhetoric that falsely implied Asian American candidates were "national security threats" should not be used by candidates since it could promote the false narrative of Asian Americans as perpetual foreigners.

The race drew national attention due to its competitiveness, ultimately becoming the most expensive House campaign in the country with at least $46 million spent. In October, Hakeem Jeffries stumped for Tran at a campaign event in Anaheim, stating that the race would be close. Later in the month, Bill Clinton also appeared in Orange County to campaign for Tran and Dave Min.

21 days after the election, Tran held a lead over Steel by 581 votes and had declared victory to LAist. The next day, when the lead had grown by 32 votes, Steel conceded the district's seat to Tran, and the Associated Press called the race for Tran. Altogether, Tran defeated Steel in the general election by just 653 votes out of the nearly 316,000 cast, making the race one of the closest in the 2024 election cycle.

==== 2026 ====
Proposition 50, a mid-decade redistricting measure approved by California voters in November 2025, redrew the state's congressional map for the 2026 elections. The reconfigured 45th district leaned slightly more Democratic, with 2% more Democratic voters and 3% less Republican ones.

On June 2, 2026, Tran successfully advanced to the general election after winning 53.8% of the vote in the "top-two" primary. The second-place finisher, Republican Chuong Vo, a former mayor and city councilmember of Cerritos, advanced to face Tran in the November 3 general election. The Democratic Congressional Campaign Committee placed Tran on its Frontline program for incumbents facing close reelection campaigns, and the National Republican Congressional Committee is targeting the seat. By late August 2026, forecasters began to move the contest as leaning towards Tran.

=== Tenure ===
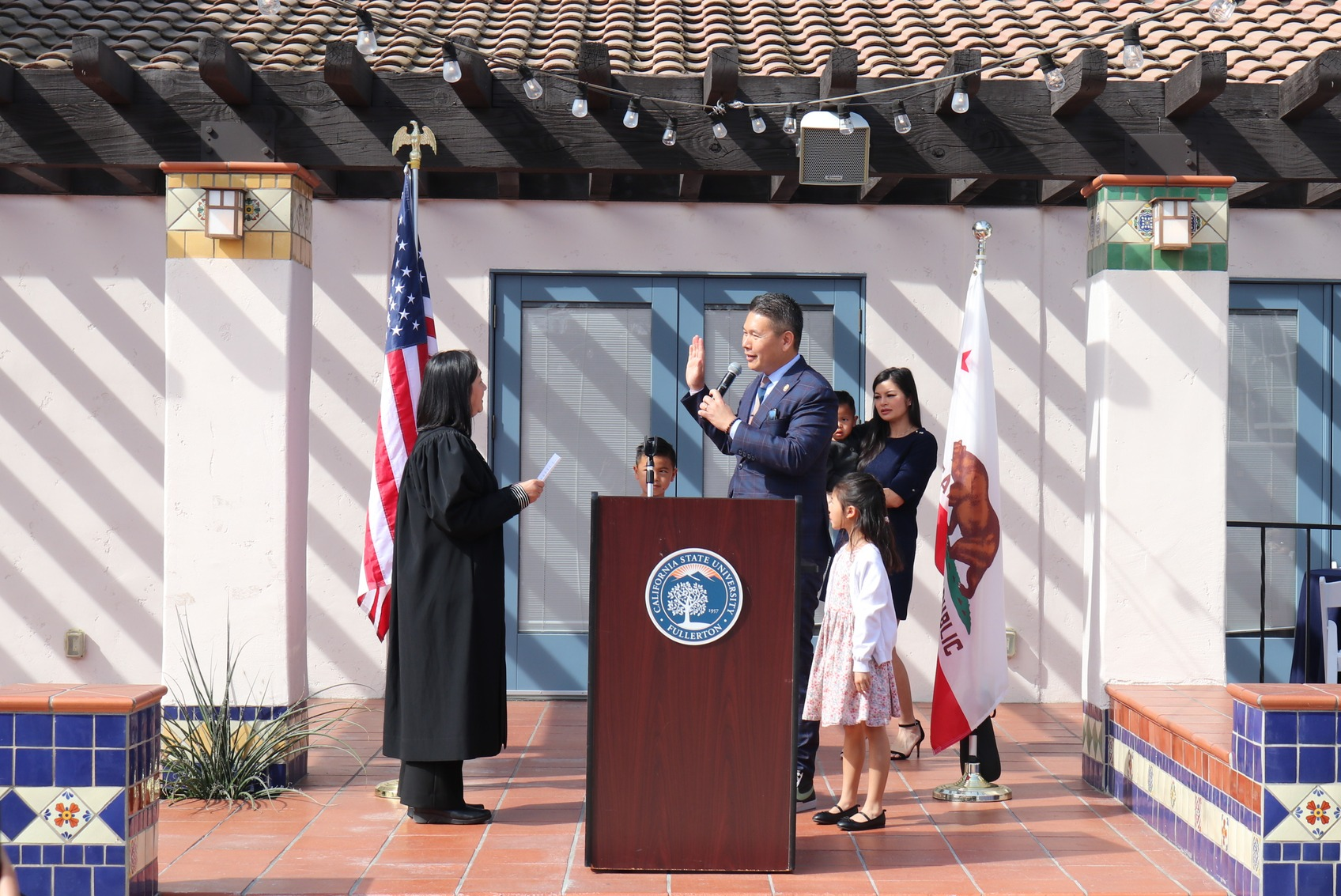
Tran's local district swearing-in ceremony to Congress, 2025

Tran was sworn into the 119th United States Congress on January 3, 2025, and appointed to the Committee on Armed Services and the Committee on Small Business.

Following the widescale federal layoffs by the Department of Government Efficiency (DOGE) in 2025, Tran introduced legislation that would reinstate veterans terminated without a reason. The Associated Press observed that while Tran's bill was unlikely to pass due to Republican control of the House, it exemplified "how Democrats are trying to harness public backlash to Trump's efforts to upend the federal government through the Department of Government Efficiency."

In May, Tran was chosen to co-lead the Democratic Party's congressional National Security Task Force alongside Jason Crow, Maggie Goodlander, and Mikie Sherrill. He regarded the Russo-Ukrainian war and the Chinese Communist Party, especially regarding the political status of Taiwan, as pressing issues related to national security.

In March 2026, Tran, alongside representatives Haley Stevens, Eric Sorensen, and Andrea Salinas, introduced the No Getting Rich in Congress Act, prohibiting members of Congress from buying and selling individual stocks.

In May 2026, Tran said that he and Robert Garcia had launched an investigation into GKN Aerospace regarding the Garden Grove chemical leak.

=== Committee assignments ===
For the 119th Congress:

- Committee on Armed Services
  - Subcommittee on Intelligence and Special Operations
  - Subcommittee on Readiness
- Committee on Small Business
  - Subcommittee on Contracting and Infrastructure
  - Subcommittee on Oversight, Investigations, and Regulations (Ranking Member)

=== Caucus memberships ===
- Community Health Center Caucus
- Congressional Army Caucus
- Congressional Asian Pacific American Caucus (Executive Board Member)
- Congressional Caucus on Vietnam (Co-Chair)
- Congressional Dads Caucus
- Congressional Equality Caucus
- Congressional Fire Service Caucus
- Congressional Law Enforcement Caucus
- Congressional Library of Congress Caucus
- Congressional Psychedelics Advancing Therapies Caucus
- Congressional Taiwan Caucus
- For Country Caucus
- Friends of Australia Congressional Caucus
- Fusion Energy Caucus
- Future Forum
- Gun Violence Prevention Task Force
- House Baltic Caucus
- House Democratic Caucus National Security Task Force (Co-Chair)
- Lowering Costs Caucus (Co-Chair)
- New Democrat Coalition
  - Economic Growth & Cost of Living Working Group
  - Immigration and Border Security Working Group
- Reproductive Freedom Caucus
- Sustainable Energy & Environment Coalition
- Youth ChalleNGe Caucus

== Political positions ==
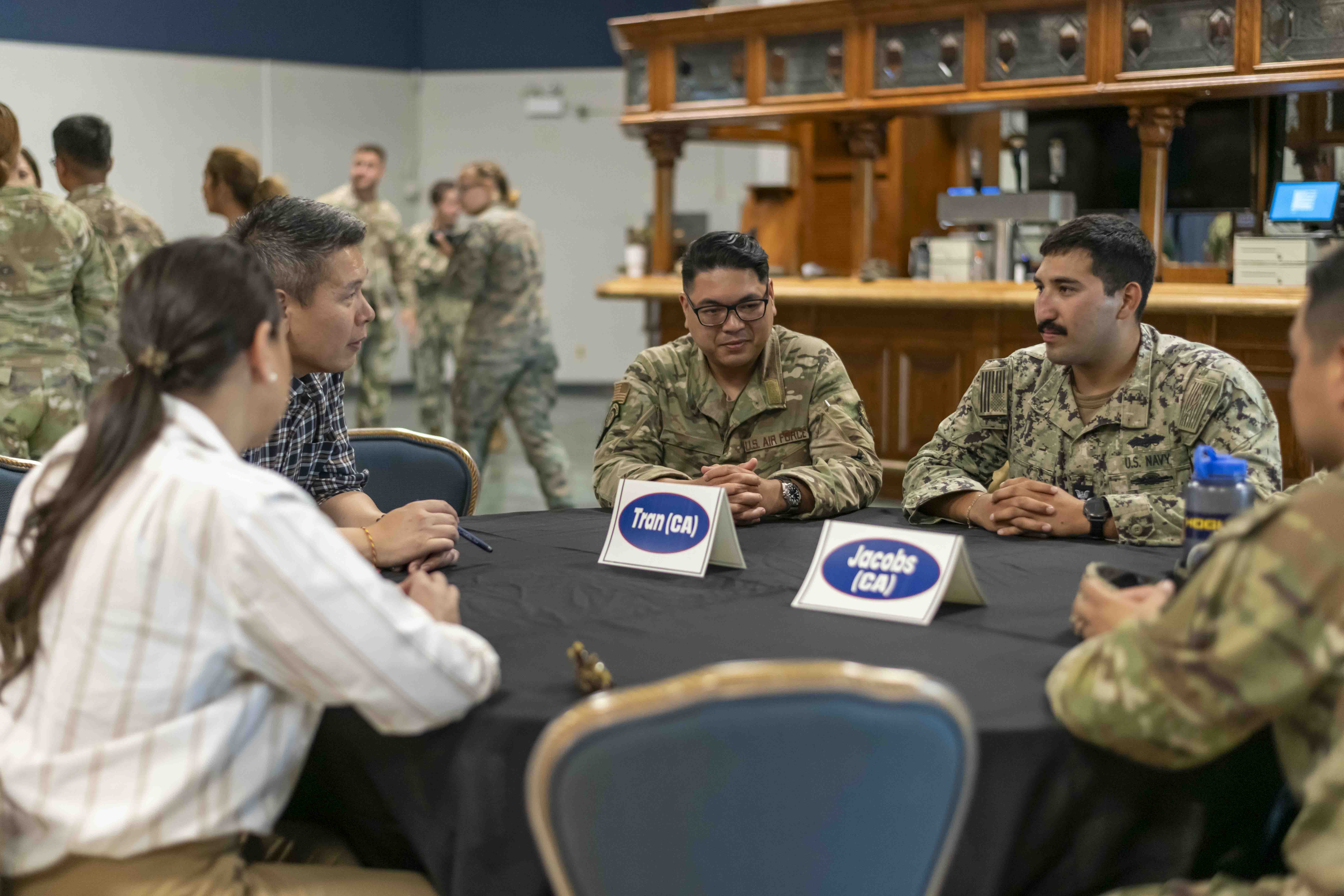
Sara Jacobs (left) and Tran meet with service members at Naval Station Guantanamo Bay.

=== Abortion ===
While campaigning, Tran considered abortion to be a "number one issue" in his district. He supported nationwide availability of fertility treatments such as to in vitro fertilization, claiming that fighting for reproductive rights was crucial. Tran also stated he would vote for abortion rights at the federal level and for funding Planned Parenthood.

=== Crime ===
During his 2024 campaign, Tran expressed support for 2024 California Proposition 36, known as "The Homelessness, Drug Addiction, and Theft Reduction Act".

=== Economic policy ===
He expressed support for protecting Medicare and Social Security. He also advocated for increasing federal funding for affordable housing initiatives by expanding the Low-Income Housing Tax Credit and building more housing units through public–private partnerships.

=== Immigration ===
Tran has criticized the Republican Party's stance on immigration, stating that mass deportations are inhumane. He advocated for comprehensive immigration reform such as prioritizing border security through technology and officer training, modernizing asylum procedures, and providing a path to citizenship for productive undocumented immigrants. He also stated that he would reintroduce the bipartisan border security bill. In 2025, Tran received attention as one of 46 House Democrats who broke from their party in voting for the Laken Riley Act, which enforced the detention of undocumented immigrants accused of theft-related crimes. Later, in June, the Vietnamese immigrant rights group VietRISE criticized Tran for voting for a resolution (Note: H.R. 488) that expressed gratitude to members of law enforcement, including ICE, instead of opposing ICE's presence in Little Saigon.

=== Judiciary ===
When asked about Joe Biden's proposed reforms to the U.S. Supreme Court, Tran suggested that justices should place their assets into blind trusts, be forbidden from accepting gifts, and be especially scrutinized for potential "partisan actions they or their family members may be engaged in." Ahead of the March primary in 2024, he derided Clarence Thomas's behavior around gifts as unacceptable. However, Tran conceded that he did not support an expansion of the courts but would rather impose term limits for justices.

=== National security ===
In March 2025, Tran split from his party and voted for a bill (Note: H.R. 1048) intended to curb foreign influences in American higher education, warning against the influence of the Chinese Communist Party in U.S. academic institutions.

== Personal life ==
Tran lives in the city of Orange with his wife, Michelle, and their three children. Tran is a Buddhist.

== Electoral history ==
US House election, 2024: California District 45
Primary election
Party	Candidate	Votes	%
Republican	Michelle Steel (incumbent)	78,022	54.90
Democratic	Derek Tran	22,546	15.86
Democratic	Kim Bernice Nguyen-Penaloza	22,179	15.61
Democratic	Cheyenne Hunt	11,973	8.42
Democratic	Aditya Pai	7,399	5.21
Total votes		142,119	100
General election
Democratic	Derek Tran	158,264	50.10
Republican	Michelle Steel (incumbent)	157,611	49.90
Total votes		315,875	100
Democratic gain from Republican			

US House election, 2026: California District 45
Primary election
Party	Candidate	Votes	%
Democratic	Derek Tran (incumbent)	86,184	53.76
Republican	Chuong Vo	24,591	15.34
Republican	Charlie Nguyen	18,846	11.76
Republican	Tom Vo	13,643	8.51
Republican	Mark Leonard	9,516	5.94
Republican	Amy Phan West	7,526	4.69
Total votes		160,306	100

== See also ==
- List of Asian Americans and Pacific Islands Americans in the United States Congress
- Asian Americans in politics

== Notes ==
U.S. House of Representatives
Preceded by Michelle Steel	Member of the U.S. House of Representatives from California's 45th congressional district 2025–present	Incumbent
U.S. order of precedence (ceremonial)
Preceded by David Taylor	United States representatives by seniority 420th	Succeeded by Eugene Vindman
