= Glendale University College of Law =

Law school in Glendale, California, United States

- Motto: Lux Veritas Lex, "Light, Truth, Law"
- Established: 1967; closed 2024
- School type: Private for-profit university law school
- Dean: Darrin Greitzer
- Location: Glendale, California, US; 34°8′56″N 118°14′44″W
- Enrollment: 250
- Faculty: 26 (Full-time and Adjunct)
- Bar pass rate: 21% (July 2023 1st time takers)
- Website: www.glendalelaw.edu

The Glendale University College of Law (GUCL) was a private, for-profit law school in Glendale, California. Founded in 1967, the school ceased operations in 2024. The school was accredited by the Committee of Bar Examiners of the California State Bar.

== History ==
GUCL was founded by Seymour Greitzer and Julius Alpheus Leetham in 1967 as the Glendale College of Law. The institution renamed itself Glendale University College of Law in 1975.

In July 2019, GUCL achieved a first-time pass rate of 64% exceeding ten ABA-accredited law schools in California. In October 2020, the first-time pass rate was at 62%.

GUCL was located in a two story brick building since 1970. The building was constructed in 1941 by Los Angeles County for use by the Health Department and as a County Courthouse.

== Academics and publications ==
GUCL conferred undergraduate (BS in law) and graduate (Juris Doctor) degrees in law. GUCL published the Glendale Law Review, a scholarly journal that was indexed in the Index of Legal Periodicals.

== People ==
=== Notable former faculty ===
- Stephen G. Larson, former United States District Court judge; adjunct assistant professor from 1997 to 2001
- James E. Rogan, former United States Congressman 105th and 106th Congresses and former United States Under Secretary of Commerce for Intellectual Property and Director of the United States Patent and Trademark Office from 2001 to 2004; adjunct professor of criminal law from 1988 to 1995

=== Notable alumni ===
- Patricia Morrow, former actress
- Derek Tran, Representative for California's 45th congressional district

== See also ==
- List of defunct law schools in the United States
