= Judy Mann =

American journalist

Judy Mann (December 24, 1943 in Washington, D.C. – July 8, 2005) was a correspondent for The Washington Post where she wrote about women, children, and the politics of the women's movement.

== Biography ==
Mann spent her childhood in Paris and was able to speak fluent French before returning to the US to go to high school. She graduated from Washington-Lee High School in Arlington. While still in high school, Mann worked for the Northern Virginia Sun where she was an assistant teen editor. Mann later obtained her degree from Barnard College. During her time here, she joined a group of students who traveled to Cuba, disobeying federal law of the United States. In 1966, Mann worked as a sales representative for Avon products. From 1968 to 1972, she worked as a reporter and editor for the Washington Daily News.

Mann was known for her liberal and feminist outlook and writings. She truly wanted to expand women's rights, which is why she put so much passion into her writing on this subject. She began working for The Post in 1972 as a city reporter and worked there for almost 30 years. She eventually worked her way up to becoming day city editor and finally a columnist in 1978.

Mann was married three times, the first two ending in divorce. Her first husband was Phillip Abbott Luce, with whom she had a son named Devin Mann. Her second husband was Jack Mann, with whom she had two children: Jeffery Mann and Katherine Mann. Her third husband was Richard Starnes, whom she married fifteen years prior to her death.

She died from breast cancer at the age of 61 at Desert Regional Medical Center in Palm Springs, California.

== Awards ==
Mann won many awards for her work on women's rights, population control, and child welfare from institutions including:

- Washington-Baltimore Newspaper Guild
- National Women's Political Caucus
- the National Abortion Rights Action League
- American Association of University Women.

American University gave her its Myra Sadker Equity Award; Planned Parenthood gave her the Margaret Sanger Award; and the Population Institute gave her its Global Media Award.

== Books ==
- Mann for All Seasons, 1990, Mastermedia Publishing Company, ISBN 0-942361-38-5
- The Difference: Growing Up Female in America, 1994, Warner Books, ISBN 0-446-67118-5
