= Phillip Abbott Luce =

American writer and organizer (1935–1998)

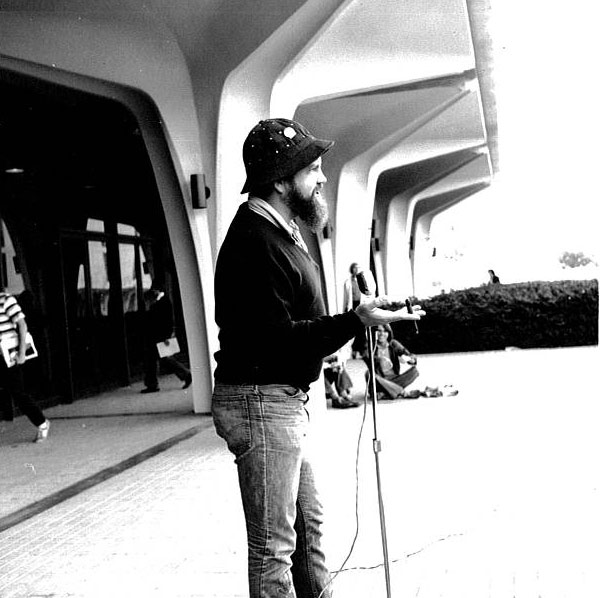
- Phillip Abbott Luce's speech at California State University, Fullerton (CSUF), March 22, 1974
- Born: October 17, 1935; Lancaster, Ohio, U.S.
- Died: December 9, 1998 (aged 63); Springfield, Ohio, U.S.
- Education: Mississippi State University (B.A., History); Ohio State University (M.A., Political Science)
- Occupations: Author and political activist
- Spouse(s): Judy Mann, Barbara Turner

Phillip Abbott Luce (October 17, 1935 – December 9, 1998) was an American author, lecturer and political organizer who had earlier taken leadership roles in communist organizations, mostly the pro-Red Chinese Progress Labor Movement (PLM), only to repudiate them by early 1965. He was indicted in 1963 as one of the main leaders and spokesman for an unauthorized trip to communist Cuba that arranged an audience with Fidel Castro and Che Guevara. He was later acquitted in a 1967 U.S. Supreme Court decision, which ruled that "Crimes are not to be created by inference." After his split from PLM, Luce became a leading campus activist in the conservative Young Americans for Freedom (YAF), gravitating towards libertarianism by 1970, speaking at the "Left-Right Festival of Liberation" conference in 1970, later known as part of the libertarian Future of Freedom Conference series.

== Biography ==
=== Background ===
His collegiate education began at Miami University, and later at Mississippi State University in the mid-1950s where he received a B.A. in history. Increasingly concerned over treatment of African Americans, Luce was kicked off the campus newspaper after criticizing the racist policies of the influential Mississippi White Citizens Councils. In 1958 he returned to Ohio and enrolled at Ohio State University and earned his master's degree in political science. His Master’s thesis studied the various racist-prone Mississippi Councils during the years of 1954 to 1958.

=== Communist years ===
In the fall of 1961, Luce resettled in New York City and eventually became an editor of the monthly journal Mainstream, operated by the Maoist-leaning Progressive Labor Movement that changed its name to the Progressive Labor Party (PLP) in the spring of 1965. He remarked that he joined the PLM "because I had a vision of the future and a hatred for the present." A little later he assumed editorship of Rights that was published under the Emergency Civil Liberties Committee and became chairman of Student Committee for Travel to Cuba by 1964 An organizer of the May 2nd Movement (M2M) antiwar protest in Times Square that resulted in forty-seven arrests in August 1964, Luce engaged in a project to secretly store guns in New York City just before and during 1964 Harlem riots, in hopes of "fomenting riots, all as part of bringing on an armed insurrection that would lead to a new American Civil War." Luce was involved in the training for a "future guerrilla operation" that included "target practice" sessions on Long Island.

Considering himself a "Fidelista" ever since the Cuban Revolution, Luce helped to organize the 1963 and 1964 illegal student trips to Communist Cuba where they met the top Cuban leaders, along with the Chinese Communist and Albanian delegation. As a result of their 1963 trip, 10 students and Luce were served subpoenas at the Idlewild Airport to testify before the House Committee on Un-American Activities (HUAC) on September 12 and 13, 1963. Describing the mood of the subpoenaed students at the hearing, Luce wrote: "We literally swaggered into the hearing room, determined to give the Committee a bad time." His trips to Cuba in defiance of State Department policies banning such travel led to his indictment in the District Court of the Eastern District of New York under Judge Zavatt, who ruled on April 15, 1966, that Luce "held a valid passport" and had "committed no crime." In 1967 the U.S. Supreme Court decided to review the lower court decision, which ruled under Justice Fortas that Luce or any other U.S. citizen travelling to Castro’s Cuba could not "violate a nonexistent criminal prohibition," thus affirming the District Court decision.

=== Break with the Progressive Labor Movement ===
Luce broke with the Progressive Labor Movement in 1965 over its rigid structure and harsh discipline, coming to the realization that they weren't talking about liberty for anyone, and that the PLM leaders were instead saying: "We want power so that we can control the country ourselves!" He made his defection publicly known by May 1965 in a Saturday Evening Post article entitled "Why I Quit the Extreme Left". In his 1966 book The New Left, Luce gave other reasons for leaving the PLM, disclosing that he refused to "be a part of a movement based on deceit and illegal activities" and that he could no longer associate with "people desirous of destroying individual initiative, character, and the future of the membership." In a 1967 Reader’s Digest article, Luce confessed that "I defected not because I was reconciled to the injustices of American society as I saw them, but because I realized that Communism would bring infinitely worse justice." Determined not only to disavow his previous association with Communists and New Left radicals, Luce continued to be politically active, challenging his former comrades in their own domain by participating in college speaking tours, writing books on New Left radicalism and networking with anti-communist organizations. He became a friendly witness and later a consultant to the House Committee on Un-American Activities. This inspired John Chamberlain to call Luce the "Whittaker Chambers of his generation."

=== Anti-Communist years ===
During his anti-communist years, Luce appeared frequently on television and radio, spoke on college campus across the country, wrote five books, penned articles for nationally known journals, and engaged in almost legendary debates with Tom Hayden and Jerry Rubin in his efforts to decry the radical Left. He joined Young Americans for Freedom (YAF), was appointed the full-time National College Director in 1969, and participated in campus speaking tours for local YAF chapters and conservative youth organizations. However, he relinquished his YAF position after six months.

He was editor for the bi-weekly Pink Sheet on the Left from 1971 to 1981, a Phillips Publications out of Washington, D.C. During the 1980s he founded and chaired the Americans for a Sound Foreign Policy, which was sued by atheist Madalyn Murray O'Hair in 1983 for the organization's claim that she sought to curtail U.S. military chaplain services, which she denied. Luce wrote for National Review, Human Events, Reason, The Saturday Evening Post, The New Guard (YAF), and The Libertarian Connection.

=== Books and publications ===
- This is Dedicated to the One I Love, (Poems), with Roger Taus, Cooper Union School of Art and Architecture, 1964
- The New Left: The Resurgence of Radicalism Among American Students, New York, NY David McKay Co., 1966
- Road to Revolution: Communist Guerilla Warfare in the U.S.A., San Diego, CA, Viewpoint Books, 1967
- The Intelligent Student’s Guide to Survival with Douglas Hyde, San Diego, CA, Viewpoint Books, 1968
- The New Left Today: America’s Trojan Horse, Washington D.C, Capitol Hill Press, 1971
- The New Imperialism: Cuba and the Soviets in Africa, Council for Inter-American Security, 1979, (70 pages)
- "The Phillip Luce-Karl Hess debate", The New Guard, Washington, D.C., 1970, (20 pages)
- Haiti, ready for revolution, Council for Inter-American Security, 1980, (34 pages)
