= The Incredible Bread Machine =

1966 text by R.W. Grant

The Incredible Bread Machine is a text of political commentary written by R.W. Grant in 1966, which discussed free market enterprise and capitalism.

The book had an accompanying poem entitled "Tom Smith and His Incredible Bread Machine." The poem is about Tom Smith, the inventor of a machine that produces bread very cheaply. Smith's cheap bread feeds the world and he becomes very wealthy from his invention. However, Smith's government charges him with conducting illegal business practices and the price of bread soars.

The poem was later reissued in an illustrated hardcover format. In 1999, the second edition of The Incredible Bread Machine was published.

In 1974, Susan Love Brown, Karl Keating, David Mellinger, Patrea Post, Stuart Smith and Catriona Tudor of World Research Inc. expanded upon the original book's content and wrote their own book, using the same title, promoting their own ideas of personal and economic freedom. In 1975, World Research expanded this book into a film featuring themselves. Theo Kamecke was director and cameraman for the film. The film is meant to be a commentary on capitalism.
