= Michelle Steel =

American diplomat and politician (born 1955)

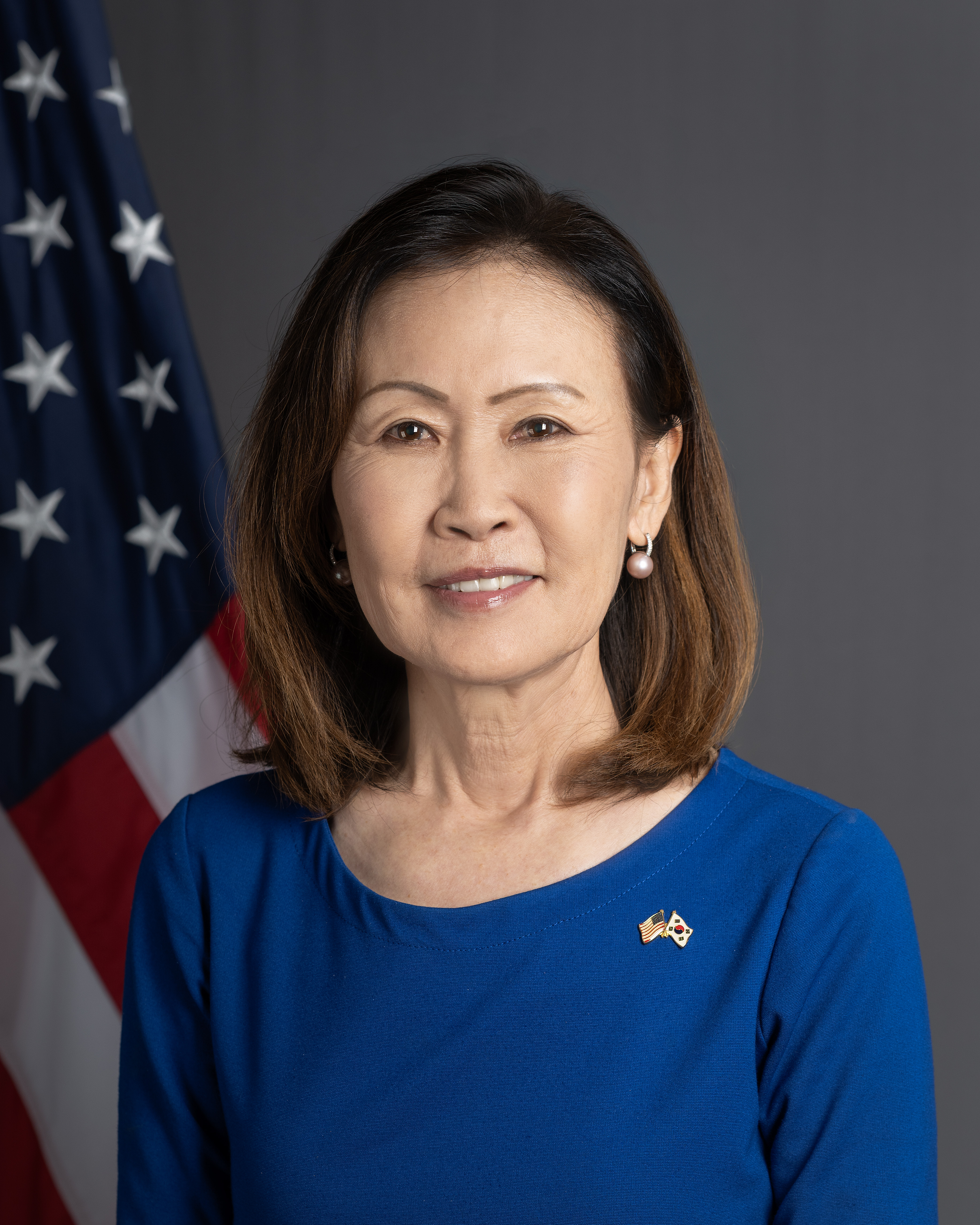
- Official portrait, 2026

United States Ambassador to South Korea
- Incumbent
- Assumed office August 12, 2026
- President: Donald Trump
- Preceded by: Philip S. Goldberg

Member of the U.S. House of Representatives from California
- In office January 3, 2021 – January 3, 2025
- Preceded by: Harley Rouda
- Succeeded by: Derek Tran
- Constituency: 48th district (2021–2023); 45th district (2023–2025)

Chair of the Orange County Board of Supervisors
- In office January 14, 2020 – January 3, 2021
- Preceded by: Lisa Bartlett
- Succeeded by: Andrew Do
- In office January 10, 2017 – January 9, 2018
- Preceded by: Lisa Bartlett
- Succeeded by: Andrew Do

Member of the Orange County Board of Supervisors from the 2nd district
- In office January 5, 2015 – January 3, 2021
- Preceded by: John Moorlach
- Succeeded by: Katrina Foley

Member of the California State Board of Equalization from the 3rd district
- In office January 5, 2007 – January 5, 2015
- Preceded by: Claude Parrish
- Succeeded by: Diane Harkey

Personal details
- Born: Michelle Eunjoo Park; June 21, 1955 (age 71) Seoul, South Korea
- Party: Republican
- Spouse: Shawn Steel (m. 1981)
- Children: 2
- Education: Pepperdine University (BA); University of Southern California (MBA)

Korean name
- Hangul: 박은주
- Hanja: 朴銀珠
- RR: Bak Eunju
- MR: Pak Ŭnju
- Steel's voice Steel commemorating the 35th anniversary of Little Saigon, Orange County. Recorded June 6, 2023

Michelle Eunjoo Steel (née Park, born June 21, 1955) is an American politician and diplomat who is the U.S. Ambassador to South Korea. Steel was nominated to the position on April 13, 2026 and confirmed by a 55–39 vote of the U.S. Senate on June 17, 2026.

She served as the U.S. representative for California's 45th congressional district from 2023 to 2025, previously representing the 48th congressional district from 2021 to 2023. Steel, fellow California Republican Young Kim and Washington Democrat Marilyn Strickland were the first Korean-American women to serve in Congress. A member of the Republican Party, she concurrently served as a member of House minority whip Steve Scalise's Whip Team for the 117th Congress. Steel ran for re-election to a third term in 2024, but she was defeated in the general election by Democratic challenger Derek Tran.

Steel served as the member of the Orange County Board of Supervisors from the 2nd district from 2015 to 2021 and of the California State Board of Equalization from the 3rd district from 2007 to 2015.

== Early life and education ==
Steel was born in Seoul, South Korea. Her father was born in Shanghai to Korean expatriate parents. Steel was educated in South Korea, Japan, and the United States. She holds a degree in business from Pepperdine University and an MBA from the University of Southern California. She speaks Korean, Japanese, and English.

== California politics ==
Steel has been active in Republican Party politics and served on various commissions in the George W. Bush administration.

=== California State Board of Equalization ===
Steel was elected to the California State Board of Equalization in 2006 when Republican incumbent Claude Parrish was term limited and ran unsuccessfully for state treasurer. Throughout her tenure, she served as the country's highest-ranking Korean American officeholder, and California's highest-ranking Republican woman. She represented more than eight million people in the 3rd district, which then included all of Imperial, Orange, Riverside and San Diego counties and parts of Los Angeles and San Bernardino counties. In 2011, she was elected vice chair of the Board of Equalization.

=== Orange County Board of Supervisors ===
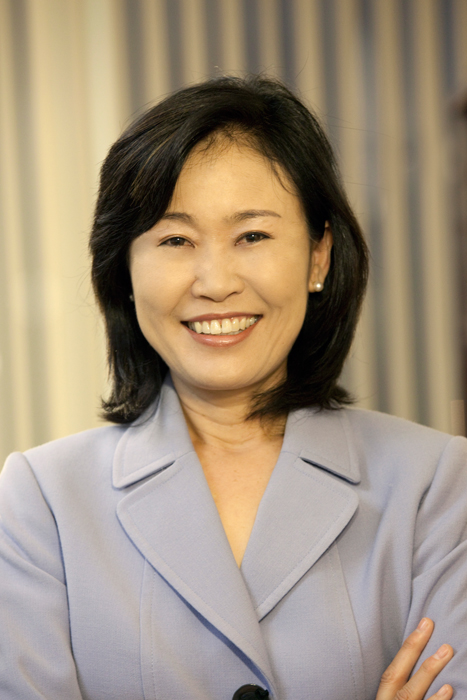
Steel during her tenure as Orange County Supervisor in 2014.

In 2014, Steel was elected to the Orange County Board of Supervisors representing the 2nd district, defeating state assemblyman Allan Mansoor.

In March 2018, Steel was the only elected official to greet President Donald Trump when he landed at LAX on his first official visit to California as president. In 2019, Trump appointed her to the President's Advisory Commission on Asian Americans and Pacific Islanders.

Steel chaired the Orange County Board of Supervisors in 2017 and again in 2020. During the COVID-19 pandemic, she opposed mandatory face masks in Orange County. She voted against requiring face coverings for retail employees and opposed mask mandates in public schools. She questioned masks' efficacy in preventing the virus spread.

On September 15, 2020, the Orange County Board of Supervisors approved plans that could lead to increased private jet traffic at John Wayne Airport. Steel was criticized by her Democratic opponent, Harley Rouda, for taking campaign contributions from ACI Jet, the corporation that was awarded the contract.

Steel and her husband Shawn supported the 2020–21 recall initiative against California governor Gavin Newsom and endorsed Larry Elder to replace him.

In 2024, Steel was criticized for her management of $1.2 million allocated for food aid during the 2020 COVID-19 pandemic. With funds from the federal government Coronavirus Aid, Relief, and Economic Security Act, each Supervisor contracted to provide meals for needy senior citizens in their district. Steel awarded the contract to a marketing company she was using for her campaign, a company that reportedly had no prior experience with this type of government funding. An audit revealed that the meals had been considerably more costly than in other Orange County districts.

== U.S. House of Representatives ==
=== Elections ===
==== 2020 ====
In 2020, Steel ran for the U.S. House of Representatives in California's 48th congressional district. She received 34.9% of the vote to advance from the primary and defeated incumbent Democrat Harley Rouda in the November 3 general election with 51.1% of the vote. Steel raised $200,000 more than Rouda.

During her campaign, Steel spoke out against COVID-19 mask mandates. Her platform included opposition to abortion, same-sex marriage, and the creation of a pathway to citizenship for undocumented immigrants. A conservative, she aligned herself with President Donald Trump.

==== 2022 ====
On December 23, 2021, Steel announced that she would run in California's 45th congressional district in 2022 due to redistricting. She was endorsed by Kevin McCarthy, Young Kim, Ken Calvert, Mimi Walters, Andrew Do, and the Republican Party of Orange County.

During the campaign, Steel faced protests over her campaign ads aiming to portray her Democratic rival, Naval reserve officer and Taiwanese American Jay Chen, as a Chinese Communist Party sympathizer. Steel defeated Democratic nominee Jay Chen in the November 8, 2022, general election.

==== 2024 ====
Steel ran for reelection in the district in 2024. During the campaign, Steel sought to characterize her Democratic opponent Derek Tran as a communist sympathizer by sending mailers of Tran alongside Mao Zedong and a hammer and sickle. Tran is a second-generation Vietnamese American. During the campaign, Steel, who is Korean-born, said "I am more Vietnamese than my opponent." Tran defeated Steel in the November 5, 2024, general election.

=== Tenure ===
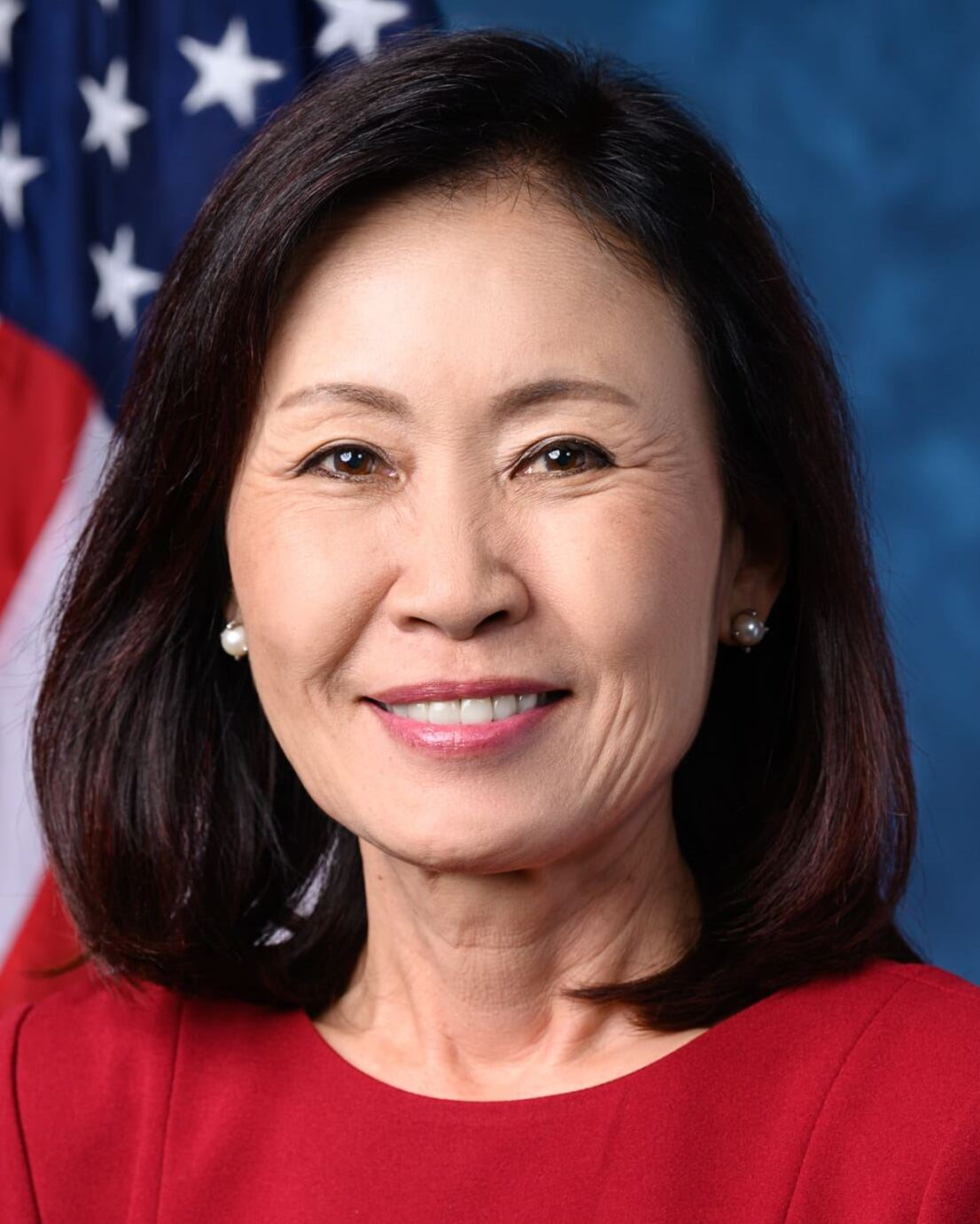
Official Congressional portrait, 2020.

Along with several other Republican U.S. House freshmen, Steel was a member of the Freedom Force, an informal group styled as a Republican counterpart to the Democratic group The Squad. Steel tested positive for COVID-19 in January 2021. She referenced her own mild symptoms from her bout with COVID to advocate for opening up schools and businesses.

Steel did not vote on the certification of Joe Biden's Electoral College victory. She voted against the second impeachment of Donald Trump on January 13, 2021. In early February 2021, Steel called for the reopening of schools in California. On February 25, 2021, Steel voted against the Equality Act, a bill that would prohibit discrimination based on gender identity and sexual orientation by amending the Civil Rights Act of 1964 and the Fair Housing Act to explicitly include new protections. On February 27, 2021, Steel voted against the American Rescue Plan Act of 2021, a $1.9 trillion COVID-19 relief and stimulus bill.

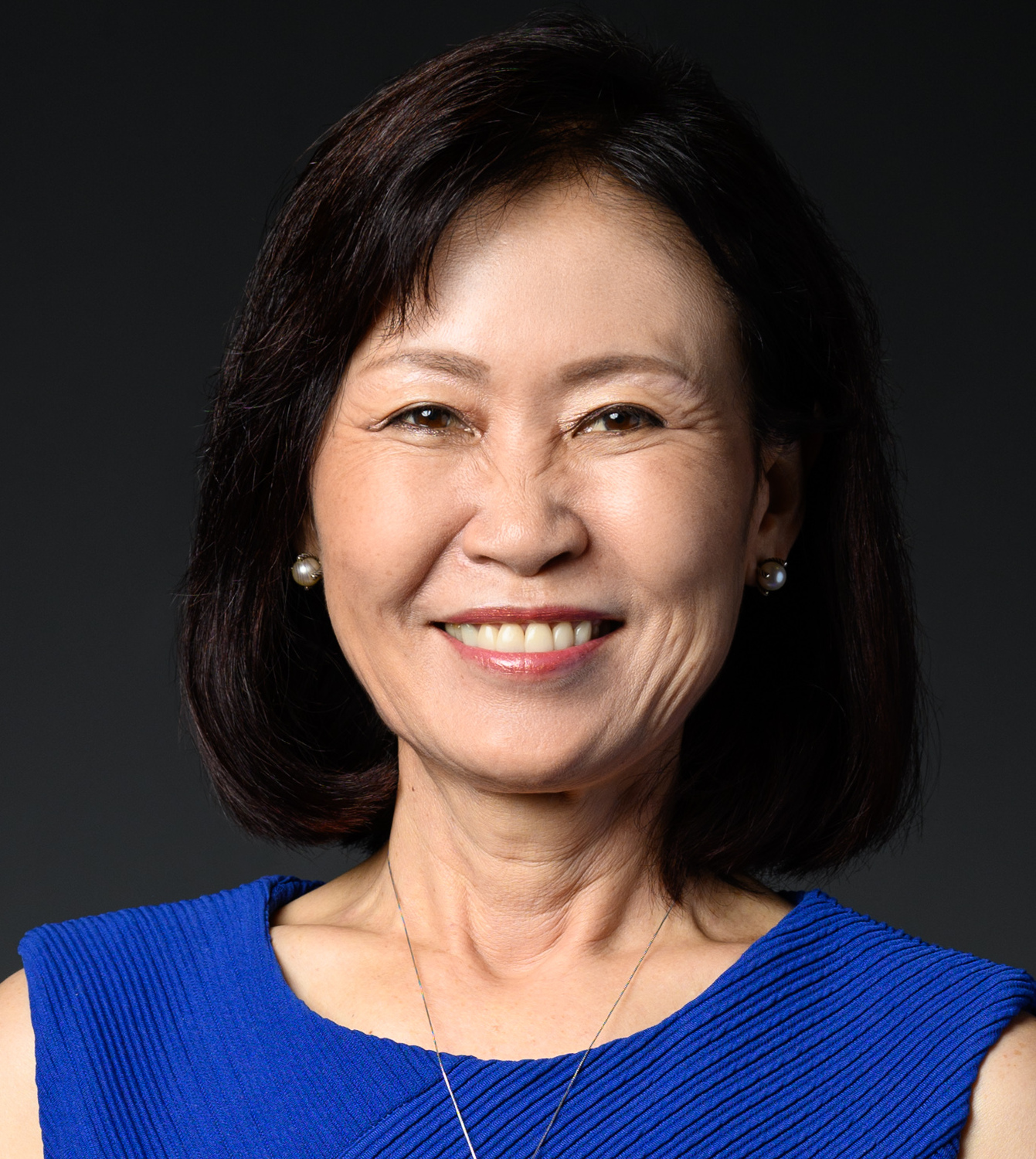
Portrait of Steel during the 117th United States Congress.

In March 2021, Steel introduced a bill that would block federal funding from being used to support California's high-speed rail project, which she called a "failure." In June 2021, Steel was one of 49 House Republicans to vote to repeal the AUMF against Iraq. In 2021, Steel joined a majority of Republican representatives in signing onto an amicus brief to overturn Roe v. Wade.

In July 2022, Steel voted against the Respect for Marriage Act, which requires the U.S. federal government to recognize the validity of same-sex marriages. As of December 2022, Steel had voted in line with President Joe Biden's stated position 21% of the time. In September 2023, Steel was among a bipartisan group of eight U.S. House members who co-sponsored a mental health focused bill aimed at integrating behavioral health services for Medicare beneficiaries in primary care settings.

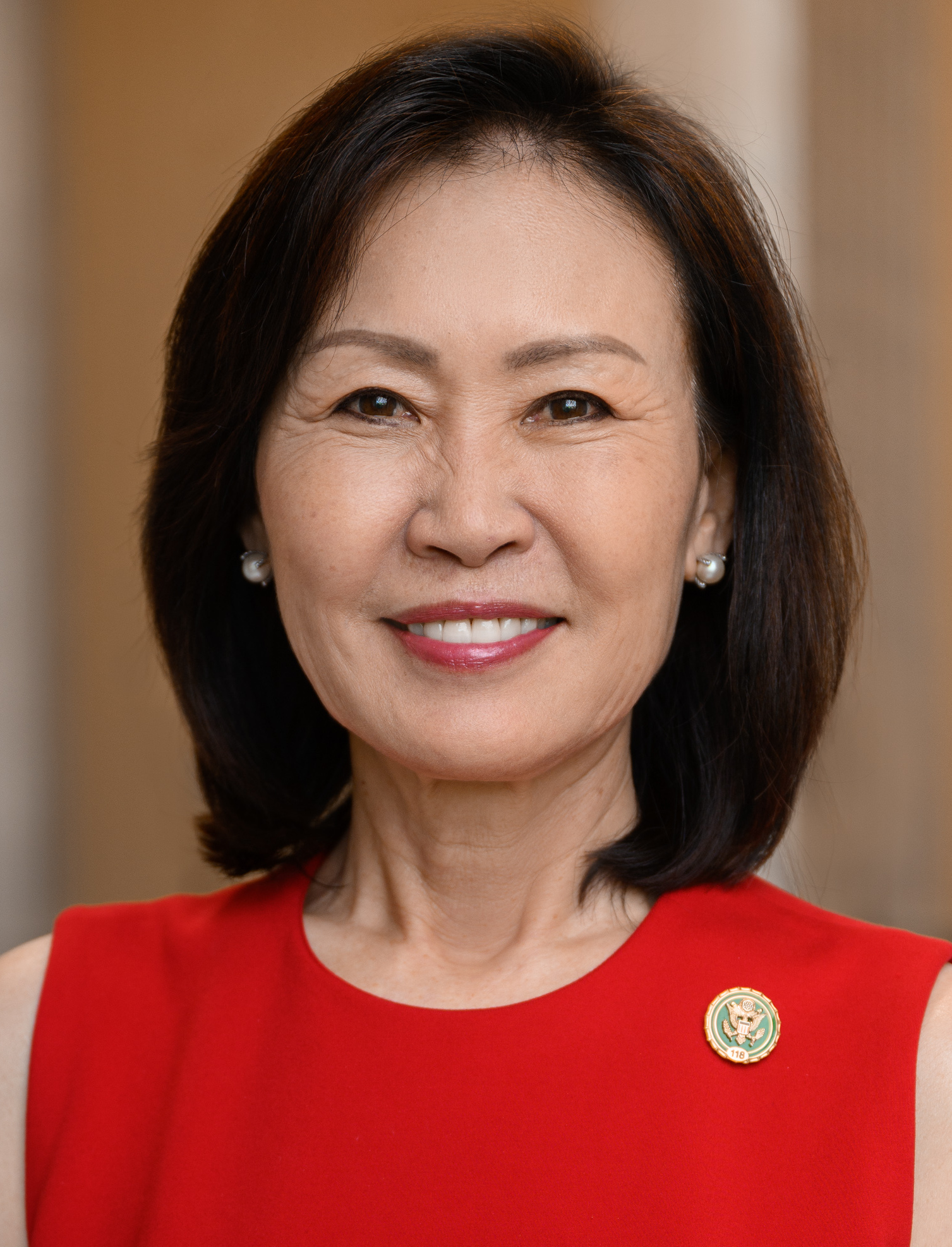
Steel in 2023.

Steel was a co-sponsor of the Life at Conception Act introduced in January 2023 during the 118th Congress. After a 2024 Alabama court ruling made clear that the bill's language could endanger the ability to administer in-vitro fertilization, Steel said "I do not support federal restrictions on IVF." She added further, "As someone who struggled to get pregnant, I believe all life is a gift. IVF allowed me, as it has so many others, to start my family. I believe there is nothing more pro-life than helping families have children." In March 2024, Steel rescinded her co-sponsorship of the bill due to her support for IVF.

=== Committee assignments ===
For the 118th Congress:

- Committee on Education and the Workforce
  - Subcommittee on Early Childhood, Elementary, and Secondary Education
  - Subcommittee on Health, Employment, Labor, and Pensions
- Committee on Ways and Means
  - Subcommittee on Health
  - Subcommittee on Work and Welfare
- Select Committee on Strategic Competition between the United States and the Chinese Communist Party

=== Caucus memberships ===
- Conservative Climate Caucus
- Republican Governance Group

== Post-congressional activities ==
In February 2025, Steel was appointed by Speaker of the House Mike Johnson to a bipartisan commission designed to study the feasibility of establishing a new national museum dedicated to the history and culture of Asian Americans and Pacific Islanders.

=== Ambassador to South Korea ===
On April 13, 2026, U.S. president Donald Trump nominated Steel to be the 25th U.S. Ambassador to South Korea. On June 17, 2026, U.S. Senate confirmed her appointment by a 55–39 vote. On July 30, 2026, she arrived in Seoul and presented her diplomatic credentials to President Lee Jae Myung on August 12, 2026.

== Personal life ==
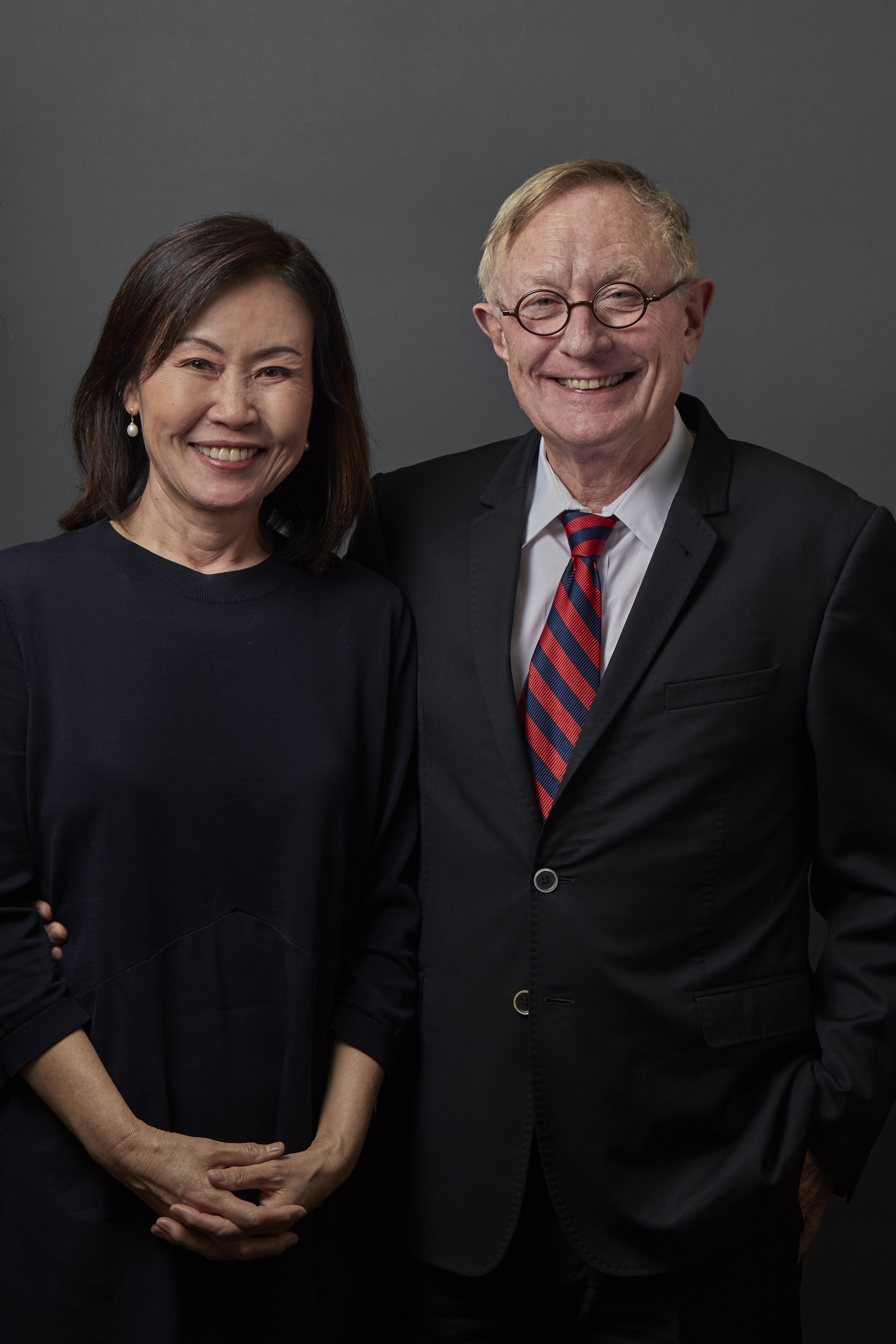
Steel with her husband, former California Republican Party chair Shawn Steel, in 2018.

In 1981, Steel married Shawn Steel, who was the California Republican Party chairman from 2001 to 2003 and has been the Republican National Committeeman from California since 2008. They have two daughters and live in Seal Beach, California. She is a Protestant Christian.

At a 2014 Tea Party event in Newport Beach, Steel said she had withdrawn her younger daughter from the University of California, Santa Cruz, and sent her to Loyola Marymount University for a one-year "brainwash" after her daughter voiced support for same-sex marriage and President Barack Obama.

== Electoral history ==
2024 United States House of Representatives elections in California
Primary election
Party	Candidate	Votes	%
Republican	Michelle Steel (incumbent)	78,022	54.9
Democratic	Derek Tran	22,546	15.9
Democratic	Kim Bernice Nguyen-Penaloza	22,179	15.6
Democratic	Cheyenne Hunt	11,973	8.4
Democratic	Aditya Pai	7,399	5.2
Total votes		142,119	100.0
General election
Democratic	Derek Tran	158,264	50.1
Republican	Michelle Steel (incumbent)	157,611	49.9
Total votes		315,875	100.0
Democratic gain from Republican			

2022 United States House of Representatives elections in California
Party	Candidate	Votes	%
Republican	Michelle Steel (incumbent)	113,163	52.4
Democratic	Jay Chen	102,802	47.6
Total votes		215,965	100
Republican hold			

2020 United States House of Representatives elections in California
Party	Candidate	Votes	%
Republican	Michelle Steel	201,738	51.1
Democratic	Harley Rouda (incumbent)	193,362	48.9
Total votes		395,100	100
Republican gain from Democratic			

Orange County Board of Supervisors 2nd district, 2018
Candidate	Votes	%
Michelle Steel (incumbent)	80,854	63.4
Brendon Perkins	31,387	24.6
Michael Mahony	15,281	12.0
Total votes	127,522	100.0

Orange County Board of Supervisors 2nd district, 2014
Candidate	Votes	%
Michelle Steel		62.5
Allan Mansoor (incumbent)		37.5
Total votes		100.0

2010 State Board of Equalization District 3 election
Party	Candidate	Votes	%
Republican	Michelle Steel (incumbent)	1,325,538	54.9
Democratic	Mary Christian Heising	836,057	34.6
Libertarian	Jerry L. Dixon	117,783	4.8
Peace and Freedom	Mary Lou Finley	79,870	3.3
American Independent	Terri Lussenheide	59,513	2.4
Total votes		2,418,761	100.0
Republican hold			

2006 State Board of Equalization District 3 election
Party	Candidate	Votes	%
Republican	Michelle Steel	1,147,514	56.99
Democratic	Mary Christian-Heising	774,499	38.47
Peace and Freedom	Mary Finley	91,467	4.54
Total votes		2,013,480	100.00
Republican hold			

== See also ==
- List of Asian Americans and Pacific Islands Americans in the United States Congress
- Asian American and Pacific Islands American conservatism in the United States
- Asian Americans in United States politics
- Women in the United States House of Representatives

U.S. House of Representatives
Preceded by Harley Rouda	Member of the U.S. House of Representatives from California's 48th congressional district 2021–2023	Succeeded by Darrell Issa
Preceded by Katie Porter	Member of the U.S. House of Representatives from California's 45th congressional district 2023–2025	Succeeded by Derek Tran
Diplomatic posts
Preceded by James Heller; Acting	United States Ambassador to South Korea; 2026–present	Incumbent
U.S. order of precedence (ceremonial)
Preceded by Mike Garcia as Former U.S. Representative	Order of precedence of the United States as Former U.S. Representative	Succeeded by Alec G. Olson as Former U.S. Representative
