= Alliance for the Separation of School and State =

- Formation: 1994
- Website: http://www.schoolandstate.org/

The Alliance for the Separation of School and State, previously called the "Separation of School and State Alliance" is an American organization that argues that parents are responsible for educating their children, and that education is not a legitimate function of government. One of its early supporters was John Taylor Gatto. It was founded by the late Marshall Fritz, who drew a distinction between "public" and "government-run, tax-funded" schools, giving the example that just as a restaurant is a public place, owned and operated by private individuals, so too could a school be operated by private individuals and available to the public. It has about 26,000 members. The group has a declaration stating "I proclaim publicly that I favor ending government involvement in education." intended for signature by private individuals and public figures. The organization has begun to make inroads into Ontario.

The Alliance for the Separation of School and State does not advocate the use of tax-funding for any educational enterprise. Its founder, Marshall Fritz believed that any school voucher or scholarship programs should be privately funded, and rejected the notion that it was acceptable for tax-payers to fund school vouchers. He frequently argued that allowing public money to go to private schools would invite government control and regulation of those schools, threatening their independence.

When Marshall Fritz was alive, among conservative groups and think tanks, there was a movement advocating tax-funded vouchers and charter schools. Many, such as Ron Trowbridge, argued that allowing government voucher programs would encroach on school and parental autonomy, and give government new powers to define and regulate education. Marshall Fritz said that focusing on this particular objection to tax funded vouchers made the debate about whether or not it was possible to craft a tyranny-proof voucher.

He stated that the primary reason tax funded vouchers are morally wrong, is that they violate the principle of subsidiarity. The family, not the state, has the responsibility and authority to educate children. In Marshall Fritz's view, parents must accept and perform their responsibility to decide their own worldview, and choose the best way to educate children, accordingly. Tax funded vouchers, in his view, provide an incentive for parents to believe their children's education is someone else's responsibility.
