= Alan Bock =

American writer (1943–2011)

Alan W. Bock (December 3, 1943 – May 18, 2011) was an American libertarian author. He was a senior editorial writer and former editorial page editor for the Orange County Register for over 25 years. He wrote regular columns for WorldNetDaily, LewRockwell.com, and Antiwar.com and was a contributing editor at Liberty magazine. He had also been published in The American Conservative.

== Career ==
Bock was also an active public speaker having experience in radio and television. He spoke at such forums as the Cato Institute, Reason Foundation, the Drug Policy Foundation, American Enterprise Institute, Freedom Summit, the Liberty Editors' Conference and the Festival of Freedom. In the 1970s, Bock spent eight years in Washington, D.C., where he worked for two different congressmen. He then formed a libertarian lobbying organization called Libertarian Advocate. He also spent some time working as a radio talk-show host where he appeared on CNN, Fox News, MSNBC, PBS, and countless others. He contributed to Reason, Freeman, National Review, and Harvard Business Review.

== Political views ==
Bock had been critical of both parties for their support of an aggressive foreign policy. He had also been critical of imperialism and nation-building, and believed that "the U.S. empire is in the process of winding down."

== Death ==
Bock died on May 18, 2011, after entering hospice due to cancer. He was 67 and was living in Lake Elsinore, California.

== Publications ==
He was the author of four books:

- The Ecology Action Guide (1971) ISBN 0-840211-86-4, OCLC 302290
- I Saw the Light: The Gospel Life of Hank Williams (1977) OCLC 50323514
- Ambush at Ruby Ridge: How Government Agents Set Randy Weaver Up and Took His Family Down (1995) ISBN 1-880741-48-2, OCLC 32779088
- Waiting to Inhale: the Politics of Medical Marijuana (2000) ISBN 0-929765-82-6, OCLC 45064514
