= Shawn Steel =

American political activist

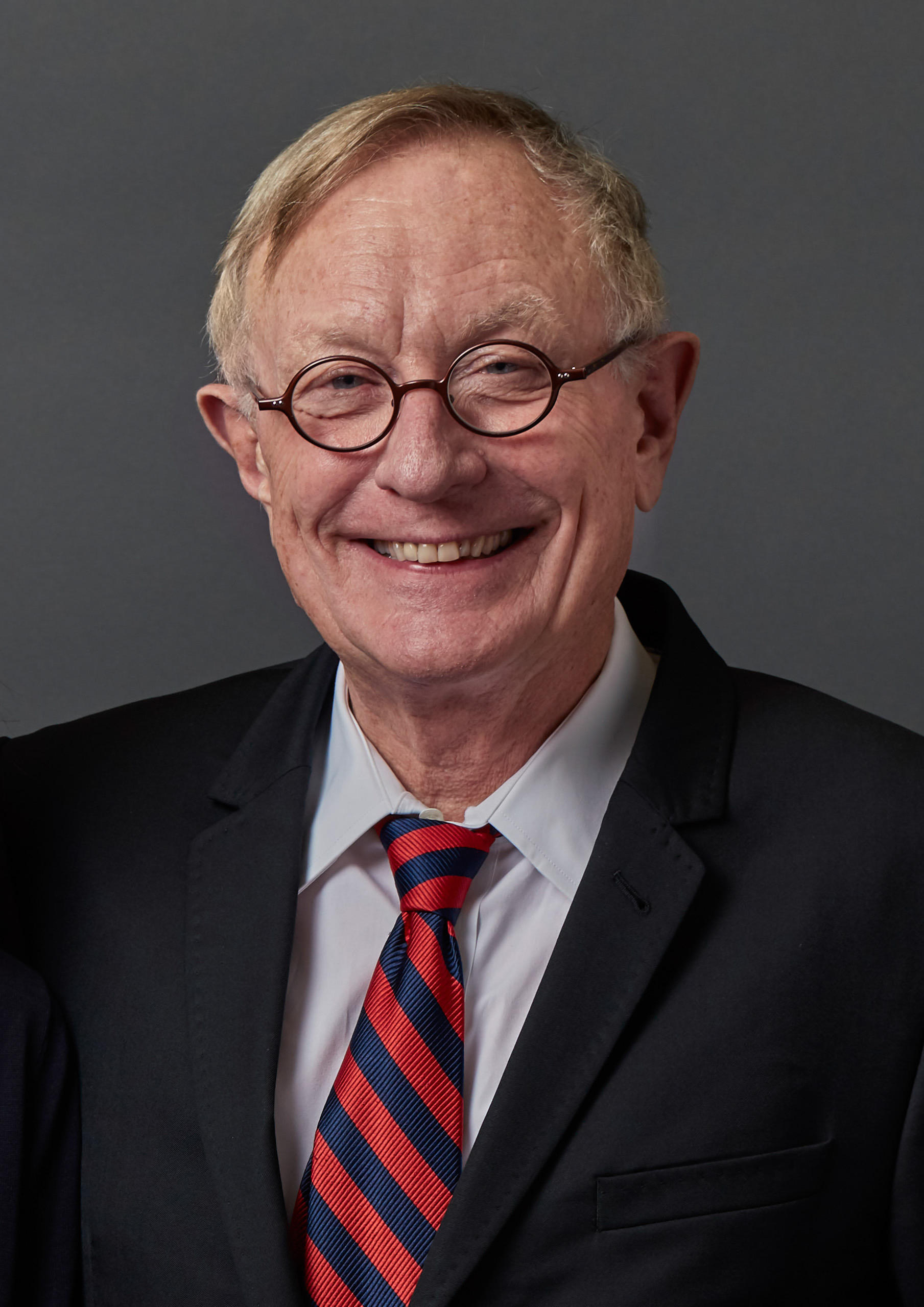

Republican National Committeeman from California
- Incumbent
- Assumed office 2008
- Preceded by: Tim Morgan

Chair of the California Republican Party
- In office February 25, 2001 – February 22, 2003
- Preceded by: John McGraw
- Succeeded by: Duf Sundheim

Personal details
- Born: 1946 (age 79–80) California, U.S.
- Spouse: Michelle Steel
- Children: 2
- Education: California State University, Northridge (BA); University of Southern California (MA); Northrop University (JD)

Shawn Steel (born c. 1946) is an American politician serving as the Republican National Committee Member from California since 2008. He was voted by his colleagues to the executive committee of the Republican National Committee in 2018. Steel served as Sergeant at Arms at both the Republican National Convention in Cleveland, Ohio, in 2016, as well as at the Republican National Convention in Milwaukee in 2024. In 2012, he served as deputy permanent co-chairman of the convention. He served as the elected chairman of the California Republican Party from 2001 to 2003. He is the husband of U.S. Ambassador to South Korea Michelle Steel.

As the California Republican Party Chairman, Steel was the co-founder of the successful recall of Governor Gray Davis in 2003, as well as the first signatory of the recall petition against Governor Davis.

Steel is a trial attorney specializing in personal injury law who specializes in representing alternative health care providers, particularly chiropractors and acupuncturists. He regularly teaches at Palmer West Chiropractic, Life Chiropractic College West and Southern California University of Health Sciences.

== Early life ==
As a teenager, Steel became interested in politics after hearing the speeches of Fred Schwarz, an Australian anti-communist lecturer. He was further influenced by Barry Goldwater's book Conscience of a Conservative. While an undergraduate student at California State University at Northridge Steel became involved in the group Young Americans for Freedom, though he was later removed from the group for his opposition to the draft and Vietnam War. He attended both the 1964 and 1968 Republican National Conventions.

== Education ==
Steel received his Bachelor of Arts degree from California State University. Northridge, his Master of Arts from the University of Southern California in Los Angeles, and his Juris Doctor from Northrop University in Inglewood, California.

== California Republican Party ==
While making his reputation suing insurance companies, Steel worked his way up the California Republican Party by fundraising and serving as a delegate to the 1996 state party convention. In 2001, he was elected as chair of the California Republican Party.

Steel was criticized by senior California Republican leaders as well as national leaders. Corporate raider Gerry Parsky, and President George W. Bush's unofficial representative in California questioned the strategy of recalling Gray Davis. Some party leaders objected to Steel's efforts to unseat Davis, fearing it was too risky. Steel at the CRP convention in February 2003 convinced an overwhelming majority to endorse the Recall, thus turning the tide for the recall campaign.

In 2024, Steel described the Donald Trump raised-fist photographs as "like too much perfection."

== Teaching ==
Steel teaches ethics and jurisprudence at Cleveland University-Kansas City in Los Angeles. He also is a regular lecturer at Palmer College of Chiropractic in San Jose and Southern California University of Health Services in Whittier.

== Public board service ==
He was appointed by Republican governor Pete Wilson to the California State Acupuncture Board. He was appointed in 1993 and served until 2000. Steel was elected by his peers as Chairman of the Acupuncture Board for two one-year terms.

== Private practice ==
Steel's personal injury practice, Steel & Eisner, LLP, is based in Seal Beach, California.

Steel is known for having represented family members of the notorious Jonestown massacre in Guyana in his early practice. In 2018, on behalf of three attendees injured at an event featuring far-right political commentator Milo Yiannopoulos, Steel sued the University of California at Berkeley, as well as the City of Berkeley.

== Chinese influence ==
In June 2020, Steel was linked by the Wall Street Journal to an effort by Chinese nationalists to influence the Trump administration. In May 2017, Steel held a gathering of GOP leaders to discuss campaign strategies and other issues. The meeting reportedly included Chinese nationals working closely with China's national-security apparatus, and Chinese military representatives. After the news was reported, the Republican National Committee said it had instructed Steel to break ties with the people identified in the reports, but did not return the donations because they did not believe them to be in violation of campaign-finance law. Steel responded to press by stating it would "false, defamatory, and offensive" to say he aided any Chinese efforts.

== Personal life ==
Steel married Michelle Park, who has been the U.S. Ambassador to South Korea since 2026. She was a U.S. Representative from 2021 until 2025.They have two daughters.
