= Butler D. Shaffer =

American author and law professor (1935–2019)

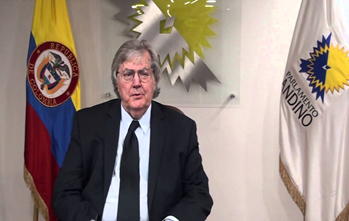
- Shaffer in the 1990s
- Born: January 12, 1935; Lincoln, Nebraska, U.S.
- Died: December 29, 2019 (aged 84); Burbank, CA, U.S.
- Resting place: Wyuka cemetery in Lincoln, Nebraska, Oakwood Cemetery, U.S.
- Spouse: Jane Conger Shaffer (m. 1957)

Academic background
- Education: University of Chicago
- Influences: Burt Blumert, Hayek, Mises, Nock, Ron Paul, Murray Rothbard, Aristotle, Aquinas, Barnes, Bastiat, Bawerk, Calhoun, Cantillon, Chodorov, Locke, Mencken, Menger, Oppenheimer, Plato, Rand, Say, Schumpeter, Socrates, Spencer, Spooner, Sumner

Academic work
- School or tradition: Austrian School
- Institutions: University of Nebraska College of Business Administration; Southwestern University School of Law
- Notable ideas: Anarcho-capitalism, libertarianism, title-transfer theory of contract

Butler D. Shaffer (January 12, 1935 – December 29, 2019) was an American author, law professor and speaker, known for his numerous libertarian books and blog articles for LewRockwell.com. He was a professor of Law Emeritus at the Los Angeles-based Southwestern University School of Law.

== Early years ==
Shaffer completed his B.S. (Law) in 1958 and B.A., Arts and Sciences in 1959 from the University of Nebraska, Lincoln, and received his J.D. in 1961 from University of Chicago. During this time, he became a member of the Colorado and Nebraska State Bars. Not long after graduating from law school, Shaffer took a position with the Midwest Employers Council in Lincoln, Nebraska as a labor relations consultant, and soon established a private law practice in Omaha.

Later, he joined the firm of Nelson, Harding, Marchetti, Leonard and Tate and started an academic career at the University of Nebraska College of Business Administration. Professor Shaffer began teaching at the Southwestern Law University in 1977, and continued as a faculty member until he retired in 2015. He taught courses such as administrative law, antitrust law, legal reasoning, possession and ownership, and property transactions.

In 2002, Shaffer was named the Irwin R. Buchalter Professor of Law in recognition of his outstanding contributions to legal education and scholarship. In 2011, he received the Excellence in Teaching Award, and in 2015, he took Emeritus status. In 2012, Shaffer was awarded the Gary G. Schlarbaum Prize for Lifetime Achievement in the Cause of Liberty, which was bestowed by the Mises Institute.

== Political Opinions ==
In his early years, Shaffer was attracted to conservative elements in the Republican Party. In 1961, he became the executive secretary of the Republican Party. By 1964 he had declared his support for the U.S. presidential candidacy of Sen. Barry Goldwater. After the defeat of Goldwater in 1964, Shaffer increasingly moved away from the world of politics, arguing in Calculated Chaos: Institutional Threats to Peace and Human Survival, that "institutions are the principle means by which conflict is produced and managed in society. Peace is incompatible with institutional activity."

During this period, Shaffer had come to the conclusion "that limited government was a chimera and that the state was by nature opposed to liberty." Eventually, he became more responsive to the anarcho-capitalist ideology of Murray Rothbard and Robert LeFevre. Taking a strong libertarian position, Shaffer wrote a weekly column for Freedom Communications Newspaper chain for many years.

Impressed with the classical liberal ideals of Robert LeFevre, who founded the Freedom School/Rampart College, Shaffer conducted a number of classes at the college from 1966 to 1968 in Colorado. He joined with Sy Leon in helping to operate Rampart College in Santa Ana, California, after LeFevre resigned his position in 1973.

== Publications ==
- The Politicization of Society, Kenneth S. Templeton Jr., edit., Essay 13, "Violence as a Product of Imposed Order," (Liberty Fund, 1979) ISBN 9780913966488
- Calculated Chaos: Institutional Threats to Peace and Human Survival, (originally published by Alchemy Books in 1985, Llumina Press, 2004) ISBN 978-1595263490
- In Restraint of Trade: The Business Campaign Against Competition, 1918-1938 (Bucknell University Press 1997, republished by the Ludwig von Mises Institute, 2008) ISBN 978-1611480849
- We Who Dare Say No to War: American Antiwar Writing from 1812 to Now, M. Polner and T. Woods, editors (Basic Books, 2008), chap. "Appendix: Great Antiwar Films," ISBN 978-1568583853
- Facets of Liberty: A Libertarian Primer, L.K. Samuels, edit., Freeland Press, 1985, revised edition, Rampart Institute, 2009), chap. 1, "Who Authorizes the Authorities?" ISBN 9780578003108
- Boundaries of Order: Private Property of a Social System, (Ludwig von Mises Institute, 2009) ISBN 978-1933550169
- Our Enemy The State, Albert Jay Nock; Introduction, (republished by the Ludwig von Mises Institute, 2009) ISBN 978-1610161732
- The Wizards of Ozymandias: Reflections on the Decline and Fall, (Ludwig von Mises Institute, 2012) ISBN 978-1479234578
- Why Peace, Marc Guttman, edit., chap. "War and Peace as States of Mind", (2012) ISBN 978-0984980208
- A Libertarian Critique of Intellectual Property, (Ludwig von Mises Institute, 2013) ISBN
