= Voluntary taxation =

Theory of taxation

Voluntary taxation is a theory that states that taxation should be a voluntary act. Under the theory, people should have the option to pay taxes instead of being forced to pay taxes by their government. Under this theory, the people would control how much they pay and where they spend it. The theory is a part of Objectivist politics and many libertarian ideologies. State lotteries are an example of a voluntary taxation system which incentivizes giving with the chance of individual rewards.

Proponents of some studies assert that individuals would voluntarily give to government to support specific functions. In one study, subjects were each given $20 to anonymously allocate between themselves and a designated charitable organization at their discretion (repeated for 12 different organizations, $240 total/subject). Voluntary donations averaged 22% for government organizations and 27% for private nonprofits, and were influenced by their cause, level, and perceptions of effectiveness and efficiency (on average, 76% of the endowment was kept by the subjects).

== History ==
The American federal income taxation system is sometimes called a "voluntary" taxation system. Marjorie E. Kornhauser writes, "Most people never pay their taxes voluntarily, in the ordinary sense of the word. Rather, they are generally anti-tax, in that they usually would prefer to keep any income they receive than pay it to the government in taxes. Voluntary, in the context of taxation, simply means that people do not have to be compelled to pay their taxes through actual enforcement actions by the state." The "income taxes are voluntary" argument has not prevented U.S. residents who did not file tax returns or pay taxes from being prosecuted and convicted for tax offenses.

Lysander Spooner stated, "It is true that the theory of our Constitution is, that all taxes are paid voluntarily; that our government is a mutual insurance company, voluntarily entered into by the people with each other; that each man makes a free and purely voluntary contract with all others who are parties to the Constitution, to pay so much money for so much protection, the same as he does with any other insurance company; and that he is just as free not to be protected, and not to pay tax, as he is to pay a tax, and be protected. But this theory of our government is wholly different from the practical fact. The fact is that the government, like a highwayman, says to a man: "Your money, or your life." And many, if not most, taxes are paid under the compulsion of that threat. The government does not, indeed, waylay a man in a lonely place, spring upon him from the roadside, and, holding a pistol to his head, proceed to rifle his pockets. But the robbery is none the less a robbery on that account; and it is far more dastardly and shameful."

In Second Treatise of Government (1690), John Locke took the position that all rights come from the people, and that the people must give their consent to be governed by elected representatives. L.K. Samuels extended John Locke's assertion under the "Rulers' Paradox" to illustrate why the collection of taxation could be seen as voluntary. Samuels contends that the Lockean "consent of the governed" only applies to rights that people possess, which are then loanable to a governing body, under the social contract. In cases of torture, kidnapping, wiretapping, theft, and assassination and other such transgressions, Samuels asks: "Where and how does a representative government acquire authority to perform such coercive acts, acts disallowed for individual citizens?" Under this interpretation of John Locke, Samuels maintains that taxation would have to be voluntary since people cannot loan rights to others that they themselves do not already have.

Locke argued in a quote attributed to him that "the people cannot delegate to government the power to do anything which would be unlawful for them to do themselves".

Thomas Jefferson lent weight to a voluntary society, writing that "No man has a natural right to commit aggression on the equal rights of another, and this is all from which the laws ought to restrain him." During his administration, President Jefferson abolished the whiskey excise and all other federal internal taxation on U.S. citizens, which was one of his campaign promises. The U.S. Federal government had no direct internal taxation for nearly 80 years.

Like many of the Founding Fathers, George Washington was an admirer of John Locke. He was vocal about the concept of consent of the governed, writing: "The Parliament of Great Britain hath no more Right to put their hands into my Pocket without my consent, than I have to put my hands into yours, for money."

== Example ==
Here is an example of how a voluntary taxation system could function.

A state would distribute tax forms that could be filled out by recipients. The forms would describe options which the recipients could designate preferences as to how the recipient would like his or her money spent. For example, there could be a section for military spending, or separate sections for defense in general and specific conflicts in particular. There would also be sections to be for elected officials (who would still be necessary to carry out the wishes of the people) and also sections for charities.

The form would be divided into more and more sections so that people could specify their decisions. The entire form would be under the category of general. Then there could be a section for education and then even further for elementary school education. People could choose which sections they wanted and contribute to those sections. For example, they could contribute different amounts to each section of education or to the section of education in general, allowing their elected officials to decide the best way to allocate the money.

== In popular culture ==
- When asked by Mario Lopez what her first executive order as president would be, Ellen DeGeneres advocated a mix of voluntary taxation and tax choice, stating "you should get to choose where your money goes instead of giving it and just letting them decide, I think you should decide."

== Support ==
The arguments for this theory are as follows:

- It allows greater freedom.
- It performs both the function of collecting money for the government and allowing the population to decide where money should be spent. It is similar to allowing everyone to vote on government spending except that it is in a different format.
- It allows government officials to easily keep track of the wants of their voters and the nation as a whole.
- It allows people to "vote" directly with their money. For example, they can decide if everyone should have health care by contributing to that section.
- It saves money that would otherwise be spent on tax collection by the government.

== Sources ==
- Payne, James L. "The end of taxation?", National Affairs
- Rothbard, Murray N. Man, Economy, and State (with "Power and Market"), Ludwig von Mises Institute, 2004. Textbook with a section that describes most of the theory of Voluntary Taxation

== See also ==
- Consent of the governed
- Crowdfunding
- Debates within libertarianism
- FairTax
- Free rider problem
- Land value tax
- Lottery
- Pigouvian tax
- Political ethics
- Social contract
- Taxation as slavery
- Taxation as theft
- Tax choice
- Voluntaryism
