= Society for Libertarian Life =

American libertarian student organization

Society for Libertarian Life (SLL) was one of the early libertarian student organizations that eventually charted chapters and had a nationwide presence in the United States. Founded in 1973 at California State University, Fullerton (CSUF), SLL was considered one of the largest and most active libertarian organizations along the West Coast. By 1980, it was reported to have 2,000 members.

== Early years ==
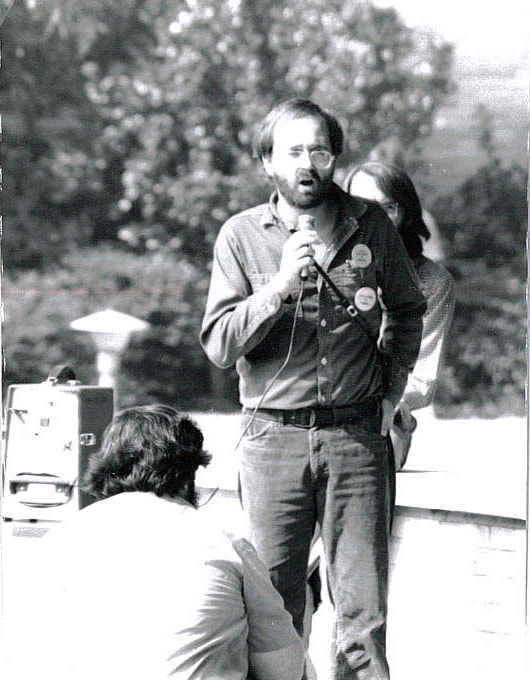
Lawrence Samuels, founder of SLL, speaking against state Senator Brigg's anti-gay measure (Prop. 6) before the evening debate between John Briggs and Eric Garris on October 26, 1978.

SLL rose out of a non-credited experimental college course at California State Fullerton (now California State University at Fullerton—CSUF) in 1973. Lawrence Samuels, a third-year commercial art and journalism student, taught the college course on the fundamentals of libertarianism. After the class concluded, the participants launched the Students for a Libertarian Society. Two years later the name was changed to include students and community members.

Samuels became SLL's first chairman and is considered its founder. In an interview, he claimed that SLL's primary goal as the elimination of victimless crime laws. In later years Samuels became the national chair and executive director until he moved to central California.

The organizations first publication was entitled The Libertarian New Horizon until it was changed later to Libertas Review: A Journal of Peace and Liberty. The organization also adopted a declaration of principles (May 5, 1973)—"The Libertas Statement", which was critiqued in Ayn Rand's book, The Voice of Reason: Essay in Objective Thought.

SLL produced a prolific amount of educational material. In a newspaper interview of SLL leaders in 1974, the Fullerton News Tribune reported that the organization had "an entire propaganda machine of books, newspapers and magazines" touting the libertarian cause.

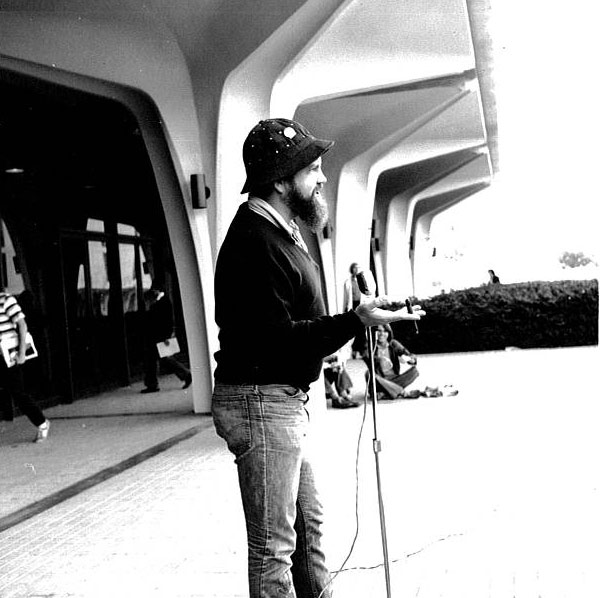
Phillip Abbott Luce speaks in front of the California State University, Fullerton (CSUF) library on March 22, 1974.

The organization arranged a number of notable speeches by academicians and authors from across the nation. The first public activity was a lecture by author Phillip Abbott Luce on in March 1974. Luce had defected from the pro-Red Chinese Progressive Labor Party in 1965. Before his break with the PLP, Luce had organized trips with Jerry Rubin to meet with Fidel Castro in Cuba.

Luce's speech was controversial. During his speech, he advocated the "demise of tax-supported education," and that taxation could be considered legal theft. The "uproar in facility circles was extensive," since the speech was funded by the university. Two other organizations co-sponsored the event, CSUF Economic Association, which provided the funding, and the California Young Americans for Freedom (YAF).

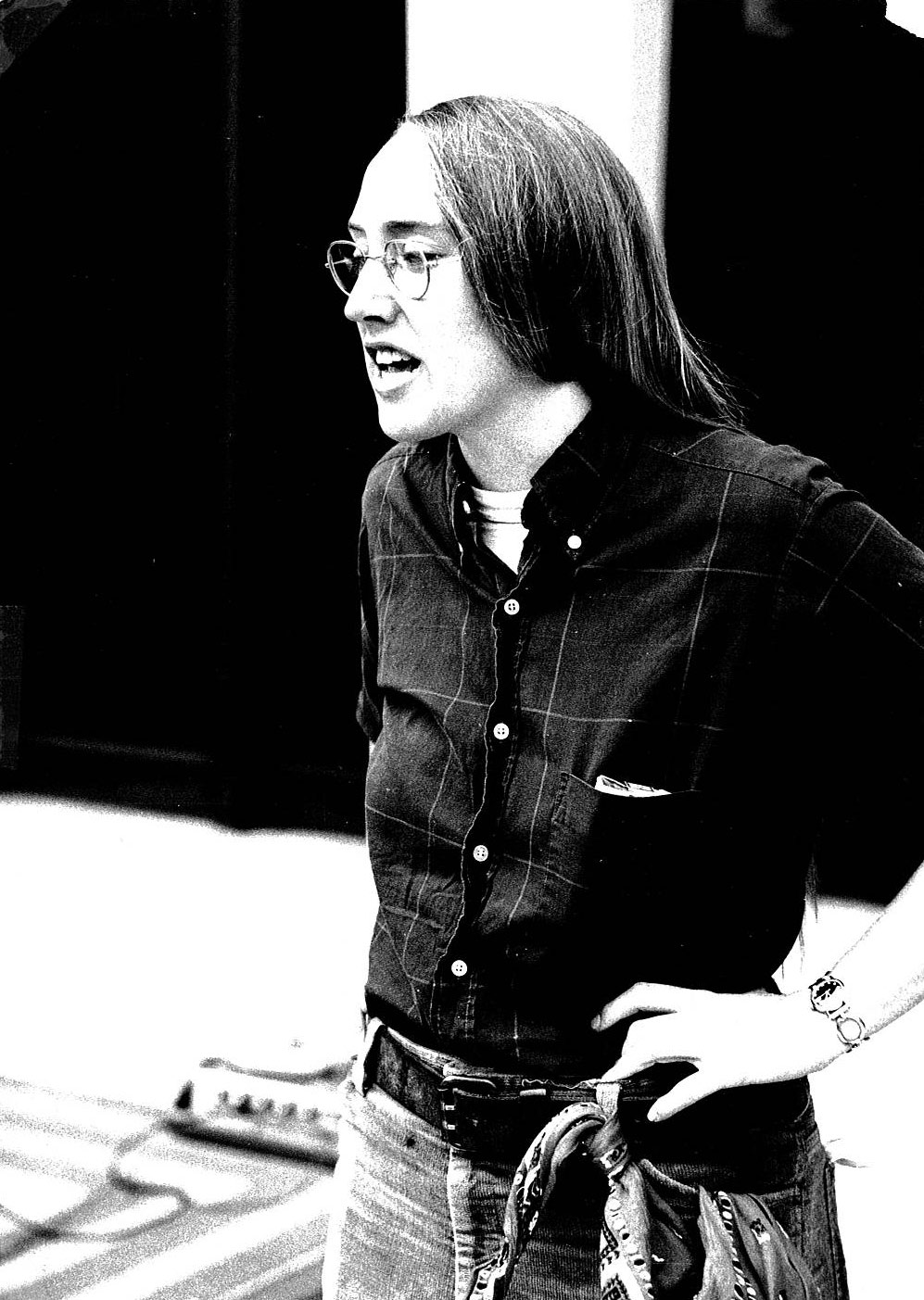
Elizabeth Keathley speaks at CSUF in October of 1974. She was the 1974 gubernatorial candidate for governor of California under the Peace and Freedom Party banner.

Another controversial speech sponsored by SLL was the appearance of Elizabeth Keathley, a 21-year-old UCLA student who referred to herself as a leader in the feminist and libertarian movement. She spoke at CSUF as the Peace and Freedom Party's candidate for California governor. A former Maoist, she touted the virtues of capitalism, libertarianism and anarchism, telling the audience that "Government keeps the people poor and limits business growth." Earlier, she had campaigned in the nude at Venice beach, proclaiming that she had nothing to hide.

The largest paper in Orange County, California, The Register, described SLL as "not a band of political activists, but rather an educational group dedicated to infecting the campus air with pro-freedom ideas—a bias of which they are uncompromising." Also in 1975, an editorial writer for The Register in Orange County, Ken Grubbs Jr., spoke to SLL in Anaheim on "The State of Libertarianism Today."

In 1976 other speakers included Prof. Tibor Machan, author of The Libertarian Alternative. A professor of philosophy at State University of New York at Fredonia, New York, he spoke about the "Assault on Human Rights." It was cosponsored by the CSUF Philosophy Club.

In the same year, Dr. Nathaniel Branden, a former associate of novelist Ayn Rand, spoke at an SLL-sponsored speech at Fullerton College on economic and civil liberties. Devon Showley, a physicist at Cypress College, emceed the event.

Other notable speakers included attorney and Libertarian Party candidate for U.S. Vice President David Bergland at Chapman College in the city of Orange, on 1976 presidential election and the nature of law, USC professor of philosophy John Hospers, and professor of educational policy studies, Joel Spring.

In 1977 SLL co-sponsored with the Cato Institute and the William Koch Foundation two lectures by Austrian economist Prof. Murray Rothbard at the University of California, Irvine. Some 200 students attended the evening lecture on "The Economic Future."

From its early days, SLL had affiliated with the nationwide libertarian organization known as Society for Individual Liberty (SIL), which was founded after the infamous split between traditionalists and libertarians at the YAF 1969 national convention. In 1976 SLL won SIL's 1975-1976 "outstanding local libertarian organization" award.

== Anti-Tax Protests ==
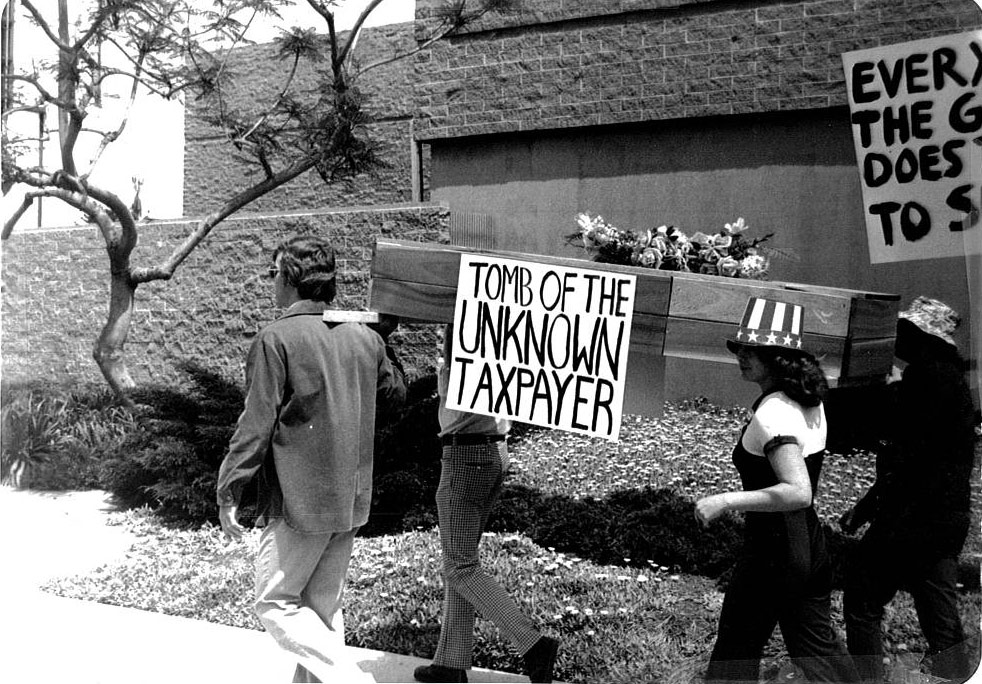
Anti-tax demonstrators carrying "Tomb of the Unknown Taxpayer" near Orange County, California IRS office on May 1, 1976.

For over a decade, SLL organized annual anti-tax demonstrations in Southern California. One of the largest occurred in 1976 in downtown Santa Ana, California, along with the Libertarian Party. Protesters staged a "mock funeral, complete with coffin and flowers" which represented the "Tomb of the Unknown Taxpayer." According to news reports, Karl Bray, a famous tax resister who had been imprisoned at Terminal Island was denied bail "to prevent him from attending" or speaking at the anti-tax rally. Karl Bray's wife spoke in behalf of her husband. The rally coincided with National Tax Protest Day.

== Senator Briggs' Prop. 6 anti-gay initiative ==
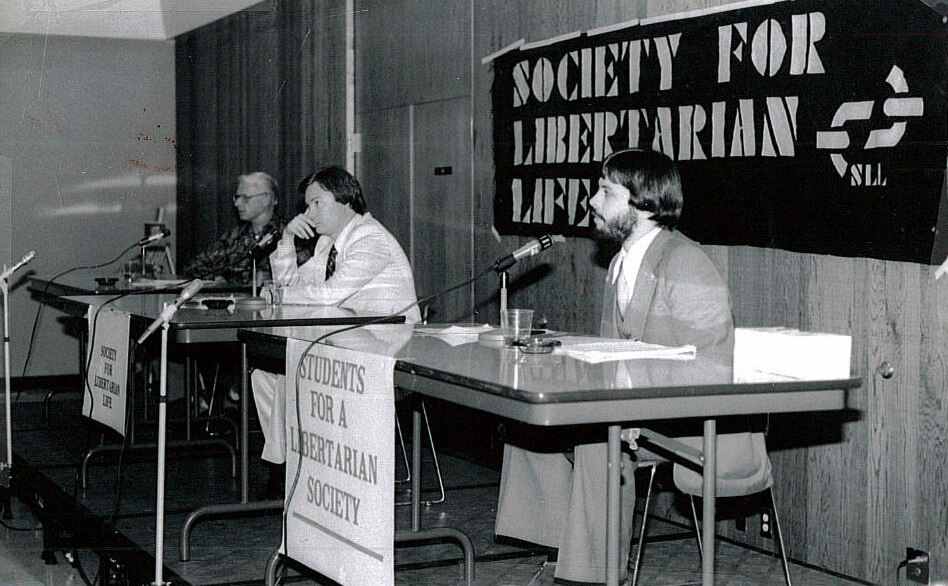
Senator John Briggs and Eric Garris debate on October 26, 1978 at CSUF. Briggs failed to show. From right to left: anti-prop. 6 debater Eric Garris, moderator Ken Grubbs, Jr. and replacement UCI Prof. George Kent.

In late October 1978, SLL sponsored a debate between state Senator John V. Briggs, R-Fullerton, and libertarian pro-gay rights activist Rev. Eric Garris at CSUF. Hours before the debate, SLL co-sponsored an anti-Prop. 6 rally, headlined by Ed Clark, the Libertarian Party candidate for Governor, and later a candidate for U.S. president.

Moderated by The Register editor of the editorial page, Ken Grubbs Jr., the debate centered on Sen. Briggs' Proportion 6 (Briggs Initiative) that would ban gay teachers and administrators from working in public education. The proposition would have made it illegal for gays and lesbians, and potentially anyone else who upheld gay rights, from working in California's public school system.

Over 300 students attended, but Senator Briggs failed to appear at the debate, substituting at the last moment UCI professor George Kent. SLL and three other plaintiffs filed a $3,500 breach of contract suit against Sen. Briggs and California Defend Our Children. Newport Beach attorney David Bergland volunteered to take the case pro-bono. When the suit was filed, Briggs was quoted as saying that the lawsuit was ridiculous, similar to "suing someone for breaking a date." Don Sizemore, an aide for Briggs, remarked that the senator decision not to debate was due to receiving "several threats on his life" and that the debate site offered poor security. The lawsuit failed two years later, but so did the Briggs Initiative, by a wide margin.

== 1979 draft card-burning demonstrations ==
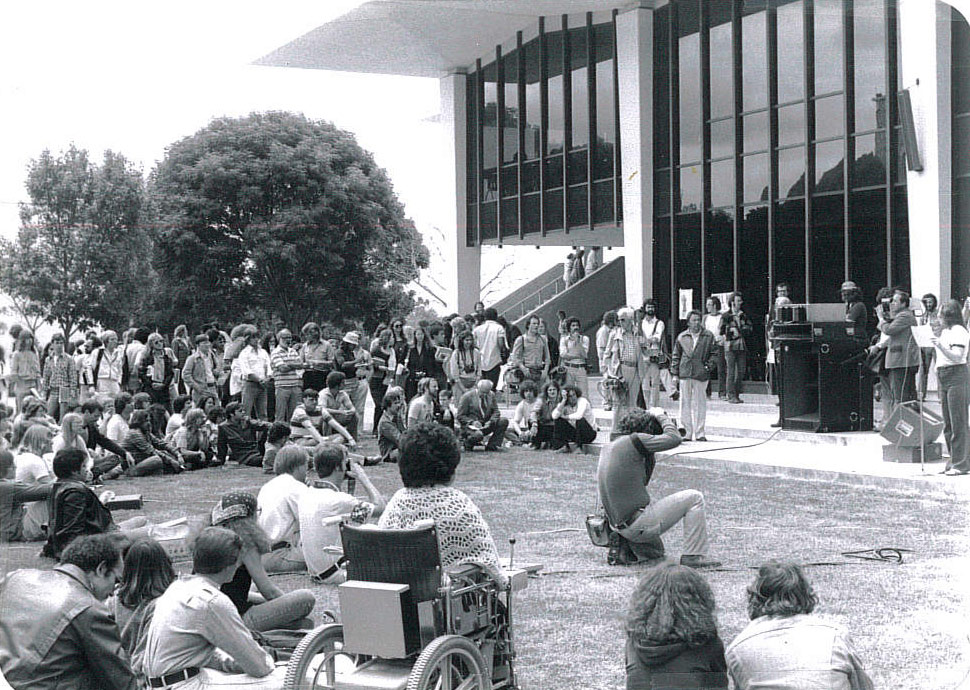
Draft-card-burning rally at CSUF in May of 1979 to protest U.S. Congress's attempt to reinstate conscription.

One of SLL's largest demonstration and media event occurred on May 1, 1979, at CSUF with two hours of rock music, anti-war songs and anti-draft speeches. The demonstration garnished nationwide media attention with front-page newspaper coverage along with representatives from all three LA area TV network stations.

With over 100 student onlookers, national SLL chair Lawrence Samuels took a match and burned his draft card to protest Carter administration and U.S. Congress attempts to reinstate the draft and compulsory draft registration. Other anti-draft speakers included libertarian historian Kenneth Gregg Jr.; SLL chair at CSUF, Howard Hinman; Association of Libertarian Feminists, Janice Allen; economics CSUF instructor, Prof. Jack High; and, California Libertarian Party leader, Dan Mahaffey.

Three other SLL chapters in Orange County arranged anti-draft protests at local college campuses, which were also co-sponsored by the San Francisco-based Students for a Libertarian Society (SLS).

== 1980 Voluntary Census Committee ==
An offshoot of SLL, the Voluntary Census Committee (VCC) gathered census forms from protesters across the nation in 1980. During a protest, the census questionnaires were torn and burned in public view.

In a New York Times article, Samuels "cited the use of census data during World War II to round up Americans of Japanese ancestry." In another newspaper story, Danny Twedt from "the 2,000-member Society for Libertarian Life in California," worried about the loss of privacy due to the U.S. census.

One protest letter distributed to reporters read: "Here is my census form. Do with it as you wish. I want no part of it…for you to fold, spindle, mutilate and burn." SLL and VCC handed out buttons in opposition to the 1980 census that read "Count Me Out."

== Robert LeFevre's two lecture series and booklets ==
Robert LeFevre, author, TV broadcaster and founder of Rampart College in Colorado (1911–1986) presented two SLL-sponsored lectures at Santa Ana College that were published as two separate booklets by SLL and Rampart Institute Press.

LeFevre's "Good Government: Hope or Illusion?" speech in May 1977 was turned into a 32-page booklet.

LeFevre's "Does Government Protection Protect?" speech on in May 1978 was turned into a 42-page booklet. Asserting that "Governments have provided us with laws of retaliation, not laws of protection," LeFevre spoke to a large college crowd.

== SLL off-shoots and ad hoc committees ==
Over 45 issue papers and posters were produced from the early 1970s to the mid-1980s. There were a number of SLL ad hoc committees or offshoots including Voluntary Census Committee (VCC), Libertarian Anarchist Alliance. Freedom of Speech Coalition, libertarian faction within the California Peace Freedom Party in California, Freeland I, II and III New/Free Country Conference of 1983 to 1985, Libertarians for Educational Choice (LEC), Rampart Institute, six The Future of Freedom Conference and the Libertarian Supper Club of Orange County operated by the main co-founders Jack Dean and Dyanne Peterson.

Under the direction of Bradford J. Rodriguez, SLL was one of the first libertarian organizations to set up its own computerized bulletin board and electronic mailbox by 1983.

SLL's advisory board included many prominent libertarians: Prof. Murray Rothbard, Robert LeFevre, Prof. John Hospers, Robert Anton Wilson, Prof. Thomas Hazlett, Prof. Leonard Liggio, Karl Hess, Harry Hoiles, Prof. David Bergland, Prof. Tibor Machan, Dana Rohrabacher, Prof. Charles W. Baird, Eric Garris, George H. Smith, Tonie Nathan, Shawn Steel, Ed Clark, Prof. Jack High, John Pugsley, etc.

Major SLL leaders included: Howard Hinman, Rod Boyer, Bradford J. Rodriguez, Kevin Kordes, Daniel d'Avignon, Kenneth R. Gregg. Jr., Jim Gallagher, Barry Turnbull, Paul O'Neil, David Moore, Pat Walsh, Danny Twedt, Pam Maltzman, Neal Glass, Alan Heath, Ted Barnes, Judi Barnes, Karen Poe, Ted Rogers, Bob Blair, Ray Irvine and Jeff Smith.

By the late 1980s, SLL began to fade away as many of their long-time leaders moved to other areas.
