= Central Corporative Committee =

The Central Corporative Committee (Italian: Comitato Corporativo Centrale) was an Italian government agency founded in 1934 by the Fascist Regime.

The CCC was tasked with promoting debate and mediation between employers and employees, as well as with ensuring regular management. The organ was also entrusted with price fixing at a nationwide level.

Following the implementation of autarchist policies, the Committee took the name of Supreme Commission for Autarchy and worked in coordinating the economic plans each corporation had drafted between 1935 and 1937 in order to make the Italian economy self-sufficient.

== See also ==
- Chamber of Fasces and Corporations
- Institute for Industrial Reconstruction
