= Rampart Institute =

Non-profit political education foundation

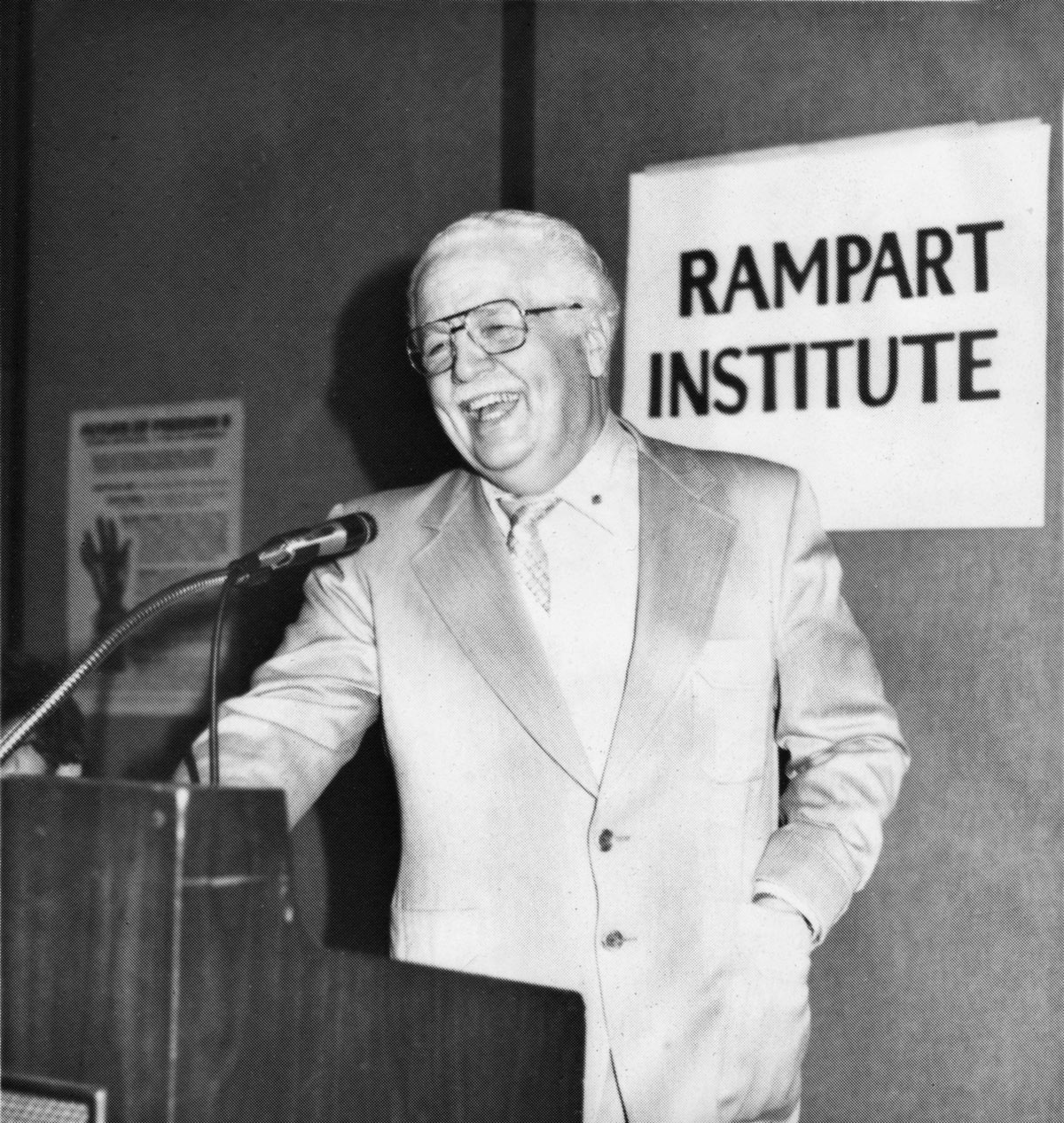
Robert LeFevre speech at the April 19, 1980 banquet to officially launch Rampart Institute.

Rampart Institute is an incorporated non-profit educational foundation officially launched in 1980 to “bring public awareness to libertarian/individualist ideals through a unique education program,” and to revive some of the activities associated with the defunct Colorado Springs-based Rampart College (1963–1975) and Freedom School (1956–1973).

== Early years ==
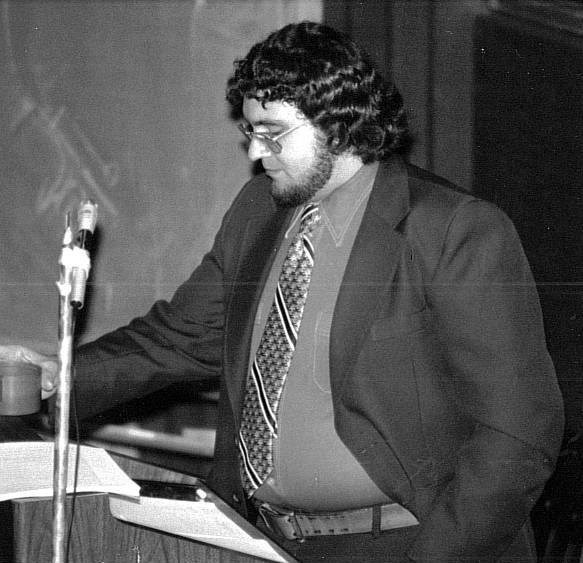
Libertarian historian Kenneth Gregg Jr. was the first president of Rampart Institute.

During the late 1970s, the driving personalities behind the establishment of Rampart Institute were Robert LeFevre, Kenneth Gregg, Jr., Lawrence Samuels, and Richard Deyo. This push to create an educational think tank first came to fruition with the publication of two Santa Ana College speeches by Robert LeFevre in 1978 and 1979, and two booklets, Good Government: Hope or Illusion? and Does Government Protection Protect?

The inauguration of Rampart Institute was held on April 19, 1980 with a “Tribute to Robert LeFevre” banquet at The Future of Freedom Conference at Cypress College. Speakers were: Harry Hoiles of the Freedom Newspapers chain; Richard Deyo; businessman John Roscoe; attorney Linda Abrams; businessman Chuck Estes; attorney and one of the founders of the Future of Freedom Conference series, Shawn Steel; businessman Walt Ryan; Caroline Roper-Deyo; and Richard Radford.

After obtaining 501(c) 3 non-profit status in 1981, Rampart Institute’s first elected president was libertarian historian Kenneth Gregg Jr. Its first executive director was writer Lawrence Samuels. Rampart Institute published two journals, the bi-monthly New Rampart and the quarterly Rampart Individualist.

== Middle years ==
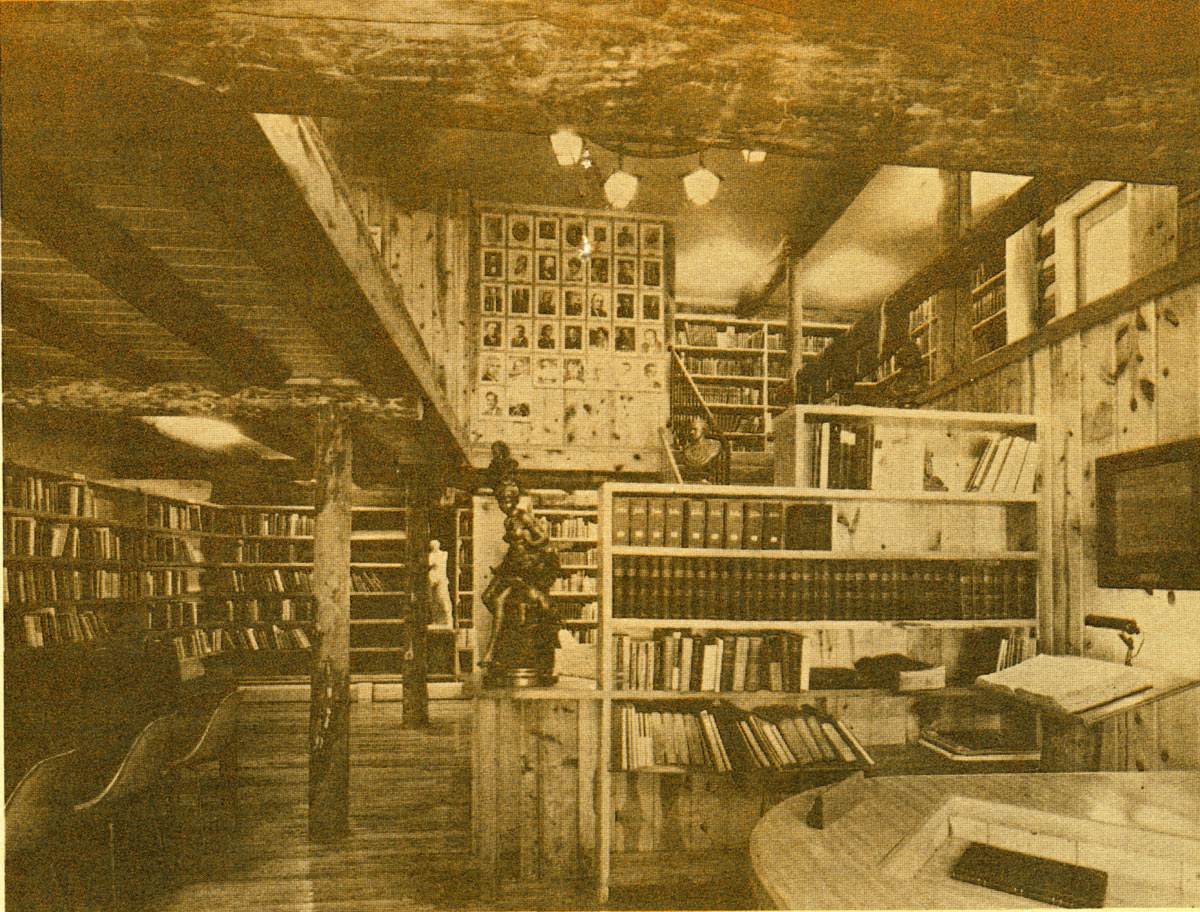
LeFevre’s library, dubbed the “Wilder Lane Library” while at Rampart College in Colorado Springs, was sold in the late 1977s to a university in Texas.

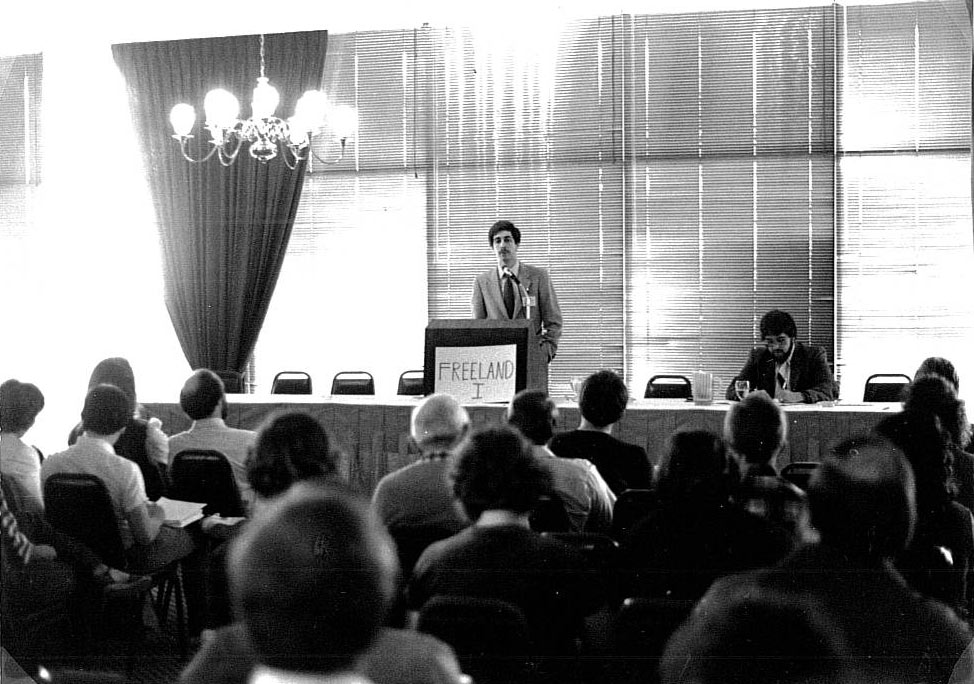
Aerospace engineer Gary Hudson speaking at the first Freeland Conference (1983) sponsored mainly by Rampart Institute.

One of the stated goals published in their 1980 prospectus was to acquire an office building to house LeFevre’s 7,000 “Freedom Library”, which had been in storage at the Northwood Institute in Dallas, Texas for years.“ Other objectives included a publishing house, speaker’s bureau, research library, periodicals, films, seminars and conferences, and the promotion of Robert LeFevre’s autarchist-based philosophy.

Rampart Institute was one of the main co-sponsors of The Future of Freedom Conference series from 1980 to 1985. The institute sponsored the three Freeland Conferences in 1983, 1984, 1985 and the 1981 and 1982 Keys to Learning Expos held in Southern California.

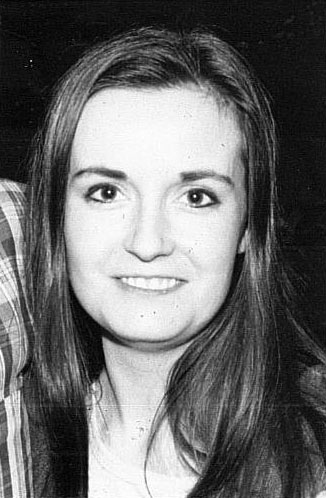
Libertarian feminist and author Wendy McElroy was an early board member of Rampart Institute.

Some of the more noteworthy Executive Board members of Rampart Institute included author and objectivist George H. Smith; an owner of the Love Box Company, Robert D. Love; vice chairman of the board of Freedom Newspaper, Harry Hoiles; systems analyst Jane Heider; Los Angeles attorney Linda Abrams; writer and publisher Richard Radford; author and founder of Rampart College, Robert LeFevre; businessmen Dennison and Randall Smith; League of Women Non-Voters leader Caroline Roper-Deyo; bestselling author John Pugsley; and individual feminist Wendy McElroy.

== Liberty Book Project ==
One of the major projects that Rampart Institute undertook was the editing and publication of LeFevre’s 52-week audio home study-course called “The Fundamentals of Liberty”. The 487-page hardback book was published posthumous in 1988.

== Later years ==
In later years, Rampart Institute sponsored a number of “Freeland Forum” events in Monterey, California. One was a debate between Prof. David R. Henderson and Prof. Erika Weis McGrath in May 1993 at Monterey Peninsula College, entitled: “The 1980s: The Best of Times or the Worst of Times?” A series of co-sponsored speeches focused on opposing the drug war, with speeches by former San Jose police chief Joseph McNamara, and Jack Herer, author of the underground bestseller The Emperor Wears No Clothes.
