= L. K. Samuels =

American writer

- Born: December 7, 1951 (age 74)
- Occupations: Author, activist
- Website: lksamuels.com

L. K. Samuels (born December 7, 1951), also known as Lawrence Samuels, is an American author and libertarian activist associated with classical liberal political movements in California. He is known as the editor and contributing author of Facets of Liberty: A Libertarian Primer and the author of In Defense of Chaos: The Chaology of Politics, Economics and Human Action.

== Early life and education ==
Samuels was born in Huntington Park, California, and moved to the city of Fullerton in Orange County, California, at approximately two years of age. He attended Sunny Hills High School in Fullerton, where he became politically active after attending a speech by Dana Rohrabacher, who was later elected to the United States Congress.

Samuels attended Fullerton College, where he served as editor-in-chief of the campus newspaper, and in 1976 earned a Bachelor of Arts degree in commercial art with a minor in journalism from California State University, Fullerton.

== Political and activist activities ==
=== Student organizing and Young Americans for Freedom ===
In 1973 following an interview with Robert LeFevre, president of Rampart College in Santa Ana, Samuels organized the Jefferson-Libertarian Caucus within YAF. That same year he became editor and publisher of The New Horizon, an underground newspaper at Fullerton College, while also contributing columns to the official campus newspaper The Hornet.

=== Society for Libertarian Life ===
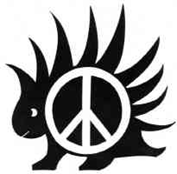
Designed by L.K. Samuels, the PorcuPeace symbol combines the twin principles of self-defense and non-aggression.

In 1973 at California State University, Fullerton, Samuels founded and chaired the Society for Libertarian Life (SLL), which grew into one of the largest libertarian student organizations on the West Coast, reporting approximately 2,000 members by 1980. The organization sponsored lectures by figures including Tibor Machan, Nathaniel Branden, John Hospers, George H. Smith, David Bergland, and Robert LeFevre, among others. SLL published the journals The New Libertarian Horizon and later Libertas Review.

The Society for Individual Liberty, described at the time as the largest libertarian organization in the country, recognized SLL and Samuels as the outstanding local libertarian organization for 1975–76. In 1978, SLL sponsored a debate on California Proposition 6, a ballot initiative that would have barred homosexuals from teaching in public schools. The opposing candidate, State Senator John Briggs, did not appear at the debate, and SLL subsequently filed suit against him through attorney David Bergland.

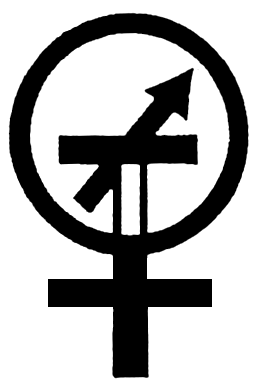
Libertarian Feminism symbol designed by L.K. Samuels in the mid-1970s

In 1979, Samuels led a draft-card burning demonstration that received national attention. He also organized the Voluntary Census Committee to oppose what he characterized as privacy encroachments by the 1980 U.S. Census, under the slogan Count Me Out.

=== Peace and Freedom Party ===
In 1974, Samuels joined the Peace and Freedom Party (PFP) and was elected to its Orange County Central Committee, representing the 39th Congressional district as a delegate to the 1974 PFP convention in Sacramento. The convention resulted in a split between libertarian and socialist factions; the libertarian faction was recognized as the legal PFP organization for approximately two years. Samuels assisted in the PFP gubernatorial campaign of Elizabeth Keathley in 1974. He was expelled by the socialist faction in 1976, following the resignation of the PFP State Central Committee, whose members subsequently joined the Libertarian Party.

=== Rampart Institute and Future of Freedom Conference ===
In the late 1970s, Samuels supported the founding of Rampart Institute. When it became a 501(c)(3) non-profit educational foundation in 1980, he served as its president. Robert LeFevre and Harry Hoiles, owner of the Santa Ana Register, served on its board of directors. Samuels edited its quarterly journal Rampart Individualist and served as managing editor of the bi-monthly New Rampart.

From 1980 to 1985, Samuels co-managed and later managed The Future of Freedom Conference series in Southern California. Participants included Murray Rothbard, Karl Hess, Thomas Szasz, Timothy Leary, Ray Bradbury, Arthur Laffer, Robert Anton Wilson, and David D. Friedman, among others.

=== Monterey County and later activism ===
In 1992, Samuels sold his typesetting and graphics business and relocated to Monterey County, California, where he became involved in real estate. He served as Northern Vice Chair of the Libertarian Party of California from 2003 to 2007.

In 2003, he managed the campaign opposing Measure Q in Monterey County, a proposed half-cent sales tax increase intended to fund Natividad Medical Center. Although proponents of the measure reportedly outspent opponents by a ratio of approximately 100 to 1, the measure was defeated. The medical center subsequently remained open and recorded profits of nearly $13 million in the 2009–2010 fiscal year, contrary to predictions made during the campaign that it would close.

In 2008, Samuels was elected chairman of the Project Area Committee (PAC), a citizens' advisory body to the Seaside Redevelopment Agency concerning eminent domain matters in Seaside, California. He is also listed as a founder and vice chair of the Seaside Taxpayers Association.

Samuels participated in opposition to the Iraq War, organizing peace rallies and speeches through the non-interventionist organization Libertarians for Peace and the Peace Coalition of Monterey County. He co-founded the Foundation to End Drug Unfairness Policies (FED-UP), an organization opposed to drug prohibition policies. He received the 2007 Karl Bray Memorial Award, presented by the Samuel Adams Society.

In 2009, Samuels ran for city council in the proposed incorporation of Carmel Valley, California, as one of the leaders opposed to the incorporation effort. He publicly encouraged voters not to support either him or the incorporation measure. The vote for incorporation failed.

== Bibliography ==
Samuel's published works include:

- Facets of Liberty: A Libertarian Primer, Freedom Press and Rampart Institute, 2nd edition, 2009, first published 1985. ISBN 978-0-578-00310-8
- Dreams Gone to Seed, play written in 2009.
- In Defense of Chaos: The Chaology of Politics, Economics and Human Action, first published in 2013. ISBN 978-1-935942-05-4
- Hitler and Mussolini: History’s Dirty Little Secret, written as content for a script to be used in the production of a documentary film.
- Killing History: The False Left-Right Political Spectrum and the Battle between the 'Free Left' and the 'Statist Left' (2019) ISBN 978-0-9615893-1-8
- Ferret: The Reluctant King (2020) ISBN 978-0-9615893-2-5
- We Are Them: The Apocalypse Syndrome (2021) ISBN 978-0-9615893-3-2
- FACETAS DE LA LIBERTAD: Un manual libertariano (Spanish Edition of Facets of Liberty) (2021) ISBN 978-0961589349
- We Are Them: The War Years (2022) ISBN 978-0-9615893-5-6
- Entering the Fascist-Marxist Twilight Zone: The Collected Works of L.K. Samuels and the Freedom Riders Groupe (2025) ISBN 978-09615893-8-7
