= Rampart College =

Defunct American libertarian educational institution

Rampart College, also referred to as the Freedom College, was an unaccredited American libertarian educational institution established in 1956 by Robert LeFevre in Colorado. The college was a four-year school for followers of LeFevre's autarchism and classical liberals. It was originally founded as the Freedom School.

== Early years ==
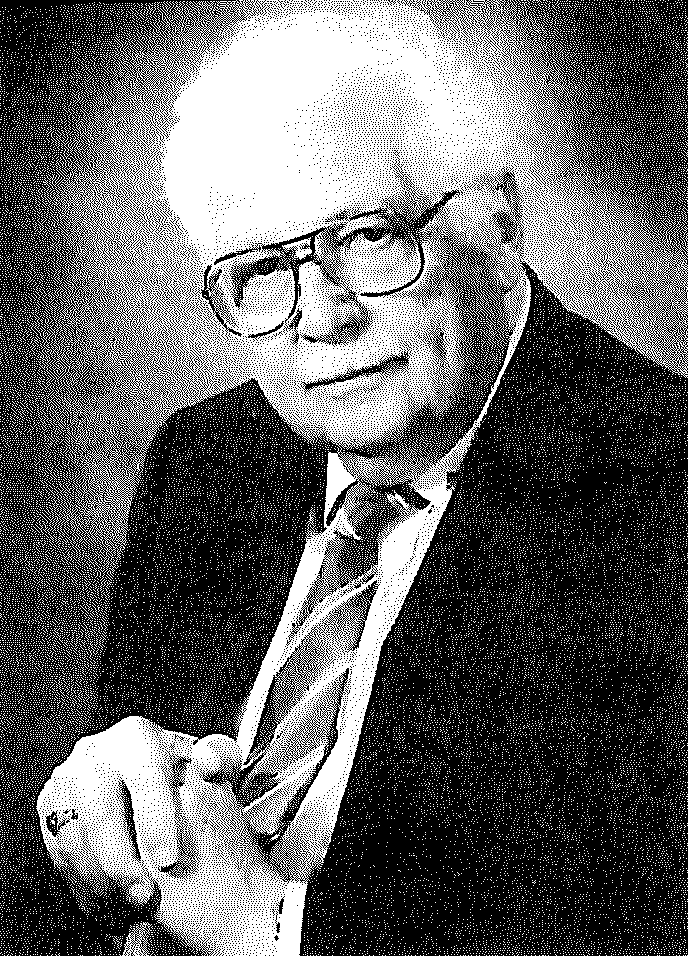
Robert LeFevre in 1986

LeFevre bought Glenrose Park, a 320-acre ranch south of Larkspur in Douglas County, Colorado, in September 1955, using an inheritance from his mother, and started enrolling students in 1956. He purchased the property explicitly in order to establish a school to teach free-enterprise principles. Rising to over 7,000 feet above sea level, the forested land contained several cabins of questionable condition. In addition to LeFevre, the first board of directors included Ruth Dazey, William J. Froh, Lois LeFevre, Majorie Llewellin, Robert B. Rapp, and Edith Shank.

== Freedom School renamed Rampart College ==
During the winter of 1964, the trustees of the Freedom School decided to officially rename the educational institution Rampart College after the nearby Rampart Range mountains. Froh assumed the position of president, while LeFevre was named dean and put in charge of instruction. By October 1964, the institution stated that over 730 students had completed courses at Freedom School since 1956. From 1965 to 1968, Rampart College published its primary publication—Rampart Journal of Individualist Thought—which according to Brian Doherty ran a number of stories "favorable to individualist anarchism", such as Roy Child’s article that explained why Ayn Rand's Objectivism “necessarily implied anarchism". In addition, the journal featured an article that proposed a new way of looking at the political spectrum, which was to become an early version of what was later to be known as the Nolan Chart. By 1968, Rampart College had come to a point where they believed they could offer master's degrees to the general public.

== Lecturers at the school and college ==
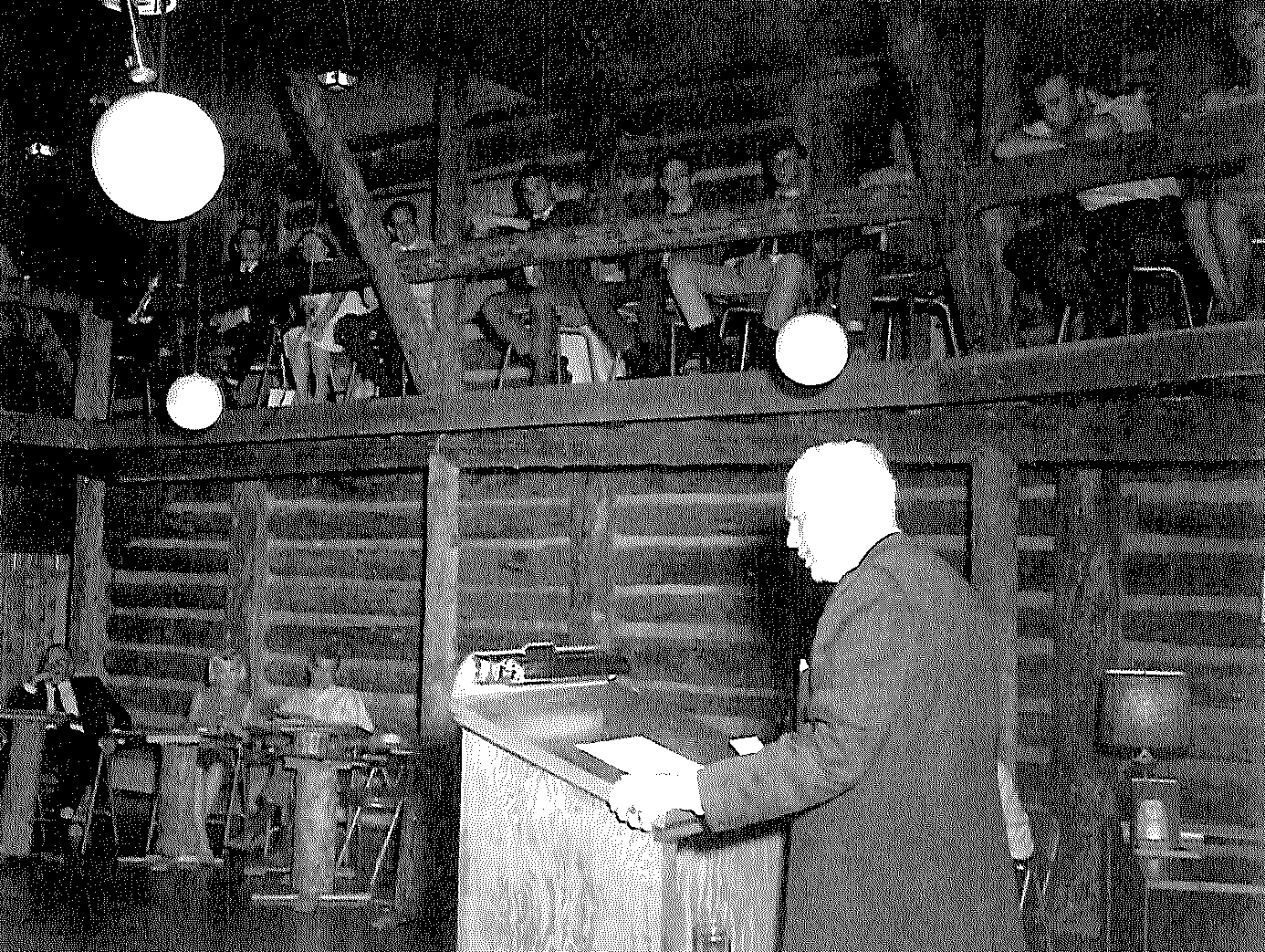
Robert LeFevre lecturing at his Colorado-Springs based school

Over 50 teachers, guest instructors and guest lecturers taught at the school in Colorado. Some of the more notable lecturers included Milton Friedman, Ludwig von Mises, Leonard Read, F. A. Harper, Elgie Marcks, Ellis Lamborn, Frank Chodorov, Hans Sennholz, Raymond C. Hoiles, Percy L. Greaves Jr., Ruth Maynard, Oscar W. Cooley, Raymond C. Hoiles, A. Neil McLeod, and Butler D. Shaffer. According to Doherty, some of the other speakers included Rose Wilder Lane, Gordon Tullock, James M. Buchanan, and Childs.

== Flood and end of Rampart College in Colorado ==
Over 14 inches of rain drenched the Palmer Range above Rampart College on June 16, 1965, and caused a torrent of water to fill the cabins with mud halfway to the roof, causing $150,000 in damages. The flooding and mudslides destroyed most of the campus, which halted its operations. With the school’s total indebtedness of close to $700,000, it became apparent that the entire 320-acre campus had to be sold. Near the end of 1968, the land and facilities of Rampart College, still often referred to as the Freedom School campus, were sold. The property was bought by a religious organization, the Mennonites, who had been searching for a location to use for educational purposes. According to Jeff Riggenbach, who visited the former school in 1981, the facilities looked more like a retreat for troubled boys.

== Rampart College moves to Southern California ==
In November 1968, LeFevre moved to Southern California and took possession of the 7,000 square feet house on two acres in Arcadia, California, under the name of Rampart College. He planned to hold college courses and lectures at the residential property, but was unable to convince city officials to re-zone the property to establish a small college. To resolve this and other problems, LeFevre signed a six-year lease for a suite of offices on the top floor of the First Western Bank Building in Santa Ana and sold the Arcadia property. During this time period, Rampart College produced two 16mm color documentary films, such as Property: A Basis for Morality and The Meaning of Responsibility and Obligation, which were narrated by LeFevre. A number of seminars were conducted across California, including some on the island of Catalina and the Carmel Valley area. In addition, the institute produced two home study courses, the Fundamentals of Liberty and Raising Children for Fun and Profit, along with 50 thirty-minute lectures on cassette tape based on LeFevre’s Fundamentals of Liberty home study course.

In January 1973, LeFevre resigned from Rampart College and turned over its assets and presidency to Leon, an instructor and administrator of the college since 1966. Leon focused on organizing speaking tours for author Harry Browne, managed a series of libertarian programs, and arranged media interviews to promulgate libertarian principles. Within a few years, Leon was unable to make rental payments to keep Rampart College afloat and the college closed its doors. In 1980, LeFevre and others attempted to revive the institution by establishing another school and Freedom library under the name of Rampart Institute. LeFevre died in 1986, before he was able to acquire a new site for a libertarian-orientated college.

== See also ==
- Right-libertarianism
- Unaccredited institutions of higher learning
