= Tax noncompliance =

Range of legal and illegal activities that reduce tax paid

Tax noncompliance is a range of activities that are unfavorable to a government's tax system. This may include tax avoidance, which is tax reduction by legal means, and tax evasion which is the illegal non-payment of tax liabilities. The use of the term "noncompliance" is used differently by different authors. Its most general use describes non-compliant behaviors with respect to different institutional rules resulting in what Edgar L. Feige calls unobserved economies. Non-compliance with fiscal rules of taxation gives rise to unreported income and a tax gap that Feige estimates to be in the neighborhood of $500 billion annually for the United States.

In the United States, the use of the term 'noncompliance' often refers only to illegal misreporting. Laws known as a General Anti-Avoidance Rule (GAAR) statutes which prohibit "tax aggressive" avoidance have been passed in several developed countries including the United States (since 2010), Canada, Australia, New Zealand, South Africa, Norway and Hong Kong. In addition, judicial doctrines have accomplished the similar purpose, notably in the United States through the "business purpose" and "economic substance" doctrines established in Gregory v. Helvering. Though the specifics may vary according to jurisdiction, these rules invalidate tax avoidance which is technically legal but not for a business purpose or in violation of the spirit of the tax code. Related terms for tax avoidance include tax planning and tax sheltering.

Individuals that do not comply with tax payment include tax protesters and tax resisters. Tax protesters attempt to evade the payment of taxes using alternative interpretations of the tax law, while tax resisters refuse to pay a tax for conscientious reasons. In the United States, tax protesters believe that taxation under the Federal Reserve is unconstitutional, while tax resisters are more concerned with not paying for particular government policies that they oppose. Because taxation is often perceived as onerous, governments have struggled with tax noncompliance since the earliest of times.

== Differences between avoidance and evasion ==
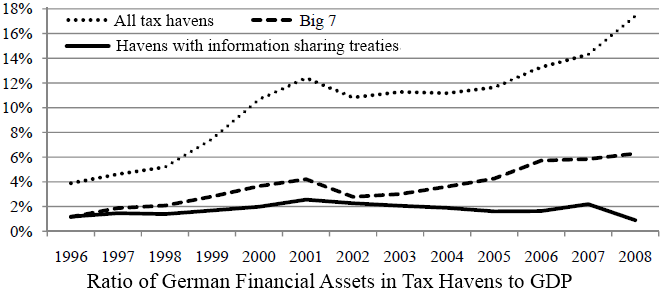
Havens in countries with tax information sharing allowing for compliance enforcement declined in the 2000s. The Big 7 are Hong Kong, Ireland, Lebanon, Liberia, Panama, Singapore, and Switzerland.

The use of the terms tax avoidance and tax evasion can vary depending on the jurisdiction. In general, "evasion" applies to illegal actions and "avoidance" to actions within the law. The term "mitigation" is also used in some jurisdictions to further distinguish actions within the original purpose of the relevant provision from those actions that are within the letter of the law, but do not achieve its purpose. All pursue the same immediate goal, minimising the amount paid.

In particular, in the American legal system, tax evasion is a criminal action disciplined by 26 US Code §7201, under which the taxpayer who fails to pay or willfully underpays his tax liability (i.e., with criminal mens rea like stated in the James v. United States) will undergo criminal penalties. On the other side of the coin, tax avoidance happens when the taxpayer tries to lessen his tax obligation using deductions and credits to maximize after-tax income. All of this is considered legal by the IRS even though it foresees civil penalties. All things considered, the main difference between tax evasion and tax avoidance is the taxpayer's guilty mind of minimization or failure to pay the tax liability.

== Tax gap ==
The U.S. Internal Revenue Service provides formal definitions: "The gross tax gap is the difference between true tax liability for a given tax year and the amount that is paid on time. It is comprised of the nonfiling gap, the underreporting gap, and the underpayment (or remittance) gap. The net tax gap is the portion of the gross tax gap that will never be recovered through enforcement or other late payments."

=== Underground economy and tax gap ===
An important way to study the tax gap is to examine the size of the tax gap in a country by analyzing the size of the underground economy and its influencing factors. The size of the underground economy is directly related to the institutional infrastructure. The institutional infrastructure of a country mainly includes the intensity of government regulation, the establishment and implementation of laws, the degree of judicial independence, the size of effective tax rates, the effective provision of public goods or services, and the effective protection of property rights. It is generally believed that the higher the level of government regulation, the greater the size of its underground economy and the greater the tax gap. And vice versa, when government over-regulation occurs, an alternative relationship exists between the size of the underground economy and the size of the official economy. Representatives of this view are Levenson, Maloney, and Johnson. They believe that higher tax rates can raise higher tax revenues, and the government can provide higher levels of public services accordingly, thereby attracting more companies and individuals out of the underground economy, resulting in a healthy balance of "high tax rates, high taxes, high public services, and small-scale underground economy", but low-tax countries, because they do not have enough income to provide high levels of public services, will form a vicious balance of "low tax rates, low taxes, low public services, and high-scale underground economy." In the above-mentioned healthy balance, the tax gap is relatively small; in the vicious equilibrium, the tax gap is relatively large.

=== Tax customs and tax gaps ===
Tax custom is different from tax avoidance or tax evasion. It does not measure the taxation behavior of individuals, but the tax attitude of individuals. The tax custom can also be considered as the moral responsibility of the individual. Making a specific contribution to society by paying taxes on the government must fulfill this responsibility. It embodies the ethical code of conduct for individuals in taxation, although it does not require the form of law. The decline or deterioration of taxation practices will reduce the moral costs of taxpayers engaging in illegal operations or underground economic activities.

An empirical study by ALM on transition countries such as Russia found that there is a strong negative relationship between tax customary variables and underground economic size variables (which represent tax evasion or tax gaps) (correlation coefficient is -0.657). And both variables are significant at the 1% level.

Bird believed that a sustainable and efficient tax system must be based on perceived fairness and goodwill response to taxation. It must be connected organically with the provision of public goods or services. If taxpayers see their preferences reflected in governance and see efficient provision of government services, they stay in the official economy and fulfill tax obligations. Tax revenues increase while the tax gap narrows.

The economic experiments cited by Torgler and Schaltegger show that the extensive exercise of voting rights in tax affairs will significantly increase taxpayer compliance. The deeper the taxpayer participates in political decision making, the higher the tax contract performance efficiency and tax compliance. The taxpayer society in this state is a civil society with tax and good customs, and the taxpayer is a real citizen who has been given a wide range of powers.

Everest Phillips believes that the design of a reasonable and effective tax system is an important part of the construction in a country. The operation of this tax system must be based on the higher compliance of taxpayers and the goodness of taxation rather than relying on coercive measures. He pointed out that as the country's tax system for building important content must have the following five important characteristics:

1. Political participation. The wide participation of taxpayers in the political decision-making process is an important guarantee for establishing social taxation and good customs. When taxpayers lack effective access to decision-making, they will be concerned about tax revenue collection and the lack of efficiency in the provision of public goods or services. Tax compliance will be reduced, and taxation practices are likely to deteriorate. As a result, tax evasion scale will expand and tax gaps will increase. This situation will further weaken the ability of government to provide public goods or services, and thus trap the construction process into a vicious cycle.
2. Responsibility and transparency. The government should have a legitimate duty to use tax revenues, and procedures for providing public goods or services should be transparent to taxpayers.
3. Perceivable fairness. In a reasonable and effective tax system, taxpayers can perceive themselves as being treated equally and justly. With regard to tax incentives or tax exemptions, if taxpayers perceive that they are being treated unfairly, their tax willingness will inevitably decline.
4. Effectiveness. The government should have the ability to transform gradually increasing tax revenues into higher levels of public goods or services and enhance political stability.
5. Sharing a prosperous political commitment. The national taxation system should be closely linked with the national goal of promoting economic growth. Promoting economic growth is one of the strategic goals that the government has promised to taxpayers. The government can promote the realization of this strategic goal through taxation.

=== Tax collection management efficiency and tax gap ===
U.S. Treasury Department estimates of unpaid taxes indicate that over half of all unpaid taxes are attributable to the top 5% of earners.

Under the premise of economic development level, the ability of a country to raise tax revenue is mainly determined by the tax system design in the country and the efficiency of its collection and management. From the perspective of taxation practices in various countries, the design of taxation system is affected and restricted by the efficiency of tax collection and management. Therefore, it can be said that the relative size of a country's tax revenue collection and tax gap is closely related to the tax collection and management efficiency of the s tax administration agencies in the country.

A reasonable explanation for the introduction of value-added tax by most developing countries in the world is to increase the taxpayer's compliance with tax payment through the mutual supervision mechanism between taxpayers without increasing the cost imposed by the tax administration authorities. This consideration for the factors of taxation determines that developing countries can only adopt the tax system that is mainly based on turnover tax. From the perspective of taxation, due to restrictions on the level of taxation in developing countries, tax revenues can only be raised through indirect taxes that focus on taxes such as value-added tax and consumption tax, while direct taxes represented by income taxes and property taxes are included in total tax revenue. The proportion is relatively low. Bird and Zolt pointed out that, contrary to the practice of taxation in developed countries, personal income tax still plays a very limited role in developing countries today, both in terms of income mobilization and adjustment of income disparities. In 2000, the income tax income of developed countries was 53.8% of total income, compared with 28.3% in developing countries. They believe that wages and other income of workers in the informal sector in developing countries are still free from tax collection. The same is true of the property tax situation. Due to the lack of necessary information and assessment mechanisms for the assessment of property values, property taxes cannot be successfully implemented in many developing countries; even if developing countries with property taxes exist, their income collection is still insufficient. From the above analysis, we can see that compared with indirect taxes, developing countries still have a large tax gap in terms of direct taxes.

==== Tax protesters and tax resisters ====
Some tax evaders believe that they have uncovered new interpretations of the law that show that they are not subject to being taxed (not liable): these individuals and groups are sometimes called tax protesters. Many protesters continue posing the same arguments that the federal courts have rejected time and time again, ruling the arguments to be legally frivolous.

Tax resistance is the refusal to pay a tax for conscientious reasons (because the resister finds the government or its actions morally reprehensible). They typically do not find it relevant whether that the tax laws are themselves legal or illegal or whether they apply to them, and they are more concerned with not paying for what they find to be grossly immoral, such as the bombing of innocents.

== United States ==
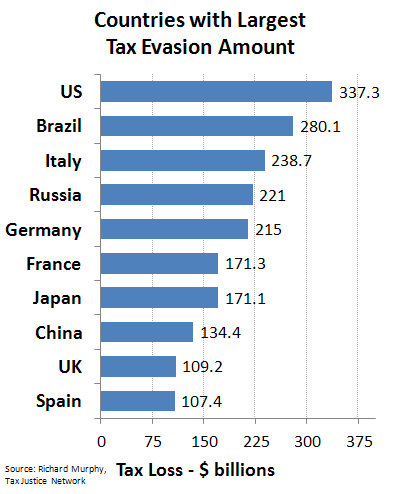
Tax campaigner Richard Murphy's estimate of the ten countries with the largest absolute levels of tax evasion. He estimated that global tax evasion amounts to 5 percent of the global economy.

In the United States "tax evasion" is evading the assessment or payment of a tax that is already legally owed at the time of the criminal conduct. Tax evasion is criminal, and has no effect on the amount of tax actually owed, although it may give rise to substantial monetary penalties.

By contrast, the term "tax avoidance" describes lawful conduct, the purpose of which is to avoid the creation of a tax liability in the first place. Whereas an evaded tax remains a tax legally owed, an avoided tax is a tax liability that has never existed.

For example, consider two businesses, each of which have a particular asset (in this case, a piece of real estate) that is worth far more than its purchase price.

- Business One (or an individual) sells the property and underreports its gain. In this instance, tax is legally due. Business One has engaged in tax evasion, which is criminal.
- Business Two (or an individual) consults with a tax advisor and discovers that the business can structure a sale as a "like-kind exchange" (formally known as a 1031 exchange, named after the Code section) for other real estate that the business can use. In this instance, no tax is due of the provisions of section 1031 of the Internal Revenue Code. Business Two has engaged in tax avoidance (or tax mitigation), which is completely within the law.

In the above example, tax may or may not eventually be due when the second property is sold. Whether and how much tax will be due will depend on circumstances and the state of the law at the time.

=== Definition of tax evasion in the United States ===
The application of the U.S. tax evasion statute may be illustrated in brief as follows. The statute is Internal Revenue Code section 7201:

Any person who willfully attempts in any manner to evade or defeat any tax imposed by this title or the payment thereof shall, in addition to other penalties provided by law, be guilty of a felony and, upon conviction thereof, shall be fined not more than $100,000 ($500,000 in the case of a corporation), or imprisoned not more than 5 years, or both, together with the costs of prosecution.

Under this statute and related case law, the prosecution must prove, beyond a reasonable doubt, each of the following three elements:

1. the "attendant circumstance" of the existence of a tax deficiency – an unpaid tax liability; and
2. the actus reus (i.e., guilty conduct) – an affirmative act (and not merely an omission or failure to act) in any manner constituting evasion or an attempt to evade either:
  1. the assessment of a tax, or
  2. the payment of a tax.
3. the mens rea or "mental" element of willfulness – the specific intent to violate an actually known legal duty.

An affirmative act "in any manner" is sufficient to satisfy the third element of the offense. That is, an act which would otherwise be perfectly legal (such as moving funds from one bank account to another) could be grounds for a tax evasion conviction (possibly an attempt to evade payment), provided the other two elements are also met. Intentionally filing a false tax return (a separate crime in itself) could constitute an attempt to evade the assessment of the tax, as the Internal Revenue Service bases its initial assessment (i.e., the formal recordation of the tax on the books of the U.S. Treasury) on the tax amount shown on the return.

=== Application to tax protesters ===
The federal tax evasion statute is an example of an exception to the general rule under U.S. law that "ignorance of the law or a mistake of law is no defense to criminal prosecution". Under the Cheek Doctrine (Cheek v. United States), the United States Supreme Court ruled that a genuine, good faith belief that one is not violating the federal tax law (such as a mistake based on a misunderstanding caused by the complexity of the tax law itself) would be a valid defense to a charge of "willfulness" ("willfulness" in this case being knowledge or awareness that one is violating the tax law itself), even though that belief is irrational or unreasonable. On the surface, this rule might appear to be of some comfort to tax protesters who assert, for example, that "wages are not income."

However, merely asserting that one has such a good faith belief is not determinative in court; under the American legal system the trier of fact (the jury, or the trial judge in a non-jury trial) decides whether the defendant really has the good faith belief he or she claims. With respect to willfulness, the placing of the burden of proof on the prosecution is of limited utility to a defendant that the jury simply does not believe.

A further stumbling block for tax protesters is found in the Cheek Doctrine with respect to arguments about "constitutionality." Under the Doctrine, the belief that the Sixteenth Amendment was not properly ratified and the belief that the federal income tax is otherwise unconstitutional are not treated as beliefs that one is not violating the "tax law" – i.e., these errors are not treated as being caused by the "complexity of the tax law."

In the Cheek case the Court stated:

Claims that some of the provisions of the tax code are unconstitutional are submissions of a different order. They do not arise from innocent mistakes caused by the complexity of the Internal Revenue Code. Rather, they reveal full knowledge of the provisions at issue and a studied conclusion, however wrong, that those provisions are invalid and unenforceable. Thus, in this case, Cheek paid his taxes for years, but after attending various seminars and based on his own study, he concluded that the income tax laws could not constitutionally require him to pay a tax.

The Court continued:

We do not believe that Congress contemplated that such a taxpayer, without risking criminal prosecution, could ignore the duties imposed upon him by the Internal Revenue Code and refuse to utilize the mechanisms provided by Congress to present his claims of invalidity to the courts and to abide by their decisions. There is no doubt that Cheek, from year to year, was free to pay the tax that the law purported to require, file for a refund and, if denied, present his claims of invalidity, constitutional or otherwise, to the courts. See 26 U.S.C. 7422. Also, without paying the tax, he could have challenged claims of tax deficiencies in the Tax Court, 6213, with the right to appeal to a higher court if unsuccessful. 7482(a)(1). Cheek took neither course in some years, and, when he did, was unwilling to accept the outcome. As we see it, he is in no position to claim that his good-faith belief about the validity of the Internal Revenue Code negates willfulness or provides a defense to criminal prosecution under 7201 and 7203. Of course, Cheek was free in this very case to present his claims of invalidity and have them adjudicated, but, like defendants in criminal cases in other contexts who "willfully" refuse to comply with the duties placed upon them by the law, he must take the risk of being wrong.

The Court ruled that such beliefs – even if held in good faith – are not a defense to a charge of willfulness. By pointing out that arguments about constitutionality of federal income tax laws "reveal full knowledge of the provisions at issue and a studied conclusion, however wrong, that those provisions are invalid and unenforceable", the Supreme Court may have been impliedly warning that asserting such "constitutional" arguments (in open court or otherwise) might actually help the prosecutor prove willfulness. Daniel B. Evans, a tax lawyer who has written about tax protester arguments, has stated that

if you plan ahead to use it [the Cheek defense], then it is almost certain to fail, because your efforts to establish your "good faith belief" are going to be used by the government as evidence that you knew that what you were doing was wrong when you did it, which is why you worked to set up a defense in advance. Planning not to file tax returns and avoid prosecution using a "good faith belief" is kind of like planning to kill someone using a claim of "self-defense". If you've planned in advance, then it shouldn't work.

By contrast, under Canadian law, the honesty of a taxpayer in expressing his beliefs can be a mitigating factor in sentencing. In R. v. Klundert , 2011 ONCA 646, the Ontario Court of Appeal upheld a tax protestor's conviction, but allowed him to serve a conditional sentence in the community on the grounds that his behaviour was neither fraudulent nor deceitful. The one-year custodial sentence imposed by the trial judge was overturned on this basis:

[23] He went on to hold that, while deceit or fraud may be an aggravating factor, the absence of such features does not create a mitigating factor. While that may be an acceptable general rule of sentencing, the absence of deceit or fraud can nevertheless be a factor in deciding whether or not a conditional sentence is warranted. To the extent the trial judge did consider the appellant's low level of deceit, if any, and lack of fraud, it was not fairly emphasized in his reasons and amounts to error.

=== Failing to file returns in the United States ===
According to some estimates, about three percent of American taxpayers do not file tax returns at all. In the case of U.S. federal income taxes, civil penalties for willful failure to timely file returns and willful failure to timely pay taxes are based on the amount of tax due; thus, if no tax is owed, no penalties are due. The civil penalty for willful failure to timely file a return is generally equal to 5.0% of the amount of tax "required to be shown on the return per month, up to a maximum of 25%.

In cases where a taxpayer does not have enough money to pay the entire tax bill, the IRS can work out a payment plan with taxpayers, or enter into a collection alternative such as a partial payment Installment Agreement, an Offer in Compromise, placement into hardship or "currently non-collectable" status or file bankruptcy.

For years for which no return has been filed, there is no statute of limitations on civil actions – that is, on how long the IRS can seek taxpayers and demand payment of taxes owed.

For each year a taxpayer willfully fails to timely file an income tax return, the taxpayer can be sentenced to one year in prison. In general, there is a six-year statute of limitations on federal tax crimes.

The IRS has run several Overseas Voluntary Disclosure Programs in 2009 and 2011, and its current one has "no set deadline for taxpayers to apply. However, the terms of this program could change at any time going forward.".

By contrast, the civil penalty for failure to timely pay the tax actually "shown on the return" is generally equal to 0.5% of such tax due per month, up to a maximum of 25%. The two penalties are computed together in a relatively complex algorithm, and computing the actual penalties due is somewhat challenging.

== United Kingdom ==
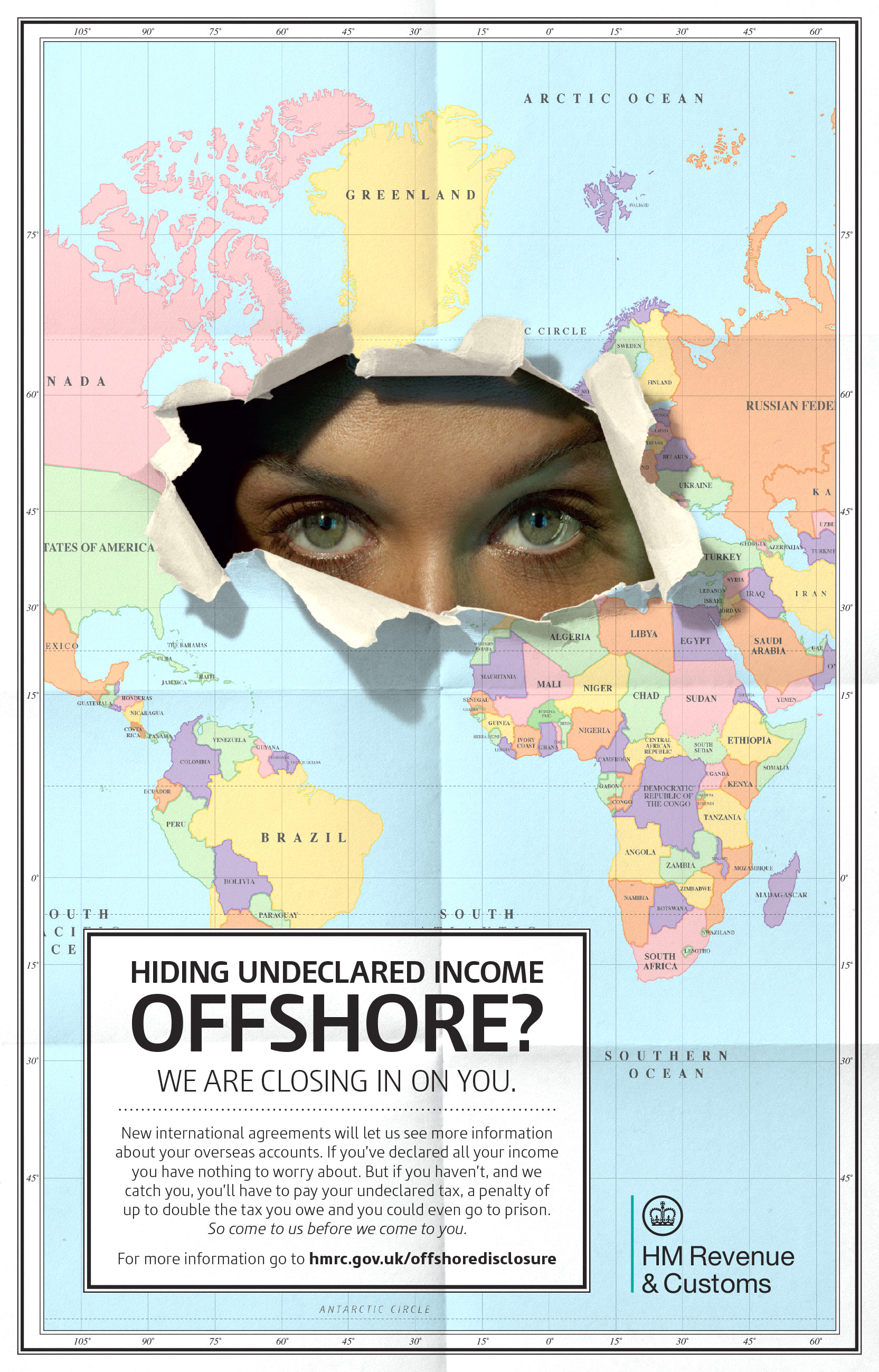
Poster issued by the British tax authorities to counter offshore tax evasion

The United Kingdom and jurisdictions following the UK approach (such as New Zealand) have recently adopted the evasion/avoidance terminology as used in the United States: evasion is a criminal attempt to avoid paying tax owed while avoidance is an attempt to use the law to reduce taxes owed. There is, however, a further distinction drawn between tax avoidance and tax mitigation. Tax avoidance is a course of action designed to conflict with or defeat the evident intention of Parliament: IRC v Willoughby.

Tax mitigation is conduct which reduces tax liabilities without "tax avoidance" (not contrary to the intention of Parliament), for instance, by gifts to charity or investments in certain assets which qualify for tax relief. This is important for tax provisions which apply in cases of "avoidance": they are held not to apply in cases of mitigation.

The clear articulation of the concept of an avoidance/mitigation distinction goes back only to the 1970s. The concept originated from economists, not lawyers. The use of the terminology avoidance/mitigation to express this distinction was an innovation in 1986: IRC v Challenge.

The difference between tax avoidance and tax evasion is the thickness of a prison wall.

— Denis Healey, The Economist, Volume 354, p. 186

In practice, the distinction is sometimes clear, but often difficult to draw. Relevant factors to decide whether conduct is avoidance or mitigation include: whether there is a specific tax regime applicable; whether transactions have economic consequences; confidentiality; tax linked fees. Important indicia are familiarity and use. Once a tax avoidance arrangement becomes common, it is almost always stopped by legislation within a few years. If something commonly done is contrary to the intention of Parliament, it is only to be expected that Parliament will stop it.

So that which is commonly done and not stopped is not likely to be contrary to the intention of Parliament. It follows that tax reduction arrangements which have been carried on for a long time are unlikely to constitute tax avoidance. Judges have a strong intuitive sense that that which everyone does, and has long done, should not be stigmatised with the pejorative term of "avoidance". Thus UK courts refused to regard sales and repurchases (known as bed-and-breakfast transactions) or back-to-back loans as tax avoidance.

Other approaches in distinguishing tax avoidance and tax mitigation are to seek to identify "the spirit of the statute" or "misusing" a provision. But this is the same as the "evident intention of Parliament" properly understood. Another approach is to seek to identify "artificial" transactions. However, a transaction is not well described as "artificial" if it has valid legal consequences, unless some standard can be set up to establish what is "natural" for the same purpose. Such standards are not readily discernible. The same objection applies to the term "device".

It may be that a concept of "tax avoidance" based on what is contrary to "the intention of Parliament" is not coherent. The object of construction of any statute is expressed as finding "the intention of Parliament". In any successful tax avoidance scheme, a Court must have concluded that the intention of Parliament was not to impose a tax charge in the circumstances which the tax avoiders had placed themselves. The answer is that the expression "intention of Parliament" is being used in two senses.

It is perfectly consistent to say that a tax avoidance scheme escapes tax (there being no provision to impose a tax charge) and yet constitutes the avoidance of tax. One is seeking the intention of Parliament at a higher, more generalised level. A statute may fail to impose a tax charge, leaving a gap that a court cannot fill even by purposive construction, but nevertheless one can conclude that there would have been a tax charge had the point been considered. An example is the notorious UK case Ayrshire Employers Mutual Insurance Association v IRC, where the House of Lords held that Parliament had "missed fire".

=== History of avoidance/evasion distinction ===
An avoidance/evasion distinction along the lines of the present distinction has long been recognised but at first there was no terminology to express it. In 1860 Turner LJ suggested evasion/contravention (where evasion stood for the lawful side of the divide): Fisher v Brierly. In 1900 the distinction was noted as two meanings of the word "evade": Bullivant v AG. The technical use of the words avoidance/evasion in the modern sense originated in the US where it was well established by the 1920s. It can be traced to Oliver Wendell Holmes in Bullen v. Wisconsin.

It was slow to be accepted in the United Kingdom. By the 1950s, knowledgeable and careful writers in the UK had come to distinguish the term "tax evasion" from "avoidance". However, in the UK at least, "evasion" was regularly used (by modern standards, misused) in the sense of avoidance, in law reports and elsewhere, at least up to the 1970s. Now that the terminology has received official approval in the UK (Craven v White) this usage should be regarded as erroneous. But even now it is often helpful to use the expressions "legal avoidance" and "illegal evasion", to make the meaning clearer.

=== UK tax gap ===
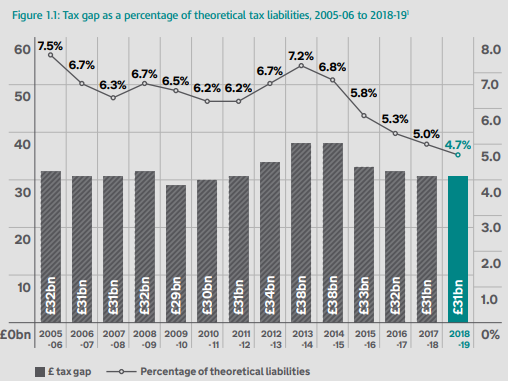
HMRC estimated tax gaps 2005–2019

The UK "tax gap" is the difference between the amount of tax that should, in theory, be collected by the tax collection agency HMRC, against what is actually collected. The tax gap for the UK in 2018/19 was £31 billion, or 4.7% of total tax liabilities. It has subsequently grown to £59.2bn in 2024-25, with HMRC attributing 62% of this to 'small business'.

=== UK tax resistors ===
In the UK case of Cheney v. Conn, an individual objected to paying tax that, in part, would be used to procure nuclear arms in unlawful contravention, he contended, of the Geneva Convention. His claim was dismissed, the judge ruling that "What the [taxation] statute itself enacts cannot be unlawful, because what the statute says and provides is itself the law, and the highest form of law that is known to this country."

== France ==
France can be considered as having an average level of the European fiscal evasion (in terms of percentage of GDP) but in the upper ranks of the absolute level due to its high GDP. Indeed, the state budget is slashed by more than 160 billion euros every year (80 billion is slashed due to fiscal evasion and another 80 billion due to the abuse of social protection). The fiscal evasion is equivalent to 3% of the French GDP and the social protection is another 3%. In total, the French government is slashed of 6% of the country's GDP.

== Europe ==
Richard Murphy, a professor in Public Policy at City, University of London, produced the following estimates of the tax gap in different European countries.

Country	Tax gap (billion €)	Tax gap per GDP (%)	Tax gap as a proportion of the health care budget (%)
Italy	190,9	23,28	172,3
Germany	125,1	10,10	44,0
France	117,9	11,09	61,0
United Kingdom	87,5	9,63	43,1
Spain	60,0	14,71	85,4
Poland	34,6	21,66	181,0
Belgium	30,4	14,99	93,5
Netherlands	22,2	8,29	38,5
Greece	19,9	26,11	235,7
Denmark	17,5	12,84	74,2
Sweden	16,9	8,07	40,9
Romania	16,2	29,51	262,0
Austria	12,9	8,25	48,7
Portugal	11,0	16,09	103,1
Finland	10,7	10,92	69,8
Hungary	9,1	18,78	171,7
Czech Republic	8,8	14,15	87,6
Ireland	6,9	10,57	49,7
Slovakia	5,4	18,52	125,0
Bulgaria	3,8	24,20	197,6
Croatia	3,5	18,43	139,9
Lithuania	3,1	24,36	187,4
Slovenia	2,6	16,28	109,8
Latvia	1,7	20,03	214,6
Cyprus	1,6	21,61	302,9
Luxembourg	1,6	7,98	60,7
Estonia	1,4	16,99	135,4
Malta	0,9	25,42	-

== See also ==
=== By region ===
- Tax evasion and corruption in Greece
- Tax evasion in Switzerland
- Tax gap in the UK
- Tax evasion in the United States
- Other countries
- Tax fraud schemes and detection

=== General ===
- Black market
- Bottom of the harbour tax avoidance (Australia)
- Corporate inversion
- Double Irish arrangement
- e-commerce
- Financial transaction tax (less susceptible to evasion)
- Fiscal capacity
- Gaming the system
- Eva Joly
- Land value tax (less susceptible to evasion)
- Richard Murphy (accountant)
- Stop Tax Haven Abuse Act
- Tax deduction
- Tax exile
- Tax farming
- Tax incidence
- Tax loophole
- Tax patent
- Tax protester (United States)
- Tax reform
- Taxation as slavery
- Taxation as theft
- Xenon (program)
