= Xenon (program) =

Web crawler

Xenon is software to perform covert Internet searches and surveillance, presently in use by taxing authorities in at least six nations to investigate the possibilities of tax evasion by various revenue producing web sites (online shops, gambling sites, or pornography sites) and clients selling goods on on-line auction sites. The software uses time-controlled web spiders to avoid detection, and likely countermeasures, by the webmasters of the targeted site. Its use may be legal; but citizen's right to privacy and other civil liberties are implicated.

== History ==
Use of Xenon was begun in the Netherlands in 2004, by the Dutch tax authority Belastingdienst. The Amsterdam-based data mining firm Sentient Machine Research, together with the tax authorities of Austria, Canada, Denmark, and the United Kingdom, has since upgraded the system. Sweden's tax authority began using Xenon in 2007.

== Civil liberties ==
Swedish privacy advocate and IT expert Par Strom, while stating in 2007 that the anticipated use of Xenon by the Swedish tax authority Skatteverket would be legal, has also stated that such use would pose dangers to citizen privacy rights—as did the current use at the time of similar spidering software developed internally by the Swedish government. Canadian Internet law expert Michael Geist has expressed similar privacy concerns.
