= Taxation as theft =

Concept in libertarian thought

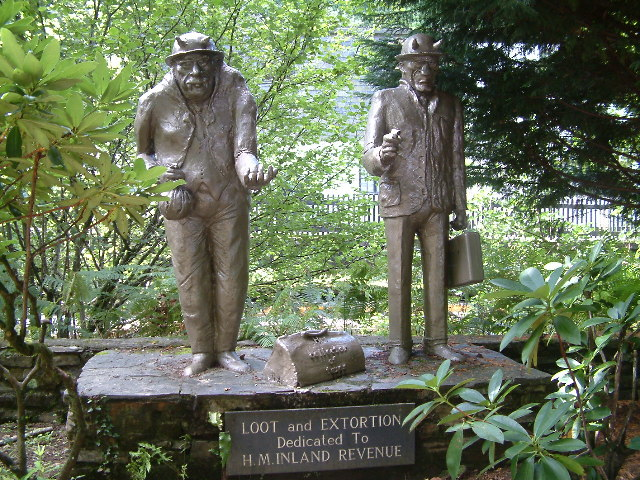
Loot and Extortion. Statues at Trago Mills (near Liskeard, Cornwall), dedicated to the UK Inland Revenue service

The position that taxation is theft, and therefore immoral, is found in a number of political philosophies. The position is often held by anarcho-capitalists, objectivists, most minarchists, right-wing libertarians, and voluntaryists, as well as left-wing anarchists, libertarian socialists and some anarcho-communists and right-wing anarchists.

Proponents of this position see taxation as a violation of the non-aggression principle. Under this view, government transgresses property rights by enforcing compulsory tax collection, regardless of what the amount may be. Some opponents of taxation, like Michael Huemer, argue that rightful ownership of property should be based on what he calls "natural property rights", not those determined by the law of the state.

Defenders of taxation argue that the notions of both legal private property rights and theft are defined by the legal framework of the state, and thus taxation by the state does not represent a violation of property law, unless the tax itself is illegal. Some defenders of taxation, such as socialist Matt Bruenig, argue that the phrase "taxation is theft" is question-begging, since it relies on presupposing a particular theory of property entitlement.

== History ==
In the 17th century, John Locke took the position in Second Treatise of Government that government authority arises from the consent of the governed, and not through the divine right of kings. The libertarian activist L. K. Samuels, asserts in his "Rulers' Paradox" that since the citizenry is the holder of all rights, governmental bodies derive their authority to govern society via elections of government officials. In that vein, Samuels maintains that citizens can only give rights which they have. The Rulers' Paradox comes into play when governmental bodies exercise rights that the citizens do not hold or could not hold. According to Samuels: "If ordinary citizens could assassinate, steal, imprison, torture, kidnap, and wiretap without incrimination, that authority could be transferred to government for its democratic arsenal of policymaking weaponry." Taxation could be viewed as theft since, according to Lockean natural rights doctrine, government authority must obtain their rights from the citizenry.

Lysander Spooner, a 19th-century lawyer and political philosopher, who had argued before the United States Supreme Court, wrote the essay No Treason: The Constitution of No Authority. In it he stated that a supposed social contract cannot be used to justify governmental actions such as taxation, because government will initiate force against anyone who does not wish to enter into such a contract.

No open, avowed, or responsible association, or body of men, can say this to him; because there is no such association or body of men in existence. If any one should assert that there is such an association, let him prove, if he can, who compose it. Let him produce, if he can, any open, written, or other authentic contract, signed or agreed to by these men; forming themselves into an association; making themselves known as such to the world; appointing him as their agent; and making themselves individually, or as an association, responsible for his acts, done by their authority. Until all this can be shown, no one can say that, in any legitimate sense, there is any such association; or that he is their agent; or that he ever gave his oath to them; or ever pledged his faith to them.

The 19th-century French economist Frédéric Bastiat described taxes as legal plunder. Bastiat held that the state's only legitimate function was to protect the life, liberty, and property of the individual.

Now, legal plunder may be exercised in an infinite multitude of ways. Hence come an infinite multitude of plans for organization; tariffs, protection, perquisites, gratuities, encouragements, progressive taxation, free public education, right to work, right to profit, right to wages, right to assistance, right to instruments of labor, gratuity of credit, etc., etc. And it is all these plans, taken as a whole, with what they have in common, legal plunder, that takes the name of socialism.

Murray Rothbard argued in The Ethics of Liberty in 1982 that taxation is theft and that tax resistance is therefore legitimate: "Just as no one is morally required to answer a robber truthfully when he asks if there are any valuables in one's house, so no one can be morally required to answer truthfully similar questions asked by the state, e.g., when filling out income tax returns."

Andrew Napolitano attempts to justify the position that "taxation is theft" in his book It Is Dangerous to Be Right When the Government Is Wrong where he asks a series of rhetorical questions like "Is it theft if one man steals a car?" and "What if a gang of ten men take a vote (allowing the victim to vote as well) on whether to steal the car before stealing it?", showing what he believes are similarities between theft and taxation.

== Response ==
Liam Murphy and Thomas Nagel assert that since property rights are determined by laws and conventions, of which the state forms an integral part, taxation by the state cannot be considered theft. In their 2002 book, The Myth of Ownership: Taxes and Justice, they argue:

...the emphasis on distributing the tax burden relative to pretax income is a fundamental mistake. Taxation does not take from people what they already own. Property rights are the product of a set of laws and conventions, of which the tax system forms a central part, so the fairness of taxes can’t be evaluated by their impact on preexisting entitlements. Pretax income has no independent moral significance. Standards of justice should be applied not to the distribution of tax burdens but to the operation and results of the entire framework of economic institutions.

Another justification of taxation is contained in social contract theory. Proponents argue that the public has democratically allowed people to accumulate wealth with the understanding that a portion of that wealth would be allocated for public use. In their view, to accumulate wealth without taxation would be to violate this social understanding. Institutions such as the IMF and economist Alex Cobham, of the Tax Justice Network, argue that since public services in the form of education and infrastructure provides a foundation for wealth creation, a portion of those economic gains should therefore be used to continue to fund basic provisions that provide the opportunity for future economic growth.

== See also ==
- Economic oppression
- Excess burden of taxation
- Geolibertarianism
  - Land value tax (proposed exception)
- List of countries by tax revenue as percentage of GDP
- No taxation without representation
- Non-aggression principle
- Property is theft!
- Property rights (economics)
- Tax haven
- Tax noncompliance
- Tax protester arguments
- Tax resistance in the United States
- Taxation as slavery
- Views on taxation
- Voluntary taxation
