= Facets of Liberty =

1985 painting by Anthony Quinn

- Artist: Anthony Quinn
- Year: 1985
- Subject: New York City, Statue of Liberty
- Owner: Glenn Harte

Facets of Liberty is an oil painting by Anthony Quinn, a Mexican-American artist, more well known as an actor and filmmaker. Quinn created the work in 1985 to coincide with the celebration of the 100-year anniversary of the Statue of Liberty in 1986. The statue is featured prominently in the painting as a silhouette in the background and Lady Liberty's face on the center left as part of a montage with another unidentified face in the foreground.

== Creation and composition ==
Facets of Liberty was created by Anthony Quinn in 1985. Quinn was an actor and filmmaker, known for playing the title role in Zorba the Greek and Paul Gauguin in Lust for Life, for both of which he won Academy Awards, and the Mexican revolutionary Eufemio Zapata in Viva Zapata! The actor was a painter throughout his life, and there are works attributed to him from as early as the 1940s.

Quinn created Facets of Liberty to coincide with the celebration of the 100-year anniversary of the Statue of Liberty which features prominently in the painting. He had intended for the work to be celebratory and patriotic. However, the final work was more subdued and not as joyful as the artist originally intended. The painting features the head and face of Lady Liberty in a montage with another more obscured face superimposed on the viewer's right. A shadowy silhouette of the Statue of Liberty also appears in the background on the right side of the painting.

Soon after its creation, the painting was scanned for printing, and the original was sold. In 1986, a series of limited edition lithographs were created from the scan of the original; each lithograph was signed with a pencil by Quinn before sale.

The original painting is currently held at a gallery owned by Glenn Harte in Maui. Harte opened the gallery in 2004 to feature many of Quinn's artwork.
