= Taxation as slavery =

Libertarian criticism of taxes

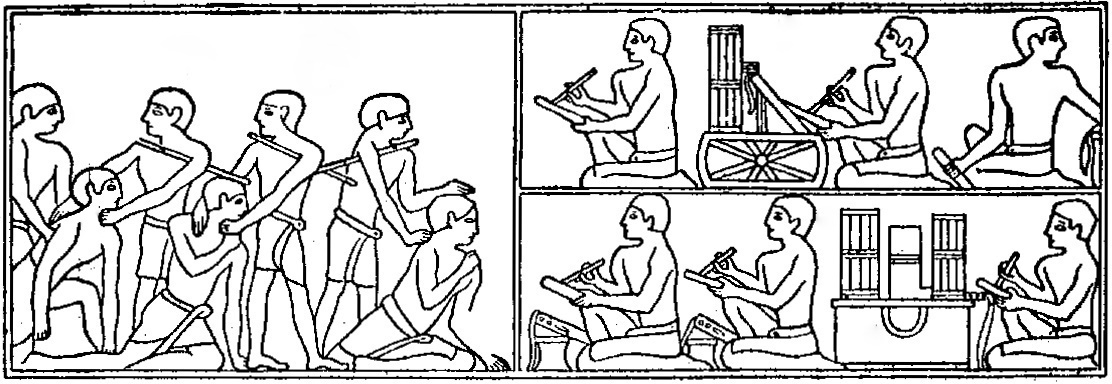
Egyptian peasants seized for non-payment of taxes during the Pyramid Age

Taxation as slavery is a libertarian and anarcho-capitalist rhetorical argument that equates compulsory taxation with a form of involuntary servitude or slavery. Proponents claim that because individuals are legally required to surrender a portion of their income or labor to the government under threat of penalty, they are effectively forced to work for the benefit of the state or others rather than solely for themselves. The analogy is most commonly associated with right-libertarian thinkers, including some anarcho-capitalists, and has historical roots in opposition to taxation without representation, such as during the American Revolution. Critics argue that the comparison is misleading, as modern taxation occurs within democratic systems, funds public goods, and does not involve ownership of persons or physical coercion comparable to chattel slavery. The concept is considered a fringe viewpoint in mainstream political and economic discourse.

== History ==
Historically, the earliest and most widespread form of taxation was the corvee, which can be traced back to the beginning of civilization. The corvee was state-imposed forced labor on peasants too poor to pay other forms of taxation (labor in ancient Egyptian is a synonym for taxes).

While slavery was a part of life in ancient Egypt, the Mediterranean, Rome, and Greece etc., many slaves received wages. For example, in some of the first records of taxation and slavery from over 5000 years, we see evidence that Egyptian Pharaohs only collected 20% tax on grain harvests, and yet the subjects were considered slaves at this high level of taxation, as is recorded in the book of Genesis 41:34-36

"Let Pharaoh appoint commissioners over the land to take a fifth of the harvest of Egypt during the seven years of abundance. They should collect all the food of these good years that are coming and store up the grain under the authority of Pharaoh, to be kept in the cities for food."

In her book, American Patriots, journalist Gail Buckley wrote, "In British eyes, the American colonies existed only for the benefit of the mother country, but Americans saw any form of taxation as slavery." Anarcho-capitalists and other right-libertarians often argue taxation is equivalent to slavery. The International Society for Individual Liberty has made this claim, as has Bureaucrash, referring to Social Security as "social slavery."

George Mason University professor Thomas Rustici uses two hypothetical anecdotes to illustrate his point of view:

In the first, Sam Slime mugs a person for £50. In the second, Sam Slime votes for a politician who taxes a person in order to redistribute £50 to the "disadvantaged" Slime. Both examples involve the use of force. However, the second scenario is arguably worse, since through the state, Slime is now empowered to repeatedly take others' money, thus putting them in a condition of slavery."

Leo Tolstoy argued that taxation of labor is one of three stages of slavery (the other two being land slavery and personal slavery).

== See also ==
- Chibalo
- George Fitzhugh
- Income tax
- Political ethics
- Redeemers
- The Road to Serfdom
- Self-ownership
- Serfdom
- Taxation as theft
- Tax noncompliance
- Tax protester history
- Voluntary taxation
