= Robert LeFevre =

American businessman and political pundit (1911–1986)

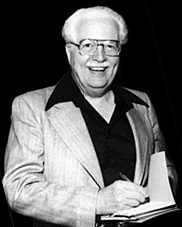
- Born: Robert LeFevre; October 13, 1911; Gooding, Idaho, United States
- Died: May 13, 1986 (aged 74); United States
- Occupations: businessman, activism, radio personality
- Known for: Autarchism; Flag of anarcho-capitalism Freedom School
- Movement: Libertarianism

Signature
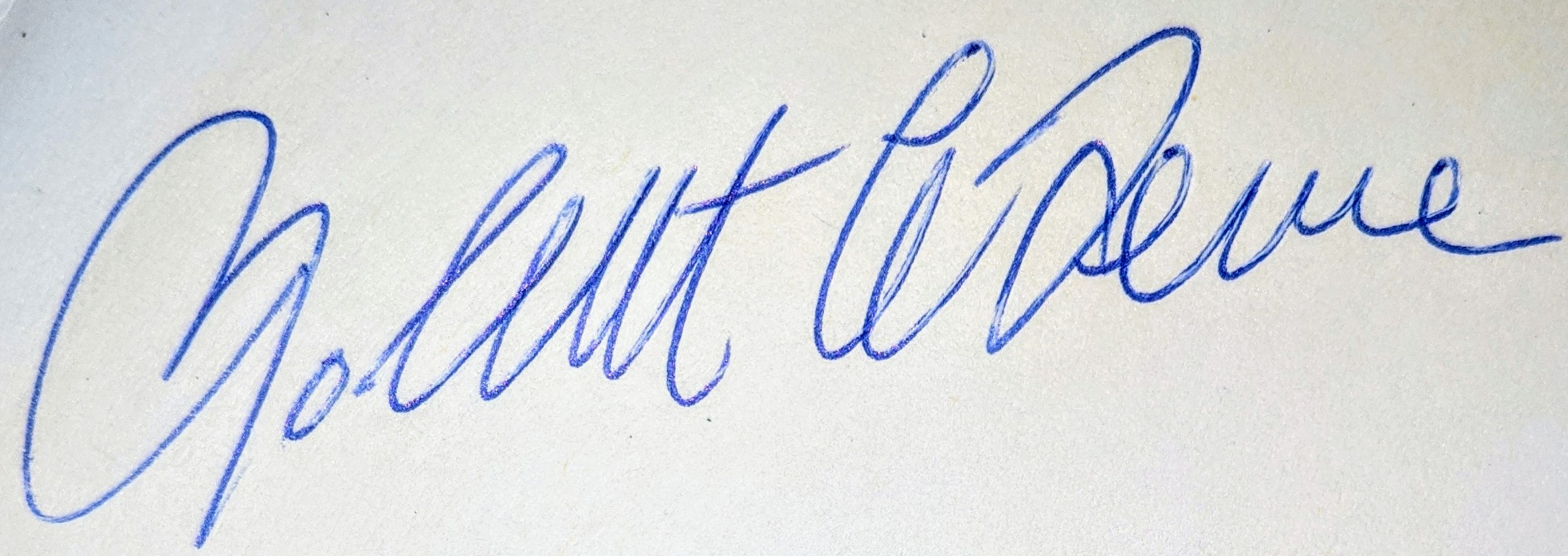

Robert LeFevre (October 13, 1911 – May 13, 1986) was an American libertarian and conservative businessman, radio personality, and primary theorist of autarchism. He also supported classical liberalism. He is considered by the Mises Institute to have been a "right-wing Tolstoyan" and a pacifist libertarian.

== Early life ==
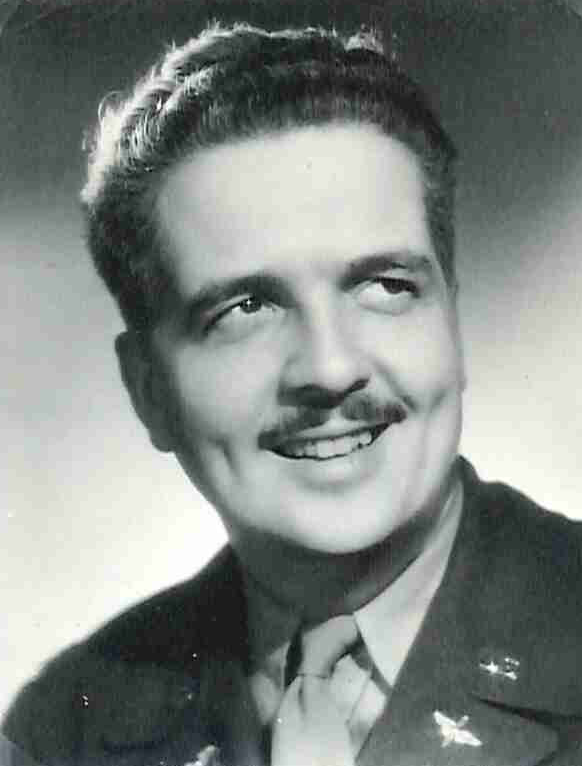
Robert LeFevre in U.S. military uniform, 1944

LeFevre was born in Gooding, Idaho, on October 13, 1911, but when he was still a child his family moved to Minneapolis, Minnesota. LeFevre attended Hamline University studying English and drama. He then worked at a variety of jobs during the Great Depression, such as acting and radio announcing. For a short time, LeFevre was a Shakespearean actor.

LeFevre was a follower of the "I AM" movement from 1936 to 1940 or so. He and one Pearl Diehl wrote a book in 1940 of their experiences in the organization called "I AM" – America's Destiny (Twin City House, St. Paul, Minnesota). LeFevre told how one day, when he was in the radio station studio, he was struck by the Great I AM presence, who spoke to him personally. LeFevre also claimed a number of supernatural experiences: driving a car while asleep for over twenty miles without an accident (this was accomplished with the help of his "Higher Mental Body"), leaving his physical body for a trip through the air to Mount Shasta, and seeing Jesus.

In 1940, I AM leaders Edna Ballard and her son Donald were indicted by a grand jury in Los Angeles for use of the mails to defraud. Twenty-four other I AM leaders were also named in the first indictment; a supplemental indictment named LeFevre and Diehl as defendants. During World War II, LeFevre served as an officer in the education and orientation division of the Army Air Corps before being discharged in 1945 after spending a year in Europe and being injured in an accident. Soon after, he and his wife went on a cross-country lecture tour "in a pilgrimage for world peace." Their tour was bankrolled by the Falcon Lair Foundation, a nonprofit group interested in religion, philosophy and government whose headquarters were Falcon Lair, Beverly Hills, California (the former home of actor Rudolph Valentino).

After the war, LeFevre went to California and worked in the real estate business and unsuccessfully ran for Congress in the Republican primary of 1950. He then became radio and television broadcaster becoming involved in anti-leftist causes, including work for an anti-union organization named the Wage Earners Committee. A year later the committee was sued by two movie producers, Stanley Kramer and Dore Schary, for picketing and libeling their films as being pro-Soviet. LeFevre and Ruth Dazey were among the defendants, but the case died when the Wage Earners Committee disintegrated.

A few years later he became vice-president of Merwin K. Hart's National Economic Council; a director of the Congress of Freedom; a director of the U.S. (sometimes United States) Day Committee—whose purpose it was to diminish in importance the observation of October 23 as United Nations Day—and an adviser to Harry Everingham's "We, The People!". The U.S. Day Committee made headlines in 1954 when LeFevre led an attack on the Girl Scout Handbook as having too many references to the United Nations. The Scouts retreated, reporting that more than forty changes had been made—about half of which were due to LeFevre's protests.

That same year LeFevre relocated to Colorado Springs and started to write editorials for R. C. Hoiles' Gazette-Telegraph. Two years later he founded the Freedom School. What animated LeFevre personally and the Freedom School ideologically—indeed, forms the bedrock upon which all courses were based—is a complicated philosophy that, in essence, rejects all modern human government.

== Freedom School ==
In 1956, LeFevre founded the Freedom School, which he ran until 1973, in Larkspur, Colorado. In 1965, after a flood devastated the campus, the school and college moved to Santa Ana, California. The Freedom School was designed to educate people in LeFevre's philosophy about the meaning of freedom and free-market economic policy. LeFevre added Rampart College, an unaccredited four-year school, in 1963. Both institutions shared the same campus, and had a press, The Pine Tree Press, which published works for both, including a newsletter for the Freedom School, the Rampart Journal of Individualist Thought (1965–68), and a tabloid for the Press itself.

After Rampart College's closure in 1975, LeFevre carried on his work in South Carolina under the patronage of business giant Roger Milliken, and he also published Lefevre's Journal from 1974 to 1978. In 1979, LeFevre selected Freedom School graduate Kevin Cullinane to take over the teaching of Freedom School Seminars, including the Milliken Contract. Cullinane, who taught the principles of LeFevre's philosophy to students at Academy of the Rockies, which he had founded in 1972, taught Freedom School from 1979 until 2005 as part of Milliken's management training. He expanded its reach to include Sherman College, Wofford College, and individual seminars from coast to coast. Cullinane then left Freedom School behind in 2000, establishing his own school, Freedom Mountain Academy, in Tennessee, which ran until 2017, when it was shut down.

Notable teachers at the Freedom School or Rampart College include Rose Wilder Lane, Milton Friedman, F.A. Harper, Frank Chodorov, Leonard Read, Gordon Tullock, G. Warren Nutter, Bruno Leoni, James J. Martin, and Ludwig von Mises.

Notable graduates include Roy Childs, Kerry Thornley, and Roger MacBride.

== Rampart Institute ==
In the late 1970s, LeFevre became involved with the Rampart Institute in Santa Ana, California. Along with Lawrence Samuels and Richard Deyo, LeFevre was one of the driving forces to found the institution, presenting two speeches that were turned into booklets: "Good Government: Hope or Illusion?" and "Does Government Protection Protect?" Not long after receiving its non-profit, tax-deductible status, Rampart Institute was officially launched at The Future of Freedom Conference banquet on April 19, 1980, at Cypress College. From that event came the "Liberty Book Project," which sought to edit and publish LeFevre's 52-week audio home study-course called "The Fundamentals of Liberty". The hardback book was published posthumously in 1988, two years after LeFevre's death.

== Views ==
LeFevre believed that natural law is above the law of the state and that for American society to prosper economically, free-market reforms were essential. He also believed that attributing the good deeds of society to its government was no different from rewarding criminals for abstaining from illegal activity. All government consists of customs and institutions that control our lives by stealing our property, restricting our freedom, and endangering our lives with the rationale of protecting us from ourselves.

To this end, he adopted the term Autarchism to represent the idea of ruling over your own life, being responsible for yourself, your needs, and the consequences of your choices and actions. In a speech in 1977 and published the next year in the book Good Government: Hope or Illusion?, he said:

Many times when I use the term 'government', people think that I mean law and order. And so, if they hear me say: 'We don't need government', they think I mean we don't need law and order. Well, this is probably what makes me an 'autarchist' rather than an anarchist. I think we need law and order. You see, I am dedicated to the idea of lawful and orderly procedures. And because of that I have to stand against government. Because government doesn't provide either law or order.

=== Pacifism ===
LeFevre was also famously a pacifist, and taught his brand of libertarianism during the 1960s at the Freedom School, later Rampart College. Given his dedication to pacifism, LeFevre also spoke out against war as a product of the state. He once gave a speech called "Prelude to Hell" to a local Lions Club about what it would be like for a typical American city to get nuked as a result of "those mighty, terrible, pointless conflicts that the modern state inevitably creates." According to Doherty, LeFevre was "capable of facing down angry lieutenant colonels, who raged at his pacifistic refusal to fight for the flag, and explaining his theory of human rights so patiently, so guilelessly, that in the end the crusty colonel had to admit that LeFevre was right to stand his ground." According to Robert Smith, LeFevre became convinced of the power of non-violent resistance after a run-in with a union. "I remember him telling the story," says Smith, "of union goons busting into a radio station he worked at. And he just fell flat on the ground and lay there. They were so nonplussed they walked out without beating the shit out of him. That convinced him of the principles of nonviolence."

== Southern Strategy ==
After seeing the project of "tuition grants" for segregation academies launched by Southern segregationists in response to the integration of public schools by the federal government, LeFevre stated that he hoped the reaction to federal involvement in desegregation would cause "an aroused and embittered South" to join forces with anti-New Deal Northerners in opposing federal power.

== In popular culture ==
- Some such as Brian Doherty claim that LeFevre's movement was a basis for Robert A. Heinlein's book The Moon Is a Harsh Mistress and that LeFevre was the basis for the character Professor Bernardo de la Paz, organizer of the Lunar revolution.
- In the alternate history novel The Probability Broach by L. Neil Smith as part of the North American Confederacy Series in which the United States becomes a libertarian state in 1794 after a successful Whiskey Rebellion and the overthrowing and execution of George Washington by firing squad for treason, LeFevre served as the 23rd President of the North American Confederacy from 1960 to 1968.

== Bibliography ==
- Anarchy (1959)
- The Nature of Man and His Government (Caxton Printing, 1959) ISBN 0870040863
- This Bread is Mine (American Liberty Press, 1960)
- Constitutional Government in the Soviet Union (Exposition Press, 1962; Pine Tree Press, 1966)
- Limited Government – Hope or Illusion? (Pine Tree Press, 1963)
- Role of Private Property in a Free Society (Pine Tree Press, 1963)
- Anarchy v. Autoarchy (Pine Tree Press, 1965)
- Money (Pine Tree Press, 1965)
- The Philosophy of Ownership (Pine Tree Press, 1966, 1985; Ludwig von Mises Institute, 2007)
- Justice (Rampart College, 1972)
- Lift Her Up Tenderly (Pine Tree Press, 1976)
- Does Government Protection Protect? (Society for Libertarian Life ed, Rampart Press, 1978)
- Good Government: Hope or Illusion?(Society for Libertarian Life ed, Rampart Press, 1978)
- The Libertarian (Bramble Minibooks, 1978?)
- Protection (Rampart College, n.d.)
- The Fundamentals of Liberty (Rampart Institute, 1988) (posthumously) ISBN 0962048003
- A Way to Be Free (Pulpless, 1999) (posthumously) (autobiography) Vol. 1 ISBN 1584451416, Vol. 2 ISBN 1584451440
