= Autarchism =

Political ideology

Autarchism is a political ideology that promotes the principles of individualism, self-rule and private property. It rejects political government as an institution, supports private property absolutism and laissez-faire private capitalism.

== Autarchy Versus Anarchy ==
In Autarchy Versus Anarchy Robert LeFevre discussed why he rejects being an anarchist, while also opposing political institution of government. In LeFevre's view anarchists, even the most individualist ones like Benjamin Tucker, who "take a position similar to... [his] in respect to the evils of state controls imposed upon the creativity and productivity of the individual", defeat themselves by rejecting laissez-faire market capitalism and absolute property rights. He also noted that the word anarchy derives from Ancient Greek, being negation of -archy meaning rule or ruling, and means without rule, and given his belief that everyone is ruled by someone or something, it makes him consider anarchy in the literal sense both an impossible and undesirable ideal.

At the end of the text LeFevre conveys his opinion that "autarchy is contrary in major respects to anarchy", "anarchy is a branch of socialism, whereas autarchy is not" and said he loathed anarchist views on "morality, wealth, money, profits, rents, interest, land ownership, or a voluntary organization as inimical to freedom".

== Overview ==
Robert LeFevre, recognized as a pacifist individualist anarchist and an anarcho-capitalist by Murray Rothbard, distinguished autarchism from anarchism, mainly because it's economics contradicted his belief in laissez-faire private capitalism, and property absolutism. He situated the fundamental premise of autarchy within the philosophers such as Marcus Aurelius and Epicurus, which he summarized in the credo "Control yourself".

The main disagreement between LeFevre's autarchism and Murray Rothbard's anarcho-capitalism was in former's condemnation of aggression against person or their property, no matter the circumstances, be it in self-defense against an aggressor, retaliation, or even stealing-back stolen property from the thief. Rothbard also noted that "In his anxiety to attack all defensive violence... LeFevre goes so far as to make common cause with the statists in denying the workability of anarcho-capitalism, with its belief in private, competing defense agencies on the free market."

Another disagreement between LeFevre and Murray Rothbard was about political action, with the former rejecting political action, including voting and political parties, and Rothbard criticizing him for it.

LeFevre rejected retributive justice, and the existence of police, believing it to be based upon it. Instead he argued that people should secure property by preventive means and insurance, and personally believed most people would respect property so their rights would be respected in exchange. To LeFevre human rights of self-ownership and right to property are equal, universal and inalienable. If it's wrong to murder or steal, it's wrong in all conditions.

If it is wrong for a thief to steal, it is wrong for his victim to steal from him in return. The act of theft is either wrong in principle or it is wrong only under certain conditions. Stolen property, like all property acquired by government, is merely property which is, at the moment, incorrectly owned.

According to LeFevre collective property is problematic, because no private point of view or interest can be maintained, and decisions are done by group of people different from the ones who are said to own it and who are going to pay for repair and maintenance. Joint ownership is different, because co-owners may resell their shares, but for it to be recognized as correct ownership the responsibility and authority must be placed upon one person, the question of who will act as the sovereign must be agreed before the partnership agreement is entered. While there may be change in leadership, for proper ownership there must always be a person with ultimate authority.

Finding himself in agreement with Lysander Spooner on questions of private property, anti statism and belief in natural law, LeFevre called Spooner the father of modern autarchy, but recognized that Spooner had anti-capitalist, economic egalitarian, socialist and revolutionary ideas and tendencies, which are incompatible with LeFevre's conception of autarchy.

Fusing these influences, LeFevre arrived at the autarchist ideology: "The Stoics provide the moral framework; the Epicureans, the motivation; the praxeologists, the methodology. I propose to call this package of ideological systems autarchy, because autarchy means self-rule". LeFevre stated that "the bridge between Spooner and modern-day autarchists was constructed primarily by persons such as H. L. Mencken, Albert Jay Nock, and Mark Twain".

LeFevre opposed existence of legislature and saw limited government to be an impossibility.

When you grant to some men the power to pass laws, to amend those laws, to interpret those laws, and to enforce those laws, you cannot at the same time pass to other men a contrary power which will hold the first men in check. Those who have power, have it; those who do not have it, do not have it. Unlimited government is a redundancy; limited government, an illusion.

Our problem, as I see it, is to recognize the enormous virtue of self-government and to learn to be honest enough that we will not confuse self-government with any system whatever which deprives us of self-government.

The man who is able to govern himself is the free man. The man who is governed by others is the slave.

I have decided in favor of freedom and self-government for myself.

== See also ==
- Anarchism
- Anarchy
- Anarcho-capitalism
- Egoist anarchism
- Individualist anarchism
- Lysander Spooner
- Market anarchism
- Right-libertarianism
- Rugged individualism
- Self-governance
- Self-ownership
- Voluntaryism
