= Leica CL (Typ 7323) =

Digital camera model released in 2017

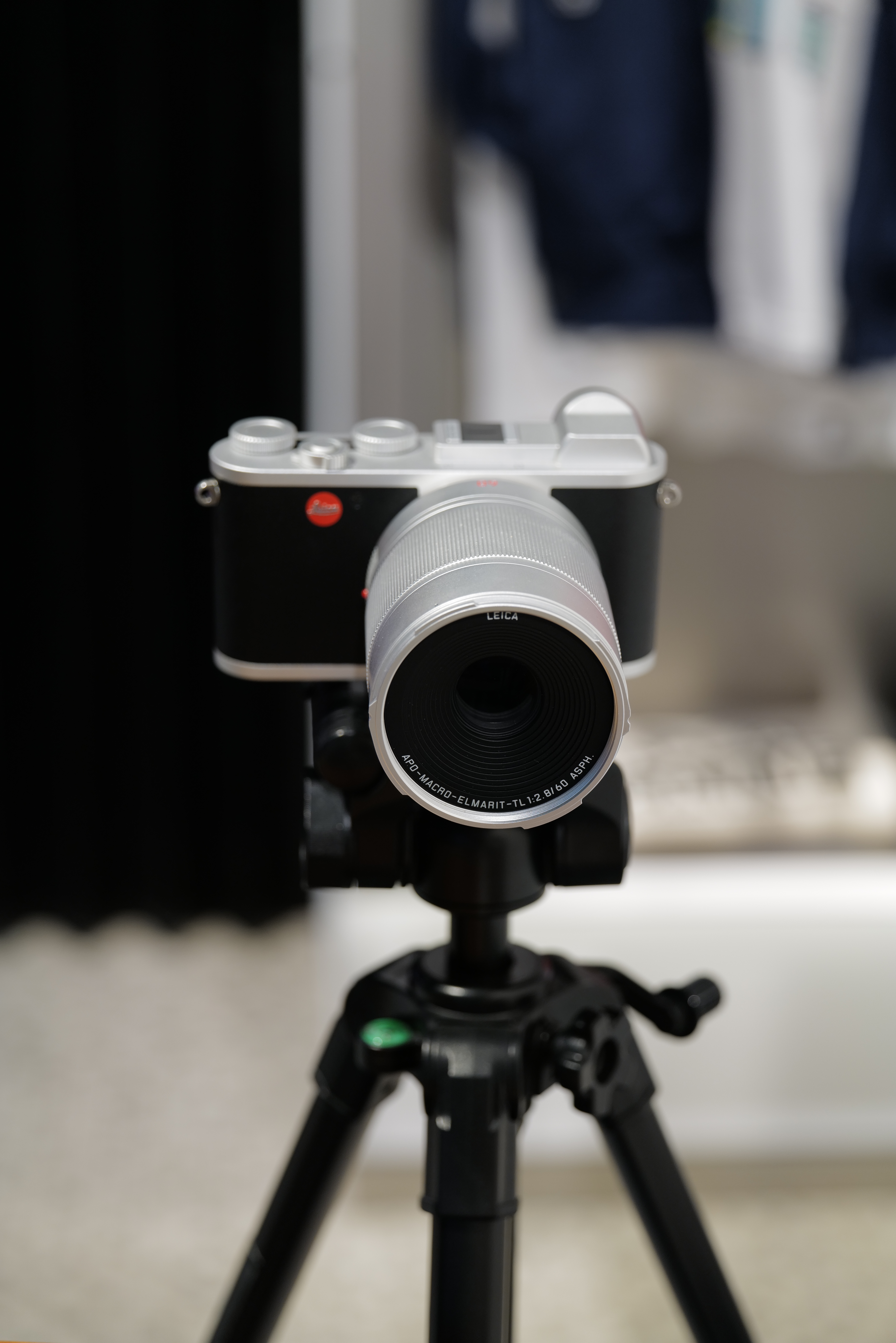
- Leica CL

Overview
- Maker: Leica Camera AG
- Released: November 2017

Lens
- Lens mount: Leica L mount

Sensor/medium
- Sensor type: 23.6 x 15.7mm CMOS
- Sensor size: APS-C
- Maximum resolution: 6,000 × 4,000 (24 megapixels)

Focusing
- Focus: Contrast AF system

Flash
- Flash: no internal flash, flash out shoe for optional flash systems

Viewfinder
- Viewfinder: LCOS, 2.4 million dots
- Frame coverage: 100%

Image processing
- Image processor: Maestro II
- White balance: Yes

General
- Data port(s): 802.11b/g/n 2,4GHz X-Sync contact HDMI Type A Multi Port for Remote Control and Audio Adapter Cable
- Body features: Dust- and spraywater proof
- Made in: Germany

The Leica CL is an APS-C mirrorless system camera announced by Leica Camera AG in November, 2017.

The CL is a member of Leica's L-mount family of cameras, which began with the discontinued T/TL, and is currently shared with the TL2 and SL cameras. It shares the same sensor as the TL2, and is primarily differentiated from its sister model by its user interface, which focuses on physical controls as opposed to touchscreen, and presence of an integrated viewfinder.

== See also ==
- List of retro-style digital cameras
