= Libertarian Review =

American libertarian magazine

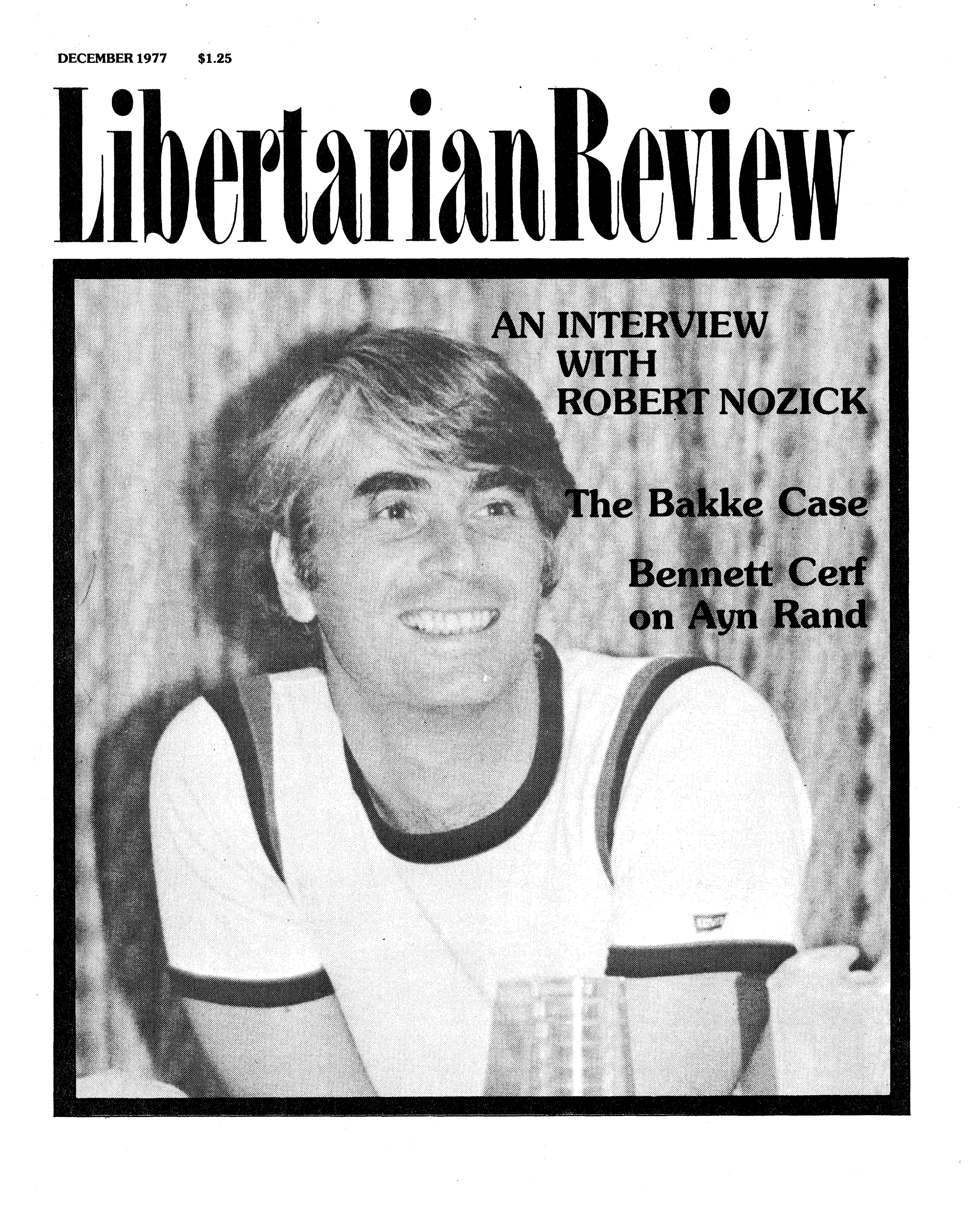
- Cover of the December 1977 issue, featuring Robert Nozick
- Editors: Karl T. Pflock ?–Mar/Apr 1977; Roy A. Childs, Jr. Jul 1977–Nov/Dec 1981
- Executive editors: Walter K. Olson; Jeff Riggenbach; Marshall E. Schwartz
- Senior editors: Jeff Riggenbach; Murray N. Rothbard; Joan Kennedy Taylor
- Associate editors: Bruce R. Bartlett; Roy A. Childs, Jr.; Walter E. Grinder; Charles H. Hamilton; John Hospers; Leonard P. Liggio; Tibor Machan; Milton Mueller; Joseph R. Peden; Ralph Raico; Murray N. Rothbard; Joan Kennedy Taylor
- Contributing editors: Doug Bandow; Bruce Bartlett; Bill Birmingham; Peter R. Breggin, M.D.; David Brudnoy; Milton Mueller; Leslee J. Newman; Tom G. Palmer; Sheldon Richman; Jeff Riggenbach; Murray N. Rothbard; Marshall E. Schwartz; Jack Shafer
- Staff writers: Bill Birmingham
- Categories: Politics
- Frequency: Monthly
- Publisher: Robert D. Kephart; Charles H. Hamilton; Ed Crane; Chris Hocker
- Founder: Robert D. Kephart
- Founded: 1972
- Final issue Number: November/December 1981; Vol. 10, Nos. 11–12 (Double Issue)
- Company: Libertarian Review, Inc.
- Country: United States
- Based in: Washington, D. C. ?–Dec 1975; Alexandria, VA Jan/Feb 1976–Mar/Apr 1977; New York, N. Y. Jul–Dec 1977; San Francisco, CA Jan/Feb 1978–Jan 1981; Washington, D. C. Feb 1981–Nov/Dec 1981
- Language: English
- ISSN: 0364-0302

Libertarian Review was an American libertarian magazine published until 1981. It had been established by Robert Kephart in 1972 as a book-review magazine, initially titled SIL Book Review (2 issues), then Books for Libertarians, and was renamed with the March, 1974 issue. In 1977, Charles Koch purchased the magazine and turned it into a national magazine under the editorship of Roy A. Childs, Jr.

At the time, there were two other slick-paper libertarian magazines, Reason, which at the time leaned towards the right wing of the libertarian spectrum, and Inquiry, which tilted left. Libertarian Review was more movement-oriented than either magazine. It also differed from both in its strong opposition to nuclear energy.

In the summer of 1981, the Koch Foundation, which was funding Inquiry as well as Libertarian Review, decided that it could not continue to support two magazines and folded Libertarian Review into Inquiry starting with the January 1982 issue. The last issue was November/December 1981. However, Cato then transferred Inquiry to the Libertarian Review Foundation with the February 1982 issue.
