= Leica L-Mount =

Camera lens mount

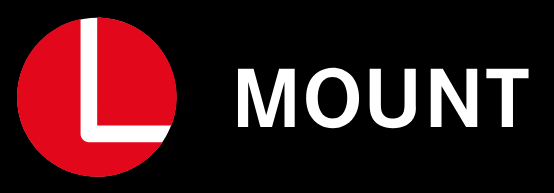
- Logo of the L-mount alliance
- Type: Bayonet, digital interface
- Inner diameter: 51.6 mm
- Tabs: 4
- Flange: 20 mm
- Connectors: 10 electrical pins

The Leica L-Mount is a bayonet mount developed by Leica Camera AG for interchangeable-lens autofocus digital cameras.

The L-Mount has an inner diameter of 51.6 mm and a flange depth of 20.0 mm. The L-mount exists in two versions, an APS-C version (TL) and a full-frame version (SL). The two versions are mechanically and electronically compatible. TL lenses mounted on full-frame cameras will cause the camera to use a crop mode from the center of the sensor, corresponding to the APS-C coverage of the lens. SL lenses mounted on TL cameras function normally, providing a 1.5x crop field of view, as is typical with APS-C cameras.

In 2018 Leica formed the L-Mount Alliance, licensing Sigma, Panasonic in the same year, to use an upgraded version of the mount for their own products, opening the way for a more extensive system of fully compatible cameras and lenses.

Ernst Leitz Wetzlar GmbH, the cine lens business of Leica, joined the L-Mount Alliance in 2021, DJI followed in 2022, Samyang, Astrodesign, Blackmagic Design in 2023, Sirui, Viltrox in 2025 and Freefly Systems in 2026.

== T-Mount to L-Mount ==
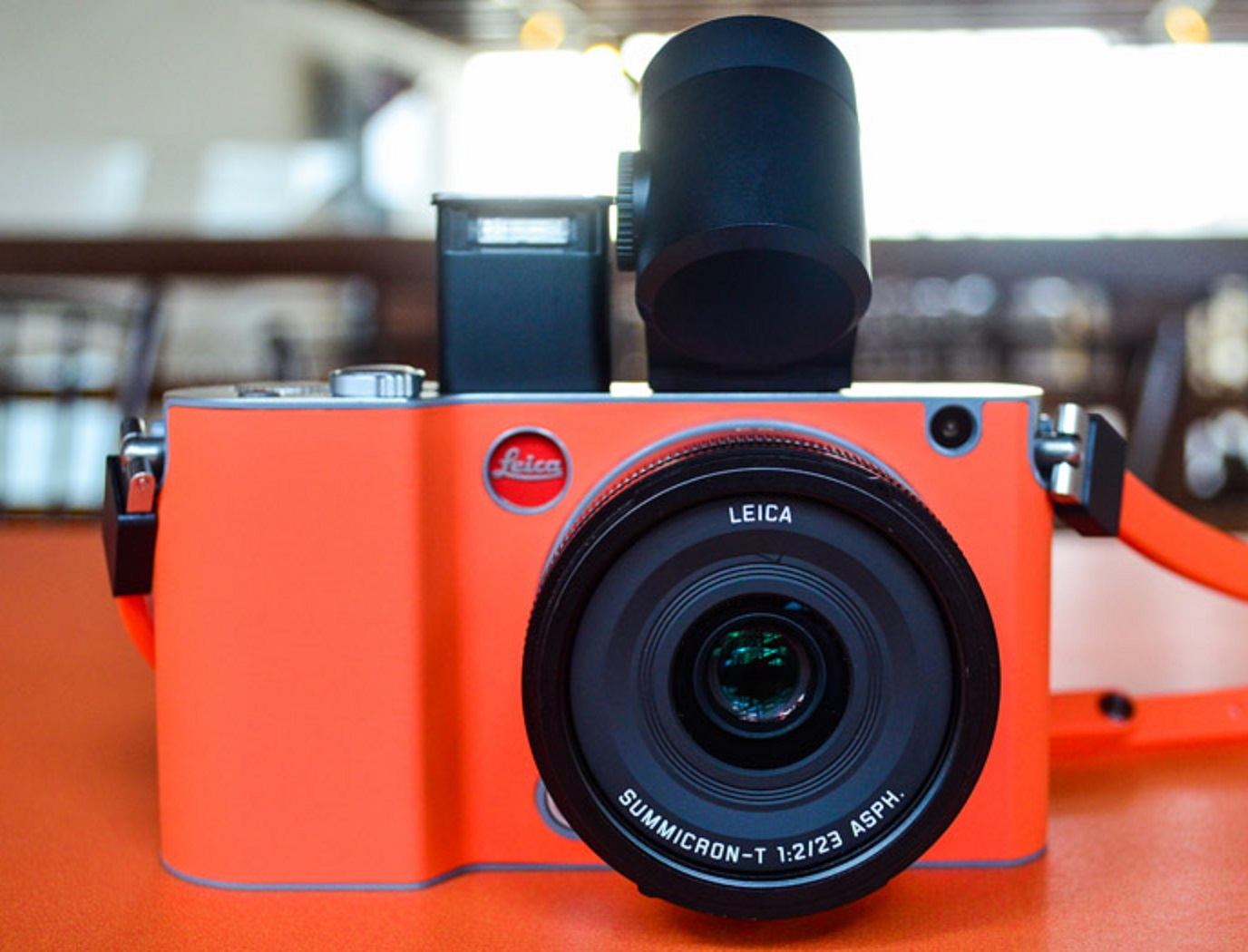
Leica T (701), the first L-Mount camera

It was introduced in April 2014 with the Leica T (Typ 701) camera. At the time of introduction, it was called the "T-mount", but this was changed to "L-mount" with the release of the Leica SL, a full-frame sensor camera using the same mount. The Leica T was renamed to the Leica TL at this time, to permit marketing clarity for the L-mount lens line: TL lenses would cover APS-C sensors, while SL lenses would cover full-frame sensors.

The mount is used by the Leica TL (discontinued), TL2, Leica CL (2017) and Leica SL systems. The L-Mount is a registered trademark of Leica Camera AG.

== L-Mount Alliance ==
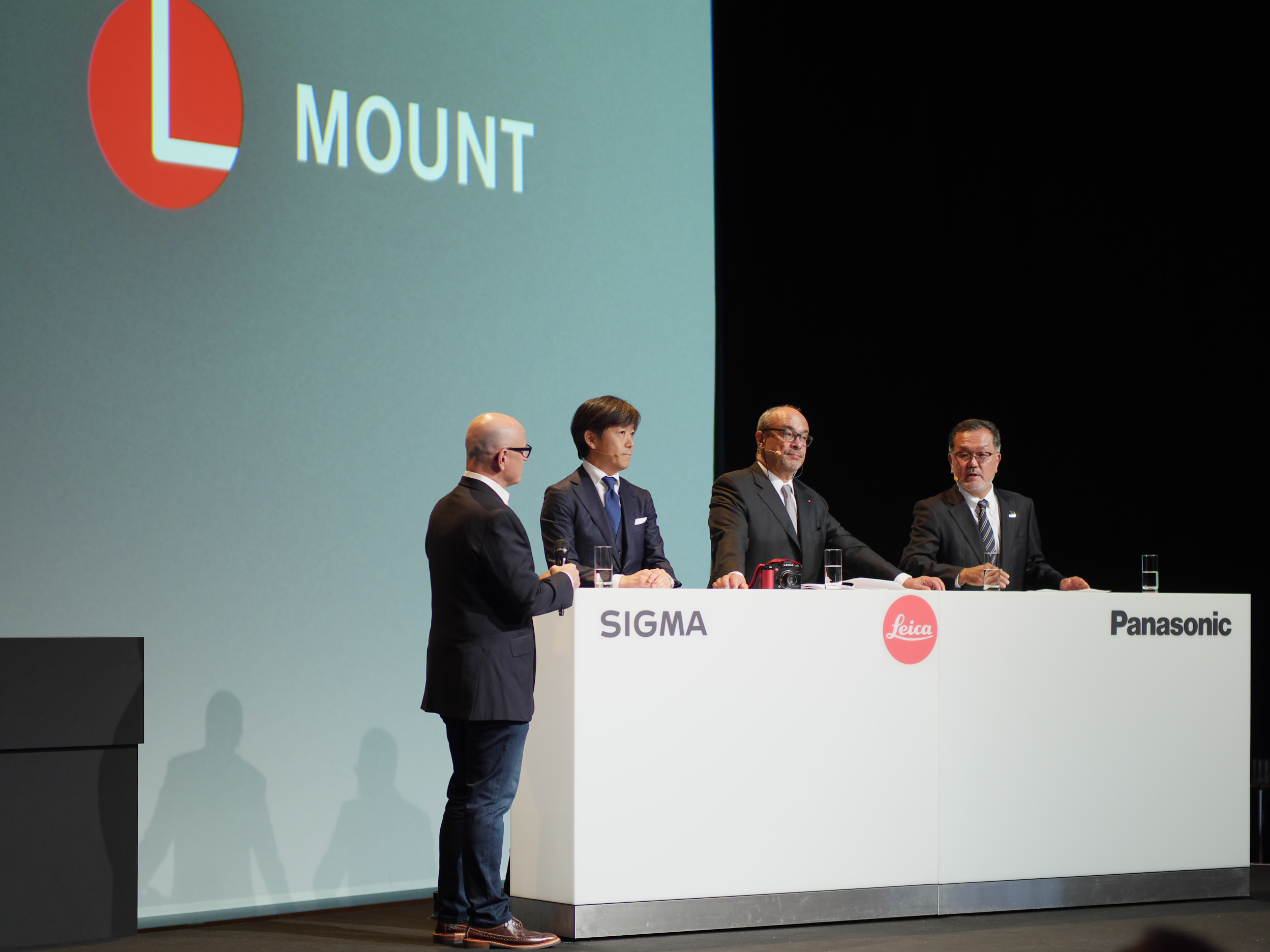
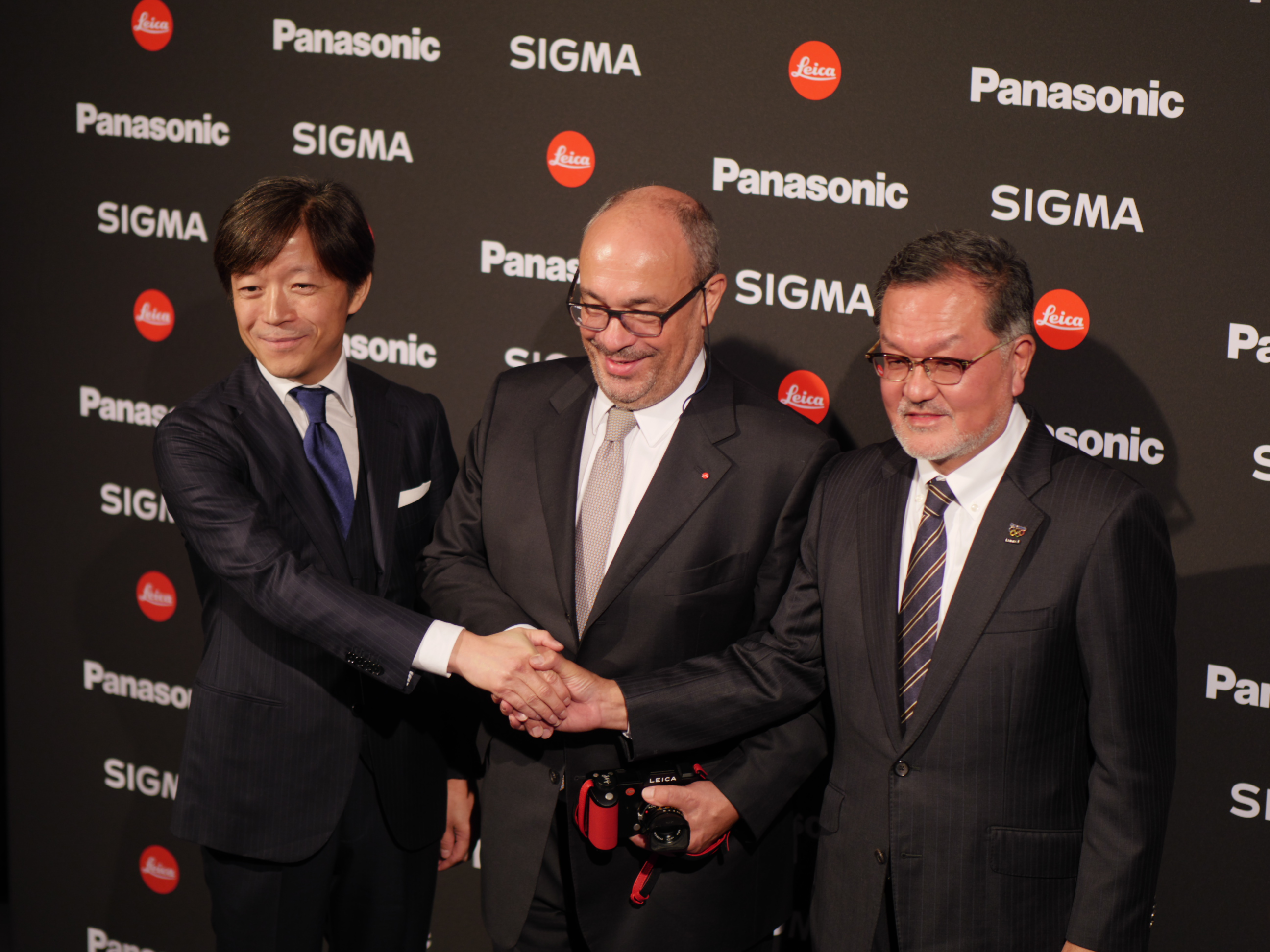
Kazuto Yamaki (Sigma), Andreas Kaufmann (Leica Camera) and Junichiro Kitagawa (Panasonic) during the announcement of the alliance on 25 September 2018 at photokina in Cologne

On 25 September 2018, Leica Camera AG, Panasonic and the Sigma Corporation launched together The L-Mount Alliance. This allowed Panasonic and Sigma to make use of the L-Mount standard initially developed by Leica, to offer cameras and lenses utilizing this lens mount with improved firmware and full compatibility among products of the alliance. On the same day, both Sigma and Panasonic announced new products compatible with the L-mount.

Sigma announced a full-frame L-mount camera using the company's unique Foveon X3 sensor technology. Sigma will initially release the same L-mount variants of existing lenses as they are producing for the.

Sigma announced that it would launch a full-frame camera in 2019, using the L-Mount and the company's Foveon X3 sensor. The also announced a range of L-mount variants of their existing Sony E-mount lenses, and lens adapters for existing Sigma SA-mount and Canon EF mount lenses. According to Sigma CEO, Kazuto Yamaki, the improved "L-mount system is not exactly the same as the existing one. We updated it a little bit to work better with such lenses through lens adapters."

Panasonic announced its S1R and S1 full-frame L-Mount cameras and three L-Mount lenses, with seven more lenses to be launched by 2020.

Six cameras and 39 native lenses have been announced for the L-Mount by 2020.

=== Expansion ===
The next company to join the alliance was German cinema lens maker Ernst Leitz Wetzlar GmbH in 2021, later renamed Leitz Cine. It since has been followed by a number of other camera and lens manufacturers.

L-Mount Alliance members and their products
№	Member	Since	Mainstream cameras	Lenses	Specialized/cinema cameras and gimbals	Drones
1	Leica	25 September 2018	Yes	Yes		
2	Panasonic	25 September 2018	Yes	Yes		
3	Sigma	25 September 2018	Yes	Yes		
4	Leitz Cine	14 October 2021		Yes		
5	DJI	15 June 2022			Yes	Yes
6	Astrodesign	14 July 2023			Yes	
7	Samyang	14 July 2023		Yes		
8	Blackmagic Design	15 September 2023			Yes	
9	Sirui	20 March 2025		Yes		
10	Viltrox	1 September 2025		Yes		
11	Freefly Systems	17 April 2026			Yes	Yes

Despite not being alliance members, some other brands, such as 7Artisans, TTartisan, AstrHori and Meike, have also introduced their autofocusing lenses for L-mount.

== Cameras ==
=== APS-C ===
Leica T/TL cameras use APS-C sensors. The TL mount version is not dust- or splashproof. Discontinued models:

- Leica T (Typ 701)
- Leica TL
- Leica TL2
- Leica CL (2017)

=== Full-frame ===
Leica SL cameras use full frame sensors. The SL version is dust- and splashproof.

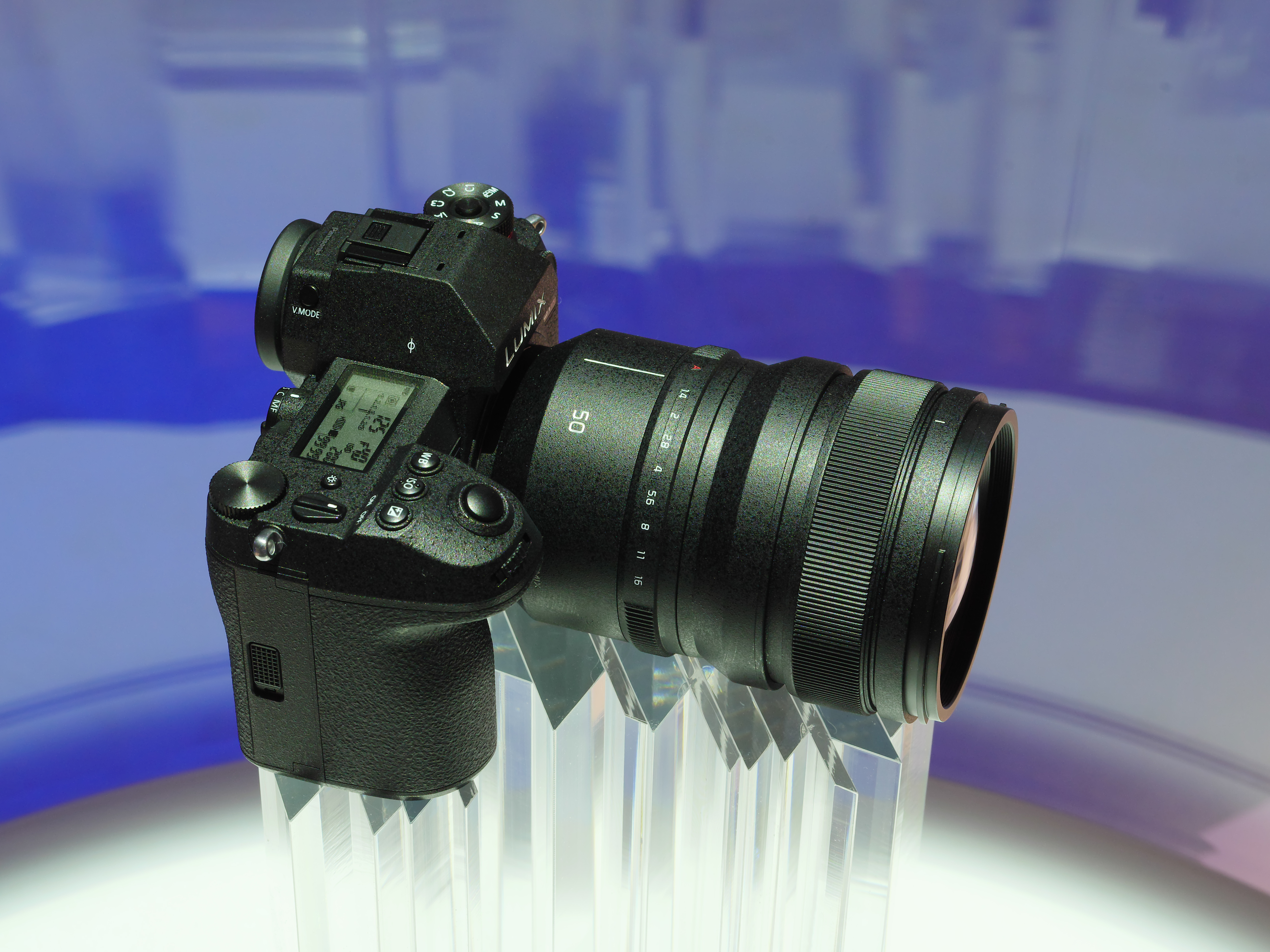
Panasonic Lumix S1R with prime lens 50 mm f/1.4 at photokina in September 2018

- Blackmagic Cinema Camera 6K
- Blackmagic PYXIS 6K
- DJI Ronin 4D
- Leica SL (Typ 601)
- Leica SL2
- Leica SL2-S
- Leica SL3
- Leica SL3S
- Panasonic S1R
- Panasonic Lumix S1
- Panasonic Lumix S1H
- Panasonic LUMIX BS1H
- Panasonic Lumix S5
- Panasonic Lumix S5II/S5IIX
- Panasonic Lumix S9
- Panasonic Lumix SHX1
- Sigma fp
- Sigma fp L
- Sigma BF

The Unspecified Foveon-based full-frame camera Sigma initially announced at the original event has been withdrawn.

== Lenses ==
Leica has an existing range of 21 L-Mount lenses.

Panasonic committed to releasing a total of ten lenses for the L-mount by the end of 2020, beginning with the 50mm F/1.4 prime and the two zooms listed below; stating that they would provide details at Photokina 2019.

Sigma plans to release a wide range of lenses. 14 primes from Sigma's 'Global Vision' range, primarily designed for reflex cameras with short flange depths and currently available for the mirrorless Sony E-mount, will also be released in L-Mount from 2019. These will be followed by a range designed specifically for mirrorless parameters.

=== APS-C ===
==== Prime ====
- Leica APO-Macro-Elmarit-TL 1:2.8 / 60 ASPH
- Leica Summilux-TL 1:1.4 / 35 ASPH
- Leica Summicron-TL 1:2 / 23 ASPH
- Leica Elmarit-TL 1:2.8 / 18 ASPH
- Sigma 16mm f/1.4 DC DN Contemporary
- Sigma 30mm f/1.4 DC DN Contemporary
- Sigma 56mm f/1.4 DC DN Contemporary

==== Zoom ====
- Leica Super-Vario-Elmar-TL 1:3.5-4.5 / 11-23 ASPH
- Leica Vario-Elmar-TL 1:3.5-5.6 / 18-56 ASPH
- Leica APO-Vario-Elmar-TL 1:3.5-4.5 / 55-135 ASPH
- Sigma 18-50 f/2.8 DC DN Contemporary
- Sigma 10-18 f/2.8 DC DN Contemporary

=== Full-frame ===
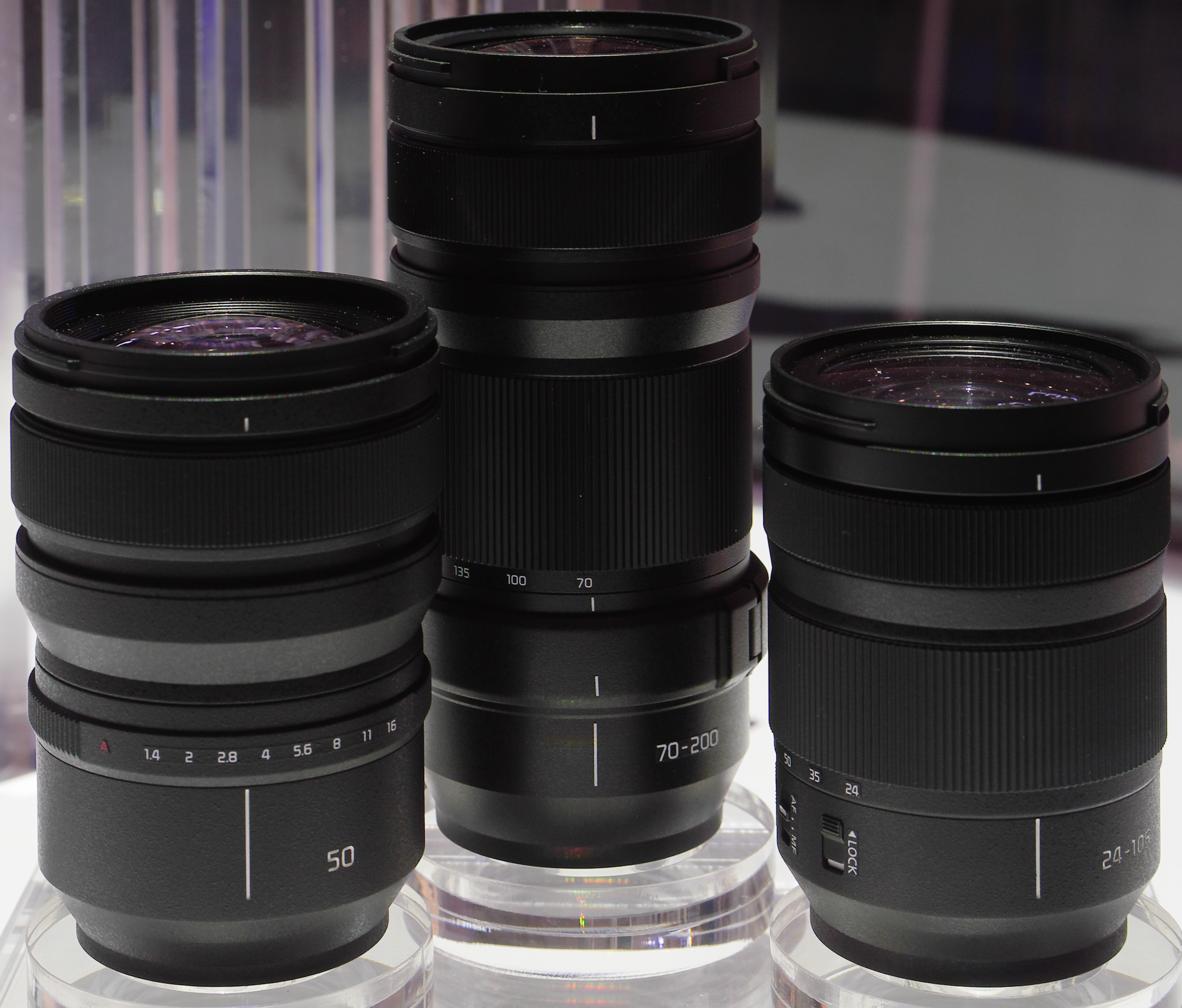
Panasonic Lumix S full-frame L-mount lenses: 50 mm f/1,4, 70-200 mm and 24-105 mm

==== Prime ====
- Leica Summilux-SL 1:1.4 / 50 ASPH
- Leica APO-Summicron-SL 1:2 / 75 ASPH
- Leica APO-Summicron-SL 1:2 / 90 ASPH
- Leica APO-Summicron-SL 1:2 / 35 ASPH
- Leica APO-Summicron-SL 1:2 / 50 ASPH
- Leica APO-Summicron-SL 1:2 / 28 ASPH
- Panasonic Lumix S 18mm f/1.8
- Panasonic Lumix S 24mm f/1.8
- Panasonic Lumix S 35mm f/1.8
- Panasonic Lumix S PRO 50mm f/1.4
- Panasonic Lumix S 50mm f/1.8
- Panasonic Lumix S 85mm f/1.8
- Panasonic Lumix S 100mm f/2.8 Macro
- Sigma 17mm f/4 DG DN Contemporary
- Sigma 20mm f/2 DG DN Contemporary
- Sigma 24mm f/2 DG DN Contemporary
- Sigma 24mm f/3.5 DG DN Contemporary
- Sigma 35mm f/2 DG DN Contemporary
- Sigma 45mm f/2.8 DG DN Contemporary
- Sigma 50mm f/2 DG DN Contemporary
- Sigma 65mm f/2 DG DN Contemporary
- Sigma 90mm f/2.8 DG DN Contemporary
- Sigma 14mm f/1.4 DG DN Art
- Sigma 20mm f/1.4 DG DN Art
- Sigma 24mm f/1.4 DG DN Art
- Sigma 35mm f/1.2 DG DN Art
- Sigma 35mm f/1.4 DG DN Art
- Sigma 50mm f/1.4 DG DN Art
- Sigma 85mm f/1.4 DG DN Art
- Sigma 105mm f/2.8 DG DN MACRO Art
- Sigma 14mm f/1.8 DG HSM Art
- Sigma 20mm f/1.4 DG HSM Art
- Sigma 24mm f/1.4 DG HSM Art
- Sigma 28mm f/1.4 DG HSM Art
- Sigma 35mm f/1.4 DG HSM Art
- Sigma 40mm f/1.4 DG HSM Art
- Sigma 50mm f/1.4 DG HSM Art
- Sigma 70mm f/2.8 DG MACRO Art
- Sigma 85mm f/1.4 DG HSM Art
- Sigma 105mm f/1.4 DG HSM Art
- Sigma 135mm f/1.8 DG HSM Art
- Sigma 500mm f/5.6 DG DN OS Sports
- Viltrox AF 16mm F1.8 L

==== Zoom ====
- Leica Super-Vario-Elmarit-SL 14-24mm f/2.8 ASPH
- Leica Super-Vario-Elmar-SL 1:3.5-4.5 / 16-35 ASPH
- Leica Vario-Elmarit-SL 24–70 mm 2,8 ASPH
- Leica Vario-Elmarit-SL 1:2.8-4 / 24-90 ASPH
- Leica Vario-Elmarit-SL 28-70mm f/2.8
- Leica Vario-Elmarit-SL 70-200mm f/2.8 ASPH
- Leica APO-Vario-Elmarit-SL 1:2.8-4 / 90-280
- Leica Vario-Elmar-SL 100-400mm f/5-6.3
- Panasonic LUMIX S PRO 16-35mm f/4
- Panasonic LUMIX S 20-60mm f/3.5-5.6
- Panasonic LUMIX S PRO 24-70mm f/2.8
- Panasonic LUMIX S 24-105mm f/4 MACRO O.I.S.
- Panasonic LUMIX S 28-200mm 4-7.1 Macro O.I.S.
- Panasonic LUMIX S PRO 70-200mm f/4 O.I.S.
- Panasonic LUMIX S PRO 70-200mm f/2.8 O.I.S.
- Panasonic LUMIX S 70–300 mm 4.5-5.6 Macro OIS
- Panasonic Lumix S 14-28mm F4-5.6 Macro
- Sigma 14-24mm f/2.8 DG DN Art
- Sigma 16-28mm f/2.8 DG DN Contemporary
- Sigma 24-70mm f/2.8 DG DN Art
- Sigma 28-70mm f/2.8 DG DN Contemporary
- Sigma 70-200mm f/2.8 DG DN Sports
- Sigma 100-400mm f/5-6.3 DG DN OS Contemporary
- Sigma 150-600mm f/5-6.3 DG DN OS Sports
- Sigma 60-600mm f/4.5-6.3 DG DN OS Sports
- LK Samyang AF 35-150mm F2-2.8 L
- LK Samyang AF 14-24mm F2.8

=== Third-party ===
Manual third-party lenses are being produced in L-mount by Irix, 7Artisans (Photoelectric series), Meyer-Optik (Görlitz series), and Kipon HandeVision (IBELUX and IBERIT series).

==== Full Frame ====
- 7Artisans MF 9mm f/5.6 APSH
- 7Artisans MF 10mm f/2.8 Fisheye
- 7Artisans MF 10mm f/2.8 Mark II
- 7Artisans AF 10mm F2.5
- 7Artisans MF 14mm f/2.8
- 7Artisans MF 18mm f/5.6
- 7Artisans MF 35mm f/5.6
- 7Artisans MF 35mm f/1.4 Ⅲ
- 7Artisans MF 35mm T1.5 Dream
- 7Artisans MF 50mm T1.5 Dream
- 7Artisans MF 75mm T1.5 Dream
- 7Artisans MF 75mm f/1.4
- 7Artisans AF 40mm F2.5
- DZOfilm Catta Zoom 18-35 mm T2.9-T22
- DZOfilm 35-80 mm T2.9-T22
- DZOfilm 70-135 mm T2.9-T22
- TTArtisan 14mm F2.8 ASPH
- TTArtisan Tilt-Shift 17mm F4 ASPH
- TTArtisan 100mm F2.8 Macro 2X
- TTArtisan 500mm F6.3 Telephoto Lens
- TTArtisan 11mm F2.8 Fisheye Lens
- TTArtisan Tilt 50mm F1.4
- TTArtisan 50mm F2
- TTArtisan 50mm F1.4 ASPH. Full Frame
- Meyer Optik Görlitz Primoplan 58 f1.9 II
- Meyer Optik Görlitz Trioplan 35 f2.8 II
- Meyer Optik Görlitz Lydith 30 f3.5 II
- Meyer Optik Görlitz Trioplan 50 f2.8 II
- Meyer Optik Görlitz Biotar 75 f1.5 II
- Meyer Optik Görlitz Biotar 58 f1.5 II
- Meyer Optik Görlitz Primoplan 75 f1.9 II
- Meyer Optik Görlitz Trioplan 100 f2.8 II
- Irix 11mm T4.3 Cine lens
- Irix 15mm T2.6 Cine lens
- Irix 21mm T1.5 Cine lens
- Irix 30mm T1.5 Cine lens
- Irix 45mm T1.5 Cine lens
- Irix 65mm T1.5 Cine lens
- Irix 150mm T3.0 Tele Cine lens
- Irix 150mm T3.0 macro 1:1 Cine lens

==== APS-C ====
- TTArtisan APS-C 25mm F2
- TTArtisan APS-C 50mm F0.95
- TTArtisan APS-C 23mm F1.4
- TTArtisan APS-C 40mm F2.8 MACRO
- TTArtisan APS-C 17mm F1.4
- TTArtisan APS-C 50mm F1.2
- TTArtisan APS-C 7.5mm F2 Fisheye
- TTArtisan APS-C 35mm F1.4

== Lens adapters ==
- Leica R-Adapter L
- Leica S-Adapter L
- Leica M-Adapter L
- Leica PL-Adapter L
- Novoflex SL-EOS Adapter
- Novoflex SL/NIK Adapter
- Sigma MC-21 SA-L
- Sigma MC-21 EF-L Sigma-manufactured 'Global Vision' EF-mount lenses are fully supported and compatible; although non-Sigma EF-mount lenses remain unguaranteed.
