= Students for a Libertarian Society =

Former activist organization

Students for a Libertarian Society (SLS) was an activist organization for students in the United States seeking to promote libertarian ideals on college campuses. Currently active libertarian student groups include Students for Liberty and Young Americans for Liberty.

== Origins ==
The name and organizational structure were inspired by the success of Students for a Democratic Society in the 1960s. It was organizationally distinct from the Libertarian Party which had its own, much smaller, official youth wing, the Young Libertarian Alliance.

== National organization ==
At its height in 1979 and 1980, SLS had a central national office with a paid staff in San Francisco, and dozens of chapters. It also published a variety of pamphlets and issue papers and Liberty magazine in a newspaper format with a circulation of more than 10,000 copies per issue.

The National Directors of Students for a Libertarian Society were Milton Mueller (1979–1981), Jeffrey Friedman (1981–1982), Kathleen Jacob Richman (1982), and Chris Gunderson (1982–83). Others active in the organization were Williamson Evers, Chris Sciabarra, Mark Brady, Marc Joffe, Eric Garris, and David Beito, who were members of the national board, and Paul Jacob, a prominent draft registration resister, Tom G. Palmer, and Dave Nalle, the publications director and editor of Liberty magazine. Former chapter heads included Justin Raimondo, Lee Cronk, Greg Costikyan and Alan R. Weiss.

The SLS was very active in organizing protests against draft registration during the presidential administration of Jimmy Carter. It later organized protests against governmental support for nuclear power. As part of this effort, it worked closely with scientist John Gofman, a veteran of the Manhattan Project and a key developer of an early process for separating plutonium from fission products, in a campaign to repeal such subsidies for nuclear power as the Price Anderson Act. Gofman, sometimes described as the "father" of the modern anti-nuclear movement in the United States, was a self-described libertarian. Many members of SLS supported the Libertarian presidential campaign of Ed Clark in 1980 but, unlike the Young Libertarian Alliance and its successor Students for Clark, SLS did not officially take a stand.

== Decline ==
Beginning in 1982, the SLS began to fall apart as a national organization over disagreements between the Radical Caucus of Murray Rothbard, Williamson Evers and Justin Raimondo, and others associated with Ed Crane and the Cato Institute. In 1982, it had to make massive cutbacks when billionaire Charles Koch withdrew his financial support. It had angered its benefactor with the publication of a monograph that glorified San Francisco's White Night riots, titled In Praise of Outlaws: Rebuilding Gay Liberation. After the last National Director, Chris Gunderson, failed to get replacement funding, SLS quickly collapsed. It seems to have disappeared as a national organization in 1983 though a few chapters remained active for several years.

== Reestablishment ==
Justin Raimondo was involved in an attempt to reestablish a national organization under the aegis of antiwar.com and led by Mike Ewens of the Washington University chapter, but although some local chapters seem to have been founded not much else appears to have been done on a national basis and the website is offline. The banner of organizing libertarian students has since been picked up by new organizations: Students For Liberty and Young Americans for Liberty.
