= Joan Kennedy Taylor =

American journalist (1926–2005)

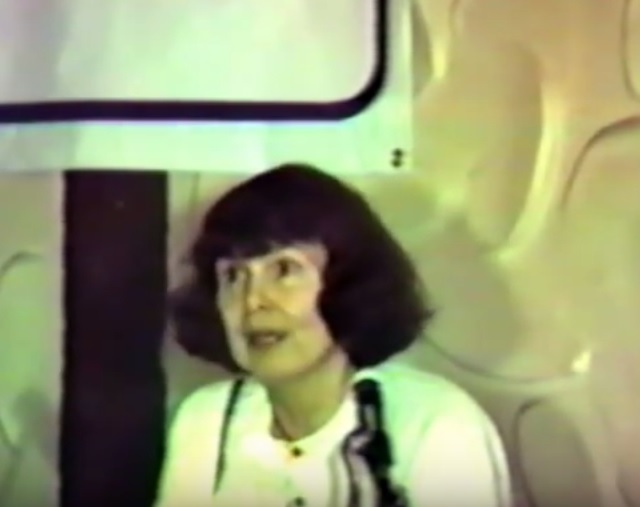
- Taylor speaking at a conference in 1981
- Born: December 21, 1926; New York City, U.S.
- Died: October 29, 2005 (aged 78); New York City, U.S.
- Occupations: Journalist, editor
- Relatives: Deems Taylor (father)

Joan Kennedy Taylor (December 21, 1926 – October 29, 2005) was an American journalist, author, editor, public intellectual, and political activist. She is best known for her advocacy of individualist feminism and for her role in the development of the modern American libertarian movement.

== Early life ==
Taylor was born in Manhattan to prominent parents. Her father was composer, radio personality, and musical journalist Deems Taylor. Her mother was actress, playwright, and poet Mary Kennedy. She grew up in New York, in suburban Connecticut, and, after her parents separated when she was six years old, around the world. Her father's biographer, James Pegolotti, writes that "[b]y 1942, owing to a peregrinating mother, Joan had attended eight schools, in such far-flung spots as Peking, Paris, and Ellsworth, Maine, as well as New York."

After graduating from St. Timothy's School, Taylor returned to New York to study playwrighting at Barnard College. There she met Donald A. Cook, a psychology undergraduate at nearby Columbia University. After their marriage in 1948, Taylor went to work as an actress on stage, radio, and television (with the usual assortment of accompanying dead-end day jobs). Much of her spare time she devoted to auditing graduate courses in psychology at Columbia, where Cook was now pursuing a Ph.D., and to dabbling in the ideas of G. I. Gurdjieff and P. D. Ouspensky.

In the early 1950s, the Cooks hosted a series of legendary parties at their ground-floor apartment on 112th Street, near the Barnard and Columbia campuses. Joyce Johnson, in her memoir Minor Characters, recalls the place as "like an apartment at the bottom of a well – midnight even on a sunny day. The door was never locked. You never knew whom you'd find there. Psychologists, Dixieland jazz musicians, poets, runaway girls, a madman named Carl Solomon whom an old Columbia classmate of [Donald's], Allen Ginsberg, had met in a psychiatric ward." Nor were Solomon and Allen Ginsberg the only Beat Generation luminaries to attend these gatherings. There were also William S. Burroughs, Lucien Carr, Gregory Corso, and Jack Kerouac.

== Career ==
In the mid-1950s, Taylor abandoned acting and went into publishing, taking a job at Alfred A. Knopf and Company. It was in 1957, James Pegolotti reports, when, "[a]s a publicity assistant at Knopf, Joan read an advance copy of [Ayn] Rand's Atlas Shrugged and found the book fascinating. She wrote a letter of appreciation to the author, who responded by inviting her to lunch. The two women established a friendship, partly because of Joan's deep interest in... 'Objectivism.' For Taylor, Rand blended literary aptitude and economic philosophy into an attractive package."

Taylor began writing about politics from her new Objectivist perspective and soon founded and edited an independent monthly political magazine, Persuasion (1964–1968), the first political magazine ever personally endorsed and recommended by Ayn Rand. In the December 1965 issue of The Objectivist Newsletter, Rand wrote that Persuasion "does a remarkable educational job in tying current political events to wider principles, evaluating specific events in a rational frame-of-reference, and maintaining a high degree of consistency. It is of particular interest and value to all those who are eager to fight on the level of practical politics, but flounder hopelessly for lack of proper material."

Taylor's first book, When to See a Psychologist, written with clinical psychologist Lee M. Shulman, appeared in 1968. In the early 1970s, she worked as a co-therapist with various clinicians at both the Stockbridge, Massachusetts Free Clinic and the Austen Riggs Center. She began studying law in a Manhattan attorney's office and worked her way up to paralegal status. She also began working on behalf of feminist causes, which had gradually attracted her interest since the early 1960s when she read The Feminine Mystique by Betty Friedan.

During the Vietnam War, Joan was part of a group of Objectivists that put together a conference in Washington, DC, in an effort to end the military draft. "It was very successful," she recalled. "We got a couple of hundred people at the conference. [One of the conference speakers,] Martin Anderson, decided that he would like to work on the presidential campaign and he went to see Nixon and he said, 'I'm down here speaking on the economics of the draft and I thought maybe I could persuade you to make [elimination of the draft] one of your issues.' Nixon, who had been raised a Quaker, said yes, he'd be interested. And he hired Marty to be one of his aides. He went from being an aide in the campaign, to being an aide in the White House, to being the person who was the liaison with the commission that was supposed to decide what should be done with the Army. He got them all to decide unanimously for abolishing the draft."

In the mid-1970s, she joined the Libertarian Party and embarked on several years of political activism under its auspices. She helped to write the national party platform in the late 1970s, advised the party's Ed Clark for president campaign of 1980 on feminist issues, and indefatigably promoted the ERA and abortion rights to a party membership that was not particularly receptive to feminist concerns.

In 1977, at the invitation of its editor, Roy A. Childs, Jr., Taylor joined the staff of the monthly magazine Libertarian Review, where she began writing regularly on feminist and other topics. Two years later, she became a regular biweekly commentator on the nationally syndicated daily radio program, Byline, which was underwritten by the libertarian Cato Institute. Soon she was writing for Reason magazine and Inquiry Magazine, as well as the Libertarian Review. In the 1980s, she even spent a brief time as an editor of The Freeman, then as now the oldest libertarian magazine on the market.

As director of the book publishing program of the Manhattan Institute, 1981–1985, Taylor "discovered" a then virtually unknown political scientist named Charles Murray and commissioned him to write the book that became Losing Ground (1984), editing his manuscript as it was written, arranging for its publication by Basic Books, and masterminding the publicity campaign that made it not only a bestseller, but, according to at least one source, one of the seventeen most influential works of sociology ever published.

The last two decades of Taylor's life were devoted almost entirely to her feminist concerns. From 1989 to 2003 she served as national coordinator of the Association of Libertarian Feminists (and as editor of its newsletter), and throughout the 1990s she also served as vice president and as a member of the board of directors of Feminists for Free Expression, a group of which she had been a founding member. She taught courses at the New School (then still the New School for Social Research) – one on "Different Voices: Feminism at the Crossroads" and another on "Women and the Law." As a writer on feminist topics, she contributed to magazines and books, she lectured all over the country, and she published two books of her own, Reclaiming the Mainstream: Individualist Feminism Rediscovered (Prometheus, 1992) and What to Do When You Don't Want to Call the Cops: A Non-Adversarial Approach to Sexual Harassment (New York University Press, 1999).

Early in 2002, Taylor was diagnosed with bladder cancer. Late in 2005 she died from the effects of the cancer and related kidney failure.
