= Roy Childs =

American libertarian essayist and critic (1949–1992)

Roy Alan Childs Jr.
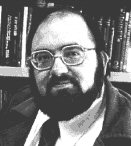
- Childs in the 1980s
- Born: January 4, 1949; Buffalo, New York, United States
- Died: May 22, 1992 (aged 43); Miami, Florida
- Occupations: Essayist, editor
- Writing career
- Language: English
- Period: 1967–1992
- Subject: Politics

Roy Alan Childs Jr. (January 4, 1949 – May 22, 1992) was an American libertarian essayist and critic.

== Career ==
Childs edited the magazine Libertarian Review from 1977 until it folded in 1981. He was also a research fellow and later a policy analyst with the Cato Institute from 1982 to 1984. Childs's most visible public role was as lead book reviewer for Laissez Faire Books in which he produced a number of memorable short essays. He held this position from 1984 until his death.

== Views ==
Childs counted among his early influences Ayn Rand, Ludwig von Mises, Rose Wilder Lane and Robert LeFevre.

In his essay "An Open Letter to Ayn Rand", Childs rejected Objectivism as being true libertarianism, asserting that the establishment of government is in violation of self-ownership and the non-aggression principle. In the 1960s, Childs endorsed anarcho-capitalism, but he later expressed doubts about anarchism. In the 1960s, Ayn Rand wrote an essay entitled "America's Persecuted Minority: Big Business". Childs responded with an essay entitled "Big Business and the Rise of American Statism", writing: "To a large degree it has been and remains big businessmen who are the fountainheads of American statism". In 1982, Childs gave a lecture at the Libertarian Party of New York convention on the origins and consequences of Ronald Reagan's foreign policy and stated his opposition to an interventionist foreign policy.

== Personal life ==
Childs was born in Buffalo, New York, on January 4, 1949. After graduating from high school, he enrolled at the State University of New York at Buffalo with the intention of eventually becoming a college professor. While there, he was offered a full scholarship to attend Rampart College in Larkspur, Colorado, an unaccredited college established by Robert LeFevre to educate students on libertarian views. However, LeFevre's project collapsed soon after Childs arrived and by the fall of 1968 was back at SUNY Buffalo.

For many years, Childs endured difficulties due to obesity. In later years when he lived in New York City, he sometimes weighed over 400 pounds and rarely left his apartment. Childs went to the Pritikin Center in Miami, Florida to take part in a weight loss program. While there, he fell and was taken to a local hospital, where he died on May 22, 1992, at the age of 43.

== Legacy ==
After his death, libertarian scholar Tom G. Palmer wrote: "Roy Childs was one of the finer members of a generation of radical thinkers who worked successfully to revive the tradition of classical liberalism [...] and who dared to launch a frontal challenge to the twentieth-century welfare state. [...] His writings exercised a powerful influence on a generation of young classical liberal thinkers".

The Cato Institute named its in-house library which contained many volumes from his collection after Childs. His personal papers are in an archive at Stanford University. The Center for Independent Thought offers a Roy A. Childs Jr. Fund for Independent Scholars which supports non-academic classical liberal writers.

== Works ==
Childs wrote essays and book reviews which were collected posthumously into anthologies:

- Taylor, Joan Kennedy, ed. (1994). Liberty Against Power. San Francisco: Fox and Wilkes. ISBN 0-930073-13-4. OCLC 34131336. A paperback collection which includes an introduction by Thomas Szasz and a biographical sketch by Taylor.
- Childs, Roy A. Jr. (2012). Anarchism & Justice. Washington, D.C.: Libertarianism.org Press. ISBN 978-1-938048-73-9. An e-book collection with an introduction by George H. Smith.
