= SL =

SL may refer to:

== Arts and entertainment ==
- SL (rapper), a rapper from London
- Second Life, a multi-user 3D virtual world
- Sensei's Library, an Internet site dedicated to the game of Go
- Subdominant leittonwechselklänge
- Leicaflex SL, a mechanical reflex camera
- Leica SL, a mirrorless system camera

== Business and organizations ==
- Sociedad Limitada, the Spanish version of a private limited company → Private limited company § Spain

=== Politics ===
- Serbian Left (Srpska levica), a political party in Serbia
- Stronnictwo Ludowe, a defunct Polish political party
- Student List (Studentska Lista), a Serbian citizens' group
- Soyons Libres, a French political party

=== Transportation and vehicles ===
- SL Corporation, a Korean auto parts company
- Rio Sul Serviços Aéreos Regionais (IATA code SL), a Brazilian airline
- Salt Lake City Southern Railroad (reporting mark SL)
- Stor-Oslo Lokaltrafikk, a public transport operator in Akershus, Norway
- Storstockholms Lokaltrafik, the public transport operator in Stockholm, Sweden
- Thai Lion Air (IATA airline code SL)
- Mercedes-Benz SL-Class, an automobile

=== Trade unions ===
- Association of Social Educators, a trade union in Denmark

== Geography ==
- Sierra Leone, in West Africa, ISO 3166 code
- Saarland, a state of Germany
- SL postcode area of the United Kingdom
- Sungai Long, in Selangor, Malaysia
- Sri Lanka, an island country in South Asia

== Language ==
- Sl (digraph), a Latin-script digraph
- Sign language, used by deaf persons
- Slovene language (ISO 639-1 code "sl")
- Sl, a letter in the Proto-Canaanite abjad

== Science, technology, and mathematics ==
=== Biology ===
- Sensu lato, a term used in taxonomy to mean "in the wider sense" of a definition
- Standard length, a common measurement for fish
- Abbreviation for × Sophrolaelia, an orchid genus

=== Computing ===
- sl, a humorous command in some Unix-based systems that draws an animation of a steam locomotive, intended to be invoked as a typo of ls
- .sl, the country code top-level domain for Sierra Leone
- SL (complexity), a class of computational complexity
- Scientific Linux, a Linux distribution
- Service Loading, a variant of WAP push method
- Supervised learning, one of three broad approaches in machine learning

=== Mathematics ===
- SL (complexity), a class of computational complexity
- sl (elliptic function), sine lemniscate function
- Special linear group in mathematics, denoted SL_{n} or SL(n)
- Special linear Lie algebra, denoted $\mathfrak{sl}_n(F)$ or $\mathfrak{sl}(n, F)$

== Other uses ==
- Serjeant-at-law, a former type of barrister in England and Ireland
- Sine loco in bibliographies means that place of publication is unknown
- Standard Liège, a Belgian professional football club
- Southern League (New Zealand), association football league in New Zealand
- Sublingual administration of medicine
- Surround Left (SL) speaker on a 5.1 surround sound setup

== See also ==
- LS (disambiguation)
- SLS (disambiguation)
