= Space Launch System (disambiguation) =

Space Launch System or variation, may refer to:

- a system for space launch, which include rocket and non-rocket systems
- a launch vehicle system, a rocket vehicle to launch material into orbit
- Space Launch System (NASA SLS), a NASA STS Space Shuttle replacement, super-heavy launcher
- Space Launch System (Turkey) (UFS; Turkish: Uydu Fırlatma Sistemi), a satellite launcher from Turkey
- Space Launching System (USAF SLS), a 1960s U.S. Air Force launch vehicle family proposal

== See also ==
- List of space launch system designs
- SLS (disambiguation)
