= Local Journalism Sustainability Act =

2020 proposed American law

- Long title: To provide tax incentives that support local newspapers and other local media, and for other purposes.
- Announced in: the 117th United States Congress
- Sponsored by: Ann Kirkpatrick (D-AZ)
- Number of co-sponsors: 77

Legislative history
- Introduced in the House of Representatives as H.R. 3940 by Ann Kirkpatrick (D–AZ) on June 16, 2021; Committee consideration by United States House Committee on Ways and Means

The Local Journalism Sustainability Act (H.R. 7640) is a bill introduced into the United States House of Representatives on July 16, 2020, by Representative Ann Kirkpatrick (D-AZ-2) that would give tax credits to local newspapers. It was introduced in 2020 and again in 2021, but was never voted on in the House. It was supported by the media and newspaper industry.

== Provisions ==
The Local Journalism Sustainability Act would provide tax credits to support local newspapers:

- Up to $250 per year per individual to cover 80 percent of subscription fees to local newspapers for the first tax year and 50 percent for subsequent tax years (4-1 match the first year, 1-1 match for an additional four years).
- Up to $12,500 per quarter ($50,000 per year) to reduce employment taxes for a local newspaper to hire and pay journalists.
- Up to $5,000 per year for a small business to cover 80 percent of advertising with local media (local newspapers or broadcast stations) the first year after this act takes effect and up to $2,500 per year for another four years to cover 50 percent of such advertising.

This act defines a "local newspaper" as any print or digital publication whose (A) primary content is news and current events, and (B) at least 51 percent of its readers (including both print and digital versions) reside in a single (i) State or a single possession of the United States, or (ii) area with a 200-mile radius. To qualify, a "local newspaper" must have been in continuous operation for two years prior to the enactment of this bill.

== Legislative History ==
As of October 28, 2022

Congress	Short title	Bill number(s)	Date introduced	Sponsor(s)	# of cosponsors	Latest status
116th Congress	Local Journalism Sustainability Act	H.R.7640	July 16, 2020	Ann Kirkpatrick (D-AZ)	78	Died in committee
117th Congress	Local Journalism Sustainability Act	H.R. 3940	June 16, 2021	Ann Kirkpatrick (D-AZ)	77	Died in committee
117th Congress	Local Journalism Sustainability Act	S. 2434	July 22, 2021	Maria Cantwell (D-WA)	18	Died in committee

== Discussion ==
On July 21, 2020, The Arizona Republic discussed the bill, noting that, “More than 150 news companies and papers have undergone pay cuts, furloughs, layoffs or even shut their doors for good as a result of the pandemic, according to the Poynter Institute, a journalism think tank." More recent reports from the Poynter Institute document further reductions in news.

The bill is supported by multiple organizations concerned about the decline of local newspapers and the threat posed to democracy.

- David Chavern, the president and CEO of News Media Alliance, wrote, "As journalists are on the front lines reporting on the coronavirus crisis, ... local news publishers have been dealt a major blow from the contraction of the local advertising market. The Local Journalism Sustainability Act ... would help ensure local news publishers survive the current crises, and that they are around to cover the next ones."
- Dean Ridings, CEO of America’s Newspapers, reminded readers of what happened to Bell, California, a suburb of Los Angeles with only 37,000 people of modest incomes, after its local newspaper died in 1998 or shortly thereafter: When the Los Angeles Times started reporting on it in 2010, the city was almost bankrupt in spite of major tax increases, because the city council had voted huge increases in annual compensation to roughly $100,000 for council members, $450,000 for the police chief, and almost $800,000 for the city manager.
- Other supporters include Editor & Publisher, an American monthly magazine serving the newspaper industry, and the Hoosier State Press Association.

Jack Shafer, senior media writer for Politico, said, “Nobody will miss newspapers more than me when they finally vanish.” However, publishers and journalists may not honestly report on certain issues and events, given the history of politicians (usually Republicans like Mr. Trump) threatening to defund NPR and PBS when they don't like the coverage. He asked, "You wouldn't put a dead man on a ventilator, would you?"

Editor & Publisher Magazine took a position opposite that of Shafer in a 2020 editorial penned by publisher Mike Blinder. They stated "there are thousands of smaller community newspapers that are still operating with decent profits and serving their communities that lack other news outlets." Blinder continued, "Community publishers generally operate with much more efficiency than the big market dailies and have better relationships with the local advertising community. Plus, they perform a necessary, critical service (as mandated in the Constitution) of making the local government accountable to the people they serve, or as some say: “Speak truth to power.” These are the cities and counties that must continue to have an authoritative, credible voice through this crisis and beyond. Blinder also devoted episodes of his Editor & Publisher podcast series "E&P Reports" to this issue including the following:

- "How the Local Journalism Sustainability Act Can Provide Tax Credits for Advertisers, Subscribers and Our Newsroom Salaries" (January 24, 2020),
- "The Local Journalism Sustainability Act Needs Your Help, Now!" (August 14, 2020),
- "The Time is Now to Support the Local Journalism Sustainability Act" (July 21, 2021), and
- "Urgent and Sustained Advocacy Needed for the LJSA" (November 7, 2021).
