= Inquiry (magazine) =

American libertarian magazine (1977 to 1984)

Inquiry Magazine
- Cover of first issue
- Editors: Williamson M. Evers (November 1977–May 1980); Ronald Hamowy (June–September 1980); Glenn Garvin (October 1980–May 1982); Doug Bandow (June 1982–July 1984)
- Categories: Politics
- Frequency: Biweekly (November 21, 1977–August 21, 1978); Semimonthly (September 18, 1978–May 17, 1982); Monthly (June 1982–July 1984)
- Publisher: Edward H. Crane III; Ralph Raico; Chris Hocker
- Founder: Williamson M. Evers
- Founded: 1977
- First issue: November 21, 1977
- Final issue: July 1984
- Company: Cato Institute (November 1977–January 1982); Libertarian Review Foundation (February 1982–July 1984)
- Country: United States of America
- Language: English
- ISSN: 0148-5008
- OCLC: 3456688

Inquiry Magazine, sometimes titled Inquiry: A Libertarian Review, was a libertarian magazine published from November 1977 to 1984. It was originally published by the Cato Institute, then later transferred to the Libertarian Review Foundation.

== History ==
Inquiry Magazine was founded in 1977 as part of the Cato Institute, in an effort by libertarian donor Charles Koch and Cato president Ed Crane to build public policy institutions for the libertarian movement. Williamson Evers was its first editor. After Evers was ousted as editor in a dispute with Crane, Glenn Garvin took over in 1980. Doug Bandow served as editor from 1982 until the magazine's closure in 1984. At different points in its history, its editorial staffers included Frank Browning, Jonathan Marshall, Mark Paul, Ralph Raico, and Jack Shafer. Its poetry editor was Dana Gioia.

In the early 1980s, Koch and Crane grew dissatisfied with the publishing efforts they supported, which included Inquiry Magazine and the Libertarian Review. They decided to stop publishing the Libertarian Review and move Inquiry Magazine from the Cato Institute to the control of the separately managed Libertarian Review Foundation at the beginning of 1982. With the June 1982 issue, Inquiry Magazine was retitled Inquiry: A Libertarian Review. The magazine's circulation had always been low and had declined below 10,000. Citing financial concerns, Koch and Crane closed the magazine in 1984.

The magazine originally was published biweekly from 1977 to 1978, then switched to semi-monthly, with about 20 issues per year in its first four and a half years of publication. In 1982 it switched to monthly publication, then went to 10 issues a year in 1984. The final issue was published in July 1984.

During its run, it made available bound collections of issues from its first four volumes ('77–'78, '78–'79, '79–'80, '80–'81).

== Audience and viewpoints ==
Established along with Cato, Inquiry was initially a journal of investigative reporting and libertarian-oriented opinion. The magazine was aimed at libertarians and at liberals and leftists critical of state power. It featured regular columns by Nat Hentoff on civil liberties and Thomas Szasz on psychiatry, foreign reporting by Penny Lernoux, and CIA exposes by such writers as David Wise and Fred Landis. It included extensive cultural coverage as well, including reviews by Anthony Burgess and film criticism by Stephen Harvey.
