= Leica TL =

Digital mirrorless interchangeable lens camera

Overview
- Maker: Leica
- Released: November 2016

Lens
- Lens mount: Leica L mount

Sensor/medium
- Sensor type: CMOS
- Sensor size: 23.6 × 15.7 mm (APS-C type)
- Maximum resolution: 4944 × 3278 (16 megapixels)
- Film speed: 125–12500
- Recording medium: SD, SDHC, or SDXC memory card

Shutter
- Shutter speeds: 1/4000 s to 30 s
- Continuous shooting: 5 frames per second

Viewfinder
- Viewfinder: Electronic
- Viewfinder magnification: 0.7
- Frame coverage: 100%

Image processing
- White balance: Yes

General
- LCD screen: 3.7 inches with 1,300,000 dots
- Dimensions: 134 × 69 × 33 mm (5.28 × 2.72 × 1.3 inches)
- Weight: 384 g (14 oz) including battery
- Made in: Germany

The Leica TL is a digital mirrorless interchangeable lens camera announced by Leica Camera in November, 2016. It is the successor model of the Leica T (Typ 701).

The camera uses an L lens mount (previously known as the T mount).
