= SLS =

SLS may refer to the Space Launch System, a launch vehicle developed by NASA. It may also refer to:

== Education ==
- Stanford Law School, California, U.S.
- Sydney Law School, Australia
- Symbiosis Law School, India
- Same language subtitling, of TV
- Student Learning Space, an online educational platform in Singapore where teachers can assign online homework to students in schools.

== Places ==
- Sim Lim Square, a shopping centre, Singapore
- SLS Las Vegas, a hotel and casino, US

== Politics ==
- Former Samostalna liberalna stranka (Independent Liberal Party (Kosovo))
- Former Srpska liberalna stranka (Serbian Liberal Party)
- Slovenska ljudska stranka (Slovenian People's Party)
- Slovenská ľudová strana (Slovak People's Party, SĽS)
- Students for a Libertarian Society, an American student organisation

== Science and technology ==
- Selective laser sintering, an additive manufacturing technique
- Sea level standard conditions
- Sodium lauryl sulfate, a surfactant
- Static light scattering, a technique to measure molecular weight
- Standard linear solid model, of a viscoelastic material
- Streptolysin S, a bacterial exotoxin
- Swiss Light Source, a synchrotron

=== Computing ===
- Scalable Lossless Coding, an MPEG-4 Audio extension
- Select-String or sls, a Powershell cmdlet
- Single-level store, in computer storage
- Softlanding Linux System, a Linux distribution

=== Transport ===
- Cadillac Seville Luxury Sedan, an automobile
- Mercedes-Benz SLS AMG, an automobile
- Stephenson Locomotive Society, UK, founded 1909
- Space Launching System, a 1960s USAF rocket program
- Space Launch System, an American super heavy-lift expendable launch vehicle under development by NASA since 2011
- Space Launch System (Turkey), a project to develop the satellite launch capability of Turkey

== Other uses ==
- Street League Skateboarding, a tournament
- Sign language in Singapore (ISO 639 language code: sls)
- Shit Life Syndrome, a term used by physicians
- Somaliland Shilling, currency of the Republic of Somaliland

== See also ==
- SL (disambiguation), for the singular of "SLs"
