= Timothy P. Roth =

American economist

Timothy Peter Roth (born December 11, 1943) is the A.B. Templeton Professor and Chairman of the Department of Economics & Finance at the University of Texas at El Paso.

He is a recipient of the university's 2005 Distinguished Achievement Award for Research Excellence. He served as a Consultant to President Ronald Reagan's Cabinet Council on Economic Policy, as executive director of President Reagan's Steel Advisory Committee, and as Senior Economic Adviser in the Office of Secretary of Commerce Malcolm Baldrige. Previously he served as Senior Economist for the U.S. Congress Joint Economic Committee. Roth served two terms on the Texas Sunset Advisory Commission, and was a Member of the Texas Growth Fund Board of Trustees, and of the Governor's Texas Task Force on Appraisal reform. He is also an elected member of the El Paso Business Hall of Fame. Dr. Roth's academic work includes the publication of eleven books, numerous journal articles, and technical monographs for the U.S. Congress Joint Economic Committee.

== Books ==
- Timothy P. Roth (1 January 2004). Equality, Rights, and the Autonomous Self: Toward a Conservative Economics. E. Elgar. ISBN 978-1-84376-450-2.
- Timothy P. Roth (1 January 2010). Politicians, Economists and the Supreme Court at Work: The Founders Betrayed. Edward Elgar Publishing. ISBN 978-1-84980-900-9.
- Timothy P. Roth (30 May 2014). Economists and the State: What Went Wrong. Edward Elgar Publishing. ISBN 978-1-78195-193-4.
