= Karl T. Pflock =

American novelist

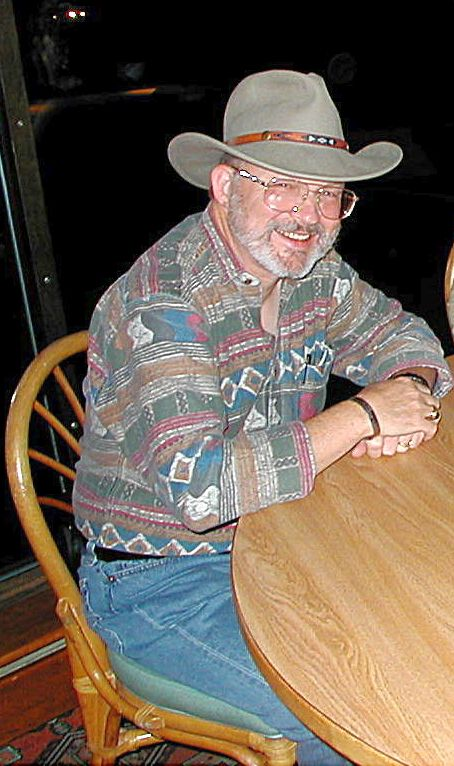
- Karl T. Pflock
- Born: January 6, 1943; San Jose, California
- Died: June 5, 2006(aged 63); Placitas, New Mexico
- Education: San Jose State University
- Occupations: Government official; writer; UFOlogist
- Spouse: Mary Martinek
- Writing career
- Notable works: Roswell: Inconvenient Facts and the Will to Believe

Karl Tomlinson Pflock (January 6, 1943 – June 5, 2006) was a CIA intelligence officer, Deputy Assistant Secretary of Defense in the Reagan Administration, strategic planner, UFO researcher, and author of both fiction and non-fiction. He was best known for his book Roswell: Inconvenient Facts and the Will to Believe.

== Background ==
Pflock was born in San Jose, California, in 1943. He was the son of Ernst H. Pflock (pronounced "flock" without the 'p'), a book retailer, and Eleanor (née Bracey), an educator. His interest in UFOs started as a young boy when he overheard his friends' fathers discussing a flying saucer containing "little alien guys" that had, allegedly, crashed in the Southwest. "If something like this captures your imagination at that stage of life," he told a San Francisco Examiner reporter, "you never get rid of it. It's in the blood."

He attended San Jose State University and, in 1964, graduated cum laude with a bachelor's degree in philosophy and political science.

From 1960 to 1966, he served in the Marines and Air Force as a reservist.

On February 7, 1986, Pflock married Mary E. Martinek, a government affairs director. They had zero children (she had two and he had 4 from prior marriages).

== Career ==
After graduation, Pflock was employed at IBM in San Jose, CA, before becoming an intelligence officer with the Central Intelligence Agency in 1966. He remained in that post until 1972.

In 1972, Pflock was hired by the American Enterprise Institute, where he worked full-time as a senior editor. During this time, he also served as consulting or contributing editor to Arlington House Publishers, Libertarian Review, Reason magazine, and Eternity Science Fiction.

In 1981, Pflock was appointed senior staff member and publications director of the House Republican Conference, working for Jack Kemp primarily on matters of defense. In 1983, he served as Special Assistant for Defense, Space, and Science and Technology to Ken Kramer before being appointed Deputy Assistant Secretary of Defense for Operational Test and Evaluation in 1985. He served under the Reagan Administration.

From 1989 to 1992, Pflock worked as a senior strategic planner for BDM International, the U.S. Department of Energy and other corporate agencies. His focus was on environmental restoration and waste management of nuclear test sites.

=== Books ===
==== Roswell in Perspective ====
In 1992, Pflock began to research and write about UFOs full-time. He focused his research on Roswell, the 1947 incident in which material—metallic fabric glued to strange sticks—was recovered from an alleged alien crash site. For many believers, this physical evidence proved their case for the existence of flying saucers.

In 1994, Pflock wrote his findings in a report titled Rosewell in Perspective published by the Fund for UFO Research. At the time, Pflock determined that "no flying saucer or saucers crashed in the general vicinity of Roswell or on the Plains of San Agustin in 1947." Pflock also linked the debris found at the Roswell site to Project Mogul, a military balloon experiment meant to detect Soviet nuclear tests. The debris was not alien, but material used to make the balloons. While Pflock continued to believe in the existence of alien spacecraft, he ruled out Roswell, saying it was a "case of mistaken identity". After the report was made public, Pflock drew the ire of the UFO community, who called him, derisively, a "debunker".

==== Roswell: Inconvenient Facts and the Will to Believe ====
In 2001, findings from Plfock's eight-year investigation of the Roswell Incident were published in a book titled Roswell: Inconvenient Facts and the Will to Believe, published by Prometheus. In the book, Pflock outlines his journey from "hopeful agnostic" to a close examination of the photos, drawings, eyewitness reports, and declassified accounts of the incident which lead him to conclude that no evidence existed to support claims of a crashed flying saucer at Roswell. It was Project Mogul, with its high-altitude balloons designed to detect Soviet nuclear tests, not an alien space ship or bodies, that the government wanted kept secret in their, purportedly, botched press conferences. Research for the project was conducted by New York University on behalf of the U.S. Army Air Force. The materials found at the crash site in New Mexico, with its alleged "hieroglyphics", were made by a novelty company based in New York and consistent with reports made at the time by people who were at the crash site. The UFO community rejected Pflock's findings. Reviewers called Roswell: Inconvenient Facts and the Will to Believe the "definitive book" on Roswell, with its comprehensive, closely reasoned, and evidence-based look at the event.

Roswell is a classic example of the triumph of quantity over quality. The advocates of the crashed-saucer tale, wittingly or not, simply shovel everything that seems to support their views into the box labeled 'Evidence' and say, 'See? Look at all this stuff. We must be right. Never mind the contradictions. Never mind the lack of independent supporting fact. Never mind the blatant absurdities.

— Karl T. Pflock

==== Shockingly Close to the Truth: Confessions of a Grave-Robbing Ufologist ====
In 2002, Pflock and James W. Moseley collaborated on a book called Shockingly Close to the Truth: Confessions of a Grave-Robbing Ufologist, published by Prometheus. It is an autobiographical account of Moseley's serious and prankish experiences with ufology, including the hoaxing and UFO landing site in 1954 and using fake UFO footage during lectures. The book includes coverage of Andy "The Mystic Barber" Sinatra, Donald Keyhoe and Budd Hopkins.

==== Encounters at Indian Head: The Betty and Barney Hill UFO Abduction Revisited ====
Pflock's next book was Encounters at Indian Head: The Betty and Barney Hill UFO Abduction Revisited, published by Anomalist Books posthumously.

== Death ==
In 2005, Pflock was diagnosed with amyotrophic lateral sclerosis. He died June 5, 2006, in Placitas, New Mexico, at age 63.

== Memberships and editorial positions ==
- Scientific Fiction and Fantasy Writers of America (member)
- American Aviation Historical Society
- Society for Scientific Exploration
- Center for UFO Studies
- Reagan Alumni Association
- Mutual UFO Network

== Awards ==
- Defense Outstanding Public Service Medal (1989)
- Ufologist of the Year (1998)

== Selected articles ==
- Star Witness: The Mortician of Roswell Breaks his Code of Silence (1995)
- UFOs for RAND Use Only (1997)
- What's Really Behind the Flying Saucers? A New Twist on Aztec (2000)

== Books ==
- Roswell in Perspective (1994)
- Roswell: Inconvenient Facts and the Will to Believe (June, 2001) ISBN 978-1-573-92894-6
- Shockingly Close to the Truth: Confessions of a Grave-Robbing Ufologist, with James W. Moseley (March 2002) ISBN 978-1-573-92991-2
- Encounters at Indian Head: The Betty and Barney Hill UFO Abduction Revisited, co-editor with Peter Brookesmith ISBN 978-1-933-66518-4
