= Leica SL2 =

2019 full-frame mirrorless camera

Overview
- Maker: Leica
- Type: Mirrorless full-frame system camera

Lens
- Lens mount: Leica L mount

Sensor/medium
- Sensor type: CMOS
- Sensor size: 36 mm × 24 mm (1.42 in × 0.94 in)
- Sensor maker: Nuvoton (ex Panasonic)
- Maximum resolution: 8368 x 5584 (47.3 MP)
- Film speed: 50 to 50000
- Recording medium: DNG: 8368 x 5584 pixels (46.7 MP) JPG: 8368 x 5584 pixels (46.7 MP), 6000 x 4000 pixels (24 MP), 4272 x 2848 pixels (12 MP)
- Storage media: UHS-II (recommended), UHS-I, SD/SDHC/SDXC memory card

Focusing
- Focus modes: Smart AF (autonomously selects AFs and AFc), AFs (picture taken only after successful focusing), AFc (picture can be taken at any time), AF setting can be saved

Exposure/metering
- Exposure: TTL (‚Through The Lens‘ exposure metering)

Flash
- Flash: Built-in hot shoe

Shutter
- Shutter speeds: 30 s to 1/8000
- Continuous shooting: 20 fps

Viewfinder
- Viewfinder: Resolution: 5,760,000 dots, 120 fps
- Viewfinder magnification: 0.78 x
- Frame coverage: 100%

Image processing
- White balance: Yes

General
- Video recording: MOV 5K: 29.97 fps, 25 fps, 23.98 fps / MOV C4K: 59.94 fps, 50 fps, 29.97 fps, 25 fps, 24 fps / MOV 4K: 59.94 fps, 50 fps, 29.97 fps, 25 fps, 23.98 fps / MOV FHD: 180 fps, 150 fps, 120 fps, 100 fps, 59.94 fps, 50 fps, 29.97 fps, 25 fps, 23.98 fps / MP4 4 K: 59.94 fps, 50 fps, 29.97 fps, 25 fps, 23.98 fps / MP4 FHD: 180 fps, 150 fps, 120 fps, 100 fps, 59.94 fps, 50 fps, 29.97 fps, 25 fps, 23.98 fps
- LCD screen: 3.2“ inches with 2,100,000 dots
- Dimensions: 146 mm × 107 mm × 42 mm (5.7 in × 4.2 in × 1.7 in)
- Weight: 825 g (29.1 oz)
- Made in: Germany

The Leica SL2 is a full-frame mirrorless interchangeable-lens camera released by Leica Camera on 6 November 2019. The camera uses the Leica L-Mount lenses range and is part of the L-Mount Alliance of camera bodies that Leica co-developed with Panasonic and Sigma.

The camera has 47 MP full frame CMOS sensor with sensor-shift image stabilization built into the camera. With this technology the camera can move the sensor in order to produce 187 MP images. The Leica SL2 succeeded the Leica SL (Typ 601). The camera's body has been completely redesigned, with altered ergonomics, new buttons and touchscreen. The camera's touchscreen liquid-crystal display is now 3.2" in size with 2.1 million dots, while the electronic viewfinder's resolution has been boosted to 5.76 million dots. The new Maestro III processor allows for faster AF than its predecessor as well as 20 fps burst shooting with the electronic shutter or 10 fps with the mechanical shutter. The camera has two SD card slots, both of which are compatible with high-speed UHS-II media. The camera has earned the IP54 rating for weather-sealing. The Leica SL2 can also capture DCI and UHD 4K resolution video at 60 frames/sec and up to 180 fps in Full HD mode. When placed into 'Cine' mode, the terminology and displays on the SL2 become video-specific. The Leica SL2 has both microphone and headphone sockets, as well as a full-size HDMI port. The successor to the Leica SL2 is the Leica SL2-S, which features a 24-megapixel sensor, diversifying the SL range with a focus on sensitivity and speed.
