= Jack Shafer =

American journalist

Jack Shafer (born November 14, 1951) is an American journalist who wrote about media for Politico until June 2024. Prior to joining Politico, he worked for Reuters, wrote and edited for Slate, and edited two city weeklies, Washington City Paper and SF Weekly.

Much of Shafer's writing focuses on what he sees as a lack of precision and rigor in reporting by the mainstream media, which he says "thinks its duty is to keep you cowering in fright." He has frequently written about media coverage of the war on drugs.

== Early life and education ==
Jack Shafer was born on November 14, 1951, and grew up in Kalamazoo, Michigan, describing himself as "the son of lapsed Catholics". As a newspaper boy in his youth, he delivered hardcopies of the Kalamazoo Gazette for five years. He chose not to do an undergraduate journalism degree, graduating instead from Western Michigan University with a B.A. in communications. In his first five years after graduation, Shafer lived in California, "then hitched through Asia, New Zealand and Australia".

== Career ==
Shafer has been writing and editing as an American journalist since the 1980s, and writing as a columnist since the early 2000s. After his postgraduate travels, he returned to the United States and freelanced until being hired as a managing editor by the libertarian magazine Inquiry; he would remain with it until it ceased publication in 1984. Early, Shafer would also do editing for SF Weekly.

Washington City Paper's Russ Smith hired Shafer as an editor in 1985—described by Mark Lisheron of the American Journalism Review as "his [Shafer's] real break"—a position he'd hold until he joined Slate magazine online, after departing City Paper in 1995. About Smith's hiring, Shafer said, "I will always be grateful, although I reserve the right to be peculiar about how I express that gratitude".

At Slate, he wrote about the media and other topics; his 15 years of writing and editing there included penning its "Press Box" column, which he began in 2000. He was laid off with a number of others by Slate in August 2011, going on to work for Reuters, before joining Politico. Shafer wrote most recently about media for Politico (through June 2024).

== Significant series ==
=== Posner plagiarism reporting ===
Responding to and confirming a reader tip, Shafer reported that Gerald Posner, The Daily Beast's chief investigative reporter, had plagiarized—presented "identical or nearly identical"—sentences (five in number) from a single story published by The Miami Herald. Thereafter, Posner issued a "no-reservation mea culpa", The Daily Beast published a correction, and Shafer responded with approval for the acknowledgment, by both, of the plagiarism.

However, three days later, Shafer published further cases perceived as plagiarism—content from a Miami Herald blog, a Miami Herald editorial, Texas Lawyer and a health care journalism blog—from Posner's work, leading to Posner's departure from The Daily Beast. Posner offered an explanation of ways in which the plagiarism might have occurred, and explanation which has received critical review.

== Perspectives ==
Much of Shafer's writing focuses on what he sees as a lack of precision and rigor in reporting by the mainstream media, which he says "thinks its duty is to keep you cowering in fright." He has frequently written about media coverage of the war on drugs.

=== On journalistic awards ===
Shafer "famously had zero use for [journalistic] awards", which "he groused, were a parade of self-congratulatory 'industry peacockery'", and so did not seek them out (the irony of which has been noted, given articles of his, e.g., "So You Won a Pulitzer: Who Cares?"). In his further writing on the subject, he proposed consideration of new awards categories, including "Most Compromised Local Paper", "Most Predictable Critic", "Most Tractable White House Reporter", and "Worst Editorial Page".

=== On his libertarianism ===
Shafer wrote early in his career—through the early 1980s—for Inquiry, a libertarian magazine, and has written about "his own libertarian politics"; he has asserted in interview, however, that "they are driven in their criticism by a deep suspicion of authority more than any particular ideology". In particular, he appreciates approaches to criticism that are "clear-eyed", an attribute he ascribes to two "unapologetic leftists" that he admires, A.J. Liebling and Alexander Cockburn (having written a "paean" to Liebling, whom he is said to idolise).

In 2000, following the U.S. national elections, he presented his views as follows:

I agree with the Libertarian Party platform: much smaller government, much lower taxes, an end to income redistribution, repeal of the drug laws, fewer gun laws, a dismantled welfare state, an end to corporate subsidies, First Amendment absolutism, a scaled-back warfare state. (You get the idea.)"

Later he wrote, "Traditionally, the state censors and marginalizes voices while private businesses tend to remain tolerant."

On April 20, 2020, Shafer expressed opposition to the Local Journalism Sustainability Act, saying, "You wouldn't put a dead man on a ventilator, would you?".

== Rebuttals ==
Judith Miller, writing in her 2015 autobiography, harshly addresses Shafer's criticism of what he termed was her "wretched" reporting on Iraq in The New York Times—in at least six of his pieces in Slate—referring to his writing as "assaults" or "personal attacks", to his own reporting as "erroneou[s]", and arguing that he "never once sought a response from me", suggesting that his motivation was to achieve "buzz and internet clicks".

== Personal life ==
Shafer is married to Nicole Arthur, who has worked as a features editor in the Style section of The Washington Post; they have two daughters. Mark Lisheron's article in the AJR describes him as "follow[ing] baseball, but... repelled by the $9 cup of beer at the park", and as one who has "force[d] himself outdoors... add[ing] birding to hiking, which has taken him from Newfoundland to the Galapagos Islands".
