= Williamson Evers =

American political consultant (born 1948)

- Born: October 18, 1948 (age 77); San Francisco, California, U.S.
- Education: Stanford University (BA, MA, PhD)
- Political party: Libertarian (before 2000); Republican (2000–present)

Williamson M. "Bill" Evers (born October 18, 1948) is a former American libertarian activist and education researcher. In 1988, he became a resident scholar at Stanford University's Hoover Institution first as a national fellow, then as a visiting scholar, and most recently as a research fellow there and at The Independent Institute. He went on leave from Hoover to serve as Assistant Secretary for the Office of Planning, Evaluation and Policy Development in the United States Department of Education in 2007 to 2009. At the beginning of September 2016, he was selected to lead the "agency action team" for the Department of Education in the Trump-Pence transition.

== Political activism ==
During the 1970s and '80s, Evers was involved in the libertarian movement in the United States and the Libertarian Party specifically. In 1980, he was the Libertarian Party candidate for Congress in the 12th Congressional District of California. For several years he edited the libertarian magazine Inquiry. "Evers was the first editor of Inquiry which was initially published by the Cato Institute. He was abruptly fired in a nasty internal power dispute with Cato president Ed Crane." At the time, he was considered a radical (he was a prominent member of the party's Radical Caucus) and an ally of Murray Rothbard against Crane and his supporters. In 1984, Evers was campaign director for Libertarian Party presidential candidate David Bergland. In 1993, he helped defeat an effort to eliminate the LP membership Pledge and moderate the LP Platform. He was still a member of the Libertarian National Committee as of March 1996.

In the late 1990s, Evers began to work in the Republican Party, serving on George W. Bush's transition team after the 2000 election and acting as a Bush adviser in the 2000 and 2004 campaigns and as a McCain adviser in 2008 and a Romney adviser in the 2012 presidential elections. In California, Evers has also served on the Republican State Central Committee and acted as an adviser to several Republican gubernatorial campaigns.

== Education activism ==
In 1995, while one of his children was a third-grader at Escondido Elementary School in the Palo Alto Unified School District in California, Evers became an outspoken participant in the Math Wars over the teaching of mathematics. He became a leading member of the steering committee of a group called HOLD (Honest Open Logical Debate) on Math Reform and organized a publicity stunt in which a toilet was mounted on the back of a pick-up truck and driven to a protest outside the school district headquarters. There Evers ceremonially flushed the new curriculum.

Evers was a commissioner on the California State Academic Standards Commission from 1996 to 1998 and again in 2010. At the Hoover Institution, he joined its Koret Task Force on K–12 Education, which was formed in 1999 and wound up its operations in 2014.

In 2001, he was appointed by President George W. Bush to the White House Commission on Presidential Scholars and was appointed by Education Secretary Rod Paige to the National Educational Research Policy and Priorities Board. From July to December 2003, he served as a senior education adviser to the Coalition Provisional Authority during the U.S. occupation of Iraq. In 2004 he was elected to the Santa Clara County Board of Education in California, on which he served until 2007.

On February 8, 2007, Bush nominated Evers to be an assistant secretary of education. His confirmation by the Senate was announced on October 17, 2007. The eight-month delay was largely attributed to enemies he made during the Math Wars.

Evers has written several opinion columns for well-known publications such as The New York Times, The Wall Street Journal, The Los Angeles Times, and The Christian Science Monitor.

== Bibliography ==
- Evers, Williamson (1987). Limits of liberty of the press in political theory from Milton to Hocking (Ph.D.). Stanford University. OCLC 224394115.
- Evers, Williamson M (1996). Victims' rights, restitution, and retribution. Oakland, Calif.: Independent Institute. OCLC 35597897.
- Evers, Williamson M (1998). What's Gone Wrong in America's Classrooms. Hoover Institution Press. ISBN 9780817995324. OCLC 954330741.
- Evers, Williamson (2000). "Liberty of the Press under Socialism". In Anderson, Annelise Graebner (ed.). Political money : deregulating American politics : selected writings on campaign finance reform. Hoover Institution Press. OCLC 43311782.
- Evers, Williamson M; Izumi, Lance T; Riley, Pamela A (2001). School Reform: The Critical Issues. Hoover Institution Press. ISBN 0-8179-2872-3. OCLC 425625007.
- Evers, Williamson M; Walberg, Herbert J (2002). School Accountability. Hoover Institution Press. OCLC 425814494.
- Evers, Williamson M; Izumi, Lance T (2002). Teacher Quality. Hoover Institution Press. OCLC 843881974.
- Evers, Williamson (2000). "The curricular smorgasbord". In Peterson, Paul E.; Chubb, John E (eds.). Our schools and our future : – are we still at risk?. Hoover Institution Press. OCLC 51258363.
- Evers, Williamson M; Walberg, Herbert J (2004). Testing student learning, evaluating teaching effectiveness. Hoover Institution Press. OCLC 54111561.
- Evers, Williamson; Izumi, Lance T. (2005). "Fixing Failing Schools in California". In Chubb, John E (ed.). Within Our Reach: How America Can Educate Every Child. Rowman & Littlefield. ISBN 0742548872. OCLC 57676010.
- Evers, Williamson M.; Clopton, Paul (2006). "High-spending, low-performing school districts". Courting failure : how school finance lawsuits exploit judges' good intentions and harm our children. OCLC 70106835.
- Evers, Williamson M. (2010). "Standards and Competitive Rigor". American education in 2030. OCLC 694173790.
