= Freefly Systems =

American manufacturing company

- Industry: Unmanned Aircraft Systems
- Founded: 2011
- Founders: Tabb Firchau, David Bloomfield, Hugh Bell, Megan Fogel
- Headquarters: Woodinville, Washington, U.S.
- Number of locations: 1
- Products: Mōvi, CineStar, Alta, Tero, Mimic, Wave, Ember, Astro
- Number of employees: 70
- Website: freeflysystems.com

Freefly Systems is an American corporation that designs, manufactures, and markets camera movement systems and camera stabilizers used in cinematography including unmanned aerial vehicles for aerial cinematography, gimbals, and remote controlled vehicles. The company headquarters are in Woodinville, Washington.

Freefly Systems gained notoriety within the digital video production industry after the launch of the Mōvi M10 camera stabilizer that provided a smaller and lighter alternative to the Steadicam. The Mōvi M10 eliminated the need for camera operators to wear a harness with an iso-elastic arm and counterbalance weight to get steady shots.

== History ==
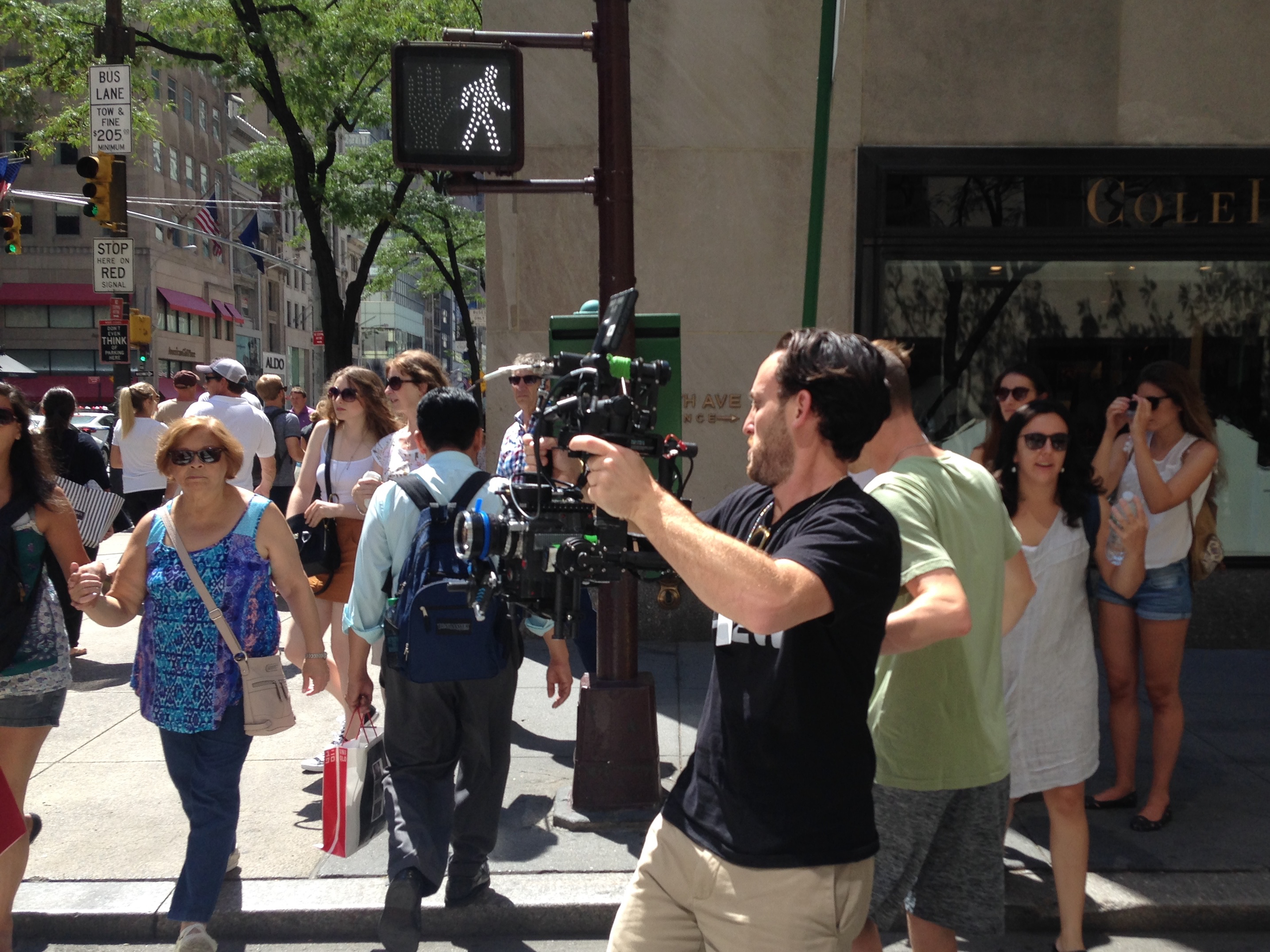
Filming with the MoVI M10.

Freefly Systems was cofounded in 2011 by Tabb Firchau, David Bloomfield, Hugh Bell and Megan Fogel. Its first product was the CineStar, a multirotor camera platform. The CineStar gained popularity among professional users due to its simplicity, and adaptability.

In 2013, the company launched its Mōvi® M10 stabilized camera gimbal at 2013 NAB Show winning the InGear Technical Products Award and Digital Video Magazine's Black Diamond Award. In 2014, the Mōvi M5 was debuted as a more affordable stabilizer in the Mōvi product line and was named "BEST Stabilizer" of 2014 by the editors of Videomaker Magazine.

At the 2015 NAB Show, Freefly unveiled the ALTA™ small UAV, a ready-to-fly, multirotor platform for aerial cinematographers. Most notably, the ALTA allows for camera payloads to be top-mounted as well as bottom-mounted. The company also announced the MIMIC controller, enabling remote camera movement on the Mōvi by physically tilting, rolling, and panning the controller.

== Products ==
=== Camera Stabilizers ===
Freefly initially built gimbals for use in stabilizing footage captured with its line of CineStar sUAV. This CineStar gimbal product line consisted of a 2-axis and 3-axis servo based gimbal with a proprietary RADIAN stabilization module. In 2013 Freefly launched its Mōvi line of brushless gimbals with the M10 3-axis handheld camera stabilizer. Mōvi stabilizers incorporate a proprietary quick-release system and an optional mount adapter which allow the stabilizers to be changed from handheld, aerial, tripod, dolly, jib, or cable mounts.

- CineStar 2-Axis Gimbal: Released November 2011. Designed for aerial cinematography, the CineStar gimbal used a 5 mm (0.20 in) thick piece of carbon fiber mounted to a 25 mm (0.98 in) cross tube to hold the camera in place. The gimbal supporting cameras with up to a maximum width of 6.2 inches (160 mm) and height of 5.11 inches (130 mm).
- CineStar 3-Axis Gimbal: Released February 2012. Designed for professional dual-operator aerial cinematography, the CineStar 3-Axis Gimbal allowed for unrestricted 360-degree panning.
- Radian: Released September 2012 is first stabilization system add on for the CineStar (and other) gimbals. Before the Radian, Drone gimbals required manual stabilization or very crude adaption of an RC helicopter tail gyro and servo.
- Mōvi M10: Announced April 6, 2013 at NAB. The Mōvi M10 is the first handheld electronic camera stabilizer. The M10 features direct drive brushless motors and digitally stabilized mounted cameras using a proprietary 3-axis gimbal resulting in perfectly smooth and jitter-free footage. The M10 also provided the functionality of being operated both by a single operator in a patented Majestic mode and in dual-operator mode where a second operator could use a remote control to frame shots. The Mōvi M10 full camera cage dimensions are 5.51 inches (140 mm) long by 7.87 inches (200 mm) wide and high and the camera stabilizer supports a maximum payload of 12 lb (5.4 kg).
- Mōvi M5: Released in April 2014, the M5 retained the features of the M10 but supported a lower maximum payload of 5 lb (2.3 kg). The M5 incorporated a clamping top mount to aid in stabilization of DSLR cameras with camera cage dimensions of 5.11 inches (130 mm) by 7.08 inches (180 mm) wide and 4.78 inches (121 mm) high.
- Mōvi M15: The M15 was released in September 2014 and designed to stabilize heavier digital cameras, supporting a maximum payload of 15 lbs. The M15's camera cage measurements are 7.99 inches (203 mm) long and wide by 8.75 inches (222 mm) high.
- Mōvi Pro: Announced on Nov 2, 2016, the Mōvi Pro was designed with integrated hot swap smart batteries, built in stand, and many other ease of use/performance enhancements.
- Mōvi XL: Announced on April 22, 2017 at the NAB show. Mōvi XL is a high end stabilizer with up to a 50lb payload it is designed specifically for large cameras and cinema lenses. This is a disruptive product in a market which was previously dominated by high cost rentals.
- Mōvi Carbon: Announced on April 22, 2017 at the NAB show. The Mōvi Carbon is the world's first handheld 5 axis camera stabilizer.
- Movi Cinema Robot: Announced Dec 6, 2017 the Movi is Freefly's first cinema robot designed for smart phones.

=== Filming Accessories ===
- Mōvi Controller: Mōvi Controller is a wireless joystick based system where all camera and stabilizer operations are housed in one package.
- Mimic: Announced April 7, 2015. Mimic is the world's first intuitive gesture based wireless control system for camera stabilizers.
- Pilot: Pilot is a module based configurable control system for cameras and camera stabilizers. "Pilot gives users exquisite control over Focus / Iris / Zoom, Mōvi pointing, and Mōvi settings wirelessly."

=== Unmanned aerial vehicles ===
Freefly manufactures unmanned aerial vehicles and compatible drone accessories used in photography and cinematography. The CineStar was Freefly's first commercial product aimed at the professional aerial cinematographer market. Two models were launched in 2011, the CineStar 6 hexacopter and the CineStar 8 octocopter. On 3 August 2015, Freefly launched a ready-to-fly and ready-to film hexacopter called the ALTA.

- CineStar 6: The CineStar 6 is a heavy-lift hexacopter that allowed a modular approach to assembling the UAV. The diameter of the CineStar 6 is 47.4 inches (1,200 mm) and the drone is constructed of carbon fiber, weighing in at 5.8 lbs (2,650 g).
- CineStar 8: The CineStar 8 is multi-rotor helicopter constructed with carbon fiber booms and frame and eight rotors providing "excellent stability to ensure blur-free shots." The Cinestar requires initial assembly of the eight booms to the main hub. The CineStar 8 is 53.0 inches (1,350 mm) in diameter, constructed of carbon fiber and weighs 6.7 lbs (3,050 g). The Cinestar 8 was designed to lift large DSLR cameras with an optimal total payload weight of 12.3 to 12.7 lb (5.6 to 5.8 kg) which includes camera, mount and batteries.
- Alta 6: The Alta 6 is a 6-rotor, ready-to-fly helicopter designed to carry a payload of up to 15 lb (6.8 kg) including both gimbal and professional camera. The notable difference between the CineStar and the ALTA is the full integration of all subsystems (flight control, motors, motor drives, props) to create a ready-to-fly/film platform. The Alta 6 is also recognized as the first UAV to allow mounting the camera/gimbal on the top or the bottom of the aircraft. Other improvements include the addition of a built-in flight controller called the Synapse, foldable booms that pack down to a 21.6 inches (550 mm) diameter, and a custom Pelican™ case for transportation. The Alta 6's unfolded diameter is 44.3 inches (1,130 mm) and it weighs 10 lb (4.5 kg).

Mōvi M15 used for a low angle shot

=== Unmanned ground vehicle ===
In 2014, Freefly Systems released the TERO remote-controlled car providing cinematographers with an alternative tool to create low-angle tracking shots without the need to lay track. Additionally, the TERO is noted to be a good tool for capturing car tracking shots and extreme sports.

- TERO: Released in August 2014, the TERO was designed to mount gimbal and camera to an aluminum cheese plate supported with custom-tuned wire rope isolators to ensure smooth camera footage. The RC car uses run-flat tires and brushless motors reaching a max speed estimate of 55 miles per hour (89 km/h). Its overall dimensions are 31 inches (790 mm) in length by 18 inches (460 mm) by 10 inches (250 mm) high and it weighs 20 lb (9.1 kg).
