= Leica SL (Typ 601) =

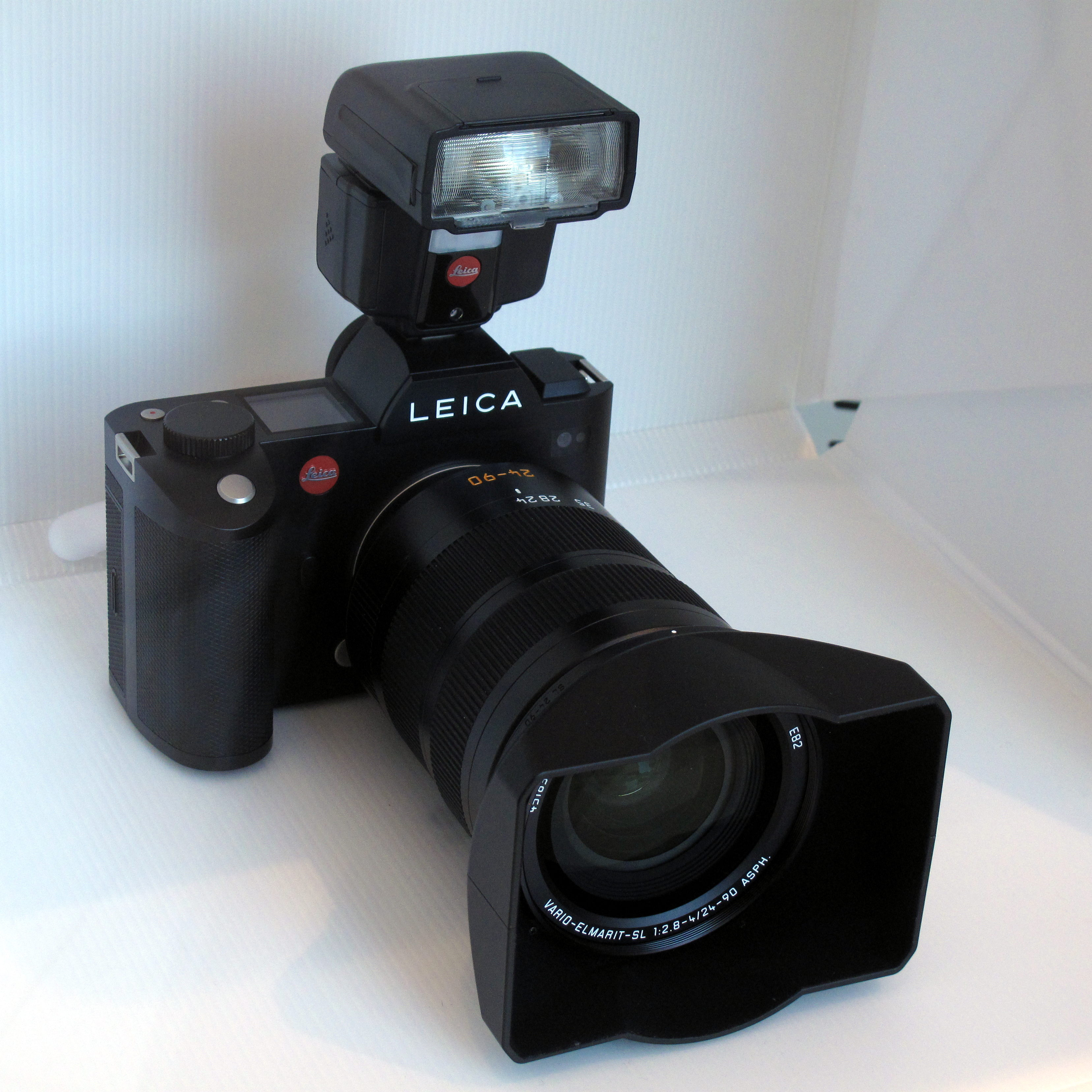

Overview
- Maker: Leica Camera AG
- Type: Full-frame mirrorless interchangeable-lens camera
- Released: 20 October 2015
- Intro price: $5,995

Lens
- Lens mount: Leica L mount

Sensor/medium
- Sensor type: 24MP full-frame CMOS
- Sensor size: 36 × 24mm (Full-frame)
- Maximum resolution: 6,000 × 4,000 (24 megapixels)
- Film speed: ISO 50–50,000
- Recording medium: Two SD/SDHC/SDXC memory card slots (UHS-II supported on slot 1, UHS-I on slot 2)

Focusing
- Focus: Contrast AF system
- Focus areas: 529 focus points

Flash
- Flash: no internal flash, flash out shoe for optional flash systems

Shutter
- Shutter: Mechanical & electronic shutter mode
- Shutter speeds: 1/16,000s to 30minutes
- Continuous shooting: 11 frames per second

Viewfinder
- Viewfinder: LCOS, 4.4 million dots
- Viewfinder magnification: 0.8×
- Frame coverage: 100%

Image processing
- Image processor: Maestro II
- White balance: Yes
- Dynamic range bracketing: Yes, HDR-JPG mode

General
- Video recording: Super35 sensor format: 4k @ 24, 25fps UHD @ 24, 25, 30fps 1080p @ 24, 25, 30, 50, 60, 100, 120fps 720p @ 24, 25, 30, 50, 60, 100, 120fps Full Frame sensor format: 1080p @ 24, 25, 30, 50, 60, 100, 120fps 720p @ 24, 25, 30, 50, 60, 100, 120fps
- LCD screen: 3 inches with 1,040,000 dots
- Battery: CIPA (EVF) 400 photos
- AV port: Clean HDMI Type A out: 4k/1080/720 YCbCr 4:2:2 10bit
- Data port(s): USB 3.0 802.11b/g/n 2,4GHz X-Sync contact HDMI Type A Multi Port for Remote Control and Audio Adapter Cable
- Body features: Dust- and spraywater proof
- Dimensions: 147 × 104 × 39mm (5.79 × 4.09 × 1.54 inches)
- Weight: 847 g (30 oz) including battery
- Made in: Germany

The Leica SL (Typ 601) is a full-frame mirrorless interchangeable-lens camera announced by Leica Camera AG on 20 October 2015. The SL was promoted as a camera system for professional applications. Beside the Leica S-System, the Leica SL-System was the second professional mirrorless camera system in the company's product portfolio.

The SL (Typ 601) was succeeded by the Leica SL2 in 2019.

== EyeRes Viewfinder ==
The Leica SL (Typ 601) introduced the first EyeRes Viewfinder which was described by Leica as a combination of optical and electronic components. The resolution, angle of view and the refresh rate of the viewfinder should exceed the human eye's ability.

== Leica L-Mount ==
The Leica L-Mount is used by the Leica TL, CL and SL Systems. It was introduced by the Leica T (Typ 701) in April 2014. The L-Mount can hold lenses made for APS-C and for full frame sensor formats. The SL version of this mount is dust- and spray-water proof. Lenses of TL and SL are compatible. There are several adapters for other lens mounts and lens makers that can be used on both TL and SL camera systems. The L-Mount Alliance, announced in September 2018, opened up the system to partners Panasonic and Sigma.

=== SL lenses ===
Zoom

- Vario-Elmarit-SL 1:2.8–4 / 24–90 ASPH.
- APO-Vario-Elmarit-SL 1:2.8–4 / 90–280
- Super-Vario-Elmar-SL 1:3.5-4.5 / 16-35 ASPH.

Prime

- Summilux-SL 1:1.4 / 50 ASPH.
- APO-Summicron-SL 1:2 / 90 ASPH.
- APO-Summicron-SL 1:2 / 75 ASPH.
- APO-Summicron-SL 1:2 / 35 ASPH.
- APO-Summicron-SL 1:2 / 50 ASPH.
- APO-Summicron-SL 1:2 / 28 ASPH.
