= Doug Bandow =

American political writer (born 1957)

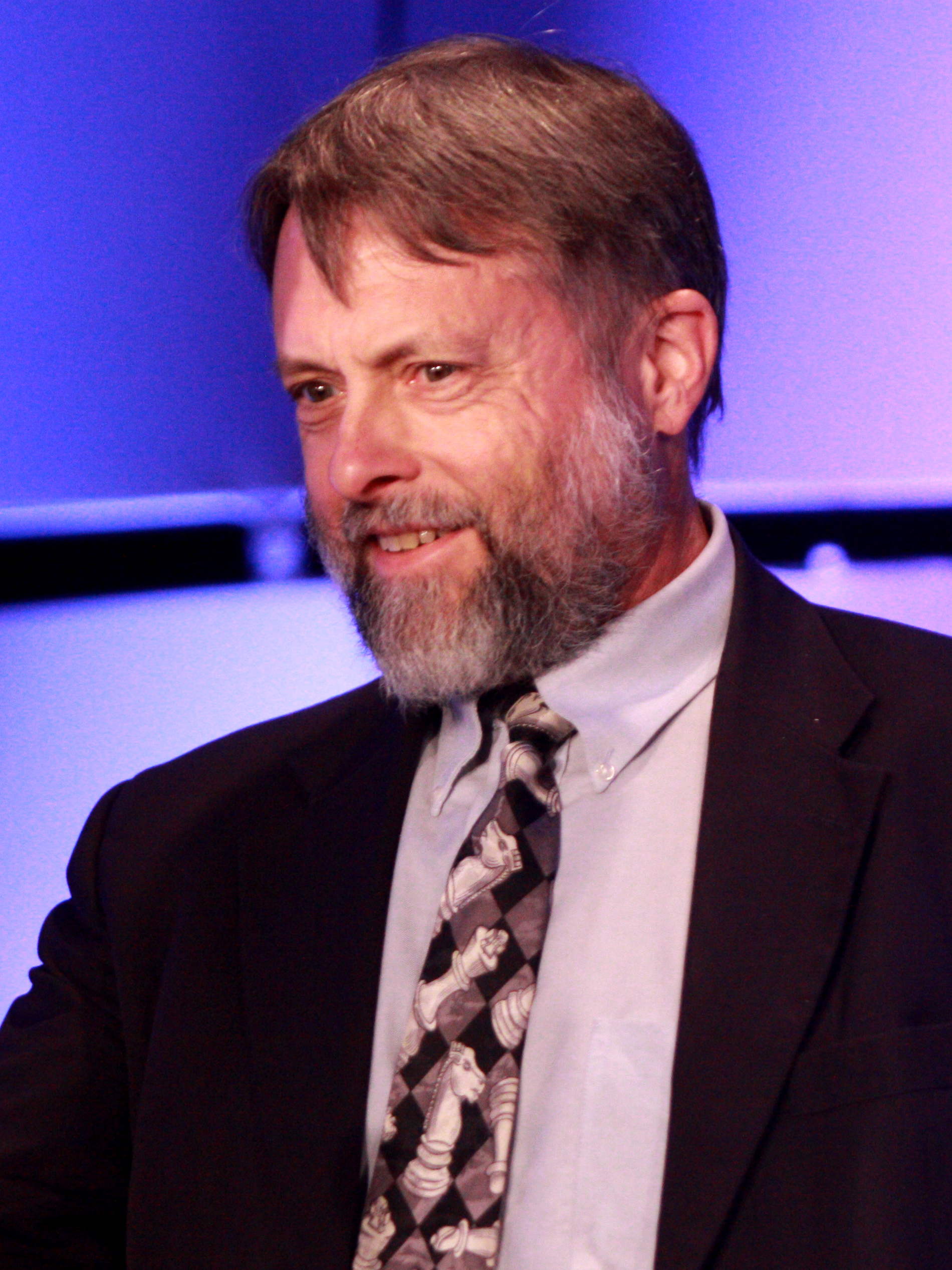
- Bandow at Liberty Political Action Conference 2013
- Born: April 15, 1957 (age 69); Washington, D.C., U.S.
- Education: Florida State University; Stanford Law School (JD)
- Occupation: Political writer

Douglas Bandow (born April 15, 1957) is an American political writer working as a Senior Fellow at the Cato Institute.

Bandow regularly writes on military non-interventionism, and is a critic of NATO enlargement.

== Background ==
Bandow obtained his bachelor's degree in economics from Florida State University in Tallahassee in 1976. He completed a J.D. degree from the Stanford Law School in Palo Alto, California in 1979. He worked in the Reagan administration as special assistant to the president and edited the political magazine Inquiry.

== Career ==
Bandow resigned from Cato in December 2005 after admitting he accepted payments from lobbyist Jack Abramoff over approximately ten years in return for publishing articles favorable to Abramoff's clients. The articles identified his affiliation with Cato, but he did not tell Cato about the payments. He has referred to these activities as "a lapse of judgment" and said that he accepted payments for "between 12 and 24 articles." Copley News Service, which had carried Bandow's syndicated column for a number of years, suspended him immediately. Bandow was later allowed to return to the Cato Institute.

In January 2006, Bandow joined the non-profit Citizen Outreach as Vice President of Policy. Bandow later rejoined the Cato Institute as a Senior Fellow, where he continues to publish through its various outlets and appear at various Cato-sponsored events.

Bandow is on the faculty of the Acton Institute for the Study of Religion and Liberty. Bandow also is the Robert A. Taft Fellow at the American Conservative Defense Alliance and the Senior Fellow in International Religious Persecution at the Institute on Religion and Public Policy. Bandow's articles have been published in periodicals like Foreign Policy, Harper's, National Interest, National Review, The New Republic, Orbis, The American Spectator, Time, Newsweek, and Fortune, as well as newspapers like The New York Times, The Wall Street Journal, and The Washington Post. Bandow's column "La Prensa: Economic Freedom and the Press," syndicated in 1988 by Copley News Service, won the 1989 Mencken Award for Best Editorial or Op-Ed Column. He previously blogged for The Huffington Post and Forbes. He is a former columnist for Antiwar.com and currently writes a weekly column for The American Conservative. He has appeared as a commentator on ABC, CBS, NBC, CNN, Fox News Channel, and MSNBC. Bandow is also a Contributing Editor to the national security publication 19FortyFive.

=== Views on Russia and Ukraine ===
Since the start of the Russian war against Ukraine, Bandow authored opinion pieces on why the U.S. should not help Ukraine against Russia. Bandow's current non-interventionist stance regarding Ukraine differs from his own position in 2003, when he questioned the favorable treatment of a hostile Russia at the expense of a friendly Ukraine: "But why not adopt a similar approach to Ukraine, the second-largest piece of the former Soviet Union, which has generally backed America? Especially since there are powerful forces pushing Kiev towards Russia's orbit." In July 2024 he signed an open letter against inviting Ukraine into NATO.

=== First Trump administration ===
Bandow characterized President Donald Trump as

Abandoning the Foreign Policy that Brought Him Victory: ...so far the Trump administration is shaping up as a disappointment for those who hoped for a break from the liberal interventionist/neoconservative synthesis. The first problem is staffing. In Washington people are policy. The president can speak and tweet, but he needs others to turn ideas into reality and implement his directives. It doesn't appear that he has any foreign policy realists around him, or anyone with a restrained view of America's international responsibilities.

== Bibliography ==
- Foreign Follies: America's New Global Empire, Xulon Press, 2006, ISBN 1-5978-1988-3
- The Korean Conundrum: America's Troubled Relations with North and South Korea (co-author with Ted Galen Carpenter), Palgrave Macmillan, 2004, ISBN 1-4039-6545-5
- Wealth, Poverty, and Human Destiny (co-author with David L. Schindler), Intercollegiate Studies Institute, 2002, ISBN 1-8829-2683-8
- Tripwire: Korea and U.S. Foreign Policy in a Changed World, Cato Institute, 1996, ISBN 1-8825-7729-9
- Perpetuating Poverty: The World Bank, the IMF, and the Developing World (co-author with Ian Vasquez), Cato Institute, 1994, ISBN 1-8825-7706-X
- The Politics of Envy: Statism as Theology, Transaction Publishers, 1994, ISBN 1-5600-0171-2
- The U.S.-South Korean Alliance: Time for a Change (co-author with Ted Galen Carpenter), Transaction Publishers, 1992, ISBN 1-5600-0018-X
- Human Resources and Defense Manpower, National Defense University Press, 1990
- The Politics of Plunder: Misgovernment in Washington, Transaction Publishers, 1990, ISBN 0-8873-8309-2
- Beyond Good Intentions: A Biblical View of Politics, Crossway, 1988, ISBN 0-8910-7498-8
