= Leica TL2 =

Overview
- Maker: Leica
- Released: 10 July 2017

Lens
- Lens mount: Leica L mount

Sensor/medium
- Sensor type: CMOS
- Sensor size: 23.6 × 15.7 mm (APS-C type)
- Maximum resolution: 6016 × 4014 (24 megapixels)
- Film speed: 100–50.000
- Recording medium: SD, SDHC, or SDXC memory card

Shutter
- Shutter speeds: 1/40.000s to 30s
- Continuous shooting: 20 frames per second

Viewfinder
- Viewfinder: Electronic
- Viewfinder magnification: 0.7
- Frame coverage: 100%

Image processing
- White balance: Yes

General
- Video recording: 720p@120, 60fps; 1080p@60fps; 3840x2160p@30fps
- LCD screen: 3.7 inches with 1,300,000 dots
- Dimensions: 134 × 69 × 33 mm (5.28 × 2.72 × 1.3 inches)
- Weight: 399 g (14 oz) including battery

The Leica TL2 is a digital mirrorless interchangeable lens camera with a Leica L-mount announced by Leica Camera on 10 July 2017.
