= Tom G. Palmer =

American writer (born 1956)

Tom Palmer
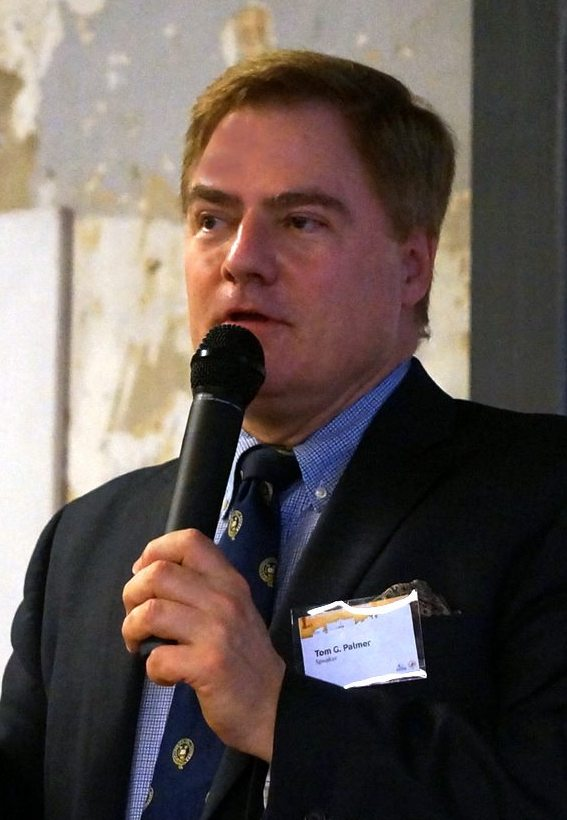
- Born: Thomas Gordon Palmer; 1956 (age 69–70); Bitburg-Mötsch, West Germany (now Germany)
- Education: St. John's College, Maryland (BA); Catholic University (MA); Hertford College, Oxford (DPhil)

Thomas Gordon Palmer (/ˈpɑːlmər/; born 1956) is an American libertarian author and theorist, a senior fellow at the Cato Institute and vice president for International Programs at the Atlas Network.

== Professional life ==
Palmer earned his B.A. in liberal arts from St. John's College, his M.A. in philosophy from The Catholic University of America, and his doctorate in political science from Oxford University. At Oxford, Palmer was an H. B. Earhart Fellow at Hertford College and the president of the Oxford Hayek Society.

Palmer has been active in the promotion of libertarian and classical liberal ideas and policies since the early 1970s. He has been editor of several publications, including Dollars & Sense (the newspaper of the National Taxpayers Union), Update, and the Humane Studies Review, and has published articles in such newspapers and magazines as The New York Times, The Washington Post, the Los Angeles Times, The Spectator of London, National Review, Slate, Ethics, and the Cato Journal.

He teaches political economy and legal and constitutional history for the Institute for Humane Studies the Institute of Economic Studies Europe. He also works with such organizations as Liberty Fund, and the Council on Public Policy, He blogs at his own website and at Cato@Liberty and is a contributor to the Independent Gay Forum. Palmer is the director of Cato University, a summer seminar sponsored by the Cato Institute.

Palmer is a senior fellow of the Cato Institute, where he was previously also Vice President for International Programs and director of its Center for the Promotion of Human Rights. He remains director of Cato University. On January 1, 2009, the center's programs were shifted to the Atlas Economic Research Foundation and the Atlas Global Initiative for Free Trade, Peace, and Prosperity. Palmer is executive vice president of the Atlas Network and general director of its Global Initiative, which has since expanded its programs. The Atlas Economic Research Foundation was founded by Antony Fisher, the moving force behind Britain's classical liberal Institute of Economic Affairs.

== Involvement in Eastern Europe ==
Before joining the Cato Institute, he was a vice president of the Institute for Humane Studies at George Mason University. During the late 1980s and the very early 1990s, he worked with the Institute for Humane Studies and other organizations to spread classical liberal/libertarian ideas in Eastern Europe. He traveled throughout the region to hold seminars and smuggled books, cash, photocopiers, and fax machines from an office in Vienna, Austria. He arranged for translation and publication into a variety of central and eastern European languages of textbooks in economics and law, as well as seminal works by Ludwig von Mises, Friedrich Hayek, Milton Friedman, and other thinkers in the libertarian and liberal traditions. He remains active in the region as a speaker at various conferences and seminars, like Liberty Seminars in Slovenia.

== Involvement in the Middle East ==
Palmer is currently attempting to duplicate in the Middle East some of the work he did in Eastern Europe. He has commissioned translation into Middle Eastern languages (Arabic, Kurdish, Persian, and Azeri) and publication of works by Frederic Bastiat, F. A. Hayek, James Madison, and other libertarian influences, and has published essays in Middle Eastern languages on such topics as "Challenges of Democratization" and "Religion and the Law." In April 2005 Palmer addressed members of the Iraqi parliament in the parliamentary assembly hall on constitutionalism and has written on Iraq. He has also promoted the creation of a libertarian web site, lampofliberty.org, where it is available in Arabic, Azerbaijani, Kurdish, and Persian; and started an Arabic publishing venture. He continues to lecture in the Middle East and works closely with Arabic and Persian bloggers. He has been actively involved in campaigning for free speech rights in the Middle East, notably with the campaign to free Abdelkareem Nabil Soliman, through articles in the Washington Post, the Daily Star of Lebanon, and other activities.

Palmer opposed the invasion of Iraq before it happened and criticized its conduct afterwards.

== Works ==
Palmer has published essays on the philosophy of individual rights (e.g., in an essay from Individual Rights Reconsidered, edited by Tibor Machan (Stanford: Hoover Institution Press, 2001), a substantive response to G. A. Cohen's attack on property rights, several responses to the theories of Cass Sunstein and Stephen Holmes, and essays on multicultural politics, on globalization, on globalization and personal and cultural identity, and on libertarian political philosophy. Palmer also published an extensive bibliographical essay on libertarianism in The Libertarian Reader, edited by David Boaz. He has published law review articles on intellectual property that have garnered substantial attention within the legal and technological community for his general critique of patents and copyrights and his suggestions of contractual and technological solutions to the problems for which intellectual property rights are usually proposed as solutions.

Palmer also currently publishes a popular blog Tom G. Palmer's Blog. In 2009, many of his essays and op-eds were published as Realizing Freedom: Libertarian Theory, History, and Practice and a 2nd expanded edition of the book was published later as well. He served as editor for The Morality of Capitalism: What Your Professors Won't Tell You, which was published in 2011 and featured essays from Nobel Prize winners Mario Vargas Llosa and Vernon L. Smith, Whole Foods Market CEO and founder John Mackey, and scholars from around the world. After the Welfare State: Politicians Stole Your Future, You Can Get It Back, published in 2012, was another book for which he served as editor and also contributed essays. Over 150,000 copies of After The Welfare State was distributed by Students for Liberty to student groups for free. In 2013, Why Liberty: Your Life, Your Choices, Your Future was published, which featured Dr. Palmer as editor and contributor. Palmer is also the editor of Peace, Love & Liberty, a book published in 2014 that features selected writings from Radley Balko, Steven Pinker, Jeffrey Miron, and others.

== Political activities ==
Palmer's political activities include being a founding member and national secretary of the Committee Against Registration and the Draft (1979–81), president of the Oxford Civil Liberties Society (1993–94), and manager or communications director for several political campaigns. He was a plaintiff in Parker v. District of Columbia, a successful lawsuit in Washington, D.C. to secure the right to own a handgun in one's home, based on the text of the Second Amendment to the U.S. Constitution. The case had particular personal significance for him, in that he once survived an attempted assault because he was armed with a handgun. Palmer believes that his attackers were motivated by anti-gay animus; he is openly gay.
