= Child labour =

Exploitation of children through work

Children aged 5 to 17 engaged in labour

Average working hours of children

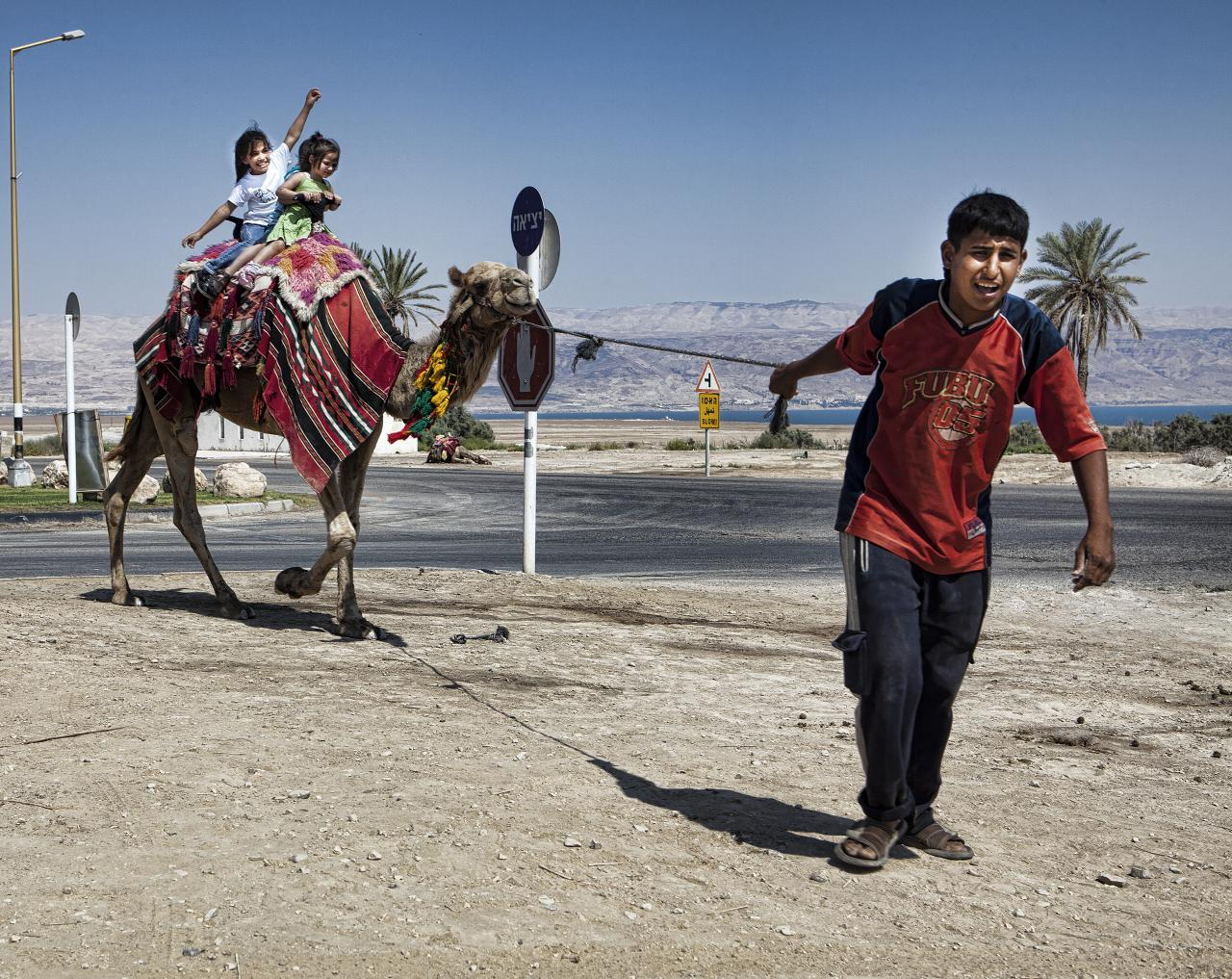
A Palestinian child labourer at the Kalya Junction, Lido beach, Delek petrol station, road 90 near the Dead Sea

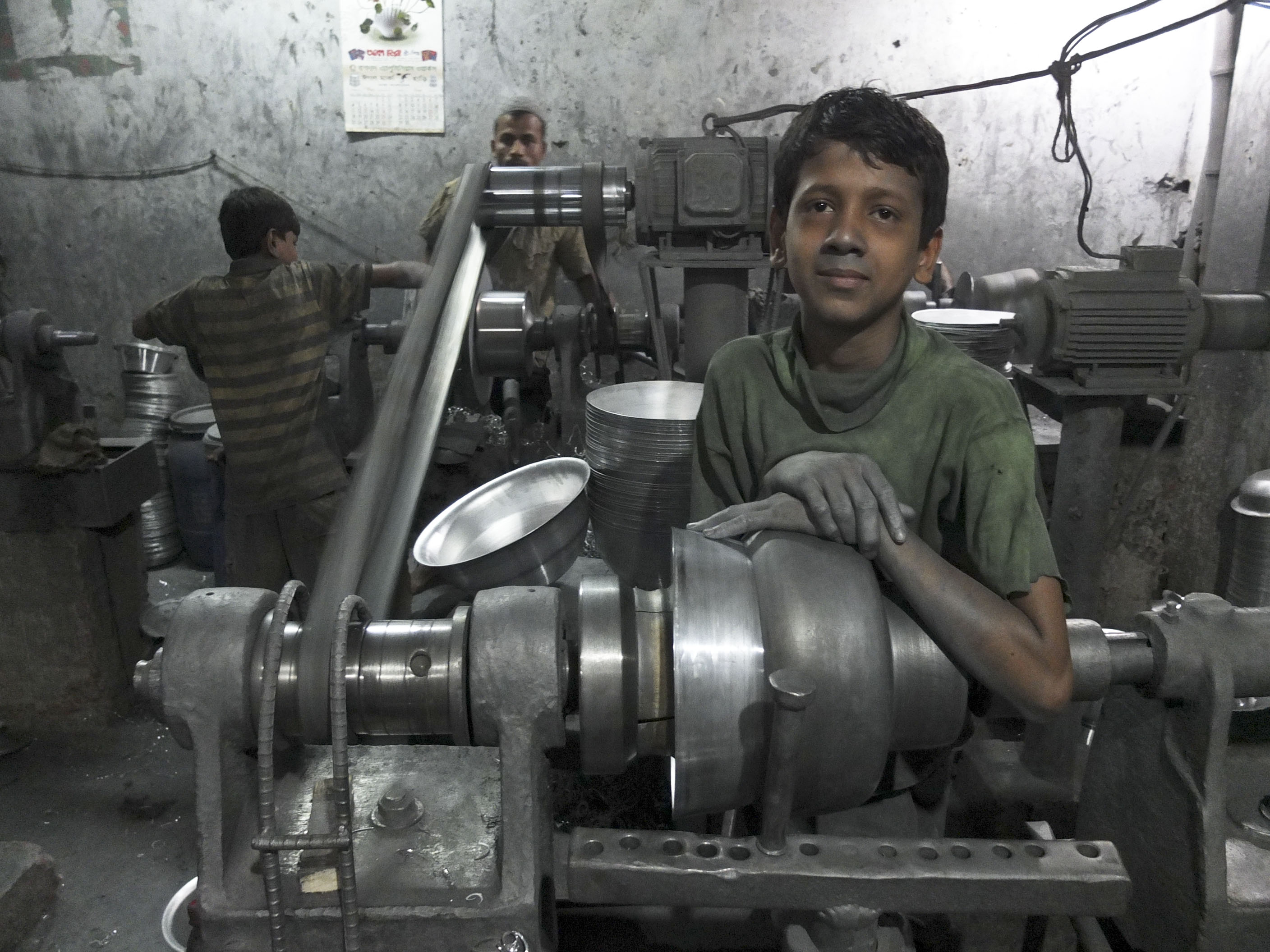
A child labourer in Dhaka, Bangladesh

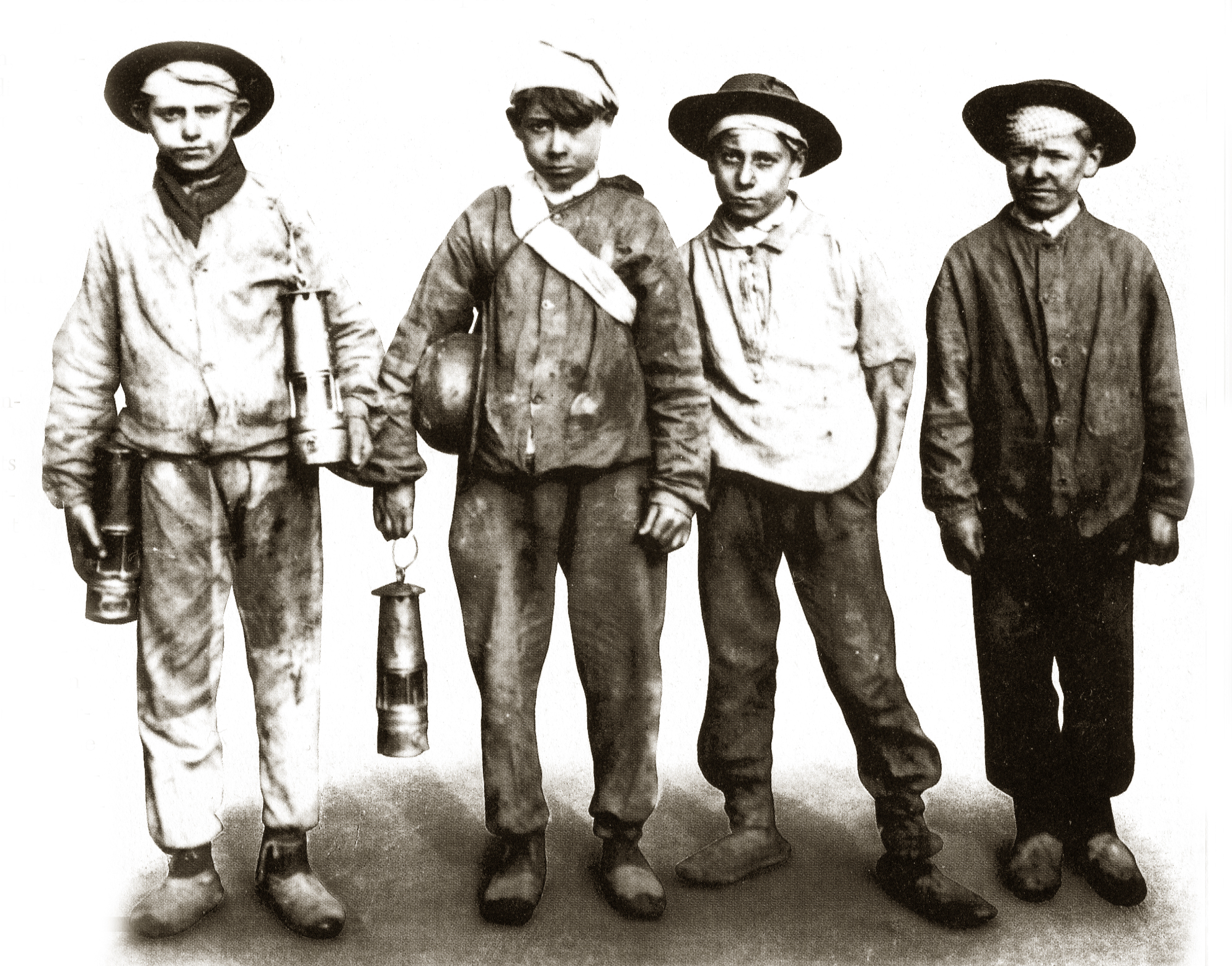
Child coal miners in Prussia, late 19th century

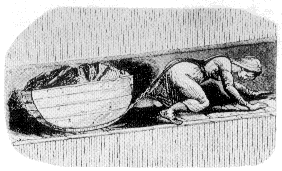
A succession of laws on child labour, the Factory Acts, were passed in the UK in the 19th century. Children younger than 9 were not allowed to work, those aged 9–16 could work 12 hours per day per the Cotton Mills Act. In 1856, the law permitted child labour past age 9, for 60 hours per week, night or day. In 1901, the permissible child labour age was raised to 12.

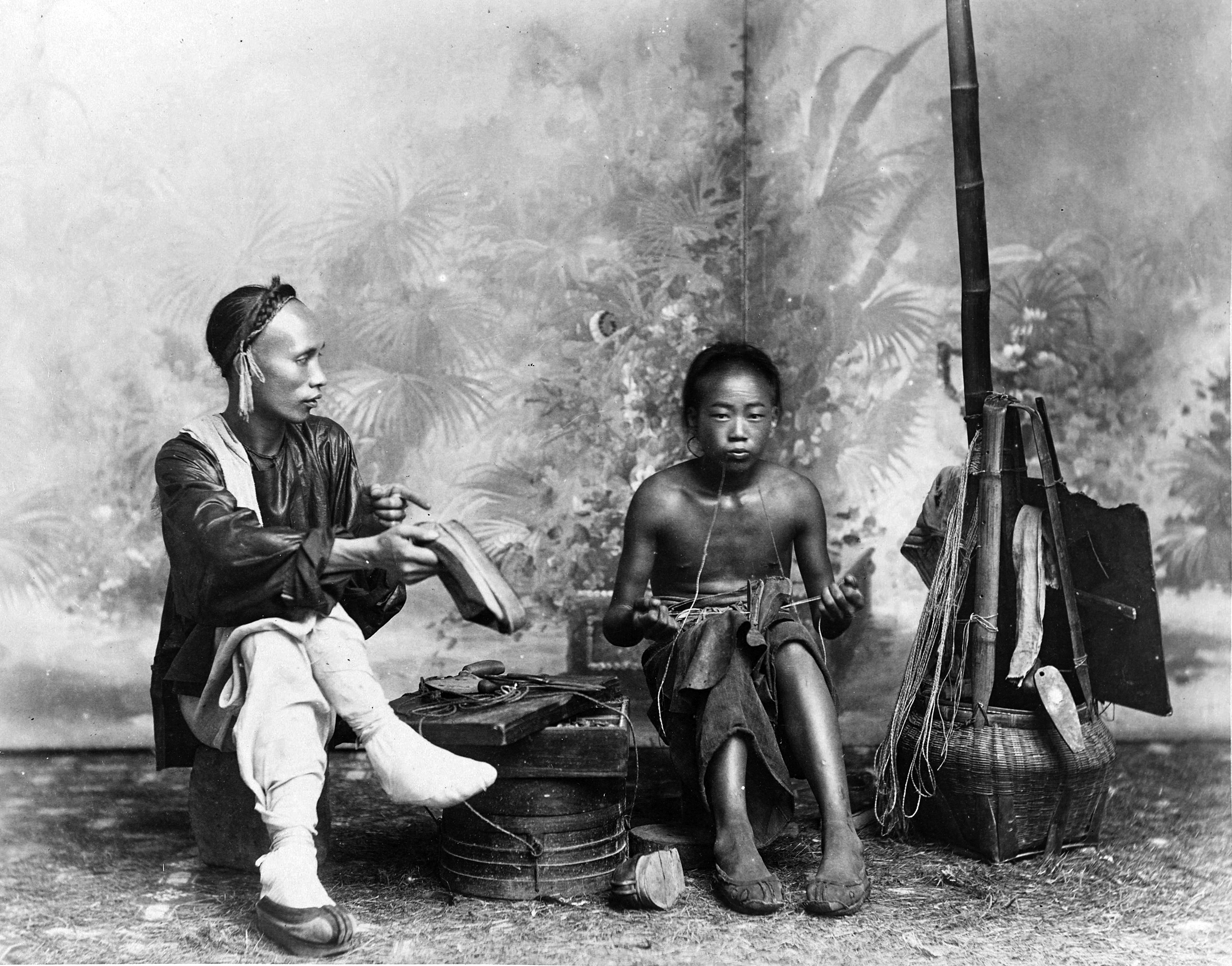
A Chinese child repairing shoes, late 19th century

Child labour is any work children engage in that interferes with their ability to attend regular school, or is mentally, physically, socially and morally harmful. Such work is prohibited by legislation worldwide, although these laws do not consider all work by children as child labour; exceptions include work by child artists, family duties, supervised training, and some forms of work undertaken by Amish children, as well as by Indigenous children in the Americas.

Child labour has existed to varying extents throughout history. During the 19th and early 20th centuries, many children aged 5–14 from poorer families worked in Western nations and their colonies alike. These children mainly worked in agriculture, home-based assembly operations, factories, mining, and services such as news boys—some worked night shifts lasting 12 hours. With the rise of household income, availability of schools and passage of child labour laws, the incidence rates of child labour fell.

As of 2023, in the world's poorest countries, around one in five children are engaged in child labour, the highest number of whom live in sub-saharan Africa, where more than one in four children are so engaged. This represents a decline in child labour over the preceding half decade. In 2017, four African nations (Mali, Benin, Chad and Guinea-Bissau) witnessed over 50 per cent of children aged 5–14 working. Worldwide, agriculture is the largest employer of child labour. The vast majority of child labour is found in rural settings and informal urban economies; children are predominantly employed by their parents, rather than factories. Poverty and lack of schools are considered the primary cause of child labour. UNICEF notes that "boys and girls are equally likely to be involved in child labour", but in different roles, girls being substantially more likely to perform unpaid household labour.

Globally the incidence of child labour decreased from 25% to 10% between 1960 and 2003, according to the World Bank. In 2024, an estimated 138 million children were in child labour, including about 54 million in hazardous work, according to the ILO and UNICEF.

== History ==
=== Preindustrial societies ===
Child labour forms an intrinsic part of pre-industrial economies. In pre-industrial societies, there is rarely a concept of childhood in the modern sense. Children often begin to actively participate in activities such as child rearing, hunting and farming as soon as they are competent. In many societies, children as young as 13 are seen as adults and engage in the same activities as adults.

The work of children was important in pre-industrial societies, as children needed to provide their labour for their survival and that of their group. Pre-industrial societies were characterised by low productivity and short life expectancy; preventing children from participating in productive work would be more harmful to their welfare and that of their group in the long run. In pre-industrial societies, there was little need for children to attend school. This is especially the case in non-literate societies. Most pre-industrial skill and knowledge were amenable to being passed down through direct mentoring or apprenticing by competent adults.

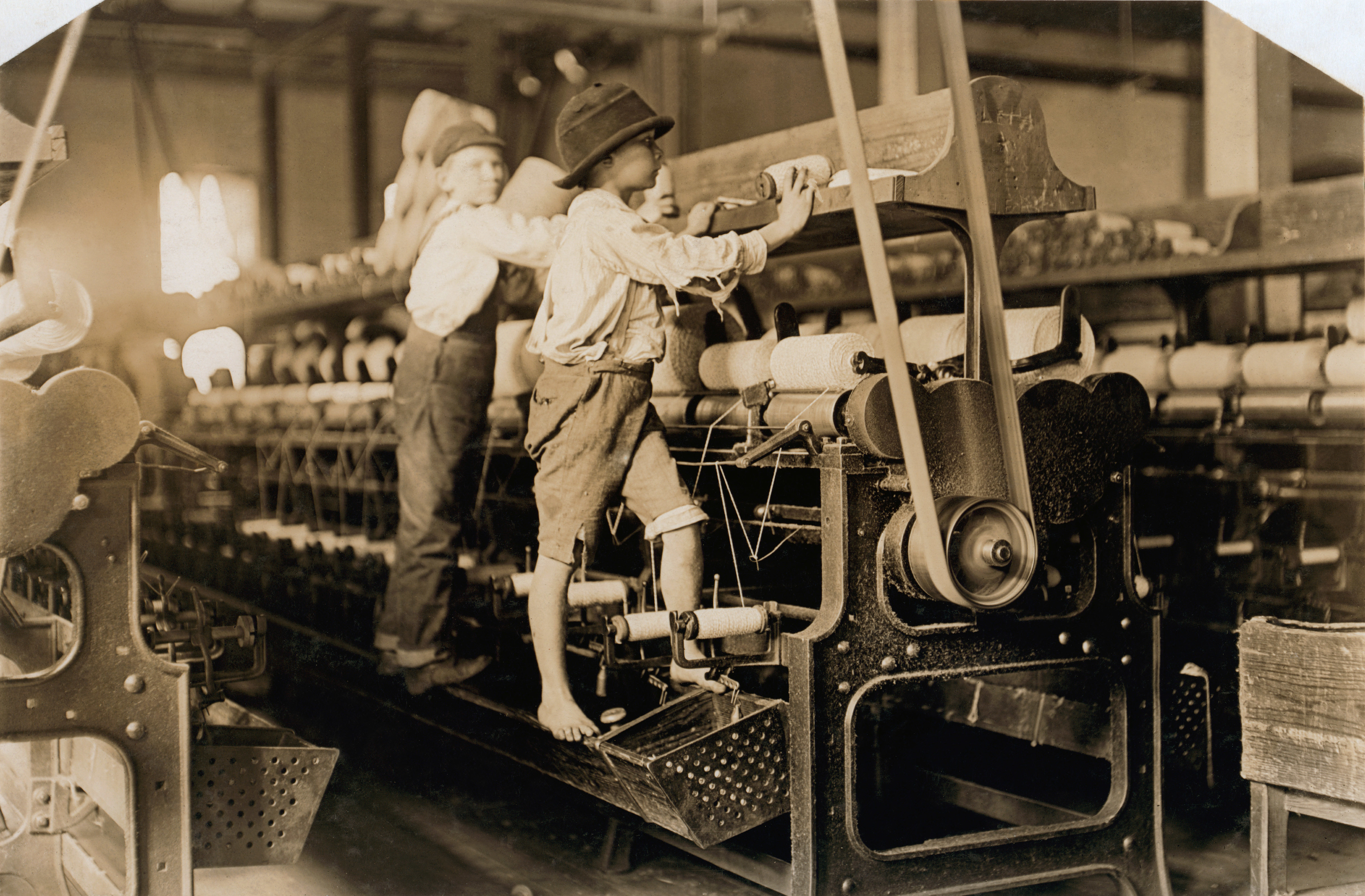
Child labourers, Macon, Georgia, 1909

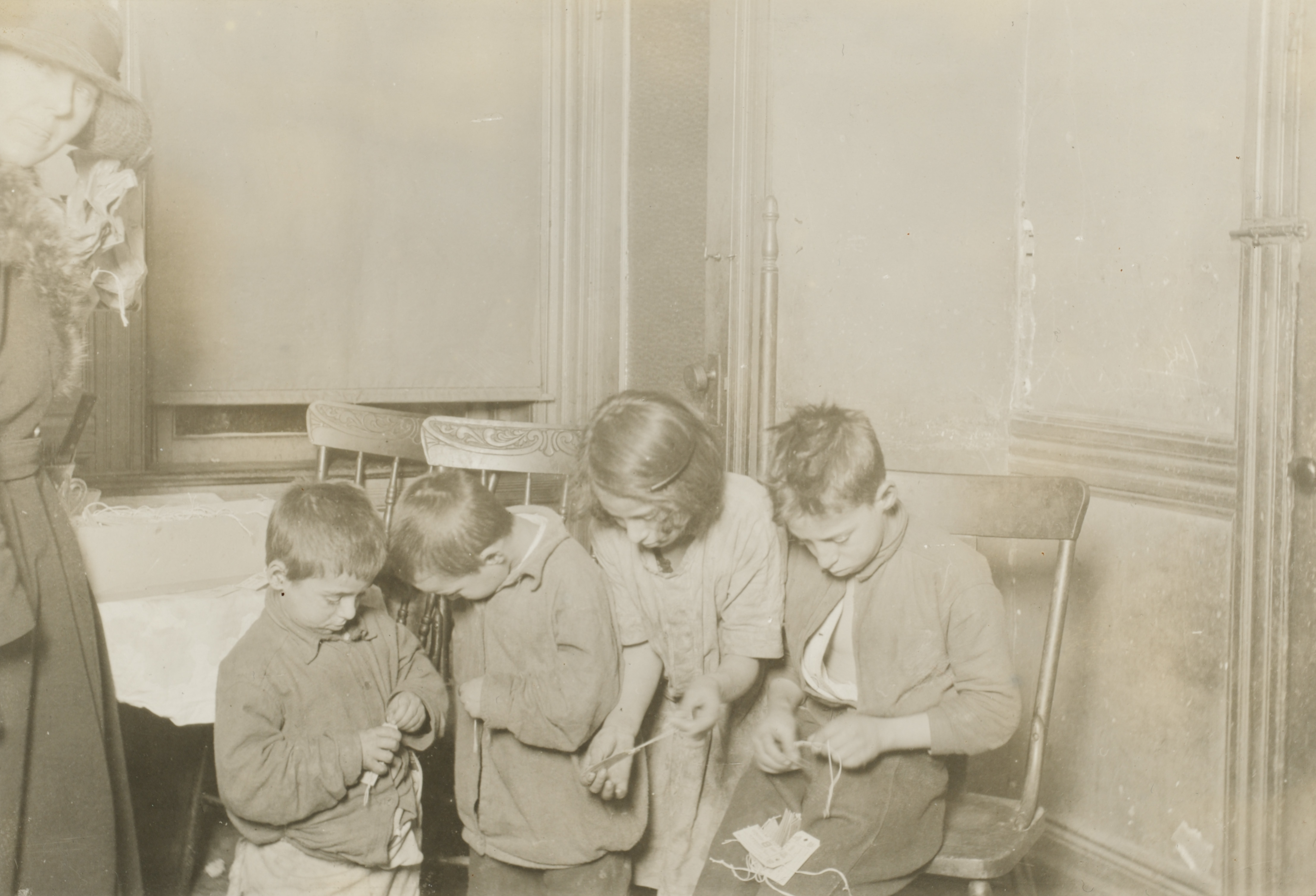
Children working in home-based assembly operations in United States (1923)

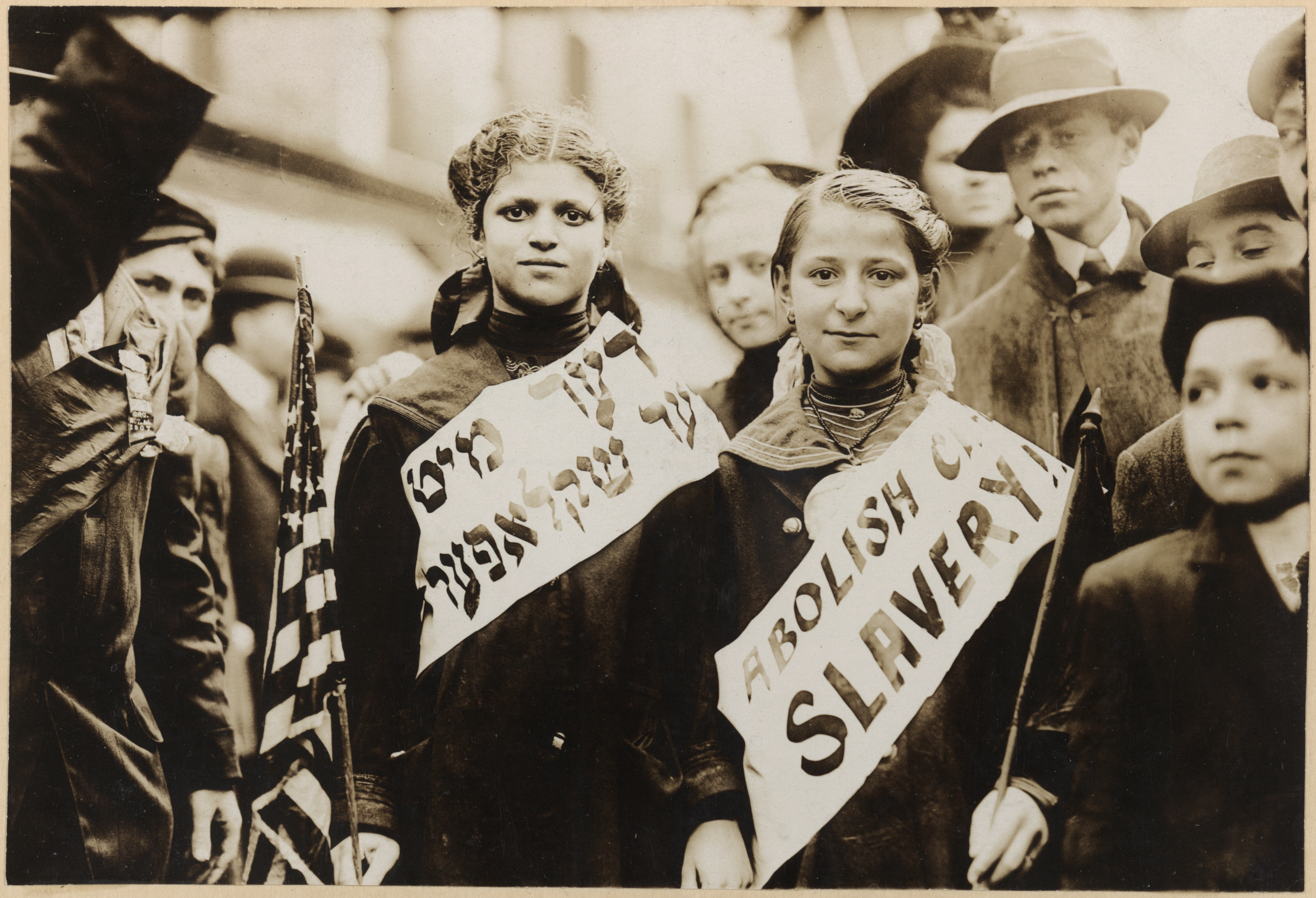
Two girls protesting child labour (by calling it child slavery) in the 1909 New York City Labor Day parade.

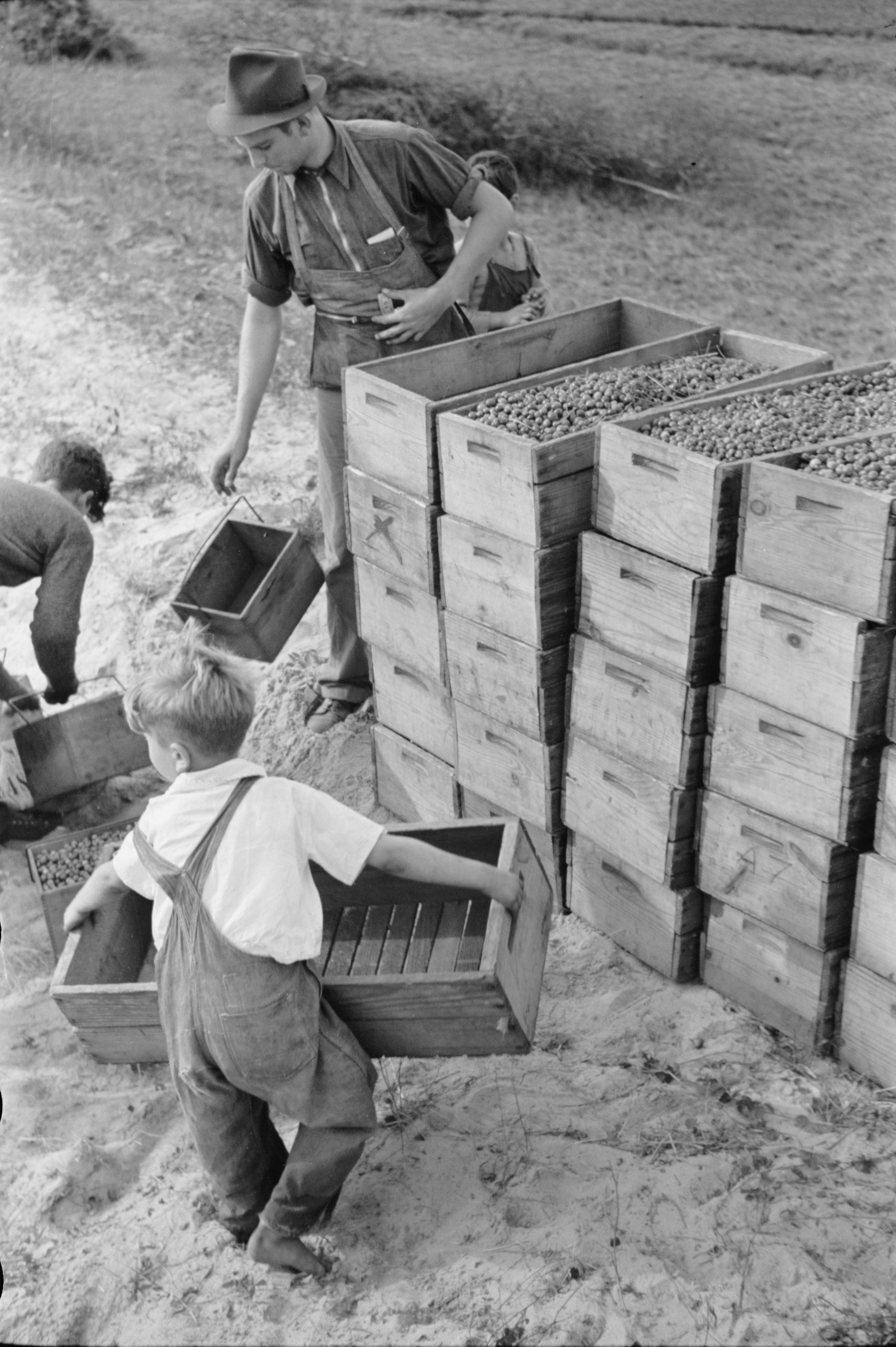
Arthur Rothstein, Child Labor, Cranberry Bog, 1939. Brooklyn Museum.

=== Industrial Revolution in Great Britain ===
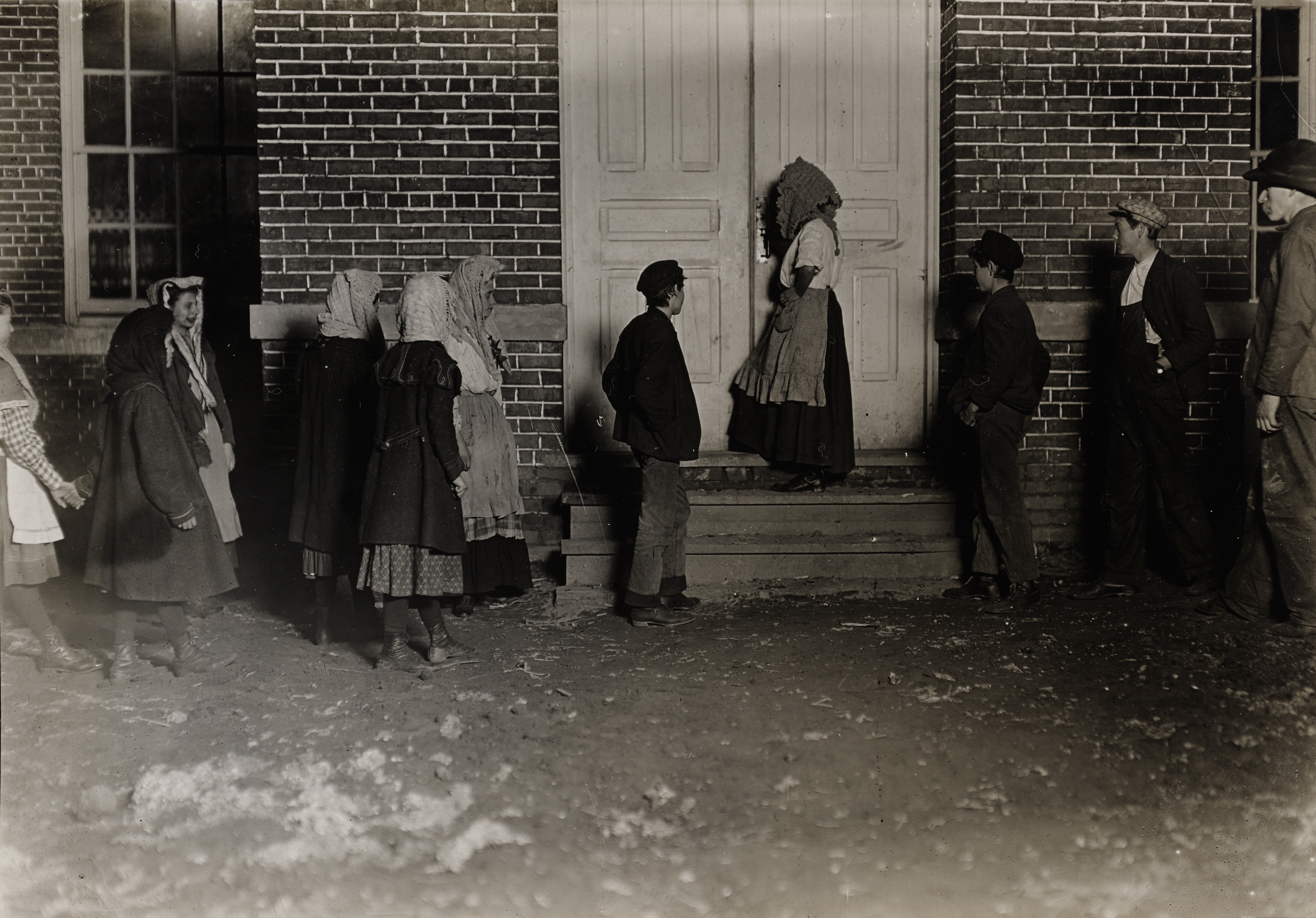
Children going to a 12-hour night shift in the United States (1908)

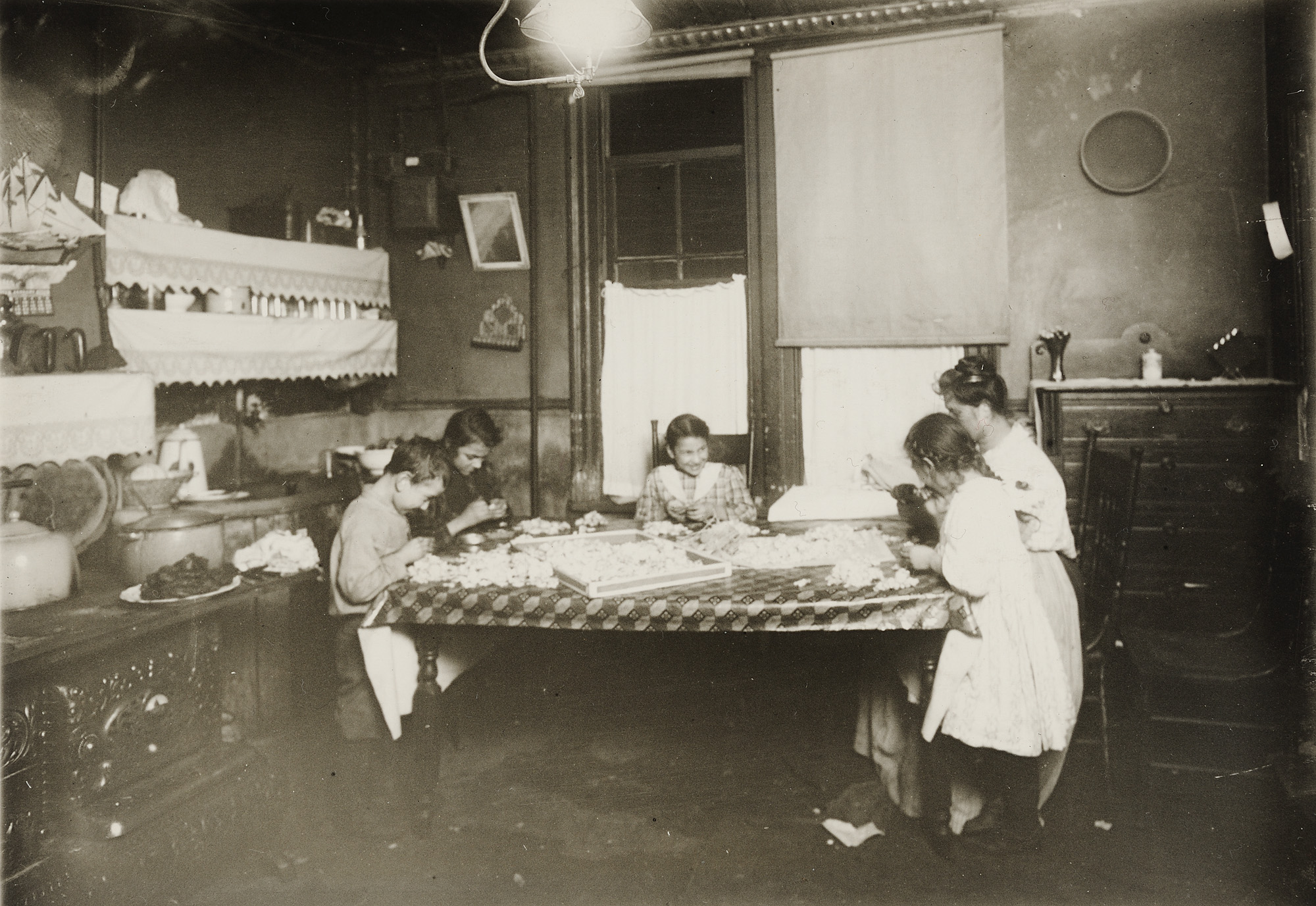
The early 20th century witnessed many home-based enterprises involving child labour. An example is shown above from New York in 1912.

With the onset of the Industrial Revolution in Britain in the late 18th century, there was a rapid increase in the industrial exploitation of labour, including child labour. Industrial cities such as Birmingham, Manchester, and Liverpool rapidly grew from small villages into large cities and improving child mortality rates. These cities drew in the population that was rapidly growing due to increased agricultural output. This process was replicated in other industrialising countries.

The Victorian era in particular became notorious for the conditions under which children were employed. Children as young as four were employed in production factories and mines in often fatal, working conditions. Boys as young as four, particularly orphans or from poor families, worked as chimney sweeps. The job was hazardous, and Percivall Pott's discovery of chimney sweeps' carcinoma, a cancer affecting chimney sweeps, was the first recognised form of occupational cancer. Working hours were long.

Child labour was brought about by economic hardship. In 19th-century Great Britain, one-third of poor families were without a breadwinner, as a result of death or abandonment, obliging many children to work from a young age. In England and Scotland in 1788, two-thirds of the workers in 143 water-powered cotton mills were described as children. A high number of children also worked as prostitutes. The author Charles Dickens was a factory worker.

Child wages were often low, the wages were as little as 10–20% of an adult male's wage. Karl Marx was an outspoken opponent of child labour, saying British industries "could but live by sucking blood, and children's blood too", and that U.S. capital was financed by the "capitalized blood of children". Letitia Elizabeth Landon castigated child labour in her 1835 poem "The Factory", portions of which she pointedly included in her 18th Birthday Tribute to Princess Victoria in 1837.

Throughout the second half of the 19th century, child labour began to decline in industrialised societies due to regulation and economic factors because of the growth of trade unions. The regulation of child labour began from the earliest days of the Industrial Revolution. The first act to regulate child labour in Britain was passed in 1803. Factory Acts were created. Multiple chimney sweepers' acts were passed to limit the age of chimney sweeps. Lord Shaftesbury was an outspoken advocate of regulating child labour.

As technology improved and proliferated, there was a greater need for educated employees. This saw an increase in schooling, with the eventual introduction of compulsory schooling. Improved technology, automation and further legislation significantly reduced child labour particularly in western Europe and the U.S.

According to Colin Heywood, reform oriented historians on the left developed an interpretation of child labour in the industrial West along these lines:

It begins with the dragooning of large numbers of young people into textile mills, mines, and factories spawned by early industrialization, with new machinery making it possible to substitute women and children for adult male workers. Conditions in the workshops were grim, with the familiar tale of long hours to match the relentless pace of the machines, a damp and dusty environment, and a heartless disciplinary regime. . . . A disparate group of reformers stepped forward at this point, to combat abuses with legislation, including hardheaded businessmen interested in maximizing profits, more philanthropically minded representatives of the landed gentry and professional classes, and, in the American case, leaders of organized labor. Gradually, by a process of trial and error, the state managed to curb some of the excesses of child labor, notably excluding younger age-groups from workshops, overcoming opposition from many industrialists and working-class parents in the process. Child labor thereby emerges as at its most abusive during the early, or “dirty,” phase of industrialization, and gradually disappears in developed economies as the state manages to force children out of the workshops and into schools.

=== Early 20th century ===
Percentage children working in England and Wales
Census year	% boys aged 10–14 as child labour
1881	22.9
1891	26.0
1901	21.9
1911	18.3
Note: These are averages; child labour in Lancashire was 80%
Source: Census of England and Wales

In the early 20th century, thousands of boys were employed in glass making industries. Glass making was a dangerous and tough job especially without the current technologies. The process of making glass includes intense heat to melt glass (3,133 °F (1,723 °C)). Boys working in glassworks were exposed to high temperatures, leading to eye trouble, lung ailments, heat exhaustion, cuts, and burns. Since workers were paid by the piece, they had to work productively for hours without a break. Since furnaces had to be constantly burning, there were night shifts from 5:00 pm to 3:00 am. Many factory owners preferred boys under 16 years of age.

An estimated 1.7 million children under the age of fifteen were employed in American industry by 1900.

In 1910, over 2 million children in the same age group were employed in the United States. This included children who rolled cigarettes, engaged in factory work, worked as bobbin doffers in textile mills, worked in coal mines and were employed in canneries. Lewis Hine's photographs of child labourers in the 1910s powerfully evoked the plight of working children in the American south. Hine took these photographs between 1908 and 1917 as the staff photographer for the National Child Labor Committee.

==== Household enterprises ====
Factories and mines were not the only places where child labour was prevalent in the early 20th century. Home-based manufacturing across the United States and Europe employed children as well. Governments and reformers argued that labour in factories must be regulated and the state had an obligation to provide welfare for poor. Legislation that followed had the effect of moving work out of factories into urban homes. Families and women, in particular, preferred it because it allowed them to generate income while taking care of household duties.

Home-based manufacturing operations were active year-round. Families willingly deployed their children in these income generating home enterprises. In many cases, men worked from home. In France, over 58% of garment workers operated out of their homes; in Germany, the number of full-time home operations nearly doubled between 1882 and 1907; and in the United States, millions of families operated out of home seven days a week, year round to produce garments, shoes, artificial flowers, feathers, match boxes, toys, umbrellas and other products. Children aged 5–14 worked alongside the parents. Home-based operations and child labour in Australia, Britain, Austria and other parts of the world was common. Rural areas similarly saw families deploying their children in agriculture. In 1946, Frieda S. Miller – then Director of the United States Department of Labor – told the International Labour Organization (ILO) that these home-based operations offered "low wages, long hours, child labour, unhealthy and insanitary working conditions".

=== 21st century ===
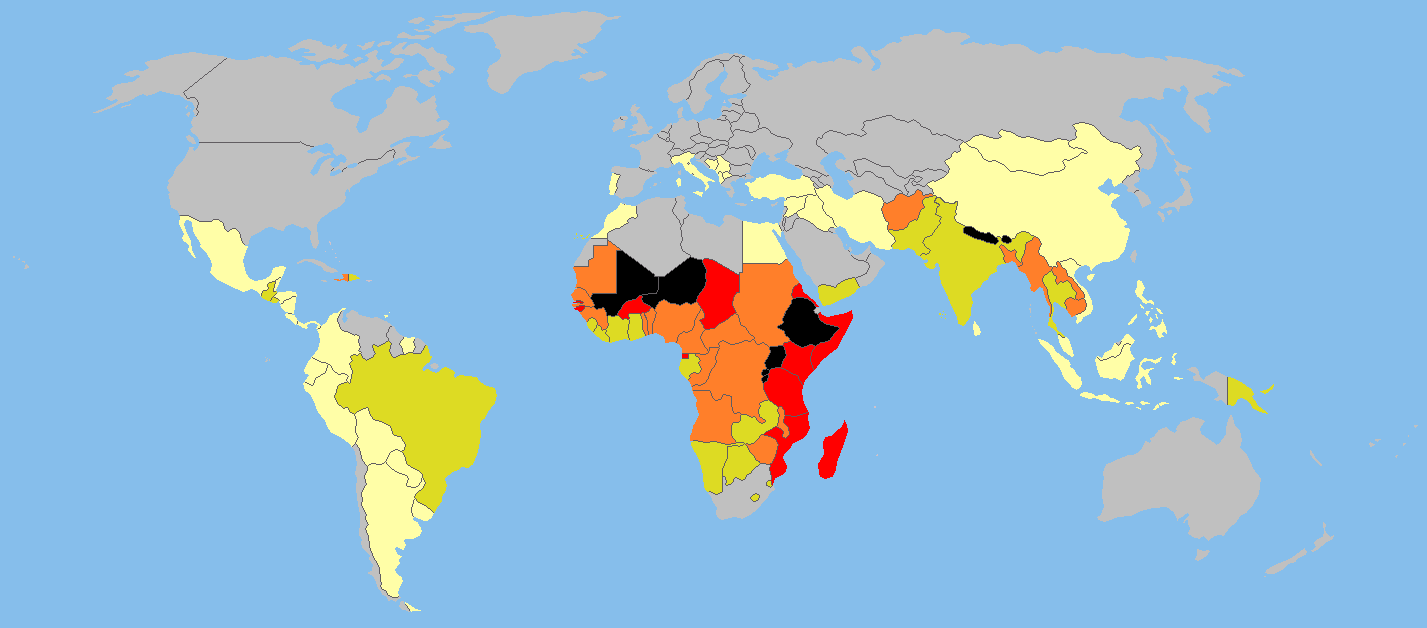
Map for child labour worldwide in the 10–14 age group, in 2003, per World Bank data. No data 0.01 to 10% children at work 10 to 20% children at work 20 to 30% children at work 30 to 40% children at work More than 40% children at work The data is incomplete, as many countries do not collect or report child labour data. Some nations such as Guinea-Bissau, Mali and Ethiopia have more than half of all children aged 5–14 at work to help provide for their families.

Child labour is still common in many parts of the world. Estimates for child labour vary. It ranges between 250 and 304 million, if children aged 5–17 involved in any economic activity are counted. If light occasional work is excluded, ILO estimates there were 153 million child labourers aged 5–14 worldwide in 2008. This is about 20 million less than ILO estimate for child labourers in 2004. Some 60 per cent of the child labour was involved in agricultural activities such as farming, dairy, fisheries and forestry. Another 25% of child labourers were in service activities such as retail, hawking goods, restaurants, load and transfer of goods, storage, picking and recycling trash, polishing shoes, domestic help, and other services. The remaining 15% laboured in assembly and manufacturing in informal economy, home-based enterprises, factories, mines, packaging salt, operating machinery, and such operations. Two out of three child workers work alongside their parents, in unpaid family work situations. Some children work as guides for tourists, sometimes combined with bringing in business for shops and restaurants. Child labour predominantly occurs in the rural areas (70%) and informal urban sector (26%).

Contrary to popular belief, most child labourers are employed by their parents rather than in manufacturing or formal economy. Children who work for pay or in-kind compensation are usually found in rural settings as opposed to urban centres. Less than 3% of child labourers aged 5–14 across the world work outside their household, or away from their parents.

Child labour accounts for 22% of the workforce in Asia, 32% in Africa, 17% in Latin America, 1% in the US, Canada, Europe and other wealthy nations. The proportion of child labourers varies greatly among countries and even regions inside those countries. Africa has the highest percentage of children aged 5–17 employed as child labour, and a total of over 65 million. Asia, with its larger population, has the largest number of children employed as child labour at about 114 million. Latin America and the Caribbean region have lower overall population density, but at 14 million child labourers has high incidence rates too.

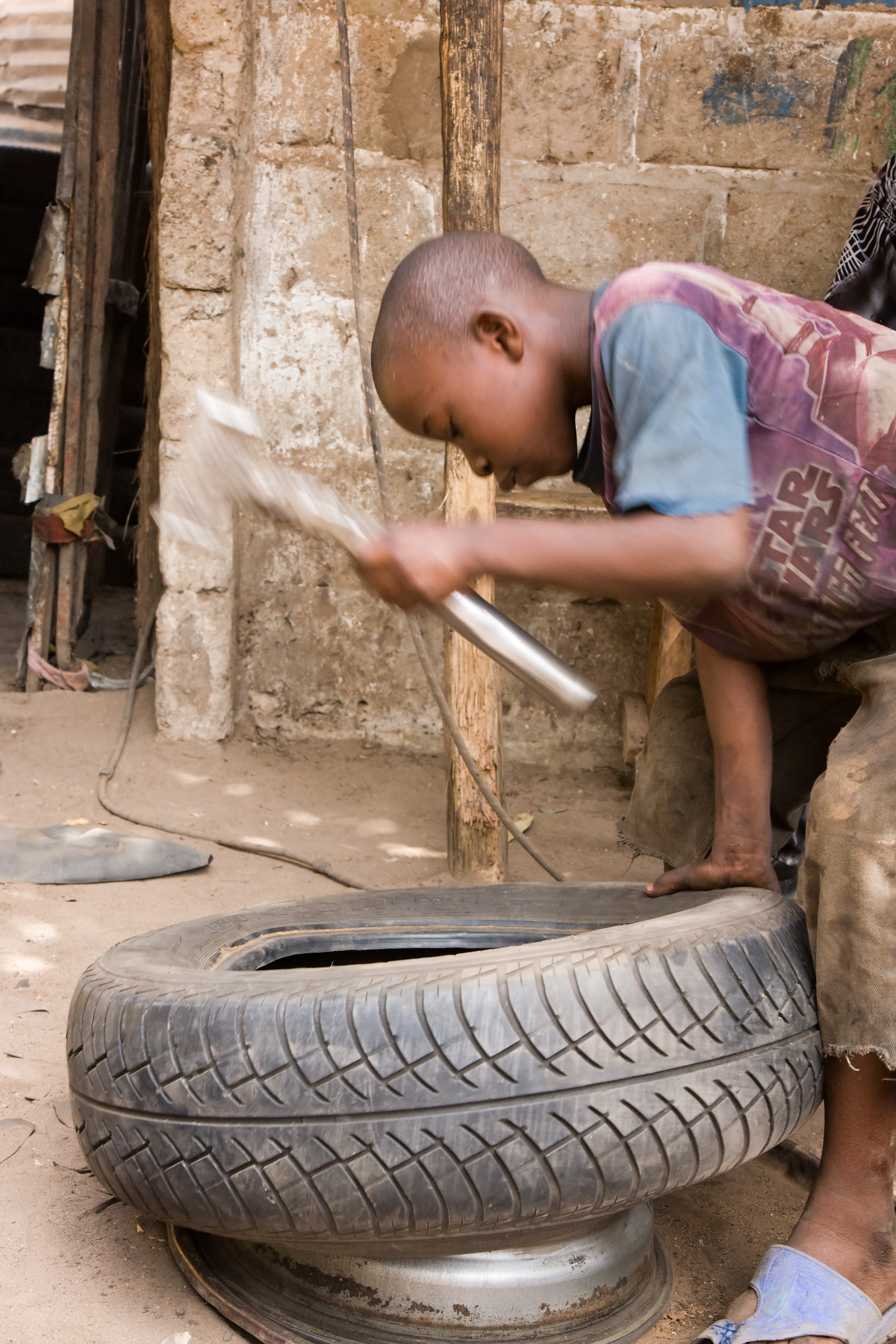
A boy repairing a tire in Gambia

Accurate present-day child labour information is difficult to obtain because of disagreements between data sources as to what constitutes child labour. In some countries, government policy contributes to this difficulty. For example, the overall extent of child labour in China is unclear due to the government categorising child labour data as "highly secret". China has enacted regulations to prevent child labour; still, the practice of child labour is reported to be a persistent problem within China, generally in agriculture and low-skill service sectors as well as small workshops and manufacturing enterprises.

In 2014, the U.S. Department of Labor issued a List of Goods Produced by Child Labor or Forced Labor, where China was attributed 12 goods, the majority of which were produced by both underage children and indentured labourers. The report listed electronics, garments, toys, and coal, among other goods.

The Maplecroft Child Labour Index 2012 survey reports that 76 countries pose extreme child labour complicity risks for companies operating worldwide. The ten highest risk countries in 2012, ranked in decreasing order, were: Myanmar, North Korea, Somalia, Sudan, DR Congo, Zimbabwe, Afghanistan, Burundi, Pakistan and Ethiopia. Of the major growth economies, Maplecroft ranked Philippines 25th riskiest, India 27th, China 36th, Vietnam 37th, Indonesia 46th, and Brazil 54th, all of them rated to involve extreme risks of child labour uncertainties, to corporations seeking to invest in developing world and import products from emerging markets.

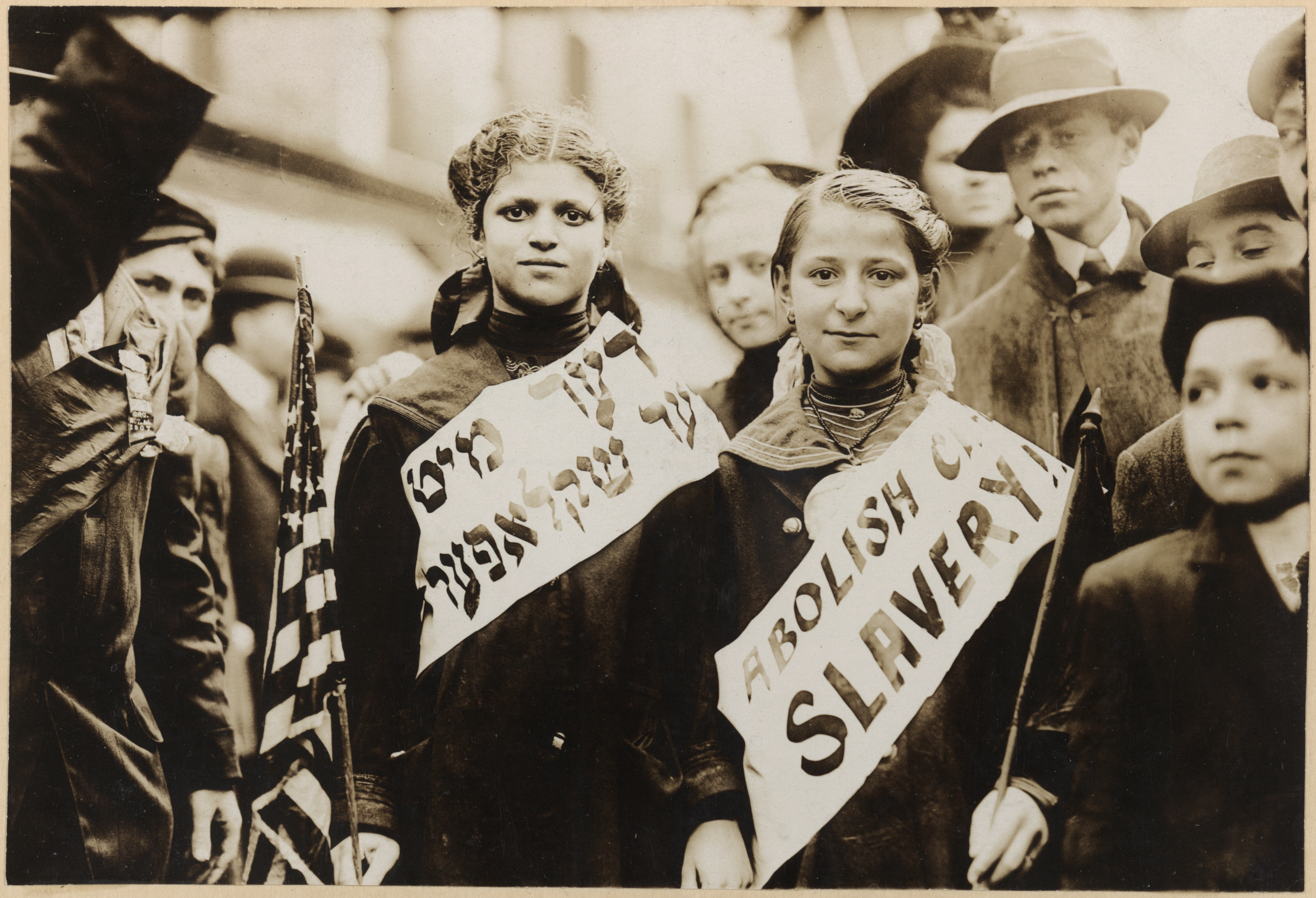
Two girls carrying banners with the slogan "ABOLISH CHILD SLAVERY!" in English and Yiddish. Photo likely taken during the May Day Labor Parade in 1909 in New York City.

== Eradication of child labour ==
The eradication of child labour is an urgent and important priority for the International Labour Organization (ILO), since for centuries child labour was accepted and legal, while currently this and other priorities are part of the Declaration of the Rights of the Child.

== Causes ==
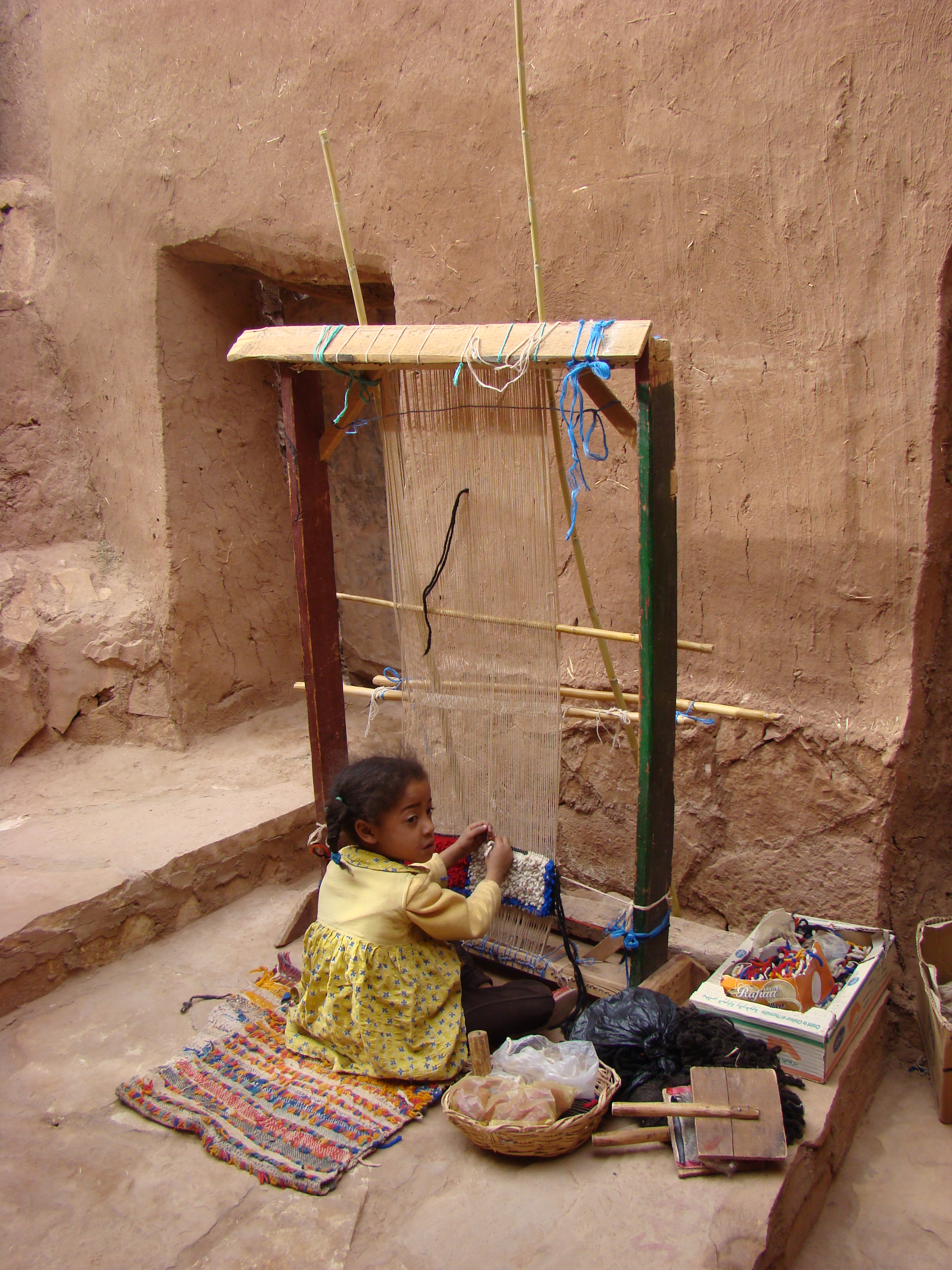
Young girl working on a loom in Aït Benhaddou, Morocco, in May 2008

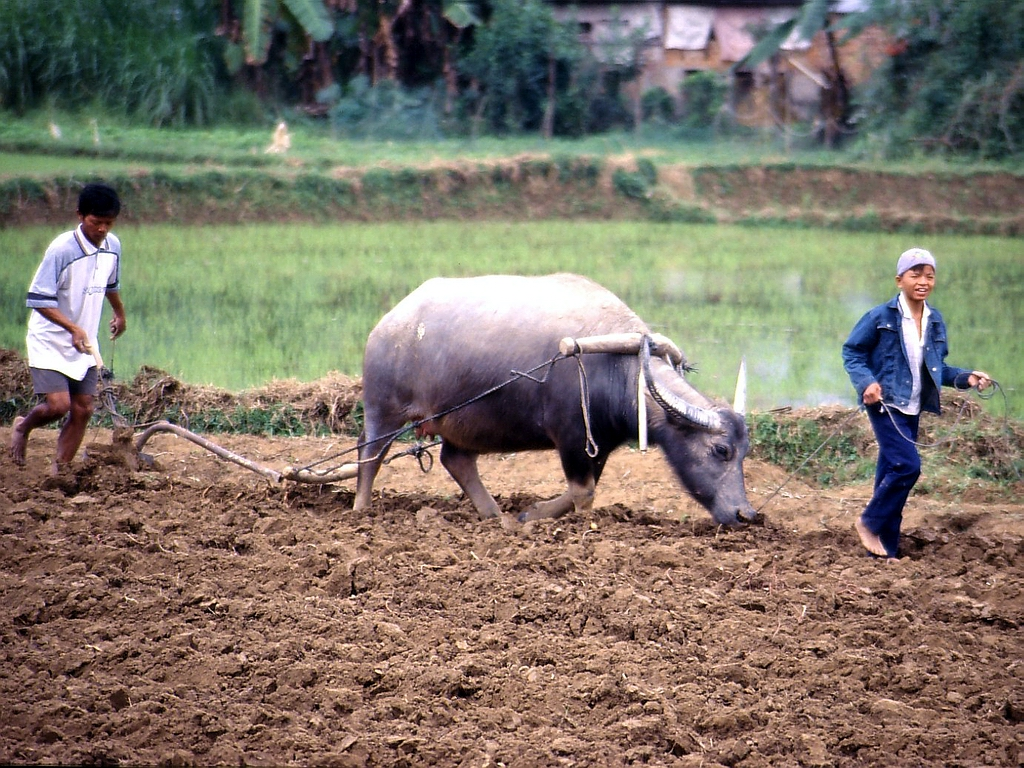
Agriculture deploys 70% of the world's child labour. Above, child worker on a rice farm in Vietnam.

The ILO suggests that poverty is the greatest single cause behind child labour. For impoverished households, income from a child's work is usually crucial for his or her own survival or for that of the household. Income from working children, even if small, may be between 25 and 40% of the household income. Other scholars such as Harsch on African child labour, and Edmonds and Pavcnik on global child labour, have reached the same conclusion.

While poverty is a significant factor, the relationship between poverty and child labour is complex. Research suggests that child labour generally decreases as household productive wealth (measured by agricultural per capita land holding in rural areas) increases. However, there can be a notable spike in the relationship between child labour and landholding at moderate levels of land per capita.

According to the ILO, lack of meaningful alternatives such as affordable schools and quality education is another major factor driving children to harmful labour in some countries. Children work because they have nothing better to do. Many communities, particularly in rural areas where child labour rates can be between 60 and 70 per cent, do not have access to adequate school facilities. Even when schools are available, they may be too far away, difficult to reach, unaffordable or the quality of education so poor that parents may not consider school attendance to be worth it.

=== Cultural factors ===
Historically when child labour was more common, as well as in contemporary child labour, certain cultural beliefs have grounded it. Some view that work is good for the character-building and skill development of children. In many cultures, particularly where the informal economy and small household businesses thrive, the cultural tradition is that children follow in their parents' footsteps; child labour then is a means to learn and practise that trade from a very early age. Similarly, in many cultures the education of girls is less valued or girls are simply not expected to need formal schooling, and may be pushed into child labour such as providing domestic services.

=== Macroeconomics ===
Biggeri and Mehrotra have studied the macroeconomic factors that encourage child labour. They focus their studies on India, Pakistan, Indonesia, Thailand and the Philippines. They suggest that child labour is a serious problem in all five, but it is not a new problem. Macroeconomic causes encouraged widespread child labour across the world over most of human history. They suggest that the causes for child labour include both the demand and the supply side. While poverty and unavailability of good schools explain the child labour supply side, they suggest that the growth of a low-paying informal economy rather than higher-paying formal economy is amongst the causes on the demand side. Other scholars also suggest that inflexible labour market, size of informal economy, inability of industries to scale up and lack of modern manufacturing technologies are major macroeconomic factors affecting demand for and acceptability of child labour.

== By country ==
Incidence of child labour

Share of working children who work only

Working children out of school vs hours worked by children

=== Colonial empires ===
Systematic use of child labour was commonplace in the colonies of European powers between 1650 and 1950. In Africa, colonial administrators encouraged traditional kin-ordered modes of production; that is, hiring a whole household for work, not just the adults. Millions of children worked in colonial agricultural plantations, mines and domestic service industries. Sophisticated schemes were promulgated where children in these colonies between the ages of 5 and 14 were hired as apprentices without pay in exchange for learning a craft. A system of Pauper Apprenticeships came into practice in the 19th century where the colonial master neither needed the native parents' nor child's approval to assign a child to labour away from parents at a distant farm owned by a different colonial master. Other schemes included 'earn-and-learn' programs where children would work and thereby learn. Britain for example passed a law, the Master and Servant Act 1889 (52 & 53 Vict. c. 24), followed by Tax and Pass Law, to encourage child labour in colonies. particularly in Africa. These laws offered the native men the legal ownership to some of the native land in exchange for making labour of wife and children available to the colonial government's needs such as in farms and as picannins.

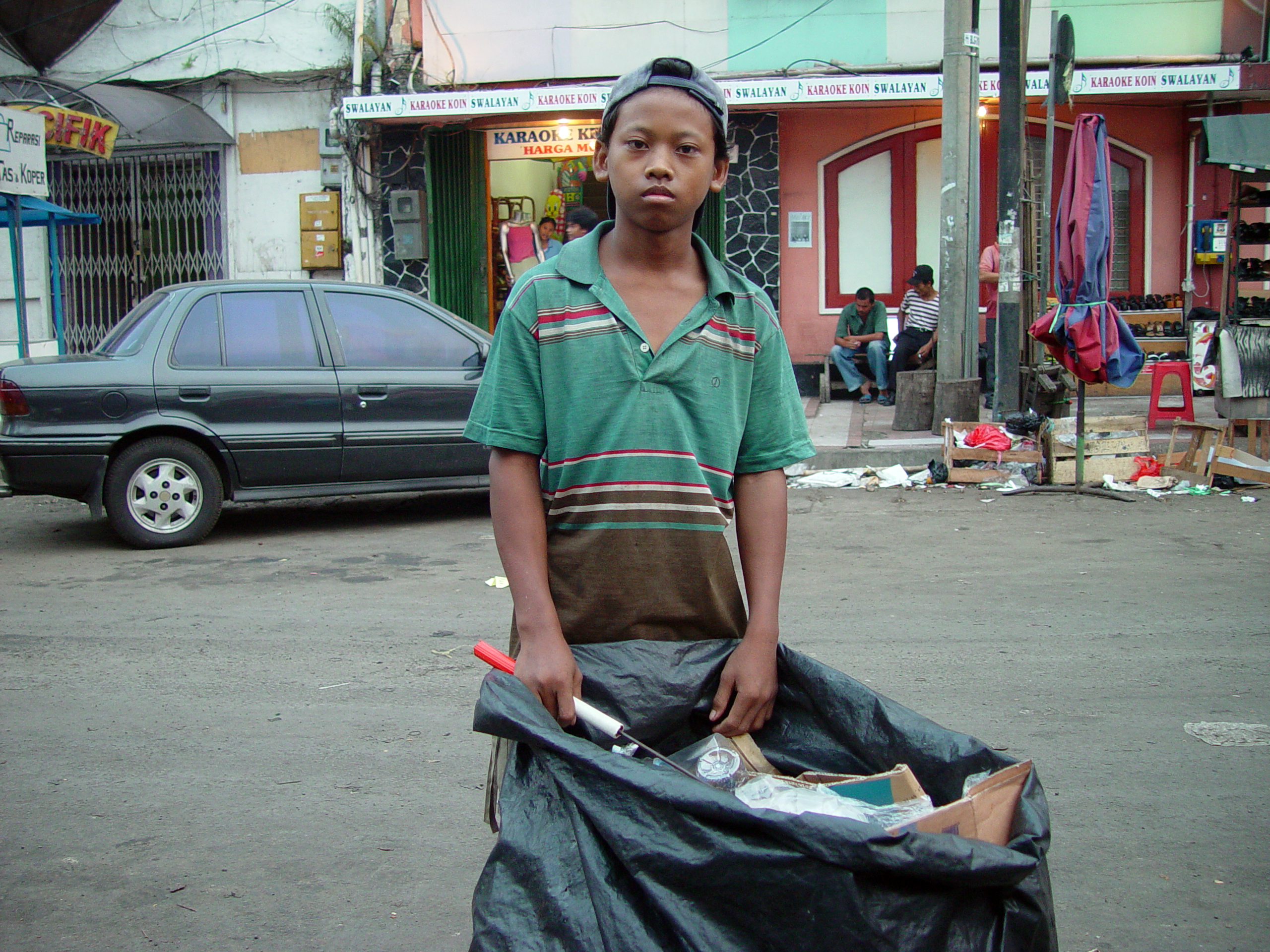
Child picking up trash in Jakarta, Indonesia.

Beyond laws, new taxes were imposed on colonies. One of these taxes was the Head Tax in the British and French colonial empires, imposed on everyone older than 8 years in some colonies. To pay these taxes and cover living expenses, children in colonial households had to work.

In southeast Asian colonies such as Hong Kong, child labour such as the Mui tsai (妹仔) was rationalised as a cultural tradition and ignored by British authorities. The Dutch East India Company officials rationalised child labour as a way to "save children from a worse fate". Christian mission schools in regions stretching from Zambia to Nigeria also required work from children, and in exchange provided religious education, not secular education. Elsewhere, the Canadian Dominion Statutes in form of so-called Breaches of Contract Act, stipulated jail terms for uncooperative child workers.

Proposals to regulate child labour began as early as 1786.

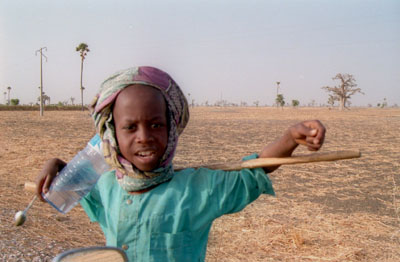
Young shepherd in Senegal.

=== Africa ===
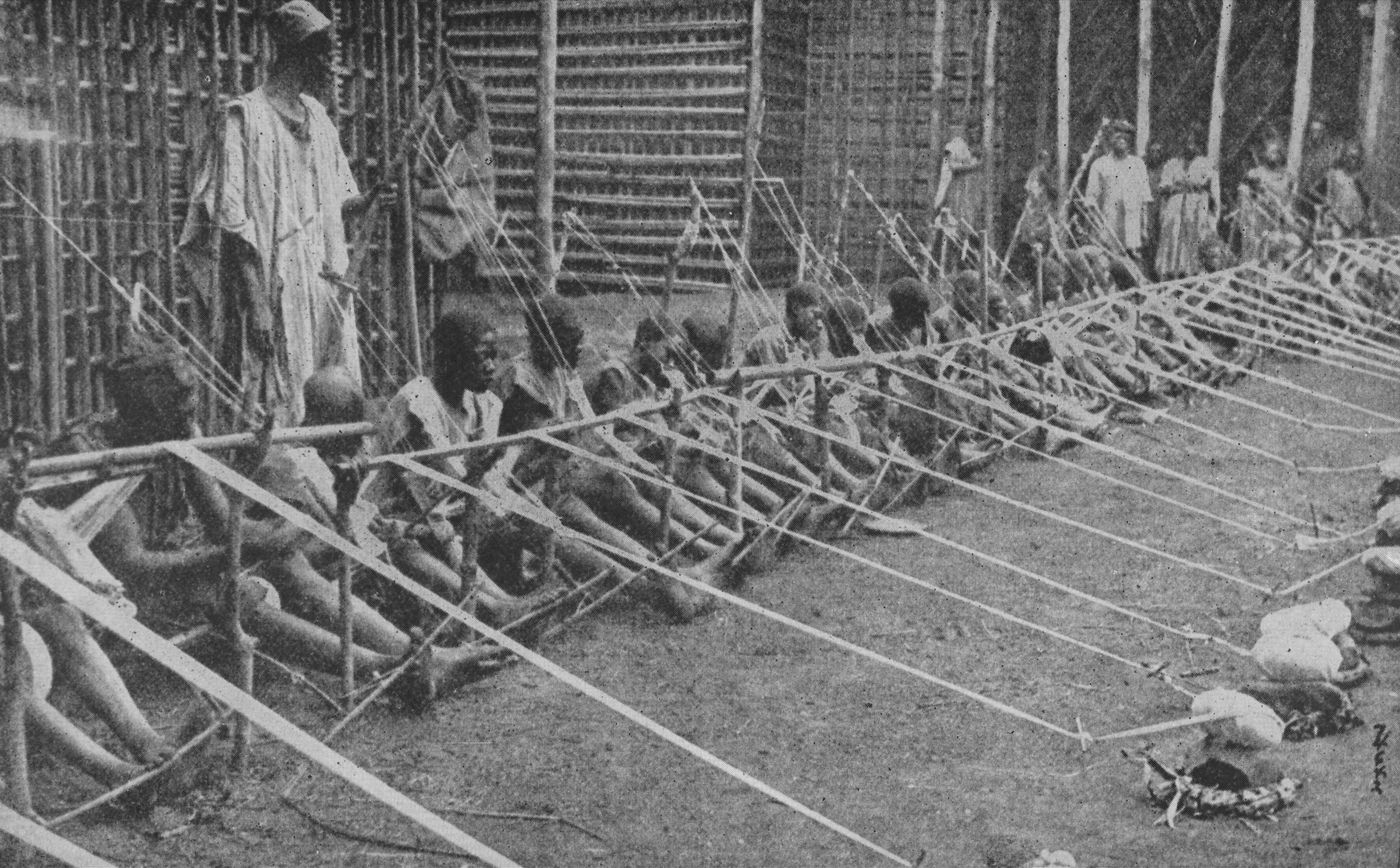
Child labour in the former German colony of Kamerun, 1919

Children working at a young age has been a consistent theme throughout Africa. Many children began first working in the home to help their parents run the family farm. Children in Africa today are often forced into exploitative labour due to family debt and other financial factors, leading to ongoing poverty. Other types of domestic child labour include working in commercial plantations, begging, and other sales such as boot shining. In total, there is an estimated five million children who are currently working in the field of agriculture which steadily increases during the time of harvest. Along with 30% of children who are picking coffee, there are an estimated 25,000 school age children who work year round.

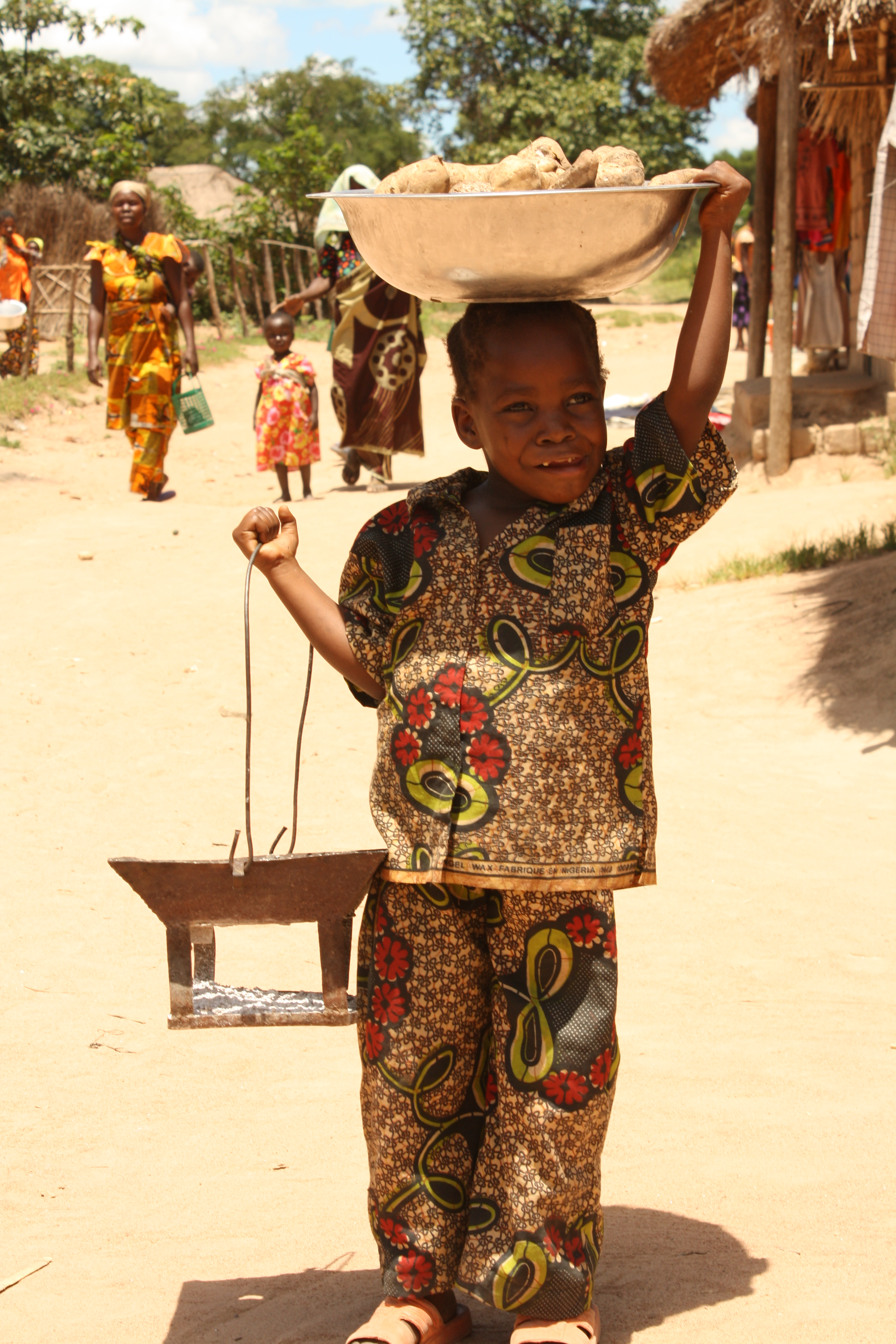
Little girl carrying heavy items. Katanga region, DRC; Congo, Africa.

What industries children work in depends on whether they grew up in a rural area or an urban area. Children who were born in urban areas often found themselves working for street vendors, washing cars, helping in construction sites, weaving clothing, and sometimes even working as exotic dancers. While children who grew up in rural areas would work on farms doing physical labour, working with animals, and selling crops. Many children can also be found working in hazardous environments, with some using bare hands, stones and hammers to take apart CRT-based televisions and computer monitors. Of all the child workers, the most serious cases involved street children and trafficked children due to the physical and emotional abuse they endured by their employers. To address the issue of child labour, the United Nations Conventions on the Rights of the Child Act was implemented in 1959. Yet due to poverty, lack of education and ignorance, the legal actions were not/are not wholly enforced or accepted in Africa.

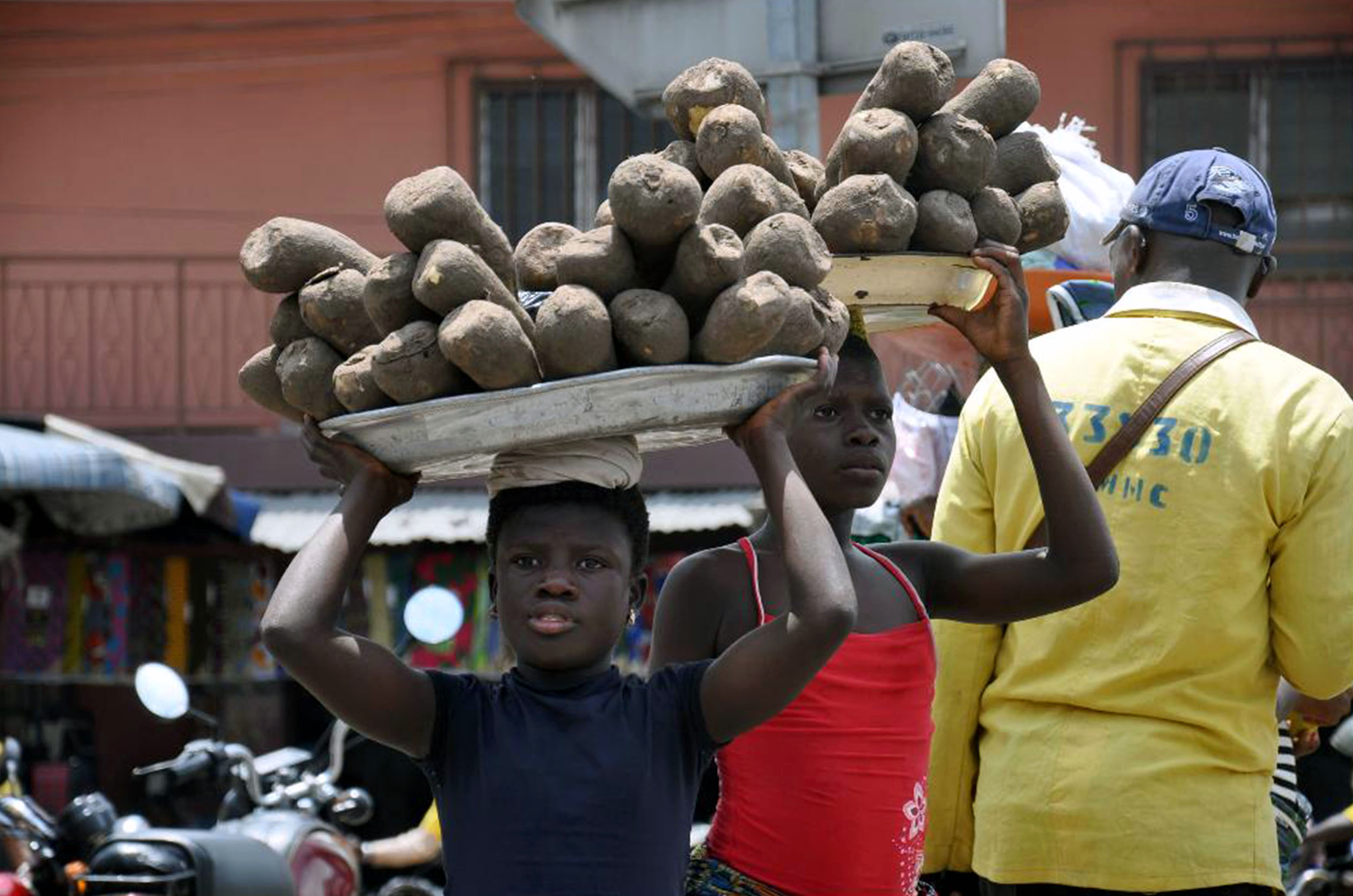
Young street vendors in Benin

Other legal factors that have been implemented to end and reduce child labour includes the global response that came into force in 1979 by the declaration of the International Year of the Child. Along with the Human Rights Committee of the United Nations, these two declarations worked on many levels to eliminate child labour. Although many actions have been taken to end this epidemic, child labour in Africa is still an issue today due to the unclear definition of adolescence and how much time is needed for children to engage in activities that are crucial for their development. Another issue that often comes into play is the link between what constitutes as child labour within the household due to the cultural acceptance of children helping run the family business. In the end, there is a consistent challenge for the national government to strengthen its grip politically on child labour, and to increase education and awareness on the issue of children working below the legal age limit. With children playing an important role in the African economy, child labour still plays an important role for many in the 20th century.

=== Australia ===
From European settlement in 1788, child convicts were occasionally sent to Australia where they were made to work. Child labour was not as common in Australia as in Britain. With a low population, agricultural productivity was higher and families did not face the risk of starvation to the same extent as in established industrialised countries. Australia also did not have significant industry until the later part of the 20th century, when child labour laws and compulsory schooling had developed under the influence of Britain. From the 1870s, child labour was restricted by compulsory schooling.

Child labour laws in Australia differ from state to state. Generally, formal work restrictions exist for children under 15 years of age. These restrictions apply to work hours and the type of work that children can perform. In all states, children are obliged to attend school until a minimum leaving age, 15 years of age in all states except Tasmania and Queensland where the leaving age is 17.

=== Brazil ===
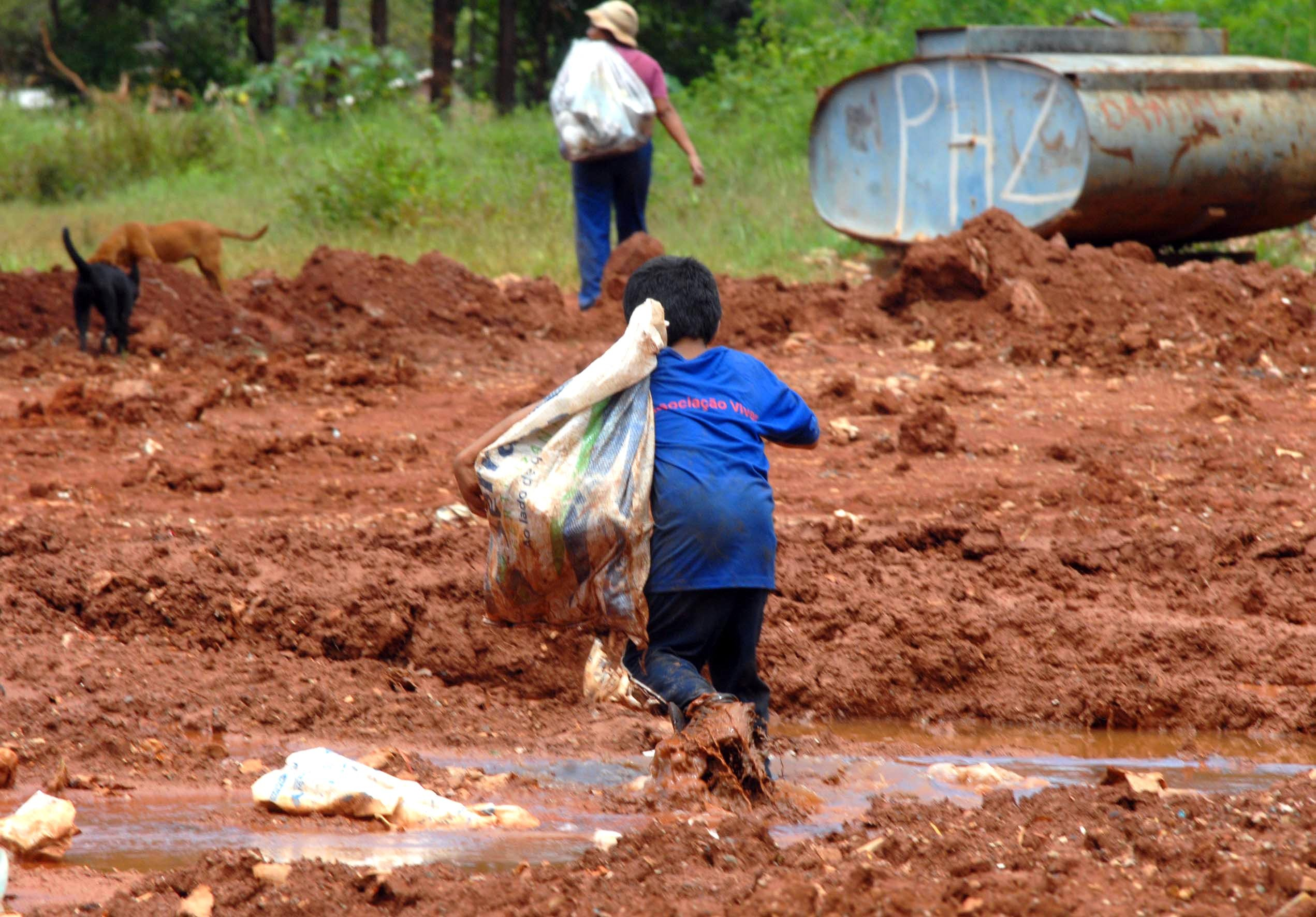
Child labour in Brazil, leaving after collecting recyclables from a landfill

Child labour has been a consistent struggle for children in Brazil ever since Portuguese colonisation in the region began in 1500. Work that many children took part in was not always visible, legal, or paid. Free or slave labour was a common occurrence for many youths and was a part of their everyday lives as they grew into adulthood. Yet due to there being no clear definition of how to classify what a child or youth is, there has been little historical documentation of child labour during the colonial period. Due to this lack of documentation, it is hard to determine just how many children were used for what kinds of work before the nineteenth century. The first documentation of child labour in Brazil occurred during the time of indigenous societies and slave labour where it was found that children were forcibly working on tasks that exceeded their emotional and physical limits. Armando Dias, for example, died in November 1913 whilst still very young, a victim of an electric shock when entering the textile industry where he worked. Boys and girls were victims of industrial accidents on a daily basis.

In Brazil, the minimum working age has been identified as fourteen due to constitutional amendments that passed in 1934, 1937, and 1946. Yet due to a change in the dictatorship by the military in the 1980s, the minimum age restriction was reduced to twelve but was reviewed due to reports of dangerous and hazardous working conditions in 1988. This led to the minimum age being raised once again to 14. Another set of restrictions was passed in 1998 that restricted the kinds of work youth could partake in, such as work that was considered hazardous like running construction equipment, or certain kinds of factory work. Although many steps were taken to reduce the risk and occurrence of child labour, there is still a high number of children and adolescents working under the age of fourteen in Brazil. It was not until recently in the 1980s that it was discovered that almost nine million children in Brazil were working illegally and not partaking in traditional childhood activities that help to develop important life experiences.

Brazilian census data (PNAD, 1999) indicate that 2.55 million 10- to 14-year-olds were illegally holding jobs. They were joined by 3.7 million 15- to 17-year-olds and about 375,000 5- to 9-year-olds. Due to the raised age restriction of 14, at least half of the recorded young workers had been employed illegally, which led to many not being protected by important labour laws. Although substantial time has passed since the time of regulated child labour, there are still many children working illegally in Brazil. Many children are used by drug cartels to sell and carry drugs, guns, and other illegal substances because of their perception of innocence. This type of work that youth are taking part in is very dangerous due to the physical and psychological implications that come with these jobs. Yet despite the hazards that come with working with drug dealers, there has been an increase in this area of employment throughout the country.

=== Britain ===
Many factors played a role in Britain's long-term economic growth, such as the Industrial Revolution in the late 1700s and the prominent presence of child labour during the industrial age. Children who worked at an early age were often not forced; but did so because they needed to help their family survive financially. Due to poor employment opportunities for many parents, sending their children to work on farms and in factories was a way to help feed and support the family. Child labour first started to occur in England when household businesses were turned into local labour markets that mass-produced the once homemade goods. Because children often helped produce the goods out of their homes, working in a factory to make those same goods was a simple change for many of these youths. Although there are many counts of children under the age of ten working for factories, the majority of children workers were between the ages of ten and fourteen.

Another factor that influenced child labour was the demographic changes that occurred in the eighteenth century. By the end of the eighteenth century, 20 per cent of the population was made up of children between the ages of 5 and 14. Due to this substantial shift in available workers, and the development of the industrial revolution, children began to work earlier in life in companies outside of the home. Yet, even though there was an increase of child labour in factories such as cotton textiles, there were large numbers of children working in the field of agriculture and domestic production.

With so many children working, little or no schooling increased child illiteracy. More working-class parents chose not to send their children to work. Economic changes — advancing technology, raised wages, more factory regulations — reduced number of child workers.

In 1933, England and Wales adopted legislation restricting the use of children under 14 in employment. The Children and Young Persons Act 1933, defined the term child as anyone of compulsory school age (age sixteen). In general no child may be employed under the age of fifteen years, or fourteen years for light work.

=== Cambodia ===
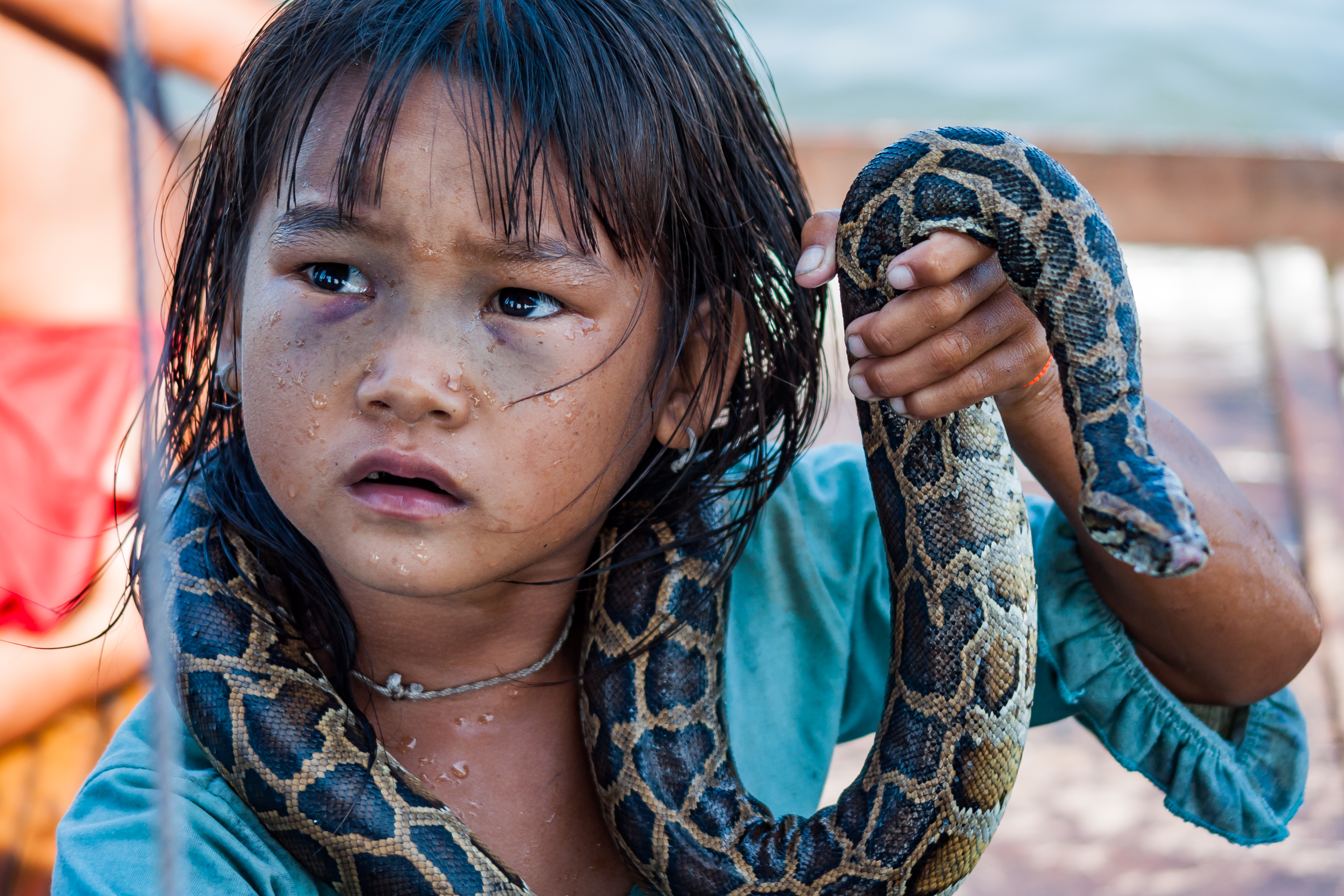
A little girl making money for her family by posing with a snake in a water village of Tonle Sap Lake

Significant levels of child labour appear to be found in Cambodia. In 1998, ILO estimated that 24.1% of children in Cambodia aged between 10 and 14 were economically active. Many of these children work long hours and Cambodia Human Development Report 2000 reported that approximately 65,000 children between the ages of 5 and 13 worked 25 hours a week and did not attend school. There are also many initiative and policies put in place to decrease the prevalence of child labour such as the United States generalised system of preferences, the U.S.-Cambodia textile agreement, ILO Garment Sector Working Conditions Improvement Project, and ChildWise Tourism.

=== Ecuador ===
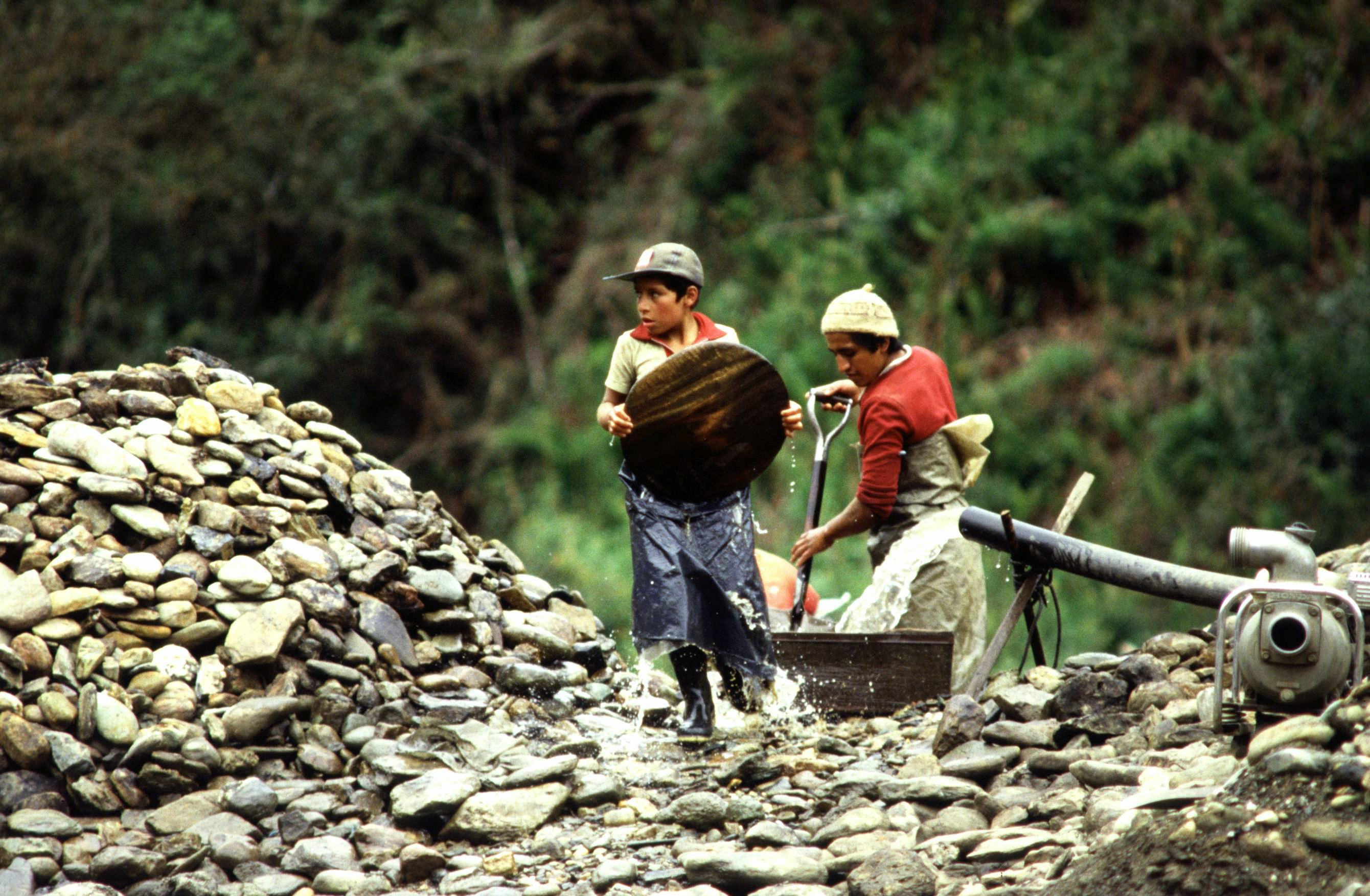
Child labour in a quarry, Ecuador

An Ecuadorean study published in 2006 found child labour to be one of the main environmental problems affecting children's health. It reported that over 800,000 children are working in Ecuador, where they are exposed to heavy metals and toxic chemicals and are subject to mental and physical stress and the insecurity caused by being at risk of work-related accidents. Minors performing agricultural work along with their parents help apply pesticides without wearing protective equipment.

=== India ===
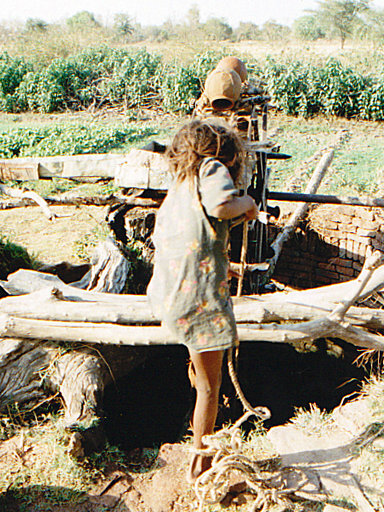
Working girl in India

In 2015, the country of India is home to the largest number of children who are working illegally in various industrial industries. Agriculture in India is the largest sector where many children work at early ages to help support their family. Many of these children are forced to work at young ages due to many family factors such as unemployment, large families, poverty, and lack of parental education. This is often the major cause of the high rate of child labour in India.

On 23 June 1757, the English East India Company defeated Siraj-ud-Daula, the Nawab of Bengal, in the Battle of Plassey. The British thus became masters of east India (Bengal, Bihar, Orissa) – a prosperous region with a flourishing agriculture, industry and trade. This led to many children being forced into labour due to the increasing need of cheap labour to produce large numbers of goods. Many multinationals often employed children because that they can be recruited for less pay, and have more endurance to utilise in factory environments. Another reason many Indian children were hired was because they lack knowledge of their basic rights, they did not cause trouble or complain, and they were often more trustworthy. The innocence that comes with childhood was utilised to make a profit by many and was encouraged by the need for family income.

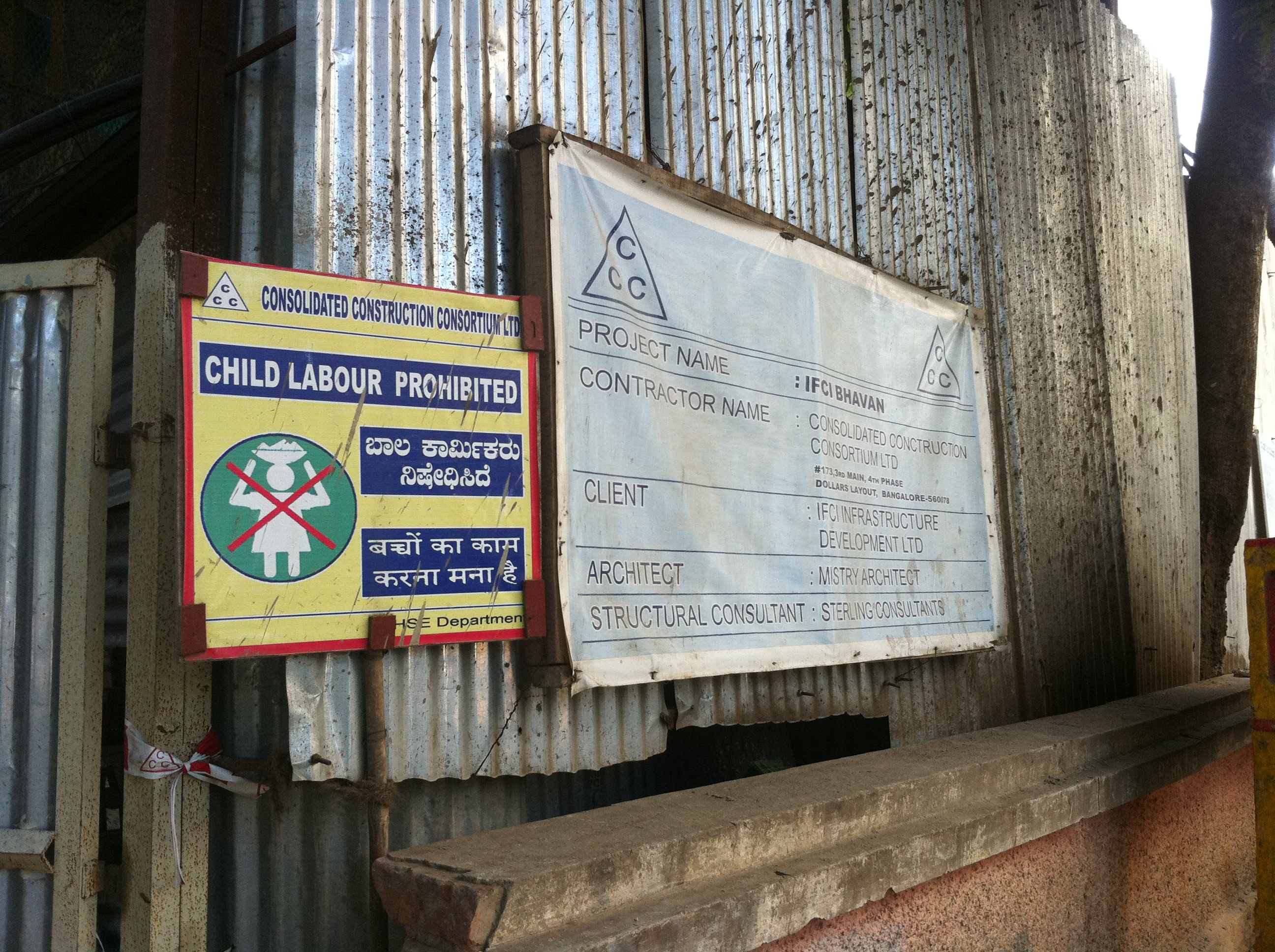
A sign at a construction site in Bangalore: "Child labour prohibited"

A variety of Indian social scientists as well as the non-governmental organisations (NGOs) have done extensive research on the numeric figures of child labour found in India and determined that India contributes to one-third of Asia's child labour and one-fourth of the world's child labour. Due to many children being illegally employed, the Indian government began to take extensive actions to reduce the number of children working, and to focus on the importance of facilitating the proper growth and development of children. International influences help to encourage legal actions to be taken in India, such as the Geneva Declaration of the Right of Children Act was passed in 1924. This act was followed by The Universal Declaration of Human Rights in 1948 to which incorporated the basic human rights and needs of children for proper progression and growth in their younger years. These international acts encouraged major changes to the workforce in India which occurred in 1986 when the Child Labour (Prohibition and Regulation) Act was put into place. This act prohibited hiring children younger than the age of 14, and from working in hazardous conditions.

Due to the increase of regulations and legal restrictions on child labour, there has been a 64 per cent decline in child labour from 1993 to 2005. Although this is a great decrease in the country of India, there is still high numbers of children working in the rural areas of India. With 85 per cent of the child labour occurring in rural areas, and 15 per cent occurring in urban areas, there are still substantial areas of concern in the country of India.

India has legislation since 1986 which allows work by children in non-hazardous industry. In 2013, the Punjab and Haryana High Court gave a landmark order that directed that there shall be a total ban on the employment of children up to the age of 14 years, be it hazardous or non-hazardous industries. However, the Court ruled that a child can work with his or her family in family based trades/occupations, for the purpose of learning a new trade/craftsmanship or vocation.

=== Iran ===
The phenomenon of children labour is one of the social issues of Iranian society, which has taken on serious and diverse dimensions over time. Researches and official and unofficial data show that this social damage is more common in big cities. Also, research data shows that most of the working children in Tehran province are related to Afghan children who have immigrated to Iran legally or illegally.

Kameel Ahmady, a social researcher and winner of the Literature and Humanities award from the World Peace Foundation, while emphasizing the fact that most of the children labour in Tehran province are Afghan children, along with his colleagues believes that with the continuation of Iran's economic crisis, the lack of proper mechanisms to manage and control the phenomenon and absence of legal working visa scheme for Afghan immigrants have caused this social harm to spread.

Abdolreza Rahmani Fazli, the Minister of Interior at the time in August 2019, while analysing and describing the situation of working children in Tehran, said: "Reports show that street children live in poor conditions and are exploited." One thing that should be noted is that up to 80% of these children are non-Iranian. Considering that some of these children were Afghan nationals, we have raised the issue with the embassy of this country. If other institutions cooperate, we can take appropriate measures to organise street children, but if they do not cooperate. It has also been decided to issue arrest warrants for gangs exploiting children with the cooperation of the police force and the judicial system.

In Isfahan province, the Iranian Department of State Welfare (behzisti) keeps a database of the scanned retina irises of a number of working street kids, and have put "child friendly" measures in place to support them, reduce the social harm from their presence, and improve their quality of life.

During the 2026 Iran War, Rahim Nadali, an IRGC official in Tehran, announced the launch of the initiative "For Iran" which recruits 12 year olds into the Basij militia for them to assist in manning "operational patrols" and checkpoints, as well as providing logistical support and performing other duties. This move contradicts Iran's commitment to abstain from the use of children in military activities under the Convention on the Rights of the Child. However, Nadali justified to move stating "Given that the age of those coming forward has dropped and they are asking to take part, we lowered the minimum age to 12". According to Al-Arabiya, from the beginning of the war, Tehran residents reported of untrained teenagers and youths armed with Uzi sub-machine guns and Kalshnikov rifles, stopping vehicles, shouting orders, and firing warning shots into the air.

=== Ireland ===
In post-colonial Ireland, the rate of child exploitation was extremely high as children were used as farm labourers once they were able to walk, these children were never paid for the labour that they carried out on the family farm. Children were wanted and desired in Ireland for the use of their labour on the family farm. Irish parents felt that it was the children's duty to carry out chores on the family farm.

=== Japan ===
Though banned in modern Japan, shonenko (child labourers) were a feature of the Imperial era until its end in 1945. During World War II labour recruiting efforts targeted youths from Taiwan (Formosa), then a Japanese territory, with promises of educational opportunity. Though the target of 25,000 recruits was never reached, over 8,400 Taiwanese youths aged 12 to 14 relocated to Japan to help manufacture the Mitsubishi J2M Raiden aircraft.

=== The Netherlands ===
Child labour existed in the Netherlands up to and through the Industrial Revolution. Laws governing child labour in factories were first passed in 1874, but child labour on farms continued to be the norm up until the 20th century.

=== Soviet Union and successor states ===
Although formally banned since 1922, child labour was widespread in the Soviet Union, mostly in the form of mandatory, unpaid work by schoolchildren on Saturdays and holidays. The students were used as a cheap, unqualified workforce on kolhoz (collective farms) as well as in industry and forestry. The practice was formally called "work education".

From the 1950s on, the students were also used for unpaid work at schools, where they cleaned and performed repairs. This practice has continued in the Russian Federation, where up to 21 days of the summer holidays is sometimes set aside for school works. By law, this is only allowed as part of specialised occupational training and with the students' and parents' permission, but those provisions are widely ignored. In 2012 there was an accident near the city of Nalchik where a car killed several pupils cleaning up a highway shoulder during their "holiday work", as well as their teacher, who was supervising them.

Out of former Soviet Union republics Uzbekistan continued and expanded the program of child labour on industrial scale to increase profits on the main source of Islam Karimov's income, cotton harvesting. In September, when school normally starts, the classes are suspended and children are sent to cotton fields for work, where they are assigned daily quotas of 20 to 60 kg of raw cotton they have to collect. This process is repeated in spring, when collected cotton needs to be hoed and weeded. In 2006 it is estimated that 2.7 million children were forced to work this way.

=== Switzerland ===
As in many other countries, child labour in Switzerland affected among the so-called Kaminfegerkinder ("chimney sweep children") and children working p.e. in spinning mills, factories and in agriculture in 19th-century Switzerland, but also to the 1960s so-called Verdingkinder (literally: "contract children" or "indentured child labourers") were children who were taken from their parents, often due to poverty or moral reasons – usually mothers being unmarried, very poor citizens, of Gypsy–Yeniche origin, so-called Kinder der Landstrasse, etc. – and sent to live with new families, often poor farmers who needed cheap labour.

There were even Verdingkinder auctions where children were handed over to the farmer asking the least money from the authorities, thus securing cheap labour for his farm and relieving the authority from the financial burden of looking after the children. In the 1930s 20% of all agricultural labourers in the Canton of Bern were children below the age of 15. Swiss municipality guardianship authorities acted so, commonly tolerated by federal authorities, to the 1960s, not all of them of course, but usually communities affected of low taxes in some Swiss cantons Swiss historian Marco Leuenberger investigated, that in 1930 there were some 35,000 indentured children, and between 1920 and 1970 more than 100,000 are believed to have been placed with families or homes. 10,000 Verdingkinder are still alive. Therefore, the so-called Wiedergutmachungsinitiative was started in April 2014. In April 2014 the collection of targeted at least authenticated 100,000 signatures of Swiss citizens has started, and still have to be collected to October 2015.

=== United States ===
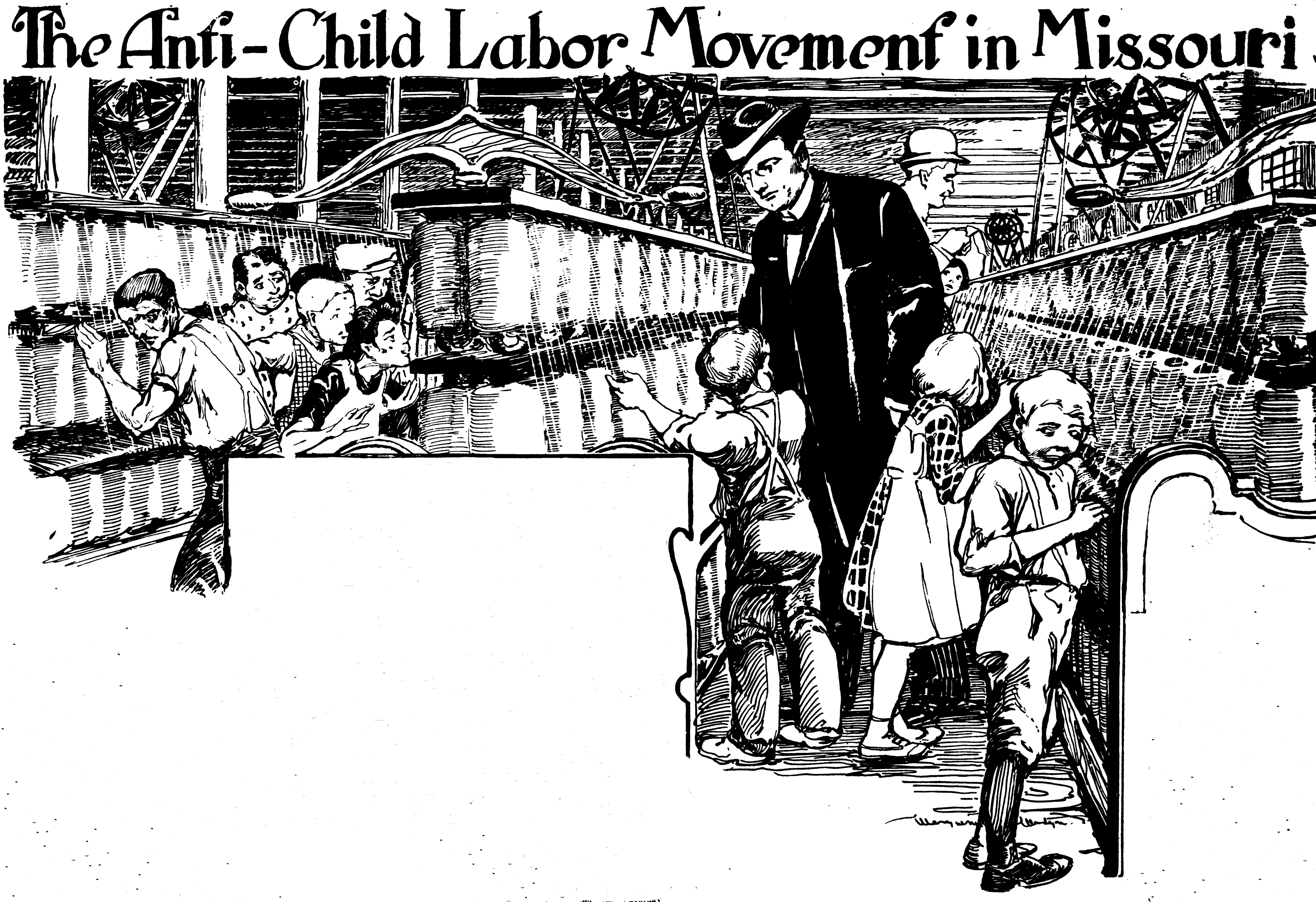
Missouri Governor Joseph W. Folk inspecting child labourers in 1906 in an image drawn by journalist Marguerite Martyn

Child labour laws in the United States are found at the federal and state levels. The most sweeping federal law that restricts the employment and abuse of child workers is the Fair Labor Standards Act (FLSA). Child labour provisions under FLSA are designed to protect the educational opportunities of youth and prohibit their employment in jobs that are detrimental to their health and safety. FLSA restricts the hours that youth under 16 years of age can work and lists hazardous occupations too dangerous for young workers to perform.

Under the FLSA, for non-agricultural jobs, children under 14 may not be employed, children between 14 and 16 may be employed in allowed occupations during limited hours, and children between 16 and 17 may be employed for unlimited hours in non-hazardous occupations. A number of exceptions to these rules exist, such as for employment by parents, newspaper delivery, and child actors. The regulations for agricultural employment are generally less strict.

States have varying laws covering youth employment. Each state has minimum requirements such as, earliest age a child may begin working, number of hours a child is allowed to be working during the day, number of hours a child is allowed to be worked during the week. The United States Department of Labor lists the minimum requirements for agricultural work in each state. Where state law differs from federal law on child labour, the law with the more rigorous standard applies.

Individual states have a wide range of restrictions on labour by minors, often requiring work permits for minors who are still enrolled in high school. Many states also limit the times and hours minors may work in non-agricultural jobs, as categorized by age, in addition to imposing additional safety regulations.

== Laws and initiatives ==
Almost every country in the world has laws relating to and aimed at preventing child labour. International Labour Organization has helped set international law, which most countries have signed on and ratified. According to ILO minimum age convention (C138) of 1973, child labour refers to any work performed by children under the age of 12, non-light work done by children aged 12–14, and hazardous work done by children aged 15–17. Light work was defined, under this convention, as any work that does not harm a child's health and development, and that does not interfere with his or her attendance at school. This convention has been ratified by 171 countries.

The United Nations adopted the Convention on the Rights of the Child in 1990, which was subsequently ratified by 193 countries. Article 32 of the convention addressed child labour, as follows:

...Parties recognise the right of the child to be protected from economic exploitation and from performing any work that is likely to be hazardous or to interfere with the child's education, or to be harmful to the child's health or physical, mental, spiritual, moral or social development.

Under Article 1 of the 1990 Convention, a child is defined as "every human being below the age of eighteen years unless, under the law applicable to the child, a majority is attained earlier." Article 28 of this Convention requires States to, "make primary education compulsory and available free to all."

As of 2024, 196 countries are party to the convention; the only nation that has not ratified the treaty is the United States.

In 1999, ILO helped lead the Worst Forms Convention 182 (C182), which has so far been signed upon and domestically ratified by 151 countries including the United States. This international law prohibits worst forms of child labour, defined as all forms of slavery and slavery-like practices, such as child trafficking, debt bondage, and forced labour, including forced recruitment of children into armed conflict. The law also prohibits the use of a child for prostitution or the production of pornography, child labour in illicit activities such as drug production and trafficking; and in hazardous work. Both the Worst Forms Convention (C182) and the Minimum Age Convention (C138) are examples of international labour standards implemented through the ILO that deal with child labour.

In addition to setting the international law, the United Nations initiated International Program on the Elimination of Child Labour (IPEC) in 1992. This initiative aims to progressively eliminate child labour through strengthening national capacities to address some of the causes of child labour. Amongst the key initiative is the so-called time-bounded programme countries, where child labour is most prevalent and schooling opportunities lacking. The initiative seeks to achieve amongst other things, universal primary school availability. The IPEC has expanded to at least the following target countries: Bangladesh, Brazil, China, Egypt, India, Indonesia, Mexico, Nigeria, Pakistan, Democratic Republic of Congo, El Salvador, Nepal, Tanzania, Dominican Republic, Costa Rica, Philippines, Senegal, South Africa and Turkey.

Targeted child labour campaigns were initiated by the International Programme on the Elimination of Child Labour (IPEC) in order to advocate for prevention and elimination of all forms of child labour. The global Music against Child Labour Initiative was launched in 2013 in order to involve socially excluded children in structured musical activity and education in efforts to help protect them from child labour.

=== Exceptions granted ===
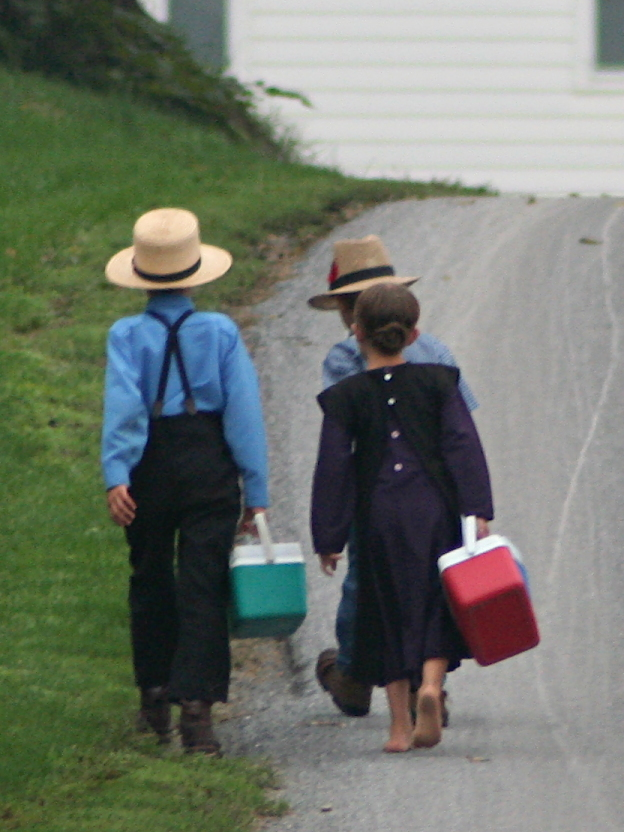
The United States has passed a law that allows Amish children older than 14 to work in traditional wood enterprises with proper supervision.

In 2004, the United States passed an amendment to the Fair Labor Standards Act of 1938. The amendment allows certain children aged 14–18 to work in or outside a business where machinery is used to process wood. The law aims to respect the religious and cultural needs of the Amish community of the United States. The Amish believe that one effective way to educate children is on the job. The new law allows Amish children the ability to work with their families, once they are past eighth grade in school.

Similarly, in 1996, member countries of the European Union, per Directive 94/33/EC, agreed to a number of exceptions for young people in its child labour laws. Under these rules, children of various ages may work in cultural, artistic, sporting or advertising activities if authorised by the competent authority. Children above the age of 13 may perform light work for a limited number of hours per week in other economic activities as defined at the discretion of each country. Additionally, the European law exception allows children aged 14 years or over to work as part of a work/training scheme. The EU Directive clarified that these exceptions do not allow child labour where the children may experience harmful exposure to dangerous substances. Nonetheless, many children under the age of 13 do work, even in the most developed countries of the EU. For instance, a recent study showed over a third of Dutch twelve-year-old kids had a job, the most common being babysitting.

=== More laws vs. more freedom ===
Very often, however, these state laws were not enforced... Federal legislation was passed in 1916 and again in 1919, but both laws were declared unconstitutional by the Supreme Court. Although the number of child workers declined dramatically during the 1920s and 1930s, it was not until the Fair Labor Standards Act in 1938 that federal regulation of child labor finally became a reality.

— Smithsonian, on child labour in early 20th century United States

Scholars disagree on the best legal course forward to address child labour. Some suggest the need for laws that place a blanket ban on any work by children less than 18 years old. Others suggest the current international laws are enough, and the need for more engaging approach to achieve the ultimate goals.

Some scholars suggest any labour by children aged 18 years or less is wrong since this encourages illiteracy, inhumane work and lower investment in human capital. These activists claim that child labour also leads to poor labour standards for adults, depresses the wages of adults in developing countries as well as the developed countries, and dooms the third world economies to low-skill jobs only capable of producing poor quality cheap exports. More children that work in poor countries, the fewer and worse-paid are the jobs for adults in these countries. In other words, there are moral and economic reasons that justify a blanket ban on labour from children aged 18 years or less, everywhere in the world.

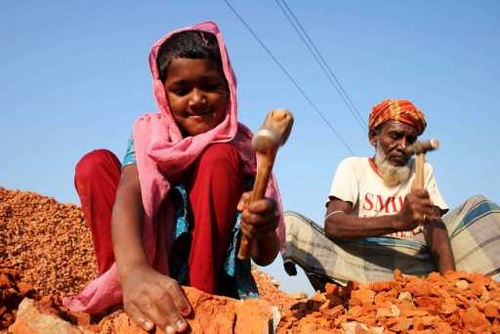
Child labour in Bangladesh

Other scholars suggest that these arguments are flawed and ignore history, and that more laws will do more harm than good. According to them, child labour is merely the symptom of poverty. If laws ban all lawful work that enables the poor to survive, informal economy, illicit operations and underground businesses will thrive. These will increase abuse of the children. In poor countries with very high incidence rates of child labour – such as Ethiopia, Chad, Niger and Nepal – schools are not available, and the few schools that exist offer poor quality education or are unaffordable. The alternatives for children who currently work, claim these studies, are worse: grinding subsistence farming, militia or prostitution. Child labour is not a choice, it is a necessity, the only option for survival. It is currently the least undesirable of a set of very bad choices. Traidcraft Exchange and Homeworkers Worldwide argue that attempts to eliminate child labour without addressing the level of adult earnings may lead to children being engaged in labour in "less visible and more hazardous occupations".

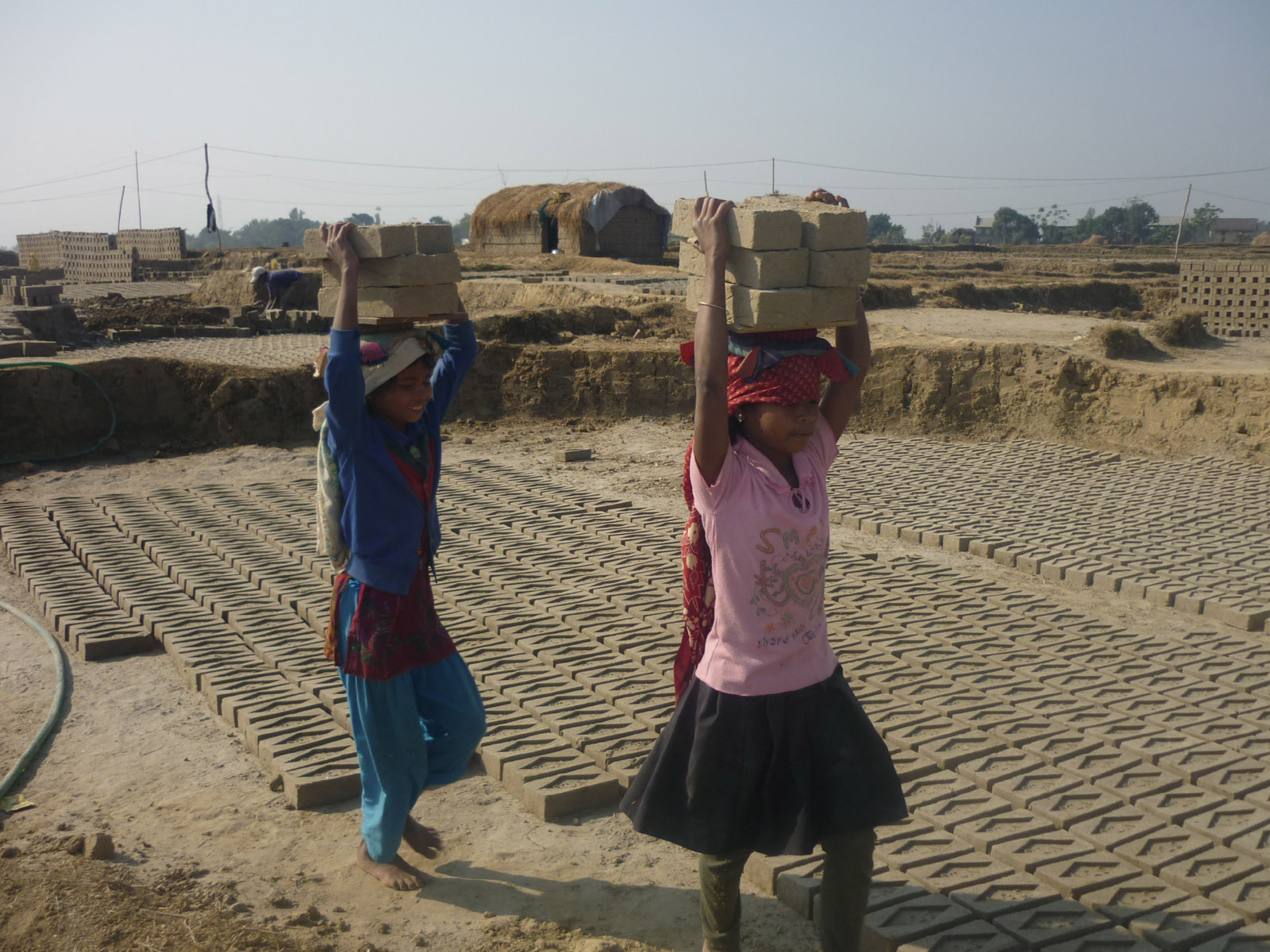
Nepali girls working in brick factory

These scholars suggest, from their studies of economic and social data, that early 20th-century child labour in Europe and the United States ended in large part as a result of the economic development of the formal regulated economy, technology development and general prosperity. Child labour laws and ILO conventions came later. Edmonds suggests, even in contemporary times, the incidence of child labour in Vietnam has rapidly reduced following economic reforms and GDP growth. These scholars suggest economic engagement, emphasis on opening quality schools rather than more laws and expanding economically relevant skill development opportunities in the third world. International legal actions, such as trade sanctions increase child labour.

The Incredible Bread Machine, a book published by "World Research, Inc." in 1974, stated:

Child labour was a particular target of early reformers. William Cooke Tatlor wrote at the time about these reformers who, witnessing children at work in the factories, thought to themselves: 'How much more delightful would have been the gambol of the free limbs on the hillside; the sight of the green mead with its spangles of buttercups and daisies; the song of the bird and the humming bee...' But for many of these children the factory system meant quite literally the only chance for survival. Today we overlook the fact that death from starvation and exposure was a common fate before the Industrial Revolution, for the pre-capitalist economy was barely able to support the population. Yes, children were working. Formerly they would have starved. It was only as goods were produced in greater abundance at a lower cost that men could support their families without sending their children to work. It was not the reformer or the politician that ended the grim necessity for child labour; it was capitalism.

== Incidents ==
=== Cocoa production ===
In 1998, UNICEF reported that Ivory Coast farmers used enslaved children – many from surrounding countries. In late 2000 a BBC documentary reported the use of enslaved children in the production of cocoa – the main ingredient in chocolate – in West Africa. Other media followed by reporting widespread child slavery and child trafficking in the production of cocoa. In 2001, the US State Department estimated there were 15,000 child slaves cocoa, cotton and coffee farms in the Ivory Coast, and the Chocolate Manufacturers Association acknowledged that child slavery is used in the cocoa harvest.

Malian migrants have long worked on cocoa farms in the Ivory Coast, but in 2000 cocoa prices had dropped to a 10-year low and some farmers stopped paying their employees. The Malian counsel had to rescue some boys who had not been paid for five years and who were beaten if they tried to run away. Malian officials believed that 15,000 children, some as young as 11 years old, were working in the Ivory Coast in 2001. These children were often from poor families or the slums and were sold to work in other countries. Parents were told the children would find work and send money home, but once the children left home, they often worked in conditions resembling slavery. In other cases, children begging for food were lured from bus stations and sold as slaves. In 2002, the Ivory Coast had 12,000 children with no relatives nearby, which suggested they were trafficked, likely from neighboring Mali, Burkina Faso and Togo.

The cocoa industry was accused of profiting from child slavery and trafficking. The European Cocoa Association dismissed these accusations as "false and excessive" and the industry said the reports were not representative of all areas. Later the industry acknowledged the working conditions for children were unsatisfactory and children's rights were sometimes violated and acknowledged the claims could not be ignored. In a BBC interview, the ambassador for Ivory Coast to the United Kingdom called these reports of widespread use of slave child labour by 700,000 cocoa farmers as absurd and inaccurate.

In 2001, a voluntary agreement called the Harkin–Engel Protocol, was accepted by the international cocoa and chocolate industry to eliminate the worst forms of child labour, as defined by ILO's Convention 182, in West Africa. This agreement created a foundation named International Cocoa Initiative in 2002. The foundation claims it has, as of 2011, active programs in 290 cocoa growing communities in Côte d'Ivoire and Ghana, reaching a total population of 689,000 people to help eliminate the worst forms of child labour in cocoa industry. Other organisations claim progress has been made, but the protocol's 2005 deadlines have not yet been met.

=== Mining in Africa ===
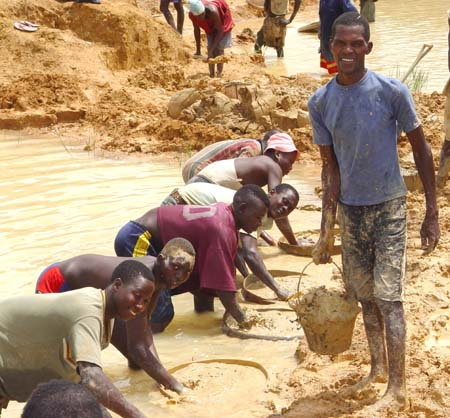
Children engaged in diamond mining in Sierra Leone

In 2008, Bloomberg claimed child labour in copper and cobalt mines that supplied Chinese companies in Congo. The children are creuseurs, that is they dig the ore by hand, carry sacks of ores on their backs, and these are then purchased by these companies. Over 60 of Katanga's 75 processing plants are owned by Chinese companies and 90 per cent of the region's minerals go to China. An African NGO report claimed 80,000 child labourers under the age of 15, or about 40% of all miners, were supplying ore to Chinese companies in this African region. Amnesty International alleged in 2016 that some cobalt sold by Congo Dongfang Mining was produced by child labour, and that it was being used in lithium-ion batteries powering electric cars and mobile devices worldwide.

BBC, in 2012, accused Glencore of using child labour in its mining and smelting operations of Africa. Glencore denied it used child labour, and said it has strict policy of not using child labour. The company claimed it has a strict policy whereby all copper was mined correctly, placed in bags with numbered seals and then sent to the smelter. Glencore mentioned being aware of child miners who were part of a group of artisanal miners who had without authorisation raided the concession awarded to the company since 2010; Glencore has been pleading with the government to remove the artisanal miners from the concession.

Small-scale artisanal mining of gold is another source of dangerous child labour in poor rural areas in certain parts of the world. This form of mining uses labour-intensive and low-tech methods. It is informal sector of the economy. Human Rights Watch group estimates that about 12 per cent of global gold production comes from artisanal mines. In west Africa, in countries such as Mali – the third largest exporter of gold in Africa – between 20,000 and 40,000 children work in artisanal mining. Locally known as orpaillage, children as young as six years old work with their families. These children and families suffer chronic exposure to toxic chemicals including mercury, and do hazardous work such as digging shafts and working underground, pulling up, carrying and crushing the ore. The poor work practices harm the long-term health of children, as well as release hundreds of tons of mercury every year into local rivers, ground water and lakes. Gold is important to the economy of Mali and Ghana. For Mali, it is the second largest earner of its export revenue. For many poor families with children, it is the primary and sometimes the only source of income.

=== Meatpacking ===
In early August 2008, Iowa Labour Commissioner David Neil announced that his department had found that Agriprocessors, a kosher meatpacking company in Postville which had recently been raided by Immigration and Customs Enforcement, had employed 57 minors, some as young as 14, in violation of state law prohibiting anyone under 18 from working in a meatpacking plant. Neil announced that he was turning the case over to the state Attorney General for prosecution, claiming that his department's inquiry had discovered "egregious violations of virtually every aspect of Iowa's child labour laws." Agriprocessors claimed that it was at a loss to understand the allegations. Agriprocessors' CEO went to trial on these charges in state court on 4 May 2010. After a five-week trial he was found not guilty of all 57 charges of child labour violations by the Black Hawk County District Court jury in Waterloo, Iowa, on 7 June 2010.

=== GAP ===
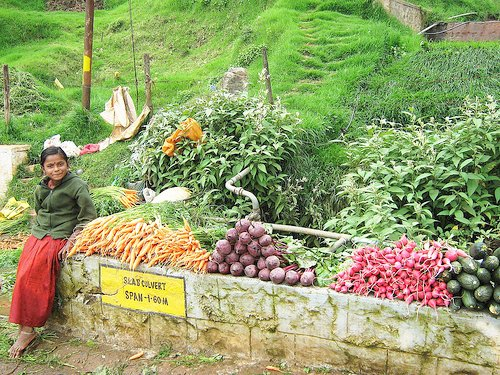
Working child in Ooty, India

A 2007 report claimed some GAP products had been produced by child labourers. GAP acknowledged the problem and announced it is pulling the products from its shelves. The report found that GAP had rigorous social audit systems since 2004 to eliminate child labour in its supply chain. However, the report concluded that the system was being abused by unscrupulous subcontractors.

GAP's policy, the report claimed, is that if it discovers child labour was used by its supplier in its branded clothes, the contractor must remove the child from the workplace, provide them with access to schooling and a wage, and guarantee the opportunity of work on reaching a legal working age.

In 2007, The New York Times reported that GAP, after the child labour discovery, created a $200,000 grant to improve working conditions in the supplier community. GAP created strong relationships with developing countries to help prevent child labour and find solutions; GAP would conduct interviews and reach out to their 100,000 employees worldwide to get insight into how they feel about GAP's work environments. This survey concluded with a 68 per cent response rate, and 77 per cent of respondents considered GAP a great environment to work in.

=== H&M and Zara ===
In December 2009, campaigners in the UK called on two leading high street retailers to stop selling clothes made with cotton which may have been picked by children. Anti-Slavery International and the Environmental Justice Foundation (EJF) accused H&M and Zara of using cotton suppliers in Bangladesh. It is also suspected that many of their raw materials originates from Uzbekistan, where children aged 10 are forced to work in the fields. The activists were calling to ban the use of Uzbek cotton and implement a "track and trace" systems to guarantee an ethical responsible source of the material.

H&M said it "does not accept" child labour and "seeks to avoid" using Uzbek cotton, but admitted it did "not have any reliable methods" to ensure Uzbek cotton did not end up in any of its products. Inditex, the owner of Zara, said its code of conduct banned child labour.

=== Silk weaving ===
A 2003 Human Rights Watch report claimed children as young as five years old were employed and worked for up to 12 hours a day and six to seven days a week in the silk industry. These children, HRW claimed, were bonded child labour in India, easy to find in Karnataka, Uttar Pradesh, and Tamil Nadu.

In 2010, a German news investigative report claimed that non-governmental organisations (NGOs) had found up to 10,000 children working in the 1,000 silk factories in 1998. In other locations, thousands of bonded child labourers were present in 1994. After UNICEF and NGOs got involved, the child labour figure dropped drastically after 2005, with the total estimated to be fewer than a thousand child labourers. The report claims the released children were back in school.

=== Primark ===
In 2008, the BBC reported that the company Primark was using child labour in the manufacture of clothing. In particular, a £4 hand-embroidered shirt was the starting point of a documentary produced by BBC's Panorama programme. The programme asks consumers to ask themselves, "Why am I only paying £4 for a hand embroidered top? This item looks handmade. Who made it for such little cost?", in addition to exposing the violent side of the child labour industry in countries where child exploitation is prevalent.

As a result of the BBC report, Royal Television Society awarded it a prize, and Primark took immediate action and fired three Indian suppliers in 2008.

Primark continued to investigate the allegations for three years, concluding that BBC report was a fake. In 2011, following an investigation by the BBC Trust's Editorial Standards Committee, the BBC announced, "Having carefully scrutinised all of the relevant evidence, the committee concluded that, on the balance of probabilities, it was more likely than not that the Bangalore footage was not authentic." BBC subsequently apologised for faking footage, and returned the television award for investigative reporting.

== Elimination ==
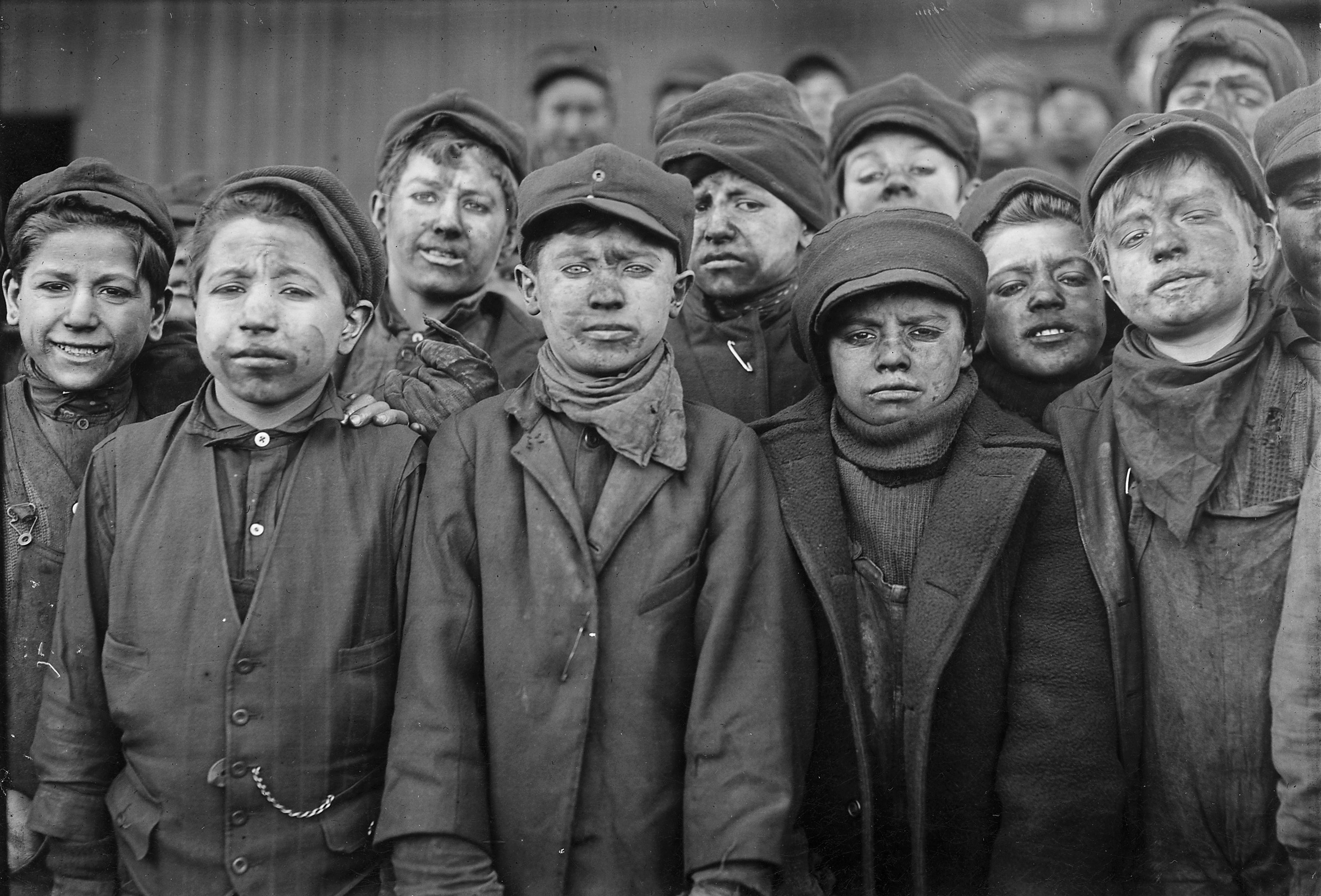
Child labour in a coal mine, United States, c. 1912. Photograph by Lewis Hine.

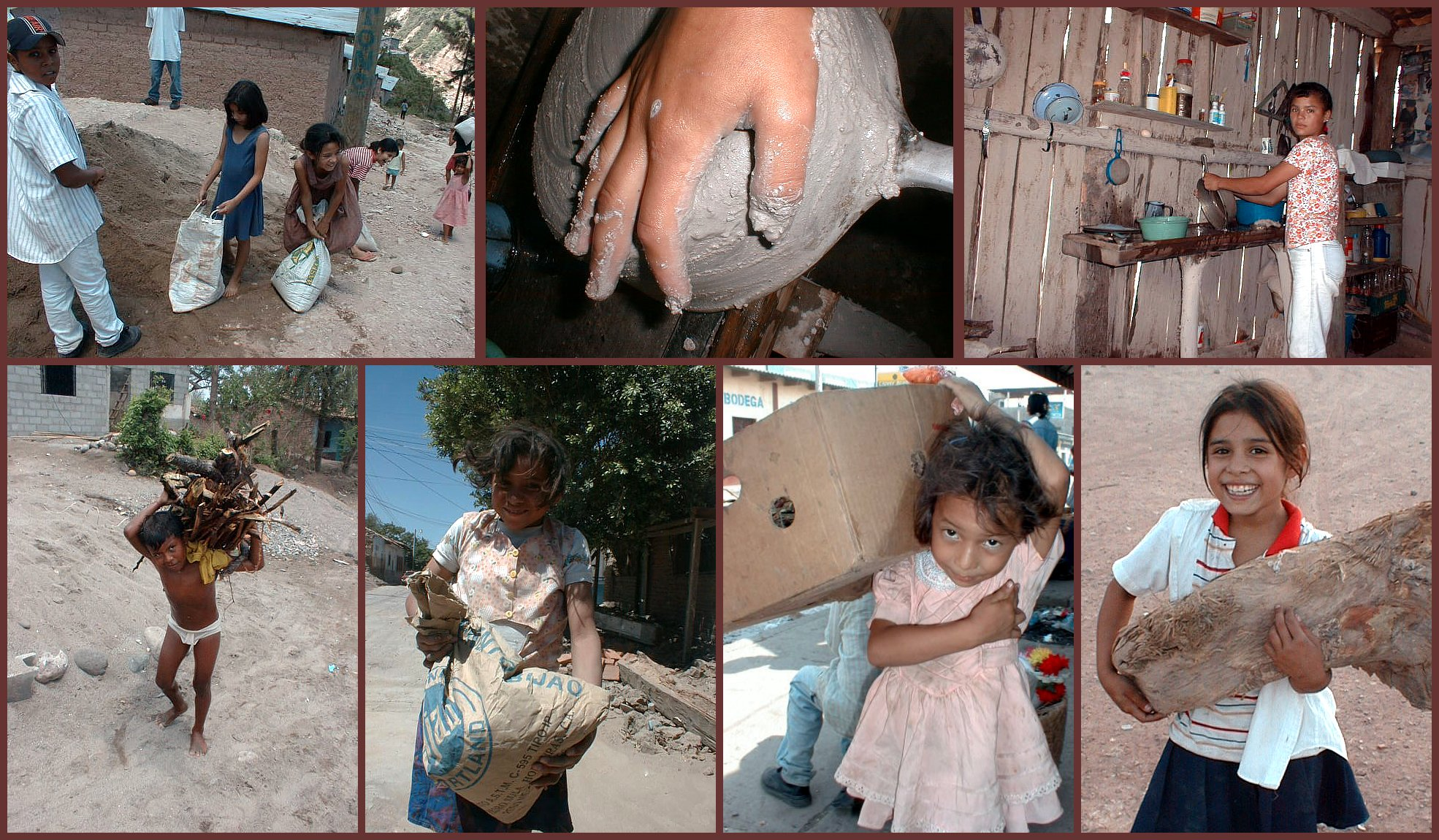
Different forms of child labour in Honduras, 1999

Concerns have often been raised over the buying public's moral complicity in purchasing products assembled or otherwise manufactured in developing countries with child labour. However, others have raised concerns that boycotting products manufactured through child labour may force these children to turn to more dangerous or strenuous professions, such as prostitution or agriculture. For example, a UNICEF study found that after the Child Labor Deterrence Act was introduced in the US, an estimated 50,000 children were dismissed from their garment industry jobs in Bangladesh, leaving many to resort to jobs such as "stone-crushing, street hustling, and prostitution", jobs that are "more hazardous and exploitative than garment production". The study suggests that boycotts are "blunt instruments with long-term consequences, that can actually harm rather than help the children involved."

According to Milton Friedman, before the Industrial Revolution virtually all children worked in agriculture. During the Industrial Revolution many of these children moved from farm work to factory work. Over time, as real wages rose, parents became able to afford to send their children to school instead of work and as a result child labour declined, both before and after legislation.

British historian and socialist E. P. Thompson in The Making of the English Working Class draws a qualitative distinction between child domestic work and participation in the wider (waged) labour market. Further, the usefulness of the experience of the industrial revolution in making predictions about current trends has been disputed. Social historian Hugh Cunningham, author of Children and Childhood in Western Society Since 1500, notes that:

Fifty years ago it might have been assumed that, just as child labour had declined in the developed world in the late nineteenth and early twentieth centuries, so it would also, in a trickle-down fashion, in the rest of the world. Its failure to do that, and its re-emergence in the developed world, raise questions about its role in any economy, whether national or global.

According to Thomas DeGregori, an economics professor at the University of Houston, in an article published by the Cato Institute, a libertarian think-tank operating in Washington D.C., "it is clear that technological and economic change are vital ingredients in getting children out of the workplace and into schools. Then they can grow to become productive adults and live longer, healthier lives. However, in poor countries like Bangladesh, working children are essential for survival in many families, as they were in our own heritage until the late 19th century. So, while the struggle to end child labour is necessary, getting there often requires taking different routes—and, sadly, there are many political obstacles.

The International Programme on the Elimination of Child Labour (IPEC), founded in 1992, aims to eliminate child labour. It operates in 88 countries and is the largest program of its kind in the world. IPEC works with international and government agencies, NGOs, the media, and children and their families to end child labour and provide children with education and assistance.

From 2008 to 2013, the ILO operated a program through IPEC entitled "Combating Abusive Child Labour (CACL-II)". The project, funded by the European Union, contributed to the Government of Pakistan by providing alternative opportunities for vocational training and education to children withdrawn from the worst forms of child labour.

Periodically, governments, employers' and workers' organisations have met in global conference to assess progress and remaining obstacles and to agree measures to eliminate the worst forms of child labour by 2016: first in Oslo (1997), followed by: The Hague (2010); Brasília, 8–10 October 2013; Buenos Aires, 14–16 November 2017; and most recently Durban, South Africa, 15–20 May 2022.

Between 2000 and 2012, progress was made against child labour but the elimination of its worst forms was not accomplished. Under the Sustainable Development Goals (SDGs) of the 2030 Agenda, UN Member States, employers' and workers' organisations, and civil society organisations are required to work together to eliminate child labour by 2025, forced labour, modern slavery and human trafficking by 2030. Thus, the ILO established Alliance 8.7 as a global partnership.

In January 2021, the ILO published the Child Labour Global Estimates 2020 in collaboration with UNICEF. According to the report child labour decreased by 38% from 246 million in 2000 to 152 million in 2016. Due to COVID-19 pandemic the number of children in child labour increased by 9 million.

== Statistics ==
Number of children involved in ILO categories of work, by age and gender in 2002
	All Children (2002)	Economically Active Children	Economically Active Children (%)	Child Labour	Child Labour (%)	Children in Hazardous Work	Children in Hazardous Work (%)
Ages 5–11	838,800,000	109,700,000	13.1	109,700,000	13.1	60,500,000	7.2
Ages 12–14	360,600,000	101,100,000	28.0	76,000,000	21.1	50,800,000	14.1
Ages 5–14	1,199,400,000	210,800,000	17.6	186,300,000	15.5	111,300,000	9.3
Ages 15–17	332,100,000	140,900,000	42.4	59,200,000	17.8	59,200,000	17.8
Boys	786,600,000	184,100,000	23.4	132,200,000	16.8	95,700,000	12.2
Girls	744,900,000	167,600,000	22.5	113,300,000	15.2	74,800,000	10.5
Total	1,531,500,000	351,700,000	23.0	245,500,000	16.0	170,500,000	11.1

Numbers and percentage of children aged 5 to 17 years in child labour and hazardous work in 2016 and 2020
	Child labour	Child labour(%)	Children in hazardous work	Children in hazardous work (%)
Ages 5– 11	89,300,000	9.7	25,900,000	2.8
Ages 12– 14	35,600,000	9.3	18,100,000	4.8
Ages 15– 17	35,000,000	9.5	35,000,000	9.5
Boys (2016)	87,500,000	10.7	44,800,000	5.5
Girls (2016)	64,100,000	8.4	27,800,000	3.6
World total (2016)	151,600,000	9.6	72,500,000	4.6
Boys (2020)	97,000,000	11.2	50,200,000	5.8
Girls (2020)	62,900,000	7.8	28,800,000	3.6
World total (2020)	160,000,000	9.6	79,000,000	4.7

== Potential positives ==
The term child labour can be misleading when it confuses harmful work with employment that may be beneficial to children. It can also ignore harmful work outside employment and any benefits children normally derive from their work. Domestic work is an example: all families but the rich must work at cleaning, cooking, caring, and more to maintain their homes. In most families in the world, this process extends to productive activities, especially herding and various types of agriculture, and to a variety of small family businesses. Where trading is a significant feature of social life, children can start trading in small items at an early age, often in the company of family members or of peers.

Work is undertaken from an early age by vast numbers of children in the world and may have a natural place in growing up. Work can contribute to the well-being of children in a variety of ways; children often choose to work to improve their lives, both in the short- and long-term. At the material level, children's work often contributes to producing food or earning income that benefits themselves and their families; and such income is especially important when the families are poor. Work can provide an escape from debilitating poverty, sometimes by allowing a young person to move away from an impoverished environment. Young people often enjoy their work, especially paid work, or when work involves the company of peers. Even when work is intensive and enforced, children often find ways to combine their work with play.

While full-time work hinders schooling, empirical evidence is varied on the relationship between part-time work and school. Sometimes even part-time work may hinder school attendance or performance. On the other hand, many poor children work for resources to attend school. Children who are not doing well at school sometimes seek more satisfactory experience in work. Good relations with a supervisor at work can provide relief from tensions that children feel at school and home. In the modern world, school education has become so central to society that schoolwork has become the dominant work for most children, often replacing participation in productive work. If school curricula or quality do not provide children with appropriate skills for available jobs or if children do not have the aptitude for schoolwork, school may impede the learning of skills, such as agriculture, which will become necessary for future livelihood.

== In media ==
- Letitia Elizabeth Landon addresses this issue in scathing terms in her poem The Factory. (1835). 'Tis an accursed thing!—she writes.
- Oliver Twist, a novel by Charles Dickens that was later adapted into films and into a theater production.
- "The Little Match Girl", a short story by Hans Christian Andersen that was later adapted into films and other media.
- Gunjal, a film by Shoaib Sultan based on the child labour activist Iqbal Masih's murder.

== See also ==
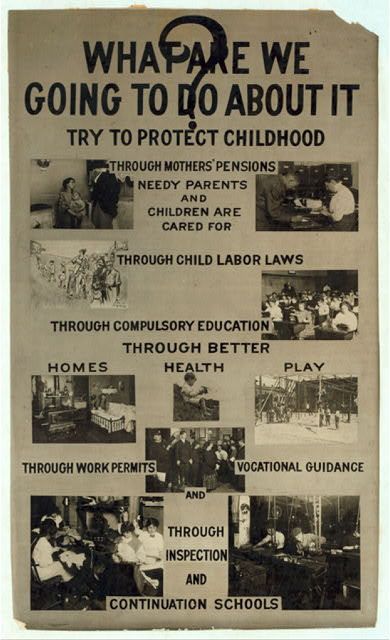
Lewis Hine used photography to help bring attention to child labour in the United States. He created this poster in 1914 with an appeal about child labour.

- Child abuse
- Child labour in Africa
- Child labour in Bangladesh
- Child labour in India
- Child migration
- Child prostitution
- Child work in indigenous American cultures
- Children's rights
- Children in cocoa production
- Children's rights movement
- Concerned for Working Children
- Ethical consumerism
- History of childhood
- International Programme on the Elimination of Child Labour, IPEC
- International Research on Working Children
- Kinder der Landstrasse, Switzerland
- Legal working age
- London matchgirls strike of 1888
- Newsboys strike of 1899, successful strike in New York
- Street children
- Trafficking of children
- World Day Against Child Labour
- Child slavery

International conventions and other instruments:

- ILO Forced Labour Convention, 1930 (No. 29)
- ILO Abolition of Forced Labour Convention, 1957 (No. 105)
- ILO Minimum Age Convention, 1973 (No. 138)
- ILO Worst Forms of Child Labour Convention, 1999 (No. 182)
