= Spazzacamini =

Italian and Swiss child laborers

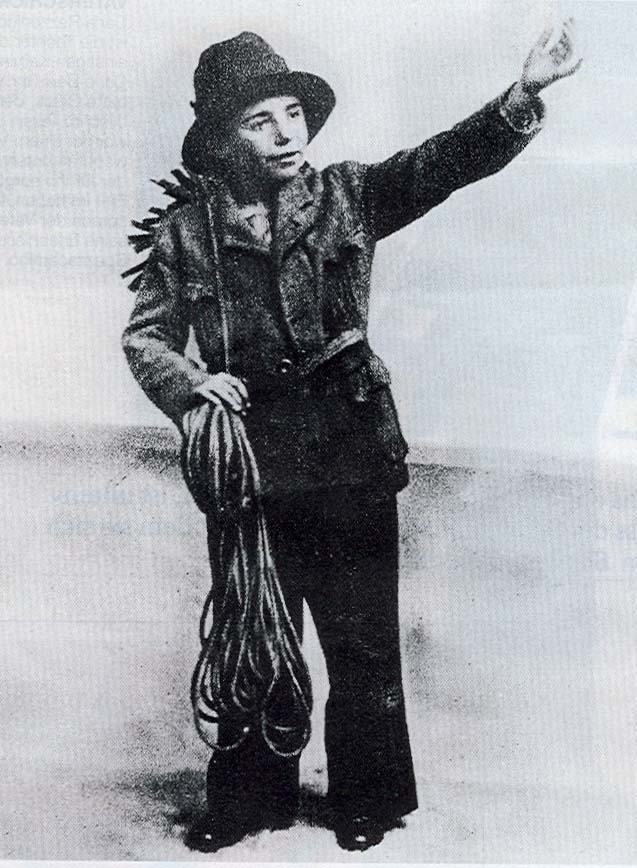
Spazzacamino (singular), late 19th century, Museo Sonogno

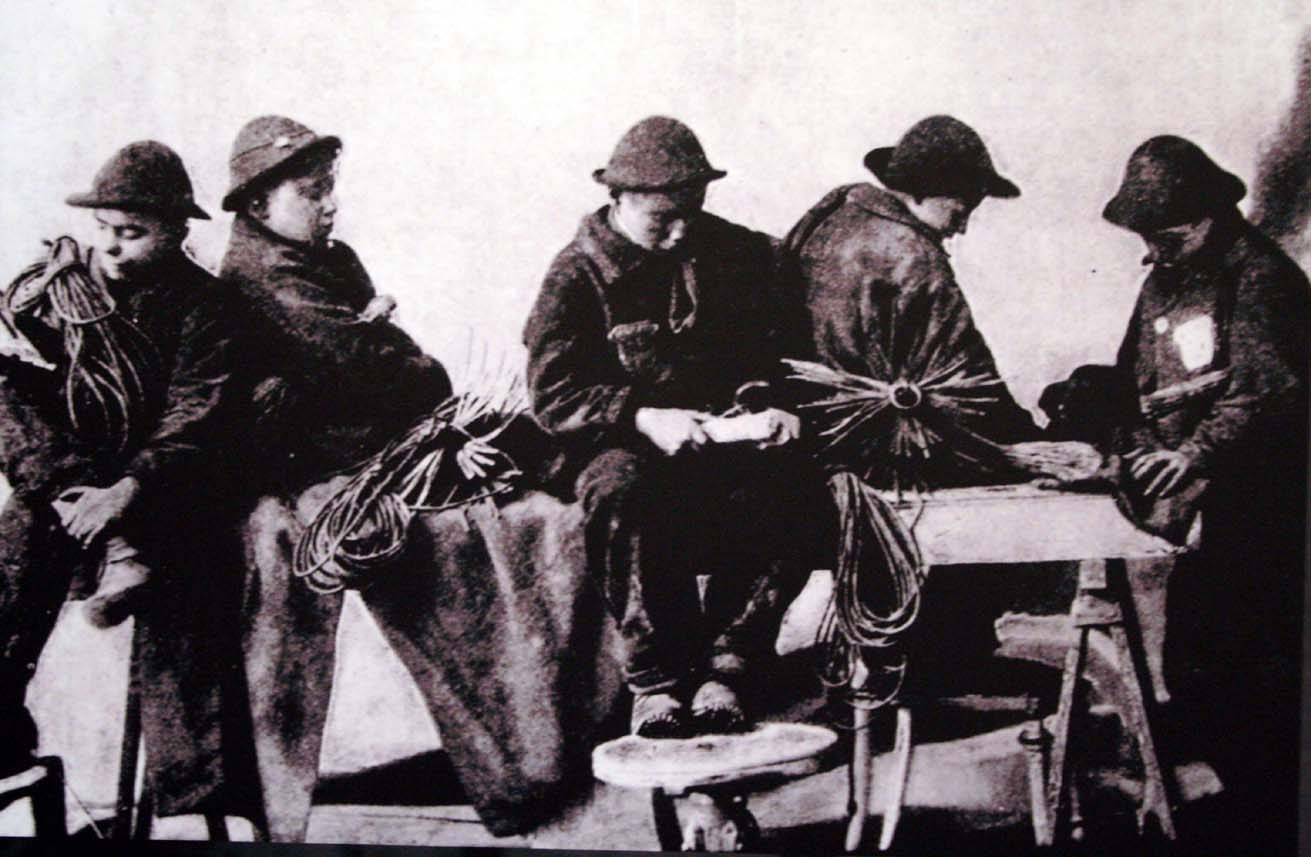
Spazzacamini (plural) in Milano, late 19th century, Museo Sonogno

Spazzacamini (Italian for chimney sweep) was the term for child laborers in 19th-to-early-20th-century Italy and Switzerland, where they were also known as Kaminfegerkinder in German-speaking areas.

== History and origin ==
The boys, usually 8 to 12 years old, were mostly from the Canton of Ticino, coveted by their padroni chimney sweepers because they were small and slim and so could climb the narrow chimneys and to clean them. When the boys had reached the top of the chimneys, they had to shout Spazzacamini! to prove that they actually had climbed up the dark, stuffy fireplaces.

Working conditions were catastrophic. For lunch, the children often had nothing to eat and had to go begging for bread, and they had often to sleep in stables. The boys were hired in the winter so that at the family tables in the badly developed valleys of Ticino,one mouth less had to be fed. Bitter poverty and hunger were then widespread in Ticino during the winter. Many children came from the Valle Verzasca, the Cento Valli and also from the Italian Val Vigezzo valleys and frequently worked in northern Italy.

== In culture ==
Every autumn in Vigezzo, chimney sweeps from all over the world meet in memory of the chimney sweep child slaves. The children's book Die schwarzen Brüder ("The Black Brothers") was first published in two volumes in 1940–41, telling the story of Giorgio, a little boy from Sonogno in the Verzasca Valley, based on facts, who had been used as Kaminfegerjunge. Lisa Tetzner had read in ancient chronicles about the fate of such small boys from the Verzasca Valley and other valleys of the Ticino. The book is popular and inspired a film, a television serial, a musical and a radio play. As well, a hiking route starting in Sonogno in the Verzasca Valley got its name.

== Literature ==
- Elisabeth Wenger: Als lebender Besen im Kamin: Einer vergessenen Vergangenheit auf der Spur. Books on demand, 2010.
- Lisa Tetzner and Kurt Kläber: Die Schwarzen Brüder. Erlebnisse und Abenteuer eines kleinen Tessiners. First published in 1940–41, Sauerländer, Aarau/Mannheim 2010, ISBN 978-3-7941-8104-9.
- Lisa Tetzner and Hannes Binder (illustrations): Die Schwarzen Brüder – Roman in Bildern. Patmos Verlagshaus, Düsseldorf 2002, ISBN 978-3-7941-4900-1.

== See also ==
- Child labour in Switzerland
- Chimney sweeps' carcinoma
- Die schwarzen Brüder
- Kinder der Landstrasse
- Verdingkinder
- Wiedergutmachungsinitiative
