= Huser family =

Swiss Yenish musical family from the 18th-21st centuries

The Huser family is a Yenish musical family from Switzerland, first mentioned in historical records in 1737 in the canton of Obwalden. The family became Swiss citizens of Magliaso in the 19th century and achieved prominence in the 20th century as folk musicians, particularly through the musical group known as the Wandervögel and later as the Huserbuebe. The family's history illustrates the challenges faced by Yenish people in obtaining citizenship and the persecution they endured during the 20th century.

== Early history and citizenship struggles ==
The Huser family's documented history begins with Josef Ludwig Remigius Huser (1757-1836), who was baptized in 1757 in Stans. His baptismal certificate bore the notation "vagi" (vagabond), indicating he was the son of parents without fixed residence. His father, Franz Josef Eustachius Huser (1737-1799), obtained provisional residence permission in Stans in 1799, which Nidwalden revoked in 1803 following the dissolution of the Helvetic Republic.

Josef Ludwig Remigius Huser, his second wife Elisabeth née Dietrich (1787-1868), and their descendants worked as itinerant pottery merchants, traveling between Piedmont, Lombardy, France, Aargau, and the canton of Zürich. Like other Yenish families, they married in Catholic communities that permitted unions without requiring proof of origin, circumventing marriage impediments. In 1836, the couple's eldest son, Josef Leodegar Huser (born 1813 or 1816), married Anna Maria Kiwiler (born 1813) in Magliaso.

Josef Leodegar Huser persistently sought citizenship rights in the cantons of Obwalden and Nidwalden. In 1842 and 1843, two intercantonal arbitration tribunals convened by the Federal Diet ruled that the descendants of Franz Josef Eustachius Huser should be granted citizenship in the Ticino, Valais, and Schwyz communities where their marriages or their parents' marriages had been celebrated. These rulings initially went unenforced, leaving family members without citizenship rights (heimatlos). After the establishment of the Swiss federal state, Josef Leodegar and his brother Josef Remigius Balthasar Huser (born 1818) petitioned the new federal government directly for citizenship rights starting in 1856. On orders from Johann Jakob Trachsler, a high-ranking official handling the matter, they and their relatives were arrested and interrogated. In 1859, the Federal Council compelled the canton of Ticino to naturalize the two brothers.

== 20th century persecution and musical career ==
In 1860, Josef Leodegar Huser's family obtained citizenship rights in Magliaso, which had severe consequences in the 20th century. In 1929, the Pro Juventute foundation, led by Federal Councillor Heinrich Häberlin, submitted its first federal subsidy application for its "Kinder der Landstrasse" program, based on racial hygiene theories. The application included a genealogical tree of the Huser family from Magliaso, compiled from numerous 19th-century documents. Family members listed in this genealogy, thus racialized, faced particular persecution. While the municipality of Magliaso cooperated with Pro Juventute, the Central Switzerland cantons where the ancestors originated surrendered far fewer children to Pro Juventute, and Valais, where Josef Leodegar Huser's youngest siblings lived, conducted no removals of Yenish children from their families.

Franz Friedrich Huser (1895-1953), grandson of Josef Leodegar, and his wife Frieda née Storrer (1896-1980) successfully saved their children from Pro Juventute's reach by fleeing the canton of Zürich in 1929, where the older children were attending school. In Ticino, they earned their living through peddling and playing music in a family orchestra. Returning to German-speaking Switzerland in 1932, they became known in the Swiss folk music scene as the Wandervögel ("migratory birds"). The ensemble included the father on schwyzerörgeli (diatonic button accordion), the mother on double bass, yodeling, and vocals, and their children: Franz (1916-1992) on clarinet and saxophone, Frieda (1918-2013) on lute and mandoline, Trudy (1919-2012) on lute, mandoline, yodeling, vocals, double bass, and alphorn, and Tony Huser (1921-1990) on accordion, clarinet, and saxophone.

=== The Huserbuebe era ===
Franz and Tony Huser, both merchants by profession, achieved success with their formation called the Huserbuebe ("the Huser boys"). They published hundreds of their own compositions, some of which have entered the Swiss folk music repertoire. Over time, they increasingly performed as a trio with their sister Trudy Huser, touring internationally in the United States, Israel, Taiwan, Japan, Thailand, Saudi Arabia, Portugal, and South America.

== Contemporary developments ==
In the 21st century, Franz Huser's son, entrepreneur Markus Huser (born 1972), continues the Huserbuebe's musical activities in a new configuration. Tony's son, Toni Huser (born 1957), a secondary school teacher and school director, perpetuates the family tradition as a jazz and variety music musician. Writer Isabella Huser (born 1958), Tony Huser's daughter, researched her paternal Yenish family history for her novel Zigeuner (2021). She has served as a member of the Federal Commission against Racism since 2024.

== Archives and sources ==
The family's history is documented in various Swiss archives, including the Swiss Federal Archives in Bern, which contain records of Pro Juventute's "Kinder der Landstrasse" program (1926-1972), police matters, naturalization, citizenship, and stateless persons files (1838-1876), and Pro Juventute Foundation documents (1929-1931). Additional documentation is held in municipal archives of Magliaso, Küssnacht, and Lachen, as well as state archives of Lucerne, Obwalden, Schwyz, St. Gallen, and Zürich.

== Bibliography ==
- Peter, Rico: Dialektmusik. Die Wurzeln unserer eigenen Musik, 1981, pp. 183–196.
- Roth, Ernst: Lexikon der Schweizer Volksmusikanten, 1987, pp. 80–82.
- Glauser, Marianne: "Wenn ich wieder auf die Welt käme, würde ich wieder Musik machen", in: Zeitlupe, 69/4, 1991, pp. 84–88.
- Huser, Isabella: Zigeuner, 2021 (novel).
