= Guido Fluri =

Swiss entrepreneur and philanthropist

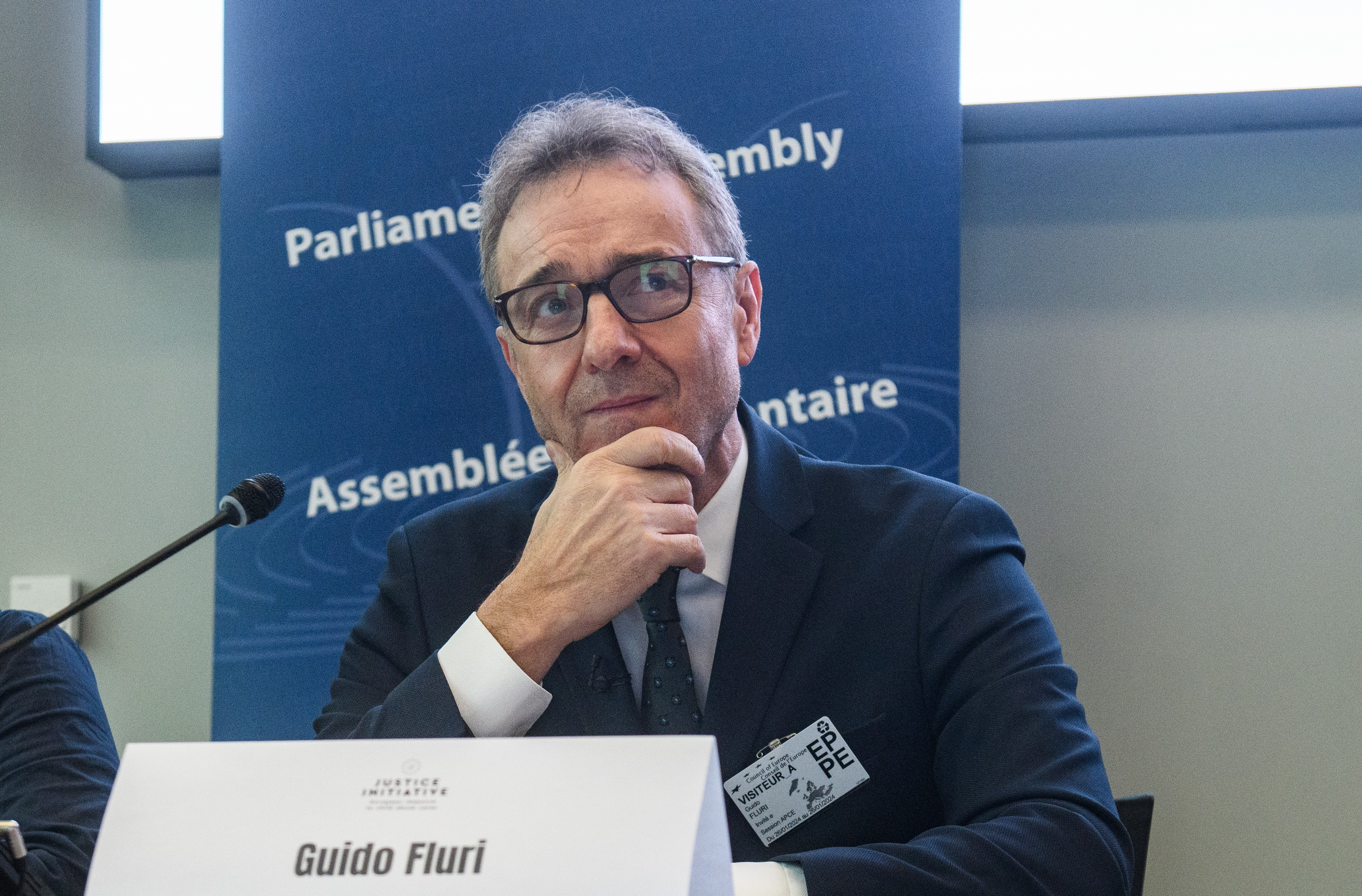
- Guido Fluri at a press conference at the Council of Europe in 2024
- Born: 10 July 1966 (age 59); Olten, Switzerland
- Occupation(s): Entrepreneur, Philanthropist
- Organization(s): Guido Fluri Foundation, Justice Initiative
- Website: guidofluri.ch

Guido Fluri (born July 10, 1966) is a Swiss entrepreneur and philanthropist, known for his advocacy against institutional child abuse. Fluri initiated the Swiss children coercion reparation initiative (Wiedergutmachungsinitiative), which resulted in a federal compensation fund. With the Justice Initiative, he campaigns at the European level.

== Early life ==
Fluri was born as the illegitimate child of a 17-year-old mother who developed schizophrenia shortly after his birth. He was raised by his grandparents and in children's homes. He initially started training as a plumber but dropped out and ended up working as a filling station attendant.

== Entrepreneur and Investor ==
Fluri bought his first piece of land with savings from his work at the gas station and a bank loan, later built a three-family house, and sold it for a profit. He acquired real estate properties at comparatively low prices following the collapse of the Swiss real estate bubble in 1989. After the turn of the millennium, he was able to purchase properties located centrally at lower-than-average market prices.

In 2020, Fluri sold the majority of his real estate holdings to Swiss Life for 360 million Swiss francs. With an estimated net worth of CHF 375 million, he ranked among 300 richest people in Switzerland in 2024.

== Guido Fluri Foundation ==
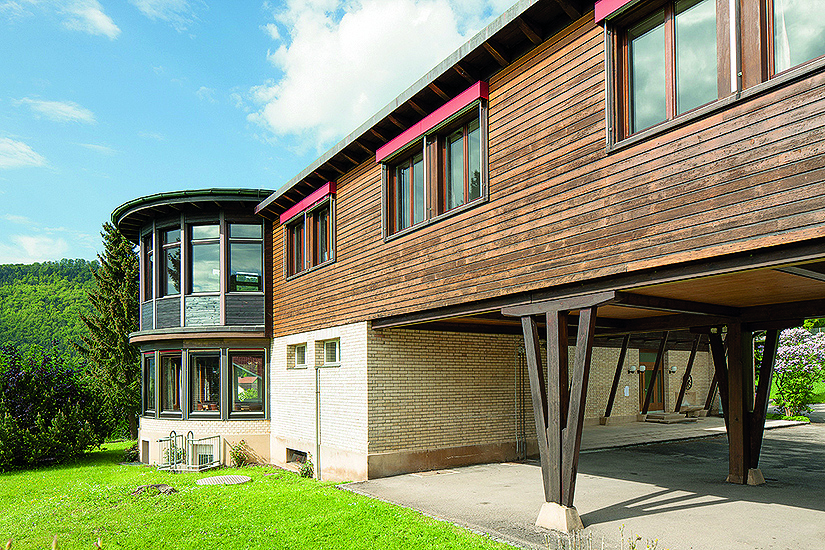
Former children's home in Mümliswil, converted into a memorial site.

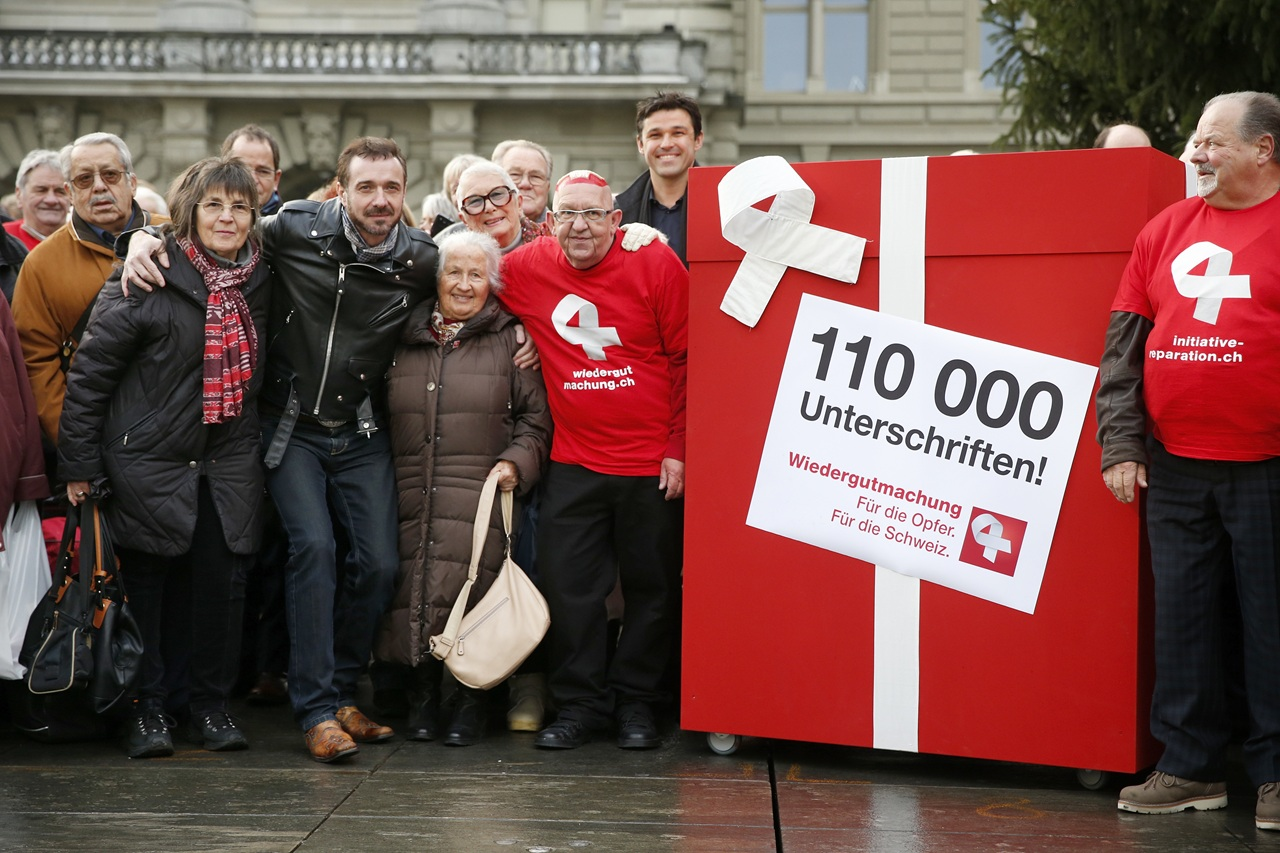
Guido Fluri (front, 2nd from left, with leather jacket) with victims at the submission of signatures for the reparation initiative on Friday, 19 December 2014 in Bern.

In 2010, Fluri established the Guido Fluri Foundation. The foundation, in addition to its work against child abuse, supports people affected by the brain tumor acoustic neuroma and the families of people with schizophrenia.

Since 2010, Fluri has supported efforts towards the historical investigation of child abuse in Switzerland. He launched a project to reappraise Swiss foster homes. In 2011, he purchased a former foster home in Mümliswil, in which he was housed in the early 1970s, and had it converted into a museum.

In 2013, he initiated the Reparation Initiative, a Swiss federal popular initiative to address the fate of forced child labourers in Switzerland, the so-called Verdingkinder, and other victims of compulsory social measures in Switzerland. The initiative led to a law in 2016, creating a CHF 300 million compensation fund. For his efforts, Fluri was awarded an honorary doctorate from the University of Lucerne in 2018.

Since 2022, he has been funding a professorship at the Pontifical Gregorian University for the prevention of sexual abuse.

== Justice Initiative ==
Since 2022, Fluri has lobbied at the European level through the Justice Initiative. In 2023 they delivered a petition to the European Parliament with 540,000 signatures advocating better child protection online.

In 2024, the Parliamentary Assembly of the Council of Europe in Strasbourg adopted a motion of the Justice Initiative calling for child abuse in Europe to be addressed along the lines of the Swiss Reparation Initiative.
