= Romeo and the Black Brothers =

Japanese anime television series

- Cover of the first volume of the DVD release by Bandai, featuring Romeo
- ロミオの青い空
- Genre: Adventure, drama, historical, romance, slice of life, coming of age
- Based on: The Black Brothers by Lisa Tetzner
- Screenplay by: Michiru Shimada
- Directed by: Kōzō Kusuba
- Music by: Kei Wakakusa
- Country of origin: Japan
- Original language: Japanese
- No. of episodes: 33

Production
- Executive producer: Koichi Motohashi
- Producers: Yoshihiro Suzuki (Fuji TV); Senya Suzuki (Fuji TV); Akio Yogo
- Production companies: Fuji Television; Nippon Animation

Original release
- Network: FNS (Fuji TV)
- Release: January 15 – December 17, 1995

Romeo and the Black Brothers (ロミオの青い空, Romio no aoi sora) also titled as Romeo's Blue Skies is a 1995 Japanese anime series produced by Nippon Animation. Based on the novel Die schwarzen Brüder ("The Black Brothers") by Lisa Tetzner, the series aired from January to December 1995 on Fuji Television and its affiliates as the 21st entry in the World Masterpiece Theater series.

== Plot ==
In 1875, a young boy named Romeo lives in the Swiss village of Sonogno. His family, already struggling with debt, faces further hardship when a drought devastates their crops. A sinister man known as Luini, "The God of Death", arrives in the village, seeking to buy children for labor. After Luini sets fire to the family's last cornfield, leaving Romeo's father blind, Romeo sells himself into servitude as a chimney sweeper for 25 francs to cover medical costs.

On his journey to Milan, Romeo befriends Alfredo, a kind but secretive boy, and other children in similar circumstances. They are locked in a basement and later forced to cross a stormy lake, during which many are presumed dead. Romeo and Alfredo survive, and despite Luini's cruelty, Romeo saves him from drowning. Upon arrival in Milan, the boys are separated and sold to different masters. Romeo's new employer, Marcello Rossi, is kind but controlled by his harsh wife, Edda. Their sickly daughter, Angeletta, befriends Romeo, and he also gains an education from Professor Casella.

Romeo forms a resistance group called the Black Brothers to stand up against a street gang, the Wolf Pack, led by Giovanni. After a series of conflicts, the Black Brothers defeat the Wolf Pack, earning Giovanni's respect. Meanwhile, Angeletta is revealed to be the granddaughter of Lady Isabella Montgomery, a noblewoman who initially rejects her but later takes her to Paris for medical treatment.

Alfredo is revealed to be from the noble Martini family. Both he and his younger sister were framed for their parents' deaths by their Uncle Mauricio and Aunt Grazela, who now seek royal favor. When Romeo discovers Alfredo's sister, Bianca being held hostage by their Aunt and Uncle he and the Black Brothers help her escape captivity, reunite her with Alfredo and clear their names. However, Alfredo, suffering from tuberculosis, collapses. Before dying in Romeo's arms, he entrusts him with caring for Bianca and fulfilling his dreams.

Romeo struggles with grief but is helped by his friends to move forward. He organizes a funeral for Alfredo and becomes the new leader of the Black Brothers. Over time, he decides to pursue education and help others, while Bianca aspires to become a nurse. In 1876, after his six-month contract ends, Romeo returns to Sonogno, reuniting with his family.

Ten years later, in 1886, Romeo has fulfilled his dream of becoming a teacher. He marries Bianca, and they name their son Alfredo in honor of his best friend.

== Characters ==
Romeo (ロミオ)
Voiced by Ai Orikasa (Japanese) / Louie Paraboles (Filipino)
A young, optimistic boy who often courageously helps those around him without self-regard. Originally named "Giorgio" in the novel Die schwarzen Brüder, he grew up to a loving family in Sonogno, a small village in Switzerland which is located near the Italian border. His father Roberto is a farmer, while his mother Jessica is a housewife. His biological father was killed in the war when he was young, but it is not known. Romeo has twin brothers: Carlo and Pietro. He also has a grandmother named Maria and a pet ermine named Piccolo. When Romeo was still a child, he had the job of ringing the church bells every morning in his village. He also used to go fishing with his friends on sunny days. Romeo even helped his father on the jobs in their family's cornfield. A long-standing drought struck Sonogno Village and many families suffered because of this, including Romeo's family. During this time, Luini, "The God of Death", came to the village, searching for boys that he could buy and sell to become chimney sweeps in Milan. Romeo became Luini's interest. The 11-year old Romeo was forced to sell himself to the "God of Death" in order to get a doctor that could treat his father's illness. After Romeo signed a contract with Luini, a doctor from Locarno named Baregi was brought to Sonogno and treated Roberto. Romeo then sadly left his family and embarked on a long journey to Milan. It was during this journey that Romeo first met Alfredo, who saved him from an apple vendor who mistakenly accused him of stealing apples. Together they were sold in Milan by "The God of Death" to their respective bosses. Romeo was bought by Marchelo Rossi. Before Romeo and Alfredo separated, they swore eternal friendship and promised to each other that they would meet again. Romeo experienced many hardships and triumphs while working as a chimney sweep in Milan. He experienced mistreatment by the Rossi family and was bullied by the Wolf Pack gang. Later, Romeo and Alfredo were reunited with each other. During the reunion, Alfredo revealed to Romeo his intention to create a fraternity for chimney sweeps that can help each other in times of need. Together they joined forces with other chimney sweeps in Milan and the Black Brothers were formed. Romeo and the other members of the fraternity chose Alfredo as their first leader. The Black Brothers defeated the Wolf Pack during their fights at San Babila Church and Sempione Park. The greatest triumph of Romeo in Milan happened when he learned to read and write through Professor Casella. With the help of the kind-hearted professor, the then "no read, no write" boy was brought to the world of knowledge. Romeo became knowledgeable in writing and even became fond of reading books like his best friend Alfredo. When Alfredo died of tuberculosis during a cold winter in Milan, Romeo became deeply depressed, but after hearing encouraging words from the Black Brothers and Alfredo's sister Bianca, he managed to accept his beloved best friend's death. Romeo succeeded Alfredo as leader of the Black Brothers. The first thing that he did as leader of the Black Brothers was to start a fundraising for Alfredo's funeral. The fundraising became successful and Alfredo was given a decent funeral. Romeo later finished his working contract in Milan when spring came. He then happily returned to his family in Sonogno Village. Romeo was accompanied by his pet ermine Piccolo during his entire journey to Milan. He was also accompanied during his entire stay in the city mentioned and even when he returned home to Sonogno Village. Ten years after finishing his working contract in Milan, Romeo became a teacher. Romeo and Bianca (Alfredo's sister) were married and they named their first child after Alfredo.
Count Alfredo Martini (アルフレド・マルティーニ)
Voiced by Toshiko Fujita (Japanese) / Gloria de Guzman (Filipino) / Bouthaina Shaya (Arabic)
Romeo's best friend and in the anime series the heir to a large fortune of 12 years old. Alfredo was also the founder and first leader of the Black Brothers. Born into a noble family, he was the only son of the couple Viscount Vittorio and Viscountess Patrizia Martini and the older brother of Bianca. Alfredo loved to read books. He and his sister Bianca grew up at the Martini mansion in Piedmont. Together they enjoyed a happy, peaceful life with their parents until a terrible tragedy struck their family. The siblings' were orphaned by their evil Uncle Maurizio and Aunt Grazela Martini who coveted all the treasures of Vittorio, especially the Martini medal. Their deep enviousness led them to burn the Martini mansion. Alfredo and Bianca's parents were killed during the incident, but before they died, Viscount Vittorio managed to entrust the Martini medal to Alfredo. The siblings escaped from the fire, bringing with them the medal. Maurizio and Grazela hunted the orphaned siblings for the medal. They even put on Alfredo and Bianca's heads the blame for the tragedy in Piedmont, making them wanted by the police. A month after the burning of the Martini mansion, Alfredo and Bianca stumbled across a farm village. During this time, Alfredo's sister was too exhausted to walk, and because of this, they rested along the road. They were later found and rescued by a farmer. After the siblings' rescue, Luini, the "God of Death" appeared in the farm village. Alfredo then decided to sign a contract with Luini and go to Milan to work as a chimney sweep in order to protect Bianca. Alfredo embarked on a long journey to Milan, leaving behind his beloved younger sister in the farm village. It was during his journey to Milan that Alfredo first met Romeo, who at that time was mistakenly accused of stealing apples by a vendor named Tonio. The noble boy saved Romeo by showing and telling Tonio the proofs of Romeo's innocence. Alfredo and Romeo's friendship began then. Together they were sold in Milan by the "God of Death" to their respective bosses. Alfredo was bought by a very cruel man named Citron. Before Alfredo and Romeo separated, they swore eternal friendship and promised to each other that they would meet again. Alfredo experienced starvation and violence while he was living with Citron. There were days that he did not eat because the money that was supposed to be used in buying potatoes was wasted by his boss in buying liquors. There was also an incident where Citron threw a bottle and a plate at him while cleaning the floor in their home. Alfredo and Romeo later reunited. During the reunion, Alfredo revealed to Romeo his intention to create a fraternity for chimney sweeps that can help each other in times of need. They joined forces with other chimney sweeps in Milan and the Black Brothers was formed. All of the members of the alliance chose Alfredo to become their leader. As a leader of the Black Brothers, he was respected and admired by all of his companions for his intelligence and bravery. The Black Brothers victoriously defeated the Wolf Pack in their fights twice. First, at San Babila Church and finally at Sempione Park. The Black Brothers under Alfredo's leadership was also instrumental to Countess Isabella Montovani's acceptance of Angeletta as her granddaughter. Alfredo's sister Bianca was captured by Maurizio and Grazela Martini, and together they went to Milan. Knowing that Alfredo was in Milan and that the Martini medal was with him, the evil couple took Bianca hostage to get the medal from him by force. Romeo and the Black Brothers then saved Bianca from her evil relatives and brought her to San Babila Church, where she was reunited with Alfredo. During the reunion, Alfredo coughed blood and suddenly collapsed. He was brought to Dr. Casella, and the doctor diagnosed that he had tuberculosis. Although the name of the disease was not mentioned to Alfredo, he was still aware about his terrible fate. Sensing that he could die anytime, Alfredo decided to entrust his only sister to Dr. Casella. He even decided to meet with the King of Italy to clear his and Bianca's tarnished names and to reclaim their inheritance. With the help of the Black Brothers, the Wolf Pack and Countess Montovani, the Martini siblings successfully met the king who was attending a banquet during that time. In the end, Alfredo proved to the King of Italy that he was really part of the Martini line by showing his father's medal with a "mark of benediction" from the king's father, Carlo Alberto of Sardinia. The king was also convinced that the Martini siblings truly did not kill their own parents. The following day after the victorious meeting with the King of Italy, Alfredo died of tuberculosis. He died in the arms of his best friend Romeo. His last words were "Take care of Bianca". His death was mourned by all those who love him, especially Bianca, Romeo and the other living members of the Black Brothers. Romeo succeeded his late best friend as leader of the Black Brothers. The first thing that Romeo did as the new leader was to start a fundraising for Alfredo's funeral. The fundraising was successful. Alfredo was given a solemn funeral. Alfredo is the namesake of the son of Romeo and Bianca.
Professor Casella (カセラ)
Voiced by Kinryuu Arimoto
Casella is a teacher and doctor in Milan. He has a large collection of books in his house. Professor Casella is a kind man. He taught Romeo to read and write. The great professor brought the then 11-year old boy to the world of knowledge. In addition to these great deeds, he also took custody of Bianca Martini by the request of the dying Alfredo Martini. Dr. Casella treated Alfredo's younger sister as his real daughter. Every Saturday, the doctor goes to an orphanage and examines children.
The Black Brothers
A group of young chimney sweeps formed by Alfredo and Romeo, they consider each other as family and work together to solve conflict. In front of Alfredo's grave, the Black Brothers and the Wolf Pack made peace with each other.
Members
Dante (ダンテ)
Voiced by Tomoko Ishimura (credited as Mifuyu Hiiragi)
Dante is a funny boy with a huge ego who lives in Locarno. Romeo and Alfredo first met him when Alfredo's bag was stolen. Luini, the "God of Death", also sold Dante to work as a chimney sweep in Milan. He was bought by Matteo, the close friend of Marchelo Rossi. He saved Romeo from a beating by the Wolf Pack gang shortly after Anzelmo framed Romeo for theft and beating him up. Dante is one of the members of the Black Brothers. He develops a crush on Nikita. When spring finally came to Milan, Dante finished his working contract and returned to his hometown of Locarno. He first appeared in episode 4.
Michaelo (ミカエル)
Voiced by Hiromi Ishikawa
Michaelo was one of the boys who was sold by Luini to work as a chimney sweep in Milan. Romeo and Alfredo first met him at a shop called The Wildcat in Locarno. While working as a chimney sweep in Milan, Michaelo joined the Black Brothers. Among the members of the Black Brothers, he is the most nervous and the easiest to fool. Michaelo is also called "crybaby" because he often cries. He first appeared in episode 5.
Antonio (ダンテ)
Voiced by Urara Takano
Antonio first met Romeo and Alfredo at The Wildcat shop in Locarno, where they were detained for a while with Dante and Michaelo. He became a chimney sweep in Milan and joined the Black Brothers while working there. Antonio had a younger brother named Jusette, who worked as a chimney sweep in Milan earlier than him. Jusette failed to finish his working contract in Milan. After almost having no food for a whole month, he was found dead in the snow. Unlike his younger brother, Antonio luckily finished his working contract in Milan when spring came. He first appeared in episode 5.
Augusto (アウグスト)
Voiced by Kousuke Okano
Augusto was a chimney sweep in Milan. He is one of the members of the Black Brothers. Romeo first met him during his search for Alfredo. Augusto told Romeo that Alfredo once saved him from the bullying of the Wolf Pack gang. He first appeared in episode 15.
Paulino (パウリーノ)
Voiced by Megumi Tano
Paulino was a chimney sweep in Milan who was saved by Romeo from the bullying of the Wolf Pack gang. He is one of the members of the Black Brothers. He first appeared in episode 15.
Bartolo (バルトロ)
Voiced by Hiromi Ishikawa
Bartolo is one of the members of the Black Brothers who works as a chimney sweep in Milan.
Giuliano (ジュリアーノ)
Voiced by Mizue Otsuka
Giuliano is one of the members of the Black Brothers who works as a chimney sweep in Milan.
Enrico (エンリコ)
Voiced by Chiko
Enrico was a chimney sweep in Milan. Romeo first met him and Benalibo while searching for Alfredo at Milan's Ceruba Loko street. Enrico is also a member of the Black Brothers. He first appeared in episode 15.
Benalibo Marco (ベナリーボ)
Voiced by Tetsuya Iwanaga
Benalibo was a chimney sweep in Milan. Romeo first met him and Enrico while searching for Alfredo at Milan's Ceruba Loko street. Benalibo told Romeo that Alfredo gave him and Enrico a big potato and a big corn when they starved after having slaved through the night. He also joined the Black Brothers. He first appeared in episode 15.
Luini (ルイニ)
Voiced by Tetsuo Komura
A cruel man who visits towns to buy children. He later sells them as chimney sweeps making large sums of profit. Luini (Antonio Luini in the novel "Die schwarzen Brüder") is the man who is famously known as the "God of Death" or "Salot" in Tagalized Version. He visited different towns and bought young boys including Romeo to sell as chimney sweeps in Milan. Mr. Luini's cruelty went as far as destroying the livelihood of Romeo's family in order to bind the then 11-year old boy under a contract.
Citron (シトロン)
Voiced by Masaharu Satou
Citron was the man who bought Alfredo Martini. He is a gambler and very heavy drinker. Citron is also a cruel and violent man. When Matteo tried to buy Alfredo, Citron drew a blade and pointed it to him. Alfredo experienced cruelty and violence while with his boss. There were days that he did not eat because the money that was supposed to be used in buying potatoes was wasted by his boss in buying liquors. There was also a time when Citron threw a bottle and a plate at Alfredo while the young noble boy was cleaning the floor in their home. Citron's cruelty and violence against Alfredo greatly contributed to the early death of the beloved leader of the Black Brothers.
Countess Bianca Martini (ビアンカ・マルティーニ)
Voiced by Akemi Okamura
Alfredo's younger sister and only daughter of the couple Viscount Vittorio and Viscountess Patrizia Martini. She is a tomboy whose talents are dancing and playing the piano. Bianca and her big brother grew up at the Martini mansion in Piedmont. They enjoyed a happy, peaceful life with their parents until a great tragedy struck their family. Maurizio and Grazela Martini, the siblings' evil uncle and aunt who coveted all the treasures of Viscount Vittorio (especially the Martini medal), burned the Martini mansion. Bianca and Alfredo managed to escape with the Martini medal during the fire, while their parents were burned to death. Maurizio and Grazela hunted the orphaned siblings for the Martini medal. They even put the blame for the fire incident on Bianca and Alfredo's heads, making the siblings wanted by police. Bianca told Alfredo to cut her long, curly, blonde hair because of these reasons, hoping she would not be recognized by Maurizio and Grazela. A month after the tragedy in Piedmont, Bianca and Alfredo stumbled across a farm village. During this time, Bianca could no longer walk due to exhaustion. A farmer saw the siblings resting along the road and rescued them. Soon, Luini, "The God of Death", appeared in the farm village. In order to protect Bianca, Alfredo decided to sign a contract with Luini and go to Milan to work as a chimney sweep. Bianca was left behind in the farm village. Soon after Alfredo went to Milan, Bianca was captured by Maurizio and Grazela. Knowing that Alfredo was in Milan and the Martini medal was with him, the evil couple took Bianca hostage to forcefully get the medal from him. Bianca then was saved by Romeo and the majority of the Black Brothers from the hostage-takers. Later, she was brought to San Babila Church to be reunited with her older brother Alfredo, who at that time was already suffering from tuberculosis. After the Martini siblings were reunited, Bianca became a special member of the Black Brothers. Bianca and Alfredo victoriously cleared their tarnished names and reclaimed their inheritance on the day that they met with the King of Italy. The king was convinced that the Martini siblings truly did not murder their own parents. The following day after the meeting with the King of Italy, Alfredo died. During the period of mourning for Alfredo, Bianca went to Romeo, who became depressed because of what happened. She said comforting and encouraging words to Romeo and even hugged him. After hearing from Bianca, Romeo gained the strength to accept Alfredo's death and the request of his fellow Black Brothers to become their new leader. Before Alfredo died, Bianca was entrusted to Dr. Casella. The kind-hearted doctor and professor took custody of Alfredo's younger sister and treated her like his own daughter. Bianca became Dr. Casella's "little nurse". Ten years later, when Bianca finally became an adult, she married Romeo. They have a child who is named after Alfredo.
Vittorio Martini (ヴィットリオ・マティーニ)
Voiced by Kazuhiko Kishino
Viscount Vittorio Martini was the father of Alfredo and Bianca. His wife was Viscountess Patrizia Martini. A noble man from Piedmont region of Italy, he was an army officer during his younger days. Vittorio was one of the soldiers who fought against the Austrian army at Custoza. It was during the battle at Custoza that Vittorio risked his own life for the sake of Carlo Alberto, the King of Sardinia. The life of the King of Sardinia was saved and the Austrian army was defeated in the battle because of that heroic act. In recognition of Vittorio's heroism, Carlo Alberto gave Viscount Martini a medal with a "mark of benediction". The medal is a precious treasure of the Martini family. It became a lifelong source of pride for Vittorio. It also became a cause of great tragedy to the Martini family. Vittorio's younger brother Maurizio and his wife Grazela coveted all the treasures of the viscount, especially the medal. Because of this, the evil couple burned the Martini mansion, killing Viscount Vittorio and his wife Viscountess Patrizia. Before the viscount and his wife were burned to death, the precious Martini medal was entrusted to Alfredo.
Patrizia Martini (パトリツィア・マティーニ)
Voiced by Sanae Takagi
Viscountess Patrizia Martini was the mother of Alfredo and Bianca. She was also the wife of Viscount Vittorio Martini of Piedmont. Patrizia and her husband died after the Martini mansion was burned by Maurizio and Grazela Martini. They were survived by their children, Alfredo and Bianca.
Maurizio Martini (マウリッツィオ・マルティーニ)
Voiced by Nakata Kazuhiro
Maurizio is the husband of Grazela. He is also the evil younger brother of Viscount Vittorio Martini and uncle of the siblings Alfredo and Bianca. Maurizio and Grazela extremely envy the viscount. They coveted all the wealth of Viscount Vittorio, especially the Martini medal. Their deep enviousness led them to burn the Martini mansion in Piedmont. Viscount Vittorio and his wife Viscountess Patrizia were killed during the incident. Alfredo and Bianca managed to escape from their burning mansion with the Martini medal. The evil couple hunted the siblings for the medal. They even put on Alfredo and Bianca's heads the blame for the tragedy in the Martini mansion. After Alfredo sold himself to work in Milan, Maurizio and Grazela captured Bianca. Knowing that Alfredo was in Milan and the Martini medal was with him, they made Bianca a hostage to forcefully get the medal from him. Romeo and the majority of the Black Brothers then saved Bianca from the evil couple. Bianca was later reunited with her brother Alfredo. Maurizio and Grazela failed to get the Martini medal from Alfredo, but they still did not give up on their evil plans. Before the evil couple went to a banquet that was attended by the King of Italy, Maurizio hired a man to create a replica of the Martini medal. The fake medal was finished and Maurizio wore it on the day of the banquet, hoping he and his wife will not get caught as impostors. Upon learning about the presence of Alfredo and Bianca in the banquet, Maurizio and his bodyguards tried to eliminate the siblings, but with the help of the Black Brothers, Wolf Pack, and Countess Isabella Montovani, the siblings were saved. Accompanied by Countess Montovani, Alfredo and Bianca met with the King of Italy and faced off with their evil relatives. While they were all in front of the king, Alfredo told the king that Maurizio's medal is a fake and that the one he holds is real. To see who is the "low-down skunk up to his neck in lies", the King of Italy examined the two Martini medals. Later, the king found out that Maurizio's medal is truly fake because there is no "mark of benediction" in its back and that Alfredo's medal is the one with a "mark of benediction". The evil couple were caught as impostors and taken away in disgrace. In the end, Maurizio and Grazela did not get all that they wanted, Alfredo and Bianca victoriously cleared their tarnished names and reclaimed their inheritance.
Grazela Martini (グラゼーラ・マルティーニ)
Voiced by Soumi Yoko
Grazela is the wife of Maurizio Martini and sister-in-law of the couple Viscount Vittorio Martini and Viscountess Patrizia Martini. She is also the evil aunt of the siblings Alfredo and Bianca (and the more evil of her and Maurizio). Grazela and her husband extremely envy Viscount Vittorio Martini. They coveted all the treasures of the viscount, especially the Martini medal. Their deep enviousness led them to burn the Martini mansion in Piedmont, killing Viscount Vittorio and his wife. During this time, Alfredo and Bianca managed to escape from their burning mansion with the Martini medal. Maurizio and Grazela hunted the siblings for the medal. They even put on Alfredo and Bianca's heads the blame for the tragedy in the Martini mansion. After Alfredo sold himself to work in Milan, Grazela and Maurizio captured Bianca. Knowing that Alfredo was in Milan and that the Martini medal was with him, they took Bianca hostage to forcefully get the medal from him. Romeo and the majority of the Black Brothers then saved Bianca from the evil couple. Bianca was later reunited with her brother Alfredo. Grazela and Maurizio failed to get the Martini medal from Alfredo, but they still did not give up on their evil deeds. Before the evil couple went to a banquet attended by the King of Italy, Grazela's husband Maurizio hired a man to create a copy of the Martini medal. The fake medal was finished and the evil couple brought it with them to the banquet, hoping they will not get caught as impostors. The siblings Alfredo and Bianca also managed to go to the banquet with the help of the Black Brothers, Wolf Pack, and Countess Isabella Montovani. Accompanied by Countess Montovani, the siblings met with the King of Italy and faced off with their evil relatives. While they were all in front of the king, Alfredo told the king that the Martini medal which was brought by Grazela and Maurizio is a fake and that the one that he holds is the real one. To know who is the liar, the King of Italy examined the two Martini medals. Later, the king found out that the evil couple's medal is really fake and that the medal from Alfredo is the real one because of the "mark of benediction" in its back. Grazela then tried one last effort to fool the king by trying to make it appear that Alfredo swapped the medals, but because she and Maurizio did not originally know about the "mark of benediction" she was unable to convince the king. The evil couple were therefore caught as impostors and taken away in disgrace. In the end, Grazela and Maurizio did not get all that they wanted, Alfredo and Bianca successfully cleared their tarnished names and reclaimed their inheritance.
Piccolo (ピッコロ)
Romeo's pet ermine, who strangely retains its winter coat throughout the series.
Marchelo Rossi (マルチェロ・ロッシ)
Voiced by Masahiro Anzai
Romeo's boss, who bought him. Marchelo Rossi, commonly known just by his surname Rossi, was the man who bought Romeo from Luini, the "God of Death". He is a heavy drinker. Marchelo used to be easily manipulated by his selfish, bossy, fat wife Edda, but later he gained the courage to speak out his mind and do everything that he thinks is right. He did everything that he could to make Romeo's life easier in Milan. Romeo considers Rossi as his second father. Marchelo has one son, Anzelmo, and one foster daughter, Angeletta, the granddaughter of Countess Isabella Montovani. Angeletta was entrusted to Marchelo by Lady Isabella when she was still an infant. He took care of Angeletta until the countess finally accepted her granddaughter. He first appeared in episode 7.
Edda Rossi (エッダ・ロッシ)
Voiced by Yasuko Hatori
Edda is the bossy, selfish, fat wife of Marchelo Rossi, the man who bought Romeo. She is also the mother of Anzelmo and foster mother of Angeletta. Edda used to hate Romeo, and because of that, she and her son mistreated Romeo. Edda even reached to the point that she wanted Romeo to be imprisoned, although Angeletta had confessed to her and Marchelo that Anzelmo was the one who really stole their money. In the last episode, Edda cried when Romeo bid the Rossi couple goodbye after finishing his working contract in Milan. She somehow realized that Romeo became a great help to the Rossi family. She first appeared in episode 7.
Countess Angeletta Montovani (アンジェレッタ・モントバーニ)
Voiced by Maria Kawamura
Angeletta is a beautiful girl who lives with Rossi and is the granddaughter of the "Ice Queen", Countess Isabella Montovani. Her father, Count Adolfo Montovani, was the only son of the countess, while her mother, Giovanna, was a commoner. Both of her parents died without being personally recognized by her. When Angeletta was still a baby, she was entrusted by Lady Isabella to Marchelo Rossi. She was not accepted by her grandmother at that time, due to her dislike towards her mother and her belief that Angeletta would come after the Montovani estate. She first appeared in episode 7 when she first saw Romeo being led by Rossi to a cell which was later destroyed and built to a bed in episode 14. Angeletta was raised by her foster parents, Marchelo and Edda. Unlike her foster parents' real child, Anzelmo, she is an extremely kind person. Angeletta is also great in drawing and writing journals. It was proven through her sketchbook and diary. She was suffering from a serious heart illness for a long time and was unable to leave her bed, and is thus usually left alone in her room. Romeo and Angeletta became very close friends. Angeletta was nicknamed by Romeo as his "Angel". Romeo and the rest of the Black Brothers helped the "Angel" to get accepted by her grandmother. They successfully convinced the "Ice Queen" that Angeletta is not after the Montovani estate. Countess Montovani then took custody of her granddaughter. She brought Angeletta to Paris to be treated for her heart illness. Romeo and Angeletta had already developed feelings for each other before they separated. Angeletta is named "Angelita" in the Tagalog dub. Angeletta's fate is unknown and she never appears again after her departure to Paris, but Romeo mentions her at one point upon wondering how she was getting on with her treatment. Countess Montovani also appears a few episodes later and mentions that Angeletta remained in Paris.
Countess Isabella Montovani (イザベラ・モントバーニ)
Voiced by Nana Yamaguchi
Countess Isabella Montovani is the grandmother of Angeletta. Her son, Count Adolfo, who fell in love with a commoner named Giovanna, was Angeletta's biological father. She used to be called "Ice Queen" because she used to have a cold personality and she had a strong dislike towards Giovanna, due to her not being nobility and would not approve of her being Adolfo's wife, which later forced Adolfo to leave the mansion with Giovanna and Angeletta. Following the deaths of Adolfo and Giovanna Lady Isabella entrusted the infant Angeletta to Marchelo Rossi during an unseasonable springtime snowfall. She became the benefactor of Angeletta during her entire years with Rossi's family. It took several years before the countess accepted her granddaughter. Lady Isabella would not let go of her dislike towards Angeletta's mother and she also used to believe that Angeletta was only after the Montovani estate, but with the help of Romeo and the rest of the members of the Black Brothers, she was enlightened. In the end, Countess Montovani took custody of Angeletta. She brought her granddaughter to Paris to be treated for her serious heart illness. She reappears later to help the siblings Alfredo and Bianca Martini reclaim their inheritance and clear their tarnished names. She also attended Alfredo Martini's funeral.
Adolfo Montovani (アドルフォ・モントバーニ)
Voiced by Toshiyuki Morikawa & Sara Nakayama
Lord Adolfo was the only son of Countess Isabella Montovani. He fell in love with Giovanna, a beautiful commoner and they bore a child together. Their child is Angeletta. Adolfo welcomed Giovanna and Baby Angeletta to the Montovani mansion, but Lady Isabella gave her disapproval because Giovanna was not from nobility and the honor of Adolfo's name was important for her. This forced Adolfo and his wife to leave the mansion with the infant Angeletta. After leaving the Montovani mansion, Adolfo and Giovanna became ill and died without being personally recognized by Angeletta.
Giovanni (ジョバンニ)
Voiced by Nobuyuki Hiyama
Giovanni is the leader of the Wolf Pack gang who consider themselves rivals of the Black Brothers. Despite his tough nature, he is fair when it comes to fighting. This was proven when Giovanni and his companions fought with the Black Brothers. Before their fight began, he told everybody that using any kind of weapon is not allowed. But Tachioni, one of the members of the Wolf Pack, disobeyed. He drew a blade and tried to kill Romeo. Because of this, Giovanni accepted the defeat of the Wolf Pack gang in their fight against the Black Brothers. He also does not fight the sick, as when he stopped himself from attacking Alfredo when he found out that the latter was ill from tuberculosis, the same that killed Giovanni's father. Later on in the series, Giovanni and his companions became more supportive for the Black Brothers. In the last episode of the anime, Giovanni and the rest of the members of the Wolf Pack gang decided to make peace with the Black Brothers. He first appeared in episode 10.
Nikita (ニキータ)
Voiced by Aya Ishizu
A tough, red-haired girl who is a member of Giovanni's gang. Although starting off as an enemy of the Black Brothers, she gradually adopts a more friendly attitude towards them, largely because she develops a crush on Alfredo. Nikita is the tomboy member of the Wolf Pack gang who develops a crush on Alfredo. At first, Romeo and the rest of the Black Brothers did not know that she is a girl, except Alfredo who revealed her secret after the Wolf Pack gang lost in their battle at San Babila Church. Dante develops a crush on her after he knew that she is a girl. Nikita became more friendly to Alfredo, Romeo, and the other members of the Black Brothers in later episodes of the anime series. She first appeared in episode 7. She was deeply saddened by the death of Alfredo. In order to recover from her depression, she swam in a river even though she knew that it was very cold because of the winter season in Milan. Before Alfredo died, he told Nikita to put a flower in her hair and that he will come running to see if she did. In the last episode of the anime, Nikita is shown wearing a flower in her hair. Before Romeo returned home to Sonogno, Nikita promised to him that she will take care of Alfredo's grave.
Anzelmo Rossi (アンゼルモ・ロッシ)
Voiced by Tsutomu Kashiwakura
Son of Rossi, he uses trick to stay in the Wolf Pack, including a made-up story claiming he was from Russian royalty. He is finally discovered and beaten up by his old comrades. He takes revenge by framing Romeo for theft and beating him up. He first appeared in episode 7.
Rinaldo (リナルド)
Voiced by Shigeru Nakahara
Rinaldo is a member of the Wolf Pack gang. Nicknamed "Red" because of his red hair, he is intelligent and strong at fighting. At the end of the story, he agrees to defend the chimney sweeps. He first appeared in episode 10.
Tachioni (タチオーニ)
Voiced by Shinichiro Ohta
Tachioni is a member of the Wolf Pack gang. Nicknamed "The Bull", he is violent, brutal, mean, impulsive and he hated Romeo to the point of trying to kill him during a fight. He seems to have changed at the end of the story and no longer hates Romeo. He first appeared in episode 10.
Leo (リオ)
Voiced by Tomoko Maruo
Leo is one of the members of the Wolf Pack gang. Nicknamed "The Louse", he is the smallest among the members of the gang. In the Italian dub "Spicchi di Cielo tra Baffi di Fumo" and the Tagalog dub "Mga Munting Pangarap ni Romeo", he is named Rio. He first appeared in episode 10.
Faustino (ファウスティーノ)
Voiced by Kujira
Faustino is one of the members of the Wolf Pack gang. Among the members of the gang, he is the biggest. He first appeared in episode 10.

== Production ==
The staff noted a lot of challenges throughout production in later interviews. It was originally supposed to have more episodes, but due to low ratings and other network issues, the amount was cut down.

In interviews in the 90s and early 2000s, the director, script writer, and voice actors acknowledged the common interpretation that Romeo and Alfredo are more than just friends multiple times without confirming or denying it.

Later, in a special interview with the director, Kouzo Kusuba, from the 2010 Word Masterpiece Theater Series Memorial Book: Europe Edition, he confirmed that the relationship between Romeo and Alfredo was intended to be romantic. He specifically used the word 恋 (koi) to describe their love, a term that is used exclusively for romantic love in Japanese.

His full comments on their relationship, translated:

Romeo and Alfredo, the two had fallen in love ...

With Romeo and Alfredo, that was love at first sight. Without even going into male friendships, the two are lovers. Before they start walking down the road of hardships, when they meet during the apple incident, it was love at first sight. They fell in love. That is the only explanation for having a bond that is that strong.

== Release and legacy ==
The series was translated into several languages and screened in many countries. It is known in Arabic as "عهد الأصدقاء" (literally "Friends' Covenant"), in the Philippines as "Mga Munting Pangarap ni Romeo" (literally "Romeo's Simple Dreams"), and in Greece as "Τα Παιδιά των Καπνοδόχων" (literally "The Children of the Chimneys").

The series keeps being popular in Japan in the 2020s. In 2020, a new nostalgia merch line was launched for World Masterpiece Theater, headed by Romeo and the Black Brothers merch. The original character designer and animation director, Yoshiharu Sato, provided new artwork for it. In 2022, the series received a stage musical adaptation in Japan which was performed at Ikebukuro's Brilla HALL from March 30 to April 3. A recording of the production and behind-the-scenes footage was later released on Blu-Ray.

== Episodes ==
No.	Title	Original release date
1	"In the Alps! A Crisis of a Small Village"; Transliteration: "Arupusu! Chiisana Mura no Daijiken" (Japanese: アルプス! 小さな村の大事件)	15 January 1995
2	"Destiny's Beginnings: The Family Within the Flames"; Transliteration: "Unmei no Hajimari: Honō no Naka no Kazoku" (Japanese: 運命のはじまり・炎の中の家族)	22 January 1995
3	"Farewell, My Village"; Transliteration: "Sayonara Boku no Mura" (Japanese: さよなら・ぼくの村)	29 January 1995
4	"The Boy on the Poster"; Transliteration: "Nigaoe no Shōnen" (Japanese: 似顔絵の少年)	5 February 1995
5	"A Night in the Tavern"; Transliteration: "Sakaba de no Ichiya" (Japanese: 酒場での一夜)	12 February 1995
6	"The Ship Sinks: Friendship Within the Storm"; Transliteration: "Fune ga Shizumu!! Arashi no Naka no Yūjō" (Japanese: 舟が沈む!! 嵐の中の友情)	19 February 1995
7	"An Angel's Abode"; Transliteration: "Tenshi no Sumu Ie" (Japanese: 天使の住む家)	26 February 1995
8	"A Gift from an Angel"; Transliteration: "Tenshi kara no Okurimono" (Japanese: 天使からの贈り物)	5 March 1995
9	"A Love Letter, By Moonlight"; Transliteration: "Tsukiyo no Rabu Retā" (Japanese: 月夜のラブレター)	12 March 1995
10	"The Blue-Sky Sketchbook"; Transliteration: "Aozora no Suketchibukku" (Japanese: 青空のスケッチブック)	19 March 1995
11	"Let's Be Friends"; Transliteration: "Tomodachi ni Narō" (Japanese: 友だちになろう!)	23 April 1995
12	"To Vanish into the City of Mists"; Transliteration: "Kiri no Machi ni Kieru" (Japanese: 霧の街に消える)	30 April 1995
13	"Reunion in the Sewer"; Transliteration: "Chikasuidō de no Saikai" (Japanese: 地下水道での再会)	7 May 1995
14	"Escape, Quickly!"; Transliteration: "Nigerunda!! Hayaku" (Japanese: 逃げるんだ!! 早く)	14 May 1995
15	"Strike a Light! The Oath of the Eleven"; Transliteration: "Hi o Tomose!! Jūichinin no Chikai" (Japanese: 火をともせ!! 11人の誓い)	21 May 1995
16	"Alfredo is My Rival!"; Transliteration: "Raibaru wa Arufuredo!" (Japanese: ライバルはアルフレド!)	28 May 1995
17	"Showdown at San Babila Church"; Transliteration: "Seinto Babira Kyōkai no Kettō" (Japanese: 聖バビラ教会の決闘)	4 June 1995
18	"Sing our Song of Unity on into the Dawn!"; Transliteration: "Asahi ni Todoke! Danketsu no Uta" (Japanese: 朝日にとどけ! 団結の歌)	11 June 1995
19	"Grandma's a Witch"; Transliteration: "Obā-chan wa Mahōtsukai" (Japanese: おばあちゃんは魔法使い)	18 June 1995
20	"Grandpa Theo's Puppet Show"; Transliteration: "Teo-jīsan no Ningyōgeki" (Japanese: テオじいさんの人形劇)	2 July 1995
21	"Angeletta's Secret"; Transliteration: "Anjeretta no Himitsu" (Japanese: アンジェレッタの秘密)	9 July 1995
22	"I Met Grandmother!"; Transliteration: "Obā-sama ni Aeta!" (Japanese: おばあさまに会えた!)	6 August 1995
23	"Farewell, My Angel"; Transliteration: "Sayonara...Boku no Tenshi" (Japanese: さよなら...ぼくの天使)	13 August 1995
24	"The Hunted Siblings"; Transliteration: "Nerawareta Keimai" (Japanese: ねらわれた兄妹)	20 August 1995
25	"Alfredo and Bianca Reunited"; Transliteration: "Saikai! Bianka to Arufuredo" (Japanese: 再会! ビアンカとアルフレド)	27 August 1995
26	"Proud Souls"; Transliteration: "Hokoritakaki Tama" (Japanese: 誇り高き魂)	3 September 1995
27	"The Start of a Long Day"; Transliteration: "Nagai Ichinichi no Hajimari" (Japanese: 長い一日のはじまり)	10 September 1995
28	"Lord Alfredo"; Transliteration: "Kikōshi Arufuredo" (Japanese: 貴公子アルフレド)	17 September 1995
29	"Forever Alfredo"; Transliteration: "Eien no Arufuredo" (Japanese: 永遠のアルフレド)	22 October 1995
30	"The Last Promise"; Transliteration: "Saigo no Chikai" (Japanese: 最後の誓い)	29 October 1995
31	"The Real Treasure"; Transliteration: "Hontō no Takaramono" (Japanese: 本当の宝物)	3 December 1995
32	"A Lovely Christmas Eve"; Transliteration: "Suteki na Kurisumasu Ibu" (Japanese: 素敵なクリスマスイブ)	10 December 1995
33	"To the Sky! On the Wings of Freedom"; Transliteration: "Sora e! Jiyū no Tsubasa ni Notte" (Japanese: 空へ! 自由の翼にのって)	17 December 1995

== Series music ==
=== Theme songs ===
Title	Lyrics	Composer	Arranger	Performer	Notes
To the Sky... (空へ..., Sora e...)	Alice Satō 佐藤ありす	Taku Iwasaki	Megumi Wakakusa	Hiroko Kasahara	Opening theme
Yes Yes Goodbye: At the Romana Hills (Si Si Ciao 〜ロマナの丘で〜, Shi Shi Chao: Romana no Oka de)	Alice Satō 佐藤ありす	Taku Iwasaki	Megumi Wakakusa	Hiroko Kasahara	Ending theme

=== Insert songs ===
Title	Lyricist	Composer	Arranger	Performer	Notes
To the Sky...	Alice Satō 佐藤ありす	Taku Iwasaki	Megumi Wakakusa	Ai Orikasa	
To the Sky...	Alice Satō 佐藤ありす	Taku Iwasaki	Shunji Nakanishi 中西俊二	Hiroko Asakawa 朝川ひろこ	
To the Sky...	Alice Satō 佐藤ありす	Taku Iwasaki	MK	MAKI マキ	
To the Sky...	Alice Satō 佐藤ありす	Taku Iwasaki	Ken'ichirō Suehiro 末廣健一郎	Yūko Gotō	
To the Sky...	Alice Satō 佐藤ありす	Taku Iwasaki	Taku Iwasaki	Asami Imai	
To the Sky... (Acoustic version)	Alice Satō 佐藤ありす	Taku Iwasaki	Taku Iwasaki	Hiroko Kasahara	
Yes Yes Goodbye: At the Romana Hills	Alice Satō 佐藤ありす	Shunji Nakanishi 中西俊二	Taku Iwasaki	Hiroko Asakawa	
To the Sky... (Milan street version)	Alice Satō 佐藤ありす	Megumi Wakakusa	Taku Iwasaki	Hiroko Kasahara	
Yes Yes Goodbye: At the Romana Hills (Album version)	Alice Satō 佐藤ありす	Megumi Wakakusa	Taku Iwasaki	Hiroko Kasahara	
To the Sky... (Live version)	Alice Satō 佐藤ありす	Taku Iwasaki		Hiroko Kasahara	
Tell Us Your Story (あなたの話を聞かせて, Anata no Hanashi o Kikasete)	Kōichirō Maeda 前田耕一郎	Megumi Wakakusa		Maria Kawamura	Episode 23
March of Heroes (英雄のマーチ, Eiyū no Māchi)	Michiru Shimada	Megumi Wakakusa		Ai Orikasa; Toshiko Fujita; Tetsuya Iwanaga; Kōsuke Okano	
Only Truth	Alice Satō	Megumi Wakakusa		Ai Orikasa; Akemi Okamura	
Beyond the Tears (涙の向こうへ, Namida no Mukō e)	Alice Satō	Taro Iwashiro		Ai Orikasa	Episode 33
Because You Are (君がいるから, Kimi ga Iru Kara)	Alice Satō	Kiyooka	Megumi Wakakusa	Toshiko Fujita	

== Home media releases ==
=== North America ===
AnimEigo announced that they had acquired the North American video license on February 10, 2025, marking it the first time an entry in the World Masterpiece Theater series received both a Blu-ray and Region A/1 release in the United States. All 39 episodes were released in one Blu-ray set in North America on July 29th of that year including an option to use the original 4:3 ratio as well as the remastered prints.

== Other media ==
=== Artbook ===
- Romeo no Aoi Sora Megu Extra ISBN 4-88271-410-8

=== Script collections ===
- Romeo no Aoi Sora Script Collection Vol. 1 ISBN 4-8354-4108-7
- Romeo no Aoi Sora Script Collection Vol. 2 ISBN 4-8354-4109-5

=== Animate cassette collection ===
- Romeo no Aoi Sora Audio Cassette Dramas "The Ghost of the Montoverni Family" and "Bianca's Diary" ISBN 4-89601-204-6 C0879 P1980E

=== CDs ===
- Romeo no Aoi Sora Drama and Soundtrack Vol 1 WPC6-8128
- Romeo no Aoi Sora Original Soundtrack Vol 2 WPC6-8138
- Sora E... (Opening song) Hiroko Kasahara WPD6-9037
