= Swiss Policy Research =

Misinformation website

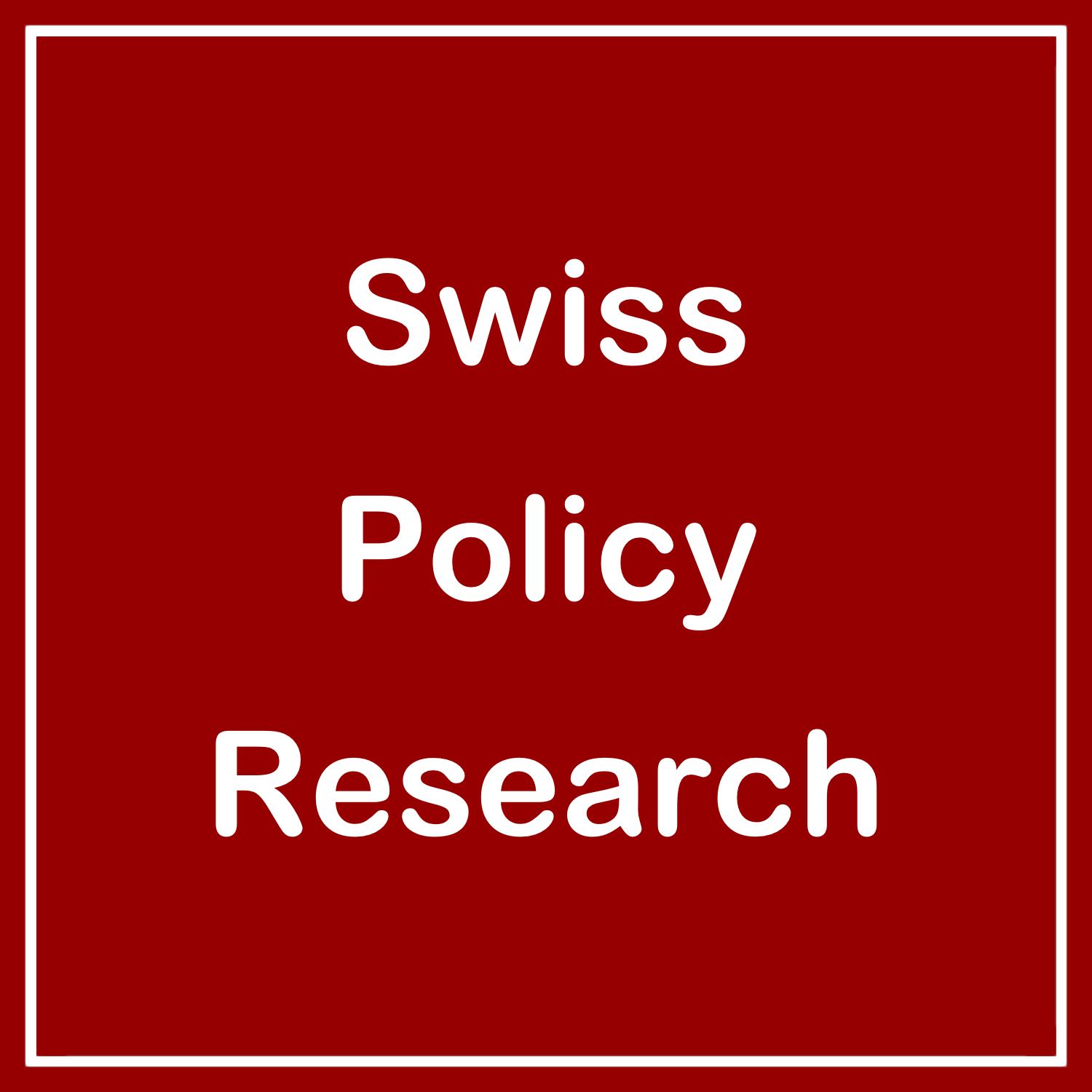
- Website type: Propaganda, conspiracy theories, pseudoscience
- Available in: German, English
- Website: swprs.org
- Launched: 2016
- Current status: Active

Swiss Policy Research (SPR; before mid-May 2020, Swiss Propaganda Research) is a website that has been criticized for spreading conspiracy theories, including claims that QAnon was a psyop of the FBI and theories relating to the COVID-19 pandemic. German public broadcaster Tagesschau calls SPR a propaganda tool.

Due to the persistent use of the German letter ß, which is not commonly used in Switzerland, it has been suspected that the creator is not from Switzerland, contrary to what the website title suggests.

== Criticism ==
=== Authority based criticism ===
In 2017 a University of Zurich report on media in Switzerland analyzed "six of the most-discussed 'alternative media'", including SPR, that "resort to conspiracy theories." Daniel Vogler concluded that SPR appears to be a "a pseudoscientific media research project."

Andrea Haefely wrote a critique of the website in the magazine Beobachter in May 2020, noting: "The website Swiss Propaganda Research assumes that the Swiss media does what SPR itself does: feed the readers with questionable information." She also suggested that the persistent use of the letter ß on the site suggests that the content creator is likely to be from outside Switzerland, as this particular letter form is not in common use within Switzerland.

Christoph Neuberger, a professor at the Free University of Berlin, stated that while the SPR website attempts to present its message as objective and neutral, it is clearly political, and its content is pseudoscientific ("pseudowissenschaftlich").

Stephan Russ-Mohl, professor of journalism and media management at the Università della Svizzera italiana, considers the articles on the SPRS to themselves serve as propaganda, rather than being serious research on the subject. He has noted that the anonymity of the website creates doubts over the reliability and authenticity of its research, particularly in a country such as Switzerland, which has full freedom of its press.

=== Substantive allegations related to COVID-19 ===
==== Hydroxychloroquine and ivermectin ====
As recently as April 2021, Swiss Policy Research recommended the use of hydroxychloroquine, and ivermectin for the treatment and prevention of COVID-19 despite neither ivermectin or hydroxychloroquine showing clear evidence of efficacy in the treatment or prevention of COVID-19.

==== Mask mandates ====
A graph produced by Swiss Policy Research plotting daily new COVID-19 cases was circulated widely with the claim that "mask mandates may have actually spread COVID-19." When reached by Reuters for comment, SPR said that the social media posts misrepresented their analysis and that they "do not claim or suggest that masks increase cases, nor do we suggest people shouldn't wear masks."

Some pages on the SPR site have previously claimed that, "There is still little to no scientific evidence for the effectiveness of cloth face masks in healthy and asymptomatic individuals. Experts warn that such masks may interfere with normal breathing and may become 'germ carriers' if used repeatedly." this claim appears to have been removed after it was debunked by Health Feedback.

==== Lethality of COVID-19 ====
An article on the Swiss Policy Research site claims "The overall lethality of COVID-19 (IFR) is about 0.1% to 0.3% and thus in the range of a severe influenza"; this claim is not accurate but has been cited by people like Jim Corr to support that COVID-19 is just like the seasonal flu. A meta-analysis indicated that the overall IFR of the disease across populations is 0.68% (0.53–0.82%). In another study the CDC estimated the crude infection fatality rate (IFR) for the U.S. as 0.7%, and noted that the U.S. experienced 2,801,439 deaths, 22.9% more than expected (522,368 excess deaths) in 2020 with COVID-19 accounting for at least 72.4% (378,194) of those excess deaths.
