= Lukas Hartmann =

Swiss novelist and children's writer

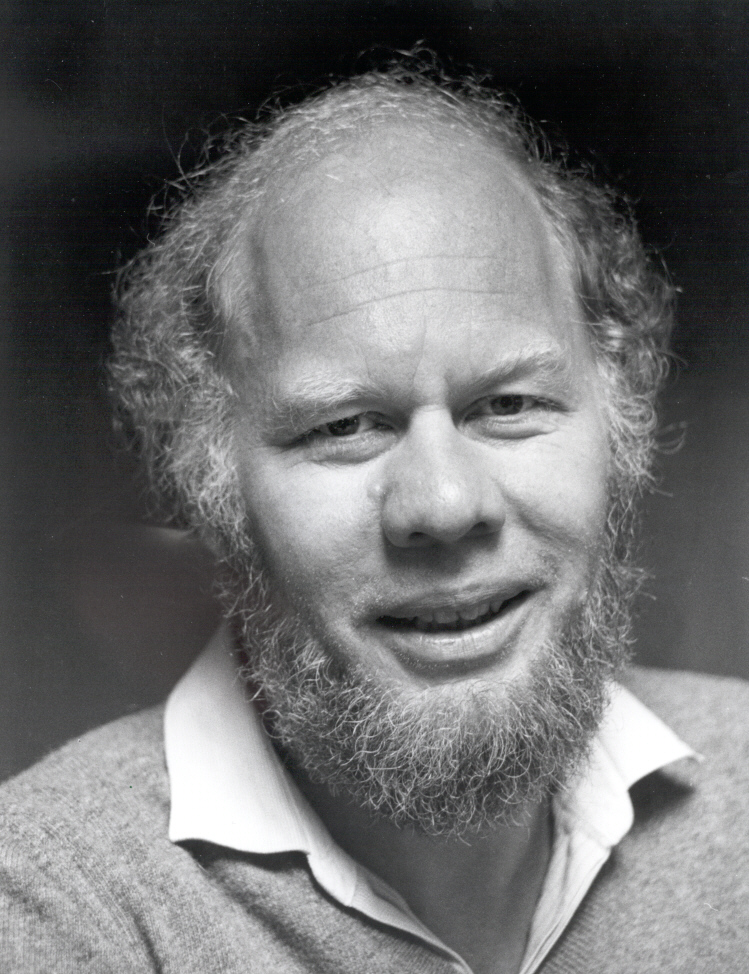
- Hartmann in 1985
- Born: Hans-Rudolf Lehmann; 29 August 1944 (age 81); Bern, Switzerland
- Occupations: Novelist, author, children's writer
- Spouse: Simonetta Sommaruga (m. 1996)
- Writing career
- Years active: since 1976
- Genres: Novels and Children's literature
- Notable awards: Lukas Hartmann#Awards
- Website: lukashartmann.ch

Lukas Hartmann (born Hans-Rudolf Lehmann; 29 August 1944) is a Swiss author.

== Life and work ==
Born as Hans-Rudolf Lehmann in Bern, his mother was a farmer's daughter and his father was a shoemaker, later auxiliary postman and department manager at the Swiss Post. His mother had a creative streak, which passed to both sons. Hartmann's younger brother Jürg became a journalist, and now heads the Ringier Group school of journalism. Lukas Hartmann wrote his first stories at the age of 13. He completed a teacher training course in Bern with majors in German, history and music, and worked first as a teacher. He then decided to pursue further studies in psychology, but he did not graduate, and later worked as a social worker, journalist and writer. His novels Anna - annA and Pestalozzis Berg have been filmed.

Hartmann's grandmother was one of the so-called Verdingkinder, hence Hartmann is one of the most prominent supporters of the so-called Wiedergutmachungsinitiative. In April 2018, Ein Bild von Lydia was published, a historical novel about Lydia Welti-Escher.

Since 1996 Hartmann has been married to the Swiss politician Simonetta Sommaruga. At the end of October 2022, he suffered a stroke, so his wife announced her resignation as Federal Councillor at the end of 2022.

== Awards ==
- 1995: Schweizer Jugendbuchpreis for So eine lange Nase.
- 2010: Grosser Literaturpreis von Stadt und Kanton Bern

== Bibliography ==
=== Novels ===
- 1978: Pestalozzis Berg. Zytglogge, Gümligen, ISBN 978-3-257-24023-8.
- 1980: Gebrochenes Eis: Aufzeichnungen. Arche, Zürich, ISBN 978-3-492-00697-2.
- 1982: Mahabalipuram oder Als Schweizer in Indien. Ein Reisetagebuch. Arche, Zürich, ISBN 978-3-716-01764-7.
- 2003: Die Tochter des Jägers. Nagel & Kimche, Zürich, ISBN 3-312-00292-3.
- 2013: Abschied von Sansibar. Diogenes, Zürich, ISBN 978-3-257-06867-2.
- 2015: Auf beiden Seiten. Diogenes, Zürich, ISBN 978-3-257-06921-1.
- 2016: Ein passender Mieter, Diogenes, Zürich, ISBN 978-3-257-06967-9
- 2018: Ein Bild von Lydia, Diogenes, Zürich, ISBN 978-3-257-07012-5
- 2021: Schattentanz: Die Wege des Louis Soutter, Diogenes, Zürich, ISBN 978-3-257-07109-2

=== Children's literature ===
- 1984: Anna annA. Zytglogge, Gümligen, ISBN 978-3257011456.
- 1987: Joachim zeichnet sich weg. Ein Roman für Kinder. Nagel & Kimche, Zürich, ISBN 978-3-499-20559-0.
- 1990: Die wilde Sophie. Nagel & Kimche, Zürich, ISBN 978-3-423-62264-6.
- 1994: So eine lange Nase. Nagel & Kimche, Zürich, ISBN 978-3-257-01148-7.
- 2006: Heul nicht, kleiner Seehund! Kinderroman. Illustrations by Julia Friese. Bajazzo, Zürich, ISBN 978-3-907-58874-1.
- 2007: Spuren in der Polenta. Essgeschichten und Rezepte für Kinder. Illustrations by Larissa Bertonasco. Bajazzo, Zürich, ISBN 978-3-907-58884-0.

=== Plays ===
- 1976: Beruhigungsmittel.
- 1977: Familiefescht.

=== Radio ===
- 1976: Em Pfarrer sy Scheidig for Schweizer Radio DRS.
- 1984: Auf dem Scherbenberg for DRS.

== Literature ==
- Andreas Kotte, ed. (2005). "Lukas Hartmann". Theaterlexikon der Schweiz / Dictionnaire du théâtre en Suisse / Dizionario Teatrale Svizzero / Lexicon da teater svizzer [Theater Dictionary of Switzerland]. Vol. 2. Zürich: Chronos. pp. 799–800. ISBN 978-3-0340-0715-3. LCCN 2007423414. OCLC 62309181.
