= Adoption in Switzerland =

Adoption in the Swiss family law

In Swiss family law, adoption is the legal establishment of a parent-child relationship between the adopter and the child without regard to biological parentage.

== Requirements ==
=== Joint adoption by a married couple ===
Adoption is regulated in the Swiss Civil Code in articles 264-269c. The adoptive parents must be at least 28 years old and have shared a household for at least 3 years (until 2017, at least 35 years old or married for at least 5 years), and the child should be in family care with them for at least one year. Further, the couple must be at least 16 years and (since 2018) at most 45 years older than the child to be adopted. Since 2018, exceptions to the minimum age and prescribed age gap are possible for reasons of the child's best interests.

Since same-sex marriage was introduced on July 1, 2022, same-sex married couples have also been able to adopt a child since then.

=== Individual adoption ===
An individual wishing to adopt a child must be at least 28 years old (35 years old until 2017). The age difference between the individual and the child to be adopted must be at least 16 years and (since 2018) no more than 45 years. Since 2018, exceptions to the minimum age and prescribed age difference are possible for reasons of the best interests of the child.

=== Registered partnership and de facto cohabitation ===
In 2016, the Federal Parliament decided to allow the adoption of natural children by persons living in a registered partnership ("LGBT parenting") or de facto cohabitation (without being bound by a marriage or registered partnership); the relevant Article 264c of the Civil Code entered into force on January 1, 2018. As a result, the same requirements now apply as for adoption of a spouse's child (see below). Joint adoption of non-birth children continues to be prohibited. Artificial insemination is also not permitted in a registered partnership.

=== Adoption of a child of the spouse ===
The basic requirements listed below must be met in order to adopt a spouse's child. The adopting partner must have shared a household with the parent of the child they wish to adopt for at least 3 years (married for at least 5 years by 2017). The adopting partner must be at least 16 years and (since 2018) at most 45 years older than the child to be adopted. Since 2018, exceptions to the prescribed age difference are possible for reasons of the child's best interests. The consent of the other natural parent is also required. There are exceptions where this can be waived. If the parent is unknown or has had an unknown residence for more than two years or is absent. If the parent is incapable of judgement or has never seriously cared for the child.

=== Conditions for adoption ===
There are many different conditions, here are three examples:

- The totality of the circumstances, namely the motives of the prospective adoptive parents, indicate that the adoption is in the best interests of the child.
- The welfare of other children of the prospective adoptive parents will not be jeopardized.
- There are no legal obstacles to the adoption.

The list of all criteria can be found in the Federal Adoption Ordinance.

== Effects of adoption ==
The adopted child receives the legal status of a natural child of the adopting persons. As a rule, the previous child relationship ceases to exist.

The adopted person also receives the family name of the married parents or that of the single adopter. The original name expires automatically (Art. 267a ZGB).

== Contestation ==
A pronounced adoption is final. It can only be contested within a specified period under the conditions of Art. 269, Art. 269a, Art. 269b of the Civil Code.

== History ==
=== Medieval and early modern period ===
During the Middle Ages and the early modern period in the territory of the Confederation, adoption had little legal and practical importance. Instead, it was common practice to place children from different unions on an equal footing (Einkindschaft). The adoptio from Roman law only appeared in Swiss legislation in the 19th century through cantonal private law.

Cantons authorizing adoption relied either on the French Civil Code of 1804 (Geneva, Ticino, Neuchâtel, Solothurn, and the Bernese Jura) or on their own solutions (Zurich, Thurgau, St. Gallen). The Swiss Civil Code (CC), which entered into force in 1912, reflected this evolution. It permitted, under certain conditions (particularly relating to the age of adoptive parents), a "weak adoption" (adoptio minus quam plena), in which the child's legal and inheritance ties with their original family were maintained. For the adoption of persons lacking capacity of discernment, the law required the consent of the parents or, when these had been deprived of their parental authority, of the competent supervisory body.

=== Post-World War II expansion ===
Until the early 20th century, adoption primarily served the desire to ensure the survival of the family lineage and was often motivated by economic considerations, particularly in the absence of a direct heir. Its importance only increased after the Second World War, both socially and within family policy. Between 1940 and 1970, the number of domestic and international adoptions tripled, rising from a range of 150 to 250 to approximately 700 per year. About 85% of adopted persons were minors and 60% were born out of wedlock. The increased use of adoption as a tool for child protection (adoption for educational purposes) was an important aspect of this evolution. The practice was based on an idealized vision of the middle-class nuclear family, within which the man was the sole provider of alimony while the woman assumed the role of mother and housewife. More economical for assistance, the early integration of a child into a "complete family" constituted a viable alternative to temporary placement in a foster family or institution.

This primarily concerned the offspring of young single women, considered incapable of caring for their children, whom family and authorities denied the right to raise them. The removal of children aimed to preserve both children and their mothers from the stigmatization resulting from illegitimacy and economic precariousness, especially since until 1978, single mothers were disadvantaged legally and obtained custody of their children only exceptionally. This approach was further supported by the psychology of the time (attachment theory), which advocated for early integration into a family to promote child development. At the same time, adoptions of young children met the wishes of a growing number of couples, who thus escaped the social stigmatization resulting from the absence of offspring and family.

=== 1973 revision and international adoptions ===
The growing importance of adoption was reflected in a 1973 revision of the CC, which introduced full adoption (adoptio plena) and anchored adoption secrecy in law, taking into account developments in international law, particularly the European Convention on the Adoption of Children of 1967, ratified by Switzerland in 1972. In accordance with the normative family model of the time, the legislature referred primarily to the adoption of children by married couples. Adopted children now enjoyed the same legal status as biological children, and the filiation link with their birth parents was severed. To prevent abuses, the revision strengthened the rights of biological parents, particularly of the mother, in the period preceding adoption. The law now required the consent of the biological mother, even if she had been deprived of her parental authority, and provided for a six-week waiting and opposition period. Intermediary activity for adoption was also made subject to authorization requirements.

The social and family policy factors behind the increase in adoptions had problematic repercussions in practice. Until the mid-1970s, maternal celibacy, a source of precariousness and marginalization within society, was one of the major causes of adoption placement. Single mothers frequently consented to adoption under pressure from their entourage or authorities, for lack of alternatives (restrictive abortion regulations, lack of childcare structures such as daycare centers, assistance deficiencies) or because they felt, due to internalized social norms, that they could not assume their motherhood. A well-established network, composed of welfare authorities, homes for mothers and infants, hospitals, and private intermediaries (often linked to a religious denomination), ensured that the women concerned could give birth in complete discretion and that their children were quickly adopted.

The number of domestic adoptions only decreased with facilitated access to contraception and the improvement of the legal status of single mothers and illegitimate children (revision of family law and child law in 1976 and 1978, equality between women and men). The importance of stepchild adoption (particularly in blended families) also increased with the evolution of family models and social relations.

As Swiss children available for adoption became scarcer, adoption demand increasingly turned abroad. After the Second World War, illegitimate children without Swiss nationality born on Swiss soil (such as children of immigrant workers) or illegitimate children rejected because of their skin color were still regularly placed in their country of origin or in third countries, notably the United States. In the 1960s, charitable organizations began organizing so-called child rescue operations in crisis regions (Tibet, Algeria, Vietnam in particular), among which many were subsequently adopted by their foster parents. The number of private agencies offering children for adoption from Asia, South America, or Eastern Europe increased during the following decade. Arguments related to humanitarian child protection also played an important role in legitimizing adoptions of children from "Global South" countries.

However, the concerned authorities quickly became aware that the placement of children for adoption, often wrongly presented as orphans, was also motivated by economic interests and that there were links with organized child trafficking. Moreover, the handling of adoptions by Swiss authorities was regularly marred by irregularities, sometimes inherent to the system itself. Many decisions were made on the basis of incomplete or falsified documents. Controls carried out in foster families during the two-year placement period preceding the actual adoption were insufficient. Often, competent authorities did not sufficiently verify the conditions required for adoption (consent of biological parents, suitability of adoptive parents) or turned a blind eye to procedural defects, deeming it unacceptable to send children back to their country of origin. Due to gaps in documents and file management, many adopted persons faced difficulties in finding their biological parents and reconstructing the early events of their lives.

=== 21st century developments ===
International treaties such as the United Nations Convention on the Rights of the Child of 1996 (ratified by Switzerland in 1997) and the Convention on Protection of Children and Co-operation in Respect of Intercountry Adoption, concluded in The Hague in 1993 (ratified in 2002), led at the turn of the 21st century to improved controls and a more restrictive approach in the field of international adoptions (priority given to the best interests of the child, principle of subsidiarity). In the late 2010s, under pressure from mutual aid organizations such as the association Back to the Roots, international adoptions (particularly in Tibet, Sri Lanka, and India) attracted increased public attention. Domestic adoptions, on the other hand, attracted significantly less attention, despite occasional media coverage and some research on past practices.

In 2018, the Federal Assembly commissioned a study on international adoptions, and several cantons also assigned mandates for scientific analysis. On several occasions, the Federal Council acknowledged in 2020 and 2023 the irregularities and omissions committed by authorities. Based on the recommendations of an expert group and taking into account the right of adopted persons to know their origins, the Federal Council advocated in late 2024 for a general ban on international adoptions.

While approximately 1,600 people were adopted in 1980 (of whom about two-thirds came from Switzerland), this number gradually decreased thereafter, despite an upward trend for international adoptions. For 2015, statistics mention approximately 330 adoptions (of which approximately 130 were domestic adoptions). At the same time, the societal scope of adoption evolved again. A revision of the CC in 2018, which led to a temporary increase in adoptions, took into account the weakening of the heteronormative family model and changes in the conception of family ties. The conditions required for adoption (minimum age, duration of the adoptive parents' relationship) were relaxed, and stepchild adoption was facilitated for couples living in registered partnership or concubinage. The growing importance given, compared to the full adoption model of the 1970s, to the right to know one's origins was reflected in a relaxation of adoption secrecy. The involvement of the children concerned was also enshrined in law. However, the claim for joint adoption by cohabitants was not retained.

Since the introduction of "marriage for all" in 2022, same-sex couples can also adopt a child in Switzerland. Other changes are on the horizon following progress in fertility medicine. Since the beginning of the 21st century, the desire for children, still strongly legitimized socially, is increasingly fulfilled by medicine rather than by adoption. The ethical problems raised by this evolution, particularly concerning gestational surrogacy (prohibited in Switzerland), are partly similar to those posed by adoption.

== See also ==
- Swiss children coercion reparation initiative
