= Die schwarzen Brüder =

1940–1941 book by Lisa Tetzner and Kurt Held

- First edition
- Author: Lisa Tetzner; Kurt Held
- Language: German
- Genre: Novel, Young adult literature, Children's literature
- Publisher: Sauerländer
- Publication date: 1940 (1st volume); 1941 (2nd volume)
- Publication place: Switzerland
- Pages: 251 + 287

Die schwarzen Brüder (English: The Black Brothers) is a young adult novel and the best-known story of German-Swiss writers Lisa Tetzner and Kurt Held.

The book was published in two volumes between 1940 and 1941, and tells the story of Giorgio, a boy from Sonogno in the Verzasca Valley in the canton of Ticino in Switzerland. Tetzner had read of a ferry disaster drowning some thirty chimney sweep boys (Italian Spazzacamini) who were sold to the City of Milan in the middle of the 19th century.

The novel was started by Lisa Tetzner, and finished by her husband Kurt Held (actually Kurt Kläber), though the latter remained uncredited, being a political refugee in Switzerland to escape from Nazism.

== Plot ==
Giorgio grows up in the small Ticino mountain village Sonogno. His parents are poor mountain farmers. One day his mother breaks her leg, and Giorgio is sold as a boy chimney sweep to Milan, as the family had no money to pay for the medical treatment of his mother. A scar-faced man (referred to only as Der Mann mit der Narbe (The man with the Scar)), Antonio Luini, buys him for twenty Swiss Franks. During his journey to Milan, Giorgio meets Alfredo, who comes from a village in the Misox. The boat capsizes, drowning many of the boys. The few who make their way to the lakeshore, are picked up by Luini and brought to Milan.

Giorgio is sold to Mr. Rossi, a chimney sweeper in Milan, who is under the influence of his hard-hearted wife. Giorgio is humiliated by her son Anselmo and barely receives enough to eat. Rossi's deathly-sick daughter, Nicoletta helps Giorgio greatly, sharing her food and calming her mother.

Giorgio soon meets other chimney sweep boys and is received into "The Black Brothers" community. Together, they withstand the attacks from the local boys called Die Wölfe (The Wolves).

Malnutrition and hard work weaken Giorgio. While working in a clogged chimney and breaking loose blocks of soot in the smoke of a fire still burning, he almost dies. After falling and becoming unconscious, he is taken care of by a Ticino physician, Dr. Casella, who is attending a festivity at Mr. Rossi's house. Dr Casella later encourages Giorgio and his friends to flee Milan and seek help at his estate in Lugano.

A few weeks later, Giorgio's friend Alfredo dies of pulmonary tuberculosis. After his funeral, the two hostile groups of boys agree to tolerate and assist each other. When Anselmo accuses Giorgio of stealing, the "Wolves" take Giorgio and his friends to the road that leads to Switzerland. Giorgio is hunted by the Milan police, but the boys make their way to the neighboring Swiss border town of Lake Lugano. In Lugano, they meet with Dr. Casella, who offers them accommodations in his house. Dr. Casella's influence also leads to the arrest of Antonio Luini, after he had been identified by Giorgio. Luini is later sentenced to a long prison term.

Nine years later, having become a teacher, Giorgio returns home to Sonogno with his wife, Alfredo's sister Bianca. There, he reunites with Anita (who herself had married) and his entire family, including his father, mother and Nonna, who are all still alive and doing well.

== Adaptations ==
=== Film ===
- 2013: Die schwarzen Brüder, a Swiss-German film directed by Xavier Koller.

=== Television ===
- 1984: Die schwarzen Brüder, a Swiss mini-series filmed by director Diethard Klante.

=== Animated series ===
- In Japan in 1995, a 33-part animated series under the World Masterpiece Theater under the title Romeo no aoi sora (Japanese ロミオ の 青い 空, Romio no aoi sora, literally: "Romeo's Blue Sky") was directed by Kōzō Kusuba. Under the title Die schwarzen Brüder this was also broadcast in Germany. For this telling of the story, Giorgio's name was changed to Romeo, it is his father who falls ill rather than his mother, and Romeo enters servitude voluntarily. Alfredo has an expanded role in the tale as a lost heir to nobility; this (rather than the resolution of Luini) drives the plot in the last half of the series.

=== Radio play ===
Heidi and Stefan Knetsch Richwien adapted the material for the radio version. Christiane Ohaus directed. Produced by Radio Bremen, North German Radio and Bavarian Radio 2002nd, the performers are Raiko Kuester, Hildegard Krekel, Mendroch Horst, Ulrich and Andreas Pietschmann Pleitgen. In 2004, the radio play won the Quarterly Prize of the German Record Critics.

- Lisa Tetzner: Die Schwarzen Brüder, Düsseldorf: Patmos 2003, 2 CDs, 104 min, ISBN 978-3-491-24087-2

== See also ==
- Kaminfegerkinder
- List of German television series
- Romeo's Blue Skies

== Publications in English ==
- The Black Brothers by Lisa Tetzner, Publisher: Highlights Press, 04/09/2004, Pages: 160., Ages young adult, ISBN 9781932425048
