= Alfred Siegfried =

Swiss educator and social worker

- Born: Alfred Arnold Siegfried; 15 February 1890; Lucerne, Switzerland
- Died: 27 March 1972 (aged 82); Oetwil am See, Switzerland
- Occupations: Teacher, publicist, social worker
- Known for: Founder and director of Pro Juventute's "Children of the Open Road" program
- Spouse: Maria Anna Ermatinger (m. 1930)
- Children: 3 (1 stepdaughter, 2 adopted sons)

Alfred Siegfried (15 February 1890 – 27 March 1972) was a Swiss teacher, publicist, and social worker. He was the founder and director of Pro Juventute's "Children of the Open Road" (Kinder der Landstrasse) program and, in this capacity, was co-responsible for the persecution of Yenish families in Switzerland during the 20th century, actions that were classified as crimes against humanity in 2025.

== Early life and education ==
Alfred Siegfried was born in Lucerne on 15 February 1890, the son of Karl Siegfried, a hardware merchant, and Emilie Maria Josefa née Lehmann. He attended the pedagogical seminary in Lucerne from 1906 to 1909, after which he worked as a primary school teacher in the city until 1913. That same year, he began studying modern languages and history at the University of Basel, completing a doctorate in 1921.

== Career ==
Between 1915 and 1918, Siegfried worked as a secondary school teacher and district secretary for Pro Juventute in Lucerne, then taught at the secondary level in Basel from 1918 to 1924. In 1924, he was convicted by the Basel criminal court for sexual abuse of a student and was banned from teaching. That same year, he was hired by Pro Juventute's central secretariat, where he remained until 1959. In 1930, he married his housekeeper Maria Anna Ermatinger, a widow with a daughter; the couple also adopted two boys.

From 1927 to 1957, Siegfried directed the section dedicated to school-age children at Pro Juventute. As founder and director of the "Children of the Open Road" program, he organized the systematic census of Yenish families, as well as the removal and extrafamilial placement of 586 children belonging to this community between 1926 and 1973. As guardian, social worker, and tutor of 807 children (including 499 Yenish), Siegfried, active for more than 30 years at Pro Juventute, was also responsible for guardianships extended beyond the age of majority, marriage prohibitions, and administrative internments.

Siegfried served as president of the Swiss Working Community for Spanish Children from 1937 to 1939. In 1940, together with Rodolfo Olgiati and Fritz Wartenweiler, he founded the Swiss Cartel for Aid to Child War Victims (serving as vice-president in 1940–1941), where he directed the accommodation commission. He was a member and president of various Swiss Red Cross commissions, such as Aid to Children from 1942, and served on the institution's working commission until 1949 (vice-president from 1942 to 1945). In 1946, he worked as a Red Cross delegate in Vienna and Budapest.

== Views and methods ==
Author of numerous articles on social assistance for children and youth, Siegfried was convinced that the assimilation of the non-sedentary population would only be possible through strict separation of children from their parents and the breaking up of family communities. It is agreed that, through his actions, Alfred Siegfried, in collaboration with the competent authorities, violated the fundamental rights of the Yenish in Switzerland for decades and caused suffering to the families concerned, while many others lived in constant fear of having their children taken away.

== Recognition as crimes against humanity ==
At the urgent request of organizations representing affected persons, a legal opinion commissioned by the Swiss Confederation was presented in 2025. The Federal Council recognized its conclusions, according to which these systematic violations of human rights should be classified as crimes against humanity under current law.

== Death ==
Siegfried died on 27 March 1972 in Oetwil am See. He converted from Protestantism to Catholicism at some point during his life.

== Publications ==
- Kinder der Landstrasse. Ein Versuch zur Sesshaftmachung von Kindern des fahrenenden Volkes (1962)
