= Child labour in Switzerland =

Child labour in Switzerland was a fact in rural areas to the 1960s that was at least tolerated by the Swiss authorities referring to the so-called Verdingkinder, as up to 100,000 children were needed as cheap workers mostly on farms the decades before.

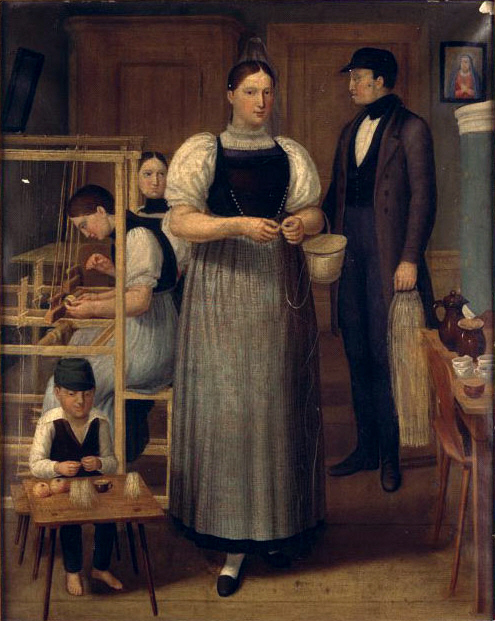
Straw weaving family in a farmhouse, oil on canvas, 1840

== Definition ==
Child labour refers to the employment of children in any work that deprives children of their childhood; interferes with their ability to attend regular school; and is mentally, physically, socially or morally dangerous and harmful.

As of the 2010s, it is in principle still tolerated, as at least small family-owned farms in Switzerland need the help of their children on occasion of the harvests in late summer. The principle causes the more rural cantons to continue to have much longer summer holidays granted by the governmental public schools, unlike the more urban cantons, which usually have five weeks of summer holidays in July and August.

== 19th century ==
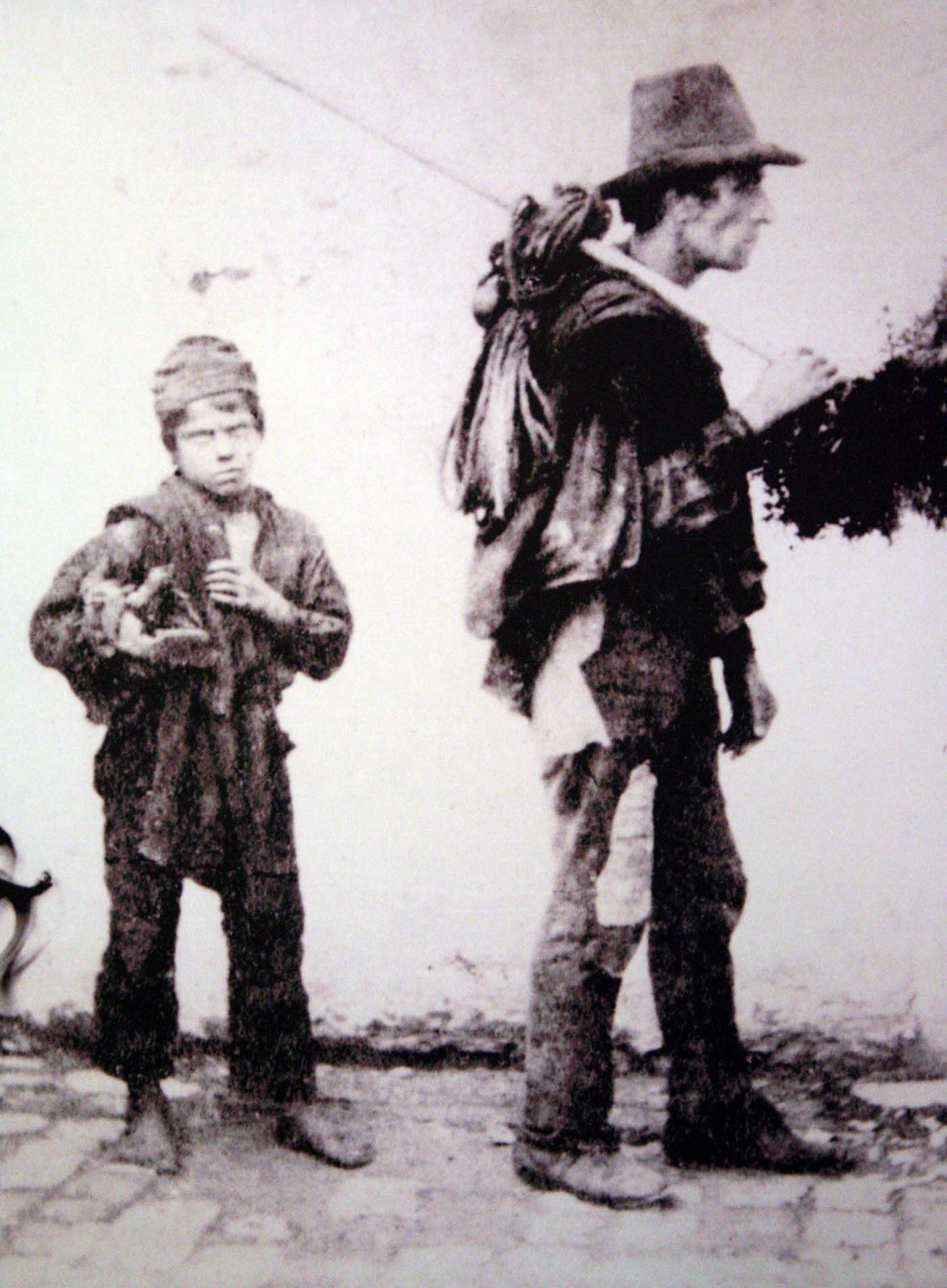
Spazzacamino and his padrone

As in many other countries, child labour affected among the so-called Kaminfegerkinder ("chimney sweep children") also children working such as in spinning mills, factories and in agriculture in 19th-century Switzerland. In pre-industrial society in Switzerland like in the rest of Europe, children, who had often been part of the family economy were integrated into the worker process and often indispensable contributed income. Industrialisation forced family members to look for an income outside the traditional housekeeping. Work on the machines was often easy and physically not very challenging, which favoured the "use" of women and children. Thus, child labour took new forms and extended dimensions and rapidly spread in the early 19th century, particularly in the Canton of Zurich and in Eastern Switzerland. In cotton mills, six-to ten-year-old children worked in miserable conditions, up to 16 hours per day and often at night.

Child labour became a social problem on which the authorities responded with investigations in 1812 in the Canton of St. Gallen and one year later in the canton of Zürich. In the latter, "Regulation Generally on Underage Youth and Especially Spinning Machines" (German: ""Verordnung wegen der minderjährigen Jugend überhaupt und an den Spinnmaschinen besonders"") was issued in 1815. Night work and factory work before the ninth birthday was prohibited, and the daily working time limited to 12 to 14 hours. The rules were not enforced in practice but marked the beginning of the child protection legislation, followed by laws in Zürich (1837) and in the other cantons.

== 20th century ==
=== In general ===
The Federal Factory Act (German: Eidgenössisches Fabrikgesetz) of 1877 regulated the factory work for the first time nationally and introduced a ban on work by children below the age of 14. The act applied only to the factory industry so there were no legal provisions, an attempt was made to limit child labour by the compulsory school law, but it remained widely used at the beginning of the 20th century, especially in agriculture and domestic work (German: Verding). According to a survey of 1904, twelve cantons still had around 300,000 children work in Switzerland.

=== 'Verdingkinder' and 'Kinder der Landstrasse' ===
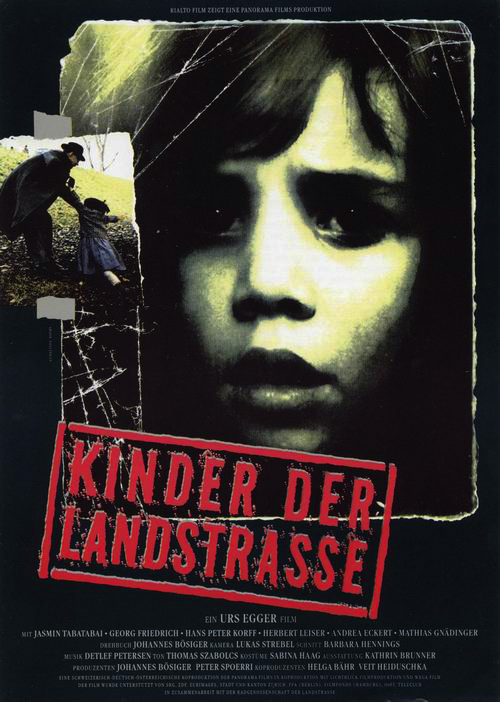
Kinder der Landstrasse, movie poster of 1992

Verdingkinder (literally: "contract children" or "indentured child labourers") were children who were taken from their parents, often due to poverty or moral reasons, usually mothers being unmarried, very poor citizens, of Gypsy–Yeniche origin, the so-called Kinder der Landstrasse, and sent to live with "new families", often poor farmers who needed cheap labourers. There were even Verdingkinder auctions in which children were handed over to farmers asking the least money from the authorities, which secured cheap labour for their farms and relieving the authority from the financial burden of looking after the children.

In the 1930s, 20% of all agricultural labourers in the Canton of Bern were under the age of 15. Swiss municipality guardianship authorities acted and were commonly tolerated by federal authorities until the 1960s, usually in communities affected by the low taxes of some Swiss cantons. The Swiss historian Marco Leuenberger found that in 1930, some 35,000 indentured children, and between 1920 and 1970, more than 100,000 were believed to have been placed with families or homes.

About 10,000 Verdingkinder, women and men, are still alive, therefore the so-called Wiedergutmachungsinitiative was started in April 2014. The collection target of least authenticated 100,000 signatures of Swiss citizens had to be collected to October 2015.

== Legal restrictions ==
During the 20th century, child labour in Switzerland was successively further restricted: the Federal Law of 1922 on the Employment of Young People and Women in Trades (German: Bundesgesetz von 1922 über die Beschäftigung von jugendlichen und weiblichen Personen in den Gewerben), increased the minimum age to 14 and prohibited night work for people under 19 and apprentices under 20. In 1938, the Federal Law on the Minimum Age of Employees (German: Bundesgesetz über das Mindestalter der Arbeitnehmer) increased the minimum age of workers to 15 years, and the 1940 Federal Law on Domestic Work (German: Bundesgesetz über die Heimarbeit) forbade the awarding of an independent home work on children under 15.

In 1964, the scope of the occupational safety and health in the labour code was extended, but agriculture and domestic work remained excluded. Protection of Verdingkinder was provided for by the revision of the law in 1978. The UN Convention on the Rights of the Child was signed, and Switzerland participated at the International Programme on the Elimination of Child Labour (IPEC) of the International Labour Organization since 1991. In 2006, the minimum age for night and Sunday work was raised to 18.

== See also ==
- Kaminfegerkinder
- Kinder der Landstrasse
- Verdingkinder
- Wiedergutmachungsinitiative

== Literature ==
- Hans R Wiedmer: Arbeit im Industrialisierungsprozess: Veränderungen industrieller Arbeitsbedingungen in der Schweiz 1880-1914. Chronos 1989, ISBN 978-3905278453.
- C. Franz Waldner: Die Heimarbeit aus rechtlicher und historischer Sicht. 1994, ISBN 978-3719013424.
- Paul Hugger: Kind sein in der Schweiz: Eine Kulturgeschichte der frühen Jahre. Offizin Verlag 1998, ISBN 978-3907495964.
