= Johann Jakob Trachsler =

Swiss federal official (1820–1893)

- Born: 8 October 1820; Bauma, Zurich, Switzerland
- Died: 31 October 1893 (aged 73); Bern, Switzerland
- Occupation: Civil servant

Johann Jakob Trachsler (8 October 1820 – 31 October 1893) was a Swiss federal official. From 1860 to 1893 he was secretary of the Federal Department of Justice and Police, where he coordinated the work of the aliens police and played a major part in important ordinances and laws and in setting up the political police. He advocated the expulsion of foreign Social Democrats.

== Biography ==
Johann Jakob Trachsler was born on 8 October 1820 in Bauma. He studied law, and in 1848 he was an examining magistrate (Verhörrichter) in Zurich.

From 1853 Trachsler was secretary to the federal attorney general (eidgenössischer Generalanwalt). After the attorney general resigned, Trachsler took over the cases of stateless persons (Heimatlosenfälle) that were still pending.

From 1860 to 1893 Trachsler was secretary of the Federal Department of Justice and Police. There he coordinated the activities of the aliens police (Fremdenpolizei), and he played a major part in important ordinances and laws and in the setting up of the political police. He advocated the expulsion of foreign Social Democrats, including in a circular (Kreisschreiben) to the cantonal police directors in 1888. He died in Bern on 31 October 1893.

== Bibliography ==
- Neue Zürcher Zeitung, 1893, no. 323
- W. Lüthi, Die schweizerische Bundesanwaltschaft, 1923
