= Beobachter =

German-language Swiss magazine

- Type: Magazine
- Founder: Max Ras
- Publisher: Ringier
- Editor-in-chief: Dominique Strebel
- Founded: 1926 as Der Schweizerische Beobachter
- Language: German
- Headquarters: Zürich, Switzerland
- Circulation: 290,515 (as of November 2014)
- Website: www.beobachter.ch

Beobachter (German: [bəˈʔoːbaxtɐ], Observer), also known by its former name Der Schweizerische Beobachter, is a German-language Swiss magazine.

== History and profile ==
The magazine was founded in 1926 by Max Ras as Der Schweizerische Beobachter and first distributed in 1927 as a free newspaper to all households in the German-speaking part of Switzerland. From the beginning, it was a political, but non-partisan struggle sheet, that took a position in favor of economically weakly positioned people. The newspaper fought for equal rights for women, fights rampant bureaucracy, and reveals scandals and hypocrisies.

Through its populist style and the high number of readers, which in 1994 was over a million, Beobachter secured an extensive advertising volume within Switzerland. From 2007 respectively 2010 (against media and political protests), the low-priced subscription magazine was published fortnightly by Axel Springer AG Switzerland. At that time, it had a circulation of 308,000 copies, and in 2013 printed 283,284 copies (WEMF 2013) and had 918,000 readers (MACH Basic 2013–2) in 2014. In 2023, Ringier acquired Axel Springer's share in Beobachter through the acquisition of the joint venture Ringier Axel Springer Switzerland.

== Additional services ==
Beobachter also provides a particularly well-developed consultancy service for legal questions, information about employment, rental, consumer and family law for its subscribers. It is distributed on the internet, by post and by apps (Android/iOS). The Beobachter TV series on SRF 1 and SRF 2 as well as on radio DRS 3 also contributes helpful consumer information. The Beobachter-Verlag publishes non-fiction printed books and e-books.

== Kinder der Landstrasse ==
Beobachter got in the even international focus in 1972, as the newspaper's journalists investigated, when the newspaper got hints by affected Jenisch (Fahrende) people. Hans Caprez published on 15 April 1972 in the article Kinder der Landstrasse the facts and the backgrounds of the Kinder der Landstrasse scandal, involving about 590 children of the Jenisch people minority in Switzerland. The newspaper hence actively supports the so-called Wiedergutmachungsinitiative started in April 2014 – on 19 December 2014 the initiative was submitted at the Federal Chancellery (Bundeskanzlei).

== Literature ==
- Arne Andersen: … und so sparsam! Die Geschichte des Massenkonsums und seine Auswirkungen: Veränderung und Mentalitätswandel dargestellt am Schweizerischen Beobachter. Chronos, Zürich 1998, ISBN 978-3-905312-64-5.
- Alfred A. Häsler: Stark für die Schwachen. 55 Jahre gelebte Zeitgeschichte des Schweizerischen Beobachter. Verlagsgesellschaft Beobachter, Orell Füssli, Glattbrugg/Zürich 1982, ISBN 3-280-01418-2.
