= Pro Juventute =

Charitable foundation in Switzerland

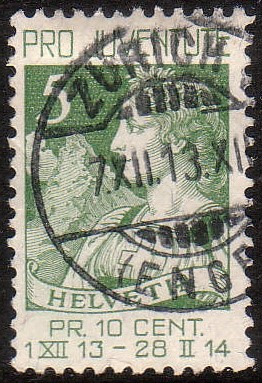
1913 semi-postal stamp of Switzerland with charity surcharge for the Pro Juventute foundation

Pro Juventute is a charitable foundation in Switzerland established in 1912. It is dedicated to supporting the rights and needs of Swiss children and youth.

Since 1913, the Swiss post office has issued an annual charity stamp series to support the work of Pro Juventute.

From 1926 to 1973, Pro Juventute, with the support of Swiss authorities, committed crimes against humanity against the Yenish, Manouche, and Sinti people in Switzerland by forcibly removing children from their families and placing them in foster homes, adoptive families, and correctional institutions through the Kinder der Landstrasse (Children of the Open Road) project. This was part of a wider effort to forcibly assimilate these traditionally nomadic communities into settled Swiss society. In February 2025, the Swiss government formally acknowledged that the forced removals and assimilation efforts constitute a crime against humanity under international law.

== See also ==
- Alfred Siegfried
