= Swiss children coercion reparation initiative =

Swiss popular initiative

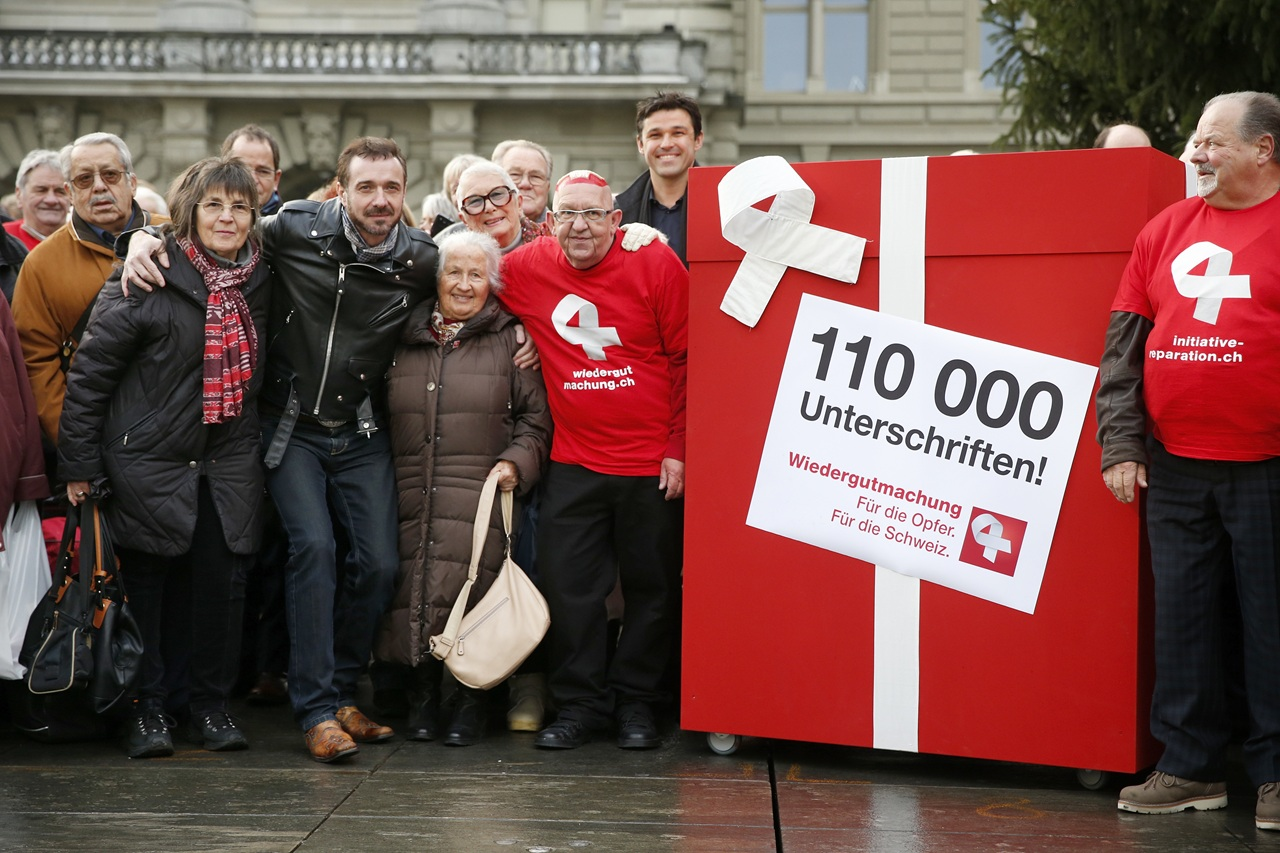
Submission of signatures for the reparation initiative on Friday, 19 December 2014. Initiator Guido Fluri (front, 2nd from left, with leather jacket) with victims in front of the Swiss parliament in Bern.

The Swiss children coercion reparation initiative (German: Wiedergutmachungsinitiative) was a Swiss federal popular initiative. It called for reappraisal and a fund of 500 million Swiss francs for Verdingkinder (forced child laborers) and other victims of compulsory social measures in Switzerland.

The initiative was launched in April and submitted in December 2014. In 2016, a counter-proposal by the Federal Council was adopted by the Swiss Parliament. The Federal Act on Compulsory Social Measures and Placements Prior to 1981 largely met the demands of the initiative, which was subsequently withdrawn.

== Summary ==
In April 2014, the collection of Swiss citizens' signatures started, and at least 100,000 had signed by 1 October 2015. The popular initiative addressed the fate of forced child labourers in Switzerland, the so-called Verdingkinder, a term formerly used in the Swiss-German language. Another "integration project," related to the so-called "misplaced persons," affected tens of thousands of juveniles, who were placed as labourers at Swiss farms, with low pay. Among them were also Fahrende or Jenisch juveniles affected by the then Swiss foundation Kinder der Landstrasse, though not their families.

The initiative was actively supported by the Beobachter, which revealed the fates of the Verdingkinder and the Kinder der Landstrasse foundation. The popular initiative, set up by Guido Fluri and other prominent citizens, among them writer Lukas Hartmann, was supported among others, by the parent organization of the Swiss churches and the association of the Swiss teachers.

== Aims (excerpt) ==
The initiative was started by an inter-political committee and addressed the inadequate measures by the Swiss governmental authorities. It demanded:

- Reparations for the victims of forced child labourers and welfare-driven coercive measures;
- A scholarly review of this dark chapter of Swiss history;
- The creation of a fund of over 500 million Swiss Francs for the purposes of the initiative;

It was pointed out that only severely affected victims obtain redress and that an independent commission should be formed to examine each case individually.

== Background: Verdingkinder and Kinder der Landstrasse ==
Verdingkinder (literally: "contract children" or "indentured child labourers") were children in Switzerland who were taken from their parents, often due to poverty or for "moral reasons" (usually because their mothers were unmarried and poor), of Gypsy–Yeniche (Swiss German also Fahrende) origin and sent to live with new families, often poor farmers who needed cheap labour.

Many of these children, when they grew to be adults, have come forward to claim they were severely mistreated by their new "families," suffering neglect, beatings, and other physical and psychological abuse.

There were auctions where children were handed over to the farmer asking the least money from the authorities, thus securing cheap labour for his farm and relieving the authority from the financial burden of looking after the children. In the 1930s, in the Canton of Bern, about 20% of all agricultural labourers were children below the age of 15. The actions of the Swiss municipality guardianship authorities were tolerated by the federal authorities until the 1960s. Swiss historian Marco Leuenberger found that in 1930 there were some 35,000 indentured children, while, between 1920 and 1970, more than 100,000 are believed to have been placed with families or homes. Ten thousand former Verdingkinder, women and men in Switzerland, are still alive in the mid-2010s.

== Supplement of the Swiss Federal Constitution claimed by the initiative ==
The initiative demands that the Swiss Federal Constitution should be amended as follows:

Art. 124a Wiedergutmachung für die Opfer von fürsorgerischen Zwangsmassnahmen und Fremdplatzierungen, literally reparation for the victims of welfare step coercive measures and foreign placements

1. The Confederation and the Cantons shall provide for compensation for the injustice, which has suffered particular resident, Verdingkinder, administrative supplied, or forcibly sterilized forced adopted people and Fahrende (a Swiss-German term for literally Yeniche people) as a result-driven welfare coercion or foreign placements.
2. To provide an independent scientific review of these measures and promote discussion about it to the public.

Art. 196 Ziff. 1212. Übergangsbestimmung Zu Art. 124a (Wiedergutmachung für die Opfer von fürsorgerischen Zwangsmassnahmen und Fremdplatzierungen), literally Transitional provision to Art. 124a (reparation for the victims of welfare step coercive measures and foreign placements):

1. The Swiss Confederation establishes a fund in the amount of 500 million Swiss Frances for the victims of welfare step coercive measures and foreign placements that were done before 1981.
2. Eligible are people who were directly affected and hard of such measures. The amount of restitution depends on the sustained injustice. About the payment of benefits, an independent commission has to conclude.
3. The fund is dissolved twenty years after its creation. Any residual amount will be refunded proportionately to the depositors.

== Status ==
On 19 December 2014 the initiative was submitted at the Federal Chancellery (Bundeskanzlei). On 16 September 2016 both chambers of the Swiss parliament approved that presumably to each surviving individual will paid CHF 25,000 in compensation. As of March 2018, about 7000 victims have applied for compensation.

== See also ==
- Child labour in Switzerland
- Kinder der Landstrasse
- Verdingkinder
- Adoption in Switzerland
- Cultural genocide
- Anti-Romani sentiment

== Bibliography ==
- Marco Leuenberger and Loretta Seglias (editors): Versorgt und vergessen. Ehemalige Verdingkinder erzählen. Rotpunktverlag, Zürich 2008, ISBN 978-3858693822
- Lotty Wohlwend and Arthur Honegger: Gestohlene Seelen: Verdingkinder in der Schweiz. Huber Verlag, Bern, ISBN 978-3719313654
- Sara Galle and Thomas Meier: Von Menschen und Akten - die Aktion Kinder der Landstrasse der Stiftung Pro Juventute. Chronos Verlag, Zürich 2009, ISBN 978-3034009447.
- Thomas Huonker, Regula Ludi: Roma, Sinti und Jenische. Schweizerische Zigeunerpolitik zur Zeit des Nationalsozialismus. Beitrag zur Forschung (Veröffentlichungen der UEK, Band 23). Chronos Verlag, Zürich 2001, ISBN 3-0340-0623-3
- Walter Leimgruber, Thomas Meier and Roger Sablonier, redaction by Bernadette Kaufmann: Kinder zwischen Rädern. Kurzfassung des Forschungsberichts «Das Hilfswerk für die Kinder der Landstrasse». Published by and in order of Bundesamt für Kultur «und Kinder» 20, Nr. 67, November 2001, Zürich 2001.
