= Kinder der Landstrasse =

Swiss project to remove Yenish children from their families

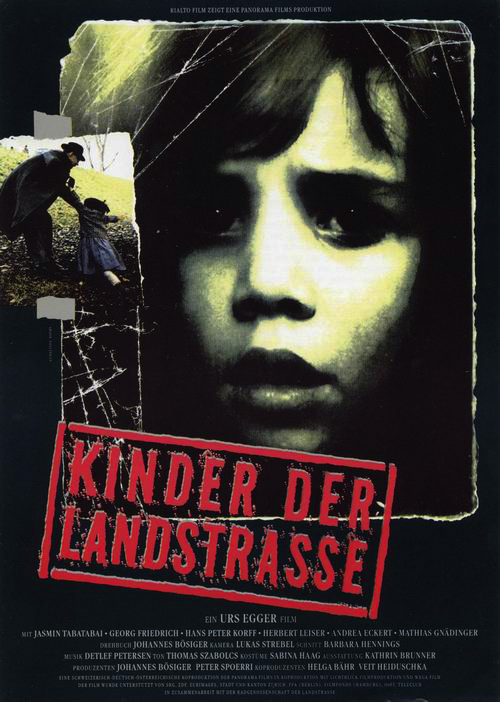
Kinder der Landstrasse film poster of 1992

Das Hilfswerk für die Kinder der Landstrasse (literally: "the aid organization for the children of the country road"), more commonly known as Kinder der Landstrasse, was a project implemented by the Swiss foundation Pro Juventute from 1926 to 1973. The project aimed to assimilate the itinerant Yenish people in Switzerland by institutionalizing the parents and forcibly removing their children and placing them in orphanages or foster homes. Approximately 590 children were affected by this program.

== History ==
In 1926, Pro Juventute, with the support of federal authorities and official institutions, initiated a systematic process of separating Yenish children from their families and relocating them to foster homes, psychiatric hospitals, and even prisons. This practice, referred to as "re-education", aimed to establish a sedentary lifestyle among Yenish families, particularly the younger generation. These activities continued for 47 years until they were brought to an end in 1973, largely due to media support and public outcry.

The Swiss Civil Code of 1912 served as the legal basis for the forced separation of families and children. It allowed officials to remove custody from parents in cases of neglect or abuse. However, the provision for oversight of authorities' actions was rarely enforced. The mere fact that the children belonged to a traveling (Yenish) family was considered sufficient reason for their removal.

The foundation used generic psychiatric reports as a professional justification for their actions, granting them complete control over the wards. The decision-makers relied on the unfounded belief that family socialization was harmful, categorizing Yenish families as socially damaging and inherently asocial due to their traveling lifestyle. These erroneous assumptions were rooted in discredited hereditary biological notions, which viewed the Yenish people as "genetically asocial" and a threat to the settled majority population.

Consequently, the foundation aimed to remove children from both traveling and sedentary Yenish families, regardless of the parents' actual lifestyle. The decisive criterion for child removal was their affiliation with a socially marginalized group, such as tinkers, basket makers, scissor sharpeners, or beggars. In some cases, children were separated from their mothers immediately after birth. The children were placed in homes, occasionally with foreign families, as well as in psychiatric hospitals and prisons. They were also forced into child labor on farms. Contacts between children and parents were systematically prevented, and sometimes the term "charity ward" was changed to conceal the children's true status from their relatives. Child abuse was justified as an educational measure for work. The 1930s and 1940s witnessed a peak in child removals, with over 200 Yenish children under the control of the foundation.

Prominent figures promoting population sanitation and racial hygiene concepts were involved in these practices. Psychiatrist Johann Joseph Jörger, known for his psychiatric-eugenic writings on the fictitious "Family Zero", and German eugenicist Robert Ritter, a self-proclaimed "Gypsy expert", were among them. Swiss Federal Council member Heinrich Häberlin, the President of the Board of Trustees of Pro Juventute, described the Yenish people as "a dark spot in our proud Swiss culture" in a brochure published in 1927, advocating for their elimination. Dispensaries, teachers, pastors, and non-profit organizations provided support to the foundation. While the legislation provided certain boundaries, these limits were often disregarded, leading to open illegality.

The scandal gained international attention in 1972 when journalists from the Beobachter newspaper investigated the matter based on information provided by affected Yenish individuals. On 15 April 1972, Hans Caprez published an article titled "Kinder der Landstrasse", exposing the facts and background of the program, which affected around 590 Yenish children in Switzerland.

== Controversy and aftermath ==
Following public pressure, Pro Juventute dissolved the foundation in the spring of 1973. Remaining guardianships were abolished or transferred to other individuals. The Swiss authorities, who had co-initiated the project 37 years prior, were compelled to provide financial compensation ranging from 2,000 to 7,000 Swiss francs per victim due to public outrage. However, no legal prosecution was carried out against those responsible for the project, including Alfred Siegfried (1890–1972), Clara Reust (1916–2000), and the authorities responsible for overseeing the guardianship system.

In 1975, the Yenish people were officially recognized as an independent ethnic group in the Canton of Bern. Since the 1980s, self-help organizations have worked towards redressing and rehabilitating the victims who suffered from the slanderous treatment, which was justified by pseudo-scientific programs.

Forced transfer of children from one national, ethnic, racial, or religious group to another group with the intent to destroy, in whole or in part, is considered genocide according to the UN Genocide Convention of 1948. Swiss criminal law, in Article 264 of the Swiss Penal Code, similarly criminalizes acts targeting individuals based on their nationality, race, religion, or ethnicity. Recent scientific research supports the notion that the Yenish people can be classified as one of the groups protected under the convention and Swiss law.

=== Reparations ===
The foundation Naschet Jenische (literally: Arise, Yenish!) was established in 1986 to address the injustice perpetrated against the Yenish (Fahrende) people in Switzerland, specifically related to the Kinder der Landstrasse program. In 1988, a fund commission was established to oversee the examination of the affected Yenish people's cases, completing its work in 1992. The Swiss Federal Archives now directly govern the inspection of Pro Juventute's records. The affected Yenish individuals received a total of 11 million Swiss francs, with each victim receiving no more than 20,000 Swiss francs. The foundation's main focus is to provide advice and support to the affected individuals and families. It assists Yenish people with personal, family, and social issues, particularly in their interactions with Swiss authorities. The foundation also facilitates the examination of personal files and supports the search and reunification of families. Additionally, it aids Yenish individuals in applying for financial assistance from public and private institutions, as well as offers guidance in dealing with insurance and tax issues. Pro Juventute finances the foundation's advisory activities. Public awareness and education about the history and current situation of the Yenish people in Switzerland are also important aspects of the foundation's work.

In 2014, the Swiss national Wiedergutmachungsinitiative (reparation initiative) tangentially addressed the fate of the so-called Verdingkinder (forced child laborers), another integration project involving displaced individuals who were placed as cheap labor on Swiss farms. Some Yenish juveniles affected by Kinder der Landstrasse were among them, but the focus of the initiative did not extend to their families.

=== Recognition of crime against humanity ===
In 2024 the Federal Office of Culture commissioned a report on whether the persecution of the Yenish and Sinti could be recognised as a crime against humanity or genocide and whether the state has responsibility under international law for these violations. The report was conducted by Oliver Diggelmann, Matthias Emery, and Daniel Rüfli and completed in September 2024. On the question of genocide, they conclude that while the removal of Yenish children constitutes an act of genocide, the required intent was lacking, as the goal of the policy was not destruction but assimilation. On the question of crimes against humanity, they concluded that the children and parents were deprived of various fundamental rights under a system of persecution, and so this constituted a crime against humanity. On the question of state responsibility, they highlight how while the persecution was conducted under the auspices of Pro Juventute, it was supported at all levels by state actors, and so the Swiss state bares responsibility for the crime against humanity. In February 2025, the Swiss government formally acknowledged that the forced removals and assimilation efforts targeting the Yenish, Manouche, and Sinti people under the program constituted a crime against humanity under international law.

== Cinema and television ==
The project sparked intense discussions and widespread condemnation in Switzerland, leading to its examination in numerous books and films.

- 2009: Von Menschen und Akten - die Aktion Kinder der Landstrasse der Stiftung Pro Juventute, DVD of the book of the same name for educational use
- 2008: Hunkeler macht Sachen
- 1992: Kinder der Landstrasse, Swiss-Austrian-German movie by Urs Egger
- 1991: Die letzten freien Menschen, documentary by Oliver M. Meyer

== See also ==
- American Indian boarding schools (United States)
- Stolen Generations (Australia)
- Canadian Indian residential school system (Canada)
- Native schools (New Zealand)
- Norwegianization (Norway)
- Kidnapping of children by Nazi Germany (Nazi Germany)
- Persecution of Uyghurs in China (China)
- Tinker Experiment (Scotland)
- Child Abductions in the Russo-Ukrainian War (Russia)
- Yemenite Children Affair (Israel)
