= Verdingkinder =

Swiss indentured child laborers

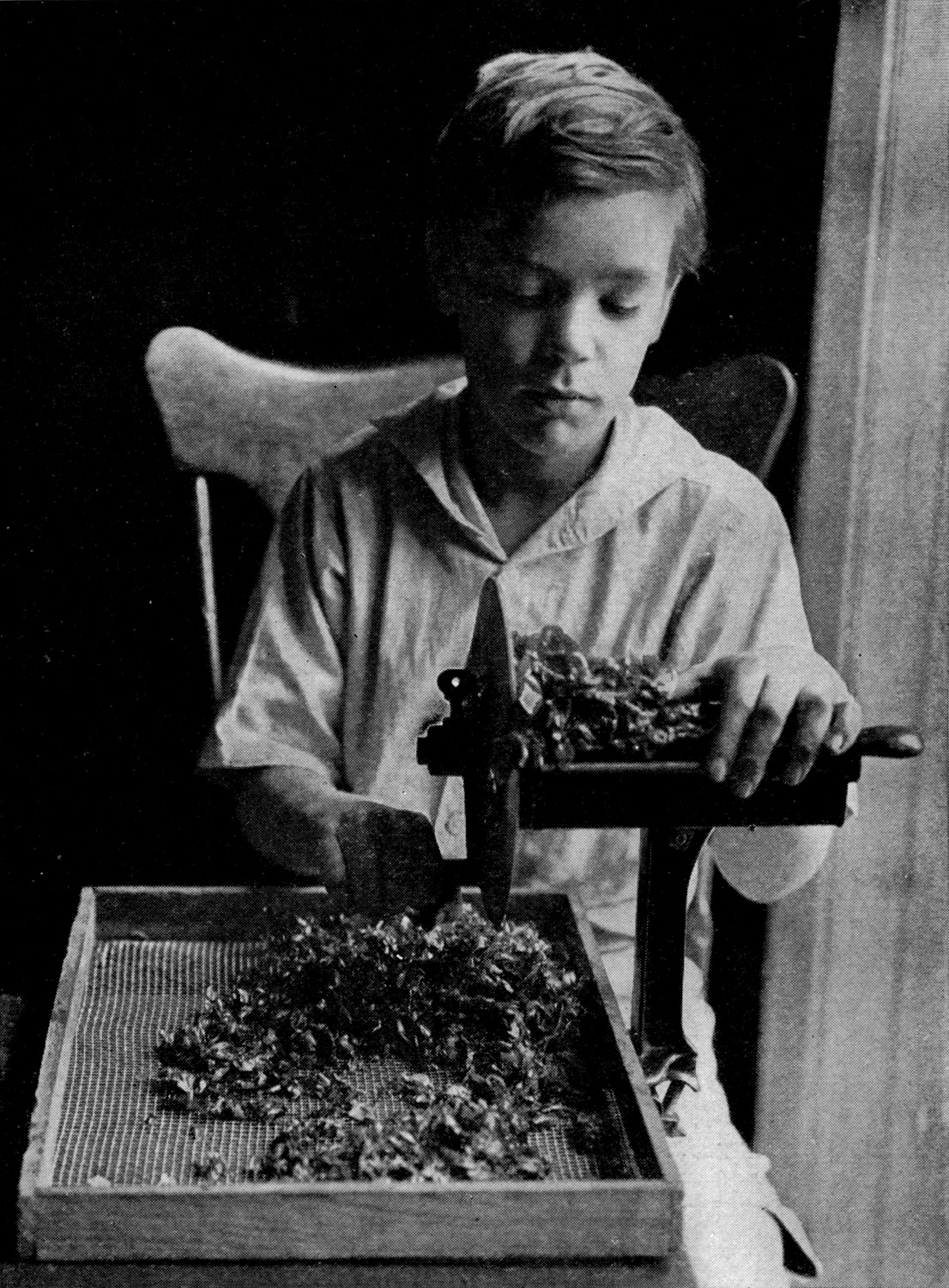
A child slicing Swiss chard leaves prior to drying them on the stove or sun drier, Switzerland, 1917

Verdingkinder, Verdingsbuben, "contract children", or "indentured child laborers" were children in Switzerland who were removed from their families by the authorities due to poverty or moral reasons (e.g. the mother being unmarried, very poor, of Yenish origin, neglect, etc.), and placed in foster families, often poor farmers who needed cheap labour. In the early 2000s, many of these children, by then adults, publicly stated that they had been severely mistreated by their foster families, suffering neglect, beatings and other physical and psychological abuse. The Verdingkinder scheme was common in Switzerland from the 1800s until 1981.

== History ==
The practice of Verdingkinder began in the Late Middle Ages, and evolved out of the practice of apprenticeship. Orphanages did not appear until the seventeenth century. Until the beginning of the 20th century, the children were often auctioned off at public markets and awarded to the families asking for the lowest pensions, a practice criticised by reformers such as Johann Heinrich Pestalozzi. These auctions ended with the professionalisation of social care and the adoption of the Swiss Civil Code in 1912, though some cantons (such as Lucerne in 1856) had abolished them before that.

Investigations by historian Marco Leuenberger brought to light that in 1930 there were some 35,000 Verdingkinder; though he suspects the real figure was twice that much, and between 1920 and 1970 more than 100,000 are believed to have been placed with families or homes. In the 1930s, 20% of all agricultural labourers in the Canton of Bern were children below the age of 15, though not all of these would have been Verdingkinder.

The placement of children as labourers in farming families died out in the 1960s and 70s as social work was further professionalised, inspection of foster families became more frequent, and greater emphasis was placed on keeping children with their original parents if possible.

The petition Wiedergutmachungsinitiative for a "restitution package of about 500 million Swiss Francs (£327m) for the 10,000 Verdingkinder estimated to be alive" was launched in April 2014 and acquired the 100,000 signatures necessary to become a national referendum.

An official apology was made on April 11, 2013, by the Swiss government.

== In culture ==
In 2008, Roland Begert, a Verdingkind himself, published his autobiographical novel Lange Jahre fremd, causing a stir in Switzerland, where authorities and the general public had previously shut their eyes. Begert's story told how disadvantaged youngsters were forcefully apprenticed and put to work in industry after the war, when there was a shortage of labour. In 2012 an exhibition called "Verdingkinder Reden" ('Contract Children Speak') toured Switzerland, drawing attention to the fate of these children. In the same year, Der Verdingbub ('The Foster Boy'), a feature film, was released, reaching number one at the Swiss box office.

== Situation today ==
Today, there is an estimated five-digit number of former indentured children (Verdingkinder) living in Switzerland who often have mental health problems. On 12 April 2013, the Swiss Minister of Justice, Simonetta Sommaruga, publicly asked the former Verdingkinder on behalf of the Swiss government for forgiveness for the human injustice they had experienced. She described the previous treatment of Verdingkinder as a violation of human dignity that could no longer be repaired. In Mümliswil (Canton of Solothurn), the Guido Fluri Foundation opened in 2013 the first national memorial in Mümliswil (the Mümliswil memorial) for children in foster care and Verdingkinder.

After no efforts were made by the state to provide compensation, Guido Fluri launched the reparation initiative (Wiedergutmachungsinitiative) in April 2014. It called for the establishment of a fund of 500 million Swiss francs for the benefit of victims of Verdingung. As an indirect counterproposal to the initiative, the Federal Council proposed in June 2015 that 300 million Swiss francs be made available for compensation. On 27 April 2016, the Swiss National Council approved the proposal to award the surviving victims of forced child labor the right to receive up to 25,000 francs as compensation. On September 15, 2016, the Swiss Council of States also approved this proposal.

== See also ==
- Kinder der Landstrasse
- Wiedergutmachungsinitiative
- Home Children
