= Lisa Tetzner =

German-born Swiss children's book writer

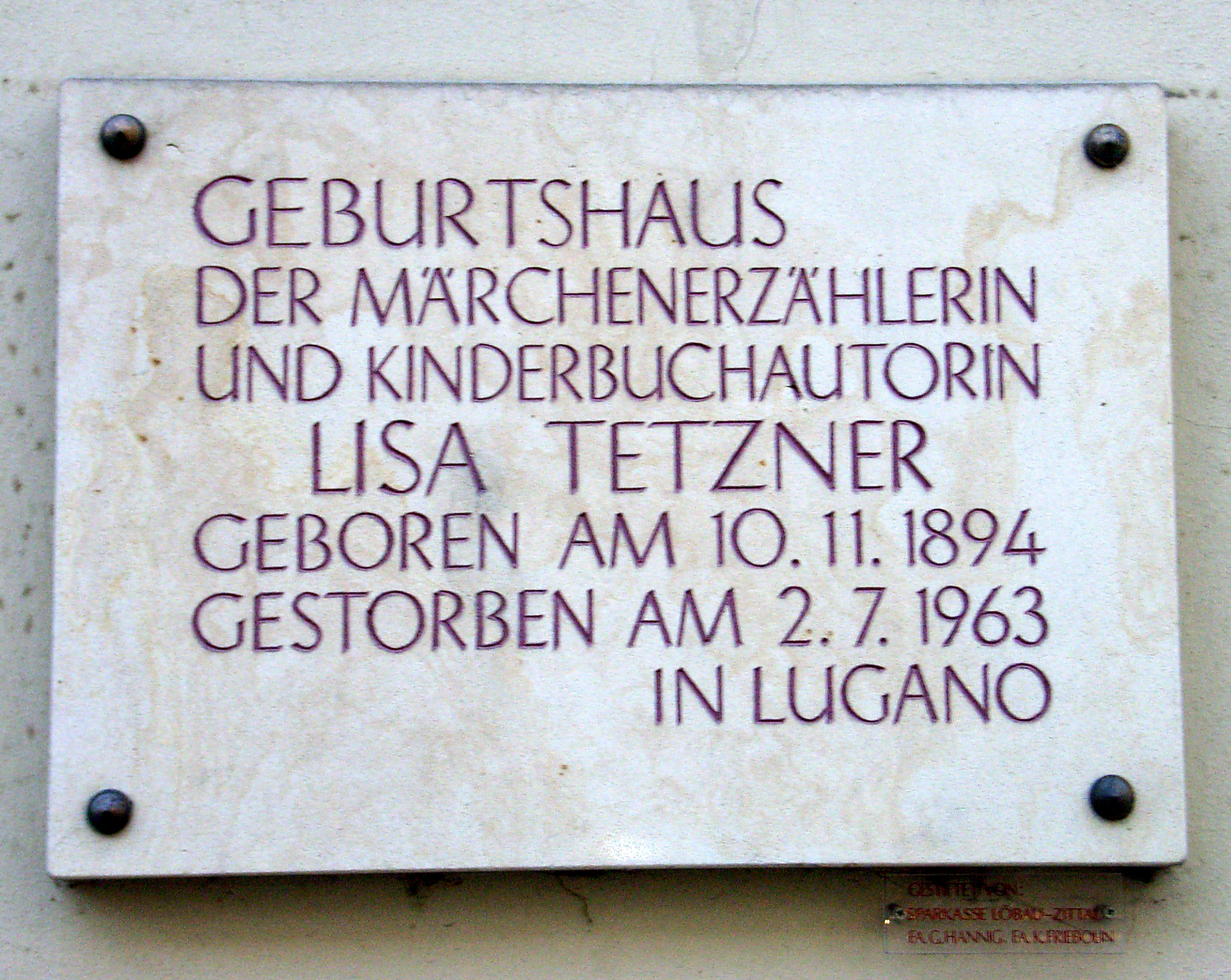
A plaque in Zittau noting her place of birth

Lisa Tetzner (10 November 1894 in Zittau, Saxony – 2 July 1963 in Carona, Switzerland) was a German-born Swiss children's book writer known for her work with fairy-tales. In 1924 she married Kurt Held, a Jewish Communist. They fled to Switzerland in 1933 to escape the Nazis and in 1948 became Swiss citizens. Her book, Die schwarzen Brüder was published in 1941. The Swiss censored her work fearing it may antagonise the wartime German government. Later her "socialist fairy-tales" became popular in East Germany. One of her best-known works is The Children From No. 67 series written as a collaboration with her husband. In the US Hans Sees The World was popular. It was a translation from her original German, published in 1934 by Covici-Friede.
