= Stereo camera =

Camera with two or more lenses for capturing stereo views

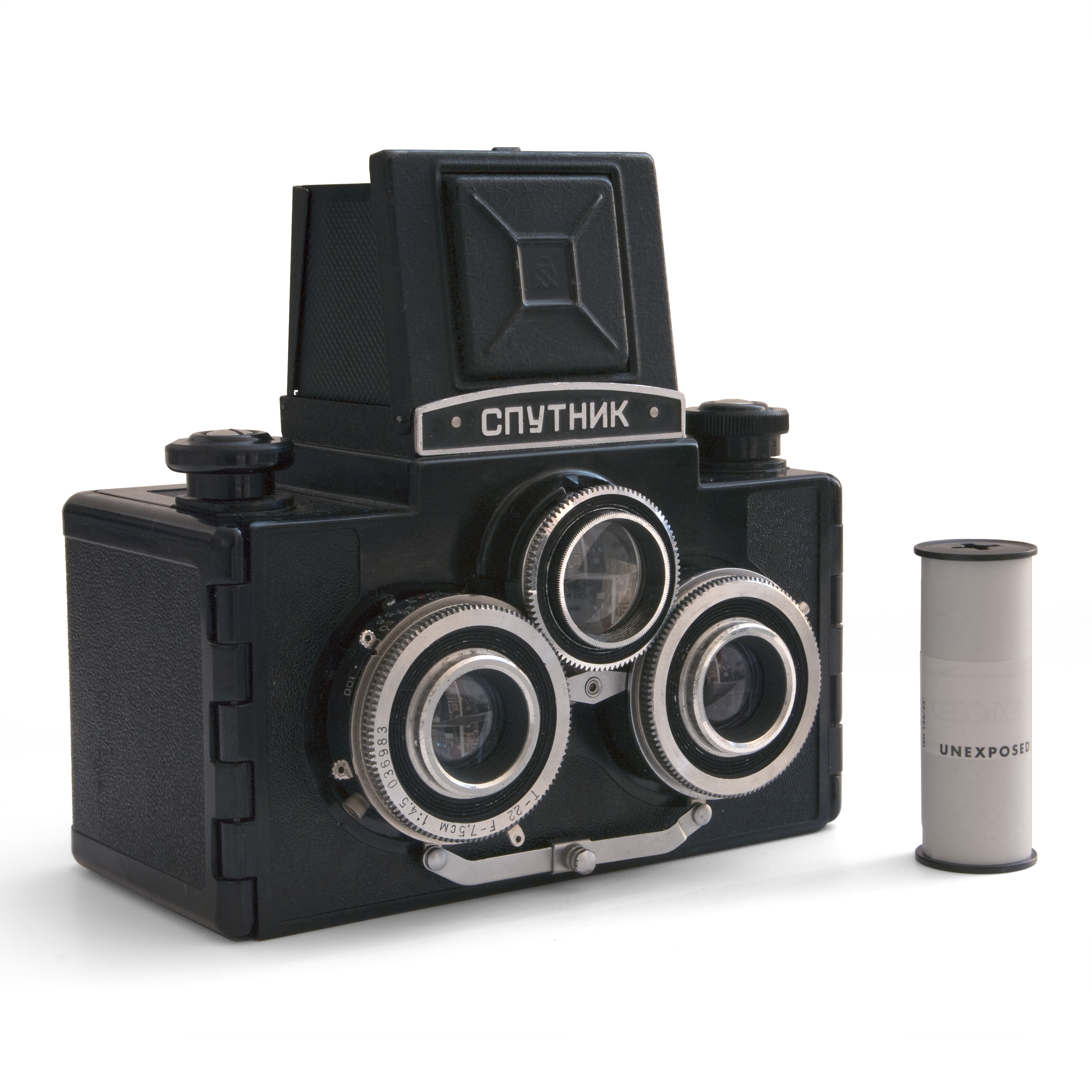
Sputnik stereo camera. The two lower lenses are used for the photograph, while the third lens is used for composition.

A stereo camera is a type of camera with two or more lenses with a separate image sensor or film frame for each lens. This allows the camera to simulate human binocular vision, and therefore gives it the ability to capture three-dimensional images, a process known as stereo photography. Stereo cameras may be used for making stereoviews and 3D pictures for movies, or for range imaging. The distance between the lenses in a typical stereo camera (the intra-axial distance) is about the distance between one's eyes (known as the intra-ocular distance) and is about 6.35 cm, though a longer base line (greater inter-camera distance) produces more extreme 3-dimensionality.

In the 1950s, stereo cameras gained some popularity with the Stereo Realist and similar cameras that employed 135 film to make stereo slides.

3D pictures following the theory behind stereo cameras can also be made more inexpensively by taking two pictures with the same camera, but moving the camera a few inches either left or right. If the image is edited so that each eye sees a different image, then the image will appear to be 3D. This method has problems with objects moving in the different views, though works well with still life.

Stereo cameras are sometimes mounted in cars to detect the lane's width and the proximity of an object on the road.

Not all two-lens cameras are used for taking stereoscopic photos. A twin-lens reflex camera uses one lens to image to a focusing/composition screen and the other to capture the image on film. These are usually in a vertical configuration. Examples include would be a vintage Rolleiflex or a modern twin lens like a Mamiya C330.

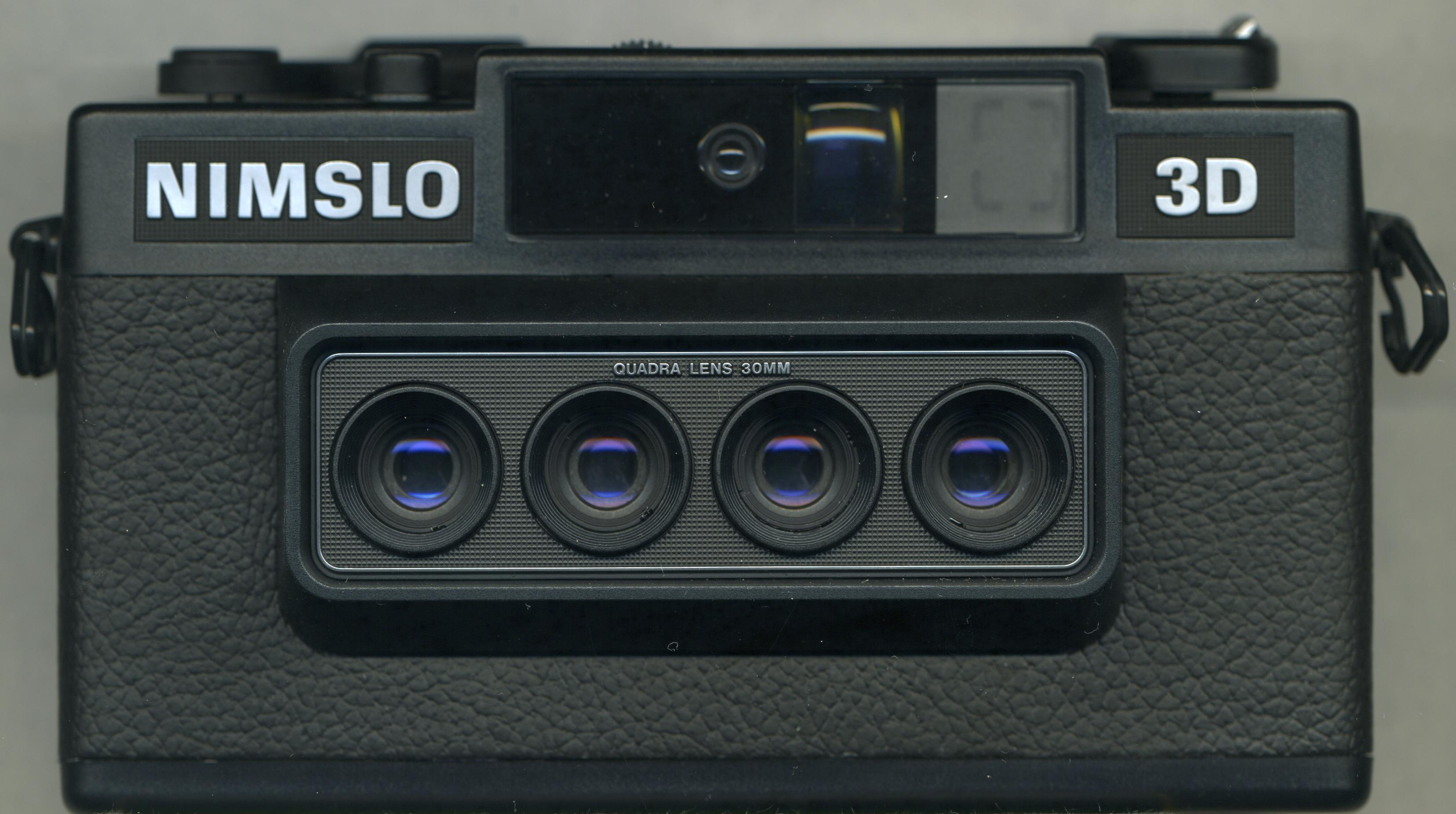
Nimslo quadralens lenticular

== Types of stereo cameras ==
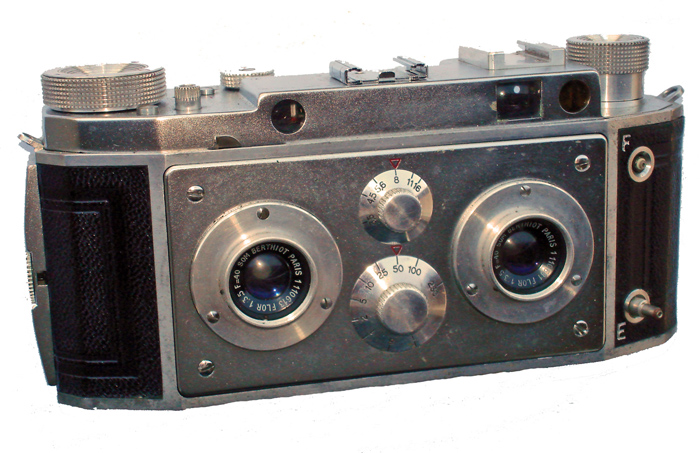
Vérascope 40

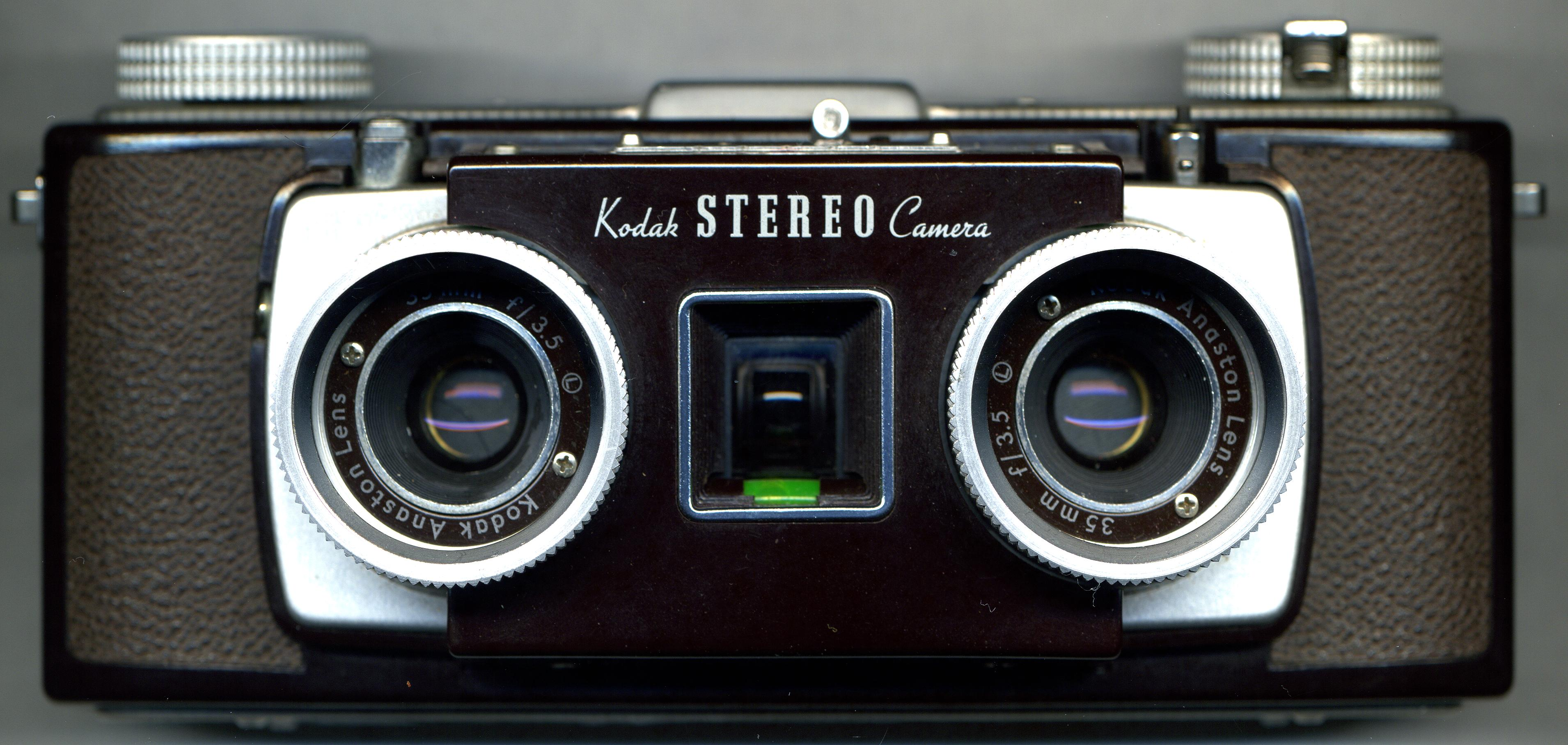
A Kodak stereo camera

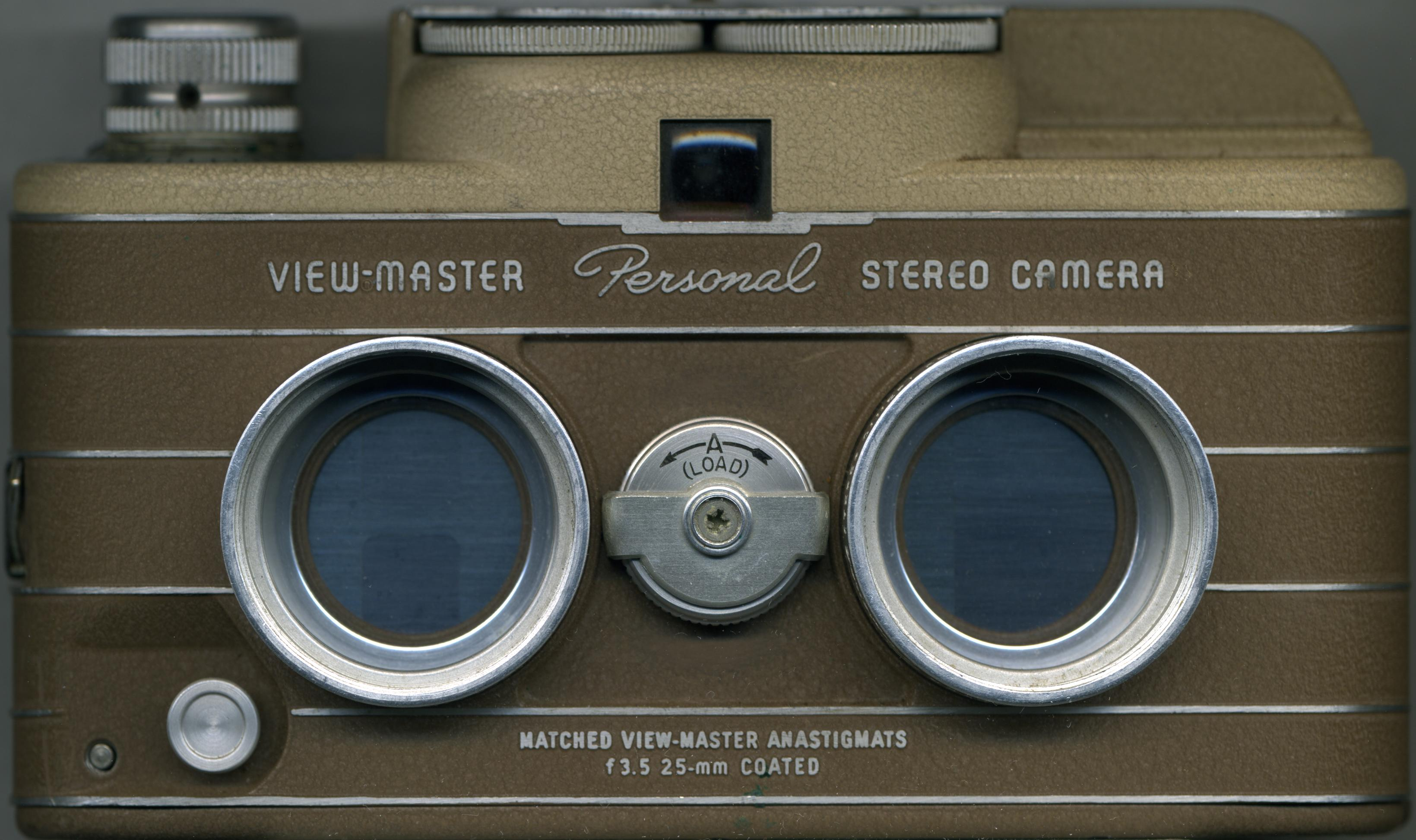
A View-Master Personal stereo camera

There have been many types of cameras that take stereo images, most of which are no longer manufactured. The most notable types are:

- Jules Richard Verascope, 1893.
- Kodak Stereo Camera – Kodak's own offering in the field of Realist format cameras which actually outsold the Realist during the five years it was available and might have eclipsed it in all time sales had it been introduced prior to the end of 1954.
- Loreo 3D Lens in a Cap (Hong Kong), an accessory device, which incorporates a pair of small closely spaced lens, and a simple mirror box as an attachment for many modern SLR digital cameras. The latest version has 25mm wider angle lenses. Loreo also makes currently, a cross-view 35mm film only, 3D CAMERA, (model 321) which takes "deeper" stereo images, with a wider mirror system, sold with a folding print viewer included.
- Nimslo 3D – The first compact consumer level lenticular camera, designed to take 3D prints that are viewable without glasses or special technique. Though it didn't "catch on" and was soon discontinued, it inspired many 3 and 4 lens clones marketed well into the 1990s.
- RBT – In the modern 3D world, a several thousand dollar RBT camera was made in Germany by rebuilding two 35mm high end cameras into an integrated and unitized stereo camera. RBT announced the discontinuation of the cameras on January 1, 2011.
- Stereo Realist – The original "Realist Format" camera, first sold in 1947, which inspired many imitators who introduced cameras capable of producing the 5P stereo slides which remain fairly popular to this day.
- Stereocrafters - Videon – The Videon is a 35mm stereo camera comprising a bakelite-type plastic body with metal top and bottom plates, produced by Stereocrafters of Wisconsin, USA, in the 1950s. It made 16 stereo pairs on 20-exposure 35mm film.
- View-Master Personal Stereo Camera – Introduced in 1952, this camera allowed individuals to make their own personal View-Master reels, either by using the commercial processing services available at the time or by using the custom cutter and blank reel mounts.
- Fujifilm FinePix Real 3D W1, a digital stereo camera.

In 2009, 3D technologies experienced a resurgence, including stereo cameras, with continuing developments in plenoptic camera technologies, as well as the emergence of stereo digital camera products such as the Fujifilm FinePix Real 3D series and the Minoru 3D Webcam.

Since 2014, computer vision developments and increasing embedded GPU computing power have opened up new applications for stereo cameras. These can be used to calculate a depth map through advanced image processing techniques. In April 2015, Intel has revealed a camera that can fit in a smartphone to serve various depth sensing applications such as changing the focus of a photo after it has been taken, 3D scanning and gesture control.

== Digital stereo bases (baselines) ==
There are different cameras with different stereo bases (distances between the two camera lenses) in the nonprofessional market of 3D digital cameras used for stills and video:

- ? mm Inlife-Handnet HDC-810
- 10 mm Panasonic 3D Lumix H-FT012 lens (for the GH2, GF2, GF3, GF5, GF6 cams and also for the hybrid W8 cam).
- 12 mm DXG-5D8 cam and the clones Medion 3D and Praktica DMMC-3D.
- 15 mm Ararat Macro Beam Splitter for smartphones.
- 15 mm Hydrogen One Smartphone.
- 15 mm Lume Pad by Leia Inc.
- 20 mm Sony Bloggie 3D.
- 23 mm Loreo 3D Macro lens.
- 25 mm LG Optimus 3D, LG Optimus 3D MAX (smartphones) and the Cyclopital3D close-up macro adapter (for the W1 and W3 Fujifilm cams).
- 28 mm Sharp Aquos SH80F and SHI12 (smartphones) and the Toshiba Camileo z100 camcorder.
- 30 mm Panasonic 3D1 camera, Camex 3D cam and LG IC330 (LG Cinema 3D camcorder).
- 32 mm HTC Evo 3D smartphone.
- 35 mm JVC TD1, DXG-5G2V, VTech Kidizoom 3D, GoPro HD Hero kit 3D, Nintendo 3D, Vivitar 790 HD (only for anaglyph stills and video), and AEE 3D Magicam.
- 40 mm Ararat Beam Splitter for smartphones and 3D Aiptec camcorders (Aiptek I2 -also the Viewsonic clone-, Aiptek I2P, Aiptek IS2 and Aiptek IH3 3D cams).
- 42 mm HOOT 3D VR Camera.
- 50 mm Xreal Beam Pro without 3D screen.
- 50 mm Loreo for full frame or non digital cams, and the 3D FUN cam of 3dInlife (also the clones Phenix PHC1, Phenix SDC821 and Rollei Powerflex 3D).
- 55 mm SVP dc-3D-80 cam (parallel & anaglyph, stills & video).
- 60 mm Minoru 3D Webcam, Vivitar 3D cam (only for anaglyph pictures), Camex3D(World first three-lens digital-3D-cam, 30,60mm bases)
- 65 mm Takara Tomy 3D ShotCam.
- 75 mm Fujifilm W3 cam.
- 77 mm Fujifilm W1 cam.
- 84 mm Sony Digital Recording Binoculars DEV-50
- 88 mm Loreo 3D lens for digital cams.
- 105 mm Ararat13(eBay)-beamsplitter for APS-C(also FF?) and Compactcams. similar Kula3d-Deeper.
- 120mm Stereolabs ZED2i passive stereocamera. IP66 certified RGBD depth camera with 120 degree FOV and great depth range (from 0.2m to 35m)
- 140 mm Cyclopital3D base extender for the JVC TD1 and Sony TD10.
- 200 mm Cyclopital3D base extender for the Panasonic AG-3DA1.
- 214 mm Cyclopital3D base extender for the Sony Digital Recording Binoculars DEV-50.
- 225 mm Cyclopital3D base extender for the Fujifilm W1 and W3 cams

== Use of multiple cameras ==
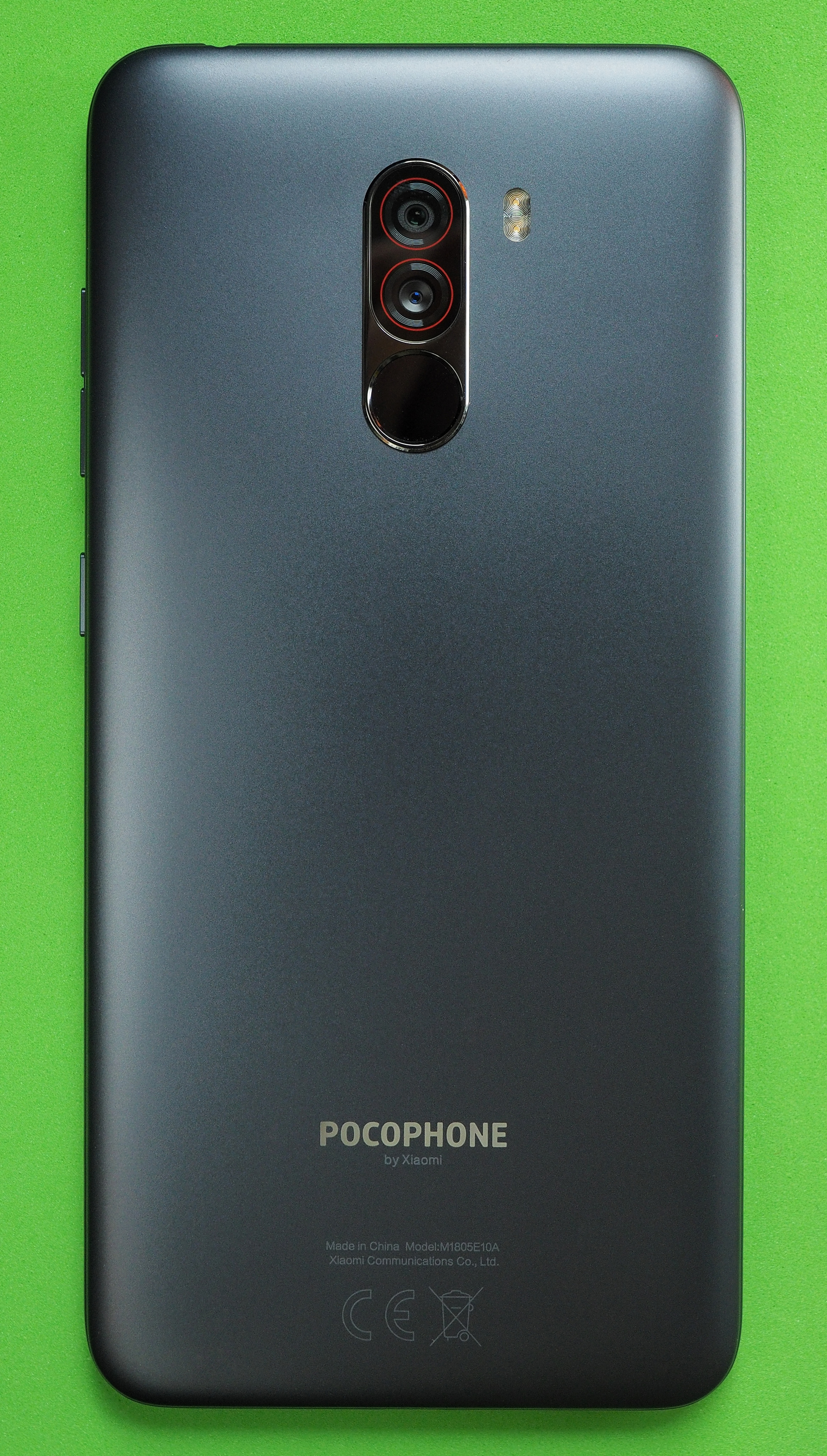
Dual camera of smartphone Xiaomi Pocophone F1

=== Dual cameras ===
Modern low cost digital cameras, and even DSLR cameras, can be mounted in pairs, with both triggered simultaneously. For nonmoving images this can be done by pressing both camera actuating buttons simultaneously, but this is not sufficiently accurate for moving objects. Certain camera models can accept modified programming from an image chip, and the software to trigger a slave camera from a master has been developed as open source software. A popular example of this technology is in the Samsung Galaxy S4, which allows photo capture simultaneously.

In 2023, the iPhone 15 Pro was announced to be the first iOS device capable of stereoscopic photo and video capture.

== Use of one camera and one lens ==
In late 2012, Samsung announced its NX300 camera. Using just one (optional) lens, this camera can take 2D photos, 3D photos, or Full HD movies, simply by changing the mode. The optional lens is a proprietary, 45mm f/1.8 prime lens. The NX300 has two LCD screens in the optical path which are used to "black out" their respective half of the lens, sending a slightly different image to the sensor.

Another method is used by Sony and Panasonic. With burst captures, the camera should be shifted sideways about 10 centimeters and the camera will choose the two best images with which to create a 3D MPO file. The depth is not as good, but can certainly allow the differentiation of what is in front and what is behind.

Pentax and Kúla 3D have made stereoadapters, sometimes called beamsplitters, for stereoscopic photography with DSLR camera lenses.

== See also ==
- Computer stereo vision
- Stereo cameras
- Stereo photography techniques
- 3D camcorder
