= Kodak Stereo Camera =

35mm film stereo camera produced 1954-59

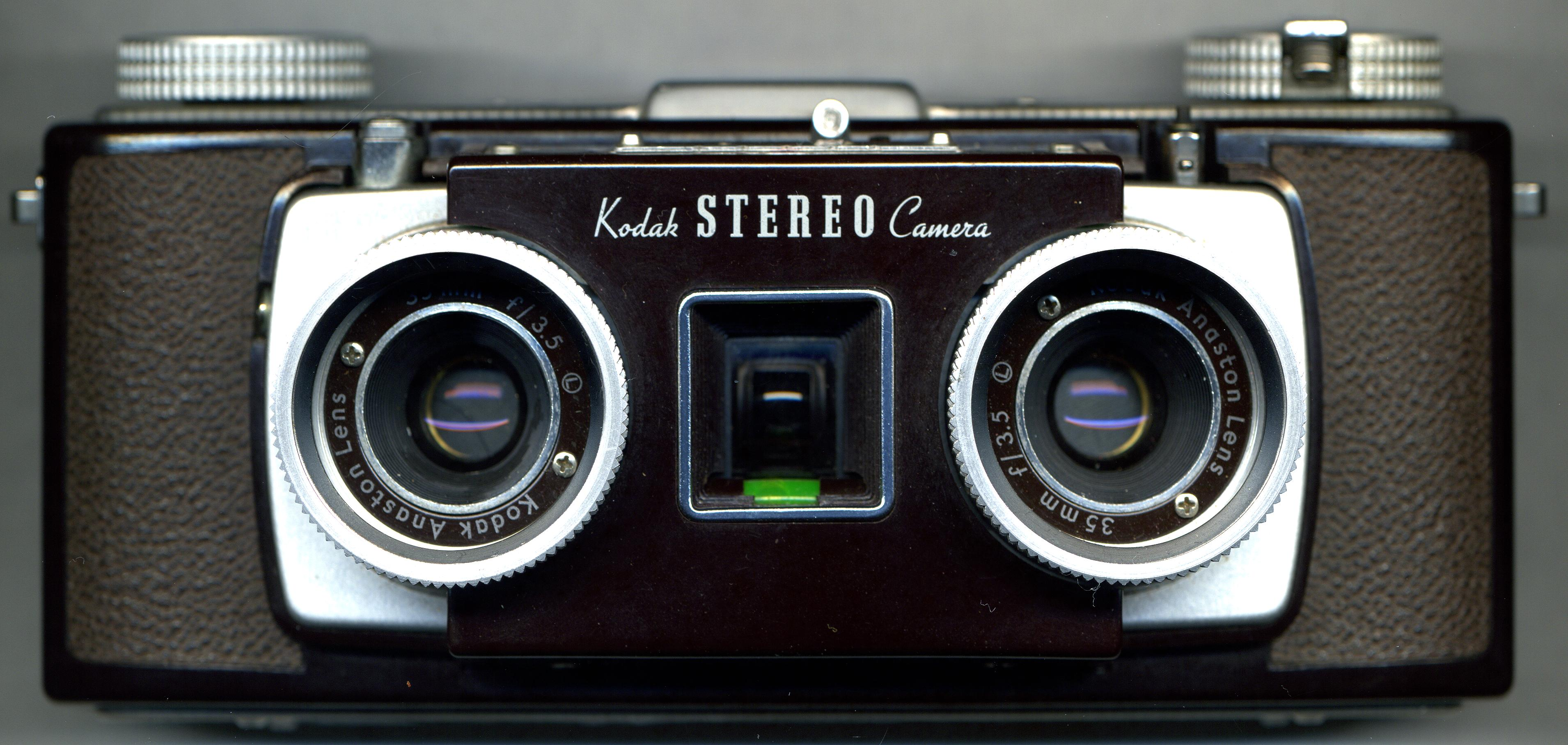
- Front view of a Kodak Stereo Camera

Overview
- Maker: Kodak
- Type: Stereo

Lens
- Lens: Fixed lens

Sensor/medium
- Sensor type: Film
- Sensor size: 35mm

Focusing
- Focus: Manual

Flash
- Flash: Bayonet

The Kodak Stereo Camera was a 35mm film stereo camera produced between 1954 and 1959. Similar to the Stereo Realist, the camera employed two lenses to take twin shots of scenes, which could then be viewed in dedicated image viewers. The lenses supported adjustable apertures and variable shutter speeds. The camera had a reputation for being easy to use, and sold approximately 100,000 units during the time it was produced.

== Description ==
The Kodak Stereo Camera was a Realist Format camera released late in 1954. It used 35mm slide film to produce stereo pair images in the standard 5P Realist format. This allowed Kodak Stereo Camera owners to use most accessories and services originally designed for the Stereo Realist. It was the second best selling stereo camera of the 1950s era, eclipsed only by the Stereo Realist.

== Features ==
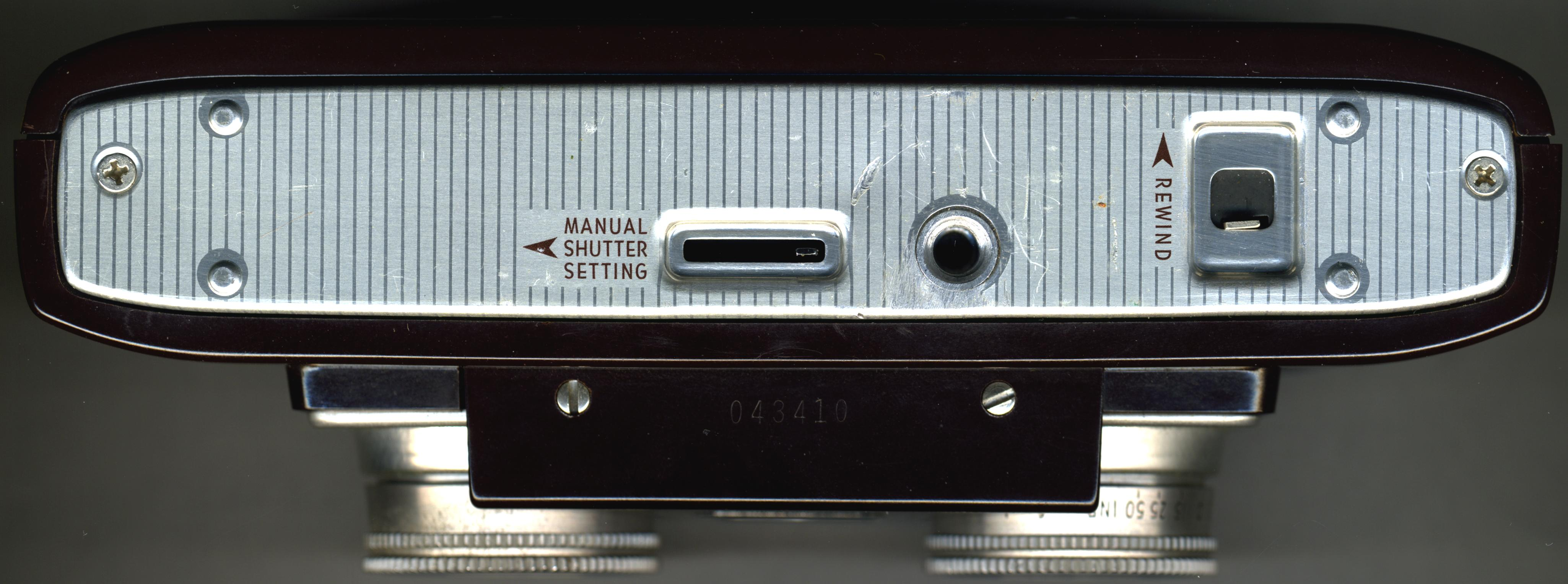
Kodak Stereo camera from the bottom, note the manual shutter cocking lever.

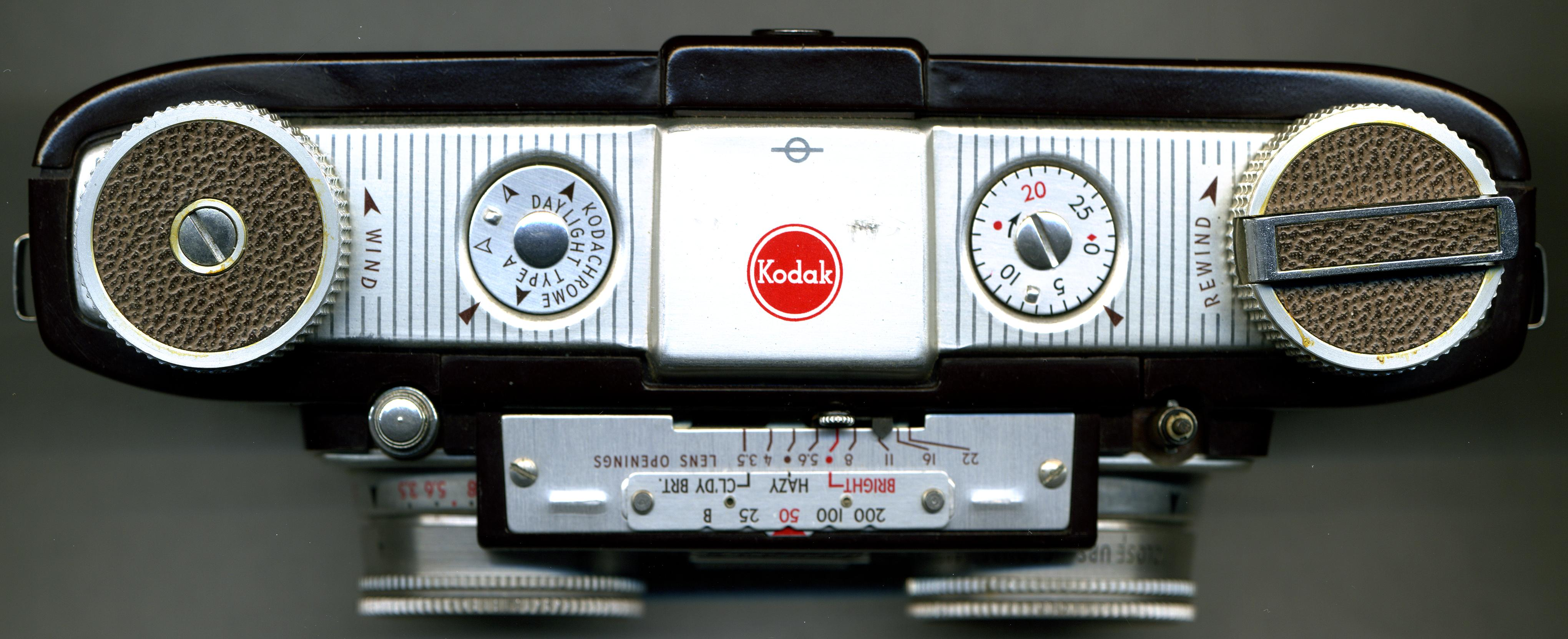
Kodak Stereo camera from the top

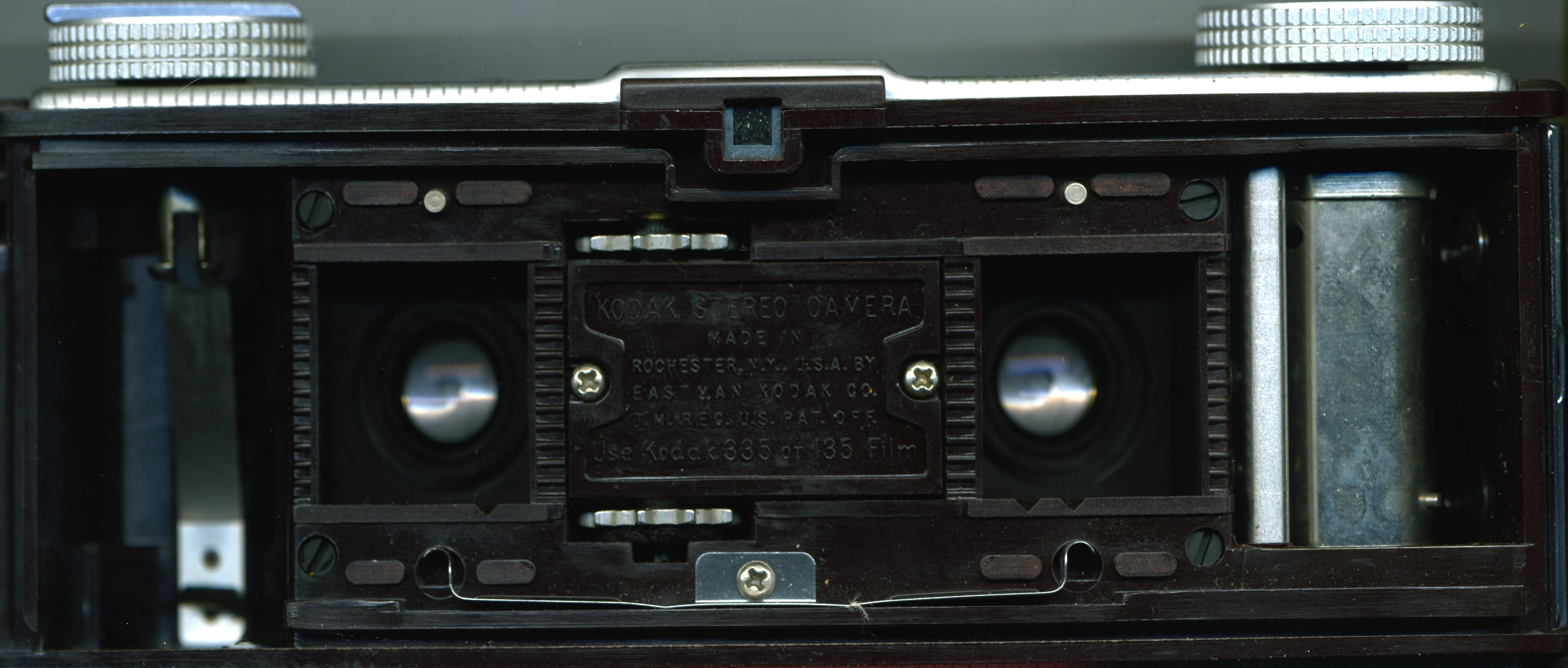
Kodak Stereo camera with the back removed, showing the film chamber.

Though it lacked a rangefinder the Kodak stereo camera is often considered to be easiest of the 50s stereo cameras to use.

Unlike the Realist, the Kodak had a self-cocking shutter. Like later model Realists it had built in double exposure prevention which could be overridden by the manual shutter cocking lever located on the bottom of the camera. Releasing the shutter also released the wind mechanism, so once a picture was taken the user needed only to wind the film to be ready for the next one. The rewind knob has a crank, which most consider an improvement over the ordinary rewind knob on the Realist.

The view finder lens was placed directly between the two taking lenses and placed at the same vertical level. This was made possible through the use of mirrors. This made framing shots easy. A spirit level was visible in the view finder, making it easier to avoid camera tilt, one of the pitfalls of stereo photography.

The film counter was the countdown type, which would be manually set when film was loaded according to how many pairs the roll could take. The number 20 was in red and there were red marks at 15 and 28, for use with standard 20 and 36 exposure rolls of film. A properly loaded 24 exposure roll of film will give 18 stereo pairs, but there is no special marking as 24 exposure rolls of film were not standard at the time the camera was produced. Opposite the counter was another manually set dial which indicated whether the cameras was loaded with "Daylight" film or "type A", though it had no film speed indicator.

The shutter speed and aperture controls are located at the top of the camera. Shutter speed control is through a sliding bar which is marked B 25 50 100 and 200. The number 50 is red, the other numbers are black. The other side, next to the f stop numbers, has markings that say BRIGHT (in red), HAZY and CL'DY BRT (both black). These words have lines pointing to different f stops, depending on where the shutter speed is set. The Aperture lever has 9 positive clicks labeled 3.5, 4, (black dot), 5.6, (red dot), 8, 11, 16, 22. The red dot indicated f 6.3. These exposure suggestions are based on ASA 10 (not 100!) film which in 1954 was still the standard film for color slides just as it had been when the Realist was introduced. The recommended setting for bright sun was a shutter speed of 1/50th with an aperture of f 6.3.

Focusing on the Kodak stereo camera is done by turning a dial located on the lens mount. The two dials are ganged so that they focus together and they can be focused by turning either dial. The right lens focus dial is marked with distances 4, 5, 6, 8, 10, 15, 25, 50, INF. Behind this dial is an arrow pointing at the point of focus and red marks showing the range of sharp focus for 3.5, 5.6, (red dot) and 8. The red dot corresponds to f 6.3. This is very similar to the depth of field scale on later model Realists. The left lens focus dial is marked "close ups", "groups" and "scenes".

The flash connector was different from other 50s era stereo cameras; instead of the then-standard old style hot shoe (usually called an "accessory clip") it featured a bayonet type connector, which was an emerging standard in the later 50s. Unlike the hot shoe, it couldn't support a flash unit on its own. A separate L bracket was needed to physically hold the flash.

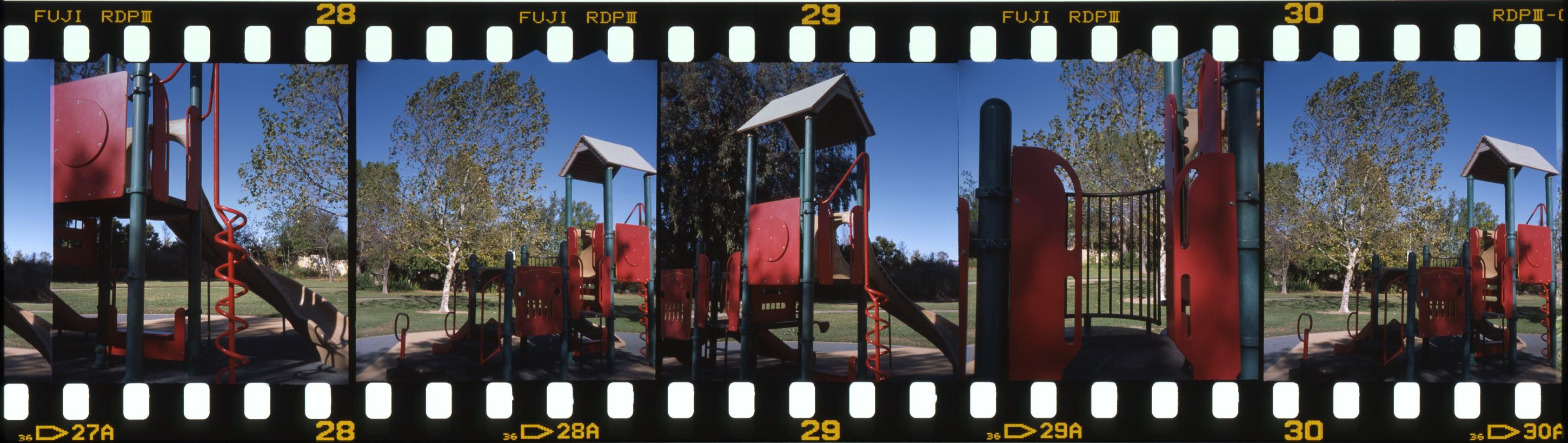
Image strip from Kodak stereo camera. The Kodak Stereo camera has a notch above the left eye image between P1 and P2 and above the right eye image it has a two notches, one between P3 and P4 and another between P4 and P5. Image 28A is the right eye image with 30/30A being the left eye image of the same pair.

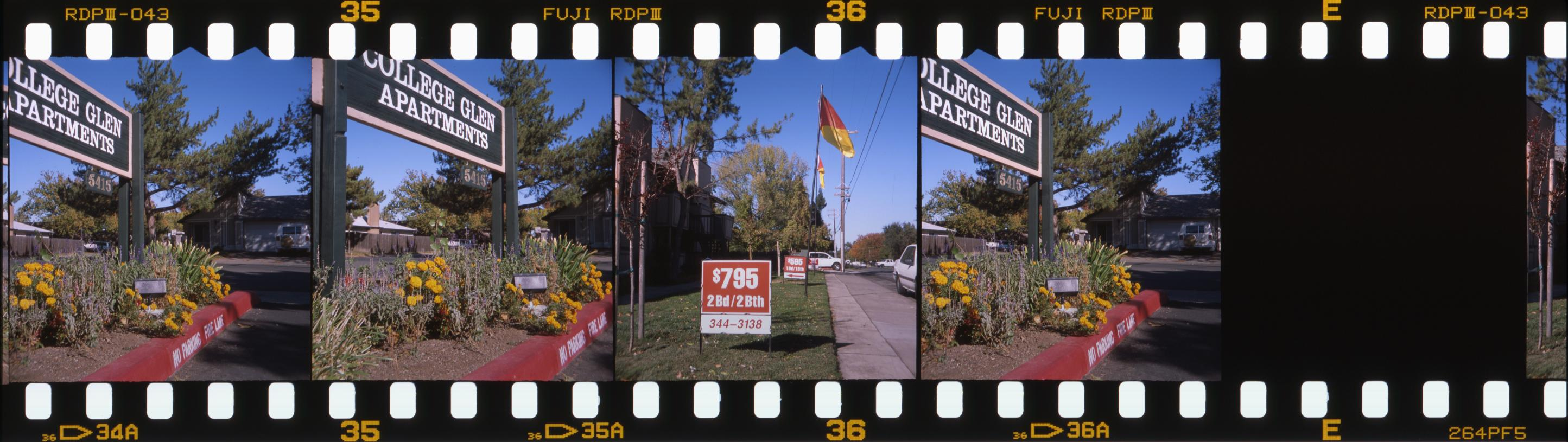
Another image strip from Kodak stereo camera. The last set of four images includes a blank frame as does the first set of four images. Image 36 is the left eye image of the final pair with the image to the right of the blank image E being the left eye image of the same pair. This image is complete but is only partially shown due to the limits of the scanner.

== History ==
Kodak had introduced its mounting service in 1953 and in the summer of 1954 began a huge advertising campaign for it. At about the same time they introduced their Kodaslide stereo viewers, but it wasn't until the end of 1954 that the Kodak stereo camera was introduced.

When The Kodak stereo camera was finally released at the end of 1954 it was an instant hit. The price tag, $84.50, about half the price of a Realist, certainly helped, but so did the ease of use, especially the self-cocking shutter, rewind crank, and controls easily set from the top. When this was combined with the trusted Kodak name, it is not surprising that it was sold so well.

For a while the Kodak Stereo camera was outselling the Stereo Realist and might have eclipsed the Realist in all time sales, had it been introduced sooner. But by the end of 1954 the public's fascination with stereo imaging was fading. Hollywood came out with only one 3D movie in 1955, and it was the last of the era. The stereo photography market was not hit as hard or as abruptly as some other stereoscopic industries, but the market slipped considerably after 1955, and the downward spiral continued over the next several years.

The Kodak stereo camera was produced until 1959 and an estimated 100,000 were sold. Kodak continued its stereo slide processing service into the late 80s, but it may well be that over half the slides processed through it were taken with Stereo Realists, which were produced until 1971.

== Accessories ==
The Kodak Stereo camera didn't have as wide a range of accessories as were offered for the Realist. Aside from the Kodaslide viewers already mentioned, Kodak also produced two flash units.

There was no deluxe model as with the Realist and the design of the camera remained essentially unchanged throughout its run. Home mounting kits seemed to be against the philosophy of the Kodak stereo camera and by then third party support for stereo slide mounting and storage was pretty well established. There was no Kodak Stereo projector either.

== Post 1959 ==
Kodak continued producing its Kodaslide stereo viewers for several years after it stopped producing the Kodak stereo camera. Kodak stereo camera users could continue to use the Kodak mounting service into the late 1980s.

Most third party support which Realist users enjoyed, including accessories and supplies, could be used with the Kodak stereo camera.

It is nearly impossible to determine which camera was used to produce a mounted stereo slide after the fact, but at least some of the stereo slides now eagerly sought by collectors were snapped with a Kodak, including many taken after 1959.

Kodak has not produced a stereo camera since 1959 and it seems unlikely that any film stereo will ever again bear the Kodak name. But Kodak's involvement with stereo imaging may not yet be over.

Several companies have announced digital stereo cameras which will hit the market soon. If history repeats itself, Kodak will wait till another company proves the ground before introducing its own offering. This time it may even catch on and stick around a while. It may well be that the "Stereo Realist" of the 21st century will be a Kodak camera.

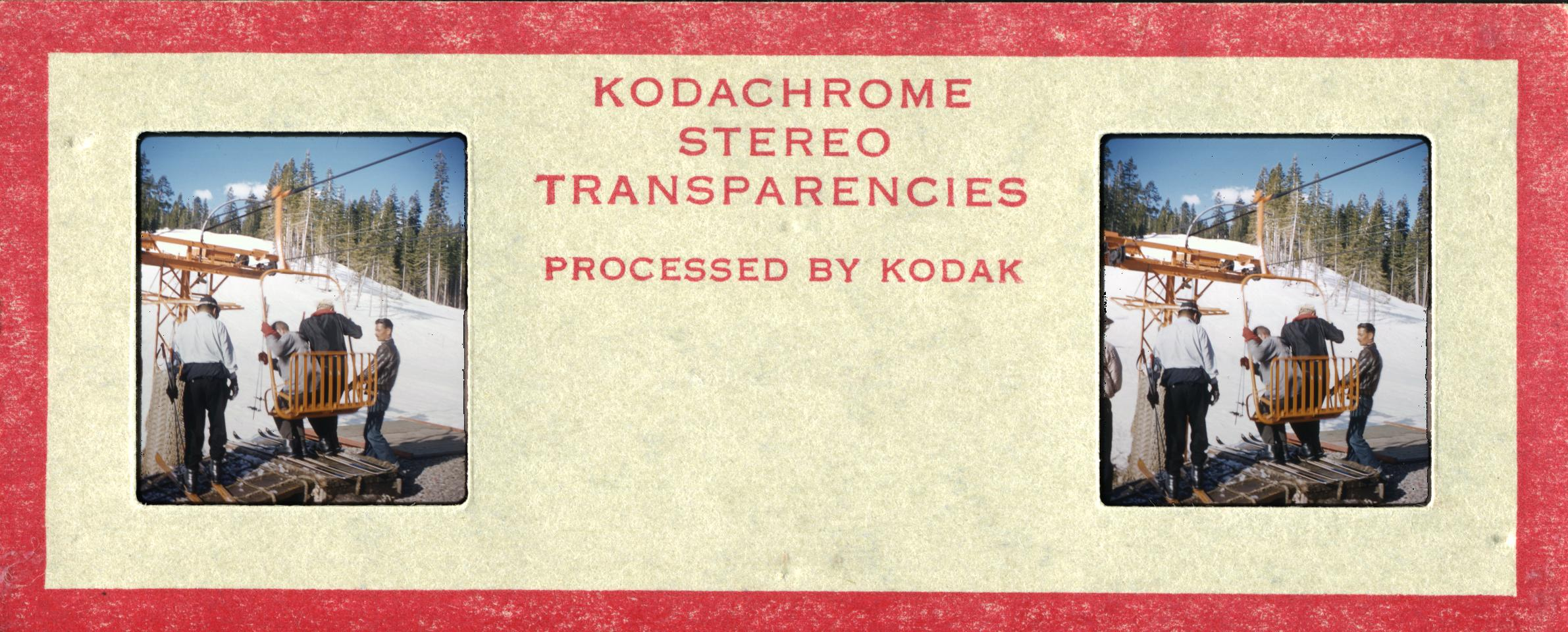
Standard mount used by Kodak through 1957. Note older color scheme. There was no embossed processing date.

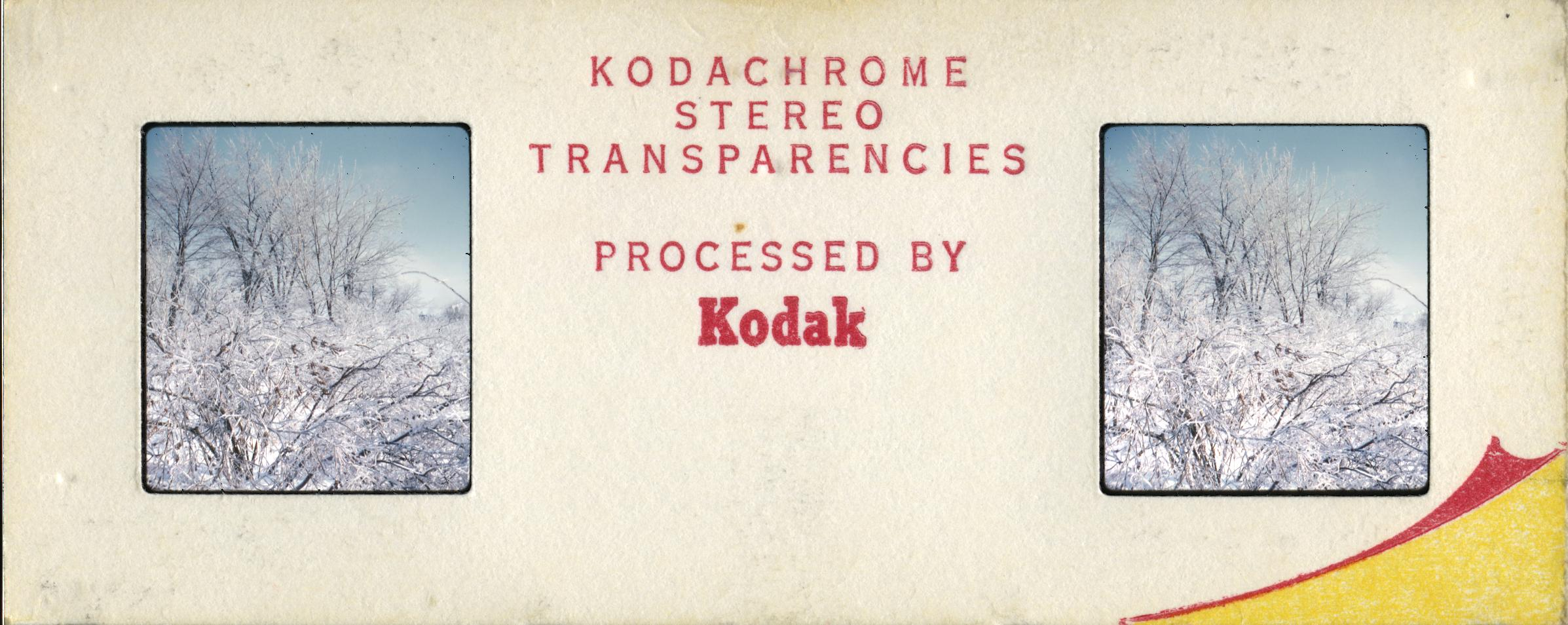
Standard mount used by Kodak after 1958, note the modern color scheme. Processing date was embossed on the other side.
