= Fujifilm FinePix Real 3D =

Line of digital cameras by Fujifilm

FinePix Real 3D W1/W3
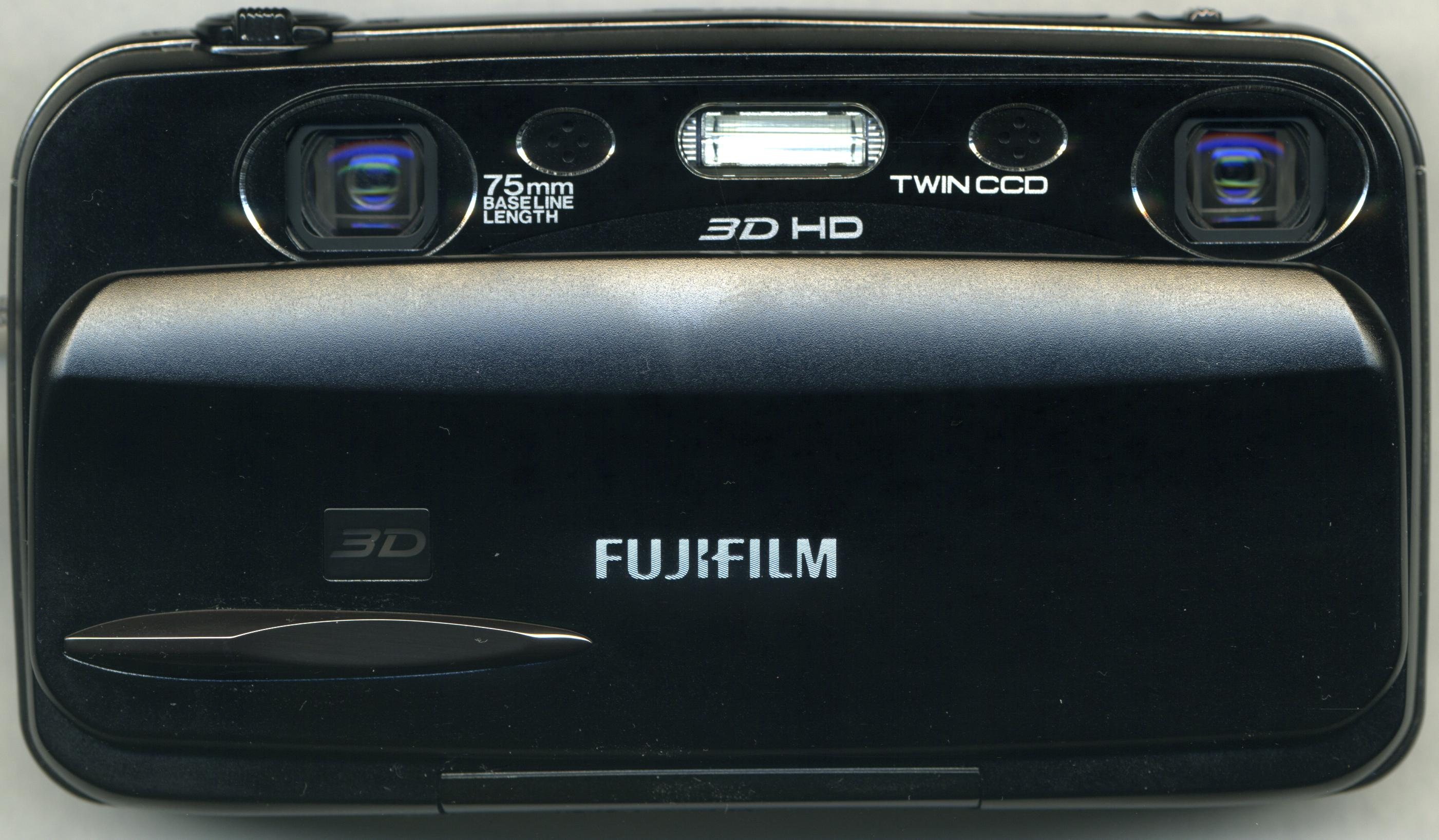
- FinePix Real 3D W3

Overview
- Maker: FujiFilm
- Type: Stereo

Lens
- Lens: Fixed lens 3x zoom 35-105mm

Sensor/medium
- Sensor type: Digital

Focusing
- Focus: Autofocus

Flash
- Flash: Built-in

The Fujifilm FinePix Real 3D W series is a line of consumer-grade digital cameras designed to capture stereoscopic images that recreate the perception of 3D depth, having both still and video formats while retaining standard 2D still image and video modes. The cameras feature a pair of lenses (offset left-to-right by a baseline that approximates the distance between an average pair of human eyes), and an autostereoscopic display which directs pixels of the two offset images to the user's left and right eyes simultaneously. Methods are included for extending or contracting the stereoscopic baseline (the distance between the left and right images), albeit with an asynchronous timer or manually depressing the shutter twice. The dual-lens architecture also enables novel modes such as simultaneous near and far zoom capture of a 2D image. The remainder of the camera is similar to other compact digital cameras.

== Marketplace ==
The W1 was the first digital stereo camera from a major manufacturer. The W1 was launched in July 2009, during an era in which 3D televisions and movies were becoming increasingly popular. Panasonic, Toshiba, Sony, and other manufacturers have announced their intention to release a number of 3D-capable devices. Although the W1 got some considerably unfavorable reviews and some photography experts predicted a commercial failure, the W1 seems to have sold far over Fujifilms expectations. Production of the camera ended in mid-2010 to introduce its successor, the W3 model.

== Hardware ==
The W1 has two lenses, each capturing color images at 10-megapixel resolution and each capable of 3x optical zoom (35mm - 105mm in 35mm camera equivalent). The color LCD on the rear of the camera measures 2.8" diagonal, with 0.23 megapixels. It can be electronically switched between normal display and autostereoscopic display. The two lenses can also be used to take two simultaneous shots of the same scene with different settings (zoom, ISO, etc.).

In August 2010, Fujifilm announced the W3, a new stereoscopic 3D compact point-and-shoot camera with the ability to capture 3D images and videos, the follow-up to the first-of-its-kind W1 with similar specs and design. The W3 features higher resolution (720p) and better nighttime performance as well as a better integrated autostereoscopic display. The image result is better than Panasonic's 3D add-on which uses two lenses, but feeds the offset image to a single sensor, so the resolution gets chopped in half, then stretched back to its full-width after the processor creates 3D effect.

== Initial adjustment ==
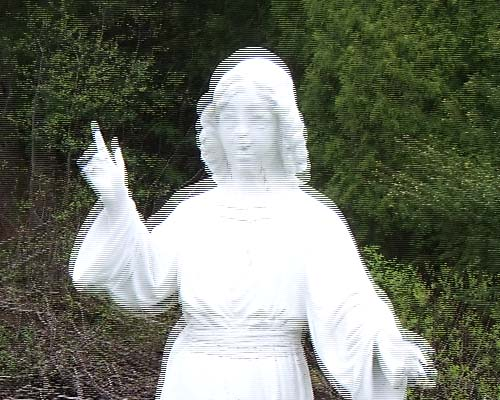
W3 with wrong vertical parallax

One of the initial adjustment overlooked by many new users is the lenses vertical parallax, that must not be confused with the horizontal parallax (set manually by the left rocker button). Although the lenses should be perfectly aligned, by design, there is a small vertical axis error inherent for each camera body. This error implies that all pictures (and videos as well) taken with a wrong vertical parallax are harder to look at, because one eye is looking up while the other is looking down. To effectively correct this optical discrepancy, the camera offers a vertical parallax correction in its menu system: MENU/SET/OPT AXIS CONTROL. The best way to use this adjustment is to zoom at maximum, take a picture, then analyse it with a software stereoscopic player (using row or column interlaced view) to obtain the subject at the same vertical level.

== File formats ==
Images are captured as pairs of still images, and are saved as Multi Picture Object (MPO) files, or an MPO file plus a JPEG file. This MPO file is basically two JPEG files joined together, but the MPO format can contain more than just two pictures. The camera can also capture video sequences, for which it uses "3D-AVI".

The MPO file format is a new file format which, though not proprietary, is not yet widely supported. It is supported by the free software image viewer Geeqie, as well as the freeware stereo photo-editing program Stereo Photo Maker (Windows), the free photo management program Daminion (Windows), the commercial program STOIK Imagic (Windows) and the shareware programs Stereomerger (Windows and Macintosh), Anaglyph Workshop (Windows and Macintosh) and MPO3DViewer (Macintosh). GoPro Cineform's Neo3D also now supports the Fuji video format. Neo3D converts clips into various formats including anaglyph and the "half side-by-side" required by YouTube and 3D TVs. The clips can then be joined etc. by most video editors and viewed on various stereo displays. Neo3D can be tried for 15 days.

== Model W3 ==
Encouraged by the reception of the W1, Fuji released a new model, the W3, in September 2010.

The W3 has a slightly smaller stereo base and the left lens is slightly further from the left edge of the camera, thus partially addressing two common complaints about the design of the W1. The W3 is also smaller and lighter and uses the smaller and lighter NP50 battery rather than the NP95 battery used by the W1.

The user interface is much easier to use with a ring selector similar to other compact digital cameras. The zoom control is in the form of a ring surrounding the shutter button, with the parallax control now in the form of a slider on top of the camera. 2D/3D selection is through a single button, as is the video mode.

A single button also selects play mode, for viewing pictures and videos. This can turn the camera on and off without the need to open and close the front lens cover. The sliding lens cover is similar to the W1 cover but is enhanced by a projection that makes opening and closing it easier.

The auto stereoscopic (lenticular) display is larger, with a 16:9 aspect ratio. It is also somewhat brighter. Both still and video modes default to 16:9, but the same 4:3 sensors are used as in the W1 so in 16:9 mode is actually 7.2 megapixels (3584x2016) vs 10 megapixels (3648x2736) in 4:3 mode. Video mode now defaults to 720p (1280x720 @24 frame/s) but can also do 640x480@30 frame/s and 320x240@30 frame/s.

Fuji reports that sales of the W3 have been going well, with 100,000 units selling in 2010 and 500,000 expected by September 2011. While this pales compared to other compact digital cameras, it will surpass the sales of the Stereo Realist and will probably make it the best selling stereo camera to date. The improvements in the design as well as the lower price, $499 USD suggested retail with street prices typically $300–$350 USD, along with the wider distribution channel have certainly helped sales.

== Samples ==
One of the criticisms of the Fuji W1 is the wide interocular spacing (77 mm) which would normally make closeups such as this cake unviewable. However, it is possible by backing off from the subject and using the 3X optical zoom to compensate for the wide interocular and take some decent closeup stereo shots.

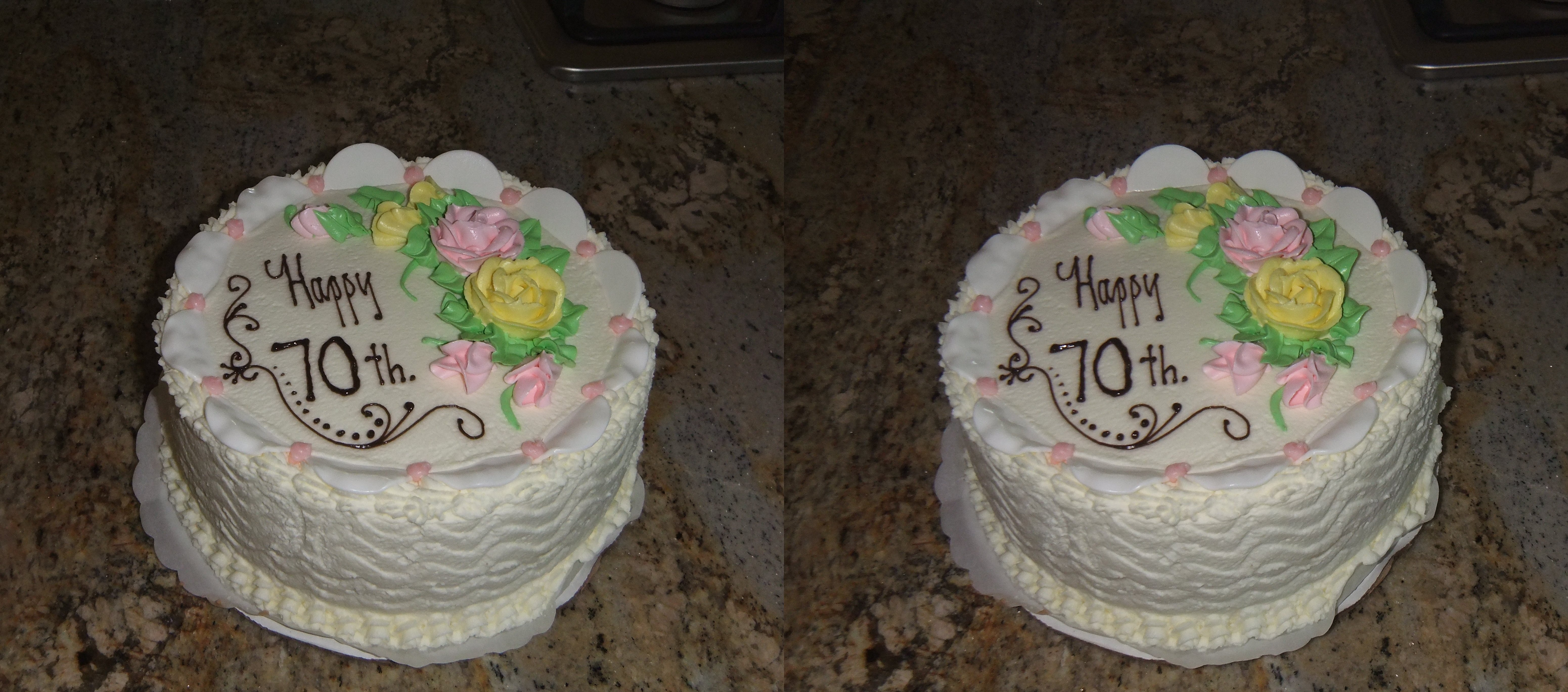

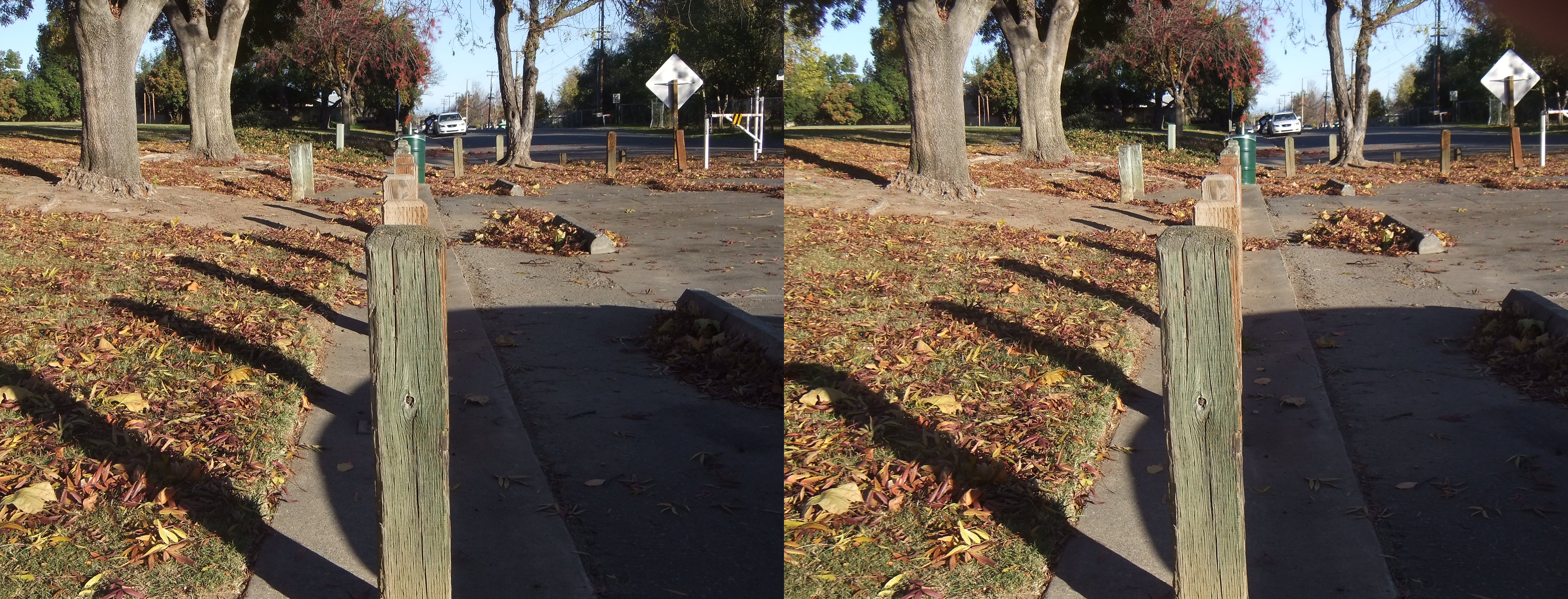

Image from W1, converted to JPG for uploading

== 3D in outer space ==
In December 2010 via the Russian spacecraft Soyuz on the mission Soyuz TMA-20, a European Space Agency astronaut brought the Fujifilm FinePix REAL 3D W1 aboard the International Space Station. The 3D anaglyph images have been uploaded to Flickr.

== Displaying ==
=== V digital photo frame series ===
In addition to the camera, Fuji also sold the Fujifilm FinePix Real 3D V1 digital photo frame capable for displaying stereoscopic images, typically those captured on the camera.

The product was launched in July 2009. The parallax-barrier autostereoscopic SVGA (2 channels × 400×600 pixels) display allows viewing of a stereoscopic image with the naked eye, and in full color. However, the technology is significantly less clear to view than that on the W1 camera.

Fujifilm introduced the FinePix Real 3D V3 photo frame with improved specifications in November 2011.

=== Printing service ===
Fuji also offered a stereoscopic printing service via mail until January 2016.

== See also ==
- Fujifilm FinePix cameras
- Digital camera
- 3D camcorder
- Stereoscopy technique
- JPEG file format
- Stereo camera
- Nintendo 3DS
