= Stereo Realist =

Binocular vision camera (1947–1971)

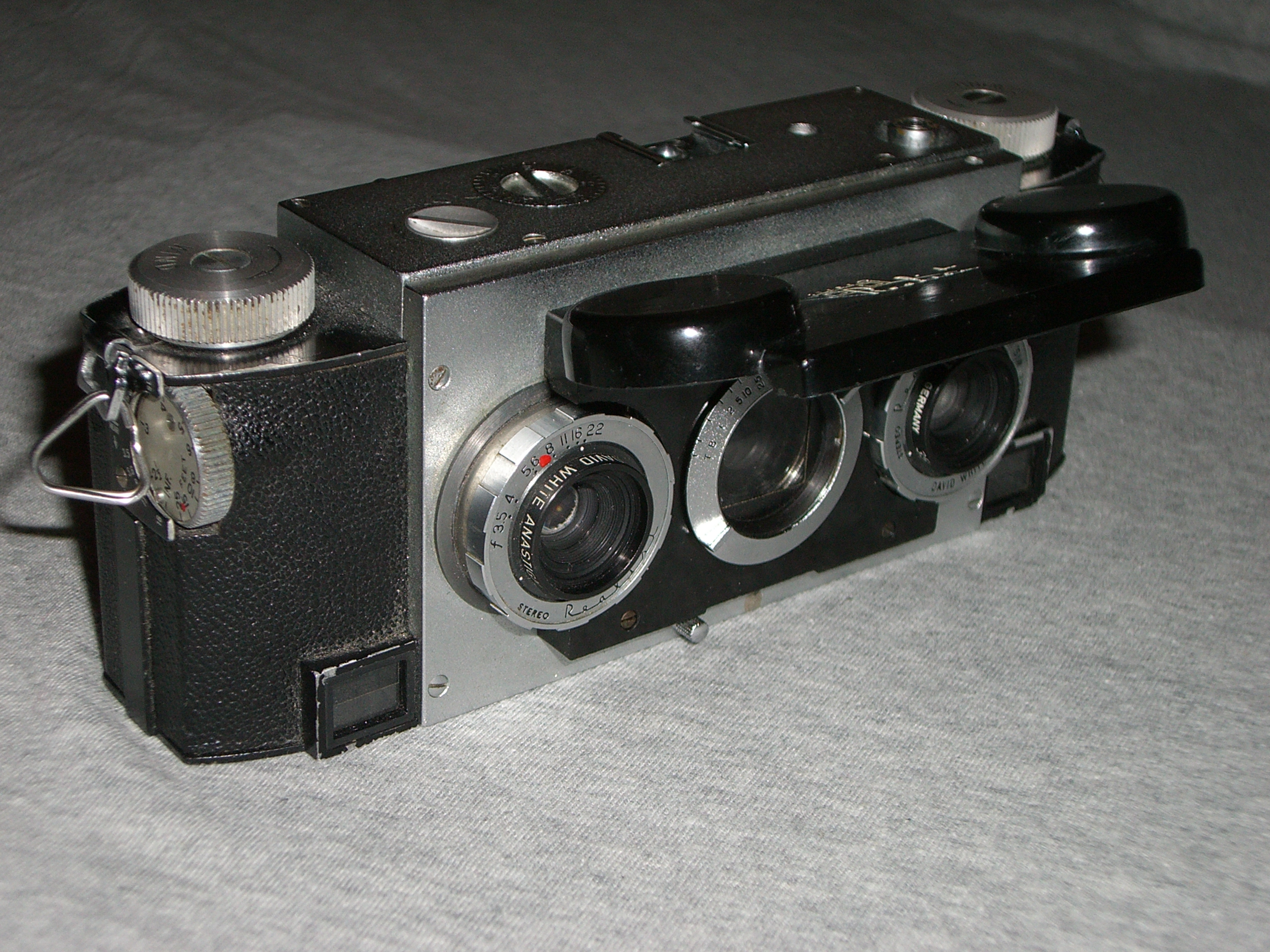
A Stereo Realist camera.

The Stereo Realist is a stereo camera that was manufactured by the David White Company from 1947 to 1971. It was the most popular 35 mm stereo camera ever manufactured and started the era of popular stereo photography of the mid 20th century.

== History ==
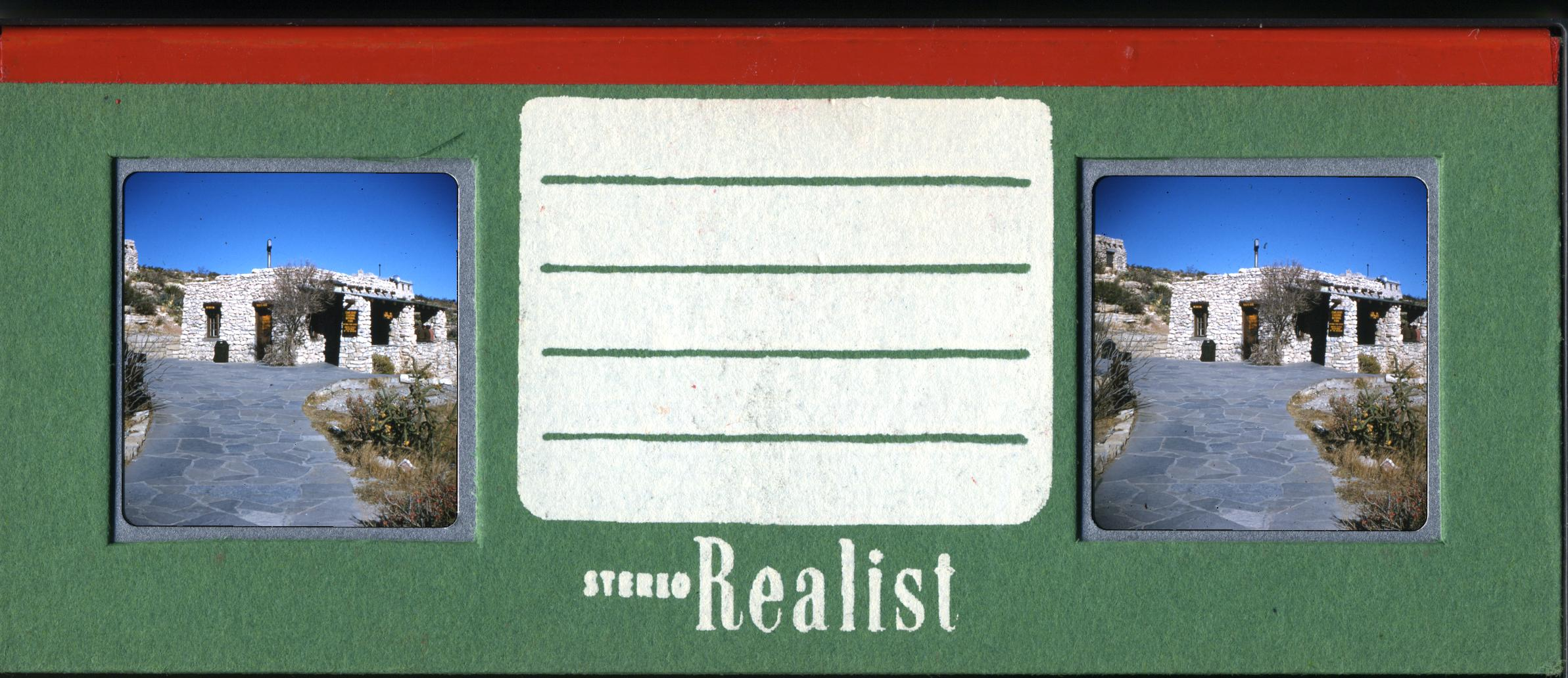
Slide mounted by the Realist mounting service.

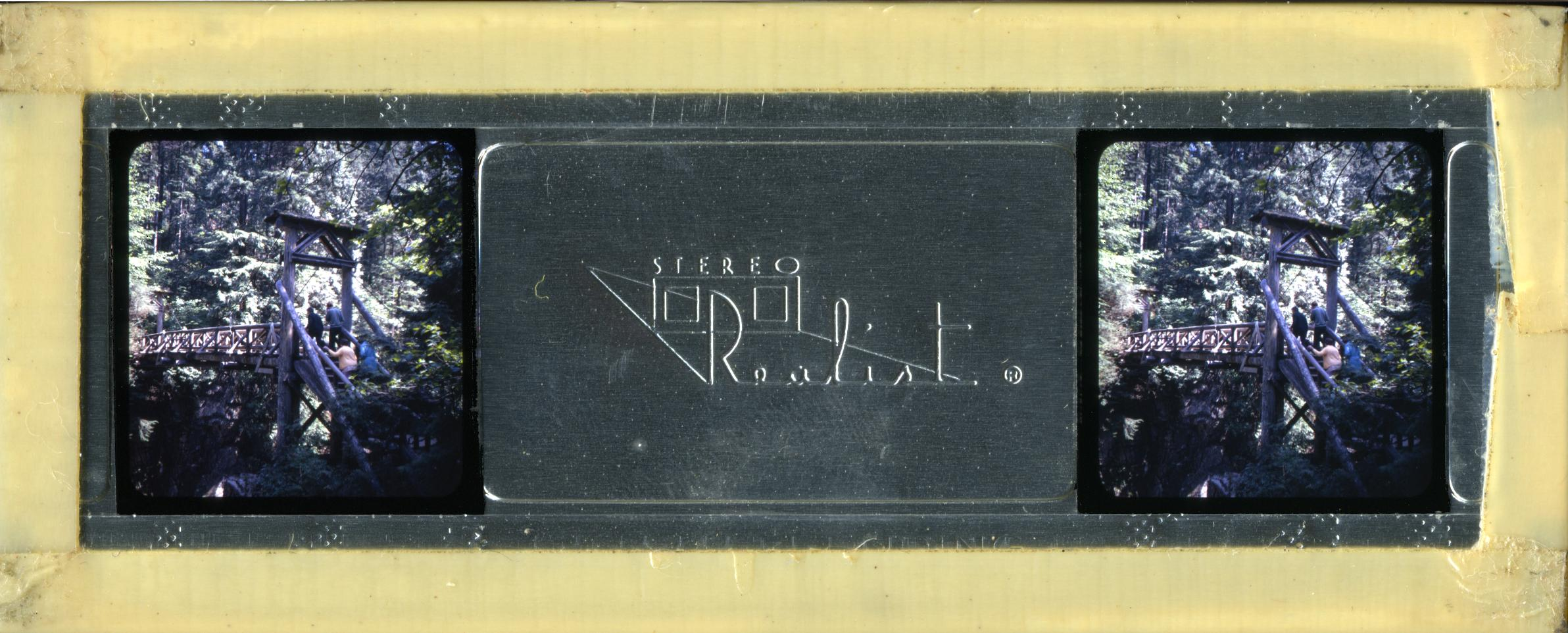
Slide mounted in glass and sealed with tape.

Seton Rochwite was a camera hobbyist who began designing and building his own stereo cameras in 1929. In 1938, he began working on a version suitable for commercial manufacture. The first prototype was ready in 1940. He brought it to the David White Company of Milwaukee who, interested in the design, hired him in 1943. The company began advertising the "Stereo Realist" in photography magazines in 1945, although it was not produced until late 1947.

The David White Company had great success marketing the Stereo Realist system to the public. In addition to the stereo cameras there were special slide viewers, projectors, film cutters, slide mounting aids, cases, and other accessories available. They also offered a stereo slide mounting service. Several camera models were offered over the years, some with premium lenses and features. The basic camera design was shared among all of them.

The Stereo Realist system proved so popular that Revere, Bell and Howell, Three Dimension Company (TDC) and Kodak marketed their own cameras using the same format. Some of the competitors' offerings had features that the Realist lacked or were easier to use, and most were less expensive, but none were as popular. The Kodak Stereo Camera in particular, which was both less expensive and easier to use, might have outsold the Realist, had it been released prior to the end of 1954.

By the mid-1950s, the public's fascination with stereo imaging was fading, and by 1960 the Stereo Realist was the only stereo camera of the 1950s era that was still manufactured. Realist production limped on at much-reduced numbers throughout the 1960s and finally ceased in 1971. The David White Company, which in the 1950s changed its name to "Realist Inc.", changed it back in 1990.

== Design and engineering ==
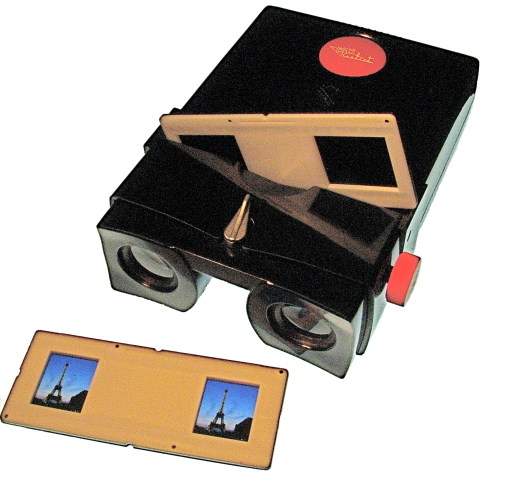
Stereo Realist Red Button viewer with slides

The Realist uses standard 135 film. The unusual proportions of the slides (the image was 5 sprockets wide) became the standard for 3-D slides, and is known as "5P" or "Realist Format". It marked a significant milestone in stereoscopy. The arrangement of images on the film (on cameras where film advances left to right 1R-blank-2R-1L-3R-2L-4R...) seemed arbitrary but allowed for a simple film advance mechanism with little film wastage. A special accessory was available that used the otherwise blank frame near the start of the roll to identify the roll, though the procedure for using it was rather elaborate.

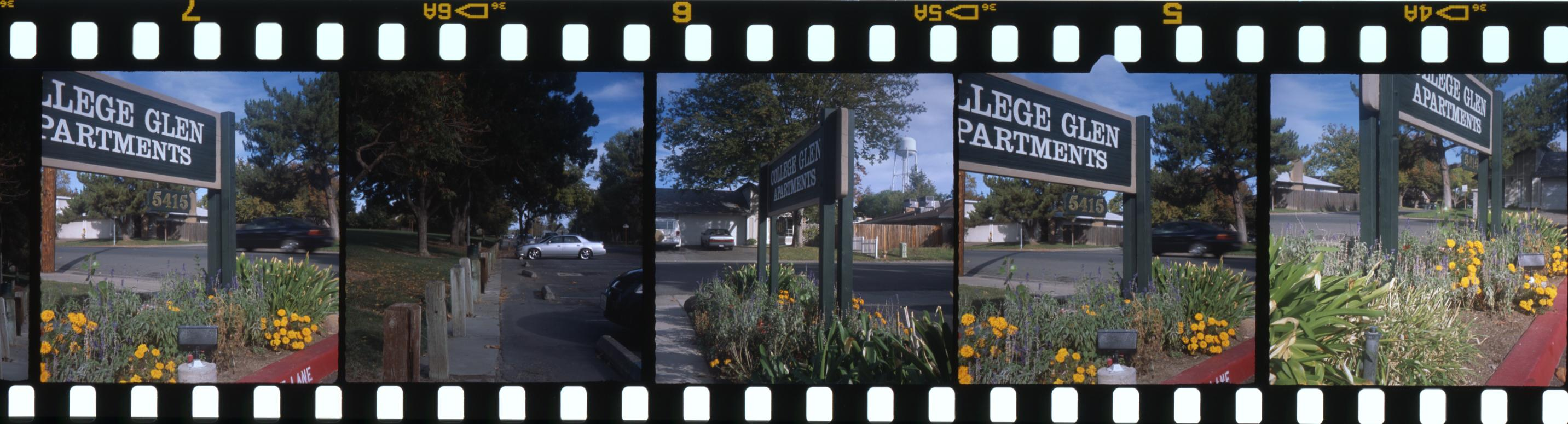
Image strip from a Realist 45 camera. Note the notch above image "5", which is the left eye image of a pair with image 7 being the right eye image of the same pair.

Because camera lenses invert the image and flip it left to right, orienting the film strip so that the image's "up" is up, and its "left" is to the left, the left-eye image of the stereo pair is to the viewer's right (see the included photograph). Note that in the Realist 45 the film cartridge is loaded on the right side of the camera, causing the images to be upside-down relative to the numbers. The standard Realist and Kodak Stereo Camera have the cartridge on the left side, so the images have the same orientation as the numbers.

The routine for taking a photograph with a Stereo Realist is elaborate, compared to a modern camera. One must lift the lens cover, focus, manually set the aperture and shutter speed, cock the shutter and then take the picture. The wind release button must be depressed briefly while beginning to wind the film to the next frame. The film winding is then completed so that the camera is ready to shoot another pair of images.

Later-model cameras featured a double exposure button, which could be pulled out to make a double exposure but could otherwise be left alone, as well as a depth-of-field scale on the focusing knob. Many also had red marks on f/6.3, 1/50 and on 20 feet. This was called "The Three R's in Outdoor Stereo Photography" and is based on the then-standard ASA 10 color slide film. Earlier cameras lacked these features but they could be added. The double exposure button would have to be installed by the factory, but the depth-of-field scale and red marks could be added by a dealer or even the camera's owner. Thus, older model Realists are sometimes found with red marks or depth-of-field scales, but without double exposure buttons.

A characteristic of "Stereo Realist" type cameras is that the lenses are at a fixed separation, known as "fixed stereo base", which was slightly more than the average distance between the human eyes. The stereo base was ideal for subjects that were 7 to 20 feet from the camera, which worked well for most pictures but was somewhat lacking for more distant scenic shots. Accessories were available to effectively lengthen the stereo base for scenic shots and reduce it for macro shots, but these were seldom used.

== Accessories and mounting services ==
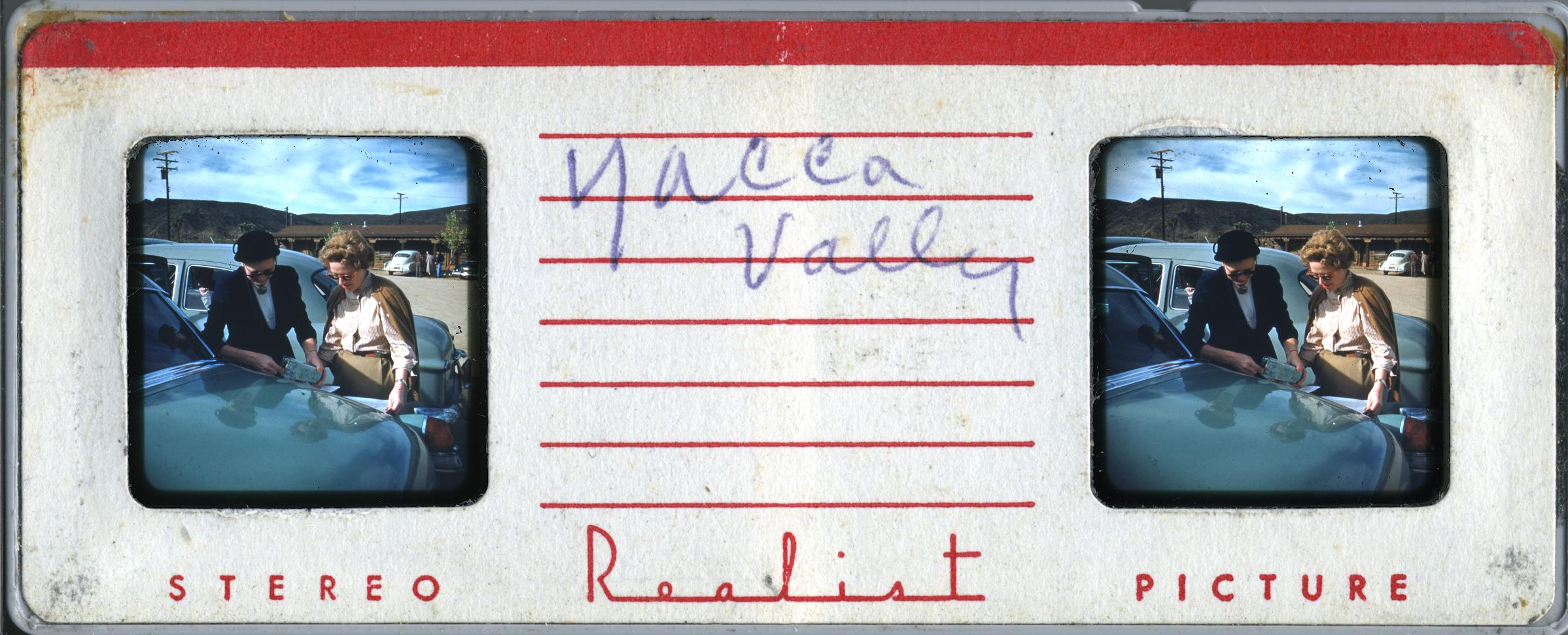
Back (label) side of a Permamount

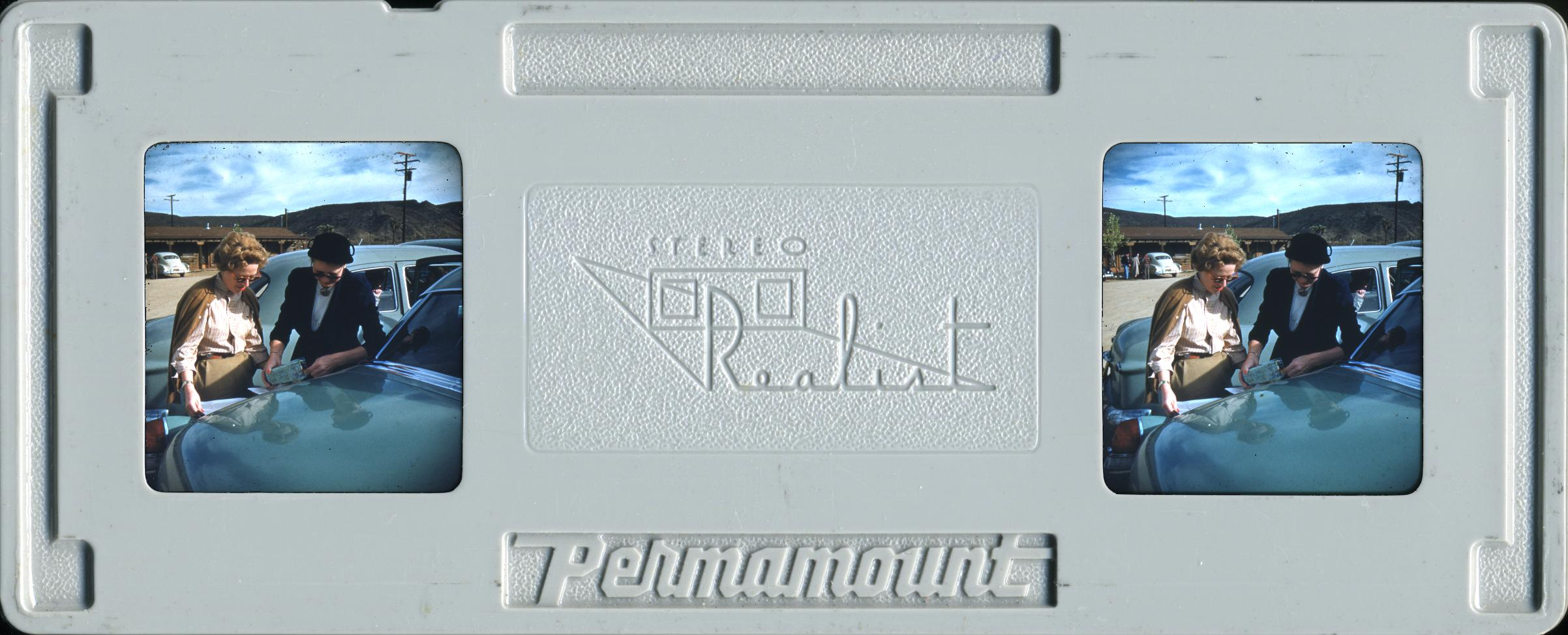
Front (viewing) side of Realist Permamount.

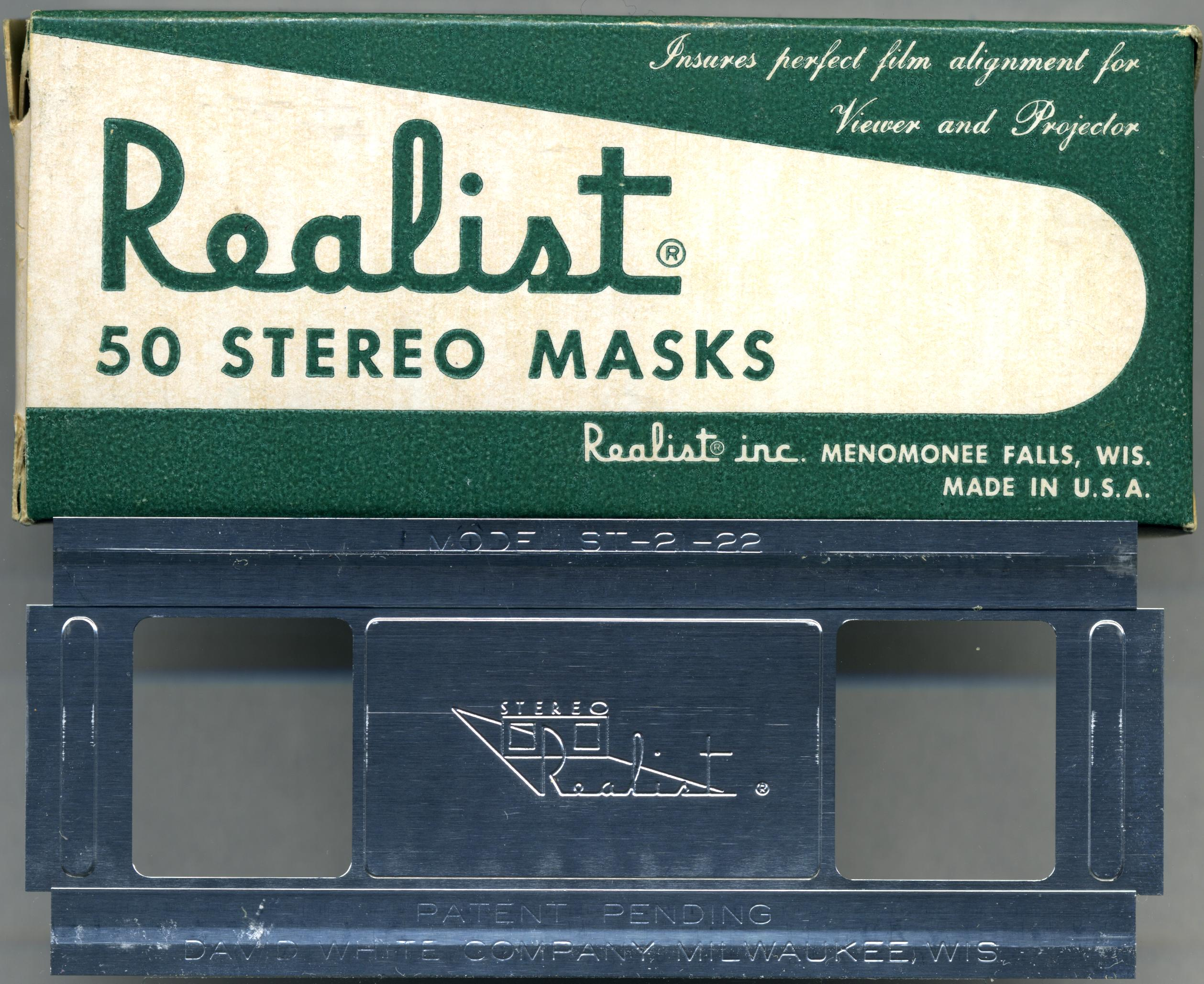
Realist aluminum mask and box

Because the Realist effectively created a new format of slide, its users needed a new line of accessories and services. The David White company obliged by producing a whole system which included everything needed to take, mount, view, and store stereo slides.

Among the available accessories was a complete mounting kit which included a sorting tray, film cutter, tweezers, three different types of aluminum masks, cardboard folders, a mounting jig, and mounting glass. Mounting glass could be secured with mounting tape, binder frames, or with plastic "Permamounts".

Permamounts were considered premium mounts, with a label on one side and a neat viewing window on the other. They were considered suitable for projection because the rigid plastic construction was stiff enough for automatic magazines but no plastic covered the image area so there was no interference with polarization. The operator of the projector did need to be careful not to leave the same slide in the projector for too long, because the heat would eventually start to warp the mount.

Viewing accessories included several types of slide viewers, the Realist stereo projector, and polarized glasses.

There were various types of slide storage cases available, some of which could accommodate the viewer as well.

Most of these accessories were also made by other companies, which sometimes improved upon the Realist offerings. The stereo projectors made by TDC (Three Dimension Company), for example, were far more popular than the Realist stereo projector. Some users preferred cardboard slip-in mounts made by third parties because of their ease of use, even though they were generally considered to be of lower quality and were not suitable for projection. The Brumberger binder frames and mounting glass were very popular among users of stereo projectors.

All of these can be found on eBay in used or occasionally NOS condition and some of them (or their modern equivalents) are still manufactured.

The Realist stereo mounting service used several different types of mounts during its run. The earliest mounts used a type of aluminized cardboard mask inside a cardboard foldover. This tended to warp with exposure to humidity, changing the alignment of the film chips. In older slide collections, the film chips may have slipped to the point that the slide is unviewable without readjustment, and one film chip may have even fallen out.

Later slides from this service were usually in "precision mounts" which contained an aluminum mask inside the same style of cardboard foldover. The precision mounts may or may not have the words "precision mount" printed on the outside.

Kodak also had a stereo slide mounting service. Whereas the mounts used in the Realist service appear to have been designed for hand-mounting, the Kodak mounts look like they were made exclusively for high-volume machine mounting. The Kodak mounts are all-cardboard and have the appearance of being a single piece of cardboard. Purists did not recommend them for projection because the stereo window was not very precise and the mount was not stiff enough for the automatic feeding mechanism of some deluxe stereo projectors.

== Other models ==
Aside from the standard f/3.5 Realist (a.k.a. ST-41, model 1041) there were several other models.

=== Realist 2.8 (a.k.a. ST-42, model 1042) ===
This model featured four-element f/2.8 lenses rather than the three-element f/3.5 lenses used by the standard Realist. Most users under normal use will not notice the difference, though the f/3.5 lenses have slightly better contrast. The f/3.5 lenses all show vignetting at smaller apertures whereas the f/2.8 lenses do not. The f/2.8 lenses also work better with supplementary lenses.

More recently, the f/2.8 Realists have been favored for 7P widening, because their lenses adequately cover the wider frame whereas the f/3.5 lenses cannot.

=== Realist Custom (model 1050) ===
The Realist Custom features higher-quality f/2.8 "rare earth" lenses. It also has a higher-quality brushed satin chrome finish and larger knobs. The Custom used thicker coarse-grain kangaroo leather rather than the standard goat leather used on other models. The rangefinder has detents that make audible clicks as the camera is focused. The exposure counter counts down rather than up, with red marks at stereo exposure numbers 16 (for 20 exposure rolls) and 29 (for 36 exposure rolls). The Custom model has an engraved name plate reading "Realist Custom".

The Custom had other refinements. Only the finest parts were used for Customs and the "rare earth" lenses were more precisely matched than on other cameras.

=== Realist 45 (model 1045) ===
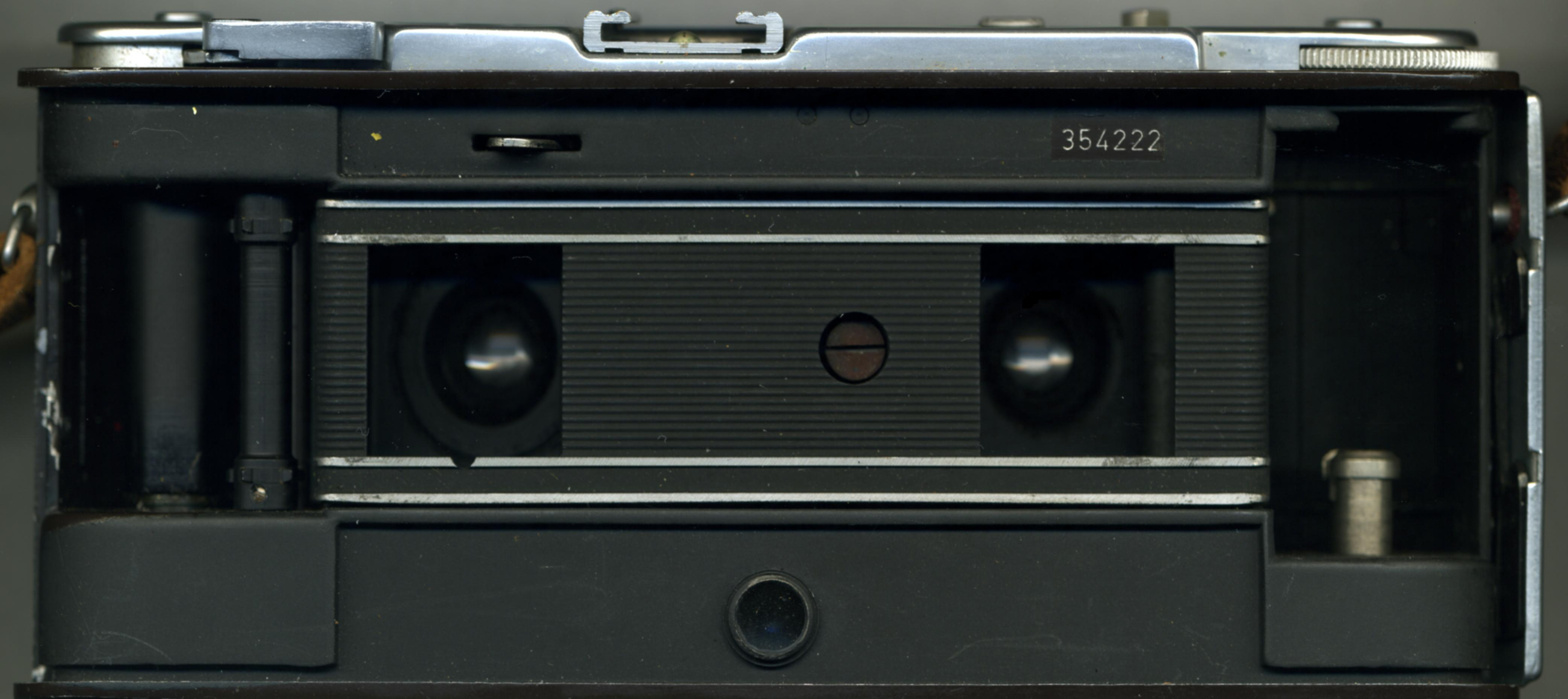
Realist 45 with back removed, showing film chamber.

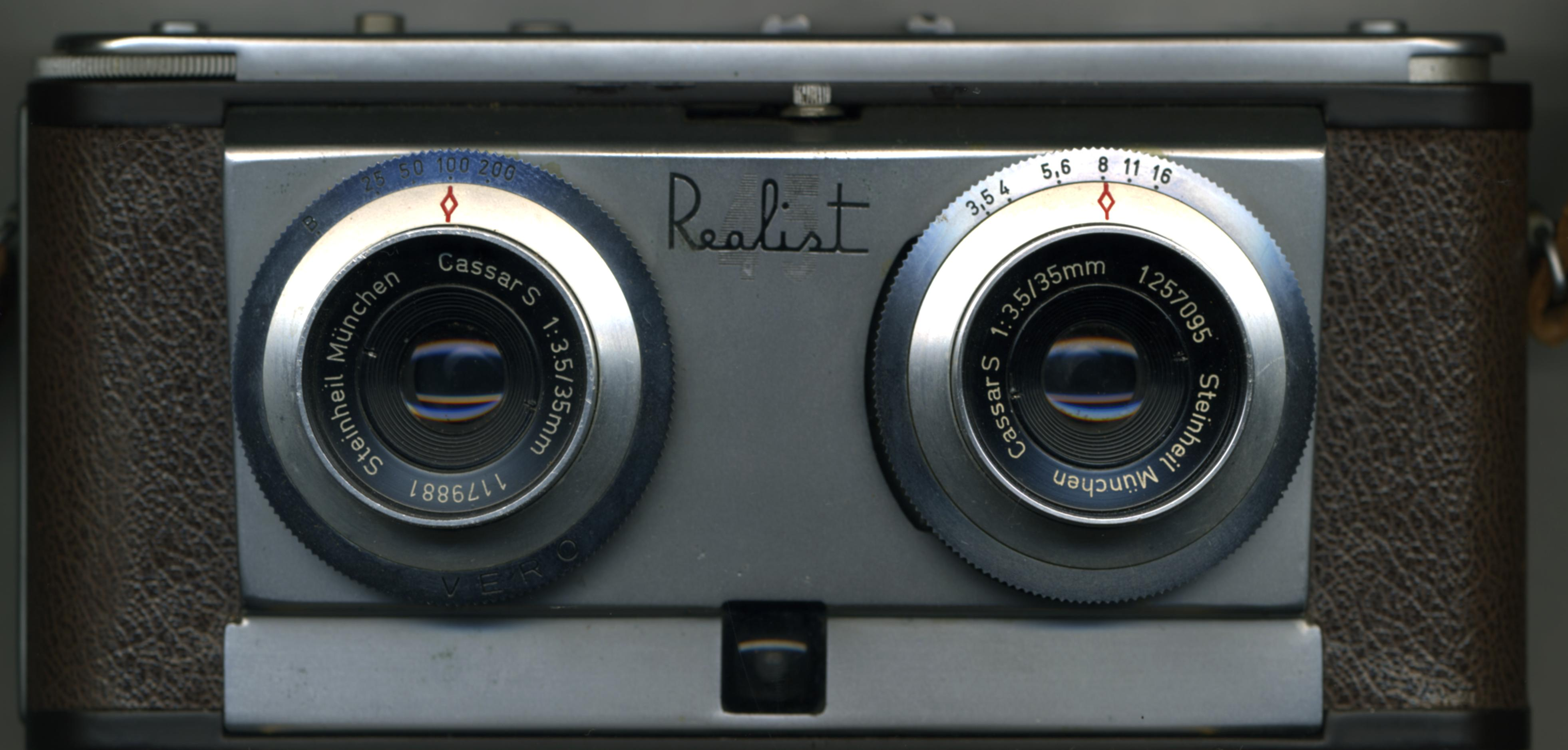
Realist 45 camera

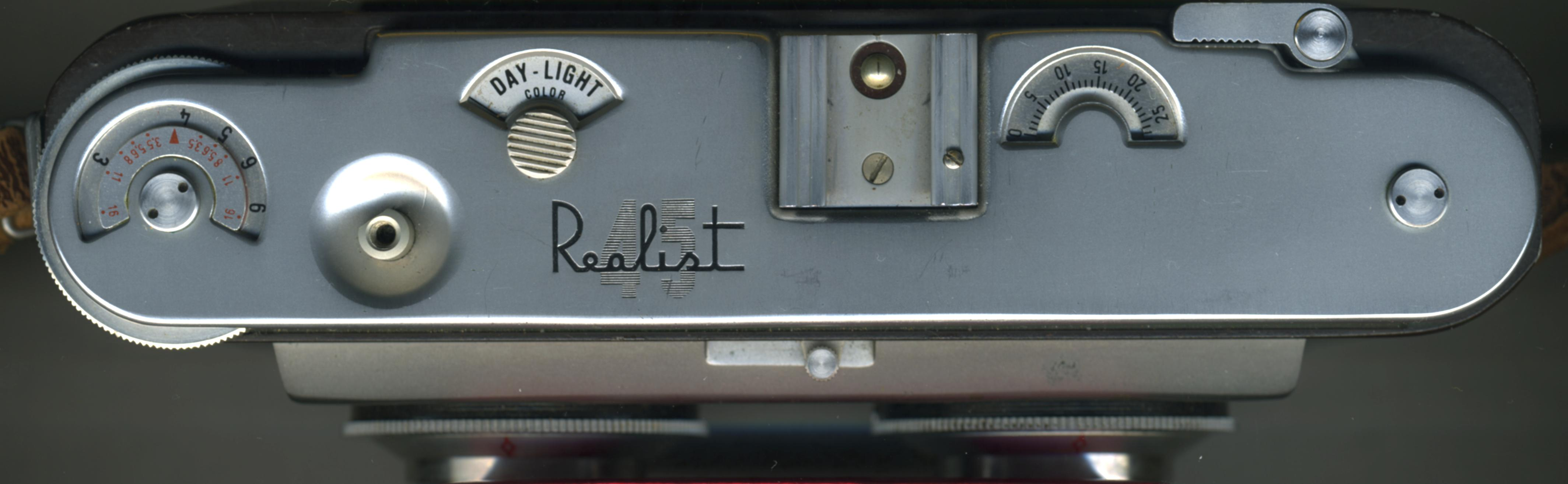
Realist 45 from the top, note top mounted focus control.

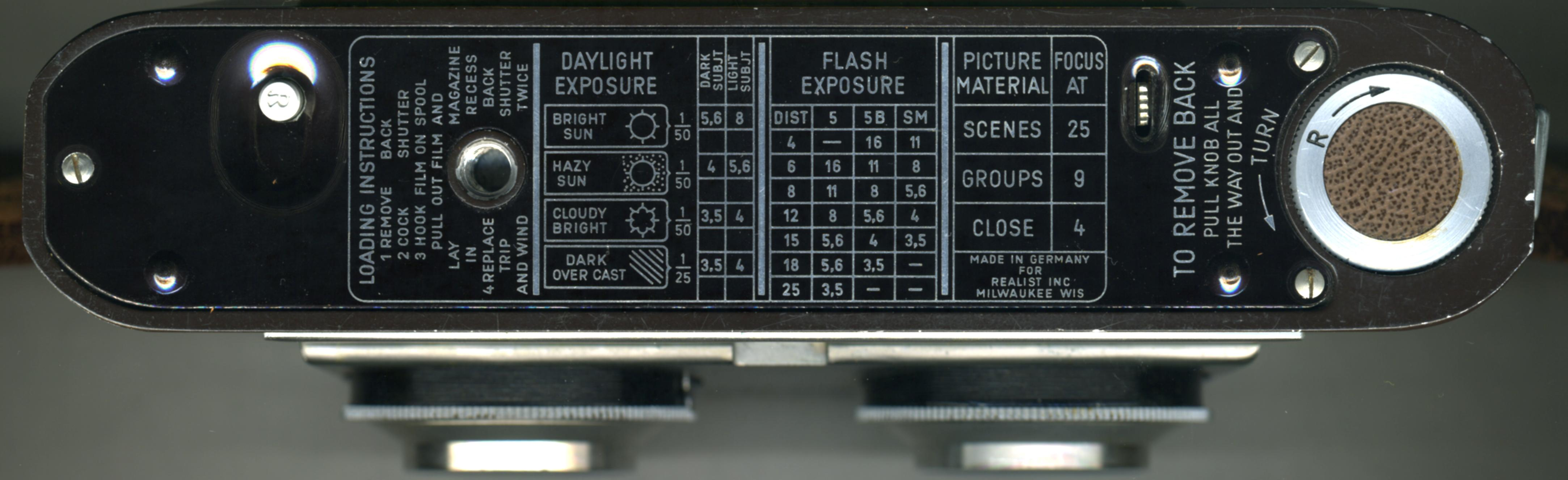
Realist 45 from the bottom

The Realist 45 is a stripped-down version of the German-made Iloca Stereo Rapid, without the rangefinder and self-timer. It was marketed by Realist Inc. in the U.S., apparently as an economical, easy-to-use camera to compete with the Kodak Stereo Camera.

Though the design is clearly different, the Realist 45 has several features in common with the Kodak Stereo Camera. It features an automatically cocked shutter. There is built-in double exposure prevention with manual override. There is also a film type indicator on top.

The Realist 45 also differs from the Kodak Stereo Camera in several ways: the Realist 45 film transport features a swing-out lever that allows rapid winding, a handy feature for those wishing to take a lot of shots quickly. Unlike the Kodak, the Realist 45 has a top-mounted focusing knob that moves the film plane in a fashion similar to the standard Realist. There is a depth-of-field scale built into the knob going up to f/16. The top-mounted exposure counter counts up rather than down, like the Kodak counter.

Aperture settings are on a ring mounted on the left lens, ranging from f/3.5 to f/16 with all whole f-stops marked. The shutter speed is set by a ring mounted on the right lens and includes B, 1/25, 1/50, 1/100 and 1/200.

The bottom of the camera contains the rewind knob release lever, the rewind release button and the rewind knob, which also opens the back. Printing on the bottom includes loading instructions, daylight exposure table, flash exposure table, (both based on ASA 10 film) and suggestions for common focus settings.

The Realist 45 also features the then-standard hot shoe (referred to as an accessory clip). This was more versatile when it was released because it allowed using most contemporary flash accessories, and in recent years it has been much easier to find an adapter for modern electronic flash units than it was for the Kodak.

Unlike the Standard Realist, the Realist 45 is not constantly available on eBay, but does come up on a fairly regular basis and usually sells for $100–$200 in good clean condition.

=== Olden Realist ===
In 1970, The Olden Camera and Lens Company in New York City acquired about 500 f/2.8 (model 1042) Realists which were sold under the Olden name for about six years. These were similar in appearance to regular model 1042 cameras, but had a sticker on the name plate with the Olden company name.

Because they were made out of left-over parts, including parts intended for Custom Realists, they had a variable combination of features from both Model 1042 and Model 1050 cameras. Because of this, some have been sold by third parties on the used camera market as Realist Customs (model 1050) though they had only some of the features that distinguish Customs from regular model 1042 Realists.

The Olden Realist cameras sold from 1970 to around 1976 were some of the last new Stereo Realists sold.

=== Macro Realist (model 1060) ===
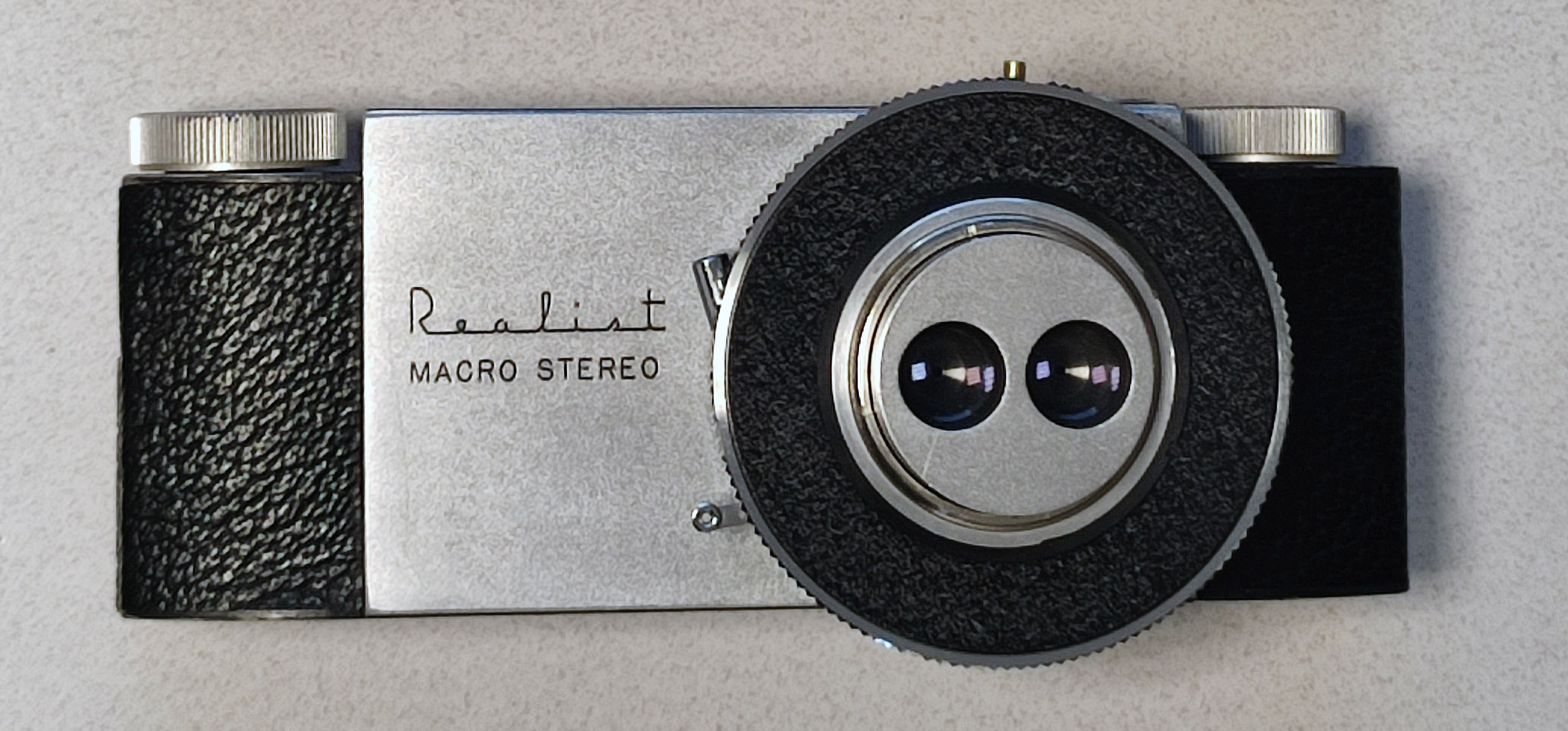
Realist Macro Stereo camera front view

The Macro Realist a.k.a. model 1060 had the same body as the regular Stereo Realist but was a completely different camera. The Macro Realist was designed to stereograph subjects that are 4 to 5 ½ inches away. It was invented by Clarence G. Henning.

Unlike the regular Realist, it had fixed focus and fixed aperture. Technical requirements of macro work related to the interocular distance of 15 mm dictated that the subject be a certain distance from the camera, so a pair of "arms" located in front of the lens showed where the subject needed to be. The camera was held by a hand grip with a built-in shutter button and lighting was through an electronic flash unit sold with the camera. The one missing feature that would have made it a truly convenient point-and-shoot was a motorized film advance, a rare feature indeed for cameras of that era.

There was a single shutter for both lenses, thus insuring perfect synchronization, an important consideration when stereographing live insects. Shutter speeds available ranged from "B" and "T" up to 1/125, though the shutter speed made little difference when using the electronic flash.

Realist Inc. also produced an accessory lens kit, model 1525, that allowed varying the distance further from the subject (-3) or much closer (+3, +6 and +10). Each lens came with a custom set of arms showing the range of focus. The interocular remained fixed at 15 mm, so the magnification given by the +10 lens resulted in excessive parallax, and many people found the pictures produced by it difficult to view. Likewise, the depth in pictures taken with the -3 lens was somewhat subtle.

The Macro Realist was manufactured for about one year, ending production in 1972. Existing stock sold slowly, however, and it was still available from Realist Inc. until 1976. It is estimated that only about 350 units were made. The Macro Realist rarely appears on eBay, and when it does the asking price is in the $6000 range.

== Post 1971 ==
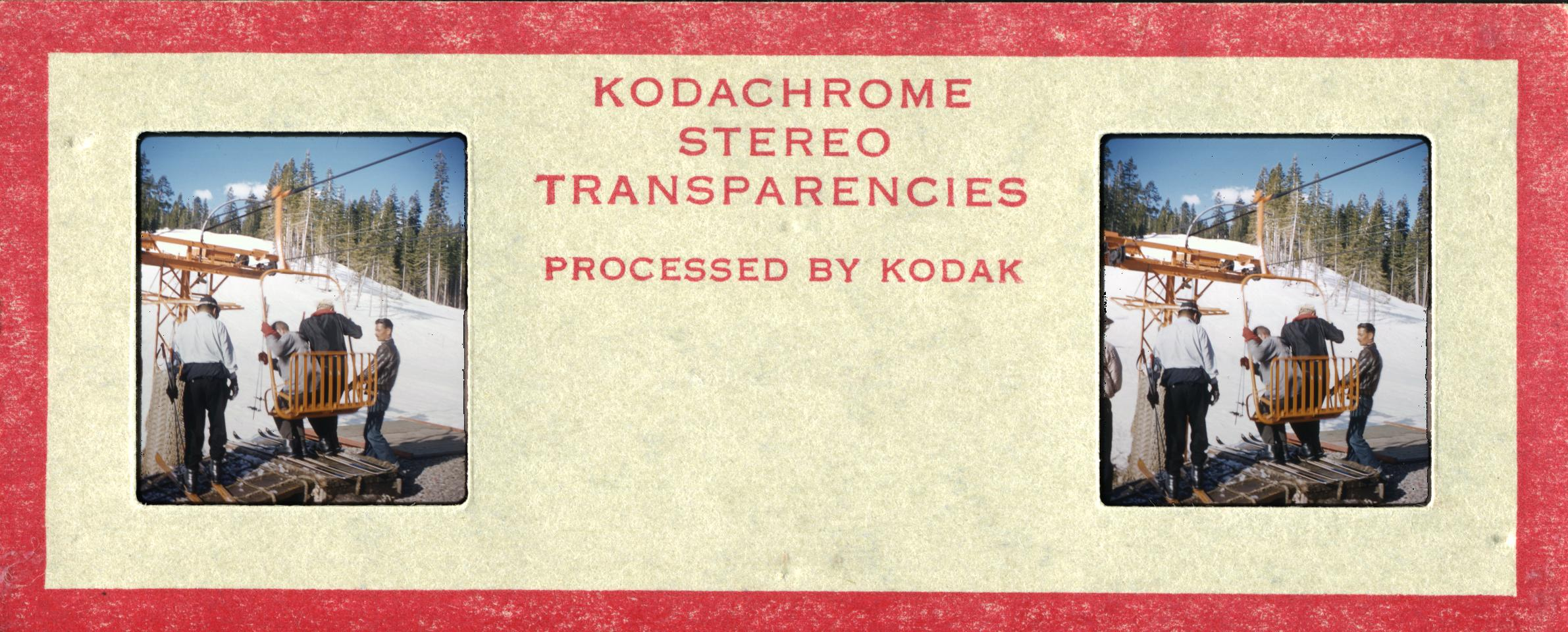
Standard mount used by Kodak through 1957. Note older color scheme. There was no embossed processing date.

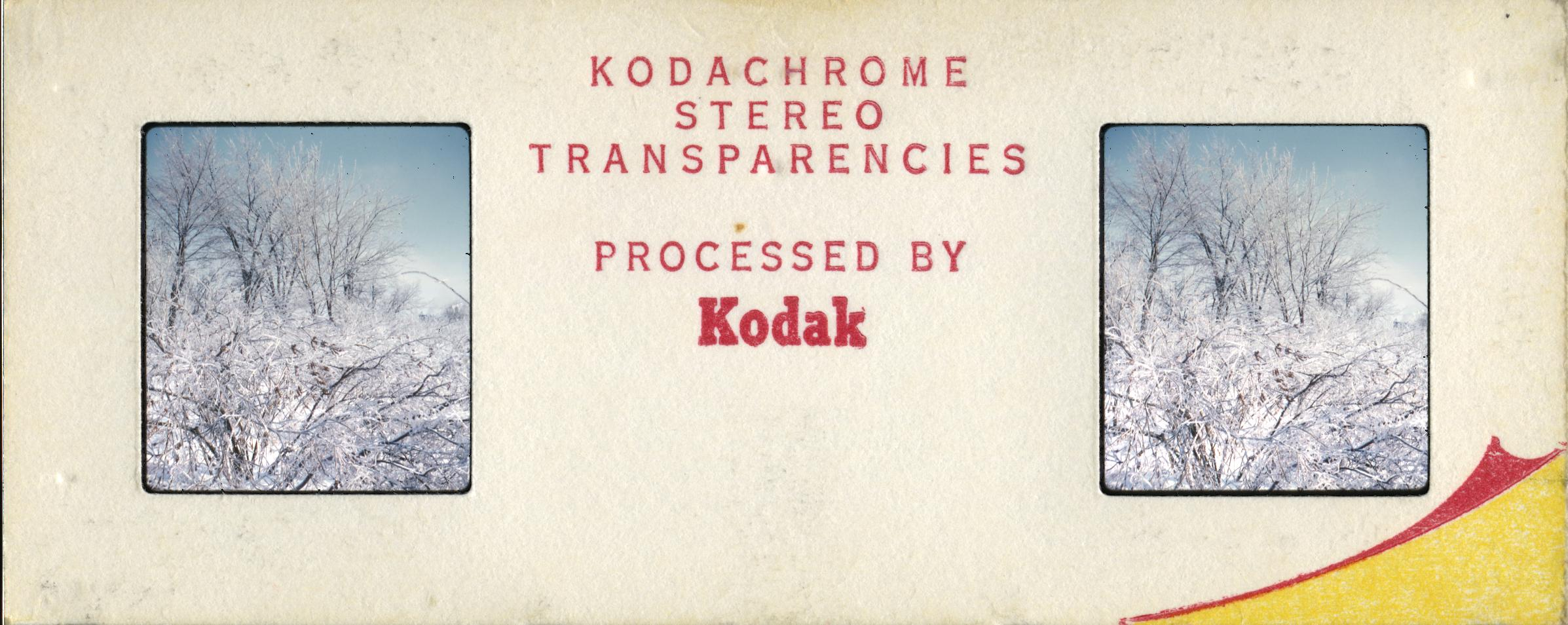
Standard mount used by Kodak after 1958, note the modern color scheme. Processing date was embossed on the other side.

Date embossed on later Kodak stereo mount.

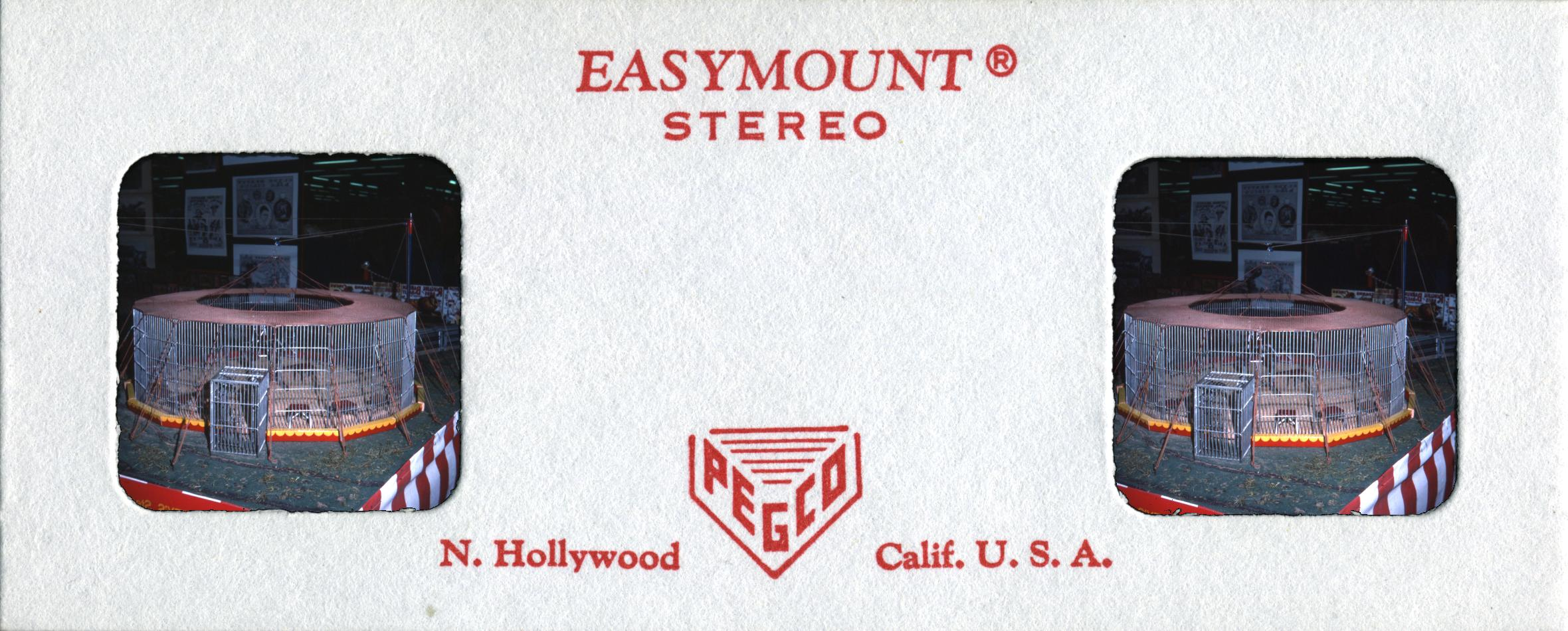
3rd party cardboard slip in mount, nonadjustable window.

As mentioned earlier, both Macro Realists and Olden Realists were still available as new cameras as late as 1976. Other Realists may have been sold by dealers as New Old Stock after 1971 as well.

The end of Realist production did not spell the end of their use, or market support. Indeed, many avid Realist users were not even born when Realist ceased production in 1971.

=== Mounting services ===
In the book Amazing 3D it is suggested that Kodak abandoned its mounting service in 1955 and then resumed it after the demise of the Realist. In many stereo slide collections there are Kodak-mounted slides with handwritten dates from 1956 to 1957, as well as Kodak mounts with embossed dates from 1958 to 1971 and later. This suggests that it was actually the Realist slide mounting service that ended in 1955, as no Realist-mounted slides after that date seem to exist.

Kodak maintained its stereo slide mounting service into the late 1980s. There are still some companies which can process and mount stereo slides, mostly through mail order.

After the David White Company got out of the stereo photography business, a company called Sigma continued to make Realist-style aluminum masks without Realist branding until the supply of semi-rigid aluminum dried up. These were sold by companies such as Reel 3D Enterprises well into the 1980s.

Other slide mounting options are still available. For example, the cardboard Spicer Mounts. Supplies are generally available from stereo photography clubs, eBay or mail order companies.

Realist photographers today usually mount the slides themselves. They have the film commercially developed and returned as an uncut strip.

=== Slide film ===
The Stereo Realist was designed to use slide film. Although it is possible to use print film in it, it has never been easy to find labs that could properly print 5P format prints. Users who do not do their own film processing but which have their own 35mm film scanner and a computer with photo editing software such as Photoshop or GIMP can have their negatives returned uncut (lab dependent) and can prepare the images for printing on standard size photo paper themselves.

Slide film is no longer as commonly available as it once was. Slide film remained popular for general non-stereo uses through the 1980s, and as late as 2005 at least one type of slide film was available at most places that sold print film. By the end of 2006 the picture had changed and slide film became difficult to find. For general consumers, slides were replaced with technologies such as video camcorders and photo CDs (bundled with a set of prints). Film itself, both slide and print, was made scarce by digital photography. Slide film remains available as a professional and enthusiast product, and is available from camera stores and through mail order.

Most vintage stereo slides were taken on Kodachrome slide film. Kodachrome was popular with stereo photographers because it had better color reproduction compared to other transparency films available at the time (such as Anscochrome) and low grain (especially in the Kodachrome 10 ASA film, which was standard in the early 1950s, and later 25 ASA film). Collectors of vintage slides appreciate the fact that it has also held up much better than other color films. Stereo slides viewed in hand-held slide viewers reveal a lot of detail, making grain more noticeable. However, by 2009 Kodak ceased production of Kodachrome, and the last laboratory stopped developing it at the end of 2010.

Other slide films are still available and can be used. Primarily Ektachrome, Velvia, and Provia still being available in the 2020s.

=== Digital stereo photography ===
Digital photography is changing the stereo photography market. Many stereo photographers are now using two digital cameras and projecting stereo using data projectors and polarizing lenses.

With the recent popularity of 3D movies, 3D televisions and 3D computer gaming, there has been a renewed interest in stereo photography. Consumer stereo digital cameras are starting to appear on the market (such as the Fujifilm FinePix Real 3D W1 and its successor, the W3), but have yet to become as well known as the Stereo Realist in its day, though the Fuji W3 has already outsold the Stereo Realist, and is expected to outsell all the 1950s stereo cameras combined by September 2011.

=== Use and availability ===
There are still dedicated Stereo Realist camera users, and active stereo photography clubs around the world.

=== Trademark ===
RadioShack's hi-fi brand "Realistic" was originally "Realist" at its 1954 launch, but was renamed due to the camera maker's prior claim on the trademark.

The "Stereo Realist" trademark is currently registered to John J. Zelenka and is currently in use as a 3D production and services company located in New York.

== Published works with the Stereo Realist ==
Leo Villa, mechanic for Sir Malcolm and Donald Campbell's record-breaking Bluebirds, was given a Stereo Realist by Campbell in 1955. Many of his photographs with it have recently been published in book form as polychromatic anaglyphs (i.e., single composite photographs viewed through colored viewing glasses).

Harold Lloyd took thousands of stereo slides with his Realist and wrote the introduction to the Stereo Realist Manual published by Morgan and Lester. He also took several of the stereo pictures used in that book. Many of his pictures of Hollywood celebrities were published in the book 3D Hollywood and in Hollywood Nudes in 3-D!.
