= 3D camcorder =

Camcorder capable of recording 3D video

A 3D camcorder can record 3D video.

The first consumer 3D camcorder was the Toshiba SK-3D7K, exhibited at CES 1988 in Las Vegas, and available for purchase in 1989; 500 were produced. It had a dual CCD/lens setup that recorded the stereoscopic video in field-sequenced NTSC format through a built-in multiplexer onto VHS-C tapes. No other consumer 3D camcorder was produced until the Fujifilm W1, about 20 years later.

The 3D camcorder was invented by Chris Condon, founder of SteroVision and inventor of many 3D camera lenses.

== 3D HD pocket camcorder ==
A 3D pocket camcorder is similar in size to a compact camera. Many 3D camcorders can record stereo sound and are provided with image stabilization.

The first 3D pocket camcorder is the Fujifilm FinePix Real 3D W1. It has two lenses but only one processor so can be slow when processing 3D.

The Aiptek3D i2 has two lenses and two sensors. The 3D images may be seen in the parallax-barrier LCD panel without glasses. When the device is plugged into an external TV or monitor, the monitor must be able to turn a side-by-side video stream into a stereoscopic display.

In late 2011, Panasonic announced the Panasonic Lumix DMC-3D1, its first 3D compact digital video camera. It is similar to the Fujifilm FinePix Real 3D W3, the successor to the 3D W1, but without the W3's lenticular screen that allows photos and videos to be viewed in 3D on the camera itself without the need for glasses. Videos are recorded as a single 1080p video stream, to be divided in half (left and the right), so the effective resolution is 960×1080 pixels, near HD resolution at 1280×720 pixels and certainly not Full HD resolution at 1920×1080 pixels.

With the shape (but not size) of a standard camcorder (unlike other 3D HD pocket camcorders), the Vivitar Vivicam DVR 790HD 3D can be bought at around $70. The distance between the two lenses in Vivitar is shorter than its rivals (due to the camera shape). It shoots in HD 1280×720/25p and captures 5MP digital still images with fix-focus at up to a 4× digital zoom. It has HDMI output for HDTVs and is provided with 3D glasses. The 3D camcorder also includes YouTube Express, which will convert and upload the videos and photos to YouTube.

Other 3D pocket digital camcorder are:
Panasonic 3D Lumix H-FT012 lens (for the GH2, GF2, GF3, GF5 cams and also for the hybrid W8 cam).
Praktica and Medion 3D (two clones of the DXG-5D8 cam).
Sony Blogie 3D.
Aiptek IS2 and Viewsonic 3D cams.
3D FUN cam of 3dInlife.
SVP dc-3D-80 cam (parallel & anaglyph, stills & video).
Toshiba Camileo z100 camcorder.
DXG-5G2V
Aiptek IH3 camcorder

The LG Optimus 3D P920 is an Android smartphone, but it can be categorized as a 3D HD pocket camcorder (along with 3 other smartphones: the Optimus 3d Max -without HDMI port-, the Sharp Aquos SH80F - only for Japan and Europe - and the HTC Evo 3D - with the biggest stereobase -). All five smartphones have two stereoscopic lenses, so have true 3D. The LG Optimus 3D P920 has two 5 megapixel sensors (8 MP in the Sharp Aquos SH80F) and can take 3D video in 720p and 2D video in 1080p.

== 3D Full HD pocket camcorder ==
At the 2011 Consumer Electronics Show in Las Vegas, Sony introduced the Bloggie 3D MHS-FS3 camcorder with dual lenses and dual sensors that can record video in 3D HD at 1080p with stereo audio. It can also take 3D stills. It is compatible with 3D TVs, and can display on non-3D TVs as 3D with classic red-blue images visible with the traditional 3D glasses.

The Samsung NX300, a mirrorless interchangeable-lens camera, has an optional prime lens 45mm f/1.8 (2D/3D.) The lens can capture 2D or 3D stills and Full HD, 2D or 3D movies without changing the lens.

== 3D standard HD camcorder ==
A 3D standard camcorder is similar in size to a conventional camcorder with an enlarged lens. The larger lenses provide better images than a 3D pocket camcorder.

The first Consumer 3D camcorder was the Toshiba SK-3D7K, exhibited at CES 1988 in Las Vegas and available for purchase in 1989. It had a dual CCD/lens setup that recorded the stereoscopic video in field-sequenced NTSC format through a built-in multiplexer onto VHS-C tapes. It remained the only consumer 3D camcorder for about 20 years until the release of the Fujifilm W1. Only 500 of these camcorders were produced.

Panasonic's HDC-SDT750 was the first consumer oriented standard-sized 3D HD camcorder. It has an HD camcorder body with a dual-lens 3D attachment. In contrast to later 3D camcorders, the HDC-SDT750 is incapable of optical zoom operation in 3D mode. At Consumer Electronic Show 2011, Panasonic launched five 3D-ready camcorders: HDC-TM900, HS900, SD900, HDC-SD800 and HDC-SD90. The previous four models use 3 sensors, which each sensor handling a different colour. And the latest model use only one sensor, but offering a 28 mm wide angle lens, 21x optical zoom (stretched to 40x with combination of digital zoom), Hybrid Optical Image Stabilization and 1080/50p. All the five camcorders offer compatibility with their existing 3D adapter, the VW-CLT1 3D Conversion Lens, which uses also on HDC-SDT750.

== 3D standard Full HD camcorder ==
Sony claims its HDR-TD10E is the world's first 'Double Full HD' 3D camcorder (not for stills). It has dual lenses, dual sensors and dual processors. It has 10x optical zoom, and the 3D image is viewable on its LCD panel without glasses.
The Sony HDR-TD20 and the later HDR-TD30 are only for video and not for stills.

JVC's first 3D camcorder is the JVC GS-TD1 which has two lenses and two sensors. It can record 3D Full HD video in 1080p at a maximum data rate of 34 Mbit/s with stereo audio (also for stills) and has 5x optical zoom in 3D or 10x optical zoom in 2D. The 3D image is viewable on its 3.5" LCD touchscreen panel without glasses.

List:

- DXG DXG-5F9VK HD 1080p 3D Camcorder
- Sony HDR-TD10 3D Handycam (2011)
- Sony HDR-TD20 3D Handycam (2012)
- Sony HDR-TD30 3D Handycam (2013)
- Sony HXR-NX3D1 3D Handycam
- JVC Everio GS-TD1 BUS 3D
- JVC Pro Cam ProHD GY-HMZ1U 3D
- Panasonic HDC-SDT750 3D Ready
- Panasonic HDC-Z10000
- Panasonic AG-3DA1
- Canon XF100

== Digital stereo bases (baselines) ==
There are different cameras with different stereo bases (distances between the two camera lenses) in the nonprofessional market of 3D digital cameras used for stills and video:

- ? mm Inlife-Handnet HDC-810
- 10 mm Panasonic 3D Lumix H-FT012 lens (for the GH2, GF2, GF3, GF5, GF6 cams and also for the hybrid W8 cam).
- 12 mm DXG-5D8 cam and the clones Medion 3D and Praktica DMMC-3D.
- 15 mm Ararat Macro Beam Splitter for smartphones.
- 20 mm Sony Blogie 3D.
- 23 mm Loreo 3D Macro lens.
- 25 mm LG Optimus 3D, LG Optimus 3D MAX (smartphones) and the Cyclopital3D close-up macro adapter (for the W1 and W3 Fujifilm cams).
- 28 mm Sharp Aquos SH80F and SHI12 (smartphones) and the Toshiba Camileo z100 camcorder.
- 30 mm Panasonic 3D1 camera, Camex 3D cam and LG IC330 (LG Cinema 3D camcorder).
- 31 mm Sony HDR-TD10 camcorder.
- 32 mm HTC Evo 3D smartphone.
- 35 mm JVC TD1, DXG-5G2V, VTech Kidizoom 3D, GoPro HD Hero kit 3D, Nintendo 3D, Vivitar 790 HD (only for anaglyph stills and video), and AEE 3D Magicam.
- 40 mm Ararat Beam Splitter for smartphones and 3D Aiptec camcorders (Aiptek I2 -also the Viewsonic clone-, Aiptek I2P, Aiptek IS2 and Aiptek IH3 3D cams).
- 50 mm Loreo for full frame or non digital cams, and the 3D FUN cam of 3dInlife (also the clones Phenix PHC1, Phenix SDC821 and Rollei Powerflex 3D).
- 55 mm SVP dc-3D-80 cam (parallel & anaglyph, stills & video).
- 60 mm Vivitar 3D cam (only for anaglyph pictures).
- 65 mm Takara Tomy 3D ShotCam.
- 75 mm Fujifilm W3 cam.
- 77 mm Fujifilm W1 cam.
- 84 mm Sony Digital Recording Binoculars DEV-50
- 88 mm Loreo 3D lens for digital cams.
- 140 mm Cyclopital3D base extender for the JVC TD1 and Sony TD10.
- 200 mm Cyclopital3D base extender for the Panasonic AG-3DA1.
- 214 mm Cyclopital3D base extender for the Sony Digital Recording Binoculars DEV-50.
- 225 mm Cyclopital3D base extender for the Fujifilm W1 and W3 cams
