= Nick Saglimbeni =

American visual artist, director, and photographer

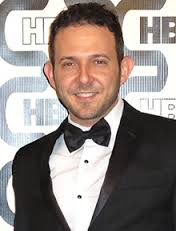
- Saglimbeni at the 2013 Golden Globe Awards
- Born: Baltimore, Maryland, United States
- Awards: World Photography Awards (2012 Grand Prize in 3D)
- Website: nicksaglimbeni.com

Nick Saglimbeni is an American photographer and filmmaker, best known for his work with celebrities and 3D photography. Through his production company Slickforce Studio, he has produced creative projects for entertainment figures worldwide such as the Kardashian-Jenner family, Priyanka Chopra, Sean "Diddy" Combs, Paula Abdul and B1A4. He has photographed commercial campaigns for large companies including Neiman Marcus and Skechers, as well as for non-profit organizations such as Autism Speaks and The Humane Society.

In 2011, Saglimbeni began publishing the 3D magazine WMB 3D: World's Most Beautiful, which earned him the Grand Prize in 3D at the 2012 Sony World Photography Awards. He debuted the photography project SlickforceGirl in 2012, which features models in heroic contexts with comic-book-inspired visuals. The shoots and videos have featured models such as Erika Medina and Melanie Iglesias. In 2018, Saglimbeni launched Painted Princess Project, a portrait campaign which raises money to help victims of human trafficking.

== Early life and education ==
Nick Saglimbeni was born and raised in Baltimore, Maryland. He moved to Los Angeles to attend the USC School of Cinematic Arts, where his cinematography mentors included John Hora and Woody Omens. Saglimbeni graduated with a master's degree in cinematography.

== Career ==
=== Slickforce Studio and early shoots ===
After graduating from college, Saglimbeni began working as both a cinematographer and a photographer. In January 2004 he opened Slickforce Studio, a multimedia company focused on motion picture production and commercial photography. As of 2014 the company's photographers produced material for magazines, ad campaigns, record labels, and websites. Early work included photography and album artwork for rap artists such as Nas, Ice-T, T.I., Omarion, Game, and Birdman. He later worked with women in entertainment such as model Estella Warren, actresses Roselyn Sánchez, Gabrielle Union, and Sarah Shahi, and TV personalities Vanessa Lachey, and Layla Kayleigh. He is also known for his portraits of the Kardashian-Jenner family and Sean "Diddy" Combs, and he has photographed commercial campaigns for large companies such as Neiman Marcus, Nordstrom, Sears, Kmart, Skechers, and Wacom. Through Slickforce, Saglimbeni has also created works to benefit nonprofit organizations, such as Autism Speaks, Breast Cancer Charities of America (BCCA), the Epilepsy Foundation, Hope for the Warriors, Toys for Tots, and People for the Ethical Treatment of Animals.

=== Work with the Kardashian-Jenner family ===
In August 2007, Saglimbeni met socialite Kim Kardashian while photographing her cover shoot for a magazine. Following the shoot, he continued to photograph Kim and her family members Kourtney Kardashian, Khloé Kardashian, Rob Kardashian, Kendall Jenner, Kylie Jenner, Kris Jenner and Caitlyn Jenner (then Bruce) (Note: Jenner changed her name due to gender transition in 2015.) for projects such as the Kardashian Kollection fashion campaigns, magazine covers for Kim, Kris and Khloé, Kris Jenner's 2011 autobiography book cover, promotional art for Kris Jenner's talk show, Kim Kardashian's wedding to Kris Humphries, Kylie Jenner Cosmetics, and Kendall and Kylie's first professional modeling shoots.

Saglimbeni's Kardashian-Jenner family Christmas portraits, which he photographed from 2010 through 2012, were featured in media outlets such as The View, The Talk, Larry King Live, and The Ellen DeGeneres Show, among others. Kim Kardashian has stated to E! News that Saglimbeni is her favorite photographer, and Saglimbeni has been featured around a dozen times on the reality show Keeping Up with the Kardashians and its related spin-offs, where he chiefly makes appearances as the family photographer. In season six, Saglimbeni encourages Kendall Jenner to pursue professional modeling during a shoot at Slickforce Studio. In 2022, Saglimbeni joined the Hulu series “The Kardashians” as consulting producer.

=== WMB 3D and 3D photography ===
In 2010, Saglimbeni patented his own Saglimbeni3D photography system. Saglimbeni had designed the system's post-production techniques along with Joyce Park, the post-production supervisor at Slickforce Studio. Unlike most similar systems, the Saglimbeni3D system purports to allow the retouching of 3D images. In August 2011, Saglimbeni published the first edition of the magazine WMB 3D: World's Most Beautiful, which he billed as the first commercial magazine photographed and designed entirely in 3D. Released both in print and as an iPad app, the first issue featured Kim Kardashian on the cover. Other celebrities who have been featured in the magazine include Stan Lee, Gabrielle Union, Estella Warren, Paul Oakenfold, Kevin Hart, Kendall Jenner, Kylie Jenner, Melanie Iglesias, Layla Kayleigh and Bollywood actress Mallika Sherawat. For his WMB 3D shoot Nuclear Summer, Saglimbeni was awarded the top prize in 3D at the 2012 Sony World Photography Awards in London, England. Later in 2012, he received an award from NVidia for achievements in 3D photography.

=== SlickforceGirl ===
In late 2012 Saglimbeni started the photography project SlickforceGirl, where he photographs models and actresses with comic-book-inspired visuals as they "use their beauty, brains and courage to help those in need." The first shoot featured Vanessa Veasley as an astronaut, while December 2012 featured Erika Medina as an airman with the Air Force. The series has since featured Nazanin Mandi, Melanie Iglesias, and a number of other models. A portion of the profits from SlickforceGirl items are donated to charities such as the Hope for the Warriors.

=== Work with Indian celebrities ===
Saglimbeni has worked with notable Bollywood celebrities. Since 2011, he worked with Maxim (India) magazine having photographed Mallika Sherawat, Priyanka Chopra, Disha Patani, Ranveer Singh, Neha Dhupia and Shibani Dandekar until the publication’s final issue in December 2018.

== Awards and nominations ==
Year	Award	Nominated work	Category	Result
2002	American Society of Cinematographers	Nick Saglimbeni	Heritage Award	Hon. Mention
2008	National Association of Photoshop Professionals		Compositing	Grand Prize
2008	National Association of Photoshop Professionals		Retouching	Grand Prize
2008	National Association of Photoshop Professionals	Nick Saglimbeni	Photography	Grand Prize
2009	Blackberry Business Awards	Nick Saglimbeni	Development of Signature; Retouching Techniques	Won
2012	NVidia 3D Vision Live		3D Photo Champion	Won
2012	Sony World Photography Awards		3D Category	Grand Prize

== TV appearances ==
As himself:

- Showdog Moms & Dads (reality TV mini-series, 2005)
- Kourtney & Khloé Take Miami (reality TV series)
  - "Back in Miami" (2010)
  - "Scotts-o-phrenia" (2010)
- LisaRaye: The Real McCoy (reality TV series)
  - "LisaRaye Gets Back to Business" (2010)
- Khloé & Lamar (reality TV series)
  - "Lamar Is a Dirty Boy" (2011)
  - "Rock-a-Bye Lam Lam" (2012)
- The Real Housewives of Orange County (reality TV series)
  - "Southern Hospitality" (2012)
- Keeping Up with the Kardashians (reality TV series)
  - "Kim's Fairytale Wedding: A Kardashian Event – Part 2" (2011)
  - "Kim Becomes a Stage Mom" (2011)
  - "Momager Dearest" (2012)
  - "Parent Trapped" (2012)
  - "Mothers & Daughters" (2012)
  - "Life's a Beach (House)" (2013)
  - "Kris’s Mother-in-Law" (2013)
  - "And All That Jazzzzzz" (2014)
  - "Fear of the Unknown" (2016)
- "Life of Kylie" (reality TV series)
  - "Boss" (2017)

== See also ==
- List of photographers
