= WMB 3D: World's Most Beautiful =

American fashion and lifestyle magazine

- Estella Warren on cover of 3rd issue (2D)
- Categories: Fashion, 3D photography
- Frequency: Annual
- Publisher: Howard Misle
- Founder: Nick Saglimbeni
- First issue: August 8, 2011
- Country: United States
- Based in: Los Angeles, California
- Language: English
- Website: worldsmostbeautiful.com

WMB 3D: World's Most Beautiful is an American fashion and lifestyle magazine based in Los Angeles. Created by Nick Saglimbeni in 2011, WMB 3D has been described as "the first commercial magazine entirely photographed and designed in 3D." The annual print issue has approximately 200 pages and is also available online; in both cases the features and ads can be seen in either 3D or 2D.

Issues have featured Kim Kardashian, Stan Lee, actress Gabrielle Union, DJ Paul Oakenfold, and Bollywood actress Mallika Sherawat. WMB 3D photoshoots and behind-the-scenes interviews have been covered on shows such as E! News.

== History ==
=== Founding, format ===
The Los Angeles-based magazine WMB 3D: World's Most Beautiful was founded by photographer Nick Saglimbeni and business executive Howard Misle in 2011. The magazine's stated mission "is to capture the most beautiful people, places, products, and fashion on the planet...in an unprecedented 3D viewing experience."

"When we decided to do the magazine, everyone tried to talk me out of doing print. Despite this, I was absolutely passionate about having a print publication. I wanted it to be something physical that people could buy and that I could ship around the world to places iPad and other digital technologies were not accessible."
— Founder Nick Saglimbeni

The magazine is routinely described as "the first commercial magazine entirely photographed and designed in 3D," and all elements, both features and advertisements, are photographed using Saglimbeni's proprietary 3D photographic technology the "Saglimbeni3D™." The two-part system consists of stereo capture, as well as post-production and retouching techniques. Each issue comes with a 2D version included. Standard red-cyan anaglyph glasses are required to view the images in 3D; glasses are inside, or the company supplies them for free via mail.

The magazine is also available for iPad, iPhone or Android. A free WMB 3D app was made available in the iTunes App Store and in Google Play, with the magazine content sold separately. Digital 3D and 2D images are hi resolution, allowing the reader to zoom in on details and text. The App versions also have interactivity such as embedded videos and bonus galleries. The WMB3D.com website was created in tandem with the print magazine, and also has material such as behind-the-scenes photos and backstage video interviews.

A portion of the profits from each issue are donated to charity.

=== Issue 1 (2011) ===
The first edition of the magazine was released on August 8, 2011. Initially the 200-page print version was discounted to $4.99, and the app to view the digital magazine was free on iPads, iPhones and Android phones.

It featured Kim Kardashian on the cover, and starting on August 1, 2011 her associated fashion photo-shoot in the California desert was featured on E! News. She also attended the magazine's launch party in Hollywood later that month. Other magazine featured covered American model and actress Melanie Iglesias, the Mercedes-Benz SLR McLaren, the country of Italy, and others.

Reception

In April 2012, founder Nick Saglimbeni received the "Grand Prize in 3D" at the Sony World Photography Organisation Awards in London, England for the WMB Issue 1 fashion feature, "Nuclear Summer", starring Swedish runway model Therese Fischer.

=== Issue 2 (2012) ===
Issue Two was released on January 5, 2012 with actress Gabrielle Union as the cover model. It also featured comic executive Stan Lee, 2009 Playmate of the Month Jessica Burciaga, the country of Kenya, comic Chris D'Elia of Whitney, and the Ferrari F430 Spider. Indian actress Mallika Sherawat was pictured in an 11-page photoshoot "in the role of a mechanic, saddled with a car that has packed up, and hoping to get a lift back to civilization." It was her first shoot with an American photographer, and according to the model, "I have never been photographed more beautifully."

Reception

According to UK print-related magazine PrintWeek in June 2012, "The magazine is considered a turning point in the use of 3D and has attracted a lot of attention as a result." A month later Saglimbeni was granted the annual Champion Award from NVIDIA for the WMB Issue 2 fashion feature "Warehouse Wonderland," which featured model Aryn Livingston.

=== Issue 3 (2013) ===
WMB 3D Volume 3 was released in print and online on June 1, 2013. Print copies also reached shelves at a number of Barnes & Noble book stores, with two pairs of sunglasses still included.

Canadian model Estella Warren was on the cover, and other featured people included fashion designers Kylie Jenner & Kendall Jenner of the Kardashian family, comedian Kevin Hart, actress Layla Kayleigh, and model Nazanin Mandi. An 8-page feature on trance musician Paul Oakenfold was also included, with pictures of a live performance in Las Vegas. Among the documented locations and events were the Burning Man festival, Morocco, and China (Harbin). A Bentley Continental GTC was also focused on.

== Catalog ==
No.	Release date	Cover model	Publishing info
WMB 3D; Issue 1	August 8, 2011	Kim Kardashian	200 pages (100 pages in 2D & 100 pages in 3D)
WMB 3D; Issue 2	January 5, 2012	Gabrielle Union	218 pages (109 pages in 2D & 109 pages in 3D)
WMB 3D; Issue 3	June 1, 2013	Estella Warren	226 pages (113 pages in 2D & 113 pages in 3D)

== See also ==
- Fashion photography
- 3D photography
