= Melanie Iglesias =

American model and actress (born 1987)

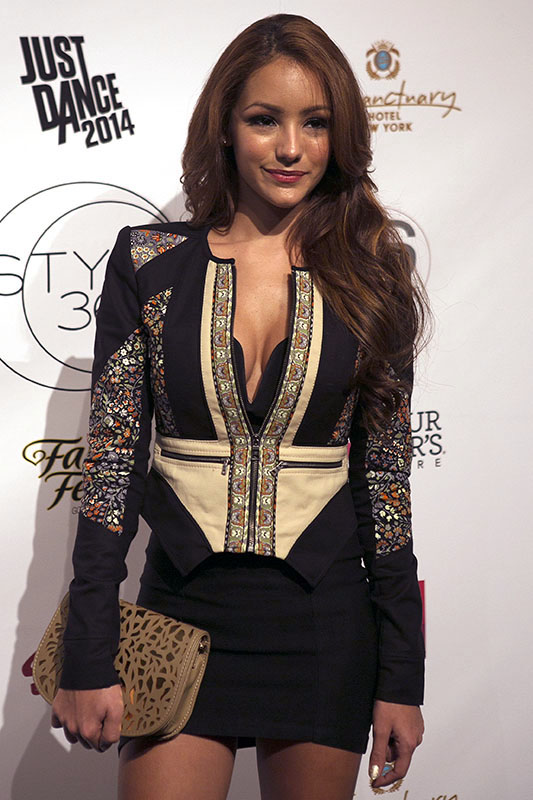
- Melanie in 2013 during New York Fashion Week
- Born: June 18, 1987 (age 39); Brooklyn, New York, U.S.
- Occupations: Model, actress, TV personality
- Years active: 2010–present
- Relatives: Alyssa Iglesias
- Modeling information
- Agency: Red Model Management

Melanie Iglesias (born June 18, 1987, in Brooklyn, New York) is an American model and actress. After being voted Maxim's "Hometown Hotties" winner in 2010, she has been featured in magazines such as World's Most Beautiful, Esquire, and Vibe.

Iglesias has appeared in the World Poker Tour series and also appeared as herself on all seasons of Guy Code on MTV2 and Girl Code, on MTV, and in the Guy Code spin off Guy Court.

== Early life ==
Melanie Iglesias was born in Brooklyn, New York. Iglesias is of Puerto Rican, Italian, and Filipino heritage. She graduated from Tottenville High School in Tottenville, Staten Island in New York City.

== Career ==
In 2010, Iglesias was voted Maxim's Hometown Hotties winner, and in 2011 Maxim placed her on their annual list for the world's most beautiful women, the "Maxim Hot 100". She was also featured on a special edition cover of Maxim USA, which was on stands for three consecutive months. She was number 87 on FHM 100 Sexiest of 2015.

In 2011, she was featured in the premiere issue of World's Most Beautiful, a 3D magazine photographed by celebrity photographer Nick Saglimbeni. She won the number two slot in Vibe Magazine's "30 Sexiest Celebrities Under 30".

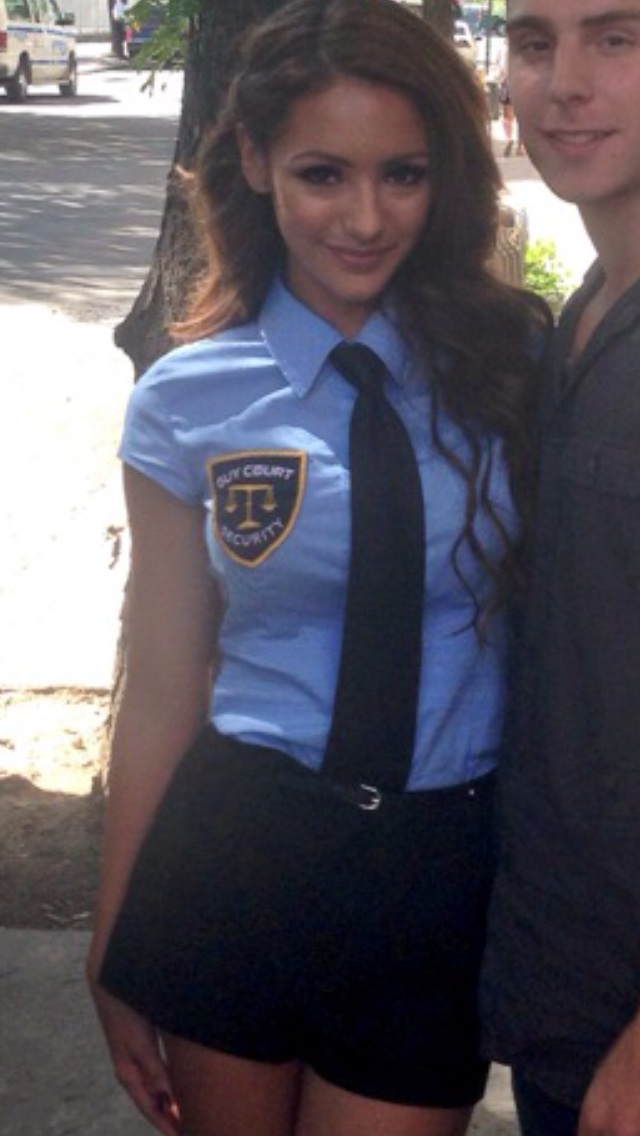
Iglesias at the set of MTV's Guy Court in 2013, where she plays the bailiff

Iglesias appeared as the Royal Flush Girl in 265 episodes of the World Poker Tour. She has appeared as herself on all three seasons of Guy Code, and was then cast in a spin-off show called Girl Code which airs on MTV every Thursday. She is also starring in yet another Guy Code spin off, Guy Court as the bailiff. She also starred in several feature films, including, Abnormal Attraction released in March 2018.

She appeared in Bryce Vine's music video for "La La Land" in April 2019.

== Filmography ==
- World Poker Tour – Royal Flush Girl
- Guy Code – herself (2011–13)
- Girl Code – herself (2013)
- Guy Court – bailiff (2013)
- MLB Off the Bat – herself (2014)
- Tosh.0 – Stacey (2014)
- The Keys of Christmas - Sexy Elf (2016)
- Unusual Heroes - Mean Girl (2017)
- Abnormal Attraction - Catherine (2018)
- Orange Is the New Black - Talia (2018)
- In Da Arcade - Melanie (2018)
