= 1995 FINA World Junior Synchronised Swimming Championships =

International synchronised swimming competition

The 4th FINA World Junior Synchronised Swimming Championships was held July 20–23, 1995 in Bonn, Germany. The synchronised swimmers are aged between 15 and 18 years old from 28 nations, swimming in three events: Solo, Duet and Team.

== Participating nations ==
28 nations swam at the 1995 World Junior Championships were:

- Belarus
- Brazil
- Bulgaria
- Canada
- China
- Colombia
- Czech Republic
- Egypt
- France
- Germany
- Great Britain
- Greece
- Hungary
- Israel
- Italy
- Japan
- Kazakhstan
- Korea
- Mexico
- Netherlands
- Russia
- Slovakia
- South Africa
- Spain
- Switzerland
- USA
- Uzbekistan
- FR Yugoslavia

== Results ==
| Event | Gold | | Silver | | Bronze | |
|---|---|---|---|---|---|---|
| Solo details | Olga Brusnikina; Russia | 93.089 | Virginie Dedieu; France | 89.819 | Estella Warren; Canada | 89.533 |
| Duet details | Olga Brusnikina; Alexandra Vassina; Russia | 90.871 | Riho Nakajima; Yoko Isoda; Japan | 88.802 | Elicia Marshall; Alanna O'Leary (United States) USA | 88.183 |
| Team details | Canada | 90.747 | Japan | 89.482 | Russia | 89.416 |
