= Beauty and the Beast (2009 film) =

- film poster
- Directed by: David Lister
- Based on: Beauty and the Beast by Gabrielle-Suzanne Barbot de Villeneuve
- Produced by: Dale G. Bradley; Grant Bradley; Dana Dubovsky; Mark L. Lester; Richard Stewart
- Cinematography: Nino Gaetano Martinetti
- Edited by: Brad Lindenmayer
- Production companies: American World Pictures; Limelight International
- Distributed by: Barnholtz Entertainment, United States
- Release date: 4 November 2009 (United States)
- Running time: 90 minutes
- Country: Australia
- Language: English

Beauty and the Beast is a 2009 Australian fantasy film directed by David Lister and starring Estella Warren, Rhett Giles, and Victor Parascos, and loosely based upon the fairy tale of the same name. The film was released in 2009 on video under that title and aired in 2010 on Syfy television as Beauty and the Beasts: A Dark Tale.

== Plot ==
The movie begins with King Maxililian (Tony Thurbon) in his death bed with his relatives fighting amongst each other to be the heir. Count Rudolph (Rhett Giles) murders his cousin who was the leading contender for the throne.

The scene cuts to Belle (Estella Warren) who is the daughter of the village washerwoman. She displays her intellect right from the start as we can see her working on her scented washing mixtures. Belle heads out to the forest in search of more herbs. A wolf attacks Belle but gets shot by an arrow before it could harm her. The arrow was shot by the beast (Victor Parascos) who is believed to be a legend, a false tale. When Belle approaches it the beast scares her off by shooting his crossbow towards her, she proceeds to run away.

Around this time the count and his men are going through the woods. The soldiers men find Belle and bring her to the count, she explains about her encounter with the Beast in the forest, at first the count suggests it might've been her imagination but after her persistence the count believes her words. One of his men suggests killing the beast to win the people's favor. The count along with his men go with Belle to find the beast. One of his men is attacked and killed viciously. They believe it was the beast.

They follow and corner the beast to a village. Here Belle learns that the beast isn't evil or dangerous from one of the villagers. The count sends his men to follow the beast into the forest. Belle now searches for the beast and finds his hideout. There they find out the true culprit behind the murders a troll created by Lady Helen. The two talk and bond, Belle discovers the Beast is more than just a monster. He's a kind-hearted man cursed with a monstrous appearance and wrongly accused of the killings.

The count Rudolph and Lady Helen form a partnership to frame the beast then slay him to get the throne. During the night Belle is captured by one of the counts men and brought back to the Rudolph. Helen uses her magic to look into Belle's memory, the count sends Belle to be imprisoned in the basement but she manages to escape. Helen's suggests Rudolph that the Beast might've been King Maxililian's son who was thought to be dead at birth, she believes the beast could be a hurdle for them to get the throne. Helen tricks the beast into thinking Belle is in danger and sends him to her house, where she had sent the troll to kill Belle's mother. The count makes his staged entrance exactly when the troll finishes its job and the beast can be framed. Just as Rudolph's about to execute the beast he is interrupted as the law requires anyone to be put on trial before execution.

While the beast is in prison Belle finds out about his past, turns out Helen had cursed the king's child and caused to be born deformed. Noone knew of the child's existence not even the king. Belle goes to the prison and tells the beast about his past; about how he's supposed to be the prince. In attempt to break Helen's spell Belle kisses the beast through the jail cell but it doesn't work.

The next day on the trial, the count makes his men fake testimonies and frames the beast. The court sentences him guilty and prepares for his execution. Just before the execution Belle saves her and the two run away towards the forest. Helen's troll betrays her and stops obeying her commands. The beast and Belle confront Helen, she tries to kill both of them. Beast in an attempt to save Belle and kills Helen. Then the two go confront Rudolph. Beast tells everyone about his past and how he's supposed to be the rightful heir to the throne. Helen's troll now serving Rudolph holds Belle captive and demand the beast to relinquish his position and appoint Rudolph as the next king. The two parties battle and the Beast emerges victorious. The curse on the beast ends and we see him turn back into his human form. The kingdom was now ruled by Belle and the beast now in his human form and the country saw a peaceful time under their reign.

== Cast ==
- Estella Warren as Belle
- Rhett Giles as Count Rudolph
- Victor Parascos as The Beast
- Vanessa Gray as Lady Helen
- Peter Cook as Duke Edward
- Nicholas G. Cooper as Duke Henry
- Gabriella Di Labio as Anna
- Tony Bellette as Otto
- Damien Garvey as Dr. Thorne
- Anthony Kidd as Kurt
- Todd Levi as Baron Conrad
- Tony Thurbon as King Maxililian
- Alex Kuzelicki as Troll

== Production ==
The project was filmed in Australia at locations on the Gold Coast and at studios at the Village Roadshow Studios adjacent to Warner Bros. Movie World in Queensland.

== Reception ==
Variety reviewed the film and offered that it was "an odd, bloody, cheaply made" adaptation "designed not for kids, but young guys heading toward a date with a Sunday-morning hangover." Toward the film as a "re-imagining" of the beloved Beauty and the Beast, they offered that Disney Studios "needn't lose any sleep." Other critical reception for the film was negative, with The Trades writing "Shun this ugly duckling, and hope that the future plans for other retellings from SyFy learn from this one's mistakes." Dread Central panned the film, criticizing the chemistry between Estella Warren and Victor Parascos, stating "Xena and her female sidekick Gabrielle shared more sexual chemistry than these two." New Zealand-based review site Mori.co.nz praised Rhett Giles' acting but criticised the film as a whole. Tor.com reviewed the film, saying "SyFy seems to have given this venture the same short shrift it's given all its other movies, and their premiere effort ends up simply [beast-related pun]". Filmink negatively reviewed Beauty and the Beast, calling it "a spectacular calamity that genuinely has no saving graces whatsoever."

Conversely, Monsters & Critics praised the film "for all its camp, overwrought acting, diabolical machinations and just plain old silly B-movie fun" and concluded their review by writing, "Given all the horrible, sad news going on in the world especially today, Beauty is just what the doctor ordered for a short respite from the misery."
