= Blue Seduction =

Blue Seducton
- DVD cover
- Directed by: Timothy Bond
- Written by: Jacqueline Giroux
- Produced by: Jacqueline Giroux; Benoit Martin
- Starring: Billy Zane; Estella Warren
- Cinematography: Philip Hurn
- Edited by: Marc Savoie
- Music by: Richard Wade
- Production companies: B&J Production
- Distributed by: Starz Media; Anchor Bay Entertainment; Eagle Films
- Release date: December 16, 2009 (US)
- Running time: 91 min (DVD cut)
- Country: Canada
- Language: English

Blue Seduction is a 2009 Canadian erotic thriller directed by Remi Adefarasin and starring Billy Zane and Estella Warren. It was filmed in New Brunswick, Canada.

== Plot ==
Mikey Taylor is a once-famous rock star in long-time retirement. Everything was as usual in his previous life, parties, drugs, casual sex, with different women, until he met his future wife, Joyce, a broker in a reputable real estate company, who helped him cope with his dangerous addictions. But along comes his big fan, a gorgeous young woman, who wants to use him to become famous herself. To achieve her goal, she seduces Mikey with alcohol, cocaine, and rough sex, leading him to his near self-destruction.

== Cast ==
- Billy Zane as Mikey Taylor
- Estella Warren as Matty
- Jane Wheeler as Joyce
- Bernard Robichaud as Stanley
- Robbie O'Neill as Dickie Kline
- Elizabeth Stevens as Jan

== Review ==
Throughout this entire film I kept wondering "What the hell happened to Billy Zane?" He's certainly been in some sexy thrillers in his time. I loved the man when he was torturing Nicole Kidman on a boat in Dead Calm, and he was creepy awesome in Demon Knight. For Blue Seduction it looks like someone rolled Billy off a couch he had been passed out on for the last few months, and told him to emote through a four-day drinking binge. He mumbles lines, breaks character, wears a ridiculous wig, and looks like he's been eating terribly enough to insure there are not many shirtless scenes. He always seems to be acting from inside a haze, and it gets annoying all too quickly. This is not the guy I remember from the '90s. Estella Warren fares a little better, but only by a hair. In this case, I mean hair literally. She seems awake, looks quite a bit fresher, and doesn't have to rely on wigs. But a scene in revealing lingerie displays she was probably right next to Billy Zane in the buffet line. It seems the producers want to make this more attractive by advertising "Songs performed by Estella Warren," but that turns out to be pretty bad too. The tunes themselves sound like reheated '80s power ballads, and she adds no power to her vocals. So we have Estella Warren looking heavy and sounding like what you'd expect a swimsuit model to sing like.

—Brett Cullum, DVD Verdict
