= Estella Warren =

Canadian actress, model (born 1978)

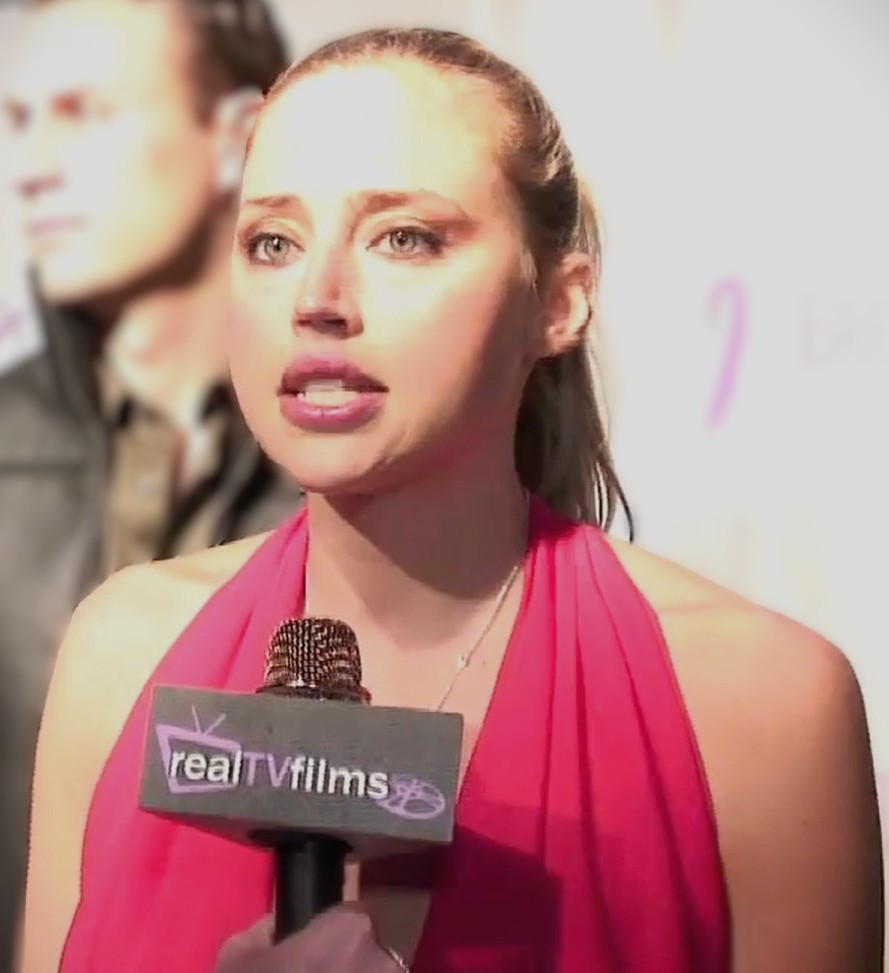
- Warren in 2011
- Born: December 23, 1978 (age 47); Peterborough, Ontario, Canada
- Occupations: Actress; model; swimmer
- Years active: 1990–present
- Height: 5 ft 9 in (1.75 m)

Estella Dawn Warren (born December 23, 1978) is a Canadian actress, fashion model and former synchronized swimmer. During her swimming career she was a member of the Canadian national team and won three national titles. Since 1994, she has been modelling through publications such as Sports Illustrated as well as working for campaigns for such brands as Perry Ellis and Victoria's Secret.

Warren later began a career as an actress, starring in such films as Tim Burton's 2001 re-adapted film Planet of the Apes, Kangaroo Jack, and Beauty and the Beast, as well as television roles in Ghost Whisperer, That '70s Show, and the Law & Order franchise. Her last release was the direct-to-video Undateable John, filmed in 2015 and released in 2019.

== Early life ==
Estella Warren was born in Peterborough, Ontario, Canada, to Esther, an elementary school headmistress, and Don Warren, a used-car dealer. She is the youngest of three daughters.

== Career ==
=== Synchronized swimming ===
In 1990, Warren moved to Toronto to train with the national synchronized swimming team. In 1995, after becoming the senior national champion, Warren had the chance to move on to the 1996 Summer Olympics. She is a three-time Canada national team champion and the solo bronze medallist at the 1995 Junior World Championships.

=== Fashion modeling ===
Estella Warren was discovered by Rhonda Broadbelt Fonte, the owner of Broadbelt & Fonte Models, in 1994 when she was a synchronized swimmer living in Ontario. Broadbelt Fonte then introduced Warren to George Gallier, the owner of American Models. She then went to New York City to shoot some photo tests. During that time, Gallier introduced her to fashion photographer Ellen Von Unwerth, who booked her for a photo shoot for Italian Vogue.

She began her international modelling career with the Cacharel fragrance campaign "Eau d'Eden" in 1996, with French photographer director Jean-Paul Goude. The Chanel No. 5 campaign with director Luc Besson followed in 1998; both campaigns happened while she was managed by George Gallier.

Warren has appeared on the cover of Vogue, Vanity Fair, Elle, Cosmopolitan, and in two television commercials for Chanel No. 5 perfume. Warren was ranked Number 1 on Maxim's Hot 100 List in 2000 when she was 21. She was ranked Number 52 in FHM's "100 Sexiest Women in the World 2006" special supplement and was the November 2007 entry in Stuff magazine's pinup calendar.

Warren also has appeared in campaigns for UGG Australia, Andrew Marc, Perry Ellis, Nine West, Cartier, Volvo, De Beers and Cacharel, as well as in television advertisements for Samsung. Additionally, she has modelled for Victoria's Secret and hosted the television special for the 2000 Sports Illustrated Swimsuit Issue.

She posed nude for the cover of the third issue of the 3D magazine World's Most Beautiful, which came out in June 2013.

=== Acting ===
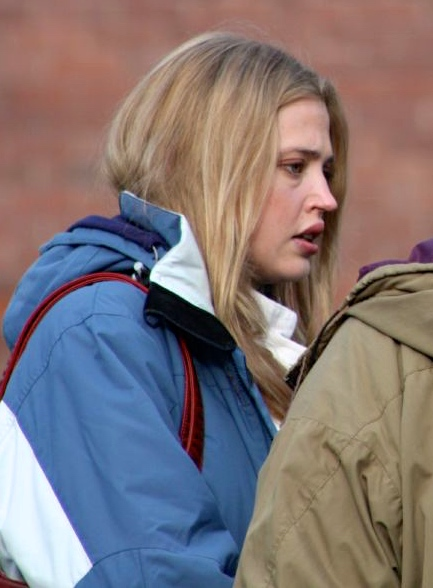
Warren on the set of Blue Seduction, 2008

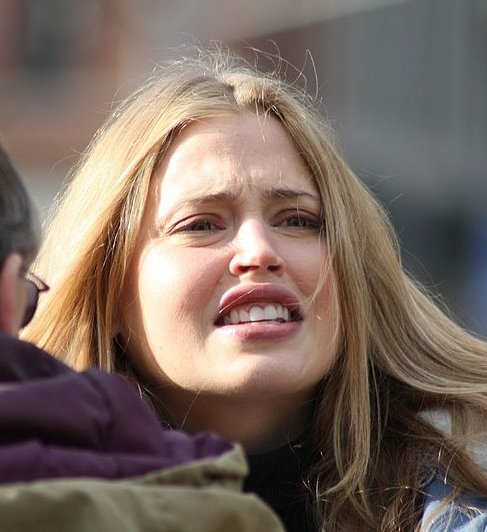
Warren shooting Blue Seduction in Fredericton, New Brunswick, November 2008

Warren's films include Driven (2001), Planet of the Apes (2001), Kangaroo Jack (2003), The Cooler (2003), Stranger Within (2013) and Just Within Reach (2017).

Warren appeared in That '70s Show in 2003, as well as a two-part crossover role in Law & Order and Law & Order: Special Victims Unit in September 2005. She also appeared in an episode of Ghost Whisperer in 2005.

Warren has appeared in music videos for INXS's "Afterglow", Blank & Jones' "Beyond Time" and Dr. Dre's "I Need a Doctor". She also appeared in the film Just Within Reach with Lenny Von Dohlen, Alex Cubis, Tami Romen and Thomas Duffy.

== Personal life ==
=== Legal issues ===
On May 24, 2011, Warren was arrested in Los Angeles after she allegedly hit three parked cars with her Toyota Prius and then fled the scene. Police eventually found her and arrested her for driving under the influence of alcohol (DUI). During her arrest she allegedly kicked an officer and resisted being handcuffed. Later, at the police station where her arrest was being booked, she managed to slip her cuffs and run, but was quickly recaptured. Ultimately she was charged with DUI, hit-and-run, battery on a police officer and resisting a police officer. Her bail was set at $100,000. On August 19, 2011, Warren entered a no-contest plea to the drunken driving charge and the other charges were dropped; she was ordered to a residential rehab facility for four months. The incident marks the second time Warren was convicted of drunk driving. Her first DUI conviction was in 2007.

The Los Angeles County Sheriff's Department recorded Warren's date of birth as December 23, 1970. Although Warren's 1978 birth year is well established, some news sources then reported that she was born in 1970 or cited her age as if she were born that year.

In 2017, Warren was arrested for domestic violence after allegedly throwing cleaning fluid at her boyfriend.

== Filmography ==
=== Film ===
Year	Title	Role	Notes
2001	Perfume	Arrianne	
2001	Driven	Sophia Simone	Razzie Award for Worst Supporting Actress
2001	Planet of the Apes	Daena	Razzie Award for Worst Supporting Actress
2001	Tangled	Elise Stevens	
2003	Kangaroo Jack	Jessie	
2003	The Cooler	Charlene	
2003	I Accuse	Kimberly Jansen	
2004	Blowing Smoke	Faye Grainger	Television film
2004	Pursued	Emily Keats	
2004	Trespassing	Kristy Goodman	
2005	Her Minor Thing	Jeana	
2006	Taphephobia	Jesse Lennox	
2006	National Lampoon's Pucked	Jessica	
2007	Lies and Crimes	Sally Hanson	Television film
2009	Blue Seduction	Matty	Television film
2009	Beauty and the Beast	Belle	
2010	Irreversi	Kat	
2010	Transparency	Monika	
2010	See You in September	Lindsay	
2013	The Stranger Within	Emily	
2013	Dangerous Intuition	Laura Beckman	Television film
2015	No Way Out	Maria	
2015	Decommissioned	Rebecca Niles	
2017	Just Within Reach	Grace	
2019	The Beginning: Feel the Dead	Skyler	
2019	Undateable John	Jane	Direct-to-video; filmed 2015

=== Television ===
Year	Title	Role	Notes
2003	That '70s Show	Raquel	Episode: "The Kids Are Alright"
2005	Law & Order: Special Victims Unit	April Troost	Episode: "Design"
2005	Law & Order	April Troost	Episode: "Flaw"
2005	Ghost Whisperer	Alexis Fogarty	Episode: "On the Wings of a Dove"
2009	Mental	Niobe Graham	Episode: "Book of Judges"
2010	The Being Frank Show		Episode #1.1
2017	Feel the Dead	Skyler	
2017	Age of the Living Dead	Michelle	

=== Music videos ===
Year	Title	Performer(s)	Ref.
2000	"Beyond Time"	Blank & Jones	
2006	"Afterglow"	INXS	
2011	"I Need a Doctor"	Dr. Dre, Eminem & Skylar Grey	
