= Stereo photography techniques =

Methods to produce stereoscopic images

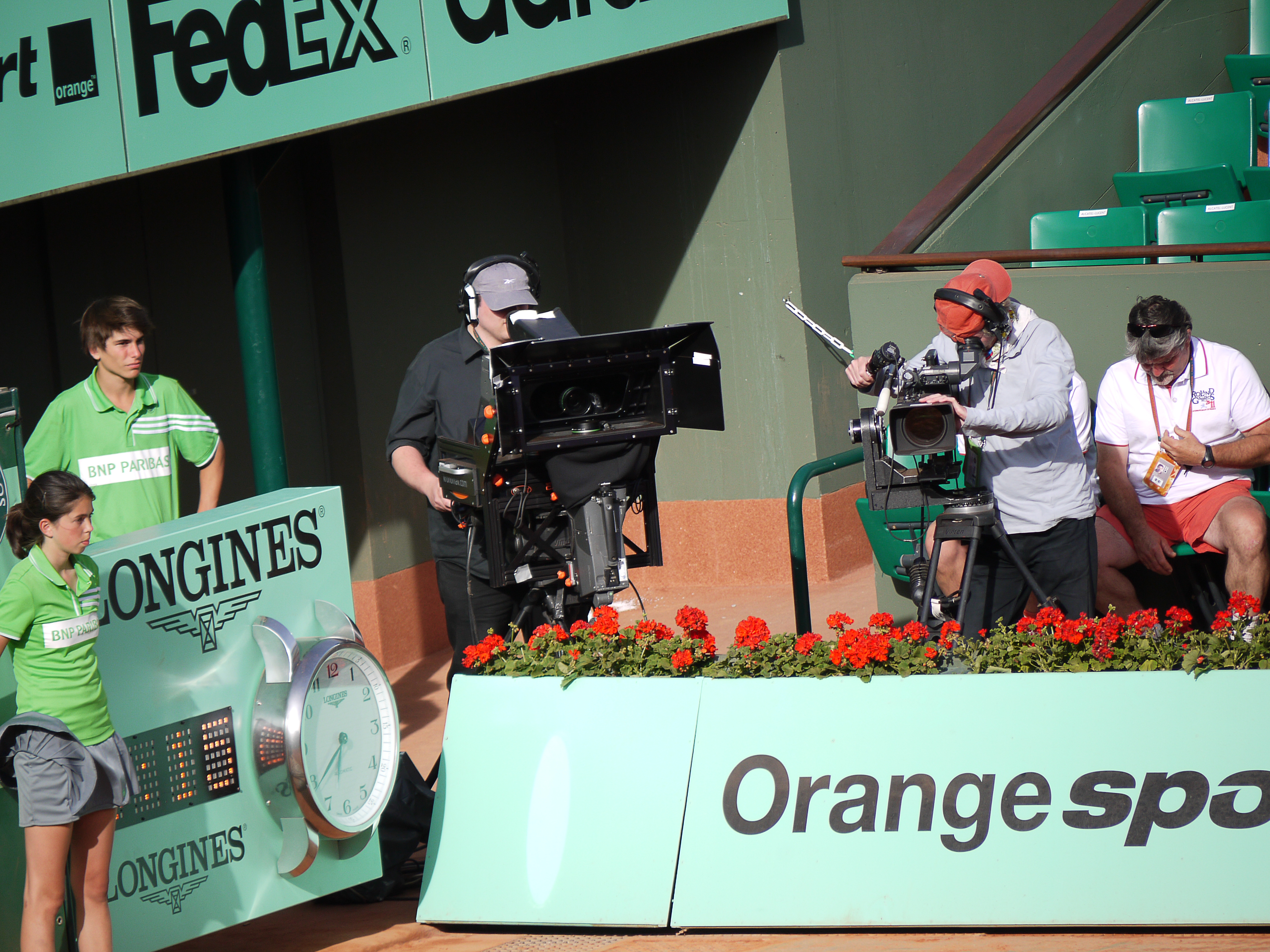
Modern stereo TV camera

Stereo photography techniques are methods to produce stereoscopic images, videos and films. This is done with a variety of equipment including special built stereo cameras, single cameras with or without special attachments, and paired cameras. This involves traditional film cameras as well as, tape and modern digital cameras. A number of specialized techniques are employed to produce different kinds of stereo images.

== Types of photography ==
=== Film photography ===
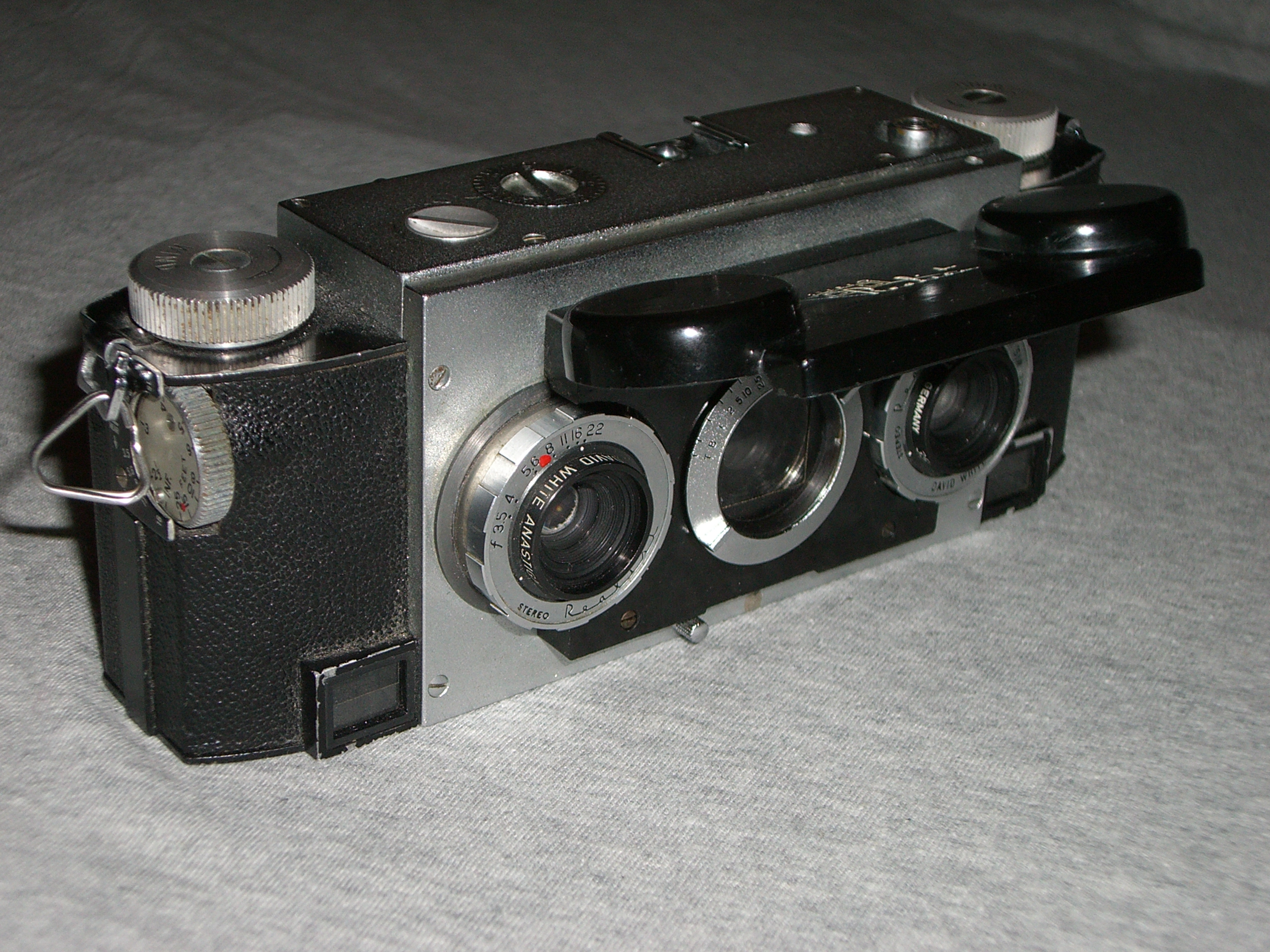
The Stereo Realist, which defined a new stereo format. The middle lens is for view-finding.

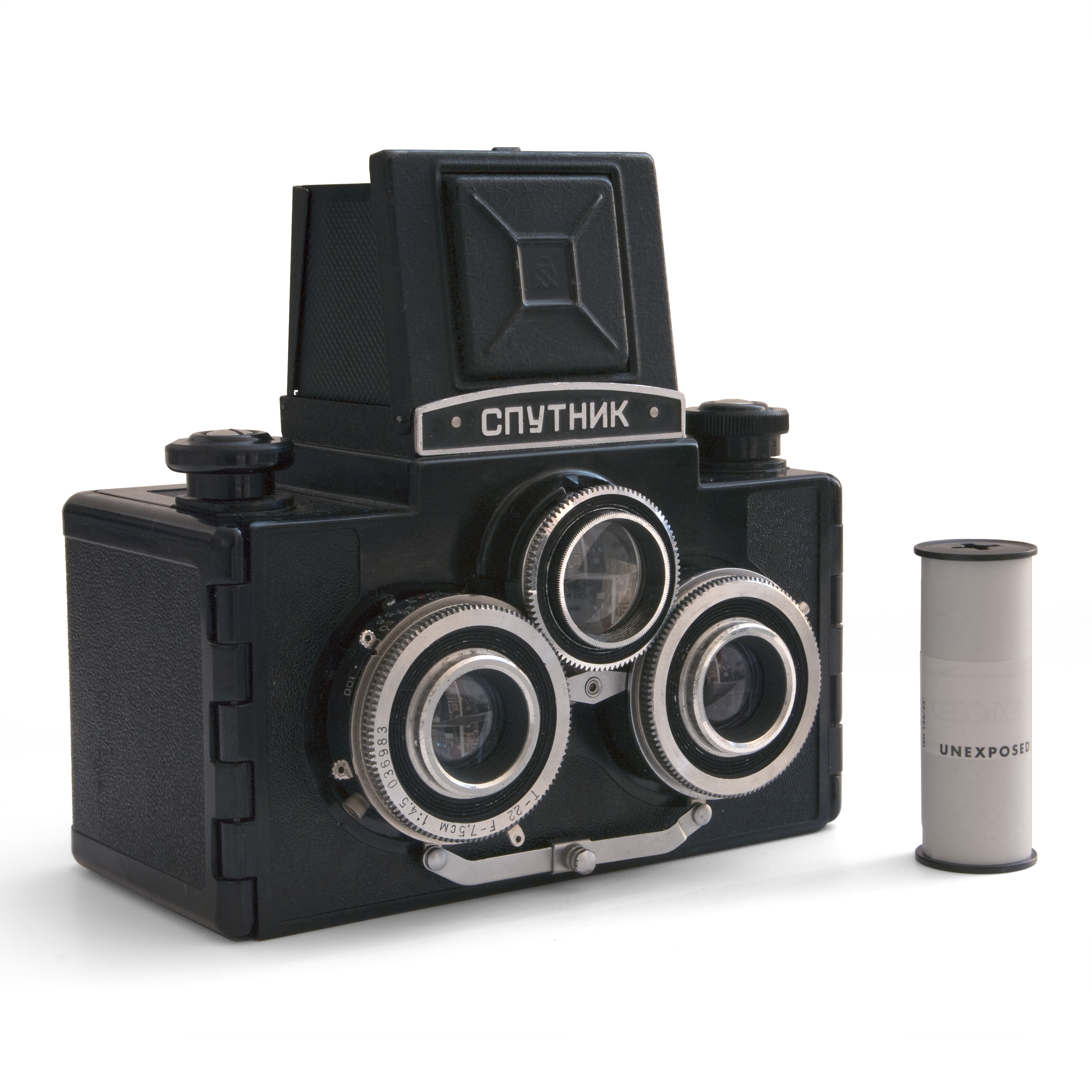
Sputnik stereo camera (Soviet Union, 1960s). Although there are three lenses present, only the lower two are used for the photograph – the third lens serves as a viewfinder for composition. The Sputnik produces two side-by-side square images on 120 film.

It is necessary to take two photographs from different horizontal positions to get a true stereoscopic image pair. This can be done with two separate side-by-side cameras, with one camera moved from one position to another between exposures, with one camera and a single exposure by means of an attached mirror or prism arrangement that presents a stereoscopic image pair to the camera lens, or with a stereo camera incorporating two or more side-by-side lenses.

Charles Wheatstone first began experimenting with stereopsis in 1838 using specially constructed drawings. The invention of photography in 1839 opened up a new and more detailed medium for his experiments and the first photographic stereoscopic pairs appeared in the early 1840s as Daguerreotypes and Calotypes. By the 1850s, a stereoscope and an assortment of professionally photographed stereo views were becoming part of the standard equipment of a properly furnished middle-class parlor. In the 1890s, photographic plates and films sensitive enough to make casual "snapshot" photography practical were available, and combined with easy-to-use cameras they were making amateur photography a very popular hobby. Stereo cameras were in the mix. The earliest were inconveniently large and the result was a pair of paper prints mounted on a card for viewing in a standard stereoscope. They were soon joined by smaller cameras that yielded relatively small stereo slides on glass. The popularity of stereo photography declined after the First World War and plummeted during the Great Depression of the 1930s.

In the late 1940s, compact imported European stereo cameras that used 35 mm slide film began appearing in the US market. The most notable example was the Verascope F40. These cameras featured a "7P" format, meaning that each image was 7 film perforations (sprocket holes) wide, yielding 11 stereo pairs on a 20-exposure roll of 35 mm film. Because these cameras (and some later models) came from Europe, this became known as the "European format".

In 1945, ads began appearing for an American camera known as the Stereo Realist. The camera was not actually available for purchase until 1947, but the ads generated a lot of excitement among stereo photography enthusiasts. The Stereo Realist featured a more compact 5P format, which soon became known as the "Realist format". It yielded 16 pairs on a 20-exposure roll and was therefore more economical than the 7P format. By 1952 several competitors were already marketing their own cameras using the 5P format, making it the de facto US industry standard. Several 5P format cameras were also made in Europe.

More compact and convenient than their pre-World War II predecessors, these cameras adopted the increasingly popular 135 film (35 mm) format that allowed the use of Kodachrome color film, which produced color transparencies ("slides") instead of prints on paper. The relative novelty of Kodachrome's vivid colors and the realism of 3-D were each attractive individually, but the astonishingly lifelike effect of the two combined proved irresistible to many consumers.

The new cameras were marketed with corresponding two-lensed Realist-format slide viewers, which typically had a built-in light source and adjustable optics. With only these two items the owner could capture, relive and share multicolored and stereoscopically preserved memories. For group viewing, a polarized stereoscopic slide projector, silverscreen, and polarized glasses could be added to the system. Other accessories were available, including equipment and supplies for those who preferred to mount their own slides. Both Realist Inc. and Kodak offered stereo mounting services for those who would rather not.

The popularity of amateur stereoscopic photography helped trigger a brief pop culture fad of 3D movies, 3D comic books, etc., which in turn helped to introduce new enthusiasts to the ranks of amateur stereo photographers. Unlike the pop culture 3D fad, which came and went quickly and was primarily a 1953 phenomenon, the popularity of amateur stereo photography started earlier, grew more slowly, peaked later, and declined more gradually. Eight new stereo cameras hit the market in 1954, including the Kodak Stereo Camera which may have driven several competitors out of the business. Kodak's stereo camera was not discontinued until 1959, Kodaslide stereo viewers were available until 1962, and the Realist continued in production, although ultimately in very small quantities, into 1971. Subsequent decades found new users replenishing the ranks of loyal devotees and supporting a solid market for second-hand equipment. Kodak's stereo mounting service was continued, through Qualex, into the early 1990s. Even today, despite the general transition from film to digital and from slide viewing and projection to slide scanning and video display, some of this sturdy equipment is still in use by a small core of enthusiasts of all ages.

The 1980s saw a minor revival of stereoscopic photography when several point-and-shoot stereo cameras were introduced. Most of these cameras suffered from poor optics and plastic construction and were designed to produce lenticular prints, a format which never gained wide acceptance, so they never gained the popularity of the 1950s stereo cameras.

In the 1990s, cameras came out that were intended to make stereo pairs, specifically designed to use print film, producing a half-frame format that could be viewed using freevision or the included print viewer, directly as it came from a standard processing lab. The original Loreo was the pioneer, but it was followed by several other cameras, including some designed to take macro shots.

=== Digital photography ===
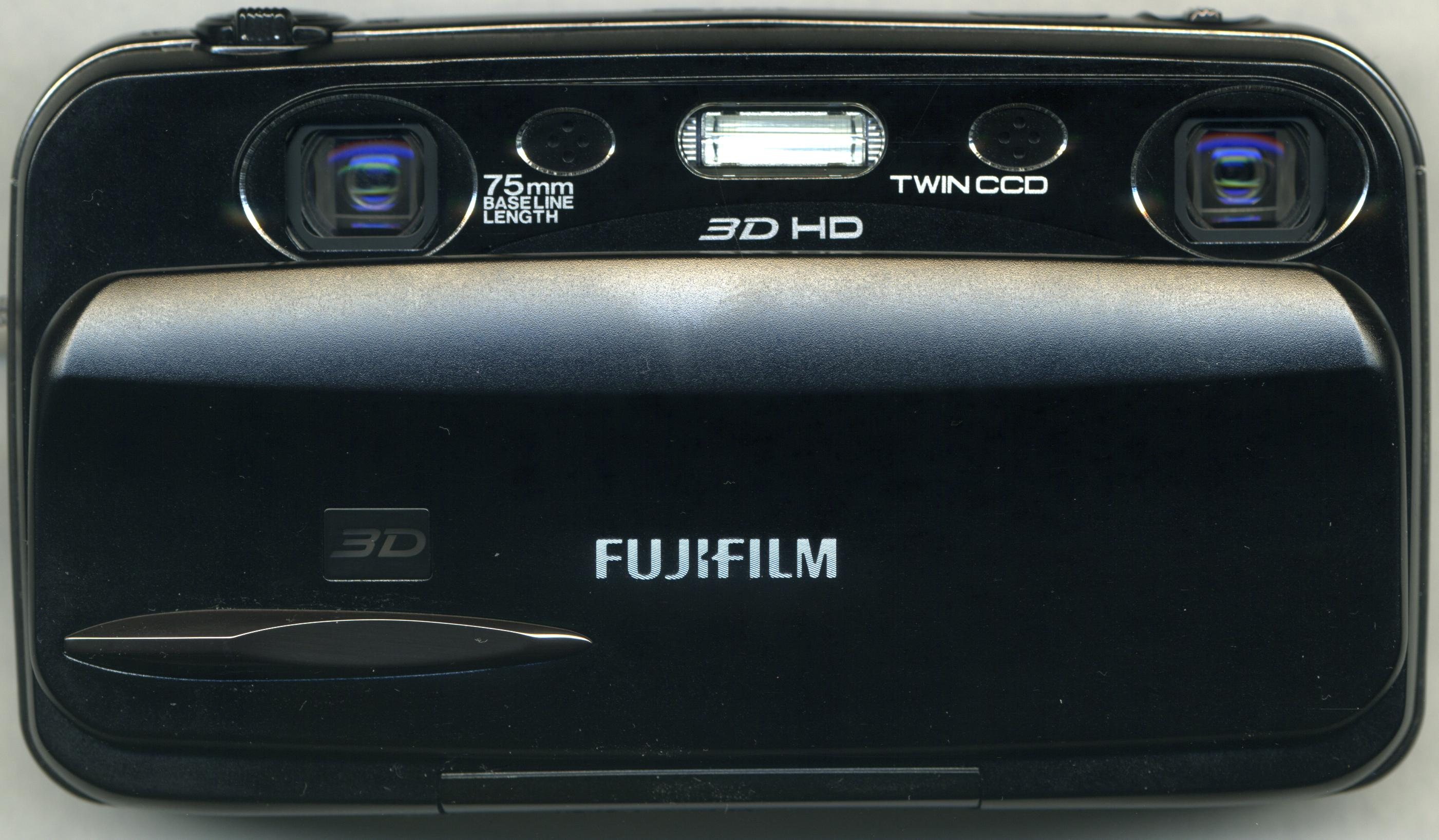
Fujifilm FinePix Real 3D W3

The beginning of the 21st century marked the coming of the age of digital photography. Stereo lenses were introduced which could turn an ordinary film camera into a stereo camera by using a special double lens to take two images and direct them through a single lens to capture them side by side on the film. These are also available for digital SLR cameras.

It is also possible to create a twin camera rig, together with a "shepherd" device to synchronize the shutter and flash of the two cameras. By mounting two cameras on a bracket, spaced a bit, with a mechanism to make both take pictures at the same time.

In 2009 digital stereo cameras such as the Fuji W1 began appearing in the consumer market. Several companies joined the digital stereo market, producing digital stereo cameras that sold for as little as $100. 3D capability was even added to some smartphones.

Newer cameras, such as the Fuji W3, can also be used to shoot full motion 480P video at up 30 frames per second or 720p video at 24 frames per second, thus making amateur 3D video possible. Some cameras can also take images that greatly exceed HDTV resolution at up to ten pictures per second.

If anything is in motion within the field of view, it is necessary to take both images at once, either through use of a specialized two-lens camera or by using two identical cameras operated as close as possible to the same moment.

A single camera can also be used if the subject remains perfectly still (such as an object in a museum display). Two exposures are required. The camera can be moved on a sliding bar for offset, or with practice, the photographer can simply shift the camera while holding it straight and level. This method of taking stereo photos is sometimes referred to as the "Cha-Cha" or "Rock and Roll" method. It is also sometimes referred to as the "astronaut shuffle" because it was used to take stereo pictures on the surface of the Moon using normal monoscopic equipment.

=== Digital stereo bases (baselines) ===
There are different cameras with different stereo bases (distances between the two camera lenses) in the nonprofessional market of 3D digital cameras used for stills and video:

- ? mm Inlife-Handnet HDC-810
- 10 mm Panasonic 3D Lumix H-FT012 lens (for the GH2, GF2, GF3, GF5, GF6 cams and also for the hybrid W8 cam).
- 12 mm DXG-5D8 cam and the clones Medion 3D and Praktica DMMC-3D.
- 15 mm Ararat Macro Beam Splitter for smartphones.
- 20 mm Sony Bloggie 3D (MHS-FS3).
- 23 mm Loreo 3D Macro lens.
- 25 mm LG Optimus 3D, LG Optimus 3D MAX (smartphones) and the Cyclopital3D close-up macro adapter (for the W1 and W3 Fujifilm cams).
- 28 mm Sharp Aquos SH80F and SHI12 (smartphones) and the Toshiba Camileo z100 camcorder.
- 30 mm Panasonic 3D1 camera.
- 32 mm HTC EVO 3D smartphone.
- 35 mm JVC TD1, DXG-5G2V, VTech Kidizoom 3D, GoPro HD Hero kit 3D, Nintendo 3D, Vivitar 790 HD (only for anaglyph stills and video), and AEE 3D Magicam.
- 40 mm Aiptek I2 (also the Viewsonic clone), Aiptek I2P Aiptek IS2 and Aiptek IH3 3D cams.
- 50 mm Loreo for full frame or non digital cams, and the 3D FUN cam of 3dInlife (also the clones Phenix PHC1, Phenix SDC821 and Rollei Powerflex 3D).
- 55 mm SVP dc-3D-80 cam (parallel & anaglyph, stills & video).
- 60 mm Vivitar 3D cam (only for anaglyph pictures).
- 65 mm Takara Tomy 3D ShotCam.
- 65 mm Kandao QooCam EGO 3D Camera.
- 75 mm Fujifilm W3 cam.
- 77 mm Fujifilm W1 cam.
- 88 mm Loreo 3D lens for digital cams.
- 140mm Cyclopital3D base extender for the JVC TD1 and Sony TD10.
- 200mm Cyclopital3D base extender for the Panasonic AG-3DA1.
- 225mm Cyclopital3D base extender for the Fujifilm W1 and W3 cams.

== Base line selection ==
Stereo image
Left frame
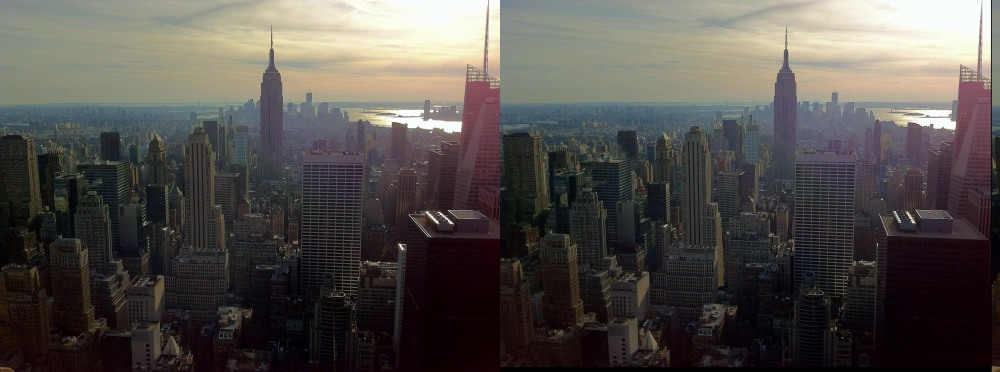
Right frame
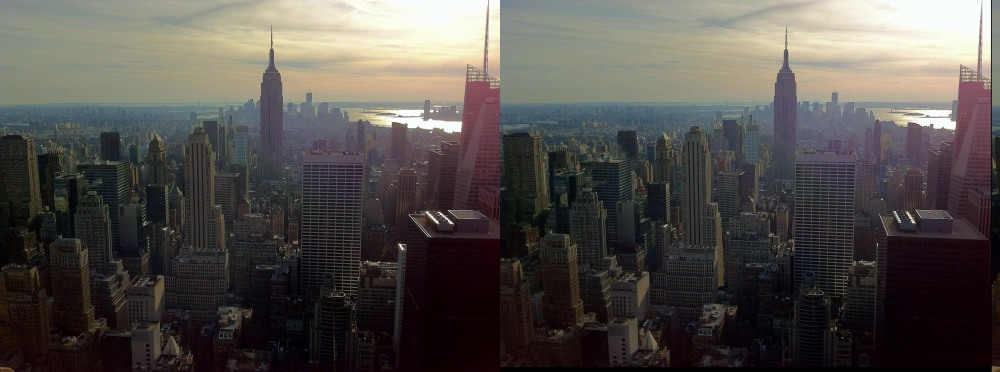
Parallel view
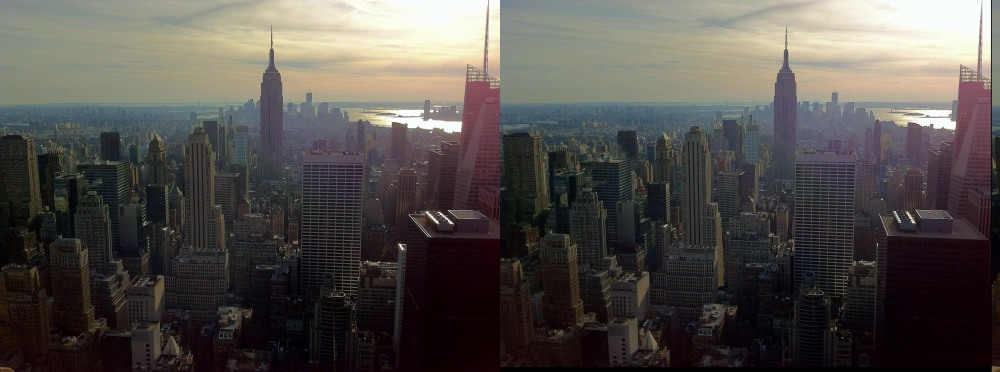
Cross-eye view
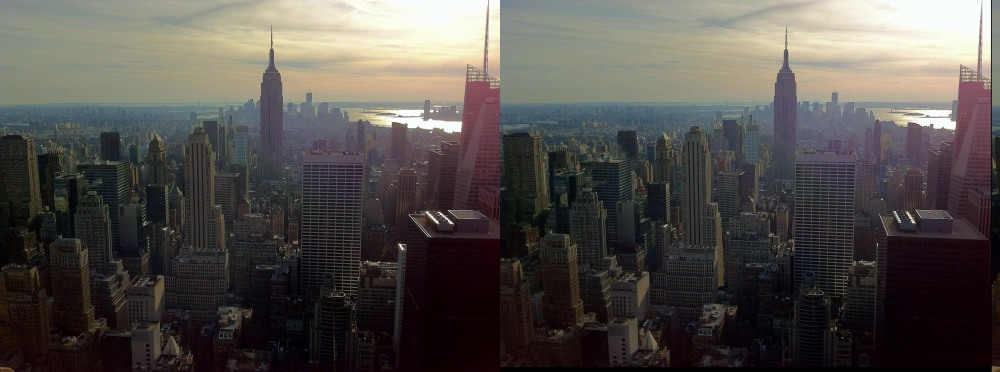

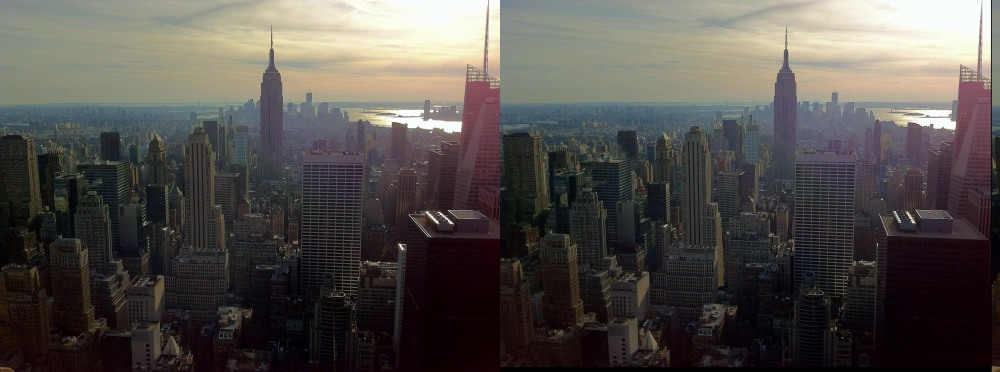
- Midtown manhattan stereo photograph

For general purpose stereo photography, where the goal is to duplicate natural human vision and give a visual impression as close as possible to actually being there, the correct baseline (distance between where the right and left images are taken) would be the same as the distance between the eyes. When images taken with such a baseline are viewed using a viewing method that duplicates the conditions under which the picture is taken then the result would be an image pretty much the same as what would be seen at the site the photo was taken. This could be described as "ortho stereo."

An example would be the Realist format that was so popular in the late 1940s to mid-1950s and is still being used by some today. When these images are viewed using high-quality viewers, or seen with a properly set-up projector, the impression is, indeed, very close to being at the site of photography. Of course, it is seldom possible to duplicate the exact conditions under which the photo is taken, just as it is rarely possible to exactly match the original colors, but ortho stereo tries to duplicate the natural stereo impression as close as possible just as color photography tries to give a natural impression of color, even if it isn't an exact match.

The baseline used in such cases will be about 50mm to 80mm. This is what is generally referred to as a "normal" baseline, used in most stereo photography. There are, however, situations where it might be desirable to use a longer or shorter baseline. The factors to consider include the viewing method to be used and the goal in taking the picture. Note that the concept of baseline also applies to other branches of stereography, such as stereo drawings and computer-generated stereo images, but it involves the point of view chosen rather than actual physical separation of cameras or lenses.

=== Longer base line for distant objects – "Hyper Stereo" ===
Stereo image
Left frame
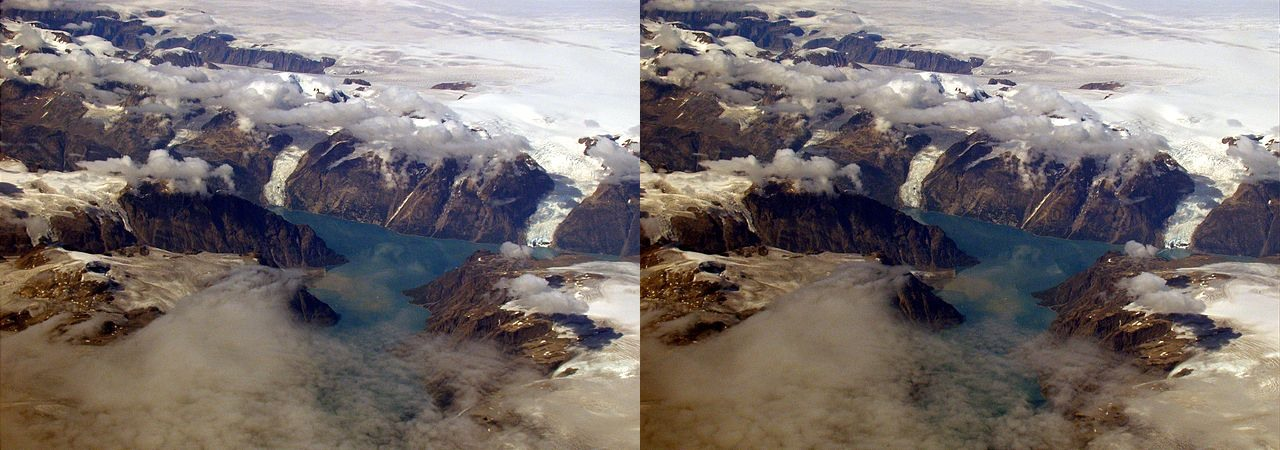
Right frame
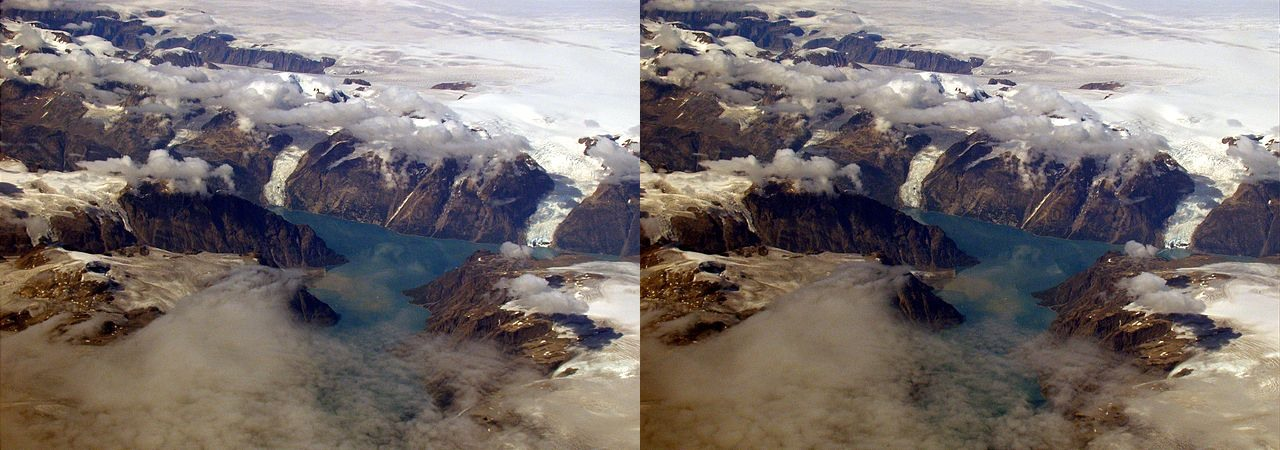
Parallel view
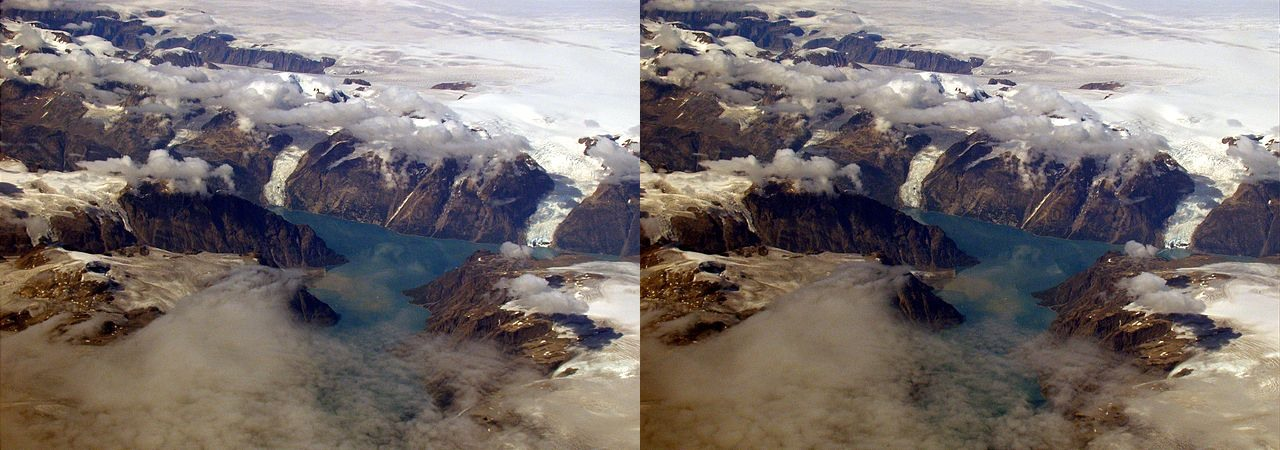
Cross-eye view
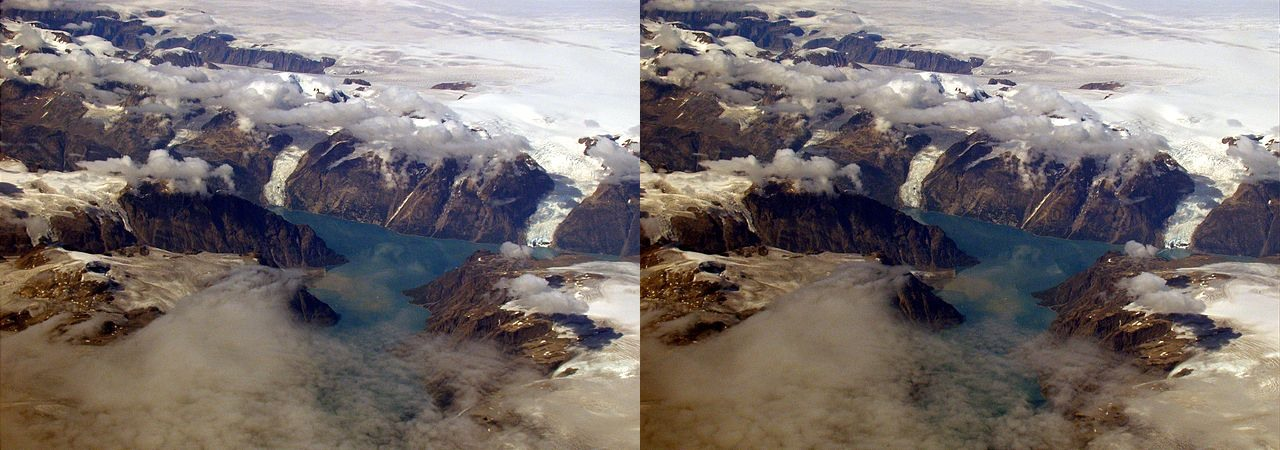

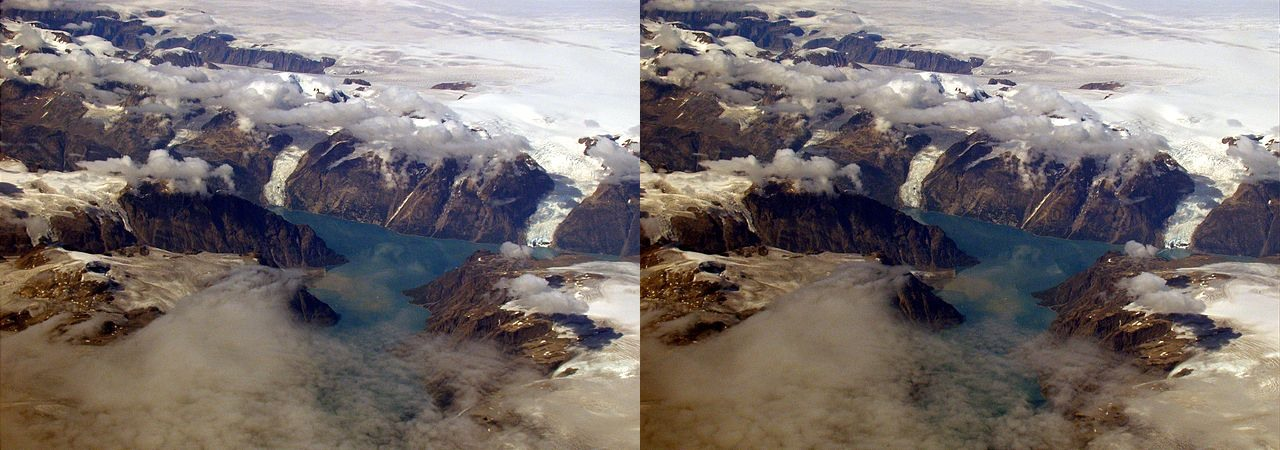
- Hyperstereo example taken out from airplane while flying over Greenland

Stereo image
Left frame
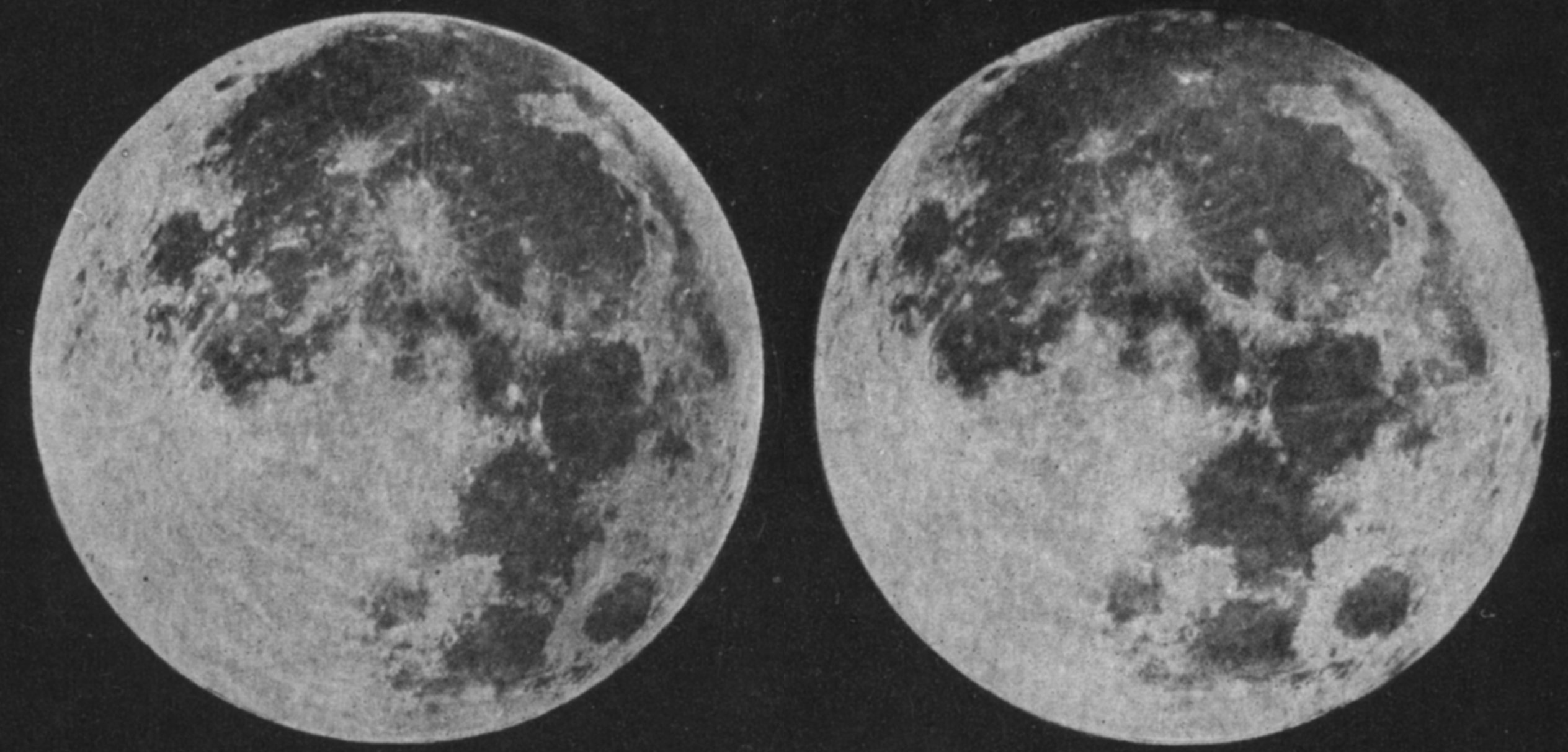
Right frame
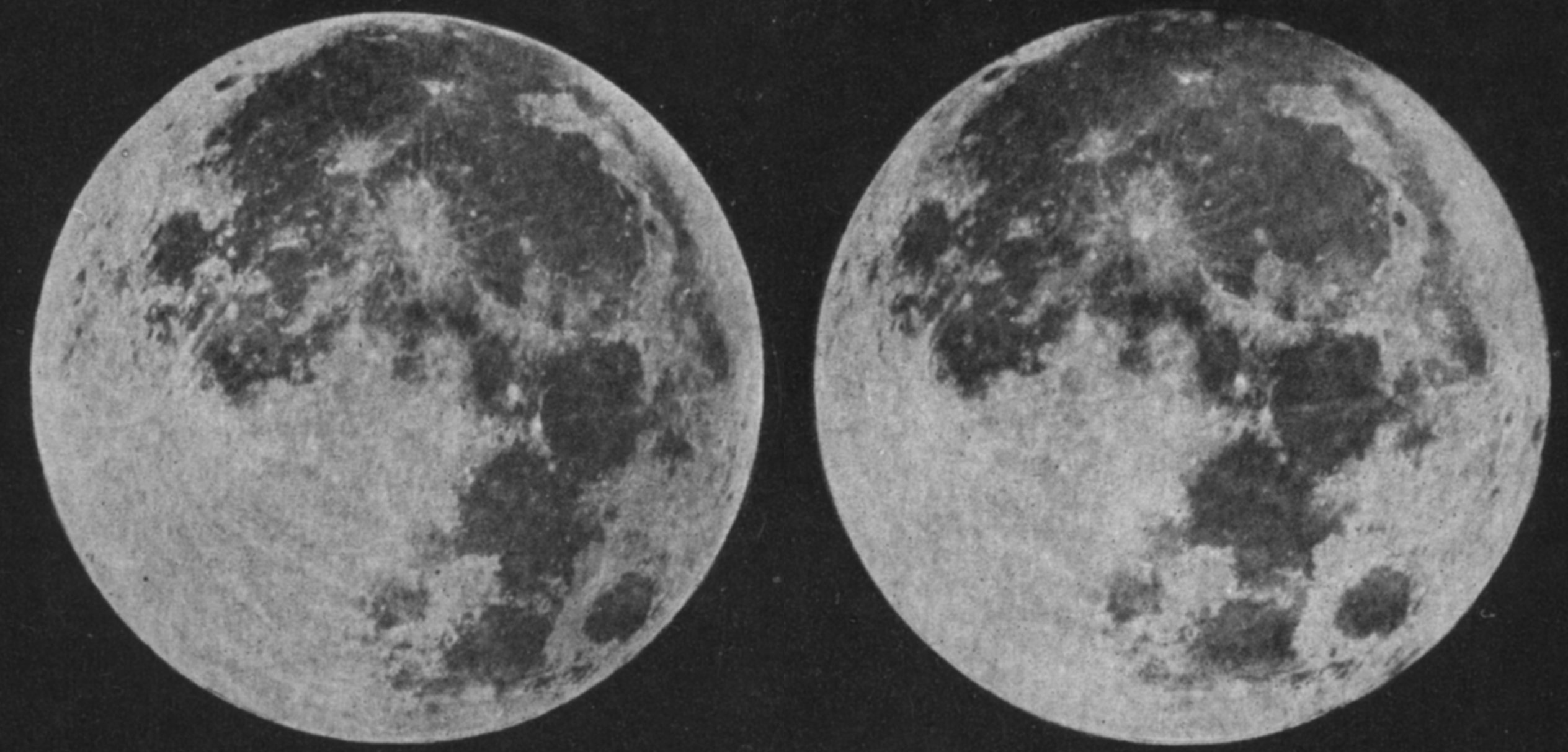
Parallel view
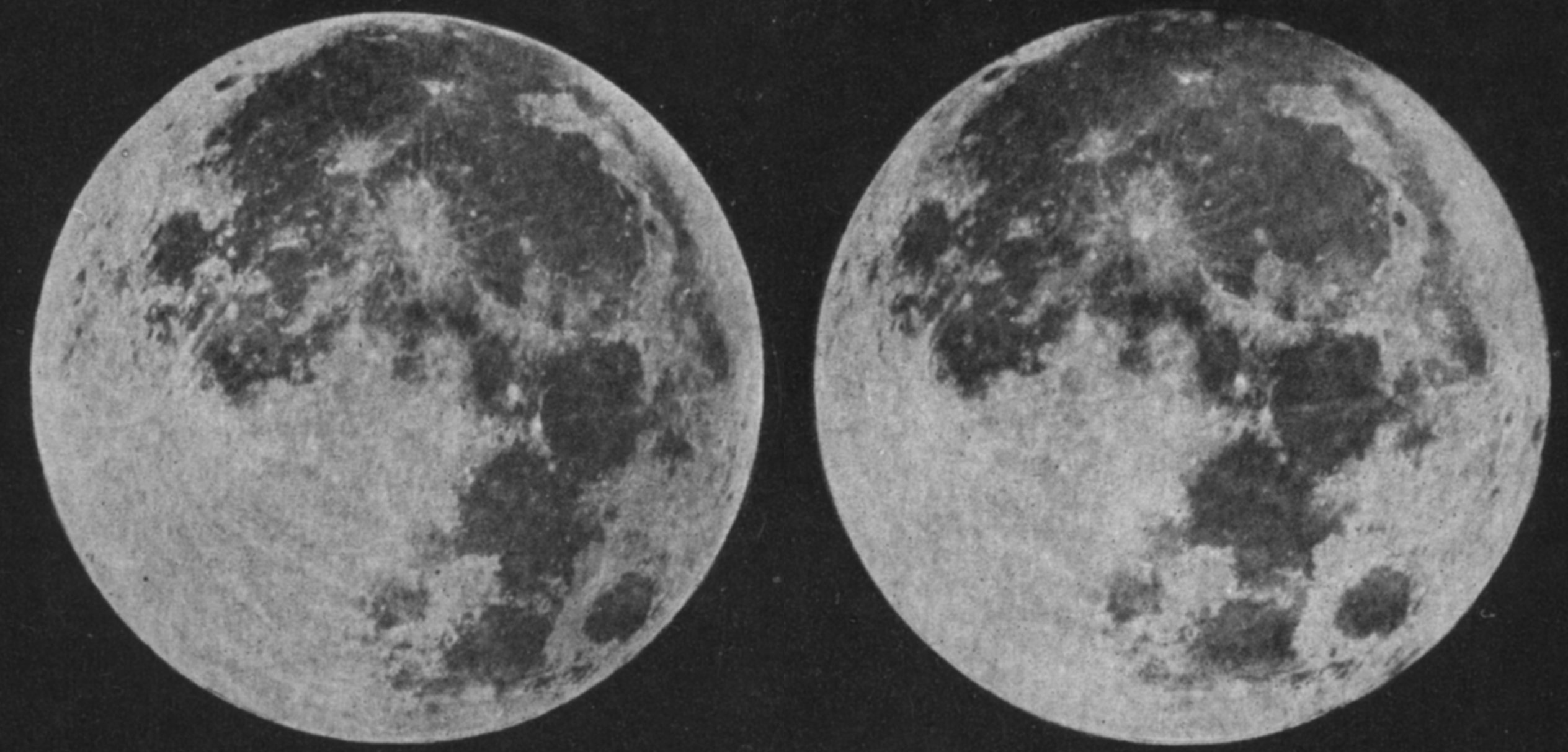
Cross-eye view
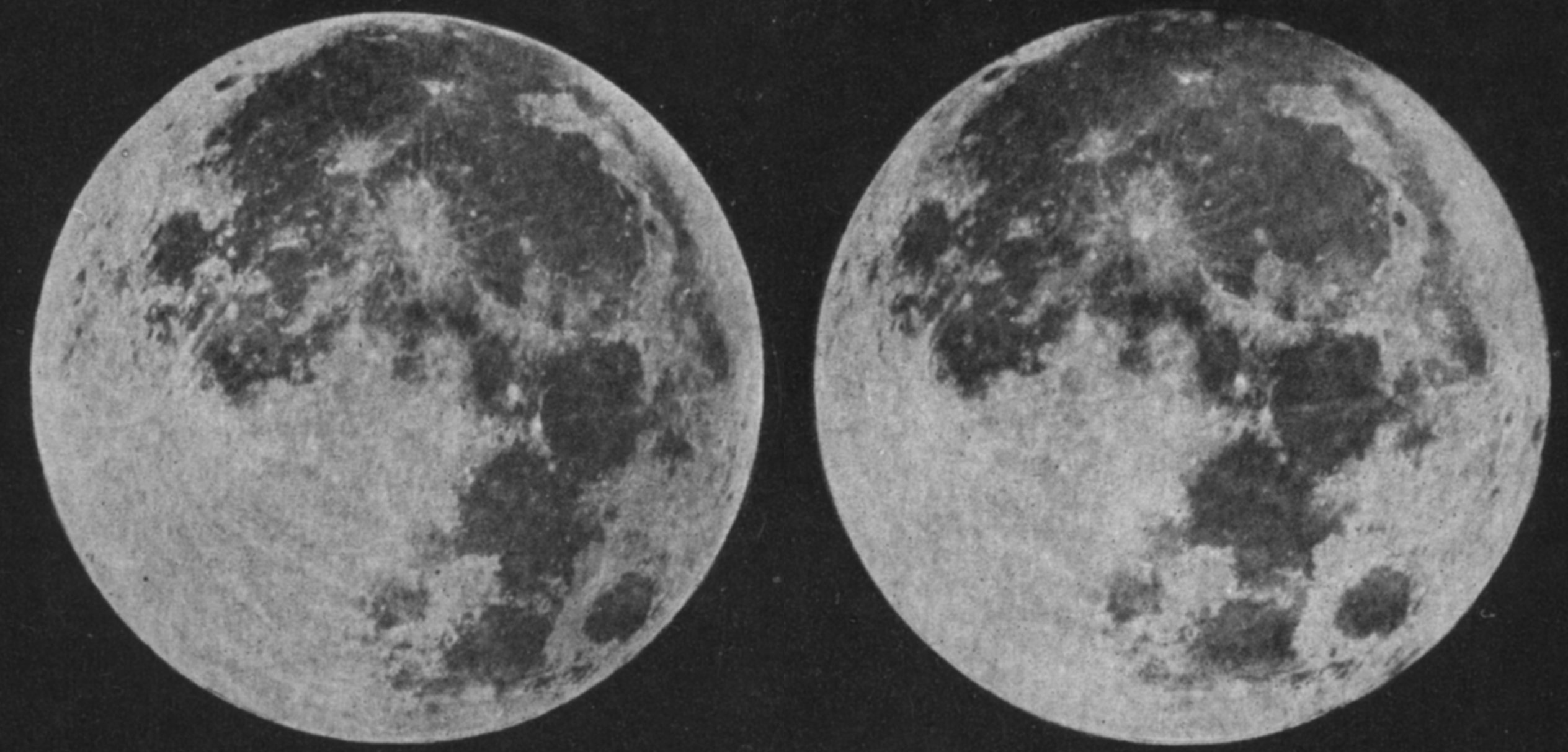

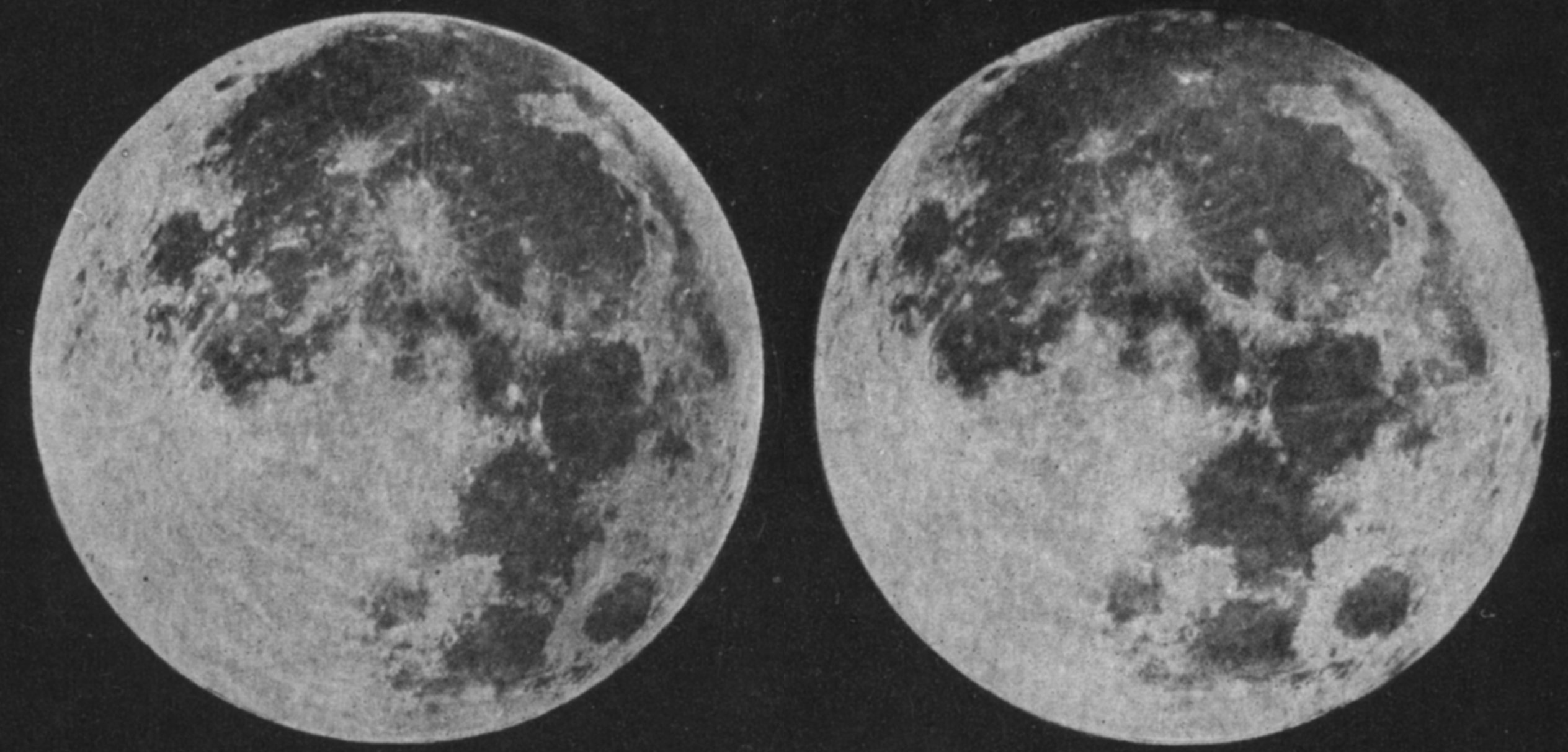
- Moon stereo from 1897 taken using libration.

If a stereo picture is taken of a large, distant object such as a mountain or a large building using a normal base it will appear to be flat. This is in keeping with normal human vision - it would look flat if one were actually there; but if the object looks flat, there doesn't seem to be any point in taking a stereo picture, as it will simply seem to be behind a stereo window, with no depth in the scene itself, much like looking at a flat photograph from a distance.

One way of dealing with this situation is to include a foreground object to add depth interest and enhance the feeling of "being there", and this is the advice commonly given to novice stereographers. Caution must be used, however, to ensure that the foreground object is not too prominent, and appears to be a natural part of the scene, otherwise it will seem to become the subject with the distant object being merely the background. In cases like this, if the picture is just one of a series with other pictures showing more dramatic depth, it might make sense just to leave it flat, but behind a window.

For making stereo images featuring only a distant object (e.g., a mountain with foothills), the camera positions can be separated by a larger distance (called the "interaxial" or stereo base, often mistakenly called "interocular") than the adult human norm of 62–65mm. This will effectively render the captured image as though it was seen by a giant, and thus will enhance the depth perception of these distant objects, and reduce the apparent scale of the scene proportionately. However, in this case, care must be taken not to bring objects in the close foreground too close to the viewer, as they will show excessive parallax and can complicate stereo window adjustment.

There are two main ways to accomplish this. One is to use two cameras separated by the required distance, the other is to shift a single camera the required distance between shots.

The shift method has been used with cameras such as the Stereo Realist to take hypers, either by taking two pairs and selecting the best frames, or by alternately capping each lens and recocking the shutter.

It is also possible to take hyperstereo pictures using an ordinary single lens camera from an airplane. One must be careful, however, about movement of clouds between shots.

It has even been suggested that a version of hyperstereo could be used to help pilots fly planes.

In such situations, where an ortho stereo viewing method is used, a common rule of thumb is the 1:30 rule. This means that the baseline will be equal to 1/30 of the distance to the nearest object included in the photograph.

The results of hyperstereo can be quite impressive, and examples of hyperstereo can be found in vintage views.

This technique can be applied to 3D imaging of the Moon: one picture is taken at moonrise, the other at moonset, as the face of the Moon is centered towards the Center of the Earth and the diurnal rotation carries the photographer around the perimeter, though the results are rather poor, and much better results can be obtained using alternative techniques.

This is why high quality published stereos of the moon are done using libration, the slight "wobbling" of the moon on its axis relative to the earth. Similar techniques were used late in the 19th century to take stereo views of Mars and other astronomical subjects.

==== Limitations of hyperstereo ====
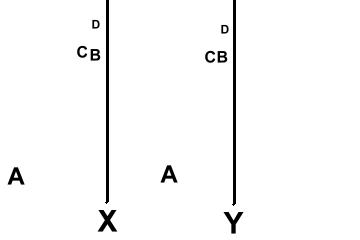
Illustration of parallax multiplication limits with A at 30 and 2000 feet

Vertical alignment can become a big problem, especially if the terrain on which the two camera positions are placed is uneven.

Movement of objects in the scene can make syncing two widely separated cameras a nightmare. When a single camera is moved between two positions even subtle movements such as plants blowing in the wind and the movement of clouds can become a problem. The wider the baseline, the more of a problem this becomes.

Pictures taken in this fashion take on the appearance of a miniature model, taken from a short distance, and those not familiar with such pictures often cannot be convinced that it is the real object. This is because we cannot see depth when looking at such scenes in real life and our brains aren't equipped to deal with the artificial depth created by such techniques, and so our minds tell us it must be a smaller object viewed from a short distance, which would have depth. Though most do eventually realize that it is, indeed, an image of a large object from far away, many find the effect bothersome. This doesn't rule out using such techniques, but it is one of the factors that need to be considered when deciding whether or not such a technique should be used.

In movies and other forms of "3D" entertainment, hyperstereo may be used to simulate the viewpoint of a giant, with eyes a hundred feet apart. The miniaturization would be just what the photographer (or designer in the case of drawings/computer-generated images) had in mind. On the other hand, in the case of a massive ship flying through space the impression that it is a miniature model is probably not what the filmmakers intended.

Hyper stereo can also lead to cardboarding, an effect that creates stereos in which different objects seem well separated in depth, but the objects themselves seem flat. This is because parallax appears quantized.

Illustration of the limits of parallax multiplication, refer to image at right. Ortho viewing method assumed. The line represents the Z axis, so imagine that it is laying flat and stretching into the distance. If the camera is at X point A is on an object at 30 feet. Point B is on an object at 200 feet and point C is on the same object but 1 inch behind B. Point D is on an object 250 feet away. With a normal baseline point A is clearly in the foreground, with B, C, and D all at stereo infinity. With a one-foot base line, which multiplies the parallax, there will be enough parallax to separate all four points, though the depth in the object containing B and C will still be subtle. If this object is the main subject, we may consider a baseline of 6 feet 8 inches but then the object at A would need to be cropped out. Now imagine that the camera is point Y, now the object at A is at 2,000 feet, point B is on an object at 2,170 feet C is a point on the same object 1 inch behind B. Point D is on an object at 2,220 feet. With a normal baseline, all four points are now at stereo infinity. With a 67-foot baseline, the multiplied parallax allows us to see that all three objects are on different planes, yet points B and C, on the same object, appear to be on the same plane and all three objects appear flat. This is because the parallax is insufficient to see depth within the object, so at 2,170 feet the parallax between B and C is close to zero and imperceptible.

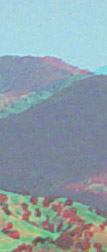
Small anaglyphed image 3D red cyan glasses are recommended to view this image correctly.

==== A practical example ====
In the red-cyan anaglyph example to the right, a ten-meter baseline atop the roof ridge of a house was used to image the mountain. The two foothill ridges are about four miles (6.4 km) distant and are separated in depth from each other and the background. The baseline is still too short to resolve the depth of the two more distant major peaks from each other. Owing to various trees that appeared in only one of the images the final image had to be severely cropped at each side and the bottom.

In the wider image below, taken from a different location, a single camera was walked about one hundred feet (30 m) between pictures. The images were converted to monochrome before combination.

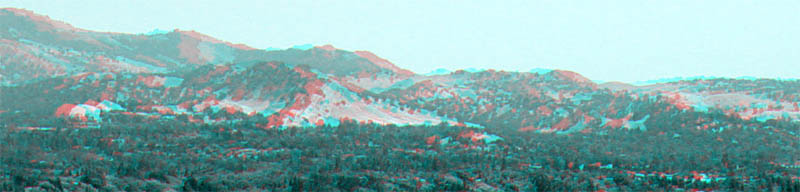
Long base line image showing prominent foothill ridges; click the image for more information on the technique 3D red cyan glasses are recommended to view this image correctly.

=== The PEPAX principle – "telephoto stereo" ===
Pepax, thought to be an amalgamation of PErspective and PArallaX, involves the use of a wider than normal baseline, but for a different purpose. Unlike hyperstereo, pepax does not try to exaggerate depth beyond normal vision, instead it tries to restore the depth and size of objects that would be seen at a shorter distance to the subject. The idea is to adjust the stereo base (parallax) in proportion to the zoom (perspective).

If a picture is taken with a stereo camera (or pair of cameras) and a 4X telephoto lens or 4X zoom built into the camera(s) is used, objects will be the size they would be at 1/4 the distance, but will have no where near the depth, which is why zoom is generally frowned upon in stereo photography. If, however, the base is also multiplied by four the normal depth is restored and the image looks normal.

Because the size of objects is increased in proportion to the enhanced depth, there is no miniaturization effect as with hyperstereo, but the same telephoto compression seen in extreme zoom flat photographs also occurs. Specifically, there is a reduction in the relative sizes of objects at different distances so that objects that are further away appear to be larger than closer objects that are actually the same size. Note that this effect is negligible at lower zoom levels and most observers cannot distinguish between telephoto pictures taken with wide base and normal pictures taken with a normal base at an equivalent distance. So pictures taken at 40 feet with a 4x zoom and a 10-inch base will appear similar to pictures taken at 10 feet with no zoom and a 2.5-inch base.

Note that when using this technique it is necessary to avoid objects that are significantly closer or more distant than the main subject so as to avoid excessive deviation that could cause the image to be uncomfortable or even impossible to view.

=== Shorter baseline for ultra closeups – "Macro stereo" ===
Stereo image
Left frame
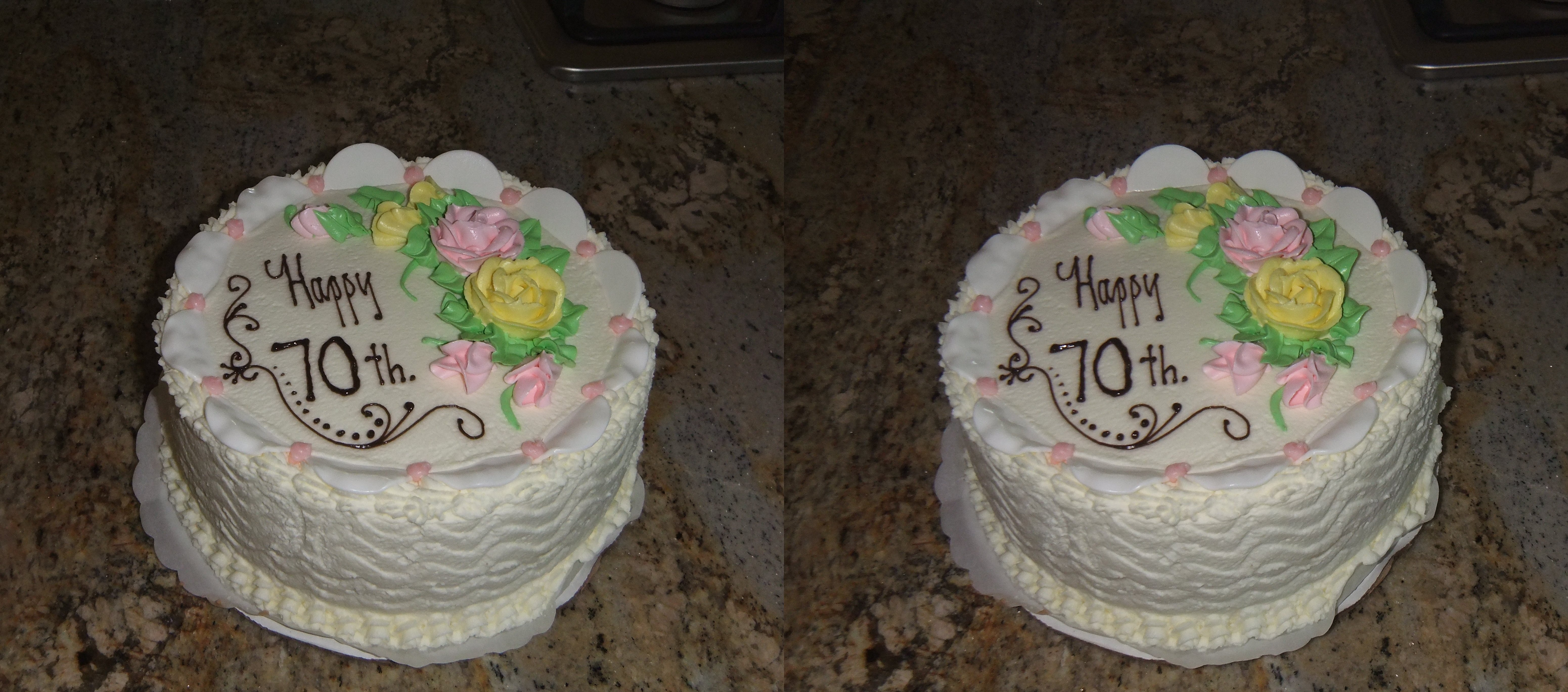
Right frame
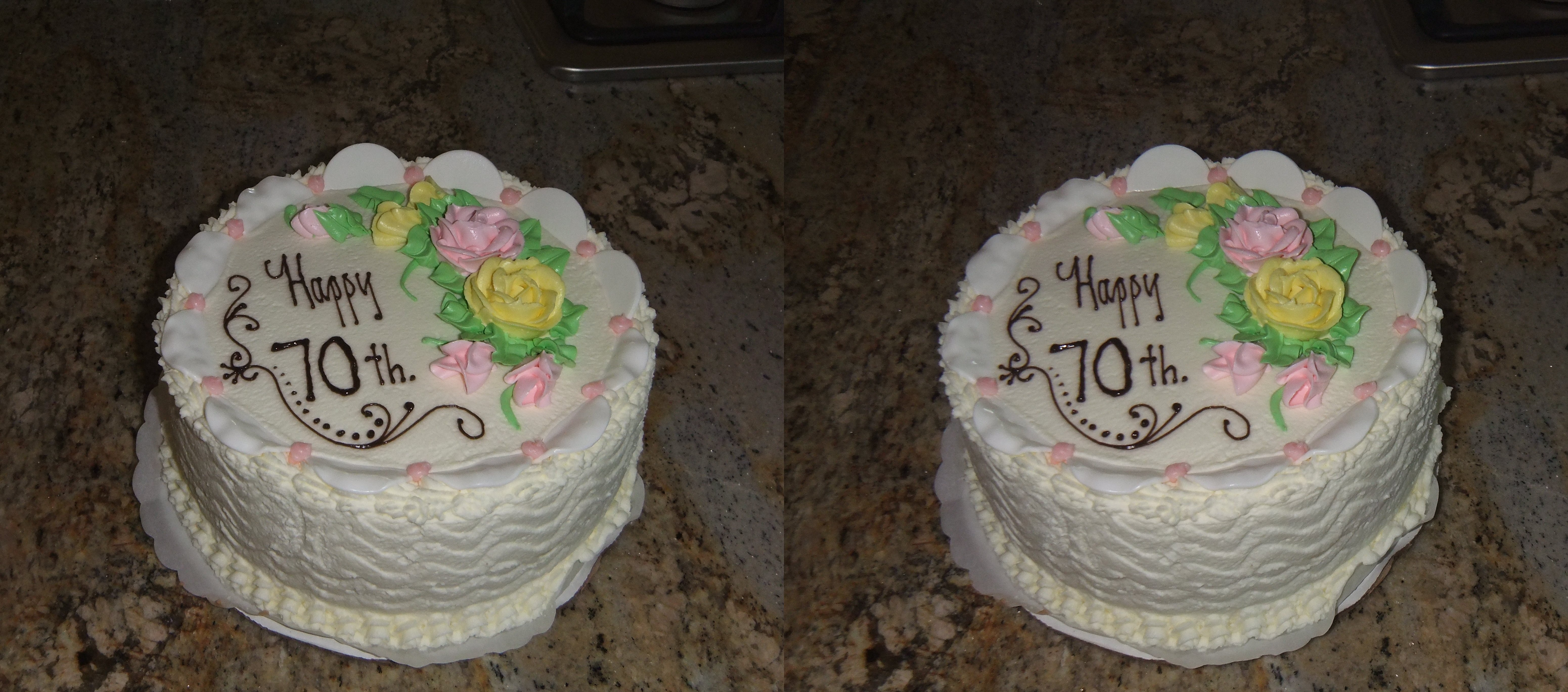
Parallel view
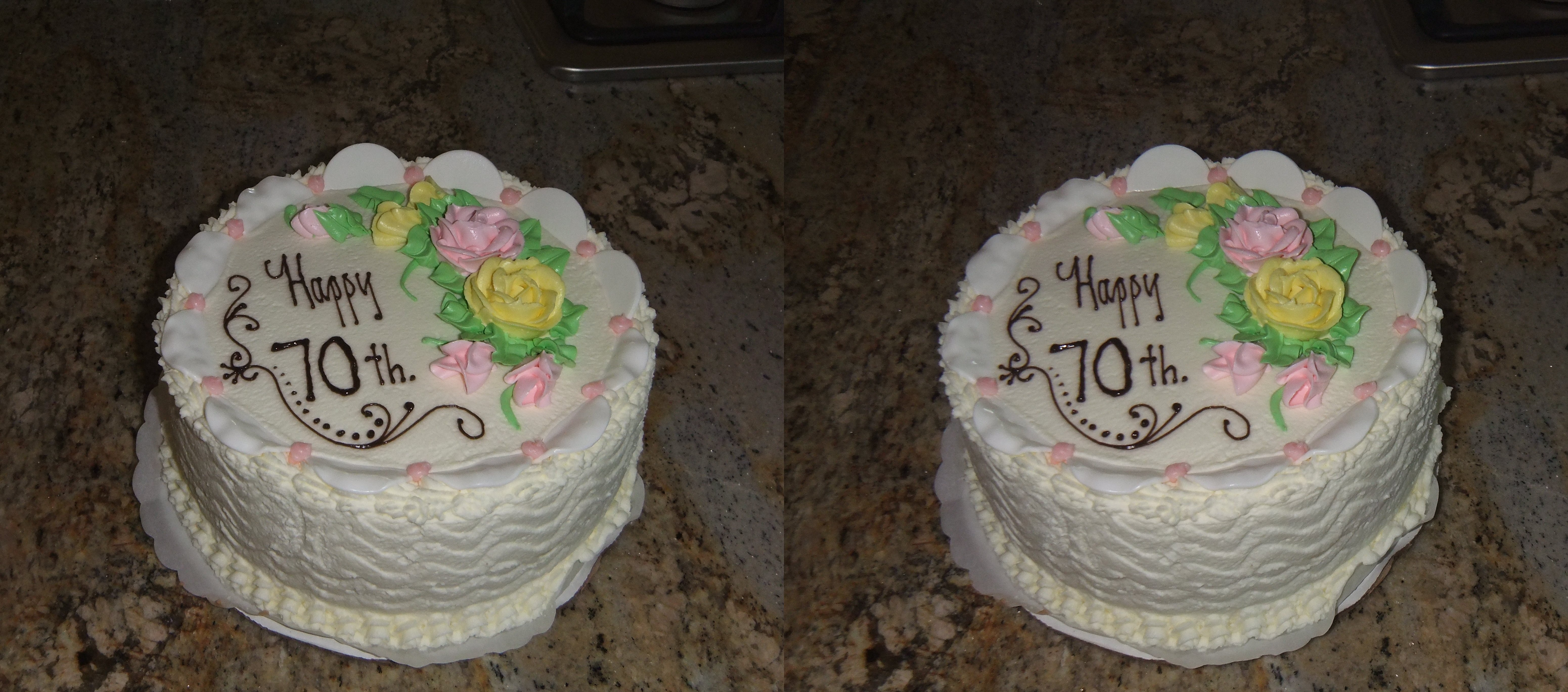
Cross-eye view
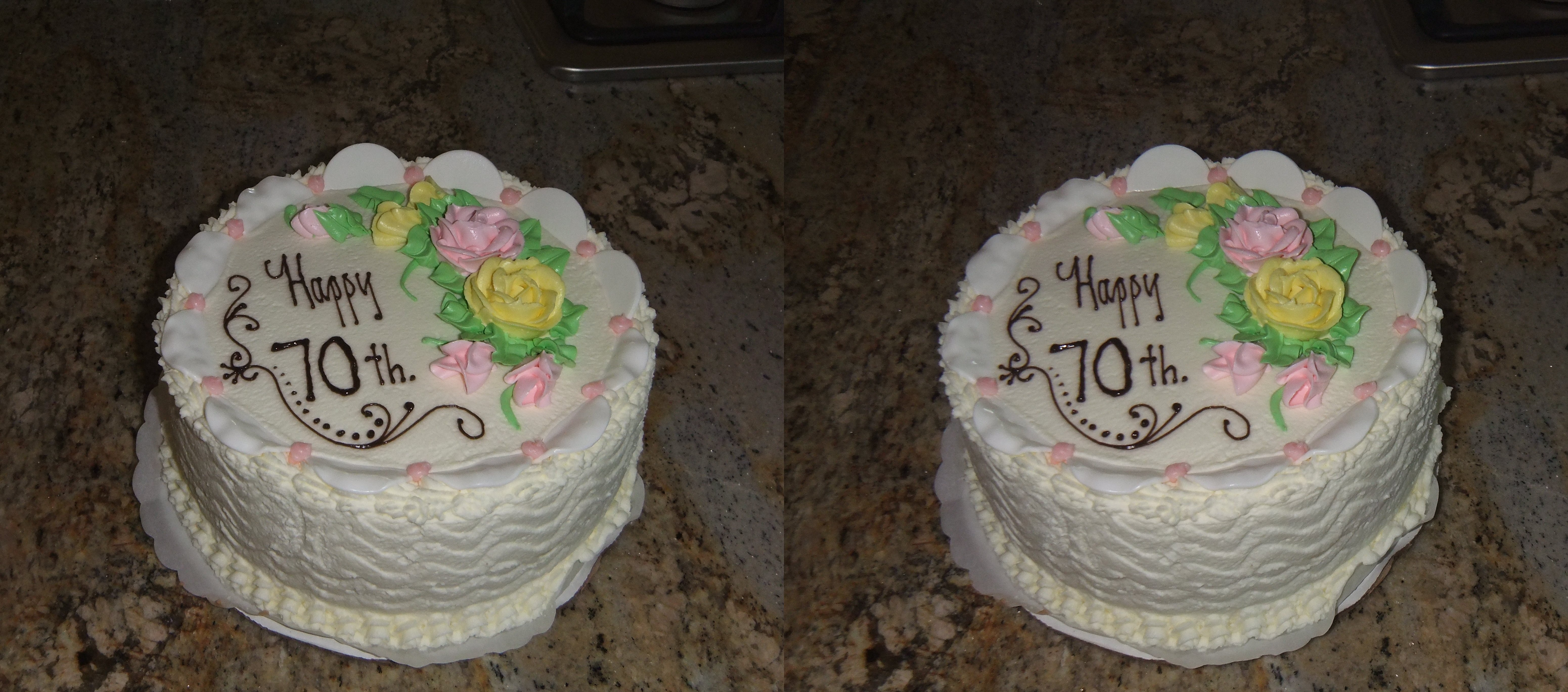

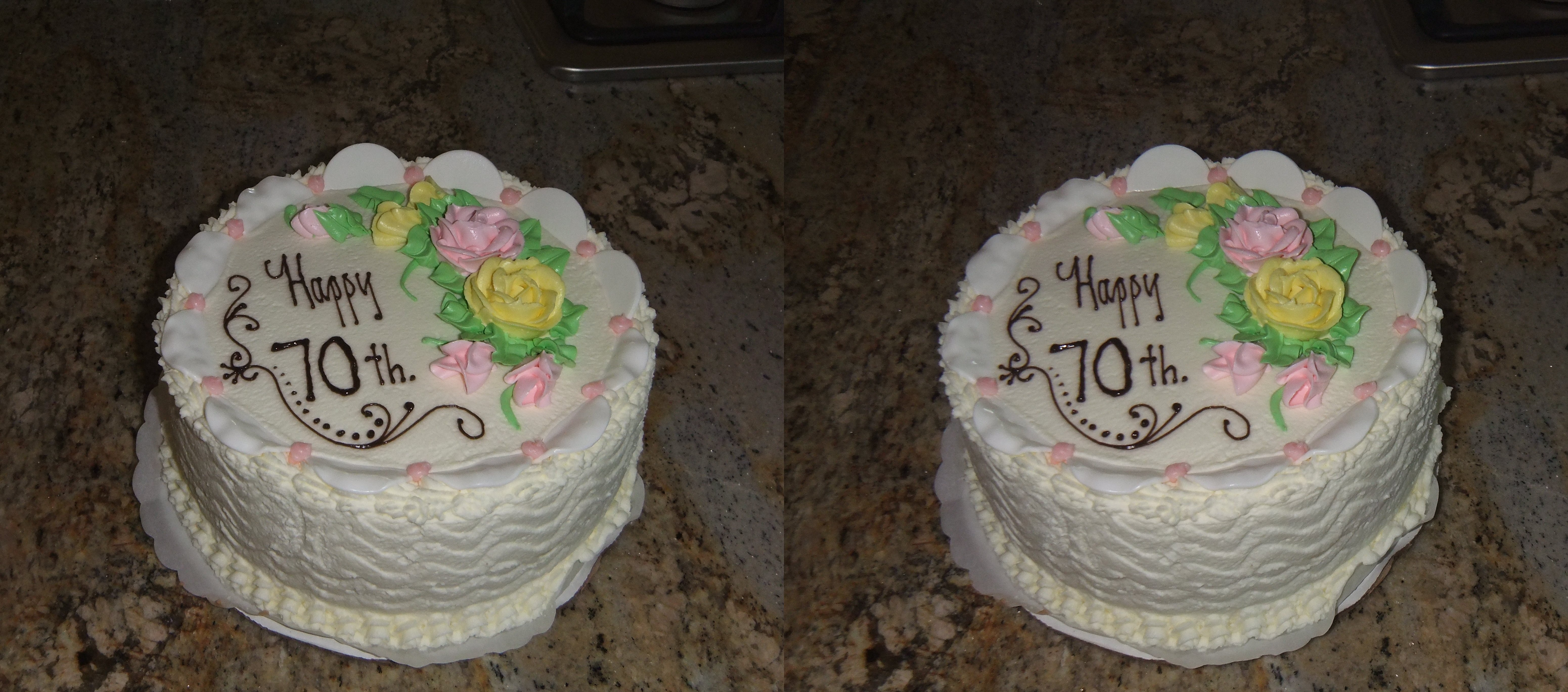
- Closeup stereo of a cake photographed using a Fuji W3. Taken by backing off several feet and then zooming in.

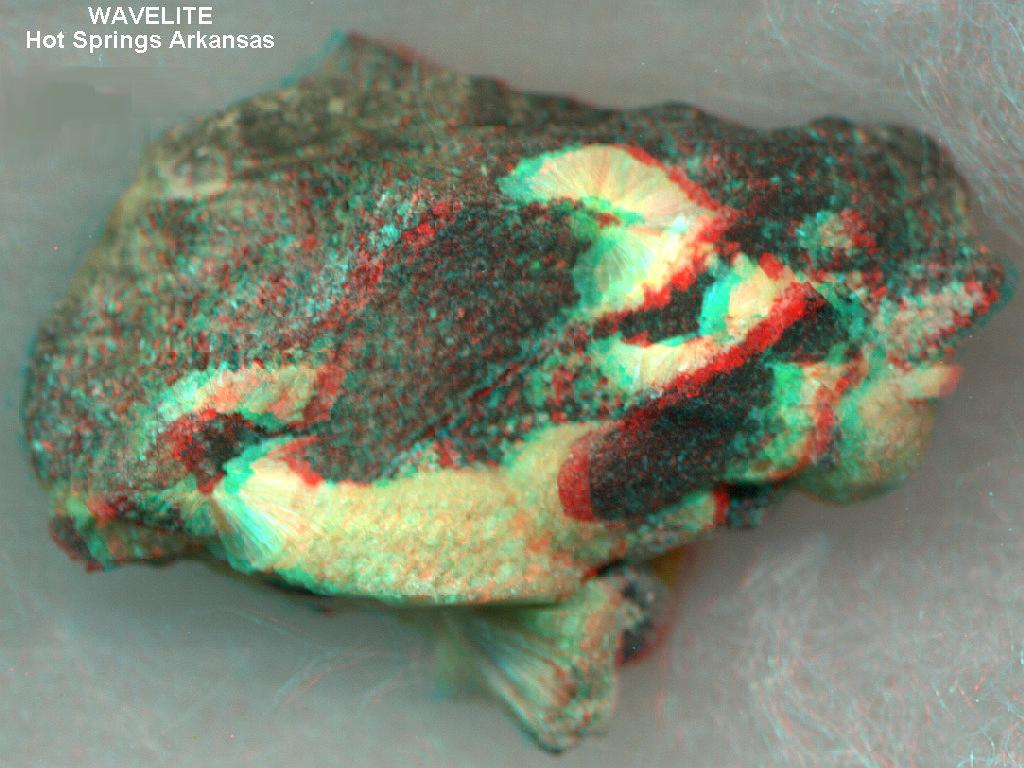
A mineral specimen imaged with scanner. Anaglyph, red left.

When objects are taken from closer than about 6 1/2 feet a normal base will produce excessive parallax and thus exaggerated depth when using ortho viewing methods. At some point the parallax becomes so great that the image is difficult or even impossible to view. For such situations, it becomes necessary to reduce the baseline in keeping with the 1:30 rule.

When still life scenes are stereographed, an ordinary single lens camera can be moved using a slide bar or similar method to generate a stereo pair. Multiple views can be taken and the best pair selected for the desired viewing method.

For moving objects, a more sophisticated approach is used. In the early 1970s, Realist incorporated introduced the Macro Realist designed to stereograph subjects 4 to 5 1/2 inches away, for viewing in Realist format viewers and projectors. It featured a 15mm base and fixed focus. It was invented by Clarence G. Henning.

In recent years cameras have been produced which are designed to stereograph subjects 10" to 20" using print film, with a 27mm baseline. Another technique, usable with fixed base cameras such as the Fujifilm FinePix Real 3D W1/W3 is to back off from the subject and use the zoom function to zoom to a closer view, such as was done in the image of a cake. This has the effect of reducing the effective baseline. Similar techniques could be used with paired digital cameras.

Another way to take images of very small objects, "extreme macro", is to use an ordinary flatbed scanner. This is a variation on the shift technique in which the object is turned upside down and placed on the scanner, scanned, moved over and scanned again. This produces stereos of a range objects as large as about 6" across down to objects as small as a carrot seed. This technique goes back to at least 1995. See the article Scanography for more details.

In stereo drawings and computer-generated stereo images a smaller-than-normal baseline may be built into the constructed images to simulate a "bug's eye" view of the scene.

=== Baseline tailored to viewing method ===
When images are viewed on a small screen from a short distance, differences in parallax are smaller and the stereo effect is muted. For this reason, stereo images are sometimes "optimized" for this situation, by using a larger baseline.

However, images optimized for a small screen viewed from a short distance will show excessive parallax when viewed with more ortho methods, such as a projected image or a head-mounted display, possibly causing eyestrain and headaches, or doubling, so pictures optimized for this viewing method may not be usable with other methods.

When images are intended for anaglyph display a muted stereo effect generated by a smaller baseline will help to minimize "ghosting" artifacts.

=== Variable base for "geometric stereo" ===
As mentioned previously, the goal of the photographer may be a reason for using a baseline that is larger than normal. Such is the case when, instead of trying to achieve a close emulation to natural vision, a stereographer may be trying to achieve geometric perfection. This approach means that objects are shown with the shape they actually have, rather than the way they are seen by humans.

Objects at 25 to 30 feet, instead of having the subtle depth that one being there would see, or what would be recorded with a normal baseline, will have the much more dramatic depth that would be seen from 7 to 10 feet. So instead of seeing objects as one would with eyes 2 1/2" apart, they would be seen as they would appear if one's eyes were 12" apart. In other words, the baseline is chosen to produce the same depth effect, regardless of the distance from the subject. As with true ortho, this effect is impossible to achieve in a literal sense, since different objects in the scene will be at different distances and will thus show different amounts of parallax, but the geometric stereographer, like the ortho stereographer attempts to come as close as possible.

Achieving this could be as simple as using the 1:30 rule to find a custom base for every shot, regardless of distance, or it could involve using a more complicated formula.

This could be thought of as a form of hyperstereo, but less extreme. As a result, it has all of the same limitations of hyperstereo. When objects are given enhanced depth, but not magnified to take up a larger portion of the view, there is a certain miniaturization effect. Of course, this may be exactly what the stereographer has in mind.

While geometric stereo neither attempts nor achieves a close emulation of natural vision, there are valid reasons for this approach. It does, however, represent a specialized branch of stereography.

==== Precise stereoscopic baseline calculation methods ====
Recent research has led to precise methods for calculating the stereoscopic camera baseline. These techniques consider the geometry of the display/viewer and scene/camera spaces independently and can be used to reliably calculate a mapping of the scene depth being captured to a comfortable display depth budget. This frees up the photographer to place their camera wherever they wish to achieve the desired composition and then use the baseline calculator to work out the camera inter-axial separation required to produce the desired effect.

This approach means there is no guesswork in the stereoscopic setup once a small set of parameters have been measured, it can be implemented for photography and computer graphics and the methods can be easily implemented in a software tool.

==== Multi-rig stereoscopic cameras ====
The precise methods for camera control have also allowed the development of multi-rig stereoscopic cameras where different slices of scene depth are captured using different inter-axial settings, the images of the slices are then collected together to form the final stereoscopic image pair. This allows important regions of a scene to be given better stereoscopic representation while less important regions are assigned less of the depth budget. It provides stereographers with a way to manage composition within the limited depth budget of each individual display technology.
