= 4 Years, 6 Months, 2 Days =

- One Tree Hill episode
- Haley and Jamie in the season five premiere
- Episode no.: Season 5 Episode 1
- Directed by: Greg Prange
- Written by: Mark Schwahn
- Production code: 3T6801
- Original air date: January 8, 2008

Guest appearances
- Michaela McManus as Lindsey Strauss; Johann Urb as Nick; Daphne Zuniga as Victoria Davis; Cullen Moss as Junk; Vaughn Wilson as Fergie; Lisa Goldstein as Millicent Huxtable; Dikran Tulaine as John Knight; Rand Courtney; William Day; Karen Ceesay as Receptionist; Jason Giuliano; Justin Tully; Victor Turner

Episode chronology
← Previous "All of a Sudden I Miss Everyone"	Next → "Racing Like a Pro"
- One Tree Hill season 5

"4 Years, 6 Months, 2 Days" is the first episode of the fifth season of the television series One Tree Hill and the eighty-ninth episode of the series. The episode premiered on the CW on January 8, 2008. It became the first One Tree Hill episode that had been ordered for mid-season. The episode aired at 8/7C, with the second episode, "Racing Like a Pro", airing immediately after. The season's timeslot was then moved to 9/8C.

It re-introduced the characters after college, and the characters returned to the fictional town of Tree Hill.

"4 Years, 6 Months, 2 Days" was written by Mark Schwahn, the series creator. It was also directed by Greg Prange, who commonly directed the episodes that Schwahn wrote. The episode was released on iTunes and Amazon Unbox as a free download in the US; however, it later cost $1.99.

The episode included music from Kelly Clarkson, Jackson Waters, the National, Yellowcard, and Black Rebel Motorcycle Club.

== Plot ==
The episode is set four years after the events of the fourth season finale "All of a Sudden I Miss Everyone".

Lucas Scott (Chad Michael Murray) returns to Tree Hill after having been away at college. Nathan Scott (James Lafferty) is paralyzed and bitter after his dreams of playing professional basketball were crushed in a bar fight. Haley James Scott (Bethany Joy Galeotti), now a teacher, raises her son Jamie (Jackson Brundage), while her husband Nathan struggles with his problems. Peyton Sawyer (Hilarie Burton) quits her job as assistant to the assistant at a label and returns to Tree Hill. Brooke Davis (Sophia Bush) a well-known fashion designer is struggling to get along with her bossy CEO Victoria (Daphne Zuniga). Victoria tells the limo driver to drop Brooke's date Nick (Johann Urb) off as soon as they have been photographed together. She then realises that she has to return to Tree Hill to help Peyton. Upon her return to Tree Hill, Peyton meets Lucas' girlfriend Lindsey (Michaela McManus). Mouth (Lee Norris) struggles to get a job as a sports announcer, and Lucas is made the new coach of the Ravens, with Skills (Antwon Tanner) as assistant coach.

== Production ==
On May 20, 2007, The CW announced that the show would return for a fifth season, but as a mid-season replacement. The show will be "dramatically retooled and set four years into the future - after the characters have already graduated from college." Until the show's return to the schedule, the network has plans to post diaries online to fill in the intervening years in the characters' lives. The fifth season began shooting on July 29, 2007.

"We've seen the High School dramas not do so well while they're in college, and another thing, we've done everything that everyone does in college".
— Hilarie Burton

Hilarie Burton (who plays Peyton Sawyer) confirmed on TRL that the show's fifth season will focus on their lives after college. She said this will "enable them to do flashbacks and a lot of cool stuff with the characters".

On November 6, 2007, The CW posted the first One Tree Hill online diary, a series of six segments to be released before the start of the new season. One Tree Hill: Fast Forward allows fans of the show to catch a glimpse of the lives of the six main characters at the beginning of the fifth season. The first Fast Forward diary features Sophia Bush's character, Brooke Davis. The webisodes continued in a boy, girl order, until the fifth that featured Haley James Scott (Bethany Joy Galeotti) and Nathan Scott (James Lafferty) The sixth webisode featured the new guest cast for the fifth season.

"It's one thing to talk about having dreams in high school, we all do. It's another thing to pursue those dreams, or find that it's not going to be as easy as you thought it was, but there's some voice inside you that compels you to try harder, compels you to keep pushing. The show has always been about what you want, what you're willing to do to get it and what's right and wrong about the pursuit".
— Mark Schwahn, creator and executive producer

Mark Schwahn the creator, and executive producer of One Tree Hill, has stated that season five will be about the characters pursuing their dreams, finding out that it might not be easy, but they will keep pushing.

Joe Davola, an executive producer tells us, "we looked at this year, we looked at episode one and said it is a pilot. He feels that all the rules have changed. The former teen casts looks have changed and they've brought in new characters to work within the fabric of the show."

In the last fast forward episode, Mark Schwan tells us that he thinks "jumping ahead, allows [them] to do all sorts of things."

== Reception ==
On the episodes initial airing, the episode received 3.36 million viewers. It gained a 2.3 rating and a share of 4. The episode received a 1.5/4 rating/share in viewers aged between 18 and 49. It ranked 80/95 for the week and 12/13 for the night. Don Williams of BuddyTV liked the addition of Jamie Scott, however felt that the show was missing the adult characters.
