= One Tree Hill season 2 =

One Tree Hill
- Season 2
- One Tree Hill Season 2 DVD cover
- No. of episodes: 23

Release
- Original network: The WB
- Original release: September 21, 2004 – May 24, 2005

Season chronology
- ← Previous; Season 1 Next → Season 3

The second season of One Tree Hill, an American teen drama television series, began airing on September 21, 2004, on The WB television network. The season concluded on May 24, 2005, after 23 episodes.

Season two increased in ratings, averaging 4.34 million viewers and ranking at No. 129 with a 1.9 rating, and was the highest rated season.

Warner Home Video released the complete second season, under the title of One Tree Hill: The Complete Second Season, on September 13, 2005, as a six-disc boxed set.

== Cast and characters ==
=== Main ===
- Chad Michael Murray as Lucas Scott
- James Lafferty as Nathan Scott
- Hilarie Burton as Peyton Sawyer
- Bethany Joy Lenz as Haley James Scott
- Paul Johansson as Dan Scott
- Sophia Bush as Brooke Davis
- Barbara Alyn Woods as Deb Scott
- Barry Corbin as Whitey Durham
- Craig Sheffer as Keith Scott
- Moira Kelly as Karen Roe

=== Recurring ===
- Tyler Hilton as Chris Keller
- Kieren Hutchison as Andy Hargrove
- Lee Norris as Mouth McFadden
- Daniella Alonso as Anna Taggaro
- Michael Copon as Felix Taggaro
- Bryan Greenberg as Jake Jagielski
- Maria Menounos as Jules Chambers
- Brett Claywell as Tim Smith
- Vaughn Wilson as Fergie Thompson
- Katherine Bailess as Erica Marsh
- Antwon Tanner as Skills Taylor
- Bevin Prince as Bevin Mirskey
- Cullen Moss as Junk Moretti
- Lindsey McKeon as Taylor James
- Emmanuelle Vaugier as Nicki
- Shawn Shepard as Principal Turner
- Bess Armstrong as Lydia James
- Sarah Edwards as Theresa
- Michael Trucco as Cooper Lee

=== Special guest star ===
- Huey Lewis as Jim James
- The Wreckers as Themselves
- Jimmy Eat World as Themselves

== Episodes ==
No. overall	No. in season	Title	Directed by	Written by	Original release date	Prod. code	U.S. viewers (millions)
23	1	"The Desperate Kingdom of Love"	Greg Prange	Mark Schwahn	September 21, 2004	2T5251	4.93
Deb hesitated to call an ambulance for Dan after he threatened her, but does so nonetheless and wonders if she caused any damage with the slight delay. In flashback Nathan and Haley get Haley's parents permission to get married and wed on the beach. Deb is furious at them for their marriage and Karen is worried it won't last. Brooke and Peyton spend the day together and become friends again, while promising to take a break from guys. They burn Lucas’ goodbye letter without reading it. Lucas and Keith debate whether to go home or not. There are more reasons to stay put but Lucas opts to for Nathan and Keith pushes through his fear of Dan to be there for his brother. Whitey is told he has a tumor behind his eye and has to have surgery. Haley moves in with Nathan but is terrified that they have little in common. He promises it will work. Lucas comes back home. Dan wakes up in hospital to see Keith and Deb hugging. This episode is named after a song by PJ Harvey.
24	2	"Truth Doesn't Make a Noise"	Billy Dickson	Mark B. Perry	September 28, 2004	2T5252	4.93
With help from Peyton and Brooke, Lucas throws Nathan and Haley a wedding party. Nathan and Lucas continue to become better friends. Although Haley's parents support the marriage, Deb is incredibly rude to Haley. Dan's recent heart attack inspires him to try and mend his relationships, something the doctors call the Phoenix Effect. Dan asks to see Lucas but Nathan advises him not to. Brooke makes Peyton an online dating profile but she doesn't want one. Deb decides to attend the wedding party and claims Haley is ruining her son's life. Haley ends up asking her to leave after she is rude to her parents. Skills advises Lucas to just be the old version of himself that everyone loved instead of trying to be a new person. Brooke and Peyton admit to Lucas they never read the letter, and he says it's fine and that he's determined for the three of them to be friends again. Lucas gives a toast dedicated to his half-brother and now sister-in-law. Karen decides to take classes at a nearby college. Whitey refuses surgery. Keith decides to stay in town and run Dan's shop while he is recovering. Peyton deletes the dating profile. Deb laments to Dan that Nathan has a 'new family' with Haley and doesn't love his parents, but Dan promises they’ll fix their family together. Lucas visits Dan. This episode is named after a song by The White Stripes.
25	3	"Near Wild Heaven"	Greg Prange	James Stoteraux & Chad Fiveash	October 5, 2004	2T5253	5.43
Although Nathan and Haley are already married, Tim insists on throwing Nathan a post-wedding bachelor party, while Brooke and Peyton throw Haley a wild bachelorette party. Dan asks Lucas if they can start to build a relationship together and has him find the pictures in the safe. At the bachelor party, Nathan resists doing anything with the stripper, realizing all he wants is Haley. The bachelorette party ends when Brooke's credit cards are declined. Keith offers Lucas a job working at the dealership, but he instead offers it to Nathan and promises to take over the cafe somewhat as Karen has decided to take business studies at college. Brooke's (parent's credit card) bank account tells her there are 'insufficient funds'. Dan and Deb bet on Nathan and Haley's marriage failing as school and financial pressures hit them. Nathan takes the job with Keith. Lucas tells Dan the pictures don't change anything, but Dan says he hopes to change their future. This episode is named after a song by R.E.M.
26	4	"You Can't Always Get What You Want"	Joanna Kerns	Jennifer Cecil	October 12, 2004	2T5254	4.83
Lucas tells Nathan that he wants to get to know Dan and spend time together. He notices Dan is quick to have mood swings but Dan offers Lucas a drive in his new sports car and Lucas accepts. Haley and Nathan struggle with money when Haley wants Nathan to buy a car to get to work, but instead he buys her a piano. Karen starts college and her new teacher, Andy, likes her ideas and singles her out. Karen and Deb decide to start a bar. Brooke mistakes her new neighbor, Felix, for a pool boy with no English. Felix later challenges Lucas to a car race while the latter is driving the new car with Dan. Brooke learns that her family is broke. Peyton wants to start a club for her under-21 friends and the manager for a popular band invites her to snort speed (or coke) to 'seal the deal'. Nathan and Keith work on fixing a car together. Karen asks Peyton to run an all ages night (primarily for under-21s) at her new bar and club. Andy approaches Karen outside class and flirts with her. Felix saves Brooke from arrest while shop-lifting and they flirt as Felix predicted ('we fight, we flirt') with Brooke possibly warming up to him. Dan offers the car to Lucas but Lucas refuses as he sees it as being bought. This episode is named after a song by The Rolling Stones.
27	5	"I Will Dare"	Thomas J. Wright	Mark Schwahn	October 19, 2004	2T5255	4.50
Felix organizes a "dare night" to test the limits of his new classmates. While out playing the game, Lucas has to return clothes to a store whilst wearing them. An unknown girl helps him out when security come to get him: it is Anna, who joins in further dares. Peyton is dared to confess in church with something rude, but in the confessional she admits this is the first time she's been in church since her mother died. Tearfully she admits that she recently tried cocaine and hopes her mother didn't see. Keith is caught off guard when a beautiful woman, Jules, comes to the dealership and begins flirting with him. Meanwhile, Karen goes on a date with Andy, her teacher. Brooke gets angry with Felix when he dares her to 'dine and dash' without paying the bill. Lucas takes a liking to Anna, who is revealed to be Felix's sister. This episode is named after a song by The Replacements.
28	6	"We Might as Well Be Strangers"	Sandy Bookstaver	Terrence Coli	October 26, 2004	2T5256	4.57
A midnight meteor shower finds Lucas sharing a romantic night with Anna, Andy surprising Karen with a dinner and Keith cooking for Jules on their first date. Nathan is given the opportunity to go to a prestigious basketball camp all summer in Florida but declines so Haley can focus on her music. Brooke forms a friends with benefits relationship with Felix, and Peyton sets out to find an opening act for her club where she meets the cocky indie artist Chris Keller. Dan wants to mend fences with Deb, but she keeps her boundaries as she thinks he's doing better. When the doctor calls Dan and tells him his health is good, he lies to Deb and tells her she's going to have to stick around and help him. The boys pressure Whitey to get surgery but he's scared he’ll die. Anna doesn't want Lucas to tell Felix about them but he ends up catching them kissing. Whitey goes in for his surgery. When Brooke's family begins selling all of her prized possessions, she only wants to throw herself at Felix more. Ultimately, Mouth buys her a prized dollhouse back. It is revealed Dan forced the recruiter to offer Nathan the spot in an attempt to break him and Haley up. This episode is named after a song by Keane.
29	7	"Let the Reigns Go Loose"	David Paymer	R. Lee Fleming, Jr.	November 2, 2004	2T5257	4.62
The opening of Peyton and Karen's club "TRIC" brings together the people of Tree Hill. Lucas and Felix come to blows over Anna. After Chris quits the night of the club opening, Haley must face her fear of performing to save the night for Peyton and receives rave reviews. Andy meets Lucas and is surprised he's older and Karen is older than he thought. Felix tells Anna she's the reason they had to leave their old life due to rumors surrounding her. Mouth tends to Brooke while she is drunk, but Felix sneaks in and attempts to take the credit. Keith and Jules realize their relationship has reached a new level and Dan tells Karen that Deb slept with Keith. Nathan begins to feel jealous of Haley and Chris. When Karen asks Deb about it she lies and says it's not true. Haley learns Peyton did drugs. Felix threatens Lucas to stay away. This episode is named after a song by The Get Up Kids.
30	8	"Truth, Bitter Truth"	Billy Dickson	Stacy Rukeyser	November 9, 2004	2T5258	4.54
When Karen learns that there were drugs in the club, she kicks out the band who says her club will pay. Brooke and Felix continue their friends with benefits arrangement. Haley records a song with Chris and lies to Nathan about it. Haley, Peyton, and Brooke throw a slumber party and invite Anna. The girls catch Brooke and Felix in Haley's bed. At the party, all is revealed when Haley and Brooke share each other's secrets including how Peyton did a line of coke and that Haley is lying to Nathan. The girls make up and encourage Brooke to find love, not meaningless sex, while Peyton promises she won't do drugs. The girls take Anna in as part of their group. Meanwhile, Nathan and Lucas road trip to Charlotte for a Bobcats' basketball game and Lucas is surprised when Nathan says they have to test for HCM, a genetic heart condition that Dan has. Lucas ultimately backs out and doesn’t take the test. Keith and Jules grow closer and he gives her a key to his apartment. Karen and Andy have a fight when she suspects that he is giving her good grades because of their relationship but make up and sleep together. Nathan gets his test back and learns he doesn't have HCM but he and Lucas realize that means that Lucas could have it because there is a 50% chance of inheriting it. This episode is named after a song by Marianne Faithfull.
31	9	"The Trick Is to Keep Breathing"	John Asher	James Stoteraux & Chad Fiveash	November 16, 2004	2T5259	4.18
It's the school's formal night and Tree Hill is brought together. At the formal, emotions flare and relationships change. Dan lets Lucas know he's aware that he didn't take the HCM test. Deb tries to fix her relationship with Nathan, but it doesn't go well. Haley spends the night recording with Chris, causing her to miss out on the night Nathan had planned. She arrives just in time for her and Nathan to be crowned king and queen. The band plays her duet with Chris which upsets Nathan as she kept it from him. Brooke becomes jealous of Anna, while Anna reacts weirdly to Felix making a joke about her and Peyton being gay. Mouth tells Brooke the truth about how he took care of her, which angers her as she was lied to by both men. Peyton begins feeling alone and struggles with doing drugs she was given. After the formal, Anna tries to have sex with Lucas but he turns her down because he isn't in love with her. Brooke ends her and Felix's friend with benefits relationship. After Peyton's mother's dress is ruined, she is tempted to do drugs but resists. Lucas takes Brooke home and she tells him she misses being friends with him. Dan confesses the truth to Deb about his condition and prepares to leave but she stops him and lets him stay. Nathan asks Haley if she likes Chris and she storms off. This episode is named after a song by Garbage.
32	10	"Don't Take Me for Granted"	Lev L. Spiro	Mark Schwahn	November 30, 2004	2T5260	4.36
Nathan is concerned about Lucas's health, so he tells Karen that Lucas didn't take the heart test. Despite this, Lucas refuses to take the test. Dan offers Keith a job at the dealership, as vice-president. Felix starts a rumor that Peyton is a lesbian to take away the suspicion from Anna. Brooke finds her car window smashed and immediately blames Felix, but Mouth is the real culprit. At school, Peyton must confront the rumors that she is a lesbian, which affects her friendship with Anna who shuts her out completely. Nathan asks Haley not to see Chris anymore but she initially refuses. In response, Nathan violently threatens Chris to stay away. Lucas and Brooke find their way back to friendship. Anna apologies to Peyton for ghosting her and confesses there were rumors at her past school about her. Peyton lets her down gently but Anna runs away. Peyton decides to stand up to homophobia and is suspended from school. Keith decides to stay in Tree Hill as he is in love with Jules. Haley goes to tell Chris she is keeping her distance, but they kiss instead and he invites her to tour with him. Karen learns that Deb lied to her. Keith leaves Jules a voicemail saying he loves her, during which she is seen sitting with Dan. Dan tells her that things with Keith are going just as they planned. Lucas and Peyton have a huge fight as they’re both suffering because of the rift created between them due to the love triangle mess and they both miss each other, but they can’t make amends as Peyton accuses Lucas of being a bad friend who hasn’t been there for her lately even though Lucas swears he cares for her. Lucas and Anna break up, while Felix and Brooke decide to start a real relationship. Peyton, down and depressed, arranges a drug deal which turns bad when she has no money, but she is saved by the unexpected return of Jake. Haley meets with Chris to go on tour with him and kisses him again. Lucas goes to see Brooke but sees her kissing Felix. This episode is named after a song by Social Distortion.
33	11	"The Heart Brings You Back"	Matt Shakman	Mark B. Perry	January 25, 2005	2T5261	4.07
Haley decides not to go on tour and returns home to find her sister, Taylor, has arrived and needs a place to stay. Jake tells Peyton he came back because Lucas asked him to due to being worried about her and feeling she needed someone to be there for her, so Peyton shares with Jake that she has been going through a hard time and has struggled to stay away from drugs as a coping mechanism, constantly feeling like its raining. Karen tries to shut Deb out. Lucas learns that Jules has been lying to Keith and that she is working with Dan, but she promises she truly does love Keith. Nathan continues to not allow Lucas to play any basketball until he takes the test and confides in him that he recognizes Taylor because she and him slept together two years ago. Felix and Brooke start dating but she grows upset when he keeps buying her things. Anna apologizes to Peyton and kisses her. Peyton lets her down but Anna runs off. Taylor reveals to Nathan she remembers their hookup but agrees to keep it a secret if he will let her stay with them. After hearing that Lucas broke up with Anna, Felix beats up Lucas. Karen suspects that Andy is cheating on her while he is out of town, but in class the next day he reveals that he was visiting a woman who he injured many years ago. She apologizes and they reconcile. Jake decides to stay in town for good. Peyton and Jake head to Georgia to get Jenny, and Peyton notes that she doesn't think it's going to rain anymore. Deb apologizes to Karen who accepts. Anna shares with Lucas that she is bisexual. Haley and Nathan try to work on their marriage. This episode is named after a song by Blues Traveler.
34	12	"Between Order and Randomness"	Bethany Rooney	Terrence Coli	February 1, 2005	2T5262	4.13
Lucas and Karen are at odds over his refusal to take the HCM test, with Karen trying to force him to take it by making his life uncomfortable. Brooke gets a job where her boss treats her and the other employees unfairly. She works to advocate for better working conditions for her and the employees and wins her argument. The experience makes her decide that she wants to run for student council president. Haley continues to email Chris, and when Taylor finds out she gets involved. When Taylor starts manipulating Nathan, he comes clean to Haley about sleeping with Taylor. Haley confronts Taylor, who brings up her kissing Chris which leads to Haley quickly forgiving Nathan. Dan and Deb have dinner with Keith and Jules, where Dan tries to stir things up with Jules and blackmails her. Keith proposes to Jules and she accepts, but Lucas is weary of her intentions. Lucas decides to take the HCM test with Keith. He later accepts Keith's request to be his best man. Anna works to come to terms with her bisexuality. Taylor pretends to be Haley and ends things with Chris. Dan tells Lucas he’ll allow Keith and Jules to be happy if he moves in with him. This episode is named after a song by Shane Mills.
35	13	"The Hero Dies in This One"	Kevin Dowling	Jennifer Cecil	February 8, 2005	2T5263	4.47
Lucas tells Karen he doesn't have HCM. Karen is caught off guard by Keith's engagement and feels like she will now lose him. Nathan finds Haley and Chris’ emails but Haley blames them on Taylor. In response, Nathan tells her she has to leave. Brooke decides to run for student council president and immediately gets into a nasty race with the current president. When Michelle Branch and Jessica Harp (known together as "The Wreckers") perform at TRIC, Haley is surprised to see Chris is their opening act and has talked her up to them. Haley tells Nathan that she and Chris kissed when telling him that she wants to go on tour with Chris. Nathan says that if she leaves they are done. Lucas tells Karen he has to move in with Dan but won't tell her why. Peyton and Jake's friendship grows stronger and the two cuddle that night. Lucas moves out and it is revealed he does have HCM. Dan promises to pay for his medication and keep it their secret. Karen finds comfort in Andy. Mouth tells Brooke the truth about her window and says it's too hard for him to be friends with her. Nathan goes for a walk and revisits the spot where he and Haley had their first date and realizes he doesn't want her to leave, but when he gets home, she's gone. This episode is named after a song by The Ataris.
36	14	"The Quiet Things That No One Ever Knows"	Babu Subramaniam	R. Lee Fleming, Jr.	February 15, 2005	2T5264	4.28
After Haley leaves and cuts off contact with Nathan, he has an emotional crisis and brings beer into school leading to his suspension. Karen continues to struggle, trying to figure out what would cause Lucas to move in with Dan. Andy visits Dan and tells him to stop messing with Lucas and leaves a mysterious threat to Dan. Nathan becomes jealous of Lucas living with his parents and blames Haley's leaving on him. He tells Lucas that he ruined his life. Lucas contacts Haley who shrugs them off. Peyton and Jake continue living together but Peyton backs off when he says he doesn't want anything serious. Brooke and Erica face off in the peer endorsement rally where Mouth has to advocate for Brooke and she ultimately wins the election the next day. However, she realizes she and Marsha aren't that different and tries to be friendly to her. Nathan confides in Karen that he never realized how badly Dan treated her and breaks down crying saying he didn't mean for Haley to really leave. Karen promises him she’ll do the right thing. Brooke tells Mouth they're friends again. Peyton and Jake kiss. Karen plans to go to court but Andy says he has another way and later makes a call to a friend and tells him he's got a job for him. This episode is named after a song by Brand New.
37	15	"Unopened Letter to the World"	Greg Prange	Mark Schwahn	February 22, 2005	2T5265	4.25
When Tree Hill High does a time capsule project, the gang confesses their most intimate secrets to an anonymous video camera. When brought to court, Lucas opts to live with Dan and Deb rather than Karen, devastating Karen. Nathan's anger over Haley's absence continues to grow, eventually landing both Lucas and Nathan in jail. In jail, Nathan says more hurtful things to Lucas before getting into a fist fight. Afterwards, Lucas confesses why he's gotten so close to Dan. Peyton and Jake's feelings for each other heat up, and as they plan to go on their first date Peyton feels nervous about having sex for the first time since Jake is more experienced. Felix throws Brooke a party to celebrate her new gig as student body president. However, Brooke doesn't enjoy the party and realizes she's not about that anymore. Brooke takes a drunk Erica home and shows she's no longer a party girl. Anna and Mouth sneak into school to delete her time capsule video after she regrets saying she's bisexual. While looking for her video, Mouth watches a video of Brooke where she says she might be married to him in the future. Anna confides in Mouth. Keith buys a house for him and Jules, which leads her to want to tell him the truth. However, Dan promises her he won't tell Keith. Dan bails Nathan and Lucas out of jail and after Nathan reveals Lucas told him the truth, Lucas calls him dad. Lucas’ video reveals he plans to get close to Dan so he can finally destroy him once and for all. Andy tells Karen his friend found something on Dan. Anna's video reveals she is really gay, but she hopes that one day labels won't matter anymore. Brooke's video sees her hope that love will always matter. Peyton and Jake decide to go slow. Lucas takes Nathan out and tries to cheer him up. Whitey's video from fifty years ago is revealed: he was the example for the class. He hoped to grow old with Camilla, to have kids of his own, and to teach them about life and make a difference. A tear rolls down his eye as his realizes some things didn't come true, but he was there for the kids on his team. This episode is named after a song by The Ataris.
38	16	"Somewhere a Clock Is Ticking"	Billy Dickson	Stacy Rukeyser	March 1, 2005	2T5266	3.95
It's Keith and Jules' wedding day, and emotions are on the rise. Haley is going on national TV to promote her and Chris’ single and asks Nathan to watch. Andy and Deb think that Dan is having an affair with a woman named Emily. Lucas catches Deb taking prescription medication following Nathan's continued withdrawal from her. When he confronts her she angrily reprimands him to stay away. Peyton and Jake have their first time together. Andy and Karen declare their love for each other. Brooke asks Lucas to take her to the wedding as his date so she can promote her new student council initiative. The producers of the talk show want Haley and Chris to say they're a couple, but Haley refuses. Despite this, Chris lies and talks over her to say they are a couple, as Nathan watches. Nathan drunkenly shows up to the wedding and has to be escorted out after making a scene. Andy and Karen learn that Jules is really Emily and Karen confronts Jules, demanding she tell the truth to Keith. Jules seems to convince Karen she does love Keith. However, Jules runs away and doesn't walk down the aisle as Dan smiles contently and tells Karen this is on her. Keith finds Jules’ wedding dress at his house as Jules cries in her car. Karen tells Andy she has to talk to Keith. Deb gives Nathan money to go after Haley. Dan menacingly laughs, noting that one is down (Keith) and that he has one left to go - Deb. Brooke tearfully tells Lucas that her father got a job in California, and that she doesn't want to go. Nicky returns. This episode is named after a song by Snow Patrol.
39	17	"Something I Can Never Have"	Paul Johansson	Mike Herro & David Strauss	April 19, 2005	2T5267	4.08
Nicky has gone to court without telling Jake and earned full custody of Jenny. Jake refuses to give her up and goes into hiding. Keith visits Dan and beats him up after learning the truth about what he did with Jules. Keith feels like Lucas and Karen betrayed him. Brooke wants to stay with Peyton but her parents won't allow it as she has little parental supervision. Anna turns Felix in to the school authorities after finding a paint-stained t-shirt:he was the one who vandalized Peyton's locker. Andy meets with Jake and promises to help him fight Nicky in court, leading Jake to decide to stay. Meanwhile, Nathan visits Haley in the hope of bringing her home. Haley still isn't wearing her ring and says that she loves him but maybe they rushed into things. Peyton tells Brooke what Felix did and she breaks up with him. Felix is suspended from school and angrily confronts Anna as their parents are sending him to military school. She comes out to him and says his 'protecting her' made her feel afraid of herself. He leaves without saying a word. Lucas arranges for Brooke to stay with Karen in his old room. Karen explains her ground rules and Brooke hugs Karen. Keith leaves Tree Hill and tells Lucas he has nothing to come back to. Lucas catches Dan hiding something in the ceiling of his office. Nathan leaves Haley without saying goodbye and takes his ring off as he drives home. This episode is named after a song by Nine Inch Nails.
40	18	"The Lonesome Road"	Michael Lange	John A. Norris	April 26, 2005	2T5268	4.42
On his way home from seeing Haley, Nathan stops to visit Taylor hoping for some fun and maybe more. However, she never plans on letting him do anything and offers him advice for his relationship with Haley Meanwhile, Anna gets a surprise visit from her ex-girlfriend and is inspired to tell her parents about her sexuality. Anna decides to leave town and go back to her old school with her girlfriend to face her fears and rumors head on. Brooke learns the ropes of living in a house with rules while living with Karen. Lucas works with Andy to bring Dan down, finding that Dan has a bag of thousands of dollars hidden in his ceiling. When Andy and Lucas go to find the money, it's gone and the next day Dan installs cameras in the dealership. Peyton and Jake continue to hide Jenny from Nicki, but Jake's options close in and he realizes he must turn himself in if he ever wants to get Jenny back, but before doing it he sends Jenny to be with Whitey in order for her to be safe. Later, Lucas steals the papers Dan was shredding, believing them to be the ones he moved from the dealership. This episode is named after a song by Frank Sinatra.
41	19	"I'm Wide Awake, It's Morning"	Thomas J. Wright	Mark Schwahn	May 3, 2005	2T5269	4.05
Nathan's Uncle Cooper (Deb's younger brother) comes into town to take Nathan and Lucas on a racing trip. On the track, Nathan and Lucas are challenged to a race by the beautiful Daytona and her smart aleck brother Jarret. Nathan refuses to stop after the race and goes too fast and as he flashes back to his relationship with Haley, he crashes his car. Deb's addiction to pills intensifies. Dan exposes Andy's relationship with Karen to the class. Andy is fired and he later threatens Dan by saying karma will come to him. Karen, Deb, Peyton and Brooke spend time together bonding over their respective troubles. Deb learns Dan paid Jules to seduce Keith and has had enough of him. She plans to leave him but just as she does so she gets the call about Nathan’s accident. Peyton struggles with missing Jake. Before Nathan goes into surgery, he makes Lucas promise not to call Haley. Dan learns about Deb's pill addiction when her blood can't be used to help Nathan, who is in bad shape. Karen tries to contact Keith, but he won't answer any of their calls. Daytona and Lucas look at the crash site, as Daytona notices it looks like Nathan tried to crash into the wall deliberately. This episode is named after an album and the lyrics from a song by Bright Eyes.
42	20	"Lifetime Piling Up"	Les Butler	Mark B. Perry	May 10, 2005	2T5270	3.78
Lying in a coma after his race car accident, Nathan dreams of what life would have been like if Dan had stayed with Karen and Lucas instead of marrying Deb. In his imaginary world, Lucas has the wealth and stature and Nathan is the one growing up on the wrong side of the tracks. Karen has been having an affair with Keith, while Deb is the one with a cafe. Haley and Nathan are best friends and Brooke crushes on Nathan. Lucas and Nathan play a game to get the spot on the Highflier Team and Nathan wins. When he wakes up, Nathan realizes things about his life. He realizes he should be nicer to Deb and they make amends, but he also wishes he could get away from Dan. Lucas tells him he had to call Haley and asks him if he tried to end his life. Brooke begins putting together the shredded evidence Lucas collected - it is a receipt. Later that night, Nathan calls Haley and tells her he doesn't want her to come home. This episode is named after a song by Talking Heads.
43	21	"What Could Have Been"	Bethany Rooney	Jennifer Cecil	May 17, 2005	2T5271	4.20
Lucas learns from the receipt that Dan has been skimming three thousand off each cash car sale he makes (only cash sales over 10K need be declared). Nathan leaves hospital and returns home to a pile of unpaid bills and an eviction notice. Lucas is worried that Nathan tried to kill himself, and he, Peyton and Brooke throw a fundraiser at TRIC to raise money for him. But Dan has already paid his hospital bills. Nathan confronts Dan who asks him to sign an annulment of his marriage. Karen emails Keith promising to be there for him and he replies thanking her. Peyton struggles with Jake's absence as Brooke starts to get jealous again over Lucas and Peyton when Lucas tries to comfort Peyton and swears to be there for her whenever she is down no matter what. Nathan calls Deb and makes amends with her. Haley plans to come back home and forgo making a demo but backstage is greeted by Dan, who shows her Nathan has signed the annulment papers. Nathan tells Lucas he is moving back in with Dan to try and give his family a second chance, believing Dan might change. Plus he thinks his marriage got in the way of his and Haley's separate dreams. Brooke wants to ask Lucas to rekindle their relationship, but when she finds a keepsake box that Lucas made when he was with Peyton, she tearfully calls it off. Andy finds that Dan has put the skimmed cash into a college fund for Lucas. He asks Lucas if he wants him to back off and Lucas tells him to find everything. Lucas moves back home with Karen and Brooke. Karen suggests ground rules but Brooke says that she and Lucas are just friends. This episode is named after a song by Callenish Circle.
44	22	"The Tide That Left and Never Came Back"	Thomas J. Wright	Mark Schwahn	May 24, 2005	2T5272	3.61
Jake's lawyers are about to get him out of jail (they found a lie on Nikki's testimony), and he should get custody of Jenny after a hearing. Andy has to go home to New Zealand but won't be able to return as Dan is having him deported. Karen goes to confront Dan. Andy asks Karen to come with him to New Zealand. Whitey tells Nathan that he can still get him into basketball camp. Nathan tells Dan, who doesn't want him to go, and points out Nathan is still injured and then manipulates him by using Deb's vulnerability after rehab. Nicki visits Jake in jail to reveal she's found Jenny and is taking her away forever. Andy confounds Dan, telling him he knows about his tax evasion scam and that he owns the company who put in the security cameras, so he has proofs against him. Lucas pays Haley a visit on tour to ask her to come back for Nathan, but she tells him she's never coming back and gives him the signed annulment papers. Brooke tells Lucas it's okay that he’s not over Peyton. Jake breaks up with Peyton because he has to go find Jenny, then he leaves Tree Hill again. Andy is about to leave for New Zealand, and gives Lucas something. Karen tells Andy she loves him and he says he loves her too, but apparently it isn't enough. The group narrates their respective essays on loss, with each reflecting on how love and loss have shaped their year. This episode is named after a song by The Veils.
45	23	"The Leavers Dance"	Greg Prange	Mark Schwahn	May 24, 2005	2T5273	3.61
Brooke is getting ready to go to her parents in California but hopes to return in the fall. Lucas nearly tells her he has feelings for her but she deters him. A woman who claims to be a journalist named Ellie wants to interview Peyton, who is reluctant but tells her to come to TRIC. Lucas views the video Andy secretly recorded and is able to steal the ledger from Dan’s office. Karen hallucinates when she thinks she sees Keith outside the cafe as Deb walks in. Later, Deb tells Nathan she wants the two of them to be a family again and that they're getting away from Dan. Karen becomes increasingly worried over as Andy has not checked in yet, so she decides to go to New Zealand. Peyton tries to contact Ellie but is shocked to learn she is not a journalist. Lucas gives Deb Dan's ledger, but when she tells Dan, he says she'd go to jail too as he's made his company in her name. Dan also threatens Whitey and tells him his coaching days are over. Peyton is sent threatening emails after she turns on her webcam. Dan reveals to Lucas that the money in the ceiling, the ledger, all of it was an elaborate ruse to test his loyalty, and that he failed the test. He adds that he won’t pay for his medications anymore, but Lucas answers that now he can finally get over him and be free. Nathan learns that Lucas lied about Dan and seeing Haley and tells him that they aren't brothers or friends anymore. Lucas kisses Brooke goodbye and says he wants to be with her, but she tearfully just says goodbye and leaves. Lucas takes the last of his last heart medication. Ellie returns and tells Peyton her real name is Elizabeth. She's not the one sending the emails, but she's her mother. At the dealership, Dan finds a bottle of whiskey on his desk with the note “for everything you’ve done”. After drinking a glass of the whiskey he finds white powder on the rim of the bottle and begins feeling faint. As Dan is losing consciousness he sees a figure dressed in black who sets the dealership on fire. Nathan and Deb prepare to leave as Haley unexpectedly shows up at their door. Lucas finds Peyton on the beach and says it's just them this summer. Dan and the dealership burn. This episode is named after a song by The Veils.

== Ratings ==
Season	Timeslot	Season premiere	Season finale	TV season	Rank	Viewers (in millions)	Rating
2	Tuesday 9/8C	September 21, 2004	May 24, 2005	2004–2005	#129	4.34	1.9

== Home media ==
The DVD release of season two was released after the season has completed broadcast on television. It has been released in Regions 1, 2 and 4. As well as every episode from the season, the DVD release features bonus material such as audio commentaries on some episodes from the creator and cast, deleted scenes, gag reels and behind-the-scenes featurettes. The words "The WB Presents" were printed on the packaging before the "One Tree Hill" title, although they were not included on international releases as The WB was not the broadcaster.

The Complete Second Season
Set details			Special features
23 episodes; 1012 minutes (Region 1); 999 minutes (Region 2); 946 minutes (Region 4); 6-disc set; 1.78:1 aspect ratio; Languages: English (Dolby Digital 2.0 Surround); Subtitles: English, Spanish and French (Region 1); English, Danish, Finnish, Hebrew, Norwegian, Swedish, English For The Hearing Impaired (Region 4)			Audio commentaries: "Don't Take Me for Granted" - with creator/executive producer/writer Mark Schwahn; "Unopened Letter to the World" - with creator/executive producer/writer Mark Schwahn and actor Bryan Greenberg; "Something I Can Never Have" - with director/actor Paul Johansson; Deleted scenes: Episodes: 1, 6, 7, 8, 9, 10, 11, 12, 13, 14, 17, 18, 20, 21, 22 & 23; "The Music of One Tree Hill, Including a Backstage Glimpse of the Concert Tour"; "Diaries from the Set": "Charity Football Match"; "Get on the Bus"; "Change is Good: Season 2's New Characters"
Release dates
United States	United Kingdom	Australia	
September 13, 2005	April 10, 2006	September 6, 2006	
