= One Tree Hill season 5 =

One Tree Hill
- Season 5
- One Tree Hill Season 5 DVD cover
- No. of episodes: 18

Release
- Original network: The CW
- Original release: January 8 – May 19, 2008

Season chronology
- ← Previous; Season 4 Next → Season 6

The fifth season of One Tree Hill, an American television series, began on January 8, 2008, with a two-hour episode. This is the second season to air on The CW television network. Season five is set four years into the future from the season 4 finale, and after the main characters have graduated from college.

Production for this season of One Tree Hill, along with production for all other American scripted television shows, was caught in the middle of a contract dispute between the Writers Guild of America and the Alliance of Motion Picture and Television Producers (AMPTP). The dispute led to a strike by the writers, which has caused a lack in episodes being produced. The season had to conclude in June 2008, after twenty-two episodes, but it had been initially shortened to twelve episodes due to the 2007–2008 Writers Guild of America strike. Then, with the strike resolved, the CW announced that six more episodes would be produced, bringing the season's total episode count to eighteen.

== Cast and characters ==
=== Main ===
- Chad Michael Murray as Lucas Scott
- James Lafferty as Nathan Scott
- Hilarie Burton as Peyton Sawyer
- Bethany Joy Galeotti as Haley James Scott
- Sophia Bush as Brooke Davis
- Paul Johansson as Dan Scott
- Lee Norris as Mouth McFadden
- Antwon Tanner as Antwon "Skills" Taylor
- Jackson Brundage as James Lucas Scott

=== Recurring ===
- Michaela McManus as Lindsey Strauss
- Robbie Jones as Quentin Fields
- Lisa Goldstein as Millicent Huxtable
- Torrey DeVitto as Carrie
- Daphne Zuniga as Victoria Davis
- Kate Voegele as Mia Catalano
- Danneel Harris as Rachel Gatina
- Barbara Alyn Woods as Deb Lee
- Joe Manganiello as Owen Morello
- Cullen Moss as Junk Moretti
- Vaughn Wilson as Fergie Thompson
- Stephen Colletti as Chase Adams
- Bradley Evans as Jerry
- Kelly Collins Lintz as Alice Day
- Shawn Shepard as Principal Turner

=== Special guest stars ===
- Barry Corbin as Whitey Durham
- Moira Kelly as Karen Roe
- Kieren Hutchison as Andy Hargrove
- Bevin Prince as Bevin Mirskey
- Brett Claywell as Tim Smith
- The Honorary Title as themselves

== Episodes ==
No. overall	No. in season	Title	Directed by	Written by	Original release date	Prod. code	U.S. viewers (millions)
89	1	"4 Years, 6 Months, 2 Days"	Greg Prange	Mark Schwahn	January 8, 2008	3T6801	3.36
The care free days are over for the former students of Tree Hill High as 4 years has passed since their last night on the Rivercourt. Some achieved the dreams of success that they set for themselves back in high school, while others hit roadblocks on their journey to adulthood that they were never able to come back from. This episode is named after a song by Tree Fort Angst.
90	2	"Racing Like a Pro"	Paul Johansson	Mark Schwahn	January 8, 2008	3T6802	3.57
Peyton and Brooke move back to Tree Hill and meet Lucas' girlfriend Lindsay; Haley gives Nathan some tough love by threatening something precious to him; Lucas and Skills prepare Jamie to compete in a race car competition; Mouth gets a job but his boss Alice hates him. This episode is named after a song by The National.
91	3	"My Way Home Is Through You"	David Jackson	John A. Norris	January 15, 2008	3T6803	2.72
Lindsay fears that Peyton might threaten her relationship with Lucas. Nathan visits Dan in prison and gives him a picture of Jamie. Haley tries to get a student, Quentin, back in school. Brooke opens her store "Clothes Over Bros". in Karen's Cafe. Peyton signs her first band on her new label. This episode is named after a song by My Chemical Romance.
92	4	"It's Alright, Ma (I'm Only Bleeding)"	Janice Cooke	Adele Lim	January 22, 2008	3T6804	3.04
Peyton has her hands full with a musician who turns out to be very problematic; Mouth's in a relationship with his boss Alice and dating her is how he's keeping his job. Brooke faces problems with her insane mother Victoria. Nathan helps Haley in helping Quentin. This episode is named after a song by Bob Dylan.
93	5	"I Forgot to Remember to Forget"	Liz Friedlander	Terrence Coli	January 29, 2008	3T6805	2.79
Lucas and Peyton finally tell the story about how their relationship ended. Victoria (Daphne Zuniga) pressures Brooke to make a difficult decision about the future of her clothing line. This episode is named after a song by Elvis Presley.
94	6	"Don't Dream It's Over"	Thomas J. Wright	Mark Schwahn	February 5, 2008	3T6806	2.86
Tensions are at an all-time high in Tree Hill as Lucas reached his limit with Peyton's rudeness to Lindsay. Brooke and Victoria’s mother daughter relationship hits another roadblock. Haley has trouble with Quentin and also is concerned about Nathan's recovery. Mouth is forced to pick his coworkers or Alice. This episode is named after a song by Crowded House.
95	7	"In Da Club"	Greg Prange	Mike Herro & David Strauss	February 12, 2008	3T6807	3.16
Brooke sets Mouth up on a blind date with her assistant Millicent and finds out about Mouth and his boss. Carrie tries to seduce Nathan. The Honorary Title performs at Tric, and Mia performs her song, "No Good". Quentin steps up to Haley's defense, but at what cost? This episode is named after a song by 50 Cent.
96	8	"Please, Please, Please Let Me Get What I Want"	Paul Johansson	Mike Daniels	February 19, 2008	3T6808	2.85
Brooke has a crush on the new bartender Owen. Carrie kisses Nathan. Haley is upset at Lucas for proposing to Lindsay and kissing Peyton. Quentin has to change his negative approach before the Ravens start the season-opening game. Mouth's boss Alice gets fired, and Mouth tries to win Millicent back. This episode is named after a song by The Smiths.
97	9	"For Tonight You're Only Here to Know"	Joe Davola	Mark Schwahn	February 26, 2008	3T6809	3.18
At the first Raven's basketball game of the season, Haley, Brooke, Peyton, Lindsey and Mia find themselves locked in the Tree Hill High library where secrets abound come forward. Peyton learns a surprising fact that changes her mind about Lindsey while she and Haley try to help Brooke let go of Victoria. This episode is named after a song by The Distillers.
98	10	"Running to Stand Still"	Clark Mathis	William H. Brown	March 4, 2008	3T6810	2.93
Haley finds Nathan and Carrie in a compromising position and kicks them both out. Brooke and Owen take a trip to New York. Peyton's old boss wants Mia signed at his label. Lucas gets a brief about Dan's hearing and goes with Nathan. This episode is named after a song by U2.
99	11	"You're Gonna Need Someone on Your Side"	Michael J. Leone	Zachary Haynes	March 11, 2008	3T6811	2.50
On the eve of Lucas and Lindsey's marriage, they conspire to save Nathan and Haley's. Brooke sets Peyton up with an old boyfriend, while still dealing with Victoria. Rachel returns to Tree Hill, and Dan comes back hoping for a fresh start. This episode is named after a song by Morrissey.
100	12	"Hundred"	Les Butler	Mark Schwahn	March 18, 2008	3T6812	3.00
It's Lucas and Lindsey's wedding day and Peyton must decide what to do about her feelings for Lucas. Nathan uses the occasion to attempt a reconciliation with Haley, and recently-paroled Dan shows up for the family reunion. Carrie kidnaps Jamie, but Dan steps in to intervene. This episode is named after a song by The Fray.
101	13	"Echoes, Silence, Patience, and Grace"	Greg Prange	Mark Schwahn	April 14, 2008	3T6813	2.80
Lucas deals with being left at the altar by Lindsey, while Nathan and Haley deal with the repercussions of Jamie's abduction. Brooke is haunted by her past as she considers adopting, while Peyton gets a visit from an old friend. This episode is named after an album by Foo Fighters.
102	14	"What Do You Go Home To?"	Liz Friedlander	Mark Schwahn	April 21, 2008	3T6814	2.93
Lucas and Peyton discuss his aborted wedding, while Brooke gets a phone call that could change her life. Millicent and Mouth take a new step in their relationship. Haley takes the first tentative steps towards a new career, and Nathan contemplates what it would take to get his game back. This episode is named after a song by Explosions in the Sky.
103	15	"Life Is Short"	Paul Johansson	Eliza Delson	April 28, 2008	3T6815	2.57
Lindsey returns to Tree Hill for Jamie's fifth birthday party, giving Lucas hope for their relationship. Brooke and Peyton prepare for life with a new baby. Dan tries to insert himself back into the lives of his family, ultimately revealing a secret to Nathan. This episode is named after a song by Butterfly Boucher.
104	16	"Cryin' Won't Help You Now"	Greg Prange	William H. Brown	May 5, 2008	3T6816	2.29
Brooke deals with the difficulties of being a parent. Peyton visits Lindsey in New York. Quentin makes up with his enemies. Mouth gets his big-time shot. Lucas, Nathan, and Haley deal with Dan's condition and whether or not to tell Jamie. This episode is named after a song by Ben Harper.
105	17	"Hate Is Safer Than Love"	Stuart Gillard	Mark Schwahn	May 12, 2008	3T6817	2.72
Lucas receives some devastating news from Lindsey. Brooke's foster baby undergoes heart surgery. Haley makes a decision about recording a new album. Skills and Nathan attempt a turn-around of the Ravens' season. Lucas makes a drunken, heart-wrenching confession to Peyton. This episode is named after a song by Ben Godwin.
106	18	"What Comes After the Blues?"	Mark Schwahn	Mark Schwahn	May 19, 2008	3T6818	3.23
Brooke is emotional about giving Angie back. Lucas deals with the aftermath of his actions in the game night scuffle. Haley has a musical breakthrough. Peyton gets news about a ghost from her past. Nathan and Jamie face their fears together. Lucas makes a call to one of the women that will change his life forever. This episode is named after a song by Magnolia Electric Co.

== Production ==
L-R: Brooke (Bush), Haley (Galeotti), "Mouth" (Norris), "Skills" (Tanner), Nathan (Lafferty), Peyton (Burton) and Lucas (Murray).

On May 17, 2007, The CW announced that the show would return for a fifth season as a mid-season replacement. The show was dramatically retooled and set four years into the future – after the characters have already graduated from college. Until the show's return to the schedule, the network planned to post diaries online to fill in the intervening years in the characters' lives. The fifth season began shooting on July 30, 2007, and premiered January 8, 2008. Dawn Ostroff confirmed on July 20, 2007, that One Tree Hill had a 22-episode order.

Hilarie Burton confirmed on TRL that the show's fifth season would focus on their lives after college, citing the reason for this as "We've seen the high school dramas not do so well while they're in college, and another thing, we've done everything that everyone does in college". She said this will "enable them to do flashbacks and a lot of cool stuff with the characters".

=== Writers Strike ===
On November 5, 2007, a strike began between the Writers Guild of America, East (WGAE), Writers Guild of America, west (WGAw) and the Alliance of Motion Picture and Television Producers (AMPTP). The strike was speculated to force television shows to end their seasons early, because there would be no future scripts until a settlement was reached. Due to the writer's strike, only twelve out of the twenty-two episodes ordered were thought to be produced. With the end in sight, Mark Schwahn stated, "Although we have six new episodes left, no one is more excited about the end of the strike than we are at One Tree Hill." On the February 5, 2008, episode, One Tree Hill's ratings were second only to Smallville for scripted dramas at the CW. Schwahn went on to say that "we'd love the opportunity to continue season five, and if the WGA's new contract is ratified, hopefully we'll be able to do just that. If not, we'll see you for season six." On February 15, the CW announced that six additional episodes would be produced to wrap up the season due to the conclusion of the strike.

=== New and returning characters ===
For season five, Jackson Brundage was cast as James Scott, the child of Nathan and Haley Scott. Barry Corbin reprised his role as Whitey Durham for a flashback sequence. Danneel Harris returned, as a recurring not main cast member, to portray Rachel Gatina, who is now a drug addict. Moira Kelly also returned as Lucas' mother Karen Roe. Barbara Alyn Woods reprised her role of Deb Lee in the fourteenth episode, appearing in a total of four episodes.

Cullen Moss and Vaughn Wilson returned as Junk Moretti and Fergie Thompson, living with Mouth and Skills. Stephen Colletti reprised his guest role as Chase Adams, as did Kieren Hutchison as Andy Hargrove. Shawn Shepard returned to portray Tree Hill High's principal, Principal Turner, where Haley, Lucas and Skills now work. Brett Claywell returned as Tim Smith, working as a pizza boy. Bevin Prince also returned as Bevin Mirskey, married to Tim Smith, with whom she has a son, Nathan Smith.

Newcomer Michaela McManus was added to the cast for a multi-episode arc as Lindsey Strauss, a "tough but kind" New York editor assigned to work on Lucas' novel. Daphne Zuniga guest starred as a "glamorous and intimidating" business exec who works with Brooke, later revealed to be her mother. Torrey DeVitto has signed on to play the nanny of Nathan and Haley's son in a multi-episode arc. Robbie Jones joined the cast as Quentin Fields, a difficult student and member of the Ravens. Kelly Collins Lintz became a guest as Mouth's boss Alice. Lisa Goldstein was cast as Brooke's assistant as Millicent Huxtable. Kevin Federline appears in a multi-episode arc this season playing Jason, as well as singer/songwriter Kate Voegele who portrays Mia. Joe Manganiello has also been added as Owen, a bar tender at Tric. Mary Kate Englehardt returned to play the role of Lily Roe Scott.

== One Tree Hill: Fast Forward ==
On November 6, 2007, The CW posted the first One Tree Hill online diary, a series of six segments to be released before the start of the new season. One Tree Hill Fast Forward allows fans of the show to catch a glimpse of the lives of the six main characters at the beginning of the fifth season. The first Fast Forward diary features Sophia Bush's character, Brooke Davis. The second diary, posted on November 13, featured Chad Michael Murray's character, Lucas Scott. The third diary, posted on November 20, featured Hilarie Burton's character, Peyton Sawyer. The fourth diary, posted on November 27, featured Lee Norris's character, Mouth McFadden. The fifth diary, posted on December 4 featured the Scott-James family, consisting of Bethany Joy Galeotti's character, Haley James Scott and James Lafferty's character, Nathan Scott. The sixth and last diary, posted on December 11, featured all the new faces of the show, commented by Mark Schwahn, Joe Davola, the six main teens and the above listed new faces (minus Jamie).

== Reception ==
The overall season averaged 2.89 million viewers and ranked #122 with 1.3 rating.

== DVD release ==
The DVD release of season five was released after the season has completed broadcast on television. It has been released in Region 1. As well as every episode from the season, the DVD release features bonus material such as audio commentaries on some episodes from the creator and cast, deleted scenes, gag reels and behind-the-scenes featurettes.

The Complete Fifth Season
Set details			Special features
18 episodes; 759 minutes (Region 1); 777 minutes (Region 2); 810 minutes (Region 4); 5-disc set; 1.78:1 aspect ratio; Languages: English (Dolby Digital 5.1); Subtitles: English, Spanish French (Region 1)			Audio commentaries; "For Tonight You're Only Here to Know" – with creator/executive producer/writer Mark Schwahn, and actresses Michaela McManus and Kate Voegele.; "Hundred" – with creator/executive producer/co-writer Mark Schwahn and executive producers Joe Davola and Greg Prange.; Deleted scenes; Episodes: 1, 2, 3, 4, 6, 7, 8, 10, 11; Gag reel; "One Tree Hill Fast Forward"; "One Tree Hill Musical Stars"; Kate Voegele "Only Fooling Myself" music video
Release dates			Audio commentaries; "For Tonight You're Only Here to Know" – with creator/executive producer/writer Mark Schwahn, and actresses Michaela McManus and Kate Voegele.; "Hundred" – with creator/executive producer/co-writer Mark Schwahn and executive producers Joe Davola and Greg Prange.; Deleted scenes; Episodes: 1, 2, 3, 4, 6, 7, 8, 10, 11; Gag reel; "One Tree Hill Fast Forward"; "One Tree Hill Musical Stars"; Kate Voegele "Only Fooling Myself" music video
United States	United Kingdom	Australia	Audio commentaries; "For Tonight You're Only Here to Know" – with creator/executive producer/writer Mark Schwahn, and actresses Michaela McManus and Kate Voegele.; "Hundred" – with creator/executive producer/co-writer Mark Schwahn and executive producers Joe Davola and Greg Prange.; Deleted scenes; Episodes: 1, 2, 3, 4, 6, 7, 8, 10, 11; Gag reel; "One Tree Hill Fast Forward"; "One Tree Hill Musical Stars"; Kate Voegele "Only Fooling Myself" music video
August 26, 2008	October 6, 2008	April 1, 2009	Audio commentaries; "For Tonight You're Only Here to Know" – with creator/executive producer/writer Mark Schwahn, and actresses Michaela McManus and Kate Voegele.; "Hundred" – with creator/executive producer/co-writer Mark Schwahn and executive producers Joe Davola and Greg Prange.; Deleted scenes; Episodes: 1, 2, 3, 4, 6, 7, 8, 10, 11; Gag reel; "One Tree Hill Fast Forward"; "One Tree Hill Musical Stars"; Kate Voegele "Only Fooling Myself" music video
