= One Tree Hill season 9 =

One Tree Hill
- Season 9
- One Tree Hill Season 9 DVD cover
- No. of episodes: 13

Release
- Original network: The CW
- Original release: January 11 – April 4, 2012

Season chronology
- ← Previous; Season 8

The ninth and final season of One Tree Hill, an American television series created by Mark Schwahn for The WB Television Network, was officially ordered by the CW on May 17, 2011. Two days later, the network announced that the ninth season would serve as the series' final season. Premiering on January 11, 2012, the series aired its 13 episodes uninterrupted. This is the only season of the series to be shot in digital high-definition instead of film.

This season takes place one year after the season eight finale, marking the series' third time jump in four years. Original series co-lead James Lafferty opted to return as a part-time regular for the final season, with original cast members Bethany Joy Lenz and Sophia Bush returning to lead the season with Austin Nichols, Robert Buckley, Shantel VanSanten, Jackson Brundage, Lee Norris, Jana Kramer, Lisa Goldstein and Stephen Colletti. Additionally, Paul Johansson and Tyler Hilton returned as regulars after notable absences, whilst former stars Chad Michael Murray, Antwon Tanner, Barbara Alyn Woods, and Craig Sheffer returned for guest appearances.

The season opened to 1.75 million viewers and a 0.9 Adults 18–49 rating, up 26% in viewers compared to its season eight finale. The final episode aired on April 4, 2012, concluding the series with 1.43 million viewers.

== Cast and characters ==
=== Main ===
- James Lafferty as Nathan Scott (Note: Lafferty is only credited in the episodes in which he appears.)
- Bethany Joy Galeotti as Haley James Scott
- Sophia Bush as Brooke Davis
- Austin Nichols as Julian Baker
- Robert Buckley as Clay Evans
- Shantel VanSanten as Quinn James
- Jackson Brundage as Jamie Scott
- Lee Norris as Mouth McFadden
- Jana Kramer as Alex Dupre
- Lisa Goldstein as Millicent Huxtable
- Stephen Colletti as Chase Adams
- Tyler Hilton as Chris Keller
- Paul Johansson as Dan Scott

=== Recurring ===
- Antwon Tanner as Skills Taylor
- Daphne Zuniga as Victoria Davis
- Chelsea Kane as Tara Richards
- Pierce Gagnon as Logan Evans
- Richard Burgi as Ted Davis
- Allison Munn as Lauren
- Cullen Moss as Junk Moretti
- Vaughn Wilson as Fergie Thompson
- Michael May as Chuck Scolnik
- Devin McGee as Xavier Daniels
- Bradley Evans as Jerry
- Kelley Davis as Mrs. Scolnik
- Katherine Landry as Madison
- Genna Poletti as Genna
- Alexa Poletti as Alexa
- Katelin Hall as Caitlin
- Lance Tafelski as Sergei
- Manu Intiraymi as Billy

=== Special guest stars ===
- Chad Michael Murray as Lucas Scott
- Craig Sheffer as Keith Scott
- Barbara Alyn Woods as Deb Lee
- Bevin Prince as Bevin Mirskey
- Sasha Jackson as Kylie Frost
- Scott Holroyd as David Lee Fletcher

== Episodes ==
No. overall	No. in season	Title	Directed by	Written by	Original release date	Prod. code	U.S. viewers (millions)
175	1	"Know This, We've Noticed"	Mark Schwahn	Mark Schwahn	January 11, 2012	3X7201	1.72
As Brooke and Julian begin to adjust to life with their new children, Haley and Nathan find themselves dealing with similar issues. Although they don't know it yet, faces from the past threaten to interrupt plans for all their futures. Meanwhile, a mysterious problem arises for Clay and Quinn. Nathan finds out Dan came back into town. Chris Keller returns to run Redbedroom Records. This episode is named after a song by An Horse.
176	2	"In the Room Where You Sleep"	Joe Davola	Mark Schwahn	January 18, 2012	3X7202	1.53
Brooke discusses a new business venture with her father, despite her mothers wishes, as Julian stresses about his own investment in a sound studio. Quinn convinces Clay to get help, and Millie struggles to be honest with Mouth about his weight gain. Meanwhile, Chase asks Alex to move in with him as Chris makes Alex an offer she may not be able to refuse to tour. Nathan volunteers to scout in Europe, leaving Dan with Haley, Jamie, and Lydia. This episode is named after a song by Dead Man's Bones.
177	3	"Love the Way You Lie"	Paul Johansson	Lenn K. Rosenfeld	January 25, 2012	3X7203	1.46
After Alex leaves for her tour, Chris looks to hire an intern and tries to cheer up Chase. Haley runs into trouble at Karen's Cafe when her chef quits to work for a rival cafe. Clay arouses suspicion in Quinn that he is cheating on her. Meanwhile, Millie accidentally humiliates Mouth on the air. Brooke tries to help her father secure funding for her new clothing line, and Julian gets distracted by the prospect of a potential renter for his sound stage, resulting in Julian forgetting his son, Davis, in the family car, to which the police and an ambulance have been alerted. This episode is named after a song by Eminem and Rihanna.
178	4	"Don't You Want to Share the Guilt?"	Les Butler	Nikki Schiefelbein	February 1, 2012	3X7204	1.52
Clay gets into trouble and Quinn gets involved; Julian deals with his guilt over leaving the baby in the car; Mouth agrees to take care of his health but continues eating when Millie is asleep. Meanwhile, a new cafe opens and the owner immediately angers Brooke and Haley. This episode is named after a song by Kate Nash.
179	5	"The Killing Moon"	Greg Prange	Shaina Fewell	February 8, 2012	3X7205	1.35
Nathan seems to have vanished on his way home, Haley goes searching for him and ultimately suspects Dan of having something to do with it. Tara gives Brooke a cockroach-infested flower as a "Face to face friends request", ultimately causing Brooke to destroy Tara's cafe after Tara gets personal in her attacks. Chase continues to feel guilty for sleeping with Tara behind Chris Keller's back. Chase also feels unwanted after Chuck spends all his attention on Keller and later his father, who finally comes back home. Clay checks into rehab, and Quinn spends the day babysitting Jamie & Lydia. This episode is named after a song by Echo and the Bunnymen.
180	6	"Catastrophe and the Cure"	James Lafferty	Roger Grant	February 15, 2012	3X7206	1.40
Dan enlists Julian to help in his search for Nathan. Mouth fills Clay in about Nathan, as Haley explains Nathan's disappearance to Jamie. Brooke gets an idea of how to bring patrons to an empty Karen's Cafe, and Chris Keller confronts Chase about Tara. This episode is named after a song by the band Explosions in the Sky.
181	7	"Last Known Surroundings"	Austin Nichols	Mark Schwahn	February 22, 2012	3X7207	1.43
Haley seeks help from Lucas as Nathan makes an escape attempt. Lucas takes Jamie and Lydia out of town to stay with him and Peyton until Haley can find Nathan and bring him home. Brooke comes face-to-face with Xavier who is up for parole. Julian uncovers evidence that assists Dan in his search for Nathan. Clay makes a connection with another patient in rehab. Episode is named after a song by the band Explosions in the Sky.
182	8	"A Rush of Blood to the Head"	Greg Prange	Johnny Richardson	February 29, 2012	3X7208	1.57
Haley gets a phone call that may change her life forever. Clay receives life changing news while revisiting his past. While Dan revisits his past during his search for Nathan, Deb returns. Haley goes to identify a body that is thought to be Nathan. Chase goes to extreme measures to protect Chuck. This episode is named after a song and album by Coldplay.
183	9	"Every Breath Is a Bomb"	Peter B. Kowalski	Ian Biggins	March 7, 2012	3X7209	1.47
Haley partners up with Dan to help search for Nathan. Brooke and Julian take new measures to protect their family. Chase faces consequences for defending Chuck. Skills helps Mouth get to a turning point. Clay reveals his past to Logan. Episode is named after a song by the band The Blood Brothers.
184	10	"Hardcore Will Never Die, But You Will"	Mark Schwahn	Mark Schwahn	March 14, 2012	3X7210	1.52
Dan, Julian and Chris attempt to rescue Nathan. During the rescue, Nathan is saved and Dan kills most of the attackers. When they are about to escape, Dan is shot by Demetri before he himself is shot by Nathan. Brooke's conflict with Xavier escalates when he attacks her in a parking garage, she is saved by the rival cafe owner Tara, who tasers him. Clay and Quinn revisit the past. Episode is named after an album by the band Mogwai.
185	11	"Danny Boy"	Joe Davola	Mike Herro & David Strauss	March 21, 2012	3X7211	1.50
After successfully rescuing Nathan, Dan's life hangs in the balance. Nathan looks back on his father's life and forgives him for all he has done. Brooke's father surprises her when he comes back into town. Clay and Quinn reconnect with Logan. Episode is named after a song by Andy Williams.
186	12	"Anyone Who Had a Heart"	Sophia Bush	Brian L. Ridings	March 28, 2012	3X7212	1.34
As Haley prepares to present the annual Tree Hill Burning Boat Festival, Brooke uses the opportunity to process her father's betrayal, while Julian tries to breathe new life into a past idea. Mouth and Millie make a change to their morning show, and Clay and Quinn get ready for Logan's first night at the beach house. Clay proposes to Quinn and Chase is offered to buy Tric. This episode is named after a song by Dionne Warwick and later Cilla Black.
187	13	"One Tree Hill"	Mark Schwahn	Mark Schwahn	April 4, 2012	3X7213	1.43
In the final chapter of One Tree Hill, the tenth anniversary of Tric brings old faces and new possibilities for the Tree Hill family; Quinn adopts Logan and marries Clay, Haley introduces Jamie to her predictions with Lucas and Julian buys Brooke her childhood home. In the time-jump, the Tree Hill gang are seen at Jamie's high-school basketball game, where his jersey is seen on the wall as the "all time top scorer". Bevin makes a guest appearance who is also seen back with Skills and Millie is pregnant. This episode is named after a song by U2 and the series title itself.

== Production ==
The CW officially renewed One Tree Hill for a ninth season on May 17, 2011. Mark Pedowitz, president of entertainment at the CW, said of the renewal, "We felt it would be really good for the viewers to have. It's a good show. The viewers loved it. So we thought we'd keep it going. The fans are very fervent about it, so we felt it was a great treat for them. On May 19, 2011, Dawn Ostroff confirmed that the 13 episodes for season nine would be the last for the series. In the official announcement of the CW's schedule, they confirmed the series stars and the executive producers for the final season. Mark Schwahn, Joe Davola, Greg Prange, Mike Tollin, and Brian Robbins continued in their roles on the show. Deadline reported that the final season would begin airing mid-season and its 13 episodes would air uninterrupted, leading into the series finale.

Production for the season began on July 7, 2011, at the Screen Gems Studios, Wilmington, North Carolina. While further scenes are shot in downtown Wilmington, including Wallace Park and Pure Gold Gentlemen's Club. The Corning manufacturing site on North College Road is also being used as the location for some scenes based in Tree Hill's hospital, police station and TV studio. A two-day shoot for some scenes in the season was also held at Kinston Regional Jetport. Paul Johansson will direct at least one episode in the season. At the Television Critics Association summer press tour, Mark Pedowitz said, "At this point it's the final 13", about the possibility of extending the season. He added, "You never want to say never", revealing that he did speak to executive producer Mark Schwahn and that they agreed that 13 episodes was the best number to close the series with. One Tree Hill filmed its final scenes on November 16, 2011.

The season aired Wednesdays at 8:00 pm Eastern/7:00 pm Central as a lead-in to new reality series, "Remodeled". It premiered on January 11, 2012, with an encore following immediately after. There was no opening credit sequence during the final season as producers didn't want to waste time that could potentially be used for story. Gavin Degraw will perform in the series finale. The series's final epilogue was sports-themed.

In an interview with Carina Mackenzie of Zap2it, Sophia Bush revealed she was the first person to be approached for season nine, and the first to sign on. "The idea that we would do this as 13 final episode[s] and almost shoot like it a miniseries really appealed to me," she says. "On a professional level, if we had shot 22 episodes, it would be one more year we'd be shooting through pilot season and unavailable for other things." When discussing the shows series finale and she being upset about the end, she said, "On the same side of the coin, most shows don't last this long. Most shows don't make it 6 years let alone 9, so I really feel like it's all just been a gift." In another interview, Bethany Joy Galeotti revealed her own reasons for returning, "It was a really tough decision, but I have a few friendships here that I wasn't ready to walk away from yet. Season 8 ended with like a booze-on-stage-8 kind of party. I was kind of like 'This can't be how we say goodbye. At least let's come back for 13 more episodes.'"

Sophia Bush directed the penultimate episode of the series. The CW has given more promotion for the launch of the final season than it has since the fifth season. Mark Pedowitz said, "I'm a big believer in giving shows a proper sendoff. "It deserves a proper sendoff. Not many shows last nine years. Mark, his team and the cast deserve a really good sendoff. I think we did a good job for them this year."

After backlash from fans about whether Sophia Bush had asked not to work with Murray during his episode, she cleared up the matter in an interview with Zap2it:

"When I got the script and saw that Lucas was back, I called Mark, and I told him that if he wanted to write scenes where the whole gang gets together at Haley's house and talks about how they're going to find Nathan, then he should write that. I've never asked not to work with any former cast mates, and I'm certainly not going to start now, in the final season. This show is too important to me, and these characters are too important to me, and the fans are too important to me."

The series finale aired on Wednesday, April 4, 2012, 8:00—10:00 p.m., as a special two-hour event. It featured interviews with the series' stars as they look back at the shows most memorable moments.

=== Cast ===
Over the years the One Tree Hill cast and crew has become a small unit. It's really a small family and they have asked for a few years if I wanted to come back. [Last year I said], 'If they have one more season I will definitely do it,' and sure enough they were asked back, against all odds, so I had to comply.

— Tyler Hilton on returning to the series.

Before season eight had finished filming, original cast members Bethany Joy Lenz and Sophia Bush signed on for a final season, while James Lafferty was expected to return part-time. Austin Nichols, Robert Buckley, Lisa Goldstein, Jana Kramer, Shantel Vansanten and Stephen Colletti are also contracted through season nine. The regulars for season nine—as listed on a press release from the CW—are Sophia Bush, Bethany Joy Lenz, James Lafferty, Austin Nichols, Robert Buckley, Shantel VanSanten and Jackson Brundage. Though, others later signed on. At the CW upfront presentation, the network expressed confidence that Chad Michael Murray and Hilarie Burton would return. Mark Pedowitz said, that with everyone knowing season nine will be the last, it makes it more possible for old cast members to return. On July 11, 2011, it was announced that Tyler Hilton would reprise his role as Chris Keller. Ten years have passed since he was last seen. He is rumored to return to help Haley run Red Bedroom Records as Peyton is still away. It was later reported that Hilton would return in the season premiere as a series regular. Kristin Dos Santos revealed that Paul Johansson will be returning to the series full-time as a regular.

TVLine revealed that James Lafferty will appear in half of the season. Zap2it later reported that he will remain a series regular, and revealed he will appear in exactly seven episodes. Chelsea Kane has been cast in a recurring role as Tara, a rival café owner to Haley and Brooke. Lisa Goldstein will continue on the series as a regular. Jana Kramer will only appear in the first two episodes, due to the actress' musical commitments. Barbara Alyn Woods will be reprising her role as Deb Lee after taking a break from season six to spend time with her kids. Zap2it later reported that she will return for two episodes. Describing the circumstances around her return, they said she hasn't always been the most maternal person, but will prove she can still be "mom" when the situation demands it.

The CW announced on their official website that Chad Michael Murray will return as Lucas Scott for a guest appearance. Lucas returns to Tree Hill when Haley reaches out to him for help. Murray later revealed he will return for one episode. He will appear in the seventh episode of the season. Murray revealed in an interview his reasons for returning, "The fans have loved this show and rooted for every character throughout its run. I know how important Luke's return is for our fans and wanted to give them one last 'Lucas Scott' moment. Luke's return is for them." Former Desperate Housewives actor Richard Burgi, has been cast as Brooke's father, in a recurring role. Allison Munn and Scott Holroyd will return during season nine as Miss Lauren and David Fletcher, respectively. They will return as a couple, and she will be carrying his child. Devin McGee—who portrayed Brooke's attacker and Quentin's murderer, Xavier Daniels during season six—will also return during the season. James Lafferty has signed on for one extra episode, which will be the series finale. Bevin Prince will return as Bevin Mirskey in the series finale. Antwon Tanner will also be a part of the final episode.

Mark Schwahn revealed in an interview with Zap2it that they did reach out to Hilarie Burton to return with Murray, "We would have liked to include Hilarie as well but she has a [son] now, and she has a job, and she's doing well and she just felt like her free time away from work she wanted to spend with her [son], which is a completely plausible, nice answer," he said.

=== Storylines ===
Lucas needs to come back to combat some drama that is going on in Haley's life and we kind of get a little bit of an opportunity to see what we really loved in the relationship between Haley and Luke. It's just kind of a little throwback and a little visit for our fans and for our wonderful following. It's a solution to a problem.

— Chad Michael Murray on Lucas' return, in an interview with E!.

Before the series was renewed, Mark Schwahn said that if they decide to air the ending for season eight that will satisfy as a series finale, he could introduce the unaired cliffhangers in the season nine premiere. In regard to her contract renewal, Sophia Bush tweeted, "The writers have GREAT plans!". The season will have Brooke and Haley balancing family life with running a busy Karen's Cafe, while Nathan travels more as an agent. A possible wedding may occur with Mouth and Millie, or Clay and Quinn. Lucas will take Lydia to stay with him after he comes to visit. The series finale will have another time jump and will see the characters lives five years in the future. Zap2it said that fans of Nathan and Haley's relationship can look forward to "plenty of shared scenes between Lafferty and Bethany Joy Lenz", despite his reduced role in the season. Nathan will be kidnapped during the season, and Haley and Dan will be searching for him.

According to a promotional video shown at the end of an evening of events—"An Evening with One Tree Hill"; the opening moments of the seasons first episode is narrated by Nathan. He speaks over scenes of a burning building whilst viewers also see Dan and Chris Keller seemingly plot a murder—in addition to this, opening shots include Chase in the back of a police car. Both Clay and Quinn are seen arguing alongside Brooke vandalising a rival cafe. Other scenes shown during the sequence include Julian being beaten up and Haley identifying a body in the morgue. Towards the end of the season, the Burning Boat Festival will return to Tree Hill. It was last seen in the third episode of season one.

Discussing the possibility of the death of one of the characters, Robert Buckley said: "The One Tree Hill family, as we know it, is going to change by season's end. The people we start the season with [are] not the same group we end it with." During the season, Mouth will gain around 60 pounds. Lee Norris has said of the storyline, "He's undergone a physical transformation... but what is really going to interest the audience is why this transformation happened." He also revealed he was "adamant" about handling the topic with respect, "I didn't want it to be one of the broader comedic things on the show; I wanted it to be an issue that people identify with," he said. Regarding Haley's direction for season nine, Bethany Joy Galeotti said, "Haley's trying to deal with having Dan around and deciding whether she's going to let this person back in her life and into her family's life. And Nathan is away, and that's taking a huge toll on their relationship. It's a lot about Haley finding out what her limits are." Mark Schwahn has said we'll see a lot of the strength of Nathan and Haley's relationship and why they're destined to be together. Regarding the friendship between Dan and Chris Keller he said, "villains understand villains." Chris Kellar will develop a "bromance" with Chase this season as they begin to spend a lot of time together as he will be working next door to TRIC. James Lafferty believes this is the worst year for Nathan, but revealed that he is happy with where he left the character and the pay-off at the end is worth it.

Sophia Bush revealed Tree Hill High would be seen again before the series ended. The sets for the school were re-built for the final episodes, with Bush describing walking in them as "incredibly emotional". Regarding the series finale, Bush said "it's perfect".

== Reception ==
The season premiered to 1.7 million viewers, a 0.9 Adults 18–49 rating, 1.2 in Adults 18–34 and a 1.8 rating in the CW's target of Women 18–34. It gave the network its best numbers in the time-slot since Spring, 2011 and was higher than the average for season eight of the series.

Compared to the early episodes of season eight, the season declined 18% in the 18–49 demographic. However, it tied as the second-highest rated show on the network (with The Secret Circle).

== DVD release ==
The "An Evening with One Tree Hill" event in Wilmington was filmed and will be included on the DVD release. Series stars Sophia Bush, Bethany Joy Lenz, Antwon Tanner and Lee Norris have done a DVD commentary for the series finale. The DVD box-set is currently scheduled for release on April 10, 2012. However, several people who pre-ordered the set received it in late March, before the finale aired, causing the finale to be leaked online including temporarily onto YouTube.

The box-set features over two hours of extra content, including five featurettes, audio commentary, unaired scenes and a gag reel. "Knowing this was to be our last year, we made sure to document it, which made for some excellent behind-the-scenes footage that we've included here, along with our last, explosive, emotional season of One Tree Hill," said Mark Schwahn.

The Complete Ninth and Final Season
Set details			Special features
13 episodes; 555 minutes (Region 1); 555 minutes (Region 2); 555 minutes (Region 4); 3-disc set; 1.78:1 aspect ratio; Languages: English (Dolby Digital 5.1); Subtitles: English, Spanish French (Region 1)			Audio commentaries; "One Tree Hill" – with creator/executive producer/writer Mark Schwahn.; Deleted scenes; Episodes: "Don't You Want to Share the Guilt?", "Last Known Surroundings", "Every Breath Is a Bomb", "Danny Boy"; Gag reel; "An Evening with One Tree Hill"; "The Story of One Tree Hill"; "The Music of One Tree Hill"; "The Fans of One Tree Hill"; "Crew Cameras with Sophia"
Release dates			Audio commentaries; "One Tree Hill" – with creator/executive producer/writer Mark Schwahn.; Deleted scenes; Episodes: "Don't You Want to Share the Guilt?", "Last Known Surroundings", "Every Breath Is a Bomb", "Danny Boy"; Gag reel; "An Evening with One Tree Hill"; "The Story of One Tree Hill"; "The Music of One Tree Hill"; "The Fans of One Tree Hill"; "Crew Cameras with Sophia"
United States	United Kingdom	Australia	Audio commentaries; "One Tree Hill" – with creator/executive producer/writer Mark Schwahn.; Deleted scenes; Episodes: "Don't You Want to Share the Guilt?", "Last Known Surroundings", "Every Breath Is a Bomb", "Danny Boy"; Gag reel; "An Evening with One Tree Hill"; "The Story of One Tree Hill"; "The Music of One Tree Hill"; "The Fans of One Tree Hill"; "Crew Cameras with Sophia"
April 10, 2012	June 11, 2012	September 5, 2012	Audio commentaries; "One Tree Hill" – with creator/executive producer/writer Mark Schwahn.; Deleted scenes; Episodes: "Don't You Want to Share the Guilt?", "Last Known Surroundings", "Every Breath Is a Bomb", "Danny Boy"; Gag reel; "An Evening with One Tree Hill"; "The Story of One Tree Hill"; "The Music of One Tree Hill"; "The Fans of One Tree Hill"; "Crew Cameras with Sophia"
