= Pilot (One Tree Hill) =

- One Tree Hill episode
- Lucas and Nathan during a basketball game, in the episode's climactic scene.
- Episode no.: Season 1 Episode 1
- Directed by: Bryan Gordon
- Written by: Mark Schwahn
- Cinematography by: Michael Grady; Billy Dickson
- Editing by: Les Butler
- Production code: 177500
- Original air date: September 23, 2003

Guest appearances
- Antwon Tanner as Antwon "Skills" Taylor; Bryan Greenberg as Jake Jagielski

Episode chronology
← Previous —	Next → "The Places You Have Come to Fear the Most"
- One Tree Hill season 1

"Pilot" is the first episode of One Tree Hill's first season. It first aired on the WB network in the United States on September 23, 2003. It was written by the show's creator, Mark Schwahn, and directed by Bryan Gordon. It introduces the character of Lucas Scott – a high school student – and his friends and relatives in the fictional town of Tree Hill, North Carolina.

== Plot ==
An important basketball game is going on at the fictional Tree Hill High School at the beginning of the series. The Ravens' team wins, thanks to Nathan Scott's final shot. Elsewhere, Lucas Scott is playing basketball with three friends. Nathan and Lucas share the same father, Dan Scott, but they live apart: it is suggested that Dan abandoned Lucas and his mother, Karen Roe, when Lucas was born, preferring to marry Deb Scott, with whom he had Nathan. Nathan and his team are busted for stealing a school bus. Even though Nathan was driving, his father, Dan, manages to bail him out of trouble, as usual, while other players are suspended.

During a drive, Nathan's girlfriend and Ravens’ cheerleader, Peyton Sawyer, nearly runs over Lucas after becoming distracted at the wheel. Lucas heads for Karen's café, where he has dinner with his mother and his best friend, Haley James. The next day, Keith Scott, Dan's elder brother who is close friends with Karen, asks Whitey Durham, the Ravens coach, to let Lucas be part of the team. Keith is positive that the kid deserves it. The coach tells Lucas he can join the Ravens. Nathan then challenges Lucas to a basketball match, with the stipulation that the loser will walk away from the team. Later, Peyton's car breaks down and Lucas comes to her assistance. During a discussion, Lucas relays his history with Dan and Nathan.

Lucas shows up at Keith's shop by the time Dan is talking to Keith about Karen. Following this, Lucas makes up his mind and accepts Nathan's challenge. After winning the game, Lucas lets Peyton know that Nathan has to stay on the team because "it's the last thing he wants". In the final scene of the pilot episode, Lucas enters the school's gym while everyone is staring at him. A last close-up to the park where Lucas used to play: it's finally empty.

== Production ==
One Tree Hill was first created to be a feature-length movie with the title Ravens. However, Mark Schwahn was convinced by fellow producer Joe Davola that it would be more interesting as a TV series. The series features an unaired pilot episode which takes place in the past. It tells the story of Karen and Dan and how she got pregnant. Then, after Dan marries Deb, it skips to the future where Lucas has his first day at Tree Hill High. He meets Mouth and others and realizes that maybe basketball is for him; that is, until he and Nathan get into a fight about Dan.

In the broadcast pilot episode, Brooke Davis (portrayed by Sophia Bush) does not appear and makes her first appearance in The Places You Have Come to Fear the Most as she was cast after the show was greenlit for a full season. Samantha Shelton also played a character called Reagan in the unaired pilot. She was replaced with the character Haley.

== Reception ==
In the U.S., the episode's initial broadcast attracted two and a half million viewers on The WB Television Network. The episode received generally mixed reviews. Critics compared it to The O.C. and Dawson's Creek, but with a more masculine appeal.
