= Catastrophe and the Cure =

Catastrophe and the Cure may refer to:

- "Catastrophe and the Cure" (Grey's Anatomy)
- "Catastrophe and the Cure" (One Tree Hill)
