= Lisa Goldstein (actress) =

American actress

- Born: Long Island, New York, U.S.
- Occupation: Actress
- Years active: 2007–2013
- Spouse: Brendan Kirsch (m. 2011)
- Children: 1

Lisa Goldstein is a retired American television, film and theatre actress. She is most known for her role as Millicent Huxtable on One Tree Hill.

== Personal life and education ==
Goldstein was born on Long Island and grew up in Hingham, Massachusetts, from age 9 after her family lived in London, Long Island (again), and Pennsylvania. Afterwards, Goldstein went to Elon University (Elon, NC) where she received her BFA in Music Theatre in 2003. She then interned at B Street Theatre in Sacramento, California.

Goldstein is married and lives in Florida with her husband sports coordinator; Brendan Kirsch. She met him on the set of One Tree Hill where he was basketball coordinator.

On January 5, 2014, Goldstein and her husband announced on Twitter that they were expecting their first child. On July 11, 2014, Goldstein gave birth to the couple's first child, a boy named Flynn Robert Kirsch.

== Career ==
After college, Goldstein worked at regional theaters in several musicals, including Smokey Joe's Cafe, Victor Victoria, and Anything Goes.

In early 2007, Goldstein signed a contract with Walt Disney World in Orlando, Florida where she played Belle in Beauty and the Beast – The Musical, and Nemo, Pearl and Squirt in Finding Nemo – The Musical.

In July 2007, Goldstein was cast in The CW's popular drama series One Tree Hill as Millicent Huxtable. She was cast only for the first episode of season five. However, after seeing her performance in that episode, the writers decided to bring her character back for the remainder of the season. In season six she became a regular and was on the show until the final season.

In early 2008, Goldstein portrayed Phil Chess's wife Sheva Chess, in the independent film Who Do You Love?. She also appeared in the music video for fellow One Tree Hill co-star Kate Voegele's song "Only Fooling Myself," which was directed by the show's creator and executive producer Mark Schwahn.

Goldstein's last acting credit was for the film Don't Know Yet before she left acting for good.

== Filmography ==
Year	Film	Role	Notes
2008–12	One Tree Hill	Millicent Huxtable	Recurring role (Season 5); Main cast (Seasons 6–9); 92 Episodes
2008	Who Do You Love?	Sheva Chess	
2013	Drop Dead Diva	Rachel McMann	Episode 5.10 "The Kiss"
2013	Don't Know Yet	Autumn	
