= Nathan Scott =

Fictional character from the television series One Tree Hill

- One Tree Hill character
- James Lafferty as Nathan Scott
- First appearance: "Pilot" (2003)
- Last appearance: "One Tree Hill" (2012)
- Created by: Mark Schwahn
- Portrayed by: James Lafferty

In-universe information
- Nickname: Little Brother (by Lucas); Married Guy (by Brooke); Nate, Hotshot, Boy Toy
- Occupation: Sports agent (for Fortitude); Former: Basketball coach (Tree Hill Ravens); Basketball player in the NBA (Point guard for the Charlotte Bobcats)
- Spouse: Haley James (wife; 2 children)
- Children: Jamie Lucas Scott (oldest son, with Haley); Lydia Bob Scott (younger daughter, with Haley)
- Relatives: Lucas Scott (half-brother); Peyton Sawyer (sister-in-law, via Lucas); Sawyer Brooke Scott (niece, via Lucas); Jimmy James (father-in-law; deceased); Lydia James (mother-in-law; deceased); Vivian James (sister-in-law); Taylor James (sister-in-law); Quinn Evans (sister-in-law); Clay Evans (brother-in-law)
- Home: Tree Hill, North Carolina

Nathan Royal Scott is a fictional character from the CW television series One Tree Hill created by Mark Schwahn and portrayed by James Lafferty. Following Lucas Scott's departure, Nathan became the main character and central figure of the show. Nathan is Lucas's younger half-brother. He fell in love with Lucas's best friend, Haley James; and they married at the end of the first season. Despite various problems in their relationship, the couple remains together married for most of the show's run, and had a son, Jamie, in season four and a daughter, Lydia, in season eight. Considered to be an anti-hero at the beginning of the first season, Nathan became a much friendlier and more caring person as the series progressed, due to his relationship with Haley and other characters.

== Character development ==
=== Casting and creation ===
The writers originally wanted Chad Michael Murray to play Nathan, but he chose to portray Lucas as his mother had abandoned him, which helped him relate to the character. James Lafferty was subsequently cast, as he was a talented basketball player.

=== Evolution ===
"It's really great. One of my favorite things about coming back for the seventh season is seeing what Nathan's life is like and what the Scott family's life is like after Nathan has been in the NBA."
—Lafferty on Nathan's new career path.

In the beginning, the character of "Nathan" was described as "cocky and an academically challenged high school junior". In an interview Lafferty mentioned his thoughts on Nathan and Haley's unlikely relationship, "I think, to start with, the likelihood of the situation, of Nathan and Haley coming together, was so small. In our first few episodes, the characters were worlds apart. It didn't seem like it would be a good fit. But sort of against all odds, they continued to make it work over the years and they fought through adversity. I think they've become a couple that you don't take for granted because they've been up against so much. So you root for them." "Nathan and Haley's fan base is so strong, and there's a reason for that. That couple is gold as far as I'm concerned, and I've felt that way since the very beginning", said Mark Schwahn on the couple. At the end of season three, James Lafferty has said he enjoys playing the rebellious Nathan, which he believes is due to his upbringing and having a father like Dan. He said it's a personality trait he can relate to from his own personality and it's fun to bring it through to Nathan.

Lafferty has said it has been gratifying to play a good family man. "There was definitely a time when Nathan was a villain on the show. I remember not really knowing what the future of the character was going to be, because it seems like on television shows in general, the villain doesn't usually stick around for that long. They're around for as long as it takes the hero to overcome him or defeat him. I was a little bit insecure about what my future on the show would be, but [series creator Mark] Schwahn sort of comforted me. I never could've imagined that it would come to this, that he would be so settled down, and sort of the one present character on the show that's been married for years and has these two children, and such a strong family unit. It's pretty cool to be able to see how far the character has come," said Lafferty regarding the development of Nathan. He also said that if the series wasn't picked up for a ninth season he was happy with how his character's story was wrapped up. Lafferty opted out of returning for the ninth, and final, season as a full-time cast member. Instead, he appeared in 7 out of the thirteen episodes picked up, but continued as a series regular. After some time of speculation, James Lafferty signed on for one extra episode, which was the series finale.

Lafferty has revealed that his favorite episode was "4 Years, 6 Months, 2 Days." He said, "When we came back four years later in the characters' lives and Nathan and Haley had Jamie, it was an exciting atmosphere not really knowing where my character would go. He was in such a dark place and not knowing how the family unit was going to stay together, and then also being able to work with Jackson for the first time — I'll always have fond memories of that."

== Reception ==
BuddyTV ranked him #12 in its list of the "15 TV's Hottest Dads" but was described as not the best father for initially ignoring his family after his accident, though he does redeem himself afterwards.

== See also ==
- List of fictional supercouples
- Quotes
