= Peyton Sawyer =

Fictional character from the One Tree Hill television series

- One Tree Hill character
- Hilarie Burton as Peyton Sawyer
- First appearance: "Pilot" (2003)
- Last appearance: "Remember Me as a Time of Day" (2009)
- Created by: Mark Schwahn
- Portrayed by: Hilarie Burton

In-universe information
- Full name: Peyton Elizabeth Sawyer (maiden name); Peyton Elizabeth Scott (married name)
- Aliases: P. Sawyer (by Brooke); Peyton Sawyer Scott
- Nicknames: Peyton Marie Sawyer (by Brooke); Curly, Peyt, Goldilocks, Skinny Girl, Sawyer, PS
- Occupation: Record label founder and owner (Red Bedroom Records)
- Family: Mick Wolf (biological father); Ellie Harp (biological mother; deceased); Larry Sawyer (adoptive father); Anna Sawyer (adoptive mother; deceased); Derek Sommers (biological paternal half-brother)
- Spouses: Lucas Scott (husband)
- Children: Sawyer Brooke Scott (daughter)
- Relatives: Dan Scott (father-in-law; deceased); Karen Roe (mother-in-law); Nathan Scott (brother-in-law); Lily Roe Scott (sister-in-law); James "Jamie" Scott (nephew); Lydia Scott (niece); Haley James Scott (sister-in-law); Keith Scott (uncle-in-law; deceased)

Peyton Elizabeth Sawyer is a fictional character from The WB/CW television series One Tree Hill and one of the female leads, portrayed by Hilarie Burton. A talented visual and musical artist, Peyton has a heavily guarded heart due to the number of lost loved ones in her life and, over the course of the series, she goes through a lot of life-changing events, difficult times and challenges. One of her character’s cores is her everlasting and complicated love story with the main male protagonist, Lucas Scott. She also shares a special bond with Brooke Davis, her best friend since childhood, and becomes close friends with Haley James too.

Wilmington Star described the character as having "blown away every stereotype the media has placed on cheerleaders", while PopMatters referred to her as "a walking contradiction."

== Character development ==
=== Casting ===
Burton was one of the more prominent VJs on MTV for two years, with her looks and other onscreen activities acting as assets. She was the host of her own show, MTV's Hits, helped launch the network's Beach House from the New Jersey shore in May 2002 and was a regular on TRL. Her MTV VJ job allowed her to pursue other media career opportunities, and eventually led to her being cast as Peyton. Burton, who favored acting as a career, auditioned for the part of Ed Harris's daughter in the film Radio. She was encouraged by subsequent callbacks, but did not land the role. The casting department, however, remembered her and asked her to send an audition tape for One Tree Hill, and producers promised her a character that she "could sink her teeth into" – Peyton. "[Burton] is an old soul," said Mark Schwahn, the series' creator. "She's great. She's always just thrilled to do the job, even though she's kind of new to acting. She's just a joy to be around."

Burton said, "I've never studied acting or anything because I've been so lucky with MTV. I'm convinced I got the chance to be on One Tree Hill because I did a guest thing on Dawson's Creek as myself, when the cast appeared at the MTV Beach House." She added, "And my only scene was with Chad Michael Murray (Lucas Scott). So, now The Chad and I are reunited. How bizarre is that?" With regard to what her life is like as an actress, Burton said, "Actors like to think their lives are very difficult, but they're not. Yeah, you're running around a lot. But I used to work in a supermarket and in a bar. That was hard. This is fun."

=== Personality and wardrobe ===
Peyton has been described as beautiful, smart, fiercely independent, and as someone who is often a victim on the series. "My character is a good girl, but she is also kind of [sexually] suggestive. This is definitely not your mom's drama," said Burton. "She's very contradictory. Yes, she is a cheerleader, but she also goes home and listens to punk music. She's into really dark art and probably rips the heads off of Barbie dolls. Basically, she's a train wreck." Burton said the character may be "a train wreck" but that she was "so glad [that someone was] putting a girl like her on TV. You don't have to be one thing. Peyton has made that OK".

Peyton's hair and wardrobe evolution: Her seasons 1 and 2 curly hair, along with vintage clothing style (bottom left), season 3 shorter hair style (top left), season 5 sexier dress style (top right), and season 6 straight hair style (bottom right).

Burton said she herself was torn between cheerleading and hobbies which would not necessarily be considered hobbies of a cheerleader while in high school. "That's part of the reason I took the show, because I was like, holy cow, this was me in high school." Burton said there are always stereotypes in high school. "People get put into groups. "You're a jock, you're a cheerleader, you're a freak, you're in the drama department. I had a lot of trouble fitting into those groups when I was in high school because I wanted to be a part of all of them," she said. "I think that's how a lot of people are. Some people have the nerve to go ahead and branch out and be a part of everything and some people don't." She said One Tree Hill represents people who are multidimensional and who like more than one thing. "People do like more than one thing. It's nice that [One Tree Hill] shows that," she stated.

Burton said that portraying a younger age (16 at 21) was not a problem, except for one aspect: "My only concern was when I had to put on my cheerleading uniform again. You forget how nerve-racking that is – the vulnerability of wearing bloomers." She said she reread some of her journals from high school to get "into that place" as a high school student again, and that Peyton being similar to how she was in high school helped. "It also helped that the town where we film, Wilmington, isn't too different from the hometown where I grew up in Virginia. Both [are] small towns where high school sports played a big part," she stated.

Initially, the character was mixed-received: she came off as too angry and bitchy to some viewers. "At first, the audience rejected her character because, well, she was mean to our hero (Lucas)," said Schwann. "And she's pretty and popular." Burton stated, "She was catching a lot of flack. [People were saying], 'Oh, she's this cheerleader. She's like, you know, this cute little girl. She wants to be all hard and angry.'" Schwann decided to soften the character a little, which included having her bond with character Haley James, Lucas's best friend, and she eventually caught on with the audience. "[That was] our challenge, because she [was designed as, and became] the moral center of the show," said Schwahn.

The character's wardrobe originally encompassed a rocker yet feminine look. She would drive around in a vintage car, listening to loud rock, often wearing a Ramones T-shirt. "[Burton] – I just love her. Working with her (has) been wonderful. For her, [Peyton's] more of the do-it-yourself girl. She's so into music, art, she's such a rich character that there are a lot of different things to draw on," stated One Tree Hill's costume designer, Carol Cutshall. "Sometimes she'll just be in a plaid flannel shirt because she's painting. Some days she'll be in a concert T-shirt. We have to find the right concert T-shirt. I do alter them a lot." Cutshall would take a men's concert T-shirt, and have Burton put it on. "She's also very, very slender, so I'll taper them down to her figure. We come out of it with kind of a one-o-f-a-kind rock T-shirt. I take something and then turn it into my own piece of clothing," said Cutshall. Peyton's main brands have been Cheap Monday, Levi's, some Diesel and Miss Sixty.

Schwahn eventually began to change the character's styles, especially in season 4 and up. Burton said, "Peyton's wardrobe has changed quite a bit, which is nice for me, because I am a... In real-life I am [several years older], and was wearing T-shirts and jeans, and Converse sneakers for five years." She said that after some time, it weighed on her femininity. With the four-year timeline jump, Peyton got to wear more skirts and dresses, and shorter ones. "Boobs aren't bigger, but legs are out," said Burton.

Schwahn had Peyton's personality complement Lucas's, and described their love story as a soulmate/meant to be one. Burton explained her character's attraction to Lucas, saying she sees Peyton as questioning a lot about her life, similar to how Murray envisions Lucas, and thinks Peyton often differs from her friends on what is important – much like Murray has said he felt as a child.

==== Artwork ====
Various Peyton artwork.

Peyton was further designed as an artist, in order to add more depth to the character and express what she cannot or does not want to say. It also complemented her romance with Lucas, as both are deep thinkers who use their skills to speak to the world. The actual artist of Peyton's works is Helen Ward. "Before joining [One Tree Hill], I had already worked as a set designer, storyboard artist and illustrator for a number of films. But I still had to try out for the job," she said. "I think they asked a bunch of people to give their shot at a particular drawing. They were pretty specific about what they were looking for. I guess my work was closest. I got the job."

Ward said that although Burton is a talented actress and has done a great job with the character, she did not feel she had to get to know her in order to proceed with the drawings. "It was the character I was drawing for and I learned what I needed to from the show and the scripts," she stated. In describing the process of drawing for a particular episode, she said she would mostly get input from Robbie Beck, the props master for the show. "Schwahn always knew exactly what he wanted and it would be described in the script. So Robbie would send me the info and I would initially do some quick sketches," stated Ward. All of their communication was via e-mail. "I wish I could say something more exciting, like [Burton] and I would chat about what Peyton would be drawing," stated Ward, "but the only time I ever spoke with her was when they were filming at my house in Wilmington (which oddly enough was Peyton's house on the show.)" Despite this, Ward said she did not mention to Burton that she was the artist behind Peyton's artwork.

For scenes where Peyton is drawing or painting, Ward stated, "...there would likely be very light lines for her to follow. Often I would give a finished version and an unfinished for this purpose. If I remember correctly, it was usually the words that I left undone." Regarding the evolution of Peyton's artwork over the years, she said, "I look back at the first season and think the drawings are awful! I certainly became more comfortable working in her style, but I think her style also evolved to fit mine. Does that make sense?" Ward clarified, "Initially I was trying to do something that just didn't flow well from me. The drawings were too clean. A little forced and not at all the way I liked to work." Ward said that as the show progressed, she began to put more of my own style in them, and became more comfortable and the work got better. In Season 3, the artwork was promoted through the album Friends with Benefit. In Season 6, it is seen in color instead of in black and white, to reflect the character's happiness.

Regarding most people not knowing she is the actual artist of the artwork, Ward stated that although people generally do not concern themselves with the workers behind the scenes, she believes this is how things should be, and that she is appreciative of those who have related to her artwork.

== Storylines ==
=== Overview ===
Peyton Elizabeth is the only child of Larry and Anna Sawyer, she was adopted at birth; the true parentage and other family ties are not discovered until seasons 2, 3, 4, and 6. Peyton's second name in fact, was given to her by her adoptive parents in honor of her biological mother: Elizabeth "Ellie" Harp.

Her biological father's name is Mick Wolf, and Peyton also has a biological half-brother by him, named: Derek Sommers. When Peyton is 8, her adoptive mother (at the time known to her as her birth mother), Anna Sawyer, dies by running a red light on her way to pick her up from school. She soon forges a powerful friendship with Brooke Davis, who comforts her over Anna's death, and they become best friends.

As the show begins, Peyton's boyfriend is Nathan Scott. She soon breaks up with him and falls in love with Nathan's rival and half-brother, Lucas Scott. Peyton drives a 1963 Mercury Comet convertible, which becomes a major plot point as it is because of it that she first speaks to Lucas: from that moment, her car will become a central theme in their love story.

=== Early seasons ===
During the first season, 16-year-old Peyton Elizabeth Sawyer is girlfriend to popular jock/star basketball player Nathan, but they soon break up when Peyton reasons that their relationship is more about sexual benefits than love, and that she is tired of his cruelty. In addition, she realizes that she no longer wants to be the star basketball player's girlfriend. She immediately becomes interested in her ex's brooding half brother, Lucas, thanks to his goodness and being very kindred: in fact, through various interactions with Lucas, she finds that he is kind and thoughtful towards her. However, when he confesses the depths of his feelings for her, she becomes scared and runs from him, leaving him heartbroken and desperate. Peyton later goes to visit Lucas and professes that she wants to be with him too, but it is too late: Brooke, her best friend, has now become romantically involved with him. Lucas and Peyton eventually cannot resist each other, and become secret lovers (though no sex is involved). On the night that they decide to tell Brooke, Lucas gets into a car accident and subsequently goes into a coma, which brings back painful memories for Peyton because her mother died in a car crash. When Lucas finally comes home from the hospital, he breaks up with Brooke in order to be with Peyton, who soon ends things with him, however, despite loving him out of guilt for betraying her best friend, who, in the meantime, finds out about them and is enraged. Peyton continues to avoid Lucas while Brooke continues to avoid Peyton as Brooke declares her friendship with Peyton to be over. Then, Peyton begins spending more time with Lucas' best friend, Haley James, and with Jake Jagielski, along with Jake's daughter, Jenny. Eventually, her friendship with Lucas is slowly reformed, and the two attend a party together at Nathan's apartment. However, at the party, Peyton and Nicki, Jake's ex and Jenny's mother, fight and Peyton realizes Nicki is the girl Lucas hooked up with at a bar, shortly after she dumped him to spare Brooke's pain. Peyton is furious and feels betrayed, along with Brooke. This drives a wedge between Lucas and Peyton, but reconciles the friendship between Peyton and Brooke. The season ends with Peyton spending more time with Jake, and helping him escape from Nicki, who tries to take their daughter from Jake's grasp. Peyton's relationship with Lucas remains broken.

In season 2, although she has initial success with getting the all-ages club TRIC opened, and with encouraging Haley to perform at the club, which eventually fuels Haley's desire to be a singer, Peyton begins to get involved with cocaine. She feels alone, as her father is away again, and she does not know where Jake is. She feels down that everyone is dealing with their issues and not helping her or realizing that she is upset and going through a difficult time in her life. She is accused of being a lesbian by Felix Taggaro and faces public humiliation when he writes DYKE on her locker, just so his sister, Anna Taggaro, will not be presumed a lesbian (it is later revealed that Anna is bisexual, but also uses the word gay to assert her sexuality). Hope comes for Peyton, who is in deep despair and about to buy some cocaine, when Jake comes back into her life. In fact, it turns out that an argument between Lucas and Peyton made him realize that he had not been there for Peyton, and felt she needed someone else because, after the events of the previous season, the two weren’t able to reconcile, leaving both of them suffering for the situation, and, as a result, he was the one who called Jake, knowing that he would have a positive effect on her. This does, and sparks a turnaround for Peyton, and she and Jake begin a relationship. This happiness is although short-lived, as Nicki comes back wanting custody of Jenny. Nicki eventually takes Jenny away from Jake and runs off, causing Jake to follow her, leaving Peyton alone and heartbroken again. Soon, someone named Ellie Harp gets in contact with Peyton saying that she is from Alternative Press magazine and wants to do an interview. When Peyton starts receiving strange e-mails from someone named WATCHMEWATCHU, she begins to suspect that it is Ellie. Ellie, however, denies sending the e-mails and shockingly informs Peyton that she is her biological mother. The finale ends with a crying, bewildered Peyton on a beach and Lucas coming to comfort her. "Looks like it's just me and you this summer," he says. The two share a meaningful hug and finally make amends once and for all.

In season 3, Lucas and Peyton have spent the whole summer together, growing closer again and forming a great friendship by hanging out, sharing mutual secrets and intimate things and making their bond stronger than it has ever been while Peyton has learnt from her father that she was adopted and that Ellie really is her biological mother. Lucas witnesses Ellie purchasing drugs, but he learns that she was buying them for medical reasons because she has breast cancer. Meanwhile, Peyton is angry with Haley because she left Tree Hill to go on tour, but soon they make amends, and Peyton reveals that her hostility towards Haley was because she was the only one that came back out of all the people who have left her. Peyton soon grows close to Ellie, and they collaborate on a CD called Friends with Benefit, which benefits breast cancer research; there will also be a concert for it at TRIC and Haley is one of the performers. Ellie dies before she sees the CD or the concert, leaving Peyton devastated. Before dying, Ellie leaves a piece of advice for Peyton regarding her love life: in fact, when Peyton talks about how she loved Lucas and let him go, but she started thinking she made a big and irreversible mistake, Ellie tells her it’s never too late. Then, tragedy happens: a school shooting breaks out later in the season ("With Tired Eyes, Tired Minds, Tired Souls, We Slept"), where Peyton is left fighting for her life after being hit by a stray round. Lucas and Nathan run inside the building to save Peyton and Haley respectively: Lucas finds Peyton bleeding from a wound in her leg inside the school's library. She cannot walk due to the injury, so escaping is out of the question. Lucas and Peyton stay in hiding and Lucas wraps her leg, hoping to help the bleeding and pain subside. As Peyton is lapsing in and out of consciousness, he forces her to talk about a fun day she once had. Minutes later, after receiving a promise from Lucas that everything will be okay and he will get her out alive, Peyton loses hope of surviving and kisses Lucas, wanting to let him know that she loves him before she dies. Lucas, relieved and touched to hear that, returns the kiss and Peyton soon falls unconscious. Lucas, desperate to save her, carries her out of the building, even at the risk of being killed by the shooter. Then, Peyton decides to distract herself from the past traumatic events by having a fling with Pete Wentz from Fall Out Boy. Their relationship does not work out, since Pete is busy with touring and way older than her, so Peyton's father tells her to follow her heart and listen to it and Peyton, considering Ellie's advice as well, decides to give Jake a visit in Savannah, rekindling her relationship with him and Jenny and even goes so far as to propose marriage to him, who gladly accepts: she feels safe with him and thinks it could be enough to be happy. However, Jake overhears Peyton saying "I love you, Lucas" in her sleep. Peyton is then forced to tell Jake about what happened between her and Lucas on the day of the shooting. So, Jake figures that Peyton is still in love with Lucas, but is running away from her feelings because he's dating Brooke again: he tells her to go back to Tree Hill and to find out if Lucas is the one for her and, if he is not, Jake promises to still be there, waiting. Peyton does as Jake has advised and, once back in Tree Hill, she definitely realizes she is still in love with Lucas and he is the one for her, no matter what, deciding to be honest and to tell Brooke the truth: in the finale, Brooke once again ends their friendship because of this confession. Lucas later tells Brooke about the kiss in the library and the two enter into a huge fight, which in turn causes them to definitely question their whole relationship, remaining at odds with each other. Meanwhile, Peyton is now determined not to give up on her love for Lucas anymore.

At the beginning of season 4, we see Peyton burning some pictures of herself with Brooke. Then, she picks up one of herself, Brooke and Lucas, rips out the central part where Brooke is, burns it and puts herself and Lucas next to each other. Peyton then discovers that she has a half-brother named Derek. With prompting from Lucas, she agrees to meet with him. However, unknown to Peyton and everyone else, the person she meets is not her half-brother but rather an Internet stalker who is the owner of the WATCHMEWATCHU emails and has been taking pictures of her, listening to her podcast, watching her on her webcam, and even going so far as to get a tattoo of Ellie's drawing of her on his back, and making a prostitute dress like Peyton before they have sex. Unaware of all this, and in an attempt to be more trusting, Peyton accepts him. Lucas, on the other hand, soon grows suspicious of 'Derek' when he catches him sniffing Peyton's hair during a hug and finds Peyton's jacket, which had gone missing, on the beaten prostitute still dressed as Peyton. Peyton soon realizes the truth, and, in a terrifying encounter, is manhandled and nearly raped by Psycho Derek. Lucas and the real Derek come to her rescue, pushing him out a window; by the time the police show up, he has disappeared. This series of events causes Peyton to withdraw from society, becoming scared and even skipping school and getting four locks on her bedroom door. Derek, who is in the Marine Corps and is unwilling to care too deeply due to having watched too many loved ones die, avoids Peyton until Lucas comes and talks to him about her. He and Peyton develop a healthy sibling relationship and he helps her come to terms with her fear, not only of Derek but of confessing her feelings to Lucas. Peyton is unwilling to ruin the friendship that she and Lucas have, especially until she is sure that he and Brooke are over. At Derek's encouragement, she asks Lucas to a banquet to honor Whitey, only to find out he is going with Brooke. Disappointed, she takes Derek instead. Derek tells her that he is being deployed to Iraq. That night, Lucas comes over to Peyton's to tell her that it is finally and definitely over between him and Brooke. She immediately confesses that she is in love with him, to which Lucas is left speechless because he was totally unprepared to such a declaration from her. It is not until after winning the State Championship that Lucas realizes that it has always been Peyton the one for him and the girl he wants by his side when all his dreams come true and tells her with his iconic “It’s you” speech, after which the two share a long-awaited kiss. Lucas declares Peyton his girlfriend, but their happiness is short-lived when Lucas has a heart attack that same night and almost dies. Peyton fears she will lose him like she has lost everyone else. However, Lucas "comes back to the living" for Peyton, and to tell her he loves her. She and Lucas soon decide to just be happy. They decide to make love, for the first time, during a party in the room where Peyton first rejected him, but they are interrupted when Peyton hears everyone cat-calling at what she thinks is a sex tape of her and Nathan. When Lucas and Peyton rush out to put an end to the tape, they, and everyone else, discover that it is in fact, of Nathan and Brooke. Peyton is enraged at Brooke and punches her, giving her a black eye. Later, while at home, Peyton yells at Brooke that she did not ruin their friendship; Brooke ruined it a long time ago. Following this, Peyton decides to skip prom, but gets convinced not to do so by Lucas. As she walks to her door to answer it (thinking it is Lucas), the man behind the door turns around and it is actually her stalker, Psycho Derek. He ties her up and gags her in her basement and proceeds to make a mock prom for them; he takes pictures of the bound and gagged Peyton, dancing with her and telling her they are gonna "go upstairs and have the perfect prom night". Brooke arrives, knowing that Peyton would never skip prom. Psycho Derek tries to kill Brooke, but Peyton and Brooke eventually overpower him and he ends up in jail. This experience repairs Peyton's and Brooke's friendship. Peyton learns that Psycho Derek's real name is Ian Banks. She forgives him after discovering disturbing facts about his past, and tells him that she hopes he finds peace. Lucas and Peyton eventually make love together for the first time at Honey Grove Prom. After making sure it is ok for Lucas, Peyton decides to take an internship in L.A., but the two decide to go long distance, and then they graduate, ending high school together on a high note. She also spends the whole summer with Brooke.

=== Missing years ===
One year after season 4, Peyton is surprised by Lucas when he comes to LA to propose to her. Feeling it is too soon, she says "someday", unknowingly setting their breakup in motion. One year later, Lucas's novel becomes a bestseller and he is scheduled to have a book signing in L.A. Having missed her, he calls her and invites her to come to the signing. Peyton comes, but witnesses Lindsey Strauss giving Lucas a congratulatory kiss, assumes that Lindsey and Lucas are in a relationship, and leaves thinking there is no hope for her and Lucas to be together. Lucas thinks Peyton did not bother to come to the book signing, and consequently goes on his first date with Lindsey the same night and some time later begins dating her, despite his surviving feelings for Peyton. Peyton then runs into Julian Baker, whom she had met for the first time the day after her breakup with Lucas. They talk and he invites her to a work party he has to attend that night. She and Julian date for a while afterwards, to the point where she moves in with him and they profess their love for each other, but he ends it after realizing that she will never get over Lucas.

=== Final seasons ===
In season 5, it has been almost five years later since high school graduation. Peyton, now 22, works as the assistant to the assistant in a recording company in LA, as her boss likes to remind her. Unable to make it in the music business and fearing to lose her integrity, she decides to quit and goes back to Tree Hill with her old best friend, Brooke Davis, and soon moves in with her. Her reunion with Lucas turns out to not be what she wished for, as he has a new girlfriend, Lindsey. She still loves Lucas, but temporarily puts those feelings aside to force Nathan to come to terms with what he has become after his injury. Finally feeling at home, and with the moral help from Lucas and the financial wealth of Brooke, she starts her own label at TRIC. She recruits her first band, led by a man named Jason. Things get rocky, and Haley convinces her to fire him and keep Mia, the keyboard player, as Mia is the true heart of the group. Peyton also struggles with her feelings towards Lucas, especially since his girlfriend tries to be nice to her. However, Peyton soon antagonizes her. After visiting her old house and remembering how she thought she would always be with Lucas, she becomes bitter. This then escalates into a fight with him as he confronts her about not being the same Peyton he used to know; she retorts that he gave up on the two of them not waiting for her. She later reveals to Lucas that she came back to Tree Hill for him and that she still loves him. She kisses him, and he kisses back but when she goes to his house, she finds out he has just proposed to Lindsey because of his fear of being rejected again by her. After the initial shock, she tells him that if it is what he really wants, she will bury her feelings for him because she wants him to be happy. However, she later winds up lashing out at Lindsey. She regrets her hostile remarks toward Lindsey when she discovers Lindsey's dad died from cancer, which prompts the two to start from a clean slate regarding their interaction. Peyton tricks her former boss into helping her launch Mia under her label. On Lucas and Lindsey's wedding day, Peyton puts on a brave face while watching Lucas saying "I do" to Lindsey. Although the wedding ends up falling apart because it has become crystal clear to Lindsey either that he hasn’t moved on from Peyton due to his second book, which is obviously again dedicated to Peyton and about his everlasting for her, she is still hurt because Lucas went through with his wedding vows. She then focuses on making Haley's new album and helping Brooke with baby Angie. Feeling guilty, she tries to have Lindsey reconcile with Lucas, but Lindsey tells her to read his new book, which she says is about her. One night, Peyton finds Lucas drunk at TRIC. She gets him home, where he utters that he hates her. Distraught, she starts to spend her time throwing water balloons on people as a form of therapy and later paints "Love song" from The Cure on the Rivercourt to tell Lucas that she will always be in love with him. Having seen this and being hardly confronted by Haley about his late behavior, he goes to Peyton to apologize for saying that he hates her because it’s obviously not true, but it was just the drink talking, and he says that it was really hard losing her, letting her go and seeing her again and it’s still really hard for him, making again apparent his everlasting love for her. During this time, Peyton gets word from Mia about a man who claims to have known Peyton's biological mother, Ellie. From the information given, this man could possibly be her biological father. At the end of the season finale, Lucas calls a woman asking her if she wants to get married at Las Vegas - the woman could be Lindsey, Peyton or Brooke.

In the season 6 premiere, it is discovered that the person whom Lucas called is obviously Peyton. She goes to the airport and they hop on a plane to Vegas to get married. Once they get there, the chapel is too trashy, and so they do not get married. Instead, they drive to L.A. and Lucas proposes to her in the same hotel room he did years before and finally become engaged. The two are still in L.A. during Brooke's attack. After Brooke calls Peyton and sounds weird, Lucas and Peyton decide to head back to Tree Hill and have the wedding there instead, but Lucas asks Peyton to move in with him in his house and she happily accepts. Peyton sees that Brooke is beaten up, but Brooke lies and says she fell down the stairs, and Peyton believes her, not knowing that Brooke was attacked. Peyton meets a famous musician named Mick Wolf, who used to know Ellie. He is the one who asked Mia about Peyton during the tour. He keeps dodging around the subject of Peyton's real father, but says a little more about him each time Peyton brings him up. Peyton continues to get to know Mick and continues to ask about her real father. When she asks him why her parents gave her up and, he replies, "We... I mean they, had a tough decision." Mick accidentally lets the truth slip out, and suddenly Peyton realizes this is her father. She invites him over for a nice dinner together, he instead goes and gets drunk at a bar after being sober for a year (as shown by a sobriety chip in his pocket). She and Lucas have also set a date for their wedding, which causes conflict between Lucas and Lindsey with regards to the book tour for his second book. Peyton closes herself off emotionally with regard to Mick and is angry with him for not being upfront with her about who he is. She tells him to leave. Not long afterward, during a visit to Brooke's, Brooke tells Peyton the truth about how she got all the bruises on her body and the two share a meaningful moment, reconnecting. Peyton is later seen on the phone with Larry, her adoptive father. She tells him how much she loves him. Though the cohabitation is initially hard, Lucas and Peyton eventually decide to accept their difference and go throw them while their relationship continues to grow stronger and stronger. Peyton also reconnects with her biological brother Derek, who has returned from the war. Later, she goes to TRIC to meet up with Lucas and a man named Julian, who is interested in making a movie based on Lucas's first novel. Julian was asking Lucas a lot of questions about Peyton before she got there. She runs into Julian near the bathroom, and it is soon revealed that he is her ex-boyfriend. Three weeks go by and Peyton still has not told Lucas the truth about her romantic history with Julian. Lucas is left to discover their past on his own, and is initially angry about it. Peyton throws a USO concert in which Angels and Airwaves, Mia, and Haley play. She continues to connect with her brother, Derek, and clash with Julian over Lucas and his film. Mia visits Peyton, and Peyton is concerned that Mia is not focused on her work. She suggests to Mia that she listen to a CD of songs she could possibly sing. They clash because Mia writes all of her own songs. Eventually, Peyton gives up on Mia and asks her to leave the label. Meanwhile, Peyton deals with stomach pains. She sees a doctor about it, and tells the doctor about Ellie's cancer. Her tearful face after the phone call predicts trouble ahead. Peyton later finds out that she does not have cancer, but is actually pregnant. She tells Lucas first and he is very happy and then Haley finds out in her own time, but Peyton seems hesitant to share her news with Brooke because she knows how much Brooke has wanted a family. Peyton eventually tells Brooke, and Brooke is really happy for her. Peyton has her first ultrasound, but is upset because she thinks that Lucas is too busy to come and has forgotten. Lucas surprises her by coming, and the two get to hear their baby's heartbeat for the first time happier than they’ve ever been. Later, Lucas and Peyton learn that Peyton has placenta praevia and that having this baby could mean the end of her life. Lucas, afraid of losing her and raising a child that has to go through the same motherless state Peyton did, tries to convince her into an abortion, but they decide to get through this and decide to have the baby. After she asked him to marry sooner, Lucas tells her that he wants to do it, but not because she might die beforehand, but because he loves her with all his heart, and wants her to be his wife. Lucas and Peyton get married at the lake where they met. Haley is the minister, Brooke is Peyton’s maid of honor and Nathan is Lucas’s best man. After the reception, Lucas and Peyton go home and Peyton collapses on the floor while waiting for Lucas's surprise. Lucas walks in the house and finds Peyton unconscious on the floor in a pool of blood. Peyton is rushed to the hospital by a blood-covered Lucas, who begs her not to leave him. Peyton goes through an emergency caesarean section, and falls into a coma. The caesarean section is successful and she gives birth to a daughter named Sawyer Brooke Scott. She later awakes with Lucas and Brooke by her side. Karen, who has come back to Tree Hill for the occasion, brings in Sawyer, and Nathan, Haley, Jamie and Julian join them. Dan visits Peyton and she, after some hesitation, allows Dan to hold Sawyer. She and Lucas then leave Tree Hill with Sawyer finally leaving happily ever after.

For season 7, Mark Schwahn, the series' creator, said Lucas and Peyton are traveling the world; they are spending time with Karen and her husband Andy, and Lucas is writing a new book. They continue to be mentioned by characters on the series. Her and Lucas' absence during Brooke and Julian's wedding is mentioned by Brooke as being due to baby Sawyer being sick. Haley takes her place as Brooke's maid of honor. In season nine, Haley sends Jamie and Lydia to live with Peyton and Lucas due to Nathan's disappearance.

== Reception ==
Peyton has been described as "a very talented artist" who expresses her emotions through her work and guards her heart after losing so many important people in her life. The character was initially mixed-received, as the audience felt that she was too mean, especially to love interest Lucas. Tracy McLoone of PopMatters stated, "Perpetually cranky Peyton tears around town in a vintage car, listening to loud rock, and wearing a Ramones T-shirt, none of which fits with a typical cheerleader image." McLoone added, "At one point, Lucas asks her why she's a cheerleader, noting that she's 'the least cheery person I know. She responds, 'You don't know me.' [And in fact], she's right. The girl is a walking contradiction. Peyton embodies aspects of the good girl (cheerleader) and bad girl (rocker)." The character's crankiness was eventually toned down, as she was revealed to have a deeper side and her interaction with Lucas and Haley started to win over viewers. The Wilmington Star credits the character with "[blowing] away every stereotype" the media has placed on cheerleaders: "She's—gasp—smart! And interesting! And so not the pop-tart cheerleader TV often delivers," stated Allison Ballard of the newspaper.

Her love story with Lucas also became very popular. MTV described the two as the generation's Joey and Pacey, "the overly dramatic couple you could not help but root for", and the pairing emerged as one of the show's supercouples. Their departure received significant media attention and was even picked as one of the "12 most essential episodes" of One Tree Hill in 2009 by fans at starnewsonline.com.

== See also ==
- List of fictional supercouples
- Quotes
