= Lucas Scott =

- One Tree Hill character
- Chad Michael Murray as Lucas Scott
- First appearance: "Pilot" (2003)
- Last appearance: "Last Known Surroundings" (2012)
- Created by: Mark Schwahn
- Portrayed by: Chad Michael Murray

In-universe information
- Full name: Lucas Eugene Scott
- Nickname: Luke
- Occupation: Author; Basketball coach (former)
- Family: Karen Roe (mother); Dan Scott (father; deceased); Keith Scott (uncle; deceased); Nathan Scott (paternal half brother); Lily Roe Scott (maternal half sister, cousin); Jamie Scott (nephew); Lydia Scott (niece)
- Spouses: Peyton Sawyer (wife)
- Children: Sawyer Brooke Scott (daughter)
- Relatives: Deb Scott (former stepmother); Andy Hargrove (honorary stepfather); Larry Sawyer (father-in-law); Anna Sawyer (mother-in-law; deceased); Haley James Scott (sister-in-law, via Nathan); Derek Sommers (brother-in-law, via Peyton)

Lucas Eugene Scott is a fictional character and the main protagonist from The WB/CW television series One Tree Hill created by Mark Schwahn and portrayed by Chad Michael Murray. Lucas is a talented basketball player and writer and the paternal half-brother of Nathan Scott. The relationship between the two of them is one of the show’s foundations: from being initially estranged and rivals, their dynamic gradually shifts over the course of the series as they set their differences aside and their bond becomes increasingly stronger, turning them into true companions and best friends first and then growing to the point that they eventually begin to truly consider themselves brothers. While striving for his dreams, Lucas also has to deal with his tumultuous relationship with his father, Dan Scott, and is initially the centre of a love triangle designed between him and female leads Peyton Sawyer, whom he’s actually loved since childhood, and Brooke Davis. Ultimately, Peyton turns out to be the one for him, while the relationship between the two of them has become another cornerstone of the show. Haley James, the third female lead and Nathan’s eventual wife, is his best friend since childhood.

The character has been described as popular among teenagers and young adults, not only for his skill at basketball but for his romantic aspirations. Specifically regarding the character's impact on female viewers, Entertainment Weekly stated that his soulful eyes contributed to the show's success.

== Character development ==
=== Casting ===
Chad Michael Murray was the first person to be cast for One Tree Hill. The producers were originally unsure as to who Murray would play. Series creator Mark Schwahn wanted him to play the character of Nathan Scott since Murray had played a bad guy several times before, and he felt it was only natural to give him this role. Murray, however, wanted to portray Lucas due to a connection he felt with the character. He felt that he could inhabit the character as the two share several similarities. Murray's mother left him when he was young, and Lucas was abandoned by his father. Murray's passion for the role led the producers to cast him as Lucas. Murray had turned down the lead role of Ryan Atwood in The O.C. to accept the role as Lucas Scott.

=== Personality and wardrobe ===
Schwahn said that in designing the show, he created Lucas as "this underdog kid from the wrong side of the tracks" who crosses over to the pretty and popular; he wanted to show what the life of such a person would be like in a basketball atmosphere.

For Murray, in addition to their shared abandonment issues, Lucas's love for literature also appealed to him. Murray had become a fan of the medium during high school, and felt it changed his way of seeing things; it made him rethink his own actions. Lucas has been described as "caught between being charming and a nerd, a hermit and confident". Murray said of the character, "He's very introverted." He described Lucas as an observer, someone who likes to watch people and try to figure out who they really are, as opposed to who they think they are, another aspect similar to Murray's own personality.

Lucas's T-shirt, shorts and jeans look (left); his sleeker, more form-fitting clothing (right).

Murray never played much basketball before the show, and was more into football while in high school. Because of this, a basketball coach was hired for Murray in order to improve his basketball skills. To go along with the character's personality, a "sedate" wardrobe was designed. Schwahn said of Lucas's wardrobe, "...He was a Levi's guy. He was, you know, he wore a lot of, like, plain T-shirts and things because we just wanted him to represent the everyman." Despite having the character start out this way, the series eventually let his wardrobe evolve. Starting from the fourth season on, he was given some "wilder stuff". Schwahn clarified, "You know, he can [now] rock something from Sean John, which normally would have been Nathan's department." He said the style of the characters really does evolve on the show, especially with the four-year timeline jump.

One Tree Hill's costume designer, Carol Cutshall, stated, "Diesel is so wonderful on [Murray]. Diesel jeans. It's an Italian company. A lot of times, Italian designers cut much more slimly...for a really lean physique." For the adult Lucas, she said that "they've had nice long sleeves and nice long shirts and really slim clothing and that looks best on [Murray]. He doesn't need to be swallowed up. He's got his own style as a person. It's not just up to me. I try to bring in what I think is going to fit him best." With the timeline jump, Lucas's main brands became Diesel, Guess menswear, and Juicy Couture.

Regarding the character's romantic life, Schwahn designed a love triangle between Lucas and the two female leads of the show, Peyton Sawyer, who turned out to be the one for him (although he had actually loved her since childhood), and Brooke Davis, creating an intense fan base rivalry. While describing Lucas and Peyton as soulmates and a "meant to be" pairing, he described Brooke and Lucas as "also genuine" and as having a great dynamic. He acknowledged that the fan bases are large and "very passionate" about their pairings. "There is a huge fanbase dedicated to Brooke and Lucas, and sometimes [those people] feel a bit betrayed, just as the fanbase dedicated to Peyton and Lucas felt betrayed [in Season 2, and parts of Season 3]," said Schwahn. "That tells me that we've done things correctly – that's the strength of a love triangle."

== Storylines ==
=== Overview ===
Lucas Scott is the son of Dan Scott and Karen Roe, and the nephew of Keith Scott; he has a younger half brother, Nathan Scott, on his father's side and a younger half-sister, Lily Roe Scott, on his mother's side (she is also his cousin through Keith). He was raised by his mother after his father abandoned them to marry Deb Lee, Nathan's mother. His uncle Keith, who always had feelings for Karen, took over the father figure role. Lucas grew up in Tree Hill, a small North Carolina town along with his best friend and later sister-in-law, Haley James Scott. He shares romantic bonds with Peyton Sawyer and Brooke Davis, is interested in basketball and literature, and suffers from the genetic heart disease hypertrophic cardiomyopathy.

=== Early seasons ===
At the beginning of the first season, 16-year-old Lucas Scott is recruited by coach Whitey Durham to play for the Ravens basketball team after most of the players are suspended for drunk-driving. He soon has troubles with his half-brother Nathan, who is also the Ravens captain, because Nathan wants to remain the star of the team and feels threatened by Lucas's arrival. Encouraged by Dan, who also wants Lucas off the team, Nathan and his teammates make life difficult for Lucas, on one occasion kidnapping him and throwing him into a ditch. Nevertheless, Lucas is determined to stay on the team (although he removes the name "Scott" from his jersey). He’s also had a big crush for Peyton (Nathan's girlfriend) for years, but he’s never had the courage to talk to her, until he goes help her with her broken down car and two finally speak for the first time, immediately developing a deep emotional connection. Disgusted by Nathan's behavior towards his brother, she eventually breaks up with him. Nathan retaliates by pursuing Lucas's best friend Haley, who agrees to tutor Nathan in return for him leaving Lucas alone. Lucas and Peyton’s bond keeps growing as they soon fall in love, but Peyton is initially scared of a romance with him (due to her fear of letting someone in because of the big losses she experienced) and rejects him. Lucas, devastated and heartbroken, starts dating Peyton's best friend, Brooke, as a rebound for her, but at the same time Peyton realizes she has made a mistake in turning Lucas away. He soon ends up cheating on Brooke with Peyton (though they don’t sleep together) because the two can’t deny how they feel towards each other anymore and he knows she is the one for him. On the night that Lucas and Peyton are about to tell Brooke they want to be together, he and Keith are involved in a car accident, and, for the first time in the series, Dan calls Lucas his son so that Lucas can get immediate treatment. Lucas wakes up from a short coma and breaks up with Brooke in order to be with Peyton, but she tearfully ends things with him too despite loving him out of guilt for betraying her best friend. Lucas's feelings towards Dan are challenged when he learns that Dan wanted joint custody of Lucas, but Karen refused. He also finds himself in Dan's position when Brooke claims to be pregnant, although this turns out to be false as Brooke was lying to seek her revenge on Lucas for breaking her heart. His friendship with Peyton is broken too once she learns he’s had a one-night stand with new resident Nicki not long after she broke up with him. However, his relationship with Nathan improves as Lucas realizes that he got a better deal than Nathan, who is damaged as a result of being raised by Dan. Wanting a fresh start, Lucas decides to leave town with Keith. Lucas and Nathan have a final conversation where Nathan calls Lucas his brother and Lucas says, "I'll miss you, little brother." Before leaving with Keith, he goes to say goodbye to Haley and discovers that she and Nathan have married.

In season 2, Lucas and Keith return to Tree Hill after Dan has a heart attack. Lucas tries to make up for his behavior with Peyton and Brooke and becomes friends with both of them. He also starts seeing a new girl named Anna Taggaro, but they break up amicably when Anna accepts that she's bisexual. Lucas discovers that he has inherited Dan's heart condition, but does not tell anyone except Dan. After discovering that Keith's new girlfriend Jules was actually hired by Dan to break Keith's heart, Lucas agrees to move in with Dan if he leaves Keith alone and pays for his heart medication. This sets Lucas at odds with his mother, as she cannot believe that Lucas would want to live with Dan rather than her. It also causes a new rift between Lucas and Nathan, as Nathan feels that Lucas is replacing him and is bitter about Haley's departure to go on tour singing. Lucas and Karen are reconciled when she learns half of the reason he is staying with Dan, which is to protect Keith. This plan to protect his uncle fails when Jules leaves Keith at the altar and Keith leaves town after discovering that Lucas and Karen knew that she was hired by Dan. Lucas discovers Deb's painkiller addiction and decides to avenge all of Dan's victims. He finds a stash of cash and an incriminating ledger in the attic at Dan's dealership and plans to expose Dan's illegal dealings, but ultimately fails as Dan has also incriminated Deb. Dan then reveals that the whole thing was a set-up to test Lucas's loyalty, which Lucas failed. As a result, he loses Dan's college fund for him (which Dan had been saving since Lucas was a baby) and even his heart medication. Nathan also ends his friendship with Lucas after discovering that Lucas had planned to bring Dan down and visited Haley behind his back in an attempt to patch up her and Nathan's marriage. Then, in the season finale, Lucas kisses Brooke and confesses that he wants to be with her because he's suddenly developed some true feelings for her. However, Brooke still leaves for California to spend the summer with her parents leaving him without an answer because she remembers how insecure and bad she felt when she was with him. Ultimately, it is just Lucas and a broken-hearted Peyton (because boyfriend Jake left her) for the summer and the last shot is of the two of them sharing a meaningful hug on the beach after they’ve finally made amends and reconciled.

In season 3, after having spent the whole summer together with Peyton, growing closer again and forming a great friendship by hanging out, sharing mutual secrets and intimate things, resulting in their bond becoming stronger than it has ever been, Lucas remains at odds with Dan, who accuses him of starting the fire at the dealership that nearly killed him. Dan tries to strangle Lucas on the basketball court, but Peyton, having learned the truth from Lucas, tells Dan that Lucas actually saved him from the fire. Lucas also protects the true arsonist: Deb. Lucas and Nathan continue to argue over Nathan's treatment of the returned Haley and have a public fight after Lucas accuses Nathan of being just like Dan. Lucas struggles to pay for his heart medication and steals money from his mother, which Haley sees, forcing him to tell her about his condition. He also become set on getting Brooke back and agrees to have a non-exclusive fling with her, who doesn't trust him because of their past, but a series of events leads Brooke to sleep with Chris Keller, tearing them apart. Even after that, Lucas and Brooke still don’t give up on the idea of being together: in fact, when she shows the 82 letters she’s written him during her vacation but did not send and tells him she wants to be with him, he decides to forgive her, then the two agree to start a real relationship. Meanwhile, he and Nathan gradually become friends again. Keith returns, and he and Karen finally get together and become engaged. Keith also plans to adopt Lucas. Tragedy strikes when Lucas's former friend Jimmy Edwards brings a gun to school and fires it, accidentally hitting Peyton and causing a lockdown ("With Tired Eyes, Tired Minds, Tired Souls, We Slept"). Lucas rushes into the school to save Peyton, who, during a weakness moment because she's lost a lot of blood and thinks she would die, tells him she loves him and the two share a brief but meaningful kiss. Lucas is then devastated by Jimmy and Keith's eventual deaths and, after seeing the effect of Keith's death on his mother, he decides to finally tell Whitey, Nathan, and Karen about his heart condition and quits basketball while growing apart from Brooke again due to them not being able to get each other and communicate, in particular during this tough moment. He goes on a college tour with his mother and realizes that he wants to become a writer. He is also Nathan's best man for his vow renewal to Haley, during which he and Brooke have a massive fight after he let it slip about the kiss with Peyton during the school shooting: this, in turn, causes Brooke to question her and Lucas' entire relationship, feeling that their relationship has never had emotional connection enough to be a real couple even regardless of Peyton. Their destiny is left uncertain, despite having certainly reached their worst moment.

At the beginning of season 4, Brooke breaks up with Lucas, feeling that they’ve grown too far apart. Lucas does a little try to get her back, but she acts immaturely towards him, so he quickly stops his pursuit of her, stating that he's not the guy for her. One day, he hurries to save Peyton from Internet stalker "Psycho Derek", meanwhile he becomes closer and closer to her, who has realized she is still in love with him. He also helps Karen, who is pregnant with Keith's baby, and plans on going to the University of North Carolina when he graduates so that he can be close to home in case she needs him. Dan also helps Karen with her pregnancy, wanting to make amends for Keith's death. After talking with Dan, Karen persuades Whitey to let Lucas play 15 minutes a game, so as not to let him miss out on something he loves. Brooke and Lucas try one last date, but both immediately realize it was a huge mistake as they've both understood they are not meant to be: when Lucas tells Peyton it’s over for good between him and Brooke, she finally declares her love to him, who is speechless because totally unprepared. Lucas then discovers that Nathan is planning to throw the State Championship game because of his debts. Lucas plans to prevent this and deliberately fails to take his heart medication in order to play better, but Nathan is inspired by learning that he is going to have a son and they win, with Lucas making the winning shot. During the celebration, after Brooke tells him she is fine with him getting together with Peyton as she’s understood herself they are meant to be, Lucas finally tells Peyton she is the one he wants next to him when all his dreams come true with his iconic "It's you" speech, then the two share a long-awaited kiss in the middle of the court. They officially become a couple at the after-party, but their happiness is short-lived when Haley gets hit by a car and Lucas tries to tell the paramedics what happened, only to suffer a heart attack. As he is in the hospital, Lucas dreams that he is visited by Keith, who shows Lucas what life would have been like if he had been a lesser person. In the end, Lucas realizes that he has to go back to his life because he never told Peyton that he loves her. Lucas wakes up and finally begins his relationship with Peyton, both of them happier than they've ever been. After the failed attempt of prom in Tree Hill High, the group go on a rescue mission to save Mouth who has become stranded in Honeygrove. They all then crash the local Prom, where he and Peyton finally make love for the first time. He also begins to investigate Keith's death, as the Keith in his dream suggested that Jimmy did not kill him, but he also starts getting closer to Dan, who tells Karen he wants a bigger part in Lucas's life. Lucas discovers the truth about Dan thanks to witness Abby Brown. He attacks Dan after walking in on him and Karen kissing and tells Karen that Dan killed Keith, but Dan convinces Karen that Lucas is delusional and needs help. Lucas then steals Deb's gun and confronts Dan in front of Karen, having set him up by sending him a message from "Abby". Karen collapses and Lucas fires a warning shot at Dan, telling him not to touch her. Karen is rushed to hospital with eclampsia and has an emergency c-section. Lucas is given a half-sister, who is named Lily Roe Scott when Karen regains consciousness. Later, Dan turns himself in for Keith's murder. Lucas graduates and gets, as a reward, his book (An Unkindness of Ravens) from his mother. That same day, he becomes an uncle with the birth of Nathan and Haley's son, James Lucas Scott, partly named after him. Lucas is named the godfather of James and announces that he will be assisting Whitey as Nathan's college basketball coach, but temporary separating from Peyton because she's going to study in LA and he doesn't want her to give up one her dreams to be with him: the two decide to go long distance, ending high school together and on a high note.

=== Missing years ===
One year from season 4, Lucas becomes the head coach of the Cobras, his college basketball team, and leads them to victory in the championships. Thinking about his future, he goes to see Peyton and asks her to marry him. She declines, feeling that it is too soon. As he is about to leave LA, his novel is picked up by a fresh new editor, Lindsey Strauss. It is a moment when his greatest dream came true. He is about to call Peyton, but decides against it, and instead calls Brooke. They spend a crazy evening together, and, in the end, he kisses her because he feels lonely and drunken. Although Brooke still has mild feelings for him at the time, she pushes him away, remembering Peyton and that he’s just drunk, heartbroken and still completely in love with her. One year later, he is scheduled to have a book signing in LA where Peyton is living and working. Having missed her and still loving her, he calls her and invites her to come to the signing. Peyton comes, but witnesses Lindsey giving Lucas a congratulatory kiss and, assuming they are in a relationship, leaves, thinking there is no hope for her and Lucas. Lucas thinks that Peyton did not bother to come and loses every hope of getting back together with her, and consequently, after some time, begins dating Lindsey.

=== Final seasons ===
In season 5, almost five years after high school graduation, Lucas, now 22, suffers from writer's block and is under pressure from his editor/girlfriend Lindsey. He also tries to help Haley with her son, James Lucas Scott. When Peyton comes back home, she reveals to him that she did come to the signing, and then inspires him by repeating his quote "Your art matters, that's what got me here", prompting him to begin writing again. When he tells Peyton that the bartender she is flirting with at the Clothes Over Bros store opening is not good enough for her, it becomes obvious that, despite his relationship with Lindsey, he still loves Peyton. After remembering the night he proposed, he goes straight to her house, though she is not there, but Brooke, who she is now living with Peyton and has finally completely moved on from him, understands what's happening and teases him about still being in love with her best friend. When Peyton begins to antagonize Lindsey, he goes to confront her, but things escalate into a verbal fight about their break up. A little bit later, after Peyton confesses she still loves him and kisses him, he kisses her back, passionately, but later proposes to Lindsey because of his fear of being rejected again by Peyton, leading her to tell him that she will bury her feelings so that he can be happy, which is the most important thing to her. He then wins his first game as the Ravens coach, although the female counterparts miss it because they were locked in the library. He soon has to go to Dan's parole and speak up in order to have him stay locked up. He decides to have Nathan as his best man and then fuses his bachelor party with Lindsey's. He also gives Haley his new book, and she tells him not to marry Lindsey after reading it because she realizes that it's about Peyton and his everlasting love for her. Lucas proceeds with the wedding anyway, but Lindsey stops it after realizing herself that his book is about Peyton. She leaves him at the altar and, when he chases after her, he sees her bags packed. After a confrontation, she leaves saying "People always leave, Luke. You know that." (A reference to one of Peyton's famous lines, also featured in his first book). Lucas then flees to stay with his mother and Andy after the failed wedding. Andy convinces Lucas to go after Lindsey, prompting him to go to her and tell her that one day she will come back to him. She comes back to Tree Hill for Jamie's 5th birthday, but tells Lucas that it is really over. He then helps Brooke cope with having baby Angie around. After Lindsey calls him to tell him she is seeing someone, he blows up after an opposing player gets away with attempting to injure Quentin Fields, drawing himself a 10-game suspension. He then ends up in a self-destructive spiral and one night, heavily drunk, tells Peyton he hates her when she comes to his aid. He later apologizes to her after being hardly confronted by Haley: he tells her that he obviously doesn't hate her, that it was hard letting her go, hard seeing her again and that it's still really hard for him, making once again apparent his everlasting love for her. Lindsey comes by to tell him his book is over and he can e-mail her the dedication. When he does, she reveals by phone that she still loves him. He then decides to go to Las Vegas and calls someone to get married. Brooke, Peyton, and Lindsey are all shown answering the phone, and the viewers are left hanging as to whom he proposed to.

In the first episode of the sixth season, the audience discovers that it was obviously Peyton on the receiving end of Lucas's phone call. He waits to see if she actually arrives, and moments later, he finds her through the crowd, making her way toward him with bags packed. They share passionate kisses, Peyton glowing with happiness, and then board the plane on their way to Las Vegas. When they get there, they spend the night in a kinky Vegas hotel room. The next day, they go to the wedding chapel, but the tackiness of the place convinces them that this was the wrong decision. Instead, Peyton takes Lucas to the hotel room where he first proposed to her and they do it all over again, but this time Peyton says "yes" before he has even asked the question, finally becoming engaged. On their way back to Tree Hill, he proposes to her to move in together in his house and she happily accepts. With the upcoming release of his new book, Lucas travels to New York to meet with Lindsey, and eventually tells her about his engagement to Peyton. He soon starts his book tour, but it fails fast and is canceled, so he returns home to Peyton. After the two resolve problems and fears of moving in together and their relationship continues to grow stronger, Lucas is offered a movie deal by Julian Baker. Julian asks Lucas questions about Peyton before she gets there, and after she runs into Julian near the bathroom, it is revealed that he is her ex-boyfriend. For three weeks, Peyton fails to tell Lucas about Julian, and Lucas is angry when he discovers their past on his own. Although he is initially angry, they patch things up, and Peyton convinces Lucas to continue taking a part in the making of the film, despite his reluctance to work with Julian. The film is to be shot in Tree Hill, North Carolina. He also learns Peyton is expecting their first child. Though they initially have problems with Peyton's pregnancy, the fact that she may die if the baby is born, the two are eventually married by the lake where they first met, and have their reception at Tric. They soon have a healthy daughter, Sawyer Brooke Scott, which Peyton names after her best friend Brooke (similar to the naming of James Lucas Scott), and the two ride off into the sunset, finally leaving happily ever after.

For Season 7, Mark Schwahn, the series' creator, said Lucas and Peyton are traveling the world; they are spending time with Karen and her husband Andy, and Lucas is writing a new book. In the season opener, Jamie celebrates his seventh birthday, his second without his uncle. Lucas sends Jamie the basketball which was given to him by Keith on Lucas's seventh birthday. In the card, Lucas says he and Peyton miss Jamie every day. In the later half of the season, Jamie asks Nathan about his relationship with Lucas. Nathan tells him that although they were not close when they were younger they became more like real brothers as they got older. He said, "Having a brother is a lot like having a best friend, he helped make me the man I am today."

On August 30, 2011, it was confirmed that Chad Michael Murray would be returning to the series' final season as Lucas. He returns to Tree Hill as Haley reaches out to him for help regarding Nathan's disappearance.

Lucas returned to Tree Hill during season nine, per the request of Haley. She asks him to take the kids out of town to live with him and Peyton until she can find Nathan and bring him home. However, he still holds resentment towards Dan and refuses to show up at the hospital after Dan is shot by one of Nathan's kidnappers during the rescue attempt.

== Reception ==
Lucas has been popular among teenagers and young adults, especially among female fans of the series, not only for his skill at basketball but for his romantic aspirations. His love life has been heavily debated among viewers. Don Williams of BuddyTV stated, "If you're a huge fan of One Tree Hill, chances are you've had a debate at some point about who Lucas Scott should ultimately settle down with". He added that the shipping fandom can be "an extremely rabid bunch" as lots of fans rooted for Lucas and Peyton from the beginning, while others hoped that he would end up with Brooke instead, but eventually Peyton turned out to be the one for him, as planned from the get-go: in fact, Mark Schwahn, the series' showrunner, confirmed that the two were always supposed to be the endgame couple, describing their love story as a soulmate/meant to be one. MTV defined Lucas and Peyton as the generation's Joey and Pacey, "the overly dramatic couple you could not help but root for", and the two emerged as one of the show's supercouples. Their departure received significant media attention and was even picked as one of the "12 most essential episodes of One Tree Hill" in 2009 by fans at starnewsonline.com.

Regarding Murray's portrayal, Paul Cooke of DVDActive.com said, "Murray does a fine job as a brooding Lucas." Kelsey Zukowsk of 2snaps.tv said, "Chad Michael Murray as Lucas plays one of the deeper roles... [He] does far better as Lucas, the one who seems to be motivated by truth and what is right, than any movie role I have seen him in." Television Without Pity, on the other hand, stated, "Chad Michael Murray is almost too pretty, looks good pouting on promo posters and modeling sponsored fashions, and can only muster one and a half emotions convincingly."

== See also ==
- List of fictional supercouples
- Quotes
