= Vaughn Wilson =

American actor (born 1976)

- Born: December 24, 1976 (age 48); Wilmington, North Carolina
- Occupation: Television actor

Vaughn L. Wilson (born December 24, 1976) is an American actor best known for playing the role of "Fergie Thompson" on the CW's hit show One Tree Hill. He was born and resides in Wilmington, North Carolina.

== Filmography ==
=== Film ===
Year	Title	Role	Notes
2003	Final Curtain	Leo Archer	
2005	The Last Confederate: The Story of Robert Adams	McCord slave	
2009	Mississippi Damned	Duckett	
2011	The Artifact	Eric	
2013	Don't Know Yet	Jubal	
2014	Jessabelle	Moses	
2015	Well Wishes	Lloyd	

=== Television ===
Year	Title	Role	Notes
2003–2009	One Tree Hill	Fergie Thompson	45 episodes
2005	Surface	Pizza Guy	Episode #1.7
2009	Eastbound & Down	Janitor #2	Episode: "Chapter 1"
2009	Port City P.D.	Willie T.	2 episodes
2017	Vaughan	Vaughan Hightower	6 episodes
