= Mark Schwahn =

American former film director (born 1966)

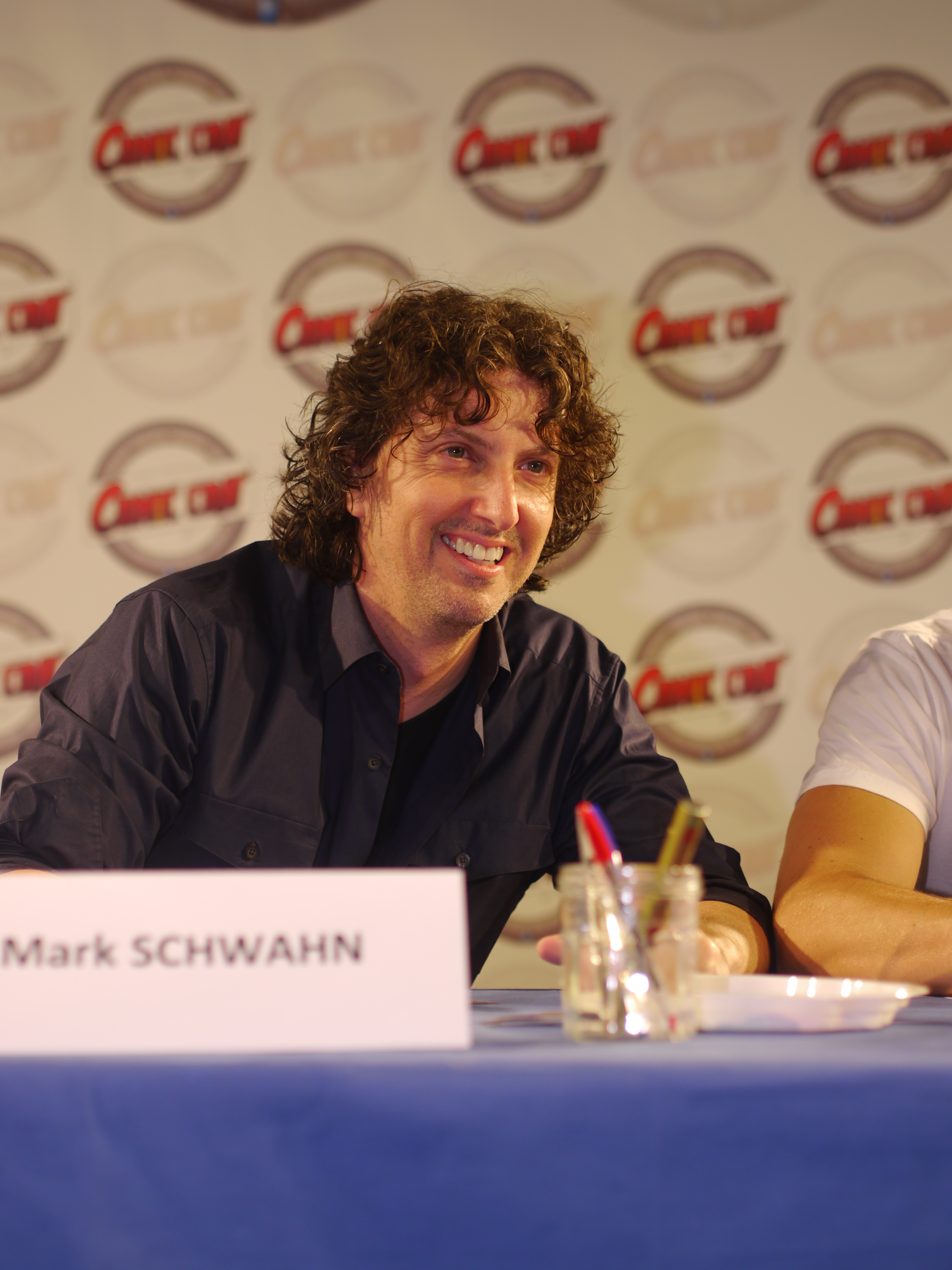
- Mark Schwahn in 2012
- Born: July 5, 1966 (age 60); Pontiac, Illinois, U.S.
- Education: University of Maryland
- Occupations: Director, producer, screenwriter
- Writing career
- Years active: 1996–2018
- Notable work: One Tree Hill

Mark Schwahn (born July 5, 1966) is an American former screenwriter, director, and producer. He is best known as the creator of the WB/CW teen drama series One Tree Hill.

== Early life ==
Mark Schwahn was born on July 5, 1966 in Pontiac, Illinois. He attended the University of Maryland where he earned a BA in radio, television, and film.

== Career ==
Schwahn has co-written Coach Carter (2005), The Perfect Score (2004), Whatever It Takes (2000) and 35 Miles from Normal (1997). In addition, he was creator of the TV series One Tree Hill, for which he also wrote and directed.

He served as producer for Whatever It Takes and One Tree Hill. He also directed 35 Miles from Normal, which he filmed in his hometown of Pontiac, Illinois.

His last major project was creating the E! scripted series The Royals.

=== Melrose Place spin-off ===
He emerged as a top candidate to write a planned spin-off of Melrose Place shortly after the network and CBS Paramount Television announced it in late October 2008. Schwahn signed a two-year deal with CPT in early October 2008, but it had not started until June 2009. Until then, he was under a pact with Warner Bros. Television, where he ran One Tree Hill. His agreement with Warner Bros. called for him to continue as executive producer and showrunner on One Tree Hill returning for the ninth and final season in January 2012. The move to tap Schwahn to conceive a contemporary version of Melrose Place resembles The CW and CPT's decision to have Veronica Mars creator Rob Thomas pen the original script for 90210. In early 2009, it was announced Schwahn would not be working on the project.

== Sexual harassment allegations ==
On November 12, 2017, TV writer Audrey Wauchope wrote on Twitter that she and her female writing partner were sexually harassed by Schwahn while working on One Tree Hill. Female cast members supported the allegations, and Hilarie Burton and Danneel Harris alleged that they had also been sexually harassed by Schwahn. The male stars of One Tree Hill released their own statements supporting their female co-stars and crew members. Schwahn was also accused by cast members of The Royals. Twenty-five female cast and crew members of the show released their own open letter stating that they, too, had been subjected to sexual harassment by Schwahn throughout the run of the show. In light of the allegations, Schwahn was suspended and ultimately fired from The Royals. Schwahn has no production credits since 2017 and has completely withdrawn from public life, making no statements in regards to his past actions and/or the end of his entertainment career.

== Filmography ==
=== Crew ===
Film
Year	Title	Credit	Notes
1997	35 Miles from Normal	Writer and director	Independent film
2000	Whatever It Takes	Writer and producer	
2004	The Perfect Score	Writer	
2005	Coach Carter	Writer	

Television
Year	Title	Credit	Notes
2003–2012	One Tree Hill	Series creator, writer, director, and executive producer	
2010	Spy School for Girls	Series co-creator; Writer and executive producer	Series production canceled
2010	Nashville	Co-writer and executive producer	Series production canceled; co-produced by Brad Paisley
2012	Shelter	Series creator, writer and executive producer	Pilot filmed
2015–2018	The Royals	Series creator; Writer, director, and executive producer	

=== Cast ===
Film and television
Year	Title	Role	Notes
1997	Colin Fitz Lives!	Venice Beach Fan	
2006–2008	One Tree Hill	Max	2 episodes
