= List of One Tree Hill episodes =

One Tree Hill is an American television series created by Mark Schwahn, who has also written over a third of the episodes, including each season's premiere and season finale. Schwahn shares executive producer duties with Joe Davola, Greg Prange, Mike Tollin, and Brian Robbins. It is produced by Tollin/Robbins Productions and Warner Bros. Television.

The series stars Chad Michael Murray and James Lafferty as half-brothers Lucas Scott and Nathan Scott, respectively, with Hilarie Burton, Bethany Joy Lenz, Sophia Bush, Lee Norris, and Antwon Tanner playing the parts of Peyton Sawyer, Haley James Scott, Brooke Davis, Marvin "Mouth" McFadden, and Antwon "Skills" Taylor.

From 2003 to 2006, the first three seasons of One Tree Hill originally aired on The WB before it merged with UPN to form The CW, which the show later aired until 2012. Eighty-eight episodes were produced during the first four seasons; due to the 2007–2008 Writers Guild of America strike, the fifth season consisted of only 18 episodes.

With the exception of the pilot, episode titles are named after the title of a song. Over the course of nine seasons, One Tree Hill aired a total of 187 episodes.

== Series overview ==
Season	Episodes	Originally released			Rank	Average viewership (in millions)
Season	Episodes	First released	Last released	Network	Rank	Average viewership (in millions)
1	22	September 23, 2003	May 11, 2004	The WB	136	3.84
2	23	September 21, 2004	May 24, 2005	The WB	129	4.34
3	22	October 5, 2005	May 3, 2006	The WB	137	3.06
4	21	September 27, 2006	June 13, 2007	The CW	133	2.94
5	18	January 8, 2008	May 19, 2008	The CW	122	2.92
6	24	September 1, 2008	May 18, 2009	The CW	110	2.84
7	22	September 14, 2009	May 17, 2010	The CW	115	2.28
8	22	September 14, 2010	May 17, 2011	The CW	129	1.78
9	13	January 11, 2012	April 4, 2012	The CW	159	1.48

== Episodes ==
=== Season 1 (2003–04) ===
No. overall	No. in season	Title	Directed by	Written by	Original release date	Prod. code	U.S. viewers (millions)
1	1	"Pilot"	Bryan Gordon	Mark Schwahn	September 23, 2003	177500	2.48
2	2	"The Places You Have Come to Fear the Most"	Bryan Gordon	Mark Schwahn	September 30, 2003	177501	3.30
3	3	"Are You True?"	Michael Grossman	Jennifer Cecil	October 7, 2003	177502	3.53
4	4	"Crash Into You"	David Carson	Mark B. Perry	October 14, 2003	177503	3.78
5	5	"All That You Can't Leave Behind"	Duane Clark	Story by : Jennifer Cecil & Ann Hamilton; Teleplay by : Jennifer Cecil & Mark Schwahn	October 21, 2003	177504	3.53
6	6	"Every Night Is Another Story"	Jason Moore	Mike Kelley	October 28, 2003	177505	3.40
7	7	"Life in a Glass House"	Robert Duncan McNeill	Mike Kelley	November 4, 2003	177506	3.62
8	8	"The Search for Something More"	John T. Kretchmer	Jennifer Cecil	November 11, 2003	177507	3.64
9	9	"With Arms Outstretched"	Greg Prange	Mark Schwahn	November 18, 2003	177508	3.75
10	10	"You Gotta Go There to Come Back"	Keith Samples	Mike Kelley	January 20, 2004	177509	4.35
11	11	"The Living Years"	Tom Wright	Mark B. Perry	January 27, 2004	177510	3.81
12	12	"Crash Course in Polite Conversations"	Sandy Smolan	Jessica Queller	February 3, 2004	177511	3.89
13	13	"Hanging by a Moment"	John Behring	Mark Schwahn	February 10, 2004	177512	4.00
14	14	"I Shall Believe"	Greg Prange	Jennifer Cecil	February 17, 2004	177513	4.39
15	15	"Suddenly Everything Has Changed"	David Carson	Mark B. Perry	February 24, 2004	177514	3.87
16	16	"The First Cut Is the Deepest"	Robert Duncan McNeill	Mike Kelley	March 2, 2004	177515	3.95
17	17	"Spirit in the Night"	Duane Clark	Terrence Coli	April 6, 2004	177516	3.24
18	18	"To Wish Impossible Things"	Billy Dickson	Mark Schwahn	April 13, 2004	177517	4.81
19	19	"How Can You Be Sure?"	Thomas J. Wright	Karyn Usher	April 20, 2004	177518	4.40
20	20	"What Is and What Should Never Be"	Perry Lang	Edward Kitsis & Adam Horowitz	April 27, 2004	177519	4.23
21	21	"The Leaving Song"	Davis Carson	Jennifer Cecil & Mark B. Perry	May 4, 2004	177520	4.09
22	22	"The Games That Play Us"	Greg Prange	Mark Schwahn	May 11, 2004	177521	4.49

=== Season 2 (2004–05) ===
No. overall	No. in season	Title	Directed by	Written by	Original release date	Prod. code	U.S. viewers (millions)
23	1	"The Desperate Kingdom of Love"	Greg Prange	Mark Schwahn	September 21, 2004	2T5251	4.93
24	2	"Truth Doesn't Make a Noise"	Billy Dickson	Mark B. Perry	September 28, 2004	2T5252	4.93
25	3	"Near Wild Heaven"	Greg Prange	James Stoteraux & Chad Fiveash	October 5, 2004	2T5253	5.43
26	4	"You Can't Always Get What You Want"	Joanna Kerns	Jennifer Cecil	October 12, 2004	2T5254	4.83
27	5	"I Will Dare"	Thomas J. Wright	Mark Schwahn	October 19, 2004	2T5255	4.50
28	6	"We Might as Well Be Strangers"	Sandy Bookstaver	Terrence Coli	October 26, 2004	2T5256	4.57
29	7	"Let the Reigns Go Loose"	David Paymer	R. Lee Fleming, Jr.	November 2, 2004	2T5257	4.62
30	8	"Truth, Bitter Truth"	Billy Dickson	Stacy Rukeyser	November 9, 2004	2T5258	4.54
31	9	"The Trick Is to Keep Breathing"	John Asher	James Stoteraux & Chad Fiveash	November 16, 2004	2T5259	4.18
32	10	"Don't Take Me for Granted"	Lev L. Spiro	Mark Schwahn	November 30, 2004	2T5260	4.36
33	11	"The Heart Brings You Back"	Matt Shakman	Mark B. Perry	January 25, 2005	2T5261	4.07
34	12	"Between Order and Randomness"	Bethany Rooney	Terrence Coli	February 1, 2005	2T5262	4.13
35	13	"The Hero Dies in This One"	Kevin Dowling	Jennifer Cecil	February 8, 2005	2T5263	4.47
36	14	"The Quiet Things That No One Ever Knows"	Babu Subramaniam	R. Lee Fleming, Jr.	February 15, 2005	2T5264	4.28
37	15	"Unopened Letter to the World"	Greg Prange	Mark Schwahn	February 22, 2005	2T5265	4.25
38	16	"Somewhere a Clock Is Ticking"	Billy Dickson	Stacy Rukeyser	March 1, 2005	2T5266	3.95
39	17	"Something I Can Never Have"	Paul Johansson	Mike Herro & David Strauss	April 19, 2005	2T5267	4.08
40	18	"The Lonesome Road"	Michael Lange	John A. Norris	April 26, 2005	2T5268	4.42
41	19	"I'm Wide Awake, It's Morning"	Thomas J. Wright	Mark Schwahn	May 3, 2005	2T5269	4.05
42	20	"Lifetime Piling Up"	Les Butler	Mark B. Perry	May 10, 2005	2T5270	3.78
43	21	"What Could Have Been"	Bethany Rooney	Jennifer Cecil	May 17, 2005	2T5271	4.20
44	22	"The Tide That Left and Never Came Back"	Thomas J. Wright	Mark Schwahn	May 24, 2005	2T5272	3.61
45	23	"The Leavers Dance"	Greg Prange	Mark Schwahn	May 24, 2005	2T5273	3.61

=== Season 3 (2005–06) ===
No. overall	No. in season	Title	Directed by	Written by	Original release date	Prod. code	U.S. viewers (millions)
46	1	"Like You Like an Arsonist"	Greg Prange	Mark Schwahn	October 5, 2005	2T6151	3.46
47	2	"From the Edge of the Deep Green Sea"	Kevin Dowling	Mark Schwahn	October 12, 2005	2T6152	3.12
48	3	"First Day on a Brand New Planet"	Billy Dickson	Terrence Coli	October 19, 2005	2T6153	3.12
49	4	"An Attempt to Tip the Scales"	Janice Cooke	Stacy Rukeyser	October 26, 2005	2T6154	3.36
50	5	"A Multitude of Casualties"	Thomas J. Wright	R. Lee Fleming, Jr	November 2, 2005	2T6155	3.03
51	6	"Locked Hearts & Hand Grenades"	Marita Grabiak	James Stoteraux & Chad Fiveash	November 9, 2005	2T6156	3.42
52	7	"Champagne for My Real Friends, Real Pain for My Sham Friends"	Paul Johansson	Mark Schwahn	November 16, 2005	2T6157	3.52
53	8	"The Worst Day Since Yesterday"	John Asher	Mike Herro & David Strauss	November 30, 2005	2T6158	3.16
54	9	"How a Resurrection Really Feels"	Greg Prange	Mark Schwahn	December 7, 2005	2T6159	3.33
55	10	"Brave New World"	John Asher	John A. Norris	January 11, 2006	2T6160	3.23
56	11	"Return of the Future"	Bethany Rooney	Terrence Coli	January 18, 2006	2T6161	2.67
57	12	"I've Got Dreams to Remember"	Stuart Gillard	Mike Herro & David Strauss	January 25, 2006	2T6162	2.70
58	13	"The Wind That Blew My Heart Away"	David Jackson	Stacy Rukeyser	February 1, 2006	2T6163	3.01
59	14	"All Tomorrow's Parties"	David Paymer	Anna Lotto	February 8, 2006	2T6164	2.89
60	15	"Just Watch the Fireworks"	Billy Dickson	James Stoteraux & Chad Fiveash	February 15, 2006	2T6165	2.85
61	16	"With Tired Eyes, Tired Minds, Tired Souls, We Slept"	Greg Prange	Mark Schwahn	March 1, 2006	2T6166	3.36
62	17	"Who Will Survive, and What Will Be Left of Them"	John Asher	Mark Schwahn	March 29, 2006	2T6167	2.83
63	18	"When It Isn't Like It Should Be"	Paul Johansson	R. Lee Fleming, Jr.	April 5, 2006	2T6168	2.93
64	19	"I Slept with Someone in Fall Out Boy and All I Got Was This Stupid Song Written About Me"	Moira Kelly	William H. Brown	April 12, 2006	2T6169	2.76
65	20	"Everyday Is a Sunday Evening"	Billy Dickson	Mark Schwahn	April 19, 2006	2T6170	2.67
66	21	"Over the Hills and Far Away"	Thomas J. Wright	Mark Schwahn	April 26, 2006	2T6171	2.87
67	22	"The Show Must Go On"	Mark Schwahn	Mark Schwahn	May 3, 2006	2T6172	3.06

=== Season 4 (2006–07) ===
No. overall	No. in season	Title	Directed by	Written by	Original release date	Prod. code	U.S. viewers (millions)
68	1	"The Same Deep Water as You"	Greg Prange	Mark Schwahn	September 27, 2006	3T5751	3.44
69	2	"Things I Forgot at Birth"	Greg Prange	Mark Schwahn	October 4, 2006	3T5752	3.09
70	3	"Good News for People Who Love Bad News"	John Asher	Mike Herro & David Strauss	October 11, 2006	3T5753	3.25
71	4	"Can't Stop This Thing We've Started"	Bethany Rooney	Terrence Coli	October 18, 2006	3T5754	2.97
72	5	"I Love You But I've Chosen Darkness"	Stuart Gillard	Mark Schwahn	October 25, 2006	3T5755	3.67
73	6	"Where Did You Sleep Last Night?"	Paul Johansson	William H. Brown	November 8, 2006	3T5756	3.56
74	7	"All These Things That I've Done"	David Jackson	Adele Lim	November 15, 2006	3T5757	3.15
75	8	"Nothing Left to Say But Goodbye"	Janice Cooke	John A. Norris	November 22, 2006	3T5758	2.53
76	9	"Some You Give Away"	Greg Prange	Mark Schwahn	November 29, 2006	3T5759	4.15
77	10	"Songs to Love and Die By"	John Asher	Mark Schwahn	December 6, 2006	3T5760	4.24
78	11	"Everything in Its Right Place"	Michael Lange	Dawn Urbont	January 17, 2007	3T5761	2.20
79	12	"Resolve"	Moira Kelly	Michelle Furtney-Goodman	January 24, 2007	3T5762	2.23
80	13	"Pictures of You"	Les Butler	Mark Schwahn	February 7, 2007	3T5763	2.73
81	14	"Sad Songs for Dirty Lovers"	Janice Cooke	William H. Brown	February 14, 2007	3T5764	2.25
82	15	"Prom Night at Hater High"	Paul Johansson	Mike Herro & David Strauss	February 21, 2007	3T5765	2.89
83	16	"You Call It Madness, But I Call It Love"	Thomas J. Wright	Terrence Coli	May 2, 2007	3T5766	3.25
84	17	"It Gets the Worst at Night"	Greg Prange	Mark Schwahn & Jim Lee	May 9, 2007	3T5767	2.95
85	18	"The Runaway Found"	David Jackson	Mark Schwahn	May 16, 2007	3T5768	2.68
86	19	"Ashes of Dreams You Let Die"	Michael Lange	John A. Norris	May 30, 2007	3T5769	2.06
87	20	"The Birth and Death of the Day"	Greg Prange	Mark Schwahn	June 6, 2007	3T5770	2.21
88	21	"All of a Sudden I Miss Everyone"	Mark Schwahn	Mark Schwahn	June 13, 2007	3T5771	2.33

=== Season 5 (2008) ===
No. overall	No. in season	Title	Directed by	Written by	Original release date	Prod. code	U.S. viewers (millions)
89	1	"4 Years, 6 Months, 2 Days"	Greg Prange	Mark Schwahn	January 8, 2008	3T6801	3.36
90	2	"Racing Like a Pro"	Paul Johansson	Mark Schwahn	January 8, 2008	3T6802	3.57
91	3	"My Way Home Is Through You"	David Jackson	John A. Norris	January 15, 2008	3T6803	2.72
92	4	"It's Alright, Ma (I'm Only Bleeding)"	Janice Cooke	Adele Lim	January 22, 2008	3T6804	3.04
93	5	"I Forgot to Remember to Forget"	Liz Friedlander	Terrence Coli	January 29, 2008	3T6805	2.79
94	6	"Don't Dream It's Over"	Thomas J. Wright	Mark Schwahn	February 5, 2008	3T6806	2.86
95	7	"In Da Club"	Greg Prange	Mike Herro & David Strauss	February 12, 2008	3T6807	3.16
96	8	"Please, Please, Please Let Me Get What I Want"	Paul Johansson	Mike Daniels	February 19, 2008	3T6808	2.85
97	9	"For Tonight You're Only Here to Know"	Joe Davola	Mark Schwahn	February 26, 2008	3T6809	3.18
98	10	"Running to Stand Still"	Clark Mathis	William H. Brown	March 4, 2008	3T6810	2.93
99	11	"You're Gonna Need Someone on Your Side"	Michael J. Leone	Zachary Haynes	March 11, 2008	3T6811	2.50
100	12	"Hundred"	Les Butler	Mark Schwahn	March 18, 2008	3T6812	3.00
101	13	"Echoes, Silence, Patience, and Grace"	Greg Prange	Mark Schwahn	April 14, 2008	3T6813	2.80
102	14	"What Do You Go Home To?"	Liz Friedlander	Mark Schwahn	April 21, 2008	3T6814	2.93
103	15	"Life Is Short"	Paul Johansson	Eliza Delson	April 28, 2008	3T6815	2.57
104	16	"Cryin' Won't Help You Now"	Greg Prange	William H. Brown	May 5, 2008	3T6816	2.29
105	17	"Hate Is Safer Than Love"	Stuart Gillard	Mark Schwahn	May 12, 2008	3T6817	2.72
106	18	"What Comes After the Blues?"	Mark Schwahn	Mark Schwahn	May 19, 2008	3T6818	3.23

=== Season 6 (2008–09) ===
No. overall	No. in season	Title	Directed by	Written by	Original release date	Prod. code	U.S. viewers (millions)
107	1	"Touch Me I'm Going to Scream, Part 1"	Stuart Gillard	Mark Schwahn	September 1, 2008	3T7551	3.24
108	2	"One Million Billionth of a Millisecond on a Sunday Morning"	Greg Prange	Mark Schwahn	September 8, 2008	3T7552	3.28
109	3	"Get Cape. Wear Cape. Fly."	Liz Friedlander	Mark Schwahn	September 15, 2008	3T7553	3.37
110	4	"Bridge Over Troubled Water"	Paul Johansson	Terrence Coli	September 22, 2008	3T7554	3.14
111	5	"You've Dug Your Own Grave, Now Lie in It"	John Asher	William H. Brown	September 29, 2008	3T7555	3.42
112	6	"Choosing My Own Way of Life"	Clark Mathis	John A. Norris	October 13, 2008	3T7556	3.48
113	7	"Messin' with the Kid"	Greg Prange	Mike Herro & David Strauss	October 20, 2008	3T7557	3.69
114	8	"Our Life Is Not a Movie or Maybe"	Peter B. Kowalski	Mark Schwahn	October 27, 2008	3T7558	3.21
115	9	"Sympathy for the Devil"	Bradley Walsh	Michael Daniels	November 3, 2008	3T7559	3.02
116	10	"Even Fairy Tale Characters Would Be Jealous"	Janice Cooke	Nikki Schiefelbein	November 10, 2008	3T7560	2.99
117	11	"We Three (My Echo, My Shadow and Me)"	Joe Davola	Chad Michael Murray	November 17, 2008	3T7561	2.72
118	12	"You Have to Be Joking (Autopsy of the Devil's Brain)"	Mark Schwahn	Mark Schwahn	November 24, 2008	3T7562	2.65
119	13	"Things a Mama Don't Know"	Michael J. Leone	Karin Gist	January 5, 2009	3T7563	2.66
120	14	"A Hand to Take Hold of the Scene"	Chad Michael Murray	Mike Daniels	January 12, 2009	3T7564	3.06
121	15	"We Change, We Wait"	Les Butler	John Norris	January 19, 2009	3T7565	2.60
122	16	"Screenwriter's Blues"	Bethany Joy Lenz	Mike Herro & David Strauss	February 2, 2009	3T7566	2.65
123	17	"You and Me and the Bottle Makes Three Tonight"	Greg Prange	Terrence Coli	March 16, 2009	3T7567	2.41
124	18	"Searching for a Former Clarity"	Joe Davola	Mark Schwahn	March 23, 2009	3T7568	2.40
125	19	"Letting Go"	Paul Johansson	David Handelman	March 30, 2009	3T7569	2.36
126	20	"I Would for You"	Peter B. Kowalski	Chris "CARM" Armstrong & Bryan Gracia	April 20, 2009	3T7570	2.45
127	21	"A Kiss to Build a Dream On"	Erica Dunton	Karin Gist	April 27, 2009	3T7571	2.28
128	22	"Show Me How to Live"	James Lafferty	William H. Brown	May 4, 2009	3T7572	2.23
129	23	"Forever and Almost Always"	Greg Prange	Mark Schwahn	May 11, 2009	3T7573	2.30
130	24	"Remember Me as a Time of Day"	Mark Schwahn	Mark Schwahn	May 18, 2009	3T7574	2.68

=== Season 7 (2009–10) ===
No. overall	No. in season	Title	Directed by	Written by	Original release date	Prod. code	U.S. viewers (millions)
131	1	"4:30 AM (Apparently They Were Traveling Abroad)"	Clark Mathis	Mark Schwahn	September 14, 2009	3X5301	2.45
132	2	"What Are You Willing to Lose?"	Les Butler	Mark Schwahn	September 21, 2009	3X5302	2.29
133	3	"Hold My Hand as I'm Lowered"	Liz Friedlander	Mark Schwahn	September 28, 2009	3X5303	2.51
134	4	"Believe Me, I'm Lying"	Greg Prange	John A. Norris	October 5, 2009	3X5304	2.13
135	5	"Your Cheatin' Heart"	Peter B. Kowalski	Mike Herro & David Strauss	October 12, 2009	3X5305	2.55
136	6	"Deep Ocean Vast Sea"	Janice Cooke	Mike Daniels	October 19, 2009	3X5306	2.21
137	7	"I and Love and You"	James Lafferty	Mark Schwahn	October 26, 2009	3X5307	2.67
138	8	"(I Just) Died in Your Arms Tonight"	Michael J. Leone	Terrence Coli	November 2, 2009	3X5308	2.32
139	9	"Now You Lift Your Eyes to the Sun"	Sophia Bush	Karen Gist	November 9, 2009	3X5309	2.67
140	10	"You Are a Runner and I Am My Father's Son"	Paul Johansson	Mark Schwahn	November 16, 2009	3X5310	2.63
141	11	"You Know I Love You, Don't You?"	Greg Prange	William H. Brown	November 30, 2009	3X5311	2.40
142	12	"Some Roads Lead Nowhere"	Mark Schwahn	Mark Schwahn	December 7, 2009	3X5312	2.57
143	13	"Weeks Go by Like Days"	Joe Davola	Karin Gist	January 18, 2010	3X5313	2.18
144	14	"Family Affair"	Paul Johansson	Mike Herro & David Strauss	January 25, 2010	3X5314	2.20
145	15	"Don't You Forget About Me"	Les Butler	Terrence Coli	February 1, 2010	3X5315	2.14
146	16	"My Attendance Is Bad But My Intentions Are Good"	Jessica Landaw	Nikki Schiefelbein	February 8, 2010	3X5316	2.17
147	17	"At the Bottom of Everything"	Bethany Joy Lenz	John A. Norris	February 15, 2010	3X5317	1.86
148	18	"The Last Day of Our Acquaintance"	Joe Davola	Mike Daniels	February 22, 2010	3X5318	2.23
149	19	"Every Picture Tells a Story"	Chad Graves	William H. Brown	April 26, 2010	3X5319	2.01
150	20	"Learning to Fall"	Greg Prange	Shaina Fewell & Renee Intlekofer	May 3, 2010	3X5320	1.94
151	21	"What's in the Ground Belongs to You"	Peter B. Kowalski	Mark Schwahn	May 10, 2010	3X5321	2.09
152	22	"Almost Everything I Wish I'd Said the Last Time I Saw You"	Mark Schwahn	Mark Schwahn	May 17, 2010	3X5322	2.02

=== Season 8 (2010–11) ===
No. overall	No. in season	Title	Directed by	Written by	Original release date	Prod. code	U.S. viewers (millions)
153	1	"Asleep at Heaven's Gate"	Mark Schwahn	Mark Schwahn	September 14, 2010	3X6351	2.14
154	2	"I Can't See You, But I Know You're There"	Joe Davola	Mark Schwahn	September 21, 2010	3X6352	1.86
155	3	"The Space in Between"	Greg Prange	Mark Schwahn	September 28, 2010	3X6353	1.83
156	4	"We All Fall Down"	Peter B. Kowalski	William H. Brown	October 5, 2010	3X6354	1.97
157	5	"Nobody Taught Us to Quit"	James Lafferty	Mark Schwahn	October 12, 2010	3X6355	1.91
158	6	"Not Afraid"	Sophia Bush	John A. Norris	October 19, 2010	3X6356	1.90
159	7	"Luck Be a Lady"	Les Butler	Mike Herro & David Strauss	November 2, 2010	3X6357	1.82
160	8	"Mouthful of Diamonds"	Michael J. Leone	Mark Schwahn	November 9, 2010	3X6358	1.70
161	9	"Between Raising Hell and Amazing Grace"	Bethany Joy Lenz	Nikki Schiefelbein	November 16, 2010	3X6359	1.90
162	10	"Lists, Plans"	Joe Davola	Johnny Richardson	November 30, 2010	3X6360	1.81
163	11	"Darkness on the Edge of Town"	Mark Schwahn	Mark Schwahn	December 7, 2010	3X6361	2.20
164	12	"The Drinks We Drank Last Night"	Chad Graves	Shaina Fewell	January 25, 2011	3X6362	1.90
165	13	"The Other Half of Me"	Greg Prange	John A. Norris	February 1, 2011	3X6363	2.42
166	14	"Holding Out for a Hero"	Peter B. Kowalski	Mike Herro & David Strauss	February 8, 2011	3X6364	1.60
167	15	"Valentine's Day Is Over"	Paul Johansson	Mark Schwahn	February 15, 2011	3X6365	1.65
168	16	"I Think I'm Gonna Like It Here"	Steven Goldfried	Rachel Specter & Audrey Wauchope	February 22, 2011	3X6366	2.01
169	17	"The Smoker You Drink, the Player You Get"	Les Butler	Mark Schwahn	March 1, 2011	3X6367	1.60
170	18	"Quiet Little Voices"	Austin Nichols	Mark Schwahn	April 19, 2011	3X6368	1.41
171	19	"Where Not to Look for Freedom"	Joe Davola	Mark Schwahn	April 26, 2011	3X6369	1.45
172	20	"The Man Who Sailed Around His Soul"	Mark Schwahn	Mark Schwahn	May 3, 2011	3X6370	1.25
173	21	"Flightless Bird, American Mouth"	Greg Prange	Mark Schwahn	May 10, 2011	3X6371	1.30
174	22	"This Is My House, This Is My Home"	Mark Schwahn	Mark Schwahn	May 17, 2011	3X6372	1.48

=== Season 9 (2012) ===
No. overall	No. in season	Title	Directed by	Written by	Original release date	Prod. code	U.S. viewers (millions)
175	1	"Know This, We've Noticed"	Mark Schwahn	Mark Schwahn	January 11, 2012	3X7201	1.72
176	2	"In the Room Where You Sleep"	Joe Davola	Mark Schwahn	January 18, 2012	3X7202	1.53
177	3	"Love the Way You Lie"	Paul Johansson	Lenn K. Rosenfeld	January 25, 2012	3X7203	1.46
178	4	"Don't You Want to Share the Guilt?"	Les Butler	Nikki Schiefelbein	February 1, 2012	3X7204	1.52
179	5	"The Killing Moon"	Greg Prange	Shaina Fewell	February 8, 2012	3X7205	1.35
180	6	"Catastrophe and the Cure"	James Lafferty	Roger Grant	February 15, 2012	3X7206	1.40
181	7	"Last Known Surroundings"	Austin Nichols	Mark Schwahn	February 22, 2012	3X7207	1.43
182	8	"A Rush of Blood to the Head"	Greg Prange	Johnny Richardson	February 29, 2012	3X7208	1.57
183	9	"Every Breath Is a Bomb"	Peter B. Kowalski	Ian Biggins	March 7, 2012	3X7209	1.47
184	10	"Hardcore Will Never Die, But You Will"	Mark Schwahn	Mark Schwahn	March 14, 2012	3X7210	1.52
185	11	"Danny Boy"	Joe Davola	Mike Herro & David Strauss	March 21, 2012	3X7211	1.50
186	12	"Anyone Who Had a Heart"	Sophia Bush	Brian L. Ridings	March 28, 2012	3X7212	1.34
187	13	"One Tree Hill"	Mark Schwahn	Mark Schwahn	April 4, 2012	3X7213	1.43

== Ratings ==
=== Seasons 1–3 ===
One Tree Hill : U.S. viewers per episode (millions)

Season	Episode number																						
Season	1	2	3	4	5	6	7	8	9	10	11	12	13	14	15	16	17	18	19	20	21	22	23
1	2.48	3.31	3.53	3.78	3.53	3.40	3.62	3.64	3.75	4.35	3.81	3.89	4.00	4.39	3.87	3.95	3.24	4.81	4.40	4.23	4.09	4.49	–
2	4.93	4.93	5.43	4.83	4.50	4.57	4.62	4.54	4.18	4.36	4.07	4.13	4.47	4.28	4.25	3.95	4.08	4.42	4.05	3.78	4.20	3.61	3.61
3	3.46	3.12	3.12	3.36	3.03	3.42	3.52	3.16	3.33	3.23	2.67	2.70	3.01	2.89	2.85	3.36	2.83	2.93	2.76	2.67	2.87	3.06	–

Audience measurement performed by Nielsen Media Research

=== Seasons 4–6 ===
One Tree Hill : U.S. viewers per episode (millions)

Season	Episode number																							
Season	1	2	3	4	5	6	7	8	9	10	11	12	13	14	15	16	17	18	19	20	21	22	23	24
4	3.44	3.09	3.25	2.97	3.67	3.56	3.15	2.53	4.15	4.24	2.20	2.23	2.73	2.25	2.89	3.25	2.95	2.68	2.06	2.21	2.33	–		
5	3.36	3.57	2.72	3.04	2.79	2.86	3.16	2.85	3.18	2.93	2.50	3.00	2.80	2.93	2.57	2.29	2.72	3.23	–					
6	3.24	3.28	3.37	3.14	3.42	3.48	3.69	3.21	3.02	2.99	2.72	2.65	2.66	3.06	2.60	2.65	2.41	2.40	2.36	2.45	2.28	2.23	2.30	2.68

Audience measurement performed by Nielsen Media Research

=== Seasons 7–9 ===
One Tree Hill : U.S. viewers per episode (millions)

Season	Episode number																					
Season	1	2	3	4	5	6	7	8	9	10	11	12	13	14	15	16	17	18	19	20	21	22
7	2.45	2.29	2.51	2.13	2.55	2.21	2.67	2.32	2.67	2.63	2.40	2.57	2.18	2.20	2.14	2.17	1.86	2.23	2.01	1.94	2.09	2.02
8	2.14	1.86	1.83	1.97	1.91	1.90	1.82	1.70	1.90	1.81	2.20	1.90	2.42	1.60	1.65	2.01	1.60	1.41	1.45	1.25	1.30	1.48
9	1.72	1.53	1.46	1.52	1.35	1.40	1.43	1.57	1.47	1.52	1.50	1.34	1.43	–								

Audience measurement performed by Nielsen Media Research
