= One Tree Hill season 3 =

One Tree Hill
- Season 3
- One Tree Hill Season 3 DVD cover
- No. of episodes: 22

Release
- Original network: The WB
- Original release: October 5, 2005 – May 3, 2006

Season chronology
- ← Previous; Season 2 Next → Season 4

The third season of One Tree Hill, an American teen drama television series, began airing on October 5, 2005. The season concluded on May 3, 2006, after 22 episodes. It is the final season which aired on The WB television network as the network merged with UPN to form The CW. It is also the final season with Craig Sheffer as Keith Scott.

Season three dipped in ratings, averaging 3.07 million viewers and ranking #137 with 1.2 rating.

== Cast and characters ==
=== Main ===
- Chad Michael Murray as Lucas Scott
- James Lafferty as Nathan Scott
- Hilarie Burton as Peyton Sawyer
- Bethany Joy Galeotti as Haley James Scott
- Paul Johansson as Dan Scott
- Sophia Bush as Brooke Davis
- Barbara Alyn Woods as Deb Scott
- Lee Norris as Mouth McFadden
- Barry Corbin as Whitey Durham
- Craig Sheffer as Keith Scott
- Moira Kelly as Karen Roe

=== Recurring ===
- Danneel Harris as Rachel Gatina
- Bevin Prince as Bevin Mirskey
- Sheryl Lee as Ellie Harp
- Antwon Tanner as Antwon "Skills" Taylor
- Vaughn Wilson as Fergie Thompson
- Tyler Hilton as Chris Keller
- Cullen Moss as Junk Moretti
- Kevin Kilner as Larry Sawyer
- Brett Claywell as Tim Smith
- Kelsey Chow as Gigi Silveri
- Michael Trucco as Cooper Lee
- Bryan Greenberg as Jake Jagielski
- Pete Wentz as Pete Wentz
- Colin Fickes as Jimmy Edwards
- Allison Scagliotti as Abby Brown
- Amber Wallace as Glenda Farrell
- Shawn Shepard as Principal Turner

=== Special guest star ===
- Fall Out Boy as themselves
- Nada Surf as themselves
- Jack's Mannequin as themselves
- Michelle Featherstone as herself

== Episodes ==
No. overall	No. in season	Title	Directed by	Written by	Original release date	Prod. code	U.S. viewers (millions)
46	1	"Like You Like an Arsonist"	Greg Prange	Mark Schwahn	October 5, 2005	2T6151	3.46
Dan is found alive outside the dealership. Nathan, mad at Haley, tells her he's leaving for basketball camp. Lucas and Peyton, alone for the summer, tell each other it's always gonna be them, no matter what. Three months later, Karen and Brooke come back to town and Dan has recovered. Peyton feels her mother lied to her by not telling her she was adopted: Larry reassures her they planned to, but couldn't because Mom died, then he was scared to upset her. Brooke tells Lucas she wants to be non-exclusive and see other people: he hesitantly agrees though doesn't want to see anyone else. Deb tells Dan she wants a divorce. Brooke moves into Nathan's old apartment with Haley. Dan remembers seeing someone the night of the fire. Lucas tells Peyton that Ellie is back in town. At camp, Nathan is wearing his wedding ring as a necklace. This episode is named after a song by Paris, Texas.
47	2	"From the Edge of the Deep Green Sea"	Kevin Dowling	Mark Schwahn	October 12, 2005	2T6152	3.12
Brooke throws a beach party to celebrate the end of summer. Nathan returns to town and wants nothing to do with Lucas or to talk to Haley. Peyton learns from Ellie she tried to visit her when she was ten and Larry hid it from her. Dan has been having flashbacks from the night of the fire and confronts Karen. Lucas tells Peyton he saw Ellie seemingly making a drug deal. Lucas tells Nathan he can hate him, but if he hurts Haley he will hurt Nathan. Nathan tells Haley he doesn't want to hurt her, but he doesn't know what they are to each other yet. Lucas tells Brooke, who is messing around, he's the guy for her. Peyton confronts Ellie about the drugs. Dan comes to the beach, and seeing Lucas by the bonfire thinks he remembers Lucas in the dealership during the fire. This episode is named after a song by The Cure.
48	3	"First Day on a Brand New Planet"	Billy Dickson	Terrence Coli	October 19, 2005	2T6153	3.12
Lucas and Haley meet on the roof of the cafe. They read their old New Year predictions, and write new predictions. As senior year begins, Haley and Nathan avoid each other. Ellie tells Lucas she was buying marijuana because she has cancer and it helps nausea; she didn't tell Peyton because she wanted to know her on her own terms. Dan confronts Lucas about being in the dealership, but he denies it. Larry lets Ellie visit Peyton's bedroom which upsets her. Brooke gets a job at a clothing store to pay rent. Lucas tells Peyton about Ellie's diagnosis. Dan arrives and strangles Lucas thinking it was him who tried to kill him; Peyton reveals Lucas is the one who saved his life and Dan stops. Nathan tells Haley he wants a divorce not an annulment - as that would deny they were ever married. They need be apart for a year for a divorce: Haley tells him she knows they will be together. This episode is named after a song by the band Jesse James.
49	4	"An Attempt to Tip the Scales"	Janice Cooke	Stacy Rukeyser	October 26, 2005	2T6154	3.36
Peyton and Brooke throw a costume party at Tric. Lucas wants to wear something to make him irresistible to Brooke. Haley dresses as Sandy from Grease in sexy black and a wig to try and get Nathan back. Nathan goes as Batman and they talk. Later, 'batman' kisses Haley and disappears. Later this is revealed to be Chris. Peyton struggles with whether to get to know Ellie given she may die ('everyone leaves'). Dan announces to Deb that he's running for Mayor, telling her he will give her the divorce if she stands by him throughout the campaign. Lucas dresses as Tommy Lee and meets a girl dressed as Pamela Anderson who flirts with him, making Brooke jealous. Later, Nathan asks Chris Keller to help Haley with her music and offers to pay him. Larry advises Peyton to talk to Ellie. This episode is named after a song by Bright Eyes.
50	5	"A Multitude of Casualties"	Thomas J. Wright	R. Lee Fleming, Jr	November 2, 2005	2T6155	3.03
Dan announces his run for Mayor at the Midnight Madness basketball game, when they retire his jersey. Peyton learns Ellie has been writing about meeting her for a possible article, which makes her furious. She asks Ellie to leave town. Karen surprises Dan by announcing her run for Mayor too. Lucas grows tired of Nathan ignoring Haley leading them to have a fight on the court: furious, Whitey makes them co-captains of the team. Brooke has a fight with a new cheerleader, Rachel Gatina, who is trying to steal her spotlight; she's also the girl whom Lucas met at the party. Unfortunately, Brooke has already set up the non-exclusive thing. She and Lucas argue. Nathan tells Haley if she can work with Chris and feel nothing towards him, maybe they can be together again, so she accepts Chris' offer to make music with him again. This episode is named after a song by The Hold Steady.
51	6	"Locked Hearts & Hand Grenades"	Marita Grabiak	James Stoteraux & Chad Fiveash	November 9, 2005	2T6156	3.42
When the cheerleaders start fighting over the same guys, Brooke throws a "Fantasy Boy Draft". Haley and Peyton argue about how they first behaved with Nathan. Haley and Chris work on her music. Trying to keep his heart condition a secret, Lucas struggles as taking meds slows him down. Haley realizes he hasn't told Whitey about his HCM, but Lucas says if Whitey discovered the truth he would be off the team. At the draft, Peyton surprisingly picks Mouth, Brooke picks Chris Keller, expecting Haley in third draw to pick Lucas. But Bevin swapped draw with Rachel and Rachel ends up picking before Haley. She picks Lucas to spite Brooke. Peyton feels bad for sending Ellie away. This episode is named after a song by Plan A Project.
52	7	"Champagne for My Real Friends, Real Pain for My Sham Friends"	Paul Johansson	Mark Schwahn	November 16, 2005	2T6157	3.52
The night of the Fantasy Date Draft, Haley is upset to be on a double date with Chris and Brooke as she wanted a private date alone with Nathan. During their date, Rachel tells Lucas to forget Brooke. Karen and Deb vandalize Dan's billboard but get stuck when their ladder falls away. Peyton and Mouth spend their date visiting Mouth's grandfather who has dementia and cannot remember his family. Haley brings Nathan up to the cafe roof and shows him the prediction she made as he writes one of his own. Brooke sees her clothes designs have been set out in the store she works in. To celebrate she gets very drunk. Right after though, Lucas goes to Brooke's apartment and walks into her room. Brooke wakes up but she is in bed with Chris. This episode is named after a song by Fall Out Boy.
53	8	"The Worst Day Since Yesterday"	John Asher	Mike Herro & David Strauss	November 30, 2005	2T6158	3.16
Lucas, mad at Brooke for sleeping with Keller, refuses to answer her calls. Karen does a radio interview for the election, but Dan ambushes it by calling her and asking unflattering questions. Peyton supports a hurt Lucas. Dan threatens to tell Whitey about Lucas's HCM if he does not pass the ball to Nathan. In the locker room, Lucas and Nathan begin arguing again. Peyton gives Haley a ride to the game and tells her she is sick of everyone leaving and that is the reason she has been mad at her: the two finally make amends. The Ravens lose the game. Dan comes in and berates the team. He pins Nathan to the wall just as Whitey walks. Mouth has filmed this and later gives it to Karen. After the game, Lucas ignores Brooke, while Haley waits for Nathan. Lucas stops at the river and angrily throws away his medication. This episode is named after a song by Flogging Molly.
54	9	"How a Resurrection Really Feels"	Greg Prange	Mark Schwahn	December 7, 2005	2T6159	3.33
After finding out she will not be paid for her clothes' design work, Brooke's steals the clothes from the store and Brooke, Peyton, and Haley find themselves behind bars. Lucas confronts Brooke about her sleeping with Chris. She apologizes, saying she is scared to open her heart again, but he says she's made it clear she doesn't care about him. Peyton is frantic after losing Ellie's cancer survivor bracelet. Despite the footage Karen uses showing Dan abusing his son, Dan wins the election after giving a contrite speech. Lucas meets with Deb, who admits she tried to kill Dan. Lucas warns her that Dan will find out and punish her, so she leaves Tree Hill. Nathan finds Haley and tells her he misses her and asks her if she wants to stay the night. Peyton finds Ellie's address. Brooke finds Lucas and says she wrote him a letter every day during the summer but never sent them. Lucas decides to forgive her, so the two get back together and start dating exclusively. This episode is named after a song by The Hold Steady.
55	10	"Brave New World"	John Asher	John A. Norris	January 11, 2006	2T6160	3.23
Lucas and Peyton take a road trip together to find Ellie. Brooke tries to trust Lucas and Peyton but finds it hard. While out of town, Lucas reconnects with a friend, Faith, from his past. They play basketball at a park court, and it reminds him how much fun he used to have. Deb tells Nathan she tried to kill Dan, and they need to get away. Brooke, Haley and Mouth successfully launch the Clothes Over Bros' website, only to find that demand far exceeds supply. She ropes in the cheerleaders to help but bullies them as she stresses out. Peyton shows up to Ellie's house and asks for help with Haley's charity record and asks about her cancer status. This episode is named after a song by Iron Maiden from the album of the same name.
56	11	"Return of the Future"	Bethany Rooney	Terrence Coli	January 18, 2006	2T6161	2.67
The Ravens lose their second game in a row, which leads Whitey to make the boys clean up a dilapidated old court. Dan suggests to Nathan that Haley might be trying to get pregnant when he realizes the night they reconciled they did not use a condom. After being gone for six months, Keith returns and reconnects with Lucas and Karen. Brooke receives a mysterious letter inviting her to a fashion showcase in New York - later she sees it is the same weekend as a big game/ cheerleading date. Keith and Karen reconnect and when he asks her about Andy, she replies that he was not the man for her. Peyton and Ellie bond over their passion for music. Lucas agrees to write letters to Brooke like she did for him during the summer, to get to know one another better. This episode is named after a song by Scooter.
57	12	"I've Got Dreams to Remember"	Stuart Gillard	Mike Herro & David Strauss	January 25, 2006	2T6162	2.70
The students meet with the guidance counselor. Nathan and Haley realize they want to attend colleges which are thousands of miles away apart. Keith is questioned by police for the fire, but cannot be held as they have no evidence, then he asks Karen out on their first date to the Ravens game. Peyton has never thought of going to college but Ellie says she could see her studying art, music, or business. At the game, Whitey forces Nathan to sit out the game. Near the end of the game, Nathan talks to Lucas and reminds him to put the ball in the dead spot. Lucas takes his advice and the Ravens win the game. A scout approves. Brooke does not want to talk about college because she is successful at high school. Ellie shows Peyton a possible cover for the charity CD called "Friends With Benefit". Keith, Karen, and Lucas enjoy a meal while Dan watches. Keith goes outside to tell him to go home. This episode is named after a song by Otis Redding.
58	13	"The Wind That Blew My Heart Away"	David Jackson	Stacy Rukeyser	February 1, 2006	2T6163	3.01
A violent rainstorm hits Tree Hill, causing a blackout. Lucas and Brooke begin arguing due to a letter he signed off using the exact words he had used the year before in one for Peyton. Nathan and Haley, have a serious conversation about their issues and make out on a car bonnet in the rain. Mouth is at Rachel's and she gives him mixed signals eventually wanting to kiss him. He says no as she only wants to because they're in the dark and she won't want to kiss him tomorrow. Peyton tells Ellie she is scared of her not surviving cancer, but Ellie tries to reassure her. Peyton talks about how she loved Lucas but let him go and now she realized it was a big mistake: Ellie tells her it is never too late. Keith and Karen are at the cafe and make love for the first time. The day after, Peyton goes to see Ellie, but is shocked to find her dead. This episode is named after a song by Fruit Bats.
59	14	"All Tomorrow's Parties"	David Paymer	Anna Lotto	February 8, 2006	2T6164	2.89
Peyton and Haley take a road trip to New York with Brooke for the fashion show, but after one night in the city at a club with an underage model wasted on drugs, Brooke decides to leave. The basketball team and cheerleaders road trip to the cheer competition. Rachel gets Peyton drunk and leaves her at the hotel room Lucas is in. Peyton wakes to find she is in bed with Lucas. Nathan and Lucas go to dinner with Tony Battle, an old friend of Nathan and see a happy family together with a great father. Karen considers an impromptu marriage proposal to Keith. This episode is named after a song by The Velvet Underground and Nico.
60	15	"Just Watch the Fireworks"	Billy Dickson	James Stoteraux & Chad Fiveash	February 15, 2006	2T6165	2.85
Clips of the students' time capsule from Junior year are leaked and played on TVs all over school. This results in embarrassment for many of the Tree Hill gang, but also a reconnection in old friends. One student, Jimmy Edwards, sounds very angry, hurt and disturbed. During the charity night (for breast cancer research) to launch the CD, Peyton flirts with Fall Out Boy songwriter Pete Wentz at Tric. Keith asks to adopt Lucas. The concert features performances by Haley, Fall Out Boy, and Jack's Mannequin. The show references Jack's Mannequin singer, Andrew McMahon, and his real life battle with leukemia. This episode is named after a song by Jimmy Eat World.
61	16	"With Tired Eyes, Tired Minds, Tired Souls, We Slept"	Greg Prange	Mark Schwahn	March 1, 2006	2T6166	3.36
Jimmy Edwards, a bullied student at Tree Hill High, who used to be friends with Lucas and Skills, is depressed after the leaking of the time capsule. He goes to school with a gun and, after yet more abuse, fires at a doorway, shattering glass and hitting Peyton in the leg. The school is put in lockdown while Jimmy takes Haley and other students hostage in the tutor centre. Outside, Brooke is desperate because she has lost Peyton and tells Lucas. He and Nathan rush into the school to save Peyton and Haley respectively. Lucas finds Peyton wounded in the library and stays with her. Believing she will not survive because of the blood loss, she says she loves him and kisses him. Then she passes out and Lucas carries her out. Jimmy threatens them. Keith enters the building and assists Lucas and Peyton in escaping by trying to calm Jimmy, who shoots himself. Dan arrives, picks up Jimmy's gun and shoots Keith, killing him. This episode is named after a song by Explosions in the Sky.
62	17	"Who Will Survive, and What Will Be Left of Them"	John Asher	Mark Schwahn	March 29, 2006	2T6167	2.83
Two weeks have passed. Peyton has recovered from her injury, Lucas and Karen are mourning Keith and everyone is still traumatized. Brooke throws a party at school to bring everyone together. Lucas thinks it's disrespectful for Keith: the two have another fight. Both Lucas and Peyton meet again in the library: they agree the kiss meant nothing so as not to hurt Brooke. Nathan and Haley agree they're lucky to have each other because life is short. Brooke tells Peyton it's obvious that Lucas loves her more than her. This episode is named after an album by Murder by Death. The title is also the tagline of the 1974 horror movie The Texas Chain Saw Massacre.
63	18	"When It Isn't Like It Should Be"	Paul Johansson	R. Lee Fleming, Jr.	April 5, 2006	2T6168	2.93
Karen is still grieving. Trying to recover from the shooting, the gang goes to spend a weekend in the mountains in Rachel's family 'cabin'. Nathan proposes again to Haley, who happily accepts. Brooke discovers something about Rachel's past, while Peyton makes out with Pete Wentz, after he turned up and made everyone breakfast. This episode is named after a song by Saves the Day.
64	19	"I Slept with Someone in Fall Out Boy and All I Got Was This Stupid Song Written About Me"	Moira Kelly	William H. Brown	April 12, 2006	2T6169	2.76
Seeing how Keith's death has been for Karen and realising he has been putting his life at risk, Lucas decides to tell her, Whitey and Nathan the truth about his heart condition, then quits the team because continuing to play is too dangerous. He and Brooke grow more distant. Nathan and Haley begin organizing their wedding, while Brooke uses what she's discovered at the cabin to take revenge on Rachel (she used to be a fat child). Peyton's father turns Pete away from the house when he shows up at 1 am. Peyton listens to an advice he gives her: she should go for a guy who treats her well and she really loves. Instead of using a plane ticket Pete has left for her, she goes to Savannah to find Jake, thinking it could be what her heart wants. This episode is named after a song by Fall Out Boy.
65	20	"Everyday Is a Sunday Evening"	Billy Dickson	Mark Schwahn	April 19, 2006	2T6170	2.67
Lucas and Karen have left Tree Hill to visit some potential colleges. During the playoff night for the Ravens, with Lucas gone, Nathan has to lead the team to the win alone. Peyton is spending some time in Savannah with Jake and the two rekindle their relationship: feeling happy with him and Jenny and seeing a good art college in town, she asks to stay and proposes to him. This episode is named after an album by The Blackouts.
66	21	"Over the Hills and Far Away"	Thomas J. Wright	Mark Schwahn	April 26, 2006	2T6171	2.87
Jake accepts Peyton's proposal, but then hears her saying in her sleep she loves Lucas. He says she has lost two mothers and now wants to be a mother - be part of a family. Jake tells her she needs to go home and clear her mind about who she truly loves. Brooke organizes a show at Nathan and Haley's rehearsal dinner to relive their love story. Lucas returns and Brooke says that she hasn't missed him like she used to, realizing she is not so dependent on him. During the show, Peyton has to step in to play Haley in a scene where she and Lucas, who plays Nathan, say they love each other. Peyton tears up as she realizes that Lucas is the one for her. At the end of the night, Peyton decides to tell a shocked Brooke that she is still in love with Lucas. This episode is named after a song by Led Zeppelin and another by Gary Moore which was covered by Nightwish.
67	22	"The Show Must Go On"	Mark Schwahn	Mark Schwahn	May 3, 2006	2T6172	3.06
It's Nathan and Haley's second wedding day. After Peyton's confession, she and Brooke have a huge argument, ending their friendship. At the wedding, Lucas, thinking she already knew, lets it slip with Brooke about the kiss with Peyton, leading to yet another fight between them. Lucas says Peyton thought she was dying and the kiss was part of that, but Brooke responds that a kiss always means something. Lucas then reminds Brooke how he forgave her for sleeping with Keller. After the wedding, Deb tells Dan she tried to kill him, not Keith. Rachel gets drunk, exposes Cooper during the speeches, then steals the limo. Cooper drives after her and persuades her to let him drive the limo back, but approaching a bridge, they fight — she says she's pregnant, grabs the wheel, and takes the limo off a bridge. Nathan dives in. Karen tells Lucas she is pregnant with Keith's child. Lucas has found a pregnancy kit in a purse, but it is not his mother's. This episode is named after a song by Queen.

== Ratings ==
Season	Timeslot	Season premiere	Season finale	TV season	Rank	Viewers (in millions)	Rating
3	Wednesday 8/7C	October 5, 2005	May 3, 2006	2005–2006	#137	3.07	1.2

== DVD release ==
The DVD release of season three was released after the season has completed broadcast on television. It has been released in Regions 1, 2 and 4. As well as every episode from the season, the DVD release features bonus material such as audio commentaries on some episodes from the creator and cast, deleted scenes, gag reels and behind-the-scenes featurettes.

The Complete Third Season
Set details			Special features
22 episodes; 937 minutes (Region 1); 968 minutes (Region 2); 900 minutes (Region 4); 6-disc set; 1.78:1 aspect ratio; Languages: English (Dolby Digital 2.0 Surround); Subtitles: Spanish and French (Region 1); English, Danish, Finnish, Portuguese, Norwegian, Swedish, English for the Hearing Impaired (Regions 2 and 4)			Audio commentaries: "With Tired Eyes, Tired Minds, Tired Souls, We Slept" - with creator/executive producer/writer Mark Schwahn, executive producer Joe Davola, actors Colin Fickes, Sophia Bush, Lee Norris and music supervisor Lindsey Wolfington; "The Show Must Go On" - with creator/executive producer/writer/director Mark Schwahn, executive producer Joe Davola, actors Sophia Bush and Lee Norris; Deleted scenes: Episodes: 2, 3, 4, 5, 9, 10, 14, 15, 16, 17, 20 & 22; "Anatomy of an Episode: A Behind-the-Scenes Look at the Creation of "With Tired Eyes, Tired Minds, Tired Souls, We Slept"; Gag reel
Release dates
United States	United Kingdom	Australia	
September 26, 2006	October 23, 2006	July 4, 2007	
