= One Tree Hill season 4 =

One Tree Hill
- Season 4
- One Tree Hill Season 4 DVD cover
- No. of episodes: 21

Release
- Original network: The CW
- Original release: September 27, 2006 – June 13, 2007

Season chronology
- ← Previous; Season 3 Next → Season 5

The fourth season of One Tree Hill began airing on September 27, 2006. The season concluded on June 13, 2007, after 21 episodes. This is the first season to air on the newly formed The CW television network.

Season four rose in ratings, becoming #133 in the Nielsen ratings system with 1.3 rating and averaging 2.99 million viewers. Episode #10 "Songs To Love and Die By" was the highest rated episode of the season by having 4.24 million viewers tuning in and the most viewed among the entire series after season 2 along with the previous one, "Some You Give Away", which had 4.21 million viewers tuning in.

The season had a brief hiatus for three months from February 2007 to May 2007, to make their timeslot available for the short-lived series Pussycat Dolls Present: The Search for the Next Doll. The show returned May 2, 2007 to air the last 6 episodes of the season. This marked the first and only season of the show to air into June.

In this season, most episodes were named after rock albums rather than after songs.

== Cast and characters ==
=== Main ===
- Chad Michael Murray as Lucas Scott
- James Lafferty as Nathan Scott
- Hilarie Burton as Peyton Sawyer
- Bethany Joy Galeotti as Haley James Scott
- Paul Johansson as Dan Scott
- Sophia Bush as Brooke Davis
- Barbara Alyn Woods as Deb Scott
- Lee Norris as Mouth McFadden
- Antwon Tanner as Skills Taylor
- Danneel Harris as Rachel Gatina
- Barry Corbin as Whitey Durham
- Moira Kelly as Karen Roe

=== Recurring ===
- Bevin Prince as Bevin Mirskey
- Stephen Colletti as Chase Adams
- Kelsey Chow as Gigi Silveri
- Matt Barr as Ian Banks
- Vaughn Wilson as Fergie Thompson
- Cullen Moss as Junk Moretti
- Elisabeth Harnois as Shelley Simon
- Ernest Waddell as Derek Sommers
- Rick Fox as Daunte Jones
- Allison Scagliotti as Abby Brown
- Michael Trucco as Cooper Lee
- Amber Wallace as Glenda Farrell
- Shawn Shepard as Principal Turner
- Mary Kate Englehardt as Lily Roe Scott

=== Special guest star ===
- Craig Sheffer as Keith Scott
- Tyler Hilton as Chris Keller
- Lupe Fiasco as himself

== Episodes ==
| No. overall | No. in season | Title | Directed by | Written by | Original release date | Prod. code | U.S. viewers (millions) |
|---|---|---|---|---|---|---|---|
| 68 | 1 | "The Same Deep Water as You" | Greg Prange | Mark Schwahn | September 27, 2006 | 3T5751 | 3.44 |
All three people in the drowned car are taken to hospital, but Cooper is in a coma. Haley tells the police she saw Rachel grab the steering wheel. Rachel worries what Cooper will say if/when he wakes up. Dan offers his help to Karen now that she is pregnant. She is wary he has not changed. Because Brooke severed her friendship with Peyton, she has nowhere to live. Rachel invites her to share her mansion. Cooper wakes up and tells the police the accident was his fault. Skills decides to try out for the Ravens and Whitey watches him at the river court. Brooke breaks up with Lucas, feeling they have grown too far apart. Dan threatens Deb, who turns to pills again. Nathan reveals it wasn't him who saved Rachel, but Keith. Peyton's stalker "watchmewatchu" returns and sends her a threatening message. Brooke calls Haley and the two go to the doctors office, where the doctor is seen telling one of them they are pregnant. This episode is named after a song by The Cure.
| 69 | 2 | "Things I Forgot at Birth" | Greg Prange | Mark Schwahn | October 4, 2006 | 3T5752 | 3.09 |
Skills is given a place on the Ravens' team. Peyton struggles to hide her feelings for Lucas, who still wants Brooke. Brooke has no one but Rachel to celebrate her 18th birthday with. Deb, while working at the cafe high on painkillers, fumbles with her purse and a gun falls out. It goes off shattering the front door, leading Karen to confront her and she quits. Peyton takes Lucas to the mall they used to go to on Brooke's birthdays. They wait for ages then leave - at which point Brooke sees them but does not reveal herself. Meanwhile, Nathan struggles with memories and nightmares of the accident, where he thinks he saw Keith. Peyton finds a note in Ellie's favorite album saying she has a half-brother. She tries to contact him, but he refuses to talk to her. Dan continues to be haunted by the ghost of Keith as a child and tries to make amends now he knows Deb tried to kill him not Keith. Word gets out around Tree Hill that Brooke is pregnant. Graffiti appears on Dan's walls saying 'murderer'. Karen finds Dan has refurbished Lucas' cradle for her baby. Peyton's brother appears on her doorstep. This episode is named after a song by Absentee.
| 70 | 3 | "Good News for People Who Love Bad News" | John Asher | Mike Herro & David Strauss | October 11, 2006 | 3T5753 | 3.25 |
Peyton's brother, Derek, shows up at her house but she sends him away, due to him blowing her off. After some thought, she decides to get to know him and invites him to a party that night after the game. Skills helps the Ravens win the area championship and they qualify for state. At the party, Lucas stops pursuing Brooke, telling her he was wrong: he is not the guy for her. Nathan is disturbed by bad dreams and the belief that he saw Keith in the water during the accident. Rachel pursues Nathan, ostensibly because she wants to thank him for saving her life. She also says she saw Keith as well. Derek, a photographer, gives Peyton a picture he took of her at the party. Rachel tells Brooke she knows she's pregnant, but will keep her secret, which Mouth overhears. Lucas and Mouth question if they should have ever left the River Court. After the party, Brooke lies awake in tears, Dan lies awake watching Keith, struggling to get rid of him, as Peyton hangs her picture from Derek up. As Derek does the same, he hangs it up on a wall covered in thousands of pictures that he has taken of her over time, without her even knowing. This episode is named after an album by Modest Mouse.
| 71 | 4 | "Can't Stop This Thing We've Started" | Bethany Rooney | Terrence Coli | October 18, 2006 | 3T5754 | 2.97 |
Lucas has concerns over Derek's pushy behavior. The entire school is talking about Brooke's pregnancy, Rachel thinks she should have an abortion. A ‘Clean Teen’ girl, Shelly, begs Brooke not to have an abortion. Nathan buys a motorcycle despite Haley's reservations, and Rachel poses for Maxim magazine. Nathan tells Deb to choose-the pills or him- and she chooses the pills. Upset, he accidentally crashes his bike. Karen and Whitey reveal to Lucas has that he can play basketball again if he takes his medication and plays only 15 minutes a game. Lucas refuses as it would be too hard to only play part of a game. At Tric, Derek lies to Peyton, saying he heard Lucas tell Brooke if she took him back, he would never talk to her again. Peyton finds Lucas and tells him about the pregnancy and tells him if Brooke is pregnant then it's goodbye, leaving Lucas confused. Brooke learns Shelly had an abortion and she is still traumatized over it. Lucas confronts Peyton about what Derek said and they learn Derek lied to her. Dan continues to struggle with hallucinations and realizes he may still love Karen. Haley tells Lucas she is pregnant. Derek hires a prostitute, who wears Peyton's stolen jacket and a wig. Derek takes off his shirt to reveal a tattoo across his back of Peyton dressed as the angel of death. This episode is named after a song by Bryan Adams. Lupe Fiasco Guest stars
| 72 | 5 | "I Love You But I've Chosen Darkness" | Stuart Gillard | Mark Schwahn | October 25, 2006 | 3T5755 | 3.67 |
Nathan is offered a basketball scholarship at Duke which Dan tells him to accept. However, Haley is pregnant, initially leaving Nathan shocked. Later at a press conference he disappoints Dan by saying he has to discuss what to do with his wife who is pregnant. Brooke goes on a date set up by Rachel with a male model, Nick, who thinks she is 23. They sleep together and it is later revealed he is a teacher. Peyton learns Derek has been stalking her via the webcam and is not her brother. Lucas alerts the police. Peyton is attacked by 'Derek' at home, who has covered her room in thousands of pictures of her. Derek reveals it was him messaging her all along and is in love with her. Lucas arrives and fights with Derek, who gets the upper hand and prepares to kill Lucas. Her real brother - the real Derek who was initially arrested by the police – comes to the house and hits 'Derek', freeing Peyton. Then Lucas and Derek throw 'Derek' out of the window. The Police arrive but 'Derek' has disappeared. Nathan accepts a car as a gift from a man, Daunte, who claims to be a Ravens fan. Dan finds another note on his wall ‘Genesis 4:10.’, which is about murder. He tells himself it is like the rest and all in his head until Whitey stops by and reveals he can see it too. This episode is named after the band I Love You But I've Chosen Darkness.
| 73 | 6 | "Where Did You Sleep Last Night?" | Paul Johansson | William H. Brown | November 8, 2006 | 3T5756 | 3.56 |
Knee-high in debt and almost homeless, Nathan is forced to reach out to Dan for help, who denies it. Daunte continues to mysteriously talk to Nathan, but Nathan wants little to do with him. Nick is revealed to be Brooke's teacher. Rachel thinks he will drop Brooke now, but the affair continues. Deb is desperate for drugs. She threatens to take the cafe from Karen when Karen tells her to leave. Peyton is traumatized by the attack and won't go to school. Her real brother, a black guy who is a marine, trains her in self-defense and builds up her confidence. But he says he doesn't want to continue a relationship. Lucas returns to the Ravens to play for only fifteen-minute stints to protect his heart. The team advance in the playoffs for the state championship. Nathan thanks Daunte for lending him the money as Daunte tells him to keep him happy when he plays. This episode is named after an American folk song made famous by Lead Belly and latterly covered first by Nirvana and then by Hole.
| 74 | 7 | "All These Things That I've Done" | David Jackson | Adele Lim | November 15, 2006 | 3T5757 | 3.15 |
Peyton tries to get back to normal, but still has PTSD and runs out of school. Brooke's clothes are a hit at the local fashion show and Mouth is hit on by a model. But the party she invites him to clashes with the date he has made with Gigi. Deb lies to her doctor, then fakes prescriptions to support her addiction. Dan tells her to sign over the cafe to Karen. Mouth chooses Gigi over the model. Principal Turner finds out about Nick's affair, from Rachel. Brooke hopes to continue, but finds Nick cheating on her and she dumps him. Peyton decides to stay with Lucas, still scared to be alone. Nathan is cornered by Daunte - he either pays Daunte 15K for the car or throws the Ravens game (not to lose, but win with a fewer than 10-point difference). Nathan is benched and Lucas has to fail baskets to save Nathan from Daunte's threats of hurting him. Later at the River Court, Lucas says he can never do it again. Nathan walks off as Lucas watches Daunte’s car pull away from the river court. This episode is named after a song by The Killers.
| 75 | 8 | "Nothing Left to Say But Goodbye" | Janice Cooke | John A. Norris | November 22, 2006 | 3T5758 | 2.53 |
Daunte wants Nathan to lose the state championship, but he refuses. Daunte later visits Haley at the cafe and Nathan is worried. He follows them out and says it's over, but they threaten to break his knee if he won't throw the game. Nathan, who is getting MVP at the annual banquet that night, goes to see Whitey, who is receiving the ‘Lifetime Achievement Award.’ Whitey confesses he wants to win badly. Rachel asks Haley to tutor her when she fails a class, but she refuses. Dan asks Karen to go with him to the awards ceremony, not as a date. Brooke asks Lucas and he says yes. Peyton asks Derek, who says yes and reveals he's leaving town that night. At the banquet, Brooke tries to make Peyton jealous as she flirts with Lucas. Whitey gives his speech about how important is to find the right person to spend your life with. Nathan tells Dan about Daunte. Dan confronts Daunte, asking how much he wants, but he threatens Lucas, Karen, Deb, and Hailey. Lucas walks Brooke home as they both conclude not to get back together, stating that Whitey’s speech made them understand they don’t belong together. Haley agrees to tutor Rachel but says she will never like her. Dan tells Nathan he will lose the state championship. Lucas goes to see Peyton, who finally tells him she’s in love with him. This episode is named after a song by Audioslave.
| 76 | 9 | "Some You Give Away" | Greg Prange | Mark Schwahn | November 29, 2006 | 3T5759 | 4.15 |
It's the state championship and Whitey's final game. Lucas tells Skills that Nathan will throw it so they need to keep the ball to themselves. Lucas does not take his meds. Karen is driving Deb to the game but when she sees she's taken pills and passed out, she drives her to a rehab clinic. Haley has abdominal pain and is taken to the hospital where she discovers she is ok and the baby is a boy. At half-time Nathan asks Haley whether it would be 'enough' if this was his last game. She says yes, so long as he is a good husband and father. Nathan goes on court and plays to win. Afterwards everyone celebrates and Brooke asks Lucas who he would want by his side as his dreams come true. He finally realizes it is Peyton and he and Brooke split amicably. After hugging, Peyton tells Lucas she'll be seeing him, just like he told her in the Pilot, prompting him to confess her she is the one for him, then the two share a long-awaited kiss in the middle of the court, getting together officially. Back in Tree Hill, Nathan walks into the road with Haley, and Daunte's car dives towards them. Haley shoves Nathan out of the way and is hit. Nathan runs to the car which has crashed and drags out an unconscious Daunte. He punches him, but Dan intervenes, finding him dead, and sends him away and punches his own fist into the road to cover for his son. Lucas collapses - he has suffered a heart attack. This episode is named after a song by La Rocca.
| 77 | 10 | "Songs to Love and Die By" | John Asher | Mark Schwahn | December 6, 2006 | 3T5760 | 4.24 |
While in a coma, Lucas is visited by the spirit of Keith who shows him how one life can affect the lives of others, in a nod to "It's a Wonderful Life". Lucas wonders if his life made a difference, and Keith shows him that it did. He saved Peyton's life during the shooting and saved Brooke guilt. Lucas considers going to the afterlife, but Keith shows him a future where Peyton mourned him all her life, and he decides to stay, realizing he changed her life and needs to tell her he loves her. In real life, Nathan waits at the hospital and is feeling very guilty - Haley and the baby might die, and so might Lucas. He thinks if 'Keith' had not saved him from drowning then he would have never met Daunte, and his wife and brother would not have ended up in the hospital. Once Haley is out of surgery, he visits Dan who is in jail. Nathan wants to own up but Dan won't let him. Keith visits Dan in jail and scares him. Haley wakes up and the baby still has a heartbeat. Peyton asks Brooke if they can be friends again, and she says they can, but not like they used to be. In Lucas' coma, Keith continuously takes him to the school hallway the day of the shooting and tells Lucas, who doesn't believe Jimmy killed him, to open his eyes. Lucas wakes up. This episode is named after an album by 8mm.
| 78 | 11 | "Everything in Its Right Place" | Michael Lange | Dawn Urbont | January 17, 2007 | 3T5761 | 2.20 |
Lucas returns to his everyday life, ready to live his new relationship with Peyton, who instead is scared of losing him due to his heart attack. Brooke has worked for her math test even though Rachel tells her to use the stolen key to cheat. She fails and decides to take Rachel's advice. This leads them to be in school at night and have to pretend to join the Clean Teen group to avoid the principal's wrath. Haley feels sorry for the driver of the car that hit her as he is dead – she believes Dan killed him. When she says she wants to visit Daunte's family, Nathan tells her the truth and she is hurt and betrayed by his lies. In jail, Dan wants to plead guilty to pay for his other murder. Deb resists rehab conversations and then leaves. Gigi tells Mouth she will break up with him. Dan is released as the cause of death for Daunte was found to be internal injuries from the crash. Haley and Nathan reconcile. Mouth accepts that Gigi needs to spend time with her own year group as he will leave at the end of the year. After Lucas finally tells her he loves her, Peyton is able to overcome her fear and she and Lucas kiss in the hallway at school. This episode is named after a song by Radiohead.
| 79 | 12 | "Resolve" | Moira Kelly | Michelle Furtney-Goodman | January 24, 2007 | 3T5762 | 2.23 |
Lucas continues to question what Keith meant in his coma and confides in Karen that he doesn't think Jimmy killed Keith. Haley is frustrated over her injuries and has outgrown the dress she wanted to wear to prom. Deb pushes past Haley to try and see her son, but she is high and careless and knocks her to the ground. Nathan is furious. Later, Deb overdoses and tries to commit suicide, but she is saved in time by Dan. Skills and Mouth help Nathan learn to dance in order to earn money at an amateur strip night. They win and he buys Haley a new dress. Chase, a Clean Teen, thinks Brooke has an A in calculus and asks to be tutored by her. She agrees as a trade for a date. They kiss. Lucas and Peyton finally find happiness in their relationship. This episode is named after a song by Foo Fighters.
| 80 | 13 | "Pictures of You" | Les Butler | Mark Schwahn | February 7, 2007 | 3T5763 | 2.73 |
A teacher believes his class stereotypes one another as jocks, prom queens, nerds, loners and sluts - but they use the word 'friendly'. Drawing names from a hat they follow an assignment to get to know each other better and then take a photograph of one another. Brooke is with Chase and admits cheating at calculus. He is angry but later he kisses her when he realizes she believes she is 'never enough'. Skills gets Haley. Lucas gets Glenda (a goth girl he's never spoken to before). Peyton gets Nathan. Mouth gets Clean Teen leader Shelly who explains she was betrayed by the boy she fell for at summer camp and isn't a virgin. They later kiss. This episode is named after a song by The Cure.
| 81 | 14 | "Sad Songs for Dirty Lovers" | Janice Cooke | William H. Brown | February 14, 2007 | 3T5764 | 2.25 |
Haley confronts Brooke over the stolen calculus test and Brooke lies. Lucas and Peyton consider having sex for the first time, but want it to be special. Victoria's Secret wants to take on Brooke's designs but there is a morals clause and her cheating would count, so Rachel tells her to keep quiet and she will take the blame. Deb is back in rehab and admits she's scared of coming out and being alone. Principal Turner fires Haley because it was her key that was stolen. Nathan and Haley decide to move into Debs' house to save money. Nathan throws a party at his house to use all the booze before Deb gets home. Dan asks Karen to chaperone the prom with him. At the party, Shelly and Mouth have sex, but she runs off after and breaks up with him. Haley slaps Rachel for getting her fired, who runs off in tears. She later tells Brooke that the principal knows it was her. Peyton tells Lucas that, unlike the first time when she made the mistake of walking away from that room one year before, now she wants what he wanted; everything with him. Rachel is at home and puts the picture of the cheerleaders in a box labeled "Tree Hill High" and places it next to boxes of all the different schools she has been to. A basketball tape of Nathan's scores is played, but it was actually recorded over a sex tape from two years ago, of Nathan and Brooke, leaving everyone shocked. This episode is named after an album by The National.
| 82 | 15 | "Prom Night at Hater High" | Paul Johansson | Mike Herro & David Strauss | February 21, 2007 | 3T5765 | 2.89 |
Brooke was drunk when she slept with Nathan, and Peyton had just dumped him. Peyton and Haley are still furious and feel betrayed over the event. Peyton takes Brooke's prom dress as revenge, but Brooke comes to her house to get it and they fight physically until Brooke says 'you win' because Peyton is going to prom with a guy she loves, whereas Chase has dumped Brooke because he had been betrayed by a girlfriend and friend. Peyton tells Brooke she had the worst year of her life, and she needed her, but now, they're done. Rachel has been expelled and will fly out to join her parents on vacation. Mouth says she keeps getting expelled in order to see her parents. Haley asks for a list of all Nathan's past sexual encounters, but Nathan gives her a list of the girls he's loved: only her. Deb asks Haley to forgive Nathan and blames herself and Dan for being terrible role models. Brooke and Rachel say goodbye, and Brooke thanks her for being her friend. Peyton says she'll skip prom, but Lucas waits for her. Karen goes to prom with Dan to chaperone and Lucas calls him "dad" for the first time. Peyton opens her door for Lucas, but finds Psycho Derek, who punches her as the screen goes black. This episode is named after a song by The Long Winters.
| 83 | 16 | "You Call It Madness, But I Call It Love" | Thomas J. Wright | Terrence Coli | May 2, 2007 | 3T5766 | 3.25 |
Derek sedates Peyton and ties her up in the basement. Brooke goes to check on Peyton, but Psycho Derek captures her too. Lucas goes to prom alone and hangs out with Glenda, who helps him realize why he cannot remember everything from the shooting. Dan continues to charm Karen but finds a note from the shooting witness that says they are watching him. Rachel tries to crash prom, looking for friends. Mouth leaves with her and they slow dance at the airport and decide to run away together. Peyton convinces Psycho Derek to let her kill Brooke, but she stabs him. Horror movie tropes kick in, but eventually defeat and push him down the stairs before calling 911. After the police arrive and arrest 'Derek' for good, Brooke and Peyton reconcile. Nathan and Haley revisit the café’s rooftop, where Nathan shows her his prediction he made, predicting they’d be together again. Brooke wins Prom Queen. Dan finds himself taunted by mysterious messages and traces them to a phone found where the gun was the day of the shooting. Lucas confides in him, but Dan says Jimmy killed Keith and to open his eyes. Echoing Keith's message to open his eyes, Lucas flashes back to the last time he saw Keith and finally remembers he saw Abby hiding in the hallway that day. Within Reason perform at Prom. This episode is named after a song by Nat King Cole.
| 84 | 17 | "It Gets the Worst at Night" | Greg Prange | Mark Schwahn & Jim Lee | May 9, 2007 | 3T5767 | 2.95 |
A week has passed since Prom, and Brooke and Peyton are sharing a bed with Lucas because they don't want to be alone. Dan orders his assistant to trace the identity of the phone's owner. Mouth texts the others for help - he is in jail in Honey Grove, Texas for sleeping in a park, after ditching Rachel because he realized that there'd always be someone else to flirt with. The gang decide to take a road trip and rescue him. On the way there, their car breaks down but they are rescued by Chris Keller's Tour Bus. In town, they get a second chance to have a perfect prom by crashing the local prom. During the night, Lucas and Peyton finally have sex for the first time. Brooke catches them after, making her feel alone due to losing Chase. Not wanting to spend the night alone, she talks with Chris all night long. Brooke tells Haley she is the one who cheated in the calculus exam, not Rachel, and Haley is furious but later forgives her. Dan spends the night at Karen's house, after she thought someone broke in. Back home, Nathan tells Lucas investigators are asking questions about him shaving points. Peyton and Brooke move into the apartment. Lucas finds Abby's address and goes to her door, just as Dan has also found her identity, and watches from afar. This episode is named after a song by Lucero. Tyler Hiton Guest stars
| 85 | 18 | "The Runaway Found" | David Jackson | Mark Schwahn | May 16, 2007 | 3T5768 | 2.68 |
Lucas finds Abby and asks if Jimmy shot Keith, but her mother shows up and tells Lucas to leave. Abby and her mother, scared of Dan, have been pretending that Abby is crazy. Peyton, still haunted by the memories of 'Derek' decides to face her fear by visiting him in jail; but leaves when he begins to taunt her. The next day both her and Brooke discover that 'Derek' is actually Ian Banks, a surviving victim from a car accident that killed his girlfriend, who looked just like Peyton. The girls then visit Ian in jail and confronts him about his past and his actions to Peyton. However despite what Ian did, Peyton forgives him and tells him that they will never see each other ever again before leaving with Brooke, finally getting over her trauma. Lucas confesses to Whitey that it was him who shaved points, but Whitey watches taped game footage and sees Lucas exchange looks with Nathan, realizing it was for Nathan. An erratic Dan forces his way into Abby's house and terrifies her and her mother. Later that night, Abby sneaks in Lucas' room and tells him what she saw on the day of the shooting, while confessing she hoped to make him confess by leaving messages. The next morning, she and her mother have left town. Nathan holds a press conference and confesses to point shaving. Dan, feeling he has lost everything, cries to Karen, ending with them kissing, just as Lucas sees them together. This episode is named after an album by The Veils.
| 86 | 19 | "Ashes of Dreams You Let Die" | Michael Lange | John A. Norris | May 30, 2007 | 3T5769 | 2.06 |
Lucas bursts in and attacks Dan, saying he shot Keith. Karen denies this. Peyton is offered a summer internship at Sire Records in Los Angeles. Brooke tries to reconnect with Chase through yearbook signatures. Due to Nathan's scandal, Haley's valedictorian speech offer is rescinded. Dan suggests that Lucas get professional help with his 'theories' about Keith's death. Whitey tells Nathan that Duke has rescinded his scholarship. Whitey tells him to fight for a place somewhere. Karen suggests therapy to Lucas, still not believing Lucas' story. Brooke writes her true feelings in Chase's yearbook hoping he will do the same. He does not but later goes to her apartment and kisses her. Haley tells Lucas that Debs keeps a gun in a cookie jar and Lucas steals it. Peyton confronts Lucas about the internship in LA, he tells her to take it. Mouth is upset that Jimmy has been left out of the yearbook. He and Gigi make one to take to Jimmy's mother and Mouth asks everyone to sign it. Principal Turner allows Haley to give her speech and Whitey calls Duke on Nathan's behalf. Dan gets a text from Abby saying she's telling the police. Dan says he has 'a problem to take care of' to Karen and gets up to leave. Lucas enters with the gun saying he sent the text and he is protecting his mother. Karen, stressed by the day's events, experiences pain and collapses. Dan tries to check on her, angering Lucas who threatens to kill him. As Dan tries to tend to Karen, Lucas fires the gun as the screen goes black. This episode is named after a song by B. J. Thomas.
| 87 | 20 | "The Birth and Death of the Day" | Greg Prange | Mark Schwahn | June 6, 2007 | 3T5770 | 2.21 |
Lucas deliberately missed Dan but says he'll hit him next time. Karen goes to the hospital with eclampsia - she and the baby might die. Deb notices the gun has gone missing and accuses Lucas of attempted murder, who explains everything and Deb believes him. He gives her the gun and she says she will stay with Karen. Later, Karen's doctor performs a Caesarean and she gives birth to a healthy baby girl. Nathan asks Skills if he can take the factory job Skills would have had without his basketball scholarship and works his first day there. Chase and Brooke confess their love to each other. Brooke owns up to cheating but is not expelled, and Rachel is allowed to graduate in absentia. After Deb tells him, Nathan asks Dan about shooting Keith and Dan can't say he didn't. Nathan promises Dan he will never be a part of his life again. Whitey takes a coaching job at a college three hours away and can therefore offer Nathan a place in college. Karen flatlines. Dan stands outside a police station thinking. During her valedictorian speech, Haley goes into labor. This episode is named after a song by The Veils.
| 88 | 21 | "All of a Sudden I Miss Everyone" | Mark Schwahn | Mark Schwahn | June 13, 2007 | 3T5771 | 2.33 |
After confessing to killing Keith, Dan is imprisoned. Haley gives birth to her son, James Lucas Scott. While flatlining, Karen meets of Keith who tells her to go back and watch over their daughter and to look for him in the lilies. She then recovers and meets her daughter, naming her Lily. She visits Dan and spits at the glass door, telling him that she will never forgive him for Keith’s death. Rachel returns to host a post-graduation party where the gang celebrate and reminisce. Nathan and Haley attend but call Deb multiple times to check on the baby. Nathan and Lucas say they will visit Dan but then change their minds. Lucas accepts an assistant coaching job with Whitey. Dan attempts to hang himself but the tie breaks. When the clock strikes midnight, the gang are officially no longer in high school and head to the river court together. There, they promise to all return to Tree Hill in four years and promise each other they will be friends forever, no matter what. Nathan then asks Lucas if he wants a rematch (of their first game in the pilot) and the season ends with the friends laughing and cheering on the brothers. This episode is named after the fifth studio album from Explosions in the Sky. This marked the final appearance of Danneel Harris as a regular as her role was downgraded to recurring then to Guest star in later seasons.

== Reception ==
| Season | Timeslot | Season premiere | Season finale | TV season | Rank | Viewers (in millions) | Rating |
|---|---|---|---|---|---|---|---|
| 4 | Wednesday 9/8C | September 27, 2006 | June 13, 2007 | 2006–2007 | #133 | 2.99 | 1.3 |

== DVD release ==
The DVD release of season four was released after the season has completed broadcast on television. It has been released in Region 1. As well as every episode from the season, the DVD release features bonus material such as, audio commentaries on some episodes from the creator and cast, deleted scenes, gag reels and behind-the-scenes featurettes.

The Complete Fourth Season
| Set details | | | Special features |
|---|---|---|---|
| 21 episodes; 880 minutes (Region 1); 840 minutes (Region 2) 845 minutes (Region 4); 6-disc set; 1.78:1 aspect ratio; Languages: English (Dolby Digital 5.1); Subtitles: English, Spanish French (Region 1) | | | Audio commentaries; "Some You Give Away" - with creator/executive producer/writer Mark Schwahn, and actor Rick Fox; "It Gets the Worst at Night" - with creator/executive producer/co-writer Mark Schwahn and executive producers Joe Davola and Greg Prange.; "All of a Sudden I Miss Everyone" - with creator/executive producer/writer/director Mark Schwahn and actors James Lafferty, Lee Norris and Stephen Colletti.; Deleted scenes; Episodes: 3, 4, 5, 7, 9, 11, 12, 14, 15, 16, 17 & 18; Gag reel; "One Tree Hill In Your Town"; "Tree Hill's Charity Basketball Game Highlights"; "Tree Hill High Time Capsule" |
Release dates
| United States | United Kingdom | Australia | |
| December 18, 2007 | April 7, 2008 | June 4, 2008 | |
