= From the Edge of the Deep Green Sea =

From the Edge of the Deep Green Sea may refer to:

- "From the Edge of the Deep Green Sea", a song by the Cure from Wish
- "From the Edge of the Deep Green Sea (One Tree Hill)", an episode of the American TV series One Tree Hill
