= I've Got Dreams to Remember =

I've Got Dreams to Remember may refer to:

- I've Got Dreams to Remember (One Tree Hill), a 2006 episode of One Tree Hill
- "I've Got Dreams to Remember", a 1968 song by Otis Redding
