= Joe Davola =

Joe Davola is the name of:

- Joe Davola (TV producer), producer of various television series
- "Crazy" Joe Davola, character on Seinfeld, named after the above producer
