= Everything in Its Right Place (disambiguation) =

"Everything in Its Right Place" is a 2000 song by Radiohead.

Everything in Its Right Place may also refer to:

- "Everything in Its Right Place" (Fringe), the seventeenth episode of the fourth season of Fringe
- "Everything In Its Right Place", the eleventh episode of the fourth season of One Tree Hill
