= With Tired Eyes, Tired Minds, Tired Souls, We Slept =

- One Tree Hill episode
- Jimmy Edwards fires a pistol
- Episode no.: Season 3 Episode 16
- Directed by: Greg Prange
- Written by: Mark Schwahn
- Cinematography by: Billy Dickson; Peter B. Kowalski
- Editing by: Les Butler
- Production code: 2T6166
- Original air date: March 1, 2006

Guest appearances
- Danneel Harris as Rachel Gatina; Antwon Tanner as Antwon "Skills" Taylor; Allison Scagliotti as Abby Brown; Marcus Coloma as Marcus; Colin Fickes as Jimmy Edwards; Renee Vincent as Mary Edwards; Amber Wallace as Glenda Farrell

Episode chronology
← Previous "Just Watch the Fireworks"	Next → "Who Will Survive, and What Will Be Left of Them"
- One Tree Hill season 3

"With Tired Eyes, Tired Minds, Tired Souls, We Slept " is the 16th episode of One Tree Hill's third season and the show's 61st episode overall. It first aired on the WB in the United States on March 1, 2006. It was written by Mark Schwahn and directed by Greg Prange and revolves around a school shooting.

The episode was well-received by critics and fans, and was characterized as a landmark episode for the series. Set at Tree Hill High School, it centers on bullied student Jimmy Edwards, who brings a gun to school seeking revenge on his tormentors. His former friend, Lucas Scott, and Lucas's brother, Nathan Scott, put themselves at risk to protect their most beloved ones.

== Plot ==
Jimmy Edwards, a bullied and tormented teenager, who was once close friends with Lucas Scott (Chad Michael Murray), Skills Taylor (Antwon Tanner) and Mouth McFadden (Lee Norris), enters the school while smoking a cigarette. He walks down the hallway and sees the bullies who beat him up the night before going through his locker; when they notice him, they move to leave, laughing while one of them bumps him purposefully and insults him. Jimmy pulls out a gun just as Peyton Sawyer (Hilarie Burton) and Brooke Davis (Sophia Bush) come around the corner at the glass library doors. Jimmy fires one shot as Peyton and Brooke hit the floor for cover, and the school is sent into a frenzied panic.

Brooke searches for Peyton outside as the team bus pulls up with Coach Whitey Durham (Barry Corbin), Lucas and Nathan (James Lafferty) getting off. Brooke informs them of the situation and Nathan and Lucas rush into the school, Nathan looking for Haley (Bethany Joy Galeotti) and Lucas immediately deciding to look for Peyton. Meanwhile, Haley is sheltering a group of students in the tutor center, including Jimmy.

Nathan and Lucas go their separate ways and Lucas finds Peyton, bleeding from a wound in her leg, in the library: the wound is assumed to be a piece of glass. Nathan comes across Mouth, who had been in the A/V room at the time of the shooting. They make their way to the tutor center. They get there, and, after convincing the group it is them, and not the shooter, they get in. As they try to help everyone escape, Jimmy pulls out the gun and forces them to stay in the tutor center, revealing himself as the shooter. In the midst of the chaos, Brooke is stuck in the school gym due to her parents' absence. She angrily confronts a ruthless reporter who is using the shooting for personal gain.

Lucas tends to Peyton and finds that it is actually a bullet in her leg, and promises her that she will be okay. Peyton is losing a lot of blood and Lucas does his best to keep her talking so that she has a better chance of survival if awake instead of asleep. Peyton states how Lucas is always saving her, at which he responds that somebody’s got to. Feeling that she does not have long to live and wanting to confess her feelings for him, she tells a melted Lucas she loves him and then brings him closer to her for a kiss, which he returns. Meanwhile, Rachel (Danneel Harris), Mouth, Haley, and Skills attempt to reason with Jimmy who is fed up with being ignored and made fun of.

Brooke realizes that she has been looking for the wrong things in life when a worried mother comes to her looking for her daughter, thinking that her daughter and Brooke are friends. Though Brooke assures the mother that she will find her daughter, she realizes that she does not know her and excuses herself outside to secretly break down into sobs. She later finds the girl and convinces her to find her mother.

In the tutor center, the situation is quickly deteriorating. Jimmy lets Abby (Allison Scagliotti) go due to an illness she has and turns back to find Nathan sending a text with his phone; he threatens to kill whoever comes into the school, just as Lucas risks it all and carries an unconscious Peyton out of the library to bring her to safety. The library door slams and Jimmy goes to confront them, despite the pleas of Haley, Nathan, Rachel, Mouth and Skills.

The confrontation is halted when Keith (Craig Sheffer) convinces Dan (Paul Johansson) to sneak him into the school to talk to Jimmy. Keith convinces Jimmy to let Lucas and Peyton go. After a dramatic confrontation, in which Keith reaches out to Jimmy in an attempt to save him, Jimmy uses his own gun to commit suicide. The group in the tutor center hear the shot and Haley and Mouth break down into tears. Meanwhile, Lucas has carried Peyton outside and she is loaded into the ambulance. He meets with Brooke who had been let out of the gym, and his mother, Karen (Moira Kelly).

A few moments after Jimmy's suicide, Dan shows up in the hall, picks up Jimmy's gun and shoots Keith in the chest, killing him instantly and therefore framing Jimmy as the murderer.

== Background ==
Peyton, hit by a ricochet bullet, bleeds out in the library. The setting allowed for the introduction of the theme "Saving Peyton."

In the DVD commentary and the making-of featurette, the creators addressed their initial "should we?" or "shouldn't we?" reactions to making the episode. Because of the sensitive nature of the topic, they did not want to glorify or make light of school shootings. They wanted to make a statement about how these kinds of incidents affect more than just those directly involved. The music was carefully designed, and a theme called "Saving Peyton", composed by John Nordstrom, was introduced for parts of the script where character Lucas Scott strives to save a dying Peyton Sawyer.

Mark Schwahn, the series' creator and writer of the episode, "took this old character in Jimmy Edwards [Colin Fickes], who hadn’t been around in seasons, and used his re-emergence" to tell the story about life in high-school as an outsider. Being a controversial topic, Schwahn had to convince executives to allow the episode. The actors "who were locked in the tutor center would file into this little room day after day and film these emotionally draining scenes".

Looking back on the episode, Hilarie Burton said, "when we were doing the episode for One Tree Hill about the school shooting, none of the actors were into it, none of us wanted to do it. We got the script, we were very upset about it. Um, we were like 'This hasn't happened in so long. Why would we bring this up? We don't want to encourage or give attention to that kind of behavior.' Then literally while we're having this conversation with our creator and our bosses, two incidents happened. It was heartbreaking to know that stuff was still going on, it just wasn't receiving media attention that it used to."

Allison Scagliotti, who portrays Abby Brown in the episode, one of the hostages Jimmy sets free, said, "I’m so glad the episode garnered the response that it did. I had no doubt, given the subject matter, that it might resonate with a lot of people, so I think I speak for all involved when I say we tried to handle it respectfully." She said the audition process was "kind of a top-secret affair" because she read sides for a character named Michelle in a scene with another character who was not Jimmy Edwards. "After I was cast, the script that production released didn’t have the last page attached! They kept the end of the episode under wraps until the very last second. I was extremely moved by what I read, mostly because the Jimmy character was someone that could be very real."

Also resonating with fans is the episode's closing quote. At the end of the episode, Lucas narrates:

Does this darkness have a name? This cruelty, this hatred. How did it find us? Did it steal into our lives or did we seek it out and embrace it? What happened to us, that we now send our children into the world like we send young men to war? Hoping for their safe return, but knowing that some will be lost along the way. When did we lose our way? Consumed by the shadows, swallowed whole by the darkness. Does this darkness have a name? Is it your name?

== Reception ==
Jimmy commits suicide in the episode's climax, where Keith is also murdered, visuals which impacted fans.

The episode received generally positive reviews from critics, and was one of the season's highest-rated. Jenny Hollander of Bustle called it "acclaimed." TV Guide stated that it "proved [One Tree Hill] to be smarter — and gutsier — than your average teen drama." Daniel Fienberg of Zap2it said that the episode was a "surprisingly earnest and reflective depiction of a school shooting [with Colin Fickes as a troubled teen with a gun] that avoided the 'Very Special Episode' syndrome by also advancing the season's plot".

Some reviewers referred to it as "the Columbine episode," in reference to the Columbine High School massacre, and said it added new depth to the series. Cynthia Boris of DVD Verdict said that "through all the fluff, implausible storylines, and pretty smiles from pretty people," the episode "sets itself apart from the rest" and "the pretty and popular heroes of the show take a backseat to a chubby, bullied young man who has been humiliated for the last time." She stated, "When you see the realness of Jimmy (Colin Fickes) balanced against this cast of plastic, perfect people, it's pretty easy to see why kids kill kids."

Although Boris felt the episode would "b[low] right past the core audience" and that viewers would likely find Chad Michael Murray dressing up as Jack Sparrow as the more memorable moment from the season, it ranked highest in a 2009 pick of the "12 most essential episodes" of One Tree Hill by fans at website starnewsonline.com. "That episode, featuring the shooting of Uncle Keith, is a clear favorite among fans and really was a turning point for the series," stated Jeff Hidek of the website. "This episode proved that the show could reach beyond hookups and hook shots and tap into its audience's hearts." The episode is considered one of the series' most pivotal, and the storyline is frequently named among fans as one of the best. Maggie Fremont of Vulture.com categorized it as "the pinnacle of season three" and credited it with addressing the topic of school shootings before television was "inundated with shows tackling the same subject matter in exploitative ways." Both she and Hollander appreciated the lasting effect the episode had on the series. TheCinemaSource.com called the episode the highlight of Season 3, stating, "This episode is a must-see and should have been the season finale because of its dreadful ending. This was a powerful episode that writers took a risk with because it was a topical issue to tackle that tried to send a message to those who seek hope."

Conversely, Amy Kane of Film.com said the episode made her quit watching the show temporarily, because One Tree Hill is a show that is "so campy and tongue-in-cheek that it seemed like bad taste for it to address such a serious subject". Alan Prendergast of Westword also referred to the show as campy and opined that it "decided to get serious" by creating "With Tired Eyes, Tired Minds, Tired Souls, We Slept." He listed it as one of "the five most convoluted school shooting episodes."
