= Like You Like an Arsonist =

- One Tree Hill episode
- Episode no.: Season 3 Episode 1
- Directed by: Greg Prange
- Written by: Mark Schwahn
- Production code: 2J5001
- Original air date: October 5, 2005

Guest appearances
- Chris William Martin (Zach Salvatore); Benjamin Ayres (William Tanner)

Episode chronology
← Previous "The Leavers Dance"	Next → "From the Edge of the Deep Green Sea"
- One Tree Hill season 3

"Like You Like an Arsonist" is the first episode of the third season of the WB television series One Tree Hill and the series' forty-sixth episode overall. It originally aired on Thursday, October 5, 2005. The episode was written by Mark Schwann and directed by Greg Prange. The title references the song by Paris, Texas.

== Plot ==
Dan (Paul Johansson) is found alive outside the dealership. Nathan (James Lafferty), still mad at Haley (Bethany Joy Galeotti), tells her he's leaving for camp, while she would make amends with him and continue their relationship. In the meantime, Lucas and Peyton come back home from the beach and tell each other it’s always gonna be them, no matter what.

Three months later, the end of summer is approaching. Karen (Moira Kelly) and Brooke (Sophia Bush) return to town as Dan recovers. Dan tells Deb (Barbara Alyn Woods) he doesn't remember anything after passing out. Lucas (Chad Michael Murray) and Peyton (Hilarie Burton) have spent the whole summer together, growing closer again and forming a great friendship by hanging out, sharing mutual secrets and intimate things, resulting in their bond becoming stronger than it has ever been.

Haley still loves Nathan, but he's at camp not answering her calls, so she writes him. Peyton feels like her mother lied to her by not telling her she was adopted, but her father, Larry, promises her they planned to but couldn't as she died. He tells her she has one real mother who loved her and to never attack her.

Brooke tells Lucas she’s thought they could have a sort of non-exclusive fling, being able to see other people: he hesitantly accepts, pretending to be satisfied although he would try again to be together with her for real. Haley gets her old job back at Karen's Cafe. Deb tells Dan she wants a divorce now that he's better. Peyton questions who sent her the threatening emails. Brooke moves into Nathan's old apartment with Haley.

Dan goes to a confessional where he asks the priest if sins not committed can be forgiven. He reveals that he remembers seeing someone in the dealership as he blacked out, but pretended to forget. He says that when he finds out who did it, he will commit mortal sins. As he says this, motives and images of Jules, Lucas, Nathan, Haley, Deb, Karen, Whitey, Keith, and Andy flash across the screen. Lucas tells Peyton Ellie is back in town. Nathan is shown at camp, still wearing his wedding ring as a necklace. Lucas is shown in his room, holding the now burnt card Dan was given that read "for everything you've done".

== Feature music ==
In "Like You Like an Arsonist" we can hear the songs:

- "Feeling a Moment" by Feeder
- "The Side of Heaven" by Matthew Ryan
- "The Rhythm of Your Breathing" by Trembling Blue Stars
- "Nobody's Darlings" by Lucero
- "Light Years Away" by MoZella
- "Simple as it Should Be" by Tristan Prettyman
- "Stars and Boulevards" by Augustana
- "She's Adorable" by Leif Karate
- "Elsewhere" by Bethan Joy Lenz
- "All Eternal Things" by Trembling Blue Stars

== Reception ==
=== Ratings ===
In its original American broadcast, "Like You Like an Arsonist" was watched by 3.46 million.
