= I've Got Dreams to Remember (One Tree Hill) =

- One Tree Hill episode
- Episode no.: Season 3 Episode 12
- Directed by: Stuart Gillard
- Written by: Mike Herro & David Strauss
- Production code: 2T6162
- Original air date: January 25, 2006

Episode chronology
← Previous "Return of the Future"	Next → "The Wind That Blew My Heart Away"
- One Tree Hill season 3

"I've Got Dreams to Remember" is the twelfth episode of the third season of the WB television series One Tree Hill and the series' fifty-seventh episode overall. It originally aired on Thursday, January 25, 2006. The episode was written by Mike Herro & David Strauss and directed by Stuart Gillard. The title references the song by Otis Redding.

== Plot ==
Haley (Bethany Joy Galeotti) has been worried about Lucas' health after he stopped taking his meds. The students meet with the school counselor to plan for the future. Over their discussions with the guidance counselor, the group learns different things about what they want after high school and reveal their feelings about graduation. Nathan (James Lafferty) and Haley realize they want to attend colleges across the country from one another. Lucas (Chad Michael Murray) and Brooke (Sophia Bush) show little interest in going to college, but both want to go somewhere where they can excel in their talents, basketball and cheerleading.

Keith is questioned by the police, but cannot be held as they have no evidence, and he was only arrested as a favor to Dan (Paul Johansson). Karen (Moira Kelly) waits for Keith as he gets out of jail and Keith asks her out on their first official date, to go to the Ravens game. Keith later tells Lucas about the date, and he is delighted to hear about it.

Brooke finds Mouth teaching the girls a new cheer earlier than their normal meeting time. Rachel tells her it was a surprise for her, but Brooke realizes quickly that the cheerleading competition is the same weekend as Rogue Vogue, which is why Rachel sent her designs in. Mouth goes to Brooke and apologizes for helping with the cheer, but Brooke warns him to stay away from Rachel because someone like Rachel could never like someone like Mouth, genuinely. This hurts Mouth's feelings who storms off. Lucas later helps Brooke realize she can do both competitions as long as she flies.

At school the next day, Dan is giving a guest lecture, which Nathan refuses to attend. He later tells the counselor that going to college is the only way to escape his father. Peyton (Hilarie Burton) talks with Ellie about college, and while Peyton doesn't want to go, Ellie says she could see Peyton studying art, music, or maybe business. Peyton asks Ellie to think of a CD title and as Ellie asks why she is a cheerleader, Peyton says its because her mom was one.

At the game, Dan tells Nathan a scout wants to watch him. Whitey forced Nathan to sit out the game after he skipped the lecture earlier that day. During halftime, the Ravens are losing. Brooke apologizes to Mouth, who still plans on going out with Rachel after the game. During the last few seconds of the game, Nathan talks to Lucas and reminds him to put the ball in the dead spot. Lucas takes his advice and the Ravens win the game. As he wins the game and everyone celebrates with him, Lucas recalls telling the counselor that the reason he joined the basketball team was all because of his Uncle Keith as he wanted him to fit in and Keith is like a father to him.

After the game, Lucas plans to go out for a meal with Keith and Karen. Nathan is also confused about what to do after college because he feels like if he stays with Haley, he is keeping her from her dreams, but if he lets her go, it means he doesn't love her anymore. She replies by saying all that matters is they love each other. With some help from Keith, the scout compliments Lucas and shows interest in him, but Lucas tells the scout he should also meet Nathan and he calls him over. Nathan thanks Whitey for not letting him play and Whitey tells him by putting the team first, he was a captain and a leader. Nathan asks Whitey to get a Stanford scout out.

Flashbacks to the counseling session highlight some of their feelings. Brooke reveals she doesn't like to talk about college because everyone is going to leave, and she will be alone again and have to start over, with no one. Lucas wants to play basketball and be with his friends. Nathan says it is hard for him to decide as basketball was his everything, until Haley. Peyton tells the counselor she now wants to go to college and maybe study art, music, or business, as Ellie suggested.

Peyton gets home and Ellie reveals she was at the game and she begins to cry, but promises nothing is wrong. She then shows Peyton an idea for the CD, called 'Friends With Benefit' and gives her the album art with Peyton as the angel of death on the front cover. It starts to rain in Tree Hill. As Keith, Karen, and Lucas enjoy a family meal, Dan watches outside. Keith appears and tells him to go home as they are not his life.

== Feature music ==
In "I've Got Dreams to Remember" we can hear the songs:

- "(So I'll Sit Here) Waiting" by the Like
- "Bounce" by Molly M.
- "Adele" by White Mud Freeway
- "Tell Me Story" by Sarta
- "Steve McQueen Was a Great Papillion" by Leif Karate
- "Faith Hope Love" by Starsailor
- "Life After Love" by Colored Shadows

== Reception ==
=== Ratings ===
In its original American broadcast, "Like You Like an Arsonist" was watched by 2.70 million viewers.
