= From the Edge of the Deep Green Sea (One Tree Hill) =

- One Tree Hill episode
- Episode no.: Season 3 Episode 2
- Directed by: Kevin Dowling
- Written by: Mark Schwahn
- Production code: 2T6152
- Original air date: October 12, 2005

Episode chronology
← Previous "Like You Like an Arsonist"	Next → "First Day on a Brand New Planet"
- One Tree Hill season 3

"From the Edge of the Deep Green Sea" is the second episode of the third season of the WB television series One Tree Hill and the series' forty-seventh episode overall. It originally aired on Thursday, October 12, 2005. The episode was written by Mark Schwann and directed by Kevin Dowling. The title references the song by the Cure.

== Plot ==
Brooke (Sophia Bush) throws a beach party to celebrate the last summer before senior year. She still only wants to be non exclusive with Lucas (Chad Michael Murray), who pretends to go along with it. Nathan (James Lafferty) returns to town and still wants nothing to do with Lucas and won't talk to Haley (Bethany Joy Galeotti), who wants to be with him and is sad he won't talk to her. The fire at Scott Motors is ruled an accident.

Peyton (Hilarie Burton) learns from Ellie that she tried to visit her when she was ten and her father hid it from her. Peyton angrily confronts him about this, but he swears it was for her own good. Ellie tells her father that her situation has changed.

Dan (Paul Johansson) has been having blips of memories return from the night of the fire and confronts Karen (Moira Kelly) about who could have tried to kill him, proposing Keith or Andy. Karen tells him to leave her alone and remarks that it's a shame that if someone wanted him dead, they failed.

Lucas spots Ellie in town seemingly making a drug deal. Haley talks to Nathan who didn't tell her he was back and refuses to speak to her, and she tells him he's changed. At the party, Peyton feels depressed as she feels bad for ignoring Ellie and Lucas ends up telling her he saw her making a drug deal, while Haley is sad as she hoped Nathan would show up and he doesn't. Lucas confronts Nathan and says he can hate him, but if he hurts Haley he will hurt him. This causes Nathan to showp up and tell Haley that he doesn't want to hurt her, but he's just not ready to figure out what they are now to each other yet. Lucas tells Brooke, who is messing around, he's the guy for her and one day she will realize it.

Peyton confronts Ellie about the drugs. Dan comes to the beach, and seeing Lucas by the bonfire triggers a memory from the night of the fire, in which he remembers Lucas in the dealership.

== Feature music ==
In "From the Edge of the Deep Green Sea" we can hear the songs:

- "Ride" by Faraci
- "Waiting for Sunday" by Michelle FEatherstone
- "In N' Out" by Kingstreet
- "You Light Me Up" by Debby Boone
- "Bela Lugosi's Dead" by Bauhaus
- "We Are All on Drugs" by Weezer
- "Sugar, We're Going Down" by Fall Out Boy
- "When the Stars Go Blue" by Bethany Joy Lenz
- "Move Along" by The All-American Rejects
- "Movin' On" by Mya

== Reception ==
=== Ratings ===
In its original American broadcast, "Like You Like an Arsonist" was watched by 3.12 million viewers.
