= Colin Fickes =

American actor

- Born: Raleigh, North Carolina, U.S.
- Occupation: Actor
- Years active: 1994–present

Colin Fickes (/ˈfɪkɪs/ FIK-iss) is an American actor known for his recurring roles in One Tree Hill and Dawson's Creek.

== Early life ==
Fickes was born and raised in Raleigh, North Carolina. He attended Broughton High School, where he was a classmate of Nick Karner and actress Aubrey Dollar.

== Career ==
He is best known as high school teenager Jimmy Edwards on the hit series One Tree Hill. In one of the series' most notable episodes, the character died by suicide after bringing a gun to his school Tree Hill High, resulting in a hostage situation.

Fickes also appeared in the 2007 film Transformers. Additionally, he has appeared in several other feature films and made guest television appearances, including a recurring role on Dawson's Creek. In 2007, he appeared in The Go-Getter alongside Lou Taylor Pucci, Zooey Deschanel and Jena Malone.

== Filmography ==
=== Film ===
Year	Title	Role	Notes
1994	The Hudsucker Proxy	Newsboy	
1999	The Rage: Carrie 2	Tuba Player	
2000	Cherry Falls	Dino	
2002	Roger Dodger	Angus	
2004	Chrystal	Hog	
2007	The Go-Getter	Buddy	
2007	Transformers	Analyst	
2007	Sunny & Share Love You	Jason Trumble	
2008	Over Her Dead Body	Don	
2008	Broken Angel	Hank	
2008	The New Twenty	Ben Barr	
2010	10 Years Later	Drew	

=== Television ===
Year	Title	Role	Notes
1998	Dawson's Creek	Kenny	2 episodes
1999	Shake, Rattle and Roll: An American Love Story	Butch	Television film
2001	Law & Order	Paul	Episode: "School Daze"
2001	Law & Order: Special Victims Unit	Glenn Rudd	Episode: "Care"
2002	Boston Public	Tony	Episode: "Chapter Forty-Two"
2003–2006	One Tree Hill	Jimmy Edwards	4 episodes
2005	Without a Trace	Sean	Episode: "Lost Time"
2006	Invasion	Deputy Palmateer	Episode: "Power"
2019	A Christmas Wish	Grant	Television film
