= Joe Davola (TV producer) =

American television director, writer and producer

Joe Davola is an American television and film producer, director and writer. He was born in Brooklyn, New York City and raised in Rosedale, New York.

Davola, Mike Tollin and Brian Robbins formed production company Tollin/Robbins Productions, which developed and produced a number of successful television series. Some projects include All That, The Amanda Show, The Nick Cannon Show, One Tree Hill, What I Like About You, The Bronx Is Burning, and Smallville.

Davola started his career at MTV as an associate producer and later became one of the channel's top executive producers. He co-created the cult game show Remote Control.

Davola went on to Fox Broadcasting Company as Senior Vice President of Development, where he developed the Emmy Award-winning shows In Living Color and The Ben Stiller Show as well as the Billboard Music Awards. Davola returned to MTV in 1993, where as senior vice president of development and production, he started MTV Films, MTV Home Video and MTV Productions. From MTV he went to DreamWorks Television where he was involved in the development of the hit ABC show Spin City. The character "Crazy" Joe Davola on the sitcom Seinfeld was named after him.

Davola and Robbins co-created AwesomenessTV which sold to DreamWorks Animation in May 2013 and to Viacom in 2018. It is as of 2022 under ViacomCBS.
