= Janice Cooke =

American television director and producer

- Born: March 16, 1956
- Died: December 7, 2024 (aged 68)
- Other names: Janice A. Cook; Janice A. Cooke; J. Cooke-Leonard; Janice Cooke-Leonard; Janice Cooke Leonard
- Occupation(s): Television director, television producer
- Years active: 1980–2024

Janice Cooke was an American television director and producer.

She began her professional career as an associate producer on the series Fantasy Island in 1980. Followed by a number of other television producing credits in Blue Thunder, Our Family Honor, Werewolf, Hard Time on Planet Earth, Moon Over Miami, The Marshal and Any Day Now. She made her episodic directorial debut with Any Day Now.

Cooke-Leonard's directorial credits include Dawson's Creek, The Division, Summerland, Charmed, Close to Home, Privileged, The Ex List, The Cleaner, 90210, One Tree Hill, Cold Case, Gossip Girl, Bluff City Law, Station 19, How to Get Away with Murder, 4400, Swagger, Raising Dion, BMF, Wu-Tang: An American Saga, Joe Pickett and The Irrational. She has also participated in the production of the web series Hollywood Is Like High School with Money.
