= One Tree Hill (TV series) =

2003 American television teen drama series

- Genre: Teen drama; Coming-of-age; Romance
- Created by: Mark Schwahn
- Showrunners: Mark B. Perry; Mark Schwahn
- Starring: Chad Michael Murray; James Lafferty; Hilarie Burton; Bethany Joy Lenz; Sophia Bush; Paul Johansson; Barry Corbin; Craig Sheffer; Moira Kelly; Barbara Alyn Woods; Lee Norris; Antwon Tanner; Danneel Harris; Jackson Brundage; Lisa Goldstein; Austin Nichols; Robert Buckley; Shantel VanSanten; Jana Kramer; Stephen Colletti; Tyler Hilton
- Narrated by: Chad Michael Murray; Paul Johansson; Bethany Joy Lenz; Sophia Bush; James Lafferty
- Opening theme: "I Don't Want to Be" by Gavin DeGraw
- Composers: John E. Nordstrom; Mark Morgan; Mark Snow; Grace Potter; Matthew Caws
- Country of origin: United States
- Original language: English
- No. of seasons: 9
- No. of episodes: 187 (list of episodes)

Production
- Executive producers: Mark Schwahn; Michael Tollin; Brian Robbins; Joe Davola; Greg Prange; Mark B. Perry
- Producers: Maureen Milligan; David Blake Hartley; Kelly R. Tenney; Les Bulter; David Strauss; Mike Herro; Karin Gist; Adele Lim; R. Lee Fleming Jr.; Lynn Raynor; John A. Norris; Roger Grant
- Production location: Wilmington, North Carolina
- Cinematography: Michael Grady ("Pilot"); Billy Dickson; Peter B. Kowalski; Stephen Thompson
- Camera setup: Single-camera setup
- Running time: 42 minutes
- Production companies: Tollin/Robbins Productions; Warner Bros. Television; Mastermind Laboratories (2008–2012; seasons 5–9)

Original release
- Network: The WB
- Release: September 23, 2003 – May 3, 2006
- Network: The CW
- Release: September 27, 2006 – April 4, 2012

One Tree Hill is an American teen drama television series created by Mark Schwahn, which premiered on September 23, 2003, on the WB. After the series' third season, the WB merged with UPN to form the CW, and from September 27, 2006, the series was broadcast by the CW in the United States until the end of its run on April 4, 2012. The show is set in the fictional town of Tree Hill, North Carolina, and initially follows the lives of two half-brothers, played by Chad Michael Murray and James Lafferty, who compete for positions on their school's basketball team and the drama that ensues from the brothers' respective romantic relationships.

Most of the filming took place in and around Wilmington, North Carolina. Many of the scenes were shot near the battleship USS North Carolina and on the University of North Carolina Wilmington campus. The first four seasons of the show focus on the main characters' lives through their high school years. Within these seasons, we see the characters build unexpected relationships as they face the challenges of growing up in a small town. However, at the beginning of the fifth season, Schwahn advanced the timeline by four years to show their lives after college. This season featured a new storyline supported by flashbacks to their college years. Later, Schwahn made it jump a further fourteen months from the end of the sixth to the start of the seventh season. The opening credits were originally accompanied by the song "I Don't Want to Be" by Gavin DeGraw. The theme was removed from the opening in the fifth season; Schwahn said that this was to lower production costs, to add more time for the storyline, and because he felt that the song was more representative of the core characters' adolescent past than their present maturity. The opening then consisted only of the title against a black background. The theme was restored for season 8, in response to audience demand, and was sung by a different artist each episode.

The series premiered to 2.5 million viewers and rose to 3.3 million in its second week, becoming one of only three shows to rise in their second episode during the 2003–2004 television season. The series received numerous award nominations, winning two Teen Choice Awards.

On May 12, 2009, it was confirmed that Murray and Hilarie Burton had declined to return for the seventh season, although accounts of what transpired vary. Their characters, Lucas and Peyton, had been two of the five lead characters and had provided one of the series' central love stories throughout the show. On May 17, 2011, the CW renewed One Tree Hill for a ninth and final season, placing an order for 13 episodes. Bethany Joy Lenz and Sophia Bush were signed as full-time regulars for one final season, and Lafferty appeared as a part-time regular. Murray returned for a special appearance during the final season, which premiered on January 11, 2012. The show is the fourth-longest-running series on the CW network, or the networks that came together to make it up (the WB and UPN), after Supernatural, 7th Heaven and Smallville.

In August 2024, a reboot of the series by Hilarie Burton, Sophia Bush and Danneel Ackles was announced as in development at Netflix.

== Series overview ==
Set in the fictional North Carolina coastal town of Tree Hill, the main storyline in the early seasons is the relationship between two half-brothers, Lucas and Nathan Scott, who start out as enemies but bonded as the show progresses. The show starts out with Lucas becoming a member of the Tree Hill Ravens (the high school basketball team) with the help of his uncle Keith. Nathan, the team captain, is threatened by this and it becomes the basis of their rivalry, also fueled by Lucas's romantic interest in Nathan's girlfriend, Peyton Sawyer. Later on, Brooke Davis, Peyton's best friend, tries to date Lucas, while Nathan attempts to date Lucas's best friend Haley James. The character of Lucas and Nathan's father, Dan Scott, is occasionally explored throughout. There is a focus on his relationships with Karen Roe, Lucas's mother, and Deb Scott, Nathan's mother, and his decision to stay with Deb rather than Karen, thus abandoning Lucas. These experiences eventually bond the brothers as the series progresses and life unfolds for both of them.

== Episodes ==
Season	Episodes	Originally released			Rank	Average viewership (in millions)
Season	Episodes	First released	Last released	Network	Rank	Average viewership (in millions)
1	22	September 23, 2003	May 11, 2004	The WB	136	3.84
2	23	September 21, 2004	May 24, 2005	The WB	129	4.34
3	22	October 5, 2005	May 3, 2006	The WB	137	3.06
4	21	September 27, 2006	June 13, 2007	The CW	133	2.94
5	18	January 8, 2008	May 19, 2008	The CW	122	2.92
6	24	September 1, 2008	May 18, 2009	The CW	110	2.84
7	22	September 14, 2009	May 17, 2010	The CW	115	2.28
8	22	September 14, 2010	May 17, 2011	The CW	129	1.78
9	13	January 11, 2012	April 4, 2012	The CW	159	1.48

== Cast and characters ==
Main cast (opening credits)
Recurring guest star (3+ episodes)
Guest star (1–2 episodes)

Original main five characters: Lucas and Peyton (center), Nathan and Haley (left) and Brooke (right)

Actor	Character	Seasons								
Actor	Character	1	2	3	4	5	6	7	8	9
Chad Michael Murray	Lucas Scott	Main	Main	Main	Main	Main	Main			Guest
James Lafferty	Nathan Scott	Main (Note: Lafferty is only credited in episodes in which he appears in season 9.)	Main	Main	Main	Main	Main	Main	Main	Main
Hilarie Burton	Peyton Sawyer	Main	Main	Main	Main	Main	Main			
Bethany Joy Lenz	Haley James Scott	Main	Main	Main	Main	Main	Main	Main	Main	Main
Paul Johansson	Dan Scott	Main (Note: Johansson departs in "Weeks Go by Like Days" (season 7, episode 13).)	Main	Main	Main	Main	Main	Main	Guest	Main
Sophia Bush	Brooke Davis	Main	Main	Main	Main	Main	Main	Main	Main	Main
Barry Corbin	Brian "Whitey" Durham	Main	Main	Main	Main	Guest	Guest			
Craig Sheffer	Keith Scott	Main	Main	Main	Guest					Guest
Moira Kelly	Karen Roe	Main	Main	Main	Main	Guest	Guest			
Barbara Alyn Woods	Deb Scott	Main	Main	Main	Main	Recurring	Main (Note: Woods is only credited in episodes in which she appears after "Things a Mamma Don't Know" (season 6, episode 13).)			Guest
Lee Norris	Marvin "Mouth" McFadden	Recurring	Recurring	Main	Main	Main	Main	Main	Main	Main
Antwon Tanner	Antwon "Skills" Taylor	Recurring	Recurring	Recurring	Main (Note: Tanner is changed to recurring status after "Weeks Go by Like Days" (season 7, episode 13).)	Main	Main	Main	Recurring	Recurring
Danneel Harris	Rachel Gatina			Recurring	Main	Guest		Recurring		
Jackson Brundage	Jamie Scott					Main	Main	Main	Main	Main
Lisa Goldstein	Millicent Huxtable					Recurring	Main	Main	Main	Main
Austin Nichols	Julian Baker						Recurring	Main	Main	Main
Robert Buckley	Clay Evans							Main	Main	Main
Shantel VanSanten	Quinn James							Main	Main	Main
Jana Kramer	Alex Dupre							Main (Note: Kramer is added to the opening credits from "Family Affair" (season 7, episode 14).)	Main	Main
Stephen Colletti	Chase Adams				Recurring	Guest	Recurring	Recurring	Main (Note: Colletti is added to the opening credits from "Holding Out for a Hero" (season 8, episode 14).)	Main
Tyler Hilton	Chris Keller		Recurring	Recurring	Guest					Main

== Production ==
=== Conception ===
Schwahn originally planned to make One Tree Hill a feature length film with the title Ravens, the name of the show's high school basketball team. However, he became convinced that it would be more interesting as a television series. He said the idea for the story came from his own personal experiences. As in the setting of the show, Schwahn went to school in a small town and played on a basketball team. He described himself as similar to the character of Mouth McFadden. Schwahn said that in designing the show, he created Lucas as "this underdog kid from the wrong side of the tracks" who crosses over to the pretty and popular; he wanted to show the life of such a person in a basketball context, feeling that basketball was a great platform for telling stories.

The title of the show and the name of the fictional town where the series takes place are derived from the song "One Tree Hill", which is named after the landmark in New Zealand. Most of the show's episodes are titles of songs, bands or albums. Schwahn named the town "Tree Hill" because, while he was writing the idea for the show, he had been listening to the album The Joshua Tree by U2. In the early days, fans often asked Schwahn why the show was named One Tree Hill when the town was just called Tree Hill. The question is ostensibly answered when Karen tells Lucas in episode 1.22, "There is only one Tree Hill ... and it's your home." The same sentence is said by Haley to Jamie on the roof of Karen's Cafe in episode 9.13, the series finale.

=== Music ===
Music plays a significant part in the plot and the movement of the scenes throughout the show. Schwahn revealed that each episode is named after a particular song, band or album that has something in common with the theme of the episode. Popular indie music has been featured on the show, and various artists have guest-starred.

Three soundtrack albums from the show have been released: One Tree Hill – Music from the WB Television Series, Vol. 1, Friends with Benefit: Music from the Television Series One Tree Hill, Volume 2, and The Road Mix: Music from the Television Series One Tree Hill, Volume 3. A portion of the proceeds of the second soundtrack go to the National Breast Cancer Foundation (NBCF), tying in with a storyline on the show involving breast cancer. On November 13, 2008, iTunes published a soundtrack called Music from One Tree Hill, which contained songs from the sixth season.

=== Episode format ===
Episodes follow a regular structure. An episode normally begins with a recap of events relevant to the upcoming narrative, although this is sometimes dropped to satisfy time constraints. During the first four seasons, the theme tune is played either immediately after the recap or after the first few scenes. Whenever an episode features sensitive or violent subjects, or when an episode's running length is close to the total allotted time, there is no opening montage, but only One Tree Hill written on a black background. From the beginning of season 5, the theme song, "I Don't Want to Be" by Gavin DeGraw, was abandoned, and only the single white-on-black title was used. The theme was restored for season 8, sung by different artists each week. Schwahn's reasons for removing the theme were various:

It's interesting about the theme song. Not only is it costly – and that never sort of drives what we do creatively, but I think fans don't understand that there's money on the table every time they hear the theme song. That sounds like a bullshit producer response, too, but that's a part of it because every year our budget is pretty challenged. Knowing that, when I looked at the jump ahead, the four year jump, I felt like "I Don't Wanna Be" was very much an anthem for their adolescent lives. It was very much about who am I going to be and who am I and who am I going to be someday. Not to mention that it was 42 seconds of screen time that I knew I could use for story. So a lot went into the decision to drop the theme song, it wasn't done lightly.

One Tree Hill is known for its numerous voice-overs featuring either literary quotes or characters reflecting on events of the episode. Most of them have been made by Chad Michael Murray's character Lucas. However, other characters have done so several times. Guest stars Bryan Greenberg, Sheryl Lee, Torrey DeVitto, and Ashley Rickards have also done voice-overs for single episodes. Characters who interact with the main cast, such as Bevin, Chase, Shelly and Glenda, helped to narrate the joint episodes, being portrayed by Bevin Prince, Stephen Colletti, Elisabeth Harnois and Amber Wallace. As the show progresses, songs continue to replace voiceovers occasionally. At the beginning of season 7, Paul Johansson's character, Dan Scott, has taken over the narrator's role.

In 2008, a black and white episode on a film noir theme was planned, to be written by Chad Michael Murray. Schwahn said, "I think that noir-themed is very risky, because I think that can be very dark and very guy-ish in its approach. I'd say this is more Casablanca infused."

=== Series timeline ===
One Tree Hill starts in 2003 and has a complicated timeline, which varies between contrasting with and corresponding to the real world. In the first season, the main teenage characters are aged sixteen. The first and second seasons cover one year, and the third and fourth seasons another, so the main teenage characters are nearly eighteen at the end of the fourth season. The timeline was further complicated in the fifth season when the show was "dramatically retooled and set four years into the future – after the characters [had] already graduated from college". The fifth season began shooting on July 30, 2007, and premiered January 8, 2008. In it, the characters were stated to be aged twenty-two. In 2009, Schwahn altered the timeline again, setting the seventh season fourteen months after the sixth, thus giving a better explanation for the somewhat abrupt departures of series leads Chad Michael Murray and Hilarie Burton.

Explaining the decision to start the series with the teenagers as juniors, Schwahn said, "Lucas and Nathan were important players on the [basketball] team, the most important, and I just couldn't see that happening to freshmen." He also wanted to keep the characters in high school longer, saying, "I know a lot of the shows that we started with, the kids are out of high school now and into college and what have you, and I always thought that there was a loss of energy when that happened. It's hard to have everyone go to the same college and everyone stay together for whatever reason, or you lose some of your principles." Schwahn wanted to reinvigorate the show. "The show in many ways has been refaced and reinvigorated. It's very much a twenty-something show now with some relevant adult characters, and I really like that energy for the show," he said, and elaborated:

The reason that this compels me is, first of all, I can drop into a world that feels new and, yet, familiar. What I mean by that is this: you know the characters and you've been with them for four years, but you don't know what happened for the last four, and you can drop the audience into new situations. The [actors] can play closer to their age, and we've done a lot of what we would do in college in high school, in terms of that accelerated behavior. The other cool thing it does, and this was not by design, I'm not smart enough to design it this way, but the fact that Lucas and his mom and his dad, Dan, the fact that there was history, that we can always reach back and grab a piece of something over the last four years, like what happened with Dan and Karen, what happened before Lucas joined the team, etc. Like we dropped the audience into this world, but there was so much life before that, that you could always go back and grab a piece when you needed it. If Lucas is with a girl that we've never met, or with Peyton, or with Brooke, or living with Haley and Nathan or whatever, how did that happen and what choices framed that?

Schwahn felt that altering the series in this way allowed the storylines to be a little more complex, and said the actors welcomed the change. By the end of the seventh season, Schwahn and the production team assumed that the network had given the show its last season and decided to create a "mini" series finale in case the show was not renewed. For the season eight finale, the episode spanned an entire year, showing the progression of Brooke's pregnancy over the course of the episode. It was announced by the network a day after the finale that the show was to be renewed for a ninth and final season. The show features a further time jump of one year in the season opener and a further flash forward in the series finale, showing Jamie playing a high school basketball game on the Tree Hill Ravens, his jersey hanging on the wall with a plaque that reads "All Time Leading Scorer".

=== Departures of Murray and Burton ===
In 2009, Murray and Burton were confirmed as having declined to return to the series. For months, it was speculated that they would not be returning for the seventh season. In February, the CW announced a series renewal without specifying which cast members had renewed their contracts. A video of Murray, seemingly unaware he was being filmed, saying the show was not bringing him back because they wanted to save money, and encouraging fans to rally behind him, intensified speculation. A video of Burton saying she would stay if she had creative control also surfaced, fueling speculation that the CW did not want to keep Burton on the show without Murray. To some fans, who considered the heart of the show to be the dynamic between Lucas and Peyton, One Tree Hill without the two characters would not work. A TVGuide.com poll found that nearly half of respondents were, however, willing to take a "wait and see" approach to a revamped version of the series. In April, Schwann told a crowd in Paris that all of the actors had signed on for season 7, except for Murray and Burton. "They're in negotiations right now and I know they've been offered great things, and hopefully they'll decide to come back", he said. "If they don't, that's always a possibility ... [the show] has made it through some of the riskier moves we've done." In May, CW entertainment president Dawn Ostroff stated, "We tried to get them to stay; we would have been thrilled if they wanted to." She said that since Murray and Burton were moving on, Tree Hill now had to reinvent itself a bit – as it did in 2007, with the four-year flash-forward. "A show going into its seventh year is very open to reinventing itself," said Ostroff. "And one thing I have to give Mark Schwahn a lot of credit for is that he has kept the show so fresh all these years."

Burton told Entertainment Weekly that there was a possibility that she would return for guest appearances if asked, and clarified what happened behind the scenes regarding her contract, stating, "[W]hen I hear that there's turmoil or negotiations based on money, it kind of hurts my feelings, because it's not what's been going on at all." She said, "I think my fan base in particular knows that money isn't necessarily a big motivator for me, that's why I work in the world of independent film." Burton had known for some time that she was leaving, adding, "For me, it was definitely an emotional decision. And a professional decision as well. I got really, really lucky. One Tree Hill was my very first television audition; it was a fairytale. I feel really lucky to have that level of success right out of the gate." Referring to a video she had sent to her fans, she said:

The purpose of that video was to dispel the rumors that were being circulated. I was on your end of it for a very long time when I worked at MTV, and I understand how the rumor mill works. Everybody wants a sensational story. People even back then were blaming it on money, and [on me] being high maintenance.... Those rumors were really hurtful. Of anybody on the show, I was the one who was very excited about doing all the extracurricular stuff – the mall tours, the radio tours, going to the upfronts... I loved my involvement with this show, and I really just wanted my fan base to know that I wasn't turning my nose up at this wonderful opportunity I've had for the last six years. There's an ugly trend where actors think they've surpassed the show that made them or the film that made them and badmouth it. I will never say a bad word about One Tree Hill. The entire shape of my world changed because of that show, so I'll always be very affectionate toward it.

Criticism of how their characters, Lucas and Peyton, were written out of the series focused mainly on a lack of explanation about where they went, and the exit not having been morbid enough for a star-crossed couple. Although the episode featuring their departure is initially grim, the episode's tone is drastically different by the end. Some expected a tragic ending because of Lucas and Peyton's star-crossed history and the show's penchant for shocking finales. MTV developed tragic scenarios for how to write the couple out of the series but concluded by saying, "Maybe after all they've been through in six seasons, these two deserved their happy ending". Fans were also glad the couple was finally given the happily-ever-after they felt the two deserved. Their exit was picked as one of the "12 most essential episodes of One Tree Hill" in 2009 by fans at starnewsonline.com.

Schwahn said that he knew that many people would tune in to see how the show would explain Lucas and Peyton's absence, and that the explanation was that they were traveling. He was aware that people might not accept the new version of the show, but said that it needed to move on. To fill the void of Murray and Burton's departures, Robert Buckley and Shantel VanSanten were cast as Nathan's agent Clay and Haley's sister Quinn respectively. Austin Nichols, who plays Julian Baker, was also upgraded to series regular status. Plans for Murray and Burton to return to the series in Season 8 were confirmed. Schwahn said that the actors' busy schedules could possibly prevent a return in time for Brooke's wedding, but he hoped they could return later in the season. On December 7, 2010, Kristin Dos Santos stated that Murray and Burton would definitely not be back for Brooke's wedding, but that they were still expected to return. In January 2011, Burton confirmed that she would not be returning. In August 2011, the CW revealed that Murray would return for a guest appearance in the final season. Burton did not return, as she was not asked back that time around.

=== Sponsorships and cross-promotion ===
One Tree Hill regularly incorporated paid sponsors and cross-promotion into the show's set, narrative, and fan interactions. In 2008, Nielsen Media Research reported that One Tree Hill was the only scripted show ranked among the top 10 in terms of number of product placements. Some instances include Sunkist products visible at concerts, in the characters' fridges, and on the school's vending machines. In a fifth-season episode, Mia agrees to take part in both Rock the Vote and a Starburst-funded concert.

One Tree Hill also partnered with sponsors to invite fan participation in the show. During the second season, AT&T sponsored a poll where fans could determine the outcome of a storyline by texting whether or not Nathan should kiss Haley's sister, Taylor. In 2007, One Tree Hill filmed their prom episode in Honey Grove, Texas, as the result of a Sunkist-sponsored competition where fans could submit videos inviting the cast and crew to their town. In 2008, the CW, Warner Bros. and Macy's partnered to offer eight "passionate" fans the chance for a walk-on role on the show and a weekend with the cast, billed as the "Ultimate Fan Weekend in Wilmington".

In an attempt to promote Life Unexpected to One Tree Hill viewers, the CW aired a crossover event involving both programs on October 12, 2010. Beginning with the One Tree Hill episode "Nobody Taught Us to Quit", and continuing in the Life Unexpected episode "Music Faced", Haley James Scott and Mia Catalano travel to Portland to perform at a music festival hosted by K-100, the radio station where Life Unexpected's Cate Cassidy works. The characters meet and bond as a result.

== Themes ==
One Tree Hill consists of various themes, such as love, friendship, rivalries and betrayal, and explores the reasons behind them. Neal Solon of DVD Verdict stated, "Much of the show is based on the mistakes the teens' parents have made and the way these mistakes manifest themselves in the students' lives." Two of the show's most prominent themes have been basketball and romance.

=== Basketball ===
Lucas and Nathan during the basketball game at the climax of the pilot episode. The pilot is considered one of the show's "most essential" episodes.

Basketball is a core aspect of the show, helping to create an atmosphere of masculinity and attract male viewers. TheCinemaSource.com said of the show's early seasons, "The only thing you might notice that's strange is that the teens' school lives are heavily focused on basketball and cheerleading. If they do happen to be in a classroom, the only teacher they have is Coach Whitey."

Schwahn stated of the basketball element, "A lot of times, the basketball games for us are like the crimes, or it's the courtroom, the police precinct, or the medical operating arena – it was like our home turf." He said the other shows rarely focus on the court case or medical problem being dealt with, but are more about the people. "For us, that's what basketball was. It was never about playing basketball, but it was about what was happening to the people when this game or tournament was approaching."

In season 2, the basketball drama was completely removed from the series, as executives felt that the show was geared more toward a male audience. David Janollari, then entertainment president at The WB, attributed the show's sophomore success partly to its shift in focus from a male-driven sports plot to expanding the stories of its girls. He felt they had time to "step back and learn from audience response" and that Schwahn tailored the show toward the "core audience". Schwahn said, "Girls watch the show in large numbers. [In the first season], the girls were sort of appendages to the boys." Show producer Joe Davola and Schwahn agreed with "sex sells" and "skin to win" sentiments for storyline directions. Less time on the basketball court could afford One Tree Hill more time for plots fueled by sex and drugs. Lack of basketball drama, however, meant a decrease in male viewership. In a 2006 interview, Schwahn said, "In the second TV season, we didn't play any basketball, which was the rest of their junior year, and I felt that the show suffered a little bit."

=== Romance ===
Schwahn made Lucas and Peyton's love story a central theme of the show, saying he "designed a world where Peyton and Lucas were meant to be together" and that "the seeds were planted for [Lucas] to pick Peyton in the pilot – in [that] first episode ... When Lucas is at the Rivercourt at the end of that pilot, you know. I think we feel like this is the girl [who] is his soulmate. And, you know, the pilot ends with him saying, 'I'll be seeing you.'"

Lucas and Peyton have been referred to as star-crossed. Schwahn described the theme of their relationship as "two kids that carry around the weight of the world quite a bit. Can they agree together to let go of that weight? The theme for Lucas and Peyton is, 'How do you learn to be happy when you've spent so much time carrying grief around? Do you feel guilty for being happy? Is it OK to let it go?'" The couple was also given theme music to enhance the scenes where Lucas rescues Peyton (from despair, dangerous situations, or herself). The theme, titled "Saving Peyton", was composed by John Nordstrom and first heard in the school shooting episode "With Tired Eyes, Tired Minds, Tired Souls, We Slept", in which Lucas strives to save a dying Peyton.

Making Lucas and Peyton the central love story created a rivalry between their fans and those who would prefer him to be with or end up with Brooke. "[These] are two very passionate camps. And don't think I don't know it," stated Schwahn. "I think sometimes one camp thinks they're being ignored." Schwahn said that although he designed Lucas and Peyton to be together from the start, this did not preclude Brooke and Lucas ending up together, and that he was aware of the "great chemistry" between their portrayers, real-life ex-spouses Murray and Bush. He was not stubbornly holding on to the idea of [Lucas and Peyton]. He also denied some speculation according to which Murray and Bush's divorce affected the writing in regard to the love triangle's resolution, confirming that every decision concerning Brooke and Lucas' relationship (and thus also their definitive break-up) was made independently and regardless of the actors' private issues. Schwahn said the Peyton-Lucas-Brooke love triangle is also by design and became a staple of the show. "There is a huge fanbase dedicated to Brooke and Lucas, and sometimes [those people] feel a bit betrayed, just as the fanbase dedicated to Peyton and Lucas felt betrayed [in season 2 and parts of season 3]", said Schwahn. "That tells me that we've done things correctly – that's the strength of a love triangle."

One debate concerned the season 2 episode "Don't Take Me For Granted", in which Lucas says that a girl is "slipping away" and he needs to confess his love for her, but shows up at Brooke's house instead of Peyton's. Most viewers (including Lucas–Peyton and Brooke–Lucas fans) had trouble interpreting the "slipping away" line as a reference to Brooke, since Peyton had been the girl Lucas had been in love with in season 1 and the two had since become estranged. Sources cited fans as pondering four questions: When was Brooke slipping away? Did Lucas simply mean he did not want to lose her? Was it a plot device to make it seem like Peyton? Or was it Peyton? Speculation that Murray and Bush's marriage affected Lucas's sudden and forced change of heart was also discussed. Schwahn stated:

That's a much debated line... "I feel like she's slipping away." Obviously, I planted it there and specifically then cut from his words to a close up of Peyton because I wanted to tell the audience, "Well, he's talking about Peyton. Clearly, he's talking about Peyton." As we know, that wasn't ultimately where his journey led him and it's been debated online and in certain circles that he never really said who it was. So there are camps that root for Lucas and Peyton and camps that root for Brooke and Lucas, and camps that root for others, which is all good for the show.

The show's other prominent romantic pairing, Nathan and Haley, also garnered considerable fan and media attention along with Lucas and Peyton. James Lafferty, Nathan's portrayer, said, "Well Schwahn always says that he had that sort of as an 'ace in the hole' the entire time. As he was writing the pilot script, he was planning on doing that, he really didn't know how it would pan out or what would happen. But, the fans have responded so passionately towards it, and I'm not really sure why." However, Lafferty has said that there is a genuine relationship between Nathan and Haley: "It started as something sort of based on betrayal and deceit. It then kind of transgressed over into something based on actual true love. So, I think that it's a transition that the fans really bought into, and I think that people really enjoy to watch." Schwahn called the couple "gold" and said, "I love Nathan and Haley, and most of our audience does as well." He said that Nathan and Haley's fan base is strong because they have always been the most stable couple on the show, admitting that it confuses him when people ask when he is going to let them be happy. "They have a lot of obstacles come their way," said Schwahn, "but I see them growing – especially with the jump [the four years that elapse between seasons 4 and 5] ahead and aging them a little bit – I see them growing into some really great places, not only as individuals, but as a family."

== Reception ==
=== Critical reception ===
Cosmopolitan, Digital Spy and Entertainment Weekly listed the series as one of the greatest teen dramas of all time, TheWrap named it one of the shows that can be watched at any age.

The first season received mixed reviews. Critics compared it to The O.C. and Dawson's Creek, but with a more masculine appeal. "Where Dawson's was about relationships, especially between boys and girls, One Tree Hill tries to be about masculinity, especially as negotiated through sports", wrote Tracy McLoone of PopMatters, who predicted that, despite this, it would probably be pinned as a girl's show. "This doesn't mean boys won't watch it, just that they won't talk about it." Allison McCracken of flowtv.org, on the other hand, called it a "boy soap opera", saying, "The new boy-centered soap employs 'feminine' generic serial elements to explore male adolescence and relationships between males, often focusing around brothers or fathers & sons" and "the boy soap is as pleasurable a text for female viewers as television offers today." Chris Carle of IGN said: "One Tree Hill, like The O.C. is helping to infuse network television with a much-needed renaissance of teen drama. The series is a bit less fun and more dramatic than Fox's, and the themes and storylines hold a little more gravity than The O.C.'s sometimes soap opera dynamic, but it's a solid show." Keith Helinski of Moviefreak.com disagreed with The O.C. comparisons, feeling that Summerland is similar to The O.C. with its "scenarios and settings, while One Tree Hill is more suited as a Dawson's Creek knock off." The Wall Street Journal called the show "a slick prime-time drama about a small town packed with hunky teenagers and simmering family secrets," while The Star-Ledger said it was "a welcome surprise ... Every choice it makes from pacing to photography to music seems just about right, and the casting is inspired." Alynda Wheat of Entertainment Weekly called the show a "guilty pleasure" and said they had not had one "this guilty" since Melrose Place, adding that the characters' relationships change quickly. However, Wheat criticized the lack of parents in most of the teenage characters' lives. "Any time order threatens to reign, the writers ship out the parents – to Italy, a boating accident, whatever," said Wheat.

AOL TV placed the show in its list of TV's Biggest Guilty Pleasures. Daniel Fienberg of Zap2it said that while the show has all the elements that make for a good show about teenagers/young adults, "it's also a show that has stubbornly refused to be categorized merely as a guilty pleasure and its myriad artistic pretensions – Lucas's Bartlett's Familiar Quotations-spewing narration, Peyton's (Hilarie Burton) pedantic lectures on indie rock, countless expositional monologues lifted from a Philosophy 101 lecture—have often rendered it merely bad, rather than so-bad-its-good". Fienberg did, however, compliment the school shooting episode. Cynthia Boris of DVD Verdict, on the other hand, said, "One Tree Hill doesn't claim to be anything more than it is. They acknowledge that they're a teen fantasy complete with an appropriately emo WB soundtrack." Ginia Bellefante of The New York Times criticized the show's lack of insight into the consequences of teenage pregnancy, stating that "the show displays an almost aggressive aversion to moralizing about teenage pregnancy" and that by "refusing to lay out the grim consequences of premature motherhood, it seems as if it wants to make fans on either end of the political spectrum stick their heads in fiery hampers". Author Emily B. Anzicek said that pregnancy seems to be the only possible physical consequence for the residents of One Tree Hill and that discussion of STDs is non-existent, criticizing the "potential threat" due to the amount of promiscuity, such as several characters having sex with people they hardly know. "Of all the episodes in the first three seasons, there are two mentions of condoms. One happens when Deb catches Brooke and Lucas at the drug store buying condoms and whipped cream", said Anzicek. "The second happens in season two when Brooke throws a wedding reception for Nathan and Haley and decorates the room with condoms blown up like balloons." Anzicek said the teenagers, who are only supposed to be sixteen and seventeen at this time, are presented as very sexually experienced, especially Brooke, and that the one exception is Haley.

Ian Arbuckle of CHUD.com complimented the series on its musical aspects and flexibility, feeling that "One Tree Hill is firmly couched in both the pop television and pop music traditions" and that the show "doesn't focus exclusively on the teenagers, but also stretches out to include dedicated subplots for their parents and other adults." Chris Carle of IGN said, "Like the series itself, the offering is a little more adult (read: adult contemporary) and a little less fresh than other similar soundtracks. It's not without its standouts, but overall the selection is plucked from the lighter fare on alt rock radio." Arbuckle stated that the show adds division between the teenagers and adults by having the teenagers focus on love and the adults focus on revenge. One of the audience's main concerns had been which girl Lucas would end up with. Writing for DVD Verdict, Neal Solon commended the series' first season for being about more than betrayal and questionable morals, and instead highlighting the impact of the parents' mistakes on the teenagers' lives, which was something he identified as lacking in other teen shows. He felt that the season 1 finale was strong partly because its creators did not know if the WB would renew the show. "The last few episodes bring some form of closure to the major story arcs, while leaving the door wide open for further development should the show continue. It is an artfully employed strategy that paid off", he said.

Although the second season was the show's highest-rated, it was criticized in terms of quality. The complaints included the loss of basketball, confusion created about the Peyton–Lucas–Brooke love triangle, stereotypical backstabbing and plotting and Dan being turned into an almost cartoon-ish villain. Arbuckle said, "Dan is a jealous man, and the writers come dangerously close to making him nothing more than an evil man." Amy Kane of Film.com called the character "the most ridiculous villain never to twirl a mustache". Although Arbuckle called the plot-level elements satisfying, he criticized the dialogue, saying that the writers fail to convince with the slang or Black English of the teenagers, or the language of businessmen. He credited male viewers with watching partly for the physically attractive girls. One of the more complimented additions to season 2 was character Anna Taggaro, credited by AfterEllen.com as the first recurring bisexual character of color on television; some fans, however, debated whether the character was bisexual or gay.

TheCinemaSource.com said the show's third season dialogue is "clever and sarcastic from the last word of a scene to the very first of the next" and complimented "Dan's witty comeback lines". By the fourth season, the show had shifted to melodrama.

The fifth season's timeline skip, showing the characters in their lives after high school and college, was successful, and is thought to have successfully avoided jumping the shark; viewership also returned to an all-time high. BuddyTV's Don Williams said, "The fifth season of One Tree Hill completely reinvented the series. ... It was a risky move, but one that ultimately paid off." Conversely, Ginia Bellefante of The New York Times stated, "Not one of the newly minted 22-year-olds on One Tree Hill blogs or dresses coolly or speaks cleverly or gives any indication of having learned anything at all in college." She characterized the portrayal of twenty-somethings as "so wildly inauthentic and unfamiliar as to make watching it feel like foreign correspondence", but added that the show was "a no-arrogance, no-entitlement zone" and that she was content to continue watching it.

=== U.S. television ratings ===
The series premiere was watched by 2.5 million viewers and achieved a 1.9 Adults 18–49 rating on September 23, 2003. The following week, it rose to 3.3 million and a 2.4 demographic, becoming one of the three shows to rise in its second episode in the 2003–2004 TV season.

The CW only attracts a fraction of the audience its competitors do. "So the strategy is super-serving a young coveted demographic. The network's sweet spot is women 18–34 and with a viewer median age of 33, it boasts the youngest audience among its broadcast competitors by almost a dozen years." Averaging about 4.3 million viewers weekly, season two was One Tree Hill's highest-rated season. During this season, the show emerged as one of The WB's hits. "Of all the shows that they've launched in the last two years, this one has the most traction", said Stacey Lynn Koerner, at the time an executive vice president at Initiative, a media planning agency. "It does have an audience it's connecting with – a loyal audience that comes back week in and week out." The show was particularly popular among the young viewership. It became the first choice of prime-time television for teenage girls and was reported in January 2005 to be the program in Tuesday's 9 pm time slot most viewed by women aged 12 to 34.

The series finale was the highest rated among women 18–34 (1.4/4) for the CW in more than a year. It was the CW's best Wednesday night in adults 18–34 since premiere week which took place on September 14, 2011, and best adults 18–49 and women 18–49 ratings since December 7, 2011. Comparing to a year earlier, One Tree Hill's last episode was up 50% in adults 18–34, 40% in women 18–34 and 33% in adults 18–49. The first hour of the finale event, a series of interviews with the cast, garnered approximately 1.37 million viewers, with 1.42 million tuning in for the actual series finale.

Below are the seasonal rankings (based on average total viewers per episode) of One Tree Hill on the WB and the CW.

Season	Timeslot	Network	Season premiere	Season finale	TV season	Overall rank	Network rank	Viewers (in millions)	Rating
1	Tuesday 9:00 p.m.	The WB	September 23, 2003	May 11, 2004	2003–2004	#136	#8	3.84	1.5
2	Tuesday 9:00 p.m.	The WB	September 21, 2004	May 24, 2005	2004–2005	#129	#2	4.34	1.9
3	Wednesday 8:00 p.m.	The WB	October 5, 2005	May 3, 2006	2005–2006	#137	#9	3.06	1.2
4	Wednesday 9:00 p.m.	The CW	September 27, 2006	June 13, 2007	2006–2007	#133	#8	2.94	1.3
5	Tuesday 9:00 p.m. (episodes 1–12); Monday 9:00 p.m. (episodes 13–18)	The CW	January 8, 2008	May 19, 2008	2007–2008	#122	#6	2.92	1.3
6	Monday 9:00 p.m.	The CW	September 1, 2008	May 18, 2009	2008–2009	#110	#4	2.84	1.42
7	Monday 8:00 p.m.	The CW	September 14, 2009	May 17, 2010	2009–2010	#115	#7	2.28	1.1
8	Tuesday 8:00 p.m.	The CW	September 14, 2010	May 17, 2011	2010–2011	#129	#9	1.78	0.8
9	Wednesday 8:00 p.m.	The CW	January 11, 2012	April 4, 2012	2011–2012	#159	#3	1.48	0.99

=== Awards and accolades ===
Over its nine-year run, One Tree Hill was nominated for and won various awards, most commonly being honored by the Teen Choice Awards.

Year	Award	Category	Nominee(s)	Result
2004	Teen Choice Awards	Choice Breakout TV Show	One Tree Hill	Nominated
2004	Teen Choice Awards	Choice TV Show – Drama/Action Adventure	One Tree Hill	Nominated
2004	Teen Choice Awards	Choice Breakout TV Star – Male	Chad Michael Murray	Won
2004	Teen Choice Awards	Choice Breakout TV Star – Male	James Lafferty	Nominated
2004	Teen Choice Awards	Choice Breakout TV Star – Female	Hilarie Burton	Nominated
2004	Teen Choice Awards	Choice Breakout TV Star – Female	Bethany Joy Lenz	Nominated
2004	Teen Choice Awards	Choice TV Sidekick	Bethany Joy Lenz	Nominated
2004	Teen Choice Awards	Choice TV Actor – Drama/Action Adventure	Chad Michael Murray	Nominated
2004	Teen Choice Awards	Choice TV Actress – Drama/Action Adventure	Hilarie Burton	Nominated
2005	Teen Choice Awards	Choice TV Show: Drama	One Tree Hill	Nominated
2005	Teen Choice Awards	Choice TV Actor: Drama	Chad Michael Murray	Nominated
2005	Teen Choice Awards	Choice TV Actress: Drama	Hilarie Burton	Nominated
2005	Teen Choice Awards	Choice TV Actress: Drama	Sophia Bush	Nominated
2005	Teen Choice Awards	Choice TV Breakout Performance – Male	Tyler Hilton	Nominated
2005	Teen Choice Awards	Choice TV Chemistry	Chad Michael Murray and James Lafferty	Nominated
2005	Teen Choice Awards	Choice TV Parental Units	Moira Kelly	Nominated
2006	Image Awards	Outstanding Directing in a Dramatic Series	Janice Cooke	Nominated
2006	Prism Award	Performance in a Drama Series Storyline	Chad Michael Murray	Nominated
2006	Teen Choice Awards	Choice TV Actor: Drama/Action Adventure	Chad Michael Murray	Nominated
2006	Teen Choice Awards	Choice TV Actress: Drama/Action Adventure	Sophia Bush	Nominated
2006	Teen Choice Awards	Choice TV Drama/Action Adventure Show	One Tree Hill	Nominated
2008	Teen Choice Awards	Choice TV Show: Drama	One Tree Hill	Nominated
2008	Teen Choice Awards	Choice TV Actor: Drama	Chad Michael Murray	Won
2008	Teen Choice Awards	Choice TV Actress: Drama	Hilarie Burton	Nominated
2008	Teen Choice Awards	Choice TV Actress: Drama	Sophia Bush	Nominated
2010	Teen Choice Awards	Choice TV Actress: Drama	Sophia Bush	Nominated
2010	Teen Choice Awards	Choice TV: Female Scene Stealer	Bethany Joy Lenz	Nominated
2010	Teen Choice Awards	Choice TV: Male Scene Stealer	James Lafferty	Nominated
2010	Teen Choice Awards	Choice TV: Parental Unit	James Lafferty and Bethany Joy Lenz	Nominated
2017	Teen Choice Awards	Choice Throwback TV Show	One Tree Hill	Won
2018	Teen Choice Awards	Choice Throwback TV Show	One Tree Hill	Nominated

== Distribution ==
On February 7, 2007, Soapnet announced that it would broadcast reruns of The O.C. and One Tree Hill. The deal, made with the show's production company, Warner Bros. Television, stated that Soapnet retained the option of picking up the fifth season for syndication. Soapnet did so, starting to air season 5 episodes in January 2009.

In India, One Tree Hill premiered on Star World India on February 27, 2013. Star World India aired seasons 1 to 7 of the show at 10 pm on weekdays and season 8 and 9 at 7 pm on weekdays. One Tree Hill ended its run on Star World India on November 14, 2013. In Australia, One Tree Hill premiered on the Nine Network in December 2003, but the channel pulled the show after 3 episodes due to low ratings. It was subsequently picked up by Network Ten, with the channel airing seasons 1–2 and 4–6 with re-runs airing on both Network Ten and its Digital channel "Eleven". The show was aired in its entirety (seasons 1–9) on the paid service, Foxtel on the Arena channel. In Philippines, One Tree Hill premiered on RPN on March 7, 2007.

The entire series was available on internet streaming service Netflix until October 1, 2017.

It was announced on January 17, 2018, that the entire One Tree Hill series would be available on Hulu starting February 1, 2018.

=== Home media ===
Seasons 1–9 of One Tree Hill were released on DVD in regions 1, 2 and 4, with commentary on selected episodes by cast and crew members, deleted scenes, gag reels and featurettes. Four box set collectors' editions were released: the first in August 2009 containing the complete seasons 1–6, and the second in August 2010 containing seasons 1–7 and in 2011 seasons 1–8. On May 12, 2012, the upcoming availability of a complete box set of the entire series was announced; it was released on June 11, 2012. This box set was initially for sale in the UK only; however, the set became available in Australia on October 31, 2012.

Complete season	Release dates		
Complete season	Region 1	Region 2	Region 4
1	January 25, 2005	September 5, 2005	February 1, 2006
2	September 13, 2005	April 10, 2006	September 6, 2006
3	September 26, 2006	October 23, 2006	July 4, 2007
4	December 18, 2007	April 7, 2008	June 4, 2008
5	August 26, 2008	October 6, 2008	April 1, 2009
6	August 25, 2009	October 5, 2009	February 3, 2010
7	August 17, 2010	October 11, 2010	May 4, 2011
8	December 20, 2011	November 7, 2011	February 1, 2012
9	April 10, 2012	June 11, 2012	September 12, 2012
Complete series	June 11, 2012	June 11, 2012	October 31, 2012

== Reboot ==
On August 30, 2024, it was announced that actresses Hilarie Burton Morgan, Sophia Bush and Danneel Ackles – who portrayed Peyton Sawyer, Brooke Davis and Rachel Gatina in the original series, respectively – were developing a reboot of the series with Netflix. Bush and Burton are set to reprise their roles in the series and also serve as executive producers. Ackles and her husband Jensen are also billed as executive producers through their Chaos Machine production company. The new series "take[s] place 20 years later following best friends Brooke and Peyton who are now parents to teens and facing challenges not unfamiliar to what they tackled in the original series like love, insecurities and grief".
