= Bethany Joy Lenz =

American actress

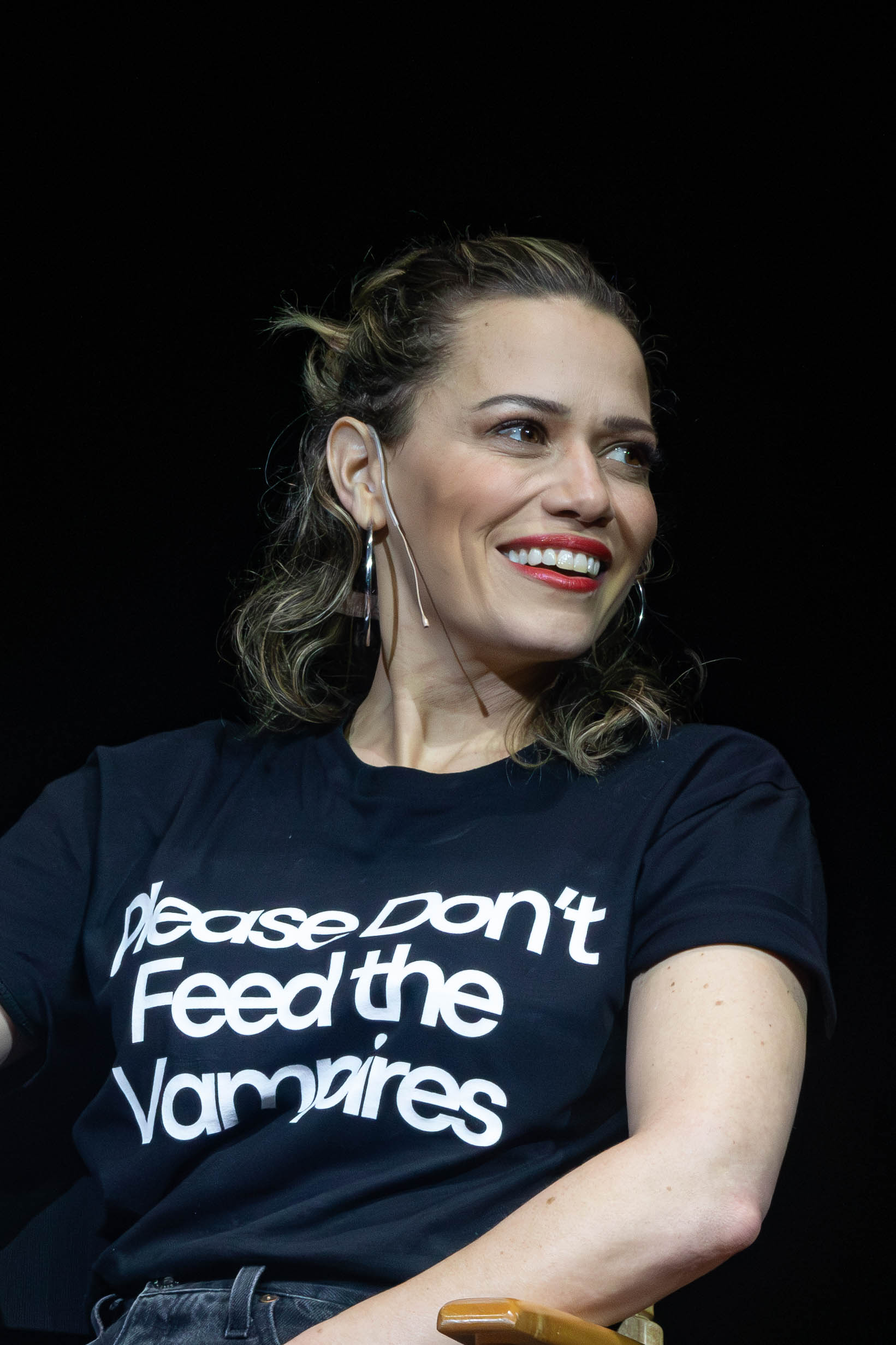
- Lenz in 2024
- Other names: Bethany Joy; Joy Lenz; Bethany Joy Galeotti; Joie Lenz
- Occupations: Actress; musician
- Years active: 1988–present
- Spouse: Michael Galeotti (m. 2005; div. 2012)
- Children: 1

Bethany Joy Lenz is an American actress and musician. She is known for her portrayal of Haley James Scott on the television drama One Tree Hill (2003–2012). She also starred as Michelle Bauer Santos on the soap opera Guiding Light (1998–2000) and is recognized for her music as a solo artist and as a member of the band Everly. Between 2021 and 2025, Lenz served as a co-host of the Drama Queens podcast alongside former One Tree Hill cast members.

== Acting ==
While on a trip to Los Angeles, Lenz landed her first professional job in a commercial for dolls from the teen drama series Swans Crossing. Lenz eventually went on to appear in commercials for Eggo Waffles, Dr Pepper, and others. She continued to find work steadily as an actress, and by her second year in high school she landed the role of Linda Halleck in Stephen King's Thinner. She appeared in various pilots, commercials, and films and performed regional theatre until she was eventually cast as a series regular on Guiding Light.

At age 17, Lenz played the teenage clone of Reva Shayne on the CBS Daytime soap opera Guiding Light for nine episodes. Her stint earned her such favorable reviews from viewers, critics, and Guiding Light executives alike that Lenz was eventually recast as Michelle Bauer Santos upon Rebecca Budig's exit. This unusual move was described as "unheard of" in the industry according to CBS producer Mickey Dwyer-Dobbin. In 1999, while working on Guiding Light, she graduated from Eastern Christian High School in New Jersey. She also landed the role of Rose Cronin in Mary and Rhoda, a made-for-television movie that reunited Mary Tyler Moore and Valerie Harper as Mary Richards and Rhoda Morgenstern. At the time Lenz juggled a heavy storyline, a television movie portraying Mary Tyler Moore's daughter, a one-year run of a New York cabaret called Foxy Ladies Love/Boogie 70's Explosion, and the lead role in an independent film. Lenz also filmed two pilots: one playing the daughter of Paul Sorvino, and the other as the lead in the WB's 1972.

After her two-year contract with The Guiding Light ended, she left her role as Michelle Bauer Santos and moved from New York City to Los Angeles. In Los Angeles, Lenz was directed by Garry Marshall playing Pinky Tuscadero in Happy Days: the Musical (musical directors Carole King and Paul Williams) and by Arthur Allan Seidleman in a staged reading of a musical version of The Outsiders. During this time, Lenz also landed guest appearances on Off Centre, Charmed, Felicity, Maybe It's Me and The Guardian. In 2002 Lenz joined the cast of Bring It On Again as Marni Potts, the co-captain of the varsity cheerleading squad.

When she was 22, Lenz was cast in the WB television series One Tree Hill. She originally auditioned for the roles of Brooke Davis and Haley James. She landed the role of Haley James, the quintessential girl-next-door, who is best friends with Lucas Scott, portrayed by Chad Michael Murray, and wife of Nathan Scott, portrayed by James Lafferty. During her time on One Tree Hill, Lenz was also offered the role of Belle in Beauty and the Beast when it was still in production on Broadway, but turned it down due to scheduling conflicts. Lenz appeared in an episode of Life Unexpected alongside Kate Voegele as part of a crossover-event between One Tree Hill and Life Unexpected.

In the sixth season, Lenz made her directorial debut. She initially approached producer Greg Prange in 2007 with the idea of directing but was not given the opportunity to do so until two years later. Over the course of season six Lenz shadowed several directors, watched them prepare, and went on location scouts. Lenz directed two more episodes.

After eight seasons on air, One Tree Hill returned for thirteen episodes in its ninth and final season. The show ended on April 4, 2012.

In 2012, Lenz decided to concentrate on projects that were "strategically designed to move her career in a direction that was not quite the same thing as she was doing on One Tree Hill". In September 2012, it was confirmed that Lenz would guest star on an episode of Men at Work. She played the role of Meg, a single mother who the character Tyler begins to date. She said the first few days were hard because she had not done comedy for some time.

In March 2013, it was confirmed that Lenz would have a recurring role on Dexter. Her character Cassie was described as "an attractive former finance executive looking for a quieter life". Lenz's character appeared in four episodes of the final season.

In late September 2013, Lenz landed the role of Lauren Byrd on the pilot Songbyrd for E! The show centered around Lauren, a genius songwriter who employs a small staff, including her sister, to enable and manage her eccentric, yet wildly successful process. Production for Songbyrd began in late January 2014 in New York City, but the show was not picked up by E!

In the second quarter of 2015, Lenz was cast in the Shonda Rhimes drama, The Catch, for ABC, playing the role of Zoe. On May 18, 2015, Lenz revealed she was being replaced; she wrote, "Looks like they need a different type for Zoe, so I'll be replaced," though she still encouraged fans to watch the show.

Early in 2016, Lenz starred in her friend Kristin Fairweather's first short film, Grace. She also appeared in March 2016 in two episodes of third season of Agents of S.H.I.E.L.D. In mid-2016, she was cast in the new drama American Gothic as a character named April.

From 2021 to 2025, Lenz was a co-host on the Drama Queens podcast along with her former One Tree Hill co-stars Sophia Bush, Hilarie Burton Morgan and Robert Buckley.

== Music ==
After Lenz's exit from Guiding Light, she completed a demo of original music. Trained by the director of the Brooklyn College of Opera, Lenz plays the guitar and piano and writes her own music. Her first album, entitled Preincarnate, was released in October 2002. She worked under the direction of director Garry Marshall and alongside musician Carole King on a new musical adapted from the series Happy Days. She also took the opportunity to work in a public reading of a musical version of the novel The Outsiders directed by Arthur Allan Seidelman.

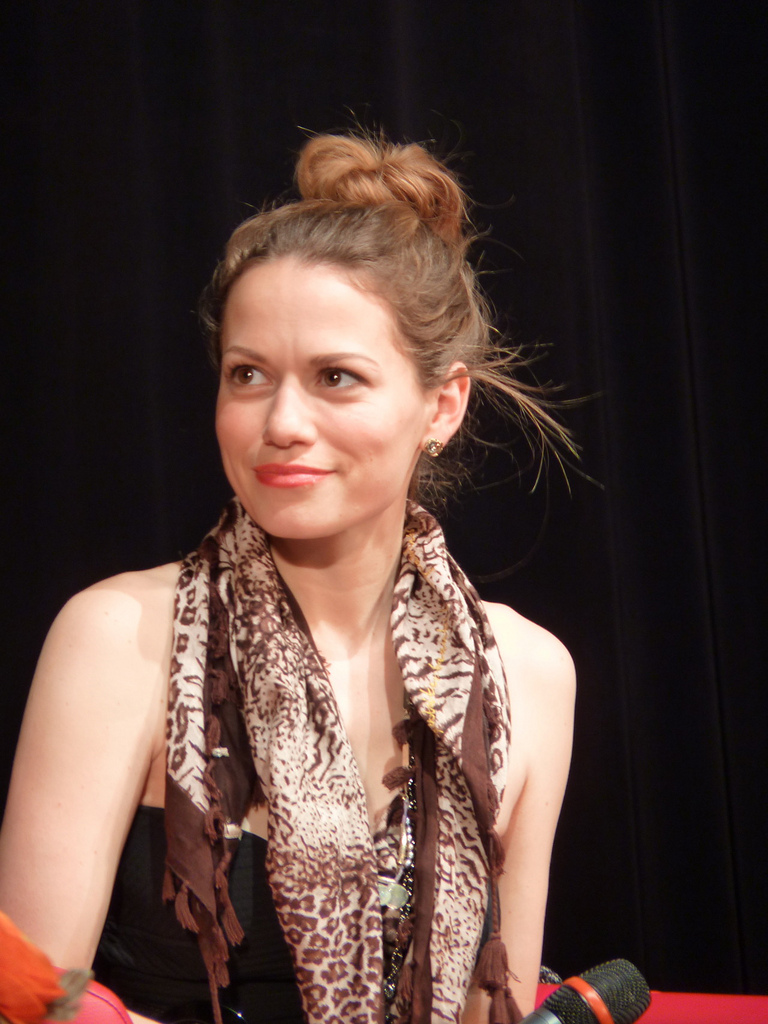
Lenz in France at the 2012 OTH Convention

While working on One Tree Hill she continued to release new music. In 2005, after recording "When the Stars Go Blue" with costar Tyler Hilton, the duo joined The Wreckers (Michelle Branch and Jessica Harp), and Gavin DeGraw for a 25-city North American One Tree Hill Tour that started in Vancouver. Lenz and Hilton scored the No. 89 spot in February 2005's Billboard Pop 100 chart with the duet "When the Stars Go Blue". While on tour, Lenz debuted her second independent record entitled, Come On Home, and filmed her first music video for "Songs in My Pockets" at Coney Island Beach and Astroland in Brooklyn, New York.

In 2006, alongside ex–American Idol judge Kara DioGuardi, Lenz co-wrote and recorded "Halo" which was released on the second volume of the One Tree Hill Soundtrack. During this time, Lenz signed a deal with Sony Epic Records and worked with her producer, Ron Aniello (Lifehouse, Guster, Barenaked Ladies) to record original material. In 2006, after changes within the company, Lenz left the label. Despite this setback, Lenz traveled to Los Angeles to write and record several songs for the soundtrack for Ten Inch Hero in 2006. Lenz's split with Epic allowed her to sign with the independent record label Hillasterion.

In 2008, Lenz formed the band Everly with her friend Amber Sweeney. Immediately after the duo was formed, they teamed up with musical act Angels & Airwaves and Kate Voegele for a live USO concert event for military personnel. This was filmed and formed the basis for a One Tree Hill episode, titled "Even Fairy Tale Characters Would Be Jealous".

In 2012, the Everly band split after four years of collaboration, the two artists preferring to focus on their solo careers. In November of the same year, Lenz joined fellow One Tree Hill co-star Michael Grubbs of the band Wakey!Wakey! and other singers at the Gramercy Theatre in New York City for the BTF Concerts: Rock The Schools 2012 concert. She performed new songs and two duets with Grubbs entitled "I Know" and "Irresistible". At the concert, she sold a 9-song CD entitled Then Slowly Grows.

During an interview with Shine On Media in May 2013, Lenz stated she was meeting with long-time friend and music producer Jeff Cohen to record an album. On May 22, 2013, Lenz tweeted a picture of the recording studio. The caption read, "Recording new music in #Nashville with old pal Jeff Cohen! #LeavingTownAlive #CrazyGirls" On June 4, 2013, Lenz tweeted "Sneak peek at my new album..." and linked a video on WhoSay to a new song "Please".

During an interview with Mary Ann Albright in late July 2013, Lenz talked about her musical career plans. She shared her intention to release her first full-length studio album, entitled Your Woman in the near future as an independent release on her blog. Lenz went on to say, "The best way I can describe this album is Patsy Cline meets Paula Cole meets Sam Cooke."

On August 10, 2013, the song "Please" featuring Lenz was released on vibedeck and August 11 on iTunes for her fans after she had performed it at the Rock the Schools Concert in 2012. On July 18, 2014, Lenz released "Calamity Jane" on iTunes. The song was a teaser for her soon-to-be-released album. Lenz stated: "While I'm reworking my album, here's a little teaser. This song will sound totally different on the new record, but I thought you'd enjoy hearing this version." On July 21, the song was on her WhoSay site and later on her SoundCloud site.

In November 2014, Lenz created a Kickstarter fundraising page for her new EP. Production on the EP began in early December. As well as supporting the new EP, fans were able to give back to the charity Stop the Traffik. The project, entitled "Get Back to Gold" was released (iTunes, Amazon.com) on December 23, 2014, and was a sneak peek for her new album.

Lenz later formed Joy Lenz and the Firepit Band. The lineup consists of WhiteRose (Danny Shyman) on guitar, Doo Crowder on vocals and guitar, Ben Zelico on drums and Meaghan Maples and Brittany Gilmore as back up singers. They toured from May to July 2016 and said an album was in preparation for 2017.

In December 2020, Lenz released her first solo Christmas album, entitled Snow. The album was produced by Mike Bundlie and released under Poets Road Records. It featured six songs, with four being originals by Lenz. The song "My Christmas with You" features Anthony Evans from the Voice and "Listen" features her daughter.

In November 2025, Lenz and former One Tree Hill co-star Tyler Hilton released an album titled Well Well Well with covers of well-known songs that were featured in One Tree Hill.

=== The Notebook musical ===
In 2005, after seeing Nick Cassavetes' film The Notebook and subsequently reading Nicholas Sparks' best selling novel of the same name, Lenz found herself singing songs around her house based on the story's characters. After six weeks, she decided to put them down on paper. She brought the idea to her producer Ron Aniello and they decided to form Galeotti & Aniello Productions. On December 7, 2006, Lenz revealed on her website bethanyjoylenz.com that they were writing a musical. After finishing the libretto, Lenz passed it on to a friend close to the Sparks family who gave it to the book's author. He loved it and she procured the rights to the musical.

The auditions took place in early August 2009 at Thalian Hall. Paul Teal and Kendra Goehring-Garett were cast as lead roles of Noah and Alli. The Notebook musical was workshopped in a small black box theater in October 2009 in front of Broadway producers and investors, and Nicholas Sparks who came for the occasion. Lenz said that all the feedback the she and Aniello received was positive. The producers said the music was "amazing" and did not require any modification, and "everybody loved the dialogue, and they thought the story was well-crafted". On the playbill, she thanks some friends from One Tree Hill cast, including Paul Johansson, Allison Munn, and Jana Kramer.

On February 10 and 11, 2010, Lenz revealed on Facebook that she was recording songs with the other singers for the musical. On March 6, 2010, Lenz said that she was rewriting passages including some songs. In July 2010, the duo revealed on their website the list of the songs : "The Colors Play", "Carolina Moon", "Troublesome Tongue", "Sunday Train", "The Nightclub Swing!", "Think of Me (When You are Gone)", "Psalm 148", "My Christmas With You" and "The Luckiest Girl". They were written by both Lenz and Aniello.

In November 2010, in response to Twitter followers successfully raising more than $2000 in one day for the charity Love146, Lenz released the song "Troublesome Tongue". The song features Noah's father and his friends explaining Noah's childhood stutter to new love Allie (played by Lenz on the recording). In December 2010, Paul Teal, who played Noah, released the song "Sunday Train" from the demo score on YouTube. In October 2011, Lenz revealed on her website www.bethanyjoy.com that she attended the 15th anniversary for The Notebook with Nicholas Sparks, with whom she has become friends.

== Personal life ==
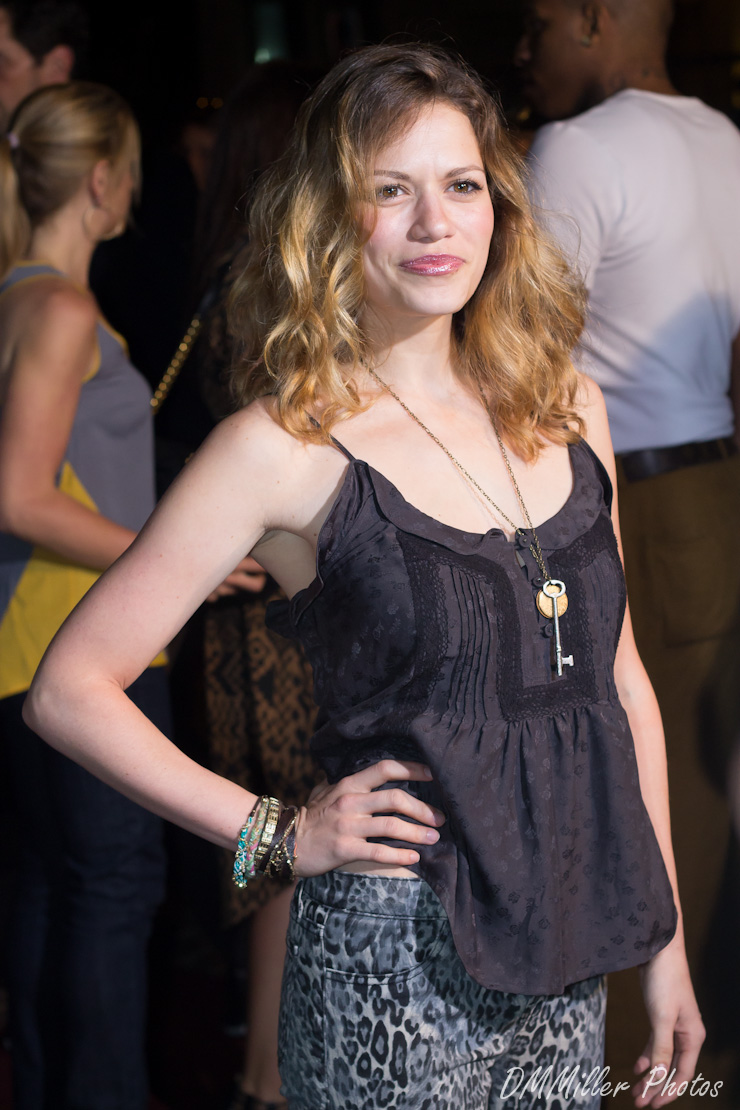
Lenz at the Nicholas Sparks Celebrity Family Weekend in 2012

Lenz married musician Michael Galeotti, formerly of the band Enation, on December 31, 2005. In 2011, Lenz gave birth to a daughter named Maria. They divorced after seven years of marriage in 2012.

During an August 2023 episode of Drama Queens, Lenz revealed that she was in a cult for 10 years. While she did not divulge the name of the group, in interviews she stated that she was a part of the group during the entirety of One Tree Hill, and many castmates tried to convince her to leave. She wrote a memoir about her experience titled Dinner for Vampires, and the book was released on October 22, 2024.

== Philanthropy ==
Introduced to Love146 by former Everly bandmate, Amber Sweeney, Lenz has been actively supporting the international human rights organization largely through social media outlets. On June 12, 2011, she revealed details of her newest project – an online boutique called Lark, selling apparel with original designs by Lenz. All proceeds benefit Love146, To Write Love On Her Arms, as well as Reading is Fundamental.

=== Jewelry ===
In July 2016, Lenz designed her own jewelry line in partnership with Stilnest. She delayed the launch by one week following the attack in Nice, ultimately launching on July 23, 2016. The pieces feature a buffalo motif, which was inspired by a trip Lenz took to Fort Apache. Lenz donated ten percent of the profits to the Tanka Fund.

=== Modern Vintage ===
In 2023, Lenz said she was starting a broadsheet newspaper for women called Modern Vintage, the same name as her website, where she discusses art, culture, travel, and style.

== Filmography ==
=== Film ===
Year	Film	Role	Notes
1992	Psalty's Salvation Celebration	Shelly Barnes	
1996	Thinner	Linda Halleck	
2004	Bring It On Again	Marni Potts	
2011	Just Yell Fire: Campus Life	Herself	
2017	Extortion	Julie Riley	
2017	Snowed Inn Christmas	Jenna Hudson	Credited as Joy Lenz
2020	Blindfire	Jan	
2022	So Cold the River	Erica Shaw	

=== Television ===
Year	Title	Role	Notes
1998	1973	Lisa	Unaired television pilot
1998–2000	Guiding Light	Teenage Reva Shayne clone	Recurring role
1998–2000	Guiding Light	Michelle Bauer Santos	Main role (November 9, 1998 – September 29, 2000)
2000	Mary and Rhoda	Rose Cronin	Television film
2001	Charmed	Lady Julia	Episode: "A Knight to Remember"
2001	Felicity	Gretchen	Episode: "Oops...Noel Did It Again"
2001	Off Centre	Heather	Episode: "Feeling Shellfish"
2002	The Legacy	Jess	Unaired television pilot (UPN)
2002	Maybe It's Me	The Salesgirl	Episode: "The Romeo & Juliet Episode"
2003	The Guardian	Claire Stasiak	Episodes: "My Aim Is True", "What It Means to You"
2003–2012	One Tree Hill	Haley James Scott	Main role
2010	Life Unexpected	Haley James Scott	Episode: "Music Faced" (crossover with One Tree Hill)
2013	CSI: Crime Scene Investigation	Darcy Blaine	Episode: "Frame by Frame"
2013	Dexter	Cassie Jollenston	Recurring role (season 8)
2013	Men at Work	Meg	Episode: "Tyler the Pioneer"
2013	Sock Monkee Therapy	Holly	Episode: "Holly"
2014	The Christmas Secret	Christine Eisley	Television film
2014	Songbyrd	Lauren Byrd	Unaired television pilot
2016	Agents of S.H.I.E.L.D.	Stephanie Malick	Episodes: "Parting Shot", "Paradise Lost"
2016	American Gothic	April	3 episodes
2016	Home	Rose Bell	Unaired television pilot
2017	Colony	Morgan	Recurring role (season 2)
2017	Snowed-Inn Christmas	Jenna Hudson	Television film
2018	Good Eggs	Rebecca	Short film
2018	Grey's Anatomy	Jenny	Episodes: "1-800-799-7233", "Personal Jesus"
2018	Poinsettias for Christmas	Ellie Palmer	Television film
2018	Royal Matchmaker	Kate Gleason	Television film
2019	Bottled with Love	Abbey Lawrence	Television film
2019	Pearson	Keri Allen	Main role
2020	Five Star Christmas	Lucy Ralston	Television film
2020	Just My Type	Vanessa Sills	Television film
2020	A Valentine's Match	Natalie Simmons	Television film
2021	An Unexpected Christmas	Emily	Television film
2022	Good Sam	Amy Taylor	Episode "Keep Talking"
2023	A Biltmore Christmas	Lucy Hardgrove	Television film
2024	Savoring Paris	Ella	Television film
2026	Hope Valley: 1874	Rebecca Clarke	Main role

=== As a director or producer ===
Year	Title	Position	Notes
2008–2011	One Tree Hill	Director	Episodes: "Screenwriter's Blues", "At the Bottom of Everything", "Between Raising Hell and Amazing Grace"
2009	The Notebook musical	Writer and producer	Based on novel The Notebook by Nicholas Sparks; Co-produced by Ron Aniello
2017	Nasty Habits	Director	Episode: "Somebody's Mom"

=== Podcasts ===
Year	Title	Notes
2017	Performers Podcast	Guest
2017	Dream For Others	Guest
2019	Whine Down with Jana Kramer	Guest
2019	Scrubbing In with Becca Tilley & Tanya Rad	Guest
2020	Whine Down with Jana Kramer	Guest
2021	Deck the Hallmark	Guest
2021–2025	Drama Queens	Co-Host
2022	Dark Sanctum	Performer – Bess Houdini
2023	Scrooge: A Christmas Carol	Performer – Elizabeth
2024	Call Her Daddy	Guest

== Theater ==
Year	Title	Role	Director
1988	The Wonderful Wizard of Oz	Munchkin	
	Gypsy	Baby June	
1991	To Kill a Mockingbird	Scout	Scott Jacoby / Matt Moses
1999–2000	Foxy Ladies Love/Boogie 70's Explosion	Performer	Fritz Brekeller
2000	The Outsiders	Sandy	Arthur Allan Seidelman
2005	Happy Days	Pinky Tuscadero	Garry Marshall
2012	CATS for Cats	Performed "Macavity"	Shawn Simons
2014	One Starry Night Gala	Performed "On the Steps of the Palace"	
2018	CATstravaganza: Hamilton's Cats Musical	Performed "Buenos Aires"	

== Awards and nominations ==
Year	Award	Category	Nominated work	Result
2000	Soap Opera Digest Awards	Favorite Couple	Guiding Light (with Paul Anthony Stewart)	Nominated
2004	Teen Choice Awards	Choice Breakout TV Star Female	One Tree Hill	Nominated
2004	Teen Choice Awards	Choice Fresh Face Female	One Tree Hill	Nominated
2004	Teen Choice Awards	Choice TV Sidekick	One Tree Hill	Nominated
2007	Santa Cruz Film Festival Awards	Best Soundtrack	Ten Inch Hero	Won
2010	Teen Choice Awards	Choice Scene Stealer Female	One Tree Hill	Nominated
2010	Teen Choice Awards	Choice Parental Unit	One Tree Hill (with James Lafferty)	Nominated

== Discography ==
The following is a list of albums and songs by Bethany Joy Lenz that has been recorded.

=== Studio albums ===
Year	Title	Record label	Notes
2002	Preincarnate	Limited edition independent record	No longer available for purchase
2005	Come On Home	Limited edition independent record	No longer available for purchase
2006	The Starter Kit	Epic Records	Unreleased
2012	Then Slowly Grows	Independent Record	First released at the Rock the Schools Concert
2013	Your Woman	Victrola Records	First released at the One Tree Hill Convention 2013
2025	Well Well Well	Hooptie Tune Records	with Tyler Hilton

=== EPs ===
Year	Title	Record label	Notes
2008	Mission Bell	Hilasterion Records	Released by Everly
2009	Fireside	Hilasterion Records	Released by Everly
2010	B Tracks: Vol. 3	Hilasterion Records	Released by Everly
2010	B Tracks: Full Collection	Hilasterion Records	Released by Everly
2014	Get Back to Gold	Imagine Music	Released by Joy
2015	It's Christmas	Independent Record	Released by Joy Lenz & The Fellas
2020	Snow	Poets Road Records	Released as Bethany Joy

=== Singles ===
Year	Title	Album	Notes
1992	"God has a Plan for My Life"	Psalty's Salvation Celebration Soundtrack	
2000	"All Along"	End of August Soundtrack	Featuring Danny "The Farrow" Anniello
2002	"Ebony and Ivory" (originally by Paul McCartney)	Undercover Brother Soundtrack	Dubbed over Denise Richards' voice
2005	"When the Stars Go Blue" (originally by Ryan Adams)	One Tree Hill Soundtrack Volume 1	Duet with Tyler Hilton
2006	"Halo"	Friends with Benefit: Music from the Television Series One Tree Hill, Volume 2	Composed by Kara Dioguardi & Matthew Gerrard
2007	"Something Familiar"; "The Long Way"; "Get Your Love"	Ten Inch Hero Soundtrack	
2008	"Feel This"	Feel This – Single	Featuring Enation
2008	"I Want Something That I Want"	The One Tree Hill Sessions	Featuring Grace Potter
2009	"Quicksand"	B Tracks: Vol. 1 – Single	Released by Everly
2009	"Maybe"	B Tracks: Vol. 2 – Single	Released by Everly
2013	"Please"	Please – Single	Released by Bette featuring Bethany Joy Lenz
2014	"Calamity Jane"	Calamity Jane – Single	Previously titled "Wicked Calamity Jane"
2017	"(They Long To Be) Close To You"	Po (Original Motion Picture Soundtrack)	
2017	"How About You"	How About You (From "Snowed Inn Christmas") – Single	Duet with Andrew Walker
2023	"Strawberries"	Strawberries – Single	
2024	"Flesh & Bone"	Flesh & Bone – Single	Featuring Noah Needleman

=== Miscellaneous songs ===
- "215"
- "February Leather"
- "Cameron"
- "I'll Never Walk Alone"
- "The Loneliness is Better Near Now" Was released on her old music site back in 2005, April 13
- "One More Thing" Released by Bethany herself | Where? When? Produced by Ron Thaler, Recorded in New York City 2002
- "Ophelia" Released on September 14, 2005, as she was stuck inside waiting out Hurricane Ophelia
- "Troublesome Tongue" An exclusive track from "The Notebook" Musical | Released November 5, 2010, on mymusicstream, by Bethany herself as a thank you reward to her fans for supporting the organization Love 146 which raises awareness on child sex trafficking
- "Street Where You Live" Originally From: 1956 Broadway Musical "My Fair Lady" | An Easter treat for her fans on her blog – April 24, 2011
- "It Happens" Released on August 5, 2011 | Video Karaoke of Sugarland's "It Happens" for HelloGiggles
- "It's Magic" Released on September 29, 2011, on SoundCloud
- "Someone to Watch Over Me" Released on April 8, 2012, on WhoSay | Video Karaoke for her Novel, Diamond Gothic
- "Lullaby" Released on June 21, 2012, on WhoSay | "Just a little lullaby for the night drifters"
