= Bethany Joy Lenz discography =

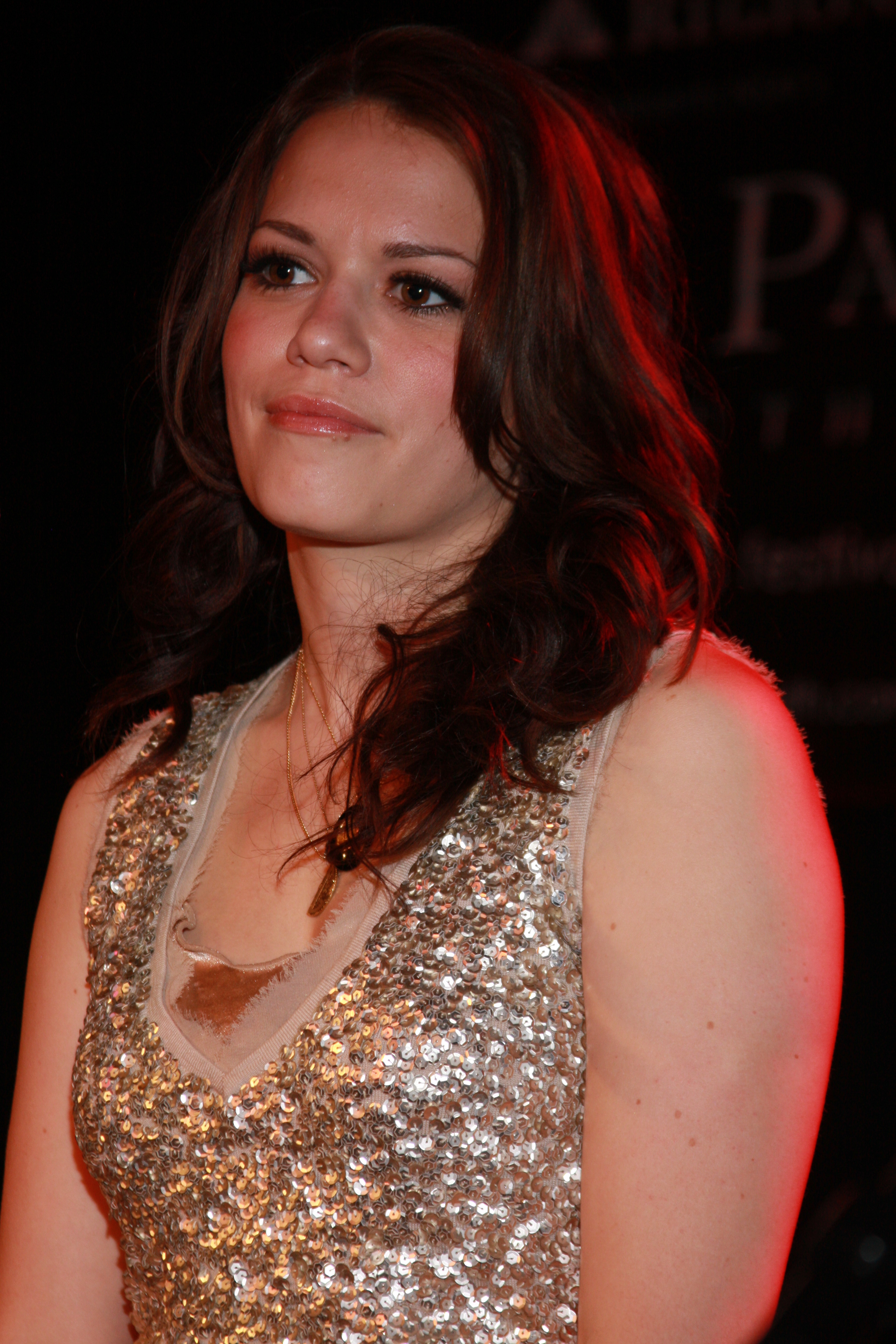
- Studio albums: 5
- Extended plays: 7
- Singles: 14
- Music videos: 1

This is the discography of American singer Bethany Joy Lenz, documenting her albums, singles and music videos. Lenz released her first album at the age of 21, after her exit from the soap Guiding Light. She then experienced success with her second album produced by her friend Jeff Cohen and sold during the OTH tour in which she performed with some co-stars from One Tree Hill. Her third album, produced by Ron Aniello, never came to life due to changes behind the label Epic Records. She then teamed up with her friend Amber Sweeney to create the duet Everly in 2008. After three albums and four years of collaboration, the band split. Soon after that, Lenz released her fourth solo album produced once again by her friend Ron Aniello, and sold during the "Rock the Schools" Concert. A year later Jeff Cohen produced her fifth solo album which was sold to attendees of the One Tree Hill Convention "From Wilmington to Paris" and later 500 autographed first edition copies of the CD were sold on Etsy. In 2015, she released a sneak peek EP of an upcoming album through Kickstarter but the hard copies promised to the backers were sent two years later and many never received it. The full album never came to life due to legal proceedings with the creator of the project. She then teamed up with artists Daniel Shyman & Doo Crowder to release two songs for Christmas 2015. And they went on tour during summer 2016 under the name of "Joy Lenz and the Fire pit Band". On December 16, 2020, she released her first solo Christmas EP entitled "Snow" produced by Mike Bundlie and released by Poets Road Records. On August 18, 2023, she dropped the single "Strawberries", released by Violet Tiger.

== Albums ==
=== Studio albums ===
Year	Title	Record label	Notes
2002	"Preincarnate"	Limited edition independent record	No longer available for purchase
2005	"Come On Home"	Limited edition independent record	No longer available for purchase
2006	"The Starter Kit"	Epic Records	Unreleased
2012	"Then Slowly Grows"	Independent Record	First sold at the Rock the Schools Concert
2013	"Your Woman"	Victrola Records	First sold at the One Tree Hill Convention 2013

=== EPs ===
Year	Title	Record label	Notes
2008	"Mission Bell – EP"	Hilasterion Records	Released as Everly
2009	"Fireside – EP"	Hilasterion Records	Released as Everly
2010	"B Tracks: Vol. 3 – EP"	Hilasterion Records	Released as Everly
2010	"B Tracks: Full Collection"	Hilasterion Records	Released as Everly
2014	"Get Back to Gold"	Imagine Music	Released as Joy
2015	"It's Christmas"	Independent Record	Released as Joy Lenz & The Fellas
2020	"Snow"	Poets Road Records	Released as Bethany Joy

== Preincarnate ==
Preincarnate

Studio album by Bethany Joy Lenz
- Released: October 2002
- Genre: Folk rock
- Label: Limited edition independent record
- Producers: Barry Solomon, Ron Thaler, and Dave Edwards

Bethany Joy Lenz chronology
Preincarnate (2002)	Come on Home (2005)

Preincarnate is a limited edition album released by Bethany Joy Lenz. The album, released in 2002, featuring eight original tracks, were all performed and written by Lenz. This album is no longer available for purchase or distribution.

=== Track listing ===
1. "Overpopulated"
2. "1972"
3. "Day After Today"
4. "Honestly"
5. "Josiah"
6. "Don't Walk Away"
7. "Las Palmas"
8. "Mr. Radioman"

== Come on Home ==
Come on Home

Studio album by Bethany Joy Lenz
- Released: on the One Tree Hill Tour in 2005
- Genre: Folk rock
- Label: Limited edition independent record
- Producers: Jeff Cohen and Mike Shimshack

Bethany Joy Lenz chronology
Preincarnate (2002)	Come on Home (2005)	The Starter Kit (2006)

Come on Home is the second studio album released by Bethany Joy Lenz that features five tracks performed by Lenz. Included is a cover titled "Leaving Town Alive" originally performed and written by Pancho's Lament (the alter-ego of New York-based songwriter/producer Jeff Cohen). The four remaining songs included in this album are written by Lenz. The album was sold in limited edition during the OTH Tour in March 2005.

=== Track listing ===
1. "Songs in My Pockets"
2. "Leaving Town Alive" Originally by: Pancho's Lament
3. "Crazy Girls"
4. "Sunday Train"
5. "If You're Missing (Come on Home)" Bonus Track

== The Starter Kit ==
The Starter Kit

Studio album by Bethany Joy Lenz
- Released: Unreleased
- Genre: Folk rock
- Label: Epic Records
- Producer: Ron Aniello

Bethany Joy Lenz chronology
Come On Home	The Starter Kit

The Starter Kit was to make Lenz's Epic Records debut with the release of her full-length album in early 2006, but was dropped due to changes behind the label.

Bethany Joy Lenz released her full length version of "Shiver" for the water in Kenya on her blog.

=== Track listing ===
1. "Songs in My Pockets"
2. "Devil Archerist"
3. "Then Slowly Grows (Come to Me)"
4. "Sunday Storm"
5. "Never Gonna Be (C'mon C'mon)"
6. "Quicksand"
7. "Shiver"
8. "Blue Sky" Originally by: Patty Griffin
9. "Desperate Gown"
10. "Patient Man"

== Mission Bell ==
Mission Bell – EP

EP by Everly
- Released: November 5, 2008
- Genres: Folk, acoustic, bluegrass, pop rock
- Label: Hilasterion Records

Everly chronology
Mission Bell – EP (2008)	Fireside – EP (2009)

Mission Bell – EP – Everly was a girl group composed of One Tree Hill actress Bethany Joy Lenz and her music partner and friend Amber Sweeney who teamed up and released their debut EP entitled "Mission Bell". The EP is an eclectic mix of country, folk and pop rock sounds. The EP features three original tracks, all performed and written by Lenz and Sweeney. "Home is Me – You are Mine" is dedicated to troops overseas. Four 1950s songs were later listed on the EP after they were featured on One Tree Hill in season six.

=== iTunes track listing ===
1. "Home is Me – You are Mine"
2. "Stars"
3. "Little Children"
4. "Mrs. Scott" From One Tree Hill
5. "Scheming Stars" From One Tree Hill
6. "Hotel Café" From One Tree Hill
7. "Karen's Café" From One Tree Hill

=== Hard copy track listing ===
1. "Home is Me – You are Mine"
2. "Stars"
3. "Little Children"
4. "The Sweetest Thing"
5. "Mrs. Scott"
6. "Scheming Stars"
7. "Hotel Café" Original track
8. "Karen's Café" Bonus track

== Fireside ==
Fireside – EP

EP by Everly
- Released: December 17, 2009
- Genres: acoustic, Christmas
- Label: Hilasterion Records

Everly chronology
Mission Bell – EP (2008)	Fireside – EP (2009)	B Tracks: Full Collection (2009)

Fireside – EP is an acoustic Holiday EP released by Everly on iTunes and cdbaby.com.

=== Track listing ===
1. "Sleigh Ride"
2. "Winter Wonderland"
3. "I'll Be Home for Christmas"
4. "Christmas Time is Here"
5. "O Come, O Come Emmanuel"
6. "Have Yourself a Merry Little Christmas/O Holy Night"

== B Tracks ==
B Tracks: Full Collection

EP by Everly
- Released: 2010
- Recorded: 2009
- Genre: Pop rock
- Label: Hilasterion Records

Everly chronology
Fireside – EP (2008)	B Tracks: Full Collection (2010)

B Tracks: Full Collection by Everly. Three volumes were released separately from 2009 to 2010 on cdbaby.com and iTunes. Later all B Tracks merged into one EP.

Vol. 1 – Single

1. "Quicksand"

Released September 14, 2009.

Vol. 2 – Single

1. "Maybe"

Released November 9, 2009.

Vol. 3 – EP

1. "Flying Machine"
2. "Girl in the Moon"
3. "We Belong" Originally by: Pat Benatar

Released January 18, 2010.

== Then Slowly Grows ==
Then Slowly Grows

Studio album by Bethany Joy Lenz
- Released: at Rock the Schools Concert in 2012
- Genre: Folk rock
- Producer: Ron Aniello

Bethany Joy Lenz chronology
The Starter Kit (2006)	Then Slowly Grows (2012)	Your Woman (2013)

Then Slowly Grows is the fourth studio album, (but the third that is released due to the issues that came with her third, "The Starter Kit") released by Bethany Joy Lenz that features nine tracks performed by Lenz. Included on Lenz's fourth studio album are two covers titled "Blue Sky" and "Queen of Wishful Thinking", (King of Wishful Thinking, that was one of her live performances from One Tree Hill Tour in 2005). The seven remaining songs included in this album are written by Lenz. Although "Shiver" is co-written with Ron Aniello and "Anybody Else" is co-written with Ron Aniello and Jason Wade.

The album was released during Rock the Schools Concert and portion of the proceeds benefited the Fender Music Foundation and the victims of Hurricane Sandy. The CDs were damaged and the manufacturer refused to burn new discs and send them out, however a link was created for a digital download purchase.

=== Track listing ===
1. "Devil Archerists"
2. "Anybody Else"
3. "Desperate Gown"
4. "One Man to Love"
5. "Shiver"
6. "Blue Sky" Originally by: Patty Griffin
7. "Queen of Wishful Thinking" Originally by: Go West
8. "Sunday Storm"
9. "Then Slowly Grows"

== Your Woman ==
Your Woman

Studio album by Bethany Joy Lenz
- Released: December 2, 2013
- Genre: Folk Rock
- Label: Victrola Records
- Producer: Jeff Cohen

Bethany Joy Lenz chronology
Then Slowly Grows (2012)	Your Woman (2013)	Get Back to Gold – EP (2014)

Your Woman is the fifth studio album, but kind of also her first full-length album. It's a little bit classic country, a little bit indie rock and a little bit 60's soul pop. All songs are written by Lenz, except "Blue Moon and Fireworks" which is written by Jeff Cohen, Matreca Berg & Kristian Bush. Though these songs are co-written: "Wicked Calamity Jane", "Father Knows Best" and "Your Woman" with Jeff Cohen and "Early Water" with Jeff Cohen & Wes Ramsey.

It was due to be released independently by Lenz on her Official Blog. Before it was released, Lenz sold hard copies to attendees of the One Tree Hill Convention – From Wilmington to Paris on October 19 and 20, 2013.

Lenz later sold 500 autographed first edition copies of the CD on Etsy under the name WishYouWereHereShop as a collector's item. Along with the album, Lenz sent out bonus items to randomly selected buyers. The items included: signed One Tree Hill cast photos, mini autographed holiday photo cards, autographed DVD sets and handwritten thank you cards.

=== Track listing ===
1. "Wicked Calamity Jane"
2. "Father Knows Best"
3. "Please"
4. "I Know" Featuring: Nikhil d'Souza
5. "Early Water"
6. "Your Woman"
7. "Blue Moon and Fireworks"

== Get Back to Gold ==
Get Back to Gold

EP by Bethany Joy Lenz
- Released: December 23, 2014
- Genre: Pop
- Producer: Dru DeCaro

Bethany Joy Lenz chronology
Your Woman (2013)	Get Back to Gold (2014)	It's Christmas (2015)

Get Back to Gold is a four titled track EP, credited as "Joy". The project was a sneak peek for her upcoming album and was funded by a Kickstarter Campaign with backers earning different rewards for supporting the project. A portion of proceeds from the sales had to go directly to Stop the Traffik's Chocolate Campaign.

Three songs were released exclusively on December 18 to all the backers and released on iTunes and Amazon on December 23. The final song "Get Back to Gold" was not completed in time for the release, so it was delayed and added later to the EP. It was released March 29 to the backers and on iTunes and Amazon on April 10, credited as "Bethany Joy Lenz". All songs written by Lenz, Dru DeCaro, and Raycee Jones.

=== Track listing ===
1. "You Belong to Me"
2. "Get Back to Gold"
3. "Call of the Wild"
4. "Start it Up"

== It's Christmas ==
It's Christmas

EP by Bethany Joy Lenz
- Released: December 4, 2015
- Genres: Folk, Holiday

Bethany Joy Lenz chronology
Get Back to Gold (2014)	It's Christmas (2015)

It's Christmas is a two title track EP collaboration between Bethany Joy Lenz, Daniel Shyman & Doo Crowder. "Listen" is written by Lenz herself.

=== Track listing ===
1. "Listen (It's Christmas)"
2. "I'll Be Home for Christmas" Featuring: Doo Crowder

== Snow ==
Snow

EP by Bethany Joy Lenz
- Released: December 4, 2020
- Studio: Stagg Street Studio
- Genres: Folk, Holiday
- Label: Poets Road Records
- Producer: Mike Bundlie

Bethany Joy Lenz chronology
It's Christmas (2015)	Snow (2020)	Snow (2020)

Snow is a six title track EP with four original songs by Bethany Joy Lenz, credited as Bethany Joy and Produced by Mike Bundlie. It was released under Poets Road Records and first announced on Instagram.

=== Track listing ===
1. "Snow"
2. "Jingle Bells"
3. "My Christmas with You" Featuring: Anthony Evans
4. "My Favorite Things"
5. "Rejoice"
6. "Listen" Featuring: Maria Rose

== Singles ==
Year	Title	Album	Notes
1992	"God has a Plan for My Life"	Psalty's Salvation Celebration Soundtrack	
2000	"All Along"	End of August Soundtrack	Featuring: Danny "The Farrow" Anniello
2002	"Ebony and Ivory"; Originally by: Paul McCartney	Undercover Brother Soundtrack	Dubbed over Denise Richards' voice
2005	"When the Stars Go Blue"; Originally by Ryan Adams	One Tree Hill Soundtrack Volume 1	Featuring: Tyler Hilton
2006	"Halo"	Friends with Benefit: Music from the Television Series One Tree Hill, Volume 2	Composed by: Kara Dioguardi & Matthew Gerrard
2007	"Something Familiar" "The Long Way" "Get Your Love"	Ten Inch Hero Soundtrack	
2008	"Feel This"	Feel This – Single	Featuring: Enation
2008	"I Want Something That I Want"	The One Tree Hill Sessions	Featuring: Grace Potter
2009	"Quicksand"	B Tracks: Vol. 1 – Single	As Everly
2009	"Maybe"	B Tracks: Vol. 2 – Single	As Everly
2013	"Please"	Please – Single	Released as "Bette"
2014	"Calamity Jane"	Calamity Jane – Single	Previously Titled "Wicked Calamity Jane"
2017	"(They Long To Be) Close To You"	Po (Original Motion Picture Soundtrack)	
2023	"Strawberries"	Strawberries - Single	

== Televised performances ==
Year	Program	Episode	Track title
2004	One Tree Hill	#1.15 – Suddenly Everything Has Changed	"Elsewhere"; Originally by: Sarah McLachlan
2004	MTV Diary	Diary: One Tree Hill	National anthem
2004	One Tree Hill	#2.07 – Let the Reigns Go Loose	"Let Me Fall"
2005	One Tree Hill	#2.08 – Truth, Bitter Run	"When the Stars Go Blue"; Duet: Tyler Hilton; Originally by: Ryan Adams
2005	WGN Morning News	March 30, 2005	"When the Stars Go Blue"; Duet: Tyler Hilton; Originally by: Ryan Adams
2006	One Tree Hill	#3.15 – Just Watch the Fireworks	"Halo"
2008	One Tree Hill	#5.14 – What Do You Go Home To?	"Leaving Town Alive" Originally by: Pancho's Lament "Let the Fire Start"
2008	One Tree Hill	#5.18 – What Comes After the Blues	"Feel This"; Featuring and originally by: Enation
2008	One Tree Hill	#6.07 – Messin' with the Kid	"I Want Something That I Want"; Duet: Grace Potter
2009	One Tree Hill	#6.11 – We Three (My Echo, My Shadow and Me)	"Karen's Café" Originally: "Hotel Café" "Scheming Star" "Mrs. Scott"
2009	One Tree Hill	#7.01 – 4:30 am (Apparently They Were Travelling Abroad)	"Quicksand"
2009	One Tree Hill	#7.09 – Now You Lift Your Eyes to the Sun	"Maybe"
2009	CW Television	One Tree Hill Session December 18, 2009	"O Holy Night"; Featuring: Amber Sweeney
2010	One Tree Hill	#7.13 – Weeks Go by Like Days	"Flying Machine" "The Girl in the Moon" "We Belong" "Never Gonna Be (C'mon C'mon)"
2010	Life Unexpected	#2.05 – Music Faced	"Stars"
2011	One Tree Hill	#8.22- This is My House, This is My Home	"Walk On the Ocean"
2012	One Tree Hill	#9.13- One Tree Hill	"Blue Sky"
2014	Hallmark Movies & Mysteries	TV movie "The Christmas Secret"	Unknown song title

== Live performances ==
Year	Event	Song title
2004	One Tree Hill's Charity Flag Football Game	National anthem
2004	The 1st Annual One Tree Hill Basketball Charity Game	National anthem
2004	Gavin DeGraw in Concert	"Safe"
2005	The One Tree Hill Tour	"John & Junior" "When the Stars Go Blue" Duet: With Tyler Hilton, originally by Ryan Adams "Foolish Heart" "Songs in My Pockets" "Family Secrets" "Crazy Girls" "Moving Out" Originally by: Billy Joel "Sunday Train" (King)"Queen of Wishful Thinking" Originally by: Go West
2007	The 4th Annual One Tree Hill Basketball Charity Game	National anthem
2008	The 5th Annual One Tree Hill Basketball Charity Game	National anthem
2008	The One Tree Hill USO Show	"The Sweetest Thing" As Everly "Feel This" Originally by: Enation "Home is Me – You Are Mine" As Everly
2009	Tin Pan South Songwriters Festival, as Everly	"The Girl in the Moon" "The Sweetest Thing" "Home is Me – You Are Mine" "The Right Time" "Stars"
2009	Galeotti's Grand Opening, as Everly	"Billie Jean" Originally by: Michael Jackson "Quicksand" "Hold On" Originally by: Wilson Phillips "Won't Back Down" Originally by: Tom Petty "Stars" "Girl in the Moon" "The Right Time" "The Sweetest Thing" "Feel This" Only Enation and Bethany Joy Lenz
2010	Corn Palace Show, as Everly	"Batman" "Crave" "Feel This" Originally by: Enation "Fernando" Originally by: ABBA "Fisherman's Wife – I Will Follow" "Girl in the Moon" "I Try" Originally by: Macy Gray "Let Love" "Maybe" "Mirror" "Not Made of Stone" "Stars" "The Right Time" "The Wreck" "They All Lie" "Wonderland"
2012	Team True Beauty Event, as Everly	"Pray" (Unfinished) "Home is Me – You are Mine" "Batman/Rescue Me mashup" "Rescue Me" is originally by: Fontella Bass "Mirror" "Quicksand"
2012	Nicholas Sparks Celebrity Family Weekend, as Everly	"Can't Kick the Habit" originally by: Spin Doctors "Home is Me – You are Mine" "Batman/Rescue Me mashup" "Rescue Me" is originally by: Fontella Bass "Mirror" "Quicksand" "Crazy Girls" "Songs in My Pockets" "Leap" "Lost Boy" Only Amber Sweeney
2012	CATS for Cats annual event in Los Angeles	"Macavity"
2012	Rock the Schools Concert	"Irresistible" Brief Duet with Wakey Wakey Originally by: Wakey Wakey "Leaving Town Alive" originally by: Jeff Cohen "One Man to Love" "Wicked Calamity Jane" "Please" "Flying Machine" "I Know" Duet: With Wakey Wakey "Quicksand"
2015	"Get Back to Gold" Live Preview	"You Belong to Me" "Start it Up" "Quicksand" "Dance with Me" "Call of the Wild" "Time to Say Goodbye" Originally "Con te Partiro" by Andrea Bocelli "Leaving Town Alive" originally by Jeff Cohen "Get Back to Gold"
2015	The ALS Association Golden West Chapter charity event	"On the Steps of the Palace" from Into the Woods
2015	From Wilmington to Paris Acoustic Concert	"Halo" "Flying Machine" "Get Back to Gold" "Quicksand" "It's Magic" originally by Doris Day "Summertime" originally by Ella Fitzgerald "Scheming Star" "Songs in My Pockets" "Hey Jude" originally by The Beatles "Free"
2016	House Of Blues Concert, as Joy Lenz & The Fellas	"Sunday" "I Love U Too Much" "No shame in Loving" "I Take Care Of This Land" "Natural Woman" originally by Aretha Franklin "Bring It On Home to Me" originally by Sam Cooke "Free" "Please" "Get Back To Gold"
2016	Back To Tree Hill Concert	"When The Stars Go Blue" originally by Ryan Adams "Long Ride Home" originally by Patty Griffin "Halo"
2016	Saint Rocke Concert, as Joy Lenz & the Fellas	"I Love U Too Much" "Lie Lie Lie" originally by Doo Crowder "Long Ride Home" originally by Patty Griffin "Songs in My Pockets" "The One Thing (Everyone Wants)" "Impossible" originally by Doo Crowder "Jockey Full of Bourbon" originally by Tom Waits "Sunday" "Desperate Gown" "Bring It Home To Me" originally by Sam Cooke "Free" "Talk" "Eulogy" "Wrestle"
2016	Joy Lenz & her Firepit Band 2016 Tour; Kenmore, WA; Agoura Hills, CA; Wilmington, NC; Vienna, VA; Sellersville, PA; Pawling, NY; New York City, NY; Fall River, MA	"I Love U Too Much" "Lie Lie Lie" originally by Doo Crowder "Long Ride Home" originally by Patty Griffin "Get Back To Gold" "The One Thing (Everyone Wants)" "Impossible" originally by Doo Crowder "Jockey Full of Bourbon" originally by Tom Waits "Sunday" "Desperate Gown" "Bring It Home To Me" originally by Sam Cooke "Free" "Talk" "Eulogy" "Dance With Me" "Will You Still Love Me Tomorrow" originally by The Shirelles "Jaroline" originally by Doo Crowder "La Vie En Rose" originally by Edith Piaf

== Miscellaneous songs ==
- "The Loneliness is Better Near Now" Was released on her old music site back in 2005, April 13
- "One More Thing" Released by Bethany herself on her old music site back in 2005, April 13
- "Ophelia" Released on September 14, 2005, as she was stuck inside waiting out Hurricane Ophelia
- "Troublesome Tongue" An exclusive track from "The Notebook" Musical | Released November 5, 2010, on mymusicstream, by Bethany herself as a thank you reward to her fans for supporting the organization 'Love 146' which raises awareness on child sex trafficking
- "Street Where You Live" Originally From: 1956 Broadway Musical "My Fair Lady" | An Easter treat for her fans on her blog – April 24, 2011
- "It Happens" Released on August 5, 2011 | Video Karaoke of Sugarland's "It Happens" for HelloGiggles
- "It's Magic" Released on September 29, 2011, on SoundCloud
- "Someone to Watch Over Me" Released on April 8, 2012, on WhoSay | Video Karaoke for her Novel, Diamond Gothic
- "Lullaby" Released on June 21, 2012, on WhoSay | "Just a little lullaby for the night drifters"
- "Sympathy" Released in 2015 on SoundCloud
- "Eulogy" Released in 2016 on SoundCloud, but not available anymore
- "Little Children" Released in 2016 on SoundCloud
- "Ghost Stories" Released on her Twitter account (now deleted account) on February 27, 2018, at 8:54 PM
- "Drama Queens" Released in 2021 to promote Drama Queens podcast alongside Sophia Bush and Hilarie Burton
