= Preincarnate =

Preincarnate may refer to:

- Pre-existence of Christ
- Preincarnate (album), 2002 album by Bethany Joy Lenz
- Preincarnate (novel), 2010 novella by Shaun Micallef
