= Drama Queens (podcast) =

One Tree Hill rewatch podcast

- Genre: Rewatch
- Language: English

Cast and voices
- Hosted by: Sophia Bush; Hilarie Burton Morgan; Bethany Joy Lenz; Robert Buckley

Music
- Opening theme: "Drama Queens" by Bethany Joy Lenz

Publication
- No. of episodes: 173
- Original release: June 21, 2021
- Provider: iHeartRadio
- Updates: Weekly

Related
- Related shows: One Tree Hill

Drama Queens is a rewatch podcast of the popular teen drama of the 2000s, One Tree Hill, hosted by the show's three female leads Sophia Bush, Hilarie Burton Morgan and Bethany Joy Lenz. Robert Buckley joined the show in July 2024. The show produced by iHeartRadio launched on June 21, 2021. The podcast follows the series' order and consists of the ladies discussing the episodes with their new adult perspectives, along with discussing behind-the-scenes moments, positive or negative, as well as sharing aspects of their personal lives. The podcast aims to cover all nine seasons of the show, having one, sometimes two, podcast episodes for every One Tree Hill episode.

== Premise ==
The actresses describe the podcast as a healing experience, where they get to discuss a show that is very impactful for them on their own terms while also using it to speak out about the shared experience of mistreatment they've faced while shooting, by the show's creator Mark Schwahn, They even refer to him as Voldemort. They view it as reclaiming their show and their experiences. They share specific moments that showcase the bullying and sexual misconduct they faced, calling out the toxic workplace they were in, all the while uplifting and empowering each other, centring their friendship and growth as a core theme.

== Production ==
=== Conception ===
The idea came to them during the pandemic. Sophia Bush, who already had a positive experience in making a podcast, with the one she started pre-covid, titled Work In Progress, was doing regular three-way FaceTime calls with her now co-hosts. They all noticed that many fans were re-watching and discussing the show during this worldwide event, and this all led to the suggestion of creating the podcast, where together, they could talk about their hit show with total creative freedom and bring their fans along.

iHeartRadio proceeded to produce the show while Bush, Burton-Morgan and Lenz were all made executive producers. Their respective professional careers make it so that they often are not together therefore, they shoot the episodes from different places in the world while on Zoom.

=== Theme song ===
Each podcast episode starts with a theme song titled "Drama Queens", that was written and performed by Lenz.

== Tour ==
In August 2022, they announced that they were taking the Drama Queens podcast on tour in October, to do live episodes with special guests in front of an audience. From the 15th to the 19th, they toured four different U.S cities, Boston, New York, Washington and Philadelphia. Tickets were sold quickly and the originally planned four shows turned into seven shows, they were added and took place at a later time of day. The special guests were all One Tree Hill alums: Paul Johansson, Torrey DeVitto, Tyler Hilton, Robert Buckley, Barbara Alyn Woods, Daphne Zuniga, Matt Barr, Lee Norris, Antwon Tanner and Switchfoot. The seven shows that took place were all recorded and later posted online as podcast episodes.

== Format ==
=== Main episodes ===
Most of the podcast's episode center around a specific episode of One Tree Hill. Those podcast episodes follow the chronological release order of the show. They re-watch the show off camera and then discuss its content on the pod, they share their thoughts about the storylines and some behind the scenes insight. Each of those episodes feature a title with a pop-culture reference and or an allusion to the episode itself, along with the episode number. They often time have guests come on that also acted in the show, usually when they are focusing on an episode that heavily involves the guest's character. The actors frequently reminisce about their common past and have heartfelt reunions The only time the featured guest wasn't an actor was when they brought in gun-safety political activist Shannon Watts, when they rewatched season 3 episode 16 of the series that featured a school shooting and suicide storyline.

=== One Tree Thrill ===
There are several episodes titled One Three Thrill, they are shorter episodes that alternate between the main episodes. The episodes consists of fan interactions, the three actresses answering questions from listeners.

=== 23 Questions with ===
In August 2023, they started doing the 23 questions with episodes, where they have a special guest, an actor from the show, and ask them 23 questions. The specific number of questions is in reference to the basketball jersey number of one of the male leads of One Tree Hill, 23. Only a few actor have participated in this : Torrey DeVitto, Daneel Ackles, Antwon Tanner, Barbara Alyn Woods, Kate Voegele, Stephen Colletti, Robbie Jones and Tyler Hilton.

== Episodes ==
No.	Title	Featured Guest	Run Time	Original Release date
1	Someday is Today	None	54:00	June 21, 2021
2	Take Me to the Pilot • EP101	None	1:15:00	June 28, 2021
3	Kissing is Gross • EP102	None	1:07:00	July 5, 2021
4	Backseats and Basketballs with Lee Norris (Marvin "Mouth" McFadden)• EP103	Lee Norris	1:04:00	July 12, 2021
5	Never Have I Ever • EP104	None	56:00	July 19, 2021
6	Into the Wood and Weed Wackers (Barbara Alyn Woods as Deb Scott) • EP105	Barbara Alyn Woods	1:33:00	July 26, 2021
7	The Ultimate Mix-Tape • EP106	None	1:01:00	August 2, 2021
8	Fairy Tales & Lamps • EP107	None	1:02:00	August 9, 2021
9	Dare You To Move • EP108	None	52:00	August 16, 2021
10	Lucas' Tattoo • EP109	None	1:09:00	August 23, 2021
11	We Got Skills with Antwon Tanner • Ep110	Antwon Tanner	1:02:00	August 30, 2021
12	Turtlenecks • EP111	None	1:02:00	September 6, 2021
13	A Royal Mess • EP112	None	59:00	September 13, 2021
14	The Crockpot • EP113	None	51:00	September 20, 2021
15	Dan the Man • EP114	Paul Johansson	1:00:00	September 27, 2021
16	Light, Camera, Cry on Cue! • EP115	None	1:04:00	October 4, 2021
17	This One's Cursed • EP116	None	53:00	October 11, 2021
18	Sparkle Pits • EP117	None	1:05:00	October 18, 2021
19	Give Me Moira • EP118	Moira Kelly	1:10:00	October 25, 2021
20	Bedroom Talks • EP119	None	1:02:00	November 1, 2021
21	Oh Nicki, You're so Fine! (with Emmanuelle Vaugier) • EP120	Emmanuelle Vaugier	58:00	November 8, 2021
22	Hot Topic • EP121	None	59:00	November 15, 2021
23	Season One Finale • EP122	None	1:06:00	November 29, 2021
24	Playing with Fire • EP201	None	51:00	December 6, 2021
25	Tric or Treat • EP202	None	1:01:00	December 13, 2021
26	Blurred Lines • EP203	Bevin Prince	1:10:00	December 20, 2021
27	Piano Woman • EP204	None	49:00	December 27, 2021
28	One Tree Thrill	None	31:00	December 31, 2021
29	Truth or Dare • EP205	None	52:00	January 3, 2022
30	The Crown Jules with Maria Menounos • EP206	Maria Menounos	58:00	January 10, 2022
31	Croissants are meant to be Eaten • EP207	None	49:00	January 17, 2022
32	Hot for Teacher with Kieren Hutchison (aka Andy) • EP208	Kieren Hutchison	57:00	January 24, 2022
33	One Tree Thrill (Part 2)	None	22:00	January 28, 2022
34	A Formal Affair • EP209	None	1:02:00	January 31, 2022
35	Coming into Our Power • EP210	None	43:00	February 7, 2022
36	Checking into the Hilton, with Tyler Hilton • EP210 (part 2)	Tyler Hilton	47:00	February 14, 2022
37	Smoke and Mirrors • EP211	None	55:00	February 21, 2022
38	One Tree Thrill (Part 3)	None	13:00	February 25, 2022
39	The Perfect Myth • EP212	None	1:00:00	February 28, 2022
40	Aim for the stars!! • EP213	None	1:00:00	March 7, 2022
41	Mouth to Moth with Katherine Bailess (aka Erica Marsh) • EP214	Katherine Bailess	1:01:00	March 12, 2022
42	Time After Time • EP215	None	1:00:00	March 21, 2022
43	One Tree Thrill (Part 4)	None	19:00	March 25, 2022
44	This Wedding CRASHED, with Craig Sheffer • EP216	Craig Sheffer	50:00	March 28, 2022
45	This Wedding CRASHED, with Craig Sheffer • EP216 (Part 2)	Craig Sheffer	37:00	April 4, 2022
46	Drama Queens Live || with Bryan Greenberg	Bryan Greenberg; Skye P. Marshall	1:00:00	April 8, 2022
47	I hate Mondays • EP217	None	55:00	April 11, 2022
48	That Did Not Age Well • EP218	None	1:04:00	April 18, 2022
49	Magic Mike w/Michael Trucco aka Uncle Cooper • EP219	Michael Trucco	1:09:00	April 25, 2022
50	One Tree Thrill (Part 5)	None	46:00	April 29, 2022
51	Chchchanges... • EP220	None	53:00	May 2, 2022
52	You Brett Your Life w/Brett Claywell aka Tim Smith • EP221	Brett Claywell	1:10:00	May 9, 2022
53	Drama King w/Paul Johansson • EP222	Paul Johansson	59:00	May 16, 2022
54	Taylor-Made w/Lindsey McKeon • EP223	Lindsey McKeon	58:00	May 23, 2022
55	One Tree Thrill (Part 6)	None	19:00	May 27, 2022
56	Unbreak My Heart • EP301	None	1:04:00	May 30, 2022
57	Our Favorite Things • EP302	None	1:00:00	June 6, 2022
58	Haley's Journey • EP303	None	1:03:00	June 13, 2022
59	I'm Batman • EP304	None	56:00	June 20, 2022
60	Having a Brawl • EP305	None	56:00	June 27, 2022
61	One Tree Thrill (Part 7)	None	22:00	June 30, 2022
62	Happy 4 July! (2 mins)	None	2:00	July 4, 2022
63	Passing Notes w/Danneel Ackles (Rachel Gatina) • EP306	Danneel Ackles	59:00	July 11, 2022
64	Praying for Rain • EP 307	None	1:31:00	July 18, 2022
65	Say the Thing!! • EP308	None	1:00:00	July 25, 2022
66	One Tree Thrill (Part 8)	None	21:00	July 29, 2022
67	Clothes Over Bros • EP309	None	59:00	August 1, 2022
68	Twin Peaked w/Sheryl Lee • EP310	Sheryl Lee	1:10:00	August 8, 2022
69	It's a Trap! • EP311	None	1:19:00	August 15, 2022
70	A Walk to Remember • EP312	None	1:07:00	August 22, 2022
71	One Tree Thrill (Part 9)	None	18:00	August 26, 2022
72	I'm Not Crying, We're Crying • EP 313	None	1:05:00	August 29, 2022
73	Going Rogue • EP314	Anna Lotto	50:00	September 5, 2022
74	The Future is Now • EP315	None	1:08:00	September 12, 2022
75	Dial 988 • EP316 w/Colin Fickes	Colin Fickes	1:08:00	September 19, 2022
76	Dial 988 • EP316 (Part Two/Shannon Watts)	Shannon Watts	36:00	September 23, 2022
77	Feeling Feelings • EP317	None	58:00	September 26, 2022
78	One Tree Thrill (Part 10)	None	20:00	September 30, 2022
79	Hindsight is 20-22 • EP318	None	52:00	October 3, 2022
80	The Fall Out • EP319	None	1:01:00	October 10, 2022
81	Vegas, Baby • EP320	None	58:00	October 17, 2022
82	Here We Go Again, Again • EP321	None	47:00	October 24, 2022
83	LIVE IN BOSTON feat. Tyler Hilton and Robert Buckley	Tyler Hilton; Robert Buckley	1:01:00	October 28, 2022
84	Sunset, Before Sunrise • EP322	None	53:00	October 31, 2022
85	LIVE IN NYC feat.Barbara Alyn Woods & Daphne Zuniga	Barbara Alyn Woods; Daphne Zuniga	57:00	November 4, 2022
86	Anatomy of a Relationship • EP401	None	1:07:00	November 7, 2022
87	LIVE IN PHILLY! feat. Paul Johansson & Torrey DeVitto	Paul Johansson & Torrey DeVitto	1:18:00	November 11, 2022
88	We've Got Skills • EP402	None	59:00	November 14, 2022
89	LIVE IN BOSTON (Part 2) feat.Matt Barr, Tyler Hilton and Robert Buckley	Matt Barr; Tyler Hilton; Robert Buckley	1:00:00	November 18, 2022
90	Good News/Bad News • EP 403	None	59:00	November 21, 2022
91	LIVE IN WASHINGTON DC feat. Lee Noris, Antwon Tanner and SwitchFoot	Lee Noris; Antwon Tanner; SwitchFoot	1:14:00	November 25, 2022
92	It's a Fiasco • EP404	None	1:08:00	November 28, 2022
93	LIVE IN NYC (Part 2) feat. Tyler Hilton and Robert Buckley	Tyler Hilton; Robert Buckley	58:00	December 2, 2022
94	Scream-ish • EP405	None	1:00:00	December 5, 2022
95	LIVE IN PHILLY! (Part 2) feat. Paul Johansson & Torrey DeVitto	Paul Johansson & Torrey DeVitto	22:00	December 9, 2022
96	Look Me in the Eyeliner, EP406	None	1:05:00	December 12, 2022
97	Scripted Reality • EP407	None	51:00	December 19, 2022
98	One Tree Thrill (Part 11)	None	35:00	December 23, 2022
99	'Tis the Season!	None	8:00	December 26, 2022
100	Will the Real Derek Please Stand Up • EP408 w/Ernest Waddell	Ernest Waddell	58:00	January 3, 2023
101	And the Award Goes to... • EP409	None	1:00:00	January 9, 2023
102	Making Amends • EP410	None	1:00:00	January 16, 2023
103	A Lot to Unpack • EP411	None	1:02:00	January 23, 2023
104	One Tree Thrill (Part 12)	None	22:00	January 27, 2023
105	Clean Teens with Elisabeth Harnois • EP412	Elisabeth Harnois	1:14:00	January 30, 2023
106	What's Not to Love? • EP413	None	56:00	February 6, 2023
107	Hindsight is 20-23 • EP414	None	1:04:00	February 13, 2023
108	Missing Plot • EP415	None	43:00	February 20, 2023
109	One Tree Thrill (Part 13)	None	20:00	February 24, 2023
110	Proms & Villains • EP416 (Part one) with Matt Barr	Matt Barr	47:00	February 27, 2023
111	Proms & Villains • EP416 (Part two)	None	38:00	March 6, 2023
112	Honey Grove • EP417	None	57:00	March 15, 2023
113	Number 23 • EP418 Part 1 with James Lafferty	James Lafferty	45:00	March 20, 2023
114	Number 23 • EP418 Part 2 with James Lafferty	James Lafferty	55:00	March 27, 2023
115	One Tree Thrill (Part 14)	None	19:00	March 31, 2023
116	Heartstrings • EP419	None	58:00	April 3, 2023
117	The Class of 2007 • EP420	None	1:03:00	April 10, 2023
118	Look at us Now • EP421 with Danneel Ackles	Danneel Ackles	1:19:00	April 17, 2023
119	The Time Jump • EP501	None	1:26:00	April 24, 2023
120	One Tree Thrill (Part 15)	None	20:00	April 28, 2023
121	It Feels so Good • EP502	None	1:22:00	May 1, 2023
122	First Steps • EP503	None	1:01:00	May 8, 2023
123	Victoria's Secrets With Daphne Zuniga	Daphne Zuniga	47:00	May 15, 2023
124	Hi Mrs. Davis! • EP504 with Daphne Zuniga	Daphne Zuniga	1:10:00	May 22, 2023
125	Aaaand Acrion! • EP505	Liz Friedlander	1:06:00	May 29, 2023
126	One Tree Thrill (Part 16)	None	27:00	June 2, 2023
127	The Nanny Carrie Diaries • EP506	None	1:07:00	June 5, 2023
128	A True Night Out • EP507	None	1:05:00	June 12, 2023
129	If the Shoe Fits • EP508	None	59:00	June 19, 2023
130	The Truth Behind it All with Michaela McManus	Michaela McManus	47:00	June 26, 2023
131	One Tree Thrill (Part 17)	None	16:00	July 1, 2023
132	Happy Fourth of July! (4 min)	None	4:00	July 3, 2023
133	Even More • Ep509 with Michaela McManus	Michaela McManus	1:10:00	July 10, 2023
134	Striking a Balance	None	37:00	July 17, 2023
135	The Great Betrayal • EP510	None	1:03:00	July 24, 2023
136	One Tree Thrill (Part 18)	None	20:00	July 28, 2023
137	Thanks for the Memories • EP511	None	1:04:00	July 31, 2023
138	Dreaming of 100 • EP512	None	1:01:00	August 7, 2023
139	23 Questions with Torrey DeVitto	Torrey DeVitto	49:00	August 14, 2023
140	For Better and For Worse • EP513	None	53:00	August 21, 2023
141	23 Questions with Antwon Tanner	Antwon Tanner	1:10:00	August 28, 2023
142	One Tree Thrill (Part 19)	None	31:00	September 1, 2023
143	The Hollywood Dilemma • EP514	None	1:01:00	September 4, 2023
144	23 Questions with Kate Voegele	Kate Voegele	1:05:00	September 11, 2023
145	Bring on the Tears • EP515	None	56:00	September 18, 2023
146	23 Questions with Barbara Alyn Woods	Barbara Alyn Woods	51:00	September 24, 2023
147	One Tree Thrill (Part 20)	None	25:00	September 29, 2023
148	All Eyes On Dan • EP516	None	57:00	October 2, 2023
149	23 Questions with Tyler Hilton	Tyler Hilton	1:07:00	October 9, 2023
150	Stuck in A Moment • EP517	None	1:02:00	October 16, 2023
151	23 Questions with Danneel Ackles	Danneel Ackles	56:00	October 23, 2023
152	One Tree Thrill (Part 21)	None	32:00	October 27, 2023
153	A Day to Remember • EP518	None	1:05:00	October 30, 2023
154	23 Questions with Stephen Colletti	Stephen Colletti	1:03:00	November 6, 2023
155	23 Questions with Robbie Jones	Robbie Jones	1:09:00	November 13, 2023
156	The Baggage Has To Match • EP601	None	1:04:00	November 20, 2023
157	Tower of Terror • EP602	None	1:00:00	November 27, 2023
158	One Tree Thrill (Part 22)	None	24:00	December 1, 2023
159	Quentin • EP603 with Robbie Jones	Robbie Jones	1:03:00	December 4, 2023
160	Sitting in Grief • EP604	None	1:19:00	December 10, 2023
161	Ashley Rickards	Ashley Rickards	46:00	December 18, 2023
162	One Tree Thrill (Part 23)	None	29:00	December 22, 2023
163	A Very Drama Queen Holiday	None	15:00	December 25, 2023
164	The Dream Theme • EP605 with Ashley Rickards	Ashley Rickards	1:13:00	January 1, 2024
165	Torrey DeVito	Torrey DeVito	1:11:00	January 8, 2024
166	Oh The Things You Don't Know • EP606	None	1:11:00	January 15, 2024
167	The Next Generation • EP607	None	1:12:00	January 22, 2024
168	One Tree Thrill (Part 24)	None	27:00	January 26, 2024
169	When Facts Meet Fiction • EP608	None	1:14:00	January 29, 2024
170	Snack Break! • EP609 with Austin Nichols	Austin Nichols	1:15:00	February 5, 2024
171	The Crown Julian (with Austin Nichols)	Austin Nichols	41:00	February 12, 2024
172	Sensory Overload • EP610	None	1:10:00	February 19, 2024
173	Phil Rosenthal	Phil Rosenthal	01:03:00	February 20, 2024
174	I Need......Love? • EP611	None	1:13:00	February 24, 2024
175	In Case You Missed It	Bryan Greenberg	01:13:00	February 28, 2024
176	One Tree Thrill (Part 25)	None	19:00	February 29, 2024
177	Kelsey Asbille	Kelsey Asbille	34:00	March 3, 2024
178	More Brooch • EP612	Kelsey Asbille	58:00	March 10, 2024
179	Work in Progress: Jenny Cavnar	Jenny Cavnar	50:00	March 13, 2024
180	The Truth Shall Set Us Free • EP613	None	59:00	March 17, 2024
181	Work in Progress: Joy-Ann Reid	Joy-Ann Reid	59:00	March 20, 2024
182	Karaoke Night • EP614	None	53:00	March 24, 2024
183	Work In Progress: Torrey DeVitto	Torrey DiVitto	50:00	March 27, 2024
184	One Tree Thrill (Part 26)	None	20:00	March 29, 2024
185	Kate Voegele	Kate Voegle	58:00	March 31, 2024
186	Work in Progress: Dylan Mulvaney	Dylan Mulvaney	01:08:00	April 3, 2024
187	The Truth of It All • EP615	Kate Voegele	55:00	April 7, 2024
188	Work In Progress: Ariana DeBose	Ariana DeBose	58:00	April 10, 2024
189	And...Action • EP616	None	58:00	April 14, 2024
190	Work in Progress: Linsey Davis	Linsey Davis	39:00	April 17, 2024
191	Trauma of the Best King • EP617	None	1:05:00	April 21, 2024
192	Work In Progress: Jamie-Lynn Sigler	Jamie-Lynn Sigler	53:00	April 24, 2024
193	One Tree Thrill (Part 27)	None	0:33:00	April 25, 2024
194	The Heart in The Lunchbox • EP618	None	51:00	April 28, 2024
195	Work In Progress: Alisyn Camerota	Alisyn Camerota	54:00	May 1, 2024
196	Take 2! • EP619	Paul Johansson	01:17:00	May 5, 2024
197	Work In Progress: Ben McKenzie	Ben McKenzie	01:13:00	May 8, 2024
198	Fans & Stans • EP620	None	57:00	May 12, 2024
199	Work In Progress: In Case You Missed It: Jane Fonds	Jane Fonda	01:02:00	May 15, 2024
200	This Is What They Call Closure • EP621	None	58:00	May 19, 2024
201	Work In Progress: In Case You Missed It: Jesse Tyler Ferguson	Jesse Tyler Ferguson	55:00	May 22, 2024
202	Cullen Moss	Cullen Moss	29:00	May 26, 2024
203	Work In Progress: In Case You Missed It: Melissa Etheridge	Melissa Etheridge	01:02:00	May 29, 2024
204	One Tree Thrill (Part 28)	None	27:00	May 30, 2024
205	Tears and Junk • EP622	Cullen Moss	60:00	June 2, 2024
206	Work in Progress Q&A	None	36:00	June 5, 2024
207	Hi Friend • EP623	None	01:03:00	June 9, 2024
208	Work in Progress: Chris Colfer	Chris Colfer	50:00	June 12, 2024
209	Everyone's Happiness • EP624 (Part 1)	None	48:00	June 16, 2024
210	Everyone's Happiness • EP624 (Part 2)	None	36:00	June 23, 2024
211	Work in Progress: Tig Notaro and Stephanie Allynne	Tig Notaro and Stephanie Allynne	55:00	June 26, 2024
212	One Tree Thrill (Part 29)	None	25:00	June 27, 2024
213	Happy Birthday (to us!)	None	3:00	June 30, 2024
214	There's a New Drama Queen in Town...	None	53:00	July 7, 2024
215	Work in Progress: Amit Rahav	Amit Rahav	39:00	July 10, 2024
216	Please Forgive Me • EP701	None	1:10:00	July 14, 2024
217	Work in Progress: Nico Tortorella	Nico Tortorella	57:00	July 17, 2024
218	Through the Looking Glass • EP702	None	01:08:00	July 21, 2024
219	Work in Progress: Natalie Portman	Natalie Portman	45:00	July 24, 2024
220	One Tree Thrill (Part 30)	None	20:00	July 25, 2024
221	Competitive Nature • EP703	None	59:00	July 28, 2024
222	The Return of Daphne • EP704	Daphne Zuniga	1:09:00	August 4, 2024
223	Work in Progress: Katie Couric	Katie Couric	01:09:00	August 7, 2024
224	Be Careful Who You Stereotype • EP705	None	01:04:00	August 11, 2024
225	Work in Progress: Symone Sanders-Townsend	Symone Sanders-Townsend	01:06:00	August 14, 2024
226	Jana Kramer	Jana Kramer	36:00	August 18, 2024
227	Work in Progress: Kevin McHale	Kevin McHale	01:27:00	August 21, 2024
288	Remember When We Lived Together • EP706	Jana Kramer	39:00	August 25, 2024
289	Work in Progress: Maren Morris	Maren Morris	01:14:00	August 28, 2024
290	One Tree Thrill (Part 31)	None	15:000	August 29, 2024
291	Crying It Out • EP707	None	01:03:00	September 1, 2024
292	Work in Progress: Nancy Pelosi	Nancy Pelosi	58:00	September 4, 2024
293	All About The Boys • EP708	None	50:00	September 8, 2024
294	Work in Progress: Karine Jean-Pierre	Karine Jean-Pierre	01:02:00	September 11, 2024
295	And, We're Rolling • EP709	None	01:01:00	September 15, 2024
296	Work in Progress: Morgan Wade	Morgan Wade	59:00	September 18, 2024
297	One Tree Thrill (Part 32)	None	28:00	September 19, 2024
298	All About Dan • EP710	None	01:02:00	September 22, 2024
299	Work in Progress: Uzo Aduba	Uzo Aduba	58:00	September 25, 2024
300	One Tree Thrill (Part 33)	None	33:00	September 25, 2024
301	The Best of Drama Queens	None	31:00	September 28, 2024
302	Getting Bagels • EP711	None	01:00:00	September 30, 2024
