= Songs in My Pockets =

"Songs in My Pocket"

Single by Bethany Joy Galeotti

from the album Come On Home
- Released: 2005, 2006
- Recorded: 2005
- Genre: Folk rock
- Length: 3:21
- Label: Epic, Limited Edition Independent Records
- Songwriter(s): Bethany Joy Galeotti
- Producer(s): Ron Aniello, Gary G.

"Songs in My Pocket" is a song written and performed by Bethany Joy Galeotti. This song was originally released on Galeotti's second studio album Come On Home in 2005 and was to be re-released on her debut album The Starter Kit (2006).

Bethany Joy Galeotti and costar Tyler Hilton joined The Wreckers (Michelle Branch and Jessica Harp) for a 25-city North American "One Tree Hill" tour that started February 28 in Vancouver. The jaunt also featured Gavin DeGraw on select dates. "

While on tour, Galeotti performed some of her original songs from her second independent record including the song "Songs in My Pockets". This song in particular was a prominent feature in Galeotti's opening performances on the One Tree Hill tour and because of its popularity among fans and strong meaning to Galeotti it was to be re-released on her debut album. Consequently, a video was made for this track.

== Debut album ==
In the Winter/Spring 2006 issue of TeenProm Galeotti stated that her Come On Home track, "Songs in My Pocket" was to be re-released on her debut album.

Home is so important to this talented actress/singer that it's the theme of her tune "Songs in My Pocket", which will be featured on her Epic Records debut CD. "I think it's probably going to be the first track on the album and it's about finding home. That's been a huge theme in my life for the past couple of years, so every time I hear that song, it'll always kind of be like, 'Aw, that's my baby."

== The video ==
The video was produced by Gary Gimelfarb and directed by Alex Merkin. During her time off tour, Galeotti filmed the video at Coney Island Beach and Astroland in Brooklyn, New York.

"I still liked the idea of doing a very homemade feeling video where Joy could be Joy. Something that was real, like her music, and not overly glossy or lacking the human element and soul that you see missing in many music videos today. Joy's music is heartfelt and I wanted the video to mirror that. Also she has the kind of spirit and glow that you don't need hundreds of thousands of dollars to manufacture, nor could you manufacture for any amount of money. I loved the idea of stripping away all the elements and having Joy just do her thing." - Alex Merkin on the making of Galeotti's video

Numerous shots included in the video were intended to be reminiscent of someone with a camera taking pictures of themselves at a beautiful locatiomn-the kind of Polaroid or snapshot picture people take when they travel. This filming technique helped add to the nostalgic quality-a prevalent theme in Galeotti's music.

Epic Records does not own the video despite the fact that this song was to be re-released on Bethany Joy Galeotti's debut album. The video was shot before she officially signed with them. When Merkin dealt with Epic Records, in terms of contract negotiations (for video footage and additional filming) he made sure not to sign over the rights to the video.
