= Hilarie Burton =

American actress (born 1982)

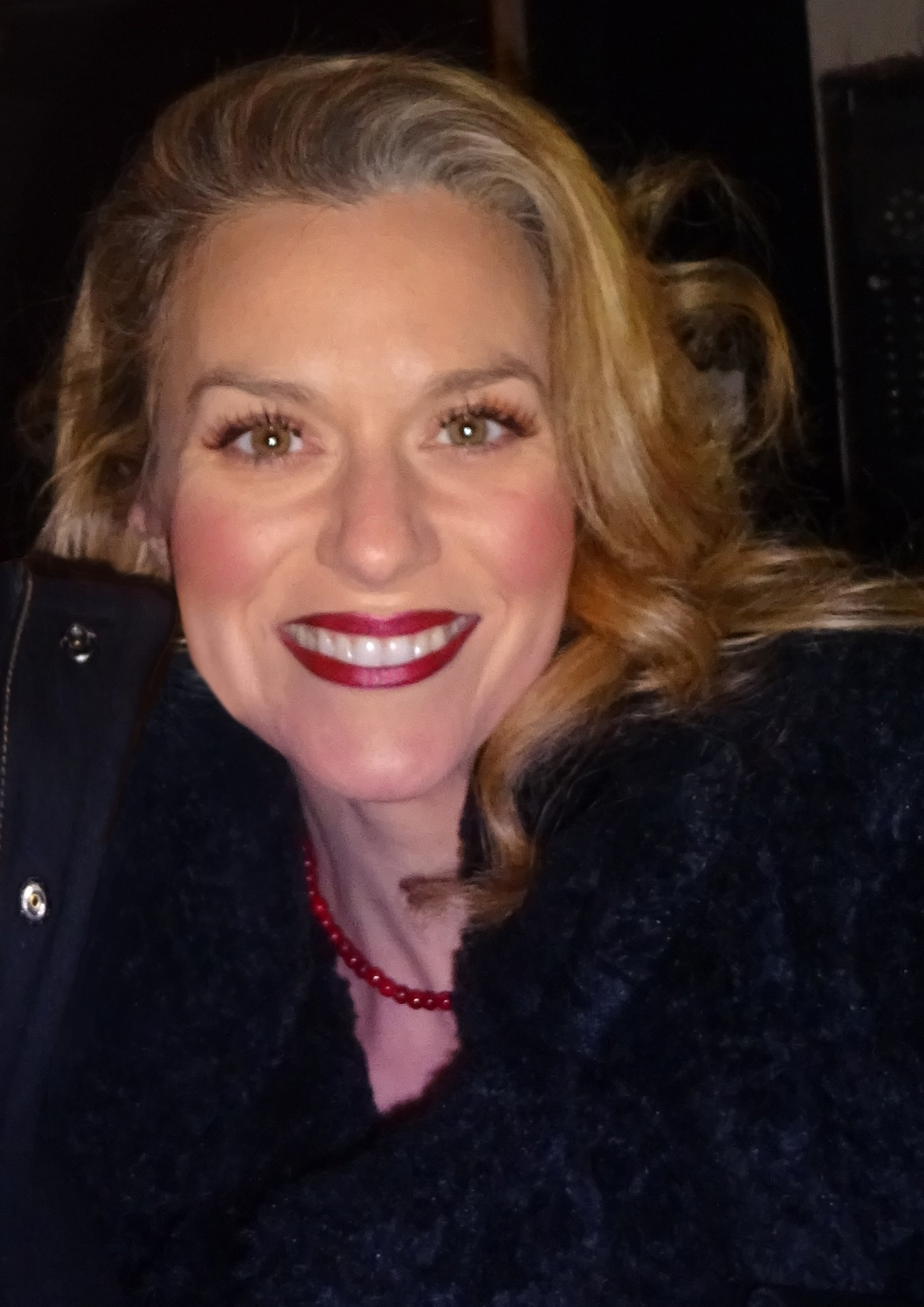
- Burton in 2016
- Born: Hilarie Ros Burton; July 1, 1982 (age 44); Sterling, Virginia, U.S.
- Other name: Hilarie Burton Morgan
- Education: Fordham University
- Occupations: Actress; TV host
- Years active: 1997–present
- Spouse: Jeffrey Dean Morgan (m. 2019)
- Children: 2

Hilarie Ros Burton (born July 1, 1982), also known as Hilarie Burton Morgan, is an American actress. A former host of MTV's Total Request Live, she portrayed Peyton Sawyer on The WB/The CW drama One Tree Hill for six seasons (2003–2009). Post One Tree Hill, Burton starred in Our Very Own, Solstice, and The List. She has also had supporting or recurring roles in television series, including her role as Sara Ellis on White Collar (2010–2013), Dr. Lauren Boswell on the ABC medical drama Grey's Anatomy (2013), Molly Dawes on the ABC drama series Forever (2014), and Karen Palmer on the Fox television series Lethal Weapon (2016). Burton was a co-host on the Drama Queens podcast along with her former One Tree Hill co-stars Sophia Bush and Bethany Joy Lenz until the summer of 2024.

== Early life ==
Hilarie Ros Burton was born on July 1, 1982, in Sterling, Virginia. Her father, James William "Bill" Burton, is a veteran of the U.S. Army, and her mother, Lisa Kay (née Blankers), is a real estate agent of Dutch descent from Minnesota. The eldest of four children, Burton has three brothers. In 2000, she graduated from Park View High School, where she was student council treasurer her sophomore year, vice-president her junior year, and captain of the cheerleading squad, student council president, and homecoming queen her senior year. Burton attended New York University and Fordham University, graduating in 2004.

== Career ==
=== Media personality ===
Burton's first big break came when working as a VJ for MTV's Total Request Live (TRL). She was supposed to be a guest commentator for one segment, but producers decided to offer her a permanent job. Burton went on to present at the 2000 MTV Video Music Awards and MTV's Iced Out New Year's Eve. Burton went on to portray herself on The WB drama series Dawson's Creek in 2002, which marked her scripted television series acting debut.

In October 2017, when news of the Harvey Weinstein sexual abuse cases broke, Burton retweeted a 2003 video clip from TRL Uncensored in which Ben Affleck squeezed her breast on air. This was in response to a fan tweet that quipped, "[Affleck] also grabbed Hilarie Burton-Morgan's breasts on TRL once. Everyone forgot though." Burton replied, "I didn't forget [about it] ... I was a kid." Affleck, who'd just publicly criticized Harvey Weinstein, subsequently responded on Twitter to apologize to Burton. When asked about the incident a month later on The Late Show with Stephen Colbert, Affleck said, "I don't remember it, but I absolutely apologize for it. I certainly don't think she's lying or making it up.'"

In 2021, Burton started a podcast with One Tree Hill co-stars Sophia Bush and Bethany Joy Lenz titled Drama Queens.

=== Acting and producing ===
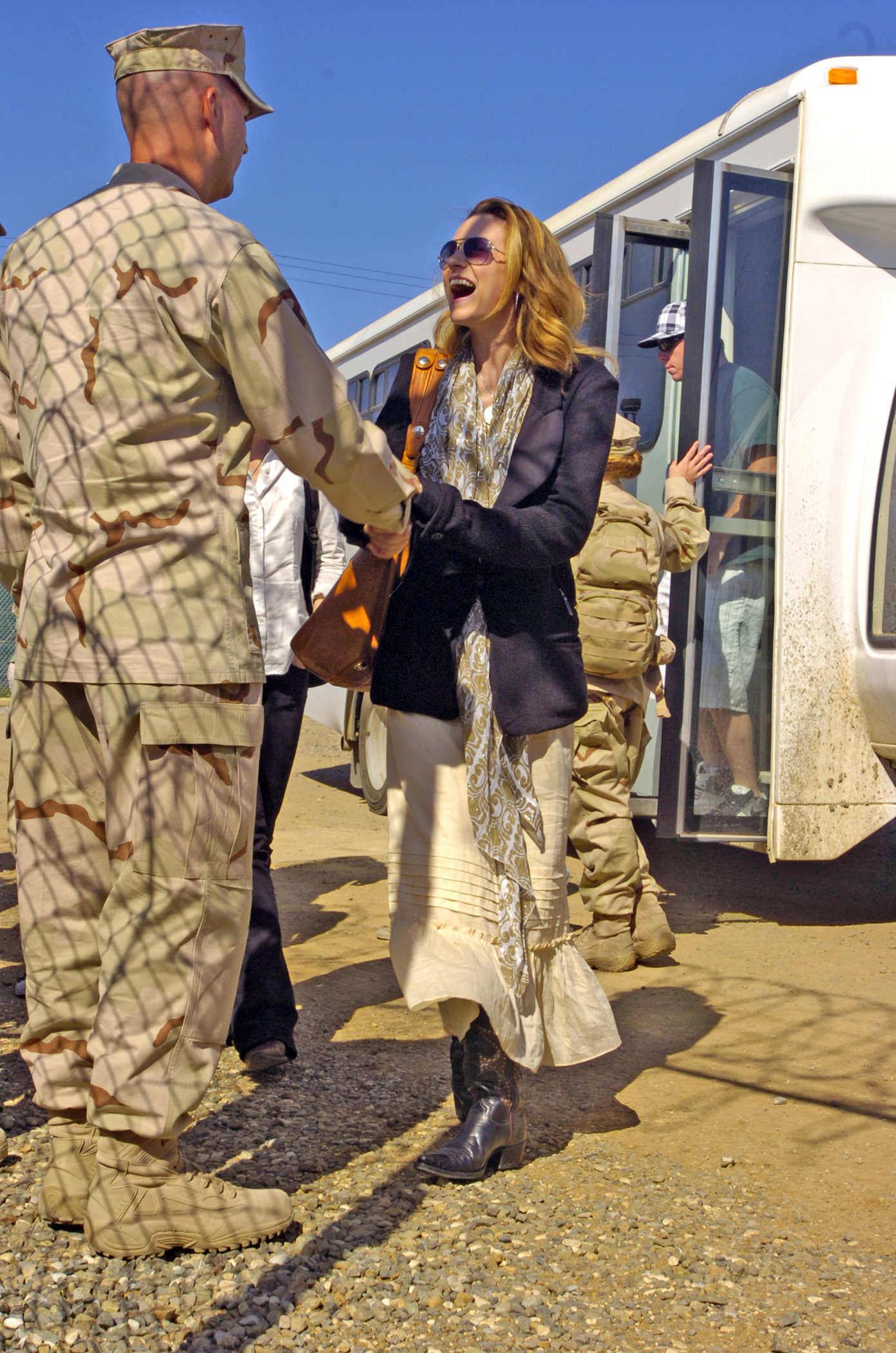
Hilarie Burton in June 2008

Burton was cast in The WB drama series One Tree Hill as Peyton Sawyer, an independent visual and musical artist and cheerleader, in April 2003. The series premiered on September 23, 2003, and went on to be the network's top rated program of the year. The role was considered Burton's breakout role and is her best known to date. For her role in the series, Burton was featured on the cover of Maxim, American Cheerleader Magazine and People. Her performance received critical praise and she earned three Teen Choice Award nominations. In May 2009, The CW announced Burton would not be returning for the show's seventh season based on her own decision not to return, contrary to rumors she left owing to salary issues.

One Tree Hill heightened Burton's public profile. In May 2007, she was ranked #77 in Maxim's "Hot 100 List of 2007". She also appeared on the cover of the November 2006 edition of Maxim with One Tree Hill co-stars Sophia Bush and Danneel Harris. In previous years, Burton ranked #2 on Femme Fatales' "The 50 Sexiest Women of 2005", and #12 on Much Music's "20 Hottest Women of 2003".

While still a One Tree Hill cast member, Burton made her feature film debut opposite Allison Janney and Cheryl Hines in the 2005 well-reviewed drama Our Very Own which centered on five small-town teenagers who dream of a better life. Burton and her co-stars received the Outstanding Ensemble Acting Award at the prestigious Sarasota Film Festival. Burton appeared in the 2007 Lifetime drama Normal Adolescent Behavior which followed a group of friends who are in a six-way polyfidelitous relationship. That same year, Burton co-starred in the supernatural horror film Solstice opposite Amanda Seyfried and Elisabeth Harnois. Burton also created her own production company, Southern Gothic Production (SoGoPro) in 2007, along with Nick Gray, Kelly Tenney, James Burton, and Meg Mortimer.

In 2008, Burton appeared in both the Fox Searchlight Pictures drama The Secret Life of Bees, as Deborah Owens, the deceased mother of Dakota Fanning's character Lily, and the limited release thriller The List. Burton was next cast in the film Bloodworth opposite Hilary Duff and Val Kilmer, an adaptation of the novel Provinces of Night by William Gay. The film premiered after her exit from One Tree Hill at the 2010 Santa Barbara International Film Festival but made little money in limited release. Burton had a recurring arc in the USA Network crime drama series White Collar in 2010 as Sara Ellis, an insurance investigator in the second season. She was upgraded to a series regular in 2011 for the third season but switched back to the recurring cast in the fourth season. 2012 saw Burton guest-starring on the ABC police comedy-drama Castle in the season 4 episode "An Embarrassment of Bitches" as Kay Cappuccio, a reality television star who is accused of murder. Next came a recurring role in the ABC medical drama Grey's Anatomy for the final three episodes of the 2013 ninth season as Dr. Lauren Boswell. That fall, Burton had a recurring role on the short-lived CBS drama Hostages. Burton reunited with One Tree Hill co-star Tyler Hilton for a recurring role on CBS sci-fi drama Extant in 2015. Burton appeared as Karen Palmer, the DEA agent love interest of main character Martin Riggs (Clayne Crawford) on Lethal Weapon from the seventh episode of the first season in 2016 through the third episode of the second season in 2017.

In November 2017, Burton spoke out in light of charges that One Tree Hill creator Mark Schwahn had sexually harassed some of the female crew, alleging that she had also been sexually assaulted by Schwahn. Burton guest-starred in the tenth season of The Walking Dead as Negan's wife Lucille, appearing alongside her real-life husband Jeffrey Dean Morgan who plays Negan. From 2021 to 2024, Burton was a co-host on the Drama Queens podcast along with her One Tree Hill co-stars, Sophia Bush and Bethany Joy Lenz. She left the podcast following the completion of reacting to the episodes of the show she starred in, leading her to ''question what she brought [to the podcast]". She was succeeded as host by Robert Buckley, who starred in seasons 7-9 of One Tree Hill.

=== Writing ===
On May 5, 2020, Burton published her first non-fiction book, The Rural Diaries: Love, Livestock, and Big Life Lessons Down on Mischief Farm. She published her memoir, Grimoire Girl: A Memoir of Magic and Mischief, on April 25, 2023.

== Personal life ==
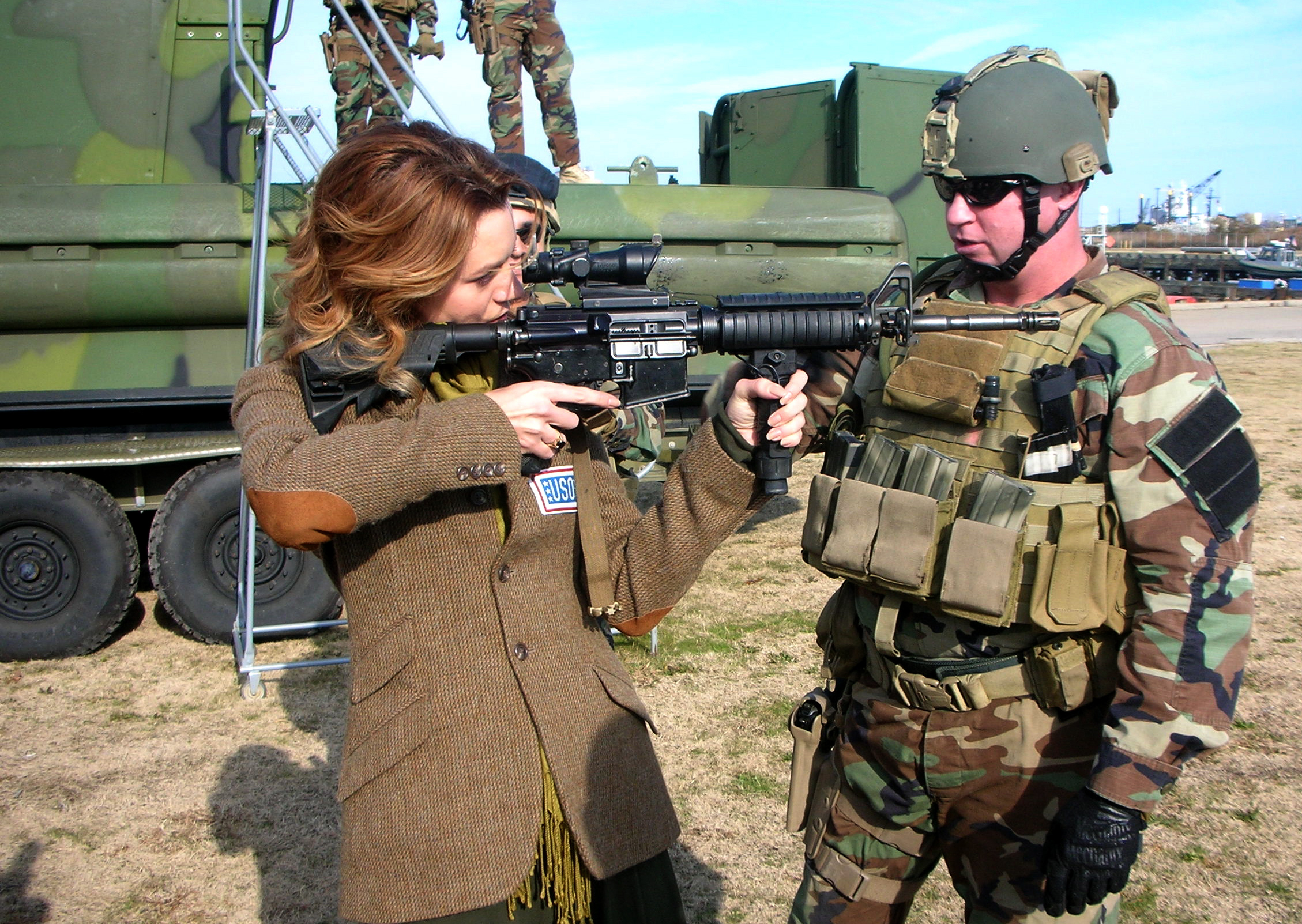
Burton holding an M4 carbine during a USO visit

During her time on One Tree Hill, Burton lived in Wilmington, North Carolina, where the show was filmed. She began dating Jeffrey Dean Morgan in 2009, after being introduced by Jensen and Danneel Ackles. The couple's first child, a son, was born in March 2010, and their second child, a daughter, was born in February 2018. Having lived in Los Angeles, California, the couple moved to Hudson Valley, New York, following their son's birth. In 2014, Burton and Morgan purchased Samuel's Sweet Shop in the village of Rhinebeck with Paul and Julie Rudd and producer Andy Ostroy. In 2018, Burton and Morgan purchased a 100-acre (400,000 m^{2}) working farm, which they named Mischief Farm. The couple married on October 5, 2019, in a ceremony officiated by Jensen Ackles.

Burton has been candid on social media about the couple's struggle to conceive, stating that it took five years to successfully carry a second baby to term. Subsequently, she has spoken out publicly in support of abortion rights after the Supreme Court decision on Dobbs v. Jackson Women's Health Organization that overturned Roe v. Wade, stating:

This is my child. My beloved. My daughter. It is no secret I struggled with infertility. Losing multiple pregnancies before her was traumatic. But female bodies are all different and unpredictable. Having an abortion after my fetus died allowed for my uterus to heal in a way that made it healthy enough to carry future pregnancies. It doesn't matter if you use the term D&C. The official word on the hospital paperwork is abortion. That's what it was.

Burton has family in Wilmington. Throughout the years, she has been an advocate for the Wilmington community and promoted and raised money for the film Wilmington on Fire, about the 1898 Wilmington massacre.

== Discography ==
=== Soundtrack ===
- The Road Mix: Music from the Television Series One Tree Hill, Volume 3 (2007)

== Filmography ==
=== Film ===
Year	Title	Role	Notes
2005	Our Very Own	Bobbie Chester	
2007	The List	Jo Johnston	
2007	Normal Adolescent Behavior	Ryan	
2008	Solstice	Alicia	
2008	The Secret Life of Bees	Deborah Owens	
2009	The True-Love Tale of Boyfriend & Girlfriend	Boyfriend	Short film; also producer, art director and costume designer
2010	Bloodworth	Hazel	
2014	Black Eyed Dog		
2017	Growing Up Smith	Nancy Brunner	
2020	618 to Omaha	Mrs. Jenkins	Short film
2024	Bloody Axe Wound	—N/a	Producer

=== Television ===
Year	Title	Role	Notes
2000–2008	Total Request Live	Herself	Co-host
2001	Becoming Presents: Wannabe	Herself	Correspondent, select episodes
2002	Dawson's Creek	VJ Hilarie	Episode: "100 Light Years from Home"
2003	MTV's Iced Out New Year's Eve	Herself	Host
2003	MTV Does Miami	Herself	Co-host
2003	Diary	Herself	Episode: "One Tree Hill"
2003	The Real World: Las Vegas	Herself	Reunion host: "7 The Hard Way"
2003	Pepsi Smash	Herself	Host
2003–2009	One Tree Hill	Peyton Sawyer	Main role; 130 episodes
2005	Unscripted	Herself	Episode #1.5
2008	Little Britain USA	Lesbian College Student	Episode #1.6
2010–2013	White Collar	Sara Ellis	Main role; 22 episodes
2012	Castle	Kay Cappuccio	Episode: "An Embarrassment of Bitches"
2012	Naughty or Nice	Krissy Kringle	Television film
2013	Grey's Anatomy	Dr. Lauren Boswell	3 episodes
2013	Hostages	Samantha	4 episodes
2013	Christmas on the Bayou	Katherine "Kat"	Television film
2014–2015	Forever	Iona Payne / Molly Dawes	2 episodes
2015	Surprised by Love	Josie Mayfield	Television film
2015	Extant	Anna Schaefer	6 episodes
2015	Last Chance for Christmas	Annie	Television film
2016	Togetherness	Kennedy	Episode: "Advanced Pretend"
2016	Summer Villa	Terry Russell	Television film
2016–2017	Lethal Weapon	Karen Palmer	6 episodes
2018	The Christmas Contract	Jolie Guidry	Television film; also co-producer
2019	A Christmas Wish	Faith	Television film; also producer
2020	Friday Night in with the Morgans	Herself	Co-host: 7 episodes; also executive producer
2020	Council of Dads	Margot	6 episodes
2020	Dear Christmas	Caller	Television film
2021	The Walking Dead	Lucille	Episode: "Here's Negan"
2021–2026	True Crime Story: It Couldn't Happen Here	Herself	Host: 23 episodes; also executive producer
2022	Good Sam	Gretchen Taylor	Episode: "Keep Talking"
2025	The Walking Dead: Dead City	Lucille	Episode: "Novi Dan, Novi Početak"

=== Music video ===
Year	Title	Artist	Role
2005	"The Mixed Tape"	Jack's Mannequin	Peyton Sawyer

=== Audiobook ===
Year	Title	Role
2020	The Rural Diaries: Love, Livestock, and Big Life Lessons Down on Mischief Farm	Narrator
2023	Grimoire Girl: A Memoir of Magic and Mischief	Narrator

=== Podcast ===
Year	Title	Role	Notes
2021	Bridgewater	Shelley Hoskins	3 episodes
2021–2024	Drama Queens	Herself	Co-host; 212 episodes

== Awards and nominations ==
Year	Association	Category	Work	Result
2004	Teen Choice Awards	Choice Breakout TV Star – Female	One Tree Hill	Nominated
2004	Teen Choice Awards	Choice TV Actress: Drama/Action/Adventure	One Tree Hill	Nominated
2005	Teen Choice Awards	Choice TV Actress: Drama	One Tree Hill	Nominated
2006	Sarasota Film Festival	Outstanding Ensemble Acting	Our Very Own	Won
2008	Teen Choice Awards	Choice TV Actress: Drama	One Tree Hill	Nominated
2008	Hollywood Film Awards	Ensemble Acting of the Year (Shared with cast)	The Secret Life of Bees	Won

== Bibliography ==
- The Rural Diaries: Love, Livestock, and Big Life Lessons Down on Mischief Farm (2020)
- Grimoire Girl: A Memoir of Magic and Mischief (2023)
