= Mission Bell =

Mission Bell may refer to:

== Music ==
=== Albums ===
- The Mission Bell, a 2005 album by Delirious?
- Mission Bell (Everly album), 2008
- Mission Bell (Amos Lee album), 2011

=== Songs ===
- "Mission Bell" (Donnie Brooks song), 1960
- "Mission Bell" (Stan Ridgway song), 1999

== Other ==
- Mission bell markers, marking the route between California Missions
- Fritillaria or mission bells, a type of lily
