= Our Very Own (2005 film) =

2005 film by Cameron Watson

- DVD cover
- Directed by: Cameron Watson
- Written by: Cameron Watson
- Produced by: Shannon McMahon Lichte; Maggie Biggar; Steve Cubine; Cameron Watson
- Starring: Allison Janney; Cheryl Hines; Jason Ritter; Hilarie Burton; Beth Grant; Keith Carradine
- Cinematography: Roberto "Tito" Blasini
- Edited by: Brian Anton
- Music by: John Swihart
- Production company: GADA Films
- Distributed by: Miramax
- Release date: June 22, 2005 (LA Film Festival)
- Running time: 106 minutes
- Country: United States
- Language: English
- Budget: $1 million (estimated)

Our Very Own is a 2005 American independent coming-of-age drama film directed, co-produced, and written by Cameron Watson. It stars Allison Janney, Cheryl Hines, Jason Ritter, Hilarie Burton, Beth Grant, and Keith Carradine. The film follows five teenagers in Shelbyville, Tennessee, whose dreams of a better life have been inspired by the success of the Hollywood actress Sondra Locke.

Our Very Own premiered at the LA Film Festival on June 22, 2005. It had its television premiere on December 11, 2006, and was released on DVD on July 3, 2007. At the 21st Independent Spirit Awards, Janney was nominated for Best Supporting Female for her performance in the film.

== Plot ==
Set in Shelbyville, Tennessee, in 1978, the film centers on high school student Clancy Whitfield, whose family is facing financial ruin due to his father Billy's inability to hold a job because of his drinking. His mother Joan desperately is trying to make ends meet while their dining room furniture is repossessed and the bank is threatening to foreclose on the house. She finds herself the subject of gossip but supported by Sally Crowder, her friend since childhood.

A rumor that former resident Sondra Locke will be returning to town to attend the annual Tennessee Walking Horse National Celebration and the opening of her film Every Which Way but Loose at the local movie house has Clancy and his friends Melora, Bobbie, Ray, and Glen eagerly anticipating her arrival. In the hope she'll see it and help them escape their small town and achieve fame of their own, the quintet decides to present a musical tribute to her at the Chamber of Commerce-sponsored talent show. Their performance is applauded wildly by the audience, but they have less success meeting the elusive Locke.

== Cast ==
- Allison Janney as Joan Whitfield
- Keith Carradine as Billy Whitfield
- Jason Ritter as Clancy Whitfield
- Autumn Reeser as Melora
- Hilarie Burton as Bobbie
- Michael McKee as Glen
- Derek Carter as Ray
- Cheryl Hines as Sally Crowder
- Mary Badham as Mrs. Nutbush
- Steven Griffith as Buzz
- Amy Landers as Rhonda
- Beth Grant as Virginia Kendal
- Faith Prince as Athylene
- Dale Dickey as Skillet
- Allison Mackie as Shelia
- T. Scott Cunningham as Dr. Dunwitty

== Critical reception ==
Robert Koehler of Variety called the film "a sensitive if not fully developed dramatization of the downside of the American Dream" and added, "An authentic sense of place - as well as a stirring performance by Allison Janney leading an impressive cast - aid an otherwise light and unresolved novelistic film." Derek Armstrong of TV Guide wrote the film "just so happens to be one of the most warmly nostalgic hidden treasures of 2005", and that Watson has "got a real sense of these people -- how they carry on humorously mundane conversations at the greasy spoon diner, and how they push each other in shopping carts as the main source of Friday-night entertainment."

== Awards and nominations ==
The movie was named Best Feature Film at the Bluegrass Independent Film Festival, won an award for Ensemble Acting at the Sarasota Film Festival, and garnered Prism Awards for Allison Janney and Keith Carradine. Janney was nominated for the Independent Spirit Award for Best Supporting Female but lost to Amy Adams in Junebug.
