= Everly (band) =

American band

- Origin: Battle Ground, Washington, US
- Genres: Pop rock, acoustic, bluegrass
- Instruments: Vocals, guitar, piano
- Years active: 2008–2012
- Label: Hilasterion Records
- Past members: Bethany Joy Lenz; Amber Sweeney

Everly was an American folk musical duo formed in Battle Ground, Washington in 2008 by friends Bethany Joy Lenz and Amber Sweeney. Their debut EP, Mission Bell, was launched on iTunes. The duo released a series of digitally released B Track albums that have been featured on The CW television series One Tree Hill, on which Lenz was an actress and director of.

On November 29, 2012, Lenz confirmed that Everly split and will no longer be making music.

== History ==
=== Debut ===
Lenz and Sweeney formed Everly in 2008. On November 5, 2008, Everly released a three-song acoustic EP on iTunes entitled Mission Bell. The duo released the EP through music outlets iTunes, Amazon and CD Baby. Mission Bell featuring "Home Is Me – You Are Mine", "Stars", and "Little Children", all written by Lenz and Sweeney. On November 15, 2008, the duo released three additional tracks added onto Mission Bell titled "Hotel Café", "Mrs. Scott", and "Scheming Star", along with a bonus track titled "Karen's Café" that was a specifically altered version of "Hotel Café" for an episode of Lenz's television series One Tree Hill.

Mission Bell reached the No. 1 spot on CD Baby, an online music store specializing in the sale of physical compact discs and digital music downloads from independent musicians directly to consumers. The duo also digitally released an acoustic Christmas album in 2009 titled Fireside.

== Everly on One Tree Hill ==
Lenz performed a string of original tracks on One Tree Hill due to her character's ambitions to reestablish her music career. Everly continued to use One Tree Hill as an avenue to promote their music.

In the episode titled "Even Fairy Tale Characters Would Be Jealous," Lenz's character Haley James Scott's friend Peyton Sawyer produces a USO concert at the military base where her brother is stationed. The concert also featured Lenz's then-husband Michael Galeotti's band Enation, the band Angels & Airwaves, and occasional One Tree Hill guest star and fellow musician Kate Voegele. After its airing, Everly's single Feel This rose to No. 14 on the iTunes folk charts and allowed them to maintain the No. 1 top seller spot on CD Baby for several weeks.

In the episode titled "We Three (My Echo, My Shadow and Me)", Karen's café is transformed into a glamorous nightclub with Lucas as its proprietor and Haley as the cabaret singer; Lenz premiered more songs featured in Everly's EP.

In the seventh season of One Tree Hill, Lenz re-released "Quicksand", a song originally written and performed by Lenz for her album with Epic. Her character then began her first solo tour, Flying Machine. In the fictional tour, songs written and performed by Everly were featured on the show while concurrently being released through iTunes and CD Baby.

== Discography ==
=== EPs ===
| Year | Title | Record label | Notes |
|---|---|---|---|
| 2008 | Mission Bell | Hilasterion Records | Debut EP. Includes "Home is Me – You are Mine". |
| 2009 | Fireside | Hilasterion Records | Holiday EP |
| 2010 | B Tracks: Vol. 3 | Hilasterion Records | |
| 2010 | B Tracks: Full Collection | Hilasterion Records | Includes all B Tracks: Vol. 1–3 |

=== Singles ===
| Year | Title | Record label | Album |
|---|---|---|---|
| 2009 | "Quicksand" | Hilasterion Records | B Tracks: Vol. 1 – Single |
| 2009 | "Maybe" | Hilasterion Records | B Tracks: Vol. 2 – Single |

=== Televised performances ===
| Year | Program | Episode | Track title |
|---|---|---|---|
| 2009 | One Tree Hill | #7.01 – 4:30 am (Apparently They Were Travelling Abroad) | "Quicksand" |
| 2009 | One Tree Hill | #7.09 – Now You Lift Your Eyes to the Sun | "Maybe" |
| 2009 | CW Television | [December 18, 2009] | "O Holy Night" |
| 2010 | One Tree Hill | #7.13 – Weeks Go by Like Days | "Flying Machine" "We Belong" "Girl in the Moon" "Never Gonna Be (C'mon, C'mon)" Only Bethany Joy Lenz |

== See also ==
- Bethany Joy Lenz discography
