= List of One Tree Hill soundtracks =

The following is a list of soundtracks that have been released for the TV show One Tree Hill.

== One Tree Hill ==
One Tree Hill

Soundtrack album by Various artists
- Released: January 25, 2005
- Recorded: Various times
- Genre: Various genres
- Label: Maverick
- Producer: Butch Walker

One Tree Hill – Music from the WB Television Series, Vol. 1 is a compilation album, compiled of songs featured in the teen drama One Tree Hill (which at the time this album was released aired on The WB, and later on The CW). It was released on January 25, 2005 on Maverick Records.

Track listing
No.	Title	Performing artist	Length
1.	"I Don't Want to Be" (live)	Gavin DeGraw
2.	"The Good Kind"	The Wreckers
3.	"Kill"	Jimmy Eat World
4.	"Re-Offender"	Travis
5.	"Overdue"	The Get Up Kids
6.	"Funny Little Feeling"	Rock n Roll Soldiers
7.	"Glad" (acoustic)	Tyler Hilton
8.	"Shoot Your Gun"	22-20s
9.	"Sidewalks" (acoustic)	Story of the Year
10.	"When the Stars Go Blue"	Tyler Hilton and Bethany Joy Lenz
11.	"Everybody's Changing"	Keane
12.	"Mixtape"	Butch Walker
13.	"The First Cut Is the Deepest" (acoustic)	Sheryl Crow
14.	"Lie In the Sound"	Trespassers William

== Friends with Benefit ==
Friends with Benefit

Soundtrack album by Various artists
- Released: February 7, 2006
- Recorded: Various times
- Genre: Various genres
- Label: Maverick Records

Friends with Benefit: Music from the Television Series One Tree Hill, Volume 2 was released on February 7, 2006 and a portion of the proceeds has been donated to The National Breast Cancer Foundation. A story regarding the album's creation by characters Peyton Sawyer and Ellie Harp to raise funds for breast cancer research featured as a plot element on the third season of the show. Several of the artists appearing on the album also appeared on the show, including Gavin DeGraw, Fall Out Boy, Audioslave, Tyler Hilton as well as leukemia survivor Andrew McMahon and his band, Jack's Mannequin. Bethany Joy Lenz who portrays Haley James Scott in the series also sang a song on the show that appeared on this album. The album debuted and peaked at No. 54 on the Billboard 200 and No. 3 on the Billboard Top Soundtracks chart. Allmusic gave the album 3 out of 5 stars, concluding the compilation was an "eclectic set that improves on the original album."

Track listing
No.	Title	Performing artist	Length
1.	"Feeling a Moment"	Feeder
2.	"The Mixed Tape"	Jack's Mannequin
3.	"Be Yourself"	Audioslave
4.	"Always Love"	Nada Surf
5.	"Jealous Guy"	Gavin DeGraw
6.	"Son's Gonna Rise"	Citizen Cope
7.	"Middle of Nowhere"	Hot Hot Heat
8.	"Missing You"	Tyler Hilton
9.	"Light Years Away"	MoZella
10.	"Please Please Please"	Shout Out Louds
11.	"I've Got a Dark Alley and a Bad Idea That Says You Should Shut Your Mouth (Summer Song)"	Fall Out Boy
12.	"23"	Jimmy Eat World
13.	"Halo"	Bethany Joy Lenz
14.	"Coffee & Cigarettes"	Michelle Featherstone
15.	"For Blue Skies"	Strays Don't Sleep

== The Road Mix ==
The Road Mix

Soundtrack album by Various artists
- Released: April 3, 2007 (U.S. and Canada)
- Recorded: Various times
- Genre: Various genres
- Label: Maverick

The Road Mix: Music from the Television Series One Tree Hill, Volume 3, the third soundtrack compiled of music featured on the teen drama One Tree Hill (which airs on The CW in the United States) was released on April 3, 2007.

Track listing
No.	Title	Performing artist	Length
1.	"Don't Wait"	Dashboard Confessional
2.	"Stay Away"	The Honorary Title
3.	"Naive"	The Kooks
4.	"The Funeral"	Band of Horses
5.	"Heartbeats"	José González
6.	"You'll Ask for Me"	Tyler Hilton
7.	"I Gotcha"	Lupe Fiasco
8.	"Good Vibrations"	Gym Class Heroes
9.	"Lay Me Down"	The Wreckers
10.	"Soon Enough"	The Constantines
11.	"He Lays in the Reins"	Calexico / Iron & Wine
12.	"Tell Me What It Takes"	Lucero
13.	"Just Be Simple"	Songs: Ohia
14.	"World Spins Madly On"	The Weepies
15.	"Non-Believer"	La Rocca
16.	"Chloe Dancer/Crown of Thorns"	Mother Love Bone

Bonus track (not on all CDs)
No.	Title	Performing artist	Length
17.	"Peyton's Podcast Remix"	Hilarie Burton

== Music from One Tree Hill ==
Music from One Tree Hill

Soundtrack album by Various artists
- Released: November 13, 2008
- Recorded: Various times
- Genre: Various genres
- Label: iTunes

Music from One Tree Hill is an iTunes Plus soundtrack features songs from the sixth season of the teen drama One Tree Hill, which airs on The CW. The iTunes description reads "In the five years since its inception, the teen drama One Tree Hill has established itself as a musical force in the world of television. The smalltown escapades are invariably scored by some of the more interesting musical talents in the world today – putting the show in the same career-aiding force for new musicians as programs like The O.C. and Grey's Anatomy. The show has also brought many artists into the plot line, either as performers (see Sheryl Crow) or the occasional love interest (see Fall Out Boy's Pete Wentz). Now you can catch up with music that has been featured in the most current season – these are the tracks you won't find on any other One Tree Hill soundtrack."

Track listing
No.	Title	Performing artist	Length
1.	"Save You"	Matthew Perryman Jones
2.	"I Don't Care"	Fall Out Boy
3.	"Where Love Went Wrong"	Augustana
4.	"Sea Song"	Lisa Hannigan
5.	"A Piece for You"	Meaghan Smith
6.	"Are You Lightning?"	Nada Surf
7.	"Hazy"	Rosi Golan
8.	"Behind Your Eyes"	Jon Foreman
9.	"Sincerely Hope It's You"	Edith Backlund
10.	"A Falling Through"	Ray LaMontagne
11.	"(Get Off Your) High Horse Lady"	Oasis
12.	"Devil In Me" (Live acoustic)	Kate Voegele
13.	"Lifeline"	Angels & Airwaves
14.	"You Can't Break a Broken Heart"	Kate Voegele
15.	"Feel This"	Bethany Joy Galeotti
16.	"Can't Go Back Now"	The Weepies
17.	"You've Got Growin' Up to Do"	Joshua Radin / Patty Griffin
18.	"Leaving You"	Corey Crowder
19.	"Sheets"	Damien Jurado
20.	"Paris"	La Rocca
21.	"Psychotic Girl"	The Black Keys
22.	"Stop!"	Against Me!
23.	"Poke"	Frightened Rabbit
24.	"Don't Say"	St. Lola in the Fields
25.	"I Want Something That I Want"	Grace Potter / Bethany Joy Galeotti
26.	"Quiet in My Town"	Civil Twilight
27.	"Scream"	Chris Cornell

== Charts ==
=== Commercial performance ===
Album	Chart (2005)	Peak position
Volume 1	U.S. Billboard 200	51
Volume 1	U.S. Billboard Top Internet Albums	51
Volume 1	U.S. Billboard Top Soundtracks	5
Album	Chart (2006)	Peak position
Volume 2	U.S. Billboard 200	54
Volume 2	U.S. Billboard Top Internet Albums	54
Volume 2	U.S. Billboard Top Soundtracks	3
Album	Chart (2006)	Peak position
Volume 3	U.S. Billboard Top Soundtracks	10
