= Love146 =

U.S.-based anti-child trafficking non-profit organization

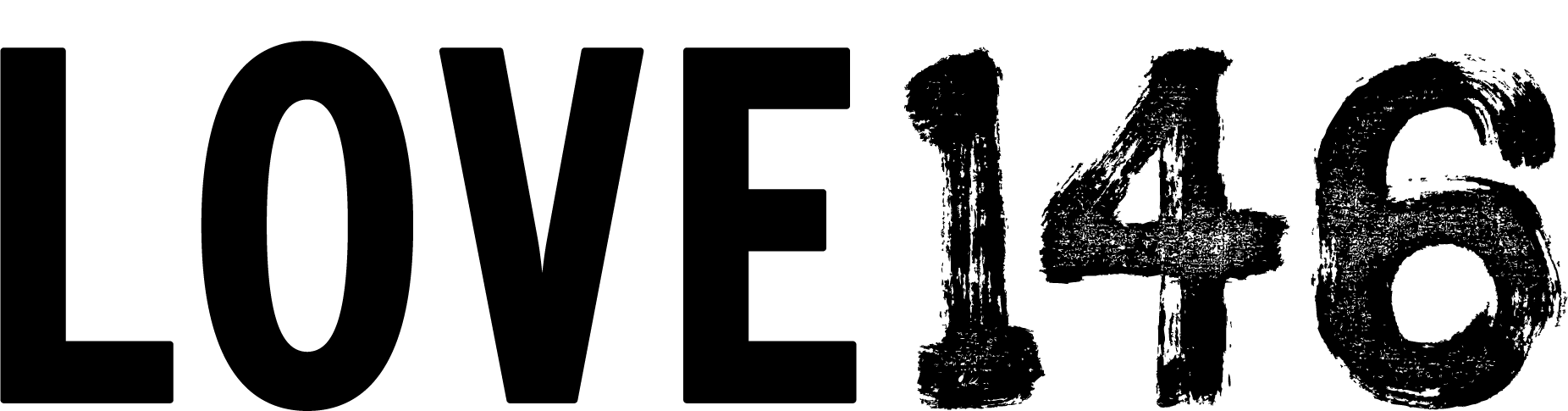
- The logo of Love146
- Established: 2004
- Headquarters: New Haven, Connecticut
- Location(s): Field projects and partnerships in the United States, the United Kingdom, the Philippines
- Key people: Rob Morris (CEO & Co-Founder)
- Revenue: ▼$4.4 million (2020-2021 FY)
- Employees: 54 (2018-2019)
- Website: love146.org
- Formerly called: Justice for Children International (2004-2007)

Love146 is a U.S.-based 501(c)(3) non-profit international anti-child trafficking organization.

== History ==
Love146 was founded in 2002, when the group's co-founders, Rob Morris, Lamont Hiebert, Desirea Rodgers, and Caroline Hahm, went on an exploratory trip to Southeast Asia to see how they could help combat child trafficking. According to Love146, as part of an undercover operation, investigators took several co-founders into a brothel where they witnessed young girls being sold for sex. The girls were given identification numbers pinned to their dresses. One girl in particular stood out. Her number was 146. The co-founders returned to the US and began Love146.

Prior to the establishing of Love146, co-founder and president, Rob Morris, worked with Mercy Ships International.

Love146 became an official public charity in March 2004, under the name Justice for Children International. In 2007, the group changed their name to Love146. Baume & Mercier sent Pulitzer Prize winning photojournalist Carolyn Cole to Southeast Asia to take photos in support of Love146. In 2008, Baume & Mercier hosted an exhibition of her photos in New York City titled "Into the Light".

28 states have utilized the organization's curriculum as of 2022.
