= Mission Bell (Everly album) =

Mission Bell – EP

EP by Everly
- Released: November 5, 2008
- Genre: Folk, acoustic, bluegrass, pop rock
- Length: 23:19
- Label: Hilasterion Records

Mission Bell – EP was released by the musical duo Everly on November 5, 2008. Their EP entitled Mission Bell is an eclectic mix of country, folk and pop rock sounds. Their EP features ten original tracks with a bonus track altered specifically for the television series One Tree Hill. All songs are written and performed by Bethany Joy Galeotti and music partner Amber Sweeney. The group released an EP through music outlets, iTunes, Amazon and CD Baby.

== Album information ==
Everly's statement on CD Baby describes their coming together to form Mission Bell as "birthed of a friendship and a sisterhood that's been many years in the making, and we are proud to present this short collection of music as a 'teaser' for what is to come."

Bethany Joy Lenz and musical acts Angels & Airwaves and occasional One Tree Hill guest star Kate Voegele teamed up with the USO for a live concert event for military personnel. The event also included Lenz's ex-husband's band Enation, and music partner Amber Sweeney who accompanied Lenz on stage to perform Lenz's hit single Feel This and song entitled The Sweetest Thing. The duo also performed their single written for troops, Home Is Me – You Are Mine.

== Mission Bell on One Tree Hill ==
The USO concert was filmed and formed the basis for a One Tree Hill episode originally aired on November 10, 2008. In the episode titled Even Fairy Tale Characters Would Be Jealous Lenz's character Haley James Scott's friend Peyton Sawyer produces a massive USO concert at the military base where her brother is stationed.

Notably, Lenz as character Haley James Scott, sang songs featured in Everly's EP in the episode titled We Three (My Echo, My Shadow and Me). In this very special episode Chad Michael Murray penned a homage to the classic films of the 1940s. Karen's Café is transformed into a glamorous nightclub with Lucas Scott (Chad Michael Murray) as its proprietor and Haley James Scott as the cabaret singer.

== Album success ==
Receiving an excited response from fans, Mission Bell reached the No. 1 spot on CD Baby, an online music store specializing in the sale of physical compact discs and digital music downloads from independent musicians directly to consumers. Mission Bell also rose to No. 14 on the iTunes Folk Charts with the song for the troops: "Home Is Me. You Are Mine".

== Track listing ==
1. "Karen's Café" (bonus track for One Tree Hill) – 3:18
2. "Hotel Café" – 3:20
3. "Home Is Me – You Are Mine" – 4:07
4. "Mrs. Scott" – 2:33
5. "Scheming Stars" – 3:01
6. "Stars" – 3:02
7. "Little Children" – 4:38

=== iTunes version ===
1. "Home Is Me – You Are Mine" – 4:07
2. "Stars" – 3:02
3. "Little Children" – 4:38
4. "Mrs. Scott" (from One Tree Hill) – 2:33
5. "Scheming Stars" (from One Tree Hill) – 3:01
6. "Hotel Café" (from One Tree Hill) – 3:20
7. "Karen's Café" (from One Tree Hill) – 3:18

=== Hard Case listing ===
1. "Home Is Me – You Are Mine"
2. "Stars"
3. "Little Children"
4. "The Sweetest Thing"
5. "Mrs. Scott"
6. "Scheming Star"
7. "Hotel Café" Originally Song
8. "Karen's Café" Bonus Song for One Tree Hill

== See also ==
- Bethany Joy Galeotti Discography
- One Tree Hill (TV series)
