= Stilnest =

German online jewelry company

- Company type: Jewelry eCommerce
- Industry: Fashion
- Founded: 2013
- Founders: Julian Leitloff, Florian Krebs, Raoul Schäkermann, Mike Schäkermann, Michael Aigner, Tim Bibow
- Headquarters: Kastanienallee 37, 10119 Berlin
- Area served: Global
- Key people: Tim Bibow, CEO
- Products: Jewelry
- Website: stilnest.com

stilnest (German for "style nest") is an online jewelry company based in Berlin. Stilnest is known for producing made-to-order to avoid overproduction and make the jewelry industry more sustainable.

In the past, stilnest has worked with social media stars and celebrities, such as British YouTube star Anna Saccone, German YouTube star and actress Nilam Farooq and German model Stefanie Giesinger. The company currently ships to 65 countries worldwide.

The company has in the past used 3d printing technology to help produce its jewelry.

== History ==
The company was founded in 2013 by Julian Leitloff, Florian Krebs, Raoul Schäkermann, Mike Schäkermann, Michael Aigner and Tim Bibow, and has raised $1.2 Million in seed rounds from Investment Bank Berlin, online retailer Klingel and from Zeppelin University.
