= Tyler Hilton =

American singer-songwriter and actor (born 1983)

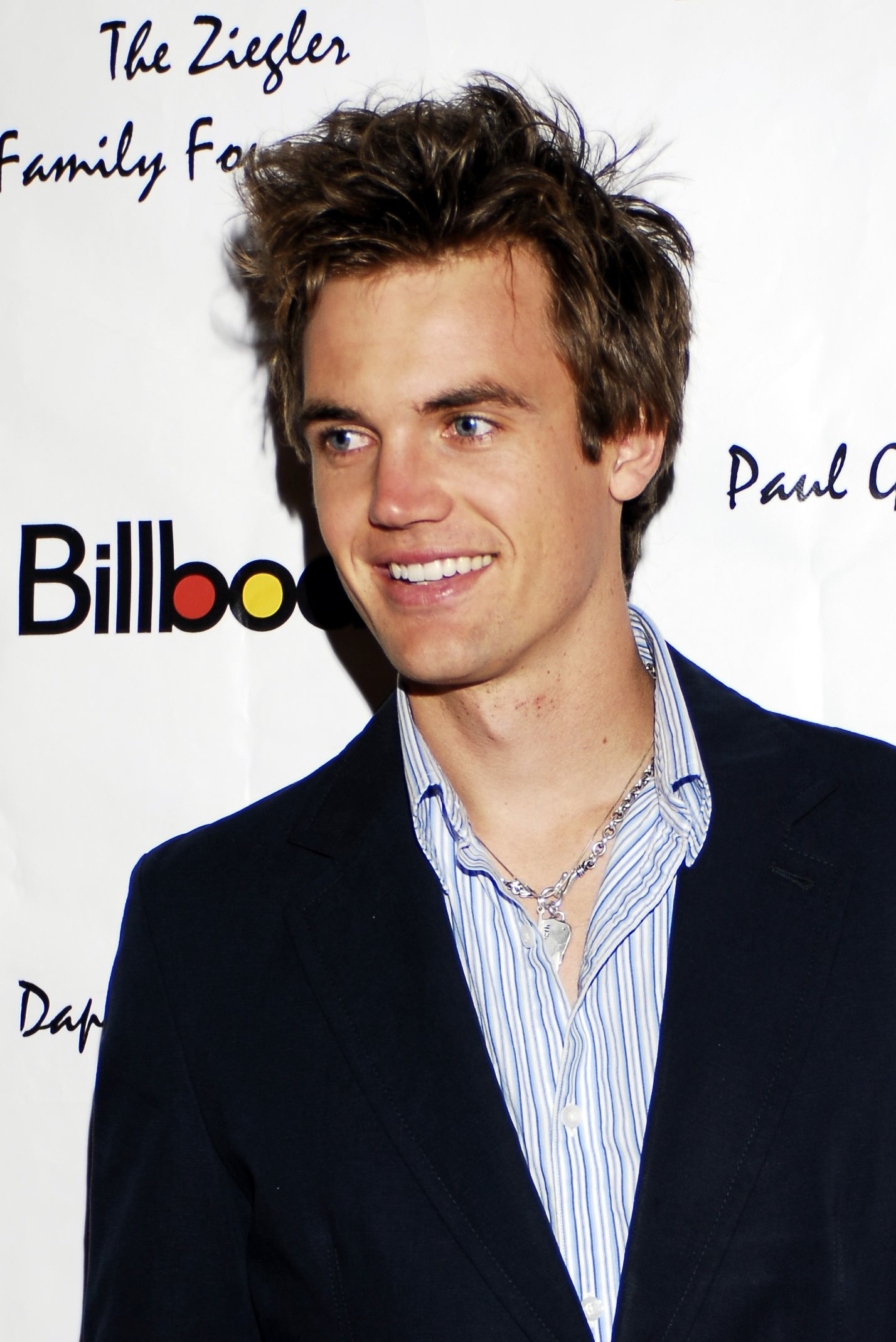
- Hilton at an Academy Awards afterparty, February 25, 2007

Background information
- Born: Tyler James Hilton; November 22, 1983 (age 42); Palm Springs, California, U.S.
- Origin: Bermuda Dunes, California, U.S.
- Genres: Indie rock; folk
- Occupations: Singer-songwriter; actor
- Instruments: Vocals; guitar; piano
- Years active: 2000–present
- Spouse: Megan Park (m. 2015; div. 2026)
- Website: Official website

Tyler James Hilton (born November 22, 1983), is an American musician, actor, and author. He is known for playing Chris Keller, a prominent recurring character in the WB/CW series One Tree Hill, and Elvis Presley in the Johnny Cash biopic Walk the Line. His professional career in music began in 2000.

== Early years ==
Hilton was born in Palm Springs, California to Kristy and Robert George Hilton. Raised in Bermuda Dunes, California, Hilton grew up around music and began teaching himself Elvis Presley songs at an early age. After a brief stint in Northern California, his family moved back to the Palm Springs area, where he wrote his first song about a girl named Rhian, whom he attended school with. Hilton's family made another move back to Coachella Valley for his high school endeavours, where, at La Quinta High School, he started a band with some of his classmates. The band did not show much progress, so Hilton began to enter open mic nights and went to local coffee shops to play his own music.

== Career ==
=== Music ===
Hilton heard a local radio station was giving away Jonny Lang concert tickets and called into The Mark & Brian radio show on KLOS in Los Angeles at the age of 16. While on the phone, he sang an a cappella version of Jonny Lang’s song "Breakin' Me". Mark & Brian were so impressed with Hilton's performance that they gave him a spot at the station's Christmas concert. Word of Hilton caught the ear of Maverick Records (owned by Warner Bros. Records), who signed him up with a record deal when he was 18. Hilton released a self-titled EP on April 6, 2004. All four songs were included on his first album The Tracks of Tyler Hilton released on September 28, 2004. After the release of his album, Hilton joined the likes of Avril Lavigne, Jet, 50 Cent, and Josh Groban as an artist chosen by AOL Breaker for his star potential.

In addition to his own albums, Hilton has also appeared on each of the three different One Tree Hill soundtrack albums, some with formerly unreleased material that cannot be found anywhere else. Most notably, the cover of the Ryan Adams song "When the Stars Go Blue", which was arranged into a duet with One Tree Hill star Bethany Joy Lenz for the show; also, a cover of "Missing You" by John Waite and the original track "You'll Ask For Me". In 2005, he was part of a 23-city concert tour along with Lenz, The Wreckers and Gavin Degraw. During the summer of that year, he opened for Hilary Duff on her "Still Most Wanted Tour".

His EP, Better on Beachwood, which features three songs was released in May 2009. Ladies & Gentlemen, another EP followed in April 2010 and features five songs. Both EPs are available on iTunes.

For five years, Hilton worked on an album called The Storms We Share. The album, containing some songs of Ladies & Gentlemen, was planned to be released in the late summer of 2010. However, when the direction changed at Warner Bros. Records, Hilton left the label resulting in the material not being released.

On June 27, 2011, Tyler Hilton's song "Faithful" was released on the soundtrack of Larry Crowne.

On January 11, 2012, Hilton released a free song called "Loaded Gun" from his upcoming album Forget the Storm on his website and was featured in the season 9 premiere episode of One Tree Hill following his return as Chris Keller. Hilton also debuted two songs from the album called "Kicking My Heels" and "Prince of Nothing Charming" on the show. On February 14, 2012, "Prince of Nothing Charming", the first single from Hilton's upcoming album Forget the Storm, was made available on iTunes. On March 7, 2012, Hilton revealed via Twitter that Forget The Storm, his first full-length LP since 2004, would be released on April 3, 2012. The album was produced by David Hodges among others and released through Hilton's own label, Hooptie Tune Records. He chose to title it "Forget the Storm" as a reference to his unreleased album, "The Storms We Share", and described it as "a little more rock and roll." Hilton began a tour in the United States with Dion Roy and "Dakota and Will" in March 2012 which ended mid June 2012. He also toured with Boyce Avenue in the UK and Ireland in June 2012 until July 2012 and will return late October 2012 on his own headlining tour after more US shows, wrapping up the year with shows back in the US. On December 7, 2016, Hilton release a new single called "Next To You" on iTunes; It was recorded on his Forget The Storm Deluxe Version as an acoustic version.

In 2017, Hilton released his cover of "Stay" by Rihanna and released his most recent single "Overtime" on August 15, 2017.

In 2024, Hilton recorded the soundtrack to former wife Megan Park's film "My Old Ass" along with Jaco Caraco.

In 2025, Hilton released an album of cover versions called Well Well Well in duets with former co-star Bethany Joy Lenz, which included a new version of "When the Stars Go Blue" as well as a cover of Tyler's "You'll Ask for Me". He also released a cover of Leonard Cohen's "Hallelujah" with former One Tree Hill co-star and frequent touring collaborator Kate Voegele.

In 2026, Hilton released his first new solo music in over six years, two singles, "Texas" and "Driving to Your House".

=== Acting ===
After his stint as Chris Keller on One Tree Hill, Hilton went on to appear in the Academy Award-winning film Walk the Line as a young Elvis Presley. For the part, Hilton was given the opportunity to cover two Elvis songs for the film: "Milk Cow Blues" and "That's All Right". Both songs are featured on the film's award-winning soundtrack.

In 2007, Hilton played the love interest in the American singer-songwriter Taylor Swift's music video for her song "Teardrops on My Guitar" and appeared in the 2008 film Charlie Bartlett. He was with Charlie Bartlett co-star and former wife Megan Park in the music video for the band Gloriana's song "(Kissed You) Good Night" released in January 2012.

Hilton also performed in a Season 4 episode of My Super Sweet Sixteen (Amberly) during a young girl's sweet 16 party. He also appeared on VH1's Single Ladies.

After a five-year break from One Tree Hill, Hilton returned as a regular for its ninth and final season.

In 2016, Hilton played Noah Casey, a billionaire love interest for the main character in Pitch.

=== Author ===
On February 26, 2025, Hilton announced his forthcoming children's book "Daddy: Live In Concert" would be released on April 8, 2025.

== Personal life ==
Hilton lives in London, Ontario and became a Canadian citizen in 2025. In 2013, he became engaged to Canadian actress Megan Park, whom he met on the set of Charlie Bartlett, in 2006, and they married on October 10, 2015. The couple have a daughter, born on December 20, 2019, and a son, born in 2024. They separated in 2025.

== Filmography ==
Film
Year	Title	Role
2005	Walk the Line	Elvis Presley
2007	Charlie Bartlett	Murphy Bivens

Television
Year	Title	Role	Notes
2004	American Dreams	Folk Singer	Episode 2.14 "Old Enough to Fight"
2004–2012	One Tree Hill	Chris Keller	Recurring role (Seasons 2–4), Main role (Season 9); 29 episodes
2011	Single Ladies	Reed Durham	Episode 1.05 "That's What Friends Are For"; Episode 1.07 "Take Me to the Next Phase"; Episode 1.08 "Lost Without You"; Episode 1.09 "Can't Hide Love"; Episode 1.10 "Everything Ain't What It Seems"; Episode 1.11 "Is This the End?"
2013	Christmas on the Bayou	Caleb	TV Movie
2014–15	Extant	Charlie Arthurs	Recurring role 20 Episodes
2014	Castle	Tobias	Episode 7.07 "Once Upon A Time in the West"
2016	Pitch	Noah Casey	2 episodes
2018	Hell's Kitchen	Himself	Guest diner; Episode: "Trying to Pasta Test"
2018	The Christmas Contract	Himself/Musical guest	Lifetime Movie-Reunited with One Tree Hill co-stars
2019	A Christmas Wish	Wyatt	Lifetime Movie
2022	When Christmas Was Young	Luke Dawson	CBS TV Movie

== Discography ==
=== Albums ===
Title	Album details	Peak chart positions				Sales	Certifications
Title	Album details	US	CAN	Heatseekers	Internet	Sales	Certifications
Tyler Hilton	Released: 2000; Label: Independent; Format: CD	—	—	12	—	—	—
The Tracks of Tyler Hilton	Released: September 28, 2004; Label: Maverick Records; Format: CD, DL	124	—	15	12	US: ≈ 100,000	—
Forget the Storm	Released: April 3, 2012; Label: Hooptie Tune Records; Format: CD, DL	189	—	2	—	—	—
Indian Summer	Released: October 14, 2014; Label: Hooptie Tune Records; Format: CD, DL	—	—	19	—	—	—
City on Fire	Released: January 18, 2019; Label: Hooptie Tune Records; Format: CD, DL	—	—	19	—	—	—
My Old Ass motion picture soundtrack (with Jaco Caraco)	Released: December 6, 2024; Label: Amazon Content Services; Format: DL	—	—	—	—	—	—
Well Well Well (with Bethany Joy Lenz)	Released: November 7, 2025; Label: Hooptie Tune Records; Format: DL	—	—	—	—	—	—
"—" denotes a release that did not chart.

=== EPs ===
- Better on Beachwood (May 22, 2009)
- Ladies & Gentlemen (April 20, 2010)
- No Land's Man (July 23, 2024)

=== Music videos ===
Year	Title	Director
2004	"When It Comes"	Nick Spanos
2004	"When It Comes"	Adam Pollina
2004	"When It Comes"	Charles Mehling
2005	"How Love Should Be"	Tyler Hilton
2007	"You'll Ask for Me"	Brad Belanger
2007	"Teardrops on My Guitar"	
2010	"This World Will Turn Your Way"	
