= McAllister Olivarius =

International law firm

- Headquarters: London, New York
- Major practice areas: civil litigation, employment, discrimination, sexual abuse, higher education, online reputation, family law, corporate and commercial, business law
- Key people: Ann Olivarius, Jef McAllister
- Date founded: 1996
- Founder: Ann Olivarius
- Website: mcolaw.com

McAllister Olivarius is an international law firm dual-headquartered in London and New York. It specializes in civil litigation and plaintiff work, particularly in education and employment law.

Founded in 1996, McAllister Olivarius is one of the only feminist-run and managed law firms in the world. As of 2022, women represented 75% of the firm's full time legal staff. The firm is currently led by Dr. Ann Olivarius, Chair of the Executive Committee and Dr. Jef McAllister, Managing Partner.

The firm is best known for representing plaintiffs in discrimination lawsuits against large institutions, including Mount Sinai Health System, the University of Rochester, UCLA, the University of Illinois, the University of Oxford, the University of Warwick, and Celebrity Cruises, as well as for prominent individuals such as Chrissy Chambers.

McAllister Olivarius lawyers, working through their former separate brand AO Advocates, are also known for representing victims of sex abuse and historic child sex abuse. They have successfully pursued claims against established religious bodies including the Catholic Church, Jehovah's Witnesses, certain sects of Buddhists and Hindus, and ultra-Orthodox or Haredi Judaism, and against a number of care homes and schools.

== Notable Cases ==
=== University of Rochester ===
In March 2020, McAllister Olivarius settled a $9.4 million on behalf of nine former professors and students for alleged retaliation by the university after they filed sexual misconduct claims against Professor T. Florian Jaeger. This case was described as "high-profile" lawsuit "closely watched by other institutions of higher educations" by Science. In December 2017, Celeste Kidd and Jessica Cantlon, plaintiffs in the case, were named as "Persons of the Year" by TIME Magazine as part of its cover story on the MeToo movement.

=== UCLA ===
In 2016, the firm settled a case brought against UCLA by two female graduate students after the university had allowed history professor Gabriel Piterberg, who they had accused of sexual harassment, to return to campus. McAllister Olivarius showed that the university had failed to follow proper procedures in handling the complaint and received a settlement for the plaintiffs.

=== Cases against religious institutions ===
AO Advocates, a sister firm which is now fully part of McAllister Olivarius, brought the UK's first successful civil case against the Jehovah's Witnesses, winning compensation for a woman who claimed the religion's elders failed to protect her from sex abuse carried out by a pedophile. The firm has also represented a former Buddhist nun in her sexual assault claims against the 17th Karmapa Ogyen Trinley Dorje, a revered leader of Tibetan Buddhism.

=== Revenge Porn ===
In the first civil case of its kind to be brought in England and Wales, McAllister Olivarius won "landmark" damages for YouTube star Chrissy Chambers after her former partner uploaded revenge pornography videos of her to the internet. The firm has since built a revenge porn and intimate image abuse practice, and its attorneys are often quoted in the press on cyber-abuse and speak at events.

=== Manders v Royal Borough of Windsor and Maidenhead ===
In 2019, McAllister Olivarius won a victory for Reena and Sandeep Mander, a British-born couple of Sikh heritage who had been deemed "unsuitable" potential adopters by a UK adoption service due to their "Indian background." The case resulted in the Manders being awarded £120,000 in damages and led to a review of how other local councils handle adoptions.

=== Warwick "Rape Chat" case ===
After it emerged that male students at the University of Warwick had used a Facebook chat group to exchange rape threats relating to fellow female students, and the University's investigation was shown to be seriously inadequate, McAllister Olivarius sued for discrimination and negligence.

=== Impact on legislation ===
In 2020, the firm partnered with The 1752 Group, a British research and consultancy organization dedicated to ending staff sexual harassment and abuse in higher education. Together, they released a guide in 2020 on "Sector Guidance to Address Staff Sexual Misconduct In UK Higher Education."

The firm was cited in the 2021 UK Law Commission report on legal reforms to address intimate image abuse. The firm also The firm also assisted Baroness Uddin, Member of the House of Lords, in passing the 2021 UK Domestic Abuse Act.

Attorneys from the firm have appeared in the news advocating for legal reforms and better enforcement of Title IX and its equivalent law in the UK, the Equality Act 2010.

In an ongoing case, the firm brought suit against the University of Illinois on behalf of two Chinese students for "ignoring their claims of sexual abuse and subjecting them to trafficking."

The firm's founder, Dr. Ann Olivarius, was a plaintiff in Alexander v. Yale, the first case to hold that universities had a legal duty to combat sexual harassment under Title IX of the Education Amendments of 1972.
