= Zooey Magazine =

American fashion and lifestyle magazine

- August/September 2012 cover of Zooey
- Editor-in-Chief: Lucia Tran
- Categories: Fashion
- Frequency: Quarterly
- Founded: 2010
- Final issue: 2015
- Country: United States
- Based in: Los Angeles
- Website: zooeymagazine.com

Zooey Magazine was a boutique quarterly United States–based women's fashion and lifestyle magazine, with an emphasis on simple living. The magazine began its printed publication in 2010, having been created in 2008 by the then 14-year-old Lucia Tran. It folded in 2015.

== History ==
Editor-in-chief and CEO of Zooey Magazine Lucia Tran established an online magazine in 2008, and then converted the site to a print publication in 2010. Lucia based the magazine on the mission of empowering women through entertainment, which is why she named the publication Zooey, after the character Zooey Glass from J.D. Salinger's novel Franny and Zooey, who is uplifting, smart, and very capable.

=== Inspiration ===
Zooey Magazine is inspired by magazines including Interview, Bust, W, Frankie, Kinfolk, and Lula Magazine.

=== Past cover models ===
- Issue 21: Kind Campaign
- Issue 20: Krysten Ritter
- Winter 2013: Kat Dennings
- Fall 2013: Sara Bareilles
- Summer 2013: Emma Chapman and Elsie Larson of ABeautifulMess.com blog
- Spring 2013: Mary Elizabeth Winstead
- October/November 2012: Nikki Reed
- August/September 2012: Kristen Bell
- June/July 2012: Julianne Hough
- April/May 2012: Anna Paquin
- February/March 2012: Kaley Cuoco
- December/January 2011: Emmy Rossum
- October/November 2011: Anna Kendrick
- August/September 2011: Jennifer Love Hewitt
- June/July 2011: Sophia Bush
- April/May 2011: Ashley Tisdale
- February/March 2011: Aly Michalka
- December/January 2011: Jackson Rathbone and Victoria Justice
- October 2010: Jessica Lowndes
- September 2010: Lindsey Shaw

== Editor-in-chief ==
Lucia Tran (born May 12, 1993), an English major at UCLA who graduated in 2015, created the magazine when she was 14 years old. Lucia has been noted to have enjoyed reading magazines at an early age, sparking her interest in joining the magazine industry in later years - which led her to start her online magazine in 2008, and later launching the print publication in 2010 when she was a senior in high school.

== Content ==
Zooey featured celebrities, fashion, art, human-interest stories, and photography with an independent ("indie") perspective while catering to an audience pursuing simple living.
