= 2027 Super Netball season =

- League: Super Netball
- Sport: Netball
- Duration: 10 April 2027 – 31 July 2027 or 1 August 2027 (TBC)
- Teams: 8
- TV partner(s): Channel Nine and 9Gem
- Streaming partner(s): 9Now and Stan Sport

Seasons
- ← 2026 2028 →

The 2027 Super Netball season is the eleventh season of the premier netball league in Australia. The season will commence on Saturday 10 April and will conclude with the Grand Final on the weekend of Saturday 31 July or Sunday 1 August. The defending champions are the Adelaide Thunderbirds.

This season will be the first to fall under Netball Australia's new five-year broadcast deal with the Nine Network. At least two matches per round of the home-and-away season, plus all finals matches, will be broadcast on Channel Nine or 9Gem, with all matches of the season streaming on both 9Now and Stan Sport. Nine previously held the broadcast rights for the league from 2017 until 2021.

This will also be the first season since the league's creation not to be played under the Suncorp Super Netball name, as the Suncorp Group did not renew their sponsorship of Netball Australia and the league after their deal expired at the end of 2026.

== Team Lists ==
Team	Home Court(s)	Coach	Attack	Midcourt	Defence	Nominated Athlete
Adelaide Thunderbirds	Adelaide Entertainment Centre	Tania Obst	(South Africa) Elmeré van der Berg (Australia) Lauren Frew (Australia) Kayla Graham	(Australia) Georgie Horjus (New Zealand) Kate Heffernan (Australia) Sophie Casey (Australia) Jazmin McKay	(Jamaica) Latanya Wilson (South Africa) Sanmarie Visser (Jamaica) Shamera Sterling-Humphrey	TBA
Melbourne Mavericks	John Cain Arena	Gerard Murphy	(Jamaica) Shimona Nelson (Australia) Reilley Batcheldor (Australia) Sacha McDonald	(Australia) Zara Walters (Australia) Tyler Orr (Australia) Jamie-Lee Price (Australia) Amy Parmenter	(Australia) Kim Brown (Australia) Jessie Grenvold (Australia) Tara Hinchliffe	TBA
Melbourne Vixens	John Cain Arena	Di Honey	(Australia) Sophie Garbin (New Zealand) Amelia Walmsley (Australia) Kiera Austin	(Australia) Hannah Mundy (Australia) Tayla Williams (Australia) Kate Moloney (New Zealand) Mila Reuelu-Buchanan	(Australia) Jo Weston (New Zealand) Carys Stythe (Australia) Ash Ervin	TBA
NSW Swifts	Ken Rosewall Arena	Dylan Nexhip	(Uganda) Mary Cholhok (England) Helen Housby (Australia) Grace Whyte	(Australia) Paige Hadley (Australia) Jordan Cransberg (Australia) Tayla Fraser (Australia) Lucy Voyvodic	(Australia) Matilda Garrett (Australia) Sarah Klau (Australia) Rudi Ellis	TBA
Queensland Firebirds	Nissan Arena	Kiri Wills	(Australia) Cara Koenen (New Zealand) Te Paea Selby-Rickit (Australia) Lily Graham	(Australia) Lara Dunkley (New Zealand) Kimiora Poi (Australia) Macy Gardner	(Australia) Ruby Bakewell-Doran (Australia) Tabitha Packer (New Zealand) Kelly Jackson (Australia) Isabelle Shearer	TBA
Sunshine Coast Lightning	UniSC Arena	Belinda Reynolds	(Australia) Donnell Wallam (New Zealand) Georgia Heffernan (Australia) Olivia Wilkinson	(Australia) Liz Watson (Australia) Leesa Mi Mi (Australia) Jess Anstiss (Australia) Ava Black	(New Zealand) Karin Burger (Australia) Courtney Bruce (Australia) Maggie Caris	TBA
Sydney Sirens	Quaycentre; Ken Rosewall Arena; WIN Entertainment Centre	Nerida Stewart	(New Zealand) Grace Nweke (Australia) Matisse Letherbarrow (Australia) Sophie Dwyer	(Australia) Hope White (New Zealand) Claire O'Brien (Australia) Molly Jovic (Australia) Amy Sligar	(Jamaica) Jodi-Ann Ward (Australia) Erin O'Brien (Australia) Teigan O'Shannassy	TBA
West Coast Fever	RAC Arena	Dan Ryan	(Jamaica) Jhaniele Fowler-Nembhard (New Zealand) Ameliaranne Ekenasio (Jamaica) Shanice Beckford	(Australia) Alice Teague-Neeld (Australia) Zoe Cransberg (New Zealand) Maddy Gordon	(England) Fran Williams (Australia) Sunday Aryang (Jamaica) Kadie-Ann Dehaney (Australia) Ruth Aryang	TBA

== Contracted Signings ==
Important dates in relation to player signings for the 2027 season are:

- Monday 4 August 2026 to Sunday 16 August 2026: Current players can be re-contracted by their 2026 club on contracts of up to 5 years (until 2031). Also during this period, clubs can make non-binding letters of offer or unofficial verbal agreements with players from other Super Netball clubs and non-SN players.
- Monday 17 August 2026 to Friday 28 August 2026: Clubs can sign any player from other Super Netball clubs and non-SN players on contracts of up to 5 years (until 2031).
- Sunday 29 August 2026 to four weeks prior to the first game of the season: Training partners and the Nominated Athlete can be signed by clubs on a one-year contract.

=== Arrivals ===
The following table is a list of players who moved clubs within/moved leagues into Super Netball, or were elevated to a permanent position during the signing window. It does not include players who were re-signed by their original Super Netball clubs. As the Sydney Sirens is the continuation of the GIANTS Netball license, players who played for GIANTS in 2026 and will play for the Sirens in 2027 are not included in this table.

Name	2026	2027	Date	Ref
(Australia) Zara Walters	(Australia) Melbourne Vixens	Melbourne Mavericks	17 August	
(New Zealand) Ameliaranne Ekenasio	(New Zealand) Central Pulse	West Coast Fever	18 August	
(Australia) Olivia Wilkinson	(Australia) West Coast Fever	Sunshine Coast Lightning	19 August	
(Australia) Jazmin McKay	(Australia) Adelaide Thunderbirds (Training partner)	Adelaide Thunderbirds	20 August	
(New Zealand) Georgia Heffernan	(New Zealand) Southern Steel	Sunshine Coast Lightning	20 August	
(Australia) Jess Anstiss	(Australia) West Coast Fever	Sunshine Coast Lightning	20 August	
(New Zealand) Maddy Gordon	(Australia) Queensland Firebirds	West Coast Fever	20 August	
(Australia) Cara Koenen	(Australia) Sunshine Coast Lightning	Queensland Firebirds	21 August	
(Australia) Maggie Caris	(Australia) Melbourne Vixens	Sunshine Coast Lightning	21 August	
(Australia) Rudi Ellis	(Australia) Melbourne Vixens	NSW Swifts	22 August	
(Australia) Lucy Voyvodic	(Australia) Adelaide Thunderbirds (Nominated Athlete)	NSW Swifts	23 August	
(Australia) Tyler Orr	(England) London Pulse	Melbourne Mavericks	24 August	
(Australia) Ash Ervin	(Australia) Sunshine Coast Lightning	Melbourne Vixens	24 August	
(Uganda) Mary Cholhok	(Australia) Queensland Firebirds	NSW Swifts	24 August	
(Australia) Tabitha Packer	(Australia) Adelaide Thunderbirds (Training partner)	Queensland Firebirds	24 August	
(South Africa) Sanmarie Visser	(England) Leeds Rhinos	Adelaide Thunderbirds	25 August	
(New Zealand) Carys Stythe	(New Zealand) Southern Steel	Melbourne Vixens	25 August	
(Australia) Tayla Williams	(Australia) Adelaide Thunderbirds	Melbourne Vixens	25 August	
(Australia) Jordan Cransberg	(Australia) West Coast Fever	NSW Swifts	25 August	
(New Zealand) Kimiora Poi	(New Zealand) Southern Steel	Queensland Firebirds	25 August	
(Australia) Lily Graham	(Australia) Melbourne Vixens	Queensland Firebirds	25 August	
(Australia) Molly Jovic	(Australia) Melbourne Mavericks	Sydney Sirens	25 August	
(Australia) Matilda Garrett	(Australia) Adelaide Thunderbirds	NSW Swifts	26 August	
(New Zealand) Grace Nweke	(Australia) NSW Swifts	Sydney Sirens	26 August	
(Jamaica) Shanice Beckford	(Jamaica) Manchester Supers (Jamaica) Tivoli A	West Coast Fever	26 August	
(New Zealand) Amelia Walmsley	(New Zealand) Northern Stars	Melbourne Vixens	27 August	
(New Zealand) Mila Reuelu-Buchanan	(New Zealand) Northern Stars	Melbourne Vixens	27 August	
(New Zealand) Claire O'Brien	(New Zealand) Northern Stars	Sydney Sirens	29 August	
(Australia) Teigan O'Shannassy	(Australia) NSW Swifts	Sydney Sirens	30 August	

=== Departures ===
The following table is a list of players who were contracted in the 2026 season, but were not signed by any Super Netball club for 2027. This includes players that retired at the end of the 2026 season.

Name	2026	2027	Date	Ref
(New Zealand) Jane Watson	GIANTS Netball	Retirement	9 June	
(Jamaica) Romelda Aiken-George	West Coast Fever	Retirement	1 July	N/A
(England) Imogen Allison	Queensland Firebirds	(England) Nottingham Forest Netball (Netball Super League)	3 July	
(Australia) Maddie Hay	Melbourne Mavericks	Retirement	5 July	
(Tonga) Uneeq Palavi	Melbourne Mavericks	(England) London Mavericks (Netball Super League)	8 July	
(Australia) Gabrielle Sinclair	Sunshine Coast Lightning	Retirement	13 August	
(Australia) Sharni Lambden	NSW Swifts	Unattached	15 August	
(New Zealand) Whitney Souness	GIANTS Netball	Unattached	17 August	N/A
(England) Sasha Glasgow	West Coast Fever	(England) Birmingham Panthers (Netball Super League)	18 August	
(Australia) Emily Moore	Queensland Firebirds	Unattached	19 August	
(Australia) Mahalia Cassidy	Sunshine Coast Lightning	Retirement	19 August	
(Australia) Casey Adamson	GIANTS Netball	Unattached	20 August	
(Australia) Lucy Austin	GIANTS Netball	(Australia) Melbourne Mavericks (Training partner)	20 August	
(Australia) Maddy Proud	NSW Swifts	Retirement	20 August	
(Australia) Maddy Turner	NSW Swifts	Retirement	21 August	
(Australia) Emily Mannix	Melbourne Vixens	Retirement	23 August	
(Australia) Kate Eddy	Melbourne Vixens	(Australia) Melbourne Mavericks (Training partner)	24 August	

== Regular season ==
- Source: Click here (all times are in local time)

=== Round 1 ===
Saturday 10 April	Melbourne Vixens	v	Melbourne Mavericks	John Cain Arena
3:00pm AEST

Saturday 10 April	NSW Swifts	v	Queensland Firebirds	Ken Rosewall Arena
7:00pm AEST

Sunday 11 April	Sunshine Coast Lightning	v	West Coast Fever	UniSC Arena
1:00pm AEST

Sunday 11 April	Sydney Sirens	v	Adelaide Thunderbirds	Quaycentre
3:00pm AEST

=== Round 2 ===
Saturday 17 April	Adelaide Thunderbirds	v	NSW Swifts	Adelaide Entertainment Centre
2:30pm ACST

Saturday 17 April	Queensland Firebirds	v	Sunshine Coast Lightning	Nissan Arena
7:00pm AEST

Sunday 18 April	Melbourne Vixens	v	Sydney Sirens	John Cain Arena
1:00pm AEST

Sunday 18 April	West Coast Fever	v	Melbourne Mavericks	RAC Arena
1:00pm AWST

=== Round 3 ===
Saturday 24 April	Sydney Sirens	v	Queensland Firebirds	Quaycentre
3:00pm AEST

Saturday 24 April	Melbourne Mavericks	v	Adelaide Thunderbirds	John Cain Arena
7:00pm AEST

Sunday 25 April	Sunshine Coast Lightning	v	Melbourne Vixens	UniSC Arena
1:00pm AEST

Sunday 25 April	West Coast Fever	v	NSW Swifts	RAC Arena
1:00pm AWST

=== Round 4 ===
Saturday 1 May	Queensland Firebirds	v	West Coast Fever	Nissan Arena
3:00pm AEST

Saturday 1 May	Adelaide Thunderbirds	v	Melbourne Vixens	Adelaide Entertainment Centre
6:30pm ACST

Sunday 2 May	NSW Swifts	v	Melbourne Mavericks	Ken Rosewall Arena
1:00pm AEST

Sunday 2 May	Sunshine Coast Lightning	v	Sydney Sirens	UniSC Arena
3:00pm AEST

=== Round 5 ===
Saturday 8 May	Sydney Sirens	v	West Coast Fever	Quaycentre
3:00pm AEST

Saturday 8 May	Melbourne Mavericks	v	Sunshine Coast Lightning	John Cain Arena
7:00pm AEST

Sunday 9 May	Queensland Firebirds	v	Adelaide Thunderbirds	Nissan Arena
1:00pm AEST

Sunday 9 May	Melbourne Vixens	v	NSW Swifts	John Cain Arena
3:00pm AEST

=== Round 6 ===
Saturday 15 May	Melbourne Mavericks	v	Queensland Firebirds	TBC
3:00pm AEST

Saturday 15 May	West Coast Fever	v	Melbourne Vixens	RAC Arena
5:00pm AWST

Sunday 16 May	NSW Swifts	v	Sydney Sirens	Ken Rosewall Arena
1:00pm AEST

Sunday 16 May	Adelaide Thunderbirds	v	Sunshine Coast Lightning	Adelaide Entertainment Centre
2:30pm ACST

=== Round 7 ===
Saturday 22 May	Sunshine Coast Lightning	v	NSW Swifts	UniSC Arena
3:00pm AEST

Saturday 22 May	Melbourne Vixens	v	Queensland Firebirds	John Cain Arena
7:00pm AEST

Sunday 23 May	Adelaide Thunderbirds	v	West Coast Fever	Adelaide Entertainment Centre
12:30pm ACST

Sunday 23 May	Sydney Sirens	v	Melbourne Mavericks	WIN Entertainment Centre
3:00pm AEST

=== Round 8 ===
Saturday 29 May	NSW Swifts	v	Adelaide Thunderbirds	Ken Rosewall Arena
3:00pm AEST

Saturday 29 May	West Coast Fever	v	Sunshine Coast Lightning	RAC Arena
5:00pm AWST

Sunday 30 May	Melbourne Mavericks	v	Melbourne Vixens	John Cain Arena
1:00pm AEST

Sunday 30 May	Queensland Firebirds	v	Sydney Sirens	Nissan Arena
3:00pm AEST

=== Round 9 ===
Saturday 5 June	Sydney Sirens	v	Melbourne Vixens	Quaycentre
3:00pm AEST

Saturday 5 June	NSW Swifts	v	West Coast Fever	Ken Rosewall Arena
7:00pm AEST

Sunday 6 June	Sunshine Coast Lightning	v	Queensland Firebirds	TBC
1:00pm AEST

Sunday 6 June	Adelaide Thunderbirds	v	Melbourne Mavericks	Adelaide Entertainment Centre
2:30pm ACST

=== Round 10 ===
Saturday 12 June	Melbourne Vixens	v	Adelaide Thunderbirds	John Cain Arena
3:00pm AEST

Saturday 12 June	Sydney Sirens	v	Sunshine Coast Lightning	Quaycentre
7:00pm AEST

Sunday 13 June	Melbourne Mavericks	v	West Coast Fever	John Cain Arena
1:00pm AEST

Sunday 13 June	Queensland Firebirds	v	NSW Swifts	Nissan Arena
3:00pm AEST

=== Round 11 ===
Saturday 19 June	Melbourne Mavericks	v	NSW Swifts	John Cain Arena
3:00pm AEST

Saturday 19 June	Adelaide Thunderbirds	v	Sydney Sirens	Adelaide Entertainment Centre
6:30pm ACST

Sunday 20 June	Melbourne Vixens	v	Sunshine Coast Lightning	John Cain Arena
1:00pm AEST

Sunday 20 June	West Coast Fever	v	Queensland Firebirds	RAC Arena
1:00pm AWST

=== Round 12 ===
Saturday 26 June	Queensland Firebirds	v	Melbourne Mavericks	Nissan Arena
3:00pm AEST

Saturday 26 June	West Coast Fever	v	Sydney Sirens	RAC Arena
5:00pm AWST

Sunday 27 June	NSW Swifts	v	Melbourne Vixens	Ken Rosewall Arena
1:00pm AEST

Sunday 27 June	Sunshine Coast Lightning	v	Adelaide Thunderbirds	UniSC Arena
3:00pm AEST

=== Round 13 ===
Saturday 3 July	Sunshine Coast Lightning	v	Melbourne Mavericks	UniSC Arena
3:00pm AEST

Saturday 3 July	Sydney Sirens	v	NSW Swifts	Ken Rosewall Arena
7:00pm AEST

Sunday 4 July	Melbourne Vixens	v	West Coast Fever	John Cain Arena
1:00pm AEST

Sunday 4 July	Adelaide Thunderbirds	v	Queensland Firebirds	Adelaide Entertainment Centre
2:30pm ACST

=== Round 14 ===
Saturday 10 July	Queensland Firebirds	v	Melbourne Vixens	Nissan Arena
3:00pm AEST

Saturday 10 July	NSW Swifts	v	Sunshine Coast Lightning	Ken Rosewall Arena
7:00pm AEST

Sunday 11 July	Melbourne Mavericks	v	Sydney Sirens	John Cain Arena
1:00pm AEST

Sunday 11 July	West Coast Fever	v	Adelaide Thunderbirds	RAC Arena
1:00pm AWST

== Ladder ==
2027 Super Netball ladder
Pos	Team	P	W	D	L	GF	GA	%	PTS
1	Adelaide Thunderbirds	0	0	0	0	0	0	0	0
2	Melbourne Mavericks	0	0	0	0	0	0	0	0
3	Melbourne Vixens	0	0	0	0	0	0	0	0
4	NSW Swifts	0	0	0	0	0	0	0	0
5	Queensland Firebirds	0	0	0	0	0	0	0	0
6	Sunshine Coast Lightning	0	0	0	0	0	0	0	0
7	Sydney Sirens	0	0	0	0	0	0	0	0
8	West Coast Fever	0	0	0	0	0	0	0	0
Last updated: 22 October 2026 — Source
