= Smith Journal =

- Cover of the September 9, 2015, issue
- Editor: Chris Harrigan
- Former editors: Nadia Saccardo
- Categories: Men, Culture, Art, Design, Photography, Style, Fashion,
- Frequency: Quarterly
- Publisher: Morrison Media
- Total circulation: 32,000
- Founded: 2011
- Final issue: December 2019
- Country: Australia
- Based in: Melbourne
- Language: English
- Website: smithjournal.com.au

Smith Journal was a quarterly Australian magazine based in Melbourne, Australia founded in 2011 that ceased publication in December 2019. The publication focused on history, photography, art, and design, but also included articles on architecture, fashion, science, DIY, adventure, and literature.

The magazine's title is derived from the traditional artisans and craftsmen – such as wordsmiths or blacksmiths – who embody the down-to-earth quality the magazine attempted to emulate. It was designed to attract readers interested in "real people doing real things, guys that are making stuff, creative thinkers, adventurers, whatever."

Smith Journal was published by Frankie Press, creators of popular Australian magazine frankie.

== History and profile ==
Smith Journal was founded by frankie press editors-at-large Rick Bannister and Louise Bannister as a men’s magazine in the same vein as frankie. The magazine was lauded for sharing the same "inquisitive nature, intelligent copy and compelling stories" as frankie.

Frankie Press editor-at-Large Louise Bannister stated that frankie and Smith Journal were "from the same family – lots of white space…but the treatment of pictures and text is a little different." Smith Journal was initially designed by frankie magazine's Creative Director, Lara Burke, with additional input from frankie's editor, Jo Walker and Senior Contributor, Benjamin Walker. However, Bannister was quick to point out that despite the similarities, "Smith is its own thing."

When the magazine launched in September 2011, men's magazines were declining significantly in sales and reader numbers. For example, FHM had posted a 20% drop from 2010 to 2011 to reach a record low of 40,000 circulated copies in Australia, and Zoo Weekly had dropped 18% to 83,000 circulated copies. Other men's titles such as Alpha, Sport & Style, and Ralph all folded in the same span of time.

In response to the decision to launch a new men's magazine when a large number of others were closing, then editorial director Louise Bannister suggested Smith Journal was not intended to appeal to a mass audience, but instead to a smaller group of people interested in "something they can't get on the internet."

The first issue of Smith Journal was published on 5 September 2011. Frankie Press circulated 20,000 copies of the first issue which contained 140 pages. Similarly to frankie, the magazine was printed on premium matte paper stock, and marketed as a "bespoke" title suitable as both a casual read and coffee table magazine. The magazine was initially published biannually, but adopted a quarterly publishing schedule following its positive reception.

Smith Journal's publisher Morrison Media moved production of its titles to Melbourne in February 2014 when it closed its Queensland-based offices. In November that year, Morrison Media was acquired by Pacific Star Network for A$10m.

== Closure ==
In September 2018, Smith Journal publisher Morrison Media was purchased by Australian magazine publisher Nextmedia from Pacific Star Network, as part of a A$2.4 million deal to acquire the magazine's sister publication frankie.

Smith Journal continued publication for another year before it was closed down. "It wasn’t a problem with readership, it was a problem with advertising revenue," editor Chris Harrigan said in 2019. "How you can model your business to provide people with the stories that they want: I mean, that sounds like it should be easy enough to do, but for whatever reason… It’s no surprise to anyone that publishing is not the healthiest it’s ever been, and it hasn’t been in a decade."

== Content ==
The magazine's niche content and minimalistic design were a direct response to the salacious, populist "lad mags" such as FHM and Zoo Weekly that dominated the men's magazine market at the time of Smith Journal's launch. Other magazines targeted to men had either a very broad audience such as Men's Health, or were hobby-specific titles dedicated to a single topic.

Instead of attempting to engage as many readers as possible through glossy pages filled with current-events topics, the editors of Smith Journal felt that there was a "gap in the market for guys who felt that their magazines hadn't grown or changed with them." According to founding editor Nadia Saccardo, Smith Journal was not created specifically for men, but was instead focused on "unexpected, accessible storytelling coupled with great photography and illustration."

"People [have] unique pursuits that become quite singular, and tend to consume them in ways, and I felt our job was to take these very niche fields and explain them to people who wouldn’t otherwise rub up against them," editor Chris Harrigan said in 2019.

The magazine used plentiful white space and full-page photography and illustration. The front section, 'Smith Stuff', compiled "short tit bits of weird, wonderful and why". Each issue also included a tear-out poster of an illustration or diagram. For example, Volume 25 featured an illustrated diagram of the 2018 lunar calendar, and Volume 18 included a twenty-sided icosahedron globe.

Thematically, Smith Journal "moves where it will and that really is anywhere; columns from aging rock-stars, photo essays, features on primitive skills practitioners and investigations into international (bee) hive heists." For instance, Volume 25 profiled photographer Daniel George, whose portfolio consists of household items used for target practice; an article discussing the cultural re-evaluation of 1980s hair metal music; and an interview with former NASA scientist Robert Lang who now designs origami.

Previous issues included interviews with American musician Henry Rollins, and professional safe-cracker Jeff Sitar, an historical article on Soviet rocket architect Galina Balashova, and Brazil's illegal hot air balloon subculture.

Designer Christopher Roosen, a loyal reader who owned all 33 issues, eulogised Smith Journal in 2019: "Unashamedly thick and full of long-form articles sandwiched between heavy card covers, it covered an eclectic range of topics from the past, present and future, inclusive of all types of people, places, things and ideas."

== Readership ==
Smith Journal's readers were predominantly male; however in 2018, 30% of its readers were female. The magazine's 2018 media kit stated that 58% of its readers were aged between 25 and 44, and that 70% were university educated or were currently studying.

Former editor Nadia Saccardo described the magazine's reader as curious and open-minded and that the content was designed to attract readers "who feel like they have been ignored, or would not traditionally pick up magazines." Editor-at-Large Rick Bannister elaborated on this statement by describing the magazine's average reader as someone who is creative and interested in reviving old traditions such as "brewing, or making furniture, or restoring bikes."

Besides the quarterly issue, the magazine also published content on its website smithjournal.com.au. The website published selected articles from the print magazine, plus weekly blog posts that covered a wider range of subjects and topics than the magazine. In 2018 the website received a six-month average of 19,900 unique visitors, and 41,150+ average pageviews per month. Back issues and digital editions of Smith Journal were also sold in Frankie Press's online shop.

At the time of its closure in December 2019, Smith Journal had a readership of 32,000 print distribution, 13,000 e-newsletter subscribers, over 30,000 monthly average pageviews, 15,000 unique users, and 66,800 social media fans.

== Staff ==
- Editor Chris Harrigan, previously Nadia Saccardo
- Assistant Editor Toby Fehily
- Designer Anjana Jain
- Writers Mel Campbell, Kane Daniel, Carl Dansk, Justin Heazlewood, Koren Helbig, Christopher Hollow, Bryce Howorth, Marina Kamenev, Leta Keens, Brodie Lancaster, Ben McLeay, Stephin Merritt, Andrew Mueller, Max Olijnyk, Kieran Pender, Patrick Pittman, Justin Quirk, Luke Ryan, James Shackell, Rory Taggart, Alex Warren
- Photographers Alice Aedy, Nicolas Blandin, Jeremy Bowtell, Jean-Marc Caimi, Carlos Chavarria, Chris Crerar, Elsie El-asmar, Daniel George, Mick Hutson, Charlie Kinross, Misha Petrov
- Illustrators Indigo O'Rourke, Timothy Rodgers, George Wylesol
- Notable contributors: Dave Eggers, Elizabeth Gilbert, Tim Winton

== Contributors ==
Smith Journal has had a number of notable writers contribute to the magazine's content. Pulitzer Prize-winning writer and editor Dave Eggers, author of popular novels A Hologram for the King and The Circle, contributed a personal narrative in the magazine's second issue. Elizabeth Gilbert, author of Eat, Pray, Love, has contributed an opinion piece on science and adventure. Australian writer Tim Winton had an article titled "10 Things I Believe" also published by the magazine.
