= Sydney Sirens (netball) =

Australian netball team

Sydney Sirens (Netball)
- Founded: 2026
- Based in: Sydney
- Regions: New South Wales
- Home venue: Quaycentre
- Head coach: Nerida Stewart
- Asst coach: Jen Wright
- Captain: TBA
- League: Super Netball
- 2026 placing: 8th (as GIANTS Netball)
- Website: sydneysirensnetball.com
Uniform

The Sydney Sirens are a future Australian professional netball team based in Sydney, New South Wales. They are replacing the GIANTS Netball team as the second Sydney-based franchise after the franchise was sold to the Sports Entertainment Group in August 2026.

Their inaugural season will be in 2027, when they play in Super Netball.

== History ==
=== New franchise ===
The rumoured sale of the eighth franchise owned by the Australian Football League (AFL) team Greater Western Sydney Giants, and run by Netball New South Wales in the Super Netball League, had been around since the second Melbourne-based team Collingwood Magpies folded in 2023, making way for the Melbourne Mavericks to join for the 2024 season.

The rumours were ended in August 2026 when GIANTS Netball and Netball Australia announced the licence had been sold to the Sports Entertainment Group.

=== New ownership ===
In August 2026, Sports Entertainment Group acquired the GIANTS Netball team's license. The new ownership confirmed the team's name and branding would change. By mid-August the new team's names and colours were announced.

=== Controversy ===
The name of the new franchise was met with disappointment by those associated with the Australian Women's Ice Hockey League, who stated that they felt that Sydney Sirens ice hockey team might be forced to change their name.

== Home venues ==
It was announced on October 2026 that the Sirens would be playing their home games at Quaycentre, as well as taking one game in the 2027 season to WIN Entertainment Centre in Wollongong .

== Players and Coaches ==
=== 2027 squad ===
2027 Sydney Sirens roster
Players
Coaching staff

Nat.	Name	Position(s)	DoB	Height
(Australia)	Sophie Dwyer	GA, GS	5 December 2001 (age 24)	1.83 m (6 ft 0 in)
(Australia)	Molly Jovic	C, WA	7 October 1995 (age 31)	1.71 m (5 ft 7 in)
(Australia)	Matisse Letherbarrow	GS, GA	7 January 2002 (age 24)	1.88 m (6 ft 2 in)
(New Zealand)	Grace Nweke	GS	7 February 2002 (age 24)	1.93 m (6 ft 4 in)
(New Zealand)	Claire O'Brien	WA, C	11 March 1997 (age 29)	1.73 m (5 ft 8 in)
(Australia)	Erin O'Brien	GK, GD	8 July 2003 (age 23)	1.9 m (6 ft 3 in)
(Australia)	Teigan O'Shannassy	GK, GD	14 April 1999 (age 27)	1.88 m (6 ft 2 in)
(Australia)	Amy Sligar	WD, C	13 March 2002 (age 24)	1.75 m (5 ft 9 in)
(Jamaica)	Jodi-Ann Ward	GD, WD	1 September 1994 (age 32)	1.78 m (5 ft 10 in)
(Australia)	Hope White	WA, C	19 October 2006 (age 20)	1.74 m (5 ft 9 in)

Head coach

- (Australia) Nerida Stewart

Assistant coaches

- (Australia) Jen Wright

Notes

- (c) – Captain
- (cc) – Co-captain
- (vc) – Vice-captain
- – Injury / maternity leave
- (TRP) – Temporary Replacement Player
Player profiles: Team website
Last updated: 28 August 2026

=== Club Captains ===
Captains	Years
TBA	2027-

=== Club Head Coaches ===
Coach	Years
Nerida Stewart	2027-present

=== Internationals ===
Australia

- Sophie Dwyer

New Zealand

- Grace Nweke
- Claire O'Brien

Jamaica

- Jodi-Ann Ward

== Sydney Sirens Reserves ==
The reserve team of Sydney Sirens is known as the Sirens Reserves, and previously played as the Canberra GIANTS and GIANTS Academy. This team will play in the Super Netball Reserves competition, which began in 2024, after rebranding from the Australian Netball Championships and, prior to that, the Australian Netball League.
