= Sophie Dwyer =

Australian netball player

Personal information
- Full name: Sophie Dwyer
- Born: 5 December 2001 (age 24) Sydney, New South Wales,Australia
- Height: 1.83 m (6 ft 0 in)
- School: Loreto Normanhurst

Netball career
- Playing positions: GS, GA
2020–2026	Giants Netball	90
2027-	Sydney Sirens	
Years	National team	Caps
2022–present	Australian Diamonds	18
- (Correct as of September 2, 2026)
Medal record
Netball
Representing Australia
Commonwealth Games
Bronze medal – third place	2026 Glasgow	Netball

Sophie Dwyer (born 5 December 2001) is an Australian netball player in the Suncorp Super Netball league, having previously played for Giants Netball.

In August 2026, Dwyer was named in the inaugural team for the Sydney Sirens after the eighth licence was sold to Sports Entertainment Group.

== Early life ==
Dwyer grew up in the Sydney suburb of Eastwood. She was educated at St Kevin's Primary School in Eastwood, before attending secondary school at Loreto in Normanhurst.

She first played junior netball for her primary school before joining the local club West Ryde Rovers in the Eastwood Ryde Netball Association.

== Domestic Netball ==
Dwyer debuted in the Super Netball League for the Giants in 2020, playing two matches off the bench and scoring two goals and two super shots with 100% accuracy.

With teammate Kiera Austin injuring her ACL during round 1 of the 2021 season, Dwyer was promoted to replace her and played in all 17 matches, including the grand final where the Giants lost to the NSW Swifts. She received the 2021 SSN Rising Star Award.

== International Netball ==
In 2022, Dwyer was named in the extended Diamonds squad, playing in the international series against New Zealand (Constellation Cup) and England in 2022, as well as the Quad Series, Constellation Cup, and South African series in 2023; however, she was not part of the 2022 Commonwealth Games team or the 2023 Netball World Cup team.

In 2026, Dwyer was selected into the Diamonds for the 2026 Commonwealth Games in Glasgow, where the team won the bronze medal.
