= Teigan =

Teigan can be both a feminine given name and a surname. Notable people with the name include:

- Teigan Collister (born 2000), Australian soccer player
- Teigan O'Shannassy (born 1999), Australian netball player
- Teigan Van Roosmalen (born 1991), Australian paralympic S13 swimmer
- Henry Teigan (1881–1941), American teacher and politician
