= The Narrows (film) =

- Theatrical release poster
- Directed by: François Velle
- Written by: Tatiana Blackington; Tim McLoughlin
- Produced by: Ami Armstrong; Leslie Urdang; Fran Giblin; Michael Nozik
- Starring: Kevin Zegers; Sophia Bush; Eddie Cahill; Monica Keena; Roger Rees; Michael Kelly; Anthony Fazio; Vincent D'Onofrio
- Music by: Richard Marvin
- Release date: 2008
- Country: United States
- Language: English

The Narrows is an American 2008 independent film starring Kevin Zegers, Sophia Bush, Vincent D'Onofrio, Eddie Cahill and Monica Keena.

== Plot ==
The movie is based on Tim McLoughlin's novel Heart of the Old Country, which has Mike Manadoro (Kevin Zegers) as a 19-year-old Brooklyn boy who is torn between two worlds. When Mike's photography portfolio wins him a partial scholarship to New York University, he must figure out how to balance his tight-knit Italian neighborhood roots in Bay Ridge with the opportunity to blend into the expansive, sophisticated world on the other side of the East River. Since his job at a local car service doesn't earn him enough to make up for the rest of the tuition, and his father, a retired sanitation worker on disability, refuses out of pride to support Mike's attempts for financial aid, Mike ultimately takes a job making deliveries for Tony, the local mob boss, to make up the difference.

Mike not only has to balance work with his academic assignments, he has to manage his personal relationships as well. This includes his attraction to a beautiful, cool, intellectual young woman, Kathy Popovich (Sophia Bush) he meets at NYU, with his responsibility to his longtime girlfriend Gina (Monica Keena) from the neighborhood whom he's promised to marry. The stakes grow higher as he faces consequential choices from turning his back on all he knows and pursuing a new life.

== Cast ==
- Kevin Zegers as Mike Manadoro
- Vincent D'Onofrio as Vinny Manadoro
- Sophia Bush as Kathy Popovich
- Eddie Cahill as Nicky Shades
- Monica Keena as Gina
- Roger Rees as Professor Reyerson
- Michael Kelly as Danny
- Titus Welliver as Tony

== Production ==
The Narrows was filmed in New York City between April 24 and May 30, 2007. Filming took place in several locations of the city including Astoria in Queens and Medgar Evers College in Brooklyn. Sophia Bush was reported to have been flying back and forth from her home state of California to the filming destination in New York City.

The Narrows premiered at the Toronto International Film Festival in September 2008. On March 4, 2009, it was announced that The Narrows was picked up for distribution by the new partnership of Olympus Pictures Distribution LLC (a unit of Olympus Pictures) and Cinedigm's Content and Entertainment subsidiary. It was released in over 15 major markets in the US in June 2009. The DVD came out in the fall of 2009.

== Awards ==
Vincent D'Onofrio received the Special Grand Jury Prize for Acting for his role at the 2009 Nashville Film Festival.
