= Keith Brion =

American conductor (born 1933)

Keith Brion (born July 9, 1933) is an American classical conductor and band leader.

== Biography and career ==
Keith Brion was born in Pennsylvania and is the son and only child of Kenneth (1901-1965) and Margaret (1903-1974) Brion. Brion studied music education at West Chester State University and piccolo with John C. Krell, then taught in New Jersey schools while studying for a Master's Degree in Music Education at Rutgers University. He played piccolo with the New Jersey Symphony, and founded the North Jersey Wind Symphony, of which he was music director. He was later a band educator and music supervisor in the New Jersey public schools, and Director of Bands of Yale University, where he led the Yale Band in performances at venues such as the Kennedy Center and Carnegie Hall.

In 1979, Brion founded the New Sousa Band, of which he is the music director and conductor. This band is dedicated to playing the music of John Philip Sousa and recreating the performance style of Sousa's original band; Brion also appears in the persona of Sousa, dressed as Sousa did. Brion has performed with a number of orchestras and bands, including the Stockholm Symphonic Wind Orchestra, New York City's Goldman Band, The California Wind Orchestra, and the Allentown Band. He has also performed with military bands, such as the United States Marine Band, United States Army Field Band, United States Army Band, United States Coast Guard Band and the U.S. Army Band of Europe in Heidelberg, Germany. Brion has also presented "Sousa revival concerts" with leading American orchestras, such as the Boston Pops Orchestra, the Philadelphia Orchestra and the St. Louis Symphony, Dallas Symphony Orchestra, Milwaukee Symphony Orchestra.

== Publications and recordings ==
Brion has published many editions of band music, by composers such as Charles Ives, Percy Grainger, John Philip Sousa and others. He is currently recording the complete music of Sousa for Naxos Records with London's Royal Artillery Band. This series is projected to cover 23 volumes. He has also recorded music of Sousa on the Delos label. Additionally, Brion has recorded the music of Alan Hovhaness, including one LP (1971) on the Mace label, one CD (1994) for Delos and three CDs (2005, 2010, 2018) for Naxos, the latter comprising a three-disc survey comprising most of Hovhaness's music for band and chamber works featuring wind instruments.

== Personal life ==
Brion married Larue Elder on September 6, 1955. They subsequently had three children, Randall (conductor/arranger), Laurie (violinist), and Jon Brion (multi-instrumentalist, producer, composer).

== Legal Issues ==
In 1979, Brion was named in a federal lawsuit against Yale University, Alexander v. Yale regarding sexual misconduct with students by faculty and staff at Yale. The portion of the lawsuit pertaining to Brion was eventually dismissed by the court because the student graduated and no longer attended Yale and this “mooted...claims for grievance procedures.” Brion was never charged or convicted of any criminal wrongdoing, nor is there any record of any civil judgements or settlements regarding this case on Brion's behalf.
