= Emma Chapman =

British physicist and Royal Society Research Fellow

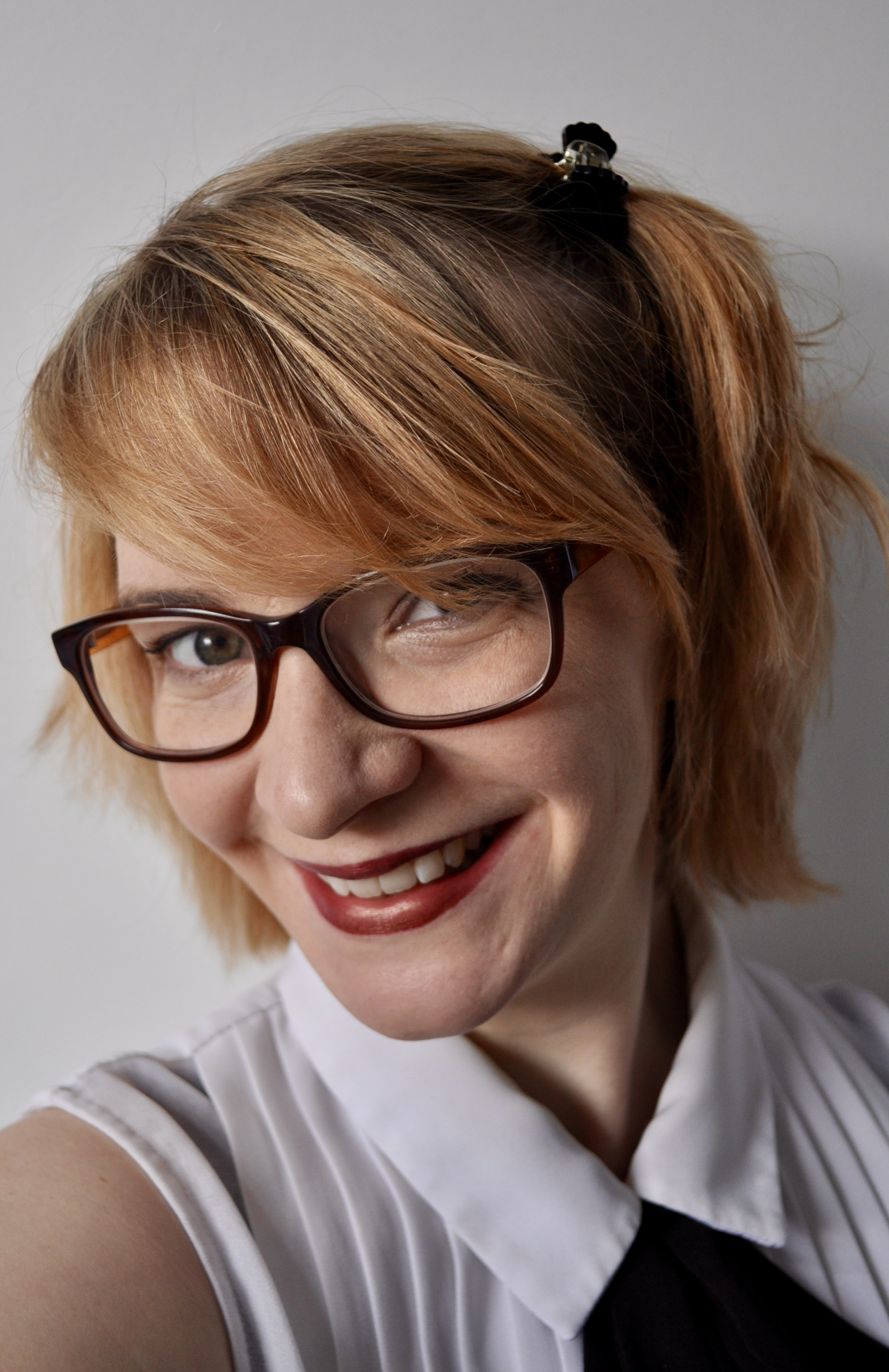
- Emma Chapman in 2018
- Born: Emma Olivia Woodfield
- Education: Durham University (MPhys); University of Nottingham (PhD)
- Known for: The 1752 Group
- Awards: The Shell and Institute of Physics Award for the Very Early Career Woman Physicist (2014); Royal Society Athena Prize (2018)
- Scientific career
- Fields: Cosmology; Astrophysics; Radio astronomy; Reionization
- Workplaces: University of Nottingham; University of Nottingham
- Thesis: Seeing the Light: Foreground Removal in the Dark and Dim Ages (2014)
- Website: https://dr-emma-chapman.com/

Emma Olivia Chapman (née Woodfield) is a British physicist and Royal Society Dorothy Hodgkin Research Fellow at University of Nottingham. Her research investigates the epoch of reionization. She won the 2018 Royal Society Athena Prize. In November 2020 Chapman published her first book, First Light: Switching on Stars at the Dawn of Time.

== Early life and education ==
Chapman achieved first class honours for a Master of Physics (MPhys) degree in Physics at Durham University in 2010. She completed her PhD, Seeing the Light: Foreground Removal in the Dark and Dim Ages, at University College London. She won the University College London Chris Skinner Department of Physics and Astronomy Thesis Prize. Chapman became concerned about PhD culture and how it impacts women.

== Research and career ==
A video by Emma Chapman, including her talking about how she became an astrophysicist and a virtual tour from the Big Bang to the present

Following her PhD, Chapman remained at University College London as a Square Kilometre Array funded postdoctoral researcher. Chapman was awarded a Royal Astronomical Society Research Fellowship in 2013. She won the Institute of Physics Early Career Woman Physicist of the Year Award in 2014. In 2018, Chapman was awarded a Dorothy Hodgkin Fellowship by the Royal Society.

Her research investigates the Epoch of Reionisation, the time in the universe when the stars began to radiate light. Chapman works with the Low-Frequency Array telescope (LOFAR).

In 2017 Chapman was highly commended in the L'Oréal-UNESCO For Women in Science Awards. She was an invited speaker at the Cheltenham Science Festival. She spoke about the first era of stars at the 2018 New Scientist Live.

Chapman brought a successful lawsuit against University College London for sexual harassment through the law firm of Ann Olivarius. She settled the case for £70,000 and then campaigned against the use of gag-orders or "non-disclosure settlements." As a result of her campaign, University College of London has abandoned non-disclosure settlements.

=== The 1752 group ===
She has spoken about bias in science at the Royal Institution, Wellcome Collection and on the BBC. Chapman is a member of The 1752 Group, a lobbying group to end staff-student sexual harassment in academia. She was a keynote speaker on the topic at the International Union of Pure and Applied Physics (IUPAP) International Conference for Women in Physics. She partnered with the National Union of Students (NUS) to conduct a survey of staff-student sexual harassment. They found that there was widespread misconduct in higher education and that institutions did not adequately support the victims.

=== Publications ===
Chapman is author of two books:

- First Light: Switching on Stars at the Dawn of Time. Bloomsbury Sigma. 2020. ISBN 978-1472962928. OCLC 1139379900.
- Radio Universe: How to Explore Space without Leaving Earth. John Murray. 2026. ISBN 978-1-5293-9897-7.

She has also written a column for The Spectator about the search for extraterrestrial intelligence.

=== Awards and honours ===
In 2018, Chapman was awarded the Royal Society Athena Prize for her work to end staff-student sexual harassment and bullying in academia.

== Personal life ==
Chapman had her first child during the last year of her PhD. She has three children.
