= The 1752 Group =

UK lobbying organisation

- Formation: 2016
- Website: https://1752group.com/

The 1752 Group is a UK-based research and lobby organisation working to end sexual misconduct in higher education.

== History ==
The Sexual Harassment in Higher Education (SHHE) Conference, the first UK university conference on staff-to-student sexual harassment, was held at Goldsmiths in December 2015. The conference prompted the organisers, who had spent £1752 on the event, to create a national organisation to identify and address the sexual misconduct of staff within UK universities. The 1752 Group was established in 2016. The Guardian newspaper have been strong supporters of the group.

== Key people ==
The 1752 Group was co-founded by several academics with experience in student unions, organisational change, consultancy and grassroots activism. These include:

- Dr. Anna Bull, a lecturer in sociology at the University of Portsmouth
- Dr. Emma Chapman, Royal Astronomical Society Research Fellow, Imperial College London
- Heidi Hasbrouch, associate director of Qualitative Research at Kantar Public
- Dr. Tiffany Page, lecturer in sociology at the University of Cambridge
- Dr. Chryssa Sdrolia, Deputy Curriculum Leader for KS5 English

Members of the 1752 Group have given several interviews discussing their priorities. Speaking to the LSE, Dr Page emphasised the need to research and action "it's critical to situate this as being about equal access to education, which comes under the Equality Act 2010 and under institutional responsibilities. Universities need to safeguard and protect their students, but also ensure that they have equal access to resources. Staff sexual misconduct can lead to students interrupting or dropping out of their studies, or having to avoid any situation where they have to be in the same space as that staff member, which affects their studies and access in multiple ways". Dr Anna Bull is running a HEFCE funded project examining university policies, involving focus groups who have experienced staff sexual misconduct.

In 2020, the 1752 Group and Ann Olivarius's law firm, McAllister Olivarius, released a report, "Sector Guidance to Address Staff Sexual Misconduct in UK Higher Education."

== Research ==
Sexual misconduct by academic staff is under-researched worldwide, and was last researched in the UK in 1998. The 1752 Group are committed to developing research on sexual misconduct in higher education, and implementing UK-wide policy to protect students. Their strategic priorities include:

- Implementing a national code of conduct that clarifies professional boundaries
- Develop a reporting process for sexual misconduct
- Establish an independent national office for sexual misconduct advocacy and support
- Ensure all institutions record data and make publicly available reports on all allegations
- Address the long-term impact of staff sexual misconduct on those who experience it
- Implement comprehensive sector-wide and institution-level cultural change

In 2011, the NUS' Women's Campaign published Hidden Marks, which found "students who had been subjected to a less serious sexual assault were least likely (< 2 %) to report either to the police or to the institution". The 1752 Group partnered with the National Union of Students to launch the first UK survey into staff sexual misconduct in higher education. The report was published in April 2018. It found that a third of universities have no policy on staff-student relationships, and as a result, less than 10% of students who experienced sexual harassment report the behaviour to their institutions.
