= New Jersey Naval Museum =

American museum

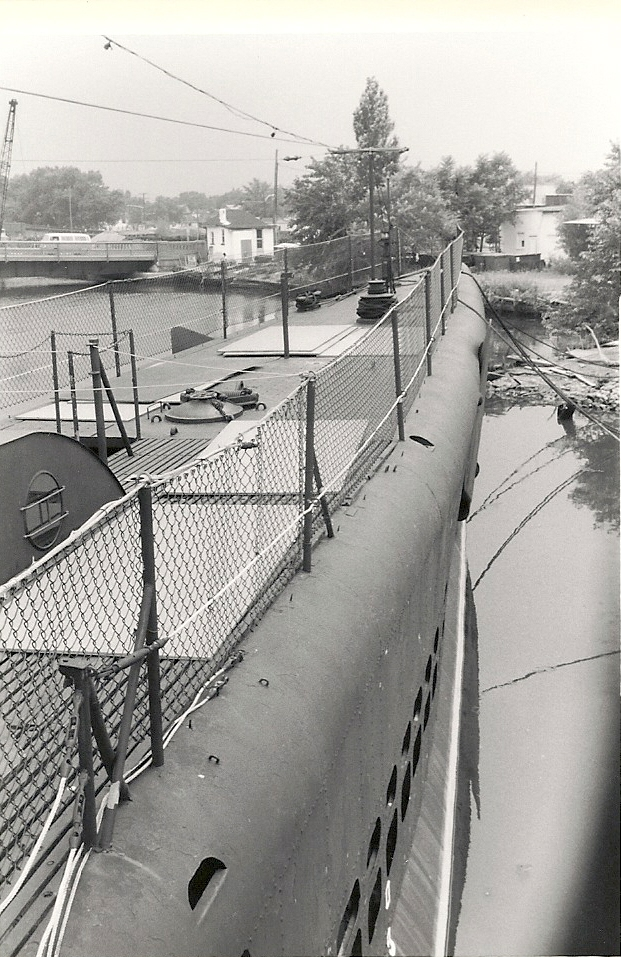
- The USS Ling in Hackensack in 1975

- Location in New Jersey
- Established: 1972
- Dissolved: June 1, 2016
- Location: Hackensack, New Jersey, United States
- Coordinates: 40.880127°N 74.039934°W
- Type: Naval
- Key holdings: USS Ling, Japanese Kaiten IIs, German Seehund
- President: Les Altschuler
- Curator: Arthur Bischoff
- Owner: Submarine Memorial Association

The New Jersey Naval Museum (NJNM) was a museum located along the Hackensack River in Hackensack in Bergen County, New Jersey, United States. Its mission was dedicated to the state's naval heritage and naval history in general. The prominent element in the collection was the ex-United States Navy USS Ling, a 312-foot (95 m) long Balao-class submarine of World War II. The museum land has since been sold for redevelopment, however, the Ling remains grounded in the river, with an uncertain future. Efforts have been made since 2007 to find a new home for the Ling. In 2019, the Louisville Naval Museum began a campaign to attempt to relocate the ship to the Ohio River. In September 2020 volunteers associated with the Louisville Naval Museum began to raise concerns on social media about improper accounting of donations made to the Louisville Naval Museum. The volunteers ceased working with the Louisville Naval Museum after one of the volunteers suffered a serious injury while working aboard the Ling in November 2020. The injured volunteer was subsequently awarded a default judgement of $468,584 in a suit against the Louisville Naval Museum.

From 1972 until closing, the Museum had paid one dollar per year to rent its riverside site. In January 2007, the North Jersey Media Group, owner of the site, informed the museum that the site was going to be sold for redevelopment within the year and that the museum and submarine would need to be relocated.

== Collections ==
Prior to the closing of the museum, guided tours of the Ling were available to take visitors from bow to stern, exploring equipment, quarters, and weaponry. The weaponry on the Ling includes twenty-four torpedoes and one 4 in (100 mm) deck gun (it originally had two 5 in (130 mm) deck guns) for handling military targets too small to warrant the expenditure of a torpedo.

Volunteers maintained Japanese Kaiten IIs, a World War II manned torpedo; a German Seehund, a World War II German two-man coastal defense submarine; and a Vietnam War-era Patrol Boat, River (PBR), all of which the US Navy has since reclaimed, in addition to Ling and some torpedoes, missiles, and artillery shells. The onshore museum building contained a number of different and unique items ranging from a United States Navy SEALs delivery vehicle to personal photographs and effects.

== Closing ==
After Hurricane Sandy the gangway was destroyed, leading to the closure of the sub and museum. Furthermore, the area was selected for a development project. The Naval History and Heritage Command has taken several artifacts after they were in a state of disrepair; with the remaining artifacts being housed by Harbor Freight Transport.

== Vandalism and burglary ==
In September 2018, artifacts from the submarine were stolen, and the Ling was also flooded. Several people were identified in connection with the burglary.

== See also ==
- List of maritime museums in the United States
- List of museum ships
- Naval History and Heritage Command
