= Jef McAllister =

American journalist

- Born: J.F.O. McAllister; February 13, 1956 (age 70); United States
- Education: Yale University (BA); Linacre College, Oxford (DPhil)
- Occupations: Managing Partner at McAllister Olivarius; Journalist

J.F.O. 'Jef' McAllister (born February 13, 1956) is an American journalist, author and lawyer. Formerly the London Bureau Chief of Time magazine, he is currently the Managing Partner of McAllister Olivarius, an international law firm headquartered in London. He is married to Ann Olivarius.

== Education and career ==
McAllister graduated summa cum laude, Phi Beta Kappa from Yale College in 1977 with a concentration in American diplomatic history. He spent one year as a reporter in the Philippines on a Luce Scholarship. He then attended Linacre College at Oxford University as a Marshall Scholar, earning a D.Phil. in Modern History. While there he co-wrote The Right Hand of Power, the memoirs of U. Alexis Johnson. McAllister then returned to law school at Yale, before becoming a career journalist.

Between 1995 and 1997, McAllister was Time magazine's White House Correspondent, covering foreign and domestic policies and the internal politics of the Clinton Administration. In his previous assignment as Diplomatic Correspondent, McAllister accompanied Secretaries of State James Baker, Lawrence Eagleburger and Warren Christopher on their foreign travels, and contributed to or wrote more than 40 cover stories on diplomacy.

McAllister served as Chief of Time magazine's London Bureau from 1999 to 2007, covering the U.K. and Ireland for Time and Time International, and for writing widely about Europe and its relations with the rest of the world. In this role, he authored cover stories on Tony Blair, the 2005 United Kingdom general election, EU expansion, Muslims in Europe, the siege in the Russian city of Beslan, terrorist bombings in London, the 2006 G-8 summit and the BBC. In 2006 he won the Foreign Press Association's award for Best Story by a Foreign Correspondent, for his cover story on how Queen Elizabeth has modernized the monarchy.

Since 2007, he has been the managing partner of McAllister Olivarius. In addition to his legal practice, he comments regularly on politics and diplomacy for the BBC and other news organisations.
