= USS Ling =

U.S. Navy submarine and museum ship

USS Ling (SS-297)
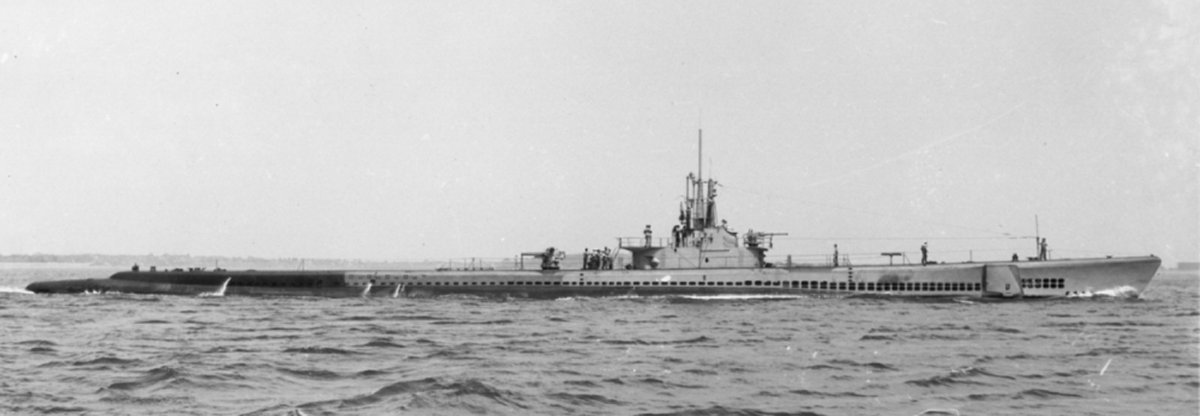
- USS Ling (SS-297), wearing camouflage paint scheme in July 1945, during sea trials.

History

United States
- Namesake: cobia
- Builder: Cramp Shipbuilding Co., Philadelphia; Brooklyn Navy Yard, Brooklyn (rebuilt)
- Yard number: 552
- Laid down: 2 November 1942
- Launched: 15 August 1943
- Commissioned: 8 June 1945
- Decommissioned: 26 October 1946
- Stricken: 1 December 1971
- Honours and awards: 1 Battle Star
- Status: Former museum ship, at former location of the New Jersey Naval Museum in Hackensack, New Jersey

General characteristics
- Class & type: Balao-class diesel-electric submarine
- Displacement: 1,526 long tons (1,550 t) surfaced; 2,424 long tons (2,463 t) submerged
- Length: 311 ft 8 in (95.00 m)
- Beam: 27 ft 3 in (8.31 m)
- Draft: 16 ft 10 in (5.13 m) maximum
- Propulsion: 4 × Fairbanks-Morse Model 38D8-1/8 9-cylinder opposed-piston diesel engines driving electrical generators; 2 × 126-cell Sargo batteries; 4 × high-speed Elliott electric motors with reduction gears; 2 × propellers; 5,400 shp (4.0 MW) surfaced; 2,740 shp (2.04 MW) submerged
- Speed: 20.25 knots (37.50 km/h; 23.30 mph) surfaced; 8.75 knots (16.21 km/h; 10.07 mph) submerged
- Range: 11,000 nmi (20,000 km; 13,000 mi) surfaced at 10 knots (19 km/h; 12 mph)
- Endurance: 48 hours at 2 knots (3.7 km/h; 2.3 mph) submerged; 75 days on patrol
- Test depth: 400 ft (120 m)
- Complement: 10 officers, 70–71 enlisted
- Armament: 10 × 21-inch (533 mm) torpedo tubes; 6 forward, 4 aft; 24 torpedoes; 1 × 4-inch (102 mm) / 50 caliber deck gun; Bofors 40 mm and Oerlikon 20 mm cannon
- U.S.S. LING
- U.S. National Register of Historic Places
- New Jersey Register of Historic Places
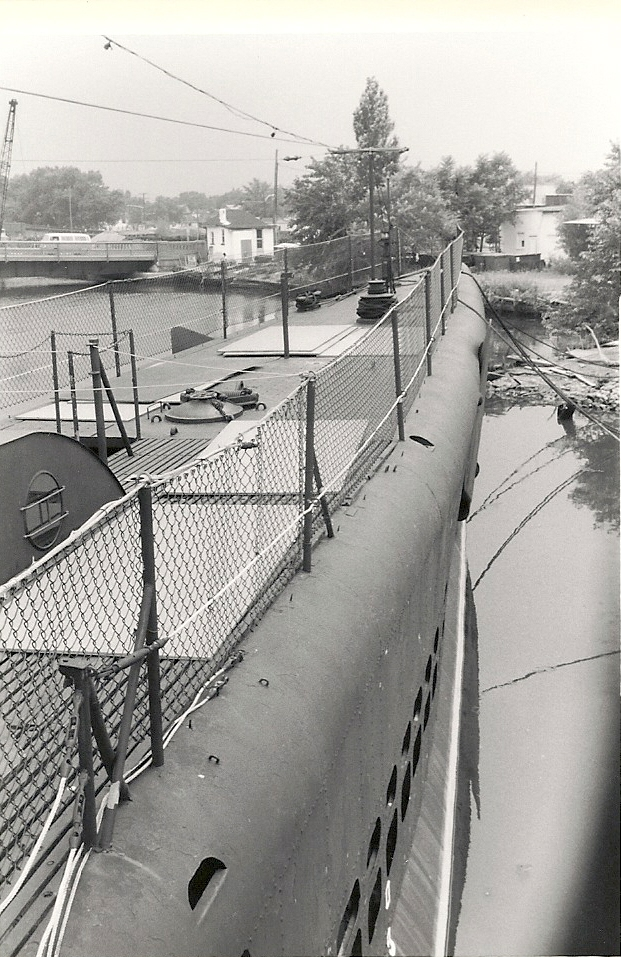

- Location within Bergen County, New Jersey Location within New Jersey Location within the United States
- Location: Hackensack River at 150 River Street, Hackensack, New Jersey
- Coordinates: 40°52′48.2″N 74°2′22.8″W
- Area: less than 1 acre (0.0040 km^{2})
- Built: 1945
- Architects: Cramp, William & Sons
- Architectural style: BALAO Class
- NRHP reference No.: 78001736
- NJRHP No.: 525

Significant dates
- Added to NRHP: 19 October 1978
- Designated NJRHP: 16 January 1978

USS Ling (hull number SS-297) is a Balao-class submarine of the United States Navy, named for the ling fish, also known as the cobia. The vessel was built during World War II, but was completed in the final months of the conflict and so saw no action. She was placed in reserve in 1946 until being converted into a training ship in 1960. In 1971, she was struck from the naval register and donated to the Submarine Memorial Association for use as a museum ship. The ship was grounded in the Hackensack River at the former location of the defunct New Jersey Naval Museum in Hackensack, New Jersey. Since 2011, Ling has been inaccessible to the public.

== History ==
Ling was laid down on 2 November 1942 by the Cramp Shipbuilding Company of Philadelphia. She was launched on 15 August 1943, sponsored by Mrs. E. J. Foy, and was moved to the Boston Navy Yard for completion and testing. Ling was commissioned on 8 June 1945. (The 3 year 7 month period between keel laying to commissioning was unusually long for a World War II submarine.)

After shakedown and further installations, Ling headed out to sea to test her equipment on 15 September 1945, 13 days after Japan had formally surrendered. The submarine was based at Naval Submarine Base New London in Connecticut until she sailed on 11 February 1946 for the Panama Canal Zone, arriving eight days later. She operated out of Panama until 9 March when she sailed north. She completed inactivation on 23 October at New London and was decommissioned on 26 October 1946. Ling entered the Atlantic Reserve Fleet, after having been in commission for only 1 year, 4 months and 18 days.

In March 1960, Ling was towed to Brooklyn, New York, where she was converted into a training ship at the Brooklyn Navy Yard, simulating all aspects of submarine operations. She was reclassified an Auxiliary Submarine (with the hull number AGSS-297) in 1962.

Ling received the American Campaign Medal and the World War II Victory Medal for her service. Ling was reclassified a Miscellaneous Unclassified Submarine (with the hull number IXSS-297), and struck from the Naval Register, 1 December 1971.

== Museum ship ==
Six months later, Ling was donated to the Submarine Memorial Association, a non-profit organization formed in 1972 with the purpose of saving Ling from the scrap yard. They petitioned the Navy to bring the boat to Hackensack, New Jersey to serve as a memorial "to perpetuate the memory of our shipmates who gave their lives in the pursuit of their duties while serving their country." Many citizens and corporations contributed time, professional services, and funds toward the restoration of Ling. She arrived at her present home in New Jersey in January 1973, where she was restored to near-mint condition—scrubbed, painted, and polished for public tours—through the efforts of the association. The compartments were refurbished and outfitted with authentic gear that recreated the bygone era of the World War II battle submarine. She was the centerpiece of the New Jersey Naval Museum at 78 River St., Hackensack, New Jersey.

X-rays showed that the submarine's five safes contained documents and metallic objects, but the combinations had long been lost. On 27 January 2006, Jeff Sitar, the eight-time world champion locksmith, opened the safes using only his fingers and an electronic sound amplifier, rather than drills or explosives. In the safes, he found a wide variety of objects, including a dozen pennies, two .45-caliber bullets, a ring of keys, many training and maintenance manuals and parts catalogs from the 1940s and 1950s, and two 1-US-quart (950 ml) cans of 190-proof ethanol.

In the American-produced Russian language film Katya shot in 2010, Ling was used for a set to depict the Soviet Navy's diesel-electric powered submarine K-129 which sank on 8 March 1968 northwest of Oahu.

=== Site ===
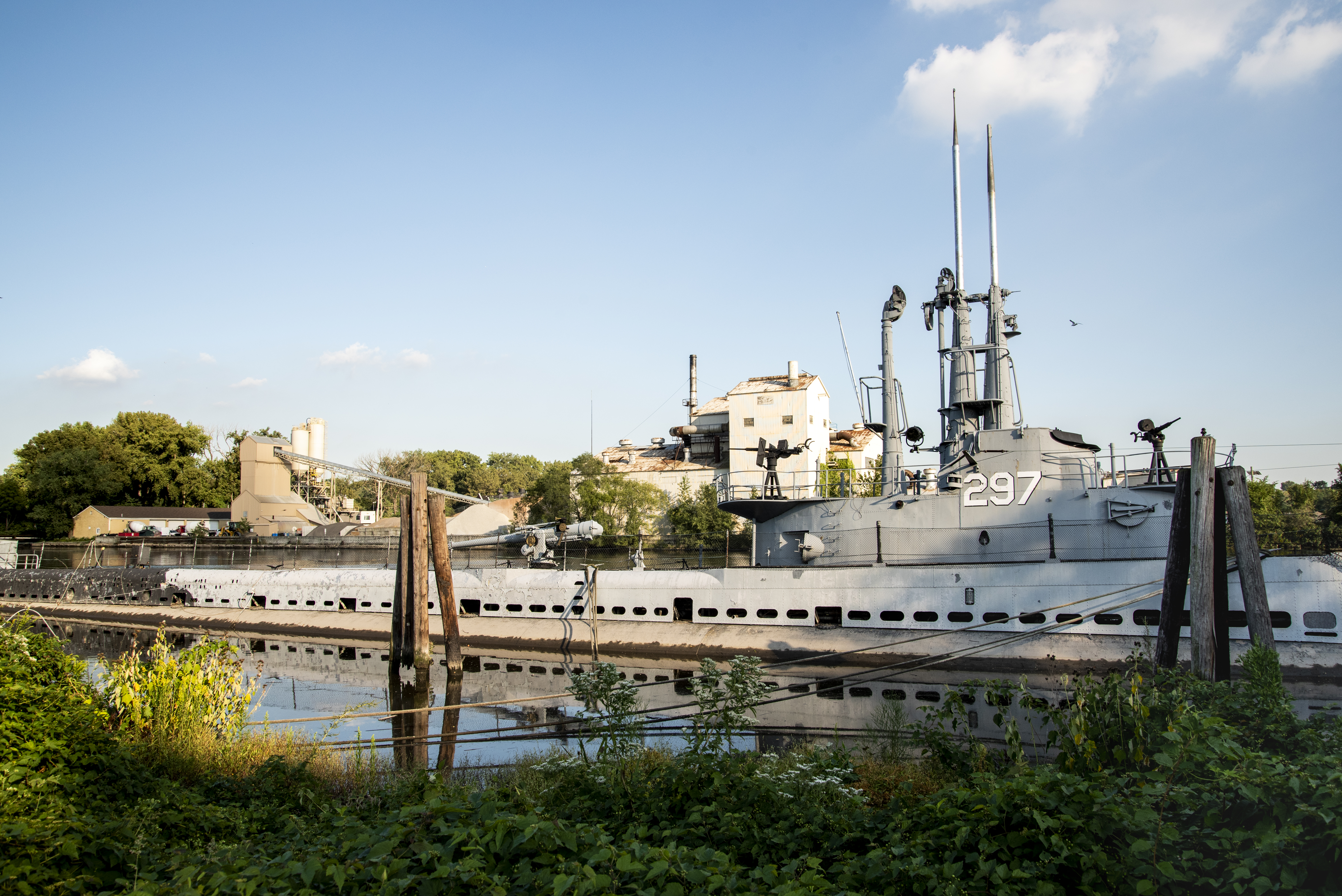
Ling in 2018

From 1972 until the closing of the New Jersey Naval Museum, the Museum had paid one dollar per year to rent its riverside site for Ling. In January 2007, the North Jersey Media Group, owner of the site, informed the museum that the site was going to be sold for redevelopment within the year and that the museum and submarine would need to be relocated. As of September 2013 the museum itself was closed due to damage in 2012 from Hurricane Sandy. The Navy removed all of the remaining static displays located on the shoreline adjacent to the submarine.

As of 2026, the Ling sits in an embankment of mud. The former Bergen Record site is now a mixed use development called The Print House, the owners of which built a walking path and installed fencing and a bench adjacent to the submarine. There is no interpretive signage. The State of New Jersey continues to list the Ling as the official naval museum of the state, in spite of there being no active museum since 2012. The City of Hackensack, Bergen County, the State, the Army Corps of Engineers, and the developer and owner of the Print House complex have all refused to take action to repair, renovate, paint, or remove the Ling. The hull shows signs of severe rusting and degradation, particularly the bow section. The Ling continues to be a source of concern of the environmental organization Hackensack Riverkeeper.

=== Vandalism ===
In August 2018, Ling was vandalized. Locks were cut on interior doors, and hatches were opened, allowing up to 14 feet (4.3 m) of water to flood the interior of the ship. Memorial plaques were also stolen from a US Submarine Service memorial on the shore, but were later found to be on the property of one of the museum personnel, who claimed that he had removed the plaques for 'safekeeping.'

Further vandalism was experienced when a group of residents from Louisville, Kentucky, who reportedly wanted to move Ling to that city, began a series of visits to the vessel during which they used power washers to blast water on to the submarine's hull. This action caused the lead-based paint to be deposited in the Hackensack River, and severely hastened the rusting of the hull. This group had no legal authority to visit, enter, or operate on the submarine, and their actions were reported to and monitored by the New Jersey Department of Environmental Protection and the Hackensack Police.

=== Relocation issues ===
Although numerous persons and entities have suggested the idea of moving the submarine to alternate locations, relocating the Ling is not possible. Freshwater flow in the Hackensack River has been drastically reduced for use as drinking water by the Oradell Dam. The navigable ship channel on the river has only been maintained as far north as the Riverbend in Hudson County. The accumulation of silt has effectively filled in the formerly navigable channel. The present depth of the Hackensack River is too shallow to allow Ling to move downstream, and there are no funds or plans to dredge the river, the muds of which are laced with industrial toxins. Ling therefore cannot be moved from her location. Furthermore, there are four bridges across the Hackensack River, south of Ling, which do not open or move. Two are vehicular bridges, and two are rail bridges, one operated by New Jersey Transit and one operated by both New Jersey Transit and Amtrak. These bridges also make moving the submarine downriver impossible.

== See also ==
- National Register of Historic Places listings in Bergen County, New Jersey
