= Sophia Bush =

American actress (born 1982)

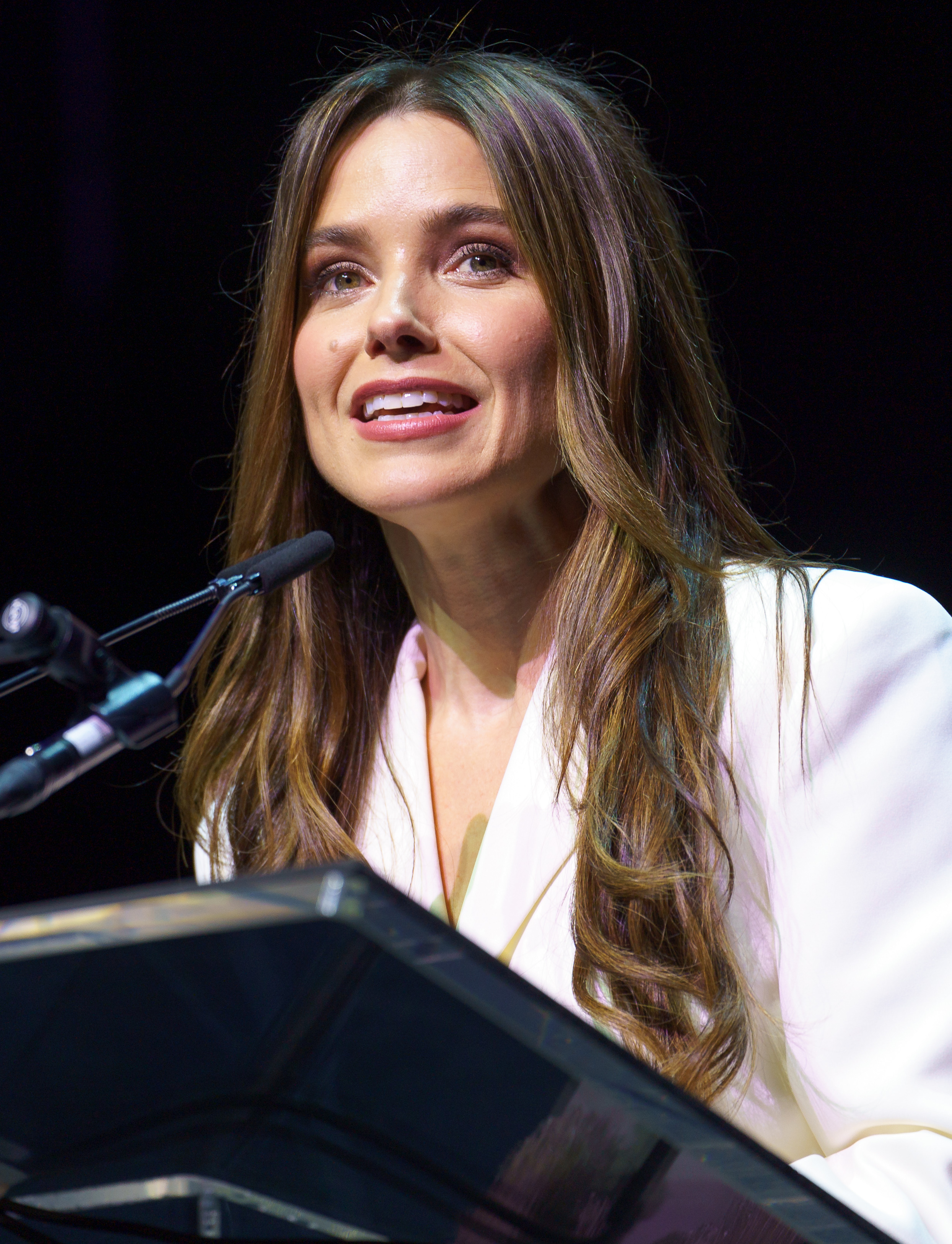
- Bush at SXSW in 2024
- Born: Sophia Anna Bush; July 8, 1982 (age 44); Pasadena, California, U.S.
- Occupations: Actress; activist; producer; Author
- Years active: 2001–present
- Spouses: Chad Michael Murray (m. 2005; div. 2006) Grant Hughes (m. 2022; div. 2023) Ashlyn Harris (m. 2025)

Sophia Anna Bush (born July 8, 1982) is an American actress, activist and best-selling author. She starred as Brooke Davis in the teen drama series One Tree Hill (2003–2012), and as Erin Lindsay in the police procedural drama series Chicago P.D. (2014–2017). She was a producer for and starred in the lead role of Dr. Samantha "Sam" Griffith in the medical drama Good Sam (2022).

Bush has also appeared in films, including John Tucker Must Die (2006), The Hitcher (2007), The Narrows (2008), Chalet Girl (2011), Marshall (2017), Acts of Violence (2018), and Incredibles 2 (2018). She is also known for her philanthropy work and social activism, including her work for the Time's Up movement and DoSomething.org. Bush co-hosted the Drama Queens podcast along with her former One Tree Hill co-stars, Hilarie Burton, Bethany Joy Lenz and Robert Buckley.

== Early life and education ==
Bush was born in Pasadena, California, the only child of Maureen Searson and Charles William Bush. Her mother manages a photography studio and her father is an advertising and beauty photographer. On her father's side, she is a great-grandniece of Hudson Allison, who died in the sinking of the Titanic with his wife and daughter; Bush's paternal grandmother, Margaret Jean Bush (née Allison), was the daughter of Hudson's brother, Percy Allison.

In 2000, she graduated from Westridge School for Girls in Pasadena, where she was a member of the volleyball team. At Westridge, she was required to participate in the theater arts program. Bush said, "Part of my school's requirement was to do a play. I was really irritated because I wanted to play volleyball and I had to go and do this play. But there was a moment after the performance when I realized I had gone and been somebody else. I thought, 'If I could do this for the rest of my life, I am set.' It was like love at first sight." At age 17, Bush was named the Tournament of Roses Parade Queen in 1999. At the time she planned to major in both theater and psychology at Tulane University in New Orleans.

== Career ==
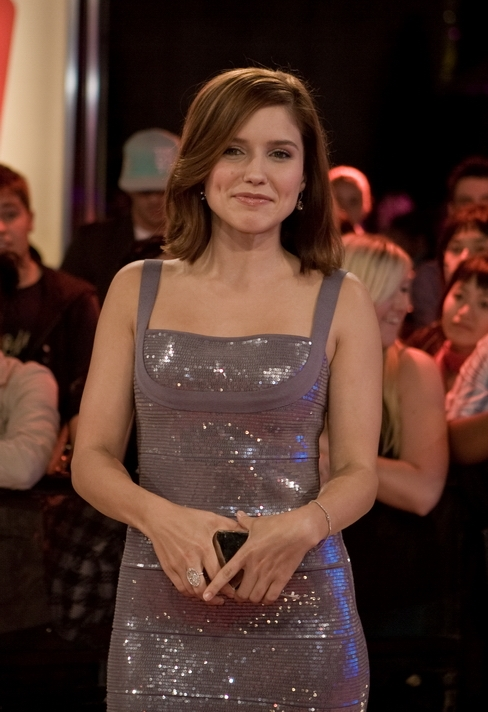
Bush at the 2008 Toronto International Film Festival

Bush made her first film appearance in the 2002 film National Lampoon's Van Wilder opposite Ryan Reynolds. Then she made appearances in several television shows, including Nip/Tuck, Sabrina the Teenage Witch, and Point of Origin, an HBO film. In 2002, Bush was cast as Kate Brewster in Terminator 3: Rise of the Machines, though she was replaced by Claire Danes after a week of filming. Jonathan Mostow, the director of the film said that he had replaced her as he felt she was too young for the role, but praised her talent as an actress.

In 2003, Bush was cast as Brooke Davis in the WB television series One Tree Hill. After Bush gained mainstream fame, she became a spokesperson for high-profile brands and posed on the cover of several mainstream magazines, including Entertainment Weekly, Lucky, Maxim, Glamour, InStyle, and Zooey Magazine. She has had several endorsement deals, one of which was with Ocean Pacific sportswear. Bush and her One Tree Hill co-stars were endorsers for MasterCard, Kmart, Chevy Cobalt and Cingular Wireless. She directed three episodes of the series, including the penultimate episode of the ninth and final season.

In July 2006, Bush co-starred in the 20th Century Fox comedy film John Tucker Must Die, directed by Betty Thomas, opposite Brittany Snow and Jesse Metcalfe. The film was a commercial success, grossing over $60 million worldwide. Also in 2006, she starred in Buena Vista Pictures' supernatural thriller Stay Alive alongside Jon Foster, Frankie Muniz, and Adam Goldberg. The film, the first to be released by Hollywood Pictures in five years, opened at number three in the U.S. box office. She played Grace Andrews in the 2007 remake of the classic horror film The Hitcher, starring opposite Sean Bean. In 2008, Bush co-starred alongside Kevin Zegers and Vincent D'Onofrio in François Velle's independent film The Narrows, playing Kathy Popovich. Based on Tim McLoughlin's novel Heart of the Old Country, the film premiered at the Toronto International Film Festival in September 2008. Three years later, she co-starred in the British romantic comedy film Chalet Girl, which was released in February 2011.

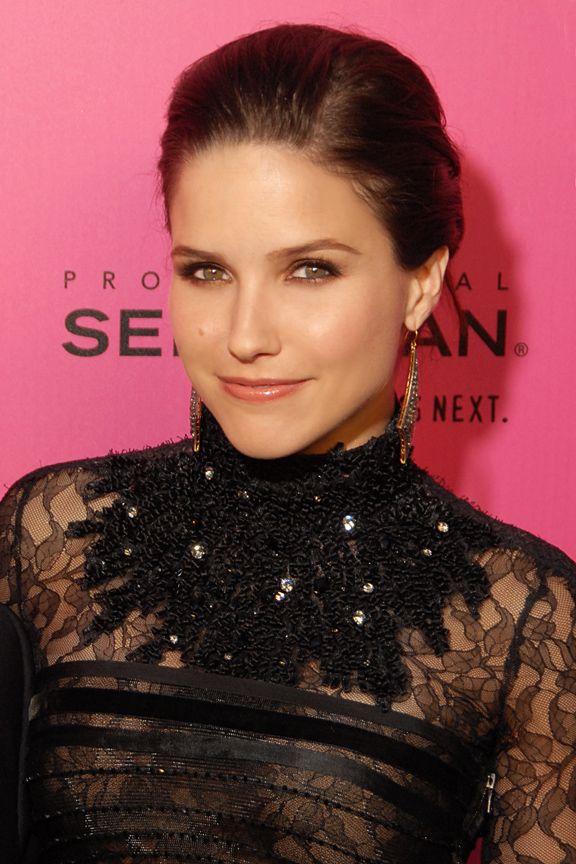
Bush at the Hollywood Style Awards, October 10, 2009

In February 2012, Bush was reported as having joined the cast of the upcoming CBS sitcom Partners. Premiering on September 24, 2012, the series ran for a single season until November, when it was announced that the series had been canceled after six episodes. The remaining seven episodes of the series' initial thirteen-episode order remain unaired in the United States, though they were later aired by various international outlets. In 2013, Bush starred in Passion Pit's "Carried Away" music video, which debuted on February 14. That same year, she was cast in a main role in the television pilot Hatfields & McCoys, but the project failed to be picked up to series.

In August 2013, Bush joined the cast of Chicago P.D. as Det. Erin Lindsay. The series premiered on January 8, 2014. She left the series after four seasons. In December 2018, she cited "abusive behavior" as the reason for leaving the show. Bush also frequently appeared on the first and third Chicago franchise series, Chicago Fire and Chicago Med respectively. In 2018, Bush provided the voice of Voyd, an aspiring superhero, in Pixar's film, Incredibles 2, the sequel to 2004's The Incredibles. In 2019, Bush started her own podcast titled Work in Progress.

In 2020, Bush appeared as Veronica in four episodes of the first season of Love, Victor on Hulu. Since 2021, Bush has been a co-host on the Drama Queens podcast along with her former One Tree Hill co-stars, Hilarie Burton Morgan and Bethany Joy Lenz. In April 2023, it was announced that Bush would make her West End debut in 2:22 A Ghost Story at the Apollo Theatre. Citing a medical issue, Bush announced that she would no longer be a part of the production in July 2023. In 2023, Bush appeared on Celebrity Family Feud, competing against Gayle King and her team.

In November 2026, it was announced that her memoir And I Will Tell you Mine: Notes from a Life in Progress became a #1 best seller on the New York Times Best Seller's List under Hardcover Non-Fiction.

== Personal life ==
Bush was engaged to her One Tree Hill co-star Chad Michael Murray in May 2004, and they married on April 16, 2005, in Santa Monica, California. After five months of marriage, the pair announced their separation in September 2005. In February 2006, Bush filed papers for an annulment, citing fraud. Bush's petition was denied, and she and Murray were instead granted a divorce in December 2006. Bush later said that it "devastate[d]" her to "have been reduced to a Hollywood statistic—another joke marriage". In a January 2014 episode of Watch What Happens: Live, she described the pair as "two stupid kids who had no business being in a relationship in the first place".

From 2006 to 2007, Bush dated her Stay Alive co-star Jon Foster. They remained friends after splitting. From 2008 to 2009, Bush dated her One Tree Hill co-star James Lafferty. She also dated actor Austin Nichols, confirming in May 2010 that they had been dating on and off for four years. Nichols took the role of Julian Baker on One Tree Hill to be with Bush, who ended their relationship in 2012. From 2013 to 2014, Bush dated Dan Fredinburg, a program manager for Google. Bush cited the strains of their long-distance relationship as the cause of separation. She stayed friends with Fredinburg afterward, and noted how his death on Mount Everest in 2015 significantly impacted her.

From 2014 to 2016, Bush dated her Chicago P.D. co-star, actor Jesse Lee Soffer. In 2020, she began dating businessman Grant Hughes and in August 2021 announced their engagement via Instagram. They were married on June 11, 2022, at the Philbrook Museum of Art in Tulsa, Oklahoma. On August 4, 2023, Bush filed for divorce after 13 months of marriage.

In April 2024, Bush confirmed her relationship with former professional soccer player Ashlyn Harris and came out as queer in an article in Glamour that she wrote. In September 2026, it was revealed in Bush's memoir that she and Harris had married in secret during the summer of the previous year.

== Activism ==
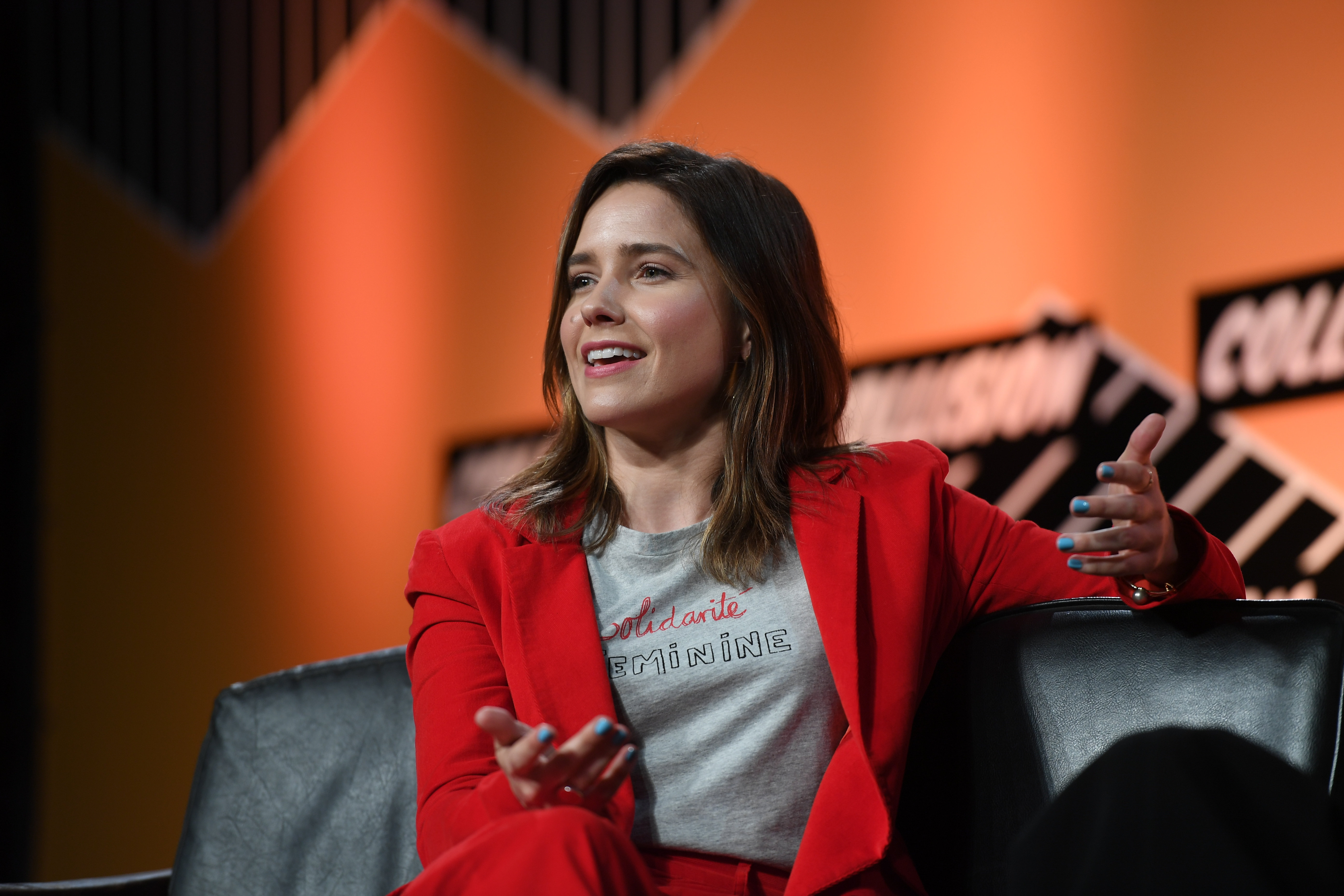
Bush prepares to speak on the Center Stage at Collision 2017 in New Orleans, Louisiana

Bush is a part of fundraisers such as __ Cancer, Run for the Gulf, and Global Green Gulf Relief and has been involved in political issues including her support for Barack Obama's candidacy for president in the 2008 election. In February 2008, she made several appearances in Texas in support of the Obama campaign in the Democratic presidential primary election. Bush was joined in Dallas, Fort Worth, and Waco by fellow actor Adam Rodríguez. Touring mostly college campuses, they urged young voters to get involved politically.

In April 2009, along with stars Sarah Chalke, Jason Lewis, Alicia Silverstone, Jane Lynch, and Lance Bass, Bush appeared in the Funny or Die video "A Gaythering Storm", which parodied a National Organization for Marriage video objecting to same-sex marriage. Bush is a staunch supporter of gay rights and, in May 2009, she showed up at a rally in protest of Proposition 8. She carried a sign stating, "I DO support the freedom to marry", and a shirt which had the words "Legalize Gay" across it. In an interview in January 2012, Bush said about the 2012 Republican candidates: "I will not vote for a candidate who thinks you can 'pray away the gay,' I will not vote for a candidate who thinks that he has more rights to my uterus than I do, I will not vote for a candidate who thinks that it's okay to dump toxic waste in the ocean. I'm afraid for our country that people like this could even be thought of as the president. I live in a country where I believe all men are created equal, not just wealthy white guys. I believe all men, all women, regardless of race, gender, socioeconomic background, you deserve the same rights." In June 2016, the Human Rights Campaign released a video in tribute to the victims of the Orlando nightclub shooting; in the video, Bush and others told the stories of the people killed there.

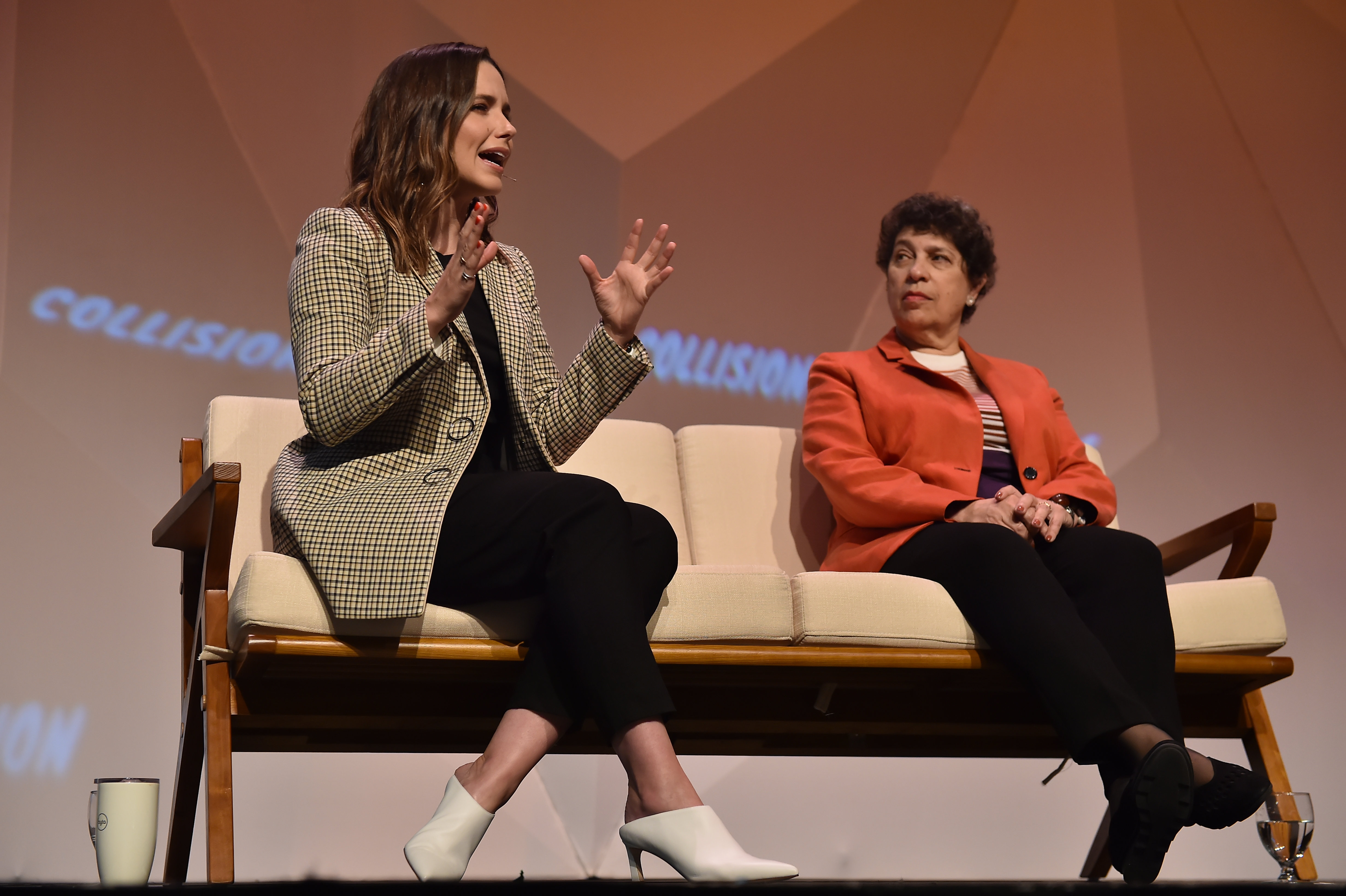
Bush with Susan Herman, President of American Civil Liberties Union on center stage during day three of Collision 2018 at Ernest N. Morial Convention Center in New Orleans

Bush set up a fundraiser intended to help people living in the area of the Gulf of Mexico affected by the environmental disaster of the Deepwater Horizon oil spill on April 20, 2010. The actress has visited Louisiana and testified in interviews of the horror she felt when she visited those places. The fundraiser is on the Internet through crowdsourcing website Crowdrise.com. The actress, to support the fundraiser, announced that she would be running a half marathon that following November, despite having asthma and a year-old knee injury. Bush has additionally teamed up with Do Something to raise more environmental awareness among teens. She was chosen as the spokesperson to endorse the launch of eMission, a Facebook game with the social mission to engage America's youth in fighting climate change created through the joint efforts of Do Something and U.S. Environmental Protection Agency's (EPA) Energy Star program.

In 2011, Bush won the Do Something Twitter Award for having spread the word via her Twitter account on how her followers could help with the cleanup after the Deepwater Horizon oil spill. She was voted "Fan Favorite" by Facebook users on DoSomething.org. In 2011, Bush also became involved in the Pencils of Promise organization, which builds schools and increases educational opportunities in the developing world. In December 2011, Bush competed with other stars in the Mozilla Firefox Challenge, a one-month fundraising contest whose winner is granted $25,000 to put toward a favorite cause; she won the contest in January 2012. In April 2013, Bush took part in Global Poverty Project's "Live Below the Line" campaign, which consists in living on $1.50 a day to raise awareness of extreme poverty around the world. In 2013, Bush hosted a Prizeo campaign to raise funds for one of her favorite causes, I Am that Girl. As part of the campaign, Bush offered donors a grand prize of the opportunity to skydive with her. In 2014, Bush's foreword to Alexis Jones' debut novel I Am that Girl was released and distributed by accessories retailer Claire's. In 2016, Bush was named to Oprah's SuperSoul 100 list of visionaries and influential leaders.

Bush is a founding member of the movement Time's Up. Two of her contributions include creating a clothing line benefiting Planned Parenthood and giving a speech at the Women's March on January 20, 2018. Sophia is also constantly using her social media platforms, such as Twitter, encouraging people to participate in the ongoing activism opportunities around the world.

In the 2018 fight over the nomination of Brett Kavanaugh to the Supreme Court, Bush was supportive of Christine Blasey Ford, and praised her "strength" throughout the controversy. Bush tweeted, "To everyone saying 'why did they wait? The timing feels suspect,' etc. Just remember Bill Cosby. No one wanted to believe it about him. It was true. And he's going to prison. I'd wager more women victimized by Kavanaugh will come forward. Women feel safety in numbers #TimesUp". In 2020, Bush joined the ownership group for Angel City FC of the National Women's Soccer League.

In July 2022, Bush and Grant Hughes wrote an essay for Glamour affirming their support of abortion rights in the wake of the Supreme Court issuing the decision of Dobbs v. Jackson Women's Health Organization that subsequently overturned Roe v. Wade. In the piece, Bush wrote,

This moment is nothing short of a national emergency. But these days it also feels incredibly personal. Because I type this as I look across the kitchen at my husband. A man with whom I am deeply in love. And a man who might never have come into my life, nor me into his, had it not been for an abortion. Not my experience—I have never had an abortion—but his. An abortion that he and a former partner had is what got us here.

Bush is known for promulgating her progressive views on her social media pages. She uses Twitter, Facebook, Instagram, and her blog to raise awareness of world events and fundraisers in which she takes part, as well as a platform to raise awareness on progressive issues and political events that are occurring. In November 2024, Bush signed an exclusive partnership agreement with Washington Speakers Bureau (WSB), where she advocates for economic growth, women's empowerment, and community engagement.

=== I Am a Voter ===
In 2018, Bush helped found a nonpartisan movement with Mandana Dayani that aims to create a cultural shift in voting and civic engagement by unifying around a central truth: that democracy works best when we all participate. I Am a Voter has partnered with Disney, NBA, NFL, McDonald's, Stuart Weitzman, and Bumble. Its campaign to boost voter registration included participants Debra Messing, Eric McCormack, Sean Hayes, Gwyneth Paltrow, Robert Downey Jr., Jennifer Aniston, Lisa Kudrow, Courteney Cox, Bush, Hilarie Burton, and Bethany Joy Lenz. According to I Am a Voter, the effort generated over one billion digital impressions and 250 media articles upon launch.

== Public image ==
Bush's appearance has often been the subject of media attention. She was ranked No. 3 on Femme Fatales: The 50 Sexiest Women of 2004 and named No. 15 on Much Music's 20 Hottest Women of 2004. In April 2007, she ranked No. 90 in the British popular men's magazine FHM, in their countdown of 100 Sexiest Women of 2007. Subsequently, she ranked No. 89 in the American edition of the same magazine. In May 2007, Bush ranked No. 24 in the Maxim Hot 100 List of 2007. She also appeared on the cover of the November 2006 edition of Maxim with her One Tree Hill co-stars Hilarie Burton and Danneel Harris. She ranked No. 30 on Maxim's "Hot 100" of 2014 list. She was featured in People's "Beautiful at Every Age" and "Most Beautiful" lists for several years.

Bush has been featured in several fashion blogs and magazines including CosmoGirl, Health, Lucky, Zooey, Saturday Night, Teen People, and Bello.

== Filmography ==
=== Film ===
Year	Title	Role	Notes
2002	National Lampoon's Van Wilder	Sally	
2003	Learning Curves	Beth	
2005	Supercross	Zoe Lang	
2006	Stay Alive	October Bantum	
2006	John Tucker Must Die	Beth McIntyre	
2007	The Hitcher	Grace Andrews	
2008	The Narrows	Kathy Popovich	
2009	Table for Three	Mary Kincaid	
2011	Chalet Girl	Chloe	
2011	Mob Wives	Carla Facciolo	Short film
2012	Mob Wives 2: The Christening	Carla Facciolo	Short film
2017	Marshall	Jen at the Bar	
2018	Acts of Violence	Detective Brooke Baker	
2018	Incredibles 2	Karen / Voyd	Voice role
2020	Hard Luck Love Song	Carla	
2021	False Positive	Corgan	
2022	Deborah	Nora	
2024	Junction	Allison	
2024	Freedom Hair	Dana Berliner	
2025	The Stranger in My Home	Ali	
2026	Broad Trip	Alice	
2026	Summer's Last Resort	Milly	
TBA	The Cheetah Girls: Next Gen	Jennifré	

=== Television ===
Year	Title	Role	Notes
2002	Point of Origin	Carrie Orr	Television film
2003	The Flannerys	Kate Flannery	Unsold television pilot
2003	Sabrina the Teenage Witch	Fate Mackenzie	Episode: "Romance Looming"
2003	Nip/Tuck	Ridley Lange	Recurring role; 3 episodes
2003–2012	One Tree Hill	Brooke Davis	Main role; 186 episodes
2009–2011	Phineas and Ferb	Sara	Voice role; 2 episodes
2010	Southern Discomfort	Haley Dobson	Unsold television pilot
2012–2013	Partners	Ali Landow	Main role; 13 episodes
2013	Hatfields & McCoys	Emma McCoy	Unsold television pilot
2013–2017	Chicago Fire	Detective Erin Lindsay	Recurring role; 11 episodes
2014	MythBusters	Herself / Princess Leia	Episode: "Star Wars: Revenge of the Myth"
2014–2017	Chicago P.D.	Detective Erin Lindsay	Main role; 84 episodes
2014–2016	Law & Order: Special Victims Unit	Detective Erin Lindsay	Recurring role; 4 episodes
2015	Pickle and Peanut	Additional voices	Episode: "Greg/Gramma Jail"
2015–2017	Chicago Med	Detective Erin Lindsay	Recurring role; 6 episodes
2017	Chicago Justice	Detective Erin Lindsay	Episode: "Tycoon"
2018	Alex, Inc.	Vanessa Stanhope	Episode: "The Cop Car"
2019	Jane the Virgin	Julie	Episode: "Chapter Ninety-Three"
2019	Easy	Alexandra	Episode: "Spontaneous Combustion"
2019	Drunk History	Bonnie Raines	Episode: "Whistleblowers"
2019	Surveillance	Maddy Yardley	Unsold television pilot
2020	This Is Us	Lizzy	Episode: "Light and Shadows"
2020	The Man Who Walked Around the World	Herself	Documentary
2020–2022	Love, Victor	Veronica	Recurring role; 9 episodes
2022	Good Sam	Dr. Sam Griffith	Lead role
2024–2026	Grey's Anatomy	Dr. Cass Beckman	Recurring role; (season 21—season 22)

=== Theatre ===
Year	Title	Role	Dates	Location	Category	Ref.
2023	2:22 A Ghost Story	Lauren	May 14 – July 21, 2023	Apollo Theatre	West End	

=== Director ===
Year	Title	Notes
2009–2012	One Tree Hill	Television series; 3 episodes

=== Producer ===
Year	Title	Notes
2015	The Thousand Year Journey	Short documentary film; executive producer
2018	A Girl Named C	Documentary film; executive producer
2018	Mother Truckers	Television documentary series; executive producer
2019	Surveillance	Unsold television pilot; producer
2022	Good Sam	Television series; producer
2023	Another Body	Documentary film; executive producer
2024	Junction	Feature film; co-producer

=== Podcasts ===
Year	Title	Notes
2019	And Especially You	Host
2019–present	Work in Progress	Host and producer
2020	Hidden in Plain Sight	Narrator
2021–2025	Drama Queens	Co-Host

=== Music videos ===
Year	Title	Role	Artist
2013	"Carried Away"	Woman	Passion Pit
2021	"St. Mark's Place"	Woman	Only Twin

=== Video games ===
Year	Title	Role	Notes
2018	Lego The Incredibles	Karen / Voyd	Voice role

== Awards and nominations ==
Year	Award	Category	Work	Result	Ref.
2005	Teen Choice Awards	Choice TV Actress – Drama	One Tree Hill	Nominated	
2006	Teen Choice Awards	Choice TV Actress – Drama	One Tree Hill	Nominated	
2007	Teen Choice Awards	Choice Movie Actress – Comedy	John Tucker Must Die	Won	
2007	Teen Choice Awards	Choice Movie Actress – Horror/Thriller	The Hitcher	Won	
2007	Teen Choice Awards	Choice Movie Female Breakout Star	The Hitcher	Won	
2007	Vail Film Festival	Rising Star Award	Herself	Won	
2008	Teen Choice Awards	Choice TV Actress – Drama	One Tree Hill	Nominated	
2010	Teen Choice Awards	Choice TV Actress – Drama	One Tree Hill	Nominated	
2011	VH1 Do Something Awards	Do Something Twitter Award	Herself	Won	
2012	Annual Young Hollywood Awards	Philanthropy Award	Herself	Won	
2016	Redefine Possible Women's Leadership	—N/a	Herself	Won	
2017	People's Choice Awards	Favorite TV Crime Drama Actress	Chicago P.D.	Nominated	
2018	Nelson Mandela Changemaker Award	—N/a	Herself	Won	
