= BriaAndChrissy =

American YouTubers

Bria and Chrissy
- Origin: Atlanta, Georgia, U.S.
- Genres: YouTube, music, videos, vlogs
- Years active: 2012–2023
- Members: Bria Kam and Chrissy Chambers
- Website: www.briaandchrissy.com

YouTube information
- Channel: BriaKamProductions
- Years active: 2012–present
- Genre: Music
- Subscribers: 917 thousand
- Views: 505 million
- Last updated: April 8, 2026

Bria Michelle Kam (born November 3, 1986) and Chrissy Emily Chambers (born October 5, 1990), better known by their stage name BriaAndChrissy, are a singing and acting duo best known for the YouTube channels "BriaAndChrissy" and "Lesbian Love", where they primarily perform original songs, comedy skits, and promote awareness for LGBT rights. While primarily professional collaborators, the two were also a couple until 2023, when it was announced through their BriaAndChrissy channel that they would be divorcing after 12 years together, citing issues with polyamory as the main reason for the divorce. BriaAndChrissy also were part of the chorus for The Greatest Show, in the 2017 American musical drama film, The Greatest Showman directed by Michael Gracey. Their professional collaboration began on YouTube in 2012 with a political satire music video featuring the couple dressed as Mitt and Ann Romney.

== Biography ==
Originally from Mississippi, Chambers relocated to Atlanta, Georgia where she acted in commercials, television, and film before teaming up with Kam. Prior to their collaboration, Kam, a singer/songwriter from Atlanta, put out a solo album titled A Long Time Coming and was a contestant for the 11th season of American Idol.

The couple has appeared in articles, interviews, and videos on pop culture and news media sites, including BuzzFeed and The Point with Ana Kasparian. In 2014, the couple appeared in Demi Lovato's music video for the song "Really Don't Care," and Kam appeared on the MTV television show Copycat where she performed a cover of the song "Blown Away." In June 2014, GO Magazine named BriaAndChrissy number 38 on their annual list of "100 Women We Love" calling them "YouTube´s most-viewed lesbian couple." The couple was also named one of The Advocate's "40 Under 40" for 2014 for their positive representation of LGBT identity on social media.

In December 2014, BriaAndChrissy released their first music video for the song "Take Me to Heaven" from the album Face Your Fears. In an interview with Kelly Morris of The Seattle Lesbian, the couple said they wanted to reflect a more serious side to their advocacy for LGBT acceptance. Of the video, Chambers said “We do a lot of ridiculous videos, but we want [our viewers] to also see how serious and passionate we are in our hearts. Bria is my heaven and our love is very genuine and true.” The couple currently resides in Los Angeles, California.

Kam and Chambers were engaged on January 17, 2018 and were married on April 7, 2018. Chambers proposed outside London's High Court after winning a high-profile revenge pornography civil case against an ex-boyfriend. They lived in Los Angeles until 2018.

On June 4, 2023, a video was posted to their shared channel stating that they had broken up.

== Controversy ==
In January 2018, Chambers became the first person in the UK to win a civil lawsuit seeking damages for revenge porn. Chambers' ex-boyfriend posted videos of them online without her consent in 2011 and 2012, which then caused her to suffer "panic, depression, PTSD, and alcoholism". In 2015, it was made illegal in the UK to post private sexual images without the other person's consent, but since the videos were posted in 2011, criminal charges could not be brought. Chambers and her attorney Dr. Ann Olivarius brought the case to civil court in 2016 and it was settled in late 2017. The settlement also granted Chambers the copyright to the videos, which gives her full legal authority over their distribution, including the right to demand removal from any site that posts the videos online. Their story was presented on Investigation Discovery's Devil In The Web episode "Revenge Porn," which aired on June 2, 2022.

== Discography and filmography ==
Select discography for Bria Kam and BriaAndChrissy

- Bria Kam A Long Time Coming (July 2011)
- BriaAndChrissy Face Your Fears (November 2013)
- BriaAndChrissy The Greatest Showman (2017) “Chorus for The Greatest Showman”

Select filmography for Chrissy Chambers

- Angry Kelly (2014) “Amanda”
- Obsessive Reaction (2013) “Emily”
- Bad Girl (2013) “Ashby”
- +1 (Plus One) (2013) “Kitty”
- Mumbhai Connection (2011) “Angela”
