= Jeff Sitar =

American locksmith (died 2019)

Jeff Sitar was a locksmith living in Clifton, New Jersey who specialized as a safe-cracker and who has won the Lockmaster's International Safecracking Competition eight times. He is known for the opening of a safe on board USS Ling and for opening a highly classified safe on board the SS Bellatrix during the Gulf War.

Jeff appeared on the Discovery Channel's show "More Than Human" where he demonstrated his skills

Jeff also appeared on Modern Marvels in 2010 in the episode "Keep Out".

Jeff died on February 22, 2019. He was 57 years old.
