= Alexander v. Yale =

American judicial case

- Court: United States Court of Appeals for the Second Circuit
- Full case name: Ronni Alexander, Ann Olivarius, Pamela Price, Margery Reifler and Lisa Stone v. Yale University
- Argued: April 16, 1980
- Decided: September 22, 1980
- Citation: 631 F.2d 178

Court membership
- Judges sitting: Joseph Edward Lumbard, William Hughes Mulligan, Adrian A. Spears (W.D. Tex.)

Case opinions
- Majority: Lumbard, joined by a unanimous court

Laws applied
- Title IX, 20 U.S.C. § 1681, et seq.

Alexander v. Yale, 631 F.2d 178 (2d Cir. 1980), was the first use of Title IX of the United States Education Amendments of 1972 in charges of sexual harassment against an educational institution. It further established that sexual harassment of female students could be considered sex discrimination, and was thus illegal.

== Background ==
The plaintiffs were Ronni Alexander, Margery Reifler, Pamela Price, Lisa E. Stone and Ann Olivarius. All were Yale College students between 1973 and 1980.

Alexander and Reifler alleged that they were sexually harassed and/or assaulted by a flute teacher, Keith Brion, and a hockey coach, respectively, and that Yale provided no procedure through which they could complain. Pamela Price alleged a classic case of what is now known as quid pro quo sexual harassment, when a course instructor offered to give her an 'A' if she complied with his sexual demands. Lisa Stone alleged emotional distress resulting from her knowledge of another female student’s experiences of sexual harassment by a male university employee without any available recourse. Ann Olivarius alleged that the absence of a procedure for complaining about sexual harassment forced her to expend her own time and money on helping fellow students who had been sexually harassed, and that in the course of providing that help she was threatened by individuals whom she was investigating, and that Yale failed to protect her from those individuals.

At the district court level, a male faculty member and Lisa Stone's thesis adviser, John Winkler, alleged that the poisoned atmosphere arising from sexual harassment made a good relationship with his students impossible. He did not join the other plaintiffs' appeal.

The plaintiffs did not seek damages from Yale. Rather, they wanted the court to order Yale to set up a grievance procedure for students who felt they had been sexually harassed.

== Decisions ==
The students were advised by Catharine MacKinnon, who had just graduated from Yale Law School. MacKinnon was working on her groundbreaking book, Sexual Harassment of Working Women, and shared pre-publication copies with the Women's Rights Litigation Clinic at Rutgers Law School, which represented Alexander and her co-plaintiffs. Alexander v. Yale was an early test of MacKinnon's theory that sexual harassment constituted sex discrimination.

The plaintiffs argued that sexual harassment constituted sex discrimination and that Yale University was thus in contravention of Title IX, which stated that educational institutions receiving federal money could not discriminate on the basis of sex. This novel legal strategy, which made use of Title IX, was developed by MacKinnon, Olivarius (then still an undergraduate), and Anne E. Simon, then working for the New Haven Law Collective and now a California Public Utilities Commission Administrative Law Judge. The District Court upheld their legal argument, ruling that, "It is perfectly reasonable to maintain that academic advancement conditioned upon submission to sexual demands constitutes sex discrimination in education." The Court, however, found that Price had not been sexually propositioned in exchange for better grades. It dismissed the other plaintiffs' allegations as either moot because they had graduated, or untenable.

The women appealed. Equal Rights Advocates (ERA) and Women Organized Against Sexual Harassment (WOASH) filed a joint friend-of-the-court brief (amicus curiae) when Alexander v. Yale was appealed. Another amicus brief was filed jointly by the ACLU and others. The U.S. Court of Appeals upheld the judgment of the lower court, holding in addition that the allegations were no longer relevant because Yale had instituted a grievance procedure.

== Impact ==
Although the women did not win their case, they achieved their objectives: Yale instituted a grievance procedure and a court held that sexual harassment constituted sex discrimination.

As a result of Alexander v. Yale most U.S. universities instituted grievance procedures for sexual harassment.

The case received media coverage in The New York Times, Time magazine and The Nation, which contributed to the emerging concept of sexual harassment.

In 1986, the Supreme Court ruled, in Meritor Savings Bank v. Vinson, that a hostile work environment constituted sexual discrimination, vindicating another line of argument in Alexander v. Yale.

Three of the five plaintiffs – Ann Olivarius, Pamela Price and Ronni Alexander – have gone on to be prominent attorneys or law professors.

In April 2012, the plaintiffs were collectively honored by the ACLU in its list of the nine most influential actors in the history of Title IX.

== See also ==
- Sexual harassment in education
- Hostile environment sexual harassment
- Feminist legal theory
