= Jeff Anderson (attorney) =

American attorney (born 1947)

Jeff Anderson (born August 27, 1947) is an American personal injury attorney who leads Jeff Anderson & Associates PA with headquarters in Saint Paul, Minnesota. He is best known for litigating cases involving child sexual abuse by the Catholic clergy beginning in the 1980s and for using media events to encourage child sexual abuse victims to speak out.

== Personal life ==
Anderson was born on August 27, 1947, in Minneapolis, Minnesota. Raised in suburban Edina, his mother stayed at home while his father worked as a furniture salesman for Dayton's department store. He married Julie Aronson in 1987. His children were raised in the Catholic faith, although Anderson became an atheist in the 1980s while he worked with legal cases involving sexual abuse. He returned to organized religion in the 1990s, and also attended Alcoholics Anonymous meetings at that time.

== Career ==
Jeff Anderson founded Jeff Anderson & Associates in November 1981. At the time, the firm focused on cases related to civil rights and poverty law.

In 1983, Anderson became a defense attorney for Greg Riedle, a minor who had been convicted of molesting a younger child. Riedle informed his parents he had learned his behavior from being sexually abused by Rev. Thomas Adamson while serving as an altar boy at St. Thomas Aquinas Catholic Church in St. Paul Park, Minnesota. Previous to hiring Anderson, the Riedles had informed their bishop of their son's allegations. Finding the bishop's response inadequate, the Riedles approached Anderson.

Anderson launched a lawsuit against the Catholic Church after conducting an investigation that convinced him there had been a cover-up that went "...all the way to the archbishop." This was the first case of childhood sexual abuse brought against a Catholic diocese in America. In 1984, after church officials denied in depositions that they had known of the priest's history of sexual abuse, the Archdiocese of Saint Paul and Minneapolis reportedly offered over $1 million to settle the case. Anderson, who was troubled by the church's insistence on confidentiality, talked Riedle out of taking the offer, and instead filed suit and called a press conference. Following the case, Anderson focused on pursuing claims on behalf of survivors of childhood sex abuse.

Throughout the 1980s and 1990s, Anderson filed over 200 suits against religious organizations, a majority of them being sex-abuse complaints against the Catholic Church. Jeff Anderson & Associates has additional offices in California, New Jersey, and New York. Anderson's firm has taken on cases in Australia, Brussels, Belgium, and Mexico. They have since opened an office in London and have hired a barrister in Ireland. In 2010, Anderson filed several lawsuits that challenged the protected status of the Holy See under the Foreign Sovereign Immunities Act.

== Results ==
In a settlement with Saint John's Abbey in Collegeville, Minnesota, Anderson stipulated that the names of 17 monks with "credible allegations of sexual abuse" be released in addition to an undisclosed dollar amount on behalf of his nine plaintiffs. In March 2011, the abbey released the list of names. Four were dead, three were no longer with the abbey, and the others live at the abbey "with the constraints of a safety plan and supervision" as per the terms of the settlement, according to a letter from the abbot, John Klassen. At the time of the list's release, none of the 17 had been criminally charged. In January 2016, the personnel files of 18 "credibly accused" monks were released as part of another settlement agreement in 2015.

Anderson has said that only a very small percentage of cases were actually brought based on recovered memories dredged up during therapy or under hypnosis.

In a 2010 interview with the New York Times, Anderson said he considers what he does part of the child civil rights movement.

=== Notable cases ===
Since the 1980s, Jeff Anderson & Associates have filed thousands of cases on behalf of survivors of childhood sexual abuse, including that of John Doe 1-22 v. Roman Catholic Bishop of Fall River, Diocese of Crookston, Servants of the Paraclete, and James Porter. This was filed in 1992, the case brought by 22 survivors who had been abused by Fr James Porter. The plaintiffs were among hundreds of survivors who came forward. The case was settled in 2001 after nine years of litigation.

Anderson's other notable cases include:

- John Doe, a.k.a. James and John Howard v. Catholic Bishop of Stockton. In 1998, a jury awarded $24 million in punitive damages and $6 million in compensatory damages to John and James Howard, who were abused by Fr. Oliver O'Grady. A letter written by O'Grady in which he admitted to abusing children proved that the Los Angeles Cardinal Archbishop Roger Mahony and other Archdiocesan officials were aware of O’Grady's crimes. At the time, it was the largest verdict against the Catholic Church in California.
- Bill Weis v. Diocese of Duluth. In November 2015, a Ramsey County jury awarded Bill Weis a $4.9 million verdict. Documents showed the Diocese of Duluth knew about childhood sexual abuse claims against Fr. J. Vincent Fitzgerald and allowed him to continue working with children. The Diocese of Duluth filed for bankruptcy after the verdict.
- Laura Stearns v. The Children’s Theatre Company and Jason McLean. Laura Stearns filed a claim against the Children's Theatre Company for sexual abuse she endured as a child by former teacher Jason McLean. McLean was accused of childhood sex abuse by Stearns and several other former theatre students. The jury found the Children's Theatre Company negligent but not liable and decided it should be McLean who pays for the damage caused to Stearns.
- Gregory Riedle, et al. v. The Diocese of Winona, The Archdiocese of Saint Paul and Minneapolis, St. Thomas Aquinas in St. Paul Park, and Thomas Adamson. Filed in 1984, the case was the first lawsuit of childhood sexual abuse against a Catholic diocese. Gregory Riedle was abused for approximately two years by Fr. Thomas Adamson while serving as an altar boy at St. Thomas Aquinas Catholic Church of St. Paul Park. The case became public in 1987 and was eventually settled out of court.
- Thomas Mrozka v. The Archdiocese of Saint Paul and Minneapolis, et al. The case also involved childhood sexual abuse perpetrated by Fr. Thomas Adamson. A jury awarded the survivor, Thomas Mrozka, $855,000 in compensation and $2.7 million in punitive damages. A trial court later reduced the punitive damages.
- Darryl Bassile v. Covenant House, et al. Darryl Bassile says he was sexually assaulted numerous times between 1973 and 1974 by Covenant House founder Fr. Bruce Ritter. The case was dismissed in 1993 because of the statute of limitations.
- Tietge v. Western Province of the Servítes, Inc. In 1997, a California appeals court partially reversed a trial court ruling that dismissed Michael Tietge's sexual abuse claim by Br. Gregory Atherton because of the statute of limitations. Due to a change in law that extended the statute of limitations, Tietge had the opportunity to pursue a case against Atherton, but not the religious order.

== Public image ==
Critics have called Anderson a headline chaser and a self-promoter. He has been accused of baiting the media with the heartbreaking stories of his clients. Some in the legal community refer to his role as co-counsel in so many abuse cases around the country as "the Jeff Anderson franchise system."

"Rather than settle out of court and seal the record, Jeff has learned the church is impervious to all but the most intense pressure," wrote Anson D. Shupe, a sociologist at Indiana University-Purdue University, author of the book Rogue Clerics: The Social Problem of Clergy Deviance. Matt Carroll of The Boston Globe described Anderson as "one of the foremost attorneys in this area."

In 2002, the Washington Post wrote that Anderson himself estimated that his firm was responsible for total recoveries that amounted in excess of $60 million.

== Controversy ==
=== Boy Scouts' "perversion files" ===
In 2012, Jeff Anderson & Associates uncovered a trove of the Boy Scouts' "perversion files." A lawsuit that year had prompted the Boy Scouts to release the confidential files of over 1,200 known or suspected child abusers. The files dated back to 1944 and contained the names of 12,254 survivors of childhood sex abuse and identified nearly 8,000 perpetrators believed to have sexually abused children. The company attempted to make the files public, but were forced to return the copies they had obtained after a court sided with the Boy Scouts of America in 2019.
