= Ann Olivarius =

British lawyer (born 1955)

Ann Marie Olivarius OBE KC
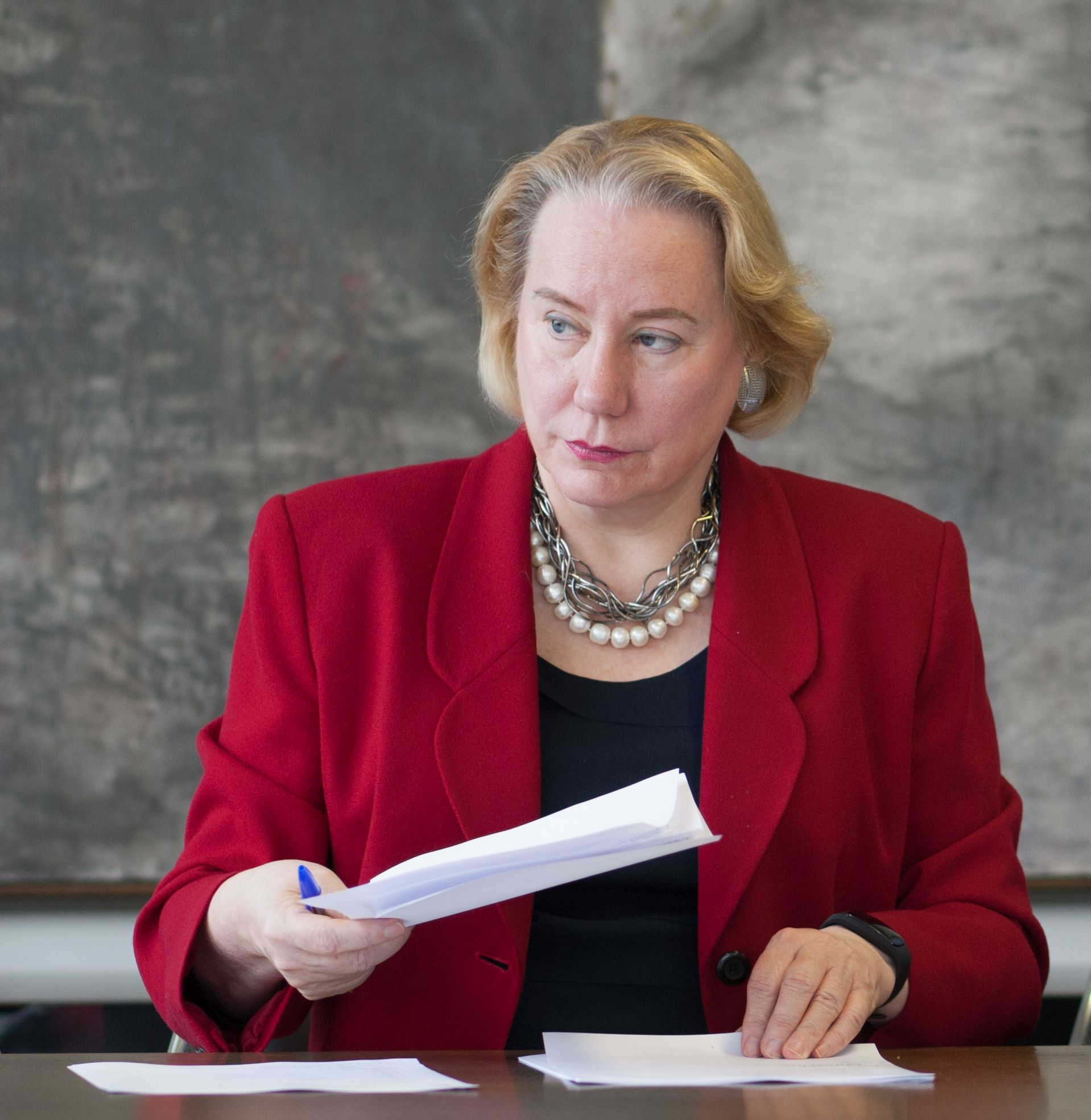
- Olivarius in 2017
- Born: 19 February 1955 (age 71); Brooklyn, New York, US
- Education: Yale University (BA, JD, MBA); Somerville College, Oxford (DPhil)
- Occupations: Chair of the Executive Committee, McAllister Olivarius
- Years active: 1986–present
- Spouse: Jef McAllister (married 1981)
- Children: 2 daughters, 1 son
- Website: www.annolivarius.com

Ann Olivarius OBE KC (Hon) (born 19 February 1955) is an American-British lawyer who specializes in cases of civil litigation, sexual discrimination, and sexual harassment, assault, and abuse.

== Early life and education ==
Ann Olivarius grew up in New Jersey, the eldest of five daughters of Kenneth and Ann Olivarius. She was educated at Yale University, where she was a founding member of the Yale Undergraduate Women's Caucus during the mid-1970s. In her junior year, she worked for the Office of the Administrative Assistant to the Chief Justice of the Supreme Court of the United States, Warren E. Burger.

Olivarius graduated summa cum laude from Yale in 1977 and was elected to Phi Beta Kappa. She received a Rhodes Scholarship to study at Oxford University in 1978, the second year the program admitted women. At Oxford, Olivarius pursued a D.Phil. in economics at Somerville College, where her thesis was entitled Working Democracy: Analysis and prospects of British worker co-operatives. In 1981, she married Jef McAllister, whom she had met at Yale. In 1986, Olivarius graduated from Yale with a combined MBA and JD which she finished in three years, completing her final year while pregnant.

=== Alexander v. Yale ===
During her senior year as an undergraduate, she was asked by the Yale Corp. to survey women at Yale on their experiences, which led her to hear repeated stories about women who were pressured by professors into having sex. As a result, Olivarius sued the school as a part of Alexander v. Yale alongside other students and a professor for what The New Yorker describes as "quid-pro-quo sexual harassment by professors, a hostile environment, and a lack of reporting procedures." The case was eventually dismissed due to lack of standing since, by the time the judge ruled, most of the plaintiffs had graduated. However, Yale still created sexual harassment protections as a result, and the case was the first to hold that it was illegal for universities to ignore sexual harassment of students. Olivarius helped coin the phrase "date rape" during the process, which she publicized through a series of talks at the college and elsewhere in the US and England.

== Career ==
Olivarius is a co-founder of the trans-Atlantic law firm AO Advocates, which represents victims of childhood sexual abuse, and chair of the executive committee and senior partner at McAllister Olivarius. As a lawyer, she is known for representing victims of sexual harassment and sexual assault. This has included representing victims of nonconsensual pornography and other internet-based privacy violations, such as a precedent-setting case representing YouTube personality Chrissy Chambers. Olivarius represented a group of professors and students at the University of Rochester, of which two plaintiffs, Celeste Kidd and Jessica Cantlon, were named "Persons of the Year" by Time magazine in its cover story "Silence Breakers" in 2017.

Olivarius has represented victims of other forms of discrimination. In 2017, she represented a British Sikh couple, who were turned away from an adoption agency because only white children were available, in a case against The Royal Borough of Windsor and Maidenhead that was supported by the Equality and Human Rights Commission. In 2019, she filed a lawsuit on behalf of plaintiffs against Mount Sinai Medical School alleging age and sex discrimination.

In 2017, the British academic journal Nature named Olivarius as one of "Nature’s 10" people who mattered in science because of her work fighting sexual harassment at universities. That year she also became a Donaldson Fellow at the Yale School of Management, citing her as "a groundbreaking civil rights litigator".

Olivarius established The Rhodes Project to study the lives and careers of Rhodes Scholars. In 2012, the American Civil Liberties Union (ACLU) included her in its list of nine most influential people in the history of Title IX. She received the Yale Women Lifetime Achievement Award from the Yale Alumni Association in 2019. Nelson Mandela praised Olivarius as "a lawyer who has advised me well and who has courageously advanced the cause of justice, and improved life opportunities, for hundreds of millions of women, blacks and disadvantaged, worldwide." She has served on the boards of openDemocracy, Autistica, and Women Moving Millions and is a founding member of the UK Women's Equality Party.

In December 2022, Olivarius was approved as Honorary King's Counsel for her "leading role in the fields of women's rights, sexual harassment and sexual abuse. On 31 December 2022, she was awarded Officer of the Order of the British Empire (OBE) in the 2023 New Year Honours for services to justice and to women and equality.

== Personal life ==
Olivarius' spouse and law partner, Jef McAllister previously served as the Diplomatic Correspondent, White House Correspondent and London Bureau Chief for Time magazine.
