= Frankie (magazine) =

Bi-monthly Australian magazine

- Issue 43
- Editor: Shannon Jenkins
- Categories: Women, Culture, Art, Design, Style, Fashion,
- Frequency: Bi-monthly
- Publisher: Nextmedia
- Total circulation: 58,631
- Founded: 2004
- Country: Australia
- Based in: Melbourne
- Language: English
- Website: frankie.com.au
- ISSN: 1449-7794

Frankie, styled as frankie, is a bi-monthly Australian magazine that features music, art, fashion, photography, craft and other cultural content.

In 2012, it was awarded Australian Magazine of the Year at the Australian Magazine Awards, as well as winning out over both Vogue and Harper's Bazaar for the Australian Fashion Magazine of The Year.

== History and profile ==
frankie was launched in October 2004 by editor Louise Bannister and creative director Lara Burke.

In early 2008, Bannister was replaced by Jo Walker as editor, and Bannister became publisher. Walker was promoted to editor-in-chief in May 2016, and left the company in September 2018.

Sophie Kalagas, who joined the magazine in 2013 as assistant editor and online editor, was the magazine's current editor until Aug 2021, when she left to pursue new opportunities and was replaced by assistant editor Emma Do.

Frankie celebrated its 100th issue in February 2021.

frankie is owned and published by Australian magazine publisher Nextmedia, which bought its niche publisher, Morrison Media, from Pacific Star Network in September 2018 for AUD $2.4 million.

In November 2014, Pacific Star Network had paid AUD $10 million to acquire Morrison Media and its chief entity "frankie press", which published frankie, men's publication Smith Journal, plus books and annuals. Both founders of the magazine, Louise Bannister and Lara Burke, left the magazine before the Pacific Star acquisition.

The magazine was headquartered in Queensland until 2013 when it was relocated in Melbourne.

== Readership ==
The magazine's audience has grown rapidly since its inception. As of March 2019 it is estimated to be read by 335,000 globally. Despite the 2008 financial crisis that led to a 3% drop in Australian magazine sales, frankie's circulation rose by 31.60% in 2009, making frankie the fastest growing magazine in Australia during that period. The publication continued this trend in 2010, when circulation rose another 43.20%, according to the Australian Bureau of Circulation's January–June 2010 audit figures. This was the second year in a row that frankie had the highest growth out of all Australian magazines. In comparison, Harper's Bazaar had an increase of 9.04% over the same time period.

However, following Morrison Media's 2014 sale to Pacific Star Network the magazine's circulation dropped in 2015 for the first time in its history: a 3.5% drop from 63,645 copies in 2014 to 61,427. This was a difficult period for magazines targeted to young women; Dolly, Cleo, Girlfriend and Total Girl all saw their circulations slump.

By February 2017, when fewer than 20 circulation-audited magazine titles remained in Australia, frankie's circulation had slid by 5.4% to 50,167.

frankie has significant social media impact: in 2015 it had a strong online component and steadily increased its popularity on Facebook, Instagram and its dedicated iPad app. In March 2020 it had over 358,000 Facebook fans and 73,700 Twitter followers.

== Content ==
The magazine's content features DIY and vintage culture as well as music, art, fashion, photography, craft, humour, hipster culture, illustration and design. It has a distinctively feminine, hand-crafted aesthetic.

ABC's 7:30 Report described frankie as being between "quite edgy" and "quite daggy", having a strong emphasis on strong, curious stories instead of diets and celebrity culture, supporting emerging artists, musicians, entrepreneurs and designers and preferring to profile up-and-coming hipsters rather than existing ones.

Its senior contributors have included broadcaster and writer Marieke Hardy, and author Benjamin Law.

== Other publications ==
In addition to its magazine and website, frankie has also published a series of books through its imprint, frankie press. These include two recipe books, "Afternoon Tea" and "Sweet Treats", an anthology of frankie magazine photography called "Photo Album", a book series on creative and collaborative areas called "Spaces", a showcase of Australian craftspeople called "Look What We Made", and a "Gift Paper Book".

frankie also brings out a calendar and a diary annually, which have both sold out every year to date.

In 2011 frankie launched a quarterly publication, titled Smith Journal. Smith Journal was part of the sale of Morrison Media to Nextmedia but ceased publication in December 2019.

== Staff ==
- Editor Shannon Jenkins
- Creative Director Alice Buda
- Designer Caitlyn Bendall
- Partnerships Director Claire Mullins
- Branded Content Director Emily Naismith
- Production and Office Manager Lizzie Dynon
- Digital and Assistant Editor Elle Burnard
- Marketing Coordinator Iris McPherson
- Digital Marketing Manager Kelsey Caruana
