= Sports Entertainment Group =

Australian media company

- Formation: 1994
- Type: Publicly listed company
- Headquarters: Melbourne, Victoria, Australia
- CEO: Craig Hutchison
- Chairman: Craig Coleman
- Board of directors: Colm O'Brien; Andrew Moffat; Ronald Hall; Chris Giannopoulos
- Website: sportsentertainmentnetwork.com.au
- Formerly called: Ledge Group Limited (1994); Media Technology Corporation Limited (1994–2000); Data and Commerce Limited (2000–2004); Pacific Star Network Limited (2004–2020)

Sports Entertainment Group (SEG), formerly Pacific Star Network, is an Australian sports media content and entertainment business. SEG is the owner and parent company of Sports Entertainment Network (SEN).

== History ==
After going through a number of name changes in the 1990s and early 2000s, the company was known as Pacific Star Network for 16 years.

In December 2014, Pacific Star Network acquired Morrison Media Services, the publisher of Frankie Magazine and Smith Journal. They sold Morrison Media Services to Nextmedia in September 2018.

In January 2018, Pacific Star Network acquired 100 per cent of equity in Crocmedia. In September 2020, Pacific Star Network rebranded Crocmedia as Sports Entertainment Network (SEN). Two months later, Pacific Star Network changed its name to Sports Entertainment Group (SEG).

In September 2023, it was reported that SEG posted a $9.2 million loss in the 2022–23 financial year. The company reportedly asked for covenant relief from the bank in the June quarter. In November 2023, it was reported that SEG required a cash injection or new investors in the next nine months to survive. To finish the year, SEG sold 3.75 per cent of their sporting teams business, SEN Teams, and received $1.5 million in investor funds from new individual shareholders.

In August 2026, SEG agreed terms to purchase MediaWorks New Zealand. The transaction was completed in October 2026.

== SEN Teams ==
SEG's sporting teams business, SEN Teams, is a shareholder of and operationally responsible for three franchises as of January 2026.

Under Pacific Star Network and Crocmedia, the company owned 25 percent of National Basketball League (NBL) team Melbourne United between 2018 and 2021.

In July 2021, SEG purchased rival NBL team the Perth Wildcats for roughly $8.5 million. In November 2021, SEG's New Zealand subsidiary purchased New Zealand National Basketball League (NZNBL) team the Otago Nuggets. In March 2022, SEN unveiled the Southern Hoiho for the inaugural Tauihi Basketball Aotearoa season. SEN Teams purchased Women's National Basketball League (WNBL) team the Bendigo Spirit in April 2022 and acquired a Super Netball team licence in July 2023, which became the Melbourne Mavericks.

In May 2024, Basketball Australia granted SEN Teams permission to run a second WNBL club. On 13 June 2024, the Perth Lynx's WNBL licence was transferred to Perth Lynx Pty Ltd, an organisation owned by SEN Teams investors Christian Hauff and Jodi Millhahn. On 10 December 2024, SEN Teams took over from Hauff and Millhahn as majority owners of the Lynx. SEG chief executive Craig Hutchison later revealed the timing of the sale of the Perth Wildcats prevented SEN Teams from completing a deal to own the Perth Lynx earlier in 2024.

In July 2024, SEG agreed to sell 90% of their 95% shareholder ownership of the Perth Wildcats to MT Arena Capital Investment at an estimated value of $40 million. On 14 August 2024, SEG officially sold 52.5 per cent of the club for $21 million to WA businessman Mark Arena. SEG subsequently shifted to the position of minority shareholders of the Wildcats. Arena was set at the time to provide another payment of $15 million in 2026 to receive an extra 37.5 per cent and then buy the entire club in 2028.

In March 2025, SEG announced its intention to exit its involvement in both the Southern Hoiho and Otago Nuggets basketball teams, effective at the conclusion of the 2025 New Zealand NBL season. On 6 June 2025, it was announced that SEG would transfer ownership of the Hoiho and Nuggets to a collective of local Dunedin community supporters on 31 July 2025.

In January 2026, SEG exited as owners of the Perth Wildcats after Mark Arena completed the remaining tranches of his ownership transaction.

In August 2026, SEG acquired the license for Giants Netball.

== Assets ==
- BallPark Entertainment
- Bravo Management
  - Precision Sports and Entertainment Group
- Sports Entertainment Network
  - AFL Record
  - 6EL
  - 1116 SEN
  - 693 SENQ
  - SEN SA
  - SEN Track
  - Sports Entertainment Network New Zealand (SENZ)
  - SEN Teams
    - Bendigo Spirit (WNBL)
    - Giants Netball (Super Netball)
    - Melbourne Mavericks (Super Netball)
    - Perth Lynx (WNBL)
- Rainmaker / Rapid TV
