= Teigan O'Shannassy =

Australian netball player

Personal information
- Born: 14 April 1999 (age 27) Sydney, New South Wales
- Height: 1.87 m (6 ft 2 in)
- School: Stella Maris College (Manly)

Netball career
- Playing positions: GD, GK
Years	Club team	Apps
2019–2021	Giants Netball	1
2022-2026	NSW Swifts	47
2027-	Sydney Sirens	

Teigan O’Shannassy (born 14 April 1999) is an Australian netball player in the Suncorp Super Netball league, playing for Sydney Sirens.

O’Shannassy represented Australia at the 2017 Netball World Youth Cup. In 2018, she claimed a silver medal with the Canberra Giants in the Australian Netball League. Later that year, while representing the New South Wales Institute of Sport at the 2018 Netball New Zealand Super Club tournament, she suffered a serious Achilles injury. Having spent the previous two years as a training partner with the extended GIANTS Netball squad, O’Shannassy was elevated to the GIANTS’ senior team ahead of the 2019 season, despite the injury setback.

In 2022, Teigan O’Shannassy informed the GIANTS that she would depart the club at the end of the season, having signed a contract with the NSW Swifts. She joined the Swifts alongside her Manly Warringah Sapphires teammate Kelly Singleton, who was elevated into the Swifts’ contracted 10 for the 2022 season following Sophie Garbin’s departure.

At the end of the 2026 season, O'Shannassy announced her departure from the NSW Swifts. She signed with new franchise Sydney Sirens for the 2027 season, alongside former Swifts teammate Grace Nweke.
