= One Tree Hill season 7 =

One Tree Hill
- Season 7
- One Tree Hill Season 7 DVD cover
- No. of episodes: 22

Release
- Original network: The CW
- Original release: September 14, 2009 – May 17, 2010

Season chronology
- ← Previous; Season 6 Next → Season 8

The seventh season of One Tree Hill premiered on September 14, 2009. This is the first season not to include the show's original cast members Chad Michael Murray and Hilarie Burton. After successful ratings for the first three episodes, The CW gave the series a full-season order of 22 episodes.

The season premiere was seen by 2.45 million viewers and achieved a 1.2 rating in Adults 18–49. Episode 7 achieved season highs with 2.67 million viewers and a 1.3 rating in Adults 18–49. The season averaged 2.28 million viewers and a 1.1 rating placing it at #115 in the 2009–10 season.

== Cast and characters ==
=== Main ===
- James Lafferty as Nathan Scott
- Bethany Joy Galeotti as Haley James Scott
- Sophia Bush as Brooke Davis
- Austin Nichols as Julian Baker
- Robert Buckley as Clay Evans
- Shantel VanSanten as Quinn James
- Jackson Brundage as Jamie Scott
- Lee Norris as Mouth McFadden
- Antwon Tanner as Skills Taylor
- Lisa Goldstein as Millicent Huxtable
- Paul Johansson as Dan Scott
- Jana Kramer as Alex Dupré

=== Recurring ===
- Daphne Zuniga as Victoria Davis
- India de Beaufort as Miranda Stone
- Danneel Harris as Rachel Gatina
- Allison Munn as Lauren
- Gregory Harrison as Paul Norris
- Stephen Colletti as Chase Adams
- Kate French as Renee Richardson
- Amanda Schull as Katie Ryan and Sara Evans
- Paul Teal as Avery
- Scott Holroyd as David Lee Fletcher
- Kate Voegele as Mia Catalano
- Lindsey McKeon as Taylor James
- Sasha Jackson as Kylie Frost
- Bess Armstrong as Lydia James
- Cullen Moss as Junk Moretti
- Vaughn Wilson as Fergie Thompson
- Katherine Landry as Madison
- Jaden Harmon as Andre Fields
- Bradley Evans as Jerry
- Michael Grubbs as Grubbs
- Mitch Ryan as Alexander Coyne
- Michael May as Chuck Scolnik
- Andrea Moore as Makenna Gage

=== Special guest star ===
- Joe Manganiello as Owen Morello
- Candice Patton as Tanisha
- Noisettes as themselves
- Cheap Trick as themselves
- Jerry Rice as himself

== Episodes ==
No. overall	No. in season	Title	Directed by	Written by	Original release date	Prod. code	U.S. viewers (millions)
131	1	"4:30 AM (Apparently They Were Traveling Abroad)"	Clark Mathis	Mark Schwahn	September 14, 2009	3X5301	2.45
An accusation threatens Nathan's NBA career, much to the chagrin of his sports agent Clay. Brooke prepares to launch a new fashion line, and Julian decides to produce a big movie. Haley's older sister Quinn makes a surprise visit. Mouth wants Skills to move out, though Skills refuses which leads to a naked standoff. Meanwhile, Jamie celebrates his 7th birthday. This episode is named after a song by Roger Waters.
132	2	"What Are You Willing to Lose?"	Les Butler	Mark Schwahn	September 21, 2009	3X5302	2.29
Since Peyton has been gone for a year, Haley has to do everything in her power to protect Red Room records with the help of Mia as they make her new album. Brooke casts the new face of her clothing line, though her personality turns out to be what Brooke hadn't expected. Clay defends Nathan against a growing scandal. Julian and Brooke decide to move in together. Julian's father visits. Meanwhile, Dan unveils his new bride, Rachel Gatina. This episode is named after a song by Lucero.
133	3	"Hold My Hand as I'm Lowered"	Liz Friedlander	Mark Schwahn	September 28, 2009	3X5303	2.51
Clay and Nathan disagree on how to handle an ever-worsening scandal. Quinn and Brooke organize a photo shoot, and Mouth ups the stakes in his battle with Skills. Meanwhile, Alex makes Julian an interesting proposition. This episode is named after a song by Noah and the Whale.
134	4	"Believe Me, I'm Lying"	Greg Prange	John A. Norris	October 5, 2009	3X5304	2.13
Nathan's scandal becomes public. Brooke's fashion show brings an unexpected responsibility for Millicent, and Haley convinces Quinn to talk to her estranged husband David. Meanwhile, Mouth makes a decision that could threaten his career. At Brooke's fashion show, Clay gets into a fist fight with Quinn's husband. This episode is named after a song by Forever the Sickest Kids.
135	5	"Your Cheatin' Heart"	Peter B. Kowalski	Mike Herro & David Strauss	October 12, 2009	3X5305	2.55
Haley is thrust into the spotlight and storm of Nathan's growing scandal. Against her better judgment, Brooke allows Julian to continue working with Alex. Millicent gets a new job, which may cause trouble for Mouth. Meanwhile, Clay and Quinn grow closer. This episode is named after a song by Hank Williams.
136	6	"Deep Ocean Vast Sea"	Janice Cooke	Mike Daniels	October 19, 2009	3X5306	2.21
While Haley begins to wonder if Renee's accusations have merit, Nathan's scandal threatens his endorsement deals and so Haley considers taking matters into her own hands. Julian gives Alex another chance, and a jealous Brooke reconnects with Chase. Millicent questions whether she has what it takes to be a model. Meanwhile, Clay lets Quinn in on a big secret. This episode is named after a song by Peter Murphy.
137	7	"I and Love and You"	James Lafferty	Mark Schwahn	October 26, 2009	3X5307	2.67
Nathan and Haley are dealing with the fact that Dan has invited Renee onto his show, where she will undoubtedly air out the young Scott's dirty laundry. Quinn contemplates where her marriage with David went wrong, while Brooke has to admit to Julian what her future plans and dreams are. Clay must deal with his past when Sara comes to town. This episode is named after a song and album by The Avett Brothers.
138	8	"(I Just) Died in Your Arms Tonight"	Michael J. Leone	Terrence Coli	November 2, 2009	3X5308	2.32
Julian agrees to a weekend camping trip but struggles to fit in with Nathan and the guys. Back in Tree Hill, Brooke and Haley spend Girl's Night doing a little bonding of their own, and Quinn helps Clay come to terms with a tragic loss. Meanwhile, Dan and Rachel's past catches up to them. This episode is named after a song by Cutting Crew.
139	9	"Now You Lift Your Eyes to the Sun"	Sophia Bush	Karen Gist	November 9, 2009	3X5309	2.67
Haley returns to the stage and Brooke receives life-changing news. Meanwhile, Dan Scott returns to Tree Hill much to the chagrin of Nathan, who is about to sign a new NBA contract with the help of his agent Clay. Quinn and Clay grow closer. This episode is named after a song by Stars of Track and Field.
140	10	"You Are a Runner and I Am My Father's Son"	Paul Johansson	Mark Schwahn	November 16, 2009	3X5310	2.63
Nathan reaches the breaking point with Clay, causing a rift between Haley and Quinn. Brooke comes clean with Julian about her worries regarding his growing connection to Alex. Meanwhile, Skills pursues a new career in LA and Millicent's drug problem worsens. This episode is named after a song by Wolf Parade.
141	11	"You Know I Love You, Don't You?"	Greg Prange	William H. Brown	November 30, 2009	3X5311	2.40
Nathan and Haley's careers bring about a tough decision for the family, and Julian divulges a secret to Alex that leads to a confrontation with Brooke. Meanwhile, Clay tries to resuscitate his career as an agent, and Jamie learns the truth about Skills' new job. And a fresh-from-jail Millie finds an unlikely supporter in Victoria. After a shocking conversation with Julian, Alex leaves her suicide note on his voice mail. This episode is named after a song by Howard Jones.
142	12	"Some Roads Lead Nowhere"	Mark Schwahn	Mark Schwahn	December 7, 2009	3X5312	2.57
Quinn helps Clay form a plan to convince Nathan to rehire him, but they may be too late as Nathan and Haley prepare to leave Tree Hill behind in their move to Barcelona. Brooke struggles to accept Julian's reaction when Alex undergoes another crisis. Meanwhile, Millie's downward spiral threatens her relationship with Mouth, and Dan makes an announcement that shocks Rachel and his studio audience. This episode is named after a song by Matthew Ryan.
143	13	"Weeks Go by Like Days"	Joe Davola	Karin Gist	January 18, 2010	3X5313	2.18
Three months have passed since the events of the Fall Finale, Haley, Nathan and Jamie return from tour, but are in for a shock when Taylor (Haley and Quinn's oldest sister) returns, and she brings a familiar face with her. Millie goes in front of the judge for her DUI. Scenes from Haley's concerts are also featured. This episode is named after a song by My Morning Jacket.
144	14	"Family Affair"	Paul Johansson	Mike Herro & David Strauss	January 25, 2010	3X5314	2.20
Nathan tries to keep Haley calm after Taylor shows up at their house with Quinn's ex-husband in town. Julian sticks up for Alex on the set of their movie, and Brooke leans on Alexander to ease her heartache. Meanwhile, Clay gets a chance to prove his commitment to Quinn by helping her through a dinner with her sister and David. This episode is named after a song by Sly and the Family Stone.
145	15	"Don't You Forget About Me"	Les Butler	Terrence Coli	February 1, 2010	3X5315	2.14
In the chaos surrounding an '80s alumni dance at the high school, Haley's birthday is forgotten, Jamie is left home alone, and Nathan and Clay are stranded 200 miles from Tree Hill. Meanwhile, Brooke's appearance at the dance with Alexander forces Julian to relive his dorky adolescence in an episode dedicated to the memory of John Hughes. This episode is named after a song by Simple Minds.
146	16	"My Attendance Is Bad But My Intentions Are Good"	Jessica Landaw	Nikki Schiefelbein	February 8, 2010	3X5316	2.17
Haley, Quinn and Taylor receive life-changing news when their widowed mom, Lydia shows up to town. Brooke and Julian try to find a balance between their personal lives and work as the movie shoot begins. Alex sets her sights on Alexander, and Millicent finds herself struggling with temptation. This episode is named after a song by PlayRadioPlay!
147	17	"At the Bottom of Everything"	Bethany Joy Lenz	John A. Norris	February 15, 2010	3X5317	1.86
Nathan tries to help Haley and Jamie confront Lydia's seemingly hopeless situation, while Brooke and Julian navigate their volatile relationship in the midst of a hectic movie shoot. Meanwhile, Clay and Quinn spend some time apart, and Miranda tries to prove to Grubbs that she's the right person to produce his album. Owen returns to help Millicent with a recent problem. This episode is named after a song by Bright Eyes.
148	18	"The Last Day of Our Acquaintance"	Joe Davola	Mike Daniels	February 22, 2010	3X5318	2.23
As Brooke angrily deals with Alex's tryst with Julian, Lydia's condition worsens, prompting Quinn and Haley to try to reconnect with Taylor. Clay is forced to deal with Katie's unsettling advances, and Nathan helps Jamie come to terms with Lydia's impending death. This episode is named after a song by Sinéad O'Connor.
149	19	"Every Picture Tells a Story"	Chad Graves	William H. Brown	April 26, 2010	3X5319	2.01
On the eve of Quinn's big gallery opening, an uninvited guest ambushes Clay. Nathan spends the day with Jamie, while Haley struggles with life after her mother's death. Brooke and Julian each receive a shocking surprise. Meanwhile, Skills learns the truth about Lauren and Mouth. This episode is named after a song by Rod Stewart.
150	20	"Learning to Fall"	Greg Prange	Shaina Fewell & Renee Intlekofer	May 3, 2010	3X5320	1.94
Haley struggles THE hardest with the aftermath of her mother's death, while Brooke deals with the fallout of Alexander's tryst with Victoria. Alex discovers a secret about her leading man, Josh, that could derail Julian's film, and Clay is confronted by an unhinged Katie. This episode is named after a song by Boys Like Girls.
151	21	"What's in the Ground Belongs to You"	Peter B. Kowalski	Mark Schwahn	May 10, 2010	3X5321	2.09
Nathan struggles to reach an increasingly depressed Haley, while Quinn leads Jamie on a Tree Hill treasure hunt. Julian shows his finished film to Brooke, and Clay is forced to deal with Katie. This episode is named after a song by If These Trees Could Talk.
152	22	"Almost Everything I Wish I'd Said the Last Time I Saw You"	Mark Schwahn	Mark Schwahn	May 17, 2010	3X5322	2.02
Haley tries to overcome her depression by joining Nathan, Jamie and the rest of the Tree Hill gang on a trip to Utah for the premiere of Julian's film. Julian's film is a huge hit, Haley discovers some good news, Julian takes a huge step in his relationship with Brooke, and someone returns and does something that make sure Clay is single forever. This episode is named after an album by Wakey!Wakey!

== Production ==
On February 25, 2009, The CW renewed One Tree Hill for a seventh season. On May 12, 2009, it was confirmed that both Chad Michael Murray and Hilarie Burton would not be returning for the seventh season. On June 8, 2009, it was announced that the seventh season will occur a year into the future from the sixth season finale.

On September 29, 2009, The CW ordered a full season, set to total at 22 episodes.

== Cast ==
This season includes three new characters portrayed by Robert Buckley, Shantel VanSanten, and Jana Kramer. Buckley is featured as Clayton, Nathan's agent and friend. VanSanten is featured as Haley's sister Quinn James. Kramer is featured as Alex, a model for Brooke fashion line, "Clothes Over Bros".

Returning are both Austin Nichols who plays Julian Baker a character introduced in the sixth season and Danneel Harris who had previously portrayed bad girl Rachel Gatina. Nichols has been promoted to a series regular while Harris will be recurring for at least seven episodes, beginning with the second episode of the seventh season. In an interview with new cast member Shantel VanSanten, she had noted the return of Lindsey McKeon as Taylor James, the sister of Haley and Quinn, midway through the season.

While speaking on the return of Taylor, VanSanten also revealed that her character's mother, played by Bess Armstrong will also return.

== Reception ==
The season averaged 2.28 million viewers and a 1.1 average Adults 18–49 rating placing it at #115 in the 2009–10 season.

== DVD release ==
The DVD release of season seven was released after the season has completed broadcast on television. It has been released in Region 1 and Region 2 and Region 4. As well as every episode from the season, the DVD release features bonus material such as audio commentaries on some episodes from the creator and cast, deleted scenes, gag reels and behind-the-scenes featurettes.

The Complete Seventh Season
Set details			Special features
22 episodes; 924 minutes (Region 1); 928 minutes (Region 2); 886 minutes (Region 4); 5-disc set; 1.78:1 aspect ratio; Languages: English (Dolby Digital 5.1); Subtitles: English, Spanish French (Region 1)			Audio commentaries; "I and Love and You" – with creator/executive producer/writer Mark Schwahn, and actor(s) James Lafferty and Robert Buckley; "Almost Everything I Wish I'd Said the Last Time I Saw You" – with creator/executive producer/writer Mark Schwahn, and actor(s) James Lafferty, Stephen Colletti and Robert Buckley; Deleted scenes; Episodes: 2, 12, 16, 17, 18, 22; Gag reel; "Return to Camp One Tree Hill: The experiences of newcomers Robert Buckley, India DeBeaufort, Jana Kramer and Shantel VanSanten; "Spring Break with One Tree Hill: Two contest winners are put through their paces working as production assistants on spring break; "OTH – The Director's Debut: Following First-Time Helmer Sophia Bush"
Release dates
United States	United Kingdom	Australia	
August 17, 2010	October 11, 2010	May 4, 2011	
