= One Tree Hill season 6 =

One Tree Hill
- Season 6
- One Tree Hill Season 6 DVD cover
- No. of episodes: 24

Release
- Original network: The CW
- Original release: September 1, 2008 – May 18, 2009

Season chronology
- ← Previous; Season 5 Next → Season 7

The sixth season of One Tree Hill, an American television series, began on September 1, 2008, and concluded on May 18, 2009, with a total of 24 episodes. This is the third season to air on The CW television network. The season's seventh episode, "Messin' with the Kid" achieved a series high in Adults 18–34 with a 2.7 rating.

Season six is the final season for original main cast members Chad Michael Murray and Hilarie Burton. Their characters, Lucas and Peyton, leave Tree Hill with their newborn baby in the finale. Chad Michael Murray would later make a guest appearance in the Season 9 episode "Last Known Surroundings".

== Cast and characters ==
=== Main ===
- Chad Michael Murray as Lucas Scott
- James Lafferty as Nathan Scott
- Hilarie Burton as Peyton Sawyer Scott
- Bethany Joy Galeotti as Haley James Scott
- Sophia Bush as Brooke Davis
- Paul Johansson as Dan Scott
- Barbara Alyn Woods as Deb Lee
- Antwon Tanner as Skills Taylor
- Lee Norris as Mouth McFadden
- Jackson Brundage as Jamie Scott
- Lisa Goldstein as Millicent Huxtable

=== Recurring ===
- Ashley Rickards as Sam Walker
- Austin Nichols as Julian Baker
- Kate Voegele as Mia Catalano
- Stephen Colletti as Chase Adams
- Burgess Jenkins as Bobby Irons
- Daphne Zuniga as Victoria Davis
- Joe Manganiello as Owen Morello
- Vaughn Wilson as Fergie Thompson
- Cullen Moss as Junk Moretti
- Evan Peters as Jack Daniels
- Kelsey Chow as Gigi Silveri
- Allison Munn as Lauren
- Robbie Jones as Quentin Fields
- Torrey DeVitto as Carrie
- James Van Der Beek as Adam Reese
- John Doe as Mick Wolf
- Ernest Waddell as Derek Sommers
- Michaela McManus as Lindsey Strauss
- Gregory Harrison as Paul Norris
- Bradley Evans as Jerry
- Jaden Harmon as Andre Fields
- Michael May as Chuck Scolnik
- Kelley Davis as Chuck's mom
- Katherine Landry as Madison
- Devin McGee as Xavier Daniels

=== Special guest stars ===
- Barry Corbin as Whitey Durham
- Moira Kelly as Karen Roe
- Grace Potter as herself
- Angels & Airwaves as themselves
- Nick Lachey as himself

== Episodes ==
No. overall	No. in season	Title	Directed by	Written by	Original release date	Prod. code	U.S. viewers (millions)
107	1	"Touch Me I'm Going to Scream, Part 1"	Stuart Gillard	Mark Schwahn	September 1, 2008	3T7551	3.24
The season starts right where it left off the previous one: Peyton is revealed to be the woman Lucas called. Upon her arrival to the airport, Lucas proposes to Peyton and the two fly to Vegas to elope; they quickly realize it isn't romantic enough, leading them to change their plans. Victoria returns to Tree Hill in an attempt to steal Brooke's company. Mouth prepares to say goodbye to his friends, Tree Hill and Millicent, who plans to stay behind to help Brooke fight for her company against Victoria. Dan survives being run over, but quickly realizes Carrie has taken him hostage to seek revenge on him for foiling her plans to kidnap Jamie. Dan tries to escape but realizes he's in the middle of nowhere, and Carrie eventually reveals to him that he's going to help her get Jamie back. Peyton brings Lucas back to the hotel room where he first proposed to her in L.A., where they have a romantic moment living out Peyton's earlier mentioned dream and finally become officially engaged. Brooke tells Millie she's fired and to go and be with Mouth, later, while closing up the store alone, Brooke is violently attacked by a masked man. This episode is named after a song by My Morning Jacket.
108	2	"One Million Billionth of a Millisecond on a Sunday Morning"	Greg Prange	Mark Schwahn	September 8, 2008	3T7552	3.28
Jamie catches Skills and Deb kissing in the kitchen and later asks Deb if she loves him. Peyton reveals her engagement to Brooke, who is badly bruised and traumatized from her attack. Brooke turns to Deb for help but lies to Peyton about how her injuries happened. Coming back to Tree Hill, Lucas tells Haley he's finally engaged to Peyton and that he knows this is the right decision: Haley happily supports him. Then, he and Peyton move in together in his house. Haley discovers pain meds missing and accuses Deb of relapsing, but it's quickly revealed that Nathan has been taking them for his recent back pain. Haley is concerned about Nathan's back and requests scheduling a doctor appointment to make sure everything's fine. Carrie makes an elaborate plan to kidnap Jamie while framing Dan, but he taunts her, saying her plan is a total failure. Dan finds out from Carrie that his pager went off after he was hit by the car, signaling his heart was ready. He reveals this to her and she spirals as she realizes her plan is falling apart. Quentin tells Nate he's excited to be around for his comeback, but Nate insists it's not a comeback while thanking him. Jamie asks Haley to make Quentin a cape after Quentin gives him a place to keep his treasures. Brooke is taking shooting lessons from Deb, meanwhile Quentin visits a gas station, entering into a fatal situation. Lucas gets a call in the middle of the night that Quentin has died. This episode is named after a song by The Flaming Lips.
109	3	"Get Cape. Wear Cape. Fly."	Liz Friedlander	Mark Schwahn	September 15, 2008	3T7553	3.37
Everyone in Tree Hill reels over Quentin's unexpected murder. Haley and Nathan must find the words to help Jamie understand what happened to his friend Q, but he refuses to believe Q is gone for good. Brooke continues to struggle and hide the truth of her attack, which strains all of her friendships. Carrie modifies her plan to make it look like Dan killed someone in order to kidnap Jamie. While going through Q's things in the locker room, Jamie asks if he can keep Q's old jersey. Peyton, Lucas and Skills meet Q's grief-stricken family where Jamie bonds with Q's brother, Andre, gifting him Q's jersey. Dan stumbles upon the grave of Carrie's son while unsuccessfully trying escape from Carrie's house. Haley has her class write down how they feel about Q's death in an attempt to help the students heal. Haley also signs Q's desk with a quote from "Les Mis", the first book she had him read for extra credit, and encourages the other students to write kind words on his desk to process their grief. Jamie tells Haley he wants to go to Q's funeral to say goodbye; he later lays Q's finished cape on his coffin. Deb comforts Skills during the funeral, exposing their relationship to everyone, including Nathan. Haley tears up reading the new girl, Sam's thoughts on Q's passing and what it says about who he was as a person. This episode is named after Sam Duckworth and his band, Get Cape. Wear Cape. Fly.
110	4	"Bridge Over Troubled Water"	Paul Johansson	Terrence Coli	September 22, 2008	3T7554	3.14
Everyone is still struggling with Quentin's murder; Jamie and Haley visit Q's grave where they see Dan's preemptive headstone causing Jamie to ask about seeing him. Nathan struggles to come to terms with Deb's relationship with Skills, kicking her out. Peyton is surprised when a famous musician, Mick, visits her studio. Brooke seeks help from a therapist and reveals she believes her mother hired someone to attack her before disclosing their difficult history. Deb ends her relationship with Skills to keep Jamie in her life while Peyton finds out Mick knew her mom, Ellie, and asks if he knew her dad, which he denies. Haley intervenes during a school fight involving Sam, the girl who shoplifted from Brooke's store but Sam only mocks her for helping. Lucas continues to see Q's family while struggling to inspire the Ravens. Q's jersey is retired and put on the wall next to Nathan's during a game honoring him. Carrie breaks into the house to steal some of Jamie's things in advance of her plan to kidnap him and Brooke decides to confront Victoria directly, accusing her being behind the attack. Victoria expresses her concern, saying she'd never physically harm her before telling her she never wanted any kids, but Brooke's father wanted a son. Brooke leaves, thanking her and giving her the company but telling her she lost her daughter. Nathan asks Deb to move back in and gives his blessing for her to be with Skills while Haley finds out Dan never answered the call for his new heart, wondering about his disappearance. The episode is named after the song by Simon & Garfunkel from the album of the same name.
111	5	"You've Dug Your Own Grave, Now Lie in It"	John Asher	William H. Brown	September 29, 2008	3T7555	3.42
Peyton and Lucas set a wedding date as she asks Brooke to make her dress. Brooke is still processing her attack and her confrontation with Victoria. Nathan gets a call from a D-League team, looking to meet with him. After talking to Mick about her dad and Ellie, Peyton believes Mick is her father. Lucas goes to New York and sees Lindsey to plan his book tour. Brooke continues to see a therapist while Nathan is asked to coach instead of play. Haley is told Dan is dying in hospice and wants to say goodbye to Jamie, leaving her conflicted about bringing Jamie to see him. Peyton and Mick make plans to discuss her parents more. While discussing his book tour, Lucas reveals to Lindsey he can't make a certain date because he's marrying Peyton then. A tearful Lindsey says she was right about Peyton and that she's upset he didn't tell her earlier. Peyton waits for Mick to show up while Lucas meets up with Lindsey in the bar they met to say goodbye; she reminds him she was originally rooting for him and Peyton. Haley falls for Carrie's plan and is knocked out while Jamie tries to lose Carrie in a corn field. Eventually, when Haley finds him and hides, Nathan calls her and Carrie chases them. Deb knocks Carrie out before she can get Haley and Jamie. Carrie comes to and attempts to hurt Deb and Haley as Dan shoots her. Sam and Brooke begin bonding, Mick drinks in a bar as he stares at a sobriety chip, and a dejected Peyton realizes he's not coming. This episode is named after a song by Kenotia.
112	6	"Choosing My Own Way of Life"	Clark Mathis	John A. Norris	October 13, 2008	3T7556	3.48
Millicent returns to Tree Hill, surprising Brooke with a list of things she always said she wanted to do that Victoria thought was stupid. Nathan and Haley find Sam sleeping in a car, leading Haley to ask about her foster parents. Later, Nathan continues basketball training with Skills. Peyton finds Mick passed out in her office, leading to an angry confrontation where he reveals he IS her father and how he would have been a terrible father to her. Lucas is surprised to see someone other than Lindsey taking over the book tour. When Dan visits Tree Hill High, Nathan thanks him for saving Jamie and Haley but also reminds him they're standing in the same spot where he killed Keith. Mouth is one of the only people to show for Lucas' tour stop in Omaha, leading to the tour's cancellation. Haley asks Brooke if she'd consider fostering Sam, but Brooke doesn't think she can. Nathan gets an unconventional opportunity to play basketball again. Brooke finally tells Peyton about her attack and opens up about how she's been feeling. Later, Brooke offers Sam the extra room in her house. Before leaving for tour, Mick gives Peyton the sobriety chip and says it was Ellie's chip from when she was pregnant with her. He says it's the most meaningful thing he owns and apologizes for leaving, but Peyton gives him genuine thanks for giving her up, realizing he gave her the life she has now. Mouth gives up his dream job for home and his dream girl, driving home to Tree Hill with Lucas. This episode is named after a song by Suicidal Tendencies.
113	7	"Messin' with the Kid"	Greg Prange	Mike Herro & David Strauss	October 20, 2008	3T7557	3.69
Sam and Brooke struggle to live together as Mouth finally returns home to Millie. Nathan gives SlamBall a try while encouraging Haley to return to her music. A magazine article leads Peyton and Lucas to get paranoid after moving in together, realizing that they do not know each other as well as they think they did. Jamie gets bullied at school for wearing his cape, leading him to fight. Meanwhile, Lucas & Peyton lock themselves in their house together, obsessing over the magazine and engaging in a hilarious competition as Brooke vents to Haley about Sam stealing things from her and sneaking around. Nathan and Haley ask Jamie about getting into a fight at school and tell him to ignore the kid picking on his cape. Haley later confronts the mother of the boy picking on Jamie, but gets into a fight while Nathan teases her about how she handled things contrary to her advice to Jamie. Mouth gets his old job back, with better benefits and a blast from his past - Gigi, his high school ex-girlfriend. Nathan shows up to Jamie's school wearing his own cape, saying it helps him make slam dunks. He brings capes and all the other children race for them. Sam has a very vulnerable moment with Brooke, leading Brooke to question her decision to stop helping her. Later, Nathan tells Jamie he is proud of him, and that Quentin would be too; Brooke asks Sam to move in with her but imposes rules; Owen tries to get in Brooke's good graces, but he is rejected; and Lucas and Peyton call a truce. Dan intimidates the mom whose kid has been bullying Jamie while Haley meets up with a fan to get back into music. This episode is named after the song by Junior Wells.
114	8	"Our Life Is Not a Movie or Maybe"	Peter B. Kowalski	Mark Schwahn	October 27, 2008	3T7558	3.21
Brooke, Haley, Peyton, Lucas, Millie, Jamie & Sam all watch Nathan partake in a violent game of SlamBall. Millie starts to get jealous about Gigi working with Mouth while Lucas is offered to turn his first book into a movie by an LA producer named Julian Baker. Peyton reunites with her brother Derek and Mouth confronts Gigi about her behavior towards him, attempting to set some boundaries. Everyone jokingly talks to Lucas about who should play them in his movie. Peyton and Derek bond over their issues with their father while Lucas asks Brooke if she's ok with his book being made into a movie, to which she encourages to move ahead and make the movie. Jamie bonds with Sam when he sleeps over at Brooke's house after Nathan brings Owen by to talk with Brooke. Peyton offers to host a USO show at TRIC for Derek. Later, Lucas meets with Julian to further discuss turning his book into a movie, where he expresses his hesitancy. Julian tells Lucas he wants him to write the screenplay to keep it true to the novel, revealing Lucas would make a lot of money too. Julian then asks him about Peyton, prompting Lucas to reveal they're engaged. Brooke finds out Sam ran away with Jamie and broke into her store to throw a party where Peyton's wedding dress gets completely trashed. Jamie stands up for Sam to an angry Brooke, who grounds Sam. Lucas finally agrees to sign the contract with Julian, inviting Peyton to come and celebrate with them. A horrified Peyton is surprised to learn a ghost from her past, Julian, is the one who has optioned Lucas' book. This episode is named after a song by Okkervil River.
115	9	"Sympathy for the Devil"	Bradley Walsh	Michael Daniels	November 3, 2008	3T7559	3.02
Owen continues to try to get Brooke to forgive him. Peyton remembers meeting Julian in LA right after her and Lucas broke up. She doesn't reveal her past to Lucas. Three weeks later, Lucas struggles to write Keith's murder scene, but Julian says he needs to write it or someone else will. Peyton tells Brooke she still hasn't told Lucas about her past with Julian because she doesn't want it to ruin things for Lucas. Peyton remembers seeing Lindsey kiss Lucas at his book signing before running into Julian, who makes her laugh and takes her on a date. Nathan prepares to face a former, bitter rival. Peyton remembers when Julian moved in with her, both saying "I love you". Lucas tells Peyton he doesn't want to make up Keith's final moments for cinematic purposes, but Peyton convinces him that Keith would rather Lucas be the person to write about it. Peyton remembers Julian discovering a copy of Lucas' book, accusing her of not being over him and breaking up with her. Owen tells Brooke she humiliated him and that he will leave her alone, Peyton confronts Julian about his intentions, and Haley confronts Jamie about extorting his friends. Lucas asks Dan about shooting Keith, so Dan tells him the truth about what happened. Nathan quits SlamBall after being targeted by an opponent. Julian looks at a picture of him and Peyton that he keeps in his copy of Lucas' book and Brooke apologizes to Owen but says she needs to put Sam first. Lucas finds the picture of Julian and Peyton when he goes to give Julian a draft of Keith's murder scene while Gigi propositions Mouth. Before Peyton can tell Lucas about Julian, he reveals the picture he found, so she tells him Julian and she were in love. This episode is named after a song by The Rolling Stones.
116	10	"Even Fairy Tale Characters Would Be Jealous"	Janice Cooke	Nikki Schiefelbein	November 10, 2008	3T7560	2.99
Brooke is surprised by Sam's recent nice behavior. Millie finds Gigi asleep in her bed with Mouth on the couch. Nathan encourages Haley to pursue her dreams and perform again while Brooke gets a call from the adoption agency, leading Sam to worry. Lucas punches Julian for not telling him about his past with Peyton and Nathan starts hallucinating conversations with Quentin. Sam works for Peyton at the USO concert for armed forces, expressing her fears about Brooke adopting a new child as Nathan imagines Q giving him grief about his failed comeback. Mia comes back to perform at the concert. Brooke is excited to see Sam so happy when Lucas asks Brooke about Julian, she says he was just a rebound. Gigi continues to hit on Mouth, ignoring his protests and Nate learns Q's death caused him to realize he's not invincible. Julian tells Lucas he owns the option to the book, so the movie can happen with or without Lucas. Angels and Airwaves performs at the USO concert and Millie tells Gigi to stay away from Mouth. Brooke assures Sam she will always have a home with her as long as she wants to while Peyton feels guilty about Lucas not doing the movie because of her past with Julian. Millie sees Mouth with Gigi again and assumes the worst. Julian asks Peyton to get Lucas onboard with the movie because he believes in it and Nathan surprises Haley with a romantic gesture and she sings for him at home. Brooke tells the adoption agency she's interested, but they're concerned about her fostering a teenager at the same time while Peyton encourages Lucas to continue with the movie adaption. This episode is named after a song by PlayRadioPlay!
117	11	"We Three (My Echo, My Shadow and Me)"	Joe Davola	Chad Michael Murray	November 17, 2008	3T7561	2.72
Lucas talks on the phone with Peyton in present time before falling asleep. He has a film noir dream about a club he owns in the 1940s. Haley is a singer at Lucas' club and Dan is a mobster, claiming she owes him everything. Nathan is a bartender who thinks he is a "nobody", Mouth is a journalist, Skills is a piano player, Brooke is desperate for money, and Peyton is being taken care of by Dan. Dan comes to Lucas' club, threatening Brooke about her debts and mocking Lucas about stealing Haley from him. He further threatens to kill him before Owen, a police officer, escorts him out. Dan and his driver Julian drop Peyton at home, where he tells her to avoid Lucas. Dan again threatens Brooke as Mouth overhears, discovering Dan's true intentions. Peyton sneaks away to visit with Lucas, saying her car "broke down" and convinces him to walk her home. Nathan tells Haley he is being deployed, so they choose to elope. Peyton and Lucas end their walk with a kiss, which Brooke sees; she then tells Dan to erase her debts as Julian breaks Skills' hand to send Lucas a message. While trying to uncover the full truth, Mouth is murdered by Dan. Lucas and Dan face off ending in both Peyton and Julian's deaths. Lucas wakes up to a call from Peyton, realizing it was all a dream. In her office, Peyton collapses in pain. This episode is named after a song by The Ink Spots.
118	12	"You Have to Be Joking (Autopsy of the Devil's Brain)"	Mark Schwahn	Mark Schwahn	November 24, 2008	3T7562	2.65
Nathan continues to pursue his dreams and gets a pro basketball try-out. Brooke finds Sam sneaking a guy out of the house while Lucas tells Julian he will continue with the movie. Peyton struggles with health concerns and later, with helping Mia focus on her follow-up album. A dubious Brooke is approached by Julian about designing clothes for his movie, later she opens up to Sam about her attack. Haley prepares a reluctant Jamie for his school talent show, Nathan successfully changes his position to point guard in honor of Quentin's advice, and Lucas clashes with Julian's recommended movie director (guest star James Van Der Beek) over changing the script. Brooke rejects Julian's earlier request while Mia refuses to sing songs written by other people, leading Peyton to suggest her to move to a different label. At that time, Peyton is researching cancer online and she may have it due to it running in the family. Jamie plays the piano for the talent show but also tells jokes, like he initially wanted. Sam's friend reveals he helped orchestrate the attack on Brooke after she caught Sam stealing, prompting Sam to tell a stunned Brooke what happened before running away. Brooke hysterically tries to get Owen to help find Sam but he's less than worried. Gigi continues pursuing Mouth, leading Millie to confront him before going to the bar to ease her pain with a drunk Owen. Brooke finds out Julian was helping look for Sam, who is revealed to be in a dangerous situation with the same man who killed Quentin. This episode is named after a song by The Flaming Lips.
119	13	"Things a Mama Don't Know"	Michael J. Leone	Karin Gist	January 5, 2009	3T7563	2.66
Peyton shares some surprising news with Lucas as Nathan shares exciting news with Haley and Jamie. Meanwhile, Millie cries hysterically in Brooke's store while Brooke frantically searches for Sam, who is with her friend Jack and his brother, the man who killed Quentin. Sam is creeped out by Jack's brother as he tells her he knows she went through his stuff. He interrogates her before striking Jack and locking them both in a room. Mia and Peyton reconcile before she helps Brooke look for Sam. Nathan has a rough start to his new pro career as Jamie plans to take Andre to see Q's grave, thinking Andre's mom said it was ok. Lucas meets with Paul Norris, Julian's father, who blames Julian for Lucas' issues with the movie director. Jack escapes as his brother holds Sam hostage while Julian agrees to help find Sam. Haley is recruited to first help Mia with music and then later to help find Sam. Meanwhile, a tearful Millie tells Mouth she drunkenly lost her virginity to someone else the night before. Brooke goes to Jack's house alone to find Sam as Chase returns to find Owen has reverted to his old ways (guest star Stephen Colletti), promising to take over Owen's bartending gig. Julian's dad tells Lucas he wants to replace Julian but Lucas says he believes in him. As Brooke is leaving Jack's house, she realizes his brother is the one who attacked her and then fights to protect Sam before holding a gun to his head. Sam pleads with Brooke not to kill him because she needs her, just as Julian and Jack arrive to help. Q's mom finds Jamie and Andre, promising to visit Q's grave more. The police arrest Jack's brother and figure out he also killed Q while Lucas comes home to a pregnant Peyton. This episode is named after a song by Mica Roberts.
120	14	"A Hand to Take Hold of the Scene"	Chad Michael Murray	Mike Daniels	January 12, 2009	3T7564	3.06
News of Peyton's pregnancy spreads quickly through Tree Hill. Brooke has to deal with Julian's intentions and in the meantime, Lucas and Peyton babysit Jamie and Andre. Haley and Nathan double up with Mia and Chase on their date. Millie attempts to reconcile her relationship with Mouth to no avail. This episode is named after a song by Okkervil River.
121	15	"We Change, We Wait"	Les Butler	John Norris	January 19, 2009	3T7565	2.60
Problems arise when Lucas and Julian try to find a new director. Peyton is puzzled by a present from Lucas and Brooke battles with some complications in her love life. This episode is named after a song by The Maine.
122	16	"Screenwriter's Blues"	Bethany Joy Lenz	Mike Herro & David Strauss	February 2, 2009	3T7566	2.65
Tree Hill is in an uproar again when Lucas has problems with the casting for the movie and Peyton tries to solve the wedding plans. Brooke meets the actress who will play her in the movie. Nathan gets good news and Haley must make a tough decision by herself. Dan advises Jamie on how to deal with a school crush. This episode is named after a song by Soul Coughing.
123	17	"You and Me and the Bottle Makes Three Tonight"	Greg Prange	Terrence Coli	March 16, 2009	3T7567	2.41
Peyton and Lucas receive some startling news about their baby's condition. Brooke and Julian come to a crossroads within their relationship. It's Nathan and Haley's wedding anniversary, and as they celebrate, Dan and Deb are left to babysit Jamie. Elsewhere Mouth and Millie try to pick up the pieces of their relationship. This episode is named after a song by Big Bad Voodoo Daddy.
124	18	"Searching for a Former Clarity"	Joe Davola	Mark Schwahn	March 23, 2009	3T7568	2.40
Lucas and Julian hit a setback with the production of the film. Peyton and Haley help Mia with her new single. Brooke must intervene when Sam is arrested. Jamie discovers the truth about Dan and Uncle Keith. The episode closes with one of the most famous scenes in the series: at the hospital, a golden retriever devours the heart intended to be used for Dan's transplant. This episode is named after a song by Against Me!
125	19	"Letting Go"	Paul Johansson	David Handelman	March 30, 2009	3T7569	2.36
Julian asks Brooke to move to LA with him. Lucas brings Nathan and Jamie to an important place from his past, while Peyton prepares for the future. Sam and Jack take a stand against the principal who fired Haley. Skills takes Mouth on a road trip to get his mind off Millie. Towards the end of this episode Brooke shows up at the airport and turns down Julian's offer to go to LA. This episode is named after a song by Paul McCartney and Wings.
126	20	"I Would for You"	Peter B. Kowalski	Chris "CARM" Armstrong & Bryan Gracia	April 20, 2009	3T7570	2.45
When Peyton's pregnancy is threatened, Lucas struggles to pick up the pieces. Victoria returns to lure Brooke back to Clothes Over Bros. Haley and Nathan clash over the decision to pull Jamie from his school. Mouth tries to mend fences with Millicent. Sam's friend Jack leaves to a foster home, which leads Victoria to comfort her. This episode is named after a song by Jane's Addiction.
127	21	"A Kiss to Build a Dream On"	Erica Dunton	Karin Gist	April 27, 2009	3T7571	2.28
Brooke discovers something that could change Sam's life. Nathan questions his dreams of playing in the NBA while Haley receives an unexpected offer from Nick Lachey. Jamie and Skills mend their broken hearts at Jamie's first school dance. Meanwhile, Lucas and Peyton have a road trip to remember. This episode is named after a song by Louis Armstrong.
128	22	"Show Me How to Live"	James Lafferty	William H. Brown	May 4, 2009	3T7572	2.23
Brooke and Haley throw Peyton a baby shower, while Sam grows closer to Victoria. Lucas and Jamie bond while working on Peyton’s car, and Nathan learns that NBA scouts will be at his next game. Meanwhile, Skills and Lauren go on a date that goes all wrong. Sam leaves Brooke's house to go live with her birth mother. This episode is named after a song by Audioslave.
129	23	"Forever and Almost Always"	Greg Prange	Mark Schwahn	May 11, 2009	3T7573	2.30
Peyton and Lucas' wedding day has finally arrived and surprise guests attend. Haley plays an unexpected role in the ceremony while Nathan hopes to be called up to the NBA. Skills keeps Jamie on a short leash, and Brooke does the same with Nick Lachey as she tries to make Julian jealous after he shows up with a date. After returning home from their wedding reception, Lucas wants to surprise Peyton with the Comet but he finds her passed out on the floor, bleeding. This episode is named after a song by Kate Voegele.
130	24	"Remember Me as a Time of Day"	Mark Schwahn	Mark Schwahn	May 18, 2009	3T7574	2.68
Peyton is rushed to surgery after losing blood and fainting. On the eve of Peyton's delivery, Peyton and Lucas receive a surprise visit from a friend of theirs, and they welcome a daughter, Sawyer Brooke Scott. Victoria finally understands Brooke's pain, and gives her the company back. They make amends and Victoria urges Brooke to do one special thing. Nathan is released from the Chiefs but gets surprising news he's made it to the NBA, and is signed by the Charlotte Bobcats. Facing death, Dan visits someone from the past, and apologizes for everything that happened. Dan wants him to take his life, but he offers redemption to Dan. Lucas, Peyton and Sawyer pack up their stuff, and ride away in to the sunset with the newly repaired Comet, leaving Tree Hill for good as this season finale closes. This episode is named after a song by Explosions in the Sky.

== Production ==
The CW announced on March 3, 2008, that One Tree Hill was renewed for a sixth season. It was later reported the season would consist of twenty-four episodes, making it the biggest episode order in the series.

== Reception ==
Episode 7 hit series highs in Adults 18–34 with a 2.7 rating, it also hit its second best numbers in The CW's target audience of Women 18–34 with a 4.0 rating.

The overall season averaged 2.81 million viewers and ranked #110 with 1.42 rating.

== DVD release ==
The DVD release of season six was released after the season has completed broadcast on television. It has been released in Region 1. As well as every episode from the season, the DVD release features bonus material such as audio commentaries on some episodes from the creator and cast, deleted scenes, gag reels and behind-the-scenes featurettes.

The Complete Sixth Season
Set details			Special features
24 episodes; 1102 minutes (Region 1); 1058 minutes (Region 2); 850 minutes (Region 4); 7-disc set; 1.78:1 aspect ratio; Languages: English (Dolby Digital 5.1); Subtitles: English, Spanish French (Region 1)			Audio commentaries; "You Have to Be Joking (Autopsy of the Devil's Brain)" - with creator/executive producer/writer Mark Schwahn, and actor(s) James Lafferty, Jackson Brundage, Kate Voegele and Stephen Colletti.; "Searching for a Former Clarity" - with creator/executive producer/co-writer Mark Schwahn and executive producers Joe Davola, and actor(s) Sophia Bush, Daphne Zuniga and Kate Voegele.; Deleted scenes; Episodes: 3, 4, 5, 6, 7, 9, 13, 15, 20; Gag reel; "One Tree Hill Goes Back in Time"; "Slammin' with OTH"; "OTH Celebrity Soundtrack"; "OTH – The Director's Debut"
Release dates
United States	United Kingdom	Australia	
August 25, 2009	October 5, 2009	February 3, 2010	
