= One Tree Hill season 8 =

One Tree Hill
- Season 8
- One Tree Hill Season 8 DVD cover
- No. of episodes: 22

Release
- Original network: The CW
- Original release: September 14, 2010 – May 17, 2011

Season chronology
- ← Previous; Season 7 Next → Season 9

The eighth season of One Tree Hill, an American television series, premiered on September 14, 2010. After successful ratings for the early episodes of the season on The CW, the network ordered a back-order of nine episodes, bringing the total episode count to twenty-two.

Season eight features the return of the original opening credits and the original opening theme song "I Don't Want to Be" covered by various artists each week, while the original version is featured sporadically. Schwahn wrote 13 out of the 22 episodes, including the final six episodes of the season.

The season opened to a 1.1 Adults 18–49 rating and 2.14 million viewers. The thirteenth episode of the season, "The Other Half of Me" which saw Brooke getting married achieved season highs in all categories with a 1.2 Adults 18–49 rating, a 2.4 in Women 18–34 and 2.42 million viewers making it the most watched episode since December 2009. The overall season continued the show’s falling down in ratings, averaging 1.78 million viewers with 0.8 rating and ranking #129.

== Cast and characters ==
=== Main ===
- James Lafferty as Nathan Scott
- Bethany Joy Galeotti as Haley James Scott
- Sophia Bush as Brooke Davis
- Austin Nichols as Julian Baker
- Robert Buckley as Clay Evans
- Shantel VanSanten as Quinn James
- Jackson Brundage as Jamie Scott
- Lee Norris as Mouth McFadden
- Jana Kramer as Alex Dupre
- Lisa Goldstein as Millicent Huxtable
- Stephen Colletti as Chase Adams

=== Recurring ===
- Kate Voegele as Mia Catalano
- Daphne Zuniga as Victoria Davis
- Antwon Tanner as Skills Taylor
- Laura Izibor as Erin Macree
- Peter Riegert as Dr. August Kellerman
- Sharon Lawrence as Sylvia Baker
- Leven Rambin as Chloe Hall
- Allison Munn as Lauren
- Amanda Schull as Katie Ryan
- Cullen Moss as Junk Moretti
- Gregory Harrison as Paul Norris
- Vaughn Wilson as Fergie Thompson
- Eric McIntire as Ian Kellerman
- Michael May as Chuck Scolnik
- Katherine Landry as Madison
- Kelley Davis as Mrs. Scolnik
- Bradley Evans as Jerry

=== Special guest star ===
- Paul Johansson as Dan Scott
- Kid Cudi as himself
- Dave Navarro as himself

== Episodes ==
No. overall	No. in season	Title	Directed by	Written by	Original release date	Prod. code	U.S. viewers (millions)
153	1	"Asleep at Heaven's Gate"	Mark Schwahn	Mark Schwahn	September 14, 2010	3X6351	2.14
After being shot and left for dead by Katie Ryan, both Clay and Quinn fight for their lives while they have an out of body experience of being at the beach. Meanwhile, Haley and Nathan prepare to tell Jamie about the pregnancy. Brooke is arrested after it's discovered that Victoria and Millicent falsified profits and lied to investors to fund the men's line "Clothes 4 Bros". Also, Chase and Alex work together at the bar. This episode is named after an album by Rogue Wave. Opening theme song performed by Gavin DeGraw.
154	2	"I Can't See You, But I Know You're There"	Joe Davola	Mark Schwahn	September 21, 2010	3X6352	1.86
Alex becomes a success as a bartender, Mia opens up to Chase. Julian and Jamie bond while Clay and Quinn lie in a coma in the hospital. Haley struggles with what has happened while Nathan decides to stay in Tree Hill a little bit longer to help her through the tragedy. Meanwhile, Brooke deals with publicity and finding a way to keep her from going to jail for Victoria's actions. This episode is named after a song by Laura Jane Grace. Opening theme song performed by Kate Voegele.
155	3	"The Space in Between"	Greg Prange	Mark Schwahn	September 28, 2010	3X6353	1.83
Clay lives due to a successful kidney transplant from Will (guest star Edwin Hodge), a man in a similar position in the in-between. Meanwhile, Brooke deals with the press and the unfortunate news that she might go to jail because of the actions of Victoria and Millicent. This episode title is inspired by the Dave Matthews Band's song "The Space Between". Opening theme song performed by Patrick Stump of Fall Out Boy.
156	4	"We All Fall Down"	Peter B. Kowalski	William H. Brown	October 5, 2010	3X6354	1.97
Brooke and Nathan make big decisions regarding their careers. Brooke sells her entire company to pay back investors while Nathan decides to stay in Tree Hill for good because of his back problems. Meanwhile, Quinn deals with recovering from the shooting while wanting to be by Clay's side. This episode is named after a song by All Time Low. Opening theme song performed by Susie Suh.
157	5	"Nobody Taught Us to Quit"	James Lafferty	Mark Schwahn	October 12, 2010	3X6355	1.91
Victoria disowns Brooke after learning she is selling the company. Meanwhile, Clay leaves the hospital and returns to living at the beach house with Quinn. Nathan offers to help Clay with his business until he can get better and continue to help his clients. Julian begins a new movie project, a documentary inspired by Nathan and his career decisions. This episode is named after a song by The Henry Clay People. Opening theme song performed by Matthew Ryan.
158	6	"Not Afraid"	Sophia Bush	John A. Norris	October 19, 2010	3X6356	1.90
It's Halloween in Tree Hill, and Julian's mother, Sylvia, arrives in town to help plan Brooke and Julian's wedding. She later tries to take over. Quinn deals with living in the beach house still in fear of Katie who is still on the loose. With trick-or-treaters coming to their doorstep, Clay has special rules for the candy. Chase takes out his frustrations on Mia. Mouth sets some boundaries with his relationship with Millie. Meanwhile, Haley continues to provide help for an Irish woman on the hotline she works for. Haley later recognizes the woman's voice as Erin, a singer who enters an open mic night at TRIC. This episode is named after a song by Eminem. Opening theme song performed by Laura Izibor.
159	7	"Luck Be a Lady"	Les Butler	Mike Herro & David Strauss	November 2, 2010	3X6357	1.82
As the wedding approaches, Brooke tries to connect with Sylvia, while Julian looks for his best man at a guys' poker night. Meanwhile, Nathan struggles in his new job, while Haley stumbles on finding Erin, and Skills returns to town with a new friend as Lucas' Mannequin. This episode is named after a song by Frank Sinatra. Opening theme song performed by Lucas Field.
160	8	"Mouthful of Diamonds"	Michael J. Leone	Mark Schwahn	November 9, 2010	3X6358	1.70
Nathan's career as an agent takes a big step forward when he visits Atlanta, while Haley consoles Jamie regarding his new braces. The drama between Brooke and Sylvia finally comes to a head, and Chase makes a decision regarding Mia and Alex. This episode is named after a song by Phantogram. Opening theme song performed by Grace Potter.
161	9	"Between Raising Hell and Amazing Grace"	Bethany Joy Lenz	Nikki Schiefelbein	November 16, 2010	3X6359	1.90
It's Thanksgiving in Tree Hill. Brooke decides it's time to try her hand at a home-cooked Thanksgiving dinner but things don't really go as planned. All of the gang end up at Haley's for dinner where Mia and Alex have a cat fight over Chase. This episode is named after a song by Big & Rich. Opening theme song performed by Wakey!Wakey!
162	10	"Lists, Plans"	Joe Davola	Johnny Richardson	November 30, 2010	3X6360	1.81
Julian tries to get Brooke to complete a list of dreams that Millicent made for her back when she had her company, including skydiving and a James Bond marathon. Haley sets up a concert at TRIC featuring musical guest star, Kid Cudi, whom Erin is the opening act for, while Mia & Alex do friendly "celebrity bar-tending" competition to see who has more fans in Tree Hill. Nathan takes a business class at a university to complete his left out credits to become a full-time agent with Clay. Jamie helps his father by tutoring him and helping him remember parts of the book he's studying. Meanwhile, Quinn sneaks out of town to visit Dan to get his help in finding and killing Katie, but decides against it while driving back home and throws the gun in the river. Elsewhere, Katie makes her way back to Tree Hill after learning that Quinn and Clay are still alive. This episode is named after a song by the band A Sunny Day in Glasgow. Opening theme song performed by Aimee Mann.
163	11	"Darkness on the Edge of Town"	Mark Schwahn	Mark Schwahn	December 7, 2010	3X6361	2.20
A major hurricane hits Tree Hill and Katie comes back to finish what she started with Quinn and Clay, but she is eventually shot and stopped for good. Meanwhile, Brooke and Julian fight over moving to L.A. which angers Brooke and leaves, driving into the storm. As Brooke reaches the bridge she finds Lauren's car crashed on the bridge with Jamie, Chuck and Madison trapped inside. Brooke helps Chuck, Madison and Lauren and sends them to get help while Brooke rushes in to save Jamie who is stuck in the car. A passing vehicle knocks the car into the lake and Julian dives in after them. Julian manages to save Jamie and Brooke. This episode is named after a song by Bruce Springsteen. Opening theme song performed by Gavin DeGraw.
164	12	"The Drinks We Drank Last Night"	Chad Graves	Shaina Fewell	January 25, 2011	3X6362	1.90
After a wild night out on the town for her bachelorette party, Brooke and the girls try to piece together the night before amidst the wreckage of the day after. This episode is a tribute to The Hangover. This episode is named after a song by Azure Ray. Opening theme song performed by Tegan and Sara.
165	13	"The Other Half of Me"	Greg Prange	John A. Norris	February 1, 2011	3X6363	2.42
Brooke and Julian's wedding day has finally arrived. Alex and Quinn start to spend a lot more time together, as they continue to share their past experiences with almost dying. Haley tells Jamie that he's going to have a little sister. Millie grows closer to Mouth, due to the wedding. This episode is named after a song by Within Temptation. Opening theme song performed by Augustana.
166	14	"Holding Out for a Hero"	Peter B. Kowalski	Mike Herro & David Strauss	February 8, 2011	3X6364	1.60
Haley, Brooke, and Quinn become super-heroes for the day to use their talents for the greater good. Julian takes on a directing job and helps Mouth, Chase mentors Chuck and Alex reveals her unheard talent as a musician. This episode is a tribute to Kick-Ass. This episode is named after a song from Footloose, interpreted by Bonnie Tyler. Opening theme song performed by SO&SO.
167	15	"Valentine's Day Is Over"	Paul Johansson	Mark Schwahn	February 15, 2011	3X6365	1.65
Sex games, secrets and shoelaces all come into play as the couples of Tree Hill celebrate Valentine's Day. This episode is named after a song by Billy Bragg. Opening theme song performed by The New Amsterdams.
168	16	"I Think I'm Gonna Like It Here"	Steven Goldfried	Rachel Specter & Audrey Wauchope	February 22, 2011	3X6366	2.01
As the girls plan a surprise baby shower for Haley, the guys participate in try-outs for Jamie's baseball team. Meanwhile, Brooke and Julian pursue adoption... while Mouth gets Millicent ready for her first day of work. This episode is named after a song from the musical Annie. Opening theme song performed by Olin and the Moon.
169	17	"The Smoker You Drink, the Player You Get"	Les Butler	Mark Schwahn	March 1, 2011	3X6367	1.60
As Haley's due date approaches, she starts preparing her friends and family to make sure that they are ready when the baby arrives. Julian and Brooke prepare for their adoption, and Chuck looks to Chase to help him with a problem. This episode is named after an album by Joe Walsh. Opening theme song performed by Spinnerette.
170	18	"Quiet Little Voices"	Austin Nichols	Mark Schwahn	April 19, 2011	3X6368	1.41
The big day has finally arrived and the gang gathers at the hospital to await the birth of Haley and Nathan's baby. While they wait, they reminisce about the memories they have shared over the years. Haley gives birth to a baby girl called Lydia Bob Scott, Whereas Julian and Brooke don't get a baby as the girl decides she wants to keep the baby. This episode is named after a song by We Were Promised Jetpacks. Opening theme song performed by Laura Veirs.
171	19	"Where Not to Look for Freedom"	Joe Davola	Mark Schwahn	April 26, 2011	3X6369	1.45
Whilst Haley cares for their new daughter, Lydia, Nathan confronts Professor Kellerman (guest star Peter Riegert) about the accident. Meanwhile Quinn organizes a concert at Tric and Brooke gets an offer to return to Clothes Over Bro's as vice president. Skills and Mouth help Millie think of a story for her to cover and focus on the river court which is about to be destroyed. This episode is named after a song by The Belle Brigade. Opening theme song performed by Lucero.
172	20	"The Man Who Sailed Around His Soul"	Mark Schwahn	Mark Schwahn	May 3, 2011	3X6370	1.25
Nathan, Julian and Clay confront Ian Kellerman about the accident. Chase asks Alex to take a drug test for him, Quinn gets an offer to shoot in Puerto Rico and Brooke finds out she is pregnant. Nathan discusses with Haley about visiting Dan. This episode is named after a song by XTC. Opening theme song performed by Against Me!
173	21	"Flightless Bird, American Mouth"	Greg Prange	Mark Schwahn	May 10, 2011	3X6371	1.30
Nathan, Jamie, Clay, Julian, Chase and Chuck camp at the River Court. The Girls head to Puerto Rico and Haley turns Clothes over Bros back to Karen's Cafe. This episode is named after a song by Iron and Wine. Opening theme song performed by Joshua Radin.
174	22	"This Is My House, This Is My Home"	Mark Schwahn	Mark Schwahn	May 17, 2011	3X6372	1.48
Haley and Brooke prepare to re-open Karen's Café, and Nathan and Clay travel in search of new clients. Alex and Chuck are disappointed after Chase leaves for the Air Force, and Mouth and Millie start their new morning show together. Brooke gives birth to twin boys, Davis and Jude. Nathan also visits Dan. This episode is named after a song by We Were Promised Jetpacks. Opening theme song performed by Gavin DeGraw.

== Production ==
I could never say no given what this has been. Every year it's, 'Do we think it can get picked up again? Do we think it can go?' And every year… we pick it up. You never count Mark out. Every year he comes back, and he's made the show better.

— Dawn Ostroff on the possibility on continuing the series past season eight.

The series was officially renewed for en eighth season on May 20, 2010. It was also announced the show would move to Tuesdays at 8:00 p.m. Eastern/7:00 p.m. Central, as a lead-in to Life Unexpected. The season premiered on September 14, 2010. Entertainment Weekly first reported that there would be a crossover event with Life Unexpected. In the crossover, Haley and Mia traveled to Portland (where Life Unexpected is set) to sing in a music festival hosted by Cate's radio station. Haley and Cate met and were "surprised to learn that they share a similar back story [as] mothers." The CW was hoping that the crossover event would make One Tree Hill's viewers want to check out Life Unexpected. The episode aired October 12.

The original theme song of the show, "I Don't Want to Be" by Gavin DeGraw and original credit format will return for this season. Mark Schwahn has decided to introduce a new style of the theme song every week by selecting different artists to perform it such as Kate Voegele and members of Fall Out Boy. This will be the first season in 3 years to feature the opening credits.

On September 23, The CW ordered an additional 6 scripts for One Tree Hill, with its production order still at 13. On October 22, 2010, the show was picked up for a full-season, which will total at 22 episodes.

=== Cast ===
Everybody had the best intentions. But at the end of the day, it just didn't work out.

— Mark Schwahn on Murray and Burton not returning.

At the beginning of the season, Mark Schwahn said "there are a lot of people we'd like to bring back," specifically Paul Johansson and Danneel Harris. Sophia Bush also revealed that she would like to see Harris return. Sharon Lawrence signed on for a multi-episode arc to play Julian's mother who comes to Tree Hill to help plan Brooke and Julian's wedding. She has been described as a "monster-in-law". Laura Izibor also joined the cast as a musician in the same capacity as Kate Voegele. Kid Cudi will guest star in one episode for a concert Haley hosts at TRIC. Dave Navarro will also guest star as himself.

E! Online confirmed that there are plans for Chad Michael Murray and Hilarie Burton to return to the series in Season 8. Schwahn has said that the actors busy schedules may prevent a return in time for Brooke's wedding, but hopes they can return later in the season. On December 7, 2010, Kristin Dos Santos reported that Murray and Burton would definitely not be back for Brooke's wedding, but they are still expected to return. However, in a January 2011 interview, Hilarie Burton stated that she will not be returning to the show due to her busy schedule. Despite rumors to the contrary, Bethany Joy Galeotti has said she will be with the series until the end. Paul Johansson reprised his role as Dan Scott for one episode. Stephen Colletti was upgraded to series regular status from episode 14, after appearing in a recurring capacity since season four.

Movieline reported that The Blind Side actor Quinton Aaron would appear in the 14th episode of the season. He played Tommy, a student in Nathan's business class, whom he formed a bond with. Leven Rambin of Grey's Anatomy began a recurring role in episode 16. She played a young woman that Brooke crossed paths with as she explored adoption options. Mark Schwahn confirmed that Chad Michael Murray and Hilarie Burton would definitely not be in the final few episodes of season 8. He said on the matter, "Quite frankly, we just couldn't make a deal."

=== Story ===
I think that's what the fans want. They want to see Lucas and Peyton come back one more time and they want to see everybody together again. I think that's a healthy reward for the fans, after watching for so long. At this point, eight seasons in, what I want is to see the fans get what they want.

— James Lafferty on a possible Murray and Burton return.

Before season eight began, Mark Schwahn said there would be fewer crazy storylines and the show would return to its roots focusing on the core group of regulars and some guest stars, rather than the 30 or so from season 7. He was also hopeful for a Lucas and Peyton return for Brooke's wedding and the birth of Haley's baby. He has also mentioned the new love triangle he was developing, "Alex (Jana Kramer) has moved on to a new guy and a new triangle. She took a liking to Chase (Stephen Colletti) after he and Mia (Kate Voegele) broke up, but in the final episode, Mia made it clear via text that she regretted the decision to end it with him. This season, viewers will see who Chase really wants to be with. The Chase-Alex-Mia situation is front and center at the beginning of the season."

Brooke Davis is happier than ever; preparing to marry Julian Baker. Nathan prepares for his second season in the NBA; The Scott family are expecting their second child and Haley feels the baby will be a girl. Also, Quinn and Clay's lives hang in the balance. Robert Buckley has said Clay will be suffering from a chest wound. Both Clay and Quinn were later released and struggle with life back at the beach house. Entertainment Weekly reported that Victoria and Millicent will jeopardize the future of Brooke's company. They began lying to investors about Clothes Over Bro's finances to fund the men's line, causing Brooke to be arrested. She later made the decision to give up the company and her personal fortune in order to pay back investors in full, causing a new rift between her and Victoria as Victoria only went to prison so Brooke could keep her company.

Nathan abandoned basketball after finding out his back was getting worse. Quinn goes after Katie Ryan when she returns to Tree Hill from a photography trip to Africa, where she had detoured to track Katie down.

A major hurricane struck Tree Hill, leaving Brooke and Jamie's life in danger.

== Reception ==
The season opened to a 1.1 adults 18–49 rating and 2.14 million viewers. The thirteenth episode of the season, "The Other Half of Me" which saw Brooke get married achieved season highs in all categories with a 1.2 adults 18–49 rating, a 2.4 in women 18–34 and 2.42 million viewers making it the most watched episode since December, 2009. The twentieth episode of the season hit series lows in viewers (1.24 million) and in Adults 18–49 (0.6). The overall season continued the show’s falling down in ratings, averaging 1.78 million viewers with 0.8 rating and ranking #129. With live+7 day DVR viewing factored in, the season averaged 2.13 million viewers and 1.1 rating.

== DVD release ==
The DVD release of season eight was released nearly 5 months after the season had completed broadcast on television. It has been released in Region 1 and Region 2 and Region 4. As well as every episode from the season, the DVD release features bonus material such as audio commentaries on some episodes from the creator and cast, deleted scenes, gag reels and behind-the-scenes featurettes.

The Complete Eighth Season
Set details			Special features
22 episodes; 924 minutes (Region 1); 928 minutes (Region 2); 881 minutes (Region 4); 5-disc set (R1, R4), 6-disc set (R2); 1.78:1 aspect ratio; Languages: English (Dolby Digital 5.1); Subtitles: English, Spanish French (Region 1)			Audio commentaries; "I Can't See You, But i Know You're There" - with creator/executive producer/writer Mark Schwahn, and actor(s) Shantel VanSanten, Robert Buckley and Jackson Brundage; "Darkness on the Edge of Town" - with creator/executive producer/writer Mark Schwahn, and actor(s) Sophia Bush, Austin Nichols and Jackson Brundage; Deleted scenes; Episodes: 13, 14, 22; Gag reel; "Welcome to One Tree Hell": A Ghoulishly Fun Look at the Halloween Episode; "It Is a Big Deal": The Making of One Tree Hill's Midseason Finale; "Season GrEight!": Memories of the Eighth Season
Release dates
United States	United Kingdom	Australia	
December 20, 2011	November 7, 2011	February 1, 2012	
