= Kris Kringle =

Kris or Chris Kringle may refer to:

- Santa Claus, by assimilation in the United States of the separate German tradition of the Christkindl
  - Kris Kringle, the lead character in Miracle on 34th Street
  - Kris Kringle, the lead character in Santa Claus Is Comin' to Town (film)
  - Kris Kringle, the father of the lead character in the 2019 movie Noelle
  - Chris Kringle, the lead character in the 2020 movie Fatman
  - An Australian name for the gift giving tradition named Secret Santa
