= Carnifex (film) =

2022 independent Australian horror film

- Directed by: Sean Lahiff
- Written by: Shanti Gudgeon
- Produced by: Gena Helen Ashwell; Helen Leake
- Starring: Alexandra Park; Sisi Stringer; Harry Greenwood; Darren Gilshenan; Brendan Rock
- Cinematography: Kieran Fowler
- Edited by: Sean Lahiff
- Music by: Michael Darren
- Production company: Dancing Road Productions
- Distributed by: Universal Pictures (Australia); Arclight Films (International)
- Release date: 1 December 2022 (Australia)
- Running time: 93 minutes
- Country: Australia
- Language: English

Carnifex is a 2022 Australian horror film directed by Sean Lahiff and written by Shanti Gudgeon, starring Alexandra Park, Sisi Stringer, and Harry Greenwood. It premiered at the Sitges Film Festival in Spain on 6 October 2022.

== Synopsis ==
An aspiring documentarian and two conservationists venture into the Australian outback to record the animals displaced by bushfires, hoping to preserve the forests, whereupon they discover a terrifying new sub-species descended from the supposedly extinct Thylacoleo carnifex.

== Cast ==
- Alexandra Park as Bailey
- Sisi Stringer as Grace
- Harry Greenwood as Ben
- Darren Gilshenan as Ranger Matt
- Brendan Rock as Gary
- Holly the dog as Goose

== Production ==
Developed from an original concept by Dancing Road, Carnifex is an environmental horror/thriller.

=== Filming locations ===
Carnifex was shot in the South Australian locations of Adelaide, Adelaide Hills, Belair National Park, Port Adelaide, Morialta Conservation Park, Lobethal, and Gorge Wildlife Park.

=== Director's notes ===
Carnifex is one of many horror films set in the Australian outback. Director and editor Sean Lahiff tells FilmInk about the location:

It’s the unknown. It’s such a vast country. We can’t know exactly everything that’s out there, and I love the idea of playing on the fear of the unknown. At night time, it’s just an endless sprawl of forest, and that’s terrifying for me. Even just the sounds — up until making this film, I hadn’t heard a koala doing a mating call before. The Australian native animals make some crazy noises, and I love that. I wanted to share that with audiences around the world because it’s so unique.

== Release ==
Carnifex premiered at the Sitges Film Festival in Sitges, Catalonia, Spain, on 6 October 2022. Following its screening at Adelaide Film Festival on 22 October 2022, it premiered in Australian cinemas on 1 December 2022.

In Sweden it was released on Australia Day in January 2024, distributed by Cinecct Sweden. Arvet Agency managed the film rights for the Nordic countries in 2024.

== Reception ==
=== Critical response ===
Carnifex is a textbook 1970s-era monster mash-up. Paul Byrnes on December 2, 2022, The Sydney Morning Herald

Carnifex is a serviceable man vs. beast outing that embraces tension over gore. Peter Gray on December 01, 2022, The AU Review

The bush outshines the beast in this classily-made Australian horror story. Penelope Debelle on October 31, 2022, The New Daily

Skådespelarna är bra, framför allt Alexandra Park, och filmen känns faktiskt som en dokumentär, vilket gör den lite unik. (Eng. The actors are good, above all Alexandra Park, and the film actually feels like a documentary, which makes it a bit unique) Pidde Andersson on January 25, 2024, Toppraffel!
