= Stuart Lafferty =

American actor

- Born: Stuart Lyle Lafferty; October 1, 1987 (age 38); Hemet, California, U.S.
- Occupations: Actor; model; producer
- Years active: 2005–present
- Relatives: James Lafferty (brother) Alexandra Park (sister-in-law)

Stuart Lyle Lafferty (born October 1, 1987) is an American actor. He is the younger brother of James Lafferty.

== Early life ==
Lafferty was born in Hemet, California, to Angelica and Jeffrey Lafferty, who own a local construction company. His older brother is actor James Lafferty. He attended Hemet High School, where he played basketball for the Bulldogs.

== Career ==
He has modeled for stores such as Ocean Pacific, Champs Sports, and L.L. Bean and began performing in commercials at a young age. He has also appeared on One Tree Hill with his older brother in season 1 episode 22; "The Games That Play Us" and in season 2 episode 19; "I'm Wide Awake, It's Morning". Lafferty also appears alongside his brother in Kate Voegele's "Only Fooling Myself" music video and he played and served as a producer of the short film Hours Before.

== Filmography ==
Year	Title	Role	Notes
2005	One Tree Hill	Jarret Green	Uncredited; Episode: "I'm Wide Awake, It's Morning"
2007	Death Sentence	Brendan Hume	
2009	Quantum Apocalypse	Leo Marshall	Television film
2010	Hours Before	Peter McMillan	Short film; also producer
2014	Battered	Lewis Waco	Also consulting producer
2021–present	Everyone Is Doing Great	n/a	Co-producer; executive producer
