= Red Right Hand (film) =

2024 film by Ian and Eshom Nelms

- Theatrical release poster
- Directed by: Ian Nelms; Eshom Nelms
- Written by: Jonathan Easley
- Produced by: Basil Iwanyk; Erica Lee; Mike Gabrawy; Jason Tamasco; Zak Kristofek; Michelle Lang
- Starring: Orlando Bloom; Andie MacDowell; Scott Haze; Garret Dillahunt; Mo McRae; Brian Geraghty
- Cinematography: Johnny Derango
- Edited by: Traton Lee
- Music by: Mondo Boys
- Production companies: Traction; Asbury Park Pictures
- Distributed by: Redbox Entertainment; Magnolia Pictures
- Release date: February 23, 2024
- Running time: 111 minutes
- Country: United States
- Language: English
- Box office: $116,000

Red Right Hand is a 2024 American action thriller film directed by Ian and Eshom Nelms and starring Orlando Bloom and Andie MacDowell.

Red Right Hand was released on February 23, 2024.

== Plot ==
Cash is trying to live an honest and quiet life taking care of his recently orphaned niece Savannah in an Appalachian town in Odim County. When the sadistic kingpin Big Cat, who runs the town, forces him back into her services, Cash learns he is capable of anything—even killing—to protect the town and the only family he has left.

As the journey gets harder, Cash is drawn into a nightmare that blurs the lines between good and evil.

== Cast ==
- Orlando Bloom as Cash
- Andie MacDowell as Big Cat
- Scott Haze as Finney
- Garret Dillahunt as Wilder
- Mo McRae as Deputy Duke Parks
- James Lafferty as Lazarus
- Brian Geraghty as Sheriff Hollister
- Chapel Oaks as Savannah
- Kenneth Miller as The Buck
- Nicholas Logan as The Doe

== Production ==
Principal photography occurred in April 2022 in Campbellsburg, Shepherdsville, and New Castle, Kentucky.

In May 2022, Redbox Entertainment was announced to be the film's distributor in the United States.

In January 2023, the film went to post-production.

== Release ==
The film was released in theaters and on VOD on February 23, 2024.

== Reception ==
On the review aggregator website Rotten Tomatoes, 52% of 21 critics' reviews are positive, with an average rating of 5.6/10.
