= Cudlee Creek Conservation Park =

Protected area in South Australia

- IUCN category III (natural monument or feature)
- Location within South Australia
- Location: South Australia
- Nearest city: Gumeracha
- Coordinates: 34°50′19″S 138°50′32″E
- Area: 49 ha (120 acres)
- Established: 29 April 1971
- Governing body: Department for Environment and Water

Cudlee Creek Conservation Park (formerly Cudlee Creek National Park Reserve) is a protected area located in the Australian state of South Australia in the locality of Cudlee Creek in the Adelaide Hills state government region about 12 kilometres (7.5 mi) south-east of the state capital of Adelaide and about 4 kilometres (2.5 mi) south-west of the town centre in Gumeracha.

The conservation park consists of land in section 57 in the cadastral unit of the Hundred of Talunga which is bounded to the east by Gorge Road and in part by the Torrens River whose watercourse is located within the conservation park's boundaries at times.

It was proclaimed on 29 April 1971 as the Cudlee Creek National Parks Reserve under the National Parks Act 1966. It was reconstituted on 27 April 1972 as the Cudlee Creek Conservation Park upon the proclamation of the National Parks and Wildlife Act 1972. As of 2016, it covered an area of 49 hectares (120 acres).

In 1980, it was described as follows:

A small park with open forest representative of the Adelaide hills region and containing excellent bird habitat. The River Torrens flows through a portion of the park, where native hydrophyllic species are preserved. … consisting of a steep hillside clothed with Eucalyptus obliqua / E. goniocalyx / E. viminalis open forest over an understorey of Pteridium esculentum. On the lower slopes and along the river course E. camaldulensis open forest over Acacia melanoxylon and Banksia marginata occur. The steep slopes are in disturbed natural condition but the lower slopes and riverbank are dominated by an understorey of blackberry (Rubus sp.) and some gorse (Ulex europaeus).

The conservation park is classified as an IUCN Category III protected area. In 1980, it was listed on the now-defunct Register of the National Estate.

== See also ==
- Protected areas of South Australia
