= Matthew Atkinson =

American actor (born 1988)

- Born: John Matthew Atkinson; December 27, 1988 (age 37); Marietta, Georgia, U.S.
- Occupation: Actor
- Years active: 2009–present
- Spouse: Brytnee Ratledge (m. 2023)
- Children: 2

John Matthew Atkinson (born December 27, 1988) is an American actor. He is best known for playing the roles of Austin Travers on the CBS soap opera The Young and the Restless (2014 to 2015) and Thomas Forrester on the CBS soap opera The Bold and the Beautiful (2019 to 2025). He was also a regular cast member on the ABC Family series Jane by Design (2012).

== Early life ==
Atkinson was born in Marietta, Georgia. He has one sibling, an older brother. His father was a salesman and the family moved frequently because of his work. They lived in Alabama and Mississippi before returning to Georgia and settling in Kennesaw. While growing up, he was a skateboarder and he played baseball. He became involved in theater while he was in high school. After graduation, he moved to Atlanta to take college courses. He eventually decided to move to Los Angeles and pursue acting. Atkinson is of Native American and Irish descent.

== Career ==
Atkinson made his film debut in The Blind Side (2009). He guest starred on One Tree Hill, Drop Dead Diva, and CSI: Crime Scene Investigation. He appeared in the short films 3 1/2 and Why You Goin' Out With My Sister?

In 2012, Atkinson guest starred on the web series Fletcher Drive. He joined the cast of Hot Mess, a pilot for MTV that wasn't picked up. He became a regular cast member on the ABC Family series Jane by Design, playing Nick Fadden. After the cancellation of Jane by Design, Atkinson had a recurring role as Zach on Parenthood, playing the role from 2013 to 2015. He guest starred on Newsreaders in 2014.

Atkinson was cast as Austin Travers on the CBS soap opera The Young and the Restless in March 2014. The role was initially recurring, but he was soon put on contract. His first airdate was April 17, 2014. The character was killed off in February 2015, but Atkinson continued to appear in flashbacks, last airing August 13, 2015. He guest starred on The Middle and Young & Hungry in 2015. He appeared in the short films Happily Ever After and All In.

In 2016, Atkinson appeared in the Lifetime movie Inspired to Kill. In 2017, he starred in the TV movie Sisters of the Groom. Atkinson guest starred on Powerless. He also had a recurring role on NCIS: Los Angeles. Atkinson played Josh in the film Eruption: LA in 2018.

Atkinson joined the cast of the CBS soap opera The Bold and the Beautiful as Thomas Forrester. His first airdate was March 14, 2019. The role had previously been played by Pierson Fodé, who left the show in 2018. Atkinson played Griff Shores in the Lifetime movie Psycho Party Planner in 2020. He had a recurring role on Everyone Is Doing Great in 2021.

== Personal life ==
Atkinson plays both acoustic and electric guitar. He has also played the saxophone, piano, xylophone, and drums, but mostly considers himself to be a guitarist.

He has run marathons in Chicago, Big Sur, and Atlanta.

Atkinson met actress Brytnee Ratledge at the gym and they later reconnected on social media. They were married in Lake Tahoe on November 8, 2023. In July 2024, they announced that they are expecting their first child. Their son was born in 2024. The couple announced on Instagram that they are expecting their second child, a daughter. She was born in August 2026.

== Filmography ==
=== Film ===
Year	Title	Role	Notes
2009	The Blind Side	Valet Parker	
2009	3 1/2	Secret Service No.1	Short film
2010	Why You Goin' Out with My Sister?	Alex	Short film
2015	Happily Ever After	Jake Ryan	Short film
2016	All In	Tommy	Short film
2018	Eruption: LA	Josh	

=== Television ===
Year	Title	Role	Notes
2009	One Tree Hill	Nathan Actor	Episode: "Screenwriter's Blues"
2009	Drop Dead Diva	Kyle Nevins	Episode: "The 'F' Word"
2010	CSI: Crime Scene Investigation	Barry	Episode: "Fracked"
2012	Jane by Design	Nick Fadden	Series regular; 18 episodes
2013	Hot Mess	Nick Jones	Unaired pilot
2013–2015	Parenthood	Zach	8 episodes
2014–2015	The Young and the Restless	Austin Travers	Series regular: April 17, 2014 – August 12, 2015
2014	Newsreaders	Zack Frost	Episode: "The Journey of an iPhone; Restaurant Plague"
2015	The Middle	Finn	Episode: "Flirting with Disaster"
2015	Young & Hungry	Jason	Episode: "Young & Earthquake"
2016	Sisters of the Groom	Ben Reynolds	Television film
2017–2018	NCIS: Los Angeles	Keith Stiger	2 episodes
2017	Inspired to Kill	Jason	Television film
2017	Powerless	Alex / Olympian	Episode: "Sinking Day"
2019–2025	The Bold and the Beautiful	Thomas Forrester	Series regular (2019–2024); Guest (2025)
2020	Psycho Party Planner	Griff Shores	Television film
2021	Everyone Is Doing Great	Jaxson "Jax" Bridger	3 episodes

=== Web series ===
Year	Title	Role	Notes
2012	Fletcher Drive	The Perfect Boyfriend	Episode: "The Perfect Boyfriend"
