= Paul Teal =

American actor (1989–2024)

- Teal as Dan in USS Christmas, 2020
- Born: Paul Joseph Teal; July 18, 1989; Wilmington, North Carolina, U.S.
- Died: November 15, 2024 (aged 35); Raleigh, North Carolina, U.S.
- Education: William Esper Studio; T. Schreiber Studio
- Occupation: Actor
- Years active: 2010–2024
- Notable work: One Tree Hill
- Website: www.paulteal.com

Paul Joseph Teal (July 18, 1989 – November 15, 2024) was an American actor of film, television and theatre, from Wilmington, North Carolina. He was best known for portraying Josh Avery in the American drama One Tree Hill, in its seventh season. A graduate of the William Esper Studio and the T. Schreiber Studio, Teal debuted in acting with One Tree Hill in 2010 and had minor and recurring roles in productions until his death in 2024.

== Early life and education ==
Paul Joseph Teal was born in Wilmington, North Carolina, on July 18, 1989. He started taking part in theatrical productions at the age of 12, going by the stage name "JoJo". As a teenager, Teal performed at musicals in Wilmington as a part of choirs. He graduated from John T. Hoggard High School. Teal later received training from the William Esper Studio and the T. Schreiber Studio.

== Career ==
Teal's credits include American Rust, Shots Fired, George & Tammy, The Staircase, Dynasty, Fear Street Part Two: 1978, Descendants: The Rise of Red, Good Behavior, Outer Banks, The Walking Dead: World Beyond, Deep Water, and Lilly. He also had a role in The Hunting Wives, which was released after his death, in 2025. Teal's last appearances were on Lilly and Descendants: The Rise of Red.

Teal was best known for his role as Josh Avery on One Tree Hill, whom he portrayed during the seventh season of the series, for seven episodes. It was his first television appearance.

Teal frequently performed at local Wilmington theatres; including the Opera House Theatre Company, the Thalian Association Community Theatre and the Techmoja Dance and Theater Company.

== Personal life and death ==
Teal was dating a fellow Outer Banks and The Hunting Wives actor from September 2022.

Teal was found to have a neuroendocrine tumor in his pancreas in April 2024. He died of the disease at a hospital in Raleigh, North Carolina, on November 15, 2024, at age 35.

== Filmography ==
Year	Title	Role	Notes
2010	One Tree Hill	Josh Avery	Season 7; 7 episodes
2013	Psychodrama	Friendly Choker	1 episode
2016	Good Behavior	Steve	1 episode
2017	Shots Fired	Male Model Supporter	1 episode
2019	Dynasty	Male Reporter	1 episode
2020	The Walking Dead: World Beyond	Walter	1 episode
2020	Outer Banks	Crewman	2 episodes
2020	USS Christmas	Dan	
2021	TWD World Beyond: Episode Diaries	Guest Star	
2021	Fear Street Part Two: 1978	Young Officer Kapinski	
2021	American Rust	Deputy #2	1 episode
2022	Deep Water	Deputy Clark	
2022	The Staircase	Brad Wolgamott	3 episodes
2022	George & Tammy	Back-Up Vocalist #1	1 episode
2024	Descendants: The Rise of Red	Aviator	
2024	Lilly	Timothy Granger	
2025	The Hunting Wives	Pastor Pete	6 episodes Posthumous
TBA	1st Memory	Cameron	Posthumous
