= Nelms brothers =

American filmmaking duo

Eshom Nelms (c. 1978) and Ian Nelms (c. 1979), together known as the Nelms brothers, are American filmmakers. They are known for directing Fatman (2020) and Red Right Hand (2024). They also directed the films Waffle Street (2015) and Small Town Crime (2017).

They grew up in Woodlake, California. They attended and graduated from Mt. Whitney High School.

== Select filmography as directors ==
- Waffle Street (2015)
- Small Town Crime (2017)
- Fatman (2020)
- Red Right Hand (2024)
