= Waffle Street =

- Theatrical release poster
- Directed by: Esholm Nelms; Ian Nelms
- Written by: Autumn McAlpin; Esholm Nelms; Ian Nelms
- Starring: James Lafferty; Julie Gonzalo; Dale Dickey; Marshall Bell; Danny Glover
- Cinematography: Johnny Derango
- Edited by: Traton Lee
- Music by: Will VanderWyden
- Production company: MarVista Entertainment
- Distributed by: MarVista Entertainment
- Release date: September 24, 2015
- Running time: 86 minutes
- Country: United States
- Language: English

Waffle Street is a 2015 American drama/comedy film directed by Eshom Nelms and Ian Nelms and starring Danny Glover and James Lafferty. It is a film adaptation of James Adams’ memoir of the same name, published by Sourced Media Books in 2011. The riches-to-rags story follows Adams’ journey of self-discovery and redemption after losing his job as vice president of a multi-billion dollar hedge fund and finding work as a server at a local 24-hour diner.

Waffle Street was filmed in Lehi, Utah in 2014, with most of the scenes being filmed in a local diner called One Man Band. It was named winner of Best Narrative Feature at the 2015 Hollywood Film Festival, the Audience Award Best Feature at the 2015 Red Rock Film Festival, and the Andretta Carpe Diem Award for Best Film at the 2015 Woodstock Film Festival. It initially released on September 24, 2015.

== Plot ==
Due to the 2008 financial crisis, James "Jimmy" Adams (James Lafferty) gets laid off from his Wall Street hedge fund manager job. Feeling a sense of guilt for his role in the 2008 financial crisis, Adams decides to find a more honest and gratifying job than his previous profession. After several unsuccessful efforts applying to a variety of blue-collar jobs, Adams is hired as a graveyard shift server at Papa’s Chicken and Waffles, a local 24-hour diner chain (the restaurant was renamed in new versions of the book and in the film).

Though many of his coworkers are ex-convicts, he begins to find unlikely friendships, especially with short-order cook Edward Collins (Danny Glover). Collins becomes somewhat of a mentor for Adams, teaching him valuable life lessons about hard work and finance from a fresh perspective. Adams soon sets his sights on owning the Papa’s franchise and works relentlessly to meet the 1000-hour minimum required. Tensions build between Adams and his wife, Becky (Julie Gonzalo), as he downgrades their house and cars to finance his goal.

Overall, his time working at Papa’s offers Adams new insights both professionally and personally. After six months at Papa’s Chicken and Waffles, Adams returns to the finance industry, this time focusing on financial planning and wealth management. He is seen assisting his former Papa’s colleagues with financial planning and business start-up advice.

== Cast ==
- Danny Glover as Edward Collins
- James Lafferty as James “Jimmy” Adams
- Julie Gonzalo as Becky Adams
- Dale Dickey as Crazy Kathy
- Adam Johnson as Matthew Linslow
- Marshall Bell as Miles Drake III
- Ernie Lively as Wright Adams
- Yolanda Wood as Jaqui White
- Aubrey Reynolds as Mary Lynn Parks
- Michelle Lang as Nancy Linslow

== Awards and selections ==
- Winner Best Narrative Feature, Hollywood Film Festival 2015
- Winner Audience Award Best Feature, Red Rock Film Festival 2015
- Winner Andretta Carpe Diem Award, Woodstock Film Festival 2015
- Winner Screenwriter Award, Coronado Island Film Festival 2016
- Official Selection, Closing Night Film, Tallgrass Film Festival 2015
- Official Selection, People’s Choice Competition Biff Year ‘Round 2015
- Official Selection, Cucalorus Film Festival 2015
- Official Selection, Macau International Movie Festival 2015
- Official Selection, Heartland Film Festival 2015
- Official Selection, On Location: Memphis Film Festival 2015
- Official Selection, Ojai Film Festival 2015
- Official Selection, Beloit International Film Festival 2016
