= Small Town Crime =

- Theatrical release poster
- Directed by: Eshom Nelms; Ian Nelms
- Written by: Eshom Nelms; Ian Nelms
- Produced by: John J. Kelly; Brad Johnson; Parisa Caviani
- Starring: John Hawkes; Anthony Anderson; Clifton Collins Jr.; Michael Vartan; Caity Lotz; James Lafferty; Robert Forster; Octavia Spencer
- Cinematography: Johnny Derango
- Edited by: Traton Lee
- Music by: Chris Westlake
- Production companies: 6 Foot Films; Avva Pictures; John J. Kelly Entertainment
- Distributed by: DirecTV Cinema; Saban Films
- Release dates: March 11, 2017 (SXSW); January 19, 2018 (United States)
- Running time: 91 minutes
- Country: United States
- Language: English

Small Town Crime is a 2017 American neo-noir thriller film directed by Eshom Nelms and Ian Nelms. It stars John Hawkes as an alcoholic ex-cop who discovers a woman left for dead on the side of a road and finds himself compelled to locate the killer. As he investigates further, he encounters several shady characters and inadvertently puts his family in danger. It also stars Anthony Anderson, Clifton Collins Jr., Michael Vartan (in his last film role to date), Caity Lotz, James Lafferty, Robert Forster and Octavia Spencer.

The film premiered at SXSW on March 11, 2017, and was made available to watch on DirecTV Cinema beginning December 21, 2017 before getting released in select theaters January 19, 2018, by Saban Films.

== Plot ==
Alcoholic ex-cop Mike Kendall, who is out of the force after a deadly incident which cost him the life of his partner, moonlights as a private investigator under the name of Jack Winter, to middling success. He lives on the kindness of his adopted sister Kelly Banks and her husband Teddy.

While on a drive, he discovers a young prostitute left for dead at the side of the street. He takes her to the hospital, only for her to die of her injuries the next day. Answering the young woman's phone, Mike has an unfriendly encounter with a man on the other line. He decides to take on the case despite his former police colleagues repeatedly warning him off, revealing that he was inebriated on the night of his partner's death, and his drunken return fire not only killed the suspect, but also the kidnapped girl in his car trunk.

After interrogating the young woman's (whose name is revealed to be Kristy Nevile) parents, Mike is contacted by Kristy's affluent grandfather, Steve Yendel, and officially hired to get to the bottom of the case. After the violent death of a second prostitute named Rose, Mike interrogates a bar owner named Randy, who directs him to Ivy Oarblocker, who was friends with Rose and Kristy. Arriving home, he is ambushed by Mood, pimp of the three girls and the voice on Kristy's phone. Mood reveals that he is also after the killer, and enlists Mike's help. As Mike seeks out the Oarblocker family, he discovers her missing, and that men who pretended to be cops had asked after her family. He also discovers that Randy had been hiding Ivy somewhere, and finds himself being followed in his car.

After retrieving his gun from Teddy, Mike forces Randy to reveal where Ivy had been hiding. As he interrogates Ivy, Mike finds out that the three girls and Randy had been behind an extortion scheme against powerful businessmen who had procured the girls' services as prostitutes. Kristy and Rose were killed by assassins, hired by the businessmen to silence them, and now Ivy is next. As Mike, Randy and Ivy drive to the police station, they are ambushed by the assassins. Though they manage to throw the assassins off, Randy is killed. Mike tries to contact Teddy but finds out he had been kidnapped by the assassins, who threaten to kill Teddy if Mike does not surrender Ivy.

Mike negotiates a hostage exchange, all while planning an ambush with Mood and Yendel. It devolves into a massive shootout where both assassins are killed and all three men injured. The film ends with Mike taking his private investigator exam, the arrests of two of the three businessmen who hired the assassins, with Mood and Yendel hunting down the third man in Mexico.

== Cast ==
- John Hawkes as Mike Kendall / P.I. Jack Winter, an ex-cop now working as a private investigator
- Octavia Spencer as Kelly Banks, Teddy's wife and Mike's adopted sister
- Anthony Anderson as Teddy Banks, Kelly's husband and Mike's best friend, who acts like a brother to him
- Robert Forster as Steve Yendel, Kristy's grandfather
- Clifton Collins Jr. as "Mood", a hardened but caring pimp who is hellbent on exacting revenge on whoever killed his prostitutes
- Michael Vartan as Detective Scott Crawford
- Caity Lotz as Heidi
- James Lafferty as Tony Lama
- Daniel Sunjata as Detective Pete Whitman
- Dale Dickey as Leslie
- Jeremy Ratchford as "Orthopedic"
- Don Harvey as Randy
- Michelle Lang as Tina
- Robyn Lively as Deborah Nevile
- Bart Johnson as Carl Nevile
- Stefanie Scott as Ivy Oarblocker
- Stefania Barr as Kristen "Kristy" Nevile, the first murder victim

== Production ==
Principal photography began in February 2016 and took place over 35 days in Utah.

== Release ==
The film premiered at South by Southwest Film Festival on March 11, 2017. DirecTV and Saban Films later secured the North American distribution rights, and released the film on January 19, 2018.

=== Critical response ===
On review aggregator Rotten Tomatoes, the film has an approval rating of 82% based on 38 reviews, with an average rating of 7.3/10. The site's critics consensus reads: "Small Town Crime makes for a satisfying modern noir outing, largely thanks to the all-around impressive efforts of a solidly stacked cast led by John Hawkes." On Metacritic, the film has a weighted average score of 68 out of 100, based on 12 critics, indicating "generally favorable reviews".
