= Millbrook, South Australia =

Coordinates: 34°49′S 138°49′E

Millbrook Adelaide, South Australia
- Millbrook Hotel in 1886 since demolished

- Population: 133 (SAL 2021)
- Postcode(s): 5231
- LGA(s): Adelaide Hills Council
- State electorate(s): Newland
- Federal division(s): Mayo

Millbrook is a locality in the Adelaide Hills, outside Adelaide, South Australia.

It borders Inglewood to the north and Cudlee Creek to the south. It is home to a state primary school and small hamlet settlement, connected to Cudlee Creek. The original township within the valley was demolished to make way for the Millbrook Reservoir. Buildings at this location included a small private school and a hotel.

The Milbrook Primary School was destroyed as part of the Ash Wednesday fires in 1983. A new school was subsequently built on the site It is now most renowned for the location of a large water reservoir, operated by the South Australian government for Adelaide's water supply. The reservoir remains as a pumping station point for the Kangaroo Creek reservoir.

These people moved into the Cudlee Creek area when the reservoir works began in 1914.

The former township of Chain of Ponds was removed due to the possible reservoir's impact upon the settlement.
