= Cudlee Creek =

- Suburb
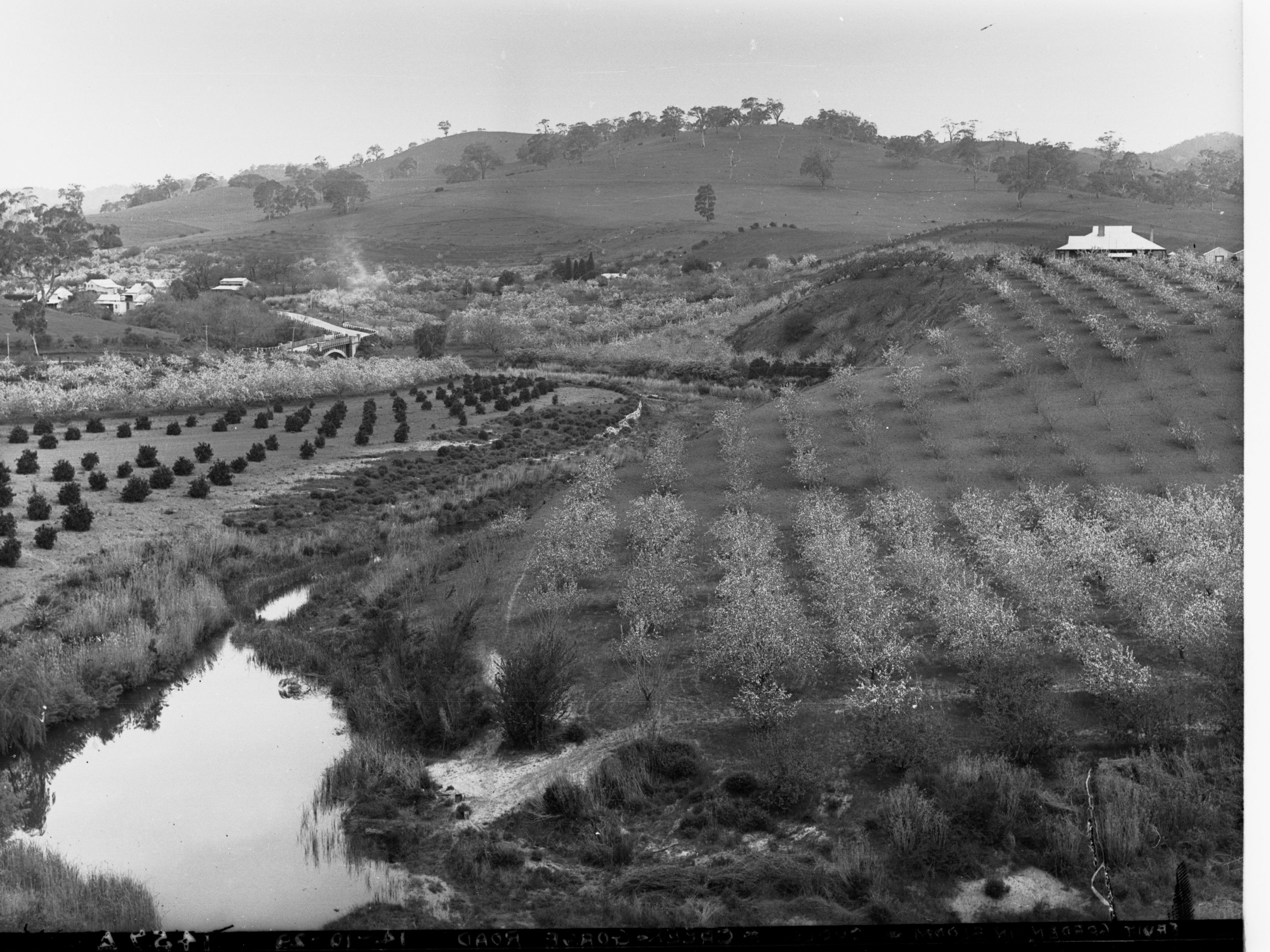
- Fruit Garden in Bloom at Cudlee Creek, 14 October 1929

- Coordinates: 34°50′0″S 138°50′0″E
- Country: Australia
- State: South Australia
- LGA: Adelaide Hills Council
- Location: 30 km (19 mi) from Adelaide
- Established: 1838

Government
  - State electorate: Newland (until 2014), Morialta (from 2014)
  - Federal division: Mayo

Population
  - Total: 425 (SAL 2021)
- Postcode: 5232
Suburbs around Cudlee Creek
Millbrook	Chain of Ponds	Gumeracha
Paracombe	Cudlee Creek	Kenton Valley
Castambul; Montacute	Lenswood	Lobethal

Cudlee Creek is a small town near Adelaide, South Australia. It is located in the Adelaide Hills Council local government area.

== History ==
The name Cudlee Creek is probably derived from the Kaurna word kadli, meaning the Dingo Creek.

The first European inhabitants of Cudlee Creek settled in 1838, when William Kelly, from the Isle of Man, came to the area and established the Sulby Glen estate. A district history states that Sulby Glen was "...well-known for cheese-making. Quite a lot of wheat was grown; fruit trees were planted and a lot of potatoes marketed". It became a significant exporter of apples and pears, and a cold store, built in 1922 for a fruit-growers' cooperative, is the most prominent building in the town.

In 2019, a big bushfire burnt out parts of the town and the areas around it.

== Geography ==
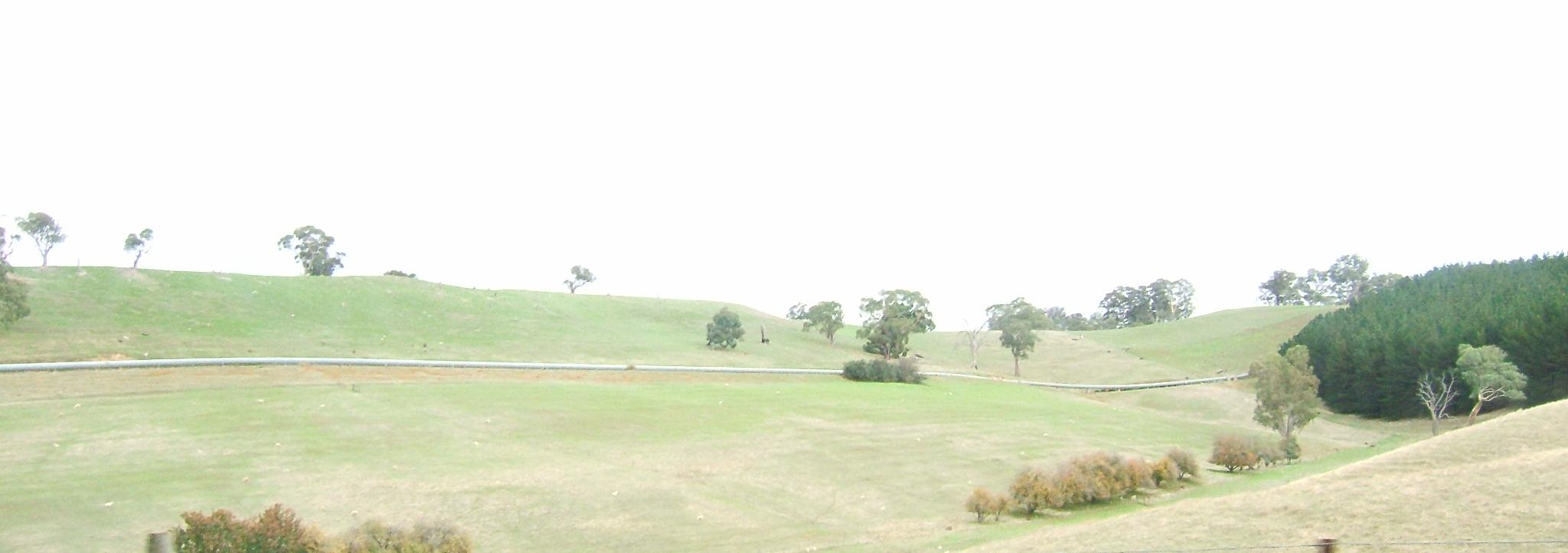
Water pipeline in Cudlee Creek

Cudlee Creek is located south of Chain of Ponds on the road out of Adelaide via Athelstone (Gorge Road). The ABS 2006 census records 764 people living in 304 dwellings.

== Facilities ==
Cudlee Creek has a Soldiers Memorial Hall, Caravan Park, Pub, Tennis Courts, Golf Course and a Country Fire Station.

Points of interest:

- Gorge Wildlife Park, one of the largest privately owned animal parks in Australia (opened 1965)
- An old icecreamery now converted to a restaurant (opened 1890) known as the Cudlee Cafe
- The popular walking trail, the Heysen Trail passes through the town

The local Primary School, Millbrook Primary School, closed in 2010 after 131 years. The population of the school when it closed was 15 students.

Cudlee Creek Conservation Park on the River Torrens, located near the Gorge Road-Lobethal Road intersection, is home to a variety of birds and marsupials who live in the stringybark, red gum, blue gum and manna gum woodlands on quite steep terrain. It was proclaimed in 1971 and contains no visitor facilities or amenities.

The Fox Creek mountain bike trails in the Mount Crawford forest south of the town. There are 2 km-3 km downhill tracks plus an 8 km cross-country track.

== Transport ==
Gorge Road and Cudlee Creek-Lobethal Road run through the suburb.

The area is not serviced by Adelaide public transport. A coach is operated from Tea Tree Plaza Interchange to Mount Torrens and Mount Pleasant by Link SA. The Bus services the Gorge Wildlife Park, the Cudlee Cafe and Langley Road.
