= Everyone Is Doing Great =

2021 American comedy Series

- Genre: Comedy drama
- Created by: James Lafferty; Stephen Colletti
- Starring: James Lafferty; Stephen Colletti; Alexandra Park
- Country of origin: United States
- Original language: English
- No. of seasons: 2
- No. of episodes: 16

Production
- Executive producers: James Lafferty; Stephen Colletti; Michelle Lang; Johnny Derango; Eshom Nelms; Ian Nelms; Rocque Trem; Stuart Lafferty; Ngoc Nguyen; Alexandra Park; Garret Jason Greer
- Production location: Wilmington, North Carolina
- Production companies: Dadada Media; Derango Pictures; Folly Films; RBL Studios; Sony Pictures Television

Original release
- Network: Hulu
- Release: January 13, 2021
- Network: Netflix
- Release: May 11, 2026

Everyone is Doing Great is an American comedy drama television series. The show originally premiered on Hulu on January 13, 2021. The second season premiered on Netflix on May 11, 2026.

== Premise ==
Five years after the end of their TV show, Eternal, Jeremy Davis and Seth Stewart lean on each other as they navigate their lives.

== Cast ==
=== Main ===
- James Lafferty as Jeremy Davis
- Stephen Colletti as Seth Stewart
- Alexandra Park as Andrea Cooper-Davis
- Cariba Heine as Isabella Baker
- Tom Fugedi as Jason Reiss
- Karissa Lee Staples as Sarah Dinsey
- Sean Carrigan as Michael Niccoli
- Bob Turton as Phillip VanGilmore
- Michelle Lang as Elizabeth Miller
- Matthew Atkinson as Jaxson "Jax" Bridger (season 1)
- Bryan Greenberg as Miles (season 2)
- Jessica McNamee as Georgia (season 2)
- Jamie Chung as Amber (season 2)
- Aaron Staton as Coach (season 2)
- Robbie Jones as Ebuka (season 2)
- Merritt Patterson as Sage (season 2)
- Nichelle Hines as Nichelle (season 2)
- Phoenix Washington as Tony (season 2)

=== Guest ===
- Aparna Brielle as Aly
- Deborah Baker Jr. as April (season 1)
- Thomas Cocquerel as Oliver Westlake (season 1)
- Janet Gunn as Judy Stewart (season 1)
- Jeremy Ratchford as Frank Stewart (season 1)
- Stephanie Lee as Yun (season 1)
- Camille Chen as Kat (season 2)
- Rhys Wakefield as Rex (season 2)
- Arden Rose (season 2)
- Michael Patrick McGill as Ricky (season 2)
- Ryan Carnes as Jean-Paul (season 2)

== Series overview ==
Season	Episodes	Originally released	Network
1	8	January 13, 2021	Hulu
2	8	May 11, 2026	Netflix

== Episodes ==
=== Season 1 (2021) ===
No. overall	No. in season	Title	Directed by	Written by	Original release date
1	1	"Pilot"	James Lafferty	James Lafferty & Stephen Colletti	January 13, 2021
Jeremy helps his former co-star Seth practice for an upcoming audition. During the audition, Seth is filmed and is asked to hump a pillow to look as if he is having sex with the pillow. After a night out with Sarah and a friend, Jeremy doesn't cheat on his wife. He later learns that his wife wants a divorce.
2	2	"Figure it Out"	James Lafferty	James Lafferty & Stephen Colletti	January 13, 2021
A month after Andrea asked for a divorce, Jeremy is crashing at Seth's while Andrea has their huge house. Jeremy learns that he is broke. After being denied the role, Seth is told about a low-budget slasher film where he would be killed off pretty quickly. While hesitating on taking the role, he bumps into his ex who left him for another man. He then decides to take the role.
3	3	"So it Seems"	James Lafferty	James Lafferty & Stephen Colletti	January 13, 2021
After a night out with Sarah, Seth buys some law books so he can understand what she talked to him about. Before shooting for the film, Seth practices his moves. Later during filming, he is disappointed when his death isn't heroic. In between takes, some of the younger cast takes his photo, something he isn't happy about. While playing dead, he remembers filming for Eternal. During the shooting of Eternal, he and Andrea treat the crew horribly. While Seth is away, Jeremy and Andrea partake in mediation before their divorce. After the second mediation, Jeremy is told of a way to make money.
4	4	"North Carolina"	James Lafferty	James Lafferty & Stephen Colletti	January 13, 2021
5	5	"Edible Engagement"	James Lafferty	James Lafferty & Stephen Colletti	January 13, 2021
6	6	"What Are You Afraid Of"	Stephen Colletti	James Lafferty & Stephen Colletti	January 13, 2021
7	7	"Workin' on Workin'"	James Lafferty	James Lafferty & Stephen Colletti	January 13, 2021
8	8	"Doing Great"	James Lafferty	James Lafferty & Stephen Colletti	January 13, 2021

=== Season 2 (2026) ===
No. overall	No. in season	Title	Directed by	Written by	Original release date
9	1	"For Better Or For Worse"	N/A (Note: The director is uncredited in this episode)	James Lafferty & Stephen Colletti	May 11, 2026
10	2	"Imitating Life"	Stephen Colletti	James Lafferty & Stephen Colletti	May 11, 2026
11	3	"Whatever Floats Your Boat"	N/A	Alexandra Park; James Lafferty & Stephen Colletti	May 11, 2026
12	4	"Finding the Vain"	Michelle Lang	James Lafferty & Stephen Colletti	May 11, 2026
13	5	"Scottish Fey"	N/A	Alexandra Park; James Lafferty & Stephen Colletti	May 11, 2026
14	6	"Is it Just Me?"	Johnny Derango	Stuart Lafferty; James Lafferty & Stephen Colletti	May 11, 2026
15	7	"Blue Blue Whine"	Stephen Colletti	James Lafferty & Stephen Colletti	May 11, 2026
16	8	"Commit"	Michelle Lang	James Lafferty & Stephen Colletti	May 11, 2026
