= Harry Greenwood (actor) =

Australian actor (born 1989)

- Born: Harry Weaving Greenwood; 1989 (age 36–37)
- Education: National Institute of Dramatic Art (BFA) (2012)
- Occupation: Actor
- Years active: 2006–present
- Parent(s): Hugo Weaving (father); Katrina Greenwood (mother)
- Relatives: Samara Weaving (cousin)

Harry Weaving Greenwood (born 1989) is an Australian actor.

== Early life and education ==
Harry Greenwood was born in 1989 to actor Hugo Weaving and artist Katrina Greenwood. His sister Holly (born in 1994) is also an artist. He uses his mother's surname, because his parents thought ‘Harry Weaving’ didn’t have the same ring as ‘Harry Greenwood’. He uses Weaving as his middle name.

After dabbling in Arts and Media Production degrees, Greenwood began studying a Bachelor of Dramatic Art (Acting) at National Institute of Dramatic Art (NIDA) when he was 21, graduating in 2012.

== Career ==
In 2013, his first year after graduating from NIDA, Greenwood, 24, made his theatre debut as an angry 16 year old in the Sydney Theatre Company production of Fury. That same year he also starred in short film The Gift.

His breakthrough role was as Digger Bevan Johnson (alongside Kodi Smit-McPhee), in 2015 Nine Network miniseries Gallipoli. He also appeared in 2019 television series Bad Mothers.

Greenwood has appeared in feature films The Nightingale (2018) and True History of the Kelly Gang (2019) alongside Russell Crowe. He also appeared in Mel Gibson's biographical war film Hacksaw Ridge (2016) with his father, although they did not appear in any scenes together.

In 2022, Greenwood starred in Sean Lahiff's debut film as director, Carnifex. A science fiction/horror film with large-scale special effects, the film also stars Alexandra Park and Sisi Stringer, and premiered at the Adelaide Film Festival in October 2022. In 2024 he reunited with Russell Crowe in American crime thriller film Sleeping Dogs, as Richard Finn.

Greenwood's stage roles include STC productions, Cat on a Hot Tin Roof at the Roslyn Packer Theatre (playing Brick; his father also appeared, as Big Daddy) and STC's Cloud Nine.

Greenwood was named one of Casting Guild of Australia's 10 Rising Stars of 2018.

== Filmography ==
=== Film ===
Year	Title	Role	Notes
2008	8	Simon	Segment: "The Water Diary"
2016	Hacksaw Ridge	Henry Brown	
2018	The Nightingale	Jago	
2019	The Dustwalker	Paul	
2019	True History of the Kelly Gang	(Uncredited)	
2021	The Drover's Wife	John MaPharlen	
2022	Carnifex	Ben	
2024	Sleeping Dogs	Richard Finn	
2026	Klara and the Sun	Rex	

=== Television ===
Year	Title	Role	Notes
2010	Kododa	Smokey	TV series
2014	Old School	Zac	6 episodes
2015	Gallipoli	Bevan Johnson	7 episodes
2019	The Commons	Tuly	3 episodes
2019	Bad Mothers	Sam	7 episodes
2020	Operation Buffalo	Baxter	5 episodes
2020	Liberty Street	Will	Episode: "Sophie"
2021	Total Control	Leo Jacobs	6 episodes
2021	Wakefield	Trevor	8 episodes
2022	Bump	Michael	5 episodes
2022	Pieces of Her	Loner	3 episodes
2023	The Clearing	Anton Beaufort	5 episodes
2023	Class of '07	Brendo	Episode: "The Tribe Has Spoken"
2024	Return to Paradise	Byron	1 episode

=== Theatre ===
Year	Title	Role	Notes	Ref.
2013	Fury	Joe	Wharf Theatre, Sydney with STC	
2014	Once in Royal David’s City	German boyfriend / Border guard	Belvoir St Theatre, Sydney	
2014; 2016	The Glass Menagerie	Jim O'Connor	Belvoir St Theatre, Sydney, Malthouse Theatre, Melbourne	
2015	Love and Information		Malthouse Theatre, Melbourne, Wharf Theatre, Sydney with STC	
2016	Back at the Dojo	Young Danny Katz	Belvoir St Theatre	
2017	Cloud Nine	Betty / Edward	Wharf Theatre with STC	
2017	Three Sisters	Tusenbach	Sydney Opera House with STC	
2019	Cat on a Hot Tin Roof	Brick	STC	
2023	The Seagull	Constantine	STC	

== Awards and nominations ==
Year	Work	Award	Category	Result	Ref.
2006	Pacific	Tropfest	Best Young Talent Award	Won	
2017	Cloud 9	Sydney Theatre Awards	Best Male Actor in a Supporting Role in a Mainstage Production	Nominated	
2018	Cloud 9	Helpmann Awards	Best Male Actor in a Supporting Role in a Play	Nominated	
2018	Harry Greenwood	Casting Guild of Australia Awards	Rising Star Award	Won	
2021	Wakefield	AACTA Awards	Best Guest or Supporting Actor in a Television Drama	Nominated	

== Personal life ==
Greenwood's long term partner is director Milena Bennett. His sister Holly Greenwood, is a fine artist whose work is exhibited at the Olsen Gallery in Sydney and the James Makin Gallery in Melbourne. His cousin Samara Weaving is also an established actress.
