= Fatman (2020 film) =

2020 action-comedy film

- Theatrical release poster
- Directed by: Eshom Nelms; Ian Nelms
- Written by: Eshom Nelms; Ian Nelms
- Produced by: Todd Courtney; Nadine de Barros; Michelle Lang; Robert Menzies; Lisa Wolofsky
- Starring: Mel Gibson; Walton Goggins; Marianne Jean-Baptiste
- Cinematography: Johnny Derango
- Edited by: Traton Lee
- Music by: Mondo Boys
- Production companies: Fortitude International; Mammoth Entertainment; Rough House Pictures; Sprockefeller Pictures; Ingenious Media
- Distributed by: Saban Films
- Release date: November 13, 2020
- Running time: 100 minutes
- Country: United States
- Language: English
- Budget: $20 million
- Box office: $1.7 million

Fatman is a 2020 American Christmas black comedy action film written and directed by Eshom Nelms and Ian Nelms, and starring Mel Gibson, Walton Goggins and Marianne Jean-Baptiste. The film is an unorthodox slant on holiday traditions that follows a jaded, gritty Santa Claus who struggles with ennui, production issues, government interference, and an embittered assassin sent by a vengeful naughty kid.

Filmed in Canada and released worldwide on November 13, 2020, the film received mixed reviews from critics.

== Plot ==
Chris Cringle and his wife Ruth operate a Christmas present workshop on an old isolated farm near the small town of North Peak, Alaska. Struggling with declining revenue over the years due to children becoming increasingly vicious, the United States Government, who maintains an interest share in Chris's business because Christmas is a major economic stimulus, starts cutting back on their subsidies. To remedy Chris' income loss, US military Captain Jacobs is sent to propose a two-month contract for producing jet fighter components, which is outright refused. The liaison agents override Chris's misgivings by implying that the next year's Government subsidies will likely decrease. Ruth manages to restore Chris's spirits, who grudgingly accepts their offer only this one time.

Billy Wenan, an immoral and pernicious boy who lives with his ailing old money grandmother, is the quintessential vicious child who commits despicable acts against people he considers his inferiors. On Christmas Eve, Billy receives a lump of coal from Chris, swears revenge, and hires his personal hit man Jonathan Miller to assassinate Chris. Harboring his own bitter childhood grudge against Chris, Miller sets off on a killing spree, finds Chris collecting his mail from the post office, and follows him to his home.

On Chris's farm, Miller kills the US Army guards and infiltrates the workshop until an elf worker raises the alarm. Jacobs evacuates the workers before Miller kills him and blows up the workshop. Chris fights Miller and gains the upper hand, but Miller wounds Chris using a hidden blade and then shoots Chris in the head, leaving him for dead. Ruth kills Miller afterwards, and Chris recovers from his injuries.

Backtracking Miller's assignment, Chris and Ruth pay a visit to Billy and interrupt him spiking his grandmother's milk with fentanyl to cover his check forgeries. Unfazed by the fentanyl, Chris admits he has become lax when dealing with vicious children and warns Billy that he will deal with him if he torments his fellow humans again. Billy can only give an understanding nod. Back at the farm, Chris, Ruth, and the elves start rebuilding the workshop bigger and better with renewed confidence in the future.

== Cast ==
- Mel Gibson as Chris Cringle, a burned-out and apathetic man frustrated with the world turning into an unruly place
- Walton Goggins as Jonathan Miller (credited as "Skinny Man"), a hitman who works in a toy store and has a personal grudge against Chris for "letting him down" in his unhappy childhood
- Marianne Jean-Baptiste as Ruth Cringle, Chris' loving wife and moderating influence
- Chance Hurstfield as Billy Wenan, an overachieving amoral rich kid who is neglected by his parents and is driven to seek revenge after receiving a lump of coal for Christmas
- Robert Bockstael as Captain Jacobs, the commander of the US Army guards assigned to Chris' workshop and his liaison to the US government
- Eric Woolfe as Elf 7, Chris' foreman in the workshop
- Susanne Sutchy as Sandy, a friend of Chris and bartender in North Peak
- Michael Dyson as Herman
- Deborah Grover as Anne Marie, Billy's frail, old money grandmother who requires his care but whose accounts are secretly fleeced by her grandson to finance his assignments for Miller
- Ellison Grier Butler as Christine Crawford, a girl who Billy and Jonathan harassed over her science project being better than Billy's science project
- Ekaterina Baker as Helga
- Robert Reynolds as Ralph
- Paulino Nunes as Weyland Meeks
- John Tokatlidis as Mike, a truck driver
- Sean Devine as a postman
- Sean Tucker as Donald
- Shaun Benson as Lex
- Mikael Conde as Carter
- Ronald Tang as Roger
- Peter Chow as Mr. Chan
- Jason Gosbee as Henshaw
- Bill Lake as Robert Taylor
- Michelle Lang as Lindsay Kemp

== Production ==
Ian and Eshom Nelms originally wrote the screenplay for Fatman in 2006, and had been shopping it around for over 10 years. On May 8, 2019, it was announced that Gibson would play Santa Claus in the film. On January 29, 2020, it was announced that Walton Goggins had joined the cast, and Marianne Jean-Baptiste joined the following month.

Principal photography occurred at the beginning of 2020 in Ottawa, Ontario, including the Ottawa Valley region and the towns of Carleton Place and Mississippi Mills in February 2020. Production wrapped just prior to the widespread film industry shutdowns caused by the COVID-19 pandemic. The climactic shootout sequence took four days to film, with the temperature hitting as low as 36 below zero Celsius.

== Release ==
Saban Films acquired the film's United States distribution rights in September 2020. It was released in the United States in select theaters on November 13, 2020. It also received a limited release in Australia on November 19, 2020.

Fatman was released via digital download on November 17, 2020. It was also released on video-on-demand on November 24, 2020.

== Reception ==
=== Box office and VOD ===
In its opening weekend, the film grossed $108,000 from 259 theaters. In its second weekend the film made $51,266 from 177 theaters, and was also the third-most rented film on FandangoNow, Spectrum, and Apple TV, and fourth on Google Play. It remained in the top four spots on all four platforms the following weekend, while also grossing $11,895 from 42 theaters.

=== Critical response ===
On Metacritic, the film has a weighted average score of 40 out of 100, based on 24 critics, indicating "mixed or average" reviews. On the review aggregator Rotten Tomatoes, the film holds an approval rating of 45% based on 114 reviews, with an average rating of 5.3/10. The website's critics consensus reads, "Fatman takes a surprisingly serious approach to a potentially ludicrous twist on the Santa Claus legend, aiming for edgy but mostly missing the mark."

John DeFore of The Hollywood Reporter gave the film a positive review and wrote, "Less gonzo than it sounds, for better and worse." Julian Roman of MovieWeb also gave the film a positive review and wrote, "Fatman reflects the worst instincts of modern times. It shows how selfishness and immorality can lead to violent outcomes." Hunter Lanier of Film Threat gave the film a 7 out of 10. Chris Bumbray of JoBlo.com gave the film an 8 out of 10.

Bill Goodykoontz of The Arizona Republic awarded the film two stars. Chuck Bowen of Slant Magazine awarded the film one and a half stars out of four. Owen Gleiberman of Variety gave the film a negative review and wrote, "Yet you get the distinct feeling that the Nelms brothers think this is all a lot funnier, crazier, and more resonant than it is."

Alonso Duralde of TheWrap also gave the film a negative review and wrote, "It never makes it past the idea stage, unfortunately, since mixing these disparate genres together would require an absolute mastery of tone that the film can't quite muster." David Ehrlich of IndieWire graded the film a D, saying "Combining the crude spirit of Bad Santa with the grittiness of a Zack Snyder film, Fatman is worse than a lump of coal in your stocking."

== See also ==
- List of Christmas films
