= Alexandra Park (actress) =

Australian actress (born 1989)

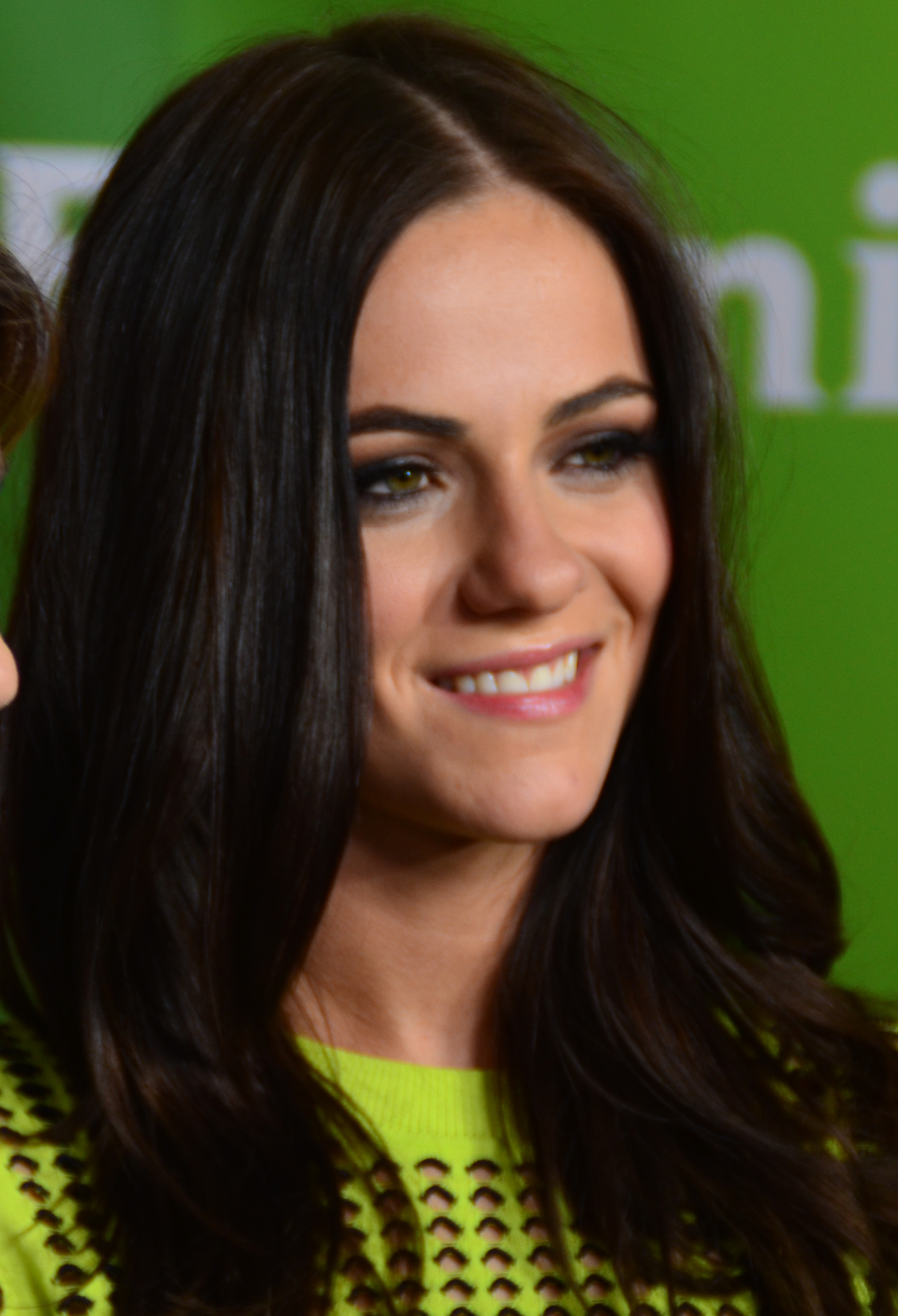
- Park at the Television Critics Association's Press Tour in January 2015
- Born: 14 May 1989 (age 37); Sydney, Australia
- Occupation: Actress
- Years active: 2009–present
- Spouse: James Lafferty (m. 2022)
- Children: 1

Alexandra Park (born 14 May 1989) is an Australian actress. She is known for her role as Claudia Hammond in the Australian soap opera Home and Away in 2009. She also starred in the E! drama series The Royals as Princess Eleanor from 2015 to 2018.

== Career ==
Park made her acting debut in the Australian television series The Elephant Princess in 2011, playing Veronica.

In 2009, she played Claudia Hammond in the soap opera Home and Away. During that time, she appeared in an episode of Packed to the Rafters in 2011. She appeared as Sienna in the 2012 short film Arc.

She also appeared in a 2013 episode of the television series Wonderland as Jodie. From 2015 to 2018, she portrayed Princess Eleanor in the E! original series The Royals.

Park played a filmmaker in the horror thriller film Carnifex, which screened at the Adelaide Film Festival in October 2022. It was South Australian film editor Sean Lahiff's directing debut. In the film, Park's character and two conservationists encounter a terrifying new species after huge bushfires have ravaged the land. Filmed in Kuitpo Forest, the film has large-scale special effects, and stars Sisi Stringer and Harry Greenwood, son of actor Hugo Weaving.

From 2021 to 2026, Park also appeared in Everyone is Doing Great alongside husband James Lafferty.

== Personal life ==
Before getting the role of Princess Eleanor in The Royals, Park was diagnosed with type 1 diabetes which she discussed in her book Sugar High.

In May 2022, she married fiancé James Lafferty in Hawaii after seven years together. In 2026, Lafferty and Park announced via Instagram the birth of their child, River Jay Lafferty born on 4 December 2025.

== Filmography ==
Year	Title	Role	Notes
2009	Home and Away	Claudia Hammond / Robyn Sullivan	TV series (30 episodes)
2011	The Elephant Princess	Veronica	TV series (23 episodes)
2011	Packed to the Rafters	Courtney	TV series (episode: "Risky Business")
2012	Arc	Sienna	Short film
2013	Wonderland	Jodie	TV series (episode: "Comfort Zone")
2015–2018	The Royals	Princess Eleanor Henstridge	TV series (4 seasons; 40 episodes)
2017	12 Feet Deep	Jonna	
2018	Shooting in Vain	Lucy	
2018	Ben Is Back	Cara K.	
2019	In the Dark	Jenny Dickens	TV series (episode: "I Woke Up Like This")
2021–	Everyone is Doing Great	Andrea Cooper-Davis	TV series
2022	Carnifex	Bailey	
2023	Leverage: Redemption	Astrid Pickford	TV series
