= Gorge Wildlife Park =

Zoo in Australia

- Interactive map of Gorge Wildlife Park
- 34°50′30.97″S 138°48′51.59″E
- Date opened: 1965
- Location: Cudlee Creek, South Australia, Australia
- Land area: 5.7 hectares (14 acres)
- Memberships: ZAA
- Website: gorgewildlifepark.com.au

Gorge Wildlife Park is a privately owned sanctuary in the Australian state of South Australia. It is at Cudlee Creek in the Adelaide Hills and continues to be operated by the same family that established it in 1965. It is 30 km northeast of Adelaide. Situated on 14 acres of land, under shaded trees, paths meander among the largest privately owned collection of Australian animals. The park provides contact with a range of Australian native animals as well as exhibits of Australian and exotic animals and birds. A feature is the opportunity for visitors to hold a koala.

Gorge Wildlife Park is involved in protection and preservation of some endangered species such as the brush-tailed rock-wallaby (petrogale penicillata).

== List of species ==
Birds

- Australian boobook owl
- Australian pelican
- Australian white ibis
- Black swan
- Blue peafowl
- Blue-and-gold macaw
- Blue-winged kookaburra
- Brolga
- Budgerigar
- Canadian goose
- Cattle egret
- Common ostrich
- Dusky moorhen
- Egyptian goose
- Emu
- Galah
- Gang-gang cockatoo
- Golden-shouldered parrot
- Green dove
- Green catbird
- Green-winged macaw
- Jabiru
- Lady Amherst's pheasant
- Laughing kookaburra
- Little penguin
- Luzon bleeding-heart
- Magpie goose
- Nankeen kestrel
- New Zealand scaup
- Nicobar pigeon
- Pacific black duck
- Paradise shelduck
- Pied stilt
- Princess parrot
- Radjah shelduck
- Rainbow lorikeet
- Red-tailed black cockatoo
- Ruddy shelduck
- Scarlet-chested parrot
- Southern cassowary
- Star finch
- Sun conure
- Superb fairywren
- Topknot pigeon
- Turquoise parrot
- Wedge-tailed eagle
- Whistling kite
- White-bellied sea eagle
- White-breasted ground dove
- White-headed pigeon
- White-tailed black cockatoo
- Yellow-tailed black cockatoo
- (many others, Gorge has over 150 bird species)

Mammals

- Alpaca
- Arabian camel
- Asian small-clawed otter
- Bare-nosed wombat
- Bilby
- Black-handed spider monkey
- Bolivian squirrel monkey
- Brazilian agouti
- Brush-tailed rock wallaby
- Capybara
- Colombian white-fronted capuchin monkey
- Common marmoset
- Cotton-top tamarin
- Dingo
- Domestic goat
- Domestic sheep
- Emperor tamarin
- European fallow deer
- Ghost bat
- Golden lion tamarin
- Grey-headed flying fox
- Japanese macaque
- Kangaroo Island kangaroo
- Koala
- Lar gibbon
- Meerkat
- Parma wallaby
- Patagonian mara
- Quokka
- Red kangaroo (including albino)
- Red-necked wallaby
- Ring-tailed lemur
- Serval
- Short-beaked echidna
- Southern hairy-nosed wombat
- Spinifex hopping mouse
- Squirrel glider
- Swamp wallaby
- Tammar wallaby
- Tasmanian Devil
- Western grey kangaroo

Reptiles

- Aldabra giant tortoise
- American alligator
- Blood python
- Boa constrictor
- Boyd's forest dragon
- Carolina box turtle
- Carpet python
- Central bearded dragon
- Corn snake
- Eastern water dragon
- Fijian crested iguana
- Freshwater crocodile
- Gila monster
- Green iguana
- Hermann's tortoise
- Lace monitor
- Leopard ctenotus
- Leopard tortoise
- Major skink
- Mesa gecko
- Murray short-necked turtle
- Pig-nosed turtle
- Pink-tongued skink
- Plumed basilisk
- Red-eared slider turtle
- Saw-shelled turtle
- Shingleback lizard
- Southern death adder
- Veiled chameleon
- Western blue-tongued lizard
- White-lipped tree-frog
