= Stephen Colletti =

American actor (born 1986)

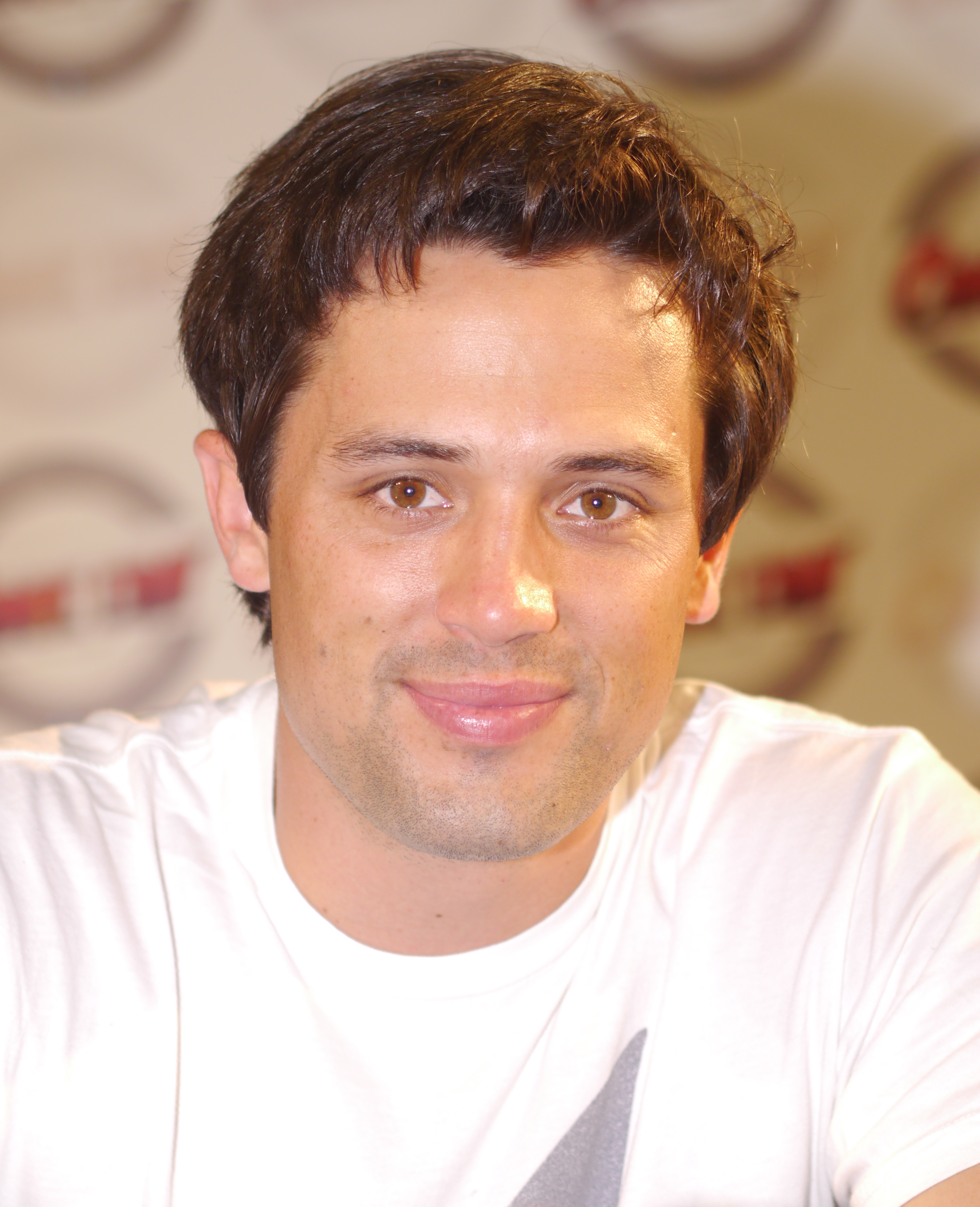
- Stephen Colletti at the 2012 Comic-Con
- Born: February 7, 1986 (age 40); Newport Beach, California, U.S.
- Occupations: Actor; television personality
- Years active: 2004–present
- Spouse: Alex Weaver (m. 2025)
- Children: 1

Stephen August Colletti (born February 7, 1986) is an American actor and television personality. He portrayed Chase Adams on The CW drama series One Tree Hill and appeared for two seasons on the MTV reality television series Laguna Beach: The Real Orange County.

== Early life ==
Colletti was born in Newport Beach, California, the youngest child of Lorilee (née Goodall) and Bruce Colletti. Colletti has an older brother named John and an older sister named Lauren. He graduated from Laguna Beach High School in Laguna Beach, California. He then briefly attended (for a year) San Francisco State University, returning to Los Angeles to pursue an acting career.

== Career ==
In 2004, MTV commissioned a planned reality television series Laguna Beach: The Real Orange County which followed the lives of wealthy teens and Colletti was asked to appear on the show. The series premiered in September 2004. Colletti returned for the second season with the remainder of the cast from the first season. In 2006, the New York Times described his role in the series as "still fighting to acquire some charm to animate his idol looks". Colletti did not return for the show's third season.

In 2008, Colletti appeared as himself in an episode of another MTV Reality Television series The Hills. Colletti had a temporary stint as an MTV VJ, primarily for Total Request Live.

In January 2007, it was announced that Colletti was cast in a major recurring role during the fourth season (Episode 12) of The CW teen drama series One Tree Hill. Colletti portrayed the role of Chase Adams, a high school student who plans to save himself until marriage. Over the course of the following seasons Colletti maintained a major recurring role. In November 2010, Colletti was confirmed to have been upgraded as a core series regular for the series eighth season. In May 2011, The CW renewed the series for its ninth and final season, during which Colletti maintained his regular status. The series finale "One Tree Hill" aired on April 4, 2012.

In February 2009 Colletti portrayed the role of the love interest in the music video "White Horse" by Taylor Swift. Swift says that he was selected for the role because "the guy in the video is supposed to look really sweet and someone who just looks like he would never lie to you."

Colletti and fellow One Tree Hill castmate James Lafferty created and worked on the first season of an original comedy called Everyone Is Doing Great. In August 2018, Colletti and Lafferty reached a crowdfunding campaign goal to fund their first season. On the show, Colletti played the role of Seth Stewart, and served as a writer, producer, and editor. He also directed one episode during the first season. The series made its debut on Hulu in January 2021.

In 2022, Colletti started a podcast with his former Laguna Beach co-star Kristin Cavallari called Back to the Beach with Kristin and Stephen, in collaboration with Dear Media. The podcast revisited the show with behind-the-scenes commentary and special guests.

== Personal life ==
In 2025 Colletti married NASCAR host and Reporter Alex Weaver. Their son, Rhodes August, was born in April 2026.

== Filmography ==
Year	Title	Role	Notes
2005	Cleats of Imminent Doom	Drummer	TV Short
2007	Normal Adolescent Behavior	Robert	
2009	Shannon's Rainbow	Brandon	
2009	Tinslestars	Lou Masters	
2009	What We Became	Daniel Franklin	Short
2010	Kill Katie Malone	Jim	
2010	Maskerade	Evan	
2012	All About Christmas Eve	Darren	TV movie
2014	Status: Unknown	Josh	TV movie
2014	Celluloid Dreams	Young Robert	Short
2015	Summer Forever	Austin Nicholas	Supporting role
2016	The Suicide Note	Adam Bowen	Lead role
2018	The Wedding Do Over	Dan Clark	TV movie
2018	Did I Kill My Mother?	Brody	TV movie
2018	Hometown Christmas	Nick	TV movie
2019	Frat Pack	Brad Schlonghauser	

=== Television ===
Year	Title	Role	Notes
2004–2005	Laguna Beach: The Real Orange County	Himself	Main cast (Seasons 1–2); 27 episodes
2004–2007	Total Request Live	Himself	3 episodes
2006	Celebrity Undercover	Himself	Episode: "Stephen and Tyson's 24 Hour Spring Breakout"
2007–2012	One Tree Hill	Chase Adams	Recurring role (Seasons 4–7); Main cast (Seasons 8–9); 57 episodes
2008	The Hills	Himself	Episode 3.26 "A Date with the Past"
2013–2016	Hit the Floor	Teddy Reynolds	6 episodes
2015	The Eric Andre Show	Himself	Episode 3.10 "Bird Up!"
2021–present	Everyone Is Doing Great	Seth Stewart	Main cast, director, writer, executive producer, editor
2026	The Traitors	Himself	Contestant

=== Music videos ===
Year	Title	Artist	Role
2009	"White Horse"	Taylor Swift	Love interest

== Awards and nominations ==
Year	Award	Category	Production	Result
2005	Teen Choice Awards	Choice TV Reality/Variety Star – Male	Laguna Beach: The Real Orange County	Nominated
