= Wakey Wakey (band) =

- Origin: Richmond, VA
- Genres: Adult alternative
- Years active: 2007–present
- Labels: The End Records, The Family Records
- Website: http://wakeywakeymusic.com/

Wakey Wakey (formerly known as Wakey!Wakey!) is an adult alternative pop group fronted by Michael Grubbs and based in Brooklyn, New York. Michael Grubbs is also known for his role as Grubbs on One Tree Hill, where the band's music has been featured. They reached critical acclaim with their 2010 release, Almost Everything I Wish I'd Said the Last Time I Saw You which reached No. 1 on the Billboard's Heatseekers Chart.

== History ==
Michael Grubbs was born and raised in Richmond, Virginia and began his career as a musician at the age of 5, taking lessons from his mother, a long time piano and choir instructor. Earlier influences included the church music he was forced to practice as rudiments, as well as classical composers such as Brahms, Bach, and Beethoven. As a teenager, Michael discovered the song books of the likes of Billy Joel, Elton John, and Led Zeppelin as a more culturally relevant counterbalance to his classical canon.

Following a few early ventures into performance, Grubbs spent time with two touring musicals - Brigadoon and Camelot - standing out both for his technical ability as well as his exceptional aesthetic.

Grubbs came to New York City in 1998 and soon came to be an understudy of the notable Lach, one of the main proponents and founding fathers of the Anti-folk movement in New York's Lower East Side, from whom he learned to channel energy and inspiration from what he characterized as a repressed background into a style of music that was more accessible to today's audience. As an active member of this movement he came up alongside the likes of Regina Spektor and Moldy Peaches.

His greatest musical break came from meeting Mark Schwahn, critically acclaimed head writer and executive producer of The CW drama series, One Tree Hill. After being introduced to Schwahn and playing for him at an open mic in New York City, Grubb's song "War Sweater", the title track from his War Sweater EP, was featured on the finale of One Tree Hill's sixth season. Following that placement, Schwahn offered to give Grubbs cameos on the show to promote a new record including performances of his songs "Brooklyn", "Light Outside", and "Almost Everything".

Wakey!Wakey! signed with The Family Records, a Manhattan based independent record label, under which they released their full-length debut album Almost Everything I Wish I'd Said the Last Time I Saw You.... The group has since signed with The End Records and released the EP Homeless Poets in 2015 and full-length album Overreactivist in 2016.

== Discography ==
- Silent as a Movie (2007)
- Wakey!Wakey! Wednesdays (2008)
- War Sweater EP (2009)
- Brooklyn/Manhattan (2009)
- Almost Everything I Wish I'd Said the Last Time I Saw You... (2010; used as title of season 7 finale episode of One Tree Hill)
- Dance So Good/Great Lake Love (2010)
- Irresistible EP (2014)
- Salvation (2014)
- Homeless Poets EP (2015)
- Overreactivist (2016)
- Strange is Beautiful EP (2018)
