= James Lafferty =

American actor (born 1985)

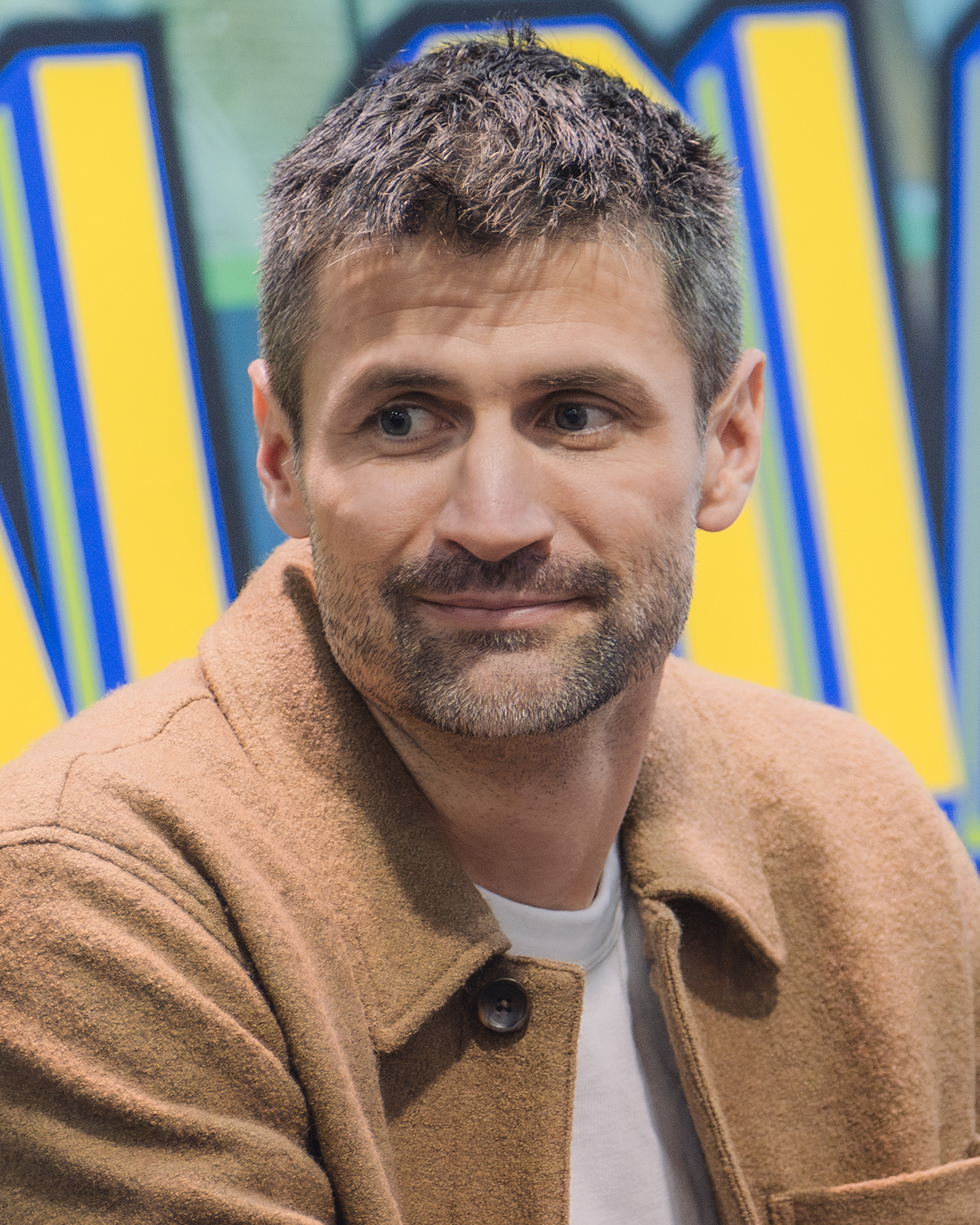
- Lafferty in 2026
- Born: James Martin Lafferty; July 25, 1985 (age 41); Hemet, California, U.S.
- Occupations: Actor; director; producer
- Years active: 1997–present
- Spouse: Alexandra Park (m. 2022)
- Children: 1
- Relatives: Stuart Lafferty (brother)

James Martin Lafferty (born July 25, 1985) is an American actor, director, and producer. He is best known for his portrayal of Nathan Scott on The WB/CW drama series One Tree Hill (2003–2012).

== Early life ==
Lafferty was born in Hemet, California, to Angelica and Jeffrey Lafferty, who own a local construction company. He has a younger brother, actor Stuart Lafferty.

Having worked as an uncredited extra on television shows including Beverly Hills, 90210 and Dr. Quinn, Medicine Woman, Lafferty received his first significant acting role in a school play when he was 10 years old. Lafferty attended Hemet High School (where he played on the school's basketball team) until 2003, after which he enrolled at California State University, Long Beach. At age 18, he moved to Wilmington, North Carolina, having been cast as Nathan Scott in One Tree Hill.

== Career ==
In 1997, at age 12, Lafferty made his small-screen acting debut with a voice-over role in the made-for-television film Annabelle's Wish. Lafferty has since made guest appearances on television series' such as Once and Again, Get Real, and Boston Public. In 2002, Lafferty starred in the ESPN made-for-television film A Season on the Brink, an adaptation of the book of the same name by John Feinstein. The film centered on the 1985–86 season of Indiana University's college basketball team.

In 2003, Lafferty was cast in his breakout role of Nathan Scott on The WB/The CW teen drama series One Tree Hill. The series follows two estranged half-brothers, Nathan and Lucas Scott, who are put on the same basketball team, jeopardizing Nathan's position as the star player. In May 2011, The CW renewed the series for a ninth and final season, for which Lafferty chose to return on a recurring basis rather than in a full-time starring role. Over the course of the later seasons, Lafferty directed four episodes. He received four Teen Choice Award nominations throughout his time on the series.

In February 2008, Lafferty was cast in the straight-to-DVD sequel to the cult film Donnie Darko. Titled S. Darko, the film was released in May 2009, and received mostly negative reviews from critics. In April 2011, Lafferty was confirmed to star alongside One Tree Hill castmate Stephen Colletti and brother Stuart Lafferty in a planned adventurous reality television series entitled Wild Life: A New Generation of Wild, for which he was an executive producer. A pilot episode was filmed, but the series failed to find a network. In 2013, Lafferty was cast in the NBC crime thriller series Crisis, as Mr Nash. This was followed by landing the lead role of Jimmy Adams in the independent movie Waffle Street, alongside Danny Glover, and being cast in a recurring role during the first season of WGN America's slave drama Underground. In August 2015, Lafferty directed an episode of the second season of E! drama series The Royals, and returned to direct a few more episodes during season three. In 2018, James along with costar and friend Stephen Colletti started an indiegogo campaign for their show Everyone Is Doing Great. The show was acquired by Hulu in 2020. Season 1 and 2 of the show aired internationally on Netflix on May 12, 2026. Lafferty’s wife, Alexandra is also in both seasons.

== Personal life ==
Lafferty currently resides in Los Angeles, California. For four years until 2015, he was in a relationship with Irish actress Eve Hewson. He began dating Australian actress Alexandra Park in 2015 after meeting on the set of The Royals, when Lafferty directed several episodes. The couple became engaged on September 7, 2020. They got married on May 23, 2022, in Hawaii. In 2026, Lafferty and Park announced via Instagram the birth of their son, River Jay Lafferty born on December 4, 2025.

== Filmography ==
=== Film ===
Year	Title	Role	Notes
1997	Annabelle's Wish	Buster Holder	Voice
2003	Boys on the Run	Joe Ferguson	
2009	S. Darko	Justin Sparrow	
2011	The Legend of Hell's Gate: An American Conspiracy	Eigson Howard	
2013	Lost on Purpose	Fever	
2014	Oculus	Michael Dumont	
2015	Waffle Street	Jimmy Adams	
2017	Small Town Crime	Tony Lama	
2024	Red Right Hand	Lazarus	

=== Television ===
Year	Title	Role	Notes
1999	Get Real	Billy	Episode: "The Last Weekend"
2001	Emeril	James Lagasse	Episode: "Pilot"
2001	Boston Public	Michael Scott	Episode: "Chapter Eighteen"
2001–2002	Once and Again	Tad	4 episodes
2002	Prep	Jackson	Unsold television pilot
2002	First Monday	Andrew	Episode: "Pilot"
2002	A Season on the Brink	Steve Alford	Television film
2003–2012	One Tree Hill	Nathan Scott	Main role, 182 episodes
2012	One Tree Hill: Always & Forever	Himself	Behind the Scene Extras
2014	Crisis	Mr. Nash	Main role, 13 episodes
2016	Underground	Kyle Risdin	Recurring role, 6 episodes
2018	The Haunting of Hill House	Ryan	4 Episodes
2020	The Right Stuff	Scott Carpenter	Main role
2021–present	Everyone Is Doing Great	Jeremy Davis	Main role
2022	All American	Connor Murphy	Episode: "Got Your Money"
2025	A Pickleball Christmas	Luke Hollis	Television movie (Lifetime)

== Other works ==
Year	Title	Role	Notes
2009–2012	One Tree Hill	Director	4 episodes
2010	Hours Before	Executive producer	Short film
2015–2018	The Royals	Director	5 episodes
2017	Everyone Is Doing Great	Director, executive producer, co-writer	8 episodes
2022–2023	All American	Director	2 episodes

== Awards and nominations ==
Year	Award	Category	Nominated work	Result
2004	Teen Choice Awards	Choice Breakout TV Star – Male	One Tree Hill	Nominated
2005	Teen Choice Awards	Choice TV Chemistry (with Chad Michael Murray)	One Tree Hill	Nominated
2010	Teen Choice Awards	Choice Scene Stealer – Male	One Tree Hill	Nominated
2010	Teen Choice Awards	Choice Parental Unit (with Bethany Joy Lenz)	One Tree Hill	Nominated
