= Jackson Brundage =

American actor (born 2001)

- Born: Jackson Timothy Brundage; January 21, 2001 (age 25); Los Angeles, California, U.S.
- Occupation: Actor
- Years active: 2006–2015

Jackson Timothy Brundage (born January 21, 2001) is an American former child actor. He is best known for his portrayal of Jamie Scott on The CW's One Tree Hill, a role he held from 2007 until the series' conclusion in 2012. Brundage was in the Nick at Nite sitcom, See Dad Run starring Scott Baio which lasted from 2012 to 2015. He was the first voice of Foo in the Nickelodeon series Harvey Beaks before being replaced by Tom Robinson. He has performed in film, television, and voice over. He played Charlie Allan Smith in Lime Salted Love. He also voiced Pablo in Einstein Pals. He retired from acting in 2015.

== Early life ==
Brundage was born in Los Angeles, California. He is the middle child of three and has an older sister named Alexa Jaclyn and a younger brother named Camden Parkor.

== Filmography ==
Film appearances by Jackson Brundage
Year	Title	Role	Notes
2006	Lime Salted Love	Charlie Allan Smith	
2011	Einstein Pals	Pablo (voice)	Video

Television appearances by Jackson Brundage
Year	Title	Role	Notes
2008	Las Vegas	Little Danny	Episode: "Adventures in the Skin Trade"
2008–12	One Tree Hill	Jamie Scott	Main cast
2010	NCIS	Tommy Smith	Episode: "Borderland"
2014	Friends with Better Lives	Brandon	Episode: "Something New"
2012–15	See Dad Run	Joe Hobbs	Main cast
2015	Harvey Beaks	Foo (voice)	Main cast
