= List of One Tree Hill characters =

Five of the original main cast members: top row (L-R) Murray, Burton and Lenz; bottom row (L-R) Bush and Lafferty

One Tree Hill is an American television series created by Mark Schwahn for The WB in 2003. After Season 3, The WB and UPN merged to form The CW, which then became the broadcaster for the show in the United States. Schwahn served as executive producer while also writing and directing for the show, including the premieres and finales of all seasons.

The show began with nine main characters in its first season with the roles of Lucas Scott, Nathan Scott, Haley James, Peyton Sawyer, Brooke Davis, Dan Scott, Karen Roe, Keith Scott, and Whitey Durham. After that, characters from that first season left the show, with new main characters having been both written in and out of the series. Originally, it followed two half-brothers Lucas and Nathan Scott who started out as enemies but later formed a close bond as brothers. It also followed the brothers' various relationships with other female leads during their high-school years and in their early twenties. The series ultimately spanned nearly fifteen years across nine seasons, with various time jumps taken into account.

== Casting ==
Chad Michael Murray was the first person to be cast for One Tree Hill. The producers were originally unsure as to who Murray would play. Series creator Mark Schwahn wanted him to play the character of Nathan Scott since Murray had played a bad guy several times before, he felt it was only natural to give him this role. Murray, however, wanted to portray Lucas due to a connection he felt with the character. He felt that he could inhabit the character as the two share several similarities. Murray's mother left him when he was young, and Lucas was abandoned by his father. Murray's passion for the role led the producers to cast him as Lucas. Murray had turned down the lead role of Ryan Atwood in The O.C. to accept the role of Lucas Scott. James Lafferty was later cast in the role of Nathan as he was a great basketball player.

Hilarie Burton auditioned for the part of Ed Harris's daughter in the film Radio. She was encouraged by subsequent callbacks but did not land the role. However, the casting department remembered her and asked her to send an audition tape for One Tree Hill, and producers promised her a character that she could sink her teeth into – Peyton. "[Burton] is an old soul," said Mark Schwahn, the series' creator. "She's great. She's always just thrilled to do the job, even though she's kind of new to acting. She's just a joy to be around." Burton said, "I've never studied acting or anything because I've been so lucky with MTV. I'm convinced I got the chance to be on One Tree Hill because I did a guest thing on Dawson's Creek as myself, when the cast appeared at the MTV Beach House." She added, "And my only scene was with Chad Michael Murray (Lucas Scott). So, now The Chad and I are reunited. How bizarre is that?"

== Main characters ==
The following is a list of series regulars from One Tree Hill.

Actor	Character	Seasons								
Actor	Character	1	2	3	4	5	6	7	8	9
Chad Michael Murray	Lucas Scott	Main	Main	Main	Main	Main	Main			Special Guest
James Lafferty	Nathan Scott	Main	Main	Main	Main	Main	Main	Main	Main	Main
Hilarie Burton	Peyton Sawyer	Main	Main	Main	Main	Main	Main			
Bethany Joy Lenz	Haley James Scott	Main	Main	Main	Main	Main	Main	Main	Main	Main
Paul Johansson	Dan Scott	Main	Main	Main	Main	Main	Main	Main	Special Guest	Main
Sophia Bush	Brooke Davis	Main	Main	Main	Main	Main	Main	Main	Main	Main
Barry Corbin	Whitey Durham	Main	Main	Main	Main	Special Guest	Special Guest			
Craig Sheffer	Keith Scott	Main	Main	Main	Special Guest					Special Guest
Moira Kelly	Karen Roe	Main	Main	Main	Main	Special Guest	Special Guest			
Barbara Alyn Woods	Deb Scott	Main	Main	Main	Main	Recurring	Main			Special Guest
Lee Norris	Mouth McFadden	Recurring	Recurring	Main	Main	Main	Main	Main	Main	Main
Antwon Tanner	Skills Taylor	Recurring	Recurring	Recurring	Main	Main	Main	Main	Recurring	Recurring
Danneel Harris	Rachel Gatina			Recurring	Main	Guest		Main		
Jackson Brundage	Jamie Scott					Main	Main	Main	Main	Main
Lisa Goldstein	Millicent Huxtable					Recurring	Main	Main	Main	Main
Austin Nichols	Julian Baker						Recurring	Main	Main	Main
Robert Buckley	Clay Evans							Main	Main	Main
Shantel VanSanten	Quinn James							Main	Main	Main
Jana Kramer	Alex Dupre							Main	Main	Main
Stephen Colletti	Chase Adams				Recurring	Guest	Recurring	Recurring	Main	Main
Tyler Hilton	Chris Keller		Recurring	Recurring	Guest					Main

=== Lucas Scott ===
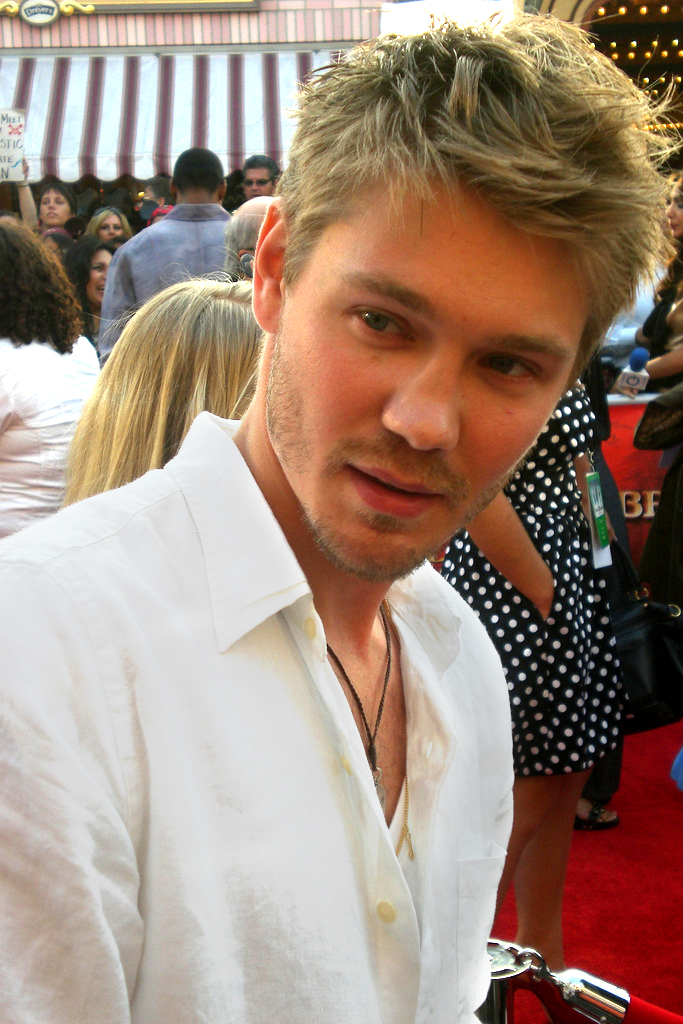
Chad Michael Murray played the central character of the show during the first six Seasons and for one episode in the ninth and final season.

Portrayed by Chad Michael Murray from Season 1 through 6, Lucas Eugene Scott is Haley's best friend and Nathan's half-brother. He was the heart of the show while in Tree Hill. He and Nathan started on bad terms but later become close brothers. He was a star on the high school basketball team, but had to quit after he found out he had a genetic heart problem, inherited from his father, seeing his dream of becoming a professional player vanish, but being able to focus on writing and his second dream: becoming an author. In high school, he was involved in a complicated love triangle with Brooke and Peyton, whom he eventually realized was the one for him all along (although he had actually loved her since childhood). About one year after graduation, Peyton temporarily turned down his marriage proposal because she thought it was too early, causing them to break up. Just over another year later, heartbroken and having lost every hope of getting back together with Peyton after a failed attempt to reconcile with her, he began dating his book editor Lindsey. Then, Peyton's return to Tree Hill made Lindsey realize that Lucas was still and would always be in love with her, no matter what, and that she was just a rebound, prompting her to leave him at the altar after Lucas had ended up proposing to her out of fear of being rejected again by Peyton. Lucas tried to move on, but soon realized that he couldn't keep running away from his true feelings and living miserable, so he finally made amends with Peyton and the two got back together. Then, they became engaged and she moved in with him, leading them to reach an adult and definitive stability, and, after some time, they got married and also had a daughter, whom they called Sawyer Brooke Scott. After her birth, the newborn family left Tree Hill for good. Lucas then returned in Season 9 to help Haley deal with Nathan's disappearance by taking care of his nephew and niece. Lucas is currently travelling with Peyton, Lily, Karen, and Andy while raising Sawyer and writing a new book.

=== Nathan Scott ===
Portrayed by James Lafferty since the pilot, Nathan Royal Scott was a basketball player for the Charlotte Bobcats, husband of Haley James Scott and father of James Lucas Scott and Lydia Bob Scott. He originally started out as a villain and enemy of his brother, Lucas. After falling for Lucas's best friend, Haley, he becomes a better person and later forms a strong bond with his brother. During the course of his life, he has experienced many obstacles including spending time in a wheelchair following an accident after a fight; dealing with an overbearing father; an alcoholic-drug addict mother; and allegations he cheated on Haley. Nathan overcomes all of his problems throughout the series and vows to never raise his child the way Dan raised him. Nathan maintains a strong bond with his mother, who at one point becomes Jamie's nanny. Haley gives birth to Lydia Bob Scott. In Season 9, he is traveling a lot as an agent but when returning to Haley, Jamie and Lydia, he is taken by Eastern European mobsters, with the aid of corrupt policemen, for a failed signing in Europe. The gangsters plan to execute Nathan, but he is rescued by Chris Keller, Dan, and Julian. Dan, however, is critically injured after taking a bullet meant for Nathan. At the hospital, Nathan tells Dan that despite everything he ever did, he is still his father, and he forgives him, with Dan dying shortly after. In the final episode time jump, Nathan is seen with everyone else at Jamie's basketball game who has since broken Nathan's record for all-time scorer.

=== Peyton Sawyer ===
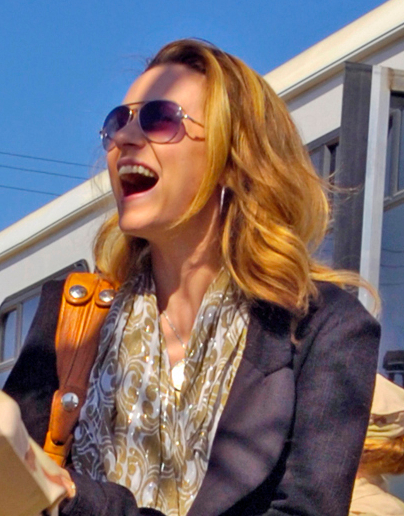
Hilarie Burton portrayed Peyton Elizabeth Sawyer during the first six seasons of the show.

Portrayed by Hilarie Burton from the pilot until the Season 6 finale, Peyton Elizabeth Scott, née Sawyer, was introduced in Season 1 as Nathan Scott's on-and-off girlfriend. She has a huge love for music and art, and frequently sketches certain events in her life, or feelings she cannot bring herself to tell anybody about. In Season 1, Peyton fell in love, reciprocated, with Lucas Scott (who actually loved her since childhood), but frequently tried to bury her feelings since in the meantime he started an on-again, off-again relationship with Brooke, her best friend since childhood, who came between her and Lucas before they had the actual chance to get together. After three seasons stuck in this complicated situation, Peyton eventually decided not to give up on her love for Lucas any more and finally declare her true feelings to him, prompting him to realize she was the one for him all along and ultimately choose her over Brooke in Season 4. Her adoptive mother died in a car accident when she was young, and her adoptive father works at sea, leaving Peyton on her own for most of the first four seasons. She met her birth mother, Ellie Harp, at the end of Season 2; however she died of cancer by the middle of Season 3. Peyton was often surrounded by terrible events: she was shot in the leg during the school shooting in Season 3 and lost a lot of blood, but was rescued by Lucas, and was brutally attacked twice by Ian Banks, who pretended to be her long-lost brother Derek. She was saved the first time by Lucas and her real brother, and the second time by Brooke. Peyton left for Los Angeles to work as an intern at a major record label at the end of Season 4 but did not enjoy herself or feel she was accomplishing anything, so she moved back to Tree Hill in the Season 5 premiere. After her return, Peyton decided to start her own record label, which she named “Red Bedroom Records”. Peyton eventually married Lucas and they had a daughter, Sawyer Brooke Scott, at the end of Season 6. Peyton and Lucas then left Tree Hill to raise Sawyer on the road, alongside Lucas's mother, Karen, her daughter Lily, and her boyfriend, Andy.

=== Haley James Scott ===
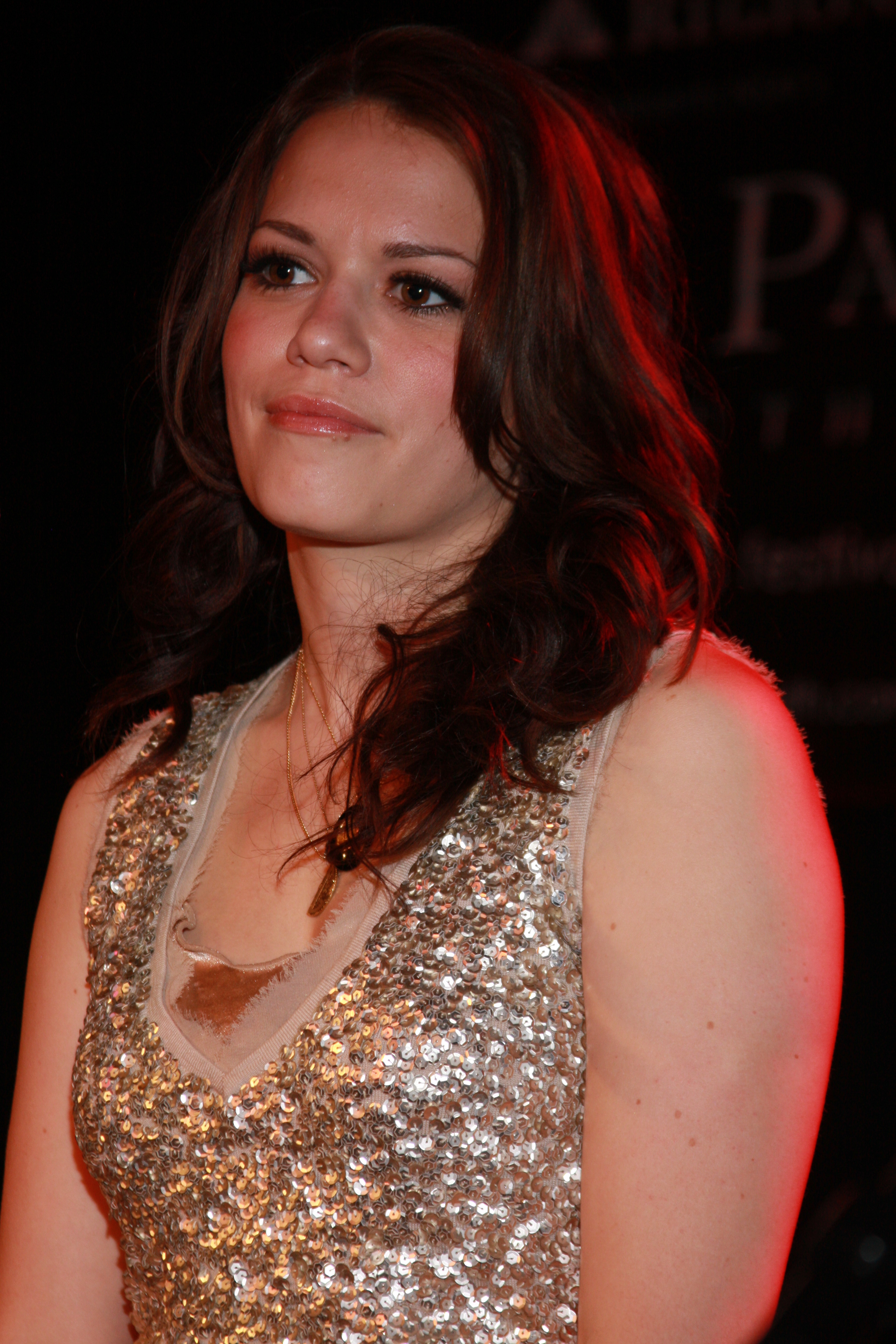
Bethany Joy Lenz portrays Haley James Scott.

Portrayed by Bethany Joy Lenz since the pilot, Haley Bob James Scott is introduced as Lucas Scott's best friend. Although Lucas and Nathan Scott are half brothers and teammates on the basketball team, they do not get along at all and Nathan picks on Lucas incessantly. When Nathan asks Haley to tutor him in school because his low grades are putting him in danger of getting kicked off the basketball team and he hopes to further bother Lucas by hanging out with Lucas' best friend, she initially resists knowing that it would anger Lucas. However, Haley changes her mind and promises Nathan that if he leaves Lucas alone, she will tutor him, and Nathan agrees. When Lucas finds out about this, he is very angry with Haley, until Haley tells him about the deal she made with Nathan. While Haley tutors Nathan, they grow very close and eventually fall in love. Lucas is not initially supportive of the relationship, but as time goes on he forgives Haley, and Lucas and Nathan grow closer as brothers. At the end of the first Season Nathan and Haley decide to get married at the age 16. Early in Season 2, Haley and Nathan begin their married life and Haley starts to pursue music. She is asked to record a song with a man named Chris Keller, and afterwards he offers her the opportunity to go on tour with him. Nathan does not want her to leave so he gives her an ultimatum in which she could either choose him or the tour. Haley is angry at Nathan's ultimatum and leaves to go on the tour. During the tour, Haley and Nathan struggle with their feelings as they both love and miss each other but are also quite angry and hurt. They almost get an annulment, but Haley decides to come back home to Nathan. He eventually forgives her and they rekindle their relationship. Feeling more in love than ever, the couple decides to renew their vows in front of all their friends and family. During their senior year, just as Nathan is offered a scholarship to play for Duke University, Haley informs him that she is pregnant. Although he is initially upset about her not informing him about the pregnancy first, Nathan comes around and the two are quite excited about the pregnancy. They end up having a son named James "Jamie" Lucas Scott. During the four-year time jump between Season 4 and 5, it is revealed that Nathan was a star basketball player was on the verge of becoming a first round pick in the NBA draft. However, on the night before the draft he got into a fight that resulted in temporary paralysis and long-lasting back injuries. Nathan fell into a depression and was quite angry with his circumstances. As the season opens several months after his injuries, Nathan's depression is taking a serious toll on his family. Haley tells him that she cannot stay in their marriage any longer if it continues the way it has been. This wakes Nathan up and he reengages in fatherhood, their marriage, and his life. After struggling through marriage counseling, an obsessed nanny, and Haley's depression after the death of her mother, Haley and Nathan's life and relationship settle down and they have a second child, a daughter named Lydia Bob Scott.

=== Dan Scott ===
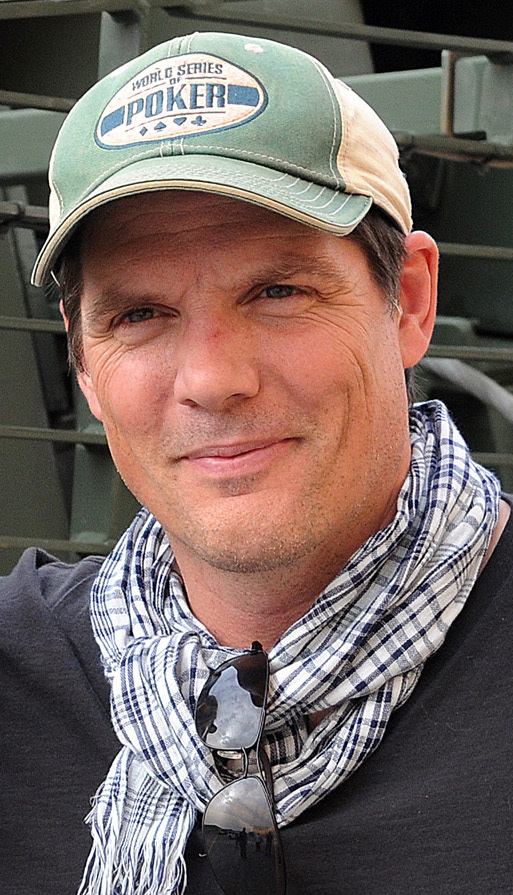
Dan Scott played by Paul Johansson

Daniel Robert "Dan" Scott, also known as Danny, played by Paul Johansson as a series regular from the pilot to Episode 13 of Season 7, as a special guest star for two episodes in Season 8, and in Season 9 until he is killed, is the original villain in Tree Hill. Dan is Deb Lee's ex-husband and Lucas and Nathan Scott's father. Originally wanting nothing to do with Lucas, he begins to want a part in Lucas's life. We find out that not only has Dan been following Lucas all his life, but that he wanted joint custody of Lucas but Karen refused. Lucas later moves in with Dan after learning that he has Dan's heart condition because it is the only way he could afford the medication. When Lucas fails Dan's test, he takes away Lucas's college fund that he had started when Lucas was a baby. He hires a woman (Jules) to make Keith fall in love with her as revenge for sleeping with Deb. Jules actually falls in love with Keith but leaves him on the altar after being threatened by Karen. Deb attempts to murder Dan by burning down his dealership. Dan, thinking it was Keith, shoots Keith and lets Jimmy Edwards take the blame since Jimmy died by suicide. Lucas gradually accepts Dan as his dad until he finds out what he did to Keith. Dan, realizing Nathan will never forgive him, turns himself in to the police. He then spends almost five years in prison and does not get out until Lucas and Lindsey's wedding day.

After prison, Dan becomes close with Nathan's son Jamie. Dan is taken hostage by Carrie, Jamie's ex-nanny who planned to kidnap Jamie and set Dan up for it. He is later rescued by Haley (who went to see him after Carrie called pretending to be a nurse saying Dan was about to die) and Deb (who came afterward to help Haley and Jamie after realizing where Haley had really gone). He shoots Carrie, and she is believed to be dead. When Jamie finds out what he did, he at first stops talking to Dan. Dan leaves Tree Hill to die because he does not think he will be able to find a new heart since one became available while he was being held hostage and he lost out on it. In the year time gap between Seasons 6 and 7, Dan marries Rachel, who takes him to Mexico and illegally buys a heart. After realizing the type of person Rachel is when she wants to take their TV show to the corridor where he murdered Keith, he gives all his money to charity and divorces her. Before leaving Tree Hill once again, he says goodbye to Jamie, who tells him he forgives him. He is seen working in a burger joint, where he is visited by Quinn for help with murdering Katie, but he ends up talking her out of it. He appears shortly in the Season 8 finale when Nathan gives him a photograph of Lydia and a baseball that Jamie hit in a game. Dan returns in Season 9 because he loses everything when his diner burns down. He convinces Haley to let him stay with them for a few days, saying he has nowhere else to go. A flash-forward sequence shows Dan with Chris Keller, burning down a house and apparently ready to kill someone. When Nathan is kidnapped, Haley seeks help from Dan, who promises her that he will do whatever it takes to bring him back home. Eventually, Dan finds him and he ends up taking a bullet meant for Nathan, which critically wounds him. At the hospital, Haley tells Dan that Lucas refuses to come see him. Dan says he is okay with that because he cannot blame Lucas for not being there in his final moments when he was not there for Lucas his whole life. Dan also makes peace with Haley by saying he is glad he was proven wrong about Haley not being good enough for Nathan because she is the best thing that ever happened to him and apologizes for Keith's murder since Keith also meant a lot to her. Haley lets him hold Lydia and tells Dan that whenever Lydia asks about him, she and Nathan will tell her that he loved her and Jamie very much. Dan also makes amends with Deb and lastly, Nathan (in which Dan has a dream that he and Nathan play basketball just for fun for the first time ever), to which Nathan says that despite all the bad he did, he is still his father and forgives him. Dan dies moments later. He is visited by the ghost of Keith, who tells him that he is proud of him for finally learning to put family and friends first and become the brother he always wanted. As the two enter the afterlife, Dan asks Keith, "I know where you're going. But what about me?" Keith answers, "Don't worry, little brother. You're my plus one."

=== Brooke Davis ===
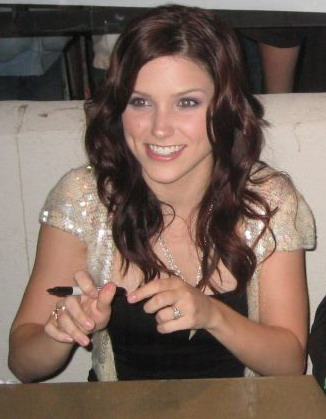
Sophia Bush portrays Brooke Davis.

Portrayed by Sophia Bush since the series' second episode, Brooke Penelope Baker, née Davis, was originally a party girl, who was neglected by her parents. She is first introduced as Peyton Sawyer's promiscuous and messed up best friend, but then forms a close bond also with Haley and the two of them help her to grow into a better person. She goes through an on-again, off-again relationship with Lucas (which is part of a complicated love triangle involving the two of them and Peyton) during the first three seasons, but the two eventually understand they don’t belong together. Lucas then finds his way back to Peyton, his one true love, while Brooke decides to move on and starts focusing on herself. She manages to remain best friends with the two of them as she eventually understands they are meant to be together, but, afraid to open up to love again, she does not really fall for anyone until six years after graduation when she meets the film producer Julian Baker, who eventually becomes her husband. While still in high school, Brooke realizes her passion for clothes design, thus deciding to become a stylist. Brooke also creates her own fashion venture called "Clothes Over Bros", which she then manages to make into a multimillion-dollar corporation thanks to the help and co-leading of her mother Victoria, with whom she has a turbulent relationship: in fact, Brooke is angry at the way her parents ignored her while she was growing up but are interested in her as an adult when she has money and a successful company. Victoria eventually signs 100% of the company over to Brooke, finally realizing she cares more about her daughter than money. She also tells Brooke to go LA and tell Julian she loves him and to not let her inability to open her heart affect her - a trait she got from Victoria, who was also responsible for causing it. Victoria remains working for Brooke's company. Meanwhile, Brooke is devastated to discover she can’t have children. In Season 8, she is almost arrested after Victoria and Millicent began forging documents for the company but Victoria faces the charges and goes to prison instead. Brooke pays all the investors back by selling her company. She later turns down an offer to return as vice president. Then, Brooke and Julian decide to adopt a child, but shortly after, the mother changes her mind and decides to keep the baby, leaving both of them heartbroken. However, Brooke soon discovers that, by some miracle, she got pregnant with twins. Brooke then has an accidental fall, causing her to go into premature labor, but fortunately the twins, Jude and Davis, are fine and Brooke and Julian start raising them and navigating parenthood. Later she forms a true family with both her parents, including her father, Robert Theodore Davis, and starts a new company, Baker Man.

=== Whitey Durham ===
Barry Corbin plays Brian Durham, also known as Whitey, as a series regular in Season 1 through 4, as a guest star for one episode in Season 5 and as a special guest star for one episode in Season 6. Durham was the Tree Hill Ravens basketball coach throughout Season 1 to 4, and also a source of wisdom and advice not only for the students of Tree Hill High, but occasionally the adults living in Tree Hill. He is close to Keith Scott and Karen Roe but has a major rivalry with his former basketball player Dan Scott. Whitey eventually left the Tree Hill Ravens, and during the time period between Season 4 and 5, he coached a college basketball team, before finally retiring, leaving the college team for Lucas to coach. In Season 6, now retired, he is visited by Dan, who finally apologizes, and they have a reconciliation where Whitey tells Dan that he still has time to earn his family's forgiveness.

=== Keith Scott ===
Played by Craig Sheffer as a series regular for Seasons 1 through 3 and as a special guest star in two episodes in Season 4 and one episode in Season 9, Keith Alan Scott is Dan Scott's older brother, as well as a recurring love interest for Karen Roe, Lucas Scott's mother and Dan's ex. Keith was portrayed as Lucas's father figure and was dearly loved by most characters in the show. He was a mechanic and spent a lot of time teaching Lucas about cars. Keith was in love with Karen from their schooldays and despised the way his younger brother Dan had treated her when she became pregnant and had his son. After Dan and Deb split up for a short time, Keith ended up sleeping with Deb. Dan was angry when he found out and accused Keith of always wanting his leftovers. In revenge, Dan hired Jules to make Keith fall in love with her and to stand him up at the altar. Instead, she actually falls in love with Keith but leaves when Karen finds out about Dan's plan and tells her to leave Tree Hill, or she would tell Keith the truth. In Season 3, Dan shoots and kills Keith because he believes Keith had attempted to murder him in the dealership fire. After he is killed by Dan, Karen finds out that she is pregnant with his daughter Lily Roe Scott. Following his death, Keith continued to have a lasting influence on Tree Hill and the lives of those who lived there. His ghost visits Lucas during his near death, Karen while she is giving birth, and Dan while he is in prison. Many years later, after Dan is shot and killed upon rescuing Nathan, Keith's ghost returns to praise Dan for learning to put family first. They make amends, and they both go to the afterlife, with Keith telling Dan he is his "plus one".

=== Karen Roe ===
Played by Moira Kelly as a series regular from Seasons 1 through 4 and as a special guest star in Seasons 5 and 6, Karen Roe is the single mother of Lucas Scott. She has a very fraught relationship with Lucas's father, Dan Scott, because Dan had left her and Lucas to attend college. Lucas finds out that Karen lied to him when Dan tells him that he wanted joint custody of him and Karen refused. She is a businesswoman and owned Karen's Cafe and TRIC nightclub, the venue where both Lucas and Nathan had their wedding receptions. She is seen as a mother figure to Haley, often offering her support and advice. After the breakup of Dan and Deb's marriage, Karen and Deb become good friends and end up going into business together. However, their partnership later ends due to Deb's drug addiction and when she accidentally shoots a gun off in the customer-filled cafe. When Brooke moves in with her and Lucas, she also becomes a mother figure for her and somebody Brooke looks up to. After years, she admits her feelings for Keith and decides to marry him, but he is murdered by Dan before the ceremony. It is later revealed that she is pregnant with Keith's child and has a daughter, Lily Roe Scott. She later sells the cafe and goes traveling the world with her boyfriend and later husband, Andy. Eventually, she is also joined by Lucas, Peyton, and their daughter Sawyer, and they travel with them. In the final episode, Haley convinces Karen to sell TRIC to Chase.

=== Deb Scott ===
Barbara Alyn Woods portrays Deborah "Deb" Lee, previously Scott, as a series regular from Season 1 through 4 and in Season 6, and as a recurring character Seasons 1, 5, and 9. She is Dan Scott's ex-wife and Nathan's mother. She becomes good friends with Dan's ex and Lucas's mother, Karen, and they go into business together. She battles alcohol and drug problems in Season 2 and sets fire to Dan's car lot hoping he would die, but Lucas drags him to safety. She again battles drugs in Season 4, so Dan and Karen set up an intervention, but Deb turns it down and storms out. In Season 5, however, she cleans up her act and becomes Jamie's nanny. She meets a man on the internet who turns out to be her son's friend "Skills" and begins a relationship. Deb later ends it as she believes he should have children and get married which she does not want to do again. In her final episodes, Dan tells her it is as much her fault Keith died as his because he thought it was Keith who set fire to the car lot, which is why he killed him, which again leaves Deb filled with guilt. However, in Deb's last scene, Dan tells her to not blame herself and to not feel guilty because it is not her fault. Following this, Deb falls off the canvas, only to return to Tree Hill a few years later upon Nathan going missing. During her return, she consoles Haley and confronts Dan once he is hospitalized upon rescuing Nathan. Deb is able to find closure with Dan before his death.

=== Mouth McFadden ===
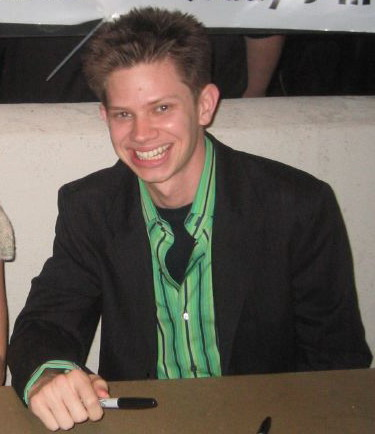
Lee Norris portrays Mouth McFadden.

Marvin McFadden, also known as Mouth, is portrayed by Lee Norris. He is Lucas's friend from the River Court. Originally a recurring character during Season 1 and 2, he was upgraded to series regular status from Season 3. He becomes close friends with Brooke and Rachel. Mouth is the only one who knows it was Rachel who released the time capsule which caused the events leading up to Keith's death. He at first stops speaking to her but forgives her in the end. Four years later; Mouth falls in love with Millicent, Brooke's assistant. After the pressures of the modelling industry cause her to worry about her weight she begins to take drugs and rejects all her friends, including Mouth. When Skills leaves for a new job in Season 7, Mouth begins to date Lauren, which ends his friendship with Skills when he finds out. Skills later forgives Mouth. Despite Lauren wanting to continue their relationship, Mouth refused as his friendship to Skills meant more to him. Since Lucas left Tree Hill, Mouth and Nathan have become close friends. Mouth lost his job because he refused to speak on air about Nathan's scandal. At the beginning of Season 8, Mouth and Millicent sleep together after getting drunk together at a bar discussing their problems and why they broke up. During Season 8, he and Millicent get a job as hosts of a talk show. In Season 9, Mouth goes through a transformation by gaining around 50 pounds for his food reviews. In the final episode, Mouth receives $500,000 from Dan. Mouth uses this to create a sporting scholarship in memory of Jimmy Edwards and Keith Scott. Also in the final episode, in the time jump, Millicent and Mouth are expecting a baby and both are wearing rings on their ring fingers, indicating that they are married.

=== Skills Taylor ===
Portrayed by Antwon Tanner as a series regular from Season 4 to Episode 13 of Season 7 and in a recurring role in Season 1 through 3 and Episode 18 of Season 7 onwards, Antwon Taylor, also known as Skills, is one of Lucas's best friends from the River Court, who later becomes good friends with Nathan too. He begins to date Bevin (Bevin Prince), a cheerleader, but their relationship ended sometime in the time-jump between Season 4 and 5, leading Skills to tell Jamie that relationships with women named Bevin end badly. He meets someone else online, who turns out to be Nathan's mother, Deb. After initially saying nothing can happen, they sleep together and start a relationship. Deb later ends the relationship feeling he can do better and deserves to have children and get married, which she does not want to do again. He then starts dating Jamie's teacher, Lauren. He moves to Los Angeles to start a new job but comes back as he cannot get over Lauren. Skills finds out Lauren and Mouth started dating while he was away but later forgives Mouth. In Season 9, Skills sees Lauren again and sees that she is pregnant, and thinks that the baby is his, but it is not; the baby is David's (Quinn's ex-husband). In the series finale time jump, he is shown to apparently be in a relationship with Bevin again.

=== Rachel Gatina ===
Played by Danneel Harris as a series regular in Season 4, along with a recurring role during Season 3, 5 and 7, Rachel Virginia Gatina was introduced as a bad girl and rival to Brooke Davis, before becoming good friends with Brooke and a friend to Mouth. In Season 3 she began dating her current boyfriend Cooper Lee. She was originally obese before undergoing plastic surgery treatments to alter her appearance before moving to Tree Hill. In Season 4 she tries to break up Nathan and Haley but fails which causes Haley to confront her. In the time gap between Season 4 and 5, she worked for Brooke's company "Clothes Over Bros" and began using drugs which forced Brooke to let her go. However, after finding her lying unconscious from an overdose in her private New York apartment, Brooke decides to bring her back to Tree Hill to look after her. Rachel then (after being taunted by Victoria that she will never really recover from her addiction and is kidding herself) steals Brooke's money and leaves. In Season 7, she returns and is married to Dan Scott and is the mastermind behind his Redemption TV series. She suggests they film a scene in the hallway where Dan murdered Keith, which disgusts him. After realizing the sort of person she is, Dan gives all his money to charity and divorces her, leaving Rachel with nothing.

=== Jamie Scott ===
Played by Jackson Brundage since Season 5, James Lucas Scott, known as Jamie, is Nathan and Haley's four-year-old son. He gets his middle name from his uncle and godfather, Lucas Scott. Brooke Davis is Jamie's godmother, and they spend much of their time together, and Brooke always gives Jamie a check with "a lot of zeroes" each year on his birthday (it is Jamie's favorite present). Jamie is often a shoulder to lean on for many of the characters and is shown to be very intelligent and cute. He forms a close bond with his grandfather, Dan Scott, since he feels everyone deserves a friend. After Dan reveals to him he is the person who killed his great Uncle Keith, Jamie feels lost. Lucas takes him to the auto shop where he grew up to tell him about his great Uncle Keith. Jamie later forgives Dan. Jamie is shown to be a good basketball player and has a strong friendship with Skills and Marvin. Jamie is very fond of both Brooke and Julian, serving as best man at their wedding. He has had a very big interest in playing baseball, which grew after Julian gave Jamie a glove once worn by Roberto Clemente and he met ace pitching prospect Ian Kellerman. He misses his uncle Lucas greatly and mentions this to his father often. In Season 8, he gets braces for his teeth and has a growing attraction for female classmate Madison, allowing her to win the school spelling bee. He also helps his father study for his college course. In Season 8 he becomes a big brother to Lydia Bob Scott. He is seen to love his baby sister. In Season 9, after Nathan goes missing, Jamie fears that he will never see him again and repeatedly watches the last video Nathan had sent to him before disappearing. When Lucas returns to Tree Hill, Jamie and Lydia leave with their Uncle Luke allowing Haley to relieve some stress as she awaits word on Nathan. He and Lydia return after Nathan is rescued, and Jamie is able to say goodbye to Dan before he dies. In the series finale, Haley shows Jamie the box of predictions she and Lucas used to do, and Jamie makes a prediction that he will beat Nathan's score record. In the time jump, Jamie is now a teenager and has become the new leading scorer, beating Nathan's record and wears the number #12 because it is his favorite number.

=== Millicent Huxtable ===
Recurring in Season 5 and starring from Season 6 onwards, Millicent "Millie" Huxtable, played by Lisa Goldstein, is Brooke's friend and originally her assistant. She began a serious relationship with Mouth after moving to Tree Hill with Brooke to open a store for "Clothes Over Bros". In Season 7 after modelling for Brooke, she becomes a full-time model and the face of "Clothes Over Bros". This causes her to worry about her weight. As the pressure became too much, she started using cocaine with her new modelling friends. She became a shadow of her former self rejecting Mouth's love and Brooke's friendship. After help from Victoria and Alex, she gets her life back on track and moves back to New York to resume her position as vice president of the company. She assisted Victoria in forging documents for "Clothes Over Bros", causing Brooke to be arrested when it all came out. Brooke says to her "the old Millie would have never done this." She later falls into bed with Mouth after a drunken night and after a while they get back together. After "Clothes Over Bros" closes, she gets a job as a news reporter. At the end of Season 8, she and Mouth get their own talk show. Millie is tempted to become the co-host in a bigger market show but decides to stay with Mouth. At the start of Season 9, she is concerned over the fact that thanks to all their cooking segments, Mouth has gained about 50 pounds. In the final episode, in the time jump, Millicent and Mouth are expecting a baby and she is wearing a ring on her ring finger, meaning that she and Mouth are married.

=== Julian Baker ===
Played by Austin Nichols in a recurring note during Season 6 and as a regular from Season 7 onwards, Julian Andrew Baker is a movie producer and director. He has gone through life feeling as though he is never good enough as his father had never shown him that he is proud of his achievements. When he first appears he begins a relationship with Peyton when she has broken up with Lucas. After he realizes she will never get over Lucas, he leaves her. Some time after, he heads to Tree Hill to produce a movie version of Lucas's book. At first it seemed like he just wanted Peyton back, but later falls for Brooke as he feels a connection with her as they share a similar past both as footnotes in the Lucas/Peyton love story. In Season 7, Julian catches Alex Dupre's eye, a model and actress hired by Brooke for "Clothes Over Bros". Brooke becomes very jealous of the friendship between the two and they break up for a while. After getting back together, the gang take a trip to Utah where Julian proposes to Brooke. She says yes. In Season 8, he marries Brooke. Julian and Brooke decide that they want to start a family, so they explore adopting. They meet a nineteen-year-old girl named Chloe. Chloe then decides to give her baby to Brooke and Julian, but once she reconciles with her ex-boyfriend, she decides to keep the baby, leaving Julian and Brooke heartbroken. A few weeks later Brooke and Julian decide to move to New York until she discovers they are expecting a baby and decide to stay in Tree Hill. The couple then found out they were expecting twins and after a fall while working they were delivered at seven months and put in a special care unit. At the end of Season 8, Julian and Brooke are seen playing at home with their sons, whom they named Jude and Davis. In Season 9, Julian accidentally leaves Davis in the car on a hot day and feels extremely guilty for almost killing his son. He carries the guilt around until Brooke forgives him, which allows him to eventually forgive himself. Julian plays a big part in saving Nathan, helping Dan find and rescue him. Julian also helps Brooke deal with Xavier coming back.

=== Clay Evans ===
Played by Robert Buckley from Season 7 onwards, Clayton "Clay" Evans became Nathan's agent and close friend during the time jump of fourteen months between Season 6 and 7. He is also close to Nathan's family, his wife Haley James Scott and their son James Lucas Scott. At first Clay is shown as a flirt and fond of one-night stands. Upon meeting Quinn James, Haley's sister, he is immediately drawn to her but backs off once he learns that she is going through a separation with her husband. In his past, Clay was married to a woman named Sara who died suddenly, leaving Clay emotionally scarred and unable to let go of her. Clay is a loyal friend and helps the Scotts through the Renee scandal but is fired once he fails to re-sign Nathan with the Bobcats. Quinn helps him get his job back and make peace with the loss of his wife so he can move on and the two fall in love. In the Season 7 finale, both he and Quinn are shot by Clay's stalker, Katie Ryan and left for dead. Clay lingers between life and death with a gunshot wound to the chest and comes close to dying when his organs start to fail but makes a miraculous recovery after a kidney transplant and awakens with Quinn at his side. He later helps Nathan with a career as a sporting agent. We later find out that Clay in fact fathered a baby with Sara named Logan, who he later meets in a hospital while undergoing counseling for his disease. In the penultimate episode of Season 9, Clay proposes to Quinn in Logan's tent, which is set up in the living room. Quinn says yes. In the final episode, Clay and Quinn get married and adopt Logan.

=== Quinn James ===
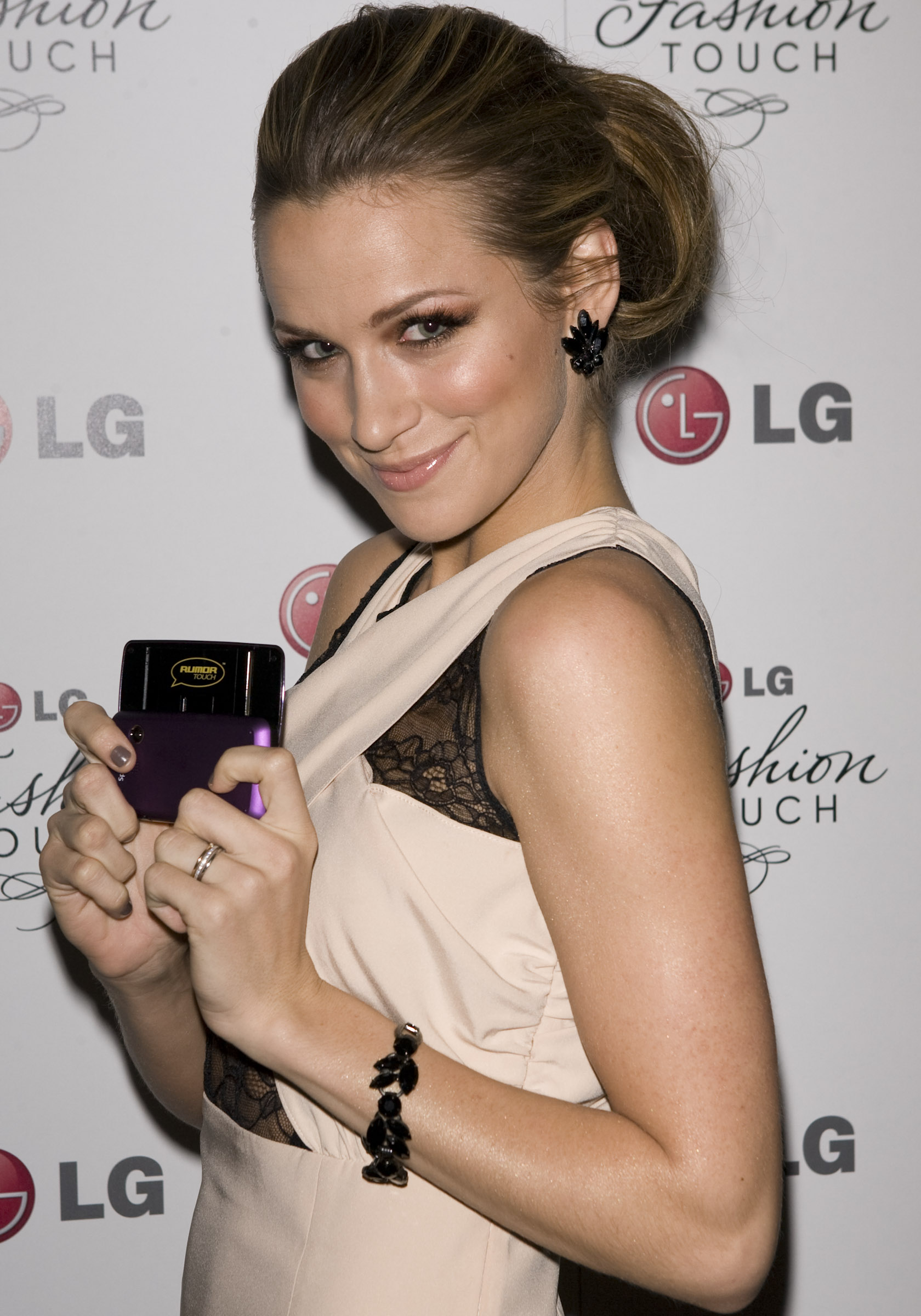
Shantel VanSanten joined the cast in Season 7 as Haley's sister, Quinn.

Played by Shantel VanSanten since Season 7, Quinn A. Evans, (née James, previously Fletcher) is a photographer and the oldest of the James sisters who moves back to Tree Hill after her marriage breaks down. She feels that her husband has begun to change and that they no longer have anything in common and later divorces him. She begins a relationship with Nathan's agent Clay. Her younger sister, Taylor, returns to Tree Hill with Quinn's former husband, causing a fight between the sisters. They later make things right before their mother dies of cancer.

Quinn was the first one to be shot by Katie Ryan when she was heading to bed. She and Clay are in limbo while fighting for their lives. Clay tells her that she has to wake up because she is needed, especially by Haley. They confess their love for each other ("Til kingdom come") before Quinn wakes up and makes a full recovery, but fears for Clay when Haley tells her that his organs are failing. She visits Clay every day and he awakens with her by his side. Once they return home, Quinn is still haunted by the attack from Katie and keeps a gun hidden. When Clay finds it, he tells her that she should go to Africa for a photography gig because that will save her. She does and when she returns, it is revealed that part of her trip had been spent tracking down Katie as she has numerous photographs of her. She then visits Dan for help in killing her but backs out at the last minute. Katie, however, initiates an attack on Quinn when Clay is out of town but this time it is Quinn who shoots Katie. In Season 8, she goes to Brooke's bachelorette party and ends up, after a drunken night, with a tongue piercing, raw meat in her purse and a stolen skateboarding dog. In Season 9, Quinn helps Clay with his mental problems and supports Haley when Nathan goes missing. She is quite jarred when Clay reveals he had fathered a son named Logan whose existence he had blocked out of his mind after Sara's death.

In the penultimate episode of Season 9, Clay proposes to Quinn in Logan's tent, set up in the living room. Quinn says yes. In the final episode, Quinn and Clay get married and adopt Logan.

=== Alex Dupre ===
Portrayed by Jana Kramer since Season 7, Alex Dupre, real name Alice Whitehead, was originally a recurring character, but was moved to starring in Episode 14. She is a fallen starlet whom Millicent hires to be the face of Clothes Over Bros' new line. At first, everyone thinks she is a ditzy and promiscuous girl. She later tries to have Julian produce a movie she scripted (although she at first does not disclose that she wrote it) and butts head with Brooke who sees her as a potential rival for Julian's attention. She almost ruins her chances of working with Julian by making a move on him, but they later reconcile and begin to write a script for a movie. She also jump-starts Millicent's modeling career by drugging another model, leaving Millie to take her spot. She is fired by Brooke when it is revealed she exposed herself to Julian in her hotel room. Later on, Alex and Millie become quite close, and Alex also tries to become close to Julian. When Julian refuses to be with her, she attempts suicide by slitting her wrists. She was hospitalized, and in a coma for a while, but she survives. Eventually, she takes her own place in the Tree Hill crowd, and everyone accepts her. Whilst at the film festival to promote the film she made with Julian, she begins to develop a crush on Chase, who had just broken up with Mia. On the last night, they kiss and then sleep with each other. In the Season 8 premiere, they have become a couple and Alex flaunts this in front of Mia while Chase teaches her how to bartend. Chase breaks up with her after she lies to him about a new movie project. Alex and Mia later fight over Chase before it is revealed that he wants to be by himself now. After "inviting herself" to Brooke's bachelorette party, while they are all partying and drunk, Alex becomes included within the girls' group. At the end of the episode, she says to Quinn that even though the gang does not like her, she likes them and enjoys spending time with real friends — even though she is not their friend. Quinn then tells her that she considers Alex a friend.

=== Chase Adams ===
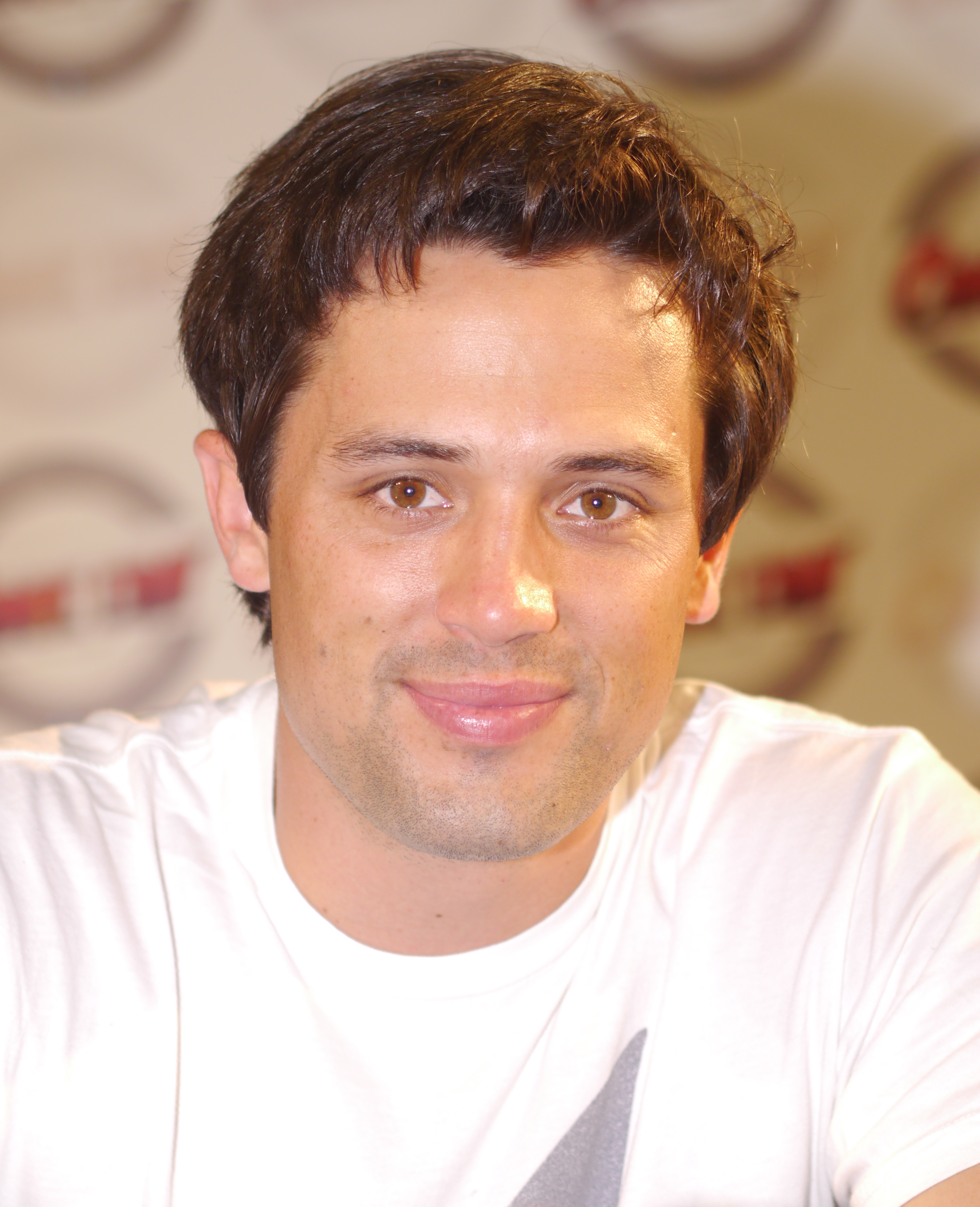
Stephen Colletti portrays Chase Adams.

Stephen Colletti portrayed Chase Adams in a recurring role from Season 4 through 8, before being upgraded to a regular from the Episode 11 of Season 8. He was another member of the Clean Teens who got close to Brooke after she and Rachel joined the Clean Teens. Brooke, after earning a high grade in a test by cheating, agreed to tutor Chase, who initially had no idea of how Brooke really got the grade, and they begin to date. When he found out that Brooke cheated, he forgave her, and they continued to date. Brooke and Chase attended a party at Nathan's mom's house, and everyone found out that Nathan and Brooke filmed a sex tape. He visited Brooke while she was setting up for the prom and told her that his ex-girlfriend cheated on him with his best friend. He told her that it is over between them, but he knows how important the prom is to her so they will still go together. Brooke told him it is over because she did not want to be with someone who does not want to be with her. Chase later bumped into Brooke at school; he had been calling her after he heard about her being tied up by psycho Derek. He was no longer wearing his "Clean Teens" T-shirt and it is revealed that he still has feelings for Brooke, as she does for him. After a heartfelt confession, Chase and Brooke decided to get back together. In the finale, Brooke and Chase took their relationship to the next level and had sex in the backseat of his car. Chase said "it was the best 60 seconds" of his life. Four years later, he was friends with Owen and came back to Tree Hill for Lucas' bachelor party (before his wedding with Lindsay), unwittingly getting set up with Peyton, which they used to make Lucas and Brooke jealous. Chase told Brooke that Owen was not returning to Tree Hill, marking the end to Owen and Brooke's relationship. Chase returns to Tree Hill to discover Owen has slipped back into his previous ways and offers to take over his job working at TRIC until Owen regains sobriety. Chase then asks Mia out on a date, which ends with them having their first kiss in Peyton's studio. He was also the inspiration for Mia's new song for her second album. In the Season 7 finale Alex asks him out on a date and kisses him just before he receives a text message from Mia wanting to get back together. Since they came back from Utah, he is now dating Alex. In Season 8, Episode 5, he breaks up with Alex because she lied to him about a new movie project. Alex and Mia then fight over Chase, before it is revealed that because of their decisions he no longer wants to be with either and is instead choosing to be by himself. At Brooke and Julian's wedding, he has "slutty wedding sex" with Mia. He then realizes he wants to be more than just a bar manager at TRIC after having a conversation with Mia the day after the wedding, and becomes a "Big Brother" to Chuck, one of Jamie's friends. In Season 9, Chase becomes friends with Chris Keller. He is also closer to Chuck and when Chuck's violent dad returns, Chase beats him with a crowbar to protect Chuck and is arrested, resulting in him being discharged from the Air Force. In the season finale, Chase is promoted from bar manager to bar owner of TRIC.

=== Chris Keller ===
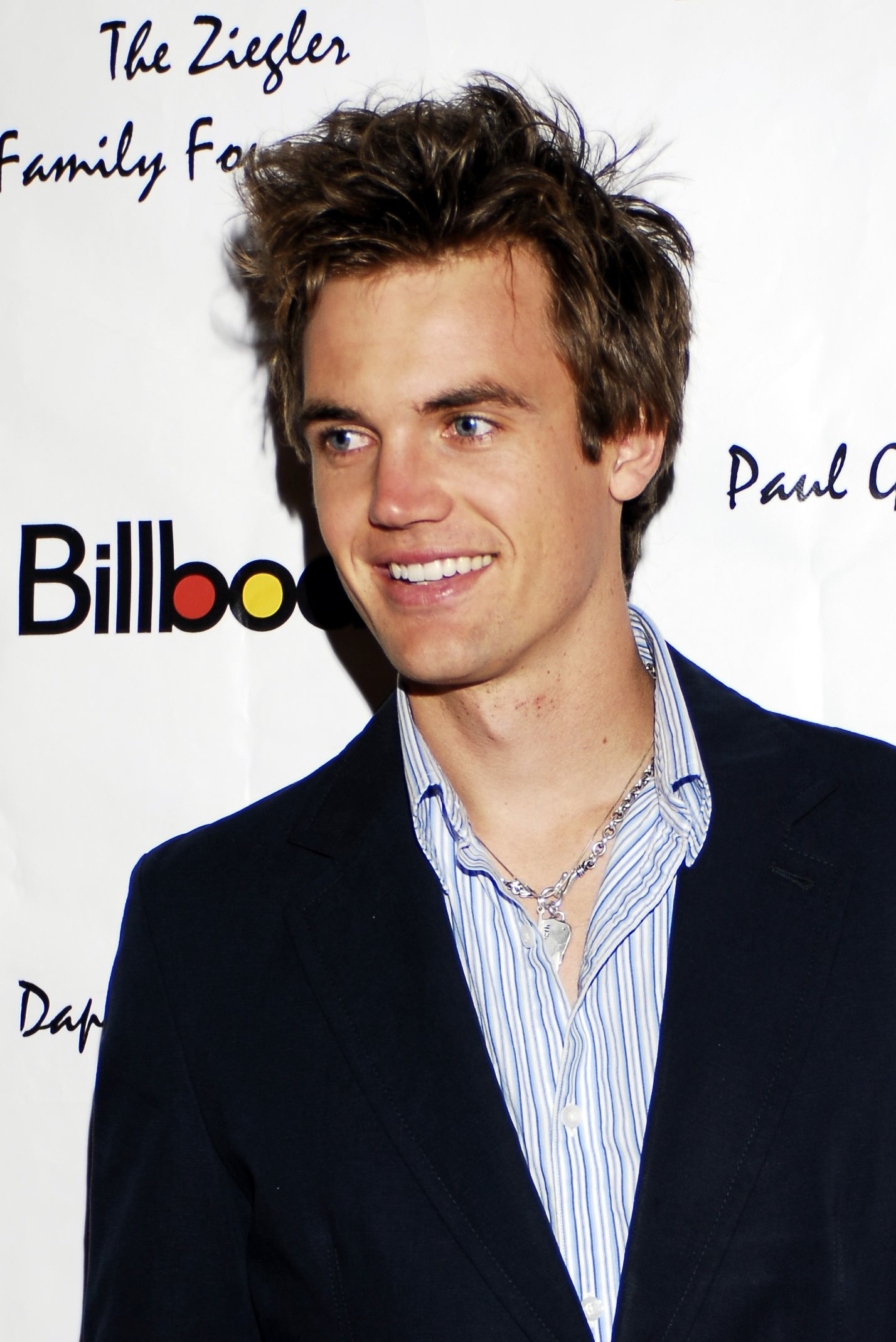
Tyler Hilton prepared for the role by purchasing the show's first season on DVD.

Chris Keller is portrayed by Tyler Hilton in a recurring role during Season 2, 3, and 4 and as a series regular in Season 9. He is introduced when Peyton asks to put up a flyer in the record shop which he works at. Chris is talented but also very egotistical to the point of referring to himself in the third person. He later shows up for the auditions to perform at TRIC. With Peyton being impressed by his audition, he agrees to perform, however leaves the stage with the intention that Haley would have to perform in his absence. Impressed by Haley's talent he invites her to share some studio time, and the two record a cover to Ryan Adams' When the Stars Go Blue. Upon finding out that the two worked together, Nathan threatens Chris warning him not to take advantage of her. He later kisses Haley and invites her to join him on tour, which she initially accepts however backs out last minute. He returns to Tree Hill whilst touring and convinces Haley to join him on tour.

He returns in Season 3 when Nathan asks him to help Haley with her song writing. Following getting drunk with Brooke, the two sleep together, causing problems in her relationship with Lucas. With no money to pay for Haley's music masters from the studio, he and Nathan play poker to gain money. However, the two become stranded with no money, leading Chris to sell his guitar to pay the studio. He then leaves Tree Hill on good terms with Nathan. He later appears while the gang are in Honeygrove rescuing Mouth.

"Being such an opposite of him and coming into contact with people like that, I know what it's like to hate those kinds of people, I know what those people do to make me hate them and that's what I try to do as Chris"
— Tyler Hilton on his portrayal of Chris Keller.

In Season 9, Chris returns, having used an alias to trick Haley into hiring him as a new partner at the recording studio. He annoys Alex by telling her latest song is not good but convinces her to help him make it better. He still refers to himself in the third person and believes both Haley and Alex are attracted to him despite their denials. Chris helps Dan save Nathan by causing a distraction and killing one of the guards, allowing Julian to go home (but Julian stays). Chris runs away after killing the guard, leaving Dan (and Julian) doing everything else. He returns after months on the run, convinced the gang who kidnapped Nathan is after him and jarred to discover no one even noticed he was gone.

In the series finale, Nathan gives Chris the guitar he had sold years ago to pay for Haley's record as a thank you for his part in the rescue mission, with the two on much better terms. Chris performs at TRIC's ten-year anniversary where he impresses a record executive named Frankie Parks but turns down the offer to sign to her label. Haley approaches him and offers him the chance to sign to Red Bedroom Records as their newest artist.

Tyler Hilton was awarded the role for playing his song Glad with Mark Schwahn seeing that he was right for the part by the first chorus. Hilton watched the show's first season to know more about it, having never seen an episode. Hilton enjoys being able to play his music live on the show as music is such a large part of One Tree Hill. Schwahn notes that the audience initially thought the character was there for Peyton, and were praising him for his confidence; however, when they learned he was there for Haley to break up her marriage, they began hating him.

== Recurring characters ==
The following is a list of characters that are, or at one time were, a recurring guest on the series; they are listed in the order that they first appeared on the show. Many characters have had storylines that have spanned multiple seasons, while the others are restricted to arcs that occurred during a single season of the show.

Actor	Character	Seasons								
Actor	Character	1	2	3	4	5	6	7	8	9
Bryan Greenberg	Jake Jagielski	Recurring	Recurring	Recurring						
Brett Claywell	Tim Smith	Recurring	Recurring	Recurring		Guest				
Cullen Moss	Junk Moretti	Recurring	Recurring	Recurring	Recurring	Recurring	Recurring	Recurring	Recurring	Guest
Vaughn Wilson	Fergie Thompson	Recurring	Recurring	Recurring	Recurring	Recurring	Recurring	Recurring	Guest	Guest
Bevin Prince	Bevin Mirskey	Recurring	Recurring	Recurring	Recurring	Guest				Guest
Sarah Edwards	Theresa Edwards	Recurring	Guest							
Thomas Ian Griffith	Larry Sawyer	Recurring								
Kevin Kilner	Larry Sawyer			Recurring						
Emmanuelle Vaugier	Nicki	Recurring	Recurring							
Shawn Shepard	Principal Turner	Recurring	Recurring	Recurring	Recurring	Guest				
Bess Armstrong	Lydia James		Recurring					Recurring		
Katherine Bailess	Erica Marsh		Recurring							
Michael Copon	Felix Taggaro		Recurring							
Daniella Alonso	Anna Taggaro		Recurring							
Kieren Hutchison	Andy Hargrove		Recurring			Recurring				
Maria Menounos	Emily Chambers (Jules)		Recurring							
William Haze	Rick		Recurring							
Lindsey McKeon	Taylor James		Recurring					Recurring		
Michael Trucco	Cooper Lee		Guest	Recurring	Recurring					
Sheryl Lee	Ellie Harp		Guest	Recurring						
Pete Wentz	Pete Wentz			Recurring						
Kelsey Chow	Gigi Silveri			Recurring	Recurring		Recurring			
Allison Scagliotti	Abigail "Abby" Brown			Guest	Recurring					
Amber Wallace	Glenda Farrell			Guest	Recurring					
Rick Fox	Daunte Jones				Recurring					
Matt Barr	Ian Banks (Derek)				Recurring					
Ernest Waddell	Derek Sommers				Recurring		Recurring			
Elisabeth Harnois	Shelley Simon				Recurring					
Daphne Zuniga	Victoria Davis					Recurring	Recurring	Recurring	Recurring	Recurring
Kate Voegele	Mia Catalano					Recurring	Recurring	Recurring	Recurring	
Michaela McManus	Lindsey Strauss					Recurring	Recurring			
Robbie Jones	Quentin Fields					Recurring	Recurring			
Torrey DeVitto	Nanny Carrie					Recurring	Recurring			
Kevin Federline	Jason Federline					Recurring				
Joe Manganiello	Owen Morello					Recurring	Recurring	Guest		
Bradley Evans	Jerry					Recurring	Recurring	Recurring	Guest	Recurring
Kelly Collins Lintz	Alice Day					Recurring				
Ashley Rickards	Sam Walker						Recurring			
Susan Walters	Principal Rimkus						Recurring			
Burgess Jenkins	Bobby Irons						Recurring			
James Van Der Beek	Adam Reese						Recurring			
John Doe	Mick Wolf						Recurring			
Evan Peters	Jack Daniels						Recurring			
Devin McGee	Xavier Daniels						Recurring			Recurring
Katherine Landry	Madison						Recurring	Recurring	Recurring	Recurring
Michael May	Chuck Scolnik						Recurring	Recurring	Recurring	Recurring
Kelley Davis	Mrs Scolnik						Guest	Guest	Recurring	Recurring
Allison Munn	Ms. Lauren						Recurring	Recurring	Recurring	Recurring
Gregory Harrison	Paul Norris						Recurring	Recurring	Guest	
Jaden Harmon	Andre Fields						Recurring	Recurring		
Mitch Ryan	Alexander Coin							Recurring		
Michael Grubbs	Mike Grubbs							Recurring		
Paul Teal	Josh Avery							Recurring		
Kate French	Renee Richardson							Recurring		
India de Beaufort	Miranda Stone							Recurring		
Andrea Moore	Makenna Gage							Recurring		
Sasha Jackson	Kylie Frost							Recurring	Guest	Guest
Amanda Schull	Sara Evans							Recurring	Guest	Guest
Amanda Schull	Katie Ryan							Recurring	Recurring	
Scott Holroyd	David Lee Fletcher							Recurring		Guest
Sharon Lawrence	Sylvia Baker								Recurring	
Laura Izibor	Erin Macree								Recurring	
Leven Rambin	Chloe Hall								Recurring	
Peter Riegert	Dr. August Kellerman								Recurring	
Eric McIntire	Ian Kellerman								Recurring	
Pierce Gagnon	Logan Evans									Recurring
David Norona	Dr. Alvarez									Recurring
Richard Burgi	Ted Davis									Recurring
Chelsea Kane	Tara Richards									Recurring
Manu Intiraymi	Billy									Recurring

=== Jake Jagielski ===
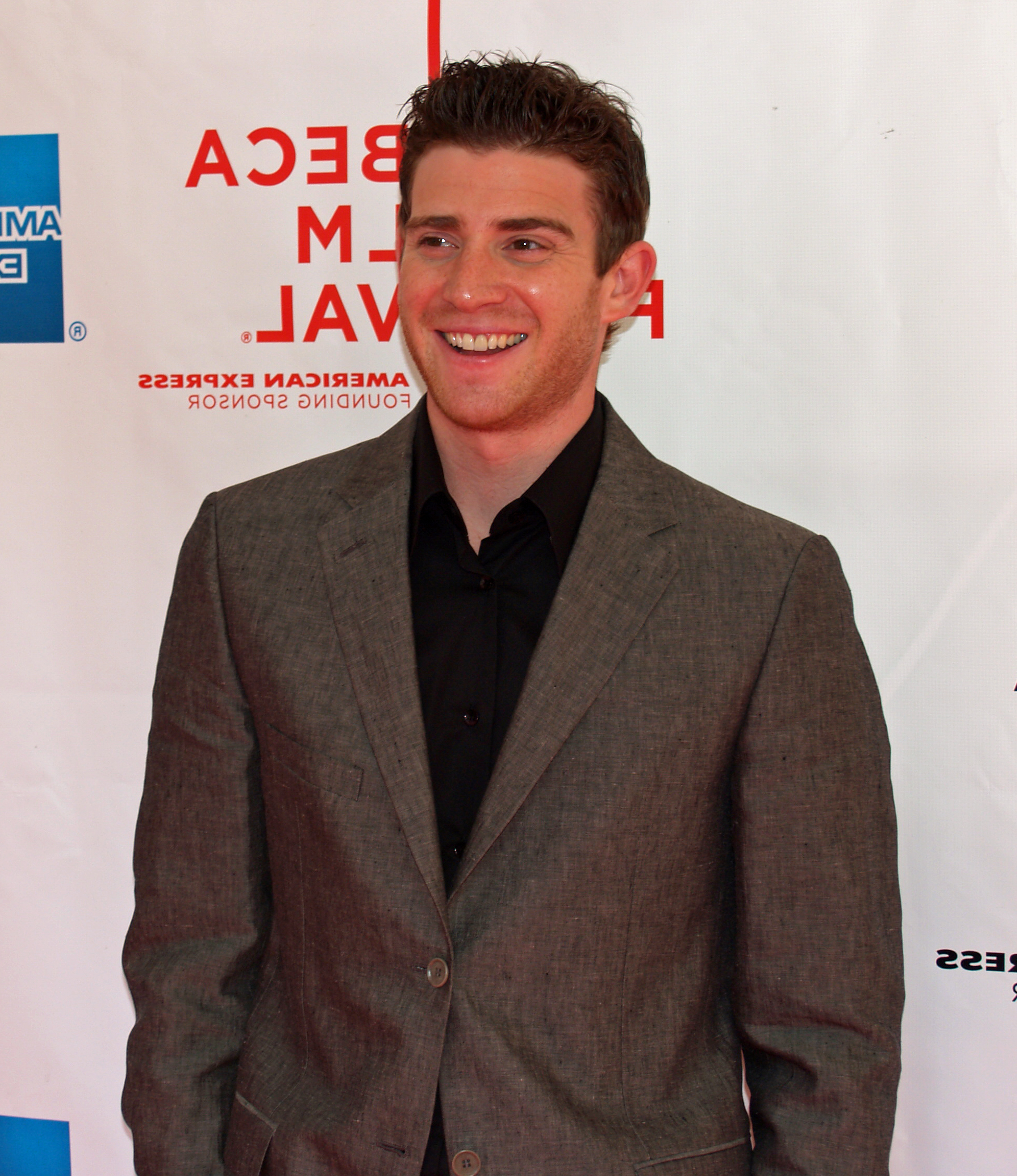
Bryan Greenberg portrays Jake Jagielski through the show's first three seasons, becoming a love interest for Peyton.

Played by Bryan Greenberg. Jake was introduced in Season 1 as one of Lucas' teammates and a teenager dad of his baby daughter Jenny. He was forced to leave Tree Hill with Peyton's help not after the baby’s mother Nicki shows up in Tree Hill. In Season 2, Peyton developed romantic feelings for him and begins emailing him with no response. Jake returns to Tree Hill when he receives a telephone call from Lucas that Peyton is struggling. The two then take a road trip together to collect Jenny from Savannah, Georgia. He and Peyton share their first date upon their return, and later begin a relationship. Then Nicki returns, having been awarded full custody of her daughter, due to Jake not being present at the hearing. He initially hides himself and Jenny from the police, but later turns himself in, with Whitey taking his daughter to Florida. Nicki, however, finds Jenny and leaves town with her, causing Jake to decide to leave Tree Hill and a heartbroken Peyton again to find his daughter. In Season 3, Peyton visits him in Savannah where he and Nicki are awaiting trial to determine who will receive custody. Peyton wants to stay and asks him to marry her, but soon after Peyton says that she loves Lucas in her sleep, prompting Jake to tell her that she needs to come back home and clear her mind about who she truly loves, then she can eventually return. Peyton does as Jake asked, but her leaving marks the end of their relationship for good because, once back in Tree Hill, she realizes that Lucas is the one for her. The role of Jake Jagielski was written specifically for Bryan Greenberg, having previously worked with series creator Mark Schwahn on The Perfect Score. Plans for the character to return in Season 2 were helped by the audience responding well to the character. Schwahn expressed interest in having the character return. He has approached Greenberg about reprising his role, but noted that Greenberg's busy schedule was likely to prevent any further appearances.

=== Tim Smith ===
Played by Brett Claywell. Tim was Nathan's best friend until Nathan married Haley. He then clung on to Nathan and had a hard time adjusting to the fact that Nathan had new friends outside of him, especially Lucas. His appearances slowly turned to comic-relief such as when he mistook a pair of female police officers for strippers at a party, insisting on them giving him a show even as they handcuffed him and put him in a police car. He then attended a school for "slower students". In Season 5, he is now working as a delivery boy for a pizza place, is married to Bevin, and they have a son named Nathan, as learned when he gets locked in the library with Haley, Peyton, Brooke, Mia, and Lindsey. At the end of the episode, it turns out that he knew how to get out all along but did not say anything because he enjoyed hanging out with everyone again and says that no one really keeps in touch anymore. In the series finale, Bevin reveals that she is divorced due to her extreme hatred for Tim, indicating an unhappy and short marriage between the two.

=== Junk Moretti ===
Played by Cullen Moss since the pilot, Jonathan Moretti, also known as Junk, is one of the players from the River Court. He once said he had a Canadian girlfriend. Following the four-year gap, he lived with Mouth, Skills, Fergie and, later, Millicent.

=== Fergie Thompson ===
Played by Vaughn Wilson since the pilot, Ferguson "Fergie" Thompson is another one of the players from the River Court. He attended the Prom by himself. He is usually seen with Skills and Junk. After the four-year gap he lived with Mouth, Skills, Junk and, later, Millicent.

=== Bevin Mirskey ===
Played by Bevin Prince during Season 1 through 5, Bevin Evan Mirskey (formerly Smith), in over thirty episodes spanning the first five seasons. Originally intended as an extra in cheerleading scenes, Prince was later given lines to speak. Her friendship with Brooke is established in Season 2 when Bevin expresses that she is a great captain. Bevin dates Skills in Season 3 and 4, but they break up during the missing years. She is not very bright, but she reveals in Season 4 that she only acts dumb so others can feel better about themselves. In Season 5, we see that she is married to Tim Smith, who is also not smart, and they have a son named Nathan. Bevin does not make another appearance until the series finale, when Clay and Quinn go to confirm the adoption of Clay's son, Logan. It is revealed that she now works as a social worker and that she is apparently divorced from Tim, stating that she "hated her husband." In the final scene of the series, where everyone is at Jamie's high school basketball game, it is revealed that she is back together with Skills.

=== Larry Sawyer ===
Played by Thomas Ian Griffith in Season 1 and Kevin Kilner in Season 3, Larry Sawyer is the adoptive father of Peyton Sawyer who raised her alone after the death of his wife Anna. He is often away because of his work but he and Peyton maintain a close relationship and talk frequently. He is very over-protective of his daughter and, to an extent, Brooke as well. He first meets Lucas in his house holding a rake and threatening him, but Larry comes around and grows fond of Lucas, especially after he saved Peyton's life during the school shooting. Larry also is attracted to Karen for a time, but it fades when she meets Andy.

=== Nicki ===
Emmanuelle Vaugier played Nicki during Season 1 and 2. She first appeared as a girl who had a one-night stand with Lucas. She wanted to get involved in her daughter's life, but Jake would not let her. She told him that she would get to Jenny with or without him. She tried to use Brooke to find out where he was but was fooled into going to Seattle while he was actually in Savannah. She returned in Season 2, saying she had earned custody of Jenny through a trial which Jake did not attend because he was in hiding. When Jake refused to give Jenny to her and turned himself in to the police because there was a warrant out for his arrest, she still managed to locate her and take her away. Jake then chased after her and in Season 3, it is revealed that they both live in Savannah and will continue to share custody until the next trial.

=== Lydia James ===
Played by Bess Armstrong during Season 2 and 7. Lydia James, née Brigard, is the matriarch of the James family and the mother of Haley, Quinn, Taylor, Vivian and three older boys. She fully supported Haley's decision to marry during her junior year, opposing the views of Nathan's mother Deb but it was a decision she made because her children's happiness is very important to her. In Season 7, Lydia visits her daughters, Haley, Taylor and Quinn and it is revealed that her husband had died several years prior and that she has Pancreatic Cancer and is dying but wants to spend her remaining time with daughters rather than fight it. This causes Taylor to leave. She also rents a photography studio for Quinn, encouraging her to chase her dreams. Lydia's condition worsened and she was hospitalized. Quinn talked to Taylor, asking her to visit their mother and Taylor eventually did. Taylor eventually apologized for her behavior and Lydia then told her that out of all of her kids, Taylor reminded her the most of a younger version of herself. Haley, Nathan, Quinn, Taylor, Jamie and Clay then stayed with Lydia and she eventually died. She was cremated and her ashes were scattered by Haley, Quinn & Taylor. Haley named her daughter after her in Season 8.

=== Felix Taggaro ===
Played by Michael Copon during Season 2, Felix Taggaro is Anna's brother and dated Brooke Davis. He was Lucas's new rival because of those two facts, and they never saw eye-to-eye. He painted "dyke" on Peyton's locker to protect his bisexual sister from what he believed to only be rumors. Brooke dumped him when she found out about the locker, and he was later sent to military school. He also betrayed his own sister after she came out to him.

=== Andy Hargrove ===
Played by Kieren Hutchison during Seasons 2 and 5, Andy Hargrove is a teacher at Karen's college who happens to be extremely wealthy since he had quite a successful CEO job after a car accident with a woman, which worked as a wake-up call. The two began dating but after his mother became ill, he returned to New Zealand. He is a suspect in the attempted murder of Dan. Karen visits him, but they break up because she does not want to have more children. They get back together sometime during the time jump, and he returns with Karen for Lucas's wedding.

Karen and Andy are now married and traveling the world while raising Karen's daughter, Lily.

=== Anna Taggaro ===
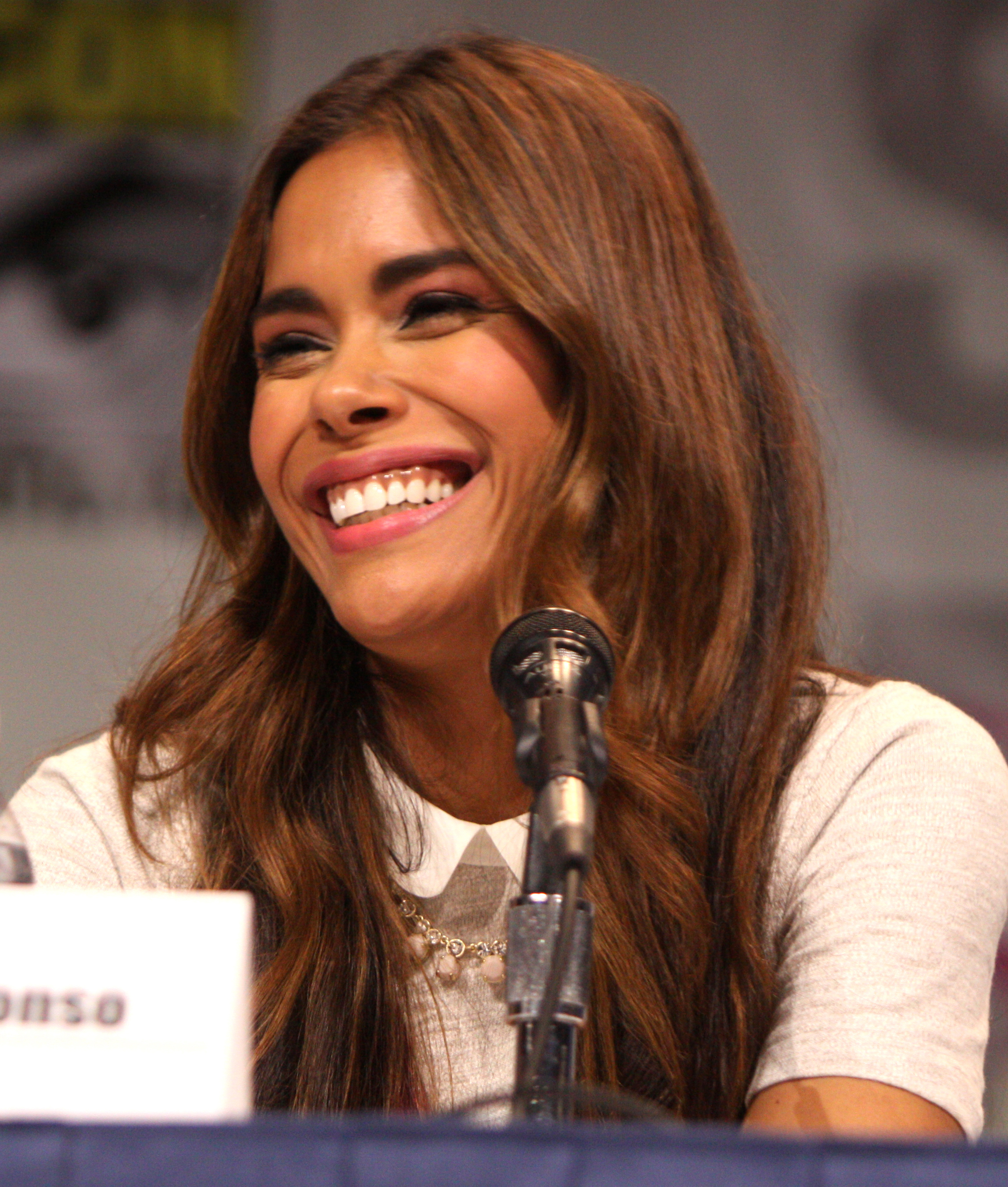
Daniella Alonso portrays Anna Taggaro, a bisexual character.

Portrayed by Daniella Alonso, Anna Taggaro appeared in eleven episodes of Season 2. The character is credited by AfterEllen.com as the first recurring bisexual character of color on television, though whether the character is "truly bisexual" or simply gay is debated by fans. Anna moves to Tree Hill to escape rumors that she has been having a relationship with another girl. She is first introduced in Season 2 "I Will Dare", when she helps Lucas escape the security guards at the local mall. The two then go to a pizzeria together. She and Lucas watch a meteor shower which her brother Felix disapproves of. They decide to take things slow becoming "friends with potential"; however, she offers him sex after a formal dance, which he turns down due to not being in love with her. Lucas ends the relationship after realizing that he has feelings for Brooke, however the two remain friends as she confides her sexuality to him. Anna forms a strong relationship with Peyton and kisses her after misreading the signs. When she discovers that Felix wrote 'dyke' on Peyton's locker, she turns him in, getting him expelled. She comes out to him and states how hurt she is by his use of the word. Anna decides that she should stop running from who she is and comes out to her parents, and eventually leaves Tree Hill to re-join her previous school.

"Her use of the word 'gay' instead of 'bisexual' wasn't meant to imply that Anna is not bisexual. If I had known the word bisexual was more taboo, we may have gone in that direction. For me, it seemed like Felix was so homophobic, that for her to say 'I'm gay' to him felt even stronger for her."
— Mark Schwahn on the decision for the character to come out using the word 'gay'.

When creating characters for Season 2, Schwahn had wanted to add a family, which the addition of Anna and Felix allowed him to do. While casting Daniella Alonso, he refrained from telling her that the rumors regarding Anna's sexuality were true; however, once he informed her of her character's back story, it was like "flipping a switch" for Alonso, as she knew what to play. The character was made bisexual as opposed to a lesbian so that her past could be kept secret. Anna was presented as a romantic interest for Lucas; "[Schwahn] thought if she was strictly a lesbian character, that would be really out of nature for her, and a little disingenuous to lesbians", and they needed to hide what her journey was going to be. Alonso feels that the audience was not receptive to the character initially—especially with a large portion of the audience wanting Brooke and Lucas to be together—however over the course of her arc they began to accept Anna.

=== Emily Chambers ===
Emily Chambers, who pretended to be Jules, was portrayed by Maria Menounos during Season 2. She is a woman who Dan paid to make Keith fall in love with her and then break his heart, as way to get revenge on him for sleeping with Deb. She took the "job" to pay for hospital bills she had from being regularly beaten up by her boyfriend. She actually does fall in love with Keith but leaves on their wedding day after Karen blackmails her.

=== Taylor James ===
Lindsey McKeon portrays Taylor James during Season 2 and 7. Taylor is Haley and Quinn's sister. She comes to Tree Hill in Season 2 and stays in Nathan and Haley's apartment. It is revealed that Nathan lost his virginity to Taylor. When Haley is constantly absent because of her music career, Taylor is stirring up trouble with Nathan. Taylor takes him to a bar, where she dances with other women on the table. Nothing happens though, and Nathan returns to Tree Hill. She returns in Season 7, episode thirteen with Quinn's ex-husband David, who she is dating. She, along with Haley and Quinn are visited by their mother, Lydia, who reveals that she has pancreatic cancer and is dying. When Lydia tells the girls that she does not want to spend the remainder of her life in a hospital, Taylor gets angry and believes her mother is giving up. Haley later finds her packing and despite her attempts to persuade Taylor to stay, Taylor leaves. When Lydia collapses and ends up in the hospital, Quinn comes to try to convince her to come see their mother, but Taylor angrily refuses in tears, but Quinn leaves a picture of her, Taylor and Haley when they were close as kids and Taylor ends up going to the hospital to see Lydia. Taylor is told by Lydia that out of all her children she reminds Lydia the most of a younger version of herself. She, Quinn, Haley, Nathan, Jamie and Clay are present when Lydia dies and she along with her sisters, scatter her ashes.

=== Cooper Lee ===
Played by Michael Trucco during Season 2, 3, and 4, Cooper Lee is Nathan Scott's uncle and Deb Lee's brother. He first came to town to cheer-up Nathan after his break-up with Haley. He then comes back to protect Deb from Dan and dates Rachel Gatina. He tried to end it when he found out she was seventeen. The two then drove off a bridge but survived. Cooper moved back home.

=== Ellie Harp ===
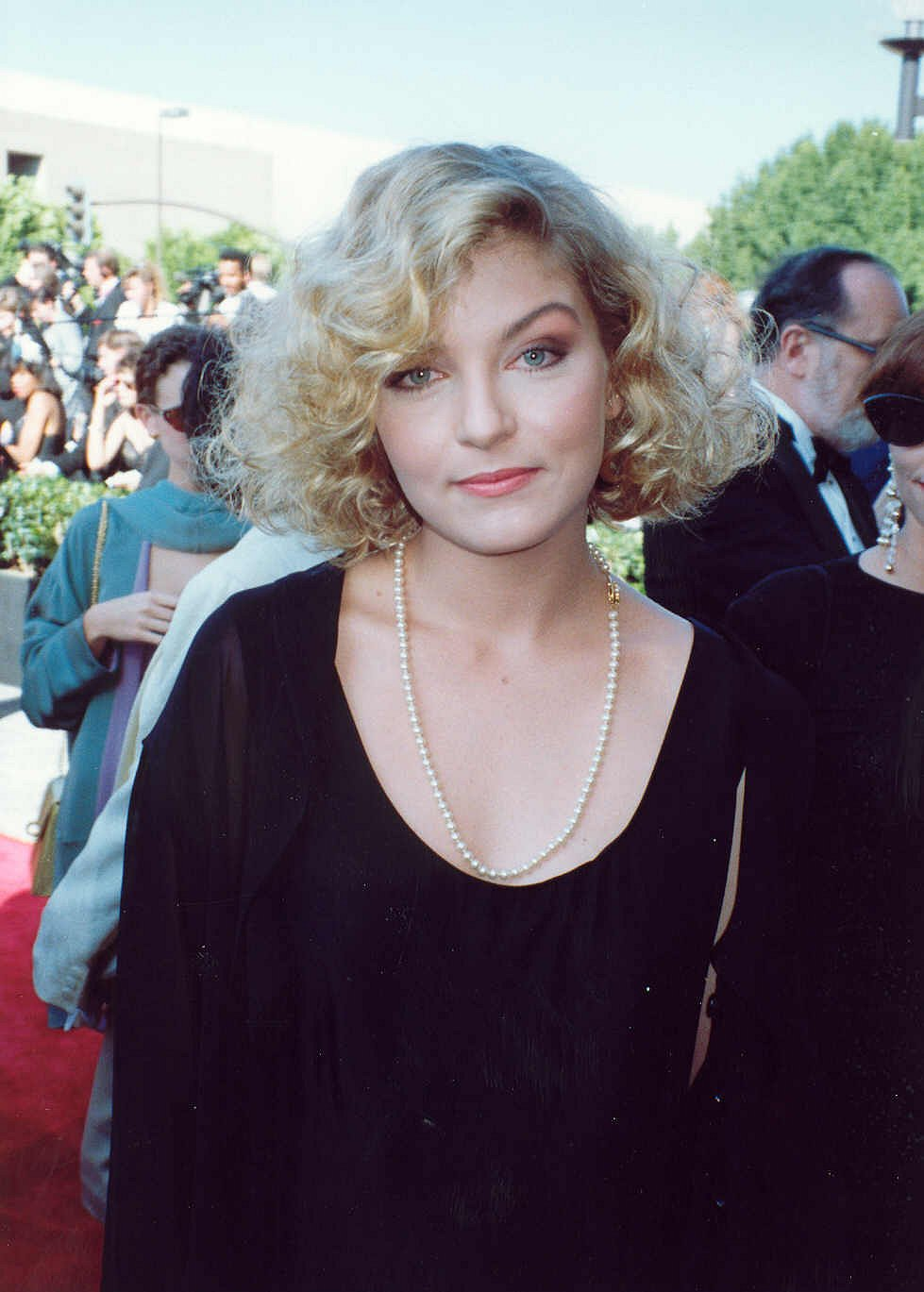
Lee played Peyton's biological mother who died from breast cancer shortly after coming into Peyton's life.

Portrayed by Sheryl Lee in the Season 2 finale and Season 3. Elizabeth "Ellie" Harp was a cocaine addict when she got pregnant with Peyton and decided to give her up; Peyton was adopted by Anna and Larry Sawyer. She agreed not to have any contact with her daughter, but she later decided she wanted to see her and finally managed to at the end of Season 2. Ellie is a writer and pretends to be doing a magazine article on Peyton so they can meet up. When Peyton calls the magazine, they tell her there is no-one called Ellie Harp working there, and they know nothing about the article. Peyton begins getting creepy emails from "WATCHMEWATCHU" and assumes they are from Ellie. Ellie shows up on Peyton's door and tells her that she is her mother, and she did not send any emails. At first, Peyton did not believe her or trust her, especially after Lucas Scott caught her buying drugs. However, it was revealed that she was dealing with a recurrence of breast cancer, and that the pills were actually for medical purposes. Peyton was about to change her mind after finding out about Ellie's condition, but they fought again when Peyton found that she wrote an article about her. She told her to go away, calling her a liar. Haunted by dreams about her "Angel of Death" persona, Peyton found Ellie again and they bonded. They decided to make a CD to promote Haley's new song and raise funds to fight breast cancer. They finally managed to finish the CD, but Ellie died the day the records were ready. Peyton spread her ashes on a place where Ellie had been to a music festival, the best thing she remembered aside from her time with Peyton. Years after Ellie's death, Peyton meets her biological father who is named Mick Wolf.

=== Gigi Silveri ===
Kelsey Chow portrayed Gigi Silveri in Season 3, 4, and 6. In Season 3 Gigi joined Mouth as an announcer on ravenshoop.com and they had a short relationship. In Season 6, Gigi returned as Mouth's intern, causing trouble in his relationship with Millicent.

=== Ian Banks ===
Ian Banks (Psycho Derek), portrayed by Matt Barr in Season 4, was Peyton's online stalker, and had an obsession with her. Ian pretended to be Peyton's brother Derek in order to get close to her, but when she found out the truth about him he attempted to rape her and was stopped by Lucas and the real Derek. After that, Peyton believed Ian to be in prison but on prom night she and Brooke Davis were held hostage by him and attacked. The two managed to fight him off and he is put in the hospital, and then finally sent to prison.

=== Derek Sommers ===
Played by Ernest Waddell during Season 4 and 6. Derek Sommers is the biological half-brother of Peyton. Lucas is startled to discover that Peyton's brother was black, but ultimately this was not much of a discussion point. He rescues Peyton and Lucas from Psycho Derek. While Psycho Derek escaped from Peyton's house, Peyton did not feel safe anymore and closed herself up in the house. Derek returns and teaches her kickboxing to help her deal with her anger. The lessons were successful, when Psycho Derek returned Peyton uses the lessons to beat Psycho Derek. This may have attributed to getting Psycho Derek in jail. Peyton goes with Derek to the Raven's basketball banquet, where he meets her friends. The same night, Derek had orders to ship out to Iraq. Peyton meets up with him several times after that. When he comes back from Iraq he is honored with a medal and Peyton attends the function. He tells her how their dad, Mick, never did the USO concert he promised to do. Peyton organizes a USO concert for him and his fellow servicemen as a thank you gift, and to show that she is his family, and she will always be there for him.

=== Glenda Farrell ===
Played by Amber Wallace in Season 3 and 4, is a former Tree Hill High student and a confidant of Lucas Scott who he befriended in his senior year after he was paired with her during a class assignment designed to help students know each other beyond simple high school labels. She is the first to read Lucas' final draft of his first novel, An Unkindness of Ravens.

=== Victoria Davis ===
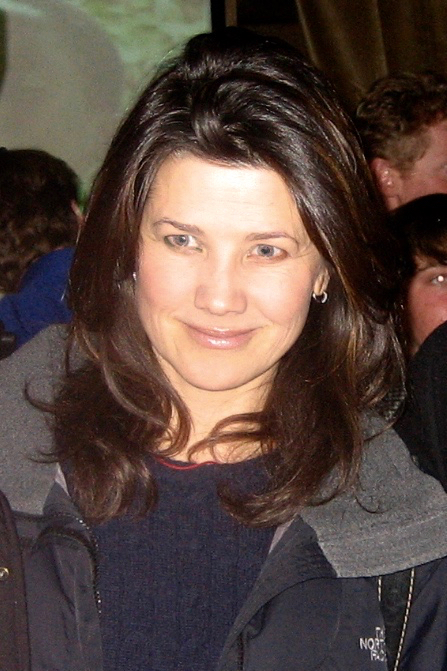
Daphne Zuniga has played the role of Victoria Davis since the series' fifth Season.

Played by Daphne Zuniga since Season 5, Victoria Anne Davis, née Montgomery, is married to Robert Theodore Davis and is the mother of Brooke Davis. She is the former CEO of Clothes Over Bros. She moved from LA because her husband moved around a lot. Brooke felt that they were hiding the fact that it was a trial separation. She came up with many ideas to take Clothes over Bros. to the next level including introducing a formal line and a magazine called b. Davis. She misinterpreted Lucas showing Brooke an engagement ring, as the two getting engaged and told Brooke that she would have annulment papers drawn up fast. She felt that Brooke should be focusing on the company and not 'boys with rings,' and reminded her that the company is called Clothes over Bros. Brooke told Victoria that she was ready to take the company to the next level and Victoria replied that they were going to have everything that they ever wanted. She told Brooke that she would like her to call her Victoria, because 'Mom' makes her sound too old. Later on she tried to control Brooke's decision over COB's future as the CEO of the brand (the opening of the Tree Hill boutique and Peyton's label) but ended up alienating her daughter by repeatedly rejecting her. Brooke fired her mother after she went behind her back to scare Rachel off. At the beginning of Season 6 she returned to inform Brooke that she is part owner of Clothes Over Bros and although Brooke protested, she informed her that designers come and go, but the CEO remains the same. She threatened to go to the board to have Brooke removed or there start a legal battle over the company. Brooke countered by telling her that the new line is going to ensure that Victoria will be fired, and Brooke will own the company in full. Victoria later arrived at Clothes Over Bros to scare the sketches for the new line out of Millicent who refused calling her "an evil bitch" to which Victoria replied, "You're going to pay for that". Later that night as Brooke was locking up the store a masked assailant attacked her, brutally injuring her and stealing the computer, money out of the register and the sketches for Brooke's new line. It is speculated that Victoria hired the assailant as a way to steal the sketches with the cover of a robbery so Brooke would be unable to go to the police.

"I loved the opportunity to play such a witch."
—Zuniga on becoming involved with the show.

Brooke later confronted her about the attack/robbery to which Victoria vehemently denied any involvement in. She was shocked to see that Brooke carries a gun with her and explained that she never wanted a child, that she wanted everything Brooke has and that when she could not have it, she decided to end her husband's dream of having a son. Brooke was disgusted with her mother and gave the company over to Victoria who subsequently fired Millicent and closed the Tree Hill Clothes Over Bros store. Victoria returns to Tree Hill after "Clothes over Bros" is failing without Brooke's' help. She manages to convince Brooke to come back with a 51% share, and after previously being shunned by Sam because of her unkindness, also manages to befriend Sam, as shown at the end when she comforts Sam while she cries over Jack's departure. At the end of Season 6, she and Brooke reconcile when Victoria admits she should have loved her more than she loved the company. She returns in Season 7 and instantly picks up on the slight romantic feelings between Julian and Alex Dupre and warns her daughter to be careful. She and Brooke eventually clash once more over the future of the company. Victoria is the one who also learns of Millicent's drug addiction and one night when she and Alex leave TRIC, she calls the cops and reports Millie as a drunk driver, and she is arrested. However, just when Millie is about to have the book thrown at her, Victoria comes to her defense and gets her off, as well as offering her old job back as long as she kicks the habit and never steals from C/B again. She then hires a new designer for the companies' new men's line "Clothes 4 Bros" named Alexander Coyne. Victoria also speaks to Julian and tells him to fight for Brooke as their relationship begins to dissolve. She and her daughter then have another heart to heart where Victoria admits that she is getting "soft." She is caught performing oral sex on Alexander at Quinn's photo gallery opening, and admits as much to the tabloids, which at first thought Brooke was involved.

At the beginning of Season 8, it is discovered Victoria and Millicent have been defrauding Clothes Over Bros. and its investors. Victoria pleads guilty to save her daughter and Millicent and is sent to federal prison. She is released near Thanksgiving and is invited to dinner at the Scott house by Sylvia Baker.

=== Lindsey Strauss ===
Michaela McManus played the role Lindsey Evelyn Strauss during Season 5 and 6. Strauss was Lucas' book-editor and ex-fiancée. When she started to edit his book, they fell in love with each other. She came to Tree Hill when Lucas had writer's block. She felt threatened when Brooke and Peyton returned to Tree Hill, knowing Lucas' history with the two girls. She eventually tried to be friendly to the two girls, but Peyton did not trust her. Later, when Peyton apologized, she agreed to go with Lucas to the opening of Brooke's store. But when she found out that Peyton still had feelings for Lucas, she asked him to stop seeing her. After Lucas kissed Peyton, he proposed to Lindsey, and she said yes. She asked Haley, whom she had befriended, to be her maid of honor and asked Brooke to make her dress. When she got stuck in the Tree Hill Library with Haley, Brooke, Peyton and Mia, she told them her father died from cancer and she had to take him off the ventilator because her mother was too destroyed to do it. The night before the wedding she read Lucas' second novel. At the wedding she realized the book was about Peyton, Lucas' 'Comet', and left Lucas at the altar. Four weeks later Lucas returned to her, she said she still loved Lucas, but she cannot be with him. She returned for Jamie's fifth birthday party and after the party she went to Lucas' house to get her last stuff and to give her key back. She later tells him she is dating someone and gave him his book, telling him he can email her the dedication. When he did, she realized she still loved him and confessed that she lied about seeing someone else. She later learned from Lucas that he and Peyton are engaged. She never shows up at the launch of Lucas's second book but sent someone else in her place.

=== Quentin Fields ===
Robbie Jones played Quentin Christopher Fields during Season 5 and 6. He was a member of the Tree Hill Ravens. He is originally portrayed as an arrogant jock and harassed Haley on her first day of teaching and provoked her to fail him for the quarter on her second day, effectively preventing him from joining the revamped Ravens. He quit school, but thanks to Haley's inability to give up on him and convincing Nathan to tell Quentin that he might lose everything just like he did if he did not quit being such a jerk and tells Quentin that he used to be like that. He went back to both Haley's classes and the team and slowly started to change his attitude. His jersey number for the Tree Hill Ravens is number 44. After hitting Jason to "defend Haley's honor" he suffered from a hand fracture, compromising his chances to be recruited by a college's basketball team. However, after a change of strategy by the Ravens, he became their point guard, even with a broken hand. He also becomes good friends with Jamie and explained that it was because Jamie reminded him so much of his younger brother, Andre. In Episode 2, Season 6, he was shot and killed by an assailant when he accidentally discovered a murder while paying for gas. It is later revealed there is a connection between Quentin's murder and Brooke Davis's attack at Clothes Over Bros. The assailant is Xavier, the brother of Quentin's classmate Sam Walker's friend Jack (he also attacked Brooke at her store for Sam). His jersey #44 is retired by Tree Hill High (joining the #23 jersey of Nathan and #1 jersey for Coach Durham but replacing the #33 jersey worn by Dan, whose number is un-retired after his murder conviction), and as a tribute to Quentin, the Ravens play with only four players the rest of the season.

Following his death, Quentin appears as a ghost to Nathan, urging him to follow his dreams of reaching the NBA. When Nathan is called up to the Charlotte Bobcats, he goes to the cemetery to leave his Bobcats jersey on Quentin's grave. Nathan wrote his initials "QF" and jersey number "44" on one sneaker, writing the initials of Jamie (JLS) and his favorite number (12) on the other shoe. He is briefly mentioned by Jamie in Season 7 when he mentions the people he misses. Jamie and Nathan are in Lucas' house at the time while Julian, Brooke and Alex are at work on the movie.

Quentin is briefly mentioned in Season 9 by Xavier while he attacks Brooke a second time, taunting her for having the same look in her eyes that Quentin had right before Xavier killed him. Xavier showed no remorse for killing Quentin at his parole hearing, something Brooke pointed out to the parole board to no avail.

=== Carrie ===
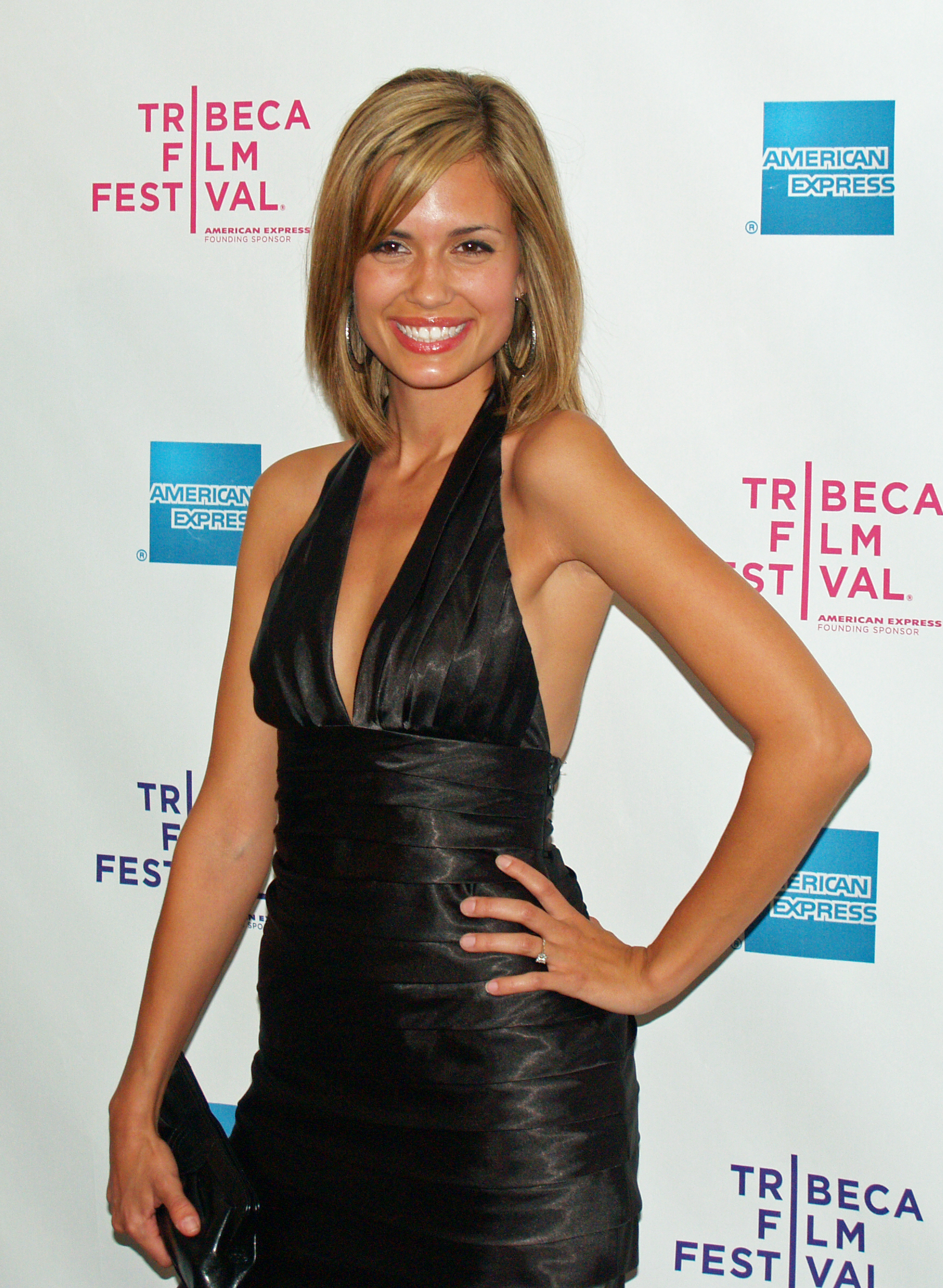
Torrey DeVitto portrays the nanny, Carrie

Portrayed by Torrey DeVitto during Season 5 and 6. Carrie is the main antagonist of the series' Season 5. She is a nanny Haley hired to help her when Nathan was in his wheelchair. She made sexual advances towards Nathan when he regained the use of his legs. After Haley catches her, she kicks both of them out, before reconciling with Nathan. Carrie kidnaps Jamie at Lucas's wedding. He is later rescued by Dan, who threatens to kill her if she ever comes near his family again.

In Season 6, it is revealed she is the person who ran Dan over. She kidnaps him and plans to use him as a lure to kidnap Jamie again and frame Dan for the entire thing. When Dan tries to escape, he discovers the grave of a child and that Carrie once had a young son who died. She poses as a hospice nurse who calls Haley and tells her that Dan is near death and is wishing to see Jamie. Haley takes Jamie to see Dan but tells him to stay in the car while she checks everything out. Once inside, Haley finds Dan restrained to the bed. As she unties him, Dan tries to warn her to get Jamie away, but Carrie sneaks up behind her and knocks her out. As Jamie is wondering where Haley is, Carrie appears and tells him to open the door. Jamie refuses and Carrie gets an ax and breaks the car window, but then sees that Jamie has escaped from the other side of the car and runs into a cornfield. Carrie chases after him, but Jamie is able to hide from her. As he starts running again, he is grabbed by someone who turns out to be Haley. The two of them hide until Haley's phone rings, alerting Carrie to where they are. As she chases Haley and Jamie back to the house, Deb appears and smashes a wine bottle in Carrie's face, momentarily subduing her. Haley asks how she knew where they were, and Deb tells her she knew something was up once she saw the address because Dan always hated the woods. At that moment, Carrie charges at them with the ax but is shot by Dan. Later, Carrie wakes up on the ground and starts laughing at Dan, who is still standing there. Dan tells her that he called the police, and Carrie says that she will get out and come back. Dan reminds her that he told her he would kill her if she ever came near his family again, and Carrie tells Dan she is not dead. Dan says, "Sure you are" and shoots her again, presumably killing her.

=== Mia Catalano ===
"It's an interesting blend. I wondered when I got the role -- would it be better if I was playing Kate Voegele? But I think fans are able to separate Kate Voegele as a musician and Mia as this character who is a part of Tree Hill."
—Voegele on singing her own songs on the show.

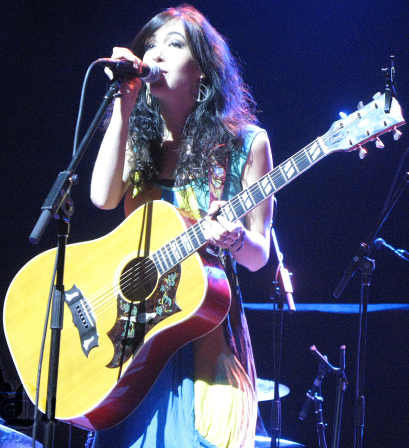
Voegele has played musician Catalano since the fifth season.

Played by Kate Voegele from Season 5 through 8, Mia Catalano was a member of Jason's band, she played the keyboard. She was the only member to stay after Haley kicked Jason out and became Peyton's label's only artist. After being freaked out by Victoria she came back with the realization that music is about talking to people not money which wins Peyton over. She then overcame her demons when she played at TRIC in front of Jason and a whole crowd. She was approached by Peyton's former boss but tricked him into launching her under Peyton's label. After returning from tour she admits to Peyton that she is unable to write anything for the label. Haley begins to help her write again and she starts dating Chase. In Season 7, she hardballs Miranda Stone by threatening to not record if Red Bedroom Records is shut down. Miranda relents and agrees to work with Haley and Mia to keep the label going. She broke up with Chase via a text message because she was never there. However, in the Season 7 finale she asked him if they could date again via a text message. An answer was not given. She is heartbroken when she finds out about Chase and Alex and soon becomes jealous of her and eventually a rivalry starts between them. To take her mind off things, she heads to Portland as part of a Life Unexpected crossover, with Haley to sing at a festival.

After a fist fight at Haley's Thanksgiving dinner, they watch a video of Chase saying he does not want to be with either of them. Mia then starts to slowly form a friendship with Alex. She has "slutty wedding sex" with Chase at Brooke and Julian's wedding, but she later leaves Tree Hill.

=== Owen Morello ===
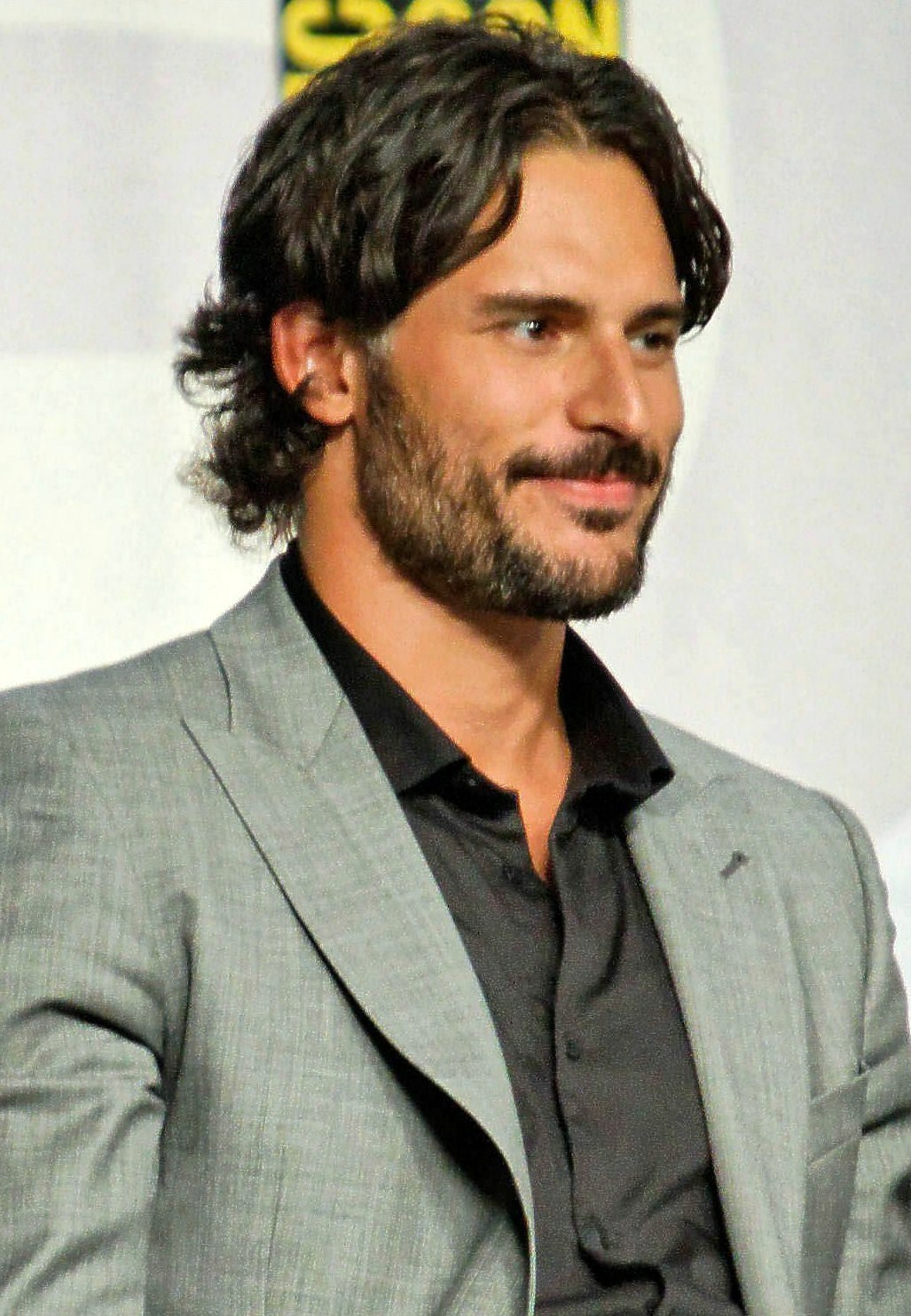
Manganiello played Brooke's love-interest through seasons five and six.

Portrayed by Joe Manganiello from Season 5 through 7, Owen Morello was the new bartender at TRIC. He did not know Brooke was famous until she told him. She tried to seduce him, but he rejected her saying she was too young, in an effort to make her realize she was still young and should enjoy her youth. He revealed that he was a former addict and has been clean for eight years. He is friends with Chase. Owen returned in Season 6 and apologized to Brooke, asking for a second chance. He also was Nathan's teammate while playing Slam Ball. He started drinking again and had a one-night stand with Millicent. He eventually left for rehab, leaving the bar in Chase's hands. In Season 7, Owen reappears at an AA meeting and supports Millicent on her road to recovery.

=== Sam Walker ===
Played by Ashley Rickards during Season 6. Samantha "Sam" Walker is a troubled young girl who shoplifted a top from Clothes over Bros and had an altercation with Brooke. She joined Haley's literature class and Haley encouraged her to write but their relationship was very rocky. In Episode 6 of Season 6, it is revealed that she was a foster child and that she slept in a car in the workshop at Tree Hill High. Brooke later offered her a room at her home to stay in after being urged by Haley to foster Sam. Sam revealed to Brooke that a waitress at the restaurant, she frequents was her birth mom, and one day she was going to introduce herself and tell her 'what a big mistake she made'. Sam and Brooke develop a close relationship, which is strengthened after Brooke saves Sam from Jack's brother, who Brooke realizes was the guy who attacked her in her store (also learning that he had shot Quentin Fields). Later, both Sam and Haley inform Brooke of the positive effect she has had in Sam's life. Sam leaves Brooke's care at the end of the season to rejoin her birth mother.

=== Paul Norris ===
Portrayed by Gregory Harrison since Season 6, Paul Norris is Julian's father. He has stayed very close to Peyton even though she broke up with his son, but much like most Tree Hill parents, he has a very rocky relationship with his son. He has been hinted of sharing an infatuation with Brooke's mother Victoria.

=== Lauren ===
Portrayed by Allison Munn since Season 6. Miss Lauren is Jamie's teacher in Season 6. She first appears in Episode 16 by being invited to dinner at Dan's beach house. Jamie became jealous of and angry with Dan when he tells funny stories of Jamie. Jamie walks in and confronts Dan and Lauren and screams "he was in prison" and storms out. She meets Skills at Jamie's first dance, and they begin a relationship. They are still dating, but Skills has stated he is not ready to take it to the next level and move in with her. However, they are dating for a long time until Skills wants more with his job. Skills applies for a job of a sports coordinator, and he gets the job. But the catch is that the job is in L.A. Skills asks Lauren to leave Tree Hill with him, but she answers that she cannot and loves him even more. While driving Jamie, and his friends Chuck and Madison home during a hurricane, Lauren crashes her car, leaving her life, as well as the children's lives, in danger. Brooke Davis comes to their rescue, and Lauren, as well as Chuck and Madison, get out of harm's way.

Miss Lauren is now dating David, Quinn's ex-husband, and is pregnant with his child.

=== Chuck Scolnik ===
Michael May portrayed Chuck Scolnik in Season 6 through 9. He initially is a bully to Jamie, but later they become friends. We learn that Chucks home life is bad, with an abusive father and alcoholic mother.

=== David Lee Fletcher ===
Scott Holroyd played David Lee Fletcher, Quinn's ex-husband for six episodes during Season 7. He returned to Tree Hill in a bid to win Quinn back. However, after he believes she slept with Clay, he begins a short-lived relationship with her sister, Taylor. He returns a final time in Season 9 with his current girlfriend Miss Lauren.

=== Renee Richardson ===
Kate French played Renee Richardson during Season 7 as a woman who falsely accused Nathan of getting her pregnant to scam him out of money.

=== Miranda Stone ===
Miranda Stone was portrayed by India de Beaufort in Season 7. She is an employee of John Knight at Sire Records who was sent to close down Red Bedroom Records, the label run by Peyton and, later, Haley. She currently works at RBR on behalf of Sire Records. While initially hostile and cold, she has shown some loyalty to Haley after she started working at Red Bedroom, standing up for her against a reporter who wanted to discuss Nathan and Renee's scandal. She has, however, maintained her ruthless work ethic with Haley in spite of her personal problems, refusing to let her take days off work which is a distraction Haley appreciates. She started dating Grubbs for a few weeks before she left because she was deported even though he asked her to marry him.

=== Sara Evans ===
Portrayed by Amanda Schull, Sara Kay Evans was Clay's wife and the mother of Logan Evans. She died at 25 years old, leaving her husband devastated. Clay, wrecked, promised at Sara's funerals to never love again and blocked out their own child. During Season 7 Clay sees Sara's apparitions and has talks with her until he accepts Quinn James in his life. Clay always visits Sara's grave regularly especially when he is lost, like he remembers of Logan.

=== Katie Ryan ===
Katie Ryan was portrayed by Amanda Schull during Season 7 and 8. She is a prospective tennis client of Clay Evans who bears a striking resemblance to his late wife Sara. She stalks Clay and threatens Quinn, crashing Quinn's art gallery opening and buying the picture of Clay that Quinn took. In the Season 7 finale she shoots Quinn and Clay and leaves them for dead. She apparently flees town, but Quinn managed to track her down and plotted killing her but backed out of it. Katie is then seen driving back to Tree Hill where she attacks Quinn again and tells Quinn that she had known all along that she was tracking her. After a chase through her house, Quinn shoots Katie, but calls 911 for her after stating that only a psycho would leave a person bleeding out for twelve hours.

Amanda Schull also played Clay's late wife, Sara Kay Evans. She appeared during Season 7 and 8 in dreams, flashbacks and visions visiting Clay.

=== Josh Avery ===
Paul Teal portrayed Josh Avery for the last six episodes of Season 7. He was a gay actor who starred next to Alex in Julian's movie. He did not want anyone to know he was gay, so he made a sextape with Alex.

=== Dr. August Kellerman ===
Peter Riegert portrayed Dr. August Kellerman in Season 8, Nathan's strict college professor. At first, he and Nathan dislike each other, but after Kellerman takes the blame for an accident his son caused, he and Nathan make amends. Eric McIntire portrayed Kellerman's son, Ian, who is a talented baseball player. Nathan discovers that he is the one that drove the car that hit the car Brooke and Jamie were in. August, a widower, has a skateboarding bulldog named Dogust.

=== Chloe Hall ===
Leven Rambin portrayed Chloe Hall in Season 8, a troubled young girl, who chose Brooke and Julian as the parents of the child she is expecting, but when the baby was born she changed her mind, for the father had come to the hospital.

=== Ted Davis ===
Robert Theodore "Ted" Davis Jr. portrayed by Richard Burgi is the father of Brooke Davis Baker and the husband of Victoria Davis. Absent to his daughter's life from many years he comes back in Tree Hill to the baptism of Brooke's sons Davis and Jude and be the godfather of his grandsons. Later Brooke asks him to help her with her new company Baker Man. Ted says 'Yes' causing new fights between Brooke and Victoria. Ted later comes back, claiming to check up on Brooke after she had been attacked by Xavier in Season 9. However, it is later revealed that he is only back to try and sell Brooke's new company Baker Man, rather than to check up on her and forge a relationship. In the last few episodes, he gets back together with Victoria Davis, acting like the parents Brooke always wanted, having "Baker Man" as a family business.

=== Tara Richards ===
Tara Richards, portrayed by Chelsea Kane, first appears as a rival cafe owner to Haley and Brooke who opens the "Tree Hill Cafe" across the street from the newly reopened "Karen's Cafe". She plays dirty tricks to win customers, including planting cockroaches and hanging a sign that says Karen's Cafe hires murderers (from when Dan helped out Haley when she was short-staffed). After Tara sends a note that says "Fry your burgers, not your babies!" referring to Julian and Davis's accident, Brooke vandalizes Tree Hill Cafe. When Xavier, Brooke's attacker and Quentin Fields' killer, is released from prison, Tara hires him as an employee at Tree Hill Cafe, despite Brooke's warnings. After Xavier attacks and nearly kills Brooke, Tara saves her by striking him from behind with a taser. Brooke later settles her differences with Tara, after she saved her. Tara later sold her cafe, which Brooke would later open as her new store "Baker Man".

== Other characters ==
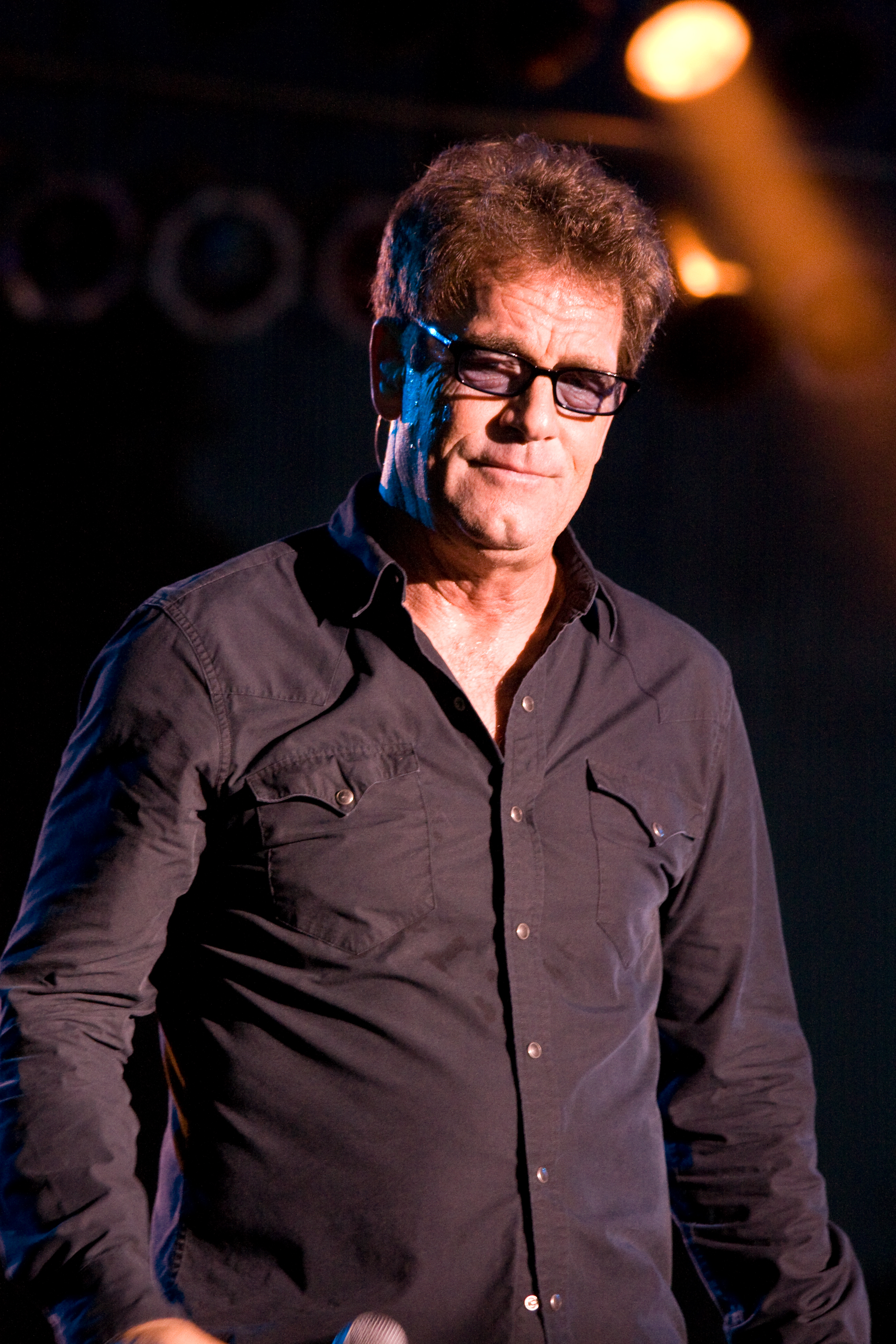
Musician Huey Lewis guest starred as Haley's father during season two.

Jimmy Edwards played by Colin Fickes in Season 1 and 3, was a student at Tree Hill high and a friend of Lucas and Mouth's from the River Court. When Lucas and Mouth started to get close to the 'popular' kids such as Brooke, Nathan, and Peyton, Jimmy felt isolated and started to hate his time at school. After he was humiliated by the time capsule release, he brought a handgun to school and fired a shot putting the school on lockdown. He then held Haley, Nathan, and several other students in the tutor center hostage before he killed himself.

Huey Lewis portrayed James "Jimmy" James during Season 2. Jimmy James is the father of Haley, Quinn, Taylor, Vivian and three unnamed sons. Easy going, he puts the happiness of his children and wife before anything else showcased when he fully supported Haley's decision to marry during her junior year. He and Lydia toured America in an RV. In Season 7, it was revealed by a visit from Lydia that Jimmy had died a few years prior.

Abigail "Abby" Brown, portrayed by Allison Scagliotti in Seasons 3 and 4, is a former Tree Hill High School student who witnesses Dan Scott murder his brother Keith during the school shooting and subsequently tells Lucas the truth after he finds her. After her confession, she left Tree Hill, but the news she delivered shocked the residents.

Series creator Mark Schwahn appeared in Season 3 and 4 as Max, the owner of the towns record store.

Rick Fox played a loan shark named Daunte Jones during Season 4. He ran Haley over after Nathan lost him money during the state championship basketball game. He died when his car crashed after hitting Haley.

The specter of Dawson's Creek is always around us. We're about to [complete] 128 episodes, which is what Dawson's did. So I thought it would be cool to get James.

— Mark Schwahn on casting Van Der Beek.

John Doe played Mick Wolf, who is Peyton's biological father, whom Peyton tricks into telling her that he is her real father when he asks her about her real mother Ellie. She later thanks him for giving her up as she agrees with him that he and Ellie would not have been able to take care of her properly.

James Van Der Beek played Adam Reese for four episodes during Season 6. He joined the cast as an eccentric director who was interested in making a film out of Lucas' novel.

Andrew Elvis Miller portrayed DiMitri in Season 9. DiMitri was a Slavic gangster who held Nathan hostage and was later killed.

The series has featured musical guests including Gavin DeGraw, Sheryl Crow, The Wreckers, Lupe Fiasco, Jimmy Eat World, Nada Surf, Michelle Branch, Pete Wentz, Fall Out Boy, Cheap Trick, Jack's Mannequin, Nick Lachey, Kid Cudi, and Dave Navarro.
