= Bevin Prince =

American actress (born 1982 or 1983)

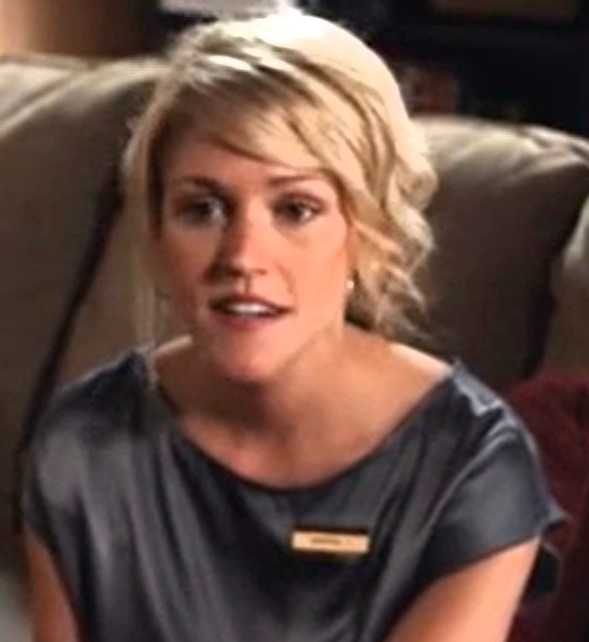
- Prince in The Love Affair, 2010 short film
- Born: 1982 or 1983 (age 43–44); Charlotte, North Carolina, U.S.
- Education: Savannah College of Art and Design; University of North Carolina at Wilmington; New York Film Academy
- Occupations: Actress, fitness instructor
- Years active: 2003–2012 (actress)
- Notable work: One Tree Hill
- Spouse: Will Friend (m. 2016; died 2022)
- Website: www.bevinprince.com

Bevin Anne Prince (born 1982 or 1983) is an American former actress and current fitness instructor, who is best known for her role as Bevin Mirskey on The CW's hit series One Tree Hill.

== Early life ==
Prince was born in Charlotte, North Carolina, and her family moved to Cary, North Carolina. She attended Martin Middle School where she was a member of a cheerleading squad that won first place in the Wake County Cheerleading Contest.

For high school, she attended Saint Mary's School, a private all-girl Episcopal prep school in Raleigh, North Carolina, where she performed in musical theater. After graduating from high school in 2000, Prince attended North Carolina State University, but transferred to the University of North Carolina Wilmington. There, she was a member of the Seahawk Dance Team (2002–2003) and graduated in the first class of UNC Wilmington's new film studies program.

To prepare for more advanced roles, Prince attended the New York Film Academy, and also earned a MFA from Savannah College of Art and Design.

== Career ==
=== Television ===
While still a student at UNC Wilmington in 2004, Prince was cast as an extra and played a cheerleader on the WB (later The CW) television series One Tree Hill. The cheerleader role evolved into Bevin Mirskey, a major recurring role from season one through four. Prince appeared in 41 episodes of One Tree Hill, including returning for the series finale in season nine. However, Prince says they worked sixteen to eighteen-hour days and only earned $75 a day in the early seasons.

In 2005, Prince was cast as Millison, one of the six core characters for the PAX Television show Palmetto Point. As her career shifted away from roles filmed in North Carolina, she moved to Los Angeles, California and appeared in a variety of shows, including an episode of Desperate Housewives and House.

=== Film ===
In 2009, Prince appeared as Ariel in the independent horror film Dark House. Dark House premiered at the Los Angeles Fangoria Weekend of Horrors and was screened at the Cannes Film Festival. After a limited time in theaters, the film was released on DVD in 2010.

Prince had the role of Faye in the horror film Wreckage. The film was completed in May 2009 and released through streaming in 2012. Prince also played the role of Denise in the thriller Groupie (2010), and the role of Stacey in The Artifact (2011).

=== Fitness ===
In 2012, Prince moved to New York City and waited tables before becoming an instructor for SoulCycle. She became a senior SoulCycle instructor as well as their regional field officer for instructor development.

She shared her daily fitness routine with Women's Health magazine in 2017. She also became a brand ambassador for the athletic apparel company Lululemon Athletica.

In 2020, she opened her own open-aired cycling studio, Recess by Bevin Prince. Recess is located at in the Mayfaire Town Center at 1055 International Drive in Wilmington, North Carolina.

== Personal life ==
In May 2016, Prince married Will Friend in Turks and Caicos. Friend was born and raised in England, moving to the United States when he was fifteen years old. A graduate of Southern Methodist University, he became CEO of Bisnow Media in 2015.

When the former showrunner for One Tree Hill Mark Schwahn was accused of sexual harassment by a female staff writer in 2017, Prince joined other cast members in signing a letter of support that was published in Variety.

From 2018 to 2020, Prince had a podcast called Be My Neighbor, along with Brittany Levine.

After the start of COVID-19 pandemic, Prince and Friend decided to leave New York City and move to Wilmington, North Carolina to be closer to her family. On July 3, 2022, Friend was struck by lightning on Masonboro Island while boating with friends and died of his injuries, at age 33.

== Filmography ==
=== Film ===
Year	Film	Role	Notes
2008	I Heart Veronica Martin	Valerie	short
2009	Redefining Love	Gwyn	
2009	Dark House	Ariel	
2010	Groupie	Denise	
2010	Wreckage	Faye	
2011	The Artifact	Stacey	

=== Television ===
Year	Title	Role	Notes
2004–2008, 2012	One Tree Hill	Bevin Mirskey	41 episodes (Seasons 1-5 & 9)
2007	House	Megan	Season 4, episode 1
2009	Desperate Housewives	Mariana	Season 5, episode 17
2009	Electric Spoofaloo	Amanda	1 episode
2009	Floored and Lifted	Mrs. Mackers	3 episodes
