= Ella Newton =

Australian actress

- Born: 7 December 2000 (age 25); Melbourne, Australia
- Occupation: Actress
- Years active: 2013–present

Ella Newton is an Australian actress. She is best known for playing Fern Harrow in Harrow (2018–2021) and Amy in Girl at the Window (2022).

== Early life ==
Newton was born in Melbourne on 7 December 2000. She graduated from Wesley College, Melbourne in 2018. She completed a seven-month course at The Australian Film & Television Academy (TAFTA) as well as short courses. While still at Wesley, she appeared on stage in Shakespeare's Mid Summer Nights Dream as Hermia under the college's Adamson Theatre Company in 2013.

== Career ==
Newton had a minor role in the stage production, Rules for Living, at Red Stitch Theatre, St. Kilda East in March–April 2017. Her early television role was portraying Lydia, the daughter of lawyer Josephine Newton (Claudia Karvan) in Newton's Law (2017). Newton's breakthrough role was playing Fern Harrow in the forensic drama series, Harrow (2018–2021). Fern is the titular pathologist's wayward daughter.

Newton's first big movie was Girl at the Window (2022) where she undertook the main role of Amy. Amy is a troubled student whose dad had just died; she suspects her neighbour is a serial killer. She also starred in the theatre production of A Play About Ivy, That Is Really About June as June, which premiered at Theatre Works, St. Kilda in October 2022.

Newton appeared as Heather in the horror film Dangerous Animals (2025) alongside Jai Courtney and Hassie Harrison. In January 2026, the actress was cast in another horror film, Evil Dead Wrath, from director Francis Galluppi. Filming began in the following month in New Zealand.

== Filmography ==
=== Film ===
Year	Title	Role	Notes
2018	Lavender	Poppy	Short
2021	Don't Come in... Yet!	Woman	Short
2022	Girl at the Window	Amy Poynton	
2025	Dangerous Animals	Heather	
2026	The Mosquito Bowl	Jane	
2028	Evil Dead Wrath	TBA	Post-production

=== Television ===
Year	Title	Role	Notes
2017	Newton's Law	Lydia Newton-Docker	7 episodes
2018	Playing for Keeps	Ella Rickards	Episode; Episode #1.8
2018-2019	Neighbours	Delaney Renshaw	14 episodes
2018-2021	Harrow	Fern Harrow	30 episodes
2019	SeaChange	Stella Connors	6 episodes
2020	Kit & Em	Em	
