= Hassie Harrison =

American actress (born 1990)

- Born: March 20, 1990 (age 36); Dallas, Texas, U.S.
- Education: Southern Methodist University
- Occupation: Actress
- Years active: 2014–present
- Spouse: Ryan Bingham (m. 2023)
- Relatives: Hunt family (Texas)
- Family: Caroline Rose Hunt (grandmother); H.L. Hunt, Jr. (great grandfather)

Hassie Elizabeth Harrison (born March 20, 1990) is an American actress known for her performances in The Iron Orchard (2018), Tacoma FD (2019–23) and Yellowstone (2020–24). She also assists with her family’s ranching business, Rosewood Beef.

In 2026, Harrison was cast as Nat for the upcoming reboot of Baywatch.

== Early life and education ==
Born and raised in Dallas, Texas, Hassie Harrison is the daughter of Frank Walls Harrison III and Laurie Sands Harrison, the granddaughter of the late philanthropist Caroline Rose Hunt, and the great-granddaughter of billionaire oilman H.L. Hunt, Jr. (patriarch of the prominent Hunt family of Texas). Harrison’s early exposure to the arts came through her mother’s involvement with the Dallas Children's Theater.

Academically gifted, she completed high school in a year and a half and began studying at Southern Methodist University at age 15. She also studied European cinema abroad in Copenhagen, Denmark. Harrison later trained with renowned acting coach Ivana Chubbuck and studied improvisational comedy at the Upright Citizens Brigade in Los Angeles.

== Personal life ==
Since April 2023, Harrison has been in a relationship with singer-songwriter Ryan Bingham, who is also featured in Yellowstone. They were married on October 7, 2023, at her family's estate in Dallas. She previously dated actors Wilson Bethel and Austin Nichols.

== Filmography ==
Year	Title	Role	Notes
2015	Southbound	Jem	
2015	Dementia	Shelby Lockhart	
2016	The First Time	Andie	Short
2016	Chunk & Bean	Denise Morgan	TV movie
2017	Fat Camp	Stephanie	
2018	The Iron Orchard	Mazie Wales	
2018	A.X.L.	Kirsten - Gas Station Girl	
2020	Max Reload and the Nether Blasters	Liz	
2022	Back to Lyla	Lyla	
2023	Quasi	Margot	
2025	Dangerous Animals	Zephyr	
2027	The Rescue †	Kaley Tucker	Movie; Post-production

=== Television ===
Year	Title	Role	Notes
2014	L.A. Rangers	Olivia	1 episode
2014–2015	Hart of Dixie	Lucy	3 episodes
2015	4th Annual Saving Innocence Gala: Live from the SLS Hotel	Herself	TV special
2015	The Astronaut Wives Club	Cracked Cookie	1 episode
2019–2024	Tacoma FD	Lucy McConky	Main role; 48 episodes
2020–2024	Yellowstone	Laramie	9 episodes
2025	Tires	Colleen	TV series
2027	Baywatch	Nat	TV series

=== Other ===
Year	Title	Role	Notes
2016	Hayley Kiyoko: Gravel to Tempo	Bubblegum Girl	Music video
2019	Life's Wonders	Herself	Interview
