= The House of Usher (2006 film) =

- Directed by: Hayley Cloake
- Screenplay by: Collin Chang
- Story by: Boyd Hancock
- Based on: "The Fall of the House of Usher" by Edgar Allan Poe
- Produced by: Boyd Hancock
- Starring: Austin Nichols; Izabella Miko; Beth Grant
- Cinematography: Eric Trageser
- Edited by: Jo Francis
- Production company: Abernathy Productions
- Distributed by: THINKFilm
- Release dates: September 15, 2006 (Boston); September 11, 2007
- Running time: 81 minutes
- Country: United States
- Language: English
- Budget: $130,000

The House of Usher is a 2006 American drama thriller film based on the 1839 Edgar Allan Poe short story "The Fall of the House of Usher". The film was directed by Hayley Cloake and written by Collin Chang. It stars Austin Nichols, Izabella Miko and Beth Grant.

== Plot ==
Jill Masters (Izabella Miko) has not seen or heard from her ex-lover, Roderick "Rick" Usher (Austin Nichols), or her best friend (Rick's twin), Madeline "Maddy" Usher (Danielle McCarthy), for three years. One night, Rick contacts Jill and informs her of Maddy's sudden death. Her last wish was for Jill to attend the funeral. Conflicted, Jill returns to the family home of the Usher family. Her love affair with Rick is rekindled as she learns he suffers from the same malady that robbed his twin sister, Maddy, of her sharp mind before taking her life. His affliction is manifested in a rare nerve condition, which renders him hypersensitive. Under the watchful eye of the caretaker, Nurse Thatcher (Beth Grant), Jill appears to be haunted by Maddy's ghost.

Meanwhile, Jill becomes intimate with Rick and tells him she has missed her period. A pregnancy test confirms Jill is pregnant. In the meantime, Jill has discovered that the Usher family has practiced twincest for the past five or six generations, right down to Maddy and Rick. All the prior generations had twins, who later became a couple and birthed twins of their own and so on down the line to Maddy and Rick, who were to continue the Usher curse.

== Cast ==
- Austin Nichols as Roderick "Rick" Usher
- Izabella Miko as Jill Michaelson
- Beth Grant as Nurse Thatcher
- Stephen C. Fischer as Rupert Johnson
- Danielle McCarthy as Madeline "Maddy" Usher
- Elizabeth Duff as Nurse Lambert
- Robin Kurian as Shay
- Ann Richardson Howland as Edith

== Production ==
The film was shot throughout Massachusetts: Danvers, Newburyport, and Rowley in April 2005 on a $130,000 budget.

== See also ==
- Edgar Allan Poe in television and film
