= Max Reload and the Nether Blasters =

- Directed by: Scott Conditt; Jeremy Tremp
- Written by: Scott Conditt; Jeremy Tremp
- Produced by: Scott Conditt; Rob Edwards; Greg Grunberg; Jeremy Tremp
- Starring: Tom Plumley; Hassie Harrison; Joey Morgan; Lukas Gage; Greg Grunberg; Lin Shaye; Joseph D. Reitman
- Cinematography: Jeremy Tremp
- Edited by: Scott Conditt; Jeremy Tremp
- Music by: Jesse Mitchell
- Production company: CineForge Media
- Release date: 7 August 2020
- Running time: 100 minutes
- Country: United States
- Language: English

Max Reload and the Nether Blasters is a 2020 American science fiction action-comedy film directed by Scott Conditt and Jeremy Tremp, starring Tom Plumley, Hassie Harrison, Joey Morgan, Lukas Gage, Greg Grunberg, Lin Shaye and Joseph D. Reitman.

== Cast ==
- Tom Plumley as Max Jenkins
- Hassie Harrison as Liz
- Joey Morgan as Reggie
- Lukas Gage as Seth
- Greg Grunberg as Eugene Wylder / MMO Wizard
  - Jake Grunberg as Young Eugene
- Lin Shaye as Mrs. Wylder
- Joseph D. Reitman as Barton Grabowski
  - Jacob Mendoza as Young Barton
- Martin Kove as Gramps Jenkins
- Jesse Kove as Steve
- Richard Lippert as The Harbinger
- Kevin Smith as Chuck
- Wil Wheaton as Arcade Heroes Narrator (voice)
- Scott Conditt as TV Cowboy #1

== Reception ==
Phil Hoad of The Guardian rated the film 3 stars out of 5 and called it a "slight but eager tribute to the home-computing heyday."

Tara McNamara of Common Sense Media rated the film 3 stars out of 5 and wrote while it "isn't good by any means", it "racks up a lot of happiness points if your personal nostalgia aligns with the film's."

Richard Whittaker of The Austin Chronicle rated the film 2 stars out of 5 and wrote, "So if you've worn out your DVD of Angry Video Game Nerd: The Movie (or even know who the Angry Video Game Nerd is), it'll be a distraction but no Triple A release."
