= Harrow (TV series) =

2018 Australian medical drama/mystery TV series

- Genre: Medical drama; Mystery
- Created by: Stephen M. Irwin; Leigh McGrath
- Written by: Stephen M. Irwin; Leigh McGrath
- Directed by: Peter Andrikidis; Grant Brown; Tony Tilse; Mairi Cameron; Tony Krawitz
- Starring: Ioan Gruffudd; Jolene Anderson; Mirrah Foulkes; Remy Hii; Anna Lise Phillips; Darren Gilshenan; Damien Garvey; Ella Newton; Robyn Malcolm; Hunter Page-Lochard; Uli Latukefu; Tony Barry
- Composer: Matteo Zingales
- Country of origin: Australia
- Original language: English
- No. of series: 3
- No. of episodes: 30

Production
- Producers: Leigh McGrath; Tracey Robertson; Nathan Mayfield
- Production location: Brisbane
- Cinematography: John Stokes; Simon Chapman; Robert Humphreys; Mark Wareham
- Running time: 52 minutes
- Production companies: Hoodlum Entertainment; ABC Signature (Note: Credited as ABC Studios International until season 2)

Original release
- Network: ABC
- Release: 9 March 2018 – 11 April 2021

Harrow is an Australian television drama series, which ran for three seasons of ten episodes each. The first season premiered on the ABC on 9 March 2018. The second began on 12 May 2019, while the third started on 7 February 2021. The series was created by Stephen M. Irwin and Leigh McGrath, who are also its scriptwriters, and stars Ioan Gruffudd. Gruffudd made his directorial debut during the third series in February 2021.

The series revolves around the titular Daniel Harrow (Gruffudd), a Queensland-based forensic pathologist. Each episode finds Daniel solving a specific case with the assistance of Brisbane police officer Sgt. Soroya Dass (Mirrah Foulkes) and fellow pathologists Grace Molyneux (Jolene Anderson) and Simon Van Reyk (Remy Hii). Alongside these cases are more long-term concerns revolving around Daniel's private life and family.

== Premise ==
Harrow details the life and work of Dr. Daniel Harrow, a Queensland-based forensic pathologist, who often disregards authority. He has an empathy for the dead, which helps to solve bizarre cases. Daniel is willing to bend rules and use unorthodox procedures in his determination to give victims a voice and reveal the truth behind what happened to them. Meanwhile, a secret from his past threatens his career, his family, and himself.

== Cast ==
=== Main ===
- Ioan Gruffudd as Dr. Daniel Harrow, senior forensic pathologist at the fictitious Queensland Institute of Forensic Medicine (QIFM), an intelligent and unconventional scientist who delves for the real reasons people have died, though he hides his own dark secrets.
- Mirrah Foulkes as Sergeant Soroya Dass, Queensland Police uniformed criminal investigator, and Daniel's love interest (season 1).
- Remy Hii as Simon Van Reyk, junior forensic pathologist, Daniel's assistant and protégé (seasons 1–2).
- Anna Lise Phillips as Stephanie Tolson, Daniel's ex-wife, Fern's mother, and a primary school teacher (seasons 1–2).
- Darren Gilshenan as Lyle Ridgewell Livingston Fairley, senior forensic pathologist at QIFM; conventional and meticulous, he remains in Daniel's shadow as less flamboyant.
- Damien Garvey as Bryan Nichols, Detective Senior Sergeant at Queensland Police's Criminal Investigation Branch. Though Daniel irritates him, they respect each other professionally.
- Ella Newton as Fern Harrow, Daniel and Stephanie's daughter, who has been living on the streets for two years.
- Hunter Page-Lochard as Callan Prowd, Fern's boyfriend, convicted drug seller.
- Robyn Malcolm as Maxine Aleksandra Pavich, Director of QIFM and Daniel's boss, and Bryan's love interest (seasons 1–2).
- Tony Barry as Jack Twine, Daniel's ex-boss at QIFM and long-time mentor, and nursing home resident (season 1).
- Jolene Anderson as Dr. Grace Molyneux, Lyle's niece, junior forensic pathologist at QIFM, former neurosurgeon, and Daniel's love interest (seasons 2–3).

=== Recurring and guest ===
- Faustina Agolley as Edwina Gharam, surgery nurse, becomes QIFM's new assistant forensic pathologist (seasons 2–3).
- Grant Bowler as Francis Andrew Chester, convicted serial killer, identified by Laurie as dying in a prison fire six months ago (season 2).
- Miriama Smith as Renae Warrington, Maxine's replacement as QIFM director, hired to implement quotas and cost-cutting restructure, shares custody of son, Louie (season 3).
- Harrison Gilbertson as James Reed, Tanya's son, he claims to be Daniel's long-estranged English-born son (season 3).
- Uli Latukefu as Jesse Walsh, Stephanie's boyfriend (season 1).
- Diana Glenn as Mila Zoric, businesswoman, mother of Max (season 3).
- Tim Ross as Dr. Ben Patterson, paediatric surgeon, Grace's estranged, then divorced husband (season 3).
- Hugh Parker as Doug Hinton, Queensland Deputy Coroner (seasons 2–3).
- Tasneem Roc as Jill McCloud, Queensland police drug squad detective (seasons 1–2).
- Ditch Davey as Robert Quinn, former police sergeant, Stephanie's second husband, Fern's stepfather, missing for 10 months (season 1).
- Sara Wiseman as Tanya Ann Hain (previously Tanya Ann Reed), English woman, Daniel's long-ago girlfriend, mother of James (season 3).
- Geoff Morrell as Dr. Laurie Badcoe, North Queensland forensic pathologist, previously Daniel's supervisor (season 2).
- Andrew Buchanan as Kiriakos, Queensland police Inspector (season 1).
- Josephine Flynn as "Detective": plain clothes Queensland police detective (season 2).
- Heather Mitchell as Louise Whitehall (previously Louise Chester), widow of Dr. Maurice Chester, Francis' mother (season 2).
- Anthony Standish as Tim Markides, chemist, employed Fern, gambler (season 2).
- Erroll Shand as Brendan Skene, ex-prisoner, gambler, illiterate, confesses to shooting Daniel (season 2).
- Ed Wightman as Yellowly, SOCO allied with police and QIFM (season 1).
- Sophia Emberson-Bain as Sage Wu, Ben's divorce lawyer, becomes his fiancée (season 3).
- Virginie Laverdure as Bec Crowley, Queensland police superintendent, Bryan's boss (seasons 2–3).
- Dorian Nkono as Lewison, underworld contact, known to Fern (season 1).
- Oliver De Los Santos as Louie Warrington, Renae's young son, hangs around QIFM (season 3).
- Steven Lunavich as Dieter Schuh, pawnbroker, used by Fern and Daniel (season 1).
- Korey Williams as "Drug squad officer" (season 2) and "Henchman #2" (season 3).
- Gary Sweet as Bruce Reimers, Olivia's father, suspects her fiancé of killing Olivia (season 1).
- Ian Bliss as Charlie Oberg
- Kaiya Jones as Madison Moreland
- Joe Klocek as Sean Paulson
- John Batchelor as Clayton Pike
- Laura Gordon as Audrey
- Marta Kaczmarek as Ruth Kovacs
- Georgina Naidu as Alison Chen
- Mercia Deane-Johns as Sofia Calanna
- Scott Johnson as Reverend Joshua Mercado
- Richard Brancatisano as Sergeant Gabriel Capello
- Anthony Brandon Wong as Dave Young (season 3)
- Lasarus Ratuere as Myles Hendry
- Rhonda Doyle as Brenda Sallow

== Episodes ==
Series	Episodes	Originally released		Avg. Aus. viewers
Series	Episodes	First released	Last released	Avg. Aus. viewers
1	10	9 March 2018	11 May 2018	548,700
2	10	12 May 2019	14 July 2019	463,200
3	10	7 February 2021	11 April 2021	427,400

=== Season 1 (2018) ===
No. overall	No. in season	Title	Directed by	Written by	Original release date	Aus. viewers
1	1	"Actus Reus" ("Guilty Act")	Kate Dennis	Stephen M. Irwin	9 March 2018	665,000
Flashback: a hooded figure drops a corpse into a river during a dark night. Present: Daniel offers to take Fern sailing to Bora Bora. He has a last case pending: the death of a young woman, Olivia found in her bathroom. According to Lyle, Olivia had died as a result of a drug-related accident. Olivia's father, Bruce believes Olivia's fiancé, Kurt murdered her and urges Daniel to re-examine the evidence. Daniel quizzes Bryan, who led the investigation, about the case and meets Soroya. Daniel and Simon eventually discover evidence that Kurt, a real estate manager, had faked Olivia's signature to offload his debt properties on her. When Olivia found out, Kurt killed her and made it look like an overdose. Daniel injures Kurt so he has to have his hand X-rayed, which discloses a chip of Olivia's tooth, lodged when he forced drugs down her throat. Daniel and Fern are about to set off for Bora Bora, when Soroya calls Daniel to the river, where a decomposed, headless corpse has been discovered. Flashback: the hooded figure, disposing the body, is Daniel.
2	2	"Ex Animo" ("From the Soul")	Peter Salmon	Stephen M. Irwin	16 March 2018	561,000
Soroya and Daniel attend the corpse of a woman, Phillipa found in the woods. Phillipa had been shot in the chest with a medieval-style crossbow but most of the arrow was removed. Simon begins to investigate the river bones, which are encased in concrete. Daniel makes several attempts to slow Simon's progress. Nevertheless, Simon is able to extract a vial of DNA from the bones. Daniel visits his mentor, Jack at a nursing home. He asks Jack if he had ever been tempted to forge evidence. Daniel provides Jack with oxycodone for pain relief. Meanwhile, Fern runs away with Callan and they squat in a succession of empty homes. Soroya and Daniel trace the arrow back to a couple, Charlotte and Blake, who killed Phillipa as part of their ritualistic hunting. The pair attempt to kill Daniel but are confronted and arrested by Soroya. Later that night, Daniel sneaks into Jack's nursing home to get a DNA sample from another resident, but is caught by Jack. Daniel takes the resident's sample back to the lab and switches it with Simon's vial from the river bones.
3	3	"Hic Sunt Dracones" ("Here Be Dragons")	Peter Salmon	Stephen M. Irwin	23 March 2018	473,000
Daniel and Soroya travel to North Queensland to investigate the discovery of a human arm inside a dead crocodile. Local police sergeant, Gabriel and local crocodile expert, Millicent, assist them. Daniel, Soroya and Millicent find the rest of the male's corpse, John Doe in the crocodile's den. Daniel and Soroya determine that John had died from eating rat poison. No local people are reported missing, however they determine the crocodile's movements from its GPS tracker. Daniel, Soroya and Gabriel have narrowed their focus to three boats at the local marina. Initially they suspect the first boat's owner, Michael, to be the culprit. They later discover that a married couple, Alister and Lena, in the marina had killed the victim and are now posing as the owners of his boat. The couple are arrested. Daniel and Soroya are invited by Gabriel to a party and begin to express their feelings for each other. After Daniel returns home, Simon displays an orthopaedic plate, which was found on the river bones. Simon reveals its serial number, which should identify the victim.
4	4	"Finis Vitae Sed Non Amoris" ("The End of Life, but Not of Love")	Tony Krawitz	Stephen M. Irwin	30 March 2018	546,000
Daniel and Soroya independently research the plate's serial number. After consulting Jack, Daniel finds the orthopaedic surgeon, who implanted the plate. Daniel convinces the surgeon's widow to let him take the file, before Soroya arrives. Daniel later burns the file. Daniel and Soroya also investigate the bones of a woman, Sally found in a tree. Sally had been a homeless woman looking for her missing boy. Sally started stalking Cassandra and Noah, but a DNA test determined that Noah was not Sally's child. Years later Sally was still stalking Noah, when she was killed. Daniel finds that Sally was a chimera (different cells have different DNA). Noah was actually Sally's son. Cassandra, who had kidnapped Noah to raise as her own child, is arrested. Daniel realises that Noah, as a child, had stabbed Sally, out of fear. Meanwhile, Daniel and Soroya go on an accidental double date with Stephanie and her new boyfriend, Jesse. Callan buys drugs with his and Fern's money. Callan is ambushed soon after the sale. Suspicious of events, Fern negotiates with the dealer, Billie who gives her new drugs to sell.
5	5	"Non Sum Qualis Eram" ("I'm Not What I Used to Be")	Tony Krawitz	Stephen M. Irwin	6 April 2018	462,000
Fern sells Billie's drugs at a devil-themed rave party. A young, hallucinating woman, Grace, jumps off the balcony to her death. While Daniel and Soroya attend Grace's corpse they learn that another victim, Hannah is in ER. Hannah might die if they cannot determine the drug. Meanwhile, another woman, Xantia is killed in a park. Daniel starts an unauthorised autopsy, to examine Grace's stomach. Bryan and Jill discover that Daniel's car had been near the rave scene. Grace's autopsy is unproductive: the drug remains unknown. Fern finds Billie dead at his home, she takes his drugs. Fern gives Daniel drug samples to analyse, which saves Hannah. When Jill closes in on Fern, Daniel tries to help her and discovers the cases are connected. Billie, who was under the influence of Xantia's drugs, had killed Xantia. Daniel and Soroya have sex on his boat. Maxine orders the river bones to be cremated, as they are no longer useful. Lyle calls Soroya to tell her he concluded that the bones had been in the water less than a year. The bones may belong to Stephanie's missing second husband, Robert.
6	6	"Aurum Potestas Est" ("Gold Is Power")	Tony Tilse	Stephen M. Irwin	13 April 2018	547,000
Soroya researches Robert who disappeared 10 months earlier. She halts the river bones' cremation. Meanwhile Soroya and Daniel investigate the death of a Danish student, Lotte who is found dismembered by a freight train. Despite wanting more time to search the site they are over-ruled by their police commissioner. Lotte died elsewhere due to lack of blood. Police find the corpse of Lotte's friend, Janik. Their times of death match. Janik was smothered by cling wrap. Semen is lodged in his oesophagus. Lotte's nightclub stamp leads to an exclusive hotel's penthouse suite. A minister orders Bryan to slowdown the investigation. A Chinese multimillionaire, Harry, hired the suite. Harry and the government are negotiating a significant mining contract. Two of Harry's thugs kidnap Daniel and threaten Stephanie's life. At a party celebrating the now-signed contract, Daniel confronts Harry, while unofficially collecting a DNA sample. Harry flies to China and cannot be prosecuted. Soroya falsifies a police request for more search personnel. They find Quinn's car dumped in a lake. Callan's stepmother agrees to allow him to live at her deceased brother's house, but Fern doubts leaving Brisbane.
7	7	"Pia Mater" ("Gentle Mother")	Tony Krawitz	Stephen M. Irwin	20 April 2018	506,000
Soroya is taken off investigating Robert's disappearance when it is revealed that she and Daniel are dating. Maxine does not want Daniel to know the bones may be Robert's. Nichols now investigates Robert and interviews Stephanie. Fern learns that police found Robert's car from Stephanie and tells Daniel. Meanwhile, Soroya attends a car crash. The mother, Kerrie and adult son, Glenn are both dead. Maxine orders Daniel and Lyle to work together and complete an autopsy each. Simon finds a 20 year-old bullet in Glenn's brain. With the help of local ex-policeman, Royce, Daniel connects Glenn to the decades-old disappearance of a teenager, Holly, and friend of Glenn's younger sister, Audrey. As a teen Glenn killed Holly, and Kerrie shot Glenn. The bullet in his brain had changed his personality to more docile. Some weeks earlier the bullet moved after a minor car accident. Glenn's old personality returned and he started choking Audrey. Kerrie, who had terminal cancer, caused the fatal accident to protect Audrey. Callan leaves Brisbane, but Fern stays because she has issues to resolve concerning Robert's car reappearing. Police hear Stephanie's voice-mail threat to kill Robert, from just before his disappearance.
8	8	"Peccata Patris" ("Sins of the Father")	Catriona McKenzie	Leigh McGrath	27 April 2018	603,000
Bryan discovers Robert replaced two car tyres before he disappeared. Divers find Robert's skull. Stephanie queries Soroya about police surveillance of her house. Soroya sees Stephanie has Robert's wedding band. Stephanie tells Bryan she found it in her mailbox. Stephanie could not have killed Robert as she was in a hospital with a broken rib. Meanwhile, Daniel investigates the death of a gay high-school rower, Rhys. Daniel and Simon discover Rhys did not fall where he was found. Rhys had ingested semen, which leads to fellow rower, Sean. Sean's homophobic father, Julian pushed Rhys over. He fell onto an ornamental stone fountain, accidentally causing a severe head blow. Instead of getting emergency assistance Julian forced Sean to stand by as Rhys died. The pair then disposed of Rhys' corpse. Maxine considers a Geneva-based job offer; Lyle manoeuvres for her position. Lyle accidentally tells Bryan about Geneva. Bryan proposes marriage to Maxine. Daniel tells Soroya about his father hanging himself when Daniel was a teen. Jack mentored Daniel and inspired him to study pathology. Jack later gifted Daniel with an antique surgery kit. Bryan's team finds CCTV, which shows Fern slashed Robert's tyres.
9	9	"Lex Talionis" ("The Law of Retaliation")	Daniel Nettheim	Stephen M. Irwin	4 May 2018	553,000
Bryan's team now investigates Fern over Robert's death. Bryan asks Maxine if Daniel worked on 3 October. Maxine sees two asterisks beside Daniel's name and asks Simon. Fern discovers the last number on Robert's phone is the pay phone on Daniel's wharf. Bryan tries to blackmail Callan into betraying Fern. Instead Callan uses his phone calls to warn Fern and Daniel. Bryan discovers Fern's alibi: she obtained money for Callan's bail at a pawnbroker. Simon learns from tech support that the asterisks mean the server went down. Daniel informed them himself. Soroya checks the pawnshop's CCTV, sees Fern pawning the antique surgery kit followed soon after by Daniel reclaiming it. Meanwhile, Jack calls Daniel because he suspects foul play in the death of a fellow resident, Stan. Daniel and Simon examine Stan's corpse at the anatomy school. Daniel surmises Stan removed an SS tattoo. Daniel determines Stan was killed by another resident, Judy who is an Auschwitz survivor. Judy smothered Stan because he had ordered Judy's sister's death. Daniel promises not to tell. Jack dies in his bed, nearby. Maxine accepts Bryan's marriage proposal.
10	10	"Mens Rea" ("Guilty Mind")	Daniel Nettheim	Stephen M. Irwin	11 May 2018	571,000
Daniel investigates a supposed suicide, Tim, who revives on the autopsy table and holds Daniel hostage. Tim blamed his wife's death on misdiagnosis by a haematologist, William. Tim killed William. Soroya believes Daniel's bone cutter was used to cut off Robert's ring finger. Soroya and Simon share their suspicions about Daniel. After Tim collapses, Daniel escapes. Soroya finds the hospital's copy of Robert's orthopaedic report and believes that Daniel destroyed the other. Simon finds the cutter missing from Daniel's kit. Daniel tells Simon that he killed Robert in defence of his family. Robert admitted to Fern's sexual abuse and threatened to kill Stephanie if Fern told. Daniel tells Simon to do what he must. Later Bryan arrests Daniel, who lets police onto his boat. Police are surprised to find a cutter inside Daniel's kit. Lyle tells Daniel that Jack overdosed on oxycodone. Daniel deduces Simon took a cutter from the anatomy school's set to cover his missing one. Simon explains that he was taught to look for the why. Fern finds Daniel and they cry before she leaves with Callan. Later, someone shoots Daniel whilst he is on deck.

=== Season 2 (2019) ===
No. overall	No. in season	Title	Directed by	Written by	Original release date	Aus. viewers
11	1	"Abo Imo Pectore" ("From the Deepest Chest")	Catherine Millar	Stephen M. Irwin	12 May 2019	455,000
Daniel is rescued; the bullet damaged his gall bladder. After several days in hospital, he returns to his boat. Before resuming work, Daniel meets Grace who does not date criminals or doctors. They have sex on Daniel's boat. Next morning both are surprised that Grace is the new QIFM pathologist and Lyle's niece. Grace autopsies a woman, Sherry, who was shot dead by police. Sherry had tried to kill another woman, seemingly due to psychosis. Sherry's husband, Jacob is devastated he married a psychotic killer. Daniel unofficially investigates Grace's case and concludes that Sherry, who had a hole in her heart, had formed a clot, which progressed from her heart to her brain. Bryan finds a criminal, Brendan, who confesses to shooting Daniel in revenge for being sent to prison for 11 years. A few days later Brendan dies in jail after a diabetic shock. Daniel receives a scrambled, anonymous call. The caller is happy to have missed the kill shot because he can ruin Daniel's life, piecemeal. Meanwhile, police officers burst into Fern's residence, just as she finds fentanyl citrate planted in her handbag.
12	2	"Audere Est Facere" ("To Dare Is to Do")	Catherine Millar	Leigh McGrath	19 May 2019	431,000
Fern is charged with stealing fentanyl from her employer, a chemist, Tim. Bail specifies Fern must stay with either parent but cannot associate with Callan. Jill details Fern's guilt. Daniel tells Bryan about his phone call. Two popular social media personalities and base jumpers, Luca and Tomas, fall to their deaths. One hit Ray's car, which was parked in front. Luca's chute did not deploy but Tomas' did. Luca's wife, Anna, filmed the jump for their website. Daniel and Grace's autopsy reveals Luca was infected with a tapeworm, which could affect his motor function. Callan frets over Fern, Daniel invites Callan to stay on his boat. Daniel learns that Luca was diagnosed with motor neurone disease. Anna knew but she refused to be trapped into caring for Luca for years. Anna swapped his chute, so that he was unable to reach it. Tomas jumped after Luca trying to save him. Daniel confronts Anna on the skyscraper; she feigns attempting suicide, which lures Daniel closer and she pushes him off. Grace saves Daniel as he hangs by his fingers. Daniel tells Maxine he suspects Francis Chester of threatening him, via family and friends. Maxine tells Daniel that Francis died in a prison fire.
13	3	"Malum In Se" ("Evil in Itself")	Peter Andrikidis	Michaeley O'Brien	26 May 2019	486,000
Daniel asks for a copy of Laurie's autopsy report on Francis. Daniel and Grace attend the mummified corpse of university student, Libby, found bricked up in the basement of a suburban house, over twenty years dead. Despite bail conditions, Fern and Callan still see each other. Libby had been reported missing by her friend and fellow university student, Melissa. Daniel's lawyer friend, Paul, says she is likely to be imprisoned for drug possession unless they find evidence to exonerate her. Daniel, Grace and Simon discover that another university student, James, had raped Melissa at a party at the house. It was then owned by Ron. James overdosed on ecstasy; his friend Paul saved James' life by taking him to a hospital. Upon return to the now-empty house Paul found Libby had choked on her own vomit. After failing to revive Libby, Paul bricked her into the basement. Due to exposure to asbestos while bricking her in, Paul now has asbestosis. Daniel figured out why Grace left neurosurgery, dealing with dying patients and their relatives had traumatised her. Daniel learns his old mentor Laurie Badcoe, using dental work, had identified Francis. Daniel's beloved car is set fire by Francis, who is shown to be working at the same company as Callan under a false name.
14	4	"Aegri Somnia" ("Hallucinations")	Peter Andrikidis	Stephen M. Irwin	2 June 2019	461,000
Simon and Daniel discuss Francis' modus operandi. Francis chose male-female couples, immobilising the male, then strangling the female while the male watched helplessly. Daniel tells Simon not to investigate Francis, he is dead. Maxine assigns Daniel and Grace to North Queensland as Laurie is injured. The pair autopsy a conservation officer, Ben, whose corpse was found on a beach with shark bites. Inside Ben they discover several poisonous jellyfish. Laurie confirms to Daniel that Francis is dead. Grace dates Sergeant Gabriel who encourages her to pursue Daniel if she desires. Grace is hesitant as Daniel is her boss. Water analysis reveals Ben did not die at sea but in an aquarium tank. Grace and Daniel discover a poaching ring run by the aquarium's Robert and Ben's workmate, Janelle. They killed Ben when he found their scheme. The pair also attempts to kill Harrow, but Grace saves him. Fern searches for whoever framed her; she focuses on Tim. Fern learns Tim's home address. Simon secretly investigates Francis, he finds Brendan's former cell mate, Ross. Ross confirms that Francis was Brendan's next cell mate. Simon follows a lead but is ambushed on a ferry by Francis.
15	5	"Ab Initio" ("From the Beginning")	Grant Brown	Michaeley O'Brien	9 June 2019	446,000
Simon's corpse is found beside the river. Initially it is believed he fell off the ferry. Daniel is surprised that he knew little about Simon: he had a sister, Karina; he had epilepsy since childhood and he broke up with his long-term lover three months earlier. Grace conducts Simon's autopsy under Lyle's supervision. Maxine sends Daniel to investigate the electrocution death of Ross. Daniel discovers Ross was a former prisoner and long-term gambler. Lyle tells Daniel that Simon was researching Francis. Daniel learns that Simon spoke to Ross last night, but there is not enough evidence to consider homicide. Daniel finds that Brendan shared a cell with Ross and later with Francis. Maxine confronts Daniel about her belief that Simon accidentally worked himself to death by emulating Daniel. Simon was taking modafinil to improve concentration and resist fatigue, however it may have interacted with his epilepsy medication causing dizziness. Maxine destroys several histological slides in the institute's hazardous waste incinerator. Meanwhile, Fern continues her own investigations, closely watched by Francis.
16	6	"Locus Poenitentiae" ("Place of Penitance")	Grant Brown	Leigh McGrath	16 June 2019	501,000
Daniel and Lyle are sent to Lyle's hometown, Euralla Creek in outback Queensland. Daniel meets local Sergeant Colin – Lyle’s brother. Colin investigates a vehicle collision: local baker Diane and an Adelaide man, Ethan have died. Assisting their autopsies is local surgery nurse, Edwina. Diane’s husband Bob was injured but recovered. Maxine advises Grace to seek help for her work-related stress, from her time as a neurosurgeon. Lyle discovers that Daniel had sex with Grace and declares that Daniel ruins people's lives. Daniel learns that Lyle is a local hero, who rescued three children from a house fire. Lyle downplays his actions, since a fourth child died. Fern determines that Ross and Tim knew each other from gambling. Daniel finds a fingertip of a fourth person in the accident. He travels to Bob's farm. Daniel finds Bob and Diane had kept a woman, Kyra, as a sex slave for years. Kyra became pregnant and escaped. Bob had recaptured Kyra before the collision. Bob tries to kill Daniel but Lyle overpowers him. Colin finds Kyra. Lyle and Daniel deliver her baby. Fern confronts Tim in his home, he confirms he was the source of the stolen fentanyl. Afterward, Francis immobilises Tim and burns him alive.
17	7	"Parce Sepulto" ("Forgive the Dead")	Mairi Cameron	Michaeley O'Brien	23 June 2019	466,000
Daniel and Grace autopsy the corpse of Taylor, who promoted unconventional cancer treatments. Daniel disputes the guilt of Connor, who was found over her body. His fiancée, Rebecca does not believe Connor is guilty. Rebecca was receiving Taylor's mineral treatment for her cancer. Fern tells Daniel of the links between Tim, Brendan, Ross and Simon. All are now dead. Fern is arrested for the arson-murder of Tim. Taylor's manager, Danica, fooled Taylor into believing the mineral treatment had cured Taylor's non-existent tumour. Daniel resumes investigating recent deaths. He also questions Laurie again about Francis' autopsy. Taylor is found with traces of cannabinoids over her mouth and nose. Daniel pesters deputy coroner Doug to exhume Francis' corpse. Doug requires permission from Francis' relative. Daniel asks Connor whether he smokes cannabis; he confesses to murdering Taylor. However Connor is protecting Rebecca, who killed Taylor after learning she never had cancer. Daniel speaks to Francis' mother Louise, who refuses to consider Francis is alive. Daniel tells Doug that Francis' mother died and forges Maxine's permission for the exhumation. Francis continues to attack what Daniel loves. Unbeknownst to Callan, Francis poses as his co-worker.
18	8	"Sub Silentio" ("In Silence")	Geoff Bennett	Stephen M. Irwin	30 June 2019	467,000
Daniel is suspended for forging Maxine's signature on Francis' exhumation order, so he goes to dig up the coffin himself. Francis knocks him out and he wakes up buried inside the coffin. Baggage handlers processing an Egyptian sarcophagus find the occupant has a titanium hip-joint. Inside is mining magnate, Howard, who sponsored the casket's return to Cairo. The mummy is missing. Grace's autopsy of Howard reveals signs of bondage, high dose of Viagra and a heart attack. However, these did not kill him, he suffocated in the casket. Francis taunts Daniel over a locked cell phone, sending video as he stalks Fern. Edwina joins QIFM as probationary assistant pathologist. Suspects include Howard's current wife, Isabella and his previous wife, Alice – both expect substantial payouts from Howard's estate. Daniel tries to scratch through the coffin lid with his watch. Evidence leads to the arrest of the Egyptian translator, Nenet, who tempted Howard with sex and deliberately gave him too much Viagra, in order to kill him. Nenet wanted to embarrass the Egyptian government. Howard looked dead when his lawyer wrapped him in bandages and placed him in the sarcophagus. Howard revived but subsequently died of oxygen starvation. Francis lures Fern to the boat, sending video to Daniel as he plans to kill her, but at the last moment Fern escapes. Daniel runs out of air and the coffin collapses in on him. Bryan figures out that Daniel wanted to dig up Francis and finds Daniel lying next to the once-again open grave. Fern sends Callan a picture of Francis, who chases him with a knife; Callan escapes but is hit by a scooter.
19	9	"Facilis Descensus" ("The Descent Is Easy")	Declan Eames	Leigh McGrath	7 July 2019	457,000
Daniel tells Bryan that Francis injected him and put him in the coffin. Francis also attempted to kill Fern but she escaped. Bryan is unconvinced and starts to doubt Daniel's sanity. Fern confirms that Francis tried to inject her. Bryan is hesitant to accept her identification. Fern is called to the hospital; Callan is in surgery. Bryan tells Louise that Daniel dug up Francis' coffin. QIFM conduct tests on its remains. Callan is placed in an induced coma. Lyle explains to Grace and Edwina that Francis was convicted by Daniel's discovery of propofol in the female victims. Grace and Lyle find the coffin's remains match Francis' prison dental records. Laurie tells Daniel he suspects his assistant Rhonda had smuggled a homeless man's corpse into the prison and helped Francis escape. Rhonda suddenly left and cannot be found. Grace tells Daniel he had propofol in his blood. Maxine informs Daniel that Doug is holding a tribunal to remove Daniel's licence to practice. Francis sets off a fire alarm at the hospital, then injects a comatose Callan with succinylcholine. Daniel catches Francis but chooses to save Callan's life and Francis escapes, and kidnaps Fern.
20	10	"Pater Familias" ("Father of the Family")	Declan Eames	Stephen M. Irwin	14 July 2019	462,000
Daniel saves Callan's life, but Callan is still in a coma. Daniel goes to look for Fern. Simon's and Tim's blood each had residues of succinylcholine. Doug's tribunal revokes Daniel's licence to practice. Separately, police want Daniel placed into a mental health unit. Francis threatens to kill Fern if Daniel does not meet him, alone. When they meet, Francis tells Daniel why he hunted him: Daniel's propofol evidence was faked, he'd never used it. Maxine admits to Grace that she faked the evidence. Francis takes Daniel to Louise's home. Inside Fern is tied to a chair. Francis doses Daniel with succinylcholine. Daniel had prepared himself with butyrylcholinesterase, which reduces its effects. Daniel tells Francis that Louise had poisoned his father, Maurice with monkshood. Francis wanted to kill Maurice himself so he shoots Louise dead. Francis' DNA from his original arrest does not match the DNA from the coffin's corpse, and Bryan finds video of Francis at the hospital. Fern distracts Francis by describing her own abuse by her stepfather. Daniel recovers enough to fight Francis, and Fern gets his gun; she wants to shoot him but Daniel talks her out of it. Francis is arrested but Daniel kills him by injection, making it look like a heart attack. Callan recovers and reunites with Fern. Maxine resigns from QIFM.

=== Season 3 (2021) ===
No. overall	No. in season	Title	Directed by	Written by	Original release date	Aus. viewers
21	1	"Marta [sic] Semper Certa Est" ("The Mother Is Always Certain")	Tony Tilse	Stephen M. Irwin	7 February 2021	478,000
Daniel is on leave when Bryan calls him to a shipyard where Max' corpse has documents listing Daniel as his father. Grace and Lyle perform the autopsy on Max. Later Bryan asks Daniel to help find James' mother, Tanya. Fern overhears that she has an elder half-brother and tells Daniel off. Daniel does the autopsy on Peter, a homeless man, who owned a pet rat, Maestro. Peter's daughter, Emily identifies his corpse. She describes his personality change a year earlier. Peter had Capgras delusion after brain trauma from an assault. Two different people stabbed Peter; the latter killed him. The first was from Peters close friend, Di, defending herself. Maestro has blood on him, which belongs to Peter's second attacker. Daniel finds Jordy, who has rat-bite fever. Jordy killed Peter when he waved a knife at him. Doug introduces Renae to the QIFM staff. Renae immediately appoints Lyle as Daniel's supervisor during his re-instatement period and makes Grace a fully qualified pathologist. Max' DNA result have arrived, he is not Daniel's son. When Daniel leaves, James approaches and asks him to keep those DNA results secret as long as possible.
22	2	"Damnant Quod Non Intellegunt" ("They Condemn What They Do Not Understand")	Ioan Gruffudd	Leigh McGrath	14 February 2021	490,000
Daniel and Lyle attend the corpse of an online antique dealer, Sebastian. Sebastian lived as a vampire, complete with fangs, drinking blood and sleeping in a coffin. Sebastian's heart is missing and was replaced by a cross from St Hilary's church. St Hilary's priest, Joshua was unaware it was gone. Renae reminds Daniel that he must fulfil his quota of autopsies. Daniel deduces Sebastian had erythropoietic protoporphyria, resulting in sensitivity to UV light. Ben arrives at QIFM looking for Grace. Lyle tells Daniel the next autopsy is ready. Sebastian's mother confirms his identity and disorder. Daniel tells Fern he met James. Daniel recalls Renae's history of removing health care workers. Sebastian's girlfriend, Monica, is interviewed. Joshua lied about never meeting Sebastian. Lyle and Daniel are about to start their next autopsy, when snakebite victim, Ruth revives in the morgue. Edwina takes Ruth home, near St Hilary's church. Ruth's husband Andrei thought Ruth had been killed by the local vampire, Sebastian. Andrei killed Sebastian in revenge, buried his heart at St Hilary's. Police learn that the shipyard corpse is not Daniel's son. They have CCTV of James breaking into a car in their evidence lock-up.
23	3	"Tarde Venientibus Ossa" ("For Those Who Come Late, Only the Bones")	Grant Brown	Stephen M. Irwin	21 February 2021	419,000
James meets Daniel and claims Tanya died of breast cancer. James found out about Daniel after her death. James worked as a hacker for Max. He broke into the police compound to try to recover his mobile phone. Daniel and Grace attend the corpse of Erin, who was found dead in the river. Her husband, Dave arrives at the crime scene. Erin had terminal kidney disease. The investigators initially consider suicide. The couple's children, Izzy and Nate arrive, and dispute the suicide hypothesis. Although not prescribed, toxicology shows Erin with high oxymorphone concentration. Erin's recent will leaves her estate solely to Nate. Mila arrives to identify Max' corpse. She asks Daniel why Max had Daniel's name as next of kin. Mila wants to find James but Daniel says he never met him. James meets Fern and Callan. Ben and Grace reflect on their separation and why Grace left neurosurgery. James asks Daniel to retrieve his phone. Erin's early medical history shows she had no kidney disorder and had a tubal ligation after Nate was born. Dave's mistress Bron had killed Erin, assumed her identity and bore Izzy. Dave killed the dying Bron to stop her revealing the situation.
24	4	"Per Stirpes" ("By Roots")	Grant Brown	Stephen M. Irwin	28 February 2021	487,000
Lyle organises a camping trip with Daniel and Bryan. Callan is displeased that Fern is financially supporting James. Daniel and Bryan are disgruntled with Lyle's back to nature trip. Bryan tells Daniel there is pressure from above to re-examine Max' death. James poses as a cyber-crime officer to recover his phone but it requires Bryan's authorisation. Lyle's gang encounter a ranger, Vincent, who checks their permits. Ben has applied for a job at a Brisbane hospital. A dishevelled man, Branch stumbles into Lyle's camp-site. He explains that he died by gunshot. A fake courier, looking for James, knocks on Fern's front door. The courier knows Fern is James' sister and reports to Mila that James was not evident. The three campers find bones near a Erythroxylaceae plant, which produces cocaine. Lyle returns to their car to seek help. Soon after Vincent and fellow drug-dealer Ruben arrive, they hold Daniel and Bryan at gunpoint. They discuss shooting Branch and his brother, Whitman. When Branch distracts them, Daniel and Bryan disarm and arrest Vincent and Ruben. They also bring Branch along to return with Lyle. Lyle is considering retirement.
25	5	"Ut Biberent Quoniam Esse Nollent" ("Let Them Drink, Since They Won't Eat")	Catherine Millar	Stephen M. Irwin	7 March 2021	382,000
Renae brings in former QIFM pathologist, Samuel, to investigate improper procedures. James encourages Fern to move out of Stephanie's home, but his explanations are vague. James steals mobile phones, making Fern complicit in fraud. Overnight, secondary school student, Kaara died in a motor vehicle collision. At dawn, her boyfriend, Mitchell was run over by a tractor at a beach. Mitchell had dumped Kaara at a party. Their respective fathers, Charlie and Ian, scuffle and blame the other's child for the deaths. Charlie claims Kaara was not a drinker. Both Kaara and Mitchell have high blood alcohol readings. Mobile phone footage shows Kaara apparently drunk. James admits to Fern that he knew Max but is afraid of Mila's revenge. He claims he was working for Mila to payback Tanya's medical bills. Daniel determines that Kaara had auto-brewery syndrome, which resulted in high blood alcohol. Kaara's friend, Maddison moved Mitchell's body after Kaara inadvertently ran over his slumped body behind her car. Samuel completed another autopsy of Max at Mila's behest. He finds that Max was fighting someone before he died. James' fingerprints are also found at the crime scene.
26	6	"Ne Puero Gladium" ("Don't Give a Sword to a Boy")	Catherine Millar	Leigh McGrath	14 March 2021	436,000
Citing Samuel's findings, Mila wants a murder investigation into Max' death. Bryan believes James is involved and asks to tap Daniel's phones. Callan tells the courier he does not know where Fern is. Disabled resident, Myles is found dead in his apartment block's pool. Daniel and Grace examine Myles' corpse, who shows chemical damage from pool chloride. Apartment manager, Terry confirms that Myles mixed pool chemicals. Bryan determines that Terry had stolen credit cards to access Myles' accounts. Mila confronts Daniel about Max' and James' connections. Daniel feigns not knowing James' whereabouts. Mila claims James stole $22 million from her business. Teacher, Leonard shows similar signs of chloride damage. Bryan listens when Daniel phones Fern looking for James. Mila decides to grab Fern to force Daniel to reveal James. Callan is uncomfortable that Fern trusts James too much. Daniel learns Myles was friends with Cooper, whose older brother, Alex complained that Leonard physically assaulted him. Myles and Cooper went to Leonard's home to trash it. Myles accidentally dropped a chlorine gas shell from Leonard's collection. Both Myles and Leonard inhaled the gas. Cooper ran off home. Myles stumbled back to fall into the apartment's pool.
27	7	"Sola Dosis Facit Venemum" ("The Dose Makes the Poison")	Mairi Cameron	Michaeley O'Brien	21 March 2021	401,000
James poses as an IT tech at police HQ to get access to Bryan's office. Bryan is awaiting an email with James' passport photo. Lyle performs an autopsy on Venezuelan woman, Gabriella. Daniel talks to her husband, Carl, who has heard she had a car accident after a heart attack. The autopsy reveals an allergic reaction to the raspberries lodged in Gabriella's throat. They track the raspberries to an exclusive hotel suite. The intended victim was Russian environmental activist, Yelena. Fern tries to convince Daniel to help James. Daniel's next autopsy is a Russian special forces agent garrotted by piano wire. His hand was bitten by Gabriella. Daniel deduces Gabriella was force-fed raspberries after observing they were tainted. Edwina confirms a neurotoxin in both Gabriella and the agent. Another agent tries to kill Yelena by tainting her asthma puffer but Grace and Daniel save her. Later the second agent is killed offshore for failing to kill Yelena. Mila is using her connections to put pressure on Bryan's superiors to release Max' body and the shipyard car. Callan confronts James and asks him to leave Fern alone. Tanya arrives to see Daniel.
28	8	"Alea Iacta Est" ("The Die Has Been Cast")	Mairi Cameron	Stephen M. Irwin	28 March 2021	398,000
A Faro gambling club's members, Martin and George, have a mock gun duel. Tanya still paints and exhibits. She did not want support for James or contact with Daniel. James claims not to know why Mila is after him. Police raid Daniel's meeting with Tanya to ask for James' whereabouts. Both deny knowing where he is. Lyle and Daniel autopsy Martin and George, who died at the duel. They were supposed to have used paint-ball blanks. Supervising the duel was the referee, Dugald, who ran off. According to Karen, club treasurer, the three members Martin, George and Dugald were contesting for the club's annual championship. James adjusts a corpse release form for an aged care patient to reallocate Max' effects. The Faro club's secretary, Emeline, is suspected of murdering the men. Daniel and Bryan join the Faro club to compete in the championship. Daniel wins and deduces Karen killed the men to eliminate them from the contest allowing Emeline to win the prize. Karen had convinced Emeline to hand over the prize not knowing it included a valuable stamp. Callan snoops on Mila's computer operations centre, where hackers steal customers' details.
29	9	"Quam Innocentum Damnari" ("An Innocent Man Is Punished")	Peter Andrikidis	Leigh McGrath	4 April 2021	352,000
Grace finds that Tanya is visiting Daniel. Callan explains to Fern how James worked for Mila's company, which steals customers' details. Fern counters that they have done illegal activities, she is backing James because he needs help. Daniel and Grace attend the corpse of an unemployed hairdresser, Jade. Her boyfriend is Aaron. His sister Naomi and neighbour, Pat found Jade. Autopsy determines death by manual strangulation. Jade has semen and contact DNA from Tony, who was Aaron's friend. Daniel arrives at Tony's place as Bryan raids it; they find Tony had died before Jade. A car jack had failed and Tony was crushed. James gets Fern impersonate an aged care patient's granddaughter to collect his phone. Doug pressures Renae for cost cuts at QIFM. Sage dumps Ben, who is still infatuated with Grace. Callan tells Daniel about Mila's call centre. Mila collects Max' corpse from the morgue. Daniel notices that Pat returns items to Aaron's place. Aaron had loaned his jack to Tony. Daniel works out that Naomi killed Jade and then framed Tony not knowing he was already dead. Lyle supports Daniel's full reinstatement. He accuses Renae of wanting to fire Daniel. Mila grabs James.
30	10	"Ab Initio" ("From the Beginning")	Peter Andrikidis	Stephen M. Irwin	11 April 2021	428,000
Fern tells Callan that Mila kidnapped James. Tanya takes them to Daniel. A smuggler's corpse, which arrived on a shipping container from Conakry, presents at QIFM. Renae fires Daniel and gives him a retirement package. Lyle and Grace perform the smuggler's autopsy. Renae's son Louie sneaks into the exam room. The smuggler was infected with Ebola-like virus and Louie shows symptoms. Daniel is negotiating with Mila over the release of James, when Grace phones to tell him the lab is in lockdown due to infection. QIFM security officer, Glen blocks Renae's attempts to retrieve Louie. Daniel recommends treating Louie with cyanovirin-N to slow down the virus. Daniel tracks the infected macaque to a stevedore, Andy, who has also been bitten. Grace performs an emergency skull operation on Louie to relieve his brain swelling. Daniel saves James' life and thwarts Mila's attempt to access Max' stolen money. Upon leaving Australia, Tanya confirms that James is not Daniel's son. Tanya had had an affair. James sailed off in Daniel's boat. Daniel and Fern discuss the $22 million he diverted to Fern's bank account. He suggests they buy a new boat and head to Bora Bora.

== Production ==
The series, written by Stephen M. Irwin and created and produced by Leigh McGrath, was the first international drama production for the Disney-owned ABC Studios International, which teamed up on the project with Hoodlum Entertainment, the Australian Broadcasting Corporation and Screen Queensland. The location is Brisbane, including the offices and laboratories in the heritage-listed former Brisbane Dental Hospital and College. On 2 May 2018, the ABC announced that they had commissioned a second season, with filming set to begin in September 2018. The second series began airing on 12 May 2019. On 10 October 2019, the ABC renewed the programme for a third season with filming set to begin in November 2019 and confirmed Ioan Gruffudd would direct an episode.
