= Robert Broski =

American actor

- Born: December 18, 1952 (age 73)

Robert Broski (born December 18, 1952) is an American actor best known for portraying the Woodsman in Twin Peaks: The Return and for multiple media appearances as Abraham Lincoln.

== Career ==
After years of working in construction, Broski first pursued acting in his fifties after being informed of his resemblance to Abraham Lincoln. Broski regularly portrays Lincoln at Civil War reenactment events and on television series such as The Haunted Hathaways and Aunty Donna's Big Ol' House of Fun.

In 2017, Broski appeared as the Woodsman in Part 8 of Twin Peaks: The Return.

== Filmography ==
=== Film ===
Year	Title	Role	Notes	Ref.
2010	Grace Bedell	Abraham Lincoln	Short film	
2014	Linclone	Abraham Linclone	Short film	
2016	Pee-wee's Big Holiday	Abraham Lincoln	—N/a	
2019	Once Upon a Time in Hollywood	Abraham Lincoln	Uncredited	
2020	Right Makes Might: The Lincoln-Douglas Debates	Abraham Lincoln	—N/a	
2020	BAB	Chief Brogue	—N/a	
2022	Vengeance Turns	Bad Guy Link	—N/a	
2023	The Last Stop in Yuma County	Truck Driver	—N/a	

=== Television ===
Year	Title	Role	Notes	Ref.
2013	Lincoln@Gettysburg	Abraham Lincoln	TV movie	
2014	The Haunted Hathaways	Abraham Lincoln	1 episode	
2017	Twin Peaks: The Return	The Woodsman	1 episode	
2017	U.S. Grant: American Warrior	Abraham Lincoln	TV movie	
2017	Nickelodeon's Not So Valentine's Special	Abraham Lincoln	TV special	
2018	Dumped	Ron	1 episode	
2019	Tempo	Man in Black	1 episode	
2020	L.A. Macabre	Smiley	9 episodes	
2020	Abe and Trump Being Frank	Abraham Lincoln	TV miniseries	
2020	Aunty Donna's Big Ol' House of Fun	Abraham Lincoln	1 episode	
2021	Shock Docs	Abraham Lincoln	1 episode	
2022	I Was There	Abraham Lincoln	1 episode	
2023	Jimmy Kimmel Live!	Amish	1 episode	

=== Web series ===
Year	Title	Role	Notes	Ref.
2014	Wigs	Abe	—N/a	
2023	Dhar Mann	Various	4 episodes	

=== Music videos ===
Year	Title	Artist	Role
2012	"I Have Become Almost Invisible, to Some Extent Like a Dead Man."	The Caretaker	Abraham Lincoln
2017	"You Be Love"	Avicii featuring Billy Raffoul	Angry Man 2
2024	"Shopper"	IU	Store Owner
