= Sam Doumit =

American actress

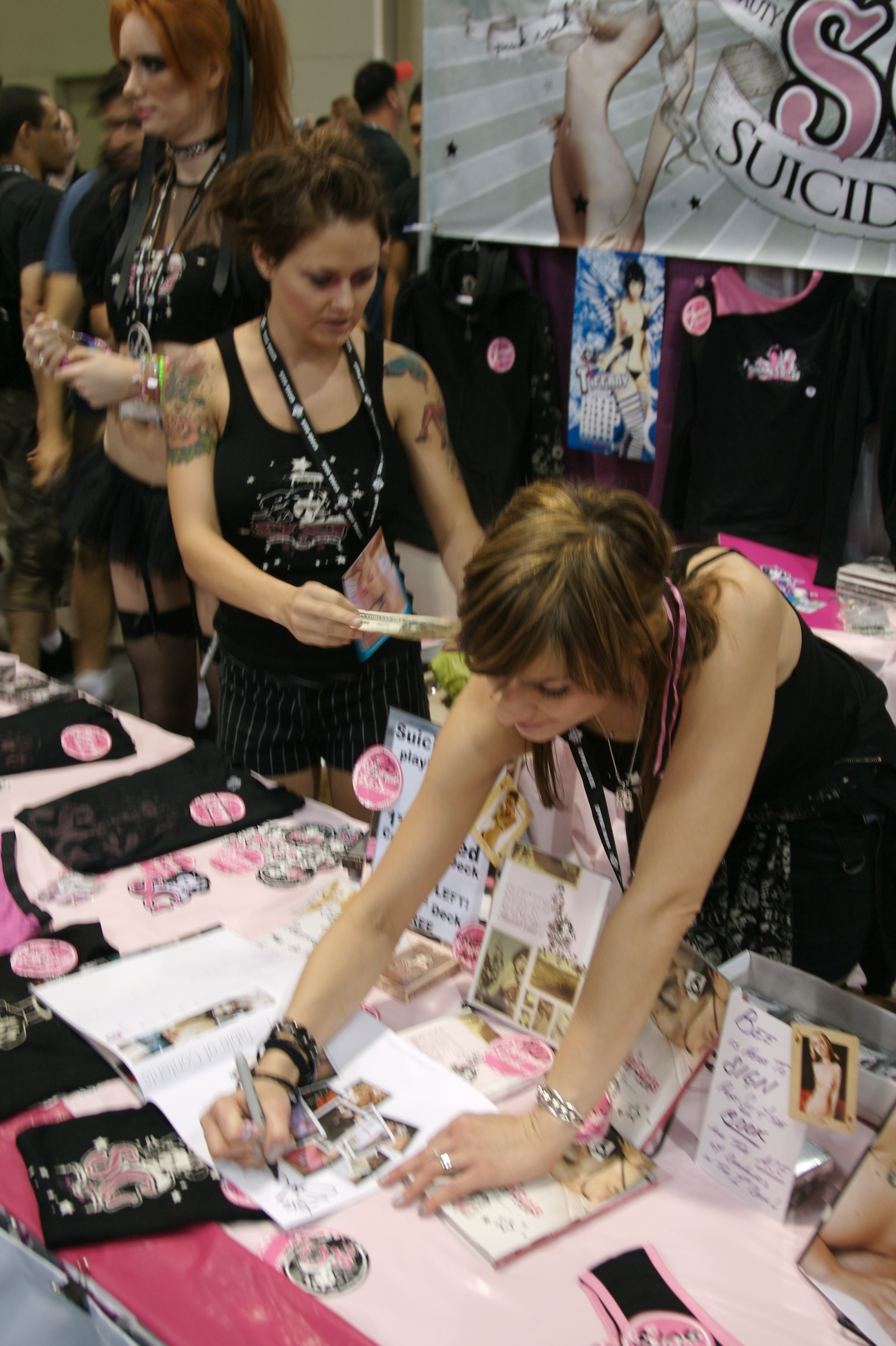
- Sam Doumit signing the Suicide Girls mag/book at San Diego Comic-Con 2007.
- Born: Samia Doumit; April 24, 1975 (age 51)
- Education: Emerson College; California Institute of the Arts; American Academy of Dramatic Arts
- Occupation: Actress
- Years active: 1998–present
- Spouse: Erik Contreras (m. 2005)
- Children: 2

Samia "Sam" Doumit (born April 24, 1975) is an American actress and producer.

== Early life ==
Doumit is of Irish, French, Lebanese, German, and Jewish descent (mother's side). She was a Dean's list and honor roll student at Emerson College in Boston, graduating in 1993, before attending the California Institute of the Arts, graduating in 1996, and then the American Academy of Dramatic Arts, which she graduated in 1997. Doumit's great-uncle is Nobel Peace Prize recipient Dr. Albert Schweitzer.

Doumit began acting on stage at age 5. She has performed in over 30 professional plays including "Bonnie" in Hurlyburly, "Laura" in The Glass Menagerie and "Juliet" in Romeo and Juliet. She played a stage actress in KY2 in 2000.

== Career ==
In 1999, Doumit was a series regular on MTV's first scripted series Undressed, playing Jana. In 2000, Doumit voiced the role of "Maggie", a recurring character on Disney's Honey, I Shrunk the Kids: The TV Show.

In 2002, Doumit played a supporting role in the film The Hot Chick with Rob Schneider, Anna Faris, and Rachel McAdams, and is featured in the Zed video clip "Starlight", included on The Hot Chick DVD. She also played a role in the 2003 independent film The Utopian Society.

Doumit guest starred on several shows, including: Castle, Shameless, Criminal Minds, The Mentalist, LAX, and Harry’s Law with Kathy Bates.

Doumit worked with her friend, actor Jeremy Sisto, in the series finale of Dawson's Creek and the film Little Savant. Doumit played a drug addled prostitute in an episode of Southland. She played the lead role “Rosie” in the 10 episode limited series Red Riding Hoods.

Doumit played "Kate" in Shakespeare's The Taming of the Shrew at the Lillian Theatre in Los Angeles. Her portrayal of "Kate" was featured in an interview and article for Estylo Magazine. From 2009 to 2010, Doumit played 8 comedic characters in the long running hit Jewtopia at The Greenway Court Theatre in Los Angeles.

== Personal life ==
Doumit married Erik Contreras on September 3, 2005.

== Filmography ==
=== Film ===
Samia Doumit's film appearances
Year	Title	Role	Ref.
1999	On the Ropes	Maya	
2001	Taylor's Wall	Taylor Manning	
2001	Beyond the Pale	Dina	
2002	The Hot Chick	Eden	
2003	The Utopian Society	Nera	
2004	Longtime Listener, 12th Time Caller	Voice (Nancy)	
2004	Just Hustle	Naomi Rose	
2008	East L.A.	Krista Guzman	
2009	Rosary Stars: Praying the Gospel	Herself	

=== Television ===
Samia Doumit's television appearances
Year	Title	Ref.
1998	Beverly Hills, 90210	
1999	Undressed	
2000	Brutally Normal	
2000	Honey, I Shrunk the Kids: The TV Show	
2001	ER	
2002	Boston Public	
2003	Dawson's Creek	
2004	CSI: Crime Scene Investigation	
2005	Passions	
2005	LAX	
2009	Southland	
2010	Castle	
2010	The Mentalist	
2010	Shameless	
2011	Matumbo Goldberg	
2011	Harry's Law	
2014	Crazy White Chicks	
2018	Criminal Minds	
2021	Red Riding Hoods	
