= Route 9 (film) =

- Genre: Crime; Drama
- Directed by: David Mackay
- Starring: Kyle MacLachlan; Peter Coyote
- Music by: Don Davis
- Country of origin: United States
- Original language: English

Production
- Executive producers: Daniel Gerst; Jeff Ivers; Ted Rosenblatt
- Producers: David Bixler; Mike Elliott; Brad Krevoy
- Production location: Los Angeles
- Cinematography: Brian Sullivan
- Editor: Bret Marnell
- Running time: 1h 45min
- Production companies: Capital Arts Entertainment; Motion Picture Corporation of America; PFG Entertainment

Original release
- Network: HBO
- Release: November 20, 1998

Route 9 is an American crime drama film released in 1998, directed by David Mackay.

== Cast ==
- Kyle MacLachlan - Deputy Booth Parker
- Peter Coyote - Sheriff Dwayne Hogan
- Amy Locane - Sally Hogan
- Wade Williams - Deputy Earl Whitney
- Miguel Sandoval - Jesse Segundo
- Roma Maffia - Agent Ellen Marks
- Joseph D. Reitman - Cliff
- Scott Coffey - Nate
- Silas Weir Mitchell - Agent Paul Danning
- Chris Murray - Cowboy

== Reviews ==
Emanuel Levy in Variety compares it to "the far more suspenseful, ambiguous and technically accomplished A Simple Plan", the 1998 film directed by Sam Raimi, and states its "gifted ensemble does its best to elevate the suspenser above B-pic level, but after the first reel, pedestrian writing and sluggish helming make it clear that this crimer is destined for the small screen and video."
