= Joseph D. Reitman =

American actor (born 1968)

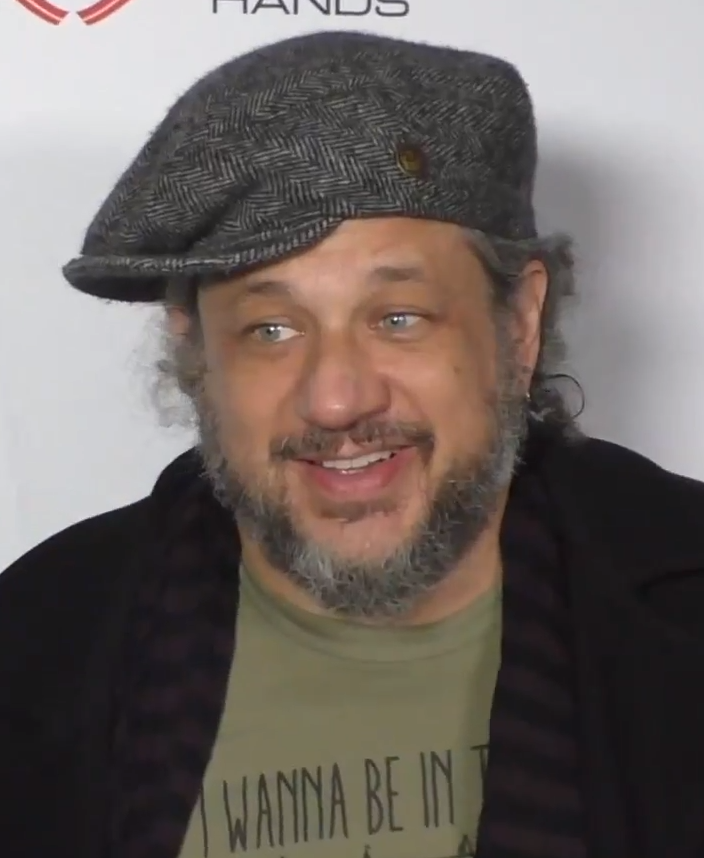
- Reitman in 2016
- Born: Joseph David Reitman; May 25, 1968 (age 57); Brookline, Massachusetts, U.S.
- Occupations: Actor, film producer, film director, writer
- Years active: 1991–present
- Spouse: Shannon Elizabeth (2002–2005)
- Partner: Annie Duke (2006–2012)

Joseph David Reitman (born May 25, 1968) is an American actor, producer, director, and writer.

== Early life ==
Joe Reitman grew up in Brookline, Massachusetts, and majored in theatre at Pitzer College in Claremont, California, in order to pursue a career in entertainment. He is Jewish and a quarter Irish.

== Career ==
Reitman was quickly cast in movie and TV roles and was brought to prominence by his recurring role as Kelly Bundy's boyfriend on Married... with Children. Notable film credits include The Perfect Storm, Lady in the Water, Clueless and Jay and Silent Bob Strike Back. Reitman wrote a story for Marvel Comics' Spider-Man Unlimited #14 titled "S.C.U.D.S", published in Spring 2006.

=== Poker ===
Reitman has played at the World Series of Poker four times and won UltimateBet.com's $1 Million Guaranteed Tournament. He has also played in numerous charity tournaments.

== Personal life ==
In 2002, Reitman married actress Shannon Elizabeth. In March 2005, the couple announced their separation. They remain friends, and he currently manages her theatrical career. Together, they founded Animal Avengers, a nonprofit organization for animal rights.

In 2006, Reitman began dating professional poker player Annie Duke. They got engaged in 2010. The couple broke up in 2012.

== Filmography ==
=== Actor ===
==== Film roles ====
Year	Title	Roles	Notes
1994	Andrew Lackhappy	Joe Antagonist	Direct-to-video
1995	Clueless	Student	
1995	Pool	Jim	Short film
1996	Beat the Bash	Brian	
1998	Clay Pigeons	Glen	
1999	Better Never Than Late	Beat-up Guy	Short film
2000	The Perfect Storm	Douglas Kosco	
2001	Tomcats	Carrot Lover	
2001	American Pie 2	Male EMT	
2001	Jay and Silent Bob Strike Back	Bluntman & Chronic Assistant Director	
2002	Auto Focus	Hippie Boy	
2002	The Real Deal	Freddy	
2002	Bum Runner	Oatmeal	Short film
2003	The Failures	Glenn	
2004	Choices	Club Boss	Short film
2005	Cursed	Mummy DJ	Uncredited
2005	Drop Dead Sexy	Tiny	
2005	Short Fuse	Sky	
2006	Bandidas	Regulator 2	
2006	Lady in the Water	Long-Haired Smoker	
2006	These Days	Andrew	
2007	Leo	Leo	Short film
2009	Crank: High Voltage	Detective	
2009	Gamer	Board Op	
2010	Radio Free Albemuth	Prisoner #1	
2011	Anti People	Marcus	Short film
2011	A Hidden Agender	Neil Caveno	Short film
2012	Tough Chuck	Chuck	Short film
2012	Orange County Hill Killers	Guy Dragging Tire	Short film
2013	Halfway to Hell	Manager	
2014	The Blackout	Buddy	
2015	A Killer of Men	Isaiah	Short film
2016	Money Monster	Matty (Floor Manager)	
2016	Queen of Hearts	Pawn Shop Owner	Short film
2017	The Suitcase	Sully Dropo	Short film
2017	This is Meg	Eric	
2017	Mom and Dad	Homeroom Teacher	
2017	The Best People	Joseph	
2019	The False Mirror	Marvin	
2019	Use Me	Luke Adore	
2019	Ghosted	Edwin	Short film
2020	Archenemy	Finn	
2020	Max Reload and the Nether Blasters	Barton Grabowski	
2021	Coronavirus Conspiracy	Economist	
2021	Witness Infection	Mario	Independent film
2023	Night Train	Tommy	

==== Television ====
Year	Title	Roles	Notes
1991	Blood Ties	Shrike Member	TV movie
1993	Street of Sunset	Tough Guy #1	Episode: "Family Affair"
1994	Beverly Hills, 90210	Freshman	Episode: "Life After Death"
1994	California Dreams	Tommy Keating	Episode: "Rebel Without a Nerve"
1994	Married... with Children	Tom	Episode: "I Want My Psycho Dad: Part 2"
1994–1995	Married... with Children	Genghis	2 episodes
1995	Married... with Children	Stoner	Episode: "Radio Free Trumaine"
1995	Hudson Street	Ernie	2 episodes
1996	Boston Common	Director	Episode: "I Thee Endow"
1996	Townies	Jesse	Main cast
1997	The Naked Truth	Billy, the homeless man	Episode: "The Scoop"
1997	Arsenio	Dan Taylor	Episode: "Throw Momma from the House"
1997	The Tony Danza Show	Fritz	Episode: "With Your Guest Host Tony DiMeo..."
1997	Head over Heels	Jason	Episode: "Reunion Guy"
1997	The Pretender	Spencer	Episode: "Over the Edge"
1997	The Drew Carey Show	Herb	Episode: "That Thing You Don't"
1997	Total Security	Dean Driscoll	Episode: "Look Who's Stalking"
1998	Significant Others	Stu	Miniseries; 2 episodes
1998	Route 9	Cliff	TV movie
1998	My Generation	Velcro	1 episode
1999-2000	Jack & Jill	Frankie	2 episodes
2000	Hollywood Off Ramp		Episode: "Casino"
2000	The Huntress	Ferdie	Episode: "Scattered"
2000	Bull	Dr. Z	Episode: "How Green Is Your Mail?"
2001	Charmed	Tarkin	2 episodes
2002	Providence	Radio Station Manager	Episode: "A New Beginning"
2002	CSI: Crime Scene Investigation	Sean Nolan	Episode: "Chasing the Bus"
2003	Rent Control	Vincent	TV movie
2003	Joan of Arcadia	Record Store Clerk	Episode: "The Devil Made Me Do It"
2005	Judging Amy	Curtis Weaver	Episode: "Revolutions Per Minute"
2005	Sleeper Cell	Bar Customer	Episode: "Immigrant"
2006	CSI: Miami	Bob Norwood	Episode: "If Looks Could Kill"
2007	Close to Home	Mike Bernard	Episode: "Eminent Domain"
2007-2008	The Shield	Axl	2 episodes
2009	CSI: Crime Scene Investigation	Jackass	Episode: "Hog Heaven"
2009	In Plain Sight	Colin Berrenson	Episode: "A Frond in Need"
2009	Mental	Ellis Kahane	Episode: "Bad Moon Rising"
2009	Monk	Evan Gildea	Episode: "Mr. Monk Takes the Stand"
2009	The Legend of Neil	Glorm	3 episodes
2010	Supernatural	Boris	Episode: "Live Free or Twihard"
2010	Squatters	Mr. Friedson	2 episodes
2012	CV Nation	Ronald	Episode: "Welcome Home, 'Guardian"
2012	Bad Girls	Stuart	Pilot
2013	The Gallery	Billy Joyce	2 episodes
2014	#Besties	Doug	Episode: "#Besties Selfie Parody"
2014	NCIS: Los Angeles	Lincoln Tate	Episode: "Humbug"
2015	The Hotel Barclay	Marty	Episode: "The Secret Knock"
2016	Just Add Magic	Jensen	Episode: "Just Add Jake"
2016	Ray Donovan	Art Fence	Episode: "Rattus Rattus"
2016-2017	37 Problems	Gunnar	Web series; Main cast
2016-2018	TMI Hollywood	Himself	4 episodes
2017-2018	Happy!	Very Bad Santa	Main cast
2019	The Punisher	Creepy Ed Zatner	Episode: "The Abyss"
2022	House Hunters	Himself	Episode: "A Matcha Made in Atlanta"
2022	First Kill	Clayton Cook	
2022–2023	National Treasure: Edge of History	The Bearded Man	5 episodes
2026	Wonder Man	Patrick Connor	Episode: "Found Footage"

==== Video game roles ====
Year	Title	Role
1995	Mr. Payback: An Interactive Movie	Dick
1997	Blue Heat: The Case of the Cover Girl Murders	Bruno Pantucci
2019	Telling Lies	Harry

=== Producer ===
- Ten Inch Hero (2007)
- Annie Duke Takes on the World (2006)

=== Director ===
- Survivin' the Island (2002)

=== Writer ===
- Survivin' the Island (2002)
