= Dangerous Animals =

2025 film by Sean Byrne

- Theatrical release poster
- Directed by: Sean Byrne
- Written by: Nick Lepard
- Produced by: Troy Lum; Andrew Mason; Pete Shilaimon; Mickey Liddell; Chris Ferguson; Brian Kavanaugh-Jones
- Starring: Hassie Harrison; Josh Heuston; Rob Carlton; Ella Newton; Liam Greinke; Jai Courtney
- Cinematography: Shelley Farthing-Dawe
- Edited by: Kasra Rassoulzadegan
- Music by: Michael Yezerski
- Production companies: LD Entertainment; Brouhaha Entertainment; Range Media Partners; Oddfellows Entertainment
- Distributed by: Independent Film Company Shudder (United States); Kismet Movies (Australia)
- Release dates: May 17, 2025 (Cannes); June 6, 2025 (United States); June 12, 2025 (Australia)
- Running time: 98 minutes
- Countries: United States; Australia
- Language: English
- Budget: $2 million
- Box office: $9.2 million

Dangerous Animals is a 2025 survival horror film directed by Sean Byrne and written by Nick Lepard. The film stars Hassie Harrison, Josh Heuston, Rob Carlton, Ella Newton, Liam Greinke, and Jai Courtney.

Dangerous Animals is a co-production between the United States and Australia. It had its premiere in the Directors' Fortnight section of the 2025 Cannes Film Festival on May 17, and was released in the United States on June 6 by Independent Film Company (its first release after rebranding from IFC Films) and Shudder, and in Australia on June 12 by Kismet Movies. The film grossed over $9 million worldwide on a budget of $2 million.

== Plot ==
Tourists Greg and Heather visit Tucker’s Experience, a shark cage attraction run by the eccentric boat captain Tucker. While riding out into the ocean, Tucker remarks on how he survived a shark attack as a child, which scarred him and changed his view of the species. After the two participate in a cage dive, Tucker suddenly kills Greg and abducts Heather.

At the Gold Coast, rebellious American drifter Zephyr has left everything else in her life behind to pursue her passion of surfing. She reluctantly helps real estate agent Moses start his car. Despite her initial abrasiveness, the two bond over their mutual love of surfing and have a one-night stand. Although Moses hopes their relationship turns into something romantic, Zephyr drives away later that night without him to surf. There, she encounters Tucker, who abducts her. Moses arrives at the surfing spot the next morning but finds no sign of Zephyr. The next day, Zephyr’s van is towed, making Moses suspicious of her whereabouts, and he begins searching for her. Zephyr awakens chained to a bed in a room where Heather is also being held. Heather reveals that Tucker is keeping them captive on his boat at sea and there is no one who can help them. Zephyr fails to pick the lock of her handcuffs.

That night, Tucker drugs Zephyr and Heather's water, and the two awaken on deck. Zephyr is strapped to a chair and watches helplessly as Heather is hoisted into the air by a harness and hovered over the water, which is filled with sharks lured by chum. Tucker sets up an old VHS camera to record as Heather is lowered into the water and devoured by sharks. Reveling in his victory, Tucker adds the tape of Heather's death to his collection, revealing that he is a serial killer who has killed dozens of women this way, targeting lone tourists who will not be noticed when they go missing. He tells Zephyr that he has been stalking her for days in hopes of having the chance to capture her. Impressed by her fiery spirit, he believes his video of her murder will be particularly exciting.

The next night, as Tucker prepares to sedate Zephyr, she attacks him with an improvised weapon and manages to escape the room. While being chased on the deck, Tucker manages to inject her but she throws his camera overboard in a scuffle before passing out. Unable to carry out his killing without a camera, a furious Tucker returns to land and docks his boat to buy a new one.

Recognizing Tucker's truck on a webcam feed of the beach at the time Zephyr vanished, Moses attempts to contact him. He sneaks onto the boat, and he hears Zephyr’s screams and discovers her. As he attempts to call the police, Tucker returns and attacks him. The two struggle with Moses nearly managing to kill Tucker before he is knocked unconscious by Tucker’s neighbor, Dave, who is unaware of the murders. When Dave hears Zephyr’s screams, Tucker kills him. Realizing that Moses and Dave's disappearances will attract the authorities, and with his boat running low on fuel, Tucker's mental state begins to unravel.

Unable to head out to sea, Tucker drives the boat out to a secluded area and puts Moses in the harness and lowers him into the water, despite Zephyr's pleas. Following Zephyr’s advice to stay still, Moses remains unharmed by the sharks. Tucker stabs Moses repeatedly in the stomach to lure more sharks, but is forced to get everyone back inside the boat when a lifeguard helicopter passes by. While Tucker waits for the coast to be clear, Zephyr, desperate to save the dying Moses, bites her thumb off to escape her handcuffs. She locks Tucker below deck while attempting to steer the boat towards land, but Tucker escapes and pursues her. She jumps into the water and attempts to swim to shore, where a wedding reception is taking place, but Tucker arms himself with his speargun and chases her down on his dinghy.

Zephyr and Moses awaken on deck, with Zephyr now in the harness. As she is lowered into the water, a large female great white shark arrives, scaring off the other sharks. Zephyr defends herself from the shark and frees herself from the harness, but falls back into the water. There, she comes face to face with the great white, but it does not attack her, and she climbs back aboard Tucker's boat. With Moses near death, Zephyr retrieves Tucker's speargun, left unattended after her previous escape attempt, and shoots the shocked Tucker. Tucker falls into the ocean and is devoured by the shark, with the moment being caught on Tucker's camera. Zephyr signals a passing boat for help, and she and Moses affirm a future together.

== Cast ==
- Jai Courtney as Tucker
- Hassie Harrison as Zephyr
- Josh Heuston as Moses
- Ella Newton as Heather
- Liam Greinke as Greg
- Rob Carlton as Dave

== Production ==
In May 2024, it was reported that Sean Byrne would direct the film from a screenplay by Nick Lepard, with Hassie Harrison, Jai Courtney and Josh Heuston set to star. Film financing and sales company Mister Smith Entertainment presented the project during the 2024 Cannes Film Market. On 30 May 2024, it was reported that production had begun on the Gold Coast, Queensland, which contributed more than $10.7 million to the state's economy.

Director Sean Byrne sought to minimize the use of computer-generated imagery for the sharks. Most of the underwater shark imagery was sourced from 4K footage of real sharks, while CGI was primarily used for fins seen above the water. The actors were filmed on open water rather than in tanks.

== Release ==
Dangerous Animals had its world premiere on May 17 at the 2025 Cannes Film Festival during the Directors' Fortnight section, becoming the first Australian feature film to screen at the program since Zak Hilditch's These Final Hours in 2014.

In February 2025, IFC Films and Shudder acquired U.S. distribution rights. The deal was completed before the former studio rebranded to Independent Film Company.

It was theatrically released in United States on June 6, 2025, followed by the Australian release on June 12, by Kismet Films.

== Reception ==
=== Box office ===
Dangerous Animals grossed $2.7 million in the United States and Canada, and $6.5 million in other territories, for a worldwide total of $9.2 million.

=== Critical response ===
On the review aggregator website Rotten Tomatoes, 87% of 180 critics' reviews are positive, with an average rating of 7.0/10. The website's consensus reads: "Stuffed to the gills with memorable shocks and a thrillingly unhinged heel turn by Jai Courtney, Dangerous Animals will be irresistible chum for horror aficionados." Metacritic, which uses a weighted average, assigned the film a score of 65 out of 100, based on 24 critics, indicating "generally favorable" reviews. Audiences polled by CinemaScore gave the film an average grade of "B" on an A+ to F scale.

Peter Debruge of Variety wrote that the film "is startlingly sleek and quite artful in its appearance." Brian Tallerico of RogerEbert.com gave the film three out of four stars and wrote, "Sean Byrne's Dangerous Animals is sharp in all the right places. It's an efficient, clever genre mash-up that works because of how well Byrne blocks its action, employs an old-fashioned score, and directs his actors to visceral performances." Paste's Jim Vorel wrote that the film was "better than 'serial killer shark movie' has any right to be".

The Guardian's Peter Bradshaw gave a less favorable review, rating the film 2 out of 5 stars. He praised Jai Courtney’s "gnarly" performance but criticized the film’s derivative nature, implausible storytelling, and "bargain-basement straight-to-streaming feel."

=== Accolades ===
Award	Date of ceremony	Category	Recipient(s)	Result	Ref.
Cannes Film Festival	24 May 2025	Directors' Fortnight	Sean Byrne	Nominated	
Fangoria Chainsaw Awards	19 October 2025	Best International Movie	Dangerous Animals	Nominated	
AACTA Awards	6 February 2026	Best Lead Actor	Jai Courtney	Nominated	
AACTA Awards	6 February 2026	Best Original Song	"Dangerous" (Ryan Bingham)	Nominated	
