= Evil Dead Wrath =

Upcoming film by Francis Galluppi

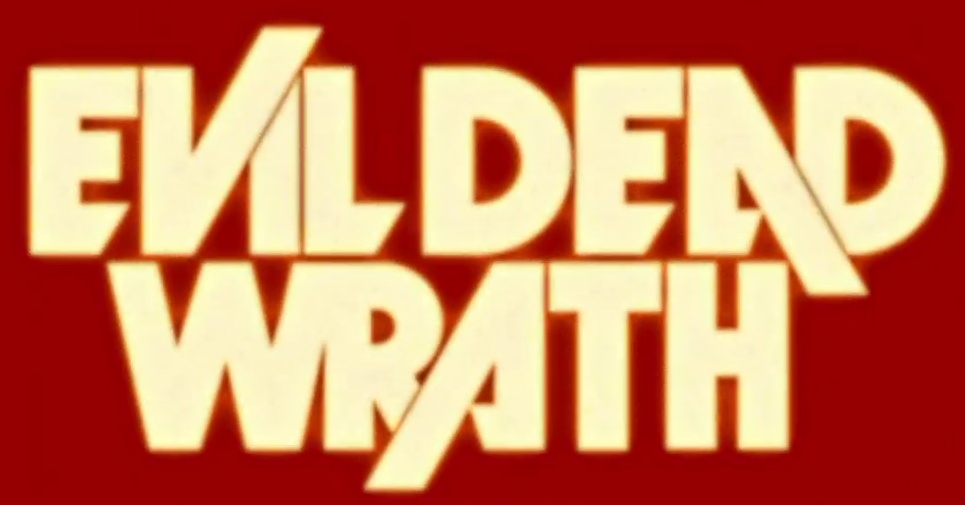
- Official logo
- Directed by: Francis Galluppi
- Written by: Francis Galluppi
- Based on: The Evil Dead by Sam Raimi
- Produced by: Rob Tapert; Sam Raimi
- Starring: Charlotte Hope; Jessica McNamee; Zach Gilford; Josh Helman; Ella Newton
- Production companies: New Line Cinema; Screen Gems; Ghost House Pictures
- Distributed by: Warner Bros. Pictures (United States); Sony Pictures Releasing International (International) (Note: Excluding the United Kingdom and France, where distribution is handled respectively by StudioCanal UK and Metropolitan Filmexport.)
- Release date: April 7, 2028
- Country: United States
- Language: English

Evil Dead Wrath is an upcoming American supernatural horror film written and directed by Francis Galluppi, and produced by Rob Tapert and series creator Sam Raimi. It is the seventh installment in the Evil Dead film series, and a prequel to The Evil Dead (1981), taking place in 1972. The film stars Charlotte Hope, Jessica McNamee, Zach Gilford, Josh Helman, and Ella Newton.

Evil Dead Wrath is scheduled to be theatrically released in the United States by Warner Bros. Pictures on April 7, 2028, with Sony Pictures Releasing International handling international distribution.

== Cast ==
- Charlotte Hope as Evelyn
- Zach Gilford as Ethan
- Jessica McNamee as Katherine
- Josh Helman as Mitch
- Ella Newton as Aubrey
- Ella Oliphant as Brooke
- Elizabeth Cullen as Sophia

== Production ==
=== Development ===
In April 2024, it was announced that a new film in the Evil Dead franchise was in development. Francis Galluppi signed on to direct and write the screenplay. Series creator and producer Sam Raimi hired Galluppi after being impressed by the latter's directorial debut The Last Stop in Yuma County (2023). Raimi and Rob Tapert serve as producers through their Ghost House Pictures banner, with Bruce Campbell, Lee Cronin, Romel Adam, and Jose Cañas serving as executive producers.

By January 2026, Charlotte Hope, Jessica McNamee, Zach Gilford, Josh Helman, Ella Newton, Ella Oliphant, and Elizabeth Cullen had joined the cast, with the film being co-financed by New Line Cinema and Sony Pictures.

=== Filming ===
A January 2026 production listing stated that filming would begin in Auckland, New Zealand, in February. On February 21, 2026, the title Evil Dead Wrath was officially announced and production was announced to be underway. Filming then wrapped on May 30.

== Release ==
Evil Dead Wrath is scheduled for a theatrical release in the United States by New Line Cinema on April 7, 2028, via Warner Bros. Pictures, while Sony Pictures Releasing International handles all international territories, excluding the United Kingdom and France, where distribution will be handled by StudioCanal UK and Metropolitan Filmexport, respectively.
