= The Iron Orchard =

2018 American drama film by Ty Roberts

- Film poster
- Directed by: Ty Roberts
- Written by: Gerry De Leon; Ty Roberts
- Produced by: Houston Hill; Ty Roberts; Camille Scioli-Mcnamara; George Sledge
- Starring: Austin Nichols; Lane Garrison; Ali Cobrin; Donny Boaz; Lew Temple
- Cinematography: Mathieu Plainfossé
- Edited by: James K. Crouch; Ty Roberts
- Music by: Duncan Thum
- Production companies: Santa Rita Film Co. Wildcatters Network
- Distributed by: Santa Rita Film Co.
- Release dates: May 5, 2018 (Dallas International Film Festival); February 22, 2019 (United States)
- Running time: 112 minutes
- Countries: United States; Italy
- Language: English

The Iron Orchard is a 2018 American historical-drama film co-written, co-produced and directed by Ty Roberts. The movie was first shown on May 5, 2018, at the Dallas International Film Festival and was limited released on February 22, 2019, in the United States. It is based on the 1966 novel by Tom Pendleton.

== Plot ==
In 1939, Jim McNeely works in the West Texas oilfields. He works and becomes a wildcatter.

== Cast ==
- Austin Nichols as Dent Paxton
- Lane Garrison as Jim McNeely
- Ali Cobrin as Lee Montgomery
- Donny Boaz as Charlie Dupree
- Lew Temple as Ort Cooley
- Hassie Harrison as Mazie Wales
- Harlan D. Whatley as Medical Doctor

== Release ==
=== Reception ===
On review aggregator Rotten Tomatoes, The Iron Orchard has an approval rating of 28% based on 18 reviews. On Metacritic, another review aggregator which uses a weighted average, assigned the film a score of 43 out of 100 based on 9 critics, indicating "mixed or average reviews"

Kimber Myers from the Los Angeles Times said that "though there are some well-framed shots from cinematographer Mathieu Plainfossé, the script from Gerry De Leon and director Ty Roberts is lifeless, covered in a layer of dust that the cast can't rouse it from." Jeannette Catsoulis writing for The New York Times stated: "Seemingly nostalgic for a period when West Texas roughnecks settled scores with baseball bats and laid pipe with pickaxes, this lovingly made homage to avarice feels strangely limp. Instead of gushing, it trickles." American film critic and historian Joe Leydon liked the movie and his review for Variety wrote: "Garrison strikes the perfect balance of cocksure swagger and not-so-quiet desperation while offering a credible and creditable portrayal of a man forever on the verge of plunging into the abyss because of the same instincts that initially fuel his ascent. He and supporting players Cobrin and Nichols help to make "The Iron Orchard" an absorbing story, even if you wind up wishing more of that story had been told." Glenn Kenny from the RogerEbert.com gave Beneath the Leaves only 1.5 out of 5 stars and stated: "As competently put together as this movie is, it imparted to me no sense of a higher calling, and thus left me unmoved." Anthony Lane from The New Yorker magazine also disliked the film, stating that "the musical score is overcooked, the cast underpowered, and the dialogue something of a mishmash..."
