= The Last Stop in Yuma County =

2023 film by Francis Galluppi

- Theatrical release poster
- Directed by: Francis Galluppi
- Written by: Francis Galluppi
- Produced by: Matt O'Neill; Atif Malik; Francis Galluppi
- Starring: Jim Cummings; Jocelin Donahue; Richard Brake; Faizon Love; Michael Abbott Jr.
- Cinematography: Mac Fisken
- Edited by: Francis Galluppi
- Music by: Matthew Compton
- Production companies: Local Boogeyman; XYZ Films; Carte Blanche; Random Lane
- Distributed by: Well Go USA Entertainment
- Release dates: September 23, 2023 (Fantastic Fest); May 10, 2024 (United States)
- Running time: 90 minutes
- Country: United States
- Language: English
- Budget: $1 million
- Box office: $685,184

The Last Stop in Yuma County is a 2023 American neo-Western crime thriller film produced, written and directed by Francis Galluppi in his feature directorial debut. It stars Jim Cummings, Jocelin Donahue, Richard Brake, Faizon Love, and Michael Abbott Jr.

The Last Stop in Yuma County premiered at Fantastic Fest on September 23, 2023, and was given a limited theatrical release in the United States before being released on digital platforms on May 10, 2024, by Well Go USA Entertainment.

== Plot ==
At a remote desert location in Yuma County, Arizona, in the 1970s, a traveling knives salesman stops at a filling station. Vernon, the station and motel attendant, informs him that the station's pumps are dry, and there are no other filling stations for over 100 miles (160 km), but that a refueling truck is expected to arrive soon. On the radio, the salesman hears about a bank robbery earlier that morning in Buckeye, where the robbers fled with approximately $700,000 in a green Ford Pinto with a damaged rear end. Charlotte, a waitress at the nearby diner, is dropped off by her husband Charlie, who is the local sheriff; she opens the diner and welcomes the salesman in. In conversation with Charlotte, he mentions that he is on his way to Carlsbad, California, for his daughter Sarah's birthday.

Shortly afterwards, the two bank robbers, Travis and Beau, pass the wreck of a refueling truck and arrive in a green Pinto, which the salesman recognizes as matching the description of the getaway car in the Buckeye robbery. He communicates his suspicions to Charlotte, who tries to phone her husband at the sheriff's office, but Beau forestalls her and cuts the phone cord before Charlotte can say a word to the sheriff. The robbers force her and the salesman at gunpoint to continue behaving normally—until the refueling truck arrives, or somebody else with enough fuel in their car stops by. Unbeknownst to everybody in the diner, the truck will never arrive because it has run off the road and lies overturned several miles away.

Charlie has his deputy, Gavin, come by the diner to pick up coffee for the police station and Charlotte tries to slip a plea for help to him on a coffee lid, but the coffee is spilled with the lid unseen when Gavin bumps into Travis. Meanwhile, joining the salesman and Charlotte in the diner are an elderly couple from Texas, a pair of young aspiring criminals named Miles and Sybil, and local rancher Pete. With the fuel tank of Pete's vehicle being almost full, Beau and Travis try to force him into giving his car keys to them, but with several people in the diner carrying a firearm, a Mexican standoff develops. Pete tries to negotiate a way out of the impasse. However, Charlotte stabs Beau with a knife, which sparks a shootout in which everybody gets killed except for the salesman and Sybil. Sybil shoots at the salesman, and he manages to stab her dead in self-defence.

The salesman decides to take the robbers' loot from the Pinto's trunk and siphons some fuel from Pete's truck. Before leaving in his own Toyota he is interrupted by a young couple with a baby who arrive on the scene. In an ensuing scuffle, the salesman ends up killing them both and, unbeknownst to him, shooting his gas tank. The salesman leaves the crying baby in the couple’s car, and drives off with a trail of spilled gas behind him. The sheriff and deputy arrive and discover the carnage. Seeking vengeance for his wife’s murder, the sheriff tracks the fleeing salesman, whose car has run out of gasoline near the wreck of the refueling truck. The sheriff doubts the salesman’s claims of innocence and shoots at the salesman as he flees. Just before he is shot in the gut, the salesman ignites a trail of gas that destroys the fuel truck, resulting in an explosion that kills the sheriff. The salesman slumps onto his bag of money as notes blow away in the wind.

== Cast ==
- Jim Cummings as The Knife Salesman
- Jocelin Donahue as Charlotte Cadell
- Sierra McCormick as Sybil
- Nicholas Logan as Travis
- Michael Abbott Jr. as Sheriff Charlie Cadell
- Connor Paolo as Deputy Gavin Kentley
- Alex Essoe as Sarah
- Robin Bartlett as Earline
- Jon Proudstar as Pete
- Sam Huntington as David
- Ryan Masson as Miles
- Barbara Crampton as Virginia
- Gene Jones as Robert
- Faizon Love as Vernon
- Richard Brake as Beau
- Robert Broski as A Truck Driver

== Production ==
The film was a passion project for Francis Galluppi who spent years trying to get it made. After a deal with a production company didn't pan out due to differing visions between Galluppi and the company, executive producer James Claeys offered to sell his own house in order to finance the film and while Galluppi was uncertain at first he eventually accepted Claeys' offer. Galluppi shot the film over the course of 20 days on a $1 million budget. Prior to working in film, Galluppi had a music career which involved a lot of travel and often described a recurring feeling of being a "fish out of water" when entering establishments in small sparsely populated areas noting the project came together when he found a diner set at the Four Aces Movie Ranch in Palmdale, California while location scouting.

== Release ==
The Last Stop in Yuma County premiered at Fantastic Fest on September 23, 2023. The film had a limited theatrical release and was released digital platforms on May 10, 2024, by Well Go USA Entertainment.

=== Home media ===
The Last Stop in Yuma County was released on Blu-ray on July 16, 2024, in the United States by Well Go USA. This release contains the film, alongside three audio commentaries, a making-of featurette and the film's theatrical trailer. Arrow Video released the film on Blu-ray February 17, 2025, in the United Kingdom. This release contains all of the bonus features from the previous release, alongside an additional interview with Galluppi, a visual essay and writing on the film.

== Reception ==
=== Box office ===
In North America (Canada, the United States, and Puerto Rico), The Last Stop in Yuma County grossed $41,520 from 45 cinemas during its opening weekend, finishing 29th in the box office rankings. In total, the film grossed $94,344 in North America.

The film did very well in France, opening to $211,801; and grossing $590,840 to this moment in France. Worldwide, the movie has made $685,184 between both territories theatrically.

=== Critical response ===
On the review aggregator website Rotten Tomatoes, 96% of 69 critics' reviews are positive, with an average rating of 7.9/10. The website's consensus reads: "A smart, tautly constructed crime thriller with some fresh twists, The Last Stop in Yuma County marks writer-director Francis Galluppi as a talent to watch." Metacritic, which uses a weighted average, assigned the film a score of 72 out of 100, based on 11 critics, indicating "generally favorable" reviews. Sam Raimi lauded the film which led to him hiring Galluppi to direct Evil Dead Wrath, the seventh film of the Evil Dead franchise.
