= The Utopian Society =

2003 American film by Jhon P. Aguirre

- Directed by: John P. Aguirre
- Written by: Jason Preston
- Produced by: John P. Aguirre; Robert Mankowitz *Executive Producer* James M. Oddo
- Starring: Sam Doumit; Austin Nichols; Malin Åkerman; Mat Hostetler; Kelvin Yu; Kirsten Ariza
- Music by: Eric Hester (2008 Warner Brothers release) - replaced original independent release score Soundtrack Produced by James M. Oddo
- Release date: April 11, 2003
- Running time: 95 minutes
- Country: United States
- Language: English

The Utopian Society is a 2003 film directed by John P. Aguirre and starring Sam Doumit, Austin Nichols, Malin Åkerman, Mat Hostetler, Kelvin Yu, and Kirsten Ariza. It was re-released by Warner Brothers in 2008.

== Plot ==
The Utopian Society is about a group of college students who are put together by their professor to complete a final project: create a utopian society. Like most college students, they’ve waited until the night before it is due to start working on it. They each come from different backgrounds and have pre-existing assumptions about the others, causing them to want to spend as little time working with each other as possible. But since they have waited until the last minute to start working, they are forced to cram an entire semester's work into one night, whether they like it or not.

== Cast ==
- Sam Doumit as Nera
- Austin Nichols as Justin Mathers
- Malin Åkerman as Tanci
- Mat Hostetler as Caleb
- Kelvin Yu as Ken
- Kristen Ariza as Aaliyah
- Robert Romanus as Barry

== Awards ==
- DV Awards (UT):WINNER - Best Long Form Drama
- RAD Digital Film Festival (Los Angeles, CA):WINNER - Best Feature Drama/Comedy
- Independents Film Festival (Tampa, FL):WINNER - Best Feature
- Texas Film Festival (College Station, Texas):WINNER - Audience Award
- Fargo Film Festival (Fargo, ND):WINNER - Audience Award
- DIY Awards (Los Angeles, CA):WINNER - Best Cinematography
- The Honolulu Film Festival (Honolulu, HI):WINNER - Best Direction
- Back East Picture Show (Hoboken, NJ):WINNER - Best Screenplay
- Wine Country Film Festival (Napa/Sonoma, CA):WINNER - Best First Feature
- Great Lakes Film Festival (Erie, Pennsylvania):WINNER - Founder's Vision Award

== Nominated ==
- Ashland Film Festival (Ashland, OR):NOMINATED - Best Acting Ensemble & Best Cinematography
- Phoenix Film Festival (Phoenix, AZ):NOMINATED - Best Acting Ensemble
