= Girl at the Window =

- Australian film poster
- Directed by: Mark Hartley
- Screenplay by: Terrence Hammond; Nicolette Minster
- Story by: Terrence Hammond
- Produced by: Antony I. Ginnane
- Starring: Radha Mitchell; Ella Newton; Vince Colosimo
- Cinematography: Garry Richards
- Edited by: Mark Hartley; Roberta Horslie
- Music by: Jamie Blanks
- Production companies: F.G. Film Productions; Film Victoria; Head Gear Films; Metrol Technology; Windows Film Holdings
- Distributed by: Kismet Movies
- Release date: 18 August 2022
- Running time: 84 minutes
- Country: Australia
- Language: English

Girl at the Window is a 2022 Australian thriller film directed by Mark Hartley and produced by Antony I. Ginnane who had previously collaborated on Patrick (2013).

== Premise ==
A teenage girl thinks the man next door might be a serial killer. Matters are complicated when he starts dating her mother.

== Cast ==
- Ella Newton as Amy Poynton
- Radha Mitchell as Barbara Poynton, Amy's mother
- Adam Rozenbachs as Amy's father
- Karis Oka as Lian Chen
- Vince Colosimo as Chris Mancini
- James Mackay as Mr. Coleman
- Lach Millar as Lachie Millar
- Lauren Goetz as Susan Miller
- Simone Buchanan as Christina Ellis
- Trae Robin as Todd Bradley
- Jackson Gallagher as Detective Reuben Knox
- Andrew S. Gilbert as Detective John Nordoff
- Sharon Johal as Detective Dhara Mallick
- Terence Hammond as Reporter
- Nathan Hill as Constable Steve Owen (uncredited)
- Kaysea Hayes
- Benjamin Carter

== Production ==
Filming took place in Melbourne during COVID lockdowns.

== Exterior links ==
- Girl at the Window at Screen Australia
- Girl at the Window at IMDb
- Girl at the Window at Letterbox DVD
