= Francis Galluppi =

American filmmaker

- Born: November 17, 1988 (age 37); Los Angeles, California
- Occupations: Film director; screenwriter; producer; editor; composer
- Years active: 2017–present

Francis Galluppi (born November 17, 1988) is an American filmmaker best known for directing the thriller film The Last Stop in Yuma County (2023).

== Early life and career ==
Francis Galluppi was born on November 17, 1988, in Los Angeles, California. He began his career by directing the short films High Desert Hell (2019) and The Gemini Project (2020). He would then direct various music videos for Mt. Joy. In 2023, he made his directorial debut with the thriller film The Last Stop in Yuma County (2023). By 2024, he would develop a "snow western" film after directing a secret "dream project". In 2026, he wrote and directed Evil Dead Wrath (2028), the seventh film of the Evil Dead franchise. In November 2026, he would write a film centered on John Constantine for DC Studios.

== Filmography ==
Short films

Year	Title	Director	Writer	Producer	Editor	Composer
2017	Palm Drive	Yes	Story	Yes	Yes	Yes
2019	High Desert Hell	Yes	Yes	Yes	Yes	Yes
2020	The Gemini Project	Yes	Yes	Yes	Yes	Yes

Feature films

Year	Title	Director	Writer	Producer	Editor	Notes / Ref(s)
2023	The Last Stop in Yuma County	Yes	Yes	Yes	Yes	
2028	Evil Dead Wrath †	Yes	Yes	No	No	Post-production

Music videos

Year	Title	Director	Writer	Producer	Editor	Band
2020	"Strangers"	Yes	Yes	Yes	Yes	Mt. Joy
2022	"Evergreen"	Yes	No	Yes	Yes	Mt. Joy
2022	"Bathroom Light"	Yes	No	Yes	Yes	Mt. Joy

== Accolades ==
For his work on The Last Stop in Yuma County, he was nominated at the North Carolina Film Critics Association for "Best Directorial Debut" and at the Columbus Film Critics Association for "Best Overlooked Film".
