= Austin Nichols =

American actor and director (born 1980)

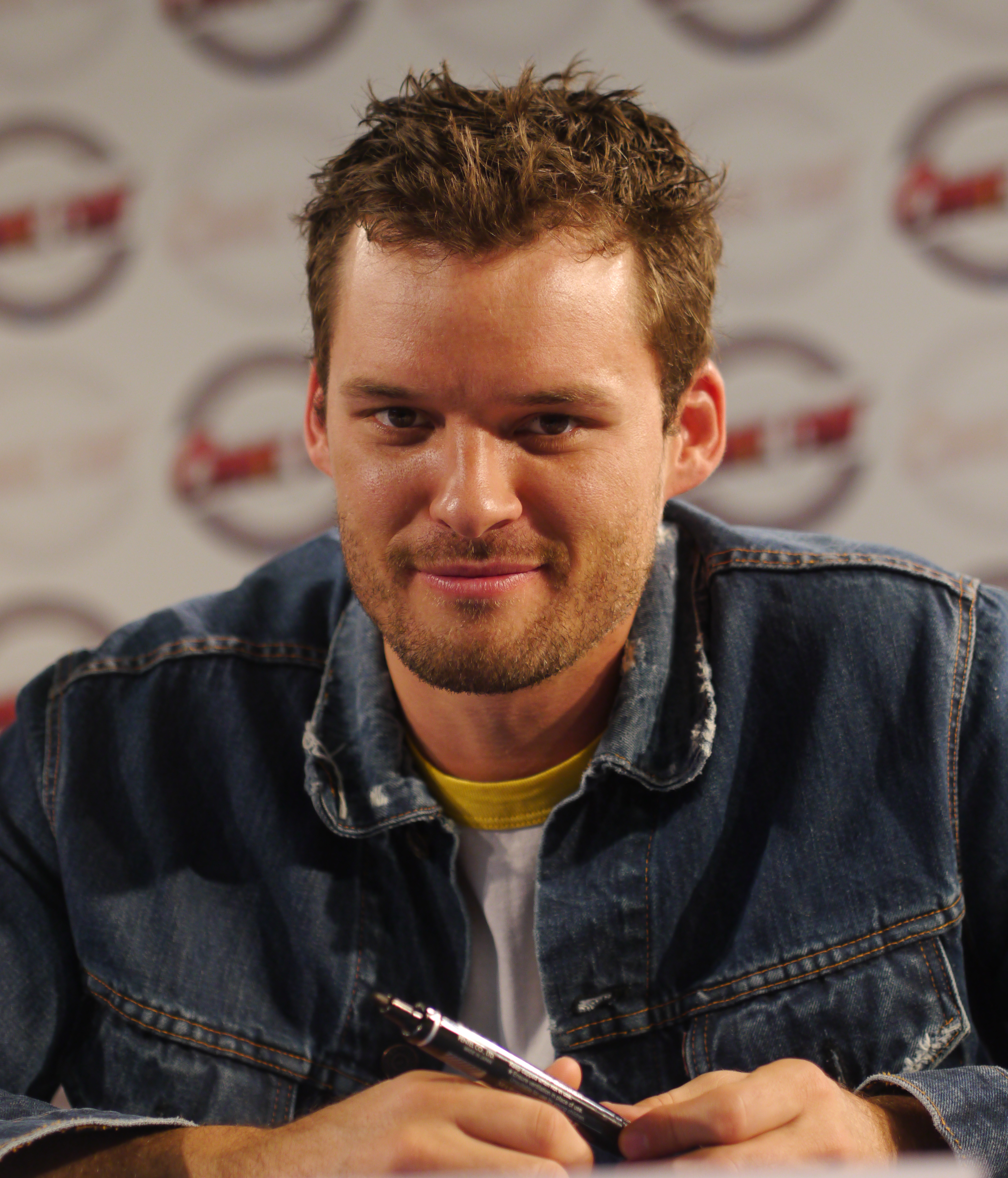
- Nichols in 2012
- Born: April 24, 1980 (age 46); Ann Arbor, Michigan, U.S.
- Education: University of Southern California
- Occupations: Actor; director
- Years active: 1999–present

Austin Nichols (born April 24, 1980) is an American actor and director, known for his role as Julian Baker in The CW drama series One Tree Hill. He is also known for his roles in the films The Day After Tomorrow and Wimbledon. He starred as John Monad in the HBO drama series John from Cincinnati, and portrayed Spencer Monroe in the AMC horror drama series The Walking Dead.

== Early life ==
Nichols was born in Ann Arbor, Michigan, and moved to Austin, Texas before his first birthday. He was named after the Austin Nichols distilling company, producers of Wild Turkey bourbon. His father, David Nichols, is a radiologist, and his mother, Kay (née Vermeulen), was a professional trick water skier. Kay was a national champion ten times and an international champion once. He has one older sister, Ashley. Nichols was raised near Lake Austin and attended Casis Elementary School. Nichols began competitive water skiing from the age of two. He represented the United States junior water ski team in the Pan-American Championships in 1997, and was also on the United States junior Olympic water skiing team. At age thirteen, he was ranked third in the world. Nichols had intended to become a professional water skier until he injured his shoulder in Florida, and was forced to give up the sport. While at McCallum High School in Austin, he played basketball but was "absolutely awful". Nichols' interest in acting was sparked when he was fifteen and began to take acting lessons. He moved to Los Angeles after high school.

== Career ==
=== Beginnings ===
His acting career began when he gate-crashed a party at the Sundance Film Festival and was signed by a manager. Nichols initially wished to attend the University of Texas, but moved to Los Angeles after his signing and enrolled at the University of Southern California, graduating in 2002 with a Bachelor of Arts degree in English. Although Nichols had guest appearances in Sliders, Odd Man Out, CSI: Crime Scene Investigation, Family Law, Watching Ellie, and Wolf Lake before his graduation, his big break came in 2002 when he appeared as Brenda Chenowith's lover in two episodes of Six Feet Under. He had previously appeared in two films, Durango Kids in 1999 and Holiday in the Sun in 2001.

In his first critically successful film role, Nichols starred as a stereotypical "frat boy" in The Utopian Society, a 2003 independent film directed by John P. Aguirre, which won several awards and some critical acclaim. One critic wrote that Nichols "transforms himself from a cardboard jock and frat boy caricature to a likeable vulnerable human being with surprising sensibilities." Aguirre commended Nichols as a "stellar talent" able to play his character "with total abandon to self ego."

=== Commercial and critical success ===
In 2004, Nichols was cast as J.D., an intelligent rich kid and romantic rival to Jake Gyllenhaal's main character in the environmental blockbuster, The Day After Tomorrow. The film received negative reviews but was a box office success. Also in 2004, he appeared in Wimbledon, opposite Kirsten Dunst and Paul Bettany. The film was well received by critics, though it was only a mild success at the U.S. box office. Nichols' acting as Jake Hammond, an arrogant tennis pro, was described as "effectively unlikeable". For the role, Nichols had to learn tennis from scratch; he was trained to look professional by Pat Cash, who was taken aback by Nichols' skill. Cash observed, "It's absolutely as good as anybody's on the circuit. I swear to God. He hits it like a bullet. He's our star pupil." By the end of their training, Nichols and Bettany were able to have rallies and play points, although some of their more intricate exchanges were computer generated.

After this success, Nichols then had a minor role in an obscure and panned 2005 film, Thanks to Gravity. Nichols followed this with short guest spots on episodes of Pasadena and Surface, before being cast in a successful 2006 film, Glory Road. Glory Road, directed by James Gartner and starring Josh Lucas, is a film based on the true story of the 1966 NCAA Men's Division I Basketball Championship, in which Coach Don Haskins led a team with an all-black starting lineup, a first in NCAA history. Nichols played one of the few white players on the team; he trained heavily for the role and had to master basketball as it was played in the 1960s, saying "I'd never been so sore in my life." The film made $42.9 million at the box office and received mixed reviews.

=== The House of Usher and beyond ===
Nichols' next film was the 2006 thriller The House of Usher, directed by Hayley Cloake, and based on the story by Edgar Allan Poe. He played the disturbed Roderick Usher, who was described by Nichols as a "twisted, terminally ill, fucked-up guy". The House of Usher was released in September 2007. Nichols also portrayed Neal Cassady, with Will Estes as Jack Kerouac, in the short film Luz del mundo.

In April 2006, Nichols guest starred in Deadwood, an HBO Western series. Shortly afterward, Nichols signed a holding deal with HBO. In August of that year, Nichols was cast as the lead in a new series, John From Cincinnati, a surfing drama created by David Milch, who also produced Deadwood. The series began airing in June 2007, but was cancelled after one season due to poor ratings and mixed critical reviews. Nichols played John Monad, a stranger who suddenly appears in a quiet surfing town. Nichols took up surfing and practiced every day for three months for this role.

In 2007, Nichols appeared in a few episodes of the NBC drama series Friday Night Lights, before being cast as Julian Baker in The CW's teen drama One Tree Hill. He was upgraded to series regular for the seventh season. He directed two episodes of the series including the seventh episode of the ninth and last season. In 2013, Austin landed the role of Tommy Wheeler in the Showtime series Ray Donovan. Nichols then had a recurring role as Spencer Monroe in AMC's horror series The Walking Dead, before being promoted to a series regular. He will recur as Sam Loomis in the fifth and final season of A&E's drama-thriller series Bates Motel.

In 2024, Nichols starred in the Lifetime film Gaslit By My Husband: The Morgan Metzer Story as Rodney Metzer.

== Personal life ==
Alongside his acting career, Nichols maintains a strong interest in cinema. He keeps a log of every film he sees. He said "I take it to the movies and write down who does the music, edits, directs, and how long the film is." Claire Oswalt, an ex-girlfriend, said in a 2003 interview that Nichols watches an average of 20 movies a week. He especially admires Hal Ashby, Sam Fuller, and John Ford.

He was previously in an on and off relationship with One Tree Hill co-star Sophia Bush from 2006 to 2012 and took the role of Julian Baker in the series to be closer to her. He also dated the actress Chloe Bennet from 2013 to 2017 after meeting on the set of Agents of S.H.I.E.L.D. where he played her ex-boyfriend, Miles.

== Filmography ==
Key
†	Denotes films that have not yet been released

=== Film ===
Year	Title	Role	Notes	Ref.
1999	Durango Kids	Sammy		
2001	Holiday in the Sun	Griffen Grayson	Direct-to-video	
2003	The Utopian Society	Justin Mathers		
2004	The Day After Tomorrow	J.D.		
2004	Wimbledon	Jake Hammond		
2005	Thanks to Gravity	Alex Ford		
2006	Glory Road	Jerry Armstrong		
2006	Lenexa, 1 Mile	Shane Bolin		
2006	The House of Usher	Roderick Usher		
2006	Love & Debate	Alex		
2007	Luz del mundo	Neal Cassady	Short film	
2008	The Informers	Martin		
2009	The True-Love Tale of Boyfriend & Girlfriend	Girlfriend	Short film	
2010	Beautiful Boy	Cooper Stearns		
2010	Unthinkable	Bomb Disposal Expert		
2012	LOL	Mr. Ross		
2013	Parkland	Emory Roberts		
2013	We Can’t Help You	Boss	Short film	
2014	Stroker	Stroker	Short film; also director	
2015	Nostradamus	Harry Fisher	Short film; also executive producer	
2016	Lawless Range	Tommy Donnelly		
2018	The Iron Orchard	Dent Paxton		
2021	Masquerade	Daniel		
2022	Match	Ian		
2024	The Six Triple Eight	Collins		
2025	I Know What You Did Last Summer	Pastor Judah		
2025	The Long Shot		director	

=== Television ===
Year	Title	Role	Notes	Ref.
1999	Sliders	Seth	Episode: "The Great Work"	
1999	Odd Man Out	Lyle	Episode: "Punch Line"	
2001	CSI: Crime Scene Investigation	Adam Walkey	Episode: "Sounds of Silence"	
2001	Family Law	James Perliss	Episode: "Sacrifices"	
2001	Pasadena	Charlie Darwell	Recurring role; 4 episodes	
2001	Watching Ellie	Joe	Episode: "Junk"	
2002	Wolf Lake	Scott Nichols	Episode: "If These Wolves Could Talk"	
2002	Six Feet Under	Kyle / Tall Stoner	Guest role; 2 episodes	
2003	She Spies	Fake College Guy	Episode: "Learning to Fly"	
2005	Quarterlife	Charlie	Television film	
2005	Surface	Jackson Holden	Recurring role; 4 episodes	
2006	CSI: Miami	Patrick Wilder	Episode: "Fade Out"	
2006	Deadwood	Morgan Earp	Guest role; 2 episodes	
2007	John from Cincinnati	John Monad	Main role; 10 episodes	
2007	Friday Night Lights	Noah Barnett	Recurring role; 2 episodes	
2008–2012	One Tree Hill	Julian Baker	Recurring role (season 6), Main role (seasons 7-9); 71 episodes	
2009	Prayers for Bobby	Ed Griffith	Television film	
2011	Five	Edward	Television film	
2013	The Mob Doctor	Luke Harris	Guest role; 3 episodes	
2013	Agents of S.H.I.E.L.D.	Miles Lydon	Episode: "Girl in the Flower Dress"	
2013–2016, 2019	Ray Donovan	Tommy Wheeler	Recurring role (seasons 1-2), Guest role (seasons 3-4, 7); 9 episodes	
2014	The Temp Agency	The Temp	Television mini-series; also executive producer	
2015–2016	The Walking Dead	Spencer Monroe	Recurring role (season 5), Main role (seasons 6-7); 15 episodes	
2017	Bates Motel	Sam Loomis	Recurring role; 6 episodes	
2019	The Village	Ethan	Guest role; 2 episodes	
2019	This Close	Shep	Recurring role; 3 episodes	
2021	Walker	Clint West	Recurring role; 8 episodes	
2022	Minx	Billy Brunson	Guest role; 3 episodes	
2024	Gaslit By My Husband: The Morgan Metzer Story	Rodney Metzer	Television film	
2026	Virgin River	Dr Eli Kelly	Guest role (season 7); 2 episodes	
